= 2025 Rwanda Challenger II – Doubles =

Doubles
- 2025 Rwanda Challenger II

Final
- Champions: (India) Siddhant Banthia (Bulgaria) Alexander Donski
- Runners-up: (France) Geoffrey Blancaneaux (Czech Republic) Zdeněk Kolář
- Score: 6–4, 5–7, [10–8]

Events
Singles	Doubles
← 2025 ·	Rwanda Challenger	· 2026 →

Jesper de Jong and Max Houkes were the defending champions but chose not to defend their title.

Siddhant Banthia and Alexander Donski won the title after defeating Geoffrey Blancaneaux and Zdeněk Kolář 6–4, 5–7, [10–8] in the final.

== Seeds ==
1. (India) Niki Kaliyanda Poonacha / (Zimbabwe) Courtney John Lock (first round)
2. (Philippines) Francis Alcantara / (Thailand) Pruchya Isaro (first round)
3. (France) Geoffrey Blancaneaux / (Czech Republic) Zdeněk Kolář (final)
4. (India) Siddhant Banthia / (Bulgaria) Alexander Donski (champions)

== Draw ==
Key

- Q = Qualifier
- WC = Wild card
- LL = Lucky loser
- Alt = Alternate
- ITF = ITF entry
- PR = Protected ranking
- SR = Special ranking
- SE = Special exempt
- JE = Junior exempt
- JR = Junior Accelerator Programme entrant
- CO = College Accelerator Programme entrant
- NG = Next Gen Accelerator Program entrant
- w/o = Walkover
- r = Retired
- d = Defaulted

=== Draw ===
First round
1	(India) N Kaliyanda Poonacha (Zimbabwe) CJ Lock	3	2
(France) C Denolly (France) C Tabur	6	6
Alt	(Slovakia) A Martin (Austria) M Neuchrist	6^{5}	7^{7}	[10]
(France) M Chazal (France) Mathys Erhard	7^{7}	6^{4}	[5]
3	(France) G Blancaneaux (Czech Republic) Z Kolář	6	6
(Romania) ND Ionel (Romania) FC Jianu	1	2
(Austria) L Neumayer (Austria) N Oberleitner	6	6
WC	(Rwanda) Claude Ishimwe (Rwanda) Etienne Niyigena	0	2
(Netherlands) T Loof (Brazil) PA Saraiva dos Santos	6	1	[16]
(United Kingdom) S Duncan (Canada) K Stevenson	0	6	[18]
(France) M Janvier (Italy) Andrea Picchione	4	6^{3}
4	(India) S Banthia (Bulgaria) A Donski	6	7^{7}
WC	(United States) A Ayeni (France) L Pavlovic	6	6
(Ivory Coast) E Coulibaly (France) C Hemery	4	2
I Gakhov (Spain) O Roca Batalla	6^{5}	6	[15]
2	(Philippines) FC Alcantara (Thailand) P Isaro	7^{7}	3	[13]

Quarterfinals
(France) C Denolly (France) C Tabur	4	5
Alt	(Slovakia) A Martin (Austria) M Neuchrist	6	7
3	(France) G Blancaneaux (Czech Republic) Z Kolář	7^{7}	6
(Austria) L Neumayer (Austria) N Oberleitner	6^{4}	1
(United Kingdom) S Duncan (Canada) K Stevenson	1	7^{8}	[6]
4	(India) S Banthia (Bulgaria) A Donski	6	6^{6}	[10]
WC	(United States) A Ayeni (France) L Pavlovic	6	3	[10]
I Gakhov (Spain) O Roca Batalla	1	6	[6]

Semifinals
Alt	(Slovakia) A Martin (Austria) M Neuchrist	6	2	[7]
3	(France) G Blancaneaux (Czech Republic) Z Kolář	4	6	[10]
4	(India) S Banthia (Bulgaria) A Donski	6	6
WC	(United States) A Ayeni (France) L Pavlovic	4	3

Final
3	(France) G Blancaneaux (Czech Republic) Z Kolář	4	7	[8]
4	(India) S Banthia (Bulgaria) A Donski	6	5	[10]
