= 2025 Rwanda Challenger II – Singles =

Singles
- 2025 Rwanda Challenger II

Final
- Champion: (France) Valentin Royer
- Runner-up: (Netherlands) Guy den Ouden
- Score: 6–2, 6–4

Events
Singles	Doubles
← 2025 ·	Rwanda Challenger	· 2026 →

Valentin Royer was the defending champion and successfully defended his title after defeating Guy den Ouden 6–2, 6–4 in the final.

== Seeds ==
1. (Netherlands) Jesper de Jong (first round, retired)
2. (France) Calvin Hemery (quarterfinals, retired)
3. (Spain) Carlos Taberner (first round)
4. (France) Valentin Royer (champion)
5. (Austria) Lukas Neumayer (second round)
6. (Australia) Bernard Tomic (first round)
7. (France) Geoffrey Blancaneaux (second round)
8. (Romania) Filip Cristian Jianu (first round)

== Draw ==
=== Key ===
- Q = Qualifier
- WC = Wild card
- LL = Lucky loser
- Alt = Alternate
- ITF = ITF entry
- PR = Protected ranking
- SR = Special ranking
- SE = Special exempt
- JE = Junior exempt
- JR = Junior Accelerator Programme entrant
- CO = College Accelerator Programme entrant
- NG = Next Gen Accelerator Program entrant
- w/o = Walkover
- r = Retired
- d = Defaulted

=== Finals ===
Semifinals
(Netherlands) Max Houkes	6^{7}	2
4	(France) Valentin Royer	7^{9}	6
Q	(France) Luka Pavlovic	3	4
Alt	(Netherlands) Guy den Ouden	6	6

Final
4	(France) Valentin Royer	6	6
Alt	(Netherlands) Guy den Ouden	2	4

=== Top half ===
First round
1	(Netherlands) J de Jong	5	2^{r}
(Spain) Àlex Martí Pujolràs	7	3
(Spain) C Sánchez Jover	3	1
(Netherlands) M Houkes	6	6
WC	(Austria) M Neuchrist	6^{6}	4
(France) C Tabur	7^{8}	6
Alt	(Italy) Andrea Picchione	3	4
7	(France) G Blancaneaux	6	6
4	(France) V Royer	6	4	6
(Spain) O Roca Batalla	2	6	3
Q	(Italy) F Agamenone	7^{8}	6^{5}	6
WC	(Slovakia) A Martin	6^{6}	7^{7}	3
(Austria) J Schwärzler	4	2
Q	(Italy) Gabriele Pennaforti	6	6
(France) M Chazal	2	4
5	(Austria) L Neumayer	6	6

Second round
(Spain) À Martí Pujolràs	7	4	3
(Netherlands) M Houkes	5	6	6
(France) C Tabur	7^{7}	6
7	(France) G Blancaneaux	6^{1}	3
4	(France) V Royer	7^{7}	7^{7}
Q	(Italy) F Agamenone	6^{3}	6^{2}
Q	(Italy) G Pennaforti	7	6
5	(Austria) L Neumayer	5	4

Quarterfinals
(Netherlands) M Houkes	6	7^{7}
(France) C Tabur	2	6^{5}
4	(France) V Royer	6	7^{7}
Q	(Italy) G Pennaforti	3	6^{5}

Semifinals
(Netherlands) M Houkes	6^{7}	2
4	(France) V Royer	7^{9}	6

=== Bottom half ===
First round
8	(Romania) FC Jianu	2	6	2
Q	(Poland) D Michalski	6	3	6
WC	(Italy) M Cecchinato	7	7^{7}
I Gakhov	5	6^{5}
(France) Mathys Erhard	6	6
(France) M Janvier	3	2
Q	(France) L Pavlovic	7^{7}	6
3	(Spain) C Taberner	6^{4}	2
6	(Australia) B Tomic	4	6^{9}
Q	(Romania) ND Ionel	6	7^{11}
Alt	(Netherlands) G den Ouden	6	6
(Austria) F Misolic	2	2
Alt	(Ivory Coast) E Coulibaly	4	1
(France) C Denolly	6	6
Q	(Turkey) Y Erel	3	6^{4}
2	(France) C Hemery	6	7^{7}

Second round
Q	(Poland) D Michalski	4	1
WC	(Italy) M Cecchinato	6	6
(France) M Erhard	4	4
Q	(France) L Pavlovic	6	6
Q	(Romania) ND Ionel	5	1
Alt	(Netherlands) G den Ouden	7	6
(France) C Denolly	3	4
2	(France) C Hemery	6	6

Quarterfinals
WC	(Italy) M Cecchinato	6^{3}	7^{7}	4
Q	(France) L Pavlovic	7^{7}	6^{4}	6
Alt	(Netherlands) G den Ouden	6^{3}	6	2
2	(France) C Hemery	7^{7}	0	0^{r}

Semifinals
Q	(France) L Pavlovic	3	4
Alt	(Netherlands) G den Ouden	6	6
