= 2026 Rwanda Challenger – Singles =

Singles
- 2026 Rwanda Challenger

Final
- Champion: (Austria) Joel Schwärzler
- Runner-up: (Italy) Stefano Napolitano
- Score: 7–6^{(7–5)}, 7–6^{(8–6)}

Events
Singles	Doubles
- Rwanda Challenger

Valentin Royer was the defending champion but chose not to defend his title.

Joel Schwärzler won the title after defeating Stefano Napolitano 7–6^{(7–5)}, 7–6^{(8–6)} in the final.

== Seeds ==
1. (Argentina) Marco Trungelliti (quarterfinals)
2. (France) Arthur Géa (semifinals)
3. (Croatia) Luka Mikrut (second round, retired)
4. (Spain) Roberto Carballés Baena (first round)
5. (Switzerland) Jérôme Kym (quarterfinals, retired)
6. (United Kingdom) Jay Clarke (first round)
7. (Czech Republic) Zdeněk Kolář (second round)
8. (France) Luka Pavlovic (quarterfinals)

== Draw ==
Key

- Q = Qualifier
- WC = Wild card
- LL = Lucky loser
- Alt = Alternate
- ITF = ITF entry
- PR = Protected ranking
- SR = Special ranking
- SE = Special exempt
- JE = Junior exempt
- JR = Junior Accelerator Programme entrant
- CO = College Accelerator Programme entrant
- NG = Next Gen Accelerator Program entrant
- w/o = Walkover
- r = Retired
- d = Defaulted

=== Finals ===
Semifinals
(Austria) Joel Schwärzler	6	7^{10}
(Italy) Marco Cecchinato	2	6^{8}
Q	(Italy) Stefano Napolitano	7^{7}	5	6
2	(France) Arthur Géa	6^{3}	7	3

Final
(Austria) Joel Schwärzler	7^{7}	7^{8}
Q	(Italy) Stefano Napolitano	6^{5}	6^{6}

=== Top half ===
First round
1	(Argentina) M Trungelliti	6	4	6
(United States) G Johns	4	6	4
(France) F Bax	6	6
WC	(Italy) Gabriele Pennaforti	3	4
(France) Mathys Erhard	6^{5}	6^{1}
(Austria) J Schwärzler	7^{7}	7^{7}
(France) Sean Cuenin	6^{2}	3
7	(Czech Republic) Z Kolář	7^{7}	6
4	(Spain) R Carballés Baena	3	2
(Austria) S Kopp	6	6
(Italy) M Cecchinato	7	6
WC	(Tunisia) A Ouakaa	5	1
Q	(Romania) ND Ionel	7	3	3
Q	(Netherlands) Michiel de Krom	5	6	6
Q	(Italy) S Pieri	7^{7}	4	4
5	(Switzerland) J Kym	6^{3}	6	6

Second round
1	(Argentina) M Trungelliti	6	6
(France) F Bax	3	4
(Austria) J Schwärzler	4	7^{7}	7^{8}
7	(Czech Republic) Z Kolář	6	6^{2}	6^{6}
(Austria) S Kopp	7^{10}	4	6^{4}
(Italy) M Cecchinato	6^{8}	6	7^{7}
Q	(Netherlands) M de Krom	4	2
5	(Switzerland) J Kym	6	6

Quarterfinals
1	(Argentina) M Trungelliti	6^{3}	7^{7}	6^{7}
(Austria) J Schwärzler	7^{7}	6^{3}	7^{9}
(Italy) M Cecchinato	6^{6}	3
5	(Switzerland) J Kym	7^{8}	3^{r}

Semifinals
(Austria) J Schwärzler	6	7^{10}
(Italy) M Cecchinato	2	6^{8}

=== Bottom half ===
First round
8	(France) L Pavlovic	6	6
(Spain) P Martín Tiffon	1	4
(Ivory Coast) E Coulibaly	6	6
WC	(France) César Bouchelaghem	3	2
Q	(Italy) S Napolitano	6	6
(France) C Denolly	3	4
(Czech Republic) J Forejtek	3	6^{5}
3	(Croatia) L Mikrut	6	7^{7}
6	(United Kingdom) J Clarke	6^{5}	6	6^{15}
(France) C Hemery	7^{7}	3	7^{17}
(Netherlands) M Houkes	3	3
Q	(Netherlands) Ryan Nijboer	6	6
(Slovakia) A Martin	2	2
(Romania) FC Jianu	6	6
Q	(Italy) E Dalla Valle	3	6^{4}
2	(France) A Géa	6	7^{7}

Second round
8	(France) L Pavlovic	6	6
(Ivory Coast) E Coulibaly	2	4
Q	(Italy) S Napolitano	1	7^{7}	3
3	(Croatia) L Mikrut	6	6^{5}	2^{r}
(France) C Hemery	6	6
Q	(Netherlands) R Nijboer	4	4
(Romania) FC Jianu	6^{2}	4
2	(France) A Géa	7^{7}	6

Quarterfinals
8	(France) L Pavlovic	4	3
Q	(Italy) S Napolitano	6	6
(France) C Hemery	3	4
2	(France) A Géa	6	6

Semifinals
Q	(Italy) S Napolitano	7^{7}	5	6
2	(France) A Géa	6^{3}	7	3
