= 2025 Rwanda Challenger – Singles =

Singles
- 2025 Rwanda Challenger

Final
- Champion: (France) Valentin Royer
- Runner-up: (Slovakia) Andrej Martin
- Score: 6–1, 6–2

Events
Singles	Doubles
← 2024 ·	Rwanda Challenger	· 2025 →

Marco Trungelliti was the defending champion but chose not to defend his title.

Valentin Royer won the title after defeating Andrej Martin 6–1, 6–2 in the final.

== Seeds ==
1. (Netherlands) Jesper de Jong (first round)
2. (Spain) Carlos Taberner (second round)
3. (France) Valentin Royer (champion)
4. (France) Calvin Hemery (first round, retired)
5. (Austria) Lukas Neumayer (quarterfinals)
6. (Romania) Filip Cristian Jianu (quarterfinals)
7. (Spain) Oriol Roca Batalla (first round)
8. (Croatia) Matej Dodig (withdrew)

== Draw ==
=== Key ===
- Q = Qualifier
- WC = Wild card
- LL = Lucky loser
- Alt = Alternate
- ITF = ITF entry
- PR = Protected ranking
- SR = Special ranking
- SE = Special exempt
- JE = Junior exempt
- JR = Junior Accelerator Programme entrant
- CO = College Accelerator Programme entrant
- NG = Next Gen Accelerator Program entrant
- w/o = Walkover
- r = Retired
- d = Defaulted

=== Finals ===
Semifinals
Q	(Slovakia) Andrej Martin	3	6	7^{7}
Alt	(Austria) Maximilian Neuchrist	6	4	6^{5}
3	(France) Valentin Royer	7	3	6
WC	(Italy) Marco Cecchinato	5	6	1

Final
Q	(Slovakia) Andrej Martin	1	2
3	(France) Valentin Royer	6	6

=== Top half ===
First round
1	(Netherlands) J de Jong	6^{1}	3
Q	(Slovakia) A Martin	7^{7}	6
(Spain) Àlex Martí Pujolràs	7^{13}	6
Q	(Czech Republic) D Kellovský	6^{11}	2
WC	(Thailand) M Jones	3	5
(France) Mathys Erhard	6	7
Q	(France) L Pavlovic	6	6
7	(Spain) O Roca Batalla	2	4
4	(France) C Hemery	4	0^{r}
Alt	(Austria) M Neuchrist	6	2
Q	(Czech Republic) Z Kolář	4	4
(Austria) J Schwärzler	6	6
(France) M Janvier	3	4
(Netherlands) M Houkes	6	6
Alt	(Ivory Coast) E Coulibaly	6	6
LL	(Poland) D Michalski	4	4

Second round
Q	(Slovakia) A Martin	6	5	6
(Spain) À Martí Pujolràs	2	7	3
(France) M Erhard	6^{3}	7^{7}	3
Q	(France) L Pavlovic	7^{7}	6^{2}	0^{r}
Alt	(Austria) M Neuchrist	4	7^{7}	6
(Austria) J Schwärzler	6	6^{5}	1
(Netherlands) M Houkes	7^{8}	6
Alt	(Ivory Coast) E Coulibaly	6^{6}	3

Quarterfinals
Q	(Slovakia) A Martin	6	6
(France) M Erhard	2	4
Alt	(Austria) M Neuchrist	6	5	7^{7}
(Netherlands) M Houkes	4	7	6^{5}

Semifinals
Q	(Slovakia) A Martin	3	6	7^{7}
Alt	(Austria) M Neuchrist	6	4	6^{5}

=== Bottom half ===
First round
6	(Romania) FC Jianu	6	6
Alt	(Romania) ND Ionel	4	4
(France) M Guinard	5	0^{r}
Q	(Austria) N Oberleitner	7	2
(France) C Tabur	6^{3}	4
Q	(Netherlands) G den Ouden	7^{7}	6
(France) M Chazal	3	4
3	(France) V Royer	6	6
5	(Austria) L Neumayer	4	6	6
WC	(Italy) Gabriele Pennaforti	6	2	4
(France) C Denolly	3	3
(Spain) C Sánchez Jover	6	6
(France) G Blancaneaux	4	4
WC	(Italy) M Cecchinato	6	6
Alt	(Italy) Andrea Picchione	2	2
2	(Spain) C Taberner	6	6

Second round
6	(Romania) FC Jianu	7^{7}	6
Q	(Austria) N Oberleitner	6^{5}	3
Q	(Netherlands) G den Ouden	6	1	6^{4}
3	(France) V Royer	4	6	7^{7}
5	(Austria) L Neumayer	6	3	7
(Spain) C Sánchez Jover	4	6	5
WC	(Italy) M Cecchinato	7^{8}	7
2	(Spain) C Taberner	6^{6}	5

Quarterfinals
6	(Romania) FC Jianu	7^{7}	6^{4}	6^{3}
3	(France) V Royer	6^{4}	7^{7}	7^{7}
5	(Austria) L Neumayer	3	7^{9}	5
WC	(Italy) M Cecchinato	6	6^{7}	7

Semifinals
3	(France) V Royer	7	3	6
WC	(Italy) M Cecchinato	5	6	1
