= 2025 Rwanda Challenger II =

- Date: 3 – 9 March
- Edition: 4th
- Surface: Clay
- Location: Kigali, Rwanda

Champions

Singles
- (France) Valentin Royer

Doubles
- (India) Siddhant Banthia / (Bulgaria) Alexander Donski
← 2025 ·	Rwanda Challenger	· 2026 →

The 2025 Rwanda Challenger II was a professional tennis tournament played on clay courts. It was the fourth edition of the tournament which was part of the 2025 ATP Challenger Tour. It took place in Kigali, Rwanda, between 3 and 9 March 2025.

== Singles main-draw entrants ==
=== Seeds ===
Country	Player	Rank^{1}	Seed
NED	Jesper de Jong	105	1
FRA	Calvin Hemery	171	2
ESP	Carlos Taberner	173	3
FRA	Valentin Royer	182	4
AUT	Lukas Neumayer	210	5
AUS	Bernard Tomic	219	6
FRA	Geoffrey Blancaneaux	221	7
ROU	Filip Cristian Jianu	228	8

- ^{1} Rankings are as of 24 February 2025.

=== Other entrants ===
The following players received wildcards into the singles main draw:

- (Italy) Marco Cecchinato
- (Slovakia) Andrej Martin
- (Austria) Maximilian Neuchrist

The following players received entry into the singles main draw as alternates:

- (Ivory Coast) Eliakim Coulibaly
- (Netherlands) Guy den Ouden
- (Italy) Andrea Picchione

The following players received entry from the qualifying draw:

- (Italy) Franco Agamenone
- (Turkey) Yankı Erel
- (Romania) Nicholas David Ionel
- (Poland) Daniel Michalski
- (France) Luka Pavlovic
- (Italy) Gabriele Pennaforti

== Champions ==
=== Singles ===
- (France) Valentin Royer def. (Netherlands) Guy den Ouden 6–2, 6–4.

=== Doubles ===
- (India) Siddhant Banthia / (Bulgaria) Alexander Donski def. (France) Geoffrey Blancaneaux / (Czech Republic) Zdeněk Kolář 6–4, 5–7, [10–8].
