= 2025 Rwanda Challenger – Doubles =

Doubles
- 2025 Rwanda Challenger

Final
- Champions: (Netherlands) Jesper de Jong (Netherlands) Max Houkes
- Runners-up: (France) Geoffrey Blancaneaux (Czech Republic) Zdeněk Kolář
- Score: 6–3, 7–5

Events
Singles	Doubles
← 2024 ·	Rwanda Challenger	· 2025 →

Thomas Fancutt and Hunter Reese were the defending champions but chose not to defend their title.

Jesper de Jong and Max Houkes won the title after defeating Geoffrey Blancaneaux and Zdeněk Kolář 6–3, 7–5 in the final.

== Seeds ==
1. (Philippines) Francis Alcantara / (Thailand) Pruchya Isaro (first round)
2. (France) Geoffrey Blancaneaux / (Czech Republic) Zdeněk Kolář (final)
3. (United Kingdom) Scott Duncan / (Canada) Kelsey Stevenson (first round)
4. (Netherlands) Thijmen Loof / (Brazil) Paulo André Saraiva dos Santos (semifinals)

== Draw ==
Key

- Q = Qualifier
- WC = Wild card
- LL = Lucky loser
- Alt = Alternate
- ITF = ITF entry
- PR = Protected ranking
- SR = Special ranking
- SE = Special exempt
- JE = Junior exempt
- JR = Junior Accelerator Programme entrant
- CO = College Accelerator Programme entrant
- NG = Next Gen Accelerator Program entrant
- w/o = Walkover
- r = Retired
- d = Defaulted

=== Draw ===
First round
1	(Philippines) FC Alcantara (Thailand) P Isaro	4	4
(Italy) F Agamenone (Italy) Andrea Picchione	6	6
WC	(France) M Chazal (France) Julien De Cuyper	3	6^{2}
PR	(Austria) M Neuchrist (Austria) J Schwärzler	6	7^{7}
3	(United Kingdom) S Duncan (Canada) K Stevenson	6^{4}	6	[8]
(Romania) ND Ionel (Romania) FC Jianu	7^{7}	4	[10]
(Netherlands) G den Ouden (Poland) D Michalski	2	4
(Netherlands) J de Jong (Netherlands) M Houkes	6	6
Alt	(Italy) Facundo Juárez (Spain) O Roca Batalla	6	6^{7}	[7]
(France) L Pavlovic (France) V Royer	4	7^{9}	[10]
Alt	(United States) A Ayeni (Turkey) Y Erel	4	7^{8}	[7]
4	(Netherlands) T Loof (Brazil) PA Saraiva dos Santos	6	6^{6}	[10]
(France) C Denolly (France) C Tabur	6	6
WC	(Spain) Axel Herberg Amorós (Spain) Àlex Martí Pujolràs	3	2
(Spain) C Sánchez Jover (Spain) C Taberner	6	3	[4]
2	(France) G Blancaneaux (Czech Republic) Z Kolář	4	6	[10]

Quarterfinals
(Italy) F Agamenone (Italy) A Picchione	3	6^{4}
PR	(Austria) M Neuchrist (Austria) J Schwärzler	6	7^{7}
(Romania) ND Ionel (Romania) FC Jianu	3	5
(Netherlands) J de Jong (Netherlands) M Houkes	6	7
(France) L Pavlovic (France) V Royer
4	(Netherlands) T Loof (Brazil) PA Saraiva dos Santos	w/o
(France) C Denolly (France) C Tabur	3	6	[2]
2	(France) G Blancaneaux (Czech Republic) Z Kolář	6	3	[10]

Semifinals
PR	(Austria) M Neuchrist (Austria) J Schwärzler	6^{5}	6^{7}
(Netherlands) J de Jong (Netherlands) M Houkes	7^{7}	7^{9}
4	(Netherlands) T Loof (Brazil) PA Saraiva dos Santos	2	4
2	(France) G Blancaneaux (Czech Republic) Z Kolář	6	6

Final
(Netherlands) J de Jong (Netherlands) M Houkes	6	7
2	(France) G Blancaneaux (Czech Republic) Z Kolář	3	5
