= 2026 Rwanda Challenger – Doubles =

Doubles
- 2026 Rwanda Challenger

Final
- Champions: (United Kingdom) Jay Clarke (Netherlands) Max Houkes
- Runners-up: (India) Siddhant Banthia (Bulgaria) Alexander Donski
- Score: 6–4, 6–7^{(6–8)}, [12–10]

Events
Singles	Doubles
- Rwanda Challenger

Siddhant Banthia and Alexander Donski were the defending champions but lost in the final to Jay Clarke and Max Houkes.

Clarke and Houkes won the title after defeating Banthia and Donski 6–4, 6–7^{(6–8)}, [12–10] in the final.

== Seeds ==
1. (India) Siddhant Banthia / (Bulgaria) Alexander Donski (final)
2. (Romania) Victor Vlad Cornea / (Spain) Bruno Pujol Navarro (first round)
3. (Czech Republic) Filip Duda / (Czech Republic) Zdeněk Kolář (quarterfinals)
4. (Finland) Eero Vasa / (Japan) Seita Watanabe (first round)

== Draw ==
Key

- Q = Qualifier
- WC = Wild card
- LL = Lucky loser
- Alt = Alternate
- ITF = ITF entry
- PR = Protected ranking
- SR = Special ranking
- SE = Special exempt
- JE = Junior exempt
- JR = Junior Accelerator Programme entrant
- CO = College Accelerator Programme entrant
- NG = Next Gen Accelerator Program entrant
- w/o = Walkover
- r = Retired
- d = Defaulted

First round
1	(India) S Banthia (Bulgaria) A Donski	6	6
(Spain) P Martín Tiffon (Spain) O Roca Batalla	4	4
(France) C Denolly (Croatia) L Mikrut	6	5	[10]
(Spain) R Carballés Baena (Argentina) M Trungelliti	2	7	[4]
3	(Czech Republic) F Duda (Czech Republic) Z Kolář	6	6
WC	(France) C Hemery (Tunisia) S Mansouri	3	4
(France) F Bax (Tunisia) A Ouakaa	6^{6}	3
(Serbia) S Latinović (France) L Pavlovic	7^{8}	6
WC	(Burundi) GO Iradukunda (Zimbabwe) CJ Lock	7^{7}	6^{4}	[14]
(Romania) FC Jianu (Austria) S Kopp	6^{2}	7^{7}	[16]
(India) SDP Dev (India) Nitin Kumar Sinha	6	6
4	(Finland) E Vasa (Japan) S Watanabe	4	4
(United Kingdom) J Clarke (Netherlands) M Houkes	6	6
(Ivory Coast) E Coulibaly (France) Mathys Erhard	1	4
Alt	(United States) G Johns (Spain) Iván Marrero Curbelo	6	7^{7}
2	(Romania) V Cornea (Spain) B Pujol Navarro	3	6^{3}

Quarterfinals
1	(India) S Banthia (Bulgaria) A Donski	w/o
(France) C Denolly (Croatia) L Mikrut
3	(Czech Republic) F Duda (Czech Republic) Z Kolář	4	3
(Serbia) S Latinović (France) L Pavlovic	6	6
(Romania) FC Jianu (Austria) S Kopp	6	4	[4]
(India) SDP Dev (India) NK Sinha	4	6	[10]
(United Kingdom) J Clarke (Netherlands) M Houkes	6^{6}	6	[10]
Alt	(United States) G Johns (Spain) I Marrero Curbelo	7^{8}	4	[8]

Semifinals
1	(India) S Banthia (Bulgaria) A Donski	7^{7}	6
(Serbia) S Latinović (France) L Pavlovic	6^{5}	4
(India) SDP Dev (India) NK Sinha	4	3
(United Kingdom) J Clarke (Netherlands) M Houkes	6	6

Final
1	(India) S Banthia (Bulgaria) A Donski	4	7^{8}	[10]
(United Kingdom) J Clarke (Netherlands) M Houkes	6	6^{6}	[12]
