= 2025 Rwanda Challenger =

- Date: 24 February – 1 March
- Edition: 3rd
- Surface: Clay
- Location: Kigali, Rwanda

Champions

Singles
- (France) Valentin Royer

Doubles
- (Netherlands) Jesper de Jong / (Netherlands) Max Houkes
← 2024 ·	Rwanda Challenger	· 2025 →

The 2025 Rwanda Challenger was a professional tennis tournament played on clay courts. It was the third edition of the tournament which was part of the 2025 ATP Challenger Tour. It took place in Kigali, Rwanda, between 24 February and 1 March 2025.

== Singles main-draw entrants ==
=== Seeds ===
Country	Player	Rank^{1}	Seed
NED	Jesper de Jong	105	1
ESP	Carlos Taberner	177	2
FRA	Valentin Royer	188	3
FRA	Calvin Hemery	190	4
AUT	Lukas Neumayer	212	5
ROU	Filip Cristian Jianu	226	6
ESP	Oriol Roca Batalla	252	7
~~CRO~~	~~Matej Dodig~~	~~264~~	~~8~~

- ^{1} Rankings are as of 17 February 2025.

=== Other entrants ===
The following players received wildcards into the singles main draw:

- (Italy) Marco Cecchinato
- (Thailand) Maximus Jones
- (Italy) Gabriele Pennaforti

The following players received entry into the singles main draw as alternates:

- (Ivory Coast) Eliakim Coulibaly
- (Romania) Nicholas David Ionel
- (Austria) Maximilian Neuchrist
- (Italy) Andrea Picchione

The following players received entry from the qualifying draw:

- (Netherlands) Guy den Ouden
- (Czech Republic) Dominik Kellovský
- (Czech Republic) Zdeněk Kolář
- (Slovakia) Andrej Martin
- (Austria) Neil Oberleitner
- (France) Luka Pavlovic

The following player received entry as a lucky loser:

- (Poland) Daniel Michalski

== Champions ==
=== Singles ===
- (France) Valentin Royer def. (Slovakia) Andrej Martin 6–1, 6–2.

=== Doubles ===
- (Netherlands) Jesper de Jong / (Netherlands) Max Houkes def. (France) Geoffrey Blancaneaux / (Czech Republic) Zdeněk Kolář 6–3, 7–5.
