= 2024 Rwanda Challenger II – Singles =

Singles
- 2024 Rwanda Challenger II

Final
- Champion: (Argentina) Marco Trungelliti
- Runner-up: (France) Clément Tabur
- Score: 6–4, 6–2

Events
Singles	Doubles
← 2024 ·	Rwanda Challenger	· 2025 →

Kamil Majchrzak was the defending champion but lost in the semifinals to Marco Trungelliti in a rematch of the previous week's Rwanda Challenger final.

Trungelliti won the title after defeating Clément Tabur 6–4, 6–2 in the final.

== Seeds ==
1. Ivan Gakhov (first round)
2. (Tunisia) Aziz Dougaz (withdrew)
3. (France) Calvin Hemery (quarterfinals)
4. (Argentina) Marco Trungelliti (champion)
5. (France) Clément Tabur (final)
6. (Romania) Nicholas David Ionel (first round)
7. (Zimbabwe) Benjamin Lock (second round)
8. (Netherlands) Max Houkes (first round)

== Draw ==
Key

- Q = Qualifier
- WC = Wild card
- LL = Lucky loser
- Alt = Alternate
- ITF = ITF entry
- PR = Protected ranking
- SR = Special ranking
- SE = Special exempt
- JE = Junior exempt
- JR = Junior Accelerator Programme entrant
- CO = College Accelerator Programme entrant
- NG = Next Gen Accelerator Program entrant
- w/o = Walkover
- r = Retired
- d = Defaulted

=== Finals ===
Semifinals
Q	(Poland) Kamil Majchrzak	3	4
4	(Argentina) Marco Trungelliti	6	6
5	(France) Clément Tabur	6	6
(Switzerland) Damien Wenger	1	3

Final
4	(Argentina) Marco Trungelliti	6	6
5	(France) Clément Tabur	4	2

=== Top half ===
First round
1	I Gakhov	3	7	5
Q	(Poland) K Majchrzak	6	5	7
Q	(Egypt) Akram El Sallaly	2	3
(Austria) D Pichler	6	6
Q	(United States) S Kozlov	6	6
Q	(United States) N Schachter	3	4
(Italy) Gabriele Pennaforti	3	6^{5}
7	(Zimbabwe) B Lock	6	7^{7}
4	(Argentina) M Trungelliti	7	6
(United States) Jacob Brumm	5	2
Q	(Australia) T Fancutt	6	7
(India) SDP Dev	2	5
(Israel) Y Oliel	2	2
(Argentina) JP Paz	6	6
(Egypt) M Safwat	6	6
8	(Netherlands) M Houkes	2	4

Second round
Q	(Poland) K Majchrzak	6	6
(Austria) D Pichler	3	2
Q	(United States) S Kozlov	7^{7}	5	6
7	(Zimbabwe) B Lock	6^{2}	7	4
4	(Argentina) M Trungelliti	6	6
Q	(Australia) T Fancutt	3	3
(Argentina) JP Paz	6^{4}	2
(Egypt) M Safwat	7^{7}	6

Quarterfinals
Q	(Poland) K Majchrzak	6	6
Q	(United States) S Kozlov	3	0
4	(Argentina) M Trungelliti	1	6	6
(Egypt) M Safwat	6	2	1

Semifinals
Q	(Poland) K Majchrzak	3	4
4	(Argentina) M Trungelliti	6	6

=== Bottom half ===
First round
5	(France) C Tabur	6	6
(France) Émilien Voisin	1	4
Q	(France) F Bax	4	4
(Argentina) H Casanova	6	6
(France) C Denolly	6	6
(United States) J Sheehy	1	4
B Bobrov	3	4
3	(France) C Hemery	6	6
6	(Romania) ND Ionel	5	1
(Switzerland) D Wenger	7	6
WC	(Burundi) GO Iradukunda	6	1	6^{3}
Alt	(Tunisia) A Ouakaa	4	6	7^{7}
(Israel) D Cukierman	6	6
WC	(Rwanda) Ernest Habiyambere	2	0
(United States) A Ayeni	6	6
LL	(United States) Jaycer Lyeons	4	3

Second round
5	(France) C Tabur	6	6
(Argentina) H Casanova	4	3
(France) C Denolly	3	0^{r}
3	(France) C Hemery	6	0
(Switzerland) D Wenger	3	6	3
Alt	(Tunisia) A Ouakaa	6	4	0^{r}
(Israel) D Cukierman	4	6	7
(United States) A Ayeni	6	0	5

Quarterfinals
5	(France) C Tabur	4	7^{7}	6
3	(France) C Hemery	6	6^{4}	4
(Switzerland) D Wenger	1	6	7^{7}
(Israel) D Cukierman	6	3	6^{2}

Semifinals
5	(France) C Tabur	6	6
(Switzerland) D Wenger	1	3
