= 2026 Rwanda Challenger II – Doubles =

Doubles
- 2026 Rwanda Challenger II

Final
- Champions: (Serbia) Stefan Latinović (France) Luka Pavlovic
- Runners-up: (India) Siddhant Banthia (Bulgaria) Alexander Donski
- Score: 7–6^{(7–5)}, 7–6^{(7–2)}

Events
Singles	Doubles
- Rwanda Challenger

Jay Clarke and Max Houkes were the defending champions but retired from their semifinal match against Stefan Latinović and Luka Pavlovic.

Latinović and Pavlovic won the title after defeating Siddhant Banthia and Alexander Donski 7–6^{(7–5)}, 7–6^{(7–2)} in the final.

== Seeds ==
1. (India) Siddhant Banthia / (Bulgaria) Alexander Donski (final)
2. (Romania) Alexandru Jecan / (Japan) Seita Watanabe (first round)
3. (Romania) Victor Vlad Cornea / (Spain) Bruno Pujol Navarro (first round)
4. (Czech Republic) Filip Duda / (Czech Republic) Zdeněk Kolář (quarterfinals)

== Draw ==
Key

- Q = Qualifier
- WC = Wild card
- LL = Lucky loser
- Alt = Alternate
- ITF = ITF entry
- PR = Protected ranking
- SR = Special ranking
- SE = Special exempt
- JE = Junior exempt
- JR = Junior Accelerator Programme entrant
- CO = College Accelerator Programme entrant
- NG = Next Gen Accelerator Program entrant
- w/o = Walkover
- r = Retired
- d = Defaulted

First round
1	(India) S Banthia (Bulgaria) A Donski	7^{7}	2	[10]
(Slovakia) A Martin (Austria) M Neuchrist	6^{2}	6	[8]
Alt	(South Africa) Alec Beckley (Ivory Coast) E Coulibaly	2	7^{7}	[7]
(France) F Bax (Tunisia) A Ouakaa	6	6^{5}	[10]
3	(Romania) V Cornea (Spain) B Pujol Navarro	7^{7}	4	[10]
(India) SDP Dev (India) Nitin Kumar Sinha	6^{1}	6	[12]
WC	(Burundi) GO Iradukunda (Zimbabwe) CJ Lock	3	3
(France) C Denolly (Finland) E Vasa	6	6
(United States) G Johns (Spain) Iván Marrero Curbelo	1	7^{7}	[6]
(United Kingdom) J Clarke (Netherlands) M Houkes	6	6^{5}	[10]
WC	(France) C Hemery (Tunisia) S Mansouri	3	6^{9}
4	(Czech Republic) F Duda (Czech Republic) Z Kolář	6	7^{11}
(Romania) FC Jianu (Austria) S Kopp	6	7^{7}
Alt	(Netherlands) Michiel de Krom (Netherlands) Ryan Nijboer	3	6^{2}
(Serbia) S Latinović (France) L Pavlovic	7	6
2	(Romania) A Jecan (Japan) S Watanabe	5	3

Quarterfinals
1	(India) S Banthia (Bulgaria) A Donski	6	7^{7}
(France) F Bax (Tunisia) A Ouakaa	4	6^{4}
(India) SDP Dev (India) NK Sinha	6	6
(France) C Denolly (Finland) E Vasa	3	3
(United Kingdom) J Clarke (Netherlands) M Houkes	6	7^{9}
4	(Czech Republic) F Duda (Czech Republic) Z Kolář	4	6^{7}
(Romania) FC Jianu (Austria) S Kopp	6^{6}	2
(Serbia) S Latinović (France) L Pavlovic	7^{8}	6

Semifinals
1	(India) S Banthia (Bulgaria) A Donski	6	6
(India) SDP Dev (India) NK Sinha	3	4
(United Kingdom) J Clarke (Netherlands) M Houkes	0^{r}
(Serbia) S Latinović (France) L Pavlovic	1

Final
1	(India) S Banthia (Bulgaria) A Donski	6^{5}	6^{2}
(Serbia) S Latinović (France) L Pavlovic	7^{7}	7^{7}
