= 2024 Rwanda Challenger – Singles =

Singles
- 2024 Rwanda Challenger

Final
- Champion: (Poland) Kamil Majchrzak
- Runner-up: (Argentina) Marco Trungelliti
- Score: 6–4, 6–4

Events
| Singles | Doubles |
| Rwanda Challenger | · 2024 → |

This was the first edition of the tournament.

Kamil Majchrzak won the title after defeating Marco Trungelliti 6–4, 6–4 in the final.

== Seeds ==
1. Ivan Gakhov (first round)
2. (France) Clément Tabur (first round)
3. (France) Calvin Hemery (quarterfinals)
4. (Argentina) Marco Trungelliti (final)
5. (Romania) Nicholas David Ionel (quarterfinals)
6. (Zimbabwe) Benjamin Lock (first round)
7. (Netherlands) Max Houkes (semifinals)
8. (Egypt) Mohamed Safwat (first round)

== Draw ==
Key

- Q = Qualifier
- WC = Wild card
- LL = Lucky loser
- Alt = Alternate
- ITF = ITF entry
- PR = Protected ranking
- SR = Special ranking
- SE = Special exempt
- JE = Junior exempt
- JR = Junior Accelerator Programme entrant
- CO = College Accelerator Programme entrant
- NG = Next Gen Accelerator Program entrant
- w/o = Walkover
- r = Retired
- d = Defaulted

=== Finals ===
Semifinals
7 | (Netherlands) Max Houkes | 6 | 4 | 3
WC | (Poland) Kamil Majchrzak | 4 | 6 | 6
4 | (Argentina) Marco Trungelliti | 3 | 6 | 6
(United States) Stefan Kozlov | 6 | 4 | 3

Final
WC | (Poland) Kamil Majchrzak | 6 | 6
4 | (Argentina) Marco Trungelliti | 4 | 4

=== Top half ===
First round
1 | I Gakhov | 7 | 3 | 6^{3}
(Italy) Gabriele Pennaforti | 5 | 6 | 7^{7}
(France) C Denolly | 7^{7} | 7
(Argentina) H Casanova | 6^{2} | 5
Q | (United States) Preston Brown | 6 | 6
(India) SDP Dev | 3 | 2
Q | (United States) A Ayeni | 1 | 7 | 2
7 | (Netherlands) M Houkes | 6 | 5 | 6
3 | (France) C Hemery | 6 | 6
(Austria) D Pichler | 2 | 3
Q | (Italy) Luca Fantini | 0 | 6^{0}
(Switzerland) D Wenger | 6 | 7^{7}
B Bobrov | 3 | 2
WC | (Poland) K Majchrzak | 6 | 6
(Argentina) JP Paz | 7^{11} | 6
8 | (Egypt) M Safwat | 6^{9} | 1

Second round
(Italy) G Pennaforti | 6 | 6^{2} | 2
(France) C Denolly | 1 | 7^{7} | 6
Q | (United States) P Brown | 4 | 4
7 | (Netherlands) M Houkes | 6 | 6
3 | (France) C Hemery | 7 | 6
(Switzerland) D Wenger | 5 | 4
WC | (Poland) K Majchrzak | 6 | 6
(Argentina) JP Paz | 3 | 0

Quarterfinals
(France) C Denolly | 2 | 3
7 | (Netherlands) M Houkes | 6 | 6
3 | (France) C Hemery | 5 | 3
WC | (Poland) K Majchrzak | 7 | 6

Semifinals
7 | (Netherlands) M Houkes | 6 | 4 | 3
WC | (Poland) K Majchrzak | 4 | 6 | 6

=== Bottom half ===
First round
5 | (Romania) ND Ionel | 6 | 6
(United States) J Sheehy | 1 | 2
(United States) Jacob Brumm | 6 | 4 | 6^{3}
WC | (Burundi) GO Iradukunda | 3 | 6 | 7^{7}
(Tunisia) A Ouakaa | 2 | 1
(France) Émilien Voisin | 6 | 6
Q | (United States) N Schachter | 4 | 4
4 | (Argentina) M Trungelliti | 6 | 6
6 | (Zimbabwe) B Lock | 6 | 6^{2} | 3
Q | (France) Lucas Bouquet | 4 | 7^{7} | 6
Q | Ivan Denisov | 4 | 2
(Israel) Y Oliel | 6 | 6
WC | (Rwanda) Ernest Habiyambere | 1 | 6^{7}
(Israel) D Cukierman | 6 | 7^{9}
(United States) S Kozlov | 6 | 7^{7}
2 | (France) C Tabur | 4 | 6^{4}

Second round
5 | (Romania) ND Ionel | 6 | 6
WC | (Burundi) GO Iradukunda | 2 | 2
(France) É Voisin | 1 | 5
4 | (Argentina) M Trungelliti | 6 | 7
Q | (France) L Bouquet | 4 | 6 | 3
(Israel) Y Oliel | 6 | 3 | 6
(Israel) D Cukierman | 5 | 7^{7} | 6^{5}
(United States) S Kozlov | 7 | 6^{4} | 7^{7}

Quarterfinals
5 | (Romania) ND Ionel | 3 | 2
4 | (Argentina) M Trungelliti | 6 | 6
(Israel) Y Oliel | 6 | 3 | 1
(United States) S Kozlov | 4 | 6 | 6

Semifinals
4 | (Argentina) M Trungelliti | 3 | 6 | 6
(United States) S Kozlov | 6 | 4 | 3
