= 2026 Rwanda Challenger II – Singles =

Singles
- 2026 Rwanda Challenger II

Final
- Champion: (Argentina) Marco Trungelliti
- Runner-up: (Italy) Marco Cecchinato
- Score: 4–6, 6–0, 6–3

Events
| Singles | Doubles |
- Rwanda Challenger

Joel Schwärzler was the defending champion but lost in the first round to Stefano Napolitano.

Marco Trungelliti won the title after defeating Marco Cecchinato 4–6, 6–0, 6–3 in the final.

== Seeds ==
1. (Argentina) Marco Trungelliti (champion)
2. (France) Arthur Géa (semifinals)
3. (Spain) Roberto Carballés Baena (first round)
4. (United Kingdom) Jay Clarke (second round)
5. (Czech Republic) Zdeněk Kolář (semifinals)
6. (France) Luka Pavlovic (first round)
7. (Austria) Joel Schwärzler (first round)
8. (Italy) Marco Cecchinato (final)

== Draw ==
Key

- Q = Qualifier
- WC = Wild card
- LL = Lucky loser
- Alt = Alternate
- ITF = ITF entry
- PR = Protected ranking
- SR = Special ranking
- SE = Special exempt
- JE = Junior exempt
- JR = Junior Accelerator Programme entrant
- CO = College Accelerator Programme entrant
- NG = Next Gen Accelerator Program entrant
- w/o = Walkover
- r = Retired
- d = Defaulted

=== Finals ===
Semifinals
1 | (Argentina) Marco Trungelliti | 6 | 6
5 | (Czech Republic) Zdeněk Kolář | 3 | 3
8 | (Italy) Marco Cecchinato | 6 | 6
2 | (France) Arthur Géa | 3 | 4

Final
1 | (Argentina) Marco Trungelliti | 4 | 6 | 6
8 | (Italy) Marco Cecchinato | 6 | 0 | 3

=== Top half ===
First round
1 | (Argentina) M Trungelliti | 6 | 6
(Spain) P Martín Tiffon | 4 | 2
(Czech Republic) J Forejtek | 6 | 6
WC | (Tunisia) A Ouakaa | 1 | 2
Q | (Bulgaria) A Donski | 7^{7} | 7^{11}
(United States) G Johns | 6^{4} | 6^{9}
(Netherlands) M Houkes | 4 | 6 | 6
6 | (France) L Pavlovic | 6 | 2 | 2
3 | (Spain) R Carballés Baena | 4 | 6 | 6^{3}
Q | (Finland) E Vasa | 6 | 3 | 7^{7}
Q | (Netherlands) Ryan Nijboer | 6^{5} | 5
(Romania) FC Jianu | 7^{7} | 7
(Ivory Coast) E Coulibaly | 4 | 3
(France) C Denolly | 6 | 6
(Spain) O Roca Batalla | 4 | 5
5 | (Czech Republic) Z Kolář | 6 | 7

Second round
1 | (Argentina) M Trungelliti | 7^{7} | 4 | 7^{7}
(Czech Republic) J Forejtek | 6^{0} | 6 | 6^{5}
Q | (Bulgaria) A Donski | 6^{8} | 6^{1}
(Netherlands) M Houkes | 7^{10} | 7^{7}
Q | (Finland) E Vasa | 3 | 6^{5}
(Romania) FC Jianu | 6 | 7^{7}
(France) C Denolly | 1 | 2
5 | (Czech Republic) Z Kolář | 6 | 6

Quarterfinals
1 | (Argentina) M Trungelliti | 6^{6} | 7^{7} | 6
(Netherlands) M Houkes | 7^{8} | 6^{5} | 3
(Romania) FC Jianu | 6^{8} | 6^{1}
5 | (Czech Republic) Z Kolář | 7^{10} | 7^{7}

Semifinals
1 | (Argentina) M Trungelliti | 6 | 6
5 | (Czech Republic) Z Kolář | 3 | 3

=== Bottom half ===
First round
8 | (Italy) M Cecchinato | 6 | 6
Q | (Burundi) GO Iradukunda | 0 | 2
(Austria) S Kopp | 6 | 6
LL | (Spain) Iván Marrero Curbelo | 4 | 1
(France) Mathys Erhard | 7^{7} | 1 | 3
(Slovakia) A Martin | 6^{5} | 6 | 6
Q | (Germany) Maik Steiner | 7^{7} | 3 | 3
4 | (United Kingdom) J Clarke | 6^{5} | 6 | 6
7 | (Austria) J Schwärzler | 6^{13} | 6^{4}
(Italy) S Napolitano | 7^{15} | 7^{7}
(France) F Bax | 6^{5} | 7^{7} | 6^{6}
WC | (Austria) M Neuchrist | 7^{7} | 6^{4} | 7^{8}
Q | (Italy) Gabriele Pennaforti | 2 | 6^{3}
(France) Sean Cuenin | 6 | 7^{7}
WC | (France) César Bouchelaghem | 6 | 6^{3} | 4
2 | (France) A Géa | 2 | 7^{7} | 6

Second round
8 | (Italy) M Cecchinato | 4 | 6 | 6
(Austria) S Kopp | 6 | 3 | 4
(Slovakia) A Martin | 7^{7} | 6
4 | (United Kingdom) J Clarke | 6^{3} | 3
(Italy) S Napolitano | 6 | 6^{6} | 6
WC | (Austria) M Neuchrist | 3 | 7^{8} | 1
(France) S Cuenin | 1 | 0^{r}
2 | (France) A Géa | 6 | 0

Quarterfinals
8 | (Italy) M Cecchinato | 7^{9} | 6
(Slovakia) A Martin | 6^{7} | 3
(Italy) S Napolitano | 3 | 4
2 | (France) A Géa | 6 | 6

Semifinals
8 | (Italy) M Cecchinato | 6 | 6
2 | (France) A Géa | 3 | 4
