= 2026 Rwanda Challenger II =

- Date: 9 – 15 March
- Edition: 6th
- Surface: Clay
- Location: Kigali, Rwanda

Champions

Singles
- (Argentina) Marco Trungelliti

Doubles
- (Serbia) Stefan Latinović / (France) Luka Pavlovic
- Rwanda Challenger

The 2026 Rwanda Challenger II was a professional tennis tournament played on clay courts. It was the sixth edition of the tournament which was part of the 2026 ATP Challenger Tour. It took place in Kigali, Rwanda, between 9 and 15 March 2026.

== Singles main-draw entrants ==
=== Seeds ===
Country	Player	Rank^{1}	Seed
ARG	Marco Trungelliti	132	1
FRA	Arthur Géa	161	2
ESP	Roberto Carballés Baena	168	3
GBR	Jay Clarke	184	4
CZE	Zdeněk Kolář	197	5
FRA	Luka Pavlovic	211	6
AUT	Joel Schwärzler	214	7
ITA	Marco Cecchinato	225	8

- ^{1} Rankings are as of 2 March 2026.

=== Other entrants ===
The following players received wildcards into the singles main draw:

- (France) César Bouchelaghem
- (Austria) Maximilian Neuchrist
- (Tunisia) Aziz Ouakaa

The following players received entry from the qualifying draw:

- (Bulgaria) Alexander Donski
- (Burundi) Guy Orly Iradukunda
- (Netherlands) Ryan Nijboer
- (Italy) Gabriele Pennaforti
- (Germany) Maik Steiner
- (Finland) Eero Vasa

The following player received entry as a lucky loser:

- (Spain) Iván Marrero Curbelo

== Champions ==
=== Singles ===
- (Argentina) Marco Trungelliti def. (Italy) Marco Cecchinato 4–6, 6–0, 6–3.

=== Doubles ===
- (Serbia) Stefan Latinović / (France) Luka Pavlovic def. (India) Siddhant Banthia / (Bulgaria) Alexander Donski 7–6^{(7–5)}, 7–6^{(7–2)}.
