= 2024 Rwanda Challenger =

- Date: 26 February – 2 March
- Edition: 1st
- Surface: Clay
- Location: Kigali, Rwanda

Champions

Singles
- (Poland) Kamil Majchrzak

Doubles
- (Netherlands) Max Houkes / (France) Clément Tabur
Rwanda Challenger	· 2024 →

The 2024 Rwanda Challenger was a professional tennis tournament played on clay courts. It was the first edition of the tournament which was part of the 2024 ATP Challenger Tour. It took place in Kigali, Rwanda, between 26 February and 2 March 2024.

== Singles main-draw entrants ==
=== Seeds ===
Country	Player	Rank^{1}	Seed
	Ivan Gakhov	176	1
FRA	Clément Tabur	216	2
FRA	Calvin Hemery	219	3
ARG	Marco Trungelliti	220	4
ROU	Nicholas David Ionel	263	5
ZIM	Benjamin Lock	350	6
NED	Max Houkes	353	7
EGY	Mohamed Safwat	364	8

- ^{1} Rankings are as of 19 February 2024.

=== Other entrants ===
The following players received wildcards into the singles main draw:

- (Rwanda) Ernest Habiyambere
- (Burundi) Guy Orly Iradukunda
- (Poland) Kamil Majchrzak

The following players received entry from the qualifying draw:

- (United States) Alafia Ayeni
- (France) Lucas Bouquet
- (United States) Preston Brown
- Ivan Denisov
- (Italy) Luca Fantini
- (United States) Noah Schachter

== Champions ==
=== Singles ===
- (Poland) Kamil Majchrzak def. (Argentina) Marco Trungelliti 6–4, 6–4.

=== Doubles ===
- (Netherlands) Max Houkes / (France) Clément Tabur def. (Thailand) Pruchya Isaro / (Indonesia) Christopher Rungkat 6–3, 7–6^{(7–4)}.
