= 2024 Rwanda Challenger II =

- Date: 4 – 10 March
- Edition: 2nd
- Surface: Clay
- Location: Kigali, Rwanda

Champions

Singles
- (Argentina) Marco Trungelliti

Doubles
- (Australia) Thomas Fancutt / (United States) Hunter Reese
← 2024 ·	Rwanda Challenger	· 2025 →

The 2024 Rwanda Challenger II was a professional tennis tournament played on clay courts. It was the second edition of the tournament which was part of the 2024 ATP Challenger Tour. It took place in Kigali, Rwanda, between 4 and 10 March 2024.

== Singles main-draw entrants ==
=== Seeds ===
Country	Player	Rank^{1}	Seed
	Ivan Gakhov	176	1
~~TUN~~	~~Aziz Dougaz~~	~~218~~	~~2~~
FRA	Calvin Hemery	219	3
ARG	Marco Trungelliti	220	4
FRA	Clément Tabur	222	5
ROU	Nicholas David Ionel	258	6
ZIM	Benjamin Lock	355	7
NED	Max Houkes	357	8

- ^{1} Rankings are as of 26 February 2024.

=== Other entrants ===
The following players received wildcards into the singles main draw:

- ~~(Tunisia) Aziz Dougaz~~
- (Rwanda) Ernest Habiyambere
- (Burundi) Guy Orly Iradukunda

The following player received entry into the singles main draw as an alternate:

- (Tunisia) Aziz Ouakaa

The following players received entry from the qualifying draw:

- (France) Florent Bax
- (Egypt) Akram El Sallaly
- (Australia) Thomas Fancutt
- (United States) Stefan Kozlov
- (Poland) Kamil Majchrzak
- (United States) Noah Schachter

The following player received entry as a lucky loser:

- (United States) Jaycer Lyeons

== Champions ==
=== Singles ===
- (Argentina) Marco Trungelliti def. (France) Clément Tabur 6–4, 6–2.

=== Doubles ===
- (Australia) Thomas Fancutt / (United States) Hunter Reese def. (India) S D Prajwal Dev / (Austria) David Pichler 6–1, 7–5.
