= 2026 Rwanda Challenger =

- Date: 2 – 7 March
- Edition: 5th
- Surface: Clay
- Location: Kigali, Rwanda

Champions

Singles
- (Austria) Joel Schwärzler

Doubles
- (United Kingdom) Jay Clarke / (Netherlands) Max Houkes
- Rwanda Challenger

The 2026 Rwanda Challenger was a professional tennis tournament played on clay courts. It was the fifth edition of the tournament which was part of the 2026 ATP Challenger Tour. It took place in Kigali, Rwanda, between 2 and 7 March 2026.

== Singles main-draw entrants ==
=== Seeds ===
Country	Player	Rank^{1}	Seed
ARG	Marco Trungelliti	134	1
FRA	Arthur Géa	161	2
CRO	Luka Mikrut	162	3
ESP	Roberto Carballés Baena	164	4
SUI	Jérôme Kym	179	5
GBR	Jay Clarke	184	6
CZE	Zdeněk Kolář	199	7
FRA	Luka Pavlovic	209	8

- ^{1} Rankings are as of 23 February 2026.

=== Other entrants ===
The following players received wildcards into the singles main draw:

- (France) César Bouchelaghem
- (Tunisia) Aziz Ouakaa
- (Italy) Gabriele Pennaforti

The following players received entry from the qualifying draw:

- (Italy) Enrico Dalla Valle
- (Netherlands) Michiel de Krom
- (Romania) Nicholas David Ionel
- (Italy) Stefano Napolitano
- (Netherlands) Ryan Nijboer
- (Italy) Samuele Pieri

== Champions ==
=== Singles ===
- (Austria) Joel Schwärzler def. (Italy) Stefano Napolitano 7–6^{(7–5)}, 7–6^{(8–6)}.

=== Doubles ===
- (United Kingdom) Jay Clarke / (Netherlands) Max Houkes def. (India) Siddhant Banthia / (Bulgaria) Alexander Donski 6–4, 6–7^{(6–8)}, [12–10].
