= 2024 Rwanda Challenger II – Doubles =

Doubles
- 2024 Rwanda Challenger II

Final
- Champions: (Australia) Thomas Fancutt (United States) Hunter Reese
- Runners-up: (India) S D Prajwal Dev (Austria) David Pichler
- Score: 6–1, 7–5

Events
Singles	Doubles
← 2024 ·	Rwanda Challenger	· 2025 →

Max Houkes and Clément Tabur were the defending champions but chose not to defend their title.

Thomas Fancutt and Hunter Reese won the title after defeating S D Prajwal Dev and David Pichler 6–1, 7–5 in the final.

== Seeds ==
1. (Tunisia) Aziz Ouakaa / (Canada) Kelsey Stevenson (quarterfinals, withdrew)
2. (Australia) Thomas Fancutt / (United States) Hunter Reese (champions)
3. (France) Corentin Denolly / (Switzerland) Damien Wenger (quarterfinals)
4. Bogdan Bobrov / (India) Parikshit Somani (first round)

== Draw ==
Key

- Q = Qualifier
- WC = Wild card
- LL = Lucky loser
- Alt = Alternate
- ITF = ITF entry
- PR = Protected ranking
- SR = Special ranking
- SE = Special exempt
- JE = Junior exempt
- JR = Junior Accelerator Programme entrant
- CO = College Accelerator Programme entrant
- NG = Next Gen Accelerator Program entrant
- w/o = Walkover
- r = Retired
- d = Defaulted

First round
1	(Tunisia) A Ouakaa (Canada) K Stevenson	6	7^{7}
Alt	Ivan Denisov (Bulgaria) Leonid Sheyngezikht	3	6^{3}
(Ghana) Abraham Asaba (France) F Bax	4	1
(Israel) D Cukierman (Israel) Y Oliel	6	6
4	B Bobrov (India) Parikshit Somani	1	2
(India) SDP Dev (Austria) D Pichler	6	6
(Egypt) Akram El Sallaly (Egypt) M Safwat	6^{5}	5
WC	(Zimbabwe) B Lock (Zimbabwe) CJ Lock	7^{7}	7
(Thailand) P Isaro (Indonesia) C Rungkat	6^{2}	6^{4}
(Japan) S Watanabe (Japan) T Yuzuki	7^{7}	7^{7}
(India) Sai Karteek Reddy Ganta (Burundi) GO Iradukunda	4	2
3	(France) C Denolly (Switzerland) D Wenger	6	6
(United States) N Schachter (United States) J Sheehy	w/o
(United States) A Ayeni (United States) S Kozlov
(Argentina) H Casanova (Argentina) JP Paz	4	6^{7}
2	(Australia) T Fancutt (United States) H Reese	6	7^{9}

Quarterfinals
1	(Tunisia) A Ouakaa (Canada) K Stevenson
(Israel) D Cukierman (Israel) Y Oliel	w/o
(India) SDP Dev (Austria) D Pichler	6	7^{14}
WC	(Zimbabwe) B Lock (Zimbabwe) CJ Lock	4	6^{12}
(Japan) S Watanabe (Japan) T Yuzuki	6	3	[10]
3	(France) C Denolly (Switzerland) D Wenger	4	6	[5]
(United States) N Schachter (United States) J Sheehy	6	3	[8]
2	(Australia) T Fancutt (United States) H Reese	3	6	[10]

Semifinals
(Israel) D Cukierman (Israel) Y Oliel	4	3
(India) SDP Dev (Austria) D Pichler	6	6
(Japan) S Watanabe (Japan) T Yuzuki	3	4
2	(Australia) T Fancutt (United States) H Reese	6	6

Final
(India) SDP Dev (Austria) D Pichler	1	5
2	(Australia) T Fancutt (United States) H Reese	6	7
