= 2024 Rwanda Challenger – Doubles =

Doubles
- 2024 Rwanda Challenger

Final
- Champions: (Netherlands) Max Houkes (France) Clément Tabur
- Runners-up: (Thailand) Pruchya Isaro (Indonesia) Christopher Rungkat
- Score: 6–3, 7–6^{(7–4)}

Events
Singles	Doubles
Rwanda Challenger	· 2024 →

This was the first edition of the tournament.

Max Houkes and Clément Tabur won the title after defeating Pruchya Isaro and Christopher Rungkat 6–3, 7–6^{(7–4)} in the final.

== Seeds ==
1. (Tunisia) Aziz Ouakaa / (Canada) Kelsey Stevenson (first round)
2. (Australia) Thomas Fancutt / (United States) Hunter Reese (semifinals)
3. (France) Corentin Denolly / (Switzerland) Damien Wenger (quarterfinals)
4. (India) S D Prajwal Dev / (Austria) David Pichler (first round)

== Draw ==
Key

- Q = Qualifier
- WC = Wild card
- LL = Lucky loser
- Alt = Alternate
- ITF = ITF entry
- PR = Protected ranking
- SR = Special ranking
- SE = Special exempt
- JE = Junior exempt
- JR = Junior Accelerator Programme entrant
- CO = College Accelerator Programme entrant
- NG = Next Gen Accelerator Program entrant
- w/o = Walkover
- r = Retired
- d = Defaulted

First round
1	(Tunisia) A Ouakaa (Canada) K Stevenson	4	4
(Thailand) P Isaro (Indonesia) C Rungkat	6	6
WC	(Zimbabwe) B Lock (Zimbabwe) CJ Lock	6	7^{7}
Ivan Denisov (Bulgaria) Leonid Sheyngezikht	3	6^{1}
4	(India) SDP Dev (Austria) D Pichler	6^{3}	5
(United States) N Schachter (United States) J Sheehy	7^{7}	7
WC	(United States) A Ayeni (India) Sathi Reddy Chirala	2	7^{7}	[1]
(Argentina) H Casanova (Argentina) JP Paz	6	6^{3}	[10]
(Japan) S Watanabe (Japan) T Yuzuki	2	6^{5}
(Netherlands) M Houkes (France) C Tabur	6	7^{7}
(Israel) D Cukierman (Israel) Y Oliel	4	1^{r}
3	(France) C Denolly (Switzerland) D Wenger	6	3
(Egypt) Akram El Sallaly (Egypt) M Safwat	6	7^{7}
(India) Sai Karteek Reddy Ganta (Burundi) GO Iradukunda	4	6^{3}
B Bobrov (India) Parikshit Somani	2	6^{5}
2	(Australia) T Fancutt (United States) H Reese	6	7^{7}

Quarterfinals
(Thailand) P Isaro (Indonesia) C Rungkat	6	3	[10]
WC	(Zimbabwe) B Lock (Zimbabwe) CJ Lock	4	6	[4]
(United States) N Schachter (United States) J Sheehy	5	3
(Argentina) H Casanova (Argentina) JP Paz	7	6
(Netherlands) M Houkes (France) C Tabur	3	7^{7}	[10]
3	(France) C Denolly (Switzerland) D Wenger	6	6^{4}	[8]
(Egypt) A El Sallaly (Egypt) M Safwat	3	6^{6}
2	(Australia) T Fancutt (United States) H Reese	6	7^{8}

Semifinals
(Thailand) P Isaro (Indonesia) C Rungkat	6	6
(Argentina) H Casanova (Argentina) JP Paz	4	4
(Netherlands) M Houkes (France) C Tabur	6	6
2	(Australia) T Fancutt (United States) H Reese	2	1

Final
(Thailand) P Isaro (Indonesia) C Rungkat	3	6^{4}
(Netherlands) M Houkes (France) C Tabur	6	7^{7}
