= Valentin Royer =

French tennis player (born 2001)

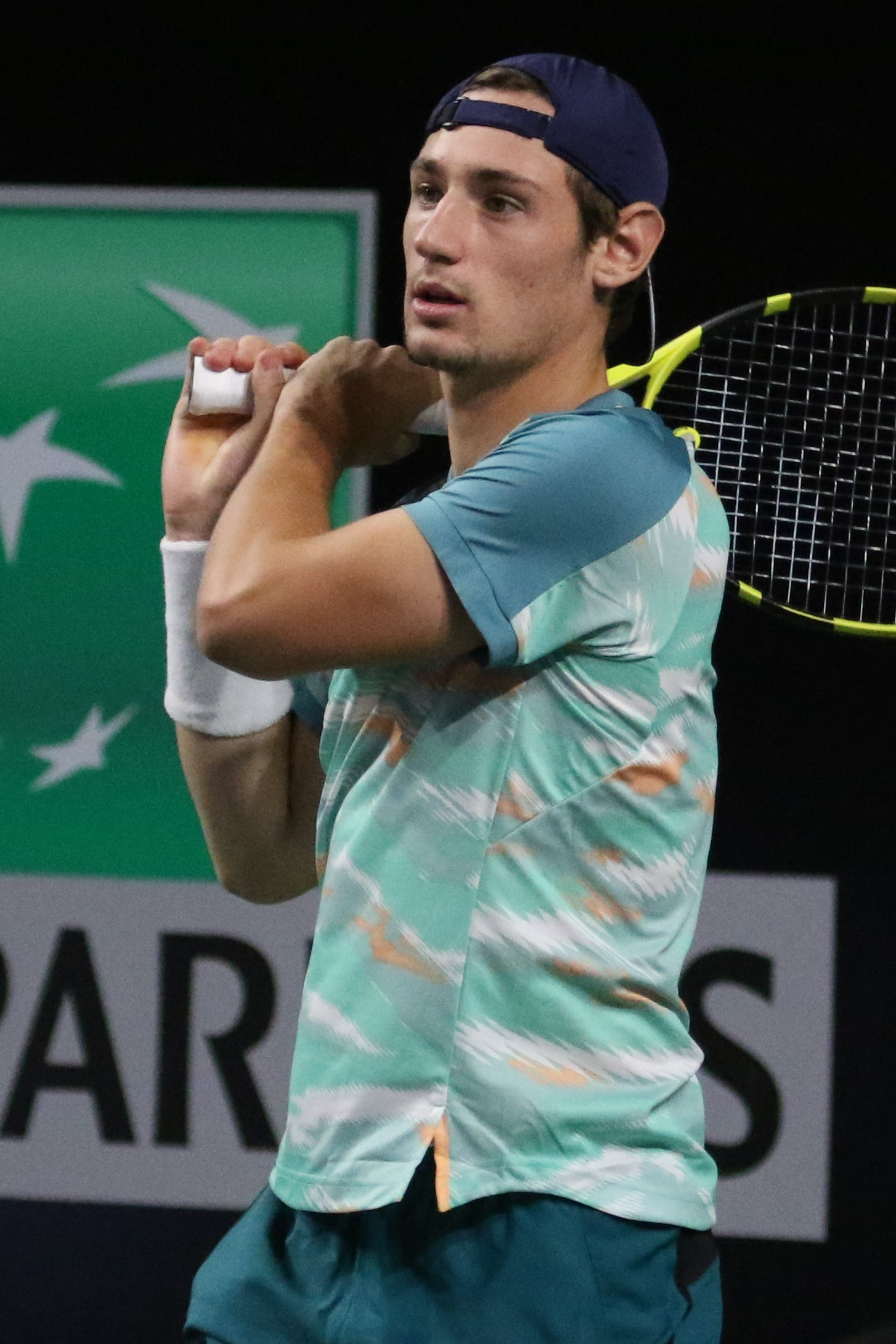
- Country (sports): France
- Born: 29 May 2001 (age 25) Neuilly-sur-Seine, France
- Height: 1.88 m (6 ft 2 in)
- Plays: Right-handed, two handed backhand
- Coach: Julian Gillet
- Prize money: US $2,013,014

Singles
- Career record: 14–30
- Highest ranking: No. 54 (23 February 2026)
- Current ranking: No. 104 (21 September 2026)

Grand Slam singles results
- Australian Open: 1R (2026)
- French Open: 2R (2026)
- Wimbledon: 2R (2025, 2026)
- US Open: 2R (2025)

Doubles
- Career record: 1–4
- Highest ranking: No. 583 (21 September 2026)
- Current ranking: No. 583 (21 September 2026)

Grand Slam doubles results
- French Open: 1R (2025, 2026)
- Wimbledon: 2R (2026)
- Last updated on: 21 September 2026.

Valentin Royer (French: [valɑ̃tɛ̃ ʁwaje]; born 29 May 2001) is a French professional tennis player. He has a career-high ATP singles ranking of world No. 54 achieved on 23 February 2026 and a doubles ranking of No. 583 achieved on 21 September 2026. He is currently the No. 6 singles player from France.

== Early life ==
Royer was born to French parents, but lived in Central and Eastern European countries until he was 17 years old, including the Czech Republic, Serbia, and Poland.

== Career ==
=== 2019: Juniors ===
A member of Ninon Tennis Club in Pornichet, he was European U18 champion in both singles and doubles in 2019, playing doubles alongside Harold Mayot.

=== 2022: First ITF title ===
In May, Royer won his first ITF title in Ulcinj, Montenegro, defeating Samuel Vincent Ruggeri in the final.

=== 2024: Maiden Challenger title, Top 200 ===
In April, he defeated Dennis Novak at the ITF Tour event in Oeiras, Portugal to ensure a ranking high enough to make his debut in senior qualifying for a Grand Slam at the 2024 French Open. In the men's qualifying at Roland Garros in May 2024 he won his first round match against Dmitry Popko. In the second round of qualifying he lost in the deciding set to Thiago Monteiro of Brazil.

In May, Royer reached his first Challenger final in Tunis, losing to Oriol Roca Batalla in the final.

In the first round of qualifying at the 2024 Wimbledon Championships he lost to eventual qualifier Li Tu of Australia. Competing in the qualifying at the 2024 US Open he defeated Hugo Dellien of Bolivia and local player Ethan Quinn before losing to Gabriel Diallo of Canada in the final qualifying round.

In September, Royer won his maiden Challenger title in Sibiu, Romania, defeating compatriot Luka Pavlovic in straight sets in the final.

=== 2025: Major debut & first win, ATP final, top 60 ===
In February, Royer won back-to-back Challenger 100 titles at the two editions of the Rwanda Challenger, defeating Andrej Martin in the final, and the following week at the Rwanda II Challenger, defeating Guy Den Ouden in the final. As a result, Royer reached the top 125 at world No. 121 on 17 March 2025. He reached his third straight final at the 2025 Zadar Open, where he lost to Borna Ćorić, but despite the loss reached the top 115 in the ATP rankings on 24 March 2025.

In May, Royer received a main draw wildcard for the 2025 French Open, marking his Grand Slam debut. He lost to Daniel Elahi Galán in the first round. In June, Royer reached the final at the 2025 Bratislava Open. He lost to Dino Prižmić in the final. In July, Royer made his Wimbledon debut, reaching the main draw as a qualifier after defeating fellow countryman Titouan Droguet in the final round. In the main draw, Royer upset 26th seed Stefanos Tsitsipas recording his first Grand Slam win. He lost in the second round to fellow countryman Adrian Mannarino.

Royer also made his ATP Tour debut as a qualifier at the Canadian Open. He lost in the first round to Nicolas Arseneault. In August, Royer earned his first Masters 1000 win at the 2025 Cincinnati Open as a qualifier, defeating Sebastian Ofner in the first round. He lost in three sets to 14th seed Karen Khachanov in the second round. In August, Royer made his US Open debut after receiving a wildcard into the main draw. He recorded his second major win by defeating Bu Yunchaokete in the first round. At the 2025 Hangzhou Open Royer qualified for the main draw and reached his first ATP final upsetting three seeds en route: top seed Andrey Rublev, recording his first top-20 win, seventh seed Learner Tien and fourth seed Corentin Moutet. As a result he reached a new career-high of No. 76 in the singles rankings on 22 September 2025. He lost to Alexander Bublik in the final.

=== 2026: First French Open win ===
At the 2026 Australian Open, Royer lost in four sets in the first round against American ninth-seed Taylor Fritz.

In May 2026, Royer obtained his first win at the French Open. With his ranking at World No. 74, he defeated Hugo Dellien in the first round before losing to Novak Djokovic in the second round in four sets. He then lost to Alexander Zverev in the at second round at the 2026 Wimbledon Championships.

== Performance timeline ==
Tournament	2024	2025	2026	SR	W–L	Win%
Grand Slam tournaments
Australian Open	A	Q2	1R	0 / 1	0–1	0%
French Open	Q2	1R	2R	0 / 2	1–2	33%
Wimbledon	Q1	2R	2R	0 / 2	2–2	50%
US Open	Q3	2R	1R	0 / 2	1–2	33%
Win–Loss	0–0	2–3	2–4	0 / 7	4–7	36%
ATP 1000 tournaments
Indian Wells Masters	A	A	1R	0 / 1	0–1	0%
Miami Open	A	A	1R	0 / 1	0–1	0%
Monte-Carlo Masters	A	A	A	0 / 0	0–0	–
Madrid Open	A	Q2	1R	0 / 1	0–1	0%
Italian Open	A	Q2	1R	0 / 1	0–1	0%
Canada Masters	A	1R	2R	0 / 2	1–2	33%
Cincinnati Open	A	2R	1R	0 / 2	1–2	33%
Shanghai Masters	A	2R		0 / 1	1–1	50%
Paris Masters	A	1R		0 / 1	0–1	0%
Win–Loss	0–0	2–4	1–6	0 / 10	3–10	23%

== ATP Tour finals ==
=== Singles: 1 (runner-up) ===
Legend Grand Slam (0–0) ATP 1000 (0–0) ATP 500 (0–0) ATP 250 (0–1)	Finals by surface Hard (0–1) Clay (0–0) Grass (0–0)	Finals by setting Outdoor (0–0) Indoor (0–0)

Result	W–L	Date	Tournament	Tier	Surface	Opponent	Score
Loss	0–1	Sep 2025	Hangzhou Open, China	ATP 250	Hard	(Kazakhstan) Alexander Bublik	6–7^{(4–7)}, 6–7^{(4–7)}

== ATP Challenger Tour finals ==
=== Singles: 8 (4 titles, 4 runner-ups) ===
Legend ATP Challenger Tour (4–4)	Finals by surface Hard (1–0) Clay (3–4)

Result	W–L	Date	Tournament	Tier	Surface	Opponent	Score
Loss	0–1	May 2024	Tunis Open, Tunisia	Challenger	Clay	(Spain) Oriol Roca Batalla	6–7^{(5–7)}, 5–7
Win	1–1	Sep 2024	Sibiu Open, Romania	Challenger	Clay	(France) Luka Pavlovic	6–4, 6–0
Win	2–1	Feb 2025	Rwanda Challenger, Rwanda	Challenger	Clay	(Slovakia) Andrej Martin	6–1, 6–2
Win	3–1	Mar 2025	Rwanda Challenger II, Rwanda	Challenger	Clay	(Netherlands) Guy Den Ouden	6–2, 6–4
Loss	3–2	Mar 2025	Zadar Open, Croatia	Challenger	Clay	(Croatia) Borna Ćorić	6–3, 2–6, 3–6
Loss	3–3	Jun 2025	Bratislava Open, Slovakia	Challenger	Clay	(Croatia) Dino Prižmić	4–6, 6–7^{(6–8)}
Loss	3–4	Apr 2026	Open de Oeiras, Portugal	Challenger	Clay	Roman Safiullin	1–6, 2–6
Win	4–4	Aug 2026	Kingston Open, Jamaica	Challenger	Hard	(Spain) Pedro Martínez	6–4, 6–2

== ITF World Tennis Tour finals ==
=== Singles: 13 (7 titles, 6 runner-ups) ===
Legend ITF WTT (7–6)	Finals by surface Hard (4–3) Clay (3–3)

Result	W–L	Date	Tournament	Tier	Surface	Opponent	Score
Loss	0–1	Nov 2019	M15 Mishref, Kuwait	WTT	Hard	(Serbia) Marko Tepavac	4–6, 4–6
Loss	0–2	Jun 2021	M25 Grasse, France	WTT	Clay	(Spain) Álvaro López San Martín	6–7^{(6–8)}, 5–7
Loss	0–3	Sep 2021	M25 Falun, Sweden	WTT	Hard	(Japan) Shintaro Imai	6–2, 6–7^{(2–7)}, 2–6
Loss	0–4	Apr 2022	M15 Antalya, Turkey	WTT	Clay	(Serbia) Hamad Medjedovic	3–6, 2–6
Win	1–4	May 2022	M15 Ulcinj, Montenegro	WTT	Clay	(Italy) Samuel Vincent Ruggeri	6–2, 6–2
Loss	1–5	May 2022	M25 Ulcinj, Montenegro	WTT	Clay	(Italy) Samuel Vincent Ruggeri	7–6^{(7–2)}, 1–6, 5–7
Win	2–5	Jul 2022	M25 Casinalbo, Italy	WTT	Clay	(Italy) Francesco Forti	3–6, 6–3, 6–4
Win	3–5	Feb 2023	M25 Vila Real de Santo António, Portugal	WTT	Hard	(Italy) Gabriele Piraino	7–5, 4–6, 6–3
Win	4–5	Jun 2023	M15 Rabat, Morocco	WTT	Clay	(Spain) Pedro Rodenas	5–7, 7–6^{(7–5)}, 6–2
Loss	4–6	Oct 2023	M25 Tavira, Portugal	WTT	Hard	(Portugal) Henrique Rocha	4–6, 4–6
Win	5–6	Oct 2023	M15 Heraklion, Greece	WTT	Hard	(Czech Republic) Matthew William Donald	6–1, 6–1
Win	6–6	Nov 2023	M25 Heraklion, Greece	WTT	Hard	(France) Jules Marie	6–3, 7–5
Win	7–6	Mar 2024	M25 Santa Margherita di Pula, Italy	WTT	Clay	(Croatia) Nino Serdarušić	6–3, 6–3

=== Doubles: 3 (2 titles, 1 runner-up) ===
Legend ITF WTT (2–1)

Result	W–L	Date	Tournament	Tier	Surface	Partner	Opponents	Score
Win	1–0	Sep 2020	M15 Melilla, Spain	WTT	Clay	(Denmark) Holger Rune	(Spain) José Vidal Azorín (Netherlands) Max Houkes	7–5, 6–3
Win	2–0	Aug 2021	M25 Pitești, Romania	WTT	Clay	(Chinese Taipei) Tseng Chun-hsin	(France) Corentin Denolly (France) Clément Tabur	4–6, 6–2, [10–8]
Loss	2–1	May 2022	M25 Ulcinj, Montenegro	WTT	Clay	(Romania) Cezar Crețu	Ivan Liutarevich (Italy) Marcello Serafini	6–4, 1–6, [6–10]

*As of 24 October 2025
