= Daniel Michalski =

Polish tennis player (born 2000)

- Country (sports): Poland
- Born: 11 January 2000 (age 26) Warsaw, Poland
- Height: 1.80 m (5 ft 11 in)
- Turned pro: 2018
- Coach: Tomasz Iwański
- Prize money: US $296,972

Singles
- Career record: 1–4 (at ATP Tour level, Grand Slam level, and in Davis Cup)
- Career titles: 0
- Highest ranking: No. 241 (9 February 2026)
- Current ranking: No. 300 (19 October 2026)

Grand Slam singles results
- US Open Junior: QF (2018)

Doubles
- Career record: 0–0 (at ATP Tour level, Grand Slam level, and in Davis Cup)
- Career titles: 0
- Highest ranking: No. 499 (8 March 2021)
- Current ranking: No. 748 (19 October 2026)
- Last updated on: 19 October 2026.

Daniel Michalski (Polish pronunciation: [ˈdaɲɛl miˈxalskʲi]; born 11 January 2000) is a Polish tennis player. He has a career high ATP singles ranking of No. 241 achieved on 9 February 2026 and a doubles ranking of No. 499 achieved on 8 March 2021. Michalski represents Poland at the Davis Cup, where he has a W/L record of 1–0, and the 2026 United Cup.

In 2018, Michalski made his debut for the Polish tennis team in a Davis Cup match, where Poland won 4–1 against Zimbabwe. In 2019, he reached the final of the Polish Singles Championship, losing against Paweł Ciaś 4-6, 4-6. One year later, Michalski won the silver medal at the same tournament, losing against Kacper Żuk 6–7 in the final. In 2022, he became the Polish Singles Champion, defeating Jan Zieliński 6–2 in the final.

== ATP Challenger and ITF Tour finals ==
=== Singles: 29 (18–11) ===
Legend ATP Challenger Tour (0–1) ITF World Tennis Tour (18–10)	Finals by surface Hard (0–2) Clay (18–9) Grass (0–0) Carpet (0–0)

Result	W–L	Date	Tournament	Tier	Surface	Opponent	Score
Loss	0–1	Apr 2019	M15, Sharm el-Sheikh, Egypt	World Tennis Tour	Hard	(Slovakia) Lukáš Klein	2–6, 3–6
Loss	0–2	Aug 2019	M25, Bydgoszcz, Poland	World Tennis Tour	Clay	(Peru) Nicolás Álvarez	5–7, 3–6
Win	1–2	Sep 2019	M15, Cairo, Egypt	World Tennis Tour	Clay	(France) Matthieu Perchicot	6–2, 7–6^{(7–3)}
Win	2–2	Nov 2019	M15, Cairo, Egypt	World Tennis Tour	Clay	(Argentina) Facundo Juarez	6–4, 6–3
Loss	2–3	Oct 2020	M15, Monastir, Tunisia	World Tennis Tour	Hard	(Lithuania) Laurynas Grigelis	7–5, 5–7, 6–7^{(8–10)}
Loss	2–4	Mar 2021	M15, Antalya, Turkey	World Tennis Tour	Clay	(Serbia) Miljan Zekić	6–7^{(6–8)}, 3–6
Loss	2–5	Apr 2021	M15, Cairo, Egypt	World Tennis Tour	Clay	(United States) Oliver Crawford	2–6, 7–5, 3–6
Win	3–5	Oct 2021	M15, Antalya, Turkey	World Tennis Tour	Clay	(Romania) David Ionel	6–3, 6–4
Win	4–5	Nov 2021	M15, Antalya, Turkey	World Tennis Tour	Clay	(United Kingdom) Billy Harris	2-6, 6–1, 6-3
Win	5–5	Nov 2021	M15, Antalya, Turkey	World Tennis Tour	Clay	(Romania) Cezar Crețu	7-6^{(7-2)}, 6-2
Win	6–5	Jan 2022	M15, Cairo, Egypt	World Tennis Tour	Clay	(Russia) Andrey Chepelev	7-6^{(7-3)}, 6-2
Win	7–5	Jan 2022	M15, Cairo, Egypt	World Tennis Tour	Clay	(Austria) David Pichler	6-4, 6-3
Loss	7–6	Mar 2022	Zadar, Croatia	Challenger	Clay	(Italy) Flavio Cobolli	4-6, 2-6
Win	8–6	Oct 2022	M25, Santa Margherita di Pula, Italy	World Tennis Tour	Clay	(Germany) Timo Stodder	7-6^{(7-0)}, 6-3
Win	9–6	Apr 2023	M25, Santa Margherita di Pula, Italy	World Tennis Tour	Clay	(France) Timo Legout	6-4, 6-3
Loss	9–7	Apr 2023	M25, Santa Margherita di Pula, Italy	World Tennis Tour	Clay	(Portugal) Gonçalo Oliveira	3-6, 2-6
Win	10–7	May 2023	M25, Santa Margherita di Pula, Italy	World Tennis Tour	Clay	(Germany) Sebastian Fanselow	6-1, 6-2
Win	11–7	Sep 2023	M25, Santa Margherita di Pula, Italy	World Tennis Tour	Clay	(Italy) Federico Arnaboldi	2-6, 6-4, 6-2
Loss	11–8	Oct 2023	M25, Santa Margherita di Pula, Italy	World Tennis Tour	Clay	(Spain) Oriol Roca Batalla	6–2, 1–6, 4–6
Win	12–8	Aug 2024	M25, Poznań, Poland	World Tennis Tour	Clay	(Czech Republic) Michael Vrbensky	5–7, 6–4, 6–4
Win	13–8	Sep 2024	M25, Santa Margherita di Pula, Italy	World Tennis Tour	Clay	(Italy) Niccolo Catini	6–0, 6–4
Win	14–8	Feb 2025	M25, Antalya, Turkey	World Tennis Tour	Clay	(Czech Republic) Zdeněk Kolář	7–6^{(7–5)}, 6–1
Loss	14–9	Apr 2025	M25, Antalya, Turkey	World Tennis Tour	Clay	(Croatia) Luka Mikrut	2–6, 5–7
Loss	14–10	Sep 2025	M25, Santa Margherita di Pula, Italy	World Tennis Tour	Clay	(Italy) Jacopo Berrettini	1–6, 5–7
Win	15–10	Sep 2025	M25, Santa Margherita di Pula, Italy	World Tennis Tour	Clay	(Italy) Michele Ribecai	6–3, 7–5
Loss	15–11	Oct 2025	M25, Santa Margherita di Pula, Italy	World Tennis Tour	Clay	(United Kingdom) Felix Gill	6–7^{(5–7)}, 5–7
Win	16–11	Aug 2026	M15, Kraków, Poland	World Tennis Tour	Clay	(Republic of Ireland) Michael Agwi	6–2, 3–0 ret.
Win	17–11	Aug 2026	M25, Poznań, Poland	World Tennis Tour	Clay	(United States) Michael Savano	6–2, 6–1
Win	18–11	Sep 2026	M25, Santa Margherita di Pula, Italy	World Tennis Tour	Clay	(France) Laurent Lokoli	7–6^{(7–5)}, 6–2

=== Doubles: 11 (5–6) ===
Legend ATP Challenger Tour (0–0) ITF World Tennis Tour (5–6)	Finals by surface Hard (2–3) Clay (3–3) Grass (0–0) Carpet (0–0)

Result	W–L	Date	Tournament	Tier	Surface	Partner	Opponents	Score
Loss	0–1	Feb 2019	Sharm el-Sheikh, Egypt M15	World Tennis Tour	Hard	(Czech Republic) David Poljak	(Spain) Andrés Artuñedo (Spain) Pablo Vivero González	4–6, 4–6
Loss	0–2	Mar 2019	Sharm el-Sheikh, Egypt M15	World Tennis Tour	Hard	(Poland) Kacper Żuk	(Ukraine) Marat Deviatiarov (Switzerland) Jakub Paul	3–6, 4–6
Win	1–2	Apr 2019	Sharm el-Sheikh, Egypt M15	World Tennis Tour	Hard	(Poland) Michal Dembek	(Czech Republic) Marek Jaloviec (Slovakia) Lukáš Klein	6–2, 3–6, [10–8]
Loss	1–3	Jun 2019	Tabarka, Tunisia M15	World Tennis Tour	Clay	(Poland) Kacper Żuk	(United Kingdom) Toby Martin (United Kingdom) Barnaby Smith	7–5, 1–6, [8–10]
Loss	1–4	Oct 2019	Sharm el-Sheikh, Egypt M15	World Tennis Tour	Hard	(Poland) Piotr Matuszewski	(United Kingdom) Julien Cash (Poland) Jan Zieliński	6–7^{(2–7)}, 6–7^{(3–7)}
Loss	1–5	Nov 2019	Cairo, Egypt M15	World Tennis Tour	Clay	(Poland) Piotr Matuszewski	(Italy) Fabrizio Ornago (Argentina) Matias Zukas	2–3 RET
Win	2–5	Feb 2020	Antalya, Turkey M15	World Tennis Tour	Clay	(Czech Republic) Michael Vrbenský	(Netherlands) Max Houkes (Spain) David Jordà Sanchis	6–1, 2–6, [12–10]
Win	3–5	Oct 2020	Monastir, Tunisia M15	World Tennis Tour	Clay	(Italy) Marco Bortolotti	(Argentina) Facundo Juarez (Brazil) Gabriel Roveri Sidney	4–6, 6–2, [10–6]
Win	4–5	Feb 2021	Monastir, Tunisia M15	World Tennis Tour	Hard	(Spain) Carlos Sánchez Jover	(Germany) Konstantin Schmitz (Germany) Kai Wehnelt	6–4, 7–5
Win	5–5	Oct 2021	Antalya, Turkey M15	World Tennis Tour	Clay	(Hungary) Gergely Madarász	(Romania) Mircea-Alexandru Jecan (Romania) Dan Alexandru Tomescu	6–4, 6–3
Loss	5–6	Jan 2022	Cairo, Egypt M15	World Tennis Tour	Clay	(Zimbabwe) Benjamin Lock	(Chinese Taipei) Ray Ho (Kazakhstan) Grigoriy Lomakin	6–7^{(2–7)}, 6–7^{(3–7)}
