= Marco Trungelliti =

Argentine tennis player

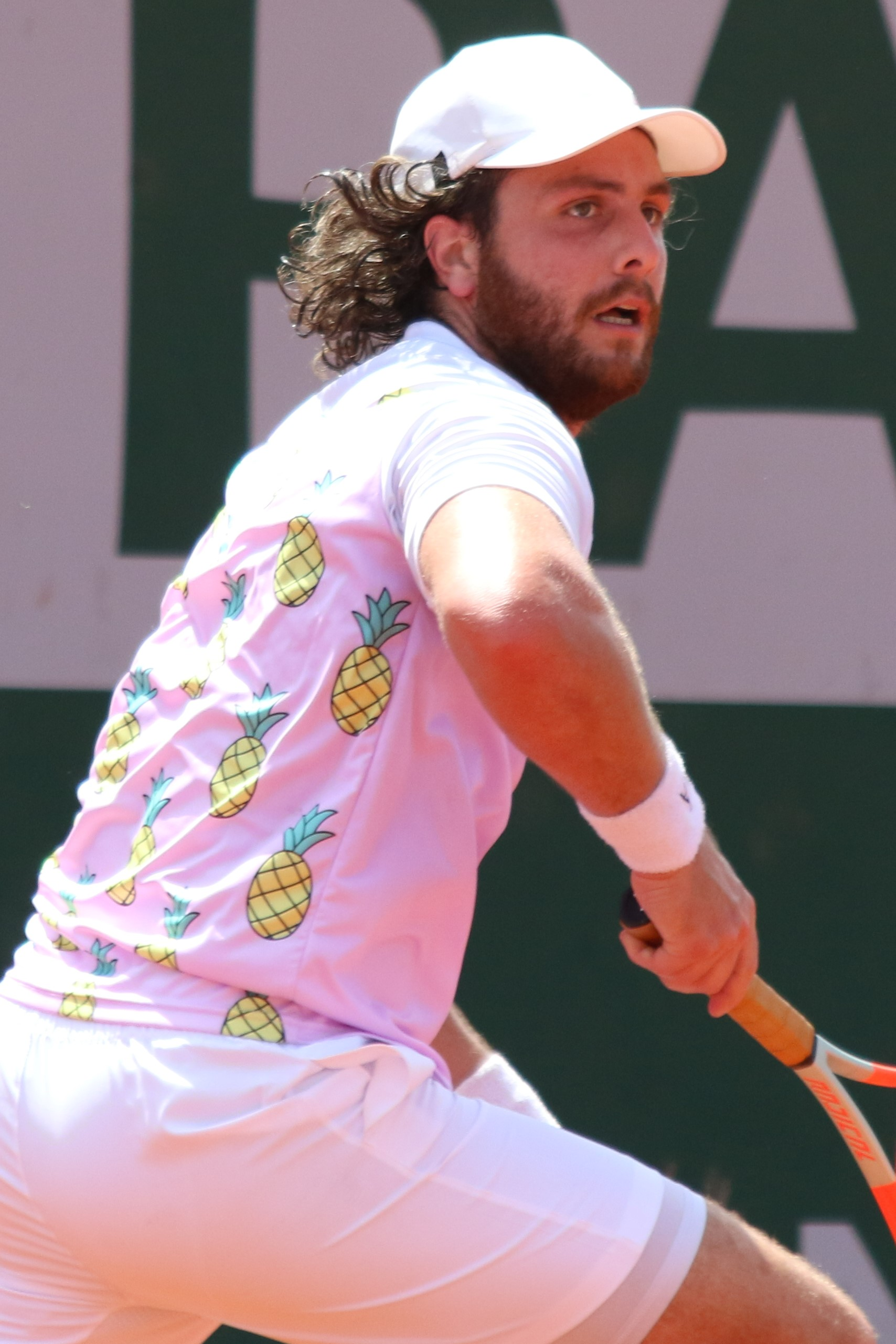
- Trungelliti at the 2022 French Open
- Country (sports): Argentina
- Residence: Ordino, Andorra
- Born: 31 January 1990 (age 36) Santiago del Estero, Argentina
- Height: 1.78 m (5 ft 10 in)
- Turned pro: 2008
- Plays: Right-handed (two-handed backhand)
- Coach: Albert Portas, Jean-Baptiste Poux
- Prize money: US $2,777,115

Singles
- Career record: 25–38
- Career titles: 0
- Highest ranking: No. 76 (6 April 2026)
- Current ranking: No. 88 (9 November 2026)

Grand Slam singles results
- Australian Open: 2R (2016)
- French Open: 2R (2016, 2017, 2018, 2026)
- Wimbledon: 1R (2021, 2026)
- US Open: 2R (2021, 2026)

Doubles
- Career record: 1–3
- Career titles: 0
- Highest ranking: No. 174 (1 April 2013)
- Current ranking: No. 597 (31 August 2026)

Grand Slam doubles results
- French Open: 1R (2026)
- Wimbledon: 2R (2026)
- Last updated on: 31 August 2026.

Marco Trungelliti (Spanish pronunciation: [ˈmaɾko tɾuɲɟʝeˈliti]; born 31 January 1990) is an Argentine professional tennis player who competes mainly on the ATP Challenger Tour. On 6 April 2026, Trungelliti reached a career-high singles ranking of world No. 76 and became the second-oldest man (since 1973) in the Open Era, at age 36, to debut in the top 100 in the ATP rankings, after reaching the final in Marrakech. He also reached a best doubles ranking of No. 174 on 1 April 2013.

Trungelliti has reached 34 career singles finals with a record of 15 wins and 19 losses which includes a 6–11 record in ATP Challenger Tour finals. In addition, he has reached 13 doubles finals with a record of 7 wins and 6 losses which included a 3–3 record in ATP Challenger Tour finals.

== Career ==
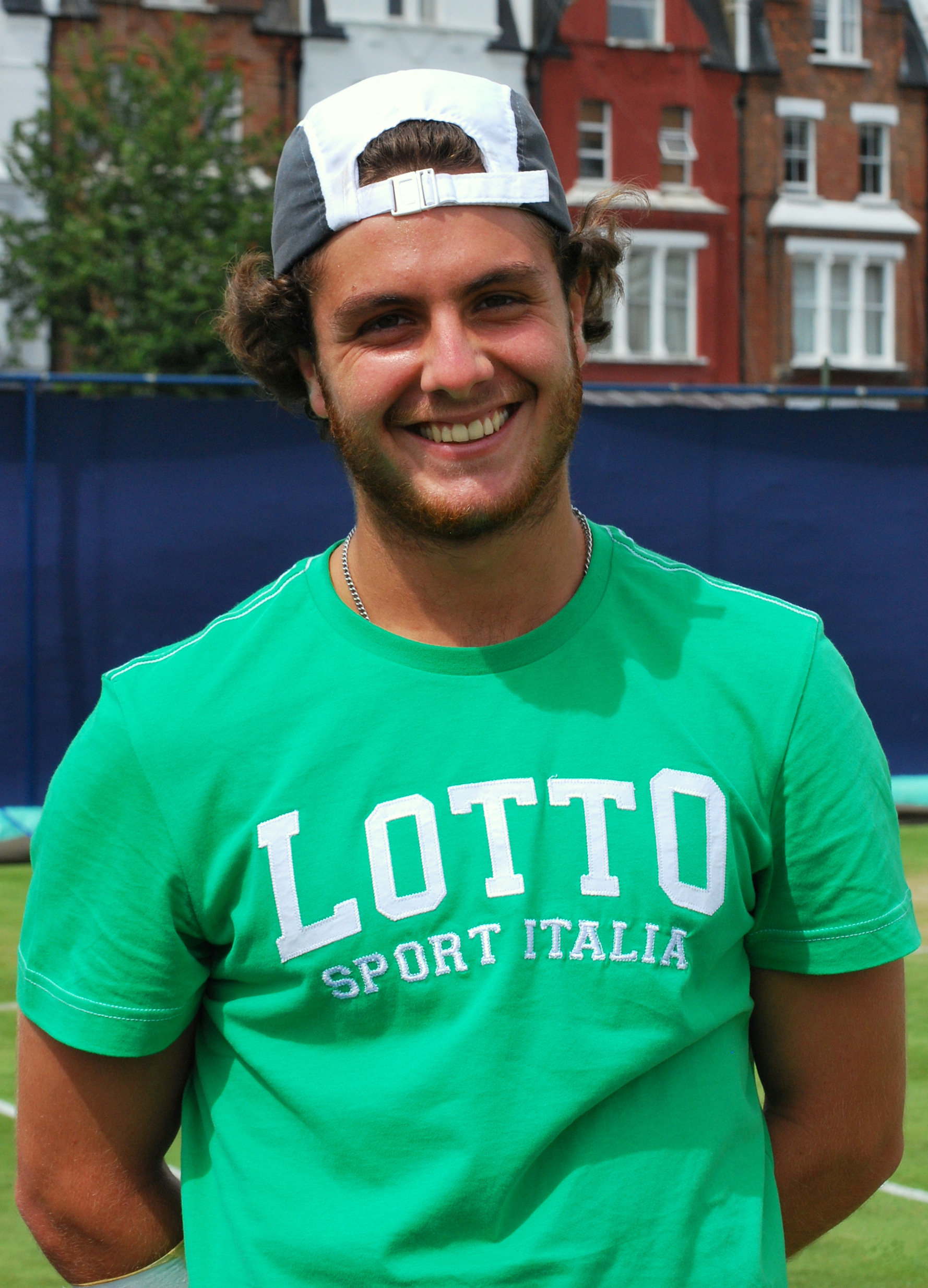
Trungelliti at Queen's Club in 2012

=== 2012: ATP debut ===
Trungelliti made his ATP Tour debut at the 2012 Croatian Open where he advanced through the 3 qualifying rounds by defeating Juan-Martín Aranguren, Jose Anton Salazar Martin and Adrián Menéndez Maceiras to make his first appearance in a main draw. In the first round, he would go on to defeat Paolo Lorenzi before losing in the second round to Carlos Berlocq 6–7^{(4)}.

=== 2016-2019: Major & Masters debuts, first wins and top-10 win ===
In 2016, he qualified for two consecutive Grand Slams for the first time in his career at the 2016 Australian Open and at the 2016 French Open. He reached the second round in both Grand Slams, beating Jozef Kovalík on the hardcourts of the first major of the season, and achieving his first and only victory against a top player, defeating 10th seed Marin Čilić, on the Parisian clay at Roland Garros. In March, he also reached his first Masters 1000 main draw, via the qualifying stage, in Indian Wells.

At the 2018 French Open Trungelliti drove for 10 hours from Barcelona to Paris to be a late replacement for the injured Nick Kyrgios who had been due to face his compatriot Bernard Tomic. He only arrived to sign in shortly before midnight, and the match was scheduled first on court the following morning. Despite this Trungelliti defeated Tomic in four sets to make the second round at Roland Garros. He had been joined in his car journey by his mother and 89-year-old grandmother who had happened to have been visiting from Argentina at the time. He lost to Marco Cecchinato in the second round. In July, he reached his first ATP Tour semifinal at the Croatia Open.

=== 2021–2025: Wimbledon debut, US Open win, back to top 150 ===
Between June 2021 and January 2022, he qualified for three consecutive Grand Slams for the first time in his career at the 2021 Wimbledon Championships, the 2021 US Open and at the 2022 Australian Open. He became the only Argentine to qualify at the All England Club and the only South American to qualify at the US Open in 2021. The Argentine saved six match points to defeat American Aleksander Kovacevic in the final round of qualifying at the US Open, to make just his eight main draw appearance at a Major. He defeated 29th seed Alejandro Davidovich Fokina in the first round to reach the second round for the first time at this Major before losing to fellow Argentine Facundo Bagnis. At the 2022 Australian Open he qualified again but lost in the first round in a five set match against Frances Tiafoe. Ranked No. 197, he qualified for the ATP 500 2024 Barcelona Open Banc Sabadell and reached the round of 16, defeating qualifier Duje Ajduković and upsetting ninth seed Nicolás Jarry.

=== 2026: Oldest man in Open Era in his maiden ATP final, top 100 ===
Trungelliti at the 2026 Cincinnati Open

Aged 36 years and 62 days old, Trungelliti became the second-oldest man in the Open Era, since Torben Ulrich in 1973, to debut in the top 100 in the singles ATP rankings after reaching the semifinals in Marrakech as a qualifier. Trungelliti also tied Andreas Vinciguerra for the longest gap between semifinal appearances on the ATP Tour, 402 weeks after reaching his first at tour level in Umag, Croatia in 2018. By reaching the final in Marrakech, with a win over top seed and defending champion Luciano Darderi, Trungelliti also became the oldest man to make his first career ATP Tour final in the Open Era.

== Personal life ==
=== Match-fixing testimony ===
Trungelliti was contacted by match-fixers in 2015 who told him that players could earn from a few thousand dollars for fixing a Futures level match up-to $50,000 to $100,000 for fixing an ATP level event. Trungelliti reported the event to the Tennis Integrity Unit (TIU) and the subsequent investigation which finished in 2017 led to bans for Argentine players Patricio Heras, Federico Coria, and Nicolás Kicker. Following his testimony, Trungelliti was forced to leave Argentina permanently for the safety of himself and his family after receiving threats.

== Performance timelines ==
Key
| W | F | SF | QF | #R | RR | Q# | P# | DNQ | A | Z# | PO | G | S | B | NMS | NTI | P | NH |

(W) winner; (F) finalist; (SF) semifinalist; (QF) quarterfinalist; (#R) rounds 4, 3, 2, 1; (RR) round-robin stage; (Q#) qualification round; (P#) preliminary round; (DNQ) did not qualify; (A) absent; (Z#) Davis/Fed Cup Zonal Group (with number indication) or (PO) play-off; (G) gold, (S) silver or (B) bronze Olympic/Paralympic medal; (NMS) not a Masters tournament; (NTI) not a Tier I tournament; (P) postponed; (NH) not held; (SR) strike rate (events won / competed); (W–L) win–loss record.
To avoid confusion and double counting, these charts are updated at the conclusion of a tournament or when the player's participation has ended.

=== Singles ===
Current through 2026

| Tournament | 2012 | 2013 | 2014 | 2015 | 2016 | 2017 | 2018 | 2019 | 2020 | 2021 | 2022 | 2023 | 2024 | 2025 | 2026 | SR | W–L | Win % |
|---|---|---|---|---|---|---|---|---|---|---|---|---|---|---|---|---|---|---|
Grand Slam tournaments
| Australian Open | A | A | A | Q1 | 2R | Q3 | Q1 | Q3 | 1R | Q1 | 1R | Q3 | Q1 | Q1 | Q3 | 0 / 3 | 1–3 | 25% |
| French Open | Q1 | Q1 | A | Q3 | 2R | 2R | 2R | Q1 | Q1 | Q3 | Q3 | A | Q2 | Q1 | 2R | 0 / 4 | 4–4 | 50% |
| Wimbledon | Q2 | Q1 | A | A | Q1 | Q1 | Q1 | Q1 | NH | 1R | A | Q1 | Q2 | Q2 | 1R | 0 / 2 | 0–2 | 0% |
| US Open | Q2 | A | A | A | Q1 | Q2 | Q3 | 1R | A | 2R | Q1 | Q1 | Q2 | Q3 | | 0 / 2 | 1–2 | 33% |
| Win–loss | 0–0 | 0–0 | 0–0 | 0–0 | 2–2 | 1–1 | 1–1 | 0–1 | 0–1 | 1–2 | 0–1 | 0–0 | 0–0 | 0–0 | 1–1 | 0 / 10 | 6–10 | 38% |
ATP Masters 1000
| Indian Wells Masters | A | A | A | Q1 | 1R | Q2 | A | Q1 | NH | A | A | A | A | A | A | 0 / 1 | 0–1 | – |
| Miami Open | A | A | A | A | Q2 | A | A | A | NH | A | A | A | A | Q2 | A | 0 / 0 | 0–0 | – |
| Monte Carlo Masters | A | A | A | A | A | A | A | Q2 | NH | A | A | A | A | A | A | 0 / 0 | 0–0 | – |
| Madrid Open | A | A | A | A | A | A | A | A | NH | A | A | A | A | A | 1R | 0 / 1 | 0–1 | 0% |
| Italian Open | A | A | A | A | A | A | A | A | A | A | A | A | A | A | 1R | 0 / 1 | 0–1 | 0% |
| Canadian Open | A | A | A | A | A | A | A | A | NH | A | A | A | A | A | Q1 | 0 / 0 | 0–0 | 0% |
| Cincinnati Masters | A | A | A | A | A | A | A | A | A | A | A | A | A | A | 2R | 0 / 1 | 1–1 | 50% |
| Shanghai Masters | A | A | A | A | A | A | A | A | NH | | | A | Q2 | A | | 0 / 0 | 0–0 | – |
| Paris Masters | A | A | A | A | A | A | A | A | A | A | A | A | A | | | 0 / 0 | 0–0 | – |
| Win–loss | 0–0 | 0–0 | 0–0 | 0–0 | 0–0 | 0–0 | 0–0 | 0–0 | 0–0 | 0–0 | 0–0 | 0–0 | 0–0 | 0–0 | 1–3 | 0 / 4 | 1–4 | 0% |
Career statistics
| Overall win–loss | 1–1 | 1–1 | 0–0 | 0–0 | 2–4 | 1–2 | 5–3 | 2–3 | 0–1 | 1–2 | 0–2 | 0–1 | 4–4 | 0–1 | 5–7 | 21-33 | 39% | |
| Year-end ranking | 200 | 275 | 247 | 223 | 146 | 220 | 123 | 209 | 241 | 199 | 223 | 229 | 143 | 131 | | $2,395,569 | | |

== ATP Tour finals ==
=== Singles: 1 (runner-up) ===
| Legend Grand Slam (–) ATP 1000 (–) ATP 500 (–) ATP 250 (0–1) | Finals by surface Hard (–) Clay (0–1) Grass (–) | Finals by setting Outdoor (0–1) Indoor (–) |

| Result | W–L | Date | Tournament | Tier | Surface | Opponent | Score |
|---|---|---|---|---|---|---|---|
| Loss | 0–1 | Apr 2026 | Grand Prix Hassan II, Morocco | ATP 250 | Clay | (Spain) Rafael Jódar | 3–6, 2–6 |

== ATP Challenger and ITF Tour finals ==
=== Singles: 35 (16–19) ===
| Legend ATP Challenger Tour (7–11) ITF Futures/World Tennis Tour (9–8) | Finals by surface Hard (0–1) Clay (16–18) |

| Result | W–L | Date | Tournament | Tier | Surface | Opponent | Score |
|---|---|---|---|---|---|---|---|
| Win | 1–0 | Jul 2008 | Argentina F6, Villa María | Futures | Clay | (Argentina) Diego Álvarez | 7–6^{(7–3)}, 6–3 |
| Win | 2–0 | Nov 2008 | Argentina F15, Bahía Blanca | Futures | Clay | (Argentina) Guido Pella | 6–1, 6–2 |
| Win | 3–0 | Jun 2009 | Argentina F8, Rafaela | Futures | Clay | (Chile) Guillermo Rivera Aránguiz | 4–6, 6–2, 5–1 ret. |
| Loss | 3–1 | Oct 2009 | Argentina F17, Santiago del Estero | Futures | Clay | (Argentina) Agustin Picco | 7–5, 6–7^{(4–7)}, 4–6 |
| Win | 4–1 | Nov 2009 | Argentina F22, Bahía Blanca | Futures | Clay | (Argentina) Lionel Noviski | 7–6^{(7–4)}, 6–4 |
| Win | 5–1 | Jun 2010 | Argentina F8, Córdoba | Futures | Clay | (Argentina) Guillermo Durán | 6–3, 4–6, 6–2 |
| Loss | 5–2 | Jul 2010 | Argentina F13, Corrientes | Futures | Clay | (Argentina) Guido Pella | 6–3, 1–6, 2–6 |
| Loss | 5–3 | Nov 2010 | Argentina F22, Rosario | Futures | Clay | (Argentina) Andrés Molteni | 2–6, 0–6 |
| Win | 6–3 | May 2011 | Argentina F5, Villa del Dique | Futures | Clay | (Argentina) Diego Schwartzman | 6–4, 6–2 |
| Loss | 6–4 | May 2011 | Paraguay F2, Asunción | Futures | Clay | (Peru) Duilio Beretta | 6–4, 6–7^{(2–7)}, 3–6 |
| Loss | 6–5 | Sep 2013 | Quito, Ecuador | Challenger | Clay | (Dominican Republic) Víctor Estrella Burgos | 6–2, 4–6, 4–6 |
| Loss | 6–6 | May 2014 | Cali, Colombia | Challenger | Clay | (Chile) Gonzalo Lama | 3–6, 6–4, 3–6 |
| Loss | 6–7 | Jul 2014 | Argentina F10, Buenos Aires | Futures | Clay | (Argentina) Andrés Molteni | 2–6, 6–0, 1–6 |
| Loss | 6–8 | Sep 2014 | Ecuador F6, Ibarra | Futures | Clay | (Ecuador) Giovanni Lapentti | 2–6, 6–7^{(4–7)} |
| Win | 7–8 | Nov 2014 | Brazil F13, Santa Maria | Futures | Clay | (Brazil) Fabiano de Paula | 4–6, 7–5, 6–1 |
| Loss | 7–9 | Sep 2015 | Bangkok, Thailand | Challenger | Hard | (Japan) Yūichi Sugita | 4-6, 2–6 |
| Loss | 7–10 | Jul 2016 | Marburg, Germany | Challenger | Clay | (Czech Republic) Jan Šátral | 2-6, 4–6 |
| Loss | 7–11 | Mar 2018 | Spain F6, Xabia | Futures | Clay | (Belgium) Germain Gigounon | 4–6, 3–6 |
| Win | 8–11 | Apr 2018 | Barletta, Italy | Challenger | Clay | (Italy) Simone Bolelli | 2–6, 7–6^{(7–4)}, 6–4 |
| Loss | 8–12 | Oct 2018 | Florence, Italy | Challenger | Clay | (Spain) Pablo Andújar | 5–7, 3–6 |
| Win | 9–12 | Sep 2019 | Florence, Italy | Challenger | Clay | (Portugal) Pedro Sousa | 6-2, 6–3 |
| Loss | 9–13 | Nov 2020 | M15 Villena, Spain | World Tennis Tour | Clay | (Spain) Pol Martín Tiffon | 4–6, 4–6 |
| Loss | 9–14 | Jun 2021 | Biella, Italy | Challenger | Clay | (Denmark) Holger Rune | 3–6, 7–5, 6–7^{(5–7)} |
| Loss | 9–15 | Apr 2022 | Madrid, Spain | Challenger | Clay | (Argentina) Pedro Cachin | 3–6, 7–6^{(7–3)}, 3–6 |
| Loss | 9–16 | Aug 2022 | Santo Domingo, Dominican Republic | Challenger | Clay | (Argentina) Pedro Cachin | 4–6, 6–2, 3–6 |
| Loss | 9–17 | Aug 2023 | Santo Domingo, Dominican Republic | Challenger | Clay | (Argentina) Genaro Alberto Olivieri | 5–7, 6–2, 4–6 |
| Win | 10–17 | Nov 2023 | M15 Valencia, Spain | World Tennis Tour | Clay | (Spain) Carlos Gimeno Valero | 6–0, 6–2 |
| Win | 11–17 | Dec 2023 | M15 Madrid, Spain | World Tennis Tour | Clay | (Spain) Pol Martín Tiffon | 6–4, 6–2 |
| Loss | 11–18 | Feb 2024 | Kigali, Rwanda | Challenger | Clay | (Poland) Kamil Majchrzak | 4–6, 4–6 |
| Win | 12–18 | Mar 2024 | Kigali, Rwanda | Challenger | Clay | (France) Clément Tabur | 6–4, 6–2 |
| Loss | 12–19 | May 2024 | Vicenza, Italy | Challenger | Clay | (Chinese Taipei) Tseng Chun-hsin | 3–6, 2–6 |
| Win | 13–19 | Jun 2025 | Lyon, France | Challenger | Clay | (Spain) Daniel Mérida | 6–3, 4–6, 6–3 |
| Win | 14–19 | Sep 2025 | Tulln, Austria | Challenger | Clay | (Czech Republic) Andrew Paulson | 7–5, 6–1 |
| Win | 15–19 | Sep 2025 | Târgu Mureș, Romania | Challenger | Clay | (Croatia) Mili Poljičak | 6–1 ret. |
| Win | 16–19 | Mar 2026 | Kigali, Rwanda | Challenger | Clay | (Italy) Marco Cecchinato | 4–6, 6–0, 6–3 |

=== Doubles: 14 (7 titles, 7 runner-ups) ===
| Legend ATP Challenger Tour (3–4) ITF Futures/World Tennis Tour (4–3) | Finals by surface Hard (0–1) Clay (7–6) |

| Result | W–L | Date | Tournament | Tier | Surface | Partner | Opponents | Score |
|---|---|---|---|---|---|---|---|---|
| Loss | 0–1 | Nov 2009 | Argentina F22, Bahía Blanca | Futures | Clay | (Argentina) Mariano Benedicti | (Argentina) Alejandro Fabbri (Argentina) Jonathan Gonzalia | 2–6, 2–6 |
| Win | 1–1 | Jul 2010 | Argentina F12, Resistencia | Futures | Clay | (Argentina) Rodrigo Albano | (Argentina) Nicolas Pastor (Argentina) Juan-Manuel Romanazzi | 7–6^{(7–1)}, 6–4 |
| Loss | 1–2 | Mar 2011 | USA F6, Harlingen | Futures | Hard | (Argentina) Juan Pablo Ortiz | (Sweden) Daniel Danilović (United States) Joshua Zavala | 0–6, 4–6 |
| Loss | 1–3 | Aug 2011 | Italy F22, Appiano | Futures | Clay | (Argentina) Andrés Molteni | (Italy) Alessandro Giannessi (Italy) Stefano Ianni | 2–6, 0–6 |
| Win | 2–3 | Apr 2012 | Santos, Brazil | Challenger | Clay | (Argentina) Andrés Molteni | (Brazil) Rogério Dutra da Silva (Brazil) Júlio Silva | 6–4, 6–3 |
| Win | 3–3 | Jul 2012 | Bercuit, Belgium | Challenger | Clay | (Brazil) André Ghem | (Argentina) Facundo Bagnis (Argentina) Pablo Galdón | 6–1, 6–2 |
| Loss | 3–4 | Nov 2012 | Medellín, Colombia | Challenger | Clay | (Argentina) Renzo Olivo | (Germany) Simon Stadler (United States) Nicholas Monroe | 4–6, 4–6 |
| Loss | 3–5 | Jan 2013 | Bucaramanga, Colombia | Challenger | Clay | (Peru) Sergio Galdós | (Brazil) Marcelo Demoliner (Croatia) Franko Škugor | 6–7^{(8–10)}, 2–6 |
| Win | 4–5 | Mar 2013 | Salinas, Ecuador | Challenger | Clay | (Peru) Sergio Galdós | (South Africa) Jean Andersen (South Africa) Izak Van der Merwe | 6–4, 6–4 |
| Win | 5–5 | Jul 2014 | Argentina F10, Buenos Aires | Futures | Clay | (Argentina) Mariano Kestelboim | (Argentina) Valentin Florez (Japan) Ryusei Makiguchi | 6–1, 6–4 |
| Win | 6–5 | Sep 2014 | Ecuador F6, Ibarra | Futures | Clay | (Peru) Sergio Galdós | (Colombia) Juan Carlos Spir (United States) Kevin King | 7–6^{(7–5)}, 7–6^{(7–2)} |
| Loss | 6–6 | May 2015 | Rome, Italy | Challenger | Clay | (Argentina) Andrés Molteni | (Germany) Dustin Brown (Czech Republic) František Čermák | 1–6, 2–6 |
| Win | 7–6 | Oct 2017 | Kazakhstan F7, Shymkent | Futures | Clay | (Spain) Enrique López Pérez | (Ukraine) Vladyslav Manafov (Hungary) Gabor Borsos | 6–2, 6–3 |
| Loss | 7–7 | Jan 2025 | Punta del Este, Uruguay | Challenger | Clay | (Argentina) Facundo Mena | (Brazil) Gustavo Heide (Brazil) João Lucas Reis da Silva | 2–6, 3–6 |

== Wins over top 10 players ==
- Trungelliti's match record against players who were, at the time the match was played, ranked in the top 10.

| # | Player | Rank | Event | Surface | Rd | Score | MT Rank |
|---|---|---|---|---|---|---|---|
2016
| 1. | (Croatia) Marin Čilić | 10 | French Open, Paris, France | Clay | 1R | 7–6^{(7–4)}, 3–6, 6–4, 6–2 | 166 |

== Records ==
=== Open Era records ===
- These records were attained in the Open Era of tennis.
- Records in **bold** indicate peer-less achievements.

| Tournament | Year | Record accomplished | Player |
|---|---|---|---|
| **ATP Tour** | 2026 | | |
| **ATP Tour** | 2026 | Oldest first-time tour-level singles finalist Marrakech | **Stands alone** |
| **ATP Tour** | 2026 | Longest gap (402 weeks) between semifinal appearances on the ATP Tour | tied with Andreas Vinciguerra |
| **ATP Tour** | 2026 | Second-oldest man to debut in Top 100 (36 years, 62 days) | after Torben Ulrich (in 1973 at age 45) |
