= Siddhant Banthia =

Indian tennis player

- Country (sports): India
- Residence: Pune, India
- Born: 4 August 2000 (age 26) Pune, India
- Height: 1.80 m (5 ft 11 in)
- Plays: Right-handed (two-handed backhand)
- College: Wake Forest
- Coach: Jagdish Banthia
- Prize money: US $100,780

Singles
- Career record: 0–0 (at ATP Tour level, Grand Slam level, and in Davis Cup)
- Highest ranking: No. 993 (1 July 2024)
- Current ranking: No. 1,203 (21 September 2026)

Doubles
- Career record: 0–3 (at ATP Tour level, Grand Slam level, and in Davis Cup)
- Career titles: 2 Challenger, 10 ITF
- Highest ranking: No. 115 (21 September 2026)
- Current ranking: No. 115 (21 September 2026)
- Last updated on: 21 September 2026.

Siddhant Banthia (born 4 August 2000) is an Indian tennis player. Banthia has a career high ATP doubles ranking of world No. 115 achieved on 21 September 2026 and a career high singles ranking of No. 993 achieved on 1 July 2024. He is the current No. 4 Indian doubles player.

Banthia played college tennis at Wake Forest University.

== Career ==
Banthia made his ATP main draw debut at the 2021 Winston-Salem Open after receiving a wildcard into the doubles main draw.
