= Rwanda Challenger =

- 2025 Rwanda Challenger

ATP Challenger Tour
- Event name: Rwanda Challenger
- Location: Kigali, Rwanda
- Category: ATP Challenger Tour 100
- Surface: Clay

The Rwanda Challenger is a professional tennis tournament played on clay courts. It is currently part of the ATP Challenger Tour. It was first held in Kigali, Rwanda in 2024.

== Past finals ==
=== Singles ===
Year	Champion	Runner-up	Score
2026 (2)	(Argentina) Marco Trungelliti	(Italy) Marco Cecchinato	4–6, 6–0, 6–3
2026 (1)	(Austria) Joel Schwärzler	(Italy) Stefano Napolitano	7–6^{(7–5)}, 7–6^{(8–6)}
2025 (2)	(France) Valentin Royer	(Netherlands) Guy den Ouden	6–2, 6–4
2025 (1)	(France) Valentin Royer	(Slovakia) Andrej Martin	6–1, 6–2
2024 (2)	(Argentina) Marco Trungelliti	(France) Clément Tabur	6–4, 6–2
2024 (1)	(Poland) Kamil Majchrzak	(Argentina) Marco Trungelliti	6–4, 6–4

=== Doubles ===
Year	Champions	Runners-up	Score
2026 (2)	(Serbia) Stefan Latinović (France) Luka Pavlovic	(India) Siddhant Banthia (Bulgaria) Alexander Donski	7–6^{(7–5)}, 7–6^{(7–2)}
2026 (1)	(United Kingdom) Jay Clarke (Netherlands) Max Houkes	(India) Siddhant Banthia (Bulgaria) Alexander Donski	6–4, 6–7^{(6–8)}, [12–10]
2025 (2)	(India) Siddhant Banthia (Bulgaria) Alexander Donski	(France) Geoffrey Blancaneaux (Czech Republic) Zdeněk Kolář	6–4, 5–7, [10–8]
2025 (1)	(Netherlands) Jesper de Jong (Netherlands) Max Houkes	(France) Geoffrey Blancaneaux (Czech Republic) Zdeněk Kolář	6–3, 7–5
2024 (2)	(Australia) Thomas Fancutt (United States) Hunter Reese	(India) S D Prajwal Dev (Austria) David Pichler	6–1, 7–5
2024 (1)	(Netherlands) Max Houkes (France) Clément Tabur	(Thailand) Pruchya Isaro (Indonesia) Christopher Rungkat	6–3, 7–6^{(7–4)}
