= Luka Pavlovic (tennis) =

French tennis player (born 2000)

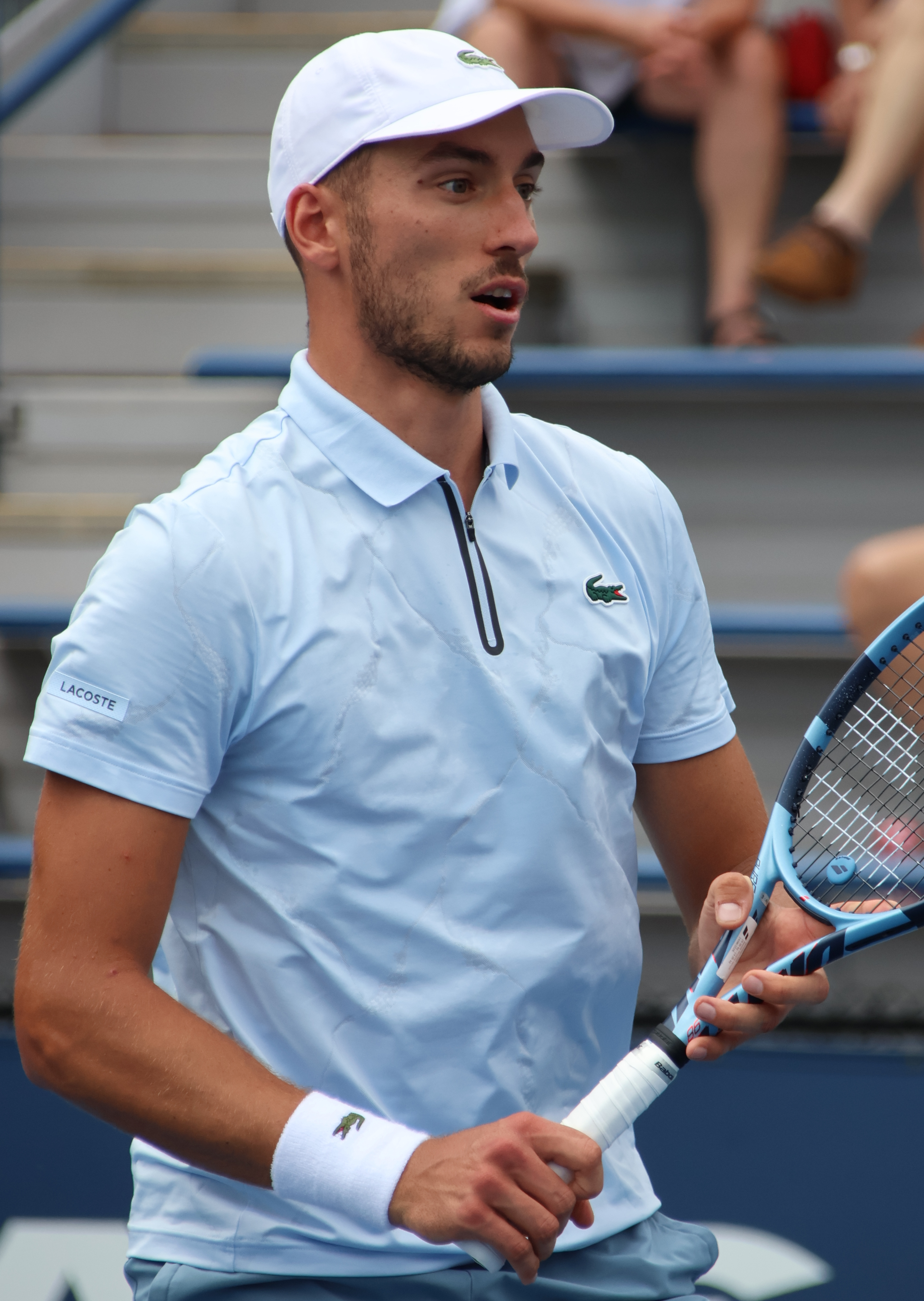
- Pavlovic at the 2026 US Open
- Country (sports): France
- Born: 30 March 2000 (age 26) Stains, France
- Height: 1.96 m (6 ft 5 in)
- Turned pro: 2016
- Plays: Right-handed, Two-handed backhand
- Coach: Ivan Petkovic, Igor Tomasevic
- Prize money: US $519,820

Singles
- Career record: 0–2
- Career titles: 0
- Highest ranking: No. 184 (21 July 2025)
- Current ranking: No. 203 (31 August 2026)

Grand Slam singles results
- Australian Open: Q1 (2026)
- French Open: 1R (2026)
- Wimbledon: Q3 (2025)
- US Open: Q2 (2026)

Doubles
- Career record: 0–0
- Highest ranking: No. 317 (16 March 2026)
- Current ranking: No. 366 (31 August 2026)
- Last updated on: 31 August 2026.

Luka Pavlovic (born 30 March 2000) is a French professional tennis player. He has a career-high ATP singles ranking of world No. 184 achieved on 21 July 2025 and a career-high ATP doubles ranking of world No. 317 achieved on 16 March 2026.

== Career ==
=== 2016: Turned professional ===
Pavlovic turned pro in 2016 on the International Tennis Federation Tour.

=== 2021: First ITF title ===
In September, Pavlovic won his first ITF title in Pirot, Serbia, defeating Cezar Cretu in the final.

=== 2024: First Challenger final ===
In September, Pavlovic reached his first Challenger in Sibiu, losing to fellow countryman and third seed Valentin Royer in the final.

=== 2025: Two Challenger finals, top 200 ===
In April, Pavlovic reached his second final at the Challenger 125 in Mexico City as an alternate, losing to Felipe Meligeni Alves in the final.

In May, Pavlovic made his Grand Slam qualifying debut at the French Open, losing in the first round to Tomás Barrios Vera. In June, Pavlovic participated in the qualifying competition at the 2025 Wimbledon Championships. He defeated Tristan Boyer in the first round, then James Trotter in the second round before ultimately losing to Beibit Zhukayev in the final qualifying round.

In June, Pavlovic reached his third Challenger final at the 2025 Ion Țiriac Challenger, without dropping a set on the way, before losing to Francesco Maestrelli in the final. As a result he reached the top 200 in the singles rankings on 14 July 2025.

=== 2026: ATP & Major debuts, Maiden Challenger titles ===
In February, Pavlovic made his ATP Tour debut as a qualifier at the ABN AMRO Open. He lost to Botic van de Zandschulp in the first round. In March, Pavlovic won his maiden Challenger doubles title in Kigali, pairing with Stefan Latinović.

In May ranked No. 240, Pavlovic made his Grand Slam debut at the 2026 French Open as a qualifier. He lost to 28th seed João Fonseca in the first round.

In July, Pavlovic won his maiden Challenger single final at the Open Castilla y León in Segovia, Spain, defeating compatriot Matteo Martineau in the final.

== Personal life ==
Pavlovic is of Serbian descent.

== Performance timeline ==
Key
W	F	SF	QF	#R	RR	Q#	DNQ	A	NH

(W) winner; (F) finalist; (SF) semifinalist; (QF) quarterfinalist; (#R) rounds 4, 3, 2, 1; (RR) round-robin stage; (Q#) qualification round; (DNQ) did not qualify; (A) absent; (NH) not held; (SR) strike rate (events won / competed); (W–L) win–loss record.

=== Singles ===
Tournament	2025	2026	SR	W–L	Win%
Grand Slam tournaments
Australian Open	A	Q1	0 / 0	0–0	–
French Open	Q1	1R	0 / 1	0–1	0%
Wimbledon	Q3	Q2	0 / 0	0–0	–
US Open	Q1	Q2	0 / 0	0–0	–
Win–loss	0–0	0–1	0 / 1	0–1	0%

== ATP Challenger Tour finals ==
=== Singles: 4 (1 title, 3 runner-ups) ===
Legend ATP Challenger (1–3)	Finals by surface Hard (1–0) Clay (0–3)

Result	W–L	Date	Tournament	Tier	Surface	Opponent	Score
Loss	0–1	Sep 2024	Sibiu Open, Romania	Challenger	Clay	(France) Valentin Royer	4–6, 0–6
Loss	0–2	Apr 2025	Mexico City Open, Mexico	Challenger	Clay	(Brazil) Felipe Meligeni Alves	3–6, 3–6
Loss	0–3	Jun 2025	Ion Țiriac Challenger, Romania	Challenger	Clay	(Italy) Francesco Maestrelli	6–7^{(7–9)}, 4–6
Win	1–3	Jul 2026	Open Castilla y León, Spain	Challenger	Clay	(France) Matteo Martineau	6–4, 3–6, 6–1

=== Doubles: 1 (title) ===
Legend ATP Challenger (1–0)

Result	W–L	Date	Tournament	Tier	Surface	Partner	Opponents	Score
Win	1–0	Mar 2026	Rwanda Challenger II, Rwanda	Challenger	Clay	(Serbia) Stefan Latinović	(India) Siddhant Banthia (Bulgaria) Alexander Donski	7–6^{(7–5)}, 7–6^{(7–2)}

== ITF Tour finals ==
=== Singles: 9 (6 titles, 3 runner-ups) ===
Legend ITF WTT (6–3)	Finals by surface Hard (0–1) Clay (6–2)

Result	W–L	Date	Tournament	Tier	Surface	Opponent	Score
Win	1–0	Sep 2021	M15 Pirot, Serbia	WTT	Clay	(Romania) Cezar Crețu	6–2, 6–2
Loss	1–1	May 2023	M15 Kuršumlijska Banja, Serbia	WTT	Hard	(Poland) Martyn Pawelski	4–6, 1–6
Win	2–1	Aug 2023	M15 Kuršumlijska Banja, Serbia	WTT	Clay	(Serbia) Dušan Obradović	6–2, 6–2
Win	3–1	Sep 2023	M15 Kuršumlijska Banja, Serbia	WTT	Clay	(Bosnia and Herzegovina) Andrej Nedić	7–5, 3–1 ret.
Loss	3–2	Mar 2024	M15 Poreč, Croatia	WTT	Clay	(Austria) Sandro Kopp	3–6, 2–6
Win	4–2	Jun 2024	M25 Kuršumlijska Banja, Serbia	WTT	Clay	(Sweden) Adam Heinonen	6–3, 6–2
Loss	4–3	Jun 2024	M15 Kuršumlijska Banja, Serbia	WTT	Clay	(Montenegro) Petar Jovanović	4–6, 0–2 ret.
Win	5–3	Jul 2024	M15 Kuršumlijska Banja, Serbia	WTT	Clay	(Hungary) Peter Fajta	7–6^{(7–5)}, 6–1
Win	6–3	Jul 2024	M15 Kuršumlijska Banja, Serbia	WTT	Clay	(Serbia) Dušan Obradović	6–3, 6–2
