= Max Houkes =

Dutch tennis player (born 2000)

- Houkes at the 2026 Wimbledon Championships
- Country (sports): Netherlands
- Born: 3 July 2000 (age 26) Emmen, Netherlands
- Height: 1.88 m (6 ft 2 in)
- Plays: Left-handed (two-handed backhand)
- Coach: Colin van Beem, Henrik Håkansson
- Prize money: US $312,797

Singles
- Career record: 0–0
- Career titles: 0 Challenger, 9 Futures
- Highest ranking: No. 205 (19 October 2026)
- Current ranking: No. 215 (26 October 2026)

Grand Slam singles results
- French Open: Q1 (2026)
- Wimbledon: Q1 (2026)

Doubles
- Career record: 0–0
- Career titles: 3 Challenger, 9 Futures
- Highest ranking: No. 313 (26 October 2026)
- Current ranking: No. 313 (26 October 2026)
- Last updated on: 26 October 2026.

Max Houkes (born 3 July 2000) is a Dutch tennis player. He has a career high ATP singles ranking of world No. 205 achieved on 19 October 2026 and a career high doubles ranking of No. 313 achieved on 26 October 2026.

Houkes has won three ATP Challenger doubles titles.

== ATP Challenger and ITF World Tennis Tour finals ==
=== Singles: 23 (15–8) ===
Legend (singles) ATP Challenger Tour (0–0) ITF Futures Tour (15–8)	Titles by surface Hard (1–3) Clay (14–5)

Result	W–L	Date	Tournament	Tier	Surface	Opponent	Score
Loss	0–1	Jul 2022	M15 Innsbruck, Austria	World Tennis Tour	Clay	(Austria) Sandro Kopp	7–5, 1–6, 2–6
Loss	0–2	Jul 2022	M15 Kottingbrunn, Austria	World Tennis Tour	Clay	(Monaco) Valentin Vacherot	3–6, 4–6
Win	1–2	Aug 2022	M25 Oldenzaal, Netherlands	World Tennis Tour	Clay	(Germany) Jeremy Jahn	7–6^{(7–3)}, 6–2
Win	2–2	Sep 2022	M15 Haren, Netherlands	World Tennis Tour	Clay	(Netherlands) Alec Deckers	7–5, 0–3, ret.
Win	3–2	Sep 2022	M15 Casablanca, Morocco	World Tennis Tour	Clay	(Austria) David Pichler	6–4, 6–1
Win	4–2	Sep 2022	M15 Casablanca, Morocco	World Tennis Tour	Clay	(France) Titouan Droguet	6–2, 7–6^{(8–6)}
Win	5–2	Mar 2023	M25 Palmanova, Spain	World Tennis Tour	Clay	(Italy) Stefano Travaglia	4–6, 6–1, 6–2
Win	6–2	Jul 2023	M25 The Hague, Netherlands	World Tennis Tour	Clay	(Netherlands) Guy den Ouden	3–6, 6–3, 6–3
Win	7–2	Jun 2024	M25 Brussels, Belgium	World Tennis Tour	Clay	(Uzbekistan) Khumoyun Sultanov	5–7, 6–1, 6–1
Win	8–2	Jul 2024	M15 Amstelveen, Netherlands	World Tennis Tour	Clay	(Germany) John Sperle	6–3, 3–0 ret.
Win	9–2	Jul 2024	M25 Wetzlar, Germany	World Tennis Tour	Clay	(France) Maxime Chazal	6–4, 7–5
Loss	9–3	Aug 2024	M25 Oldenzaal, Netherlands	World Tennis Tour	Clay	(United States) Toby Kodat	6–3, 2–6, 5–7
Win	10–3	Apr 2025	M25 Santa Margherita di Pula, Italy	World Tennis Tour	Clay	(Switzerland) Dominic Stricker	6–3, 7–5
Loss	10–4	Aug 2025	M25 Überlingen, Germany	World Tennis Tour	Clay	(Germany) Tom Gentzsch	5–7, 4–6
Loss	10–5	Sep 2025	M25 Meerbusch, Germany	World Tennis Tour	Clay	(Belgium) Gilles Arnaud Bailly	4–6, 6–3, 6–7^{(5–7)}
Win	11–5	Oct 2025	M25 Kigali, Rwanda	World Tennis Tour	Clay	(Morocco) Yassine Dlimi	6–3, 3–6, 6–1
Loss	11–6	Nov 2025	M25 Luanda, Angola	World Tennis Tour	Hard	(France) Florent Bax	6–7^{(3–7)}, 3–6
Loss	11–7	Nov 2025	M25 Luanda, Angola	World Tennis Tour	Hard	(Latvia) Robert Strombachs	6–7^{(2–7)}, 6–4, 4–6
Win	12–7	Jan 2026	M25 Chennai, India	World Tennis Tour	Hard	(Netherlands) Niels Visker	6–3, 6–7^{(5–7)}, 6–3
Loss	12–8	Jan 2026	M15 Hyderabad, India	World Tennis Tour	Hard	(India) Karan Singh	4–6, 4–6
Win	13–8	Aug 2026	M25 Casablanca, Morocco	World Tennis Tour	Clay	(Morocco) Karim Bennani	6–7^{(5–7)}, 6–3, 7–6^{(7–4)}
Win	14–8	Sep 2026	M25 Rabat, Morocco	World Tennis Tour	Clay	(Morocco) Walid Ahouda	6–2, 6–4
Win	15–8	Oct 2026	M25 Kigali, Rwanda	World Tennis Tour	Clay	(India) Dev Javia	6–2, 6–7^{(4–7)}, 7–5

=== Doubles 19 (14–5) ===
Legend (doubles) ATP Challenger Tour (5–1) ITF World Tennis Tour (9–4)	Titles by surface Hard (0–0) Clay (14–5)

Result	W–L	Date	Tournament	Tier	Surface	Partner	Opponents	Score
Win	1–0	Jul 2019	M15 Tabarka, Tunisia	World Tennis Tour	Clay	(Netherlands) Maikel Borg	(Argentina) Nicolas Alberto Arreche (Italy) Alexander Weis	6–4, 6–7^{(4–7)}, [12–10]
Win	2–0	Aug 2019	M15 Lambermont, Belgium	World Tennis Tour	Clay	(Netherlands) Colin Van Beem	(France) Dan Added (Belgium) Arnaud Bovy	7–5, 6–3
Loss	2–1	Feb 2020	M15 Antalya, Turkey	World Tennis Tour	Clay	(Spain) David Jordà Sanchis	(Poland) Daniel Michalski (Czech Republic) Michael Vrbenský	1–6, 6–2, [10–12]
Win	3–1	Aug 2020	M15 Alkmaar, Netherlands	World Tennis Tour	Clay	(Netherlands) Sidané Pontjodikromo	(Netherlands) Mats Hermans (Netherlands) Sem Verbeek	6–1, 5–7, [10–8]
Loss	3–2	Sep 2020	M15 Melilla, Spain	World Tennis Tour	Clay	(Spain) José Francisco Vidal Azorín	(France) Valentin Royer (Denmark) Holger Rune	5–7, 3–6
Win	4–2	Dec 2020	M15 Cairo, Egypt	World Tennis Tour	Clay	(Netherlands) Ryan Nijboer	(Egypt) Akram El Sallaly (Egypt) Adham Gaber	6–4, 6–4
Win	5–2	Feb 2021	M15 Antalya, Turkey	World Tennis Tour	Clay	(Netherlands) Sidané Pontjodikromo	(South Korea) Chung Yun-seong (Ukraine) Oleksandr Ovcharenko	7–5, 6–1
Loss	5–3	Jun 2021	M15 Skopje, North Macedonia	World Tennis Tour	Clay	(Netherlands) Sidané Pontjodikromo	(United States) Martin Damm (Czech Republic) Robin Staněk	2–6, 6–7^{(5–7)}
Win	6–3	Sep 2021	M15 Ulcinj, Montenegro	World Tennis Tour	Clay	(Ukraine) Marat Deviatiarov	(Italy) Andrea Basso (Italy) Gianmarco Ferrari	7–5, 6–1
Win	7–3	Oct 2021	M15 Platja d'Aro, Spain	World Tennis Tour	Clay	(Netherlands) Niels Visker	(Argentina) Alex Barrena (Spain) Carlos López Montagud	4–6, 6–4, [10–6]
Win	8–3	Oct 2022	Lima, Peru	Challenger	Clay	(Netherlands) Jesper de Jong	(Argentina) Guido Andreozzi (Argentina) Guillermo Durán	7–6^{(6–8)}, 3–6, [12–10]
Win	9–3	Mar 2023	M25 Palmanova, Spain	World Tennis Tour	Clay	(Netherlands) Jesper de Jong	(Romania) Alexandru Jecan (Germany) Kai Wehnelt	6–3, 6–4
Loss	9–4	Sep 2023	M25 Pazardzhik, Bulgaria	World Tennis Tour	Clay	(Ukraine) Eric Vanshelboim	(Austria) Sandro Kopp (Austria) Neil Oberleitner	0–6, 0–6
Win	10–4	Oct 2023	M25 Santa Margherita di Pula, Italy	World Tennis Tour	Clay	(Netherlands) Thiemo de Bakker	(Italy) Gianmarco Ferrari (Italy) Marcello Serafini	W/O
Loss	10–5	Jan 2024	Buenos Aires, Argentina	Challenger	Clay	(Austria) Lukas Neumayer	(Peru) Arklon Huertas del Pino (Peru) Conner Huertas del Pino	3–6, 6–3, [6–10]
Win	11–5	Mar 2024	Kigali, Rwanda	Challenger	Clay	(France) Clément Tabur	(Thailand) Pruchya Isaro (Indonesia) Christopher Rungkat	6–3, 7–6 ^{(7–4)}
Win	12–5	Mar 2025	Kigali, Rwanda	Challenger	Clay	(Netherlands) Jesper de Jong	(France) Geoffrey Blancaneaux (Czech Republic) Zdeněk Kolář	6–3, 7–5
Win	13–5	Mar 2026	Kigali, Rwanda	Challenger	Clay	(United Kingdom) Jay Clarke	(India) Siddhant Banthia (Bulgaria) Alexander Donski	6–4, 6–7^{(6–8)}, [12–10]
Win	14–5	Oct 2026	Florence, Italy	Challenger	Clay	(Netherlands) Mats Hermans	(India) Jacopo Bilardo (Italy) Giorgio Ricca	7–5, 4–6, [10–8].
