= Nicholas David Ionel =

Romanian tennis player (born 2002)

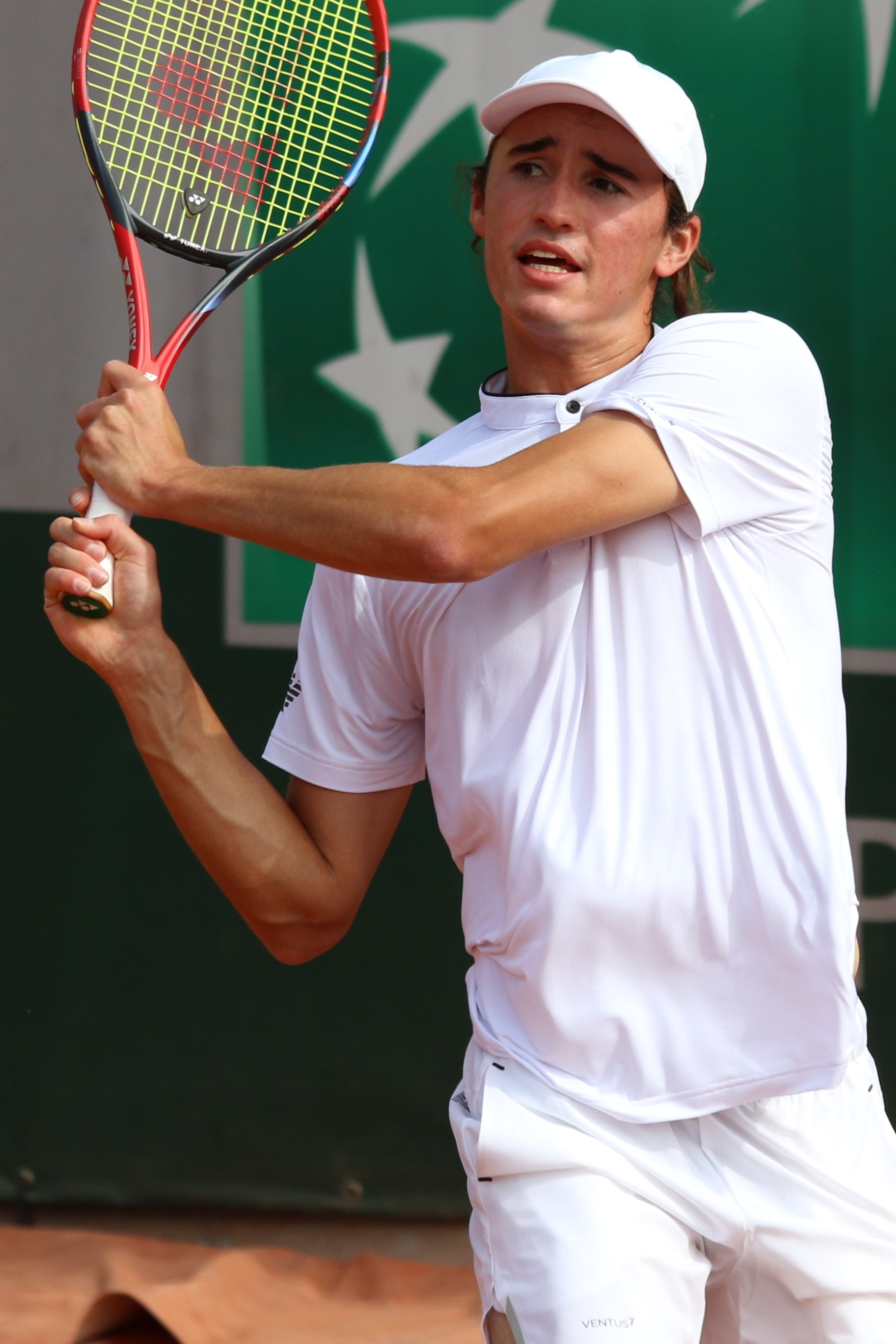
- Ionel at the 2023 French Open
- Full name: Nicholas David Ionel
- Country (sports): Romania
- Residence: Bucharest, Romania
- Born: 12 October 2002 (age 24) Bucharest, Romania
- Height: 1.83 m (6 ft 0 in)
- Plays: Right-handed (two-handed backhand)
- Coach: Andrei Pavel
- Prize money: $277,760

Singles
- Career record: 2–4 (at ATP Tour level, Grand Slam level, and in Davis Cup)
- Career titles: 0
- Highest ranking: No. 184 (12 June 2023)
- Current ranking: No. 805 (20 July 2026)

Grand Slam singles results
- Australian Open: Q1 (2023)
- French Open: Q1 (2023)
- Wimbledon: Q1 (2023)
- US Open: Q1 (2023)

Doubles
- Career record: 0–0 (at ATP Tour level, Grand Slam level, and in Davis Cup)
- Career titles: 0
- Highest ranking: No. 356 (24 April 2023)
- Current ranking: No. 1,791 (20 July 2026)

Grand Slam doubles results
- Australian Open Junior: W (2020)
- Last updated on: 20 July 2026.

Nicholas David Ionel (born 12 October 2002) is a Romanian professional tennis player. He has a career high ATP singles ranking of No. 184 achieved on 12 June 2023 and a career high ATP doubles ranking of No. 356 achieved on 24 April 2023. He is currently the No. 4 Romanian player. Ionel won the 2020 Australian Open Junior doubles title with Leandro Riedi.

== Career ==
=== 2020: ATP qualification debut ===
Ionel was awarded with a qualification wildcard to play his first ATP tournament at the 2020 European Open, where he pushed former world No. 36 Yūichi Sugita to three sets.

=== 2022: Top 250 debut ===
He reached the top 250 in singles on 7 November 2022 at No. 241.

== Personal life ==
He trains at the Mouratoglou Tennis Academy in Sophia Antipolis since 2018.

== Junior Grand Slam titles ==
=== Doubles: 1 (1 title) ===
Result	Year	Tournament	Surface	Partner	Opponents	Score
Winner	2020	(Australia) Australian Open	Hard	(Switzerland) Leandro Riedi	(Poland) Mikołaj Lorens (Latvia) Kārlis Ozoliņš	6–7^{(8–10)}, 7–5, [10–4]

== ITF World Tennis Tour and ATP Challenger finals ==
=== Singles: 21 (14-7) ===
Legend (singles) ATP Challenger Tour (0–0) ITF World Tennis Tour (14-7)	Titles by surface Hard (3–1) Clay (11–6) Grass (0–0) Carpet (0–0)

Result	W–L	Date	Tournament	Tier	Surface	Opponent	Score
Win	1–0	Sep 2019	M15 Brașov, Romania	World Tennis Tour	Clay	(Ukraine) Oleksii Krutykh	7–5, 6–4
Win	2–0	Sep 2019	M15 Târgu Mureș, Romania	World Tennis Tour	Clay	(Argentina) Juan Ignacio Galarza	6–7^{(1–7)}, 7–5, 6–4
Win	3–0	Oct 2019	M15 Tabarka, Tunisia	World Tennis Tour	Clay	(Argentina) Manuel Pena Lopez	6–4, 7–5
Win	4–0	Nov 2019	M15 Tabarka, Tunisia	World Tennis Tour	Clay	(Italy) Andrea Picchione	6–4, 4–6, 6–4
Win	5–0	Feb 2020	M15 Heraklion, Greece	World Tennis Tour	Hard	(Brazil) Jordan Correia	6–4, 4–6, 6–4
Loss	5–1	Jul 2021	M15 Esch-sur-Alzette, Luxembourg	World Tennis Tour	Clay	(United States) Patrick Kypson	6–4, 3–6, 5–7
Loss	5–2	Oct 2021	M15 Antalya, Turkey	World Tennis Tour	Clay	(Poland) Daniel Michalski	3-6, 4-6
Loss	5–3	Nov 2021	M15 Heraklion, Greece	World Tennis Tour	Hard	(United Kingdom) Jack Pinnington Jones	6–7^{(3–7)}, 1–6
Win	6-3	Feb 2022	M15 Sharm El Sheikh, Egypt	World Tennis Tour	Hard	(Italy) Matteo Gigante	6–3, 4–6, 6–1
Win	7-3	Mar 2022	M15 Marrakesh, Morocco	World Tennis Tour	Clay	(France) Alexis Musialek	6–3, 6-2
Loss	7-4	Mar 2022	M15 Marrakesh, Morocco	World Tennis Tour	Clay	(Italy) Edoardo Lavagno	4-6, 2-6
Win	8-4	Aug 2022	M25 Pitești, Romania	World Tennis Tour	Clay	(Argentina) Juan Pablo Paz	6-3, 3-6, 6-4
Loss	8-5	Aug 2022	M15 Craiova, Romania	World Tennis Tour	Clay	(Romania) Cesar Crețu	2-6, 6-2, 2-6
Win	9-5	Oct 2022	M25 Gaziantep, Turkey	World Tennis Tour	Clay	(France) Corentin Denolly	6-2, 6-2
Win	10-5	Jan 2023	M15 Jakarta, Indonesia	World Tennis Tour	Hard	(India) Sidharth Rawat	4-6, 6-1, 7-6^{(11–9)}
Win	11-5	May 2023	M15 Alaminos-Larnaca, Cyprus	World Tennis Tour	Clay	(Romania) Filip Cristian Jianu	6-3, 7-6^{(7–2)}
Loss	11-6	Oct 2023	M25 Pazardzhik, Bulgaria	World Tennis Tour	Clay	(Czech Republic) Martin Krumich	6-4, 0-6, 4-6
Loss	11-7	Oct 2023	M25 Telavi, Georgia	World Tennis Tour	Clay	(Czech Republic) Martin Krumich	4-6, 4-6
Win	12-7	Jan 2024	M15 Antalya, Turkey	World Tennis Tour	Clay	(Romania) Cezar Cretu	6-1, 6-1
Win	13-7	Sep 2024	M15 Constanta, Romania	World Tennis Tour	Clay	(Canada) Liam Draxl	6-3, 6-4
Win	14-7	Sep 2024	M15 Târgu Mureș, Romania	World Tennis Tour	Clay	(Brazil) João Eduardo Schiessl	6-0, 4-6, 6-3

=== Doubles: 3 (1–2) ===
Legend (doubles) ATP Challenger Tour (0–0) ITF World Tennis Tour (1–2)	Titles by surface Hard (0–0) Clay (1–2) Grass (0–0) Carpet (0–0)

Result	W–L	Date	Tournament	Tier	Surface	Partner	Opponents	Score
Loss	0–1	Aug 2018	Romania F10, Curtea de Argeș	Futures	Clay	(Romania) Nicolae Frunză	(Romania) Vasile Antonescu (Romania) Alexandru Jecan	1–6, 3–6
Loss	0–2	Oct 2019	M15 Tabarka, Tunisia	World Tennis Tour	Clay	(Romania) Petru-Alexandru Luncanu	(Argentina) Nicolas Alberto Arreche (Argentina) Franco Feitt	6–2, 5–7, [6–10]
Win	1–2	Oct 2019	M15 Tabarka, Tunisia	World Tennis Tour	Clay	(Romania) Petru-Alexandru Luncanu	(Italy) Gianmarco Ferrari (Italy) Niccolo Inserra	W/O
