= 2020 Sibiu Open – Doubles =

Doubles
- 2020 Sibiu Open

Final
- Champions: (United States) Hunter Reese (Poland) Jan Zieliński
- Runners-up: (United States) Robert Galloway (Mexico) Hans Hach Verdugo
- Score: 6–4, 6–2

Events
Singles	Doubles
← 2019 ·	Sibiu Open	· 2021 →

Sadio Doumbia and Fabien Reboul were the defending champions but chose not to defend their title.

Hunter Reese and Jan Zieliński won the title after defeating Robert Galloway and Hans Hach Verdugo 6–4, 6–2 in the final.

== Seeds ==
1. (Venezuela) Luis David Martínez / (Mexico) Miguel Ángel Reyes-Varela (quarterfinals)
2. (Brazil) Felipe Meligeni Alves / (Brazil) Fernando Romboli (semifinals)
3. (Philippines) Treat Huey / (United States) Nathaniel Lammons (first round)
4. (Germany) Andre Begemann / (Romania) Florin Mergea (quarterfinals)

== Draw ==
=== Key ===
- Q = Qualifier
- WC = Wild card
- LL = Lucky loser
- Alt = Alternate
- SE = Special exempt
- PR = Protected ranking
- ITF = ITF entry
- JE = Junior exempt
- w/o = Walkover
- r = Retired
- d = Defaulted
- SR = Special ranking

First round
1	(Venezuela) LD Martínez (Mexico) MÁ Reyes-Varela	6	6
WC	(Romania) D Dima (Turkey) E Kırkın	3	2
(Brazil) O Luz (Brazil) R Matos	4	3
(Sweden) A Göransson (Switzerland) M-A Hüsler	6	6
3	(Philippines) T Huey (United States) N Lammons	6	6^{2}	[7]
(United States) R Galloway (Mexico) H Hach Verdugo	2	7^{7}	[10]
(United States) A Lawson (Poland) K Żuk	5	6	[9]
Alt	(Argentina) F Cerúndolo (Argentina) TM Etcheverry	7	3	[11]
(United States) H Reese (Poland) J Zieliński	6	6
WC	(Romania) Tudor Ștefan Gheorghiță (Romania) DN Mădăraș	4	1
PR	(Spain) Í Cervantes (Spain) O Roca Batalla	1	2
4	(Germany) A Begemann (Romania) F Mergea	6	6
WC	(Romania) VV Cornea (Romania) A Jecan	4	2
(Spain) A Menéndez Maceiras (Austria) L Miedler	6	6
(Zimbabwe) B Lock (Spain) R Ortega Olmedo	6^{0}	3
2	(Brazil) F Meligeni Alves (Brazil) F Romboli	7^{7}	6

Quarterfinals
1	(Venezuela) LD Martínez (Mexico) MÁ Reyes-Varela	3	6^{4}
(Sweden) A Göransson (Switzerland) M-A Hüsler	6	7^{7}
(United States) R Galloway (Mexico) H Hach Verdugo	6	6
Alt	(Argentina) F Cerúndolo (Argentina) TM Etcheverry	0	4
(United States) H Reese (Poland) J Zieliński	6	6
4	(Germany) A Begemann (Romania) F Mergea	4	4
(Spain) A Menéndez Maceiras (Austria) L Miedler	6^{3}	5
2	(Brazil) F Meligeni Alves (Brazil) F Romboli	7^{7}	7

Semifinals
(Sweden) A Göransson (Switzerland) M-A Hüsler	6^{3}	6	[6]
(United States) R Galloway (Mexico) H Hach Verdugo	7^{7}	3	[10]
(United States) H Reese (Poland) J Zieliński	6	7
2	(Brazil) F Meligeni Alves (Brazil) F Romboli	3	5

Final
(United States) R Galloway (Mexico) H Hach Verdugo	4	2
(United States) H Reese (Poland) J Zieliński	6	6
