= 2019 Sibiu Open – Singles =

Singles
- 2019 Sibiu Open

Final
- Champion: (Serbia) Danilo Petrović
- Runner-up: (Australia) Christopher O'Connell
- Score: 6–4, 6–2

Events
Singles	Doubles
← 2018 ·	Sibiu Open	· 2020 →

Dragoș Dima was the defending champion but lost in the first round to Václav Šafránek.

Danilo Petrović won the title after defeating Christopher O'Connell 6–4, 6–2 in the final.

== Seeds ==
All seeds receive a bye into the second round.

1. (Portugal) Pedro Sousa (third round)
2. (Slovenia) Blaž Rola (quarterfinals)
3. (Hungary) Attila Balázs (withdrew)
4. (Spain) Pedro Martínez (second round)
5. (Serbia) Nikola Milojević (second round)
6. (Argentina) Federico Coria (third round)
7. (Netherlands) Robin Haase (second round)
8. (Germany) Rudolf Molleker (second round)
9. (Portugal) João Domingues (second round)
10. (Argentina) Facundo Argüello (second round)
11. (Netherlands) Tallon Griekspoor (second round)
12. (Slovakia) Filip Horanský (second round)
13. (Kazakhstan) Dmitry Popko (second round)
14. (Australia) Christopher O'Connell (final)
15. (Serbia) Peđa Krstin (third round)
16. (Spain) Bernabé Zapata Miralles (second round)

== Draw ==
=== Key ===
- Q = Qualifier
- WC = Wild card
- LL = Lucky loser
- Alt = Alternate
- SE = Special exempt
- PR = Protected ranking
- ITF = ITF entry
- JE = Junior exempt
- w/o = Walkover
- r = Retired
- d = Defaulted
- SR = Special ranking

=== Finals ===
Quarterfinals
14	(Australia) Christopher O'Connell	7	6
(Czech Republic) Vít Kopřiva	5	3
(Netherlands) Jelle Sels	6	6
(Czech Republic) Václav Šafránek	2	2
(Serbia) Danilo Petrović	6	7^{7}
(France) Laurent Lokoli	4	6^{3}
(Slovakia) Alex Molčan	6	6^{4}	6
2	(Slovenia) Blaž Rola	4	7^{7}	4

Semifinals
14	(Australia) Christopher O'Connell	4	6	6
(Netherlands) Jelle Sels	6	4	2
(Serbia) Danilo Petrović	6	6
(Slovakia) Alex Molčan	3	3

Final
14	(Australia) Christopher O'Connell	4	2
(Serbia) Danilo Petrović	6	6

=== Top half ===
==== Section 1 ====
First round
Alt	(Czech Republic) Pavel Nejedlý	6	3	3
Alt	(Czech Republic) P Nouza	3	6	6
(Czech Republic) A Pavlásek	3	4
(France) M Hamou	6	6
(Czech Republic) V Kopřiva	6	7^{7}
(Germany) P Torebko	2	6^{4}
(Spain) J Barranco Cosano	3	6	7
(Italy) Fabrizio Ornago	6	3	5

Second round
1	(Portugal) P Sousa	6	6
Alt	(Czech Republic) P Nouza	3	1
(France) M Hamou	7^{7}	6^{4}	2
14	(Australia) C O'Connell	6^{3}	7^{7}	6
10	(Argentina) F Argüello	5	1
(Czech Republic) V Kopřiva	7	6
(Spain) J Barranco Cosano	1	2
6	(Argentina) F Coria	6	6

Third round
1	(Portugal) P Sousa	4	1
14	(Australia) C O'Connell	6	6
(Czech Republic) V Kopřiva	5	6	7
6	(Argentina) F Coria	7	2	5

Quarterfinals
14	(Australia) C O'Connell	7	6
(Czech Republic) V Kopřiva	5	3

==== Section 2 ====
First round
(Netherlands) J Sels	7	6
Q	(Czech Republic) J Pospíšil	5	3
(France) S Doumbia	4	2
(Czech Republic) Z Kolář	6	6
(Estonia) J Zopp	2	6^{3}
(Croatia) N Serdarušić	6	7^{7}
(Romania) D Dima	2	4
(Czech Republic) V Šafránek	6	6

Second round
4	(Spain) P Martínez	4	2
(Netherlands) J Sels	6	6
(Czech Republic) Z Kolář	6	6
13	(Kazakhstan) D Popko	1	2
11	(Netherlands) T Griekspoor	3	4
(Croatia) N Serdarušić	6	6
(Czech Republic) V Šafránek	6	6
8	(Germany) R Molleker	3	4

Third round
(Netherlands) J Sels	6	6
(Czech Republic) Z Kolář	4	4
(Croatia) N Serdarušić	1	2
(Czech Republic) V Šafránek	6	6

Quarterfinals
(Netherlands) J Sels	6	6
(Czech Republic) V Šafránek	2	2

=== Bottom half ===
==== Section 3 ====
First round
(Belarus) U Ignatik	6^{7}	4
(Serbia) D Petrović	7^{9}	6
(France) Jules Okala	1	3
(Peru) JP Varillas	6	6
(Spain) P Toledo Bagué	2	1
(Spain) N Sánchez Izquierdo	6	6
WC	(Switzerland) A Bodmer	5	3
(France) L Lokoli	7	6

Second round
7	(Netherlands) R Haase	3	2
(Serbia) D Petrović	6	6
(Peru) JP Varillas	6	6
9	(Portugal) J Domingues	3	3
16	(Spain) B Zapata Miralles	2	4
(Spain) N Sánchez Izquierdo	6	6
(France) L Lokoli	6	6
LL	(Spain) S Martos Gornés	1	2

Third round
(Serbia) D Petrović	7^{7}	6
(Peru) JP Varillas	6^{4}	3
(Spain) N Sánchez Izquierdo	4	5
(France) L Lokoli	6	7

Quarterfinals
(Serbia) D Petrović	6	7^{7}
(France) L Lokoli	4	6^{3}

==== Section 4 ====
First round
(Slovakia) A Molčan	6	7^{7}
WC	(Romania) VV Cornea	1	6^{5}
Q	(Croatia) M Sabanov	4	2
WC	(Romania) FC Jianu	6	6
WC	(Romania) A Jecan	6	4	3
WC	(Poland) Michał Dembek	2	6	6
(Spain) C Taberner	6	4	2
Alt	(France) F Reboul	0	6	6

Second round
5	(Serbia) N Milojević	7	1	3
(Slovakia) A Molčan	5	6	6
WC	(Romania) FC Jianu	7^{7}	6
12	(Slovakia) F Horanský	6^{3}	3
15	(Serbia) P Krstin	6	6
WC	(Poland) M Dembek	4	2
Alt	(France) F Reboul	3	6	3
2	(Slovenia) B Rola	6	4	6

Third round
(Slovakia) A Molčan	2	6	7^{7}
WC	(Romania) FC Jianu	6	4	6^{4}
15	(Serbia) P Krstin	1	6	1
2	(Slovenia) B Rola	6	3	6

Quarterfinals
(Slovakia) A Molčan	6	6^{4}	6
2	(Slovenia) B Rola	4	7^{7}	4
