= 2016 Sibiu Open – Singles =

Singles
- 2016 Sibiu Open

Final
- Champion: (Netherlands) Robin Haase
- Runner-up: (Italy) Lorenzo Giustino
- Score: 7–6^{(7–2)}, 6–2

Events
Singles	Doubles
← 2015 ·	Sibiu Open	· 2017 →

Adrian Ungur was the defending champion but lost in the quarterfinals to Tim Pütz.

Robin Haase won the title after defeating Lorenzo Giustino 7–6^{(7–2)}, 6–2 in the final.

== Seeds ==
1. (Netherlands) Robin Haase (champion)
2. (Austria) Gerald Melzer (first round)
3. (Hungary) Márton Fucsovics (first round, retired)
4. (Italy) Federico Gaio (second round)
5. (Czech Republic) Jan Šátral (quarterfinals)
6. (Serbia) Peđa Krstin (first round)
7. (Serbia) Miljan Zekić (first round)
8. (Romania) Adrian Ungur (quarterfinals)

== Draw ==
=== Key ===
- Q = Qualifier
- WC = Wild card
- LL = Lucky loser
- Alt = Alternate
- SE = Special exempt
- PR = Protected ranking
- ITF = ITF entry
- JE = Junior exempt
- w/o = Walkover
- r = Retired
- d = Defaulted
- SR = Special ranking

=== Finals ===
Semifinals
1	(Netherlands) Robin Haase	3	6	7^{7}
PR	(Germany) Tim Pütz	6	1	6^{2}
(Italy) Lorenzo Giustino	6^{0}	6	7
Q	(Australia) Christopher O'Connell	7^{7}	4	5

Final
1	(Netherlands) Robin Haase	7^{7}	6
(Italy) Lorenzo Giustino	6^{2}	2

=== Top half ===
First round
1	(Netherlands) R Haase	6	6
(France) A Michon	2	4
WC	(Romania) V-M Anagnastopol	5	2
(Croatia) N Mektić	7	6
(Germany) Y Maden	2	6	6
(Italy) R Bellotti	6	2	2
(Austria) D Novak	6	6
6	(Serbia) P Krstin	3	3
4	(Italy) F Gaio	6	6
(Bulgaria) D Kuzmanov	4	2
PR	(Germany) T Pütz	6	6
(Italy) G Mager	4	2
WC	(Romania) B Borza	6	1	6
Q	(Germany) A Mies	2	6	3
(France) J Eysseric	6^{3}	3
8	(Romania) A Ungur	7^{7}	6

Second round
1	(Netherlands) R Haase	6	2	6
(Croatia) N Mektić	4	6	0
(Germany) Y Maden	6	4	3
(Austria) D Novak	2	6	6
4	(Italy) F Gaio	6^{5}	6	1
PR	(Germany) T Pütz	7^{7}	2	6
WC	(Romania) B Borza	1	3
8	(Romania) A Ungur	6	6

Quarterfinals
1	(Netherlands) R Haase	7	6
(Austria) D Novak	5	2
PR	(Germany) T Pütz	7^{7}	7
8	(Romania) A Ungur	6^{4}	5

Semifinals
1	(Netherlands) R Haase	3	6	7^{7}
PR	(Germany) T Pütz	6	1	6^{2}

=== Bottom half ===
First round
5	(Czech Republic) J Šátral	6	6
Q	(Austria) Lenny Hampel	2	3
WC	(Romania) VV Cornea	1	1
Q	(Germany) Jonas Lütjen	6	6
(Romania) D Dima	6	6^{6}	1
(Italy) L Giustino	4	7^{8}	6
(Poland) K Majchrzak	7	4
3	(Hungary) M Fucsovics	5	1^{r}
7	(Serbia) M Zekić	4	6	5
WC	(Poland) Michał Dembek	6	3	7
Alt	(Serbia) D Petrović	2	6^{4}
(Czech Republic) V Šafránek	6	7^{7}
(Czech Republic) Z Kolář	4	6	3
(France) T Lamasine	6	1	6
Q	(Australia) C O'Connell	6	6
2	(Austria) G Melzer	4	4

Second round
5	(Czech Republic) J Šátral	6	5	6
Q	(Germany) J Lütjen	1	7	2
(Italy) L Giustino	6	1
(Poland) K Majchrzak	3	0^{r}
WC	(Poland) M Dembek	6	3	2
(Czech Republic) V Šafránek	3	6	6
(France) T Lamasine	1	2
Q	(Australia) C O'Connell	6	6

Quarterfinals
5	(Czech Republic) J Šátral	4	6	3
(Italy) L Giustino	6	3	6
(Czech Republic) V Šafránek	7^{7}	1	1
Q	(Australia) C O'Connell	6^{5}	6	6

Semifinals
(Italy) L Giustino	6^{0}	6	7
Q	(Australia) C O'Connell	7^{7}	4	5
