= 2023 Sibiu Open – Singles =

Singles
- 2023 Sibiu Open

Final
- Champion: (Bosnia and Herzegovina) Nerman Fatić
- Runner-up: (Bosnia and Herzegovina) Damir Džumhur
- Score: 6–2, 6–4

Events
Singles	Doubles
← 2022 ·	Sibiu Open	· 2024 →

Nerman Fatić was the defending champion and successfully defended his title after defeating Damir Džumhur 6–2, 6–4 in the final.

== Seeds ==
1. (Hungary) Zsombor Piros (semifinals)
2. (Italy) Flavio Cobolli (semifinals)
3. (Bosnia and Herzegovina) Damir Džumhur (final)
4. Ivan Gakhov (quarterfinals)
5. (Italy) Stefano Travaglia (quarterfinals)
6. (Croatia) Duje Ajduković (quarterfinals)
7. (Italy) Alessandro Giannessi (first round, retired)
8. (Bosnia and Herzegovina) Nerman Fatić (champion)

== Draw ==
=== Key ===
- Q = Qualifier
- WC = Wild card
- LL = Lucky loser
- Alt = Alternate
- SE = Special exempt
- PR = Protected ranking
- ITF = ITF entry
- JE = Junior exempt
- w/o = Walkover
- r = Retired
- d = Defaulted
- SR = Special ranking

=== Finals ===
Semifinals
1	(Hungary) Zsombor Piros	2	6	1
8	(Bosnia and Herzegovina) Nerman Fatić	6	1	6
3	(Bosnia and Herzegovina) Damir Džumhur	7	6
2	(Italy) Flavio Cobolli	5	4

Final
8	(Bosnia and Herzegovina) Nerman Fatić	6	6
3	(Bosnia and Herzegovina) Damir Džumhur	2	4

=== Top half ===
First round
1	(Hungary) Z Piros	6	6
(Spain) N Sánchez Izquierdo	3	3
Q	(Czech Republic) A Paulson	6	6
(Croatia) N Serdarušić	2	1
Q	(France) C Hemery	6	6
(Hungary) M Valkusz	1	1
WC	(Slovenia) B Artnak	3
7	(Italy) A Giannessi	0^{r}
4	I Gakhov	6	4	7
(France) C Tabur	1	6	5
(Italy) Alexander Weis	6	4	6
Q	(Czech Republic) M Vrbenský	4	6	2
(Canada) S Diez	2	5
(Italy) R Bonadio	6	7
Q	(Romania) Vlad Andrei Dancu	4	4
8	(Bosnia and Herzegovina) N Fatić	6	6

Second round
1	(Hungary) Z Piros	6	6
Q	(Czech Republic) A Paulson	3	4
Q	(France) C Hemery	6	6
WC	(Slovenia) B Artnak	4	2
4	I Gakhov	7^{7}	6^{1}	7^{7}
(Italy) A Weis	6^{5}	7^{7}	6^{5}
(Italy) R Bonadio	7	6^{7}	4
8	(Bosnia and Herzegovina) N Fatić	5	7^{9}	6

Quarterfinals
1	(Hungary) Z Piros	6	4	6
Q	(France) C Hemery	3	6	1
4	I Gakhov	1	6	2
8	(Bosnia and Herzegovina) N Fatić	6	2	6

Semifinals
1	(Hungary) Z Piros	2	6	1
8	(Bosnia and Herzegovina) N Fatić	6	1	6

=== Bottom half ===
First round
5	(Italy) S Travaglia	7^{7}	6
WC	(Romania) Sebastian Gima	6^{2}	3
(Spain) C Taberner	6^{4}	2
(France) G Blancaneaux	7^{7}	6
Q	(Switzerland) H Laaksonen	6	0	2
(Tunisia) M Echargui	2	6	6
(Romania) ND Ionel	3	6^{2}
3	(Bosnia and Herzegovina) D Džumhur	6	7^{7}
6	(Croatia) D Ajduković	3	6	6
(Italy) F Maestrelli	6	3	4
(Italy) G Fonio	7^{7}	6
WC	(Romania) C Crețu	6^{1}	3
Q	(Romania) FC Jianu	6^{4}	4
(Italy) Edoardo Lavagno	7^{7}	6
(Italy) S Caruso	7^{7}	4	4
2	(Italy) F Cobolli	6^{5}	6	6

Second round
5	(Italy) S Travaglia	7	6
(France) G Blancaneaux	5	3
(Tunisia) M Echargui	4	1
3	(Bosnia and Herzegovina) D Džumhur	6	6
6	(Croatia) D Ajduković	4	6	6
(Italy) G Fonio	6	3	2
(Italy) E Lavagno	5	2
2	(Italy) F Cobolli	7	6

Quarterfinals
5	(Italy) S Travaglia	4	4
3	(Bosnia and Herzegovina) D Džumhur	6	6
6	(Croatia) D Ajduković	2	3
2	(Italy) F Cobolli	6	6

Semifinals
3	(Bosnia and Herzegovina) D Džumhur	7	6
2	(Italy) F Cobolli	5	4
