= 2015 Sibiu Open =

- Date: 21–27 September
- Edition: 4th
- Location: Sibiu, Romania

Champions

Singles
- (Romania) Adrian Ungur

Doubles
- (Romania) Victor Crivoi / (Romania) Petru-Alexandru Luncanu
← 2014 ·	Sibiu Open	· 2016 →

The 2015 Sibiu Open was a professional tennis tournament played on clay courts. It was the fourth edition of the tournament which was part of the 2015 ATP Challenger Tour. It took place in Sibiu, Romania between 21 and 27 September 2015.

== Singles main-draw entrants ==
=== Seeds ===
Country	Player	Rank^{1}	Seed
SRB	Dušan Lajović	102	1
GER	Tobias Kamke	172	2
SRB	Laslo Djere	177	3
BEL	Germain Gigounon	185	4
ITA	Gianluca Naso	187	5
FRA	Calvin Hemery	205	6
FRA	Tristan Lamasine	212	7
CZE	Jan Mertl	213	8

- ^{1} Rankings are as of September 14, 2015.

=== Other entrants ===
The following players received wildcards into the singles main draw:

- (Romania) Victor Vlad Cornea
- (Romania) Victor Crivoi
- (Poland) Michał Dembek
- (Romania) Dragoș Dima

The following players received entry from the qualifying draw:

- (Canada) Steven Diez
- (Spain) Marc Giner
- (Romania) Petru-Alexandru Luncanu
- (Italy) Riccardo Sinicropi

The following player received entry as a lucky loser:

- (Romania) Andrei Stefan Apostol

== Champions ==
=== Singles ===
- (Romania) Adrian Ungur def. (Spain) Pere Riba, 6–4, 3–6, 7–5

=== Doubles ===
- (Romania) Victor Crivoi / (Romania) Petru-Alexandru Luncanu def. (Serbia) Ilija Bozoljac / (Serbia) Dušan Lajović, 6–4, 6–3
