= 2019 Sibiu Open – Doubles =

Doubles
- 2019 Sibiu Open

Final
- Champions: (France) Sadio Doumbia (France) Fabien Reboul
- Runners-up: (Croatia) Ivan Sabanov (Croatia) Matej Sabanov
- Score: 6–4, 3–6, [10–7]

Events
Singles	Doubles
← 2018 ·	Sibiu Open	· 2020 →

Kevin Krawietz and Andreas Mies were the defending champions but chose not to defend their title.

Sadio Doumbia and Fabien Reboul won the title after defeating Ivan and Matej Sabanov 6–4, 3–6, [10–7] in the final.

== Seeds ==
1. (Croatia) Ivan Sabanov / (Croatia) Matej Sabanov (final)
2. (Spain) Pedro Martínez / (Spain) Sergio Martos Gornés (semifinals)
3. (France) Sadio Doumbia / (France) Fabien Reboul (champions)
4. (Argentina) Facundo Argüello / (Peru) Sergio Galdós (first round)

== Draw ==
=== Key ===
- Q = Qualifier
- WC = Wild card
- LL = Lucky loser
- Alt = Alternate
- SE = Special exempt
- PR = Protected ranking
- ITF = ITF entry
- JE = Junior exempt
- w/o = Walkover
- r = Retired
- d = Defaulted
- SR = Special ranking

First round
1	(Croatia) I Sabanov (Croatia) M Sabanov	6	6
WC	(Romania) Adrian Barbu (Romania) P Grigoriu	2	3
(Italy) Fabrizio Ornago (Peru) JP Varillas	3	6	[8]
(Australia) C O'Connell (Serbia) D Petrović	6	3	[10]
4	(Argentina) F Argüello (Peru) S Galdós	6^{4}	1
(Portugal) P Sousa (Netherlands) M Vervoort	7^{7}	6
(Czech Republic) V Kopřiva (Czech Republic) J Pospíšil	7	4	[9]
Alt	(Czech Republic) P Nouza (Czech Republic) V Šafránek	5	6	[11]
(Czech Republic) Z Kolář (Croatia) N Serdarušić	7	5	[8]
(Romania) VV Cornea (Romania) A Jecan	5	7	[10]
WC	(Romania) FC Jianu (Spain) N Sánchez Izquierdo	3	1
3	(France) S Doumbia (France) F Reboul	6	6
(Spain) J Barranco Cosano (Peru) A Merino	6	6
(Kazakhstan) D Popko (Germany) P Torebko	4	2
WC	(Poland) Michał Dembek (Romania) D Dima	5	2
2	(Spain) P Martínez (Spain) S Martos Gornés	7	6

Quarterfinals
1	(Croatia) I Sabanov (Croatia) M Sabanov	6^{2}	7^{7}	[10]
(Australia) C O'Connell (Serbia) D Petrović	7^{7}	6^{2}	[5]
(Portugal) P Sousa (Netherlands) M Vervoort	4	4
Alt	(Czech Republic) P Nouza (Czech Republic) V Šafránek	6	6
(Romania) VV Cornea (Romania) A Jecan	7	3	[10]
3	(France) S Doumbia (France) F Reboul	5	6	[12]
(Spain) J Barranco Cosano (Peru) A Merino	4	2
2	(Spain) P Martínez (Spain) S Martos Gornés	6	6

Semifinals
1	(Croatia) I Sabanov (Croatia) M Sabanov	2	7^{7}	[10]
Alt	(Czech Republic) P Nouza (Czech Republic) V Šafránek	6	6^{2}	[8]
3	(France) S Doumbia (France) F Reboul	6	6^{2}	[10]
2	(Spain) P Martínez (Spain) S Martos Gornés	3	7^{7}	[7]

Final
1	(Croatia) I Sabanov (Croatia) M Sabanov	4	6	[7]
3	(France) S Doumbia (France) F Reboul	6	3	[10]
