= 2013 Sibiu Open – Doubles =

Doubles
- 2013 Sibiu Open

Final
- Champion: (Australia) Rameez Junaid (Austria) Philipp Oswald
- Runner-up: (United Kingdom) Jamie Delgado (Australia) Jordan Kerr
- Score: 6–4, 6–4

Events
Singles	Doubles
← 2012 ·	Sibiu Open	· 2014 →

Marin Draganja and Lovro Zovko were the defending champions but chose not to compete.

Rameez Junaid and Philipp Oswald won the title, defeating Jamie Delgado and Jordan Kerr 6–4, 6–4 in the final.

== Seeds ==
1. (Australia) Rameez Junaid / (Austria) Philipp Oswald (champions)
2. (United Kingdom) Jamie Delgado / (Australia) Jordan Kerr (final)
3. (Germany) Gero Kretschmer / (Germany) Alexander Satschko (first round)
4. (Netherlands) Stephan Fransen / (Netherlands) Wesley Koolhof (quarterfinals)

== Draw ==
=== Key ===
- Q = Qualifier
- WC = Wild card
- LL = Lucky loser
- Alt = Alternate
- SE = Special exempt
- PR = Protected ranking
- ITF = ITF entry
- JE = Junior exempt
- w/o = Walkover
- r = Retired
- d = Defaulted
- SR = Special ranking

=== Draw ===
First round
1	(Australia) R Junaid (Austria) P Oswald	7^{9}	6
(Poland) A Kapaś (Poland) G Panfil	6^{7}	3
WC	(Romania) Lucian Gheorghe (Romania) P Grigoriu	7	6
WC	(Romania) Dan Dumitrașcu (Romania) Eduard Popa	5	3
3	(Germany) G Kretschmer (Germany) A Satschko	2	6	5
(United States) V Mirzadeh (Czech Republic) J Pospíšil	6	0	[10]
(Italy) M Cecchinato (Italy) R Marcora	0	6^{9}
(Slovakia) K Čapkovič (Slovakia) P Červenák	6	7^{11}
WC	(Romania) Rareș Ispas (Italy) F Volandri	1	0
(Romania) Alexandru-Daniel Carpen (Croatia) M Pavić	6	6
(Romania) P-A Luncanu (Romania) F Mergea	6^{4}	3
4	(Netherlands) S Fransen (Netherlands) W Koolhof	7^{7}	6
(Italy) A Giannessi (Italy) A Motti	4	6^{11}
(Serbia) N Ćirić (Serbia) G Tošić	6	7^{13}
(Netherlands) S Groen (Netherlands) B Westerhof	3	1
2	(United Kingdom) J Delgado (Australia) J Kerr	6	6

Quarterfinals
1	(Australia) R Junaid (Austria) P Oswald	6	6
WC	(Romania) L Gheorghe (Romania) P Grigoriu	3	2
(United States) V Mirzadeh (Czech Republic) J Pospíšil	w/o
(Slovakia) K Čapkovič (Slovakia) P Červenák
(Romania) A-D Carpen (Croatia) M Pavić	7^{7}	6
4	(Netherlands) S Fransen (Netherlands) W Koolhof	6^{4}	4
(Serbia) N Ćirić (Serbia) G Tošić	6^{4}	3
2	(United Kingdom) J Delgado (Australia) J Kerr	7^{7}	6

Semifinals
1	(Australia) R Junaid (Austria) P Oswald	7^{10}	6
(United States) V Mirzadeh (Czech Republic) J Pospíšil	6^{8}	4
(Romania) A-D Carpen (Croatia) M Pavić	6	2	[4]
2	(United Kingdom) J Delgado (Australia) J Kerr	2	6	[10]

Final
1	(Australia) R Junaid (Austria) P Oswald	6	6
2	(United Kingdom) J Delgado (Australia) J Kerr	4	4
