= 2021 Sibiu Open – Singles =

Singles
- 2021 Sibiu Open

Final
- Champion: (Italy) Stefano Travaglia
- Runner-up: (Australia) Thanasi Kokkinakis
- Score: 7–6^{(7–4)}, 6–2

Events
Singles	Doubles
← 2020 ·	Sibiu Open	· 2022 →

Marc-Andrea Hüsler was the defending champion but lost in the semifinals to Thanasi Kokkinakis.

Stefano Travaglia won the title after defeating Kokkinakis 7–6^{(7–4)}, 6–2 in the final.

== Seeds ==
1. (Italy) Stefano Travaglia (champion)
2. (Moldova) Radu Albot (first round)
3. (Slovakia) Alex Molčan (quarterfinals)
4. (Bosnia and Herzegovina) Damir Džumhur (second round)
5. (Czech Republic) Zdeněk Kolář (quarterfinals)
6. (Switzerland) Marc-Andrea Hüsler (semifinals)
7. (Australia) Thanasi Kokkinakis (final)
8. (India) Sumit Nagal (semifinals)

== Draw ==
=== Key ===
- Q = Qualifier
- WC = Wild card
- LL = Lucky loser
- Alt = Alternate
- ITF = ITF entry
- PR = Protected ranking
- SR = Special ranking
- SE = Special exempt
- JE = Junior exempt
- JR = Junior Accelerator Programme entrant
- CO = College Accelerator Programme entrant
- NG = Next Gen Accelerator Program entrant
- w/o = Walkover
- r = Retired
- d = Defaulted

=== Finals ===
Semifinals
1	(Italy) Stefano Travaglia	6	0	6
8	(India) Sumit Nagal	4	6	0
7	(Australia) Thanasi Kokkinakis	6	6
6	(Switzerland) Marc-Andrea Hüsler	2	1

Final
1	(Italy) Stefano Travaglia	7^{7}	6
7	(Australia) Thanasi Kokkinakis	6^{4}	2

=== Top half ===
First round
1	(Italy) S Travaglia	6	6
(Czech Republic) L Rosol	3	3
Q	(Russia) Yan Bondarevskiy	6	6
WC	(Romania) Vlad Andrei Dancu	2	3
Q	(Romania) Ștefan Paloși	7	6
Q	(Romania) ND Ionel	5	1
(Romania) M Copil	5	4
5	(Czech Republic) Z Kolář	7	6
4	(Bosnia and Herzegovina) D Džumhur	6	6
WC	(Greece) Pe Tsitsipas	2	0
LL	(Germany) Elmar Ejupovic	1	3
(France) G Blancaneaux	6	6
(Czech Republic) J Lehečka	7^{7}	6
(Romania) FC Jianu	6^{5}	2
(Austria) L Miedler	3	1
8	(India) S Nagal	6	6

Second round
1	(Italy) S Travaglia	6	6
Q	(Russia) Y Bondarevskiy	3	2
Q	(Romania) Ș Paloși	5	5
5	(Czech Republic) Z Kolář	7	7
4	(Bosnia and Herzegovina) D Džumhur	2	6	2
(France) G Blancaneaux	6	4	6
(Czech Republic) J Lehečka	5	3
8	(India) S Nagal	7	6

Quarterfinals
1	(Italy) S Travaglia	6	5	7^{8}
5	(Czech Republic) Z Kolář	0	7	6^{6}
(France) G Blancaneaux	6^{3}	3
8	(India) S Nagal	7^{7}	6

Semifinals
1	(Italy) S Travaglia	6	0	6
8	(India) S Nagal	4	6	0

=== Bottom half ===
First round
7	(Australia) T Kokkinakis	6	6
(Germany) M Marterer	4	3
(Turkey) E Kırkın	7	4	6
(Russia) A Vatutin	5	6	1
(Czech Republic) V Kopřiva	7	7
(Serbia) D Petrović	5	5
(Italy) R Bonadio	4	2
3	(Slovakia) A Molčan	6	6
6	(Switzerland) M-A Hüsler	6	6
(Netherlands) J Sels	3	3
(United Kingdom) J Clarke	6^{5}	4
Q	(Israel) Y Oliel	7^{7}	6
(Italy) F Agamenone	6	7^{7}
WC	(Romania) VV Cornea	1	6^{3}
(Ukraine) V Sachko	6	6
2	(Moldova) R Albot	3	3

Second round
7	(Australia) T Kokkinakis	6	6
(Turkey) E Kırkın	1	1
(Czech Republic) V Kopřiva	6	0	4
3	(Slovakia) A Molčan	1	6	6
6	(Switzerland) M-A Hüsler	6	6
Q	(Israel) Y Oliel	4	1
(Italy) F Agamenone	7^{7}	7
(Ukraine) V Sachko	6^{4}	5

Quarterfinals
7	(Australia) T Kokkinakis	6	7^{7}
3	(Slovakia) A Molčan	2	6^{4}
6	(Switzerland) M-A Hüsler	7^{7}	6
(Italy) F Agamenone	6^{5}	4

Semifinals
7	(Australia) T Kokkinakis	6	6
6	(Switzerland) M-A Hüsler	2	1
