= 2020 Sibiu Open – Singles =

Singles
- 2020 Sibiu Open

Final
- Champion: (Switzerland) Marc-Andrea Hüsler
- Runner-up: (Argentina) Tomás Martín Etcheverry
- Score: 7–5, 6–0

Events
Singles	Doubles
← 2019 ·	Sibiu Open	· 2021 →

Danilo Petrović was the defending champion but chose not to defend his title.

Marc-Andrea Hüsler won the title after defeating Tomás Martín Etcheverry 7–5, 6–0 in the final.

== Seeds ==
1. (France) Arthur Rinderknech (second round)
2. (France) Quentin Halys (first round)
3. (Switzerland) Marc-Andrea Hüsler (champion)
4. (Argentina) Francisco Cerúndolo (semifinals)
5. (Russia) Evgeny Karlovskiy (first round)
6. (Spain) Adrián Menéndez Maceiras (first round)
7. (Tunisia) Malek Jaziri (quarterfinals)
8. (Japan) Shuichi Sekiguchi (second round)

== Draw ==
=== Key ===
- Q = Qualifier
- WC = Wild card
- LL = Lucky loser
- Alt = Alternate
- SE = Special exempt
- PR = Protected ranking
- ITF = ITF entry
- JE = Junior exempt
- w/o = Walkover
- r = Retired
- d = Defaulted
- SR = Special ranking

=== Finals ===
Semifinals
Q	(Spain) Carlos Gómez-Herrera	6^{5}	7^{8}	4
3	(Switzerland) Marc-Andrea Hüsler	7^{7}	6^{6}	6
4	(Argentina) Francisco Cerúndolo	3	0
(Argentina) Tomás Martín Etcheverry	6	6

Final
3	(Switzerland) Marc-Andrea Hüsler	7	6
(Argentina) Tomás Martín Etcheverry	5	0

=== Top half ===
First round
1	(France) A Rinderknech	7	6
(Norway) V Durasovic	5	3
(Germany) J Härteis	7	6
WC	(Romania) ND Ionel	5	2
(Czech Republic) V Kopřiva	2	3
Q	(Spain) C Gómez-Herrera	6	6
(France) C Denolly	6	5	6
5	(Russia) E Karlovskiy	3	7	0
3	(Switzerland) M-A Hüsler	6	7^{7}
(Austria) L Miedler	4	6^{1}
(Spain) O Roca Batalla	2	4
(Spain) R Ortega Olmedo	6	6
(Croatia) B Gojo	7	6
(Croatia) N Serdarušić	5	4
(Chile) MT Barrios Vera	6	6
6	(Spain) A Menéndez Maceiras	2	3

Second round
1	(France) A Rinderknech	3	6	6^{4}
(Germany) J Härteis	6	3	7^{7}
Q	(Spain) C Gómez-Herrera	3	7^{7}	6
(France) C Denolly	6	6^{4}	3
3	(Switzerland) M-A Hüsler	6	6
(Spain) R Ortega Olmedo	2	4
(Croatia) B Gojo	6	6^{1}	6
(Chile) MT Barrios Vera	1	7^{7}	4

Quarterfinals
(Germany) J Härteis	3	7^{10}	2
Q	(Spain) C Gómez-Herrera	6	6^{8}	6
3	(Switzerland) M-A Hüsler	6	5	6
(Croatia) B Gojo	4	7	4

Semifinals
Q	(Spain) C Gómez-Herrera	6^{5}	7^{8}	4
3	(Switzerland) M-A Hüsler	7^{7}	6^{6}	6

=== Bottom half ===
First round
7	(Tunisia) M Jaziri	6	6
(Poland) K Żuk	4	2
(Brazil) O Luz	6	3	6
WC	(Romania) VV Cornea	1	6	2
Q	(Germany) Elmar Ejupovic	3	6^{2}
PR	(Spain) Í Cervantes	6	7^{7}
Q	(France) Matthieu Perchicot	4	3
4	(Argentina) F Cerúndolo	6	6
8	(Japan) Shuichi Sekiguchi	7	7^{8}
WC	(Romania) D Dima	5	6^{6}
Alt	(Brazil) F Meligeni Alves	6	6
Q	(Turkey) E Kırkın	4	3
(India) S Mukund	4	6^{5}
(Argentina) JM Cerúndolo	6	7^{7}
(Argentina) TM Etcheverry	7^{7}	4	7^{7}
2	(France) Q Halys	6^{3}	6	6^{2}

Second round
7	(Tunisia) M Jaziri	6	7^{7}
(Brazil) O Luz	3	6^{3}
PR	(Spain) Í Cervantes	7^{9}	3	4
4	(Argentina) F Cerúndolo	6^{7}	6	6
8	(Japan) S Sekiguchi	2	3
Alt	(Brazil) F Meligeni Alves	6	6
(Argentina) JM Cerúndolo	4	6^{7}
(Argentina) TM Etcheverry	6	7^{9}

Quarterfinals
7	(Tunisia) M Jaziri	2	1
4	(Argentina) F Cerúndolo	6	6
Alt	(Brazil) F Meligeni Alves	3	0
(Argentina) TM Etcheverry	6	6

Semifinals
4	(Argentina) F Cerúndolo	3	0
(Argentina) TM Etcheverry	6	6
