= 2013 Sibiu Open – Singles =

Singles
- 2013 Sibiu Open

Final
- Champion: (Czech Republic) Jaroslav Pospíšil
- Runner-up: (Italy) Marco Cecchinato
- Score: 4–6, 6–4, 6–1

Events
Singles	Doubles
← 2012 ·	Sibiu Open	· 2014 →

Adrian Ungur was the defending champion, but lost in the semifinals to Jaroslav Pospíšil.

Pospíšil went on to win the title, defeating Marco Cecchinato 4–6, 6–4, 6–1 in the final.

== Seeds ==
1. (Italy) Filippo Volandri (quarterfinals, retired)
2. (Czech Republic) Jan Hájek (second round)
3. (Germany) Julian Reister (quarterfinals)
4. (Austria) Andreas Haider-Maurer (first round)
5. (Romania) Adrian Ungur (semifinals)
6. (Serbia) Dušan Lajović (semifinals)
7. (Spain) Pere Riba (withdrew)
8. (Italy) Marco Cecchinato (final)
9. (Netherlands) Thomas Schoorel (second round)

== Draw ==
=== Key ===
- Q = Qualifier
- WC = Wild card
- LL = Lucky loser
- Alt = Alternate
- SE = Special exempt
- PR = Protected ranking
- ITF = ITF entry
- JE = Junior exempt
- w/o = Walkover
- r = Retired
- d = Defaulted
- SR = Special ranking

=== Finals ===
Semifinals
6	(Serbia) Dušan Lajović	4	3
8	(Italy) Marco Cecchinato	6	6
5	(Romania) Adrian Ungur	1	3
(Czech Republic) Jaroslav Pospíšil	6	6

Final
8	(Italy) Marco Cecchinato	6	4	1
(Czech Republic) Jaroslav Pospíšil	4	6	6

=== Top half ===
First round
1/WC	(Italy) F Volandri	6	6
(Ukraine) A Smirnov	0	0
Q	(Germany) R Becker	6	4	7^{8}
WC	(Romania) F Mergea	3	6	6^{6}
Q	(Croatia) T Androić	3	6	7^{7}
(Slovakia) K Čapkovič	6	2	6^{3}
(France) A Michon	4	4
6	(Serbia) D Lajović	6	6
4	(Austria) A Haider-Maurer	6	0	3
(Serbia) B Pašanski	3	6	6
(Poland) G Panfil	7	6
(Portugal) R Machado	5	2
Q	(Croatia) M Delić	6	6
(Greece) T Angelinos	3	2
(Slovakia) P Červenák	1	1
8	(Italy) M Cecchinato	6	6

Second round
1/WC	(Italy) F Volandri	6^{5}	6	6
Q	(Germany) R Becker	7^{7}	4	3
Q	(Croatia) T Androić	4	5
6	(Serbia) D Lajović	6	7
(Serbia) B Pašanski	7	2	6
(Poland) G Panfil	5	6	3
Q	(Croatia) M Delić	2	1
8	(Italy) M Cecchinato	6	6

Quarterfinals
1/WC	(Italy) F Volandri	4	0^{r}
6	(Serbia) D Lajović	6	4
(Serbia) B Pašanski	1	6	2
8	(Italy) M Cecchinato	6	4	6

Semifinals
6	(Serbia) D Lajović	4	3
8	(Italy) M Cecchinato	6	6

=== Bottom half ===
First round
5	(Romania) A Ungur	6	7^{7}
Q	(Romania) R Sabău	1	6^{2}
(Canada) S Diez	6	4	6
(Netherlands) B Westerhof	3	6	4
(Romania) V Crivoi	1	2
LL	(Bulgaria) T Grozdanov	6	6
WC	(Romania) Alexandru-Daniel Carpen	1	0
3	(Germany) J Reister	6	6
9	(Netherlands) T Schoorel	6	6
(Germany) P Torebko	2	2
(Italy) R Marcora	3	2
(Czech Republic) J Pospíšil	6	6
(Italy) A Giannessi	6	4	6
(Croatia) M Pavić	2	6	2
WC	(Romania) Rareș Ispas	1	1
2	(Czech Republic) J Hájek	6	6

Second round
5	(Romania) A Ungur	6^{5}	6	7^{8}
(Canada) S Diez	7^{7}	3	6^{6}
LL	(Bulgaria) T Grozdanov	2	2
3	(Germany) J Reister	6	6
9	(Netherlands) T Schoorel	6^{3}	2
(Czech Republic) J Pospíšil	7^{7}	6
(Italy) A Giannessi	7^{7}	6^{5}	6
2	(Czech Republic) J Hájek	6^{2}	7^{7}	4

Quarterfinals
5	(Romania) A Ungur	7	6
3	(Germany) J Reister	5	4
(Czech Republic) J Pospíšil	6	6
(Italy) A Giannessi	1	4

Semifinals
5	(Romania) A Ungur	1	3
(Czech Republic) J Pospíšil	6	6
