= 2015 Sibiu Open – Doubles =

Doubles
- 2015 Sibiu Open

Final
- Champions: (Romania) Victor Crivoi (Romania) Petru-Alexandru Luncanu
- Runners-up: (Serbia) Ilija Bozoljac (Serbia) Dušan Lajović
- Score: 6–4, 6–3

Events
Singles	Doubles
← 2014 ·	Sibiu Open	· 2016 →

Potito Starace and Adrian Ungur were the defending champions, but Starace did not defend his title while Ungur partnering Victor Vlad Cornea lost in the first round. Victor Crivoi and Petru-Alexandru Luncanu won the title beating Ilija Bozoljac and Dušan Lajović in the final 6–4, 6–3.

== Seeds ==
1. (Croatia) Dino Marcan / (Croatia) Antonio Šančić (semifinals)
2. (United States) James Cerretani / (United States) Matt Seeberger (semifinals)
3. (Serbia) Ilija Bozoljac / (Serbia) Dušan Lajović (final)
4. (Romania) Victor Vlad Cornea / (Romania) Adrian Ungur (first round)

== Draw ==
=== Key ===
- Q = Qualifier
- WC = Wild card
- LL = Lucky loser
- Alt = Alternate
- SE = Special exempt
- PR = Protected ranking
- ITF = ITF entry
- JE = Junior exempt
- w/o = Walkover
- r = Retired
- d = Defaulted
- SR = Special ranking

First round
1	(Croatia) D Marcan (Croatia) A Šančić	6	6
(Bosnia and Herzegovina) T Brkić (Romania) Alexandru-Daniel Carpen	1	4
(Serbia) Ilija Vucic (Serbia) M Zekić	6	6
WC	(Poland) Michal Dembek (Romania) A Jecan	4	3
3	(Serbia) I Bozoljac (Serbia) D Lajović	2	7^{8}	[11]
Alt	(Slovakia) F Horanský (Bulgaria) D Kuzmanov	6	6^{6}	[9]
(Slovakia) J Kovalík (Czech Republic) J Mertl	3	6	[10]
(Italy) A Giannessi (Italy) Riccardo Sinicropi	6	1	[5]
(France) M Chazal (France) Maxime Tabatruong	2	5
WC	(Romania) V Hănescu (Switzerland) C Sturdza	6	7
WC	(Romania) V Crivoi (Romania) P-A Luncanu	6	4	[10]
4	(Romania) VV Cornea (Romania) A Ungur	4	6	[4]
(Belgium) J Cagnina (Belgium) G Gigounon	2	1
PR	(Canada) S Diez (Spain) P Riba	6	6
PR	(Netherlands) S Fransen (Spain) Marc Giner	3	7^{8}	[7]
2	(United States) J Cerretani (United States) M Seeberger	6	6^{6}	[10]

Quarterfinals
1	(Croatia) D Marcan (Croatia) A Šančić	3	6	[10]
(Serbia) I Vucic (Serbia) M Zekić	6	4	[4]
3	(Serbia) I Bozoljac (Serbia) D Lajović	6	7
(Slovakia) J Kovalík (Czech Republic) J Mertl	2	5
WC	(Romania) V Hănescu (Switzerland) C Sturdza	2	5
WC	(Romania) V Crivoi (Romania) P-A Luncanu	6	7
PR	(Canada) S Diez (Spain) P Riba	7^{10}	5	[6]
2	(United States) J Cerretani (United States) M Seeberger	6^{8}	7	[10]

Semifinals
1	(Croatia) D Marcan (Croatia) A Šančić	4	6	[7]
3	(Serbia) I Bozoljac (Serbia) D Lajović	6	1	[10]
WC	(Romania) V Crivoi (Romania) P-A Luncanu	6	6
2	(United States) J Cerretani (United States) M Seeberger	4	4

Final
3	(Serbia) I Bozoljac (Serbia) D Lajović	4	3
WC	(Romania) V Crivoi (Romania) P-A Luncanu	6	6
