= 2015 Sibiu Open – Singles =

Singles
- 2015 Sibiu Open

Final
- Champion: (Romania) Adrian Ungur
- Runner-up: (Spain) Pere Riba
- Score: 6–4, 3–6, 7–5

Events
Singles	Doubles
← 2014 ·	Sibiu Open	· 2016 →

Jason Kubler was the defending champion but chose not to compete this year.

== Seeds ==
1. (Serbia) Dušan Lajović (quarterfinals)
2. (Germany) Tobias Kamke (first round)
3. (Serbia) Laslo Djere (first round)
4. (Belgium) Germain Gigounon (second round)
5. (Italy) Gianluca Naso (first round)
6. (France) Calvin Hemery (second round)
7. (France) Tristan Lamasine (second round)
8. (Czech Republic) Jan Mertl (first round)

== Draw ==
=== Key ===
- Q = Qualifier
- WC = Wild card
- LL = Lucky loser
- Alt = Alternate
- SE = Special exempt
- PR = Protected ranking
- ITF = ITF entry
- JE = Junior exempt
- w/o = Walkover
- r = Retired
- d = Defaulted
- SR = Special ranking

=== Finals ===
Semifinals
(Romania) Adrian Ungur	6	6
Q	(Romania) Petru-Alexandru Luncanu	1	1
(Spain) Pere Riba	6	7
(Serbia) Miljan Zekić	3	5

Final
(Romania) Adrian Ungur	6	3	7
(Spain) Pere Riba	4	6	5

=== Top half ===
First round
1	(Serbia) D Lajović	6	6
WC	(Romania) D Dima	2	4
Q	(Spain) Marc Giner	3	6	5
LL	(Romania) Andrei Stefan Apostol	6	1	7
(Romania) A Ungur	6	3	6
(France) Maxime Tabatruong	2	6	2
(Italy) A Giannessi	6	4	4
7	(France) T Lamasine	3	6	6
3	(Serbia) L Djere	2	4
Q	(Romania) P-A Luncanu	6	6
(France) M Chazal	6	6
WC	(Poland) Michal Dembek	2	1
Q	(Italy) Riccardo Sinicropi	2	1
(Belgium) J Cagnina	6	6
(Bulgaria) D Kuzmanov	6	5	7
8	(Czech Republic) J Mertl	3	7	5

Second round
1	(Serbia) D Lajović	3
LL	(Romania) AS Apostol	0^{r}
(Romania) A Ungur	6	6
7	(France) T Lamasine	4	4
Q	(Romania) P-A Luncanu	6	4	6
(France) M Chazal	4	6	3
(Belgium) J Cagnina	3	6^{1}
(Bulgaria) D Kuzmanov	6	7^{7}

Quarterfinals
1	(Serbia) D Lajović	4	6	3
(Romania) A Ungur	6	2	6
Q	(Romania) P-A Luncanu	7	6^{7}	6
(Bulgaria) D Kuzmanov	5	7^{9}	3

Semifinals
(Romania) A Ungur	6	6
Q	(Romania) P-A Luncanu	1	1

=== Bottom half ===
First round
5	(Italy) G Naso	6^{5}	4
WC	(Romania) V Crivoi	7^{7}	6
(Slovakia) F Horanský	7
(Serbia) P Krstin	5^{r}
(Romania) V Hănescu	6	3	4
(Spain) P Riba	4	6	6
(Italy) Omar Giacalone	6^{7}	4
4	(Belgium) G Gigounon	7^{9}	6
6	(France) C Hemery	7^{7}	6
Q	(Canada) S Diez	6^{1}	4
WC	(Romania) VV Cornea	4	6	3
(Italy) G Mager	6	2	6
(Bosnia and Herzegovina) T Brkić	7^{7}	4	2
(Serbia) M Zekić	6^{4}	6	6
(Slovakia) J Kovalík	6	7^{7}
2	(Germany) T Kamke	4	6^{3}

Second round
WC	(Romania) V Crivoi	7^{9}	3	6
(Slovakia) F Horanský	6^{7}	6	3
(Spain) P Riba	6	6^{0}	6
4	(Belgium) G Gigounon	0	7^{7}	4
6	(France) C Hemery	6	3	2
(Italy) G Mager	3	6	6
(Serbia) M Zekić	6	4	7^{7}
(Slovakia) J Kovalík	2	6	6^{0}

Quarterfinals
WC	(Romania) V Crivoi	4	0
(Spain) P Riba	6	6
(Italy) G Mager	3	5
(Serbia) M Zekić	6	7

Semifinals
(Spain) P Riba	6	7
(Serbia) M Zekić	3	5
