= 2024 Sibiu Open – Doubles =

Doubles
- 2024 Sibiu Open

Final
- Champions: (Peru) Alexander Merino (Germany) Christoph Negritu
- Runners-up: (Canada) Liam Draxl (Canada) Cleeve Harper
- Score: 6–2, 7–6^{(7–2)}

Events
Singles	Doubles
- Sibiu Open

Andrew Paulson and Michael Vrbenský were the defending champions but chose not to defend their title.

Alexander Merino and Christoph Negritu won the title after defeating Liam Draxl and Cleeve Harper 6–2, 7–6^{(7–2)} in the final.

== Seeds ==
1. (Bulgaria) Alexander Donski / (Bulgaria) Anthony Genov (quarterfinals)
2. (Peru) Alexander Merino / (Germany) Christoph Negritu (champions)
3. (Canada) Liam Draxl / (Canada) Cleeve Harper (final)
4. (Portugal) Pedro Araújo / (France) Corentin Denolly (quarterfinals)

== Draw ==
Key

- Q = Qualifier
- WC = Wild card
- LL = Lucky loser
- Alt = Alternate
- ITF = ITF entry
- PR = Protected ranking
- SR = Special ranking
- SE = Special exempt
- JE = Junior exempt
- JR = Junior Accelerator Programme entrant
- CO = College Accelerator Programme entrant
- NG = Next Gen Accelerator Program entrant
- w/o = Walkover
- r = Retired
- d = Defaulted

=== Draw ===
First round
1	(Bulgaria) A Donski (Bulgaria) A Genov	7	7
(Italy) F Bondioli (Italy) F Romano	5	5
WC	(Romania) Rareș Andrei Golescu (Argentina) GA Olivieri	2	1
(Spain) B Pujol Navarro (Spain) N Sánchez Izquierdo	6	6
3	(Canada) L Draxl (Canada) C Harper	6	6
WC	(Romania) Robert Gabriel Ionescu (Spain) Jorge Plans	1	2
(Romania) B Pavel (Moldova) I Snițari	7	1	[10]
(Italy) F Agamenone (Italy) Facundo Juárez	5	6	[5]
(Croatia) Z Babić (India) D Sharan	1	1
(Ukraine) Eric Vanshelboim (United Kingdom) M Whitehouse	6	6
Alt	(Bulgaria) R Shandarov (Bulgaria) V Shandarov	2	3
4	(Portugal) Pedro Araújo (France) C Denolly	6	6
(Czech Republic) H Bartoň (France) A Géa	w/o
(Italy) E Dalla Valle (Italy) S Travaglia
(United States) Lucas Horve (United Kingdom) Oliver Okonkwo	4	4
2	(Peru) A Merino (Germany) C Negritu	6	6

Quarterfinals
1	(Bulgaria) A Donski (Bulgaria) A Genov	4	6	[8]
(Spain) B Pujol Navarro (Spain) N Sánchez Izquierdo	6	4	[10]
3	(Canada) L Draxl (Canada) C Harper	7^{7}	2	[10]
(Romania) B Pavel (Moldova) I Snițari	6^{2}	6	[7]
(Ukraine) E Vanshelboim (United Kingdom) M Whitehouse	6	6
4	(Portugal) P Araújo (France) C Denolly	3	3
(Czech Republic) H Bartoň (France) A Géa	3	5
2	(Peru) A Merino (Germany) C Negritu	6	7

Semifinals
(Spain) B Pujol Navarro (Spain) N Sánchez Izquierdo	3	6^{2}
3	(Canada) L Draxl (Canada) C Harper	6	7^{7}
(Ukraine) E Vanshelboim (United Kingdom) M Whitehouse	4	6^{5}
2	(Peru) A Merino (Germany) C Negritu	6	7^{7}

Final
3	(Canada) L Draxl (Canada) C Harper	2	6^{2}
2	(Peru) A Merino (Germany) C Negritu	6	7^{7}
