= 2018 Sibiu Open =

- Date: 17–23 September
- Edition: 7th
- Location: Sibiu, Romania

Champions

Singles
- (Romania) Dragoș Dima

Doubles
- (Germany) Kevin Krawietz / (Germany) Andreas Mies
← 2017 ·	Sibiu Open	· 2019 →

The 2018 Sibiu Open was a professional tennis tournament played on clay courts. It was the seventh edition of the tournament which was part of the 2018 ATP Challenger Tour. It took place in Sibiu, Romania between 17 and 23 September 2018.

== Singles main-draw entrants ==
=== Seeds ===
Country	Player	Rank^{1}	Seed
SRB	Laslo Đere	86	1
AUT	Dennis Novak	133	2
POR	Pedro Sousa	144	3
ITA	Simone Bolelli	145	4
AUS	Marc Polmans	163	5
ITA	Gianluigi Quinzi	165	6
ESP	Pedro Martínez	184	7
CZE	Lukáš Rosol	185	8

- ^{1} Rankings are as of 10 September 2018.

=== Other entrants ===
The following players received wildcards into the singles main draw:

- (Romania) Victor Vlad Cornea
- (Poland) Michał Dembek
- (Romania) Dragoș Dima
- (Romania) Adrian Ungur

The following player received entry into the singles main draw as an alternate:

- (Bosnia and Herzegovina) Aldin Šetkić

The following players received entry from the qualifying draw:

- (Romania) Nicolae Frunză
- (Germany) Jeremy Jahn
- (Italy) Fabrizio Ornago
- (Netherlands) Jelle Sels

The following player received entry as a lucky loser:

- (Spain) Javier Barranco Cosano

== Champions ==
=== Singles ===
- (Romania) Dragoș Dima def. (Netherlands) Jelle Sels 6–3, 6–2.

=== Doubles ===
- (Germany) Kevin Krawietz / (Germany) Andreas Mies def. (Poland) Tomasz Bednarek / (Netherlands) David Pel 6–4, 6–2.
