= 2018 Sibiu Open – Doubles =

Doubles
- 2018 Sibiu Open

Final
- Champions: (Germany) Kevin Krawietz (Germany) Andreas Mies
- Runners-up: (Poland) Tomasz Bednarek (Netherlands) David Pel
- Score: 6–4, 6–2

Events
Singles	Doubles
- Sibiu Open

Marco Cecchinato and Matteo Donati were the defending champions but chose not to defend their title.

Kevin Krawietz and Andreas Mies won the title after defeating Tomasz Bednarek and David Pel 6–4, 6–2 in the final.

== Seeds ==
1. (Germany) Kevin Krawietz / (Germany) Andreas Mies (champions)
2. (Kazakhstan) Timur Khabibulin / (Ukraine) Vladyslav Manafov (first round)
3. (Poland) Tomasz Bednarek / (Netherlands) David Pel (final)
4. (Spain) Pedro Martínez / (Netherlands) Mark Vervoort (semifinals)

== Draw ==
Key

- Q = Qualifier
- WC = Wild card
- LL = Lucky loser
- Alt = Alternate
- ITF = ITF entry
- PR = Protected ranking
- SR = Special ranking
- SE = Special exempt
- JE = Junior exempt
- JR = Junior Accelerator Programme entrant
- CO = College Accelerator Programme entrant
- NG = Next Gen Accelerator Program entrant
- w/o = Walkover
- r = Retired
- d = Defaulted

First round
1	(Germany) K Krawietz (Germany) A Mies	6	7^{7}
(Slovakia) F Horanský (Bulgaria) D Kuzmanov	4	6^{4}
(Poland) G Panfil (Ukraine) V Uzhylovskyi	7^{7}	6
(Poland) K Majchrzak (Poland) S Walków	6^{3}	4
4	(Spain) P Martínez (Netherlands) M Vervoort	6	6
WC	(Romania) VV Cornea (Romania) P-A Luncanu	2	4
(Italy) S Bolelli (Italy) G Quinzi	6	3	[15]
(Croatia) A Šančić (Croatia) N Serdarušić	4	6	[13]
Q	(Romania) D Dima (Netherlands) J Sels	4	2
(Czech Republic) Z Kolář (Portugal) G Oliveira	6	6
(Belgium) K Coppejans (Belgium) N Desein	2	6	[8]
3	(Poland) T Bednarek (Netherlands) D Pel	6	4	[10]
WC	(Poland) Michał Dembek (Poland) K Drzewiecki	3	4
WC	(Romania) P Grigoriu (Romania) F Mergea	6	6
(Spain) J Barranco Cosano (Spain) C Gómez-Herrera	6	4	[10]
2	(Kazakhstan) T Khabibulin (Ukraine) V Manafov	2	6	[4]

Quarterfinals
1	(Germany) K Krawietz (Germany) A Mies	6	7
(Poland) G Panfil (Ukraine) V Uzhylovskyi	4	5
4	(Spain) P Martínez (Netherlands) M Vervoort	w/o
(Italy) S Bolelli (Italy) G Quinzi
(Czech Republic) Z Kolář (Portugal) G Oliveira	4	3
3	(Poland) T Bednarek (Netherlands) D Pel	6	6
WC	(Romania) P Grigoriu (Romania) F Mergea	4	3
(Spain) J Barranco Cosano (Spain) C Gómez-Herrera	6	6

Semifinals
1	(Germany) K Krawietz (Germany) A Mies	6	6
4	(Spain) P Martínez (Netherlands) M Vervoort	2	3
3	(Poland) T Bednarek (Netherlands) D Pel	6	6
(Spain) J Barranco Cosano (Spain) C Gómez-Herrera	3	0

Final
1	(Germany) K Krawietz (Germany) A Mies	6	6
3	(Poland) T Bednarek (Netherlands) D Pel	4	2
