= 2022 Sibiu Open – Doubles =

Doubles
- 2022 Sibiu Open

Final
- Champions: (Serbia) Ivan Sabanov (Serbia) Matej Sabanov
- Runners-up: (Austria) Alexander Erler (Austria) Lucas Miedler
- Score: 3–6, 7–5, [10–4]

Events
Singles	Doubles
- Sibiu Open

Alexander Erler and Lucas Miedler were the defending champions but lost in the final to Ivan and Matej Sabanov.

Sabanov and Sabanov won the title after defeating Erler and Miedler 3–6, 7–5, [10–4] in the final.

== Seeds ==
1. (Austria) Alexander Erler / (Austria) Lucas Miedler (final)
2. (Serbia) Ivan Sabanov / (Serbia) Matej Sabanov (champions)
3. (Switzerland) Luca Margaroli / (India) Ramkumar Ramanathan (semifinals)
4. (Romania) Victor Vlad Cornea / (Czech Republic) Zdeněk Kolář (semifinals)

== Draw ==
Key

- Q = Qualifier
- WC = Wild card
- LL = Lucky loser
- Alt = Alternate
- ITF = ITF entry
- PR = Protected ranking
- SR = Special ranking
- SE = Special exempt
- JE = Junior exempt
- JR = Junior Accelerator Programme entrant
- CO = College Accelerator Programme entrant
- NG = Next Gen Accelerator Program entrant
- w/o = Walkover
- r = Retired
- d = Defaulted

First round
1	(Austria) A Erler (Austria) L Miedler	6	6
WC	(Romania) Robert Gabriel Ionescu (Romania) Marc Popescu	1	0
(Bosnia and Herzegovina) M Bašić (Bosnia and Herzegovina) N Fatić	0^{r}
(France) T Arribagé (France) L Sanchez	1
3	(Switzerland) L Margaroli (India) R Ramanathan	6^{7}	6	[10]
B Bobrov; I Gakhov	7^{9}	4	[8]
(United Kingdom) B Harris (Canada) K Stevenson	2	3
(Ukraine) G Kravchenko (Switzerland) J Nikles	6	6
(Romania) A Jecan (Sweden) DN Mădăraș	6	4	[7]
WC	(Romania) ND Ionel (Romania) Ștefan Paloși	3	6	[10]
(Italy) R Bonadio (Italy) G Fonio
4	(Romania) VV Cornea (Czech Republic) Z Kolář	w/o
(Croatia) Z Babić (Germany) K Wehnelt	5	7	[10]
(India) A Kadhe (Brazil) F Romboli	7	5	[3]
(India) A Chandrasekar (India) VS Prashanth	4	5
2	(Serbia) I Sabanov (Serbia) M Sabanov	6	7

Quarterfinals
1	(Austria) A Erler (Austria) L Miedler	6	6
(France) T Arribagé (France) L Sanchez	4	4
3	(Switzerland) L Margaroli (India) R Ramanathan	6	4	[10]
(Ukraine) G Kravchenko (Switzerland) J Nikles	1	6	[7]
WC	(Romania) ND Ionel (Romania) Ș Paloși	7	3	[8]
4	(Romania) VV Cornea (Czech Republic) Z Kolář	5	6	[10]
(Croatia) Z Babić (Germany) K Wehnelt	3	2
2	(Serbia) I Sabanov (Serbia) M Sabanov	6	6

Semifinals
1	(Austria) A Erler (Austria) L Miedler	7	6
3	(Switzerland) L Margaroli (India) R Ramanathan	5	3
4	(Romania) VV Cornea (Czech Republic) Z Kolář	6	6^{5}	[8]
2	(Serbia) I Sabanov (Serbia) M Sabanov	3	7^{7}	[10]

Final
1	(Austria) A Erler (Austria) L Miedler	6	5	[4]
2	(Serbia) I Sabanov (Serbia) M Sabanov	3	7	[10]
