= 2021 Sibiu Open =

Tennis tournament

- Date: 27 September – 3 October
- Edition: 10th
- Location: Sibiu, Romania

Champions

Singles
- (Italy) Stefano Travaglia

Doubles
- (Austria) Alexander Erler / (Austria) Lucas Miedler
| ← 2020 · | Sibiu Open | · 2022 → |

The 2021 Sibiu Open was a professional tennis tournament played on clay courts. It was the tenth edition of the tournament which was part of the 2021 ATP Challenger Tour. It took place in Sibiu, Romania between 27 September and 3 October 2021.

== Singles main-draw entrants ==
=== Seeds ===
| Country | Player | Rank^{1} | Seed |
|---|---|---|---|
| ITA | Stefano Travaglia | 98 | 1 |
| MDA | Radu Albot | 104 | 2 |
| SVK | Alex Molčan | 118 | 3 |
| BIH | Damir Džumhur | 129 | 4 |
| CZE | Zdeněk Kolář | 149 | 5 |
| SUI | Marc-Andrea Hüsler | 159 | 6 |
| AUS | Thanasi Kokkinakis | 183 | 7 |
| IND | Sumit Nagal | 185 | 8 |

- ^{1} Rankings are as of 20 September 2021.

=== Other entrants ===
The following players received wildcards into the singles main draw:

- (Romania) Victor Vlad Cornea
- (Romania) Vlad Andrei Dancu
- (Greece) Petros Tsitsipas

The following players received entry from the qualifying draw:

- (Russia) Yan Bondarevskiy
- (Romania) David Ionel
- (Israel) Yshai Oliel
- (Romania) Ștefan Paloși

The following player received entry as a lucky loser:

- (Germany) Elmar Ejupovic

== Champions ==
=== Singles ===
- (Italy) Stefano Travaglia def. (Australia) Thanasi Kokkinakis 7–6^{(7–4)}, 6–2.

=== Doubles ===
- (Austria) Alexander Erler / (Austria) Lucas Miedler def. (United States) James Cerretani / (Switzerland) Luca Margaroli 6–3, 6–1.
