= 2020 Sibiu Open =

- Date: 21–27 September
- Edition: 9th
- Location: Sibiu, Romania

Champions

Singles
- (Switzerland) Marc-Andrea Hüsler

Doubles
- (United States) Hunter Reese / (Poland) Jan Zieliński
| ← 2019 · | Sibiu Open | · 2021 → |

The 2020 Sibiu Open was a professional tennis tournament played on clay courts. It was the ninth edition of the tournament which was part of the 2020 ATP Challenger Tour. It took place in Sibiu, Romania between 21 and 27 September 2020.

== Singles main-draw entrants ==
=== Seeds ===
| Country | Player | Rank^{1} | Seed |
|---|---|---|---|
| FRA | Arthur Rinderknech | 163 | 1 |
| FRA | Quentin Halys | 200 | 2 |
| SUI | Marc-Andrea Hüsler | 218 | 3 |
| ARG | Francisco Cerúndolo | 237 | 4 |
| RUS | Evgeny Karlovskiy | 254 | 5 |
| ESP | Adrián Menéndez Maceiras | 262 | 6 |
| TUN | Malek Jaziri | 264 | 7 |
| JPN | Shuichi Sekiguchi | 274 | 8 |

- ^{1} Rankings are as of 14 September 2020.

=== Other entrants ===
The following players received wildcards into the singles main draw:

- (Romania) Victor Vlad Cornea
- (Romania) Dragoș Dima
- (Romania) Nicholas David Ionel

The following player received entry into the singles main draw using a protected ranking:

- (Spain) Íñigo Cervantes

The following player received entry into the singles main draw as an alternate:

- (Brazil) Felipe Meligeni Alves

The following players received entry from the qualifying draw:

- (Germany) Elmar Ejupovic
- (Spain) Carlos Gómez-Herrera
- (Turkey) Ergi Kırkın
- (France) Matthieu Perchicot

== Champions ==
=== Singles ===
- (Switzerland) Marc-Andrea Hüsler def. (Argentina) Tomás Martín Etcheverry 7–5, 6–0.

=== Doubles ===
- (United States) Hunter Reese / (Poland) Jan Zieliński def. (United States) Robert Galloway / (Mexico) Hans Hach Verdugo 6–4, 6–2.
