= 2017 Sibiu Open – Doubles =

Doubles
- 2017 Sibiu Open

Final
- Champions: (Italy) Marco Cecchinato (Italy) Matteo Donati
- Runners-up: (Belgium) Sander Gillé (Belgium) Joran Vliegen
- Score: 6–3, 6–1

Events
| Singles | Doubles |
- Sibiu Open

Robin Haase and Tim Pütz were the defending champions but chose not to defend their title.

Marco Cecchinato and Matteo Donati won the title after defeating Sander Gillé and Joran Vliegen 6–3, 6–1 in the final.

== Seeds ==
1. (Netherlands) Sander Arends / (Croatia) Antonio Šančić (first round)
2. (Belgium) Sander Gillé / (Belgium) Joran Vliegen (final)
3. (Germany) Alexander Satschko / (Austria) Tristan-Samuel Weissborn (first round)
4. (Italy) Alessandro Motti / (Spain) David Vega Hernández (quarterfinals)

== Draw ==
Key

- Q = Qualifier
- WC = Wild card
- LL = Lucky loser
- Alt = Alternate
- ITF = ITF entry
- PR = Protected ranking
- SR = Special ranking
- SE = Special exempt
- JE = Junior exempt
- JR = Junior Accelerator Programme entrant
- CO = College Accelerator Programme entrant
- NG = Next Gen Accelerator Program entrant
- w/o = Walkover
- r = Retired
- d = Defaulted

First round
1 | (Netherlands) S Arends (Croatia) A Šančić | 6 | 5 | [6]
(Czech Republic) V Šafránek (Czech Republic) J Šátral | 3 | 7 | [10]
Alt | (Italy) Erik Crepaldi (Ukraine) D Kalenichenko | 5 | 6 | [5]
WC | (Romania) V Antonescu (Romania) P Grigoriu | 7 | 4 | [10]
3 | (Germany) A Satschko (Austria) T-S Weissborn | 5 | 6 | [10]
(Italy) L Giustino (Bulgaria) A Lazov | 7 | 3 | [12]
(Italy) R Bellotti (Austria) Lenny Hampel | 2 | 0
(Italy) M Cecchinato (Italy) M Donati | 6 | 6
WC | (Poland) Michał Dembek (Romania) Vlad Andrei Dumitru | 3 | 0
(Uruguay) A Behar (United States) B Fratangelo | 6 | 6
(Spain) Í Cervantes (Italy) S Napolitano | 6^{6} | 6 | [7]
4 | (Italy) A Motti (Spain) D Vega Hernández | 7^{8} | 2 | [10]
(Romania) VV Cornea (Croatia) N Serdarušić | 6^{5} | 7^{7} | [10]
WC | (Romania) Adrian Barbu (Romania) A Ungur | 7^{7} | 6^{2} | [8]
(Portugal) G Oliveira (Italy) S Travaglia | 4 | 7^{12} | [6]
2 | (Belgium) S Gillé (Belgium) J Vliegen | 6 | 6^{10} | [10]

Quarterfinals
(Czech Republic) V Šafránek (Czech Republic) J Šátral
WC | (Romania) V Antonescu (Romania) P Grigoriu | w/o
(Italy) L Giustino (Bulgaria) A Lazov | 2 | 6^{2}
(Italy) M Cecchinato (Italy) M Donati | 6 | 7^{7}
(Uruguay) A Behar (United States) B Fratangelo | 5 | 6 | [10]
4 | (Italy) A Motti (Spain) D Vega Hernández | 7 | 3 | [7]
(Romania) VV Cornea (Croatia) N Serdarušić | 3 | 6^{1}
2 | (Belgium) S Gillé (Belgium) J Vliegen | 6 | 7^{7}

Semifinals
WC | (Romania) V Antonescu (Romania) P Grigoriu | 3 | 6^{4}
(Italy) M Cecchinato (Italy) M Donati | 6 | 7^{7}
(Uruguay) A Behar (United States) B Fratangelo | 3 | 4
2 | (Belgium) S Gillé (Belgium) J Vliegen | 6 | 6

Final
(Italy) M Cecchinato (Italy) M Donati | 6 | 6
2 | (Belgium) S Gillé (Belgium) J Vliegen | 3 | 1
