= 2023 Sibiu Open – Doubles =

Doubles
- 2023 Sibiu Open

Final
- Champions: (Czech Republic) Andrew Paulson (Czech Republic) Michael Vrbenský
- Runners-up: (Poland) Piotr Matuszewski (Germany) Kai Wehnelt
- Score: 6–2, 6–2

Events
Singles	Doubles
- Sibiu Open

Ivan and Matej Sabanov were the defending champions but chose not to defend their title.

Andrew Paulson and Michael Vrbenský won the title after defeating Piotr Matuszewski and Kai Wehnelt 6–2, 6–2 in the final.

== Seeds ==
1. (Poland) Piotr Matuszewski / (Germany) Kai Wehnelt (final)
2. (India) Niki Kaliyanda Poonacha / (India) Divij Sharan (semifinals)
3. (Croatia) Zvonimir Babić / (Romania) Alexandru Jecan (quarterfinals)
4. (Czech Republic) Andrew Paulson / (Czech Republic) Michael Vrbenský (champions)

== Draw ==
Key

- Q = Qualifier
- WC = Wild card
- LL = Lucky loser
- Alt = Alternate
- ITF = ITF entry
- PR = Protected ranking
- SR = Special ranking
- SE = Special exempt
- JE = Junior exempt
- JR = Junior Accelerator Programme entrant
- CO = College Accelerator Programme entrant
- NG = Next Gen Accelerator Program entrant
- w/o = Walkover
- r = Retired
- d = Defaulted

First round
1	(Poland) P Matuszewski (Germany) K Wehnelt	6	6
(Tunisia) M Echargui (France) C Tabur	3	3
(Peru) A Merino (Germany) C Negritu	5	1
(Italy) S Travaglia (Italy) Alexander Weis	7	6
3	(Croatia) Z Babić (Romania) A Jecan	6	6
WC	(Romania) Robert Gabriel Ionescu (Romania) Marc Popescu	0	2
(Italy) G Ferrari (Ukraine) V Orlov	3	4
(France) G Blancaneaux (France) C Hemery	6	6
Alt	Denis Klok (Japan) Ryuki Matsuda	6	6
(Italy) R Bonadio (Italy) G Fonio	3	1
(Argentina) JP Paz (Romania) Dan Alexandru Tomescu	0	0
4	(Czech Republic) A Paulson (Czech Republic) M Vrbenský	6	6
(Italy) S Caruso (Italy) A Giannessi
2	(India) N Kaliyanda Poonacha (India) D Sharan	w/o

Quarterfinals
1	(Poland) P Matuszewski (Germany) K Wehnelt	6	7
(Italy) S Travaglia (Italy) A Weis	4	5
3	(Croatia) Z Babić (Romania) A Jecan	2	2
(France) G Blancaneaux (France) C Hemery	6	6
Alt	D Klok (Japan) R Matsuda	2	3
4	(Czech Republic) A Paulson (Czech Republic) M Vrbenský	6	6
WC	(Slovenia) B Artnak (Romania) Dragoș Nicolae Cazacu	7	4	[8]
2	(India) N Kaliyanda Poonacha (India) D Sharan	5	6	[10]

Semifinals
1	(Poland) P Matuszewski (Germany) K Wehnelt	7^{7}	7
(France) G Blancaneaux (France) C Hemery	6^{4}	5
4	(Czech Republic) A Paulson (Czech Republic) M Vrbenský	6	6
2	(India) N Kaliyanda Poonacha (India) D Sharan	2	4

Final
1	(Poland) P Matuszewski (Germany) K Wehnelt	2	2
4	(Czech Republic) A Paulson (Czech Republic) M Vrbenský	6	6
