= 2014 Sibiu Open – Doubles =

Doubles
- 2014 Sibiu Open

Final
- Champions: (Italy) Potito Starace (Romania) Adrian Ungur
- Runners-up: (Romania) Marius Copil (Romania) Alexandru-Daniel Carpen
- Score: 7–5, 6–2

Events
Singles	Doubles
← 2013 ·	Sibiu Open	· 2015 →

Rameez Junaid and Philipp Oswald were the defending champions, but both players chose not to participate.

Potito Starace and Adrian Ungur won the title, defeating Marius Copil and Alexandru-Daniel Carpen 7–5, 6–2 in the final.

== Seeds ==
1. (Italy) Potito Starace / (Romania) Adrian Ungur (champions)
2. (Moldova) Radu Albot / (Netherlands) Stephan Fransen (quarterfinals)
3. (Czech Republic) Roman Jebavý / (Czech Republic) Jaroslav Pospíšil (first round)
4. (France) Jonathan Eysseric / (Spain) Pere Riba (first round)

== Draw ==
=== Key ===
- Q = Qualifier
- WC = Wild card
- LL = Lucky loser
- Alt = Alternate
- SE = Special exempt
- PR = Protected ranking
- ITF = ITF entry
- JE = Junior exempt
- w/o = Walkover
- r = Retired
- d = Defaulted
- SR = Special ranking

=== Draw ===
First round
1	(Italy) P Starace (Romania) A Ungur	6	6^{8}	[10]
WC	(Romania) Lucian Gheorghe (Romania) Tudor Sulea	2	7^{10}	[2]
(Georgia (country)) N Basilashvili (Serbia) M Zekić	w/o
(Italy) M Cecchinato (Italy) F Cipolla
4	(France) J Eysseric (Spain) P Riba	5	1
(Poland) M Gawron (Poland) G Panfil	7	6
WC	(Romania) VV Cornea (Romania) V Crivoi	5	6	[8]
(Germany) A Mies (Germany) P Torebko	7	4	[10]
(Romania) Alexandru-Daniel Carpen (Romania) M Copil	6	6
WC	(Romania) Bogdan Ionuț Apostol (Romania) A Pătrui	1	1
(Romania) P Grigoriu (Romania) C Pavăl	6	3	[10]
3	(Czech Republic) R Jebavý (Czech Republic) J Pospíšil	1	6	[7]
(Bosnia and Herzegovina) T Brkić (Bosnia and Herzegovina) A Šetkić	3	3
(Australia) J Kubler (Serbia) D Petrović	6	6
(Slovakia) K Beck (Slovakia) I Zelenay	3	1
2	(Moldova) R Albot (Netherlands) S Fransen	6	6

Quarterfinals
1	(Italy) P Starace (Romania) A Ungur	1
(Georgia (country)) N Basilashvili (Serbia) M Zekić	1^{r}
(Poland) M Gawron (Poland) G Panfil	6	3	[10]
(Germany) A Mies (Germany) P Torebko	2	6	[3]
(Romania) A-D Carpen (Romania) M Copil	6	6
(Romania) P Grigoriu (Romania) C Pavăl	1	2
(Australia) J Kubler (Serbia) D Petrović	6	3	[10]
2	(Moldova) R Albot (Netherlands) S Fransen	3	6	[7]

Semifinals
1	(Italy) P Starace (Romania) A Ungur	6	6
(Poland) M Gawron (Poland) G Panfil	4	4
(Romania) A-D Carpen (Romania) M Copil	6	6
(Australia) J Kubler (Serbia) D Petrović	4	4

Final
1	(Italy) P Starace (Romania) A Ungur	7	6
(Romania) A-D Carpen (Romania) M Copil	5	2
