= 2018 Sibiu Open – Singles =

Singles
- 2018 Sibiu Open

Final
- Champion: (Romania) Dragoș Dima
- Runner-up: (Netherlands) Jelle Sels
- Score: 6–3, 6–2

Events
Singles	Doubles
- Sibiu Open

Cedrik-Marcel Stebe was the defending champion but chose not to defend his title.

Dragoș Dima won the title after defeating Jelle Sels 6–3, 6–2 in the final.

== Seeds ==
1. (Serbia) Laslo Đere (semifinals, retired)
2. (Austria) Dennis Novak (first round)
3. (Portugal) Pedro Sousa (quarterfinals)
4. (Italy) Simone Bolelli (second round)
5. (Australia) Marc Polmans (second round)
6. (Italy) Gianluigi Quinzi (first round, retired)
7. (Spain) Pedro Martínez (semifinals)
8. (Czech Republic) Lukáš Rosol (quarterfinals)

== Draw ==
Key

- Q = Qualifier
- WC = Wild card
- LL = Lucky loser
- Alt = Alternate
- ITF = ITF entry
- PR = Protected ranking
- SR = Special ranking
- SE = Special exempt
- JE = Junior exempt
- JR = Junior Accelerator Programme entrant
- CO = College Accelerator Programme entrant
- NG = Next Gen Accelerator Program entrant
- w/o = Walkover
- r = Retired
- d = Defaulted

=== Finals ===
Semifinals
1	(Serbia) Laslo Đere	1^{r}
Q	(Netherlands) Jelle Sels	0
7	(Spain) Pedro Martínez	4	2
WC	(Romania) Dragoș Dima	6	6

Final
Q	(Netherlands) Jelle Sels	3	2
WC	(Romania) Dragoș Dima	6	6

=== Top half ===
First round
1	(Serbia) L Đere	7^{9}	7
(Bulgaria) D Kuzmanov	6^{7}	5
Alt	(Bosnia and Herzegovina) A Šetkić	5	2
(Germany) K Krawietz	7	6
(Italy) M Viola	2	7^{7}	1
(Croatia) N Serdarušić	6	6^{0}	6
(Portugal) G Oliveira	6^{6}	3
8	(Czech Republic) L Rosol	7^{8}	6
4	(Italy) S Bolelli	6	6
Q	(Germany) Jeremy Jahn	4	4
Q	(Netherlands) J Sels	7^{7}	6
(Spain) C Gómez-Herrera	6^{4}	3
WC	(Poland) Michał Dembek	5	3
(Czech Republic) Z Kolář	7	6
LL	(Spain) J Barranco Cosano	7^{7}	0
6	(Italy) G Quinzi	6^{3}	0^{r}

Second round
1	(Serbia) L Đere	4	6	6
(Germany) K Krawietz	6	2	2
(Croatia) N Serdarušić	1^{r}
8	(Czech Republic) L Rosol	2
4	(Italy) S Bolelli	6^{2}	3
Q	(Netherlands) J Sels	7^{7}	6
(Czech Republic) Z Kolář	4	4
LL	(Spain) J Barranco Cosano	6	6

Quarterfinals
1	(Serbia) L Đere	3	6	6
8	(Czech Republic) L Rosol	6	4	0
Q	(Netherlands) J Sels	3	6	6
LL	(Spain) J Barranco Cosano	6	2	4

Semifinals
1	(Serbia) L Đere	1^{r}
Q	(Netherlands) J Sels	0

=== Bottom half ===
First round
7	(Spain) P Martínez	7^{7}	0
Q	(Romania) N Frunză	6^{5}	0^{r}
Q	(Italy) Fabrizio Ornago	3	6	7^{7}
WC	(Romania) A Ungur	6	3	6^{2}
(Slovakia) F Horanský	6	5	4
(Belgium) K Coppejans	2	7	6
(India) S Nagal	2	4
3	(Portugal) P Sousa	6	6
5	(Australia) M Polmans	7	2	6
(Austria) S Ofner	5	6	3
(Poland) K Majchrzak	3
(Italy) G Mager	0^{r}
WC	(Romania) VV Cornea	3	6	0
(Portugal) J Domingues	6	3	6
WC	(Romania) D Dima	6	6
2	(Austria) D Novak	2	1

Second round
7	(Spain) P Martínez	6	6
Q	(Italy) F Ornago	4	4
(Belgium) K Coppejans	2	4
3	(Portugal) P Sousa	6	6
5	(Australia) M Polmans	3	4
(Poland) K Majchrzak	6	6
(Portugal) J Domingues	6	6^{7}	4
WC	(Romania) D Dima	3	7^{9}	6

Quarterfinals
7	(Spain) P Martínez	6	6^{2}	6
3	(Portugal) P Sousa	4	7^{7}	2
(Poland) K Majchrzak	6	6^{5}	3
WC	(Romania) D Dima	0	7^{7}	6

Semifinals
7	(Spain) P Martínez	4	2
WC	(Romania) D Dima	6	6
