= 2014 Sibiu Open – Singles =

Singles
- 2014 Sibiu Open

Final
- Champion: (Australia) Jason Kubler
- Runner-up: (Moldova) Radu Albot
- Score: 6–4, 6–1

Events
Singles	Doubles
← 2013 ·	Sibiu Open	· 2015 →

Jaroslav Pospíšil was the defending champion, but lost in the second round to Potito Starace.

Jason Kubler won the title by defeating Radu Albot 6–4, 6–1 in the final.

== Seeds ==
1. (Slovenia) Blaž Rola (first round)
2. (Spain) Albert Montañés (second round)
3. (Spain) Pere Riba (semifinals, retired)
4. (Romania) Adrian Ungur (second round)
5. (Romania) Victor Hănescu (first round)
6. (Hungary) Márton Fucsovics (first round, retired)
7. (Italy) Potito Starace (semifinals)
8. (Italy) Marco Cecchinato (second round)

== Draw ==
=== Key ===
- Q = Qualifier
- WC = Wild card
- LL = Lucky loser
- Alt = Alternate
- SE = Special exempt
- PR = Protected ranking
- ITF = ITF entry
- JE = Junior exempt
- w/o = Walkover
- r = Retired
- d = Defaulted
- SR = Special ranking

=== Finals ===
Semifinals
(Moldova) Radu Albot	7	3
3	(Spain) Pere Riba	6^{3}	1^{r}
7	(Italy) Potito Starace	6	6^{3}	0
(Australia) Jason Kubler	2	7^{7}	6

Final
(Moldova) Radu Albot	4	1
(Australia) Jason Kubler	6	6

=== Top half ===
First round
1	(Slovenia) B Rola	3	6^{1}
(Moldova) R Albot	6	7^{7}
WC	(Romania) Tudor Sulea	6^{4}	4
Q	(Poland) G Panfil	7^{7}	6
(Germany) P Torebko	6	7^{7}
WC	(Romania) VV Cornea	1	6^{3}
(Romania) V Crivoi	6	6
5	(Romania) V Hănescu	2	4
3	(Spain) P Riba	7	6
Q	(Austria) M Linzer	5	0
(Italy) F Volandri	6	6
WC	(Romania) Bogdan Ionuț Apostol	2	1
(Georgia (country)) N Basilashvili	5	2
(Italy) F Cipolla	7	6
(Bosnia and Herzegovina) A Šetkić	2	4
8	(Italy) M Cecchinato	6	6

Second round
(Moldova) R Albot	6^{4}	7	6
Q	(Poland) G Panfil	7^{7}	5	1
(Germany) P Torebko	4	4
(Romania) V Crivoi	6	6
3	(Spain) P Riba	3	6	6
(Italy) F Volandri	6	1	3
(Italy) F Cipolla	2	7	6
8	(Italy) M Cecchinato	6	5	0

Quarterfinals
(Moldova) R Albot	6	6
(Romania) V Crivoi	1	2
3	(Spain) P Riba	6	6
(Italy) F Cipolla	4	2

Semifinals
(Moldova) R Albot	7^{7}	3
3	(Spain) P Riba	6^{3}	1^{r}

=== Bottom half ===
First round
7	(Italy) P Starace	6	6
WC	(Romania) Lucian Gheorghe	1	1
(Czech Republic) J Pospíšil	6	6
(Romania) M Copil	3	2
(Bosnia and Herzegovina) T Brkić	3	6	6
(Ukraine) A Smirnov	6	2	3
(Italy) A Arnaboldi	2	2
4	(Romania) A Ungur	6	6
6	(Hungary) M Fucsovics	0^{r}
(Slovakia) J Kovalík	3
(Croatia) A Veić	4	2
Q	(Serbia) M Zekić	6	6
(Australia) J Kubler	6	6
Q	(Slovakia) M Semjan	2	4
(France) J Eysseric	2	4
2	(Spain) A Montañés	6	6

Second round
7	(Italy) P Starace	2	7^{7}	6
(Czech Republic) J Pospíšil	6	6^{3}	1
(Bosnia and Herzegovina) T Brkić	6	6
4	(Romania) A Ungur	3	3
(Slovakia) J Kovalík	6	6
Q	(Serbia) M Zekić	1	4
(Australia) J Kubler	6	6
2	(Spain) A Montañés	3	1

Quarterfinals
7	(Italy) P Starace	6	2	6
(Bosnia and Herzegovina) T Brkić	1	6	3
(Slovakia) J Kovalík	6^{4}	5
(Australia) J Kubler	7^{7}	7

Semifinals
7	(Italy) P Starace	6	6^{3}	0
(Australia) J Kubler	2	7^{7}	6
