= 2017 Sibiu Open =

- Date: 18–24 September
- Edition: 6th
- Location: Sibiu, Romania

Champions

Singles
- (Germany) Cedrik-Marcel Stebe

Doubles
- (Italy) Marco Cecchinato / (Italy) Matteo Donati
← 2016 ·	Sibiu Open	· 2018 →

The 2017 Sibiu Open was a professional tennis tournament played on clay courts. It was the sixth edition of the tournament which was part of the 2017 ATP Challenger Tour. It took place in Sibiu, Romania between 18 and 24 September 2017.

== Singles main-draw entrants ==
=== Seeds ===
Country	Player	Rank^{1}	Seed
GER	Cedrik-Marcel Stebe	90	1
SRB	Laslo Đere	95	2
ITA	Marco Cecchinato	99	3
ESP	Roberto Carballés Baena	106	4
GER	Maximilian Marterer	121	5
USA	Bjorn Fratangelo	124	6
ITA	Stefano Travaglia	125	7
JPN	Taro Daniel	129	8

- ^{1} Rankings are as of 11 September 2017.

=== Other entrants ===
The following players received wildcards into the singles main draw:

- (Romania) Vlad Andrei Dancu
- (Poland) Michał Dembek
- (Croatia) Nino Serdarušić
- (Romania) Adrian Ungur

The following players received entry from the qualifying draw:

- (Italy) Matteo Donati
- (Austria) Lenny Hampel
- (Bulgaria) Alexandar Lazov
- (France) Alexandre Müller

The following player received entry as a lucky loser:

- (Bulgaria) Dimitar Kuzmanov

== Champions ==
=== Singles ===
- (Germany) Cedrik-Marcel Stebe def. (Spain) Carlos Taberner 6–3, 6–3.

=== Doubles ===
- (Italy) Marco Cecchinato / (Italy) Matteo Donati def. (Belgium) Sander Gillé / (Belgium) Joran Vliegen 6–3, 6–1.
