= 2019 Sibiu Open =

- Date: 16–22 September
- Edition: 8th
- Location: Sibiu, Romania

Champions

Singles
- (Serbia) Danilo Petrović

Doubles
- (France) Sadio Doumbia / (France) Fabien Reboul
← 2018 ·	Sibiu Open	· 2020 →

The 2019 Sibiu Open was a professional tennis tournament played on clay courts. It was the eighth edition of the tournament which was part of the 2019 ATP Challenger Tour. It took place in Sibiu, Romania between 16 and 22 September 2019.

== Singles main-draw entrants ==
=== Seeds ===
Country	Player	Rank^{1}	Seed
POR	Pedro Sousa	123	1
SLO	Blaž Rola	133	2
~~HUN~~	~~Attila Balázs~~	~~136~~	~~3~~
ESP	Pedro Martínez	149	4
SRB	Nikola Milojević	151	5
ARG	Federico Coria	155	6
NED	Robin Haase	156	7
GER	Rudolf Molleker	157	8
POR	João Domingues	179	9
ARG	Facundo Argüello	181	10
NED	Tallon Griekspoor	187	11
SVK	Filip Horanský	189	12
KAZ	Dmitry Popko	216	13
AUS	Christopher O'Connell	223	14
SRB	Peđa Krstin	224	15
ESP	Bernabé Zapata Miralles	236	16

- ^{1} Rankings are as of 9 September 2019.

=== Other entrants ===
The following players received wildcards into the singles main draw:

- (Switzerland) Adrian Bodmer
- (Romania) Victor Vlad Cornea
- (Poland) Michał Dembek
- (Romania) Alexandru Jecan
- (Romania) Filip Cristian Jianu

The following players received entry into the singles main draw as alternates:

- (Czech Republic) Pavel Nejedlý
- (Czech Republic) Petr Nouza
- (France) Fabien Reboul

The following players received entry from the qualifying draw:

- (Czech Republic) Jaroslav Pospíšil
- (Croatia) Matej Sabanov

The following player received entry as a lucky loser:

- (Spain) Sergio Martos Gornés

== Champions ==
=== Singles ===
- (Serbia) Danilo Petrović def. (Australia) Christopher O'Connell 6–4, 6–2.

=== Doubles ===
- (France) Sadio Doumbia / (France) Fabien Reboul def. (Croatia) Ivan Sabanov / (Croatia) Matej Sabanov 6–4, 3–6, [10–7].
