= 2012 BRD Sibiu Challenger – Doubles =

Doubles
- 2012 BRD Sibiu Challenger

Final
- Champion: (Croatia) Marin Draganja (Croatia) Lovro Zovko
- Runner-up: (Romania) Alexandru-Daniel Carpen (Chile) Cristóbal Saavedra-Corvalán
- Score: 6–4, 4–6, [11–9]

Events
Singles	Doubles
← 2011 ·	BRD Sibiu Challenger	· 2013 →

Marin Draganja and Lovro Zovko won the title, defeating Alexandru-Daniel Carpen and Cristóbal Saavedra-Corvalán 6–4, 4–6, [11–9] in the final.

== Seeds ==
1. (Germany) Philipp Marx / (Romania) Florin Mergea (quarterfinals)
2. (Croatia) Marin Draganja / (Croatia) Lovro Zovko (champions)
3. (Montenegro) Goran Tošić / (United States) Denis Zivkovic (quarterfinals)
4. (Spain) Iñigo Cervantes / (Spain) Gerard Granollers (semifinals)

== Draw ==
=== Key ===
- Q = Qualifier
- WC = Wild card
- LL = Lucky loser
- Alt = Alternate
- ITF = ITF entry
- PR = Protected ranking
- SR = Special ranking
- SE = Special exempt
- JE = Junior exempt
- JR = Junior Accelerator Programme entrant
- CO = College Accelerator Programme entrant
- NG = Next Gen Accelerator Program entrant
- w/o = Walkover
- r = Retired
- d = Defaulted

=== Draw ===
First round
1	(Germany) P Marx (Romania) F Mergea	6	6
WC	(Romania) VV Cornea (Romania) Lucian Gheorghe	2	4
(Romania) Alexandru-Daniel Carpen (Chile) C Saavedra-Corvalán	6	6
WC	(Romania) Vlad Dobre (Romania) Rareș Ispas	1	1
3	(Montenegro) G Tošić (United States) D Zivkovic	6	6
(France) D Guez (France) N Renavand	3	1
(Romania) A Dăescu (Romania) P-A Luncanu	1	2
(Italy) A Giannessi (Portugal) J Sousa	6	6
(Ukraine) Vadim Alekseenko (Italy) Erik Crepaldi	4	6	[6]
(Romania) T-D Crăciun (Brazil) A Ghem	6	4	[10]
(Moldova) R Albot (Croatia) T Androić	6^{3}	6	[7]
4	(Spain) I Cervantes (Spain) G Granollers	7^{7}	4	[10]
(Italy) A Arnaboldi (Italy) S Vagnozzi	2	6	[10]
(Romania) Sebastian Kraila (Romania) R Sabău	6	4	[5]
(Spain) G Olaso (Spain) J Samper-Montaña	3	5
2	(Croatia) M Draganja (Croatia) L Zovko	6	7

Quarterfinals
1	(Germany) P Marx (Romania) F Mergea	6	2	[6]
(Romania) A-D Carpen (Chile) C Saavedra-Corvalán	3	6	[10]
3	(Montenegro) G Tošić (United States) D Zivkovic	5	5
(Italy) A Giannessi (Portugal) J Sousa	7	7
(Romania) T-D Crăciun (Brazil) A Ghem	2	3
4	(Spain) I Cervantes (Spain) G Granollers	6	6
(Italy) A Arnaboldi (Italy) S Vagnozzi	2	5
2	(Croatia) M Draganja (Croatia) L Zovko	6	7

Semifinals
(Romania) A-D Carpen (Chile) C Saavedra-Corvalán	6	6
(Italy) A Giannessi (Portugal) J Sousa	3	4
4	(Spain) I Cervantes (Spain) G Granollers	2	1
2	(Croatia) M Draganja (Croatia) L Zovko	6	6

Final
(Romania) A-D Carpen (Chile) C Saavedra-Corvalán	4	6	[9]
2	(Croatia) M Draganja (Croatia) L Zovko	6	4	[11]
