= 2022 Sibiu Open – Singles =

Singles
- 2022 Sibiu Open

Final
- Champion: (Bosnia and Herzegovina) Nerman Fatić
- Runner-up: (Bosnia and Herzegovina) Damir Džumhur
- Score: 6–3, 6–4

Events
Singles	Doubles
- Sibiu Open

Stefano Travaglia was the defending champion but chose not to defend his title.

Nerman Fatić won the title after defeating Damir Džumhur 6–3, 6–4 in the final.

== Seeds ==
1. (Argentina) Federico Coria (semifinals)
2. (Austria) Filip Misolic (quarterfinals)
3. (Czech Republic) Zdeněk Kolář (second round)
4. (Argentina) Thiago Agustín Tirante (first round)
5. (Italy) Riccardo Bonadio (first round)
6. (Bosnia and Herzegovina) Damir Džumhur (final)
7. (Belgium) Kimmer Coppejans (first round)
8. (Serbia) Nikola Milojević (second round)

== Draw ==
Key

- Q = Qualifier
- WC = Wild card
- LL = Lucky loser
- Alt = Alternate
- ITF = ITF entry
- PR = Protected ranking
- SR = Special ranking
- SE = Special exempt
- JE = Junior exempt
- JR = Junior Accelerator Programme entrant
- CO = College Accelerator Programme entrant
- NG = Next Gen Accelerator Program entrant
- w/o = Walkover
- r = Retired
- d = Defaulted

=== Finals ===
Semifinals
1	(Argentina) Federico Coria	6	4	3
(Bosnia and Herzegovina) Nerman Fatić	4	6	6
6	(Bosnia and Herzegovina) Damir Džumhur	0	7^{8}	6
(Romania) Nicholas David Ionel	6	6^{6}	3

Final
(Bosnia and Herzegovina) Nerman Fatić	6	6
6	(Bosnia and Herzegovina) Damir Džumhur	3	4

=== Top half ===
First round
1	(Argentina) F Coria	6	6
(India) R Ramanathan	2	1
Q	(Canada) S Diez	6	6
(Bosnia and Herzegovina) M Bašić	1	3
(Hungary) M Valkusz	7^{7}	7^{7}
WC	(Romania) M Copil	6^{3}	6^{4}
(France) L Van Assche	5	6	2
8	(Serbia) N Milojević	7	1	6
4	(Argentina) TA Tirante	7^{7}	5	1
Q	I Gakhov	6^{5}	7	6
(Sweden) DN Mădăraș	1	4
Q	(Italy) G Fonio	6	6
(Germany) L Wessels	4	6	6
(Italy) M Bellucci	6	3	4
(Bosnia and Herzegovina) N Fatić	6	6
5	(Italy) R Bonadio	3	3

Second round
1	(Argentina) F Coria	7^{7}	6
Q	(Canada) S Diez	6^{4}	4
(Hungary) M Valkusz	6	6
8	(Serbia) N Milojević	1	2
Q	I Gakhov	6	6
Q	(Italy) G Fonio	4	2
(Germany) L Wessels	3	6^{4}
(Bosnia and Herzegovina) N Fatić	6	7^{7}

Quarterfinals
1	(Argentina) F Coria	3
(Hungary) M Valkusz	0^{r}
Q	I Gakhov	4	0
(Bosnia and Herzegovina) N Fatić	6	6

Semifinals
1	(Argentina) F Coria	6	4	3
(Bosnia and Herzegovina) N Fatić	4	6	6

=== Bottom half ===
First round
6	(Bosnia and Herzegovina) D Džumhur	6	6
(Slovakia) F Horanský	3	2
Q	(Germany) K Wehnelt	4	5
(Switzerland) J Nikles	6	7
WC	(Romania) VV Cornea	2	5
(Slovakia) L Klein	6	7
WC	(Romania) D Dima	2	3
3	(Czech Republic) Z Kolář	6	6
7	(Belgium) K Coppejans	3	1
(Romania) ND Ionel	6	6
Q	(Ukraine) G Kravchenko	6	1	6^{3}
(Romania) FC Jianu	2	6	7^{7}
Q	(Germany) R Molleker	6	6
(United Kingdom) B Harris	4	2
PR	(United Kingdom) J Choinski	3	6	2
2	(Austria) F Misolic	6	3	6

Second round
6	(Bosnia and Herzegovina) D Džumhur	6	6
(Switzerland) J Nikles	4	3
(Slovakia) L Klein	7	6
3	(Czech Republic) Z Kolář	5	3
(Romania) ND Ionel	3	6	2
(Romania) FC Jianu	6	4	0^{r}
Q	(Germany) R Molleker	3	6	3
2	(Austria) F Misolic	6	3	6

Quarterfinals
6	(Bosnia and Herzegovina) D Džumhur	7^{11}	6
(Slovakia) L Klein	6^{9}	1
(Romania) ND Ionel	6	6
2	(Austria) F Misolic	2	3

Semifinals
6	(Bosnia and Herzegovina) D Džumhur	0	7^{8}	6
(Romania) ND Ionel	6	6^{6}	3
