= 2012 BRD Sibiu Challenger =

- Date: 6–12 August
- Edition: 1st
- Location: Sibiu, Romania

Champions

Singles
- (Romania) Adrian Ungur

Doubles
- (Croatia) Marin Draganja / (Croatia) Lovro Zovko
- BRD Sibiu Challenger

The 2012 BRD Sibiu Challenger was a professional tennis tournament played on clay courts. It was the 1st edition of the tournament which was part of the 2012 ATP Challenger Tour. It takes place in Sibiu, Romania between 6 and 12 August 2012.

== Singles main draw entrants ==
=== Seeds ===
Country	Player	Rank^{1}	Seed
ROU	Adrian Ungur	106	1
ROU	Victor Hănescu	115	2
POR	João Sousa	127	3
ITA	Alessandro Giannessi	139	4
ESP	Iñigo Cervantes	147	5
AUT	Andreas Haider-Maurer	162	6
NED	Thiemo de Bakker	195	7
MDA	Radu Albot	216	8

- ^{1} Rankings are as of August 1, 2012.

=== Other entrants ===
The following players received wildcards into the singles main draw:

- (Romania) Victor Vlad Cornea
- (Romania) Lucian Gheorghe
- (Romania) Petru-Alexandru Luncanu
- (Romania) Florin Mergea

The following players received entry from the qualifying draw:

- (Croatia) Toni Androić
- (Brazil) André Ghem
- (Romania) Vasile-Alexandru Ghilea
- (Montenegro) Goran Tošić

== Champions ==
=== Singles ===
(Romania) Adrian Ungur def. (Romania) Victor Hănescu, 6–4, 7–6^{(7–1)}

=== Doubles ===
(Croatia) Marin Draganja / (Croatia) Lovro Zovko def. (Romania) Alexandru-Daniel Carpen / (Chile) Cristóbal Saavedra-Corvalán, 6–4, 4–6, [11–9]
