= 2023 Sibiu Open =

- Date: 18–24 September
- Edition: 12th
- Location: Sibiu, Romania

Champions

Singles
- (Bosnia and Herzegovina) Nerman Fatić

Doubles
- (Czech Republic) Andrew Paulson / (Czech Republic) Michael Vrbenský
- Sibiu Open

The 2023 Sibiu Open was a professional tennis tournament played on clay courts. It was the 12th edition of the tournament which was part of the 2023 ATP Challenger Tour. It took place in Sibiu, Romania between 18 and 24 September 2023.

== Singles main-draw entrants ==
=== Seeds ===
Country	Player	Rank^{1}	Seed
HUN	Zsombor Piros	111	1
ITA	Flavio Cobolli	132	2
BIH	Damir Džumhur	157	3
	Ivan Gakhov	161	4
ITA	Stefano Travaglia	205	5
CRO	Duje Ajduković	206	6
ITA	Alessandro Giannessi	214	7
BIH	Nerman Fatić	218	8

- ^{1} Rankings are as of 11 September 2023.

=== Other entrants ===
The following players received wildcards into the singles main draw:

- (Slovenia) Bor Artnak
- (Romania) Cezar Crețu
- (Romania) Sebastian Gima

The following players received entry from the qualifying draw:

- (Romania) Vlad Andrei Dancu
- (France) Calvin Hemery
- (Romania) Filip Cristian Jianu
- (Switzerland) Henri Laaksonen
- (Czech Republic) Andrew Paulson
- (Czech Republic) Michael Vrbenský

== Champions ==
=== Singles ===
- (Bosnia and Herzegovina) Nerman Fatić def. (Bosnia and Herzegovina) Damir Džumhur 6–2, 6–4.

=== Doubles ===
- (Czech Republic) Andrew Paulson / (Czech Republic) Michael Vrbenský def. (Poland) Piotr Matuszewski / (Germany) Kai Wehnelt 6–2, 6–2.
