= 2022 Sibiu Open =

- Date: 19–25 September
- Edition: 11th
- Location: Sibiu, Romania

Champions

Singles
- (Bosnia and Herzegovina) Nerman Fatić

Doubles
- (Serbia) Ivan Sabanov / (Serbia) Matej Sabanov
- Sibiu Open

The 2022 Sibiu Open was a professional tennis tournament played on clay courts. It was the eleventh edition of the tournament which was part of the 2022 ATP Challenger Tour. It took place in Sibiu, Romania between 19 and 25 September 2022.

== Singles main-draw entrants ==
=== Seeds ===
Country	Player	Rank^{1}	Seed
ARG	Federico Coria	71	1
AUT	Filip Misolic	145	2
CZE	Zdeněk Kolář	156	3
ARG	Thiago Agustín Tirante	171	4
ITA	Riccardo Bonadio	174	5
BIH	Damir Džumhur	193	6
BEL	Kimmer Coppejans	200	7
SRB	Nikola Milojević	207	8

- ^{1} Rankings are as of 12 September 2022.

=== Other entrants ===
The following players received wildcards into the singles main draw:

- (Romania) Marius Copil
- (Romania) Victor Vlad Cornea
- (Romania) Dragoș Dima

The following player received entry into the singles main draw using a protected ranking:

- (United Kingdom) Jan Choinski

The following players received entry from the qualifying draw:

- (Canada) Steven Diez
- (Italy) Giovanni Fonio
- Ivan Gakhov
- (Ukraine) Georgii Kravchenko
- (Germany) Rudolf Molleker
- (Germany) Kai Wehnelt

== Champions ==
=== Singles ===
- (Bosnia and Herzegovina) Nerman Fatić def. (Bosnia and Herzegovina) Damir Džumhur 6–3, 6–4.

=== Doubles ===
- (Serbia) Ivan Sabanov / (Serbia) Matej Sabanov def. (Austria) Alexander Erler / (Austria) Lucas Miedler 3–6, 7–5, [10–4].
