= 2021 Sibiu Open – Doubles =

Doubles
- 2021 Sibiu Open

Final
- Champions: (Austria) Alexander Erler (Austria) Lucas Miedler
- Runners-up: (United States) James Cerretani (Switzerland) Luca Margaroli
- Score: 6–3, 6–1

Events
Singles	Doubles
- Sibiu Open

Hunter Reese and Jan Zieliński were the defending champions but chose not to defend their title.

Alexander Erler and Lucas Miedler won the title after defeating James Cerretani and Luca Margaroli 6–3, 6–1 in the final.

== Seeds ==
1. (United States) James Cerretani / (Switzerland) Luca Margaroli (final)
2. (Austria) Alexander Erler / (Austria) Lucas Miedler (champions)
3. (Philippines) Ruben Gonzales / (United States) Hunter Johnson (semifinals)
4. (Romania) Victor Vlad Cornea / (Greece) Petros Tsitsipas (quarterfinals)

== Draw ==
Key

- Q = Qualifier
- WC = Wild card
- LL = Lucky loser
- Alt = Alternate
- ITF = ITF entry
- PR = Protected ranking
- SR = Special ranking
- SE = Special exempt
- JE = Junior exempt
- JR = Junior Accelerator Programme entrant
- CO = College Accelerator Programme entrant
- NG = Next Gen Accelerator Program entrant
- w/o = Walkover
- r = Retired
- d = Defaulted

First round
1	(United States) J Cerretani (Switzerland) L Margaroli	4
(Germany) Elmar Ejupovic (Turkey) E Kırkın	2^{r}
(Ukraine) O Krutykh (Czech Republic) D Poljak	w/o
(Russia) A Vatutin (Germany) K Wehnelt
4	(Romania) VV Cornea (Greece) Pe Tsitsipas	w/o
(Belarus) U Ignatik (Romania) ND Ionel
(Russia) Yan Bondarevskiy (Ukraine) O Prihodko	7^{9}	5	[9]
(France) G Blancaneaux (India) A Kadhe	6^{7}	7	[11]
(Sweden) DN Mădăraș (Serbia) D Petrović
(Moldova) R Albot (Romania) M Copil	w/o
(Romania) A Jecan (Romania) FC Jianu	5	2
3	(Philippines) R Gonzales (United States) H Johnson	7	6
WC	(Romania) Vlad Andrei Dancu (Romania) Sebastian Gima	7^{7}	2	[10]
WC	(Romania) Bogdan Ionuț Apostol (Romania) N Frunză	6^{2}	6	[7]
WC	(Romania) Ștefan Paloși (Romania) Marc Popescu	0	3
2	(Austria) A Erler (Austria) L Miedler	6	6

Quarterfinals
1	(United States) J Cerretani (Switzerland) L Margaroli	3	6	[10]
(Ukraine) O Krutykh (Czech Republic) D Poljak	6	0	[6]
4	(Romania) VV Cornea (Greece) Pe Tsitsipas	5	2
(France) G Blancaneaux (India) A Kadhe	7	6
(Moldova) R Albot (Romania) M Copil	4	2
3	(Philippines) R Gonzales (United States) H Johnson	6	6
WC	(Romania) VA Dancu (Romania) S Gima	5	2
2	(Austria) A Erler (Austria) L Miedler	7	6

Semifinals
1	(United States) J Cerretani (Switzerland) L Margaroli	6	5	[10]
(France) G Blancaneaux (India) A Kadhe	4	7	[7]
3	(Philippines) R Gonzales (United States) H Johnson	3	5
2	(Austria) A Erler (Austria) L Miedler	6	7

Final
1	(United States) J Cerretani (Switzerland) L Margaroli	3	1
2	(Austria) A Erler (Austria) L Miedler	6	6
