= 2017 Sibiu Open – Singles =

Singles
- 2017 Sibiu Open

Final
- Champion: (Germany) Cedrik-Marcel Stebe
- Runner-up: (Spain) Carlos Taberner
- Score: 6–3, 6–3

Events
Singles	Doubles
- Sibiu Open

Robin Haase was the defending champion but chose not to defend his title.

Cedrik-Marcel Stebe won the title after defeating Carlos Taberner 6–3, 6–3 in the final.

== Seeds ==
1. (Germany) Cedrik-Marcel Stebe (champion)
2. (Serbia) Laslo Đere (first round)
3. (Italy) Marco Cecchinato (second round)
4. (Spain) Roberto Carballés Baena (second round)
5. (Germany) Maximilian Marterer (semifinals)
6. (United States) Bjorn Fratangelo (quarterfinals)
7. (Italy) Stefano Travaglia (quarterfinals)
8. (Japan) Taro Daniel (first round)

== Draw ==
Key

- Q = Qualifier
- WC = Wild card
- LL = Lucky loser
- Alt = Alternate
- ITF = ITF entry
- PR = Protected ranking
- SR = Special ranking
- SE = Special exempt
- JE = Junior exempt
- JR = Junior Accelerator Programme entrant
- CO = College Accelerator Programme entrant
- NG = Next Gen Accelerator Program entrant
- w/o = Walkover
- r = Retired
- d = Defaulted

=== Finals ===
Semifinals
1	(Germany) Cedrik-Marcel Stebe	6	6
5	(Germany) Maximilian Marterer	2	1
WC	(Romania) Adrian Ungur	3	0
(Spain) Carlos Taberner	6	6

Final
1	(Germany) Cedrik-Marcel Stebe	6	6
(Spain) Carlos Taberner	3	3

=== Top half ===
First round
1	(Germany) C-M Stebe	7^{7}	7^{7}
WC	(Romania) Vlad Andrei Dancu	6^{4}	6^{4}
(Spain) Í Cervantes	7^{7}	6
(Italy) A Arnaboldi	6^{2}	1
(Czech Republic) J Šátral	6	6
WC	(Croatia) N Serdarušić	4	2
(Italy) S Napolitano	6	1	6
8	(Japan) T Daniel	2	6	3
4	(Spain) R Carballés Baena	6	6
Q	(Bulgaria) A Lazov	3	4
(Czech Republic) V Šafránek	1	0^{r}
(Norway) C Ruud	6	3
Q	(Italy) M Donati	6	6
(Spain) T Robredo	1	4
(Lithuania) L Grigelis	1	1
5	(Germany) M Marterer	6	6

Second round
1	(Germany) C-M Stebe	2	7^{8}	6
(Spain) Í Cervantes	6	6^{6}	2
(Czech Republic) J Šátral	6	4	3
(Italy) S Napolitano	3	6	6
4	(Spain) R Carballés Baena	5	5
(Norway) C Ruud	7	7
Q	(Italy) M Donati	4	5
5	(Germany) M Marterer	6	7

Quarterfinals
1	(Germany) C-M Stebe	6	6
(Italy) S Napolitano	0	3
(Norway) C Ruud	6^{4}	3
5	(Germany) M Marterer	7^{7}	6

Semifinals
1	(Germany) C-M Stebe	6	6
5	(Germany) M Marterer	2	1

=== Bottom half ===
First round
7	(Italy) S Travaglia	6	6
(Italy) L Giustino	2	0
Q	(France) A Müller	1	5
LL	(Bulgaria) D Kuzmanov	6	7
(Spain) R Ojeda Lara	1	6	2
WC	(Romania) A Ungur	6	1	6
WC	(Poland) Michał Dembek	1	5
3	(Italy) M Cecchinato	6	7
6	(United States) B Fratangelo	2	6	7^{9}
(Germany) Jeremy Jahn	6	3	6^{7}
(Italy) R Bellotti	6	6
(Slovakia) M Kližan	3	1
(Portugal) G Oliveira	2	2
(Spain) C Taberner	6	6
Q	(Austria) Lenny Hampel	3	6	6
2	(Serbia) L Đere	6	4	1

Second round
7	(Italy) S Travaglia	6	6
LL	(Bulgaria) D Kuzmanov	2	0
WC	(Romania) A Ungur	7	6
3	(Italy) M Cecchinato	5	3
6	(United States) B Fratangelo	6	6
(Italy) R Bellotti	4	2
(Spain) C Taberner	6	6
Q	(Austria) L Hampel	1	2

Quarterfinals
7	(Italy) S Travaglia	3	1
WC	(Romania) A Ungur	6	6
6	(United States) B Fratangelo	3	6^{5}
(Spain) C Taberner	6	7^{7}

Semifinals
WC	(Romania) A Ungur	3	0
(Spain) C Taberner	6	6
