= 2013 Sibiu Open =

- Date: 23–29 September
- Edition: 2nd
- Location: Sibiu, Romania

Champions

Singles
- (Czech Republic) Jaroslav Pospíšil

Doubles
- (Australia) Rameez Junaid / (Austria) Philipp Oswald
- Sibiu Open

The 2013 Sibiu Open was a professional tennis tournament played on clay courts. It was the second edition of the tournament which was part of the 2013 ATP Challenger Tour. It takes place in Sibiu, Romania between 23 and 29 September 2013.

== Singles main draw entrants ==
=== Seeds ===
Country	Player	Rank^{1}	Seed
ITA	Filippo Volandri	91	1
CZE	Jan Hájek	103	2
GER	Julian Reister	107	3
AUT	Andreas Haider-Maurer	108	4
ROU	Adrian Ungur	117	5
SRB	Dušan Lajović	144	6
~~ESP~~	~~Pere Riba~~	~~156~~	~~7~~
ITA	Marco Cecchinato	185	8
NED	Thomas Schoorel	192	9

- ^{1} Rankings are as of September 16, 2013.

=== Other entrants ===
The following players received wildcards into the singles main draw:

- (Romania) Alexandru-Daniel Carpen
- (Romania) Rareș Ispas
- (Romania) Florin Mergea
- (Italy) Filippo Volandri

The following players received entry from the qualifying draw:

- (Croatia) Toni Androić
- (Croatia) Mate Delić
- (Romania) Răzvan Sabău
- (Germany) Richard Becker

The following players received entry as a lucky loser the singles main draw:

- (Bulgaria) Tihomir Grozdanov

== Champions ==
=== Singles ===
- (Czech Republic) Jaroslav Pospíšil def. (Italy) Marco Cecchinato 4–6, 6–4, 6–1

=== Doubles ===
- (Australia) Rameez Junaid / (Austria) Philipp Oswald def. (United Kingdom) Jamie Delgado / (Australia) Jordan Kerr 6–4, 6–4
