= 2024 Sibiu Open =

- Date: 16–22 September
- Edition: 13th
- Location: Sibiu, Romania

Champions

Singles
- (France) Valentin Royer

Doubles
- (Peru) Alexander Merino / (Germany) Christoph Negritu
- Sibiu Open

The 2024 Sibiu Open was a professional tennis tournament played on clay courts. It was the 13th edition of the tournament which was part of the 2024 ATP Challenger Tour. It took place in Sibiu, Romania between 16 and 22 September 2024.

== Singles main-draw entrants ==
=== Seeds ===
Country	Player	Rank^{1}	Seed
ITA	Stefano Travaglia	199	1
KAZ	Timofey Skatov	201	2
FRA	Valentin Royer	216	3
GER	Rudolf Molleker	248	4
CAN	Liam Draxl	259	5
ITA	Francesco Maestrelli	264	6
ITA	Enrico Dalla Valle	269	7
ROU	Cezar Crețu	292	8

- ^{1} Rankings are as of 9 September 2024.

=== Other entrants ===
The following players received wildcards into the singles main draw:

- (Italy) Jacopo Berrettini
- (Romania) Sebastian Gima
- (Spain) Jorge Plans

The following players received entry into the singles main draw as alternates:

- (Spain) Miguel Damas
- (France) Corentin Denolly

The following players received entry from the qualifying draw:

- (Czech Republic) Hynek Bartoň
- Artem Dubrivnyy
- (France) Arthur Géa
- (Germany) Christoph Negritu
- (Argentina) Genaro Alberto Olivieri
- (Romania) Ștefan Paloși

== Champions ==
=== Singles ===
- (France) Valentin Royer def. (France) Luka Pavlovic 6–4, 6–0.

=== Doubles ===
- (Peru) Alexander Merino / (Germany) Christoph Negritu def. (Canada) Liam Draxl / (Canada) Cleeve Harper 6–2, 7–6^{(7–2)}.
