= 2024 Sibiu Open – Singles =

Singles
- 2024 Sibiu Open

Final
- Champion: (France) Valentin Royer
- Runner-up: (France) Luka Pavlovic
- Score: 6–4, 6–0

Events
Singles	Doubles
- Sibiu Open

Nerman Fatić was the defending champion but chose not to defend his title.

Valentin Royer won the title after defeating Luka Pavlovic 6–4, 6–0 in the final.

== Seeds ==
1. (Italy) Stefano Travaglia (quarterfinals)
2. (Kazakhstan) Timofey Skatov (second round)
3. (France) Valentin Royer (champion)
4. (Germany) Rudolf Molleker (quarterfinals)
5. (Canada) Liam Draxl (second round)
6. (Italy) Francesco Maestrelli (first round)
7. (Italy) Enrico Dalla Valle (second round)
8. (Romania) Cezar Crețu (semifinals)

== Draw ==
Key

- Q = Qualifier
- WC = Wild card
- LL = Lucky loser
- Alt = Alternate
- ITF = ITF entry
- PR = Protected ranking
- SR = Special ranking
- SE = Special exempt
- JE = Junior exempt
- JR = Junior Accelerator Programme entrant
- CO = College Accelerator Programme entrant
- NG = Next Gen Accelerator Program entrant
- w/o = Walkover
- r = Retired
- d = Defaulted

=== Finals ===
Semifinals
8	(Romania) Cezar Crețu	4	6^{3}
(France) Luka Pavlovic	6	7^{7}
3	(France) Valentin Royer	6	7^{8}
Q	(Czech Republic) Hynek Bartoň	3	6^{6}

Final
(France) Luka Pavlovic	4	0
3	(France) Valentin Royer	6	6

=== Top half ===
First round
1	(Italy) S Travaglia	6	6
(Slovenia) Filip Jeff Planinšek	2	3
(Bulgaria) D Kuzmanov	6	6^{4}	5
Alt	(Spain) M Damas	2	7^{7}	7
(Norway) N Budkov Kjær	6	4	1
Q	A Dubrivnyy	4	6	6
(Spain) N Sánchez Izquierdo	4	6^{3}
8	(Romania) C Crețu	6	7^{7}
4	(Germany) R Molleker	6	6
Q	(Romania) Ștefan Paloși	4	2
(Italy) G Fonio	6	6
WC	(Romania) Sebastian Gima	2	2
(Portugal) G Elias	1^{r}
(France) L Pavlovic	1
Alt	(France) C Denolly	6	4	2
5	(Canada) L Draxl	3	6	6

Second round
1	(Italy) S Travaglia	6	6^{4}	6
Alt	(Spain) M Damas	3	7^{7}	4
Q	A Dubrivnyy	3	1
8	(Romania) C Crețu	6	6
4	(Germany) R Molleker	6	5	7^{7}
(Italy) G Fonio	3	7	6^{5}
(France) L Pavlovic	6	6
5	(Canada) L Draxl	2	3

Quarterfinals
1	(Italy) S Travaglia	3	4
8	(Romania) C Crețu	6	6
4	(Germany) R Molleker	5	3
(France) L Pavlovic	7	6

Semifinals
8	(Romania) C Crețu	4	6^{3}
(France) L Pavlovic	6	7^{7}

=== Bottom half ===
First round
7	(Italy) E Dalla Valle	6	6
(Italy) L Giustino	4	1
Q	(Argentina) GA Olivieri	6	5	6
I Gakhov	2	7	4
(Netherlands) J Sels	4	2
Q	(France) A Géa	6	6
WC	(Spain) Jorge Plans	0	1
3	(France) V Royer	6	6
6	(Italy) F Maestrelli	4	3
(Spain) P Martín Tiffon	6	6
Q	(Germany) C Negritu	6	6
WC	(Italy) J Berrettini	1	4
(Netherlands) G den Ouden	6^{3}	4
Q	(Czech Republic) H Bartoň	7^{7}	6
(Italy) F Agamenone	5	2
2	(Kazakhstan) T Skatov	7	6

Second round
7	(Italy) E Dalla Valle	2	5
Q	(Argentina) GA Olivieri	6	7
Q	(France) A Géa	6	1	4
3	(France) V Royer	4	6	6
(Spain) P Martín Tiffon	7^{8}	6
Q	(Germany) C Negritu	6^{6}	3
Q	(Czech Republic) H Bartoň	6	6
2	(Kazakhstan) T Skatov	3	4

Quarterfinals
Q	(Argentina) GA Olivieri	6^{2}	4
3	(France) V Royer	7^{7}	6
(Spain) P Martín Tiffon	6^{5}	7^{7}	3
Q	(Czech Republic) H Bartoň	7^{7}	6^{4}	6

Semifinals
3	(France) V Royer	6	7^{8}
Q	(Czech Republic) H Bartoň	3	6^{6}
