= 2016 Sibiu Open – Doubles =

Doubles
- 2016 Sibiu Open

Final
- Champions: (Netherlands) Robin Haase (Germany) Tim Pütz
- Runners-up: (France) Tristan Lamasine (France) Jonathan Eysseric
- Score: 6–4, 6–2

Events
| Singles | Doubles |
- Sibiu Open

Victor Crivoi and Petru-Alexandru Luncanu were the defending champions but only Luncanu decided to defend his title, partnering Kamil Majchrzak. Luncanu lost in the first round to Jonathan Eysseric and Tristan Lamasine.

Robin Haase and Tim Pütz won the title after defeating Lamasine and Eysseric 6–4, 6–2 in the final.

== Seeds ==
1. (France) Jonathan Eysseric / (France) Tristan Lamasine (final)
2. (Italy) Riccardo Ghedin / (Italy) Alessandro Motti (quarterfinals)
3. (Uruguay) Ariel Behar / (Serbia) Ilija Vučić (semifinals)
4. (Austria) Maximilian Neuchrist / (Netherlands) David Pel (first round)

== Draw ==
Key

- Q = Qualifier
- WC = Wild card
- LL = Lucky loser
- Alt = Alternate
- ITF = ITF entry
- PR = Protected ranking
- SR = Special ranking
- SE = Special exempt
- JE = Junior exempt
- JR = Junior Accelerator Programme entrant
- CO = College Accelerator Programme entrant
- NG = Next Gen Accelerator Program entrant
- w/o = Walkover
- r = Retired
- d = Defaulted

First round
1 | (France) J Eysseric (France) T Lamasine | 6 | 5 | [16]
(Romania) P-A Luncanu (Poland) K Majchrzak | 1 | 7 | [14]
WC | (Romania) Andrei Ștefan Apostol (Romania) N Frunză | 7^{7} | 6^{5} | [11]
(Czech Republic) R Jebavý (Czech Republic) J Šátral | 6^{3} | 7^{7} | [9]
3 | (Uruguay) A Behar (Serbia) Ilija Vučić | 6 | 6
(Serbia) D Petrović (Serbia) M Zekić | 4 | 2
Alt | (Romania) V Antonescu (Romania) A Jecan | 3 | 2
(Czech Republic) Z Kolář (Czech Republic) V Šafránek | 6 | 6
(Austria) Lenny Hampel (Germany) A Mies | 2 | 3
(Austria) D Pichler (Germany) P Torebko | 6 | 6
WC | (Romania) V-M Anagnastopol (Romania) VV Cornea | 6 | 6
4 | (Austria) M Neuchrist (Netherlands) D Pel | 3 | 3
PR | (Netherlands) R Haase (Germany) T Pütz | 6 | 6
WC | (Poland) Michał Dembek (Poland) D Olejniczak | 3 | 0
(Croatia) N Mektić (Romania) A Ungur | 2 | 2
2 | (Italy) R Ghedin (Italy) A Motti | 6 | 6

Quarterfinals
1 | (France) J Eysseric (France) T Lamasine | 7 | 6
WC | (Romania) AȘ Apostol (Romania) N Frunză | 5 | 3
3 | (Uruguay) A Behar (Serbia) I Vučić | 6 | 6
(Czech Republic) Z Kolář (Czech Republic) V Šafránek | 4 | 4
(Austria) D Pichler (Germany) P Torebko | 6 | 6
WC | (Romania) V-M Anagnastopol (Romania) VV Cornea | 0 | 2
PR | (Netherlands) R Haase (Germany) T Pütz | 6 | 6
2 | (Italy) R Ghedin (Italy) A Motti | 1 | 4

Semifinals
1 | (France) J Eysseric (France) T Lamasine | 6 | 6
3 | (Uruguay) A Behar (Serbia) I Vučić | 4 | 3
(Austria) D Pichler (Germany) P Torebko | 2 | 2
PR | (Netherlands) R Haase (Germany) T Pütz | 6 | 6

Final
1 | (France) J Eysseric (France) T Lamasine | 4 | 2
PR | (Netherlands) R Haase (Germany) T Pütz | 6 | 6
