= 2012 BRD Sibiu Challenger – Singles =

Singles
- 2012 BRD Sibiu Challenger

Final
- Champion: (Romania) Adrian Ungur
- Runner-up: (Romania) Victor Hănescu
- Score: 6–4, 7–6^{(7–1)}

Events
Singles	Doubles
- BRD Sibiu Challenger

Adrian Ungur became the inaugural champion of Sibiu Challenger by defeating fellow countryman Victor Hănescu in the final, 6–4, 7–6^{(7–1)}.

== Seeds ==
1. (Romania) Adrian Ungur (champion)
2. (Romania) Victor Hănescu (final)
3. (Portugal) João Sousa (semifinals)
4. (Italy) Alessandro Giannessi (second round)
5. (Spain) Iñigo Cervantes (second round)
6. (Austria) Andreas Haider-Maurer (quarterfinals)
7. (Netherlands) Thiemo de Bakker (first round)
8. (Moldova) Radu Albot (second round)

== Draw ==
Key

- Q = Qualifier
- WC = Wild card
- LL = Lucky loser
- Alt = Alternate
- ITF = ITF entry
- PR = Protected ranking
- SR = Special ranking
- SE = Special exempt
- JE = Junior exempt
- JR = Junior Accelerator Programme entrant
- CO = College Accelerator Programme entrant
- NG = Next Gen Accelerator Program entrant
- w/o = Walkover
- r = Retired
- d = Defaulted

=== Finals ===
Semifinals
1	(Romania) Adrian Ungur	6	6
3	(Portugal) João Sousa	4	3
(France) David Guez	6	3	3
2	(Romania) Victor Hănescu	4	6	6

Final
1	(Romania) Adrian Ungur	6	7^{7}
2	(Romania) Victor Hănescu	4	6^{1}

=== Top half ===
First round
1	(Romania) A Ungur	6	6
Q	(Romania) Vasile-Alexandru Ghilea	0	0
Q	(Brazil) A Ghem	4	6	3
(Chile) C Saavedra-Corvalán	6	3	6
(Germany) K Krawietz	3	1
(Italy) S Vagnozzi	6	6
WC	(Romania) P-A Luncanu	6	2	4
8	(Moldova) R Albot	3	6	6
3	(Portugal) J Sousa	6	7^{8}
Q	(Montenegro) G Tošić	3	6^{6}
(Spain) G Granollers	6	6
(Spain) G Olaso	3	1
(Italy) A Arnaboldi	3	0
(Serbia) B Pašanski	6	6
WC	(Romania) V Victor Cornea	2	1
6	(Austria) A Haider-Maurer	6	6

Second round
1	(Romania) A Ungur	6	6
(Chile) C Saavedra-Corvalán	4	1
(Italy) S Vagnozzi	6	3	6
8	(Moldova) R Albot	2	6	4
3	(Portugal) J Sousa	6	6
(Spain) G Granollers	3	4
(Serbia) B Pašanski	6	6^{4}	6^{3}
6	(Austria) A Haider-Maurer	1	7^{7}	7^{7}

Quarterfinals
1	(Romania) A Ungur	7^{8}	6
(Italy) S Vagnozzi	6^{6}	3
3	(Portugal) J Sousa	6	2	6
6	(Austria) A Haider-Maurer	1	6	4

Semifinals
1	(Romania) A Ungur	6	6
3	(Portugal) J Sousa	4	3

=== Bottom half ===
First round
5	(Spain) I Cervantes	6	7^{11}
(Austria) M Linzer	3	6^{9}
(Germany) S Greul	6	4	6
(Italy) Enrico Burzi	4	6	2
(France) D Guez	6	6
WC	(Romania) Lucian Gheorghe	1	3
(Germany) J-L Struff	2	2
4	(Italy) A Giannessi	6	6
7	(Netherlands) T de Bakker	5	7^{7}	3
Q	(Croatia) T Androić	7	6^{5}	6
(United States) D Zivkovic	6
(Hungary) A Balázs	1^{r}
WC	(Romania) F Mergea	6	6
(Spain) J Samper-Montana	2	4
(Romania) V Crivoi	6	4	1
2	(Romania) V Hănescu	1	6	6

Second round
5	(Spain) I Cervantes	6^{10}	5
(Germany) S Greul	7^{12}	7
(France) D Guez	6	6
4	(Italy) A Giannessi	4	0
Q	(Croatia) T Androić	6	6
(United States) D Zivkovic	2	2
WC	(Romania) F Mergea	5	3
2	(Romania) V Hănescu	7	6

Quarterfinals
(Germany) S Greul	3	6	1
(France) D Guez	6	2	6
Q	(Croatia) T Androić	4	2
2	(Romania) V Hănescu	6	6

Semifinals
(France) D Guez	6	3	3
2	(Romania) V Hănescu	4	6	6
