= 2014 Sibiu Open =

- Date: 22–28 September
- Edition: 3rd
- Location: Sibiu, Romania

Champions

Singles
- (Australia) Jason Kubler

Doubles
- (Italy) Potito Starace / (Romania) Adrian Ungur
- Sibiu Open

The 2014 Sibiu Open was a professional tennis tournament played on clay courts. It was the third edition of the tournament which was part of the 2014 ATP Challenger Tour. It took place in Sibiu, Romania between 22 and 28 September 2014.

== Singles main-draw entrants ==
=== Seeds ===
Country	Player	Rank^{1}	Seed
SLO	Blaž Rola	85	1
ESP	Albert Montañés	110	2
ESP	Pere Riba	112	3
ROU	Adrian Ungur	132	4
ROU	Victor Hănescu	139	5
HUN	Márton Fucsovics	142	6
ITA	Potito Starace	149	7
ITA	Marco Cecchinato	151	8

- ^{1} Rankings are as of September 15, 2014.

=== Other entrants ===
The following players received wildcards into the singles main draw:

- (Romania) Tudor Șulea
- (Romania) Victor Vlad Cornea
- (Romania) Bogdan Ionuț Apostol
- (Romania) Lucian Gheorghe

The following players received entry from the qualifying draw:

- (Austria) Michael Linzer
- (Poland) Grzegorz Panfil
- (Slovakia) Marek Semjan
- (Serbia) Miljan Zekić

== Champions ==
=== Singles ===
- (Australia) Jason Kubler def. (Moldova) Radu Albot, 6–4, 6–1

=== Doubles ===
- (Italy) Potito Starace / (Romania) Adrian Ungur def. (Romania) Marius Copil / (Romania) Alexandru-Daniel Carpen, 7–5, 6–2
