= 2016 Sibiu Open =

- Date: 19–25 September
- Edition: 5th
- Location: Sibiu, Romania

Champions

Singles
- (Netherlands) Robin Haase

Doubles
- (Netherlands) Robin Haase / (Germany) Tim Pütz
- Sibiu Open

The 2016 Sibiu Open was a professional tennis tournament played on clay courts. It was the fifth edition of the tournament which was part of the 2016 ATP Challenger Tour. It took place in Sibiu, Romania between 19 and 25 September 2016.

== Singles main-draw entrants ==
=== Seeds ===
Country	Player	Rank^{1}	Seed
NED	Robin Haase	65	1
AUT	Gerald Melzer	84	2
HUN	Márton Fucsovics	147	3
ITA	Federico Gaio	179	4
CZE	Jan Šátral	182	5
SRB	Peđa Krstin	197	6
SRB	Miljan Zekić	202	7
ROU	Adrian Ungur	206	8

- ^{1} Rankings are as of September 12, 2016.

=== Other entrants ===
The following players received wildcards into the singles main draw:

- (Romania) Victor Vlad Cornea
- (Romania) Victor-Mugurel Anagnastopol
- (Poland) Michał Dembek
- (Romania) Bogdan Borza

The following player received entry using a protected ranking:

- (Germany) Tim Pütz

The following player received entry as an alternate:

- (Serbia) Danilo Petrović

The following players received entry from the qualifying draw:

- (Australia) Christopher O'Connell
- (Germany) Lenny Hampel
- (Germany) Jonas Lütjen
- (Germany) Andreas Mies

== Champions ==
=== Singles ===
- (Netherlands) Robin Haase def. (Italy) Lorenzo Giustino, 7–6^{(7–2)}, 6–2.

=== Doubles ===
- (Netherlands) Robin Haase / (Germany) Tim Pütz def. (France) Jonathan Eysseric / (France) Tristan Lamasine, 6–4, 6–2.
