= Dragoș Dima =

Romanian tennis player

- Country (sports): Romania
- Residence: Bucharest, Romania
- Born: 16 June 1992 (age 33) Ploiești, Romania
- Height: 1.80 m (5 ft 11 in)
- Plays: Right-handed (one-handed backhand)
- Prize money: $97,864

Singles
- Career record: 2–1 (at ATP Tour level, Grand Slam level, and in Davis Cup)
- Career titles: 0
- Highest ranking: No. 279 (24 September 2018)

Doubles
- Career record: 0–0 (at ATP Tour level, Grand Slam level, and in Davis Cup)
- Career titles: 0
- Highest ranking: No. 491 (6 May 2019)

Dragoș Dima (born 16 June 1992 in Ploiești) is a Romanian professional tennis player. He has a career high ATP singles ranking of No. 279 achieved on 24 September 2018 and a career high ATP doubles ranking of No. 491 achieved on 6 May 2019.

Dima represents Romania at the Davis Cup making his debut on 15 September 2017 against Austria's Gerald Melzer in 1st round play-offs of Group I.

== ATP Challenger Tour and ITF Futures finals ==
=== Singles: 22 (9 titles, 13 runners-up) ===
Legend
ATP Challenger Tour (1–0)
ITF Futures (8–13)

| Result | W–L | Date | Tournament | Tier | Surface | Opponent | Score |
|---|---|---|---|---|---|---|---|
| Loss | 0–1 | 17 June 2012 | Serbia F1, Belgrade | Futures | Clay | (Croatia) Duje Kekez | 4–6, 6–4, 2–5 Retired |
| Loss | 0–2 | 25 May 2014 | Romania F2, Bucharest | Futures | Clay | (Moldova) Maxim Dubarenco | 7–5, 3–6, 1–6 |
| Loss | 0–3 | 20 July 2014 | Romania F8, Curtea de Argeș | Futures | Clay | (Slovakia) Filip Horanský | 4–6, 4–6 |
| Loss | 0–4 | 30 May 2015 | Romania F4, Bacău | Futures | Clay | (Poland) Kamil Majchrzak | 1–6, 2–6 |
| Loss | 0–5 | 25 July 2015 | Romania F10, Pitești | Futures | Clay | (Slovakia) Filip Horanský | 7–6^{(7–2)}, 2–6, 4–6 |
| Loss | 0–6 | 22 August 2015 | Romania F13, Mediaș | Futures | Clay | (Lithuania) Laurynas Grigelis | 2–6, 3–6 |
| Win | 1–6 | 26 March 2016 | Croatia F4, Opatija | Futures | Clay | (Croatia) Nino Serdarušić | 6–1, 6–1 |
| Win | 2–6 | 22 May 2016 | Romania F3, Bucharest | Futures | Clay | (Romania) Teodor-Dacian Crăciun | 7–5, 6–3 |
| Win | 3–6 | 29 May 2016 | Romania F4, Bacău | Futures | Clay | (Argentina) Juan Pablo Paz | 6–4, 4–6, 6–2 |
| Loss | 3–7 | 3 July 2016 | Romania F8, Curtea de Argeș | Futures | Clay | (Netherlands) Miliaan Niesten | 1–6, 3–6 |
| Win | 4–7 | 23 July 2016 | Romania F9, Pitești | Futures | Clay | (France) Jordan Ubiergo | 6–2, 7–5 |
| Loss | 4–8 | 6 August 2016 | Romania F11, Pitești | Futures | Clay | (Romania) Nicolae Frunză | 3–6, 0–6 |
| Win | 5–8 | 14 August 2016 | Romania F12, Iași | Futures | Clay | (Argentina) Hernán Casanova | 6–2, 3–0 Retired |
| Loss | 5–9 | 12 August 2017 | Romania F9, Bucharest | Futures | Clay | (Bolivia) Hugo Dellien | 2–6, 4–6 |
| Win | 6–9 | 27 August 2017 | Romania F11, Chitila | Futures | Clay | (Romania) Bogdan Borza | 7–5, 6–3 |
| Loss | 6–10 | 24 September 2017 | Turkey F35, Antalya | Futures | Clay | (Belgium) Julien Cagnina | 3–6, 3–6 |
| Loss | 6–11 | 4 February 2018 | Turkey F4, Antalya | Futures | Clay | (Spain) Enrique López Pérez | 2–6, 3–6 |
| Loss | 6–12 | 18 March 2018 | Croatia F2, Poreč | Futures | Clay | (Hungary) Máté Valkusz | 0–6, 3–6 |
| Win | 7–12 | 27 May 2018 | Romania F1, Bucharest | Futures | Clay | (Romania) Nicolae Frunză | 6–2, 6–4 |
| Loss | 7–13 | 23 June 2018 | Hungary F5, Budapest | Futures | Clay | (Hungary) Zsombor Piros | 3–6, 2–6 |
| Win | 8–13 | 12 August 2018 | Romania F8, Bucharest | Futures | Clay | (Romania) Bogdan Ionuț Apostol | 6–2, 7–5 |
| Win | 9–13 | 23 September 2018 | Sibiu Open, Romania | Challenger | Clay | (Netherlands) Jelle Sels | 6–3, 6–2 |

=== Doubles: 2 (0 titles, 2 runners-up) ===
Legend
ATP Challenger Tour (0–0)
ITF Futures (0–2)

| Result | W–L | Date | Tournament | Tier | Surface | Partner | Opponents | Score |
|---|---|---|---|---|---|---|---|---|
| Loss | 0–1 | 17 August 2014 | Romania F11, Iași | Futures | Clay | (Romania) Vasile Antonescu | (Romania) Patrick Grigoriu (Romania) Costin Pavăl | 0–6, 3–6 |
| Loss | 0–2 | 25 March 2017 | Italy F5, Santa Margherita di Pula | Futures | Clay | (Argentina) Juan Pablo Paz | (Italy) Andrea Basso (Croatia) Viktor Galović | 4–6, 4–6 |

== Davis Cup ==
=== Singles performances (1–2) ===
| Edition | Round | Date | Against | Surface | Opponent | Win/Lose | Result |
|---|---|---|---|---|---|---|---|
| 2017 Europe/Africa Zone Group I | 1R PO | 15–17 September 2017 | Austria | Clay | (Austria) Gerald Melzer | Lose | 1–6, 1–6, 6–3, 1–6 |
| 2017 Europe/Africa Zone Group I | 2R PO | 27–29 October 2017 | Israel | Hard | (Israel) Edan Leshem | Lose | 3–6, 7–5, 2–6, 6–3, 3–6 |
| 2018 Europe/Africa Zone Group II | 2R | 7–8 April | Morocco | Hard (i) | (Morocco) Soufiane El Mesbahi | Win | 6–0, 6–4 |
