= Sibiu Open =

Defunct tennis tournament
- Location: Sibiu, Romania
- Venue: Tenis Club Pamira
- Category: ATP Challenger Tour
- Surface: Clay - Outdoors
- Draw: 32S/32Q/16D
- Prize money: €64,000
- Website: website

The Sibiu Open was a tennis tournament held in Sibiu, Romania since 2012. In early 2012 BRD – Groupe Société Générale was announced as the sponsor of four Romanian ATP Challenger Tour tournaments with Sibiu chosen to host a brand new tournament, the BRD Sibiu Challenger, as it was named prior to the 2013 change of sponsor. The event was part of the ATP Challenger Tour and was played on outdoor clay courts. It was cancelled in 2025 and replaced by the Târgu Mureș Challenger.

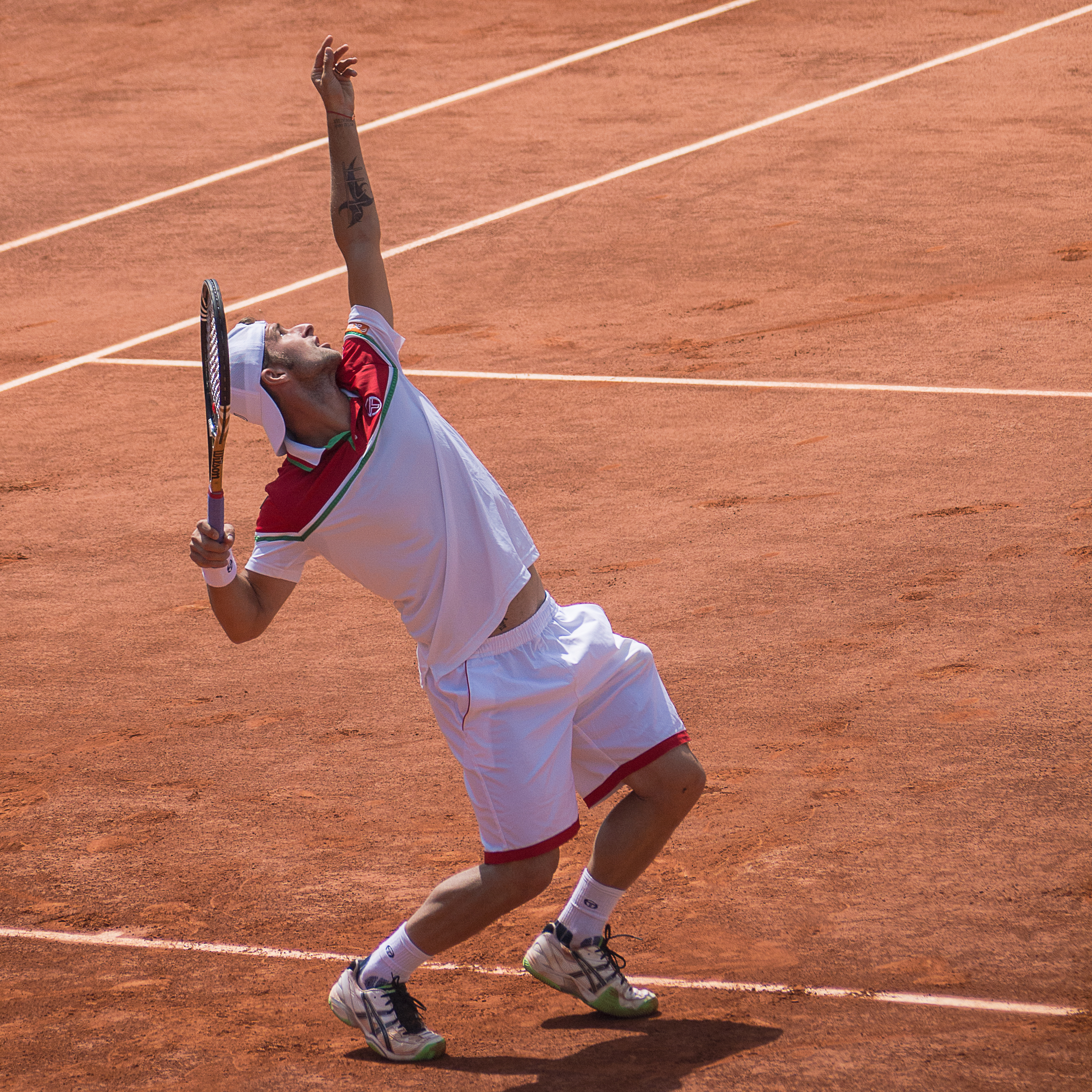
Romanian Adrian Ungur won the inaugural edition in 2012.

== Past finals ==
=== Singles ===
Year	Champion	Runner-up	Score
2024	(France) Valentin Royer	(France) Luka Pavlovic	6–4, 6–0
2023	(Bosnia and Herzegovina) Nerman Fatić	(Bosnia and Herzegovina) Damir Džumhur	6–2, 6–4
2022	(Bosnia and Herzegovina) Nerman Fatić	(Bosnia and Herzegovina) Damir Džumhur	6–3, 6–4
2021	(Italy) Stefano Travaglia	(Australia) Thanasi Kokkinakis	7–6^{(7–4)}, 6–2
2020	(Switzerland) Marc-Andrea Hüsler	(Argentina) Tomás Martín Etcheverry	7–5, 6–0
2019	(Serbia) Danilo Petrović	(Australia) Christopher O'Connell	6–4, 6–2
2018	(Romania) Dragoș Dima	(Netherlands) Jelle Sels	6–3, 6–2
2017	(Germany) Cedrik-Marcel Stebe	(Spain) Carlos Taberner	6–3, 6–3
2016	(Netherlands) Robin Haase	(Italy) Lorenzo Giustino	7–6^{(7–2)}, 6–2
2015	(Romania) Adrian Ungur	(Spain) Pere Riba	6–4, 3–6, 7–5
2014	(Australia) Jason Kubler	(Moldova) Radu Albot	6–4, 6–1
2013	(Czech Republic) Jaroslav Pospisil	(Italy) Marco Cecchinato	6–4, 4–6, 1–6
2012	(Romania) Adrian Ungur	(Romania) Victor Hănescu	6–4, 7–6^{(7–1)}

=== Doubles ===
Year	Champions	Runners-up	Score
2024	(Peru) Alexander Merino (Germany) Christoph Negritu	(Canada) Liam Draxl (Canada) Cleeve Harper	6–2, 7–6^{(7–2)}
2023	(Czech Republic) Andrew Paulson (Czech Republic) Michael Vrbenský	(Poland) Piotr Matuszewski (Germany) Kai Wehnelt	6–2, 6–2
2022	(Serbia) Ivan Sabanov (Serbia) Matej Sabanov	(Austria) Alexander Erler (Austria) Lucas Miedler	3–6, 7–5, [10–4]
2021	(Austria) Alexander Erler (Austria) Lucas Miedler	(United States) James Cerretani (Switzerland) Luca Margaroli	6–3, 6–1
2020	(United States) Hunter Reese (Poland) Jan Zieliński	(United States) Robert Galloway (Mexico) Hans Hach Verdugo	6–4, 6–2
2019	(France) Sadio Doumbia (France) Fabien Reboul	(Croatia) Ivan Sabanov (Croatia) Matej Sabanov	6–4, 3–6, [10–7]
2018	(Germany) Kevin Krawietz (Germany) Andreas Mies	(Poland) Tomasz Bednarek (Netherlands) David Pel	6–4, 6–2
2017	(Italy) Marco Cecchinato (Italy) Matteo Donati	(Belgium) Sander Gillé (Belgium) Joran Vliegen	6–3, 6–1
2016	(Netherlands) Robin Haase (Germany) Tim Pütz	(France) Jonathan Eysseric (France) Tristan Lamasine	6–4, 6–2
2015	(Romania) Victor Crivoi (Romania) Petru-Alexandru Luncanu	(Serbia) Ilija Bozoljac (Serbia) Dušan Lajović	6–4, 6–3
2014	(Italy) Potito Starace (Romania) Adrian Ungur	(Romania) Marius Copil (Romania) Alexandru-Daniel Carpen	7–5, 6–2
2013	(Australia) Rameez Junaid (Australia) Philipp Oswald	(United Kingdom) Jamie Delgado (Australia) Jordan Kerr	6–4, 6–4
2012	(Croatia) Marin Draganja (Croatia) Lovro Zovko	(Romania) Alexandru-Daniel Carpen (Chile) Cristóbal Saavedra-Corvalán	6–4, 4–6, [11–9]
