= 2025 Izida Cup II – Singles =

Singles
- 2025 Izida Cup II

Final
- Champion: (Slovakia) Alex Molčan
- Runner-up: (Austria) Joel Schwärzler
- Score: 7–5, 6–4

Events
Singles	Doubles
← 2025 ·	Izida Cup	· 2026 →

Zdeněk Kolář was the defending champion but chose not to defend his title.

Alex Molčan won the title after defeating Joel Schwärzler 7–5, 6–4 in the final.

== Seeds ==
1. (Argentina) Federico Coria (withdrew)
2. (Ecuador) Álvaro Guillén Meza (second round)
3. (Bosnia and Herzegovina) Nerman Fatić (withdrew)
4. Ivan Gakhov (first round)
5. (Portugal) Frederico Ferreira Silva (quarterfinals)
6. (Croatia) Matej Dodig (semifinals)
7. (Bulgaria) Dimitar Kuzmanov (first round)
8. (Croatia) Duje Ajduković (first round)

== Draw ==
Key

- Q = Qualifier
- WC = Wild card
- LL = Lucky loser
- Alt = Alternate
- ITF = ITF entry
- PR = Protected ranking
- SR = Special ranking
- SE = Special exempt
- JE = Junior exempt
- JR = Junior Accelerator Programme entrant
- CO = College Accelerator Programme entrant
- NG = Next Gen Accelerator Program entrant
- w/o = Walkover
- r = Retired
- d = Defaulted

=== Finals ===
Semifinals
6	(Croatia) Matej Dodig	3	0
Q	(Slovakia) Alex Molčan	6	6
NG	(Austria) Joel Schwärzler	6	6
Marat Sharipov	2	2

Final
Q	(Slovakia) Alex Molčan	7	6
NG	(Austria) Joel Schwärzler	5	4

=== Top half ===
First round
LL	(Poland) F Pieczonka	4	3
(India) S Nagal	6	6
Q	(Croatia) N Serdarušić	5	4
Alt	(Bosnia and Herzegovina) A Nedić	7	6
WC	(Bulgaria) A Donski	6	7^{8}
(Poland) D Michalski	1	6^{6}
(Romania) FC Jianu	2	2
6	(Croatia) M Dodig	6	6
4	I Gakhov	3	3
WC	(Bulgaria) A Vasilev	6	6
Q	(Slovakia) A Molčan	6	7^{7}
WC	(Bulgaria) I Ivanov	2	6^{2}
(Spain) D Rincón	3	5
(Italy) M Cecchinato	6	7
Q	(Uruguay) F Roncadelli	3	6	6
7	(Bulgaria) D Kuzmanov	6	3	1

Second round
(India) S Nagal	5	6	4
Alt	(Bosnia and Herzegovina) A Nedić	7	1	6
WC	(Bulgaria) A Donski	0	6	3
6	(Croatia) M Dodig	6	4	6
WC	(Bulgaria) A Vasilev	4	0
Q	(Slovakia) A Molčan	6	6
(Italy) M Cecchinato	2	6^{4}
Q	(Uruguay) F Roncadelli	6	7^{7}

Quarterfinals
Alt	(Bosnia and Herzegovina) A Nedić	3	5
6	(Croatia) M Dodig	6	7
Q	(Slovakia) A Molčan	6	6
Q	(Uruguay) F Roncadelli	3	1

Semifinals
6	(Croatia) M Dodig	3	0
Q	(Slovakia) A Molčan	6	6

=== Bottom half ===
First round
8	(Croatia) D Ajduković	1	4
NG	(Austria) J Schwärzler	6	6
JR	(Japan) Naoya Honda	4	3
Q	(Spain) D Jordà Sanchis	6	6
LL	(Italy) F Bondioli	6	3	3
Alt	(Slovakia) M Karol	4	6	6
(Argentina) L Midón	4	6^{6}
Q	(Italy) F Agamenone	6	7^{8}
5	(Portugal) F Ferreira Silva	6	7
(Portugal) T Pereira	3	5
Q	(United States) Dali Blanch	5	7	6^{4}
(Switzerland) M Brunold	7	5	7^{7}
Alt	(India) Aryan Shah	5	2
M Sharipov	7	6
(Bolivia) M Dellien	3	4
2	(Ecuador) Á Guillén Meza	6	6

Second round
NG	(Austria) J Schwärzler	6	6
Q	(Spain) D Jordà Sanchis	4	3
Alt	(Slovakia) M Karol	2	6	2
Q	(Italy) F Agamenone	6	4	6
5	(Portugal) F Ferreira Silva	6	7
(Switzerland) M Brunold	3	5
M Sharipov	7^{7}	5	6
2	(Ecuador) Á Guillén Meza	6^{2}	7	4

Quarterfinals
NG	(Austria) J Schwärzler	6	7
Q	(Italy) F Agamenone	3	5
5	(Portugal) F Ferreira Silva	3	7	1
M Sharipov	6	5	6

Semifinals
NG	(Austria) J Schwärzler	6	6
M Sharipov	2	2
