= 2025 Izida Cup – Doubles =

Doubles
- 2025 Izida Cup

Final
- Champions: (Serbia) Stefan Latinović; Marat Sharipov
- Runners-up: (Slovakia) Miloš Karol (Finland) Patrik Niklas-Salminen
- Score: 6–3, 2–6, [13–11]

Events
Singles	Doubles
- Izida Cup

Liam Draxl and Cleeve Harper were the defending champions but chose not to defend their title.

Stefan Latinović and Marat Sharipov won the title after defeating Miloš Karol and Patrik Niklas-Salminen 6–3, 2–6, [13–11] in the final.

== Seeds ==
1. (Slovakia) Miloš Karol / (Finland) Patrik Niklas-Salminen (final)
2. (Czech Republic) Zdeněk Kolář / (Croatia) Nino Serdarušić (semifinals)
3. (Bulgaria) Alexander Donski / (Bulgaria) Petr Nesterov (quarterfinals)
4. (Uruguay) Ignacio Carou / (Bolivia) Murkel Dellien (quarterfinals)

== Draw ==
Key

- Q = Qualifier
- WC = Wild card
- LL = Lucky loser
- Alt = Alternate
- ITF = ITF entry
- PR = Protected ranking
- SR = Special ranking
- SE = Special exempt
- JE = Junior exempt
- JR = Junior Accelerator Programme entrant
- CO = College Accelerator Programme entrant
- NG = Next Gen Accelerator Program entrant
- w/o = Walkover
- r = Retired
- d = Defaulted

=== Draw ===
First round
1	(Slovakia) M Karol (Finland) P Niklas-Salminen	6	6
(Croatia) D Ajduković (Croatia) A Kalender	3	4
(Argentina) L Midón (Spain) N Sánchez Izquierdo	3	4
(Bosnia and Herzegovina) N Fatić (Bosnia and Herzegovina) A Nedić	6	6
4	(Uruguay) I Carou (Bolivia) M Dellien	7	6
(Ukraine) O Prihodko (Netherlands) J Sels	5	1
(Ukraine) Eric Vanshelboim (Kazakhstan) D Yevseyev	4	2
Alt	(Uzbekistan) S Fomin; Pavel Verbin	6	6
(India) SDP Dev (India) Nitin Kumar Sinha	6^{6}	4
(Serbia) S Latinović; M Sharipov	7^{8}	6
WC	(Bulgaria) Viktor Kirov (Bulgaria) A Vasilev	1	3
3	(Bulgaria) A Donski (Bulgaria) P Nesterov	6	6
Svyatoslav Gulin (India) Parikshit Somani	5	1
(Italy) F Agamenone (Argentina) LE Ambrogi	7	6
WC	(Japan) Naoya Honda (Bulgaria) I Ivanov	0	2
2	(Czech Republic) Z Kolář (Croatia) N Serdarušić	6	6

Quarterfinals
1	(Slovakia) M Karol (Finland) P Niklas-Salminen	6	6
(Bosnia and Herzegovina) N Fatić (Bosnia and Herzegovina) A Nedić	3	4
4	(Uruguay) I Carou (Bolivia) M Dellien	2	1
Alt	(Uzbekistan) S Fomin; P Verbin	6	6
(Serbia) S Latinović; M Sharipov	7^{7}	6
3	(Bulgaria) A Donski (Bulgaria) P Nesterov	6^{5}	3
(Italy) F Agamenone (Argentina) LE Ambrogi	5	4
2	(Czech Republic) Z Kolář (Croatia) N Serdarušić	7	6

Semifinals
1	(Slovakia) M Karol (Finland) P Niklas-Salminen	5	6	[10]
Alt	(Uzbekistan) S Fomin; P Verbin	7	3	[7]
(Serbia) S Latinović; M Sharipov	7^{7}	6
2	(Czech Republic) Z Kolář (Croatia) N Serdarušić	6^{4}	2

Final
1	(Slovakia) M Karol (Finland) P Niklas-Salminen	3	6	[11]
(Serbia) S Latinović; M Sharipov	6	2	[13]
