= 2024 Dobrich Challenger II – Doubles =

Doubles
- 2024 Dobrich Challenger II

Final
- Champions: (Canada) Liam Draxl (Canada) Cleeve Harper
- Runners-up: (Italy) Francesco Maestrelli (Italy) Filippo Romano
- Score: 6–1, 3–6, [12–10]

Events
Singles	Doubles
- Dobrich Challenger

Alexander Merino and Christoph Negritu were the defending champions but lost in the quarterfinals to Francesco Maestrelli and Filippo Romano.

Liam Draxl and Cleeve Harper won the title after defeating Maestrelli and Romano 6–1, 3–6, [12–10] in the final.

== Seeds ==
1. (Zimbabwe) Benjamin Lock / (Zimbabwe) Courtney John Lock (quarterfinals)
2. (Bulgaria) Alexander Donski / (Bulgaria) Anthony Genov (first round)
3. (Peru) Alexander Merino / (Germany) Christoph Negritu (quarterfinals)
4. (Canada) Liam Draxl / (Canada) Cleeve Harper (champions)

== Draw ==
Key

- Q = Qualifier
- WC = Wild card
- LL = Lucky loser
- Alt = Alternate
- ITF = ITF entry
- PR = Protected ranking
- SR = Special ranking
- SE = Special exempt
- JE = Junior exempt
- JR = Junior Accelerator Programme entrant
- CO = College Accelerator Programme entrant
- NG = Next Gen Accelerator Program entrant
- w/o = Walkover
- r = Retired
- d = Defaulted

=== Draw ===
First round
(Portugal) F Ferreira Silva (Italy) L Giustino	6	6
WC	(Bulgaria) Georgi Georgiev (Bulgaria) Viktor Kirov	3	3
4	(Canada) L Draxl (Canada) C Harper	6	6
(Czech Republic) J Forejtek (Czech Republic) Jakub Nicod	1	4
WC	(Bulgaria) Dinko Dinev (Czech Republic) D Kellovský	4	4
(Czech Republic) F Duda (Czech Republic) D Poljak	6	6
(France) V Royer (Latvia) R Strombachs	4	3
(Italy) F Maestrelli (Italy) F Romano	6	6
(Spain) M Alcalá Gurri (Spain) Àlex Martí Pujolràs	2	1
3	(Peru) A Merino (Germany) C Negritu	6	6
(Spain) D Jordà Sanchis (Spain) N Sánchez Izquierdo	6	0
(Netherlands) G den Ouden (Netherlands) J Sels	4	3^{r}
(France) C Denolly (France) L Pavlovic	6	6
2	(Bulgaria) A Donski (Bulgaria) A Genov	4	2

Quarterfinals
1	(Zimbabwe) B Lock (Zimbabwe) CJ Lock	5	4
(Portugal) F Ferreira Silva (Italy) L Giustino	7	6
4	(Canada) L Draxl (Canada) C Harper	6	7^{9}
(Czech Republic) F Duda (Czech Republic) D Poljak	3	6^{7}
(Italy) F Maestrelli (Italy) F Romano	7	6
3	(Peru) A Merino (Germany) C Negritu	5	3
(Spain) D Jordà Sanchis (Spain) N Sánchez Izquierdo	6	7
(France) C Denolly (France) L Pavlovic	2	5

Semifinals
(Portugal) F Ferreira Silva (Italy) L Giustino
4	(Canada) L Draxl (Canada) C Harper	w/o
(Italy) F Maestrelli (Italy) F Romano	6	7
(Spain) D Jordà Sanchis (Spain) N Sánchez Izquierdo	3	5

Final
4	(Canada) L Draxl (Canada) C Harper	6	3	[12]
(Italy) F Maestrelli (Italy) F Romano	1	6	[10]
