= 2024 Dobrich Challenger II – Singles =

Singles
- 2024 Dobrich Challenger II

Final
- Champion: (Netherlands) Guy den Ouden
- Runner-up: (Netherlands) Jelle Sels
- Score: 6–2, 6–3

Events
Singles	Doubles
- Dobrich Challenger

Juan Bautista Torres was the defending champion but chose not to defend his title.

Guy den Ouden won the title after defeating Jelle Sels 6–2, 6–3 in the final.

== Seeds ==
1. (France) Valentin Royer (quarterfinals)
2. (Italy) Stefano Travaglia (withdrew)
3. (United Kingdom) Oliver Crawford (first round)
4. (Canada) Liam Draxl (second round)
5. (Italy) Francesco Maestrelli (first round)
6. (Italy) Lorenzo Giustino (quarterfinals)
7. (Italy) Enrico Dalla Valle (first round)
8. (France) Clément Tabur (first round)
9. (Bulgaria) Dimitar Kuzmanov (quarterfinals)

== Draw ==
Key

- Q = Qualifier
- WC = Wild card
- LL = Lucky loser
- Alt = Alternate
- ITF = ITF entry
- PR = Protected ranking
- SR = Special ranking
- SE = Special exempt
- JE = Junior exempt
- JR = Junior Accelerator Programme entrant
- CO = College Accelerator Programme entrant
- NG = Next Gen Accelerator Program entrant
- w/o = Walkover
- r = Retired
- d = Defaulted

=== Finals ===
Semifinals
Alt	(Argentina) Genaro Alberto Olivieri	1	4
(Netherlands) Guy den Ouden	6	6
(Czech Republic) Jakub Nicod	2	0^{r}
(Netherlands) Jelle Sels	6	1

Final
(Netherlands) Guy den Ouden	6	6
(Netherlands) Jelle Sels	2	3

=== Top half ===
First round
1	(France) V Royer	6	6
(Spain) N Sánchez Izquierdo	2	3
Q	(Italy) F Romano	3	6	6^{4}
(Spain) Àlex Martí Pujolràs	6	4	7^{7}
Alt	(Argentina) GA Olivieri	6	7^{7}
(Czech Republic) J Forejtek	3	6^{3}
(United Kingdom) F Gill	0	6	7
7	(Italy) E Dalla Valle	6	4	5
4	(Canada) L Draxl	6	6
(United States) T Kodat	1	3
(Netherlands) G den Ouden	7^{7}	6
Q	(Portugal) F Ferreira Silva	6^{5}	3
WC	(Bulgaria) Dinko Dinev	2	2
Q	(Spain) M Alcalá Gurri	6	6
WC	(Bulgaria) A Donski	7^{7}	6
8	(France) C Tabur	6^{4}	2

Second round
1	(France) V Royer	6	4	7
(Spain) À Martí Pujolràs	0	6	5
Alt	(Argentina) GA Olivieri	7	6^{3}	7^{9}
(United Kingdom) F Gill	5	7^{7}	6^{7}
4	(Canada) L Draxl	3	5
(Netherlands) G den Ouden	6	7
Q	(Spain) M Alcalá Gurri	0	7	3
WC	(Bulgaria) A Donski	6	5	6

Quarterfinals
1	(France) V Royer	4	3
Alt	(Argentina) GA Olivieri	6	6
(Netherlands) G den Ouden	6	6
WC	(Bulgaria) A Donski	3	3

Semifinals
Alt	(Argentina) GA Olivieri	1	4
(Netherlands) G den Ouden	6	6

=== Bottom half ===
First round
6	(Italy) L Giustino	6	6
Q	(Belgium) K Coppejans	3	4
Q	(Germany) C Negritu	6	6
(France) L Pavlovic	1	4
(Slovenia) Filip Jeff Planinšek	6	3	6^{11}
(Spain) D Jordà Sanchis	3	6	7^{13}
(Czech Republic) Jakub Nicod	6	6
3	(United Kingdom) O Crawford	3	2
5	(Italy) F Maestrelli	6	6^{3}	2
(Netherlands) J Sels	4	7^{7}	6
(Zimbabwe) B Lock	4	6	1
(France) C Denolly	6	3	6
WC	(Bulgaria) I Ivanov	6	5	1
Q	(Latvia) R Strombachs	4	7	6
(Italy) R Brancaccio	5	3
9	(Bulgaria) D Kuzmanov	7	6

Second round
6	(Italy) L Giustino	7^{7}	2	6
Q	(Germany) C Negritu	6^{2}	6	2
(Spain) D Jordà Sanchis	6^{6}	7^{7}	5
(Czech Republic) J Nicod	7^{8}	6^{2}	7
(Netherlands) J Sels	6	6
(France) C Denolly	4	4
Q	(Latvia) R Strombachs	6^{3}	6^{4}
9	(Bulgaria) D Kuzmanov	7^{7}	7^{7}

Quarterfinals
6	(Italy) L Giustino	6^{5}	2
(Czech Republic) J Nicod	7^{7}	6
(Netherlands) J Sels	7^{7}	7
9	(Bulgaria) D Kuzmanov	6^{3}	5

Semifinals
(Czech Republic) J Nicod	2	0^{r}
(Netherlands) J Sels	6	1
