= 2025 Izida Cup – Singles =

Singles
- 2025 Izida Cup

Final
- Champion: (Czech Republic) Zdeněk Kolář
- Runner-up: (Bolivia) Murkel Dellien
- Score: 6–2, 6–2

Events
| Singles | Doubles |
- Izida Cup

Guy den Ouden was the defending champion but chose not to defend his title.

Zdeněk Kolář won the title after defeating Murkel Dellien 6–2, 6–2 in the final.

== Seeds ==
1. (Bosnia and Herzegovina) Nerman Fatić (semifinals, retired)
2. (Croatia) Duje Ajduković (quarterfinals)
3. (Romania) Filip Cristian Jianu (first round, retired)
4. (Argentina) Lautaro Midón (first round)
5. Marat Sharipov (second round)
6. (Bolivia) Murkel Dellien (final)
7. (Spain) Daniel Rincón (second round)
8. (Switzerland) Mika Brunold (second round)

== Draw ==
Key

- Q = Qualifier
- WC = Wild card
- LL = Lucky loser
- Alt = Alternate
- ITF = ITF entry
- PR = Protected ranking
- SR = Special ranking
- SE = Special exempt
- JE = Junior exempt
- JR = Junior Accelerator Programme entrant
- CO = College Accelerator Programme entrant
- NG = Next Gen Accelerator Program entrant
- w/o = Walkover
- r = Retired
- d = Defaulted

=== Finals ===
Semifinals
1 | (Bosnia and Herzegovina) Nerman Fatić | 0 | 0^{r}
(Czech Republic) Zdeněk Kolář | 6 | 0
6 | (Bolivia) Murkel Dellien | 6 | 4 | 6
Q | (United States) Dali Blanch | 0 | 6 | 1

Final
(Czech Republic) Zdeněk Kolář | 6 | 6
6 | (Bolivia) Murkel Dellien | 2 | 2

=== Top half ===
First round
1 | (Bosnia and Herzegovina) N Fatić | 6^{4} | 6 | 6
(Switzerland) K Feldbausch | 7^{7} | 4 | 2
(Argentina) LE Ambrogi | 7 | 6
(Austria) J Schwärzler | 5 | 4
(Uruguay) F Roncadelli | 1 | 6 | 2
Q | (Romania) Sebastian Gima | 6 | 3 | 6
(Netherlands) J Sels | 1 | 2
7 | (Spain) D Rincón | 6 | 6
3 | (Romania) FC Jianu | 6^{7} | 2^{r}
Q | (Romania) Ștefan Adrian Andreescu | 7^{9} | 3
(Czech Republic) Z Kolář | 6 | 6
WC | (Bulgaria) A Vasilev | 2 | 3
(Spain) N Sánchez Izquierdo | 6 | 6
Q | (Bulgaria) Viktor Markov | 4 | 0
WC | (Bulgaria) I Ivanov | 2 | 2
5 | M Sharipov | 6 | 6

Second round
1 | (Bosnia and Herzegovina) N Fatić | 6 | 6
(Argentina) LE Ambrogi | 3 | 2
Q | (Romania) S Gima | 6 | 6
7 | (Spain) D Rincón | 4 | 4
Q | (Romania) ȘA Andreescu | 4 | 2
(Czech Republic) Z Kolář | 6 | 6
(Spain) N Sánchez Izquierdo | 6 | 6
5 | M Sharipov | 3 | 2

Quarterfinals
1 | (Bosnia and Herzegovina) N Fatić | 6 | 6
Q | (Romania) S Gima | 2 | 2
(Czech Republic) Z Kolář | 6 | 6
(Spain) N Sánchez Izquierdo | 3 | 0

Semifinals
1 | (Bosnia and Herzegovina) N Fatić | 0 | 0^{r}
(Czech Republic) Z Kolář | 6 | 0

=== Bottom half ===
First round
6 | (Bolivia) M Dellien | 6 | 6
Q | (Bulgaria) Anas Mazdrashki | 0 | 3
(Kazakhstan) D Yevseyev | 6 | 6
(Spain) B Zapata Miralles | 2 | 0
(Austria) S Kopp | 7 | 6
(Bosnia and Herzegovina) A Nedić | 5 | 1
(Slovakia) M Karol | 6 | 6
4 | (Argentina) L Midón | 1 | 3
8 | (Switzerland) M Brunold | 6 | 6
(Ukraine) O Prihodko | 4 | 4
Q | (Sweden) O Wallin | 3 | 6 | 6^{3}
Q | (United States) Dali Blanch | 6 | 3 | 7^{7}
WC | (Bulgaria) A Donski | 7 | 4 | 4
NG | (India) Aryan Shah | 5 | 6 | 6
JR | (Japan) Naoya Honda | 6 | 4 | 4
2 | (Croatia) D Ajduković | 2 | 6 | 6

Second round
6 | (Bolivia) M Dellien | 6 | 6
(Kazakhstan) D Yevseyev | 4 | 3
(Austria) S Kopp | 3 | 6 | 7^{7}
(Slovakia) M Karol | 6 | 3 | 6^{2}
8 | (Switzerland) M Brunold | 4 | 7 | 2
Q | (United States) Dal Blanch | 6 | 5 | 6
NG | (India) A Shah | 3 | 3
2 | (Croatia) D Ajduković | 6 | 6

Quarterfinals
6 | (Bolivia) M Dellien | 7^{7} | 6
(Austria) S Kopp | 6^{5} | 0
Q | (United States) Dal Blanch | 6 | 7^{7}
2 | (Croatia) D Ajduković | 4 | 6^{3}

Semifinals
6 | (Bolivia) M Dellien | 6 | 4 | 6
Q | (United States) Dal Blanch | 0 | 6 | 1
