= 2025 Izida Cup II – Doubles =

Doubles
- 2025 Izida Cup II

Final
- Champions: (Austria) David Pichler (Croatia) Nino Serdarušić
- Runners-up: (Romania) Alexandru Jecan (Romania) Bogdan Pavel
- Score: 4–6, 7–6^{(7–2)}, [10–7]

Events
Singles	Doubles
- Izida Cup

Stefan Latinović and Marat Sharipov were the defending champions but lost in the first round to Szymon Kielan and Filip Pieczonka.

David Pichler and Nino Serdarušić won the title after defeating Alexandru Jecan and Bogdan Pavel 4–6, 7–6^{(7–2)}, [10–7] in the final.

== Seeds ==
1. (India) Arjun Kadhe / (Ukraine) Denys Molchanov (quarterfinals)
2. (Bulgaria) Alexander Donski / (Slovakia) Miloš Karol (quarterfinals)
3. (Poland) Szymon Kielan / (Poland) Filip Pieczonka (quarterfinals)
4. (Germany) Andreas Mies / (Spain) David Vega Hernández (first round)

== Draw ==
Key

- Q = Qualifier
- WC = Wild card
- LL = Lucky loser
- Alt = Alternate
- ITF = ITF entry
- PR = Protected ranking
- SR = Special ranking
- SE = Special exempt
- JE = Junior exempt
- JR = Junior Accelerator Programme entrant
- CO = College Accelerator Programme entrant
- NG = Next Gen Accelerator Program entrant
- w/o = Walkover
- r = Retired
- d = Defaulted

=== Draw ===
First round
1	(India) A Kadhe (Ukraine) D Molchanov	6^{5}	6	[15]
(Uruguay) I Carou (Bolivia) M Dellien	7^{7}	1	[13]
(Italy) F Agamenone (Uruguay) F Roncadelli	5	6	[10]
WC	(Bulgaria) Viktor Kirov (Bulgaria) A Vasilev	7	2	[7]
4	(Germany) A Mies (Spain) D Vega Hernández	1	3
(Austria) D Pichler (Croatia) N Serdarušić	6	6
(India) A Kalyanpur (India) Parikshit Somani	w/o
(Ecuador) Á Guillén Meza (Argentina) L Midón
(Netherlands) M Hermans (Portugal) T Pereira	6	7^{9}
WC	(Bulgaria) Y Milev (Bulgaria) P Nesterov	4	6^{7}
(Serbia) S Latinović; M Sharipov	6^{8}	3
3	(Poland) S Kielan (Poland) F Pieczonka	7^{10}	6
(Croatia) D Ajduković (Croatia) A Kalender	4	6	[8]
(Romania) A Jecan (Romania) B Pavel	6	3	[10]
(India) SDP Dev (India) Nitin Kumar Sinha	2	4
2	(Bulgaria) A Donski (Slovakia) M Karol	6	6

Quarterfinals
1	(India) A Kadhe (Ukraine) D Molchanov	6^{7}	4
(Italy) F Agamenone (Uruguay) F Roncadelli	7^{9}	6
(Austria) D Pichler (Croatia) N Serdarušić	6	6
(India) A Kalyanpur (India) P Somani	2	3
(Netherlands) M Hermans (Portugal) T Pereira	6	6^{6}	[10]
3	(Poland) S Kielan (Poland) F Pieczonka	3	7^{8}	[4]
(Romania) A Jecan (Romania) B Pavel	3	6	[10]
2	(Bulgaria) A Donski (Slovakia) M Karol	6	3	[8]

Semifinals
(Italy) F Agamenone (Uruguay) F Roncadelli	1	6	[5]
(Austria) D Pichler (Croatia) N Serdarušić	6	4	[10]
(Netherlands) M Hermans (Portugal) T Pereira	6^{4}	7^{8}	[5]
(Romania) A Jecan (Romania) B Pavel	7^{7}	6^{6}	[10]

Final
(Austria) D Pichler (Croatia) N Serdarušić	4	7^{7}	[10]
(Romania) A Jecan (Romania) B Pavel	6	6^{2}	[7]
