= 2024 Dobrich Challenger – Singles =

Singles
- 2024 Dobrich Challenger

Final
- Champion: (Argentina) Juan Bautista Torres
- Runner-up: Ivan Gakhov
- Score: 5–7, 6–0, 7–5

Events
Singles	Doubles
- Dobrich Challenger

This was the first edition of the tournament.

Juan Bautista Torres won the title after defeating Ivan Gakhov 5–7, 6–0, 7–5 in the final.

== Seeds ==
1. (Turkey) Ergi Kırkın (quarterfinals)
2. (Lebanon) Hady Habib (semifinals)
3. (Germany) Marvin Möller (first round)
4. (France) Gabriel Debru (second round)
5. (Bulgaria) Dimitar Kuzmanov (first round, retired)
6. (Romania) Cezar Crețu (first round)
7. (Czech Republic) Martin Krumich (first round)
8. (Romania) Gabi Adrian Boitan (first round)

== Draw ==
Key

- Q = Qualifier
- WC = Wild card
- LL = Lucky loser
- Alt = Alternate
- ITF = ITF entry
- PR = Protected ranking
- SR = Special ranking
- SE = Special exempt
- JE = Junior exempt
- JR = Junior Accelerator Programme entrant
- CO = College Accelerator Programme entrant
- NG = Next Gen Accelerator Program entrant
- w/o = Walkover
- r = Retired
- d = Defaulted

=== Finals ===
Semifinals
(Argentina) Juan Bautista Torres	7	4	6
(France) Arthur Géa	5	6	3
Ivan Gakhov	6	6
2	(Lebanon) Hady Habib	4	4

Final
(Argentina) Juan Bautista Torres	5	6	7
Ivan Gakhov	7	0	5

=== Top half ===
First round
1	(Turkey) E Kırkın	6	7^{7}
(Spain) Carlos López Montagud	3	6^{4}
(Egypt) M Safwat	3	4
(Israel) Y Oliel	6	6
(Italy) J Berrettini	6	1	4
Q	(Bulgaria) A Donski	4	6	6
(Argentina) JB Torres	7^{7}	6
8	(Romania) GA Boitan	6^{4}	4
4	(France) G Debru	6	6
(Argentina) GA Olivieri	4	2
Q	(Germany) C Negritu	6	6
(Croatia) N Serdarušić	3	4
Q	(Slovakia) A Martin	4	7^{7}	1
(France) A Géa	6	6^{3}	6
(Netherlands) J Sels	3	6	6
7	(Czech Republic) M Krumich	6	2	3

Second round
1	(Turkey) E Kırkın	4	6	6
(Israel) Y Oliel	6	4	4
Q	(Bulgaria) A Donski	3	6	3
(Argentina) JB Torres	6	1	6
4	(France) G Debru	2	6	5
Q	(Germany) C Negritu	6	4	7
(France) A Géa	6	6
(Netherlands) J Sels	3	2

Quarterfinals
1	(Turkey) E Kırkın	6^{4}	4
(Argentina) JB Torres	7^{7}	6
Q	(Germany) C Negritu	4	5
(France) A Géa	6	7

Semifinals
(Argentina) JB Torres	7	4	6
(France) A Géa	5	6	3

=== Bottom half ===
First round
6	(Romania) C Crețu	0	6^{3}
WC	(Bulgaria) P Nesterov	6	7^{7}
WC	(Bulgaria) Y Milev	3	4
(Spain) N Sánchez Izquierdo	6	6
(Argentina) V Aboian	5	6	7^{7}
Q	(Bulgaria) Nikolay Nedelchev	7	4	6^{0}
I Gakhov	6	6
3	(Germany) M Möller	1	4
5	(Bulgaria) D Kuzmanov	3	0^{r}
(Latvia) R Strombachs	6	1
Q	(Argentina) LE Ambrogi	4	6	6
Q	(Bosnia and Herzegovina) M Bašić	6	4	1
(Tunisia) M Echargui	3	6	7^{7}
WC	(Bulgaria) A Genov	6	4	6^{3}
(France) L Pavlovic	5	3
2	(Lebanon) H Habib	7	6

Second round
WC	(Bulgaria) P Nesterov	6	6
(Spain) N Sánchez Izquierdo	1	2
(Argentina) V Aboian	6	4	2
I Gakhov	4	6	6
(Latvia) R Strombachs	6^{5}	4
Q	(Argentina) LE Ambrogi	7^{7}	6
(Tunisia) M Echargui	4	6	6^{7}
2	(Lebanon) H Habib	6	3	7^{9}

Quarterfinals
WC	(Bulgaria) P Nesterov	6	4	4
I Gakhov	2	6	6
Q	(Argentina) LE Ambrogi	4	6^{5}
2	(Lebanon) H Habib	6	7^{7}

Semifinals
I Gakhov	6	6
2	(Lebanon) H Habib	4	4
