= 2025 Izida Cup II =

- Date: 18–23 August
- Edition: 4th
- Surface: Clay
- Location: Sofia, Bulgaria

Champions

Singles
- (Slovakia) Alex Molčan

Doubles
- (Austria) David Pichler / (Croatia) Nino Serdarušić
- Izida Cup

The 2025 Genesis Cup II (formerly the Izida Cup II) was a professional tennis tournament played on clay courts. It was the fourth edition of the tournament which was part of the 2025 ATP Challenger Tour. It took place in Sofia, Bulgaria between 18 and 23 August 2025.

== Singles main-draw entrants ==
=== Seeds ===
Country	Player	Rank^{1}	Seed
~~ARG~~	~~Federico Coria~~	~~153~~	~~1~~
ECU	Álvaro Guillén Meza	244	2
~~BIH~~	~~Nerman Fatić~~	~~247~~	~~3~~
	Ivan Gakhov	251	4
POR	Frederico Ferreira Silva	258	5
CRO	Matej Dodig	259	6
BUL	Dimitar Kuzmanov	260	7
CRO	Duje Ajduković	262	8

- ^{1} Rankings were as of 4 August 2025.

=== Other entrants ===
The following players received wildcards into the singles main draw:

- (Bulgaria) Alexander Donski
- (Bulgaria) Ivan Ivanov
- (Bulgaria) Alexander Vasilev

The following player received entry into the singles main draw through the Junior Accelerator programme:

- (Japan) Naoya Honda

The following player received entry into the singles main draw through the Next Gen Accelerator programme:

- (Austria) Joel Schwärzler

The following players received entry into the singles main draw as alternates:

- (Slovakia) Miloš Karol
- (Bosnia and Herzegovina) Andrej Nedić
- (India) Aryan Shah

The following players received entry from the qualifying draw:

- (Italy) Franco Agamenone
- (United States) Dali Blanch
- (Spain) David Jordà Sanchis
- (Slovakia) Alex Molčan
- (Uruguay) Franco Roncadelli
- (Croatia) Nino Serdarušić

The following players received entry as lucky losers:

- (Italy) Federico Bondioli
- (Poland) Filip Pieczonka

== Champions ==
=== Singles ===
- (Slovakia) Alex Molčan def. (Austria) Joel Schwärzler 7–5, 6–4.

=== Doubles ===
- (Austria) David Pichler / (Croatia) Nino Serdarušić def. (Romania) Alexandru Jecan / (Romania) Bogdan Pavel 4–6, 7–6^{(7–2)}, [10–7].
