= 2024 Dobrich Challenger – Doubles =

Doubles
- 2024 Dobrich Challenger

Final
- Champions: (Peru) Alexander Merino (Germany) Christoph Negritu
- Runners-up: (Romania) Victor Vlad Cornea (Turkey) Ergi Kırkın
- Score: 6–4, 6–2

Events
| Singles | Doubles |
- Dobrich Challenger

This was the first edition of the tournament.

Alexander Merino and Christoph Negritu won the title after defeating Victor Vlad Cornea and Ergi Kırkın 6–4, 6–2 in the final.

== Seeds ==
1. (Brazil) Luís Britto / (Bulgaria) Alexander Donski (semifinals)
2. (Austria) David Pichler / (Czech Republic) Matěj Vocel (quarterfinals)
3. (Romania) Victor Vlad Cornea / (Turkey) Ergi Kırkın (final)
4. (Lebanon) Hady Habib / (Romania) Bogdan Pavel (first round)

== Draw ==
Key

- Q = Qualifier
- WC = Wild card
- LL = Lucky loser
- Alt = Alternate
- ITF = ITF entry
- PR = Protected ranking
- SR = Special ranking
- SE = Special exempt
- JE = Junior exempt
- JR = Junior Accelerator Programme entrant
- CO = College Accelerator Programme entrant
- NG = Next Gen Accelerator Program entrant
- w/o = Walkover
- r = Retired
- d = Defaulted

=== Draw ===
First round
1 | (Brazil) L Britto (Bulgaria) A Donski | 6 | 6
WC | (Bulgaria) Viktor Kirov (Poland) Marcel Zieliński | 1 | 1
(Argentina) LE Ambrogi (Egypt) M Safwat | 3 | 5
(Tunisia) M Echargui (Netherlands) J Sels | 6 | 7
3 | (Romania) V Cornea (Turkey) E Kırkın | 7^{7} | 6
(Argentina) V Aboian (France) L Pavlovic | 6^{3} | 3
(Spain) Carlos López Montagud (Spain) N Sánchez Izquierdo | 7 | 7^{7}
(Bulgaria) Y Milev (Bulgaria) P Nesterov | 5 | 6^{4}
WC | (Bulgaria) Dinko Dinev (Bulgaria) Nikolay Nedelchev | 6 | 6
(France) G Debru (France) A Géa | 4 | 2
(Peru) A Merino (Germany) C Negritu | 6 | 6
4 | (Lebanon) H Habib (Romania) B Pavel | 3 | 3
(Israel) Y Oliel (Latvia) R Strombachs | 6^{4} | 6 | [7]
(Bulgaria) A Genov (Ukraine) V Orlov | 7^{7} | 3 | [10]
Alt | (Argentina) Thiago Cigarrán (Argentina) GA Olivieri | 6^{5} | 4
2 | (Austria) D Pichler (Czech Republic) M Vocel | 7^{7} | 6

Quarterfinals
1 | (Brazil) L Britto (Bulgaria) A Donski | 6 | 6
(Tunisia) M Echargui (Netherlands) J Sels | 2 | 4
3 | (Romania) V Cornea (Turkey) E Kırkın | 7^{8} | 3 | [10]
(Spain) C López Montagud (Spain) N Sánchez Izquierdo | 6^{6} | 6 | [3]
WC | (Bulgaria) D Dinev (Bulgaria) N Nedelchev | 7^{8} | 4 | [8]
(Peru) A Merino (Germany) C Negritu | 6^{6} | 6 | [10]
(Bulgaria) A Genov (Ukraine) V Orlov | 6 | 6^{5} | [22]
2 | (Austria) D Pichler (Czech Republic) M Vocel | 3 | 7^{7} | [20]

Semifinals
1 | (Brazil) L Britto (Bulgaria) A Donski | 3 | 1
3 | (Romania) V Cornea (Turkey) E Kırkın | 6 | 6
(Peru) A Merino (Germany) C Negritu | 6 | 3 | [10]
(Bulgaria) A Genov (Ukraine) V Orlov | 2 | 6 | [7]

Final
3 | (Romania) V Cornea (Turkey) E Kırkın | 4 | 2
(Peru) A Merino (Germany) C Negritu | 6 | 6
