= 2025 Open Città della Disfida =

- Date: 31 March – 6 April
- Edition: 25th
- Surface: Clay
- Location: Barletta, Italy

Champions

Singles
- (Czech Republic) Dalibor Svrčina

Doubles
- (Peru) Alexander Merino / (Germany) Christoph Negritu
- Open Città della Disfida

The 2025 Open Città della Disfida Trofeo Lapietra was a professional tennis tournament played on clay courts. It was the 25th edition of the tournament which was part of the 2025 ATP Challenger Tour. It took place in Barletta, Italy between 31 March and 6 April 2025.

== Singles main-draw entrants ==
=== Seeds ===
Country	Player	Rank^{1}	Seed
FRA	Valentin Royer	121	1
FRA	Grégoire Barrère	157	2
CZE	Dalibor Svrčina	165	3
CRO	Duje Ajduković	167	4
GBR	Dan Evans	183	5
BEL	Gauthier Onclin	211	6
GBR	Paul Jubb	217	7
UZB	Khumoyun Sultanov	221	8

- ^{1} Rankings are as of 17 March 2025.

=== Other entrants ===
The following players received wildcards into the singles main draw:

- (Italy) Pierluigi Basile
- (Italy) Jacopo Berrettini
- (Italy) Marco Cecchinato

The following player received entry into the singles main draw as a special exempt:

- (Czech Republic) Dalibor Svrčina

The following players received entry from the qualifying draw:

- (France) Lilian Marmousez
- (Portugal) Tiago Pereira
- (Croatia) Dino Prižmić
- (Ukraine) Vitaliy Sachko
- (Netherlands) Jelle Sels
- (Italy) Jacopo Vasamì

The following player received entry as a lucky loser:

- (Italy) Andrea Picchione

== Champions ==
=== Singles ===
- (Czech Republic) Dalibor Svrčina def. (Ukraine) Vitaliy Sachko 7–5, 6–3.

=== Doubles ===
- (Peru) Alexander Merino / (Germany) Christoph Negritu def. (Netherlands) Mats Hermans / (Portugal) Tiago Pereira 7–6^{(7–5)}, 6–2.
