= 2024 Dobrich Challenger II =

- Date: 9–14 September
- Edition: 2nd
- Surface: Clay
- Location: Dobrich, Bulgaria

Champions

Singles
- (Netherlands) Guy den Ouden

Doubles
- (Canada) Liam Draxl / (Canada) Cleeve Harper
- Dobrich Challenger

The 2024 Izida Cup II was a professional tennis tournament played on clay courts. It was the second edition of the tournament which was part of the 2024 ATP Challenger Tour. It took place in Dobrich, Bulgaria between 9 and 14 September 2024.

== Singles main-draw entrants ==
=== Seeds ===
Country	Player	Rank^{1}	Seed
FRA	Valentin Royer	200	1
~~ITA~~	~~Stefano Travaglia~~	~~214~~	~~2~~
GBR	Oliver Crawford	225	3
CAN	Liam Draxl	263	4
ITA	Francesco Maestrelli	269	5
ITA	Lorenzo Giustino	275	6
ITA	Enrico Dalla Valle	280	7
FRA	Clément Tabur	292	8
BUL	Dimitar Kuzmanov	317	9

- ^{1} Rankings were as of 26 August 2024.

=== Other entrants ===
The following players received wildcards into the singles main draw:

- (Bulgaria) Dinko Dinev
- (Bulgaria) Alexander Donski
- (Bulgaria) Ivan Ivanov

The following player received entry into the singles main draw as an alternate:

- (Argentina) Genaro Alberto Olivieri

The following players received entry from the qualifying draw:

- (Spain) Max Alcalá Gurri
- (Belgium) Kimmer Coppejans
- (Portugal) Frederico Ferreira Silva
- (Germany) Christoph Negritu
- (Italy) Filippo Romano
- (Latvia) Robert Strombachs

== Champions ==
=== Singles ===
- (Netherlands) Guy den Ouden def. (Netherlands) Jelle Sels 6–2, 6–3.

=== Doubles ===
- (Canada) Liam Draxl / (Canada) Cleeve Harper def. (Italy) Francesco Maestrelli / (Italy) Filippo Romano 6–1, 3–6, [12–10].
