= 2025 Open Città della Disfida – Doubles =

Doubles
- 2025 Open Città della Disfida

Final
- Champions: (Peru) Alexander Merino (Germany) Christoph Negritu
- Runners-up: (Netherlands) Mats Hermans (Portugal) Tiago Pereira
- Score: 7–6^{(7–5)}, 6–2

Events
Singles	Doubles
- Open Città della Disfida

Zdeněk Kolář and Tseng Chun-hsin were the defending champions but chose not to defend their title.

Alexander Merino and Christoph Negritu won the title after defeating Mats Hermans and Tiago Pereira 7–6^{(7–5)}, 6–2 in the final.

== Seeds ==
1. (Finland) Patrik Niklas-Salminen / (Austria) David Pichler (quarterfinals)
2. (Slovakia) Miloš Karol / (Ukraine) Vitaliy Sachko (semifinals)
3. (Serbia) Ivan Sabanov / (Serbia) Matej Sabanov (first round)
4. (Peru) Alexander Merino / (Germany) Christoph Negritu (champions)

== Draw ==
Key

- Q = Qualifier
- WC = Wild card
- LL = Lucky loser
- Alt = Alternate
- ITF = ITF entry
- PR = Protected ranking
- SR = Special ranking
- SE = Special exempt
- JE = Junior exempt
- JR = Junior Accelerator Programme entrant
- CO = College Accelerator Programme entrant
- NG = Next Gen Accelerator Program entrant
- w/o = Walkover
- r = Retired
- d = Defaulted

=== Draw ===
First round
1	(Finland) P Niklas-Salminen (Austria) D Pichler	6	6
(France) R Bertrand (France) M Janvier	0	1
WC	(Italy) M Cecchinato (Italy) E Dalla Valle	6	3	[3]
(Netherlands) M Hermans (Portugal) T Pereira	3	6	[10]
3	(Serbia) I Sabanov (Serbia) M Sabanov	6	4	[8]
WC	(Italy) Simone Agostini (Italy) G Cadenasso	0	6	[10]
(Ukraine) D Molchanov (Croatia) M Poljičak	7^{7}	4	[8]
(India) S Banthia (Bulgaria) A Donski	6^{5}	6	[10]
(Netherlands) T Loof (Netherlands) J Sels	6	6
(Belgium) M Geerts (Italy) L Giustino	3	3
(Italy) F Agamenone (Romania) A Jecan	6^{6}	2
4	(Peru) A Merino (Germany) C Negritu	7^{8}	6
(Italy) F Maestrelli (Italy) F Romano	4	5
(Bulgaria) A Genov (Spain) B Pujol Navarro	6	7
(Canada) K Stevenson (Italy) Augusto Virgili	6^{2}	2
2	(Slovakia) M Karol (Ukraine) V Sachko	7^{7}	6

Quarterfinals
1	(Finland) P Niklas-Salminen (Austria) D Pichler	5	2
(Netherlands) M Hermans (Portugal) T Pereira	7	6
WC	(Italy) S Agostini (Italy) G Cadenasso	6	4
(India) S Banthia (Bulgaria) A Donski	2	4^{d}
(Netherlands) T Loof (Netherlands) J Sels	4	6	[2]
4	(Peru) A Merino (Germany) C Negritu	6	4	[10]
(Bulgaria) A Genov (Spain) B Pujol Navarro	2	4
2	(Slovakia) M Karol (Ukraine) V Sachko	6	6

Semifinals
(Netherlands) M Hermans (Portugal) T Pereira	2
WC	(Italy) S Agostini (Italy) G Cadenasso	0^{r}
4	(Peru) A Merino (Germany) C Negritu	6	6
2	(Slovakia) M Karol (Ukraine) V Sachko	4	1

Final
(Netherlands) M Hermans (Portugal) T Pereira	6^{5}	2
4	(Peru) A Merino (Germany) C Negritu	7^{7}	6
