= 2025 Izida Cup =

- Date: 11–16 August
- Edition: 3rd
- Surface: Clay
- Location: Sofia, Bulgaria

Champions

Singles
- (Czech Republic) Zdeněk Kolář

Doubles
- (Serbia) Stefan Latinović / Marat Sharipov
- Izida Cup

The 2025 Genesis Cup (formerly the Izida Cup) was a professional tennis tournament played on clay courts. It was the third edition of the tournament which was part of the 2025 ATP Challenger Tour. It took place in Sofia, Bulgaria between 11 and 16 August 2025.

== Singles main-draw entrants ==
=== Seeds ===
Country	Player	Rank^{1}	Seed
BIH	Nerman Fatić	247	1
CRO	Duje Ajduković	262	2
ROU	Filip Cristian Jianu	266	3
ARG	Lautaro Midón	274	4
	Marat Sharipov	277	5
BOL	Murkel Dellien	287	6
ESP	Daniel Rincón	290	7
SUI	Mika Brunold	296	8

- ^{1} Rankings were as of 4 August 2025.

=== Other entrants ===
The following players received wildcards into the singles main draw:

- (Bulgaria) Alexander Donski
- (Bulgaria) Ivan Ivanov
- (Bulgaria) Alexander Vasilev

The following player received entry into the singles main draw through the Junior Accelerator programme:

- (Japan) Naoya Honda

The following player received entry into the singles main draw through the Next Gen Accelerator programme:

- (India) Aryan Shah

The following players received entry from the qualifying draw:

- (Romania) Ștefan Adrian Andreescu
- (United States) Dali Blanch
- (Romania) Sebastian Gima
- (Bulgaria) Viktor Markov
- (Bulgaria) Anas Mazdrashki
- (Sweden) Olle Wallin

== Champions ==
=== Singles ===
- (Czech Republic) Zdeněk Kolář def. (Bolivia) Murkel Dellien 6–2, 6–2.

=== Doubles ===
- (Serbia) Stefan Latinović / Marat Sharipov def. (Slovakia) Miloš Karol / (Finland) Patrik Niklas-Salminen 6–3, 2–6, [13–11].
