= 2024 Dobrich Challenger =

- Date: 19–24 August
- Edition: 1st
- Surface: Clay
- Location: Dobrich, Bulgaria

Champions

Singles
- (Argentina) Juan Bautista Torres

Doubles
- (Peru) Alexander Merino / (Germany) Christoph Negritu
- Dobrich Challenger

The 2024 Izida Cup was a professional tennis tournament played on clay courts. It was the first edition of the tournament which was part of the 2024 ATP Challenger Tour. It took place in Dobrich, Bulgaria between 19 and 24 August 2024.

== Singles main-draw entrants ==
=== Seeds ===
Country	Player	Rank^{1}	Seed
TUR	Ergi Kırkın	268	1
LIB	Hady Habib	271	2
GER	Marvin Möller	303	3
FRA	Gabriel Debru	308	4
BUL	Dimitar Kuzmanov	312	5
ROU	Cezar Crețu	315	6
CZE	Martin Krumich	316	7
ROU	Gabi Adrian Boitan	328	8

- ^{1} Rankings were as of 12 August 2024.

=== Other entrants ===
The following players received wildcards into the singles main draw:

- (Bulgaria) Anthony Genov
- (Bulgaria) Yanaki Milev
- (Bulgaria) Petr Nesterov

The following players received entry from the qualifying draw:

- (Argentina) Luciano Emanuel Ambrogi
- (Bosnia and Herzegovina) Mirza Bašić
- (Bulgaria) Alexander Donski
- (Slovakia) Andrej Martin
- (Bulgaria) Nikolay Nedelchev
- (Germany) Christoph Negritu

== Champions ==
=== Singles ===
- (Argentina) Juan Bautista Torres def. Ivan Gakhov 5–7, 6–0, 7–5.

=== Doubles ===
- (Peru) Alexander Merino / (Germany) Christoph Negritu def. (Romania) Victor Vlad Cornea / (Turkey) Ergi Kırkın 6–4, 6–2.
