= 2025 Davis Cup World Group I =

Tennis competition

The 2025 Davis Cup World Group I was held from 12 to 13 September 2025. The thirteen winners of this round will qualify for the 2026 Davis Cup Qualifiers first round while the thirteen losers will play at the 2026 Davis Cup World Group I play-offs.

== Teams ==
Twenty-six teams will participate in the World Group I, in series decided on a home and away basis.

These twenty-six teams are:

- 13 losing teams from the Qualifiers first round, held in January–February 2025
- 13 winning teams from the World Group I play-offs, held in January–February 2025

The 13 winning teams from the World Group I will play in the Qualifiers first round and the 13 losing teams will play in the World Group I play-offs in 2026.

#: Nations Ranking as of 3 February 2025.

Seeded teams

1. Canada (#6)
2. Finland (#14)
3. Serbia (#15)
4. Great Britain (#16)
5. Chile (#17)
6. Brazil (#19)
7. Slovakia (#21)
8. South Korea (#23)
9. Switzerland (#24)
10. Sweden (#25)
11. Portugal (#26)
12. Chinese Taipei (#27)
13. Bosnia and Herzegovina (#28)

Unseeded teams

- Kazakhstan (#29)
- Israel (#30)
- Peru (#31)
- Norway (#32)
- Turkey (#33)
- Poland (#34)
- Colombia (#35)
- Bulgaria (#36)
- India (#37)
- Ecuador (#38=)
- Greece (#38=)
- Luxembourg (#41)
- Tunisia (#47)

== Results summary ==
Home team	Score	Away team	Location	Venue	Surface
Canada [1]	4–0	Israel	Halifax	Scotiabank Centre	Hard (i)
Bulgaria	3–2	Finland [2]	Plovdiv	TC Lokomotiv	Clay
Serbia [3]	3–1	Turkey	Niš	Čair Sports Center	Hard (i)
Poland	1–3	Great Britain [4]	Gdynia	Polsat Plus Arena Gdynia	Hard (i)
Chile [5]	4–0	Luxembourg	Santiago	Parque Deportivo Estadio Nacional	Clay
Greece	1–3	Brazil [6]	Athens	Athens Olympic Tennis Centre	Hard
Slovakia [7]	3–1	Colombia	Bratislava	Peugeot Arena	Hard (i)
South Korea [8]	3–1	Kazakhstan	Chuncheon	Chuncheon Songam Sports Park Tennis Court	Hard
Switzerland [9]	1–3	India	Biel/Bienne	Swiss Tennis Arena	Hard (i)
Sweden [10]	3–2	Tunisia	Gothenburg	Partille Arena	Hard (i)
Peru	3–1	Portugal [11]	Lima	Club Lawn Tennis de la Exposición	Clay
Chinese Taipei [12]	2–3	Norway	Taipei	Taipei Tennis Centre	Hard (i)
Ecuador	3–2	Bosnia and Herzegovina [13]	Quito	Club Rancho San Francisco	Clay

== Results ==
=== Canada vs. Israel ===
Canada
4
Scotiabank Centre
Halifax, Canada
12–13 September 2025
Hard (i)

Israel
0

			1	2	3
1	(Canada) (Israel)	Gabriel Diallo; Daniel Cukierman	6; 1	6; 2
2	(Canada) (Israel)	Liam Draxl; Orel Kimhi	7^{7} 6^{5}	6; 4
3	(Canada) (Israel)	Liam Draxl / Cleeve Harper; Jordan Hasson / Ofek Shimanov	5; 7	6; 0	6; 4
4	(Canada) (Israel)	Cleeve Harper; Orel Kimhi	6; 3	7^{7} 6^{3}
5	(Canada) (Israel)	Liam Draxl; Daniel Cukierman				not played

=== Bulgaria vs. Finland ===
Bulgaria
3
Tennis Club Lokomotiv
Plovdiv, Bulgaria
13–14 September 2025
Clay

Finland
2

			1	2	3
1	(Bulgaria) (Finland)	Alexander Vasilev; Otto Virtanen	6; 3	7; 5
2	(Bulgaria) (Finland)	Ivan Ivanov; Emil Ruusuvuori	2; 6	2; 6
3	(Bulgaria) (Finland)	Alexander Donski / Petr Nesterov; Harri Heliövaara / Otto Virtanen	6; 4	1; 6	7^{7} 6^{1}
4	(Bulgaria) (Finland)	Yanaki Milev; Eero Vasa	2; 6	2; 6
5	(Bulgaria) (Finland)	Alexander Vasilev; Emil Ruusuvuori	7^{7} 6^{5}	6; 4

=== Serbia vs. Turkey ===
Serbia
3
Čair Sports Center
Niš, Serbia
12–13 September 2025
Hard (i)

Turkey
1

			1	2	3
1	(Serbia) (Turkey)	Miomir Kecmanović; Ergi Kırkın	6; 2	6; 2
2	(Serbia) (Turkey)	Hamad Medjedovic; Yankı Erel	6^{7} 7^{9}	7^{8} 6^{6}	3; 1	retired
3	(Serbia) (Turkey)	Ivan Sabanov / Matej Sabanov; Arda Azkara / Ergi Kırkın	4; 6	6; 1	6; 4
4	(Serbia) (Turkey)	Branko Djuric; Arda Azkara	5; 7	7^{7} 6^{3}	7; 10
5	(Serbia) (Turkey)	Hamad Medjedovic; Ergi Kırkın				not played

=== Poland vs. Great Britain ===
Poland
1
Polsat Plus Arena Gdynia
Gdynia, Poland
12–13 September 2025
Hard (i)

Great Britain
3

			1	2	3
1	(Poland) (United Kingdom)	Tomasz Berkieta; Cameron Norrie	6^{9} 7^{11}	4; 6
2	(Poland) (United Kingdom)	Olaf Pieczkowski; Arthur Fery	4; 6	2; 6
3	(Poland) (United Kingdom)	Karol Drzewiecki / Jan Zieliński; Julian Cash / Lloyd Glasspool	3; 6	6; 3	7^{8} 6^{6}
4	(Poland) (United Kingdom)	Olaf Pieczkowski; Cameron Norrie	4; 6	4; 6
5	(Poland) (United Kingdom)	Tomasz Berkieta; Arthur Fery				not played

=== Chile vs. Luxembourg ===
Chile
4
Parque Deportivo Estadio Nacional
Santiago, Chile
13–14 September 2025
Clay

Luxembourg
0

			1	2	3
1	(Chile) (Luxembourg)	Cristian Garín; Aaron Gil Garcia	6; 2	6^{1} 7^{7}	6; 2
2	(Chile) (Luxembourg)	Tomás Barrios Vera; Alex Knaff	6; 1	6; 2
3	(Chile) (Luxembourg)	Tomás Barrios Vera / Matías Soto; Raphaël Calzi / Alex Knaff	6; 2	4; 6	6; 3
4	(Chile) (Luxembourg)	Daniel Antonio Núñez; Louis Van Herck	7^{7} 6^{2}	4; 6	10; 4
5	(Chile) (Luxembourg)	Tomás Barrios Vera; Aaron Gil Garcia				not played

=== Greece vs. Brazil ===
Greece
1
Athens Olympic Tennis Centre
Athens, Greece
13–14 September 2025
Hard

Brazil
3

			1	2	3
1	(Greece) (Brazil)	Stefanos Sakellaridis; João Fonseca	5; 7	3; 6
2	(Greece) (Brazil)	Stefanos Tsitsipas; Thiago Seyboth Wild	6; 2	6; 1
3	(Greece) (Brazil)	Aristotelis Thanos / Petros Tsitsipas; Rafael Matos / Marcelo Melo	2; 6	2; 6
4	(Greece) (Brazil)	Stefanos Tsitsipas; João Fonseca	4; 6	6; 3	5; 7
5	(Greece) (Brazil)	Stefanos Sakellaridis; Thiago Seyboth Wild				not played

=== Slovakia vs. Colombia ===
Slovakia
3
Peugeot Arena
Bratislava, Slovakia
12–13 September 2025
Hard (i)

Colombia
1

			1	2	3
1	(Slovakia) (Colombia)	Alex Molčan; Nicolás Mejía	6; 4	7^{7} 6^{4}
2	(Slovakia) (Colombia)	Lukáš Klein; Adrià Soriano Barrera	6; 3	6^{5} 7^{7}	6^{5} 7^{7}
3	(Slovakia) (Colombia)	Miloš Karol / Lukáš Klein; Nicolás Barrientos / Cristian Rodríguez	6; 4	6; 3
4	(Slovakia) (Colombia)	Norbert Gombos; Nicolás Mejía	6; 4	6; 4
5	(Slovakia) (Colombia)	Alex Molčan; Adrià Soriano Barrera				not played

=== South Korea vs. Kazakhstan ===
South Korea
3
Chuncheon Songam Sports Park
Chuncheon, South Korea
12–13 September 2025
Hard

Kazakhstan
1

			1	2	3
1	(South Korea) (Kazakhstan)	Chung Hyeon; Alexander Shevchenko	4; 6	3; 6
2	(South Korea) (Kazakhstan)	Kwon Soon-woo; Alexander Bublik	7^{8} 6^{6}	3; 0		retired
3	(South Korea) (Kazakhstan)	Nam Ji-sung / Park Ui-sung; Timofey Skatov / Beibit Zhukayev	6; 2	6; 3
4	(South Korea) (Kazakhstan)	Chung Hyeon; Dmitry Popko	6; 3	7; 5
5	(South Korea) (Kazakhstan)	Kwon Soon-woo; Alexander Shevchenko				not played

=== Switzerland vs. India ===
Switzerland
1
Swiss Tennis Arena
Biel/Bienne, Switzerland
12–13 September 2025
Hard (i)

India
3

			1	2	3
1	(Switzerland) (India)	Jérôme Kym; Dhakshineswar Suresh	6^{5} 7^{7}	3; 6
2	(Switzerland) (India)	Marc-Andrea Hüsler; Sumit Nagal	3; 6	6^{4} 7^{7}
3	(Switzerland) (India)	Jakub Paul / Dominic Stricker; Sriram Balaji / Rithvik Choudary Bollipalli	6^{3} 7^{7}	6; 4	7; 5
4	(Switzerland) (India)	Henry Bernet; Sumit Nagal	1; 6	3; 6
5	(Switzerland) (India)	Marc-Andrea Hüsler; Dhakshineswar Suresh				not played

=== Sweden vs. Tunisia ===
Sweden
3
Partille Arena
Gothenburg, Sweden
12–13 September 2025
Hard (i)

Tunisia
2

			1	2	3
1	(Sweden) (Tunisia)	Leo Borg; Moez Echargui	1; 6	1; 6
2	(Sweden) (Tunisia)	Olle Wallin; Aziz Ouakaa	2; 6	7^{7} 6^{3}	6; 1
3	(Sweden) (Tunisia)	André Göransson / Erik Grevelius; Moez Echargui / Aziz Ouakaa	6; 4	7^{7} 6^{3}
4	(Sweden) (Tunisia)	Olle Wallin; Moez Echargui	5; 7	3; 6
5	(Sweden) (Tunisia)	Leo Borg; Aziz Ouakaa	6; 4	6; 3

=== Peru vs. Portugal ===
Peru
3
Lima Club Lawn Tennis de la Exposición
Lima, Peru
12–13 September 2025
Clay

Portugal
1

			1	2	3
1	(Peru) (Portugal)	Gonzalo Bueno; Nuno Borges	3; 6	6; 2	7; 5
2	(Peru) (Portugal)	Ignacio Buse; Jaime Faria	6; 0	6; 2
3	(Peru) (Portugal)	Ignacio Buse / Juan Pablo Varillas; Nuno Borges / Francisco Cabral	5; 7	3; 6
4	(Peru) (Portugal)	Ignacio Buse; Nuno Borges	3; 6	6; 3	6; 2
5	(Peru) (Portugal)	Gonzalo Bueno; Jaime Faria				not played

=== Chinese Taipei vs. Norway ===
Chinese Taipei
2
Taipei Tennis Centre
Taipei, Chinese Taipei
13–14 September 2025
Hard (i)

Norway
3

			1	2	3
1	(Chinese Taipei) (Norway)	Wu Tung-lin; Nicolai Budkov Kjær	6; 4	3; 6	4; 6
2	(Chinese Taipei) (Norway)	Tseng Chun-hsin; Viktor Durasovic	6; 1	6; 1
3	(Chinese Taipei) (Norway)	Ray Ho / Jason Jung; Lukas Hellum Lilleengen / Viktor Durasovic	7^{10} 6^{8}	6; 3
4	(Chinese Taipei) (Norway)	Tseng Chun-hsin; Nicolai Budkov Kjær	6^{2} 7^{7}	4; 6
5	(Chinese Taipei) (Norway)	Wu Tung-lin; Viktor Durasovic	6^{4} 7^{7}	7^{7} 6^{2}	4; 6

=== Ecuador vs. Bosnia and Herzegovina ===
Ecuador
3
Club Rancho San Francisco
Quito, Ecuador
13–14 September 2025
Clay

Bosnia and Herzegovina
2

			1	2	3
1	(Ecuador) (Bosnia and Herzegovina)	Andrés Andrade; Damir Džumhur	6^{13} 7^{15}	1; 6
2	(Ecuador) (Bosnia and Herzegovina)	Álvaro Guillén Meza; Nerman Fatić	6; 4	7^{7} 6^{0}
3	(Ecuador) (Bosnia and Herzegovina)	Gonzalo Escobar / Diego Hidalgo; Mirza Bašić / Nerman Fatić	6^{3} 7^{7}	6^{9} 7^{11}
4	(Ecuador) (Bosnia and Herzegovina)	Álvaro Guillén Meza; Damir Džumhur	6; 2	6; 1
5	(Ecuador) (Bosnia and Herzegovina)	Andrés Andrade; Andrej Nedić	1; 6	6; 3	6; 2
