= 2025 Open Città della Disfida – Singles =

Singles
- 2025 Open Città della Disfida

Final
- Champion: (Czech Republic) Dalibor Svrčina
- Runner-up: (Ukraine) Vitaliy Sachko
- Score: 7–5, 6–3

Events
| Singles | Doubles |
- Open Città della Disfida

Damir Džumhur was the defending champion but chose not to defend his title.

Dalibor Svrčina won the title after defeating Vitaliy Sachko 7–5, 6–3 in the final.

== Seeds ==
1. (France) Valentin Royer (semifinals)
2. (France) Grégoire Barrère (first round)
3. (Czech Republic) Dalibor Svrčina (champion)
4. (Croatia) Duje Ajduković (first round)
5. (United Kingdom) Dan Evans (quarterfinals)
6. (Belgium) Gauthier Onclin (first round)
7. (United Kingdom) Paul Jubb (first round)
8. (Uzbekistan) Khumoyun Sultanov (second round)

== Draw ==
Key

- Q = Qualifier
- WC = Wild card
- LL = Lucky loser
- Alt = Alternate
- ITF = ITF entry
- PR = Protected ranking
- SR = Special ranking
- SE = Special exempt
- JE = Junior exempt
- JR = Junior Accelerator Programme entrant
- CO = College Accelerator Programme entrant
- NG = Next Gen Accelerator Program entrant
- w/o = Walkover
- r = Retired
- d = Defaulted

=== Finals ===
Semifinals
1 | (France) Valentin Royer | 5 | 3
3/SE | (Czech Republic) Dalibor Svrčina | 7 | 6
Q | (Ukraine) Vitaliy Sachko | 6 | 6
(Czech Republic) Maxim Mrva | 2 | 4

Final
3/SE | (Czech Republic) Dalibor Svrčina | 7 | 6
Q | (Ukraine) Vitaliy Sachko | 5 | 3

=== Top half ===
First round
1 | (France) V Royer | 6 | 6
(Jordan) A Shelbayh | 3 | 4
(Netherlands) M Röttgering | 3 | 6 | 1
Q | (Portugal) T Pereira | 6 | 4 | 6
Q | (Croatia) D Prižmić | 6 | 4 | 3
(France) M Janvier | 3 | 6 | 6
(Italy) E Dalla Valle | 2 | 7 | 6
6 | (Belgium) G Onclin | 6 | 5 | 4
3/SE | (Czech Republic) D Svrčina | 6 | 6
(Italy) L Giustino | 3 | 4
Q | (France) Lilian Marmousez | 6 | 7^{7}
WC | (Italy) Pierluigi Basile | 2 | 6^{3}
(France) Mathys Erhard | 4 | 5
(France) R Bertrand | 6 | 7
(Belgium) M Geerts | 6 | 6
7 | (United Kingdom) P Jubb | 2 | 1

Second round
1 | (France) V Royer | 6 | 6
Q | (Portugal) T Pereira | 4 | 3
(France) M Janvier | 6^{6} | 5
(Italy) E Dalla Valle | 7^{8} | 7
3/SE | (Czech Republic) D Svrčina | w/o
Q | (France) L Marmousez
(France) R Bertrand | 1 | 1
(Belgium) M Geerts | 6 | 6

Quarterfinals
1 | (France) V Royer | 7^{7} | 6
(Italy) E Dalla Valle | 6^{2} | 3
3/SE | (Czech Republic) D Svrčina | 6 | 6
(Belgium) M Geerts | 3 | 1

Semifinals
1 | (France) V Royer | 5 | 3
3/SE | (Czech Republic) D Svrčina | 7 | 6

=== Bottom half ===
First round
5 | (United Kingdom) D Evans | 6 | 4 | 6
Q | (Netherlands) J Sels | 3 | 6 | 4
LL | (Italy) Andrea Picchione | 1 | 4
WC | (Italy) J Berrettini | 6 | 6
Q | (Ukraine) V Sachko | 6 | 1 | 7^{8}
Q | (Italy) J Vasamì | 3 | 6 | 6^{6}
(Italy) A Pellegrino | 6 | 6
4 | (Croatia) D Ajduković | 2 | 0
8 | (Uzbekistan) K Sultanov | 2 | 7^{7} | 7
(Ukraine) O Ovcharenko | 6 | 6^{3} | 5
(Croatia) M Dodig | 6 | 1 | 6
WC | (Italy) M Cecchinato | 1 | 6 | 3
(Turkey) E Kırkın | 5 | 6 | 5
(Czech Republic) M Mrva | 7 | 2 | 7
(Croatia) M Poljičak | 2 | 6 | 6
2 | (France) G Barrère | 6 | 0 | 3

Second round
5 | (United Kingdom) D Evans | 6 | 6
WC | (Italy) J Berrettini | 4 | 2
Q | (Ukraine) V Sachko | w/o
(Italy) A Pellegrino
8 | (Uzbekistan) K Sultanov | 4 | 3
(Croatia) M Dodig | 6 | 6
(Czech Republic) M Mrva | 6 | 7
(Croatia) M Poljičak | 0 | 5

Quarterfinals
5 | (United Kingdom) D Evans | 4 | 6 | 3
Q | (Ukraine) V Sachko | 6 | 4 | 6
(Croatia) M Dodig | 6 | 1 | 2
(Czech Republic) M Mrva | 2 | 6 | 6

Semifinals
Q | (Ukraine) V Sachko | 6 | 6
(Czech Republic) M Mrva | 2 | 4
