= 2026 Davis Cup Qualifiers first round =

Men's tennis tournament qualifiers

The 2026 Davis Cup qualifiers first round was held from 5 to 8 February 2026. The thirteen winners of this round qualified for the 2026 Davis Cup Qualifiers second round while the thirteen losers play at the 2026 Davis Cup World Group I.

== Teams ==
Twenty-six teams will play for thirteen spots in the Qualifiers second Round, in series decided on a home and away basis.

These twenty-six teams are:

- 6 teams from the 2025 Finals, excluding the Finals host nation and defending champion Italy and runner-up Spain
- 7 losing teams from the 2025 Davis Cup Qualifiers second round
- 13 winning teams from the 2025 World Group I

The 13 winning teams will play at the Qualifiers second round and the 13 losing teams will play at the World Group I.

#: Nations Ranking as of 24 November 2025.

Seeded teams

1. Germany (#2)
2. Australia (#4)
3. Belgium (#5)
4. Netherlands (#6)
5. United States (#7)
6. France (#8)
7. Canada (#9)
8. Czech Republic (#10)
9. Argentina (#10)
10. Austria (#12)
11. Great Britain (#13)
12. Croatia (#14)
13. Serbia (#15)

Unseeded teams

- Hungary (#16)
- Brazil (#18)
- Chile (#19)
- Denmark (#20)
- Slovakia (#21)
- South Korea (#22)
- Japan (#23)
- Sweden (#24)
- Norway (#26)
- Peru (#29)
- India (#33)
- Bulgaria (#34)
- Ecuador (#37)

== Results summary ==
Home team	Score	Away team	Location	Venue	Surface
Germany [1]	4–0	Peru	Düsseldorf	Castello Düsseldorf	Hard (i)
Ecuador	3–1	Australia [2]	Quito	Quito Tennis and Golf Club	Clay
Bulgaria	0–4	Belgium [3]	Plovdiv	Kolodruma	Clay (i)
India	3–2	Netherlands [4]	Bengaluru	Karnataka State Lawn Tennis Association	Hard
Hungary	0–4	United States [5]	Tatabánya	Multifunkcionális Sportcsarnok	Clay (i)
France [6]	3–1	Slovakia	Le Portel	Le Chaudron	Hard (i)
Canada [7]	3–2	Brazil	Vancouver	Thunderbird Sports Centre	Hard (i)
Czechia [8]	3–1	Sweden	Jihlava	Horácká aréna	Hard (i)
South Korea	3–2	Argentina [9]	Busan	Gijang Stadium	Hard (i)
Japan	2–3	Austria [10]	Tokyo	Ariake Coliseum	Hard (i)
Norway	0–4	Great Britain [11]	Bekkestua	Nadderud Arena	Hard (i)
Croatia [12]	3–1	Denmark	Varaždin	Varaždin Arena	Hard (i)
Chile	4–0	Serbia [13]	Santiago	Estadio Nacional	Clay

== Results ==
=== Germany vs. Peru ===
Germany
4
Castello Düsseldorf, Düsseldorf, Germany
6–7 February 2026
Hard (i)

Peru
0

			1	2	3
1	(Germany) (Peru)	Yannick Hanfmann; Gonzalo Bueno	6; 4	6; 4
2	(Germany) (Peru)	Jan-Lennard Struff; Juan Pablo Varillas	6; 4	6; 2
3	(Germany) (Peru)	Kevin Krawietz / Tim Pütz; Ignacio Buse / Arklon Huertas del Pino	6; 0	2; 6	6; 4
4	(Germany) (Peru)	Justin Engel; Gonzalo Bueno	6; 3	6^{4} 7^{7}	10; 6
5	(Germany) (Peru)	Yannick Hanfmann; Juan Pablo Varillas				not played

=== Ecuador vs. Australia ===
Ecuador
3
Quito Tennis and Golf Club, Quito, Ecuador
7–8 February 2026
Clay

Australia
1

			1	2	3
1	(Ecuador) (Australia)	Álvaro Guillén Meza; Rinky Hijikata	6; 4	1; 6	6; 4
2	(Ecuador) (Australia)	Andrés Andrade; James Duckworth	3; 6	6; 3	7; 5
3	(Ecuador) (Australia)	Gonzalo Escobar / Diego Hidalgo; Rinky Hijikata / Jordan Thompson	7^{7} 6^{5}	6; 4
4	(Ecuador) (Australia)	Emilio Camacho; Jason Kubler	4; 6	2; 6
5	(Ecuador) (Australia)	Andrés Andrade; Rinky Hijikata				not played

=== Bulgaria vs. Belgium ===
Bulgaria
0
Kolodruma, Plovdiv, Bulgaria
7–8 February 2026
Clay (i)

Belgium
4

			1	2	3
1	(Bulgaria) (Belgium)	Alexander Vasilev; Raphaël Collignon	3; 6	3; 6
2	(Bulgaria) (Belgium)	Iliyan Radulov; Alexander Blockx	7^{7} 6^{3}	4; 6	1; 6
3	(Bulgaria) (Belgium)	Alexander Donski / Petr Nesterov; Sander Gillé / Joran Vliegen	6^{5} 7^{7}	6^{3} 7^{7}
4	(Bulgaria) (Belgium)	Ivan Ivanov; Raphaël Collignon	2; 6	2; 6
5	(Bulgaria) (Belgium)	Alexander Vasilev; Alexander Blockx				not played

=== India vs. Netherlands ===
India
3
Karnataka State Lawn Tennis Association, Bengaluru, India
7–8 February 2026
Hard

Netherlands
2

			1	2	3
1	(India) (Netherlands)	Sumit Nagal; Guy den Ouden	0; 6	6; 4	3; 6
2	(India) (Netherlands)	Dhakshineswar Suresh; Jesper de Jong	6; 4	7; 5
3	(India) (Netherlands)	Yuki Bhambri / Dhakshineswar Suresh; Sander Arends / David Pel	7^{7} 6^{0}	3; 6	7^{7} 6^{1}
4	(India) (Netherlands)	Sumit Nagal; Jesper de Jong	7; 5	1; 6	4; 6
5	(India) (Netherlands)	Dhakshineswar Suresh; Guy den Ouden	6; 4	7^{7} 6^{4}

=== Hungary vs. United States ===
Hungary
0
Multifunkcionális Sportcsarnok, Tatabánya, Hungary
7–8 February 2026
Clay (i)

United States
4

			1	2	3
1	(Hungary) (United States)	Zsombor Piros; Tommy Paul	6^{3} 7^{7}	3; 6
2	(Hungary) (United States)	Fábián Marozsán; Ethan Quinn	6; 3	3; 6	6^{11} 7^{13}
3	(Hungary) (United States)	Fábián Marozsán / Zsombor Piros; Christian Harrison / Austin Krajicek	4; 6	6; 3	3; 6
4	(Hungary) (United States)	Matyas Fuele; Emilio Nava	2; 6	3; 6
5	(Hungary) (United States)	Zsombor Piros; Ethan Quinn				not played

=== France vs. Slovakia ===
France
3
Le Chaudron, Le Portel, France
7–8 February 2026
Hard (i)

Slovakia
1

			1	2	3
1	(France) (Slovakia)	Alexandre Müller; Alex Molčan	4; 6	4; 6
2	(France) (Slovakia)	Arthur Rinderknech; Norbert Gombos	7^{7} 6^{1}	7^{8} 6^{6}
3	(France) (Slovakia)	Benjamin Bonzi / Pierre-Hugues Herbert; Miloš Karol / Lukáš Klein	6; 2	6; 3
4	(France) (Slovakia)	Arthur Rinderknech; Alex Molčan	7; 5	7^{8} 6^{6}
5	(France) (Slovakia)	Alexandre Müller; Norbert Gombos				not played

=== Canada vs. Brazil ===
Canada
3
Thunderbird Sports Centre, Vancouver, Canada
6–7 February 2026
Hard (i)

Brazil
2

			1	2	3
1	(Canada) (Brazil)	Liam Draxl; João Lucas Reis da Silva	6; 3	6; 3
2	(Canada) (Brazil)	Gabriel Diallo; Gustavo Heide	6^{4} 7^{7}	6; 3	6^{3} 7^{7}
3	(Canada) (Brazil)	Liam Draxl / Cleeve Harper; Orlando Luz / Rafael Matos	6; 3	4; 6	5; 7
4	(Canada) (Brazil)	Gabriel Diallo; Matheus Pucinelli de Almeida	3; 6	6; 1	7^{7} 6^{4}
5	(Canada) (Brazil)	Liam Draxl; Gustavo Heide	6; 3	6; 4

=== Czech Republic vs. Sweden ===
Czech Republic
3
Horácká aréna, Jihlava, Czech Republic
7–8 February 2026
Hard (i)

Sweden
1

			1	2	3
1	(Czech Republic) (Sweden)	Jiří Lehečka; Dragoș Nicolae Mădăraș	6; 3	6; 4
2	(Czech Republic) (Sweden)	Dalibor Svrčina; Olle Wallin	6; 1	6; 3
3	(Czech Republic) (Sweden)	Petr Nouza / Patrik Rikl; André Göransson / Erik Grevelius	7^{7} 6^{4}	6^{4} 7^{7}	7^{7} 6^{4}
4	(Czech Republic) (Sweden)	Maxim Mrva; Olle Wallin	4; 6	6^{1} 7^{7}
5	(Czech Republic) (Sweden)	Dalibor Svrčina; Dragoș Nicolae Mădăraș				not played

=== South Korea vs. Argentina ===
South Korea
3
Gijang Stadium, Busan, South Korea
7–8 February 2026
Hard (i)

Argentina
2

			1	2	3
1	(South Korea) (Argentina)	Chung Hyeon; Thiago Agustín Tirante	6; 2	5; 7	6^{5} 7^{7}
2	(South Korea) (Argentina)	Kwon Soon-woo; Marco Trungelliti	7^{8} 6^{6}	6; 2
3	(South Korea) (Argentina)	Nam Ji-sung / Park Ui-sung; Guido Andreozzi / Federico Agustín Gómez	3; 6	5; 7
4	(South Korea) (Argentina)	Kwon Soon-woo; Thiago Agustín Tirante	6; 4	4; 6	6; 3
5	(South Korea) (Argentina)	Chung Hyeon; Marco Trungelliti	6; 4	6; 3

=== Japan vs. Austria ===
Japan
2
Ariake Coliseum, Tokyo, Japan
6–7 February 2026
Hard (i)

Austria
3

			1	2	3
1	(Japan) (Austria)	Yosuke Watanuki; Sebastian Ofner	6; 3	6; 4
2	(Japan) (Austria)	Shintaro Mochizuki; Jurij Rodionov	4; 6	5; 7
3	(Japan) (Austria)	Yosuke Watanuki / Takeru Yuzuki; Alexander Erler / Lucas Miedler	7^{7} 6^{4}	6^{8} 7^{10}	6; 4
4	(Japan) (Austria)	Shintaro Mochizuki; Lukas Neumayer	3; 6	3; 6
5	(Japan) (Austria)	Yoshihito Nishioka; Jurij Rodionov	7; 5	1; 6	0; 6

=== Norway vs. Great Britain ===
Norway
0
Nadderud Arena, Oslo, Norway
5–6 February 2026
Hard (i)

Great Britain
4

			1	2	3
1	(Norway) (United Kingdom)	Viktor Durasovic; Jack Draper	2; 6	2; 6
2	(Norway) (United Kingdom)	Nicolai Budkov Kjær; Cameron Norrie	4; 6	4; 6
3	(Norway) (United Kingdom)	Nicolai Budkov Kjær / Viktor Durasovic; Julian Cash / Lloyd Glasspool	2; 6	6; 2	6^{5} 7^{7}
4	(Norway) (United Kingdom)	Nicolai Budkov Kjær; Jacob Fearnley	6; 3	3; 6	7; 10
5	(Norway) (United Kingdom)	Viktor Durasovic; Cameron Norrie				not played

=== Croatia vs. Denmark ===
Croatia
3
Varaždin Arena, Varaždin, Croatia
6–7 February 2026
Hard (i)

Denmark
1

			1	2	3
1	(Croatia) (Denmark)	Matej Dodig; Elmer Møller	4; 6	6^{3} 7^{7}
2	(Croatia) (Denmark)	Dino Prižmić; August Holmgren	5; 7	6; 0	6; 2
3	(Croatia) (Denmark)	Nikola Mektić / Mate Pavić; Johannes Ingildsen / Carl Emil Overbeck	6; 2	7; 5
4	(Croatia) (Denmark)	Dino Prižmić; Elmer Møller	7^{7} 6^{5}	7^{7} 6^{2}
5	(Croatia) (Denmark)	Matej Dodig; August Holmgren				not played

=== Chile vs. Serbia ===
Chile
4
Estadio Nacional, Santiago, Chile
6–7 February 2026
Clay

Serbia
0

			1	2	3
1	(Chile) (Serbia)	Tomás Barrios Vera; Dušan Lajović	7; 5	7^{9} 6^{7}
2	(Chile) (Serbia)	Alejandro Tabilo; Ognjen Milić	6^{3} 7^{7}	6; 2	6; 4
3	(Chile) (Serbia)	Tomás Barrios Vera / Nicolás Jarry; Ivan Sabanov / Matej Sabanov	6; 4	6; 4
4	(Chile) (Serbia)	Matías Soto; Branko Đurić	6^{2} 7^{7}	7^{7} 6^{4}	10; 7
5	(Chile) (Serbia)	Tomás Barrios Vera; Ognjen Milić				not played
