= Alexander Merino =

Peruvian tennis player

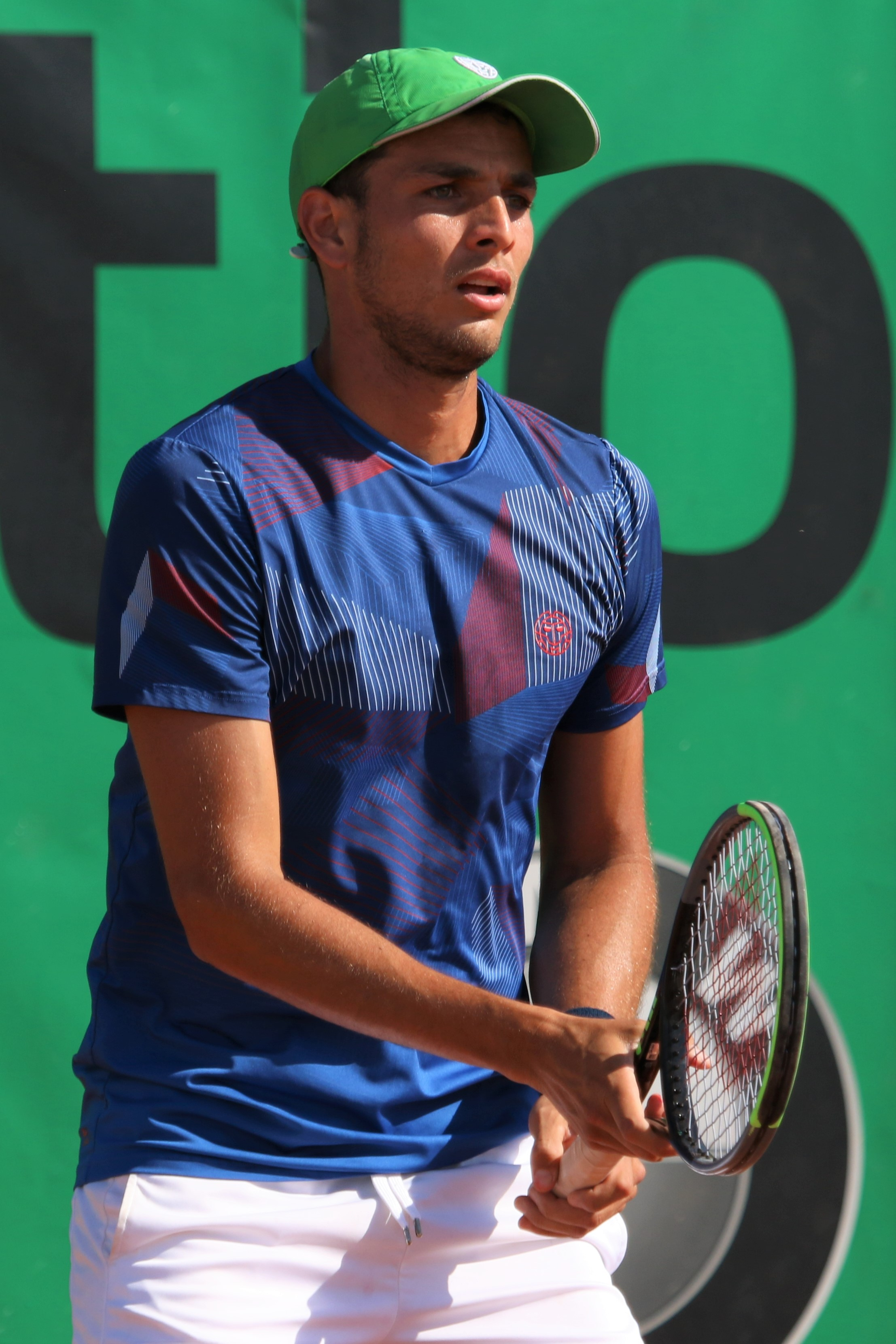
- Merino at the 2022 Internationaux de Tennis de Blois
- Country (sports): Peru
- Born: 31 August 1992 (age 34) Melbourne, Australia
- Height: 1.84 m (6 ft 0 in)
- Plays: Left-handed (two-handed backhand)
- Prize money: $83,406

Singles
- Career record: 0–1 (at ATP Tour level, Grand Slam level, and in Davis Cup)
- Highest ranking: No. 1177 (15 May 2017)

Doubles
- Career record: 0–0 (at ATP Tour level, Grand Slam level, and in Davis Cup)
- Career titles: 5 Challengers, 16 ITF
- Highest ranking: No. 114 (14 July 2025)
- Current ranking: No. 124 (25 August 2025)
- Last updated on: 16 April 2025.

Alexander Merino (born 31 August 1992) is a Peruvian tennis player who specializes in doubles. He has a career high ATP doubles ranking of No. 114 achieved on 14 July 2025.

Merino represents Peru in the Davis Cup. He was first nominated to the team for the 2017 Davis Cup and played a match against Ecuador.

== Career ==
He won his maiden ATP Challenger doubles title at the 2024 Dobrich Challenger with Christoph Negritu.

== ATP Challenger and ITF Tour finals ==
=== Doubles: 50 (21–29) ===
Legend ATP Challenger Tour (5-4) ITF World Tennis Tour (16–25)	Titles by surface Hard (8–12) Clay (13–17) Grass (0–0)

Result	W–L	Date	Tournament	Tier	Surface	Partner	Opponents	Score
Loss	0–1	Aug 2013	İzmir, Turkey F33	Futures	Hard	(France) Melik Feler	(Kyrgyzstan) Daniiar Duldaev (Zimbabwe) Mark Fynn	6–4, 4–6, [6–10]
Win	1–1	Jun 2014	Istanbul, Turkey F22	Futures	Hard	(Greece) Markos Kalovelonis	(Australia) Damian Farinola (Australia) Darren Polkinghorne	3–6, 6–1, [10–8]
Win	2–1	Aug 2015	El Kantaoui, Tunisia F19	Futures	Hard	(Germany) Milen Ianakiev	(Bulgaria) Dimitar Kuzmanov (Spain) David Pérez Sanz	7–5, 1–6, [10–5]
Loss	2–2	Dec 2015	Trujillo, Peru F6	Futures	Clay	(Spain) Jaume Pla Malfeito	(Peru) Duilio Beretta (Argentina) Andrea Collarini	4–6, 3–6
Loss	2–3	Aug 2016	Sharm El Sheikh, Egypt F20	Futures	Hard	(United Kingdom) Imran Aswat	(Australia) Nathan Eshmade (Australia) Bradley Mousley	1–6, 0–6
Loss	2–4	Oct 2016	Cairo, Egypt F26	Futures	Clay	(Germany) Christoph Negritu	(Argentina) Gaston Arturo Grimolizzi (Argentina) Mateo Nicolás Martínez	6–7^{(5–7)}, 6–7^{(1–7)}
Loss	2–5	Nov 2016	Stellenbosch, South Africa F3	Futures	Hard	(Germany) Christoph Negritu	(Hungary) Gábor Borsos (Switzerland) Luca Margaroli	6–7^{(6–8)}, 7–5, [5–10]
Loss	2–6	May 2017	Acre, Israel F5	Futures	Hard	(United States) Michael Zhu	(Switzerland) Raphael Baltensperger (Italy) Liam Caruana	6–7^{(3–7)}, 1–6
Loss	2–7	Jul 2017	Valledupar, Colombia F1	Futures	Hard	(Argentina) Nicolás Alberto Arreche	(Colombia) Juan Sebastián Gómez (Mexico) Luis Patiño	2–6, 6–7^{(4–7)}
Win	3–7	Mar 2018	Hammamet, Tunisia F10	Futures	Clay	(Germany) Christoph Negritu	(Argentina) Hernán Casanova (Argentina) Eduardo Agustín Torre	6–3, 3–6, [10–5]
Loss	3–8	May 2018	Córdoba, Mexico F3	Futures	Hard	(Australia) Edward Bourchier	(United States) Hunter Johnson (United States) Yates Johnson	3–6, 3–6
Win	4–8	Aug 2018	Brussels, Belgium F6	Futures	Clay	(Germany) Christoph Negritu	(France) Joffrey de Schepper (Benin) Alexis Klégou	7–6^{(7–2)}, 6–4
Loss	4–9	Aug 2018	Trier, Germany F11	Futures	Clay	(Germany) Christoph Negritu	(Germany) Benjamin Hassan (Germany) Constantin Schmitz	6–7^{(3–7)}, 6–4, [10–12]
Win	5–9	Aug 2018	Überlingen, Germany F13	Futures	Clay	(Germany) Christoph Negritu	(Germany) Johannes Härteis (Germany) Peter Heller	6–3, 6–4
Win	6–9	Sep 2018	Monastir, Tunisia F30	Futures	Hard	(Germany) Christoph Negritu	(Spain) Jorge Blanco Guadalupe (Italy) Joy Vigani	6–3, 6–1
Loss	6–10	Sep 2018	Monastir, Tunisia F32	Futures	Hard	(Germany) Christoph Negritu	(Tunisia) Anis Ghorbel (Bulgaria) Vasko Mladenov	3–6, 3–6
Win	7–10	Nov 2018	Corrientes, Argentina F7	Futures	Clay	(Argentina) Manuel Peña López	(Argentina) Mariano Kestelboim (Argentina) Agustín Velotti	4–6, 6–4, [10–7]
Loss	7–11	Nov 2018	Río Cuarto, Argentina F9	Futures	Clay	(Peru) Conner Huertas del Pino	(Argentina) Gabriel Alejandro Hidalgo (Argentina) Federico Moreno	6–3, 3–6, [10–12]
Loss	7–12	Mar 2019	M15 Monastir, Tunisia	World Tennis Tour	Hard	(Germany) Christoph Negritu	(Benin) Alexis Klégou (Austria) David Pichler	4–6, 3–6
Win	8–12	Mar 2019	M15 Tabarka, Tunisia	World Tennis Tour	Clay	(Germany) Christoph Negritu	(France) Geoffrey Blancaneaux (France) Clément Tabur	6–2, 6–2
Win	9–12	May 2019	M25 Santa Margherita Di Pula, Italy	World Tennis Tour	Clay	(Argentina) Manuel Peña López	(Turkey) Tuna Altuna (India) Vijay Sundar Prashanth	3–6, 6–4, [10–0]
Loss	9–13	Jun 2019	M25+H Bacău, Romania	World Tennis Tour	Clay	(Argentina) Manuel Peña López	(Chile) Alejandro Tabilo (Peru) Juan Pablo Varillas	6–7^{(5–7)}, 6–7^{(4–7)}
Loss	9–14	Jun 2019	M25 Karlsruhe, Germany	World Tennis Tour	Clay	(Argentina) Manuel Peña López	(Bolivia) Boris Arias (United States) Korey Lovett	3–6, 6–7^{(4–7)}
Win	10–14	Jun 2019	M15 Tabarka, Tunisia	World Tennis Tour	Clay	(Argentina) Manuel Peña López	(Argentina) Nicolás Alberto Arreche (Argentina) Franco Feitt	7–5, 7–6^{(7–4)}
Loss	10–15	Jul 2019	M15 Tabarka, Tunisia	World Tennis Tour	Clay	(Argentina) Manuel Peña López	(Austria) David Pichler (Italy) Alexander Weis	5–7, 5–7
Loss	10–16	Feb 2020	M25 Weston, United States	World Tennis Tour	Clay	(Argentina) Manuel Peña López	(Bolivia) Boris Arias (Brazil) Daniel Dutra da Silva	4–6, 6–7^{(2–7)}
Loss	10–17	Feb 2020	M25 Punta del Este, Uruguay	World Tennis Tour	Clay	(Argentina) Manuel Peña López	(Italy) Franco Agamenone (Brazil) Daniel Dutra da Silva	0–6, 1–6
Loss	10–18	Mar 2020	M25 Cordoba, Argentina	World Tennis Tour	Clay	(Argentina) Manuel Peña López	(Argentina) Tomas Martin Etcheverry (Argentina) Mariano Kestelboim	3–6, 6–1, [2–10]
Loss	10–19	Jul 2021	Todi, Italy	Challenger	Clay	(Argentina) Facundo Díaz Acosta	(Italy) Francesco Forti (Italy) Giulio Zeppieri	3–6, 2–6
Loss	10–20	Mar 2023	M25 Monastir, Tunisia	World Tennis Tour	Hard	(Switzerland) Jakub Paul	(Italy) Luca Potenza (Italy) Samuel Vincent Ruggeri	3–6, 3–6
Loss	10–21	May 2023	M15 Warmbad Villach, Austria	World Tennis Tour	Clay	(Germany) Christoph Negritu	(Austria) Sandro Kopp (Germany) Kai Lemstra	3–6, 4–6
Win	11–21	Jun 2023	M15 Monastir, Tunisia	World Tennis Tour	Hard	(Germany) Christoph Negritu	(France) Arthur Bouquier (France) Raphael Lambling	7–5, 6–1
Loss	11–22	Jun 2023	M15 Monastir, Tunisia	World Tennis Tour	Hard	(Germany) Christoph Negritu	(Brazil) Gilbert Klier Junior (Brazil) Christian Oliveira	5–7, 4–6
Win	12–22	Sep 2023	M15 Allershausen, Germany	World Tennis Tour	Clay	(Germany) Christoph Negritu	(Germany) Florian Broska (Austria) Gregor Ramskogler	6–3, 3–6, [10–3]
Loss	12–23	Nov 2023	M15 Monastir, Tunisia	World Tennis Tour	Hard	(Germany) Christoph Negritu	Egor Agafonov; Bogdan Bobrov	3–6, 6–3, [3–10]
Loss	12–24	Nov 2023	M15 Monastir, Tunisia	World Tennis Tour	Hard	(Germany) Christoph Negritu	(Switzerland) Jakub Paul (Germany) Jakob Schnaitter	6–7^{(5–7)}, 5–7
Win	13–24	Nov 2023	M15 Monastir, Tunisia	World Tennis Tour	Hard	(Germany) Christoph Negritu	(Slovakia) Miloš Karol (Germany) Adrian Oetzbach	6–3, 6–1
Loss	13–25	Feb 2024	M15 Sunrise, United States	World Tennis Tour	Clay	(United States) Harrison Adams	(Ecuador) Andrés Andrade (United States) Alex Rybakov	3–6, 3–6
Win	14–25	Feb 2024	M15 Monastir, Tunisia	World Tennis Tour	Hard	(Germany) Christoph Negritu	(Slovakia) Miloš Karol (Switzerland) Jakub Paul	6–3, 6–3
Win	15–25	Feb 2024	M15 Monastir, Tunisia	World Tennis Tour	Hard	(Germany) Christoph Negritu	(Slovakia) Miloš Karol (Sweden) Fred Simonsson	7–6^{(7–3)}, 6–3
Win	16–25	Mar 2024	M15 Monastir, Tunisia	World Tennis Tour	Hard	(Germany) Christoph Negritu	Igor Kudriashov; Aleksandr Lobanov	7–6^{(7–4)}, 4–6, [10–4]
Loss	16–26	May 2024	M25 Carnac, France	World Tennis Tour	Clay	(Germany) Christoph Negritu	(Argentina) Federico Agustin Gomez (Paraguay) Adolfo Daniel Vallejo	3–6, 5–7
Win	17–26	Aug 2024	Dobrich, Bulgaria	Challenger	Clay	(Germany) Christoph Negritu	(Romania) Victor Vlad Cornea (Turkey) Ergi Kirkin	6–4, 6–2
Win	18–26	Sep 2024	Sibiu, Romania	Challenger	Clay	(Germany) Christoph Negritu	(Canada) Liam Draxl (Canada) Cleeve Harper	6–2, 7–6^{(7–2)}
Win	19–26	Oct 2024	Valencia, Spain	Challenger	Clay	(Germany) Christoph Negritu	(Poland) Karol Drzewiecki (Poland) Piotr Matuszewski	6–3, 6–4
Win	20–26	Feb 2025	Tenerife, Spain	Challenger	Clay	(Germany) Christoph Negritu	(Israel) Daniel Cukierman (United Kingdom) Joshua Paris	2–6, 6–3, [10–8]
Win	21–26	Mar 2025	Barletta, Italy	Challenger	Clay	(Germany) Christoph Negritu	(Netherlands) Mats Hermans (Portugal) Tiago Pereira	7–6^{(7–5)}, 6–2
Loss	21–27	Jul 2025	Braunschweig, Germany	Challenger	Clay	(Germany) Christoph Negritu	(United States) Vasil Kirkov (Netherlands) Bart Stevens	2–6, 3–6
Loss	21–28	Nov 2025	Florianópolis, Brazil	Challenger	Clay	(Germany) Christoph Negritu	(Bolivia) Boris Arias (Denmark) Johannes Ingildsen	6–3, 3–6, [8–10]
Loss	21–29	Oct 2026	Antofagasta, Chile	Challenger	Clay	(Mexico) Alan Magadán	(Brazil) Eduardo Ribeiro (Brazil) Marcelo Zormann	1–6, 3–6
