= Ivan Ivanov (tennis) =

Bulgarian tennis player (born 2008)

- Ivanov at the 2026 Wimbledon Championships
- Country (sports): Bulgaria
- Born: 30 October 2008 (age 18) Varna, Bulgaria
- Height: 1.80 m (5 ft 11 in)
- Turned pro: 2023
- Plays: Right-handed (two-handed backhand)
- Coach: Jeremy Paisan
- Prize money: US $74,155

Singles
- Career record: 0–3 (at ATP Tour level, Grand Slam level, and in Davis Cup)
- Career titles: 0
- Highest ranking: No. 457 (19 October 2026)
- Current ranking: No. 459 (9 November 2026)

Grand Slam singles results
- Wimbledon: Q1 (2026)

Doubles
- Career record: 0–0 (at ATP Tour level, Grand Slam level, and in Davis Cup)
- Career titles: 0
- Highest ranking: No. 2,012 (31 March 2025)
- Last updated on: 9 November 2026.

Ivan Ivanov (Bulgarian: Иван Иванов, [ɪˈvan ɪvaˈnov], born 30 October 2008) is a Bulgarian tennis player. He has a career-high ATP singles ranking of No. 457 achieved on 19 October 2026.

In 2025, Ivanov has won two majors at junior-level – the boys' singles titles at Wimbledon and at the US Open, becoming the second Bulgarian in history after Grigor Dimitrov to lift both trophies in a season.

Ivanov represents Bulgaria at the Davis Cup.

== Junior career ==
In July 2022, Ivanov competed in the inaugural boys' U14 event at Wimbledon, where he lost in the semifinals to the eventual champion, Korean Se Hyuk Cho.

In January 2024, He made his Junior Grand Slam debut at the Australian Open, where he lost in the first round in singles and the second round in doubles.

In April 2025, Ivanov won the boys' singles category at the J300 Tournoi de Tennis ITF Junior in Beaulieu-sur-Mer, France, defeating Ludvig Hede in the final. He also lifted the trophy in doubles, playing with Thijs Boogaard – the pair defeated fourth seeds Alejandro Arcila and Karim Bennani in straight sets. The following month, the Bulgarian was a runner-up at the prestigious J500 Trofeo Bonfiglio in Milan, losing to fifth seed and home favourite Jacopo Vasamì in the final.

In June, Ivanov fell short of reaching his first Junior Grand Slam final, losing to eventual champion Max Schönhaus in the singles semifinals at the French Open, where he also reached the quarterfinals in doubles with Boogaard.

At the 2025 Wimbledon Championships, Ivanov did not lose a set on his way to his first Grand Slam title, defeating 13th seed Schönhaus and then qualifier Ronit Karki in the final. With this feat, he became the second Bulgarian tennis player to win a Junior Grand Slam title, after Grigor Dimitrov, who won Wimbledon and the US Open in 2008. As a result, Ivanov reached an ITF junior combined ranking of No. 1 on 14 July 2025.

As the top seed at the 2025 US Open, Ivanov made a third consecutive semifinal with wins over Maximus Dussault and eighth seed Schönhaus. He reached a consecutive junior final with a win over Kazakh Zangar Nurlanuly in straight sets. He earned the title after defeating compatriot Alexander Vasilev in straight sets. The match made history as the first all-Bulgarian Grand Slam final ever.

In December, Ivanov was named the 2025 world junior champion by the ITF. At 17 years old, he was the first Bulgarian to finish the season as world No. 1 in the junior rankings.

He has won five singles and four doubles junior titles overall and has a Juniors singles win-loss record of 106–35.

== Professional career ==
Ivanov made his professional debut in 2023 at the M15 tournament in Manacor. Later in the year he received a qualifying wildcard for the 2023 Rafa Nadal Open, where he lost in the first round to Dane August Holmgren.

In August 2024, playing only the fifth professional event in his career, Ivanov reached his first ITF final at the M15 tournament in Sofia, but lost to Argentine Franco Ribero. He made his ATP Challenger main draw debut after he received a wildcard for the second edition of the Dobrich Challenger, the 2024 Izida Cup.

In May 2025, Ivanov defeated Gergely Madarász in the final of the M15 tournament in Szentendre, Hungary, becoming the first player born in 2008 to win an ITF Men's Tour title. He made his second main draw debut after receiving a wildcard for the two separate editions of the Sofia Challenger, the 2025 Izida Cup. In June 2025, prior to Wimbledon, Ivanov participated in the warm-up exhibition event, the Liverpool International Tennis Tournament 2025, where he reached the semifinals.

At the end of October 2025, one day after his 17th birthday, Ivanov received a main draw wildcard for his ATP Tour debut at the inaugural Hellenic Championship in Athens. He lost in the first round to qualifier Yannick Hanfmann.

== Performance timeline ==
Key
W	F	SF	QF	#R	RR	Q#	DNQ	A	NH

(W) winner; (F) finalist; (SF) semifinalist; (QF) quarterfinalist; (#R) rounds 4, 3, 2, 1; (RR) round-robin stage; (Q#) qualification round; (DNQ) did not qualify; (A) absent; (NH) not held; (SR) strike rate (events won / competed); (W–L) win–loss record.

=== Singles ===
Current through the 2025 Hellenic Championship.

Tournament	2026	SR	W–L	Win%
Grand Slams
Australian Open	A	0 / 0	0–0	–
French Open	A	0 / 0	0–0	–
Wimbledon	Q1	0 / 0	0–0	–
US Open	A	0 / 0	0–0	–
Win–loss	0–0	0 / 0	0–0	–

== ITF World Tennis Tour finals ==
=== Singles: 5 (2 titles, 3 runner-ups) ===
Legend ITF WTT (2–3)	Finals by surface Hard (0–2) Clay (2–1)

Result	W–L	Date	Tournament	Tier	Surface	Opponent	Score
Loss	0–1	Aug 2024	M15 Sofia, Bulgaria	WTT	Clay	(Argentina) Franco Ribero	7–5, 4–6, 2–6
Win	1–1	May 2025	M15 Szentendre, Hungary	WTT	Clay	(Hungary) Gergely Madarász	7–5, 6–4
Loss	1–2	Jan 2026	M15 Manacor, Spain	WTT	Hard	Yaroslav Demin	2–6, 0–6
Loss	1–3	Jan 2026	M15 Manacor, Spain	WTT	Hard	Yaroslav Demin	1–6, 4–6
Win	2–3	Mar 2026	M25 Tarragona, Spain	WTT	Clay	(Spain) Àlex Martí Pujolràs	6–3, 6–2

== National representation ==
=== Davis Cup: 2 (2 defeats) ===
Ivanov debuted for the Bulgaria Davis Cup team in 2025. Since then he has 3 nominations with 2 ties played; his singles W/L record is 0–2 and doubles W/L record is 0–0 (0–2 overall).

Group membership Finals (–) Qualifying round (0–1) Group I (0–1) Group II (–) Group III (–) Group IV (–)	Matches by surface Hard (–) Clay (0–2) Grass (–)	Matches by type Singles (0–2) Doubles (–)

- ▲ ▼ indicates the result of the Davis Cup match followed by the score, date, place of event, the zonal classification and its phase, and the court surface.

Rubber result	No.	Rubber	Match type (partner if any)	Opponent nation	Opponent player(s)	Score
▲3–2; 13–14 September 2025; Tennis Club Lokomotiv, Plovdiv, Bulgaria; World Group I; Clay surface
Loss	1	II	Singles	Finland	Emil Ruusuvuori	2–6, 2–6
▼0–4; 7–8 February 2026; Kolodruma, Plovdiv, Bulgaria; Qualifiers first round; Clay (i) surface
Loss	2	IV	Singles	Belgium	Raphaël Collignon	2–6, 2–6

== Junior Grand Slam finals ==
=== Singles: 2 (2 titles) ===
Result	Year	Tournament	Surface	Opponent	Score
Win	2025	Wimbledon	Grass	(United States) Ronit Karki	6–2, 6–3
Win	2025	US Open	Hard	(Bulgaria) Alexander Vasilev	7–5, 6–3
