= Alexander Vasilev (tennis) =

Bulgarian tennis player (born 2007)

- Native name: Александър Василев
- Country (sports): Bulgaria
- Born: 14 May 2007 (age 19) Pleven, Bulgaria
- Height: 1.85 m (6 ft 1 in)
- Turned pro: 2022
- Plays: Left-handed (two-handed backhand)
- Coach: Mihail Petrov
- Prize money: US $26,484

Singles
- Career record: 2–1 (at ATP Tour level, Grand Slam level, and in Davis Cup)
- Career titles: 0
- Highest ranking: No. 564 (27 July 2026)
- Current ranking: No. 602 (19 October 2026)

Doubles
- Career record: 0–0 (at ATP Tour level, Grand Slam level, and in Davis Cup)
- Career titles: 0
- Highest ranking: No. 1,263 (19 October 2026)
- Current ranking: No. 1,263 (19 October 2026)
- Last updated on: 19 October 2026.

Alexander Vasilev (Bulgarian: Александър Василев, born 14 May 2007) is a Bulgarian tennis player. He has a career-high ATP singles ranking of No. 564 achieved on 27 July 2026 and a doubles ranking of No. 1,263 achieved on 19 October 2026.

Vasilev was a major jr. runner-up at the 2025 US Open. He represents Bulgaria at the Davis Cup.

== Junior career ==
Vasilev had good results on the ITF junior circuit, maintaining a 120–55 singles win-loss record. In March 2025, he won the J300 Memorial Eduardo Ferrero in Villena, Spain, defeating Karim Bennani in the final.

In May, Vasilev reached the boys' singles quarterfinals at the 2025 French Open, losing to 13th seed Ryo Tabata.

In July, the Bulgarian was a runner-up at the prestigious J300 Roehampton, England, losing to home favourite Oliver Bonding. Later that month, he reached the boys' singles semifinals at Wimbledon, losing to qualifier Ronit Karki.

Later that season, Vasilev advanced to the 2025 US Open final, where he lost to compatriot Ivan Ivanov, in a historic all-Bulgarian junior Grand Slam singles final.

He reached an ITF junior combined ranking of world No. 2 on 8 September 2025.

== Professional career ==
Vasilev made his professional debut in 2022 at the M15 tournament in Sozopol. In August 2025 Vasilev reached his first ITF final at the M15 tournament in Sofia, but lost to Thomas Faurel.

Vasilev made his ATP Challenger main draw debut after he received a wildcard for the first edition of the 2025 Genesis Trading Cup in Sofia, but lost in the opening round to the eventual champion Zdeněk Kolář. A week later Vasilev played in the second edition of the tournament as well, where he scored his debut win at this level defeating the No. 4 seed Ivan Gakhov with 6–3 6–3. In the second round he lost to former No. 38 Alex Molčan.

== ITF World Tennis Tour finals ==
=== Singles: 2 (1 title, 1 runner-up) ===
Legend ATP Challenger Tour (0–0) ITF World Tennis Tour (1–1)	Titles by surface Hard (0–0) Clay (1–1) Carpet (0–0)

Result	W–L	Date	Tournament	Tier	Surface	Opponent	Score
Loss	0–1	Aug 2025	M15 Sofia, Bulgaria	World Tennis Tour	Clay	(France) Thomas Faurel	5–7, 0–6
Win	1–1	May 2026	M25 Kuršumlijska Banja, Serbia	World Tennis Tour	Clay	Denis Klok	6–2, 4–6, 6–2

=== Doubles: 1 (1 runner-up) ===
Legend (doubles) ATP Challenger Tour (0–0) ITF World Tennis Tour (0–1)	Titles by surface Hard (0–0) Clay (0–1) Carpet (0–0)

Result	W–L	Date	Tournament	Tier	Surface	Partner	Opponents	Score
Loss	0–1	May 2026	M25 Kuršumlijska Banja, Serbia	World Tennis Tour	Clay	(Serbia) Stefan Popović	Anton Arzhankin (Canada) Benjamin Thomas George	1–6, 5–7

== National representation ==
=== Davis Cup: 3 (2 victories, 1 defeat) ===
Vasilev debuted for the Bulgaria Davis Cup team in 2025. Since then he has 2 nominations with 2 ties played; his singles W/L record is 2–1 and doubles W/L record is 0–0 (2–1 overall).

Group membership Finals (–) Qualifying round (0–1) Group I (2–0) Group II (–) Group III (–) Group IV (–)	Matches by surface Hard (–) Clay (2–1) Grass (–)	Matches by type Singles (2–1) Doubles (–)

- ▲ ▼ indicates the result of the Davis Cup match followed by the score, date, place of event, the zonal classification and its phase, and the court surface.

Rubber result	No.	Rubber	Match type (partner if any)	Opponent nation	Opponent player(s)	Score
▲3–2; 13–14 September 2025; Tennis Club Lokomotiv, Plovdiv, Bulgaria; World Group I; Clay surface
Win	1	I	Singles	Finland	Otto Virtanen	6–3, 7–5
Win	2	V	Singles	Finland	Emil Ruusuvuori	7–6^{(7–5)}, 6–4
▼0–4; 7–8 February 2026; Kolodruma, Plovdiv, Bulgaria; Qualifiers first round; Clay (i) surface
Loss	3	I	Singles	Belgium	Raphaël Collignon	3–6, 3–6

== Junior Grand Slam finals ==
=== Singles: 1 (runner-up) ===
Result	Year	Tournament	Surface	Opponent	Score
Loss	2025	US Open	Hard	(Bulgaria) Ivan Ivanov	5–7, 3–6
