= Christoph Negritu =

German tennis player (born 1994)

Christoph Negritu Mio
- Country (sports): Germany
- Born: 21 March 1994 (age 32) Dinkelsbühl, Germany
- Height: 1.93 m (6 ft 4 in)
- Plays: Right-handed (two-handed backhand)
- Prize money: US $226,872

Singles
- Career record: 0–0
- Career titles: 4 ITF
- Highest ranking: No. 263 (4 August 2025)
- Current ranking: No. 359 (9 February 2026)

Doubles
- Career record: 0–0
- Career titles: 7 Challenger, 26 ITF
- Highest ranking: No. 105 (18 August 2025)
- Current ranking: No. 119 (9 February 2026)
- Last updated on: 9 February 2026.

Christoph Negritu Mio (born 21 March 1994) is a German tennis player. He has a career high ATP singles ranking of world No. 263, achieved on 4 August 2025, and a best doubles ranking of No. 105, attained on 18 August 2025.

== Career ==
In August 2024, Negritu won his maiden ATP Challenger Tour doubles title at the 2024 Dobrich Challenger with Alexander Merino.

In December 2024, Negritu made his first singles final at the 2024 Yokkaichi Challenger and reached the top 400 in the rankings on 2 December 2024.

== ATP Challenger finals ==
=== Singles: 1 (1 runner-up) ===
Finals by surface
Hard (0–1)
Clay (0–0)

Result	W–L	Date	Tournament	Surface	Opponent	Score
Loss	0–1	Dec 2024	Yokkaichi, Japan	Hard	(Japan) Rei Sakamoto	6–1, 3–6, 4–6

=== Doubles: 9 (7 titles, 2 runner-ups) ===
Finals by surface
Hard (2–0)
Clay (5–2)

Result	W–L	Date	Tournament	Surface	Partner	Opponents	Score
Win	1–0	Aug 2024	Dobrich, Bulgaria	Clay	(Peru) Alexander Merino	(Romania) Victor Vlad Cornea (Turkey) Ergi Kırkın	6–4, 6–2
Win	2–0	Sep 2024	Sibiu, Romania	Clay	(Peru) Alexander Merino	(Canada) Liam Draxl (Canada) Cleeve Harper	6–2, 7–6^{(7–2)}
Win	3–0	Oct 2024	Valencia, Spain	Clay	(Peru) Alexander Merino	(Poland) Karol Drzewiecki (Poland) Piotr Matuszewski	6–3, 6–4
Win	4–0	Feb 2025	Tenerife, Spain	Hard	(Peru) Alexander Merino	(Israel) Daniel Cukierman (United Kingdom) Joshua Paris	2–6, 6–3, [10–8]
Win	5–0	Apr 2025	Barletta, Italy	Clay	(Peru) Alexander Merino	(Netherlands) Mats Hermans (Portugal) Tiago Pereira	7–6^{(7–5)}, 6–2
Loss	5–1	Jul 2025	Braunschweig, Germany	Clay	(Peru) Alexander Merino	(United States) Vasil Kirkov (Netherlands) Bart Stevens	2–6, 3–6
Win	6–1	Jul 2025	Tampere, Finland	Clay	(Ukraine) Vladyslav Orlov	(Netherlands) Mats Hermans (Netherlands) Mick Veldheer	7–5, 6–1
Loss	6–2	Nov 2025	Florianópolis, Brazil	Clay	(Peru) Alexander Merino	(Bolivia) Boris Arias (Denmark) Johannes Ingildsen	6–3, 3–6, [8–10]
Win	7–2	Jan 2026	Glasgow, United Kingdom	Hard (i)	(Colombia) Adrià Soriano Barrera	(United Kingdom) Charles Broom (United Kingdom) Ben Jones	2–6, 6–2, [10–4]
