= Dobrich Challenger =

Izida/Genesis Cup
- 2025 Izida Cup

ATP Challenger Tour
- Event name: Genesis Trading Cup (2025), Izida Cup (2024)
- Location: Sofia (2025), Dobrich (2024), Bulgaria
- Venue: National Tennis Center Borisova Gradina Park (2025); Tennis Club Izida (2024)
- Category: ATP Challenger Tour
- Surface: Clay
- Prize money: €91,250 (2025), €36,900 (2024)

The Genesis Cup (formerly the Izida Cup) is a professional tennis tournament played on clay courts. It is currently part of the ATP Challenger Tour. It was first held in Dobrich, Bulgaria in 2024 in two separate editions, before it moved to the capital Sofia in 2025.

== Past finals ==
=== Singles ===
Year	Champion	Runner-up	Score
2025 (2)	(Slovakia) Alex Molčan	(Austria) Joel Schwärzler	7–5, 6–4
2025 (1)	(Czech Republic) Zdeněk Kolář	(Bolivia) Murkel Dellien	6–2, 6–2
2024 (2)	(Netherlands) Guy den Ouden	(Netherlands) Jelle Sels	6–2, 6–3
2024 (1)	(Argentina) Juan Bautista Torres	Ivan Gakhov	5–7, 6–0, 7–5

=== Doubles ===
Year	Champions	Runners-up	Score
2025 (2)	(Austria) David Pichler (Croatia) Nino Serdarušić	(Romania) Alexandru Jecan (Romania) Bogdan Pavel	4–6, 7–6^{(7–2)}, [10–7]
2025 (1)	(Serbia) Stefan Latinović; Marat Sharipov	(Slovakia) Miloš Karol (Finland) Patrik Niklas-Salminen	6–3, 2–6, [13–11]
2024 (2)	(Canada) Liam Draxl (Canada) Cleeve Harper	(Italy) Francesco Maestrelli (Italy) Filippo Romano	6–1, 3–6, [12–10]
2024 (1)	(Peru) Alexander Merino (Germany) Christoph Negritu	(Romania) Victor Vlad Cornea (Turkey) Ergi Kırkın	6–4, 6–2
