= Alexander Donski =

Bulgarian tennis player (born 1998)

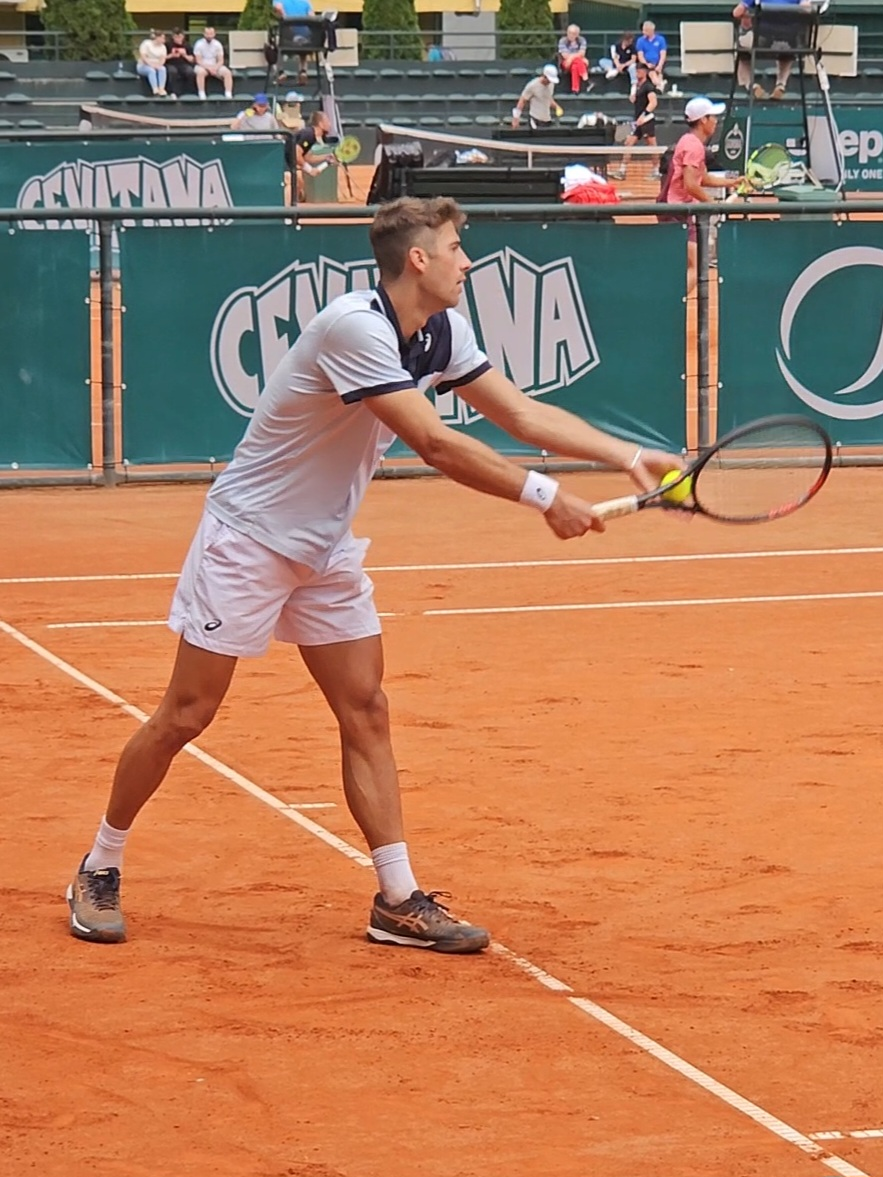
- Donski at the 2024 Macedonian Open
- Country (sports): Bulgaria
- Born: 1 August 1998 (age 28) Philadelphia, PA, United States
- Height: 1.88 m (6 ft 2 in)
- Turned pro: 2017
- Plays: Right-handed (two-handed backhand)
- Coach: Mike Donski
- Prize money: US $263,144

Singles
- Career record: 1–1 (at ATP Tour level, Grand Slam level, and in Davis Cup)
- Career titles: 0 Challengers, 3 Futures
- Highest ranking: No. 502 (10 August 2026)
- Current ranking: No. 515 (26 October 2026)

Doubles
- Career record: 9–13 (at ATP Tour level, Grand Slam level, and in Davis Cup)
- Career titles: 5 Challengers, 20 Futures
- Highest ranking: No. 78 (26 October 2026)
- Current ranking: No. 82 (16 November 2026)

Grand Slam doubles results
- US Open: 2R (2026)
- Last updated on: 18 November 2026.

Alexander Donski (Bulgarian: Александър Донски; born 1 August 1998) is a Bulgarian professional tennis player. Donski holds the second highest-ever ATP doubles ranking by a Bulgarian, achieving a career-high of world No. 78 on 26 October 2026, only Grigor Dimitrov has achieved a higher ranking for a Bulgarian player, reaching No. 66 in doubles. He has a singles ranking of No. 502, achieved on 10 August 2026.

Donski competes on the ATP Challenger Tour where in doubles, he has won five titles. He has also won 20 ITF doubles titles. Donski is an active member of the Bulgarian Davis Cup Team and is regularly playing in doubles rubbers.

== ITF Junior Career ==
Donski reached a career-high ITF junior ranking of No. 92 on 24 October 2016.

The highlights of his activity in singles on the ITF Junior Tour include the following:

- Reaching the final round of qualifying at the 2016 Junior US Open (3-6, 6-3, 3-6 vs Patrick Kypson)
- Two finals at Grade 2 events in Bulgaria and the Netherlands (5-7, 3-6 vs Sebastian Baez) respectively
- One Grade 5 title in Bulgaria

In doubles he won three titles including a Grade 1 event in Morocco, a Grade 4 event in the United States, a Grade 5 event in the Bahamas, and made one further final at a Grade 4 event in Greece.

Overall, in international junior competition, Donski compiled a cumulative win/loss record of 68-47 in singles and 33-40 in doubles.

== Professional career ==
Donski officially turned pro in 2017, however, as early as 2014, he played a limited number of Futures tournaments on the ITF Pro Circuit to gain experience alongside his main activity on the ITF Junior Tour. As an amateur, he qualified twice for the main draw of a Futures tournament, once in the Dominican Republic in late 2015 and a second time in Greece a year later.

=== 2017: First ATP Points ===
In 2017, Donski acquired his first two ATP singles points that elevated him to the year-end ranking of No. 1575. Both points came in the summer at two $15K events held in Istanbul, for which he successfully qualified. As a qualifier in the main draw, he defeated a Turkish lucky loser to win the first ATP point, and then in the next event defeated a fellow qualifier, also from Turkiye, to win the second. Donski positioned himself to play for ATP points on 6 other occasions that same year, however he was unable to secure further points.

Some of the more notable opposition he faced in 2017 who barred him from acquiring additional ATP points included Hubert Hurkacz, Botic van de Zandschulp, and Tallon Griekspoor.

=== 2018: ATP 250 Wildcard, Uphill Battles ===
Donski made his ATP main draw debut at the 2018 Diema Xtra Sofia Open, receiving a wildcard into both the singles and doubles tournament after winning the Bulgarian Men's Indoor National Championships, defeating the then Bulgarian singles No.3, Aleksandar Lazov (ATP No. 400) 3–6, 6–3, 6–4 in the final. Donski was defeated in straight sets by Martin Klizan in the first round of the singles draw before also falling in the first round of the doubles draw.

In 2018, Donski only saw limited progress on the singles front. Despite competing in the main draw of Futures events another 6 times, he accumulated only 3 ATP points that year. He was unable to advance further than the second round of the main draw of any given singles event. In doubles, he fared better and reached his first final partnering Vasil Kirkov in Sozopol and made two other semifinal runs. He finished the year ranked No. 1431 in singles and No.1061 in doubles.

=== 2019: First Futures Titles in Singles and Doubles ===
In 2019, Donski made significant progress on the ITF Men's World Tennis Tour in both singles and doubles. In singles, he captured his first Futures title in October at an M15 event in Pretoria, defeating Arthur Cazaux 7-6(3), 6-7(5), 7-6(6) in the final. Prior to that victory, he managed to reach three other finals earlier in the year at the M15 events in Sozopol, Telavi, and Johannesburg.

In doubles, Donski reached five finals and converted on two occasions. He won his first title at an M15 in Telavi and then another in Pretoria later in the year, where he also won his first singles title. These strong showings in both singles and doubles afforded him the year-end ATP rankings of No.585 and No.429 respectively.

=== 2020: Obstacles - Pandemic and ITF Adjustments ===
In 2020, along with many other players, Donski struggled to adapt to the challenges of traveling and competing at professional events under the changing realities and restrictions of the COVID-19 pandemic. He dedicated a video on Operation Liftoff, his YouTube Channel, to describing his experience of the disruptions that emerged.

In singles, out of a truncated schedule of just 10 events that year, including a Davis Cup match in Costa Rica, Donski won only 3 matches in total and never managed to pass the second round at any event. The most competitive singles match he played that year came in November at the second round of an M15 event in Antalya, where he clashed with recent ITF Junior No.1, Holger Rune. Rune defeated Donski 5–7, 6–3, 6–3.

In doubles, Donski also found little success, making just a single semifinal appearance in October at an M15 event in Sharm El Sheikh.

Despite these setbacks, his year-end ATP ranking for singles did not change substantially (ended No.596), as two temporary special provisions across the tour were in place at the time. One was a freeze of ATP points won in 2019 to account for disruptions in the regular event calendar by the pandemic, while the other was related to ongoing experimental structural changes in the ranking system by the ITF. Donski's year-end doubles ranking, however, did drop by more than 240 spots to No.671 because of the timing of the acquisition of previous points.

=== 2021: Rebuilding Momentum ===
Donski did not win any singles titles in 2021, however he did regain some of the form lost in the uncertainty of the previous year. He reached at least the quarterfinals of four separate events and advanced to the semifinals of two of those events (both in the M15 category), one in Monastir and the other in Sozopol.

In late September 2021, Donski scored his first singles win at the ATP level at the 2021 Sofia Open, where he received another wild card for the singles qualifying draw. He pulled an upset win over eighth seed Jurij Rodionov 2–6, 6–1, 7-6(4) before losing in the final round to the Italian veteran, Andreas Seppi. He also played in the doubles competition at his home ATP tournament with Dimitar Kuzmanov, but the Bulgarian duo lost in a third set tiebreaker to eventual champions Jonny O'Mara and Ken Skupski. Cumulatively, however, these results could not prevent his singles ranking from dipping to ATP No. 659 by end of the year.

The Bulgarian fared better on the doubles scene and resumed building up his ranking during the 2021 season. Donski seized three more ITF titles, securing a victory at the M15 event in Sozopol with Billy Harris and following it up with triumphs at the M25 events in Saint-Dizier and Villers-lès-Nancy with Petros Tsitsipas. He also made it to the final of an M25 event in Říčany partnering Colin Sinclair, but the pair came up short. Donski finished the year ranked No. 505 in doubles.

=== 2022: Second ITF Singles Title, Strong Season in Doubles ===
In late January 2022, Donski ended a two-year stretch of failing to reach the final of an ITF singles event, by winning four consecutive matches in the main draw of an M15 event in Monastir. He was only defeated in the championship round in three sets 0–6, 6–3, 5-7 by Laurent Lokoli of France. One month and a half later, however, Donski would return to Monastir to compete at another M15 event and this time would indeed emerge victorious, picking up only his second ever ITF Men's World Tennis Tour singles title. He defeated another Frenchman, Terence Atmane, in the final round 6–2, 5–7, 6–3.

Despite Donski's surging form in singles in the beginning of the year, this momentum would not carry through the spring or the summer. It was not until October 2022 when he would once again string together multiple consecutive matches. He reached a further three semifinals in the M15 category (twice in Sozopol and once in Monastir) before the year's end. Ultimately, 2022 was actually a rather stagnant year in terms of singles rankings progress for Donski. His results only allowed him to improve his ranking to ATP No.628, only 31 spots higher than the year before.

In contrast to his performance in singles, Donski continued to push the front in doubles and reached new heights. In 2022, Donski reached six finals and, of those finals, captured four titles (three M15 events, one M25). Interestingly enough, Donski accomplished this with six different partners (Théo Arribagé, Zvonimir Babić, David Pichler, Karl Friberg, Vladyslav Orlov, and Tim Sandkaulen) reinforcing his claim as a highly adaptable player in the game of doubles.

This versatility also manifested itself in a strong 6–3, 7-6(6) victory over the South African team of Raven Klaasen (former ATP no.7 in doubles) and Lleyton Cronje Davis Cup competition in September back in Bulgaria. In addition, Donski made good use of another wildcard at the ATP 250 event in Sofia by defeating the team of Fabrice Martin and Aisam Qureshi (a former top 10 doubles player) 4–6, 6–3, 10-8 alongside his countryman, Alexandar Lazarov. Donski and Lazarov were defeated in the next round by the top seeded team of Simone Bolelli and Fabio Fognini.

This success catapulted him to a then career-high ATP doubles ranking of No.248, which he achieved in October 2022. His final year-end ranking, however, was slightly lower at No.259.

=== 2023: Doubles Takes Priority ===
Donski maintained solid form in doubles from the previous season. He won three M15 titles with three different partners, all on hard courts in Monastir.

He also made four other finals at M15 events (Antalya, Štore, Celje, Monastir), and regularly penetrated as deep as the semifinals of many of the other tournaments that he played in.

The 2023 season, however, was not a successful one in singles for Donski. Out of a mix of 23 tournaments, including 3 ATP Challenger events and another wildcard at the ATP 250 event in Sofia, he only made it to the semifinals of one Futures event, an M15 event in Monastir in late October. Most of his other defeats came either in qualifying rounds or the early rounds of main draws.

Donski ended the year ranked ATP No. 935 in singles and No. 315 in doubles.

=== 2024: Career-High Doubles Ranking, ATP Challenger Tour Inroads ===
In 2024, Donski accelerated his trajectory as a doubles specialist on the ATP tour and vastly outdid any of his performances in previous years by capturing seven ITF titles across tournaments held in Portugal, Tunisia, South Africa, and Spain. Four of Donski's wins came in the M25 category, while the other three came in the M15 category. He also started making inroads at the Challenger level, reaching the semifinal round of a $100K event in Luedenscheid, as well as a final and a semifinal at $50K events in Segovia and Dobrich, respectively. At the Dobrich 1 Challenger 50, Donski entered the doubles event as the number one seed alongside his Brazilian partner, Luis Britto.

Of the nine doubles finals that Donski reached in 2024, six of them (four M25s, an M15, and the Challenger 50) came in partnership with the Portuguese player, Tiago Pereira. This success propelled Donski to a career-high ATP doubles ranking of No. 217 on the 26 August 2025.

In singles, despite obstacles posed by his lower ranking earlier in the year, Donski found some surprising success at three consecutive ATP Challenger 50 events that took place over the summer. In both Open de Pozoblanco and Dobrich Challenger, Donski passed the qualifying draw and made it to the second round of the main draw. In Pozoblanco, he handily defeated Ulises Blanch in the first round 6–3, 6-1 before narrowly falling to second seed and former top 100 player, Egor Gerasimov, 6–4, 3–6, 4-6 after having led 3–0 with a double break in the final set. In the third Challenger 50 event that he played (a second tournament in Dobrich), he received a wildcard into the main draw that he made good use of by reaching the quarterfinals.

Donski finished 2024 with a year-end ATP singles ranking of No. 746..

=== 2025-2026: Maiden Challenger title, Top 100 debut in Doubles ===
In 2025, the majority of Donski's schedule on the doubles circuit occurred at Challenger level tournaments, in line with his strong upward trajectory. Throughout the year, he reached seven finals in total and captured three titles, an M15 in Pretoria and two Challenger 100 events, the first in Kigali and the latter in Maia. These strong showings enabled Donski to rise to a career-high ATP doubles ranking of No. 120 (1 December, 2025), making him the second highest ranked Bulgarian ever, trailing only Grigor Dimitrov, who had a career-high ATP doubles of world No. 66.

In February 2025, Donski put together a championship run in singles, at an M15 event in Pretoria, where he also won the doubles event. He dod not drop a set and ultimately defeated the second seed, Cem Ilkel, 7-6(5), 6–4 in the final. However, this early success in 2025 would not carry into the rest of the year. Donski failed to pass the second round of the main draw at any singles event (mostly at the Challenger level) and struggled to transcend qualifying draws.

Donski's 2026 year-end ATP doubles ranking was at No. 82 on 16 November 2026.

== Year-end ATP Ranking ==
Year	2017	2018	2019	2020	2021	2022	2023	2024	2025
Singles	1575	1433	568	593	676	605	990	749	731
Doubles	-	1046	436	661	517	251	313	228	132

== ATP Challenger and ITF Tour Finals ==
=== Singles: 8 (3–5) ===
Legend (singles) ATP Challenger Tour (0–1) ITF World Tennis Tour (3–4)	Titles by surface Hard (3–4) Clay (0–1)

Result	W–L	Date	Tournament	Tier	Surface	Opponent	Score
Loss	0–1	May 2019	M15 Sozopol, Bulgaria	World Tennis Tour	Hard	(Turkey) Altuğ Çelikbilek	7–6^{(7–5)}, 3–6, 2–6
Loss	0–2	Aug 2019	M15 Telavi, Georgia	World Tennis Tour	Clay	(Russia) Yan Bondarevskiy	4–6, 0–6
Loss	0–3	Sep 2019	M15 Johannesburg, South Africa	World Tennis Tour	Hard	(Zimbabwe) Benjamin Lock	7–6^{(7–5)}, 3–6, 6–7^{(3–7)}
Win	1–3	Sep 2019	M15 Pretoria, South Africa	World Tennis Tour	Hard	(France) Arthur Cazaux	7–6^{(7–3)}, 6–7^{(5–7)}, 7–6 ^{(8–6)}
Loss	1–4	Feb 2022	M15 Monastir, Tunisia	World Tennis Tour	Hard	(France) Laurent Lokoli	0–6, 6–3, 5–7
Win	2–4	Mar 2022	M15 Monastir, Tunisia	World Tennis Tour	Hard	(France) Térence Atmane	6–2, 5–7, 6–3
Win	3–4	Feb 2025	M15 Pretoria, South Africa	World Tennis Tour	Hard	(Turkey) Cem İlkel	7–6^{(7–5)}, 6–4
Loss	3–5	Jun 2026	Centurion, South Africa	Challenger	Hard	(South Africa) Philip Henning	2–6, 6–3, 6–7^{(6–8)}

=== Doubles: 47 (25–22) ===
Legend (doubles) ATP Challenger Tour (5–8) ITF Futures/World Tennis Tour (20–14)	Titles by surface Hard (19–12) Clay (6–10)

Result	W–L	Date	Tournament	Tier	Surface	Partner	Opponents	Score
Loss	0–1	May 2018	Bulgaria F1, Sozopol	Futures	Hard	(United States) Vasil Kirkov	(France) Sébastien Boltz (Brazil) Caio Silva	5–7, 3–6
Loss	0–2	May 2019	M15 Sozopol, Bulgaria	World Tennis Tour	Hard	(Bulgaria) Alexandar Lazarov	(United States) Alec Adamson (United States) Vasil Kirkov	6–4, 2–6, [6–10]
Loss	0–3	Jun 2019	M15 Plovdiv, Bulgaria	World Tennis Tour	Clay	(Bulgaria) Simon Anthony Ivanov	(Russia) Alexander Igoshin (Russia) Evgenii Tiurnev	1–6, 7–6^{(11–9)}, [5–10]
Win	1–3	Jul 2019	M15 Telavi, Georgia	World Tennis Tour	Clay	(United States) Maksim Tikhomirov	(Russia) Yan Bondarevskiy (Georgia (country)) George Tsivadze	6–4, 6–4
Loss	1–4	Sep 2019	M15 Johannesburg, South Africa	World Tennis Tour	Hard	(Austria) David Pichler	(Zimbabwe) Benjamin Lock (Zimbabwe) Courtney John Lock	3–6, 4–6
Win	2–4	Oct 2019	M15 Pretoria, South Africa	World Tennis Tour	Hard	(Canada) Raheel Manji	(Austria) David Pichler (Zimbabwe) Mehluli Sibanda	6–2, 7–5
Loss	2–5	Sep 2021	M25 Říčany, Czech Republic	World Tennis Tour	Clay	(Northern Mariana Islands) Colin Sinclair	(United States) Toby Kodat (Czech Republic) Adam Pavlásek	3–6, 5–7
Win	3–5	Oct 2021	M15 Sozopol, Bulgaria	World Tennis Tour	Hard	(United Kingdom) Billy Harris	(Russia) Yan Bondarevskiy (Germany) Kai Wehnelt	6–1, 6–4
Win	4–5	Nov 2021	M25 Saint-Dizier, France	World Tennis Tour	Hard (i)	(Greece) Petros Tsitsipas	(Australia) Blake Ellis (Australia) Tristan Schoolkate	6–4, 4–6, [10–7]
Win	5–5	Nov 2021	M25 Villers-lès-Nancy, France	World Tennis Tour	Hard (i)	(Greece) Petros Tsitsipas	(Australia) Blake Ellis (Australia) Tristan Schoolkate	7–6^{(7–2)}, 3–2 ret.
Win	6–5	Jan 2022	M25 Monastir, Tunisia	World Tennis Tour	Hard	(France) Théo Arribagé	(France) Dan Added (France) Clément Tabur	6–2, 5–7, [10–7]
Loss	6–6	Jan 2022	M25 Monastir, Tunisia	World Tennis Tour	Hard	(Croatia) Zvonimir Babić	(France) Théo Arribagé (France) Titouan Droguet	6–1, 4–6, [8–10]
Win	7–6	Jun 2022	M15 Sarajevo, Bosnia & Herzegovina	World Tennis Tour	Clay	(Austria) David Pichler	(France) Constantin Bittoun Kouzmine (Czech Republic) Michael Vrbenský	5–7, 7–6^{(7–2)}, [12–10]
Win	8–6	Jun 2022	M15 Alkmaar, Netherlands	World Tennis Tour	Clay	(Sweden) Karl Friberg	(Czech Republic) Patrik Rikl (Czech Republic) Matěj Vocel	3–6, 3–3 ret.
Win	9–6	Oct 2022	M15 Sozopol, Bulgaria	World Tennis Tour	Hard	(Ukraine) Vladyslav Orlov	(Turkey) Tuna Altuna (Poland) Olaf Pieczkowski	6–2, 3–6, [10–5]
Loss	9–7	Nov 2022	M25 Heraklion, Greece	World Tennis Tour	Hard	(Germany) Tim Sandkaulen	(Austria) Sandro Kopp (Austria) Neil Oberleitner	7–6^{(7–2)}, 3–6, [7–10]
Win	10–7	Mar 2023	M15 Monastir, Tunisia	World Tennis Tour	Hard	(Chinese Taipei) Ray Ho	Bogdan Bobrov (Germany) Christoph Negritu	7–5, 6–3
Loss	10–8	May 2023	M15 Antalya, Turkey	World Tennis Tour	Clay	Egor Agafonov	Anton Chekhov; Ivan Nedelko	6–4, 4–6, [8–10]
Loss	10–9	Jun 2023	M15 Štore, Slovenia	World Tennis Tour	Clay	(Czech Republic) Dominik Kellovský	(Czech Republic) Matthew William Donald (Czech Republic) Jakub Nicod	2–6, 2–6
Loss	10–10	Jul 2023	M15 Celje, Slovenia	World Tennis Tour	Clay	(Australia) Zaharije-Zak Talic	(Belgium) Buvaysar Gadamauri (Czech Republic) Jakub Nicod	2–6, 3–6
Loss	10–11	Nov 2023	M15 Monastir, Tunisia	World Tennis Tour	Hard	(Portugal) Tiago Pereira	(Netherlands) Daniel de Jonge (Germany) John Sperle	w/o
Win	11–11	Dec 2023	M15 Monastir, Tunisia	World Tennis Tour	Hard	(Portugal) Tiago Pereira	(Germany) Christoph Negritu (United States) Michael Zhu	6–2, 2–1, ret.
Win	12–11	Dec 2023	M15 Monastir, Tunisia	World Tennis Tour	Hard	(China) Tao Mu	Igor Kudriashov; Aleksandr Lobanov	6–0, 3–6, [12–10]
Win	13–11	Mar 2024	M25 Faro, Portugal	World Tennis Tour	Hard	(Portugal) Tiago Pereira	(Sweden) Simon Freund (Denmark) Johannes Ingildsen	6–4, 3–6, [10–7]
Loss	13–12	Mar 2024	M25 Quinta do Lago, Portugal	World Tennis Tour	Hard	(Portugal) Tiago Pereira	(Brazil) Gabriel Décamps (Finland) Eero Vasa	2–7, 7–6^{(7–3)}, [7–10]
Win	14–12	Mar 2024	M25 Vale do Lobo, Portugal	World Tennis Tour	Hard	(Portugal) Tiago Pereira	(Spain) Alberto Barroso Campos (Spain) Imanol López Morillo	6–4, 4–6, [10–8]
Win	15–12	Mar 2024	M25 Loulé, Portugal	World Tennis Tour	Hard	(Portugal) Tiago Pereira	(France) Dan Added (Czech Republic) Jakub Nicod	7–6^{(8–6)}, 2–6, [10–1]
Win	16–12	Apr 2024	M25 Monastir, Tunisia	World Tennis Tour	Hard	(Portugal) Tiago Pereira	(United States) Jordan Chiu (Sweden) Fred Simonsson	6–4, 6–2
Win	17–12	Jun 2024	M15 Hillcrest, South Africa	World Tennis Tour	Hard	(South Africa) Alec Beckley	(South Africa) Vasilios Caripi (Costa Rica) Jesse Flores	7–6^{(7–5)}, 6–4
Loss	17–13	Jul 2024	Segovia, Spain	Challenger	Hard	(Portugal) Tiago Pereira	(France) Dan Added (France) Arthur Reymond	4–6, 3–6
Win	18–13	Nov 2024	M15 Valencia, Spain	World Tennis Tour	Clay	(Spain) Bruno Pujol Navarro	(Chile) Diego Fernández Flores (Spain) Mario Mansilla Díez	6–4, 6–2
Win	19–13	Nov 2024	M25 Monastir, Tunisia	World Tennis Tour	Hard	(Spain) Bruno Pujol Navarro	(Tunisia) Aziz Ouakaa (Slovakia) Lukáš Pokorný	7–6^{(7–4)}, 4–6, [10–5]
Loss	19–14	Jan 2025	M25 Esch-sur-Alzette, Luxembourg	World Tennis Tour	Hard	(Spain) Bruno Pujol Navarro	(Austria) Sandro Kopp (Czech Republic) Michael Vrbenský	6–3, 6–7^{(2–7)}, [3–10]
Win	20–14	Feb 2025	M15 Pretoria, South Africa	World Tennis Tour	Hard	(Spain) Izan Almazán Valiente	(United States) Tristan Stringer (Australia) Stefan Vujic	6–2, 5–7, [10–7]
Loss	20–15	Mar 2025	M15 Pretoria, South Africa	World Tennis Tour	Hard	(Spain) Izan Almazán Valiente	(Turkey) Tuncay Duran (Turkey) Alp Horoz	w/o
Win	21–15	Mar 2025	Kigali, Rwanda	Challenger	Clay	(India) Siddhant Banthia	(France) Geoffrey Blancaneaux (Czech Republic) Zdeněk Kolář	6–4, 5–7, [10–8]
Loss	21–16	May 2025	Tunis, Tunisia	Challenger	Clay	(India) Siddhant Banthia	(Czech Republic) Hynek Bartoň (Czech Republic) Michael Vrbenský	7–5, 4–6, [7–10]
Loss	21–17	Oct 2025	Braga, Portugal	Challenger	Clay	(Serbia) Stefan Latinović	(Brazil) Marcelo Demoliner (Brazil) Orlando Luz	5–7, 7–5, [7–10]
Win	22–17	Nov 2025	Maia, Portugal	Challenger	Clay (i)	(Portugal) Tiago Pereira	(France) Théo Arribagé (Croatia) Nino Serdarušić	6–2, 7–6^{(8–6)}
Win	23–17	Feb 2026	New Delhi, India	Challenger	Hard	(India) Siddhant Banthia	(Thailand) Pruchya Isaro (India) Niki Kaliyanda Poonacha	4–6, 6–4, [12–10]
Loss	23–18	Mar 2026	Kigali, Rwanda	Challenger	Clay	(India) Siddhant Banthia	(United Kingdom) Jay Clarke (Netherlands) Max Houkes	4–6, 7–6^{(8–6)}, [10–12]
Loss	23–19	Mar 2026	Kigali, Rwanda	Challenger	Clay	(India) Siddhant Banthia	(Serbia) Stefan Latinović (France) Luka Pavlovic	6–7^{(5–7)}, 6–7^{(2–7)}
Loss	23–20	Apr 2026	Menorca, Spain	Challenger	Clay	(India) Siddhant Banthia	(Thailand) Pruchya Isaro (India) Niki Kaliyanda Poonacha	3–6, 6–7^{(3–7)}
Win	24–20	May 2026	Oeiras, Portugal	Challenger	Clay	(India) Siddhant Banthia	(Portugal) Tiago Pereira (Spain) David Vega Hernández	6–3, 6–2
Win	25–20	Aug 2026	Quebec City, Canada	Challenger	Hard	(New Zealand) Ajeet Rai	(Canada) Justin Boulais (Canada) Duncan Chan	6–3, 4–6, [10–3]
Loss	25–21	Aug 2026	Kingston, Jamaica	Challenger	Hard	(Canada) Dan Martin	(France) Arthur Reymond (France) Luca Sanchez	2–6, 4–6
Loss	25–22	Sep 2026	Porto, Portugal	Challenger	Hard	(Poland) Filip Pieczonka	(Serbia) Stefan Latinović (Croatia) Mili Poljičak	3–6, 4–6

== Davis Cup Participation ==
Donski has been an active member of the Bulgarian Davis Cup Team since 2019. As the highest ranked Bulgarian man in the ATP doubles rankings since November 2021, he has regularly been deployed in the team's doubles rubbers. Some of his most notable wins came partnering Alexandar Lazarov against South Africa's Raven Klaasen / Lleyton Cronje (6–3, 7–6) in 2022 and against the Kazakh team of Alexander Bublik / Aleksandr Nedovyesov (6–3, 6–3) in 2023.

In 2025, Donski alongside his partner, Pyotr Nesterov, proved instrumental in securing critical victories against Romania and Finland to propel the Bulgarian Davis Cup team to the qualifying phase of the Davis Cup Finals for the very first time in the team's history. Against Finland, in September, Donski and Nesterov defeated the powerful duo of Otto Virtanen and Harri Heliovaara (ranked ATP doubles No.7 at the time) 6–4, 1–6, 7-6(1).

As of February 2026, Donski has been nominated to the Bulgarian Davis Cup Team 12 times and holds a cumulative record of 6 wins and 5 losses (5–5 in doubles, 1–0 in singles).

Group membership Finals (0–0) Qualifying round (0–1) Group I (3–2) Group II (3–2) Group III (0–0) Group IV (0–0)	Matches by surface Hard (3–3) Clay (3–2) Grass (0–0) Carpet (0–0)	Matches by type Singles (1–0) Doubles (5–5)

- ▲ ▼ indicates the result of the Davis Cup match followed by the score, date, place of event, the zonal classification and its phase, and the court surface.

Rubber result	No.	Rubber	Match type (partner if any)	Opponent nation	Opponent player(s)	Score
▼1–4; 13–14 September 2019; Kelvin Grove Club, Cape Town, South Africa; Group II Europe/Africa First Round; Hard surface
Defeat	1	I	Doubles (with Alexandar Lazarov)	South Africa	Raven Klaasen / Ruan Roelofse	3–6, 2–6
▲4–1; 6–7 March 2020; Costa Rica Country Club, San José, Costa Rica; World Group II Play-Off; Hard surface
Victory	2	V	Singles	Costa Rica	Rodrigo Crespo Piedra	6–2, 6–4
▲3–1; 4–5 March 2022; Sport Hall Sofia, Sofia, Bulgaria; World Group II Play-Off; Hard (i) surface
Victory	3	III	Doubles (with Alexandar Lazarov)	Paraguay	Juan Borba / Hernando José Escurra Isnardi	6–3, 7–5
▲3–0; 16–18 September 2022; Bulgarian National Tennis Center, Sofia, Bulgaria; World Group II; Clay surface
Victory	4	III	Doubles (with Alexandar Lazarov)	South Africa	Lleyton Cronje / Raven Klaasen	6–3, 7–6^{(8–6)}
▲3–1; 4–5 February 2023; Wilding Park, Christchurch, New Zealand; World Group I Play-Off; Hard surface
Defeat	5	III	Doubles (with Petr Nesterov)	New Zealand	Artem Sitak / Michael Venus	4–6, 6–3, 3–6
▼1–3; 16–17 September 2023; Bulgarian National Tennis Center, Sofia, Bulgaria; World Group I; Clay surface
Victory	6	III	Doubles (with Alexandar Lazarov)	Kazakhstan	Alexander Bublik / Aleksandr Nedovyesov	6–3, 6–3
▼1–3; 3–4 February 2024; Tennis Center Avenue, Burgas, Bulgaria; World Group I Play-Off; Hard (i) surface
Defeat	7	III	Doubles (with Alexandar Lazarov)	Bosnia and Herzegovina	Mirza Bašić / Damir Džumhur	6–7^{(10–12)}, 3–6
▲3–2; 14–16 September 2024; Tennis Club Lokomotiv, Plovdiv, Bulgaria; World Group II; Clay surface
Defeat	8	III	Doubles (with Petr Nesterov)	El Salvador	Marcelo Arévalo / César Cruz	7–5, 6–7^{(4–7)}, 3–6
▲3–1; 31 January–1 February 2025; Polyvalent Hall, Craiova, Romania; World Group I Play-Off; Hard (i) surface
Victory	9	III	Doubles (with Petr Nesterov)	Romania	Gabi Adrian Boitan / Victor Vlad Cornea	6–3, 6–3
▲3–2; 13–14 September 2025; Tennis Club Lokomotiv, Plovdiv, Bulgaria; World Group I; Clay surface
Victory	10	III	Doubles (with Petr Nesterov)	Finland	Harri Heliövaara / Otto Virtanen	6–4, 1–6, 7–6^{(7–1)}
▼0–4; 7–8 February 2026; Kolodruma, Plovdiv, Bulgaria; Qualifiers first round; Clay (i) surface
Defeat	11	III	Doubles (with Petr Nesterov)	Belgium	Sander Gillé / Joran Vliegen	6–7^{(5–7)}, 6–7^{(3–7)}
