= 2025 Open Comunidad de Madrid – Doubles =

Doubles
- 2025 Open Comunidad de Madrid

Final
- Champions: (Portugal) Francisco Cabral (Austria) Lucas Miedler
- Runners-up: (Switzerland) Jakub Paul (Netherlands) David Pel
- Score: 7–6^{(7–2)}, 6–4

Events
Singles	Doubles
- Open Comunidad de Madrid

Harri Heliövaara and Henry Patten were the defending champions but chose not to defend their title.

Francisco Cabral and Lucas Miedler won the title after defeating Jakub Paul and David Pel 7–6^{(7–2)}, 6–4 in the final.

== Seeds ==
1. (Argentina) Guido Andreozzi / (France) Théo Arribagé (first round)
2. (Brazil) Orlando Luz / (France) Albano Olivetti (semifinals)
3. (Portugal) Francisco Cabral / (Austria) Lucas Miedler (champions)
4. (Switzerland) Jakub Paul / (Netherlands) David Pel (final)

== Draw ==
Key

- Q = Qualifier
- WC = Wild card
- LL = Lucky loser
- Alt = Alternate
- ITF = ITF entry
- PR = Protected ranking
- SR = Special ranking
- SE = Special exempt
- JE = Junior exempt
- JR = Junior Accelerator Programme entrant
- CO = College Accelerator Programme entrant
- NG = Next Gen Accelerator Program entrant
- w/o = Walkover
- r = Retired
- d = Defaulted

=== Draw ===
First round
1	(Argentina) G Andreozzi (France) T Arribagé	6	5	[8]
(India) A Chandrasekar (Spain) D Vega Hernández	3	7	[10]
(Spain) Í Cervantes (Ukraine) D Molchanov	6	3	[12]
(Germany) D Masur (France) L Sanchez	1	6	[10]
4	(Switzerland) J Paul (Netherlands) D Pel	6	7^{7}
WC	(Spain) Pablo Masjuan Ginel (Spain) Sergi Pérez Contri	2	6^{3}
(Spain) A Moro Cañas (Argentina) M Trungelliti	3	2
(Spain) D Rincón (Spain) O Roca Batalla	6	6
(India) S Myneni (India) R Ramanathan	6	5	[10]
(Czech Republic) Jiří Barnat (Czech Republic) F Duda	2	7	[6]
(Poland) K Majchrzak (Austria) S Ofner
3	(Portugal) F Cabral (Austria) L Miedler	w/o
(India) N Kaliyanda Poonacha (Spain) S Martos Gornés	4	4
(India) S Banthia (Bulgaria) A Donski	6	6
Alt	(Netherlands) Michiel de Krom (Netherlands) Ryan Nijboer	6^{2}	4
2	(Brazil) O Luz (France) A Olivetti	7^{7}	6

Quarterfinals
(India) A Chandrasekar (Spain) D Vega Hernández	4	2
(Spain) Í Cervantes (Ukraine) D Molchanov	6	6
4	(Switzerland) J Paul (Netherlands) D Pel	w/o
(Spain) D Rincón (Spain) O Roca Batalla
(India) S Myneni (India) R Ramanathan	2	4
3	(Portugal) F Cabral (Austria) L Miedler	6	6
(India) S Banthia (Bulgaria) A Donski	6^{2}	6^{4}
2	(Brazil) O Luz (France) A Olivetti	7^{7}	7^{7}

Semifinals
(Spain) Í Cervantes (Ukraine) D Molchanov	7^{7}	4	[6]
4	(Switzerland) J Paul (Netherlands) D Pel	6^{4}	6	[10]
3	(Portugal) F Cabral (Austria) L Miedler	6	3	[10]
2	(Brazil) O Luz (France) A Olivetti	4	6	[7]

Final
4	(Switzerland) J Paul (Netherlands) D Pel	6^{2}	4
3	(Portugal) F Cabral (Austria) L Miedler	7^{7}	6
