= 2026 Open Comunidad de Madrid – Singles =

Singles
- 2026 Open Comunidad de Madrid

Final
- Champion: (Hungary) Zsombor Piros
- Runner-up: (Austria) Jurij Rodionov
- Score: 7–5, 6–2

Events
Singles	Doubles
- Open Comunidad de Madrid

Kamil Majchrzak was the defending champion but chose not to defend his title.

Zsombor Piros won the title after defeating Jurij Rodionov 7–5, 6–2 in the final.

== Seeds ==
1. (Spain) Daniel Mérida (withdrew)
2. (France) Arthur Géa (first round)
3. (Luxembourg) Chris Rodesch (first round)
4. (Spain) Pablo Llamas Ruiz (second round)
5. (Hungary) Zsombor Piros (champion)
6. (Chile) Nicolás Jarry (semifinals)
7. (France) Ugo Blanchet (first round)
8. (United Kingdom) Toby Samuel (semifinals)

== Draw ==
Key

- Q = Qualifier
- WC = Wild card
- LL = Lucky loser
- Alt = Alternate
- ITF = ITF entry
- PR = Protected ranking
- SR = Special ranking
- SE = Special exempt
- JE = Junior exempt
- JR = Junior Accelerator Programme entrant
- CO = College Accelerator Programme entrant
- NG = Next Gen Accelerator Program entrant
- w/o = Walkover
- r = Retired
- d = Defaulted

=== Finals ===
Semifinals
8	(United Kingdom) Toby Samuel	6	3	3
5	(Hungary) Zsombor Piros	4	6	6
6	(Chile) Nicolás Jarry	7^{8}	6^{4}	6^{4}
(Austria) Jurij Rodionov	6^{6}	7^{7}	7^{7}

Final
5	(Hungary) Zsombor Piros	7	6
(Austria) Jurij Rodionov	5	2

=== Top half ===
First round
Q	(Lithuania) E Butvilas	6^{5}	6	3
(Austria) J Schwärzler	7^{7}	3	6
R Safiullin	6	7
Q	(Germany) D Dedura	4	5
(Czech Republic) Z Kolář	5	6^{2}
(Greece) S Sakellaridis	7	7^{7}
WC	(Spain) D Rincón	7^{7}	4	1
8	(United Kingdom) T Samuel	6^{3}	6	6
4	(Spain) P Llamas Ruiz	6	4	7
(Portugal) F Ferreira Silva	4	6	5
JR	(Switzerland) H Bernet	4	1
Alt	(Spain) A Moro Cañas	6	6
LL	(France) C Hemery	6	7^{7}
SE	(Spain) Àlex Martínez	2	6^{3}
LL	(Jordan) A Shelbayh	1	6	1
5	(Hungary) Z Piros	6	2	6

Second round
(Austria) J Schwärzler	6	6
R Safiullin	3	4
(Greece) S Sakellaridis	2	6	6^{2}
8	(United Kingdom) T Samuel	6	3	7^{7}
4	(Spain) P Llamas Ruiz	4	6^{5}
Alt	(Spain) A Moro Cañas	6	7^{7}
LL	(France) C Hemery	0	2
5	(Hungary) Z Piros	6	6

Quarterfinals
(Austria) J Schwärzler	6^{7}	6^{2}
8	(United Kingdom) T Samuel	7^{9}	7^{7}
Alt	(Spain) A Moro Cañas	6	3	4
5	(Hungary) Z Piros	4	6	6

Semifinals
8	(United Kingdom) T Samuel	6	3	3
5	(Hungary) Z Piros	4	6	6

=== Bottom half ===
First round
6	(Chile) N Jarry	6	0
WC	(Spain) M Damas	1	0^{r}
Q	(Switzerland) D Stricker	6	6^{1}	6
Q	(Bosnia and Herzegovina) A Nedić	3	7^{7}	2
(Bosnia and Herzegovina) N Fatić	6^{4}	7^{8}	6
Alt	(Spain) P Martín Tiffon	7^{7}	6^{6}	1
Q	(Italy) F Agamenone	5	6	6
3	(Luxembourg) C Rodesch	7	2	1
7	(France) U Blanchet	1	4
Q	(Spain) O Roca Batalla	6	6
JR	(Bulgaria) I Ivanov	5	2
Alt	(Spain) N Sánchez Izquierdo	7	6
(Italy) F Cinà	4	3
(Austria) J Rodionov	6	6
WC	(Spain) Sergi Pérez Contri	6	3	6
2	(France) A Géa	2	6	1

Second round
6	(Chile) N Jarry	6	7^{7}
Q	(Switzerland) D Stricker	2	6^{5}
(Bosnia and Herzegovina) N Fatić	6	4	7^{7}
Q	(Italy) F Agamenone	3	6	6^{1}
Q	(Spain) O Roca Batalla	4	4
Alt	(Spain) N Sánchez Izquierdo	6	6
(Austria) J Rodionov	7^{7}	6^{5}	6
WC	(Spain) S Pérez Contri	6^{5}	7^{7}	3

Quarterfinals
6	(Chile) N Jarry	6	6
(Bosnia and Herzegovina) N Fatić	1	4
Alt	(Spain) N Sánchez Izquierdo	3	4
(Austria) J Rodionov	6	6

Semifinals
6	(Chile) N Jarry	7^{8}	6^{4}	6^{4}
(Austria) J Rodionov	6^{6}	7^{7}	7^{7}
