= 2025 Open Comunidad de Madrid – Singles =

Singles
- 2025 Open Comunidad de Madrid

Final
- Champion: (Poland) Kamil Majchrzak
- Runner-up: (Croatia) Marin Čilić
- Score: 6–3, 4–6, 6–4

Events
Singles	Doubles
- Open Comunidad de Madrid

Stefano Napolitano was the defending champion but chose not to defend his title.

Kamil Majchrzak won the title after defeating Marin Čilić 6–3, 4–6, 6–4 in the final.

== Seeds ==
1. (Croatia) Borna Ćorić (second round)
2. (Bolivia) Hugo Dellien (first round)
3. (United Kingdom) Billy Harris (first round)
4. (Kazakhstan) Alexander Shevchenko (second round)
5. Pavel Kotov (quarterfinals)
6. (Spain) Pablo Carreño Busta (quarterfinals)
7. (France) Valentin Royer (semifinals)
8. (Croatia) Marin Čilić (final)

== Draw ==
Key

- Q = Qualifier
- WC = Wild card
- LL = Lucky loser
- Alt = Alternate
- ITF = ITF entry
- PR = Protected ranking
- SR = Special ranking
- SE = Special exempt
- JE = Junior exempt
- JR = Junior Accelerator Programme entrant
- CO = College Accelerator Programme entrant
- NG = Next Gen Accelerator Program entrant
- w/o = Walkover
- r = Retired
- d = Defaulted

=== Finals ===
Semifinals
7	(France) Valentin Royer	6	5	6^{7}
8	(Croatia) Marin Čilić	3	7	7^{9}
Q	(Slovakia) Norbert Gombos	6^{2}	6	6^{1}
(Poland) Kamil Majchrzak	7^{7}	3	7^{7}

Final
8	(Croatia) Marin Čilić	3	6	4
(Poland) Kamil Majchrzak	6	4	6

=== Top half ===
First round
1	(Croatia) B Ćorić	6	6
(Belgium) A Blockx	1	4
Alt	(Spain) D Rincón	6^{2}	6	5
Q	(Hungary) Z Piros	7^{7}	3	7
(Denmark) A Holmgren	6	6^{5}	7^{7}
(Finland) O Virtanen	3	7^{7}	6^{3}
LL	(Dominican Republic) N Hardt	6^{5}	2
7	(France) V Royer	7^{7}	6
3	(United Kingdom) B Harris	6	3	5
(Austria) S Ofner	4	6	7
Q	(Italy) L Giustino	6	5	5
(Lithuania) V Gaubas	4	7	7
(Argentina) M Trungelliti	6	6
WC	(Spain) D Mérida	3	3
Alt	(Peru) I Buse	3	5
8	(Croatia) M Čilić	6	7

Second round
1	(Croatia) B Ćorić	7	3	4
Q	(Hungary) Z Piros	5	6	6
(Denmark) A Holmgren	6^{4}	2
7	(France) V Royer	7^{7}	6
(Austria) S Ofner	6	3	3
(Lithuania) V Gaubas	4	6	6
(Argentina) M Trungelliti	2	6	1
8	(Croatia) M Čilić	6	4	6

Quarterfinals
Q	(Hungary) Z Piros	1^{r}
7	(France) V Royer	2
(Lithuania) V Gaubas	7^{8}	4	6^{4}
8	(Croatia) M Čilić	6^{6}	6	7^{7}

Semifinals
7	(France) V Royer	6	5	6^{7}
8	(Croatia) M Čilić	3	7	7^{9}

=== Bottom half ===
First round
5	P Kotov	6	6
(Lebanon) B Hassan	4	4
(Lithuania) E Butvilas	3	3
(Spain) A Moro Cañas	6	6
WC	(Spain) M Damas	4	3
Q	(Slovakia) N Gombos	6	6
(United States) T Boyer	5	3
4	(Kazakhstan) A Shevchenko	7	6
6/WC	(Spain) P Carreño Busta	6	6
Q	(Switzerland) J Paul	2	1
(France) C Hemery	6	2	6
Q	(Spain) B Zapata Miralles	3	6	4
(Spain) C Taberner	7	6
Q	(Spain) O Roca Batalla	5	2
(Poland) K Majchrzak	7^{7}	6
2	(Bolivia) H Dellien	6^{1}	1

Second round
5	P Kotov	6	5	7
(Spain) A Moro Cañas	4	7	5
Q	(Slovakia) N Gombos	7^{7}	7
4	(Kazakhstan) A Shevchenko	6^{4}	5
6/WC	(Spain) P Carreño Busta	6	5	7^{11}
(France) C Hemery	4	7	6^{9}
(Spain) C Taberner	4	4
(Poland) K Majchrzak	6	6

Quarterfinals
5	P Kotov	7^{10}	5	3
Q	(Slovakia) N Gombos	6^{8}	7	6
6/WC	(Spain) P Carreño Busta	7^{12}	4	1
(Poland) K Majchrzak	6^{10}	6	6

Semifinals
Q	(Slovakia) N Gombos	6^{2}	6	6^{1}
(Poland) K Majchrzak	7^{7}	3	7^{7}
