= 2022 Open Comunidad de Madrid – Doubles =

Doubles
- 2022 Open Comunidad de Madrid

Final
- Champions: (Czech Republic) Adam Pavlásek (Slovakia) Igor Zelenay
- Runners-up: (Brazil) Rafael Matos (Spain) David Vega Hernández
- Score: 6–3, 3–6, [10–6]

Events
Singles	Doubles
- Open Comunidad de Madrid

This was the first edition of the tournament.

Adam Pavlásek and Igor Zelenay won the title after defeating Rafael Matos and David Vega Hernández 6–3, 3–6, [10–6] in the final.

== Seeds ==
1. (Ukraine) Denys Molchanov / (Croatia) Franko Škugor (first round)
2. (Brazil) Rafael Matos / (Spain) David Vega Hernández (final)
3. (Portugal) Francisco Cabral / (France) Manuel Guinard (semifinals)
4. (Uruguay) Martín Cuevas / (Argentina) Guillermo Durán (quarterfinals)

== Draw ==
Key

- Q = Qualifier
- WC = Wild card
- LL = Lucky loser
- Alt = Alternate
- ITF = ITF entry
- PR = Protected ranking
- SR = Special ranking
- SE = Special exempt
- JE = Junior exempt
- JR = Junior Accelerator Programme entrant
- CO = College Accelerator Programme entrant
- NG = Next Gen Accelerator Program entrant
- w/o = Walkover
- r = Retired
- d = Defaulted

First round
1	(Ukraine) D Molchanov (Croatia) F Škugor	1	5
(Spain) J Barranco Cosano (Italy) R Brancaccio	6	7
(Czech Republic) A Pavlásek (Slovakia) I Zelenay	6	6
(Germany) M Marterer (Germany) M Moraing	2	2
3	(Portugal) F Cabral (France) M Guinard	6	6
(Italy) M Bortolotti (India) A Kadhe	2	4
WC	(Spain) John Echeverría (Spain) A Moro Cañas	5	7^{7}	[10]
I Liutarevich (Ukraine) V Manafov	7	6^{1}	[6]
Alt	(Turkey) A Çelikbilek (Kazakhstan) D Yevseyev	7^{7}	5	[10]
(Uzbekistan) S Fayziev (Kazakhstan) G Lomakin	6^{5}	7	[7]
(Australia) T Fancutt (Australia) C O'Connell	3	7^{7}	[6]
4	(Uruguay) M Cuevas (Argentina) G Durán	6	6^{5}	[10]
WC	(Spain) M Damas (Netherlands) Ryan Nijboer	3	0
(Romania) VV Cornea (Germany) F Fallert	6	6
Alt	(Portugal) Gonçalo Falcão (Portugal) P Sousa	3	2
2	(Brazil) R Matos (Spain) D Vega Hernández	6	6

Quarterfinals
(Spain) J Barranco Cosano (Italy) R Brancaccio	2	2
(Czech Republic) A Pavlásek (Slovakia) I Zelenay	6	6
3	(Portugal) F Cabral (France) M Guinard	1	6	[10]
WC	(Spain) J Echeverría (Spain) A Moro Cañas	6	4	[5]
Alt	(Turkey) A Çelikbilek (Kazakhstan) D Yevseyev	7^{7}	6
4	(Uruguay) M Cuevas (Argentina) G Durán	6^{2}	4
(Romania) VV Cornea (Germany) F Fallert	6	5	[6]
2	(Brazil) R Matos (Spain) D Vega Hernández	0	7	[10]

Semifinals
(Czech Republic) A Pavlásek (Slovakia) I Zelenay	6	6
3	(Portugal) F Cabral (France) M Guinard	3	3
Alt	(Turkey) A Çelikbilek (Kazakhstan) D Yevseyev	1	3
2	(Brazil) R Matos (Spain) D Vega Hernández	6	6

Final
(Czech Republic) A Pavlásek (Slovakia) I Zelenay	6	3	[10]
2	(Brazil) R Matos (Spain) D Vega Hernández	3	6	[6]
