= 2024 Open Comunidad de Madrid – Doubles =

Doubles
- 2024 Open Comunidad de Madrid

Final
- Champions: (Finland) Harri Heliövaara (United Kingdom) Henry Patten
- Runners-up: (Argentina) Guido Andreozzi (Mexico) Miguel Ángel Reyes-Varela
- Score: 7–5, 7–6^{(7–1)}

Events
Singles	Doubles
- Open Comunidad de Madrid

Ivan Liutarevich and Vladyslav Manafov were the defending champions but lost in the first round to Fernando Romboli and Marcelo Zormann.

Harri Heliövaara and Henry Patten won the title, defeating Guido Andreozzi and Miguel Ángel Reyes-Varela 7–5, 7–6^{(7–1)} in the final.

== Seeds ==
1. (Colombia) Nicolás Barrientos / (Brazil) Rafael Matos (quarterfinals)
2. (Uruguay) Ariel Behar / (India) Yuki Bhambri (first round)
3. (Portugal) Francisco Cabral / (Kazakhstan) Aleksandr Nedovyesov (first round)
4. (Finland) Harri Heliövaara / (United Kingdom) Henry Patten (champions)

== Draw ==
Key

- Q = Qualifier
- WC = Wild card
- LL = Lucky loser
- Alt = Alternate
- ITF = ITF entry
- PR = Protected ranking
- SR = Special ranking
- SE = Special exempt
- JE = Junior exempt
- JR = Junior Accelerator Programme entrant
- CO = College Accelerator Programme entrant
- NG = Next Gen Accelerator Program entrant
- w/o = Walkover
- r = Retired
- d = Defaulted

=== Draw ===
First round
1	(Colombia) N Barrientos (Brazil) R Matos	6	6
(Ecuador) D Hidalgo (Colombia) C Rodríguez	4	4
I Liutarevich (Ukraine) V Manafov	6^{1}	6^{2}
(Brazil) F Romboli (Brazil) M Zormann	7^{7}	7^{7}
4	(Finland) H Heliövaara (United Kingdom) H Patten	6	6^{4}	[10]
(France) T Arribagé (Romania) VV Cornea	4	7^{7}	[7]
(Bolivia) B Arias (Bolivia) F Zeballos	5	7^{10}	[19]
(Netherlands) S Arends (Netherlands) M Middelkoop	7	6^{8}	[17]
WC	(Spain) M Damas (Spain) A Moro Cañas	6	1	[5]
(Argentina) G Andreozzi (Mexico) MÁ Reyes-Varela	3	6	[10]
(Czech Republic) P Nouza (Czech Republic) P Rikl	6	1	[10]
3	(Portugal) F Cabral (Kazakhstan) A Nedovyesov	4	6	[5]
(Italy) M Bortolotti (Spain) S Martos Gornés	6	7^{7}
WC	(Pakistan) A-u-H Qureshi (Spain) D Vega Hernández	2	6^{3}
(Brazil) M Demoliner (Brazil) O Luz	6	4	[10]
2	(Uruguay) A Behar (India) Y Bhambri	3	6	[7]

Quarterfinals
1	(Colombia) N Barrientos (Brazil) R Matos	6^{6}	7^{7}	[5]
(Brazil) F Romboli (Brazil) M Zormann	7^{8}	6^{2}	[10]
4	(Finland) H Heliövaara (United Kingdom) H Patten	6	6
(Bolivia) B Arias (Bolivia) F Zeballos	3	2
(Argentina) G Andreozzi (Mexico) MÁ Reyes-Varela	1	6	[10]
(Czech Republic) P Nouza (Czech Republic) P Rikl	6	2	[7]
(Italy) M Bortolotti (Spain) S Martos Gornés	6^{4}	7^{7}	[7]
(Brazil) M Demoliner (Brazil) O Luz	7^{7}	6^{3}	[10]

Semifinals
(Brazil) F Romboli (Brazil) M Zormann	4	1
4	(Finland) H Heliövaara (United Kingdom) H Patten	6	6
(Argentina) G Andreozzi (Mexico) MÁ Reyes-Varela	6	6
(Brazil) M Demoliner (Brazil) O Luz	3	4

Final
4	(Finland) H Heliövaara (United Kingdom) H Patten	7	7^{7}
(Argentina) G Andreozzi (Mexico) MÁ Reyes-Varela	5	6^{1}
