= 2023 Open Comunidad de Madrid – Singles =

Singles
- 2023 Open Comunidad de Madrid

Final
- Champion: Alexander Shevchenko
- Runner-up: (Argentina) Pedro Cachin
- Score: 6–4, 6–3

Events
Singles	Doubles
- Open Comunidad de Madrid

Pedro Cachin was the defending champion but lost in the final to Alexander Shevchenko.

Shevchenko won the title after defeating Cachin 6–4, 6–3 in the final.

== Seeds ==
1. (Argentina) Pedro Cachin (final)
2. Alexander Shevchenko (champion)
3. (Italy) Francesco Passaro (semifinals)
4. (Croatia) Borna Gojo (first round)
5. (Austria) Sebastian Ofner (quarterfinals)
6. (France) Hugo Grenier (first round)
7. (Italy) Raúl Brancaccio (second round)
8. (Slovakia) Jozef Kovalík (first round)

== Draw ==
Key

- Q = Qualifier
- WC = Wild card
- LL = Lucky loser
- Alt = Alternate
- ITF = ITF entry
- PR = Protected ranking
- SR = Special ranking
- SE = Special exempt
- JE = Junior exempt
- JR = Junior Accelerator Programme entrant
- CO = College Accelerator Programme entrant
- NG = Next Gen Accelerator Program entrant
- w/o = Walkover
- r = Retired
- d = Defaulted

=== Finals ===
Semifinals
1	(Argentina) Pedro Cachin	6	6
(Argentina) Andrea Collarini	3	3
3	(Italy) Francesco Passaro	6	2	3
2	Alexander Shevchenko	0	6	6

Final
1	(Argentina) Pedro Cachin	4	3
2	Alexander Shevchenko	6	6

=== Top half ===
First round
1	(Argentina) P Cachin	6	6^{3}	6
LL	(Australia) A Santillan	4	7^{7}	2
WC	(Spain) A Moro Cañas	6	6
(Kazakhstan) T Skatov	3	3
LL	(Germany) H Squire	6^{5}	6	6
(Portugal) F Ferreira Silva	7^{7}	4	3
Q	(Spain) J Martí	5	4
5	(Austria) S Ofner	7	6
4	(Croatia) B Gojo	2	6	5
(Argentina) A Collarini	6	1	7
Alt	(Australia) O Jasika	4	6	2
(Italy) L Giustino	6	4	6
(Serbia) M Zekić	6	7^{7}
(Italy) R Bonadio	3	6^{4}
Alt	(France) T Droguet	6	6^{6}	5
7	(Italy) R Brancaccio	1	7^{8}	7

Second round
1	(Argentina) P Cachin	2	7^{8}	6
WC	(Spain) A Moro Cañas	6	6^{6}	2
LL	(Germany) H Squire	6^{6}	1
5	(Austria) S Ofner	7^{8}	6
(Argentina) A Collarini	6	3	6
(Italy) L Giustino	2	6	2
(Serbia) M Zekić	6^{3}	7^{7}	6
7	(Italy) R Brancaccio	7^{7}	6^{5}	3

Quarterfinals
1	(Argentina) P Cachin	6	3	6
5	(Austria) S Ofner	3	6	4
(Argentina) A Collarini	6	6
(Serbia) M Zekić	0	4

Semifinals
1	(Argentina) P Cachin	6	6
(Argentina) A Collarini	3	3

=== Bottom half ===
First round
8	(Slovakia) J Kovalík	6	2	3
WC	(Spain) M Landaluce	3	6	6
Q	(Spain) D Rincón	6	6^{2}	4
(United States) N Moreno de Alboran	2	7^{7}	6
(Netherlands) J Sels	1	3
Q	(Norway) V Durasovic	6	6
(United States) Em Nava	1	2
3	(Italy) F Passaro	6	6
6	(France) H Grenier	2	4
(Argentina) M Trungelliti	6	6
LL	(Spain) Sergi Pérez Contri	7^{13}	3	6
Q	A Vatutin	6^{11}	6	1
WC	(Spain) M Damas	6	6
Q	(Spain) N Sánchez Izquierdo	4	4
Q	(United Kingdom) B Harris	2	6	3
2	A Shevchenko	6	4	6

Second round
WC	(Spain) M Landaluce	3	5
(United States) N Moreno de Alboran	6	7
Q	(Norway) V Durasovic	3	2
3	(Italy) F Passaro	6	6
(Argentina) M Trungelliti	2	3
LL	(Spain) S Pérez Contri	6	6
WC	(Spain) M Damas	4	6^{5}
2	A Shevchenko	6	7^{7}

Quarterfinals
(United States) N Moreno de Alboran	1	6^{5}
3	(Italy) F Passaro	6	7^{7}
LL	(Spain) S Pérez Contri	4	2
2	A Shevchenko	6	6

Semifinals
3	(Italy) F Passaro	6	2	3
2	A Shevchenko	0	6	6
