= 2023 Open Comunidad de Madrid – Doubles =

Doubles
- 2023 Open Comunidad de Madrid

Final
- Champions: Ivan Liutarevich (Ukraine) Vladyslav Manafov
- Runners-up: (Finland) Patrik Niklas-Salminen (Netherlands) Bart Stevens
- Score: 6–4, 6–4

Events
Singles	Doubles
- Open Comunidad de Madrid

Adam Pavlásek and Igor Zelenay were the defending champions but only Zelenay chose to defend his title, partnering Petr Nouza. Zelenay lost in the first round to Andrew Harris and John-Patrick Smith.

Ivan Liutarevich and Vladyslav Manafov won the title after defeating Patrik Niklas-Salminen and Bart Stevens 6–4, 6–4 in the final.

== Seeds ==
1. (Colombia) Nicolás Barrientos / (Uruguay) Ariel Behar (quarterfinals)
2. (India) Sriram Balaji / (India) Jeevan Nedunchezhiyan (semifinals)
3. (Romania) Victor Vlad Cornea / (Brazil) Marcelo Demoliner (quarterfinals)
4. (Australia) Andrew Harris / (Australia) John-Patrick Smith (quarterfinals)

== Draw ==
Key

- Q = Qualifier
- WC = Wild card
- LL = Lucky loser
- Alt = Alternate
- ITF = ITF entry
- PR = Protected ranking
- SR = Special ranking
- SE = Special exempt
- JE = Junior exempt
- JR = Junior Accelerator Programme entrant
- CO = College Accelerator Programme entrant
- NG = Next Gen Accelerator Program entrant
- w/o = Walkover
- r = Retired
- d = Defaulted

First round
1	(Colombia) N Barrientos (Uruguay) A Behar	7^{7}	3	[10]
(South Korea) J-s Nam (South Korea) M-k Song	6^{4}	6	[3]
(Italy) R Bonadio (United States) N Moreno de Alboran	3	4
(Brazil) O Luz (Brazil) M Zormann	6	6
3	(Romania) VV Cornea (Brazil) M Demoliner	6	6
WC	(Spain) Miguel Avendaño Cadena (Spain) R Jódar	3	2
I Liutarevich (Ukraine) V Manafov	5	6	[10]
(Switzerland) L Margaroli (Brazil) F Romboli	7	3	[6]
(Netherlands) S Arends (Netherlands) J Sels	6^{4}	5
(Finland) P Niklas-Salminen (Netherlands) B Stevens	7^{7}	7
(Czech Republic) P Nouza (Slovakia) I Zelenay	6^{1}	6^{5}
4	(Australia) A Harris (Australia) J-P Smith	7^{7}	7^{7}
(Italy) R Brancaccio (Italy) F Passaro
WC	(Spain) M Damas (Spain) A Moro Cañas	w/o
Alt	E Karlovskiy; A Shevchenko	6^{6}	4
2	(India) S Balaji (India) J Nedunchezhiyan	7^{8}	6

Quarterfinals
1	(Colombia) N Barrientos (Uruguay) A Behar	7^{8}	2	[6]
(Brazil) O Luz (Brazil) M Zormann	6^{6}	6	[10]
3	(Romania) VV Cornea (Brazil) M Demoliner	6^{4}	6	[4]
I Liutarevich (Ukraine) V Manafov	7^{7}	1	[10]
(Finland) P Niklas-Salminen (Netherlands) B Stevens	6	4	[10]
4	(Australia) A Harris (Australia) J-P Smith	4	6	[6]
WC	(Spain) M Damas (Spain) A Moro Cañas	6^{4}	4
2	(India) S Balaji (India) J Nedunchezhiyan	7^{7}	6

Semifinals
(Brazil) O Luz (Brazil) M Zormann	6^{10}	7^{7}	[6]
I Liutarevich (Ukraine) V Manafov	7^{12}	6^{4}	[10]
(Finland) P Niklas-Salminen (Netherlands) B Stevens	1	6	[10]
2	(India) S Balaji (India) J Nedunchezhiyan	6	3	[8]

Final
I Liutarevich (Ukraine) V Manafov	6	6
(Finland) P Niklas-Salminen (Netherlands) B Stevens	4	4
