= 2022 Open Comunidad de Madrid – Singles =

Singles
- 2022 Open Comunidad de Madrid

Final
- Champion: (Argentina) Pedro Cachin
- Runner-up: (Argentina) Marco Trungelliti
- Score: 6–3, 6–7^{(3–7)}, 6–3

Events
Singles	Doubles
- Open Comunidad de Madrid

This was the first edition of the tournament.

Pedro Cachin won the title after defeating Marco Trungelliti 6–3, 6–7^{(3–7)}, 6–3 in the final.

== Seeds ==
1. (Spain) Roberto Carballés Baena (semifinals)
2. (Brazil) Thiago Monteiro (semifinals)
3. (Spain) Feliciano López (first round, withdrew)
4. (Spain) Fernando Verdasco (second round)
5. (Germany) Mats Moraing (second round)
6. (France) Lucas Pouille (quarterfinals)
7. (Chinese Taipei) Tseng Chun-hsin (withdrew)
8. (Serbia) Nikola Milojević (first round)
9. (Australia) Christopher O'Connell (quarterfinals)

== Draw ==
Key

- Q = Qualifier
- WC = Wild card
- LL = Lucky loser
- Alt = Alternate
- ITF = ITF entry
- PR = Protected ranking
- SR = Special ranking
- SE = Special exempt
- JE = Junior exempt
- JR = Junior Accelerator Programme entrant
- CO = College Accelerator Programme entrant
- NG = Next Gen Accelerator Program entrant
- w/o = Walkover
- r = Retired
- d = Defaulted

=== Finals ===
Semifinals
1/WC	(Spain) Roberto Carballés Baena	5	2
(Argentina) Pedro Cachin	7	6
(Argentina) Marco Trungelliti	7^{7}	7^{7}
2	(Brazil) Thiago Monteiro	6^{1}	6^{5}

Final
(Argentina) Pedro Cachin	6	6^{3}	6
(Argentina) Marco Trungelliti	3	7^{7}	3

=== Top half ===
First round
1/WC	(Spain) R Carballés Baena	7^{7}	6
(Kazakhstan) D Popko	6^{4}	1
(Italy) GM Moroni	6	6^{3}	5
P Kotov	3	7^{7}	7
(Kazakhstan) T Skatov	6	6^{4}	4
Q	(Spain) O Roca Batalla	4	7^{7}	6
(Germany) M Marterer	0	6^{4}
6/WC	(France) L Pouille	6	7^{7}
4	(Spain) F Verdasco	6	6
(Bulgaria) D Kuzmanov	3	4
(Portugal) G Elias
(France) M Guinard	w/o
LL	(Spain) J Barranco Cosano	4	6	4
(Argentina) P Cachin	6	4	6
(Turkey) A Çelikbilek	7^{7}	7
8	(Serbia) N Milojević	6^{4}	5

Second round
1/WC	(Spain) R Carballés Baena	5	7^{7}	6
P Kotov	7	6^{5}	2
Q	(Spain) O Roca Batalla	2	6	4
6/WC	(France) L Pouille	6	4	6
4	(Spain) F Verdasco	6^{4}	5
(France) M Guinard	7^{7}	7
(Argentina) P Cachin	6	6
(Turkey) A Çelikbilek	4	2

Quarterfinals
1/WC	(Spain) R Carballés Baena	6	6
6/WC	(France) L Pouille	4	4
(France) M Guinard	7^{7}	1	1
(Argentina) P Cachin	6^{5}	6	6

Semifinals
1/WC	(Spain) R Carballés Baena	5	2
(Argentina) P Cachin	7	6

=== Bottom half ===
First round
9	(Australia) C O'Connell	6	6
Q	(Switzerland) J Nikles	3	2
Q	(Ukraine) O Krutykh	1	7^{7}	7
Alt	(Croatia) D Ajduković	6	6^{2}	5
(Italy) A Giannessi	2	6	3
(Argentina) M Trungelliti	6	2	6
Q	(Italy) R Brancaccio	w/o
3	(Spain) F López
5	(Germany) M Moraing	6	6
Alt	(France) M Bourgue	4	2
PR	(Austria) S Ofner	6	6
Q	(Israel) Y Oliel	4	4
WC	(Spain) M Damas	6^{6}	1
(Hungary) Z Piros	7^{8}	6
Q	(Portugal) P Sousa	6^{1}	2
2	(Brazil) T Monteiro	7^{7}	6

Second round
9	(Australia) C O'Connell	6	7
Q	(Ukraine) O Krutykh	1	5
(Argentina) M Trungelliti	6	6
Q	(Italy) R Brancaccio	2	3
5	(Germany) M Moraing	3	2
PR	(Austria) S Ofner	6	6
(Hungary) Z Piros	4	6	4
2	(Brazil) T Monteiro	6	2	6

Quarterfinals
9	(Australia) C O'Connell	7^{9}	4	2
(Argentina) M Trungelliti	6^{7}	6	6
PR	(Austria) S Ofner	4	4
2	(Brazil) T Monteiro	6	6

Semifinals
(Argentina) M Trungelliti	7^{7}	7^{7}
2	(Brazil) T Monteiro	6^{1}	6^{5}
