= 2026 Open Comunidad de Madrid – Doubles =

Doubles
- 2026 Open Comunidad de Madrid

Final
- Champions: (Czech Republic) Andrew Paulson (Czech Republic) Michael Vrbenský
- Runners-up: (United States) George Goldhoff (United States) Trey Hilderbrand
- Score: 2–6, 6–4, [10–8]

Events
Singles	Doubles
- Open Comunidad de Madrid

Francisco Cabral and Lucas Miedler were the defending champions but chose not to defend their title.

Andrew Paulson and Michael Vrbenský won the title after defeating George Goldhoff and Trey Hilderbrand 2–6, 6–4, [10–8] in the final.

== Seeds ==
1. (United States) George Goldhoff / (United States) Trey Hilderbrand (final)
2. (India) Siddhant Banthia / (Bulgaria) Alexander Donski (semifinals)
3. (Czech Republic) Andrew Paulson / (Czech Republic) Michael Vrbenský (champions)
4. (Romania) Alexandru Jecan / (Romania) Bogdan Pavel (semifinals)

== Draw ==
Key

- Q = Qualifier
- WC = Wild card
- LL = Lucky loser
- Alt = Alternate
- ITF = ITF entry
- PR = Protected ranking
- SR = Special ranking
- SE = Special exempt
- JE = Junior exempt
- JR = Junior Accelerator Programme entrant
- CO = College Accelerator Programme entrant
- NG = Next Gen Accelerator Program entrant
- w/o = Walkover
- r = Retired
- d = Defaulted

First round
1	(United States) G Goldhoff (United States) T Hilderbrand	6	2	[10]
Alt	(Italy) F Agamenone (Spain) N Sánchez Izquierdo	3	6	[6]
(Czech Republic) D Poljak (Germany) T Rühl	6	5	[8]
(Spain) D Vega Hernández (Spain) B Winter López	3	7	[10]
4	(Romania) A Jecan (Romania) B Pavel	6	7
(France) G Jacq (Poland) S Walków	4	5
(Sweden) E Grevelius (Sweden) A Heinonen	6	6
(Thailand) P Isaro (India) N Kaliyanda Poonacha	3	4
(Spain) S Martos Gornés (India) VSP Natarajan	2	4
Alt	(Spain) I Montes de la Torre (Luxembourg) C Rodesch	6	6
WC	(Spain) Daniel Ledesma Pineda (Spain) Diego José Manrique Velázquez	2	3
3	(Czech Republic) A Paulson (Czech Republic) M Vrbenský	6	6
(Australia) B Bayldon (Ukraine) D Molchanov	6^{5}	4
(Slovakia) M Karol (Czech Republic) Z Kolář	7^{7}	6
(Spain) Í Cervantes (Spain) B Pujol Navarro	5	3
2	(India) S Banthia (Bulgaria) A Donski	7	6

Quarterfinals
1	(United States) G Goldhoff (United States) T Hilderbrand	7^{7}	7
(Spain) D Vega Hernández (Spain) B Winter López	6^{3}	5
4	(Romania) A Jecan (Romania) B Pavel	6	6
(Sweden) E Grevelius (Sweden) A Heinonen	3	4
Alt	(Spain) I Montes de la Torre (Luxembourg) C Rodesch	4	6^{3}
3	(Czech Republic) A Paulson (Czech Republic) M Vrbenský	6	7^{7}
(Slovakia) M Karol (Czech Republic) Z Kolář	5	3
2	(India) S Banthia (Bulgaria) A Donski	7	6

Semifinals
1	(United States) G Goldhoff (United States) T Hilderbrand	6	2	[10]
4	(Romania) A Jecan (Romania) B Pavel	3	6	[6]
3	(Czech Republic) A Paulson (Czech Republic) M Vrbenský	7	6
2	(India) S Banthia (Bulgaria) A Donski	5	1

Final
1	(United States) G Goldhoff (United States) T Hilderbrand	6	4	[8]
3	(Czech Republic) A Paulson (Czech Republic) M Vrbenský	2	6	[10]
