= 2024 Open Comunidad de Madrid – Singles =

Singles
- 2024 Open Comunidad de Madrid

Final
- Champion: (Italy) Stefano Napolitano
- Runner-up: (Switzerland) Leandro Riedi
- Score: 6–3, 6–3

Events
Singles	Doubles
- Open Comunidad de Madrid

Alexander Shevchenko was the defending champion but chose not to defend his title.

Stefano Napolitano won the title after defeating Leandro Riedi 6–3, 6–3 in the final.

== Seeds ==
1. (Japan) Taro Daniel (first round)
2. (Spain) Albert Ramos Viñolas (quarterfinals)
3. (Argentina) Camilo Ugo Carabelli (withdrew)
4. (China) Shang Juncheng (second round)
5. (Czech Republic) Vít Kopřiva (second round)
6. (Austria) Jurij Rodionov (semifinals)
7. (France) Harold Mayot (second round)
8. (Kazakhstan) Mikhail Kukushkin (semifinals, retired)

== Draw ==
Key

- Q = Qualifier
- WC = Wild card
- LL = Lucky loser
- Alt = Alternate
- ITF = ITF entry
- PR = Protected ranking
- SR = Special ranking
- SE = Special exempt
- JE = Junior exempt
- JR = Junior Accelerator Programme entrant
- CO = College Accelerator Programme entrant
- NG = Next Gen Accelerator Program entrant
- w/o = Walkover
- r = Retired
- d = Defaulted

=== Finals ===
Semifinals
6	(Austria) Jurij Rodionov	6	3	6^{3}
(Switzerland) Leandro Riedi	4	6	7^{7}
(Italy) Stefano Napolitano	6	4
8	(Kazakhstan) Mikhail Kukushkin	2	1^{r}

Final
(Switzerland) Leandro Riedi	3	3
(Italy) Stefano Napolitano	6	6

=== Top half ===
First round
1	(Japan) T Daniel	7^{7}	5	3
(Italy) G Zeppieri	6^{1}	7	6
Q	(Spain) C Taberner	4	6	4
(Germany) B Hassan	6	0	6
Q	(Spain) D Rincón	3	5
(Spain) B Zapata Miralles	6	7
(Kazakhstan) D Yevseyev	3	6	4
6	(Austria) J Rodionov	6	2	6
LL	(Italy) F Passaro	3	6	5
(Ukraine) V Sachko	6	4	7
Q	(Peru) I Buse	3	5
(Switzerland) L Riedi	6	7
(Brazil) J Fonseca	4	6	6
Q	(Argentina) G Andreozzi	6	4	2
(Belgium) J De Loore	2	6	6^{4}
7	(France) H Mayot	6	1	7^{7}

Second round
(Italy) G Zeppieri	6	3	2
(Germany) B Hassan	3	6	6
(Spain) B Zapata Miralles	4	2
6	(Austria) J Rodionov	6	6
(Ukraine) V Sachko	3	2
(Switzerland) L Riedi	6	6
(Brazil) J Fonseca	6	3	6
7	(France) H Mayot	2	6	3

Quarterfinals
(Germany) B Hassan	1	4
6	(Austria) J Rodionov	6	6
(Switzerland) L Riedi	6	7^{7}
(Brazil) J Fonseca	3	6^{4}

Semifinals
6	(Austria) J Rodionov	6	3	6^{3}
(Switzerland) L Riedi	4	6	7^{7}

=== Bottom half ===
First round
5	(Czech Republic) V Kopřiva	6	6
WC	(Spain) M Landaluce	3	3
(Lithuania) V Gaubas	3	2
(Italy) S Napolitano	6	6
(France) H Grenier	2	2
Q	(Switzerland) M-A Hüsler	6	6
WC	(Spain) A Moro Cañas	5	2
4	(China) J Shang	7	6
8	(Kazakhstan) M Kukushkin	6	6
(United States) N Moreno de Alboran	4	4
SE	(Dominican Republic) N Hardt	3	4
(Germany) R Molleker	6	6
(Spain) O Roca Batalla	4	6	4
(France) B Paire	6	3	2^{r}
Q	(Jordan) A Shelbayh	1	6	2
2/WC	(Spain) A Ramos Viñolas	6	1	6

Second round
5	(Czech Republic) V Kopřiva	6^{7}	5
(Italy) S Napolitano	7^{9}	7
Q	(Switzerland) M-A Hüsler	6	3	7
4	(China) J Shang	4	6	5
8	(Kazakhstan) M Kukushkin	6^{1}	6	6
(Germany) R Molleker	7^{7}	1	1
(Spain) O Roca Batalla	6^{2}	4
2/WC	(Spain) A Ramos Viñolas	7^{7}	6

Quarterfinals
(Italy) S Napolitano	6	7^{7}
Q	(Switzerland) M-A Hüsler	2	6^{5}
8	(Kazakhstan) M Kukushkin	7^{7}	4	7^{7}
2/WC	(Spain) A Ramos Viñolas	6^{3}	6	6^{5}

Semifinals
(Italy) S Napolitano	6	4
8	(Kazakhstan) M Kukushkin	2	1^{r}
