= 2024 Open Comunidad de Madrid =

- Date: 8–14 April
- Edition: 3rd
- Surface: Clay
- Location: Madrid, Spain

Champions

Singles
- (Italy) Stefano Napolitano

Doubles
- (Finland) Harri Heliövaara / (United Kingdom) Henry Patten
- Open Comunidad de Madrid

The 2024 Open Comunidad de Madrid was a professional tennis tournament played on clay courts. It was the 3rd edition of the tournament which was part of the 2024 ATP Challenger Tour. It took place in Madrid, Spain between 8 and 14 April 2024.

== Singles main-draw entrants ==
=== Seeds ===
Country	Player	Rank^{1}	Seed
JPN	Taro Daniel	84	1
ESP	Albert Ramos Viñolas	103	2
~~ARG~~	~~Camilo Ugo Carabelli~~	~~106~~	~~3~~
CHN	Shang Juncheng	113	4
CZE	Vít Kopřiva	118	5
AUT	Jurij Rodionov	119	6
FRA	Harold Mayot	129	7
KAZ	Mikhail Kukushkin	139	8

- ^{1} Rankings are as of 1 April 2024.

=== Other entrants ===
The following players received wildcards into the singles main draw:

- (Spain) Martín Landaluce
- (Spain) Alejandro Moro Cañas
- (Spain) Albert Ramos Viñolas

The following player received entry into the singles main draw as a special exempt:

- (Dominican Republic) Nick Hardt

The following players received entry from the qualifying draw:

- (Argentina) Guido Andreozzi
- (Peru) Ignacio Buse
- (Switzerland) Marc-Andrea Hüsler
- (Spain) Daniel Rincón
- (Jordan) Abdullah Shelbayh
- (Spain) Carlos Taberner

The following player received entry as a lucky loser:

- (Italy) Francesco Passaro

== Champions ==
=== Singles ===
- (Italy) Stefano Napolitano def. (Switzerland) Leandro Riedi 6–3, 6–3.

=== Doubles ===
- (Finland) Harri Heliövaara / (United Kingdom) Henry Patten def. (Argentina) Guido Andreozzi / (Mexico) Miguel Ángel Reyes-Varela 7–5, 7–6^{(7–1)}.
