= 2021 Pekao Szczecin Open – Singles =

Singles
- 2021 Pekao Szczecin Open

Final
- Champion: (Czech Republic) Zdeněk Kolář
- Runner-up: (Poland) Kamil Majchrzak
- Score: 7–6^{(7–4)}, 7–5

Events
| Singles | Doubles |
- Pekao Szczecin Open

Jozef Kovalík was the defending champion but chose not to defend his title.

Zdeněk Kolář won the title after defeating Kamil Majchrzak 7–6^{(7–4)}, 7–5 in the final.

== Seeds ==
1. (Spain) Albert Ramos Viñolas (first round)
2. (Spain) Pablo Andújar (second round)
3. (Spain) Pedro Martínez (withdrew)
4. (Italy) Marco Cecchinato (second round)
5. (Czech Republic) Jiří Veselý (first round)
6. (Brazil) Thiago Monteiro (second round)
7. (Spain) Roberto Carballés Baena (second round)
8. (Italy) Stefano Travaglia (second round)

== Draw ==
Key

- Q = Qualifier
- WC = Wild card
- LL = Lucky loser
- Alt = Alternate
- ITF = ITF entry
- PR = Protected ranking
- SR = Special ranking
- SE = Special exempt
- JE = Junior exempt
- JR = Junior Accelerator Programme entrant
- CO = College Accelerator Programme entrant
- NG = Next Gen Accelerator Program entrant
- w/o = Walkover
- r = Retired
- d = Defaulted

=== Finals ===
Semifinals
Q | (Spain) Nicola Kuhn | 5 | 2^{r}
(Czech Republic) Zdeněk Kolář | 7 | 2
(Germany) Yannick Hanfmann | 3 | 3
(Poland) Kamil Majchrzak | 6 | 6

Final
(Czech Republic) Zdeněk Kolář | 7^{7} | 7
(Poland) Kamil Majchrzak | 6^{4} | 5

=== Top half ===
First round
1/WC | (Spain) A Ramos Viñolas | 6 | 4 | 4
Q | (Spain) N Kuhn | 1 | 6 | 6
(Serbia) D Petrović | 1 | 2
Q | (United States) A Rybakov | 6 | 6
(Argentina) M Trungelliti | 4 | 6 | 6
LL | (France) M Martineau | 6 | 4 | 3
(Canada) S Diez | 0 | 3
6 | (Brazil) T Monteiro | 6 | 6
LL | (Netherlands) J de Jong | 7^{7} | 3 | 7^{7}
(Czech Republic) J Lehečka | 6^{5} | 6 | 6^{3}
WC | (Poland) D Michalski | 3 | 6 | 1
(United States) T-S Kwiatkowski | 6 | 4 | 6
Q | (Russia) A Vatutin | 0 | 0^{r}
(United Kingdom) J Clarke | 6 | 4
(Czech Republic) Z Kolář | 7^{9} | 6
5 | (Czech Republic) J Veselý | 6^{7} | 3

Second round
Q | (Spain) N Kuhn | 6 | 6
Q | (United States) A Rybakov | 2 | 2
(Argentina) M Trungelliti | 6 | 6
6 | (Brazil) T Monteiro | 4 | 3
LL | (Netherlands) J de Jong | 6 | 7^{7}
(United States) T-S Kwiatkowski | 4 | 6^{1}
(United Kingdom) J Clarke | 1 | 1
(Czech Republic) Z Kolář | 6 | 6

Quarterfinals
Q | (Spain) N Kuhn | 6 | 7
(Argentina) M Trungelliti | 1 | 5
LL | (Netherlands) J de Jong | 2 | 3
(Czech Republic) Z Kolář | 6 | 6

Semifinals
Q | (Spain) N Kuhn | 5 | 2^{r}
(Czech Republic) Z Kolář | 7 | 2

=== Bottom half ===
First round
8 | (Italy) S Travaglia | 3 | 6 | 6
(India) S Nagal | 6 | 1 | 4
WC | (Poland) Paweł Ciaś | 6 | 4 | 6
(Czech Republic) V Kopřiva | 2 | 6 | 4
(Germany) Y Hanfmann | 3 | 6 | 6
(France) H Gaston | 6 | 3 | 3
(Austria) D Novak | 3 | 3
4 | (Italy) M Cecchinato | 6 | 6
7 | (Spain) R Carballés Baena | 6 | 7^{7}
Q | (Ukraine) V Sachko | 3 | 6^{5}
(Poland) K Majchrzak | 6 | 7^{9}
Alt | (Italy) A Pellegrino | 3 | 6^{7}
(Japan) T Daniel | 3 | 5
(Denmark) H Rune | 6 | 7
(Spain) C Taberner | 6^{2} | 4
2 | (Spain) P Andújar | 7^{7} | 6

Second round
8 | (Italy) S Travaglia | 6^{3} | 6 | 2
WC | (Poland) P Ciaś | 7^{7} | 3 | 6
(Germany) Y Hanfmann | 6 | 4 | 7^{7}
4 | (Italy) M Cecchinato | 3 | 6 | 6^{2}
7 | (Spain) R Carballés Baena | 3 | 2
(Poland) K Majchrzak | 6 | 6
(Denmark) H Rune | 6 | 6
2 | (Spain) P Andújar | 1 | 1

Quarterfinals
WC | (Poland) P Ciaś | 2 | 5
(Germany) Y Hanfmann | 6 | 7
(Poland) K Majchrzak | 7^{7} | 6
(Denmark) H Rune | 6^{5} | 1

Semifinals
(Germany) Y Hanfmann | 3 | 3
(Poland) K Majchrzak | 6 | 6
