= 2026 Open Comunidad de Madrid =

- Date: 6–12 April
- Edition: 5th
- Surface: Clay
- Location: Madrid, Spain

Champions

Singles
- (Hungary) Zsombor Piros

Doubles
- (Czech Republic) Andrew Paulson / (Czech Republic) Michael Vrbenský
- Open Comunidad de Madrid

The 2026 Grand Prix Open Comunidad de Madrid by Silverway was a professional tennis tournament played on clay courts. It was the fifth edition of the tournament which was part of the 2026 ATP Challenger Tour. It took place in Madrid, Spain between 6 and 12 April 2026.

== Singles main-draw entrants ==
=== Seeds ===
Country	Player	Rank^{1}	Seed
~~ESP~~	~~Daniel Mérida~~	~~136~~	~~1~~
FRA	Arthur Géa	137	2
LUX	Chris Rodesch	145	3
ESP	Pablo Llamas Ruiz	151	4
HUN	Zsombor Piros	153	5
CHI	Nicolás Jarry	154	6
FRA	Ugo Blanchet	157	7
GBR	Toby Samuel	172	8

- ^{1} Rankings are as of 30 March 2026.

=== Other entrants ===
The following players received wildcards into the singles main draw:

- (Spain) Miguel Damas
- (Spain) Sergi Pérez Contri
- (Spain) Daniel Rincón

The following player received entry into the singles main draw as a special exempt:

- (Spain) Àlex Martínez

The following players received entry into the singles main draw through the Junior Accelerator programme:

- (Switzerland) Henry Bernet
- (Bulgaria) Ivan Ivanov

The following players received entry into the singles main draw as alternates:

- (Spain) Pol Martín Tiffon
- (Spain) Alejandro Moro Cañas
- (Spain) Nikolás Sánchez Izquierdo

The following players received entry from the qualifying draw:

- (Italy) Franco Agamenone
- (Lithuania) Edas Butvilas
- (Germany) Diego Dedura
- (Bosnia and Herzegovina) Andrej Nedić
- (Spain) Oriol Roca Batalla
- (Switzerland) Dominic Stricker

The following players received entry as lucky losers:

- (France) Calvin Hemery
- (Jordan) Abdullah Shelbayh

== Champions ==
=== Singles ===
- (Hungary) Zsombor Piros def. (Austria) Jurij Rodionov 7–5, 6–2.

=== Doubles ===
- (Czech Republic) Andrew Paulson / (Czech Republic) Michael Vrbenský def. (United States) George Goldhoff / (United States) Trey Hilderbrand 2–6, 6–4, [10–8].
