= 2022 Open Comunidad de Madrid =

- Date: 11–17 April
- Edition: 1st
- Surface: Clay
- Location: Madrid, Spain

Champions

Singles
- (Argentina) Pedro Cachin

Doubles
- (Czech Republic) Adam Pavlásek / (Slovakia) Igor Zelenay
- Open Comunidad de Madrid

The 2022 Open Comunidad de Madrid was a professional tennis tournament played on clay courts. It was the 1st edition of the tournament which was part of the 2022 ATP Challenger Tour. It took place in Madrid, Spain between 11 and 17 April 2022.

== Singles main-draw entrants ==
=== Seeds ===
| Country | Player | Rank^{1} | Seed |
|---|---|---|---|
| ESP | Roberto Carballés Baena | 79 | 1 |
| BRA | Thiago Monteiro | 116 | 2 |
| ~~ESP~~ | ~~Feliciano López~~ | ~~118~~ | ~~3~~ |
| ESP | Fernando Verdasco | 120 | 4 |
| GER | Mats Moraing | 125 | 5 |
| FRA | Lucas Pouille | 135 | 6 |
| ~~TPE~~ | ~~Tseng Chun-hsin~~ | ~~140~~ | ~~7~~ |
| SRB | Nikola Milojević | 141 | 8 |
| AUS | Christopher O'Connell | 153 | 9 |

- ^{1} Rankings are as of 4 April 2022.

=== Other entrants ===
The following players received wildcards into the singles main draw:

- (Spain) Roberto Carballés Baena
- (Spain) Miguel Damas
- (France) Lucas Pouille

The following player received entry into the singles main draw using a protected ranking:

- (Austria) Sebastian Ofner

The following players received entry into the singles main draw as alternates:

- (Croatia) Duje Ajduković
- (France) Mathias Bourgue

The following players received entry from the qualifying draw:

- (Italy) Raúl Brancaccio
- (Ukraine) Oleksii Krutykh
- (Switzerland) Johan Nikles
- (Israel) Yshai Oliel
- (Spain) Oriol Roca Batalla
- (Portugal) Pedro Sousa

The following player received entry as a lucky loser:

- (Spain) Javier Barranco Cosano

== Champions ==
=== Singles ===
- (Argentina) Pedro Cachin def. (Argentina) Marco Trungelliti 6–3, 6–7^{(3–7)}, 6–3.

=== Doubles ===
- (Czech Republic) Adam Pavlásek / (Slovakia) Igor Zelenay def. (Brazil) Rafael Matos / (Spain) David Vega Hernández 6–3, 3–6, [10–6].
