= 2025 Open Comunidad de Madrid =

- Date: 7–13 April
- Edition: 4th
- Surface: Clay
- Location: Madrid, Spain

Champions

Singles
- (Poland) Kamil Majchrzak

Doubles
- (Portugal) Francisco Cabral / (Austria) Lucas Miedler
- Open Comunidad de Madrid

The 2025 Open Comunidad de Madrid, known as Grand Prix Open Comunidad de Madrid by Mercedes-Benz Star, was a professional tennis tournament played on clay courts. It was the fourth edition of the tournament which was part of the 2025 ATP Challenger Tour. It took place in Madrid, Spain between 7 and 13 April 2025.

== Singles main-draw entrants ==
=== Seeds ===
Country	Player	Rank^{1}	Seed
CRO	Borna Ćorić	96	1
BOL	Hugo Dellien	102	2
GBR	Billy Harris	103	3
KAZ	Alexander Shevchenko	105	4
	Pavel Kotov	107	5
ESP	Pablo Carreño Busta	110	6
FRA	Valentin Royer	116	7
CRO	Marin Čilić	118	8

- ^{1} Rankings are as of 31 March 2025.

=== Other entrants ===
The following players received wildcards into the singles main draw:

- (Spain) Pablo Carreño Busta
- (Spain) Miguel Damas
- (Spain) Daniel Mérida

The following player received entry into the singles main draw as a special exempt:

- (Spain) ~~Pol Martín Tiffon~~

The following players received entry into the singles main draw as alternates:

- (Peru) Ignacio Buse
- (Spain) Daniel Rincón

The following players received entry from the qualifying draw:

- (Italy) Lorenzo Giustino
- (Slovakia) Norbert Gombos
- (Switzerland) Jakub Paul
- (Hungary) Zsombor Piros
- (Spain) Oriol Roca Batalla
- (Spain) Bernabé Zapata Miralles

The following player received entry as a lucky loser:

- (Dominican Republic) Nick Hardt

== Champions ==
=== Singles ===
- (Poland) Kamil Majchrzak def. (Croatia) Marin Čilić 6–3, 4–6, 6–4.

=== Doubles ===
- (Portugal) Francisco Cabral / (Austria) Lucas Miedler def. (Switzerland) Jakub Paul / (Netherlands) David Pel 7–6^{(7–2)}, 6–4.
