= 2023 Open Comunidad de Madrid =

- Date: 10–16 April
- Edition: 2nd
- Surface: Clay
- Location: Madrid, Spain

Champions

Singles
- Alexander Shevchenko

Doubles
- Ivan Liutarevich / (Ukraine) Vladyslav Manafov
- Open Comunidad de Madrid

The 2023 Open Comunidad de Madrid was a professional tennis tournament played on clay courts. It was the 2nd edition of the tournament which was part of the 2023 ATP Challenger Tour. It took place in Madrid, Spain between 10 and 16 April 2023.

== Singles main-draw entrants ==
=== Seeds ===
Country	Player	Rank^{1}	Seed
ARG	Pedro Cachin	67	1
	Alexander Shevchenko	103	2
ITA	Francesco Passaro	115	3
CRO	Borna Gojo	117	4
AUT	Sebastian Ofner	122	5
FRA	Hugo Grenier	129	6
ITA	Raúl Brancaccio	135	7
SVK	Jozef Kovalík	143	8

- ^{1} Rankings are as of 3 April 2023.

=== Other entrants ===
The following players received wildcards into the singles main draw:

- (Spain) Miguel Damas
- (Spain) Martín Landaluce
- (Spain) Alejandro Moro Cañas

The following players received entry into the singles main draw as alternates:

- (France) Titouan Droguet
- (Australia) Omar Jasika

The following players received entry from the qualifying draw:

- (Norway) Viktor Durasovic
- (United Kingdom) Billy Harris
- (Spain) Javier Martí
- (Spain) Daniel Rincón
- (Spain) Nikolás Sánchez Izquierdo
- Alexey Vatutin

The following players received entry as lucky losers:

- (Spain) Sergi Pérez Contri
- (Australia) Akira Santillan
- (Germany) Henri Squire

== Champions ==
=== Singles ===
- Alexander Shevchenko def. (Argentina) Pedro Cachin 6–4, 6–3.

=== Doubles ===
- Ivan Liutarevich / (Ukraine) Vladyslav Manafov def. (Finland) Patrik Niklas-Salminen / (Netherlands) Bart Stevens 6–4, 6–4.
