= André Göransson =

Swedish tennis player (born 1994)

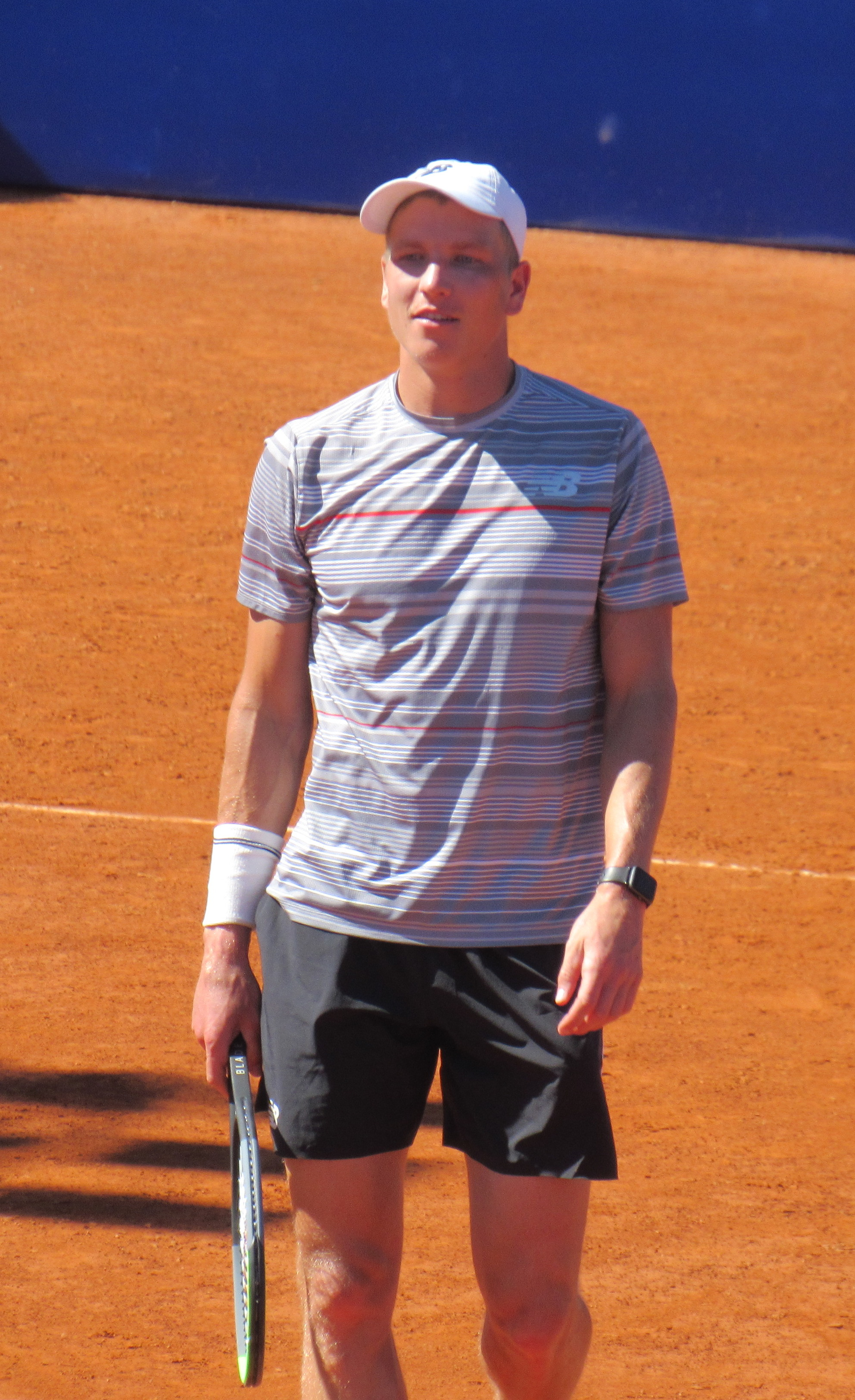
- Göransson in January 2022
- Country (sports): Sweden
- Born: 30 April 1994 (age 32) Räng, Sweden
- Height: 1.88 m (6 ft 2 in)
- Turned pro: 2018
- Plays: Right-handed (two-handed backhand)
- College: California
- Coach: Scott Kintz
- Prize money: US $1,336,265

Singles
- Career record: 0-0
- Career titles: 0
- Highest ranking: No. 773 (25 September 2017)

Doubles
- Career record: 106-125
- Career titles: 3
- Highest ranking: No. 20 (27 October 2025)
- Current ranking: No. 33 (29 June 2026)

Grand Slam doubles results
- Australian Open: SF (2025)
- French Open: 3R (2026)
- Wimbledon: QF (2021)
- US Open: 2R (2022, 2023, 2024)

Grand Slam mixed doubles results
- Australian Open: 1R (2026)
- French Open: QF (2026)
- Wimbledon: 1R (2025, 2026)
- Last updated on: 2 July 2026.

André Göransson (born 30 April 1994) is a Swedish professional tennis player who specializes in doubles. He has a career-high ATP doubles ranking of world No. 20, achieved on 27 October 2025. He is the current No. 1 Swedish doubles player. Göransson has won three ATP Tour doubles titles as well as fourteen ATP Challenger titles and two Futures titles. In singles his career-high is No. 773, achieved on 25 September 2017.

== College career ==
Göransson played college tennis at the University of California, Berkeley.

== Professional career ==
=== 2020-2021: First ATP title & top 100, Major quarterfinal ===
He won his first ATP doubles title at the 2020 Maharashtra Open partnering Christopher Rungkat. He reached the top 100, at world No. 81, on 10 February 2020.

At the 2021 Wimbledon Championships Göransson and his partner Casper Ruud made the quarterfinals of the men's doubles tournament.

At the ATP 250 tournament 2021 Stockholm Open, he reached the quarterfinals with Swedish compatriot Robert Lindstedt. He reached a career-high ranking of World No. 64 on 8 November 2021.

=== 2022-2024: Second ATP title ===
He reached his third ATP final at the 2022 Chile Open with American Nathaniel Lammons.

He reached the final at the 2022 Estoril Open with Argentine Máximo González after defeating fourth seeds Raven Klaasen/ Ben McLachlan.

He won his second ATP title with Sem Verbeek at the 2024 Hall of Fame Open.

=== 2025: Grand Slam semifinal, top 20 ===
At the 2025 Australian Open, he reached the quarterfinals for the first time at the tournament with Verbeek, defeating local wildcards Li Tu and Luke Saville, who played his last match before retirement. Next Verbeek and Göransson upset top pair Marcelo Arevalo and Mate Pavic to reach the semifinals of a Grand Slam for the first time in their careers.

== Performance timeline ==
Key
W	F	SF	QF	#R	RR	Q#	DNQ	A	NH

(W) winner; (F) finalist; (SF) semifinalist; (QF) quarterfinalist; (#R) rounds 4, 3, 2, 1; (RR) round-robin stage; (Q#) qualification round; (DNQ) did not qualify; (A) absent; (NH) not held; (SR) strike rate (events won / competed); (W–L) win–loss record.

=== Doubles ===
Tournament	2021	2022	2023	2024	2025	2026	SR	W–L	Win %
Grand Slams
Australian Open	A	R1	R2	R2	SF	R3	0 / 5	7–5	56%
French Open	A	R1	R1	R1	R2	TBD	0 / 4	2–4	33%
Wimbledon	QF	R1	R1	A	R1		0 / 4	3–4	43%
US Open	R1	R2	R2	R2	R1		0 / 5	3–5	38%
Win–loss	3–2	1–4	2–4	2–3	5–4		0 / 18	15–18	45%
ATP Masters 1000
Indian Wells Masters	A	A	A	A	QF	SF	0 / 2	5–2	67%
Miami Open	A	A	A	A	R1	R1	0 / 2	0–2	0%
Monte Carlo Masters	A	A	A	A	A	R2	0 / 1	1–1	50%
Madrid Open	A	A	A	A	R2	QF	0 / 2	3–2	60%
Italian Open	A	A	A	A	R2	R2	0 / 2	2–2	50%
Canadian Open	A	A	A	A	R2		0 / 1	1–1	50%
Cincinnati Masters	A	A	A	A	R1		0 / 1	0–1	0%
Shanghai Masters	NH		A	A	F		0 / 1	3–1	75%
Paris Masters	A	A	A	A	R1		0 / 1	0–1	0%
Win–loss	0–0	0–0	0–0	0–0	8–8		0 / 13	15–13	54%

== Masters 1000 final ==
=== Doubles: 1 (1 runner-up) ===
Result	Year	Tournament	Surface	Partner	Opponents	Score
Loss	2025	Shanghai Masters	Hard	(United States) Alex Michelsen	(Germany) Kevin Krawietz (Germany) Tim Pütz	4–6, 4–6

== ATP Tour finals ==
=== Doubles: 10 (3 titles, 7 runner-ups) ===
Legend Grand Slam (0–0) ATP 1000 (0–1) ATP 500 (1–0) ATP 250 (2–6)	Finals by surface Hard (1–3) Clay (1–3) Grass (1–1)	Finals by setting Outdoor (3–7) Indoor (0–0)

Result	W–L	Date	Tournament	Tier	Surface	Partner	Opponents	Score
Win	1–0	Feb 2020	Maharashtra Open, India	ATP 250	Hard	(Indonesia) Christopher Rungkat	(Israel) Jonathan Erlich (Belarus) Andrei Vasilevski	6–2, 3–6, [10–8]
Loss	1–1	May 2021	Belgrade Open, Serbia	ATP 250	Clay	(Brazil) Rafael Matos	(Israel) Jonathan Erlich (Belarus) Andrei Vasilevski	4–6, 1–6
Loss	1–2	Feb 2022	Chile Open, Chile	ATP 250	Clay	(United States) Nathaniel Lammons	(Brazil) Felipe Meligeni Alves (Brazil) Rafael Matos	6–7^{(8–10)}, 6–7^{(3–7)}
Loss	1–3	Apr 2022	Estoril Open, Portugal	ATP 250	Clay	(Argentina) Máximo González	(Portugal) Nuno Borges (Portugal) Francisco Cabral	2–6, 3–6
Win	2–3	Jul 2024	Hall of Fame Open, United States	ATP 250	Grass	(Netherlands) Sem Verbeek	(United States) Robert Cash (United States) JJ Tracy	6–3, 6–4
Loss	2–4	Jul 2024	Atlanta Open, United States	ATP 250	Hard	(Netherlands) Sem Verbeek	(United States) Nathaniel Lammons (United States) Jackson Withrow	6–4, 4–6, [10–12]
Win	3–4	Apr 2025	Bavarian Championships, Germany	ATP 500	Clay	(Netherlands) Sem Verbeek	(Germany) Kevin Krawietz (Germany) Tim Pütz	6–4, 6–4
Loss	3–5	Oct 2025	Shanghai Masters, China	ATP 1000	Hard	(United States) Alex Michelsen	(Germany) Kevin Krawietz (Germany) Tim Pütz	4–6, 4–6
Loss	3–6	Jun 2026	Mallorca Championships, Spain	ATP 250	Grass	(United States) Evan King	(France) Théo Arribagé (France) Albano Olivetti	6–7^{(6–8)}, 6–3, [9–11]
Loss	3–7	Sep 2026	Chengdu Open, China	ATP 250	Hard	(United States) Robert Galloway	(United Kingdom) Luke Johnson (Poland) Jan Zieliński	5–7, 6–7^{(7–9)}

== Challenger and Futures finals ==
=== Singles: 1 (0–1) ===
Legend (singles) ATP Challenger Tour (0–0) ITF Futures Tour (0–1)	Finals by surface Hard (0–1) Clay (0–0) Grass (0–0)

Result	W–L	Date	Tournament	Tier	Surface	Opponent	Score
Loss	0–1	Oct 2016	USA F33, Berkeley	Futures	Hard	(United States) Marcos Giron	7–5, 6–7^{(5–7)}, 4–6

=== Doubles: 32 (16 titles, 18 runners-up) ===
Legend (doubles) ATP Challenger Tour (14–14) ITF Futures Tour (2–4)	Titles by surface Hard (13–8) Clay (3–10) Grass (0–0)

Result	W–L	Date	Tournament	Tier	Surface	Partner	Opponents	Score
Loss	0–1	Oct 2016	USA F33, Berkeley	Futures	Hard	(Netherlands) Sem Verbeek	(United States) Connor Smith (United States) Rhyne Williams	4–6, 3–6
Loss	0–2	Jun 2017	Poland F2, Gdynia	Futures	Clay	(Norway) Fredrik Ask	(Bolivia) Boris Arias (United States) Nick Chappell	1–6, 1–6
Win	1–2	Oct 2017	Tiburon, USA	Challenger	Hard	(France) Florian Lakat	(El Salvador) Marcelo Arévalo (Mexico) Miguel Ángel Reyes-Varela	6–4, 6–4
Win	2–2	Mar 2018	USA F8, Calabasas	Futures	Hard	(France) Florian Lakat	(Portugal) Bernardo Saraiva (Netherlands) Sem Verbeek	6–2, 7–6^{(7–3)}
Win	3–2	Apr 2018	USA F9, Memphis	Futures	Hard	(France) Florian Lakat	(Netherlands) Scott Griekspoor (Belgium) Yannick Mertens	2–6, 6–2, [10–7]
Loss	3–3	Jun 2018	Spain F14, Huelva	Futures	Clay	(Sweden) Fred Simonsson	(Spain) Javier Barranco Cosano (Italy) Raúl Brancaccio	7–5, 6–7^{(10–12)}, [5–10]
Loss	3–4	Jun 2018	Hungary F4, Gyula	Futures	Clay	(Sweden) Fred Simonsson	(Australia) Dane Propoggia (Australia) Scott Puodziunas	4–6, 1–6
Win	4–4	Jul 2018	Tampere, Finland	Challenger	Clay	(Sweden) Markus Eriksson	(Russia) Ivan Gakhov (Russia) Alexander Pavlioutchenkov	6–3, 3–6, [10–7]
Loss	4–5	Jan 2019	Nouméa, New Caledonia	Challenger	Hard	(Netherlands) Sem Verbeek	(Germany) Dustin Brown (United States) Donald Young	5–7, 4–6
Loss	4–6	Jan 2019	Canberra, Australia	Challenger	Hard	(Netherlands) Sem Verbeek	(Brazil) Marcelo Demoliner (France) Hugo Nys	6–3, 4–6, [3–10]
Win	5–6	Feb 2019	Cuernavaca, Mexico	Challenger	Hard	(Switzerland) Marc-Andrea Hüsler	(Ecuador) Gonzalo Escobar (Venezuela) Luis David Martínez	6–3, 3–6, [11–9]
Loss	5–7	Jun 2019	Shymkent, Uzbekistan	Challenger	Clay	(Switzerland) Marc-Andrea Hüsler	(Serbia) Nikola Čačić (Chinese Taipei) Yang Tsung-hua	4–6, 4–6
Win	6–7	Jul 2019	Granby, Canada	Challenger	Hard	(Netherlands) Sem Verbeek	(China) Li Zhe (Monaco) Hugo Nys	6–2, 6–4
Win	7–7	Sep 2019	Cassis, France	Challenger	Hard	(Netherlands) Sem Verbeek	(Netherlands) Sander Arends (Netherlands) David Pel	7–6^{(8–6)}, 4–6, [11–9]
Loss	7–8	Oct 2019	Fairfield, USA	Challenger	Hard	(Netherlands) Sem Verbeek	(Canada) Peter Polansky (Barbados) Darian King	4–6, 6–3, [10–12]
Loss	7–9	Nov 2019	Kobe, Japan	Challenger	Hard (i)	(Indonesia) Christopher Rungkat	(India) Purav Raja (India) Ramkumar Ramanathan	6–7^{(6–8)}, 3–6
Loss	7–10	Aug 2020	Prague, Czech Republic	Challenger	Clay	(Portugal) Gonçalo Oliveira	(Netherlands) Sander Arends (Netherlands) David Pel	5–7, 6–7^{(5–7)},
Loss	7–11	Oct 2020	Split, Croatia	Challenger	Clay	(United States) Hunter Reese	(Philippines) Treat Huey (United States) Nathaniel Lammons	4–6, 6–7^{(3–7)}
Win	8–11	Jan 2021	Istanbul, Turkey	Challenger	Hard (i)	(Netherlands) David Pel	(United Kingdom) Lloyd Glasspool (Finland) Harri Heliövaara	4–6, 6–3, [10–8]
Win	9–11	May 2021	Biella, Italy	Challenger	Clay	(United States) Nathaniel Lammons	(Brazil) Rafael Matos (Brazil) Felipe Meligeni Alves	7–6^{(7–3)}, 6–3
Loss	9–12	May 2021	Heilbronn, Germany	Challenger	Clay	(Netherlands) Sem Verbeek	(United States) Nathaniel Lammons (United States) Jackson Withrow	7–6^{(7–4)}, 4–6, [8–10]
Loss	9–13	Sep 2021	Szczecin, Poland	Challenger	Clay	(United States) Nathaniel Lammons	(Mexico) Santiago González (Argentina) Andrés Molteni	6–2, 2–6, [13–15]
Loss	9–14	Apr 2022	Sarasota, USA	Challenger	Clay	(United States) Nathaniel Lammons	(United States) Robert Galloway (United States) Jackson Withrow	3–6, 6–7^{(3–7)}
Win	10–14	Aug 2022	Chicago, United States	Challenger	Hard	(Japan) Ben McLachlan	(United States) Evan King (United States) Mitchell Krueger	6–4, 6–7^{(3–7)}, [10–5]
Win	11–14	Aug 2022	Vancouver, Canada	Challenger	Hard	(Japan) Ben McLachlan	(Philippines) Treat Huey (Australia) John-Patrick Smith	6–7^{(4–7)}, 7–6^{(9–7)}, [11–9]
Win	12–14	Jan 2023	Canberra, Australia	Challenger	Hard	(Japan) Ben McLachlan	(Australia) Andrew Harris (Australia) John-Patrick Smith	6–3, 5–7, [10–5]
Win	13–14	Feb 2023	Monterrey, Mexico	Challenger	Hard	(Japan) Ben McLachlan	(Venezuela) Luis David Martínez (Colombia) Cristian Rodríguez	6–3, 6–4
Loss	13–15	Mar 2023	Puerto Vallarta, Mexico	Challenger	Hard	(Japan) Ben McLachlan	(United States) Robert Galloway (Mexico) Miguel Ángel Reyes-Varela	0–3, retired
Win	14–15	Nov 2023	Drummondville, Canada	Challenger	Hard (i)	(United Kingdom) Toby Samuel	(Canada) Liam Draxl (United Kingdom) Giles Hussey	6–7^{(2–7)}, 6–3, [10–8]
Win	15–15	Nov 2023	Brasilia, Brazil	ATP Challenger	Clay	(Colombia) Nicolas Barrientos	(Brazil) Marcelo Demoliner (Brazil) Rafael Matos	7–6^{(7–3)}, 4–6, [11–9]
Loss	15–16	Mar 2024	Szekesfehevar, Hungary	Challenger	Clay	(Ukraine) Denys Molchanov	(France) Matteo Martineau (France) Titouan Droguet	6–4, 5–7, [8–10]
Win	16–16	Aug 2024	Lexington, USA	Challenger	Hard	(Netherlands) Sem Verbeek	(Japan) Y Shimizu (Japan) J Trotter	6–4, 6–3
Loss	16–17	Sep 2024	Saint-Tropez, France	Challenger	Hard	(Netherlands) Sem Verbeek	(United Kingdom) Luke Johnson (Netherlands) Sander Arends	6–3, 3–6, [4–10]
Loss	16–18	Nov 2024	Bratislava, Slovakia	Challenger	Hard (i)	(Netherlands) Sem Verbeek	(Colombia) Nicolás Barrientos (United Kingdom) Julian Cash	3–6, 4–6
