= 2021 Pekao Szczecin Open =

- Date: 13–19 September
- Edition: 28th
- Surface: Clay
- Location: Szczecin, Poland

Champions

Singles
- (Czech Republic) Zdeněk Kolář

Doubles
- (Mexico) Santiago González / (Argentina) Andrés Molteni
- Pekao Szczecin Open

The 2021 Pekao Szczecin Open was a professional tennis tournament played on clay courts. It was the 28th edition of the tournament which was part of the 2021 ATP Challenger Tour. It took place in Szczecin, Poland between 13 and 19 September 2021.

== Singles main-draw entrants ==
=== Seeds ===
Country	Player	Rank^{1}	Seed
ESP	Albert Ramos Viñolas	48	1
ESP	Pablo Andújar	74	2
~~ESP~~	~~Pedro Martínez~~	~~75~~	~~3~~
ITA	Marco Cecchinato	81	4
CZE	Jiří Veselý	90	5
BRA	Thiago Monteiro	93	6
ESP	Roberto Carballés Baena	95	7
ITA	Stefano Travaglia	100	8

^{1} Rankings are as of 30 August 2021.

=== Other entrants ===
The following players received wildcards into the singles main draw:

- (Poland) Paweł Ciaś
- (Poland) Daniel Michalski
- (Spain) Albert Ramos Viñolas

The following player received entry into the singles main draw as an alternate:

- (Italy) Andrea Pellegrino

The following players received entry from the qualifying draw:

- (Spain) Nicola Kuhn
- (United States) Alex Rybakov
- (Ukraine) Vitaliy Sachko
- (Russia) Alexey Vatutin

The following players received entry as lucky losers:

- (Netherlands) Jesper de Jong
- (France) Matteo Martineau

== Champions ==
=== Singles ===
- (Czech Republic) Zdeněk Kolář def. (Poland) Kamil Majchrzak 7–6^{(7–4)}, 7–5.

=== Doubles ===
- (Mexico) Santiago González / (Argentina) Andrés Molteni def. (Sweden) André Göransson / (United States) Nathaniel Lammons 2–6, 6–2, [15–13].
