= 2021 Pekao Szczecin Open – Doubles =

Doubles
- 2021 Pekao Szczecin Open

Final
- Champions: (Mexico) Santiago González (Argentina) Andrés Molteni
- Runners-up: (Sweden) André Göransson (United States) Nathaniel Lammons
- Score: 2–6, 6–2, [15–13]

Events
| Singles | Doubles |
- Pekao Szczecin Open

Guido Andreozzi and Andrés Molteni were the defending champions but only Molteni chose to defend his title, partnering Santiago González. Molteni successfully defended his title.

González and Molteni won the title after defeating André Göransson and Nathaniel Lammons 2–6, 6–2, [15–13] in the final.

== Seeds ==
1. (Mexico) Santiago González / (Argentina) Andrés Molteni (champions)
2. (Sweden) André Göransson / (United States) Nathaniel Lammons (final)
3. (Croatia) Ivan Sabanov / (Croatia) Matej Sabanov (semifinals)
4. (Czech Republic) Roman Jebavý / (Czech Republic) Zdeněk Kolář (semifinals)

== Draw ==
Key

- Q = Qualifier
- WC = Wild card
- LL = Lucky loser
- Alt = Alternate
- ITF = ITF entry
- PR = Protected ranking
- SR = Special ranking
- SE = Special exempt
- JE = Junior exempt
- JR = Junior Accelerator Programme entrant
- CO = College Accelerator Programme entrant
- NG = Next Gen Accelerator Program entrant
- w/o = Walkover
- r = Retired
- d = Defaulted

First round
1 | (Mexico) S González (Argentina) A Molteni | 7 | 6
(Monaco) R Arneodo (Philippines) T Huey | 5 | 4
WC | (Ukraine) V Manafov (Poland) P Matuszewski | 6 | 3 | [6]
(France) S Doumbia (France) F Reboul | 4 | 6 | [10]
4 | (Czech Republic) R Jebavý (Czech Republic) Z Kolář | 7^{7} | 6
(Ukraine) D Molchanov (Brazil) F Romboli | 6^{5} | 4
(United States) H Reese (Netherlands) S Verbeek | 6 | 6
WC | (Poland) K Drzewiecki (Spain) S Martos Gornés | 4 | 4
Alt | (Netherlands) J de Jong (Ukraine) V Sachko | 3 | 6 | [10]
(Japan) T Daniel (Brazil) T Monteiro | 6 | 2 | [7]
Alt | (Italy) A Pellegrino (Italy) S Travaglia | 2 | 2
3 | (Croatia) I Sabanov (Croatia) M Sabanov | 6 | 6
(Switzerland) L Margaroli (Spain) D Vega Hernández | 3 | 4
(Poland) S Walków (Poland) J Zieliński | 6 | 6
WC | (Germany) D Brown (Syria) H Naw | 1 | 5
2 | (Sweden) A Göransson (United States) N Lammons | 6 | 7

Quarterfinals
1 | (Mexico) S González (Argentina) A Molteni | 3 | 6 | [10]
(France) S Doumbia (France) F Reboul | 6 | 4 | [5]
4 | (Czech Republic) R Jebavý (Czech Republic) Z Kolář | 6 | 6
(United States) H Reese (Netherlands) S Verbeek | 4 | 3
Alt | (Netherlands) J de Jong (Ukraine) V Sachko | 3 | 6^{4}
3 | (Croatia) I Sabanov (Croatia) M Sabanov | 6 | 7^{7}
(Poland) S Walków (Poland) J Zieliński | 7^{7} | 3 | [0]
2 | (Sweden) A Göransson (United States) N Lammons | 6^{4} | 6 | [10]

Semifinals
1 | (Mexico) S González (Argentina) A Molteni | 6 | 7
4 | (Czech Republic) R Jebavý (Czech Republic) Z Kolář | 2 | 5
3 | (Croatia) I Sabanov (Croatia) M Sabanov | 5 | 2
2 | (Sweden) A Göransson (United States) N Lammons | 7 | 6

Final
1 | (Mexico) S González (Argentina) A Molteni | 2 | 6 | [15]
2 | (Sweden) A Göransson (United States) N Lammons | 6 | 2 | [13]
