= Stefano Napolitano =

Italian tennis player

- Napolitano at the 2026 Wimbledon Championships
- Country (sports): Italy
- Residence: Pollone, Italy
- Born: 11 April 1995 (age 31) Biella, Italy
- Height: 1.96 m (6 ft 5 in)
- Turned pro: 2012
- Plays: Right-handed (two-handed backhand)
- Coach: Cristian Brandi
- Prize money: US $1,249,121

Singles
- Career record: 3–7
- Career titles: 0
- Highest ranking: No. 121 (17 June 2024)
- Current ranking: No. 284 (5 October 2026)

Grand Slam singles results
- Australian Open: Q3 (2024)
- French Open: 2R (2017)
- Wimbledon: Q3 (2018)
- US Open: Q2 (2019, 2024)

Doubles
- Career record: 1–4
- Career titles: 0
- Highest ranking: No. 182 (3 April 2017)
- Current ranking: No. 862 (5 October 2026)
- Last updated on: 15 October 2026.

Stefano Napolitano (Italian pronunciation: [ˈsteːfano napoliˈtaːno, ˈstɛː-]; born 11 April 1995) is an Italian professional tennis player playing on the ATP Challenger Tour. He reached his highest ATP singles ranking of world No. 121 on 17 June 2024 and a doubles ranking of No. 182, achieved on 3 April 2017.

== Career ==
=== 2015–2017: Major debut and first win, Masters debut ===
Napolitano defeated Augusto Virgili in the qualifying of the 2015 Distal & ITR Group Tennis Cup 6–0, 6–3, winning the first set without dropping a single point, which is referred to as a golden set.

He made his Masters debut at the 2017 Italian Open as a wildcard.

He also made his Grand Slam debut at the 2017 French Open after qualifying and recorded his first win over 31st seed Mischa Zverev.

=== 2023–2025: Top 125, first Masters wins, hiatus ===
Ranked No. 555, he entered the main draw of the 2023 Italian Open after qualifying, six years since his Masters debut at the same tournament in 2017, having received a wildcard for the qualifying competition.

He also qualified for the 2023 Rolex Shanghai Masters after Marc Polmans was disqualified in the last round of qualifications for hitting a ball at the umpire in frustration.

Following his third Challenger title at the 2024 Open Comunidad de Madrid, he reached the top 125 on 15 April 2024.

He received a wildcard for the 2024 Italian Open and reached the third round defeating two lucky losers JJ Wolf and Juncheng Shang, recording his first Masters wins.

In September 2025, as a wildcard, Napolitano won the 2025 Città di Biella Challenger.

== ATP Challenger and ITF Tour finals ==
=== Singles: 21 (7–14) ===
Legend (singles) ATP Challenger Tour (4–7) ITF Futures/World Tennis Tour (3–7)	Finals by surface Hard (4–6) Clay (3–7) Carpet (0–1)

Result	W–L	Date	Tournament	Tier	Surface	Opponent	Score
Loss	0–1	Feb 2014	Italy F2, Rovereto	Futures	Carpet (i)	(Italy) Luca Vanni	3–6, 3–6
Loss	0–2	May 2014	Israel F4, Ashkelon	Futures	Hard	(Germany) Robin Kern	4–6, 1–6
Loss	0–3	May 2014	Tunisia F2, Sousse	Futures	Hard	(Spain) David Pérez Sanz	7–6^{(7–2)}, 3–6, 4–6
Loss	0–4	Aug 2014	Romania F12, Mediaș	Futures	Clay	(Slovakia) Filip Horanský	6–4, 6–7^{(4–7)}, 2–6
Win	1–4	Mar 2015	Israel F2, Herzlia	Futures	Hard	(Czech Republic) Michal Konečný	4–6, 6–4, 6–4
Loss	1–5	Apr 2015	Italy F5, Santa Margherita di Pula	Futures	Clay	(Italy) Federico Gaio	2–6, 4–6
Loss	1–6	Sep 2015	Israel F12, Meitar	Futures	Hard	(Belgium) Michael Geerts	6–7^{(10–12)}, 2–6
Loss	1–7	Jul 2016	Todi, Italy	Challenger	Clay	(Serbia) Miljan Zekić	7–6^{(8–6)}, 4–6, 3–6
Win	2–7	Nov 2016	Ortisei, Italy	Challenger	Hard (i)	(Italy) Alessandro Giannessi	6–4, 6–1
Loss	2–8	Feb 2018	Bergamo, Italy	Challenger	Hard (i)	(Italy) Matteo Berrettini	2–6, 6–3, 2–6
Loss	2–9	Aug 2018	Lexington, USA	Challenger	Hard	(South Africa) Lloyd Harris	4–6, 3–6
Loss	2–10	Sep 2018	Biella, Italy	Challenger	Clay	(Argentina) Federico Delbonis	4–6, 3–6
Loss	2–11	Mar 2019	Shenzhen, China, P.R.	Challenger	Hard	(Cyprus) Marcos Baghdatis	2–6, 6–3, 4–6
Loss	2–12	Jun 2023	M15 Frascati, Italy	World Tour	Clay	(Italy) Julian Ocleppo	4–6, 5–7
Win	3–12	Jul 2023	M25 Biella, Italy	World Tour	Clay	(Italy) Lorenzo Carboni	6–4, 6–0
Win	4–12	Oct 2023	M15 Selva Gardena, Italy	World Tour	Hard	(Germany) Adrian Oetzbach	7–5, 6–4
Win	5–12	Feb 2024	Bangalore, India	Challenger	Hard	(South Korea) Hong Seong-chan	4–6, 6–3, 6–3
Win	6–12	Apr 2024	Madrid, Spain	Challenger	Clay	(Switzerland) Leandro Riedi	6–3, 6–3
Win	7–12	Sep 2025	Biella, Italy	Challenger	Clay	(Switzerland) Kilian Feldbausch	7–5, 6–3
Loss	7–13	Mar 2026	Kigali, Rwanda	Challenger	Clay	(Austria) Joel Schwärzler	6–7^{(5–7)}, 6–7^{(6–8)}
Loss	7–14	Apr 2026	Mexico City, Mexico	Challenger	Clay	(Australia) James Duckworth	7–6^{(9–7)}, 6–7^{(3–7)}, 2–6

=== Doubles: 11 (4–7) ===
Legend (doubles) ATP Challenger Tour (3–3) ITF Futures Tour (1–4)	Finals by surface Hard (0–4) Clay (4–3) Grass (0–0) Carpet (0–0)

Result	W–L	Date	Tournament	Tier	Surface	Partner	Opponents	Score
Loss	0–1	May 2012	Italy F9, Pozzuoli	Futures	Clay	(Italy) Alessio di Mauro	(Italy) Claudio Grassi (Italy) Walter Trusendi	3–6, 2–6
Loss	0–2	Jul 2012	Italy F19, Fano	Futures	Clay	(Italy) Marco Viola	(Italy) Matteo Volante (Serbia) Miljan Zekić	3–6, 6–7^{(3–7)}
Win	1–2	Apr 2014	Italy F10, Santa Margherita di Pula	Futures	Clay	(Italy) Marco Bortolotti	(Italy) Emanuele Molina (Italy) Riccardo Sinicropi	6–4, 6–4
Win	2–2	Apr 2014	Vercelli, Italy	Challenger	Clay	(Italy) Matteo Donati	(France) Pierre-Hugues Herbert (France) Albano Olivetti	7–6^{(7–2)}, 6–3
Loss	2–3	Sep 2015	Israel F12, Meitar	Futures	Hard	(Belgium) Michael Geerts	(Australia) Jarryd Chaplin (New Zealand) Ben McLachlan	6–7^{(5–7)}, 3–6
Loss	2–4	Apr 2016	Napoli, Italy	Challenger	Clay	(Italy) Matteo Donati	(Germany) Gero Kretschmer (Germany) Alexander Satschko	1–6, 3–6
Win	3–4	Jul 2016	San Benedetto, Italy	Challenger	Clay	(Italy) Federico Gaio	(Argentina) Facundo Argüello (Peru) Sergio Galdós	6–3, 6–4
Win	4–4	Oct 2016	Rome, Italy	Challenger	Clay	(Italy) Federico Gaio	(Croatia) Marin Draganja (Croatia) Tomislav Draganja	6–7^{(5–7)}, 6–2, [10–3]
Loss	4–5	Jan 2017	Nouméa, New Caledonia	Challenger	Hard	(Spain) Adrián Menéndez Maceiras	(France) Quentin Halys (France) Tristan Lamasine	6–7^{(9–11)}, 1–6
Loss	4–6	Jan 2021	M15+H Bressuire, France	World Tennis Tour	Hard	(France) Kenny De Schepper	(United States) Roy Smith (United States) Alafia Ayeni	6–7^{(4-7)}, 6-4, [5–10]
Loss	4–7	Mar 2025	Morelia, Mexico	Challenger	Hard	(Switzerland) Marc-Andrea Hüsler	(Ecuador) Gonzalo Escobar (Ecuador) Diego Hidalgo	4–6, 6–4, [3–10]

== Singles performance timeline ==
Key
W	F	SF	QF	#R	RR	Q#	P#	DNQ	A	Z#	PO	G	S	B	NMS	NTI	P	NH

(W) winner; (F) finalist; (SF) semifinalist; (QF) quarterfinalist; (#R) rounds 4, 3, 2, 1; (RR) round-robin stage; (Q#) qualification round; (P#) preliminary round; (DNQ) did not qualify; (A) absent; (Z#) Davis/Fed Cup Zonal Group (with number indication) or (PO) play-off; (G) gold, (S) silver or (B) bronze Olympic/Paralympic medal; (NMS) not a Masters tournament; (NTI) not a Tier I tournament; (P) postponed; (NH) not held; (SR) strike rate (events won / competed); (W–L) win–loss record.
To avoid confusion and double counting, these charts are updated at the conclusion of a tournament or when the player's participation has ended.

Tournament	2015	2016	2017	2018	2019	2020	2021	2022	2023	2024	2025	SR	W–L
Grand Slam tournaments
Australian Open	A	A	Q2	Q2	Q2	Q1	A	A	A	Q3	A	0 / 0	0–0
French Open	A	A	2R	Q2	Q2	Q1	A	A	A	Q2	Q2	0 / 1	1–1
Wimbledon	A	A	Q1	Q3	Q2	NH	A	A	A	Q2	Q1	0 / 0	0–0
US Open	A	Q1	Q1	Q1	Q2	A	A	A	A	Q2	Q1	0 / 0	0–0
Win–loss	0–0	0–0	1–1	0–0	0–0	0–0	0–0	0–0	0–0	0–0	0–0	0 / 1	1–1
ATP World Tour Masters 1000
Indian Wells Masters	A	A	A	A	A	NH	A	A	A	A	A	0 / 0	0–0
Miami Open	A	A	A	A	A	NH	A	A	A	A	Q1	0 / 0	0–0
Monte Carlo Masters	A	A	A	A	A	NH	A	A	A	A	A	0 / 0	0–0
Madrid Open	A	A	A	A	A	NH	A	A	A	Q1	A	0 / 0	0-0
Italian Open	Q2	A	1R	A	A	A	A	A	1R	3R	Q1	0 / 3	2–3
Canadian Open	A	A	A	A	A	NH	A	A	A	A	A	0 / 0	0–0
Cincinnati Masters	A	A	A	A	A	A	A	A	A	A	A	0 / 0	0–0
Shanghai Masters	A	A	A	A	A	NH			1R	A	Q1	0 / 1	0–1
Paris Masters	A	A	A	A	A	A	A	A	A	A	A	0 / 0	0–0
Win–loss	0–0	0–0	0–1	0–0	0–0	0–0	0–0	0–0	0–2	2–1	0–0	0 / 4	2–4

== Junior Grand Slam finals ==
=== Doubles: 1 (1 runner-up) ===
Result	Year	Tournament	Surface	Partner	Opponents	Score
Loss	2013	Wimbledon	Grass	(France) Enzo Couacaud	(Australia) Thanasi Kokkinakis (Australia) Nick Kyrgios	2–6, 2–6
