= Kamil Majchrzak =

Polish tennis player (born 1996)

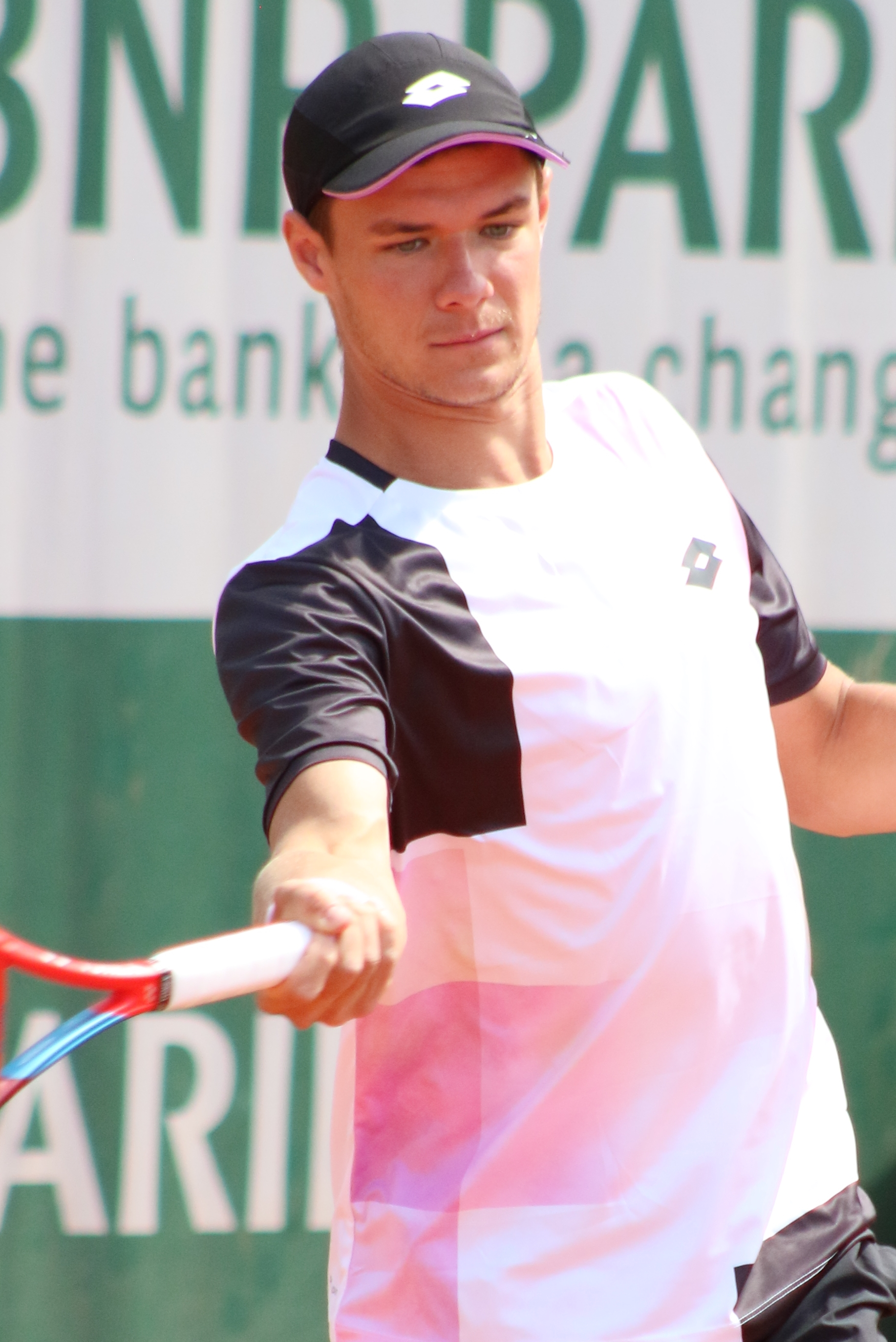
- Majchrzak at the 2021 French Open
- Full name: Kamil Adrian Majchrzak
- Country (sports): Poland
- Residence: Piotrków Trybunalski, Poland
- Born: 13 January 1996 (age 30) Piotrków Trybunalski, Poland
- Height: 1.83 m (6 ft 0 in)
- Turned pro: 2014
- Plays: Right-handed (two-handed backhand)
- Coach: Joakim Nyström (Dec 2020-Aug 2022), Jean-Marcel Bourgault Du Coudray, Christopher Kas
- Prize money: US $4,589,790
- Official website: www.kamilmajchrzak.pl

Singles
- Career record: 58–65
- Career titles: 1
- Highest ranking: No. 45 (29 June 2026)
- Current ranking: No. 82 (9 November 2026)

Grand Slam singles results
- Australian Open: 2R (2022, 2026)
- French Open: 2R (2021)
- Wimbledon: 4R (2025)
- US Open: 3R (2019, 2025)

Other tournaments
- Olympic Games: 1R (2021)

Doubles
- Career record: 2–7
- Career titles: 0
- Highest ranking: No. 241 (8 August 2016)
- Current ranking: No. 893 (29 June 2026)

Grand Slam doubles results
- French Open: 1R (2022)
- Wimbledon: 2R (2022)
Medal record
Men's tennis
Representing Poland
Youth Olympic Games
Gold medal – first place	2014 Nanjing	Singles
European Youth Olympic Festival
Gold medal – first place	2011 Trabzon	Doubles
Representing (International Olympic Committee) Mixed-NOCs
Youth Olympic Games
Bronze medal – third place	2014 Nanjing	Mixed doubles
- Last updated on: 9 August 2026.

Kamil Adrian Majchrzak (Note: [ˈkamil ˈmai̯xʂak]) (born 13 January 1996) is a Polish professional tennis player. He has a career-high ATP singles ranking of world No. 45 achieved on 29 June 2026 and a doubles ranking of No. 241 achieved on 8 August 2016. He is the current No. 2 Polish singles player.

Majchrzak has won one ATP Tour singles title at the 2026 Libéma Open.

== Professional career ==
=== Juniors ===
Partnering with Martin Redlicki, Majchrzak won the 2013 US Open boys' doubles title by defeating Quentin Halys and Frederico Ferreira Silva in the final.

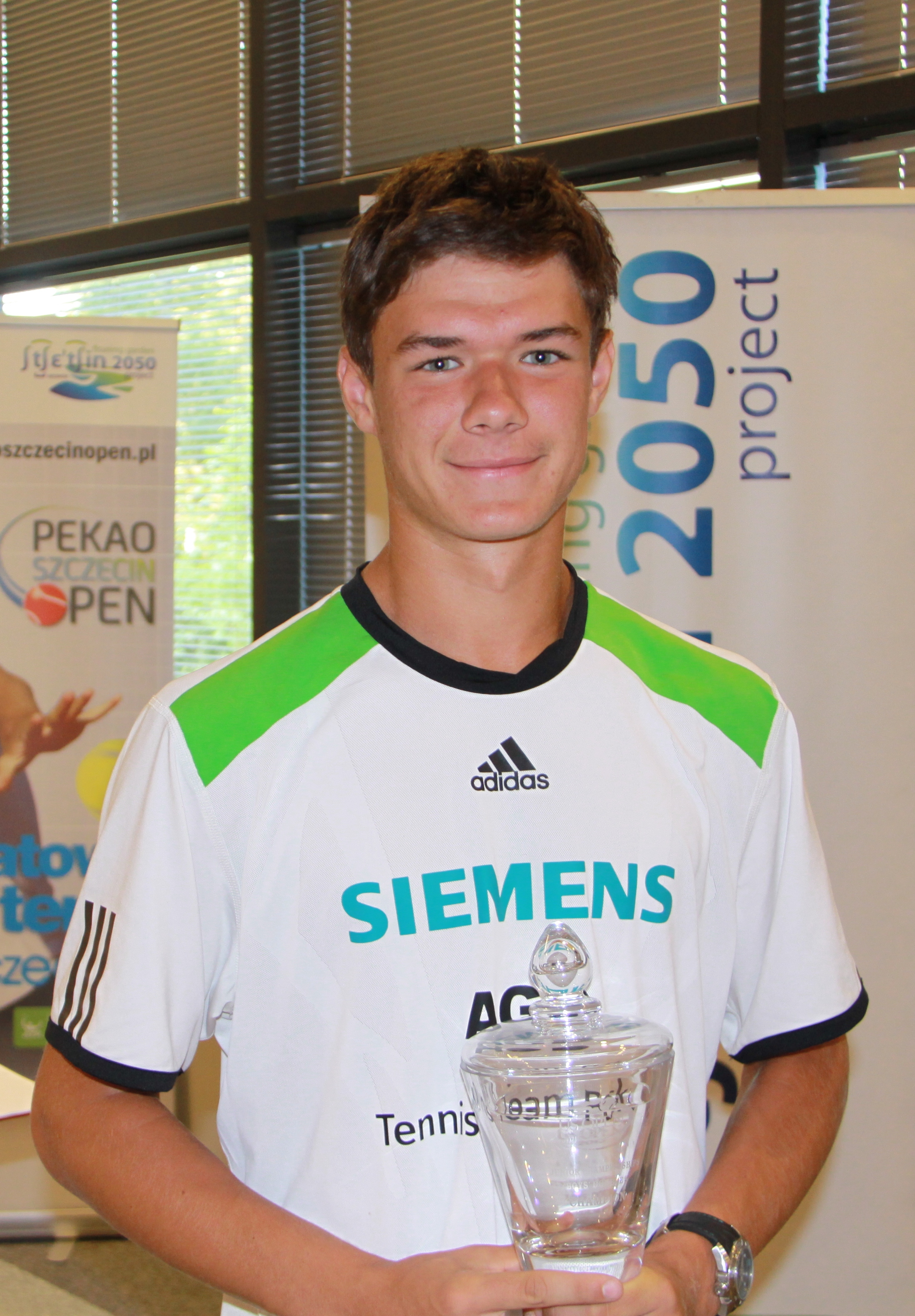
Majchrzak with the junior doubles trophy at the 2013 US Open

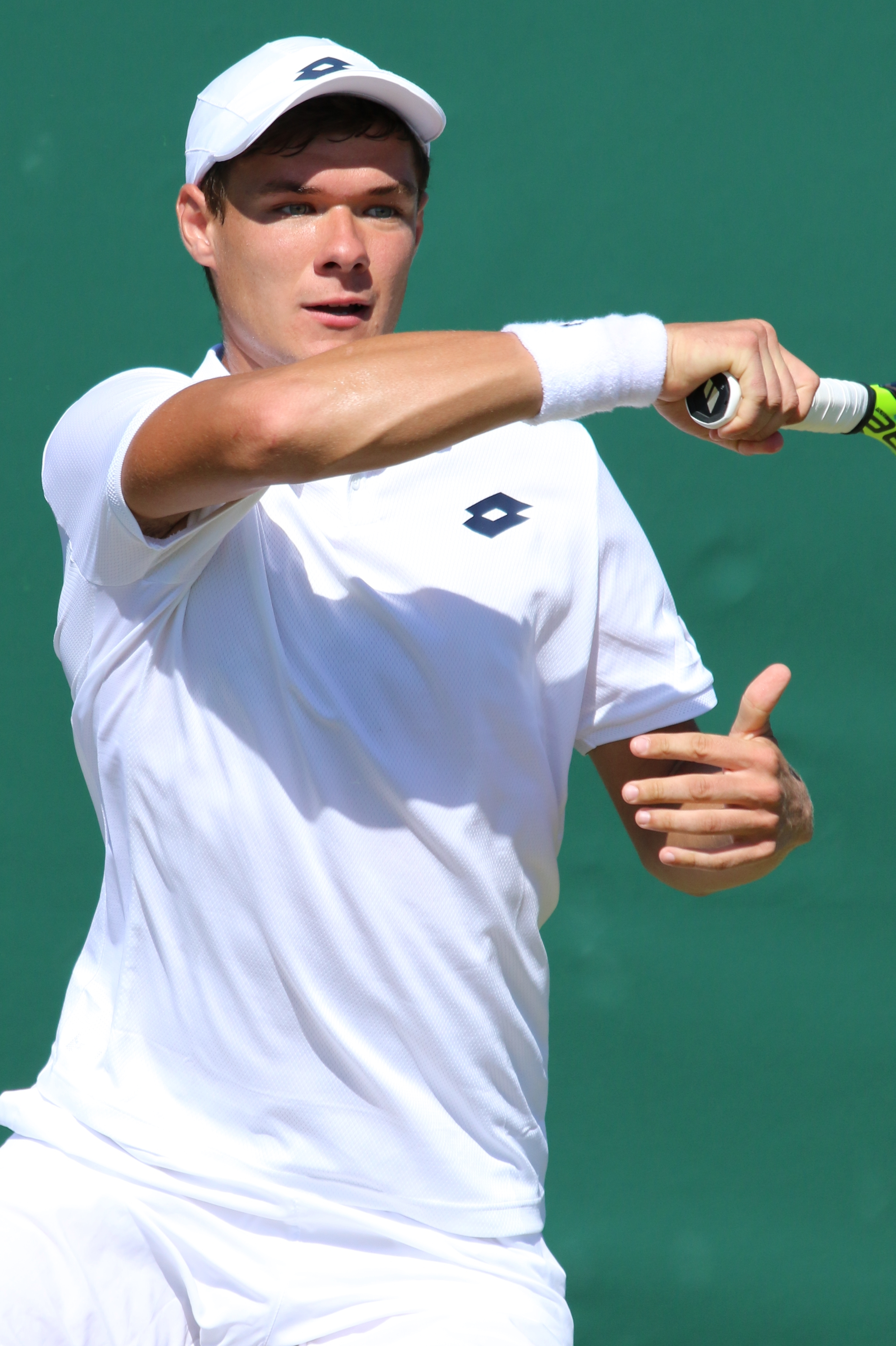
Majchrzak at The Championships, Wimbledon in 2018

=== 2019: Grand Slam debut and first two wins, Top 100 ===
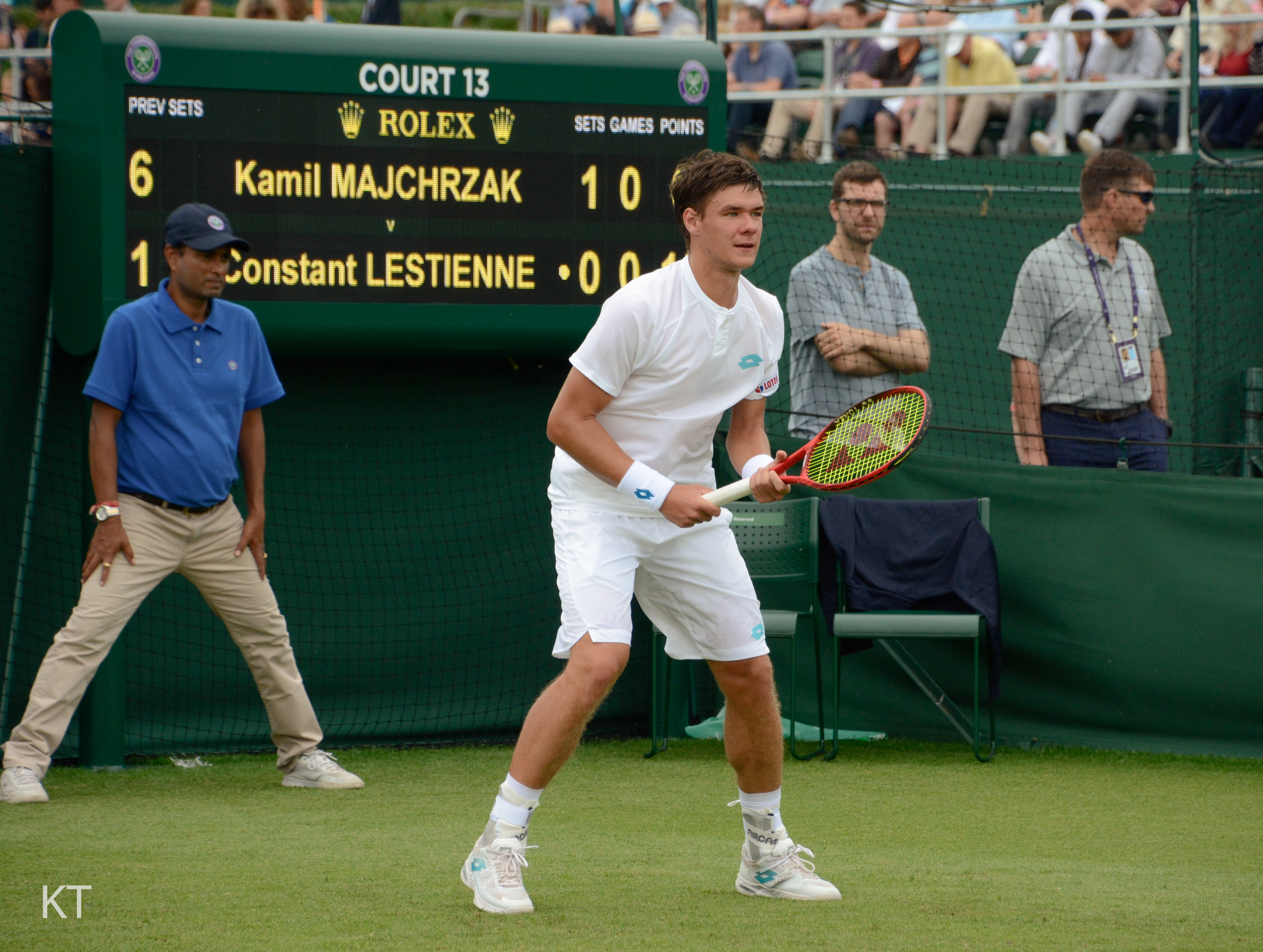
Majchrzak at the 2019 Wimbledon Championships

During the 2019 Australian Open, Majchrzak advanced through the qualifying to reach the 1st round. He won the first two sets against top-10 player Kei Nishikori, but then was forced to retire due to an injury.

In March 2019 Majchrzak celebrated his maiden Challenger triumph at the 2019 Open Harmonie mutuelle in St. Brieuc, France. Two months later he advanced to the 2019 Prosperita Open final with wins over Riccardio Bonadio, Zsombor Piros, No. 5 seeded Dennis Novak, and top seed Lloyd Harris. He defeated future world No. 1 Jannik Sinner to lift his second ATP Challenger trophy.

Majchrzak made the semifinals of the 2019 Ilkley Trophy Challenger and then qualified for Wimbledon without dropping a set. In the first round at Wimbledon he lost to Fernando Verdasco. At the 2019 Hall of Fame Open in Rhode Island he defeated Alastair Gray before losing a three set match to No. 1 seed John Isner in the second round. As a result, he reached the top 100 on 29 July 2019.

At the 2019 US Open, Majchrzak lost in the final round of qualifying. With the sudden withdrawal of Milos Raonic, he came in as a lucky loser, and defeated Nicolás Jarry and Pablo Cuevas – both in five-set thrillers to reach the third round at a Grand Slam for the first time in his career. He fell to Grigor Dimitrov in straight sets in the third round. He reached a new career-high of No. 83 on 23 September 19.

=== 2020: Inaugural ATP Cup, Injury and return ===
At the start of the year, Majchrzak participated in the inaugural 2020 ATP Cup before suffering from a broken pelvic bone. Subsequently, Majchrzak had to withdraw from the 2020 Australian Open and Maharashtra Open due to a groin injury. He would not compete again for more than seven months. In August he returned to tennis and participated at the US Open where he lost to Ernesto Escobedo in the first round.

In September, he transitioned to clay courts and won his third Challenger title at the Czech Open. In the final, he defeated top seed and defending champion Pablo Andújar. Majchrzak entered at the 2020 French Open with a protected ranking making his debut at this major. In the first round he lost to 15th seeded Karen Khachanov.

=== 2021: Masters & Olympics debut, First ATP quarterfinal ===
Majchrzak started his season at the 2021 Great Ocean Road Open in Melbourne, Australia, which was organized as a lead-up tournament to the 2021 Australian Open. He entered under a protected ranking and in the first round defeated Laslo Đere in straight sets.

The first five months of the year proved unsuccessful for Majchrzak, winning just three of his first ten matches across the ATP Tour and ATP Challenger Tour. He began to turn it around at the 2021 Italian Open where he qualified by defeating two top 100 players in Alexei Popyrin and Yoshihito Nishioka. He lost to Denis Shapovalov in the first round of the main draw. The following week he qualified at the 2021 ATP Lyon Open and won his first round match. He used his protected ranking as well to enter the main draw of the 2021 French Open and also reached the second round with a win over Arthur Cazaux. He had a successful grass court swing, reaching a semifinal and a final at back-to-back challengers in Nottingham, United Kingdom. However, he lost in qualifying at Wimbledon.

Majchrzak qualified to represent Poland at the 2020 Summer Olympics where he was defeated by Miomir Kecmanović in the first round.

He reached his second ATP Challenger final of the year at his home tournament, the 2021 Pekao Szczecin Open where he lost to Zdeněk Kolář.

Majchrzak qualified at the 2021 Sofia Open as a lucky loser after the withdrawal of fourth seed Alexander Bublik. He reached the quarterfinals of an ATP tournament for the first time in his career by defeating wildcard Dimitar Kuzmanov.

=== 2022–2023: ATP Cup semifinalist, top 75, doping suspension ===
At the 2022 ATP Cup, Majchrzak won all his three matches and helped Poland reach the semifinals for the first time, before testing positive for COVID-19 and having to withdraw late from the tournament. As a result, he was unable to participate at the 2022 Australian Open qualifications where he was seeded fourth and thus possibly missing the first Grand Slam of the year. He nevertheless entered the main draw after replacing Jenson Brooksby who withdrew due to COVID-19. He reached the second round for the first time at this major with a win over Andreas Seppi. Majchrzak lost to Alex de Minaur in the second round.

At the 2022 Tata Open Maharashtra he reached the semifinals of an ATP tournament for the first time in his career defeating second seed Lorenzo Musetti. As a result, he reached the top 75 in the rankings on 28 February 2022.

In May at the 2022 Geneva Open he clinched the biggest win of his career defeating 8th seed and World No. 41 Alexander Bublik in the first round in straight sets. He reached the quarterfinals only for the third time in his career defeating qualifier Marco Cecchinato. Majchrzak competed for Poland in their Davis Cup tie against Indonesia. He won two rubbers, losing just one game between them, to help Poland claim victory, 5–0.

In September at the 2022 Sofia Open he reached his third tour-level quarterfinal of the season, for a second year in a row, defeating Ričardas Berankis and eight seed Oscar Otte. He lost to eventual champion Marc-Andrea Huesler. At the 2022 Busan Open in South Korea, he won his fourth Challenger title defeating Radu Albot and as a result he moved 20 positions up back into the top 100 at No. 82 on 24 October 2022. On 9 December 2022, the International Tennis Integrity Agency announced that Majchrzak had been provisionally suspended after testing positive for banned substances at the Sofia Open, the Japan Open and the Seoul Challenger. In June 2023, the agency suspended Majchrzak for 13 months, while acknowledging that Majchrzak had not "knowingly or intentionally" committed an offense. Majchrzak's suspension ended on 29 December 2023.

=== 2024: Comeback, first Challenger titles since 2022, top 125 ===
Majchrzak returned to professional tennis on 31 December 2023. In his first tournament since 2022, he progressed through qualifying and won eight consecutive matches to capture the title in Monastir, Tunisia. He did not lose a set and won eight 6-0 sets throughout the tournament. He competed in another ITF event in Monastir the following week, winning two more matches to reach the quarterfinals before losing to Nicola Kuhn, ending the longest winning streak of his career. Following these results, he returned to the ATP rankings at world No. 944 on 15 January 2024.

At the end of January, Majchrzak received a wildcard to compete at the 2024 BW Open, marking his return to the ATP Challenger Tour. He defeated countryman Maks Kaśnikowski in three sets before losing to former world No. 12 and the eventual finalist, Borna Ćorić. In February, he was nominated for the Polish Davis Cup team, winning a dead rubber against Maxim Shin of Uzbekistan.

Ranked No. 652, Majchrzak received a wildcard to compete at the Rwanda Challenger. He defeated Bogdan Bobrov, Juan Pablo Paz, Calvin Hemery and Max Houkes en route to his first Challenger final since 2022. Majchrzak defeated Marco Trungelliti in the final to win his fifth Challenger title and first since his return from the suspension. He competed again in the second Rwanda Challenger where he came through qualifying to extend his winning streak at the tournament to 10 matches, defeating Ivan Gakhov, David Pichler and Stefan Kozlov to reach his second consecutive semifinal. He lost to Marco Trungelliti in a rematch of the previous week's final. Following this he won another ITF-level title at Sharm-el-Sheikh without dropping a set.

In May, he returned to form following some injury problems in April. He reached the final the Macedonia Open but lost to teenager Joel Schwärzler in the final. A few weeks later, won the Bratislava Open. He advanced through the qualifying draw and defeated top four players ranked inside the top 300 to win the biggest title of his comeback so far. He defeated the likes of Ergi Kırkın, Dmitry Popko, Jérôme Kym and Henrique Rocha en route. The following week, he played his first tournament in Poland since 2022 at the Poznan Open. During this tournament, he defeated former top 10 player Pablo Carreño Busta en route to the semifinals where he lost to compatriot Maks Kaśnikowski after suffering from a mid-match wrist injury. Despite the loss, he returned to the top 200 in the ATP rankings and guaranteed his place at US Open qualifying. In July, he reached another Challenger-level semifinal at the 2024 Platzmann Open.

He competed in qualifying at the 2024 US Open, marking his first appearance at a grand slam tournament since 2022. He defeated American wildcard Michael Zheng and Daniel Elahi Galán to reach the final round of qualifying where he ultimately then lost to the in-form Mattia Belucci. His win over world No. 129 Galán marked his best win by ranking since his comeback.

In September, Majchrzak was a member of the Polish Davis Cup Team that lost to South Korea in the 2024 Davis Cup World Group I. At the 2024 Saint-Tropez Open he defeated former top 100 player Borna Gojo, Harold Mayot, and Matteo Martineau to reach the semifinals. In the semifinals he lost to former 10 player Lucas Pouille, who went on to win the title.

In October, Majchrzak won his third title of the year at the 2024 JC Ferrero Challenger Open in Villena, Alicante Province, Spain. He defeated Nicolas Moreno de Alboran in straight sets in the final. He then competed at his second ATP Tour-level tournament at the 2024 Stockholm Open where he defeated Swedish wildcard Rafael Ymer in the first round of qualifying. As a result, he returned to the top 115 in the ATP singles rankings on 21 October 2024.

=== 2025: Wimbledon fourth round, Polish No. 1 ===
Majchrzak began the year as a member of the Polish Team at the 2025 United Cup as the reserve singles player. Poland reached the final. He then competed in qualifying event at the 2025 Australian Open. He saved a match point to defeat Marco Trungelliti in the opening round, before winning against Zachary Svajda, and Billy Harris to qualify for his first major since 2022. He lost in the opening round to Pablo Carreño Busta.

In March, he reached the semifinals of the 2025 San Diego Challenger, before qualifying for the main draw of 2025 Indian Wells Open. However, he withdrew from his first round match citing neck pain.

At the 2025 Grand Prix Hassan II, he qualified for the main draw and reached the semifinals defeating sixth seed Jaume Munar, Jesper de Jong, and former finalist and third seed Alexandre Muller. In the semifinals, he lost to Tallon Griekspoor. The following week, he won his eight ATP Challenger title at the 2025 Open Comunidad de Madrid and returned to the top 100 on 14 April 2025, for the first time since his ban.

At the 2025 Wimbledon Championships, he entered the main draw for the first time since 2022. It was the second time in his career that he made it to the third round of a Grand Slam event, with wins over former finalist and 32nd seed Matteo Berrettini in five sets, and Ethan Quinn. He defeated Arthur Rinderknech (who had upset 3rd seed Alexander Zverev in the first round) in straight sets to reach the fourth round at a Grand Slam for the first time and returned to the top 85 in the singles rankings on 14 July 2025. He ultimately lost to Karen Khachanov in the fourth round.

Following his Wimbledon run, he made the second round at the 2025 Swiss Open and won his ninth ATP Challenger title at the 2025 Kozerki Open.

At the US Open, he reached the third round for the second time at the tournament, with an upset over 9th seed Karen Khachanov, and achieved a career-high ranking in the top 65 on 8 September 2025, thus becoming the No. 1 ranked player from Poland. An incident occurred after the match where Majchrzak signed a cap for a boy when the cap was grabbed by a millionaire CEO of a paving company. The video went viral with the CEO, Piotr Szczerek, being forced to apologize. After a public search for the boy, Majchrzak personally gave him a new signed cap. In the following round he retired against Leandro Riedi in the first set. This injury also prompted him to withdraw from Poland's Davis Cup tie against Great Britain.

=== 2026: First ATP title, three Top 10 wins, Top 50 ===
At the 2026 Australian Open Majchrzak lost to Fabian Marozsan in the second round in straight sets, after suffering from muscle pain.

At the 2026 Miami Open he reached the third round, defeating world No. 21 Learner Tien, recording his second top 30 win.

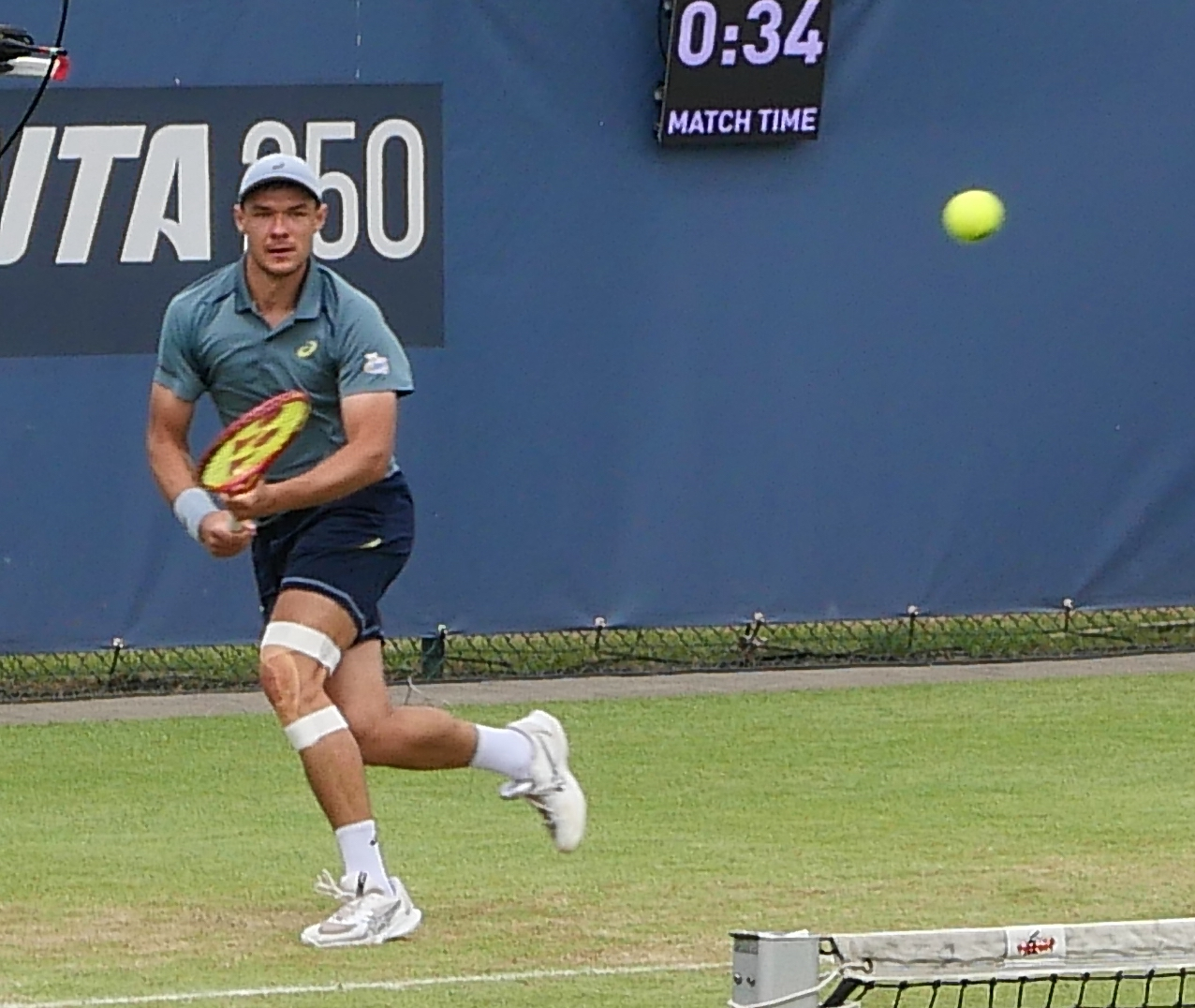
Majchrzak en route to the title at the 2026 Libéma Open

Majchrzak won his maiden ATP Tour title at the 2026 Libéma Open with upset wins over top seed Felix Auger-Aliassime, third seed Daniil Medvedev and second seed Alex de Minaur for his second, third and fourth top 10 wins. Majchrzak was just the sixth Polish man to reach a tour-level final in the Open Era, and the third to lift a tour-level trophy, joining 15-time champion Wojtek Fibak and Hubert Hurkacz. He became just the second man to earn three Top 10 wins en route to an ATP 250 title, since the series began, after Grigor Dimitrov in 2017 Brisbane. As a result he reached a new career-high ranking in the top 50 on 15 June 2026, of world No. 47.

== Performance timeline ==
Key
W	F	SF	QF	#R	RR	Q#	DNQ	A	NH

(W) winner; (F) finalist; (SF) semifinalist; (QF) quarterfinalist; (#R) rounds 4, 3, 2, 1; (RR) round-robin stage; (Q#) qualification round; (DNQ) did not qualify; (A) absent; (NH) not held; (SR) strike rate (events won / competed); (W–L) win–loss record.
To avoid confusion and double counting, these charts are updated at the conclusion of a tournament or when the player's participation has ended.

=== Singles ===
Current through the 2026 Libéma Open.

Tournament	2015	2016	2017	2018	2019	2020	2021	2022	2023	2024	2025	2026	SR	W–L	Win %
Grand Slam tournaments
Australian Open	A	A	A	Q1	1R	A	1R	2R	A	A	1R	2R	0 / 5	2–5	29%
French Open	A	A	A	Q1	Q1	1R	2R	1R	A	A	1R	1R	0 / 5	1–5	17%
Wimbledon	A	A	A	Q2	1R	NH	Q3	1R	A	A	4R	2R	0 / 3	4–4	50%
US Open	A	A	A	Q2	3R	1R	1R	1R	A	Q3	3R		0 / 5	4–5	44%
Win–loss	0–0	0–0	0–0	0–0	2–3	0–2	1–3	1–4	0–0	0–0	5–4	2–3	0 / 18	11–19	36%
ATP 1000 tournaments
Indian Wells Open	A	A	A	A	Q1	NH	A	2R	A	A	~~1R~~ (Note: Withdrew from main draw after qualifying)	2R	0 / 2	2–2	50%
Miami Open	A	A	A	A	Q1	NH	A	2R	A	A	Q1	3R	0 / 2	3–2	60%
Monte-Carlo Masters	A	A	A	A	A	NH	Q2	Q2	A	A	A	A	0 / 0	0–0	–
Madrid Open	A	A	A	A	A	NH	A	A	A	A	2R (Note: Entered the second round of the main draw as lucky loser, does not count as a win)	A	0 / 1	0–1	0%
Italian Open	A	A	A	A	A	A	1R	Q2	A	A	Q1	A	0 / 1	0–1	0%
Canadian Open	A	A	A	A	A	NH	A	A	A	A	A		0 / 0	0–0	–
Cincinnati Open	A	A	A	A	A	Q2	A	A	A	A	A		0 / 0	0–0	–
Shanghai Masters	A	A	A	A	A	NH			A	A	3R		0 / 1	2–1	67%
Paris Masters	A	A	A	A	A	A	A	A	A	A	Q1		0 / 0	0–0	–
Win–loss	0–0	0–0	0–0	0–0	0–0	0–0	0–1	2–2	0–0	0–0	2–2	3–2	0 / 6	7–7	50%
Career statistics
Tournaments	0	0	1	0	6	3	7	16	0	0	13	7	Career total: 53		
Overall win–loss	0–1	1–1	0–4	4–2	3–6	0–4	5–8	17–15	0–0	1–1	15–13	7–7	0 / 53	53–62	46%
Year-end ranking	275	279	197	177	101	107	116	78	—	120	64		$3,754,336		

== ATP Tour finals ==
=== Singles: 1 (title) ===
Legend Grand Slam (–) ATP 1000 (–) ATP 500 (–) ATP 250 (1–0)	Finals by surface Hard (–) Clay (–) Grass (1–0)	Finals by setting Outdoor (1–0) Indoor (–)

Result	W–L	Date	Tournament	Tier	Surface	Opponent	Score
Win	1–0	Jun 2026	Libéma Open, Netherlands	ATP 250	Grass	(Australia) Alex de Minaur	6–3, 2–6, 7–6^{(7–5)}

== ATP Challenger Tour finals ==
=== Singles: 15 (9 titles, 6 runner-ups) ===
Legend ATP Challenger Tour (9–6)	Finals by surface Hard (4–2) Clay (5–3) Grass (0–1)

Result	W–L	Date	Tournament	Tier	Surface	Opponent	Score
Loss	0–1	Oct 2015	Morocco Tennis Tour, Morocco	Challenger	Clay	(Spain) Roberto Carballés Baena	6–7^{(4–7)}, 2–6
Loss	0–2	Oct 2017	Tashkent Challenger, Uzbekistan	Challenger	Hard	(Spain) Guillermo García López	1–6, 6–7^{(1–7)}
Loss	0–3	Oct 2018	Tashkent Challenger, Uzbekistan	Challenger	Hard	(Canada) Félix Auger-Aliassime	3–6, 2–6
Win	1–3	Mar 2019	Open Harmonie, France	Challenger	Hard (i)	(France) Maxime Janvier	6–3, 7–6^{(7–1)}
Win	2–3	May 2019	Prosperita Open, Czech Republic	Challenger	Clay	(Italy) Jannik Sinner	6–1, 6–0
Win	3–3	Sep 2020	Moneta Czech Open, Czech Republic	Challenger	Clay	(Spain) Pablo Andújar	6–2, 7–6^{(7–5)}
Loss	3–4	Jun 2021	Nottingham Trophy, United Kingdom	Challenger	Grass	(Australia) Alex Bolt	6–4, 4–6, 3–6
Loss	3–5	Sep 2021	Szczecin Open, Poland	Challenger	Clay	(Czech Republic) Zdeněk Kolář	6–7^{(4–7)}, 5–7
Win	4–5	Oct 2022	Busan Open, South Korea	Challenger	Hard	(Moldova) Radu Albot	6–4, 3–6, 6–2
Win	5–5	Feb 2024	Rwanda Challenger, Rwanda	Challenger	Clay	(Argentina) Marco Trungelliti	6–4, 6–4
Loss	5–6	May 2024	Macedonian Open, North Macedonia	Challenger	Clay	(Austria) Joel Schwärzler	3–6, 3–6
Win	6–6	Jun 2024	Bratislava Open, Slovakia	Challenger	Clay	(Portugal) Henrique Rocha	6–0, 2–6, 6–3
Win	7–6	Sep 2024	Villena Open, Spain	Challenger	Hard	(United States) Nicolas Moreno de Alboran	6–4, 6–2
Win	8–6	April 2025	Open de Madrid, Spain	Challenger	Clay	(Croatia) Marin Čilić	6–3, 4–6, 6–4
Win	9–6	Aug 2025	Kozerki Open, Poland	Challenger	Hard	(Croatia) Dino Prižmić	6–4, 6–3

=== Doubles: 4 (1 title, 3 runner-ups) ===
Legend ATP Challenger Tour (1–3)	Finals by surface Hard (1–0) Clay (0–3)

Result	W–L	Date	Tournament	Tier	Surface	Partner	Opponents	Score
Loss	0–1	Sep 2015	Copa Sevilla, Spain	Challenger	Clay	(Italy) Marco Bortolotti	(Netherlands) Wesley Koolhof (Netherlands) Matwé Middelkoop	6–7^{(5–7)}, 4–6
Loss	0–2	Sep 2015	Arimex Trophy, Slovakia	Challenger	Clay	(France) Stéphane Robert	(Netherlands) Wesley Koolhof (Netherlands) Matwé Middelkoop	4–6, 2–6
Loss	0–3	Sep 2016	Poznań Open, Poland	Challenger	Clay	(Poland) Mateusz Kowalczyk	(Georgia (country)) Aleksandre Metreveli (Chinese Taipei) Peng Hsien-yin	4–6, 6–3, [8–10]
Win	1–3	Oct 2020	Tennis Challenger Hamburg, Germany	Challenger	Hard (i)	(Switzerland) Marc-Andrea Hüsler	(United Kingdom) Lloyd Glasspool (United States) Alex Lawson	6–3, 1–6, [20–18]

== ITF Tour finals ==
=== Singles: 16 (11 titles, 5 runner-ups) ===
Legend ITF Futures/WTT (11–5)	Finals by surface Hard (4–0) Clay (7–5)

Result	W–L	Date	Tournament	Tier	Surface	Opponent	Score
Win	1–0	Mar 2014	F4 Cartagena, Spain	Futures	Clay	(Spain) Roberto Carballés Baena	1–6, 7–6^{(7–4)}, 6–3
Win	2–0	Jul 2014	F2 Michalovce, Slovakia	Futures	Clay	(Czech Republic) Filip Brtnický	6–2, 6–3
Loss	2–1	Sep 2014	F7 Piekary Śląskie, Poland	Futures	Clay	(Czech Republic) Dušan Lojda	6–4, 3–6, 6–7^{(3–7)}
Loss	2–2	Jan 2015	F2 Cairo, Egypt	Futures	Clay	(Egypt) Mohamed Safwat	5–7, 3–6
Loss	2–3	Feb 2015	F3 Cairo, Egypt	Futures	Clay	(Serbia) Laslo Đere	3–6, 5–7
Win	3–3	Apr 2015	F9 Reus, Spain	Futures	Clay	(Spain) Marc Giner	6–3, 6–2
Win	4–3	May 2015	F4 Bacău, Romania	Futures	Clay	(Romania) Dragoș Dima	6–1, 6–2
Loss	4–4	May 2016	F2 Szeged, Hungary	Futures	Clay	(Belgium) Germain Gigounon	4–6, 3–6
Win	5–4	May 2016	F2 Cherkassy, Ukraine	Futures	Clay	(Ukraine) Vladyslav Manafov	6–2, 6–4
Win	6–4	Jun 2016	F3 Sopot, Poland	Futures	Clay	(Poland) Andriej Kapaś	7–5, 6–4
Win	7–4	Jan 2017	F1 Antalya, Turkey	Futures	Hard	(United Kingdom) Liam Broady	5–7, 6–3, 6–3
Loss	7–5	Jun 2017	F1 Sopot, Poland	Futures	Clay	(Czech Republic) Zdeněk Kolář	3–6, 2–6
Win	8–5	Oct 2017	F24 Rodez, France	Futures	Hard (i)	(France) Antoine Hoang	7–6^{(7–3)}, 2–6, 6–1
Win	9–5	Jan 2024	M15 Monastir, Tunisia	WTT	Hard (i)	(Japan) Ryuki Matsuda	6–1, 6–1
Win	10–5	Feb 2024	M25 Hammamet, Tunisia	WTT	Clay	(United Kingdom) Jay Clarke	6–3, 7–5
Win	11–5	Apr 2024	M25 Sharm El Sheikh, Egypt	WTT	Hard	(Egypt) Karim-Mohamed Maamoun	6–3, 6–2

=== Doubles: 7 (5 titles, 2 runner-ups) ===
Legend ITF Futures/WTT (5–2)	Finals by surface Hard (0–0) Clay (5–2)

Result	W–L	Date	Tournament	Tier	Surface	Partner	Opponents	Score
Loss	0–1	Aug 2013	F4 Poznań, Poland	Futures	Clay	(Poland) Phillip Gresk	(France) Romain Arneodo (Monaco) Benjamin Balleret	2–6, 4–6
Win	1–1	Jan 2015	F2 Cairo, Egypt	Futures	Clay	(France) Maxime Janvier	(South Korea) Na Jung-woong (South Korea) Yun Jae-won	6–2, 6–2
Win	2–1	Feb 2016	F2 Peguera, Spain	Futures	Clay	(Bosnia and Herzegovina) Tomislav Brkić	(Spain) Carlos Taberner (Japan) Kento Yamada	6–3, 6–4
Loss	2–2	May 2016	F2 Cherkassy, Ukraine	Futures	Clay	(Italy) Federico Maccari	(Estonia) Vladimir Ivanov (Lithuania) Lukas Mugevičius	3–6, 3–6
Win	3–2	Jun 2016	F2 Breda, Netherlands	Futures	Clay	(Bosnia and Herzegovina) Tomislav Brkić	(Egypt) Karim-Mohamed Maamoun (Serbia) Ilija Vučić	6–0, 6–2
Win	4–2	Mar 2017	F9 Antalya, Turkey	Futures	Clay	(Brazil) Pedro Sakamoto	(Brazil) Pedro Bernardi (Guatemala) Christopher Díaz Figueroa	6–2, 6–2
Win	5–2	Jun 2017	F3 Jablonec nad Nisou, Czech Republic	Futures	Clay	(Germany) Jan Choinski	(Czech Republic) Petr Michnev (Czech Republic) Matěj Vocel	7–6^{(7–4)}, 6–3

== Significant Junior results ==
=== Junior Grand Slam tournaments ===
==== Doubles: 1 (title) ====
Result	Year	Tournament	Surface	Partner	Opponents	Score
Win	2013	US Open	Hard	(United States) Martin Redlicki	(France) Quentin Halys (Portugal) Frederico Ferreira Silva	6–3, 6–4

=== Youth Olympics ===
==== Singles: 1 (gold medal) ====
Result	Year	Tournament	Surface	Opponent	Score
Gold	2014	Nanjing Youth Olympics	Hard	(Brazil) Orlando Luz	6–4, 7–5

==== Mixed doubles: 1 (bronze medal) ====
Result	Year	Tournament	Surface	Partner	Opponents	Score
Bronze	2014	Nanjing Youth Olympics	Hard	(Hungary) Fanny Stollár	(Romania) Ioana Ducu (Argentina) Matías Zukas	6–3, 3–6, [10–5]

== Wins over top 10 players ==
- Majchrzak has a 4–4 (50%) record against players who were, at the time the match was played, ranked in the top 10.

Season	2025	2026	Total
Wins	1	3	4

#	Player	Rank	Event	Surface	Rd	Score	Rk
2025
1.	Karen Khachanov	9	US Open, United States	Hard	2R	2–6, 6–7^{(4–7)}, 6–4, 7–5, 7–6^{(10–5)}	76
2026
2.	(Canada) Félix Auger-Aliassime	4	Rosmalen Championships, Netherlands	Grass	QF	6–4, 6–3	76
3.	Daniil Medvedev	8	Rosmalen Championships, Netherlands	Grass	SF	7–6^{(7–4)}, 6–1	76
4.	(Australia) Alex de Minaur	6	Rosmalen Championships, Netherlands	Grass	F	6–3, 2–6, 7–6^{(7–5)}	76

- Key: (Rk) first use, opponent rank; (Rd) round; (Rk) 2nd use, player rank; (Ref) reference; (F) final; (SF) semifinal; (QF) quarterfinal; (#R) rounds 4, 3, 2, 1; (RR) round-robin stage; (Q#) qualifying rounds or stages (3), 2, 1.

*As of 14 June 2026
