= Open Comunidad de Madrid =

- 2025 Open Comunidad de Madrid

ATP Challenger Tour
- Event name: Grand Prix Open Comunidad de Madrid by Silverway Asset Management (2026-)
- Location: Madrid, Spain
- Venue: Club de Campo Villa de Madrid
- Category: ATP Challenger Tour 100
- Surface: Clay
- Website: grandprixmadrid.es

The Grand Prix Open Comunidad de Madrid is a professional tennis tournament played on clay courts. It is currently part of the Association of Tennis Professionals (ATP) Challenger Tour. It is held in Madrid, Spain since 2022.

== Past finals ==
=== Singles ===
Year	Champion	Runner-up	Score
2026	(Hungary) Zsombor Piros	(Austria) Jurij Rodionov	7–5, 6–2
2025	(Poland) Kamil Majchrzak	(Croatia) Marin Čilić	6–3, 4–6, 6–4
2024	(Italy) Stefano Napolitano	(Switzerland) Leandro Riedi	6–3, 6–3
2023	Alexander Shevchenko	(Argentina) Pedro Cachin	6–4, 6–3
2022	(Argentina) Pedro Cachin	(Argentina) Marco Trungelliti	6–3, 6–7^{(3–7)}, 6–3

=== Doubles ===
Year	Champions	Runners-up	Score
2026	(Czech Republic) Andrew Paulson (Czech Republic) Michael Vrbenský	(United States) George Goldhoff (United States) Trey Hilderbrand	2–6, 6–4, [10–8]
2025	(Portugal) Francisco Cabral (Austria) Lucas Miedler	(Switzerland) Jakub Paul (Netherlands) David Pel	7–6^{(7–2)}, 6–4
2024	(Finland) Harri Heliövaara (United Kingdom) Henry Patten	(Argentina) Guido Andreozzi (Mexico) Miguel Ángel Reyes-Varela	7–5, 7–6^{(7–1)}
2023	Ivan Liutarevich (Ukraine) Vladyslav Manafov	(Finland) Patrik Niklas-Salminen (Netherlands) Bart Stevens	6–4, 6–4
2022	(Czech Republic) Adam Pavlásek (Slovakia) Igor Zelenay	(Brazil) Rafael Matos (Spain) David Vega Hernández	6–3, 3–6, [10–6]
