= 2024 ITF Men's World Tennis Tour (July–September) =

The 2024 ITF Men's World Tennis Tour is the 2024 edition of the second-tier tour for men's professional tennis. It is organised by the International Tennis Federation and is a tier below the ATP Challenger Tour. The ITF Men's World Tennis Tour includes tournaments with prize money ranging from $15,000 to $25,000.

Since 2022, following the Russian invasion of Ukraine the ITF announced that players from Belarus and Russia could still play on the tour but would not be allowed to play under the flag of Belarus or Russia.

== Key ==
M25 tournaments
M15 tournaments

== Month ==
=== July ===
Week of	Tournament	Winner	Runners-up	Semifinalists	Quarterfinalists
July 1	Laval, Canada; Hard; M25; Singles and doubles draws	(United States) Eliot Spizzirri; 6–4, 6–3	(United States) Karl Poling	(United Kingdom) Aidan McHugh (France) Clément Chidekh	(Canada) Liam Draxl (New Zealand) Kiranpal Pannu (Jamaica) Blaise Bicknell (United States) James Tracy
July 1	Laval, Canada; Hard; M25; Singles and doubles draws	(United States) Alexander Bernard (United States) James Tracy; 3–6, 6–4, [10–5]	(Canada) Liam Draxl (Canada) Cleeve Harper	(United Kingdom) Aidan McHugh (France) Clément Chidekh	(Canada) Liam Draxl (New Zealand) Kiranpal Pannu (Jamaica) Blaise Bicknell (United States) James Tracy
July 1	Ajaccio, France; Hard; M25; Singles and doubles draws	(France) Jules Marie; 6–2, 6–4	(Australia) Blake Ellis	(Zimbabwe) Benjamin Lock (Australia) James McCabe	(France) Kenny de Schepper (France) Robin Bertrand (France) Lucas Poullain (France) Laurent Lokoli
July 1	Ajaccio, France; Hard; M25; Singles and doubles draws	(Australia) Blake Ellis (Zimbabwe) Benjamin Lock; 3–6, 6–4, [10–5]	(France) Yanis Ghazouani Durand (France) Loann Massard	(Zimbabwe) Benjamin Lock (Australia) James McCabe	(France) Kenny de Schepper (France) Robin Bertrand (France) Lucas Poullain (France) Laurent Lokoli
July 1	Marburg, Germany; Clay; M25; Singles and doubles draws	(Brazil) Mateus Alves; 7–6^{(7–5)}, 1–6, 6–4	(Belgium) Raphaël Collignon	(Georgia (country)) Saba Purtseladze (Germany) Lucas Gerch	(Germany) Timo Stodder (Poland) Daniel Michalski (Belgium) Buvaysar Gadamauri (Bulgaria) Yanaki Milev
July 1	Marburg, Germany; Clay; M25; Singles and doubles draws	(Belgium) Buvaysar Gadamauri (United Kingdom) Anton Matusevich; 6–3, 6–3	(Czech Republic) Daniel Pátý (Czech Republic) Dominik Reček	(Georgia (country)) Saba Purtseladze (Germany) Lucas Gerch	(Germany) Timo Stodder (Poland) Daniel Michalski (Belgium) Buvaysar Gadamauri (Bulgaria) Yanaki Milev
July 1	Getxo, Spain; Clay; M25; Singles and doubles draws	(Spain) Miguel Damas; 6–0, 6–7^{(3–7)}, 6–0	Ivan Gakhov	(Spain) Benjamín Winter López (Peru) Ignacio Buse	(Turkey) Kuzey Çekirge (Portugal) João Domingues (Spain) Max Alcalá Gurri (Spain) John Echeverría
July 1	Getxo, Spain; Clay; M25; Singles and doubles draws	(France) Louis Dussin (France) Matt Ponchet; 7–6^{(7–4)}, 6–3	(Spain) Max Alcalá Gurri (Spain) Àlex Martí Pujolràs	(Spain) Benjamín Winter López (Peru) Ignacio Buse	(Turkey) Kuzey Çekirge (Portugal) João Domingues (Spain) Max Alcalá Gurri (Spain) John Echeverría
July 1	Belém, Brazil; Hard; M15; Singles and doubles draws	(Brazil) Pedro Sakamoto; 6–4, 6–1	(United States) Alexander Stater	(Brazil) José Pereira (Brazil) Lorenzo Esquici	(Brazil) Rafael Tosetto (Brazil) Igor Gimenez (Brazil) Mateo Barreiros Reyes (Brazil) Lucas Andrade da Silva
July 1	Belém, Brazil; Hard; M15; Singles and doubles draws	(Brazil) Vítor Leal (Brazil) Nicolas Oliveira; 6–3, 6–7^{(5–7)}, [10–7]	(Brazil) Joaquim Almeida (Brazil) Lorenzo Esquici	(Brazil) José Pereira (Brazil) Lorenzo Esquici	(Brazil) Rafael Tosetto (Brazil) Igor Gimenez (Brazil) Mateo Barreiros Reyes (Brazil) Lucas Andrade da Silva
July 1	Tianjin, China; Hard; M15; Singles and doubles draws	(China) Zhou Yi; 6–3, 6–4	Evgeny Donskoy	(Philippines) Alberto Lim Jr. (Vietnam) Lý Hoàng Nam	(Indonesia) Justin Barki (Australia) Moerani Bouzige (Kazakhstan) Grigoriy Lomakin (India) Mukund Sasikumar
July 1	Tianjin, China; Hard; M15; Singles and doubles draws	(China) Sun Qian (China) Tang Sheng; 7–6^{(11–9)}, 6–3	(Chinese Taipei) Lee Kuan-yi (Chinese Taipei) Yin Bang-shuo	(Philippines) Alberto Lim Jr. (Vietnam) Lý Hoàng Nam	(Indonesia) Justin Barki (Australia) Moerani Bouzige (Kazakhstan) Grigoriy Lomakin (India) Mukund Sasikumar
July 1	Tokyo, Japan; Hard (i); M15; Singles and doubles draws	(Latvia) Kārlis Ozoliņš; 6–3, 6–4	(Japan) Masamichi Imamura	(Japan) Naoki Nakagawa (Japan) Kokoro Isomura	(South Korea) Lee Jea-moon (Japan) Yusuke Takahashi (Japan) Shu Matsuoka (Japan) Makoto Ochi
July 1	Tokyo, Japan; Hard (i); M15; Singles and doubles draws	(Japan) Yusuke Kusuhara (Japan) Shunsuke Nakagawa; 6–4, 7–6^{(8–6)}	(Japan) Sho Katayama (Japan) Yuhei Kono	(Japan) Naoki Nakagawa (Japan) Kokoro Isomura	(South Korea) Lee Jea-moon (Japan) Yusuke Takahashi (Japan) Shu Matsuoka (Japan) Makoto Ochi
July 1	Ust-Kamenogorsk, Kazakhstan; Hard; M15; Singles and doubles draws	Martin Borisiouk; 6–2, 6–1	(Uzbekistan) Sergey Fomin	Egor Agafonov; Maxim Zhukov	(Japan) Kazuma Kawachi (Japan) Shinji Hazawa; Ivan Denisov (India) Siddharth Vishwakarma
July 1	Ust-Kamenogorsk, Kazakhstan; Hard; M15; Singles and doubles draws	(Japan) Shinji Hazawa (Japan) Kazuma Kawachi; 6–3, 6–3	(Kazakhstan) Islam Orynbasar (Kazakhstan) Yerassyl Yerdilda	Egor Agafonov; Maxim Zhukov	(Japan) Kazuma Kawachi (Japan) Shinji Hazawa; Ivan Denisov (India) Siddharth Vishwakarma
July 1	Amstelveen, Netherlands; Clay; M15; Singles and doubles draws	(Netherlands) Max Houkes; 6–3, 3–0, ret.	(Germany) John Sperle	(Belgium) Simon Beaupain (Netherlands) Stijn Paardekooper	(Netherlands) Stijn Pel (Germany) Florian Broska (Netherlands) Alec Deckers (Morocco) Younes Lalami Laaroussi
July 1	Amstelveen, Netherlands; Clay; M15; Singles and doubles draws	(Netherlands) Brian Bozemoj (Netherlands) Stijn Paardekooper; 6–1, 6–3	(Netherlands) Stian Klaassen (Netherlands) Freek van Donselaar	(Belgium) Simon Beaupain (Netherlands) Stijn Paardekooper	(Netherlands) Stijn Pel (Germany) Florian Broska (Netherlands) Alec Deckers (Morocco) Younes Lalami Laaroussi
July 1	Kuršumlijska Banja, Serbia; Clay; M15; Singles and doubles draws	(France) Luka Pavlovic; 7–6^{(7–5)}, 6–1	(Hungary) Péter Fajta	(Czech Republic) Dominik Kellovský; Andrey Chepelev	(Serbia) Dušan Obradović (Serbia) Aleksa Pisarić (Denmark) Carl Emil Overbeck (Serbia) Viktor Jović
July 1	Kuršumlijska Banja, Serbia; Clay; M15; Singles and doubles draws	(Italy) Simone Agostini (Argentina) Juan Pablo Paz; 6–4, 7–5	(Denmark) Carl Emil Overbeck (Sweden) Olle Sonesson Lidholt	(Czech Republic) Dominik Kellovský; Andrey Chepelev	(Serbia) Dušan Obradović (Serbia) Aleksa Pisarić (Denmark) Carl Emil Overbeck (Serbia) Viktor Jović
July 1	Štore, Slovenia; Clay; M15; Singles and doubles draws	(Italy) Gianluca Cadenasso; 3–6, 7–5, 6–3	(Italy) Lorenzo Carboni	(Slovenia) Bor Artnak (Argentina) Juan Estévez	(Italy) Samuele Pieri (Slovenia) Sebastian Dominko (Argentina) Nikos Lehmann (Czech Republic) Matyáš Černý
July 1	Štore, Slovenia; Clay; M15; Singles and doubles draws	(Italy) Jacopo Bilardo (Italy) Gianluca Cadenasso; 6–4, 7–6^{(7–5)}	(Slovenia) Sebastian Dominko (Austria) Jan Kobierski	(Slovenia) Bor Artnak (Argentina) Juan Estévez	(Italy) Samuele Pieri (Slovenia) Sebastian Dominko (Argentina) Nikos Lehmann (Czech Republic) Matyáš Černý
July 1	Hillcrest, South Africa; Hard; M15; Singles and doubles draws	(South Africa) Devin Badenhorst; 7–6^{(8–6)}, 6–4	(South Africa) Kris van Wyk	(South Africa) Khololwam Montsi (South Africa) Philip Henning	(South Africa) Alec Deckers (India) Aryan Shah (Germany) Nico Hornitschek (United Kingdom) Toby Martin
July 1	Hillcrest, South Africa; Hard; M15; Singles and doubles draws	(South Africa) Devin Badenhorst (United Kingdom) Luc Koenig; 6–3, 7–6^{(7–3)}	(India) Ishaque Eqbal (India) Aryan Shah	(South Africa) Khololwam Montsi (South Africa) Philip Henning	(South Africa) Alec Deckers (India) Aryan Shah (Germany) Nico Hornitschek (United Kingdom) Toby Martin
July 1	Nakhon Si Thammarat, Thailand; Hard; M15; Singles and doubles draws	(Thailand) Kasidit Samrej; 6–4, 6–3	(Malaysia) Mitsuki Wei Kang Leong	(New Zealand) Isaac Becroft (India) Adil Kalyanpur	(Thailand) Thantub Suksumrarn (Australia) Chase Ferguson (Japan) Issei Okamura (Australia) Jake Delaney
July 1	Nakhon Si Thammarat, Thailand; Hard; M15; Singles and doubles draws	(India) Adil Kalyanpur (India) Vishnu Vardhan; 6–3, 6–2	(Philippines) Francis Alcantara (Thailand) Maximus Jones	(New Zealand) Isaac Becroft (India) Adil Kalyanpur	(Thailand) Thantub Suksumrarn (Australia) Chase Ferguson (Japan) Issei Okamura (Australia) Jake Delaney
July 1	Monastir, Tunisia; Hard; M15; Singles and doubles draws	Ilia Simakin; 6–7^{(4–7)}, 6–1, 6–3	(Croatia) Mili Poljičak	(Switzerland) Patrick Schön (Spain) Gabriel Elicha Navas	(Spain) Sergio Callejón Hernando (Egypt) Amr Elsayed; Mikhail Gorokhov (France) Nicolas Jadoun
July 1	Monastir, Tunisia; Hard; M15; Singles and doubles draws	(Portugal) Pedro Araújo (Switzerland) Patrick Schön; 6–7^{(9–11)}, 6–1, [10–5]	Nikita Ianin (Canada) Sasha Trkulja	(Switzerland) Patrick Schön (Spain) Gabriel Elicha Navas	(Spain) Sergio Callejón Hernando (Egypt) Amr Elsayed; Mikhail Gorokhov (France) Nicolas Jadoun
July 1	Lakewood, United States; Hard; M15; Singles and doubles draws	(United States) Govind Nanda; 6–4, 5–7, 7–5	(United States) Stefan Dostanic	(Brazil) Karue Sell (Turkey) Arda Azkara	(United States) Emon van Loben Sels (United States) Jack Anthrop (Japan) Kosuke Ogura (Mexico) Alan Fernando Rubio Fierros
July 1	Lakewood, United States; Hard; M15; Singles and doubles draws	(United States) Nathan Ponwith (United States) Keegan Smith; 6–4, 6–4	(Australia) Joshua Charlton (United States) Wally Thayne	(Brazil) Karue Sell (Turkey) Arda Azkara	(United States) Emon van Loben Sels (United States) Jack Anthrop (Japan) Kosuke Ogura (Mexico) Alan Fernando Rubio Fierros
July 8	São Paulo, Brazil; Clay; M25; Singles and doubles draws	(Brazil) Pedro Sakamoto; 7–6^{(7–4)}, 7–6^{(8–6)}	(Argentina) Tomás Farjat	(Argentina) Valerio Aboian (Bolivia) Juan Carlos Prado Ángelo	(Mexico) Alex Hernández (Brazil) Pedro Boscardin Dias (Dominican Republic) Peter Bertran (Brazil) Eduardo Ribeiro
July 8	São Paulo, Brazil; Clay; M25; Singles and doubles draws	(Brazil) Mateo Barreiros Reyes (Brazil) Igor Gimenez; 6–1, 6–0	(Brazil) Luis Guto Miguel (Brazil) Nicolas Oliveira	(Argentina) Valerio Aboian (Bolivia) Juan Carlos Prado Ángelo	(Mexico) Alex Hernández (Brazil) Pedro Boscardin Dias (Dominican Republic) Peter Bertran (Brazil) Eduardo Ribeiro
July 8	Tianjin, China; Hard; M25; Singles and doubles draws	(China) Bai Yan; 6–2, 6–4	(Chinese Taipei) Hsu Yu-hsiou	(Japan) Ryotaro Taguchi; Evgeny Donskoy	(China) Te Rigele (Kazakhstan) Grigoriy Lomakin (Vietnam) Lý Hoàng Nam (India) Mukund Sasikumar
July 8	Tianjin, China; Hard; M25; Singles and doubles draws	(Chinese Taipei) Hsu Yu-hsiou (Japan) Ryotaro Taguchi; 3–6, 6–3, [14–12]	(South Korea) Chung Yun-seong (China) Sun Fajing	(Japan) Ryotaro Taguchi; Evgeny Donskoy	(China) Te Rigele (Kazakhstan) Grigoriy Lomakin (Vietnam) Lý Hoàng Nam (India) Mukund Sasikumar
July 8	Uriage-les-Bains, France; Clay; M25; Singles and doubles draws	(France) Gabriel Debru; 6–1, 6–3	(France) Maxime Chazal	(France) Florent Bax (Spain) Pol Martín Tiffon	(France) Émilien Voisin (France) Lilian Marmousez (Brazil) João Eduardo Schiessl (France) Étienne Donnet
July 8	Uriage-les-Bains, France; Clay; M25; Singles and doubles draws	(France) Alexandre Aubriot (France) Florent Bax; 6–3, 2–6, [10–5]	(France) Gabriel Debru (France) Tiago Pires	(France) Florent Bax (Spain) Pol Martín Tiffon	(France) Émilien Voisin (France) Lilian Marmousez (Brazil) João Eduardo Schiessl (France) Étienne Donnet
July 8	Kassel, Germany; Clay; M25; Singles and doubles draws	(Belgium) Raphaël Collignon; 6–1, 6–4	(Uzbekistan) Khumoyun Sultanov	(Ecuador) Álvaro Guillén Meza (Belgium) Gauthier Onclin	(France) Arthur Weber (Poland) Daniel Michalski (United Kingdom) Anton Matusevich (Czech Republic) Daniel Siniakov
July 8	Kassel, Germany; Clay; M25; Singles and doubles draws	(United Kingdom) Anton Matusevich (Germany) Kai Wehnelt; 6–4, 2–6, [10–5]	(Germany) David Fix (Germany) Lasse Pörtner	(Ecuador) Álvaro Guillén Meza (Belgium) Gauthier Onclin	(France) Arthur Weber (Poland) Daniel Michalski (United Kingdom) Anton Matusevich (Czech Republic) Daniel Siniakov
July 8	Padua, Italy; Clay; M25; Singles and doubles draws	(Italy) Gianluca Mager; 4–6, 6–2, 6–4	(Ukraine) Oleksandr Ovcharenko	(Italy) Noah Perfetti (Italy) Gabriele Pennaforti	(Italy) Giulio Perego (Italy) Stefano D'Agostino (Slovakia) Andrej Martin (Italy) Gianmarco Ferrari
July 8	Padua, Italy; Clay; M25; Singles and doubles draws	(Italy) Gianluca Cadenasso (Italy) Noah Perfetti; 6–3, 6–4	(Italy) Luca Giacomini (Italy) Giovanni Oradini	(Italy) Noah Perfetti (Italy) Gabriele Pennaforti	(Italy) Giulio Perego (Italy) Stefano D'Agostino (Slovakia) Andrej Martin (Italy) Gianmarco Ferrari
July 8	The Hague, Netherlands; Clay; M25; Singles and doubles draws	(United Kingdom) Oliver Crawford; 6–0, 6–1	(Spain) Àlex Martí Pujolràs	(Netherlands) Max Houkes (Netherlands) Guy den Ouden	(Netherlands) Niels Visker (France) Mathys Erhard (United States) Felix Corwin (Netherlands) Deney Wassermann
July 8	The Hague, Netherlands; Clay; M25; Singles and doubles draws	(Netherlands) Jarno Jans (Netherlands) Thijmen Loof; 6–1, 3–6, [10–6]	(Netherlands) Rik Muller (Netherlands) Lodewijk Weststrate	(Netherlands) Max Houkes (Netherlands) Guy den Ouden	(Netherlands) Niels Visker (France) Mathys Erhard (United States) Felix Corwin (Netherlands) Deney Wassermann
July 8	Roda de Berà, Spain; Hard; M25; Singles and doubles draws	(Canada) Steven Diez; 6–2, 2–6, 6–3	(Spain) Alberto Barroso Campos	(Portugal) Frederico Ferreira Silva (Zimbabwe) Benjamin Lock	(France) Antoine Escoffier (Chile) Diego Fernández Flores (Spain) Roger Pascual Ferrà (Spain) Iker Urribarrens Ramírez
July 8	Roda de Berà, Spain; Hard; M25; Singles and doubles draws	(Spain) Alberto Barroso Campos (Spain) Bruno Pujol Navarro; 6–2, 6–2	(United States) Alexander Bravo (Spain) Sergi Pérez Contri	(Portugal) Frederico Ferreira Silva (Zimbabwe) Benjamin Lock	(France) Antoine Escoffier (Chile) Diego Fernández Flores (Spain) Roger Pascual Ferrà (Spain) Iker Urribarrens Ramírez
July 8	Nottingham, United Kingdom; Hard; M25; Singles and doubles draws	(Denmark) August Holmgren; 4–6, 6–2, 6–2	(United Kingdom) Jack Pinnington Jones	(United Kingdom) Harry Wendelken (United Kingdom) Emile Hudd	(United Kingdom) Hugo Coquelin (Australia) Blake Mott (Australia) James McCabe (United Kingdom) Kyle Edmund
July 8	Nottingham, United Kingdom; Hard; M25; Singles and doubles draws	(United Kingdom) Finn Bass (United Kingdom) Emile Hudd; 6–3, 6–3	(United Kingdom) William Nolan (United Kingdom) Jack Pinnington Jones	(United Kingdom) Harry Wendelken (United Kingdom) Emile Hudd	(United Kingdom) Hugo Coquelin (Australia) Blake Mott (Australia) James McCabe (United Kingdom) Kyle Edmund
July 8	Dallas, United States; Hard; M25; Singles and doubles draws	(United States) Adam Neff; 7–6^{(7–5)}, 4–6, 6–2	(United States) Colton Smith	(United States) Tyler Zink (Brazil) Karue Sell	(United States) Nick Chappell (France) Enzo Wallart (United Kingdom) Aidan McHugh (United States) Harrison Adams
July 8	Dallas, United States; Hard; M25; Singles and doubles draws	(Japan) Shunsuke Mitsui (United Kingdom) Johannus Monday; 6–4, 6–4	(United States) Alexander Kotzen (United States) Tristan McCormick	(United States) Tyler Zink (Brazil) Karue Sell	(United States) Nick Chappell (France) Enzo Wallart (United Kingdom) Aidan McHugh (United States) Harrison Adams
July 8	Umag, Croatia; Clay; M15; Singles and doubles draws	(Croatia) Mili Poljičak; 7–5, 7–6^{(7–3)}	(Croatia) Nikola Bašić	(France) Corentin Denolly (France) Louis Tessa	(Czech Republic) Jiří Čížek (Australia) Edward Winter (Italy) Gabriele Maria Noce (France) Adam Panaras
July 8	Umag, Croatia; Clay; M15; Singles and doubles draws	(Germany) Maximilian Homberg (Australia) Edward Winter; 7–6^{(7–4)}, 6–4	(France) Lucas Bouquet (France) Corentin Denolly	(France) Corentin Denolly (France) Louis Tessa	(Czech Republic) Jiří Čížek (Australia) Edward Winter (Italy) Gabriele Maria Noce (France) Adam Panaras
July 8	Tokyo, Japan; Hard (i); M15; Singles and doubles draws	(Japan) Shintaro Imai; 6–4, 6–4	(South Korea) Shin Woo-bin	(Japan) Ryota Tanuma (South Korea) Lee Jea-moon	(Japan) Taisei Ichikawa (Japan) Sho Katayama (Japan) Taiyo Yamanaka (Japan) Kokoro Isomura
July 8	Tokyo, Japan; Hard (i); M15; Singles and doubles draws	(South Korea) Shin San-hui (South Korea) Shin Woo-bin; 6–4, 6–4	(South Korea) Lee Jea-moon (South Korea) Song Min-kyu	(Japan) Ryota Tanuma (South Korea) Lee Jea-moon	(Japan) Taisei Ichikawa (Japan) Sho Katayama (Japan) Taiyo Yamanaka (Japan) Kokoro Isomura
July 8	Łódź, Poland; Clay; M15; Singles and doubles draws	(Poland) Maciej Rajski; 6–2, 7–6^{(7–3)}	(Ukraine) Nikita Mashtakov	(Luxembourg) Chris Rodesch (Poland) Filip Pieczonka	(Czech Republic) Marek Gengel (Poland) Olaf Pieczkowski (Poland) Paweł Juszczak (Latvia) Mārtiņš Rocēns
July 8	Łódź, Poland; Clay; M15; Singles and doubles draws	(Poland) Szymon Kielan (Poland) Filip Pieczonka; 7–5, 6–2	(Poland) Fryderyk Lechno-Wasiutyński (Poland) Kacper Szymkowiak	(Luxembourg) Chris Rodesch (Poland) Filip Pieczonka	(Czech Republic) Marek Gengel (Poland) Olaf Pieczkowski (Poland) Paweł Juszczak (Latvia) Mārtiņš Rocēns
July 8	Kuršumlijska Banja, Serbia; Clay; M15; Singles and doubles draws	(Italy) Federico Bondioli; 6–3, 5–7, 7–6^{(7–1)}	(Denmark) Carl Emil Overbeck	(Argentina) Juan Manuel La Serna (Serbia) Branko Đurić	(Italy) Andrea Fiorentini (Ukraine) Tymur Bieldiugin (Czech Republic) Dominik Kellovský (Belgium) Nicolas Ifi
July 8	Kuršumlijska Banja, Serbia; Clay; M15; Singles and doubles draws	(Italy) Gregorio Biondolillo (Venezuela) Ignacio Parisca; 6–4, 4–6, [10–3]	(Serbia) Stefan Latinović (Serbia) Novak Novaković	(Argentina) Juan Manuel La Serna (Serbia) Branko Đurić	(Italy) Andrea Fiorentini (Ukraine) Tymur Bieldiugin (Czech Republic) Dominik Kellovský (Belgium) Nicolas Ifi
July 8	Litija, Slovenia; Clay; M15; Singles and doubles draws	(Slovenia) Bor Artnak; 6–2, 6–3	(Germany) Peter Heller	(Italy) Luca Castagnola (Italy) Mariano Tammaro	(Italy) Gabriele Bosio (Slovenia) Filip Jeff Planinšek (Italy) Niccolò Ciavarella (Netherlands) Jurriaan Bol
July 8	Litija, Slovenia; Clay; M15; Singles and doubles draws	(Slovenia) Matic Križnik (Slovenia) Jan Kupčič; 2–6, 6–4, [10–5]	(Italy) Gabriele Bosio (Egypt) Fares Zakaria	(Italy) Luca Castagnola (Italy) Mariano Tammaro	(Italy) Gabriele Bosio (Slovenia) Filip Jeff Planinšek (Italy) Niccolò Ciavarella (Netherlands) Jurriaan Bol
July 8	Nakhon Si Thammarat, Thailand; Hard; M15; Singles and doubles draws	(Thailand) Kasidit Samrej; 6–3, 6–2	(Thailand) Pawit Sornlaksup	(Thailand) Thanapet Chanta (New Zealand) Ajeet Rai	(Israel) Amit Vales (Thailand) Thanaphat Boosarawongse (Australia) Jesse Delaney (Malaysia) Mitsuki Wei Kang Leong
July 8	Nakhon Si Thammarat, Thailand; Hard; M15; Singles and doubles draws	(Philippines) Francis Alcantara (Thailand) Maximus Jones; 7–6^{(9–7)}, 6–4	(India) Rishi Reddy (India) Dhakshineswar Suresh	(Thailand) Thanapet Chanta (New Zealand) Ajeet Rai	(Israel) Amit Vales (Thailand) Thanaphat Boosarawongse (Australia) Jesse Delaney (Malaysia) Mitsuki Wei Kang Leong
July 8	Monastir, Tunisia; Hard; M15; Singles and doubles draws	(Ivory Coast) Eliakim Coulibaly; 6–0, 2–0, ret.	(Tunisia) Aziz Ouakaa	(Greece) Ioannis Xilas (Portugal) Tiago Pereira	Mikhail Gorokhov (Switzerland) Patrick Schön (Morocco) Mehdi Benchakroun (Algeria) Samir Hamza Reguig
July 8	Monastir, Tunisia; Hard; M15; Singles and doubles draws	(United Kingdom) Billy Blaydes (United Kingdom) Freddy Blaydes; 7–5, 6–0	(Morocco) Mehdi Benchakroun (Morocco) Hamza El Amine	(Greece) Ioannis Xilas (Portugal) Tiago Pereira	Mikhail Gorokhov (Switzerland) Patrick Schön (Morocco) Mehdi Benchakroun (Algeria) Samir Hamza Reguig
July 8	Lakewood, United States; Hard; M15; Singles and doubles draws	(United States) Learner Tien; 6–3, 6–3	(United States) Govind Nanda	(United States) Keegan Smith (United States) Karl Kazuma Lee	(United States) Rudy Quan (United States) Matt Kuhar (United States) Jelani Sarr (United States) Kyle Kang
July 8	Lakewood, United States; Hard; M15; Singles and doubles draws	(United States) Nathan Ponwith (United States) Keegan Smith; 6–2, 6–2	(United Kingdom) Adam Jones (Mexico) Alan Fernando Rubio Fierros	(United States) Keegan Smith (United States) Karl Kazuma Lee	(United States) Rudy Quan (United States) Matt Kuhar (United States) Jelani Sarr (United States) Kyle Kang
July 15	Telfs, Austria; Clay; M25; Singles and doubles draws	(Argentina) Facundo Mena; 6–4, 6–2	(Austria) Lukas Neumayer	(United States) Toby Kodat (Italy) Gianluca Mager	(Australia) Matthew Dellavedova (Brazil) Daniel Dutra da Silva; Kirill Kivattsev (Brazil) Mateus Alves
July 15	Telfs, Austria; Clay; M25; Singles and doubles draws	(United States) Maxwell Benson (United States) Oren Vasser; 7–6^{(8–6)}, 6–4	(Italy) Stefano D'Agostino (Italy) Manuel Plunger	(United States) Toby Kodat (Italy) Gianluca Mager	(Australia) Matthew Dellavedova (Brazil) Daniel Dutra da Silva; Kirill Kivattsev (Brazil) Mateus Alves
July 15	Tianjin, China; Hard; M25; Singles and doubles draws	(China) Zhou Yi; 4–6, 6–3, 7–5	(China) Sun Fajing	(Chinese Taipei) Hsu Yu-hsiou; Aliaksandr Liaonenka	(Vietnam) Lý Hoàng Nam; Erik Arutiunian (South Korea) Chung Yun-seong (Chinese Taipei) Huang Tsung-hao
July 15	Tianjin, China; Hard; M25; Singles and doubles draws	(Chinese Taipei) Huang Tsung-hao (New Zealand) Alexander Klintcharov; 6–3, 7–6^{(10–8)}	Erik Arutiunian; Aliaksandr Liaonenka	(Chinese Taipei) Hsu Yu-hsiou; Aliaksandr Liaonenka	(Vietnam) Lý Hoàng Nam; Erik Arutiunian (South Korea) Chung Yun-seong (Chinese Taipei) Huang Tsung-hao
July 15	Esch-sur-Alzette, Luxembourg; Clay; M25; Singles and doubles draws	(Luxembourg) Chris Rodesch; 6–1, 3–6, 6–4	(Belgium) Gauthier Onclin	(Argentina) Alejo Lorenzo Lingua Lavallén (Spain) Pol Martín Tiffon	(Belgium) Simon Beaupain (Germany) Marlon Vankan (Belgium) Alessio Basile (Belgium) Buvaysar Gadamauri
July 15	Esch-sur-Alzette, Luxembourg; Clay; M25; Singles and doubles draws	(Luxembourg) Raphael Calzi (France) Amaury Raynel; 4–6, 6–1, [10–6]	(Germany) Ruben Hartig (Germany) Luca Matteo Sobbe	(Argentina) Alejo Lorenzo Lingua Lavallén (Spain) Pol Martín Tiffon	(Belgium) Simon Beaupain (Germany) Marlon Vankan (Belgium) Alessio Basile (Belgium) Buvaysar Gadamauri
July 15	Castelo Branco, Portugal; Hard; M25; Singles and doubles draws	(Portugal) Frederico Ferreira Silva; 3–6, 6–4, 6–2	(Belgium) Michael Geerts	(Venezuela) Gonçalo Oliveira (Czech Republic) Marek Gengel	(Spain) Mario González Fernández (Spain) Rafael Izquierdo Luque (Italy) Michele Ribecai (Chile) Diego Fernández Flores
July 15	Castelo Branco, Portugal; Hard; M25; Singles and doubles draws	(Belgium) Michael Geerts (Czech Republic) Marek Gengel; 6–3, 6–3	(Estonia) Johannes Seeman (United States) Wally Thayne	(Venezuela) Gonçalo Oliveira (Czech Republic) Marek Gengel	(Spain) Mario González Fernández (Spain) Rafael Izquierdo Luque (Italy) Michele Ribecai (Chile) Diego Fernández Flores
July 15	Gandia, Spain; Clay; M25; Singles and doubles draws	(Spain) Carlos Sánchez Jover; 3–6, 6–2, 7–5	(Italy) Raúl Brancaccio	(United Kingdom) Oliver Crawford (Italy) Lorenzo Giustino	(Argentina) Lautaro Midón (Germany) Nicola Kuhn (Spain) Carlos López Montagud (United Kingdom) Felix Gill
July 15	Gandia, Spain; Clay; M25; Singles and doubles draws	(Spain) Diego Augusto Barreto Sánchez (Spain) Alejandro Manzanera Pertusa; 6–2, 6–1	(Chile) Ignacio Antonio Becerra Otárola (Chile) Miguel Ángel Cabrera	(United Kingdom) Oliver Crawford (Italy) Lorenzo Giustino	(Argentina) Lautaro Midón (Germany) Nicola Kuhn (Spain) Carlos López Montagud (United Kingdom) Felix Gill
July 15	Nottingham, United Kingdom; Hard; M25; Singles and doubles draws	(Australia) James McCabe; 6–0, 6–1	(United Kingdom) George Loffhagen	(United Kingdom) Max Basing (France) Lucas Poullain	(United States) Murphy Cassone (Australia) Blake Mott (United Kingdom) Hugo Coquelin (United Kingdom) Jack Pinnington Jones
July 15	Nottingham, United Kingdom; Hard; M25; Singles and doubles draws	(United Kingdom) James Davis (United Kingdom) Matthew Summers; 6–3, 6–4	(Australia) Joshua Charlton (Australia) Blake Ellis	(United Kingdom) Max Basing (France) Lucas Poullain	(United States) Murphy Cassone (Australia) Blake Mott (United Kingdom) Hugo Coquelin (United Kingdom) Jack Pinnington Jones
July 15	East Lansing, United States; Hard; M25; Singles and doubles draws	(United Kingdom) Johannus Monday; 6–2, 6–2	(United Kingdom) Aidan McHugh	(United States) Aidan Kim (United States) Kyle Kang	(United States) Ozan Baris (United States) Alexander Kotzen (United States) Joshua Sheehy (United States) Cannon Kingsley
July 15	East Lansing, United States; Hard; M25; Singles and doubles draws	(Antigua and Barbuda) Jody Maginley (United States) Joshua Sheehy; 7–5, 6–2	(United Kingdom) Ben Jones (Portugal) Duarte Vale	(United States) Aidan Kim (United States) Kyle Kang	(United States) Ozan Baris (United States) Alexander Kotzen (United States) Joshua Sheehy (United States) Cannon Kingsley
July 15	Bastia-Lucciana, France; Clay; M15; Singles and doubles draws	(France) Timo Legout; 7–6^{(7–4)}, 6–2	(France) Louis Dussin	(Italy) Jacopo Bilardo (France) Florent Bax	(Argentina) Hernán Casanova (France) Lucas Bouquet (France) Arthur Bonnaud (France) Maé Malige
July 15	Bastia-Lucciana, France; Clay; M15; Singles and doubles draws	(Mexico) Rodrigo Alujas (France) Charlie Camus; 6–2, 6–7^{(2–7)}, [10–8]	(Italy) Luca Parenti (Italy) Leonardo Taddia	(Italy) Jacopo Bilardo (France) Florent Bax	(Argentina) Hernán Casanova (France) Lucas Bouquet (France) Arthur Bonnaud (France) Maé Malige
July 15	Uslar, Germany; Clay; M15; Singles and doubles draws	(Germany) Justin Engel; 6–2, 6–4	(Argentina) Lautaro Agustín Falabella	(Germany) Elmar Ejupovic (Germany) Mika Petkovic	(Germany) Michel Hopp (Germany) Taym Al Azmeh (Germany) Maik Steiner (Brazil) Nicolas Zanellato
July 15	Uslar, Germany; Clay; M15; Singles and doubles draws	(Germany) André Steinbach (Germany) Aaron James Williams; 4–6, 6–3, [10–7]	(Argentina) Lautaro Agustn Falabella (Argentina) Lorenzo Joaquín Rodríguez	(Germany) Elmar Ejupovic (Germany) Mika Petkovic	(Germany) Michel Hopp (Germany) Taym Al Azmeh (Germany) Maik Steiner (Brazil) Nicolas Zanellato
July 15	Gubbio, Italy; Clay; M15; Singles and doubles draws	(Italy) Gabriele Pennaforti; 6–0, 6–2	(Italy) Samuele Pieri	(Italy) Alessandro Pecci (Croatia) Josip Šimundža	(Argentina) Valerio Aboian (Italy) Matteo De Vincentis (Italy) Facundo Juárez (Italy) Gabriele Maria Noce
July 15	Gubbio, Italy; Clay; M15; Singles and doubles draws	(Italy) Leonardo Malgaroli (Italy) Giulio Perego; 6–4, 6–3	(Italy) Alessandro Coccioli (Italy) Lorenzo Lorusso	(Italy) Alessandro Pecci (Croatia) Josip Šimundža	(Argentina) Valerio Aboian (Italy) Matteo De Vincentis (Italy) Facundo Juárez (Italy) Gabriele Maria Noce
July 15	Huamantla, Mexico; Hard; M15; Singles and doubles draws	(United States) Eric Hadigian; 6–3, 6–2	(Mexico) Alex Hernández	(Colombia) Johan Alexander Rodríguez (Japan) Kosuke Ogura	(Mexico) Alan Sau Franco (Mexico) Luis Carlos Álvarez Valdés (Mexico) Alan Kam (Italy) Lorenzo Claverie
July 15	Huamantla, Mexico; Hard; M15; Singles and doubles draws	(Colombia) Juan Sebastián Gómez (Colombia) Johan Alexander Rodríguez; 6–4, 6–7^{(3–7)}, [12–10]	(Mexico) Gerardo López Villaseñor (Mexico) Manuel Sánchez	(Colombia) Johan Alexander Rodríguez (Japan) Kosuke Ogura	(Mexico) Alan Sau Franco (Mexico) Luis Carlos Álvarez Valdés (Mexico) Alan Kam (Italy) Lorenzo Claverie
July 15	Bucharest, Romania; Clay; M15; Singles and doubles draws	(Uruguay) Franco Roncadelli; 2–6, 7–6^{(8–6)}, 6–3	(Romania) Dan Alexandru Tomescu	(France) Corentin Denolly (Romania) Radu David Țurcanu	(Estonia) Markus Mölder (Argentina) Luciano Emanuel Ambrogi (Romania) Nicholas David Ionel (Romania) Mihai Răzvan Marinescu
July 15	Bucharest, Romania; Clay; M15; Singles and doubles draws	(France) Corentin Denolly (Romania) Bogdan Pavel; 6–4, 6–2	(Romania) Ștefan Adrian Andreescu (Romania) Dragoș Nicolae Cazacu	(France) Corentin Denolly (Romania) Radu David Țurcanu	(Estonia) Markus Mölder (Argentina) Luciano Emanuel Ambrogi (Romania) Nicholas David Ionel (Romania) Mihai Răzvan Marinescu
July 15	Kuršumlijska Banja, Serbia; Clay; M15; Singles and doubles draws	(France) Luka Pavlovic; 6–3, 6–2	(Serbia) Dušan Obradović	(Serbia) Viktor Jović (Bosnia and Herzegovina) Andrej Nedić	(Serbia) Branko Đurić (Netherlands) Abel Forger (Argentina) Juan Pablo Paz (Denmark) Kane Bonsach Ganley
July 15	Kuršumlijska Banja, Serbia; Clay; M15; Singles and doubles draws	(Bulgaria) Dinko Dinev (Serbia) Stefan Latinović; 7–6^{(7–5)}, 5–7, [10–6]	(France) Paul Barbier Gazeu (France) Benjamin Pietri	(Serbia) Viktor Jović (Bosnia and Herzegovina) Andrej Nedić	(Serbia) Branko Đurić (Netherlands) Abel Forger (Argentina) Juan Pablo Paz (Denmark) Kane Bonsach Ganley
July 15	Slovenska Bistrica, Slovenia; Clay; M15; Singles and doubles draws	(Slovakia) Andrej Martin; 5–7, 6–4, 6–2	(United States) Felix Corwin	(Slovenia) Jan Kupčič (Finland) Eero Vasa	(Slovenia) Sebastian Dominko (Finland) Iiro Vasa (Switzerland) Adrian Bodmer (Slovenia) Matic Križnik
July 15	Slovenska Bistrica, Slovenia; Clay; M15; Singles and doubles draws	(Slovenia) Sebastian Dominko (Slovenia) Jan Kupčič; Walkover	(Egypt) Michael Bassem Sobhy (Egypt) Fares Zakaria	(Slovenia) Jan Kupčič (Finland) Eero Vasa	(Slovenia) Sebastian Dominko (Finland) Iiro Vasa (Switzerland) Adrian Bodmer (Slovenia) Matic Križnik
July 15	Nakhon Si Thammarat, Thailand; Hard; M15; Singles and doubles draws	(Thailand) Thanapet Chanta; 6–0, 7–5	(Thailand) Jirat Navasirisomboon	(Greece) Stefanos Sakellaridis (India) Vishnu Vardhan	(New Zealand) James Watt (Thailand) Pawit Sornlaksup (Israel) Ofek Shimanov (Israel) Amit Vales
July 15	Nakhon Si Thammarat, Thailand; Hard; M15; Singles and doubles draws	(Philippines) Francis Alcantara (Thailand) Maximus Jones; 2–6, 7–5, [10–8]	(India) Adil Kalyanpur (India) Vishnu Vardhan	(Greece) Stefanos Sakellaridis (India) Vishnu Vardhan	(New Zealand) James Watt (Thailand) Pawit Sornlaksup (Israel) Ofek Shimanov (Israel) Amit Vales
July 15	Monastir, Tunisia; Hard; M15; Singles and doubles draws	(Ivory Coast) Eliakim Coulibaly; 6–2, 6–2	(United States) Darwin Blanch	(France) Pablo Trochu (Bosnia and Herzegovina) Aldin Šetkić	Danil Panarin (Turkey) Mert Alkaya (Tunisia) Aziz Ouakaa (Morocco) Mehdi Benchakroun
July 15	Monastir, Tunisia; Hard; M15; Singles and doubles draws	(Malta) Alex Degabriele (Morocco) Younes Lalami Laaroussi; 6–4, 7–5	(France) Axel Garcian (France) Pablo Trochu	(France) Pablo Trochu (Bosnia and Herzegovina) Aldin Šetkić	Danil Panarin (Turkey) Mert Alkaya (Tunisia) Aziz Ouakaa (Morocco) Mehdi Benchakroun
July 15	Rochester, United States; Clay; M15; Singles and doubles draws	(United States) Alexander Bernard; 6–3, 6–1	(United States) Tyler Zink	(United States) Samir Banerjee (Canada) Benjamin Thomas George	(Northern Mariana Islands) Colin Sinclair (Canada) Alvin Nicholas Tudorica (United States) Loren Thomas Byers (Argentina) Matías Franco Descotte
July 15	Rochester, United States; Clay; M15; Singles and doubles draws	(United States) Alexander Bernard (United States) Tyler Zink; 7–6^{(7–0)}, 7–6^{(7–4)}	(United States) Benjamin Kittay (Australia) Lawrence Sciglitano	(United States) Samir Banerjee (Canada) Benjamin Thomas George	(Northern Mariana Islands) Colin Sinclair (Canada) Alvin Nicholas Tudorica (United States) Loren Thomas Byers (Argentina) Matías Franco Descotte
July 22	Kramsach, Austria; Clay; M25; Singles and doubles draws	(United States) Toby Kodat; 6–2, 6–7^{(5–7)}, 6–4	(France) Lilian Marmousez	(Germany) Peter Heller (Austria) Sebastian Sorger	(Germany) Louis Wessels (Italy) Gianmarco Ferrari (Czech Republic) David Poljak (Czech Republic) Martin Krumich
July 22	Kramsach, Austria; Clay; M25; Singles and doubles draws	(Germany) Tim Rühl (Germany) Patrick Zahraj; 3–6, 7–5, [10–8]	(Germany) Jannik Opitz (Germany) Maik Steiner	(Germany) Peter Heller (Austria) Sebastian Sorger	(Germany) Louis Wessels (Italy) Gianmarco Ferrari (Czech Republic) David Poljak (Czech Republic) Martin Krumich
July 22	Astana, Kazakhstan; Hard; M25; Singles and doubles draws	(Uzbekistan) Khumoyun Sultanov; 6–2, 6–4	(United States) Alafia Ayeni	(Slovakia) Lukáš Pokorný (Kazakhstan) Amir Omarkhanov	(Norway) Viktor Durasovic (Georgia (country)) Aleksandre Bakshi (India) S D Prajwal Dev (France) Antoine Ghibaudo
July 22	Astana, Kazakhstan; Hard; M25; Singles and doubles draws	Egor Agafonov; Ilia Simakin; 6–2, 6–4	(Kazakhstan) Grigoriy Lomakin (Georgia (country)) Zura Tkemaladze	(Slovakia) Lukáš Pokorný (Kazakhstan) Amir Omarkhanov	(Norway) Viktor Durasovic (Georgia (country)) Aleksandre Bakshi (India) S D Prajwal Dev (France) Antoine Ghibaudo
July 22	Porto, Portugal; Hard; M25; Singles and doubles draws	(Portugal) João Domingues; 6–4, 2–6, 6–4	(Portugal) Francisco Rocha	(Portugal) Diogo Marques (Portugal) Pedro Araújo	(Chile) Diego Fernández Flores (France) Tom Paris (Portugal) Vasco Leote Prata (France) Lucas Poullain
July 22	Porto, Portugal; Hard; M25; Singles and doubles draws	(Estonia) Johannes Seeman (United States) Wally Thayne; 6–3, 6–1	(Australia) Ethan Cook (Bulgaria) Nikolay Nedelchev	(Portugal) Diogo Marques (Portugal) Pedro Araújo	(Chile) Diego Fernández Flores (France) Tom Paris (Portugal) Vasco Leote Prata (France) Lucas Poullain
July 22	Bacău, Romania; Hard; M25; Singles and doubles draws	(Spain) Àlex Martí Pujolràs; 3–6, 7–6^{(10–8)}, 6–4	(Romania) Cezar Crețu	Mikalai Haliak (Uruguay) Franco Roncadelli	(Romania) Radu Mihai Papoe (Romania) Luca Preda (Italy) Gabriele Pennaforti (Moldova) Ilya Snițari
July 22	Bacău, Romania; Hard; M25; Singles and doubles draws	(Uruguay) Franco Roncadelli (Brazil) Paulo André Saraiva dos Santos; 6–4, 6–4	(Romania) Bogdan Pavel (Moldova) Ilya Snițari	Mikalai Haliak (Uruguay) Franco Roncadelli	(Romania) Radu Mihai Papoe (Romania) Luca Preda (Italy) Gabriele Pennaforti (Moldova) Ilya Snițari
July 22	Dénia, Spain; Clay; M25; Singles and doubles draws	(Spain) Pol Martín Tiffon; 6–2, 4–6, 6–3	(Spain) Rafael Jódar	(Italy) Raúl Brancaccio (Spain) Alejandro Manzanera Pertusa	(Argentina) Lautaro Midón (Italy) Lorenzo Giustino (Spain) Carlos Sánchez Jover (United Kingdom) Felix Gill
July 22	Dénia, Spain; Clay; M25; Singles and doubles draws	(Spain) Mikel Martínez (Spain) Alejandro Turriziani Álvarez; 6–1, 6–4	(Spain) Mario Mansilla Díez (Spain) Álvaro Peiró Serrano	(Italy) Raúl Brancaccio (Spain) Alejandro Manzanera Pertusa	(Argentina) Lautaro Midón (Italy) Lorenzo Giustino (Spain) Carlos Sánchez Jover (United Kingdom) Felix Gill
July 22	Champaign, United States; Hard; M25; Singles and doubles draws	(United States) Colton Smith; 6–4, 6–3	(United States) Andre Ilagan	(United States) Cannon Kingsley (United States) Harrison Adams	(United Kingdom) Aidan McHugh (United States) Noah Schachter (United States) Gavin Young (Japan) Kenta Miyoshi
July 22	Champaign, United States; Hard; M25; Singles and doubles draws	(Canada) Cleeve Harper (United States) Tyler Zink; 6–4, 6–4	(United States) Cannon Kingsley (United States) Preston Stearns	(United States) Cannon Kingsley (United States) Harrison Adams	(United Kingdom) Aidan McHugh (United States) Noah Schachter (United States) Gavin Young (Japan) Kenta Miyoshi
July 22	Rognac, France; Hard; M15; Singles and doubles draws	(Italy) Leonardo Rossi; 6–0, 7–5	(France) Timo Legout	(France) Alexandre Reco (France) Alexandre Aubriot	(France) Nicolas Jadoun (France) Damien Salvestre (France) Mikail Alimli (France) Yanis Ghazouani Durand
July 22	Rognac, France; Hard; M15; Singles and doubles draws	(France) Yanis Ghazouani Durand (France) Loann Massard; 6–4, 6–4	(France) Robin Catry (France) Jules Leroux	(France) Alexandre Reco (France) Alexandre Aubriot	(France) Nicolas Jadoun (France) Damien Salvestre (France) Mikail Alimli (France) Yanis Ghazouani Durand
July 22	Metzingen, Germany; Clay; M15; Singles and doubles draws	(Germany) Florian Broska; 7–5, 6–2	(Syria) Hazem Naw	(France) Théo Papamalamis; Ivan Nedelko	(France) Maxence Rivet (France) Antoine Walch (France) Arthur Nagel (Germany) Justin Schlageter
July 22	Metzingen, Germany; Clay; M15; Singles and doubles draws	(Netherlands) Mees Röttgering (Netherlands) Fons van Sambeek; 6–4, 6–2	(France) Arthur Nagel (France) Antoine Walch	(France) Théo Papamalamis; Ivan Nedelko	(France) Maxence Rivet (France) Antoine Walch (France) Arthur Nagel (Germany) Justin Schlageter
July 22	Perugia, Italy; Clay; M15; Singles and doubles draws	(Italy) Facundo Juárez; 6–4, 6–4	(Italy) Gianluca Cadenasso	(Argentina) Luciano Emanuel Ambrogi (Italy) Alessandro Spadola	(Italy) Federico Cinà (Italy) Leonardo Malgaroli (Italy) Matteo De Vincentis (Italy) Tomas Gerini
July 22	Perugia, Italy; Clay; M15; Singles and doubles draws	(Italy) Jacopo Bilardo (Italy) Gianluca Cadenasso; 6–3, 6–1	(Italy) Lorenzo Lorusso (Italy) Felipe Virgili Berini	(Argentina) Luciano Emanuel Ambrogi (Italy) Alessandro Spadola	(Italy) Federico Cinà (Italy) Leonardo Malgaroli (Italy) Matteo De Vincentis (Italy) Tomas Gerini
July 22	Huamantla, Mexico; Hard; M15; Singles and doubles draws	(Dominican Republic) Peter Bertran; 6–4, 6–3	(Colombia) Juan Sebastián Gómez	(Mexico) Alan Fernando Rubio Fierros (Mexico) Alex Hernández	(United States) Jacob Brumm (Colombia) Johan Alexander Rodríguez (Italy) Lorenzo Claverie (Mexico) Luis Carlos Álvarez Valdés
July 22	Huamantla, Mexico; Hard; M15; Singles and doubles draws	(Colombia) Juan Sebastián Gómez (Colombia) Johan Alexander Rodríguez; 4–6, 6–2, [10–6]	(Mexico) Daniel Moreno (Mexico) Alan Fernando Rubio Fierros	(Mexico) Alan Fernando Rubio Fierros (Mexico) Alex Hernández	(United States) Jacob Brumm (Colombia) Johan Alexander Rodríguez (Italy) Lorenzo Claverie (Mexico) Luis Carlos Álvarez Valdés
July 22	Kuršumlijska Banja, Serbia; Clay; M15; Singles and doubles draws	Marat Sharipov; 6–1, 6–2	(Denmark) Kane Bonsach Ganley	(Argentina) Juan Manuel La Serna (Turkey) Mert Naci Türker	(Bosnia and Herzegovina) Andrej Nedić (Greece) Ioannis Xilas (Italy) Federico Bondioli (Serbia) Dušan Obradović
July 22	Kuršumlijska Banja, Serbia; Clay; M15; Singles and doubles draws	(Argentina) Leonardo Aboian (Argentina) Lautaro Agustín Falabella; 6–4, 2–6, [10–6]	(Serbia) Stefan Latinović; Marat Sharipov	(Argentina) Juan Manuel La Serna (Turkey) Mert Naci Türker	(Bosnia and Herzegovina) Andrej Nedić (Greece) Ioannis Xilas (Italy) Federico Bondioli (Serbia) Dušan Obradović
July 22	Poprad, Slovakia; Clay; M15; Singles and doubles draws	(Czech Republic) Jakub Filip; 6–1, 6–2	(Slovakia) Andrej Martin	(Slovakia) Miloš Karol (Hungary) Gergely Madarász	(Czech Republic) Dominik Kellovský (Slovakia) Tomáš Lánik (Slovakia) Samuel Puškár (Romania) Ștefan Paloși
July 22	Poprad, Slovakia; Clay; M15; Singles and doubles draws	(Czech Republic) Petr Brunclík (Czech Republic) Jakub Filip; 6–4, 6–4	(Slovakia) Miloš Karol (Slovakia) Tomáš Lánik	(Slovakia) Miloš Karol (Hungary) Gergely Madarász	(Czech Republic) Dominik Kellovský (Slovakia) Tomáš Lánik (Slovakia) Samuel Puškár (Romania) Ștefan Paloși
July 22	Monastir, Tunisia; Hard; M15; Singles and doubles draws	(Italy) Massimo Giunta; 6–3, 4–6, 6–0	(Ukraine) Yurii Dzhavakian	(Tunisia) Aziz Ouakaa (Australia) Chen Dong	(Italy) Luca Fantini (South Africa) Devin Badenhorst (Algeria) Samir Hamza Reguig (France) Axel Garcian
July 22	Monastir, Tunisia; Hard; M15; Singles and doubles draws	(South Africa) Devin Badenhorst (United Kingdom) Luc Koenig; 6–4, 6–0	(Italy) Massimo Giunta (Morocco) Younes Lalami Laaroussi	(Tunisia) Aziz Ouakaa (Australia) Chen Dong	(Italy) Luca Fantini (South Africa) Devin Badenhorst (Algeria) Samir Hamza Reguig (France) Axel Garcian
July 29	Brazzaville, Congo; Clay; M25; Singles and doubles draws	(Venezuela) Gonçalo Oliveira; 6–4, 6–2	(Slovenia) Bor Artnak	(Ukraine) Eric Vanshelboim (France) Mathys Erhard	(India) Karan Singh (United States) Aayush Bhat (India) Rishab Agarwal (India) S D Prajwal Dev
July 29	Brazzaville, Congo; Clay; M25; Singles and doubles draws	(India) S D Prajwal Dev (India) Adil Kalyanpur; 7–5, 6–2	(India) Dev Javia (India) Rishi Reddy	(Ukraine) Eric Vanshelboim (France) Mathys Erhard	(India) Karan Singh (United States) Aayush Bhat (India) Rishab Agarwal (India) S D Prajwal Dev
July 29	Wetzlar, Germany; Clay; M25; Singles and doubles draws	(Netherlands) Max Houkes; 6–4, 7–5	(France) Maxime Chazal	(Netherlands) Mees Röttgering (Germany) Christoph Negritu	(Poland) Daniel Michalski (Germany) Elmar Ejupovic (Germany) Alessio Vazquez Gehrke (Germany) Florian Broska
July 29	Wetzlar, Germany; Clay; M25; Singles and doubles draws	(Germany) Florian Broska (Austria) Gregor Ramskogler; 7–5, 6–4	(Greece) Dimitris Sakellaridis (Greece) Michalis Sakellaridis	(Netherlands) Mees Röttgering (Germany) Christoph Negritu	(Poland) Daniel Michalski (Germany) Elmar Ejupovic (Germany) Alessio Vazquez Gehrke (Germany) Florian Broska
July 29	Bolzano, Italy; Clay; M25; Singles and doubles draws	(Italy) Jacopo Berrettini; 6–1, 6–3	(Italy) Gianmarco Ferrari	(Argentina) Luciano Emanuel Ambrogi (France) Lilian Marmousez	(Italy) Leonardo Malgaroli (Italy) Mariano Tammaro (Italy) Filippo Speziali (Italy) Federico Gaio
July 29	Bolzano, Italy; Clay; M25; Singles and doubles draws	(France) Lilian Marmousez (Ukraine) Oleksandr Ovcharenko; 6–2, 6–1	(Argentina) Luciano Emanuel Ambrogi (Italy) Davide Cortimiglia	(Argentina) Luciano Emanuel Ambrogi (France) Lilian Marmousez	(Italy) Leonardo Malgaroli (Italy) Mariano Tammaro (Italy) Filippo Speziali (Italy) Federico Gaio
July 29	Pitești, Romania; Hard; M25; Singles and doubles draws	(Uruguay) Franco Roncadelli; 5–7, 6–1, 6–2	(Spain) Àlex Martí Pujolràs	(Romania) Nicholas David Ionel (Romania) Ștefan Paloși	(United Kingdom) Oliver Crawford (Argentina) Leonardo Aboian (Romania) Gabi Adrian Boitan (Romania) Gabriel Ghețu
July 29	Pitești, Romania; Hard; M25; Singles and doubles draws	(Brazil) Paulo André Saraiva dos Santos (Brazil) Rafael Tosetto; 7–5, 5–7, [10–7]	(Czech Republic) Jan Jermář (Slovakia) Igor Zelenay	(Romania) Nicholas David Ionel (Romania) Ștefan Paloși	(United Kingdom) Oliver Crawford (Argentina) Leonardo Aboian (Romania) Gabi Adrian Boitan (Romania) Gabriel Ghețu
July 29	Taipei, Taiwan; Hard; M25; Singles and doubles draws	(Japan) Keisuke Saitoh; 6–3, 6–1	(Chinese Taipei) Hsu Yu-hsiou	(India) Mukund Sasikumar (Japan) Ryotaro Taguchi	(Czech Republic) Dominik Palán (France) Arthur Weber (Japan) Takuya Kumasaka (Chinese Taipei) Huang Tsung-hao
July 29	Taipei, Taiwan; Hard; M25; Singles and doubles draws	(Thailand) Pruchya Isaro (Indonesia) Christopher Rungkat; 7–6^{(7–4)}, 6–4	(Chinese Taipei) Ray Ho (South Korea) Shin Woo-bin	(India) Mukund Sasikumar (Japan) Ryotaro Taguchi	(Czech Republic) Dominik Palán (France) Arthur Weber (Japan) Takuya Kumasaka (Chinese Taipei) Huang Tsung-hao
July 29	Roehampton, United Kingdom; Hard; M25; Singles and doubles draws	(United Kingdom) George Loffhagen; 6–4, 6–3	(Norway) Viktor Durasovic	(Australia) Blake Mott (Netherlands) Alec Deckers	(United Kingdom) Johannus Monday (United States) Murphy Cassone (United Kingdom) Luke Simkiss (United Kingdom) Ben Jones
July 29	Roehampton, United Kingdom; Hard; M25; Singles and doubles draws	(Australia) Joshua Charlton (United Kingdom) Harry Wendelken; 3–6, 7–6^{(7–1)}, [11–9]	(Norway) Viktor Durasovic (Norway) Lukas Hellum Lilleengen	(Australia) Blake Mott (Netherlands) Alec Deckers	(United Kingdom) Johannus Monday (United States) Murphy Cassone (United Kingdom) Luke Simkiss (United Kingdom) Ben Jones
July 29	Edwardsville, United States; Hard; M25; Singles and doubles draws	(United States) Gavin Young; 6–4, 6–3	(United States) Kyle Kang	(United States) Adam Neff (Northern Mariana Islands) Colin Sinclair	(United States) Andres Martin (Japan) Kenta Miyoshi (United States) Michael Zheng (United States) Nicolas Ian Kotzen
July 29	Edwardsville, United States; Hard; M25; Singles and doubles draws	(United States) Felix Corwin (United States) Nathan Ponwith; 7–6^{(8–6)}, 2–6, [10–5]	(United States) Lucas Horve (United Kingdom) Oliver Okonkwo	(United States) Adam Neff (Northern Mariana Islands) Colin Sinclair	(United States) Andres Martin (Japan) Kenta Miyoshi (United States) Michael Zheng (United States) Nicolas Ian Kotzen
July 29	Huamantla, Mexico; Hard; M15; Singles and doubles draws	(Dominican Republic) Peter Bertran; 6–3, 7–5	(Brazil) Eduardo Ribeiro	(Japan) Kosuke Ogura (United States) Mwendwa Mbithi	(United States) Jacob Brumm (Colombia) Johan Alexander Rodríguez (Mexico) Alan Fernando Rubio Fierros (Mexico) Alex Hernández
July 29	Huamantla, Mexico; Hard; M15; Singles and doubles draws	(Mexico) Daniel Moreno (Mexico) Alan Fernando Rubio Fierros; 7–5, 6–4	(Venezuela) Juan José Bianchi (Venezuela) Brandon Pérez	(Japan) Kosuke Ogura (United States) Mwendwa Mbithi	(United States) Jacob Brumm (Colombia) Johan Alexander Rodríguez (Mexico) Alan Fernando Rubio Fierros (Mexico) Alex Hernández
July 29	Kuršumlijska Banja, Serbia; Clay; M15; Singles and doubles draws	(Argentina) Juan Manuel La Serna; 6–2, 6–4	(Greece) Aristotelis Thanos	(France) Louis Tessa (France) Amaury Raynel	(Serbia) Zoran Ludoški (North Macedonia) Gorazd Srbljak (Germany) Lambert Ruland (Argentina) Lautaro Agustín Falabella
July 29	Kuršumlijska Banja, Serbia; Clay; M15; Singles and doubles draws	(Croatia) Admir Kalender; Pavel Verbin; 6–4, 6–4	(Serbia) Vuk Rađenović (Greece) Aristotelis Thanos	(France) Louis Tessa (France) Amaury Raynel	(Serbia) Zoran Ludoški (North Macedonia) Gorazd Srbljak (Germany) Lambert Ruland (Argentina) Lautaro Agustín Falabella
July 29	Xàtiva, Spain; Clay; M15; Singles and doubles draws	(Venezuela) Ignacio Parisca; 7–6^{(8–6)}, 6–2	(Spain) Imanol López Morillo	(Spain) Mario Martínez Serrano (Spain) Nicolás Álvarez Varona	(Nigeria) Christopher Bulus (Denmark) Philip Hjorth (Italy) Iannis Miletich (Spain) John Echeverría
July 29	Xàtiva, Spain; Clay; M15; Singles and doubles draws	(Italy) Lorenzo Sciahbasi (Italy) Gabriele Vulpitta; 7–6^{(7–5)}, 6–3	(United States) Alexander Bravo (Spain) Sergi Pérez Contri	(Spain) Mario Martínez Serrano (Spain) Nicolás Álvarez Varona	(Nigeria) Christopher Bulus (Denmark) Philip Hjorth (Italy) Iannis Miletich (Spain) John Echeverría
July 29	Monastir, Tunisia; Hard; M15; Singles and doubles draws	(Algeria) Samir Hamza Reguig; 2–6, 6–4, 6–4	(France) Étienne Donnet	(Japan) Shinji Hazawa (Italy) Massimo Giunta	(France) César Bouchelaghem (South Africa) Devin Badenhorst (France) Thomas Deschamps (Australia) Jacob Bradshaw
July 29	Monastir, Tunisia; Hard; M15; Singles and doubles draws	(Argentina) Nikos Lehmann; Danil Panarin; 7–6^{(8–6)}, 6–4	(Portugal) Valentin de Carvalho (Bulgaria) Anthony Genov	(Japan) Shinji Hazawa (Italy) Massimo Giunta	(France) César Bouchelaghem (South Africa) Devin Badenhorst (France) Thomas Deschamps (Australia) Jacob Bradshaw

=== August ===
Week of	Tournament	Winner	Runners-up	Semifinalists	Quarterfinalists
August 5	Brazzaville, Congo; Clay; M25; Singles and doubles draws	(France) Mathys Erhard; 6–2, 7–5	(Venezuela) Gonçalo Oliveira	(Slovenia) Bor Artnak (India) Dev Javia	(India) Yuvan Nandal (India) Adil Kalyanpur (India) Karan Singh (India) S D Prajwal Dev
August 5	Brazzaville, Congo; Clay; M25; Singles and doubles draws	(India) S D Prajwal Dev (India) Adil Kalyanpur; 7–6^{(7–3)}, 7–5	(United States) Dhruva Mulye (Venezuela) Gonçalo Oliveira	(Slovenia) Bor Artnak (India) Dev Javia	(India) Yuvan Nandal (India) Adil Kalyanpur (India) Karan Singh (India) S D Prajwal Dev
August 5	Montesilvano, Italy; Clay; M25; Singles and doubles draws	(Spain) Carlos Sánchez Jover; 6–4, 6–3	(Italy) Gabriele Pennaforti	(Ukraine) Oleksandr Ovcharenko (Spain) Pol Martín Tiffon	(Brazil) João Eduardo Schiessl (Australia) Matthew Dellavedova; Alexey Vatutin (Tunisia) Moez Echargui
August 5	Montesilvano, Italy; Clay; M25; Singles and doubles draws	(Italy) Simone Agostini (Italy) Gianluca Cadenasso; 7–6^{(7–1)}, 6–2	(Italy) Lorenzo Rottoli (Italy) Mariano Tammaro	(Ukraine) Oleksandr Ovcharenko (Spain) Pol Martín Tiffon	(Brazil) João Eduardo Schiessl (Australia) Matthew Dellavedova; Alexey Vatutin (Tunisia) Moez Echargui
August 5	Taipei, Taiwan; Hard; M25; Singles and doubles draws	(Chinese Taipei) Hsu Yu-hsiou; 6–3, 6–4	(Australia) Blake Ellis	(South Korea) Shin Woo-bin (India) Mukund Sasikumar	(Japan) Makoto Ochi (Chinese Taipei) Huang Tsung-hao (Japan) Kokoro Isomura (Thailand) Wishaya Trongcharoenchaikul
August 5	Taipei, Taiwan; Hard; M25; Singles and doubles draws	(Thailand) Pruchya Isaro (Indonesia) Christopher Rungkat; 7–6^{(7–4)}, 7–5	(India) Sai Karteek Reddy Ganta (Thailand) Wishaya Trongcharoenchaikul	(South Korea) Shin Woo-bin (India) Mukund Sasikumar	(Japan) Makoto Ochi (Chinese Taipei) Huang Tsung-hao (Japan) Kokoro Isomura (Thailand) Wishaya Trongcharoenchaikul
August 5	Roehampton, United Kingdom; Hard; M25; Singles and doubles draws	(Australia) James McCabe; 7–5, 4–6, 6–3	(Japan) Masamichi Imamura	(France) Sascha Gueymard Wayenburg (United Kingdom) Arthur Fery	(United Kingdom) Luke Simkiss (United Kingdom) Ryan Peniston (United Kingdom) Emile Hudd (United Kingdom) Johannus Monday
August 5	Roehampton, United Kingdom; Hard; M25; Singles and doubles draws	(United Kingdom) Tom Hands (United Kingdom) Harry Wendelken; 6–3, 6–4	(United Kingdom) Liam Hignett (United Kingdom) James MacKinlay	(France) Sascha Gueymard Wayenburg (United Kingdom) Arthur Fery	(United Kingdom) Luke Simkiss (United Kingdom) Ryan Peniston (United Kingdom) Emile Hudd (United Kingdom) Johannus Monday
August 5	Southaven, United States; Hard; M25; Singles and doubles draws	(United States) Michael Zheng; 6–4, 7–6^{(7–3)}	(United States) Tyler Zink	(United States) Kyle Kang (United States) Andres Martin	(United States) Alexander Kotzen (United States) Andre Ilagan (Japan) Leo Vithoontien (Japan) Kenta Miyoshi
August 5	Southaven, United States; Hard; M25; Singles and doubles draws	(United Kingdom) Lui Maxted (United States) Michael Zheng; 6–2, 6–4	(United States) Keshav Chopra (United States) Andres Martin	(United States) Kyle Kang (United States) Andres Martin	(United States) Alexander Kotzen (United States) Andre Ilagan (Japan) Leo Vithoontien (Japan) Kenta Miyoshi
August 5	Eupen, Belgium; Clay; M15; Singles and doubles draws	(Belgium) Jack Logé; 6–2, 7–5	(Netherlands) Sidané Pontjodikromo	(Germany) Elmar Ejupovic (Germany) Mariano Dedura-Palomero	(Ukraine) Oleksii Krutykh (Denmark) Philip Hjorth (Belgium) Simon Beaupain (Austria) Sebastian Sorger
August 5	Eupen, Belgium; Clay; M15; Singles and doubles draws	(France) Arthur Nagel (France) Maxence Rivet; 4–6, 6–4, [10–7]	(Belgium) Alessio Basile (Belgium) Noah Merre	(Germany) Elmar Ejupovic (Germany) Mariano Dedura-Palomero	(Ukraine) Oleksii Krutykh (Denmark) Philip Hjorth (Belgium) Simon Beaupain (Austria) Sebastian Sorger
August 5	Vaasa, Finland; Hard; M15; Singles and doubles draws	(Canada) Alvin Nicholas Tudorica; 6–2, 6–3	(France) Guillaume Dalmasso	(Finland) Eero Vasa (Nigeria) Christopher Bulus	(France) Robin Catry (Finland) Patrick Kaukovalta (Sweden) William Rejchtman Vinciguerra (Switzerland) Timofey Stepanov
August 5	Vaasa, Finland; Hard; M15; Singles and doubles draws	(Sweden) Erik Grevelius (Sweden) Adam Heinonen; 7–6^{(7–3)}, 6–4	(Finland) Patrick Kaukovalta (Poland) Szymon Kielan	(Finland) Eero Vasa (Nigeria) Christopher Bulus	(France) Robin Catry (Finland) Patrick Kaukovalta (Sweden) William Rejchtman Vinciguerra (Switzerland) Timofey Stepanov
August 5	Dublin, Ireland; Carpet; M15; Singles and doubles draws	(United Kingdom) Ben Jones; 6–4, 7–6^{(7–5)}	(Poland) Filip Pieczonka	(Netherlands) Brian Bozemoj (United Kingdom) Ewen Lumsden	(Republic of Ireland) Conor Gannon (United Kingdom) Finn Bass (Italy) Michele Ribecai (United Kingdom) Marcus Walters
August 5	Dublin, Ireland; Carpet; M15; Singles and doubles draws	(Australia) Joshua Charlton (United Kingdom) Ben Jones; 6–3, 6–1	(United Kingdom) Adam Jones (Poland) Filip Pieczonka	(Netherlands) Brian Bozemoj (United Kingdom) Ewen Lumsden	(Republic of Ireland) Conor Gannon (United Kingdom) Finn Bass (Italy) Michele Ribecai (United Kingdom) Marcus Walters
August 5	Curtea de Argeș, Romania; Clay; M15; Singles and doubles draws	(Romania) Radu Mihai Papoe; 6–1, 6–0	(Romania) Ștefan Adrian Andreescu	(Czech Republic) Matyáš Černý (Italy) Francesco Ferrari	(Brazil) Rafael Tosetto (Romania) Mihai Răzvan Marinescu (France) Rayane Oumaouche (Italy) Giannicola Misasi
August 5	Curtea de Argeș, Romania; Clay; M15; Singles and doubles draws	(Argentina) Valentín Basel (Argentina) Franco Ribero; 6–2, 6–2	(Italy) Francesco Ferrari (Italy) Federico Valle	(Czech Republic) Matyáš Černý (Italy) Francesco Ferrari	(Brazil) Rafael Tosetto (Romania) Mihai Răzvan Marinescu (France) Rayane Oumaouche (Italy) Giannicola Misasi
August 5	Kuršumlijska Banja, Serbia; Clay; M15; Singles and doubles draws	(Greece) Aristotelis Thanos; 7–6^{(7–5)}, 6–2	(Italy) Tommaso Compagnucci	(Hungary) Péter Fajta (Serbia) Vuk Rađenović	(Germany) Jeremy Schifris (Italy) Juan Cruz Martin Manzano (Argentina) Lautaro Agustín Falabella (Argentina) Fernando Cavallo
August 5	Kuršumlijska Banja, Serbia; Clay; M15; Singles and doubles draws	Kirill Mishkin; Vitali Shvets; 6–4, 3–6, [10–8]	(Croatia) Admir Kalender; Pavel Verbin	(Hungary) Péter Fajta (Serbia) Vuk Rađenović	(Germany) Jeremy Schifris (Italy) Juan Cruz Martin Manzano (Argentina) Lautaro Agustín Falabella (Argentina) Fernando Cavallo
August 5	Tauste, Spain; Hard; M15; Singles and doubles draws	(Argentina) Julio César Porras; 5–7, 6–1, 6–3	(Italy) Fabrizio Andaloro	(Spain) John Echeverría (Spain) Alejo Sánchez Quílez	(Spain) Albert Pedrico Kravtsov (Spain) Carles Hernández (Spain) Mario González Fernández (Chile) Diego Fernández Flores
August 5	Tauste, Spain; Hard; M15; Singles and doubles draws	Timofei Derepasko (Japan) Naoya Honda; 7–5, 6–4	(Spain) Iñaki Montes de la Torre (United States) William Woodall	(Spain) John Echeverría (Spain) Alejo Sánchez Quílez	(Spain) Albert Pedrico Kravtsov (Spain) Carles Hernández (Spain) Mario González Fernández (Chile) Diego Fernández Flores
August 5	Monastir, Tunisia; Hard; M15; Singles and doubles draws	(United Kingdom) Oliver Tarvet; 6–7^{(4–7)}, 6–4, 6–1	(Ivory Coast) Eliakim Coulibaly	Savva Polukhin (Czech Republic) Petr Brunclík	(Senegal) Seydina André (Colombia) Adrià Soriano Barrera (Jordan) Zaid Mashni (France) Mathieu Scaglia
August 5	Monastir, Tunisia; Hard; M15; Singles and doubles draws	(Jordan) Mohammad Alkotop (Jordan) Mousa Alkotop; 6–4, 6–2	(Czech Republic) Petr Brunclík (Czech Republic) Victor Sklenka	Savva Polukhin (Czech Republic) Petr Brunclík	(Senegal) Seydina André (Colombia) Adrià Soriano Barrera (Jordan) Zaid Mashni (France) Mathieu Scaglia
August 12	Koksijde, Belgium; Clay; M25; Singles and doubles draws	(Belgium) Raphaël Collignon; 7–6^{(7–4)}, 6–1	(Netherlands) Guy den Ouden	(France) Lilian Marmousez (Belgium) Alexander Blockx	Alexey Vatutin (Tunisia) Moez Echargui (Belgium) Gilles-Arnaud Bailly (Germany) Tom Gentzsch
August 12	Koksijde, Belgium; Clay; M25; Singles and doubles draws	(Germany) Tom Gentzsch; Alexey Vatutin; 6–3, 6–4	(Belgium) Alessio Basile (Belgium) Noah Merre	(France) Lilian Marmousez (Belgium) Alexander Blockx	Alexey Vatutin (Tunisia) Moez Echargui (Belgium) Gilles-Arnaud Bailly (Germany) Tom Gentzsch
August 12	Londrina, Brazil; Clay; M25; Singles and doubles draws	(Brazil) Karue Sell; 6–4, 6–4	(Brazil) José Pereira	(Argentina) Ignacio Monzón (Brazil) Wilson Leite	(Brazil) Daniel Dutra da Silva (Brazil) Ryan Augusto dos Santos (Brazil) Igor Gimenez (Argentina) Juan Estévez
August 12	Londrina, Brazil; Clay; M25; Singles and doubles draws	(Brazil) Eduardo Ribeiro (Brazil) Gabriel Roveri Sidney; 6–4, 6–3	(Brazil) Igor Gimenez (Brazil) Fernando Yamacita	(Argentina) Ignacio Monzón (Brazil) Wilson Leite	(Brazil) Daniel Dutra da Silva (Brazil) Ryan Augusto dos Santos (Brazil) Igor Gimenez (Argentina) Juan Estévez
August 12	Yinchuan, China; Hard; M25; Singles and doubles draws	(China) Bai Yan; 6–4, 7–6^{(7–1)}	(China) Sun Fajing	(South Africa) Philip Henning (Greece) Stefanos Sakellaridis	(New Zealand) Ajeet Rai (China) Fnu Nidunjianzan (China) Zeng Yaojie (China) Cui Jie
August 12	Yinchuan, China; Hard; M25; Singles and doubles draws	(New Zealand) Ajeet Rai (China) Wang Aoran; 6–4, 6–4	(South Africa) Philip Henning (South Africa) Kris van Wyk	(South Africa) Philip Henning (Greece) Stefanos Sakellaridis	(New Zealand) Ajeet Rai (China) Fnu Nidunjianzan (China) Zeng Yaojie (China) Cui Jie
August 12	Arequipa, Peru; Clay; M25; Singles and doubles draws	(Chile) Matías Soto; 6–0, 7–6^{(7–2)}	(Argentina) Guido Iván Justo	(Argentina) Tomás Farjat (Zimbabwe) Benjamin Lock	(United States) Noah Schachter (Brazil) Mateo Barreiros Reyes (Colombia) Johan Alexander Rodríguez (United States) Mwendwa Mbithi
August 12	Arequipa, Peru; Clay; M25; Singles and doubles draws	(Chile) Matías Soto (Colombia) Andrés Urrea; 6–3, 7–6^{(7–4)}	(United States) Pranav Kumar (United States) Noah Schachter	(Argentina) Tomás Farjat (Zimbabwe) Benjamin Lock	(United States) Noah Schachter (Brazil) Mateo Barreiros Reyes (Colombia) Johan Alexander Rodríguez (United States) Mwendwa Mbithi
August 12	Idanha-a-Nova, Portugal; Hard; M25; Singles and doubles draws	(Uzbekistan) Khumoyun Sultanov; 6–4, 7–5	(Lithuania) Edas Butvilas	(France) Dan Added (United States) Karl Poling	(Spain) Mario González Fernández (Spain) Rafael Izquierdo Luque (Portugal) Duarte Vale (United States) Maxwell McKennon
August 12	Idanha-a-Nova, Portugal; Hard; M25; Singles and doubles draws	(Spain) Rafael Izquierdo Luque (Spain) Iván Marrero Curbelo; 6–2, 6–3	(France) Dan Added (Luxembourg) Alex Knaff	(France) Dan Added (United States) Karl Poling	(Spain) Mario González Fernández (Spain) Rafael Izquierdo Luque (Portugal) Duarte Vale (United States) Maxwell McKennon
August 12	Maribor, Slovenia; Clay; M25; Singles and doubles draws	(Croatia) Mili Poljičak; 6–4, 6–2	(Slovenia) Filip Jeff Planinšek	(Slovenia) Bor Artnak (Brazil) Matheus Pucinelli de Almeida	(Czech Republic) David Poljak; Ivan Gakhov (Slovenia) Blaž Rola (Slovenia) Sebastian Dominko
August 12	Maribor, Slovenia; Clay; M25; Singles and doubles draws	(Czech Republic) Filip Duda (Czech Republic) David Poljak; 6–3, 6–4	(Italy) Matteo Fondriest (Ukraine) Oleksandr Ovcharenko	(Slovenia) Bor Artnak (Brazil) Matheus Pucinelli de Almeida	(Czech Republic) David Poljak; Ivan Gakhov (Slovenia) Blaž Rola (Slovenia) Sebastian Dominko
August 12	Muttenz, Switzerland; Clay; M25; Singles and doubles draws	(Switzerland) Mika Brunold; 7–5, 6–4	Marat Sharipov	(Bulgaria) Petr Nesterov (Italy) Alexander Weis	(Denmark) Elmer Møller (Germany) Christoph Negritu (Switzerland) Jeffrey von der Schulenburg (Switzerland) Gian Grünig
August 12	Muttenz, Switzerland; Clay; M25; Singles and doubles draws	(Switzerland) Jakub Paul (Czech Republic) Matěj Vocel; 6–4, 6–2	(Switzerland) Johan Nikles (Switzerland) Damien Wenger	(Bulgaria) Petr Nesterov (Italy) Alexander Weis	(Denmark) Elmer Møller (Germany) Christoph Negritu (Switzerland) Jeffrey von der Schulenburg (Switzerland) Gian Grünig
August 12	Aldershot, United Kingdom; Hard; M25; Singles and doubles draws	(United Kingdom) Jack Pinnington Jones; 6–0, 7–6^{(7–3)}	(United States) Murphy Cassone	(Australia) Blake Mott (United Kingdom) Anton Matusevich	(United Kingdom) Johannus Monday (France) Sascha Gueymard Wayenburg (Japan) Masamichi Imamura (United Kingdom) Toby Martin
August 12	Aldershot, United Kingdom; Hard; M25; Singles and doubles draws	(United Kingdom) James Davis (United Kingdom) Matthew Summers; 4–6, 6–3, [12–10]	(Japan) Masamichi Imamura (Japan) Naoki Tajima	(Australia) Blake Mott (United Kingdom) Anton Matusevich	(United Kingdom) Johannus Monday (France) Sascha Gueymard Wayenburg (Japan) Masamichi Imamura (United Kingdom) Toby Martin
August 12	Ollersbach, Austria; Clay; M15; Singles and doubles draws	(Austria) Neil Oberleitner; 6–7^{(5–7)}, 7–6^{(10–8)}, 1-0, ret.	(Czech Republic) Jakub Nicod	(Slovakia) Andrej Martin (Austria) Sebastian Sorger	(Austria) Jan Kobierski (Germany) Luca Wiedenmann (Netherlands) Niels Visker (Italy) Luca Giacomini
August 12	Ollersbach, Austria; Clay; M15; Singles and doubles draws	(Slovakia) Miloš Karol (Slovakia) Tomáš Lánik; 6–2, 6–2	(Austria) Tobias Leitner (Austria) Lukas Rohseano	(Slovakia) Andrej Martin (Austria) Sebastian Sorger	(Austria) Jan Kobierski (Germany) Luca Wiedenmann (Netherlands) Niels Visker (Italy) Luca Giacomini
August 12	Sofia, Bulgaria; Clay; M15; Singles and doubles draws	(Argentina) Franco Ribero; 5–7, 6–4, 6–2	(Bulgaria) Ivan Ivanov	(Bulgaria) Alexander Vasilev (Italy) Mariano Tammaro	(Italy) Niccolò Ciavarella (Ukraine) Vladyslav Orlov (Bulgaria) Anthony Genov (Turkey) Gökberk Sarıtaş
August 12	Sofia, Bulgaria; Clay; M15; Singles and doubles draws	(Bulgaria) Anthony Genov (Bulgaria) Nikolay Nedelchev; 6–2, 6–7^{(3–7)}, [10–7]	(France) Arthur Géa (Ukraine) Vladyslav Orlov	(Bulgaria) Alexander Vasilev (Italy) Mariano Tammaro	(Italy) Niccolò Ciavarella (Ukraine) Vladyslav Orlov (Bulgaria) Anthony Genov (Turkey) Gökberk Sarıtaş
August 12	Überlingen, Germany; Clay; M15; Singles and doubles draws	(Germany) Maximilian Homberg; 6–2, 1–6, 6–3	(Germany) Kai Wehnelt	(France) Arthur Nagel (Germany) Liam Gavrielides	(Argentina) Franco Emanuel Egea (Germany) Mika Lipp (Germany) Justin Engel (Germany) Sebastian Prechtel
August 12	Überlingen, Germany; Clay; M15; Singles and doubles draws	(Germany) Tim Rühl (Germany) Kai Wehnelt; 6–3, 6–2	(Argentina) Franco Emanuel Egea (Peru) Petr Iamachkine	(France) Arthur Nagel (Germany) Liam Gavrielides	(Argentina) Franco Emanuel Egea (Germany) Mika Lipp (Germany) Justin Engel (Germany) Sebastian Prechtel
August 12	Bielsko-Biała, Poland; Clay; M15; Singles and doubles draws	(South Africa) Alec Beckley; 6–3, 1–6, 6–3	(Poland) Paweł Juszczak	(Czech Republic) Martin Krumich (Germany) Diego Dedura-Palomero	(Ukraine) Oleksii Krutykh (Poland) Olaf Pieczkowski (Germany) Mariano Dedura-Palomero (Czech Republic) Jan Jermář
August 12	Bielsko-Biała, Poland; Clay; M15; Singles and doubles draws	(South Africa) Alec Beckley (Poland) Jasza Szajrych; 7–5, 6–7^{(11–13)}, [10–4]	(Czech Republic) Jan Hrazdil (Czech Republic) Vojtěch Valeš	(Czech Republic) Martin Krumich (Germany) Diego Dedura-Palomero	(Ukraine) Oleksii Krutykh (Poland) Olaf Pieczkowski (Germany) Mariano Dedura-Palomero (Czech Republic) Jan Jermář
August 12	Târgu Jiu, Romania; Clay; M15; Singles and doubles draws	(Moldova) Ilya Snițari; 7–5, 6–2	(Romania) Dan Alexandru Tomescu	(Romania) Ștefan Adrian Andreescu (Romania) Călin Teodor Știrbu	(India) Manas Dhamne (Italy) Edoardo Cherie Ligniere (Romania) Vlad Cristian Breazu; Aleksander Chayka
August 12	Târgu Jiu, Romania; Clay; M15; Singles and doubles draws	(Italy) Jacopo Bilardo (Italy) Matteo De Vincentis; 6–2, 6–4	(Romania) Ioan Alexandru Chiriță (Romania) Călin Teodor Știrbu	(Romania) Ștefan Adrian Andreescu (Romania) Călin Teodor Știrbu	(India) Manas Dhamne (Italy) Edoardo Cherie Ligniere (Romania) Vlad Cristian Breazu; Aleksander Chayka
August 12	Kuršumlijska Banja, Serbia; Clay; M15; Singles and doubles draws	(Italy) Tommaso Compagnucci; 6–1, 6–2	(Argentina) Juan Pablo Paz	(Italy) Stefano D'Agostino (Argentina) Lorenzo Gagliardo	(Serbia) Aleksa Pisarić (Colombia) Daniel Salazar (Serbia) Novak Novaković (Italy) Gabriele Bosio
August 12	Kuršumlijska Banja, Serbia; Clay; M15; Singles and doubles draws	Artur Kukasian; Pavel Verbin; 6–2, 7–6^{(7–3)}	(Serbia) Romeo Hadžimehmedović (Serbia) Novak Novaković	(Italy) Stefano D'Agostino (Argentina) Lorenzo Gagliardo	(Serbia) Aleksa Pisarić (Colombia) Daniel Salazar (Serbia) Novak Novaković (Italy) Gabriele Bosio
August 12	Gijón, Spain; Clay; M15; Singles and doubles draws	(Spain) Nicolás Álvarez Varona; 6–2, 4–6, 6–2	(Netherlands) Ryan Nijboer	(Spain) Alejo Sánchez Quílez (Spain) Sergi Pérez Contri	(Spain) Iker Urribarrens Ramírez (Guadeloupe) Jean-Christian Morandais (Spain) Bryan Hernández Cortés (Spain) Imanol López Morillo
August 12	Gijón, Spain; Clay; M15; Singles and doubles draws	(Spain) Alejandro García (Spain) Mario Mansilla Díez; 6–1, 6–3	(Chile) Ignacio Antonio Becerra Otárola (Spain) Álvaro Bueno Gil	(Spain) Alejo Sánchez Quílez (Spain) Sergi Pérez Contri	(Spain) Iker Urribarrens Ramírez (Guadeloupe) Jean-Christian Morandais (Spain) Bryan Hernández Cortés (Spain) Imanol López Morillo
August 12	Ystad, Sweden; Clay; M15; Singles and doubles draws	(Luxembourg) Chris Rodesch; 6–2, 4–6, 6–3	(Germany) Louis Wessels	(Germany) John Sperle (Norway) Viktor Durasovic	(Sweden) Adam Heinonen (Sweden) Sebastian Eriksson (Denmark) Philip Hjorth (Finland) Eero Vasa
August 12	Ystad, Sweden; Clay; M15; Singles and doubles draws	(Sweden) Erik Grevelius (Sweden) Adam Heinonen; 6–4, 6–4	(Denmark) Christian Sigsgaard (Germany) Louis Wessels	(Germany) John Sperle (Norway) Viktor Durasovic	(Sweden) Adam Heinonen (Sweden) Sebastian Eriksson (Denmark) Philip Hjorth (Finland) Eero Vasa
August 12	Monastir, Tunisia; Hard; M15; Singles and doubles draws	(Ivory Coast) Eliakim Coulibaly; 6–4, 6–3	(Colombia) Adrià Soriano Barrera	Ruslan Tiukaev (Morocco) Reda Bennani	Erik Arutiunian (Canada) Jaden Weekes (Czech Republic) Petr Brunclík (France) Tom Paris
August 12	Monastir, Tunisia; Hard; M15; Singles and doubles draws	(Hungary) Gábor Hornung (Hungary) Péter Sallay; 7–5, 2–6, [10–7]	(Jordan) Mohammad Alkotop (Jordan) Mousa Alkotop	Ruslan Tiukaev (Morocco) Reda Bennani	Erik Arutiunian (Canada) Jaden Weekes (Czech Republic) Petr Brunclík (France) Tom Paris
August 12	Huntsville, United States; Clay; M15; Singles and doubles draws	(United States) Tyler Zink; 6–4, 6–1	(Japan) Leo Vithoontien	(Serbia) Aleksa Ćirić (United States) Aidan Kim	(Northern Mariana Islands) Colin Sinclair (Portugal) Tomás Luis (United States) Collin Altamirano (United States) Ryan Colby
August 12	Huntsville, United States; Clay; M15; Singles and doubles draws	(New Zealand) Finn Reynolds (United States) Jamie Vance; 6–4, 6–4	(United States) Collin Altamirano (Japan) Leo Vithoontien	(Serbia) Aleksa Ćirić (United States) Aidan Kim	(Northern Mariana Islands) Colin Sinclair (Portugal) Tomás Luis (United States) Collin Altamirano (United States) Ryan Colby
August 19	Belém, Brazil; Hard; M25; Singles and doubles draws	(Bolivia) Juan Carlos Prado Ángelo; 6–4, 6–3	(Brazil) Eduardo Ribeiro	(Brazil) Daniel Dutra da Silva (Brazil) José Pereira	(Brazil) Igor Gimenez (Brazil) Pedro Boscardin Dias (Brazil) Wilson Leite (Brazil) Enzo Kohlmann de Freitas
August 19	Belém, Brazil; Hard; M25; Singles and doubles draws	(Argentina) Mateo del Pino (Argentina) Ignacio Monzón; 6–0, 3–6, [13–11]	(Brazil) Eduardo Ribeiro (Brazil) Gabriel Roveri Sidney	(Brazil) Daniel Dutra da Silva (Brazil) José Pereira	(Brazil) Igor Gimenez (Brazil) Pedro Boscardin Dias (Brazil) Wilson Leite (Brazil) Enzo Kohlmann de Freitas
August 19	Lesa, Italy; Clay; M25; Singles and doubles draws	(Italy) Andrea Picchione; 7–6^{(7–2)}, 7–6^{(7–3)}	(Germany) Tim Handel	(Australia) Matthew Dellavedova (Italy) Gianluca Cadenasso	(Switzerland) Rémy Bertola (France) Mathias Bourgue (Switzerland) Mika Brunold (Italy) Gian Marco Ortenzi
August 19	Lesa, Italy; Clay; M25; Singles and doubles draws	(Italy) Giorgio Ricca (Italy) Alexander Weis; 6–2, 6–1	(India) Siddhant Banthia (United States) Tennyson Whiting	(Australia) Matthew Dellavedova (Italy) Gianluca Cadenasso	(Switzerland) Rémy Bertola (France) Mathias Bourgue (Switzerland) Mika Brunold (Italy) Gian Marco Ortenzi
August 19	Arequipa, Peru; Clay; M25; Singles and doubles draws	(Zimbabwe) Benjamin Lock; 6–1, 6–3	(Chile) Matías Soto	(Argentina) Juan Pablo Ficovich (Dominican Republic) Peter Bertran	(Argentina) Guido Iván Justo (Dominican Republic) Roberto Cid Subervi (Argentina) Tomás Farjat (Argentina) Renzo Olivo
August 19	Arequipa, Peru; Clay; M25; Singles and doubles draws	(Chile) Matías Soto (Colombia) Andrés Urrea; 6–2, 7–6^{(7–5)}	(United States) Pranav Kumar (United States) Noah Schachter	(Argentina) Juan Pablo Ficovich (Dominican Republic) Peter Bertran	(Argentina) Guido Iván Justo (Dominican Republic) Roberto Cid Subervi (Argentina) Tomás Farjat (Argentina) Renzo Olivo
August 19	Poznań, Poland; Clay; M25; Singles and doubles draws	(Poland) Daniel Michalski; 5–7, 6–4, 6–4	(Czech Republic) Michael Vrbenský	(South Africa) Alec Beckley (Germany) Diego Dedura-Palomero	(Uzbekistan) Sergey Fomin (Poland) Filip Pieczonka (Poland) Olaf Pieczkowski (Netherlands) Guy den Ouden
August 19	Poznań, Poland; Clay; M25; Singles and doubles draws	(Poland) Szymon Kielan (Poland) Filip Pieczonka; 6–3, 6–0	(Czech Republic) Jiří Barnat (Czech Republic) Michael Vrbenský	(South Africa) Alec Beckley (Germany) Diego Dedura-Palomero	(Uzbekistan) Sergey Fomin (Poland) Filip Pieczonka (Poland) Olaf Pieczkowski (Netherlands) Guy den Ouden
August 19	Idanha-a-Nova, Portugal; Hard; M25; Singles and doubles draws	(Paraguay) Daniel Vallejo; 6–2, 6–3	(United Kingdom) Alastair Gray	(Spain) Iván Marrero Curbelo (Portugal) Frederico Ferreira Silva	(Estonia) Daniil Glinka (United States) Maxwell McKennon (Portugal) Tiago Pereira (Uzbekistan) Khumoyun Sultanov
August 19	Idanha-a-Nova, Portugal; Hard; M25; Singles and doubles draws	(Portugal) Diogo Marques (Portugal) Tiago Pereira; 6–4, 7–5	(Germany) Lucas Deliano (Uzbekistan) Khumoyun Sultanov	(Spain) Iván Marrero Curbelo (Portugal) Frederico Ferreira Silva	(Estonia) Daniil Glinka (United States) Maxwell McKennon (Portugal) Tiago Pereira (Uzbekistan) Khumoyun Sultanov
August 19	Maribor, Slovenia; Clay; M25; Singles and doubles draws	(Croatia) Mili Poljičak; 7–5, 7–6^{(8–6)}	(Ukraine) Oleksandr Ovcharenko	(United States) Toby Kodat (Czech Republic) Jonáš Forejtek	(Slovenia) Blaž Rola (Czech Republic) Dominik Kellovský (Germany) Florian Broska (Slovenia) Bor Artnak
August 19	Maribor, Slovenia; Clay; M25; Singles and doubles draws	(Switzerland) Adrian Bodmer (Czech Republic) Dominik Kellovský; 7–6^{(7–4)}, 6–2	(Czech Republic) Filip Duda (Czech Republic) David Poljak	(United States) Toby Kodat (Czech Republic) Jonáš Forejtek	(Slovenia) Blaž Rola (Czech Republic) Dominik Kellovský (Germany) Florian Broska (Slovenia) Bor Artnak
August 19	Santander, Spain; Clay; M25; Singles and doubles draws	(Spain) Pol Martín Tiffon; 6–7^{(3–7)}, 6–2, 6–4	(Spain) Daniel Mérida	(France) Maxime Chazal (Spain) Carlos Sánchez Jover	(Spain) Albert Pedrico Kravtsov (Spain) Nicolás Álvarez Varona (United States) Dali Blanch (Spain) Diego Augusto Barreto Sánchez
August 19	Santander, Spain; Clay; M25; Singles and doubles draws	(Canada) Cleeve Harper (Spain) Iñaki Montes de la Torre; 6–3, 6–4	(Italy) Raúl Brancaccio (Spain) Sergi Pérez Contri	(France) Maxime Chazal (Spain) Carlos Sánchez Jover	(Spain) Albert Pedrico Kravtsov (Spain) Nicolás Álvarez Varona (United States) Dali Blanch (Spain) Diego Augusto Barreto Sánchez
August 19	Kottingbrunn, Austria; Clay; M15; Singles and doubles draws	(Ukraine) Oleg Prihodko; 7–5, 7–5	(Germany) Elmar Ejupovic	(Egypt) Amr Elsayed (Austria) Sebastian Sorger	(Czech Republic) Vít Kalina (Austria) Nico Hipfl (France) Léo Raquillet (Sweden) Olle Wallin
August 19	Kottingbrunn, Austria; Clay; M15; Singles and doubles draws	(Czech Republic) Jan Jermář (Slovakia) Igor Zelenay; 6–3, 6–2	(Egypt) Michael Bassem Sobhy (Egypt) Fares Zakaria	(Egypt) Amr Elsayed (Austria) Sebastian Sorger	(Czech Republic) Vít Kalina (Austria) Nico Hipfl (France) Léo Raquillet (Sweden) Olle Wallin
August 19	Lambermont, Belgium; Clay; M15; Singles and doubles draws	(Belgium) Émilien Demanet; 7–5, 3–6, 6–1	(Sweden) Sebastian Eriksson	(Germany) Adrian Ötzbach (Belgium) Simon Beaupain	(Germany) Kai Wehnelt (France) Maxence Bertimon (Germany) John Sperle (Germany) Noah Schlagenhauf
August 19	Lambermont, Belgium; Clay; M15; Singles and doubles draws	(Germany) John Sperle (Germany) Marlon Vankan; 6–0, 5–7, [11–9]	(Netherlands) Mats Hermans (Germany) Kai Wehnelt	(Germany) Adrian Ötzbach (Belgium) Simon Beaupain	(Germany) Kai Wehnelt (France) Maxence Bertimon (Germany) John Sperle (Germany) Noah Schlagenhauf
August 19	Trier, Germany; Clay; M15; Singles and doubles draws	(Germany) Justin Engel; 6–1, 6–4	(Germany) Milan Welte	(France) Amaury Raynel (Germany) Patrick Zahraj	(Germany) Lucas Gerch (Germany) Liam Gavrielides (Germany) Sebastian Prechtel (Germany) Mika Lipp
August 19	Trier, Germany; Clay; M15; Singles and doubles draws	(Germany) Lars Johann (Germany) Milan Welte; 6–4, 2–6, [10–7]	(Germany) Tim Rühl (Germany) Patrick Zahraj	(France) Amaury Raynel (Germany) Patrick Zahraj	(Germany) Lucas Gerch (Germany) Liam Gavrielides (Germany) Sebastian Prechtel (Germany) Mika Lipp
August 19	Arad, Romania; Clay; M15; Singles and doubles draws	(France) Félix Balshaw; 4–6, 7–6^{(7–3)}, 6–3	(Hungary) Péter Fajta	(Italy) Jacopo Bilardo (Romania) Ștefan Adrian Andreescu	(Romania) Nicholas David Ionel (Romania) Vlad Cristian Breazu (United Kingdom) Jeremy Gschwendtner (Italy) Matteo De Vincentis
August 19	Arad, Romania; Clay; M15; Singles and doubles draws	(Italy) Matteo De Vincentis (Slovakia) Miloš Karol; 6–3, 7–6^{(7–3)}	(Romania) Patrick Grigoriu (Romania) Daniel Uță	(Italy) Jacopo Bilardo (Romania) Ștefan Adrian Andreescu	(Romania) Nicholas David Ionel (Romania) Vlad Cristian Breazu (United Kingdom) Jeremy Gschwendtner (Italy) Matteo De Vincentis
August 19	Pirot, Serbia; Clay; M15; Singles and doubles draws	(Italy) Tommaso Compagnucci; 6–2, 6–7^{(3–7)}, 6–4	(Denmark) Kane Bonsach Ganley	(Italy) Stefano D'Agostino (Italy) Andrea Fiorentini	(Serbia) Stefan Popović (Serbia) Vuk Rađenović (Italy) Giannicola Misasi (Serbia) Dušan Obradović
August 19	Pirot, Serbia; Clay; M15; Singles and doubles draws	(Croatia) Admir Kalender (Serbia) Vuk Rađenović; 7–5, 0–6, [10–8]	(Morocco) Younes Lalami Laaroussi (Serbia) Stefan Latinović	(Italy) Stefano D'Agostino (Italy) Andrea Fiorentini	(Serbia) Stefan Popović (Serbia) Vuk Rađenović (Italy) Giannicola Misasi (Serbia) Dušan Obradović
August 19	Nakhon Si Thammarat, Thailand; Hard; M15; Singles and doubles draws	Ilia Simakin; 6–3, 6–4	(Thailand) Kasidit Samrej	(Australia) Jake Delaney (Thailand) Thantub Suksumrarn	(Sweden) Leo Borg (South Korea) Oh Chan-yeong (Japan) Ryuki Matsuda (India) Mukund Sasikumar
August 19	Nakhon Si Thammarat, Thailand; Hard; M15; Singles and doubles draws	(Thailand) Jirat Navasirisomboon (Thailand) Pawit Sornlaksup; 6–3, 6–7^{(2–7)}, [10–3]	(Japan) Tomohiro Masabayashi (Japan) Koki Matsuda	(Australia) Jake Delaney (Thailand) Thantub Suksumrarn	(Sweden) Leo Borg (South Korea) Oh Chan-yeong (Japan) Ryuki Matsuda (India) Mukund Sasikumar
August 19	Monastir, Tunisia; Hard; M15; Singles and doubles draws	Savva Polukhin; 6–1, 2–0, ret.	(Turkey) Mert Alkaya	Mikhail Gorokhov; Teymuraz Gabashvili	(Algeria) Nazim Makhlouf (Nigeria) Christopher Bulus (Tunisia) Aziz Ouakaa (Germany) Max Wiskandt
August 19	Monastir, Tunisia; Hard; M15; Singles and doubles draws	(France) Constantin Bittoun Kouzmine (Brazil) Paulo André Saraiva dos Santos; 6–4, 2–6, [10–4]	(United Kingdom) Ali Habib; Nikita Ianin	Mikhail Gorokhov; Teymuraz Gabashvili	(Algeria) Nazim Makhlouf (Nigeria) Christopher Bulus (Tunisia) Aziz Ouakaa (Germany) Max Wiskandt
August 26	Hong Kong, Hong Kong; Hard; M25; Singles and doubles draws	(Luxembourg) Chris Rodesch; 7–5, 6–4	Alexey Zakharov	(Venezuela) Gonçalo Oliveira (Japan) Masamichi Imamura	(South Korea) Shin San-hui (South Korea) Shin Woo-bin (United Kingdom) Aidan McHugh (France) Arthur Weber
August 26	Hong Kong, Hong Kong; Hard; M25; Singles and doubles draws	(China) Jin Yuquan (China) Li Zekai; 6–4, 6–4	(South Korea) Shin San-hui (South Korea) Sim Sung-been	(Venezuela) Gonçalo Oliveira (Japan) Masamichi Imamura	(South Korea) Shin San-hui (South Korea) Shin Woo-bin (United Kingdom) Aidan McHugh (France) Arthur Weber
August 26	Oldenzaal, Netherlands; Clay; M25; Singles and doubles draws	(United States) Toby Kodat; 3–6, 6–2, 7–5	(Netherlands) Max Houkes	(Netherlands) Elgin Khoeblal (Ukraine) Eric Vanshelboim	(Germany) Louis Wessels (Norway) Viktor Durasovic (Germany) Mats Rosenkranz (Netherlands) Sidané Pontjodikromo
August 26	Oldenzaal, Netherlands; Clay; M25; Singles and doubles draws	(Ukraine) Eric Vanshelboim (United Kingdom) Mark Whitehouse; 6–3, 6–4	(Netherlands) Rik Muller (Netherlands) Niels Visker	(Netherlands) Elgin Khoeblal (Ukraine) Eric Vanshelboim	(Germany) Louis Wessels (Norway) Viktor Durasovic (Germany) Mats Rosenkranz (Netherlands) Sidané Pontjodikromo
August 26	Oviedo, Spain; Clay; M25; Singles and doubles draws	(Spain) Nicolás Álvarez Varona; 7–6^{(7–3)}, 6–0	(Spain) Daniel Mérida	(Spain) Miguel Damas (Spain) Imanol López Morillo	(United Kingdom) George Loffhagen (Spain) Alejandro García (Netherlands) Ryan Nijboer (Spain) Pol Martín Tiffon
August 26	Oviedo, Spain; Clay; M25; Singles and doubles draws	(Spain) Alejo Sánchez Quílez (Spain) Benjamín Winter López; 6–1, 5–7, [13–11]	(Netherlands) Michiel de Krom (Netherlands) Ryan Nijboer	(Spain) Miguel Damas (Spain) Imanol López Morillo	(United Kingdom) George Loffhagen (Spain) Alejandro García (Netherlands) Ryan Nijboer (Spain) Pol Martín Tiffon
August 26	Sion, Switzerland; Clay; M25; Singles and doubles draws	(Germany) Christoph Negritu; 6–2, 6–3	(Switzerland) Jakub Paul	(Switzerland) Damien Wenger (Germany) Lucas Gerch	(Germany) Noah Thurner (Brazil) João Eduardo Schiessl (Italy) Gabriele Pennaforti (Czech Republic) Matěj Vocel
August 26	Sion, Switzerland; Clay; M25; Singles and doubles draws	(Switzerland) Jakub Paul (Czech Republic) Matěj Vocel; 6–2, 6–0	(Switzerland) Johan Nikles (Switzerland) Damien Wenger	(Switzerland) Damien Wenger (Germany) Lucas Gerch	(Germany) Noah Thurner (Brazil) João Eduardo Schiessl (Italy) Gabriele Pennaforti (Czech Republic) Matěj Vocel
August 26	Nakhon Si Thammarat, Thailand; Hard; M25; Singles and doubles draws	(Sweden) Leo Borg; 6–4, 6–7^{(6–8)}, 6–3	(Japan) Taisei Ichikawa	(South Korea) Park Ui-sung (Vietnam) Lý Hoàng Nam	(Thailand) Kasidit Samrej (Australia) Jake Delaney (Thailand) Pawit Sornlaksup (United States) Nick Chappell
August 26	Nakhon Si Thammarat, Thailand; Hard; M25; Singles and doubles draws	(Australia) Jake Delaney (Australia) Jesse Delaney; 6–7^{(5–7)}, 6–4, [10–7]	(India) Sai Karteek Reddy Ganta (Thailand) Wishaya Trongcharoenchaikul	(South Korea) Park Ui-sung (Vietnam) Lý Hoàng Nam	(Thailand) Kasidit Samrej (Australia) Jake Delaney (Thailand) Pawit Sornlaksup (United States) Nick Chappell
August 26	Vienna, Austria; Clay; M15; Singles and doubles draws	(Slovakia) Andrej Martin; 6–2, 6–1	(Slovakia) Miloš Karol	(Germany) Elmar Ejupovic (Austria) Neil Oberleitner	(Austria) Jonas Trinker (Germany) Peter Heller (Austria) Sebastian Sorger (United Kingdom) Anton Matusevich
August 26	Vienna, Austria; Clay; M15; Singles and doubles draws	(Slovakia) Miloš Karol (Slovakia) Tomáš Lánik; 7–6^{(7–2)}, 6–4	(Netherlands) Daniel de Jonge (Germany) Jannik Opitz	(Germany) Elmar Ejupovic (Austria) Neil Oberleitner	(Austria) Jonas Trinker (Germany) Peter Heller (Austria) Sebastian Sorger (United Kingdom) Anton Matusevich
August 26	Cap d'Agde, France; Clay; M15; Singles and doubles draws	(Germany) Justin Engel; 2–6, 6–2, 6–4	(France) Lucas Bouquet	(France) Joris Moret (France) Thomas Laurent	(Italy) Niccolò Ciavarella (France) Louis Tessa (France) Maxence Beaugé (Germany) David Fix
August 26	Cap d'Agde, France; Clay; M15; Singles and doubles draws	(France) Maxence Beaugé (France) Lucas Bouquet; 6–2, 4–6, [10–7]	(United Kingdom) Marcus Walters (United Kingdom) Dominic West	(France) Joris Moret (France) Thomas Laurent	(Italy) Niccolò Ciavarella (France) Louis Tessa (France) Maxence Beaugé (Germany) David Fix
August 26	Budapest, Hungary; Hard; M15; Singles and doubles draws	(Estonia) Daniil Glinka; 6–4, 6–3	(France) Clément Chidekh	(Israel) Orel Kimhi (United Kingdom) Hamish Stewart	(Israel) Amit Vales (Hungary) Rafael Kis Balázs (Moldova) Ilya Snițari (United States) Karl Poling
August 26	Budapest, Hungary; Hard; M15; Singles and doubles draws	(United States) Phillip Jordan (United States) Karl Poling; 6–4, 3–6, [13–11]	(United Kingdom) Hamish Stewart (United Kingdom) Harry Wendelken	(Israel) Orel Kimhi (United Kingdom) Hamish Stewart	(Israel) Amit Vales (Hungary) Rafael Kis Balázs (Moldova) Ilya Snițari (United States) Karl Poling
August 26	Bali, Indonesia; Hard; M15; Singles and doubles draws	(Australia) Omar Jasika; 6–3, 3–6, 7–6^{(7–2)}	(United Kingdom) Max Basing	(United States) Andre Ilagan (Switzerland) Luca Castelnuovo	(New Zealand) Corban Crowther (Chile) Daniel Antonio Núñez (New Zealand) Alexander Klintcharov (Japan) Shintaro Imai
August 26	Bali, Indonesia; Hard; M15; Singles and doubles draws	(Belgium) Tibo Colson (Netherlands) Thijmen Loof; 6–4, 6–3	(Australia) Moerani Bouzige (Japan) Shintaro Imai	(United States) Andre Ilagan (Switzerland) Luca Castelnuovo	(New Zealand) Corban Crowther (Chile) Daniel Antonio Núñez (New Zealand) Alexander Klintcharov (Japan) Shintaro Imai
August 26	Forlì, Italy; Clay; M15; Singles and doubles draws	(Italy) Federico Iannaccone; 6–3, 7–5	(Italy) Carlo Alberto Caniato	(Italy) Pierluigi Basile (Italy) Gabriel Maria Noce	(Mexico) Alex Hernández (Argentina) Ezequiel Simonit (Italy) Lorenzo Rottoli (Italy) Alessandro Pecci
August 26	Forlì, Italy; Clay; M15; Singles and doubles draws	(Italy) Niccolò Catini (Italy) Lorenzo Sciahbasi; 6–2, 5–7, [10–8]	(Italy) Matteo Vavassori (Italy) Edoardo Zanada	(Italy) Pierluigi Basile (Italy) Gabriel Maria Noce	(Mexico) Alex Hernández (Argentina) Ezequiel Simonit (Italy) Lorenzo Rottoli (Italy) Alessandro Pecci
August 26	Szczawno-Zdrój, Poland; Clay; M15; Singles and doubles draws	Kirill Kivattsev; 6–2, 6–3	(Poland) Paweł Juszczak	(Poland) Olaf Pieczkowski (Republic of Ireland) Michael Agwi	(Germany) Markus Malaszszak (Czech Republic) Jakub Filip (Czech Republic) Daniel Pátý (United States) Samir Banerjee
August 26	Szczawno-Zdrój, Poland; Clay; M15; Singles and doubles draws	(Poland) Szymon Kielan (Poland) Filip Pieczonka; 6–4, 6–4	(Poland) Tomasz Berkieta (Poland) Mateusz Lange	(Poland) Olaf Pieczkowski (Republic of Ireland) Michael Agwi	(Germany) Markus Malaszszak (Czech Republic) Jakub Filip (Czech Republic) Daniel Pátý (United States) Samir Banerjee
August 26	Bucharest, Romania; Clay; M15; Singles and doubles draws	(Romania) Ștefan Paloși; 7–6^{(7–4)}, 6–3	(Romania) Dan Alexandru Tomescu	(Romania) Bogdan Pavel (Romania) Sebastian Gima	(Romania) Nicholas David Ionel (Romania) Cezar Gabriel Papoe (Romania) Ioan Alexandru Chiriță (France) Mathys Erhard
August 26	Bucharest, Romania; Clay; M15; Singles and doubles draws	(Canada) Taha Baadi (Canada) Nicaise Muamba; 6–7^{(5–7)}, 6–3, [13–11]	(Romania) Ștefan Adrian Andreescu (Romania) Filip Gabriel Bara	(Romania) Bogdan Pavel (Romania) Sebastian Gima	(Romania) Nicholas David Ionel (Romania) Cezar Gabriel Papoe (Romania) Ioan Alexandru Chiriță (France) Mathys Erhard
August 26	Kuršumlijska Banja, Serbia; Clay; M15; Singles and doubles draws	(Serbia) Stefan Popović; 6–4, 6–2	Andrey Chepelev	(Serbia) Aleksa Pisarić (Bulgaria) Gabriel Donev	(Croatia) Admir Kalender (Serbia) Dušan Obradović (Morocco) Younes Lalami Laaroussi (United States) Tristan Stringer
August 26	Kuršumlijska Banja, Serbia; Clay; M15; Singles and doubles draws	(France) Luka Pavlovic (France) Paul Valsecchi; 7–5, 6–7^{(5–7)}, [10–3]	(Bulgaria) Gabriel Donev (Bulgaria) Simon Anthony Ivanov	(Serbia) Aleksa Pisarić (Bulgaria) Gabriel Donev	(Croatia) Admir Kalender (Serbia) Dušan Obradović (Morocco) Younes Lalami Laaroussi (United States) Tristan Stringer
August 26	Slovenj Gradec, Slovenia; Clay; M15; Singles and doubles draws	(Ukraine) Oleg Prihodko; 6–2, 0–6, 7–6^{(7–4)}	(Czech Republic) Dominik Kellovský	(Germany) Florian Broska (Croatia) Josip Šimundža	(Germany) Marlon Vankan (Croatia) Jerko Brkić (Hungary) Péter Fajta (Germany) Jeremy Schifris
August 26	Slovenj Gradec, Slovenia; Clay; M15; Singles and doubles draws	(Germany) Florian Broska (Austria) Gregor Ramskogler; 6–2, 6–3	(Sweden) Henrik Bladelius (Sweden) Jack Karlsson Wistrand	(Germany) Florian Broska (Croatia) Josip Šimundža	(Germany) Marlon Vankan (Croatia) Jerko Brkić (Hungary) Péter Fajta (Germany) Jeremy Schifris
August 26	Monastir, Tunisia; Hard; M15; Singles and doubles draws	Yaroslav Demin; 6–4, 0–0, ret.	(Turkey) Altuğ Çelikbilek	(Thailand) Maximus Jones (Bulgaria) Iliyan Radulov	(United Kingdom) James Story (United States) William Hsieh (United Kingdom) Ali Habib (Tunisia) Aziz Ouakaa
August 26	Monastir, Tunisia; Hard; M15; Singles and doubles draws	(United Kingdom) James Story (United States) Siem Woldeab; 6–3, 6–4	Tsihon Fedorov; Aliaksandr Liaonenka	(Thailand) Maximus Jones (Bulgaria) Iliyan Radulov	(United Kingdom) James Story (United States) William Hsieh (United Kingdom) Ali Habib (Tunisia) Aziz Ouakaa
August 26	Tashkent, Uzbekistan; Hard; M15; Singles and doubles draws	Erik Arutiunian; 7–6^{(7–1)}, 6–4	(Czech Republic) Dominik Palán	Amirkhamza Nasridinov; Aristarkh Safonov	(Japan) Yuichiro Inui (India) Aryan Shah (India) Dev Javia (Japan) Kazuma Kawachi
August 26	Tashkent, Uzbekistan; Hard; M15; Singles and doubles draws	(Japan) Yuichiro Inui (Japan) Taiyo Yamanaka; 0–6, 6–3, [11–9]	(India) Adil Kalyanpur (India) Vishnu Vardhan	Amirkhamza Nasridinov; Aristarkh Safonov	(Japan) Yuichiro Inui (India) Aryan Shah (India) Dev Javia (Japan) Kazuma Kawachi

=== September ===
Week of	Tournament	Winner	Runners-up	Semifinalists	Quarterfinalists
September 2	Bagnères-de-Bigorre, France; Hard; M25; Singles and doubles draws	Marat Sharipov; 6–2, 6–7^{(2–7)}, 7–6^{(7–3)}	(France) Clément Chidekh	(United Kingdom) Ben Jones (France) Léo Deflandre	(Mexico) Alan Fernando Rubio Fierros (France) Maxence Bertimon (Estonia) Daniil Glinka (France) Kenny de Schepper
September 2	Bagnères-de-Bigorre, France; Hard; M25; Singles and doubles draws	(France) Yanis Ghazouani Durand (France) Loann Massard; 7–6^{(7–5)}, 6–3	(United Kingdom) James Davis (United Kingdom) Ben Jones	(United Kingdom) Ben Jones (France) Léo Deflandre	(Mexico) Alan Fernando Rubio Fierros (France) Maxence Bertimon (Estonia) Daniil Glinka (France) Kenny de Schepper
September 2	Bali, Indonesia; Clay; M25; Singles and doubles draws	(Australia) Omar Jasika; 6–4, 6–1	(United Kingdom) Jay Clarke	(United States) Andre Ilagan (Australia) James McCabe	(Greece) Stefanos Sakellaridis (United States) Keegan Smith (Switzerland) Damien Wenger (Australia) Sam Ryan Ziegann
September 2	Bali, Indonesia; Clay; M25; Singles and doubles draws	(Belgium) Tibo Colson (Netherlands) Thijmen Loof; 6–3, 6–3	(Switzerland) Luca Castelnuovo (Switzerland) Damien Wenger	(United States) Andre Ilagan (Australia) James McCabe	(Greece) Stefanos Sakellaridis (United States) Keegan Smith (Switzerland) Damien Wenger (Australia) Sam Ryan Ziegann
September 2	Sapporo, Japan; Hard; M25; Singles and doubles draws	(Japan) Kokoro Isomura; 6–3, 6–2	(Japan) Naoki Nakagawa	(Japan) Yuta Kawahashi (Japan) Daisuke Sumizawa	(Venezuela) Gonçalo Oliveira (Japan) Keisuke Saitoh (Japan) Hikaru Shiraishi (United States) Jacob Brumm
September 2	Sapporo, Japan; Hard; M25; Singles and doubles draws	(Japan) Sho Katayama (Japan) Yusuke Kusuhara; 7–5, 6–1	(Japan) Yuta Kawahashi (Japan) Ryotaro Taguchi	(Japan) Yuta Kawahashi (Japan) Daisuke Sumizawa	(Venezuela) Gonçalo Oliveira (Japan) Keisuke Saitoh (Japan) Hikaru Shiraishi (United States) Jacob Brumm
September 2	Nakhon Si Thammarat, Thailand; Hard; M25; Singles and doubles draws	(Thailand) Kasidit Samrej; 6–3, 6–3	(India) Mukund Sasikumar	(Sweden) Leo Borg (Ukraine) Yurii Dzhavakian	(Japan) Hiroki Moriya (Thailand) Pawit Sornlaksup (Thailand) Thanapet Chanta (Japan) Tomohiro Masabayashi
September 2	Nakhon Si Thammarat, Thailand; Hard; M25; Singles and doubles draws	(Australia) Jake Delaney (Australia) Jesse Delaney; 7–6^{(7–4)}, 7–6^{(7–3)}	(United States) Nick Chappell (India) Sai Karteek Reddy Ganta	(Sweden) Leo Borg (Ukraine) Yurii Dzhavakian	(Japan) Hiroki Moriya (Thailand) Pawit Sornlaksup (Thailand) Thanapet Chanta (Japan) Tomohiro Masabayashi
September 2	Córdoba, Argentina; Clay; M15; Singles and doubles draws	(Argentina) Andrea Collarini; 6–2, 7–5	(Argentina) Mariano Kestelboim	(Argentina) Lorenzo Joaquín Rodríguez (Brazil) Pedro Boscardin Dias	(Argentina) Tomás Farjat (Argentina) Guido Iván Justo (Argentina) Juan Estévez (Uruguay) Franco Roncadelli
September 2	Córdoba, Argentina; Clay; M15; Singles and doubles draws	(Argentina) Mateo del Pino (Argentina) Juan Manuel La Serna; 7–5, 7–6^{(7–4)}	(Argentina) Franco Emanuel Egea (Argentina) Ignacio Monzón	(Argentina) Lorenzo Joaquín Rodríguez (Brazil) Pedro Boscardin Dias	(Argentina) Tomás Farjat (Argentina) Guido Iván Justo (Argentina) Juan Estévez (Uruguay) Franco Roncadelli
September 2	Hong Kong, Hong Kong; Hard; M15; Singles and doubles draws	(Luxembourg) Chris Rodesch; 6–4, 7–6^{(7–3)}	(Northern Mariana Islands) Colin Sinclair	(United States) Samir Banerjee (South Korea) Shin San-hui	(Australia) Edward Winter (Luxembourg) Alex Knaff (China) Mo Yecong (France) Arthur Weber
September 2	Hong Kong, Hong Kong; Hard; M15; Singles and doubles draws	(South Korea) Shin San-hui (South Korea) Sim Sung-been; 5–7, 7–6^{(11–9)}, [10–8]	(China) Mo Yecong (Chinese Taipei) Yin Bang-shuo	(United States) Samir Banerjee (South Korea) Shin San-hui	(Australia) Edward Winter (Luxembourg) Alex Knaff (China) Mo Yecong (France) Arthur Weber
September 2	Budapest, Hungary; Hard; M15; Singles and doubles draws	(United States) Tyler Stice; 3–6, 7–5, 6–4	(Italy) Leonardo Rossi	(United States) Phillip Jordan (Hungary) Ádám Jilly	(United Kingdom) Hamish Stewart (Slovakia) Michal Krajčí (Greece) Aristotelis Thanos (Italy) Michele Ribecai
September 2	Budapest, Hungary; Hard; M15; Singles and doubles draws	(United States) Phillip Jordan (United States) Karl Poling; 7–6^{(7–4)}, 6–4	(Ukraine) Illya Beloborodko (Czech Republic) Matthew William Donald	(United States) Phillip Jordan (Hungary) Ádám Jilly	(United Kingdom) Hamish Stewart (Slovakia) Michal Krajčí (Greece) Aristotelis Thanos (Italy) Michele Ribecai
September 2	Bologna, Italy; Clay; M15; Singles and doubles draws	(Italy) Gabriele Piraino; 7–5, 2–6, 7–5	(France) Mathys Erhard	(Italy) Alessandro Pecci; Kirill Kivattsev	(Italy) Niccolò Ciavarella (Italy) Lorenzo Bocchi (Italy) Andrea Paolini (Italy) Federico Iannaccone
September 2	Bologna, Italy; Clay; M15; Singles and doubles draws	(Italy) Enrico Baldisserri (Italy) Noah Perfetti; 7–6^{(8–6)}, 6–1	(Italy) Federico Marchetti (Italy) Leonardo Taddia	(Italy) Alessandro Pecci; Kirill Kivattsev	(Italy) Niccolò Ciavarella (Italy) Lorenzo Bocchi (Italy) Andrea Paolini (Italy) Federico Iannaccone
September 2	Haren, Netherlands; Clay; M15; Singles and doubles draws	(Germany) Tom Gentzsch; 6–3, 6–4	(South Africa) Alec Beckley	(Netherlands) Elgin Khoeblal (Netherlands) Niels Visker	(Netherlands) Brian Bozemoj (Germany) Tim Rühl (Netherlands) Sidané Pontjodikromo (Germany) Diego Dedura-Palomero
September 2	Haren, Netherlands; Clay; M15; Singles and doubles draws	(Germany) Tim Rühl (Germany) Patrick Zahraj; 6–3, 6–2	(Netherlands) Jim Hendrikx (Netherlands) Rik Muller	(Netherlands) Elgin Khoeblal (Netherlands) Niels Visker	(Netherlands) Brian Bozemoj (Germany) Tim Rühl (Netherlands) Sidané Pontjodikromo (Germany) Diego Dedura-Palomero
September 2	Constanța, Romania; Clay; M15; Singles and doubles draws	(Romania) Nicholas David Ionel; 6–3, 6–4	(Canada) Liam Draxl	(Romania) Ștefan Paloși (Romania) Ștefan Adrian Andreescu	(Romania) Ioan Alexandru Chiriță (Italy) Matteo De Vincentis (Italy) Pietro Marino (Canada) Dan Martin
September 2	Constanța, Romania; Clay; M15; Singles and doubles draws	(Turkey) Toprak Avcıbaşı (Romania) Mihai Alexandru Coman; 6–4, 7–5	(Romania) Vlad Cristian Breazu (Romania) Gheorghe Claudiu Schinteie	(Romania) Ștefan Paloși (Romania) Ștefan Adrian Andreescu	(Romania) Ioan Alexandru Chiriță (Italy) Matteo De Vincentis (Italy) Pietro Marino (Canada) Dan Martin
September 2	Pirot, Serbia; Clay; M15; Singles and doubles draws	(Dominican Republic) Roberto Cid Subervi; 6–2, 6–4	(Serbia) Stefan Latinović	(Argentina) Juan Pablo Paz; Pavel Verbin	(Serbia) Vuk Rađenović (Switzerland) Nikola Djosic (Serbia) Saša Marković (Serbia) Aleksa Pisarić
September 2	Pirot, Serbia; Clay; M15; Singles and doubles draws	(Croatia) Kristian Tumbas Kajgo; Pavel Verbin; 5–7, 6–4, [10–3]	(Serbia) Stefan Latinović (Bosnia and Herzegovina) Vladan Tadić	(Argentina) Juan Pablo Paz; Pavel Verbin	(Serbia) Vuk Rađenović (Switzerland) Nikola Djosic (Serbia) Saša Marković (Serbia) Aleksa Pisarić
September 2	Madrid, Spain; Clay; M15; Singles and doubles draws	(Netherlands) Michiel de Krom; 6–1, 3–6, 7–6^{(7–2)}	(Argentina) Julio César Porras	(Spain) Sergi Pérez Contri (Bulgaria) Iliyan Radulov	(Ukraine) Eric Vanshelboim (United States) Tristan McCormick (Portugal) Francisco Rocha (Spain) Pablo Masjuan Ginel
September 2	Madrid, Spain; Clay; M15; Singles and doubles draws	(Spain) Rafael Izquierdo Luque (Portugal) Francisco Rocha; 6–3, 6–3	(Morocco) Elliot Benchetrit (Morocco) Younes Lalami Laaroussi	(Spain) Sergi Pérez Contri (Bulgaria) Iliyan Radulov	(Ukraine) Eric Vanshelboim (United States) Tristan McCormick (Portugal) Francisco Rocha (Spain) Pablo Masjuan Ginel
September 2	Monastir, Tunisia; Hard; M15; Singles and doubles draws	(United Kingdom) James Story; 6–7^{(7–9)}, 6–3, 6–4	(Algeria) Samir Hamza Reguig	(Canada) Alvin Nicholas Tudorica (Belgium) Jack Logé	(United States) Garrett Johns (Thailand) Maximus Jones (Spain) Ignasi Forcano (Germany) Nino Ehrenschneider
September 2	Monastir, Tunisia; Hard; M15; Singles and doubles draws	(United States) Garrett Johns (United States) Siem Woldeab; Walkover	(Portugal) Valentin de Carvalho (Algeria) Samir Hamza Reguig	(Canada) Alvin Nicholas Tudorica (Belgium) Jack Logé	(United States) Garrett Johns (Thailand) Maximus Jones (Spain) Ignasi Forcano (Germany) Nino Ehrenschneider
September 2	Tashkent, Uzbekistan; Hard; M15; Singles and doubles draws	Petr Bar Biryukov; 4–6, 6–1, 6–4	(Georgia (country)) Zura Tkemaladze	Aristarkh Safonov (India) Sidharth Rawat	(Italy) Alexandr Binda (Czech Republic) Dominik Palán (United Kingdom) Adam Jones (India) Vishnu Vardhan
September 2	Tashkent, Uzbekistan; Hard; M15; Singles and doubles draws	(United Kingdom) Adam Jones (United Kingdom) Matthew Summers; 6–1, 3–6, [10–7]	(India) Adil Kalyanpur (India) Vishnu Vardhan	Aristarkh Safonov (India) Sidharth Rawat	(Italy) Alexandr Binda (Czech Republic) Dominik Palán (United Kingdom) Adam Jones (India) Vishnu Vardhan
September 9	Darwin Tennis International; Darwin, Australia; Hard; M25; Singles and doubles draws	(Australia) Omar Jasika; 7–5, 7–5	(Australia) Jake Delaney	(Australia) Enzo Aguiard (New Zealand) Alexander Klintcharov	(Australia) Pavle Marinkov (New Zealand) James Watt (Australia) Jacob Bradshaw (Australia) Edward Winter
September 9	Darwin Tennis International; Darwin, Australia; Hard; M25; Singles and doubles draws	(Australia) Joshua Charlton (Australia) Jake Delaney; 6–3, 6–4	(Australia) Matt Hulme (New Zealand) James Watt	(Australia) Enzo Aguiard (New Zealand) Alexander Klintcharov	(Australia) Pavle Marinkov (New Zealand) James Watt (Australia) Jacob Bradshaw (Australia) Edward Winter
September 9	Plaisir, France; Hard (i); M25; Singles and doubles draws	(France) Antoine Cornut-Chauvinc; 6–4, 1–1, ret.	(France) Clément Chidekh	(Estonia) Daniil Glinka (United Kingdom) Arthur Fery	(France) Loann Massard; Marat Sharipov (United Kingdom) Alastair Gray; Evgeny Philippov
September 9	Plaisir, France; Hard (i); M25; Singles and doubles draws	(United Kingdom) Tom Hands (United Kingdom) Harry Wendelken; 6–3, 6–4	(Germany) Mats Rosenkranz; Marat Sharipov	(Estonia) Daniil Glinka (United Kingdom) Arthur Fery	(France) Loann Massard; Marat Sharipov (United Kingdom) Alastair Gray; Evgeny Philippov
September 9	Bali, Indonesia; Clay; M25; Singles and doubles draws	(United Kingdom) Max Basing; 6–3, 6–7^{(2–7)}, 6–4	(Belgium) Tibo Colson	(Greece) Stefanos Sakellaridis (Switzerland) Damien Wenger	(United Kingdom) Jay Clarke; Bogdan Bobrov (New Zealand) Corban Crowther (India) Sidharth Rawat
September 9	Bali, Indonesia; Clay; M25; Singles and doubles draws	Bogdan Bobrov (India) Sai Karteek Reddy Ganta; 6–2, 6–4	(France) Mathieu Scaglia (United States) Jakub Wojcik	(Greece) Stefanos Sakellaridis (Switzerland) Damien Wenger	(United Kingdom) Jay Clarke; Bogdan Bobrov (New Zealand) Corban Crowther (India) Sidharth Rawat
September 9	Pozzuoli, Italy; Hard; M25; Singles and doubles draws	(Italy) Alessandro Pecci; 6–2, 6–4	(Poland) Filip Peliwo	(United States) Dali Blanch (Germany) Louis Wessels	(Australia) Matthew Dellavedova (Italy) Lorenzo Rottoli (Italy) Benito Massacri (Italy) Stefano Reitano
September 9	Pozzuoli, Italy; Hard; M25; Singles and doubles draws	(Italy) Stefano Reitano (Germany) Louis Wessels; 6–2, 6–1	(United States) Henry Barrett (Poland) Filip Peliwo	(United States) Dali Blanch (Germany) Louis Wessels	(Australia) Matthew Dellavedova (Italy) Lorenzo Rottoli (Italy) Benito Massacri (Italy) Stefano Reitano
September 9	Sapporo, Japan; Hard; M25; Singles and doubles draws	(Japan) Takuya Kumasaka; 6–2, 6–4	(Venezuela) Gonzalo Oliveira	(Japan) Masamichi Imamura (United States) Jacob Brumm	(Japan) Ryotaro Taguchi (Japan) Kokoro Isomura (Japan) Yusuke Kusuhara (Japan) Shintaro Imai
September 9	Sapporo, Japan; Hard; M25; Singles and doubles draws	(Japan) Taisei Ichikawa (Japan) Masamichi Imamura; 6–7^{(5–7)}, 7–5, [11–9]	(Japan) Kokoro Isomura (Japan) Yamato Sueoka	(Japan) Masamichi Imamura (United States) Jacob Brumm	(Japan) Ryotaro Taguchi (Japan) Kokoro Isomura (Japan) Yusuke Kusuhara (Japan) Shintaro Imai
September 9	Córdoba, Argentina; Clay; M15; Singles and doubles draws	(Argentina) Guido Iván Justo; 7–5, 7–5	(Brazil) Pedro Rodrigues	(Argentina) Fernando Cavallo (Argentina) Alex Barrena	(Argentina) Julián Cundom (Argentina) Franco Emanuel Egea (Brazil) Pedro Boscardin Dias (Argentina) Juan Estévez
September 9	Córdoba, Argentina; Clay; M15; Singles and doubles draws	(Brazil) Igor Gimenez (Brazil) Fernando Yamacita; 3–6, 7–5, [10–7]	(Argentina) Santiago de la Fuente (Argentina) Lucca Guercio	(Argentina) Fernando Cavallo (Argentina) Alex Barrena	(Argentina) Julián Cundom (Argentina) Franco Emanuel Egea (Brazil) Pedro Boscardin Dias (Argentina) Juan Estévez
September 9	Tehran, Iran; Clay; M15; Singles and doubles draws	(Italy) Lorenzo Bocchi; 1–6, 6–3, 7–5	Ivan Nedelko	Denis Klok (India) Dev Javia	(Iran) Sina Moghimi (France) Dorian Tremblay (Turkey) Mert Naci Türker (Belgium) Martin van der Meerschen
September 9	Tehran, Iran; Clay; M15; Singles and doubles draws	(India) S D Prajwal Dev (India) Dev Javia; 6–3, 7–6^{(7–5)}	(Turkey) Gökberk Sarıtaş (Turkey) Mert Naci Türker	Denis Klok (India) Dev Javia	(Iran) Sina Moghimi (France) Dorian Tremblay (Turkey) Mert Naci Türker (Belgium) Martin van der Meerschen
September 9	Buzău, Romania; Clay; M15; Singles and doubles draws	(Italy) Federico Cinà; 6–4, 6–0	(Romania) Ioan Alexandru Chiriță	(Romania) Dan Alexandru Tomescu (Romania) Dragoș Nicolae Cazacu	(Italy) Elio Jose Ribeiro Lago (Romania) Sebastian Gima (Italy) Niccolò Ciavarella (Italy) Pietro Marino
September 9	Buzău, Romania; Clay; M15; Singles and doubles draws	(Italy) Elio Jose Ribeiro Lago (Italy) Federico Campana; 7–6^{(7–5)}, 6–0	(Romania) Alexandru Cristian Dumitru (Romania) Dan Alexandru Tomescu	(Romania) Dan Alexandru Tomescu (Romania) Dragoș Nicolae Cazacu	(Italy) Elio Jose Ribeiro Lago (Romania) Sebastian Gima (Italy) Niccolò Ciavarella (Italy) Pietro Marino
September 9	Kuršumlijska Banja, Serbia; Clay; M15; Singles and doubles draws	(Italy) Alessandro Bellifemine; 7–5, 2–6, 6–1	Andrey Chepelev	(Germany) Sebastian Prechtel (Dominican Republic) Roberto Cid Subervi	Svyatoslav Gulin (Germany) Marlon Vankan (Italy) Andrea Fiorentini (Italy) Tommaso Compagnucci
September 9	Kuršumlijska Banja, Serbia; Clay; M15; Singles and doubles draws	The semi-final and final of the doubles could not be completed due to bad weather (Ukraine) Igor Dudun / (Ukraine) Ivan Kremenchutskyi		(Germany) Sebastian Prechtel (Dominican Republic) Roberto Cid Subervi	Svyatoslav Gulin (Germany) Marlon Vankan (Italy) Andrea Fiorentini (Italy) Tommaso Compagnucci
September 9	Singapore, Singapore; Hard; M15; Singles and doubles draws	(United States) Samir Banerjee; 6–1, 6–3	(Japan) Tomohiro Masabayashi	(South Korea) Shin San-hui (South Korea) Shin Woo-bin	(Spain) Guillermo Olaso (France) Loïc Namigandet Tenguère (South Korea) Sim Sung-been (Thailand) Kasidit Samrej
September 9	Singapore, Singapore; Hard; M15; Singles and doubles draws	(South Korea) Shin San-hui (South Korea) Shin Woo-bin; 6–2, 6–2	(South Korea) Park Seung-min (India) Nitin Kumar Sinha	(South Korea) Shin San-hui (South Korea) Shin Woo-bin	(Spain) Guillermo Olaso (France) Loïc Namigandet Tenguère (South Korea) Sim Sung-been (Thailand) Kasidit Samrej
September 9	Madrid, Spain; Hard; M15; Singles and doubles draws	(Spain) Daniel Mérida; 6–2, 6–3	(France) Guillaume Dalmasso	(Spain) Alejandro Manzanera Pertusa (Spain) Pablo Masjuan Ginel	(Spain) Sergio Callejón Hernando (Spain) Iván Marrero Curbelo (Netherlands) Stijn Pel (United States) Tristan McCormick
September 9	Madrid, Spain; Hard; M15; Singles and doubles draws	(Spain) Rafael Izquierdo Luque (Spain) Iván Marrero Curbelo; 4–6, 6–3, [10–7]	(Spain) Alejandro García (Spain) Mario Mansilla Díez	(Spain) Alejandro Manzanera Pertusa (Spain) Pablo Masjuan Ginel	(Spain) Sergio Callejón Hernando (Spain) Iván Marrero Curbelo (Netherlands) Stijn Pel (United States) Tristan McCormick
September 9	Monastir, Tunisia; Hard; M15; Singles and doubles draws	(United Kingdom) Ewen Lumsden; 7–5, 2–0, ret.	(India) Karan Singh	(Portugal) Tiago Pereira (France) Florent Bax	(United States) Garrett Johns (United States) Siem Woldeab; Egor Agafonov (Algeria) Samir Hamza Reguig
September 9	Monastir, Tunisia; Hard; M15; Singles and doubles draws	(France) Étienne Donnet (United Kingdom) Ewen Lumsden; 7–5, 7–6^{(7–3)}	Erik Arutiunian; Alexander Zgirovsky	(Portugal) Tiago Pereira (France) Florent Bax	(United States) Garrett Johns (United States) Siem Woldeab; Egor Agafonov (Algeria) Samir Hamza Reguig
September 16	Darwin Tennis International; Darwin, Australia; Hard; M25; Singles and doubles draws	(Australia) Omar Jasika; 1–6, 6–3, 6–4	(New Zealand) James Watt	(Australia) Jacob Bradshaw (Australia) Jake Delaney	(Australia) Matt Hulme (Australia) Jesse Delaney (Australia) Moerani Bouzige (Australia) Edward Winter
September 16	Darwin Tennis International; Darwin, Australia; Hard; M25; Singles and doubles draws	(Australia) Jake Delaney (Australia) Jesse Delaney; 6–4, 6–4	(Australia) Matt Hulme (New Zealand) James Watt	(Australia) Jacob Bradshaw (Australia) Jake Delaney	(Australia) Matt Hulme (Australia) Jesse Delaney (Australia) Moerani Bouzige (Australia) Edward Winter
September 16	Guiyang, China; Hard; M25; Singles and doubles draws	(Tunisia) Aziz Dougaz; 7–6^{(7–4)}, 6–1	(South Africa) Kris van Wyk	(Indonesia) Justin Barki; Mikalai Haliak	(South Korea) Park Yong-joon (Malaysia) Mitsuki Wei Kang Leong (Chinese Taipei) Meng Cing-yang (South Korea) Park Ui-sung
September 16	Guiyang, China; Hard; M25; Singles and doubles draws	(Chinese Taipei) Hsieh Cheng-peng (China) Zheng Baoluo; 7–5, 6–3	(Chinese Taipei) Huang Tsung-hao (Chinese Taipei) Yin Bang-shuo	(Indonesia) Justin Barki; Mikalai Haliak	(South Korea) Park Yong-joon (Malaysia) Mitsuki Wei Kang Leong (Chinese Taipei) Meng Cing-yang (South Korea) Park Ui-sung
September 16	Santa Margherita di Pula, Italy; Clay; M25; Singles and doubles draws	(Poland) Daniel Michalski; 6–0, 6–4	(Italy) Niccolò Catini	(United Kingdom) Felix Gill (Italy) Gabriele Pennaforti	(Italy) Gabriele Piraino (Spain) Carlos Sánchez Jover (Italy) Lorenzo Carboni (Italy) Andrea Picchione
September 16	Santa Margherita di Pula, Italy; Clay; M25; Singles and doubles draws	(Italy) Julian Ocleppo (Italy) Andrea Picchione; 6–3, 6–3	(Netherlands) Mats Hermans (Italy) Stefano Reitano	(United Kingdom) Felix Gill (Italy) Gabriele Pennaforti	(Italy) Gabriele Piraino (Spain) Carlos Sánchez Jover (Italy) Lorenzo Carboni (Italy) Andrea Picchione
September 16	Takasaki, Japan; Hard; M25; Singles and doubles draws	(Japan) Masamichi Imamura; Walkover	(Japan) Keisuke Saitoh	(Venezuela) Gonzalo Oliveira (Japan) Hiroki Moriya	(South Korea) Chung Hyeon (Japan) Yusuke Takahashi (Colombia) Adrià Soriano Barrera (Japan) Taisei Ichikawa
September 16	Takasaki, Japan; Hard; M25; Singles and doubles draws	(Japan) Yuta Kawahashi (Japan) Ryuki Matsuda; 7–6^{(10–8)}, 6–7^{(5–7)}, [10–6]	(Japan) Keisuke Saitoh (Japan) Naoki Tajima	(Venezuela) Gonzalo Oliveira (Japan) Hiroki Moriya	(South Korea) Chung Hyeon (Japan) Yusuke Takahashi (Colombia) Adrià Soriano Barrera (Japan) Taisei Ichikawa
September 16	Satu Mare, Romania; Clay; M25; Singles and doubles draws	(Romania) Filip Cristian Jianu; 6–4, 6–3	(Portugal) Frederico Ferreira Silva	(Germany) Tom Gentzsch (Italy) Federico Cinà	(Germany) Tim Rühl (Bulgaria) Petr Nesterov (Romania) Gabriel Ghețu (Romania) Nicholas David Ionel
September 16	Satu Mare, Romania; Clay; M25; Singles and doubles draws	(Germany) Tim Rühl (Germany) Louis Wessels; 7–6^{(8–6)}, 6–3	(Bulgaria) Petr Nesterov (Ukraine) Vladyslav Orlov	(Germany) Tom Gentzsch (Italy) Federico Cinà	(Germany) Tim Rühl (Bulgaria) Petr Nesterov (Romania) Gabriel Ghețu (Romania) Nicholas David Ionel
September 16	Pardubice, Czech Republic; Clay; M15; Singles and doubles draws	(Czech Republic) Maxim Mrva; 6–4, 7–5	(Slovakia) Miloš Karol	(Ukraine) Oleg Prihodko (Czech Republic) Štěpán Baum	(France) Amaury Raynel (Slovenia) Jan Kupčič (Czech Republic) Dominik Kellovský (Czech Republic) Daniel Pátý
September 16	Pardubice, Czech Republic; Clay; M15; Singles and doubles draws	(Czech Republic) Dominik Reček (Czech Republic) Daniel Siniakov; 6–4, 5–7, [10–6]	(Czech Republic) Jiří Barnat (Czech Republic) Jan Hrazdil	(Ukraine) Oleg Prihodko (Czech Republic) Štěpán Baum	(France) Amaury Raynel (Slovenia) Jan Kupčič (Czech Republic) Dominik Kellovský (Czech Republic) Daniel Pátý
September 16	Sharm El Sheikh, Egypt; Hard; M15; Singles and doubles draws	Evgenii Tiurnev; 7–5, 6–1	(Poland) Tomasz Berkieta	(United States) Maxwell McKennon (Italy) Alexandr Binda	(Georgia (country)) Zura Tkemaladze (United States) Evan Bynoe (Poland) Marcel Kamrowski (Hungary) Attila Boros
September 16	Sharm El Sheikh, Egypt; Hard; M15; Singles and doubles draws	(Egypt) Akram El Sallaly; Nikita Ianin; 6–7^{(3–7)}, 6–1, [10–5]	(Germany) Christoph Gayk (Poland) Marcel Kamrowski	(United States) Maxwell McKennon (Italy) Alexandr Binda	(Georgia (country)) Zura Tkemaladze (United States) Evan Bynoe (Poland) Marcel Kamrowski (Hungary) Attila Boros
September 16	Bali, Indonesia; Hard; M15; Singles and doubles draws	(United States) Andre Ilagan; 6–4, 7–5	(Ukraine) Yurii Dzhavakian	(India) Yuvan Nandal (France) Arthur Weber	(Japan) Tomohiro Masabayashi (United States) Adhithya Ganesan (Japan) Koki Matsuda; Bogdan Bobrov
September 16	Bali, Indonesia; Hard; M15; Singles and doubles draws	(Indonesia) Nathan Anthony Barki (Australia) Blake Ellis; 3–6, 7–6^{(7–2)}, [10–8]	(Japan) Tomohiro Masabayashi (Japan) Taiyo Yamanaka	(India) Yuvan Nandal (France) Arthur Weber	(Japan) Tomohiro Masabayashi (United States) Adhithya Ganesan (Japan) Koki Matsuda; Bogdan Bobrov
September 16	Tehran, Iran; Clay; M15; Singles and doubles draws	Denis Klok; 6–4, 6–0	Saveliy Ivanov	(Italy) Lorenzo Bocchi (India) Dev Javia	(India) S D Prajwal Dev (Iran) Ali Yazdani (Turkey) Mert Naci Türker (Turkey) Gökberk Sarıtaş
September 16	Tehran, Iran; Clay; M15; Singles and doubles draws	(Italy) Simone Agostini (Iran) Samyar Elyasi; 2–6, 7–6^{(7–4)}, [11–9]	(Belgium) Martin van der Meerschen (Australia) Stefan Vujic	(Italy) Lorenzo Bocchi (India) Dev Javia	(India) S D Prajwal Dev (Iran) Ali Yazdani (Turkey) Mert Naci Türker (Turkey) Gökberk Sarıtaş
September 16	Asunción, Paraguay; Clay; M15; Singles and doubles draws	(Argentina) Lautaro Midón; 6–2, 6–1	(Argentina) Franco Emanuel Egea	(Argentina) Nicolás Kicker (Argentina) Lautaro Agustín Falabella	(Brazil) Pedro Rodrigues (Argentina) Juan Estévez (Brazil) Fernando Yamacita (Brazil) Natan Rodrigues
September 16	Asunción, Paraguay; Clay; M15; Singles and doubles draws	(Chile) Benjamín Torrealba (Chile) Nicolás Villalón Valdés; 3–6, 6–4, [10–3]	(Paraguay) Hernando José Escurra Isnardi (Paraguay) Martín Antonio Vergara del Puerto	(Argentina) Nicolás Kicker (Argentina) Lautaro Agustín Falabella	(Brazil) Pedro Rodrigues (Argentina) Juan Estévez (Brazil) Fernando Yamacita (Brazil) Natan Rodrigues
September 16	Kuršumlijska Banja, Serbia; Clay; M15; Singles and doubles draws	Singles and doubles competition was cancelled due to ongoing poor weather			
September 16	Melilla, Spain; Clay; M15; Singles and doubles draws	(Spain) Imanol López Morillo; 7–5, 5–7, 6–4	(Netherlands) Michiel de Krom	(Spain) Alejo Sánchez Quílez (Spain) Benjamín Winter López	(Netherlands) Christian Lerby (Spain) Roger Pascual Ferrà (Spain) Iván Marrero Curbelo (France) Lucas Bouquet
September 16	Melilla, Spain; Clay; M15; Singles and doubles draws	(Spain) Álvaro Bueno Gil (Spain) Jordi García Mestre; 3–6, 6–4, [10–4]	(Spain) Albert Pedrico Kravtsov (Spain) Sergio Planella Hernández	(Spain) Alejo Sánchez Quílez (Spain) Benjamín Winter López	(Netherlands) Christian Lerby (Spain) Roger Pascual Ferrà (Spain) Iván Marrero Curbelo (France) Lucas Bouquet
September 16	Växjö, Sweden; Hard (i); M15; Singles and doubles draws	(Germany) Marvin Möller; 6–4, 6–4	(Sweden) Lucas Renard	(Sweden) Sebastian Eriksson (United States) Karl Poling	(Canada) Alvin Nicholas Tudorica (Sweden) Olle Wallin (India) Aryan Shah (Germany) Mats Rosenkranz
September 16	Växjö, Sweden; Hard (i); M15; Singles and doubles draws	(United Kingdom) Ben Jones (Germany) Marvin Möller; 1–6, 6–2, [10–7]	(United States) Phillip Jordan (United States) Karl Poling	(Sweden) Sebastian Eriksson (United States) Karl Poling	(Canada) Alvin Nicholas Tudorica (Sweden) Olle Wallin (India) Aryan Shah (Germany) Mats Rosenkranz
September 16	Monastir, Tunisia; Hard; M15; Singles and doubles draws	(United States) Omni Kumar; 6–3, 6–7^{(4–7)}, 6–1	(France) Louis Dussin	(United Kingdom) Ewen Lumsden (India) Karan Singh	(Spain) Alejandro Turriziani Álvarez (France) Maxence Rivet (Belgium) Jack Logé (Belgium) Émilien Demanet
September 16	Monastir, Tunisia; Hard; M15; Singles and doubles draws	(United States) Alex Jones (United States) Miles Jones; 7–5, 6–3	(Jordan) Mousa Alkotop (United Kingdom) Ewen Lumsden	(United Kingdom) Ewen Lumsden (India) Karan Singh	(Spain) Alejandro Turriziani Álvarez (France) Maxence Rivet (Belgium) Jack Logé (Belgium) Émilien Demanet
September 16	Fayetteville, United States; Hard; M15; Singles and doubles draws	(Germany) Benito Sanchez Martinez; 6–2, 6–2	(Italy) Niccolò Baroni	(France) Timo Legout (Spain) Mario Martínez Serrano	(Montenegro) Petar Jovanović (United States) Alfredo Perez (Germany) Alessio Vasquez Gehrke (Nigeria) Christopher Bulus
September 16	Fayetteville, United States; Hard; M15; Singles and doubles draws	(New Zealand) Isaac Becroft (France) Timo Legout; 4–6, 6–4, [10–8]	(United States) Alfredo Perez (United States) Jack Vance	(France) Timo Legout (Spain) Mario Martínez Serrano	(Montenegro) Petar Jovanović (United States) Alfredo Perez (Germany) Alessio Vasquez Gehrke (Nigeria) Christopher Bulus
September 23	Fuzhou, China; Hard; M25; Singles and doubles draws	(Tunisia) Aziz Dougaz; 4–6, 6–3, 5–6, ret.	(China) Cui Jie	(China) Zhang Tianhui (China) Sun Fajing	(Chinese Taipei) Huang Tsung-hao (Switzerland) Luca Castelnuovo; Mikalai Haliak (United States) Adhithya Ganesan
September 23	Fuzhou, China; Hard; M25; Singles and doubles draws	(Switzerland) Luca Castelnuovo (South Korea) Shin San-hui; 3–6, 6–4, [10–7]	(China) Yang Zijiang (China) Zeng Yaojie	(China) Zhang Tianhui (China) Sun Fajing	(Chinese Taipei) Huang Tsung-hao (Switzerland) Luca Castelnuovo; Mikalai Haliak (United States) Adhithya Ganesan
September 23	Santa Margherita di Pula, Italy; Clay; M25; Singles and doubles draws	(Spain) Carlos Sánchez Jover; 7–5, 6–2	(Ukraine) Oleksandr Ovcharenko	(Italy) Andrea Picchione (Ukraine) Oleksii Krutykh	(United Kingdom) Jay Clarke (Poland) Daniel Michalski (Italy) Andrea Guerrieri (Italy) Gabriele Pennaforti
September 23	Santa Margherita di Pula, Italy; Clay; M25; Singles and doubles draws	(Italy) Giovanni Oradini (Italy) Julian Ocleppo; 6–2, 4–6, [10–2]	(Italy) Jacopo Bilardo (Italy) Augusto Virgili	(Italy) Andrea Picchione (Ukraine) Oleksii Krutykh	(United Kingdom) Jay Clarke (Poland) Daniel Michalski (Italy) Andrea Guerrieri (Italy) Gabriele Pennaforti
September 23	Kigali, Rwanda; Clay; M25; Singles and doubles draws	(France) Corentin Denolly; 6–3, 7–6^{(7–3)}	(France) Florent Bax	(India) Karan Singh (India) Adil Kalyanpur	(Burundi) Guy Orly Iradukunda (Venezuela) Brandon Pérez (Italy) Manuel Plunger (Netherlands) Max Houkes
September 23	Kigali, Rwanda; Clay; M25; Singles and doubles draws	(Tunisia) Aziz Ouakaa (France) Corentin Denolly; 6–2, 7–5	(Zimbabwe) Courtney John Lock (Zimbabwe) Benjamin Lock	(India) Karan Singh (India) Adil Kalyanpur	(Burundi) Guy Orly Iradukunda (Venezuela) Brandon Pérez (Italy) Manuel Plunger (Netherlands) Max Houkes
September 23	Zlatibor, Serbia; Clay (i); M25; Singles and doubles draws	(France) Mathys Erhard; 7–6^{(7–4)}, 6–1	(Croatia) Mili Poljičak	(Italy) Tommaso Compagnucci (Ukraine) Oleg Prihodko	(Germany) Marko Topo (Serbia) Stefan Popović (Bosnia and Herzegovina) Andrej Nedić (Moldova) Ilya Snițari
September 23	Zlatibor, Serbia; Clay (i); M25; Singles and doubles draws	(Moldova) Ilya Snițari; Svyatoslav Gulin; 6–4, 6–1	(South Africa) Alec Beckley (Argentina) Juan Pablo Paz	(Italy) Tommaso Compagnucci (Ukraine) Oleg Prihodko	(Germany) Marko Topo (Serbia) Stefan Popović (Bosnia and Herzegovina) Andrej Nedić (Moldova) Ilya Snițari
September 23	Sabadell, Spain; Clay; M25; Singles and doubles draws	(Italy) Lorenzo Giustino; 7–5, 3–6, 6–2	(Spain) Nicolás Álvarez Varona	(Bulgaria) Iliyan Radulov (Italy) Gianluca Mager	(Peru) Ignacio Buse; Ivan Gakhov (Spain) Àlex Martí Pujolràs (Spain) Daniel Mérida
September 23	Sabadell, Spain; Clay; M25; Singles and doubles draws	(Netherlands) Ryan Nijboer (Switzerland) Johan Nikles; 6–4, 6–2	(Spain) Iñaki Montes de la Torre (Canada) Cleeve Harper	(Bulgaria) Iliyan Radulov (Italy) Gianluca Mager	(Peru) Ignacio Buse; Ivan Gakhov (Spain) Àlex Martí Pujolràs (Spain) Daniel Mérida
September 23	Falun, Sweden; Hard (i); M25; Singles and doubles draws	(Sweden) Olle Wallin; 6–3, 6–3	(Finland) Eero Vasa	(Belgium) Michael Geerts (Denmark) Christian Sigsgaard	(United Kingdom) Finn Bass (Germany) Adrian Ötzbach (Germany) Max Wiskandt (Germany) Marvin Möller
September 23	Falun, Sweden; Hard (i); M25; Singles and doubles draws	(Sweden) Adam Heinonen (Sweden) Erik Grevelius; 6–4, 6–4	(Finland) Eero Vasa (Finland) Patrick Kaukovalta	(Belgium) Michael Geerts (Denmark) Christian Sigsgaard	(United Kingdom) Finn Bass (Germany) Adrian Ötzbach (Germany) Max Wiskandt (Germany) Marvin Möller
September 23	Sharm El Sheikh, Egypt; Hard; M15; Singles and doubles draws	(Czech Republic) Marek Gengel; 6–4, 6–3	(Italy) Alexandr Binda	(Egypt) Michael Bassem Sobhy (Italy) Filippo Moroni	Evgenii Tiurnev (Poland) Marcel Kamrowski (Egypt) Fares Zakaria (Italy) Filippo Speziali
September 23	Sharm El Sheikh, Egypt; Hard; M15; Singles and doubles draws	(Poland) Szymon Kielan (Poland) Filip Pieczonka; 7–6^{(7–2)}, 7–5	Evgenii Tiurnev; Daniil Golubev	(Egypt) Michael Bassem Sobhy (Italy) Filippo Moroni	Evgenii Tiurnev (Poland) Marcel Kamrowski (Egypt) Fares Zakaria (Italy) Filippo Speziali
September 23	Asunción, Paraguay; Clay; M15; Singles and doubles draws	(Brazil) Pedro Boscardin Dias; 6–2, 7–6^{(7–4)}	(Argentina) Lautaro Midón	(Argentina) Franco Ribero (Brazil) Igor Gimenez	(Paraguay) Alex Santino Núñez Vera (Argentina) Ignacio Monzón (Argentina) Bautista Vilicich (Colombia) Johan Alexander Rodríguez
September 23	Asunción, Paraguay; Clay; M15; Singles and doubles draws	(Argentina) Santiago de la Fuente (Argentina) Lautaro Agustin Falabella; 6–3, 6–2	(Argentina) Valentín Basel (Argentina) Franco Ribero	(Argentina) Franco Ribero (Brazil) Igor Gimenez	(Paraguay) Alex Santino Núñez Vera (Argentina) Ignacio Monzón (Argentina) Bautista Vilicich (Colombia) Johan Alexander Rodríguez
September 23	Târgu Mureș, Romania; Clay; M15; Singles and doubles draws	(Romania) Nicholas David Ionel; 6–0, 4–6, 6–3	(Brazil) João Eduardo Schiessl	(Italy) Facundo Juárez; Kirill Kivattsev	(Italy) Juan Cruz Martin Manzano (Romania) Mihai Răzvan Marinescu (Romania) Dragoș Nicolae Cazacu (Italy) Federico Cinà
September 23	Târgu Mureș, Romania; Clay; M15; Singles and doubles draws	(Italy) Elio Jose Ribeiro Lago (Brazil) João Eduardo Schiessl; 6–4, 6–4	(Romania) Dan Alexandru Tomescu (Romania) Alexandru Cristian Dumitru	(Italy) Facundo Juárez; Kirill Kivattsev	(Italy) Juan Cruz Martin Manzano (Romania) Mihai Răzvan Marinescu (Romania) Dragoș Nicolae Cazacu (Italy) Federico Cinà
September 23	Trnava, Slovakia; Hard (i); M15; Singles and doubles draws	(Slovakia) Lukáš Pokorný; 7–6^{(7–2)}, 6–2	(Slovakia) Miloš Karol	(Netherlands) Niels Visker (Italy) Lorenzo Rottoli	Evgeny Karlovskiy (Ukraine) Aleksandr Braynin (Poland) Martyn Pawelski (France) Robin Catry
September 23	Trnava, Slovakia; Hard (i); M15; Singles and doubles draws	(Slovakia) Tomáš Lánik (Slovakia) Miloš Karol; 7–6^{(7–4)}, 7–5	(Germany) Kai Wehnelt (Germany) Tim Rühl	(Netherlands) Niels Visker (Italy) Lorenzo Rottoli	Evgeny Karlovskiy (Ukraine) Aleksandr Braynin (Poland) Martyn Pawelski (France) Robin Catry
September 23	Monastir, Tunisia; Hard; M15; Singles and doubles draws	(Turkey) Altuğ Çelikbilek; 4–6, 6–3, 6–2	(Spain) Carles Hernández	(Czech Republic) Jakub Nicod (United States) Omni Kumar	(Germany) Max Schönhaus (France) Luc Fomba (France) Maxence Bertimon (Italy) Mariano Tammaro
September 23	Monastir, Tunisia; Hard; M15; Singles and doubles draws	(Turkey) Altuğ Çelikbilek (Turkey) Cengiz Aksu; 6–1, 6–2	(Italy) Fabrizio Andaloro (Italy) Mariano Tammaro	(Czech Republic) Jakub Nicod (United States) Omni Kumar	(Germany) Max Schönhaus (France) Luc Fomba (France) Maxence Bertimon (Italy) Mariano Tammaro
September 30	Cairns, Australia; Hard; M25; Singles and doubles draws	(Japan) Rio Noguchi; 6–7^{(5–7)}, 6–4, 7–6^{(7–4)},	(Australia) Blake Ellis	(Australia) Edward Winter (Japan) Hiroki Moriya	(New Zealand) Alexander Klintcharov (Australia) Matt Hulme (Australia) Joshua Charlton (Australia) Scott Jones
September 30	Cairns, Australia; Hard; M25; Singles and doubles draws	(New Zealand) James Watt (Australia) Matt Hulme; 6–3, 6–7^{(5–7)}, [10–7]	(Australia) Joshua Charlton (Australia) Blake Ellis	(Australia) Edward Winter (Japan) Hiroki Moriya	(New Zealand) Alexander Klintcharov (Australia) Matt Hulme (Australia) Joshua Charlton (Australia) Scott Jones
September 30	Nevers, France; Hard (i); M25; Singles and doubles draws	(Norway) Viktor Durasovic; 6–2, 6–4	(France) Théo Papamalamis	(France) Antoine Hoang (Netherlands) Niels Visker	(France) Lucas Bouquet (France) Johan Tatlot (France) Enzo Wallart (France) Maxence Bertimon
September 30	Nevers, France; Hard (i); M25; Singles and doubles draws	(Netherlands) Niels Visker (Netherlands) Rik Muller; 7–6^{(7–3)}, 6–2	(United Kingdom) Liam Hignett (United Kingdom) James MacKinlay	(France) Antoine Hoang (Netherlands) Niels Visker	(France) Lucas Bouquet (France) Johan Tatlot (France) Enzo Wallart (France) Maxence Bertimon
September 30	Santa Margherita di Pula, Italy; Clay; M25; Singles and doubles draws	(Ukraine) Oleksandr Ovcharenko; 7–5, 6–2	(Italy) Gianluca Cadenasso	(Italy) Gabriele Piraino (Norway) Nicolai Budkov Kjær	(Italy) Giovanni Oradini (Italy) Alberto Bronzetti (Belgium) Gilles-Arnaud Bailly (Ukraine) Oleksii Krutykh
September 30	Santa Margherita di Pula, Italy; Clay; M25; Singles and doubles draws	(Ukraine) Oleksii Krutykh (Greece) Dimitris Sakellaridis; 2–6, 6–4, [10–6]	(Czech Republic) Martin Krumich (Czech Republic) Dominik Kellovský	(Italy) Gabriele Piraino (Norway) Nicolai Budkov Kjær	(Italy) Giovanni Oradini (Italy) Alberto Bronzetti (Belgium) Gilles-Arnaud Bailly (Ukraine) Oleksii Krutykh
September 30	Luque, Paraguay; Clay; M25; Singles and doubles draws	(Bolivia) Juan Carlos Prado Ángelo; 6–2, 2–6, 7–6^{(8–6)}	(Brazil) Daniel Dutra da Silva	(Brazil) Igor Gimenez (Brazil) Eduardo Ribeiro	(Mexico) Alex Hernández (Brazil) José Pereira (Mexico) Rodrigo Pacheco Méndez (Argentina) Juan Estévez
September 30	Luque, Paraguay; Clay; M25; Singles and doubles draws	(Brazil) Paulo André Saraiva dos Santos (Brazil) Luís Britto; Walkover	(Brazil) Fernando Yamacita (Brazil) Eduardo Ribeiro	(Brazil) Igor Gimenez (Brazil) Eduardo Ribeiro	(Mexico) Alex Hernández (Brazil) José Pereira (Mexico) Rodrigo Pacheco Méndez (Argentina) Juan Estévez
September 30	Kigali, Rwanda; Clay; M25; Singles and doubles draws	(Austria) Maximilian Neuchrist; 6–4, 7–5	(France) Corentin Denolly	(Netherlands) Max Houkes (Zimbabwe) Benjamin Lock	(Tunisia) Aziz Ouakaa (United States) Noah Schachter (Italy) Manuel Plunger (Germany) Maik Steiner
September 30	Kigali, Rwanda; Clay; M25; Singles and doubles draws	(Austria) Maximilian Neuchrist (Switzerland) Arthur Laborde; 6–4, 3–6, [10–4]	(Zimbabwe) Benjamin Lock (Zimbabwe) Courtney John Lock	(Netherlands) Max Houkes (Zimbabwe) Benjamin Lock	(Tunisia) Aziz Ouakaa (United States) Noah Schachter (Italy) Manuel Plunger (Germany) Maik Steiner
September 30	Zaragoza, Spain; Clay; M25; Singles and doubles draws	(France) Mathys Erhard; 4–6, 6–1, 6–4	(Netherlands) Ryan Nijboer	(Spain) Albert Pedrico Kravtsov (Spain) Nicolás Álvarez Varona	(Spain) Alejo Sánchez Quílez (Spain) Miguel Damas (Romania) Nicholas David Ionel; Ivan Gakhov
September 30	Zaragoza, Spain; Clay; M25; Singles and doubles draws	(Spain) Sergi Fita Juan (Spain) David Marrero; 6–4, 7–6^{(7–5)}	(Spain) Alberto Colás Sánchez (Spain) Juan-Samuel Arauzo-Martínez	(Spain) Albert Pedrico Kravtsov (Spain) Nicolás Álvarez Varona	(Spain) Alejo Sánchez Quílez (Spain) Miguel Damas (Romania) Nicholas David Ionel; Ivan Gakhov
September 30	Sharm El Sheikh, Egypt; Hard; M15; Singles and doubles draws	(Czech Republic) Marek Gengel; 6–4, 2–6, 7–5	(Latvia) Robert Strombachs	(Italy) Alexandr Binda (United Kingdom) James Story	(Japan) Yuta Kikuchi (Ukraine) Yurii Dzhavakian (Egypt) Michael Bassem Sobhy (Italy) Ludovico Vaccari
September 30	Sharm El Sheikh, Egypt; Hard; M15; Singles and doubles draws	(United Kingdom) Matthew Summers (United Kingdom) James Story; 3–6, 7–5, [10–7]	(Ukraine) Yurii Dzhavakian (Latvia) Robert Strombachs	(Italy) Alexandr Binda (United Kingdom) James Story	(Japan) Yuta Kikuchi (Ukraine) Yurii Dzhavakian (Egypt) Michael Bassem Sobhy (Italy) Ludovico Vaccari
September 30	Grodzisk Mazowiecki, Poland; Hard (i); M15; Singles and doubles draws	(Republic of Ireland) Michael Agwi; 6–0, 6–1	(United Kingdom) Harry Wendelken	(Czech Republic) Zdeněk Kolář (Sweden) Olle Wallin	(Finland) Eero Vasa (Poland) Paweł Juszczak (Germany) Lasse Pörtner (Poland) Jasza Szajrych
September 30	Grodzisk Mazowiecki, Poland; Hard (i); M15; Singles and doubles draws	(Czech Republic) David Poljak (Czech Republic) Jan Hrazdil; 7–6^{(7–4)}, 6–1	(United Kingdom) Tom Hands (United Kingdom) Harry Wendelken	(Czech Republic) Zdeněk Kolář (Sweden) Olle Wallin	(Finland) Eero Vasa (Poland) Paweł Juszczak (Germany) Lasse Pörtner (Poland) Jasza Szajrych
September 30	Trnava, Slovakia; Hard (i); M15; Singles and doubles draws	Evgeny Karlovskiy; 3–6, 7–5, 6–3	(Slovakia) Miloš Karol	(Ukraine) Illya Beloborodko (Czech Republic) Petr Brunclík	(Czech Republic) Matthew William Donald (Slovenia) Jan Kupčič (Germany) Kai Wehnelt (France) Loann Massard
September 30	Trnava, Slovakia; Hard (i); M15; Singles and doubles draws	(Slovakia) Lukáš Pokorný (Germany) Kai Wehnelt; 6–2, 6–4	(Czech Republic) Matyáš Černý (Ukraine) Aleksandr Braynin	(Ukraine) Illya Beloborodko (Czech Republic) Petr Brunclík	(Czech Republic) Matthew William Donald (Slovenia) Jan Kupčič (Germany) Kai Wehnelt (France) Loann Massard
September 30	Monastir, Tunisia; Hard; M15; Singles and doubles draws	(Luxembourg) Chris Rodesch; 6–3, 6–4	(Belgium) Émilien Demanet	(Italy) Fabrizio Andaloro (United States) Omni Kumar	(France) Alexandre Aubriot (Spain) Sergio Callejón Hernando (France) Constantin Bittoun Kouzmine (France) Maxence Rivet
September 30	Monastir, Tunisia; Hard; M15; Singles and doubles draws	(Luxembourg) Chris Rodesch (United States) William Woodall; 6–2, 3–6, [10–3]	(France) Constantin Bittoun Kouzmine (France) Luc Fomba	(Italy) Fabrizio Andaloro (United States) Omni Kumar	(France) Alexandre Aubriot (Spain) Sergio Callejón Hernando (France) Constantin Bittoun Kouzmine (France) Maxence Rivet
September 30	Ann Arbor, United States; Hard; M15; Singles and doubles draws	(United States) Felix Corwin; 3–6, 6–0, 6–3	(United States) Alfredo Perez	(United States) Gavin Young (Greece) Aristotelis Thanos	(United States) Nathan Ponwith (Canada) Justin Boulais (Canada) Dan Martin (United States) Adhithya Ganesan
September 30	Ann Arbor, United States; Hard; M15; Singles and doubles draws	(United Kingdom) Adam Jones (United States) Tristan McCormick; 3–6, 6–2, [10–1]	(United States) Ryan Dickerson; Martin Borisiouk	(United States) Gavin Young (Greece) Aristotelis Thanos	(United States) Nathan Ponwith (Canada) Justin Boulais (Canada) Dan Martin (United States) Adhithya Ganesan
