= 2026 Côte d'Ivoire Open – Doubles =

Doubles
- 2026 Côte d'Ivoire Open

Final
- Champions: (Belgium) Michael Geerts (Netherlands) Niels Visker
- Runners-up: (Ivory Coast) Eliakim Coulibaly (France) Calvin Hemery
- Score: 6–3, 7–6^{(7–4)}

Events
Singles	Doubles
- Côte d'Ivoire Open

Constantin Bittoun Kouzmine and Aziz Ouakaa were the defending champions but only Bittoun Kouzmine chose to defend his title, partnering Robert Strombachs. They lost in the semifinals to Michael Geerts and Niels Visker.

Geerts and Visker won the title after defeating Eliakim Coulibaly and Calvin Hemery 6–3, 7–6^{(7–4)} in the final.

== Seeds ==
1. (Belgium) Michael Geerts / (Netherlands) Niels Visker (champions)
2. (United States) Andrew Fenty / (Antigua and Barbuda) Jody Maginley (first round)
3. (United Kingdom) Tom Hands / (United Kingdom) Hamish Stewart (semifinals)
4. (Morocco) Younes Lalami / (Spain) Iván Marrero Curbelo (first round)

== Draw ==
Key

- Q = Qualifier
- WC = Wild card
- LL = Lucky loser
- Alt = Alternate
- ITF = ITF entry
- PR = Protected ranking
- SR = Special ranking
- SE = Special exempt
- JE = Junior exempt
- JR = Junior Accelerator Programme entrant
- CO = College Accelerator Programme entrant
- NG = Next Gen Accelerator Program entrant
- w/o = Walkover
- r = Retired
- d = Defaulted

First round
1	(Belgium) M Geerts (Netherlands) N Visker	5	7^{7}	[10]
(Tunisia) A Dougaz (Zimbabwe) CJ Lock	7	6^{5}	[5]
(India) Digvijaypratap Singh (India) K Singh	4	4
(France) M Chazal (Belgium) G Onclin	6	6
4	(Morocco) Y Lalami (Spain) Iván Marrero Curbelo	7^{7}	4	[4]
(France) C Bittoun Kouzmine (Latvia) R Strombachs	6^{3}	6	[10]
WC	(Tunisia) S Mansouri (Austria) M Neuchrist	w/o
(Turkey) Y Erel (Italy) Massimo Giunta
(Venezuela) B Pérez (United States) B Suarez	6	7^{7}
WC	(Denmark) OB Poulsen (India) Aditya Vishal Balsekar	4	6^{4}
(India) A Kalyanpur (India) M Sasikumar	3	5
3	(United Kingdom) T Hands (United Kingdom) H Stewart	6	7
(Turkey) Mert Alkaya (Turkey) S Mert Özdemir	6^{5}	7^{7}	[8]
(United Kingdom) P Jubb (Poland) M Kaśnikowski	7^{7}	6^{3}	[10]
(Ivory Coast) E Coulibaly (France) C Hemery	6	6
2	(United States) A Fenty (Antigua and Barbuda) J Maginley	4	3

Quarterfinals
1	(Belgium) M Geerts (Netherlands) N Visker	w/o
(France) M Chazal (Belgium) G Onclin
(France) C Bittoun Kouzmine (Latvia) R Strombachs	6	2	[10]
WC	(Tunisia) S Mansouri (Austria) M Neuchrist	2	6	[7]
(Venezuela) B Pérez (United States) B Suarez	3	6^{5}
3	(United Kingdom) T Hands (United Kingdom) H Stewart	6	7^{7}
(United Kingdom) P Jubb (Poland) M Kaśnikowski
(Ivory Coast) E Coulibaly (France) C Hemery	w/o

Semifinals
1	(Belgium) M Geerts (Netherlands) N Visker	7	6
(France) C Bittoun Kouzmine (Latvia) R Strombachs	5	3
3	(United Kingdom) T Hands (United Kingdom) H Stewart	7^{7}	4	[9]
(Ivory Coast) E Coulibaly (France) C Hemery	6^{5}	6	[11]

Final
1	(Belgium) M Geerts (Netherlands) N Visker	6	7^{7}
(Ivory Coast) E Coulibaly (France) C Hemery	3	6^{4}
