= 2026 Côte d'Ivoire Open II – Singles =

Singles
- 2026 Côte d'Ivoire Open II

Final
- Champion: (Belgium) Gauthier Onclin
- Runner-up: (United States) Michael Mmoh
- Score: 6–3, 6–4

Events
Singles	Doubles
- Côte d'Ivoire Open

Gauthier Onclin was the defending champion and successfully defended his title after defeating Michael Mmoh 6–3, 6–4 in the final.

== Seeds ==
1. (Belgium) Gauthier Onclin (champion)
2. (United States) Michael Mmoh (final)
3. (France) Florent Bax (quarterfinals)
4. (Ivory Coast) Eliakim Coulibaly (semifinals)
5. (United Kingdom) Paul Jubb (second round)
6. (Belgium) Michael Geerts (second round)
7. (Poland) Maks Kaśnikowski (second round)
8. (Jamaica) Blaise Bicknell (second round)

== Draw ==
Key

- Q = Qualifier
- WC = Wild card
- LL = Lucky loser
- Alt = Alternate
- ITF = ITF entry
- PR = Protected ranking
- SR = Special ranking
- SE = Special exempt
- JE = Junior exempt
- JR = Junior Accelerator Programme entrant
- CO = College Accelerator Programme entrant
- NG = Next Gen Accelerator Program entrant
- w/o = Walkover
- r = Retired
- d = Defaulted

=== Finals ===
Semifinals
1	(Belgium) Gauthier Onclin	2	6	6
4	(Ivory Coast) Eliakim Coulibaly	6	3	1
(Netherlands) Niels Visker	7^{8}	4	0^{r}
2	(United States) Michael Mmoh	6^{6}	6	0

Final
1	(Belgium) Gauthier Onclin	6	6
2	(United States) Michael Mmoh	3	4

=== Top half ===
First round
1	(Belgium) G Onclin	6	6
Q	(United Kingdom) Oscar Weightman	3	2
Q	(Italy) Massimo Giunta	6	6
Alt	(France) C Bittoun Kouzmine	4	4
(India) M Sasikumar	3	7^{7}	3
(Turkey) Mert Alkaya	6	6^{5}	6
Alt	(India) Digvijaypratap Singh	6^{0}	1
5	(United Kingdom) P Jubb	7^{7}	6
4	(Ivory Coast) E Coulibaly	6	7^{7}
LL	(Denmark) OB Poulsen	2	6^{4}
WC	(Morocco) K Bennani	6^{4}	6	6
(India) K Singh	7^{7}	4	2
(United Kingdom) H Stewart	6	6
Q	(India) Aditya Vishal Balsekar	2	1
(Slovenia) B Artnak	3^{r}
8	(Jamaica) B Bicknell	4

Second round
1	(Belgium) G Onclin	6^{6}	7^{7}	6
Q	(Italy) M Giunta	7^{8}	6^{2}	0
(Turkey) M Alkaya	6	6
5	(United Kingdom) P Jubb	1	4
4	(Ivory Coast) E Coulibaly	6	6
WC	(Morocco) K Bennani	1	3
(United Kingdom) H Stewart	7^{7}	4	7^{8}
8	(Jamaica) B Bicknell	6^{3}	6	6^{6}

Quarterfinals
1	(Belgium) G Onclin	6	7^{7}
(Turkey) M Alkaya	3	6^{3}
4	(Ivory Coast) E Coulibaly	6	6
(United Kingdom) H Stewart	3	2

Semifinals
1	(Belgium) G Onclin	2	6	6
4	(Ivory Coast) E Coulibaly	6	3	1

=== Bottom half ===
First round
6	(Belgium) M Geerts	6	6
(Greece) Ioannis Xilas	4	4
(Netherlands) N Visker	6	4
WC	(Morocco) Y Lalami	2	2^{r}
(Tunisia) A Dougaz	6	6
Q	(United Kingdom) Millen Hurrion	4	3
(Latvia) R Strombachs	3	6^{2}
3	(France) F Bax	6	7^{7}
7	(Poland) M Kaśnikowski	6	6
WC	(France) César Bouchelaghem	4	4
(France) C Hemery	6	6
(France) M Chazal	4	4
Q	(Spain) Iván Marrero Curbelo	6^{4}	6^{4}
Q	(France) Elijah Sanogo	7^{7}	7^{7}
(United States) A Fenty	6^{2}	7^{7}	4
2	(United States) M Mmoh	7^{7}	6^{3}	6

Second round
6	(Belgium) M Geerts	6^{7}	7^{7}	6^{3}
(Netherlands) N Visker	7^{9}	6^{3}	7^{7}
(Tunisia) A Dougaz	4	6	6^{3}
3	(France) F Bax	6	3	7^{7}
7	(Poland) M Kaśnikowski	6	6^{5}	3
(France) C Hemery	4	7^{7}	6
Q	(France) E Sanogo	0	2
2	(United States) M Mmoh	6	6

Quarterfinals
(Netherlands) N Visker	7^{7}	6
3	(France) F Bax	6^{4}	3
(France) C Hemery	6	5	3
2	(United States) M Mmoh	3	7	6

Semifinals
(Netherlands) N Visker	7^{8}	4	0^{r}
2	(United States) M Mmoh	6^{6}	6	0
