= 2026 Côte d'Ivoire Open – Singles =

Singles
- 2026 Côte d'Ivoire Open

Final
- Champion: (Belgium) Gauthier Onclin
- Runner-up: (United Kingdom) Hamish Stewart
- Score: 7–6^{(7–5)}, 7–6^{(7–2)}

Events
Singles	Doubles
- Côte d'Ivoire Open

Eliakim Coulibaly was the defending champion but lost in the first round to Hamish Stewart.

Gauthier Onclin won the title after defeating Stewart 7–6^{(7–5)}, 7–6^{(7–2)} in the final.

== Seeds ==
1. (Belgium) Gauthier Onclin (champion)
2. (Ivory Coast) Eliakim Coulibaly (first round)
3. (France) Florent Bax (quarterfinals)
4. (United Kingdom) Paul Jubb (second round, retired)
5. (Belgium) Michael Geerts (first round, retired)
6. (Poland) Maks Kaśnikowski (second round)
7. (Jamaica) Blaise Bicknell (second round)
8. (Turkey) Mert Alkaya (quarterfinals)

== Draw ==
Key

- Q = Qualifier
- WC = Wild card
- LL = Lucky loser
- Alt = Alternate
- ITF = ITF entry
- PR = Protected ranking
- SR = Special ranking
- SE = Special exempt
- JE = Junior exempt
- JR = Junior Accelerator Programme entrant
- CO = College Accelerator Programme entrant
- NG = Next Gen Accelerator Program entrant
- w/o = Walkover
- r = Retired
- d = Defaulted

=== Finals ===
Semifinals
1	(Belgium) Gauthier Onclin	6	6
WC	(France) Calvin Hemery	4	0
WC	(France) Maxime Chazal	2	1
(United Kingdom) Hamish Stewart	6	6

Final
1	(Belgium) Gauthier Onclin	7^{7}	7^{7}
(United Kingdom) Hamish Stewart	6^{5}	6^{2}

=== Top half ===
First round
1	(Belgium) G Onclin	6	6
(Latvia) R Strombachs	4	4
(France) César Bouchelaghem	6	6
Q	(Germany) Jeremy Schifris	4	3
(Italy) Massimo Giunta	7^{7}	6
(United States) A Fenty	6^{4}	2
(India) Digvijaypratap Singh	1	4
8	(Turkey) Mert Alkaya	6	6
3	(France) F Bax	6	7^{7}
(India) K Singh	3	6^{2}
(Romania) Sebastian Gima	5	2
(Netherlands) N Visker	7	6
Q	(Morocco) Y Lalami	3	4
WC	(France) C Hemery	6	6
Q	(United States) Matt Kuhar	1	0
6	(Poland) M Kaśnikowski	6	6

Second round
1	(Belgium) G Onclin	6	6
(France) C Bouchelaghem	2	4
(Italy) M Giunta	6^{7}	3
8	(Turkey) M Alkaya	7^{9}	6
3	(France) F Bax	4	6	7^{11}
(Netherlands) N Visker	6	1	6^{9}
WC	(France) C Hemery	6	6
6	(Poland) M Kaśnikowski	1	4

Quarterfinals
1	(Belgium) G Onclin	1	6	7
8	(Turkey) M Alkaya	6	2	5
3	(France) F Bax	4	6	3
WC	(France) C Hemery	6	3	6

Semifinals
1	(Belgium) G Onclin	6	6
WC	(France) C Hemery	4	0

=== Bottom half ===
First round
5	(Belgium) M Geerts	1	0^{r}
(France) C Bittoun Kouzmine	6	0
WC	(France) M Chazal	6	7^{12}
(United Kingdom) Millen Hurrion	4	6^{10}
(Austria) M Neuchrist	3^{r}
WC	(Morocco) K Bennani	4
(Tunisia) A Dougaz	6	6^{4}	3
4	(United Kingdom) P Jubb	2	7^{7}	6
7	(Jamaica) B Bicknell	6	6
Q	(Denmark) OB Poulsen	4	4
(India) M Sasikumar	6	6^{5}	4
(Turkey) Y Erel	3	7^{7}	6
Q	(Algeria) Samir Hamza Reguig	6	6
Q	(United Kingdom) Oscar Weightman	4	1
(United Kingdom) H Stewart	4	6	7^{7}
2	(Ivory Coast) E Coulibaly	6	4	6^{5}

Second round
(France) C Bittoun Kouzmine	4	4
WC	(France) M Chazal	6	6
WC	(Morocco) K Bennani	7	4	5
4	(United Kingdom) P Jubb	5	6	0^{r}
7	(Jamaica) B Bicknell	4	3
(Turkey) Y Erel	6	6
Q	(Algeria) S Hamza Reguig	0	4
(United Kingdom) H Stewart	6	6

Quarterfinals
WC	(France) M Chazal	6	3	6
WC	(Morocco) K Bennani	4	6	1
(Turkey) Y Erel	6^{5}	6^{7}
(United Kingdom) H Stewart	7^{7}	7^{9}

Semifinals
WC	(France) M Chazal	2	1
(United Kingdom) H Stewart	6	6
