= 2026 Côte d'Ivoire Open II – Doubles =

Doubles
- 2026 Côte d'Ivoire Open II

Final
- Champions: (Denmark) Oskar Brostrøm Poulsen (United States) Billy Suarez
- Runners-up: (France) Constantin Bittoun Kouzmine (Latvia) Robert Strombachs
- Score: 7–6^{(7–0)}, 6–0

Events
Singles	Doubles
- Côte d'Ivoire Open

Michael Geerts and Niels Visker were the defending champions but lost in the quarterfinals to Skander Mansouri and Brandon Pérez.

Oskar Brostrøm Poulsen and Billy Suarez won the title after defeating Constantin Bittoun Kouzmine and Robert Strombachs 7–6^{(7–0)}, 6–0 in the final.

== Seeds ==
1. (Belgium) Michael Geerts / (Netherlands) Niels Visker (quarterfinals)
2. (United States) Andrew Fenty / (Antigua and Barbuda) Jody Maginley (first round)
3. (Morocco) Younes Lalami / (Spain) Iván Marrero Curbelo (first round)
4. (United Kingdom) Tom Hands / (United Kingdom) Hamish Stewart (semifinals)

== Draw ==
Key

- Q = Qualifier
- WC = Wild card
- LL = Lucky loser
- Alt = Alternate
- ITF = ITF entry
- PR = Protected ranking
- SR = Special ranking
- SE = Special exempt
- JE = Junior exempt
- JR = Junior Accelerator Programme entrant
- CO = College Accelerator Programme entrant
- NG = Next Gen Accelerator Program entrant
- w/o = Walkover
- r = Retired
- d = Defaulted

First round
(Turkey) Mert Alkaya (Turkey) S Mert Özdemir	3	2
(Tunisia) S Mansouri (Venezuela) B Pérez	6	6
3	(Morocco) Y Lalami (Spain) Iván Marrero Curbelo	3	2
(Denmark) OB Poulsen (United States) B Suarez	6	6
(India) A Kalyanpur (India) M Sasikumar	7	6
(Tunisia) A Dougaz (Zimbabwe) CJ Lock	5	4
(France) César Bouchelaghem (France) Elijah Sanogo	6^{5}	6	[10]
WC	(Nigeria) Daniel Adeleye (Ivory Coast) Moyé Lucas Nadal Koffi	7^{7}	3	[6]
(Morocco) K Bennani (Italy) Massimo Giunta	5	0^{r}
4	(United Kingdom) T Hands (United Kingdom) H Stewart	7	0
(Italy) Matteo Fondriest (India) Aditya Vishal Balsekar
(India) Digvijaypratap Singh (India) K Singh	w/o
(France) C Bittoun Kouzmine (Latvia) R Strombachs	7^{7}	7
2	(United States) A Fenty (Antigua and Barbuda) J Maginley	6^{4}	5

Quarterfinals
1	(Belgium) M Geerts (Netherlands) N Visker	3	5
(Tunisia) S Mansouri (Venezuela) B Pérez	6	7
(Denmark) OB Poulsen (United States) B Suarez	7^{7}	6
(India) A Kalyanpur (India) M Sasikumar	6^{0}	2
(France) C Bouchelaghem (France) E Sanogo	7^{7}	3	[6]
4	(United Kingdom) T Hands (United Kingdom) H Stewart	6^{5}	6	[10]
(India) D Singh (India) K Singh	4	4
(France) C Bittoun Kouzmine (Latvia) R Strombachs	6	6

Semifinals
(Tunisia) S Mansouri (Venezuela) B Pérez	6^{7}	3
(Denmark) OB Poulsen (United States) B Suarez	7^{9}	6
4	(United Kingdom) T Hands (United Kingdom) H Stewart	6	3	[9]
(France) C Bittoun Kouzmine (Latvia) R Strombachs	4	6	[11]

Final
(Denmark) OB Poulsen (United States) B Suarez	7^{7}	6
(France) C Bittoun Kouzmine (Latvia) R Strombachs	6^{0}	0
