= 2025 Côte d'Ivoire Open – Doubles =

Doubles
- 2025 Côte d'Ivoire Open

Final
- Champions: (Australia) Matt Hulme (Netherlands) Thijmen Loof
- Runners-up: (France) Clément Chidekh (Antigua and Barbuda) Jody Maginley
- Score: 7–6^{(7–3)}, 6–4

Events
| Singles | Doubles |
- Côte d'Ivoire Open

This was the first edition of the tournament.

Matt Hulme and Thijmen Loof won the title after defeating Clément Chidekh and Jody Maginley 7–6^{(7–3)}, 6–4 in the final.

== Seeds ==
1. (Australia) Matt Hulme / (Netherlands) Thijmen Loof (champions)
2. (Bulgaria) Anthony Genov / (United Kingdom) Tom Hands (semifinals)
3. (India) Sai Karteek Reddy Ganta / (India) Adil Kalyanpur (first round)
4. (France) Constantin Bittoun Kouzmine / (Tunisia) Aziz Ouakaa (first round)

== Draw ==
Key

- Q = Qualifier
- WC = Wild card
- LL = Lucky loser
- Alt = Alternate
- ITF = ITF entry
- PR = Protected ranking
- SR = Special ranking
- SE = Special exempt
- JE = Junior exempt
- JR = Junior Accelerator Programme entrant
- CO = College Accelerator Programme entrant
- NG = Next Gen Accelerator Program entrant
- w/o = Walkover
- r = Retired
- d = Defaulted

=== Draw ===
First round
1 | (Australia) M Hulme (Netherlands) T Loof | 5 | 6 | [10]
(Tunisia) M Echargui (Italy) Luca Potenza | 7 | 2 | [8]
(Georgia (country)) A Bakshi (India) SDP Dev | 6 | 6
WC | (Ivory Coast) Abdoulaziz Bationo (Morocco) Y Lalami Laaroussi | 3 | 4
4 | (France) C Bittoun Kouzmine (Tunisia) A Ouakaa | 3 | 3
(Lithuania) R Berankis (Czech Republic) D Kellovský | 6 | 6
PR | (India) Aryan Shah (India) Parikshit Somani | 2 | 7 | [10]
(Venezuela) Juan José Bianchi (Venezuela) B Pérez | 6 | 5 | [6]
(Turkey) Y Erel (Turkey) E Kırkın | 5 | 6^{4}
(France) C Chidekh (Antigua and Barbuda) J Maginley | 7 | 7^{7}
WC | (Ivory Coast) Myko Yohann Himad Kouame (France) B Paire | 7^{10} | 3 | [10]
3 | (India) Sai Karteek Reddy Ganta (India) A Kalyanpur | 6^{8} | 6 | [3]
(Belgium) M Geerts (Estonia) Johannes Seeman | 6 | 6^{1} | [4]
(France) R Bertrand (Ivory Coast) E Coulibaly | 0 | 7^{7} | [10]
(South Africa) P Henning (South Africa) Kris van Wyk | 4 | 3
2 | (Bulgaria) A Genov (United Kingdom) T Hands | 6 | 6

Quarterfinals
1 | (Australia) M Hulme (Netherlands) T Loof | 6 | 7^{7}
(Georgia (country)) A Bakshi (India) SDP Dev | 1 | 6^{4}
(Lithuania) R Berankis (Czech Republic) D Kellovský | 6 | 6
PR | (India) A Shah (India) P Somani | 4 | 1
(France) C Chidekh (Antigua and Barbuda) J Maginley | 7^{7} | 6
WC | (Ivory Coast) MYH Kouame (France) B Paire | 6^{2} | 2
(France) R Bertrand (Ivory Coast) E Coulibaly | 3 | 4
2 | (Bulgaria) A Genov (United Kingdom) T Hands | 6 | 6

Semifinals
1 | (Australia) M Hulme (Netherlands) T Loof | w/o
(Lithuania) R Berankis (Czech Republic) D Kellovský
(France) C Chidekh (Antigua and Barbuda) J Maginley | 7^{7} | 6^{4} | [12]
2 | (Bulgaria) A Genov (United Kingdom) T Hands | 6^{5} | 7^{7} | [10]

Final
1 | (Australia) M Hulme (Netherlands) T Loof | 7^{7} | 6
(France) C Chidekh (Antigua and Barbuda) J Maginley | 6^{3} | 4
