= 2025 Côte d'Ivoire Open – Singles =

Singles
- 2025 Côte d'Ivoire Open

Final
- Champion: (Thailand) Maximus Jones
- Runner-up: (Lithuania) Ričardas Berankis
- Score: 6–3, 4–6, 6–4

Events
Singles	Doubles
- Côte d'Ivoire Open

This was the first edition of the tournament.

Maximus Jones won the title after defeating Ričardas Berankis 6–3, 4–6, 6–4 in the final.

== Seeds ==
1. (Tunisia) Aziz Dougaz (second round)
2. (France) Robin Bertrand (quarterfinals)
3. (Belgium) Michael Geerts (quarterfinals)
4. (France) Clément Chidekh (second round)
5. (Lithuania) Ričardas Berankis (final)
6. (Turkey) Ergi Kırkın (second round)
7. (Ivory Coast) Eliakim Coulibaly (first round)
8. (South Africa) Philip Henning (second round)

== Draw ==
Key

- Q = Qualifier
- WC = Wild card
- LL = Lucky loser
- Alt = Alternate
- ITF = ITF entry
- PR = Protected ranking
- SR = Special ranking
- SE = Special exempt
- JE = Junior exempt
- JR = Junior Accelerator Programme entrant
- CO = College Accelerator Programme entrant
- NG = Next Gen Accelerator Program entrant
- w/o = Walkover
- r = Retired
- d = Defaulted

=== Finals ===
Semifinals
Q	(France) Florent Bax	7^{7}	4	4
Q	(Thailand) Maximus Jones	6^{5}	6	6
5	(Lithuania) Ričardas Berankis	7^{7}	6^{4}	6
(Belgium) Tibo Colson	6^{4}	7^{7}	4

Final
Q	(Thailand) Maximus Jones	6	4	6
5	(Lithuania) Ričardas Berankis	3	6	4

=== Top half ===
First round
1	(Tunisia) A Dougaz	6	6
(United Kingdom) T Samuel	3	4
Q	(France) F Bax	6	6
(India) K Singh	4	4
(United Kingdom) G Hussey	7^{7}	4	6
(Czech Republic) D Kellovský	6^{5}	6	1
(France) L Poullain	6^{5}	3
8	(South Africa) P Henning	7^{7}	6
4	(France) C Chidekh	6	6
Q	(Czech Republic) D Palán	3	2
Q	(Thailand) M Jones	7	2	7^{7}
(South Africa) Kris van Wyk	5	6	6^{4}
WC	(France) B Paire	4	7	4
(Estonia) D Glinka	6	5	6
WC	(Morocco) T Baadi	7	4	6
7	(Ivory Coast) E Coulibaly	5	6	4

Second round
1	(Tunisia) A Dougaz	4	4
Q	(France) F Bax	6	6
(United Kingdom) G Hussey	6	6
8	(South Africa) P Henning	4	3
4	(France) C Chidekh	3	2
Q	(Thailand) M Jones	6	6
(Estonia) D Glinka	7	7^{7}
WC	(Morocco) T Baadi	5	6^{1}

Quarterfinals
Q	(France) F Bax	7^{7}	6
(United Kingdom) G Hussey	6^{5}	4
Q	(Thailand) M Jones	6	6
(Estonia) D Glinka	4	2

Semifinals
Q	(France) F Bax	7^{7}	4	4
Q	(Thailand) M Jones	6^{5}	6	6

=== Bottom half ===
First round
5	(Lithuania) R Berankis	3	6	6
(India) Aryan Shah	6	2	4
Kirill Kivattsev	6	3	5
(Georgia (country)) A Bakshi	1	6	7
(Italy) Luca Potenza	6^{3}	6	6
Q	(Turkey) Y Erel	7^{7}	3	4
Q	(India) A Kalyanpur	1	3
3	(Belgium) M Geerts	6	6
6	(Turkey) E Kırkın	7	7
Q	(Tunisia) A Ouakaa	5	5
WC	(Ivory Coast) Abdoulaziz Bationo	3	4
(Belgium) T Colson	6	6
(Ukraine) Vadym Ursu	6	3	6
(Tunisia) M Echargui	1	6	3
(Italy) Tommaso Compagnucci	2	6	3
2	(France) R Bertrand	6	3	6

Second round
5	(Lithuania) R Berankis	7^{9}	6
(Georgia (country)) A Bakshi	6^{7}	2
(Italy) L Potenza	6	6^{5}	2
3	(Belgium) M Geerts	2	7^{7}	6
6	(Turkey) E Kırkın	3	6^{4}
(Belgium) T Colson	6	7^{7}
(Ukraine) V Ursu	2	0
2	(France) R Bertrand	6	6

Quarterfinals
5	(Lithuania) R Berankis	6	4	7^{7}
3	(Belgium) M Geerts	4	6	6^{5}
(Belgium) T Colson	6	6
2	(France) R Bertrand	3	4

Semifinals
5	(Lithuania) R Berankis	7^{7}	6^{4}	6
(Belgium) T Colson	6^{4}	7^{7}	4
