= 2025 Côte d'Ivoire Open II – Doubles =

Doubles
- 2025 Côte d'Ivoire Open II

Final
- Champions: (France) Constantin Bittoun Kouzmine (Tunisia) Aziz Ouakaa
- Runners-up: (Georgia (country)) Aleksandre Bakshi (India) S D Prajwal Dev
- Score: 7–6^{(7–5)}, 7–5

Events
Singles	Doubles
- Côte d'Ivoire Open

Matt Hulme and Thijmen Loof were the defending champions but lost in the first round to Taha Baadi and Eliakim Coulibaly.

Constantin Bittoun Kouzmine and Aziz Ouakaa won the title after defeating Aleksandre Bakshi and S D Prajwal Dev 7–6^{(7–5)}, 7–5 in the final.

== Seeds ==
1. (Australia) Matt Hulme / (Netherlands) Thijmen Loof (first round)
2. (Bulgaria) Anthony Genov / (United Kingdom) Tom Hands (quarterfinals)
3. (India) Sai Karteek Reddy Ganta / (India) Adil Kalyanpur (semifinals)
4. (Georgia (country)) Aleksandre Bakshi / (India) S D Prajwal Dev (final)

== Draw ==
Key

- Q = Qualifier
- WC = Wild card
- LL = Lucky loser
- Alt = Alternate
- ITF = ITF entry
- PR = Protected ranking
- SR = Special ranking
- SE = Special exempt
- JE = Junior exempt
- JR = Junior Accelerator Programme entrant
- CO = College Accelerator Programme entrant
- NG = Next Gen Accelerator Program entrant
- w/o = Walkover
- r = Retired
- d = Defaulted

=== Draw ===
First round
1	(Australia) M Hulme (Netherlands) T Loof	6^{4}	4
WC	(Morocco) T Baadi (Ivory Coast) E Coulibaly	7^{7}	6
(Ukraine) Vadym Ursu (Switzerland) D Wenger	6	3	[5]
(France) C Bittoun Kouzmine (Tunisia) A Ouakaa	4	6	[10]
3	(India) Sai Karteek Reddy Ganta (India) A Kalyanpur	w/o
WC	(Senegal) Seydina André (Ivory Coast) Myko Yohann Himad Kouame
(South Africa) P Henning (South Africa) Kris van Wyk	6	3	[5]
(France) C Chidekh (Antigua and Barbuda) J Maginley	2	6	[10]
(India) Aryan Shah (India) Parikshit Somani	6	6
(Belgium) T Colson; Aleksandr Lobanov	3	4
(Venezuela) Juan José Bianchi (Venezuela) B Pérez	5	1
4	(Georgia (country)) A Bakshi (India) SDP Dev	7	6
(Tunisia) M Echargui (Italy) Luca Potenza
(Belgium) M Geerts (Estonia) Johannes Seeman	w/o
(Turkey) Y Erel (Turkey) E Kırkın
2	(Bulgaria) A Genov (United Kingdom) T Hands	w/o

Quarterfinals
WC	(Morocco) T Baadi (Ivory Coast) E Coulibaly	7^{7}	2	[8]
(France) C Bittoun Kouzmine (Tunisia) A Ouakaa	6^{4}	6	[10]
3	(India) SKR Ganta (India) A Kalyanpur	7^{7}	2	[10]
(France) C Chidekh (Antigua and Barbuda) J Maginley	6^{2}	6	[7]
(India) A Shah (India) P Somani
4	(Georgia (country)) A Bakshi (India) SDP Dev	w/o
(Belgium) M Geerts (Estonia) J Seeman	3	3
2	(Bulgaria) A Genov (United Kingdom) T Hands	6	6

Semifinals
(France) C Bittoun Kouzmine (Tunisia) A Ouakaa	6	6
3	(India) SKR Ganta (India) A Kalyanpur	3	4
4	(Georgia (country)) A Bakshi (India) SDP Dev	6	4	[10]
2	(Bulgaria) A Genov (United Kingdom) T Hands	4	6	[8]

Final
(France) C Bittoun Kouzmine (Tunisia) A Ouakaa	7^{7}	7
4	(Georgia (country)) A Bakshi (India) SDP Dev	6^{5}	5
