= 2025 Côte d'Ivoire Open II – Singles =

Singles
- 2025 Côte d'Ivoire Open II

Final
- Champion: (Ivory Coast) Eliakim Coulibaly
- Runner-up: (Tunisia) Aziz Dougaz
- Score: 6–7^{(3–7)}, 6–4, 6–4

Events
Singles	Doubles
- Côte d'Ivoire Open

Maximus Jones was the defending champion but lost in the second round to Clément Chidekh.

Eliakim Coulibaly won the title after defeating Aziz Dougaz 6–7^{(3–7)}, 6–4, 6–4 in the final. Coulibaly became the first player from Ivory Coast to win an ATP Challenger Tour tournament.

== Seeds ==
1. (Tunisia) Aziz Dougaz (final)
2. (France) Robin Bertrand (second round)
3. (Belgium) Michael Geerts (semifinals)
4. (France) Clément Chidekh (quarterfinals)
5. (Lithuania) Ričardas Berankis (semifinals)
6. (Turkey) Ergi Kırkın (second round)
7. (Ivory Coast) Eliakim Coulibaly (champion)
8. (South Africa) Philip Henning (quarterfinals)

== Draw ==
Key

- Q = Qualifier
- WC = Wild card
- LL = Lucky loser
- Alt = Alternate
- ITF = ITF entry
- PR = Protected ranking
- SR = Special ranking
- SE = Special exempt
- JE = Junior exempt
- JR = Junior Accelerator Programme entrant
- CO = College Accelerator Programme entrant
- NG = Next Gen Accelerator Program entrant
- w/o = Walkover
- r = Retired
- d = Defaulted

=== Finals ===
Semifinals
1	(Tunisia) Aziz Dougaz	7	7^{7}
3	(Belgium) Michael Geerts	5	6^{5}
5	(Lithuania) Ričardas Berankis	6	3	5
7	(Ivory Coast) Eliakim Coulibaly	3	6	7

Final
1	(Tunisia) Aziz Dougaz	7^{7}	4	4
7	(Ivory Coast) Eliakim Coulibaly	6^{3}	6	6

=== Top half ===
First round
1	(Tunisia) A Dougaz	6	7
Q	(France) C Bittoun Kouzmine	4	5
(France) L Poullain	4	4
(Tunisia) M Echargui	6	6
(United Kingdom) G Hussey	6	1	4
(United Kingdom) T Samuel	4	6	1^{r}
Q	(France) Guillaume Dalmasso	7^{7}	6^{6}	2
8	(South Africa) P Henning	6^{4}	7^{8}	6
3	(Belgium) M Geerts	6	3	6
(Belgium) T Colson	4	6	4
(Czech Republic) D Kellovský	7	6
(Italy) Tommaso Compagnucci	5	0
WC	(Morocco) T Baadi	6^{5}	2
(India) Aryan Shah	7^{7}	6
Q	(France) Nicolas Jadoun	1	4
6	(Turkey) E Kırkın	6	6

Second round
1	(Tunisia) A Dougaz	7	6
(Tunisia) M Echargui	5	2
(United Kingdom) G Hussey	5	6	2
8	(South Africa) P Henning	7	3	6
3	(Belgium) M Geerts	7^{7}	6
(Czech Republic) D Kellovský	6^{3}	2
(India) A Shah	6	4	6
6	(Turkey) E Kırkın	1	6	4

Quarterfinals
1	(Tunisia) A Dougaz	6	6
8	(South Africa) P Henning	0	3
3	(Belgium) M Geerts	7^{9}	2
(India) A Shah	6^{7}	2^{r}

Semifinals
1	(Tunisia) A Dougaz	7	7^{7}
3	(Belgium) M Geerts	5	6^{5}

=== Bottom half ===
First round
5	(Lithuania) R Berankis	7^{7}	0
WC	(France) B Paire	6^{4}	0^{r}
Q	(Turkey) Y Erel	6	6
(Estonia) D Glinka	4	4
SE	(Thailand) M Jones	6	7^{7}
Q	(Tunisia) A Ouakaa	4	6^{4}
WC	(Senegal) Seydina André	5	6	6^{2}
4	(France) C Chidekh	7	4	7^{7}
7	(Ivory Coast) E Coulibaly	6	6
Q	(France) F Bax	2	4
Kirill Kivattsev	7	7
(South Africa) Kris van Wyk	5	5
(India) K Singh	5	7^{7}	4
(Georgia (country)) A Bakshi	7	6^{3}	6
(Ukraine) Vadym Ursu	3	0
2	(France) R Bertrand	6	6

Second round
5	(Lithuania) R Berankis	w/o
Q	(Turkey) Y Erel
SE	(Thailand) M Jones	6	4	1
4	(France) C Chidekh	3	6	6
7	(Ivory Coast) E Coulibaly	6	6
K Kivattsev	2	4
(Georgia (country)) A Bakshi	6	7
2	(France) R Bertrand	3	5

Quarterfinals
5	(Lithuania) R Berankis	7^{7}	7^{7}
4	(France) C Chidekh	6^{5}	6^{3}
7	(Ivory Coast) E Coulibaly	6	6
(Georgia (country)) A Bakshi	2	0

Semifinals
5	(Lithuania) R Berankis	6	3	5
7	(Ivory Coast) E Coulibaly	3	6	7
