= 2025 Côte d'Ivoire Open II =

- Date: 21–27 April
- Edition: 2nd
- Surface: Hard
- Location: Abidjan, Ivory Coast

Champions

Singles
- (Ivory Coast) Eliakim Coulibaly

Doubles
- (France) Constantin Bittoun Kouzmine / (Tunisia) Aziz Ouakaa
← 2025 ·	Côte d'Ivoire Open	· 2026 →

The 2025 Côte d'Ivoire Open II was a professional tennis tournament played on hard courts. It was the second edition of the tournament which was part of the 2025 ATP Challenger Tour. It took place in Abidjan, Ivory Coast, between 21 and 27 April 2025.

== Singles main-draw entrants ==
=== Seeds ===
Country	Player	Rank^{1}	Seed
TUN	Aziz Dougaz	185	1
FRA	Robin Bertrand	268	2
BEL	Michael Geerts	290	3
FRA	Clément Chidekh	291	4
LTU	Ričardas Berankis	297	5
TUR	Ergi Kırkın	314	6
CIV	Eliakim Coulibaly	323	7
RSA	Philip Henning	368	8

- ^{1} Rankings as of 14 April 2025.

=== Other entrants ===
The following players received wildcards into the singles main draw:

- (Senegal) Seydina André
- (Morocco) Taha Baadi
- (France) Benoît Paire

The following player received entry into the singles main draw as a special exempt:

- (Thailand) Maximus Jones

The following players received entry from the qualifying draw:

- (France) Florent Bax
- (France) Constantin Bittoun Kouzmine
- (France) Guillaume Dalmasso
- (Turkey) Yankı Erel
- (France) Nicolas Jadoun
- (Tunisia) Aziz Ouakaa

== Champions ==
=== Singles ===
- (Ivory Coast) Eliakim Coulibaly def. (Tunisia) Aziz Dougaz 6–7^{(3–7)}, 6–4, 6–4.

=== Doubles ===
- (France) Constantin Bittoun Kouzmine / (Tunisia) Aziz Ouakaa def. (Georgia (country)) Aleksandre Bakshi / (India) S D Prajwal Dev 7–6^{(7–5)}, 7–5.
