= 2025 Côte d'Ivoire Open =

- Date: 14–20 April
- Edition: 1st
- Surface: Hard
- Location: Abidjan, Ivory Coast

Champions

Singles
- (Thailand) Maximus Jones

Doubles
- (Australia) Matt Hulme / (Netherlands) Thijmen Loof
- Côte d'Ivoire Open

The 2025 Côte d'Ivoire Open was a professional tennis tournament played on hardcourts. It was the first edition of the tournament which was part of the 2025 ATP Challenger Tour. It took place in Abidjan, Ivory Coast between 14 and 20 April 2025.

== Singles main-draw entrants ==
=== Seeds ===
Country	Player	Rank^{1}	Seed
TUN	Aziz Dougaz	197	1
FRA	Robin Bertrand	264	2
BEL	Michael Geerts	289	3
FRA	Clément Chidekh	292	4
LTU	Ričardas Berankis	300	5
TUR	Ergi Kırkın	316	6
CIV	Eliakim Coulibaly	327	7
RSA	Philip Henning	367	8

- ^{1} Rankings as of 7 April 2025.

=== Other entrants ===
The following players received wildcards into the singles main draw:

- (Morocco) Taha Baadi
- (Ivory Coast) Abdoulaziz Bationo
- (France) Benoît Paire

The following players received entry from the qualifying draw:

- (France) Florent Bax
- (Turkey) Yankı Erel
- (Thailand) Maximus Jones
- (India) Adil Kalyanpur
- (Tunisia) Aziz Ouakaa
- (Czech Republic) Dominik Palán

== Champions ==
=== Singles ===
- (Thailand) Maximus Jones def. (Lithuania) Ričardas Berankis 6–3, 4–6, 6–4.

=== Doubles ===
- (Australia) Matt Hulme / (Netherlands) Thijmen Loof def. (France) Clément Chidekh / (Antigua and Barbuda) Jody Maginley 7–6^{(7–3)}, 6–4.
