= Côte d'Ivoire Open =

- 2025 Côte d'Ivoire Open

ATP Challenger Tour
- Location: Abidjan, Ivory Coast
- Venue: Sofitel Hôtel Ivoire Sports Complex
- Category: ATP Challenger Tour
- Surface: Hard

The Côte d'Ivoire Open is a professional tennis tournament played on hardcourts. It is currently part of the ATP Challenger Tour. It was first held in Abidjan, Ivory Coast in 2025.

== Past finals ==
=== Singles ===
| Year | Champion | Runner-up | Score |
|---|---|---|---|
| 2026 (2) | (Belgium) Gauthier Onclin | (United States) Michael Mmoh | 6–3, 6–4 |
| 2026 (1) | (Belgium) Gauthier Onclin | (United Kingdom) Hamish Stewart | 7–6^{(7–5)}, 7–6^{(7–2)} |
| 2025 (2) | (Ivory Coast) Eliakim Coulibaly | (Tunisia) Aziz Dougaz | 6–7^{(3–7)}, 6–4, 6–4 |
| 2025 (1) | (Thailand) Maximus Jones | (Lithuania) Ričardas Berankis | 6–3, 4–6, 6–4 |

=== Doubles ===
| Year | Champions | Runners-up | Score |
|---|---|---|---|
| 2026 (2) | (Denmark) Oskar Brostrøm Poulsen (United States) Billy Suarez | (France) Constantin Bittoun Kouzmine (Latvia) Robert Strombachs | 7–6^{(7–0)}, 6–0 |
| 2026 (1) | (Belgium) Michael Geerts (Netherlands) Niels Visker | (Ivory Coast) Eliakim Coulibaly (France) Calvin Hemery | 6–3, 7–6^{(7–4)} |
| 2025 (2) | (France) Constantin Bittoun Kouzmine (Tunisia) Aziz Ouakaa | (Georgia (country)) Aleksandre Bakshi (India) S D Prajwal Dev | 7–6^{(7–5)}, 7–5 |
| 2025 (1) | (Australia) Matt Hulme (Netherlands) Thijmen Loof | (France) Clément Chidekh (Antigua and Barbuda) Jody Maginley | 7–6^{(7–3)}, 6–4 |
