= 2026 Trofeo Città di Cesenatico – Doubles =

Doubles
- 2026 Trofeo Città di Cesenatico

Final
- Champions: (Netherlands) Jarno Jans (Netherlands) Niels Visker
- Runners-up: (Italy) Francesco Forti (Italy) Filippo Romano
- Score: 7–6^{(9–7)}, 6–3

Events
Singles	Doubles
- Trofeo Città di Cesenatico

This was the first edition of the tournament.

Jarno Jans and Niels Visker won the title after defeating Francesco Forti and Filippo Romano 7–6^{(9–7)}, 6–3 in the final.

== Seeds ==
1. (Italy) Giorgio Ricca / (Netherlands) Mick Veldheer (semifinals)
2. (United Kingdom) Charles Broom / (Czech Republic) David Poljak (semifinals)
3. (Netherlands) Jarno Jans / (Netherlands) Niels Visker (champions)
4. (Italy) Francesco Forti / (Italy) Filippo Romano (final)

== Draw ==
Key

- Q = Qualifier
- WC = Wild card
- LL = Lucky loser
- Alt = Alternate
- ITF = ITF entry
- PR = Protected ranking
- SR = Special ranking
- SE = Special exempt
- JE = Junior exempt
- JR = Junior Accelerator Programme entrant
- CO = College Accelerator Programme entrant
- NG = Next Gen Accelerator Program entrant
- w/o = Walkover
- r = Retired
- d = Defaulted

First round
1	(Italy) G Ricca (Netherlands) M Veldheer	6	6
WC	(Italy) Federico Iannaccone (Italy) Fausto Tabacco	3	3
(Spain) Àlex Martínez (Poland) Piotr Pawlak	6	6
(Italy) G Fonio (Italy) G Oradini	2	3
4	(Italy) F Forti (Italy) F Romano	w/o
Alt	(Switzerland) R Bertola (Italy) Alessandro Dragoni
(Italy) R Brancaccio (Italy) G Ferrari	3	6	[10]
(United States) Jayson Blando (United States) Michael Blando	6	3	[2]
(Italy) F Arnaboldi (Italy) E Dalla Valle	6	3	[10]
(Italy) Jacopo Bilardo (Italy) A Guerrieri	4	6	[7]
(France) M Janvier (Italy) Augusto Virgili
3	(Netherlands) J Jans (Netherlands) N Visker	w/o
(Italy) F Bondioli (Italy) L Rottoli	5	6	[11]
(Tunisia) Adam Nagoudi (France) Cyril Vandermeersch	7	4	[9]
WC	(Italy) Lorenzo Angelini (Italy) Gabriele Crivellaro	2	4
2	(United Kingdom) C Broom (Czech Republic) D Poljak	6	6

Quarterfinals
1	(Italy) G Ricca (Netherlands) M Veldheer	6	6
(Spain) À Martínez (Poland) P Pawlak	4	4
4	(Italy) F Forti (Italy) F Romano	6	7
(Italy) R Brancaccio (Italy) G Ferrari	1	5
(Italy) F Arnaboldi (Italy) E Dalla Valle	6^{7}	3
3	(Netherlands) J Jans (Netherlands) N Visker	7^{9}	6
(Italy) F Bondioli (Italy) L Rottoli	4	2
2	(United Kingdom) C Broom (Czech Republic) D Poljak	6	6

Semifinals
1	(Italy) G Ricca (Netherlands) M Veldheer	6^{3}	3
4	(Italy) F Forti (Italy) F Romano	7^{7}	6
3	(Netherlands) J Jans (Netherlands) N Visker	5	6	[10]
2	(United Kingdom) C Broom (Czech Republic) D Poljak	7	3	[6]

Final
4	(Italy) F Forti (Italy) F Romano	6^{7}	3
3	(Netherlands) J Jans (Netherlands) N Visker	7^{9}	6
