= 2026 Nonthaburi Challenger II – Doubles =

Doubles
- 2026 Nonthaburi Challenger II

Final
- Champions: (India) Sriram Balaji (Austria) Neil Oberleitner
- Runners-up: (India) Anirudh Chandrasekar (Japan) Takeru Yuzuki
- Score: 6–3, 7–6^{(8–6)}

Events
Singles	Doubles
- Nonthaburi Challenger

Daniel Cukierman and Joel Schwärzler were the defending champions but only Cukierman chose to defend his title, partnering Grégoire Jacq. They lost in the quarterfinals to Arthur Reymond and Luca Sanchez.

Sriram Balaji and Neil Oberleitner won the title after defeating Anirudh Chandrasekar and Takeru Yuzuki 6–3, 7–6^{(8–6)} in the final.

== Seeds ==
1. (India) Sriram Balaji / (Austria) Neil Oberleitner (champions)
2. (India) Anirudh Chandrasekar / (Japan) Takeru Yuzuki (final)
3. (United States) Mac Kiger / (United Kingdom) Joshua Paris (first round)
4. (United States) George Goldhoff / (United States) Reese Stalder (first round)

== Draw ==
Key

- Q = Qualifier
- WC = Wild card
- LL = Lucky loser
- Alt = Alternate
- ITF = ITF entry
- PR = Protected ranking
- SR = Special ranking
- SE = Special exempt
- JE = Junior exempt
- JR = Junior Accelerator Programme entrant
- CO = College Accelerator Programme entrant
- NG = Next Gen Accelerator Program entrant
- w/o = Walkover
- r = Retired
- d = Defaulted

First round
1	(India) S Balaji (Austria) N Oberleitner	6	6
(Japan) Y Shimizu (Japan) N Tajima	4	4
(Netherlands) T Loof (South Korea) J-s Nam	6	7
(Australia) J Charlton (Zimbabwe) CJ Lock	3	5
3	(United States) M Kiger (United Kingdom) J Paris	6^{5}	7	[8]
PR	(Chinese Taipei) J Jung (Japan) K Uesugi	7^{7}	5	[10]
(Poland) K Drzewiecki (India) A Kadhe	3	4
WC	(Thailand) M Jones (Thailand) W Trongcharoenchaikul	6	6
(Israel) D Cukierman (France) G Jacq	6	6
(India) S Banthia (Japan) S Watanabe	4	2
(France) A Reymond (France) L Sanchez	6	6^{5}	[10]
4	(United States) G Goldhoff (United States) R Stalder	1	7^{7}	[2]
(Thailand) P Isaro (India) N Kaliyanda Poonacha	7^{7}	5	[10]
WC	(Thailand) Thanapet Chanta (Thailand) K Samrej	6^{3}	7	[7]
(Colombia) N Barrientos (United States) B Kittay	6^{4}	6^{5}
2	(India) A Chandrasekar (Japan) T Yuzuki	7^{7}	7^{7}

Quarterfinals
1	(India) S Balaji (Austria) N Oberleitner	7^{8}	6
(Netherlands) T Loof (South Korea) J-s Nam	6^{6}	4
PR	(Chinese Taipei) J Jung (Japan) K Uesugi
WC	(Thailand) M Jones (Thailand) W Trongcharoenchaikul	w/o
(Israel) D Cukierman (France) G Jacq	6	3	[4]
(France) A Reymond (France) L Sanchez	2	6	[10]
(Thailand) P Isaro (India) N Kaliyanda Poonacha	3	4
2	(India) A Chandrasekar (Japan) T Yuzuki	6	6

Semifinals
1	(India) S Balaji (Austria) N Oberleitner	w/o
WC	(Thailand) M Jones (Thailand) W Trongcharoenchaikul
(France) A Reymond (France) L Sanchez	6^{4}	6^{3}
2	(India) A Chandrasekar (Japan) T Yuzuki	7^{7}	7^{7}

Final
1	(India) S Balaji (Austria) N Oberleitner	6	7^{8}
2	(India) A Chandrasekar (Japan) T Yuzuki	3	6^{6}
