= 2026 Côte d'Ivoire Open =

- Date: 20–26 April
- Edition: 3rd
- Surface: Hard
- Location: Abidjan, Ivory Coast

Champions

Singles
- (Belgium) Gauthier Onclin

Doubles
- (Belgium) Michael Geerts / (Netherlands) Niels Visker
- Côte d'Ivoire Open

The 2026 Côte d'Ivoire Open was a professional tennis tournament played on hard courts. It was the third edition of the tournament which was part of the 2026 ATP Challenger Tour. It took place in Abidjan, Ivory Coast between 20 and 26 April 2026.

== Singles main-draw entrants ==
=== Seeds ===
Country	Player	Rank^{1}	Seed
BEL	Gauthier Onclin	247	1
CIV	Eliakim Coulibaly	280	2
FRA	Florent Bax	281	3
GBR	Paul Jubb	284	4
BEL	Michael Geerts	286	5
POL	Maks Kaśnikowski	318	6
JAM	Blaise Bicknell	331	7
TUR	Mert Alkaya	352	8

- ^{1} Rankings as of 13 April 2026.

=== Other entrants ===
The following players received wildcards into the singles main draw:

- (Morocco) Karim Bennani
- (France) Maxime Chazal
- (France) Calvin Hemery

The following players received entry from the qualifying draw:

- (Algeria) Samir Hamza Reguig
- (United States) Matt Kuhar
- (Morocco) Younes Lalami
- (Denmark) Oskar Brostrøm Poulsen
- (Germany) Jeremy Schifris
- (United Kingdom) Oscar Weightman

== Champions ==
=== Singles ===
- (Belgium) Gauthier Onclin def. (United Kingdom) Hamish Stewart 7–6^{(7–5)}, 7–6^{(7–2)}.

=== Doubles ===
- (Belgium) Michael Geerts / (Netherlands) Niels Visker def. (Ivory Coast) Eliakim Coulibaly / (France) Calvin Hemery 6–3, 7–6^{(7–4)}.
