= 2026 Trofeo Città di Cesenatico – Singles =

Singles
- 2026 Trofeo Città di Cesenatico

Final
- Champion: (Ukraine) Oleg Prihodko
- Runner-up: (Italy) Raúl Brancaccio
- Score: 6–7^{(8–10)}, 6–4, 6–4

Events
Singles	Doubles
- Trofeo Città di Cesenatico

This was the first edition of the tournament.

Oleg Prihodko won the title after defeating Raúl Brancaccio 6–7^{(8–10)}, 6–4, 6–4 in the final.

== Seeds ==
1. (Estonia) Daniil Glinka (withdrew)
2. (Switzerland) Rémy Bertola (first round)
3. (France) Calvin Hemery (first round)
4. Ivan Gakhov (semifinals)
5. (United Kingdom) Charles Broom (second round)
6. (Austria) Sandro Kopp (first round)
7. (Czech Republic) Petr Brunclík (quarterfinals)
8. (Switzerland) Kilian Feldbausch (second round)

== Draw ==
Key

- Q = Qualifier
- WC = Wild card
- LL = Lucky loser
- Alt = Alternate
- ITF = ITF entry
- PR = Protected ranking
- SR = Special ranking
- SE = Special exempt
- JE = Junior exempt
- JR = Junior Accelerator Programme entrant
- CO = College Accelerator Programme entrant
- NG = Next Gen Accelerator Program entrant
- w/o = Walkover
- r = Retired
- d = Defaulted

=== Finals ===
Semifinals
(Ukraine) Oleg Prihodko	6	7^{8}
4	Ivan Gakhov	3	6^{6}
(Italy) Raúl Brancaccio	6	6
WC	(Italy) Filippo Romano	4	3

Final
(Ukraine) Oleg Prihodko	6^{8}	6	6
(Italy) Raúl Brancaccio	7^{10}	4	4

=== Top half ===
First round
Q	(Italy) Lorenzo Angelini	4	6	4
Q	(Italy) L Rottoli	6	4	6
(Ukraine) O Prihodko	6	4	6
(Italy) F Bondioli	4	6	4
Q	(Italy) Michele Mecarelli	6	3	0^{r}
Q	(Italy) Federico Iannaccone	3	6	3
LL	(Croatia) Josip Šimundža	5	1
8	(Switzerland) K Feldbausch	7	6
4	I Gakhov	5	7	7
(Italy) F Arnaboldi	7	5	5
WC	(Italy) F Forti	6	6
WC	(Italy) Pierluigi Basile	4	3
Alt	(Italy) A Guerrieri	3	6^{6}
Q	(Netherlands) N Visker	6	7^{8}
(Italy) G Ferrari	3	4
7	(Czech Republic) Petr Brunclík	6	6

Second round
Q	(Italy) L Rottoli	2	0
(Ukraine) O Prihodko	6	6
Q	(Italy) F Iannaccone	6	6
8	(Switzerland) K Feldbausch	3	4
4	I Gakhov	7^{7}	4	7^{7}
WC	(Italy) F Forti	6^{4}	6	6^{4}
Q	(Netherlands) N Visker	4	6^{3}
7	(Czech Republic) P Brunclík	6	7^{7}

Quarterfinals
(Ukraine) O Prihodko	6	7^{7}
Q	(Italy) F Iannaccone	0	6^{3}
4	I Gakhov	6	7^{7}
7	(Czech Republic) P Brunclík	4	6^{3}

Semifinals
(Ukraine) O Prihodko	6	7^{8}
4	I Gakhov	3	6^{6}

=== Bottom half ===
First round
6	(Austria) S Kopp	3	1
Alt	(Italy) Pietro Fellin	6	6
(Italy) G Fonio	4	4
Svyatoslav Gulin	6	6
Alt	(France) L Lokoli	7^{9}	7^{7}
(Italy) CA Caniato	6^{7}	6^{4}
(Italy) R Brancaccio	6	7^{7}
3	(France) C Hemery	4	6^{4}
5	(United Kingdom) C Broom	7	6
(Italy) S Napolitano	5	4
(Spain) Àlex Martínez	6^{5}	4
WC	(Italy) F Romano	7^{7}	6
(Moldova) R Albot	3	5
(France) Cyril Vandermeersch	6	7
Q	(Italy) E Dalla Valle	4	7^{10}	6
2	(Switzerland) R Bertola	6	6^{8}	2

Second round
Alt	(Italy) P Fellin	6	7^{7}
S Gulin	2	6^{5}
Alt	(France) L Lokoli	4	3
(Italy) R Brancaccio	6	6
5	(United Kingdom) C Broom	5	3
WC	(Italy) F Romano	7	6
(France) C Vandermeersch	4	4
Q	(Italy) E Dalla Valle	6	6

Quarterfinals
Alt	(Italy) P Fellin	1	3
(Italy) R Brancaccio	6	6
WC	(Italy) F Romano	7^{7}	6
Q	(Italy) E Dalla Valle	6^{4}	3

Semifinals
(Italy) R Brancaccio	6	6
WC	(Italy) F Romano	4	3
