= 2026 Côte d'Ivoire Open II =

- Date: 27 April – 3 May
- Edition: 4th
- Surface: Hard
- Location: Abidjan, Ivory Coast

Champions

Singles
- (Belgium) Gauthier Onclin

Doubles
- (Denmark) Oskar Brostrøm Poulsen / (United States) Billy Suarez
- Côte d'Ivoire Open

The 2026 Côte d'Ivoire Open II was a professional tennis tournament played on hard courts. It was the fourth edition of the tournament which was part of the 2026 ATP Challenger Tour. It took place in Abidjan, Ivory Coast between 27 April and 3 May 2026.

== Singles main-draw entrants ==
=== Seeds ===
Country	Player	Rank^{1}	Seed
BEL	Gauthier Onclin	246	1
USA	Michael Mmoh	248	2
FRA	Florent Bax	265	3
CIV	Eliakim Coulibaly	275	4
GBR	Paul Jubb	280	5
BEL	Michael Geerts	292	6
POL	Maks Kaśnikowski	321	7
JAM	Blaise Bicknell	334	8

- ^{1} Rankings as of 20 April 2026.

=== Other entrants ===
The following players received wildcards into the singles main draw:

- (Morocco) Karim Bennani
- (France) César Bouchelaghem
- (Morocco) Younes Lalami

The following players received entry into the singles main draw as alternates:

- (France) Constantin Bittoun Kouzmine
- (India) Digvijaypratap Singh

The following players received entry from the qualifying draw:

- (Italy) Massimo Giunta
- (United Kingdom) Millen Hurrion
- (Spain) Iván Marrero Curbelo
- (France) Elijah Sanogo
- (India) Aditya Vishal Balsekar
- (United Kingdom) Oscar Weightman

The following player received entry as a lucky loser:

- (Denmark) Oksar Brostrøm Poulsen

== Champions ==
=== Singles ===
- (Belgium) Gauthier Onclin def. (United States) Michael Mmoh 6–3, 6–4.

=== Doubles ===
- (Denmark) Oskar Brostrøm Poulsen / (United States) Billy Suarez def. (France) Constantin Bittoun Kouzmine / (Latvia) Robert Strombachs 7–6^{(7–0)}, 6–0.
