= 2026 Trofeo Città di Cesenatico =

- Date: 2 – 8 February
- Edition: 1st
- Surface: Hard (indoor)
- Location: Cesenatico, Italy

Champions

Singles
- (Ukraine) Oleg Prihodko

Doubles
- (Netherlands) Jarno Jans / (Netherlands) Niels Visker
- Trofeo Città di Cesenatico

The 2026 Start Romagna Cup - 1° Trofeo Città di Cesenatico was a professional tennis tournament played on indoor hardcourts. It was the first edition of the tournament which was part of the 2026 ATP Challenger Tour. It took place in Cesenatico, Italy from 2 to 8 February 2026.

== Singles main-draw entrants ==
=== Seeds ===
Country	Player	Rank^{1}	Seed
~~EST~~	~~Daniil Glinka~~	~~200~~	~~1~~
SUI	Rémy Bertola	254	2
FRA	Calvin Hemery	260	3
	Ivan Gakhov	263	4
GBR	Charles Broom	304	5
AUT	Sandro Kopp	310	6
CZE	Petr Brunclík	313	7
SUI	Kilian Feldbausch	379	8

- ^{1} Rankings are as of 19 January 2026.

=== Other entrants ===
The following players received wildcards into the singles main draw:

- (Italy) Pierluigi Basile
- (Italy) Francesco Forti
- (Italy) Filippo Romano

The following players received entry into the singles main draw as alternates:

- (Italy) Pietro Fellin
- (Italy) Andrea Guerrieri
- (France) Laurent Lokoli

The following players received entry from the qualifying draw:

- (Italy) Lorenzo Angelini
- (Italy) Enrico Dalla Valle
- (Italy) Federico Iannaccone
- (Italy) Michele Mecarelli
- (Italy) Lorenzo Rottoli
- (Netherlands) Niels Visker

The following player received entry as a lucky loser:

- (Croatia) Josip Šimundža

== Champions ==
=== Singles ===
- (Ukraine) Oleg Prihodko def. (Italy) Raúl Brancaccio 6–7^{(8–10)}, 6–4, 6–4.

=== Doubles ===
- (Netherlands) Jarno Jans / (Netherlands) Niels Visker def. (Italy) Francesco Forti / (Italy) Filippo Romano 7–6^{(9–7)}, 6–3.
