= 2026 Nonthaburi Challenger II – Singles =

Singles
- 2026 Nonthaburi Challenger II

Final
- Champion: (Spain) Pol Martín Tiffon
- Runner-up: (Thailand) Maximus Jones
- Score: 6–4, 3–6, 6–4

Events
Singles	Doubles
- Nonthaburi Challenger

Rio Noguchi was the defending champion but lost in the semifinals to Maximus Jones.

Pol Martín Tiffon won the title after defeating Jones 6–4, 3–6, 6–4 in the final.

== Seeds ==
1. (Japan) Rio Noguchi (semifinals)
2. (Kazakhstan) Timofey Skatov (semifinals)
3. (China) Zhou Yi (quarterfinals)
4. (Poland) Daniel Michalski (second round)
5. (Japan) Kaichi Uchida (second round)
6. (Austria) Joel Schwärzler (first round)
7. (United States) Andres Martin (first round)
8. (China) Sun Fajing (first round)

== Draw ==
Key

- Q = Qualifier
- WC = Wild card
- LL = Lucky loser
- Alt = Alternate
- ITF = ITF entry
- PR = Protected ranking
- SR = Special ranking
- SE = Special exempt
- JE = Junior exempt
- JR = Junior Accelerator Programme entrant
- CO = College Accelerator Programme entrant
- NG = Next Gen Accelerator Program entrant
- w/o = Walkover
- r = Retired
- d = Defaulted

=== Finals ===
Semifinals
1	(Japan) Rio Noguchi	6	1	2
WC	(Thailand) Maximus Jones	4	6	6
(Spain) Pol Martín Tiffon	6	6
2	(Kazakhstan) Timofey Skatov	2	4

Final
WC	(Thailand) Maximus Jones	4	6	4
(Spain) Pol Martín Tiffon	6	3	6

=== Top half ===
First round
1	(Japan) R Noguchi	6	6
(Greece) S Sakellaridis	4	2
WC	(Thailand) W Trongcharoenchaikul	1	3
(India) S Nagal	6	6
Q	(Czech Republic) M Gengel	6^{3}	6	6
(Japan) Renta Tokuda	7^{7}	0	4
Q	(Japan) Y Uchiyama	6	6
7	(United States) A Martin	3	1
3	(China) Y Zhou	6	6
Q	(Austria) N Oberleitner	3	1
(China) J Cui	6^{5}	2
Q	(United States) Christian Langmo	7^{7}	6
P Bar Biryukov	5	6	7^{7}
(France) M Martineau	7	3	6^{2}
WC	(Thailand) M Jones	1	6	6
6	(Austria) J Schwärzler	6	3	0

Second round
1	(Japan) R Noguchi	2
(India) S Nagal	2^{r}
Q	(Czech Republic) M Gengel	6	7
Q	(Japan) Y Uchiyama	4	5
3	(China) Y Zhou	6	6
Q	(United States) C Langmo	3	4
P Bar Biryukov	2	0^{r}
WC	(Thailand) M Jones	6	3

Quarterfinals
1	(Japan) R Noguchi	4	7^{7}	7
Q	(Czech Republic) M Gengel	6	6^{3}	5
3	(China) Y Zhou	6	6^{4}	4
WC	(Thailand) M Jones	4	7^{7}	6

Semifinals
1	(Japan) R Noguchi	6	1	2
WC	(Thailand) M Jones	4	6	6

=== Bottom half ===
First round
5	(Japan) K Uchida	3	7	6
(France) R Bertrand	6	5	1
Q	(South Africa) P Henning	6	5	0^{r}
(Spain) P Martín Tiffon	4	7	2
M Sharipov	6	6
Q	(South Korea) H Chung	3	2
(Japan) Y Shimizu	2	6	3
4	(Poland) D Michalski	6	2	6
8	(China) F Sun	4	1
(Kazakhstan) B Zhukayev	6	6
LL	(United States) Andre Ilagan	4	6^{3}
(France) F Bax	6	7^{7}
(Japan) J Trotter	6	3	4
WC	(Thailand) K Samrej	4	6	6
(Croatia) D Ajduković	3	6	4
2	(Kazakhstan) T Skatov	6	3	6

Second round
5	(Japan) K Uchida	3	3
(Spain) P Martín Tiffon	6	6
M Sharipov	6	6
4	(Poland) D Michalski	4	3
(Kazakhstan) B Zhukayev	2	4
(France) F Bax	6	6
WC	(Thailand) K Samrej	4	2
2	(Kazakhstan) T Skatov	6	6

Quarterfinals
(Spain) P Martín Tiffon	2	6	7^{15}
M Sharipov	6	2	6^{13}
(France) F Bax	2	4
2	(Kazakhstan) T Skatov	6	6

Semifinals
(Spain) P Martín Tiffon	6	6
2	(Kazakhstan) T Skatov	2	4
