= 2026 Nonthaburi Challenger II =

- Date: 12 – 17 January
- Edition: 15th
- Surface: Hard
- Location: Nonthaburi, Thailand

Champions

Singles
- (Spain) Pol Martín Tiffon

Doubles
- (India) Sriram Balaji / (Austria) Neil Oberleitner
- Nonthaburi Challenger

The 2026 Nonthaburi Challenger II was a professional tennis tournament played on hard courts. It was the 15th edition of the tournament which was part of the 2026 ATP Challenger Tour. It took place in Nonthaburi, Thailand from 12 to 17 January 2026.

== Singles main-draw entrants ==
=== Seeds ===
Country	Player	Rank^{1}	Seed
JPN	Rio Noguchi	227	1
KAZ	Timofey Skatov	235	2
CHN	Zhou Yi	248	3
POL	Daniel Michalski	249	4
JPN	Kaichi Uchida	251	5
AUT	Joel Schwärzler	254	6
USA	Andres Martin	269	7
CHN	Sun Fajing	274	8

- ^{1} Rankings are as of 5 January 2026.

=== Other entrants ===
The following players received wildcards into the singles main draw:

- (Thailand) Maximus Jones
- (Thailand) Kasidit Samrej
- (Thailand) Wishaya Trongcharoenchaikul

The following player received entry into the singles main draw using a protected ranking:

- (Chinese Taipei) ~~Jason Jung~~

The following players received entry from the qualifying draw:

- (South Korea) Chung Hyeon
- (Czech Republic) Marek Gengel
- (South Africa) Philip Henning
- (United States) Christian Langmo
- (Austria) Neil Oberleitner
- (Japan) Yasutaka Uchiyama

The following player received entry as a lucky loser:

- (United States) Andre Ilagan

== Champions ==
=== Singles ===
- (Spain) Pol Martín Tiffon def. (Thailand) Maximus Jones 6–4, 3–6, 6–4.

=== Doubles ===
- (India) Sriram Balaji / (Austria) Neil Oberleitner def. (India) Anirudh Chandrasekar / (Japan) Takeru Yuzuki 6–3, 7–6^{(8–6)}.
