= Trofeo Città di Cesenatico =

- 2026 Trofeo Città di Cesenatico

ATP Challenger Tour
- Event name: Start Romagna Cup - Trofeo Città di Cesenatico
- Location: Cesenatico, Italy
- Venue: Circolo Tennis "A. Godio" Cesenatico
- Category: ATP Challenger Tour
- Surface: Hard (indoor)
- Website: tennisromagna.com

The Start Romagna Cup - Trofeo Città di Cesenatico is a professional tennis tournament played on indoor hardcourts. It is currently part of the ATP Challenger Tour. It was first held in Cesenatico, Italy in 2026.

== Past finals ==
=== Singles ===
Year	Champion	Runner-up	Score
2026	(Ukraine) Oleg Prihodko	(Italy) Raúl Brancaccio	6–7^{(8–10)}, 6–4, 6–4

=== Doubles ===
Year	Champions	Runners-up	Score
2026	(Netherlands) Jarno Jans (Netherlands) Niels Visker	(Italy) Francesco Forti (Italy) Filippo Romano	7–6^{(9–7)}, 6–3
