= Robert Strombachs =

Latvian tennis player

- Country (sports): Germany; Latvia (Davis Cup)
- Residence: Berlin, Germany
- Born: 15 September 1999 (age 27) Berlin, Germany
- Height: 1.91 m (6 ft 3 in)
- Plays: Right-handed
- Coach: Armand Strombach
- Prize money: US $185,521

Singles
- Career record: 7–4 (at ATP Tour level, Grand Slam level, and in Davis Cup)
- Career titles: 7 ITF
- Highest ranking: No. 321 (23 June 2025)
- Current ranking: No. 349 (26 October 2026)

Doubles
- Career record: 2–5 (at ATP Tour level, Grand Slam level, and in Davis Cup)
- Career titles: 10 ITF
- Highest ranking: No. 226 (26 October 2026)
- Current ranking: No. 226 (26 October 2026)
- Last updated on: 26 October 2026.

Robert Strombachs (Latvian: Roberts Štrombahs; born 15 September 1999) is a Latvian-German tennis player. He has a career high ATP singles ranking of world No. 321 achieved on 23 June 2025 and a career high doubles ranking of No. 226 achieved on 26 October 2026. He is currently the No. 1 Latvian player.

Strombachs represents Latvia at the Davis Cup, where he has a W/L record of 7–6.

== ATP Challenger and ITF Tour finals ==
=== Singles: 22 (11–11) ===
Legend ATP Challenger Tour (0–0) ITF Futures/World Tennis Tour (11–11)	Finals by surface Hard (11–11) Clay (0–0) Grass (0–0)

Result	W–L	Date	Tournament	Tier	Surface	Opponent	Score
Win	1–0	Sep 2018	Tunisia F33, Monastir	Futures	Hard	(Russia) Dimitriy Voronin	6–4, 7–6^{(7–5)}
Win	2–0	Oct 2018	Tunisia F35, Monastir	Futures	Hard	(Russia) Alexey Zakharov	6–4, 6–0
Loss	2–1	Sep 2019	M15 Pajulahti, Finland	World Tennis Tour	Hard	(Russia) Savriyan Danilov	7–6^{(7–2)}, 4–6, 3–6
Win	3–1	Jun 2022	M15 Ra'anana, Israel	World Tennis Tour	Hard	(Israel) Edan Leshem	7–6^{(7–4)}, 6–4
Win	4–1	Nov 2022	M15 Monastir, Tunisia	World Tennis Tour	Hard	(Poland) Olaf Pieczkowski	6–1, 6–2
Loss	4–2	Dec 2022	M15 Sharm El Sheikh, Egypt	World Tennis Tour	Hard	(Czech Republic) Jakub Menšík	4–6, 0–6
Loss	4–3	Feb 2023	M15 Sharm El Sheikh, Egypt	World Tennis Tour	Hard	Marat Sharipov	6–3, 2–6, 3–6
Win	5–3	Mar 2023	M15 Sharm El Sheikh, Egypt	World Tennis Tour	Hard	(Egypt) Mohamed Safwat	6–2, 6–3
Loss	5–4	Apr 2023	M25 Sanxenxo, Spain	World Tennis Tour	Hard	(China) Te Rigele	6–7^{(5–7)}, 6–3, 6–7^{(4–7)}
Win	6–4	Nov 2023	M25 Sharm El Sheikh, Egypt	World Tennis Tour	Hard	Petr Bar Biryukov	6–7^{(4–7)}, 6–4, 3–0 ret.
Loss	6–5	Nov 2023	M25 Monastir, Tunisia	World Tennis Tour	Hard	(Lebanon) Hady Habib	4–6, 4–6
Loss	6–6	Oct 2024	M15 Sharm El Sheikh, Egypt	World Tennis Tour	Hard	(Czech Republic) Marek Gengel	4–6, 6–2, 5–7
Loss	6–7	Oct 2024	M15 Sharm El Sheikh, Egypt	World Tennis Tour	Hard	(Czech Republic) Marek Gengel	4–6, 6–7^{(0–7)}
Loss	6–8	Nov 2024	M15 Luanda, Angola	World Tennis Tour	Hard	(Australia) Oliver Anderson	4–6, 6–3, 6–7^{(5–7)}
Win	7–8	Nov 2024	M15 Luanda, Angola	World Tennis Tour	Hard	(Czech Republic) Dominik Palán	6–3, 6–2
Win	8–8	Dec 2024	M15 Ceuta, Spain	World Tennis Tour	Hard	(France) Mathias Bourgue	6–2, 6–3
Win	9–8	Mar 2025	M15 Sharm El Sheikh, Egypt	World Tennis Tour	Hard	(France) Moïse Kouamé	6–3, 6–2
Win	10–8	Apr 2025	M15 Monastir, Tunisia	World Tennis Tour	Hard	(Tunisia) Moez Echargui	6–1, 4–6, 6–1
Loss	10–9	Apr 2025	M15 Monastir, Tunisia	World Tennis Tour	Hard	(United Kingdom) Giles Hussey	6–3, 6–7^{(2–7)}, 4–6
Win	11–9	Nov 2025	M25 Luanda, Angola	World Tennis Tour	Hard	(Netherlands) Max Houkes	7–6^{(7–2)}, 4–6, 6–4
Loss	11–10	Mar 2026	M15 Sharm El Sheikh, Egypt	World Tennis Tour	Hard	(Czech Republic) Marek Gengel	6–7^{(5–7)}, 6–7^{(6–8)}
Loss	11–11	Apr 2026	M25 Sharm El Sheikh, Egypt	World Tennis Tour	Hard	(Australia) Thomas Fancutt	3–6, 6–7^{(3–7)}

=== Doubles: 29 (15–14) ===
Legend ATP Challenger Tour (1–1) ITF Futures/World Tennis Tour (14–13)	Finals by surface Hard (11–13) Clay (4–1) Grass (0–0)

Result	W–L	Date	Tournament	Tier	Surface	Partner	Opponents	Score
Win	1–0	Jun 2018	Germany F5, Kamen	Futures	Clay	(Spain) Marco Neubau	(Czech Republic) Petr Nouza (Czech Republic) David Škoch	6–4, 3–6, [10–5]
Loss	1–1	Jul 2018	Germany F6, Saarlouis	Futures	Clay	(Spain) Marco Neubau	(Argentina) Santiago Besada (Argentina) Juan Ignacio Galarza	4–6, 6–4, [8–10]
Win	2–1	Oct 2018	Tunisia F34, Monastir	Futures	Hard	(Brazil) Bernardo Azevedo	(Croatia) Duje Ajduković (Greece) Petros Tsitsipas	6–4, 6–7^{(6–8)}, [10–6]
Win	3–1	Oct 2018	Tunisia F35, Monastir	Futures	Hard	(Brazil) Bernardo Azevedo	(France) Quentin Robert (France) Hugo Schott	3–6, 6–3, [10–1]
Win	4–1	May 2019	M25 Doboj, Bosnia and Herzegovina	World Tennis Tour	Clay	(Germany) Elmar Ejupovic	(Montenegro) Ljubomir Čelebić (Bosnia and Herzegovina) Nerman Fatić	Walkover
Loss	4–2	Jun 2019	M15 Setúbal, Portugal	World Tennis Tour	Hard	(Italy) Erik Crepaldi	(United States) Henry Craig (Bulgaria) Simon Anthony Ivanov	4–6, 6–4, [6–10]
Loss	4–3	Jul 2019	M15 Idanha-a-Nova, Portugal	World Tennis Tour	Hard	(Portugal) Francisco Cabral	(Portugal) Francisco Dias (Portugal) Gonçalo Falcão	7–5, 4–6, [10–12]
Win	5–3	Nov 2020	M15 Heraklion, Greece	World Tennis Tour	Hard	(Germany) Timo Stodder	(Austria) Lucas Miedler (Austria) Neil Oberleitner	6–4, 6–4
Loss	5–4	Feb 2021	M15 Sharm El Sheikh, Egypt	World Tennis Tour	Hard	(Latvia) Mārtiņš Podžus	(Chinese Taipei) Hsu Yu-hsiou (Japan) Jumpei Yamasaki	3–6, 7–5, [7–10]
Loss	5–5	Sep 2021	M15 Monastir, Tunisia	World Tennis Tour	Hard	(Brazil) Gabriel Décamps	(Italy) Mattia Bellucci (New Zealand) Ajeet Rai	6–7^{(1–7)}, 7–6^{(7–5)}, [4–10]
Win	6–5	Apr 2022	M15 Antalya, Turkey	World Tennis Tour	Clay	(Germany) Kai Wehnelt	(Romania) Vladimir Filip (Sweden) Dragoș Nicolae Mădăraș	6–2, 6–4
Loss	6–6	Jun 2022	M15 Vaasa, Finland	World Tennis Tour	Hard	(Syria) Hazem Naw	(Finland) Eero Vasa (Finland) Iiro Vasa	3–6, 4–6
Loss	6–7	Jun 2022	M15 Ra'anana, Israel	World Tennis Tour	Hard	(Latvia) Kārlis Ozoliņš	(Switzerland) Adrian Bodmer (Switzerland) Luca Castelnuovo	4–6, 3–6
Loss	6–8	Oct 2022	M15 Pärnu, Estonia	World Tennis Tour	Hard	(United Kingdom) Daniel Little	(Poland) Szymon Kielan (Poland) Yann Wójcik	4–6, 6–7^{(5–7)}
Win	7–8	Nov 2022	M15 Sëlva, Italy	World Tennis Tour	Hard	(Germany) Leopold Zima	(Netherlands) Mick Veldheer (Germany) Lewie Lane	6–4, 6–4
Loss	7–9	Nov 2022	M15 Monastir, Tunisia	World Tennis Tour	Hard	(Poland) Olaf Pieczkowski	(Chinese Taipei) Ray Ho (Thailand) Maximus Jones	6–4, 6–7^{(3–7)}, [5–10]
Win	8–9	Jun 2024	M15 Wrocław, Poland	World Tennis Tour	Clay	(Ukraine) Nikita Mashtakov	(Poland) Szymon Walków (Poland) Kacper Żuk	7–6^{(7–5)}, 7–5
Win	9–9	Nov 2024	M15 Luanda, Angola	World Tennis Tour	Hard	(Germany) Kai Wehnelt	(Austria) Gregor Ramskogler (Poland) Jasza Szajrych	6–3, 6–7^{(5–7)}, [10–7]
Win	10–9	Dec 2024	M15 Luanda, Angola	World Tennis Tour	Hard	(Germany) Kai Wehnelt	(Austria) Gregor Ramskogler (Poland) Jasza Szajrych	6–1, 6–1
Loss	10–10	Apr 2025	M15 Monastir, Tunisia	World Tennis Tour	Hard	(Slovakia) Lukáš Pokorný	(Belgium) Buvaysar Gadamauri (Greece) Dimitris Sakellaridis	3–6, 3–6
Win	11–10	Oct 2025	M15 Monastir, Tunisia	World Tennis Tour	Hard	(Estonia) Johannes Seeman	(United Kingdom) Jeremy Gschwendtner (Italy) Federico Valle	6–4, 7–6^{(7–4)}
Win	12–10	Nov 2025	M25 Luanda, Angola	World Tennis Tour	Hard	(Germany) Kai Wehnelt	(Poland) Alan Bojarski (Morocco) Yassine Smiej	6–3, 6–1
Win	13–10	Nov 2025	M25 Luanda, Angola	World Tennis Tour	Hard	(Germany) Kai Wehnelt	(France) Sven Corbinais (Belgium) Nicolas Ifi	6–2, 6–4
Win	14–10	Feb 2026	M15 San José, Costa Rica	World Tennis Tour	Hard	(Estonia) Johannes Seeman	(Colombia) Juan Miguel Bolívar Idárraga (El Salvador) Juan Carlos Fuentes Vásquez	6–4, 4–6, [10–8]
Loss	14–11	Mar 2026	M15 Sharm El Sheikh, Egypt	World Tennis Tour	Hard	(Ukraine) Volodymyr Uzhylovskyi	(Lithuania) Justas Trainauskas (Lithuania) Pijus Vaitiekūnas	6–4, 2–6, [2–10]
Loss	14–12	Mar 2026	M15 Sharm El Sheikh, Egypt	World Tennis Tour	Hard	(Ukraine) Volodymyr Uzhylovskyi	(Netherlands) Pieter De Lange (Germany) Sydney Zick	3–6, 6–2, [8–10]
Loss	14–13	Mar 2026	M15 Sharm El Sheikh, Egypt	World Tennis Tour	Hard	(France) Constantin Bittoun Kouzmine	Timofei Derepasko (Czech Republic) Daniel Siniakov	4–6, 6–7^{(5–7)}
Loss	14–14	Apr 2026	Abidjan, Ivory Coast	Challenger	Hard	(France) Constantin Bittoun Kouzmine	(Denmark) Oskar Brostrøm Poulsen (United States) Billy Suarez	6–7^{(0–7)}, 0–6
Win	15–14	May 2026	Centurion, South Africa	Challenger	Hard	(France) Constantin Bittoun Kouzmine	(Turkey) Mert Alkaya (Turkey) Arda Azkara	6–4, 6–4
