= Jarno Jans =

Dutch tennis player (born 2000)

- Country (sports): Netherlands
- Born: 7 June 2000 (age 26) Groningen, Netherlands
- Height: 1.93 m (6 ft 4 in)
- Plays: Right-handed (two-handed backhand)
- Coach: Floris Kilian
- Prize money: US $65,270

Singles
- Career record: 0–0 (at ATP Tour level, Grand Slam level, and in Davis Cup)
- Career titles: 0
- Highest ranking: No. 792 (26 December 2022)
- Current ranking: No. 1,921 (16 November 2026)

Doubles
- Career record: 0–0 (at ATP Tour level, Grand Slam level, and in Davis Cup)
- Career titles: 1 Challenger, 14 ITF
- Highest ranking: No. 94 (16 November 2026)
- Current ranking: No. 94 (16 November 2026)
- Last updated on: 16 November 2026.

Jarno Jans (born 7 June 2000) is a Dutch tennis player. Jans has a career high ATP singles ranking of No. 792 achieved on 26 December 2022 and a career high ATP doubles ranking of No. 94 achieved on 16 November 2026.

Jans has won one ATP Challenger doubles title at the 2026 Trofeo Città di Cesenatico.
