= Hamish Stewart (tennis) =

Scottish tennis player (born 1999)

- Country (sports): United Kingdom; Scotland (In Commonwealth Games)
- Born: 30 July 1999 (age 27) Glasgow, Scotland
- Height: 1.93 m (6 ft 4 in)
- Plays: Right-handed (two handed backhand)
- College: Tulane; Georgia
- Prize money: US $155,861

Singles
- Career record: 0–1 (at ATP Tour level, Grand Slam level, and in Davis Cup)
- Highest ranking: No. 300 (29 June 2026)
- Current ranking: No. 300 (29 June 2026)

Grand Slam singles results
- Wimbledon: Q3 (2025)

Doubles
- Career record: 0–0 (at ATP Tour level, Grand Slam level, and in Davis Cup)
- Highest ranking: No. 246 (24 November 2025)
- Current ranking: No. 321 (29 June 2026)
- Last updated on: 29 June 2026.

Hamish Stewart (born 30 July 1999) is a Scottish tennis player. He has a career-high singles ranking of world No. 300 achieved on 29 June 2026 and a career-high doubles ranking of No. 246 achieved on 1 December 2025.

== Biography ==
=== Early career ===
He is from Strathblane in Scotland and later trained in Stirling, Scotland. He played junior tennis at the Wimbledon Championships when he was a teenager in 2017, and won the gold medal at the 2017 Commonwealth Youth Games in The Bahamas for Team Scotland.

He played college tennis in the United States, completing an undergraduate degree at Tulane University and completing a post-graduate course at the University of Georgia in 2022.

=== 2023-2024: Turning pro ===
He was the Tennis Scotland Open Tour Finals men's champion in 2023, before playing a first full season on the professional tour in 2024, finishing the season ranked fifth in Scotland.

=== 2025-2026: ATP debut & Challenger final ===
He won a number of ITF World Tennis Tour singles and doubles titles from January to March 2025, including wins in Bucharest (in singles), Sunderland and Poitiers, before claiming his fourth and fifth doubles titles of the year in back-to-back events in Egypt. In June, he was won a wildcard into men's singles qualifying event at the 2025 Wimbledon Championships having come through the wildcard qualifying play-off, including a win over experienced pro Liam Broady. In the first round of qualifying, he saved a match point before he was awarded a victory after his opponent Valentin Vacherot retired with injury. In the second round he defeated Frenchman Luca Van Assche in three sets before losing in the final qualifying round to Leandro Riedi. In July, he was a semifinalist on the ATP Challenger Tour event in Nottingham, where he was defeated by compatriot Kyle Edmund in the semifinals. In October, playing alongside Harry Wendelken, he reached the final of the men's doubles at the 2025 Open de Vendée in France.

Stewart made it into the singles final at the 2026 Ivory Coast Open, losing to top seed Gauthier Onclin in two tiebreak sets. Ranked at a career-high of No. 301, he made his ATP Tour debut at the 2026 Eastbourne Open as a lucky loser.

== ATP Challenger and ITF World Tennis Tour finals ==
=== Singles: 9 (1–8) ===
Legend (singles) ATP Challenger Tour (0–1) ITF World Tennis Tour (1–7)	Finals by surface Hard (1–6) Clay (0–0) Grass (0–0) Carpet (0–2)

Result	W–L	Date	Tournament	Tier	Surface	Opponent	Score
Loss	0–1	Apr 2026	Côte d'Ivoire Open, Ivory Coast	Challenger	Hard	(Belgium) Gauthier Onclin	6–7^{(5–7)}, 6–7^{(2–7)}
Loss	0–1	Sep 2023	M15 Forbach, France	WTT	Carpet (i)	(Estonia) Daniil Glinka	4–6, 4–6
Loss	0–2	Jan 2024	M25 Sunderland, UK	WTT	Hard (i)	(United Kingdom) Kyle Edmund	5–7, 6–3, 3–6
Loss	0–3	Jan 2025	M15 Cadolzburg, Germany	WTT	Carpet (i)	(Germany) Justin Engel	6–7^{(2–7)}, 3–6
Win	1–3	Feb 2025	M15 Bucharest, Romania	WTT	Hard (i)	(Germany) Nino Ehrenschneider	7–6^{(8–6)}, 7–6^{(7–2)}
Loss	1–4	Mar 2025	M15 Poitiers, France	WTT	Hard (i)	(France) Tristan Lamasine	3–6, 7–6^{(7–0)}, 1–6
Loss	1–5	Mar 2025	M15 Sharm El Sheikh, Egypt	WTT	Hard	(Ukraine) Vadym Ursu	1–6, 6–3, 5–7
Loss	1–6	Sep 2025	M25+H Plaisir, France	WTT	Hard (i)	(Germany) Mats Rosenkranz	3–6, 3–6
Loss	1–7	Apr 2026	M15 Heraklion, Greece	WTT	Hard	(Romania) Gabriel Ghețu	6–7^{(3–7)}, 5–7

=== Doubles: 23 (12–11) ===
Legend (singles) ATP Challenger Tour (0–1) ITF World Tennis Tour (12–10)	Finals by surface Hard (11–10) Clay (0–0) Grass (0–0) Carpet (1–1)

Result	W–L	Date	Tournament	Tier	Surface	Partner	Opponents	Score
Loss	0–1	Oct 2025	Open de Vendée, France	Challenger	Hard	(United Kingdom) Harry Wendelken	(France) Grégoire Jacq (France) Albano Olivetti	6–7^{(5–7)}, 3–6
Win	1–0	Sep 2022	M15 Cancún, Mexico	WTT	Hard	(United States) Tristan McCormick	(Costa Rica) Jesse Flores (Venezuela) Ricardo Rodríguez	6–3, 7–5
Loss	1–1	Sep 2022	M15 Cancún, Mexico	WTT	Hard	(United States) Jake Bhangdia	(Ecuador) Andrés Andrade (India) Siddhant Banthia	7–6^{(7–3)}, 3–6, [8–10]
Loss	1–2	Aug 2023	M25 Herzliya, Israel	WTT	Hard	(Czech Republic) David Poljak	(United Kingdom) James Davis (United Kingdom) Ben Jones	6–7^{(4–7)}, 4–6
Loss	1–3	Aug 2023	M15 Budapest, Hungary	WTT	Hard	(United Kingdom) Finn Murgett	(United Kingdom) James Davis (United Kingdom) Matthew Summers	5–7, 0–6
Loss	1–4	Oct 2023	M25 Glasgow, UK	WTT	Hard (i)	(United Kingdom) George Houghton	(United Kingdom) Finn Bass (United Kingdom) Millen Hurrion	4–6, 7–6^{(7–5)}, [6–10]
Win	2–4	Nov 2023	M15 Alcalá de Henares, Spain	WTT	Hard	(United Kingdom) George Houghton	(Costa Rica) Jesse Flores (Australia) Finn Reynolds	6–4, 6–7^{(3–7)}, [14–12]
Loss	2–5	Apr 2024	M25 Sharm El Sheikh, Egypt	WTT	Hard	(United Kingdom) Harry Wendelken	(United Kingdom) Ben Jones (Switzerland) Jakub Paul	6–2, 4–6, [8–10]
Win	3–5	May 2024	M25 Kachreti, Georgia	WTT	Hard	(United Kingdom) Charles Broom	(Uzbekistan) Denis Istomin; Evgeny Karlovskiy	6–4, 6–4
Loss	3–6	Aug 2024	M15 Budapest, Hungary	WTT	Hard	(United Kingdom) Harry Wendelken	(United States) Phillip Jordan (United States) Karl Poling	4–6, 6–3, [11–13]
Win	4–6	Jan 2025	M25 Sunderland, UK	WTT	Hard (i)	(Czech Republic) David Poljak	(United Kingdom) Giles Hussey (United Kingdom) James Story	walkover
Loss	4–7	Feb 2025	M15 Bucharest, Romania	WTT	Hard (i)	(United Kingdom) Emile Hudd	(Italy) Filippo Romano (Germany) Kai Wehnelt	4–6, 4–6
Loss	4–8	Feb 2025	M15 Lannion, France	WTT	Hard (i)	(United Kingdom) Ben Jones	(France) Axel Garcian (France) Yanis Ghazouani Durand	3–6, 6–7^{(9–11)}
Win	5–8	Mar 2025	M15 Poitiers, France	WTT	Hard (i)	(Finland) Eero Vasa	(France) Axel Garcian (France) Tristan Lamasine	7–5, 7–6^{(7–3)}
Win	6–8	Mar 2025	M25 Créteil, France	WTT	Hard (i)	(Czech Republic) David Poljak	(Netherlands) Mats Hermans (Germany) Tim Rühl	7–6^{(7–1)}, 6–3
Win	7–8	Mar 2025	M15 Sharm El Sheikh, Egypt	WTT	Hard	(Germany) Niklas Schell	(Ukraine) Yurii Dzhavakian (Egypt) Fares Zakaria	6–3, 7–6^{(7–3)}
Win	8–8	Apr 2025	M15 Sharm El Sheikh, Egypt	WTT	Hard	(Egypt) Amr Elsayed	(Finland) Vesa Ahti (Serbia) Viktor Jović	3–6, 6–2, [10–8]
Loss	8–9	Apr 2025	M25 Sharm El Sheikh, Egypt	WTT	Hard	(Czech Republic) David Poljak	Yaroslav Demin (United Kingdom) Ryan Peniston	2–6, 6–3, [9–11]
Win	9–9	Jun 2025	M15 Kayseri, Turkey	WTT	Hard	(United Kingdom) Peter Alam	(France) Constantin Bittoun Kouzmine (United States) Axel Nefve	6–7^{(2–7)}, 7–5, [10–5]
Loss	9–10	Jul 2025	M15 Dublin, Ireland	WTT	Carpet	(United Kingdom) Alastair Gray	(United Kingdom) Finn Bass (United Kingdom) Ben Jones	4–6, 6–7^{(6–8)}
Win	10–10	Oct 2025	M25 Sheffield, UK	WTT	Hard (i)	(United Kingdom) Connor Thomson	(France) Clément Chidekh (United Kingdom) Mark Whitehouse	6–3, 6–4
Win	11–10	Mar 2026	M25 Trimbach, Switzerland	WTT	Carpet (i)	(Germany) Daniel Masur	(Switzerland) Gian Gruenig (Switzerland) Jeffrey von der Schulenburg	6–4, 7–6^{(7–3)}
Win	12–10	Mar 2026	M25 Heraklion, Greece	WTT	Hard	(United Kingdom) Scott Duncan	(United States) Alex Jones (United States) Miles Jones	6–4, 6–2
