= Thijmen Loof =

Dutch tennis player (born 2002)

- Country (sports): Netherlands
- Born: 15 July 2002 (age 24) Den Haag, Netherlands
- Height: 1.96 m (6 ft 5 in)
- Plays: Right-handed, two handed backhand
- Coach: Marvin Cijntje
- Prize money: US $81,642

Singles
- Career record: 0-0
- Career titles: 0
- Highest ranking: No. 961 (21 October 2024)
- Current ranking: No. 1,296 (9 November 2026)

Doubles
- Career record: 0-1
- Career titles: 0
- Highest ranking: No. 117 (9 November 2026)
- Current ranking: No. 117 (9 November 2026)
- Last updated on: 9 November 2026.

Thijmen Loof (born 15 July 2002) is a Dutch tennis player. He has a career high doubles ranking of world No. 117 achieved on 9 November 2026 and a career high singles ranking of world No. 961 achieved on 21 October 2024. He won his first doubles title on the ATP Challenger Tour at the 2025 Côte d'Ivoire Open in Abidjan in April 2025.

== Career ==
He became Dutch doubles champion in the under-16 age group in August 2018, alongside Frank Jonker. In the final, the pair defeated Jesse den Hartog and Jesse de Jager 6-4 7–5.

In August 2024, he was beaten in singles by Cruz Hewitt, in Hewitt's first win at a senior match. He won two doubles titles in Bali in August and September 2024, his fourth and fifth doubles finals of the year. This included teaming up with Tibo Colson to beat Shintaro Imai and Moerani Bouzige in the final of 2024 Amman Mineral Men's World Tennis Championship, in straight sets.

In April 2025, alongside Matt Hulme, he reached the men's doubles final at the 2025 Côte d'Ivoire Open in Abidjan on the Challenger tour, after the retirement in the semi-finals of the pair Ricardas Berankis and Dominik Kellovský, where they defeated the pairing of Frenchman Clement Chidekh and Antiguan Jody Maginley in straight sets, 7–6, 7–4. Throughout the tournament they only lost one set, which was in the round of 16. Speaking after the match, Loof expressed his satisfaction in the mixed zone saying "today was probably our best doubles of the tournament".

== Personal life ==
He is from The Hague in the Netherlands and started playing tennis as a youngster at a club in Bosjes van Pex of which his mother was a member.
