= Gauthier Onclin =

Belgium tennis player (born 2001)

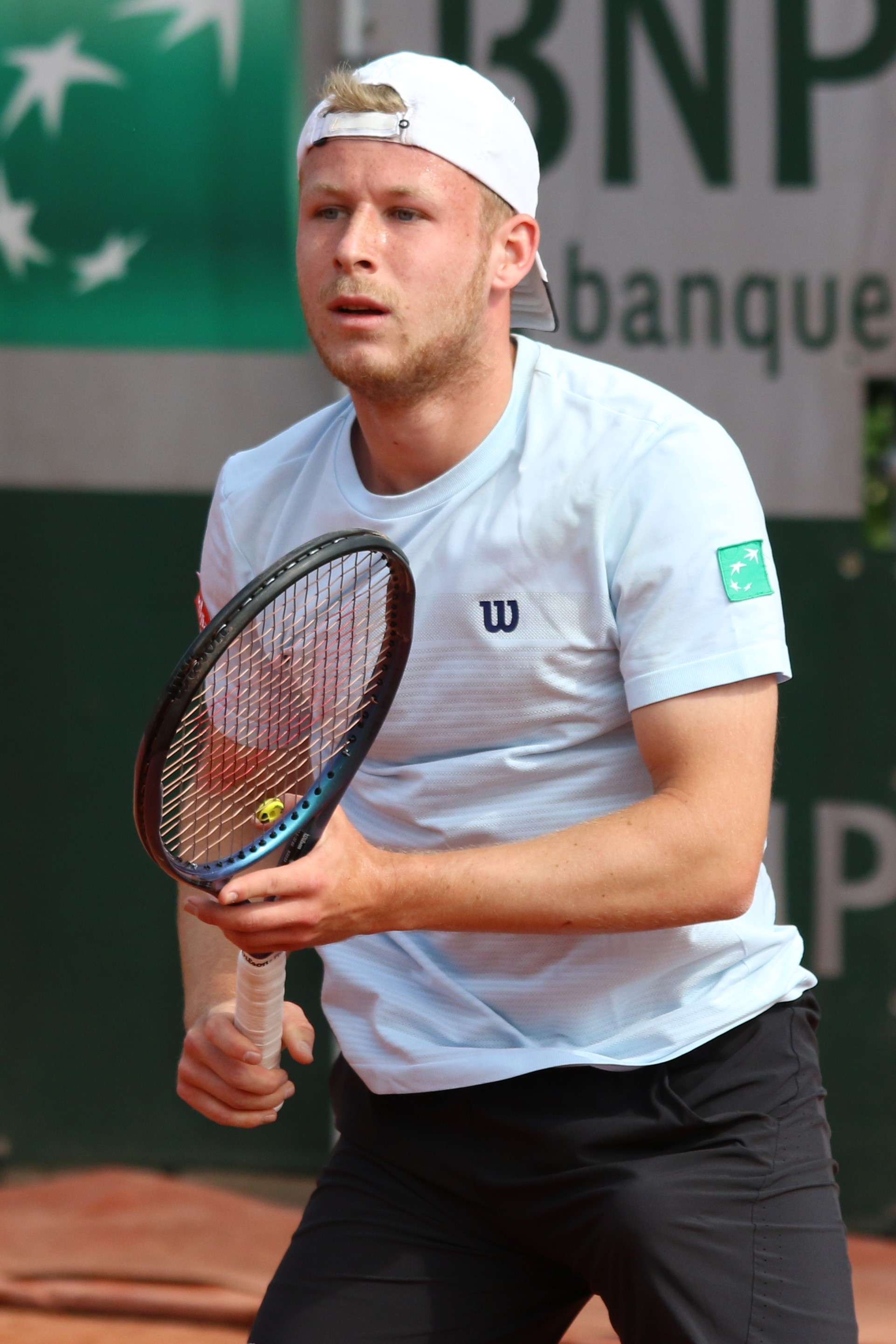
- Country (sports): Belgium
- Born: 26 February 2001 (age 25) Liege, Belgium
- Height: 1.80 m (5 ft 11 in)
- Turned pro: 2022
- Plays: Right-handed (two-handed backhand)
- Coach: Steve Darcis
- Prize money: US $671,749

Singles
- Career record: 1–2
- Career titles: 0
- Highest ranking: No. 158 (24 August 2026)
- Current ranking: No. 158 (24 August 2026)

Grand Slam singles results
- Australian Open: 1R (2025)
- French Open: Q2 (2023)
- Wimbledon: Q2 (2023, 2025, 2026)
- US Open: Q2 (2023)

Doubles
- Career record: 0–1
- Career titles: 0
- Highest ranking: No. 827 (12 April 2021)
- Current ranking: No. 1,489 (24 August 2026)
- Last updated on: 24 August 2026.

Gauthier Onclin (born 26 February 2001) is a Belgian professional tennis player. He has a career-high ATP singles ranking of No. 158 achieved on 24 August 2026 and a doubles ranking of No. 827 achieved on 12 April 2021. Onclin plays mostly on the ATP Challenger Tour, where he has won two singles titles.

== Career ==
=== 2023: ATP debut in doubles ===
In January, Onclin reached the semifinals of the 2023 BW Open in Ottignies-Louvain-la-Neuve where he lost to eventual champion and compatriot David Goffin.

In May, he defeated the higher-ranked Elias Ymer at a Challenger event in Bordeaux in the first round. At the 2023 French Open he defeated Nicholas David Ionel in straight sets in the first round of qualifying before losing to Argentine Thiago Agustin Tirante in three sets. Onclin got his revenge over the Argentine in the qualifying at the 2023 Wimbledon Championships, winning in straight sets during his first ever grass-court summer, as his junior years coincided with the grass-court portion of the Tour cancellation due to the COVID-19 pandemic.

In October, he received a wildcard in doubles for the European Open in Antwerp, alongside compatriot Michael Geerts. At the same tournament, in the qualifying singles competition, he defeated higher-ranked American Maxime Cressy.

=== 2024: Maiden Challenger final ===
In May, Onclin reached his first Challenger final at the Prague Open. He lost to the former world No. 35 Jiří Veselý. In October and November 2024 he reached two M25 finals in Portugal where he faced the same opponent, losing the first to Frederico Ferreira Silva but winning the second at the Vale do Lobo Open III. He closed out 2024 with a second title in two weeks, and 12th ITF title, winning the M25 in Monastir, Tunisia, recording 10 consecutive victories on the ITF circuit.

=== 2025: Grand Slam and top 200 debuts ===
Onclin started the season by increasing his 2024 winning streak to 13 matches after he made it through the qualifying rounds at the Australian Open into the main draw for his Grand Slam debut, defeating Roman Andres Burruchaga and Americans Aleksandar Kovacevic and Mackenzie McDonald. Despite winning the opening set, he lost to Reilly Opelka in the first round.

=== 2026: First Challenger titles, first ATP win ===
As top seed, Onclin won his first ATP Challenger title at the Ivory Coast Open, defeating Hamish Stewart in the final in two tiebreak sets. The following week, he claimed his second Challenger title by overcoming Michael Mmoh in the final of the Ivory Coast Open 2 in straight sets.

In June, ranked No. 186, Onclin earned his first ATP Tour win at the Stuttgart Open as a qualifier, by defeating Fábián Marozsán. He lost to Giovanni Mpetshi Perricard in the second round.

== Career statistics ==
=== Performance timeline ===
Key
W	F	SF	QF	#R	RR	Q#	DNQ	A	NH

(W) winner; (F) finalist; (SF) semifinalist; (QF) quarterfinalist; (#R) rounds 4, 3, 2, 1; (RR) round-robin stage; (Q#) qualification round; (DNQ) did not qualify; (A) absent; (NH) not held; (SR) strike rate (events won / competed); (W–L) win–loss record.
To avoid confusion and double counting, these charts are updated at the conclusion of a tournament or when the player's participation has ended.

==== Singles ====
Current through the 2026 Australian Open.

Tournament	2023	2024	2025	2026	SR	W–L	Win %
Grand Slam
Australian Open	A	Q1	1R	Q1	0 / 1	0–1	0%
French Open	Q2	A	Q1	A	0 / 0	0–0	–
Wimbledon	Q2	A	Q2		0 / 0	0–0	–
US Open	Q2	A	Q1		0 / 0	0–0	–
Win–loss	0–0	0–0	0–1	0–0	0 / 1	0–1	0%
ATP Masters 1000
Indian Wells Masters	A	A	A	A	0 / 0	0–0	–
Miami Open	A	A	A	A	0 / 0	0–0	–
Monte Carlo Masters	A	A	A	A	0 / 0	0–0	–
Madrid Open	A	A	A	A	0 / 0	0-0	–
Italian Open	A	A	A	A	0 / 0	0–0	–
Canadian Open	A	A	A		0 / 0	0–0	–
Cincinnati Masters	A	A	A		0 / 0	0–0	–
Shanghai Masters	A	A	Q1		0 / 0	0–0	–
Paris Masters	A	A	A		0 / 0	0–0	–
Win–loss	0–0	0–0	0–0	0–0	0 / 0	0–0	–

=== ATP Challenger Tour finals ===
Challenger

==== Singles: 3 (2 titles, 1 runner-up) ====
Finals by surface
Hard (2–0)
Clay (0–1)

Result	W–L	Date	Tournament	Surface	Opponent	Score
Loss	0–1	May 2024	Prague Open, Czech Republic	Clay	(Czech Republic) Jiří Veselý	2–6, 6–3, 6–7^{(3–7)}
Win	1–1	Apr 2026	Côte d'Ivoire Open, Ivory Coast	Hard	(United Kingdom) Hamish Stewart	7–6^{(7–5)}, 7–6^{(7–2)}
Win	2–1	May 2026	Côte d'Ivoire Open II, Ivory Coast (2)	Hard	(United States) Michael Mmoh	6–3, 6–4
