= Maximus Jones =

Thai tennis player

- Country (sports): Thailand
- Born: 5 September 2004 (age 22) Sydney, Australia
- Height: 1.85 m (6 ft 1 in)
- Plays: Right-handed (two-handed backhand)
- Prize money: $95,624

Singles
- Career record: 4–5
- Career titles: 1 Challenger, 2 ITF
- Highest ranking: No. 301 (9 February 2026)
- Current ranking: No. 301 (9 February 2026)

Doubles
- Career record: 1–0
- Career titles: 6 ITF
- Highest ranking: No. 383 (2 December 2024)
- Current ranking: No. 774 (9 February 2026)
Medal record
Men's tennis
Representing Thailand
Asian Games
| Bronze medal – third place | 2022 Hangzhou | Doubles |
Southeast Asian Games
| Gold medal – first place | 2025 Thailand | Singles |
| Gold medal – first place | 2025 Thailand | Doubles |
| Silver medal – second place | 2025 Thailand | Team |
- Last updated on: 9 February 2026.

Maximus Jones (born 5 September 2004) is an Australian-born Thai tennis player. Jones has a career high ATP singles ranking of world No. 301 achieved on 9 February 2026 and a career high doubles ranking of No. 383 achieved on 2 December 2024. Jones represents Thailand at the Davis Cup, where he has a win/loss record of 5–5.

== Early life ==
Jones was born in Sydney as the son of an Australian father and a Thai mother. He started playing tennis aged 7 for something to do after school. Jones' upbringing was strict with his parents not allowing him to own a mobile phone until he was 17. During the COVID-19 pandemic, Jones' mother moved them to Egypt so he could continue playing tennis as the only place in the world where International Tennis Federation events continued. Jones opted not to go to university, despite having scholarship offers from British and American universities, on the grounds that he believed he would only make tournament waiting lists if he did not continue playing competitively. After winning gold at the Southeast Asian Games, he moved to Majorca, Spain in order to attend Unity Tennis Academy.

== Professional career ==
=== 2025: Maiden Challenger title, top 500 ===
In April, Jones won his maiden title in Abidjan, as a qualifier, defeating Ričardas Berankis in the final. Jones became the youngest player from Thailand to win a Challenger title.

In December 2025 in the 33rd South East Asian Games Jones won a gold medal in the Mens Singles and a gold medal in the Mens Doubles for tennis. In doing so, he became the first Thai tennis player in ten years to win a gold medal in the men's singles at the Southeast Asian Games.

== ATP Challenger Tour finals ==
=== Singles: 2 (1 title, 1 runner-ups) ===
| Legend ATP Challenger Tour (1–1) |

| Result | W–L | Date | Tournament | Tier | Surface | Opponent | Score |
|---|---|---|---|---|---|---|---|
| Win | 1–0 | April 2025 | Abidjan, Ivory Coast | Challenger | Hard | (Lithuania) Ričardas Berankis | 6–3, 4–6, 6–4 |
| Loss | 1–1 | January 2026 | Nonthaburi, Thailand | Challenger | Hard | (Spain) Pol Martín Tiffon | 4–6, 6–3, 4–6 |
