= Billy Suarez =

American tennis player (born 2002)

- Country (sports): United States
- Born: February 13, 2002 (age 24) New York City, United States
- Height: 1.93 m (6 ft 4 in)
- Plays: Right-handed (two-handed backhand)
- College: Tulane
- Prize money: US $25,523

Singles
- Career record: 0–0 (at ATP Tour level, Grand Slam level and in Davis Cup)
- Career titles: 0
- Highest ranking: No. 1,029 (May 4, 2026)
- Current ranking: No. 1,427 (November 16, 2026)

Doubles
- Career record: 0–0 (at ATP Tour level, Grand Slam level and in Davis Cup)
- Career titles: 1 Challenger, 6 ITF
- Highest ranking: No. 242 (November 16, 2026)
- Current ranking: No. 242 (November 16, 2026)
- Last updated on: November 16, 2026.

Billy Suarez (born February 13, 2002) is an American tennis player. Suarez has a career high ATP singles ranking of No. 1,029 achieved on May 4, 2026 and a career high ATP doubles ranking of No. 242 achieved on November 16, 2026.

Suarez has won one ATP Challenger doubles title at the 2026 Côte d'Ivoire Open II.

Suarez played college tennis at Tulane.
