= Aziz Dougaz =

Tunisian tennis player (born 1997)

Aziz Dougaz محمد عزيز دوقاز
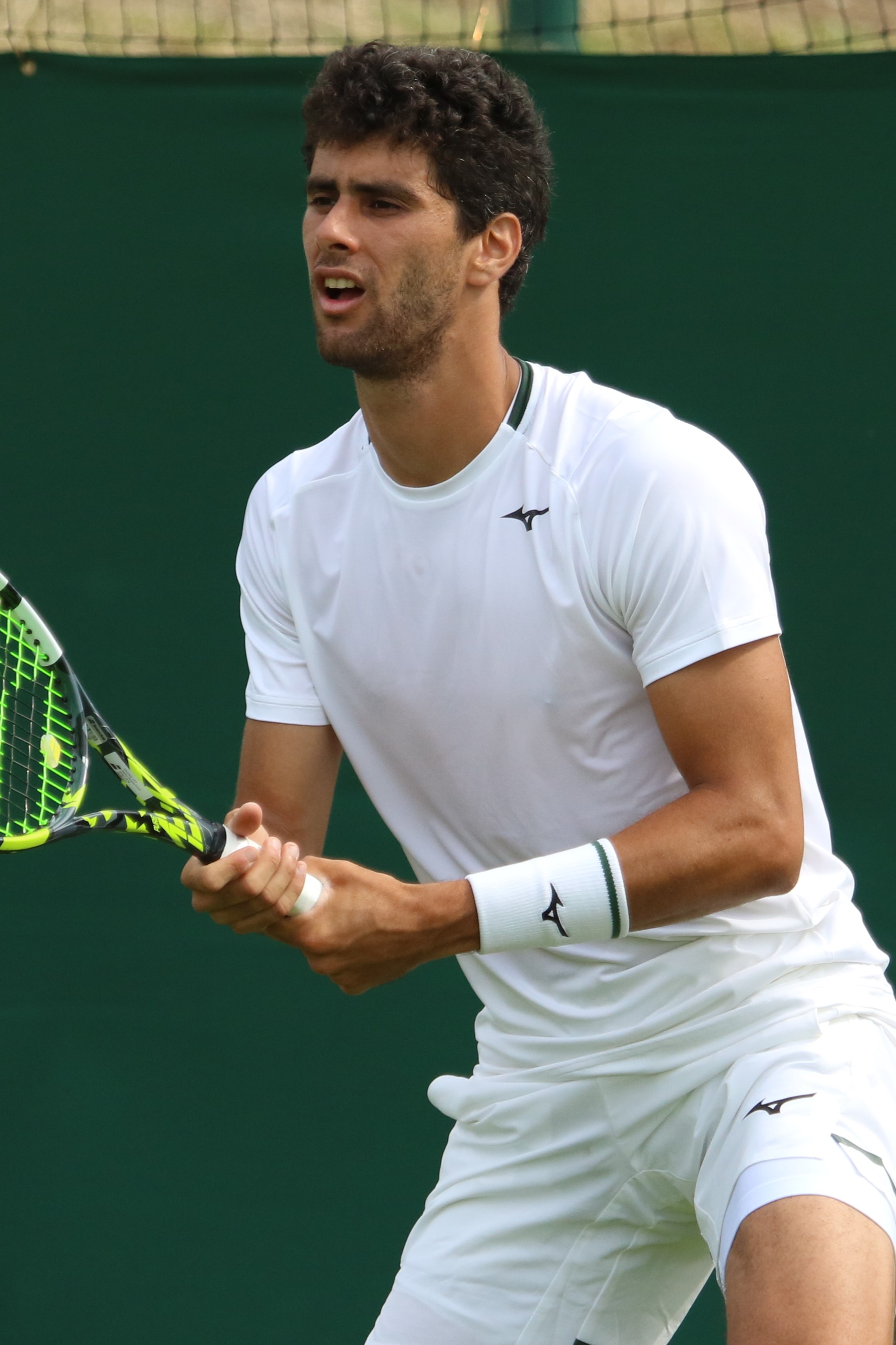
- Dougaz at the 2023 Wimbledon Championships
- Country (sports): Tunisia
- Residence: Tallahassee, United States
- Born: 26 March 1997 (age 29) La Marsa, Tunisia
- Height: 1.88 m (6 ft 2 in)
- Turned pro: 2020
- Plays: Left-handed (two handed-backhand)
- Prize money: US $858,937

Singles
- Career record: 6–15
- Career titles: 0
- Highest ranking: No. 185 (14 April 2025)
- Current ranking: No. 367 (16 november 2026)

Grand Slam singles results
- Australian Open: 1R (2025)
- French Open: Q2 (2024)
- Wimbledon: Q2 (2026)
- US Open: Q3 (2026)

Doubles
- Career record: 2–1
- Career titles: 0
- Highest ranking: No. 261 (2 December 2019)

Team competitions
- Davis Cup: 15–11
Medal record
Representing Tunisia
Men's Tennis
African Games
Gold medal – first place	2019 Rabat	Doubles
Mediterranean Games
Silver medal – second place	2018 Tarragona	Doubles
- Last updated on: 16 november 2026.

Aziz Dougaz (Arabic: محمد عزيز دوقاز; born 26 March 1997) is a Tunisian tennis player. He has a career-high ATP singles ranking of No. 185 achieved on 14 April 2025 and a career-high doubles ranking of world No. 261 achieved on 2 December 2019. He is currently the No. 2 Tunisian player.

On the junior tour, Dougaz had a career-high ranking of No. 46 achieved on 16 February 2015. Dougaz reached the quarterfinals of the 2015 Juniors Wimbledon in doubles.

Dougaz has represented Tunisia in the Davis Cup, where he has a win-loss record of 15–11.

== Career ==
He achieved a career high singles ranking of No. 214 on 12 June 2023 following lifting three ITF trophies in Monastir, Tunisia within a month, which made him only the second player from Africa in the top 250, and later the top 200 on 21 October 2024.

Ranked No. 230, Dougaz made his Grand Slam debut at the 2025 Australian Open after qualifying for the main draw, guaranteeing a six continent representation in both the men and women events at the tournament. He lost to Yoshihito Nishioka in the first round.

== Challenger and Futures finals ==
=== Singles: 33 (19–14) ===
Legend ATP Challenger Tour (0–2) ITF Futures/World Tennis Tour (19–12)	Finals by surface Hard (16–8) Clay (3–6)

Result	W–L	Date	Tournament	Tier	Surface	Opponent	Score
Loss	0–1	Jul 2016	F4 Nador, Morocco	Futures	Clay	(Morocco) Reda El Amrani	3–6, 3–6
Loss	0–2	Oct 2017	F29 Hammamet, Tunisia	Futures	Clay	(Italy) Filippo Baldi	7–5, 4–6, 3–6
Loss	0–3	Dec 2017	F40 Hammamet, Tunisia	Futures	Clay	(Serbia) Miljan Zekić	3–6, 2–6
Win	1–3	Jul 2018	F20 Champaign, United States	Futures	Hard	(Cyprus) Petros Chrysochos	7–6^{(7–3)}, 6–4
Win	2–3	Oct 2018	F37 Monastir, Tunisia	Futures	Hard	(France) Gabriel Petit	6–3, 6–4
Loss	2–4	Dec 2018	F44 Monastir, Tunisia	Futures	Hard	(France) Manuel Guinard	5–7, 4–6
Win	3–4	May 2019	M15 Tabarka, Tunisia	World Tennis Tour	Clay	(France) Jules Okala	6–4, 7–5
Win	4–4	Dec 2019	M15 Monastir, Tunisia	World Tennis Tour	Hard	(Czech Republic) Jan Šátral	6–3, 6–4
Win	5–4	Feb 2021	M15 Monastir, Tunisia	World Tennis Tour	Hard	(Belgium) Gauthier Onclin	6–1, 3–6, 6–3
Win	6–4	Apr 2021	M15 Monastir, Tunisia	World Tennis Tour	Hard	(Italy) Franco Agamenone	6–3, 6–4
Loss	6–5	May 2021	M15 Monastir, Tunisia	World Tennis Tour	Hard	(South Korea) Chung Yun-seong	1–6, 5–7
Loss	6–6	May 2022	M15 Oran, Algeria	World Tennis Tour	Clay	(Switzerland) Mirko Martinez	3–6, 6–4, 2–6
Win	7–6	Jun 2022	M15 Monastir, Tunisia	World Tennis Tour	Hard	(Tunisia) Skander Mansouri	6–4, 6–4
Win	8–6	Jun 2022	M15 Monastir, Tunisia	World Tennis Tour	Hard	(Tunisia) Skander Mansouri	7–6^{(7–5)}, 6–0
Win	9–6	Jun 2022	M15 Monastir, Tunisia	World Tennis Tour	Hard	(Tunisia) Skander Mansouri	7–6^{(7–4)}, 6–3
Win	10–6	Sep 2022	M15 Monastir, Tunisia	World Tennis Tour	Hard	(United States) Colin Markes	7–5, 6–3
Win	11–6	Oct 2022	M25 Saint-Augustin, Canada	World Tennis Tour	Hard	(Canada) Justin Boulais	7–5, 6–4
Win	12–6	Oct 2023	M15 Monastir, Tunisia	World Tennis Tour	Hard	(France) Constantin Bittoun Kouzmine	7–6^{(7–3)}, 6–3
Loss	12–7	Oct 2023	M25 Saint-Augustin, Canada	World Tennis Tour	Hard	(United Kingdom) Charles Broom	7–6^{(7–5)}, 4–6, 2–6
Loss	12–8	Nov 2023	M25 Monastir, Tunisia	World Tennis Tour	Hard	(Spain) Alberto Barroso Campos	6–7^{(3–7)}, 7–6^{(7–5)}, 3–6
Win	13–8	Apr 2024	M25 Hammamet, Tunisia	World Tennis Tour	Clay	(Austria) Sandro Kopp	7–6^{(8–6)}, 6–2
Loss	13–9	Apr 2024	M25 Hammamet, Tunisia	World Tennis Tour	Clay	(Belgium) Raphaël Collignon	6–4, 1–6, 1–6
Loss	13–10	Apr 2024	M25 Angers, France	World Tennis Tour	Clay	(Belgium) Raphaël Collignon	2–6, 4–6
Win	14–10	May 2024	M25 Kursumlijska Banja, Serbia	World Tennis Tour	Clay	(Serbia) Stefan Popovic	6–1, 6–1
Win	15–10	Sep 2024	M25 Guiyang, China	World Tennis Tour	Hard	(South Africa) Kris van Wyk	7–6^{(7–4)}, 6–1
Win	16–10	Sep 2024	M25 Fuzhou, China	World Tennis Tour	Hard	(China) Cui Jie	4–6, 6–3, 5–6 ret.
Loss	16–11	Mar 2025	M25 Santo Domingo, Dominican Republic	World Tennis Tour	Hard	(Czech Republic) Petr Brunclik	6–2, 6–7^{(8–10)}, 3–6
Loss	16–12	Apr 2025	Côte d'Ivoire Open II, Ivory Coast	Challenger	Hard	(Ivory Coast) Eliakim Coulibaly	7–6^{(7–3)}, 4–6, 4–6
Loss	16–13	Jun 2025	M25 Monastir, Tunisia	World Tennis Tour	Hard	(Tunisia) Moez Echargui	4–6, 3–6
Win	17–13	Jul 2025	M15 Monastir, Tunisia	World Tennis Tour	Hard	(France) Cyril Vandermeersch	2–6, 6–0, 6–4
Win	18–13	Jun 2026	M15 Monastir, Tunisia	World Tennis Tour	Hard	(France) Cesar Bouchelaghem	6–7^{(3–7)}, 6–0, 6–3
Win	19–13	Jul 2026	M15 Monastir, Tunisia	World Tennis Tour	Hard	(Turkey) Tuncay Duran	7–6^{(7–3)}, 6–2
Loss	19–14	Aug 2026	Astana, Kazakhstan	Challenger	Hard	(Japan) Hayato Matsuoka	6–0, 1–6, 6–7^{(5–7)}

=== Doubles 36 (22–14) ===
Legend ATP Challenger Tour (1–0) ITF Futures Tour (21–14)	Finals by surface Hard (15–9) Clay (7–5)

Result	W–L	Date	Tournament	Tier	Surface	Partner	Opponents	Score
Loss	0–1	May 2014	F2 Casablanca, Morocco	Futures	Clay	(Mali) Seydou Diallo	(Morocco) Yassine Idmbarek (Morocco) Younès Rachidi	1–6, 2–6
Win	1–1	Jun 2014	F3 Rabat, Morocco	Futures	Clay	(Burundi) Guy Orly Iradukunda	(France) Maxime Chazal (France) Tak Khunn Wang	3–6, 6–1, [10–6]
Loss	1–2	Sep 2015	F21 El Kantaoui, Tunisia	Futures	Hard	(United States) Jordan Dyke	(Tunisia) Anis Ghorbel (Bulgaria) Vasko Mladenov	2–6, 7–6^{(8–6)}, [6–10]
Loss	1–3	Oct 2015	F27 El Kantaoui, Tunisia	Futures	Hard	(Tunisia) Anis Ghorbel	(France) Benjamin Bonzi (France) Fabien Reboul	2–6, 2–6
Loss	1–4	Jul 2016	F14 Sharm El Sheikh, Egypt	Futures	Hard	(Spain) Javier Pulgar-Garcia	(United States) Jarmere Jenkins (United States) Anderson Reed	3–6, 2–6
Win	2–4	Jul 2016	F4 Nador, Morocco	Futures	Clay	(Tunisia) Skander Mansouri	(Spain) Alejandro García Sáez (Spain) Daniel Monedero-González	6–3, 6–4
Loss	2–5	Dec 2016	F40 Tallahassee, United States	Futures	Hard (i)	(Burundi) Guy Orly Iradukunda	(United States) Robert Galloway (United States) Nathaniel Lammons	4–6, 7–5, [8–10]
Win	3–5	Jun 2017	F22 Hammamet, Tunisia	Futures	Clay	(Tunisia) Skander Mansouri	(Tunisia) Moez Echargui (Portugal) Gonçalo Oliveira	7–6^{(7–4)}, 6–1
Win	4–5	Jun 2017	F24 Hammamet, Tunisia	Futures	Clay	(Tunisia) Skander Mansouri	(France) Théo Fournerie (France) Louis Tessa	6–2, 6–4
Loss	4–6	Sep 2017	F25 Hammamet, Tunisia	Futures	Clay	(Tunisia) Anis Ghorbel	(France) Elliot Benchetrit (Germany) Rudolf Molleker	5–7, 3–6
Win	5–6	Jun 2018	F22 Hammamet, Tunisia	Futures	Clay	(Tunisia) Anis Ghorbel	(Argentina) Santiago Besada (Argentina) Juan Ignacio Galarza	7–5, 7–5
Loss	5–7	Jun 2018	F23 Hammamet, Tunisia	Futures	Clay	(Tunisia) Anis Ghorbel	(Spain) Sergio Barranco (Spain) Oriol Roca Batalla	6–4, 1–6, [8–10]
Win	6–7	Dec 2018	F1 Yaoundé, Cameroon	Futures	Hard	(Tunisia) Skander Mansouri	(France) Sadio Doumbia (Brazil) Diego Matos	6–4, 6–7^{(5–7)}, [10–8]
Win	7–7	Dec 2018	F2 Yaoundé, Cameroon	Futures	Hard	(Tunisia) Skander Mansouri	(France) Sadio Doumbia (Brazil) Diego Matos	6–4, 6–2
Win	8–7	Dec 2018	F44 Monastir, Tunisia	Futures	Hard	(Portugal) Fred Gil	(Austria) Alexander Erler (Germany) Christian Hirschmüller	6–1, 6–3
Win	9–7	Dec 2018	F45 Monastir, Tunisia	Futures	Hard	(Portugal) Fred Gil	(Italy) Erik Crepaldi (France) Hugo Voljacques	5–7, 6–4, [13–11]
Win	10–7	Jan 2019	M25 Tucson, United States	World Tennis Tour	Hard	(France) Manuel Guinard	(United Kingdom) Lloyd Glasspool (United Kingdom) Evan Hoyt	6–4, 5–7, [10–3]
Loss	10–8	May 2019	M15 Tabarka, Tunisia	World Tennis Tour	Clay	(Tunisia) Anis Ghorbel	(France) Manuel Guinard (Argentina) Mariano Kestelboim	4–6, 1–6
Loss	10–9	Jun 2019	M25 Pardubice, Czech Republic	World Tennis Tour	Clay	(France) Manuel Guinard	(Czech Republic) Vít Kopřiva (Czech Republic) Jaroslav Pospíšil	4–6, 2–6
Win	11–9	Sep 2019	M25 La Marsa, Tunisia	World Tennis Tour	Clay	(Tunisia) Skander Mansouri	(Tunisia) Moez Echargui (France) Thomas Setodji	6–2, 4–6, [10–8]
Win	12–9	Oct 2019	M25+H Lagos, Nigeria	World Tennis Tour	Hard	(Tunisia) Skander Mansouri	(Zimbabwe) Benjamin Lock (Zimbabwe) Courtney John Lock	7–6^{(7–4)}, 6–3
Win	13–9	Nov 2019	M25 Monastir, Tunisia	World Tennis Tour	Hard	(Burundi) Guy Orly Iradukunda	(Russia) Savriyan Danilov (Tunisia) Majed Kilani	6–2, 6–1
Loss	13–10	Nov 2019	M15 Monastir, Tunisia	World Tennis Tour	Hard	(Zimbabwe) Benjamin Lock	(Belgium) Zizou Bergs (Italy) Francesco Vilardo	3–6, 4–6
Win	14–10	Nov 2019	M15 Monastir, Tunisia	World Tennis Tour	Hard	(Zimbabwe) Benjamin Lock	(Czech Republic) Ondřej Krstev (Czech Republic) Jan Šátral	6–7^{(6–8)}, 6–2, [10–8]
Loss	14–11	Jan 2020	M15 Monastir, Tunisia	World Tennis Tour	Hard	(Tunisia) Moez Echargui	(Russia) Artem Dubrivnyy (Kazakhstan) Timur Khabibulin	5–7, 3–6
Win	15–11	Feb 2020	M15 Monastir, Tunisia	World Tennis Tour	Hard	(Romania) Adrian Barbu	(Belgium) Arnaud Bovy (Belgium) Gauthier Onclin	6–4, 6–4
Win	16–11	Feb 2020	M15 Monastir, Tunisia	World Tennis Tour	Hard	(Tunisia) Majed Kilani	(Spain) Alberto Barroso Campos (Spain) Benjamín Winter López	6–7^{(5–7)}, 6–4, [11–9]
Win	17–11	Oct 2020	M15 Monastir, Tunisia	World Tennis Tour	Hard	(Tunisia) Skander Mansouri	(Germany) Mats Rosenkranz (Germany) Tom Schönenberg	4–6, 7–6^{(7–1)}, [10–5]
Win	18–11	Oct 2020	M15 Monastir, Tunisia	World Tennis Tour	Hard	(Tunisia) Skander Mansouri	(Switzerland) Mirko Martinez (Estonia) Kristjan Tamm	6–3, 7–5
Win	19–11	Apr 2021	M15 Monastir, Tunisia	World Tennis Tour	Hard	(Zimbabwe) Benjamin Lock	(Italy) Franco Agamenone (Poland) Piotr Matuszewski	7–6^{(7–2)}, 3–6, [11–9]
Loss	19–12	May 2021	M15 Monastir, Tunisia	World Tennis Tour	Hard	(Zimbabwe) Benjamin Lock	(South Korea) Chung Yun-seong (Japan) Shintaro Imai	3–6, 2–6
Loss	19–13	May 2021	M15 Monastir, Tunisia	World Tennis Tour	Hard	(Burundi) Guy Orly Iradukunda	(Australia) Jeremy Beale (Australia) Thomas Fancutt	4–6, 6–3, [6–10]
Loss	19–14	Mar 2022	M15 Monastir, Tunisia	World Tennis Tour	Hard	(Luxembourg) Alex Knaff	(China) Li Hanwen (Argentina) Mateo Nicolás Martínez	1–6, 6–2, [8–10]
Win	20–14	Mar 2022	M15 Monastir, Tunisia	World Tennis Tour	Hard	(Luxembourg) Alex Knaff	(Japan) Tomohiro Masabayashi (Japan) Ren Nakamura	6–2, 6–4
Win	21–14	May 2022	M15 Monastir, Tunisia	World Tennis Tour	Hard	(Australia) Akira Santillan	(France) Théo Arribagé (France) Luca Sanchez	7–6^{(7–1)}, 7–6^{(7–3)}
Win	22-14	Apr 2023	León Open, Mexico	Challenger	Hard	(France) Antoine Escoffier	(Austria) Maximilian Neuchrist (Greece) Michail Pervolarakis	7–6^{(7–5)}, 3–6, [10–5]

== Davis Cup ==
=== Participations: (12–7) ===
Group membership World Group (0–0) WG play-off (0–0) Group I (0–0) Group II (5–7) Group III (7–0) Group IV (0–0)	Matches by surface Hard (4–7) Clay (8–0) Grass (0–0) Carpet (0–0)	Matches by type Singles (7–7) Doubles (5–0)

- ▲ ▼ indicates the outcome of the Davis Cup match followed by the score, date, place of event, the zonal classification and its phase, and the court surface.

Rubber outcome	No.	Rubber	Match type (partner if any)	Opponent nation	Opponent player(s)	Score
▲3–0; 26 October 2015; Smash Tennis Academy, Cairo, Egypt; Africa Zone Group III Round Robin; clay surface
Victory	1	III	Doubles (with Skander Mansouri) (dead rubber)	Algeria	Mohamed Hassan / Aymen Ikhlef	6–1, 6–2
▲3–0; 27 October 2015; Smash Tennis Academy, Cairo, Egypt; Africa Zone Group III Round Robin; clay surface
Victory	2	I	Singles	Namibia	Gideon Van Dyk	6–1, 6–0
▲3–0; 28 October 2015; Smash Tennis Academy, Cairo, Egypt; Africa Zone Group III Round Robin; clay surface
Victory	3	II	Singles	Ghana	Pascal Alome	6–1, 6–2
Victory	4	III	Doubles (with Majed Kilani) (dead rubber)	Ghana	George Darko / Wisdom Na-Adjrago	7–5, 7–6^{(7–1)}
▲3–2; 15-17 July 2016; Tennis Courts of Cité Nationale Sportive, Tunis, Tunisia; Europe/Africa Zone Group II relegation play-off; hard surface
Victory	5	I	Singles	Bulgaria	Alexandar Lazov	7–6^{(7–4)}, 6–4, 2–6, 7–5
Defeat	6	V	Singles (dead rubber)	Bulgaria	Alexandar Lazarov	6–4, 4–6, 6–7^{(1–7)}
▼2–3; 3-5 February 2017; Tennis Courts of Cité Nationale Sportive, Tunis, Tunisia; Europe/Africa Zone Group II first round; hard surface
Defeat	7	II	Singles	Sweden	Patrik Rosenholm	6–7^{(4–7)}, 3–6, 6–3, 6–4, 3–6
Defeat	8	V	Singles	Sweden	Isak Arvidsson	7–6^{(9–7)}, 2–6, 1–6, 6–3, 3–6
▲4–1; 7-9 April 2017; National Tennis Centre, Nicosia, Cyprus; Europe/Africa Zone Group II relegation play-off; hard surface
Defeat	9	IV	Singles (dead rubber)	Cyprus	Petros Chrysochos	4–6, 6–7^{(2–7)}
▼2–3; 3-4 February 2018; Tennis Courts Cite Nationale Sportive El Menzah, Tunis, Tunisia; Europe/Africa Zone Group II first round; hard surface
Defeat	10	II	Singles	Finland	Emil Ruusuvuori	4–6, 1–6
▲3–0; 11 September 2019; Nairobi Club, Nairobi, Kenya; Africa Zone Group III Pool A round robin; clay surface
Victory	11	III	Doubles (with Malek Jaziri) (dead rubber)	Mozambique	Jaime Sigauque / Ataide Suca	6–1, 6–1
▲3–0; 12 September 2019; Nairobi Club, Nairobi, Kenya; Africa Zone Group III Pool A round robin; clay surface
Victory	12	III	Doubles (with Malek Jaziri) (dead rubber)	Nigeria	Emmanuel Audu / Emmanuel Idoko	6–2, 7–6^{(7–2)}
▲3–0; 13 September 2019; Nairobi Club, Nairobi, Kenya; Africa Zone Group III Pool A round robin; clay surface
Victory	13	II	Singles	Namibia	Jean Erasmus	6–3, 7–6^{(7–5)}
▲3–1; 6-7 March 2020; Federación Nacional de Tenis, Guatemala City, Guatemala; World Group II Play-off first round; hard surface
Defeat	14	I	Singles	Guatemala	Wilfredo González	3–6, 6–3, 5–7
▲3–2; 17-18 September 2021; Cité Nationale Sportive El Menzah, Tunis, Tunisia; World Group II first round; hard surface
Victory	15	II	Singles	Dominican Republic	Roberto Cid Subervi	6–2, 6–4
Victory	16	III	Doubles (with Aziz Ouakaa)	Dominican Republic	Roberto Cid Subervi / Nick Hardt	6–4, 7–6^{(7–3)}
Victory	17	V	Singles	Dominican Republic	Nick Hardt	6–3, 6–4
▲4–0; 26-27 November 2021; Tennis Club de Tunis, Tunis, Tunisia; World Group II Knockout round; clay surface
Victory	18	II	Singles	Zimbabwe	Benjamin Lock	2–6, 7–6^{(8–6)}, 7–5
▼1–3; 16-17 September 2022; Courts de Tennis, Tunis, Tunisia; World Group II first round; hard surface
Defeat	19	I	Singles	Greece	Stefanos Tsitsipas	6–7^{(3–7)}, 2–6

== Another finals ==
=== Mediterranean Games ===
==== Doubles: 1 Runner-up ====
Outcome	No.	Date	Tournament	Surface	Partner	Opponent	Score
Runner-up	1.	29 June 2018	Tarragona, Spain	Clay	(Tunisia) Anis Ghorbel	(France) Corentin Denolly (France) Alexandre Müller	6–4, 6–7, [10–12]

=== African Games ===
==== Doubles: 1 Win ====
Outcome	No.	Date	Tournament	Surface	Partner	Opponent	Score
Win	1.	29 August 2019	Rabat, Morocco	Clay	(Tunisia) Skander Mansouri	(Morocco) Adam Moundir (Morocco) Lamine Ouahab	6–4, 7–5
