= Adil Kalyanpur =

Indian tennis player (born 2000)

- Country (sports): India
- Born: 26 January 2000 (age 26) Bengaluru, India
- Height: 1.88 m (6 ft 2 in)
- Plays: Right-handed (two-handed backhand)
- Coach: Vishal Uppal
- Prize money: US $70,639

Singles
- Career record: 0–0 (at ATP Tour level, Grand Slam level and in Davis Cup)
- Career titles: 0
- Highest ranking: No. 842 (14 October 2024)
- Current ranking: No. 1,455 (9 November 2026)

Doubles
- Career record: 0–0 (at ATP Tour level, Grand Slam level and in Davis Cup)
- Career titles: 1 Challenger, 5 ITF
- Highest ranking: No. 258 (23 June 2025)
- Current ranking: No. 335 (9 November 2026)
- Last updated on: 9 November 2026.

Adil Kalyanpur (born 26 January 2000) is an Indian tennis player. Kalyanpur has a career high ATP singles ranking of No. 842 achieved on 14 October 2024 and a career high ATP doubles ranking of No. 258 achieved on 23 June 2025.

Kalyanpur has won one ATP Challenger doubles title at the 2026 Bengaluru Open III.
