= Eliakim Coulibaly =

Ivorian tennis player (born 2002)

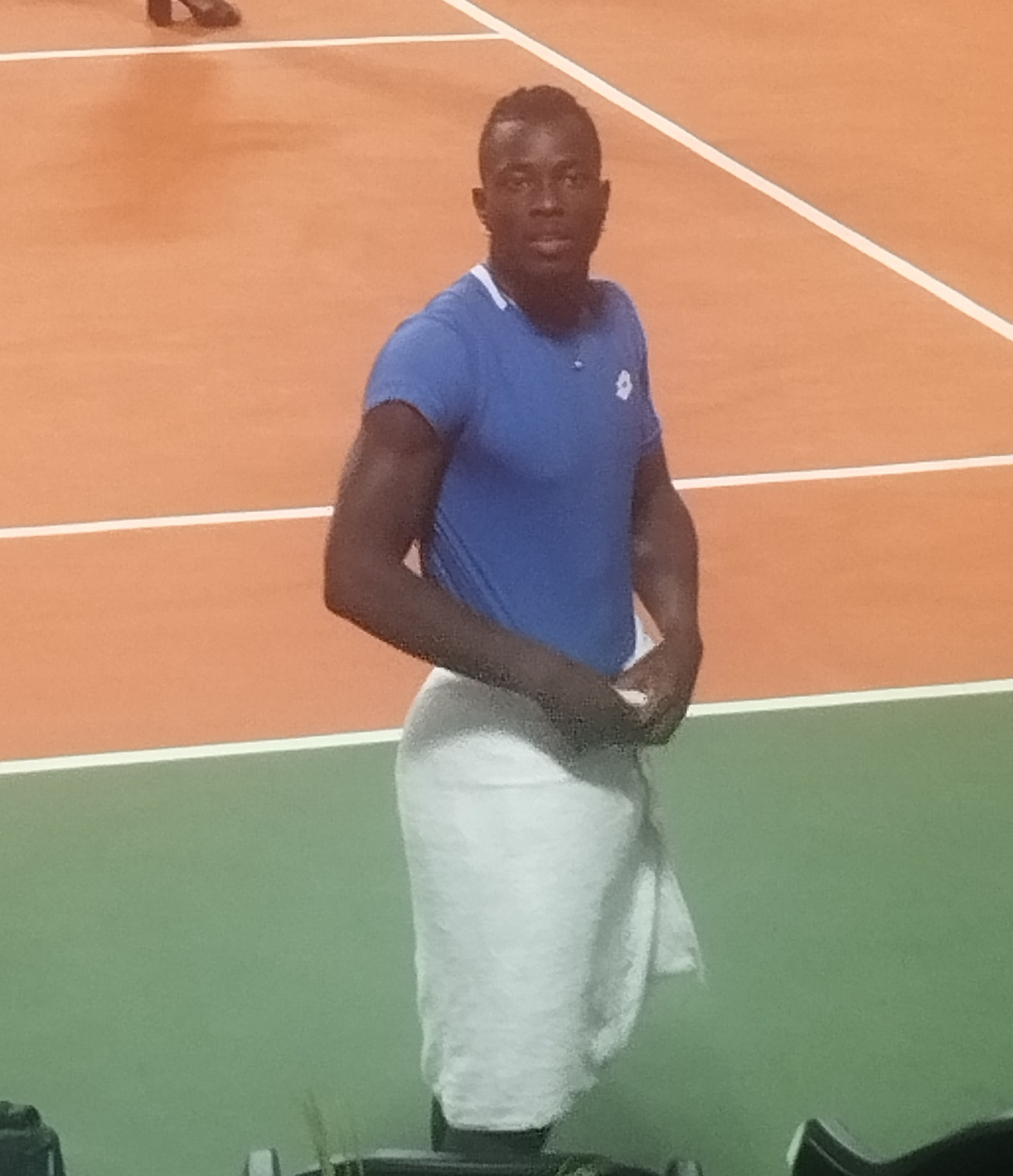
- Eliakim Coulibaly at the 2026 Côte d'Ivoire Open
- Country (sports): Ivory Coast
- Born: 5 May 2002 (age 24) Abidjan, Ivory Coast
- Height: 1.83 m (6 ft 0 in)
- Plays: Left-handed (two-handed backhand)
- Prize money: US $169,641

Singles
- Career record: 0–1 (at ATP Tour level, Grand Slam level, and in Davis Cup)
- Career titles: 0; 1 Challenger
- Highest ranking: No. 263 (14 July 2025)
- Current ranking: No. 342 (9 November 2026)

Doubles
- Career record: 0–1 (at ATP Tour level, Grand Slam level, and in Davis Cup)
- Career titles: 0
- Highest ranking: No. 442 (22 June 2026)
- Current ranking: No. 550 (9 November 2026)
- Last updated on: 9 November 2026.

Eliakim Coulibaly (born 5 May 2002) is an Ivorian professional tennis player. He has a career-high ATP singles ranking of No. 263 achieved on 14 July 2025 and a doubles ranking of No. 442 achieved on 22 June 2026. Coulibaly is the first Ivorian to win an ATP Challenger singles title, at the second edition of his home tournament Côte d'Ivoire Open.

On junior circuit, he had an ITF combined ranking of No. 16, achieved on 6 January 2020.

Coulibaly represents Ivory Coast at the Davis Cup, where he has a W/L record of 2–0.

== Career ==
Coulibaly began his tennis career training in Abidjan before moving to Casablanca at the age of 12. He was renowned as a top prospect for African tennis, as he and South African Khololwam Montsi became the first African duo to reach the top 20 in the ITF juniors rankings.

== Personal life ==
Coulibaly currently lives in the south of France and trains at the Mouratoglou Tennis Academy.

== ATP Challenger Tour finals ==
=== Singles: 1 (title) ===
Legend ATP Challenger Tour (1–0)

Result	W–L	Date	Tournament	Tier	Surface	Opponent	Score
Win	1–0	Apr 2025	Côte d'Ivoire Open II, Ivory Coast	Challenger	Hard	(Tunisia) Aziz Dougaz	6–7^{(3–7)}, 6–4, 6–4

== ITF World Tennis Tour finals ==
=== Singles: 18 (13 titles, 5 runner-ups) ===
Legend ITF WTT (13–5)	Finals by surface Hard (13–5) Clay (0–0)

Result	W–L	Date	Tournament	Tier	Surface	Opponent	Score
Loss	0–1	Apr 2021	M15 Monastir, Tunisia	WTT	Hard	(Italy) Franco Agamenone	2–6, 3–6
Win	1–1	May 2021	M15 Monastir, Tunisia	WTT	Hard	(Australia) Thomas Fancutt	2–6, 6–2, 7–6^{(7–1)}
Win	2–1	Jul 2021	M15 Monastir, Tunisia	WTT	Hard	(Italy) Luca Potenza	5–7, 6–2, 6–4
Win	3–1	Aug 2022	M15 Monastir, Tunisia	WTT	Hard	(Australia) Matthew Dellavedova	7–5, 6–4
Win	4–1	Sep 2022	M15 Monastir, Tunisia	WTT	Hard	(France) Constantin Bittoun Kouzmine	6–2, 6–4
Loss	4–2	Sep 2022	M15 Monastir, Tunisia	WTT	Hard	(Tunisia) Skander Mansouri	3–6, 4–6
Win	5–2	Sep 2022	M15 Monastir, Tunisia	WTT	Hard	(Australia) Matthew Dellavedova	6–2, 6–3
Win	6–2	May 2023	M15 Monastir, Tunisia	WTT	Hard	(China) Te Rigele	6–2, 6–1
Loss	6–3	Apr 2024	M15 Monastir, Tunisia	WTT	Hard	(France) Robin Bertrand	6–7 ^{(3–7)}, 3–6
Win	7–3	Jul 2024	M15 Monastir, Tunisia	WTT	Hard	(Tunisia) Aziz Ouakaa	6–0, 2–0 ret.
Win	8–3	Jul 2024	M15 Monastir, Tunisia	WTT	Hard	(United States) Darwin Blanch	6–2, 6–2
Loss	8–4	Aug 2024	M15 Monastir, Tunisia	WTT	Hard	(United Kingdom) Oliver Tarvet	7–6^{(7–4)}, 4–6, 1–6
Win	9–4	Aug 2024	M15 Monastir, Tunisia	WTT	Hard	(Colombia) Adrià Soriano Barrera	6–4, 6–3
Win	10–4	Nov 2024	M25 Maputo, Mozambique	WTT	Hard	(Czech Republic) Dominik Palán	5–7, 6–3, 6–4
Loss	10–5	Jun 2025	M25 Monastir, Tunisia	WTT	Hard	(France) Robin Bertrand	6–3, 3–6, 6–7^{(4–7)}
Win	11–5	Feb 2026	M25 Monastir, Tunisia	WTT	Hard	(France) Thomas Faurel	6–3, 6–3
Win	12–5	Oct 2026	M15 Monastir, Tunisia	WTT	Hard	(Spain) John Echeverria	4–6, 7–6^{(7–5)}, 6–1
Win	13–5	Oct 2026	M25 Luanda, Angola	WTT	Hard	(Belgium) Jack Logé	6–2, 6–2

=== Doubles: 5 (3 titles, 2 runner-ups) ===
Legend ITF WTT (3–2)	Finals by surface Hard (2–2) Clay (1–0)

Result	W–L	Date	Tournament	Tier	Surface	Partner	Opponents	Score
Loss	0–1	Mar 2022	M15 Monastir, Tunisia	WTT	Hard	(Turkey) Yankı Erel	(Netherlands) Jarno Jans (France) Robin Bertrand	4–6, 6–1, [6–10]
Win	1–1	Jul 2022	M25 Uriage, France	WTT	Clay	(France) Giovanni Mpetshi Perricard	(Switzerland) Adrien Burdet (France) Alexandre Reco	6–3, 7–5
Loss	1–2	Apr 2023	M15 Monastir, Tunisia	WTT	Hard	(Ghana) Abraham Asaba	(France) Maxence Beaugé (France) Arthur Bouquier	2–6, 6–7^{(5–7)}
Win	2–2	Jan 2024	M15 Bressuire, France	WTT	Hard (i)	(Finland) Eero Vasa	(Slovakia) Lukáš Pokorný (Slovakia) Igor Zelenay	4–6, 7–6^{(8–6)}, [10–8]
Win	3–2	Jun 2025	M25 Monastir, Tunisia	WTT	Hard	(Ghana) Isaac Nortey	(Turkey) Mert Alkaya (Turkey) Tuncay Duran	4–6, 6–4, [10–6]
