= Constantin Bittoun Kouzmine =

French tennis player

- Country (sports): France
- Born: 4 January 1999 (age 27) Paris, France
- Height: 1.78 m (5 ft 10 in)
- Turned pro: 2018
- Plays: Left-handed (two-handed backhand)
- Prize money: US $157,830

Singles
- Career record: 0–0 (at ATP Tour level, Grand Slam level, and in Davis Cup)
- Career titles: 2 ITF
- Highest ranking: No. 424 (3 August 2026)
- Current ranking: No. 490 (19 October 2026)

Doubles
- Career record: 0–0 (at ATP Tour level, Grand Slam level, and in Davis Cup)
- Career titles: 4 Challenger, 12 ITF
- Highest ranking: No. 173 (19 October 2026)
- Current ranking: No. 173 (19 October 2026)
- Last updated on: 19 October 2026.

Constantin Bittoun Kouzmine (born 4 January 1999) is a French tennis player. Bittoun Kouzmine has a career high ATP singles ranking of No. 424 achieved on 3 August 2026 and a career high ATP doubles ranking of No. 173 achieved on 19 October 2026.

== Career ==
=== 2023: First Challenger Final ===
In August, Bittoun Kouzmine reached his first Challenger doubles final at the 2023 Schwaben Open, partnering with Volodoymyr Uzhylovskyi. The pair lost to Constantin Frantzen and Hendrik Jebens in the final.

=== 2025: Maiden Challenger Doubles Title ===
In April, Bittoun Kouzmine won his maiden Challenger doubles title at the 2025 Côte d'Ivoire Open II, partnering with Aziz Ouakaa. The pair defeated Aleksandre Bakshi and S D Prajwal Dev in the final.

=== 2026: First Challenger Single final ===
In July, Bittoun Kouzmine reached his first Challenger single final at the Samsun Open. He lost to compatriot Gabriel Debru in the final.

== ATP Challengers Finals ==
=== Singles: 1 (1 runner-up) ===
Legend ATP Challenger (0–1)	Finals by surface Hard (0–1) Clay (0–0)

Result	W–L	Date	Tournament	Tier	Surface	Opponent	Score
Loss	0–1	Jul 2026	Samsun Open, Turkey	Challenger	Hard	(France) Gabriel Debru	6–3, 5–7, 4–6

=== Doubles: 8 (4 titles, 4 runner-ups) ===
Legend ATP Challenger (4–4)	Finals by surface Hard (4–3) Clay (0–1)

Result	W–L	Date	Tournament	Tier	Surface	Partner	Opponents	Score
Loss	0–1	Aug 2023	Augsburg, Germany	Challenger	Clay	(Ukraine) Volodoymyr Uzhylovskyi	(Germany) Constantin Frantzen (Germany) Hendrik Jebens	2–6, 2–6
Loss	0–2	Feb 2024	Bengaluru, India	Challenger	Hard	(France) Maxime Janvier	(India) Saketh Myneni (India) Ramkumar Ramanathan	3–6, 4–6
Win	1–2	Apr 2025	Abidjan, Ivory Coast	Challenger	Hard	(Tunisia) Aziz Ouakaa	(Georgia (country)) Aleksandre Bakshi (India) S D Prajwal Dev	7–6^{(7–5)}, 7–5
Loss	1–3	Apr 2026	Abidjan, Ivory Coast	Challenger	Hard	(Latvia) Robert Strombachs	(Denmark) Oskar Brostrøm Poulsen (United States) Billy Suarez	6–7^{(0–7)}, 0–6
Win	2–3	May 2026	Centurion, South Africa	Challenger	Hard	(Latvia) Robert Strombachs	(Turkey) Mert Alkaya (Turkey) Arda Azkara	6–4, 6–4
Win	3–3	Sep 2026	Phan Thiết III, Vietnam	Challenger	Hard	(India) S D Prajwal Dev	(Japan) Yamato Sueoka (Japan) Naoki Tajima	6–1, 7–6^{(7–0)}
Win	4–3	Sep 2026	Phan Thiết IV, Vietnam	Challenger	Hard	(India) S D Prajwal Dev	(Australia) Joshua Charlton (Japan) Yuta Shimizu	6–4, 7–6^{(7–1)}
Loss	4–4	Sep 2026	Saint-Tropez, France	Challenger	Hard	(Germany) Daniel Masur	(Switzerland) Jakub Paul (Czech Republic) Matej Vocel	4–6, 3–6
