= Oskar Brostrøm Poulsen =

Danish tennis player (born 2002)

- Country (sports): Denmark
- Born: 15 January 2002 (age 24) Helsingør, Denmark
- Height: 1.93 m (6 ft 4 in)
- Plays: Right-handed (two-handed backhand)
- College: Middle Tennessee; Baylor
- Prize money: US $32,566

Singles
- Career record: 0–0 (at ATP Tour level, Grand Slam level, and in Davis Cup)
- Career titles: 1 ITF
- Highest ranking: No. 719 (2 November 2026)
- Current ranking: No. 719 (2 November 2026)

Doubles
- Career record: 0–0 (at ATP Tour level, Grand Slam level, and in Davis Cup)
- Career titles: 1 Challenger, 11 ITF
- Highest ranking: No. 186 (14 September 2026)
- Current ranking: No. 189 (2 November 2026)
- Last updated on: 2 November 2026.

Oskar Brostrøm Poulsen (born 15 January 2002) is a Danish tennis player. Poulsen has a career high ATP singles ranking of No. 719 achieved on 2 November 2026 and a career high ATP doubles ranking of No. 186 achieved on 14 September 2026.

Poulsen has won one ATP Challenger doubles title at the 2026 Côte d'Ivoire Open II.

Poulsen played college tennis at Middle Tennessee before transferring to Baylor.
