= Niels Visker =

Dutch tennis player (born 2001)

- Country (sports): Netherlands
- Born: 5 October 2001 (age 25) Groningen, Netherlands
- Height: 1.91 m (6 ft 3 in)
- Plays: Right-handed (one-handed backhand)
- Coach: Alwin Visker, Tjerk Bogtstra
- Prize money: US $118,583

Singles
- Career record: 0–0 (at ATP Tour level, Grand Slam level and in Davis Cup)
- Career titles: 0
- Highest ranking: No. 414 (21 September 2026)
- Current ranking: No. 418 (16 November 2026)

Doubles
- Career record: 0–0 (at ATP Tour level, Grand Slam level and in Davis Cup)
- Career titles: 2 Challenger, 15 ITF
- Highest ranking: No. 145 (16 November 2026)
- Current ranking: No. 145 (16 November 2026)
- Last updated on: 16 November 2026.

Niels Visker (born 5 October 2001) is a Dutch tennis player. Visker has a career-high ATP singles ranking of world No. 414 achieved on 21 September 2026 and a doubles ranking of No. 145 achieved on 16 November 2026.

== Career ==
Visker won the ATP Challenger doubles title at the 2026 Trofeo Città di Cesenatico and 2026 Dublin Challenger.
