= 2025 Athens Challenger – Doubles =

Doubles
- 2025 Athens Challenger

Final
- Champions: (Spain) Alberto Barroso Campos (Belgium) Michael Geerts
- Runners-up: (Switzerland) Andrin Casanova (Switzerland) Nicolás Parizzia
- Score: 6–3, 3–6, [10–6]

Events
Singles	Doubles
- Athens Challenger

This was the first edition of the tournament.

Alberto Barroso Campos and Michael Geerts won the title after defeating Andrin Casanova and Nicolás Parizzia 6–3, 3–6, [10–6] in the final.

== Seeds ==
1. (United Kingdom) Scott Duncan / (United Kingdom) Mark Whitehouse (quarterfinals)
2. (Spain) Alberto Barroso Campos / (Belgium) Michael Geerts (champions)
3. (United Kingdom) Tom Hands / (United Kingdom) Harry Wendelken (semifinals)
4. (Sweden) Erik Grevelius / (Sweden) Adam Heinonen (semifinals)

== Draw ==
Key

- Q = Qualifier
- WC = Wild card
- LL = Lucky loser
- Alt = Alternate
- ITF = ITF entry
- PR = Protected ranking
- SR = Special ranking
- SE = Special exempt
- JE = Junior exempt
- JR = Junior Accelerator Programme entrant
- CO = College Accelerator Programme entrant
- NG = Next Gen Accelerator Program entrant
- w/o = Walkover
- r = Retired
- d = Defaulted

First round
(Switzerland) Andrin Casanova (Switzerland) Nicolás Parizzia	6	6
WC	(Greece) Filippos Astreinidis (Greece) Pa Tsitsipas	1	3
3	(United Kingdom) T Hands (United Kingdom) H Wendelken	6	6
(Cyprus) M Efstathiou (Cyprus) E Neos	2	2
(South Africa) P Henning (Zimbabwe) CJ Lock	7	7
(Czech Republic) J Jermář (Czech Republic) J Kumstát	5	5
WC	(Ukraine) Aleksandr Braynin (Greece) M Kalovelonis	1	4
(Italy) Luca Potenza (Italy) Augusto Virgili	6	6
(United Kingdom) G Hussey (United Kingdom) James Story	6^{3}	3
4	(Sweden) E Grevelius (Sweden) A Heinonen	7^{7}	6
(Spain) Sergio Callejón Hernando; Nikolay Vylegzhanin	3	0
(Chinese Taipei) J Hsu (Greece) D Sakellaridis	6	6
(Greece) Dimitris Azoidis (Germany) Henri Haupt	3	0
2	(Spain) A Barroso Campos (Belgium) M Geerts	6	6

Quarterfinals
1	(United Kingdom) S Duncan (United Kingdom) M Whitehouse	6^{1}	6^{4}
(Switzerland) A Casanova (Switzerland) N Parizzia	7^{7}	7^{7}
3	(United Kingdom) T Hands (United Kingdom) H Wendelken	6	6
(South Africa) P Henning (Zimbabwe) CJ Lock	4	3
(Italy) L Potenza (Italy) A Virgili	4	6	[0]^{r}
4	(Sweden) E Grevelius (Sweden) A Heinonen	6	4	[0]
(Chinese Taipei) J Hsu (Greece) D Sakellaridis	2	3
2	(Spain) A Barroso Campos (Belgium) M Geerts	6	6

Semifinals
(Switzerland) A Casanova (Switzerland) N Parizzia	6	6
3	(United Kingdom) T Hands (United Kingdom) H Wendelken	1	3
4	(Sweden) E Grevelius (Sweden) A Heinonen	4	4
2	(Spain) A Barroso Campos (Belgium) M Geerts	6	6

Final
(Switzerland) A Casanova (Switzerland) N Parizzia	3	6	[6]
2	(Spain) A Barroso Campos (Belgium) M Geerts	6	3	[10]
