= 2023 ITF Men's World Tennis Tour (October–December) =

2023 edition of the third-tier tour for men's professional tennis

The 2023 ITF Men's World Tennis Tour is the 2023 edition of the second-tier tour for men's professional tennis. It is organised by the International Tennis Federation and is a tier below the ATP Challenger Tour. The ITF Men's World Tennis Tour includes tournaments with prize money ranging from $15,000 to $25,000.

Since 2022, following the Russian invasion of Ukraine, the ITF announced that players from Belarus and Russia could still play on the tour but would not be allowed to play under the flag of Belarus or Russia.

== Key ==
M25 tournaments
M15 tournaments

== Month ==
=== October ===
Week of	Tournament	Winner	Runners-up	Semifinalists	Quarterfinalists
October 2	Nevers, France; Hard (i); M25; Singles and Doubles Draws	(Germany) Marvin Möller; 2–6, 7–6^{(7–4)}, 6–4	(France) Sascha Gueymard Wayenburg	(Estonia) Daniil Glinka (Netherlands) Alec Deckers	(Belgium) Alexander Blockx (Switzerland) Jakub Paul; Nikolay Vylegzhanin (Germany) Marlon Vankan
October 2	Nevers, France; Hard (i); M25; Singles and Doubles Draws	(Germany) Jakob Schnaitter (Germany) Mark Wallner; 6–3, 6–4	(Switzerland) Jakub Paul (Switzerland) Yannik Steinegger	(Estonia) Daniil Glinka (Netherlands) Alec Deckers	(Belgium) Alexander Blockx (Switzerland) Jakub Paul; Nikolay Vylegzhanin (Germany) Marlon Vankan
October 2	Cairns, Australia; Hard; M25; Singles and Doubles Draws	(New Zealand) Ajeet Rai; 3–2, ret.	(Australia) Jeremy Beale	(Australia) Jake Delaney (Japan) Makoto Ochi	(Poland) Filip Peliwo (Australia) Blake Mott (Japan) Daisuke Sumizawa (Australia) Blake Ellis
October 2	Cairns, Australia; Hard; M25; Singles and Doubles Draws	(Australia) Kody Pearson (United States) Henrik Wiersholm; 6–2, 6–1	(Japan) Kokoro Isomura (Japan) Naoki Tajima	(Australia) Jake Delaney (Japan) Makoto Ochi	(Poland) Filip Peliwo (Australia) Blake Mott (Japan) Daisuke Sumizawa (Australia) Blake Ellis
October 2	Santa Margherita di Pula, Italy; Clay; M25; Singles and Doubles Draws	(Spain) Nikolás Sánchez Izquierdo; 6–0, 6–4	(Italy) Gabriele Piraino	(Portugal) Gonçalo Oliveira (Italy) Gianmarco Ferrari	(Switzerland) Kilian Feldbausch (Italy) Marcello Serafini (Italy) Giuseppe La Vela (Italy) Federico Iannaccone
October 2	Santa Margherita di Pula, Italy; Clay; M25; Singles and Doubles Draws	(Italy) Luca Potenza (Italy) Giorgio Ricca; 6–2, 6–1	(Japan) Ryuki Matsuda (Italy) Augusto Virgili	(Portugal) Gonçalo Oliveira (Italy) Gianmarco Ferrari	(Switzerland) Kilian Feldbausch (Italy) Marcello Serafini (Italy) Giuseppe La Vela (Italy) Federico Iannaccone
October 2	Pazardzhik, Bulgaria; Clay; M25; Singles and Doubles Draws	(Czech Republic) Martin Krumich; 4–6, 6–0, 6–4	(Romania) Nicholas David Ionel	(Switzerland) Damien Wenger (Ukraine) Eric Vanshelboim	Andrey Chepelev (Bulgaria) Gabriel Donev (Croatia) Matej Dodig (France) Clément Tabur
October 2	Pazardzhik, Bulgaria; Clay; M25; Singles and Doubles Draws	(Bulgaria) Gabriel Donev (Bulgaria) Simon Anthony Ivanov; 6–2, 6–1	(Croatia) Matej Dodig (Ukraine) Eric Vanshelboim	(Switzerland) Damien Wenger (Ukraine) Eric Vanshelboim	Andrey Chepelev (Bulgaria) Gabriel Donev (Croatia) Matej Dodig (France) Clément Tabur
October 2	Mendoza, Argentina; Clay; M25; Singles and Doubles Draws	(Peru) Ignacio Buse; 7–6^{(7–4)}, 6–3	(Argentina) Luciano Emanuel Ambrogi	(Argentina) Matías Franco Descotte (Peru) Arklon Huertas del Pino	(Argentina) Sean Hess (Argentina) Gonzalo Villanueva (Uruguay) Franco Roncadelli (Argentina) Alex Barrena
October 2	Mendoza, Argentina; Clay; M25; Singles and Doubles Draws	(Peru) Arklon Huertas del Pino (Peru) Conner Huertas del Pino; 6–4, 6–4	(Peru) Ignacio Buse (Bolivia) Juan Carlos Prado Ángelo	(Argentina) Matías Franco Descotte (Peru) Arklon Huertas del Pino	(Argentina) Sean Hess (Argentina) Gonzalo Villanueva (Uruguay) Franco Roncadelli (Argentina) Alex Barrena
October 2	Zaragoza, Spain; Clay; M25; Singles and Doubles Draws	(United Kingdom) Felix Gill; 6–4, 6–1	(Argentina) Julio César Porras	(Netherlands) Deney Wassermann (France) Mathys Erhard	(Monaco) Valentin Vacherot (Bulgaria) Iliyan Radulov (Spain) Carlos López Montagud (Netherlands) Ryan Nijboer
October 2	Zaragoza, Spain; Clay; M25; Singles and Doubles Draws	(Netherlands) Deney Wassermann (Netherlands) Miko Wassermann; 6–3, 3–6, [13–11]	(Spain) Rafael Izquierdo Luque (Latvia) Mārtiņš Rocēns	(Netherlands) Deney Wassermann (France) Mathys Erhard	(Monaco) Valentin Vacherot (Bulgaria) Iliyan Radulov (Spain) Carlos López Montagud (Netherlands) Ryan Nijboer
October 2	Ithaca, United States; Hard; M15; Singles and Doubles Draws	(Romania) Radu Mihai Papoe; 3–6, 6–1, 6–2	(Canada) Liam Draxl	(United States) Alex Rybakov (United States) Perry Gregg	(United States) Jake van Emburgh (Netherlands) Fons van Sambeek (United States) Ezekiel Clark (Ecuador) Ángel Díaz Jalil
October 2	Ithaca, United States; Hard; M15; Singles and Doubles Draws	(United States) Nathan Mao (United States) Adit Sinha; 6–4, 6–1	(Japan) Shunsuke Mitsui (Poland) Filip Pieczonka	(United States) Alex Rybakov (United States) Perry Gregg	(United States) Jake van Emburgh (Netherlands) Fons van Sambeek (United States) Ezekiel Clark (Ecuador) Ángel Díaz Jalil
October 2	Doha, Qatar; Hard; M15; Singles and Doubles Draws	Marat Sharipov; 7–6^{(7–4)}, 6–4	(Hong Kong) Coleman Wong	Boris Pokotilov (Denmark) Christian Sigsgaard	(Poland) Olaf Pieczkowski (France) Quentin Folliot (Germany) Christoph Negritu; Bogdan Bobrov
October 2	Doha, Qatar; Hard; M15; Singles and Doubles Draws	(France) Thomas Deschamps (France) Quentin Folliot; 6–2, 2–6, [10–4]	Boris Pokotilov (Germany) Paul Wörner	Boris Pokotilov (Denmark) Christian Sigsgaard	(Poland) Olaf Pieczkowski (France) Quentin Folliot (Germany) Christoph Negritu; Bogdan Bobrov
October 2	Sharm El Sheikh, Egypt; Hard; M15; Singles and Doubles Draws	(Egypt) Mohamed Safwat; 7–5, 7–5	(United Kingdom) Stuart Parker	(United Kingdom) Henry Searle (Brazil) Gabriel Décamps	(Netherlands) Mees Röttgering (Ukraine) Vadym Ursu (Uzbekistan) Sergey Fomin (Australia) Jacob Bradshaw
October 2	Sharm El Sheikh, Egypt; Hard; M15; Singles and Doubles Draws	(Uzbekistan) Sergey Fomin (Georgia (country)) Saba Purtseladze; 6–3, 6–4	(United Kingdom) Adam Jones (United Kingdom) Henry Searle	(United Kingdom) Henry Searle (Brazil) Gabriel Décamps	(Netherlands) Mees Röttgering (Ukraine) Vadym Ursu (Uzbekistan) Sergey Fomin (Australia) Jacob Bradshaw
October 2	Bad Waltersdorf, Austria; Clay; M15; Singles and Doubles Draws	(Serbia) Branko Đurić; 6–1, 6–2	(Poland) Marcel Zielinski	(Austria) Sebastian Sorger (Romania) Vlad Andrei Dancu	(Austria) David Pichler (Hungary) Mátyás Füle (Austria) Jan Kobierski (Germany) David Fix
October 2	Bad Waltersdorf, Austria; Clay; M15; Singles and Doubles Draws	(Germany) Tim Rühl (Germany) Patrick Zahraj; 4–6, 6–2, [10–2]	(Germany) Kai Lemstra (Austria) David Pichler	(Austria) Sebastian Sorger (Romania) Vlad Andrei Dancu	(Austria) David Pichler (Hungary) Mátyás Füle (Austria) Jan Kobierski (Germany) David Fix
October 2	Monastir, Tunisia; Hard; M15; Singles and Doubles Draws	(Germany) Kai Wehnelt; 4–6, 7–5, 6–3	(France) Constantin Bittoun Kouzmine	(France) Sean Cuenin (Slovakia) Peter Benjamín Privara	(Cyprus) Menelaos Efstathiou (France) Pierre Delage (Senegal) Seydina André (Dominican Republic) Roberto Cid Subervi
October 2	Monastir, Tunisia; Hard; M15; Singles and Doubles Draws	(Tunisia) Aziz Ouakaa (Germany) Kai Wehnelt; 6–4, 3–6, [10–5]	(United States) Thomas Brown (Cyprus) Menelaos Efstathiou	(France) Sean Cuenin (Slovakia) Peter Benjamín Privara	(Cyprus) Menelaos Efstathiou (France) Pierre Delage (Senegal) Seydina André (Dominican Republic) Roberto Cid Subervi
October 9	Cairns, Australia; Hard; M25; Singles and Doubles Draws	(Australia) Omar Jasika; 6–7^{(4–7)}, 6–4, 6–4	(Australia) Jake Delaney	(Australia) Blake Mott (Australia) Blake Ellis	(Australia) Pavle Marinkov (Japan) Kokoro Isomura (Australia) Zachary Viiala (Japan) Hikaru Shiraishi
October 9	Cairns, Australia; Hard; M25; Singles and Doubles Draws	(Australia) Jeremy Beale (Australia) Thomas Fancutt; 6–4, 6–4	(Chinese Taipei) Fu Hong-lin (Australia) Tomislav Edward Papac	(Australia) Blake Mott (Australia) Blake Ellis	(Australia) Pavle Marinkov (Japan) Kokoro Isomura (Australia) Zachary Viiala (Japan) Hikaru Shiraishi
October 9	Rodez, France; Hard (i); M25; Singles and Doubles Draws	(France) Alexis Gautier; 7–6^{(11–9)}, 6–1	(France) Tom Paris	(Estonia) Daniil Glinka (Germany) Marvin Möller	(France) Antoine Hoang (Lebanon) Hady Habib (France) Amaury Raynel (United Kingdom) Aidan McHugh
October 9	Rodez, France; Hard (i); M25; Singles and Doubles Draws	(France) Arthur Bouquier (Switzerland) Jakub Paul; 7–6^{(7–5)}, 6–3	(United Kingdom) Ben Jones (United Kingdom) Joshua Paris	(Estonia) Daniil Glinka (Germany) Marvin Möller	(France) Antoine Hoang (Lebanon) Hady Habib (France) Amaury Raynel (United Kingdom) Aidan McHugh
October 9	Santa Margherita di Pula, Italy; Clay; M25; Singles and Doubles Draws	(Italy) Salvatore Caruso; 6–7^{(4–7)}, 7–6^{(7–4)}, 6–3	(Italy) Marcello Serafini	(Italy) Gabriele Pennaforti (Portugal) Gonçalo Oliveira	(Italy) Giovanni Fonio (Germany) Timo Stodder (Netherlands) Max Houkes (Spain) Nikolás Sánchez Izquierdo
October 9	Santa Margherita di Pula, Italy; Clay; M25; Singles and Doubles Draws	(Netherlands) Thiemo de Bakker (Netherlands) Max Houkes; Walkover	(Italy) Gianmarco Ferrari (Italy) Marcello Serafini	(Italy) Gabriele Pennaforti (Portugal) Gonçalo Oliveira	(Italy) Giovanni Fonio (Germany) Timo Stodder (Netherlands) Max Houkes (Spain) Nikolás Sánchez Izquierdo
October 9	Telavi, Georgia; Clay; M25; Singles and Doubles Draws	(Czech Republic) Martin Krumich; 6–4, 6–4	(Romania) Nicholas David Ionel	(Czech Republic) Michael Vrbenský (Croatia) Nino Serdarušić	(Argentina) Juan Pablo Paz; Andrey Chepelev (Ukraine) Eric Vanshelboim (Ukraine) Viacheslav Bielinskyi
October 9	Telavi, Georgia; Clay; M25; Singles and Doubles Draws	(Ukraine) Viacheslav Bielinskyi (Moldova) Ilya Snițari; 6–3, 6–0	(Romania) Vlad Andrei Dumitru (Romania) Nicholas David Ionel	(Czech Republic) Michael Vrbenský (Croatia) Nino Serdarušić	(Argentina) Juan Pablo Paz; Andrey Chepelev (Ukraine) Eric Vanshelboim (Ukraine) Viacheslav Bielinskyi
October 9	Zapopan, Mexico; Clay; M25; Singles and Doubles Draws	(Peru) Ignacio Buse; 6–3, 7–6^{(7–1)}	(United States) Victor Lilov	(Mexico) Ernesto Escobedo (Italy) Lorenzo Claverie	(United States) Ryan Seggerman (Mexico) Alan Fernando Rubio Fierros (Canada) Juan Carlos Aguilar (Colombia) Johan Alexander Rodríguez
October 9	Zapopan, Mexico; Clay; M25; Singles and Doubles Draws	(United States) Ryan Seggerman (United States) Patrik Trhac; 6–2, 6–4	(Chile) Miguel Ángel Cabrera (Brazil) João Vítor Gonçalves Ceolin	(Mexico) Ernesto Escobedo (Italy) Lorenzo Claverie	(United States) Ryan Seggerman (Mexico) Alan Fernando Rubio Fierros (Canada) Juan Carlos Aguilar (Colombia) Johan Alexander Rodríguez
October 9	Tavira, Portugal; Hard; M25; Singles and Doubles Draws	(Portugal) Henrique Rocha; 6–4, 6–4	(France) Valentin Royer	(Ivory Coast) Eliakim Coulibaly (Germany) Sebastian Fanselow	(Portugal) Tiago Pereira (Portugal) Jaime Faria (Ukraine) Aleksandr Braynin (Italy) Andrea Guerrieri
October 9	Tavira, Portugal; Hard; M25; Singles and Doubles Draws	(Portugal) Jaime Faria (Portugal) Henrique Rocha; 6–3, 6–1	(Ukraine) Aleksandr Braynin (Austria) David Pichler	(Ivory Coast) Eliakim Coulibaly (Germany) Sebastian Fanselow	(Portugal) Tiago Pereira (Portugal) Jaime Faria (Ukraine) Aleksandr Braynin (Italy) Andrea Guerrieri
October 9	Lajeado, Brazil; Clay; M25; Singles and Doubles Draws	(Brazil) Pedro Sakamoto; 6–1, 6–1	(Brazil) Wilson Leite	(Uruguay) Franco Roncadelli (Argentina) Leonardo Aboian	(Brazil) Eduardo Ribeiro (Italy) Facundo Juárez (Peru) Arklon Huertas del Pino (Peru) Conner Huertas del Pino
October 9	Lajeado, Brazil; Clay; M25; Singles and Doubles Draws	(Brazil) Daniel Dutra da Silva (Brazil) Eduardo Ribeiro; 6–2, 7–6^{(10–8)}	(Brazil) Ryan Augusto dos Santos (Brazil) João Eduardo Schiessl	(Uruguay) Franco Roncadelli (Argentina) Leonardo Aboian	(Brazil) Eduardo Ribeiro (Italy) Facundo Juárez (Peru) Arklon Huertas del Pino (Peru) Conner Huertas del Pino
October 9	Vigo, Spain; Clay; M15; Singles and Doubles Draws	(Spain) Alejo Sánchez Quílez; 6–2, 6–1	(Spain) Jorge Martínez Martínez	(Netherlands) Michiel de Krom (Spain) Carlos Gimeno Valero	(Spain) Nicolás Álvarez Varona (Germany) Liam Gavrielides (Germany) Nicola Kuhn (Lithuania) Vilius Gaubas
October 9	Vigo, Spain; Clay; M15; Singles and Doubles Draws	(Netherlands) Sander Jong (Netherlands) Jesse Timmermans; 7–5, 7–6^{(7–2)}	Kirill Mishkin; Vitali Shvets	(Netherlands) Michiel de Krom (Spain) Carlos Gimeno Valero	(Spain) Nicolás Álvarez Varona (Germany) Liam Gavrielides (Germany) Nicola Kuhn (Lithuania) Vilius Gaubas
October 9	Doha, Qatar; Hard; M15; Singles and Doubles Draws	Marat Sharipov; 6–4, 7–6^{(7–2)}	Boris Pokotilov	(France) Pablo Trochu; Alexey Zakharov	(Czech Republic) Marek Gengel (Poland) Olaf Pieczkowski (Switzerland) Tanguy Genier (Germany) Christoph Negritu
October 9	Doha, Qatar; Hard; M15; Singles and Doubles Draws	Egor Agafonov; Marat Sharipov; 7–6^{(9–7)}, 6–2	Bogdan Bobrov (Kazakhstan) Grigoriy Lomakin	(France) Pablo Trochu; Alexey Zakharov	(Czech Republic) Marek Gengel (Poland) Olaf Pieczkowski (Switzerland) Tanguy Genier (Germany) Christoph Negritu
October 9	Ahmedabad, India; Hard; M15; Singles and Doubles Draws	(France) Florent Bax; 6–3, 7–5	(India) Ishaque Eqbal	(India) Karan Singh (India) Sidharth Rawat	(India) Digvijay Pratap Singh (India) S D Prajwal Dev (India) Raghev Jaisinghani (Netherlands) Stijn Pel
October 9	Ahmedabad, India; Hard; M15; Singles and Doubles Draws	(India) S D Prajwal Dev (India) Nitin Kumar Sinha; 7–6^{(7–2)}, 6–4	(Netherlands) Thijmen Loof (Netherlands) Stijn Pel	(India) Karan Singh (India) Sidharth Rawat	(India) Digvijay Pratap Singh (India) S D Prajwal Dev (India) Raghev Jaisinghani (Netherlands) Stijn Pel
October 9	Sharm El Sheikh, Egypt; Hard; M15; Singles and Doubles Draws	(South Africa) Philip Henning; 6–3, 6–3	(Ukraine) Vadym Ursu	(Italy) Luca Castagnola; Ilia Simakin	Artur Kukasian (Egypt) Amr Elsayed (Uzbekistan) Sergey Fomin (Bulgaria) Petr Nesterov
October 9	Sharm El Sheikh, Egypt; Hard; M15; Singles and Doubles Draws	(South Africa) Philip Henning (South Africa) Dylan Salton; 4–6, 6–4, [10–8]	(Italy) Alexandr Binda; Ilia Simakin	(Italy) Luca Castagnola; Ilia Simakin	Artur Kukasian (Egypt) Amr Elsayed (Uzbekistan) Sergey Fomin (Bulgaria) Petr Nesterov
October 9	Monastir, Tunisia; Hard; M15; Singles and Doubles Draws	(France) Maxence Beaugé; 6–4, 6–3	(Germany) Kai Wehnelt	(Germany) Tom Gentzsch (France) Maxence Rivet	(France) Cyril Vandermeersch (France) Adrien Gobat (Belgium) Jack Logé (Argentina) Guido Iván Justo
October 9	Monastir, Tunisia; Hard; M15; Singles and Doubles Draws	(Netherlands) Jurriaan Bol (Netherlands) Brian Bozemoj; 7–5, 7–5	(Germany) Adrian Oetzbach (Germany) Kai Wehnelt	(Germany) Tom Gentzsch (France) Maxence Rivet	(France) Cyril Vandermeersch (France) Adrien Gobat (Belgium) Jack Logé (Argentina) Guido Iván Justo
October 16	Edgbaston, United Kingdom; Hard (i); M25; Singles and Doubles Draws	(United Kingdom) Jacob Fearnley; 6–3, 6–1	(United Kingdom) Kyle Edmund	(United Kingdom) Toby Samuel (United Kingdom) Giles Hussey	(United Kingdom) Aidan McHugh (United Kingdom) Paul Jubb (United Kingdom) Henry Searle (France) Robin Bertrand
October 16	Edgbaston, United Kingdom; Hard (i); M25; Singles and Doubles Draws	(United Kingdom) Jacob Fearnley (United Kingdom) Connor Thomson; 7–6^{(7–2)}, 6–7^{(5–7)}, [10–7]	(United Kingdom) Charles Broom (United Kingdom) David Stevenson	(United Kingdom) Toby Samuel (United Kingdom) Giles Hussey	(United Kingdom) Aidan McHugh (United Kingdom) Paul Jubb (United Kingdom) Henry Searle (France) Robin Bertrand
October 16	Santa Margherita di Pula, Italy; Clay; M25; Singles and Doubles Draws	(United Kingdom) Felix Gill; 6–2, 6–4	(Spain) Oriol Roca Batalla	(Italy) Edoardo Lavagno (Bosnia and Herzegovina) Nerman Fatić	(Poland) Daniel Michalski (Spain) Carlos Sánchez Jover (Italy) Salvatore Caruso (Italy) Giovanni Fonio
October 16	Santa Margherita di Pula, Italy; Clay; M25; Singles and Doubles Draws	(Italy) Fausto Tabacco (Italy) Giorgio Tabacco; 6–4, 6–4	(Czech Republic) Filip Duda (Czech Republic) Lukáš Rosol	(Italy) Edoardo Lavagno (Bosnia and Herzegovina) Nerman Fatić	(Poland) Daniel Michalski (Spain) Carlos Sánchez Jover (Italy) Salvatore Caruso (Italy) Giovanni Fonio
October 16	Dharwad, India; Hard; M25; Singles and Doubles Draws	(India) Ramkumar Ramanathan; 7–6^{(7–5)}, 7–6^{(8–6)}	(India) Digvijay Pratap Singh	(United States) Nick Chappell; Bogdan Bobrov	(India) Sidharth Rawat (India) S D Prajwal Dev (Japan) Kazuki Nishiwaki (France) Florent Bax
October 16	Dharwad, India; Hard; M25; Singles and Doubles Draws	(India) S D Prajwal Dev (India) Nitin Kumar Sinha; 6–4, 6–3	(India) Sai Karteek Reddy Ganta (India) Manish Sureshkumar	(United States) Nick Chappell; Bogdan Bobrov	(India) Sidharth Rawat (India) S D Prajwal Dev (Japan) Kazuki Nishiwaki (France) Florent Bax
October 16	Telavi, Georgia; Clay; M25; Singles and Doubles Draws	(Czech Republic) Martin Krumich; 6–3, 6–7^{(7–9)}, 6–4	(Czech Republic) Michael Vrbenský	(Ukraine) Viacheslav Bielinskyi (Argentina) Juan Pablo Paz	(Romania) Nicholas David Ionel (Romania) Filip Cristian Jianu (Switzerland) Damien Wenger; Andrey Chepelev
October 16	Telavi, Georgia; Clay; M25; Singles and Doubles Draws	(France) Corentin Denolly (Switzerland) Damien Wenger; 6–0, 6–2	(New Zealand) Finn Reynolds (Israel) Roy Stepanov	(Ukraine) Viacheslav Bielinskyi (Argentina) Juan Pablo Paz	(Romania) Nicholas David Ionel (Romania) Filip Cristian Jianu (Switzerland) Damien Wenger; Andrey Chepelev
October 16	Tavira, Portugal; Hard; M25; Singles and Doubles Draws	(Germany) Sebastian Fanselow; 6–2, 6–3	(Portugal) Henrique Rocha	(Spain) Martín Landaluce (Portugal) Jaime Faria	(France) Clément Tabur (Netherlands) Twan van Zijl (Italy) Andrea Guerrieri (Ukraine) Aleksandr Braynin
October 16	Tavira, Portugal; Hard; M25; Singles and Doubles Draws	(Sweden) Simon Freund (Denmark) Johannes Ingildsen; 6–4, 4–6, [10–5]	(Portugal) João Domingues (Portugal) Gonçalo Falcão	(Spain) Martín Landaluce (Portugal) Jaime Faria	(France) Clément Tabur (Netherlands) Twan van Zijl (Italy) Andrea Guerrieri (Ukraine) Aleksandr Braynin
October 16	Morelia, Mexico; Hard; M15; Singles and Doubles Draws	(Brazil) Karue Sell; 7–5, 6–2	(Colombia) Johan Alexander Rodríguez	(United States) Elijah Strode (United States) Felix Corwin	(Venezuela) Ricardo Rodríguez-Pace (Japan) Leo Vithoontien (Republic of Ireland) Osgar O'Hoisin (Colombia) Juan Sebastián Osorio
October 16	Morelia, Mexico; Hard; M15; Singles and Doubles Draws	(Colombia) Juan Sebastián Gómez (Colombia) Johan Alexander Rodríguez; 6–2, 6–3	(Venezuela) Brandon Pérez (Venezuela) Ricardo Rodríguez-Pace	(United States) Elijah Strode (United States) Felix Corwin	(Venezuela) Ricardo Rodríguez-Pace (Japan) Leo Vithoontien (Republic of Ireland) Osgar O'Hoisin (Colombia) Juan Sebastián Osorio
October 16	Las Vegas, United States; Hard; M15; Singles and Doubles Draws	(Australia) Bernard Tomic; 6–1, 4–6, 6–2	(United States) Thai-Son Kwiatkowski	(Japan) Shunsuke Mitsui (Slovenia) Sebastian Dominko	(Germany) Luca Wiedenmann (Spain) Alex Martínez (Ecuador) Andrés Andrade (United States) Alexander Razeghi
October 16	Las Vegas, United States; Hard; M15; Singles and Doubles Draws	(Ecuador) Ángel Díaz Jalil (United Kingdom) Johannus Monday; 6–4, 6–4	(Ecuador) Andrés Andrade (United States) William Grant	(Japan) Shunsuke Mitsui (Slovenia) Sebastian Dominko	(Germany) Luca Wiedenmann (Spain) Alex Martínez (Ecuador) Andrés Andrade (United States) Alexander Razeghi
October 16	Heraklion, Greece; Hard; M15; Singles and Doubles Draws	(Czech Republic) Jakub Nicod; 6–2, 6–2	(Greece) Alexandros Skorilas	(Estonia) Oliver Ojakäär (United Kingdom) Stuart Parker	(Netherlands) Guy den Ouden (Ukraine) Oleg Prihodko (Brazil) Gabriel Décamps (Netherlands) Sidané Pontjodikromo
October 16	Heraklion, Greece; Hard; M15; Singles and Doubles Draws	(Switzerland) Dario Huber (Germany) Jacob Kahoun; 6–2, 6–2	(Greece) Dimitris Sakellaridis (Greece) Stefanos Sakellaridis	(Estonia) Oliver Ojakäär (United Kingdom) Stuart Parker	(Netherlands) Guy den Ouden (Ukraine) Oleg Prihodko (Brazil) Gabriel Décamps (Netherlands) Sidané Pontjodikromo
October 16	Castellón, Spain; Clay; M15; Singles and Doubles Draws	(Argentina) Guido Iván Justo; 6–3, 6–2	(Spain) Miguel Damas	(Ukraine) Georgii Kravchenko (Spain) Carlos López Montagud	(Spain) Max Alcalá Gurri (Hungary) Mátyás Füle (Spain) Nicolás Álvarez Varona (Spain) Sergi Pérez Contri
October 16	Castellón, Spain; Clay; M15; Singles and Doubles Draws	(Spain) Alejandro Manzanera Pertusa (Spain) Samuel Martínez Arjona; 6–4, 6–4	Kirill Mishkin; Vitali Shvets	(Ukraine) Georgii Kravchenko (Spain) Carlos López Montagud	(Spain) Max Alcalá Gurri (Hungary) Mátyás Füle (Spain) Nicolás Álvarez Varona (Spain) Sergi Pérez Contri
October 16	Villers-lès-Nancy, France; Hard (i); M15; Singles and Doubles Draws	(France) Amaury Raynel; 6–7^{(7–9)}, 7–5, 6–4	(France) Alexis Gautier	(Germany) Patrick Zahraj (France) Sascha Gueymard Wayenburg	(France) Louis Dussin (France) Émilien Voisin; Alexey Vatutin (France) Loann Massard
October 16	Villers-lès-Nancy, France; Hard (i); M15; Singles and Doubles Draws	(Sweden) Max Dahlin (Italy) Filippo Romano; 6–2, 6–2	(Germany) Jannik Opitz (Germany) Patrick Zahraj	(Germany) Patrick Zahraj (France) Sascha Gueymard Wayenburg	(France) Louis Dussin (France) Émilien Voisin; Alexey Vatutin (France) Loann Massard
October 16	Sharm El Sheikh, Egypt; Hard; M15; Singles and Doubles Draws	(Ukraine) Vadym Ursu; 6–4, 6–7^{(3–7)}, 6–2	(South Africa) Philip Henning	(Ukraine) Yurii Dzhavakian (United States) Harrison Adams	(Czech Republic) Marek Gengel (Italy) Alexandr Binda (Luxembourg) Alex Knaff (Egypt) Michael Bassem Sobhy
October 16	Sharm El Sheikh, Egypt; Hard; M15; Singles and Doubles Draws	(United Kingdom) Jay Clarke (Ukraine) Volodymyr Uzhylovskyi; 7–5, 7–5	(Czech Republic) Jan Hrazdil (Czech Republic) Jiří Barnat	(Ukraine) Yurii Dzhavakian (United States) Harrison Adams	(Czech Republic) Marek Gengel (Italy) Alexandr Binda (Luxembourg) Alex Knaff (Egypt) Michael Bassem Sobhy
October 16	Monastir, Tunisia; Hard; M15; Singles and Doubles Draws	(Tunisia) Aziz Dougaz; 7–6^{(7–3)}, 6–3	(France) Constantin Bittoun Kouzmine	(Spain) Alberto Barroso Campos (France) Adrien Gobat	(Germany) Tom Gentzsch (Slovakia) Michal Krajčí (Italy) Luca Giacomini (Tunisia) Skander Mansouri
October 16	Monastir, Tunisia; Hard; M15; Singles and Doubles Draws	(Tunisia) Skander Mansouri (Tunisia) Aziz Ouakaa; 7–6^{(7–5)}, 6–1	(Spain) Alberto Barroso Campos; Aleksandr Lobanov	(Spain) Alberto Barroso Campos (France) Adrien Gobat	(Germany) Tom Gentzsch (Slovakia) Michal Krajčí (Italy) Luca Giacomini (Tunisia) Skander Mansouri
October 23	Sarreguemines, France; Carpet (i); M25; Singles and Doubles Draws	(France) Tom Paris; 6–2, 6–1	Alexey Vatutin	(France) Dan Added (Germany) Tim Handel	(Uzbekistan) Khumoyun Sultanov (Morocco) Adam Moundir (France) Alexis Gautier (Croatia) Matej Dodig
October 23	Sarreguemines, France; Carpet (i); M25; Singles and Doubles Draws	(Germany) Jakob Schnaitter (Germany) Mark Wallner; 6–3, 5–7, [10–8]	(Germany) Jannik Opitz (Germany) Patrick Zahraj	(France) Dan Added (Germany) Tim Handel	(Uzbekistan) Khumoyun Sultanov (Morocco) Adam Moundir (France) Alexis Gautier (Croatia) Matej Dodig
October 23	Glasgow, United Kingdom; Hard (i); M25; Singles and Doubles Draws	(Belgium) Alexander Blockx; 5–7, 6–4, 6–2	(United Kingdom) Anton Matusevich	(United Kingdom) Hamish Stewart (United Kingdom) Jacob Fearnley	(United Kingdom) Paul Jubb (United Kingdom) Toby Samuel (Belgium) Tibo Colson (United Kingdom) Kyle Edmund
October 23	Glasgow, United Kingdom; Hard (i); M25; Singles and Doubles Draws	(United Kingdom) Finn Bass (United Kingdom) Millen Hurrion; 6–4, 6–7^{(5–7)}, [10–6]	(United Kingdom) George Houghton (United Kingdom) Hamish Stewart	(United Kingdom) Hamish Stewart (United Kingdom) Jacob Fearnley	(United Kingdom) Paul Jubb (United Kingdom) Toby Samuel (Belgium) Tibo Colson (United Kingdom) Kyle Edmund
October 23	Santa Margherita di Pula, Italy; Clay; M25; Singles and Doubles Draws	(Spain) Oriol Roca Batalla; 2–6, 6–1, 6–4	(Poland) Daniel Michalski	(Italy) Alexander Weis (Italy) Luciano Carraro	(Spain) Pol Martín Tiffon (Spain) Carlos Sánchez Jover (Italy) Giovanni Oradini (Bosnia and Herzegovina) Nerman Fatić
October 23	Santa Margherita di Pula, Italy; Clay; M25; Singles and Doubles Draws	(Italy) Giovanni Oradini (Italy) Alexander Weis; 7–6^{(7–1)}, 7–5	(Czech Republic) Filip Duda (Czech Republic) Roman Poštolka	(Italy) Alexander Weis (Italy) Luciano Carraro	(Spain) Pol Martín Tiffon (Spain) Carlos Sánchez Jover (Italy) Giovanni Oradini (Bosnia and Herzegovina) Nerman Fatić
October 23	Saint-Augustin, Canada; Hard (i); M25; Singles and Doubles Draws	(United Kingdom) Charles Broom; 6–7^{(5–7)}, 6–4, 6–2	(Tunisia) Aziz Dougaz	(United States) Aidan Mayo (United States) Strong Kirchheimer	(France) Clément Chidekh (United Kingdom) Giles Hussey (New Zealand) Kiranpal Pannu (Canada) Dan Martin
October 23	Saint-Augustin, Canada; Hard (i); M25; Singles and Doubles Draws	(France) Max Westphal (United States) Theodore Winegar; 4–6, 6–3, [11–9]	(United Kingdom) Charles Broom (United Kingdom) Ben Jones	(United States) Aidan Mayo (United States) Strong Kirchheimer	(France) Clément Chidekh (United Kingdom) Giles Hussey (New Zealand) Kiranpal Pannu (Canada) Dan Martin
October 23	Harlingen, United States; Hard; M25; Singles and Doubles Draws	(Denmark) August Holmgren; 6–3, 6–7^{(5–7)}, 6–1	(France) Raphael Perot	(Spain) Iván Marrero Curbelo (United States) Kyle Kang	(Argentina) Federico Agustín Gómez (United States) Marcus McDaniel (Brazil) Karue Sell (United States) Keshav Chopra
October 23	Harlingen, United States; Hard; M25; Singles and Doubles Draws	(United States) Ozan Baris (United States) Garrett Johns; 6–4, 5–7, [10–8]	(United States) Keshav Chopra (United States) Andres Martin	(Spain) Iván Marrero Curbelo (United States) Kyle Kang	(Argentina) Federico Agustín Gómez (United States) Marcus McDaniel (Brazil) Karue Sell (United States) Keshav Chopra
October 23	Norman, United States; Hard (i); M15; Singles and Doubles Draws	(United States) Learner Tien; 7–6^{(8–6)}, 6–2	(Portugal) Duarte Vale	(United States) Ryan Fishback; Danil Panarin	(Turkey) Arda Azkara (Mexico) Luis Carlos Álvarez Valdés (Spain) Alex Martínez (United States) Alexander Razeghi
October 23	Norman, United States; Hard (i); M15; Singles and Doubles Draws	(France) Robin Catry (Netherlands) Fons van Sambeek; 6–3, 6–4	(Chile) Matías Soto (United Kingdom) Mark Whitehouse	(United States) Ryan Fishback; Danil Panarin	(Turkey) Arda Azkara (Mexico) Luis Carlos Álvarez Valdés (Spain) Alex Martínez (United States) Alexander Razeghi
October 23	Tallahassee, United States; Hard (i); M15; Singles and Doubles Draws	(Australia) Jeremy Jin; 7–5, 6–3	(United States) Felix Corwin	(United States) Patrick Maloney (United Kingdom) James Connel	(France) Étienne Donnet (United Kingdom) Emile Hudd (United States) Karl Poling (United States) Axel Nefve
October 23	Tallahassee, United States; Hard (i); M15; Singles and Doubles Draws	(United Kingdom) Emile Hudd (United States) Patrick Maloney; 6–3, 6–3	(United States) Thomas Brown (United States) Axel Nefve	(United States) Patrick Maloney (United Kingdom) James Connel	(France) Étienne Donnet (United Kingdom) Emile Hudd (United States) Karl Poling (United States) Axel Nefve
October 23	Al Zahra, Kuwait; Hard; M15; Singles and Doubles Draws	(Bulgaria) Petr Nesterov; 4–6, 6–4, 6–3	(Portugal) Gonçalo Oliveira	(Georgia (country)) Aleksandre Bakshi (Slovenia) Bor Artnak	(Jordan) Mousa Alkotop (Slovakia) Peter Benjamín Privara (Serbia) Viktor Jović (Slovenia) Matic Dimic
October 23	Al Zahra, Kuwait; Hard; M15; Singles and Doubles Draws	(Slovenia) Bor Artnak (Slovenia) Matic Dimic; 6–3, 6–7^{(5–7)}, [10–6]	(Ukraine) Igor Dudun (Slovakia) Samuel Puškár	(Georgia (country)) Aleksandre Bakshi (Slovenia) Bor Artnak	(Jordan) Mousa Alkotop (Slovakia) Peter Benjamín Privara (Serbia) Viktor Jović (Slovenia) Matic Dimic
October 23	Davangere, India; Hard; M15; Singles and Doubles Draws	Bogdan Bobrov; 6–3, 7–6^{(7–4)}	(United States) Nick Chappell	(India) Niki Kaliyanda Poonacha (India) Ramkumar Ramanathan	(India) Sidharth Rawat (India) Manish Sureshkumar (India) Madhwin Kamath (India) Karan Singh
October 23	Davangere, India; Hard; M15; Singles and Doubles Draws	(India) Siddhant Banthia (India) Vishnu Vardhan; 6–2, 7–5	(India) Sai Karteek Reddy Ganta (India) Manish Sureshkumar	(India) Niki Kaliyanda Poonacha (India) Ramkumar Ramanathan	(India) Sidharth Rawat (India) Manish Sureshkumar (India) Madhwin Kamath (India) Karan Singh
October 23	Telavi, Georgia; Clay; M15; Singles and Doubles Draws	(Romania) Filip Cristian Jianu; 6–2, 6–0	Svyatoslav Gulin	(Romania) Nicholas David Ionel (Romania) Vlad Andrei Dancu	(Moldova) Ilya Snițari (Italy) Pietro Pampanin (Italy) Valerio Perruzza (Poland) Jasza Szajrych
October 23	Telavi, Georgia; Clay; M15; Singles and Doubles Draws	Teymuraz Gabashvili (Georgia (country)) Aleksandre Metreveli; 6–4, 6–4	(Kazakhstan) Grigoriy Lomakin (Georgia (country)) Zura Tkemaladze	(Romania) Nicholas David Ionel (Romania) Vlad Andrei Dancu	(Moldova) Ilya Snițari (Italy) Pietro Pampanin (Italy) Valerio Perruzza (Poland) Jasza Szajrych
October 23	Heraklion, Greece; Hard; M15; Singles and Doubles Draws	(France) Valentin Royer; 6–1, 6–1	(Czech Republic) Matthew William Donald	(Sweden) Adam Heinonen (Netherlands) Sidané Pontjodikromo	(Austria) Jonas Trinker (Netherlands) Guy den Ouden (Ukraine) Oleg Prihodko (Brazil) Gabriel Décamps
October 23	Heraklion, Greece; Hard; M15; Singles and Doubles Draws	(Cyprus) Stylianos Christodoulou (Cyprus) Eleftherios Neos; 2–6, 7–6^{(7–3)}, [10–8]	(Netherlands) Sidané Pontjodikromo (Netherlands) Niels Visker	(Sweden) Adam Heinonen (Netherlands) Sidané Pontjodikromo	(Austria) Jonas Trinker (Netherlands) Guy den Ouden (Ukraine) Oleg Prihodko (Brazil) Gabriel Décamps
October 23	Sharm El Sheikh, Egypt; Hard; M15; Singles and Doubles Draws	(Egypt) Mohamed Safwat; 6–4, 6–4	(Luxembourg) Alex Knaff	Daniel Khazime (Georgia (country)) Saba Purtseladze	(Egypt) Michael Bassem Sobhy (Ukraine) Yurii Dzhavakian; Ilia Simakin (United Kingdom) Jay Clarke
October 23	Sharm El Sheikh, Egypt; Hard; M15; Singles and Doubles Draws	(Czech Republic) Jiří Barnat (Czech Republic) Jan Hrazdil; 6–2, 6–4	Ilia Simakin; Pavel Verbin	Daniel Khazime (Georgia (country)) Saba Purtseladze	(Egypt) Michael Bassem Sobhy (Ukraine) Yurii Dzhavakian; Ilia Simakin (United Kingdom) Jay Clarke
October 23	Monastir, Tunisia; Hard; M15; Singles and Doubles Draws	(Spain) Alberto Barroso Campos; 6–1, 6–1	(Poland) Olaf Pieczkowski	(Argentina) Guido Iván Justo (France) Constantin Bittoun Kouzmine	(France) Mathys Erhard (France) Adrien Gobat (France) Cyril Vandermeersch (Germany) Adrian Oetzbach
October 23	Monastir, Tunisia; Hard; M15; Singles and Doubles Draws	(Algeria) Samir Hamza Reguig (France) Cyril Vandermeersch; 6–4, 3–6, [10–8]	(Poland) Olaf Pieczkowski (Germany) Max Wiskandt	(Argentina) Guido Iván Justo (France) Constantin Bittoun Kouzmine	(France) Mathys Erhard (France) Adrien Gobat (France) Cyril Vandermeersch (Germany) Adrian Oetzbach
October 30	Mulhouse, France; Hard (i); M25; Singles and Doubles Draws	(France) Maxime Janvier; 6–4, 6–4	(France) Émilien Voisin	(Czech Republic) Jonáš Forejtek (France) Lucas Poullain	(France) Yanis Ghazouani Durand (France) Adrien Gobat (Croatia) Matej Dodig; Nikolay Vylegzhanin
October 30	Mulhouse, France; Hard (i); M25; Singles and Doubles Draws	(France) Loann Massard (France) Yanis Ghazouani Durand; 3–2, ret.	(France) Dan Added (France) Arthur Bouquier	(Czech Republic) Jonáš Forejtek (France) Lucas Poullain	(France) Yanis Ghazouani Durand (France) Adrien Gobat (Croatia) Matej Dodig; Nikolay Vylegzhanin
October 30	Sunderland, United Kingdom; Hard (i); M25; Singles and Doubles Draws	(Belgium) Alexander Blockx; 4–6, 6–2, 6–4	(Belgium) Tibo Colson	(United Kingdom) Hamish Stewart (Germany) Marvin Möller	(France) Valentin Royer (United Kingdom) Daniel Cox (Netherlands) Sander Jong (Netherlands) Alec Deckers
October 30	Sunderland, United Kingdom; Hard (i); M25; Singles and Doubles Draws	(United Kingdom) David Stevenson (United Kingdom) Marcus Willis; 6–4, 7–6^{(7–3)}	(United Kingdom) James Davis (United Kingdom) Joshua Goodger	(United Kingdom) Hamish Stewart (Germany) Marvin Möller	(France) Valentin Royer (United Kingdom) Daniel Cox (Netherlands) Sander Jong (Netherlands) Alec Deckers
October 30	Edmonton, Canada; Hard (i); M25; Singles and Doubles Draws	(Canada) Justin Boulais; 3–6, 7–6^{(7–1)}, 6–0	(United Kingdom) Giles Hussey	(Canada) Liam Draxl (United Kingdom) Charles Broom	(Tunisia) Aziz Dougaz (France) Enzo Wallart (France) Clément Chidekh (United States) Andres Martin
October 30	Edmonton, Canada; Hard (i); M25; Singles and Doubles Draws	(South Africa) Vasilios Caripi (United Kingdom) Giles Hussey; Walkover	(Canada) Justin Boulais (Republic of Ireland) Osgar O'Hoisin	(Canada) Liam Draxl (United Kingdom) Charles Broom	(Tunisia) Aziz Dougaz (France) Enzo Wallart (France) Clément Chidekh (United States) Andres Martin
October 30	Sharm El Sheikh, Egypt; Hard; M25; Singles and Doubles Draws	(Latvia) Robert Strombachs; 6–7^{(4–7)}, 6–4, 3–0, ret.	Petr Bar Biryukov	(United States) Harrison Adams (South Africa) Kris van Wyk	(United Kingdom) Jay Clarke (Egypt) Mohamed Safwat; Marat Sharipov (France) Amaury Raynel
October 30	Sharm El Sheikh, Egypt; Hard; M25; Singles and Doubles Draws	Erik Arutiunian (South Africa) Kris van Wyk; 6–4, 6–7^{(1–7)}, [10–7]	Petr Bar Biryukov; Ilia Simakin	(United States) Harrison Adams (South Africa) Kris van Wyk	(United Kingdom) Jay Clarke (Egypt) Mohamed Safwat; Marat Sharipov (France) Amaury Raynel
October 30	Heraklion, Greece; Hard; M25; Singles and Doubles Draws	(Netherlands) Guy den Ouden; 6–2, 6–2	(France) Arthur Géa	(Netherlands) Niels Visker (Italy) Enrico Dalla Valle	(Romania) Sebastian Gima (Israel) Yshai Oliel (Netherlands) Guy den Heijer (Ukraine) Vladyslav Orlov
October 30	Heraklion, Greece; Hard; M25; Singles and Doubles Draws	(Italy) Francesco Forti (Italy) Filippo Romano; 4–6, 7–6^{(7–1)}, [10–4]	(Netherlands) Guy den Heijer (Netherlands) Dax Donders	(Netherlands) Niels Visker (Italy) Enrico Dalla Valle	(Romania) Sebastian Gima (Israel) Yshai Oliel (Netherlands) Guy den Heijer (Ukraine) Vladyslav Orlov
October 30	Fayetteville, United States; Hard; M15; Singles and Doubles Draws	(United States) Garrett Johns; 6–4, 6–2	(Australia) Derek Pham	(United States) Noah Schachter (Chile) Matías Soto	(Spain) Alex Martínez (Spain) Gerard Planelles Ripoll (United States) Tyler Stice (United States) Alexander Petrov
October 30	Fayetteville, United States; Hard; M15; Singles and Doubles Draws	(Slovenia) Sebastian Dominko (United States) Axel Nefve; 6–2, 6–4	(Chile) Matías Soto (United Kingdom) Mark Whitehouse	(United States) Noah Schachter (Chile) Matías Soto	(Spain) Alex Martínez (Spain) Gerard Planelles Ripoll (United States) Tyler Stice (United States) Alexander Petrov
October 30	Al Zahra, Kuwait; Hard; M15; Singles and Doubles Draws	(Bulgaria) Petr Nesterov; 6–4, 7–6^{(7–5)}	(Slovakia) Tomáš Lánik	(Germany) Niklas Schell (Slovenia) Bor Artnak	(Jordan) Mousa Alkotop (Belgium) Jack Logé (United Kingdom) Zach Stephens (Serbia) Viktor Jović
October 30	Al Zahra, Kuwait; Hard; M15; Singles and Doubles Draws	(Slovakia) Tomáš Lánik (Slovakia) Samuel Puškár; 6–3, 6–2	(Ukraine) Volodymyr Iakubenko (Belgium) Jack Logé	(Germany) Niklas Schell (Slovenia) Bor Artnak	(Jordan) Mousa Alkotop (Belgium) Jack Logé (United Kingdom) Zach Stephens (Serbia) Viktor Jović
October 30	Selva Gardena, Italy; Hard (i); M15; Singles and Doubles Draws	(Italy) Stefano Napolitano; 7–5, 6–4	(Germany) Adrian Oetzbach	(Austria) Sandro Kopp (Italy) Giovanni Oradini	(Czech Republic) Hynek Bartoň (Italy) Alessandro Pecci (Italy) Lorenzo Rottoli (Italy) Leonardo Malgaroli
October 30	Selva Gardena, Italy; Hard (i); M15; Singles and Doubles Draws	(Germany) Kai Lemstra (Germany) Patrick Zahraj; 6–2, 6–2	(Italy) Andrea Colombo (Italy) Leonardo Malgaroli	(Austria) Sandro Kopp (Italy) Giovanni Oradini	(Czech Republic) Hynek Bartoň (Italy) Alessandro Pecci (Italy) Lorenzo Rottoli (Italy) Leonardo Malgaroli
October 30	Villa María, Argentina; Clay; M15; Singles and Doubles Draws	(Argentina) Franco Emanuel Egea; 6–1, 6–4	(Mexico) Alan Fernando Rubio Fierros	(Argentina) Luciano Emanuel Ambrogi (Argentina) Lorenzo Joaquín Rodríguez	(Argentina) Leonardo Aboian (Argentina) Lautaro Midón (Uruguay) Joaquín Aguilar Cardozo (Argentina) Matías Franco Descotte
October 30	Villa María, Argentina; Clay; M15; Singles and Doubles Draws	(Argentina) Mateo del Pino (Argentina) Juan Manuel La Serna; 6–1, 7–6^{(9–7)}	(Argentina) Luciano Emanuel Ambrogi (Argentina) Alejo Lorenzo Lingua Lavallén	(Argentina) Luciano Emanuel Ambrogi (Argentina) Lorenzo Joaquín Rodríguez	(Argentina) Leonardo Aboian (Argentina) Lautaro Midón (Uruguay) Joaquín Aguilar Cardozo (Argentina) Matías Franco Descotte
October 30	Monastir, Tunisia; Hard; M15; Singles and Doubles Draws	(Morocco) Elliot Benchetrit; 6–2, 6–3	(Poland) Olaf Pieczkowski	(Portugal) Tiago Pereira (Bulgaria) Alexander Donski	(France) Louis Tessa (France) Cyril Vandermeersch (Germany) Max Wiskandt (Germany) John Sperle
October 30	Monastir, Tunisia; Hard; M15; Singles and Doubles Draws	(Netherlands) Daniel de Jonge (Germany) John Sperle; Walkover	(Bulgaria) Alexander Donski (Portugal) Tiago Pereira	(Portugal) Tiago Pereira (Bulgaria) Alexander Donski	(France) Louis Tessa (France) Cyril Vandermeersch (Germany) Max Wiskandt (Germany) John Sperle

=== November ===
Week of	Tournament	Winner	Runners-up	Semifinalists	Quarterfinalists
November 6	Benicarló, Spain; Clay; M25; Singles and Doubles Draws	(Spain) Miguel Damas; 6–3, 7–6^{(7–5)}	(Spain) Javier Barranco Cosano	(Spain) Alejandro Moro Cañas (Spain) Imanol López Morillo	(Spain) Alejo Sánchez Quílez (Serbia) Miljan Zekić (Spain) Carlos Gimeno Valero (Spain) Carlos López Montagud
November 6	Benicarló, Spain; Clay; M25; Singles and Doubles Draws	(France) Kenny de Schepper (Lithuania) Vilius Gaubas; 7–6^{(7–2)}, 3–6, [10–8]	(Bulgaria) Anthony Genov (Spain) Iker Urribarrens Ramírez	(Spain) Alejandro Moro Cañas (Spain) Imanol López Morillo	(Spain) Alejo Sánchez Quílez (Serbia) Miljan Zekić (Spain) Carlos Gimeno Valero (Spain) Carlos López Montagud
November 6	Trnava, Slovakia; Hard (i); M25; Singles and Doubles Draws	(Sweden) Karl Friberg; 6–4, 6–4	(Slovakia) Lukáš Pokorný	(Switzerland) Rémy Bertola (Sweden) Jonathan Mridha	(Czech Republic) Matěj Vocel (Netherlands) Sander Jong (United Kingdom) Anton Matusevich (Belgium) Tibo Colson
November 6	Trnava, Slovakia; Hard (i); M25; Singles and Doubles Draws	(Czech Republic) Daniel Pátý (Czech Republic) David Poljak; Walkover	(Sweden) Karl Friberg (Sweden) Jonathan Mridha	(Switzerland) Rémy Bertola (Sweden) Jonathan Mridha	(Czech Republic) Matěj Vocel (Netherlands) Sander Jong (United Kingdom) Anton Matusevich (Belgium) Tibo Colson
November 6	Austin, United States; Hard; M25; Singles and Doubles Draws	(Belgium) Pierre-Yves Bailly; 2–6, 6–4, 6–3	(United States) Siem Woldeab	(United States) Learner Tien (United States) Eliot Spizzirri	(Portugal) Duarte Vale (Australia) Edward Winter (United States) Colin Markes (United States) Micah Braswell
November 6	Austin, United States; Hard; M25; Singles and Doubles Draws	(United States) Learner Tien (Australia) Edward Winter; 4–6, 6–3, [10–2]	(United States) Sebastian Gorzny (United States) Brayden Michna	(United States) Learner Tien (United States) Eliot Spizzirri	(Portugal) Duarte Vale (Australia) Edward Winter (United States) Colin Markes (United States) Micah Braswell
November 6	Sharm El Sheikh, Egypt; Hard; M25; Singles and Doubles Draws	(Ukraine) Yurii Dzhavakian; 7–6^{(7–2)}, 2–6, 6–2	(Ukraine) Vadym Ursu	(Slovenia) Bor Artnak (Georgia (country)) Saba Purtseladze	(Egypt) Amr Elsayed (South Africa) Kris van Wyk; Marat Sharipov (Latvia) Robert Strombachs
November 6	Sharm El Sheikh, Egypt; Hard; M25; Singles and Doubles Draws	Petr Bar Biryukov; Ilia Simakin; 4–6, 6–3, [10–7]	(Ukraine) Vadym Ursu (Germany) Louis Wessels	(Slovenia) Bor Artnak (Georgia (country)) Saba Purtseladze	(Egypt) Amr Elsayed (South Africa) Kris van Wyk; Marat Sharipov (Latvia) Robert Strombachs
November 6	Heraklion, Greece; Hard; M25; Singles and Doubles Draws	(France) Arthur Géa; 2–6, 6–3, 6–2	(Romania) Cezar Crețu	(Netherlands) Guy den Heijer (Ukraine) Vladyslav Orlov	(United Kingdom) Harry Wendelken (Netherlands) Sidané Pontjodikromo (Israel) Yshai Oliel (Italy) Francesco Forti
November 6	Heraklion, Greece; Hard; M25; Singles and Doubles Draws	(Sweden) Simon Freund (Ukraine) Vladyslav Orlov; 6–7^{(4–7)}, 6–4, [10–7]	(Greece) Markos Kalovelonis (Cyprus) Sergis Kyratzis	(Netherlands) Guy den Heijer (Ukraine) Vladyslav Orlov	(United Kingdom) Harry Wendelken (Netherlands) Sidané Pontjodikromo (Israel) Yshai Oliel (Italy) Francesco Forti
November 6	Monastir, Tunisia; Hard; M25; Singles and Doubles Draws	(France) Clément Tabur; 3–6, 6–3, 6–4	(Lebanon) Hady Habib	Nikolay Vylegzhanin (South Africa) Philip Henning	(Italy) Fabrizio Andaloro (Ivory Coast) Eliakim Coulibaly (Netherlands) Ryan Nijboer (Netherlands) Stijn Slump
November 6	Monastir, Tunisia; Hard; M25; Singles and Doubles Draws	(Tunisia) Aziz Ouakaa (United Kingdom) Oscar Weightman; 7–5, 6–3	(Argentina) Tomás Lipovšek Puches (Italy) Andrea Picchione	Nikolay Vylegzhanin (South Africa) Philip Henning	(Italy) Fabrizio Andaloro (Ivory Coast) Eliakim Coulibaly (Netherlands) Ryan Nijboer (Netherlands) Stijn Slump
November 6	Hua Hin, Thailand; Hard; M15; Singles and Doubles Draws	(United States) Andre Ilagan; 6–3, ret.	(Portugal) Gonçalo Oliveira	(Thailand) Wishaya Trongcharoenchaikul (Poland) Filip Peliwo	(Switzerland) Matteo Lavizzari (Chinese Taipei) Yin Bang-shuo (China) Xiao Linang (China) Zhang Tianhui
November 6	Hua Hin, Thailand; Hard; M15; Singles and Doubles Draws	(Australia) Blake Bayldon (Australia) Kody Pearson; 6–3, 6–4	(Chinese Taipei) Huang Tsung-hao (Chinese Taipei) Yin Bang-shuo	(Thailand) Wishaya Trongcharoenchaikul (Poland) Filip Peliwo	(Switzerland) Matteo Lavizzari (Chinese Taipei) Yin Bang-shuo (China) Xiao Linang (China) Zhang Tianhui
November 6	Winston-Salem, United States; Hard; M15; Singles and Doubles Draws	(United States) Garrett Johns; 2–6, 6–0, 6–0	(India) Dhakshineswar Suresh	(Spain) Pedro Ródenas (Argentina) Luciano Tacchi	(United States) Ishaan Ravichander (France) Robin Catry (Argentina) Franco Capalbo (United Kingdom) Emile Hudd
November 6	Winston-Salem, United States; Hard; M15; Singles and Doubles Draws	(United States) Keshav Chopra (United States) Marcus McDaniel; 6–2, 4–6, [12–10]	(United Kingdom) Luca Pow (Argentina) Luciano Tacchi	(Spain) Pedro Ródenas (Argentina) Luciano Tacchi	(United States) Ishaan Ravichander (France) Robin Catry (Argentina) Franco Capalbo (United Kingdom) Emile Hudd
November 6	Santo Domingo, Dominican Republic; Hard; M15; Singles and Doubles Draws	(United States) Bruno Kuzuhara; 7–5, 7–5	(Argentina) Facundo Mena	(Dominican Republic) Roberto Cid Subervi (United States) Felix Corwin	(Germany) Taym Al Azmeh (Brazil) Paulo André Saraiva dos Santos (United States) Jacob Brumm (United States) Henrik Wiersholm
November 6	Santo Domingo, Dominican Republic; Hard; M15; Singles and Doubles Draws	Doubles competition was abandoned due to ongoing poor weather		(Dominican Republic) Roberto Cid Subervi (United States) Felix Corwin	(Germany) Taym Al Azmeh (Brazil) Paulo André Saraiva dos Santos (United States) Jacob Brumm (United States) Henrik Wiersholm
November 6	Rosario, Argentina; Clay; M15; Singles and Doubles Draws	(Bolivia) Juan Carlos Prado Ángelo; 6–3, 4–6, 7–6^{(9–7)}	(Argentina) Lorenzo Joaquín Rodríguez	(Argentina) Alejo Lorenzo Lingua Lavallén (Argentina) Luciano Emanuel Ambrogi	(Uruguay) Franco Roncadelli (Argentina) Juan Pablo Paz (Argentina) Franco Emanuel Egea (Argentina) Lautaro Midón
November 6	Rosario, Argentina; Clay; M15; Singles and Doubles Draws	(Argentina) Mateo del Pino (Argentina) Juan Manuel La Serna; 6–3, 7–6^{(7–1)}	(Argentina) Mariano Kestelboim (Bolivia) Juan Carlos Prado Ángelo	(Argentina) Alejo Lorenzo Lingua Lavallén (Argentina) Luciano Emanuel Ambrogi	(Uruguay) Franco Roncadelli (Argentina) Juan Pablo Paz (Argentina) Franco Emanuel Egea (Argentina) Lautaro Midón
November 6	Antalya, Turkey; Clay; M15; Singles and Doubles Draws	(Romania) Filip Cristian Jianu; 6–3, 6–2	(Italy) Gabriele Pennaforti	(Hungary) Mátyás Füle (Germany) Tim Handel	Evgenii Tiurnev (Ukraine) Eric Vanshelboim (Ukraine) Viacheslav Bielinskyi (Romania) Dan Alexandru Tomescu
November 6	Antalya, Turkey; Clay; M15; Singles and Doubles Draws	(Ukraine) Illya Beloborodko (Ukraine) Viacheslav Bielinskyi; 7–6^{(7–4)}, 6–3	(Romania) Călin Manda (Romania) Mihai Răzvan Marinescu	(Hungary) Mátyás Füle (Germany) Tim Handel	Evgenii Tiurnev (Ukraine) Eric Vanshelboim (Ukraine) Viacheslav Bielinskyi (Romania) Dan Alexandru Tomescu
November 6	Monastir, Tunisia; Hard; M15; Singles and Doubles Draws	Egor Agafonov; 6–4, 4–6, 7–6^{(9–7)}	(Germany) Max Wiskandt	(Argentina) Juan Bautista Otegui (Germany) Liam Gavrielides	Bogdan Bobrov (Germany) Tom Gentzsch (Chile) Diego Fernández Flores (Germany) Christoph Negritu
November 6	Monastir, Tunisia; Hard; M15; Singles and Doubles Draws	Egor Agafonov; Bogdan Bobrov; 6–3, 4–6, [10–3]	(Peru) Alexander Merino (Germany) Christoph Negritu	(Argentina) Juan Bautista Otegui (Germany) Liam Gavrielides	Bogdan Bobrov (Germany) Tom Gentzsch (Chile) Diego Fernández Flores (Germany) Christoph Negritu
November 13	Antalya, Turkey; Clay; M25; Singles and Doubles Draws	(Germany) Tim Handel; 6–3, 1–6, 6–3	(Italy) Alexander Weis	(Romania) Călin Manda (United Kingdom) Jay Clarke	(Serbia) Marko Maksimović (Romania) Dan Alexandru Tomescu (Germany) Timo Stodder (Romania) Nicholas David Ionel
November 13	Antalya, Turkey; Clay; M25; Singles and Doubles Draws	(Czech Republic) Patrik Rikl (Germany) Timo Stodder; 6–4, 6–2	(Romania) Alexandru Jecan (Romania) Dan Alexandru Tomescu	(Romania) Călin Manda (United Kingdom) Jay Clarke	(Serbia) Marko Maksimović (Romania) Dan Alexandru Tomescu (Germany) Timo Stodder (Romania) Nicholas David Ionel
November 13	Vale do Lobo, Portugal; Hard; M25; Singles and Doubles Draws	(Portugal) Henrique Rocha; 6–3, 6–1	(Czech Republic) Hynek Bartoň	(Belgium) Michael Geerts (Uzbekistan) Khumoyun Sultanov	(Portugal) Tiago Pereira (Portugal) Francisco Rocha (Portugal) Jaime Faria (France) Lucas Poullain
November 13	Vale do Lobo, Portugal; Hard; M25; Singles and Doubles Draws	(Portugal) Francisco Rocha (Portugal) Henrique Rocha; 3–0, ret.	(Czech Republic) Hynek Bartoň (Czech Republic) Michal Lušovský	(Belgium) Michael Geerts (Uzbekistan) Khumoyun Sultanov	(Portugal) Tiago Pereira (Portugal) Francisco Rocha (Portugal) Jaime Faria (France) Lucas Poullain
November 13	Monastir, Tunisia; Hard; M25; Singles and Doubles Draws	(Lebanon) Hady Habib; 6–4, 6–4	(Latvia) Robert Strombachs	(Italy) Gian Marco Moroni; Bogdan Bobrov	(France) Clément Tabur (United Kingdom) Toby Martin (Turkey) Ergi Kırkın (Italy) Fabrizio Andaloro
November 13	Monastir, Tunisia; Hard; M25; Singles and Doubles Draws	Aleksandr Lobanov; Alexey Nesterov; 3–6, 6–2, [10–8]	(Italy) Fabrizio Andaloro (Algeria) Samir Hamza Reguig	(Italy) Gian Marco Moroni; Bogdan Bobrov	(France) Clément Tabur (United Kingdom) Toby Martin (Turkey) Ergi Kırkın (Italy) Fabrizio Andaloro
November 13	Columbus, United States; Hard (i); M25; Singles and Doubles Draws	(United States) Learner Tien; 2–0, ret.	(United Kingdom) Jacob Fearnley	(Japan) Shunsuke Mitsui (United States) Robert Cash	(Romania) Radu Mihai Papoe (Canada) Taha Baadi (Thailand) Pawit Sornlaksup (United States) Adam Neff
November 13	Columbus, United States; Hard (i); M25; Singles and Doubles Draws	(United States) Robert Cash (United States) Bryce Nakashima; 7–5, 7–6^{(12–10)}	(Japan) Shunsuke Mitsui (United Kingdom) Johannus Monday	(Japan) Shunsuke Mitsui (United States) Robert Cash	(Romania) Radu Mihai Papoe (Canada) Taha Baadi (Thailand) Pawit Sornlaksup (United States) Adam Neff
November 13	Hua Hin, Thailand; Hard (i); M25; Singles and Doubles Draws	(Portugal) Gonçalo Oliveira; 4–6, 6–2, 6–4	Evgeny Donskoy	(Australia) Moerani Bouzige (Chinese Taipei) Huang Tsung-hao	(China) Cui Jie (Vietnam) Lý Hoàng Nam (South Korea) Han Seon-yong (Thailand) Thantub Suksumrarn
November 13	Hua Hin, Thailand; Hard (i); M25; Singles and Doubles Draws	(Chinese Taipei) Huang Tsung-hao (Japan) Shintaro Imai; 6–1, 6–0	(Japan) Koki Matsuda (Japan) Ryota Tanuma	(Australia) Moerani Bouzige (Chinese Taipei) Huang Tsung-hao	(China) Cui Jie (Vietnam) Lý Hoàng Nam (South Korea) Han Seon-yong (Thailand) Thantub Suksumrarn
November 13	Heraklion, Greece; Hard; M15; Singles and Doubles Draws	(France) Arthur Géa; 5–2, ret.	(Czech Republic) Jakub Nicod	(Luxembourg) Alex Knaff (Morocco) Younes Lalami Laaroussi	(Israel) Yshai Oliel (United Kingdom) Sean Hodkin (Slovenia) Matic Križnik (Romania) Sebastian Gima
November 13	Heraklion, Greece; Hard; M15; Singles and Doubles Draws	(Austria) Neil Oberleitner (Austria) Joel Schwärzler; 6–0, 6–3	(Cyprus) Sergis Kyratzis (Cyprus) Eleftherios Neos	(Luxembourg) Alex Knaff (Morocco) Younes Lalami Laaroussi	(Israel) Yshai Oliel (United Kingdom) Sean Hodkin (Slovenia) Matic Križnik (Romania) Sebastian Gima
November 13	Kuching, Malaysia; Hard; M15; Singles and Doubles Draws	(Japan) Hikaru Shiraishi; 6–0, 1–0, ret.	(United States) Andre Ilagan	Alexey Zakharov (Japan) Taiyo Yamanaka	(Japan) Yuta Kawahashi (Japan) Kokoro Isomura (South Korea) Shin Woo-bin (Switzerland) Luca Castelnuovo
November 13	Kuching, Malaysia; Hard; M15; Singles and Doubles Draws	(South Korea) Jeong Yeong-seok (South Korea) Shin Woo-bin; 7–5, 5–7, [10–7]	(Netherlands) Thijmen Loof (Austria) David Pichler	Alexey Zakharov (Japan) Taiyo Yamanaka	(Japan) Yuta Kawahashi (Japan) Kokoro Isomura (South Korea) Shin Woo-bin (Switzerland) Luca Castelnuovo
November 13	East Lansing, United States; Hard (i); M15; Singles and Doubles Draws	(United States) Ozan Baris; 6–2, 6–1	(United States) Samir Banerjee	(United States) William Grant (United States) Eliot Spizzirri	(United States) Alafia Ayeni (Turkey) Arda Azkara (Greece) Aristotelis Thanos (United States) Perry Gregg
November 13	East Lansing, United States; Hard (i); M15; Singles and Doubles Draws	(France) Robin Catry (Netherlands) Fons van Sambeek; 6–3, 6–4	(United States) Alafia Ayeni (United Kingdom) Matthew Rankin	(United States) William Grant (United States) Eliot Spizzirri	(United States) Alafia Ayeni (Turkey) Arda Azkara (Greece) Aristotelis Thanos (United States) Perry Gregg
November 13	Boca Raton, United States; Clay; M15; Singles and Doubles Draws	(Switzerland) Kilian Feldbausch; 6–4, 7–5	(United States) Garrett Johns	(Argentina) Federico Agustín Gómez (United States) Victor Lilov	(Sweden) Arvid Nordquist (Kazakhstan) Dmitry Popko (Spain) Alberto Colás Sánchez (Argentina) Matías Franco Descotte
November 13	Boca Raton, United States; Clay; M15; Singles and Doubles Draws	(Australia) Lawrence Sciglitano (Australia) Thomas Pavlekovich Smith; 7–6^{(7–3)}, 4–6, [13–11]	(Sweden) Erik Grevelius (Canada) Alvin Nicholas Tudorica	(Argentina) Federico Agustín Gómez (United States) Victor Lilov	(Sweden) Arvid Nordquist (Kazakhstan) Dmitry Popko (Spain) Alberto Colás Sánchez (Argentina) Matías Franco Descotte
November 13	Santo Domingo, Dominican Republic; Hard; M15; Singles and Doubles Draws	(United States) Bruno Kuzuhara; 6–1, 6–0	(Argentina) Facundo Mena	(Dominican Republic) Roberto Cid Subervi (Dominican Republic) Peter Bertran	(Japan) Kosuke Ogura (Colombia) Alejandro Hoyos Franco (Venezuela) Ricardo Rodríguez-Pace (United States) Henrik Wiersholm
November 13	Santo Domingo, Dominican Republic; Hard; M15; Singles and Doubles Draws	(Belgium) Maikel De Boes (Poland) Piotr Galus; 7–5, 6–4	(Ghana) Abraham Asaba (Ghana) Isaac Nortey	(Dominican Republic) Roberto Cid Subervi (Dominican Republic) Peter Bertran	(Japan) Kosuke Ogura (Colombia) Alejandro Hoyos Franco (Venezuela) Ricardo Rodríguez-Pace (United States) Henrik Wiersholm
November 13	Cochabamba, Bolivia; Clay; M15; Singles and Doubles Draws	(Argentina) Valerio Aboian; 6–3, 6–7^{(7–9)}, 7–6^{(7–2)}	(Argentina) Tomás Farjat	(Argentina) Ignacio Monzón (Argentina) Leonardo Aboian	(Brazil) João Victor Couto Loureiro (Chile) Nicolás Villalón Valdés (Argentina) Sean Hess (Argentina) Fermín Tenti
November 13	Cochabamba, Bolivia; Clay; M15; Singles and Doubles Draws	(Argentina) Leonardo Aboian (Argentina) Bautista Vilicich; 7–6^{(7–5)}, 6–2	(Venezuela) Brandon Pérez (Mexico) Alan Fernando Rubio Fierros	(Argentina) Ignacio Monzón (Argentina) Leonardo Aboian	(Brazil) João Victor Couto Loureiro (Chile) Nicolás Villalón Valdés (Argentina) Sean Hess (Argentina) Fermín Tenti
November 13	Valencia, Spain; Clay; M15; Singles and Doubles Draws	(Argentina) Marco Trungelliti; 6–0, 6–2	(Spain) Carlos Gimeno Valero	(Lithuania) Vilius Gaubas (Spain) Diego Augusto Barreto Sánchez	Svyatoslav Gulin (Spain) Martín Landaluce (Spain) Alejandro Melero Kretzer (Ukraine) Georgii Kravchenko
November 13	Valencia, Spain; Clay; M15; Singles and Doubles Draws	(New Zealand) Finn Reynolds (Ukraine) Volodymyr Uzhylovskyi; 6–3, 6–0	(Romania) Alexandru Cristian Dumitru (Croatia) Kristian Tumbas Kajgo	(Lithuania) Vilius Gaubas (Spain) Diego Augusto Barreto Sánchez	Svyatoslav Gulin (Spain) Martín Landaluce (Spain) Alejandro Melero Kretzer (Ukraine) Georgii Kravchenko
November 13	Sharm El Sheikh, Egypt; Hard; M15; Singles and Doubles Draws	(Ukraine) Vadym Ursu; 1–6, 6–1, 6–2	(Slovenia) Bor Artnak	(South Africa) Alec Beckley; Petr Bar Biryukov	(South Africa) Kris van Wyk; Evgeny Philippov (Georgia (country)) Zura Tkemaladze (France) Amaury Raynel
November 13	Sharm El Sheikh, Egypt; Hard; M15; Singles and Doubles Draws	(Kazakhstan) Grigoriy Lomakin; Evgeny Philippov; 6–2, 7–5	(Italy) Tommaso Compagnucci (Serbia) Viktor Jović	(South Africa) Alec Beckley; Petr Bar Biryukov	(South Africa) Kris van Wyk; Evgeny Philippov (Georgia (country)) Zura Tkemaladze (France) Amaury Raynel
November 13	Monastir, Tunisia; Hard; M15; Singles and Doubles Draws	(France) Maxence Rivet; 6–3, 6–7^{(3–7)}, 7–5	(Italy) Massimo Giunta	(Italy) Andrea Picchione (Germany) Christoph Negritu	(Germany) Liam Gavrielides (Switzerland) Jakub Paul (Italy) Luca Giacomini (Algeria) Nazim Makhlouf
November 13	Monastir, Tunisia; Hard; M15; Singles and Doubles Draws	(Switzerland) Jakub Paul (Germany) Jakob Schnaitter; 7–6^{(7–5)}, 7–5	(Peru) Alexander Merino (Germany) Christoph Negritu	(Italy) Andrea Picchione (Germany) Christoph Negritu	(Germany) Liam Gavrielides (Switzerland) Jakub Paul (Italy) Luca Giacomini (Algeria) Nazim Makhlouf
November 20	Antalya, Turkey; Clay; M25; Singles and Doubles Draws	(United Kingdom) Jay Clarke; 6–4, 7–5	(Bosnia and Herzegovina) Nerman Fatić	(Italy) Alexander Weis (Germany) Tim Handel	(Bulgaria) Yanaki Milev (Austria) Sandro Kopp (Moldova) Ilya Snițari (Romania) Nicholas David Ionel
November 20	Antalya, Turkey; Clay; M25; Singles and Doubles Draws	(United Kingdom) Jay Clarke (Croatia) Josip Šimundža; 1–6, 7–6^{(10–8)}, [10–8]	(Turkey) Cengiz Aksu (Turkey) Mert Naci Türker	(Italy) Alexander Weis (Germany) Tim Handel	(Bulgaria) Yanaki Milev (Austria) Sandro Kopp (Moldova) Ilya Snițari (Romania) Nicholas David Ionel
November 20	Vale do Lobo, Portugal; Hard; M25; Singles and Doubles Draws	(Uzbekistan) Khumoyun Sultanov; 6–4, 7–6^{(13–11)}	(France) Jules Marie	(Portugal) Henrique Rocha (United Kingdom) Paul Jubb	(Czech Republic) Hynek Bartoň (Germany) Leopold Zima (Portugal) Jaime Faria (Morocco) Elliot Benchetrit
November 20	Vale do Lobo, Portugal; Hard; M25; Singles and Doubles Draws	(Czech Republic) David Poljak (Czech Republic) Matěj Vocel; 4–6, 6–3, [11–9]	(Czech Republic) Hynek Bartoň (Czech Republic) Michal Lušovský	(Portugal) Henrique Rocha (United Kingdom) Paul Jubb	(Czech Republic) Hynek Bartoň (Germany) Leopold Zima (Portugal) Jaime Faria (Morocco) Elliot Benchetrit
November 20	Monastir, Tunisia; Hard; M25; Singles and Doubles Draws	(Spain) Alberto Barroso Campos; 7–6^{(7–3)}, 6–7^{(5–7)}, 6–3	(Tunisia) Aziz Dougaz	(Turkey) Yankı Erel (Switzerland) Rémy Bertola	(Netherlands) Jelle Sels (Latvia) Robert Strombachs (Germany) Oscar Otte (Belgium) Buvaysar Gadamauri
November 20	Monastir, Tunisia; Hard; M25; Singles and Doubles Draws	(Germany) Daniel Masur (Italy) Julian Ocleppo; 0–6, 7–5, [10–3]	(Germany) Jakob Schnaitter (Germany) Mark Wallner	(Turkey) Yankı Erel (Switzerland) Rémy Bertola	(Netherlands) Jelle Sels (Latvia) Robert Strombachs (Germany) Oscar Otte (Belgium) Buvaysar Gadamauri
November 20	Mumbai, India; Hard; M25; Singles and Doubles Draws	(India) Ramkumar Ramanathan; 6–0, 6–4	(India) Siddharth Vishwakarma	(United States) Harrison Adams (Germany) Louis Wessels	Evgeny Donskoy (India) Sidharth Rawat (Japan) Ryuki Matsuda (India) S D Prajwal Dev
November 20	Mumbai, India; Hard; M25; Singles and Doubles Draws	(India) Purav Raja (India) Ramkumar Ramanathan; 6–3, 6–3	(United States) Harrison Adams (Ukraine) Vladyslav Orlov	(United States) Harrison Adams (Germany) Louis Wessels	Evgeny Donskoy (India) Sidharth Rawat (Japan) Ryuki Matsuda (India) S D Prajwal Dev
November 20	Brisbane, Australia; Hard; M25; Singles and Doubles Draws	(Japan) Shintaro Imai; 6–4, 7–6^{(7–3)}	(Australia) Blake Ellis	(United Kingdom) Emile Hudd (Australia) Jacob Bradshaw	(Portugal) Gonçalo Oliveira (Australia) Moerani Bouzige (United States) Nick Chappell (Vietnam) Lý Hoàng Nam
November 20	Brisbane, Australia; Hard; M25; Singles and Doubles Draws	(Australia) Thomas Fancutt (New Zealand) Ajeet Rai; 6–4, 6–4	(Australia) Joshua Charlton (United Kingdom) Emile Hudd	(United Kingdom) Emile Hudd (Australia) Jacob Bradshaw	(Portugal) Gonçalo Oliveira (Australia) Moerani Bouzige (United States) Nick Chappell (Vietnam) Lý Hoàng Nam
November 20	Santa Cruz, Bolivia; Clay; M15; Singles and Doubles Draws	(Argentina) Alex Barrena; 6–3, 6–4	(Argentina) Valerio Aboian	(Argentina) Lorenzo Joaquín Rodríguez (Bolivia) Juan Carlos Prado Ángelo	(Uruguay) Franco Roncadelli (Argentina) Ignacio Monzón (Mexico) Alan Fernando Rubio Fierros (Italy) Giuseppe La Vela
November 20	Santa Cruz, Bolivia; Clay; M15; Singles and Doubles Draws	(Argentina) Tomás Farjat (Uruguay) Franco Roncadelli; 3–6, 6–3, [10–8]	(United States) Pranav Kumar (United States) Noah Schachter	(Argentina) Lorenzo Joaquín Rodríguez (Bolivia) Juan Carlos Prado Ángelo	(Uruguay) Franco Roncadelli (Argentina) Ignacio Monzón (Mexico) Alan Fernando Rubio Fierros (Italy) Giuseppe La Vela
November 20	Ipoh Perak, Malaysia; Hard; M15; Singles and Doubles Draws	Alexey Zakharov; 6–0, 6–3	(Japan) Takuya Kumasaka	(Japan) Ryota Tanuma (South Korea) Lee Jea-moon	(South Korea) Lee Duck-hee (Japan) Sora Fukuda (Japan) Hayato Matsuoka (Switzerland) Luca Castelnuovo
November 20	Ipoh Perak, Malaysia; Hard; M15; Singles and Doubles Draws	(Philippines) Francis Alcantara (Indonesia) Christopher Rungkat; 6–2, 6–0	(Netherlands) Thijmen Loof (Thailand) Wishaya Trongcharoenchaikul	(Japan) Ryota Tanuma (South Korea) Lee Jea-moon	(South Korea) Lee Duck-hee (Japan) Sora Fukuda (Japan) Hayato Matsuoka (Switzerland) Luca Castelnuovo
November 20	Sharm El Sheikh, Egypt; Hard; M15; Singles and Doubles Draws	(Ukraine) Vadym Ursu; 6–3, 6–2	Evgeny Philippov	(Czech Republic) Jiří Barnat (Germany) Mats Moraing	(Slovakia) Samuel Puškár (Ukraine) Yurii Dzhavakian (Georgia (country)) Saba Purtseladze; Marat Sharipov
November 20	Sharm El Sheikh, Egypt; Hard; M15; Singles and Doubles Draws	(Slovakia) Tomáš Lánik (Slovakia) Samuel Puškár; 7–6^{(7–4)}, 1–6, [12–10]	(Czech Republic) Jiří Barnat (Czech Republic) Jan Hrazdil	(Czech Republic) Jiří Barnat (Germany) Mats Moraing	(Slovakia) Samuel Puškár (Ukraine) Yurii Dzhavakian (Georgia (country)) Saba Purtseladze; Marat Sharipov
November 20	Heraklion, Greece; Hard; M15; Singles and Doubles Draws	(France) Arthur Géa; 7–6^{(7–2)}, 6–3	(United Kingdom) Alastair Gray	(Croatia) Mili Poljičak (Greece) Ioannis Xilas	(Mexico) Rodrigo Alujas (Luxembourg) Alex Knaff (France) Benjamin Pietri (Israel) Yshai Oliel
November 20	Heraklion, Greece; Hard; M15; Singles and Doubles Draws	(Austria) Neil Oberleitner (Austria) Joel Schwärzler; 7–6^{(7–4)}, 6–2	(Greece) Pavlos Tsitsipas (Greece) Petros Tsitsipas	(Croatia) Mili Poljičak (Greece) Ioannis Xilas	(Mexico) Rodrigo Alujas (Luxembourg) Alex Knaff (France) Benjamin Pietri (Israel) Yshai Oliel
November 20	Alcalá de Henares, Spain; Hard; M15; Singles and Doubles Draws	(Syria) Hazem Naw; 6–4, 6–1	(Spain) Daniel Mérida	(Costa Rica) Jesse Flores (Spain) David Pérez Sanz	(Spain) Pedro Ródenas (United Kingdom) Hamish Stewart (United States) Dali Blanch (Portugal) Duarte Vale
November 20	Alcalá de Henares, Spain; Hard; M15; Singles and Doubles Draws	(United Kingdom) George Houghton (United Kingdom) Hamish Stewart; 6–4, 6–7^{(3–7)}, [14–12]	(Costa Rica) Jesse Flores (New Zealand) Finn Reynolds	(Costa Rica) Jesse Flores (Spain) David Pérez Sanz	(Spain) Pedro Ródenas (United Kingdom) Hamish Stewart (United States) Dali Blanch (Portugal) Duarte Vale
November 20	Limassol, Cyprus; Hard; M15; Singles and Doubles Draws	(Denmark) Elmer Møller; 6–4, 6–3	(Czech Republic) Jakub Nicod	(United Kingdom) Millen Hurrion (Poland) Olaf Pieczkowski	(Sweden) Max Dahlin (Ukraine) Oleg Prihodko (Netherlands) Brian Bozemoj (Austria) Sebastian Sorger
November 20	Limassol, Cyprus; Hard; M15; Singles and Doubles Draws	(Netherlands) Jurriaan Bol (Netherlands) Brian Bozemoj; 4–6, 6–2, [11–9]	(Denmark) Johannes Ingildsen (Denmark) Elmer Møller	(United Kingdom) Millen Hurrion (Poland) Olaf Pieczkowski	(Sweden) Max Dahlin (Ukraine) Oleg Prihodko (Netherlands) Brian Bozemoj (Austria) Sebastian Sorger
November 20	Monastir, Tunisia; Hard; M15; Singles and Doubles Draws	(Belgium) Simon Beaupain; 4–6, 6–3, 7–6^{(7–2)}	(Germany) Christoph Negritu	(Czech Republic) Petr Brunclík (Switzerland) Jakub Paul	(Germany) Florian Broska (Belgium) Romain Faucon (France) Cyril Vandermeersch (France) Louis Tessa
November 20	Monastir, Tunisia; Hard; M15; Singles and Doubles Draws	(Peru) Alexander Merino (Germany) Christoph Negritu; 6–3, 6–1	(Slovakia) Miloš Karol (Germany) Adrian Oetzbach	(Czech Republic) Petr Brunclík (Switzerland) Jakub Paul	(Germany) Florian Broska (Belgium) Romain Faucon (France) Cyril Vandermeersch (France) Louis Tessa
November 27	Monastir, Tunisia; Hard; M25; Singles and Doubles Draws	Bogdan Bobrov; 2–6, 6–4, 7–5	(France) Alexis Gautier	(Netherlands) Guy den Ouden (Italy) Julian Ocleppo	(Tunisia) Aziz Dougaz (Germany) Daniel Masur (Germany) Oscar Otte (Tunisia) Aziz Ouakaa
November 27	Monastir, Tunisia; Hard; M25; Singles and Doubles Draws	(Switzerland) Rémy Bertola (Italy) Giorgio Ricca; 6–3, 6–0	(Croatia) Matej Dodig (Germany) Sebastian Prechtel	(Netherlands) Guy den Ouden (Italy) Julian Ocleppo	(Tunisia) Aziz Dougaz (Germany) Daniel Masur (Germany) Oscar Otte (Tunisia) Aziz Ouakaa
November 27	Heraklion, Greece; Hard; M25; Singles and Doubles Draws	(France) Valentin Royer; 6–3, 7–5	(France) Jules Marie	(Israel) Yshai Oliel (Czech Republic) Marek Gengel	(Austria) Neil Oberleitner (Israel) Orel Kimhi (Greece) Pavlos Tsitsipas (Czech Republic) Jakub Nicod
November 27	Heraklion, Greece; Hard; M25; Singles and Doubles Draws	(Bulgaria) Anthony Genov (Bulgaria) Nikolay Nedelchev; 6–2, 6–1	(Greece) Dimitris Sakellaridis (Greece) Michalis Sakellaridis	(Israel) Yshai Oliel (Czech Republic) Marek Gengel	(Austria) Neil Oberleitner (Israel) Orel Kimhi (Greece) Pavlos Tsitsipas (Czech Republic) Jakub Nicod
November 27	Gold Coast, Australia; Hard; M25; Singles and Doubles Draws	(Japan) Makoto Ochi; 6–4, 6–3	(Australia) Matthew Dellavedova	(Australia) Thomas Fancutt (New Zealand) Ajeet Rai	(United States) Nick Chappell (Australia) Kody Pearson (Australia) Hayden Jones (China) Liu Hanyi
November 27	Gold Coast, Australia; Hard; M25; Singles and Doubles Draws	(Australia) Thomas Fancutt (New Zealand) Ajeet Rai; 7–5, 7–6^{(12–10)}	(Australia) Blake Bayldon (Australia) Kody Pearson	(Australia) Thomas Fancutt (New Zealand) Ajeet Rai	(United States) Nick Chappell (Australia) Kody Pearson (Australia) Hayden Jones (China) Liu Hanyi
November 27	Kalaburagi, India; Hard; M25; Singles and Doubles Draws	(India) Ramkumar Ramanathan; 6–2, 6–1	(Austria) David Pichler	(Japan) Ryotaro Taguchi (Japan) Ryuki Matsuda	(India) Manish Sureshkumar (India) Aryan Shah (Japan) Seita Watanabe (India) Rishab Agarwal
November 27	Kalaburagi, India; Hard; M25; Singles and Doubles Draws	(Japan) Ryuki Matsuda (Japan) Ryotaro Taguchi; 6–4, 2–6, [10–7]	(Austria) David Pichler (India) Nitin Kumar Sinha	(Japan) Ryotaro Taguchi (Japan) Ryuki Matsuda	(India) Manish Sureshkumar (India) Aryan Shah (Japan) Seita Watanabe (India) Rishab Agarwal
November 27	Santa Cruz, Bolivia; Clay; M15; Singles and Doubles Draws	(Bolivia) Juan Carlos Prado Ángelo; 6–3, 7–5	(Brazil) Igor Gimenez	(Argentina) Valerio Aboian (Brazil) Nicolas Zanellato	(Uruguay) Franco Roncadelli (Argentina) Fermín Tenti (Peru) Arklon Huertas del Pino (Argentina) Tomás Farjat
November 27	Santa Cruz, Bolivia; Clay; M15; Singles and Doubles Draws	(Argentina) Tomás Farjat (Peru) Arklon Huertas del Pino; 6–7^{(4–7)}, 6–3, [10–8]	(Argentina) Ignacio Monzón (Argentina) Fermín Tenti	(Argentina) Valerio Aboian (Brazil) Nicolas Zanellato	(Uruguay) Franco Roncadelli (Argentina) Fermín Tenti (Peru) Arklon Huertas del Pino (Argentina) Tomás Farjat
November 27	Sharm El Sheikh, Egypt; Hard; M15; Singles and Doubles Draws	Marat Sharipov; 6–4, 6–4	Evgeny Philippov	(Egypt) Amr Elsayed (Germany) Patrick Zahraj	(Ukraine) Vadym Ursu (Netherlands) Mees Röttgering (Czech Republic) Jan Hrazdil (Chinese Taipei) Meng Cing-yang
November 27	Sharm El Sheikh, Egypt; Hard; M15; Singles and Doubles Draws	(United Kingdom) Ben Jones (United Kingdom) David Stevenson; 7–6^{(7–5)}, 7–6^{(7–2)}	(Kazakhstan) Grigoriy Lomakin; Evgeny Philippov	(Egypt) Amr Elsayed (Germany) Patrick Zahraj	(Ukraine) Vadym Ursu (Netherlands) Mees Röttgering (Czech Republic) Jan Hrazdil (Chinese Taipei) Meng Cing-yang
November 27	Kuala Lumpur, Malaysia; Hard; M15; Singles and Doubles Draws	(South Korea) Jeong Yeong-seok; 1–6, 7–6^{(8–6)}, 6–4	Alexey Zakharov	(Japan) Ryota Tanuma (Japan) Yuta Kawahashi	(Japan) Kokoro Isomura (China) Zhang Changli (Italy) Andrea Bacaloni (Switzerland) Tanguy Genier
November 27	Kuala Lumpur, Malaysia; Hard; M15; Singles and Doubles Draws	(Philippines) Francis Alcantara (Indonesia) Christopher Rungkat; 6–4, 6–2	(Thailand) Pruchya Isaro (Netherlands) Thijmen Loof	(Japan) Ryota Tanuma (Japan) Yuta Kawahashi	(Japan) Kokoro Isomura (China) Zhang Changli (Italy) Andrea Bacaloni (Switzerland) Tanguy Genier
November 27	Limassol, Cyprus; Hard; M15; Singles and Doubles Draws	(Italy) Lorenzo Bocchi; 4–6, 7–5, 6–4	(United Kingdom) Millen Hurrion	(Austria) Sebastian Sorger (Netherlands) Daniel de Jonge	(Romania) Sebastian Gima (Ukraine) Oleg Prihodko (Greece) Demetris Azoides (Sweden) Max Dahlin
November 27	Limassol, Cyprus; Hard; M15; Singles and Doubles Draws	(Cyprus) Menelaos Efstathiou (Cyprus) Eleftherios Neos; 3–6, 6–0, [10–5]	(Cyprus) Petros Chrysochos (Cyprus) Sergis Kyratzis	(Austria) Sebastian Sorger (Netherlands) Daniel de Jonge	(Romania) Sebastian Gima (Ukraine) Oleg Prihodko (Greece) Demetris Azoides (Sweden) Max Dahlin
November 27	Zahra, Kuwait; Hard; M15; Singles and Doubles Draws	(Turkey) Yankı Erel; 6–3, 6–2	(Netherlands) Sidané Pontjodikromo	(Luxembourg) Alex Knaff (United Kingdom) Giles Hussey	(Bulgaria) Petr Nesterov (Georgia (country)) Zura Tkemaladze (Netherlands) Elgin Khoeblal (Netherlands) Sander Jong
November 27	Zahra, Kuwait; Hard; M15; Singles and Doubles Draws	(Netherlands) Guy den Heijer (Netherlands) Sidané Pontjodikromo; 6–3, 6–7^{(1–7)}, [10–7]	(Georgia (country)) Aleksandre Bakshi (Georgia (country)) Zura Tkemaladze	(Luxembourg) Alex Knaff (United Kingdom) Giles Hussey	(Bulgaria) Petr Nesterov (Georgia (country)) Zura Tkemaladze (Netherlands) Elgin Khoeblal (Netherlands) Sander Jong
November 27	San Gregorio di Catania, Italy; Clay; M15; Singles and Doubles Draws	(Spain) Pol Martín Tiffon; 6–2, 6–2	(Italy) Gabriele Piraino	(Italy) Salvatore Caruso (Italy) Gabriele Pennaforti	(Italy) Gabriele Maria Noce (Italy) Filippo Romano (Italy) Stefano Reitano (France) Rayane Oumaouche
November 27	San Gregorio di Catania, Italy; Clay; M15; Singles and Doubles Draws	(Italy) Gabriele Maria Noce (Italy) Augusto Virgili; 6–4, 6–4	(Italy) Matteo De Vincentis (Italy) Elio José Ribeiro Lago	(Italy) Salvatore Caruso (Italy) Gabriele Pennaforti	(Italy) Gabriele Maria Noce (Italy) Filippo Romano (Italy) Stefano Reitano (France) Rayane Oumaouche
November 27	Madrid, Spain; Hard; M15; Singles and Doubles Draws	(United Kingdom) Alastair Gray; 6–1, 6–7^{(5–7)}, 6–2	(Syria) Hazem Naw	(Finland) Eero Vasa (Spain) Alejo Sánchez Quílez	(Spain) David Pérez Sanz (United States) Dali Blanch (Spain) John Echeverría (United Kingdom) George Houghton
November 27	Madrid, Spain; Hard; M15; Singles and Doubles Draws	(Spain) Miguel Avendaño Cadena (Spain) Luis Llorens Saracho; 6–1, 6–3	(United States) AJ Catanzariti (New Zealand) Finn Reynolds	(Finland) Eero Vasa (Spain) Alejo Sánchez Quílez	(Spain) David Pérez Sanz (United States) Dali Blanch (Spain) John Echeverría (United Kingdom) George Houghton
November 27	Antalya, Turkey; Clay; M15; Singles and Doubles Draws	(Serbia) Stefan Popović; 2–6, 6–3, 6–2	Maxim Zhukov	(Romania) Călin Manda (Moldova) Ilya Snițari	(Italy) Samuele Pieri (Turkey) Mert Alkaya; Evgenii Tiurnev (Uzbekistan) Sergey Fomin
November 27	Antalya, Turkey; Clay; M15; Singles and Doubles Draws	(Romania) Vlad Andrei Dumitru (Romania) Ștefan Paloși; 7–6^{(7–4)}, 5–7, [10–3]	(Turkey) Cengiz Aksu (Turkey) Gökberk Sarıtaş	(Romania) Călin Manda (Moldova) Ilya Snițari	(Italy) Samuele Pieri (Turkey) Mert Alkaya; Evgenii Tiurnev (Uzbekistan) Sergey Fomin
November 27	Monastir, Tunisia; Hard; M15; Singles and Doubles Draws	(Switzerland) Jakub Paul; 6–2, 6–3	(France) Étienne Donnet	(Romania) Cezar Crețu (Netherlands) Thiemo de Bakker	(Germany) Christoph Negritu (Czech Republic) Petr Brunclík (Germany) Florian Broska (Slovakia) Miloš Karol
November 27	Monastir, Tunisia; Hard; M15; Singles and Doubles Draws	(Germany) Christoph Negritu (Switzerland) Jakub Paul; 5–0, ret.	(Netherlands) Thiemo de Bakker (Netherlands) Ronetto van Tilburg	(Romania) Cezar Crețu (Netherlands) Thiemo de Bakker	(Germany) Christoph Negritu (Czech Republic) Petr Brunclík (Germany) Florian Broska (Slovakia) Miloš Karol

=== December ===
Week of	Tournament	Winner	Runners-up	Semifinalists	Quarterfinalists
December 4	Sharm El Sheikh, Egypt; Hard; M15; Singles and Doubles Draws	(Italy) Samuel Vincent Ruggeri; 6–4, 7–6^{(7–2)}	(Georgia (country)) Saba Purtseladze	(Ukraine) Yurii Dzhavakian (Ukraine) Vadym Ursu	(Germany) Max Wiskandt (United Kingdom) Millen Hurrion (Italy) Alexandr Binda (Netherlands) Mees Röttgering
December 4	Sharm El Sheikh, Egypt; Hard; M15; Singles and Doubles Draws	(Kazakhstan) Grigoriy Lomakin (Ukraine) Vadym Ursu; 6–2, 4–6, [10–5]	(Italy) Filiberto Fumagalli (Italy) Samuel Vincent Ruggeri	(Ukraine) Yurii Dzhavakian (Ukraine) Vadym Ursu	(Germany) Max Wiskandt (United Kingdom) Millen Hurrion (Italy) Alexandr Binda (Netherlands) Mees Röttgering
December 4	Madrid, Spain; Clay; M15; Singles and Doubles Draws	(Argentina) Marco Trungelliti; 6–4, 6–2	(Spain) Pol Martín Tiffon	(Argentina) Julio César Porras (Netherlands) Ryan Nijboer	(Spain) John Echeverría (Ukraine) Georgii Kravchenko (Spain) Sergi Pérez Contri (Spain) Albert Pedrico Kravtsov
December 4	Madrid, Spain; Clay; M15; Singles and Doubles Draws	(Netherlands) Michiel de Krom (Netherlands) Ryan Nijboer; 4–6, 6–1, [10–8]	(Spain) David Pérez Sanz (Spain) Ricardo Villacorta	(Argentina) Julio César Porras (Netherlands) Ryan Nijboer	(Spain) John Echeverría (Ukraine) Georgii Kravchenko (Spain) Sergi Pérez Contri (Spain) Albert Pedrico Kravtsov
December 4	Antalya, Turkey; Clay; M15; Singles and Doubles Draws	(Kazakhstan) Dmitry Popko; 6–4, 3–6, 6–2	(Uzbekistan) Sergey Fomin	(United Kingdom) Jay Clarke; Evgenii Tiurnev	(Romania) Filip Cristian Jianu (France) Émilien Voisin (Romania) Călin Manda; Denis Klok
December 4	Antalya, Turkey; Clay; M15; Singles and Doubles Draws	(United Kingdom) Jay Clarke (United Kingdom) James MacKinlay; 7–6^{(7–5)}, 7–5	(Turkey) Sarp Ağabigün (France) Corentin Denolly	(United Kingdom) Jay Clarke; Evgenii Tiurnev	(Romania) Filip Cristian Jianu (France) Émilien Voisin (Romania) Călin Manda; Denis Klok
December 4	Zahra, Kuwait; Hard; M15; Singles and Doubles Draws	(France) Jules Marie; 6–2, 6–1	(Netherlands) Elgin Khoeblal	(Switzerland) Rémy Bertola (United Kingdom) Giles Hussey	(Luxembourg) Alex Knaff (Bulgaria) Petr Nesterov (Netherlands) Sidané Pontjodikromo (Germany) Adrian Oetzbach
December 4	Zahra, Kuwait; Hard; M15; Singles and Doubles Draws	(Netherlands) Dax Donders (Netherlands) Sidané Pontjodikromo; 3–6, 7–6^{(7–3)}, [10–8]	(Georgia (country)) Aleksandre Bakshi (Bulgaria) Petr Nesterov	(Switzerland) Rémy Bertola (United Kingdom) Giles Hussey	(Luxembourg) Alex Knaff (Bulgaria) Petr Nesterov (Netherlands) Sidané Pontjodikromo (Germany) Adrian Oetzbach
December 4	Concepción, Chile; Clay; M15; Singles and Doubles Draws	(Argentina) Facundo Mena; 7–6^{(7–4)}, 6–1	(Argentina) Nicolás Kicker	(Argentina) Lautaro Midón (Argentina) Valerio Aboian	(Argentina) Gonzalo Villanueva (Argentina) Lorenzo Joaquín Rodríguez (Argentina) Juan Manuel La Serna (Chile) Diego Fernández Flores
December 4	Concepción, Chile; Clay; M15; Singles and Doubles Draws	(Argentina) Juan Pablo Paz (Argentina) Gonzalo Villanueva; 6–1, 6–3	(Argentina) Lautaro Midón (Brazil) João Victor Couto Loureiro	(Argentina) Lautaro Midón (Argentina) Valerio Aboian	(Argentina) Gonzalo Villanueva (Argentina) Lorenzo Joaquín Rodríguez (Argentina) Juan Manuel La Serna (Chile) Diego Fernández Flores
December 4	Monastir, Tunisia; Hard; M15; Singles and Doubles Draws	(Netherlands) Guy den Ouden; 6–3, 6–2	(Switzerland) Jakub Paul	Kirill Kivattsev (United Kingdom) Paul Jubb	(United States) Omni Kumar (United States) Adit Sinha (France) Robin Bertrand (Germany) Mark Wallner
December 4	Monastir, Tunisia; Hard; M15; Singles and Doubles Draws	(Germany) Florian Broska (Greece) Dimitris Sakellaridis; 6–4, 5–7, [10–7]	(France) Étienne Donnet (France) Fabien Salle	Kirill Kivattsev (United Kingdom) Paul Jubb	(United States) Omni Kumar (United States) Adit Sinha (France) Robin Bertrand (Germany) Mark Wallner
December 11	Sharm El Sheikh, Egypt; Hard; M15; Singles and Doubles Draws	(Italy) Samuel Vincent Ruggeri; 6–3, 6–3	Evgeny Philippov	(Ukraine) Vadym Ursu (South Africa) Alec Beckley	Saveliy Ivanov (Slovenia) Bor Artnak (Kazakhstan) Grigoriy Lomakin; Aristarkh Safonov
December 11	Sharm El Sheikh, Egypt; Hard; M15; Singles and Doubles Draws	(Italy) Filiberto Fumagalli (Italy) Samuel Vincent Ruggeri; 6–4, 7–6^{(7–2)}	(Germany) Rostislav Halfinger (Italy) Augusto Virgili	(Ukraine) Vadym Ursu (South Africa) Alec Beckley	Saveliy Ivanov (Slovenia) Bor Artnak (Kazakhstan) Grigoriy Lomakin; Aristarkh Safonov
December 11	Wellington, New Zealand; Hard; M15; Singles and Doubles Draws	(Australia) Matthew Dellavedova; 2–6, 6–2, 6–1	(United States) Matt Kuhar	(Australia) Jacob Bradshaw (Australia) Jayden Court	(New Zealand) George Stoupe (United Kingdom) Emile Hudd (France) Samuel Brosset (New Zealand) Corban Crowther
December 11	Wellington, New Zealand; Hard; M15; Singles and Doubles Draws	(New Zealand) Marcus Daniell (New Zealand) Finn Reynolds; 6–4, 6–2	(Australia) Joshua Charlton (United Kingdom) Emile Hudd	(Australia) Jacob Bradshaw (Australia) Jayden Court	(New Zealand) George Stoupe (United Kingdom) Emile Hudd (France) Samuel Brosset (New Zealand) Corban Crowther
December 11	Antalya, Turkey; Clay; M15; Singles and Doubles Draws	Evgenii Tiurnev; 7–6^{(7–4)}, 5–7, 6–1	(France) Corentin Denolly	(Argentina) Ezequiel Monferrer (France) Émilien Voisin	(Turkey) Arda Azkara; Denis Klok; Bogdan Bobrov (United Kingdom) Jay Clarke
December 11	Antalya, Turkey; Clay; M15; Singles and Doubles Draws	(United Kingdom) Jay Clarke (United Kingdom) James MacKinlay; 6–1, 6–2	Bogdan Bobrov (Bulgaria) Petr Nesterov	(Argentina) Ezequiel Monferrer (France) Émilien Voisin	(Turkey) Arda Azkara; Denis Klok; Bogdan Bobrov (United Kingdom) Jay Clarke
December 11	Zahra, Kuwait; Hard; M15; Singles and Doubles Draws	(United Kingdom) Alastair Gray vs (Belgium) Émilien Demanet; Cancelled after the death of Emir Nawaf Al-Ahmad Al-Jaber Al-Sabah		(Georgia (country)) Aleksandre Bakshi (Netherlands) Sidané Pontjodikromo	(Georgia (country)) Zura Tkemaladze (France) Arthur Bonnaud (Netherlands) Deney Wassermann (Luxembourg) Alex Knaff
December 11	Zahra, Kuwait; Hard; M15; Singles and Doubles Draws	(Georgia (country)) Aleksandre Bakshi / (Georgia (country)) Zura Tkemaladze vs (Ukraine) Aleksandr Braynin / (Ukraine) Mykyta Riepkin; Cancelled after the death of Emir Nawaf Al-Ahmad Al-Jaber Al-Sabah		(Georgia (country)) Aleksandre Bakshi (Netherlands) Sidané Pontjodikromo	(Georgia (country)) Zura Tkemaladze (France) Arthur Bonnaud (Netherlands) Deney Wassermann (Luxembourg) Alex Knaff
December 11	Concepción, Chile; Clay; M15; Singles and Doubles Draws	(Argentina) Gonzalo Villanueva; 6–3, 6–4	(Argentina) Facundo Mena	(Chile) Ignacio Antonio Becerra Otarola (Argentina) Valerio Aboian	(Chile) Diego Fernández Flores (Italy) Luciano Carraro (Argentina) Lautaro Midón (Chile) Matías Soto
December 11	Concepción, Chile; Clay; M15; Singles and Doubles Draws	(Argentina) Juan Pablo Paz (Argentina) Gonzalo Villanueva; 6–4, 5–7, [10–5]	(Brazil) Luís Britto (Brazil) Paulo André Saraiva dos Santos	(Chile) Ignacio Antonio Becerra Otarola (Argentina) Valerio Aboian	(Chile) Diego Fernández Flores (Italy) Luciano Carraro (Argentina) Lautaro Midón (Chile) Matías Soto
December 11	Ceuta, Spain; Hard; M15; Singles and Doubles Draws	(United Kingdom) Paul Jubb; 6–1, 6–2	(Spain) Diego Augusto Barreto Sánchez	(Spain) Mario González Fernández (Spain) John Echeverría	(Spain) Pol Martín Tiffon (Spain) Alejo Sánchez Quílez (Ukraine) Volodymyr Iakubenko (Spain) David Pérez Sanz
December 11	Ceuta, Spain; Hard; M15; Singles and Doubles Draws	(Spain) Alejo Sánchez Quílez (Bulgaria) Leonid Sheyngezikht; 6–7^{(3–7)}, 7–5, [15–13]	(Spain) John Echeverría (United Kingdom) Mark Whitehouse	(Spain) Mario González Fernández (Spain) John Echeverría	(Spain) Pol Martín Tiffon (Spain) Alejo Sánchez Quílez (Ukraine) Volodymyr Iakubenko (Spain) David Pérez Sanz
December 11	Monastir, Tunisia; Hard; M15; Singles and Doubles Draws	(United States) Omni Kumar; 6–1, 6–1	(Germany) Christoph Negritu	(Netherlands) Niels Visker (United States) Michael Zhu	(France) Fabien Salle (France) Arthur Bouquier (France) Robin Bertrand (Morocco) Yassine Dlimi
December 11	Monastir, Tunisia; Hard; M15; Singles and Doubles Draws	(Bulgaria) Alexander Donski (Portugal) Tiago Pereira; 6–2, 2–1, ret.	(Germany) Christoph Negritu (United States) Michael Zhu	(Netherlands) Niels Visker (United States) Michael Zhu	(France) Fabien Salle (France) Arthur Bouquier (France) Robin Bertrand (Morocco) Yassine Dlimi
December 18	Yanagawa, Japan; Hard; M15; Singles and Doubles Draws	(Japan) Hikaru Shiraishi; 6–3, 2–6, 6–1	(Japan) Taisei Ichikawa	(South Korea) Shin San-hui (Japan) Masamichi Imamura	(Japan) Kazuma Kawachi (Japan) Takuya Kumasaka (Japan) Jumpei Yamasaki (Japan) Seita Watanabe
December 18	Yanagawa, Japan; Hard; M15; Singles and Doubles Draws	(Japan) Kokoro Isomura (Japan) Yamato Sueoka; 7–6^{(7–4)}, 7–5	(Japan) Jay Dylan Hara Friend (Japan) Kenta Miyoshi	(South Korea) Shin San-hui (Japan) Masamichi Imamura	(Japan) Kazuma Kawachi (Japan) Takuya Kumasaka (Japan) Jumpei Yamasaki (Japan) Seita Watanabe
December 18	Papamoa, New Zealand; Hard; M15; Singles and Doubles Draws	(Australia) Matthew Dellavedova; 7–6^{(7–4)}, 6–2	(Australia) Jacob Bradshaw	(New Zealand) Jack Loutit (New Zealand) Corban Crowther	(New Zealand) Isaac Becroft (Australia) Moerani Bouzige (United States) Harrison Adams (New Zealand) Anton Shepp
December 18	Papamoa, New Zealand; Hard; M15; Singles and Doubles Draws	(New Zealand) Marcus Daniell (New Zealand) Finn Reynolds; 7–5, 6–4	(New Zealand) Reece Falck (New Zealand) George Stoupe	(New Zealand) Jack Loutit (New Zealand) Corban Crowther	(New Zealand) Isaac Becroft (Australia) Moerani Bouzige (United States) Harrison Adams (New Zealand) Anton Shepp
December 18	Antalya, Turkey; Clay; M15; Singles and Doubles Draws	(Kazakhstan) Dmitry Popko; 6–4, 7–5	(Spain) Max Alcalá Gurri	Evgenii Tiurnev (Italy) Samuele Pieri	(Uzbekistan) Sergey Fomin (Moldova) Ilya Snițari (France) Corentin Denolly (Italy) Federico Campana
December 18	Antalya, Turkey; Clay; M15; Singles and Doubles Draws	(Italy) Niccolò Catini (Italy) Samuele Pieri; 6–2, 2–6, [10–7]	Daniil Golubev; Evgenii Tiurnev	Evgenii Tiurnev (Italy) Samuele Pieri	(Uzbekistan) Sergey Fomin (Moldova) Ilya Snițari (France) Corentin Denolly (Italy) Federico Campana
December 18	Monastir, Tunisia; Hard; M15; Singles and Doubles Draws	(United States) Omni Kumar; 6–4, 7–5	(Moldova) Alexandr Cozbinov	(Netherlands) Jelle Sels (Italy) Mariano Tammaro	(Bulgaria) Alexander Donski (France) Constantin Bittoun Kouzmine (United States) Perry Gregg (Greece) Stefanos Sakellaridis
December 18	Monastir, Tunisia; Hard; M15; Singles and Doubles Draws	(Bulgaria) Alexander Donski (China) Mu Tao; 6–0, 3–6, [12–10]	Igor Kudriashov; Aleksandr Lobanov	(Netherlands) Jelle Sels (Italy) Mariano Tammaro	(Bulgaria) Alexander Donski (France) Constantin Bittoun Kouzmine (United States) Perry Gregg (Greece) Stefanos Sakellaridis
December 25	Yanagawa, Japan; Hard; M15; Singles and Doubles Draws	(South Korea) Shin San-hui; 6–3, 6–4	(South Korea) Lee Duck-hee	(Japan) Jumpei Yamasaki (Japan) Jay Dylan Hara Friend	(Japan) Keisuke Saitoh (Japan) Takuya Kumasaka (Japan) Taisei Ichikawa (Japan) Hayato Matsuoka
December 25	Yanagawa, Japan; Hard; M15; Singles and Doubles Draws	(Japan) Sho Katayama (Japan) Shunsuke Nakagawa; 6–2, 6–3	(Japan) Kazuma Kawachi (Japan) Yamato Sueoka	(Japan) Jumpei Yamasaki (Japan) Jay Dylan Hara Friend	(Japan) Keisuke Saitoh (Japan) Takuya Kumasaka (Japan) Taisei Ichikawa (Japan) Hayato Matsuoka
December 25	Monastir, Tunisia; Hard; M15; Singles and Doubles Draws	(United Kingdom) Oliver Tarvet; 4–6, 6–3, 6–1	(Japan) Ryotaro Taguchi	(United States) Omni Kumar (France) Florent Bax	(Ukraine) Vladyslav Orlov; Igor Kudriashov; Ilia Simakin; Artur Kukasian
December 25	Monastir, Tunisia; Hard; M15; Singles and Doubles Draws	(Japan) Ryuki Matsuda (Japan) Ryotaro Taguchi; 6–3, 6–4	Igor Kudriashov; Aleksandr Lobanov	(United States) Omni Kumar (France) Florent Bax	(Ukraine) Vladyslav Orlov; Igor Kudriashov; Ilia Simakin; Artur Kukasian
