= 2025 Athens Challenger – Singles =

Singles
- 2025 Athens Challenger

Final
- Champion: (Belgium) Michael Geerts
- Runner-up: (United Kingdom) Arthur Fery
- Score: 7–5, 4–6, 6–2

Events
Singles	Doubles
- Athens Challenger

This was the first edition of the tournament.

Michael Geerts won the title after defeating Arthur Fery 7–5, 4–6, 6–2 in the final.

== Seeds ==
1. (United Kingdom) Arthur Fery (final)
2. (Austria) Sandro Kopp (semifinals)
3. (United Kingdom) Harry Wendelken (first round)
4. (United Kingdom) Giles Hussey (first round)
5. (Ivory Coast) Eliakim Coulibaly (quarterfinals)
6. (Italy) Luca Potenza (first round)
7. (South Africa) Philip Henning (quarterfinals)
8. (Germany) Diego Dedura (first round)

== Draw ==
Key

- Q = Qualifier
- WC = Wild card
- LL = Lucky loser
- Alt = Alternate
- ITF = ITF entry
- PR = Protected ranking
- SR = Special ranking
- SE = Special exempt
- JE = Junior exempt
- JR = Junior Accelerator Programme entrant
- CO = College Accelerator Programme entrant
- NG = Next Gen Accelerator Program entrant
- w/o = Walkover
- r = Retired
- d = Defaulted

=== Finals ===
Semifinals
1	(United Kingdom) Arthur Fery	4	6	6
Q	(Spain) Alberto Barroso Campos	6	4	2
(Belgium) Michael Geerts	6	6
2	(Austria) Sandro Kopp	3	2

Final
1	(United Kingdom) Arthur Fery	5	6	2
(Belgium) Michael Geerts	7	4	6

=== Top half ===
First round
1	(United Kingdom) A Fery	1	6	6
(Greece) A Thanos	6	4	4
Alt	(Hungary) Péter Fajta	1	7^{10}	4
(Germany) R Molleker	6	6^{8}	6
WC	(Greece) D Sakellaridis	3	3
(Italy) E Dalla Valle	6	6
Q	(United Kingdom) Charlie Robertson	4	2
5	(Ivory Coast) E Coulibaly	6	6
3	(United Kingdom) H Wendelken	6	1	2
WC	(Cyprus) M Efstathiou	4	6	6
Alt	(Spain) Sergio Callejón Hernando	6	6
(Sweden) O Wallin	2	2
Q	(Spain) A Barroso Campos	6	6
WC	(Greece) Pa Tsitsipas	1	3
(Italy) M Ribecai	4	6	6
8	(Germany) D Dedura	6	3	3

Second round
1	(United Kingdom) A Fery	4
(Germany) R Molleker	0^{r}
(Italy) E Dalla Valle	1	5
5	(Ivory Coast) E Coulibaly	6	7
WC	(Cyprus) M Efstathiou	2	6	3
Alt	(Spain) S Callejón Hernando	6	3	6
Q	(Spain) A Barroso Campos	6	3	6
(Italy) M Ribecai	1	6	1

Quarterfinals
1	(United Kingdom) A Fery	6	6
5	(Ivory Coast) E Coulibaly	3	3
Alt	(Spain) S Callejón Hernando	0	6	3^{r}
Q	(Spain) A Barroso Campos	6	4	4

Semifinals
1	(United Kingdom) A Fery	4	6	6
Q	(Spain) A Barroso Campos	6	4	2

=== Bottom half ===
First round
6	(Italy) Luca Potenza	6^{5}	5
Q	(Ukraine) Aleksandr Braynin	7^{7}	7
Nikolay Vylegzhanin	6	6
Q	(Italy) Lorenzo Angelini	2	2
Q	(Czech Republic) J Kumstát	7	4	6
Alt	(Poland) M Kaśnikowski	5	6	1
(Belgium) M Geerts	6	6
4	(United Kingdom) G Hussey	2	1
7	(South Africa) P Henning	6	1
Q	(Italy) Pierluigi Basile	2	0^{r}
(Italy) CA Caniato	2	3
(United Kingdom) James Story	6	6
(Ukraine) O Prihodko	2	6	6
(Spain) B Zapata Miralles	6	2	0
JR	(Romania) L Preda	5	0^{r}
2	(Austria) S Kopp	7	1

Second round
Q	(Ukraine) A Braynin	4	2
N Vylegzhanin	6	6
Q	(Czech Republic) J Kumstát	6^{2}	1
(Belgium) M Geerts	7^{7}	6
7	(South Africa) P Henning	7^{7}	6
(United Kingdom) J Story	6^{1}	3
(Ukraine) O Prihodko	0	1
2	(Austria) S Kopp	6	6

Quarterfinals
N Vylegzhanin	2	4
(Belgium) M Geerts	6	6
7	(South Africa) P Henning	0	7	3
2	(Austria) S Kopp	6	5	6

Semifinals
(Belgium) M Geerts	6	6
2	(Austria) S Kopp	3	2
