= 2025 Athens Challenger =

- Date: 24 – 30 November
- Edition: 1st
- Surface: Hard
- Location: Athens, Greece

Champions

Singles
- (Belgium) Michael Geerts

Doubles
- (Spain) Alberto Barroso Campos / (Belgium) Michael Geerts
- Athens Challenger

The 2025 I.T.C. Athens Challenger was a professional tennis tournament played on hardcourts. It was the first edition of the tournament which was part of the 2025 ATP Challenger Tour. It took place in Athens, Greece between 24 and 30 November 2025.

== Singles main-draw entrants ==
=== Seeds ===
Country	Player	Rank^{1}	Seed
GBR	Arthur Fery	198	1
AUT	Sandro Kopp	314	2
GBR	Harry Wendelken	325	3
GBR	Giles Hussey	334	4
CIV	Eliakim Coulibaly	336	5
ITA	Luca Potenza	362	6
RSA	Philip Henning	363	7
GER	Diego Dedura	364	8

- ^{1} Rankings are as of 17 November 2025.

=== Other entrants ===
The following players received wildcards into the singles main draw:

- (Cyprus) Menelaos Efstathiou
- (Greece) Dimitris Sakellaridis
- (Greece) Pavlos Tsitsipas

The following player received entry into the singles main draw through the Junior Accelerator programme:

- (Romania) Luca Preda

The following players received entry into the singles main draw as alternates:

- (Spain) Sergio Callejón Hernando
- (Hungary) Péter Fajta
- (Poland) Maks Kaśnikowski

The following players received entry from the qualifying draw:

- (Italy) Lorenzo Angelini
- (Spain) Alberto Barroso Campos
- (Italy) Pierluigi Basile
- (Ukraine) Aleksandr Braynin
- (Czech Republic) Jan Kumstát
- (United Kingdom) Charlie Robertson

== Champions ==
=== Singles ===
- (Belgium) Michael Geerts def. (United Kingdom) Arthur Fery 7–5, 4–6, 6–2.

=== Doubles ===
- (Spain) Alberto Barroso Campos / (Belgium) Michael Geerts def. (Switzerland) Andrin Casanova / (Switzerland) Nicolás Parizzia 6–3, 3–6, [10–6].
