= Alex Knaff =

Luxembourgish tennis player

- Country (sports): Luxembourg
- Born: 26 November 1997 (age 28) Luxembourg City, Luxembourg
- Height: 1.93 m (6 ft 4 in)
- Plays: Right-handed (two-handed backhand)
- College: Florida State
- Coach: Gilles Müller
- Prize money: US $81,288

Singles
- Career record: 9–7 (at ATP Tour level, Grand Slam level, and in Davis Cup)
- Career titles: 0; 0 Challenger, 2 Futures
- Highest ranking: No. 486 (11 September 2023)
- Current ranking: No. 761 (14 September 2026)

Doubles
- Career record: 3–3 (at ATP Tour level, Grand Slam level, and in Davis Cup)
- Career titles: 0; 0 Challenger, 7 Futures
- Highest ranking: No. 364 (11 September 2023)
- Current ranking: No. 1,489 (14 September 2026)
- Last updated on: 18 September 2026.

Alex Knaff (born 26 November 1997) is a Luxembourgish tennis player. He has a career high ATP singles ranking of No. 486 achieved on 11 September 2023 and a career high ATP doubles ranking of No. 364 achieved on 11 September 2023.

== Tennis career ==
Knaff played college tennis at Florida State University.

Knaff won his first ITF title in his college town in 2022. He represented Luxembourg at the Davis Cup since 2015, where he has a W/L record of 12–10.

== Future and Challenger finals ==
=== Singles 4 (3-3) ===
Legend (singles) ITF Futures Tour (3-3)	Titles by surface Hard (2–3) Clay (1–0) Grass (0–0) Carpet (0–0)

Result	W–L	Date	Tournament	Tier	Surface	Opponent	Score
Loss	0–1	May 2022	Mexico M15, Cancun	World Tennis Tour	Hard	(United States) Brandon Holt	1–6, 2–6
Win	1–1	Oct 2022	(United States) USA M15, Tallahassee	World Tennis Tour	Hard	(United States) William Grant	6–3, 6–0
Win	2–1	July 2023	Luxembourg M25, Esch-sur-Alzette	World Tennis Tour	Clay	(Germany) Marlon Vankan	6–3, 6–1
Loss	2–2	October 2023	Egypt M15, Sharm El Sheikh	World Tennis Tour	Hard	(Egypt) Mohamed Safwat	4–6, 4–6
Win	3–2	March 2025	Thailand M15, Nonthaburi	World Tennis Tour	Hard	(Russia) Petr Bar Biryukov	6-1, 7-6^{(7–3)}
Loss	3-3	March 2025	Thailand M15, Nonthaburi	World Tennis Tour	Hard	(France) Etienne Donnet	4–6, 2–6

=== Doubles 14 (7–7) ===
Legend (doubles) ITF Futures Tour (7–6)	Titles by surface Hard (2–5) Clay (4–1) Grass (0–0) Carpet (0–0)

Result	W–L	Date	Tournament	Tier	Surface	Partner	Opponents	Score
Loss	0–1	Nov 2021	United States M15, Ithaca	World Tennis Tour	Hard	(Canada) Joshua Peck	(United States) Vasil Kirkov (United Kingdom) Luke Johnson	6–7^{(3–7)}, 3–6
Loss	0–2	Mar 2022	Tunisia M15, Monastir	World Tennis Tour	Hard	(Tunisia) Aziz Dougaz	(China) Hanwen Li (Argentina) Mateo Nicolas Martinez	1–6, 6–2, 8–10
Win	1–2	Mar 2022	Tunisia M15, Monastir	World Tennis Tour	Hard	(Tunisia) Aziz Dougaz	(Japan) Tomohiro Masabayashi (Japan) Ren Nakamura	6–2, 6–4
Loss	1-3	Apr 2022	United States M15, Sunrise	World Tennis Tour	Clay	(Netherlands) Alec Deckers	(Moldova) Alexander Cozbinov (South Africa) Ruan Roelofse	4–6, 4–6
Win	2-3	Jun 2022	Belgium M15, Duffel	World Tennis Tour	Clay	(Luxembourg) Chris Rodesch	(Argentina) Franco Emanuel Egea (Brazil) Marcelo Zormann	6–1, 6–4
Win	3-3	Jul 2022	Luxembourg M25, Esch-sur-Alzette	World Tennis Tour	Clay	(Luxembourg) Chris Rodesch	(Luxembourg) Raphael Calzi (Germany) Marlon Vankan	6–1, 6–4
Win	4-3	Jan 2023	(Spain) Manacor M25, Manacor	World Tennis Tour	Hard	(Sweden) Filip Bergevi	(Spain) Alberto Barroso Campos (Spain) Imanol López Morillo	3–6, 6–3, 16–14
Loss	4-4	Mar 2023	(Egypt) Sharm El Sheikh M15, Sharm El Sheikh	World Tennis Tour	Hard	(Germany) Jakob Schnaitter	(Slovakia) Lukáš Pokorný (Georgia (country)) Saba Purtseladze	3–4, 4–6
Loss	4-5	Mar 2023	(Egypt) Sharm El Sheikh M15, Sharm El Sheikh	World Tennis Tour	Hard	(Germany) Jakob Schnaitter	(South Africa) Alec Beckley (Bulgaria) Petr Nesterov	6-3, 3–6, 8–10
Win	5-5	May 2023	(Bulgaria) Pazardzhik M15, Pazardzhik	World Tennis Tour	Clay	(France) Corentin Denolly	(Italy) Riccardo Balzerani (Russia) Artsiom Sinitsyn	6-0, 6–0
Win	6-5	July 2023	Luxembourg M25, Esch-sur-Alzette	World Tennis Tour	Clay	(Luxembourg) Chris Rodesch	(Greece) Dimitris Sakellaridis (Greece) Stefanos Sakellaridis	6-3, 6–4
Win	7-5	July 2023	Luxembourg M25, Esch-sur-Alzette	World Tennis Tour	Clay	(Austria) David Pichler	(Greece) Dimitris Sakellaridis (Greece) Stefanos Sakellaridis	1-6, 6–1, 12–10
Loss	7-6	Feb 2024	(Spain) Villena M15, Villena	World Tennis Tour	Hard	(Colombia) Adrià Soriano Barrera	(Germany) Liam Gavrielides (Spain) Alejo Sanchez Quilez	2-6, 4–6
Loss	7-7	Mar 2024	(Spain) Torello M15, Torello	World Tennis Tour	Hard	(Germany) Niklas Schell	(United Kingdom) James Davis (United Kingdom) Giles Hussey	1-6, 2–6
