= Athens Challenger =

- 2025 Athens Challenger

ATP Challenger Tour
- Location: Athens, Greece
- Venue: OAKA Stadion Sports Center
- Category: ATP Challenger Tour
- Surface: Hard
- Prize money: €54,000

The I.T.C. Athens Challenger is a professional tennis tournament played on hardcourts. It is currently part of the ATP Challenger Tour. It was first held in Athens, Greece in 2025.

== Past finals ==
=== Singles ===
Year	Champion	Runner-up	Score
2025	(Belgium) Michael Geerts	(United Kingdom) Arthur Fery	7–5, 4–6, 6–2

=== Doubles ===
Year	Champions	Runners-up	Score
2025	(Spain) Alberto Barroso Campos (Belgium) Michael Geerts	(Switzerland) Andrin Casanova (Switzerland) Nicolás Parizzia	6–3, 3–6, [10–6]
