= Michael Geerts =

Belgian tennis player

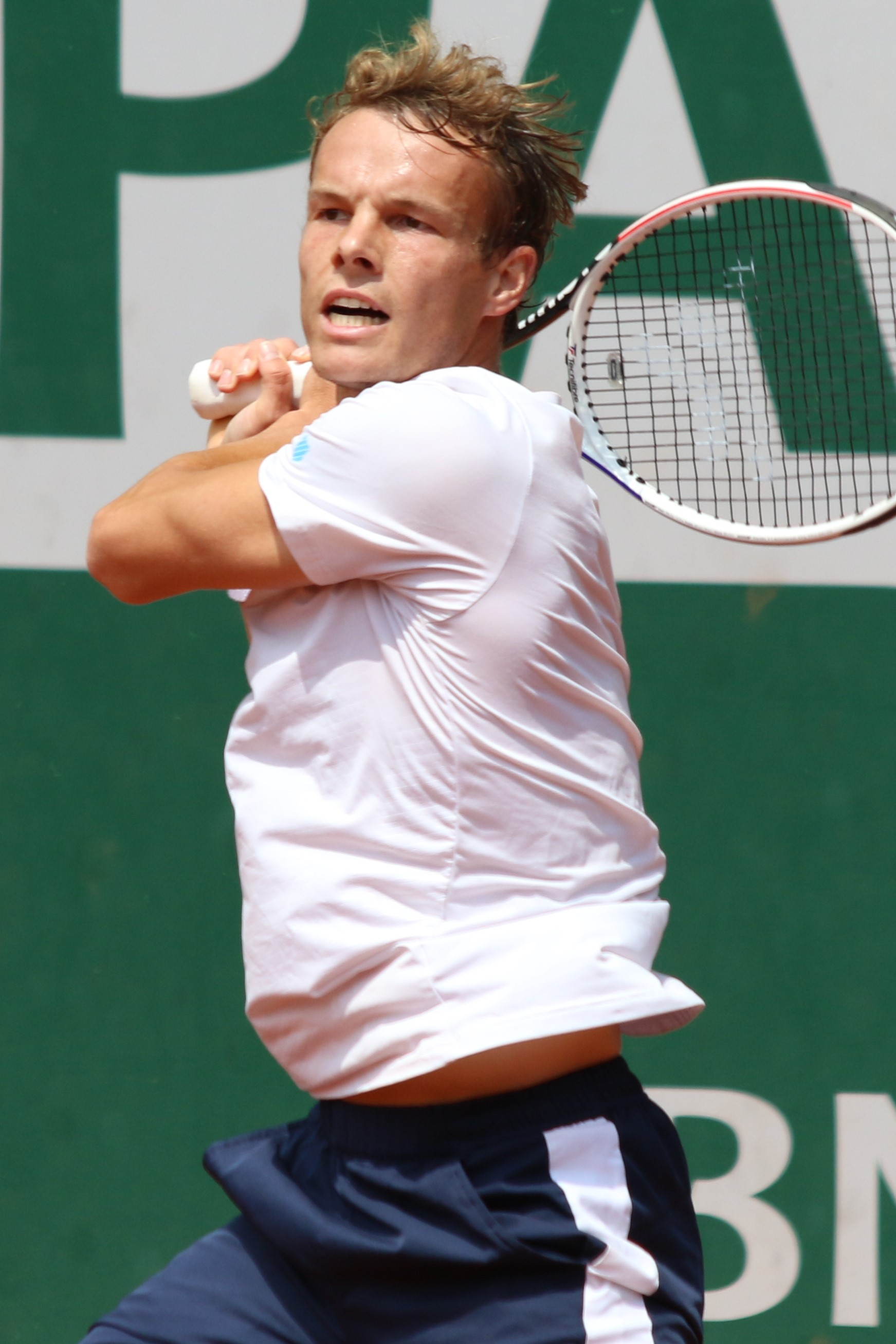
- Geerts at the 2023 French Open
- Country (sports): Belgium
- Residence: Antwerp, Belgium
- Born: 17 January 1995 (age 31) Antwerp, Belgium
- Height: 1.78 m (5 ft 10 in)
- Plays: Right-handed (two-handed backhand)
- University: ASU
- Coach: Thomas Deschamps, Fred Hemmes Jr. (-2025)
- Prize money: US $455,649

Singles
- Career record: 1–2 (at ATP Tour level, Grand Slam level, and in Davis Cup)
- Career titles: 1 Challenger
- Highest ranking: No. 212 (3 April 2023)
- Current ranking: No. 344 (14 September 2026)

Grand Slam singles results
- French Open: Q2 (2023)
- US Open: Q1 (2022)

Doubles
- Career record: 1–3 (at ATP Tour level, Grand Slam level, and in Davis Cup)
- Career titles: 5 Challenger
- Highest ranking: No. 158 (18 May 2026)
- Current ranking: No. 198 (14 September 2026)
- Last updated on: 16 September 2026.

Michael Geerts (born 17 January 1995) is a Belgian tennis player. He has a career high ATP singles ranking of world No. 212 achieved on 3 April 2023 and a career high ATP doubles ranking of No. 158 achieved on 18 May 2026. Geerts competes mainly on the ATP Challenger Tour, where he has won three singles and five doubles titles.

== Career ==
Geerts made his ATP main draw debut at the 2020 European Open in the doubles draw partnering Yannick Mertens.

In 2022, he won two Challenger titles in doubles: in Cassis with Joran Vliegen, and in Ismaning with Patrik Niklas-Salminen.

He took part in the Belgium Davis Cup team in 2021 against Bolivia and in 2022 against France.

== ATP Challenger and ITF Tour Finals ==
=== Singles: 18 (11–7) ===
Legend (singles) ATP Challenger Tour (3–0) ITF Futures/World Tennis Tour (10–7)	Titles by surface Hard (8–4) Clay (2–2) Grass (0–0) Carpet (1–1)

Result	W–L	Date	Tournament	Tier	Surface	Opponent	Score
Win	1–0	Sep 2015	Israel F11, Kiryat Gat	Futures	Hard	(United States) Evan Song	6–2, 6–4
Win	2–0	Sep 2015	Israel F12, Meitar	Futures	Hard	(Italy) Stefano Napolitano	7–6^{(12–10)}, 6–2
Win	3–0	Sep 2018	Belgium F10, Damme	Futures	Clay	(Northern Mariana Islands) Colin Sinclair	6–3, 6–3
Win	4–0	Dec 2018	Usa F34, Waco	Futures	Hard	(France) Maxime Cressy	6–2, 4–6, 6–4
Loss	4–1	Aug 2019	M15 Eupen, Belgium	World Tennis Tour	Clay	(Argentina) Gonzalo Villanueva	4–6, 1–6
Loss	4–2	Oct 2019	M25 Norman, Usa	World Tennis Tour	Hard	(France) Hugo Gaston	4–6, 5–7
Win	5–2	Oct 2019	M25 Claremont, Usa	World Tennis Tour	Hard	(United Kingdom) Liam Broady	6–3, 6–2
Win	6–2	Oct 2019	M25 Waco, Usa	World Tennis Tour	Hard	(United States) Alex Rybakov	7–5, 3–6, 7–6^{(7–4)}
Loss	6–3	Nov 2019	M15 East Lansing, Usa	World Tennis Tour	Hard	(Germany) Daniel Altmaier	6–4, 3–6, 0–6
Loss	6–4	Oct 2020	M15 Forbach, France	World Tennis Tour	Carpet (i)	(France) Antoine Cornut-Chauvinc	2–6, 4–6
Loss	6–5	Nov 2020	M15 Quinta Do Lago, Portugal	World Tennis Tour	Hard	(Portugal) Nuno Borges	0–6, 1–6
Loss	6–6	May 2021	M15 Troisdorf, Germany	World Tennis Tour	Clay	(Germany) Elmar Ejupovic	6–7^{(4–7)}, 2–6
Win	7–6	May 2022	M25 Santa Margherita di Pula, Italy	World Tennis Tour	Clay	(Italy) Alexander Weis	6–3, 3–6, 6–1
Win	8–6	Sep 2023	M25 Bagneres-de-Bigorre, France	World Tennis Tour	Hard	(France) Tristan Lamasine	6–3, 3–6, 7–6^{(9–7)}
Win	9–6	Jun 2024	M25 Martos, Spain	World Tennis Tour	Hard	(France) Arthur Bouquier	6–4 ret.
Loss	9–7	Jul 2024	M25 Castelo Branco, Portugal	World Tennis Tour	Hard	(Portugal) Frederico Ferreira Silva	6–3, 4–6, 2–6
Win	10–7	Oct 2024	M25 Sarreguemines, France	World Tennis Tour	Carpet	(Ukraine) Oleg Prihodko	6–4, 7–5
Win	11–7	Nov 2025	Athens, Greece	Challenger	Hard (i)	(United Kingdom) Arthur Fery	7–5, 4–6, 6–2.
Win	12-7	April 2026	Abidjan, Cote d'Ivoire	Challenger	Hard	(United Kingdom) Hamish Stewart	7–6^{(7–5)}, 7–6^{(7–2)}
Win	13-7	May 2026	Abidjan, Cote d'Ivoire	Challenger	Hard	(United States) Michael Mmoh	6–3, 6–4

== Performance timeline ==
Key
W	F	SF	QF	#R	RR	Q#	DNQ	A	NH

(W) winner; (F) finalist; (SF) semifinalist; (QF) quarterfinalist; (#R) rounds 4, 3, 2, 1; (RR) round-robin stage; (Q#) qualification round; (DNQ) did not qualify; (A) absent; (NH) not held; (SR) strike rate (events won / competed); (W–L) win–loss record.
To avoid confusion and double counting, these charts are updated at the conclusion of a tournament or when the player's participation has ended.

=== Singles ===
Tournament	2022	2023	2024	SR	W–L	Win %
Grand Slam tournaments
Australian Open	A	A	A	0 / 0	0–0	–
French Open	A	Q2	A	0 / 0	0–0	–
Wimbledon	A	A		0 / 0	0–0	–
US Open	Q1	A		0 / 0	0–0	–
Win–loss	0–0	0–0	0–0	0 / 0	0–0	–
