= Dimitris Sakellaridis =

Greek tennis player (born 2006)

- Country (sports): Greece
- Born: 30 April 2006 (age 20) Athens, Greece
- Plays: Right-handed (two-handed backhand)
- Coach: Ioannis Sakellaridis
- Prize money: US $82,433

Singles
- Career record: 0–0 (at ATP Tour level, Grand Slam level, and in Davis Cup)
- Career titles: 0
- Highest ranking: No. 536 (16 November 2026)
- Current ranking: No. 536 (16 November 2026)

Doubles
- Career record: 0-1 (at ATP Tour level, Grand Slam level, and in Davis Cup)
- Career titles: 0
- Highest ranking: No. 311 (29 September 2025)
- Current ranking: No. 392 (16 November 2026)
- Last updated on: 16 November 2026.

Dimitris Sakellaridis (born 30 April 2006) is a Greek professional tennis player. He has a career-high ATP singles ranking of No. 536 achieved on 16 November 2026 and a best doubles ranking of No. 311 achieved on 3 November 2025.

Sakellaridis was the ITF world No. 1 singles player, achieved on 14 October 2024.

He has two brothers, Michalis and Stefanos, who are also tennis players.

Sakellaridis received a wildcard into the main doubles draw of the 2025 Hellenic Championship with his brother Stefanos as his partner, where they lost to Francisco Cabral and Lucas Miedler in the first round.

== ITF World Tennis Tour finals ==
=== Singles: 3 (1 title, 2 runner-ups) ===
Legend ITF WTT (1–2)

Result	W–L	Date	Tournament	Tier	Surface	Opponent	Score
Loss	0–1	Dec 2025	M15 Monastir, Tunisia	WTT	Hard	(France) Robin Bertrand	2–6, 6–7^{(5–7)}
Loss	0–2	Jan 2026	M15 Monastir, Tunisia	WTT	Hard	(Germany) Marlon Vankan	5–7, 3–6
Win	1–2	July 2026	M15 Nova Gorica, Slovenia	WTT	Clay	(Italy) Luca Castagnola	6-1, 6–1

=== Doubles: 27 (8 titles, 19 runner-ups) ===
Legend
WTT (7–18)

Result	W–L	Date	Tournament	Tier	Surface	Partner	Opponents	Score
Loss	0–1	Mar 2023	M15 Monastir, Tunisia	WTT	Hard	(Greece) Stefanos Sakellaridis	(China) Gao Xin (China) Aoran Wang	2–6, 4–6
Loss	0–2	May 2023	M25 Gurb, Spain	WTT	Clay	(Greece) Stefanos Sakellaridis	(Israel) Daniel Cukierman (Argentina) Mariano Kestelboim	3–6, 3–6
Loss	0–3	May 2023	M25 La Nucia, Spain	WTT	Clay	(Greece) Stefanos Sakellaridis	(China) Fajing Sun (Egypt) Amr Elsayed	2–6, 3–6
Loss	0–4	Jul 2023	M25 Getxo, Spain	WTT	Clay	(Greece) Stefanos Sakellaridis	(Spain) Alex Martinez (Spain) Inaki Montes de la Torre	6–7, 2–6
Loss	0–5	Jul 2023	M25 Esch/Alzette, Luxembourg	WTT	Clay	(Greece) Stefanos Sakellaridis	(Luxembourg) Alex Knaff (Luxembourg) Chris Rodesch	3–6, 4–6
Loss	0–6	Jul 2023	M25 Esch/Alzette, Luxembourg	WTT	Clay	(Greece) Stefanos Sakellaridis	(Luxembourg) Alex Knaff (Austria) David Pichler	6–1, 1–6, [7–10]
Loss	0–7	Oct 2023	M15 Heraklion, Greece	WTT	Hard	(Greece) Stefanos Sakellaridis	(Switzerland) Dario Huber (Switzerland) Jacob Kahoun	2–6, 2–6
Loss	0–8	Nov 2023	M15 Heraklion, Greece	WTT	Hard	(Greece) Michalis Sakellaridis	(Bulgaria) Anthony Genov (Bulgaria) Nikolay Nedelchev	2–6, 1–6
Win	1–8	Dec 2023	M15 Monastir, Tunisia	WTT	Hard	(Germany) Florian Broska	(France) Étienne Donnet (France) Fabien Salle	6–4, 5–7, [10–7]
Loss	1–9	Mar 2024	M15 Heraklion, Greece	WTT	Hard	(Greece) Michalis Sakellaridis	(Cyprus) Sergis Kyratzis (Greece) Ioannis Xilas	6–4, 3–6, [3–10]
Loss	1–10	Jul 2024	M25 Wetzlar, Germany	WTT	Clay	(Greece) Michalis Sakellaridis	(Germany) Florian Broska (Austria) Gregor Ramskogler	5–7, 4–6
Win	2–10	Sep 2024	M25 Santa Margherita di Pula, Italy	WTT	Clay	(Ukraine) Oleksii Krutykh	(Czech Republic) Martin Krumich (Czech Republic) Dominik Kellovský	2–6, 6–4, [10–6]
Loss	2–11	Feb 2025	M15 Monastir, Tunisia	WTT	Hard	(Republic of Ireland) Cian Maguire	(Spain) Alberto Barroso Campos (Tunisia) Aziz Ouakaa	4–6, 6–2, [7–10]
Win	3–11	Feb 2025	M15 Monastir, Tunisia	WTT	Hard	(Czech Republic) Tadeas Paroulek	(Germany) Tom Gentzsch (France) Maxence Rivet	4–6, 4–1 ret.
Loss	3–12	Mar 2025	M15 Monastir, Tunisia	WTT	Hard	(Czech Republic) Matthew William Donald	(France) Florent Bax (Slovakia) Lukáš Pokorný	4–6, 4–6
Win	4–12	Apr 2025	M15 Monastir, Tunisia	WTT	Hard	(Belgium) Buvaysar Gadamauri	(Slovakia) Lukáš Pokorný (Latvia) Robert Strombachs	6–3, 6–3
Win	5–12	May 2025	M15 Heraklion, Greece	WTT	Hard	(Japan) Ryuki Matsuda	(United Kingdom) Stefan Cooper (United Kingdom) Matthew Howse	6–2, 7–5
Loss	5–13	Jun 2025	M25 Villeneuve-Loubet, France	WTT	Clay	(Belgium) Buvaysar Gadamauri	(Guadeloupe) Oscar Lacides (France) Tristan Lamasine	6–7(2–7), 4–6
Win	6–13	Jul 2025	M15 Litija, Slovenia	WTT	Clay	(Italy) Gabriele Bosio	(Argentina) Lautaro Agustín Falabella (Italy) Michele Ribecai	7–5, 7–6(7–3)
Loss	6–14	Aug 2025	M15 Slovenska Bistrica, Slovenia	WTT	Clay	(Chinese Taipei) Jeffrey Hsu	(Luxembourg) Louis Van Herck (Germany) Marlon Vankan	6–0, 3–6, [3–10]
Loss	6–15	Aug 2025	M25 Sion, Switzerland	WTT	Clay	(Germany) Kai Wehnelt	(Switzerland) Andrin Casanova (Switzerland) Nicolás Parizzia	3–6, 2–6
Loss	6–16	Aug 2025	M25 Lausanne, Switzerland	WTT	Clay	(Chinese Taipei) Jeffrey Hsu	(Republic of Ireland) Charles Barry (France) Max Westphal	3–6, 6–7(5–7)
Win	7–16	Oct 2025	M15 Heraklion, Greece	WTT	Hard	(South Africa) Vasilios Caripi	(Cyprus) Menelaos Efstathiou (Cyprus) Eleftherios Neos	6–2, 7–6(7–3)
Loss	7–17	Oct 2025	M15 Heraklion, Greece	WTT	Hard	(South Africa) Vasilios Caripi	(Cyprus) Menelaos Efstathiou (Cyprus) Eleftherios Neos	3–6, 4–6
Loss	7–18	Nov 2025	M15 Heraklion, Greece	WTT	Hard	(South Africa) Vasilios Caripi	(Greece) Pavlos Tsitsipas (Greece) Petros Tsitsipas	6–4, 3–6, [10–12]
Win	8–18	May 2026	M15 Prijedor, Bosnia and Herzegovina	WTT	Clay	(France) Felix Balshaw	(Sweden) Nikola Slavic (Bosnia and Herzegovina) Vladan Tadić	5–7, 6–4, [10–1]
Loss	8–19	May 2026	M25 Bol, Croatia	WTT	Clay	(Greece) Michalis Sakellaridis	(Croatia) Admir Kalender (Croatia) Mili Poljičak	4–6, 3–6
