= 2025 Brazzaville Challenger – Doubles =

Doubles
- 2025 Brazzaville Challenger

Final
- Champions: (Brazil) Mateo Barreiros Reyes (Brazil) Paulo André Saraiva dos Santos
- Runners-up: (France) Geoffrey Blancaneaux (France) Maxime Chazal
- Score: 6–4, 1–6, [10–6]

Events
Singles	Doubles
← 2024 ·	Brazzaville Challenger	· 2026 →

Florent Bax and Karan Singh were the defending champions but chose not to defend their title.

Mateo Barreiros Reyes and Paulo André Saraiva dos Santos won the title after defeating Geoffrey Blancaneaux and Maxime Chazal 6–4, 1–6, [10–6] in the final.

== Seeds ==
1. (Brazil) Mateo Barreiros Reyes / (Brazil) Paulo André Saraiva dos Santos (champions)
2. (Italy) Franco Agamenone / (Thailand) Maximus Jones (semifinals)
3. (France) Geoffrey Blancaneaux / (France) Maxime Chazal (final)
4. Ivan Denisov / (Poland) Jasza Szajrych (semifinals)

== Draw ==
=== Key ===
- Q = Qualifier
- WC = Wild card
- LL = Lucky loser
- Alt = Alternate
- ITF = ITF entry
- PR = Protected ranking
- SR = Special ranking
- SE = Special exempt
- JE = Junior exempt
- JR = Junior Accelerator Programme entrant
- CO = College Accelerator Programme entrant
- NG = Next Gen Accelerator Program entrant
- w/o = Walkover
- r = Retired
- d = Defaulted

=== Draw ===
First round
(Austria) M Neuchrist (Germany) Maik Steiner	6	6
(Mexico) Rodrigo Alujas (France) Julien De Cuyper	4	0
4	Ivan Denisov (Poland) Jasza Szajrych	6	6
WC	(United States) Dillon Beckles (Italy) Guelfo Borghini Baldovinetti	2	4
WC	(France) C Hemery (France) P Mamata	4	2
(Algeria) Samir Hamza Reguig (Morocco) Yassine Smiej	6	6
(Czech Republic) D Kellovský (Slovakia) A Martin	3	7	[9]
(Netherlands) G den Ouden (Netherlands) M Houkes	6	5	[11]
(Thailand) Credit Chaiyarin (Argentina) Ezequiel Monferrer	4	1
3	(France) G Blancaneaux (France) M Chazal	6	6
(South Africa) Alec Beckley (Ivory Coast) E Coulibaly	6	6
(Italy) Matteo Covato (Bulgaria) Dinko Dinev	3	4

Quarterfinals
1	(Brazil) M Barreiros Reyes (Brazil) PA Saraiva dos Santos	6	1	[10]
(Austria) M Neuchrist (Germany) M Steiner	3	6	[3]
4	I Denisov (Poland) J Szajrych	6	6
(Algeria) S Hamza Reguig (Morocco) Y Smiej	2	3
(Netherlands) G den Ouden (Netherlands) M Houkes	3	4
3	(France) G Blancaneaux (France) M Chazal	6	6
(South Africa) A Beckley (Ivory Coast) E Coulibaly	4	4
2	(Italy) F Agamenone (Thailand) M Jones	6	6

Semifinals
1	(Brazil) M Barreiros Reyes (Brazil) PA Saraiva dos Santos	6	7^{7}
4	I Denisov (Poland) J Szajrych	2	6^{4}
3	(France) G Blancaneaux (France) M Chazal	6	6
2	(Italy) F Agamenone (Thailand) M Jones	1	4

Final
1	(Brazil) M Barreiros Reyes (Brazil) PA Saraiva dos Santos	6	1	[10]
3	(France) G Blancaneaux (France) M Chazal	4	6	[6]
