= 2026 Brazzaville Challenger – Singles =

Singles
- 2026 Brazzaville Challenger

Final
- Champion: (France) Calvin Hemery
- Runner-up: (France) Florent Bax
- Score: 7–5, 3–6, 7–6^{(7–2)}

Events
Singles	Doubles
- Brazzaville Challenger

Geoffrey Blancaneaux was the defending champion but chose not to defend his title.

Calvin Hemery won the title after defeating Florent Bax 7–5, 3–6, 7–6^{(7–2)} in the final.

== Seeds ==
1. (France) Florent Bax (final)
2. (Ivory Coast) Eliakim Coulibaly (withdrew)
3. (Belgium) Michael Geerts (second round, retired)
4. (Jamaica) Blaise Bicknell (quarterfinals)
5. (France) Calvin Hemery (champion)
6. (France) Mathys Erhard (quarterfinals)
7. (India) Karan Singh (quarterfinals, retired)
8. (Slovenia) Bor Artnak (first round, retired)
9. (Spain) Iván Marrero Curbelo (semifinals)

== Draw ==
Key

- Q = Qualifier
- WC = Wild card
- LL = Lucky loser
- Alt = Alternate
- ITF = ITF entry
- PR = Protected ranking
- SR = Special ranking
- SE = Special exempt
- JE = Junior exempt
- JR = Junior Accelerator Programme entrant
- CO = College Accelerator Programme entrant
- NG = Next Gen Accelerator Program entrant
- w/o = Walkover
- r = Retired
- d = Defaulted

=== Finals ===
Semifinals
1	(France) Florent Bax	6	6
(Argentina) Franco Ribero	4	3
5	(France) Calvin Hemery	6	2	6
9	(Spain) Iván Marrero Curbelo	2	6	1

Final
1	(France) Florent Bax	5	6	6^{2}
5	(France) Calvin Hemery	7	3	7^{7}

=== Top half ===
First round
1	(France) F Bax	6	6
Q	(Australia) Adrian Arcon	2	3
Alt	(Venezuela) B Pérez	2	1
(Morocco) Y Lalami	6	6
(Tunisia) S Mansouri	6	6
Q	(Democratic Republic of the Congo) Bienvenu Bolangi	3	2
Alt	(Australia) Lawrence Bataljin	1	2
6/WC	(France) Mathys Erhard	6	6
3/WC	(Belgium) M Geerts	6	6^{6}	6
(Bulgaria) Dinko Dinev	2	7^{8}	2
Q	(Zimbabwe) CJ Lock	1	0^{r}
(Finland) Iiro Vasa	6	1
Q	(India) Parth Aggarwal	3	6^{0}
(Argentina) F Ribero	6	7^{7}
(Czech Republic) Matyáš Černý	6	3
8	(Slovenia) B Artnak	1	1^{r}

Second round
1	(France) F Bax	6	6
(Morocco) Y Lalami	2	4
(Tunisia) S Mansouri	3	0^{r}
6/WC	(France) M Erhard	6	0
3/WC	(Belgium) M Geerts	6^{8}	1^{r}
(Finland) I Vasa	7^{10}	2
(Argentina) F Ribero	1	7^{8}	6
(Czech Republic) M Černý	6	6^{6}	4

Quarterfinals
1	(France) F Bax	6	6
6/WC	(France) M Erhard	3	4
(Finland) I Vasa	4	6^{5}
(Argentina) F Ribero	6	7^{7}

Semifinals
1	(France) F Bax	6	6
(Argentina) F Ribero	4	3

=== Bottom half ===
First round
5	(France) C Hemery	7^{7}	6
Alt	(Tunisia) A Dougaz	6^{3}	3
(Morocco) R Bennani	6	1	7^{7}
(Brazil) PA Saraiva dos Santos	4	6	6^{4}
(India) Aditya Vishal Balsekar	6	6
Alt	(United States) Gray Voelzke	4	1
Q	(Brazil) L Britto	3^{r}
4	(Jamaica) B Bicknell	2
7	(India) K Singh	6	6
(United States) Matt Kleiman	3	2
(India) Digvijaypratap Singh	7	6
(United States) Dillon Beckles	5	3
Q	(Antigua and Barbuda) J Maginley	3	6^{3}
(Italy) Matteo Covato	6	7^{7}
(France) Elijah Sanogo	0	4
9	(Spain) Iván Marrero Curbelo	6	6

Second round
5	(France) C Hemery	4	6	6
(Morocco) R Bennani	6	4	3
(India) A Vishal Balsekar	4	4
4	(Jamaica) B Bicknell	6	6
7	(India) K Singh	6	7
(India) D Singh	3	5
(Italy) M Covato	1	1
9	(Spain) I Marrero Curbelo	6	6

Quarterfinals
5	(France) C Hemery	3	6	6
4	(Jamaica) B Bicknell	6	1	3
7	(India) K Singh	6^{5}	0^{r}
9	(Spain) I Marrero Curbelo	7^{7}	1

Semifinals
5	(France) C Hemery	6	2	6
9	(Spain) I Marrero Curbelo	2	6	1
