= 2025 Brazzaville Challenger – Singles =

Singles
- 2025 Brazzaville Challenger

Final
- Champion: (France) Geoffrey Blancaneaux
- Runner-up: (France) Calvin Hemery
- Score: 6–3, 6–4

Events
Singles	Doubles
← 2024 ·	Brazzaville Challenger	· 2026 →

Gonzalo Oliveira was the defending champion but was unable to defend his title due to a suspension from professional tennis for methamphetamine use.

Geoffrey Blancaneaux won the title after defeating Calvin Hemery 6–3, 6–4 in the final.

== Seeds ==
1. (France) Calvin Hemery (final)
2. (France) Geoffrey Blancaneaux (champion)
3. (Netherlands) Max Houkes (quarterfinals)
4. (France) Maxime Chazal (second round)
5. (Netherlands) Guy den Ouden (second round)
6. (Ivory Coast) Eliakim Coulibaly (quarterfinals)
7. (Italy) Franco Agamenone (quarterfinals)
8. (Slovakia) Andrej Martin (second round)

== Draw ==
=== Key ===
- Q = Qualifier
- WC = Wild card
- LL = Lucky loser
- Alt = Alternate
- ITF = ITF entry
- PR = Protected ranking
- SR = Special ranking
- SE = Special exempt
- JE = Junior exempt
- JR = Junior Accelerator Programme entrant
- CO = College Accelerator Programme entrant
- NG = Next Gen Accelerator Program entrant
- w/o = Walkover
- r = Retired
- d = Defaulted

=== Finals ===
Semifinals
1	(France) Calvin Hemery	6	6
(Thailand) Maximus Jones	1	4
Alt	(Bulgaria) Dinko Dinev	1	2
2	(France) Geoffrey Blancaneaux	6	6

Final
1	(France) Calvin Hemery	3	4
2	(France) Geoffrey Blancaneaux	6	6

=== Top half ===
First round
Alt	(Sweden) M Ymer	6	6
Alt	(France) Julien De Cuyper	3	2
Alt	(Argentina) Ezequiel Monferrer	4	3
(Austria) M Neuchrist	6	6
(South Africa) Alec Beckley	4	6	4
7	(Italy) F Agamenone	6	4	6
3	(Netherlands) M Houkes	6	6
WC	(Gabon) Kryce-Didier Momo-Kassa	0	0
Alt	(Italy) Guelfo Borghini Baldovinetti	1	3
Alt	(Mexico) Rodrigo Alujas	6	6
Alt	(Italy) Matteo Covato	1	5
(Thailand) M Jones	6	7
WC	(South Africa) Nicholas van Aken	0	0
8	(Slovakia) A Martin	6	6

Second round
1	(France) C Hemery	7^{7}	2	6
Alt	(Sweden) M Ymer	6^{5}	6	2
(Austria) M Neuchrist	4	1
7	(Italy) F Agamenone	6	6
3	(Netherlands) M Houkes	6	6
Alt	(Mexico) R Alujas	3	3
(Thailand) M Jones	7	3	7^{7}
8	(Slovakia) A Martin	5	6	6^{5}

Quarterfinals
1	(France) C Hemery	6	6
7	(Italy) F Agamenone	3	3
3	(Netherlands) M Houkes	6	3	1
(Thailand) M Jones	2	6	6

Semifinals
1	(France) C Hemery	6	6
(Thailand) M Jones	1	4

=== Bottom half ===
First round
6	(Ivory Coast) E Coulibaly	6	1	6
(Germany) Maik Steiner	3	6	4
(Thailand) Credit Chaiyarin	7^{9}	6
(Poland) Jasza Szajrych	6^{7}	2
WC	(France) P Mamata	7	1	2
Alt	(Bulgaria) Dinko Dinev	5	6	6
Alt	(Morocco) Yassine Smiej	0	3
4	(France) M Chazal	6	6
5	(Netherlands) G den Ouden	6	6
Alt	Ivan Denisov	1	3
Alt	(Brazil) PA Saraiva dos Santos	6	6
Q	(United States) Dillon Beckles	2	3
(Czech Republic) D Kellovský	5	6	6
(Brazil) M Barreiros Reyes	7	2	2
(Algeria) Samir Hamza Reguig	3	6^{3}
2	(France) G Blancaneaux	6	7^{7}

Second round
6	(Ivory Coast) E Coulibaly	6	1
(Thailand) C Chaiyarin	2	0^{r}
Alt	(Bulgaria) D Dinev	6	6
4	(France) M Chazal	4	4
5	(Netherlands) G den Ouden	4	4
Alt	(Brazil) PA Saraiva dos Santos	6	6
(Czech Republic) D Kellovský	5	1
2	(France) G Blancaneaux	7	6

Quarterfinals
6	(Ivory Coast) E Coulibaly	6	3	4
Alt	(Bulgaria) D Dinev	3	6	6
Alt	(Brazil) PA Saraiva dos Santos	0	6	1
2	(France) G Blancaneaux	6	4	6

Semifinals
Alt	(Bulgaria) D Dinev	1	2
2	(France) G Blancaneaux	6	6
