= 2024 Brazzaville Challenger – Doubles =

Doubles
- 2024 Brazzaville Challenger

Final
- Champions: (France) Florent Bax (India) Karan Singh
- Runners-up: (Italy) Simone Agostini (South Africa) Alec Beckley
- Score: 7–5, 6–1

Events
Singles	Doubles
Brazzaville Challenger	· 2025 →

This was the first edition of the tournament.

Florent Bax and Karan Singh won the title after defeating Simone Agostini and Alec Beckley 7–5, 6–1 in the final.

== Seeds ==
1. (Zimbabwe) Benjamin Lock / (Zimbabwe) Courtney John Lock (semifinals)
2. (France) Corentin Denolly / (Tunisia) Aziz Ouakaa (semifinals, retired)
3. (Romania) Filip Cristian Jianu / (Argentina) Santiago Rodríguez Taverna (quarterfinals)
4. (Italy) Simone Agostini / (South Africa) Alec Beckley (final)

== Draw ==
=== Key ===
- Q = Qualifier
- WC = Wild card
- LL = Lucky loser
- Alt = Alternate
- ITF = ITF entry
- PR = Protected ranking
- SR = Special ranking
- SE = Special exempt
- JE = Junior exempt
- JR = Junior Accelerator Programme entrant
- CO = College Accelerator Programme entrant
- NG = Next Gen Accelerator Program entrant
- w/o = Walkover
- r = Retired
- d = Defaulted

=== Draw ===
First round
WC	(South Africa) Nicholas van Aken (Hong Kong) Yam Chun-ming	4	0
(France) Julien De Cuyper (France) C Hemery	6	6
(Ivory Coast) E Coulibaly (Burundi) GO Iradukunda	6	3	[2]
(France) F Bax (India) K Singh	4	6	[10]
(Ghana) Abraham Asaba (Ghana) I Nortey	7^{9}	6
(Thailand) Credit Chaiyarin (Italy) Matteo Covato	6^{7}	2
(Venezuela) Juan José Bianchi (Venezuela) B Pérez	5	4
4	(Italy) Simone Agostini (South Africa) Alec Beckley	7	6
(Romania) Dragoș Nicolae Cazacu (Algeria) Samir Hamza Reguig	4	6	[10]
(United States) Dhruva Mulye (Venezuela) G Oliveira	6	1	[8]

Quarterfinals
1	(Zimbabwe) B Lock (Zimbabwe) CJ Lock	6	6
(France) J De Cuyper (France) C Hemery	2	3
3	(Romania) FC Jianu (Argentina) S Rodríguez Taverna	3	4
(France) F Bax (India) K Singh	6	6
(Ghana) A Asaba (Ghana) I Nortey	6	4	[10]
4	(Italy) S Agostini (South Africa) A Beckley	0	6	[12]
(Romania) DN Cazacu (Algeria) S Hamza Reguig	3	1
2	(France) C Denolly (Tunisia) A Ouakaa	6	6

Semifinals
1	(Zimbabwe) B Lock (Zimbabwe) CJ Lock	6	3	[5]
(France) F Bax (India) K Singh	2	6	[10]
4	(Italy) S Agostini (South Africa) A Beckley	3
2	(France) C Denolly (Tunisia) A Ouakaa	1^{r}

Final
(France) F Bax (India) K Singh	7	6
4	(Italy) S Agostini (South Africa) A Beckley	5	1
