= 2024 Brazzaville Challenger – Singles =

Singles
- 2024 Brazzaville Challenger

Final
- Champion: (Venezuela) Gonzalo Oliveira
- Runner-up: (Romania) Filip Cristian Jianu
- Score: 6–4, 6–3

Events
Singles	Doubles
Brazzaville Challenger	· 2025 →

This was the first edition of the tournament.

Gonzalo Oliveira won the title after defeating Filip Cristian Jianu 6–4, 6–3 in the final.

== Seeds ==
1. (Romania) Filip Cristian Jianu (final)
2. (Argentina) Santiago Rodríguez Taverna (semifinals)
3. (France) Calvin Hemery (quarterfinals)
4. (Venezuela) Gonzalo Oliveira (champion)
5. (France) Corentin Denolly (quarterfinals)
6. (Zimbabwe) Benjamin Lock (second round)
7. (Ivory Coast) Eliakim Coulibaly (semifinals)
8. (France) Florent Bax (second round)

== Draw ==
=== Key ===
- Q = Qualifier
- WC = Wild card
- LL = Lucky loser
- Alt = Alternate
- ITF = ITF entry
- PR = Protected ranking
- SR = Special ranking
- SE = Special exempt
- JE = Junior exempt
- JR = Junior Accelerator Programme entrant
- CO = College Accelerator Programme entrant
- NG = Next Gen Accelerator Program entrant
- w/o = Walkover
- r = Retired
- d = Defaulted

=== Finals ===
Semifinals
1/WC	(Romania) Filip Cristian Jianu	6	6
7	(Ivory Coast) Eliakim Coulibaly	3	2
4	(Venezuela) Gonzalo Oliveira	7^{7}	6
2	(Argentina) Santiago Rodríguez Taverna	6^{3}	1

Final
1/WC	(Romania) Filip Cristian Jianu	4	3
4	(Venezuela) Gonzalo Oliveira	6	6

=== Top half ===
First round
1/WC	(Romania) FC Jianu	6	6
(Tunisia) A Ouakaa	4	2
WC	(United States) Dhruva Mulye	0	3
Q	(France) Julien De Cuyper	6	6
(India) K Singh	3	6	6
(Peru) Petr Iamachkine	6	1	4
(Venezuela) B Pérez	1	6^{0}
8	(France) F Bax	6	7^{7}
3	(France) C Hemery	6	6
Q	(India) Yuvan Nandal	3	1
PR	(Zimbabwe) CJ Lock	3	2
Q	(Italy) Matteo Covato	6	6
Alt	(Algeria) Samir Hamza Reguig	6	6
(Ghana) Abraham Asaba	3	0
(Burundi) GO Iradukunda	4	6	3
7	(Ivory Coast) E Coulibaly	6	3	6

Second round
1/WC	(Romania) FC Jianu	6	6
Q	(France) J De Cuyper	1	3
(India) K Singh	5	6	6
8	(France) F Bax	7	1	3
3	(France) C Hemery	6	6
Q	(Italy) M Covato	0	3
Alt	(Algeria) S Hamza Reguig	4	3
7	(Ivory Coast) E Coulibaly	6	6

Quarterfinals
1/WC	(Romania) FC Jianu	6	6
(India) K Singh	4	2
3	(France) C Hemery	3	5
7	(Ivory Coast) E Coulibaly	6	7

Semifinals
1/WC	(Romania) FC Jianu	6	6
7	(Ivory Coast) E Coulibaly	3	2

=== Bottom half ===
First round
6	(Zimbabwe) B Lock	6	6
(Venezuela) Juan José Bianchi	1	2
Alt	(India) Dev Javia	6	6
(Italy) Simone Agostini	3	4
(Ghana) I Nortey	3	4
(United States) Preston Brown	6	6
Q	(Australia) Lawrence Bataljin	0	1
4	(Venezuela) G Oliveira	6	6
5	(France) C Denolly	6	6
Q	(Hong Kong) Yam Chun-ming	0	1
Q	(Romania) Dragoș Nicolae Cazacu	6	6
(Thailand) Credit Chaiyarin	4	2
(United States) H Rousseau	5	2
(Colombia) Daniel Salazar	7	6
(South Africa) Alec Beckley	4	5
2	(Argentina) S Rodríguez Taverna	6	7

Second round
6	(Zimbabwe) B Lock	6^{4}	5
Alt	(India) D Javia	7^{7}	7
(United States) P Brown	2	3
4	(Venezuela) G Oliveira	6	6
5	(France) C Denolly	6	5	7^{7}
Q	(Romania) DN Cazacu	1	7	6^{2}
(Colombia) D Salazar	2	4
2	(Argentina) S Rodríguez Taverna	6	6

Quarterfinals
Alt	(India) D Javia	4	3
4	(Venezuela) G Oliveira	6	6
5	(France) C Denolly	3	6^{5}
2	(Argentina) S Rodríguez Taverna	6	7^{7}

Semifinals
4	(Venezuela) G Oliveira	7^{7}	6
2	(Argentina) S Rodríguez Taverna	6^{3}	1
