= 2026 Brazzaville Challenger – Doubles =

Doubles
- 2026 Brazzaville Challenger

Final
- Champions: (Venezuela) Brandon Pérez (Argentina) Franco Ribero
- Runners-up: (Belgium) Michael Geerts (Tunisia) Skander Mansouri
- Score: 6–3, 6–4

Events
Singles	Doubles
- Brazzaville Challenger

Mateo Barreiros Reyes and Paulo André Saraiva dos Santos were the defending champions but only Saraiva dos Santos chose to defend his title, partnering Luís Britto. They lost in the semifinals to Michael Geerts and Skander Mansouri.

Brandon Pérez and Franco Ribero won the title after defeating Geerts and Mansouri 6–3, 6–4 in the final.

== Seeds ==
1. (Brazil) Luís Britto / (Brazil) Paulo André Saraiva dos Santos (semifinals)
2. (Zimbabwe) Courtney John Lock / (Antigua and Barbuda) Jody Maginley (semifinals)
3. (Morocco) Younes Lalami / (Spain) Iván Marrero Curbelo (quarterfinals)
4. (Venezuela) Brandon Pérez / (Argentina) Franco Ribero (champions)

== Draw ==
Key

- Q = Qualifier
- WC = Wild card
- LL = Lucky loser
- Alt = Alternate
- ITF = ITF entry
- PR = Protected ranking
- SR = Special ranking
- SE = Special exempt
- JE = Junior exempt
- JR = Junior Accelerator Programme entrant
- CO = College Accelerator Programme entrant
- NG = Next Gen Accelerator Program entrant
- w/o = Walkover
- r = Retired
- d = Defaulted

First round
(Australia) Adrian Arcon (United States) Matt Kleiman	6	6
(India) Parth Aggarwal (Monaco) Lenny Petit	2	2
3	(Morocco) Y Lalami (Spain) Iván Marrero Curbelo	6^{6}	6	[14]
(Slovenia) B Artnak (Italy) Matteo Covato	7^{8}	3	[12]
WC	(Democratic Republic of the Congo) Fiston Nsele (Republic of the Congo) Cheik Pandzou Ekoumé	0	1
(United States) Dillon Beckles (Bulgaria) Dinko Dinev	6	6
(India) Aditya Vishal Balsekar (United States) Gray Voelzke	3	3
4	(Venezuela) B Pérez (Argentina) F Ribero	6	6
(Australia) Lawrence Bataljin (Greece) George Gregoriou	2	1
(Czech Republic) Matyáš Černý (Finland) Iiro Vasa	6	6

Quarterfinals
1	(Brazil) L Britto (Brazil) PA Saraiva dos Santos	6	6
(Australia) A Arcon (United States) M Kleiman	4	3
3	(Morocco) Y Lalami (Spain) I Marrero Curbelo	3	4
(Belgium) M Geerts (Tunisia) S Mansouri	6	6
(United States) D Beckles (Bulgaria) D Dinev	3	3
4	(Venezuela) B Pérez (Argentina) F Ribero	6	6
(Czech Republic) M Černý (Finland) I Vasa	2	4
2	(Zimbabwe) CJ Lock (Antigua and Barbuda) J Maginley	6	6

Semifinals
1	(Brazil) L Britto (Brazil) PA Saraiva dos Santos	5	6	[5]
(Belgium) M Geerts (Tunisia) S Mansouri	7	4	[10]
4	(Venezuela) B Pérez (Argentina) F Ribero	7	5	[10]
2	(Zimbabwe) CJ Lock (Antigua and Barbuda) J Maginley	5	7	[8]

Final
(Belgium) M Geerts (Tunisia) S Mansouri	3	4
4	(Venezuela) B Pérez (Argentina) F Ribero	6	6
