= Brazzaville Challenger =

- 2025 Brazzaville Challenger

ATP Challenger Tour
- Location: Brazzaville, Republic of the Congo
- Category: ATP Challenger Tour
- Surface: Clay

The Brazzaville Challenger is a professional tennis tournament played on clay courts. It is currently part of the ATP Challenger Tour. It was first held in Brazzaville, Republic of the Congo in 2024.

== Past finals ==
=== Singles ===
Year	Champion	Runner-up	Score
2026	(France) Calvin Hemery	(France) Florent Bax	7–5, 3–6, 7–6^{(7–2)}
2025	(France) Geoffrey Blancaneaux	(France) Calvin Hemery	6–3, 6–4
2024	(Venezuela) Gonzalo Oliveira	(Romania) Filip Cristian Jianu	6–4, 6–3

=== Doubles ===
Year	Champions	Runners-up	Score
2026	(Venezuela) Brandon Pérez (Argentina) Franco Ribero	(Belgium) Michael Geerts (Tunisia) Skander Mansouri	6–3, 6–4
2025	(Brazil) Mateo Barreiros Reyes (Brazil) Paulo André Saraiva dos Santos	(France) Geoffrey Blancaneaux (France) Maxime Chazal	6–4, 1–6, [10–6]
2024	(France) Florent Bax (India) Karan Singh	(Italy) Simone Agostini (South Africa) Alec Beckley	7–5, 6–1
