= 2024 Ibagué Open – Doubles =

Doubles
- 2024 Ibagué Open

Final
- Champions: (New Zealand) Finn Reynolds (Chile) Matías Soto
- Runners-up: (Argentina) Leonardo Aboian (Argentina) Valerio Aboian
- Score: 6–4, 4–6, [10–7]

Events
Singles	Doubles
- Ibagué Open

This was the first edition of the tournament.

Finn Reynolds and Matías Soto won the title after defeating Leonardo and Valerio Aboian 6–4, 4–6, [10–7] in the final.

== Seeds ==
1. (Brazil) Luís Britto / (Argentina) Gonzalo Villanueva (quarterfinals)
2. (New Zealand) Finn Reynolds / (Chile) Matías Soto (champions)
3. (Japan) Seita Watanabe / (Japan) Takeru Yuzuki (semifinals)
4. (Colombia) Juan Sebastián Gómez / (Colombia) Andrés Urrea (first round)

== Draw ==
Key

- Q = Qualifier
- WC = Wild card
- LL = Lucky loser
- Alt = Alternate
- ITF = ITF entry
- PR = Protected ranking
- SR = Special ranking
- SE = Special exempt
- JE = Junior exempt
- JR = Junior Accelerator Programme entrant
- CO = College Accelerator Programme entrant
- NG = Next Gen Accelerator Program entrant
- w/o = Walkover
- r = Retired
- d = Defaulted

=== Draw ===
First round
1	(Brazil) L Britto (Argentina) G Villanueva	7	7^{8}
Aleksandr Lobanov; Alexey Nesterov	5	6^{6}
Alt	(Brazil) M Barreiros Reyes (Japan) Kosuke Ogura	4	7^{15}	[10]
(Argentina) Tomás Farjat (Bolivia) JC Prado Ángelo	6	6^{13}	[8]
4	(Colombia) JS Gómez (Colombia) A Urrea	5	6^{6}
(Argentina) Leonardo Aboian (Argentina) V Aboian	7	7^{8}
WC	(Colombia) Michael Alejandro Beltrán Rubio (Colombia) Sebastián Serrano	3	2
(Spain) Diego Augusto Barreto Sánchez (United States) Alexander Stater	6	6
WC	(Colombia) Samuel Heredia (Colombia) N Mejía	6^{5}	3
(Colombia) Johan Alexander Rodríguez (Colombia) A Soriano Barrera	7^{7}	6
(Brazil) M Pucinelli de Almeida (Brazil) Nicolas Zanellato	6^{1}	2
3	(Japan) S Watanabe (Japan) T Yuzuki	7^{7}	6
(Venezuela) B Pérez (United States) N Schachter	6	3	[4]
(Ecuador) Á Guillén Meza (Argentina) AL Lingua Lavallén	4	6	[10]
(United States) G Johns (United States) P Kumar	1	4
2	(New Zealand) F Reynolds (Chile) M Soto	6	6

Quarterfinals
1	(Brazil) L Britto (Argentina) G Villanueva	4	4
Alt	(Brazil) M Barreiros Reyes (Japan) K Ogura	6	6
(Argentina) L Aboian (Argentina) V Aboian	7	4	[10]
(Spain) DA Barreto Sánchez (United States) A Stater	5	6	[7]
(Colombia) JA Rodríguez (Colombia) A Soriano Barrera	4	7	[7]
3	(Japan) S Watanabe (Japan) T Yuzuki	6	5	[10]
(Ecuador) Á Guillén Meza (Argentina) AL Lingua Lavallén	3	2
2	(New Zealand) F Reynolds (Chile) M Soto	6	6

Semifinals
Alt	(Brazil) M Barreiros Reyes (Japan) K Ogura	4	3
(Argentina) L Aboian (Argentina) V Aboian	6	6
3	(Japan) S Watanabe (Japan) T Yuzuki	1	5
2	(New Zealand) F Reynolds (Chile) M Soto	6	7

Final
(Argentina) L Aboian (Argentina) V Aboian	4	6	[7]
2	(New Zealand) F Reynolds (Chile) M Soto	6	4	[10]
