= 2025 Brazzaville Challenger =

- Date: 17 – 23 February
- Edition: 2nd
- Surface: Clay
- Location: Brazzaville, Republic of the Congo

Champions

Singles
- (France) Geoffrey Blancaneaux

Doubles
- (Brazil) Mateo Barreiros Reyes / (Brazil) Paulo André Saraiva dos Santos
← 2024 ·	Brazzaville Challenger	· 2026 →

The 2025 Brazzaville Challenger was a professional tennis tournament played on clay courts. It was the second edition of the tournament which was part of the 2025 ATP Challenger Tour. It took place in Brazzaville, Republic of the Congo between 17 and 23 February 2025.

== Singles main-draw entrants ==
=== Seeds ===
Country	Player	Rank^{1}	Seed
FRA	Calvin Hemery	194	1
FRA	Geoffrey Blancaneaux	270	2
NED	Max Houkes	314	3
FRA	Maxime Chazal	337	4
NED	Guy den Ouden	340	5
CIV	Eliakim Coulibaly	341	6
ITA	Franco Agamenone	390	7
SVK	Andrej Martin	431	8

- ^{1} Rankings are as of 10 February 2025.

=== Other entrants ===
The following players received wildcards into the singles main draw:

- (France) Paterne Mamata
- (Gabon) Kryce-Didier Momo-Kassa
- (South Africa) Nicholas van Aken

The following players received entry into the singles main draw as alternates:

- (Mexico) Rodrigo Alujas
- (Italy) Guelfo Borghini Baldovinetti
- (Italy) Matteo Covato
- (France) Julien De Cuyper
- Ivan Denisov
- (Bulgaria) Dinko Dinev
- (Argentina) Ezequiel Monferrer
- (Brazil) Paulo André Saraiva dos Santos
- (Morocco) Yassine Smiej
- (Sweden) Mikael Ymer

The following player received entry from the qualifying draw:

- (United States) Dillon Beckles

== Champions ==
=== Singles ===
- (France) Geoffrey Blancaneaux def. (France) Calvin Hemery 6–3, 6–4.

=== Doubles ===
- (Brazil) Mateo Barreiros Reyes / (Brazil) Paulo André Saraiva dos Santos def. (France) Geoffrey Blancaneaux / (France) Maxime Chazal 6–4, 1–6, [10–6].
