= 2024 Ibagué Open – Singles =

Singles
- 2024 Ibagué Open

Final
- Champion: (Ecuador) Álvaro Guillén Meza
- Runner-up: (Argentina) Facundo Mena
- Score: 6–0, 6–4

Events
Singles	Doubles
Ibagué Open	· 2025 →

This was the first edition of the tournament.

Álvaro Guillén Meza won the title after defeating Facundo Mena 6–0, 6–4 in the final.

== Seeds ==
1. (Australia) Bernard Tomic (withdrew)
2. (Colombia) Nicolás Mejía (semifinals)
3. (Lebanon) Hady Habib (quarterfinals)
4. (Ecuador) Álvaro Guillén Meza (champion)
5. (Argentina) Facundo Mena (final)
6. (Argentina) Renzo Olivo (second round)
7. (Brazil) Matheus Pucinelli de Almeida (second round)
8. (Chile) Matías Soto (semifinals)
9. (Argentina) Juan Bautista Torres (quarterfinals)

== Draw ==
Key

- Q = Qualifier
- WC = Wild card
- LL = Lucky loser
- Alt = Alternate
- ITF = ITF entry
- PR = Protected ranking
- SR = Special ranking
- SE = Special exempt
- JE = Junior exempt
- JR = Junior Accelerator Programme entrant
- CO = College Accelerator Programme entrant
- NG = Next Gen Accelerator Program entrant
- w/o = Walkover
- r = Retired
- d = Defaulted

=== Finals ===
Semifinals
8	(Chile) Matías Soto	6^{1}	6	2
5	(Argentina) Facundo Mena	7^{7}	3	6
4	(Ecuador) Álvaro Guillén Meza	6	6
2	(Colombia) Nicolás Mejía	3	2

Final
5	(Argentina) Facundo Mena	0	4
4	(Ecuador) Álvaro Guillén Meza	6	6

=== Top half ===
First round
9	(Argentina) JB Torres	6	0	6
(Brazil) P Boscardin Dias	1	6	3
(Argentina) Leonardo Aboian	7^{7}	7^{7}
(Argentina) G Villanueva	6^{4}	6^{4}
Q	(Brazil) M Barreiros Reyes	3	6	6
Q	(Colombia) JS Gómez	6	4	1
(Brazil) Nicolas Zanellato	4	4
8	(Chile) M Soto	6	6
3	(Lebanon) H Habib	6	6
Q	(United States) Alexander Stater	4	1
(Dominican Republic) R Cid Subervi	6	7^{7}
(Colombia) A Soriano Barrera	4	6^{3}
Alt	(Spain) Diego Augusto Barreto Sánchez	2	6	2
(Bolivia) JC Prado Ángelo	6	1	6
(United States) G Johns	6^{1}	4
5	(Argentina) F Mena	7^{7}	6

Second round
9	(Argentina) JB Torres	3	6	6
(Argentina) L Aboian	6	3	2
Q	(Brazil) M Barreiros Reyes	6^{3}	2
8	(Chile) M Soto	7^{7}	6
3	(Lebanon) H Habib	6	3
(Dominican Republic) R Cid Subervi	3	2^{r}
(Bolivia) JC Prado Ángelo	4	6^{5}
5	(Argentina) F Mena	6	7^{7}

Quarterfinals
9	(Argentina) JB Torres	2	4
8	(Chile) M Soto	6	6
3	(Lebanon) H Habib	4	6^{6}
5	(Argentina) F Mena	6	7^{8}

Semifinals
8	(Chile) M Soto	6^{1}	6	2
5	(Argentina) F Mena	7^{7}	3	6

=== Bottom half ===
First round
6	(Argentina) R Olivo	6	7^{7}
Q	(Chile) Daniel Antonio Núñez	2	6^{3}
Q	(Mexico) A Hernández	4	2
(Argentina) V Aboian	6	6
LL	(United States) N Schachter	6^{3}	6	6
Q	(United States) Dali Blanch	7^{7}	4	2
WC	(Colombia) Juan Sebastián Osorio	1	0
4	(Ecuador) Á Guillén Meza	6	6
7	(Brazil) M Pucinelli de Almeida	6	6
WC	(Colombia) Samuel Heredia	3	2
(Brazil) J Pereira	3	6	3
(Argentina) Tomás Farjat	6	3	6
(United States) U Blanch	5	3
(Argentina) AL Lingua Lavallén	7	6
WC	(Colombia) Johan Alexander Rodríguez	2	1
2	(Colombia) N Mejía	6	6

Second round
6	(Argentina) R Olivo	6^{7}	1
(Argentina) V Aboian	7^{9}	6
LL	(United States) N Schachter	0	2
4	(Ecuador) Á Guillén Meza	6	6
7	(Brazil) M Pucinelli de Almeida	6	6^{5}	2
(Argentina) T Farjat	4	7^{7}	6
(Argentina) AL Lingua Lavallén	3	2
2	(Colombia) N Mejía	6	6

Quarterfinals
(Argentina) V Aboian	1	3
4	(Ecuador) Á Guillén Meza	6	6
(Argentina) T Farjat	2	3
2	(Colombia) N Mejía	6	6

Semifinals
4	(Ecuador) Á Guillén Meza	6	6
2	(Colombia) N Mejía	3	2
