= 2023 Copa Sevilla – Doubles =

Doubles
- 2023 Copa Sevilla

Final
- Champions: (Spain) Alberto Barroso Campos (Spain) Pedro Martínez
- Runners-up: (India) Sriram Balaji (Brazil) Fernando Romboli
- Score: 3–6, 7–6^{(7–5)}, [11–9]

Events
Singles	Doubles
- Copa Sevilla

Román Andrés Burruchaga and Facundo Díaz Acosta were the defending champions but chose not to defend their title.

Alberto Barroso Campos and Pedro Martínez won the title after defeating Sriram Balaji and Fernando Romboli 3–6, 7–6^{(7–5)}, [11–9] in the final.

== Seeds ==
1. (France) Sadio Doumbia / (France) Fabien Reboul (semifinals)
2. (Mexico) Miguel Ángel Reyes-Varela / (Spain) David Vega Hernández (first round)
3. (Ecuador) Diego Hidalgo / (Colombia) Cristian Rodríguez (first round)
4. (India) Sriram Balaji / (Brazil) Fernando Romboli (final)

== Draw ==
Key

- Q = Qualifier
- WC = Wild card
- LL = Lucky loser
- Alt = Alternate
- ITF = ITF entry
- PR = Protected ranking
- SR = Special ranking
- SE = Special exempt
- JE = Junior exempt
- JR = Junior Accelerator Programme entrant
- CO = College Accelerator Programme entrant
- NG = Next Gen Accelerator Program entrant
- w/o = Walkover
- r = Retired
- d = Defaulted

First round
1	(France) S Doumbia (France) F Reboul	6	6
Alt	(Spain) J Barranco Cosano (Spain) B Winter López	4	4
WC	(Spain) D Marrero (United States) Dhruva Mulye	3	2
(France) M Bourgue (France) V Royer	6	6
4	(India) S Balaji (Brazil) F Romboli	6	6
(France) G Blancaneaux (France) C Hemery	4	4
(United States) A Lawson (Finland) E Vasa	w/o
(Kazakhstan) T Skatov (Spain) C Taberner
(Bulgaria) A Andreev (Spain) N Sánchez Izquierdo	6	6^{4}	[10]
WC	(United States) Jack Vance (United States) Tennyson Whiting	2	7^{7}	[6]
(Spain) A Barroso Campos (Spain) P Martínez	7	6
3	(Ecuador) D Hidalgo (Colombia) C Rodríguez	5	3
(Spain) Í Cervantes (Spain) O Roca Batalla	w/o
(Italy) R Brancaccio (Italy) A Giannessi
(Norway) V Durasovic (Spain) S Martos Gornés	6^{5}	6	[10]
2	(Mexico) MÁ Reyes-Varela (Spain) D Vega Hernández	7^{7}	4	[7]

Quarterfinals
1	(France) S Doumbia (France) F Reboul	w/o
(France) M Bourgue (France) V Royer
4	(India) S Balaji (Brazil) F Romboli	6	6
(United States) A Lawson (Finland) E Vasa	3	2
(Bulgaria) A Andreev (Spain) N Sánchez Izquierdo	6	4	[9]
(Spain) A Barroso Campos (Spain) P Martínez	3	6	[11]
(Spain) Í Cervantes (Spain) O Roca Batalla	6	6
(Norway) V Durasovic (Spain) S Martos Gornés	4	4

Semifinals
1	(France) S Doumbia (France) F Reboul	4	6^{4}
4	(India) S Balaji (Brazil) F Romboli	6	7^{7}
(Spain) A Barroso Campos (Spain) P Martínez	6	3	[10]
(Spain) Í Cervantes (Spain) O Roca Batalla	3	6	[5]

Final
4	(India) S Balaji (Brazil) F Romboli	6	6^{5}	[9]
(Spain) A Barroso Campos (Spain) P Martínez	3	7^{7}	[11]
