= 2024 Brazzaville Challenger =

- Date: 28 October – 3 November
- Edition: 1st
- Surface: Clay
- Location: Brazzaville, Republic of the Congo

Champions

Singles
- (Venezuela) Gonzalo Oliveira

Doubles
- (France) Florent Bax / (India) Karan Singh
Brazzaville Challenger	· 2025 →

The 2024 Brazzaville Challenger was a professional tennis tournament played on clay courts. It was the 1st edition of the tournament which was part of the 2024 ATP Challenger Tour. It took place in Brazzaville, Republic of the Congo between 28 October and 3 November 2024.

== Singles main-draw entrants ==
=== Seeds ===
Country	Player	Rank^{1}	Seed
ROU	Filip Cristian Jianu	213	1
ARG	Santiago Rodríguez Taverna	218	2
FRA	Calvin Hemery	223	3
VEN	Gonzalo Oliveira	277	4
FRA	Corentin Denolly	306	5
ZIM	Benjamin Lock	344	6
CIV	Eliakim Coulibaly	406	7
FRA	Florent Bax	502	8

- ^{1} Rankings are as of 21 October 2024.

=== Other entrants ===
The following players received wildcards into the singles main draw:

- (Romania) Filip Cristian Jianu
- (United States) Dhruva Mulye

The following player received entry into the singles main draw using a protected ranking:

- (Zimbabwe) Courtney John Lock

The following players received entry into the singles main draw as alternates:

- (Algeria) Samir Hamza Reguig
- (India) Dev Javia

The following players received entry from the qualifying draw:

- (Australia) Lawrence Bataljin
- (Romania) Dragoș Nicolae Cazacu
- (Italy) Matteo Covato
- (France) Julien De Cuyper
- (India) Yuvan Nandal
- (Hong Kong) Yam Chun-ming

== Champions ==
=== Singles ===
- (Venezuela) Gonzalo Oliveira def. (Romania) Filip Cristian Jianu 6–4, 6–3.

=== Doubles ===
- (France) Florent Bax / (India) Karan Singh def. (Italy) Simone Agostini / (South Africa) Alec Beckley 7–5, 6–1.
