= 2024 Ibagué Open =

- Date: 24–29 June
- Edition: 1st
- Surface: Clay
- Location: Ibagué, Colombia

Champions

Singles
- (Ecuador) Álvaro Guillén Meza

Doubles
- (New Zealand) Finn Reynolds / (Chile) Matías Soto
Ibagué Open	· 2025 →

The 2024 Ibagué Open was a professional tennis tournament played on clay courts. It was the first edition of the tournament which was part of the 2024 ATP Challenger Tour. It took place in Ibagué, Colombia between 24 and 29 June 2024.

== Singles main-draw entrants ==
=== Seeds ===
Country	Player	Rank^{1}	Seed
~~AUS~~	~~Bernard Tomic~~	~~250~~	~~1~~
COL	Nicolás Mejía	257	2
LIB	Hady Habib	275	3
ECU	Álvaro Guillén Meza	283	4
ARG	Facundo Mena	295	5
ARG	Renzo Olivo	309	6
BRA	Matheus Pucinelli de Almeida	338	7
CHI	Matías Soto	366	8
ARG	Juan Bautista Torres	381	9

- ^{1} Rankings are as of 17 June 2024.

=== Other entrants ===
The following players received wildcards into the singles main draw:

- (Colombia) Samuel Heredia
- (Colombia) Juan Sebastián Osorio
- (Colombia) Johan Alexander Rodríguez

The following player received entry into the singles main draw as an alternate:

- (Spain) Diego Augusto Barreto Sánchez

The following players received entry from the qualifying draw:

- (Brazil) Mateo Barreiros Reyes
- (United States) Dali Blanch
- (Colombia) Juan Sebastián Gómez
- (Mexico) Alex Hernández
- (Chile) Daniel Antonio Núñez
- (United States) Alexander Stater

The following player received entry as a lucky loser:

- (United States) Noah Schachter

== Champions ==
=== Singles ===
- (Ecuador) Álvaro Guillén Meza def. (Argentina) Facundo Mena 6–0, 6–4.

=== Doubles ===
- (New Zealand) Finn Reynolds / (Chile) Matías Soto def. (Argentina) Leonardo Aboian / (Argentina) Valerio Aboian 6–4, 4–6, [10–7].
