= 2024 Delhi Open – Singles =

Singles
- 2024 Delhi Open

Final
- Champion: (France) Geoffrey Blancaneaux
- Runner-up: (Hong Kong) Coleman Wong
- Score: 6–4, 6–2

Events
Singles	Doubles
- Delhi Open

Stéphane Robert was the defending champion from when the tournament was last held in 2016, but he didn't defend his title after retiring from professional tennis.

Geoffrey Blancaneaux won the title after defeating Coleman Wong 6–4, 6–2 in the final.

== Seeds ==
1. (France) Benjamin Bonzi (second round)
2. (Australia) Adam Walton (second round)
3. (Monaco) Valentin Vacherot (second round, withdrew)
4. (Czech Republic) Dalibor Svrčina (quarterfinals)
5. (United Kingdom) Oliver Crawford (first round)
6. (South Korea) Hong Seong-chan (first round)
7. (Italy) Federico Gaio (second round)
8. (Portugal) Gonçalo Oliveira (second round)

== Draw ==
Key

- Q = Qualifier
- WC = Wild card
- LL = Lucky loser
- Alt = Alternate
- ITF = ITF entry
- PR = Protected ranking
- SR = Special ranking
- SE = Special exempt
- JE = Junior exempt
- JR = Junior Accelerator Programme entrant
- CO = College Accelerator Programme entrant
- NG = Next Gen Accelerator Program entrant
- w/o = Walkover
- r = Retired
- d = Defaulted

=== Finals ===
Semifinals
(Japan) Yuta Shimizu	6^{5}	4
(Hong Kong) Coleman Wong	7^{7}	6
(United States) Tristan Boyer	3	4
(France) Geoffrey Blancaneaux	6	6

Final
(Hong Kong) Coleman Wong	4	2
(France) Geoffrey Blancaneaux	6	6

=== Top half ===
First round
1	(France) B Bonzi	6^{6}	6	6
(France) E Couacaud	7^{8}	2	1
(Japan) Y Shimizu	6	6
(France) M Janvier	3	1
(Italy) E Dalla Valle	6	6
Q	(Indonesia) MR Fitriadi	4	2
WC	(India) K Singh	6	3	4
7	(Italy) F Gaio	3	6	6
3	(Monaco) V Vacherot	6	6^{5}	7^{7}
Q	(Czech Republic) J Forejtek	4	7^{7}	6^{4}
(Hong Kong) C Wong	6	4	7
WC	(India) M Sasikumar	4	6	5
WC	(India) R Ramanathan	3	2
(Australia) T Schoolkate	6	6
(Chinese Taipei) Y-h Hsu	3	6	4
8	(Portugal) G Oliveira	6	2	6

Second round
1	(France) B Bonzi	5	4
(Japan) Y Shimizu	7	6
(Italy) E Dalla Valle	7^{7}	6
7	(Italy) F Gaio	6^{5}	1
3	(Monaco) V Vacherot
(Hong Kong) C Wong	w/o
(Australia) T Schoolkate	6	7^{7}
8	(Portugal) G Oliveira	3	6^{4}

Quarterfinals
(Japan) Y Shimizu	7	7
(Italy) E Dalla Valle	5	5
(Hong Kong) C Wong	7^{12}	6
(Australia) T Schoolkate	6^{10}	3

Semifinals
(Japan) Y Shimizu	6^{5}	4
(Hong Kong) C Wong	7^{7}	6

=== Bottom half ===
First round
6	(South Korea) S-c Hong	3	7^{7}	6^{7}
(United States) T Boyer	6	6^{2}	7^{9}
(Australia) D Sweeny	6^{2}	7	6
(Poland) M Kaśnikowski	7^{7}	5	3
Q	(India) Siddharth Vishwakarma	4	2
Q	(Italy) Samuel Vincent Ruggeri	6	6
(Australia) B Tomic	3	4
4	(Czech Republic) D Svrčina	6	6
5	(United Kingdom) O Crawford	2	6	2
E Donskoy	6	2	6
Q	(Australia) P Sekulic	6	6
(Chinese Taipei) T-l Wu	3	3
Q	(Tunisia) M Echargui	3	6	3
(France) G Blancaneaux	6	2	6
(Belgium) G Onclin	4	0
2	(Australia) A Walton	6	6

Second round
(United States) T Boyer	7	6
(Australia) D Sweeny	5	3
Q	(Italy) S Vincent Ruggeri	5	2
4	(Czech Republic) D Svrčina	7	6
E Donskoy	3	2
Q	(Australia) P Sekulic	6	6
(France) G Blancaneaux	6	6
2	(Australia) A Walton	3	0

Quarterfinals
(United States) T Boyer	7^{7}	7^{7}
4	(Czech Republic) D Svrčina	6^{2}	6^{1}
Q	(Australia) P Sekulic	6^{3}	2
(France) G Blancaneaux	7^{7}	6

Semifinals
(United States) T Boyer	3	4
(France) G Blancaneaux	6	6
