= 2024 Delhi Open =

- Date: 26 February – 3 March
- Edition: 4th
- Category: ATP Challenger Tour
- Surface: Hard
- Location: New Delhi, India

Champions

Singles
- (France) Geoffrey Blancaneaux

Doubles
- (Poland) Piotr Matuszewski / (Australia) Matthew Romios
- Delhi Open

The 2024 Delhi Open was a professional tennis tournament played on outdoor hard courts. It was the fourth edition of the tournament. It was part of the 2024 ATP Challenger Tour. It took place in New Delhi, India from 26 February to 3 March 2024.

== Singles main draw entrants ==
=== Seeds ===
Country	Player	Rank^{1}	Seed
FRA	Benjamin Bonzi	128	1
AUS	Adam Walton	154	2
MON	Valentin Vacherot	173	3
CZE	Dalibor Svrčina	178	4
GBR	Oliver Crawford	191	5
KOR	Hong Seong-chan	194	6
ITA	Federico Gaio	204	7
POR	Gonçalo Oliveira	215	8

- ^{1} Rankings as of 19 February 2024.

=== Other entrants ===
The following players received wildcards into the singles main draw:

- (India) Ramkumar Ramanathan
- (India) Mukund Sasikumar
- (India) Karan Singh

The following players received entry from the qualifying draw:

- (Tunisia) Moez Echargui
- (Indonesia) Muhammad Rifqi Fitriadi
- (Czech Republic) Jonáš Forejtek
- (Australia) Philip Sekulic
- (Italy) Samuel Vincent Ruggeri
- (India) Siddharth Vishwakarma

== Champions ==
=== Singles ===
- (France) Geoffrey Blancaneaux def. (Hong Kong) Coleman Wong 6–4, 6–2.

=== Doubles ===
- (Poland) Piotr Matuszewski / (Australia) Matthew Romios def. (Germany) Jakob Schnaitter / (Germany) Mark Wallner 6–4, 6–4.
