= 2023 Copa Sevilla – Singles =

Singles
- 2023 Copa Sevilla

Final
- Champion: (Spain) Roberto Carballés Baena
- Runner-up: (France) Calvin Hemery
- Score: 6–3, 6–1

Events
Singles	Doubles
← 2022 ·	Copa Sevilla	· 2024 →

Roberto Carballés Baena was the defending champion and successfully defended his title, defeating Calvin Hemery 6–3, 6–1 in the final.

== Seeds ==
1. (Spain) Roberto Carballés Baena (champion)
2. (Argentina) Pedro Cachin (second round)
3. (Spain) Jaume Munar (first round)
4. (Argentina) Facundo Díaz Acosta (second round)
5. (France) Hugo Gaston (semifinals)
6. (Kazakhstan) Timofey Skatov (quarterfinals)
7. (Spain) Pedro Martínez (second round)
8. (Spain) Pablo Llamas Ruiz (quarterfinals)

== Draw ==
=== Key ===
- Q = Qualifier
- WC = Wild card
- LL = Lucky loser
- Alt = Alternate
- SE = Special exempt
- PR = Protected ranking
- ITF = ITF entry
- JE = Junior exempt
- w/o = Walkover
- r = Retired
- d = Defaulted
- SR = Special ranking

=== Finals ===
Semifinals
1	(Spain) Roberto Carballés Baena	6^{2}	7^{9}	6
5	(France) Hugo Gaston	7^{7}	6^{7}	1
Q	(France) Valentin Royer	4	6	3
(France) Calvin Hemery	6	4	6

Final
1	(Spain) Roberto Carballés Baena	6	6
(France) Calvin Hemery	3	1

=== Top half ===
First round
1	(Spain) R Carballés Baena	6	6
Q	(Spain) Í Cervantes	2	1
Q	(Spain) Carlos López Montagud	7^{7}	1	7^{7}
(Spain) O Roca Batalla	6^{3}	6	6^{4}
(Sweden) E Ymer	6^{3}	7	2
(France) M Guinard	7^{7}	5	0^{r}
(France) G Blancaneaux	4	6	5
7	(Spain) P Martínez	6	3	7
3	(Spain) J Munar	7^{7}	3	4
(Italy) A Giannessi	6^{3}	6	6
(France) M Bourgue	4	5
(Spain) D Rincón	6	7
Q	(Spain) Imanol López Morillo	3	2
WC	(Spain) C Taberner	6	6
WC	(Spain) F Verdasco	1	1
5	(France) H Gaston	6	6

Second round
1	(Spain) R Carballés Baena	6	6
Q	(Spain) C López Montagud	2	1
(Sweden) E Ymer	7	6
7	(Spain) P Martínez	5	3
(Italy) A Giannessi	7^{7}	6
(Spain) D Rincón	6^{3}	0
WC	(Spain) C Taberner	1	4
5	(France) H Gaston	6	6

Quarterfinals
1	(Spain) R Carballés Baena	6	6
(Sweden) E Ymer	4	4
(Italy) A Giannessi	6	1	0
5	(France) H Gaston	3	6	6

Semifinals
1	(Spain) R Carballés Baena	6^{2}	7^{9}	6
5	(France) H Gaston	7^{7}	6^{7}	1

=== Bottom half ===
First round
6	(Kazakhstan) T Skatov	6	5	6
(Poland) D Michalski	1	7	3
Q	(Spain) Diego Augusto Barreto Sánchez	4	4
(Kazakhstan) M Kukushkin	6	6
(Argentina) H Casanova	3^{r}
Q	(France) V Royer	3
(Spain) J Barranco Cosano	1	6^{5}
4	(Argentina) F Díaz Acosta	6	7^{7}
8	(Spain) P Llamas Ruiz	6	7^{7}
(Argentina) F Delbonis	4	6^{4}
Q	(Norway) V Durasovic	4	6	4
(Spain) N Sánchez Izquierdo	6	3	6
(Bulgaria) A Andreev	3	6	1
(France) C Hemery	6	1	6
(Italy) R Brancaccio	2	7	3
2/WC	(Argentina) P Cachin	6	5	6

Second round
6	(Kazakhstan) T Skatov	6	4	6
(Kazakhstan) M Kukushkin	2	6	4
Q	(France) V Royer	6	7^{9}
4	(Argentina) F Díaz Acosta	4	6^{7}
8	(Spain) P Llamas Ruiz	6^{7}	6	6
(Spain) N Sánchez Izquierdo	7^{9}	4	4
(France) C Hemery	6	1	7^{7}
2/WC	(Argentina) P Cachin	4	6	6^{3}

Quarterfinals
6	(Kazakhstan) T Skatov	3	2
Q	(France) V Royer	6	6
8	(Spain) P Llamas Ruiz	2	6	3
(France) C Hemery	6	2	6

Semifinals
Q	(France) V Royer	4	6	3
(France) C Hemery	6	4	6
