= 2023 Copa Sevilla =

- Date: 4–9 September
- Edition: 25th
- Surface: Clay
- Location: Seville, Spain

Champions

Singles
- (Spain) Roberto Carballés Baena

Doubles
- (Spain) Alberto Barroso Campos / (Spain) Pedro Martínez
← 2022 ·	Copa Sevilla	· 2024 →

The 2023 Copa Sevilla was a professional tennis tournament played on clay courts. It was the 25th edition of the tournament which was part of the 2023 ATP Challenger Tour. It took place in Seville, Spain between 4 and 9 September 2023.

== Singles main-draw entrants ==
=== Seeds ===
Country	Player	Rank^{1}	Seed
ESP	Roberto Carballés Baena	63	1
ARG	Pedro Cachin	66	2
ESP	Jaume Munar	82	3
ARG	Facundo Díaz Acosta	94	4
FRA	Hugo Gaston	99	5
KAZ	Timofey Skatov	129	6
ESP	Pedro Martínez	132	7
ESP	Pablo Llamas Ruiz	144	8

- ^{1} Rankings are as of 28 August 2023.

=== Other entrants ===
The following players received wildcards into the singles main draw:

- (Argentina) Pedro Cachin
- (Spain) Carlos Taberner
- (Spain) Fernando Verdasco

The following players received entry from the qualifying draw:

- (Spain) Diego Augusto Barreto Sánchez
- (Spain) Íñigo Cervantes
- (Norway) Viktor Durasovic
- (Spain) Carlos López Montagud
- (Spain) Imanol López Morillo
- (France) Valentin Royer

== Champions ==
=== Singles ===
- (Spain) Roberto Carballés Baena def. (France) Calvin Hemery 6–3, 6–1.

=== Doubles ===
- (Spain) Alberto Barroso Campos / (Spain) Pedro Martínez def. (India) Sriram Balaji / (Brazil) Fernando Romboli 3–6, 7–6^{(7–5)}, [11–9].
