= 2024 Delhi Open – Doubles =

Doubles
- 2024 Delhi Open

Final
- Champions: (Poland) Piotr Matuszewski (Australia) Matthew Romios
- Runners-up: (Germany) Jakob Schnaitter (Germany) Mark Wallner
- Score: 6–4, 6–4

Events
Singles	Doubles
- Delhi Open

Yuki Bhambri and Mahesh Bhupathi were the defending champions from when the tournament was last held in 2016, but they didn't defend their title as Bhambri chose not to participate and Bhupathi retired from professional tennis.

Piotr Matuszewski and Matthew Romios won the title after defeating Jakob Schnaitter and Mark Wallner 6–4, 6–4 in the final.

== Seeds ==
1. (India) Saketh Myneni / (India) Ramkumar Ramanathan (first round)
2. (India) Arjun Kadhe / (India) Jeevan Nedunchezhiyan (quarterfinals)
3. (Poland) Piotr Matuszewski / (Australia) Matthew Romios (champions)
4. (Japan) Toshihide Matsui / (Japan) Kaito Uesugi (quarterfinals)

== Draw ==
Key

- Q = Qualifier
- WC = Wild card
- LL = Lucky loser
- Alt = Alternate
- ITF = ITF entry
- PR = Protected ranking
- SR = Special ranking
- SE = Special exempt
- JE = Junior exempt
- JR = Junior Accelerator Programme entrant
- CO = College Accelerator Programme entrant
- NG = Next Gen Accelerator Program entrant
- w/o = Walkover
- r = Retired
- d = Defaulted

First round
1	(India) S Myneni (India) R Ramanathan	4	4
(Germany) J Schnaitter (Germany) M Wallner	6	6
4	(Japan) T Matsui (Japan) K Uesugi	6	6
WC	(India) Parth Aggarwal (India) Sidharth Rawat	2	1
(Chinese Taipei) R Ho (Australia) C Puttergill	7	6
(Philippines) FC Alcantara (Japan) Y Shimizu	5	4
(India) RC Bollipalli (India) N Kaliyanda Poonacha	6^{5}	6	[9]
Alt	(Indonesia) MR Fitriadi (Japan) Ryuki Matsuda	7^{7}	4	[11]
(Italy) E Dalla Valle (Portugal) G Oliveira
3	(Poland) P Matuszewski (Australia) MC Romios	w/o
(Chinese Taipei) Y-h Hsu (Hong Kong) C Wong	6^{3}	7	[6]
(France) C Bittoun Kouzmine (France) M Janvier	7^{7}	5	[10]
PR	(South Korea) S-c Hong (South Korea) S-w Kwon	6^{5}	3
2	(India) A Kadhe (India) J Nedunchezhiyan	7^{7}	6

Quarterfinals
(Germany) J Schnaitter (Germany) M Wallner	6	6
WC	(India) Nitin Kumar Sinha (India) Manish Sureshkumar	4	4
4	(Japan) T Matsui (Japan) K Uesugi	4	3
(Chinese Taipei) R Ho (Australia) C Puttergill	6	6
Alt	(Indonesia) MR Fitriadi (Japan) R Matsuda	4	5
3	(Poland) P Matuszewski (Australia) MC Romios	6	7
(France) C Bittoun Kouzmine (France) M Janvier	7^{7}	6^{4}	[10]
2	(India) A Kadhe (India) J Nedunchezhiyan	6^{4}	7^{7}	[6]

Semifinals
(Germany) J Schnaitter (Germany) M Wallner	3	7^{8}	[10]
(Chinese Taipei) R Ho (Australia) C Puttergill	6	6^{6}	[5]
3	(Poland) P Matuszewski (Australia) MC Romios	7^{7}	6
(France) C Bittoun Kouzmine (France) M Janvier	6^{4}	1

Final
(Germany) J Schnaitter (Germany) M Wallner	4	4
3	(Poland) P Matuszewski (Australia) MC Romios	6	6
