= 2026 Brazzaville Challenger =

- Date: 4 – 10 May
- Edition: 3rd
- Surface: Clay
- Location: Brazzaville, Republic of the Congo

Champions

Singles
- (France) Calvin Hemery

Doubles
- (Venezuela) Brandon Pérez / (Argentina) Franco Ribero
- Brazzaville Challenger

The 2026 Brazzaville Challenger was a professional tennis tournament played on clay courts. It was the third edition of the tournament which was part of the 2026 ATP Challenger Tour. It took place in Brazzaville, Republic of the Congo between 4 and 10 May 2026.

== Singles main-draw entrants ==
=== Seeds ===
Country	Player	Rank^{1}	Seed
FRA	Florent Bax	265	1
~~CIV~~	~~Eliakim Coulibaly~~	~~275~~	~~2~~
BEL	Michael Geerts	292	3
JAM	Blaise Bicknell	334	4
FRA	Calvin Hemery	354	5
FRA	Mathys Erhard	411	6
IND	Karan Singh	420	7
SLO	Bor Artnak	438	8
ESP	Iván Marrero Curbelo	495	9

- ^{1} Rankings are as of 20 April 2026.

=== Other entrants ===
The following players received wildcards into the singles main draw:

- (France) Mathys Erhard
- (Belgium) Michael Geerts

The following players received entry into the singles main draw as alternates:

- (Australia) Lawrence Bataljin
- (Tunisia) Aziz Dougaz
- (Venezuela) Brandon Pérez
- (United States) Gray Voelzke

The following players received entry from the qualifying draw:

- (India) Parth Aggarwal
- (Australia) Adrian Arcon
- (Democratic Republic of the Congo) Bienvenu Bolangi
- (Brazil) Luís Britto
- (Zimbabwe) Courtney John Lock
- (Antigua and Barbuda) Jody Maginley

== Champions ==
=== Singles ===
- (France) Calvin Hemery def. (France) Florent Bax 7–5, 3–6, 7–6^{(7–2)}.

=== Doubles ===
- (Venezuela) Brandon Pérez / (Argentina) Franco Ribero def. (Belgium) Michael Geerts / (Tunisia) Skander Mansouri 6–3, 6–4.
