= Ibagué Open =

Defunct tennis tournament
- Location: Ibagué, Colombia
- Venue: Complejo de Raquetas del Parque Deportivo
- Category: ATP Challenger Tour
- Surface: Clay
- Website: website

The Ibagué Open was a professional tennis tournament played on clay courts. It was part of the ATP Challenger Tour. It was held in Ibagué, Colombia in 2024.

== Past finals ==
=== Singles ===
Year	Champion	Runner-up	Score
2024	(Ecuador) Álvaro Guillén Meza	(Argentina) Facundo Mena	6–0, 6–4

=== Doubles ===
Year	Champions	Runners-up	Score
2024	(New Zealand) Finn Reynolds (Chile) Matías Soto	(Argentina) Leonardo Aboian (Argentina) Valerio Aboian	6–4, 4–6, [10–7]
