= Filip Cristian Jianu =

Romanian tennis player

Filip Jianu
- Jianu at the 2026 Wimbledon Championships
- Full name: Filip Cristian Jianu
- Country (sports): Romania
- Born: 18 September 2001 (age 25) Bucharest, Romania
- Height: 1.80 m (5 ft 11 in)
- Plays: Right-handed (two-handed backhand)
- Prize money: US $466,268

Singles
- Career record: 4–5
- Career titles: 0
- Highest ranking: No. 210 (9 June 2025)
- Current ranking: No. 286 (19 October 2026)

Grand Slam singles results
- Australian Open: Q1 (2025)
- French Open: Q3 (2025)
- Wimbledon: Q1 (2025, 2026)

Doubles
- Career record: 0–1
- Career titles: 0
- Highest ranking: No. 451 (10 April 2023)
- Current ranking: No. 1,015 (19 October 2026)
- Last updated on: 19 October 2026.

Filip Cristian Jianu (born 18 September 2001) is a Romanian professional tennis player. He has a career-high ATP singles ranking of No. 210 achieved on 9 June 2025 and a best doubles ranking of No. 451 reached on 10 April 2023. He is currently the No. 1 singles player from Romania.

Jianu represents Romania at the Davis Cup.

== Juniors ==
Jianu had good results as a junior player. He reached an ITF junior combined ranking of world No. 5 on 4 February 2019.

== Professional career ==
In November 2024, Jianu reached his second singles final for the season at the 2024 Brazzaville Challenger, where he lost to Gonzalo Oliveira.

In March 2025, Jianu received a wildcard for his home tournament, the 2025 Țiriac Open, and recorded his first ATP Tour win (outside of the Davis Cup) over Nishesh Basavareddy in straight sets. He lost to Damir Džumhur in three sets.

== ATP Challenger Tour finals ==
=== Singles: 3 (3 runner-ups) ===
Legend ATP Challenger Tour (0–3)

Result	W–L	Date	Tournament	Tier	Surface	Opponent	Score
Loss	0–1	Jan 2023	Oeiras Indoors, Portugal	Challenger	Hard (i)	(Belgium) Joris De Loore	3–6, 2–6
Loss	0–2	Jun 2024	Aspria Tennis Cup, Italy	Challenger	Clay	(Argentina) Federico Agustín Gómez	3–6, 4–6
Loss	0–3	Oct 2024	Brazzaville Challenger, Republic of the Congo	Challenger	Clay	(Venezuela) Gonzalo Oliveira	4–6, 3–6

== ITF World Tennis Tour finals ==
=== Singles: 26 (16 titles, 10 runner-ups) ===
Legend ITF WTT (16–10)	Finals by surface Hard (2–0) Clay (14–10)

Result	W–L	Date	Tournament	Tier	Surface	Opponent	Score
Win	1–0	May 2019	M15 Tabarka, Tunisia	WTT	Clay	(France) Matthieu Perchicot	6–2, 6–4
Loss	1–1	Aug 2019	M15 Tabarka, Tunisia	WTT	Clay	(France) Matthieu Perchicot	2–6, 6–3, 0–6
Win	2–1	Aug 2019	M25 Pitești, Romania	WTT	Clay	(Serbia) Marko Tepavac	7–6^{(7–4)}, 5–0 ret.
Loss	2–2	Sep 2019	M15 Tabarka, Tunisia	WTT	Clay	(Argentina) Ignacio Monzón	1–6, 2–6
Win	3–2	Mar 2020	M15 Heraklion, Greece	WTT	Hard	(Monaco) Lucas Catarina	7–5, 3–6, 6–3
Loss	3–3	Jan 2021	M15 Cairo, Egypt	WTT	Clay	(Italy) Franco Agamenone	6–7^{(0–7)}, 4–6
Loss	3–4	Feb 2021	M15 Antalya, Turkey	WTT	Clay	(Argentina) Agustín Velotti	3–6, 4–6
Win	4–4	Nov 2021	M15 Heraklion, Greece	WTT	Hard	(Sweden) Filip Bergevi	6–2, 6–4
Win	5–4	Dec 2022	M15 Antalya, Turkey	WTT	Clay	(Montenegro) Rrezart Cungu	6–2, 6–4
Loss	5–5	May 2023	M15 Alaminos-Larnaca, Cyprus	WTT	Clay	(Romania) Nicholas David Ionel	3–6, 6–7^{(2–7)}
Win	6–5	May 2023	M15 Alaminos-Larnaca, Cyprus	WTT	Clay	(Germany) Sebastian Prechtel	5–7, 6–3, 6–2
Loss	6–6	Sep 2023	M15 Pirot, Serbia	WTT	Clay	(Romania) Vlad Dancu	5–7, 6–2, 3–6
Win	7–6	Oct 2023	M15 Telavi, Georgia	WTT	Clay	Svyatoslav Gulin	6–2, 6–0
Win	8–6	Nov 2023	M15 Antalya, Turkey	WTT	Clay	(Italy) Gabriele Pennaforti	6–3, 6–2
Win	9–6	Jan 2024	M15 Antalya, Turkey	WTT	Clay	(Germany) Peter Heller	7–6^{(7–5)}, 6–4
Loss	9–7	Jan 2024	M15 Antalya, Turkey	WTT	Clay	(Spain) Carlos Gimeno Valero	3–6, 4–6
Loss	9–8	Feb 2024	M25 Hammamet, Tunisia	WTT	Clay	(Spain) Pol Martín Tiffon	3–6, 3–6
Win	10–8	Feb 2024	M15 Kish Island, Iran	WTT	Clay	(Serbia) Branko Djuric	7–5, 6–4
Win	11–8	Mar 2024	M15 Kish Island, Iran	WTT	Clay	(Hungary) Gergely Madarász	6–2, 6–3
Win	12–8	Mar 2024	M15 Antalya, Turkey	WTT	Clay	(Austria) Joel Schwärzler	6–1, 6–2
Win	13–8	Sep 2024	M25 Satu Mare, Romania	WTT	Clay	(Portugal) Frederico Ferreira Silva	6–4, 6–3
Loss	13–9	Nov 2024	M15 Antalya, Turkey	WTT	Clay	Evgenii Tiurnev	1–6, 7–6^{(7–4)}, 5–7
Win	14–9	Nov 2025	M15 Antalya, Turkey	WTT	Clay	Bekkhan Atlangeriev	6–1, 6–1
Loss	14–10	Jan 2026	M15 Antalya, Turkey	WTT	Clay	(United Kingdom) Felix Gill	2–6, 6–1, 2–6
Win	15–10	Jan 2026	M25 Antalya, Turkey	WTT	Clay	(Serbia) Dusan Obradovic	6–1, 6–1
Win	16–10	Feb 2026	M15 Antalya, Turkey	WTT	Clay	(Japan) Akira Santillan	6–3, 2–0 ret.
