= Franco Ribero =

Argentine tennis player (born 1999)

- Country (sports): Argentina
- Born: 9 September 1999 (age 27) Humboldt, Argentina
- Height: 1.88 m (6 ft 2 in)
- Plays: Right-handed (two-handed backhand)
- College: Texas Tech
- Coach: Javier Vittar
- Prize money: US $66,887

Singles
- Career record: 0–0 (at ATP Tour level, Grand Slam level, and in Davis Cup)
- Career titles: 1 ITF
- Highest ranking: No. 654 (17 February 2025)
- Current ranking: No. 706 (19 October 2026)

Doubles
- Career record: 0–0 (at ATP Tour level, Grand Slam level, and in Davis Cup)
- Career titles: 1 Challenger, 3 ITF
- Highest ranking: No. 197 (19 October 2026)
- Current ranking: No. 197 (19 October 2026)
- Last updated on: 19 October 2026.

Franco Ribero (born 9 September 1999) is an Argentine tennis player. Ribero has a career high ATP singles ranking of No. 654 achieved on 17 February 2025 and a career high ATP doubles ranking of No. 197 achieved on 19 October 2026.

Ribero has won one ATP Challenger doubles title at the 2026 Brazzaville Challenger.

Ribero played college tennis at Texas Tech.
