= Maxime Chazal =

French tennis player

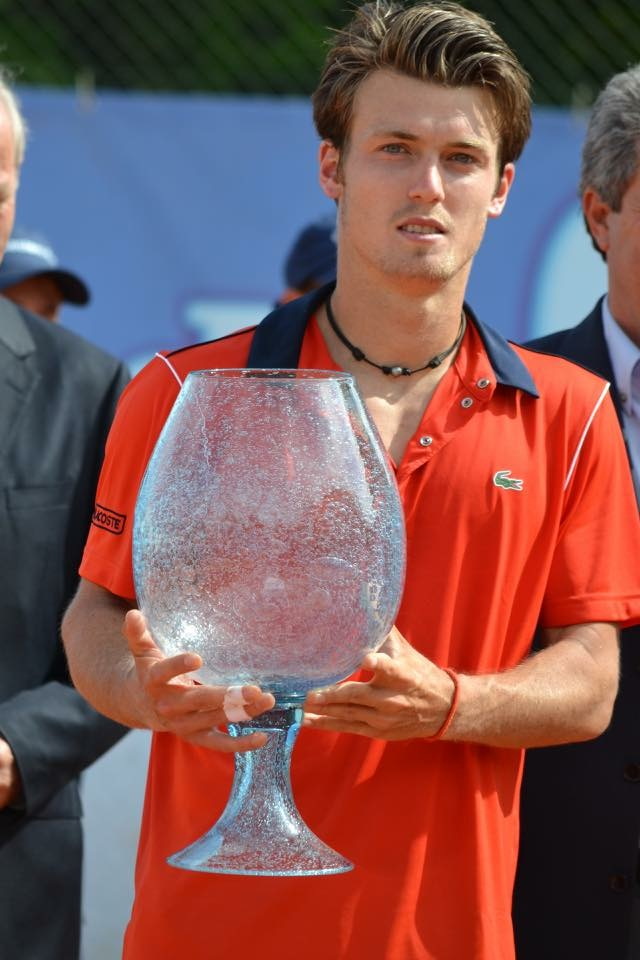
- Full name: Maxime Chazal
- Country (sports): France
- Residence: Aix-en-Provence, France
- Born: 24 April 1993 (age 33) Nouméa, New Caledonia, France
- Height: 1.75 m (5 ft 9 in)
- Turned pro: 2010
- Plays: Right-handed (one-handed backhand)
- Coach: Florian Reynet, Rodolphe Cadart
- Prize money: US $266,836

Singles
- Career record: 0–0 (at ATP Tour level, Grand Slam level, and in Davis Cup)
- Career titles: 0
- Highest ranking: No. 234 (7 March 2016)
- Current ranking: No. 469 (10 August 2026)

Grand Slam singles results
- Australian Open: Q1 (2016)
- French Open: Q1 (2016)

Doubles
- Career record: 1–2 (at ATP Tour level, Grand Slam level, and in Davis Cup)
- Career titles: 0
- Highest ranking: No. 347 (19 February 2018)
- Current ranking: No. 1,802 (10 August 2026)
- Last updated on: 21 August 2026.

Maxime Chazal (born 24 April 1993) is a French tennis player. He has a career high ATP singles ranking of world No. 234 achieved on 7 March 2016 and a doubles ranking of No. 347 achieved on 19 February 2018.

== Professional career ==
=== 2013: ATP Tour doubles debut ===
In February, Chazal made his ATP main draw doubles debut in Marseille, partnering with Martin Vaïsse. The pair lost in the first round.

=== 2014: ATP Tour qualifying debut ===
In January, Chazal won his first ATP singles qualifying debut in Auckland, defeating Ross Hutchins in the first round and losing to Steve Johnson in the final round.

=== 2016: Grand Slam qualifying debut ===
In January, Chazal made his Grand Slam debut at the Australian Open, losing in the first qualifying round to fellow countryman Maxime Janvier. In May, he made his debut at the French Open, also losing in the first qualifying round.

=== 2017: Maiden ATP Tour doubles win ===
In February, Chazal won his first match on the ATP main draw doubles in Marseille, partnering with David Guez. The pair reached the quarterfinal where they lost to Nick Kyrgios and Matt Reid.

=== 2025: Maiden Challenger doubles final ===
In February, Chazal reached his first Challenger doubles final in Brazzaville, partnering with Geoffrey Blancaneaux. The pair lost to top seed Mateo Barreiros Reyes and Paulo André Saraiva dos Santos in the final.

== Performance timeline ==
Tournament	2016	2017	2018	2019	2020	2021	2022	2023	2024	2025	SR	W–L	Win%
Grand Slam tournaments
Australian Open	Q1	A	A	A	A	A	A	A	A	A	0 / 0	0–0	–
French Open	Q1	A	A	A	A	A	A	A	A	A	0 / 0	0–0	–
Wimbledon	A	A	A	A	A	A	A	A	A	A	0 / 0	0–0	–
US Open	A	A	A	A	A	A	A	A	A	A	0 / 0	0–0	–
Win–loss	0–0	0–0	0–0	0–0	0–0	0–0	0–0	0–0	0–0	0–0	0 / 0	0–0	–

== ATP Challenger and ITF Tour finals ==
=== Singles: 38 (16 titles, 22 runner-ups) ===
Legend ITF Futures/WTT (16–22)	Finals by surface Hard (1–1) Clay (15–21) Grass (0–0) Carpet (0–0)

Result	W–L	Date	Tournament	Tier	Surface	Opponent	Score
Loss	0–1	May 2013	Romania F1	Futures	Clay	(Poland) Piotr Gadomski	4–6, 2–6
Win	1–1	Jul 2013	Serbia F4	Futures	Clay	(Serbia) Peđa Krstin	6–4, 6–3
Win	2–1	Sep 2013	Italy F27	Futures	Clay	(Italy) Enrico Burzi	7–5, 2–6, 6–4
Loss	2–2	Mar 2014	Italy F4	Futures	Clay	(Italy) Simone Vagnozzi	3–6, 2–6
Win	3–2	Apr 2015	France F9, Grasse	Futures	Clay	(Monaco) Romain Arneodo	6–2, 7–5
Win	4–2	May 2015	Spain F14, Vic	Futures	Clay	(United Kingdom) Alexander Ward	6–7^{(7–9)}, 7–6^{(7–4)}, 6–2
Win	5–2	Jun 2015	Spain F15, Madrid	Futures	Clay	(Spain) Albert Alcaraz Ivorra	7–6^{(7–4)}, 6–4
Win	6–2	Jun 2015	Romania F5, Cluj-Napoca	Futures	Clay	(Romania) Teodor-Dacian Craciun	6–2, 7–5
Loss	6–3	Jul 2015	France F14, Saint-Gervais-les-Bains	Futures	Clay	(France) Jonathan Eysseric	6–3, 1–6, 4–6
Win	7–3	Jul 2015	Serbia F6, Belgrade	Futures	Clay	(Serbia) Miki Janković	6–2, 2–6, 7–6^{(7–4)}
Loss	7–4	Jul 2015	Austria F6, Wels	Futures	Clay	(Slovenia) Tom Kocevar-Desman	2–6, 4–6
Loss	7–5	Nov 2015	Morocco F4, Casablanca	Futures	Clay	(Italy) Stefano Travaglia	4–6, 4–6
Win	8–5	Jul 2016	Belgium F7, Duinbergen	Futures	Clay	(Switzerland) Sandro Ehrat	7–5, 2–6, 6–2
Win	9–5	Aug 2016	Italy F25, Padova	Futures	Clay	(Austria) Michael Linzer	6–4, 6–7^{(10–12)}, 7–5
Loss	9–6	Oct 2016	Italy F34, Santa Margherita di Pula	Futures	Clay	(Germany) Marvin Netuschil	4–6, 4–6
Loss	9–7	Apr 2017	Portugal F7, Carcavelos	Futures	Clay	(Portugal) João Domingues	3–6, 1–6
Loss	9–8	Jun 2017	Netherlands F1, Alkmaar	Futures	Clay	(Netherlands) Thiemo de Bakker	3–6, 5–7
Loss	9–9	Jan 2018	USA F6, Palm Coast	Futures	Clay	(Netherlands) Tim van Rijthoven	4–6, 4–6
Loss	9–10	Jul 2018	Belgium F6, Brussels	Futures	Clay	(France) Jules Marie	5–7, 6–7^{(3–7)}
Loss	9–11	Mar 2019	M15 Poreč, Croatia	WTT	Clay	(Italy) Andrea Pellegrino	3–6, 7–5, 4–6
Win	10–11	May 2019	M25 Vercelli, Italy	WTT	Clay	(France) Corentin Denolly	2–6, 6–4, 7–5
Win	11–11	May 2019	M25 Most, Czechia	WTT	Clay	(Czech Republic) Jan Šátral	5–7, 7–6^{(8–6)}, 7–5
Loss	11–12	Sep 2019	M25 Jounieh, Lebanon	WTT	Clay	(Croatia) Matija Pecotić	1–6, 6–4, 2–6
Loss	11–13	Oct 2021	M15 Platja D’Aro, Spain	WTT	Clay	(Spain) Carlos Sánchez Jover	3–6, 3–6
Loss	11–14	Aug 2022	M15 Frederiksberg, Denmark	WTT	Clay	(Sweden) Karl Friberg	7–6^{(7–4)}, 3–6, 3–6
Loss	11–15	Oct 2022	M15 Antalya, Turkey	WTT	Clay	(Italy) Alexander Weis	4–6, 4–6
Loss	11–16	Apr 2023	M25 Angers, France	WTT	Clay (i)	(France) Clément Tabur	4–6, 3–6
Loss	11–17	May 2023	M25 Sabadell, Spain	WTT	Clay	(France) Mathias Bourgue	6–7^{(5–7)}, 4–6
Loss	11–18	Jun 2023	M25 Grasse, France	WTT	Clay	(France) Titouan Droguet	1–6, 5–7
Win	12–18	Apr 2024	M15 Dubrovnik, Croatia	WTT	Clay	(Austria) Neil Oberleitner	6–2, 6–4
Loss	12–19	May 2024	M25 Carnac, France	WTT	Clay	(Argentina) Federico Agustin Gomez	4–6, 0–6
Win	13–19	Jun 2024	M25 Grasse, France	WTT	Clay	(Italy) Federico Gaio	4–6, 6–4, 6–2
Win	14–19	Jun 2024	M25 Montauban, France	WTT	Clay	(France) Arthur Reymond	6–4, 6–2
Loss	14–20	Jul 2024	M25 Uriage-les-Bains, France	WTT	Clay	(France) Gabriel Debru	1–6, 3–6
Loss	14–21	Jul 2024	M25 Wetzlar, Germany	WTT	Clay	(Netherlands) Max Houkes	4–6, 5–7
Win	15–21	Aug 2025	M15 Cap d'Agde, France	WTT	Clay	(France) Florent Bax	5–7, 6–2, 6–2
Win	16–21	Feb 2026	M25 Monastir, Tunisia	WTT	Hard	(Italy) Massimo Giunta	7–6^{(7–2)}, 6–2
Loss	16–22	May 2026	M15 Monastir, Tunisia	WTT	Hard	(Australia) Jacob Bradshaw	2–6, 6–7^{(4–7)}

=== Doubles: 0 (0–1) ===
Legend ATP Challenger (0–1)	Finals by surface Hard (0–0) Clay (0–1) Grass (0–0) Carpet (0–0)

Result	W–L	Date	Tournament	Tier	Surface	Partner	Opponents	Score
Loss	0-1	Feb 2025	Brazzaville, Republic of Congo	Challenger	Clay	(France) Geoffrey Blancaneaux	(Brazil) Mateo Barreiros Reyes (Brazil) Paulo Andre Saraiva Dos Santos	4-6, 6-1, [6-10]
