= Florent Bax =

French tennis player (born 1999)

- Bax at the 2026 Wimbledon Championships
- Country (sports): France
- Born: 16 June 1999 (age 27) Réunion, France
- Height: 1.85 m (6 ft 1 in)
- Plays: Right-handed (two-handed backhand)
- Coach: Julien Gillet
- Prize money: US $205,080

Singles
- Career record: 0–0
- Career titles: 5 ITF
- Highest ranking: No. 247 (27 July 2026)
- Current ranking: No. 292 (9 November 2026)

Grand Slam singles results
- French Open: Q1 (2026)
- Wimbledon: Q1 (2026)

Doubles
- Career record: 0–0
- Career titles: 1 Challenger, 3 ITF
- Highest ranking: No. 419 (7 April 2025)
- Current ranking: No. 818 (9 November 2026)
- Last updated on: 9 November 2026.

Florent Bax (born 16 June 1999) is a French tennis player who competes mainly on the Challenger and ITF tours. Bax has a career high ATP singles ranking of world No. 247 achieved on 27 July 2026 and a career high ATP doubles ranking of No. 419 achieved on 7 April 2025.

== Career ==
=== 2024: Maiden Challenger doubles title, top 500 ===
In November, Bax won his maiden Challenger doubles title at the 2024 Brazzaville Challenger, pairing with Karan Singh.

=== 2025: Top 400 ===
In April, Bax reached his first Challenger semifinal in Abidjan, as a qualifier, after defeating top seed Aziz Dougaz in the second round. He lost to eventual winner Maximus Jones in the semifinal.

=== 2026: First Challenger final, Top 250 ===
In May, Bax reached his first Challenger final in Brazzaville, losing Calvin Hemery in the final. He entered the top 250 as a result.

== ATP Challenger Tour finals ==
=== Singles: 1 (0 title, 1 runner-up) ===
Legend ATP Challenger (0–1)	Finals by surface Hard (0–0) Clay (0–1)

Result	W–L	Date	Tournament	Tier	Surface	Opponent	Score
Loss	0–1	May 2026	Brazzaville Challenger, Republic of Congo	Challenger	Clay	(France) Calvin Hemery	5–7, 6–3, 6–7^{(2–7)}

== ITF Tour finals ==
=== Singles: 12 (7 titles, 5 runner-ups) ===
Legend ITF Futures (7–5)	Finals by surface Hard (4–1) Clay (3–4)

Result	W–L	Date	Tournament	Tier	Surface	Opponent	Score
Loss	0–1	May 2023	M15 New Delhi, India	World Tennis Tour	Hard	(India) Digvijaypratap Singh	2–6, Ret.
Win	1–1	Mar 2023	M15 Monastir, Tunisia	World Tennis Tour	Hard	(China) Tao Mu	6–2, 6–4
Loss	1–2	May 2023	M15 Constanta, Romania	World Tennis Tour	Clay	(Denmark) Elmer Moller	6–3, 0–6, 1–6
Win	2–2	Oct 2023	M15 Ahmedabad, India	World Tennis Tour	Hard	(India) Ishaque Eqbal	6–3, 7–5
Loss	2–3	Sep 2024	M25 Kigali, Rwanda	World Tennis Tour	Clay	(France) Corentin Denolly	3–6, 6–7^{(3–7)}
Win	3–3	Mar 2025	M15 Monastir, Tunisia	World Tennis Tour	Hard	(Czech Republic) Maxim Mrva	6–0, 6–3
Loss	3–4	May 2025	M25 Santa Margherita di Pula, Italy	World Tennis Tour	Clay	Ivan Gakhov	1–6, 2–6
Win	4–4	Aug 2025	M25 Brazzaville, Congo	World Tennis Tour	Clay	(Slovenia) Bor Artnak	6–3, 6–3
Win	5–4	Aug 2025	M25 Brazzaville, Congo	World Tennis Tour	Clay	(Slovenia) Bor Artnak	6–3, 6–7^{(5–7)}, 7–6^{(8–6)}
Loss	5–5	Aug 2025	M15 Cap d'Agde, France	World Tennis Tour	Clay	(France) Maxime Chazal	7–5, 2–6, 2–6
Win	6–5	Nov 2025	M25 Luanda, Angola	World Tennis Tour	Hard	(Netherlands) Max Houkes	7–6^{(7–3)}, 6–3
Win	7–5	Nov 2025	M25 Santa Margherita di Pula, Italy	World Tennis Tour	Clay	(Germany) Max Schönhaus	4–6, 6–4, 6–2

=== Doubles: 11 (6 titles, 5 runner-ups) ===
Legend ATP Challenger (1–0) ITF Futures (5–5)	Finals by surface Hard (2–3) Clay (4–2)

Result	W–L	Date	Tournament	Tier	Surface	Partner	Opponents	Score
Loss	0-1	Jan 2022	M25 Monastir, Tunisia	World Tennis Tour	Hard	(France) Robin Bertrand	(Tunisia) Skander Mansouri (Germany) Marko Topo	4–6, 5–7
Loss	0-2	Mar 2022	M15 Marrakech, Morocco	World Tennis Tour	Clay	(France) Arthur Weber	(Austria) Philip Bachmaier (Russia) Ilya Rudiukov	7–5, 6–7^{(2–7)}, [10–12]
Win	1-2	Jan 2023	M15 Monastir, Tunisia	World Tennis Tour	Hard	(France) Arthur Bouquier	(Italy) Manuel Mazza (Italy) Andrea Picchione	7–5, 6–3
Loss	1-3	Jul 2023	M15 Novi Sad, Serbia	World Tennis Tour	Hard	(France) Louis Tessa	(Argentina) Valerio Aboian (Argentina) Leonardo Aboian	6–7^{(5–7)}, 4–6
Loss	1-4	Apr 2024	M15 Monastir, Tunisia	World Tennis Tour	Hard	(France) Maxence Beauge	(Russia) Petr Bar Biryukov (Russia) Ilia Simakin	6–7^{(5–7)}, 6–7^{(3–7)}
Win	2-4	Apr 2024	M15 Uriage, France	World Tennis Tour	Clay	(Belgium) Simon Beaupain	(Romania) Alexandru Dumitru (Romania) Mihai Marinescu	6–2, 6–4
Win	3-4	Jul 2024	M25 Uriage, France	World Tennis Tour	Clay	(France) Alexandre Aubriot	(France) Gabriel Debru (France) Tiago Pires	6–3, 2–6, [10-5]
Win	4-4	Oct 2024	Brazzaville, Congo	Challenger	Clay	(India) Karan Singh	(Italy) Simone Agostini (South Africa) Alec Beckley	7–5, 6–1
Win	5-4	Mar 2025	M15 Monastir, Tunisia	World Tennis Tour	Hard	(Czech Republic) Lukáš Pokorný	(Czech Republic) Matthew William Donald (Greece) Dimitris Sakellaridis	6–4, 6–4
Loss	5-5	Jun 2025	M25 Montauban, France	World Tennis Tour	Clay	(France) Benjamin Pietri	(France) Arthur Reymond (France) Axel Garcian	2–6, 6–4, [4-10]
Win	6-5	Jul 2025	M25 Brazzaville, Congo	World Tennis Tour	Clay	(France) Paul Inchauspe	(Republic of the Congo) Seydina Andre (France) Nicolas Jadoun	6–2, 6–1
