= Paterne Mamata =

French tennis player

- Country (sports): France
- Born: 16 July 1986 (age 38)
- Prize money: $12,250

Singles
- Career record: 0–0 (at ATP Tour level, Grand Slam level, and in Davis Cup)
- Career titles: 0 ITF
- Highest ranking: No. 879 (15 August 2011)

Doubles
- Career record: 0–2 (at ATP Tour level, Grand Slam level, and in Davis Cup)
- Career titles: 1 ITF
- Highest ranking: No. 828 (10 September 2012)
- Last updated on: 28 November 2016.

Paterne Mamata (born 16 July 1986) is a retired French tennis player.

Mamata has a career high ATP singles ranking of 879 achieved on 15 August 2011. He also has a career high ATP doubles ranking of 828 achieved on 10 September 2012.

Mamata made his ATP main draw debut at the 2010 Open 13 in the doubles draw partnering Gaël Monfils. Mamata represents the Republic of the Congo at the Davis Cup.
