= Paulo André Saraiva dos Santos =

Brazilian tennis player (born 2000)

- Country (sports): Brazil
- Born: 23 June 2000 (age 26) Brasília, Brazil
- Height: 1.80 m (5 ft 11 in)
- Plays: Right-handed (two-handed backhand)
- Coach: Santos Dumont
- Prize money: US $118,750

Singles
- Career record: 0–0 (at ATP Tour level, Grand Slam level, and in Davis Cup)
- Career titles: 0
- Highest ranking: No. 424 (16 November 2026)
- Current ranking: No. 424 (16 November 2026)

Doubles
- Career record: 0–0 (at ATP Tour level, Grand Slam level, and in Davis Cup)
- Career titles: 0; 2 Challenger
- Highest ranking: No. 192 (29 June 2026)
- Current ranking: No. 231 (16 November 2026)
- Last updated on: 16 November 2026.

Paulo André Saraiva dos Santos (born 23 June 2000) is a Brazilian professional tennis player. He has a career-high ATP singles ranking of No. 424 achieved on 16 November 2026 and a best doubles ranking of No. 192 achieved on 29 June 2026.

Saraiva dos Santos has won one ATP Challenger doubles title at the 2025 Brazzaville Challenger, with countryman Mateo Barreiros Reyes.

== ATP Challenger Tour finals ==
=== Doubles: 3 (titles) ===
Legend ATP Challenger Tour (3–0)

Result	W–L	Date	Tournament	Tier	Surface	Partner	Opponents	Score
Win	1–0	Feb 2025	Brazzaville, Republic of the Congo	Challenger	Clay	(Brazil) Mateo Barreiros Reyes	(France) Geoffrey Blancaneaux (France) Maxime Chazal	6–4, 1–6, [10–6]
Win	2–0	Mar 2026	Santiago, Chile	Challenger	Clay	(Italy) Gianluca Cadenasso	(Mexico) Miguel Ángel Reyes-Varela (Bolivia) Federico Zeballos	6–3, 7–5
Win	3–0	Jun 2026	Piracicaba, Brazil	Challenger	Clay	(Brazil) Luís Felipe Miguel	(Peru) Arklon Huertas del Pino (Peru) Conner Huertas del Pino	6–3, 7–6^{(7–0)}

== ITF World Tennis Tour finals ==
=== Singles: 4 (runner–ups) ===
Legend ITF WTT (0–4)

Result	W–L	Date	Tournament	Tier	Surface	Opponent	Score
Loss	0–1	Jun 2025	M15 Monastir, Tunisia	WTT	Hard	(Italy) Filippo Moroni	5–7, 1–6
Loss	0–2	Jul 2025	M25 Villavicencio, Colombia	WTT	Clay	(Colombia) Samuel Alejandro Linde Palacios	1–6, 4–6
Loss	0–3	Jul 2026	M25 São Paulo, Brazil	WTT	Clay	(Brazil) Felipe Meligeni Alves	4–6, 3–6
Loss	0–4	Aug 2026	M25 Londrina, Brazil	WTT	Clay	(Brazil) Felipe Meligeni Alves	3–6, 5–7
