= Geoffrey Blancaneaux =

French tennis player (born 1998)

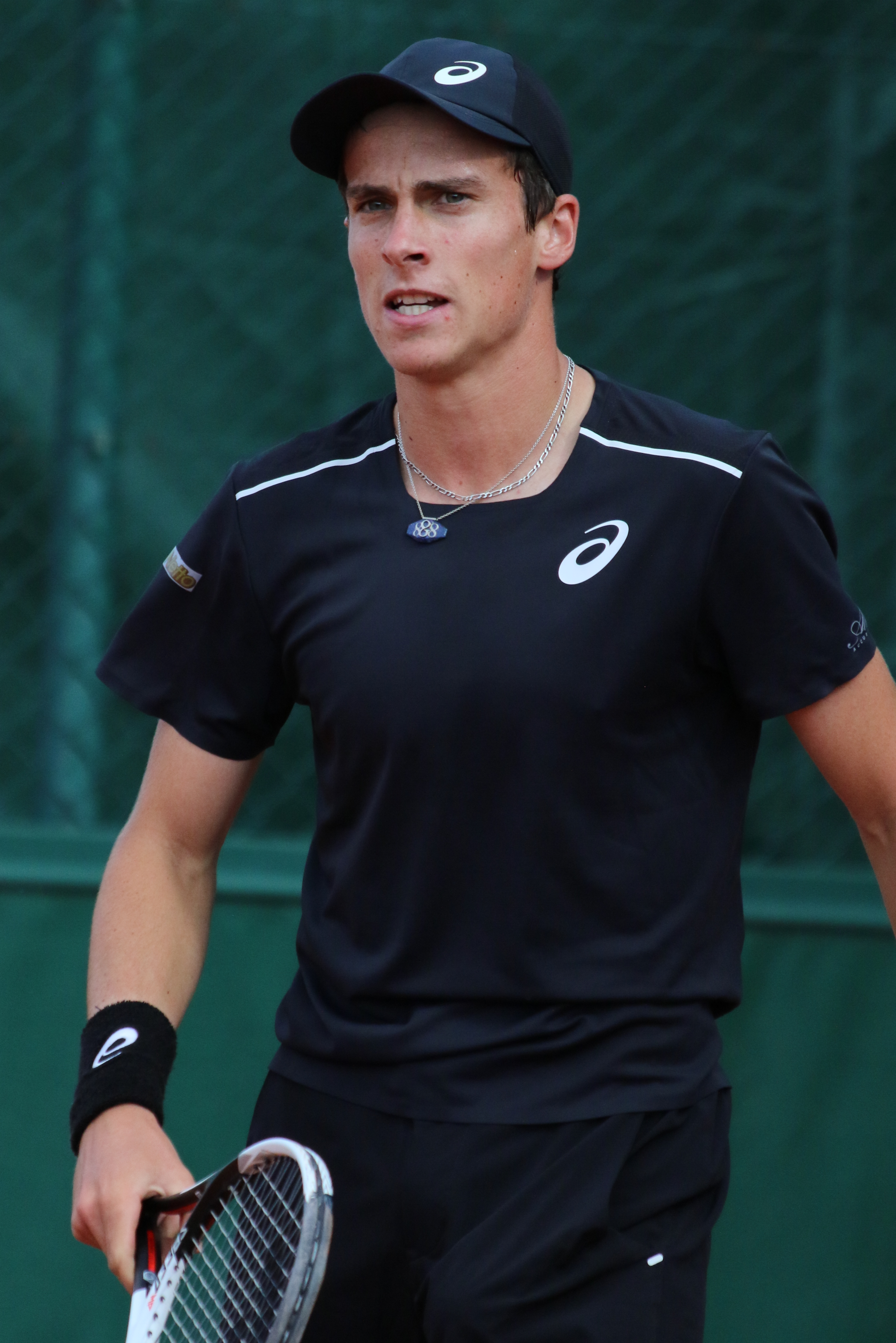
- Blancaneaux at the 2018 French Open
- Country (sports): France
- Residence: Paris, France
- Born: 8 August 1998 (age 28) Paris, France
- Height: 1.80 m (5 ft 11 in)
- Turned pro: 2016
- Plays: Right-handed (two handed-backhand)
- Coach: Maximilien Blancaneaux
- Prize money: US $1,089,215

Singles
- Career record: 0–6
- Career titles: 3 Challengers
- Highest ranking: No. 134 (14 November 2022)
- Current ranking: No. 444 (9 November 2026)

Grand Slam singles results
- Australian Open: Q1 (2022, 2023, 2024)
- French Open: 1R (2022)
- Wimbledon: Q1 (2022, 2023)
- US Open: 1R (2017)

Doubles
- Career record: 1–3
- Career titles: 5 Challengers
- Highest ranking: No. 115 (19 May 2025)
- Current ranking: No. 351 (9 November 2026)

Grand Slam doubles results
- French Open: 2R (2019)

Grand Slam mixed doubles results
- French Open: 2R (2025, 2026)
- Last updated on: 9 November 2026.

Geoffrey Blancaneaux (born 8 August 1998) is a French professional tennis player who competes on the ATP Challenger Tour. He has a career-high ATP singles ranking of World No. 134 achieved on 14 November 2022 and a doubles ranking of No. 115 achieved on 19 May 2025.

== Junior career ==
Blancaneaux won the 2016 French Open boys' singles title, defeating Félix Auger-Aliassime in the final after saving three championship points.

== Professional career ==
=== 2017: Grand Slam debut ===
In September 2017, Blancaneaux made his Grand Slam debut, after receiving a wildcard to enter the main draw at the US Open.

=== 2021: First Challenger title ===
In December 2021, Blancaneaux won his first Challenger singles tournament at the Maia Challenger, defeating Tseng Chun-hsin in the finals.

=== 2022-2024: French Open, Masters and top 150 debuts ===
Seeded No. 190 at the 2022 French Open he qualified to make his Grand Slam debut at this Major on his sixth attempt. He reached the top 150 on 8 August 2022.

In October, Blancaneaux made his Masters debut, after receiving a wildcard to enter the qualifying draw at the 2022 Rolex Paris Masters. As a result, he reached a new career high ranking of No. 134 on 14 November 2022.

In May 2023, Blancaneaux reached his second final on the ATP Challenger Tour at the Tunis Open, losing to Sho Shimabukuro in the final.

In February 2024, Blancaneaux won his second Challenger title at the Delhi Open, defeating Coleman Wong in the final.

=== 2025: Top 125 debut in doubles ===
In February, Blancaneaux won his third Challenger title at the Brazzaville Challenger, defeating fellow countryman Calvin Hemery in the final. He also reached the final in the doubles tournament, partnering with Maxime Chazal, but lost in the final to top seeds Mateo Barreiros Reyes and Paulo Andre Saraiva Dos Santos. Blancaneaux reached three consecutive Challenger doubles finals by also reaching the final at the Rwanda Challenger and Rwanda Challenger II, both times partnering with Zdeněk Kolář.

== Junior Grand Slam finals ==
=== Singles: 1 (1 title) ===
Result	Year	Tournament	Surface	Opponent	Score
Win	2016	French Open	Clay	(Canada) Félix Auger-Aliassime	1–6, 6–3, 8–6

== Performance timeline ==
Key
W	F	SF	QF	#R	RR	Q#	DNQ	A	NH

(W) winner; (F) finalist; (SF) semifinalist; (QF) quarterfinalist; (#R) rounds 4, 3, 2, 1; (RR) round-robin stage; (Q#) qualification round; (DNQ) did not qualify; (A) absent; (NH) not held; (SR) strike rate (events won / competed); (W–L) win–loss record.

=== Singles ===
Tournament	2016	2017	2018	2019	2020	2021	2022	2023	2024	2025	SR	W–L	Win%
Grand Slam tournaments
Australian Open	A	A	A	A	A	A	Q1	Q1	Q1	A	0 / 0	0–0	–
French Open	Q2	Q1	Q2	Q3	Q1	A	1R	Q3	Q3	Q3	0 / 1	0–1	0%
Wimbledon	A	A	A	A	NH	A	Q1	Q1	A	A	0 / 0	0–0	–
US Open	A	1R	A	A	A	A	Q3	Q1	A		0 / 1	0–1	0%
Win–loss	0–0	0–1	0–0	0–0	0–0	0–0	0–1	0–0	0–0	0–0	0 / 2	0–2	0%

== ATP Challenger and ITF Tour finals ==
=== Singles: 20 (16–4) ===
Legend ATP Challenger (3–1) ITF Futures (13–3)	Finals by surface Hard (7–2) Clay (9–2) Grass (0–0) Carpet (0–0)

Result	W–L	Date	Tournament	Tier	Surface	Opponent	Score
Win	1–0	Apr 2017	Tunisia F13, Hammamet	Futures	Clay	(Italy) Cristian Carli	4-6, 6–3, 6-0
Loss	1–1	Apr 2017	France F9, Angers	Futures	Clay	(France) Gleb Sakharov	4-6, 4-6
Win	2–1	Jul 2017	France F14, Bourg-en-Bresse	Futures	Clay	(France) Constant Lestienne	3-6, 6–2, 7-5
Win	3–1	Jul 2017	Turkey F25, Istanbul	Futures	Clay	(Uruguay) Martin Cuevas	7-5, 6-1
Win	4–1	Jul 2017	Turkey F26, Istanbul	Futures	Clay	(Brazil) Bruno Sant'Anna	6-7^{(8-10)}, 6–4, 6-2
Loss	4–2	Feb 2018	Tunisia F4, Djerba	Futures	Hard	(France) Laurent Lokoli	2–6, 1-6
Win	5–2	Mar 2018	Croatia F3, Opatija	Futures	Clay	(Croatia) Nino Serdarusic	6-2, 3–6, 6-2
Win	6–2	Nov 2018	Tunisia F38, Monastir	Futures	Hard	(France) Ronan Joncour	6-0, 6-1
Win	7–2	Nov 2018	South Africa F1, Stellenbosch	Futures	Hard	(Germany) Sebastian Prechtel	6-4, 6-0
Win	8–2	Mar 2019	M15 Doha, Qatar	World Tennis Tour	Hard	(Australia) Jacob Grills	6-4, 6-1
Win	9–2	Mar 2019	M15 Tabarka, Tunisia	World Tennis Tour	Clay	(Spain) Nikolas Sanchez Izquierdo	6-2, 7-5
Win	10–2	Apr 2019	M15 Tabarka, Tunisia	World Tennis Tour	Clay	(Brazil) Orlando Luz	7-6^{(7-3)}, 6-4
Win	11–2	Nov 2019	M15 Heraklion, Greece	World Tennis Tour	Hard	(Israel) Yshai Oliel	6-1, 6-2
Loss	11–3	Jan 2020	M25 Rancho Santa Fe, USA	World Tennis Tour	Hard	(United States) Brandon Nakashima	3–6, 3–6
Win	12–3	Feb 2020	M15 Cancun, Mexico	World Tennis Tour	Hard	(Argentina) Maximiliano Estevez	6-7^{(5-7)}, 6–3, 6-1
Win	13–3	Dec 2021	Maia, Portugal	Challenger	Clay	(Chinese Taipei) Tseng Chun-hsin	3-6, 6–3, 6-2
Win	14–3	Mar 2022	M25 Santo Domingo, Dominican Republic	World Tennis Tour	Hard	(Australia) Rinky Hijikata	3-6, 6–2, 6-2
Loss	14–4	May 2023	Tunis, Tunisia	Challenger	Clay	(Japan) Sho Shimabukuro	4–6, 4–6
Win	15–4	Feb 2024	New Delhi, India	Challenger	Hard	(Hong Kong) Coleman Wong	6–4, 6–2
Win	16–4	Feb 2025	Brazzaville, Republic of Congo	Challenger	Clay	(France) Calvin Hemery	6–3, 6–4

=== Doubles: 21 (10 titles, 10 runner-ups, 1 non-complete) ===
Legend ATP Challenger (5–5) ITF Futures (5–5)	Finals by surface Hard (6–3) Clay (4–7)

Result	W–L	Date	Tournament	Tier	Surface	Partner	Opponents	Score
Loss	0-1	Oct 2016	France F22, Saint-Dizier	Futures	Hard	(France) Evan Furness	(France) Mick Lescure (France) Hugo Nys	2-6, 3-6
Win	1-1	Jan 2017	Hong Kong F6, Hong Kong	Futures	Hard	(Japan) Takuto Niki	(Hong Kong) Karan Rastogi (Hong Kong) Chun Hun Wong	7-6^{(8-6)}, 6-0
Loss	1-2	Apr 2017	Tunisia F15, Hammamet	Futures	Clay	(France) Antoine Hoang	(Argentina) Franco Agamenone (Argentina) Hernán Casanova	5-7, 6–1, [5-10]
Loss	1-3	Jul 2017	Belgium F2, Arlon	Futures	Clay	(France) C De la Bassetiere	(France) Florian Lakat (France) Arthur Rinderknech	1-6, 6–4, [4-10]
Win	2-3	Jun 2018	Lyon, France	Challenger	Clay	(France) Elliot Benchetrit	(Chinese Taipei) Hsieh Cheng-peng (Switzerland) Luca Margaroli	6-3, 4–6, [10-7]
Win	3-3	Feb 2019	M15 Monastir, Tunisia	World Tennis Tour	Hard	(France) Arthur Rinderknech	(Czech Republic) Marek Gengel (Czech Republic) Petr Nouza	6-1, 6-4
Win	4-3	Mar 2019	M15 Doha, Qatar	World Tennis Tour	Hard	(Belgium) Zizou Bergs	(Belgium) Arnaud Bovy (Netherlands) Jesper De Jong	6-2, 6-4
Loss	4-4	Mar 2019	M15 Tabarka, Tunisia	World Tennis Tour	Clay	(France) Clement Tabur	(Peru) Alexander Merino (Germany) Christoph Negritu	2-6, 2-6
Win	5-4	Dec 2019	M15 Monastir, Tunisia	World Tennis Tour	Hard	(Tunisia) Skander Mansouri	(France) Baptiste Crepatte (France) Gabriel Petit	6-0, 7-6^{(7-1)}
Loss	5-5	Feb 2020	M15 Cancun, Mexico	World Tennis Tour	Hard	(France) Gabriel Petit	(Brazil) Mateus Alves (Brazil) Igor Marcondes	6-7^{(5-7)}, 5-7
Loss	5-6	Aug 2021	Liberec, Czech Republic	Challenger	Clay	(France) Maxime Janvier	(Czech Republic) Roman Jebavy (Slovakia) Igor Zelenay	2-6, 7-6^{(8-6)}, [5-10]
Win	6-6	Feb 2022	M25 Cancun, Mexico	World Tennis Tour	Hard	(Greece) Michail Pervolarakis	(Bolivia) Boris Arias (Bolivia) Federico Zeballos	6-2, 4-6, [11-9]
Win	7-6	Apr 2022	Sanremo, Italy	Challenger	Clay	(France) Alexandre Müller	(Italy) Flavio Cobolli (Italy) Matteo Gigante	4–6, 6–3, [11–9]
Win	8-6	Jul 2022	Iasi, Romania	Challenger	Clay	(Argentina) Renzo Olivo	(Ecuador) Diego Hidalgo (Colombia) Cristian Rodriguez	6-4, 2–6, [10–6]
Win	9–6	Jun 2024	Heilbronn, Germany	Challenger	Clay	(Monaco) Romain Arneodo	(Germany) Jakob Schnaitter (Germany) Mark Wallner	7–6^{(7–5)}, 7–5, [10–3]
Win	10–6	Oct 2024	Saint-Brieuc, France	Challenger	Hard (i)	(France) Gabriel Debru	(Switzerland) Jakub Paul (Czech Republic) Matěj Vocel	3–3 [Def.]
Loss	10-7	Jan 2025	Koblenz, Germany	Challenger	Hard	(United Kingdom) Joshua Paris	(Switzerland) Jakub Paul (Netherlands) David Pel	[Walkover]
Loss	10-8	Feb 2025	Brazzaville, Republic of Congo	Challenger	Clay	(France) Maxime Chazal	(Brazil) Mateo Barreiros Reyes (Brazil) Paulo Andre Saraiva Dos Santos	4–6, 6–1, [6–10]
Loss	10-9	Feb 2025	Kigali, Rwanda	Challenger	Clay	(Czech Republic) Zdeněk Kolář	(Netherlands) Jesper de Jong (Netherlands) Max Houkes	3–6, 5–7
Loss	10–10	Mar 2025	Kigali II, Rwanda	Challenger	Clay	(Czech Republic) Zdeněk Kolář	(Bulgaria) Alexander Donski (India) Siddhant Banthia	4–6, 7–5, [8–10]
Not completed	10–10	Jul 2025	Zug, Switzerland	Challenger	Clay	(France) Harold Mayot	(South Korea) Nam Ji-sung (Japan) Takeru Yuzuki	x–x, x–x
