= Calvin Hemery =

French tennis player (born 1995)

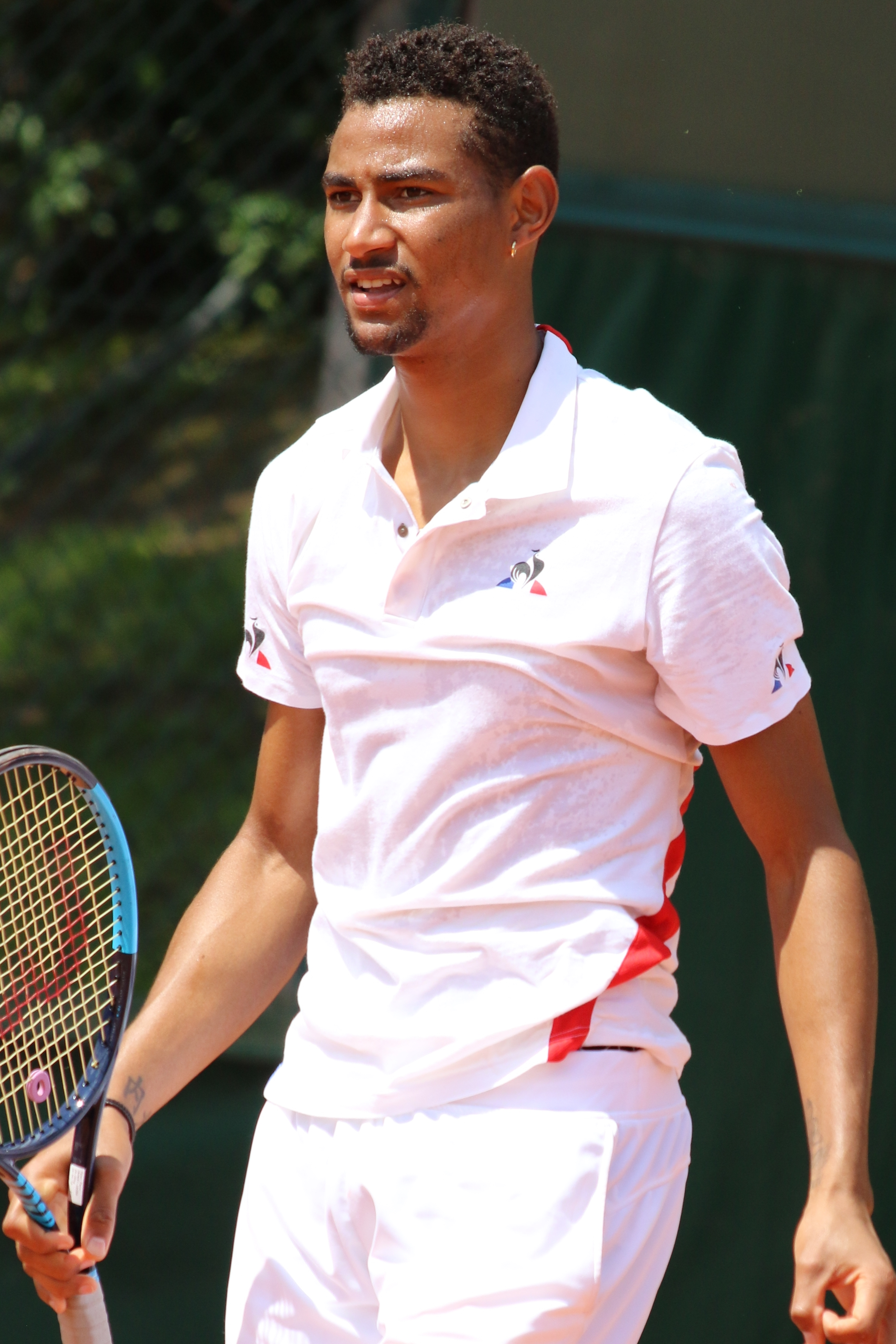
- Hemery at the 2018 French Open
- Country (sports): France
- Residence: Paris, France
- Born: 28 January 1995 (age 31) Les Lilas, France
- Height: 1.91 m (6 ft 3 in)
- Turned pro: 2013
- Plays: Right-handed (two-handed backhand)
- Coach: Christophe Couprie, Vilmaure Gauderic
- Prize money: US $960,059

Singles
- Career record: 2–10 (at ATP Tour level, Grand Slam level, and in Davis Cup)
- Career titles: 0
- Highest ranking: No. 116 (30 April 2018)
- Current ranking: No. 276 (19 October 2026)

Grand Slam singles results
- Australian Open: Q2 (2018, 2019)
- French Open: 1R (2018)
- Wimbledon: Q2 (2016, 2017)
- US Open: Q3 (2018)

Doubles
- Career record: 2–3 (at ATP Tour level, Grand Slam level, and in Davis Cup)
- Career titles: 0
- Highest ranking: No. 252 (24 December 2018)
- Current ranking: No. 970 (19 October 2026)

Grand Slam doubles results
- French Open: 3R (2018)
- Last updated on: 19 October 2026.

Calvin Hemery (born 28 January 1995) is a French tennis player of Nigerian descent. Hemery competes on the ATP Challenger Tour. He has a career-high ATP singles ranking of world No. 116 achieved on 30 April 2018 and a doubles ranking of No. 252 achieved on 24 December 2018.

== Professional career ==
=== 2015: ATP debut ===
Hemery made his ATP main draw debut at the 2015 Swiss Open Gstaad where he qualified for the main draw, then lost in the first round to Dušan Lajović.

In May, Hemery won his first singles Futures title in Santa Margherita di Pula, Italy, having lost his previous four Futures finals.

=== 2016: First ATP win ===
Hemery reached the main draw in Båstad as a qualifier where he recorded his first ATP Tour win, beating fellow countryman Tristan Lamasine in the first round, before losing to top seed David Ferrer in the second round.

=== 2017: First Challenger title ===
In June, Hemery reached his first Challenger final in Blois, France, losing to Damir Džumhur in the final. In July, he won his first Challenger title in Tampere, Finland, beating Pedro Sousa in the final.

=== 2018: Grand Slam and Masters debut ===
In March, Hemery made his debut on the ATP Tour Masters 1000 circuit at the Miami Open as a qualifier, losing to Thanasi Kokkinakis in the first round.

In May, Hemery was awarded a wildcard to the 2018 French Open, losing to Diego Schwartzman in the first round.

=== 2023: First Challenger final in five years, back in Top 200 ===
In July, Hemery reached the final at the 2023 Internationaux de Tennis de Troyes as a qualifier, his first final on the ATP Challenger Tour in more than five years, losing to fellow countryman Manuel Guinard, also a qualifier, in the final. In September, Hemery reached his second Challenger final of the year in Seville, losing to top seed and defending champion Roberto Carballés Baena in the final.

Ranked No. 203, he received a wildcard for the qualifying competition at the 2023 Moselle Open in Metz, France and qualified for the main draw.

He finished the season inside the top 200 at No. 191 on 13 November 2023.

=== 2025 ===
In July, Hemery reached the main draw of the Gstaad Open as a qualifier, his first ATP Tour main draw since 2023. He lost in the first round to Jérôme Kym.

=== 2026: Second Challenger title ===
In May, Hemery won his second Challenger title in Brazzaville, defeating top seed Florent Bax in the final.

== Personal life ==
Calvin Hemery was born in Les Lilas. He is one of few tennis players who are on a vegan diet. He is a vegan and animal defender according to his Instagram profile.

== Grand Slam performance timeline ==
Key
W	F	SF	QF	#R	RR	Q#	DNQ	A	NH

(W) winner; (F) finalist; (SF) semifinalist; (QF) quarterfinalist; (#R) rounds 4, 3, 2, 1; (RR) round-robin stage; (Q#) qualification round; (DNQ) did not qualify; (A) absent; (NH) not held; (SR) strike rate (events won / competed); (W–L) win–loss record.

=== Singles ===
Tournament	2016	2017	2018	2019	2020	2021	2022	2023	2024	2025	2026	SR	W–L	Win%
Australian Open	Q1	A	Q2	Q2	A	A	A	A	Q1	Q1	A	0 / 0	0–0	–
French Open	A	Q1	1R	Q3	Q1	A	A	A	Q1	Q1		0 / 1	0–1	0%
Wimbledon	Q2	Q2	Q1	A	NH	A	A	A	A	Q1		0 / 0	0–0	–
US Open	A	Q1	Q3	A	A	A	A	A	Q2	Q1		0 / 0	0–0	–
Win–loss	0–0	0–0	0–1	0–0	0–0	0–0	0–0	0–0	0–0	0–0	0–0	0 / 1	0–1	0%

== ATP Challenger and ITF Tour finals ==
=== Singles: 31 (11 titles, 20 runner-ups) ===
Legend (singles) ATP Challenger Tour (2–11) ITF Futures Tour (9–9)	Titles by surface Hard (1–9) Clay (10–10) Grass (0–0) Carpet (0–1)

Result	W–L	Date	Tournament	Tier	Surface	Opponent	Score
Loss	0–1	Apr 2013	France F7, France	Futures	Clay	(Belgium) Niels Desein	3–6, 2–6
Loss	0–2	Oct 2013	France F20, France	Futures	Hard	(Latvia) Andis Juška	6–7^{(5–7)}, 6–7^{(4–7)}
Loss	0–3	Sep 2014	Portugal F7, Portugal	Futures	Hard	(United Kingdom) Alexander Ward	3–6, 6–3, 3–6
Loss	0–4	Nov 2014	Kuwait F1, Kuwait	Futures	Hard	(Austria) Christian Trubrig	6–7^{(2–7)}, 3–6
Win	1–4	May 2015	Italy F9, Santa Margherita di Pula	Futures	Clay	(France) Johan Tatlot	7–6^{(7–5)}, 6–0
Loss	1–5	Oct 2016	Nigeria F6, Lagos	Futures	Hard	(Spain) Enrique Lopez Perez	5–7, 5–7
Loss	1–6	Dec 2016	Dominican Republic F3, Santo Domingo Este	Futures	Hard	(United States) Evan King	4–6, 6–7^{(11–9)}
Loss	1–7	Apr 2017	USA F14, Orange Park	Futures	Clay	(Colombia) Felipe Mantilla	2–6, 4–6
Win	2–7	Apr 2017	USA F15, Vero Beach	Futures	Clay	(United States) Sam Riffice	6–3, 6–1
Loss	2–8	May 2017	Nigeria F2, Abuja	Futures	Hard	(Serbia) Pedja Krstin	2–6, 4–6
Win	3–8	May 2017	Nigeria F3, Lagos	Futures	Hard	(Guatemala) Christopher Díaz Figueroa	6–7^{(2–7)}, 6–3, 6–1
Loss	3–9	Jun 2017	Blois, France	Challenger	Clay	(Bosnia and Herzegovina) Damir Džumhur	1–6, 3–6
Win	4–9	Jul 2017	Tampere, Finland	Challenger	Clay	(Portugal) Pedro Sousa	6–3, 6–4
Loss	4–10	Nov 2017	Kobe, Japan	Challenger	Hard (i)	(France) Stéphane Robert	6–7^{(1–7)}, 7–6^{(7–5)}, 1–6
Loss	4–11	Nov 2017	Toyota, Japan	Challenger	Carpet (i)	(Australia) Matthew Ebden	6–7^{(3–7)}, 3–6
Loss	4–12	Apr 2018	Nanchang, China	Challenger	Clay (i)	(France) Quentin Halys	3–6, 2–6
Win	5–12	Oct 2019	M25 Lagos, Nigeria	World Tennis Tour	Clay	(Bosnia and Herzegovina) Aldin Šetkić	6-1, 6-2
Win	6–12	Oct 2019	M25 Lagos, Nigeria	World Tennis Tour	Clay	(Bosnia and Herzegovina) Aldin Šetkić	4-2 (RET)
Win	7–12	Dec 2019	M15 Monastir, Tunisia	World Tennis Tour	Clay	(France) Arthur Rinderknech	7-6^{(7–4)}, 6-4
Loss	7–13	Jul 2021	M25 Denia, Spain	World Tennis Tour	Clay	(Dominican Republic) Nick Hardt	6-7^{(3–7)}, 6-7^{(5–7)}
Win	8–13	Aug 2021	M25 Caslano, Switzerland	World Tennis Tour	Clay	(Switzerland) Rémy Bertola	6–4, 4–6, 6–4
Loss	8–14	Jul 2023	Troyes, France	Challenger	Clay	(France) Manuel Guinard	3–6, 3–6
Win	9–14	Jul 2023	M25 Brazzaville, Congo	World Tennis Tour	Clay	(France) Thomas Setodji	4–6, 6–2, 6–3
Loss	9–15	Sep 2023	Seville, Spain	Challenger	Clay	(Spain) Roberto Carballés Baena	3–6, 1–6
Loss	9–16	Jun 2024	Blois, France	Challenger	Hard (i)	(Lithuania) Ričardas Berankis	6–7^{(4–7)}, 5–7
Loss	9–17	Jul 2024	Tampere, Finland	Challenger	Clay	(Spain) Daniel Rincón	1–6, 6–7^{(4–7)}
Loss	9–18	Nov 2024	Lyon, France	Challenger	Hard (i)	(Belgium) Raphaël Collignon	4–6, 2–6
Loss	9–19	Feb 2025	Brazzaville, Republic of Congo	Challenger	Clay	(France) Geoffrey Blancaneaux	3–6, 4–6
Loss	9–20	Jun 2025	Troyes, France	Challenger	Clay	(United Kingdom) Jan Choinski	4–6, 7–6^{(7–4)}, 2–6
Win	10–20	May 2026	Brazzaville, Republic of Congo	Challenger	Clay	(France) Florent Bax	7–5, 3–6, 7–6^{(7–2)}
Win	11–20	Oct 2026	M25 Kigali, Ruanda	World Tennis Tour	Clay	(Zimbabwe) Benjamin Lock	6–3, 6–3
