= Mateo Barreiros Reyes =

Brazilian tennis player (born 2000)

- Country (sports): Brazil
- Born: 14 December 2000 (age 24) Quito, Ecuador
- Height: 1.78 m (5 ft 10 in)
- Plays: Left-handed (two-handed backhand)
- Prize money: US$ 41,684

Singles
- Career record: 0–0 (at ATP Tour level, Grand Slam level, and in Davis Cup)
- Career titles: 0
- Highest ranking: No. 595 (29 July 2024)
- Current ranking: No. 948 (17 November 2025)

Doubles
- Career record: 0–0 (at ATP Tour level, Grand Slam level, and in Davis Cup)
- Career titles: 0; 1 Challenger
- Highest ranking: No. 310 (16 June 2025)
- Current ranking: No. 393 (17 November 2025)
- Last updated on: 17 November 2025.

Mateo Barreiros Reyes (born 14 December 2000) is a Brazilian professional tennis player who was born in Ecuador. He has a career-high ATP singles ranking of No. 595, achieved on 29 July 2024 and a best doubles ranking of No. 310, achieved on 16 June 2025.

Barreiros Reyes has won one ATP Challenger doubles title at the 2025 Brazzaville Challenger, with countryman Paulo Saraiva dos Santos.

In July 2025, he was given a provisional suspension after failing an anti-doping test at an ATP Challenger event in Colombia in May that year.

== ATP Challenger Tour finals ==
=== Doubles: 1 (title) ===
Legend ATP Challenger Tour (1–0)

Result	W–L	Date	Tournament	Tier	Surface	Partner	Opponents	Score
Win	1–0	Feb 2025	Brazzaville Challenger, Republic of the Congo	Challenger	Clay	(Brazil) Paulo Saraiva dos Santos	(France) Geoffrey Blancaneaux (France) Maxime Chazal	6–4, 1–6, [10–6]
