= Brandon Pérez =

Venezuelan tennis player

- Country (sports): Venezuela
- Residence: Caracas, Venezuela
- Born: 14 January 2000 (age 26) Durham, North Carolina, U.S.
- Height: 1.91 m (6 ft 3 in)
- Plays: Left-handed (two-handed backhand)
- College: Virginia Tech (2019–2020); University of Nebraska–Lincoln (2020–2022)
- Prize money: US $50,522

Singles
- Career record: 0–3 (at ATP Tour level, Grand Slam level, and in Davis Cup)
- Career titles: 0
- Highest ranking: No. 970 (8 August 2025)
- Current ranking: No. 1,811 (5 October 2026)

Doubles
- Career record: 0–2 (at ATP Tour level, Grand Slam level, and in Davis Cup)
- Career titles: 0
- Highest ranking: No. 263 (5 October 2026)
- Current ranking: No. 263 (5 October 2026)

Team competitions
- Davis Cup: 0–3
- Last updated on: 29 September 2026.

Brandon Pérez (born 14 January 2000) is a Venezuelan tennis player. He has a career high ATP singles ranking of world No. 970 achieved on 8 August 2025 and a career high ATP doubles ranking of No. 263 achieved on 5 October 2026. He is currently the No. 3 Venezuelan player.

Pérez played at Virginia Tech and Nebraska.

Pérez represents Venezuela at the Davis Cup, where he has a W/L record of 0–3.
