= Karan Singh (tennis) =

Indian tennis player (born 2003)

- Country (sports): India
- Born: 30 June 2003 (age 23) Karnal, India
- Height: 1.85 m (6 ft 1 in)
- Plays: Right-handed (two-handed backhand)
- Coach: Aditya Sachdeva
- Prize money: US $116,042

Singles
- Career record: 1–0
- Career titles: 0
- Highest ranking: No. 354 (2 November 2026)
- Current ranking: No. 354 (2 November 2026)

Doubles
- Career record: 0–0
- Career titles: 1 Challenger
- Highest ranking: No. 319 (27 October 2025)
- Current ranking: No. 677 (2 November 2026)
- Last updated on: 2 November 2026.

Karan Singh (born 30 June 2003) is an Indian tennis player. He has a career high ATP singles ranking of world No. 354 achieved on 2 November 2026 and a career high doubles ranking of No. 319 achieved on 27 October 2025.

== Career ==
Singh has won one ATP Challenger doubles title at the 2024 Brazzaville Challenger with Florent Bax.
