= 2026 Ankara Challenger – Doubles =

Doubles
- 2026 Ankara Challenger

Events
Singles	Doubles
- Ankara Challenger

This is the first edition of the tournament.

== Seeds ==
1. (Spain) David Vega Hernández / (Germany) Kai Wehnelt
2. (Venezuela) Juan José Bianchi / (United States) Joshua Sheehy
3. (Turkey) S Mert Özdemir / (Turkey) Mert Naci Türker
4. Egor Agafonov / (Italy) Alexander Binda

== Draw ==
Key

- Q = Qualifier
- WC = Wild card
- LL = Lucky loser
- Alt = Alternate
- ITF = ITF entry
- PR = Protected ranking
- SR = Special ranking
- SE = Special exempt
- JE = Junior exempt
- JR = Junior Accelerator Programme entrant
- CO = College Accelerator Programme entrant
- NG = Next Gen Accelerator Program entrant
- w/o = Walkover
- r = Retired
- d = Defaulted

First round
1	(Spain) D Vega Hernández (Germany) K Wehnelt
(Germany) Adrian Oetzbach (Germany) M Wiskandt
(Turkey) Melih Anavatan (Turkey) Kerem Yılmaz
(Germany) Aaron Funk (Germany) Jannik Maute
3	(Turkey) S Mert Özdemir (Turkey) MN Türker
(Japan) Kenta Miyoshi (United Kingdom) Oliver Okonkwo
Vardan Manukyan (Serbia) Tadija Radovanović
Svyatoslav Gulin (Serbia) Dušan Obradović
(Ukraine) Andriy Poritskyi (Ukraine) Vadym Ursu
(France) M Bobichon (France) Robin Catry
WC	(Turkey) Kuzey Çetinkaya (Turkey) Pamir Derin Diker
4	E Agafonov (Italy) A Binda
(Poland) P Matuszewski (Poland) Jan Werbliński
WC	(Turkey) K Kırcı (Turkey) Gökberk Sarıtaş
(Turkey) T Duran (Bulgaria) Y Milev
2	(Venezuela) Juan José Bianchi (United States) J Sheehy

Quarterfinals
(Germany)
(Serbia)

Semifinals

Final
