= 2026 Levante Open =

- Date: 28 September – 4 October
- Edition: 1st
- Surface: Clay
- Location: Bari, Italy

Champions

Singles
- (Italy) Samuele Pieri

Doubles
- (Ukraine) Oleksandr Ovcharenko / (Germany) Kai Wehnelt
- Levante Open

The 2026 Levante Open was a professional tennis tournament played on clay courts. It was the first edition of the tournament which was part of the 2026 ATP Challenger Tour. It took place in Bari, Italy between 28 September and 4 October 2026.

== Singles main-draw entrants ==
=== Seeds ===
| Country | Player | Rank^{1} | Seed |
|---|---|---|---|
| HUN | Zsombor Piros | 114 | 1 |
| DEN | Elmer Møller | 176 | 2 |
| UKR | Vitaliy Sachko | 180 | 3 |
| ITA | Lorenzo Giustino | 207 | 4 |
| ESP | Pol Martín Tiffon | 215 | 5 |
| ITA | Gianluca Cadenasso | 219 | 6 |
| GBR | Jay Clarke | 247 | 7 |
| CZE | Martin Krumich | 257 | 8 |

- ^{1} Rankings are as of 21 September 2026.

=== Other entrants ===
The following players received wildcards into the singles main draw:

- (Italy) Lorenzo Angelini
- (Hungary) Zsombor Piros
- (Italy) Matteo Sciahbasi

The following player received entry into the singles main draw through the College Accelerator programme:

- (Germany) Benito Sanchez Martinez

The following player received entry into the singles main draw through the Next Gen Accelerator programme:

- (Germany) Mika Petkovic

The following players received entry into the singles main draw as alternates:

- (Italy) Massimo Giunta
- (Italy) Juan Cruz Martin Manzano

The following players received entry from the qualifying draw:

- (Italy) Fabrizio Andaloro
- (Italy) Federico Arnaboldi
- (Italy) Pierluigi Basile
- (Czech Republic) Matthew William Donald
- (Spain) Imanol López Morillo
- (Germany) John Sperle

== Champions ==
=== Singles ===
- (Italy) Samuele Pieri def. (Italy) Juan Cruz Martin Manzano 6–4, 6–1.

=== Doubles ===
- (Ukraine) Oleksandr Ovcharenko / (Germany) Kai Wehnelt def. (Mexico) Luis Carlos Álvarez / (Germany) Adrian Oetzbach 6–1, 6–3.
