= 2021 ITF Men's World Tennis Tour (July–September) =

The 2021 ITF Men's World Tennis Tour is the 2021 edition of the second-tier tour for men's professional tennis. It is organised by the International Tennis Federation and is a tier below the ATP Challenger Tour. The ITF Men's World Tennis Tour includes tournaments with prize money ranging from $15,000 to $25,000.

== Key ==
M25 tournaments
M15 tournaments

== Month ==
=== July ===
Week of	Tournament	Winner	Runners-up	Semifinalists	Quarterfinalists
July 5	Ajaccio, France; Hard; M25+H; Singles and Doubles Draws	(France) Clément Chidekh; 6–3, 6–0	(Greece) Petros Tsitsipas	(France) Loris Pourroy (France) Calvin Hemery	(France) Lisandru Rodriguez (France) Giovanni Mpetshi Perricard (France) Maxime Hamou (France) Jurgen Briand
July 5	Ajaccio, France; Hard; M25+H; Singles and Doubles Draws	(Brazil) Mateus Alves (France) Arthur Bouquier; 6–4, 7–6^{(9–7)}	(France) Lisandru Rodriguez (Italy) Alessio Tramontin	(France) Loris Pourroy (France) Calvin Hemery	(France) Lisandru Rodriguez (France) Giovanni Mpetshi Perricard (France) Maxime Hamou (France) Jurgen Briand
July 5	Marburg, Germany; Clay; M25; Singles and Doubles Draws	(Germany) Louis Wessels; 4–6, 7–5, 7–6^{(7–5)},	(Dominican Republic) Nick Hardt	(Netherlands) Ryan Nijboer (Serbia) Marko Tepavac	(Germany) Milan Welte (Sweden) Jonathan Mridha (Germany) Henri Squire (Spain) Álvaro López San Martín
July 5	Marburg, Germany; Clay; M25; Singles and Doubles Draws	(Netherlands) Daniel de Jonge (Netherlands) Guy den Ouden; 2–6, 6–4, [11–9]	(Germany) Tim Handel (Switzerland) Yannik Steinegger	(Netherlands) Ryan Nijboer (Serbia) Marko Tepavac	(Germany) Milan Welte (Sweden) Jonathan Mridha (Germany) Henri Squire (Spain) Álvaro López San Martín
July 5	Casinalbo, Italy; Clay; M25; Singles and Doubles Draws	(Italy) Franco Agamenone; 6–4, 7–5	(Italy) Matteo Arnaldi	(Netherlands) Gijs Brouwer (Brazil) Matheus Pucinelli de Almeida	(Italy) Gianmarco Ferrari (Spain) Nikolás Sánchez Izquierdo (Italy) Riccardo Balzerani (Italy) Francesco Maestrelli
July 5	Casinalbo, Italy; Clay; M25; Singles and Doubles Draws	(Italy) Alessandro Motti (Italy) Julian Ocleppo; 6–3, 6–2	(Brazil) Matheus Pucinelli de Almeida (Brazil) Pedro Sakamoto	(Netherlands) Gijs Brouwer (Brazil) Matheus Pucinelli de Almeida	(Italy) Gianmarco Ferrari (Spain) Nikolás Sánchez Izquierdo (Italy) Riccardo Balzerani (Italy) Francesco Maestrelli
July 5	Nur-Sultan, Kazakhstan; Hard; M25; Singles and Doubles Draws	(Russia) Evgeny Karlovskiy; 7–6^{(7–4)}, 2–6, 6–3	(Chinese Taipei) Hsu Yu-hsiou	(Russia) Andrey Kuznetsov (Kazakhstan) Beibit Zhukayev	(Uzbekistan) Sanjar Fayziev (Monaco) Lucas Catarina (Russia) Petr Bar Biryukov (Israel) Yshai Oliel
July 5	Nur-Sultan, Kazakhstan; Hard; M25; Singles and Doubles Draws	(Uzbekistan) Sanjar Fayziev (Greece) Markos Kalovelonis; 7–6^{(7–1)}, 6–3	(Ukraine) Oleksii Krutykh (Ukraine) Vladyslav Manafov	(Russia) Andrey Kuznetsov (Kazakhstan) Beibit Zhukayev	(Uzbekistan) Sanjar Fayziev (Monaco) Lucas Catarina (Russia) Petr Bar Biryukov (Israel) Yshai Oliel
July 5	Velenje, Slovenia; Clay; M25; Singles and Doubles Draws	(Russia) Alexander Shevchenko; 6–1, 6–2	(Czech Republic) Patrik Rikl	(Chile) Gonzalo Lama (Colombia) Cristian Rodríguez	(Argentina) Hernán Casanova (Austria) Peter Goldsteiner (Austria) Lenny Hampel (France) Ronan Joncour
July 5	Velenje, Slovenia; Clay; M25; Singles and Doubles Draws	(Austria) Neil Oberleitner (Austria) David Pichler; 6–4, 7–6^{(7–1)}	(Croatia) Duje Kekez (Croatia) Frane Ninčević	(Chile) Gonzalo Lama (Colombia) Cristian Rodríguez	(Argentina) Hernán Casanova (Austria) Peter Goldsteiner (Austria) Lenny Hampel (France) Ronan Joncour
July 5	Sofia, Bulgaria; Clay; M15; Singles and Doubles Draws	(Sweden) Dragoș Nicolae Mădăraș; 2–6, 6–4, 7–6^{(8–6)}	(Argentina) Francisco Comesaña	(Italy) Alexander Weis (China) Li Hanwen	(Bulgaria) Gabriel Donev (United States) Andrew Fenty (Ukraine) Nikita Mashtakov (Romania) Nicolae Frunză
July 5	Sofia, Bulgaria; Clay; M15; Singles and Doubles Draws	(Russia) Denis Klok (Ukraine) Oleg Prihodko; 7–5, 6–4	(Chinese Taipei) Ray Ho (Romania) Bogdan Pavel	(Italy) Alexander Weis (China) Li Hanwen	(Bulgaria) Gabriel Donev (United States) Andrew Fenty (Ukraine) Nikita Mashtakov (Romania) Nicolae Frunză
July 5	Almada, Portugal; Hard; M15; Singles and Doubles Draws	(United Kingdom) Daniel Cox; 6–2, 5–7, 6–2	(Portugal) Fábio Coelho	(Brazil) João Lucas Reis da Silva (Portugal) Duarte Vale	(Russia) Andrey Chepelev (Chile) Diego Fernández Flores (United Kingdom) Harry Wendelken (France) Ugo Blanchet
July 5	Almada, Portugal; Hard; M15; Singles and Doubles Draws	(Australia) Thomas Fancutt (United Kingdom) Evan Hoyt; 6–4, 6–2	(Portugal) Fábio Coelho (Brazil) Natan Rodrigues	(Brazil) João Lucas Reis da Silva (Portugal) Duarte Vale	(Russia) Andrey Chepelev (Chile) Diego Fernández Flores (United Kingdom) Harry Wendelken (France) Ugo Blanchet
July 5	Poprad, Slovakia; Clay; M15; Singles and Doubles Draws	(Switzerland) Damien Wenger; 6–2, 7–5	(Czech Republic) Tomáš Jiroušek	(Slovakia) Miloš Karol (Argentina) Román Andrés Burruchaga	(Canada) Filip Peliwo (Romania) Cezar Crețu (Argentina) Ignacio Monzón (United Kingdom) George Loffhagen
July 5	Poprad, Slovakia; Clay; M15; Singles and Doubles Draws	(Argentina) Román Andrés Burruchaga (Argentina) Fermín Tenti; 6–3, 6–3	(Switzerland) Luca Castelnuovo (Czech Republic) Dominik Palán	(Slovakia) Miloš Karol (Argentina) Román Andrés Burruchaga	(Canada) Filip Peliwo (Romania) Cezar Crețu (Argentina) Ignacio Monzón (United Kingdom) George Loffhagen
July 5	Monastir, Tunisia; Hard; M15; Singles and Doubles Draws	(France) Valentin Vacherot; 6–4, 6–4	(United States) Omni Kumar	(Australia) Rinky Hijikata (Argentina) Matías Franco Descotte	(Denmark) August Holmgren (Ecuador) Antonio Cayetano March (Lebanon) Hady Habib (France) Térence Atmane
July 5	Monastir, Tunisia; Hard; M15; Singles and Doubles Draws	(United States) Jacob Brumm (Denmark) August Holmgren; 7–5, 7–6^{(7–5)}	(Australia) Rinky Hijikata (Australia) Kody Pearson	(Australia) Rinky Hijikata (Argentina) Matías Franco Descotte	(Denmark) August Holmgren (Ecuador) Antonio Cayetano March (Lebanon) Hady Habib (France) Térence Atmane
July 12	Telfs, Austria; Clay; M25; Singles and Doubles Draws	(Austria) Filip Misolic; 7–6^{(9–7)}, 6–1	(Romania) Bogdan Ionuț Apostol	(Austria) Lukas Neumayer (Russia) Kirill Kivattsev	(Russia) Alexander Shevchenko (Chile) Gonzalo Lama (Austria) Gerald Melzer (Spain) Àlex Martí Pujolràs
July 12	Telfs, Austria; Clay; M25; Singles and Doubles Draws	(Austria) Neil Oberleitner (Latvia) Mārtiņš Podžus; 7–6^{(7–5)}, 2–6, [10–5]	(Austria) Filip Misolic (Austria) Lukas Neumayer	(Austria) Lukas Neumayer (Russia) Kirill Kivattsev	(Russia) Alexander Shevchenko (Chile) Gonzalo Lama (Austria) Gerald Melzer (Spain) Àlex Martí Pujolràs
July 12	Uriage, France; Clay; M25; Singles and Doubles Draws	(France) Giovanni Mpetshi Perricard; 6–3, 4–6, 7–6^{(7–4)}	(France) Arthur Fils	(Argentina) Facundo Juárez (France) Calvin Hemery	(Spain) Oriol Roca Batalla (Spain) Pol Martín Tiffon (France) Clément Tabur (France) Maxime Mora
July 12	Uriage, France; Clay; M25; Singles and Doubles Draws	(France) Arthur Fils (France) Giovanni Mpetshi Perricard; 7–6^{(7–5)}, 6–2	(France) Allan Deschamps (France) Maxime Mora	(Argentina) Facundo Juárez (France) Calvin Hemery	(Spain) Oriol Roca Batalla (Spain) Pol Martín Tiffon (France) Clément Tabur (France) Maxime Mora
July 12	Idanha-a-Nova, Portugal; Hard; M25; Singles and Doubles Draws	(United States) Nicolas Moreno de Alboran; 1–0, ret.	(United States) Zane Khan	(Portugal) Daniel Rodrigues (United Kingdom) Anton Matusevich	(Portugal) Tiago Cação (Moldova) Alexander Cozbinov (Brazil) João Lucas Reis da Silva (Republic of Ireland) Simon Carr
July 12	Idanha-a-Nova, Portugal; Hard; M25; Singles and Doubles Draws	(Australia) Thomas Fancutt (United Kingdom) Evan Hoyt; 6–3, 6–2	(Japan) Takuto Niki (Japan) Kaito Uesugi	(Portugal) Daniel Rodrigues (United Kingdom) Anton Matusevich	(Portugal) Tiago Cação (Moldova) Alexander Cozbinov (Brazil) João Lucas Reis da Silva (Republic of Ireland) Simon Carr
July 12	Doboj, Bosnia and Herzegovina; Clay; M15; Singles and Doubles Draws	(Hungary) Zsombor Piros; 6–3, 6–2	(Hungary) Péter Fajta	(Serbia) Dušan Obradović (Czech Republic) Martin Krumich	(United States) Andrew Fenty (France) Jean Thirouin (Hungary) Gergely Madarász (Croatia) Duje Kekez
July 12	Doboj, Bosnia and Herzegovina; Clay; M15; Singles and Doubles Draws	(Slovakia) Krištof Minárik (Slovakia) Lukáš Pokorný; 7–6^{(7–5)}, 6–4	(United Kingdom) Felix Gill (Ukraine) Oleksandr Ovcharenko	(Serbia) Dušan Obradović (Czech Republic) Martin Krumich	(United States) Andrew Fenty (France) Jean Thirouin (Hungary) Gergely Madarász (Croatia) Duje Kekez
July 12	L'Aquila, Italy; Clay; M15; Singles and Doubles Draws	(Italy) Federico Arnaboldi; 4–6, 7–5, 6–1	(Italy) Alexander Weis	(Italy) Luciano Darderi (Italy) Marcello Serafini	(Italy) Gianmarco Ferrari (Italy) Marco Miceli (Italy) Andrea Basso (Spain) Pablo Llamas Ruiz
July 12	L'Aquila, Italy; Clay; M15; Singles and Doubles Draws	(Argentina) Juan Ignacio Galarza (Slovenia) Tomás Lipovšek Puches; 6–3, 6–1	(Italy) Luciano Darderi (United Kingdom) Billy Harris	(Italy) Luciano Darderi (Italy) Marcello Serafini	(Italy) Gianmarco Ferrari (Italy) Marco Miceli (Italy) Andrea Basso (Spain) Pablo Llamas Ruiz
July 12	Monastir, Tunisia; Hard; M15; Singles and Doubles Draws	(Australia) Rinky Hijikata; 6–3, 6–1	(France) Valentin Vacherot	(Australia) Jeremy Beale (Ivory Coast) Eliakim Coulibaly	(Japan) Kazuma Kawachi (France) Arthur Bouquier (Tunisia) Moez Echargui (Italy) Samuel Vincent Ruggeri
July 12	Monastir, Tunisia; Hard; M15; Singles and Doubles Draws	(France) Arthur Bouquier (Argentina) Santiago Rodríguez Taverna; 5–7, 6–4, [10–7]	(Australia) Jeremy Beale (New Zealand) Ajeet Rai	(Australia) Jeremy Beale (Ivory Coast) Eliakim Coulibaly	(Japan) Kazuma Kawachi (France) Arthur Bouquier (Tunisia) Moez Echargui (Italy) Samuel Vincent Ruggeri
July 19	Kottingbrunn, Austria; Clay; M25; Singles and Doubles Draws	(Hungary) Máté Valkusz; 6–1, 6–2	(Argentina) Francisco Comesaña	(Austria) Lenny Hampel (Hungary) Zsombor Piros	(Belarus) Uladzimir Ignatik (Romania) Bogdan Ionuț Apostol (Italy) Giovanni Fonio (Czech Republic) Pavel Nejedlý
July 19	Kottingbrunn, Austria; Clay; M25; Singles and Doubles Draws	(Latvia) Mārtiņš Podžus (Greece) Petros Tsitsipas; 6–3, 6–3	(Czech Republic) David Poljak (Russia) Alexander Shevchenko	(Austria) Lenny Hampel (Hungary) Zsombor Piros	(Belarus) Uladzimir Ignatik (Romania) Bogdan Ionuț Apostol (Italy) Giovanni Fonio (Czech Republic) Pavel Nejedlý
July 19	Idanha-a-Nova, Portugal; Hard; M25; Singles and Doubles Draws	(Spain) Alejandro Moro Cañas; 7–6^{(7–5)}, 6–4	(Republic of Ireland) Simon Carr	(Brazil) Gilbert Klier Júnior (France) Clément Chidekh	(United Kingdom) Anton Matusevich (United States) Alafia Ayeni (United States) Nicolas Moreno de Alboran (France) Robin Bertrand
July 19	Idanha-a-Nova, Portugal; Hard; M25; Singles and Doubles Draws	(Republic of Ireland) Simon Carr (Moldova) Alexander Cozbinov; 6–3, 2–6, [10–5]	(Brazil) João Lucas Reis da Silva (Brazil) Gilbert Klier Júnior	(Brazil) Gilbert Klier Júnior (France) Clément Chidekh	(United Kingdom) Anton Matusevich (United States) Alafia Ayeni (United States) Nicolas Moreno de Alboran (France) Robin Bertrand
July 19	Gandia, Spain; Clay; M25; Singles and Doubles Draws	(Spain) Javier Barranco Cosano; 6–4, 6–2	(France) Antoine Escoffier	(Spain) Álvaro López San Martín (Argentina) Mariano Kestelboim	(Spain) Daniel Mérida (Spain) Francisco Andreu García (Spain) Carlos Sánchez Jover (Argentina) Facundo Juárez
July 19	Gandia, Spain; Clay; M25; Singles and Doubles Draws	(Russia) Yan Bondarevskiy (Ukraine) Eric Vanshelboim; 6–3, 3–6, [10–4]	(Spain) Javier Barranco Cosano (Colombia) Alejandro Gómez	(Spain) Álvaro López San Martín (Argentina) Mariano Kestelboim	(Spain) Daniel Mérida (Spain) Francisco Andreu García (Spain) Carlos Sánchez Jover (Argentina) Facundo Juárez
July 19	Cairo, Egypt; Clay; M15; Singles and Doubles Draws	(Spain) José Francisco Vidal Azorín; 7–5, 7–5	(France) Matthieu Perchicot	(Germany) Kai Wehnelt (Ukraine) Oleksandr Ovcharenko	(Romania) Cezar Crețu (Italy) Lorenzo Bocchi (France) Quentin Folliot (France) Nathan Seateun
July 19	Cairo, Egypt; Clay; M15; Singles and Doubles Draws	(Argentina) Alejo Lorenzo Lingua Lavallén (Spain) José Francisco Vidal Azorín; 6–0, 6–2	(Egypt) Amr Asrawy (Egypt) Sherif Makhlouf	(Germany) Kai Wehnelt (Ukraine) Oleksandr Ovcharenko	(Romania) Cezar Crețu (Italy) Lorenzo Bocchi (France) Quentin Folliot (France) Nathan Seateun
July 19	Perugia, Italy; Clay; M15; Singles and Doubles Draws	(Italy) Andrea Basso; 6–3, 4–6, 7–6^{(7–3)}	(Italy) Luca Nardi	(Italy) Gabriele Piraino (Italy) Marcello Serafini	(Sweden) Dragoș Nicolae Mădăraș (Italy) Alessandro Pecci (Italy) Federico Arnaboldi (Slovenia) Tomás Lipovšek Puches
July 19	Perugia, Italy; Clay; M15; Singles and Doubles Draws	(Italy) Luciano Darderi (United Kingdom) Billy Harris; Walkover	(Argentina) Juan Ignacio Galarza (Slovenia) Tomás Lipovšek Puches	(Italy) Gabriele Piraino (Italy) Marcello Serafini	(Sweden) Dragoș Nicolae Mădăraș (Italy) Alessandro Pecci (Italy) Federico Arnaboldi (Slovenia) Tomás Lipovšek Puches
July 19	Esch-sur-Alzette, Luxembourg; Clay; M15; Singles and Doubles Draws	(United States) Patrick Kypson; 4–6, 6–3, 7–5	(Romania) David Ionel	(Argentina) Gabriel Alejandro Hidalgo (Italy) Tommaso Compagnucci	(Italy) Alexander Weis (Netherlands) Mick Veldheer (United States) Alexander Kotzen (Netherlands) Deney Wassermann
July 19	Esch-sur-Alzette, Luxembourg; Clay; M15; Singles and Doubles Draws	(Italy) Davide Pozzi (Italy) Alexander Weis; 6–1, 4–6, [10–8]	(Australia) Matthew Romios (Netherlands) Mick Veldheer	(Argentina) Gabriel Alejandro Hidalgo (Italy) Tommaso Compagnucci	(Italy) Alexander Weis (Netherlands) Mick Veldheer (United States) Alexander Kotzen (Netherlands) Deney Wassermann
July 19	Monastir, Tunisia; Hard; M15; Singles and Doubles Draws	(Argentina) Santiago Rodríguez Taverna; 6–4, 3–6, 7–5	(Argentina) Matías Franco Descotte	(Italy) Erik Crepaldi (Italy) Mattia Bellucci	(France) Maxence Beaugé (Italy) Gabriele Bosio (New Zealand) Ajeet Rai (Jordan) Abedallah Shelbayh
July 19	Monastir, Tunisia; Hard; M15; Singles and Doubles Draws	(France) Arthur Bouquier (Argentina) Santiago Rodríguez Taverna; 6–7^{(2–7)}, 6–3, [10–6]	(Jordan) Abedallah Shelbayh (Spain) Pedro Vives Marcos	(Italy) Erik Crepaldi (Italy) Mattia Bellucci	(France) Maxence Beaugé (Italy) Gabriele Bosio (New Zealand) Ajeet Rai (Jordan) Abedallah Shelbayh
July 19	Edwardsville, United States; Hard; M15; Singles and Doubles Draws	(Australia) Rinky Hijikata; 6–3, 6–1	(United States) Strong Kirchheimer	(United States) Christian Langmo (United States) Cannon Kingsley	(United Kingdom) Paul Jubb (United States) Eliot Spizzirri (Jamaica) Blaise Bicknell (United States) William Griffith
July 19	Edwardsville, United States; Hard; M15; Singles and Doubles Draws	(United States) Nathan Ponwith (United States) Reese Stalder; 6–4, 6–4	(United States) Bruno Kuzuhara (United States) Christian Langmo	(United States) Christian Langmo (United States) Cannon Kingsley	(United Kingdom) Paul Jubb (United States) Eliot Spizzirri (Jamaica) Blaise Bicknell (United States) William Griffith
July 26	Portoviejo, Ecuador; Clay; M25; Singles and Doubles Draws	(Peru) Arklon Huertas del Pino; 6–1, 6–7^{(0–7)}, 7–6^{(7–4)}	(Peru) Conner Huertas del Pino	(Peru) Nicolás Álvarez (Spain) Pol Martín Tiffon	(Brazil) José Pereira (Ecuador) Antonio Cayetano March (United States) Tristan McCormick (Chile) Gonzalo Lama
July 26	Portoviejo, Ecuador; Clay; M25; Singles and Doubles Draws	(Mexico) Luis Patiño (Colombia) Cristian Rodríguez; 6–3, 6–2	(Peru) Arklon Huertas del Pino (Venezuela) Ricardo Rodríguez	(Peru) Nicolás Álvarez (Spain) Pol Martín Tiffon	(Brazil) José Pereira (Ecuador) Antonio Cayetano March (United States) Tristan McCormick (Chile) Gonzalo Lama
July 26	Telavi, Georgia; Clay; M25; Singles and Doubles Draws	(Bulgaria) Alexandar Lazarov; 6–1, 1–0, ret.	(Georgia (country)) Aleksandre Metreveli	(Ukraine) Vladyslav Orlov (Italy) Alessandro Ingarao	(Russia) Yan Bondarevskiy (Serbia) Boris Butulija (Turkey) Yankı Erel (Georgia (country)) Zura Tkemaladze
July 26	Telavi, Georgia; Clay; M25; Singles and Doubles Draws	(Belarus) Martin Borisiouk (Belarus) Aliaksandr Liaonenka; 6–7^{(4–7)}, 6–2, [10–5]	(Georgia (country)) Aleksandre Bakshi (Georgia (country)) Aleksandre Metreveli	(Ukraine) Vladyslav Orlov (Italy) Alessandro Ingarao	(Russia) Yan Bondarevskiy (Serbia) Boris Butulija (Turkey) Yankı Erel (Georgia (country)) Zura Tkemaladze
July 26	Dénia, Spain; Clay; M25; Singles and Doubles Draws	(Dominican Republic) Nick Hardt; 7–6^{(7–3)}, 7–6^{(7–4)}	(France) Calvin Hemery	(Spain) Eduard Esteve Lobato (Spain) Carlos López Montagud	(Spain) Javier Barranco Cosano (Spain) Álvaro López San Martín (Spain) Imanol López Morillo (Brazil) Daniel Dutra da Silva
July 26	Dénia, Spain; Clay; M25; Singles and Doubles Draws	(Argentina) Facundo Díaz Acosta (Japan) Shintaro Mochizuki; 7–5, 6–3	(Russia) Andrey Chepelev (Poland) Paweł Ciaś	(Spain) Eduard Esteve Lobato (Spain) Carlos López Montagud	(Spain) Javier Barranco Cosano (Spain) Álvaro López San Martín (Spain) Imanol López Morillo (Brazil) Daniel Dutra da Silva
July 26	Champaign, United States; Hard; M25; Singles and Doubles Draws	(United States) Ben Shelton; 7–6^{(7–4)}, 6–3	(Netherlands) Gijs Brouwer	(Chinese Taipei) Hsu Yu-hsiou (Japan) Naoki Nakagawa	(United States) Alfredo Perez (United Kingdom) Paul Jubb (Australia) Dane Sweeny (Canada) Joshua Peck
July 26	Champaign, United States; Hard; M25; Singles and Doubles Draws	(United States) Ben Shelton (United States) Eliot Spizzirri; 6–4, 6–0	(South Korea) Chung Yun-seong (Japan) Rio Noguchi	(Chinese Taipei) Hsu Yu-hsiou (Japan) Naoki Nakagawa	(United States) Alfredo Perez (United Kingdom) Paul Jubb (Australia) Dane Sweeny (Canada) Joshua Peck
July 26	Vejle, Denmark; Clay; M15; Singles and Doubles Draws	(Turkey) Ergi Kırkın; 7–6^{(7–4)}, 6–4	(Denmark) August Holmgren	(Argentina) Matías Zukas (Sweden) Jonathan Mridha	(Sweden) Karl Friberg (Denmark) Henrik Heise Korsgaard (Netherlands) Guy den Ouden (United States) Patrick Kypson
July 26	Vejle, Denmark; Clay; M15; Singles and Doubles Draws	(Denmark) Benjamin Hannestad (Denmark) Carl Emil Overbeck; 7–6^{(8–6)}, 4–6, [10–8]	(Denmark) Johannes Ingildsen (Denmark) Christian Sigsgaard	(Argentina) Matías Zukas (Sweden) Jonathan Mridha	(Sweden) Karl Friberg (Denmark) Henrik Heise Korsgaard (Netherlands) Guy den Ouden (United States) Patrick Kypson
July 26	Cairo, Egypt; Clay; M15; Singles and Doubles Draws	(Argentina) Juan Bautista Torres; 1–6, 6–1, 7–5	(Argentina) Alejo Lorenzo Lingua Lavallén	(France) Matthieu Perchicot (France) Quentin Folliot	(Argentina) Ignacio Monzón (Italy) Lorenzo Bocchi (Brazil) Gustavo Heide (Italy) Luca Tomasetto
July 26	Cairo, Egypt; Clay; M15; Singles and Doubles Draws	(Japan) Keisuke Saitoh (Japan) Daisuke Sumizawa; 7–6^{(8–6)}, 4–6, [10–6]	(France) Jaimee Floyd Angele (France) Quentin Folliot	(France) Matthieu Perchicot (France) Quentin Folliot	(Argentina) Ignacio Monzón (Italy) Lorenzo Bocchi (Brazil) Gustavo Heide (Italy) Luca Tomasetto
July 26	Castelo Branco, Portugal; Hard; M15; Singles and Doubles Draws	(Brazil) Gilbert Klier Júnior; 6–2, 6–1	(France) Clément Chidekh	(Italy) Luca Giacomini (Brazil) João Lucas Reis da Silva	(Portugal) Daniel Batista (Portugal) Francisco Cabral (Portugal) Duarte Vale (Japan) Sho Shimabukuro
July 26	Castelo Branco, Portugal; Hard; M15; Singles and Doubles Draws	(Portugal) Francisco Cabral (Portugal) Gonçalo Falcão; 7–6^{(7–5)}, 6–4	(Portugal) Fábio Coelho (Brazil) Natan Rodrigues	(Italy) Luca Giacomini (Brazil) João Lucas Reis da Silva	(Portugal) Daniel Batista (Portugal) Francisco Cabral (Portugal) Duarte Vale (Japan) Sho Shimabukuro
July 26	Novi Sad, Serbia; Clay; M15; Singles and Doubles Draws	(Austria) Filip Misolic; 6–4, 6–4	(Italy) Luciano Darderi	(Argentina) Juan Pablo Paz (Romania) Nicolae Frunză	(Bulgaria) Gabriel Donev (Sweden) Dragoș Nicolae Mădăraș (Argentina) Mariano Navone (Hungary) Péter Nagy
July 26	Novi Sad, Serbia; Clay; M15; Singles and Doubles Draws	(United Kingdom) Charles Broom (Czech Republic) Tadeáš Paroulek; 2–6, 6–3, [10–6]	(Romania) Nicolae Frunză (Romania) Alexandru Jecan	(Argentina) Juan Pablo Paz (Romania) Nicolae Frunză	(Bulgaria) Gabriel Donev (Sweden) Dragoș Nicolae Mădăraș (Argentina) Mariano Navone (Hungary) Péter Nagy
July 26	Monastir, Tunisia; Hard; M15; Singles and Doubles Draws	(Ivory Coast) Eliakim Coulibaly; 5–7, 6–2, 6–4	(Italy) Luca Potenza	(Australia) Jeremy Beale (South Africa) Khololwam Montsi	(India) Rishab Agarwal (Italy) Gabriele Bosio (France) Sascha Gueymard Wayenburg (Argentina) Matías Franco Descotte
July 26	Monastir, Tunisia; Hard; M15; Singles and Doubles Draws	(France) Arthur Bouquier (Argentina) Santiago Rodríguez Taverna; 6–3, 6–2	(Italy) Antonio Massara (Italy) Luca Potenza	(Australia) Jeremy Beale (South Africa) Khololwam Montsi	(India) Rishab Agarwal (Italy) Gabriele Bosio (France) Sascha Gueymard Wayenburg (Argentina) Matías Franco Descotte

=== August ===
Week of	Tournament	Winner	Runners-up	Semifinalists	Quarterfinalists
August 2	Guayaquil, Ecuador; Clay; M25; Singles and Doubles Draws	(Colombia) Cristian Rodríguez; 6–3, 7–6^{(7–3)}	(Brazil) José Pereira	(Chile) Gonzalo Lama (Venezuela) Ricardo Rodríguez	(Mexico) Luis Patiño (Spain) Pol Martín Tiffon (Brazil) Igor Marcondes (Colombia) Juan Sebastián Gómez
August 2	Guayaquil, Ecuador; Clay; M25; Singles and Doubles Draws	(Ecuador) Diego Hidalgo (Colombia) Cristian Rodríguez; 6–3, 6–7^{(7–9)}, [10–6]	(Peru) Conner Huertas del Pino (Peru) Jorge Panta	(Chile) Gonzalo Lama (Venezuela) Ricardo Rodríguez	(Mexico) Luis Patiño (Spain) Pol Martín Tiffon (Brazil) Igor Marcondes (Colombia) Juan Sebastián Gómez
August 2	Wetzlar, Germany; Clay; M25; Singles and Doubles Draws	(Germany) Peter Heller; 6–4, 6–7^{(5–7)}, 6–4	(Belgium) Christopher Heyman	(Austria) David Pichler (France) Harold Mayot	(Germany) Henri Squire (Germany) Constantin Schmitz (Germany) Louis Wessels (Russia) Alexey Vatutin
August 2	Wetzlar, Germany; Clay; M25; Singles and Doubles Draws	(Germany) Fabian Fallert (Germany) Peter Heller; 6–4, 7–6^{(7–4)}	(Colombia) Alejandro Gómez (Germany) Kai Wehnelt	(Austria) David Pichler (France) Harold Mayot	(Germany) Henri Squire (Germany) Constantin Schmitz (Germany) Louis Wessels (Russia) Alexey Vatutin
August 2	Bolzano, Italy; Clay; M25; Singles and Doubles Draws	(Italy) Matteo Arnaldi; 6–0, 6–1	(Italy) Alexander Weis	(Italy) Raúl Brancaccio (Italy) Federico Arnaboldi	(Italy) Andrea Picchione (Italy) Luca Vanni (Italy) Marco Bortolotti (Italy) Andrea Gola
August 2	Bolzano, Italy; Clay; M25; Singles and Doubles Draws	(Romania) Victor Vlad Cornea (Greece) Petros Tsitsipas; 6–3, 6–4	(Italy) Marco Bortolotti (Brazil) Daniel Dutra da Silva	(Italy) Raúl Brancaccio (Italy) Federico Arnaboldi	(Italy) Andrea Picchione (Italy) Luca Vanni (Italy) Marco Bortolotti (Italy) Andrea Gola
August 2	Grodzisk Mazowiecki, Poland; Clay; M25; Singles and Doubles Draws	(Hungary) Zsombor Piros; 6–3, 7–6^{(7–3)}	(Japan) Shintaro Mochizuki	(Poland) Paweł Ciaś (Czech Republic) David Poljak	(Ukraine) Illya Beloborodko (Poland) Maciej Rajski (Czech Republic) Adam Pavlásek (United States) Toby Kodat
August 2	Grodzisk Mazowiecki, Poland; Clay; M25; Singles and Doubles Draws	(Netherlands) Mats Hermans (Poland) Piotr Matuszewski; 6–4, 7–5	(Brazil) Pedro Sakamoto (Brazil) Gilbert Klier Júnior	(Poland) Paweł Ciaś (Czech Republic) David Poljak	(Ukraine) Illya Beloborodko (Poland) Maciej Rajski (Czech Republic) Adam Pavlásek (United States) Toby Kodat
August 2	Pitești, Romania; Clay; M25; Singles and Doubles Draws	(Chinese Taipei) Tseng Chun-hsin; 6–3, 3–6, 6–0	(Argentina) Hernán Casanova	(Romania) Gabi Adrian Boitan (Romania) David Ionel	(Sweden) Dragoș Nicolae Mădăraș (France) Corentin Denolly (Romania) Sebastian Gima (Serbia) Marko Tepavac
August 2	Pitești, Romania; Clay; M25; Singles and Doubles Draws	(France) Valentin Royer (Chinese Taipei) Tseng Chun-hsin; 4–6, 6–2, [10–8]	(France) Corentin Denolly (France) Clement Tabur	(Romania) Gabi Adrian Boitan (Romania) David Ionel	(Sweden) Dragoș Nicolae Mădăraș (France) Corentin Denolly (Romania) Sebastian Gima (Serbia) Marko Tepavac
August 2	Decatur, United States; Hard; M25; Singles and Doubles Draws	(United States) Eliot Spizzirri; 6–2, 7–5	(United Kingdom) Aidan McHugh	(United Kingdom) Paul Jubb (United States) Alex Rybakov	(United States) Cannon Kingsley (Latvia) Kārlis Ozoliņš (South Korea) Chung Yun-seong (Netherlands) Gijs Brouwer
August 2	Decatur, United States; Hard; M25; Singles and Doubles Draws	(Netherlands) Gijs Brouwer (United States) Reese Stalder; 6–3, 7–5	(Chinese Taipei) Hsu Yu-hsiou (Japan) Shintaro Imai	(United Kingdom) Paul Jubb (United States) Alex Rybakov	(United States) Cannon Kingsley (Latvia) Kārlis Ozoliņš (South Korea) Chung Yun-seong (Netherlands) Gijs Brouwer
August 2	Frederiksberg, Denmark; Clay; M15; Singles and Doubles Draws	(Sweden) Jonathan Mridha; 6–3, 7–6^{(7–5)}	(Sweden) Markus Eriksson	(Denmark) August Holmgren (Denmark) Benjamin Hannestad	(United States) Vasil Kirkov (Netherlands) Mick Veldheer (Denmark) Christian Sigsgaard (Denmark) Johannes Ingildsen
August 2	Frederiksberg, Denmark; Clay; M15; Singles and Doubles Draws	(Denmark) Johannes Ingildsen (Denmark) Christian Sigsgaard; 7–5, 6–3	(Denmark) Benjamin Hannestad (Denmark) Simon Friis Søndergaard	(Denmark) August Holmgren (Denmark) Benjamin Hannestad	(United States) Vasil Kirkov (Netherlands) Mick Veldheer (Denmark) Christian Sigsgaard (Denmark) Johannes Ingildsen
August 2	Cairo, Egypt; Clay; M15; Singles and Doubles Draws	(Spain) José Francisco Vidal Azorín; 6–1, 5–7, 6–3	(France) Quentin Folliot	(Italy) Stefano Battaglino (Argentina) Juan Bautista Torres	(Austria) Lukas Krainer (Argentina) Alejo Lorenzo Lingua Lavallén (Italy) Lorenzo Bocchi (Ukraine) Oleksandr Ovcharenko
August 2	Cairo, Egypt; Clay; M15; Singles and Doubles Draws	(Uruguay) Ignacio Carou (Argentina) Ignacio Monzón; 6–1, 6–3	(Cyprus) Menelaos Efstathiou (Cyprus) Sergis Kyratzis	(Italy) Stefano Battaglino (Argentina) Juan Bautista Torres	(Austria) Lukas Krainer (Argentina) Alejo Lorenzo Lingua Lavallén (Italy) Lorenzo Bocchi (Ukraine) Oleksandr Ovcharenko
August 2	Pärnu, Estonia; Clay; M15; Singles and Doubles Draws	(Turkey) Ergi Kırkın; 5–7, 6–3, 6–3	(Estonia) Mattias Siimar	(Italy) Simone Roncalli (Estonia) Vladimir Ivanov	(United Kingdom) Luke Johnson (Russia) Yan Sabanin (Estonia) Kenneth Raisma (Finland) Otto Virtanen
August 2	Pärnu, Estonia; Clay; M15; Singles and Doubles Draws	(Finland) Eero Vasa (Finland) Iiro Vasa; 6–7^{(1–7)}, 7–6^{(7–5)}, [10–7]	(Lithuania) Tadas Babelis (Lithuania) Ainius Sabaliauskas	(Italy) Simone Roncalli (Estonia) Vladimir Ivanov	(United Kingdom) Luke Johnson (Russia) Yan Sabanin (Estonia) Kenneth Raisma (Finland) Otto Virtanen
August 2	Telavi, Georgia; Clay; M15; Singles and Doubles Draws	(Ukraine) Oleg Prihodko; 7–6^{(7–4)}, 6–3	(Russia) Yan Bondarevskiy	(Turkey) Yankı Erel (Kazakhstan) Dostanbek Tashbulatov	(Kazakhstan) Grigoriy Lomakin (United Kingdom) Julian Cash (Bulgaria) Simon Anthony Ivanov (Bulgaria) Gabriel Donev
August 2	Telavi, Georgia; Clay; M15; Singles and Doubles Draws	(Russia) Yan Bondarevskiy (Kazakhstan) Grigoriy Lomakin; 6–4, 3–6, [10–6]	(Russia) Denis Klok (Ukraine) Oleg Prihodko	(Turkey) Yankı Erel (Kazakhstan) Dostanbek Tashbulatov	(Kazakhstan) Grigoriy Lomakin (United Kingdom) Julian Cash (Bulgaria) Simon Anthony Ivanov (Bulgaria) Gabriel Donev
August 2	Novi Sad, Serbia; Clay; M15; Singles and Doubles Draws	(Austria) Filip Misolic; 6–4, 6–3	(Argentina) Francisco Comesaña	(Argentina) Mariano Navone (Hungary) Máté Valkusz	(Czech Republic) Tadeáš Paroulek (Croatia) Domagoj Bilješko (North Macedonia) Gorazd Srbljak (Brazil) Pedro Boscardin Dias
August 2	Novi Sad, Serbia; Clay; M15; Singles and Doubles Draws	(Tunisia) Anis Ghorbel (Tunisia) Aziz Ouakaa; 6–4, 7–5	(United Kingdom) Charles Broom (Croatia) Alen Rogić Hadžalić	(Argentina) Mariano Navone (Hungary) Máté Valkusz	(Czech Republic) Tadeáš Paroulek (Croatia) Domagoj Bilješko (North Macedonia) Gorazd Srbljak (Brazil) Pedro Boscardin Dias
August 2	Xàtiva, Spain; Clay; M15; Singles and Doubles Draws	(Italy) Francesco Passaro; 2–6, 6–1, 6–4	(Spain) Iñaki Montes de la Torre	(France) Alexis Gautier (Spain) Carlos López Montagud	(Spain) Benjamín Winter López (Spain) Imanol López Morillo (Spain) Alejandro García (Spain) Carlos Sánchez Jover
August 2	Xàtiva, Spain; Clay; M15; Singles and Doubles Draws	(Spain) Imanol López Morillo (Italy) Francesco Passaro; 6–4, 6–4	(Spain) Alberto Barroso Campos (Spain) Benjamín Winter López	(France) Alexis Gautier (Spain) Carlos López Montagud	(Spain) Benjamín Winter López (Spain) Imanol López Morillo (Spain) Alejandro García (Spain) Carlos Sánchez Jover
August 2	Monastir, Tunisia; Hard; M15; Singles and Doubles Draws	(Italy) Mattia Bellucci; 6–3, 6–3	(Italy) Luca Potenza	(Lebanon) Hady Habib (Estonia) Daniil Glinka	(Tunisia) Aziz Dougaz (Italy) Erik Crepaldi (Hong Kong) Coleman Wong (Australia) Thomas Fancutt
August 2	Monastir, Tunisia; Hard; M15; Singles and Doubles Draws	(Australia) Blake Ellis (New Zealand) Ajeet Rai; 6–2, 6–3	(Japan) Taisei Ichikawa (Japan) Seita Watanabe	(Lebanon) Hady Habib (Estonia) Daniil Glinka	(Tunisia) Aziz Dougaz (Italy) Erik Crepaldi (Hong Kong) Coleman Wong (Australia) Thomas Fancutt
August 9	Frankfurt, Germany; Clay; M25; Singles and Doubles Draws	(Spain) Eduard Esteve Lobato; 7–6^{(7–1)}, 6–2	(Israel) Yshai Oliel	(Germany) Lucas Gerch (Spain) Oriol Roca Batalla	(Germany) Louis Wessels (Argentina) Mariano Kestelboim (Brazil) Daniel Dutra da Silva (Israel) Daniel Cukierman
August 9	Frankfurt, Germany; Clay; M25; Singles and Doubles Draws	(Colombia) Alejandro Gómez (Slovakia) Miloš Karol; 6–3, 6–3	(Argentina) Juan Ignacio Galarza (Argentina) Mariano Kestelboim	(Germany) Lucas Gerch (Spain) Oriol Roca Batalla	(Germany) Louis Wessels (Argentina) Mariano Kestelboim (Brazil) Daniel Dutra da Silva (Israel) Daniel Cukierman
August 9	Gdynia, Poland; Clay; M15; Singles and Doubles Draws	(Argentina) Román Andrés Burruchaga; 6–7^{(2–7)}, 7–6^{(7–3)}, 6–1	(Canada) Filip Peliwo	(Hungary) Fábián Marozsán (France) Alexis Musialek	(Poland) Daniel Michalski (Argentina) Alejo Lorenzo Lingua Lavallén (Poland) Paweł Ciaś (Netherlands) Daniel de Jonge
August 9	Gdynia, Poland; Clay; M15; Singles and Doubles Draws	(United Kingdom) Arthur Fery (United Kingdom) Luke Johnson; 6–3, 6–1	(Poland) Michał Mikuła (Poland) Yann Wójcik	(Hungary) Fábián Marozsán (France) Alexis Musialek	(Poland) Daniel Michalski (Argentina) Alejo Lorenzo Lingua Lavallén (Poland) Paweł Ciaś (Netherlands) Daniel de Jonge
August 9	Curtea de Argeș, Romania; Clay; M15; Singles and Doubles Draws	(Romania) Ștefan Paloși; 6–4, 6–4	(Argentina) Facundo Juárez	(Argentina) Matías Zukas (Portugal) Tiago Cação	(Romania) Călin Manda (Sweden) Dragoș Nicolae Mădăraș (Romania) David Ionel (Argentina) Francisco Comesaña
August 9	Curtea de Argeș, Romania; Clay; M15; Singles and Doubles Draws	(Chinese Taipei) Ray Ho (Romania) Bogdan Pavel; 6–4, 6–7^{(3–7)}, [10–3]	(Romania) Sebastian Gima (Romania) Ștefan Paloși	(Argentina) Matías Zukas (Portugal) Tiago Cação	(Romania) Călin Manda (Sweden) Dragoș Nicolae Mădăraș (Romania) David Ionel (Argentina) Francisco Comesaña
August 9	Monastir, Tunisia; Hard; M15; Singles and Doubles Draws	(France) Dan Added; 6–3, 6–4	(Argentina) Santiago Rodríguez Taverna	(Tunisia) Aziz Dougaz (Japan) Sho Shimabukuro	(Australia) Dane Sweeny (Japan) Takuya Kumasaka (Australia) Thomas Fancutt (Italy) Luciano Darderi
August 9	Monastir, Tunisia; Hard; M15; Singles and Doubles Draws	(Australia) Jeremy Beale (Australia) Thomas Fancutt; 3–6, 7–6^{(7–1)}, [13–11]	(Argentina) Mateo Nicolás Martínez (Argentina) Santiago Rodríguez Taverna	(Tunisia) Aziz Dougaz (Japan) Sho Shimabukuro	(Australia) Dane Sweeny (Japan) Takuya Kumasaka (Australia) Thomas Fancutt (Italy) Luciano Darderi
August 16	Koksijde, Belgium; Clay; M25; Singles and Doubles Draws	(France) Matthieu Perchicot; 6–3, 2–6, 7–5	(Belgium) Joris De Loore	(Belgium) Arnaud Bovy (France) Mathys Erhard	(Russia) Ivan Gakhov (Republic of Ireland) Simon Carr (France) Laurent Lokoli (Belgium) Christopher Heyman
August 16	Koksijde, Belgium; Clay; M25; Singles and Doubles Draws	(Belgium) Niels Desein (Belgium) Yannick Mertens; 6–2, 6–0	(Netherlands) Gijs Brouwer (Netherlands) Mats Hermans	(Belgium) Arnaud Bovy (France) Mathys Erhard	(Russia) Ivan Gakhov (Republic of Ireland) Simon Carr (France) Laurent Lokoli (Belgium) Christopher Heyman
August 16	Prostějov, Czech Republic; Clay; M25; Singles and Doubles Draws	(Spain) Nikolás Sánchez Izquierdo; 6–4, 1–6, 6–4	(Argentina) Facundo Díaz Acosta	(Czech Republic) Dalibor Svrčina (United States) Alex Rybakov	(Austria) Lucas Miedler (United States) Toby Kodat (Hungary) Zsombor Piros (United States) Nick Chappell
August 16	Prostějov, Czech Republic; Clay; M25; Singles and Doubles Draws	(United States) Nick Chappell (United States) Reese Stalder; 3–6, 7–6^{(7–3)}, [10–8]	(Czech Republic) Marek Gengel (Belarus) Uladzimir Ignatik	(Czech Republic) Dalibor Svrčina (United States) Alex Rybakov	(Austria) Lucas Miedler (United States) Toby Kodat (Hungary) Zsombor Piros (United States) Nick Chappell
August 16	Überlingen, Germany; Clay; M25; Singles and Doubles Draws	(Turkey) Ergi Kırkın; 6–3, 4–6, 6–4	(Germany) Henri Squire	(Germany) Tim Handel (Spain) Eduard Esteve Lobato	(United States) Oliver Crawford (Germany) Liam Gavrielides (United States) Ryan Harrison (Germany) Louis Wessels
August 16	Überlingen, Germany; Clay; M25; Singles and Doubles Draws	(Germany) Hendrik Jebens (Germany) Niklas Schell; 6–4, 7–5	(Germany) Fabian Fallert (Germany) Tim Handel	(Germany) Tim Handel (Spain) Eduard Esteve Lobato	(United States) Oliver Crawford (Germany) Liam Gavrielides (United States) Ryan Harrison (Germany) Louis Wessels
August 16	Bacău, Romania; Clay; M25+H; Singles and Doubles Draws	(Israel) Yshai Oliel; 6–4, 4–6, 6–4	(France) Arthur Cazaux	(Sweden) Dragoș Nicolae Mădăraș (Ukraine) Vladyslav Orlov	(Portugal) Tiago Cação (Ukraine) Oleksii Krutykh (Argentina) Matías Zukas (Bulgaria) Alexandar Lazarov
August 16	Bacău, Romania; Clay; M25+H; Singles and Doubles Draws	(Tunisia) Moez Echargui (Moldova) Ilya Snițari; 7–5, 6–3	(Romania) Vladimir Filip (Sweden) Dragoș Nicolae Mădăraș	(Sweden) Dragoș Nicolae Mădăraș (Ukraine) Vladyslav Orlov	(Portugal) Tiago Cação (Ukraine) Oleksii Krutykh (Argentina) Matías Zukas (Bulgaria) Alexandar Lazarov
August 16	Muttenz, Switzerland; Clay; M25; Singles and Doubles Draws	(Switzerland) Jakub Paul; 6–1, 7–5	(Finland) Otto Virtanen	(Switzerland) Rémy Bertola (Switzerland) Jérôme Kym	(Spain) Pol Martín Tiffon (Australia) Rinky Hijikata (Brazil) Oscar José Gutierrez (Colombia) Alejandro González
August 16	Muttenz, Switzerland; Clay; M25; Singles and Doubles Draws	(Brazil) Mateus Alves (Brazil) Oscar José Gutierrez; 6–3, 6–4	(Switzerland) Gabriele Moghini (Switzerland) Nicolás Parizzia	(Switzerland) Rémy Bertola (Switzerland) Jérôme Kym	(Spain) Pol Martín Tiffon (Australia) Rinky Hijikata (Brazil) Oscar José Gutierrez (Colombia) Alejandro González
August 16	Warmbad-Villach, Austria; Clay; M15; Singles and Doubles Draws	(Germany) Peter Heller; 6–3, 6–4	(Italy) Alexander Weis	(Brazil) Gabriel Décamps (Italy) Matteo Donati	(Austria) Lukas Neumayer (Austria) Lukas Krainer (Austria) Jakob Aichhorn (Germany) Sebastian Prechtel
August 16	Warmbad-Villach, Austria; Clay; M15; Singles and Doubles Draws	(Italy) Daniele Capecchi (Italy) Alexander Weis; 3–6, 6–3, [10–6]	(Austria) Lukas Krainer (Austria) Neil Oberleitner	(Brazil) Gabriel Décamps (Italy) Matteo Donati	(Austria) Lukas Neumayer (Austria) Lukas Krainer (Austria) Jakob Aichhorn (Germany) Sebastian Prechtel
August 16	Pescara, Italy; Clay; M15; Singles and Doubles Draws	(France) Alexis Gautier; 6–4, 6–4	(France) Arthur Reymond	(Italy) Emiliano Maggioli (Italy) Riccardo Balzerani	(Italy) Gian Marco Ortenzi (Italy) Giorgio Tabacco (France) Jean Thirouin (Slovenia) Tomás Lipovšek Puches
August 16	Pescara, Italy; Clay; M15; Singles and Doubles Draws	(Italy) Gabriele Piraino (Italy) Giorgio Tabacco; 5–7, 6–4, [10–7]	(Argentina) Alex Barrena (Slovenia) Tomás Lipovšek Puches	(Italy) Emiliano Maggioli (Italy) Riccardo Balzerani	(Italy) Gian Marco Ortenzi (Italy) Giorgio Tabacco (France) Jean Thirouin (Slovenia) Tomás Lipovšek Puches
August 16	Oldenzaal, Netherlands; Clay; M15; Singles and Doubles Draws	(Switzerland) Damien Wenger; 6–2, 6–3	(United Kingdom) Luke Johnson	(Italy) Lorenzo Bocchi (Netherlands) Guy den Heijer	(United Kingdom) Giles Hussey (Netherlands) Daniel de Jonge (Belgium) Alexander Hoogmartens (United Kingdom) Mark Whitehouse
August 16	Oldenzaal, Netherlands; Clay; M15; Singles and Doubles Draws	(Germany) Constantin Schmitz (Greece) Petros Tsitsipas; 7–6^{(7–4)}, 6–4	(United Kingdom) Jonathan Binding (United Kingdom) Mark Whitehouse	(Italy) Lorenzo Bocchi (Netherlands) Guy den Heijer	(United Kingdom) Giles Hussey (Netherlands) Daniel de Jonge (Belgium) Alexander Hoogmartens (United Kingdom) Mark Whitehouse
August 16	Łódź, Poland; Clay; M15; Singles and Doubles Draws	(Poland) Maciej Rajski; 6–3, 6–7^{(4–7)}, 6–1	(Poland) Yann Wójcik	(Brazil) Gilbert Klier Júnior (Brazil) Wilson Leite	(Poland) Daniel Michalski (Poland) Paweł Ciaś (Brazil) Igor Marcondes (Poland) Wojciech Marek
August 16	Łódź, Poland; Clay; M15; Singles and Doubles Draws	(Sweden) Filip Bergevi (Sweden) Markus Eriksson; 4–6, 6–2, [10–4]	(Latvia) Kārlis Ozoliņš (Greece) Aristotelis Thanos	(Brazil) Gilbert Klier Júnior (Brazil) Wilson Leite	(Poland) Daniel Michalski (Poland) Paweł Ciaś (Brazil) Igor Marcondes (Poland) Wojciech Marek
August 16	Bratislava, Slovakia; Clay; M15; Singles and Doubles Draws	(Hungary) Máté Valkusz; 3–6, 6–1, 5–4, ret.	(Hungary) Fábián Marozsán	(Hungary) Péter Fajta (Slovakia) Tomáš Líška	(Czech Republic) Jan Šátral (Austria) David Pichler (United States) Vasil Kirkov (Czech Republic) Robin Staněk
August 16	Bratislava, Slovakia; Clay; M15; Singles and Doubles Draws	(Hungary) Máté Valkusz (Hungary) Zsombor Velcz; 3–6, 7–6^{(8–6)}, [10–7]	(Czech Republic) Andrew Paulson (Czech Republic) Robin Staněk	(Hungary) Péter Fajta (Slovakia) Tomáš Líška	(Czech Republic) Jan Šátral (Austria) David Pichler (United States) Vasil Kirkov (Czech Republic) Robin Staněk
August 16	Monastir, Tunisia; Hard; M15; Singles and Doubles Draws	(Italy) Luciano Darderi; 6–2, 6–2	(Portugal) Duarte Vale	(United States) Kyle Seelig (United States) Gage Brymer	(Lebanon) Hady Habib (Italy) Gabriele Bosio (Australia) Jeremy Beale (Japan) Yuki Mochizuki
August 16	Monastir, Tunisia; Hard; M15; Singles and Doubles Draws	(Australia) Blake Ellis (Australia) Dane Sweeny; 7–6^{(7–3)}, 6–1	(Kazakhstan) Timur Khabibulin (Kazakhstan) Beibit Zhukayev	(United States) Kyle Seelig (United States) Gage Brymer	(Lebanon) Hady Habib (Italy) Gabriele Bosio (Australia) Jeremy Beale (Japan) Yuki Mochizuki
August 23	Trier, Germany; Clay; M25; Singles and Doubles Draws	(Germany) Tim Handel; 6–2, 6–4	(Germany) Louis Wessels	(Germany) Marvin Möller (Germany) Henri Squire	(Austria) Sandro Kopp (Netherlands) Mick Veldheer (France) Quentin Folliot (Netherlands) Ryan Nijboer
August 23	Trier, Germany; Clay; M25; Singles and Doubles Draws	(Tunisia) Moez Echargui (France) Quentin Folliot; 1–6, 6–2, [10–8]	(Germany) Kai Wehnelt (Germany) Patrick Zahraj	(Germany) Marvin Möller (Germany) Henri Squire	(Austria) Sandro Kopp (Netherlands) Mick Veldheer (France) Quentin Folliot (Netherlands) Ryan Nijboer
August 23	Lesa, Italy; Clay; M25+H; Singles and Doubles Draws	(France) Matteo Martineau; 7–5, 2–6, 6–2	(Italy) Alessandro Bega	(France) Harold Mayot (Argentina) Matías Franco Descotte	(Italy) Federico Arnaboldi (Italy) Andrea Picchione (United States) Christian Langmo (France) Jean Thirouin
August 23	Lesa, Italy; Clay; M25+H; Singles and Doubles Draws	(Italy) Alessandro Bega (France) Harold Mayot; 6–3, 6–1	(Italy) Andrea Basso (Italy) Pietro Rondoni	(France) Harold Mayot (Argentina) Matías Franco Descotte	(Italy) Federico Arnaboldi (Italy) Andrea Picchione (United States) Christian Langmo (France) Jean Thirouin
August 23	Poznań, Poland; Clay; M25; Singles and Doubles Draws	(Argentina) Román Andrés Burruchaga; 5–7, 6–3, 6–2	(Poland) Paweł Ciaś	(Japan) Shintaro Mochizuki (Argentina) Matías Zukas	(United Kingdom) Felix Gill (Brazil) Igor Marcondes (Argentina) Alejo Lorenzo Lingua Lavallén (Poland) Michał Mikuła
August 23	Poznań, Poland; Clay; M25; Singles and Doubles Draws	(Sweden) Filip Bergevi (Sweden) Markus Eriksson; Walkover	(Argentina) Leonardo Aboian (Argentina) Valerio Aboian	(Japan) Shintaro Mochizuki (Argentina) Matías Zukas	(United Kingdom) Felix Gill (Brazil) Igor Marcondes (Argentina) Alejo Lorenzo Lingua Lavallén (Poland) Michał Mikuła
August 23	Santander, Spain; Clay; M25; Singles and Doubles Draws	(Spain) Nicolás Álvarez Varona; 7–6^{(7–1)}, 2–6, 6–2	(Spain) Àlex Martí Pujolràs	(Argentina) Juan Bautista Torres (Spain) Imanol López Morillo	(Spain) Carlos Sánchez Jover (Japan) Rio Noguchi (Spain) Pol Martín Tiffon (Brazil) Oscar José Gutierrez
August 23	Santander, Spain; Clay; M25; Singles and Doubles Draws	(Brazil) Oscar José Gutierrez (Brazil) Gabriel Roveri Sidney; 6–4, 6–2	(Russia) Ivan Gakhov (Ukraine) Georgii Kravchenko	(Argentina) Juan Bautista Torres (Spain) Imanol López Morillo	(Spain) Carlos Sánchez Jover (Japan) Rio Noguchi (Spain) Pol Martín Tiffon (Brazil) Oscar José Gutierrez
August 23	Caslano, Switzerland; Clay; M25; Singles and Doubles Draws	(France) Calvin Hemery; 6–4, 4–6, 6–4	(Switzerland) Rémy Bertola	(Colombia) Alejandro González (Switzerland) Antoine Bellier	(United States) Patrick Kypson (Brazil) Mateus Alves (Germany) Tobias Simon (Italy) Alexander Weis
August 23	Caslano, Switzerland; Clay; M25; Singles and Doubles Draws	(Switzerland) Jakub Paul (Switzerland) Leandro Riedi; 6–0, 6–4	(United States) Jack Vance (United States) Jamie Vance	(Colombia) Alejandro González (Switzerland) Antoine Bellier	(United States) Patrick Kypson (Brazil) Mateus Alves (Germany) Tobias Simon (Italy) Alexander Weis
August 23	Bad Waltersdorf, Austria; Clay; M15; Singles and Doubles Draws	(Germany) Timo Stodder; 6–3, 6–2	(Austria) Lukas Krainer	(Slovenia) Tom Kočevar-Dešman (Brazil) Gabriel Décamps	(Italy) Fausto Tabacco (Italy) Alessandro Pecci (Croatia) Alen Rogić Hadžalić (Austria) Neil Oberleitner
August 23	Bad Waltersdorf, Austria; Clay; M15; Singles and Doubles Draws	(Austria) Lukas Neumayer (Austria) Neil Oberleitner; 5–7, 6–3, [10–7]	(Croatia) Admir Kalender (Austria) Lukas Krainer	(Slovenia) Tom Kočevar-Dešman (Brazil) Gabriel Décamps	(Italy) Fausto Tabacco (Italy) Alessandro Pecci (Croatia) Alen Rogić Hadžalić (Austria) Neil Oberleitner
August 23	Huy, Belgium; Clay; M15; Singles and Doubles Draws	(Netherlands) Guy den Ouden; 4–6, 7–5, 6–1	(Belgium) Gauthier Onclin	(France) Alexis Gautier (Belgium) Raphaël Collignon	(Netherlands) Deney Wassermann (Ecuador) Antonio Cayetano March (United Kingdom) Arthur Fery (Belgium) Benjamin D'Hoe
August 23	Huy, Belgium; Clay; M15; Singles and Doubles Draws	(Syria) Hazem Naw (Germany) John Sperle; 6–3, 7–5	(United Kingdom) Jonathan Binding (United Kingdom) Mark Whitehouse	(France) Alexis Gautier (Belgium) Raphaël Collignon	(Netherlands) Deney Wassermann (Ecuador) Antonio Cayetano March (United Kingdom) Arthur Fery (Belgium) Benjamin D'Hoe
August 23	Bratislava, Slovakia; Clay; M15; Singles and Doubles Draws	(Hungary) Máté Valkusz; 6–0, 6–2	(Ukraine) Danylo Kalenichenko	(United States) Vasil Kirkov (Czech Republic) Pavel Nejedlý	(Italy) Edoardo Lavagno (Italy) Biagio Gramaticopolo (Argentina) Mariano Navone (Romania) Ștefan Paloși
August 23	Bratislava, Slovakia; Clay; M15; Singles and Doubles Draws	(Sweden) Simon Freund (United States) Vasil Kirkov; 6–1, 6–0	(Argentina) Mariano Navone (Italy) Francesco Vilardo	(United States) Vasil Kirkov (Czech Republic) Pavel Nejedlý	(Italy) Edoardo Lavagno (Italy) Biagio Gramaticopolo (Argentina) Mariano Navone (Romania) Ștefan Paloși
August 23	Monastir, Tunisia; Hard; M15; Singles and Doubles Draws	(Australia) Li Tu; 6–1, 6–1	(Argentina) Mateo Nicolás Martínez	(France) Robin Bertrand (Japan) Renta Tokuda	(United States) Felix Corwin (United States) Kyle Seelig (United States) Ezekiel Clark (United States) Gage Brymer
August 23	Monastir, Tunisia; Hard; M15; Singles and Doubles Draws	(Australia) Jeremy Beale (Australia) Thomas Fancutt; 6–4, 7–6^{(7–4)}	(Lebanon) Hady Habib (Argentina) Mateo Nicolás Martínez	(France) Robin Bertrand (Japan) Renta Tokuda	(United States) Felix Corwin (United States) Kyle Seelig (United States) Ezekiel Clark (United States) Gage Brymer
August 30	Říčany, Czech Republic; Clay; M25; Singles and Doubles Draws	(Hungary) Zsombor Piros; 6–3, 3–6, 6–3	(Israel) Yshai Oliel	(Czech Republic) Robin Staněk (United Kingdom) Ryan Peniston	(Brazil) Orlando Luz (Argentina) Facundo Díaz Acosta (Brazil) Mateus Alves (Czech Republic) Marek Gengel
August 30	Říčany, Czech Republic; Clay; M25; Singles and Doubles Draws	(United States) Toby Kodat (Czech Republic) Adam Pavlásek; 6–3, 7–5	(Bulgaria) Alexander Donski (Northern Mariana Islands) Colin Sinclair	(Czech Republic) Robin Staněk (United Kingdom) Ryan Peniston	(Brazil) Orlando Luz (Argentina) Facundo Díaz Acosta (Brazil) Mateus Alves (Czech Republic) Marek Gengel
August 30	Bagnères-de-Bigorre, France; Hard; M25; Singles and Doubles Draws	(France) Antoine Escoffier; 7–6^{(7–4)}, 6–0	(United Kingdom) Millen Hurrion	(France) Kenny de Schepper (France) Arthur Fils	(Zimbabwe) Benjamin Lock (France) Lisandru Rodriguez (France) Titouan Droguet (Chinese Taipei) Hsu Yu-hsiou
August 30	Bagnères-de-Bigorre, France; Hard; M25; Singles and Doubles Draws	(United Kingdom) Alastair Gray (United Kingdom) Ryan James Storrie; 3–6, 6–4, [10–8]	(France) Clément Chidekh (France) Luca Sanchez	(France) Kenny de Schepper (France) Arthur Fils	(Zimbabwe) Benjamin Lock (France) Lisandru Rodriguez (France) Titouan Droguet (Chinese Taipei) Hsu Yu-hsiou
August 30	Oviedo, Spain; Clay; M25; Singles and Doubles Draws	(Spain) Oriol Roca Batalla; 7–6^{(7–2)}, 6–1	(Spain) Álvaro López San Martín	(Peru) Nicolás Álvarez (Spain) Alejandro García	(Spain) Miguel Damas (Chile) Michel Vernier (Switzerland) Johan Nikles (Brazil) Oscar José Gutierrez
August 30	Oviedo, Spain; Clay; M25; Singles and Doubles Draws	(Brazil) Oscar José Gutierrez (Spain) Carlos López Montagud; 7–6^{(7–5)}, 6–3	(Chile) Miguel Fernando Pereira (Argentina) Juan Bautista Torres	(Peru) Nicolás Álvarez (Spain) Alejandro García	(Spain) Miguel Damas (Chile) Michel Vernier (Switzerland) Johan Nikles (Brazil) Oscar José Gutierrez
August 30	Sierre, Switzerland; Clay; M25; Singles and Doubles Draws	(Australia) Rinky Hijikata; 7–6^{(8–6)}, 6–1	(United States) Oliver Crawford	(Switzerland) Rémy Bertola (United States) Patrick Kypson	(France) Calvin Hemery (Switzerland) Luca Castelnuovo (Italy) Jacopo Berrettini (France) Valentin Vacherot
August 30	Sierre, Switzerland; Clay; M25; Singles and Doubles Draws	(Switzerland) Jakub Paul (Switzerland) Yannik Steinegger; 6–3, 6–2	(Switzerland) Rémy Bertola (Switzerland) Luca Castelnuovo	(Switzerland) Rémy Bertola (United States) Patrick Kypson	(France) Calvin Hemery (Switzerland) Luca Castelnuovo (Italy) Jacopo Berrettini (France) Valentin Vacherot
August 30	Bad Waltersdorf, Austria; Clay; M15; Singles and Doubles Draws	(Germany) Timo Stodder; 6–3, 6–4	(Slovenia) Matic Špec	(Italy) Omar Giacalone (Austria) David Pichler	(Russia) Evgenii Tiurnev (Austria) Lukas Neumayer (Italy) Fausto Tabacco (Slovenia) Tomás Lipovšek Puches
August 30	Bad Waltersdorf, Austria; Clay; M15; Singles and Doubles Draws	(Austria) Lukas Neumayer (Austria) Neil Oberleitner; 1–6, 6–0, [10–5]	(Austria) Lenny Hampel (Austria) David Pichler	(Italy) Omar Giacalone (Austria) David Pichler	(Russia) Evgenii Tiurnev (Austria) Lukas Neumayer (Italy) Fausto Tabacco (Slovenia) Tomás Lipovšek Puches
August 30	Cairo, Egypt; Clay; M15; Singles and Doubles Draws	(Italy) Alessandro Ragazzi; 7–6^{(7–5)}, 6–2	(Japan) Ryota Tanuma	(Argentina) Valerio Aboian (France) Quentin Folliot	(Egypt) Karim-Mohamed Maamoun (Poland) Marcel Kamrowski (Italy) Manfred Fellin (Argentina) Lorenzo Gagliardo
August 30	Cairo, Egypt; Clay; M15; Singles and Doubles Draws	(Argentina) Leonardo Aboian (Argentina) Valerio Aboian; 7–6^{(9–7)}, 6–4	(France) Maxime Mora (Brazil) Gabriel Roveri Sidney	(Argentina) Valerio Aboian (France) Quentin Folliot	(Egypt) Karim-Mohamed Maamoun (Poland) Marcel Kamrowski (Italy) Manfred Fellin (Argentina) Lorenzo Gagliardo
August 30	Allershausen, Germany; Clay; M15; Singles and Doubles Draws	(Netherlands) Guy den Ouden; 6–0, 6–4	(Netherlands) Mick Veldheer	(Germany) Mats Rosenkranz (Spain) David Jordà Sanchis	(Argentina) Juan Ignacio Galarza (Germany) Dominik Böhler (India) Manish Sureshkumar (Germany) Tim Handel
August 30	Allershausen, Germany; Clay; M15; Singles and Doubles Draws	(Germany) Niklas Schell (Germany) Constantin Schmitz; 7–6^{(7–5)}, 6–3	(Germany) Benito Sanchez Martinez (Germany) Milan Welte	(Germany) Mats Rosenkranz (Spain) David Jordà Sanchis	(Argentina) Juan Ignacio Galarza (Germany) Dominik Böhler (India) Manish Sureshkumar (Germany) Tim Handel
August 30	Ulcinj, Montenegro; Clay; M15; Singles and Doubles Draws	(Hungary) Gergely Madarász; 4–6, 6–1, 6–3	(Argentina) Juan Pablo Paz	(Ukraine) Eric Vanshelboim (Uruguay) Ignacio Carou	(Montenegro) Rrezart Cungu (Argentina) Alejo Lorenzo Lingua Lavallén (Bulgaria) Gabriel Donev (Ecuador) Antonio Cayetano March
August 30	Ulcinj, Montenegro; Clay; M15; Singles and Doubles Draws	(Argentina) Juan Pablo Paz (Ukraine) Eric Vanshelboim; 6–3, 6–3	(Bulgaria) Gabriel Donev (Bulgaria) Simon Anthony Ivanov	(Ukraine) Eric Vanshelboim (Uruguay) Ignacio Carou	(Montenegro) Rrezart Cungu (Argentina) Alejo Lorenzo Lingua Lavallén (Bulgaria) Gabriel Donev (Ecuador) Antonio Cayetano March
August 30	Žilina, Slovakia; Clay; M15; Singles and Doubles Draws	(Hungary) Fábián Marozsán; 1–6, 6–3, 6–1	(Chile) Bastián Malla	(Spain) Adrià Soriano Barrera (Argentina) Mariano Navone	(Austria) Peter Goldsteiner (Hungary) Zsombor Velcz (Italy) Edoardo Lavagno (Slovakia) Lukáš Pokorný
August 30	Žilina, Slovakia; Clay; M15; Singles and Doubles Draws	(Argentina) Mariano Navone (Italy) Francesco Vilardo; 4–6, 6–1, [10–7]	(Czech Republic) Jan Jermář (Czech Republic) Štěpán Pecák	(Spain) Adrià Soriano Barrera (Argentina) Mariano Navone	(Austria) Peter Goldsteiner (Hungary) Zsombor Velcz (Italy) Edoardo Lavagno (Slovakia) Lukáš Pokorný
August 30	Monastir, Tunisia; Hard; M15; Singles and Doubles Draws	(Japan) Renta Tokuda; 7–5, 6–0	(United States) Kyle Seelig	(Australia) Li Tu (Japan) Yuki Mochizuki	(United Kingdom) Stuart Parker (Australia) Dane Sweeny (Lebanon) Hady Habib (Spain) Max Alcalá Gurri
August 30	Monastir, Tunisia; Hard; M15; Singles and Doubles Draws	(Australia) Jeremy Beale (Australia) Li Tu; 6–4, 6–2	(Denmark) August Holmgren (Denmark) Johannes Ingildsen	(Australia) Li Tu (Japan) Yuki Mochizuki	(United Kingdom) Stuart Parker (Australia) Dane Sweeny (Lebanon) Hady Habib (Spain) Max Alcalá Gurri
August 30	Chornomorsk, Ukraine; Clay; M15; Singles and Doubles Draws	(Ukraine) Illya Beloborodko; 7–6^{(7–3)}, 7–6^{(8–6)}	(Moldova) Ilya Snițari	(Kazakhstan) Denis Yevseyev (Russia) Yan Bondarevskiy	(Ukraine) Oleg Prihodko (Italy) Federico Campana (Ukraine) Artem Podorozhnyi (Lithuania) Julius Tverijonas
August 30	Chornomorsk, Ukraine; Clay; M15; Singles and Doubles Draws	(Kazakhstan) Grigoriy Lomakin (Ukraine) Vladyslav Manafov; 7–6^{(7–5)}, 4–6, [10–8]	(Russia) Yan Bondarevskiy (Ukraine) Oleg Prihodko	(Kazakhstan) Denis Yevseyev (Russia) Yan Bondarevskiy	(Ukraine) Oleg Prihodko (Italy) Federico Campana (Ukraine) Artem Podorozhnyi (Lithuania) Julius Tverijonas

=== September ===
Week of	Tournament	Winner	Runners-up	Semifinalists	Quarterfinalists
September 6	Eupen, Belgium; Clay; M25; Singles and Doubles Draws	(Argentina) Facundo Díaz Acosta; 7–6^{(8–6)}, 6–2	(Italy) Matteo Arnaldi	(United Kingdom) Arthur Fery (Belgium) Maxime Pauwels	(Belgium) Romain Faucon (Belgium) Simon Beaupain (Argentina) Mariano Kestelboim (Northern Mariana Islands) Colin Sinclair
September 6	Eupen, Belgium; Clay; M25; Singles and Doubles Draws	(Germany) Niklas Schell (Germany) Kai Wehnelt; 7–6^{(7–3)}, 6–3	(Belgium) Benjamin D'Hoe (Northern Mariana Islands) Colin Sinclair	(United Kingdom) Arthur Fery (Belgium) Maxime Pauwels	(Belgium) Romain Faucon (Belgium) Simon Beaupain (Argentina) Mariano Kestelboim (Northern Mariana Islands) Colin Sinclair
September 6	Sintra, Portugal; Hard; M25; Singles and Doubles Draws	(United Kingdom) Paul Jubb; 7–5, 6–4	(Argentina) Santiago Rodríguez Taverna	(Portugal) Luís Faria (Portugal) Duarte Vale	(United States) Felix Corwin (United States) Govind Nanda (Japan) Yuta Shimizu (Spain) John Echeverría
September 6	Sintra, Portugal; Hard; M25; Singles and Doubles Draws	(France) Dan Added (United Kingdom) Evan Hoyt; 6–7^{(8–10)}, 6–2, [10–6]	(Brazil) Mateus Alves (Brazil) Leonardo Civita-Telles	(Portugal) Luís Faria (Portugal) Duarte Vale	(United States) Felix Corwin (United States) Govind Nanda (Japan) Yuta Shimizu (Spain) John Echeverría
September 6	Ibagué, Colombia; Clay; M15; Singles and Doubles Draws	(Brazil) Gustavo Heide; 7–6^{(10–8)}, 7–5	(Colombia) Alejandro Gómez	(Colombia) Juan Sebastián Gómez (Mexico) Alex Hernández	(United Kingdom) Blu Baker (Colombia) Alejandro Hoyos Franco (Mexico) Gerardo López Villaseñor (Bolivia) Alejandro Mendoza
September 6	Ibagué, Colombia; Clay; M15; Singles and Doubles Draws	(Bolivia) Boris Arias (Bolivia) Murkel Dellien; 6–4, 3–6, [10–4]	(Colombia) Alejandro Gómez (Colombia) Alejandro Hoyos Franco	(Colombia) Juan Sebastián Gómez (Mexico) Alex Hernández	(United Kingdom) Blu Baker (Colombia) Alejandro Hoyos Franco (Mexico) Gerardo López Villaseñor (Bolivia) Alejandro Mendoza
September 6	Cairo, Egypt; Clay; M15; Singles and Doubles Draws	(Argentina) Santiago de la Fuente; 3–6, 6–2, 2–0, ret.	(Italy) Alessandro Ragazzi	(France) Maxime Mora (Italy) Biagio Gramaticopolo	(France) Quentin Folliot (United States) Jakub Wojcik (Italy) Luca Tomasetto (Spain) Bruno Pujol Navarro
September 6	Cairo, Egypt; Clay; M15; Singles and Doubles Draws	(Argentina) Leonardo Aboian (Argentina) Valerio Aboian; 6–3, 7–6^{(7–3)}	(Japan) Ryota Tanuma (Japan) Seita Watanabe	(France) Maxime Mora (Italy) Biagio Gramaticopolo	(France) Quentin Folliot (United States) Jakub Wojcik (Italy) Luca Tomasetto (Spain) Bruno Pujol Navarro
September 6	Ulcinj, Montenegro; Clay; M15; Singles and Doubles Draws	(Chile) Bastián Malla; 6–2, 6–2	(Argentina) Mariano Navone	(Italy) Edoardo Lavagno (Ukraine) Oleksandr Ovcharenko	(Bulgaria) Gabriel Donev (Argentina) Juan Pablo Paz (Argentina) Alejo Lorenzo Lingua Lavallén (Russia) Savriyan Danilov
September 6	Ulcinj, Montenegro; Clay; M15; Singles and Doubles Draws	(Argentina) Alejo Lorenzo Lingua Lavallén (Argentina) Mariano Navone; 6–3, 6–2	(Russia) Egor Agafonov (Russia) Daniel Ibragimov	(Italy) Edoardo Lavagno (Ukraine) Oleksandr Ovcharenko	(Bulgaria) Gabriel Donev (Argentina) Juan Pablo Paz (Argentina) Alejo Lorenzo Lingua Lavallén (Russia) Savriyan Danilov
September 6	Monastir, Tunisia; Hard; M15; Singles and Doubles Draws	(Australia) Jeremy Beale; 6–4, 6–4	(United States) Gage Brymer	(Australia) Dane Sweeny (Denmark) Christian Sigsgaard	(United States) Ezekiel Clark (Italy) Mattia Bellucci (Japan) Masamichi Imamura (Russia) Marat Sharipov
September 6	Monastir, Tunisia; Hard; M15; Singles and Doubles Draws	(Italy) Mattia Bellucci (New Zealand) Ajeet Rai; 7–6^{(7–1)}, 6–7^{(5–7)}, [10–4]	(Brazil) Gabriel Décamps (Germany) Robert Strombachs	(Australia) Dane Sweeny (Denmark) Christian Sigsgaard	(United States) Ezekiel Clark (Italy) Mattia Bellucci (Japan) Masamichi Imamura (Russia) Marat Sharipov
September 13	Medellín, Colombia; Clay; M25; Singles and Doubles Draws	(Brazil) Gilbert Klier Júnior; 6–2, 6–2	(Brazil) João Lucas Reis da Silva	(Brazil) Pedro Sakamoto (Mexico) Gerardo López Villaseñor	(Mexico) Alex Hernández (Argentina) Alan Kohen (Brazil) José Pereira (Colombia) Juan Sebastián Gómez
September 13	Medellín, Colombia; Clay; M25; Singles and Doubles Draws	(Brazil) João Lucas Reis da Silva (Brazil) Gilbert Klier Júnior; 6–4, 4–6, [10–8]	(Brazil) Pedro Boscardin Dias (Brazil) Gustavo Heide	(Brazil) Pedro Sakamoto (Mexico) Gerardo López Villaseñor	(Mexico) Alex Hernández (Argentina) Alan Kohen (Brazil) José Pereira (Colombia) Juan Sebastián Gómez
September 13	Plaisir, France; Hard (indoor); M25+H; Singles and Doubles Draws	(Australia) Tristan Schoolkate; 6–4, 7–5	(France) Alexandre Reco	(Switzerland) Antoine Bellier (United States) Vasil Kirkov	(France) Lény Mitjana (France) Jules Marie (France) Thomas Laurent (Bulgaria) Alexander Donski
September 13	Plaisir, France; Hard (indoor); M25+H; Singles and Doubles Draws	(Germany) Hendrik Jebens (Germany) Niklas Schell; 6–2, 7–6^{(7–0)}	(Sweden) Filip Bergevi (France) Arthur Reymond	(Switzerland) Antoine Bellier (United States) Vasil Kirkov	(France) Lény Mitjana (France) Jules Marie (France) Thomas Laurent (Bulgaria) Alexander Donski
September 13	Sintra, Portugal; Hard; M25; Singles and Doubles Draws	(United Kingdom) Paul Jubb; 6–0, 6–2	(Spain) Alejandro Moro Cañas	(Argentina) Santiago Rodríguez Taverna (Spain) Adrià Soriano Barrera	(Japan) Yuta Shimizu (Portugal) Francisco Cabral (United States) Felix Corwin (United States) Govind Nanda
September 13	Sintra, Portugal; Hard; M25; Singles and Doubles Draws	(Portugal) Francisco Cabral (Germany) Sebastian Fanselow; 4–6, 6–3, [10–8]	(Mexico) Luis Patiño (Argentina) Santiago Rodríguez Taverna	(Argentina) Santiago Rodríguez Taverna (Spain) Adrià Soriano Barrera	(Japan) Yuta Shimizu (Portugal) Francisco Cabral (United States) Felix Corwin (United States) Govind Nanda
September 13	Johannesburg, South Africa; Hard; M25; Singles and Doubles Draws	(United Kingdom) Alastair Gray; 7–6^{(7–4)}, 6–4	(Australia) Jeremy Beale	(South Africa) Dylan Salton (Israel) Sahar Simon	(United States) Alafia Ayeni (South Africa) Vaughn Hunter (Zimbabwe) Benjamin Lock (Canada) Filip Peliwo
September 13	Johannesburg, South Africa; Hard; M25; Singles and Doubles Draws	(Israel) Daniel Cukierman (United Kingdom) Alastair Gray; 7–6^{(7–5)}, 6–3	(Brazil) Mateus Alves (Brazil) Igor Marcondes	(South Africa) Dylan Salton (Israel) Sahar Simon	(United States) Alafia Ayeni (South Africa) Vaughn Hunter (Zimbabwe) Benjamin Lock (Canada) Filip Peliwo
September 13	Madrid, Spain; Clay; M25; Singles and Doubles Draws	(Italy) Luca Nardi; 7–5, 6–2	(Germany) Louis Wessels	(Spain) Nikolás Sánchez Izquierdo (Spain) Carlos López Montagud	(Spain) Pablo Llamas Ruiz (Austria) Filip Misolic (France) Valentin Lapalu (Italy) Omar Giacalone
September 13	Madrid, Spain; Clay; M25; Singles and Doubles Draws	(Spain) Roberto Ortega Olmedo (Spain) Carlos Sánchez Jover; 6–4, 6–2	(Argentina) Juan Ignacio Galarza (Argentina) Mariano Kestelboim	(Spain) Nikolás Sánchez Izquierdo (Spain) Carlos López Montagud	(Spain) Pablo Llamas Ruiz (Austria) Filip Misolic (France) Valentin Lapalu (Italy) Omar Giacalone
September 13	Sozopol, Bulgaria; Hard; M15; Singles and Doubles Draws	(United Kingdom) Ryan James Storrie; 6–4, 0–6, 6–2	(Germany) Kai Wehnelt	(Czech Republic) Martin Krumich (France) Valentin Vacherot	(Romania) Călin Manda (Italy) Tommaso Compagnucci (Romania) Petru-Alexandru Luncanu (Bulgaria) Simon Anthony Ivanov
September 13	Sozopol, Bulgaria; Hard; M15; Singles and Doubles Draws	(Romania) Petru-Alexandru Luncanu (Germany) Kai Wehnelt; 6–3, 6–3	(Serbia) Boris Butulija (Russia) Ivan Mikhaylyuk	(Czech Republic) Martin Krumich (France) Valentin Vacherot	(Romania) Călin Manda (Italy) Tommaso Compagnucci (Romania) Petru-Alexandru Luncanu (Bulgaria) Simon Anthony Ivanov
September 13	Cairo, Egypt; Clay; M15; Singles and Doubles Draws	(Argentina) Leonardo Aboian; 6–2, 6–2	(Italy) Simone Roncalli	(France) Nathan Seateun (France) Quentin Folliot	(Italy) Luca Tomasetto (United States) Jakub Wojcik (Italy) Andrea Picchione (Germany) Dominik Böhler
September 13	Cairo, Egypt; Clay; M15; Singles and Doubles Draws	(India) Rishab Agarwal (Spain) Diego Augusto Barreto Sánchez; 6–2, 7–5	(Argentina) Leonardo Aboian (Argentina) Valerio Aboian	(France) Nathan Seateun (France) Quentin Folliot	(Italy) Luca Tomasetto (United States) Jakub Wojcik (Italy) Andrea Picchione (Germany) Dominik Böhler
September 13	Ulcinj, Montenegro; Clay; M15; Singles and Doubles Draws	(Argentina) Alejo Lorenzo Lingua Lavallén; 6–3, 6–2	(United Kingdom) Felix Gill	(Argentina) Mariano Navone (France) Timo Legout	(Montenegro) Rrezart Cungu (Italy) Alessandro Ingarao (Italy) Samuel Vincent Ruggeri (Argentina) Juan Pablo Paz
September 13	Ulcinj, Montenegro; Clay; M15; Singles and Doubles Draws	(Ukraine) Marat Deviatiarov (Netherlands) Max Houkes; 7–5, 6–1	(Italy) Andrea Basso (Italy) Gianmarco Ferrari	(Argentina) Mariano Navone (France) Timo Legout	(Montenegro) Rrezart Cungu (Italy) Alessandro Ingarao (Italy) Samuel Vincent Ruggeri (Argentina) Juan Pablo Paz
September 13	Zlatibor, Serbia; Clay; M15; Singles and Doubles Draws	(Hungary) Fábián Marozsán; 6–4, 2–1, ret.	(Serbia) Marko Tepavac	(Russia) Yan Bondarevskiy (Hungary) Gergely Madarász	(Ukraine) Oleg Prihodko (Hungary) Zsombor Velcz (Hungary) Péter Nagy (Ukraine) Oleksandr Ovcharenko
September 13	Zlatibor, Serbia; Clay; M15; Singles and Doubles Draws	(Russia) Yan Bondarevskiy (Ukraine) Oleg Prihodko; 1–6, 6–0, [10–7]	(Hungary) Gergely Madarász (Hungary) Péter Nagy	(Russia) Yan Bondarevskiy (Hungary) Gergely Madarász	(Ukraine) Oleg Prihodko (Hungary) Zsombor Velcz (Hungary) Péter Nagy (Ukraine) Oleksandr Ovcharenko
September 13	Monastir, Tunisia; Hard; M15; Singles and Doubles Draws	(Australia) Li Tu; 6–2, 6–1	(Brazil) Gabriel Décamps	(United States) Gage Brymer (Japan) Ryota Tanuma	(France) Amaury Raynel (India) Abhinav Sanjeev Shanmugam (Australia) Blake Ellis (France) Axel Garcian
September 13	Monastir, Tunisia; Hard; M15; Singles and Doubles Draws	(New Zealand) Ajeet Rai (Australia) Li Tu; 6–0, 6–4	(France) Martin Breysach (France) Lilian Marmousez	(United States) Gage Brymer (Japan) Ryota Tanuma	(France) Amaury Raynel (India) Abhinav Sanjeev Shanmugam (Australia) Blake Ellis (France) Axel Garcian
September 13	Champaign, United States; Hard; M15; Singles and Doubles Draws	(United States) Martin Damm; 6–3, 3–6, 6–2	(Romania) Gabi Adrian Boitan	(United States) Cannon Kingsley (United States) John McNally	(United States) Drew Baird (United States) Dali Blanch (United States) Omni Kumar (United States) Nathan Ponwith
September 13	Champaign, United States; Hard; M15; Singles and Doubles Draws	(United States) Kweisi Kenyatte (Latvia) Kārlis Ozoliņš; 7–5, 2–6, [10–7]	(United States) Nathan Ponwith (United States) Ryan Shane	(United States) Cannon Kingsley (United States) John McNally	(United States) Drew Baird (United States) Dali Blanch (United States) Omni Kumar (United States) Nathan Ponwith
September 20	Pardubice, Czech Republic; Clay; M25; Singles and Doubles Draws	(Austria) Filip Misolic; 7–5, 6–3	(Germany) Henri Squire	(Ukraine) Eric Vanshelboim (Italy) Alexander Weis	(Czech Republic) Robin Staněk (Italy) Luca Nardi (Czech Republic) Pavel Nejedlý (Poland) Maciej Rajski
September 20	Pardubice, Czech Republic; Clay; M25; Singles and Doubles Draws	(Czech Republic) Antonín Bolardt (Czech Republic) Andrew Paulson; 6–4, 3–6, [10–8]	(Czech Republic) Filip Duda (Czech Republic) Adam Pavlásek	(Ukraine) Eric Vanshelboim (Italy) Alexander Weis	(Czech Republic) Robin Staněk (Italy) Luca Nardi (Czech Republic) Pavel Nejedlý (Poland) Maciej Rajski
September 20	Johannesburg, South Africa; Hard; M25; Singles and Doubles Draws	(United Kingdom) Alastair Gray; 4–6, 6–3, 6–2	(Greece) Michail Pervolarakis	(Brazil) Mateus Alves (Zimbabwe) Benjamin Lock	(South Africa) Alec Beckley (South Africa) Khololwam Montsi (Japan) Rio Noguchi (United States) Kyle Seelig
September 20	Johannesburg, South Africa; Hard; M25; Singles and Doubles Draws	(South Africa) Alec Beckley (South Africa) Vaughn Hunter; 6–1, 7–6^{(7–5)}	(Greece) Markos Kalovelonis (Greece) Michail Pervolarakis	(Brazil) Mateus Alves (Zimbabwe) Benjamin Lock	(South Africa) Alec Beckley (South Africa) Khololwam Montsi (Japan) Rio Noguchi (United States) Kyle Seelig
September 20	Jönköping, Sweden; Hard (indoor); M25; Singles and Doubles Draws	(Finland) Otto Virtanen; 6–4, 6–0	(Norway) Viktor Durasovic	(Russia) Evgeny Karlovskiy (Japan) Shintaro Imai	(Uzbekistan) Khumoyun Sultanov (Japan) Renta Tokuda (Germany) Marvin Möller (Sweden) Filip Bergevi
September 20	Jönköping, Sweden; Hard (indoor); M25; Singles and Doubles Draws	(Japan) Yuta Shimizu (Uzbekistan) Khumoyun Sultanov; 6–4, 4–6, [10–6]	(Poland) Michał Dembek (Germany) Marvin Möller	(Russia) Evgeny Karlovskiy (Japan) Shintaro Imai	(Uzbekistan) Khumoyun Sultanov (Japan) Renta Tokuda (Germany) Marvin Möller (Sweden) Filip Bergevi
September 20	Recife, Brazil; Clay (indoor); M15; Singles and Doubles Draws	(Brazil) Gustavo Heide; 6–4, 6–2	(Brazil) José Pereira	(Brazil) Eduardo Ribeiro (Brazil) Pedro Boscardin Dias	(Brazil) Nicolas Zanellato (Brazil) Daniel Dutra da Silva (Brazil) Wilson Leite (Brazil) Marcelo Zormann
September 20	Recife, Brazil; Clay (indoor); M15; Singles and Doubles Draws	(Brazil) Pedro Boscardin Dias (Brazil) Gustavo Heide; 7–6^{(7–1)}, 3–6, [10–8]	(Brazil) Daniel Dutra da Silva (Brazil) Marcelo Zormann	(Brazil) Eduardo Ribeiro (Brazil) Pedro Boscardin Dias	(Brazil) Nicolas Zanellato (Brazil) Daniel Dutra da Silva (Brazil) Wilson Leite (Brazil) Marcelo Zormann
September 20	Cairo, Egypt; Clay; M15; Singles and Doubles Draws	(Italy) Simone Roncalli; 6–1, 6–2	(Italy) Edoardo Lavagno	(Italy) Gabriele Maria Noce (United Kingdom) Billy Harris	(Argentina) Valerio Aboian (Argentina) Fermín Tenti (Italy) Emiliano Maggioli (Italy) Francesco Passaro
September 20	Cairo, Egypt; Clay; M15; Singles and Doubles Draws	(Italy) Emiliano Maggioli (Italy) Gian Marco Ortenzi; 6–2, 6–7^{(0–7)}, [10–7]	(Germany) Maik Steiner (Ukraine) Volodymyr Uzhylovskyi	(Italy) Gabriele Maria Noce (United Kingdom) Billy Harris	(Argentina) Valerio Aboian (Argentina) Fermín Tenti (Italy) Emiliano Maggioli (Italy) Francesco Passaro
September 20	Cancún, Mexico; Hard; M15; Singles and Doubles Draws	(France) Jaimee Floyd Angele; 6–1, 6–1	(Mexico) Gerardo López Villaseñor	(Argentina) Federico Agustín Gómez (Republic of Ireland) Osgar O'Hoisin	(Mexico) Alex Hernández (Brazil) Luís Britto (Brazil) Leonardo Civita-Telles (United States) Miles Jones
September 20	Cancún, Mexico; Hard; M15; Singles and Doubles Draws	(United States) Dali Blanch (France) Tom Jomby; 6–4, 7–5	(United States) Nicholas Bybel (Costa Rica) Jesse Flores	(Argentina) Federico Agustín Gómez (Republic of Ireland) Osgar O'Hoisin	(Mexico) Alex Hernández (Brazil) Luís Britto (Brazil) Leonardo Civita-Telles (United States) Miles Jones
September 20	Ulcinj, Montenegro; Clay; M15; Singles and Doubles Draws	(Montenegro) Rrezart Cungu; 6–3, 2–6, 6–1	(Italy) Samuel Vincent Ruggeri	(Argentina) Franco Emanuel Egea (Argentina) Mariano Navone	(France) Titouan Droguet (Netherlands) Max Houkes (France) Alexis Musialek (Argentina) Juan Pablo Paz
September 20	Ulcinj, Montenegro; Clay; M15; Singles and Doubles Draws	(Italy) Marcello Serafini (Italy) Samuel Vincent Ruggeri; 6–3, 6–2	(Australia) William Ma (Australia) Matthew Romios	(Argentina) Franco Emanuel Egea (Argentina) Mariano Navone	(France) Titouan Droguet (Netherlands) Max Houkes (France) Alexis Musialek (Argentina) Juan Pablo Paz
September 20	Pirot, Serbia; Clay; M15; Singles and Doubles Draws	(France) Luka Pavlovic; 6–2, 6–2	(Romania) Cezar Crețu	(Bosnia and Herzegovina) Aldin Šetkić (Russia) Andrey Chepelev	(Italy) Federico Iannaccone (Russia) Savva Polukhin (Serbia) Kristijan Juhas (Romania) Călin Manda
September 20	Pirot, Serbia; Clay; M15; Singles and Doubles Draws	(Spain) David Jordà Sanchis (Ukraine) Oleksandr Ovcharenko; 6–1, 6–4	(Italy) Luigi Sorrentino (Italy) Lorenzo Vatteroni	(Bosnia and Herzegovina) Aldin Šetkić (Russia) Andrey Chepelev	(Italy) Federico Iannaccone (Russia) Savva Polukhin (Serbia) Kristijan Juhas (Romania) Călin Manda
September 20	Melilla, Spain; Clay; M15; Singles and Doubles Draws	(Spain) Àlex Martí Pujolràs; 6–4, 2–0, ret.	(Spain) Carlos López Montagud	(Spain) Daniel Rincón (Spain) Miguel Damas	(Spain) Óscar Mesquida Berg (Spain) Francisco Andreu García (Spain) Mario González Fernández (Spain) Alejandro Manzanera Pertusa
September 20	Melilla, Spain; Clay; M15; Singles and Doubles Draws	(Spain) Óscar Mesquida Berg (Chile) Miguel Fernando Pereira; 6–2, 6–7^{(3–7)}, [11–9]	(Lithuania) Edas Butvilas (Spain) Alejandro Manzanera Pertusa	(Spain) Daniel Rincón (Spain) Miguel Damas	(Spain) Óscar Mesquida Berg (Spain) Francisco Andreu García (Spain) Mario González Fernández (Spain) Alejandro Manzanera Pertusa
September 20	Monastir, Tunisia; Hard; M15; Singles and Doubles Draws	(Australia) Li Tu; 3–6, 6–1, 6–2	(Japan) Ryota Tanuma	(Germany) Christoph Negritu (Italy) Omar Brigida	(France) Ugo Blanchet (Italy) Giovanni Oradini (Burundi) Guy Orly Iradukunda (France) Lilian Marmousez
September 20	Monastir, Tunisia; Hard; M15; Singles and Doubles Draws	(Burundi) Guy Orly Iradukunda (Russia) Marat Sharipov; 6–3, 4–6, [10–6]	(New Zealand) Ajeet Rai (Italy) Giorgio Ricca	(Germany) Christoph Negritu (Italy) Omar Brigida	(France) Ugo Blanchet (Italy) Giovanni Oradini (Burundi) Guy Orly Iradukunda (France) Lilian Marmousez
September 20	Vyshkovo, Ukraine; Clay; M15; Singles and Doubles Draws	(Hungary) Gergely Madarász; 7–6^{(7–1)}, 3–6, 6–4	(Russia) Ivan Nedelko	(Italy) Tommaso Compagnucci (Ukraine) Georgii Kravchenko	(Ukraine) Oleg Prihodko (Ukraine) Aleksandr Braynin (Poland) Yann Wójcik (Ukraine) Illya Beloborodko
September 20	Vyshkovo, Ukraine; Clay; M15; Singles and Doubles Draws	(Poland) Szymon Kielan (Poland) Yann Wójcik; 7–6^{(12–10)}, 7–6^{(12–10)}	(Belgium) Romain Faucon (Moldova) Ilya Snițari	(Italy) Tommaso Compagnucci (Ukraine) Georgii Kravchenko	(Ukraine) Oleg Prihodko (Ukraine) Aleksandr Braynin (Poland) Yann Wójcik (Ukraine) Illya Beloborodko
September 20	Fayetteville, United States; Hard; M15; Singles and Doubles Draws	(China) Shang Juncheng; 6–3, 6–0	(United Kingdom) Mark Whitehouse	(Romania) Gabi Adrian Boitan (United Kingdom) Henry Patten	(Spain) Pedro Vives Marcos (United States) Toby Kodat (Switzerland) Jeffrey von der Schulenburg (United Kingdom) Paul Jubb
September 20	Fayetteville, United States; Hard; M15; Singles and Doubles Draws	(France) Alexandre Reco (France) Nicolas Rousset; 6–3, 3–6, [10–6]	(Ghana) Abraham Asaba (United States) Sekou Bangoura	(Romania) Gabi Adrian Boitan (United Kingdom) Henry Patten	(Spain) Pedro Vives Marcos (United States) Toby Kodat (Switzerland) Jeffrey von der Schulenburg (United Kingdom) Paul Jubb
September 27	Budapest, Hungary; Clay; M25; Singles and Doubles Draws	(Hungary) Máté Valkusz; 6–3, 6–4	(Poland) Paweł Ciaś	(Hungary) Zsombor Piros (Hungary) Fábián Marozsán	(Czech Republic) Filip Duda (Belgium) Buvaysar Gadamauri (Czech Republic) Martin Krumich (Italy) Federico Iannaccone
September 27	Budapest, Hungary; Clay; M25; Singles and Doubles Draws	(Hungary) Gábor Borsos (Hungary) Péter Nagy; 6–7^{(4–7)}, 6–3, [13–11]	(Czech Republic) Filip Duda (Czech Republic) Jaroslav Pospíšil	(Hungary) Zsombor Piros (Hungary) Fábián Marozsán	(Czech Republic) Filip Duda (Belgium) Buvaysar Gadamauri (Czech Republic) Martin Krumich (Italy) Federico Iannaccone
September 27	Skopje, North Macedonia; Clay; M25; Singles and Doubles Draws	(Italy) Matteo Arnaldi; 6–1, 6–0	(Germany) Louis Wessels	(Bosnia and Herzegovina) Aldin Šetkić (Germany) Henri Squire	(Russia) Andrey Chepelev (France) Clément Tabur (Italy) Riccardo Balzerani (Moldova) Alexander Cozbinov
September 27	Skopje, North Macedonia; Clay; M25; Singles and Doubles Draws	(Croatia) Domagoj Bilješko (France) Clément Tabur; 6–1, 6–3	(Italy) Stefano Battaglino (Ukraine) Eric Vanshelboim	(Bosnia and Herzegovina) Aldin Šetkić (Germany) Henri Squire	(Russia) Andrey Chepelev (France) Clément Tabur (Italy) Riccardo Balzerani (Moldova) Alexander Cozbinov
September 27	Pretoria, South Africa; Hard; M25; Singles and Doubles Draws	(Japan) Rio Noguchi; 6–3, 7–5	(Canada) Filip Peliwo	(South Africa) Khololwam Montsi (Greece) Michail Pervolarakis	(Germany) Sebastian Prechtel (United Kingdom) Alastair Gray (Australia) Jeremy Beale (Netherlands) Ryan Nijboer
September 27	Pretoria, South Africa; Hard; M25; Singles and Doubles Draws	(Australia) Jeremy Beale (Zimbabwe) Benjamin Lock; 4–6, 6–4, [10–7]	(Netherlands) Ryan Nijboer (Austria) Neil Oberleitner	(South Africa) Khololwam Montsi (Greece) Michail Pervolarakis	(Germany) Sebastian Prechtel (United Kingdom) Alastair Gray (Australia) Jeremy Beale (Netherlands) Ryan Nijboer
September 27	Falun, Sweden; Hard (indoor); M25; Singles and Doubles Draws	(Japan) Shintaro Imai; 2–6, 7–6^{(7–2)}, 6–2	(France) Valentin Royer	(United States) Vasil Kirkov (Uzbekistan) Khumoyun Sultanov	(France) Antoine Escoffier (Japan) Yuta Shimizu (United Kingdom) Daniel Little (Austria) Maximilian Neuchrist
September 27	Falun, Sweden; Hard (indoor); M25; Singles and Doubles Draws	(Japan) Yuta Shimizu (Uzbekistan) Khumoyun Sultanov; 6–3, 3–6, [11–9]	(Australia) Blake Ellis (Japan) Renta Tokuda	(United States) Vasil Kirkov (Uzbekistan) Khumoyun Sultanov	(France) Antoine Escoffier (Japan) Yuta Shimizu (United Kingdom) Daniel Little (Austria) Maximilian Neuchrist
September 27	Cairo, Egypt; Clay; M15; Singles and Doubles Draws	(Lebanon) Hady Habib; 6–3, 6–4	(Italy) Lorenzo Rottoli	(Italy) Luciano Darderi (Argentina) Fermín Tenti	(Ukraine) Volodymyr Uzhylovskyi (Italy) Simone Roncalli (Brazil) Gabriel Ciro da Silva (Italy) Edoardo Lavagno
September 27	Cairo, Egypt; Clay; M15; Singles and Doubles Draws	(Argentina) Leonardo Aboian (Italy) Luciano Darderi; 6–1, 6–1	(United States) Jordan Chiu (Thailand) Maximus Jones	(Italy) Luciano Darderi (Argentina) Fermín Tenti	(Ukraine) Volodymyr Uzhylovskyi (Italy) Simone Roncalli (Brazil) Gabriel Ciro da Silva (Italy) Edoardo Lavagno
September 27	Forbach, France; Carpet (indoor); M15; Singles and Doubles Draws	(France) Dan Added; 6–4, 7–6^{(7–2)}	(United Kingdom) Luke Johnson	(Belgium) Arnaud Bovy (Syria) Hazem Naw	(United Kingdom) Millen Hurrion (France) Boris Fassbender (France) Arthur Bouquier (France) Arthur Reymond
September 27	Forbach, France; Carpet (indoor); M15; Singles and Doubles Draws	(United Kingdom) Luke Johnson (United Kingdom) Ben Jones; 6–3, 6–2	(France) Maxence Beaugé (France) Arthur Bouquier	(Belgium) Arnaud Bovy (Syria) Hazem Naw	(United Kingdom) Millen Hurrion (France) Boris Fassbender (France) Arthur Bouquier (France) Arthur Reymond
September 27	Cancún, Mexico; Hard; M15; Singles and Doubles Draws	(United States) Christian Langmo; 6–3, 6–3	(Colombia) Juan Sebastián Gómez	(United States) Strong Kirchheimer (Argentina) Federico Agustín Gómez	(United States) Victor Lilov (United States) Alfredo Perez (United States) Dusty Boyer (United States) Emil Reinberg
September 27	Cancún, Mexico; Hard; M15; Singles and Doubles Draws	(Thailand) Wishaya Trongcharoenchaikul (Japan) Seita Watanabe; 6–4, 6–1	(United States) Austin Ansari (India) Siddhant Banthia	(United States) Strong Kirchheimer (Argentina) Federico Agustín Gómez	(United States) Victor Lilov (United States) Alfredo Perez (United States) Dusty Boyer (United States) Emil Reinberg
September 27	Monastir, Tunisia; Hard; M15; Singles and Doubles Draws	(France) Ugo Blanchet; 4–6, 7–6^{(7–5)}, 6–2	(France) Quentin Folliot	(Netherlands) Guy den Ouden (United States) Gage Brymer	(Tunisia) Skander Mansouri (Japan) Ryota Tanuma (Japan) Kosuke Ogura (Germany) Christoph Negritu
September 27	Monastir, Tunisia; Hard; M15; Singles and Doubles Draws	(Japan) Kazuki Nishiwaki (Japan) Kosuke Ogura; 1–6, 6–4, [10–6]	(Poland) Wojciech Marek (Austria) Lukas Neumayer	(Netherlands) Guy den Ouden (United States) Gage Brymer	(Tunisia) Skander Mansouri (Japan) Ryota Tanuma (Japan) Kosuke Ogura (Germany) Christoph Negritu
September 27	Lubbock, United States; Hard; M15; Singles and Doubles Draws	(United States) Keegan Smith; 7–5, 6–2	(United States) Cannon Kingsley	(United Kingdom) Henry Patten (Slovenia) Sven Lah	(Netherlands) Gijs Brouwer (United States) Omni Kumar (United Kingdom) Mark Whitehouse (United Kingdom) Charles Broom
September 27	Lubbock, United States; Hard; M15; Singles and Doubles Draws	(United States) Sekou Bangoura (Netherlands) Gijs Brouwer; 6–4, 4–6, [10–5]	(Germany) Constantin Frantzen (Slovenia) Sven Lah	(United Kingdom) Henry Patten (Slovenia) Sven Lah	(Netherlands) Gijs Brouwer (United States) Omni Kumar (United Kingdom) Mark Whitehouse (United Kingdom) Charles Broom
