= 2026 Ankara Challenger – Singles =

Singles
- 2026 Ankara Challenger

Events
Singles	Doubles
- Ankara Challenger

This is the first edition of the tournament.

== Seeds ==
1. (Germany) Diego Dedura
2. (Spain) Daniel Rincón
3. (France) Thomas Faurel
4. (Turkey) Yankı Erel
5. (Slovakia) Andrej Martin
6. (Czech Republic) Matthew William Donald
7. (Germany) Max Wiskandt
8. Svyatoslav Gulin

== Draw ==
Key

- Q = Qualifier
- WC = Wild card
- LL = Lucky loser
- Alt = Alternate
- ITF = ITF entry
- PR = Protected ranking
- SR = Special ranking
- SE = Special exempt
- JE = Junior exempt
- JR = Junior Accelerator Programme entrant
- CO = College Accelerator Programme entrant
- NG = Next Gen Accelerator Program entrant
- w/o = Walkover
- r = Retired
- d = Defaulted

=== Finals ===
Semifinals

Final

=== Top half ===
First round
1	(Germany) D Dedura
Q
(Bulgaria) Y Milev
(North Macedonia) O Prihodko
(Japan) Kenta Miyoshi
Q
(Turkey) E Kırkın
5	(Slovakia) A Martin
3	(France) T Faurel
(Portugal) J Domingues
Q
Q
Q
(Serbia) Dušan Obradović
(Netherlands) J Sels
7	(Germany) M Wiskandt

Second round
Q

Quarterfinals

Semifinals

=== Bottom half ===
First round
8	Svyatoslav Gulin
(Portugal) Gonçalo Marques
(Ukraine) Vadym Ursu
Q
WC	(Turkey) Gökberk Sarıtaş
WC	(Turkey) MN Türker
(Turkey) T Duran
4	(Turkey) Y Erel
6	(Czech Republic) Matthew William Donald
WC	(Turkey) C İlkel
(Romania) A Boitan
(France) Robin Catry
(Italy) A Binda
(France) M Bobichon
(Italy) Leonardo Rossi
2	(Spain) D Rincón

Second round
WC	(Turkey)
(Turkey)

Quarterfinals
(Turkey)

Semifinals
