= 2026 Levante Open – Doubles =

Doubles
- 2026 Levante Open

Final
- Champions: (Ukraine) Oleksandr Ovcharenko (Germany) Kai Wehnelt
- Runners-up: (Mexico) Luis Carlos Álvarez (Germany) Adrian Oetzbach
- Score: 6–1, 6–3

Events
Singles	Doubles
- Levante Open

This was the first edition of the tournament.

Oleksandr Ovcharenko and Kai Wehnelt won the title after defeating Luis Carlos Álvarez and Adrian Oetzbach 6–1, 6–3 in the final.

== Seeds ==
1. (Venezuela) Juan José Bianchi / (Australia) Kody Pearson (quarterfinals)
2. (Republic of Ireland) Charles Barry / (United States) Garrett Johns (first round)
3. (Ukraine) Oleksandr Ovcharenko / (Germany) Kai Wehnelt (champions)
4. (France) Geoffrey Blancaneaux / (United Kingdom) Jay Clarke (first round)

== Draw ==
Key

- Q = Qualifier
- WC = Wild card
- LL = Lucky loser
- Alt = Alternate
- ITF = ITF entry
- PR = Protected ranking
- SR = Special ranking
- SE = Special exempt
- JE = Junior exempt
- JR = Junior Accelerator Programme entrant
- CO = College Accelerator Programme entrant
- NG = Next Gen Accelerator Program entrant
- w/o = Walkover
- r = Retired
- d = Defaulted

First round
1	(Venezuela) Juan José Bianchi (Australia) K Pearson	w/o
(Czech Republic) M Krumich (Slovakia) A Martin
(Sweden) Oliver Johansson (India) Atharva Sharma	4	4
(Italy) Fabrizio Andaloro (Ukraine) V Uzhylovskyi	6	6
4	(France) G Blancaneaux (United Kingdom) J Clarke	6^{5}	7^{7}	[3]
(Mexico) LC Álvarez (Germany) Adrian Oetzbach	7^{7}	6^{2}	[10]
WC	(Italy) Riccardo Perin (Italy) Matteo Sciahbasi	3	5
(Belgium) B Gadamauri (Greece) D Sakellaridis	6	7
(Italy) F Agamenone (Italy) G Ricca	7^{7}	6
WC	(Italy) Lorenzo Angelini (Italy) Filippo Francesco Garbero	6^{4}	2
(Italy) Simone Agostini (Spain) Ignasi Forcano	6^{1}	1
3	(Ukraine) O Ovcharenko (Germany) K Wehnelt	7^{7}	6
(Lebanon) B Hassan (Tunisia) S Mansouri	6	6
(Spain) Carles Córdoba (Venezuela) Ignacio Parisca	3	4
(Italy) G Cadenasso (Italy) Massimo Giunta	6	6
2	(Republic of Ireland) C Barry (United States) G Johns	3	2

Quarterfinals
1	(Venezuela) JJ Bianchi (Australia) K Pearson	7	5	[11]
(Italy) F Andaloro (Ukraine) V Uzhylovskyi	5	7	[13]
(Mexico) LC Álvarez (Germany) A Oetzbach	5	6	[10]
(Belgium) B Gadamauri (Greece) D Sakellaridis	7	4	[2]
(Italy) F Agamenone (Italy) G Ricca	4	5
3	(Ukraine) O Ovcharenko (Germany) K Wehnelt	6	7
(Lebanon) B Hassan (Tunisia) S Mansouri	6^{7}	5
(Italy) G Cadenasso (Italy) M Giunta	7^{9}	7

Semifinals
(Italy) F Andaloro (Ukraine) V Uzhylovskyi	3	2
(Mexico) LC Álvarez (Germany) A Oetzbach	6	6
3	(Ukraine) O Ovcharenko (Germany) K Wehnelt	w/o
(Italy) G Cadenasso (Italy) M Giunta

Final
(Mexico) LC Álvarez (Germany) A Oetzbach	1	3
3	(Ukraine) O Ovcharenko (Germany) K Wehnelt	6	6
