= Levante Open =

- 2026 Levante Open

ATP Challenger Tour
- Location: Bari, Italy
- Category: ATP Challenger Tour
- Surface: Clay

The Levante Open is a professional tennis tournament played on clay courts. It is currently part of the ATP Challenger Tour. It was first held in Bari, Italy in 2026.

== Past finals ==
=== Singles ===
Year	Champion	Runner-up	Score
2026	(Italy) Samuele Pieri	(Italy) Juan Cruz Martin Manzano	6–4, 6–1

=== Doubles ===
Year	Champions	Runners-up	Score
2026	(Ukraine) Oleksandr Ovcharenko (Germany) Kai Wehnelt	(Mexico) Luis Carlos Álvarez (Germany) Adrian Oetzbach	6–1, 6–3
