= 2026 Levante Open – Singles =

Singles
- 2026 Levante Open

Final
- Champion: (Italy) Samuele Pieri
- Runner-up: (Italy) Juan Cruz Martin Manzano
- Score: 6–4, 6–1

Events
Singles	Doubles
- Levante Open

This was the first edition of the tournament.

Samuele Pieri won the title after defeating Juan Cruz Martin Manzano 6–4, 6–1 in the final.

== Seeds ==
1. (Hungary) Zsombor Piros (second round)
2. (Denmark) Elmer Møller (first round)
3. (Ukraine) Vitaliy Sachko (semifinals)
4. (Italy) Lorenzo Giustino (second round, retired)
5. (Spain) Pol Martín Tiffon (first round)
6. (Italy) Gianluca Cadenasso (quarterfinals, retired)
7. (United Kingdom) Jay Clarke (second round)
8. (Czech Republic) Martin Krumich (quarterfinals)

== Draw ==
Key

- Q = Qualifier
- WC = Wild card
- LL = Lucky loser
- Alt = Alternate
- ITF = ITF entry
- PR = Protected ranking
- SR = Special ranking
- SE = Special exempt
- JE = Junior exempt
- JR = Junior Accelerator Programme entrant
- CO = College Accelerator Programme entrant
- NG = Next Gen Accelerator Program entrant
- w/o = Walkover
- r = Retired
- d = Defaulted

=== Finals ===
Semifinals
Alt	(Italy) Juan Cruz Martin Manzano	6	6
Q	(Czech Republic) Matthew William Donald	3	2
3	(Ukraine) Vitaliy Sachko	7	4	2
(Italy) Samuele Pieri	5	6	6

Final
Alt	(Italy) Juan Cruz Martin Manzano	4	1
(Italy) Samuele Pieri	6	6

=== Top half ===
First round
1/WC	(Hungary) Z Piros	7^{7}	6
(Lebanon) B Hassan	6^{1}	3
(Belgium) B Gadamauri	6	3	2
(Italy) E Dalla Valle	2	6	6
WC	(Italy) Matteo Sciahbasi	5	3
Alt	(Italy) Juan Cruz Martin Manzano	7	6
Q	(Italy) Fabrizio Andaloro	2	1
7	(United Kingdom) J Clarke	6	6
4	(Italy) L Giustino	7	6^{6}	6
Q	(Germany) John Sperle	5	7^{8}	4
(Sweden) O Wallin	3	5
Q	(Czech Republic) Matthew William Donald	6	7
(Germany) M Wiskandt	7^{8}	6^{2}	3
Q	(Italy) Pierluigi Basile	6^{6}	7^{7}	6
Q	(Spain) Imanol López Morillo	1	2^{r}
8	(Czech Republic) M Krumich	6	4

Second round
1/WC	(Hungary) Z Piros	4	2
(Italy) E Dalla Valle	6	6
Alt	(Italy) JC Martin Manzano	6	6
7	(United Kingdom) J Clarke	4	4
4	(Italy) L Giustino	7^{7}	3	1^{r}
Q	(Czech Republic) MW Donald	6^{1}	6	3
Q	(Italy) P Basile	3	1
8	(Czech Republic) M Krumich	6	6

Quarterfinals
(Italy) E Dalla Valle	1	2
Alt	(Italy) JC Martin Manzano	6	6
Q	(Czech Republic) MW Donald	4	6	6
8	(Czech Republic) M Krumich	6	1	3

Semifinals
Alt	(Italy) JC Martin Manzano	6	6
Q	(Czech Republic) MW Donald	3	2

=== Bottom half ===
First round
6	(Italy) G Cadenasso	6	6
CO	(Germany) B Sanchez Martinez	3	1
WC	(Italy) Lorenzo Angelini	4	7^{7}	7
(United States) G Johns	6	6^{4}	5
(France) G Blancaneaux	3	0
(Bulgaria) D Kuzmanov	6	6
NG	(Germany) Mika Petkovic	2	1
3	(Ukraine) V Sachko	6	6
5	(Spain) P Martín Tiffon	7^{7}	3	5
(France) L Lokoli	6^{5}	6	7
(Italy) S Pieri	6	6
(Slovakia) A Martin	4	4
Alt	(Italy) Massimo Giunta	6	6
Q	(Italy) F Arnaboldi	3	1
(Spain) C Taberner	6	6
2	(Denmark) E Møller	3	4

Second round
6	(Italy) G Cadenasso	5	6	6
WC	(Italy) L Angelini	7	3	0
(Bulgaria) D Kuzmanov	3	1
3	(Ukraine) V Sachko	6	6
(France) L Lokoli	6^{2}	6^{2}
(Italy) S Pieri	7^{7}	7^{7}
Alt	(Italy) M Giunta	2	2
(Spain) C Taberner	6	6

Quarterfinals
6	(Italy) G Cadenasso	6	2	0^{r}
3	(Ukraine) V Sachko	4	6	3
(Italy) S Pieri	6	4	6
(Spain) C Taberner	4	6	3

Semifinals
3	(Ukraine) V Sachko	7	4	2
(Italy) S Pieri	5	6	6
