= 2026 Internazionali di Sicilia – Singles =

Singles
- 2026 Internazionali di Sicilia

Final
- Champion: (Italy) Francesco Passaro
- Runner-up: (Czech Republic) Jonáš Forejtek
- Score: 6–3, 6–7^{(2–7)}, 7–6^{(7–4)}

Events
Singles	Doubles
- Internazionali di Sicilia

Filippo Volandri was the defending champion from when the tournament was last held but had since retired from professional tennis. This was the first edition of the tournament as a Challenger event, and the first edition held since 2006.

Francesco Passaro won the title after defeating Jonáš Forejtek 6–3, 6–7^{(2–7)}, 7–6^{(7–4)} in the final.

== Seeds ==
1. (Czech Republic) Zdeněk Kolář (second round)
2. (Italy) Lorenzo Giustino (second round)
3. (Italy) Gianluca Cadenasso (second round)
4. (Italy) Francesco Passaro (champion)
5. (Spain) Alejandro Moro Cañas (semifinals)
6. (United Kingdom) Jay Clarke (first round)
7. (Czech Republic) Martin Krumich (second round)
8. (Belgium) Buvaysar Gadamauri (second round)

== Draw ==
Key

- Q = Qualifier
- WC = Wild card
- LL = Lucky loser
- Alt = Alternate
- ITF = ITF entry
- PR = Protected ranking
- SR = Special ranking
- SE = Special exempt
- JE = Junior exempt
- JR = Junior Accelerator Programme entrant
- CO = College Accelerator Programme entrant
- NG = Next Gen Accelerator Program entrant
- w/o = Walkover
- r = Retired
- d = Defaulted

=== Finals ===
Semifinals
Alt	(Czech Republic) Jonáš Forejtek	6^{1}	6	7^{7}
5	(Spain) Alejandro Moro Cañas	7^{7}	4	6^{4}
4	(Italy) Francesco Passaro	6	6
Q	(Bulgaria) Yanaki Milev	2	1

Final
Alt	(Czech Republic) Jonáš Forejtek	3	7^{7}	6^{4}
4	(Italy) Francesco Passaro	6	6^{2}	7^{7}

=== Top half ===
First round
1	(Czech Republic) Z Kolář	6	6
Q	(Greece) D Sakellaridis	4	4
(Italy) M Ribecai	5	7	6
CO	(Germany) B Sanchez Martinez	7	5	0
Alt	(Czech Republic) J Forejtek	7	6
(Austria) S Kopp	5	4
(Italy) S Pieri	0	4
7	(Czech Republic) M Krumich	6	6
3	(Italy) G Cadenasso	3	6	6
Q	(Italy) F Moroni	6	4	3
WC	(Italy) Pierluigi Basile	6	4	1
(Italy) Massimo Giunta	4	6	6
Alt	(Germany) L Wessels	3	6	2^{r}
(Slovakia) A Martin	6	2	4
Q	(North Macedonia) K Ivanovski	2	3
5	(Spain) A Moro Cañas	6	6

Second round
1	(Czech Republic) Z Kolář	1	1
(Italy) M Ribecai	6	6
Alt	(Czech Republic) J Forejtek	6	6
7	(Czech Republic) M Krumich	3	4
3	(Italy) G Cadenasso	6^{9}	5
(Italy) M Giunta	7^{11}	7
(Slovakia) A Martin	0	3
5	(Spain) A Moro Cañas	6	6

Quarterfinals
(Italy) M Ribecai	1	6	6^{5}
Alt	(Czech Republic) J Forejtek	6	1	7^{7}
(Italy) M Giunta	4	7^{7}	6^{10}
5	(Spain) A Moro Cañas	6	6^{2}	7^{12}

Semifinals
Alt	(Czech Republic) J Forejtek	6^{1}	6	7^{7}
5	(Spain) A Moro Cañas	7^{7}	4	6^{4}

=== Bottom half ===
First round
6	(United Kingdom) J Clarke	3	1
(Italy) G Piraino	6	6
WC	(Italy) Luca Potenza	1	5
(Italy) E Dalla Valle	6	7
WC	(Italy) CA Caniato	6	6
(Germany) M Wiskandt	2	3
(Spain) O Roca Batalla	1	6^{4}
4	(Italy) F Passaro	6	7^{7}
8	(Belgium) B Gadamauri	7	7
Q	(Spain) P Vives Marcos	5	5
Alt	I Gakhov	2	3
Q	(Bulgaria) Y Milev	6	6
(Spain) C Sánchez Jover	6	3	6
(Italy) F Forti	4	6	4
Q	(United States) Christian Langmo	4	1
2	(Italy) L Giustino	6	6

Second round
(Italy) G Piraino	4	3
(Italy) E Dalla Valle	6	6
WC	(Italy) CA Caniato	6	3	4
4	(Italy) F Passaro	4	6	6
8	(Belgium) B Gadamauri	2	6^{5}
Q	(Bulgaria) Y Milev	6	7^{7}
(Spain) C Sánchez Jover	2	6	6
2	(Italy) L Giustino	6	2	3

Quarterfinals
(Italy) E Dalla Valle	3	4
4	(Italy) F Passaro	6	6
Q	(Bulgaria) Y Milev	7	6
(Spain) C Sánchez Jover	5	3

Semifinals
4	(Italy) F Passaro	6	6
Q	(Bulgaria) Y Milev	2	1
