= 2026 Internazionali di Sicilia =

- Date: 5 – 11 October
- Edition: 53rd
- Surface: Clay
- Location: Palermo, Italy

Champions

Singles
- (Italy) Francesco Passaro

Doubles
- (Ukraine) Oleksandr Ovcharenko / (Germany) Kai Wehnelt
- Internazionali di Sicilia

The 2026 Internazionali di Sicilia was a professional tennis tournament played on clay courts. It was the 53rd edition of the tournament which was part of the 2026 ATP Challenger Tour. It took place in Palermo, Italy between 5 and 11 October 2026.

== Singles main-draw entrants ==
=== Seeds ===
| Country | Player | Rank^{1} | Seed |
|---|---|---|---|
| CZE | Zdeněk Kolář | 189 | 1 |
| ITA | Lorenzo Giustino | 210 | 2 |
| ITA | Gianluca Cadenasso | 222 | 3 |
| ITA | Francesco Passaro | 225 | 4 |
| ESP | Alejandro Moro Cañas | 230 | 5 |
| GBR | Jay Clarke | 236 | 6 |
| CZE | Martin Krumich | 254 | 7 |
| BEL | Buvaysar Gadamauri | 265 | 8 |

- ^{1} Rankings are as of 28 September 2026.

=== Other entrants ===
The following players received wildcards into the singles main draw:

- (Italy) Pierluigi Basile
- (Italy) Carlo Alberto Caniato
- (Italy) Luca Potenza

The following player received entry into the singles main draw through the College Accelerator programme:

- (Germany) Benito Sanchez Martinez

The following players received entry into the singles main draw as alternates:

- (Czech Republic) Jonáš Forejtek
- Ivan Gakhov
- (Germany) Louis Wessels

The following players received entry from the qualifying draw:

- (North Macedonia) Kalin Ivanovski
- (United States) Christian Langmo
- (Bulgaria) Yanaki Milev
- (Italy) Filippo Moroni
- (Greece) Dimitris Sakellaridis
- (Spain) Pedro Vives Marcos

== Champions ==
=== Singles ===
- (Italy) Francesco Passaro def. (Czech Republic) Jonáš Forejtek 6–3, 6–7^{(2–7)}, 7–6^{(7–4)}.

=== Doubles ===
- (Ukraine) Oleksandr Ovcharenko / (Germany) Kai Wehnelt def. (Czech Republic) Jonáš Forejtek / (Germany) Max Wiskandt 7–5, 6–2.
