= 2026 Internazionali di Sicilia – Doubles =

Doubles
- 2026 Internazionali di Sicilia

Final
- Champions: (Ukraine) Oleksandr Ovcharenko (Germany) Kai Wehnelt
- Runners-up: (Czech Republic) Jonáš Forejtek (Germany) Max Wiskandt
- Score: 7–5, 6–2

Events
| Singles | Doubles |
- Internazionali di Sicilia

Martín García and Luis Horna were the defending champions from when the tournament was last held but had since retired from professional tennis. This was the first edition of the tournament as a Challenger event, and the first edition held since 2006.

Oleksandr Ovcharenko and Kai Wehnelt won the title after deafeting Jonáš Forejtek and Max Wiskandt 7–5, 6–2 in the final.

== Seeds ==
1. (Czech Republic) Dominik Reček / (Czech Republic) Daniel Siniakov (first round)
2. (Venezuela) Juan José Bianchi / (Australia) Kody Pearson (quarterfinals)
3. (Ukraine) Oleksandr Ovcharenko / (Germany) Kai Wehnelt (champions)
4. (India) Jeevan Nedunchezhiyan / (United States) Billy Suarez (quarterfinals)

== Draw ==
Key

- Q = Qualifier
- WC = Wild card
- LL = Lucky loser
- Alt = Alternate
- ITF = ITF entry
- PR = Protected ranking
- SR = Special ranking
- SE = Special exempt
- JE = Junior exempt
- JR = Junior Accelerator Programme entrant
- CO = College Accelerator Programme entrant
- NG = Next Gen Accelerator Program entrant
- w/o = Walkover
- r = Retired
- d = Defaulted

First round
1 | (Czech Republic) D Reček (Czech Republic) D Siniakov | 6^{6} | 4
(Italy) Jacopo Bilardo (Italy) G Ricca | 7^{8} | 6
(Italy) M Ribecai (Italy) Gabriele Volpi | 2 | 4
(Italy) CA Caniato (Italy) F Forti | 6 | 6
4 | (India) J Nedunchezhiyan (United States) B Suarez | w/o
Alt | (Czech Republic) M Krumich (Slovakia) A Martin
WC | (Italy) Riccardo Perin (Italy) Luca Potenza | 2 | 3
(Czech Republic) J Forejtek (Germany) M Wiskandt | 6 | 6
(Sweden) Oliver Johansson (Cyprus) E Neos | 6^{6} | 3
(Republic of Ireland) C Barry (Spain) P Vives Marcos | 7^{8} | 6
(Spain) O Roca Batalla (Spain) C Sánchez Jover | 7^{7} | 2 | [4]
3 | (Ukraine) O Ovcharenko (Germany) K Wehnelt | 6^{2} | 6 | [10]
(India) Atharva Sharma (Ukraine) V Uzhylovskyi | 4 | 4
(Belgium) B Gadamauri (Greece) D Sakellaridis | 6 | 6
WC | (Italy) Sebastiano Cocola (Italy) Daniele Rapagnetta | 5 | 0
2 | (Venezuela) Juan José Bianchi (Australia) K Pearson | 7 | 6

Quarterfinals
(Italy) J Bilardo (Italy) G Ricca | w/o
(Italy) CA Caniato (Italy) F Forti
4 | (India) J Nedunchezhiyan (United States) B Suarez | 4 | 6^{7}
(Czech Republic) J Forejtek (Germany) M Wiskandt | 6 | 7^{9}
(Republic of Ireland) C Barry (Spain) P Vives Marcos | 4 | 6 | [7]
3 | (Ukraine) O Ovcharenko (Germany) K Wehnelt | 6 | 3 | [10]
(Belgium) B Gadamauri (Greece) D Sakellaridis | 7^{7} | 4 | [10]
2 | (Venezuela) JJ Bianchi (Australia) K Pearson | 6^{5} | 6 | [3]

Semifinals
(Italy) J Bilardo (Italy) G Ricca | 3 | 5
(Czech Republic) J Forejtek (Germany) M Wiskandt | 6 | 7
3 | (Ukraine) O Ovcharenko (Germany) K Wehnelt | 6 | 6
(Belgium) B Gadamauri (Greece) D Sakellaridis | 2 | 0

Final
(Czech Republic) J Forejtek (Germany) M Wiskandt | 5 | 2
3 | (Ukraine) O Ovcharenko (Germany) K Wehnelt | 7 | 6
