= Oleksandr Ovcharenko =

Ukrainian tennis player (born 2001)

- Country (sports): Ukraine
- Born: 17 October 2001 (age 25) Kyiv, Ukraine
- Height: 1.85 m (6 ft 1 in)
- Plays: Right-handed (two-handed backhand)
- Coach: Davide Spina
- Prize money: US $135,649

Singles
- Career record: 1–2 (at ATP Tour level, Grand Slam level, and in Davis Cup)
- Career titles: 3 ITF
- Highest ranking: No. 296 (10 February 2025)
- Current ranking: No. 616 (19 October 2026)

Doubles
- Career record: 1–1 (at ATP Tour level, Grand Slam level, and in Davis Cup)
- Career titles: 1 ATP Challenger, 4 ITF
- Highest ranking: No. 198 (19 October 2026)
- Current ranking: No. 198 (19 October 2026)
- Last updated on: 19 October 2026.

Oleksandr Ovcharenko (born 17 October 2001) is a Ukrainian tennis player. He has a career high ATP singles ranking of world No. 296 achieved on 10 February 2025 and a career high ATP doubles ranking of No. 198 achieved on 19 October 2026.

Teaming up with Kai Wehnelt, Ovcharenko won his first ATP Challenger doubles title at the 2026 Levante Open, defeating Luis Carlos Álvarez and Adrian Oetzbach in the final.

Ovcharenko represents Ukraine at the Davis Cup, where he has a W/L record of 0–1.

== ATP Challenger and ITF Tour finals ==
=== Singles 11 (5–6) ===
Legend ATP Challenger (0–0) ITF Futures (5–6)	Finals by surface Hard (0–1) Clay (5–5)

Result	W–L	Date	Tournament	Tier	Surface	Opponent	Score
Loss	0–1	May 2022	M15 Prijedor, Bosnia and Herzegovina	World Tennis Tour	Clay	(Japan) Rimpei Kawakami	2–6, 2–6
Win	1–1	Jul 2022	M15 Bergamo, Italy	World Tennis Tour	Clay	(Italy) Gianmarco Ferrari	6–4, 6–4
Win	2–1	Jul 2022	M15 Litija, Slovenia	World Tennis Tour	Clay	(Argentina) Juan Pablo Paz	6–1, 6–7^{(6–8)}, 6–3
Win	3–1	Jul 2022	M25 Radomlje, Slovenia	World Tennis Tour	Clay	(Argentina) Matías Zukas	6–4, 6–3
Loss	3–2	Nov 2022	M25 Heraklion, Greece	World Tennis Tour	Hard	(Czech Republic) Jakub Menšík	4–6, 6–7^{(4–7)}
Win	4–2	Mar 2024	M15 Opatija, Croatia	World Tennis Tour	Clay	(Italy) Federico Arnaboldi	6–1, 6–0
Loss	4–3	Apr 2024	M25 Hammamet, Tunisia	World Tennis Tour	Clay	(France) Manuel Guinard	0–6, 3–6
Loss	4–4	Jul 2024	M25 Padova, Italy	World Tennis Tour	Clay	(Italy) Gianluca Mager	6–4, 2–6, 4–6
Loss	4–5	Aug 2024	M25 Maribor, Slovenia	World Tennis Tour	Clay	(Croatia) Mili Poljicak	5–7, 6–7^{(6–8)}
Loss	4–6	Sep 2024	M25 Santa Margherita di Pula, Italy	World Tennis Tour	Clay	(Spain) Carlos Sánchez Jover	5–7, 2–6
Win	5–6	Oct 2024	M25 Santa Margherita di Pula, Italy	World Tennis Tour	Clay	(Italy) Gianluca Cadenasso	7–5, 6–2

=== Doubles 36 (18–18) ===
Legend ATP Challenger (3–2) ITF Futures (15–16)	Finals by surface Hard (0–3) Clay (18–15)

Result	W–L	Date	Tournament	Tier	Surface	Partner	Opponents	Score
Loss	0–1	Feb 2021	M15 Antalya, Turkey	World Tennis Tour	Clay	(South Korea) Chung Yun-seong	(Netherlands) Max Houkes (Netherlands) Sidané Pontjodikromo	5–7, 1–6
Loss	0–2	Apr 2021	M15 Antalya, Turkey	World Tennis Tour	Clay	(Italy) Emiliano Maggioli	(Hungary) Péter Fajta (Hungary) Fábián Marozsán	5–7, 6–7^{(3–7)}
Loss	0–3	May 2021	M15 Antalya, Turkey	World Tennis Tour	Clay	(Italy) Emiliano Maggioli	(Switzerland) Sandro Ehrat (Switzerland) Louroi Martinez	6–3, 4–6, [11–13]
Loss	0–4	Jul 2021	M15 Doboj, Bosnia and Herzegovina	World Tennis Tour	Clay	(United Kingdom) Felix Gill	(Slovakia) Krištof Minárik (Slovakia) Lukáš Pokorný	6–7^{(5–7)}, 4–6
Win	1–4	Sep 2021	M15 Pirot, Serbia	World Tennis Tour	Clay	(Spain) David Jordà Sanchis	(Italy) Liugi Sorrentino (Italy) Lorenzo Vatteroni	6–1, 6–4
Loss	1–5	Nov 2021	M15 Sharm El-Sheikh, Egypt	World Tennis Tour	Hard	(Italy) Emiliano Maggioli	(Belgium) Loïc Cloes (Czech Republic) Ondřej Horák	6–2, 4–6, [5–10]
Win	2–5	Jan 2022	M15 Antalya, Turkey	World Tennis Tour	Clay	(Sweden) Dragoș Nicolae Mădăraș	(Spain) Carlos López Montagud (Spain) Benjamín Winter López	6–3, 6–3
Loss	2–6	Jan 2022	M15 Antalya, Turkey	World Tennis Tour	Clay	(Sweden) Dragoș Nicolae Mădăraș	(South Korea) Hong Seong-chan (South Korea) Nam Ji-sung	3–6, 3–6
Win	3–6	Aug 2022	M15 Novi Sad, Serbia	World Tennis Tour	Clay	(Croatia) Frane Ninčević	(Serbia) Viktor Jović (Russia) Marat Sharipov	7–5, 3–6, [11–9]
Win	4–6	Sep 2022	M25 Santa Margherita di Pula, Italy	World Tennis Tour	Clay	(Italy) Andrea Picchione	(Italy) Fausto Tabacco (Italy) Giorgio Tabacco	6–1, 3–6, [10–7]
Loss	4–7	Oct 2022	M25 Santa Margherita di Pula, Italy	World Tennis Tour	Clay	(Italy) Andrea Picchione	(Latvia) Miķelis Lībietis (Germany) Timo Stodder	Walkover
Loss	4–8	Feb 2023	M25 Monastir, Tunisia	World Tennis Tour	Hard	(Austria) Neil Oberleitner	(Belarus) Erik Arutiunian (Belarus) Daniil Ostapenkov	1–6, 7–6^{(7–3)}, [6–10]
Win	5–8	Mar 2023	M15 Opatija, Croatia	World Tennis Tour	Clay	(Ukraine) Viacheslav Bielinskyi	(Croatia) Luka Mikrut (Serbia) Stefan Popovic	6–2, 6–4
Win	6–8	May 2023	M15 Kursumlijska Banja , Serbia	World Tennis Tour	Clay	(Argentina) Juan Pablo Paz	(Montenegro) Rrezart Cungu (Lebanon) Hady Habib	7–6^{(7–5)}, 6–4
Win	7–8	May 2023	M25 Kursumlijska Banja , Serbia	World Tennis Tour	Clay	(North Macedonia) Kalin Ivanovski	(Russia) Andrey Chepelev (Belarus) Mikalai Haliak	3–6, 7–6^{(7–5)}, [10–5]
Loss	7–9	Feb 2024	M25 Hammamet, Tunisia	World Tennis Tour	Clay	(Italy) Omar Brigida	(Italy) Simone Agostini (Italy) Gianluca Cadenasso	2–6, 6–1, [7–10]
Win	8–9	Jul 2024	M25 Bolzano, Italy	World Tennis Tour	Clay	(France) Lilian Marmousez	(Argentina) Luciano Emanuel Ambrogi (Italy) Davide Cortimiglia	6–2, 6–1
Loss	8–10	Aug 2024	M25 Maribor, Slovenia	World Tennis Tour	Clay	(Italy) Matteo Fondriest	(Czech Republic) Filip Duda (Czech Republic) David Poljak	3–6, 4–6
Win	9–10	Apr 2025	M25 Santa Margherita di Pula, Italy	World Tennis Tour	Clay	(Spain) Carlos Sánchez Jover	(India) Chirag Duhan (Argentina) Lautaro Agustín Falabella	6–4, 3–6, [10–3]
Win	10–10	May 2025	M25 Santa Margherita di Pula, Italy	World Tennis Tour	Clay	(Argentina) Lautaro Agustín Falabella	(Argentina) Guido Andreozzi; Daniil Golubev	6–0, 7–6^{(7–4)}
Win	11–10	May 2025	M15 Bucharest, Romania	World Tennis Tour	Clay	(Argentina) Juan Pablo Paz	(Argentina) Valentín Basel (Argentina) Lautaro Agustín Falabella	Walkover
Loss	11–11	Jul 2025	M25+H Kassel, Germany	World Tennis Tour	Clay	(Bulgaria) Petr Nesterov	(France) Max Westphal (United States) Theodore Winegar	6–7^{(2–7)}, 3–6
Win	12–11	Jul 2025	M25 Kramsach, Austria	World Tennis Tour	Clay	(Ukraine) Vladyslav Orlov	(Germany) Henri Squire (Switzerland) Jeffrey von der Schulenburg	4–6, 7–6^{(8–6)}, [10–5]
Loss	12–12	Jul 2025	M25+H Bacău, Romania	World Tennis Tour	Clay	(Argentina) Juan Pablo Paz	(Uruguay) Franco Roncadelli (Moldova) Ilya Snițari	7–5, 4–6, [5–10]
Win	13–12	Aug 2025	M25 Lesa, Italy	World Tennis Tour	Clay	(Italy) Gianluca Cadenasso	(Italy) Francesco Forti (Italy) Giovanni Oradini	6–7^{(6–8)}, 6–3, [10–5]
Loss	13–13	Oct 2025	M25 Santa Margherita di Pula, Italy	World Tennis Tour	Clay	(Netherlands) Michiel de Krom	(Italy) Federico Bondioli (Italy) Giovanni Oradini	3–6, 4–6
Loss	13–14	Nov 2025	M15 Antalya, Turkey	World Tennis Tour	Clay	(Sweden) Dragoș Nicolae Mădăraș	(Serbia) Marko Maksimović (Serbia) Stefan Popović	6–2, 6–7^{(4–7)}, [8–10]
Loss	13–15	Nov 2025	M25 Antalya, Turkey	World Tennis Tour	Clay	(Republic of Ireland) Charles Barry	(Serbia) Marko Maksimović (Serbia) Stefan Popović	6–2, 5–7, [7–10]
Loss	13–16	Mar 2026	Hersonissos, Greece	Challenger	Hard	(Bulgaria) Petr Nesterov	(Belgium) Michael Geerts (Portugal) Tiago Pereira	6–3, 4–6, [5–10]
Win	14–16	Jul 2026	M15 Bucharest, Romania	World Tennis Tour	Clay	(Italy) Riccardo Perin	(Romania) Ștefan Adrian Andreescu (Romania) Gheorghe Claudiu Schinteie	6–4, 4–6, [10–5]
Win	15–16	Jul 2026	M25+H Bacău, Romania	World Tennis Tour	Clay	(Italy) Riccardo Perin	(United States) Kabeer Kapasi (United States) Petro Kuzmenok	6–3, 2–6, [10–5]
Loss	15–17	Jul 2026	M25 Pitești, Romania	World Tennis Tour	Clay	(Italy) Riccardo Perin	(Romania) Ștefan Horia Haita (Romania) Radu David Țurcanu	6–2, 2–6, [5–10]
Loss	15–18	Sep 2026	Plovdiv, Bulgaria	Challenger	Clay	(Bulgaria) Anthony Genov	(Argentina) Valerio Aboian (Argentina) Juan Manuel La Serna	6–4, 5–7, [8–10]
Win	16–18	Sep 2026	Bari, Italy	Challenger	Clay	(Germany) Kai Wehnelt	(Mexico) Luis Carlos Álvarez (Germany) Adrian Oetzbach	6–1, 6–3
Win	17–18	Oct 2026	Palermo, Italy	Challenger	Clay	(Germany) Kai Wehnelt	(Czech Republic) Jonáš Forejtek (Germany) Max Wiskandt	7–5, 6–2
Win	18–18	Oct 2026	San Gregorio, Italy	Challenger	Clay	(Germany) Kai Wehnelt	(Spain) Ignasi Forcano (Morocco) Younes Lalami	6–4, 6–2
