= 2026 Ankara Challenger =

- Date: 23–29 November
- Edition: 1st
- Surface: Hard (indoor)
- Location: Ankara, Turkey
- Ankara Challenger

The 2026 Ankara Challenger was a professional tennis tournament played on hard courts. It was the first edition of the tournament which was part of the 2026 ATP Challenger Tour. It took place in Ankara, Turkey between 23 and 29 November 2026.

== Singles main-draw entrants ==
=== Seeds ===
Country	Player	Rank^{1}	Seed
GER	Diego Dedura	185	1
ESP	Daniel Rincón	234	2
FRA	Thomas Faurel	295	3
TUR	Yankı Erel	298	4
SVK	Andrej Martin	349	5
CZE	Matthew William Donald	352	6
GER	Max Wiskandt	400	7
	Svyatoslav Gulin	407	8

- ^{1} Rankings are as of 16 November 2026.

=== Other entrants ===
The following players received wildcards into the singles main draw:

- (Turkey) Cem İlkel
- (Turkey) Gökberk Sarıtaş
- (Turkey) Mert Naci Türker

The following players received entry from the qualifying draw:

== Champions ==
=== Singles ===
- vs.

=== Doubles ===
- / vs. /
