= Ankara Challenger =

- 2026 Ankara Challenger

ATP Challenger Tour
- Location: Ankara, Turkey
- Category: ATP Challenger Tour
- Surface: Hard (indoor)

The Ankara Challenger is a professional tennis tournament played on indoor hardcourts. It is currently part of the ATP Challenger Tour. It was first held in Ankara, Turkey in 2026.

== Past finals ==
=== Singles ===
| Year | Champion | Runner-up | Score |
|---|---|---|---|
| 2026 | | | |

=== Doubles ===
| Year | Champions | Runners-up | Score |
|---|---|---|---|
| 2026 | | | |
