= Kai Wehnelt =

German tennis player (born 1995)

- Country (sports): Germany
- Born: 27 November 1995 (age 30) Berlin, Germany
- Height: 1.88 m (6 ft 2 in)
- Plays: Right-handed (two-handed backhand)
- College: Hawaii; Utah State
- Coach: Oana Gavrilă
- Prize money: US $185,795

Singles
- Career record: 0–0 (at ATP Tour level, Grand Slam level, and in Davis Cup)
- Career titles: 2 ITF
- Highest ranking: No. 513 (9 September 2019)
- Current ranking: No. 640 (16 November 2026)

Doubles
- Career record: 0–0 (at ATP Tour level, Grand Slam level, and in Davis Cup)
- Career titles: 3 ATP Challenger, 50 ITF
- Highest ranking: No. 147 (6 November 2023)
- Current ranking: No. 155 (16 November 2026)
- Last updated on: 17 November 2026.

Kai Wehnelt (born 27 November 1995) is a German tennis player. He has a career high ATP singles ranking of No. 513 achieved on 9 September 2019 and a best doubles ranking of No. 147 achieved on 6 November 2023.

Teaming up with Oleksandr Ovcharenko, Wehnelt won his first ATP Challenger doubles title at the 2026 Levante Open, defeating Luis Carlos Álvarez and Adrian Oetzbach in the final.

Wehnelt played college tennis at Hawaiʻi before transferring to Utah State.

== ATP Challenger finals ==
=== Doubles: 9 (3 titles, 6 runner-ups) ===
Finals by surface
Hard (0–1)
Clay (3–5)

Result	W–L	Date	Tournament	Surface	Partner	Opponents	Score
Loss	0–1	Nov 2022	Calgary Challenger, Canada	Hard (i)	(Italy) Julian Ocleppo	(Austria) Maximilian Neuchrist (Greece) Michail Pervolarakis	4–6, 4–6
Loss	0–2	Aug 2023	Platzmann Open, Germany	Clay	(Germany) Jakob Schnaitter	(Switzerland) Luca Margaroli (Argentina) Santiago Rodríguez Taverna	6–7^{(4–7)}, 4–6
Loss	0–3	Sep 2023	NÖ Open, Austria	Clay	(Poland) Piotr Matuszewski	(Czech Republic) Zdeněk Kolář (Slovenia) Blaž Rola	4–6, 6–4, [6–10]
Loss	0–4	Sep 2023	Sibiu Open, Romania	Clay	(Poland) Piotr Matuszewski	(Czech Republic) Andrew Paulson (Czech Republic) Michael Vrbenský	2–6, 2–6
Loss	0–5	May 2026	Shymkent Challenger, Kazakhstan	Clay	(Norway) Viktor Durasovic	(Croatia) Admir Kalender (Croatia) Mili Poljičak	2–6, 7–6^{(9–7)}, [5–10]
Loss	0–6	Jul 2026	Internationaux de Troyes, France	Clay	(Bulgaria) Anthony Genov	(Netherlands) Mats Hermans (Brazil) Igor Marcondes	3–6, 6–3, [7–10]
Win	1–6	Oct 2026	Levante Open, Italy	Clay	(Ukraine) Oleksandr Ovcharenko	(Mexico) Luis Carlos Álvarez (Germany) Adrian Oetzbach	6–1, 6–3
Win	2–6	Oct 2026	Internazionali di Sicilia, Italy	Clay	(Ukraine) Oleksandr Ovcharenko	(Czech Republic) Jonáš Forejtek (Germany) Max Wiskandt	7–5, 6–2
Win	3–6	Oct 2026	Trofeo di San Gregorio, Italy	Clay	(Ukraine) Oleksandr Ovcharenko	(Spain) Ignasi Forcano (Morocco) Younes Lalami	6–4, 6–2
