= Samuele Pieri =

Italian tennis player (born 2002)

- Country (sports): Italy
- Born: 28 February 2002 (age 24) Borgo San Lorenzo, Italy
- Height: 1.83 m (6 ft 0 in)
- Plays: Right-handed (two-handed backhand)
- Coach: Jacopo Stefanini
- Prize money: US $82,608

Singles
- Career record: 0–0 (at ATP Tour level, Grand Slam level, and in Davis Cup)
- Career titles: 1 ATP Challenger , 3 ITF
- Highest ranking: No. 306 (16 November 2026)
- Current ranking: No. 306 (16 November 2026)

Doubles
- Career record: 0–0 (at ATP Tour level, Grand Slam level, and in Davis Cup)
- Career titles: 3 ITF
- Highest ranking: No. 770 (21 October 2024)
- Current ranking: No. 1,238 (16 November 2026)
- Last updated on: 16 November 2026.

Samuele Pieri (born 28 February 2002) is an Italian tennis player. He has a career high ATP singles ranking of No. 306 achieved on 16 November 2026 and a career high ATP doubles ranking of No. 770 achieved on 21 October 2024.

Pieri has won one ATP Challenger singles title at the 2026 Levante Open.
