= Luis Carlos Álvarez =

Mexican tennis player (born 2004)

- Country (sports): Mexico
- Born: 3 September 2004 (age 22) Mexico City, Mexico
- Height: 1.75 m (5 ft 9 in)
- Plays: Right-handed (two-handed backhand)
- College: Oklahoma
- Coach: Diego Marañon
- Prize money: US $69,605

Singles
- Career record: 2–2 (at ATP Tour level, Grand Slam level, and in Davis Cup)
- Career titles: 0
- Highest ranking: No. 533 (29 September 2025)
- Current ranking: No. 643 (16 November 2026)

Doubles
- Career record: 1–2 (at ATP Tour level, Grand Slam level, and in Davis Cup)
- Career titles: 0
- Highest ranking: No. 324 (16 November 2026)
- Current ranking: No. 324 (16 November 2026)
- Last updated on: 16 November 2026.

Luis Carlos Álvarez Valdés (born 3 September 2004) is a Mexican tennis player. He has a career high ATP singles ranking of world No. 533 achieved on 29 September 2025 and a career high ATP doubles ranking of No. 324 achieved on 16 November 2026.

Álvarez plays college tennis at Oklahoma.

He also represents Mexico at the Davis Cup, where he has a win-loss record of 1–0.

== Career ==
Álvarez made his ATP main draw debut after receiving a wildcard for the singles qualifying draw and for the doubles main draw of the 2023 Los Cabos Open. He won his first qualification singles match defeating Brazil's Eduardo Ribeiro but lost the second match in three close sets 7–5, 5–7, 6–4.

Álvarez made his singles debut in the main draw of the 2025 Los Cabos Open. This marked the first time in the nine editions of the tournament in Los Cabos there were four Mexicans in the singles main draw. He defeated James McCabe in the first round to record his first ATP win outside of the Davis Cup.
