= 2026 Plovdiv Challenger III – Singles =

Singles
- 2026 Plovdiv Challenger III

Final
- Champion: (Ukraine) Georgii Kravchenko
- Runner-up: (Bulgaria) Yanaki Milev
- Score: 6–0, 6–2

Events
Singles	Doubles
- Plovdiv Challenger

Gabriele Piraino was the defending champion but lost in the first round to Dušan Obradović.

Georgii Kravchenko won the title after defeating Yanaki Milev 6–0, 6–2 in the final.

== Seeds ==
1. (Spain) Pol Martín Tiffon (second round)
2. (Czech Republic) Maxim Mrva (second round)
3. (Argentina) Juan Manuel La Serna (quarterfinals)
4. (Italy) Franco Agamenone (first round)
5. (Bulgaria) Petr Nesterov (first round)
6. (France) Calvin Hemery (second round, retired)
7. (Germany) Marko Topo (first round, retired)
8. (Serbia) Ognjen Milić (second round)

== Draw ==
Key

- Q = Qualifier
- WC = Wild card
- LL = Lucky loser
- Alt = Alternate
- ITF = ITF entry
- PR = Protected ranking
- SR = Special ranking
- SE = Special exempt
- JE = Junior exempt
- JR = Junior Accelerator Programme entrant
- CO = College Accelerator Programme entrant
- NG = Next Gen Accelerator Program entrant
- w/o = Walkover
- r = Retired
- d = Defaulted

=== Finals ===
Semifinals
(Ukraine) Georgii Kravchenko	2	6	6
(Serbia) Dušan Obradović	6	2	3
WC	(Bulgaria) Yanaki Milev	6	5	6
(Argentina) Valerio Aboian	4	7	2

Final
(Ukraine) Georgii Kravchenko	6	6
WC	(Bulgaria) Yanaki Milev	0	2

=== Top half ===
First round
1	(Spain) P Martín Tiffon	6	6
(Argentina) JP Ficovich	4	4
Q	(Ukraine) O Ovcharenko	6	7^{7}
(Latvia) R Strombachs	2	6^{5}
(Czech Republic) D Siniakov	6^{2}	6	6^{10}
(Ukraine) G Kravchenko	7^{7}	3	7^{12}
WC	(Bulgaria) George Lazarov	5	7	2
8	(Serbia) O Milić	7	5	6
4	(Italy) F Agamenone	5	3
(Italy) Massimo Giunta	7	6
(Italy) G Piraino	3	6	5
(Serbia) Dušan Obradović	6	2	7
(France) T Faurel	7	7
Q	(Italy) Giorgio Tabacco	5	5
(Ukraine) Eric Vanshelboim	6	0	2
6	(France) C Hemery	3	6	6

Second round
1	(Spain) P Martín Tiffon	7^{7}	4	1
Q	(Ukraine) O Ovcharenko	6^{5}	6	6
(Ukraine) G Kravchenko	6	7^{7}
8	(Serbia) O Milić	0	6^{3}
(Italy) M Giunta	6	1	6^{4}
(Serbia) D Obradović	3	6	7^{7}
(France) T Faurel	7	5	4
6	(France) C Hemery	5	7	2^{r}

Quarterfinals
Q	(Ukraine) O Ovcharenko	3	3
(Ukraine) G Kravchenko	6	6
(Serbia) D Obradović	6	7^{7}
(France) T Faurel	4	6^{4}

Semifinals
(Ukraine) G Kravchenko	2	6	6
(Serbia) D Obradović	6	2	3

=== Bottom half ===
First round
5	(Bulgaria) P Nesterov	6^{6}	6	4
WC	(Bulgaria) Y Milev	7^{8}	3	6
Alt	(Slovenia) Filip Jeff Planinšek	2	4
Q	(Venezuela) Ignacio Parisca	6	6
Q	(Ukraine) N Mashtakov	7	7^{7}
Q	(Serbia) Stefan Popović	5	6^{3}
WC	(Bulgaria) A Vasilev	1	2
3	(Argentina) JM La Serna	6	6
7	(Germany) M Topo	1	0^{r}
(Argentina) V Aboian	6	3
(Czech Republic) Petr Brunclík	6^{3}	1
(Austria) Sebastian Sorger	7^{7}	6
Q	(Italy) Federico Iannaccone	4	6	6
(Argentina) Juan Estévez	6	3	1
(North Macedonia) O Prihodko	5	7^{7}	1
2	(Czech Republic) M Mrva	7	6^{5}	6

Second round
WC	(Bulgaria) Y Milev	7	6
Q	(Venezuela) I Parisca	5	0
Q	(Ukraine) N Mashtakov	2	4
3	(Argentina) JM La Serna	6	6
(Argentina) V Aboian	6^{7}	6	6
(Austria) S Sorger	7^{9}	0	2
Q	(Italy) F Iannaccone	6	6
2	(Czech Republic) M Mrva	4	4

Quarterfinals
WC	(Bulgaria) Y Milev	6	3	6
3	(Argentina) JM La Serna	3	6	1
(Argentina) V Aboian	6	6
Q	(Italy) F Iannaccone	4	1

Semifinals
WC	(Bulgaria) Y Milev	6	5	6
(Argentina) V Aboian	4	7	2
