= 2026 Plovdiv Challenger II – Doubles =

Doubles
- 2026 Plovdiv Challenger II

Final
- Champions: (Brazil) João Victor Couto Loureiro (Brazil) Eduardo Ribeiro
- Runners-up: (Serbia) Tadija Radovanović (France) Cosme Rolland de Ravel
- Score: 6–4, 6–2

Events
Singles	Doubles
- Plovdiv Challenger

Jarno Jans and Niels Visker were the defending champions but chose not to defend their title.

João Victor Couto Loureiro and Eduardo Ribeiro won the title after defeating Tadija Radovanović and Cosme Rolland de Ravel 6–4, 6–2 in the final.

== Seeds ==
1. (Republic of Ireland) Charles Barry / (Bulgaria) Anthony Genov (semifinals)
2. (Argentina) Valentín Basel / (Argentina) Franco Ribero (first round)
3. (Brazil) João Victor Couto Loureiro / (Brazil) Eduardo Ribeiro (champions)
4. (Argentina) Hernán Casanova / (Bolivia) Murkel Dellien (quarterfinals, withdrew)

== Draw ==
Key

- Q = Qualifier
- WC = Wild card
- LL = Lucky loser
- Alt = Alternate
- ITF = ITF entry
- PR = Protected ranking
- SR = Special ranking
- SE = Special exempt
- JE = Junior exempt
- JR = Junior Accelerator Programme entrant
- CO = College Accelerator Programme entrant
- NG = Next Gen Accelerator Program entrant
- w/o = Walkover
- r = Retired
- d = Defaulted

First round
1	(Republic of Ireland) C Barry (Bulgaria) A Genov	7^{7}	7^{7}
(Bulgaria) Y Milev (Bulgaria) P Nesterov	6^{3}	6^{5}
(India) Madhwin Kamath (India) Atharva Sharma	6	4	[12]
WC	(Bulgaria) Georgi Georgiev (Bulgaria) Yoan Naydenov	3	6	[10]
3	(Brazil) JVC Loureiro (Brazil) E Ribeiro	6^{11}	6	[10]
(Argentina) V Aboian (Italy) Simone Agostini	7^{13}	1	[6]
(Zimbabwe) CJ Lock (United States) Michael Zhu	3	3
(United States) C Papa (China) B Zheng	6	6
(Serbia) Tadija Radovanović (France) Cosme Rolland de Ravel	7	6
(Italy) Lorenzo Angelini (Italy) CA Caniato	5	4
WC	(Bulgaria) R Shandarov (Bulgaria) V Shandarov	4	2
4	(Argentina) H Casanova (Bolivia) M Dellien	6	6
(South Korea) G Campaña Lee (South Africa) Vasilios Caripi	2	6	[10]
(Japan) Yamato Sueoka (Japan) N Tajima	6	3	[6]
(Italy) Lorenzo Carboni (Ukraine) V Uzhylovskyi	6^{3}	6	[10]
2	(Argentina) Valentín Basel (Argentina) F Ribero	7^{7}	4	[8]

Quarterfinals
1	(Republic of Ireland) C Barry (Bulgaria) A Genov	4	7	[11]
(India) M Kamath (India) A Sharma	6	5	[9]
3	(Brazil) JVC Loureiro (Brazil) E Ribeiro	6	3	[10]
(United States) C Papa (China) B Zheng	4	6	[3]
(Serbia) T Radovanović (France) C Rolland de Ravel	w/o
4	(Argentina) H Casanova (Bolivia) M Dellien
(South Korea) G Campaña Lee (South Africa) V Caripi
(Italy) L Carboni (Ukraine) V Uzhylovskyi	w/o

Semifinals
1	(Republic of Ireland) C Barry (Bulgaria) A Genov	6	1	[8]
3	(Brazil) JVC Loureiro (Brazil) E Ribeiro	3	6	[10]
(Serbia) T Radovanović (France) C Rolland de Ravel	6	6
(Italy) L Carboni (Ukraine) V Uzhylovskyi	2	1

Final
3	(Brazil) JVC Loureiro (Brazil) E Ribeiro	6	6
(Serbia) T Radovanović (France) C Rolland de Ravel	4	2
