= 2026 Plovdiv Challenger III – Doubles =

Doubles
- 2026 Plovdiv Challenger III

Final
- Champions: (Argentina) Valerio Aboian (Argentina) Juan Manuel La Serna
- Runners-up: (Bulgaria) Anthony Genov (Ukraine) Oleksandr Ovcharenko
- Score: 4–6, 7–5, [10–8]

Events
Singles	Doubles
- Plovdiv Challenger

João Victor Couto Loureiro and Eduardo Ribeiro were the defending champions but chose not to defend their title.

Valerio Aboian and Juan Manuel La Serna won the title after defeating Anthony Genov and Oleksandr Ovcharenko 4–6, 7–5, [10–8] in the final.

== Seeds ==
1. (Argentina) Valentín Basel / (Argentina) Franco Ribero (quarterfinals)
2. (Germany) Jannik Opitz / (Latvia) Robert Strombachs (quarterfinals)
3. (Bulgaria) Anthony Genov / (Ukraine) Oleksandr Ovcharenko (final)
4. (Bulgaria) Yanaki Milev / (Serbia) Stefan Popović (semifinals)

== Draw ==
Key

- Q = Qualifier
- WC = Wild card
- LL = Lucky loser
- Alt = Alternate
- ITF = ITF entry
- PR = Protected ranking
- SR = Special ranking
- SE = Special exempt
- JE = Junior exempt
- JR = Junior Accelerator Programme entrant
- CO = College Accelerator Programme entrant
- NG = Next Gen Accelerator Program entrant
- w/o = Walkover
- r = Retired
- d = Defaulted

First round
(Czech Republic) D Siniakov (Ukraine) Eric Vanshelboim	7^{7}	6
(Argentina) Juan Estévez (Argentina) Máximo Zeitune	6^{3}	3
(Bulgaria) R Shandarov (Bulgaria) V Shandarov	4	1
(Italy) Federico Iannaccone (Ukraine) G Kravchenko	6	6
(Ukraine) N Mashtakov (Serbia) Tadija Radovanović	6	7^{10}
WC	(Bulgaria) Borislav Kirilov (Bulgaria) George Lazarov	4	6^{8}
WC	(Bulgaria) Kaloyan Shikov (Bulgaria) Daniel Spasov	2	2
4	(Bulgaria) Y Milev (Serbia) Stefan Popović	6	6
Vardan Manukyan (Serbia) Dušan Obradović	4	3
(Argentina) V Aboian (Argentina) JM La Serna	6	6

Quarterfinals
1	(Argentina) Valentín Basel (Argentina) F Ribero	6^{4}	1
(Czech Republic) D Siniakov (Ukraine) E Vanshelboim	7^{7}	6
3	(Bulgaria) A Genov (Ukraine) O Ovcharenko	5	6	[10]
(Italy) F Iannaccone (Ukraine) G Kravchenko	7	3	[3]
(Ukraine) N Mashtakov (Serbia) T Radovanović	4	4
4	(Bulgaria) Y Milev (Serbia) S Popović	6	6
(Argentina) V Aboian (Argentina) JM La Serna	5	6	[10]
2	(Germany) J Opitz (Latvia) R Strombachs	7	4	[2]

Semifinals
(Czech Republic) D Siniakov (Ukraine) E Vanshelboim	4	2
3	(Bulgaria) A Genov (Ukraine) O Ovcharenko	6	6
4	(Bulgaria) Y Milev (Serbia) S Popović	6	6^{6}	[5]
(Argentina) V Aboian (Argentina) JM La Serna	4	7^{8}	[10]

Final
3	(Bulgaria) A Genov (Ukraine) O Ovcharenko	6	5	[8]
(Argentina) V Aboian (Argentina) JM La Serna	4	7	[10]
