= 2026 Plovdiv Challenger – Singles =

Singles
- 2026 Plovdiv Challenger

Final
- Champion: (Spain) Iñaki Montes de la Torre
- Runner-up: (Austria) Sandro Kopp
- Score: 7–6^{(7–5)}, 3–6, 7–6^{(10–8)}

Events
Singles	Doubles
- Plovdiv Challenger

This was the first edition of the tournament.

Iñaki Montes de la Torre won the title after defeating Sandro Kopp 7–6^{(7–5)}, 3–6, 7–6^{(10–8)} in the final.

== Seeds ==
1. (South Africa) Philip Henning (first round)
2. (Czech Republic) Maxim Mrva (first round)
3. (United States) Dali Blanch (quarterfinals)
4. (Poland) Daniel Michalski (quarterfinals)
5. (Spain) Iñaki Montes de la Torre (champion)
6. (France) Matteo Martineau (second round)
7. (Austria) Sandro Kopp (final)
8. (Serbia) Ognjen Milić (quarterfinals)

== Draw ==
Key

- Q = Qualifier
- WC = Wild card
- LL = Lucky loser
- Alt = Alternate
- ITF = ITF entry
- PR = Protected ranking
- SR = Special ranking
- SE = Special exempt
- JE = Junior exempt
- JR = Junior Accelerator Programme entrant
- CO = College Accelerator Programme entrant
- NG = Next Gen Accelerator Program entrant
- w/o = Walkover
- r = Retired
- d = Defaulted

=== Finals ===
Semifinals
JR	(Spain) Andrés Santamarta Roig	4	2
5	(Spain) Iñaki Montes de la Torre	6	6
7	(Austria) Sandro Kopp	6	3	6
(Bulgaria) Petr Nesterov	2	6	4

Final
5	(Spain) Iñaki Montes de la Torre	7^{7}	3	7^{10}
7	(Austria) Sandro Kopp	6^{5}	6	6^{8}

=== Top half ===
First round
1	(South Africa) P Henning	4	1
JR	(Spain) A Santamarta Roig	6	6
(Italy) E Dalla Valle	6	6
Q	(Uzbekistan) Nikita Belozertsev	0	2
(Finland) E Vasa	4	7	6
(India) M Dhamne	6	5	4
WC	(Bulgaria) Y Milev	2	6	4
8	(Serbia) O Milić	6	3	6
4	(Poland) D Michalski	6	6
PR	(Netherlands) G Brouwer	2	0
(Bulgaria) D Kuzmanov	3	4
(Netherlands) J Sels	6	6
Q	(Australia) T Fancutt	6	3	0
(France) Mathys Erhard	3	6	6
Q	(Spain) Imanol López Morillo	4	1
5	(Spain) I Montes de la Torre	6	6

Second round
JR	(Spain) A Santamarta Roig	6	6
(Italy) E Dalla Valle	2	4
(Finland) E Vasa	6	1	4
8	(Serbia) O Milić	2	6	6
4	(Poland) D Michalski	6	1
(Netherlands) J Sels	0	0^{r}
(France) M Erhard	6	4	2
5	(Spain) I Montes de la Torre	3	6	6

Quarterfinals
JR	(Spain) A Santamarta Roig	6	6
8	(Serbia) O Milić	0	2
4	(Poland) D Michalski	5	2
5	(Spain) I Montes de la Torre	7	6

Semifinals
JR	(Spain) A Santamarta Roig	4	2
5	(Spain) I Montes de la Torre	6	6

=== Bottom half ===
First round
7	(Austria) S Kopp	6	5	6
(Norway) V Durasovic	2	7	3
WC	(Bulgaria) A Vasilev	7	6
Alt	(Netherlands) N Visker	5	1
(Italy) G Piraino	6	4	1
Q	(Italy) Lorenzo Angelini	2	6	6
Q	(Bulgaria) Dinko Dinev	4	2
3	(United States) Dali Blanch	6	6
6	(France) M Martineau	6	6
WC	(Bulgaria) I Radulov	3	2
(Brazil) D Dutra da Silva	2	2
(Bulgaria) P Nesterov	6	6
(France) G Blancaneaux	2	1
Q	(Poland) T Berkieta	6	6
(Italy) Tommaso Compagnucci	7^{7}	6^{3}	6
2	(Czech Republic) M Mrva	6^{5}	7^{7}	2

Second round
7	(Austria) S Kopp	6	7
WC	(Bulgaria) A Vasilev	1	5
Q	(Italy) L Angelini	2	3
3	(United States) Dal Blanch	6	6
6	(France) M Martineau	3	3
(Bulgaria) P Nesterov	6	6
Q	(Poland) T Berkieta	3	3
(Italy) T Compagnucci	6	6

Quarterfinals
7	(Austria) S Kopp	6	6
3	(United States) Dal Blanch	3	3
(Bulgaria) P Nesterov	6	7^{7}
(Italy) T Compagnucci	3	6^{4}

Semifinals
7	(Austria) S Kopp	6	3	6
(Bulgaria) P Nesterov	2	6	4
