= 2026 Plovdiv Challenger II – Singles =

Singles
- 2026 Plovdiv Challenger II

Final
- Champion: (Italy) Gabriele Piraino
- Runner-up: (Bulgaria) Petr Nesterov
- Score: 6–1, 7–6^{(7–5)}

Events
Singles	Doubles
- Plovdiv Challenger

Iñaki Montes de la Torre was the defending champion but chose not to defend his title.

Gabriele Piraino won the title after defeating Petr Nesterov 6–1, 7–6^{(7–5)} in the final.

== Seeds ==
1. (Brazil) Pedro Boscardin Dias (first round)
2. (Italy) Franco Agamenone (second round)
3. (Austria) Sandro Kopp (first round)
4. (Colombia) Daniel Elahi Galán (second round, retired)
5. (Bolivia) Murkel Dellien (first round)
6. (Argentina) Hernán Casanova (first round)
7. (Serbia) Ognjen Milić (second round)
8. (Spain) Oriol Roca Batalla (first round)

== Draw ==
Key

- Q = Qualifier
- WC = Wild card
- LL = Lucky loser
- Alt = Alternate
- ITF = ITF entry
- PR = Protected ranking
- SR = Special ranking
- SE = Special exempt
- JE = Junior exempt
- JR = Junior Accelerator Programme entrant
- CO = College Accelerator Programme entrant
- NG = Next Gen Accelerator Program entrant
- w/o = Walkover
- r = Retired
- d = Defaulted

=== Finals ===
Semifinals
(Italy) Gabriele Piraino	7	6
(Spain) Carlos Sánchez Jover	5	2
(Bulgaria) Petr Nesterov	7	6
(Romania) Radu Mihai Papoe	5	3

Final
(Italy) Gabriele Piraino	6	7^{7}
(Bulgaria) Petr Nesterov	1	6^{5}

=== Top half ===
First round
1	(Brazil) P Boscardin Dias	3	6	4
(Italy) S Pieri	6	0	6
Q	(South Korea) G Campaña Lee	6	6
Q	(Italy) Pietro Marino	0	2
(Italy) G Piraino	6	3	6
(Italy) CA Caniato	4	6	3
WC	(Bulgaria) I Ivanov	0	0
7	(Serbia) O Milić	6	6
4	(Colombia) DE Galán	6	6^{5}	6
Q	(Bulgaria) Georgi Georgiev	3	7^{7}	2
(Argentina) V Aboian	2	6	2
(Spain) C Sánchez Jover	6	2	6
(Brazil) E Ribeiro	5	2
Q	(Bulgaria) George Lazarov	7	6
WC	(Bulgaria) Y Milev	6	6
8	(Spain) O Roca Batalla	4	4

Second round
(Italy) S Pieri	7	5	1
Q	(South Korea) G Campaña Lee	5	7	6
(Italy) G Piraino	6	6
7	(Serbia) O Milić	4	3
4	(Colombia) DE Galán	2	0^{r}
(Spain) C Sánchez Jover	6	0
Q	(Bulgaria) G Lazarov	6	6
WC	(Bulgaria) Y Milev	3	1

Quarterfinals
Q	(South Korea) G Campaña Lee	1	1
(Italy) G Piraino	6	6
(Spain) C Sánchez Jover	6	6
Q	(Bulgaria) G Lazarov	2	3

Semifinals
(Italy) G Piraino	7	6
(Spain) C Sánchez Jover	5	2

=== Bottom half ===
First round
5	(Bolivia) M Dellien	1	6^{10}
Q	(Bulgaria) A Andreev	6	7^{12}
Alt	(Belgium) Émilien Demanet	6	6
WC	(Bulgaria) A Vasilev	3	4
Alt	(Italy) Lorenzo Angelini	5	1
(Bulgaria) P Nesterov	7	6
(Austria) Sebastian Sorger	6	6
3	(Austria) S Kopp	1	1
6	(Argentina) H Casanova	6^{2}	3
JR	(France) YT Alexandrescou	7^{7}	6
(Czech Republic) Petr Brunclík	6	6
(Italy) Lorenzo Carboni	4	4
Q	(Argentina) F Ribero	4	6	3
(Romania) Radu Mihai Papoe	6	1	6
(Belgium) Jack Logé	6^{0}	7	4
2	(Italy) F Agamenone	7^{7}	5	6

Second round
Q	(Bulgaria) A Andreev	w/o
Alt	(Belgium) É Demanet
(Bulgaria) P Nesterov	6	7^{7}
(Austria) S Sorger	4	6^{5}
JR	(France) YT Alexandrescou	7	6
(Czech Republic) P Brunclík	5	3
(Romania) RM Papoe	4	6	7^{7}
2	(Italy) F Agamenone	6	2	6^{2}

Quarterfinals
Q	(Bulgaria) A Andreev	4	1
(Bulgaria) P Nesterov	6	6
JR	(France) YT Alexandrescou	3	3
(Romania) RM Papoe	6	6

Semifinals
(Bulgaria) P Nesterov	7	6
(Romania) RM Papoe	5	3
