= 2026 Plovdiv Challenger – Doubles =

Doubles
- 2026 Plovdiv Challenger

Final
- Champions: (Netherlands) Jarno Jans (Netherlands) Niels Visker
- Runners-up: (Australia) Thomas Fancutt (New Zealand) Ajeet Rai
- Score: 6–4, 7–5

Events
Singles	Doubles
- Plovdiv Challenger

This was the first edition of the tournament.

Jarno Jans and Niels Visker won the title after defeating Thomas Fancutt and Ajeet Rai 6–4, 7–5 in the final.

== Seeds ==
1. (India) Siddhant Banthia / (Bulgaria) Alexander Donski (first round)
2. (Netherlands) Jarno Jans / (Netherlands) Niels Visker (champions)
3. (India) S D Prajwal Dev / (India) Nitin Kumar Sinha (semifinals)
4. (United States) Zachary Fuchs / (United States) Wally Thayne (quarterfinals)

== Draw ==
Key

- Q = Qualifier
- WC = Wild card
- LL = Lucky loser
- Alt = Alternate
- ITF = ITF entry
- PR = Protected ranking
- SR = Special ranking
- SE = Special exempt
- JE = Junior exempt
- JR = Junior Accelerator Programme entrant
- CO = College Accelerator Programme entrant
- NG = Next Gen Accelerator Program entrant
- w/o = Walkover
- r = Retired
- d = Defaulted

First round
1	(India) S Banthia (Bulgaria) A Donski	4	4
WC	(Bulgaria) Alex Ganchev (Bulgaria) A Genov	6	6
WC	(Bulgaria) I Radulov (Bulgaria) A Vasilev	3	5
(Australia) T Fancutt (New Zealand) A Rai	6	7
3	(India) SDP Dev (India) Nitin Kumar Sinha	6	3	[10]
(Japan) Yamato Sueoka (Japan) N Tajima	2	6	[5]
(Belgium) Romain Faucon (Ukraine) V Uzhylovskyi	2	7	[10]
(Chinese Taipei) T-h Huang (China) B Zheng	6	5	[12]
(France) G Blancaneaux (France) M Martineau	6	7
(Italy) Tommaso Compagnucci (India) M Dhamne	3	5
(Italy) Simone Agostini (Sweden) Oliver Johansson	6	1	[10]
4	(United States) Zachary Fuchs (United States) Wally Thayne	4	6	[12]
PR	(Netherlands) G Brouwer (Netherlands) J Sels	1	2
(Norway) V Durasovic (Brazil) D Dutra da Silva	6	6
(Bulgaria) Y Milev (Bulgaria) P Nesterov	3	6	[5]
2	(Netherlands) J Jans (Netherlands) N Visker	6	3	[10]

Quarterfinals
WC	(Bulgaria) A Ganchev (Bulgaria) A Genov	3	6	[6]
(Australia) T Fancutt (New Zealand) A Rai	6	3	[10]
3	(India) SDP Dev (India) NK Sinha	6	6
(Chinese Taipei) T-h Huang (China) B Zheng	3	4
(France) G Blancaneaux (France) M Martineau	7	6
4	(United States) Z Fuchs (United States) W Thayne	5	2
(Norway) V Durasovic (Brazil) D Dutra da Silva	6	6^{1}	[8]
2	(Netherlands) J Jans (Netherlands) N Visker	3	7^{7}	[10]

Semifinals
(Australia) T Fancutt (New Zealand) A Rai	2	6	[10]
3	(India) SDP Dev (India) NK Sinha	6	0	[6]
(France) G Blancaneaux (France) M Martineau	5	6	[9]
2	(Netherlands) J Jans (Netherlands) N Visker	7	3	[11]

Final
(Australia) T Fancutt (New Zealand) A Rai	4	5
2	(Netherlands) J Jans (Netherlands) N Visker	6	7
