= 2026 Plovdiv Challenger III =

- Date: 31 August – 6 September
- Edition: 3rd
- Surface: Clay
- Location: Plovdiv, Bulgaria

Champions

Singles
- (Ukraine) Georgii Kravchenko

Doubles
- (Argentina) Valerio Aboian / (Argentina) Juan Manuel La Serna
- Plovdiv Challenger

The 2026 Plovdiv Challenger III was a professional tennis tournament played on clay courts. It was the third edition of the tournament which was part of the 2026 ATP Challenger Tour. It took place in Plovdiv, Bulgaria between 31 August and 6 September 2026.

== Singles main-draw entrants ==
=== Seeds ===
Country	Player	Rank^{1}	Seed
ESP	Pol Martín Tiffon	210	1
CZE	Maxim Mrva	211	2
ARG	Juan Manuel La Serna	283	3
ITA	Franco Agamenone	285	4
BUL	Petr Nesterov	300	5
FRA	Calvin Hemery	325	6
GER	Marko Topo	339	7
SRB	Ognjen Milić	343	8

- ^{1} Rankings are as of 24 August 2026.

=== Other entrants ===
The following players received wildcards into the singles main draw:

- (Bulgaria) George Lazarov
- (Bulgaria) Yanaki Milev
- (Bulgaria) Alexander Vasilev

The following player received entry into the singles main draw as an alternate:

- (Slovenia) Filip Jeff Planinšek

The following players received entry from the qualifying draw:

- (Italy) Federico Iannaccone
- (Ukraine) Nikita Mashtakov
- (Ukraine) Oleksandr Ovcharenko
- (Venezuela) Ignacio Parisca
- (Serbia) Stefan Popović
- (Italy) Giorgio Tabacco

== Champions ==
=== Singles ===
- (Ukraine) Georgii Kravchenko def. (Bulgaria) Yanaki Milev 6–0, 6–2.

=== Doubles ===
- (Argentina) Valerio Aboian / (Argentina) Juan Manuel La Serna def. (Bulgaria) Anthony Genov / (Ukraine) Oleksandr Ovcharenko 4–6, 7–5, [10–8].
