= Plovdiv Challenger =

- 2026 Plovdiv Challenger

ATP Challenger Tour
- Location: Plovdiv, Bulgaria
- Venue: Tennis Club Lokomotiv
- Category: ATP Challenger Tour
- Surface: Clay

The Plovdiv Challenger is a professional tennis tournament played on clay courts. It is currently part of the ATP Challenger Tour. It was first held in Plovdiv, Bulgaria in 2026 in four editions.

== Past finals ==
=== Singles ===
| Year | Champion | Runner-up | Score |
|---|---|---|---|
| 2026 (4) | (Spain) Max Alcalá Gurri | (Czech Republic) Jonáš Forejtek | 6–4, 6–2 |
| 2026 (3) | (Ukraine) Georgii Kravchenko | (Bulgaria) Yanaki Milev | 6–0, 6–2 |
| 2026 (2) | (Italy) Gabriele Piraino | (Bulgaria) Petr Nesterov | 6–1, 7–6^{(7–5)} |
| 2026 (1) | (Spain) Iñaki Montes de la Torre | (Austria) Sandro Kopp | 7–6^{(7–5)}, 3–6, 7–6^{(10–8)} |

=== Doubles ===
| Year | Champions | Runners-up | Score |
|---|---|---|---|
| 2026 (4) | (Slovakia) Miloš Karol (Czech Republic) Andrew Paulson | (Romania) Bogdan Pavel (Spain) Benjamín Winter López | 6–3, 6–4 |
| 2026 (3) | (Argentina) Valerio Aboian (Argentina) Juan Manuel La Serna | (Bulgaria) Anthony Genov (Ukraine) Oleksandr Ovcharenko | 4–6, 7–5, [10–8] |
| 2026 (2) | (Brazil) João Victor Couto Loureiro (Brazil) Eduardo Ribeiro | (Serbia) Tadija Radovanović (France) Cosme Rolland de Ravel | 6–4, 6–2 |
| 2026 (1) | (Netherlands) Jarno Jans (Netherlands) Niels Visker | (Australia) Thomas Fancutt (New Zealand) Ajeet Rai | 6–4, 7–5 |
