= 2026 Crete Challenger IV – Singles =

Singles
- 2026 Crete Challenger IV

Events
Singles	Doubles
- Crete Challenger

Michele Ribecai was the defending champion but chose not to defend his title.

== Seeds ==
1. (Italy) Gianluca Cadenasso
2. (South Africa) Philip Henning
3. (Spain) Roberto Carballés Baena
4. (Ukraine) Georgii Kravchenko
5. (Romania) Radu Mihai Papoe
6. (Netherlands) Mees Röttgering
7. (Spain) Alejo Sánchez Quílez
8. (Uzbekistan) Sergey Fomin

== Draw ==
Key

- Q = Qualifier
- WC = Wild card
- LL = Lucky loser
- Alt = Alternate
- ITF = ITF entry
- PR = Protected ranking
- SR = Special ranking
- SE = Special exempt
- JE = Junior exempt
- JR = Junior Accelerator Programme entrant
- CO = College Accelerator Programme entrant
- NG = Next Gen Accelerator Program entrant
- w/o = Walkover
- r = Retired
- d = Defaulted

=== Finals ===
Semifinals

Final

=== Top half ===
First round
1	(Italy) G Cadenasso
(Cyprus) M Efstathiou
Q
WC	(Greece) Ioannis Kountourakis
(Italy) Juan Cruz Martin Manzano
(Ukraine) V Orlov
(United States) A Martin
5	(Romania) Radu Mihai Papoe
4	(Ukraine) G Kravchenko
(Italy) J Vasamì
Q
WC	(Greece) Pa Tsitsipas
PR	(United Kingdom) R Peniston
(Ukraine) O Krutykh
(Greece) Ioannis Xilas
8	(Uzbekistan) S Fomin

Second round

Quarterfinals

Semifinals

=== Bottom half ===
First round
6	(Netherlands) M Röttgering
Q
A Kachmazov
Q
Q
Y Demin
Q
3	(Spain) R Carballés Baena
7	(Spain) A Sánchez Quílez
(Belgium) M Geerts
WC	(Greece) Dimitris Azoidis
(Bulgaria) D Kuzmanov
(Ukraine) N Mashtakov
Q
(United Kingdom) J Monday
2	(South Africa) P Henning

Second round

Quarterfinals

Semifinals
