= 2026 Plovdiv Challenger II =

- Date: 3 – 9 August
- Edition: 2nd
- Surface: Clay
- Location: Plovdiv, Bulgaria

Champions

Singles
- (Italy) Gabriele Piraino

Doubles
- (Brazil) João Victor Couto Loureiro / (Brazil) Eduardo Ribeiro
- Plovdiv Challenger

The 2026 Plovdiv Challenger II was a professional tennis tournament played on clay courts. It was the second edition of the tournament which was part of the 2026 ATP Challenger Tour. It took place in Plovdiv, Bulgaria between 3 and 9 August 2026.

== Singles main-draw entrants ==
=== Seeds ===
Country	Player	Rank^{1}	Seed
BRA	Pedro Boscardin Dias	256	1
ITA	Franco Agamenone	265	2
AUT	Sandro Kopp	286	3
COL	Daniel Elahi Galán	290	4
BOL	Murkel Dellien	327	5
ARG	Hernán Casanova	334	6
SRB	Ognjen Milić	336	7
ESP	Oriol Roca Batalla	338	8

- ^{1} Rankings are as of 27 July 2026.

=== Other entrants ===
The following players received wildcards into the singles main draw:

- (Bulgaria) Ivan Ivanov
- (Bulgaria) Yanaki Milev
- (Bulgaria) Alexander Vasilev

The following player received entry into the singles main draw through the Junior Accelerator programme:

- (France) Yannick Theodor Alexandrescou

The following players received entry into the singles main draw as alternates:

- (Italy) Lorenzo Angelini
- (Belgium) Émilien Demanet

The following players received entry from the qualifying draw:

- (Bulgaria) Adrian Andreev
- (South Korea) Gerard Campaña Lee
- (Bulgaria) Georgi Georgiev
- (Bulgaria) George Lazarov
- (Italy) Pietro Marino
- (Argentina) Franco Ribero

== Champions ==
=== Singles ===
- (Italy) Gabriele Piraino def. (Bulgaria) Petr Nesterov 6–1, 7–6^{(7–5)}.

=== Doubles ===
- (Brazil) João Victor Couto Loureiro / (Brazil) Eduardo Ribeiro def. (Serbia) Tadija Radovanović / (France) Cosme Rolland de Ravel 6–4, 6–2.
