= 2026 Crete Challenger IV – Doubles =

Doubles
- 2026 Crete Challenger IV

Events
Singles	Doubles
- Crete Challenger

Pavlos and Petros Tsitsipas were the defending champions but only Pavlos chose to defend his title, partnering Dimitris Azoidis.

== Seeds ==
1. (Israel) Daniel Cukierman / (Cyprus) Eleftherios Neos
2. (Ukraine) Oleksandr Ovcharenko / (United Kingdom) Mark Whitehouse
3. (Ukraine) Georgii Kravchenko / (Spain) Alejo Sánchez Quílez
4. (Ukraine) Volodymyr Uzhylovskyi / (Italy) Gabriele Volpi

== Draw ==
Key

- Q = Qualifier
- WC = Wild card
- LL = Lucky loser
- Alt = Alternate
- ITF = ITF entry
- PR = Protected ranking
- SR = Special ranking
- SE = Special exempt
- JE = Junior exempt
- JR = Junior Accelerator Programme entrant
- CO = College Accelerator Programme entrant
- NG = Next Gen Accelerator Program entrant
- w/o = Walkover
- r = Retired
- d = Defaulted

First round
1	(Israel) D Cukierman (Cyprus) E Neos
(South Africa) Vasilios Caripi (France) Benjamin Pietri
(Italy) G Cadenasso (Italy) J Vasamì
(Cyprus) M Efstathiou (Greece) Ioannis Xilas
3	(Ukraine) G Kravchenko (Spain) A Sánchez Quílez
(Ukraine) N Mashtakov (Ukraine) V Orlov
WC	(Greece) Victor Kalaitzis (Greece) Stefanos Schinas
(Spain) Imanol López Morillo (Bulgaria) Anas Mazdrashki
(Greece) Ioannis Kountourakis (Romania) Radu Mihai Papoe
(United Kingdom) Matthew Howse (United Kingdom) James Markiewicz
(Uzbekistan) S Fomin (Ukraine) O Krutykh
4	(Ukraine) V Uzhylovskyi (Italy) Gabriele Volpi
(Italy) F Arnaboldi (Italy) Juan Cruz Martin Manzano
(Belgium) M Geerts (Bulgaria) D Kuzmanov
WC	(Greece) Dimitris Azoidis (Greece) Pa Tsitsipas
2	(Ukraine) O Ovcharenko (United Kingdom) M Whitehouse

Quarterfinals
(Ukraine)
(Ukraine)

Semifinals

Final
