= 2026 Plovdiv Challenger =

- Date: 22 – 27 June
- Edition: 1st
- Surface: Clay
- Location: Plovdiv, Bulgaria

Champions

Singles
- (Spain) Iñaki Montes de la Torre

Doubles
- (Netherlands) Jarno Jans / (Netherlands) Niels Visker
- Plovdiv Challenger

The 2026 Plovdiv Challenger was a professional tennis tournament played on clay courts. It was the first edition of the tournament which was part of the 2026 ATP Challenger Tour. It took place in Plovdiv, Bulgaria between 22 and 27 June 2026.

== Singles main-draw entrants ==
=== Seeds ===
Country	Player	Rank^{1}	Seed
RSA	Philip Henning	252	1
CZE	Maxim Mrva	287	2
USA	Dali Blanch	291	3
POL	Daniel Michalski	303	4
ESP	Iñaki Montes de la Torre	309	5
FRA	Matteo Martineau	333	6
AUT	Sandro Kopp	337	7
SRB	Ognjen Milić	359	8

- ^{1} Rankings are as of 15 June 2026.

=== Other entrants ===
The following players received wildcards into the singles main draw:

- (Bulgaria) Yanaki Milev
- (Bulgaria) Iliyan Radulov
- (Bulgaria) Alexander Vasilev

The following player received entry into the singles main draw using a protected ranking:

- (Netherlands) Gijs Brouwer

The following player received entry into the singles main draw through the Junior Accelerator programme:

- (Spain) Andrés Santamarta Roig

The following player received entry into the singles main draw as an alternate:

- (Netherlands) Niels Visker

The following players received entry from the qualifying draw:

- (Italy) Lorenzo Angelini
- (Uzbekistan) Nikita Belozertsev
- (Poland) Tomasz Berkieta
- (Bulgaria) Dinko Dinev
- (Australia) Thomas Fancutt
- (Spain) Imanol López Morillo

== Champions ==
=== Singles ===
- (Spain) Iñaki Montes de la Torre def. (Austria) Sandro Kopp 7–6^{(7–5)}, 3–6, 7–6^{(10–8)}.

=== Doubles ===
- (Netherlands) Jarno Jans / (Netherlands) Niels Visker def. (Australia) Thomas Fancutt / (New Zealand) Ajeet Rai 6–4, 7–5.
