= 2024 Davis Cup World Group I play-offs =

Tennis tournament

The 2024 Davis Cup World Group I play-offs were held from 2 to 4 February 2024. The twelve winners of this round qualified for the 2024 Davis Cup World Group I while the twelve losers will compete at the 2024 Davis Cup World Group II.

== Teams ==
Twenty-four teams played for twelve spots in the World Group I, in series decided on a home and away basis.

These twenty-four teams were:

- 12 losing teams from 2023 World Group I
- 12 winning teams from 2023 World Group II

The 12 winning teams from the play-offs qualified for the World Group I and the 12 losing teams will play at the World Group II.

#: Nations Ranking as of 18 September 2023.

Seeded teams

1. Colombia (#20)
2. Japan (#24)
3. Austria (#27)
4. Ecuador (#28)
5. Norway (#29)
6. Romania (#30)
7. Bosnia and Herzegovina (#33)
8. Uzbekistan (#36)
9. Turkey (#37)
10. Denmark (#38)
11. India (#39)
12. Lithuania (#40)

Unseeded teams

- New Zealand (#41)
- Mexico (#42)
- Bulgaria (#43)
- Greece (#44)
- Pakistan (#45)
- Latvia (#47)
- Lebanon (#48)
- Ireland (#50)
- Poland (#51)
- Egypt (#55)
- Luxembourg (#64)
- Georgia (#66)

== Results summary ==
Home team	Score	Away team	Location	Venue	Surface
Colombia [1]	3–2	Luxembourg	Bogotá	Club Bellavista Colsubsidio	Clay
Lebanon	1–3	Japan [2]	Cairo (Egypt)	Smash Sporting Club	Clay
Ireland	0–4	Austria [3]	Limerick	UL Sport Arena	Hard (i)
Egypt	3–1	Ecuador [4]	Cairo	Gezira Sporting Club	Clay
Norway [5]	4–0	Latvia	Gjøvik	Gjøvik Olympic Cavern Hall	Hard (i)
Greece	4–0	Romania [6]	Ano Liosia	Ano Liosia Olympic Hall	Hard (i)
Bulgaria	1–3	Bosnia and Herzegovina [7]	Burgas	Tennis Center Avenue	Hard (i)
Uzbekistan [8]	0–4	Poland	Tashkent	Humo Arena	Hard (i)
New Zealand	1–3	Turkey [9]	Auckland	ASB Tennis Arena	Hard
Mexico	1–3	Denmark [10]	Zapopan	Hacienda San Javier	Clay
Pakistan	0–4	India [11]	Islamabad	Pakistan Sports Complex	Grass
Lithuania [12]	3–2	Georgia	Vilnius	SEB Arena	Hard (i)

== Results ==
=== Colombia vs. Luxembourg ===
Colombia
3
Club Bellavista Colsubsidio, Bogotá, Colombia
2–3 February 2024
Clay

Luxembourg
2

			1	2	3
1	(Colombia) (Luxembourg)	Nicolás Mejía; Chris Rodesch	6^{3} 7^{7}	3; 6
2	(Colombia) (Luxembourg)	Adrià Soriano; Alex Knaff	4; 6	6; 2	4; 6
3	(Colombia) (Luxembourg)	Nicolás Barrientos / Cristian Rodríguez; Alex Knaff / Chris Rodesch	6; 3	6^{1} 7^{7}	6; 1
4	(Colombia) (Luxembourg)	Nicolás Mejía; Alex Knaff	6; 2	6; 3
5	(Colombia) (Luxembourg)	Adrià Soriano; Chris Rodesch	6; 3	7^{7} 6^{5}

=== Lebanon vs. Japan ===
Lebanon
1
Smash Sporting Club, Cairo, Egypt
2–3 February 2024
Clay

Japan
3

			1	2	3
1	(Lebanon) (Japan)	Hady Habib; Yoshihito Nishioka	3; 6	4; 6
2	(Lebanon) (Japan)	Benjamin Hassan; Yosuke Watanuki	6; 2	7^{7} 6^{3}
3	(Lebanon) (Japan)	Hady Habib / Benjamin Hassan; Yoshihito Nishioka / Yosuke Watanuki	5; 7	5; 7
4	(Lebanon) (Japan)	Benjamin Hassan; Yoshihito Nishioka	6; 1	6^{2} 7^{7}	4; 6
5	(Lebanon) (Japan)	Hady Habib; Yosuke Watanuki				not played

=== Ireland vs. Austria ===
Ireland
0
UL Sport Arena, Limerick, Ireland
3–4 February 2024
Hard (i)

Austria
4

			1	2	3
1	(Republic of Ireland) (Austria)	Michael Agwi; Dominic Thiem	6^{6} 7^{8}	3; 6
2	(Republic of Ireland) (Austria)	Osgar O'Hoisin; Sebastian Ofner	4; 6	4; 6
3	(Republic of Ireland) (Austria)	Conor Gannon / David O'Hare; Alexander Erler / Lucas Miedler	1; 6	6^{5} 7^{7}
4	(Republic of Ireland) (Austria)	Michael Agwi; Lucas Miedler	3; 6	6; 3	8; 10
5	(Republic of Ireland) (Austria)	Osgar O'Hoisin; Dominic Thiem				not played

=== Egypt vs. Ecuador ===
Egypt
3
Gezira Sporting Club, Cairo, Egypt
2–3 February 2024
Clay

Ecuador
1

			1	2	3
1	(Egypt) (Ecuador)	Mohamed Safwat; Álvaro Guillén Meza	4; 6	7^{8} 6^{6}	7^{8} 6^{6}
2	(Egypt) (Ecuador)	Amr Elsayed; Emilio Gómez	7; 5	6; 3
3	(Egypt) (Ecuador)	Karim-Mohamed Maamoun / Mohamed Safwat; Andrés Andrade / Diego Hidalgo	7^{7} 6^{5}	7^{7} 6^{3}
4	(Egypt) (Ecuador)	Michael Bassem Sobhy; Andrés Andrade	6; 4	5; 7	7; 10
5	(Egypt) (Ecuador)	Amr Elsayed; Álvaro Guillén Meza				not played

=== Norway vs. Latvia ===
Norway
4
Gjøvik Olympic Cavern Hall, Gjøvik, Norway
2–3 February 2024
Hard (i)

Latvia
0

			1	2	3
1	(Norway) (Latvia)	Viktor Durasovic; Robert Strombachs	7; 5	6; 2
2	(Norway) (Latvia)	Casper Ruud; Mārtiņš Rocēns	6; 1	6; 1
3	(Norway) (Latvia)	Viktor Durasovic / Casper Ruud; Mārtiņš Rocēns / Robert Strombachs	6; 1	6; 3
4	(Norway) (Latvia)	Nicolai Budkov Kjær; Dāvis Rolis	6; 3	6; 4
5	(Norway) (Latvia)	Viktor Durasovic; Mārtiņš Rocēns				not played

=== Greece vs. Romania ===
Greece
4
Ano Liosia Olympic Hall, Ano Liosia, Greece
3–4 February 2024
Hard (i)

Romania
0

			1	2	3
1	(Greece) (Romania)	Stefanos Tsitsipas; Marius Copil	6; 3	6; 4
2	(Greece) (Romania)	Aristotelis Thanos; Nicholas David Ionel	4; 6	6; 3	6; 2
3	(Greece) (Romania)	Petros Tsitsipas / Stefanos Tsitsipas; Marius Copil / Victor Vlad Cornea	6^{4} 7^{7}	6; 3	6; 4
4	(Greece) (Romania)	Ioannis Xilas; Luca Preda	6; 1	6; 4
5	(Greece) (Romania)	Aristotelis Thanos; Marius Copil				not played

=== Bulgaria vs. Bosnia and Herzegovina ===
Bulgaria
1
Tennis Center Avenue, Burgas, Bulgaria
3–4 February 2024
Hard (i)

Bosnia and Herzegovina
3

			1	2	3
1	(Bulgaria) (Bosnia and Herzegovina)	Dimitar Kuzmanov; Nerman Fatić	6; 3	3; 6	4; 6
2	(Bulgaria) (Bosnia and Herzegovina)	Yanaki Milev; Damir Džumhur	3; 6	2; 6
3	(Bulgaria) (Bosnia and Herzegovina)	Alexander Donski / Alexandar Lazarov; Mirza Bašić / Damir Džumhur	6^{10} 7^{12}	3; 6
4	(Bulgaria) (Bosnia and Herzegovina)	Petr Nesterov; Andrej Nedić	4; 6	6; 2	10; 8
5	(Bulgaria) (Bosnia and Herzegovina)	Yanaki Milev; Nerman Fatić				not played

=== Uzbekistan vs. Poland ===
Uzbekistan
0
Humo Arena, Tashkent, Uzbekistan
2–3 February 2024
Hard (i)

Poland
4

			1	2	3
1	(Uzbekistan) (Poland)	Sergey Fomin; Hubert Hurkacz	2; 6	1; 6
2	(Uzbekistan) (Poland)	Khumoyun Sultanov; Maks Kaśnikowski	3; 6	1; 6
3	(Uzbekistan) (Poland)	Sergey Fomin / Khumoyun Sultanov; Hubert Hurkacz / Jan Zieliński	6^{1} 7^{7}	4; 6
4	(Uzbekistan) (Poland)	Maxim Shin; Kamil Majchrzak	1; 6	1; 6
5	(Uzbekistan) (Poland)	Sergey Fomin; Maks Kaśnikowski				not played

=== New Zealand vs. Turkey ===
New Zealand
1
ASB Tennis Arena, Auckland, New Zealand
2–3 February 2024
Hard

Turkey
3

			1	2	3
1	(New Zealand) (Turkey)	Kiranpal Pannu; Cem İlkel	6; 3	6; 2
2	(New Zealand) (Turkey)	Ajeet Rai; Yankı Erel	7^{7} 6^{5}	2; 6	4; 6
3	(New Zealand) (Turkey)	Marcus Daniell / Finn Reynolds; Altuğ Çelikbilek / Ergi Kırkın	6; 3	3; 6	6^{5} 7^{7}
4	(New Zealand) (Turkey)	Ajeet Rai; Altuğ Çelikbilek	3; 6	2; 6
5	(New Zealand) (Turkey)	Kiranpal Pannu; Yankı Erel				not played

=== Mexico vs. Denmark ===
Mexico
1
Hacienda San Javier, Zapopan, Mexico
3–4 February 2024
Clay

Denmark
3

			1	2	3
1	(Mexico) (Denmark)	Ernesto Escobedo; Elmer Møller	7; 5	2; 6	2; 6
2	(Mexico) (Denmark)	Rodrigo Pacheco Méndez; August Holmgren	7^{7} 6^{5}	6^{2} 7^{7}	6; 3
3	(Mexico) (Denmark)	Hans Hach Verdugo / Miguel Ángel Reyes-Varela; August Holmgren / Johannes Ingildsen	6^{1} 7^{7}	7^{7} 6^{1}	4; 6
4	(Mexico) (Denmark)	Ernesto Escobedo; August Holmgren	4; 6	4; 6
5	(Mexico) (Denmark)	Rodrigo Pacheco Méndez; Elmer Møller				not played

=== Pakistan vs. India ===
Pakistan
0
Pakistan Sports Complex, Islamabad, Pakistan
3–4 February 2024
Grass

India
4

			1	2	3
1	(Pakistan) (India)	Aisam-ul-Haq Qureshi; Ramkumar Ramanathan	7^{7} 6^{3}	6^{4} 7^{7}	0; 6
2	(Pakistan) (India)	Aqeel Khan; Sriram Balaji	5; 7	3; 6
3	(Pakistan) (India)	Aqeel Khan / Muzammil Murtaza; Yuki Bhambri / Saketh Myneni	2; 6	6^{5} 7^{7}
4	(Pakistan) (India)	Shoaib Khan; Niki Kaliyanda Poonacha	3; 6	4; 6
5	(Pakistan) (India)	Aisam-ul-Haq Qureshi; Sriram Balaji				not played

=== Lithuania vs. Georgia ===
Lithuania
3
SEB Arena, Vilnius, Lithuania
3–4 February 2024
Hard (i)

Georgia
2

			1	2	3
1	(Lithuania) (Georgia (country))	Vilius Gaubas; Saba Purtseladze	3; 6	6; 1	5; 7
2	(Lithuania) (Georgia (country))	Ričardas Berankis; Zura Tkemaladze	6; 2	6; 2
3	(Lithuania) (Georgia (country))	Tadas Babelis / Edas Butvilas; Aleksandre Bakshi / Aleksandre Metreveli	5; 7	6; 4	4; 6
4	(Lithuania) (Georgia (country))	Ričardas Berankis; Saba Purtseladze	7^{7} 6^{5}	3; 6	7^{9} 6^{7}
5	(Lithuania) (Georgia (country))	Vilius Gaubas; Zura Tkemaladze	7; 5	6; 3
