= 2026 Crete Challenger IV =

- Date: 23 – 29 November
- Edition: 10th
- Surface: Hard
- Location: Hersonissos, Greece
- Crete Challenger

The 2026 Crete Challenger IV was a professional tennis tournament played on hardcourts. It was the tenth edition of the tournament which was part of the 2026 ATP Challenger Tour. It took place in Hersonissos, Greece between 23 and 29 November 2026.

== Singles main-draw entrants ==
=== Seeds ===
Country	Player	Rank^{1}	Seed
ITA	Gianluca Cadenasso	215	1
RSA	Philip Henning	233	2
ESP	Roberto Carballés Baena	267	3
UKR	Georgii Kravchenko	275	4
ROU	Radu Mihai Papoe	280	5
NED	Mees Röttgering	302	6
ESP	Alejo Sánchez Quílez	319	7
UZB	Sergey Fomin	332	8

- ^{1} Rankings are as of 16 November 2026.

=== Other entrants ===
The following players received wildcards into the singles main draw:

- (Greece) Dimitris Azoidis
- (Greece) Ioannis Kountourakis
- (Greece) Pavlos Tsitsipas

The following player received entry into the singles main draw using a protected ranking:

- (United Kingdom) Ryan Peniston

The following players received entry from the qualifying draw:

The following player received entry as a lucky loser:

== Champions ==
=== Singles ===
- vs.

=== Doubles ===
- / vs. /
