= Ajeet Rai =

New Zealander tennis player (born 1999)

- Country (sports): New Zealand
- Born: 18 January 1999 (age 27) New Plymouth, New Zealand
- Height: 1.88 m (6 ft 2 in)
- Plays: Right-handed (two-handed backhand)
- Coach: Rakesh Rai
- Prize money: US $159,793

Singles
- Career record: 2–10 (at ATP Tour level, Grand Slam level, and in Davis Cup)
- Career titles: 3 ITF
- Highest ranking: No. 417 (10 April 2023)
- Current ranking: No. 1,194 (16 November 2026)

Doubles
- Career record: 6–5
- Career titles: 1 Challenger, 14 ITF
- Highest ranking: No. 146 (16 November 2026)
- Current ranking: No. 146 (16 November 2026)

Team competitions
- Davis Cup: 3–8 (singles 2-8)
- Last updated on: 16 November 2026.

Ajeet Shankar Rai (born 18 January 1999) is a New Zealand professional tennis player. Rai has a career-high singles ranking by the ATP of No. 417 achieved on 10 April 2023 and a best doubles ranking of world No. 146 achieved on 16 November 2026.

== Tennis career ==
=== 2018 ===
Rai's first experience of professional tennis was being given a wildcard into qualifying for the Auckland Open, where he was beaten by Taro Daniel in the first round. He played his first senior ITF tournament in Kampala, Uganda, in May, qualifying for the main draw in singles, where he reached the second round. The following week, at the same venue, he was given a wildcard into both doubles and the main draw for singles, and reached the quarterfinals of both.

He reached his first doubles semifinal in China in July, but the highlight of his year to that date would come in September, when he made his Davis Cup debut for New Zealand, partnering Artem Sitak to win their doubles rubber against South Korea, giving Rai a perfect start to his senior international representative career. His first ITF doubles final came in Hua Hin, Thailand, in October, where he and Karunuday Singh lost in a match tie-break to the top seeds, Francis Casey Alcantara and Sonchat Ratiwatana. In singles at the same tournament, he progressed past the quarterfinals for the first time, going all the way to take the title over Manish Sureshkumar in three sets. His season finished with a couple of quarterfinal losses in Futures events in Tây Ninh, Vietnam.

=== 2019 ===
Again given a wildcard into qualifying in Auckland, Rai was a game away from defeating Roberto Marcora in the first round before eventually losing in three sets. He and New Zealand junior champion George Stoupe were given a wild card into the doubles, where they lost in the first round to Artem Sitak and Austin Krajicek.

In Uganda on the anniversary of his ITF debut, Rai injured his back severely enough in his second event to need three months' rehabilitation before he returned to the tour in South-East Asia. Well-beaten in his first match, he steadily improved through a series of tournaments to reach another doubles final in Hua Hin in August. By the worst possible luck, his partner, former dual Australian Open junior doubles winner Bradley Mousley, injured his knee in his singles semifinal earlier in the day and had to retire from that match. He played the doubles final, but with very restricted movement the pair were easily beaten by the top-seeded Ratiwatana twins from the host country.

Rai reached two more ITF doubles finals before the end of the year, in Hua Hin two weeks later and in Cancún, Mexico, in late November, finishing runner-up on each occasion.

=== 2020 ===
With the ITF Circuit returning to New Zealand for the first time in several years, Rai's first event for 2020 was at the new tournament in Te Anau, where he lost in the quarter-finals of both singles and doubles. At the ASB Classic in Auckland, Rai received a wildcard into both the singles qualifying rounds and the doubles, losing his first match in both. The doubles defeat, however, came at the hands of the eventual champions, Luke Bambridge and Ben McLachlan, and Rai and partner Mackenzie McDonald played extremely well.

Rai's next stop after Auckland was Cancún, where he played three tournaments in as many weeks. The second was the most productive, reaching the quarterfinals in singles and finally securing a doubles title, in his fifth final. Rai then returned home for New Zealand's Davis Cup tie against Venezuela in Auckland, where he lost in singles to Luis David Martínez in three sets. He didn't play again before the international tour was suspended due to the COVID-19 pandemic, and his only subsequent events were domestic tournaments such as the New Zealand Premier League, Wellington Open/New Zealand Championships (where he finished runner-up) and the Te Anau Invitational.

=== 2021 ===
Rai resumed his international career in June, playing a series of ITF tournaments in Monastir over the next couple of months. He reached several doubles finals but, frustratingly, it took five attempts before he was able to win another title. Apart from a brief trip to Spain to renew his visa, he stayed in Monastir until November, eventually winning six doubles titles from 11 finals before returning to New Zealand.

=== 2022 ===
Rai made three more ITF singles finals, winning the last of them. He also took the doubles title at Nonthaburi in his first ATP Challenger event.

== ATP Challenger and ITF Circuit finals ==
=== Singles: 8 (4 titles, 4 runner-ups) ===
Legend ATP Challenger ITF 25,000 (1–2) ITF 15,000 (3–2)	Finals by surface Hard (4–4) Clay (0–0)

Result	No.	Date	Level	Tournament	Surface	Opponent	Score
Win	1.	13 October 2018	15k	Hua Hin, Thailand	Hard	(India) Manish Sureshkumar	6–3, 4–6, 6–4
Loss	1.	28 August 2022	M15	Changwon, Korea Rep.	Hard	(South Korea) Lee Jea-moon	4–6, 4–6
Loss	2.	9 October 2022	M25	Tây Ninh, Vietnam	Hard	(Vietnam) Lý Hoàng Nam	4–6, 4–6
Win	2.	18 December 2022	M15	Wellington, New Zealand	Hard (i) ^{[Note 1]}	(New Zealand) James Watt	6–2, 6–4
Win	3.	8 October 2023	M25	Cairns, Australia	Hard	(Australia) Jeremy Beale	3–2, ret.
Loss	3.	16 June 2024	M15	Hong Kong, China SAR	Hard	(Russia) Evgenii Tiurnev	4–6, 2–6
Loss	4.	24 November 2024	M25	Caloundra, Australia	Hard	(United States) Christian Langmo	6–7^{(4–7)}, 6–1, 4–6
Win	4.	15 December 2024	M15	Wellington, New Zealand	Hard	(Australia) Tai Sach	6–4, 6–2

Note 1: this was an outdoor tournament, but several matches, including the final, were played indoors due to bad weather.

=== Doubles: 44 (23 titles, 21 runner-ups) ===
Legend ATP Challenger (2–4) ITF $25,000 (12–6) ITF $15,000 (9–11)	Finals by surface Hard (19–19) Clay (2–1) Grass (2–1)

Result	No.	Date	Level	Tournament	Surface	Partner	Opponents	Score
Loss	1.	12 October 2018	15,000	Hua Hin, Thailand	Hard	(India) Karunuday Singh	(Philippines) Francis Casey Alcantara (Thailand) Sonchat Ratiwatana	1–6, 6–1, [6–10]
Loss	2.	24 August 2019	M15	Hua Hin, Thailand	Hard	(Australia) Bradley Mousley	(Thailand) Sanchai Ratiwatana (Thailand) Sonchat Ratiwatana	2–6, 0–6
Loss	3.	7 September 2019	M15	Hua Hin, Thailand	Hard	(United Kingdom) George Loffhagen	(Chinese Taipei) Ray Ho (Canada) Kelsey Stevenson	6–7^{(4–7)}, 2–6
Loss	4.	23 November 2019	M15	Cancún, Mexico	Hard	(Australia) Cameron Green	(Hong Kong) Skyler Butts (United States) Nicholas Bybel	5–7, 5–7
Win	1.	1 February 2020	M15	Cancún, Mexico	Hard	(Republic of Ireland) Simon Carr	(France) Gabriel Petit (Australia) Brandon Walkin	6–4, 6–2
Loss	5.	29 May 2021	M15	Monastir, Tunisia	Hard	(India) Siddhant Banthia	(Australia) Jeremy Beale (Australia) Thomas Fancutt	4–6, 4–6
Loss	6.	12 June 2021	M15	Monastir, Tunisia	Hard	(Australia) Jeremy Beale	(India) Siddhant Banthia (South Korea) Park Ui-sung	w/o
Loss	7.	26 June 2021	M15	Monastir, Tunisia	Hard	(Spain) Benjamin Winter Lopez	(United Kingdom) Julian Cash (United Kingdom) Mark Whitehouse	6–7^{(1–7)}, 3–6
Loss	8.	17 July 2021	M15	Monastir, Tunisia	Hard	(Australia) Jeremy Beale	(France) Arthur Bouquier (Argentina) Santiago Rodríguez Taverna	7–5, 4–6, [7–10]
Win	2.	7 August 2021	M15	Monastir, Tunisia	Hard	(Australia) Blake Ellis	(Japan) Taisei Ichikawa (Japan) Seita Watanabe	6–2, 6–3
Win	3.	11 September 2021	M15	Monastir, Tunisia	Hard	(Italy) Mattia Bellucci	(Brazil) Gabriel Décamps (Germany) Robert Strombachs	7–6^{(7–1)}, 6–7^{(5–7)}, [10–4]
Win	4.	18 September 2021	M15	Monastir, Tunisia	Hard	(Australia) Li Tu	(France) Martin Breysach (France) Lilian Marmousez	6–0, 6–4
Loss	9.	25 September 2021	M15	Monastir, Tunisia	Hard	(Italy) Giorgio Ricca	(Burundi) Guy Orly Iradukunda (Russia) Marat Sharipov	3–6, 6–4, [6–10]
Win	5.	16 October 2021	M15	Monastir, Tunisia	Hard	(Argentina) Mateo Nicolás Martínez	(Tunisia) Anis Ghorbel (Switzerland) Mirko Martinez	6–7^{(1–7)}, 6–4, [11–9]
Win	6.	30 October 2021	M15	Monastir, Tunisia	Hard	(Switzerland) Mirko Martinez	(France) Théo Arribagé (France) Axel Garcian	6–4, 1–6, [10–8]
Win	7.	6 November 2021	M15	Monastir, Tunisia	Hard	(Switzerland) Mirko Martinez	(Belgium) Pierre-Yves Bailly (Belgium) Martin Katz	3–6, 7–6^{(7–5)}, [10–8]
Win	8.	27 August 2022	M15	Changwon, Korea Rep.	Hard	(Australia) Thomas Fancutt	(South Korea) Jeong Yeong-seok (South Korea) Lee Jea-moon	5–7, 6–4, [10–8]
Win	9.	10 September 2022	Challenger	Nonthaburi, Thailand	Hard	(South Korea) Chung Yun-seong	(Philippines) Francis Casey Alcantara (Indonesia) Christopher Rungkat	6–1, 7–6^{(8–6)}
Loss	10.	5 November 2022	Challenger	Sydney, Australia	Hard	(Japan) Yuta Shimizu	(Australia) Blake Ellis (Australia) Tristan Schoolkate	6–4, 5–7, [9–11]
Win	10.	23 September 2023	M25	Darwin, Australia	Hard	(Australia) Thomas Fancutt	(Australia) Blake Bayldon (Australia) Brandon Walkin	6–1, 6–4
Win	11.	25 November 2023	M25	Brisbane, Australia	Hard	(Australia) Thomas Fancutt	(Australia) Joshua Charlton (United Kingdom) Emile Hudd	6–4, 6–4
Win	12.	3 December 2023	M25	Carrara, Australia	Hard	(Australia) Thomas Fancutt	(Australia) Blake Bayldon (Australia) Kody Pearson	7–1, 7–6^{(12–10)}
Loss	11.	27 January 2024	Challenger	Indian Wells, USA	Hard	(Australia) Thomas Fancutt	(United States) Ryan Seggerman (United States) Patrik Trhac	4–6, 6–3, [3–10]
Loss	12.	2 March 2024	M25	Traralgon, Australia	Hard	(Australia) Jesse Delaney	(Australia) Joshua Charlton (Australia) Blake Ellis	1–6, 3–6
Win	13	23 March 2024	M25	Swan Hill, Australia	Grass	(Australia) Hayden Jones	(Australia) Jesse Delaney (Australia) Luke Saville	6–4, 6–4
Win	14	18 May 2024	M25	Luan, China	Hard	(China) Sun Fajing	(China) Cui Jie (South Korea) Lee Duck-hee	6–2, 6–2
Loss	13.	15 June 2024	M15	Hong Kong, China	Hard	(India) Rishi Reddy	(Japan) Tomohiro Masabayashi (Thailand) Thantub Suksumrarn	3–6, 5–7
Win	15	17 August 2024	M25	Yinchuan, China	Hard	(China) Wang Aoran	(South Africa) Philip Henning (South Africa) Kris van Wyk	6–4, 6–4
Win	16.	15 December 2024	M15	Wellington, New Zealand	Hard	(New Zealand) Isaac Becroft	(Australia) Tai Sach (New Zealand) Anton Shepp	6–1, 6–3
Loss	14	16 March 2025	M25	Mildura, Australia	Grass	(Australia) Joshua Charlton	(Australia) Matt Hulme (Australia) James Watt	7–6^{(9–7)}, 6–7^{(1–7)}, [11–13]
Win	17	23 March 2025	M25	Swan Hill, Australia	Grass	(Australia) Joshua Charlton	(Australia) Jake Delaney (Australia) Jesse Delaney	6–4, 6–4
Loss	15	17 May 2025	M25	Tbilisi, Georgia	Hard	(Japan) Kaichi Uchida	(Georgia (country)) Aleksandre Bakshi (Slovakia) Lukáš Pokorný	2–6, 4–6
Loss	16	29 June 2025	M25	Monastir, Tunisia	Hard	(Republic of Ireland) Charles Barry	Sergey Betov; Daniil Ostapenkov	5–7, 4–6
Loss	17	17 August 2025	M25	Bali, Indonesia	Hard	(New Zealand) Alexander Klintcharov	(Japan) Kokoro Isomura (Japan) Shunsuke Nakagawa	2–6, 2–6
Win	18	12 October 2025	M25	Perth, Australia	Hard	(United Kingdom) Finn Bass	(Japan) Masamichi Imamura (Japan) Naoki Tajima	6–1, 7–6^{(7–3)}
Loss	18.	21 December 2025	M15	Tauranga, New Zealand	Hard	(New Zealand) Anton Shepp	(Australia) Jesse Delaney (United Kingdom) Emile Hudd	2–6, 2–6
Win	19.	26 April 2026	M25	Sharm El Sheikh, Egypt	Hard	(Australia) Thomas Fancutt	(Slovakia) Lukáš Pokorný (Germany) Niklas Schell	7–6^{(7–3)}, 6–1
Win	20.	3 May 2026	M25	Quinta do Lago, Portugal	Hard	(Australia) Thomas Fancutt	(Spain) John Echeverría (Portugal) Tiago Torres	6–3, 7–6^{(7–2)}
Loss	19.	10 May 2026	M25	Loulé, Portugal	Hard	(Australia) Thomas Fancutt	(Canada) Justin Boulais (Portugal) Tiago Pereira	6–7^{(5–7)}, 7–6^{(7–3)}, [4–10]
Win	21.	24 May 2026	M25	Bol, Croatia	Clay	(Australia) Thomas Fancutt	(Croatia) Admir Kalender (Serbia) Matej Sabanov	7–6^{(7–3)}, 6–3
Win	22	7 June 2026	M25	Caltanissetta, Italy	Clay	(Australia) Thomas Fancutt	(Italy) Alessandro Coccioli (Italy) Lorenzo Lorusso	7–6^{(7–4)}, 6–1
Loss	20.	28 June 2026	Challenger	Plovdiv, Bulgaria	Clay	(Australia) Thomas Fancutt	(Netherlands) Jarno Jans (Netherlands) Niels Visker	4–6, 5–7
Win	23.	22 August 2026	Challenger	Quebec City, Canada	Hard	(Bulgaria) Alexander Donski	(Canada) Justin Boulais (Canada) Duncan Chan	6–3, 4–6, [10–3]
Loss	21.	7 November 2026	Challenger	Taipei, Taiwan	Hard (i)	(India) Anirudh Chandrasekar	(New Zealand) Finn Reynolds (New Zealand) James Watt	3–6, 2–6

== Davis Cup (11) ==
Group membership
World Group (0)
Group I (1–8)
Group II (2–0)
Group III (0)
Group IV (0)

- ▲ ▼ indicates the outcome of the Davis Cup match followed by the score, date, place of event, the zonal classification and its phase, and the court surface.

Rubber outcome	No.	Rubber	Match type (partner if any)	Opponent nation	Opponent player(s)	Score
▼2–3; 14-15 September 2018; Gimcheon Sports Town Tennis Courts, Gimcheon, South Korea; Asia/Oceania Group I Relegation playoff, 2nd round playoff; Hard (i) surface
Victory	1.	III	Doubles (with Artem Sitak)	South Korea	Hong Seong-chan / Lee Jea-moon	7–5, 6–3
▲3–1; 14-15 September 2019; Gelora Bung Karno Sports Complex, Jakarta, Indonesia; Asia/Oceania Zone Group II playoffs (first round); Hard surface
Victory	2.	I	Singles	Indonesia	Muhammad Rifqi Fitriadi	7–6^{(9–7)}, 6–3
Defeat	1.	IV	Singles (dead rubber)	Indonesia	Ari Fahresi	3–6, 6–2, [7–10]
▲3–1; 6-7 March 2020; ASB Tennis Centre, Auckland, New Zealand; World Group I Play-offs, 1st round playoff; Hard surface
Defeat	2.	II	Singles	Venezuela	Luis David Martínez	7–5, 4–6, 2–6
▲3–1; 4-5 March 2022; Darling Tennis Center, Las Vegas, United States; World Group I Play-offs, 1st round playoff; Hard surface
Defeat	3.	II	Singles	Uruguay	Pablo Cuevas	4–6, 2–6
▼0–5; 16-17 September 2022; Espoo Metro Areena, Espoo, Finland; World Group I 1st round; Hard (i) surface
Defeat	4.	II	Singles	Finland	Otto Virtanen	4–6, 3–6
▼1–3; 4-5 February 2023; Wilding Park, Christchurch, New Zealand; World Group I Play-offs, 1st round playoff; Hard surface
Defeat	5.	I	Singles	Bulgaria	Alexander Lazarov	6–7^{(1–7)}, 2–6
Defeat	6.	IV	Singles	Bulgaria	Dimitar Kuzmanov	3–6, 7–5, 4–6
▲3–1; 15-16 September 2023; ILT Stadium, Invercargill, New Zealand; World Group II (first round); Hard (i) surface
Victory	3.	II	Singles	Thailand	Maximus Jones	6–1, 6–3
▼1–3; 2-3 February 2024; ASB Tennis Centre, Auckland, New Zealand; World Group I Play-offs, 1st round playoff; Hard surface
Defeat	7.	II	Singles	(Turkey) Türkiye	Yankı Erel	7–6^{(7–5)}, 2–6, 4–6
Defeat	8.	IV	Singles	(Turkey) Türkiye	Altuğ Çelikbilek	3–6, 2–6
