= Thomas Fancutt =

Australian tennis player

- Country (sports): Australia
- Residence: Brisbane, Australia
- Born: 25 February 1995 (age 31) Brisbane, Australia
- Height: 1.88 m (6 ft 2 in)
- Plays: Right-handed (one-handed backhand)
- Coach: Blazo Djurovic
- Prize money: US $184,454

Singles
- Career record: 0–1 (at ATP Tour level, Grand Slam level, and in Davis Cup)
- Career titles: 2 ITF
- Highest ranking: No. 382 (22 May 2023)
- Current ranking: No. 1,728 (20 April 2026)

Doubles
- Career record: 3–4 (at ATP Tour level, Grand Slam level, and in Davis Cup)
- Career titles: 5 Challenger, 26 ITF
- Highest ranking: No. 107 (2 December 2024)
- Current ranking: No. 1,267 (20 April 2026)

Grand Slam doubles results
- Australian Open: 1R (2025)
- Last updated on: 20 April 2026.

Thomas John Fancutt (born 25 February 1995) is an Australian tennis player. He has a career high ATP doubles ranking of world No. 107 achieved on 2 December 2024 and a career high singles ranking of No. 382 achieved on 22 May 2023.

== Personal life ==
Fancutt comes from a tennis-playing family, with his grandfather Trevor, grandmother Daphne, uncles Charlie and Michael and father Chris all former professional tennis players.

== Career ==
=== 2013-2021: ATP debut ===
In September 2013, Fancutt made his debut on the ITF circuit at the Australia F6.

In July 2016, Fancutt won his first ITF title in Anning, China.

In February 2021, Fancutt made his ATP main draw debut at the 2021 Great Ocean Road Open, where he was an alternate into the singles main draw.

=== 2024-2025: Major debut, Five ATP Challenger titles in doubles ===
In March 2024, Fancutt alongside American Hunter Reese claimed the doubles title at the Rwanda Challenger. As a result, Fancutt rose to a career high doubles ranking of No. 205 on 18 March 2024.

Ranked No. 140, he made the main draw of the 2024 Hangzhou Open with partner Blake Bayldon as a direct entry, following the withdrawal of Sander Gillé and Joran Vliegen.

In October, Fancutt, along with Blake Ellis won consecutive challenger doubles titles in Playford and Sydney. This resulted in Fancutt rising to a career high doubles ranking of No. 121 on 4 November 2024.

In 2025, he entered the doubles main draw of the 2025 Australian Open with Blake Ellis as a wildcard pair.

== Ten-month ITIA ban ==
Fancutt was suspended from competition by the International Tennis Integrity Agency for 10 months, starting from March 2025, after he admitted to breaching limits on IV fluid intake.

== ATP Challengers and ITF Tour finals ==
=== Singles: 8 (3–5) ===
Legend
ATP Challengers (0–0)
ITF Futures/World Tennis Tour (3–5)

Result	W–L	Date	Tournament	Tier	Surface	Opponent	Score
Win	1–0	Jul 2016	Anning, China	Futures	Clay	(Japan) Issei Okamura	6–2, 6–4
Loss	1–1	Mar 2018	Mildura, Australia	Futures	Grass	(Australia) Marc Polmans	6–7, 3–6
Loss	1–2	May 2021	M15 Monastir, Tunesia	World Tennis Tour	Hard	(Ivory Coast) Eliakim Coulibaly	6–2, 2–6, 6−7^{(1−7)}
Loss	1–3	Jun 2022	M15 Tay Ninh, Vietnam	World Tennis Tour	Hard	(Vietnam) Lý Hoàng Nam	3–6, 4–6
Loss	1–4	Jul 2022	M15 Caloundra, Australia	World Tennis Tour	Hard	(Australia) Dane Sweeny	3–6, 4–6
Loss	1–5	Oct 2022	M25 Jakarta, Indonesia	World Tennis Tour	Hard	(France) Arthur Weber	6–7^{(9−11)}, 6–7^{(9−11)}
Win	2–5	Mar 2023	M25 Swan Hill, Australia	World Tennis Tour	Grass	(Australia) Luke Saville	6–4, 6–7^{(3−7)}, 7–5
Win	3–5	Apr 2026	M25 Sharm El Sheikh, Egypt	World Tennis Tour	Hard	(Latvia) Robert Strombachs	6–3, 7–3^{(7−3)}

=== Doubles: 56 (35 titles, 21 runners-up) ===
Legend
ATP Challengers (5–5)
ITF Futures/World Tennis Tour (30–16)

Result	W–L	Date	Tournament	Tier	Surface	Partner	Opponents	Score
Loss	0–1	Sep 2015	Tehran, Iran	Futures	Clay	(Iran) Amirvala Madanchi	(France) Maxime Janvier (France) Gabriel Petit	6–7^{(3–7)}, 1–6
Win	1–1	Sep 2015	Tehran, Iran	Futures	Clay	(Iran) Amirvala Madanchi	(Iran) Alborz Akhavan (Iran) Mohsen Hossein Zade	7–6^{(7–4)}, 6–4
Loss	1–2	Sep 2015	Tehran, Iran	Futures	Clay	(Iran) Amirvala Madanchi	(France) Gabriel Petit (France) François-Arthur Vibert	3–6, 1–6
Loss	1–3	Oct 2015	Brisbane, Australia	Futures	Hard	(Australia) Darren Polkinghorne	(Australia) Steven de Waard (Australia) Marc Polmans	0–6, 1–6
Win	2–3	Jul 2016	Anning, China	Futures	Clay	(Australia) Mitchell Robins	(Japan) Koichi Sano (Japan) Shunrou Takeshima	7–6^{(8–6)}, 6–4
Win	3–3	Aug 2016	Telavi, Georgia	Futures	Clay	(Australia) Mitchell Robins	(Hungary) Gábor Borsos (Lithuania) Lukas Mugevičius	4–6, 7–6^{(7–5)}, [10–8]
Win	4–3	Aug 2016	Telavi, Georgia	Futures	Clay	(Australia) Mitchell Robins	(Uzbekistan) Shonigmatjon Shofayziyev (Georgia (country)) George Tsivadze	4–6, 6–3, [13–11]
Loss	4–4	Sep 2016	Alice Springs, Australia	Futures	Hard	(Australia) Calum Puttergill	(Australia) Marc Polmans (Australia) Luke Saville	1–6, 2–6
Loss	4–5	Feb 2017	Anning, China	Futures	Clay	(Australia) Brandon Walkin	(Italy) Marco Bortolotti (Croatia) Nino Serdarušić	7–6^{(8–6)}, 3–6, [8–10]
Win	5–5	Mar 2017	Anning, China	Futures	Clay	(Australia) Brandon Walkin	(China) Bai Yan (China) Cai Zhao	6–4, 6–4
Loss	5–6	Jun 2017	Hua Hin, Thailand	Futures	Hard	(Australia) Jeremy Beale	(France) Yannick Jankovits (France) Clément Larrière	3–6, 6–3, [9–11]
Win	6–6	Mar 2018	Renmark, Australia	Futures	Grass	(Australia) Jeremy Beale	(Australia) Dayne Kelly (Australia) Gavin van Peperzeel	6–3, 6–7^{(5–7)}, [10-7]
Win	7–6	Mar 2018	Mildura, Australia	Futures	Grass	(Australia) Jeremy Beale	(Australia) Edward Bourchier (Australia) Harry Bourchier	6–4, 6–4
Loss	7–7	Jun 2017	Tumon, Guam	Futures	Hard	(Australia) Jake Delaney	(Japan) Hiroyasu Ehara (Japan) Sho Katayama	3–6, 3–6
Loss	7–8	Aug 2018	Nonthaburi, Thailand	Futures	Hard	(Thailand) Chanchai Sookton-eng	(United States) Ronnie Schneider (India) Karunuday Singh	7–5, 1–6, [5-10]
Win	8–8	Sep 2018	Darwin, Australia	Futures	Hard	(Australia) Jeremy Beale	(United Kingdom) Brydan Klein (Australia) Scott Puodziunas	7–6^{(7–4)}, 6–3
Win	9–8	Oct 2018	Brisbane, Australia	Futures	Hard	(Australia) Jeremy Beale	(United Kingdom) Brydan Klein (Australia) Scott Puodziunas	2–6 6–4, [10-6]
Loss	9–9	Nov 2018	Canberra, Australia	Futures	Hard	(Australia) Jeremy Beale	(United Kingdom) Evan Hoyt (Chinese Taipei) Wu Tung-lin	6–7^{(5–7)}, 7–5, [8-10]
Loss	9–10	Mar 2019	M15 Mornington, Australia	World Tennis Tour	Clay	(Australia) Dane Sweeny	(Australia) Calum Puttergill (Australia) Brandon Walkin	1–6, 5–7
Loss	9–11	Jun 2019	M15 Heraklion, Greece	World Tennis Tour	Hard	(Australia) Calum Puttergill	(Spain) Andrés Artuñedo Martinavarro (Spain) Pablo Vivero González	2–6, 2–6
Loss	9–12	Jul 2019	M15 Gimcheon, South Korea	World Tennis Tour	Hard	(Thailand) Chanchai Sookton-eng	(South Korea) Choi Jae-won (South Korea) Moon Ju-hae	6–7^{(4–7)}, 3–6
Loss	9–13	Sep 2019	M25 Darwin, Australia	World Tennis Tour	Hard	(Australia) Matthew Romios	(Australia) Dayne Kelly (United Kingdom) Brydan Klein	5–7, 5–7
Win	10–13	Mar 2020	M25 Mildura, Australia	World Tennis Tour	Hard	(Australia) Jeremy Beale	(United Kingdom) Brydan Klein (Australia) Scott Puodziunas	4–6, 7–6^{(8–6)}, [10-3]
Win	11–13	May 2021	M15 Monastir, Tunisia	World Tennis Tour	Hard	(Australia) Jeremy Beale	(Tunisia) Aziz Dougaz (Burundi) Guy Orly Iradukunda	6–4, 3–6, [10–6]
Win	12–13	May 2021	M15 Monastir, Tunisia	World Tennis Tour	Hard	(Australia) Jeremy Beale	(Argentina) Tomás Farjat (Argentina) Santiago Rodríguez Taverna	6–3, 6–4
Win	13–13	May 2021	M15 Monastir, Tunisia	World Tennis Tour	Hard	(Australia) Jeremy Beale	(India) Siddhant Banthia (New Zealand) Ajeet Rai	6–4, 6–4
Win	14–13	Jun 2021	M15 Monastir, Tunisia	World Tennis Tour	Hard	(Australia) Jeremy Beale	(Argentina) Tomás Farjat (Argentina) Santiago Rodríguez Taverna	6–1, 7–5
Win	15–13	Jul 2021	M15 Almada, Portugal	World Tennis Tour	Hard	(United Kingdom) Evan Hoyt	(Portugal) Fábio Coelho (Brazil) Natan Rodrigues	6–4, 6–2
Win	16–13	Jul 2021	M25 Idanha-a-Nova, Portugal	World Tennis Tour	Hard	(United Kingdom) Evan Hoyt	(Japan) Takuto Niki (Japan) Kaito Uesugi	6–3, 6–2
Win	17–13	Aug 2021	M15 Monastir, Tunisia	World Tennis Tour	Hard	(Australia) Jeremy Beale	(Argentina) Mateo Nicolás Martínez (Argentina) Santiago Rodríguez Taverna	3–6, 7–6^{(7–1)}, [13–11]
Win	18-13	Aug 2021	M15 Monastir, Tunisia	World Tennis Tour	Hard	(Australia) Jeremy Beale	(Lebanon) Hady Habib (Argentina) Mateo Nicolás Martínez	6–4, 7–6^{(7–4)}
Loss	18–14	Oct 2021	M15 Tallahassee, United States	World Tennis Tour	Hard (indoor)	(Northern Mariana Islands) Colin Sinclair	(Canada) Liam Draxl (United States) John McNally	2–6, 3–6
Win	19-14	Jul 2022	M15 Caloundra, Australia	World Tennis Tour	Hard	(Australia) Jeremy Beale	(Australia) Aaron Addison (Australia) Matthew Romios	7–6^{(7–1)}, 6–3
Win	20–14	Aug 2022	M15 Changwon, South Korea	World Tennis Tour	Hard	(New Zealand) Ajeet Rai	(South Korea) Jeong Yeong-seok (South Korea) Lee Jea-moon	5–7, 6–4, [10–8]
Win	21–14	Oct 2022	M25 Jakarta, Indonesia	World Tennis Tour	Hard	(Australia) Brandon Walkin	(Japan) Seita Watanabe (China) Sun Fajing	4–6, 6–3, [10–6]
Win	22–14	Sep 2023	M25 Darwin, Australia	World Tennis Tour	Hard	(Australia) Jeremy Beale	(Australia) Joshua Charlton (Australia) Blake Ellis	6–4, 6–4
Win	23–14	Sep 2023	M25 Darwin, Australia	World Tennis Tour	Hard	(New Zealand) Ajeet Rai	(Australia) Blake Bayldon (Australia) Brandon Walkin	6–1, 6–4
Win	24–14	Oct 2023	M25 Cairns, Australia	World Tennis Tour	Hard	(Australia) Jeremy Beale	(Chinese Taipei) Hong-Lin Fu (Australia) Tomislav Edward Papac	6–4, 6–4
Win	25–14	Nov 2023	M25 Brisbane, Australia	World Tennis Tour	Hard	(New Zealand) Ajeet Rai	(Australia) Joshua Charlton (United Kingdom) Emile Hudd	6–4, 6–4
Win	26–14	Nov 2023	M25 Gold Coast, Australia	World Tennis Tour	Hard	(New Zealand) Ajeet Rai	(Australia) Blake Bayldon (Australia) Kody Pearson	7–5, 7–6^{(12–10)}
Loss	26–15	Jan 2024	Indian Wells, USA	Challenger	Hard	(New Zealand) Ajeet Rai	(United States) Ryan Seggerman (United States) Patrik Trhac	6–4, 3–6, [10–3]
Loss	26–16	Feb 2024	M25 Vila Real de Santo, Portugal	World Tennis Tour	Hard	(United States) Hunter Reese	(Portugal) Joao Domingues (Portugal) Jaime Faria	6–7^{(2–7)}, 6–7^{(2–7)}
Win	27–16	Mar 2024	Kigali, Rwanda	Challenger	Clay	(United States) Hunter Reese	(India) S D Prajwal Dev (Austria) David Pichler	6–1, 7–5
Win	28–16	Mar 2024	Yucatán, Mexico	Challenger	Clay	(United States) Hunter Reese	(United States) Boris Kozlov (United States) Stefan Kozlov	7–5, 6–3
Loss	28–17	July 2024	Tampere, Finland	Challenger	Clay	(Denmark) Johannes Ingildsen	(Spain) Íñigo Cervantes Martinavarro (Spain) Daniel Rincón	3–6, 4–6
Loss	28–18	Oct 2024	Hangzhou, China	Challenger	Hard	(Japan) Yuta Shimizu	(China) Sun Fajing (China) Te Rigele	6–3, 7–5
Win	29–18	Oct 2024	Playford, Australia	Challenger	Hard	(Australia) Blake Ellis	(Australia) Jake Delaney (Australia) Jesse Delaney	6–1, 5–7, [10–5]
Win	30–18	Oct 2024	Sydney, Australia	Challenger	Hard	(Australia) Blake Ellis	(Australia) Blake Bayldon (Netherlands) Mats Hermans	7–5, 7–6^{(7–4)}
Win	31–18	Nov 2024	Yokkaichi, Japan	Challenger	Hard	(Switzerland) Jakub Paul	(Japan) Kokoro Isomura (Japan) Hikaru Shiraishi	6–2, 7–5
Win	32–18	Apr 2026	M25 Sharm El Sheikh, Egypt	World Tennis Tour	Hard	(New Zealand) Ajeet Rai	(Slovakia) Lukáš Pokorný (Germany) Niklas Schell	7–6^{(7–3)}, 6–1
Win	33–18	Apr 2026	M25 Quinta do Lago, Portugal	World Tennis Tour	Hard	(New Zealand) Ajeet Rai	(Spain) John Echeverría (Portugal) Tiago Torres	6–3, 7–6^{(7–2)}
Loss	33–19	May 2026	M25 Loulé, Portugal	World Tennis Tour	Hard	(New Zealand) Ajeet Rai	(Canada) Justin Boulais (Portugal) Tiago Pereira	6–7^{(5–7)}, 7–6^{(7–3)}, [4–10]
Win	34–19	May 2026	M25 Bol, Croatia	World Tennis Tour	Clay	(New Zealand) Ajeet Rai	(Croatia) Admir Kalender (Serbia) Matej Sabanov	7–6^{(7–3)}, 6–3
Win	35–19	Jun 2026	M25 Caltanissetta, Italy	World Tennis Tour	Clay	(New Zealand) Ajeet Rai	(Italy) Alessandro Coccioli (Italy) Lorenzo Lorusso	7–6^{(7–4)}, 6–1
Loss	35–20	Jun 2026	Plovdiv, Bulgaria	Challenger	Clay	(New Zealand) Ajeet Rai	(Netherlands) Jarno Jans (Netherlands) Niels Visker	4–6, 5–7
Loss	35–21	Oct 2026	Seoul, South Korea	Challenger	Hard	(Australia) Blake Bayldon	(New Zealand) Finn Reynolds (New Zealand) James Watt	3–6, 6–3, [5–10]
