= Anthony Genov =

Bulgarian tennis player (born 2002)

- Country (sports): Bulgaria
- Born: 2 March 2002 (age 24) Sofia, Bulgaria
- Height: 1.85 m (6 ft 1 in)
- Turned pro: 2019
- Plays: Left-handed (two-handed backhand)
- Prize money: US $53,513

Singles
- Career record: 0–0 (at ATP Tour level, Grand Slam level, and in Davis Cup)
- Career titles: 0
- Highest ranking: No. 1,269 (16 September 2024)

Doubles
- Career record: 0–0 (at ATP Tour level, Grand Slam level, and in Davis Cup)
- Career titles: 1 Challenger, 9 ITF
- Highest ranking: No. 186 (26 October 2026)
- Current ranking: No. 186 (26 October 2026)
- Last updated on: 26 October 2026.

Anthony Genov (Bulgarian: Антъни Генов; born born 2 March 2002) is a Bulgarian professional tennis player. He has a career-high ATP singles ranking of world No. 1,269 achieved on 16 September 2024 and a career-high ATP doubles ranking of No. 186 achieved on 26 October 2026. He is currently the No. 2 ATP player from Bulgaria in the doubles rankings.

== Career ==
He won his debut ATP Challenger title at the 2026 Zagreb Open. Anthony has also won 9 ITF doubles titles.

== Year-end ATP Ranking ==
Year	2021	2022	2023	2024	2025
Singles	2118	1623	1629	1354	2088
Doubles	1807	875	643	304	240

== ATP Challenger and ITF Tour Finals ==
=== Doubles: 25 (10–15) ===
Legend (doubles) ATP Challenger Tour (1–5) ITF World Tennis Tour (9–10)	Titles by surface Hard (2–6) Clay (8–8) Carpet (0–1)

Result	W–L	Date	Tournament	Tier	Surface	Partner	Opponents	Score
Win	1–0	Jan 2022	M15 Cairo, Egypt	World Tennis Tour	Clay	(North Macedonia) Tomislav Jotovski	(Chinese Taipei) Ray Ho (Kazakhstan) Grigoriy Lomakin	6–1, 3–6, [10–7]
Loss	1–1	Oct 2022	M15 Sozopol, Bulgaria	World Tennis Tour	Hard	(Bulgaria) Adriano Dzhenev	(Bulgaria) Yanaki Milev (Bulgaria) Petr Nesterov	3–6, 2–6
Win	2–1	Jul 2023	M15 Kamen, Germany	World Tennis Tour	Clay	Svyatoslav Gulin	(Ukraine) Illya Beloborodko (Georgia (country)) Aleksandre Metreveli	w/o
Loss	2–2	Sep 2023	M15 Melilla, Spain	World Tennis Tour	Clay	(Switzerland) Noah Lopez	(Spain) Jorge Martínez Martínez (Spain) Benjamín Winter López	1–6, 4–6
Loss	2–3	Nov 2023	M25 Benicarló, Spain	World Tennis Tour	Clay	(Spain) Iker Urribarrens Ramírez	(France) Kenny de Schepper (Lithuania) Vilius Gaubas	6–7^{(2–7)}, 6–3, [8–10]
Win	3–3	Dec 2023	M25 Heraklion, Greece	World Tennis Tour	Hard	(Bulgaria) Nikolay Nedelchev	(Greece) Dimitris Sakellaridis (Greece) Michalis Sakellaridis	6–2, 6–1
Loss	3–4	Feb 2024	M25 Antalya, Turkey	World Tennis Tour	Clay	(Ukraine) Nikita Mashtakov	(Turkey) Gökberk Sarıtaş (Turkey) Mert Naci Türker	6–4, 3–6, [7–10]
Win	4–4	Mar 2024	M15 Antalya, Turkey	World Tennis Tour	Clay	Svyatoslav Gulin	(Czech Republic) Dominik Kellovský (Romania) Bogdan Pavel	6–3, 7–6^{(7–4)}
Win	5–4	Mar 2024	M15 Antalya, Turkey	World Tennis Tour	Clay	(United States) Felix Corwin	(Italy) Andrea Gola (Italy) Giuseppe La Vela	6–2, 6–2
Win	6–4	Apr 2024	M25 Reus, Spain	World Tennis Tour	Clay	(Spain) Bruno Pujol Navarro	(Switzerland) Rémy Bertola (Italy) Augusto Virgili	3–6, 6–3, [10–8]
Loss	6–5	May 2024	M25 Mataró, Spain	World Tennis Tour	Clay	(Spain) Bruno Pujol Navarro	(Italy) Giorgio Ricca (Italy) Augusto Virgili	3–6, 4–6
Loss	6–6	Aug 2024	M15 Monastir, Tunisia	World Tennis Tour	Hard	(Portugal) Valentin de Carvalho	(Argentina) Nikos Lehmann; Danil Panarin	6–7^{(6–8)}, 4–6
Win	7–6	Aug 2024	M15 Sofia, Bulgaria	World Tennis Tour	Clay	(Bulgaria) Nikolay Nedelchev	(France) Arthur Géa (Ukraine) Vladyslav Orlov	6–2, 6–7^{(3–7)}, [10–7]
Loss	7–7	Jan 2025	M25 Hazebrouck, France	World Tennis Tour	Hard (i)	(Poland) Szymon Kielan	(France) Dan Added (France) Arthur Bouquier	1–6, 0–6
Loss	7–8	Jan 2025	M25 Nußloch, Germany	World Tennis Tour	Carpet (i)	(Poland) Szymon Kielan	(Sweden) Erik Grevelius (Sweden) Adam Heinonen	6–7^{(3–7)}, 3–6
Loss	7–9	Jul 2025	Pozoblanco, Spain	Challenger	Hard	(Israel) Roy Stepanov	(Spain) Iñaki Montes de la Torre (China) Sun Fajing	1–6, 6–7^{(8–10)}
Win	8–9	Sep 2025	M15 Budapest, Hungary	World Tennis Tour	Hard	(United States) Enzo Wallart	(Hungary) Matyas Fuele (Venezuela) Brandon Pérez	7–5, 4–6, [10–5]
Loss	8–10	Feb 2026	M25 Monastir, Tunisia	World Tennis Tour	Hard	(United Kingdom) Ewen Lumsden	(Poland) Tomasz Berkieta (United States) Christopher Papa	6–7^{(5–7)}, 5–7
Loss	8–11	Mar 2026	Hersonissos, Greece	Challenger	Hard	(United Kingdom) Finn Bass	(Italy) Jacopo Berrettini (Belgium) Kimmer Coppejans	6–3, 1–6, [3–10]
Loss	8–12	Apr 2026	M25 Santa Margherita di Pula, Italy	World Tennis Tour	Clay	(United Kingdom) Finn Bass	(Italy) Jacopo Bilardo (Germany) Kai Wehnelt	6–7^{(5–7)}, 4–6
Win	9–12	Apr 2026	M25 Angers, France	World Tennis Tour	Clay	(United Kingdom) Finn Bass	(France) Marko Maric (Serbia) Tadija Radovanović	6–4, 6–2
Win	10–12	May 2026	Zagreb, Croatia	Challenger	Clay	(United Kingdom) Finn Bass	(United States) George Goldhoff (Denmark) Johannes Ingildsen	4–6, 6–3, [10–8]
Loss	10–13	Jul 2026	Troyes, France	Challenger	Clay	(Germany) Kai Wehnelt	(Netherlands) Mats Hermans (Brazil) Igor Marcondes	3–6, 6–3, [7–10]
Loss	10–14	Jul 2026	Cordenons, Italy	Challenger	Clay	(Republic of Ireland) Charles Barry	(Romania) Alexandru Jecan (Czech Republic) David Poljak	6–4, 6–7^{(4–7)}, [3–10]
Loss	10–15	Sep 2026	Plovdiv, Bulgaria	Challenger	Clay	(Ukraine) Oleksandr Ovcharenko	(Argentina) Valerio Aboian (Argentina) Juan Manuel La Serna	6–4, 5–7, [8–10]
