= Iñaki Montes de la Torre =

Spanish tennis player (born 2002)

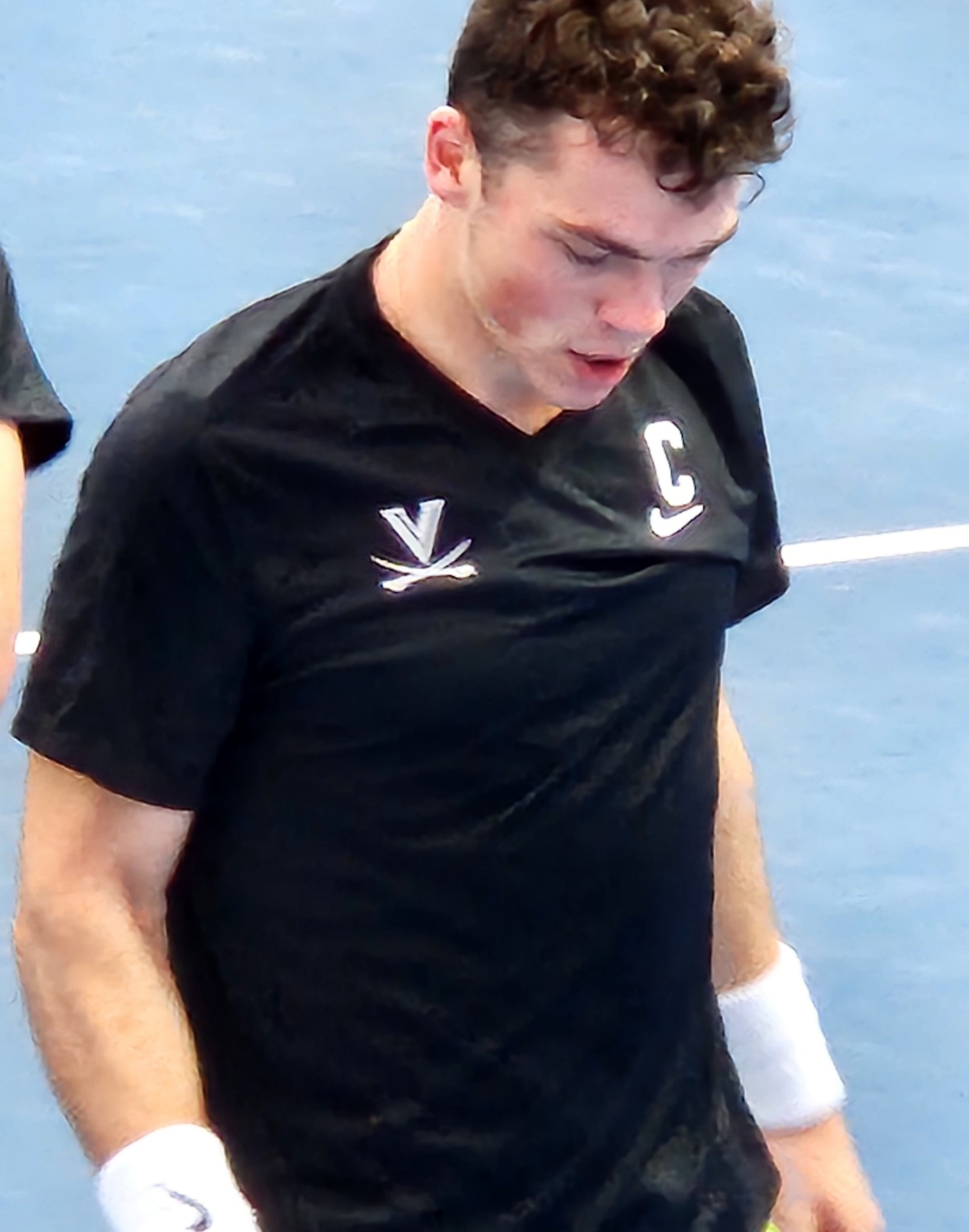
- Mondes de la Torre with the Virginia Cavaliers in 2024
- Country (sports): Spain
- Born: 3 October 2002 (age 24) Pamplona, Spain
- Height: 1.78 m (5 ft 10 in)
- Plays: Right-handed (two-handed backhand)
- College: Virginia
- Prize money: US $150,455

Singles
- Career record: 0–0
- Career titles: 1 Challenger, 6 Futures
- Highest ranking: No. 175 (5 October 2026)
- Current ranking: No. 175 (5 October 2026)

Doubles
- Career record: 0–0
- Career titles: 1 Challenger, 8 Futures
- Highest ranking: No. 219 (20 October 2025)
- Current ranking: No. 501 (5 October 2026)
- Last updated on: 6 October 2026.

Iñaki Montes de la Torre (born 3 October 2002) is a Spanish tennis player. Montes de la Torre has a career high ATP singles ranking of world No. 175 achieved on 5 October 2026 and a career high doubles ranking of No. 219 achieved on 20 October 2025.

Montes de la Torre played college tennis at the University of Virginia.

== Career ==
Montes de la Torre won the ATP Challenger doubles title at the 2022 Open Castilla y León with Nicolás Álvarez Varona. In June 2026, he won his first Challenger singles title in Plovdiv, defeating Sandro Kopp in the final.

== ATP Challenger and ITF World Tennis Tour finals ==
=== Singles: 12 (7 titles, 5 runner-ups) ===
Legend ATP Challenger (1–2) ITF World Tennis Tour (6–3)	Finals by surface Hard (1–3) Clay (6–2)

Result	W–L	Date	Tournament	Tier	Surface	Opponent	Score
Loss	0–1	Aug 2021	M15 Játiva, Spain	World Tennis Tour	Clay	(Italy) Francesco Passaro	6–2, 1–6, 4–6
Win	1–1	Jun 2022	M25 Munguía, Spain	World Tennis Tour	Clay (i)	(Australia) Akira Santillan	6–3, 7–5
Win	2–1	Jul 2023	M15 Bergamo, Italy	World Tennis Tour	Clay	(Argentina) Mariano Kestelboim	6–3, 4–6, 7–5
Loss	2–2	Jul 2023	M25 Guecho, Spain	World Tennis Tour	Clay	(Spain) Javier Barranco Cosano	6–7^{(2–7)}, 4–6
Win	3–2	Oct 2024	M15 Monastir, Tunisia	World Tennis Tour	Hard	(Turkey) Altug Celikbilek	6–2, 1–6, 6–4
Win	4–2	Jun 2025	M15 Mungia-Laukariz, Spain	World Tennis Tour	Clay	(Poland) Marcel Zielinski	6–4, 6–4
Win	5–2	Mar 2026	M25 Badalona, Spain	World Tennis Tour	Clay	(Italy) Jacopo Vasamì	6–4, 6–2
Win	6–2	Apr 2026	M25 Angers, France	World Tennis Tour	Clay	(Spain) Oriol Roca Batalla	6–2, 6–4
Win	7–2	Jun 2026	Plovdiv, Bulgaria	Challenger	Clay	(Austria) Sandro Kopp	7–6^{(7–5)}, 3–6, 7–6^{(10–8)}
Loss	7–3	Aug 2026	Rafa Nadal Open, Spain	Challenger	Hard	(France) Felix Balshaw	6–3, 2–6, 3–6
Loss	7–4	Sep 2026	M25 Setúbal, Portugal	World Tennis Tour	Hard	(Netherlands) Alec Deckers	7–5, 4–6, 3–6
Loss	7–5	Sep 2026	Porto Open, Portugal	Challenger	Hard	(Portugal) Henrique Rocha	6–2, 4–6, 4–6

=== Doubles ===
Result	Date	Tournament	Category	Surface	Partner	Opponents	Score
Winner	Jul 2022	Segovia, Spain	Challenger	Hard	(Spain) Nicolás Álvarez Varona	(Zimbabwe) Benjamin Lock (Zimbabwe) Courtney John Lock	7–6^{(7–3)}, 6–3
