= Petr Nesterov =

Bulgarian tennis player

- Country (sports): Bulgaria
- Residence: Varna, Bulgaria
- Born: 7 March 2003 (age 23) Moscow, Russia
- Turned pro: 2019
- Plays: Right-handed (two-handed backhand)
- Prize money: US $127,653

Singles
- Career record: 1–2 (at ATP Tour level, Grand Slam level, and in Davis Cup)
- Career titles: 0
- Highest ranking: No. 279 (19 October 2026)
- Current ranking: No. 282 (9 November 2026)

Doubles
- Career record: 5–4 (at ATP Tour level, Grand Slam level, and in Davis Cup)
- Career titles: 0
- Highest ranking: No. 260 (4 November 2024)
- Current ranking: No. 478 (19 October 2026)
- Last updated on: 9 November 2026.

Petr Nesterov (Bulgarian: Пьотр Нестеров, romanized: Pyotr Nesterov, born 7 March 2003) is a Bulgarian tennis player. He has a career-high ATP singles ranking of world No. 279 achieved on 19 October 2026 and a doubles ranking of No. 260 achieved on 4 November 2024. He is currently the No. 2 Bulgarian player. Nesterov reached the final of the 2021 US Open Junior doubles with Ukrainian Viacheslav Bielinskyi.

== Professional career ==
=== 2019–2021: Early years, turning pro, Major Junior final ===
Nesterov made his professional debut at the age of 16, when he received a wildcard for the ITF tournament in Burgas in 2019. Although he lost his first singles match, Petr reached his debut ITF final in doubles with compatriot Simeon Terziev, but the Bulgarian duo couldn't go all the way, losing 3–6, 3–6 to Luca Gelhard and Kai Wehnelt. A year and a half later, after the end of his junior career, Nesterov started playing regularly on the ITF Tour.

As a junior, Nesterov won three singles and four doubles titles and achieved a career-high ranking of World No. 15. His biggest junior success came in 2021 at the US Open, where he reached the quarterfinals in singles and his first Grand Slam final in doubles with Viacheslav Bielinskyi, but lost 3–6, 7–5, [1–10] to Max Westphal and Coleman Wong in the championship match. Earlier in the year the Bulgarian-Ukrainian duo came close to another doubles final at the French Open, but lost out in the semifinals to eventual champions Arthur Fils and Giovanni Mpetshi Perricard.

=== 2022–2024: ATP doubles debut and first wins ===
In 2022 he made his debut for Bulgaria Davis Cup team in the World Group II Play-Off tie with Paraguay, but was forced to retire in the third set against Daniel Vallejo. After reaching two semifinals as a qualifier at the M25 and M15 events in Pirot and Novi Sad, Nesterov made his debut in the top 1000 of the ATP rankings as well as reaching his second doubles final with Simon Anthony Ivanov at the tournament in Novi Sad.

In September, Nesterov made his ATP singles qualifying debut at the 2022 Sofia Open after receiving a wildcard for the qualifying draw of his home tournament. The Bulgarian did not waste this opportunity and scored his biggest win to date, overcoming World No. 270 Salvatore Caruso in straight sets 7–6(4), 6–4. Ultimately he could not seal his spot into the main draw after a loss to Dragoș Nicolae Mădăraș in the second round.

Nesterov made his main draw ATP doubles debut with Yanaki Milev at the 2022 Sofia Open, where they reached the quarterfinals defeating Jack Vance and Jamie Vance before losing to eventual champions Rafael Matos and David Vega Hernández. He also received a wildcard for the 2023 Sofia Open with Yanaki Milev and again reached the quarterfinals defeating Spanish duo of defending champion David Vega Hernández and Íñigo Cervantes.

=== 2025–2026: First ATP Challenger final, top 300 ===
Nesterov reached his first ATP Challenger final at the 2026 Plovdiv Challenger II at home in Bulgaria, but lost in straight sets 6–1, 7–6^{(7–5)} in the final to Gabriele Piraino. As a result, he reached the top 300 in the ATP singles rankings on 24 August 2026.

== Year-end ATP ranking ==
Year	2019	2020	2021	2022	2023	2024	2025
Singles	-	-	1692	819	558	439	587
Doubles	1514	1584	2418	550	423	310	568

== ATP Challenger and ITF finals ==
=== Singles: 13 (9–4) ===
Legend (singles) ATP Challenger Tour (0–1) ITF World Tennis Tour (9–3)	Titles by surface Hard (4–1) Clay (5–3)

Result	W–L	Date	Tournament	Tier	Surface	Opponent	Score
Win	1–0	Oct 2023	M15 Al Zahra, Kuwait	World Tennis Tour	Hard	(Portugal) Gonçalo Oliveira	4–6, 6–4, 6–3
Win	2–0	Nov 2023	M15 Al Zahra, Kuwait	World Tennis Tour	Hard	(Slovakia) Tomáš Lánik	6–4, 7–6^{(7–5)}
Loss	2–1	Mar 2024	M15 Aktobe, Kazakhstan	World Tennis Tour	Hard (i)	Evgeny Karlovskiy	7–6^{(7–1)}, 1–6, 2–6
Win	3–1	May 2024	M15 Bucharest, Romania	World Tennis Tour	Clay	(Netherlands) Niels Lootsma	6–3, 4–6, 7–6^{(8–6)}
Win	4–1	May 2024	M15 Bucharest, Romania	World Tennis Tour	Clay	(Morocco) Elliot Benchetrit	6–1, 6–2
Loss	4–2	Oct 2024	M25 Santa Margherita di Pula, Italy	World Tennis Tour	Clay	(Spain) Pol Martín Tiffon	2–6, 6–7^{(5–7)}
Loss	4–3	May 2025	M15 Bistrița, Romania	World Tennis Tour	Clay	(Romania) Cezar Crețu	3–6, 6–7^{(5–7)}
Win	5–3	May 2025	M15 Bucharest, Romania	World Tennis Tour	Clay	(Romania) Gabi Adrian Boitan	6–4, 6–4
Win	6–3	Dec 2025	M15 Monastir, Tunisia	World Tennis Tour	Hard	(India) Manas Dhamne	6–1, 6–4
Win	7–3	Feb 2026	M15 Monastir, Tunisia	World Tennis Tour	Hard	(Poland) Tomasz Berkieta	6–4, 6–4
Win	8–3	May 2026	M25 Santa Margherita di Pula, Italy	World Tennis Tour	Clay	(France) Arthur Nagel	7–5, 6–0
Win	9–3	Aug 2026	M25 Gentofte, Denmark	World Tennis Tour	Clay	(Denmark) Carl Emil Overbeck	3–6, 6–3, 6–1
Loss	9–4	Aug 2026	Plovdiv, Bulgaria	Challenger	Clay	(Italy) Gabriele Piraino	1–6, 6–7^{(5–7)}

=== Doubles: 22 (9–13) ===
Legend (doubles) ATP Challenger Tour (0–2) ITF World Tennis Tour (9–11)	Titles by surface Hard (3–4) Clay (6–9) Grass (0–0) Carpet (0–0)

Result	W–L	Date	Tournament	Tier	Surface	Partner	Opponents	Score
Loss	0–1	Oct 2019	M15 Burgas, Bulgaria	World Tennis Tour	Clay	(Bulgaria) Simeon Terziev	(Germany) Luca Gelhard (Germany) Kai Wehnelt	3–6, 3–6
Loss	0–2	Jul 2022	M15 Novi Sad, Serbia	World Tennis Tour	Clay	(Bulgaria) Simon Anthony Ivanov	(Serbia) Viktor Jović; Marat Sharipov	3–6, 4–6
Loss	0–3	Oct 2022	M15 Sozopol, Bulgaria	World Tennis Tour	Hard	(Bulgaria) Yanaki Milev	(Poland) Maks Kaśnikowski (Poland) Olaf Pieczkowski	3–6, 5–7
Win	1–3	Oct 2022	M15 Sozopol, Bulgaria	World Tennis Tour	Hard	(Bulgaria) Yanaki Milev	(Bulgaria) Adriano Dhzenev (Bulgaria) Anthony Genov	6–3, 6–2
Win	2–3	Mar 2023	M15 Sharm El Sheikh, Egypt	World Tennis Tour	Hard	(South Africa) Alec Beckley	(Luxembourg) Alex Knaff (Germany) Jakob Schnaitter	3–6, 6–3, [10–8]
Loss	2–4	Jun 2023	M15 Constanța, Romania	World Tennis Tour	Clay	(Poland) Olaf Pieczkowski	(Uruguay) Ignacio Carou (Brazil) João Victor Couto Loureiro	3–6, 6–7^{(5–7)}
Loss	2–5	Jun 2023	M25 Skopje, North Macedonia	World Tennis Tour	Clay	(Bulgaria) Yanaki Milev	(France) Sascha Gueymard Wayenburg (France) Antoine Hoang	1–6, 2–6
Loss	2–6	Dec 2023	M15 Zahra, Kuwait	World Tennis Tour	Hard	(Georgia (country)) Aleksandre Bakshi	(Netherlands) Dax Donders (Netherlands) Sidané Pontjodikromo	6–3, 6–7^{(3–7)}, [8–10]
Loss	2–7	Dec 2023	M15 Antalya, Turkey	World Tennis Tour	Clay	Bogdan Bobrov	(United Kingdom) Jay Clarke (United Kingdom) James MacKinlay	1–6, 2–6
Win	3–7	May 2024	M15 Bucharest, Romania	World Tennis Tour	Clay	(Moldova) Ilya Snițari	(Argentina) Tomás Lipovšek Puches (Argentina) Juan Bautista Otegui	6–7^{(5–7)}, 6–4, [10–7]
Win	4–7	May 2024	M15 Bucharest, Romania	World Tennis Tour	Clay	(Moldova) Ilya Snițari	(Italy) Simone Agostini (Italy) Matteo De Vincentis	7–6^{(7–4)}, 6–2
Win	5–7	Jun 2024	M25 Satu Mare, Romania	World Tennis Tour	Clay	(Ukraine) Vladyslav Orlov	(Slovakia) Miloš Karol (United Kingdom) Michael Shaw	6–4, 6–2
Loss	5–8	Jul 2024	Verona, Italy	Challenger	Clay	(Bulgaria) Yanaki Milev	(Brazil) Marcelo Demoliner (Argentina) Guillermo Durán	7–6^{(8–6)}, 6–7^{(3–7)}, [13–15]
Loss	5–9	Sep 2024	M25 Satu Mare, Romania	World Tennis Tour	Clay	(Ukraine) Vladyslav Orlov	(Germany) Tim Rühl (Germany) Louis Wessels	6–7^{(6–8)}, 3–6
Win	6–9	Oct 2024	M25 Santa Margherita di Pula, Italy	World Tennis Tour	Clay	(Bulgaria) Yanaki Milev	(Italy) Alessandro Spadola (Italy) Matteo Vavassori	7–6^{(7–4)}, 6–3
Win	7–9	Oct 2024	M25 Santa Margherita di Pula, Italy	World Tennis Tour	Clay	(Bulgaria) Yanaki Milev	(Italy) Massimo Giunta (Italy) Mariano Tammaro	6–3, 6–3
Loss	7–10	Nov 2024	M15 Antalya, Turkey	World Tennis Tour	Clay	(Bulgaria) Yanaki Milev	(Germany) Tim Handel (Serbia) Stefan Popović	3–6, 2–6
Loss	7–11	Jan 2025	M15 Doha, Qatar	World Tennis Tour	Hard	(Bulgaria) Yanaki Milev	(Romania) Gabi Adrian Boitan (Romania) Bogdan Pavel	1–6, 2–6
Win	8–11	Jun 2025	M25 Klosters, Switzerland	World Tennis Tour	Clay	(Switzerland) Timofey Stepanov	(France) Corentin Denolly (Austria) Maximilian Neuchrist	7–6^{(7–4)}, 6–4
Loss	8–12	Jul 2025	M25+H Kassel, Germany	World Tennis Tour	Hard	(Ukraine) Oleksandr Ovcharenko	(France) Max Westphal (United States) Theodore Winegar	6–7^{(2–7)}, 3–6
Win	9–11	Dec 2025	M15 Monastir, Tunisia	World Tennis Tour	Hard	(Tunisia) Adam Nagoudi	(Italy) Stefano Papagno (Italy) Felipe Virgili Berini	7–5, 6–7^{(4–7)}, [11–9]
Loss	9–12	Mar 2026	Hersonissos, Greece	Challenger	Hard	(Ukraine) Oleksandr Ovcharenko	(Belgium) Michael Geerts (Portugal) Tiago Pereira	6–3, 4–6, [5–10]

== National participation ==
=== Davis Cup (3 wins, 6 losses) ===
Petr Nesterov debuted for the Bulgaria Davis Cup team in 2022. Since then he has 9 nominations with 7 ties played, his singles W/L record is 1–3 and doubles W/L record is 2–3 (3–6 overall).

Group membership Finals (0–0) Qualifying round (0–1) Group I (3–2) Group II (0–3) Group III (0–0) Group IV (0–0)	Matches by surface Hard (2–3) Clay (1–3) Grass (0–0) Carpet (0–0)	Matches by type Singles (1–3) Doubles (2–3)

- ▲ ▼ indicates the result of the Davis Cup match followed by the score, date, place of event, the zonal classification and its phase, and the court surface.

Rubber result	No.	Rubber	Match type (partner if any)	Opponent nation	Opponent player(s)	Score
▲3–1; 4–5 March 2022; Sport Hall Sofia, Sofia, Bulgaria; World Group II Play-Off; Hard (i) surface
Defeat	1	IV	Singles	Paraguay	Daniel Vallejo	6–7^{(8–10)}, 7–6^{(7–2)}, [5–10]
▲3–1; 4–5 February 2023; Wilding Park, Christchurch, New Zealand; World Group I Play-Off; Hard surface
Defeat	2	III	Doubles (with Alexander Donski)	New Zealand	Artem Sitak / Michael Venus	4–6, 6–3, 3–6
▼1–3; 3–4 February 2024; Tennis Center Avenue, Burgas, Bulgaria; World Group I Play-Off; Hard (i) surface
Victory	3	IV	Singles	Bosnia and Herzegovina	Andrej Nedić	4–6, 6–2, [10–8]
▲3–2; 14–16 September 2024; Tennis Club Lokomotiv, Plovdiv, Bulgaria; World Group II; Clay surface
Defeat	4	I	Singles	El Salvador	Marcelo Arévalo	3–6, 3–6
Defeat	5	III	Doubles (with Alexander Donski)	El Salvador	Marcelo Arévalo / César Cruz	7–5, 6–7^{(4–7)}, 3–6
▲3–1; 31 January–1 February 2025; Polyvalent Hall, Craiova, Romania; World Group I Play-Off; Hard (i) surface
Defeat	6	I	Singles	Romania	Cezar Crețu	7–6^{(8–6)}, 3–6, 6–7^{(3–7)}
Victory	7	III	Doubles (with Alexander Donski)	Romania	Gabi Adrian Boitan / Victor Vlad Cornea	6–3, 6–3
▲3–2; 13–14 September 2025; Tennis Club Lokomotiv, Plovdiv, Bulgaria; World Group I; Clay surface
Victory	8	III	Doubles (with Alexander Donski)	Finland	Harri Heliövaara / Otto Virtanen	6–4, 1–6, 7–6^{(7–1)}
▼0–4; 7–8 February 2026; Kolodruma, Plovdiv, Bulgaria; Qualifiers first round; Clay (i) surface
Defeat	9	III	Doubles (with Alexander Donski)	Belgium	Sander Gillé / Joran Vliegen	6–7^{(5–7)}, 6–7^{(3–7)}

== Junior Grand Slam finals ==
=== Doubles: 1 (0–1) ===
Result	Year	Tournament	Surface	Partner	Opponent	Score
Runner-Up	2021	US Open	Hard	(Ukraine) Viacheslav Bielinskyi	(France) Max Westphal (Hong Kong) Coleman Wong	3–6, 7–5, [1–10]
