= Sandro Kopp (tennis) =

Austrian tennis player (born 2000)

- Country (sports): Austria
- Born: 26 May 2000 (age 26) Schwaz, Austria
- Height: 1.85 m (6 ft 1 in)
- Plays: Right-handed (two-handed backhand)
- Coach: Hakan Dahlbo
- Prize money: US $200,794

Singles
- Career record: 0–0 (at ATP Tour level, Grand Slam level, and in Davis Cup)
- Career titles: 0
- Highest ranking: No. 280 (10 August 2026)
- Current ranking: No. 293 (26 October 2026)

Doubles
- Career record: 0–0 (at ATP Tour level, Grand Slam level, and in Davis Cup)
- Career titles: 0
- Highest ranking: No. 352 (12 June 2023)
- Current ranking: No. 457 (10 August 2026)
- Last updated on: 30 October 2026.

Sandro Kopp (born 26 May 2000) is an Austrian tennis player. He has a career high ATP singles ranking of world No. 280 achieved on 10 August 2026 and a doubles ranking of No. 352 achieved on 12 June 2023.

== Career ==
=== 2019–2025: First ITF title ===
In July 2019, Kopp made his first appearance in an ITF World Tennis Tour final in Kramsach, losing to Russian Ronald Slobodchikov in straight sets. He entered the singles qualifying draw as a wildcard at the 2019 Generali Open Kitzbühel and defeated seeded player Viktor Galović in the first round.

He was entered in the qualifying draw of the 2020 Generali Open Kitzbühel as a wildcard but lost in the first round. He won his first title on the ITF Tour in 2022 and won six more that year.

In July 2024, he entered the qualifying draw of the 2024 Generali Open Kitzbühel as a wildcard. He defeated top seed Albert Ramos Viñolas, but lost out on a qualifying spot to Argentine Andrea Collarini after retiring from the match in the second set.

He also entered the qualifying draw of the 2025 Generali Open Kitzbühel as a wildcard, but lost to seeded Austrian Jurij Rodionov in straight sets.

=== 2026: ATP Challenger final, ATP doubles debut ===
He reached his first final on the ATP Challenger Tour in the 2026 Plovdiv Challenger, losing to Iñaki Montes de la Torre. He received a main draw wildcard for the 2026 Generali Open Kitzbühel doubles event partnering compatriot Nico Hipfl, marking his ATP Tour doubles debut. He was also granted a wildcard into the singles qualifying draw, where he defeated seeded player Pierre-Hugues Herbert in the first round, before losing to Kilian Feldbausch in the final round of the qualifying competition.

== Personal life ==
He is a fan of the German football club FC Bayern Munich and has an older sister, also a tennis player.

== ATP Challenger and ITF World Tennis Tour finals ==
=== Singles: 19 (9–10) ===
Legend ATP Challenger Tour (0–1) ITF World Tennis Tour (9–9)	Finals by surface Hard (2–1) Clay (7–9) Grass (0–0) Carpet (0–0)

Result	W–L	Date	Tournament	Tier	Surface	Opponent	Score
Loss	0–1	Jul 2019	M15 Kramsach, Austria	WTT	Clay	(Russia) Ronald Slobodchikov	2–6, 0–6
Win	1–1	Jul 2022	M15 Innsbruck, Austria	WTT	Clay	(Netherlands) Max Houkes	5–7, 6–1, 6–2
Loss	1–2	Aug 2022	M15 Malmö, Sweden	WTT	Clay	(Germany) Nino Ehrenschneider	3–6, 6–7^{(1–7)}
Win	2–2	Nov 2022	M15 Sëlva, Italy	WTT	Hard (i)	(Germany) Leopold Zima	6–3, 7–6^{(8–6)}
Loss	2–3	Jul 2023	M25 Arlon, Belgium	WTT	Clay	(Belgium) Tibo Colson	2–6, 2–6
Win	3–3	Jul 2023	M25 Telfs, Austria	WTT	Clay	(Belgium) Buvaysar Gadamauri	6–2, 6–1
Loss	3–4	Feb 2024	M25 Hammamet, Tunisia	WTT	Clay	(United Kingdom) Jay Clarke	6–4, 2–6, 3–6
Win	4–4	Mar 2024	M15 Poreč, Croatia	WTT	Clay	(France) Luka Pavlovic	6–3, 6–2
Loss	4–5	Apr 2024	M25 Hammamet, Tunisia	WTT	Clay	(Tunisia) Aziz Dougaz	6–7^{(6–8)}, 2–6
Win	5–5	Jun 2024	M25 Duffel, Belgium	WTT	Clay	(Uzbekistan) Khumoyun Sultanov	6–4, 6–3
Loss	5–6	Feb 2025	M25 Vila Real de Santo António, Portugal	WTT	Hard	(Portugal) Frederico Ferreira Silva	6–4, 1–6, 6–7^{(12–14)}
Loss	5–7	Mar 2025	M15 Poreč, Croatia	WTT	Clay	(Bosnia and Herzegovina) Nerman Fatić	2–6, 1–6
Win	6–7	Jun 2025	M25 Klosters, Switzerland	WTT	Clay	(Austria) Joel Schwärzler	0–6, 6–4, 6–4
Win	7–7	Aug 2025	M15 Mistelbach, Austria	WTT	Clay	(Poland) Marcel Zieliński	6–2, 6–3
Win	8–7	Nov 2025	M15 Selva Gardena, Italy	WTT	Hard	(Italy) Filippo Romano	6–4, 7–6^{(7–4)}
Loss	8–8	Jun 2026	M25 Värnamo, Sweden	WTT	Clay	(Germany) Niels McDonald	6–7^{(5–7)}, 4–6
Loss	8–9	Jun 2026	Plovdiv, Bulgaria	Challenger	Clay	(Spain) Iñaki Montes de la Torre	6–7^{(5–7)}, 6–3, 6–7^{(8–10)}
Win	9–9	Jun 2026	M25 Klosters, Switzerland	WTT	Clay	(Switzerland) Dylan Dietrich	7–6^{(7–1)}, 7–6^{(7–4)}
Loss	9–10	Jul 2026	M25 Bolzano, Italy	WTT	Clay	(Austria) Sebastian Sorger	7–6(8–6), 6–3

=== Doubles 12 (11–1) ===
Legend ATP Challenger Tour (0–0) ITF World Tennis Tour (11–1)	Finals by surface Hard (2–0) Clay (9–1) Grass (0–0) Carpet (0–0)

Result	W–L	Date	Tournament	Tier	Surface	Partner	Opponents	Score
Win	1–0	May 2022	M15 Warmbad Villach, Austria	WTT	Clay	(Germany) Kai Lemstra	(Georgia (country)) Aleksandre Bakshi (Italy) Giovanni Oradini	7–6^{(7–1)}, 7–6^{(7–3)}
Win	2—0	Jul 2022	M25 Telfs, Austria	WTT	Clay	(Netherlands) Mick Veldheer	(Czech Republic) Ondrej Horak (Czech Republic) Daniel Siniakov	6–4, 6–3
Win	3–0	Jul 2022	M15 Innsbruck, Austria	WTT	Clay	(Austria) Neil Oberleitner	(Czech Republic) Adam Jurajda (Slovakia) Miloš Karol	6–2, 6–2
Win	4–0	Aug 2022	M25 Ystad, Sweden	WTT	Clay	(Netherlands) Mick Veldheer	(Australia) Ethan Cook (Bulgaria) Leonid Sheyngezikht	6–4, 6–2
Win	5–0	Nov 2022	M25 Heraklion, Greece	WTT	Hard	(Austria) Neil Oberleitner	(Bulgaria) Alexander Donski (Germany) Tim Sandkaulen	6–7^{(2–7)}, 6–3, [10–7]
Win	6–0	May 2023	M15 Warmbad Villach, Austria	WTT	Clay	(Germany) Kai Lemstra	(Peru) Alexander Merino (Germany) Christoph Negritu	7–6^{(7–2)}, 6–4
Loss	6—1	Jul 2023	M25 Telfs, Austria	WTT	Clay	(Slovakia) Milos Karol	(Germany) Jakob Schnaitter (Germany) Mark Wallner	4–6, 7–6^{(9–7)}, [5–10]
Win	7–1	Sep 2023	M25 Pazardzhik, Bulgaria	WTT	Clay	(Austria) Neil Oberleitner	(Netherlands) Max Houkes (Ukraine) Eric Vanshelboim	6–0, 6–0
Win	8–1	Feb 2024	M25 Hammamet, Tunisia	WTT	Clay	(United Kingdom) Jay Clarke	(France) Corentin Denolly (Switzerland) Damien Wenger	6–2, 7–5
Win	9–1	Jun 2024	M25 Duffel, Belgium	WTT	Clay	(Germany) Kai Wehnelt	(Germany) Marcel Hornung (United States) Lucas Hammond	6–3, 6–3
Win	10–1	Jan 2025	M25 Esch-sur-Alzette, Luxembourg	WTT	Hard (i)	(Czech Republic) Michael Vrbenský	(Bulgaria) Alexander Donski (Spain) Bruno Pujol Navarro	3–6, 7–6^{(7–2)}, [10–3]
Win	11–1	Mar 2025	M25 Tarragona, Spain	WTT	Clay	(Germany) Rudolf Molleker	(Belgium) Michael Geerts (Germany) Daniel Masur	7–5, 4–6, [10–8]
