= João Victor Couto Loureiro =

Brazilian tennis player (born 2003)

- Country (sports): Brazil
- Born: 28 March 2003 (age 23) Belo Horizonte, Brazil
- Height: 1.85 m (6 ft 1 in)
- Plays: Right-handed (two-handed backhand)
- Coach: Diogo Cruz
- Prize money: US $57,001

Singles
- Career record: 0–0 (at ATP Tour level, Grand Slam level, and in Davis Cup)
- Career titles: 0
- Highest ranking: No. 788 (19 December 2022)
- Current ranking: No. 831 (9 November 2026)

Doubles
- Career record: 0–0 (at ATP Tour level, Grand Slam level, and in Davis Cup)
- Career titles: 1 Challenger, 9 ITF
- Highest ranking: No. 250 (9 November 2026)
- Current ranking: No. 250 (9 November 2026)
- Last updated on: 9 November 2026.

João Victor Couto Loureiro (born 28 March 2003) is a Brazilian tennis player. Loureiro has a career high ATP singles ranking of No. 788 achieved on 19 December 2022 and a career high ATP doubles ranking of No. 250 achieved on 9 November 2026.

Loureiro has won one ATP Challenger doubles title at the 2026 Plovdiv Challenger II.
