= Valerio Aboian =

Argentine tennis player

- Full name: Valerio Miguel Ángel Aboian
- Country (sports): Argentina
- Born: 14 June 2002 (age 24) Buenos Aires, Argentina
- Height: 1.83 m (6 ft 0 in)
- Plays: Left-handed (two-handed backhand)
- Coach: Fabián Blengino
- Prize money: US $177,380

Singles
- Career record: 0–0
- Career titles: 4 ITF World Tennis Tour
- Highest ranking: No. 258 (2 November 2026)
- Current ranking: No. 258 (2 November 2026)

Doubles
- Career record: 0–0
- Career titles: 1 ATP Challenger, 8 ITF World Tennis Tour
- Highest ranking: No. 242 (31 March 2025)
- Current ranking: No. 346 (2 November 2026)
- Last updated on: 2 November 2026.

Valerio Miguel Ángel Aboian (born 14 June 2002) is an Argentine tennis player of Armenian origin. Aboian has a career high ATP singles ranking of No. 258 achieved on 2 November 2026 and a career high doubles ranking of No. 242 achieved on 31 March 2025.

Aboian has won 1 ATP Challenger doubles title at the 2023 Challenger Coquimbo with Murkel Dellien.

== ATP Challenger Tour finals ==
=== Singles: 1 (1 runner-up) ===
Legend ATP Challenger Tour (0–1)	Finals by surface Hard (–) Clay (0–1)

Result	W–L	Date	Tournament	Tier	Surface	Opponent	Score
Loss	0–1	Oct 2026	Cali Open, Colombia	Challenger	Clay	(Brazil) Matheus Pucinelli de Almeida	6–7^{(1–7)}, 3–6

=== Doubles: 9 (3 titles, 6 runner-ups) ===
Legend ATP Challenger Tour (3–6)

Result	W–L	Date	Tournament	Tier	Surface	Partner	Opponents	Score
Win	1–0	May 2023	Coquimbo, Chile	Challenger	Clay	(Bolivia) Murkel Dellien	(Argentina) Tomás Farjat (Italy) Facundo Juárez	7–6^{(7–4)}, 6–0
Loss	1–1	Jun 2024	Ibagué Open, Colombia	Challenger	Clay	(Argentina) Leonardo Aboian	(New Zealand) Finn Reynolds (Chile) Matías Soto	4–6, 6–4, [7–10]
Loss	1–2	Sep 2024	Antofagasta Challenger, Chile	Challenger	Clay	(Argentina) Leonardo Aboian	(Brazil) Mateus Alves (Chile) Matías Soto	1–6, 4–6
Win	2–2	Aug 2026	Plovdiv Challenger III, Bulgaria	Challenger	Clay	(Argentina) Juan Manuel La Serna	(Bulgaria) Anthony Genov (Ukraine) Oleksandr Ovcharenko	4–6, 7–5, [10–8]
