= Nikita Mashtakov =

Ukrainian tennis player

Nikita Mashtakov Нікіта Маштаков
- Full name: Nikita Marselovych Mashtakov
- Country (sports): Ukraine
- Born: 18 March 1999 (age 27) Donetsk, Ukraine
- Height: 1.78 m (5 ft 10 in)
- Plays: Right-handed (two-handed backhand)
- Coach: Bruno Urisk
- Prize money: US $78,148

Singles
- Career record: 0–1 (at ATP Tour level, Grand Slam level, and in Davis Cup)
- Career titles: 1 ITF
- Highest ranking: No. 432 (16 November 2026)
- Current ranking: No. 432 (16 November 2026)

Grand Slam singles results
- French Open Junior: 1R (2017)
- US Open Junior: Q2 (2016)

Doubles
- Career record: 0–0 (at ATP Tour level, Grand Slam level, and in Davis Cup)
- Career titles: 3 ITF
- Highest ranking: No. 438 (20 October 2025)
- Current ranking: No. 662 (16 November 2026)

Grand Slam doubles results
- French Open Junior: 1R (2017)

Team competitions
- Davis Cup: 0–1
- Last updated on: 16 November 2026.

Nikita Marselovych Mashtakov (Ukrainian: Нікіта Марсельович Маштаков; born 18 March 1999) is a Ukrainian tennis player. He has a career high ATP singles ranking of world No. 432 achieved on 16 November 2026 and a doubles ranking of No. 438 achieved on 20 October 2025.

On the junior tour, Mashtakov has a career high ranking of No. 24, achieved on 23 January 2017.

Mashtakov has represented Ukraine in the Davis Cup, where he has a win–loss record of 0–1.

== ATP Challenger and ITF Tour Finals ==
=== Singles: 7 (4–3) ===
Legend (singles) ATP Challenger Tour (0–0) ITF World Tennis Tour (4–3)	Titles by surface Hard (0–1) Clay (4–2) Grass (0–0) Carpet (0–0)

Result	W–L	Date	Tournament	Tier	Surface	Opponent	Score
Win	1–0	Jun 2019	M15 Telavi, Georgia	World Tennis Tour	Clay	(United States) Dennis Uspensky	6–3, 6-4
Loss	1–1	Aug 2019	M15 Irpin, Ukraine	World Tennis Tour	Clay	(Ukraine) Vladyslav Orlov	3–6, 1-6
Loss	1–2	Jul 2024	M15 Łódź, Poland	World Tennis Tour	Clay	(Poland) Maciej Rajski	2–6, 6–7^{(3–7)}
Loss	1–3	Apr 2026	M15 Heraklion, Greece	World Tennis Tour	Hard	(Cyprus) Menelaos Efstathiou	6–2, 3–6, 2–6
Win	2–3	Jun 2026	M25 Samobor, Croatia	World Tennis Tour	Clay	(Bosnia and Herzegovina) Andrej Nedić	7–5, 6–7^{(5–7)}, 6–1
Win	3–3	Aug 2026	M15 Mistelbach, Austria	World Tennis Tour	Clay	(Austria) Thilo Behrmann	2–6, 6–3, 6–4
Win	4–3	Oct 2026	M15 Šibenik, Croatia	World Tennis Tour	Clay	(Switzerland) Noah Lopez	6–0, 6–4

=== Doubles: 7 (3–4) ===
Legend ATP Challenger Tour (0–0) ITF Futures/World Tennis Tour (3–4)	Finals by surface Hard (0–2) Clay (3–2) Grass (0–0)

Result	W–L	Date	Tournament	Tier	Surface	Partner	Opponents	Score
Loss	0–1	Sep 2019	Egypt F29, Sharm El Sheikh	Futures	Hard	(Belarus) Aliaksandr Liaonenka	(Republic of Ireland) Peter Bothwell (Spain) David Pérez Sanz	0–6, 3–6
Loss	0–2	Sep 2019	M15 Chornomorsk, Ukraine	World Tennis Tour	Clay	(Ukraine) Dmytro Kamynin	(Hungary) Mátyás Füle (Hungary) Gergely Madarász	6–4, 2–6, [11–13]
Win	1–2	May 2021	M15 Novomoskovsk, Ukraine	World Tennis Tour	Clay	(Ukraine) Danylo Kalenichenko	(Spain) Carlos Sánchez Jover (Spain) José Francisco Vidal Azorín	5–7, 6–4, [10–8]
Loss	1–3	Feb 2024	M25 Antalya, Turkey	World Tennis Tour	Clay	(Bulgaria) Anthony Genov	(Turkey) Gökberk Sarıtaş (Turkey) Mert Naci Türker	6–4, 3–6, [7–10]
Win	2–3	May 2024	M15 Bol, Croatia	World Tennis Tour	Clay	(Bosnia and Herzegovina) Mirza Bašić	(Ukraine) Igor Dudun (Ukraine) Ivan Kremenchutskyi	7–5, 6–2
Win	3–3	Jun 2024	M15 Wrocław, Poland	World Tennis Tour	Clay	(Latvia) Robert Strombachs	(Poland) Szymon Walków (Poland) Kacper Żuk	7–6^{(7–5)}, 7–5
Loss	3–4	Nov 2024	M15 Szabolcsveresmart, Hungary	World Tennis Tour	Hard	(France) Matt Ponchet	(Ukraine) Illya Beloborodko (Czech Republic) Jan Jermar	3–6, 4–6
