= Gabriele Piraino =

Italian tennis player (born 2003)

- Country (sports): Italy
- Born: 12 November 2003 (age 22) Palermo, Italy
- Height: 1.88 m (6 ft 2 in)
- Plays: Left-handed
- Prize money: US $135,040

Singles
- Career record: 0–0 (at ATP Tour level, Grand Slam level, and in Davis Cup)
- Career titles: 1 ATP Challenger, 6 ITF
- Highest ranking: No. 321 (10 August 2026)
- Current ranking: No. 321 (10 August 2026)

Doubles
- Career record: 0–0 (at ATP Tour level, Grand Slam level, and in Davis Cup)
- Career titles: 4 ITF
- Highest ranking: No. 547 (24 July 2023)
- Last updated on: 10 August 2026.

Gabriele Piraino (born 12 November 2003) is an Italian tennis player. Piraino has a career high ATP singles ranking of No. 321 achieved on 10 August 2026 and a career high ATP doubles ranking of No. 547 achieved on 24 July 2023.

== Career ==
Piraino won the ATP Challenger singles title at the 2026 Plovdiv Challenger II.
