= Yanaki Milev =

Bulgarian tennis player

- Country (sports): Bulgaria
- Born: 15 April 2004 (age 22) Plovdiv, Bulgaria
- Height: 1.80 m (5 ft 11 in)
- Plays: Right-handed (two-handed backhand)
- Coach: Milko Milev
- Prize money: US$ 86,501

Singles
- Career record: 0–3 (at ATP Tour level, Grand Slam level, and in Davis Cup)
- Career titles: 0
- Highest ranking: No. 443 (26 August 2024)
- Current ranking: No. 611 (28 September 2026)

Doubles
- Career record: 2–2 (at ATP Tour level, Grand Slam level, and in Davis Cup)
- Career titles: 0
- Highest ranking: No. 343 (4 November 2024)
- Current ranking: No. 439 (28 September 2026)
- Last updated on: 30 September 2026.

Yanaki Milev (born 15 April 2004) is a Bulgarian tennis player. He has a career-high ATP singles ranking of world No. 443 achieved on 26 August 2024. He also has a career-high ATP doubles ranking of No. 343 achieved on 4 November 2024.

== Career ==
Milev made his ATP main draw debut at the 2022 Sofia Open after receiving a wildcard into the doubles main draw with Petr Nesterov. They reached the quarterfinals, defeating Jack Vance and Jamie Vance, before losing to eventual champions Rafael Matos and David Vega Hernández. He also received a wildcard for the 2023 Sofia Open in the singles qualifying competition, and for the doubles main draw again with Nesterov, where they also reached the quarterfinals, defeating Spanish duo of defending champion David Vega Hernández and Íñigo Cervantes.

== Year-end ATP ranking ==
Year	2021	2022	2023	2024	2025
Singles	1876	894	524	500	733
Doubles	1875	611	606	398	710

== Challenger and ITF World Tennis Tour finals ==
=== Singles: 11 (4–7) ===
Legend (singles) ATP Challenger Tour (0-1) ITF World Tennis Tour (4–6)	Titles by surface Hard (0–0) Clay (4–7) Grass (0–0)

Result	W–L	Date	Tournament	Tier	Surface	Opponent	Score
Loss	0–1	Dec 2022	M15 Antalya, Turkey	World Tennis Tour	Clay	(Germany) Rudolf Molleker	3–6, 4–6
Loss	0–2	Jan 2023	M15 Antalya, Turkey	World Tennis Tour	Clay	(Sweden) Dragoș Nicolae Mădăraș	3–6, 2–6
Win	1–2	Mar 2023	M15 Antalya, Turkey	World Tennis Tour	Clay	(France) Sean Cuenin	4–6, 6–2, 6–2
Win	2–2	Apr 2023	M15 Antalya, Turkey	World Tennis Tour	Clay	(Sweden) Dragoș Nicolae Mădăraș	6–4, 0–6, 6–4
Loss	2–3	Oct 2023	M25 Pazardzhik, Bulgaria	World Tennis Tour	Clay	(France) Clément Tabur	2–6, 6–3, 2–6
Win	3–3	Mar 2024	M15 Antalya, Turkey	World Tennis Tour	Clay	(Italy) Giuseppe La Vela	6–3, 6–1
Loss	3–4	Mar 2024	M15 Antalya, Turkey	World Tennis Tour	Clay	(Netherlands) Stijn Slump	4–6, 6–3, 4–6
Loss	3–5	Apr 2024	M15 Antalya, Turkey	World Tennis Tour	Clay	(Switzerland) Jérôme Kym	5–7, 2–6
Loss	3–6	May 2024	M15 Antalya, Turkey	World Tennis Tour	Clay	(Norway) Nicolai Budkov Kjaer	1–6, 0–6
Win	4–6	Jun 2024	M15 Kuršumlijska Banja, Serbia	World Tennis Tour	Clay	(Ukraine) Oleg Prihodko	7–6^{(7–4)}, 6–3
Loss	4–7	Sep 2026	Plovdiv, Bulgaria	Challenger	Clay	(Ukraine) Georgii Kravchenko	0–6, 2–6

=== Doubles: 16 (5–11) ===
Legend (doubles) ATP Challenger Tour (0–1) ITF World Tennis Tour (5–10)	Titles by surface Hard (1–2) Clay (4–9) Grass (0–0) Carpet (0–0)

Result	W–L	Date	Tournament	Tier	Surface	Partner	Opponents	Score
Loss	0–1	Oct 2022	M15 Sozopol, Bulgaria	World Tennis Tour	Hard	(Bulgaria) Petr Nesterov	(Poland) Maks Kaśnikowski (Poland) Olaf Pieczkowski	3–6, 5–7
Win	1–1	Oct 2022	M15 Sozopol, Bulgaria	World Tennis Tour	Hard	(Bulgaria) Petr Nesterov	(Bulgaria) Adriano Dhzenev (Bulgaria) Anthony Genov	6–3, 6–2
Win	2–1	Jan 2023	M15 Antalya, Turkey	World Tennis Tour	Clay	(Austria) Matthias Ujvary	(France) Quentin Folliot (France) Arthur Reymond	3–6, 6–2, [10–6]
Loss	2–2	Jun 2023	M25 Skopje, North Macedonia	World Tennis Tour	Clay	(Bulgaria) Petr Nesterov	(France) Sascha Gueymard Wayenburg (France) Antoine Hoang	1–6, 2–6
Loss	2–3	Jul 2024	Verona, Italy	Challenger	Clay	(Bulgaria) Petr Nesterov	(Brazil) Marcelo Demoliner (Argentina) Guillermo Durán	7–6^{(8–6)}, 6–7^{(3–7)}, [13–15]
Win	3–3	Oct 2024	M25 Santa Margherita di Pula, Italy	World Tennis Tour	Clay	(Bulgaria) Petr Nesterov	(Italy) Alessandro Spadola (Italy) Matteo Vavassori	7–6^{(7–4)}, 6–3
Win	4–3	Oct 2024	M25 Santa Margherita di Pula, Italy	World Tennis Tour	Clay	(Bulgaria) Petr Nesterov	(Italy) Massimo Giunta (Italy) Mariano Tammaro	6–3, 6–3
Loss	4–4	Nov 2024	M15 Antalya, Turkey	World Tennis Tour	Clay	(Bulgaria) Petr Nesterov	(Germany) Tim Handel (Serbia) Stefan Popović	3–6, 2–6
Loss	4–5	Jan 2025	M15 Doha, Qatar	World Tennis Tour	Hard	(Bulgaria) Petr Nesterov	(Romania) Gabi Adrian Boitan (Romania) Bogdan Pavel	1–6, 2–6
Loss	4–6	Jul 2025	M25 Gandia, Spain	World Tennis Tour	Clay	(Switzerland) Adrien Burdet	(Spain) Diego Augusto Barreto Sánchez (Spain) Alejandro Manzanera Pertusa	2–6, 2–6
Win	5–6	Oct 2025	M25 Zaragoza, Spain	World Tennis Tour	Clay	(Spain) Álvaro Bueno Gil	(Spain) Alvaro Jimenez (Spain) Keoni Puig McCallan	6–4, 6–4
Loss	5–7	Jan 2026	M25 Antalya, Turkey	World Tennis Tour	Clay	(Serbia) Stefan Popović	(Italy) Federico Bondioli (Italy) Raúl Brancaccio	3–6, 7–5, [7–10]
Loss	5–8	Feb 2026	M25 Antalya, Turkey	World Tennis Tour	Clay	(Serbia) Stefan Popović	(United Kingdom) Felix Mischker (Belgium) Martin van der Meerschen	1–6, 6–2, [8–10]
Loss	5–9	Mar 2026	M25 Santa Margherita di Pula, Italy	World Tennis Tour	Clay	(South Africa) Philip Henning	(Turkey) Ergi Kırkın (Germany) Niels McDonald	1–6, 3–6
Loss	5–10	May 2026	M25 Santa Margherita di Pula, Italy	World Tennis Tour	Clay	(Serbia) Stefan Popović	(Italy) Marco Furlanetto (Switzerland) Nicolás Parizzia	3–6, 4–6
Loss	5–11	May 2026	M25 Grado, Italy	World Tennis Tour	Clay	(Argentina) Lucio Ratti	(Denmark) Oskar Brostrøm Poulsen (Sweden) Nikola Slavic	6–4, 4–6, [9–11]

== National participation ==
=== Davis Cup (2 wins, 3 losses) ===
Yanaki Milev debuted for the Bulgaria Davis Cup team in 2023. Since then he has 5 nominations with 4 ties played; his singles W/L record is 2–3 and doubles W/L record is 0–0 (2–3 overall).

Group membership World Group (0–0) WG Play-off (0–0) Group I (0–3) Group II (2–0) Group III (0–0) Group IV (0–0)	Matches by surface Hard (0–1) Clay (2–2) Grass (0–0) Carpet (0–0)	Matches by type Singles (2–3) Doubles (0–0)

- ▲ ▼ indicates the result of the Davis Cup match followed by the score, date, place of event, the zonal classification and its phase, and the court surface.

Rubber result	No.	Rubber	Match type (partner if any)	Opponent nation	Opponent player(s)	Score
▼1–3; 16–17 September 2023; Bulgarian National Tennis Center, Sofia, Bulgaria; World Group I; Clay surface
Defeat	1	II	Singles	Kazakhstan	Alexander Bublik	4–6, 1–6
▼1–3; 3–4 February 2024; Tennis Center Avenue, Burgas, Bulgaria; World Group I Play-Off; Hard (i) surface
Defeat	2	II	Singles	Bosnia and Herzegovina	Damir Džumhur	3–6, 2–6
▲3–2; 14–16 September 2024; Tennis Club Lokomotiv, Plovdiv, Bulgaria; World Group II; Clay surface
Victory	3	II	Singles	El Salvador	César Cruz	6–3, 4–6, 6–3
Victory	4	V	Singles	El Salvador	Marcelo Arévalo	2–6, 6–1, 7–6^{(8–6)}
▲3–2; 13–14 September 2025; Tennis Club Lokomotiv, Plovdiv, Bulgaria; World Group I; Clay surface
Defeat	5	IV	Singles	Finland	Eero Vasa	2–6, 2–6
