= Georgii Kravchenko =

Ukrainian tennis player (born 2000)

- Country (sports): Ukraine
- Born: 28 July 2000 (age 26) Kyiv, Ukraine
- Height: 1.80 m (5 ft 11 in)
- Plays: Right-handed (two-handed backhand)
- Coach: Óscar Hernández, Salvador Navarro
- Prize money: US $151,548

Singles
- Career record: 0–0 (at ATP Tour level, Grand Slam level, and in Davis Cup)
- Career titles: 1 Challenger, 5 ITF
- Highest ranking: No. 274 (9 November 2026)
- Current ranking: No. 274 (9 November 2026)

Doubles
- Career record: 0–0 (at ATP Tour level, Grand Slam level, and in Davis Cup)
- Career titles: 7 ITF
- Highest ranking: No. 352 (3 October 2022)
- Current ranking: No. 393 (9 November 2026)
- Last updated on: 9 November 2026.

Georgii Kravchenko (born 28 July 2000) is a Ukrainian tennis player. He has a career high ATP singles ranking of No. 274 achieved on 9 November 2026 and a career high ATP doubles ranking of No. 352 achieved on 3 October 2022.

Kravchenko has won one ATP Challenger singles title at the 2026 Plovdiv Challenger III.
