= 2026 Royan Atlantique Open – Doubles =

Doubles
- 2026 Royan Atlantique Open

Final
- Champions: (Netherlands) Daniel de Jonge (Germany) Jannik Opitz
- Runners-up: (Spain) Ignasi Forcano (Netherlands) Mark Vervoort
- Score: 6–4, 6–4

Events
Singles	Doubles
- Royan Atlantique Open

Matej Dodig and Nino Serdarušić were the defending champions but chose not to defend their title.

Daniel de Jonge and Jannik Opitz won the title after defeating Ignasi Forcano and Mark Vervoort 6–4, 6–4 in the final.

== Seeds ==
1. (India) S D Prajwal Dev / (India) Nitin Kumar Sinha (quarterfinals)
2. (Argentina) Lucio Ratti / (Argentina) Franco Ribero (semifinals)
3. (South Africa) Philip Henning / (Peru) Alexander Merino (semifinals)
4. (Italy) Simone Agostini / (Sweden) Oliver Johansson (first round)

== Draw ==
Key

- Q = Qualifier
- WC = Wild card
- LL = Lucky loser
- Alt = Alternate
- ITF = ITF entry
- PR = Protected ranking
- SR = Special ranking
- SE = Special exempt
- JE = Junior exempt
- JR = Junior Accelerator Programme entrant
- CO = College Accelerator Programme entrant
- NG = Next Gen Accelerator Program entrant
- w/o = Walkover
- r = Retired
- d = Defaulted

First round
WC	(France) Gabriel Gomez (France) Cosme Rolland de Ravel	1	1
(Netherlands) D de Jonge (Germany) J Opitz	6	6
(France) R Bertrand (France) G Blancaneaux	2	2
(Spain) M Alcalá Gurri (Spain) A Santamarta Roig	6	6
(France) M Janvier (Ukraine) V Uzhylovskyi	6^{3}	3
(Spain) Ignasi Forcano (Netherlands) M Vervoort	7^{7}	6
(Japan) Yamato Sueoka (Japan) N Tajima	7^{7}	6
4	(Italy) Simone Agostini (Sweden) Oliver Johansson	6^{3}	4
(Australia) T Fancutt (New Zealand) A Rai	6	6
(Chinese Taipei) J Hsu (United States) Michael Zhu	1	2

Quarterfinals
1	(India) SDP Dev (India) Nitin Kumar Sinha	6	1	[5]
(Netherlands) D de Jonge (Germany) J Opitz	1	6	[10]
3	(South Africa) P Henning (Peru) A Merino	6	6
(Spain) M Alcalá Gurri (Spain) A Santamarta Roig	1	4
(Spain) I Forcano (Netherlands) M Vervoort	7^{9}	2	[10]
(Japan) Y Sueoka (Japan) N Tajima	6^{7}	6	[7]
(Australia) T Fancutt (New Zealand) A Rai	5	7	[2]
2	(Argentina) Lucio Ratti (Argentina) F Ribero	7	5	[10]

Semifinals
(Netherlands) D de Jonge (Germany) J Opitz	6	3	[10]
3	(South Africa) P Henning (Peru) A Merino	4	6	[5]
(Spain) I Forcano (Netherlands) M Vervoort	6	3	[10]
2	(Argentina) L Ratti (Argentina) F Ribero	4	6	[5]

Final
(Netherlands) D de Jonge (Germany) J Opitz	6	6
(Spain) I Forcano (Netherlands) M Vervoort	4	4
