= 2022 ITF Men's World Tennis Tour =

Details
- Duration: 3 January – December 2022
- Edition: 25th
- Tournaments: 526
- Categories: M25 tournaments (206); M15 tournaments (320)

Achievements (singles)
- Most titles: (Tunisia) Skander Mansouri (Australia) Dane Sweeny (China) Bu Yunchaokete (6)
- Most finals: (Tunisia) Skander Mansouri (Germany) Timo Stodder (8)

The 2022 International Tennis Federation (ITF) Men's World Tennis Tour is an entry-level tour for Men's professional tennis. It is organized by the International Tennis Federation and is a tier below the ATP Challenger Tour. The Men's ITF World Tennis Tour includes tournaments with prize money of either $US15,000 or $25,000. The results of ITF tournaments are incorporated into the ATP ranking, which enables professionals to progress to the ATP Challenger Tour and ATP Tour, and ultimately the Grand Slams. The Tour offers 526 tournaments across 60 countries.

Tournaments at $15,000 level include reserved main draw places for Top 100-ranked ITF World Tennis Tour Juniors.

From 1 March, following the Russian invasion of Ukraine the ITF announced that players from Belarus and Russia could still play on the tour but would not be allowed to play under the flag of Belarus or Russia.

== Cancelled/postponed tournaments ==
The following tournaments were formally announced by the ITF before being subsequently cancelled or postponed due to the COVID-19 pandemic or other reasons.

Week of	Tournament	Status
January 3	Chiang Rai, Thailand; M15 – hard	Postponed to April 4
January 10	Chiang Rai, Thailand; M15 – hard	Postponed to April 11
January 17	Doha, Qatar; M15 – hard	Cancelled
January 17	Bressuire, France; M15+H – hard (i)	Cancelled
January 17	Chiang Rai, Thailand; M15 – hard	Postponed to April 18
January 24	Nußloch, Germany; M25 – carpet (i)	Cancelled
January 24	Doha, Qatar; M15 – hard	Cancelled
January 24	Chiang Rai, Thailand; M15 – hard	Postponed to April 25
January 31	Doha, Qatar; M15 – hard	Cancelled
April 4	Kazan, Russia; M25 – hard (i)	Cancelled due to the Russian invasion of Ukraine
April 18	Vyshkovo, Ukraine; M15 – clay	Cancelled due to the Russian invasion of Ukraine
May 9	Greenville, United States; M15 – hard	Cancelled
May 16	Skopje, North Macedonia; M15 – clay	Postponed to June 6
May 23	Cairo, Egypt; M15 – clay	Cancelled
May 23	Skopje, North Macedonia; M15 – clay	Postponed to June 13
May 23	Novomoskovsk, Ukraine; M15 – clay (i)	Cancelled due to the Russian invasion of Ukraine
May 30	Novomoskovsk, Ukraine; M25 – clay (i)	Cancelled due to the Russian invasion of Ukraine
June 6	Almada, Portugal; M25 – hard	Cancelled
June 6	Enköping, Sweden; M15 – clay	Cancelled
June 13	Almada, Portugal; M25 – hard	Cancelled
June 13	Enköping, Sweden; M15 – clay	Cancelled
June 20	Enköping, Sweden; M15 – clay	Cancelled
June 27	Enköping, Sweden; M15 – clay	Cancelled
July 25	Cancún, Mexico; M15 – hard	Cancelled
August 1	Cancún, Mexico; M15 – hard	Cancelled
August 8	Bad Waltersdorf, Austria; M25 – clay	Cancelled
October 10	Platja d'Aro, Spain; M25 – clay	Cancelled

== Participating host nations ==
- Algeria (ALG)
- Argentina (ARG)
- Australia (AUS)
- Austria (AUT)
- Belgium (BEL)
- Bolivia (BOL)
- Bosnia and Herzegovina (BIH)
- Brazil (BRA)
- Bulgaria (BUL)
- Canada (CAN)
- Colombia (COL)
- Croatia (CRO)
- Czech Republic (CZE)
- Denmark (DEN)
- Dominican Republic (DOM)
- Ecuador (ECU)
- Egypt (EGY)
- Estonia (EST)
- Finland (FIN)
- France (FRA)
- Georgia (GEO)
- Germany (GER)
- Great Britain (GBR)
- Greece (GRE)
- Guam (GUM)
- Hungary (HUN)
- India (IND)
- Indonesia (INA)
- Israel (ISR)
- Italy (ITA)
- Japan (JPN)
- Kazakhstan (KAZ)
- Kuwait (KUW)
- Lithuania (LTU)
- Luxembourg (LUX)
- Malaysia (MAS)
- Mexico (MEX)
- Montenegro (MNE)
- Morocco (MAR)
- Mozambique (MOZ)
- Netherlands (NED)
- New Zealand (NZL)
- North Macedonia (MKD)
- Peru (PER)
- Poland (POL)
- Portugal (POR)
- Romania (ROU)
- Russia (RUS)
- Serbia (SRB)
- Slovakia (SVK)
- Slovenia (SLO)
- South Korea (KOR)
- Spain (ESP)
- Sri Lanka (SRI)
- Sweden (SWE)
- Switzerland (SUI)
- Thailand (THA)
- Tunisia (TUN)
- Turkey (TUR)
- United States (USA)
- Vietnam (VIE)

== Ranking points distribution ==
Category	W	F	SF	QF	R16	R32	Q	Q2	Q1
↓ ATP Ranking Points ↓
M25+H (S) / M25 (S)	25	16	8	3	1	–	–	–	–
M25+H (D) / M25 (D)	25	16	8	3	–	–	–	–	–
M15+H (S) / M15 (S)	15	8	4	2	1	–	–	–	–
M15+H (D) / M15 (D)	15	8	4	2	–	–	–	–	–
↓ ITF World Tennis Ranking Points ↓
M25+H (S)	–	–	–	–	–	–	4	1	–
M25 (S)	–	–	–	–	–	–	3	1	–
M15+H (S)	–	–	–	–	–	–	3	1	–
M15 (S)	–	–	–	–	–	–	2	1	–

- "+H" indicates that hospitality is provided.

== Prize money distribution ==
Category	W	F	SF	QF	R16	R32
M25+H (S) / M25 (S)	$3,600	$2,120	$1,255	$730	$430	$260
M25+H (D) / M25 (D)	$1,550	$900	$540	$320	$180	–
M15+H (S) / M15 (S)	$2,160	$1,272	$753	$438	$258	$156
M15+H (D) / M15 (D)	$930	$540	$324	$192	$108	–

- Doubles prize money per team

== Statistics ==
These tables present the number of singles (S) and doubles (D) titles won by each player and each nation during the season. The players/nations are sorted by:

1. Total number of titles (a doubles title won by two players representing the same nation counts as only one win for the nation)
2. A singles > doubles hierarchy
3. Alphabetical order (by family names for players).

To avoid confusion and double counting, these tables should be updated only after all events of the week are completed.

=== Titles won by player ===
2022 Titles won by player

Total	Player	M25		M15		Total	
Total	Player	S	D	S	D	S	D
12	Skander Mansouri (TUN)	3	2	3	4	6	6
12	Hsu Yu-hsiou (TPE)	3	8		1	3	9
11	Neil Oberleitner (AUT)		8		3	0	11
10	Dane Sweeny (AUS)	5	4	1		6	4
10	Timo Stodder (GER)	2	4	2	2	4	6
10	Arthur Bouquier (FRA)		4		6	0	10
9	Bu Yunchaokete (CHN)	2	1	4	2	6	3
9	Daniel Cukierman (ISR)	2	5	1	1	3	6
9	Samuel Vincent Ruggeri (ITA)	1		2	6	3	6
9	David Pichler (AUT)		1	1	7	1	8
8	Murkel Dellien (BOL)		3	4	1	4	4
8	Yuta Shimizu (JPN)		1	3	4	3	5
8	Kaito Uesugi (JPN)		2		6	0	8
7	Carlos López Montagud (ESP)	2	2	3		5	2
7	Aziz Dougaz (TUN)	1	1	4	1	5	2
7	Mattia Bellucci (ITA)	1		4	2	5	2
7	Michael Vrbenský (CZE)	2	2	2	1	4	3
7	Hong Seong-chan (KOR)	1	2	1	3	2	5
7	Sandro Kopp (AUT)		3	2	2	2	5
7	Nam Ji-sung (KOR)		2	1	4	1	6
7	Julian Cash (GBR)		5		2	0	7
7	Ivan Liutarevich		5		2	0	7
7	Rithvik Choudary Bollipalli (IND)		3		4	0	7
7	Niki Kaliyanda Poonacha (IND)		3		4	0	7
7	Kai Wehnelt (GER)		3		4	0	7
6	Lý Hoàng Nam (VIE)	1		4	1	5	1
6	Gauthier Onclin (BEL)	1		4	1	5	1
6	Vladyslav Orlov (UKR)	3		1	2	4	2
6	Álvaro López San Martín (ESP)	1	2	2	1	3	3
6	Oleksandr Ovcharenko (UKR)	1	1	2	2	3	3
6	Marcello Serafini (ITA)		1	3	2	3	3
6	Robin Bertrand (FRA)			3	3	3	3
6	Karl Friberg (SWE)			3	3	3	3
6	Leonardo Aboian (ARG)	1	3	1	1	2	4
6	Andrew Paulson (CZE)	1	3	1	1	2	4
6	Alberto Barroso Campos (ESP)	1	1	1	3	2	4
6	Ilya Snițari (MDA)		3	2	1	2	4
6	Akira Santillan (AUS)	1	4		1	1	5
6	Ryan Nijboer (NED)		3	1	2	1	5
6	Henry Patten (GBR)		6			0	6
6	Brandon Walkin (AUS)		5		1	0	6
6	Arklon Huertas del Pino (PER)		4		2	0	6
6	Giles Hussey (GBR)		4		2	0	6
6	Johannes Ingildsen (DEN)		4		2	0	6
6	Song Min-kyu (KOR)		4		2	0	6
6	Mick Veldheer (NED)		4		2	0	6
6	Mircea-Alexandru Jecan (ROU)		3		3	0	6
6	Tyler Zink (USA)		2		4	0	6
6	Trey Hilderbrand (USA)		1		5	0	6
6	Szymon Kielan (POL)				6	0	6
6	Marat Sharipov				6	0	6
5	Laurent Lokoli (FRA)	4		1		5	0
5	Mathys Erhard (FRA)	2		3		5	0
5	Brandon Holt (USA)	1		4		5	0
5	Rio Noguchi (JPN)	4	1			4	1
5	Ugo Blanchet (FRA)	3	1	1		4	1
5	Raphaël Collignon (BEL)	3		1	1	4	1
5	Nicholas David Ionel (ROU)	2		2	1	4	1
5	Jakub Menšík (CZE)	1		3	1	4	1
5	Titouan Droguet (FRA)	3	2			3	2
5	Alastair Gray (GBR)	3	2			3	2
5	Li Tu (AUS)	3	2			3	2
5	Joris De Loore (BEL)	2	2	1		3	2
5	Alibek Kachmazov	1	1	2	1	3	2
5	Eduardo Ribeiro (BRA)	1		2	2	3	2
5	Simon Beaupain (BEL)			3	2	3	2
5	Oriol Roca Batalla (ESP)	2	3			2	3
5	Johannus Monday (GBR)	1	3	1		2	3
5	Damien Wenger (SUI)		3	1	1	1	4
5	Charles Broom (GBR)		2	1	2	1	4
5	Tristan McCormick (USA)		2	1	2	1	4
5	Alexander Donski (BUL)		1	1	3	1	4
5	Oleg Prihodko (UKR)		1	1	3	1	4
5	Tim Sandkaulen (GER)		4		1	0	5
5	James Frawley (AUS)		2		3	0	5
5	Ray Ho (TPE)		2		3	0	5
5	Martin Breysach (FRA)				5	0	5
5	Aziz Ouakaa (TUN)				5	0	5
5	Finn Reynolds (NZL)				5	0	5
5	Francesco Vilardo (ITA)				5	0	5
4	Térence Atmane (FRA)	1		3		4	0
4	Max Houkes (NED)	1		3		4	0
4	Omar Jasika (AUS)	1		3		4	0
4	Dino Prižmić (CRO)			4		4	0
4	Bernard Tomic (AUS)			4		4	0
4	Hernán Casanova (ARG)	3	1			3	1
4	Pol Martín Tiffon (ESP)	3	1			3	1
4	Valerio Aboian (ARG)	1		2	1	3	1
4	Toby Samuel (GBR)	1		2	1	3	1
4	Eliakim Coulibaly (CIV)		1	3		3	1
4	Alexander Weis (ITA)		1	3		3	1
4	Dragoș Nicolae Mădăraș (SWE)			3	1	3	1
4	Adam Walton (AUS)			3	1	3	1
4	Marek Gengel (CZE)	2	2			2	2
4	Rimpei Kawakami (JPN)	1		1	2	2	2
4	Ethan Quinn (USA)	1		1	2	2	2
4	Daniel Rincón (ESP)	1		1	2	2	2
4	Jaime Faria (POR)		1	2	1	2	2
4	Jorge Panta (PER)			2	2	2	2
4	Robert Strombachs (LAT)			2	2	2	2
4	Benjamin Lock (ZIM)	1	2		1	1	3
4	James Kent Trotter (JPN)	1	2		1	1	3
4	Andrés Andrade (ECU)		2	1	1	1	3
4	Alex Knaff (LUX)		1	1	2	1	3
4	Yuki Mochizuki (JPN)		1	1	2	1	3
4	Ignacio Monzón (ARG)		1	1	2	1	3
4	Blu Baker (GBR)			1	3	1	3
4	Adam Moundir (MAR)			1	3	1	3
4	Christoph Negritu (GER)			1	3	1	3
4	Manish Sureshkumar (IND)			1	3	1	3
4	Miķelis Lībietis (LAT)		4			0	4
4	Théo Arribagé (FRA)		3		1	0	4
4	Cezar Crețu (ROU)		3		1	0	4
4	Luke Johnson (GBR)		3		1	0	4
4	Joshua Paris (GBR)		3		1	0	4
4	Colin Sinclair (NMI)		3		1	0	4
4	Michiel de Krom (NED)		2		2	0	4
4	Scott Duncan (GBR)		2		2	0	4
4	Constantin Frantzen (GER)		2		2	0	4
4	Conner Huertas del Pino (PER)		2		2	0	4
4	Ben Jones (GBR)		2		2	0	4
4	Petr Nouza (CZE)		2		2	0	4
4	Andrea Picchione (ITA)		2		2	0	4
4	George Goldhoff (USA)		1		3	0	4
4	Noah Schachter (USA)		1		3	0	4
4	Niklas Schell (GER)		1		3	0	4
4	Eero Vasa (FIN)		1		3	0	4
4	Constantin Bittoun Kouzmine (FRA)				4	0	4
4	Anis Ghorbel (TUN)				4	0	4
4	Maximus Jones (THA)				4	0	4
4	Ryota Tanuma (JPN)				4	0	4
3	Kacper Żuk (POL)	3				3	0
3	Nick Hardt (DOM)	2		1		3	0
3	Mark Lajal (EST)	1		2		3	0
3	Hamad Međedović (SRB)	1		2		3	0
3	Daniel Michalski (POL)	1		2		3	0
3	Rudolf Molleker (GER)	1		2		3	0
3	Lukas Neumayer (AUT)	1		2		3	0
3	Valentin Vacherot (MON)	1		2		3	0
3	Kalin Ivanovski (MKD)			3		3	0
3	Alexandar Lazarov (BUL)			3		3	0
3	Abedallah Shelbayh (JOR)			3		3	0
3	Arthur Fery (GBR)	2	1			2	1
3	Rinky Hijikata (AUS)	2	1			2	1
3	Antoine Hoang (FRA)	2	1			2	1
3	Ivan Gakhov	1		1	1	2	1
3	Lucas Gerch (GER)		1	2		2	1
3	Shintaro Imai (JPN)		1	2		2	1
3	Edoardo Lavagno (ITA)		1	2		2	1
3	Sekou Bangoura (USA)			2	1	2	1
3	Andrey Chepelev			2	1	2	1
3	Arjun Kadhe (IND)			2	1	2	1
3	Giovanni Oradini (ITA)			2	1	2	1
3	Ben Patael (ISR)			2	1	2	1
3	Saba Purtseladze (GEO)			2	1	2	1
3	Sascha Gueymard Wayenburg (FRA)	1	2			1	2
3	Federico Arnaboldi (ITA)	1	1		1	1	2
3	Rémy Bertola (SUI)	1	1		1	1	2
3	Gianmarco Ferrari (ITA)	1	1		1	1	2
3	Huang Tsung-hao (TPE)	1			2	1	2
3	Dan Added (FRA)		2	1		1	2
3	Makoto Ochi (JPN)		2	1		1	2
3	Kyle Seelig (USA)		2	1		1	2
3	Duarte Vale (POR)		2	1		1	2
3	Enrico Dalla Valle (ITA)		1	1	1	1	2
3	Peter Heller (GER)		1	1	1	1	2
3	August Holmgren (DEN)		1	1	1	1	2
3	Shunsuke Mitsui (JPN)		1	1	1	1	2
3	Ștefan Paloși (ROU)		1	1	1	1	2
3	Chris Rodesch (LUX)		1	1	1	1	2
3	Bogdan Bobrov			1	2	1	2
3	Ezekiel Clark (USA)			1	2	1	2
3	Alexander Cozbinov (MDA)			1	2	1	2
3	Federico Iannaccone (ITA)			1	2	1	2
3	Kim Cheong-eui (KOR)			1	2	1	2
3	Victor Lilov (USA)			1	2	1	2
3	Daisuke Sumizawa (JPN)			1	2	1	2
3	Fermín Tenti (ARG)			1	2	1	2
3	Íñigo Cervantes (ESP)		3			0	3
3	Simon Freund (SWE)		3			0	3
3	Calum Puttergill (AUS)		3			0	3
3	Jason Taylor (AUS)		3			0	3
3	Patrick Zahraj (GER)		3			0	3
3	Marcelo Zormann (BRA)		3			0	3
3	Francis Alcantara (PHI)		2		1	0	3
3	Courtney John Lock (ZIM)		2		1	0	3
3	Tomohiro Masabayashi (JPN)		2		1	0	3
3	Sun Fajing (CHN)		2		1	0	3
3	Seita Watanabe (JPN)		2		1	0	3
3	Mark Whitehouse (GBR)		2		1	0	3
3	Marcus Willis (GBR)		2		1	0	3
3	Aaron Addison (AUS)		1		2	0	3
3	Thomas Fancutt (AUS)		1		2	0	3
3	Alejandro García (ESP)		1		2	0	3
3	Pruchya Isaro (THA)		1		2	0	3
3	Grigoriy Lomakin (KAZ)		1		2	0	3
3	Mario Mansilla Díez (ESP)		1		2	0	3
3	John McNally (USA)		1		2	0	3
3	Lukáš Pokorný (SVK)		1		2	0	3
3	Luca Sanchez (FRA)		1		2	0	3
3	Lorenzo Claverie (ITA)				3	0	3
3	Mikhail Fufygin				3	0	3
3	Shinji Hazawa (JPN)				3	0	3
3	Kai Lemstra (GER)				3	0	3
3	Parikshit Somani (IND)				3	0	3
3	Volodymyr Uzhylovskyi (UKR)				3	0	3
3	Daniel Vallejo (PAR)				3	0	3
3	Cyril Vandermeersch (FRA)				3	0	3
3	Zhang Ze (CHN)				3	0	3
3	Zheng Baoluo (CHN)				3	0	3
2	Javier Barranco Cosano (ESP)	2				2	0
2	Oliver Crawford (USA)	2				2	0
2	Martin Damm (USA)	2				2	0
2	Gustavo Heide (BRA)	2				2	0
2	Jason Kubler (AUS)	2				2	0
2	Alejandro Moro Canas (ESP)	2				2	0
2	Dominik Palán (CZE)	2				2	0
2	Leandro Riedi (SUI)	2				2	0
2	Sho Shimabukuro (JPN)	2				2	0
2	Louis Wessels (GER)	2				2	0
2	Gonzalo Lama (CHI)	1		1		2	0
2	Marvin Möller (GER)	1		1		2	0
2	Valentin Royer (FRA)	1		1		2	0
2	Adrià Soriano Barrera (ESP)	1		1		2	0
2	Matías Soto (CHI)	1		1		2	0
2	Clément Tabur (FRA)	1		1		2	0
2	Jaimee Floyd Angele (FRA)			2		2	0
2	Alec Deckers (NED)			2		2	0
2	Matías Franco Descotte (ARG)			2		2	0
2	Gergely Madarász (HUN)			2		2	0
2	Tao Mu (CHN)			2		2	0
2	Juan Bautista Otegui (ARG)			2		2	0
2	Zachary Svajda (USA)			2		2	0
2	Luca Tomasetto (ITA)			2		2	0
2	Kris van Wyk (RSA)			2		2	0
2	Olle Wallin (SWE)			2		2	0
2	JC Aragone (USA)	1	1			1	1
2	Geoffrey Blancaneaux (FRA)	1	1			1	1
2	Eduard Esteve Lobato (ESP)	1	1			1	1
2	Benjamin Hassan (LIB)	1	1			1	1
2	Oleksii Krutykh (UKR)	1	1			1	1
2	Aidan McHugh (GBR)	1	1			1	1
2	Iñaki Montes de la Torre (ESP)	1	1			1	1
2	Govind Nanda (USA)	1	1			1	1
2	Mats Rosenkranz (GER)	1	1			1	1
2	Lukáš Rosol (CZE)	1	1			1	1
2	Harry Wendelken (GBR)	1	1			1	1
2	Denis Yevseyev (KAZ)	1	1			1	1
2	Román Andrés Burruchaga (ARG)	1			1	1	1
2	Sergey Fomin (UZB)	1			1	1	1
2	Hady Habib (LIB)	1			1	1	1
2	Àlex Martí Pujolràs (ESP)	1			1	1	1
2	Edward Winter (AUS)	1			1	1	1
2	Justin Boulais (CAN)		1	1		1	1
2	Francesco Forti (ITA)		1	1		1	1
2	Sebastian Gima (ROU)		1	1		1	1
2	Imanol López Morillo (ESP)		1	1		1	1
2	Park Ui-sung (KOR)		1	1		1	1
2	Michail Pervolarakis (GRE)		1	1		1	1
2	Max Alcalá Gurri (ESP)			1	1	1	1
2	Bekhan Atlangeriev			1	1	1	1
2	Alex Barrena (ARG)			1	1	1	1
2	Alec Beckley (RSA)			1	1	1	1
2	Pedro Boscardin Dias (BRA)			1	1	1	1
2	Gonzalo Bueno (PER)			1	1	1	1
2	Felix Gill (GBR)			1	1	1	1
2	Maks Kaśnikowski (POL)			1	1	1	1
2	Palaphoom Kovapitukted (THA)			1	1	1	1
2	Lee Jea-moon (KOR)			1	1	1	1
2	Mirko Martinez (SUI)			1	1	1	1
2	Alex Michelsen (USA)			1	1	1	1
2	Jonathan Mridha (SWE)			1	1	1	1
2	Tadeáš Paroulek (CZE)			1	1	1	1
2	José Pereira (BRA)			1	1	1	1
2	Juan Carlos Prado Ángelo (BOL)			1	1	1	1
2	Ajeet Rai (NZL)			1	1	1	1
2	Shuichi Sekiguchi (JPN)			1	1	1	1
2	Ilia Simakin			1	1	1	1
2	Te Rigele (CHN)			1	1	1	1
2	Luca Van Assche (FRA)			1	1	1	1
2	Eric Vanshelboim (UKR)			1	1	1	1
2	Nicolas Zanellato (BRA)			1	1	1	1
2	Domagoj Bilješko (CRO)		2			0	2
2	Santiago de la Fuente (ARG)		2			0	2
2	Mikalai Haliak		2			0	2
2	Mats Hermans (NED)		2			0	2
2	Kirill Kivattsev		2			0	2
2	Orlando Luz (BRA)		2			0	2
2	Vladyslav Manafov (UKR)		2			0	2
2	Toshihide Matsui (JPN)		2			0	2
2	Takuto Niki (JPN)		2			0	2
2	Mili Poljičak (CRO)		2			0	2
2	Luca Potenza (ITA)		2			0	2
2	Dalibor Svrčina (CZE)		2			0	2
2	Petros Tsitsipas (GRE)		2			0	2
2	Takeru Yuzuki (JPN)		2			0	2
2	Jeremy Beale (AUS)		1		1	0	2
2	Fábio Coelho (POR)		1		1	0	2
2	Corentin Denolly (FRA)		1		1	0	2
2	Benjamin Hannestad (DEN)		1		1	0	2
2	Pablo Llamas Ruiz (ESP)		1		1	0	2
2	João Victor Couto Loureiro (BRA)		1		1	0	2
2	Eduardo Nava (USA)		1		1	0	2
2	Frane Ninčević (CRO)		1		1	0	2
2	Julian Ocleppo (ITA)		1		1	0	2
2	Sergi Pérez Contri (ESP)		1		1	0	2
2	Arthur Reymond (FRA)		1		1	0	2
2	Giorgio Ricca (ITA)		1		1	0	2
2	Ruan Roelofse (RSA)		1		1	0	2
2	Matthew Romios (AUS)		1		1	0	2
2	Tristan Schoolkate (AUS)		1		1	0	2
2	Alexandros Skorilas (GRE)		1		1	0	2
2	Benjamin Winter López (ESP)		1		1	0	2
2	Coleman Wong (HKG)		1		1	0	2
2	Juan Carlos Aguilar (CAN)				2	0	2
2	Abraham Asaba (GHA)				2	0	2
2	Siddhant Banthia (IND)				2	0	2
2	Petr Bar Biryukov				2	0	2
2	Illya Beloborodko (UKR)				2	0	2
2	Yuki Bhambri (IND)				2	0	2
2	Oleksandr Bielinskyi (UKR)				2	0	2
2	Antonín Bolardt (CZE)				2	0	2
2	Yan Bondarevskiy				2	0	2
2	Amr Elsayed (EGY)				2	0	2
2	Vladimir Filip (ROU)				2	0	2
2	Lorenzo Gagliardo (ARG)				2	0	2
2	Juan Ignacio Galarza (ARG)				2	0	2
2	Sai Karteek Reddy Ganta (IND)				2	0	2
2	Daniil Golubev				2	0	2
2	Juan Sebastián Gómez (COL)				2	0	2
2	Millen Hurrion (GBR)				2	0	2
2	Jarno Jans (NED)				2	0	2
2	William Jansen (GBR)				2	0	2
2	Jiří Jeníček (CZE)				2	0	2
2	Adam Jurajda (CZE)				2	0	2
2	Miloš Karol (SVK)				2	0	2
2	Timur Kiyamov				2	0	2
2	Younes Lalami Laaroussi (MAR)				2	0	2
2	Li Hanwen (CHN)				2	0	2
2	Aliaksandr Liaonenka				2	0	2
2	Tomás Lipovšek Puches (ARG)				2	0	2
2	Saketh Myneni (IND)				2	0	2
2	Daniel Pátý (CZE)				2	0	2
2	Bogdan Pavel (ROU)				2	0	2
2	Olaf Pieczkowski (POL)				2	0	2
2	Bruno Pujol Navarro (ESP)				2	0	2
2	Andrew Rogers (USA)				2	0	2
2	Olivier Rojas (BEL)				2	0	2
2	Ilya Rudiukov				2	0	2
2	Mohamed Safwat (EGY)				2	0	2
2	Mathieu Scaglia (FRA)				2	0	2
2	Leonid Sheyngezikht (BUL)				2	0	2
2	Christian Sigsgaard (DEN)				2	0	2
2	Daniel Siniakov (CZE)				2	0	2
2	Kelsey Stevenson (CAN)				2	0	2
2	Thantub Suksumrarn (THA)				2	0	2
2	Naoki Tajima (JPN)				2	0	2
2	Iiro Vasa (FIN)				2	0	2
2	Yann Wójcik (POL)				2	0	2
2	Alessio Zanotti (ITA)				2	0	2
2	Alexander Zgirovsky				2	0	2
2	Borys Zgoła (POL)				2	0	2
2	Evan Zhu (USA)				2	0	2
1	Mateus Alves (BRA)	1				1	0
1	Hynek Bartoň (CZE)	1				1	0
1	Elliot Benchetrit (MAR)	1				1	0
1	Alexander Bernard (USA)	1				1	0
1	Viacheslav Bielinskyi (UKR)	1				1	0
1	Alex Bolt (AUS)	1				1	0
1	Riccardo Bonadio (ITA)	1				1	0
1	Micah Braswell (USA)	1				1	0
1	Murphy Cassone (USA)	1				1	0
1	Clément Chidekh (FRA)	1				1	0
1	Roberto Cid Subervi (DOM)	1				1	0
1	Marius Copil (ROU)	1				1	0
1	Daniel Cox (GBR)	1				1	0
1	Kenny de Schepper (FRA)	1				1	0
1	Gabriel Diallo (CAN)	1				1	0
1	Moez Echargui (TUN)	1				1	0
1	Elmar Ejupovic (GER)	1				1	0
1	Antoine Escoffier (FRA)	1				1	0
1	Nerman Fatić (BIH)	1				1	0
1	Alexis Gautier (FRA)	1				1	0
1	Michael Geerts (BEL)	1				1	0
1	Billy Harris (GBR)	1				1	0
1	Ergi Kırkın (TUR)	1				1	0
1	Martin Krumich (CZE)	1				1	0
1	Christian Langmo (USA)	1				1	0
1	Timo Legout (FRA)	1				1	0
1	Wilson Leite (BRA)	1				1	0
1	Alejo Lorenzo Lingua Lavallén (ARG)	1				1	0
1	Francesco Maestrelli (ITA)	1				1	0
1	Fabian Marozsan (HUN)	1				1	0
1	Harold Mayot (FRA)	1				1	0
1	Filip Misolic (AUT)	1				1	0
1	Hiroki Moriya (JPN)	1				1	0
1	Mukund Sasikumar (IND)	1				1	0
1	Filip Peliwo (POL)	1				1	0
1	Jack Pinnington Jones (GBR)	1				1	0
1	David Poljak (CZE)	1				1	0
1	Savva Polukhin	1				1	0
1	Santiago Rodríguez Taverna (ARG)	1				1	0
1	Kasidit Samrej (THA)	1				1	0
1	Jelle Sels (NED)	1				1	0
1	Alexander Shevchenko	1				1	0
1	Keegan Smith (USA)	1				1	0
1	Khumoyun Sultanov (UZB)	1				1	0
1	Yasutaka Uchiyama (JPN)	1				1	0
1	Máté Valkusz (HUN)	1				1	0
1	Gonzalo Villanueva (ARG)	1				1	0
1	Émilien Voisin (FRA)	1				1	0
1	Arthur Weber (FRA)	1				1	0
1	Wu Tung-lin (TPE)	1				1	0
1	Bor Artnak (SLO)			1		1	0
1	Riccardo Balzerani (ITA)			1		1	0
1	Peter Bertran (DOM)			1		1	0
1	Leo Borg (SWE)			1		1	0
1	Gage Brymer (USA)			1		1	0
1	Daniele Capecchi (ITA)			1		1	0
1	Lucas Catarina (MON)			1		1	0
1	Jan Choinski (GBR)			1		1	0
1	Paweł Ciaś (POL)			1		1	0
1	Tibo Colson (BEL)			1		1	0
1	Francisco Comesaña (ARG)			1		1	0
1	Sean Cuenin (FRA)			1		1	0
1	Rrezart Cungu (MNE)			1		1	0
1	Miguel Damas (ESP)			1		1	0
1	Guy den Ouden (NED)			1		1	0
1	Matteo Donati (ITA)			1		1	0
1	Nino Ehrenschneider (GER)			1		1	0
1	Yankı Erel (TUR)			1		1	0
1	Péter Fajta (HUN)			1		1	0
1	Giovanni Fonio (ITA)			1		1	0
1	Nicolae Frunză (ROU)			1		1	0
1	Vilius Gaubas (LTU)			1		1	0
1	Tom Gentzsch (GER)			1		1	0
1	Matteo Gigante (ITA)			1		1	0
1	Joshua Goodger (GBR)			1		1	0
1	Christopher Heyman (BEL)			1		1	0
1	Roko Horvat (CRO)			1		1	0
1	Filip Cristian Jianu (ROU)			1		1	0
1	David Jordà Sanchis (ESP)			1		1	0
1	Duje Kekez (CRO)			1		1	0
1	Dayne Kelly (AUS)			1		1	0
1	Yuta Kikuchi (JPN)			1		1	0
1	Nicolas Kobelt (SUI)			1		1	0
1	Omni Kumar (USA)			1		1	0
1	Lee Duck-hee (KOR)			1		1	0
1	Călin Manda (ROU)			1		1	0
1	Manuel Mazza (ITA)			1		1	0
1	Daniel Merida (ESP)			1		1	0
1	Elmer Møller (DEN)			1		1	0
1	Hazem Naw (SYR)			1		1	0
1	Ivan Nedelko			1		1	0
1	Kiranpal Pannu (NZL)			1		1	0
1	Francesco Passaro (ITA)			1		1	0
1	Martyn Pawelski (POL)			1		1	0
1	Sebastian Prechtel (GER)			1		1	0
1	Sidharth Rawat (IND)			1		1	0
1	Max Hans Rehberg (GER)			1		1	0
1	Sam Riffice (USA)			1		1	0
1	Pedro Ródenas (ESP)			1		1	0
1	Nikolás Sánchez Izquierdo (ESP)			1		1	0
1	Shang Juncheng (CHN)			1		1	0
1	Sahar Simon (ISR)			1		1	0
1	Digvijay Pratap Singh (IND)			1		1	0
1	Evgenii Tiurnev			1		1	0
1	Zura Tkemaladze (GEO)			1		1	0
1	Alexey Vatutin			1		1	0
1	José Francisco Vidal Azorín (ESP)			1		1	0
1	Enzo Wallart (FRA)			1		1	0
1	Wang Xiaofei (CHN)			1		1	0
1	Oscar Weightman (GBR)			1		1	0
1	Wu Yibing (CHN)			1		1	0
1	Sarp Ağabigün (TUR)		1			0	1
1	Zvonimir Babić (CRO)		1			0	1
1	Ruben Bemelmans (BEL)		1			0	1
1	Raúl Brancaccio (ITA)		1			0	1
1	Gijs Brouwer (NED)		1			0	1
1	William Bushamuka (USA)		1			0	1
1	Boris Butulija (SRB)		1			0	1
1	Matyáš Černý (CZE)		1			0	1
1	Duncan Chan (CAN)		1			0	1
1	Anirudh Chandrasekar (IND)		1			0	1
1	Congsup Congcar (THA)		1			0	1
1	Marco De Rossi (SMR)		1			0	1
1	Michal Dembek (POL)		1			0	1
1	Stefan Dostanic (USA)		1			0	1
1	Blake Ellis (AUS)		1			0	1
1	Sanjar Fayziev (UZB)		1			0	1
1	Omar Giacalone (ITA)		1			0	1
1	Daniil Glinka (EST)		1			0	1
1	Oscar José Gutierrez (BRA)		1			0	1
1	Andrew Harris (AUS)		1			0	1
1	Gustavo Heide (BRA)		1			0	1
1	Calvin Hemery (FRA)		1			0	1
1	Philip Henning (RSA)		1			0	1
1	Hua Runhao (CHN)		1			0	1
1	Dev Javia (IND)		1			0	1
1	Yeongseok Jeong (KOR)		1			0	1
1	Markos Kalovelonis (GRE)		1			0	1
1	Yuhei Kono (JPN)		1			0	1
1	Yusuke Kusuhara (JPN)		1			0	1
1	Tristan Lamasine (FRA)		1			0	1
1	Martim Leote Prata (POR)		1			0	1
1	Daniel Little (GBR)		1			0	1
1	Álex Martínez (ESP)		1			0	1
1	Anton Matusevich (GBR)		1			0	1
1	Yannick Mertens (BEL)		1			0	1
1	Luka Mikrut (CRO)		1			0	1
1	Giovanni Mpetshi Perricard (FRA)		1			0	1
1	Mariano Navone (ARG)		1			0	1
1	Maximilian Neuchrist (AUT)		1			0	1
1	Dennis Novikov (USA)		1			0	1
1	Jannik Opitz (GER)		1			0	1
1	Stuart Parker (GBR)		1			0	1
1	Jakub Paul (SUI)		1			0	1
1	Alfredo Perez (USA)		1			0	1
1	Peter Polansky (CAN)		1			0	1
1	Vijay Sundar Prashanth (IND)		1			0	1
1	Dominik Reček (CZE)		1			0	1
1	João Lucas Reis da Silva (BRA)		1			0	1
1	Keegan Rice (CAN)		1			0	1
1	Filippo Romano (ITA)		1			0	1
1	Karl Kiur Saar (EST)		1			0	1
1	Philip Sekulic (AUS)		1			0	1
1	Rubin Statham (NZL)		1			0	1
1	Maik Steiner (GER)		1			0	1
1	Tyler Stewart (USA)		1			0	1
1	Adam Taylor (AUS)		1			0	1
1	Aristotelis Thanos (GRE)		1			0	1
1	Marko Topo (GER)		1			0	1
1	Joe Tyler (GBR)		1			0	1
1	Mark Vervoort (NED)		1			0	1
1	Beibit Zhukayev (KAZ)		1			0	1
1	Christos Antonopoulos (GRE)				1	0	1
1	Pedro Araújo (POR)				1	0	1
1	Boris Arias (BOL)				1	0	1
1	Erik Arutiunian				1	0	1
1	Demetris Azoides (GRE)				1	0	1
1	Philip Bachmaier (AUT)				1	0	1
1	Aleksandre Bakshi (GEO)				1	0	1
1	Gianluca Ballotta (PER)				1	0	1
1	Jiří Barnat (CZE)				1	0	1
1	Božo Barun (CRO)				1	0	1
1	Nishesh Basavareddy (USA)				1	0	1
1	Alessio Basile (BEL)				1	0	1
1	Filip Bergevi (SWE)				1	0	1
1	Alexandr Binda				1	0	1
1	Adrian Bodmer (SUI)				1	0	1
1	Gabi Adrian Boitan (ROU)				1	0	1
1	Jacob Brumm (USA)				1	0	1
1	Edas Butvilas (LTU)				1	0	1
1	Juan Pablo Cañas García (ESP)				1	0	1
1	Luca Castelnuovo (SUI)				1	0	1
1	Niccolo Catini (ITA)				1	0	1
1	Nick Chappell (USA)				1	0	1
1	Shohei Chikami (JPN)				1	0	1
1	Loic Cloes (BEL)				1	0	1
1	Ethan Cook (AUS)				1	0	1
1	Martín Cuevas (URU)				1	0	1
1	Savriyan Danilov				1	0	1
1	Jesse de Jager (NED)				1	0	1
1	Jake Delaney (AUS)				1	0	1
1	Ivan Denisov				1	0	1
1	S D Prajwal Dev (IND)				1	0	1
1	Dylan Dietrich (SUI)				1	0	1
1	Matic Dimic (SLO)				1	0	1
1	Gabriel Donev (BUL)				1	0	1
1	Dong Bohua (CHN)				1	0	1
1	Liam Draxl (CAN)				1	0	1
1	Filip Duda (CZE)				1	0	1
1	Menelaos Efstathiou (CYP)				1	0	1
1	Franco Emanuel Egea (ARG)				1	0	1
1	Akram El Sallaly (EGY)				1	0	1
1	Tomas Farjat (ARG)				1	0	1
1	Jesse Flores (CRC)				1	0	1
1	Luis Francisco (ESP)				1	0	1
1	Buvaysar Gadamauri (BEL)				1	0	1
1	Anthony Genov (BUL)				1	0	1
1	Igor Gimenez (BRA)				1	0	1
1	Álvaro Guillén Meza (ECU)				1	0	1
1	Svyatoslav Gulin				1	0	1
1	Cleeve Harper (CAN)				1	0	1
1	Hunter Heck (USA)				1	0	1
1	Gabriel Alejandro Hidalgo (ARG)				1	0	1
1	Taisei Ichikawa (JPN)				1	0	1
1	Masamichi Imamura (JPN)				1	0	1
1	Paul Inchauspe (FRA)				1	0	1
1	Simon Anthony Ivanov (BUL)				1	0	1
1	Jan Jermář (CZE)				1	0	1
1	Tomislav Jotovski (MKD)				1	0	1
1	Viktor Jović (SRB)				1	0	1
1	Admir Kalender (CRO)				1	0	1
1	Kazuma Kawachi (JPN)				1	0	1
1	Gengo Kikuchi (JPN)				1	0	1
1	Denis Klok				1	0	1
1	Toby Kodat (USA)				1	0	1
1	Vladimir Korolev				1	0	1
1	Marc Othman Ktiri (ESP)				1	0	1
1	Igor Kudriashov				1	0	1
1	Pranav Kumar (USA)				1	0	1
1	Alex Kuperstein (USA)				1	0	1
1	Bruno Kuzuhara (USA)				1	0	1
1	Raphael Lambling (FRA)				1	0	1
1	Edan Leshem (ISR)				1	0	1
1	Christopher Li (PER)				1	0	1
1	Li Majun (CHN)				1	0	1
1	Li Zhe (CHN)				1	0	1
1	Jack Loutit (NZL)				1	0	1
1	Karim-Mohamed Maamoun (EGY)				1	0	1
1	Alexander Maggs (GBR)				1	0	1
1	Jody Maginley (ATG)				1	0	1
1	Alejandro Manzanera Pertusa (ESP)				1	0	1
1	Louroi Martinez (SUI)				1	0	1
1	Mateo Nicolás Martínez (ARG)				1	0	1
1	Pablo Masjuan Ginel (ESP)				1	0	1
1	Alejandro Mendoza (BOL)				1	0	1
1	Michał Mikuła (POL)				1	0	1
1	Yanaki Milev (BUL)				1	0	1
1	Antoine Monaco (FRA)				1	0	1
1	Finn Murgett (GBR)				1	0	1
1	Bryce Nakashima (USA)				1	0	1
1	Petr Nesterov (BUL)				1	0	1
1	Patrik Niklas-Salminen (FIN)				1	0	1
1	Gabriele Maria Noce (ITA)				1	0	1
1	Egor Noskin				1	0	1
1	Osgar O'Hoisin (IRL)				1	0	1
1	Juan Sebastián Osorio (COL)				1	0	1
1	Daniil Ostapenkov				1	0	1
1	Carl Emil Overbeck (DEN)				1	0	1
1	David Pérez Sanz (ESP)				1	0	1
1	Evgeny Philippov				1	0	1
1	Gabriele Piraino (ITA)				1	0	1
1	Davide Pontoglio (ITA)				1	0	1
1	Nathan Ponwith (USA)				1	0	1
1	Stefan Popović (SRB)				1	0	1
1	Jan Pučálka (CZE)				1	0	1
1	Strahinja Rakić (SRB)				1	0	1
1	Maxim Ratniuk				1	0	1
1	Amaury Raynel (FRA)				1	0	1
1	Alexandre Reco (FRA)				1	0	1
1	Rishi Reddy (IND)				1	0	1
1	Stefano Reitano (ITA)				1	0	1
1	Patrik Rikl (CZE)				1	0	1
1	Lorenzo Joaquín Rodríguez (ARG)				1	0	1
1	Ricardo Rodríguez-Pace (VEN)				1	0	1
1	Alen Rogić Hadžalić (CRO)				1	0	1
1	Franco Roncadelli (URU)				1	0	1
1	Gabriel Roveri Sidney (BRA)				1	0	1
1	Antonio Šančić (CRO)				1	0	1
1	Pietro Schiavetti (ITA)				1	0	1
1	Maxim Shin (UZB)				1	0	1
1	Mehluli Don Ayanda Sibanda (ZIM)				1	0	1
1	Benjamin Sigouin (CAN)				1	0	1
1	Gorazd Srbljak (MKD)				1	0	1
1	Hamish Stewart (GBR)				1	0	1
1	Roland Stuurman (NED)				1	0	1
1	Sun Qian (CHN)				1	0	1
1	Giorgio Tabacco (ITA)				1	0	1
1	Kristjan Tamm (EST)				1	0	1
1	Louis Tessa (FRA)				1	0	1
1	Learner Tien (USA)				1	0	1
1	Dan Alexandru Tomescu (ROU)				1	0	1
1	Chang-Lin Tsai (TPE)				1	0	1
1	Mike Urbanija (SLO)				1	0	1
1	Matěj Vocel (CZE)				1	0	1
1	Jeffrey von der Schulenburg (SUI)				1	0	1
1	Semen Voronin				1	0	1
1	Wang Aoran (CHN)				1	0	1
1	Cooper Williams (USA)				1	0	1
1	Jesse Witten (USA)				1	0	1
1	Paul Wörner (GER)				1	0	1
1	Jumpei Yamasaki (JPN)				1	0	1
1	Jimmy Yang (GER)				1	0	1
1	Yang Tsung-hua (TPE)				1	0	1
1	Federico Zeballos (BOL)				1	0	1
1	Leopold Zima (GER)				1	0	1

=== Titles won by nation ===
2022 Titles won by nation

Total	Nation	M25		M15		Total	
Total	Nation	S	D	S	D	S	D
85	France (FRA)	27	17	19	22	46	39
78	United States (USA)	13	14	17	34	30	48
69	Great Britain (GBR)	12	27	9	21	21	48
66	Italy (ITA)	6	11	28	21	34	32
60	Spain (ESP)	17	12	15	16	32	28
60	Australia (AUS)	16	18	12	14	28	32
58	Germany (GER)	8	18	13	19	21	37
56	Japan (JPN)	10	14	12	20	22	34
42	Czech Republic (CZE)	12	9	7	14	19	23
38	Argentina (ARG)	9	5	11	13	20	18
31	Austria (AUT)	2	12	5	12	7	24
30	Ukraine (UKR)	6	5	5	14	11	19
27	China (CHN)	2	4	10	11	12	15
26	Belgium (BEL)	7	2	11	6	18	8
26	Netherlands (NED)	2	9	7	8	9	17
25	Romania (ROU)	3	5	7	10	10	15
25	India (IND)	1	5	5	14	6	19
24	Tunisia (TUN)	5	3	7	9	12	12
22	Chinese Taipei (TPE)	5	10		7	5	17
21	Poland (POL)	5	1	5	10	10	11
19	Brazil (BRA)	5	4	5	5	10	9
19	South Korea (KOR)	1	5	6	7	7	12
18	Sweden (SWE)		3	10	5	10	8
16	Switzerland (SUI)	3	4	3	6	6	10
15	Croatia (CRO)		6	6	3	6	9
13	Israel (ISR)	2	5	4	2	6	7
13	Bulgaria (BUL)		1	4	8	4	9
12	Canada (CAN)	1	3	1	7	2	10
12	Denmark (DEN)		5	2	5	2	10
11	Bolivia (BOL)		3	5	3	5	6
11	Peru (PER)		4	3	4	3	8
11	Thailand (THA)	1	2	1	7	2	9
10	New Zealand (NZL)		1	2	7	2	8
9	Moldova (MDA)		3	3	3	3	6
8	Portugal (POR)		3	3	2	3	5
8	Latvia (LAT)		4	2	2	2	6
8	Greece (GRE)		5	1	2	1	7
7	Russia (RUS) (Note: From 1 March, titles won by Russian players will not be counted towards Russia's tally.)	1	1	4	1	5	2
7	South Africa (RSA)		2	3	2	3	4
6	Vietnam (VIE)	1		4	1	5	1
6	Serbia (SRB)	1	1	2	2	3	3
6	Morocco (MAR)	1		1	4	2	4
6	Kazakhstan (KAZ)	1	3		2	1	5
5	Dominican Republic (DOM)	3		2		5	0
5	Hungary (HUN)	2		3		5	0
5	Estonia (EST)	1	1	2	1	3	2
5	Georgia (GEO)			3	2	3	2
5	North Macedonia (MKD)			3	2	3	2
5	Uzbekistan (UZB)	2	1		2	2	3
5	Luxembourg (LUX)		1	2	2	2	3
5	Zimbabwe (ZIM)	1	2		2	1	4
5	Ecuador (ECU)		2	1	2	1	4
5	Finland (FIN)		1		4	0	5
5	Slovakia (SVK)		1		4	0	5
4	Chile (CHI)	2		2		4	0
4	Monaco (MON)	1		3		4	0
4	Ivory Coast (CIV)		1	3		3	1
4	Lebanon (LBN)	2	1		1	2	2
4	Colombia (COL)	1		1	2	2	2
4	Northern Mariana Islands (NMI)		3		1	0	4
3	Jordan (JOR)			3		3	0
3	Turkey (TUR)	1	1	1		2	1
3	Philippines (PHI)		2		1	0	3
3	Egypt (EGY)				3	0	3
3	Paraguay (PAR)				3	0	3
2	Lithuania (LTU)			1	1	1	1
2	Slovenia (SLO)			1	1	1	1
2	Belarus (BLR) (Note: From 1 March, titles won by Belorussian players will not be counted towards Belarus' tally.)		2			0	2
2	Hong Kong (HKG)		1		1	0	2
2	Ghana (GHA)				2	0	2
2	Uruguay (URU)				2	0	2
1	Bosnia and Herzegovina (BIH)	1				1	0
1	Montenegro (MNE)			1		1	0
1	Syria (SYR)			1		1	0
1	San Marino (SMR)		1			0	1
1	Antigua and Barbuda (ATG)				1	0	1
1	Costa Rica (CRC)				1	0	1
1	Cyprus (CYP)				1	0	1
1	Ireland (IRL)				1	0	1
1	Venezuela (VEN)				1	0	1

== See also ==
- 2022 ATP Tour
- 2022 ATP Challenger Tour
- 2022 ITF Women's World Tennis Tour
