= 2025 Royan Atlantique Open – Singles =

Singles
- 2025 Royan Atlantique Open

Final
- Champion: (France) Titouan Droguet
- Runner-up: (Bulgaria) Dimitar Kuzmanov
- Score: 4–6, 6–1, 6–4

Events
Singles	Doubles
- Royan Atlantique Open

This was the first edition of the tournament since 1981.

Titouan Droguet won the title after defeating Dimitar Kuzmanov 4–6, 6–1, 6–4 in the final.

== Seeds ==
1. (France) Calvin Hemery (second round)
2. (France) Titouan Droguet (champion)
3. (France) Clément Tabur (first round)
4. (Chinese Taipei) Hsu Yu-hsiou (first round)
5. (Bulgaria) Dimitar Kuzmanov (final)
6. (France) Mathys Erhard (second round)
7. Ivan Gakhov (second round)
8. (Spain) Daniel Mérida (semifinals)

== Draw ==
Key

- Q = Qualifier
- WC = Wild card
- LL = Lucky loser
- Alt = Alternate
- ITF = ITF entry
- PR = Protected ranking
- SR = Special ranking
- SE = Special exempt
- JE = Junior exempt
- JR = Junior Accelerator Programme entrant
- CO = College Accelerator Programme entrant
- NG = Next Gen Accelerator Program entrant
- w/o = Walkover
- r = Retired
- d = Defaulted

=== Finals ===
Semifinals
5	(Bulgaria) Dimitar Kuzmanov	4	6	6
(Switzerland) Mika Brunold	6	3	4
8	(Spain) Daniel Mérida	6^{4}	2
2	(France) Titouan Droguet	7^{7}	6

Final
5	(Bulgaria) Dimitar Kuzmanov	6	1	4
2	(France) Titouan Droguet	4	6	6

=== Top half ===
First round
1	(France) C Hemery	6	6
PR	(Germany) C-M Stebe	2	3
(Romania) GA Boitan	6	3	4
WC	(France) E Couacaud	3	6	6
(Slovakia) N Gombos	1	3
PR	(North Macedonia) K Ivanovski	6	6
Q	(France) L Poullain	3	6^{3}
5	(Bulgaria) D Kuzmanov	6	7^{7}
4	(Chinese Taipei) Y-h Hsu	4	5
(Switzerland) M Brunold	6	7
WC	(France) T Faurel	6^{2}	6	6^{4}
Q	(France) T Paris	7^{7}	3	7^{7}
Q	(Spain) A Santamarta Roig	6	6^{4}	7^{10}
(Spain) Àlex Martí Pujolràs	4	7^{7}	6^{8}
Q	(France) T Papamalamis	4	2
7	I Gakhov	6	6

Second round
1	(France) C Hemery	4	6^{5}
WC	(France) E Couacaud	6	7^{7}
PR	(North Macedonia) K Ivanovski	6	3	3
5	(Bulgaria) D Kuzmanov	4	6	6
(Switzerland) M Brunold	7	6
Q	(France) T Paris	5	3
Q	(Spain) A Santamarta Roig	3	6	7^{8}
7	I Gakhov	6	2	6^{6}

Quarterfinals
WC	(France) E Couacaud	4	1
5	(Bulgaria) D Kuzmanov	6	6
(Switzerland) M Brunold	6	6
Q	(Spain) A Santamarta Roig	4	3

Semifinals
5	(Bulgaria) D Kuzmanov	4	6	6
(Switzerland) M Brunold	6	3	4

=== Bottom half ===
First round
8	(Spain) D Mérida	6^{5}	7	7
(Croatia) M Dodig	7^{7}	5	5
Q	(Spain) M Alcalá Gurri	6	4	3
(France) F Bax	2	6	6
WC	(France) B Paire	5	6^{5}
Q	(Belgium) B Gadamauri	7	7^{7}
NG	(Switzerland) K Feldbausch	6	6
3	(France) C Tabur	2	3
6	(France) Mathys Erhard	7^{7}	7
(Jordan) A Shelbayh	6^{5}	5
(Spain) J Barranco Cosano	6^{8}	3
(Croatia) L Mikrut	7^{10}	6
(France) A Géa	6^{2}	6	6
(Latvia) R Strombachs	7^{7}	1	1
(Spain) N Sánchez Izquierdo	1	2
2	(France) T Droguet	6	6

Second round
8	(Spain) D Mérida	7	6
(France) F Bax	5	2
Q	(Belgium) B Gadamauri	3	1
NG	(Switzerland) K Feldbausch	6	6
6	(France) M Erhard	3	4
(Croatia) L Mikrut	6	6
(France) A Géa	6	1	3
2	(France) T Droguet	4	6	6

Quarterfinals
8	(Spain) D Mérida	7	6
NG	(Switzerland) K Feldbausch	5	3
(Croatia) L Mikrut	6^{1}	7^{9}	4
2	(France) T Droguet	7^{7}	6^{7}	6

Semifinals
8	(Spain) D Mérida	6^{4}	2
2	(France) T Droguet	7^{7}	6
