= 2026 Royan Atlantique Open =

- Date: 15 – 20 June
- Surface: Clay
- Location: Royan, France

Champions

Singles
- (Spain) Max Alcalá Gurri

Doubles
- (Netherlands) Daniel de Jonge / (Germany) Jannik Opitz
- Royan Atlantique Open

The 2026 Royan Atlantique Open was a professional tennis tournament played on clay courts. It was the second edition of the tournament since returning to the tennis schedule after an absence of over 40 years (since 1981). It was part of the 2026 ATP Challenger Tour. It took place in Royan, France from 15 to 20 June 2026.

== Singles main-draw entrants ==
=== Seeds ===
Country	Player	Rank^{1}	Seed
BEL	Gilles-Arnaud Bailly	208	1
ESP	Alejandro Moro Cañas	236	2
	Pavel Kotov	248	3
RSA	Philip Henning	250	4
ESP	Max Alcalá Gurri	275	5
FRA	Calvin Hemery	276	6
FRA	Robin Bertrand	286	7
SUI	Kilian Feldbausch	287	8

- ^{1} Rankings are as of 8 June 2026.

=== Other entrants ===
The following players received wildcards into the singles main draw:

- (France) Pierre Delage
- (France) Daniel Jade
- (France) Leo Raquillet

The following player received entry into the singles main draw through the Junior Accelerator programme:

- (Spain) Andrés Santamarta Roig

The following players received entry into the singles main draw as alternates:

- (France) Felix Balshaw
- Svyatoslav Gulin
- (France) Maxime Janvier
- (France) Laurent Lokoli
- (France) Raphael Perot
- (Argentina) Lucio Ratti

The following players received entry from the qualifying draw:

- (South Korea) Gerard Campaña Lee
- (Belgium) Émilien Demanet
- (Argentina) Franco Ribero
- (France) Cosme Rolland de Ravel
- (Japan) Ryo Tabata
- (United States) Michael Zhu

== Champions ==
=== Singles ===
- (Spain) Max Alcalá Gurri def. (France) Cosme Rolland de Ravel 7–6^{(7–4)}, 6–1.

=== Doubles ===
- (Netherlands) Daniel de Jonge / (Germany) Jannik Opitz def. (Spain) Ignasi Forcano / (Netherlands) Mark Vervoort 6–4, 6–4.
