= 2025 Royan Atlantique Open – Doubles =

Doubles
- 2025 Royan Atlantique Open

Final
- Champions: (Croatia) Matej Dodig (Croatia) Nino Serdarušić
- Runners-up: (India) Adil Kalyanpur (India) Parikshit Somani
- Score: 7–5, 6–7^{(4–7)}, [12–10]

Events
Singles	Doubles
- Royan Atlantique Open

This was the first edition of the tournament since 1981.

Matej Dodig and Nino Serdarušić won the title after defeating Adil Kalyanpur and Parikshit Somani 7–5, 6–7^{(4–7)}, [12–10] in the final.

== Seeds ==
1. (Zimbabwe) Courtney John Lock / (Netherlands) Thijmen Loof (quarterfinals)
2. (Netherlands) Mats Hermans / (Chinese Taipei) Hsu Yu-hsiou (quarterfinals)
3. (Bulgaria) Anthony Genov / (Czech Republic) Jan Jermář (first round)
4. (Italy) Simone Agostini / (Spain) Mario Mansilla Díez (first round)

== Draw ==
Key

- Q = Qualifier
- WC = Wild card
- LL = Lucky loser
- Alt = Alternate
- ITF = ITF entry
- PR = Protected ranking
- SR = Special ranking
- SE = Special exempt
- JE = Junior exempt
- JR = Junior Accelerator Programme entrant
- CO = College Accelerator Programme entrant
- NG = Next Gen Accelerator Program entrant
- w/o = Walkover
- r = Retired
- d = Defaulted

=== Draw ===
First round
1	(Zimbabwe) CJ Lock (Netherlands) T Loof	6	7^{7}
WC	(France) Pierre Delage (France) Louis Dussin	0	6^{4}
E Agafonov; Maxim Zhukov	2	6	[10]
(Brazil) Gabriel Roveri Sidney (Colombia) A Urrea	6	2	[7]
4	(Italy) Simone Agostini (Spain) M Mansilla Díez	6	3	[5]
(India) A Kalyanpur (India) Parikshit Somani	0	6	[10]
(United Kingdom) Liam Hignett (United Kingdom) J MacKinlay	3	3
(Spain) M Alcalá Gurri (Spain) N Sánchez Izquierdo	6	6
(Croatia) M Dodig (Croatia) N Serdarušić	6	6
(Georgia (country)) A Bakshi (Latvia) R Strombachs	3	4
I Gakhov; D Golubev	5	7^{7}	[10]
3	(Bulgaria) A Genov (Czech Republic) J Jermář	7	6^{5}	[6]
(Italy) F Agamenone (Switzerland) K Feldbausch	2	4
WC	(France) Maxence Beaugé (France) Lucas Bouquet	6	6
(Spain) Rafael Izquierdo Luque (Spain) Iván Marrero Curbelo	3	7^{7}	[5]
2	(Netherlands) M Hermans (Chinese Taipei) Y-h Hsu	6	6^{3}	[10]

Quarterfinals
1	(Zimbabwe) CJ Lock (Netherlands) T Loof	4	6^{6}
E Agafonov; M Zhukov	6	7^{8}
(India) A Kalyanpur (India) P Somani	6	7^{7}
(Spain) M Alcalá Gurri (Spain) N Sánchez Izquierdo	3	6^{3}
(Croatia) M Dodig (Croatia) N Serdarušić	7^{7}	6
I Gakhov; D Golubev	6^{5}	1
WC	(France) M Beaugé (France) L Bouquet	6	6
2	(Netherlands) M Hermans (Chinese Taipei) Y-h Hsu	3	4

Semifinals
E Agafonov; M Zhukov	6	4	[5]
(India) A Kalyanpur (India) P Somani	1	6	[10]
(Croatia) M Dodig (Croatia) N Serdarušić	6	6
WC	(France) M Beaugé (France) L Bouquet	3	3

Final
(India) A Kalyanpur (India) P Somani	5	7^{7}	[10]
(Croatia) M Dodig (Croatia) N Serdarušić	7	6^{4}	[12]
