= 2025 Royan Atlantique Open =

- Date: 16 – 21 June
- Surface: Clay
- Location: Royan, France

Champions

Singles
- (France) Titouan Droguet

Doubles
- (Croatia) Matej Dodig / (Croatia) Nino Serdarušić
- Royan Atlantique Open

The 2025 Royan Atlantique Open was a professional tennis tournament played on clay courts. It was the first edition of the tournament since returning to the tennis schedule after an absence of over 40 years (since 1981). It was part of the 2025 ATP Challenger Tour. It took place in Royan, France from 16 to 21 June 2025.

== Singles main-draw entrants ==
=== Seeds ===
| Country | Player | Rank^{1} | Seed |
|---|---|---|---|
| FRA | Calvin Hemery | 168 | 1 |
| FRA | Titouan Droguet | 222 | 2 |
| FRA | Clément Tabur | 234 | 3 |
| TPE | Hsu Yu-hsiou | 251 | 4 |
| BUL | Dimitar Kuzmanov | 263 | 5 |
| FRA | Mathys Erhard | 269 | 6 |
| | Ivan Gakhov | 270 | 7 |
| ESP | Daniel Mérida | 292 | 8 |

- ^{1} Rankings are as of 9 June 2025.

=== Other entrants ===
The following players received wildcards into the singles main draw:

- (France) Enzo Couacaud
- (France) Thomas Faurel
- (France) Benoît Paire

The following players received entry into the singles main draw using protected rankings:

- (North Macedonia) Kalin Ivanovski
- (Germany) Cedrik-Marcel Stebe

The following player received entry into the singles main draw through the Next Gen Accelerator programme:

- (Switzerland) Kilian Feldbausch

The following players received entry from the qualifying draw:

- (Spain) Max Alcalá Gurri
- (Belgium) Buvaysar Gadamauri
- (France) Théo Papamalamis
- (France) Tom Paris
- (France) Lucas Poullain
- (Spain) Andrés Santamarta Roig

== Champions ==
=== Singles ===
- (France) Titouan Droguet def. (Bulgaria) Dimitar Kuzmanov 4–6, 6–1, 6–4.

=== Doubles ===
- (Croatia) Matej Dodig / (Croatia) Nino Serdarušić def. (India) Adil Kalyanpur / (India) Parikshit Somani 7–5, 6–7^{(4–7)}, [12–10].
