= 2026 Royan Atlantique Open – Singles =

Singles
- 2026 Royan Atlantique Open

Final
- Champion: (Spain) Max Alcalá Gurri
- Runner-up: (France) Cosme Rolland de Ravel
- Score: 7–6^{(7–4)}, 6–1

Events
Singles	Doubles
- Royan Atlantique Open

Titouan Droguet was the defending champion but chose not to defend his title.

Max Alcalá Gurri won the title after defeating Cosme Rolland de Ravel 7–6^{(7–4)}, 6–1 in the final.

== Seeds ==
1. (Belgium) Gilles-Arnaud Bailly (second round)
2. (Spain) Alejandro Moro Cañas (first round)
3. Pavel Kotov (second round, retired)
4. (South Africa) Philip Henning (first round)
5. (Spain) Max Alcalá Gurri (champion)
6. (France) Calvin Hemery (first round, retired)
7. (France) Robin Bertrand (first round)
8. (Switzerland) Kilian Feldbausch (semifinals)

== Draw ==
Key

- Q = Qualifier
- WC = Wild card
- LL = Lucky loser
- Alt = Alternate
- ITF = ITF entry
- PR = Protected ranking
- SR = Special ranking
- SE = Special exempt
- JE = Junior exempt
- JR = Junior Accelerator Programme entrant
- CO = College Accelerator Programme entrant
- NG = Next Gen Accelerator Program entrant
- w/o = Walkover
- r = Retired
- d = Defaulted

=== Finals ===
Semifinals
Q	(France) Cosme Rolland de Ravel	6	7^{7}
Alt	(Argentina) Lucio Ratti	1	6^{5}
8	(Switzerland) Kilian Feldbausch	3	2
5	(Spain) Max Alcalá Gurri	6	6

Final
Q	(France) Cosme Rolland de Ravel	6^{4}	1
5	(Spain) Max Alcalá Gurri	7^{7}	6

=== Top half ===
First round
1	(Belgium) GA Bailly	7	6
(France) L Poullain	5	2
Q	(France) Cosme Rolland de Ravel	2	6	6
(France) G Blancaneaux	6	3	3
WC	(France) Daniel Jade	4	6	6
Q	(United States) Michael Zhu	6	2	3
Alt	(France) Raphael Perot	7^{9}	7
7	(France) R Bertrand	6^{7}	5
4	(South Africa) P Henning	6	3	6^{3}
Q	(South Korea) G Campaña Lee	4	6	7^{7}
(Serbia) O Milić	4	4
(France) T Faurel	6	6
(Ivory Coast) E Coulibaly	1	6	1
Alt	(France) F Balshaw	6	3	6
Alt	(Argentina) Lucio Ratti	3	6	3
6	(France) C Hemery	6	1	0^{r}

Second round
1	(Belgium) GA Bailly	6	3	3
Q	(France) C Rolland de Ravel	4	6	6
WC	(France) D Jade	1	0
Alt	(France) R Perot	6	6
Q	(South Korea) G Campaña Lee	7	6
(France) T Faurel	5	4
Alt	(France) F Balshaw	6^{8}	6	1
Alt	(Argentina) L Ratti	7^{10}	2	6

Quarterfinals
Q	(France) C Rolland de Ravel	6	6
Alt	(France) R Perot	3	4
Q	(South Korea) G Campaña Lee	3	2
Alt	(Argentina) L Ratti	6	6

Semifinals
Q	(France) C Rolland de Ravel	6	7^{7}
Alt	(Argentina) L Ratti	1	6^{5}

=== Bottom half ===
First round
8	(Switzerland) K Feldbausch	6	6
Alt	(France) L Lokoli	2	4
WC	(France) Pierre Delage	1	6	1
Alt	Svyatoslav Gulin	6	3	6
WC	(France) Leo Raquillet	7	2	6
(India) M Dhamne	5	6	3
Q	(Argentina) F Ribero	7^{7}	3	0
3	P Kotov	6^{3}	6	6
5	(Spain) M Alcalá Gurri	7	6
JR	(Spain) A Santamarta Roig	5	1
(Turkey) Y Erel	7^{7}	3	6^{4}
Q	(Japan) Ryo Tabata	6^{3}	6	7^{7}
Alt	(France) M Janvier	4	1
Q	(Belgium) Émilien Demanet	6	6
(Spain) C Sánchez Jover	1	7^{7}	6
2	(Spain) A Moro Cañas	6	6^{2}	4

Second round
8	(Switzerland) K Feldbausch	6	6
Alt	S Gulin	4	3
WC	(France) L Raquillet	7	0
3	P Kotov	5	0^{r}
5	(Spain) M Alcalá Gurri	6	6
Q	(Japan) R Tabata	2	2
Q	(Belgium) É Demanet	7	6^{3}	4
(Spain) C Sánchez Jover	5	7^{7}	6

Quarterfinals
8	(Switzerland) K Feldbausch	6	6
WC	(France) L Raquillet	4	2
5	(Spain) M Alcalá Gurri	6	6^{3}	7
(Spain) C Sánchez Jover	2	7^{7}	5

Semifinals
8	(Switzerland) K Feldbausch	3	2
5	(Spain) M Alcalá Gurri	6	6
