= 2016 Adriatic Challenger – Doubles =

Doubles
- 2016 Adriatic Challenger

Final
- Champion: (Italy) Riccardo Ghedin (Italy) Alessandro Motti
- Runner-up: (Austria) Lucas Miedler (Netherlands) Mark Vervoort
- Score: 6–4, 6–4

Events
Singles	Doubles
Adriatic Challenger

This was the first edition of the tournament.

Riccardo Ghedin and Alessandro Motti won the title after defeating Lucas Miedler and Mark Vervoort 6–4, 6–4 in the final.

== Seeds ==
1. (Italy) Riccardo Ghedin / (Italy) Alessandro Motti (champions)
2. (Austria) Lucas Miedler / (Netherlands) Mark Vervoort (final)
3. (Spain) Gerard Granollers / (Netherlands) Antal van der Duim (first round)
4. (Peru) Sergio Galdós / (Chile) Nicolás Jarry (semifinals)

== Draw ==
=== Key ===
- Q = Qualifier
- WC = Wild card
- LL = Lucky loser
- Alt = Alternate
- SE = Special exempt
- PR = Protected ranking
- ITF = ITF entry
- JE = Junior exempt
- w/o = Walkover
- r = Retired
- d = Defaulted
- SR = Special ranking

First round
1	(Italy) R Ghedin (Italy) A Motti	6	6
WC	(Italy) Federico Bertuccioli (Italy) Filippo Stramigioli	4	2
Alt	(Colombia) DE Galán (Venezuela) R Rodríguez	4	2
(Australia) S de Waard (Germany) A Mies	6	6
3	(Spain) G Granollers (Netherlands) A van der Duim	3	4
(Belgium) G Gigounon (Italy) L Giustino	6	6
(Argentina) N Kicker (France) A Michon	3	6^{5}
(Argentina) A Collarini (Brazil) J Souza	6	7^{7}
WC	(Italy) Francisco Bahamonde (Italy) A Pellegrino	6	6^{5}	[10]
WC	(Italy) G Mager (Italy) L Sonego	3	7^{7}	[7]
(Russia) A Bublik (Slovakia) F Horanský	4	3
4	(Peru) S Galdós (Chile) N Jarry	6	6
PR	(Italy) A Brizzi (Italy) M Cecchinato	3	6^{4}
(Croatia) V Galović (Colombia) C Rodríguez	6	7^{7}
(Romania) C-I Gârd (Philippines) R Gonzales	4	4
2	(Austria) L Miedler (Netherlands) M Vervoort	6	6

Quarterfinals
1	(Italy) R Ghedin (Italy) A Motti	7	7
(Australia) S de Waard (Germany) A Mies	5	5
(Belgium) G Gigounon (Italy) L Giustino	3	3
(Argentina) A Collarini (Brazil) J Souza	6	6
WC	(Italy) F Bahamonde (Italy) A Pellegrino	4	0
4	(Peru) S Galdós (Chile) N Jarry	6	6
(Croatia) V Galović (Colombia) C Rodríguez	4	7	[5]
2	(Austria) L Miedler (Netherlands) M Vervoort	6	5	[10]

Semifinals
1	(Italy) R Ghedin (Italy) A Motti	w/o
(Argentina) A Collarini (Brazil) J Souza
4	(Peru) S Galdós (Chile) N Jarry	6^{5}	6	[9]
2	(Austria) L Miedler (Netherlands) M Vervoort	7^{7}	3	[11]

Final
1	(Italy) R Ghedin (Italy) A Motti	6	6
2	(Austria) L Miedler (Netherlands) M Vervoort	4	4
