= 2016 Adriatic Challenger =

- Date: 8–14 August
- Edition: 1st
- Surface: Clay
- Location: Fano, Italy

Champions

Singles
- (Brazil) João Souza

Doubles
- (Italy) Riccardo Ghedin / (Italy) Alessandro Motti
Adriatic Challenger

The 2016 Adriatic Challenger was a professional tennis tournament played on clay courts. It was the first edition of the tournament which was part of the 2016 ATP Challenger Tour. It took place in Fano, Italy from 8 to 14 August 2016.

== Singles main-draw entrants ==
=== Seeds ===
Country	Player	Rank	Seed
ESP	Roberto Carballés Baena	102	1
ITA	Marco Cecchinato	144	2
ARG	Nicolás Kicker	153	3
BRA	João Souza	163	4
CHI	Gonzalo Lama	166	5
BEL	Arthur De Greef	175	6
FRA	Mathias Bourgue	192	7
ITA	Andrea Arnaboldi	207	8

- ^{1} Rankings are as of August 1, 2016.

=== Other entrants ===
The following players received wildcards into the singles main draw:

- (Italy) Andrea Pellegrino
- (Italy) Francisco Bahamonde
- (Italy) Gianluigi Quinzi
- (Italy) Matteo Donati

The following player received entry into the singles main draw using a protected ranking:

- (Italy) Alberto Brizzi

The following players received entry from the qualifying draw:

- (Italy) Salvatore Caruso
- (Austria) Lucas Miedler
- (Italy) Alessandro Petrone
- (France) Sadio Doumbia

== Champions ==
=== Singles ===
- (Brazil) João Souza def. (Argentina) Nicolás Kicker, 6–4, 6–7^{(12–14)}, 6–2

=== Doubles ===
- (Italy) Riccardo Ghedin / (Italy) Alessandro Motti def. (Austria) Lucas Miedler / (Netherlands) Mark Vervoort, 6–4, 6–4
