= 2016 Adriatic Challenger – Singles =

Singles
- 2016 Adriatic Challenger

Final
- Champion: (Brazil) João Souza
- Runner-up: (Argentina) Nicolás Kicker
- Score: 6–4, 6–7^{(12–14)}, 6–2

Events
Singles	Doubles
Adriatic Challenger

This was the first edition of the tournament.

João Souza won the title after defeating Nicolás Kicker 6–4, 6–7^{(12–14)}, 6–2 in the final.

== Seeds ==
1. (Spain) Roberto Carballés Baena (first round)
2. (Italy) Marco Cecchinato (first round)
3. (Argentina) Nicolás Kicker (final)
4. (Brazil) João Souza (champion)
5. (Chile) Gonzalo Lama (quarterfinals)
6. (Belgium) Arthur De Greef (second round)
7. (France) Mathias Bourgue (first round)
8. (Italy) Andrea Arnaboldi (first round, retired)

== Draw ==
=== Key ===
- Q = Qualifier
- WC = Wild card
- LL = Lucky loser
- Alt = Alternate
- SE = Special exempt
- PR = Protected ranking
- ITF = ITF entry
- JE = Junior exempt
- w/o = Walkover
- r = Retired
- d = Defaulted
- SR = Special ranking

=== Finals ===
Semifinals
Q	(Italy) Salvatore Caruso	3	4
4	(Brazil) João Souza	6	6
3	(Argentina) Nicolás Kicker	6	6
(France) Axel Michon	1	0

Final
4	(Brazil) João Souza	6	6^{12}	6
3	(Argentina) Nicolás Kicker	4	7^{14}	2

=== Top half ===
First round
1	(Spain) R Carballés Baena	2	5
WC	(Italy) A Pellegrino	6	7
(France) C Hemery	3	7^{7}	1
Q	(Italy) S Caruso	6	6^{3}	6
(Ukraine) A Smirnov	4	4
(Spain) G Granollers	6	6
WC	(Italy) Francisco Bahamonde	6	6
7	(France) M Bourgue	1	2
4	(Brazil) J Souza	6	6
(Netherlands) A van der Duim	1	4
Q	(Austria) L Miedler	7	2	4
Q	(Italy) Alessandro Petrone	5	6	6
Q	(France) S Doumbia	3	2
(Belgium) G Gigounon	6	6
PR	(Italy) A Brizzi	6^{7}	3
5	(Chile) G Lama	7^{9}	6

Second round
WC	(Italy) A Pellegrino	2	6	0
Q	(Italy) S Caruso	6	3	6
(Spain) G Granollers	6	4	0
WC	(Italy) F Bahamonde	2	6	6
4	(Brazil) J Souza	6	7
Q	(Italy) A Petrone	4	5
(Belgium) G Gigounon	6	4	1
5	(Chile) G Lama	4	6	6

Quarterfinals
Q	(Italy) S Caruso	7	6
WC	(Italy) F Bahamonde	5	4
4	(Brazil) J Souza	6	6
5	(Chile) G Lama	0	0

Semifinals
Q	(Italy) S Caruso	3	4
4	(Brazil) J Souza	6	6

=== Bottom half ===
First round
8	(Italy) A Arnaboldi	4	3^{r}
(Austria) B Trinker	6	4
(Italy) F Volandri	7	6
(Italy) Edoardo Eremin	5	4
(Italy) L Sonego	6	6
(Slovakia) F Horanský	0	1
WC	(Italy) G Quinzi	5	6	6^{1}
3	(Argentina) N Kicker	7	2	7^{7}
6	(Belgium) A De Greef	7	3
(Chile) C Garin	5	2^{r}
(Italy) L Giustino	4	6^{6}
WC	(Italy) M Donati	6	7^{8}
(Italy) G Mager	6	6
(Spain) D Pérez Sanz	1	3
(France) A Michon	7	6
2	(Italy) M Cecchinato	5	0

Second round
(Austria) B Trinker	2	2
(Italy) F Volandri	6	6
(Italy) L Sonego	3	6	1
3	(Argentina) N Kicker	6	2	6
6	(Belgium) A De Greef	4	2
WC	(Italy) M Donati	6	6
(Italy) G Mager	6	6^{8}	4
(France) A Michon	1	7^{10}	6

Quarterfinals
(Italy) F Volandri	2	1
3	(Argentina) N Kicker	6	6
WC	(Italy) M Donati	4	3
(France) A Michon	6	6

Semifinals
3	(Argentina) N Kicker	6	6
(France) A Michon	1	0
