= Jannik Opitz =

German tennis player (born 1998)

- Country (sports): Germany
- Born: 15 April 1998 (age 28) Hildesheim, Germany
- Height: 1.93 m (6 ft 4 in)
- Plays: Left-handed (two-handed backhand)
- College: Western Michigan
- Prize money: US $42,923

Singles
- Career record: 0–0 (at ATP Tour level, Grand Slam level, and in Davis Cup)
- Career titles: 0
- Highest ranking: No. 783 (19 October 2026)
- Current ranking: No. 783 (19 October 2026)

Doubles
- Career record: 0–0 (at ATP Tour level, Grand Slam level, and in Davis Cup)
- Career titles: 1 Challenger, 7 ITF
- Highest ranking: No. 204 (19 October 2026)
- Current ranking: No. 204 (19 October 2026)
- Last updated on: 19 October 2026.

Jannik Opitz (born 15 April 1998) is a German tennis player. Opitz has a career high ATP singles ranking of world No. 783 and a best doubles ranking of No. 204, both achieved on 19 October 2026.

He has won one ATP Challenger doubles title at the 2026 Royan Atlantique Open.

He played college tennis at Western Michigan.

== ATP Challenger finals ==
=== Doubles: 2 (1 title, 1 runner-up) ===
Finals by surface
Hard (0–0)
Clay (1–1)

Result	W–L	Date	Tournament	Surface	Partner	Opponents	Score
Win	1–0	Jun 2026	Royan Atlantique Open, France	Clay	(Netherlands) Daniel de Jonge	(Spain) Ignasi Forcano (Netherlands) Mark Vervoort	6–4, 6–4
Loss	1–1	Aug 2026	Hamburg Ladies & Gents Cup, Germany	Clay	(Germany) Niels McDonald	(Croatia) Admir Kalender (Croatia) Nino Serdarušić	3–6, 4–6
