= 2026 Plovdiv Challenger IV – Doubles =

Doubles
- 2026 Plovdiv Challenger IV

Final
- Champions: (Slovakia) Miloš Karol (Czech Republic) Andrew Paulson
- Runners-up: (Romania) Bogdan Pavel (Spain) Benjamín Winter López
- Score: 6–3, 6–4

Events
Singles	Doubles
- Plovdiv Challenger

Valerio Aboian and Juan Manuel La Serna were the defending champions but chose not to defend their title.

Miloš Karol and Andrew Paulson won the title after defeating Bogdan Pavel and Benjamín Winter López 6–3, 6–4 in the final.

== Seeds ==
1. (Slovakia) Miloš Karol / (Czech Republic) Andrew Paulson (champions)
2. (Romania) Bogdan Pavel / (Spain) Benjamín Winter López (final)
3. (Spain) Mario Mansilla Díez / (Portugal) Tiago Pereira (semifinals)
4. (Romania) Victor Vlad Cornea / (Austria) Maximilian Neuchrist (semifinals)

== Draw ==
Key

- Q = Qualifier
- WC = Wild card
- LL = Lucky loser
- Alt = Alternate
- ITF = ITF entry
- PR = Protected ranking
- SR = Special ranking
- SE = Special exempt
- JE = Junior exempt
- JR = Junior Accelerator Programme entrant
- CO = College Accelerator Programme entrant
- NG = Next Gen Accelerator Program entrant
- w/o = Walkover
- r = Retired
- d = Defaulted

First round
1	(Slovakia) M Karol (Czech Republic) A Paulson	6	6
(Italy) Tommaso Compagnucci (Sweden) Oliver Johansson	1	3
(Spain) O Roca Batalla (Spain) C Sánchez Jover	7^{7}	4	[10]
(France) G Blancaneaux (Belgium) M Geerts	6^{2}	6	[5]
4	(Romania) V Cornea (Austria) M Neuchrist	6	6
(France) C Hemery (Tunisia) S Mansouri	3	4
Alt	(Romania) Rareș Teodor Pieleanu (Japan) Ryo Tabata	6	6
WC	(Bulgaria) Maxim Khorozov (Bulgaria) Aleksandar Tolev	2	4
(Spain) M Alcalá Gurri (Spain) Imanol López Morillo	7^{7}	4	[10]
WC	(Bulgaria) I Ivanov (Bulgaria) Danial Spasov	6^{4}	6	[7]
(Bulgaria) A Genov (Germany) K Wehnelt	6^{4}	4
3	(Spain) M Mansilla Díez (Portugal) T Pereira	7^{7}	6
(Serbia) I Sabanov (Serbia) M Sabanov	7	6
(Bulgaria) Y Milev (Serbia) Stefan Popović	5	1
Andrey Chepelev (North Macedonia) O Prihodko	6^{4}	6^{2}
2	(Romania) B Pavel (Spain) B Winter López	7^{7}	7^{7}

Quarterfinals
1	(Slovakia) M Karol (Czech Republic) A Paulson	6	3	[10]
(Spain) O Roca Batalla (Spain) C Sánchez Jover	3	6	[5]
4	(Romania) V Cornea (Austria) M Neuchrist	6	1	[10]
Alt	(Romania) RT Pieleanu (Japan) R Tabata	4	6	[7]
(Spain) M Alcalá Gurri (Spain) I López Morillo	2	2
3	(Spain) M Mansilla Díez (Portugal) T Pereira	6	6
(Serbia) I Sabanov (Serbia) M Sabanov	6	3	[9]
2	(Romania) B Pavel (Spain) B Winter López	4	6	[11]

Semifinals
1	(Slovakia) M Karol (Czech Republic) A Paulson	6	3	[10]
4	(Romania) V Cornea (Austria) M Neuchrist	3	6	[6]
3	(Spain) M Mansilla Díez (Portugal) T Pereira	5	6	[7]
2	(Romania) B Pavel (Spain) B Winter López	7	4	[10]

Final
1	(Slovakia) M Karol (Czech Republic) A Paulson	6	6
2	(Romania) B Pavel (Spain) B Winter López	3	4
