= 2026 Plovdiv Challenger IV =

- Date: 21 – 27 September
- Edition: 4th
- Surface: Clay
- Location: Plovdiv, Bulgaria

Champions

Singles
- (Spain) Max Alcalá Gurri

Doubles
- (Slovakia) Miloš Karol / (Czech Republic) Andrew Paulson
- Plovdiv Challenger

The 2026 Plovdiv Challenger IV was a professional tennis tournament played on clay courts. It was the fourth edition of the tournament which was part of the 2026 ATP Challenger Tour. It took place in Plovdiv, Bulgaria between 21 and 27 September 2026.

== Singles main-draw entrants ==
=== Seeds ===
| Country | Player | Rank^{1} | Seed |
|---|---|---|---|
| ESP | Max Alcalá Gurri | 161 | 1 |
| AUT | Joel Schwärzler | 179 | 2 |
| GER | Diego Dedura | 188 | 3 |
| CZE | Maxim Mrva | 209 | 4 |
| ESP | Pol Martín Tiffon | 210 | 5 |
| GBR | Felix Gill | 213 | 6 |
| ROU | Filip Cristian Jianu | 277 | 7 |
| BUL | Petr Nesterov | 301 | 8 |

- ^{1} Rankings are as of 14 September 2026.

=== Other entrants ===
The following players received wildcards into the singles main draw:

- (Bulgaria) Ivan Ivanov
- (Bulgaria) Iliyan Radulov
- (Bulgaria) Alexander Vasilev

The following players received entry from the qualifying draw:

- (Spain) Izan Almazán Valiente
- (Bulgaria) Adrian Andreev
- (Romania) Sebastian Gima
- Pavel Lagutin
- (Ukraine) Nikita Mashtakov
- (Bulgaria) Yanaki Milev

== Champions ==
=== Singles ===
- (Spain) Max Alcalá Gurri def. (Czech Republic) Jonáš Forejtek 6–4, 6–2.

=== Doubles ===
- (Slovakia) Miloš Karol / (Czech Republic) Andrew Paulson def. (Romania) Bogdan Pavel / (Spain) Benjamín Winter López 6–3, 6–4.
