= 2021 Copa Sevilla – Doubles =

Doubles
- 2021 Copa Sevilla

Final
- Champions: (Spain) David Vega Hernández (Netherlands) Mark Vervoort
- Runners-up: (Spain) Javier Barranco Cosano (Spain) Sergio Martos Gornés
- Score: 6–3, 6–7^{(7–9)}, [10–7]

Events
Singles	Doubles
- Copa Sevilla

Gerard Granollers and Pedro Martínez were the defending champions but only Martínez chose to defend his title, partnering Daniel Gimeno Traver. Martínez withdrew in the quarterfinal round.

David Vega Hernández and Mark Vervoort won the title after defeating Javier Barranco Cosano and Sergio Martos Gornés 6–3, 6–7^{(7–9)}, [10–7] in the final.

== Seeds ==
1. (France) Sadio Doumbia / (France) Fabien Reboul (semifinals)
2. (Spain) David Vega Hernández / (Netherlands) Mark Vervoort (champions)
3. (Belgium) Michael Geerts / (Germany) Julian Lenz (semifinals, withdrew)
4. (Spain) Javier Barranco Cosano / (Spain) Sergio Martos Gornés (final)

== Draw ==
Key

- Q = Qualifier
- WC = Wild card
- LL = Lucky loser
- Alt = Alternate
- ITF = ITF entry
- PR = Protected ranking
- SR = Special ranking
- SE = Special exempt
- JE = Junior exempt
- JR = Junior Accelerator Programme entrant
- CO = College Accelerator Programme entrant
- NG = Next Gen Accelerator Program entrant
- w/o = Walkover
- r = Retired
- d = Defaulted

First round
(Peru) A Merino (Argentina) C Ugo Carabelli	6	3	[6]
(Spain) C Sánchez Jover (Spain) José Francisco Vidal Azorín	3	6	[10]
4	(Spain) J Barranco Cosano (Spain) S Martos Gornés	7	6
WC	(United States) Jack Vance (United States) Tennyson Whiting	5	2
(Spain) N Álvarez Varona (Spain) N Sánchez Izquierdo
(Russia) T Gabashvili (Italy) GM Moroni	w/o
WC	(Spain) A Barroso Campos (Spain) P Llamas Ruiz	6	6
(Italy) A Motti (Italy) J Ocleppo	4	4
(Spain) C Taberner (Spain) B Zapata Miralles	6	6^{5}	[6]
3	(Belgium) M Geerts (Germany) J Lenz	4	7^{7}	[10]
(Spain) D Gimeno Traver (Spain) P Martínez	5	6	[10]
(Italy) R Brancaccio (Spain) Eduard Esteve Lobato	7	4	[8]
(Italy) L Giustino (Portugal) G Oliveira
2	(Spain) D Vega Hernández (Netherlands) M Vervoort	w/o

Quarterfinals
1	(France) S Doumbia (France) F Reboul	7	6
(Spain) C Sánchez Jover (Spain) JF Vidal Azorín	5	3
4	(Spain) J Barranco Cosano (Spain) S Martos Gornés	w/o
(Russia) T Gabashvili (Italy) GM Moroni
WC	(Spain) A Barroso Campos (Spain) P Llamas Ruiz	5	6^{3}
3	(Belgium) M Geerts (Germany) J Lenz	7	7^{7}
(Spain) D Gimeno Traver (Spain) P Martínez
2	(Spain) D Vega Hernández (Netherlands) M Vervoort	w/o

Semifinals
1	(France) S Doumbia (France) F Reboul	7^{7}	3	[8]
4	(Spain) J Barranco Cosano (Spain) S Martos Gornés	6^{2}	6	[10]
3	(Belgium) M Geerts (Germany) J Lenz
2	(Spain) D Vega Hernández (Netherlands) M Vervoort	w/o

Final
4	(Spain) J Barranco Cosano (Spain) S Martos Gornés	3	7^{9}	[7]
2	(Spain) D Vega Hernández (Netherlands) M Vervoort	6	6^{7}	[10]
