= 2026 Plovdiv Challenger IV – Singles =

Singles
- 2026 Plovdiv Challenger IV

Final
- Champion: (Spain) Max Alcalá Gurri
- Runner-up: (Czech Republic) Jonáš Forejtek
- Score: 6–4, 6–2

Events
Singles	Doubles
- Plovdiv Challenger

Georgii Kravchenko was the defending champion but chose not to defend his title.

Max Alcalá Gurri won the title after defeating Jonáš Forejtek 6–4, 6–2 in the final.

== Seeds ==
1. (Spain) Max Alcalá Gurri (champion)
2. (Austria) Joel Schwärzler (first round)
3. (Germany) Diego Dedura (first round)
4. (Czech Republic) Maxim Mrva (second round)
5. (Spain) Pol Martín Tiffon (quarterfinals, retired)
6. (United Kingdom) Felix Gill (quarterfinals)
7. (Romania) Filip Cristian Jianu (first round)
8. (Bulgaria) Petr Nesterov (first round)

== Draw ==
Key

- Q = Qualifier
- WC = Wild card
- LL = Lucky loser
- Alt = Alternate
- ITF = ITF entry
- PR = Protected ranking
- SR = Special ranking
- SE = Special exempt
- JE = Junior exempt
- JR = Junior Accelerator Programme entrant
- CO = College Accelerator Programme entrant
- NG = Next Gen Accelerator Program entrant
- w/o = Walkover
- r = Retired
- d = Defaulted

=== Finals ===
Semifinals
1	(Spain) Max Alcalá Gurri	6	6
(Spain) Carlos Taberner	4	3
Q	(Bulgaria) Adrian Andreev	3	6	3
(Czech Republic) Jonáš Forejtek	6	4	6

Final
1	(Spain) Max Alcalá Gurri	6	6
(Czech Republic) Jonáš Forejtek	4	2

=== Top half ===
First round
1	(Spain) M Alcalá Gurri	6	6
(Ivory Coast) E Coulibaly	4	2
(Belgium) M Geerts	4	5
(Spain) C Sánchez Jover	6	7
(Italy) Tommaso Compagnucci	6	1	6
Q	(Bulgaria) Y Milev	3	6	3
(Lebanon) B Hassan	6	4	1
5	(Spain) P Martín Tiffon	1	6	6
3	(Germany) D Dedura	3	2
(Spain) O Roca Batalla	6	6
(Colombia) DE Galán	7^{7}	6^{4}	6^{5}
(France) C Hemery	6^{3}	7^{7}	7^{7}
(Germany) M Wiskandt	7^{7}	6
Andrey Chepelev	6^{3}	1
(Spain) C Taberner	6	1	6
8	(Bulgaria) P Nesterov	4	6	0

Second round
1	(Spain) M Alcalá Gurri	6	6
(Spain) C Sánchez Jover	3	2
(Italy) T Compagnucci	1	6^{2}
5	(Spain) P Martín Tiffon	6	7^{7}
(Spain) O Roca Batalla	6	4	1
(France) C Hemery	3	6	6
(Germany) M Wiskandt	5	4
(Spain) C Taberner	7	6

Quarterfinals
1	(Spain) M Alcalá Gurri	5
5	(Spain) P Martín Tiffon	2^{r}
(France) C Hemery	6	5	4
(Spain) C Taberner	1	7	6

Semifinals
1	(Spain) M Alcalá Gurri	6	6
(Spain) C Taberner	4	3

=== Bottom half ===
First round
7	(Romania) FC Jianu	6^{5}	3
WC	(Bulgaria) I Ivanov	7^{7}	6
Q	(Bulgaria) A Andreev	6	6
(North Macedonia) O Prihodko	1	4
Q	(Spain) Izan Almazán Valiente	6	6
(France) G Blancaneaux	4	4
Q	(Ukraine) N Mashtakov	4	6	2
4	(Czech Republic) M Mrva	6	4	6
6	(United Kingdom) F Gill	6	6
WC	(Bulgaria) A Vasilev	1	0
WC	(Bulgaria) I Radulov	7	6
Q	Pavel Lagutin	5	2
Q	(Romania) Sebastian Gima	4	6	3
(Czech Republic) J Forejtek	6	4	6
(France) M Chazal	2	6	7^{11}
2	(Austria) J Schwärzler	6	4	6^{9}

Second round
WC	(Bulgaria) I Ivanov	6^{5}	3
Q	(Bulgaria) A Andreev	7^{7}	6
Q	(Spain) I Almazán Valiente	7	0	6
4	(Czech Republic) M Mrva	5	6	2
6	(United Kingdom) F Gill	7	6
WC	(Bulgaria) I Radulov	5	4
(Czech Republic) J Forejtek	6	5	6
(France) M Chazal	1	7	0

Quarterfinals
Q	(Bulgaria) A Andreev	6	6
Q	(Spain) I Almazán Valiente	1	2
6	(United Kingdom) F Gill	6^{3}	0
(Czech Republic) J Forejtek	7^{7}	6

Semifinals
Q	(Bulgaria) A Andreev	3	6	3
(Czech Republic) J Forejtek	6	4	6
