= Alejandro Manzanera Pertusa =

Spanish tennis player (born 2003)

- Country (sports): Spain
- Born: 8 April 2003 (age 23)
- Plays: Left-handed
- Prize money: $27,016

Singles
- Career record: 0–0
- Career titles: 0
- Highest ranking: No. 614 (15 September 2025)
- Current ranking: No. 614 (15 September 2025)

Grand Slam singles results
- Wimbledon Junior: 2R (2021)
- US Open Junior: 2R (2021)

Doubles
- Career record: 0–0
- Career titles: 0
- Highest ranking: No. 510 (30 January 2023)
- Current ranking: No. 648 (15 September 2025)

Grand Slam doubles results
- Wimbledon Junior: W (2021)
- Last updated on: 15 September 2025.

Alejandro Manzanera Pertusa (born 8 April 2003) is a Spanish tennis player.

Manzanera Pertusa has a career high ATP singles ranking of No. 614 achieved on 15 September 2025 and ATP doubles ranking of No. 510 achieved on 30 January 2023.

Manzanera Pertusa won the 2021 Wimbledon Championships – Boys' doubles title.

== Junior Grand Slam titles ==
=== Doubles: 1 (1 title) ===
Result	Year	Tournament	Surface	Partner	Opponents	Score
Winner	2021	(United Kingdom) Wimbledon	Grass	(Lithuania) Edas Butvilas	(Spain) Daniel Rincón (Jordan) Abedallah Shelbayh	6–3, 6–4

== ITF World Tennis Tour and ATP Challenger finals ==
=== Singles: 4 (3–1) ===
Legend (singles) ATP Challenger Tour (0–0) ITF World Tennis Tour (3–1)	Titles by surface Hard (0–0) Clay (3–1) Grass (0–0) Carpet (0–0)

Result	W–L	Date	Tournament	Tier	Surface	Opponent	Score
Win	1–0	Apr 2023	M15 Telde, Spain	World Tour	Clay	(Poland) Marcel Zielinski	6–4, 7–6^{(7–5)}
Win	2–0	Apr 2024	M15 Telde, Spain	World Tour	Clay	(Spain) Tomás Currás Abasolo	6–7^{(6–8)}, 6–3, 6–0
Win	3–0	Jul 2025	M15 Xàtiva, Spain	World Tour	Clay	(Spain) Pablo Martínez Gómez	6–4, 6–4
Loss	3–1	Sep 2025	M15 Madrid, Spain	World Tour	Clay	(Argentina) Julio César Porras	4–6, 6–3, 6–7^{(2–7)}

=== Doubles 7 (4–5) ===
Legend (doubles) ATP Challenger Tour (0–0) ITF Futures Tour (4–5)	Titles by surface Hard (0–0) Clay (4–5) Grass (0–0) Carpet (0–0)

Result	W–L	Date	Tournament	Tier	Surface	Partner	Opponents	Score
Loss	0–1	Sep 2021	M15 Melilla, Spain	World Tennis Tour	Clay	(Lithuania) Edas Butvilas	(Spain) Óscar Mesquida Berg (Chile) Miguel Fernando Pereira	2–6, 7–6^{(7–3)}, [9–11]
Loss	0–2	Apr 2022	M25 Reus, Spain	World Tennis Tour	Clay	(United States) Dali Blanch	(Germany) Peter Heller (Netherlands) Mark Vervoort	Walkover
Loss	0–3	Jul 2022	M25 Gandia, Spain	World Tennis Tour	Clay	(Spain) Samuel Martínez Arjona	(Netherlands) Michiel de Krom (Netherlands) Ryan Nijboer	4–6, 0–6
Loss	0–4	Jul 2022	M25 Dénia, Spain	World Tennis Tour	Clay	(Spain) Samuel Martínez Arjona	(Spain) Alejandro García (Spain) Mario Mansilla Díez	2–6, 3–6
Win	1–4	Nov 2022	M15 Benicarló, Spain	World Tennis Tour	Clay	(Lithuania) Edas Butvilas	(Switzerland) Noah Lopez (Spain) David Naharro	6–2, 6–2
Loss	1–5	Dec 2022	M15 Madrid, Spain	World Tennis Tour	Clay	(Spain) Samuel Martínez Arjona	(Switzerland) Rémy Bertola (Italy) Pietro Schiavetti	6–3, 3–6, [3–10]
Win	2–5	Jun 2023	M15 Casablanca, Morocco	World Tennis Tour	Clay	(Spain) Carles Hernández	(Spain) Max Alcalá Gurri (Spain) Jorge Martínez	6–4, 6–2
Win	3–5	Oct 2023	M15 Castellón, Spain	World Tennis Tour	Clay	(Spain) Samuel Martínez Arjona	(Russia) Kirill Mishkin (Russia) Vitali Shvets	6–4, 6–4
Win	4–5	Apr 2024	M15 Telde, Spain	World Tennis Tour	Clay	(Spain) Diego Augusto Barreto Sánchez	(Italy) Marco Miceli (Spain) Bruno Pujol Navarro	6–1, 5–7, [10–5]
