= Royan Atlantique Open =

- 2025 Royan Atlantique Open

ATP Challenger Tour
- Location: Royan, France
- Venue: Garden Tennis Club
- Category: ATP Challenger Tour
- Surface: Clay
- Prize money: 54,000
- Website: website

The Royan Atlantique Open is a professional tennis tournament played on clay courts. It is currently part of the ATP Challenger Tour and is been held in Royan, France. It returned to the tennis schedule in 2025 after last being held in 1981.

== Past finals ==
=== Singles ===
Year	Champion	Runner-up	Score
2025	(France) Titouan Droguet	(Bulgaria) Dimitar Kuzmanov	4–6, 6–1, 6–4
2026	(Spain) Max Alcalá Gurri	(France) Cosme Rolland de Ravel	7–6^{(7–4)}, 6–1

=== Doubles ===
Year	Champions	Runners-up	Score
2025	(Croatia) Matej Dodig (Croatia) Nino Serdarušić	(India) Adil Kalyanpur (India) Parikshit Somani	7–5, 6–7^{(4–7)}, [12–10]
2026	(Netherlands) Daniel de Jonge (Germany) Jannik Opitz	(Spain) Ignasi Forcano (Netherlands) Mark Vervoort	6–4, 6–4
