= Mark Vervoort =

Dutch tennis player

- Country (sports): Netherlands
- Born: 7 October 1990 (age 35)
- Prize money: US $115,804

Singles
- Career record: 0–0
- Career titles: 0
- Highest ranking: No. 814 (21 May 2012)

Doubles
- Career record: 0–0
- Career titles: 0
- Highest ranking: No. 116 (29 August 2016)
- Current ranking: No. 425 (14 September 2026)
- Last updated on: 17 September 2026.

Mark Vervoort (born 7 October 1990) is a Dutch tennis player playing on the ATP Challenger Tour. On 21 May 2012, he reached his highest ATP singles ranking of No. 814 and his highest doubles ranking of No. 116 achieved on 29 August 2016.

== Challenger and Futures finals ==
=== Doubles: 54 (23–31) ===
Legend (doubles) ATP Challenger Tour (4–5) ITF Futures Tour / WTT (19–26)	Titles by surface Hard (3–3) Clay (20–28) Grass (0–0) Carpet (0–0)

Result	W–L	Date	Tournament	Tier	Surface	Partner	Opponents	Score
Loss	0–1	Jul 2010	Spain F27, Dénia	Futures	Clay	(Spain) Javier Valenzuela-González	(Spain) Carlos Calderón-Rodríguez (Spain) Pablo Carreño Busta	4–6, 6–7^{(3–7)}
Loss	0–2	Apr 2011	Spain F11, Madrid	Futures	Clay	(Spain) Carlos Poch Gradin	(Spain) Guillermo Alcaide (Russia) Nikolai Nesterov	4–6, 4–6
Win	1–2	May 2011	Morocco F3, Agadir	Futures	Clay	(Spain) Enrique López Pérez	(Portugal) Gonçalo Pereira (Italy) Matthieu Viérin	6–3, 6–1
Loss	1–3	Sep 2011	Spain F32, Oviedo	Futures	Clay	(Portugal) Gonçalo Falcão	(Spain) Miguel Ángel López Jaén (Spain) Carlos Poch Gradin	6–4, 3–6, [7–10]
Win	2–3	Oct 2011	Algeria F3, Alger	Futures	Clay	(Austria) Lukas Jastraunig	(Dominican Republic) Michael-Ray Pallares González (United States) Murphey Parker	6–0, 7–6^{(7–3)}
Loss	2–4	Mar 2012	Spain F4, Cartagena	Futures	Clay	(Spain) Jordi Samper Montaña	(Spain) Miguel Ángel López Jaén (Spain) Gabriel Trujillo Soler	3–6, 3–6
Loss	2–5	Jun 2012	Spain F14, Madrid	Futures	Clay	(Greece) Alexandros Jakupovic	(Spain) Iván Arenas-Gualda (Spain) Enrique López Pérez	0–6, 2–6
Win	3–5	Jul 2012	Estonia F2, Kuressaare	Futures	Clay	(Netherlands) Jeroen Benard	(Estonia) Vladimir Ivanov (Russia) Ivan Nedelko	4–6, 7–6^{(7–4)}, [10–5]
Win	4–5	Aug 2012	Lithuania F1, Vilnius	Futures	Clay	(Greece) Theodoros Angelinos	(Estonia) Vladimir Ivanov (Russia) Ivan Nedelko	w/o
Win	5–5	Oct 2012	Algeria F3, Alger	Futures	Clay	(Spain) Marc Giner	(Italy) Kevin Albonetti (Netherlands) Jan-Wouter Roep	6–3, 6–4
Win	6–5	Nov 2012	Burundi F1, Bujumbura	Futures	Clay	(Austria) Lukas Jastraunig	(Italy) Alessandro Bega (Italy) Riccardo Sinicropi	6–4, 3–6, [10–8]
Loss	6–6	Nov 2012	Rwanda F2, Kigali	Futures	Clay	(Venezuela) Jordi Muñoz Abreu	(Austria) Lukas Jastraunig (Austria) Gerald Melzer	6–3, 3–6, [3–10]
Loss	6–7	Apr 2013	Egypt F2, Cairo	Futures	Clay	(Spain) Enrique López Pérez	(Netherlands) Stephan Fransen (Netherlands) Wesley Koolhof	0–6, 3–6
Loss	6–8	May 2013	Spain F11, Vic	Futures	Clay	(Spain) Oriol Roca Batalla	(Spain) Miguel Ángel López Jaén (Spain) Jordi Marsé-Vidri	6–7^{(7–9)}, 3–6
Win	7–8	Jun 2013	Turkey F21, Mersin	Futures	Clay	(Italy) Francesco Picco	(Brazil) Alex Blumenberg (Russia) Andrei Plotniy	6–4, 6–1
Win	8–8	Jun 2013	Spain F16, Santa Margarida de Montbui	Futures	Hard	(Spain) Oriol Roca Batalla	(Spain) Miguel Ángel López Jaén (Spain) Jordi Marsé-Vidri	3–6, 6–3, [10–6]
Loss	8–9	Jul 2013	Egypt F15, Sharm El Sheikh	Futures	Clay	(Venezuela) Luis David Martínez	(Bosnia and Herzegovina) Nerman Fatić (Bosnia and Herzegovina) Ismar Gorčić	3–6, 3–6
Loss	8–10	Oct 2013	Spain F35, El Prat de Llobregat	Futures	Clay	(Venezuela) Jordi Muñoz Abreu	(Australia) Jason Kubler (Spain) Pol Toledo Bagué	2–6, 6–4, [6–10]
Loss	8–11	Mar 2014	Iran F2, Kish	Futures	Clay	(Venezuela) Jordi Muñoz Abreu	(Netherlands) Stephan Fransen (Netherlands) Wesley Koolhof	7–5, 5–7, [6–10]
Loss	8–12	Apr 2014	Egypt F12, Sharm El Sheikh	Futures	Clay	(Germany) Steven Moneke	(Poland) Andriej Kapaś (Poland) Błażej Koniusz	2–6, 6–7^{(1–7)}
Win	9–12	May 2014	Iran F7, Kish	Futures	Clay	(Serbia) Marko Tepavac	(India) Ronak Manuja (India) Akash Wagh	7–6^{(7–5)}, 4–6, [10–1]
Win	10–12	May 2014	Spain F8, Lleida	Futures	Clay	(Venezuela) Jordi Muñoz Abreu	(Spain) Sergio Martos Gornés (Spain) Pol Toledo Bagué	3–6, 6–1, [10–6]
Loss	10–13	May 2014	Spain F9, Valldoreix	Futures	Clay	(Venezuela) Jordi Muñoz Abreu	(Japan) Soichiro Moritani (Japan) Takashi Saito	6–1, 4–6, [6–10]
Loss	10–14	Jun 2014	Egypt F21, Sharm El Sheikh	Futures	Clay	(Italy) Francesco Picco	(Egypt) Karim-Mohamed Maamoun (Syria) Issam Haitham Taweel	6–4, 1–6, [4–10]
Loss	10–15	Jun 2014	Netherlands F2, Alkmaar	Futures	Clay	(Venezuela) Jordi Muñoz Abreu	(Netherlands) Sander Arends (Netherlands) Niels Lootsma	0–6, 6–3, [7–10]
Loss	10–16	Sep 2014	Iran F10, Tehran	Futures	Clay	(Venezuela) Jordi Muñoz Abreu	(Italy) Matteo Marfia (Switzerland) Luca Margaroli	4–6, 6–7^{(4–7)}
Win	11–16	Nov 2014	Kuwait F1, Meshref	Futures	Hard	(Spain) Juan Lizariturry	(France) Quentin Halys (France) Calvin Hemery	6–4, 7–6^{(7–4)}
Loss	11–17	Mar 2015	Iran F5, Kish	Futures	Clay	(Venezuela) Jordi Muñoz Abreu	(France) Jérôme Inzerillo (France) Jules Marie	3–6, 4–6
Loss	11–18	Mar 2015	Egypt F9, Sharm El Sheikh	Futures	Hard	(Spain) Íñigo Cervantes Huegun	(Poland) Karol Drzewiecki (Poland) Maciej Smoła	3–6, 6–4, [4–10]
Win	12–18	May 2015	Algeria F2, Algiers	Futures	Clay	(Spain) David Pérez Sanz	(Brazil) Rafael Camilo (Spain) Adria Mas Mascolo	6–4, 6–4
Loss	12–19	Jun 2015	Russia F3, Kazan	Futures	Clay	(Ukraine) Vladyslav Manafov	(Russia) Mikhail Fufygin (Russia) Andrei Levine	6–7^{(3–7)}, 3–6
Win	13–19	Jun 2015	Italy F14, Napoli	Futures	Clay	(Spain) Gerard Granollers Pujol	(Italy) Filippo Baldi (Spain) Eduard Esteve Lobato	6–4, 7–5
Loss	13–20	Jun 2015	Italy F15, Basilicanova	Futures	Clay	(Spain) Gerard Granollers Pujol	(Germany) Maximilian Marterer (Germany) Daniel Masur	2–6, 6–1, [4–10]
Loss	13–21	Aug 2015	Russia F5, Moscow	Futures	Clay	(Ukraine) Vladyslav Manafov	(Estonia) Vladimir Ivanov (Belarus) Andrei Vasilevski	2–6, 4–6
Win	14–21	Aug 2015	Italy F24, Piombino	Futures	Clay	(Serbia) Ilija Vučić	(Italy) Jacopo Stefanini (Italy) Andrea Vavassori	7–6^{(8–6)}, 6–2
Loss	14–22	Oct 2015	Rome, Italy	Challenger	Clay	(Spain) Íñigo Cervantes Huegun	(Poland) Tomasz Bednarek (Poland) Mateusz Kowalczyk	2–6, 1–6
Win	15–22	Oct 2015	Mohammedia, Morocco	Challenger	Clay	(Spain) Íñigo Cervantes Huegun	(Spain) Pablo Carreño Busta (Spain) Roberto Carballés Baena	3–6, 7–6^{(7–2)}, [12–10]
Win	16–22	Oct 2015	Monterrey, Mexico	Challenger	Hard	(Netherlands) Thiemo de Bakker	(Italy) Paolo Lorenzi (Brazil) Fernando Romboli	w/o
Loss	16–23	Aug 2016	Fano, Italy	Challenger	Clay	(Austria) Lucas Miedler	(Italy) Riccardo Ghedin (Italy) Alessandro Motti	4–6, 4–6
Loss	16–24	Jan 2017	Tunisia F3, Hammamet	Futures	Clay	(Spain) Oriol Roca Batalla	(Montenegro) Ljubomir Čelebić (Montenegro) Rrezart Cungu	4–6, 3–6
Win	17–24	Feb 2017	Tunisia F4, Hammamet	Futures	Clay	(Spain) Oriol Roca Batalla	(Montenegro) Ljubomir Čelebić (Italy) Davide Melchiorre	6–2, 6–4
Win	18–24	Apr 2017	Italy F7, Santa Margherita di Pula	Futures	Clay	(United States) Rhyne Williams	(Switzerland) Adrian Bodmer (Germany) Jakob Sude	6–4, 6–4
Win	19–24	Feb 2018	Spain F4, Paguera	Futures	Clay	(Spain) Sergio Martos Gornés	(Spain) Pablo Schelcher Muro (Spain) Pedro Vives Marcos	7–5, 3–6, [10–5]
Win	20–24	Mar 2018	Italy F5, Santa Margherita di Pula	Futures	Clay	(Switzerland) Adrian Bodmer	(Belgium) Maxime Authom (Netherlands) Tallon Griekspoor	7–6^{(7–3)}, 4–6, [12–10]
Loss	20–25	Jun 2018	L’Aquila, Italy	Challenger	Clay	(Spain) Pedro Martínez	(Italy) Filippo Baldi (Italy) Andrea Pellegrino	6–4, 3–6, [5–10]
Win	21–25	Aug 2018	Meerbusch, Germany	Challenger	Clay	(Spain) David Pérez Sanz	(Poland) Grzegorz Panfil (Ukraine) Volodymyr Uzhylovskyi	3–6, 6–4, [10–7]
Loss	21–26	Jun 2019	Poznań, Poland	Challenger	Clay	(Spain) Pedro Martínez	(Italy) Andrea Vavassori (Spain) David Vega Hernández	4–6, 7–6^{(7–4)}, [6–10]
Loss	21–27	Oct 2020	M25 Hamburg, Germany	WTT	Hard (i)	(Italy) Raúl Brancaccio	(Norway) Viktor Durasovic (Sweden) Markus Eriksson	3–6, 7–5, [9–11]
Loss	21–28	Feb 2021	M25 Villena, Spain	WTT	Hard	(Spain) Íñigo Cervantes	(France) Dan Added (India) Arjun Kadhe	4–6, 2–6
Win	22-28	Sep 2021	Seville, Spain	Challenger	Clay	(Spain) David Vega Hernández	(Spain) Javier Barranco Cosano (Spain) Sergio Martos Gornés	6–3, 6–7^{(7–9)}, [10–7]
Win	23–28	Apr 2022	M25 Reus, Spain	WTT	Clay	(Germany) Peter Heller	(United States) Dali Blanch (Spain) Alejandro Manzanera Pertusa	Walkover
Loss	23–29	Jul 2025	M25 Dénia, Spain	WTT	Clay	(Spain) Mario Mansilla Díez	(India) S D Prajwal Dev (India) Nitin Kumar Sinha	3–6, 4–6
Loss	23–30	May 2026	M25 Vic, Spain	WTT	Clay	(Spain) Ignasi Forcano	(United States) Keaton Hance (United States) Jack Kennedy	4–6, 4–6
Loss	23-31	Jun 2026	Royan, France	Challenger	Clay	(Spain) Ignasi Forcano	(Netherlands) Daniel de Jonge (Germany) Jannik Opitz	4–6, 4–6
