= ATP Tour =

Worldwide top-tier tennis tour for men

- Current season, competition or edition: 2026 ATP Tour
- Formerly: ATP World Tour (2009–2018)
- Association: Association of Tennis Professionals
- Classification: Men's professional tennis tour
- Sport: Tennis
- Founded: 1990; 36 years ago
- First season: 1990 ATP Tour
- Owner: Association of Tennis Professionals
- Organizing body: Association of Tennis Professionals
- Sports fielded: men's: Yes
- Country: Worldwide
- Related competitions: ATP Challenger Tour; ITF Men's World Tennis Tour
- Tournament format: Single elimination
- Website: www.atptour.com
- 2026 ATP Tour

The ATP Tour (known as ATP World Tour between January 2009 and December 2018) is the sole worldwide top-tier tennis tour for men organized by the Association of Tennis Professionals (ATP) founded in 1990 that replaced the earlier dual Grand Prix Circuit and WCT Circuit. The second-tier tour is the ATP Challenger Tour and the third-tier is the ITF Men's World Tennis Tour. The equivalent women's organisation is the WTA Tour.

== ATP Tour tournaments ==
The ATP Tour comprises ATP Masters 1000, ATP 500, and ATP 250 and the United Cup. The ATP also oversees the ATP Challenger Tour, a level below the ATP Tour, and the ATP Champions Tour for seniors. The Grand Slam tournaments, the Olympic tennis tournament, the Davis Cup, and the entry-level ITF World Tennis Tour do not fall under the purview of the ATP, but are overseen by the International Tennis Federation (ITF) instead and the International Olympic Committee (IOC) for the Olympics. In these events, however, ATP ranking points are awarded, with the exception of the Olympics. Players and doubles teams with the most ranking points (collected during the calendar year) play in the season-ending ATP Finals, which, from 2000–2008, was run jointly with the ITF. The top eight 20-and-under players may compete in the season-ending Next Generation ATP Finals if they do not qualify for the ATP Finals. The details of the professional tennis tour are:

Category	Tournaments	Winner's ranking points	Average prize money (2022)	Governing body
Grand Slam	4	2,000	US$24,266,872	ITF
ATP Finals	1	1,100–1,500	US$15,250,000 (2024)	ATP
Next Generation ATP Finals	1	0	US$2,050,000 (2024)	ATP
ATP Masters 1000	9	1,000	US$5,007,832	ATP
ATP 500	16	500	US$1,803,832	ATP
ATP 250	29	250	US$615,151	ATP
United Cup	1	500 (max)	US$15,000,000 (2023)	ATP/WTA
Davis Cup	1	0	US$15,300,000 (2021)	ITF
Olympics	1	0	0	IOC/ITF
ATP Challenger Tour	178	50 to 175	$64,901	ATP
ITF Men's Circuit	534	15 to 25	$17,798	ITF

== ATP rankings ==
ATP publishes weekly rankings of professional players.

=== Current rankings ===
[ · ]

ATP rankings (singles) as of 31 August 2026
No.	Player	Points	Move
1	Jannik Sinner (ITA)	12,800	Steady
2	Alexander Zverev (GER)	7,790	Steady
3	Carlos Alcaraz (ESP)	7,160	Steady
4	Félix Auger-Aliassime (CAN)	4,640	Steady
5	Novak Djokovic (SRB)	3,770	Steady
6	Flavio Cobolli (ITA)	3,720	Steady
7	Alex de Minaur (AUS)	3,650	Steady
8	Daniil Medvedev	3,580	Steady
9	Ben Shelton (USA)	3,480	Steady
10	Taylor Fritz (USA)	3,475	Steady
11	Arthur Fils (FRA)	3,140	Steady
12	Frances Tiafoe (USA)	2,680	Steady
13	Rafael Jódar (ESP)	2,671	Steady
14	Lorenzo Musetti (ITA)	2,605	Steady
15	Learner Tien (USA)	2,565	Steady
16	Alexander Bublik (KAZ)	2,525	Steady
17	Brandon Nakashima (USA)	2,485	Steady
18	Jakub Menšík (CZE)	2,445	Steady
19	Jiří Lehečka (CZE)	2,420	Steady
20	Casper Ruud (NOR)	2,385	Steady

[ · ]

ATP rankings (doubles) as of 31 August 2026
No.	Player	Points	Move
1	Harri Heliövaara (FIN)	10,140	Steady
=	Henry Patten (GBR)	10,140	Steady
3	Horacio Zeballos (ARG)	7,670	Steady
4	Marcel Granollers (ESP)	7,670	Steady
5	Neal Skupski (GBR)	6,090	Steady
6	Marcelo Arévalo (ESA)	5,380	Steady
7	Mate Pavić (CRO)	5,380	Steady
8	Andrea Vavassori (ITA)	5,090	Steady
9	Simone Bolelli (ITA)	4,790	Steady
10	Kevin Krawietz (GER)	4,650	Steady
11	Tim Pütz (GER)	4,380	Steady
12	Christian Harrison (USA)	4,140	Steady
13	Orlando Luz (BRA)	3,950	Steady
14	Manuel Guinard (FRA)	3,835	Steady
15	Guido Andreozzi (ARG)	3,835	Steady
16	Rafael Matos (BRA)	3,825	Steady
17	Julian Cash (GBR)	3,790	Steady
=	Lloyd Glasspool (GBR)	3,790	Steady
19	Albano Olivetti (FRA)	3,290	Steady
20	Théo Arribagé (FRA)	3,200	Steady

== See also ==
- Tennis Europe Junior Tour
- ATP Challenger Tour
- ITF Men's World Tennis Tour
- ITF Junior Circuit
- WTA Tour
- Grand Prix tennis circuit
- World Championship Tennis
- Tennis Pro Tours
