= Adriatic Challenger =

Tennis tournament held in Italy in 2016

ATP Challenger Tour
- Event name: Adriatic Challenger
- Location: Fano, Italy
- Venue: Circolo Tennis Fano
- Category: ATP Challenger Tour
- Surface: Clay
- Draw: 32S/32Q/16D
- Prize money: €42,500

The Adriatic Challenger was a professional tennis tournament played on clay courts. It was part of the Association of Tennis Professionals (ATP) Challenger Tour. It was held in Fano, Italy, in 2016.

== Past finals ==
=== Singles ===
Year	Champion	Runner-up	Score
2016	(Brazil) João Souza	(Argentina) Nicolás Kicker	6–4, 6–7^{(12–14)}, 6–2

=== Doubles ===
Year	Champions	Runners-up	Score
2016	(Italy) Riccardo Ghedin (Italy) Alessandro Motti	(Austria) Lucas Miedler (Netherlands) Mark Vervoort	6–4, 6–4
