= Daniel de Jonge =

Dutch tennis player (born 1999)

- Country (sports): Netherlands
- Born: 17 August 1999 (age 27) Vlissingen, Netherlands
- Height: 1.93 m (6 ft 4 in)
- Plays: Right-handed (two-handed backhand)
- College: Pepperdine
- Prize money: US $61,182

Singles
- Career record: 0–0 (at ATP Tour level, Grand Slam level, and in Davis Cup)
- Career titles: 3 ITF
- Highest ranking: No. 558 (16 November 2026)
- Current ranking: No. 558 (16 November 2026)

Doubles
- Career record: 0–1 (at ATP Tour level, Grand Slam level, and in Davis Cup)
- Career titles: 1 Challenger, 7 ITF
- Highest ranking: No. 340 (19 October 2026)
- Current ranking: No. 350 (16 November 2026)
- Last updated on: 16 November 2026.

Daniel de Jonge (born 17 August 1999) is a Dutch tennis player. De Jonge has a career high ATP singles ranking of No. 558 achieved on 16 November 2026 and a career high ATP doubles ranking of No. 340 achieved on 19 October 2026.

De Jonge made his ATP main draw debut at the 2026 ABN AMRO Open after receiving a wildcard for the doubles main draw. He has won one ATP Challenger doubles title at the 2026 Royan Atlantique Open.

De Jonge played college tennis at Pepperdine.
