= Andrés Santamarta Roig =

Spanish tennis player (born 2007)

- Country (sports): Spain
- Born: 23 January 2007 (age 19) Valencia, Spain
- Height: 1.80 m (5 ft 11 in)
- Plays: Right-handed (two-handed backhand)
- Coach: Iván Gallego, Sergio Gallego (GTennis Academy)
- Prize money: US $38,060

Singles
- Career record: 0–0 (at ATP Tour level, Grand Slam level, and in Davis Cup)
- Career titles: 0
- Highest ranking: No. 604 (2 February 2026)
- Current ranking: No. 610 (9 November 2026)

Doubles
- Career record: 0–0 (at ATP Tour level, Grand Slam level, and in Davis Cup)
- Career titles: 0
- Highest ranking: No. 826 (8 September 2025)
- Current ranking: No. 1,789 (9 November 2026)
- Last updated on: 9 November 2026.

Andrés Santamarta Roig (born 23 January 2007) is a Spanish tennis player. He has a career-high ATP singles ranking of No. 604 achieved on 2 February 2026 and a doubles ranking of No. 826, reached on 8 September 2025.

== Early life ==
From Valencia, Spain, he started playing tennis at the age of four years-old and competitively a few years later. He attended school locally before switching to an online school through a program based in Madrid.

== Junior career ==
Santamarta Roig won the Madrid Open U16 title in 2023 and won the Spanish Junior Championship the following year.

He also had remarkable results at international junior events. In December 2024, he became the first Spaniard since Alberto Martín in 1996 to win the prestigious Orange Bowl, United States, defeating French Moïse Kouamé in the final. Having also previously won the J300 Bradenton that month, he became the fifth player to achieve that particular double after Andy Roddick in 1999, Dominic Thiem in 2011, Miomir Kecmanovic in 2016, and Thiago Agustín Tirante in 2019.

In March 2025, Santamarta Roig was crowned champion at another notable junior tournament, the Banana Bowl in Gaspar, Brazil, where he defeated local player João Pedro Didoni Bonini in the final. The following month, he won the J500 International HTV Junior Open in Offenbach, Germany, defeating Romanian Yannick Theodor Alexandrescou in straight sets. Later that season, he became the first seed at the 2025 French Open in the boys' singles but was defeated by eventual champion Niels McDonald.

He reached an ITF junior combined ranking of world No. 1 on 9 June 2025.

== Professional career ==
In 2024, he made his debut on the ATP Challenger Tour. In November, he was brought in as a practice partner for the Spanish Davis Cup Team ahead of the Davis Cup Finals.

== Personal life ==
Santamarta Roig has three siblings. His father and two older brothers also played tennis.

== ITF World Tennis Tour finals ==
=== Doubles: 3 (2 titles, 1 runner-up) ===
Legend ITF WTT (2–1)

Result	W–L	Date	Tournament	Tier	Surface	Partner	Opponents	Score
Win	1–0	Feb 2025	M15 Valencia, Spain	WTT	Clay	(Spain) Carles Córdoba	(Spain) Álvaro Bueno Gil (Spain) Mario Mansilla Díez	6–4, 6–2
Loss	1–1	Feb 2025	M15 Valencia, Spain	WTT	Clay	(Spain) Carlos Sánchez Jover	(Spain) Mario Mansilla Díez (Spain) Benjamín Winter López	1–6, 2–6
Win	2–1	Aug 2025	M25 Gijón, Spain	WTT	Clay	(Spain) Carles Córdoba	(Spain) Benjamín Winter López (Spain) Pedro Vives Marcos	7–5, 3–6, [10–7]
