= Max Alcalá Gurri =

Spanish tennis player (born 2002)

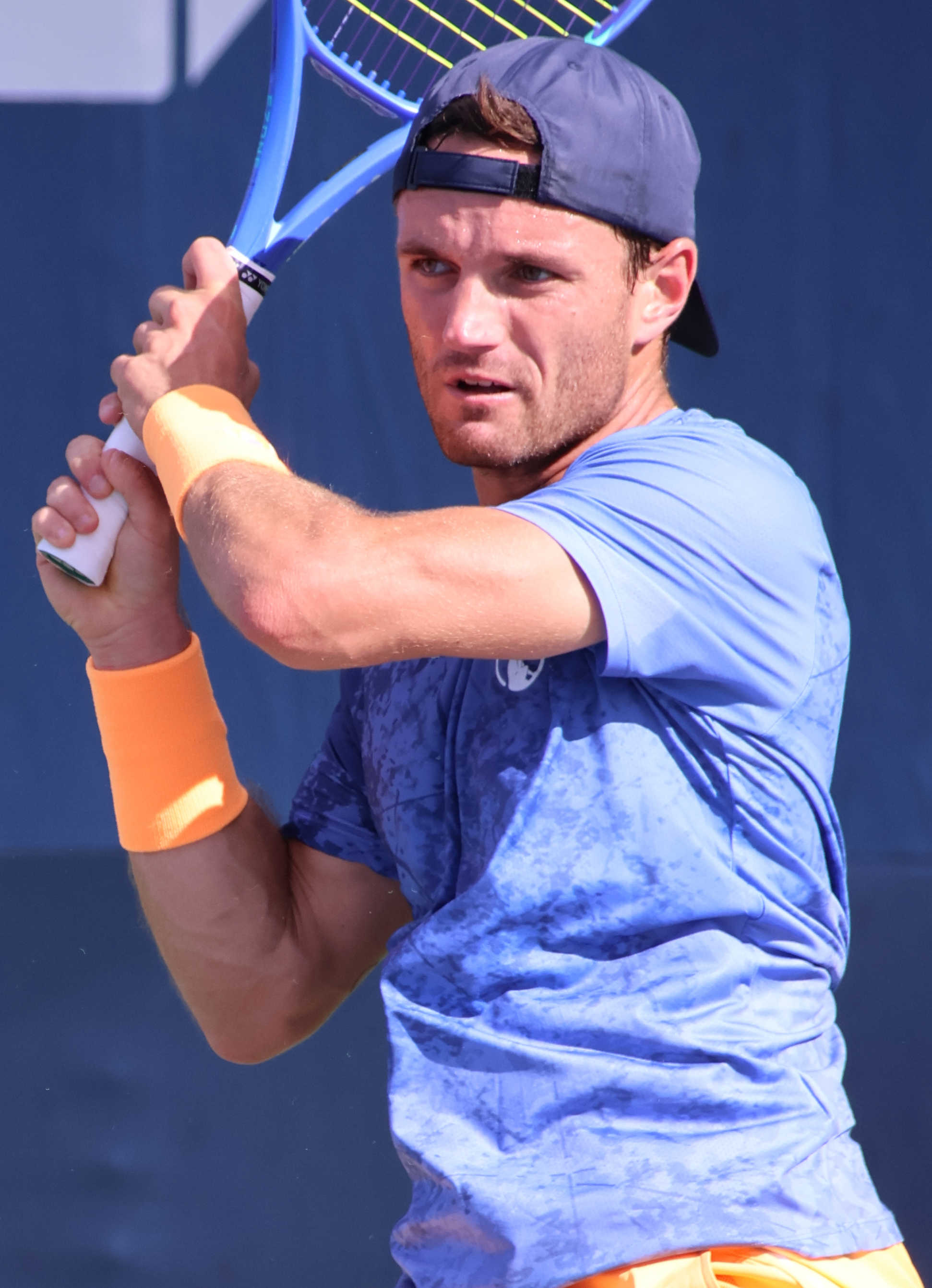
- Alcalá Gurri at the 2026 US Open
- Country (sports): Spain
- Born: 11 September 2002 (age 24) Barcelona, Spain
- Height: 1.78 m (5 ft 10 in)
- Plays: Right-Handed, Two-Handed Backhand
- Coach: Roger Pérez
- Prize money: US $261,050

Singles
- Career record: 0–0 (at ATP Tour level, Grand Slam level, and in Davis Cup)
- Career titles: 4 ATP Challenger
- Highest ranking: No. 130 (2 November 2026)
- Current ranking: No. 130 (2 November 2026)

Grand Slam singles results
- US Open: Q1 (2026)

Doubles
- Career record: 0–0 (at ATP Tour level, Grand Slam level, and in Davis Cup)
- Career titles: 0
- Highest ranking: No. 418 (26 October 2026)
- Current ranking: No. 419 (2 November 2026)
- Last updated on: 2 November 2026.

Max Alcalá Gurri (born 11 September 2002) is a Spanish tennis player. He reached a career high ATP singles ranking of No. 130 achieved on 2 November 2026 and a doubles ranking of No. 418 achieved on 26 October 2026.

== Career ==
=== 2022-2024: ITF titles, ATP Tour qualifying debut ===
In April 2022, he was entered at a wildcard in the qualifying competition of the 2022 Barcelona Open. He won against seeded player, Peter Gojowczyk in the first round due to a match retirement, but lost out of a chance to qualify in the main tournament to another wildcard entrant, Nicolás Álvarez Varona, in straight sets in the final round. In June, partnered with compatriot Bruno Pujol Navarro, he won his first ITF doubles tournament at M15 Wrocław. He won his first ITF singles tournament in the same year, defeating his compatriot Álvaro López San Martín in straight sets at M15 Sabadell. In the first quarter of the 2023 season, he triumphed to a second M15 ITF doubles title in Antalya, Turkey with Àlex Martí Pujolràs, defeating Tuna Altuna and Arthur Reymond in straight sets. Alcalá Gurri was granted another wildcard in the qualifying draw of the 2023 Barcelona Open, but lost to seeded player Geoffrey Blancaneaux in the first round.

In March 2024, Alcalá Gurri defeated Czech player Dominik Kellovsky in two tiebreak sets in his first final at the M15 Antalya, Turkey. He was also given a third wildcard in the qualifying draw at the 2024 Barcelona Open, but lost to in the first round against Duje Ajduković. In June 2024, he won his maiden M25 final in Rabat, Morocco, against Carlos López Montagud in straight sets. His first doubles M25 final was only a month later at Getxo, Spain, where he was partnered with Àlex Martí Pujolràs but lost against the French duo of Louis Dussin and Matt Ponchet in straight sets.

=== 2025-2026: First ATP Challenger titles, top 150 ===
In the first quarter of 2025, he competed in four ITF Finals, but only won one of them, M15 Valencia. His only other final of any kind was at ITF Madrid in December, winning against Ștefan Paloși in straight sets.

On the ATP Tour level he was granted a fourth wildcard in the qualifying of the 2025 Barcelona Open, and a fifth in 2026 at the same event but lost in the first round against third seed Damir Džumhur and seventh seed Alexandre Müller respectively.

After being close to winning three ITF titles in the span of two months in the season, he won his first one of 2026 in M25 Castelldefels, Spain, against Johan Nikles in straight sets.

In May, he won his maiden ATP Challenger singles title at the 2026 Challenger Città di Cervia, defeating top seed Andrea Guerrieri in the semifinals and sixth seed Buvaysar Gadamauri in the final and reached a new career-high ranking in the top 300 of world No. 277 on 25 May 2026. A month later he won his second title, at the Royan Atlantique Open, defeating Cosme Rolland de Ravel, followed by lifting the Serena Wines 1881 Acqua Maniva Tennis Cup in Cordenons and reached the top 200 on 20 July 2026.

He won his fifth title of the year and fourth at the Challenger level at the 2026 Plovdiv Challenger IV, and reached the top 150 on 28 September 2026.

== ATP Challenger and ITF Tour finals ==
=== Singles: 19 (10–9) ===
Legend (singles) ATP Challenger Tour (4–0) ITF World Tennis Tour (6–9)	Finals by surface Hard (0–0) Clay (10–9) Grass (0–0)

Result	W–L	Date	Tournament	Tier	Surface	Opponent	Score
Win	1–0	Sep 2022	M15 Sabadell, Spain	World Tennis Tour	Clay	(Spain) Álvaro López San Martín	6–4, 6–1
Loss	1–1	Sep 2023	M15 Melilla, Spain	World Tennis Tour	Clay	(Spain) Alejo Sánchez Quílez	6–4, 0–6, 1–6
Loss	1–2	Dec 2023	M15, Antalya, Turkey	World Tennis Tour	Clay	(Kazakhstan) Dmitry Popko	4–6, 5–7
Win	2–2	Mar 2024	M15, Antalya, Turkey	World Tennis Tour	Clay	(Czech Republic) Dominik Kellovsky	7–6^{(7–3)}, 7–6^{(7–5)}
Win	3–2	Jun 2024	M25, Rabat, Morocco	World Tennis Tour	Clay	(Spain) Carlos López Montagud	6–2, 6–3
Loss	3–3	Nov 2024	M15 Valencia, Spain	World Tennis Tour	Clay	(Spain) Pol Martín Tiffon	2–6, 2–6
Win	4–3	Feb 2025	M15 Valencia, Spain	World Tennis Tour	Clay	(Italy) Gabriele Pennaforti	3–6, 6–4, 6–4
Loss	4–4	Feb 2025	M15 Valencia, Spain	World Tennis Tour	Clay	(Spain) Carlos Sánchez Jover	4–2 ret.
Loss	4–5	Mar 2025	M15 Antalya, Turkey	World Tennis Tour	Clay	(Croatia) Luka Mikrut	3–6, 6–7^{(4–7)}
Loss	4–6	Apr 2025	M25 Santa Margherita di Pula, Italy	World Tennis Tour	Clay	(Italy) Gabriele Piraino	3–6, 4–6
Win	5–6	Dec 2025	M15 Madrid, Spain	World Tennis Tour	Clay	(Romania) Ștefan Paloși	6–2, 6–4
Loss	5–7	Feb 2026	M25 Antalya, Turkey	World Tennis Tour	Clay	(Romania) Gabi Adrian Boitan	4–6, 6–7^{(1–7)}
Loss	5–8	Feb 2026	M25 Antalya, Turkey	World Tennis Tour	Clay	Andrey Chepelev	6–1, 4–6, 1–6
Loss	5–9	Mar 2026	M25 Reus, Spain	World Tennis Tour	Clay	(Spain) Àlex Martí Pujolràs	6–2, 5–7, 4–6
Win	6–9	Apr 2026	M25 Castelldefels, Spain	World Tennis Tour	Clay	(Switzerland) Johan Nikles	6–3, 6–1
Win	7–9	May 2026	Challenger Città di Cervia, Italy	ATP Challenger Tour	Clay	(Belgium) Buvaysar Gadamauri	2–6, 6–1, 6–1
Win	8–9	Jun 2026	Royan Atlantique Open, France	ATP Challenger Tour	Clay	(France) Cosme Rolland de Ravel	7–6^{(7–4)}, 6–1
Win	9–9	Jul 2026	2026 Serena Wines 1881 Cup, Cordenons, Italy	ATP Challenger Tour	Clay	(Italy) Federico Bondioli	6–2, 6–0
Win	10–9	Sep 2026	Plovdiv Challenger IV, Bulgaria	ATP Challenger Tour	Clay	(Czech Republic) Jonáš Forejtek	6–4, 6–2

=== Doubles: 5 (2–3) ===
Legend (singles) ATP Challenger Tour (0–0) ITF World Tennis Tour (2–3)	Finals by surface Hard (0–0) Clay (2–3) Grass (0–0)

Result	W–L	Date	Tournament	Tier	Surface	Teammate	Opponents	Score
Win	1–0	Jun 2022	M15 Wrocław, Poland	World Tennis Tour	Clay	(Spain) Bruno Pujol Navarro	(Czech Republic) Jiří Barnat (Czech Republic) Filip Duda	6–4, 7–5
Loss	1–1	Aug 2022	M15 Xàtiva, Spain	World Tennis Tour	Clay	(Spain) Bruno Pujol Navarro	(Spain) Alejandro García (Spain) Mario Mansilla Díez	2–6, 6–7 (2–7)
Win	2–1	Feb 2023	M15 Antalya, Turkey	World Tennis Tour	Clay	(Spain) Àlex Martí Pujolràs	(Turkey) Tuna Altuna (France) Arthur Reymond	6–4, 6–4
Loss	2–2	Jun 2023	M15 Casablanca, Morocco	World Tennis Tour	Clay	(Spain) Jorge Martínez Martínez	(Spain) Alejandro Manzanera Pertusa (Spain) Carles Hernández	4–6, 2–6
Loss	2–3	Jul 2024	M25 Getxo, Spain	World Tennis Tour	Clay	(Spain) Àlex Martí Pujolràs	(France) Louis Dussin (France) Matt Ponchet	6–7(4–7), 3–6
