= 2025 Montemar Challenger – Singles =

Singles
- 2025 Montemar Challenger

Final
- Champion: (Czech Republic) Zdeněk Kolář
- Runner-up: (Italy) Gianluca Cadenasso
- Score: 6–4, 6–4

Events
Singles	Doubles
- Montemar Challenger

Fabio Fognini was the defending champion but chose not to defend his title after retiring from professional tennis earlier in the year.

Zdeněk Kolář won the title after defeating Gianluca Cadenasso 6–4, 6–4 in the final.

== Seeds ==
1. (Spain) Carlos Taberner (second round)
2. (Argentina) Marco Trungelliti (semifinals)
3. (Denmark) Elmer Møller (quarterfinals)
4. (Spain) Daniel Mérida (second round)
5. (France) Clément Tabur (second round)
6. (Italy) Lorenzo Giustino (semifinals)
7. (Czech Republic) Zdeněk Kolář (champion)
8. (France) Geoffrey Blancaneaux (first round)

== Draw ==
Key

- Q = Qualifier
- WC = Wild card
- LL = Lucky loser
- Alt = Alternate
- ITF = ITF entry
- PR = Protected ranking
- SR = Special ranking
- SE = Special exempt
- JE = Junior exempt
- JR = Junior Accelerator Programme entrant
- CO = College Accelerator Programme entrant
- NG = Next Gen Accelerator Program entrant
- w/o = Walkover
- r = Retired
- d = Defaulted

=== Finals ===
Semifinals
6	(Italy) Lorenzo Giustino	1	6^{5}
Q	(Italy) Gianluca Cadenasso	6	7^{7}
7	(Czech Republic) Zdeněk Kolář	3	6	6
2	(Argentina) Marco Trungelliti	6	3	3

Final
Q	(Italy) Gianluca Cadenasso	4	4
7	(Czech Republic) Zdeněk Kolář	6	6

=== Top half ===
First round
1	(Spain) C Taberner	6	6
Q	(Romania) Ștefan Paloși	0	1
I Gakhov	6	6
PR	(Bulgaria) A Andreev	3	3
(Spain) C Sánchez Jover	4	6^{3}
(Spain) M Damas	6	7^{7}
Q	(Italy) F Moroni	4	1
6	(Italy) L Giustino	6	6
4	(Spain) D Mérida	6	6
WC	(Spain) Alberto García García	3	0
(Italy) G Piraino	6	6
WC	(Switzerland) Adrien Burdet	4	4
(Poland) D Michalski	4	6	4
Q	(Italy) G Cadenasso	6	2	6
Q	Svyatoslav Gulin	2	7^{9}	4
5	(France) C Tabur	6	6^{7}	6

Second round
1	(Spain) C Taberner	4	6	3
I Gakhov	6	3	6
(Spain) M Damas	3	4
6	(Italy) L Giustino	6	6
4	(Spain) D Mérida	6	5	6^{6}
(Italy) G Piraino	3	7	7^{8}
Q	(Italy) G Cadenasso	7	7
5	(France) C Tabur	5	5

Quarterfinals
I Gakhov	0	7	2
6	(Italy) L Giustino	6	5	6
(Italy) G Piraino	0	2
Q	(Italy) G Cadenasso	6	6

Semifinals
6	(Italy) L Giustino	1	6^{5}
Q	(Italy) G Cadenasso	6	7^{7}

=== Bottom half ===
First round
7	(Czech Republic) Z Kolář	6	6
(Spain) J Barranco Cosano	4	2
(Spain) N Sánchez Izquierdo	6	6
(Italy) F Agamenone	3	0
(Lithuania) E Butvilas	2	4
Q	(Spain) M Alcalá Gurri	6	6
(Portugal) T Pereira	7	3	2
3	(Denmark) E Møller	5	6	6
8	(France) G Blancaneaux	3	4
WC	(Spain) A Santamarta Roig	6	6
Alt	(Bosnia and Herzegovina) A Nedić	6	6
(Spain) P Martín Tiffon	1	1
Q	(Romania) C Crețu	7^{7}	6
LL	(Italy) F Bondioli	6^{2}	3
(Romania) FC Jianu	5	7^{7}	4
2	(Argentina) M Trungelliti	7	6^{3}	6

Second round
7	(Czech Republic) Z Kolář	0	6	6
(Spain) N Sánchez Izquierdo	6	3	4
Q	(Spain) M Alcalá Gurri	4	3
3	(Denmark) E Møller	6	6
WC	(Spain) A Santamarta Roig	4	2
Alt	(Bosnia and Herzegovina) A Nedić	6	6
Q	(Romania) C Crețu	2	4
2	(Argentina) M Trungelliti	6	6

Quarterfinals
7	(Czech Republic) Z Kolář	6	6
3	(Denmark) E Møller	3	1
Alt	(Bosnia and Herzegovina) A Nedić	6	3	3
2	(Argentina) M Trungelliti	2	6	6

Semifinals
7	(Czech Republic) Z Kolář	3	6	6
2	(Argentina) M Trungelliti	6	3	3
