= 2025 Paraguay Open =

- Date: 17–23 March
- Edition: 2nd
- Surface: Clay
- Location: Asunción, Paraguay

Champions

Singles
- (United States) Emilio Nava

Doubles
- (United States) Vasil Kirkov / (Chile) Matías Soto
← 2024 ·	Paraguay Open	· 2026 →

The 2025 Paraguay Open, known as the Paraguay Open Babolat, was a professional tennis tournament played on clay courts. It was the second edition of the tournament which was part of the 2025 ATP Challenger Tour. It took place in Asunción, Paraguay between 17 and 23 March 2025.

== Singles main draw entrants ==
=== Seeds ===
Country	Player	Rank^{1}	Seed
BRA	Thiago Monteiro	105	1
COL	Daniel Elahi Galán	123	2
ARG	Román Andrés Burruchaga	136	3
CHI	Tomás Barrios Vera	153	4
ARG	Facundo Mena	188	5
PAR	Daniel Vallejo	195	6
PER	Juan Pablo Varillas	198	7
BOL	Murkel Dellien	199	8

- ^{1} Rankings are as of 3 March 2025.

=== Other entrants ===
The following players received wildcards into the singles main draw:

- (Brazil) Pedro Boscardin Dias
- (Paraguay) Hernando José Escurra Isnardi
- (Paraguay) Santino Núñez

The following players received entry from the qualifying draw:

- (United States) Felix Corwin
- (Brazil) Gustavo Ribeiro de Almeida
- (Peru) Conner Huertas del Pino
- (Argentina) Mariano Kestelboim
- (Argentina) Lorenzo Joaquín Rodríguez
- (Chile) Benjamín Torrealba

The following player received entry as a lucky loser:

- (Brazil) Igor Gimenez

== Champions ==
=== Singles ===
- (United States) Emilio Nava def. (Brazil) Thiago Monteiro 7–5, 6–3.

=== Doubles ===
- (United States) Vasil Kirkov / (Chile) Matías Soto def. (Argentina) Guillermo Durán / (Argentina) Mariano Kestelboim 6–3, 6–4.
