= 2026 Paraguay Open – Doubles =

Doubles
- 2026 Paraguay Open

Final
- Champions: (Argentina) Mariano Kestelboim (Brazil) Marcelo Zormann
- Runners-up: (United States) Mac Kiger (United States) Reese Stalder
- Score: 6–4, 7–5

Events
Singles	Doubles
- Paraguay Open

Vasil Kirkov and Matías Soto were the defending champions but chose not to defend their title.

Mariano Kestelboim and Marcelo Zormann won the title after defeating Mac Kiger and Reese Stalder 6–4, 7–5 in the final.

== Seeds ==
1. (United States) Mac Kiger / (United States) Reese Stalder (final)
2. (Argentina) Mariano Kestelboim / (Brazil) Marcelo Zormann (champions)
3. (Bolivia) Boris Arias / (Denmark) Johannes Ingildsen (first round)
4. (Uruguay) Ignacio Carou / (Argentina) Gonzalo Villanueva (first round)

== Draw ==
Key

- Q = Qualifier
- WC = Wild card
- LL = Lucky loser
- Alt = Alternate
- ITF = ITF entry
- PR = Protected ranking
- SR = Special ranking
- SE = Special exempt
- JE = Junior exempt
- JR = Junior Accelerator Programme entrant
- CO = College Accelerator Programme entrant
- NG = Next Gen Accelerator Program entrant
- w/o = Walkover
- r = Retired
- d = Defaulted

First round
1	(United States) M Kiger (United States) R Stalder	6	6
(Argentina) Valentín Basel (Argentina) F Ribero	2	1
(Argentina) GI Justo (Uruguay) F Roncadelli	1	6	[12]
Alt	(Argentina) V Aboian (Argentina) Carlos María Zárate	6	2	[10]
3	(Bolivia) B Arias (Denmark) J Ingildsen	6^{8}	2
(Brazil) L Britto (Brazil) Bruno Oliveira	7^{10}	6
WC	(Paraguay) Alexander Báez (Paraguay) Federico Gastón González Benítez	4	6^{5}
WC	(Paraguay) Hernando José Escurra Isnardi (Paraguay) Santino Núñez	6	7^{7}
(Brazil) P Boscardin Dias (Brazil) JL Reis da Silva
Alt	(Brazil) Breno Braga (Brazil) Victor Braga	w/o
(Peru) A Huertas del Pino (Peru) C Huertas del Pino	7	2	[14]
4	(Uruguay) I Carou (Argentina) G Villanueva	5	6	[12]
(Israel) D Cukierman (Brazil) PA Saraiva dos Santos	6	3	[10]
Alt	(Argentina) LE Ambrogi (Argentina) L Midón	3	6	[12]
(Italy) G Cadenasso (Brazil) Gabriel Roveri Sidney	6	3	[9]
2	(Argentina) M Kestelboim (Brazil) M Zormann	3	6	[11]

Quarterfinals
1	(United States) M Kiger (United States) R Stalder	w/o
(Argentina) GI Justo (Uruguay) F Roncadelli
(Brazil) L Britto (Brazil) B Oliveira	7	1	[10]
WC	(Paraguay) HJ Escurra Isnardi (Paraguay) S Núñez	5	6	[2]
Alt	(Brazil) B Braga (Brazil) V Braga	2	2
(Peru) A Huertas del Pino (Peru) C Huertas del Pino	6	6
Alt	(Argentina) LE Ambrogi (Argentina) L Midón
2	(Argentina) M Kestelboim (Brazil) M Zormann	w/o

Semifinals
1	(United States) M Kiger (United States) R Stalder	7^{7}	6
(Brazil) L Britto (Brazil) B Oliveira	6^{3}	4
(Peru) A Huertas del Pino (Peru) C Huertas del Pino	6^{6}	3
2	(Argentina) M Kestelboim (Brazil) M Zormann	7^{8}	6

Final
1	(United States) M Kiger (United States) R Stalder	4	5
2	(Argentina) M Kestelboim (Brazil) M Zormann	6	7
