= 2026 Trofeo Città di San Gregorio – Doubles =

Doubles
- 2026 Trofeo Città di San Gregorio

Final
- Champions: (Ukraine) Oleksandr Ovcharenko (Germany) Kai Wehnelt
- Runners-up: (Spain) Ignasi Forcano (Morocco) Younes Lalami
- Score: 6–4, 6–2

Events
Singles	Doubles
- Trofeo Città di San Gregorio

This was the first edition of the tournament as an ATP Challenger Tour event.

Oleksandr Ovcharenko and Kai Wehnelt won the title after defeating Ignasi Forcano and Younes Lalami 6–4, 6–2 in the final.

== Seeds ==
1. (Czech Republic) Dominik Reček / (Czech Republic) Daniel Siniakov (first round)
2. (Venezuela) Juan José Bianchi / (Australia) Kody Pearson (semifinals)
3. (Ukraine) Oleksandr Ovcharenko / (Germany) Kai Wehnelt (champions)
4. (Spain) Ignasi Forcano / (Morocco) Younes Lalami (final)

== Draw ==
Key

- Q = Qualifier
- WC = Wild card
- LL = Lucky loser
- Alt = Alternate
- ITF = ITF entry
- PR = Protected ranking
- SR = Special ranking
- SE = Special exempt
- JE = Junior exempt
- JR = Junior Accelerator Programme entrant
- CO = College Accelerator Programme entrant
- NG = Next Gen Accelerator Program entrant
- w/o = Walkover
- r = Retired
- d = Defaulted

First round
1	(Czech Republic) D Reček (Czech Republic) D Siniakov	6	3	[5]
(Austria) S Kopp (Bulgaria) Y Milev	4	6	[10]
(Spain) O Roca Batalla (Spain) C Sánchez Jover
(Spain) Izan Almazán Valiente; Pavel Lagutin	w/o
4	(Spain) Ignasi Forcano (Morocco) Y Lalami	w/o
WC	(Italy) Simone Consolo (Italy) Paolo Gabriele Marino
(Republic of Ireland) C Barry (Spain) P Vives Marcos	6	6
(Sweden) Oliver Johansson (Cyprus) E Neos	4	3
(Italy) M Ribecai (Italy) Gabriele Volpi	3	2
(Greece) D Sakellaridis (Germany) John Sperle	6	6
(Italy) Lorenzo Angelini (Italy) Sebastiano Cocola	4	1
3	(Ukraine) O Ovcharenko (Germany) K Wehnelt	6	6
(India) J Nedunchezhiyan (United States) B Suarez	7^{7}	6
(France) Marko Marić (Serbia) Tadija Radovanović	6^{1}	1
(Bulgaria) R Shandarov (Bulgaria) V Shandarov	1	1
2	(Venezuela) Juan José Bianchi (Australia) K Pearson	6	6

Quarterfinals
(Austria) S Kopp (Bulgaria) Y Milev	6^{7}	6	[7]
(Spain) I Almazán Valiente; P Lagutin	7^{9}	3	[10]
4	(Spain) I Forcano (Morocco) Y Lalami	w/o
(Republic of Ireland) C Barry (Spain) P Vives Marcos
(Greece) D Sakellaridis (Germany) J Sperle	6	2	[8]
3	(Ukraine) O Ovcharenko (Germany) K Wehnelt	4	6	[10]
(India) J Nedunchezhiyan (United States) B Suarez	5	6	[6]
2	(Venezuela) JJ Bianchi (Australia) K Pearson	7	4	[10]

Semifinals
(Spain) I Almazán Valiente; P Lagutin	0	6^{4}
4	(Spain) I Forcano (Morocco) Y Lalami	6	7^{7}
3	(Ukraine) O Ovcharenko (Germany) K Wehnelt	6	6
2	(Venezuela) JJ Bianchi (Australia) K Pearson	1	1

Final
4	(Spain) I Forcano (Morocco) Y Lalami	4	2
3	(Ukraine) O Ovcharenko (Germany) K Wehnelt	6	6
