= 2026 Trofeo Città di San Gregorio =

- Date: 12 – 18 October
- Edition: 1st
- Surface: Clay
- Location: San Gregorio di Catania, Italy

Champions

Singles
- (Italy) Gianluca Cadenasso

Doubles
- (Ukraine) Oleksandr Ovcharenko / (Germany) Kai Wehnelt
- Trofeo Città di San Gregorio

The 2026 Trofeo TS Monte Kà Tira - Città di San Gregorio was a professional tennis tournament played on clay courts. It was the first edition of the tournament as part of the ATP Challenger Tour. It took place in San Gregorio di Catania, Italy from 12 to 18 October 2026.

== Singles main-draw entrants ==
=== Seeds ===
Country	Player	Rank^{1}	Seed
ITA	Marco Cecchinato	163	1
CZE	Zdeněk Kolář	196	2
ITA	Gianluca Cadenasso	220	3
GBR	Felix Gill	222	4
GBR	Henry Searle	228	5
GER	Marvin Möller	239	6
BEL	Buvaysar Gadamauri	271	7
ITA	Michele Ribecai	282	8

- ^{1} Rankings are as of 5 October 2026.

=== Other entrants ===
The following players received wildcards into the singles main draw:

- (Italy) Federico Bondioli
- (Italy) Carlo Alberto Caniato
- (Italy) Luca Potenza

The following player received entry into the singles main draw through the Next Gen Accelerator programme:

- (Spain) Izan Almazán Valiente

The following players received entry into the singles main draw as alternates:

- (Italy) Massimo Giunta
- (Italy) Gabriele Piraino
- (Germany) Max Wiskandt

The following players received entry from the qualifying draw:

- Svyatoslav Gulin
- (Italy) Federico Iannaccone
- Pavel Lagutin
- (Czech Republic) Daniel Siniakov
- (Spain) Pedro Vives Marcos
- (Germany) Kai Wehnelt

== Champions ==
=== Singles ===
- (Italy) Gianluca Cadenasso def. (Romania) Radu Mihai Papoe 6–4, 3–6, 6–4.

=== Doubles ===
- (Ukraine) Oleksandr Ovcharenko / (Germany) Kai Wehnelt def. (Spain) Ignasi Forcano / (Morocco) Younes Lalami 6–4, 6–2.
