= 2026 Montemar Challenger – Singles =

Singles
- 2026 Montemar Challenger

Final
- Champion: (Spain) Pablo Llamas Ruiz
- Runner-up: (Spain) Pablo Carreño Busta
- Score: 6–4, 6–2

Events
| Singles | Doubles |
- Montemar Challenger

Zdeněk Kolář was the defending champion but lost in the first round to Alejandro Moro Cañas.

Pablo Llamas Ruiz won the title after defeating Pablo Carreño Busta 6–4, 6–2 in the final.

== Seeds ==
1. (Austria) Sebastian Ofner (semifinals)
2. (Netherlands) Jesper de Jong (second round)
3. (Lithuania) Vilius Gaubas (second round)
4. (Spain) Pedro Martínez (quarterfinals)
5. (Spain) Pablo Carreño Busta (final)
6. (Denmark) Elmer Møller (withdrew)
7. (United Kingdom) Jan Choinski (second round)
8. (Serbia) Dušan Lajović (first round)

== Draw ==
Key

- Q = Qualifier
- WC = Wild card
- LL = Lucky loser
- Alt = Alternate
- ITF = ITF entry
- PR = Protected ranking
- SR = Special ranking
- SE = Special exempt
- JE = Junior exempt
- JR = Junior Accelerator Programme entrant
- CO = College Accelerator Programme entrant
- NG = Next Gen Accelerator Program entrant
- w/o = Walkover
- r = Retired
- d = Defaulted

=== Finals ===
Semifinals
1 | (Austria) Sebastian Ofner | 6 | 3 | 4
5 | (Spain) Pablo Carreño Busta | 3 | 6 | 6
Roman Safiullin | 4 | 5
(Spain) Pablo Llamas Ruiz | 6 | 7

Final
5 | (Spain) Pablo Carreño Busta | 4 | 2
(Spain) Pablo Llamas Ruiz | 6 | 6

=== Top half ===
First round
1 | (Austria) S Ofner | 6 | 6
(Kazakhstan) T Skatov | 3 | 4
(Czech Republic) Z Kolář | 4 | 6 | 0
(Spain) A Moro Cañas | 6 | 2 | 6
I Gakhov | 3 | 0^{r}
(South Africa) L Harris | 6 | 0
(Italy) M Cecchinato | 7 | 6
8/WC | (Serbia) D Lajović | 5 | 3
4 | (Spain) P Martínez | 6 | 6
WC | (Spain) C Sánchez Jover | 3 | 2
(Switzerland) R Bertola | 6 | 6
LL | (Lebanon) B Hassan | 3 | 2
Q | (Spain) A Sánchez Quílez | 6 | 6
WC | (Spain) I Montes de la Torre | 3 | 0
Q | Svyatoslav Gulin | 5 | 1
5 | (Spain) P Carreño Busta | 7 | 6

Second round
1 | (Austria) S Ofner | 7^{7} | 6
(Spain) A Moro Cañas | 6^{5} | 4
(South Africa) L Harris | 2 | 1
(Italy) M Cecchinato | 6 | 6
4 | (Spain) P Martínez | 4 | 6 | 6
(Switzerland) R Bertola | 6 | 0 | 1
Q | (Spain) A Sánchez Quílez | 6 | 5 | 3
5 | (Spain) P Carreño Busta | 3 | 7 | 6

Quarterfinals
1 | (Austria) S Ofner | 7^{8} | 7
(Italy) M Cecchinato | 6^{6} | 5
4 | (Spain) P Martínez | 4 | 6 | 4
5 | (Spain) P Carreño Busta | 6 | 4 | 6

Semifinals
1 | (Austria) S Ofner | 6 | 3 | 4
5 | (Spain) P Carreño Busta | 3 | 6 | 6

=== Bottom half ===
First round
7 | (United Kingdom) J Choinski | 6 | 6
Q | (Portugal) T Pereira | 1 | 2
R Safiullin | 6 | 6
(Belgium) GA Bailly | 1 | 4
(Spain) D Mérida | 6 | 3 | 4
(Netherlands) M Houkes | 3 | 6 | 6
LL | (Jordan) A Shelbayh | 7^{8} | 6^{4} | 1
3 | (Lithuania) V Gaubas | 6^{6} | 7^{7} | 6
Q | I Ivashka | 3 | 4
(Spain) P Llamas Ruiz | 6 | 6
Q | (United States) Dali Blanch | 6 | 6
(Germany) J Engel | 2 | 1
(Lithuania) E Butvilas | 6 | 6
(Spain) P Martín Tiffon | 3 | 3
Q | (Italy) S Pieri | 7 | 1 | 6^{2}
2 | (Netherlands) J de Jong | 5 | 6 | 7^{7}

Second round
7 | (United Kingdom) J Choinski | 2 | 3
R Safiullin | 6 | 6
(Netherlands) M Houkes | 6^{7} | 6 | 7^{7}
3 | (Lithuania) V Gaubas | 7^{9} | 4 | 6^{4}
(Spain) P Llamas Ruiz | 6 | 6
Q | (United States) Dal Blanch | 1 | 2
(Lithuania) E Butvilas | 7 | 2 | 6
2 | (Netherlands) J de Jong | 5 | 6 | 4

Quarterfinals
R Safiullin | 6 | 6
(Netherlands) M Houkes | 4 | 1
(Spain) P Llamas Ruiz | 6 | 6
(Lithuania) E Butvilas | 1 | 2

Semifinals
R Safiullin | 4 | 5
(Spain) P Llamas Ruiz | 6 | 7
