= 2025 Montemar Challenger – Doubles =

Doubles
- 2025 Montemar Challenger

Final
- Champions: (Sweden) Erik Grevelius (Sweden) Adam Heinonen
- Runners-up: (Italy) Federico Bondioli (Italy) Gianluca Cadenasso
- Score: 6–3, 6–3

Events
Singles	Doubles
- Montemar Challenger

Karol Drzewiecki and Piotr Matuszewski were the defending champions but chose not to defend their title.

Erik Grevelius and Adam Heinonen won the title after defeating Federico Bondioli and Gianluca Cadenasso 6–3, 6–3 in the final.

== Seeds ==
1. (Romania) Alexandru Jecan / (Romania) Bogdan Pavel (quarterfinals)
2. (Spain) Sergio Martos Gornés / (Spain) David Vega Hernández (first round)
3. (France) Geoffrey Blancaneaux / (Czech Republic) Zdeněk Kolář (quarterfinals)
4. (Czech Republic) Jiří Barnat / (Czech Republic) Filip Duda (semifinals)

== Draw ==
Key

- Q = Qualifier
- WC = Wild card
- LL = Lucky loser
- Alt = Alternate
- ITF = ITF entry
- PR = Protected ranking
- SR = Special ranking
- SE = Special exempt
- JE = Junior exempt
- JR = Junior Accelerator Programme entrant
- CO = College Accelerator Programme entrant
- NG = Next Gen Accelerator Program entrant
- w/o = Walkover
- r = Retired
- d = Defaulted

First round
1	(Romania) A Jecan (Romania) B Pavel	6	6
(Italy) F Agamenone (Spain) N Sánchez Izquierdo	3	4
(Italy) F Bondioli (Italy) G Cadenasso	6	6
(Czech Republic) J Jermář (Portugal) T Pereira	3	4
4	(Czech Republic) Jiří Barnat (Czech Republic) F Duda	5	6	[11]
I Gakhov (Romania) FC Jianu	7	1	[9]
Alt	(Romania) C Crețu (Romania) Ștefan Paloși	6	6
WC	(Spain) J Barranco Cosano (Lithuania) E Butvilas	4	4
PR	(Bulgaria) A Andreev (Czech Republic) J Forejtek	2	2
(Sweden) E Grevelius (Sweden) A Heinonen	6	6
WC	(Spain) Juan Escabias; Pavel Petrov	1	2
3	(France) G Blancaneaux (Czech Republic) Z Kolář	6	6
(Spain) M Damas (Spain) D Mérida	4	3
(Spain) M Mansilla Díez (Spain) B Pujol Navarro	6	6
(Serbia) I Sabanov (Serbia) M Sabanov	6	6
2	(Spain) S Martos Gornés (Spain) D Vega Hernández	2	3

Quarterfinals
1	(Romania) A Jecan (Romania) B Pavel	6	6^{7}	[11]
(Italy) F Bondioli (Italy) G Cadenasso	3	7^{9}	[13]
4	(Czech Republic) J Barnat (Czech Republic) F Duda	7	6
Alt	(Romania) C Crețu (Romania) Ș Paloși	5	4
(Sweden) E Grevelius (Sweden) A Heinonen	6	6
3	(France) G Blancaneaux (Czech Republic) Z Kolář	2	3
(Spain) M Mansilla Díez (Spain) B Pujol Navarro	7^{7}	3	[7]
(Serbia) I Sabanov (Serbia) M Sabanov	6^{3}	6	[10]

Semifinals
(Italy) F Bondioli (Italy) G Cadenasso	6	4	[10]
4	(Czech Republic) J Barnat (Czech Republic) F Duda	3	6	[8]
(Sweden) E Grevelius (Sweden) A Heinonen	7^{12}	6
(Serbia) I Sabanov (Serbia) M Sabanov	6^{10}	4

Final
(Italy) F Bondioli (Italy) G Cadenasso	3	3
(Sweden) E Grevelius (Sweden) A Heinonen	6	6
