= 2026 Trofeo Città di San Gregorio – Singles =

Singles
- 2026 Trofeo Città di San Gregorio

Final
- Champion: (Italy) Gianluca Cadenasso
- Runner-up: (Romania) Radu Mihai Papoe
- Score: 6–4, 3–6, 6–4

Events
Singles	Doubles
- Trofeo Città di San Gregorio

This was the first edition of the tournament as an ATP Challenger Tour event.

Gianluca Cadenasso won the title after defeating Radu Mihai Papoe 6–4, 3–6, 6–4 in the final.

== Seeds ==
1. (Italy) Marco Cecchinato (first round)
2. (Czech Republic) Zdeněk Kolář (quarterfinals)
3. (Italy) Gianluca Cadenasso (champion)
4. (United Kingdom) Felix Gill (semifinals)
5. (United Kingdom) Henry Searle (first round)
6. (Germany) Marvin Möller (quarterfinals)
7. (Belgium) Buvaysar Gadamauri (quarterfinals)
8. (Italy) Michele Ribecai (first round)

== Draw ==
Key

- Q = Qualifier
- WC = Wild card
- LL = Lucky loser
- Alt = Alternate
- ITF = ITF entry
- PR = Protected ranking
- SR = Special ranking
- SE = Special exempt
- JE = Junior exempt
- JR = Junior Accelerator Programme entrant
- CO = College Accelerator Programme entrant
- NG = Next Gen Accelerator Program entrant
- w/o = Walkover
- r = Retired
- d = Defaulted

=== Finals ===
Semifinals
Alt	(Italy) Massimo Giunta	2	3
3	(Italy) Gianluca Cadenasso	6	6
4	(United Kingdom) Felix Gill	4	5
(Romania) Radu Mihai Papoe	6	7

Final
3	(Italy) Gianluca Cadenasso	6	3	6
(Romania) Radu Mihai Papoe	4	6	4

=== Top half ===
First round
1	(Italy) M Cecchinato	4	4
Q	(Spain) P Vives Marcos	6	6
Alt	(Germany) M Wiskandt	0	7	6
(Spain) M Damas	6	5	4
(Belgium) M Geerts	4	1
Q	Pavel Lagutin	6	6
Alt	(Italy) Massimo Giunta	6^{7}	6	6
5	(United Kingdom) H Searle	7^{9}	2	2
3	(Italy) G Cadenasso	6^{8}	6	6
Q	(Germany) K Wehnelt	7^{10}	3	4
Q	Svyatoslav Gulin	7	6
(Italy) F Agamenone	5	2
WC	(Italy) CA Caniato	6	6
Q	(Czech Republic) D Siniakov	3	2
(Spain) C Sánchez Jover	6^{5}	3
6	(Germany) M Möller	7^{7}	6

Second round
Q	(Spain) P Vives Marcos	6	3	4
Alt	(Germany) M Wiskandt	3	6	6
Q	P Lagutin	5	3
Alt	(Italy) M Giunta	7	6
3	(Italy) G Cadenasso	7	6
Q	S Gulin	5	4
WC	(Italy) CA Caniato	4	6	2
6	(Germany) M Möller	6	3	6

Quarterfinals
Alt	(Germany) M Wiskandt	1	2
Alt	(Italy) M Giunta	6	6
3	(Italy) G Cadenasso	7	4	7^{7}
6	(Germany) M Möller	5	6	6^{5}

Semifinals
Alt	(Italy) M Giunta	2	3
3	(Italy) G Cadenasso	6	6

=== Bottom half ===
First round
7	(Belgium) B Gadamauri	2	7^{7}	6
(Austria) S Kopp	6	6^{3}	1
(Italy) E Dalla Valle	6	5	7^{7}
WC	(Italy) F Bondioli	1	7	6^{5}
(France) Sean Cuenin	7^{7}	3	3^{r}
NG	(Spain) Izan Almazán Valiente	6^{4}	6	4
Alt	(Italy) G Piraino	2	1
4	(United Kingdom) F Gill	6	6
8	(Italy) M Ribecai	3	4
(Romania) Radu Mihai Papoe	6	6
(Spain) O Roca Batalla	2	4
WC	(Italy) Luca Potenza	6	6
Q	(Italy) Federico Iannaccone	3	4
(Romania) FC Jianu	6	6
(Italy) F Forti	6^{5}	6	6^{5}
2	(Czech Republic) Z Kolář	7^{7}	2	7^{7}

Second round
7	(Belgium) B Gadamauri	1	6	6
(Italy) E Dalla Valle	6	3	2
NG	(Spain) I Almazán Valiente	4	1
4	(United Kingdom) F Gill	6	6
(Romania) RM Papoe	6	6
WC	(Italy) L Potenza	3	4
(Romania) FC Jianu	4	2
2	(Czech Republic) Z Kolář	6	6

Quarterfinals
7	(Belgium) B Gadamauri	4	7	4
4	(United Kingdom) F Gill	6	5	6
(Romania) RM Papoe	6	6
2	(Czech Republic) Z Kolář	4	2

Semifinals
4	(United Kingdom) F Gill	4	5
(Romania) RM Papoe	6	7
