= 2026 Maia Challenger – Singles =

Singles
- 2026 Maia Challenger

Final
- Champion: (Italy) Francesco Passaro
- Runner-up: (Hungary) Zsombor Piros
- Score: 4–6, 6–3, 6–2

Events
Singles	Doubles
- Maia Challenger

Elmer Møller was the defending champion but lost in the first round to Lukas Neumayer.

Francesco Passaro won the title after defeating Zsombor Piros 4–6, 6–3, 6–2 in the final.

== Seeds ==
1. (Argentina) Marco Trungelliti (quarterfinals)
2. (Portugal) Henrique Rocha (first round)
3. (Hungary) Zsombor Piros (final)
4. (Spain) Pedro Martínez (first round)
5. (Spain) Max Alcalá Gurri (first round)
6. (Lithuania) Vilius Gaubas (second round)
7. (Italy) Andrea Pellegrino (first round)
8. (Spain) Nikolás Sánchez Izquierdo (second round)

== Draw ==
Key

- Q = Qualifier
- WC = Wild card
- LL = Lucky loser
- Alt = Alternate
- ITF = ITF entry
- PR = Protected ranking
- SR = Special ranking
- SE = Special exempt
- JE = Junior exempt
- JR = Junior Accelerator Programme entrant
- CO = College Accelerator Programme entrant
- NG = Next Gen Accelerator Program entrant
- w/o = Walkover
- r = Retired
- d = Defaulted

=== Finals ===
Semifinals
(Italy) Francesco Passaro	5	6	6
(Croatia) Matej Dodig	7	1	4
3	(Hungary) Zsombor Piros	6	6
Q	(Spain) Alejo Sánchez Quílez	4	4

Final
(Italy) Francesco Passaro	4	6	6
3	(Hungary) Zsombor Piros	6	3	2

=== Top half ===
First round
1	(Argentina) M Trungelliti	4	6	6
(Brazil) T Monteiro	6	1	4
Q	(Germany) F Broska	3	4
Q	(Slovakia) M Karol	6	6
(Italy) F Passaro	6	6
WC	(Portugal) T Torres	3	0
Q	(Slovakia) A Martin	4	4
8	(Spain) N Sánchez Izquierdo	6	6
4	(Spain) P Martínez	2	1
(Croatia) M Dodig	6	6
(Denmark) E Møller	4	6	2
(Austria) L Neumayer	6	4	6
(United States) T Boyer	6	6
(Spain) A Moro Cañas	4	2
(Belgium) K Coppejans	3	4
6	(Lithuania) V Gaubas	6	6

Second round
1	(Argentina) M Trungelliti	6	6
Q	(Slovakia) M Karol	2	0
(Italy) F Passaro	7^{7}	7^{8}
8	(Spain) N Sánchez Izquierdo	6^{2}	6^{6}
(Croatia) M Dodig	6	4	6
(Austria) L Neumayer	4	6	3
(United States) T Boyer	6	4	6
6	(Lithuania) V Gaubas	3	6	4

Quarterfinals
1	(Argentina) M Trungelliti	6	5	6^{5}
(Italy) F Passaro	2	7	7^{7}
(Croatia) M Dodig	6	7^{7}
(United States) T Boyer	4	6^{4}

Semifinals
(Italy) F Passaro	5	6	6
(Croatia) M Dodig	7	1	4

=== Bottom half ===
First round
7	(Italy) A Pellegrino	4	6	1
(Italy) L Giustino	6	2	6
Q	(Czech Republic) M Vrbenský	6	6
(Italy) R Brancaccio	3	1
(Spain) P Martín Tiffon	6	6
WC	(Portugal) Francisco Rocha	4	2
Q	(Lebanon) B Hassan	3	2
3	(Hungary) Z Piros	6	6
5	(Spain) M Alcalá Gurri	3	4
Q	(Spain) A Sánchez Quílez	6	6
(Bosnia and Herzegovina) A Nedić	7^{7}	6
Alt	(Italy) F Romano	6^{2}	3
WC	(Portugal) T Pereira	0	3
(Croatia) L Mikrut	6	6
(India) S Nagal	3	7	7^{7}
2	(Portugal) H Rocha	6	5	6^{5}

Second round
(Italy) L Giustino	7	7
Q	(Czech Republic) M Vrbenský	5	5
(Spain) P Martín Tiffon	3	2
3	(Hungary) Z Piros	6	6
Q	(Spain) A Sánchez Quílez	6	6
(Bosnia and Herzegovina) A Nedić	3	4
(Croatia) L Mikrut	6	6
(India) S Nagal	4	2

Quarterfinals
(Italy) L Giustino	3	6	6^{5}
3	(Hungary) Z Piros	6	1	7^{7}
Q	(Spain) A Sánchez Quílez	6	6
(Croatia) L Mikrut	1	4

Semifinals
3	(Hungary) Z Piros	6	6
Q	(Spain) A Sánchez Quílez	4	4
