= 2024 Paraguay Open – Singles =

Singles
- 2024 Paraguay Open

Final
- Champion: (Brazil) Gustavo Heide
- Runner-up: (Brazil) João Fonseca
- Score: 7–5, 6–7^{(6–8)}, 6–1

Events
Singles	Doubles
- Paraguay Open

This was the first edition of the tournament.

Gustavo Heide won the title after defeating João Fonseca 7–5, 6–7^{(6–8)}, 6–1 in the final.

== Seeds ==
1. (Peru) Juan Pablo Varillas (semifinals)
2. (Argentina) Román Andrés Burruchaga (semifinals)
3. (Bolivia) Hugo Dellien (second round)
4. (Argentina) Genaro Alberto Olivieri (first round)
5. (Portugal) Gonçalo Oliveira (first round)
6. (France) Geoffrey Blancaneaux (first round)
7. (France) Enzo Couacaud (first round)
8. (Brazil) Gustavo Heide (champion)

== Draw ==
Key

- Q = Qualifier
- WC = Wild card
- LL = Lucky loser
- Alt = Alternate
- ITF = ITF entry
- PR = Protected ranking
- SR = Special ranking
- SE = Special exempt
- JE = Junior exempt
- JR = Junior Accelerator Programme entrant
- CO = College Accelerator Programme entrant
- NG = Next Gen Accelerator Program entrant
- w/o = Walkover
- r = Retired
- d = Defaulted

=== Finals ===
Semifinals
1	(Peru) Juan Pablo Varillas	4	2
8	(Brazil) Gustavo Heide	6	6
(Brazil) João Fonseca	7^{7}	1	6
2	(Argentina) Román Andrés Burruchaga	6^{5}	6	3

Final
8	(Brazil) Gustavo Heide	7	6^{6}	6
(Brazil) João Fonseca	5	7^{8}	1

=== Top half ===
First round
1	(Peru) JP Varillas	1	6	6
WC	(Bolivia) JC Prado Ángelo	6	3	1
Q	(Argentina) G Villanueva	3	4
Q	(Brazil) Nicolas Zanellato	6	6
Q	(Israel) D Cukierman	2	2
(Peru) G Bueno	6	6
(Argentina) FA Gómez	6	6
5	(Portugal) G Oliveira	1	4
3	(Bolivia) H Dellien	6	6
(Brazil) JL Reis da Silva	3	2
Q	(Argentina) JB Torres	4	4
(Italy) Alexander Weis	6	6
(Spain) C Sánchez Jover	3	4
(Brazil) P Sakamoto	6	6
Q	(Argentina) V Aboian	7^{7}	3	2
8	(Brazil) G Heide	6^{5}	6	6

Second round
1	(Peru) JP Varillas	6	6
Q	(Brazil) N Zanellato	1	3
(Peru) G Bueno	5	3
(Argentina) FA Gómez	7	6
3	(Bolivia) H Dellien	4	0
(Italy) A Weis	6	6
(Brazil) P Sakamoto	1	3
8	(Brazil) G Heide	6	6

Quarterfinals
1	(Peru) JP Varillas	6	7
(Argentina) FA Gómez	3	5
(Italy) A Weis	3	6^{3}
8	(Brazil) G Heide	6	7^{7}

Semifinals
1	(Peru) JP Varillas	4	2
8	(Brazil) G Heide	6	6

=== Bottom half ===
First round
6	(France) G Blancaneaux	6	3	4
(Brazil) M Pucinelli de Almeida	3	6	6
(Brazil) O Luz	6^{1}	7	6
(Canada) L Draxl	7^{7}	5	4
(Ecuador) Á Guillén Meza	6	2	4
(Brazil) J Fonseca	3	6	6
WC	(Paraguay) Hernando José Escurra Isnardi	4	6	6
4	(Argentina) GA Olivieri	6	4	3
7	(France) E Couacaud	5	6	3
Q	(Argentina) Lorenzo Joaquín Rodríguez	7	4	6
(Italy) G Mager	6	6
(Australia) P Sekulic	3	1
(Argentina) R Olivo	6	3	4^{r}
WC	(Paraguay) AD Vallejo	3	6	5
(Argentina) A Collarini	4	4
2	(Argentina) RA Burruchaga	6	6

Second round
(Brazil) M Pucinelli de Almeida	5	1
(Brazil) O Luz	7	6
(Brazil) J Fonseca	6	6
WC	(Paraguay) HJ Escurra Isnardi	3	4
Q	(Argentina) LJ Rodríguez	2	3
(Italy) G Mager	6	6
WC	(Paraguay) AD Vallejo	4	7^{7}	2
2	(Argentina) RA Burruchaga	6	6^{4}	6

Quarterfinals
(Brazil) O Luz	6	6^{4}	2
(Brazil) J Fonseca	3	7^{7}	6
(Italy) G Mager	6	3	4
2	(Argentina) RA Burruchaga	4	6	6

Semifinals
(Brazil) J Fonseca	7^{7}	1	6
2	(Argentina) RA Burruchaga	6^{5}	6	3
