= 2026 Montemar Challenger – Doubles =

Doubles
- 2026 Montemar Challenger

Final
- Champions: (Poland) Szymon Kielan (Portugal) Tiago Pereira
- Runners-up: (Colombia) Nicolás Barrientos (Uruguay) Ariel Behar
- Score: 4–6, 6–3, [15–13]

Events
Singles	Doubles
- Montemar Challenger

Erik Grevelius and Adam Heinonen were the defending champions but chose not to defend their title.

Szymon Kielan and Tiago Pereira won the title after defeating Nicolás Barrientos and Ariel Behar 4–6, 6–3, [15–13] in the final.

== Seeds ==
1. (New Zealand) Finn Reynolds / (New Zealand) James Watt (first round)
2. (United Kingdom) Joshua Paris / (United Kingdom) Marcus Willis (first round)
3. (Colombia) Nicolás Barrientos / (Uruguay) Ariel Behar (final)
4. (United States) George Goldhoff / (Poland) Filip Pieczonka (first round)

== Draw ==
Key

- Q = Qualifier
- WC = Wild card
- LL = Lucky loser
- Alt = Alternate
- ITF = ITF entry
- PR = Protected ranking
- SR = Special ranking
- SE = Special exempt
- JE = Junior exempt
- JR = Junior Accelerator Programme entrant
- CO = College Accelerator Programme entrant
- NG = Next Gen Accelerator Program entrant
- w/o = Walkover
- r = Retired
- d = Defaulted

First round
1	(New Zealand) F Reynolds (New Zealand) J Watt	6	4	[8]
WC	(Lithuania) E Butvilas (Lithuania) Dominykas Stonkus	3	6	[10]
WC	(India) Raghav Harsh (France) F Martin	4	2
(Poland) S Kielan (Portugal) T Pereira	6	6
4	(United States) G Goldhoff (Poland) F Pieczonka	6^{4}	2
I Liutarevich (Spain) B Pujol Navarro	7^{7}	6
(Romania) A Jecan (Japan) S Watanabe	5	6^{2}
(Poland) K Drzewiecki (Poland) P Matuszewski	7	7^{7}
(Spain) S Martos Gornés (India) VSP Natarajan	6	6^{3}	[7]
(Czech Republic) A Paulson (Czech Republic) M Vrbenský	4	7^{7}	[10]
(Peru) A Merino (Germany) C Negritu	5	4
3	(Colombia) N Barrientos (Uruguay) A Behar	7	6
(Spain) Í Cervantes (Romania) V Cornea	6	4	[5]
(Ukraine) D Molchanov (Romania) B Pavel	3	6	[10]
(Netherlands) J de Jong (Netherlands) M Houkes	7	3	[10]
2	(United Kingdom) J Paris (United Kingdom) M Willis	5	6	[6]

Quarterfinals
WC	(Lithuania) E Butvilas (Lithuania) D Stonkus	2	1
(Poland) S Kielan (Portugal) T Pereira	6	6
I Liutarevich (Spain) B Pujol Navarro	w/o
(Poland) K Drzewiecki (Poland) P Matuszewski
(Czech Republic) A Paulson (Czech Republic) M Vrbenský	4	6^{4}
3	(Colombia) N Barrientos (Uruguay) A Behar	6	7^{7}
(Ukraine) D Molchanov (Romania) B Pavel	w/o
(Netherlands) J de Jong (Netherlands) M Houkes

Semifinals
(Poland) S Kielan (Portugal) T Pereira	6	6
I Liutarevich (Spain) B Pujol Navarro	3	4
3	(Colombia) N Barrientos (Uruguay) A Behar	7^{7}	7^{7}
(Ukraine) D Molchanov (Romania) B Pavel	6^{0}	6^{3}

Final
(Poland) S Kielan (Portugal) T Pereira	4	6	[15]
3	(Colombia) N Barrientos (Uruguay) A Behar	6	3	[13]
