= 2024 Paraguay Open – Doubles =

Doubles
- 2024 Paraguay Open

Final
- Champions: (Bolivia) Boris Arias (Bolivia) Federico Zeballos
- Runners-up: (Peru) Gonzalo Bueno (Ecuador) Álvaro Guillén Meza
- Score: 6–2, 6–2

Events
Singles	Doubles
- Paraguay Open

This was the first edition of the tournament.

Boris Arias and Federico Zeballos won the title after defeating Gonzalo Bueno and Álvaro Guillén Meza 6–2, 6–2 in the final.

== Seeds ==
1. (Bolivia) Boris Arias / (Bolivia) Federico Zeballos (champions)
2. (Brazil) Marcelo Demoliner / (Brazil) Orlando Luz (quarterfinals)
3. (United States) Evan King / (New Zealand) Rubin Statham (first round)
4. (Brazil) Fernando Romboli / (Brazil) Marcelo Zormann (semifinals)

== Draw ==
Key

- Q = Qualifier
- WC = Wild card
- LL = Lucky loser
- Alt = Alternate
- ITF = ITF entry
- PR = Protected ranking
- SR = Special ranking
- SE = Special exempt
- JE = Junior exempt
- JR = Junior Accelerator Programme entrant
- CO = College Accelerator Programme entrant
- NG = Next Gen Accelerator Program entrant
- w/o = Walkover
- r = Retired
- d = Defaulted

=== Draw ===
First round
1	(Bolivia) B Arias (Bolivia) F Zeballos	6	6
(Spain) C Sánchez Jover (Japan) K Uchida	4	4
(Sweden) S Freund (Denmark) J Ingildsen	7^{11}	6
(France) G Blancaneaux (France) E Couacaud	6^{9}	2
4	(Brazil) F Romboli (Brazil) M Zormann	7	7^{8}
(Uruguay) I Carou (Peru) C Huertas del Pino	5	6^{6}
(Israel) D Cukierman (Argentina) M Kestelboim	6	6
WC	(Paraguay) AD Vallejo (Paraguay) Martín Antonio Vergara del Puerto	4	3
(Argentina) FA Gómez (Argentina) R Olivo	4	7^{8}	[8]
(Peru) G Bueno (Ecuador) Á Guillén Meza	6	6^{6}	[10]
(Portugal) G Oliveira (Australia) A Taylor	7^{7}	6
3	(United States) E King (New Zealand) R Statham	6^{4}	3
WC	(Paraguay) Thiago Drozdowski (Paraguay) Hernando José Escurra Isnardi	2	3
(Argentina) A Collarini (Argentina) GA Olivieri	6	6
(Canada) L Draxl (Italy) Alexander Weis	5	5
2	(Brazil) M Demoliner (Brazil) O Luz	7	7

Quarterfinals
1	(Bolivia) B Arias (Bolivia) F Zeballos	7^{7}	6
(Sweden) S Freund (Denmark) J Ingildsen	6^{3}	3
4	(Brazil) F Romboli (Brazil) M Zormann	6	6
(Israel) D Cukierman (Argentina) M Kestelboim	3	4
(Peru) G Bueno (Ecuador) Á Guillén Meza	6	7
(Portugal) G Oliveira (Australia) A Taylor	2	5
(Argentina) A Collarini (Argentina) GA Olivieri	6	6^{2}	[15]
2	(Brazil) M Demoliner (Brazil) O Luz	4	7^{7}	[13]

Semifinals
1	(Bolivia) B Arias (Bolivia) F Zeballos	6	1	[11]
4	(Brazil) F Romboli (Brazil) M Zormann	4	6	[9]
(Peru) G Bueno (Ecuador) Á Guillén Meza	7	3	[10]
(Argentina) A Collarini (Argentina) GA Olivieri	5	6	[5]

Final
1	(Bolivia) B Arias (Bolivia) F Zeballos	6	6
(Peru) G Bueno (Ecuador) Á Guillén Meza	2	2
