= 2024 Montemar Challenger – Doubles =

Doubles
- 2024 Montemar Challenger

Final
- Champions: (Poland) Karol Drzewiecki (Poland) Piotr Matuszewski
- Runners-up: (Spain) Daniel Rincón (Jordan) Abdullah Shelbayh
- Score: 6–3, 6–4

Events
Singles	Doubles
- Montemar Challenger

This was the first edition of the tournament.

Karol Drzewiecki and Piotr Matuszewski won the title after defeating Daniel Rincón and Abdullah Shelbayh 6–3, 6–4 in the final.

== Seeds ==
1. (Poland) Karol Drzewiecki / (Poland) Piotr Matuszewski (champions)
2. (Spain) David Vega Hernández / (Netherlands) Mick Veldheer (quarterfinals)
3. (Israel) Daniel Cukierman / Ivan Liutarevich (first round)
4. (Spain) Íñigo Cervantes / (Austria) David Pichler (first round)

== Draw ==
Key

- Q = Qualifier
- WC = Wild card
- LL = Lucky loser
- Alt = Alternate
- ITF = ITF entry
- PR = Protected ranking
- SR = Special ranking
- SE = Special exempt
- JE = Junior exempt
- JR = Junior Accelerator Programme entrant
- CO = College Accelerator Programme entrant
- NG = Next Gen Accelerator Program entrant
- w/o = Walkover
- r = Retired
- d = Defaulted

=== Draw ===
First round
1	(Poland) K Drzewiecki (Poland) P Matuszewski	6	6
WC	Pavel Petrov (India) Ayush Sharma	2	0
(Netherlands) Michiel de Krom (Netherlands) Ryan Nijboer	6	1	[10]
(Lithuania) E Butvilas (Lithuania) V Gaubas	2	6	[2]
3	(Israel) D Cukierman; I Liutarevich	7^{7}	6^{7}	[9]
(Spain) N Álvarez Varona (Spain) S Martos Gornés	6^{4}	7^{9}	[11]
WC	(Spain) Alberto García García (Spain) Iker Sevilla	2	2
(Serbia) I Sabanov (Serbia) M Sabanov	6	6
Alt	(Ukraine) Eric Vanshelboim (Kazakhstan) D Yevseyev	6	6
Alt	(Bulgaria) A Andreev (Moldova) E Matvievici	3	2
(Spain) D Rincón (Jordan) A Shelbayh	3	6	[10]
4	(Spain) Í Cervantes (Austria) D Pichler	6	3	[7]
(Ukraine) O Ovcharenko (Spain) C Sánchez Jover	3	7^{8}	[10]
(Romania) A Jecan (Italy) G Ricca	6	6^{6}	[1]
(Spain) D Mérida (Spain) A Sánchez Quílez	5	6	[6]
2	(Spain) D Vega Hernández (Netherlands) M Veldheer	7	2	[10]

Quarterfinals
1	(Poland) K Drzewiecki (Poland) P Matuszewski	6	5	[10]
(Netherlands) M de Krom (Netherlands) R Nijboer	3	7	[6]
(Spain) N Álvarez Varona (Spain) S Martos Gornés	7	4	[4]
(Serbia) I Sabanov (Serbia) M Sabanov	5	6	[10]
Alt	(Ukraine) E Vanshelboim (Kazakhstan) D Yevseyev
(Spain) D Rincón (Jordan) A Shelbayh	w/o
(Ukraine) O Ovcharenko (Spain) C Sánchez Jover	6	6
2	(Spain) D Vega Hernández (Netherlands) M Veldheer	3	1

Semifinals
1	(Poland) K Drzewiecki (Poland) P Matuszewski	5	7^{14}	[10]
(Serbia) I Sabanov (Serbia) M Sabanov	7	6^{12}	[8]
(Spain) D Rincón (Jordan) A Shelbayh	5
(Ukraine) O Ovcharenko (Spain) C Sánchez Jover	2^{r}

Final
1	(Poland) K Drzewiecki (Poland) P Matuszewski	6	6
(Spain) D Rincón (Jordan) A Shelbayh	3	4
