= 2026 Paraguay Open – Singles =

Singles
- 2026 Paraguay Open

Final
- Champion: (Italy) Gianluca Cadenasso
- Runner-up: (Uruguay) Franco Roncadelli
- Score: 7–6^{(7–5)}, 6–0

Events
Singles	Doubles
- Paraguay Open

Emilio Nava was the defending champion but chose not to defend his title.

Gianluca Cadenasso won the title after defeating Franco Roncadelli 7–6^{(7–5)}, 6–0 in the final.

== Seeds ==
1. (Paraguay) Daniel Vallejo (second round)
2. (Portugal) Jaime Faria (quarterfinals)
3. (Portugal) Henrique Rocha (first round)
4. (Argentina) Alex Barrena (quarterfinals)
5. (Brazil) João Lucas Reis da Silva (quarterfinals)
6. (Ecuador) Álvaro Guillén Meza (first round)
7. (Bolivia) Juan Carlos Prado Ángelo (second round)
8. (Peru) Gonzalo Bueno (second round)

== Draw ==
Key

- Q = Qualifier
- WC = Wild card
- LL = Lucky loser
- Alt = Alternate
- ITF = ITF entry
- PR = Protected ranking
- SR = Special ranking
- SE = Special exempt
- JE = Junior exempt
- JR = Junior Accelerator Programme entrant
- CO = College Accelerator Programme entrant
- NG = Next Gen Accelerator Program entrant
- w/o = Walkover
- r = Retired
- d = Defaulted

=== Finals ===
Semifinals
(Uruguay) Franco Roncadelli	4	6	6
(Peru) Juan Pablo Varillas	6	2	2
(Italy) Gianluca Cadenasso	4	6	6
(Argentina) Lautaro Midón	6	1	0

Final
(Uruguay) Franco Roncadelli	6^{5}	0
(Italy) Gianluca Cadenasso	7^{7}	6

=== Top half ===
First round
1	(Paraguay) AD Vallejo	6	6
Q	(Argentina) Carlos María Zárate	2	2
(Uruguay) F Roncadelli	6	0
(Argentina) A Collarini	4	0^{r}
Q	(Argentina) V Aboian	6	6
Q	(Brazil) João Eduardo Schiessl	4	3
Q	(Brazil) PA Saraiva dos Santos	6^{5}	6	3
5	(Brazil) JL Reis da Silva	7^{7}	1	6
4	(Argentina) A Barrena	7	6
Alt	(United States) C Kingsley	5	3
(Bolivia) M Dellien	6	6
WC	(Paraguay) Santino Núñez	3	2
Alt	(Argentina) M Kestelboim	0	4
(Peru) JP Varillas	6	6
(Argentina) GI Justo	3	4
7	(Bolivia) JC Prado Ángelo	6	6

Second round
1	(Paraguay) AD Vallejo	3	4
(Uruguay) F Roncadelli	6	6
Q	(Argentina) V Aboian	3	3
5	(Brazil) JL Reis da Silva	6	6
4	(Argentina) A Barrena	1	7^{7}	6
(Bolivia) M Dellien	6	6^{2}	1
(Peru) JP Varillas	6	4	6
7	(Bolivia) JC Prado Ángelo	3	6	3

Quarterfinals
(Uruguay) F Roncadelli	4	6	6
5	(Brazil) JL Reis da Silva	6	1	2
4	(Argentina) A Barrena	1	6^{6}
(Peru) JP Varillas	6	7^{8}

Semifinals
(Uruguay) F Roncadelli	4	6	6
(Peru) JP Varillas	6	2	2

=== Bottom half ===
First round
6	(Ecuador) Á Guillén Meza	3	3
(Italy) G Cadenasso	6	6
(Argentina) S Rodríguez Taverna	6	3	0^{r}
Alt	(Argentina) LE Ambrogi	3	6	3
(Brazil) P Boscardin Dias	7	6
WC	(Paraguay) Hernando José Escurra Isnardi	5	2
Q	(Peru) C Huertas del Pino	7	7
3	(Portugal) H Rocha	5	5
8	(Peru) G Bueno	6	7
WC	(Brazil) João Pedro Didoni Bonini	2	5
(Argentina) L Midón	7	6
(Argentina) G Villanueva	5	3
(Argentina) N Kicker	7	2	4
Q	(Argentina) Thiago Cigarrán	5	6	6
(Argentina) GA Olivieri	3	6	3
2	(Portugal) J Faria	6	2	6

Second round
(Italy) G Cadenasso	6	6
Alt	(Argentina) LE Ambrogi	1	4
(Brazil) P Boscardin Dias	6	6
Q	(Peru) C Huertas del Pino	2	2
8	(Peru) G Bueno	6	4	3
(Argentina) L Midón	4	6	6
Q	(Argentina) T Cigarrán	1	2
2	(Portugal) J Faria	6	6

Quarterfinals
(Italy) G Cadenasso	6	6
(Brazil) P Boscardin Dias	1	3
(Argentina) L Midón	7^{11}	3	6
2	(Portugal) J Faria	6^{9}	6	3

Semifinals
(Italy) G Cadenasso	4	6	6
(Argentina) L Midón	6	1	0
