= 2025 Paraguay Open – Singles =

Singles
- 2025 Paraguay Open

Final
- Champion: (United States) Emilio Nava
- Runner-up: (Brazil) Thiago Monteiro
- Score: 7–5, 6–3

Events
Singles	Doubles
- Paraguay Open

Gustavo Heide was the defending champion but chose not to defend his title.

Emilio Nava won the title after defeating Thiago Monteiro 7–5, 6–3 in the final.

== Seeds ==
1. (Brazil) Thiago Monteiro (final)
2. (Colombia) Daniel Elahi Galán (quarterfinals)
3. (Argentina) Román Andrés Burruchaga (quarterfinals)
4. (Chile) Tomás Barrios Vera (quarterfinals)
5. (Argentina) Facundo Mena (first round)
6. (Paraguay) Daniel Vallejo (semifinals)
7. (Peru) Juan Pablo Varillas (second round)
8. (Bolivia) Murkel Dellien (first round)

== Draw ==
Key

- Q = Qualifier
- WC = Wild card
- LL = Lucky loser
- Alt = Alternate
- ITF = ITF entry
- PR = Protected ranking
- SR = Special ranking
- SE = Special exempt
- JE = Junior exempt
- JR = Junior Accelerator Programme entrant
- CO = College Accelerator Programme entrant
- NG = Next Gen Accelerator Program entrant
- w/o = Walkover
- r = Retired
- d = Defaulted

=== Finals ===
Semifinals
1	(Brazil) Thiago Monteiro	7^{7}	7
(Brazil) Matheus Pucinelli de Almeida	6^{3}	5
(United States) Emilio Nava	6	6
6	(Paraguay) Daniel Vallejo	4	2

Final
1	(Brazil) Thiago Monteiro	5	3
(United States) Emilio Nava	7	6

=== Top half ===
First round
1	(Brazil) T Monteiro	6	0	6
(Switzerland) R Bertola	4	6	1
Q	(Argentina) M Kestelboim	6	6
Q	(Brazil) Gustavo Ribeiro de Almeida	2	2
(Brazil) JL Reis da Silva	6	6
WC	(Paraguay) Santino Núñez	3	3
(Ecuador) Á Guillén Meza	6	7
8	(Bolivia) M Dellien	2	5
3	(Argentina) RA Burruchaga	6	6
(Argentina) GA Olivieri	1	4
(Brazil) D Dutra da Silva	6	6
(Argentina) H Casanova	2	3
Q	(Peru) C Huertas del Pino	6^{3}	0
(Chile) M Soto	7^{7}	6
(Brazil) M Pucinelli de Almeida	7	6
5	(Argentina) F Mena	5	2

Second round
1	(Brazil) T Monteiro	6	5	6
Q	(Argentina) M Kestelboim	4	7	2
(Brazil) JL Reis da Silva	3	2
(Ecuador) Á Guillén Meza	6	6
3	(Argentina) RA Burruchaga	4	6	6
(Brazil) D Dutra da Silva	6	2	3
(Chile) M Soto	2	2
(Brazil) M Pucinelli de Almeida	6	6

Quarterfinals
1	(Brazil) T Monteiro	6	6
(Ecuador) Á Guillén Meza	4	4
3	(Argentina) RA Burruchaga	3	4
(Brazil) M Pucinelli de Almeida	6	6

Semifinals
1	(Brazil) T Monteiro	7^{7}	7
(Brazil) M Pucinelli de Almeida	6^{3}	5

=== Bottom half ===
First round
7	(Peru) JP Varillas	6	6
(Argentina) GI Justo	3	4
Q	(Argentina) Lorenzo Joaquín Rodríguez	4	2
(United States) Em Nava	6	6
WC	(Paraguay) Hernando José Escurra Isnardi	6^{6}	1
(Argentina) G Villanueva	7^{8}	6
Q	(United States) Felix Corwin	1	6^{3}
4	(Chile) T Barrios Vera	6	7^{7}
6	(Paraguay) AD Vallejo	6	7^{7}
(Argentina) S Rodríguez Taverna	3	6^{5}
(Uruguay) F Roncadelli	7	6
LL	(Brazil) Igor Gimenez	5	2
WC	(Brazil) P Boscardin Dias	6	3	6
(Argentina) JB Torres	3	6	4
Q	(Chile) Benjamín Torrealba	1	4
2	(Colombia) DE Galán	6	6

Second round
7	(Peru) JP Varillas	7^{7}	2	2
(United States) Em Nava	6^{4}	6	6
(Argentina) G Villanueva	7^{7}	4	3
4	(Chile) T Barrios Vera	6^{5}	6	6
6	(Paraguay) AD Vallejo	6	6
(Uruguay) F Roncadelli	2	3
WC	(Brazil) P Boscardin Dias	2	0
2	(Colombia) DE Galán	6	6

Quarterfinals
(United States) Em Nava	2	6	7
4	(Chile) T Barrios Vera	6	3	5
6	(Paraguay) AD Vallejo	6	6
2	(Colombia) DE Galán	2	2

Semifinals
(United States) Em Nava	6	6
6	(Paraguay) AD Vallejo	4	2
