= 2024 Montemar Challenger – Singles =

Singles
- 2024 Montemar Challenger

Final
- Champion: (Italy) Fabio Fognini
- Runner-up: (Austria) Lukas Neumayer
- Score: 6–3, 2–6, 6–3

Events
Singles	Doubles
- Montemar Challenger

This was the first edition of the tournament.

Fabio Fognini won the title after defeating Lukas Neumayer 6–3, 2–6, 6–3 in the final.

== Seeds ==
1. (Italy) Fabio Fognini (champion)
2. (India) Sumit Nagal (first round)
3. (Bosnia and Herzegovina) Damir Džumhur (second round)
4. (Italy) Francesco Passaro (first round)
5. (Argentina) Marco Trungelliti (first round, retired)
6. (Spain) Albert Ramos Viñolas (second round)
7. (Spain) Alejandro Moro Cañas (first round)
8. (Lithuania) Vilius Gaubas (first round)

== Draw ==
Key

- Q = Qualifier
- WC = Wild card
- LL = Lucky loser
- Alt = Alternate
- ITF = ITF entry
- PR = Protected ranking
- SR = Special ranking
- SE = Special exempt
- JE = Junior exempt
- JR = Junior Accelerator Programme entrant
- CO = College Accelerator Programme entrant
- NG = Next Gen Accelerator Program entrant
- w/o = Walkover
- r = Retired
- d = Defaulted

=== Finals ===
Semifinals
1/WC	(Italy) Fabio Fognini	6	6^{3}	6
Q	(Spain) Iñaki Montes de la Torre	4	7^{7}	0
WC	(Spain) Pol Martín Tiffon	3	7	2
(Austria) Lukas Neumayer	6	5	6

Final
1/WC	(Italy) Fabio Fognini	6	2	6
(Austria) Lukas Neumayer	3	6	3

=== Top half ===
First round
1/WC	(Italy) F Fognini	6	3	7^{7}
Alt	(Spain) D Rincón	2	6	6^{5}
(Spain) O Roca Batalla	4	2
Q	Svyatoslav Gulin	6	6
(Kazakhstan) D Yevseyev	4	6	7
Q	(South Korea) G Campaña Lee	6	4	5
(Bulgaria) I Radulov	7	4
5	(Argentina) M Trungelliti	5	2^{r}
4	(Italy) F Passaro	6^{4}	6	0
(Norway) N Budkov Kjær	7^{7}	4	6
(Spain) P Carreño Busta	6	6
Q	(Spain) M Alcalá Gurri	2	4
Q	(Spain) I Montes de la Torre	6	7
(Argentina) S Rodríguez Taverna	2	5
PR	(Belgium) K Coppejans	1	6	6
8	(Lithuania) V Gaubas	6	4	4

Second round
1/WC	(Italy) F Fognini	6	6
Q	S Gulin	3	2
(Kazakhstan) D Yevseyev	6	6
(Bulgaria) I Radulov	0	2
(Norway) N Budkov Kjær	6^{2}	6	6
(Spain) P Carreño Busta	7^{7}	4	4
Q	(Spain) I Montes de la Torre	2	6	6
PR	(Belgium) K Coppejans	6	4	3

Quarterfinals
1/WC	(Italy) F Fognini	6	6
(Kazakhstan) D Yevseyev	4	2
(Norway) N Budkov Kjær	2	2
Q	(Spain) I Montes de la Torre	6	6

Semifinals
1/WC	(Italy) F Fognini	6	6^{3}	6
Q	(Spain) I Montes de la Torre	4	7^{7}	0

=== Bottom half ===
First round
7	(Spain) A Moro Cañas	6	3	4
WC	(Spain) C Sánchez Jover	3	6	6
WC	(Spain) P Martín Tiffon	7^{7}	6
Q	(Spain) M Damas	6^{0}	1
(Italy) A Pellegrino	1^{r}
(Jordan) A Shelbayh	1
(Spain) J Barranco Cosano	7^{7}	4	3
3	(Bosnia and Herzegovina) D Džumhur	6^{4}	6	6
6	(Spain) A Ramos Viñolas	6	6
(Spain) C Taberner	3	3
(Austria) L Neumayer	7^{7}	6
Q	(Spain) Carlos López Montagud	6^{2}	4
(Dominican Republic) N Hardt	6	2
(Bulgaria) A Andreev	3	1^{r}
(Lithuania) E Butvilas	6	7
2	(India) S Nagal	3	5

Second round
WC	(Spain) C Sánchez Jover	4	3
WC	(Spain) P Martín Tiffon	6	6
(Jordan) A Shelbayh	6	6
3	(Bosnia and Herzegovina) D Džumhur	4	2
6	(Spain) A Ramos Viñolas	2	6^{2}
(Austria) L Neumayer	6	7^{7}
(Dominican Republic) N Hardt	7^{7}	6
(Lithuania) E Butvilas	6^{3}	1

Quarterfinals
WC	(Spain) P Martín Tiffon	6	7
(Jordan) A Shelbayh	3	5
(Austria) L Neumayer	6	7^{9}
(Dominican Republic) N Hardt	3	6^{7}

Semifinals
WC	(Spain) P Martín Tiffon	3	7	2
(Austria) L Neumayer	6	5	6
