= 2025 Montemar Challenger =

- Date: 17–23 November
- Edition: 2nd
- Surface: Clay
- Location: Alicante, Spain

Champions

Singles
- (Czech Republic) Zdeněk Kolář

Doubles
- (Sweden) Erik Grevelius / (Sweden) Adam Heinonen
- Montemar Challenger

The 2025 Montemar Challenger Ene Construcción was a professional tennis tournament played on clay courts. It was the second edition of the tournament which was part of the 2025 ATP Challenger Tour. It took place in Alicante, Spain between 17 and 23 November 2025.

== Singles main draw entrants ==
=== Seeds ===
Country	Player	Rank^{1}	Seed
ESP	Carlos Taberner	104	1
ARG	Marco Trungelliti	136	2
DEN	Elmer Møller	148	3
ESP	Daniel Mérida	172	4
FRA	Clément Tabur	198	5
ITA	Lorenzo Giustino	216	6
CZE	Zdeněk Kolář	224	7
FRA	Geoffrey Blancaneaux	254	8

- ^{1} Rankings as of 10 November 2025.

=== Other entrants ===
The following players received wildcards into the singles main draw:

- (Switzerland) Adrien Burdet
- (Spain) Alberto García García
- (Spain) Andrés Santamarta Roig

The following player received entry into the singles main draw using a protected ranking:

- (Bulgaria) Adrian Andreev

The following player received entry into the singles main draw as an alternate:

- (Bosnia and Herzegovina) Andrej Nedić

The following players received entry from the qualifying draw:

- (Spain) Max Alcalá Gurri
- (Italy) Gianluca Cadenasso
- (Romania) Cezar Crețu
- Svyatoslav Gulin
- (Italy) Filippo Moroni
- (Romania) Ștefan Paloși

The following player received entry as a lucky loser:

- (Italy) Federico Bondioli

== Champions ==
=== Singles ===
- (Czech Republic) Zdeněk Kolář def. (Italy) Gianluca Cadenasso 6–4, 6–4.

=== Doubles ===
- (Sweden) Erik Grevelius / (Sweden) Adam Heinonen def. (Italy) Federico Bondioli / (Italy) Gianluca Cadenasso 6–3, 6–3.
