= 2025 Paraguay Open – Doubles =

Doubles
- 2025 Paraguay Open

Final
- Champions: (United States) Vasil Kirkov (Chile) Matías Soto
- Runners-up: (Argentina) Guillermo Durán (Argentina) Mariano Kestelboim
- Score: 6–3, 6–4

Events
Singles	Doubles
- Paraguay Open

Boris Arias and Federico Zeballos were the defending champions but lost in the first round to Álvaro Guillén Meza and Guido Iván Justo.

Vasil Kirkov and Matías Soto won the title after defeating Guillermo Durán and Mariano Kestelboim 6–3, 6–4 in the final.

== Seeds ==
1. (Colombia) Cristian Rodríguez / (Brazil) Marcelo Zormann (quarterfinals)
2. (Bolivia) Boris Arias / (Bolivia) Federico Zeballos (first round)
3. (United States) Vasil Kirkov / (Chile) Matías Soto (champions)
4. (Japan) Seita Watanabe / (Japan) Takeru Yuzuki (first round)

== Draw ==
Key

- Q = Qualifier
- WC = Wild card
- LL = Lucky loser
- Alt = Alternate
- ITF = ITF entry
- PR = Protected ranking
- SR = Special ranking
- SE = Special exempt
- JE = Junior exempt
- JR = Junior Accelerator Programme entrant
- CO = College Accelerator Programme entrant
- NG = Next Gen Accelerator Program entrant
- w/o = Walkover
- r = Retired
- d = Defaulted

=== Draw ===
First round
1	(Colombia) C Rodríguez (Brazil) M Zormann	2	6	[10]
(Argentina) V Aboian (Uruguay) I Carou	6	3	[8]
(Peru) A Huertas del Pino (Peru) C Huertas del Pino	6	3	[10]
(Brazil) L Britto (Brazil) D Dutra da Silva	3	6	[7]
3	(United States) V Kirkov (Chile) M Soto	6	6
WC	(Paraguay) Alexander Báez (Paraguay) Santino Núñez	1	0
Alt	(Argentina) Ignacio Monzón (Argentina) Lorenzo Joaquín Rodríguez	7	6
WC	(Paraguay) Hernando José Escurra Isnardi (Paraguay) Martín Antonio Vergara del Puerto	5	3
(Brazil) M Pucinelli de Almeida (Brazil) PA Saraiva dos Santos	2	4
(Argentina) H Casanova (Argentina) S Rodríguez Taverna	6	6
(Argentina) G Durán (Argentina) M Kestelboim	6	7
4	(Japan) S Watanabe (Japan) T Yuzuki	4	5
(Switzerland) R Bertola (Brazil) Gabriel Roveri Sidney	2	6	[11]
(Brazil) P Boscardin Dias (Brazil) JL Reis da Silva	6	4	[9]
(Ecuador) Á Guillén Meza (Argentina) GI Justo	4	6	[10]
2	(Bolivia) B Arias (Bolivia) F Zeballos	6	4	[4]

Quarterfinals
1	(Colombia) C Rodríguez (Brazil) M Zormann	4	2
(Peru) A Huertas del Pino (Peru) C Huertas del Pino	6	6
3	(United States) V Kirkov (Chile) M Soto	6	6
Alt	(Argentina) I Monzón (Argentina) LJ Rodríguez	3	2
(Argentina) H Casanova (Argentina) S Rodríguez Taverna	3	5
(Argentina) G Durán (Argentina) M Kestelboim	6	7
(Switzerland) R Bertola (Brazil) G Roveri Sidney	6^{3}	6^{6}
(Ecuador) Á Guillén Meza (Argentina) GI Justo	7^{7}	7^{8}

Semifinals
(Peru) A Huertas del Pino (Peru) C Huertas del Pino	6^{6}	6	[6]
3	(United States) V Kirkov (Chile) M Soto	7^{8}	3	[10]
(Argentina) G Durán (Argentina) M Kestelboim	6	6
(Ecuador) Á Guillén Meza (Argentina) GI Justo	4	4

Final
3	(United States) V Kirkov (Chile) M Soto	6	6
(Argentina) G Durán (Argentina) M Kestelboim	3	4
