= 2026 Maia Challenger – Doubles =

Doubles
- 2026 Maia Challenger

Final
- Champions: (Slovakia) Miloš Karol (Czech Republic) Andrew Paulson
- Runners-up: (Portugal) Tiago Pereira (Spain) Benjamín Winter López
- Score: 4–6, 6–1, [11–9]

Events
Singles	Doubles
- Maia Challenger

Alexander Donski and Tiago Pereira were the defending champions but only Pereira chose to defend his title, partnering Benjamín Winter López. They lost in the final to Miloš Karol and Andrew Paulson.

Karol and Paulson won the title after defeating Pereira and Winter López 4–6, 6–1, [11–9] in the final.

== Seeds ==
1. (Mexico) Miguel Ángel Reyes-Varela / (United States) Reese Stalder (first round)
2. (Colombia) Nicolás Barrientos / (United States) Mac Kiger (first round)
3. (Croatia) Admir Kalender / (Croatia) Nino Serdarušić (first round)
4. (Slovakia) Miloš Karol / (Czech Republic) Andrew Paulson (champions)

== Draw ==
Key

- Q = Qualifier
- WC = Wild card
- LL = Lucky loser
- Alt = Alternate
- ITF = ITF entry
- PR = Protected ranking
- SR = Special ranking
- SE = Special exempt
- JE = Junior exempt
- JR = Junior Accelerator Programme entrant
- CO = College Accelerator Programme entrant
- NG = Next Gen Accelerator Program entrant
- w/o = Walkover
- r = Retired
- d = Defaulted

First round
1	(Mexico) M Reyes-Varela (United States) R Stalder	1	4
(Sweden) A Heinonen (Czech Republic) M Vrbenský	6	6
(United States) T Hilderbrand (Romania) B Pavel	6^{3}	6	[8]
(Spain) S Martos Gornés (Poland) S Walków	7^{7}	4	[10]
3	(Croatia) A Kalender (Croatia) N Serdarušić	3	1
(Portugal) T Pereira (Spain) B Winter López	6	6
(Italy) R Brancaccio (Spain) P Martínez	6	2	[13]
WC	(Portugal) J Domingues (Portugal) T Torres	3	6	[11]
(Poland) K Drzewiecki (Poland) P Matuszewski	6	3	[10]
WC	(Portugal) Francisco Rocha (Portugal) H Rocha	2	6	[4]
(Spain) Í Cervantes (Ukraine) D Molchanov	4	2
4	(Slovakia) M Karol (Czech Republic) A Paulson	6	6
(India) S Nagal (Hungary) Z Piros	2	1
(Spain) M Alcalá Gurri (Spain) N Sánchez Izquierdo	6	6
(Romania) A Jecan (Poland) S Kielan	6	7^{7}
2	(Colombia) N Barrientos (United States) M Kiger	4	6^{4}

Quarterfinals
(Sweden) A Heinonen (Czech Republic) M Vrbenský	7^{7}	6
(Spain) S Martos Gornés (Poland) S Walków	6^{5}	4
(Portugal) T Pereira (Spain) B Winter López	w/o
(Italy) R Brancaccio (Spain) P Martínez
(Poland) K Drzewiecki (Poland) P Matuszewski	6^{4}	4
4	(Slovakia) M Karol (Czech Republic) A Paulson	7^{7}	6
(Spain) M Alcalá Gurri (Spain) N Sánchez Izquierdo	1	4
(Romania) A Jecan (Poland) S Kielan	6	6

Semifinals
(Sweden) A Heinonen (Czech Republic) M Vrbenský	3	4
(Portugal) T Pereira (Spain) B Winter López	6	6
4	(Slovakia) M Karol (Czech Republic) A Paulson	6	6^{8}	[10]
(Romania) A Jecan (Poland) S Kielan	3	7^{10}	[7]

Final
(Portugal) T Pereira (Spain) B Winter López	6	1	[9]
4	(Slovakia) M Karol (Czech Republic) A Paulson	4	6	[11]
