= 2026 Maia Challenger =

- Date: 12 – 18 October
- Edition: 9th
- Surface: Clay (indoor)
- Location: Maia, Portugal

Champions

Singles
- (Italy) Francesco Passaro

Doubles
- (Slovakia) Miloš Karol / (Czech Republic) Andrew Paulson
- Maia Challenger

The 2026 Maia Open was a professional tennis tournament played on indoor clay courts. It was the ninth edition of the tournament which was part of the 2026 ATP Challenger Tour. It took place in Maia, Portugal from 12 to 18 October 2026.

== Singles main-draw entrants ==
=== Seeds ===
Country	Player	Rank^{1}	Seed
ARG	Marco Trungelliti	90	1
POR	Henrique Rocha	106	2
HUN	Zsombor Piros	114	3
ESP	Pedro Martínez	130	4
ESP	Max Alcalá Gurri	138	5
LTU	Vilius Gaubas	141	6
ITA	Andrea Pellegrino	145	7
ESP	Nikolás Sánchez Izquierdo	157	8

- ^{1} Rankings are as of 5 October 2026.

=== Other entrants ===
The following players received wildcards into the singles main draw:

- (Portugal) Tiago Pereira
- (Portugal) Francisco Rocha
- (Portugal) Tiago Torres

The following player received entry into the singles main draw as an alternate:

- (Italy) Filippo Romano

The following players received entry from the qualifying draw:

- (Germany) Florian Broska
- (Lebanon) Benjamin Hassan
- (Slovakia) Miloš Karol
- (Slovakia) Andrej Martin
- (Spain) Alejo Sánchez Quílez
- (Czech Republic) Michael Vrbenský

== Champions ==
=== Singles ===
- (Italy) Francesco Passaro def. (Hungary) Zsombor Piros 4–6, 6–3, 6–2.

=== Doubles ===
- (Slovakia) Miloš Karol / (Czech Republic) Andrew Paulson def. (Portugal) Tiago Pereira / (Spain) Benjamín Winter López 4–6, 6–1, [11–9].
