= 2026 Montemar Challenger =

- Date: 23–29 March
- Edition: 3rd
- Surface: Clay
- Location: Alicante, Spain

Champions

Singles
- (Spain) Pablo Llamas Ruiz

Doubles
- (Poland) Szymon Kielan / (Portugal) Tiago Pereira
- Montemar Challenger

The 2026 Montemar Ene Construcción was a professional tennis tournament played on clay courts. It was the third edition of the tournament which was part of the 2026 ATP Challenger Tour. It took place in Alicante, Spain between 23 and 29 March 2026.

== Singles main draw entrants ==
=== Seeds ===
Country	Player	Rank^{1}	Seed
AUT	Sebastian Ofner	86	1
NED	Jesper de Jong	91	2
LTU	Vilius Gaubas	105	3
ESP	Pedro Martínez	113	4
ESP	Pablo Carreño Busta	117	5
~~DEN~~	~~Elmer Møller~~	~~122~~	~~6~~
GBR	Jan Choinski	123	7
SRB	Dušan Lajović	127	8

- ^{1} Rankings as of 16 March 2026.

=== Other entrants ===
The following players received wildcards into the singles main draw:

- (Serbia) Dušan Lajović
- (Spain) Iñaki Montes de la Torre
- (Spain) Carlos Sánchez Jover

The following players received entry from the qualifying draw:

- (United States) Dali Blanch
- Svyatoslav Gulin
- Ilya Ivashka
- (Portugal) Tiago Pereira
- (Italy) Samuele Pieri
- (Spain) Alejo Sánchez Quílez

The following players received entry as lucky losers:

- (Lebanon) Benjamin Hassan
- (Jordan) Abdullah Shelbayh

== Champions ==
=== Singles ===
- (Spain) Pablo Llamas Ruiz def. (Spain) Pablo Carreño Busta 6–4, 6–2.

=== Doubles ===
- (Poland) Szymon Kielan / (Portugal) Tiago Pereira def. (Colombia) Nicolás Barrientos / (Uruguay) Ariel Behar 4–6, 6–3, [15–13].
