= 2024 Montemar Challenger =

- Date: 18–24 November
- Edition: 1st
- Surface: Clay
- Location: Alicante, Spain

Champions

Singles
- (Italy) Fabio Fognini

Doubles
- (Poland) Karol Drzewiecki / (Poland) Piotr Matuszewski
- Montemar Challenger

The 2024 Montemar Challenger Ene Construcción was a professional tennis tournament played on clay courts. It was the first edition of the tournament which was part of the 2024 ATP Challenger Tour. It took place in Alicante, Spain between 18 and 24 November 2024.

== Singles main draw entrants ==
=== Seeds ===
Country	Player	Rank^{1}	Seed
ITA	Fabio Fognini	83	1
IND	Sumit Nagal	93	2
BIH	Damir Džumhur	106	3
ITA	Francesco Passaro	115	4
ARG	Marco Trungelliti	140	5
ESP	Albert Ramos Viñolas	150	6
ESP	Alejandro Moro Cañas	163	7
LTU	Vilius Gaubas	187	8

- ^{1} Rankings as of 11 November 2024.

=== Other entrants ===
The following players received wildcards into the singles main draw:

- (Italy) Fabio Fognini
- (Spain) Pol Martín Tiffon
- (Spain) Carlos Sánchez Jover

The following player received entry into the singles main draw using a protected ranking:

- (Belgium) Kimmer Coppejans

The following player received entry into the singles main draw as an alternate:

- (Spain) Daniel Rincón

The following players received entry from the qualifying draw:

- (Spain) Max Alcalá Gurri
- (South Korea) Gerard Campaña Lee
- (Spain) Miguel Damas
- Svyatoslav Gulin
- (Spain) Carlos López Montagud
- (Spain) Iñaki Montes de la Torre

== Champions ==
=== Singles ===
- (Italy) Fabio Fognini def. (Austria) Lukas Neumayer 6–3, 2–6, 6–3.

=== Doubles ===
- (Poland) Karol Drzewiecki / (Poland) Piotr Matuszewski def. (Spain) Daniel Rincón / (Jordan) Abdullah Shelbayh 6–3, 6–4.
