= 2024 Paraguay Open =

- Date: 18–24 March
- Edition: 1st
- Surface: Clay
- Location: Asunción, Paraguay

Champions

Singles
- (Brazil) Gustavo Heide

Doubles
- (Bolivia) Boris Arias / (Bolivia) Federico Zeballos
- Paraguay Open

The 2024 Paraguay Open, known as Paraguay Open Dove Men+Care, was a professional tennis tournament played on clay courts. It was the first edition of the tournament which was part of the 2024 ATP Challenger Tour. It took place in Asunción, Paraguay between 18 and 24 March 2024.

== Singles main draw entrants ==
=== Seeds ===
Country	Player	Rank^{1}	Seed
PER	Juan Pablo Varillas	110	1
ARG	Román Andrés Burruchaga	159	2
BOL	Hugo Dellien	161	3
ARG	Genaro Alberto Olivieri	177	4
POR	Gonçalo Oliveira	217	5
FRA	Geoffrey Blancaneaux	223	6
FRA	Enzo Couacaud	231	7
BRA	Gustavo Heide	240	8

- ^{1} Rankings are as of 4 March 2024.

=== Other entrants ===
The following players received wildcards into the singles main draw:

- (Paraguay) Hernando José Escurra Isnardi
- (Bolivia) Juan Carlos Prado Ángelo
- (Paraguay) Daniel Vallejo

The following players received entry from the qualifying draw:

- (Argentina) Valerio Aboian
- (Israel) Daniel Cukierman
- (Argentina) Lorenzo Joaquín Rodríguez
- (Argentina) Juan Bautista Torres
- (Argentina) Gonzalo Villanueva
- (Brazil) Nicolas Zanellato

== Champions ==
=== Singles ===
- (Brazil) Gustavo Heide def. (Brazil) João Fonseca 7–5, 6–7^{(6–8)}, 6–1.

=== Doubles ===
- (Bolivia) Boris Arias / (Bolivia) Federico Zeballos def. (Peru) Gonzalo Bueno / (Ecuador) Álvaro Guillén Meza 6–2, 6–2.
