= Trofeo Città di San Gregorio =

- 2026 Trofeo Città di San Gregorio

ATP Challenger Tour
- Event name: Trofeo TS (Tennis School) Monte Kà Tira - Città di San Gregorio
- Location: San Gregorio di Catania, Italy
- Category: ATP Challenger Tour
- Surface: Clay

The Trofeo TS Monte Kà Tira - Città di San Gregorio is a professional tennis tournament played on clay courts. It is currently part of the ATP Challenger Tour. It is held in San Gregorio di Catania, Italy.

== Past finals ==
=== Singles ===
Year	Champion	Runner-up	Score
2026	(Italy) Gianluca Cadenasso	(Romania) Radu Mihai Papoe	6–4, 3–6, 6–4

=== Doubles ===
Year	Champions	Runners-up	Score
2026	(Ukraine) Oleksandr Ovcharenko (Germany) Kai Wehnelt	(Spain) Ignasi Forcano (Morocco) Younes Lalami	6–4, 6–2
