= 2026 Paraguay Open =

- Date: 16–22 March
- Edition: 3rd
- Surface: Clay
- Location: Asunción, Paraguay

Champions

Singles
- (Italy) Gianluca Cadenasso

Doubles
- (Argentina) Mariano Kestelboim / (Brazil) Marcelo Zormann
- Paraguay Open

The 2026 Munich Ultra Paraguay Open was a professional tennis tournament played on clay courts. It was the third edition of the tournament which was part of the 2026 ATP Challenger Tour. It took place in Asunción, Paraguay between 16 and 22 March 2026.

== Singles main draw entrants ==
=== Seeds ===
Country	Player	Rank^{1}	Seed
PAR	Daniel Vallejo	104	1
POR	Jaime Faria	163	2
POR	Henrique Rocha	169	3
ARG	Alex Barrena	179	4
BRA	João Lucas Reis da Silva	205	5
ECU	Álvaro Guillén Meza	207	6
BOL	Juan Carlos Prado Ángelo	210	7
PER	Gonzalo Bueno	213	8

- ^{1} Rankings are as of 2 March 2026.

=== Other entrants ===
The following players received wildcards into the singles main draw:

- (Brazil) João Pedro Didoni Bonini
- (Paraguay) Hernando José Escurra Isnardi
- (Paraguay) Santino Núñez

The following players received entry into the singles main draw as alternates:

- (Argentina) Luciano Emanuel Ambrogi
- (Argentina) Mariano Kestelboim
- (United States) Cannon Kingsley

The following players received entry from the qualifying draw:

- (Argentina) Valerio Aboian
- (Argentina) Thiago Cigarrán
- (Peru) Conner Huertas del Pino
- (Brazil) Paulo André Saraiva dos Santos
- (Brazil) João Eduardo Schiessl
- (Argentina) Carlos María Zárate

== Champions ==
=== Singles ===
- (Italy) Gianluca Cadenasso def. (Uruguay) Franco Roncadelli 7–6^{(7–5)}, 6–0.

=== Doubles ===
- (Argentina) Mariano Kestelboim / (Brazil) Marcelo Zormann def. (United States) Mac Kiger / (United States) Reese Stalder 6–4, 7–5.
