= Gianluca Cadenasso =

Italian tennis player (born 2004)

- Country (sports): Italy
- Born: 29 September 2004 (age 22) Genoa, Italy
- Height: 1.75 m (5 ft 9 in)
- Plays: Right-handed (two-handed backhand)
- Coach: Francesco Picco, Mauro Balestra
- Prize money: US $249,878

Singles
- Career record: 0–1 (at ATP Tour level, Grand Slam level, and in Davis Cup)
- Career titles: 1 Challenger, 4 ITF
- Highest ranking: No. 183 (19 October 2026)
- Current ranking: No. 183 (19 October 2026)

Grand Slam singles results
- French Open: Q2 (2026)
- Wimbledon: Q1 (2026)

Doubles
- Career record: 0–1 (at ATP Tour level, Grand Slam level, and in Davis Cup)
- Career titles: 2 Challenger, 10 ITF
- Highest ranking: No. 181 (30 March 2026)
- Current ranking: No. 296 (19 October 2026)
- Last updated on: 19 October 2026.

Gianluca Cadenasso (born 29 September 2004) is an Italian tennis player. Cadenasso has a career high ATP singles ranking of world No. 183 achieved on 19 October 2026 and a doubles ranking of No. 181 achieved on 30 March 2026.

== Career ==
Cadenasso won his first ATP Challenger Tour main draw match at the 2025 AON Open Challenger, defeating Nicolai Budkov Kjær in the first round. He reached the final of the doubles at the same tournament, losing to Mick Veldheer and Szymon Walków with partner Lorenzo Carboni. He reached another doubles final at the 2025 Città di Biella, where he won his first Challenger title, partnering Filippo Romano.

In 2025, Cadenasso reached his first ATP Challenger Tour singles final in Alicante, Spain. He won his first ATP Challenger singles title at the 2026 Paraguay Open, defeating Franco Roncadelli in the final.

== ATP Challenger and ITF Tour finals ==
=== Singles: 11 (6 titles, 5 runner-ups) ===
Legend ATP Challenger (2–1) ITF WTT (4–4)	Finals by surface Hard (0–0) Clay (6–5)

Result	W–L	Date	Tournament	Tier	Surface	Opponent	Score
Loss	0–1	Nov 2025	Montemar Ene Construcción, Spain	Challenger	Clay	(Czech Republic) Zdeněk Kolář	4–6, 4–6
Win	1–1	Mar 2026	Paraguay Open, Paraguay	Challenger	Clay	(Uruguay) Franco Roncadelli	7–6^{(7–5)}, 6–0
Win	2–1	Oct 2026	Trofeo Città di San Gregorio, Italy	Challenger	Clay	(Romania) Radu Mihai Papoe	6–4, 3–6, 6–4
Loss	0–1	Jun 2024	M15 Bergamo, Italy	WTT	Clay	(Slovakia) Andrej Martin	3–6, 3–6
Win	1–1	Jul 2024	M15 Štore, Slovenia	WTT	Clay	(Italy) Lorenzo Carboni	3–6, 7–5, 6–3
Loss	1–2	Jun 2024	M15 Perugia, Italy	WTT	Clay	(Italy) Facundo Juarez	4–6, 4–6
Loss	1–3	Sep 2024	M25 Santa Margherita di Pula, Italy	WTT	Clay	(Ukraine) Oleksandr Ovcharenko	5–7, 2–6
Win	2–3	Nov 2024	M15 San Gregorio di Catania, Italy	WTT	Clay	(Italy) Gabriele Piraino	6–4, 7–5
Loss	2–4	Jun 2025	M15 Štore, Slovenia	WTT	Clay	(Slovenia) Bor Artnak	3–6, 1–6
Win	3–4	Oct 2025	M25 Santa Margherita di Pula, Italy	WTT	Clay	(Czech Republic) Martin Krumich	6–1, 6–1
Win	4–4	Oct 2025	M25 Santa Margherita di Pula, Italy	WTT	Clay	(Italy) Filippo Moroni	5–5 ret.

=== Doubles: 18 (12 titles, 6 runner-ups) ===
Legend ATP Challenger (2–2) ITF Futures (10–4)	Finals by surface Hard (2–0) Clay (10–6)

Result	W–L	Date	Tournament	Tier	Surface	Partner	Opponents	Score
Loss	0–1	Sep 2025	Genoa Open, Italy	Challenger	Clay	(Italy) Lorenzo Carboni	(Netherlands) Mick Veldheer (Poland) Szymon Walków	6–3, 4–6, [7–10]
Win	1–1	Sep 2025	Biella Challenger, Italy	Challenger	Clay	(Italy) Filippo Romano	(Belgium) Buvaysar Gadamauri (Netherlands) Jelle Sels	6–3, 7–5
Loss	1–2	Nov 2025	Montemar Ene Construcción, Spain	Challenger	Clay	(Italy) Federico Bondioli	(Sweden) Erik Grevelius (Sweden) Adam Heinonen	3–6, 3–6
Win	2–2	Mar 2026	Santiago Challenger, Chile	Challenger	Clay	(Brazil) Paulo André Saraiva dos Santos	(Mexico) Miguel Ángel Reyes-Varela (Bolivia) Federico Zeballos	6–3, 7–5
Loss	0–1	Jan 2024	M15 Kish Island, Iran	WTT	Clay	(Italy) Simone Agostini	(Iran) Samyar Elyasi (Iran) Ali Yazdani	6–7^{(6–8)}, 4–6
Win	1–1	Feb 2024	M25 Hammamet, Tunisia	WTT	Clay	(Italy) Simone Agostini	(Italy) Omar Brigida (Ukraine) Oleksandr Ovcharenko	6–2, 1–6, [10–7]
Loss	1–2	Mar 2024	M15 Alaminos, Cyprus	WTT	Clay	(Italy) Simone Agostini	(Greece) Christos Antonopoulos (Cyprus) Eleftherios Neos	4–6, 6–1, [5–10]
Win	2–2	May 2024	M15 Cervia, Italy	WTT	Clay	(Italy) Jacopo Bilardo	(Italy) Federico Bondioli (Japan) Rei Sakamoto	Walkover
Win	3–2	Jul 2024	M15 Štore, Slovenia	WTT	Clay	(Italy) Jacopo Bilardo	(Slovenia) Sebastian Dominko (Austria) Jan Kobierski	6–4, 7–6^{(7–5)}
Win	4–2	Jul 2024	M25 Padova, Italy	WTT	Clay	(Italy) Noah Perfetti	(Italy) Luca Giacomini (Italy) Giovanni Oradini	6–3, 6–4
Win	5–2	Jul 2024	M15 Perugia, Italy	WTT	Clay	(Italy) Jacopo Bilardo	(Italy) Lorenzo Lorusso (Italy) Felipe Virgili	6–3, 6–1
Win	6–2	Aug 2024	M25 Montesilvano, Italy	WTT	Clay	(Italy) Simone Agostini	(Italy) Lorenzo Rottoli (Italy) Mariano Tammaro	7–6^{(7–1)}, 6–2
Win	7–2	Aug 2024	M25 Santa Margherita di Pula, Italy	WTT	Clay	(Italy) Simone Agostini	(Italy) Giorgio Ricca (Italy) Augusto Virgili	3–6, 6–3, [10–3]
Win	8–2	Aug 2024	M15 Monastir, Tunisia	WTT	Hard	(Italy) Pietro Marino	(France) Charles Bertimon (France) Maxence Bertimon	5–7, 6–4, [10–8]
Win	9–2	Jan 2025	M15 Monastir, Tunisia	WTT	Hard	(Italy) Luca Potenza	(Ukraine) Vladyslav Orlov (Tunisia) Aziz Ouakaa	7–5, 6–1
Loss	9–3	Jun 2025	M15 Štore, Slovenia	WTT	Clay	(Italy) Alessio De Bernardis	(Luxembourg) Alex Knaff (Brazil) Igor Marcondes	1–6, 4–6
Loss	9–4	Jul 2025	M25 Pitești, Romania	WTT	Clay	(Italy) Niccolo Catini	(Uruguay) Franco Roncadelli (Moldova) Ilya Snițari	4–6, 4–6
Win	10–4	Aug 2025	M25 Lesa, Italy	WTT	Clay	(Ukraine) Oleksandr Ovcharenko	(Italy) Francesco Forti (Italy) Giovanni Oradini	6–7^{(6–8)}, 6–3, [10–5]
