= ATP Challenger Tour =

International men's tennis tournaments

The ATP Challenger Tour (known until the end of 2008 as the ATP Challenger Series) is a series of international men's professional tennis tournaments. It was founded in 1976 as a replacement for the ILTF Satellite Circuit (founded in 1971) as the second tier of tennis. The Challenger Tour events are the second-highest tier of tennis competition, behind the ATP Tour and ahead of the Men's World Tennis Tour tournaments. The ATP Challenger Tour is administered by the Association of Tennis Professionals (ATP). Players who succeed on the ATP Challenger Tour earn sufficient ranking points to enter the main or qualifying draws at ATP Tour tournaments. Players on the Challenger Tour are typically young players looking to advance their careers, those who fail to qualify for ATP events, or former ATP Tour players looking to return to the top tour.

== History of challenger events ==
The first challenger events were held in 1978, with eighteen events taking place. Two were held on the week beginning January 8, one in Auckland and another in Hobart. The next events were held one at a time beginning June 18 and ending August 18 in the following U.S. locations, in order: Shreveport, Birmingham, Asheville, Raleigh, Hilton Head, Virginia Beach, Wall, Cape Cod, and Lancaster. Events continued after a one-month hiatus with two that begun on September 24 and 25, one in Tinton Falls, New Jersey, and in Lincoln, Nebraska, respectively. The following week saw one event played, in Salt Lake City, then two played simultaneously in Tel Aviv and San Ramon, California, then one played the following week in Pasadena. A final event was played a month later in Kyoto. In comparison, the 2008 schedule saw 178 events played in more than 40 countries.

== Partnerships with ITA and World Tennis ==
In efforts to further the progression of college and junior players into the professional tour, the ATP Challenger Tour has partnered with the Intercollegiate Tennis Association (ITA) and World Tennis to give players more opportunities on the professional tour. Those that finish in the top 10 of the end-of-year college rankings are now eligible for six wild cards into the main draw of Challenger events, and if they have finished their college education, they receive 8 of those wild cards. Those that finish in the 11 through 20 range of the collegiate rankings are eligible for six qualifying wild cards, with those who have completed their college education being eligible for eight wild cards.

Much like the partnership with the ITA, the Challenger Tour also partnered with World Tennis. This partnership granted those with year-end rankings inside the top 10 in the world eligible for eight main draw Challenger Tour wildcards, and those who finished the year between 11 and 20 in the world receiving eight Challenger Tour qualifying wildcards.

== Prize money and ranking points ==
In 2022, during the most numerous season in the tour's history, the ATP Tour announced an overhaul of the tournaments system from 2023 season. Challenger 110 and Challenger 90 events were scrapped, Challenger 80 reduced to the Challenger 75 while the prize money requirements for it and Challenger 100 were increased. It also introduced the new highest category − Challenger 175 to be inaugurally held in the second week of Indian Wells, Rome and Madrid ATP Tour Masters 1000 events.

The points system as of 2025 is as follows:

Tournament category	Singles										Doubles				
Tournament category	W	F	SF	QF	R16	R32	R48	Q	Q2	Q1	W	F	SF	QF	R16
Challenger 175	175	90	50	25	13	0	0	6	3	0	175	100	60	32	0
Challenger 125	125	64	35	16	8	0	0	5	3	0	125	75	45	25	0
Challenger 100	100	50	25	14	7	0	0	4	2	0	100	60	36	20	0
Challenger 75	75	44	22	12	6	0	0	4	2	0	75	50	30	16	0
Challenger 50	50	25	14	8	4	0	0	3	1	0	50	30	17	9	0

== Player quality ==
Players have usually had success at the Futures tournaments of the Men's World Tennis Tour before competing in Challengers. Due to the lower level of points and money available at the Challenger level, most players in a Challenger have a world ranking of 100 to 500 for a $35K tournament and 50 to 250 for a $150K tournament. An exception happens during the second week of a Grand Slam tournament, when top-100 players who have already lost in the Slam try to take a wild card entry into a Challenger tournament beginning that second week.

== Tretorn Serie+ ==
In February 2007, Tretorn became the official ball of the Challenger Series, and the sponsor of a new series consisting of those Challenger tournaments with prize money of $100,000 or more. They renewed the sponsorship with the ATP in 2010 and extended it until the end of 2011.

== Records ==
=== Most singles titles ===
Position	Player	Title
1	(Chinese Taipei) Lu Yen-hsun	29
2	(Israel) Dudi Sela	23
3	(Italy) Paolo Lorenzi	21
4	(Argentina) Carlos Berlocq	19
5	(Japan) Go Soeda	18
5	(Australia) James Duckworth	18
7	(Argentina) Maximo Gonzalez	17
7	(Slovenia) Blaz Kavcic	17
7	(Argentina) Facundo Bagnis	17
7	(Bolivia) Hugo Dellien	17
10	(Japan) Takao Suzuki	16
10	(Slovenia) Aljaz Bedene	16
10	(Kazakhstan) Mikhail Kukushkin	16

=== Most matches won ===
Updated as of 1 November 2026

#	Matches won	Years
423	(Spain) Rubén Ramírez Hidalgo	2000–2017
421	(Italy) Paolo Lorenzi	2003–2021
409	(Japan) Go Soeda	2004–2022
372	(Argentina) Facundo Bagnis	2009–2025
369	(Chinese Taipei) Lu Yen-hsun	2002–2018
350	(Argentina) Carlos Berlocq	2002–2019
328	(Italy) Filippo Volandri	1999–2016
325	(Slovenia) Blaž Kavčič	2007–2022
323	(Brazil) Rogério Dutra Silva	2006–2019
321	(Israel) Dudi Sela	2003–2022
310	(Slovakia) Andrej Martin	2008–Present
306	(Argentina) Horacio Zeballos	2006–2017
304	(Portugal) Gastão Elias	2008–2026
minimum 300 wins

=== Oldest champions ===
Player	Age	Title
(Croatia) Ivo Karlović	39 years, 7 months	Calgary 2018
(Spain) Fernando Verdasco	38 years, 3 months	Monterrey 2022
(France) Richard Gasquet	38 years, 2 months	Cassis 2024
(Belgium) Dick Norman	38 years, 1 month	Mexico City 2009
(France) Stéphane Robert	37 years, 8 months	Burnie 2018
(Italy) Fabio Fognini	37 years, 6 months	Montemar 2024
(Australia) Bob Carmichael	37 years, 6 months	Hobart 1978
(France) Stéphane Robert	37 years, 5 months	Kobe 2017
(Spain) Tommy Robredo	37 years, 1 month	Parma 2019
(Spain) Tommy Robredo	37 years, 1 month	Poznań 2019
(Croatia) Marin Čilić	36 years, 8 months	Nottingham 2025

=== Youngest champions ===
Player	Age	Title
(United States) Michael Chang	15 years, 7 months	Las Vegas 1987
(France) Richard Gasquet	16 years	Montauban 2002
(Australia) Bernard Tomic	16 years, 4 months	Melbourne 2009
(Sweden) Kent Carlsson	16 years, 7 months	New Ulm 1984
(South Africa) Marcos Ondruska	16 years, 7 months	Durban 1989
(France) Richard Gasquet	16 years, 8 months	Sarajevo 2003
(Spain) Rafael Nadal	16 years, 9 months	Barletta 2003
(France) Richard Gasquet	16 years, 10 months	Napoli 2003
(Canada) Félix Auger-Aliassime	16 years, 10 months	Lyon 2017

=== Youngest to win multiple titles ===
Player	Age	Title
(France) Richard Gasquet	16 years, 8 months	Sarajevo 2003
(Canada) Félix Auger-Aliassime	17 years, 1 month	Sevilla 2017
(Spain) Rafael Nadal	17 years, 1 month	Segovia 2003
(Australia) Bernard Tomic	17 years, 3 months	Burnie 2010
(Spain) Carlos Alcaraz	17 years, 5 months	Barcelona 2020
(Serbia) Novak Djokovic	17 years, 5 months	Aachen 2004
(Argentina) Juan Martin del Potro	17 years, 6 months	Aguascalientes 2006

=== Youngest to win three titles ===
Player	Age	Title
(France) Richard Gasquet	16 years, 10 months	Napoli 2003
(Spain) Carlos Alcaraz	17 years, 5 months	Alicante 2020
(Canada) Félix Auger-Aliassime	17 years, 10 months	Lyon 2018
(Argentina) Juan Martin del Potro	17 years, 10 months	Segovia 2006
(Serbia) Novak Djokovic	17 years, 11 months	San Remo 2005

== List of events ==
The Tampere Open is the longest running ATP Challenger event.

=== Challenger 175 ($175,000+H / €151,629+H) ===
- Arizona Tennis Classic
- BNP Paribas Primrose Bordeaux
- Copa Cap Cana
- Copa Faulconbridge (2026-)
- Estoril Open (2025)
- Open Aix Provence Credit Agricole
- Piemonte Open Intesa Sanpaolo (2023–2025)
- Sardegna Open (2023–2024, 2026-)

=== Challenger 125 ($200,000+H / €181,250+H) ===
- AON Open Challenger
- Bahrain Ministry of Interior Tennis Challenger (2023-)
- Belgrade Challenger (2021)
- Bengaluru Open
- Biella Indoor II (2021)
- Brawo Open (2022-)
- Busan Open
- Canberra International (Workday) (2024-)
- Cancún Country Open (2025-)
- Copa Faulconbridge (2024-2025)
- Cranbrook Tennis Classic (2026-)
- Dialectic Zug Open
- Emilia-Romagna Tennis Cup
- Hangzhou Challenger (2024)
- Hall of Fame Open (2025-)
- HPP Open
- Internazionali di Tennis Città di Perugia
- Jinan Open (2017–2019, 2025–)
- Invest in Szczecin Open
- Kunming Open (2017–2019)
- Layjet Open (2023-2025)
- Lexus Birmingham Open
- Lexus Ilkley Open
- Lexus Nottingham Open
- Copa Sevilla
- Marbella Tennis Open (2022)
- Mexico City Open
- Morelia Open
- Monterrey Abierto GNP Seguros (2018–2019, 2023)
- Monza Open (2026-)
- Napoli Tennis Cup
- Ningbo (Yinzhou) International Men's Tennis Challenger (2015-2019)
- Olbia Challenger
- Open de Oeiras I
- Open Quimper Bretagne
- Open Metz-Grand Est
- Co'met Orléans Open
- Play In Challenger
- Eupago Porto Open (2023–2024, 2026-)
- Québec Challenger
- RD Open (2017-2019, 2022-2024)
- Rosario Challenger
- Costa do Sauípe Open (2025-)
- Saint-Tropez Open
- Salzburg Open (2021-2024)
- San Marino Tennis Open (2001–2014, 2021–)
- Serve First Open (2025-)
- Seoul Open (2023, 2026-)
- Slovak Open (2023-2025)
- Teréga Open Pau–Pyrénées
- Taipei OEC Open (2024)
- Tiburon Challenger (2026-)
- Trofeo Faip–Perrel (2027-)
- Vancouver Open (2022, 2026-)

=== Challenger 100 ($160,000+H / €145,250+H) ===
- Aberto da República (2023)
- BNC Tennis Open Nouvelle-Calédonie (2023-2025)
- Bratislava Open
- Brasil Tennis Challenger (2025)
- Campeonato Internacional de Tênis (2023-2024)
- Canberra International (2023)
- Cary Tennis Classic (2024)
- Challenger de Villa María (2024)
- Challenger Dove Men+Care Antofagasta (2023-2024)
- Challenger Dove Men+Care Concepcion (2026-)
- Challenger Dove Men+Care Temuco (2024-)
- Championnats Banque Nationale de Granby (2023)
- Chennai Open (2023-2025)
- Concord Iasi Open
- Copa Internacional de Tênis (2023-2024)
- Cranbrook Tennis Classic (2025)
- Danube Upper Austria Open powered by SKE
- Enea Poznań Open (2023, 2025-)
- Ferrero Challenger
- FlowBank Biel/Bienne Challenger (2021-2023)
- Guangzhou Huangpu International Tennis Open
- Internazionali di Tennis Città di Rovereto (2023-2024)
- Internazionali di Tennis Città di Trieste (2022-2025)
- Internazionali di Tennis Città di Verona (2023-2024)
- Jingshan Tennis Open (2025-)
- Koblenz Open powered by Outlet Montabaur (2023-2025)
- Kozerki Open (-2024)
- Latin America Open
- Lisboa Belém Open (2024-)
- Girona Challenger (2023-2025)
- Maia Open (2023-)
- MarketBeat Open (2025-)
- Slovak Open (2026-)
- Moldova Open (2026-)
- Montemar Challenger (2026-)
- Monza Open (2025)
- Neckarcup 2.0
- NÖ OPEN powered by EVN
- Oeiras Indoors I (2026-)
- Oeiras Indoors II and III (2025)
- Open de Oeiras II (2025-)
- Open Auvergne-Rhône-Alpes de Roanne
- Open Blot Rennes
- Open Brest-Credit Agricole
- Open Comunidad de Madrid
- Open de Vendée (-2024)
- Open Menorca
- Open Saint-Brieuc (2026-)
- Open Sopra Steria de Lyon
- Platzmann Open (-2024, 2026-)
- Eupago Porto Open (2025)
- PMRDA Maha Open - Pune Challenger (2023-2025)
- Rwanda Challenger II (2025-)
- San Diego Open
- Santaizi Challenger (2025-)
- Seoul Open (2024-2025)
- Shanghai Challenger - Road to the Rolex Masters
- Shenzhen Longhua Open (-2024)
- Tenerife Challenger
- Trofeo Faip–Perrel (2025)
- UniCredit Czech Open
- Uruguay Open (2023-)
- Vancouver Open (-2019)
- Vitas Gerulaitis Cup (2023)
- Wuxi Open
- Yokkaichi Challenger (2023)

=== Defunct tournaments ===
- Aberto de Brasília (2009–2010)
- Aberto de Florianópolis (-2012)
- Aberto da República (2021, 2023)
- Aberto Rio Grande do Sul (2012–2015)
- Aberto Rio Preto (2011, 2013)
- Aberto Santa Catarina de Tênis (2006-2012, 2022)
- Aberto de São Paulo (2001–2014)
- Abierto de Puebla (2016)
- Abierto Internacional Varonil Casablanca Cancún (2008-2010)
- Adriatic Challenger (2016)
- Aegon GB Pro-Series Bath (2011-2012)
- Aegon GB Pro-Series Glasgow (2015)
- Aegon GB Pro-Series Loughborough (2010-2012)
- Aegon Nottingham Challenge (2011-2014)
- Aegon Nothingham Trophy (2009-2014, 2021)
- Aegon Manchester Trophy (1995-2009, 2015-2016)
- Ağrı Challenger
- Aguascalientes Open (2011)
- Aguascalientes San Marcos Open (2022)
- Alessandria Challenger (-2011)
- Alexander Kolyaskin Memorial
- Almaty Challenger (2017–2019, 2021)
- Almaty Cup (2007–2009)
- Ambato La Gran Ciudad
- Antalya Challenger (2021, 2023)
- Astana Challenger Capital Cup (2016)
- Astana Cup (2010–2011)
- ATP Challenger Tour Finals
- ATP Challenger 2001 Team Padova
- ATP Challenger China International – Nanchang (2014–2016)
- ATP Challenger Torino (2015–2016)
- Banja Luka Open (-2023)
- (Chang-Sat) Bangkok Open
- (Chang-Sat) Bangkok 2 Open
- Bangkok Challenger II
- Bangkok Open IV
- Bangkok Open V
- Baotou International Challenger
- Båstad Challenger (2016-2018)
- Batman Cup
- Baton Rouge Pro Tennis Classic (2006-2010)
- Beijing International Challenger (2010-2013)
- Belo Horizonte Challenger (-2011)
- Bendigo International (2020, 2022)
- Bermuda Open (1993-2008)
- Biella Challenger Indoor (2021)
- Black Forest Open (-2009)
- BNP Paribas Sopot Open
- Brasil Tennis Challenger
- Brasília Open
- BRD Arad Challenger
- BRD Brașov Challenger
- BRD Timișoara Challenger
- Buenos Aires Challenger (-2001)
- Brazil Open Series (2010)
- BMW Ljubljana Open (-2011)
- BMW Tennis Championship (-2010)
- BW Open (2023–2024)
- Belgrade Challenger (2002-2007, 2008-2010, 2021)
- BSI Challenger Lugano (-2010)
- Calabasas Pro Tennis Championships (-2010)
- Campeonato Internacional de Tênis de Santos (2011-2016)
- Campeonato Internacional de Tênis do Estado do Pará (2012)
- Calgary National Bank Challenger
- Canberra Challenger (-2020)
- CDMX Open (2018)
- Challenger Britania Zavaleta
- Challenger de Salinas Diario Expreso (-2023)
- Challenger del Biobío (2022)
- Challenger di Roseto degli Abruzzi (2022-2023)
- Challenger Internazionale Dell'Insubria
- Challenger Iquique
- Città di Vercelli – Trofeo Multimed (2014-2015)
- Challenger Rio de Janeiro (2022)
- Charles Sturt Adelaide International (2013-2014)
- Chengdu Challenger (2016-2019)
- Città di Caltanissetta (-2018)
- Claro Open Cali
- Claro Open Medellín
- Concurso Internacional de Tenis – San Sebastián
- Concurso Internacional de Tenis – Vigo
- Copa Agco Córdoba (2012, 2014)
- Copa Ciudad de Tigre (2017)
- Copa Gobierno de Córdoba (2014)
- Copa Internacional de Tenis Total Digest (2013)
- Copa Petrobras Asunción
- Copa Petrobras Santiago
- Coquimbo Challenger Dove Men+Care (2022-2023)
- Corrientes Challenger
- Da Nang Tennis Open (2019)
- Dunlop World Challenge (2008-2017)
- East London Challenger (2008)
- Eddleman Pro Tennis Classic
- Eskişehir Cup
- Ethias Trophy (2005–2016)
- Fergana Challenger
- Firenze Tennis Cup
- Flea Market Cup
- FlowBank Biel/Bienne Challenger (2021-2023)
- Ford Tennis Championships
- Franken Challenge
- GHI Bronx Tennis Classic
- Gimcheon Open ATP Challenger
- Geneva Open Challenger (1992–2014)
- GNP Seguros Tennis Open (-2024)
- Gran Canaria Challenger – Ciudad de Telde (-2022)
- Green World Challenger - Pingguo (2011-2012)
- Grenoble Challenger (1999-2008)
- Guangzhou Nansha International Challenger (-2025)
- Guimarães Open (2013)
- Guzzini Challenger (-2019)
- The Hague Open (-2018)
- Hoff Open (2015–2016)
- Hangzhou Challenger (2024)
- Hua Hin Challenger (2015–2017)
- Marbella Open
- Ibagué Open (2024)
- IBG Prague Open (2021-2023)
- Indore Open ATP Challenger (2014)
- Internationaler Apano Cup
- International Challenger Quanzhou (2017)
- Internationaux de Tennis de Blois (2013-2024)
- International Tennis Tournament of Cortina (2014-2017)
- Internazionali di Forlì (2020-2021)
- Internazionali di Monza e Brianza (2005–2012)
- Internazionali di Tennis Città di Rovereto (2023-2024)
- Internazionali di Tennis Città di Verona (2021-2024)
- Internazionali di Tennis di Manerbio – Trofeo Dimmidisì (-2019)
- Internazionali di Tennis Castel del Monte (-2022)
- Internationaux du Doubs – Open de Franche-Comté
- Intersport Heilbronn Open (−2014)
- Irving Tennis Classic (2012-2018)
- IS Open de Tênis-São Paulo (2012-2013, 2015)
- IsarOpen (2018)
- Israel Open (2008–2016)
- Ixian Grand Aegean Tennis Cup (2009–2010)
- Jalisco Open (-2018)
- Jersey International Tennis (2008-2009)
- Jersey International (2008-2010)
- Jerusalem Volvo Open
- Kaohsiung OEC Open (2012-2019)
- Karshi Challenger (2007-2018)
- Kazan Kremlin Cup
- Kazan Open
- Kazan Summer Cup
- Købstædernes ATP Challenger (-2009)
- Kolkata Challenger (2014-2015)
- Kunal Patel San Francisco Open (KPSF Open)
- Kunming Challenger (2013)
- Kunming Open (2012-2019)
- Kyiv Open (1995-2005, 2021)
- Lambertz Open by STAWAG
- Layjet Open (2023-2025)
- Launceston Tennis International
- Lermontov Cup (2012)
- Levene Gouldin & Thompson Tennis Challenger (-2019)
- Liuzhou Open (2018-2019)
- LTP Men's Open (2023-2024)
- Lubbock Challenger (2005-2008)
- Ludwigshafen Challenger
- Maccabi Men's Challenger (2009)
- Málaga Open (2022-2023)
- Mamaia Challenger (2006-2009)
- Manila Challenger (2016)
- Marburg Open
- Manulife Singapore ATP Challenger (2011-2012)
- Marbella Tennis Open (2018-2022)
- Maspalomas Challenger (2022-2023)
- Meerbusch Challenger (2013-2023)
- Melbourne Open (2013)
- Memorial Argo Manfredini (2000-2008)
- Men's Pro Challenger at Tunica National (2005-2008)
- Mersin Cup
- Montauban Challenger (-2007)
- Monterrey Abierto GNP Seguros (2015-2023)
- Mordovia Cup
- Morocco Tennis Tour – Casablanca
- Morocco Tennis Tour – Casablanca II
- Morocco Tennis Tour – Kenitra
- Morocco Tennis Tour – Marrakech
- Morocco Tennis Tour – Meknes
- Morocco Tennis Tour – Mohammedia
- Morocco Tennis Tour – Rabat
- Morocco Tennis Tour – Tanger
- Music City Challenger (2004-2008)
- Napa Valley Challenger (2013-2014)
- Naples ITG Challenger (2007)
- Natomas Men's Professional Tennis Tournament (2005-2015)
- New Delhi Challenger (1999–2008)
- Nielsen Pro Tennis Championship (1984-2019)
- Nordic Naturals Challenger (-2019)
- Nur-Sultan Challenger (2019–2021)
- Oberstaufen Cup
- Open Città di Bari (2021)
- Open de Guadeloupe (2011-2018)
- Open de la Réunion (2014)
- Open Isla de Lanzarote
- Open Medellín (-2021)
- Open Rionegro (2023)
- Open Tarragona Costa Daurada
- Oporto Open
- Orbetello Challenger
- Oracle Challenger Series – Chicago (2018)
- Oracle Challenger Series – Houston (2018-2019)
- Oracle Challenger Series – Indian Wells (2018-2020)
- Oracle Challenger Series – New Haven (2019)
- Oracle Challenger Series – Newport Beach (2018-2020)
- Orlando Open
- Ostdeutscher Sparkassen Cup
- Palm Hills International Tennis Challenger (1983-2002, 2010)
- PEOPLEnet Cup
- Penza Cup (2006-2012)
- Peugeot Tennis Cup (2012-2013)
- Pingshan Open (2014-2019)
- Polish Open (tennis)
- Poprad-Tatry Challenger (2015-2018)
- Potchefstroom Open (2021)
- PTT İstanbul Cup
- Puerto Vallarta Open (2018-2024)
- Quito Challenger en Los Andes
- RC Hotel Open
- Recife - Pernambuco Brasil Open Series (2011)
- Recife Open (2011)
- Rijeka Open
- Rio Quente Resorts Tennis Classic (2012-2013)
- Rio Tennis Classic (2017, 2021)
- Rai Open
- RBC Tennis Championships of Dallas (1998-2020)
- RD Open (2017–2019, 2022–2024)
- Riviera di Rimini Challenger
- Roller Open
- s Tennis Masters Challenger
- Sacramento Challenger (2005–2015)
- Salzburg Indoors
- Salvador Challenger (2022)
- Salzburg Open (2021-2024)
- San Benedetto Tennis Cup
- Seguros Bolívar Open San José
- Samarkand Challenger
- Samsung Securities Cup (-2013)
- Sánchez-Casal Cup (-2024)
- Santiago Movistar Open (2015–2017)
- Sanremo Tennis Cup (2002-2010, 2022-2023)
- São Paulo Challenger de Tênis (2013-2021)
- Sarajevo Challenger (-2013)
- SAT Khorat Open
- SDA Tennis Open (2012)
- Seguros Bolívar Open Pereira (2009-2015)
- Shelbourne Irish Open
- Shenzhen Luohu Challenger (2023-2024)
- Shriram Capital P.L. Reddy Memorial Challenger (2014)
- Siberia Cup
- Sicilia Classic
- Soweto Open (2009–2013)
- Sparkasse Challenger Val Gardena Südtirol (2010-2023)
- Sparkasse Salzburg Open (2021–2024)
- Shimadzu All Japan Indoor Tennis Championships (-2018)
- Sparta Prague Open Challenger (-2023)
- Sporting Challenger (-2011)
- STRABAG Challenger Open (-2016)
- Status Athens Open (-2011)
- Stockton Challenger (2015-2018)
- Sunset Moulding YCRC Challenger (2005-2009)
- Surbiton (Lexus) Trophy (-2024)
- Taipei OEC Open (2024)
- TAC Cup China International Nanjing Challenger (2016)
- Tarka Challenger (2007)
- Taroii Open de Tênis (2013-2014)
- TEAN International (1996-2017)
- Tempe Challenger (2017)
- Tennis Championships of Maui (2010-2017)
- Tennislife Cup (-2011)
- Texas Tennis Classic (2023)
- Tianjin Health Industry Park (2014)
- Tilia Slovenia Open
- Torneio Internacional de Tênis Campos do Jordão (2001-2011)
- Torneo Omnia Tenis Ciudad Madrid (-2012)
- Trani Cup (-2011)
- Traralgon Challenger
- Troisdorf Challenger
- Trofeo Città di Brescia (2014-2017)
- Trofeo Paolo Corazzi (2008-2011)
- Trofeo Stefano Bellaveglia
- Trophée des Alpilles (2009-2016)
- Togliatti Cup (-2007)
- Torino Challenger (2022)
- Türk Telecom İzmir Cup
- USTA Challenger of Oklahoma (1999-2011)
- USTA LA Tennis Open (2005-2010)
- UTC Open by Selena (2007)
- Valencia (Santa Clarita) Challenger (2006–2007)
- Valle d'Aosta Open (2011)
- Venice Challenge Save Cup (2014-2018)
- Verrazzano Open (2019)
- Vietnam Open (tennis) (2015-2017)
- Vilnius Open (2022)
- Viña Challenger (2023)
- Visit Panamá Cup de Chitré
- Visit Panamá Tennis Cup
- Vitas Gerulaitis Cup (2023)
- Vivo Tennis Cup
- Voit Mexico City Open (-2007)
- Volkswagen Challenger
- Waikoloa Village Challenger
- Weil Tennis Academy Challenger
- West Side Tennis Club Clay Court Challenger - Forest Hills (2003-2007)
- Wolffkran Open (2017-2023)
- Wrocław Open (2015–2017)
- Yeongwol Challenger Tennis (2013)
- Yugra Cup
- Zagorka Cup (2009)
- ZS-Sports China Challenger - Qingdao (2016–2017)
- Zhuhai Open (2016-2023)
- ZRE Katowice Bytom Open (2007-2010)

=== Other tournaments ===
- All In Open
- Abruzzo Open Francavilla al Mare
- Acqua Dolomia Tennis Cup
- Advantage Cars Prague Open
- All Japan Indoor Tennis Championships
- American Express Istanbul Challenger
- Aspria Tennis Cup
- Athens Challenger
- Open Barranquilla
- Bauer Watertechnology Cup
- BFD Challenger
- BMW Tennis Championship
- Bogotá Challenger
- Bonn Open
- Brasília Tennis Open
- Bucaramanga Challenger (-2017, 2026-)
- Bucher Reisen Tennis Grand Prix
- Burnie International
- Cairo Open
- Caloundra International
- Camparini Gioielli Cup
- Campeonato Internacional de Tênis (-2022, 2025-)
- Canberra International (Apis) (2015-2018)
- Cary Tennis Classic (-2023, 2025-)
- Cattolica Challenger
- Challenger Città di Cervia
- Challenger AAT de TCA (2022-2024, 2026-)
- Challenger Banque Nationale de Drummondville
- Challenger Banque Nationale de Gatineau
- Challenger Biella (2014-2021, 2025-)
- Challenger Città di Lugano
- Challenger Ciudad de Guayaquil
- Challenger Córdoba
- Challenger de Buenos Aires
- Challenger de Tigre
- Challenger de Villa María (2022, 2025-)
- Challenger Dove Men+Care Antofagasta (2025-)
- Challenger Dove Men+Care Concepcion (2021-2025)
- Challenger Dove Men+Care Temuco (2022-2023)
- Challenger Dove Men+Care Santiago
- Challenger La Manche
- Challenger Santa Fe
- Challenger Tucumán
- Champaign Challenger
- Championnats Banque Nationale de Granby (-2022, 2024-)
- Charlottesville Men's Pro Challenger
- China International Suzhou (2015-2017, 2025-)
- City of Onkaparinga Tennis Challenger
- City of Playford Tennis International
- Cleveland Open
- CT (Clube Tenis) Porto Cup
- Columbus Challenger
- Copa San Cristóbal
- Copa Internacional de Tênis (2016, 2025-)
- Copa San Juan Gobierno
- Côte d'Ivoire Open
- Cranbrook Tennis Classic (2023-2024)
- Crete Challenger
- Delhi Open
- Dublin Challenger
- El Salvador Open
- Fairfield Challenger
- Florianópolis Challenger
- Fort Worth Challenger
- Glasgow Challenger
- Guzzini Challenger
- Gwangju Challenger
- Hong Kong ATP Challenger
- Hungarian Challenger Open
- Hyōgo Noah Challenger
- International Challenger Zhangjiagang
- Internationaux de Tennis de Vendée (-2018, 2025-)
- Internazionali di Tennis Città di Vicenza
- Internazionali di Tennis dell'Umbria
- IPP Open
- Islamabad Challenger
- Itajaí Open
- Izida Cup/Genesis Cup
- Jinan Open (2024)
- Jiujiang Challenger
- JSM Challenger of Champaign–Urbana
- Koblenz Open (2026-)
- Košice Open (-2014, 2026-)
- Kozerki Open (2025-)
- Knoxville Challenger
- Pune Challenger
- Las Vegas Tennis Open
- Lexus Nottingham Challenger
- Lexington Open
- Lima Challenger
- Liège Open
- Lincoln Challenger
- Los Inkas Open
- Macedonian Open
- Manama Challenger
- Manta Open - Trofeo Ricardo Delgado Aray (2004-2014, 2026-)
- MasterCard Tennis Cup
- Milo Open Cali
- Miyazaki Challenger (Koyushokucho)
- Modena Challenger
- Moldova Open (2025)
- Monastir Open
- Montemar Challenger (2024-2025)
- Morelos Open
- Murcia Open
- Mziuri Cup
- Nature's Way Sydney Tennis International
- Ningbo (Yinzhou) International Men's Tennis Challenger (2011-2012, 2026-)
- Nonthaburi Challenger
- Oeiras Indoors II
- Open Auvergne-Rhône-Alpes de Roanne
- Open BNP Paribas Banque de Bretagne
- Open Bogotá
- Open Castilla y León
- Open Citta' della Disfida
- Open Diputación Ciudad de Pozoblanco
- BNC Open Nouvelle-Calédonie (2004-2020, 2026-)
- Open Saint-Brieuc (2004-2024)
- Open Tarragona Costa Daurada
- Ostra Group Open
- Paraguay Open
- Phan Thiết Challenger
- Platzmann Open (2025)
- Plovdiv Challenger
- President's Cup
- Enea Poznań Open (-2022, 2024)
- Punta del Este Open
- Racket Club Open
- Rafa Nadal Open
- Roma Garden Open
- Royan Open
- Rwanda Challenger I
- Santaizi Challenger (-2024)
- San Diego Open 2
- San Luis Tennis Open
- São Léo Open
- Elizabeth Moore Sarasota Open
- Savannah Challenger
- Schwaben Open
- Shymkent Challenger (2017-2019, 2022, 2026-)
- Sibiu Open
- Sioux Falls Challenger (2024)
- Slovak Open (-2022)
- Slovenia Open
- Soma Bay Open
- Sparkassen/Brawo Open (-2021)
- Svijany Open
- Tallahassee Tennis Challenger
- Tampere Open
- Târgu Mureș Challenger
- Tashkent Challenger
- Tennislife Cup
- Tetra Pak Tennis Cup
- Thionville Open
- Tiburon Challenger (-2025)
- Torneio Internacional Masculino de Tênis
- Torneo Città di Como
- Torneo Internacional Challenger León
- Trofeo Città di Cesenatico
- Trofeo Faip–Perrel (2006-2023)
- Tunis Open
- Uruguay Open (-2022)
- Winnipeg National Bank Challenger
- Winston-Salem Challenger
- Wuhai Challenger
- Wuning Challenger
- Yokkaichi Challenger (2019, 2022, 2024, 2026-)
- Yokohama Keio Challenger
- Yucatán Open
- Yugra Cup
- Zadar Open
- Zagreb Open
- Zhuhai Open

== See also ==
- 2026 ATP Challenger Tour
- ATP Tour
- Men's World Tennis Tour
- WTA 125 tournaments
