= Tiago Pereira (tennis) =

Portuguese tennis player (born 2004)

- Country (sports): Portugal
- Born: 20 June 2004 (age 22) Faro, Portugal
- Plays: Right-handed (two-handed backhand)
- Coach: Pedro Pereira
- Prize money: US $242,962

Singles
- Career record: 0–1 (at ATP Tour level, Grand Slam level, and in Davis Cup)
- Career titles: 3 ITF
- Highest ranking: No. 260 (17 November 2025)
- Current ranking: No. 319 (26 October 2026)

Doubles
- Career record: 0–1 (at ATP Tour level, Grand Slam level, and in Davis Cup)
- Career titles: 1 Challenger, 12 ITF
- Highest ranking: No. 102 (26 October 2026)
- Current ranking: No. 102 (26 October 2026)
- Last updated on: 26 October 2026.

Tiago Pereira (born 20 June 2004) is a Portuguese tennis player. Pereira has a career high ATP singles ranking of No. 260 achieved on 17 November 2025 and a career high ATP doubles ranking of No. 102 achieved on 26 October 2026.

Pereira has won three ATP Challenger doubles titles. The first at the 2025 Maia Challenger, followed by 2026 Crete Challenger II and the 2026 Montemar Challenger in Alicante.

== ATP Challenger and ITF World Tennis Tour finals ==
=== Singles: 11 (5 titles, 6 runner-ups) ===
Legend ATP Challenger Tour (0–0) ITF World Tennis Tour (5–6)	Finals by surface Hard (4–4) Clay (1–2)

Result	W–L	Date	Tournament	Tier	Surface	Opponent	Score
Win	1–0	May 2024	M15 Monastir, Tunisia	WTT	Hard	(France) Arthur Bouquier	7–6^{(7–2)}, 6–2
Win	2–0	Jun 2024	M15 Monastir, Tunisia	WTT	Hard	(New Zealand) Jack Loutit	6–2, 6–0
Loss	2–1	Feb 2025	M25 Faro, Portugal	WTT	Hard	(Germany) Marko Topo	1–6, 6–3, 1–6
Loss	2–2	Mar 2025	M25 Vale do Lobo, Portugal	WTT	Hard	(United Kingdom) George Loffhagen	0–6, 5–7
Loss	2–3	May 2025	M25 Bol, Croatia	WTT	Clay	(France) Laurent Lokoli	4–6, 6–4, 4–6
Loss	2–4	Jun 2025	M25 Bol, Croatia	WTT	Clay	(Germany) Rudolf Molleker	4–6, 7–6^{(7–5)}, 3–6
Loss	2–5	Jun 2025	M25 Monastir, Tunisia	WTT	Hard	(Tunisia) Moez Echargui	3–6, 4–6
Win	3–5	Jul 2025	M25 Figueira da Foz, Portugal	WTT	Hard	(United States) Darwin Blanch	6–2, 6–1
Loss	3–6	Nov 2025	M25 Monastir, Tunisia	WTT	Hard	(Italy) Jacopo Berrettini	6–7^{(2–7)}, 2–6
Win	4–6	May 2026	M25 Figueira da Foz, Portugal	WTT	Hard	(Portugal) João Domingues	6–4, 6–4
Win	5–6	Jul 2026	M25 Koszalin, Poland	WTT	Clay	(North Macedonia) Oleg Prihodko	6–1, 7–5

=== Doubles: 36 (21 titles, 15 runner-ups) ===
Legend ATP Challenger Tour (6–5) ITF World Tennis Tour (15–10)	Finals by surface Hard (16–11) Clay (5–4)

Result	W–L	Date	Tournament	Tier	Surface	Partner	Opponents	Score
Loss	0–1	Jul 2024	Open Castilla y León, Spain	Challenger	Hard	(Bulgaria) Alexander Donski	(France) Dan Added (France) Arthur Reymond	4–6, 3–6
Loss	0–2	Apr 2025	Open Città della Disfida, Italy	Challenger	Clay	(Netherlands) Mats Hermans	(Peru) Alexander Merino (Germany) Christoph Negritu	6–7^{(5–7)}, 2–6
Win	1–2	Nov 2025	Maia Challenger, Portugal	Challenger	Clay (i)	(Bulgaria) Alexander Donski	(France) Théo Arribagé (Croatia) Nino Serdarušić	6–2, 7–6^{(8–6)}
Loss	1–3	Feb 2026	Tenerife Challenger II, Spain	Challenger	Hard	(Croatia) Luka Mikrut	(Czech Republic) Filip Duda (Czech Republic) David Poljak	6–7^{(0–7)}, 3–6
Win	2–3	Mar 2026	Crete Challenger II, Greece	Challenger	Hard	(Belgium) Michael Geerts	(Bulgaria) Petr Nesterov (Ukraine) Oleksandr Ovcharenko	3–6, 6–4, [10–5]
Win	3–3	Mar 2026	Montemar Challenger, Spain	Challenger	Clay	(Poland) Szymon Kielan	(Colombia) Nicolás Barrientos (Uruguay) Ariel Behar	4–6, 6–3, [15–13]
Loss	3–4	May 2026	Open de Oeiras II, Portugal	Challenger	Clay	(Spain) David Vega Hernández	(India) Siddhant Banthia (Bulgaria) Alexander Donski	3–6, 2–6
Win	4–4	Sep 2026	Szczecin Open, Poland	Challenger	Clay	(Czech Republic) Andrew Paulson	(Spain) Iñigo Cervantes (Ukraine) Denys Molchanov	6–2, 6–0
Loss	4–5	Oct 2026	Maia Challenger, Portugal	Challenger	Clay (i)	(Spain) Benjamín Winter López	(Slovakia) Miloš Karol (Czech Republic) Andrew Paulson	6–4, 1–6, [9–11]
Win	5–5	Oct 2026	Lisboa Belém Open, Portugal	Challenger	Clay	(Spain) Benjamín Winter López	(Poland) Karol Drzewiecki (Poland) Piotr Matuszewski	4–6, 6–3, [10–5]
Win	6–5	Nov 2026	Monastir Open, Tunisia	Challenger	Hard	(Czech Republic) Filip Duda	(United Kingdom) James MacKinlay (India) Jeevan Nedunchezhiyan	7–6^{(7–1)}, 7–6^{(7–2)}
Loss	0–1	Nov 2022	M15 Monastir, Tunisia	WTT	Hard	(Netherlands) Jarno Jans	(France) Constantin Bittoun Kouzmine (Germany) Kai Wehnelt	6–7^{(2–7)}, 7–6^{(10–8)}, [4–10]
Loss	0–2	Dec 2022	M15 Monastir, Tunisia	WTT	Hard	(Belgium) Olivier Rojas	(France) Cyril Vandermeersch (Germany) Kai Wehnelt	6–1, 2–6, [6–10]
Loss	0–3	Jan 2023	M15 Monastir, Tunisia	WTT	Hard	(Portugal) Daniel Rodrigues	(United States) Colin Markes (United States) Andrew Rogers	5–7, 3–6
Loss	0–4	Mar 2023	M15 Monastir, Tunisia	WTT	Hard	(Tunisia) Wissam Abderrahman	(China) Dong Bohua (China) Gao Xin	6–7^{(5–7)}, 6–3, [5–10]
Win	1–4	Jul 2023	M15 Monastir, Tunisia	WTT	Hard	(Tunisia) Wissam Abderrahman	Igor Kudriashov; Aleksandr Lobanov	3–6, 6–1, [10–4]
Loss	1–5	Sep 2023	M25 Idanha-a-Nova, Portugal	WTT	Hard	(Portugal) Gonçalo Falcão	(Denmark) Johannes Ingildsen (United Kingdom) Harry Wendelken	6–7^{(3–7)}, 2–6
Loss	1–6	Nov 2023	M15 Monastir, Tunisia	WTT	Hard	(Bulgaria) Alexander Donski	(Netherlands) Daniel de Jonge (Germany) John Sperle	walkover
Win	2–6	Dec 2023	M15 Monastir, Tunisia	WTT	Hard	(Bulgaria) Alexander Donski	(Germany) Christoph Negritu (United States) Michael Zhu	6–2, 2–1, ret.
Win	3–6	Feb 2024	M25 Faro, Portugal	WTT	Hard	(Bulgaria) Alexander Donski	(Sweden) Simon Freund (Denmark) Johannes Ingildsen	6–4, 3–6, [10–7]
Loss	3–7	Feb 2024	M25 Quinta do Lago, Portugal	WTT	Hard	(Bulgaria) Alexander Donski	(Brazil) Gabriel Décamps (Finland) Eero Vasa	2–7, 7–6^{(7–3)}, [7–10]
Win	4–7	Mar 2024	M25 Vale do Lobo, Portugal	WTT	Hard	(Bulgaria) Alexander Donski	(Spain) Alberto Barroso Campos (Spain) Imanol López Morillo	6–4, 4–6, [10–8]
Win	5–7	Mar 2024	M25 Loulé, Portugal	WTT	Hard	(Bulgaria) Alexander Donski	(France) Dan Added (Czech Republic) Jakub Nicod	7–6^{(8–6)}, 2–6, [10–1]
Win	6–7	Apr 2024	M15 Monastir, Tunisia	WTT	Hard	(Bulgaria) Alexander Donski	(United States) Jordan Chiu (Sweden) Fred Simonsson	6–4, 6–2
Loss	6–8	Apr 2024	M15 Sanxenxo, Spain	WTT	Hard	(Spain) Rafael Izquierdo Luque	(Portugal) Rodrigo Fernandes (Portugal) Gonçalo Marques	6–3, 6–7^{(2–7)}, [7–10]
Win	7–8	Jun 2024	M15 Monastir, Tunisia	WTT	Hard	(Switzerland) Patrick Schön	(Mexico) Alan Magadán (Portugal) Tomás Pinho	6–1, 6–7^{(6–8)}, [10–7]
Win	8–8	Aug 2024	M25 Idanha-a-Nova, Portugal	WTT	Hard	(Portugal) Diogo Marques	(Germany) Lucas Deliano (Uzbekistan) Khumoyun Sultanov	6–4, 7–5
Win	9–8	Oct 2024	M25 Sintra, Portugal	WTT	Hard	(Portugal) Duarte Vale	(India) Siddhant Banthia (India) Divij Sharan	6–3, 6–3
Win	10–8	Nov 2024	M25 Monastir, Tunisia	WTT	Hard	(France) Kenny de Schepper	(United States) Dali Blanch (United States) Keshav Chopra	6–2, 6–1
Loss	10–9	Dec 2024	M15 Ceuta, Spain	WTT	Hard	(Spain) John Echeverría	(Spain) Carlos Divar (Spain) Mario González Fernández	6–2, 4–6, [6–10]
Win	11–9	Mar 2025	M25 Quinta do Lago, Portugal	WTT	Hard	(Portugal) Diogo Marques	(Finland) Patrick Kaukovalta (Estonia) Johannes Seeman	6–2, 6–4
Loss	11–10	May 2025	M25 Bol, Croatia	WTT	Clay	(Spain) Alberto Barroso Campos	(France) Dan Added (Croatia) Nino Serdarušić	1–6, 4–6
Win	12–10	May 2025	M25 Monastir, Tunisia	WTT	Hard	(Spain) Iñaki Montes de la Torre	(Poland) Szymon Kielan (Poland) Filip Pieczonka	6–7^{(5–7)}, 6–3, [10–8]
Win	13–10	Mar 2026	M25 Vale do Lobo, Portugal	WTT	Hard	(Canada) Justin Boulais	(Portugal) João Domingues (Portugal) Diogo Marques	6–2, 6–3
Win	14–10	May 2026	M25 Loulé, Portugal	WTT	Hard	(Canada) Justin Boulais	(Australia) Thomas Fancutt (New Zealand) Ajeet Rai	7–6^{(7–5)}, 6–7^{(3–7)}, [10–4]
Win	15–10	Jul 2026	M25 Koszalin, Poland	WTT	Clay	(Poland) Oskar Grzegorzewski	(Czech Republic) Jan Hrazdil (Czech Republic) Štěpán Pecák	6–4, 6–3
