= Montemar Challenger =

Montemar Ene Construcción
- 2026 Montemar Challenger

ATP Challenger Tour
- Location: La Albufereta , Alicante, Province of Alicante, Spain
- Venue: Club Atlético Montemar
- Category: Challenger 100 (2026-), ATP Challenger Tour (2024-2025)
- Surface: Clay
- Prize money: €160,680 (2026), €91,250 (2025), €74,285 (2024)
- Website: website

The Montemar Ene Construcción is a professional tennis tournament played on clay courts. It is currently part of the ATP Challenger Tour. It was first held at the Club Atlético Montemar in Alicante, Spain in 2024. In 2026, the event was upgraded to a Challenger 100.

== Past finals ==
=== Singles ===
Year	Champion	Runner-up	Score
2026	(Spain) Pablo Llamas Ruiz	(Spain) Pablo Carreño Busta	6–4, 6–2
2025	(Czech Republic) Zdeněk Kolář	(Italy) Gianluca Cadenasso	6–4, 6–4
2024	(Italy) Fabio Fognini	(Austria) Lukas Neumayer	6–3, 2–6, 6–3

=== Doubles ===
Year	Champions	Runners-up	Score
2026	(Poland) Szymon Kielan (Portugal) Tiago Pereira	(Colombia) Nicolás Barrientos (Uruguay) Ariel Behar	4–6, 6–3, [15–13]
2025	(Sweden) Erik Grevelius (Sweden) Adam Heinonen	(Italy) Federico Bondioli (Italy) Gianluca Cadenasso	6–3, 6–3
2024	(Poland) Karol Drzewiecki (Poland) Piotr Matuszewski	(Spain) Daniel Rincón (Jordan) Abdullah Shelbayh	6–3, 6–4
