= Paraguay Open =

- 2025 Paraguay Open

ATP Challenger Tour
- Event name: Munich Ultra Paraguay Open (2026-), Paraguay Open Babolat (2025), Paraguay Open Dove Men+Care (2024)
- Location: Asunción, Paraguay
- Venue: Club Internacional de Tenis (CIT)
- Category: ATP Challenger Tour
- Surface: Clay
- Prize money: $107,000 (2026), $100,000 (2025)

Current champions (2026)
- Singles: (Italy) Gianluca Cadenasso
- Doubles: (Argentina) Mariano Kestelboim (Brazil) Marcelo Zormann

The Munich Ultra Paraguay Open is a professional tennis tournament played on clay courts. It is currently part of the ATP Challenger Tour. It was first held in Asunción, Paraguay in 2024.

== Past finals ==
=== Singles ===
Year	Champion	Runner-up	Score
2026	(Italy) Gianluca Cadenasso	(Uruguay) Franco Roncadelli	7–6^{(7–5)}, 6–0
2025	(United States) Emilio Nava	(Brazil) Thiago Monteiro	7–5, 6–3
2024	(Brazil) Gustavo Heide	(Brazil) João Fonseca	7–5, 6–7^{(6–8)}, 6–1

=== Doubles ===
Year	Champions	Runners-up	Score
2026	(Argentina) Mariano Kestelboim (Brazil) Marcelo Zormann	(United States) Mac Kiger (United States) Reese Stalder	6–4, 7–5
2025	(United States) Vasil Kirkov (Chile) Matías Soto	(Argentina) Guillermo Durán (Argentina) Mariano Kestelboim	6–3, 6–4
2024	(Bolivia) Boris Arias (Bolivia) Federico Zeballos	(Peru) Gonzalo Bueno (Ecuador) Álvaro Guillén Meza	6–2, 6–2
