= 2023 AON Open Challenger – Singles =

Singles
- 2023 AON Open Challenger

Final
- Champion: (Brazil) Thiago Seyboth Wild
- Runner-up: (Italy) Fabio Fognini
- Score: 6–2, 7–6^{(7–3)}

Events
Singles	Doubles
← 2022 ·	AON Open Challenger	· 2024 →

Thiago Monteiro was the defending champion but lost in the semifinals to Fabio Fognini.

Thiago Seyboth Wild won the title after defeating Fognini 6–2, 7–6^{(7–3)} in the final.

== Seeds ==
1. Alexander Shevchenko (second round)
2. (Argentina) Federico Coria (quarterfinals)
3. (Brazil) Thiago Seyboth Wild (champion)
4. (Hungary) Zsombor Piros (quarterfinals)
5. (Brazil) Thiago Monteiro (semifinals)
6. (France) Benoît Paire (first round)
7. (Italy) Fabio Fognini (final)
8. (Italy) Andrea Vavassori (semifinals, retired)

== Draw ==
=== Key ===
- Q = Qualifier
- WC = Wild card
- LL = Lucky loser
- Alt = Alternate
- SE = Special exempt
- PR = Protected ranking
- ITF = ITF entry
- JE = Junior exempt
- w/o = Walkover
- r = Retired
- d = Defaulted
- SR = Special ranking

=== Finals ===
Semifinals
5	(Brazil) Thiago Monteiro	2	4
7	(Italy) Fabio Fognini	6	6
3	(Brazil) Thiago Seyboth Wild	4
8	(Italy) Andrea Vavassori	3^{r}

Final
7	(Italy) Fabio Fognini	2	6^{3}
3	(Brazil) Thiago Seyboth Wild	6	7^{7}

=== Top half ===
First round
1	A Shevchenko	2	7^{9}	6
WC	(Italy) Marcello Serafini	6	6^{7}	3
Q	(Chinese Taipei) C-h Tseng	6	6
Q	(Italy) Federico Iannaccone	2	0
(Italy) F Maestrelli	3	6	3
Q	(Italy) L Rottoli	6	3	6
(Italy) S Travaglia	2	6	4
5	(Brazil) T Monteiro	6	1	6
4	(Hungary) Z Piros	7^{7}	6
(Italy) A Pellegrino	6^{0}	3
(France) K Jacquet	4	0
(Italy) F Passaro	6	6
(Italy) S Caruso	3	6	3
Q	(Italy) G Oradini	6	1	6
(Monaco) V Vacherot	5	4
7	(Italy) F Fognini	7	6

Second round
1	A Shevchenko	6	5	1
Q	(Chinese Taipei) C-h Tseng	3	7	6
Q	(Italy) L Rottoli	3	2
5	(Brazil) T Monteiro	6	6
4	(Hungary) Z Piros	6	3	6
(Italy) F Passaro	3	6	2
Q	(Italy) G Oradini	0	3
7	(Italy) F Fognini	6	6

Quarterfinals
Q	(Chinese Taipei) C-h Tseng	2	1
5	(Brazil) T Monteiro	6	6
4	(Hungary) Z Piros	4	4
7	(Italy) F Fognini	6	6

Semifinals
5	(Brazil) T Monteiro	2	4
7	(Italy) F Fognini	6	6

=== Bottom half ===
First round
6	(France) B Paire	7^{7}	4	3
LL	(Serbia) M Zekić	6^{2}	6	6
(Italy) M Gigante	3	1
(Italy) S Napolitano	6	6
WC	(Italy) E Dalla Valle	0	6	1
Q	(Italy) Andrea Picchione	6	1	6
(Italy) R Bonadio	6	6^{5}	1
3	(Brazil) T Seyboth Wild	4	7^{7}	6
8	(Italy) A Vavassori	7^{7}	6
(Croatia) D Ajduković	6^{3}	2
WC	(Italy) G Fonio	6^{5}	6	3
(Italy) F Agamenone	7^{7}	4	6
Q	(Lebanon) H Habib	6	7^{7}
(Romania) ND Ionel	3	6^{5}
(Croatia) N Serdarušić	5	4
2	(Argentina) F Coria	7	6

Second round
LL	(Serbia) M Zekić	3	4
(Italy) S Napolitano	6	6
Q	(Italy) A Picchione	4	6^{7}
3	(Brazil) T Seyboth Wild	6	7^{9}
8	(Italy) A Vavassori	6	6
(Italy) F Agamenone	1	2
Q	(Lebanon) H Habib	4	3
2	(Argentina) F Coria	6	6

Quarterfinals
(Italy) S Napolitano	5	3
3	(Brazil) T Seyboth Wild	7	6
8	(Italy) A Vavassori	6	6
2	(Argentina) F Coria	0	3

Semifinals
3	(Brazil) T Seyboth Wild	4
8	(Italy) A Vavassori	3^{r}
