= 2023 AON Open Challenger – Doubles =

Doubles
- 2023 AON Open Challenger

Final
- Champions: (Italy) Giovanni Oradini (Italy) Lorenzo Rottoli
- Runners-up: (Serbia) Ivan Sabanov (Serbia) Matej Sabanov
- Score: 6–4, 6–3

Events
| Singles | Doubles |
| ← 2022 · | AON Open Challenger | · 2024 → |

Dustin Brown and Andrea Vavassori were the defending champions but only Vavassori chose to defend his title, partnering Andrea Pellegrino. Vavassori lost in the semifinals to Ivan and Matej Sabanov.

Giovanni Oradini and Lorenzo Rottoli won the title after defeating Sabanov and Sabanov 6–4, 6–3 in the final.

== Seeds ==
1. (Italy) Andrea Pellegrino / (Italy) Andrea Vavassori (semifinals)
2. (United States) Evan King / (United States) Reese Stalder (first round)
3. (Germany) Constantin Frantzen / (Germany) Hendrik Jebens (quarterfinals)
4. Ivan Liutarevich / (Ukraine) Vladyslav Manafov (quarterfinals)

== Draw ==
=== Key ===
- Q = Qualifier
- WC = Wild card
- LL = Lucky loser
- Alt = Alternate
- ITF = ITF entry
- PR = Protected ranking
- SR = Special ranking
- SE = Special exempt
- JE = Junior exempt
- JR = Junior Accelerator Programme entrant
- CO = College Accelerator Programme entrant
- NG = Next Gen Accelerator Program entrant
- w/o = Walkover
- r = Retired
- d = Defaulted

First round
1 | (Italy) A Pellegrino (Italy) A Vavassori | 6 | 6
(Italy) E Dalla Valle (Italy) S Travaglia | 2 | 2
(Ukraine) V Uzhylovskyi (Italy) Samuel Vincent Ruggeri | 6 | 6
(Italy) R Bonadio (Italy) S Caruso | 4 | 3
3 | (Germany) C Frantzen (Germany) H Jebens | 6 | 6
WC | (Italy) A Arnaboldi (Italy) F Arnaboldi | 4 | 3
(Serbia) I Sabanov (Serbia) M Sabanov | 4 | 6 | [12]
WC | (Italy) F Maestrelli (Italy) F Romano | 6 | 4 | [10]
(Italy) M Bortolotti (Italy) F Passaro | 5 | 1
(Italy) F Forti (Italy) J Ocleppo | 7 | 6
(Sweden) F Bergevi (Philippines) R Gonzales | 5 | 3
4 | I Liutarevich (Ukraine) V Manafov | 7 | 6
(Italy) G Fonio (Romania) A Jecan | 6^{2} | 6^{11}
(Brazil) T Monteiro (Brazil) T Seyboth Wild | 7^{7} | 7^{13}
Alt | (Italy) G Oradini (Italy) L Rottoli | 3 | 7^{8} | [10]
2 | (United States) E King (United States) R Stalder | 6 | 6^{6} | [8]

Quarterfinals
1 | (Italy) A Pellegrino (Italy) A Vavassori | 3 | 7^{7} | [10]
(Ukraine) V Uzhylovskyi (Italy) S Vincent Ruggeri | 6 | 6^{4} | [3]
3 | (Germany) C Frantzen (Germany) H Jebens | 6^{2} | 6 | [4]
(Serbia) I Sabanov (Serbia) M Sabanov | 7^{7} | 3 | [10]
(Italy) F Forti (Italy) J Ocleppo | 3 | 6 | [13]
4 | I Liutarevich (Ukraine) V Manafov | 6 | 3 | [11]
(Brazil) T Monteiro (Brazil) T Seyboth Wild
Alt | (Italy) G Oradini (Italy) L Rottoli | w/o

Semifinals
1 | (Italy) A Pellegrino (Italy) A Vavassori | 6 | 4 | [9]
(Serbia) I Sabanov (Serbia) M Sabanov | 1 | 6 | [11]
(Italy) F Forti (Italy) J Ocleppo | 7^{11} | 2 | [9]
Alt | (Italy) G Oradini (Italy) L Rottoli | 6^{9} | 6 | [11]

Final
(Serbia) I Sabanov (Serbia) M Sabanov | 4 | 3
Alt | (Italy) G Oradini (Italy) L Rottoli | 6 | 6
