= 2023 ITF Men's World Tennis Tour (April–June) =

2023 edition of the third-tier tour for men's professional tennis

The 2023 ITF Men's World Tennis Tour is the 2023 edition of the second-tier tour for men's professional tennis. It is organised by the International Tennis Federation and is a tier below the ATP Challenger Tour. The ITF Men's World Tennis Tour includes tournaments with prize money ranging from $15,000 to $25,000.

Since 2022, following the Russian invasion of Ukraine the ITF announced that players from Belarus and Russia could still play on the tour but would not be allowed to play under the flag of Belarus or Russia.

== Key ==
M25 tournaments
M15 tournaments

== Month ==
=== April ===
Week of	Tournament	Winner	Runners-up	Semifinalists	Quarterfinalists
April 3	Santa Margherita di Pula, Italy; Clay; M25; Singles and Doubles Draws	(Poland) Daniel Michalski; 6–4, 6–3	(France) Timo Legout	(Portugal) Gonçalo Oliveira (Italy) Gianmarco Ferrari	(Italy) Francesco Forti (France) Mathys Erhard (Italy) Pietro Pampanin (Italy) Fabrizio Andaloro
April 3	Santa Margherita di Pula, Italy; Clay; M25; Singles and Doubles Draws	(Italy) Niccolò Baroni (Italy) Federico Cinà; 6–1, 6–4	(Canada) Roy Stepanov (United States) Tennyson Whiting	(Portugal) Gonçalo Oliveira (Italy) Gianmarco Ferrari	(Italy) Francesco Forti (France) Mathys Erhard (Italy) Pietro Pampanin (Italy) Fabrizio Andaloro
April 3	Kashiwa, Japan; Hard; M25; Singles and Doubles Draws	(Chinese Taipei) Hsu Yu-hsiou; 6–1, 6–1	(South Korea) Lee Jea-moon	(Japan) Hikaru Shiraishi (Japan) Renta Tokuda	(South Korea) Chung Yun-seong (Japan) Yuta Shimizu (Japan) Rimpei Kawakami (Japan) Kaito Uesugi
April 3	Kashiwa, Japan; Hard; M25; Singles and Doubles Draws	(Chinese Taipei) Hsu Yu-hsiou (Chinese Taipei) Huang Tsung-hao; 7–6^{(7–5)}, 2–6, [12–10]	(South Korea) Chung Yun-seong (Japan) Shintaro Imai	(Japan) Hikaru Shiraishi (Japan) Renta Tokuda	(South Korea) Chung Yun-seong (Japan) Yuta Shimizu (Japan) Rimpei Kawakami (Japan) Kaito Uesugi
April 3	Dubrovnik, Croatia; Clay; M25; Singles and Doubles Draws	(Croatia) Duje Ajduković; 6–3, 6–2	(Croatia) Luka Mikrut	(Bosnia and Herzegovina) Aldin Šetkić (Romania) Cezar Crețu	(Romania) Sebastian Gima (Bosnia and Herzegovina) Radomir Tomić (Ukraine) Eric Vanshelboim (Bulgaria) Simon Anthony Ivanov
April 3	Dubrovnik, Croatia; Clay; M25; Singles and Doubles Draws	(Australia) Adam Taylor (Ukraine) Eric Vanshelboim; 6–4, 6–4	(Croatia) Nikola Bašić (Ukraine) Ivan Kremenchutskyi	(Bosnia and Herzegovina) Aldin Šetkić (Romania) Cezar Crețu	(Romania) Sebastian Gima (Bosnia and Herzegovina) Radomir Tomić (Ukraine) Eric Vanshelboim (Bulgaria) Simon Anthony Ivanov
April 3	Reus, Spain; Clay; M25; Singles and Doubles Draws	(Lithuania) Vilius Gaubas; 6–4, 6–4	(Spain) Miguel Damas	(Spain) Pol Martín Tiffon (Spain) Alejandro Manzanera Pertusa	(Spain) Àlex Martí Pujolràs (Spain) Imanol López Morillo (Spain) Nikolás Sánchez Izquierdo (Portugal) Jaime Faria
April 3	Reus, Spain; Clay; M25; Singles and Doubles Draws	(Spain) Imanol López Morillo (Spain) Benjamín Winter López; 4–6, 6–2, [10–6]	(Netherlands) Ryan Nijboer (Germany) Louis Wessels	(Spain) Pol Martín Tiffon (Spain) Alejandro Manzanera Pertusa	(Spain) Àlex Martí Pujolràs (Spain) Imanol López Morillo (Spain) Nikolás Sánchez Izquierdo (Portugal) Jaime Faria
April 3	Lons-le-Saunier, France; Hard (i); M15; Singles and Doubles Draws	(France) Sascha Gueymard Wayenburg; 6–4, 7–6^{(7–5)}	(Germany) Florian Broska	(Netherlands) Alec Deckers (France) Arthur Bouquier	(France) Maxence Beaugé (France) Lucas Poullain (Switzerland) Luca Castelnuovo (France) Loann Massard
April 3	Lons-le-Saunier, France; Hard (i); M15; Singles and Doubles Draws	(Germany) Florian Broska (Germany) Jakob Schnaitter; 6–4, 4–6, [10–3]	(Switzerland) Luca Castelnuovo (Switzerland) Yannik Steinegger	(Netherlands) Alec Deckers (France) Arthur Bouquier	(France) Maxence Beaugé (France) Lucas Poullain (Switzerland) Luca Castelnuovo (France) Loann Massard
April 3	Sharm El Sheikh, Egypt; Hard; M15; Singles and Doubles Draws	Evgenii Tiurnev; 1–6, 7–6^{(7–5)}, 7–6^{(7–5)}	(Georgia (country)) Saba Purtseladze	(Luxembourg) Alex Knaff (South Africa) Alec Beckley	(Spain) John Echeverría (South Africa) Kris van Wyk (Moldova) Alexander Cozbinov (Italy) Samuel Vincent Ruggeri
April 3	Sharm El Sheikh, Egypt; Hard; M15; Singles and Doubles Draws	Nikita Ianin; Aleksandr Lobanov; 6–7^{(5–7)}, 7–6^{(7–5)}, [11–9]	Evgenii Tiurnev; Semen Voronin	(Luxembourg) Alex Knaff (South Africa) Alec Beckley	(Spain) John Echeverría (South Africa) Kris van Wyk (Moldova) Alexander Cozbinov (Italy) Samuel Vincent Ruggeri
April 3	Singapore, Singapore; Hard; M15; Singles and Doubles Draws	(Australia) Dayne Kelly; 7–5, 2–6, 7–6^{(8–6)}	(France) Arthur Weber	(South Korea) Shin San-hui (Australia) Matthew Dellavedova	(Thailand) Palaphoom Kovapitukted (China) Sun Fajing (Sweden) Leo Borg (South Korea) Lee Duck-hee
April 3	Singapore, Singapore; Hard; M15; Singles and Doubles Draws	(Indonesia) Justin Barki (Netherlands) Igor Sijsling; 6–1, 6–1	(Philippines) Francis Alcantara (China) Sun Fajing	(South Korea) Shin San-hui (Australia) Matthew Dellavedova	(Thailand) Palaphoom Kovapitukted (China) Sun Fajing (Sweden) Leo Borg (South Korea) Lee Duck-hee
April 3	Santo Domingo de los Tsáchilas, Ecuador; Clay; M15; Singles and Doubles Draws	(Peru) Gonzalo Bueno; 6–2, 6–1	(Ecuador) Andrés Andrade	(Uruguay) Franco Roncadelli (Colombia) Johan Alexander Rodríguez Rodríguez	(Ecuador) Álvaro Guillén Meza (Japan) Kosuke Ogura (Georgia (country)) Aleksandre Metreveli (Argentina) Ignacio Monzón
April 3	Santo Domingo de los Tsáchilas, Ecuador; Clay; M15; Singles and Doubles Draws	(Canada) Juan Carlos Aguilar (United States) Ezekiel Clark; 6–1, 7–5	(Brazil) Mateo Barreiros Reyes (United States) Victor Lilov	(Uruguay) Franco Roncadelli (Colombia) Johan Alexander Rodríguez Rodríguez	(Ecuador) Álvaro Guillén Meza (Japan) Kosuke Ogura (Georgia (country)) Aleksandre Metreveli (Argentina) Ignacio Monzón
April 3	Chennai, India; Hard; M15; Singles and Doubles Draws	(India) Digvijay Pratap Singh; 6–4, 7–6^{(7–3)}	(India) Sidharth Rawat	(India) Manish Sureshkumar (India) Ramkumar Ramanathan	(Ukraine) Vladyslav Orlov (France) Florent Bax (Spain) David Pérez Sanz (India) Niki Kaliyanda Poonacha
April 3	Chennai, India; Hard; M15; Singles and Doubles Draws	(India) Nitin Kumar Sinha (India) Vishnu Vardhan; 6–1, 6–7^{(2–7)}, [10–7]	(India) Sai Karteek Reddy Ganta (India) Theertha Shashank Macherla	(India) Manish Sureshkumar (India) Ramkumar Ramanathan	(Ukraine) Vladyslav Orlov (France) Florent Bax (Spain) David Pérez Sanz (India) Niki Kaliyanda Poonacha
April 3	Antalya, Turkey; Clay; M15; Singles and Doubles Draws	(Sweden) Dragoș Nicolae Mădăraș; 6–0, 6–1	(Netherlands) Sidané Pontjodikromo	(Netherlands) Deney Wassermann (Bulgaria) Yanaki Milev	Denis Klok (Italy) Marco Miceli (Argentina) Juan Pablo Paz (Netherlands) Max Houkes
April 3	Antalya, Turkey; Clay; M15; Singles and Doubles Draws	(Brazil) Igor Gimenez (Italy) Elio José Ribeiro Lago; 6–4, 6–7^{(5–7)}, [10–5]	Svyatoslav Gulin; Ilya Rudiukov	(Netherlands) Deney Wassermann (Bulgaria) Yanaki Milev	Denis Klok (Italy) Marco Miceli (Argentina) Juan Pablo Paz (Netherlands) Max Houkes
April 3	Monastir, Tunisia; Hard; M15; Singles and Doubles Draws	(Australia) Li Tu; 3–6, 6–4, 6–4	(Portugal) Daniel Rodrigues	(France) Louis Dussin (Ivory Coast) Eliakim Coulibaly	(France) Nicolas Tepmahc (Italy) Massimo Giunta; Daniil Ostapenkov (China) Xiao Linang
April 3	Monastir, Tunisia; Hard; M15; Singles and Doubles Draws	(France) Constantin Bittoun Kouzmine (France) Axel Garcian; 6–2, 6–1	(Germany) Mark Wallner (Germany) Luca Wiedenmann	(France) Louis Dussin (Ivory Coast) Eliakim Coulibaly	(France) Nicolas Tepmahc (Italy) Massimo Giunta; Daniil Ostapenkov (China) Xiao Linang
April 10	Sharm El Sheikh, Egypt; Hard; M25; Singles and Doubles Draws	(Georgia (country)) Saba Purtseladze; 6–4, 7–5	Alibek Kachmazov	(Uzbekistan) Sergey Fomin (Italy) Samuel Vincent Ruggeri	(South Africa) Kris van Wyk (France) Jules Marie; Ilia Simakin (Luxembourg) Alex Knaff
April 10	Sharm El Sheikh, Egypt; Hard; M25; Singles and Doubles Draws	(Uzbekistan) Sergey Fomin; Alibek Kachmazov; 6–2, 6–3	(Moldova) Alexander Cozbinov (Denmark) August Holmgren	(Uzbekistan) Sergey Fomin (Italy) Samuel Vincent Ruggeri	(South Africa) Kris van Wyk (France) Jules Marie; Ilia Simakin (Luxembourg) Alex Knaff
April 10	Jakarta, Indonesia; Hard; M25; Singles and Doubles Draws	(Australia) Dayne Kelly; 6–0, 6–0	(Indonesia) M Rifqi Fitriadi	(Japan) Yuta Shimizu (South Korea) Jang Yun-seok	(Turkey) Yankı Erel (Australia) Tristan Schoolkate (South Korea) Lee Duck-hee; Evgeny Donskoy
April 10	Jakarta, Indonesia; Hard; M25; Singles and Doubles Draws	(South Korea) Chung Yun-seong (South Korea) Jeong Yeong-seok; 4–6, 7–6^{(7–1)}, [10–8]	(Japan) Makoto Ochi (Japan) Yuta Shimizu	(Japan) Yuta Shimizu (South Korea) Jang Yun-seok	(Turkey) Yankı Erel (Australia) Tristan Schoolkate (South Korea) Lee Duck-hee; Evgeny Donskoy
April 10	Santa Margherita di Pula, Italy; Clay; M25; Singles and Doubles Draws	(Portugal) Gonçalo Oliveira; 6–3, 6–2	(Poland) Daniel Michalski	(Italy) Pietro Marino (Italy) Giorgio Tabacco	(United Kingdom) Kyle Edmund (Italy) Gianmarco Ferrari (Italy) Stefano Napolitano (Romania) Filip Cristian Jianu
April 10	Santa Margherita di Pula, Italy; Clay; M25; Singles and Doubles Draws	(France) Mathys Erhard; Mikalai Haliak; 6–3, 4–6, [10–4]	(Italy) Federico Cinà (Italy) Gianmarco Ferrari	(Italy) Pietro Marino (Italy) Giorgio Tabacco	(United Kingdom) Kyle Edmund (Italy) Gianmarco Ferrari (Italy) Stefano Napolitano (Romania) Filip Cristian Jianu
April 10	Telde, Spain; Clay; M15; Singles and Doubles Draws	(Lithuania) Vilius Gaubas; 7–6^{(7–4)}, 6–2	(Spain) Diego Augusto Barreto Sánchez	Yaroslav Demin (Spain) Jorge Martínez Martínez	(Ukraine) Georgii Kravchenko (Spain) Alberto Barroso Campos (Switzerland) Jérôme Kym (Poland) Marcel Zieliński
April 10	Telde, Spain; Clay; M15; Singles and Doubles Draws	(Switzerland) Noah Lopez (Bulgaria) Leonid Sheyngezikht; 7–5, 6–7^{(4–7)}, [10–8]	(Germany) Lewie Lane (Germany) Kai Lemstra	Yaroslav Demin (Spain) Jorge Martínez Martínez	(Ukraine) Georgii Kravchenko (Spain) Alberto Barroso Campos (Switzerland) Jérôme Kym (Poland) Marcel Zieliński
April 10	Santo Domingo de los Tsáchilas, Ecuador; Clay; M15; Singles and Doubles Draws	(Peru) Gonzalo Bueno; 6–4, 6–2	(Argentina) Ignacio Monzón	(Georgia (country)) Aleksandre Metreveli (Colombia) Alejandro Hoyos Franco	(Ecuador) Álvaro Guillén Meza (United States) Victor Lilov (Colombia) Juan Sebastián Gómez (Argentina) Tobías Franco
April 10	Santo Domingo de los Tsáchilas, Ecuador; Clay; M15; Singles and Doubles Draws	(Canada) Juan Carlos Aguilar (United States) Ezekiel Clark; 6–3, 7–5	(Brazil) Luís Britto (Brazil) Paulo André Saraiva dos Santos	(Georgia (country)) Aleksandre Metreveli (Colombia) Alejandro Hoyos Franco	(Ecuador) Álvaro Guillén Meza (United States) Victor Lilov (Colombia) Juan Sebastián Gómez (Argentina) Tobías Franco
April 10	Sunrise, United States; Clay; M15; Singles and Doubles Draws	(United States) Thai-Son Kwiatkowski; 6–4, 7–6^{(7–5)}	(United States) Tristan McCormick	(Austria) David Pichler (United States) Jaycer Lyeons	(Brazil) João Vítor Gonçalves Ceolin (United States) Kyle Kang (United States) Aidan Kim (United States) Sekou Bangoura
April 10	Sunrise, United States; Clay; M15; Singles and Doubles Draws	(United Kingdom) Blu Baker (United States) Sekou Bangoura; 6–2, 6–4	(United States) Jared Thompkins (United States) Leonardo Vega	(Austria) David Pichler (United States) Jaycer Lyeons	(Brazil) João Vítor Gonçalves Ceolin (United States) Kyle Kang (United States) Aidan Kim (United States) Sekou Bangoura
April 10	Antalya, Turkey; Clay; M15; Singles and Doubles Draws	(Bulgaria) Yanaki Milev; 6–4, 0–6, 6–4	(Sweden) Dragoș Nicolae Mădăraș	(Argentina) Juan Pablo Paz (Switzerland) Damien Wenger	(Argentina) Juan Manuel La Serna (Romania) Sebastian Gima (France) Maxime Chazal (Argentina) Lorenzo Joaquín Rodríguez
April 10	Antalya, Turkey; Clay; M15; Singles and Doubles Draws	(Ukraine) Viacheslav Bielinskyi (Switzerland) Damien Wenger; 2–6, 6–3, [10–1]	(Argentina) Luciano Emanuel Ambrogi (Argentina) Lorenzo Joaquín Rodríguez	(Argentina) Juan Pablo Paz (Switzerland) Damien Wenger	(Argentina) Juan Manuel La Serna (Romania) Sebastian Gima (France) Maxime Chazal (Argentina) Lorenzo Joaquín Rodríguez
April 10	Monastir, Tunisia; Hard; M15; Singles and Doubles Draws	(Portugal) Duarte Vale; 6–3, 3–0, ret.	(Australia) Li Tu	(Syria) Hazem Naw (Austria) Sebastian Sorger	(Turkey) Koray Kırcı (United States) Omni Kumar (Portugal) Daniel Rodrigues; Bogdan Bobrov
April 10	Monastir, Tunisia; Hard; M15; Singles and Doubles Draws	(Germany) Jakob Schnaitter (Germany) Mark Wallner; 6–3, 6–2	(Japan) Kokoro Isomura (Japan) Yamato Sueoka	(Syria) Hazem Naw (Austria) Sebastian Sorger	(Turkey) Koray Kırcı (United States) Omni Kumar (Portugal) Daniel Rodrigues; Bogdan Bobrov
April 17	Nottingham, United Kingdom; Hard; M25; Singles and Doubles Draws	(France) Jules Marie; 6-3, 6-3	(United Kingdom) Daniel Cox	(France) Clément Chidekh (United Kingdom) Daniel Little	(Australia) Matthew Dellavedova (France) Lucas Poullain (United Kingdom) Millen Hurrion (Sweden) Karl Friberg
April 17	Nottingham, United Kingdom; Hard; M25; Singles and Doubles Draws	(Austria) Neil Oberleitner (United Kingdom) Marcus Willis; 7–6^{(7–1)}, 6–3	(Denmark) August Holmgren (Denmark) Johannes Ingildsen	(France) Clément Chidekh (United Kingdom) Daniel Little	(Australia) Matthew Dellavedova (France) Lucas Poullain (United Kingdom) Millen Hurrion (Sweden) Karl Friberg
April 17	Sharm El Sheikh, Egypt; Hard; M25; Singles and Doubles Draws	(Italy) Samuel Vincent Ruggeri; 7–5, 3–6, 6–1	(South Africa) Kris van Wyk	(Moldova) Alexander Cozbinov (Egypt) Mohamed Safwat	(Egypt) Amr Elsayed (Uzbekistan) Sergey Fomin (South Africa) Alec Beckley (Luxembourg) Alex Knaff
April 17	Sharm El Sheikh, Egypt; Hard; M25; Singles and Doubles Draws	(France) Robin Bertrand (Australia) Calum Puttergill; 6–4, 6–1	(Egypt) Akram El Sallaly (Egypt) Mohamed Safwat	(Moldova) Alexander Cozbinov (Egypt) Mohamed Safwat	(Egypt) Amr Elsayed (Uzbekistan) Sergey Fomin (South Africa) Alec Beckley (Luxembourg) Alex Knaff
April 17	Jakarta, Indonesia; Hard; M25; Singles and Doubles Draws	(Sweden) Leo Borg; 6–4, 6–4	(South Korea) Lee Jea-moon	(Turkey) Yankı Erel (South Korea) Lee Duck-hee	(South Korea) Yeongseok Jeong (Thailand) Kasidit Samrej (Japan) Yuta Kawahashi (Australia) Tristan Schoolkate
April 17	Jakarta, Indonesia; Hard; M25; Singles and Doubles Draws	(Chinese Taipei) Ray Ho (China) Sun Fajing; 6–4, 7–5	(Philippines) Francis Alcantara (Thailand) Pruchya Isaro	(Turkey) Yankı Erel (South Korea) Lee Duck-hee	(South Korea) Yeongseok Jeong (Thailand) Kasidit Samrej (Japan) Yuta Kawahashi (Australia) Tristan Schoolkate
April 17	Angers, France; Clay (i); M25; Singles and Doubles Draws	(France) Clément Tabur; 6–4, 6–3	(France) Maxime Chazal	(Morocco) Elliot Benchetrit (France) Pierre Delage	(France) Ugo Blanchet (France) Lucas Bouquet (France) Lilian Marmousez (France) Maxime Mora
April 17	Angers, France; Clay (i); M25; Singles and Doubles Draws	(France) Sascha Gueymard Wayenburg (France) Grégoire Jacq; 4–6, 7–6^{(8–6)}, [10–5]	(France) Constantin Bittoun Kouzmine (Germany) Niklas Schell	(Morocco) Elliot Benchetrit (France) Pierre Delage	(France) Ugo Blanchet (France) Lucas Bouquet (France) Lilian Marmousez (France) Maxime Mora
April 17	Santa Margherita di Pula, Italy; Clay; M25; Singles and Doubles Draws	(Italy) Julian Ocleppo; 6–0, 6–3	(Italy) Tommaso Compagnucci	(France) Mathys Erhard (Italy) Alexander Weis	(Argentina) Alejo Lorenzo Lingua Lavallén (Italy) Lorenzo Rottoli (Portugal) Gonçalo Oliveira (Germany) Kai Wehnelt
April 17	Santa Margherita di Pula, Italy; Clay; M25; Singles and Doubles Draws	(Italy) Julian Ocleppo (Germany) Kai Wehnelt; 7–5, 6–2	(Italy) Patric Prinoth (Italy) Alexander Weis	(France) Mathys Erhard (Italy) Alexander Weis	(Argentina) Alejo Lorenzo Lingua Lavallén (Italy) Lorenzo Rottoli (Portugal) Gonçalo Oliveira (Germany) Kai Wehnelt
April 17	Split, Croatia; Clay; M25; Singles and Doubles Draws	(Croatia) Duje Ajduković; 6–3, 6–4	(Ukraine) Eric Vanshelboim	(Switzerland) Jérôme Kym (Poland) Maks Kaśnikowski	(Czech Republic) Michael Vrbenský (Ukraine) Oleg Prihodko (Bosnia and Herzegovina) Mirza Bašić (Hungary) Gergely Madarász
April 17	Split, Croatia; Clay; M25; Singles and Doubles Draws	(Poland) Piotr Matuszewski (Ukraine) Oleg Prihodko; 6–2, 7–6^{(8–6)}	(Poland) Maks Kaśnikowski (Switzerland) Jérôme Kym	(Switzerland) Jérôme Kym (Poland) Maks Kaśnikowski	(Czech Republic) Michael Vrbenský (Ukraine) Oleg Prihodko (Bosnia and Herzegovina) Mirza Bašić (Hungary) Gergely Madarász
April 17	Telde, Spain; Clay; M15; Singles and Doubles Draws	(Spain) Alejandro Manzanera Pertusa; 6–4, 7–6^{(7–5)}	(Poland) Marcel Zieliński	(Germany) Kai Lemstra (United States) Darwin Blanch	(Peru) Ignacio Buse (Uruguay) Martín Cuevas (Spain) Sergi Pérez Contri (Lithuania) Vilius Gaubas
April 17	Telde, Spain; Clay; M15; Singles and Doubles Draws	(Ukraine) Aleksandr Braynin (Ukraine) Georgii Kravchenko; 7–6^{(7–5)}, 6–7^{(3–7)}, [10–6]	(Spain) Alberto Barroso Campos (Spain) Sergi Pérez Contri	(Germany) Kai Lemstra (United States) Darwin Blanch	(Peru) Ignacio Buse (Uruguay) Martín Cuevas (Spain) Sergi Pérez Contri (Lithuania) Vilius Gaubas
April 17	Tacarigua, Trinidad and Tobago; Hard; M15; Singles and Doubles Draws	(United States) Ezekiel Clark; 3–6, 6–2, 7–5	(United States) Victor Lilov	(Australia) Edward Winter (France) Amaury Raynel	(United States) Tauheed Browning (Japan) Kosuke Ogura (France) Maxence Brovillé (United States) Yannik Rahman
April 17	Tacarigua, Trinidad and Tobago; Hard; M15; Singles and Doubles Draws	(United States) Ezekiel Clark (Republic of Ireland) Osgar O'Hoisin; 7–6^{(9–7)}, 6–4	(United States) AJ Catanzariti (United States) Joshua Sheehy	(Australia) Edward Winter (France) Amaury Raynel	(United States) Tauheed Browning (Japan) Kosuke Ogura (France) Maxence Brovillé (United States) Yannik Rahman
April 17	Antalya, Turkey; Clay; M15; Singles and Doubles Draws	(Sweden) Dragoș Nicolae Mădăraș; 3–2, ret.	(Ukraine) Viacheslav Bielinskyi	(Bulgaria) Simon Anthony Ivanov (Romania) Sebastian Gima	(Germany) Johannes Härteis (Germany) Marvin Möller (Germany) Peter Heller (Argentina) Mateo del Pino
April 17	Antalya, Turkey; Clay; M15; Singles and Doubles Draws	(Germany) Johannes Härteis (Germany) Peter Heller; 6–4, 7–6^{(9–7)}	(Argentina) Juan Pablo Paz (Argentina) Fermín Tenti	(Bulgaria) Simon Anthony Ivanov (Romania) Sebastian Gima	(Germany) Johannes Härteis (Germany) Marvin Möller (Germany) Peter Heller (Argentina) Mateo del Pino
April 17	Monastir, Tunisia; Hard; M15; Singles and Doubles Draws	(United States) Omni Kumar; 7–6^{(7–4)}, 2–6, 6–1	Bogdan Bobrov	(Ivory Coast) Eliakim Coulibaly (France) Adrien Gobat	(Syria) Hazem Naw (China) Mo Yecong (Italy) Andrea Guerrieri (France) Nicolas Tepmahc
April 17	Monastir, Tunisia; Hard; M15; Singles and Doubles Draws	(France) Maxence Beaugé (France) Arthur Bouquier; 6–2, 7–6^{(7–5)}	(Ghana) Abraham Asaba (Ivory Coast) Eliakim Coulibaly	(Ivory Coast) Eliakim Coulibaly (France) Adrien Gobat	(Syria) Hazem Naw (China) Mo Yecong (Italy) Andrea Guerrieri (France) Nicolas Tepmahc
April 24	Nottingham, United Kingdom; Hard; M25; Singles and Doubles Draws	(Denmark) August Holmgren; 7–6^{(7–5)}, 7–6^{(7–4)}	(France) Lucas Poullain	(United Kingdom) Daniel Little (United Kingdom) Giles Hussey	(Denmark) Christian Sigsgaard (United Kingdom) George Loffhagen (United Kingdom) Millen Hurrion (Netherlands) Alec Deckers
April 24	Nottingham, United Kingdom; Hard; M25; Singles and Doubles Draws	(United Kingdom) Daniel Little (United Kingdom) Mark Whitehouse; 6–4, 3–6, [12–10]	(Denmark) August Holmgren (United States) Alfredo Perez	(United Kingdom) Daniel Little (United Kingdom) Giles Hussey	(Denmark) Christian Sigsgaard (United Kingdom) George Loffhagen (United Kingdom) Millen Hurrion (Netherlands) Alec Deckers
April 24	Jakarta, Indonesia; Hard; M25; Singles and Doubles Draws	(Turkey) Yankı Erel; 6–3, 6–0	(Australia) Brandon Walkin	(Indonesia) M Rifqi Fitriadi (India) Digvijay Pratap Singh	(Japan) Makoto Ochi (Chinese Taipei) Huang Tsung-hao (China) Liu Hanyi (Australia) Jake Delaney
April 24	Jakarta, Indonesia; Hard; M25; Singles and Doubles Draws	(Australia) Matthew Romios (Australia) Brandon Walkin; 7–5, 6–4	(Chinese Taipei) Ray Ho (India) Parikshit Somani	(Indonesia) M Rifqi Fitriadi (India) Digvijay Pratap Singh	(Japan) Makoto Ochi (Chinese Taipei) Huang Tsung-hao (China) Liu Hanyi (Australia) Jake Delaney
April 24	Sanxenxo, Spain; Hard; M25; Singles and Doubles Draws	(China) Te Rigele; 7–6^{(7–5)}, 3–6, 7–6^{(7–3)}	(Latvia) Robert Strombachs	(Chile) Diego Fernández Flores (Spain) Carlos Sánchez Jover	(Colombia) Adrià Soriano Barrera (Germany) Johannes Härteis (Spain) John Echeverría (Spain) Daniel Mérida
April 24	Sanxenxo, Spain; Hard; M25; Singles and Doubles Draws	(United States) George Goldhoff (United States) Mac Kiger; 6–4, 4–6, [10–7]	(Spain) John Echeverría (Spain) Ricardo Villacorta	(Chile) Diego Fernández Flores (Spain) Carlos Sánchez Jover	(Colombia) Adrià Soriano Barrera (Germany) Johannes Härteis (Spain) John Echeverría (Spain) Daniel Mérida
April 24	Santha Margherita di Pula, Italy; Clay; M25; Singles and Doubles Draws	(Italy) Lorenzo Rottoli; 6–1, 6–2	(Italy) Giovanni Oradini	(Austria) Lukas Neumayer (Portugal) Jaime Faria	(Italy) Carlo Alberto Fossati; Andrey Chepelev (France) Mathys Erhard (Spain) Nikolás Sánchez Izquierdo
April 24	Santha Margherita di Pula, Italy; Clay; M25; Singles and Doubles Draws	(Netherlands) Mick Veldheer (Germany) Kai Wehnelt; 3–6, 6–1, [14–12]	(Portugal) Jaime Faria (Portugal) Henrique Rocha	(Austria) Lukas Neumayer (Portugal) Jaime Faria	(Italy) Carlo Alberto Fossati; Andrey Chepelev (France) Mathys Erhard (Spain) Nikolás Sánchez Izquierdo
April 24	Tbilisi, Georgia; Hard; M25; Singles and Doubles Draws	Alibek Kachmazov; 6–2, 6–1	Egor Agafonov	(Australia) Adam Walton (Ivory Coast) Eliakim Coulibaly	(Georgia (country)) Saba Purtseladze (Australia) Blake Ellis (France) Robin Bertrand; Evgeny Philippov
April 24	Tbilisi, Georgia; Hard; M25; Singles and Doubles Draws	Aliaksandr Liaonenka; Alexander Zgirovsky; 6–0, 3–6, [10–5]	Egor Agafonov; Alibek Kachmazov	(Australia) Adam Walton (Ivory Coast) Eliakim Coulibaly	(Georgia (country)) Saba Purtseladze (Australia) Blake Ellis (France) Robin Bertrand; Evgeny Philippov
April 24	Kuršumlijska Banja, Serbia; Clay; M15; Singles and Doubles Draws	(Poland) Maks Kaśnikowski; 6–4, 7–6^{(7–3)}	(Croatia) Duje Ajduković	(Croatia) Mili Poljičak; Denis Klok	(North Macedonia) Gorazd Srbljak (Austria) Matthias Ujvary (Slovenia) Miha Vetrih (Italy) Gabriele Maria Noce
April 24	Kuršumlijska Banja, Serbia; Clay; M15; Singles and Doubles Draws	(Serbia) Viktor Jović (Serbia) Kristijan Juhas; 6–4, 6–2	(Italy) Alessandro Bellifemine (Italy) Gabriele Maria Noce	(Croatia) Mili Poljičak; Denis Klok	(North Macedonia) Gorazd Srbljak (Austria) Matthias Ujvary (Slovenia) Miha Vetrih (Italy) Gabriele Maria Noce
April 24	Mogi das Cruzes, Brazil; Clay; M15; Singles and Doubles Draws	(Brazil) Orlando Luz; 2–6, 6–0, 6–2	(Uruguay) Franco Roncadelli	(Brazil) João Fonseca (Brazil) Nicolas Zanellato	(Brazil) João Victor Couto Loureiro (Brazil) Rafael Tosetto (Brazil) Bruno Fernandez (Bolivia) Juan Carlos Prado Ángelo
April 24	Mogi das Cruzes, Brazil; Clay; M15; Singles and Doubles Draws	(Brazil) Gabriel Roveri Sidney (Brazil) Fernando Yamacita; 6–2, 6–0	(Brazil) Ryan Augusto dos Santos (Brazil) Victor Tosetto	(Brazil) João Fonseca (Brazil) Nicolas Zanellato	(Brazil) João Victor Couto Loureiro (Brazil) Rafael Tosetto (Brazil) Bruno Fernandez (Bolivia) Juan Carlos Prado Ángelo
April 24	Tacarigua, Trinidad and Tobago; Hard; M15; Singles and Doubles Draws	(France) Maxence Brovillé; 7–5, 7–6^{(8–6)}	(United States) Ezekiel Clark	(United States) Tauheed Browning (France) Amaury Raynel	(United States) Miles Jones (Sweden) Arvid Nordquist (United States) Yannik Rahman (United States) Victor Lilov
April 24	Tacarigua, Trinidad and Tobago; Hard; M15; Singles and Doubles Draws	(New Zealand) Finn Reynolds (Australia) Edward Winter; 4–6, 7–6^{(7–4)}, [10–6]	(United States) Ezekiel Clark (Republic of Ireland) Osgar O'Hoisin	(United States) Tauheed Browning (France) Amaury Raynel	(United States) Miles Jones (Sweden) Arvid Nordquist (United States) Yannik Rahman (United States) Victor Lilov
April 24	Meerbusch, Germany; Clay; M15; Singles and Doubles Draws	(France) Arthur Reymond; 6–4, 3–6, 6–1	Marat Sharipov	(Germany) Louis Wessels (Netherlands) Deney Wassermann	(Germany) Liam Gavrielides (Germany) Marvin Möller (Belgium) Buvaysar Gadamauri (Germany) Philip Florig
April 24	Meerbusch, Germany; Clay; M15; Singles and Doubles Draws	(Belgium) Buvaysar Gadamauri (Germany) Christoph Negritu; 4–6, 7–6^{(8–6)}, [10–7]	(Germany) Lewie Lane (Germany) John Sperle	(Germany) Louis Wessels (Netherlands) Deney Wassermann	(Germany) Liam Gavrielides (Germany) Marvin Möller (Belgium) Buvaysar Gadamauri (Germany) Philip Florig
April 24	Alaminos-Larnaca, Cyprus; Clay; M15; Singles and Doubles Draws	(Netherlands) Guy den Ouden; 6–7^{(8–10)}, 6–2, 6–4	(Bulgaria) Simon Anthony Ivanov	(Uzbekistan) Sergey Fomin (Germany) Sebastian Prechtel	(Morocco) Adam Moundir (Denmark) Elmer Møller (Italy) Samuele Pieri (Austria) Jonas Trinker
April 24	Alaminos-Larnaca, Cyprus; Clay; M15; Singles and Doubles Draws	(Cyprus) Stylianos Christodoulou (Cyprus) Sergis Kyratzis; 6–0, 6–3	(Romania) Sebastian Gima (Greece) Alexandros Skorilas	(Uzbekistan) Sergey Fomin (Germany) Sebastian Prechtel	(Morocco) Adam Moundir (Denmark) Elmer Møller (Italy) Samuele Pieri (Austria) Jonas Trinker
April 24	Vero Beach, United States; Clay; M15; Singles and Doubles Draws	(Canada) Dan Martin; 7–5, 1–6, 7–5	(United States) Jaycer Lyeons	(Portugal) Duarte Vale (United States) Jacob Brumm	(Dominican Republic) Roberto Cid Subervi (United States) Nicholas Godsick (Germany) Benedikt Henning (Ecuador) Andrés Andrade
April 24	Vero Beach, United States; Clay; M15; Singles and Doubles Draws	(Italy) Lorenzo Claverie (Dominican Republic) Peter Bertran; 4–6, 7–6^{(7–3)}, [10–8]	(United States) Jake Bhangdia (United States) Thomas Brown	(Portugal) Duarte Vale (United States) Jacob Brumm	(Dominican Republic) Roberto Cid Subervi (United States) Nicholas Godsick (Germany) Benedikt Henning (Ecuador) Andrés Andrade
April 24	Antalya, Turkey; Clay; M15; Singles and Doubles Draws	(Argentina) Luciano Emanuel Ambrogi; 7–6^{(7–4)}, 6–3	(Sweden) Dragoș Nicolae Mădăraș	(Argentina) Lorenzo Joaquín Rodríguez (Argentina) Juan Manuel La Serna	(Slovakia) Peter Benjamín Privara (Turkey) Marsel İlhan (Italy) Luca Tomasetto (Estonia) Kristjan Tamm
April 24	Antalya, Turkey; Clay; M15; Singles and Doubles Draws	(Argentina) Luciano Emanuel Ambrogi (Argentina) Lorenzo Joaquín Rodríguez; 6–3, 5–7, [10–8]	(Turkey) Gökberk Sarıtaş (Turkey) Mert Naci Türker	(Argentina) Lorenzo Joaquín Rodríguez (Argentina) Juan Manuel La Serna	(Slovakia) Peter Benjamín Privara (Turkey) Marsel İlhan (Italy) Luca Tomasetto (Estonia) Kristjan Tamm
April 24	Monastir, Tunisia; Hard; M15; Singles and Doubles Draws	(Slovenia) Blaž Rola; 7–6^{(7–4)}, 6–2	(France) Adrien Gobat	(Italy) Andrea Guerrieri (United States) Omni Kumar	Bogdan Bobrov (France) Maxence Beaugé (Germany) Max Wiskandt (France) Nicolas Tepmahc
April 24	Monastir, Tunisia; Hard; M15; Singles and Doubles Draws	(Germany) Jakob Schnaitter (Switzerland) Yannik Steinegger; Walkover	Nikita Ianin (Tunisia) Aziz Ouakaa	(Italy) Andrea Guerrieri (United States) Omni Kumar	Bogdan Bobrov (France) Maxence Beaugé (Germany) Max Wiskandt (France) Nicolas Tepmahc

=== May ===
Week of	Tournament	Winner	Runners-up	Semifinalists	Quarterfinalists
May 1	Sabadell, Spain; Clay; M25; Singles and Doubles Draws	(France) Mathias Bourgue; 7–6^{(7–5)}, 6–4	(France) Maxime Chazal	(Monaco) Valentin Vacherot (Portugal) Henrique Rocha	(Spain) Martín Landaluce (France) Matteo Martineau (Spain) David Jordà Sanchis (United States) Gianni Ross
May 1	Sabadell, Spain; Clay; M25; Singles and Doubles Draws	(France) Sascha Gueymard Wayenburg (France) Grégoire Jacq; 6–4, 6–3	(Spain) Íñigo Cervantes (Spain) Oriol Roca Batalla	(Monaco) Valentin Vacherot (Portugal) Henrique Rocha	(Spain) Martín Landaluce (France) Matteo Martineau (Spain) David Jordà Sanchis (United States) Gianni Ross
May 1	Nottingham, United Kingdom; Hard; M25; Singles and Doubles Draws	(United Kingdom) George Loffhagen; 7–6^{(7–5)}, 6–2	(France) Jules Marie	(United Kingdom) Giles Hussey (Japan) Yusuke Takahashi	(Portugal) Gonçalo Oliveira (United Kingdom) Aidan McHugh (United Kingdom) Joshua Goodger (Estonia) Daniil Glinka
May 1	Nottingham, United Kingdom; Hard; M25; Singles and Doubles Draws	(United Kingdom) Scott Duncan (United Kingdom) Marcus Willis; 6–3, 6–2	(United Kingdom) Giles Hussey (United Kingdom) Ben Jones	(United Kingdom) Giles Hussey (Japan) Yusuke Takahashi	(Portugal) Gonçalo Oliveira (United Kingdom) Aidan McHugh (United Kingdom) Joshua Goodger (Estonia) Daniil Glinka
May 1	Santa Margherita di Pula, Italy; Clay; M25; Singles and Doubles Draws	(Poland) Daniel Michalski; 6–1, 6–2	(Germany) Sebastian Fanselow	(Italy) Tommaso Compagnucci (Austria) Lukas Neumayer	(Belgium) Michael Geerts (Italy) Giovanni Oradini (Italy) Federico Iannaccone; Mikalai Haliak
May 1	Santa Margherita di Pula, Italy; Clay; M25; Singles and Doubles Draws	(Poland) Piotr Matuszewski (Germany) Kai Wehnelt; 7–6^{(7–1)}, 7–6^{(8–6)}	Mikalai Haliak (Italy) Augusto Virgili	(Italy) Tommaso Compagnucci (Austria) Lukas Neumayer	(Belgium) Michael Geerts (Italy) Giovanni Oradini (Italy) Federico Iannaccone; Mikalai Haliak
May 1	Tbilisi, Georgia; Hard; M15; Singles and Doubles Draws	(Australia) Adam Walton; 6–1, 6–2	(Israel) Orel Kimhi	(Australia) Blake Ellis (Australia) Mitchell Harper	(Georgia (country)) Zura Tkemaladze; Kirill Kivattsev; Egor Agafonov; Evgeny Philippov
May 1	Tbilisi, Georgia; Hard; M15; Singles and Doubles Draws	Aliaksandr Liaonenka; Alexander Zgirovsky; 6–2, 6–2	(Turkey) Sarp Ağabigün (Kazakhstan) Grigoriy Lomakin	(Australia) Blake Ellis (Australia) Mitchell Harper	(Georgia (country)) Zura Tkemaladze; Kirill Kivattsev; Egor Agafonov; Evgeny Philippov
May 1	Kuršumlijska Banja, Serbia; Clay; M15; Singles and Doubles Draws	(Germany) Marko Topo; 6–3, 6–4	(Morocco) Elliot Benchetrit	Andrey Chepelev (France) Clément Tabur	(Poland) Maks Kaśnikowski (Ukraine) Nikita Mashtakov (Bulgaria) Adriano Dzhenev (Ukraine) Oleksandr Ovcharenko
May 1	Kuršumlijska Banja, Serbia; Clay; M15; Singles and Doubles Draws	(Argentina) Juan Pablo Paz (Ukraine) Oleksandr Ovcharenko; 7–6^{(7–5)}, 6–4	(Montenegro) Rrezart Cungu (Lebanon) Hady Habib	Andrey Chepelev (France) Clément Tabur	(Poland) Maks Kaśnikowski (Ukraine) Nikita Mashtakov (Bulgaria) Adriano Dzhenev (Ukraine) Oleksandr Ovcharenko
May 1	Osijek, Croatia; Clay; M15; Singles and Doubles Draws	(Austria) Neil Oberleitner; 6–4, 6–3	(Egypt) Mohamed Safwat	(Croatia) Luka Mikrut (Hungary) Gergely Madarász	(Croatia) Matej Dodig (Bosnia and Herzegovina) Aldin Šetkić (Austria) Michael Glöckler (Austria) Sebastian Sorger
May 1	Osijek, Croatia; Clay; M15; Singles and Doubles Draws	(Croatia) Zvonimir Babić (Croatia) Luka Mikrut; 3–6, 6–2, [10–7]	(Croatia) Nikola Bašić; Pavel Verbin	(Croatia) Luka Mikrut (Hungary) Gergely Madarász	(Croatia) Matej Dodig (Bosnia and Herzegovina) Aldin Šetkić (Austria) Michael Glöckler (Austria) Sebastian Sorger
May 1	Alaminos-Larnaca, Cyprus; Clay; M15; Singles and Doubles Draws	(Romania) Nicholas David Ionel; 6–3, 7–6^{(7–2)}	(Romania) Filip Cristian Jianu	(Hungary) Péter Fajta (Romania) Vlad Andrei Dancu	(Germany) Sebastian Prechtel (Romania) Dragoș Nicolae Cazacu (Romania) Sebastian Gima (Denmark) Elmer Møller
May 1	Alaminos-Larnaca, Cyprus; Clay; M15; Singles and Doubles Draws	(Germany) Niklas Schell (Germany) Paul Wörner; 6–4, 0–6, [10–8]	(Italy) Fabrizio Andaloro (Italy) Andrea Militi Ribaldi	(Hungary) Péter Fajta (Romania) Vlad Andrei Dancu	(Germany) Sebastian Prechtel (Romania) Dragoș Nicolae Cazacu (Romania) Sebastian Gima (Denmark) Elmer Møller
May 1	Orange Park, United States; Clay; M15; Singles and Doubles Draws	(Dominican Republic) Roberto Cid Subervi; 0–6, 6–3, 6–2	(Croatia) Matija Pecotić	(Argentina) Matías Franco Descotte (Portugal) Daniel Rodrigues	(Kazakhstan) Dmitry Popko (United States) Colin Markes (United States) Aidan Kim (United States) Govind Nanda
May 1	Orange Park, United States; Clay; M15; Singles and Doubles Draws	(United States) Vasil Kirkov (Canada) Roy Stepanov; 6–3, 7–5	(Italy) Elio José Ribeiro Lago (Venezuela) Ricardo Rodríguez-Pace	(Argentina) Matías Franco Descotte (Portugal) Daniel Rodrigues	(Kazakhstan) Dmitry Popko (United States) Colin Markes (United States) Aidan Kim (United States) Govind Nanda
May 1	Antalya, Turkey; Clay; M15; Singles and Doubles Draws	(Argentina) Luciano Emanuel Ambrogi; 6–2, 7–5	(Israel) Yshai Oliel	(France) Gabriel Debru (Switzerland) Mirko Martinez	(Argentina) Juan Manuel La Serna (Argentina) Sean Hess (Slovakia) Peter Benjamín Privara (Germany) Jeremy Jahn
May 1	Antalya, Turkey; Clay; M15; Singles and Doubles Draws	(Argentina) Mateo del Pino (Argentina) Juan Manuel La Serna; 6–2, 1–6, [11–9]	(Lithuania) Edas Butvilas (France) Gabriel Debru	(France) Gabriel Debru (Switzerland) Mirko Martinez	(Argentina) Juan Manuel La Serna (Argentina) Sean Hess (Slovakia) Peter Benjamín Privara (Germany) Jeremy Jahn
May 1	Monastir, Tunisia; Hard; M15; Singles and Doubles Draws	(Tunisia) Skander Mansouri; 6–3, 6–4	(United States) Omni Kumar	(United States) Gage Brymer; Bogdan Bobrov	(Poland) Paweł Ciaś (Japan) Ryuki Matsuda (Japan) Hikaru Shiraishi (Australia) Thomas Braithwaite
May 1	Monastir, Tunisia; Hard; M15; Singles and Doubles Draws	(Tunisia) Skander Mansouri (Germany) Jakob Schnaitter; 6–2, 6–0	(Japan) Kokoro Isomura (Japan) Yamato Sueoka	(United States) Gage Brymer; Bogdan Bobrov	(Poland) Paweł Ciaś (Japan) Ryuki Matsuda (Japan) Hikaru Shiraishi (Australia) Thomas Braithwaite
May 8	Värnamo, Sweden; Clay; M25; Singles and Doubles Draws	(Sweden) Dragoș Nicolae Mădăraș; 7–6^{(7–4)}, 6–1	(United States) Oliver Crawford	(Ukraine) Eric Vanshelboim (United Kingdom) Jay Clarke	(Monaco) Lucas Catarina (Italy) Andrea Gola (Belgium) Alexander Blockx (Denmark) Elmer Møller
May 8	Värnamo, Sweden; Clay; M25; Singles and Doubles Draws	(Sweden) Simon Freund (Ukraine) Eric Vanshelboim; 6–3, 6–3	(United Kingdom) Charles Broom (United Kingdom) Mark Whitehouse	(Ukraine) Eric Vanshelboim (United Kingdom) Jay Clarke	(Monaco) Lucas Catarina (Italy) Andrea Gola (Belgium) Alexander Blockx (Denmark) Elmer Møller
May 8	Valldoreix, Spain; Clay; M25; Singles and Doubles Draws	(Spain) Nikolás Sánchez Izquierdo; 6–2, 6–0	(Spain) Àlex Martí Pujolràs	Svyatoslav Gulin (France) Calvin Hemery	(Spain) Benjamín Winter López (France) Ugo Blanchet (France) Tristan Lamasine (Spain) Daniel Mérida
May 8	Valldoreix, Spain; Clay; M25; Singles and Doubles Draws	(Spain) Javier Barranco Cosano (Spain) Benjamín Winter López; 6–4, 6–2	(France) Calvin Hemery (France) Tristan Lamasine	Svyatoslav Gulin (France) Calvin Hemery	(Spain) Benjamín Winter López (France) Ugo Blanchet (France) Tristan Lamasine (Spain) Daniel Mérida
May 8	Kuršumlijska Banja, Serbia; Clay; M25; Singles and Doubles Draws	(France) Clément Tabur; 6–4, 3–6, 6–2	(North Macedonia) Kalin Ivanovski	(Italy) Samuel Vincent Ruggeri (Ukraine) Oleksandr Ovcharenko	(Estonia) Mark Lajal; Andrey Chepelev (Romania) Cezar Crețu (Lebanon) Hady Habib
May 8	Kuršumlijska Banja, Serbia; Clay; M25; Singles and Doubles Draws	(North Macedonia) Kalin Ivanovski (Ukraine) Oleksandr Ovcharenko; 3–6, 7–6^{(7–5)}, [10–5]	Andrey Chepelev; Mikalai Haliak	(Italy) Samuel Vincent Ruggeri (Ukraine) Oleksandr Ovcharenko	(Estonia) Mark Lajal; Andrey Chepelev (Romania) Cezar Crețu (Lebanon) Hady Habib
May 8	Doboj, Bosnia and Herzegovina; Clay; M15; Singles and Doubles Draws	(Turkey) Ergi Kırkın; 7–6^{(7–5)}, 7–5	(Austria) Sebastian Sorger	Marat Sharipov (Ukraine) Viacheslav Bielinskyi	(Serbia) Stefan Popović (Netherlands) Ryan Nijboer; Denis Klok (Switzerland) Mirko Martinez
May 8	Doboj, Bosnia and Herzegovina; Clay; M15; Singles and Doubles Draws	(Turkey) Ergi Kırkın (Netherlands) Ryan Nijboer; 7–5, 6–4	(Australia) Matt Hulme (Australia) Zaharije-Zak Talic	Marat Sharipov (Ukraine) Viacheslav Bielinskyi	(Serbia) Stefan Popović (Netherlands) Ryan Nijboer; Denis Klok (Switzerland) Mirko Martinez
May 8	Alaminos-Larnaca, Cyprus; Clay; M15; Singles and Doubles Draws	(Romania) Filip Cristian Jianu; 5–7, 6–3, 6–2	(Germany) Sebastian Prechtel	(Romania) Sebastian Gima (Italy) Fabrizio Andaloro	(Hungary) Péter Fajta (Germany) Niklas Schell (Cyprus) Sergis Kyratzis (Portugal) Gonçalo Oliveira
May 8	Alaminos-Larnaca, Cyprus; Clay; M15; Singles and Doubles Draws	(Germany) Niklas Schell (Germany) Paul Wörner; 7–5, 3–6, [10–7]	(Cyprus) Sergis Kyratzis (Cyprus) Eleftherios Neos	(Romania) Sebastian Gima (Italy) Fabrizio Andaloro	(Hungary) Péter Fajta (Germany) Niklas Schell (Cyprus) Sergis Kyratzis (Portugal) Gonçalo Oliveira
May 8	Antalya, Turkey; Clay; M15; Singles and Doubles Draws	(Netherlands) Sidané Pontjodikromo; 2–4, ret.	(Netherlands) Deney Wassermann	(Slovakia) Peter Benjamín Privara (France) Gabriel Debru	(Argentina) Fermín Tenti (Belgium) Simon Beaupain (Lithuania) Edas Butvilas (Spain) Max Alcalá Gurri
May 8	Antalya, Turkey; Clay; M15; Singles and Doubles Draws	(France) Gabriel Debru (Argentina) Juan Manuel La Serna; 7–6^{(7–4)}, 6–3	(Argentina) Sean Hess (Argentina) Fermín Tenti	(Slovakia) Peter Benjamín Privara (France) Gabriel Debru	(Argentina) Fermín Tenti (Belgium) Simon Beaupain (Lithuania) Edas Butvilas (Spain) Max Alcalá Gurri
May 8	Monastir, Tunisia; Hard; M15; Singles and Doubles Draws	(Ivory Coast) Eliakim Coulibaly; 6–2, 6–1	(China) Te Rigele	(Portugal) Tiago Pereira (China) Mo Yecong	(South Africa) Kris van Wyk (United States) Omni Kumar (Moldova) Ilya Snițari (Estonia) Daniil Glinka
May 8	Monastir, Tunisia; Hard; M15; Singles and Doubles Draws	(Japan) Ryuki Matsuda (Japan) Hikaru Shiraishi; 6–3, 6–4	(Japan) Kokoro Isomura (New Zealand) Jack Loutit	(Portugal) Tiago Pereira (China) Mo Yecong	(South Africa) Kris van Wyk (United States) Omni Kumar (Moldova) Ilya Snițari (Estonia) Daniil Glinka
May 15	Prague, Czech Republic; Clay; M25; Singles and Doubles Draws	(Austria) Lukas Neumayer; 6–2, 6–3	(Germany) Henri Squire	(Czech Republic) Patrik Rikl (Portugal) Gonçalo Oliveira	(Germany) Rudolf Molleker (Czech Republic) Maxim Mrva (Czech Republic) Michael Vrbenský (Czech Republic) Andrew Paulson
May 15	Prague, Czech Republic; Clay; M25; Singles and Doubles Draws	(United Kingdom) Stuart Parker (Switzerland) Jakub Paul; 3–6, 6–3, [10–6]	(United States) Martin Damm (United States) Alex Rybakov	(Czech Republic) Patrik Rikl (Portugal) Gonçalo Oliveira	(Germany) Rudolf Molleker (Czech Republic) Maxim Mrva (Czech Republic) Michael Vrbenský (Czech Republic) Andrew Paulson
May 15	Gurb, Spain; Clay; M25; Singles and Doubles Draws	(Spain) David Jordà Sanchis; 6–3, 6–1	(Israel) Daniel Cukierman	(France) Tristan Lamasine (France) Maxime Chazal	(United Kingdom) Felix Gill (Spain) Tomás Curras Abasolo (Peru) Gonzalo Bueno (Spain) Carlos Sánchez Jover
May 15	Gurb, Spain; Clay; M25; Singles and Doubles Draws	(Israel) Daniel Cukierman (Argentina) Mariano Kestelboim; 6–3, 6–3	(Greece) Dimitris Sakellaridis (Greece) Stefanos Sakellaridis	(France) Tristan Lamasine (France) Maxime Chazal	(United Kingdom) Felix Gill (Spain) Tomás Curras Abasolo (Peru) Gonzalo Bueno (Spain) Carlos Sánchez Jover
May 15	Xalapa, Mexico; Hard; M25; Singles and Doubles Draws	(Mexico) Ernesto Escobedo; 6–3, 6–4	(United States) Aidan Mayo	(United Kingdom) Aidan McHugh (United States) Evan Zhu	(Canada) Juan Carlos Aguilar (United States) Ezekiel Clark (Peru) Jorge Panta (Costa Rica) Jesse Flores
May 15	Xalapa, Mexico; Hard; M25; Singles and Doubles Draws	(Ecuador) Andrés Andrade (Argentina) Facundo Mena; 7–6^{(7–3)}, 6–3	(Canada) Juan Carlos Aguilar (Peru) Jorge Panta	(United Kingdom) Aidan McHugh (United States) Evan Zhu	(Canada) Juan Carlos Aguilar (United States) Ezekiel Clark (Peru) Jorge Panta (Costa Rica) Jesse Flores
May 15	Kuršumlijska Banja, Serbia; Clay; M25; Singles and Doubles Draws	(Germany) Marko Topo; 6–2, 6–1	(France) Mathys Erhard	Mikalai Haliak (Estonia) Mark Lajal	(Serbia) Milan Drinić (France) Timo Legout (Croatia) Mili Poljičak (United States) Oliver Crawford
May 15	Kuršumlijska Banja, Serbia; Clay; M25; Singles and Doubles Draws	(Netherlands) Guy den Ouden (Italy) Samuel Vincent Ruggeri; 7–5, 6–2	(Ukraine) Volodymyr Uzhylovskyi (Serbia) Miljan Zekić	Mikalai Haliak (Estonia) Mark Lajal	(Serbia) Milan Drinić (France) Timo Legout (Croatia) Mili Poljičak (United States) Oliver Crawford
May 15	Reggio Emilia, Italy; Clay; M25; Singles and Doubles Draws	(United Kingdom) Jay Clarke; 6–3, 6–4	(Italy) Julian Ocleppo	(United Kingdom) Kyle Edmund (Italy) Giorgio Tabacco	(France) Térence Atmane (Germany) Kai Wehnelt (Monaco) Valentin Vacherot (Italy) Giovanni Oradini
May 15	Reggio Emilia, Italy; Clay; M25; Singles and Doubles Draws	(Italy) Francesco Forti (Italy) Julian Ocleppo; 6–3, 6–7^{(2–7)}, [10–7]	(Poland) Piotr Matuszewski (Germany) Kai Wehnelt	(United Kingdom) Kyle Edmund (Italy) Giorgio Tabacco	(France) Térence Atmane (Germany) Kai Wehnelt (Monaco) Valentin Vacherot (Italy) Giovanni Oradini
May 15	Pensacola, United States; Clay; M25; Singles and Doubles Draws	(Kazakhstan) Dmitry Popko; 6–1, 6–4	(United States) Aidan Kim	(Dominican Republic) Roberto Cid Subervi (United States) Sekou Bangoura	(Italy) Lorenzo Claverie (United Kingdom) Blu Baker (Australia) Bernard Tomic (United States) Nathan Ponwith
May 15	Pensacola, United States; Clay; M25; Singles and Doubles Draws	(United States) Vasil Kirkov (Canada) Benjamin Sigouin; 6–3, 4–6, [10–8]	(United States) Sekou Bangoura (Canada) Roy Stepanov	(Dominican Republic) Roberto Cid Subervi (United States) Sekou Bangoura	(Italy) Lorenzo Claverie (United Kingdom) Blu Baker (Australia) Bernard Tomic (United States) Nathan Ponwith
May 15	Prijedor, Bosnia and Herzegovina; Clay; M15; Singles and Doubles Draws	(Bosnia and Herzegovina) Andrej Nedić; 6–4, 2–6, 6–1	(Ukraine) Viacheslav Bielinskyi	(Serbia) Stefan Popović (Serbia) Dušan Obradović	(Turkey) Ergi Kırkın (Czech Republic) Petr Brunclík (Brazil) Nicolas Zanellato (France) Amaury Raynel
May 15	Prijedor, Bosnia and Herzegovina; Clay; M15; Singles and Doubles Draws	(Slovakia) Miloš Karol (Morocco) Adam Moundir; 6–3, 7–5	(Czech Republic) Petr Brunclík; Vitali Shvets	(Serbia) Stefan Popović (Serbia) Dušan Obradović	(Turkey) Ergi Kırkın (Czech Republic) Petr Brunclík (Brazil) Nicolas Zanellato (France) Amaury Raynel
May 15	Addis Ababa, Ethiopia; Clay; M15; Singles and Doubles Draws	(Zimbabwe) Benjamin Lock; 7–5, 6–2	(Ukraine) Eric Vanshelboim	(South Africa) Alec Beckley (Italy) Denis Constantin Spiridon	(Spain) Mario González Fernández (India) Digvijay Pratap Singh (Burundi) Guy Orly Iradukunda (India) S D Prajwal Dev
May 15	Addis Ababa, Ethiopia; Clay; M15; Singles and Doubles Draws	(Egypt) Akram El Sallaly (South Africa) Kris van Wyk; 4–6, 6–3, [12–10]	(India) S D Prajwal Dev (India) Nitin Kumar Sinha	(South Africa) Alec Beckley (Italy) Denis Constantin Spiridon	(Spain) Mario González Fernández (India) Digvijay Pratap Singh (Burundi) Guy Orly Iradukunda (India) S D Prajwal Dev
May 15	Pazardzhik, Bulgaria; Clay; M15; Singles and Doubles Draws	(Bulgaria) Iliyan Radulov; 6–4, 6–1	(Italy) Simone Roncalli	Denis Klok (Bulgaria) Simon Anthony Ivanov	(Bulgaria) Gabriel Donev (Luxembourg) Alex Knaff (Italy) Marco Miceli (Ukraine) Oleg Prihodko
May 15	Pazardzhik, Bulgaria; Clay; M15; Singles and Doubles Draws	Denis Klok (Ukraine) Oleg Prihodko; 7–6^{(7–4)}, 6–3	(Italy) Leonardo Rossi (Italy) Luigi Sorrentino	Denis Klok (Bulgaria) Simon Anthony Ivanov	(Bulgaria) Gabriel Donev (Luxembourg) Alex Knaff (Italy) Marco Miceli (Ukraine) Oleg Prihodko
May 15	Krško, Slovenia; Clay; M15; Singles and Doubles Draws	(Germany) Lucas Gerch; 6–4, 6–1	(Bosnia and Herzegovina) Mirza Bašić	(Slovakia) Lukáš Pokorný (France) Lucas Poullain	(Estonia) Oliver Ojakäär (Argentina) Ignacio Monzón (Poland) Paweł Ciaś (Slovenia) Bor Artnak
May 15	Krško, Slovenia; Clay; M15; Singles and Doubles Draws	(Ecuador) Álvaro Guillén Meza (Argentina) Ignacio Monzón; 3–6, 7–6^{(7–4)}, [10–4]	(Slovakia) Tomáš Lánik (Slovakia) Lukáš Pokorný	(Slovakia) Lukáš Pokorný (France) Lucas Poullain	(Estonia) Oliver Ojakäär (Argentina) Ignacio Monzón (Poland) Paweł Ciaś (Slovenia) Bor Artnak
May 15	Kalmar, Sweden; Clay; M15; Singles and Doubles Draws	(Monaco) Lucas Catarina; 6–1, 3–6, 7–6^{(14–12)}	(Sweden) Max Dahlin	(Belgium) Alexander Blockx (Netherlands) Niels Visker	(Sweden) Jonathan Mridha (Sweden) Filip Bergevi (Sweden) Oskar Jansson (Germany) Lewie Lane
May 15	Kalmar, Sweden; Clay; M15; Singles and Doubles Draws	(United States) George Goldhoff (United States) Mac Kiger; 2–6, 7–6^{(7–4)}, [10–6]	(Netherlands) Stijn Pel (Netherlands) Niels Visker	(Belgium) Alexander Blockx (Netherlands) Niels Visker	(Sweden) Jonathan Mridha (Sweden) Filip Bergevi (Sweden) Oskar Jansson (Germany) Lewie Lane
May 15	Antalya, Turkey; Clay; M15; Singles and Doubles Draws	(Sweden) Dragoș Nicolae Mădăraș; 7–5, 6–1	(Argentina) Lorenzo Joaquín Rodríguez	(Argentina) Juan Manuel La Serna (Italy) Gabriele Pennaforti	(Spain) Jaime Caldes (France) Corentin Denolly (Bulgaria) Alexander Donski (Spain) Max Alcalá Gurri
May 15	Antalya, Turkey; Clay; M15; Singles and Doubles Draws	Anton Chekhov; Ivan Nedelko; 4–6, 6–4, [10–8]	Egor Agafonov (Bulgaria) Alexander Donski	(Argentina) Juan Manuel La Serna (Italy) Gabriele Pennaforti	(Spain) Jaime Caldes (France) Corentin Denolly (Bulgaria) Alexander Donski (Spain) Max Alcalá Gurri
May 15	Monastir, Tunisia; Hard; M15; Singles and Doubles Draws	(Tunisia) Skander Mansouri; 6–4, 6–3	(Morocco) Yassine Dlimi	(France) Robin Bertrand (France) Alexis Gautier	(France) Adrien Gobat (France) Jaimee Floyd Angele (China) Mu Tao (United States) Omni Kumar
May 15	Monastir, Tunisia; Hard; M15; Singles and Doubles Draws	(United Kingdom) Millen Hurrion (United Kingdom) Giles Hussey; 6–4, 6–4	(France) Adrien Gobat (France) Alexandre Reco	(France) Robin Bertrand (France) Alexis Gautier	(France) Adrien Gobat (France) Jaimee Floyd Angele (China) Mu Tao (United States) Omni Kumar
May 22	Bodrum, Turkey; Clay; M25; Singles and Doubles Draws	(Germany) Rudolf Molleker; 6–1, 7–6^{(7–4)}	(United Kingdom) George Loffhagen	(Monaco) Valentin Vacherot (Spain) Carlos Sánchez Jover	(Brazil) Pedro Sakamoto (Netherlands) Guy den Ouden (Uzbekistan) Sergey Fomin (Ukraine) Vladyslav Orlov
May 22	Bodrum, Turkey; Clay; M25; Singles and Doubles Draws	(Uzbekistan) Sergey Fomin; Evgeny Philippov; 6–4, 7–6^{(7–5)}	Egor Agafonov (France) Lilian Marmousez	(Monaco) Valentin Vacherot (Spain) Carlos Sánchez Jover	(Brazil) Pedro Sakamoto (Netherlands) Guy den Ouden (Uzbekistan) Sergey Fomin (Ukraine) Vladyslav Orlov
May 22	Mataró, Spain; Clay; M25; Singles and Doubles Draws	(Spain) Nikolás Sánchez Izquierdo; 6–1, 6–4	(Greece) Stefanos Sakellaridis	(Spain) Diego Augusto Barreto Sánchez (United States) Kyle Kang	(United States) Dali Blanch (Peru) Ignacio Buse (Hong Kong) Coleman Wong (Paraguay) Daniel Vallejo
May 22	Mataró, Spain; Clay; M25; Singles and Doubles Draws	(Switzerland) Rémy Bertola (Italy) Gianmarco Ferrari; 7–6^{(7–4)}, 2–6, [11–9]	(Portugal) Henrique Rocha (Portugal) Jaime Faria	(Spain) Diego Augusto Barreto Sánchez (United States) Kyle Kang	(United States) Dali Blanch (Peru) Ignacio Buse (Hong Kong) Coleman Wong (Paraguay) Daniel Vallejo
May 22	Most, Czech Republic; Clay; M25; Singles and Doubles Draws	(Germany) Henri Squire; 6–1, 3–6, 6–0	(Germany) Timo Stodder	(Czech Republic) Michael Vrbenský (France) Émilien Voisin	(Germany) Mats Moraing (Switzerland) Jakub Paul (Czech Republic) Daniel Pátý (United States) Martin Damm
May 22	Most, Czech Republic; Clay; M25; Singles and Doubles Draws	(United Kingdom) Stuart Parker (Switzerland) Jakub Paul; 6–3, 6–2	(Czech Republic) Ondřej Horák (Czech Republic) Daniel Siniakov	(Czech Republic) Michael Vrbenský (France) Émilien Voisin	(Germany) Mats Moraing (Switzerland) Jakub Paul (Czech Republic) Daniel Pátý (United States) Martin Damm
May 22	Kuršumlijska Banja, Serbia; Clay; M15; Singles and Doubles Draws	(Hungary) Péter Fajta; 7–6^{(7–5)}, 6–2	(Italy) Andrea Picchione	(Poland) Martyn Pawelski (Poland) Paweł Ciaś	(Italy) Samuel Vincent Ruggeri (Colombia) Johan Alexander Rodríguez Rodríguez (Australia) Matthew Dellavedova; Evgenii Tiurnev
May 22	Kuršumlijska Banja, Serbia; Clay; M15; Singles and Doubles Draws	Evgenii Tiurnev; Semen Voronin; 6–2, 5–7, [10–8]	(Italy) Andrea Picchione (Ukraine) Volodymyr Uzhylovskyi	(Poland) Martyn Pawelski (Poland) Paweł Ciaś	(Italy) Samuel Vincent Ruggeri (Colombia) Johan Alexander Rodríguez Rodríguez (Australia) Matthew Dellavedova; Evgenii Tiurnev
May 22	Brčko, Bosnia and Herzegovina; Clay; M15; Singles and Doubles Draws	(Bosnia and Herzegovina) Andrej Nedić; 6–4, 6–4	(Serbia) Stefan Popović	Kirill Kivattsev (Serbia) Aleksa Mardjonovic	(Egypt) Mohamed Safwat (Bosnia and Herzegovina) Radomir Tomić (Slovakia) Peter Benjamín Privara (Ukraine) Viacheslav Bielinskyi
May 22	Brčko, Bosnia and Herzegovina; Clay; M15; Singles and Doubles Draws	(United States) George Goldhoff (Australia) Brandon Walkin; 7–6^{(7–4)}, 6–3	(Austria) David Pichler (Slovakia) Lukáš Pokorný	Kirill Kivattsev (Serbia) Aleksa Mardjonovic	(Egypt) Mohamed Safwat (Bosnia and Herzegovina) Radomir Tomić (Slovakia) Peter Benjamín Privara (Ukraine) Viacheslav Bielinskyi
May 22	Warmbad Villach, Austria; Clay; M15; Singles and Doubles Draws	(Argentina) Alex Barrena; 2–6, 6–4, 6–3	(Germany) Tim Handel	(Italy) Tommaso Compagnucci (Germany) Luca Wiedenmann	(Germany) Philip Florig (Uzbekistan) Khumoyun Sultanov (Germany) Max Hans Rehberg (Italy) Giovanni Oradini
May 22	Warmbad Villach, Austria; Clay; M15; Singles and Doubles Draws	(Austria) Sandro Kopp (Germany) Kai Lemstra; 6–3, 6–4	(Peru) Alexander Merino (Germany) Christoph Negritu	(Italy) Tommaso Compagnucci (Germany) Luca Wiedenmann	(Germany) Philip Florig (Uzbekistan) Khumoyun Sultanov (Germany) Max Hans Rehberg (Italy) Giovanni Oradini
May 22	Addis Ababa, Ethiopia; Clay; M15; Singles and Doubles Draws	(Zimbabwe) Benjamin Lock; 6–2, 6–2	(India) Rishab Agarwal	(India) S D Prajwal Dev (Ukraine) Eric Vanshelboim	(Iran) Sina Moghimi (India) Nitin Kumar Sinha (India) Digvijay Pratap Singh (India) Karan Singh
May 22	Addis Ababa, Ethiopia; Clay; M15; Singles and Doubles Draws	(India) S D Prajwal Dev (India) Nitin Kumar Sinha; 6–3, 6–0	(South Africa) Alec Beckley (South Africa) Kris van Wyk	(India) S D Prajwal Dev (Ukraine) Eric Vanshelboim	(Iran) Sina Moghimi (India) Nitin Kumar Sinha (India) Digvijay Pratap Singh (India) Karan Singh
May 22	Bucharest, Romania; Clay; M15; Singles and Doubles Draws	(Romania) Cezar Crețu; 6–4, 6–2	(Israel) Yshai Oliel	(Bulgaria) Petr Nesterov (France) Florent Bax	(Italy) Andrea Guerrieri (Netherlands) Ryan Nijboer (Argentina) Juan Pablo Paz (Romania) Dan Alexandru Tomescu
May 22	Bucharest, Romania; Clay; M15; Singles and Doubles Draws	(Belgium) Simon Beaupain (Argentina) Juan Pablo Paz; 6–4, 6–2	(Israel) Lior Goldenberg (Israel) Yshai Oliel	(Bulgaria) Petr Nesterov (France) Florent Bax	(Italy) Andrea Guerrieri (Netherlands) Ryan Nijboer (Argentina) Juan Pablo Paz (Romania) Dan Alexandru Tomescu
May 22	Tabasco, Mexico; Hard (i); M15; Singles and Doubles Draws	(United States) Ezekiel Clark; 2–6, 6–2, 6–4	(United States) Aidan Mayo	(United States) Joshua Sheehy (United States) Victor Lilov	(Argentina) Facundo Mena (Ecuador) Andrés Andrade (Mexico) Ernesto Escobedo (United Kingdom) Aidan McHugh
May 22	Tabasco, Mexico; Hard (i); M15; Singles and Doubles Draws	(Canada) Juan Carlos Aguilar (Peru) Jorge Panta; 6–3, 6–7^{(4–7)}, [10–7]	(Costa Rica) Jesse Flores (United States) Joshua Sheehy	(United States) Joshua Sheehy (United States) Victor Lilov	(Argentina) Facundo Mena (Ecuador) Andrés Andrade (Mexico) Ernesto Escobedo (United Kingdom) Aidan McHugh
May 22	Huntsville, United States; Clay; M15; Singles and Doubles Draws	(China) Fnu Nidunjianzan; 7–5, 6–3	(Dominican Republic) Roberto Cid Subervi	(Portugal) Duarte Vale (Jamaica) Blaise Bicknell	(United States) Jacob Brumm (United States) Sekou Bangoura (United Kingdom) Blu Baker (United States) Tristan McCormick
May 22	Huntsville, United States; Clay; M15; Singles and Doubles Draws	(Brazil) Lorenzo Esquici (Argentina) Franco Ribero; 6–4, 6–3	(United States) Elijah Strode (United States) Isaiah Strode	(Portugal) Duarte Vale (Jamaica) Blaise Bicknell	(United States) Jacob Brumm (United States) Sekou Bangoura (United Kingdom) Blu Baker (United States) Tristan McCormick
May 22	Pazardzhik, Bulgaria; Clay; M15; Singles and Doubles Draws	(Hungary) Mátyás Füle; 6–4, 7–6^{(7–5)}	(Italy) Riccardo Balzerani	(France) Corentin Denolly (Italy) Leonardo Rossi	(Romania) Sebastian Gima (Bulgaria) Simon Anthony Ivanov (Italy) Simone Roncalli (Luxembourg) Alex Knaff
May 22	Pazardzhik, Bulgaria; Clay; M15; Singles and Doubles Draws	(France) Corentin Denolly (Luxembourg) Alex Knaff; 6–0, 6–0	(Italy) Riccardo Balzerani; Artsiom Sinitsyn	(France) Corentin Denolly (Italy) Leonardo Rossi	(Romania) Sebastian Gima (Bulgaria) Simon Anthony Ivanov (Italy) Simone Roncalli (Luxembourg) Alex Knaff
May 22	Monastir, Tunisia; Hard; M15; Singles and Doubles Draws	(Lebanon) Hady Habib; 6–2, 6–4	(France) Adrien Gobat	(Estonia) Daniil Glinka (Colombia) Adrià Soriano Barrera	(France) Robin Bertrand (France) Nicolas Jadoun (France) Alexis Gautier (China) Te Rigele
May 22	Monastir, Tunisia; Hard; M15; Singles and Doubles Draws	(Japan) Ryuki Matsuda (China) Mu Tao; 6–4, 6–1	(France) Robin Bertrand (Spain) Aaron Gil García	(Estonia) Daniil Glinka (Colombia) Adrià Soriano Barrera	(France) Robin Bertrand (France) Nicolas Jadoun (France) Alexis Gautier (China) Te Rigele
May 29	Carnac, France; Clay; M25; Singles and Doubles Draws	(France) Lucas Poullain; 4–6, 6–2, 6–2	(France) Antoine Hoang	(France) Mathias Bourgue (France) Clément Tabur	(France) Titouan Droguet (France) Timo Legout (France) Mathys Erhard (France) Matteo Martineau
May 29	Carnac, France; Clay; M25; Singles and Doubles Draws	(France) Maxence Brovillé (Argentina) Federico Agustín Gómez; 7–6^{(7–5)}, 6–2	(France) Matteo Martineau (France) Clément Tabur	(France) Mathias Bourgue (France) Clément Tabur	(France) Titouan Droguet (France) Timo Legout (France) Mathys Erhard (France) Matteo Martineau
May 29	La Nucia, Spain; Clay; M25; Singles and Doubles Draws	Alibek Kachmazov; 6–3, 6–1	(Spain) Carlos Sánchez Jover	(Italy) Facundo Juárez (Spain) Daniel Mérida	(France) Valentin Royer (Israel) Yshai Oliel; Svyatoslav Gulin (Chile) Gonzalo Lama
May 29	La Nucia, Spain; Clay; M25; Singles and Doubles Draws	(Egypt) Amr Elsayed (China) Sun Fajing; 6–2, 6–3	(Greece) Dimitris Sakellaridis (Greece) Stefanos Sakellaridis	(Italy) Facundo Juárez (Spain) Daniel Mérida	(France) Valentin Royer (Israel) Yshai Oliel; Svyatoslav Gulin (Chile) Gonzalo Lama
May 29	Jablonec nad Nisou, Czech Republic; Clay; M25; Singles and Doubles Draws	(Austria) Lukas Neumayer; 6–2, 3–6, 6–1	(Germany) Tim Handel	(Czech Republic) Andrew Paulson (Germany) Sebastian Fanselow	(Bolivia) Murkel Dellien (United Kingdom) Stuart Parker (Uzbekistan) Khumoyun Sultanov (United States) Martin Damm
May 29	Jablonec nad Nisou, Czech Republic; Clay; M25; Singles and Doubles Draws	(Germany) Sebastian Fanselow (Czech Republic) Dominik Kellovský; 6–2, 6–4	(Bolivia) Murkel Dellien (Brazil) Pedro Sakamoto	(Czech Republic) Andrew Paulson (Germany) Sebastian Fanselow	(Bolivia) Murkel Dellien (United Kingdom) Stuart Parker (Uzbekistan) Khumoyun Sultanov (United States) Martin Damm
May 29	Jakarta, Indonesia; Hard; M25; Singles and Doubles Draws	(Chinese Taipei) Jason Jung; 6–2, 6–2	(Czech Republic) Dominik Palán	(Japan) Hiroki Moriya (Indonesia) Justin Barki	(Indonesia) Muhammad Rifqi Fitriadi (Japan) Yusuke Takahashi (Turkey) Yankı Erel (Japan) Kokoro Isomura
May 29	Jakarta, Indonesia; Hard; M25; Singles and Doubles Draws	(Philippines) Francis Alcantara (Japan) Hiroki Moriya; 6–2, 6–1	(Indonesia) Nathan Anthony Barki (Indonesia) Christopher Rungkat	(Japan) Hiroki Moriya (Indonesia) Justin Barki	(Indonesia) Muhammad Rifqi Fitriadi (Japan) Yusuke Takahashi (Turkey) Yankı Erel (Japan) Kokoro Isomura
May 29	Kiseljak, Bosnia and Herzegovina; Clay; M25; Singles and Doubles Draws	(Croatia) Duje Ajduković; 6–2, 7–5	(Brazil) Pedro Boscardin Dias	(Kazakhstan) Dmitry Popko; Kirill Kivattsev	(Argentina) Gonzalo Villanueva (Argentina) Juan Bautista Otegui; Bogdan Bobrov (Switzerland) Jérôme Kym
May 29	Kiseljak, Bosnia and Herzegovina; Clay; M25; Singles and Doubles Draws	(Australia) Matthew Romios (Australia) Brandon Walkin; 6–2, 6–3	(Serbia) Stefan Latinović (Serbia) Andrej Radojičić	(Kazakhstan) Dmitry Popko; Kirill Kivattsev	(Argentina) Gonzalo Villanueva (Argentina) Juan Bautista Otegui; Bogdan Bobrov (Switzerland) Jérôme Kym
May 29	Rome, Italy; Clay; M25; Singles and Doubles Draws	(Portugal) Gonçalo Oliveira; 6–2, 6–1	(Italy) Luca Potenza	(Argentina) Alex Barrena (Switzerland) Rémy Bertola	(United States) Oliver Crawford (Italy) Federico Iannaccone; Andrey Chepelev (Italy) Stefano Napolitano
May 29	Rome, Italy; Clay; M25; Singles and Doubles Draws	(Denmark) August Holmgren (Austria) David Pichler; 6–4, 7–5	(Israel) Edan Leshem (Italy) Julian Ocleppo	(Argentina) Alex Barrena (Switzerland) Rémy Bertola	(United States) Oliver Crawford (Italy) Federico Iannaccone; Andrey Chepelev (Italy) Stefano Napolitano
May 29	Constanța, Romania; Clay; M15; Singles and Doubles Draws	(Denmark) Elmer Møller; 3–6, 6–0, 6–1	(France) Florent Bax	(Romania) Radu Mihai Papoe (Romania) Sebastian Gima	(Romania) Cezar Crețu (Bulgaria) Simon Anthony Ivanov (Bulgaria) Petr Nesterov (Italy) Antonio Caruso
May 29	Constanța, Romania; Clay; M15; Singles and Doubles Draws	(Uruguay) Ignacio Carou (Brazil) João Victor Couto Loureiro; 6–3, 7–6^{(7–5)}	(Bulgaria) Petr Nesterov (Poland) Olaf Pieczkowski	(Romania) Radu Mihai Papoe (Romania) Sebastian Gima	(Romania) Cezar Crețu (Bulgaria) Simon Anthony Ivanov (Bulgaria) Petr Nesterov (Italy) Antonio Caruso
May 29	Nakhon Si Thammarat, Thailand; Hard; M15; Singles and Doubles Draws	(Israel) Orel Kimhi; 6–4, 7–5	(Australia) Philip Sekulic	(Australia) Chase Ferguson (India) Siddharth Vishwakarma	(Australia) Blake Ellis (Japan) Ryotaro Taguchi (Australia) Jacob Bradshaw (India) Nitin Kumar Sinha
May 29	Nakhon Si Thammarat, Thailand; Hard; M15; Singles and Doubles Draws	(Thailand) Yuttana Charoenphon (Thailand) Kasidit Samrej; 6–7^{(10–12)}, 7–6^{(7–1)}, [10–5]	(Japan) Shinji Hazawa (Japan) Ryotaro Taguchi	(Australia) Chase Ferguson (India) Siddharth Vishwakarma	(Australia) Blake Ellis (Japan) Ryotaro Taguchi (Australia) Jacob Bradshaw (India) Nitin Kumar Sinha
May 29	Kuršumlijska Banja, Serbia; Clay; M15; Singles and Doubles Draws	(Poland) Martyn Pawelski; 6–4, 6–1	(France) Luka Pavlovic	(Ecuador) Álvaro Guillén Meza (Hungary) Péter Fajta	(Serbia) Milan Drinić (Serbia) Kristijan Juhas (Argentina) Lautaro Midón (Argentina) Leonardo Aboian
May 29	Kuršumlijska Banja, Serbia; Clay; M15; Singles and Doubles Draws	(Italy) Lorenzo Carboni (Ukraine) Volodymyr Uzhylovskyi; 6–4, 5–7, [10–5]	Aliaksandr Liaonenka; Alexander Zgirovsky	(Ecuador) Álvaro Guillén Meza (Hungary) Péter Fajta	(Serbia) Milan Drinić (Serbia) Kristijan Juhas (Argentina) Lautaro Midón (Argentina) Leonardo Aboian
May 29	Karuizawa, Japan; Clay; M15; Singles and Doubles Draws	(Japan) Yuta Kawahashi; 7–5, 6–2	(Japan) Tatsuma Ito	(South Korea) Shin San-hui (Japan) Sora Fukuda	(Japan) Jumpei Yamasaki (Japan) Hikaru Shiraishi (Japan) Yuichiro Inui (Japan) Kazuma Kawachi
May 29	Karuizawa, Japan; Clay; M15; Singles and Doubles Draws	(Japan) Sora Fukuda (Japan) Seita Watanabe; 7–5, 7–6^{(7–5)}	(South Korea) Han Seong-yong (South Korea) Shin San-hui	(South Korea) Shin San-hui (Japan) Sora Fukuda	(Japan) Jumpei Yamasaki (Japan) Hikaru Shiraishi (Japan) Yuichiro Inui (Japan) Kazuma Kawachi
May 29	Rancho Santa Fe, United States; Hard; M15; Singles and Doubles Draws	(Northern Mariana Islands) Colin Sinclair; 6–3, 6–2	(France) Jaimee Floyd Angele	(United States) Noah Schachter (United States) Keegan Smith	(France) Robin Catry (Canada) Juan Carlos Aguilar (United States) Jack Anthrop (United States) Braden Shick
May 29	Rancho Santa Fe, United States; Hard; M15; Singles and Doubles Draws	(United States) Jack Anthrop (United States) Bryce Nakashima; 6–1, 6–4	(United Kingdom) Aidan McHugh (United States) Keegan Smith	(United States) Noah Schachter (United States) Keegan Smith	(France) Robin Catry (Canada) Juan Carlos Aguilar (United States) Jack Anthrop (United States) Braden Shick
May 29	Monastir, Tunisia; Hard; M15; Singles and Doubles Draws	(Moldova) Alexander Cozbinov; 6–1, 6–4	(France) Adrien Gobat	(Ivory Coast) Eliakim Coulibaly (France) Raphaël Lambling	(China) Mu Tao (France) François Musitelli (France) Alexis Gautier (Germany) Max Wiskandt
May 29	Monastir, Tunisia; Hard; M15; Singles and Doubles Draws	(France) François Musitelli (France) Nicolas Tourte; 2–6, 6–3, [10–4]	(United Kingdom) Billy Blaydes (United Kingdom) Freddy Blaydes	(Ivory Coast) Eliakim Coulibaly (France) Raphaël Lambling	(China) Mu Tao (France) François Musitelli (France) Alexis Gautier (Germany) Max Wiskandt

=== June ===
Week of	Tournament	Winner	Runners-up	Semifinalists	Quarterfinalists
June 5	Daegu, South Korea; Hard; M25; Singles and Doubles Draws	(South Korea) Park Ui-sung; 6–3, 7–5	(South Korea) Lee Jea-moon	(Japan) Takuya Kumasaka (Czech Republic) Dominik Palán	(South Korea) Chung Yun-seong (Japan) Yuki Mochizuki (South Korea) Kim Geun-jun (Japan) Jumpei Yamasaki
June 5	Daegu, South Korea; Hard; M25; Singles and Doubles Draws	(South Korea) Jeong Yeong-seok (South Korea) Park Ui-sung; 2–6, 6–0, [10–5]	(South Korea) Cho Seung-woo (South Korea) Kim Dong-ju	(Japan) Takuya Kumasaka (Czech Republic) Dominik Palán	(South Korea) Chung Yun-seong (Japan) Yuki Mochizuki (South Korea) Kim Geun-jun (Japan) Jumpei Yamasaki
June 5	Córdoba, Spain; Clay; M25; Singles and Doubles Draws	(Spain) Javier Barranco Cosano; 6–4, 6–1	(Spain) Daniel Mérida	(Spain) Martín Landaluce (France) Valentin Royer	(Spain) Álvaro López San Martín (Spain) Carlos López Montagud (Spain) Max Alcalá Gurri (Ukraine) Georgii Kravchenko
June 5	Córdoba, Spain; Clay; M25; Singles and Doubles Draws	(Argentina) Valerio Aboian (Bolivia) Murkel Dellien; 6–3, 6–7^{(4–7)}, [11–9]	(Spain) Imanol López Morillo (Spain) Benjamín Winter López	(Spain) Martín Landaluce (France) Valentin Royer	(Spain) Álvaro López San Martín (Spain) Carlos López Montagud (Spain) Max Alcalá Gurri (Ukraine) Georgii Kravchenko
June 5	Luzhou, China; Hard; M25; Singles and Doubles Draws	(China) Li Hanwen; 6–4, 6–2	(China) Liu Hanyiu	(China) Mo Yecong (Germany) Jimmy Yang	(Chinese Taipei) Huang Tsung-hao (China) Li Zhe (China) Xiao Linang (Australia) Jeremy Jin
June 5	Luzhou, China; Hard; M25; Singles and Doubles Draws	(China) Cui Jie (Chinese Taipei) Ray Ho; 6–3, 6–2	(China) Li Hanwen (China) Sun Qian	(China) Mo Yecong (Germany) Jimmy Yang	(Chinese Taipei) Huang Tsung-hao (China) Li Zhe (China) Xiao Linang (Australia) Jeremy Jin
June 5	Kuršumlijska Banja, Serbia; Clay; M25; Singles and Doubles Draws	Alexander Zgirovsky; 6–4, 6–3	(Romania) Sebastian Gima	(France) Luka Pavlovic (Germany) Sebastian Prechtel	(Kazakhstan) Dmitry Popko (Argentina) Lautaro Midón (Argentina) Leonardo Aboian (Ukraine) Oleksandr Ovcharenko
June 5	Kuršumlijska Banja, Serbia; Clay; M25; Singles and Doubles Draws	(Argentina) Leonardo Aboian (Argentina) Federico Agustín Gómez; 6–4, 7–5	(Ukraine) Volodymyr Uzhylovskyi (Italy) Samuel Vincent Ruggeri	(France) Luka Pavlovic (Germany) Sebastian Prechtel	(Kazakhstan) Dmitry Popko (Argentina) Lautaro Midón (Argentina) Leonardo Aboian (Ukraine) Oleksandr Ovcharenko
June 5	Skopje, North Macedonia; Clay; M25; Singles and Doubles Draws	(North Macedonia) Kalin Ivanovski; 7–6^{(7–2)}, 6–4	(France) Sascha Gueymard Wayenburg	(Turkey) Ergi Kırkın (Croatia) Vito Tonejc	(Serbia) Miljan Zekić (Bosnia and Herzegovina) Mirza Bašić (Austria) Neil Oberleitner (United Kingdom) Toby Martin
June 5	Skopje, North Macedonia; Clay; M25; Singles and Doubles Draws	(France) Sascha Gueymard Wayenburg (France) Antoine Hoang; 6–1, 6–2	(Bulgaria) Yanaki Milev (Bulgaria) Petr Nesterov	(Turkey) Ergi Kırkın (Croatia) Vito Tonejc	(Serbia) Miljan Zekić (Bosnia and Herzegovina) Mirza Bašić (Austria) Neil Oberleitner (United Kingdom) Toby Martin
June 5	Jakarta, Indonesia; Hard; M25; Singles and Doubles Draws	(Turkey) Yankı Erel; 6–3, 4–6, 6–2	(Japan) Hiroki Moriya	(Vietnam) Lý Hoàng Nam (Australia) Omar Jasika	(Ukraine) Yurii Dzhavakian (India) Digvijay Pratap Singh (Chinese Taipei) Jason Jung (Japan) Kokoro Isomura
June 5	Jakarta, Indonesia; Hard; M25; Singles and Doubles Draws	(Indonesia) Nathan Anthony Barki (Indonesia) Christopher Rungkat; 6–4, 6–4	(Indonesia) Anthony Susanto (Indonesia) David Agung Susanto	(Vietnam) Lý Hoàng Nam (Australia) Omar Jasika	(Ukraine) Yurii Dzhavakian (India) Digvijay Pratap Singh (Chinese Taipei) Jason Jung (Japan) Kokoro Isomura
June 5	Sarajevo, Bosnia and Herzegovina; Clay; M15; Singles and Doubles Draws	(Germany) Elmar Ejupovic; 6–3, 6–3	(Croatia) Luka Mikrut	(Switzerland) Jakub Paul (Croatia) Matej Dodig	(Brazil) Igor Gimenez (Montenegro) Petar Jovanović (Brazil) Nicolas Zanellato (Serbia) Dušan Obradović
June 5	Sarajevo, Bosnia and Herzegovina; Clay; M15; Singles and Doubles Draws	(Argentina) Juan Bautista Otegui (Argentina) Matías Zukas; 7–6^{(7–0)}, 6–3	(Australia) Matthew Romios (Australia) Brandon Walkin	(Switzerland) Jakub Paul (Croatia) Matej Dodig	(Brazil) Igor Gimenez (Montenegro) Petar Jovanović (Brazil) Nicolas Zanellato (Serbia) Dušan Obradović
June 5	Vaasa, Finland; Hard; M15; Singles and Doubles Draws	(Sweden) Karl Friberg; 6–0, 6–4	(Finland) Patrick Kaukovalta	(Germany) Tom Gentzsch (Sweden) Jonathan Mridha	(Italy) Leonardo Rossi (Switzerland) Nicolas Kobelt (Finland) Iiro Vasa (Italy) Luca Giacomini
June 5	Vaasa, Finland; Hard; M15; Singles and Doubles Draws	(Italy) Luca Giacomini (Switzerland) Gabriele Moghini; 3–6, 6–4, 10–7	(Estonia) Johannes Seeman (Estonia) Siim Troost	(Germany) Tom Gentzsch (Sweden) Jonathan Mridha	(Italy) Leonardo Rossi (Switzerland) Nicolas Kobelt (Finland) Iiro Vasa (Italy) Luca Giacomini
June 5	Nakhon Si Thammarat, Thailand; Hard; M15; Singles and Doubles Draws	(Japan) Shinji Hazawa; 6–3, 6–4	(India) S D Prajwal Dev	(Australia) Blake Ellis (Thailand) Maximus Jones	(New Zealand) Isaac Becroft (India) Manish Sureshkumar (Thailand) Kasidit Samrej (Australia) Philip Sekulic
June 5	Nakhon Si Thammarat, Thailand; Hard; M15; Singles and Doubles Draws	(Japan) Shinji Hazawa (Japan) Ryotaro Taguchi; 6–4, 7–5	(Australia) Blake Bayldon (Australia) Blake Ellis	(Australia) Blake Ellis (Thailand) Maximus Jones	(New Zealand) Isaac Becroft (India) Manish Sureshkumar (Thailand) Kasidit Samrej (Australia) Philip Sekulic
June 5	Nyíregyháza, Hungary; Clay; M15; Singles and Doubles Draws	(Hungary) Péter Fajta; 6–3, 6–2	(Sweden) Dragoș Nicolae Mădăraș	(Czech Republic) Tadeáš Paroulek (Germany) Luca Wiedenmann	(Germany) Jakob Schnaitter (Hungary) Zsombor Velcz (Australia) Matthew Dellavedova (Argentina) Tomás Farjat
June 5	Nyíregyháza, Hungary; Clay; M15; Singles and Doubles Draws	(Germany) Jakob Schnaitter (Germany) Kai Wehnelt; Walkover	(Sweden) Dragoș Nicolae Mădăraș (Romania) Călin Manda	(Czech Republic) Tadeáš Paroulek (Germany) Luca Wiedenmann	(Germany) Jakob Schnaitter (Hungary) Zsombor Velcz (Australia) Matthew Dellavedova (Argentina) Tomás Farjat
June 5	San Diego, United States; Hard; M15; Singles and Doubles Draws	(United States) Jacob Brumm; 7–6^{(7–5)}, 6–3	(United States) Jack Anthrop	(United States) Keegan Smith (Sweden) Jonas Eriksson Ziverts	(United States) Connor Farren (France) Jaimee Floyd Angele (France) Enzo Wallart (United States) Trevor Svajda
June 5	San Diego, United States; Hard; M15; Singles and Doubles Draws	(Netherlands) Daniel de Jonge (United States) Andrew Rogers; 3–6, 7–6^{(7–5)}, 10–4	(United States) Isaiah Strode (United States) Patrik Trhac	(United States) Keegan Smith (Sweden) Jonas Eriksson Ziverts	(United States) Connor Farren (France) Jaimee Floyd Angele (France) Enzo Wallart (United States) Trevor Svajda
June 5	Tehran, Iran; Clay; M15; Singles and Doubles Draws	(Italy) Lorenzo Bocchi; 6–3, 6–7^{(2–7)}, 7–5	(United States) Alexander Stater	(India) Karan Singh (Syria) Hazem Naw	(Iran) Sina Moghimi (Italy) Gabriele Pennaforti; Alexander Chepik (Italy) Luca Fantini
June 5	Tehran, Iran; Clay; M15; Singles and Doubles Draws	Egor Agafonov (Kazakhstan) Grigoriy Lomakin; 6–3, 7–6^{(7–4)}	Erik Arutiunian; Daniel Ibragimov	(India) Karan Singh (Syria) Hazem Naw	(Iran) Sina Moghimi (Italy) Gabriele Pennaforti; Alexander Chepik (Italy) Luca Fantini
June 5	Frascati, Italy; Clay; M15; Singles and Doubles Draws	(Italy) Julian Ocleppo; 6–4, 7–5	(Italy) Stefano Napolitano	(Italy) Enrico Dalla Valle; Andrey Chepelev	(Italy) Francesco Forti (Italy) Marcello Serafini (France) Gabriel Debru (France) Émilien Voisin
June 5	Frascati, Italy; Clay; M15; Singles and Doubles Draws	(Italy) Tommaso Compagnucci (Italy) Alessandro Cortegiani; 6–3, 6–4	(France) Émilien Voisin (France) Arthur Weber	(Italy) Enrico Dalla Valle; Andrey Chepelev	(Italy) Francesco Forti (Italy) Marcello Serafini (France) Gabriel Debru (France) Émilien Voisin
June 5	Tanger, Morocco; Clay; M15; Singles and Doubles Draws	(Italy) Filippo Moroni; 6–3, 7–6^{(7–1)}	(France) Corentin Denolly	(Romania) Filip Cristian Jianu (France) Constantin Bittoun Kouzmine	(Argentina) Guido Iván Justo (Italy) Massimo Giunta (Spain) Diego Augusto Barreto Sánchez (Morocco) Yassine Dlimi
June 5	Tanger, Morocco; Clay; M15; Singles and Doubles Draws	(France) Constantin Bittoun Kouzmine (France) Corentin Denolly; 7–5, 6–3	(Italy) Luigi Sorrentino (Italy) Lorenzo Vatteroni	(Romania) Filip Cristian Jianu (France) Constantin Bittoun Kouzmine	(Argentina) Guido Iván Justo (Italy) Massimo Giunta (Spain) Diego Augusto Barreto Sánchez (Morocco) Yassine Dlimi
June 5	Monastir, Tunisia; Hard; M15; Singles and Doubles Draws	(Lebanon) Hady Habib; 6–2, 6–3	(Japan) Ryuki Matsuda	(France) Robin Bertrand (Moldova) Ilya Snițari	(Portugal) Tiago Pereira (France) Arthur Bouquier (Australia) Thomas Braithwaite (Moldova) Alexander Cozbinov
June 5	Monastir, Tunisia; Hard; M15; Singles and Doubles Draws	(Peru) Alexander Merino (Germany) Christoph Negritu; 7–5, 6–1	(France) Arthur Bouquier (France) Raphaël Lambling	(France) Robin Bertrand (Moldova) Ilya Snițari	(Portugal) Tiago Pereira (France) Arthur Bouquier (Australia) Thomas Braithwaite (Moldova) Alexander Cozbinov
June 12	Martos, Spain; Hard; M25; Singles and Doubles Draws	(China) Sun Fajing; 7–6^{(7–3)}, 6–4	(Spain) Pedro Vives Marcos	(Greece) Stefanos Sakellaridis (Portugal) Henrique Rocha	(Lithuania) Edas Butvilas (Argentina) Julio César Porras (Finland) Iiro Vasa (Spain) John Echeverría
June 12	Martos, Spain; Hard; M25; Singles and Doubles Draws	(Portugal) Jaime Faria (Portugal) Henrique Rocha; 6–3, 7–6^{(7–3)}	(India) Ramkumar Ramanathan (India) Parikshit Somani	(Greece) Stefanos Sakellaridis (Portugal) Henrique Rocha	(Lithuania) Edas Butvilas (Argentina) Julio César Porras (Finland) Iiro Vasa (Spain) John Echeverría
June 12	Nakhon Si Thammarat, Thailand; Hard; M25; Singles and Doubles Draws	(Japan) Hiroki Moriya; 2–6, 6–2, 6–2	(Thailand) Kasidit Samrej	(Australia) Philip Sekulic (Japan) Yusuke Takahashi	(Israel) Orel Kimhi (India) Siddharth Vishwakarma (Australia) Thomas Fancutt (Japan) Shinji Hazawa
June 12	Nakhon Si Thammarat, Thailand; Hard; M25; Singles and Doubles Draws	(Philippines) Francis Alcantara (Japan) Hiroki Moriya; 6–2, 6–4	(Thailand) Maximus Jones (New Zealand) Finn Reynolds	(Australia) Philip Sekulic (Japan) Yusuke Takahashi	(Israel) Orel Kimhi (India) Siddharth Vishwakarma (Australia) Thomas Fancutt (Japan) Shinji Hazawa
June 12	Risskov/Aarhus, Denmark; Clay; M25; Singles and Doubles Draws	(Denmark) Elmer Møller; 6–3, 6–3	(Sweden) Leo Borg	(Netherlands) Guy den Ouden (Turkey) Ergi Kırkın	(Netherlands) Max Houkes (Germany) Lewie Lane (Denmark) Christian Sigsgaard (Portugal) Gonçalo Oliveira
June 12	Risskov/Aarhus, Denmark; Clay; M25; Singles and Doubles Draws	(Denmark) August Holmgren (Denmark) Christian Sigsgaard; 6–4, 6–3	(Peru) Gonzalo Bueno (Sweden) Jack Karlsson Wistrand	(Netherlands) Guy den Ouden (Turkey) Ergi Kırkın	(Netherlands) Max Houkes (Germany) Lewie Lane (Denmark) Christian Sigsgaard (Portugal) Gonçalo Oliveira
June 12	Wichita, United States; Hard; M25; Singles and Doubles Draws	(United States) Ethan Quinn; 6–3, 7–5	(United States) Ozan Baris	(United States) Sebastian Gorzny (Japan) James Kent Trotter	(United States) Bruno Kuzuhara (United States) Axel Nefve (Dominican Republic) Peter Bertran (United States) Cannon Kingsley
June 12	Wichita, United States; Hard; M25; Singles and Doubles Draws	(United States) Ozan Baris (United States) Garrett Johns; 7–6^{(7–4)}, 6–3	(United States) Cannon Kingsley (Japan) James Kent Trotter	(United States) Sebastian Gorzny (Japan) James Kent Trotter	(United States) Bruno Kuzuhara (United States) Axel Nefve (Dominican Republic) Peter Bertran (United States) Cannon Kingsley
June 12	Changwon, South Korea; Hard; M25; Singles and Doubles Draws	(South Korea) Shin San-hui; 6–3, 6–3	(Japan) Yuki Mochizuki	(Japan) Renta Tokuda (Czech Republic) Dominik Palán	(South Korea) Lee Jea-moon (Japan) Rimpei Kawakami (Japan) Makoto Ochi (South Korea) Oh Chan-yeong
June 12	Changwon, South Korea; Hard; M25; Singles and Doubles Draws	(South Korea) Choe Jae-sung (South Korea) Chung Hong; 6–4, 7–6^{(8–6)}	(Japan) Shunsuke Mitsui (Japan) Keisuke Saitoh	(Japan) Renta Tokuda (Czech Republic) Dominik Palán	(South Korea) Lee Jea-moon (Japan) Rimpei Kawakami (Japan) Makoto Ochi (South Korea) Oh Chan-yeong
June 12	Grasse, France; Clay; M25; Singles and Doubles Draws	(France) Titouan Droguet; 6–1, 7–5	(France) Maxime Chazal	(Switzerland) Damien Wenger (Bolivia) Murkel Dellien	(Argentina) Hernán Casanova (Monaco) Valentin Vacherot (France) Tristan Lamasine (France) Mathys Erhard
June 12	Grasse, France; Clay; M25; Singles and Doubles Draws	(France) Antoine Hoang (France) Tristan Lamasine; 6–1, 7–6^{(7–3)}	(Brazil) Gabriel Roveri Sidney (Switzerland) Damien Wenger	(Switzerland) Damien Wenger (Bolivia) Murkel Dellien	(Argentina) Hernán Casanova (Monaco) Valentin Vacherot (France) Tristan Lamasine (France) Mathys Erhard
June 12	Chieti, Italy; Clay; M15; Singles and Doubles Draws	(Italy) Marcello Serafini; 6–0, 6–1	(Italy) Manuel Mazza	(Italy) Alessandro Pecci (Italy) Tommaso Compagnucci	(Italy) Andrea Guerrieri (Italy) Alessandro Cortegiani (Italy) Filippo Speziali (Italy) Andrea Picchione
June 12	Chieti, Italy; Clay; M15; Singles and Doubles Draws	(Italy) Andrea Picchione (Italy) Giorgio Ricca; 3–6, 7–5, [10–7]	(Italy) Alexandr Binda (Italy) Matteo De Vincentis	(Italy) Alessandro Pecci (Italy) Tommaso Compagnucci	(Italy) Andrea Guerrieri (Italy) Alessandro Cortegiani (Italy) Filippo Speziali (Italy) Andrea Picchione
June 12	Kuršumlijska Banja, Serbia; Clay; M15; Singles and Doubles Draws	(Serbia) Viktor Jović; 7–5, 6–4	(Brazil) Joao Eduardo Schiessl	(United Kingdom) Felix Gill; Marat Sharipov	Andrey Chepelev; Petr Bar Biryukov (Bulgaria) Gabriel Donev (United States) Mwendwa Mbithi
June 12	Kuršumlijska Banja, Serbia; Clay; M15; Singles and Doubles Draws	All doubles competition was cancelled due to poor weather		(United Kingdom) Felix Gill; Marat Sharipov	Andrey Chepelev; Petr Bar Biryukov (Bulgaria) Gabriel Donev (United States) Mwendwa Mbithi
June 12	Litija, Slovenia; Clay; M15; Singles and Doubles Draws	(Poland) Paweł Juszczak; 6–3, 6–1	(Ecuador) Álvaro Guillén Meza	(Germany) Luca Wiedenmann (Romania) Cezar Crețu	(Croatia) Admir Kalender (Germany) Sebastian Prechtel (Slovenia) Bor Artnak (Argentina) Tomás Farjat
June 12	Litija, Slovenia; Clay; M15; Singles and Doubles Draws	(Czech Republic) Jan Hrazdil (Czech Republic) Václav Šafránek; 6–4, 6–4	(Slovenia) Sebastian Dominko (Slovenia) Jan Kupčič	(Germany) Luca Wiedenmann (Romania) Cezar Crețu	(Croatia) Admir Kalender (Germany) Sebastian Prechtel (Slovenia) Bor Artnak (Argentina) Tomás Farjat
June 12	Rabat, Morocco; Clay; M15; Singles and Doubles Draws	(France) Valentin Royer; 5–7, 7–6^{(7–5)}, 6–2	(Spain) Pedro Ródenas	(Morocco) Walid Ahouda (Morocco) Yassine Dlimi	(Spain) Diego Augusto Barreto Sánchez (Spain) Gerard Planelles Ripoll (France) Charlélie Cosnet (Uruguay) Ignacio Carou
June 12	Rabat, Morocco; Clay; M15; Singles and Doubles Draws	(Italy) Luigi Sorrentino (Italy) Lorenzo Vatteroni; 6–4, 6–4	(Brazil) Mateo Barreiros Reyes (Brazil) Paulo André Saraiva dos Santos	(Morocco) Walid Ahouda (Morocco) Yassine Dlimi	(Spain) Diego Augusto Barreto Sánchez (Spain) Gerard Planelles Ripoll (France) Charlélie Cosnet (Uruguay) Ignacio Carou
June 12	Tianjin, China; Hard; M15; Singles and Doubles Draws	(China) Li Zhe; 6–3, ret.	(Chinese Taipei) Lee Kuan-yi	(China) Zhou Yi (Australia) Jeremy Jin	(Chinese Taipei) Huang Tsung-hao (Chinese Taipei) Ray Ho (China) Wang Aoran (China) Dong Zhenxiong
June 12	Tianjin, China; Hard; M15; Singles and Doubles Draws	(China) Li Zhe (China) Wang Aoran; 6–4, 6–2	(China) Bai Yan (China) Dong Zhenxiong	(China) Zhou Yi (Australia) Jeremy Jin	(Chinese Taipei) Huang Tsung-hao (Chinese Taipei) Ray Ho (China) Wang Aoran (China) Dong Zhenxiong
June 12	San Diego, United States; Hard; M15; Singles and Doubles Draws	(Italy) Lorenzo Claverie; 3–6, 7–5, 6–2	(Jamaica) Blaise Bicknell	(United States) Warren Wood (United States) Alexander Kotzen	(United States) Quinn Vandecasteele (United States) Matt Kuhar (United States) Rohan Murali (United States) Cash Hanzlik
June 12	San Diego, United States; Hard; M15; Singles and Doubles Draws	(United States) Colin Markes (United States) Andrew Rogers; 6–4, 6–4	(United States) Bryce Nakashima (United States) Quinn Vandecasteele	(United States) Warren Wood (United States) Alexander Kotzen	(United States) Quinn Vandecasteele (United States) Matt Kuhar (United States) Rohan Murali (United States) Cash Hanzlik
June 12	Duffel, Belgium; Clay; M15; Singles and Doubles Draws	(Germany) Jeremy Jahn; Walkover	(Netherlands) Michiel de Krom	(Belgium) Buvaysar Gadamauri (Netherlands) Ryan Nijboer	(Brazil) João Fonseca (Belgium) Tibo Colson (Germany) John Sperle (Germany) Tim Handel
June 12	Duffel, Belgium; Clay; M15; Singles and Doubles Draws	(Switzerland) Mika Brunold (Switzerland) Jakub Paul; 6–2, 4–6, [10–3]	(Belgium) Buvaysar Gadamauri (Georgia (country)) Zura Tkemaladze	(Belgium) Buvaysar Gadamauri (Netherlands) Ryan Nijboer	(Brazil) João Fonseca (Belgium) Tibo Colson (Germany) John Sperle (Germany) Tim Handel
June 12	Tehran, Iran; Clay; M15; Singles and Doubles Draws	Denis Klok; 6–2, 6–1	Erik Arutiunian	(South Africa) Alec Beckley (Italy) Gabriele Pennaforti	Egor Agafonov (Kazakhstan) Grigoriy Lomakin (France) Maxence Brovillé (Serbia) Boris Butulija
June 12	Tehran, Iran; Clay; M15; Singles and Doubles Draws	Egor Agafonov (Kazakhstan) Grigoriy Lomakin; 7–5, 6–2	(India) Yash Chaurasia (India) Ishaque Eqbal	(South Africa) Alec Beckley (Italy) Gabriele Pennaforti	Egor Agafonov (Kazakhstan) Grigoriy Lomakin (France) Maxence Brovillé (Serbia) Boris Butulija
June 12	Jakarta, Indonesia; Hard; M15; Singles and Doubles Draws	(Australia) Omar Jasika; 6–2, 6–3	(Indonesia) Justin Barki	(Japan) Yuta Kawahashi (Ukraine) Yurii Dzhavakian	(Japan) Tomohiro Masabayashi (Czech Republic) Patrik Opluštil (United Kingdom) Millen Hurrion (Japan) Kazuma Kawachi
June 12	Jakarta, Indonesia; Hard; M15; Singles and Doubles Draws	(India) Siddhant Banthia (India) Sai Karteek Reddy Ganta; 6–7^{(3–7)}, 7–5, [10–8]	(Japan) Sora Fukuda (Japan) Tomohiro Masabayashi	(Japan) Yuta Kawahashi (Ukraine) Yurii Dzhavakian	(Japan) Tomohiro Masabayashi (Czech Republic) Patrik Opluštil (United Kingdom) Millen Hurrion (Japan) Kazuma Kawachi
June 12	Monastir, Tunisia; Hard; M15; Singles and Doubles Draws	(Lebanon) Hady Habib; 6–3, 6–3	(Hong Kong) Coleman Wong	(United States) Kalman Boyd (France) Arthur Bouquier	(Poland) Filip Peliwo (Switzerland) Noah Lopez (Tunisia) Aziz Ouakaa (Italy) Pietro Marino
June 12	Monastir, Tunisia; Hard; M15; Singles and Doubles Draws	(Brazil) Gilbert Klier Júnior (Brazil) Christian Oliveira; 7-5, 6-4	(Peru) Alexander Merino (Germany) Christoph Negritu	(United States) Kalman Boyd (France) Arthur Bouquier	(Poland) Filip Peliwo (Switzerland) Noah Lopez (Tunisia) Aziz Ouakaa (Italy) Pietro Marino
June 19	Anseong, South Korea; Clay; M25; Singles and Doubles Draws	(South Korea) Gerard Campaña Lee; 7–5, 6–4	(South Korea) Shin San-hui	(South Korea) Chung Yun-seong (Japan) Yuki Mochizuki	(Japan) Shunsuke Mitsui (Japan) Taisei Ichikawa (Japan) Daisuke Sumizawa (South Korea) Chung Hong
June 19	Anseong, South Korea; Clay; M25; Singles and Doubles Draws	(South Korea) Chung Yun-seong (Japan) Takeru Yuzuki; 7–6^{(7–3)}, 6–4	(Japan) Shunsuke Mitsui (Japan) Naoki Tajima	(South Korea) Chung Yun-seong (Japan) Yuki Mochizuki	(Japan) Shunsuke Mitsui (Japan) Taisei Ichikawa (Japan) Daisuke Sumizawa (South Korea) Chung Hong
June 19	Montauban, France; Clay; M25; Singles and Doubles Draws	(Monaco) Valentin Vacherot; 6–4, 2–6, 7–6^{(7–4)}	(France) Titouan Droguet	(France) Tristan Lamasine (Germany) Tim Handel	(Germany) Jeremy Jahn (France) Tom Paris (France) Sascha Gueymard Wayenburg (France) Arthur Reymond
June 19	Montauban, France; Clay; M25; Singles and Doubles Draws	(Switzerland) Yannik Steinegger (Switzerland) Damien Wenger; 6–4, 6–2	(France) Mayeul Darras (France) Benjamin Pietri	(France) Tristan Lamasine (Germany) Tim Handel	(Germany) Jeremy Jahn (France) Tom Paris (France) Sascha Gueymard Wayenburg (France) Arthur Reymond
June 19	Cattolica, Italy; Clay; M25; Singles and Doubles Draws	(Italy) Enrico Dalla Valle; 6–4, 6–2	(Italy) Samuel Vincent Ruggeri	(Peru) Gonzalo Bueno (Italy) Marcello Serafini	(Italy) Julian Ocleppo; Kirill Kivattsev (Brazil) Daniel Dutra da Silva (Spain) Carlos López Montagud
June 19	Cattolica, Italy; Clay; M25; Singles and Doubles Draws	(Italy) Filippo Morano (Italy) Gabriele Piraino; 6–4, 6–4	(Italy) Giorgio Ricca (Italy) Augusto Virgili	(Peru) Gonzalo Bueno (Italy) Marcello Serafini	(Italy) Julian Ocleppo; Kirill Kivattsev (Brazil) Daniel Dutra da Silva (Spain) Carlos López Montagud
June 19	Mungia, Spain; Clay (i); M25; Singles and Doubles Draws	(Portugal) Henrique Rocha; 6–3, 6–4	(Spain) Pedro Vives Marcos	(Greece) Stefanos Sakellaridis (Spain) Alex Martínez	(United States) Oliver Crawford (Denmark) Kane Bonsach Ganley; Svyatoslav Gulin (Portugal) Pedro Araújo
June 19	Mungia, Spain; Clay (i); M25; Singles and Doubles Draws	(Spain) Iñaki Montes de la Torre (Spain) Antonio Prat; 6–4, 6–2	Svyatoslav Gulin (India) Parikshit Somani	(Greece) Stefanos Sakellaridis (Spain) Alex Martínez	(United States) Oliver Crawford (Denmark) Kane Bonsach Ganley; Svyatoslav Gulin (Portugal) Pedro Araújo
June 19	Netanya, Israel; Hard; M25; Singles and Doubles Draws	(Poland) Martyn Pawelski; 6–1, 7–5	(Poland) Filip Peliwo	(Netherlands) Fons van Sambeek (Israel) Daniel Cukierman	(Israel) Edan Leshem (United States) Trey Hilderbrand (Portugal) Duarte Vale (Turkey) Tuncay Duran
June 19	Netanya, Israel; Hard; M25; Singles and Doubles Draws	(Israel) Daniel Cukierman (Israel) Edan Leshem; 6–3, 6–3	(United States) Trey Hilderbrand (United States) Noah Schachter	(Netherlands) Fons van Sambeek (Israel) Daniel Cukierman	(Israel) Edan Leshem (United States) Trey Hilderbrand (Portugal) Duarte Vale (Turkey) Tuncay Duran
June 19	Tulsa, United States; Hard; M25; Singles and Doubles Draws	(Australia) Adam Walton; 6–1, 6–3	(United States) Nick Chappell	(United Kingdom) Aidan McHugh (United States) Alfredo Perez	(United States) Ethan Quinn (United States) Garrett Johns (United States) Adam Neff (United States) Cannon Kingsley
June 19	Tulsa, United States; Hard; M25; Singles and Doubles Draws	(United States) Ozan Baris (United States) Garrett Johns; 6–2, 7–5	(United States) Mac Kiger (Canada) Benjamin Sigouin	(United Kingdom) Aidan McHugh (United States) Alfredo Perez	(United States) Ethan Quinn (United States) Garrett Johns (United States) Adam Neff (United States) Cannon Kingsley
June 19	Poprad, Slovakia; Clay; M25; Singles and Doubles Draws	(Czech Republic) Patrik Rikl; 3–6, 7–6^{(7–5)}, 6–4	(Czech Republic) Andrew Paulson	(United States) Toby Kodat (Ukraine) Vladyslav Orlov	(Australia) Matthew Romios (Czech Republic) Michael Vrbenský (United States) Sebastian Sec (Slovakia) Lukáš Palovič
June 19	Poprad, Slovakia; Clay; M25; Singles and Doubles Draws	(Ukraine) Vladyslav Orlov (Czech Republic) Daniel Pátý; Walkover	(Uzbekistan) Denis Istomin; Evgeny Karlovskiy	(United States) Toby Kodat (Ukraine) Vladyslav Orlov	(Australia) Matthew Romios (Czech Republic) Michael Vrbenský (United States) Sebastian Sec (Slovakia) Lukáš Palovič
June 19	Santo Domingo, Dominican Republic; Hard; M15; Singles and Doubles Draws	(United States) Tauheed Browning; 7–6^{(7–5)}, 5–7, 7–6^{(10–8)}	(Canada) Liam Draxl	(Chile) Daniel Antonio Núñez (Barbados) Darian King	(Canada) Justin Boulais (United States) Tyler Stice (United States) Jake van Emburgh (Canada) Joshua Lapadat
June 19	Santo Domingo, Dominican Republic; Hard; M15; Singles and Doubles Draws	(Canada) Liam Draxl (Canada) Joshua Lapadat; 4–6, 6–3, [10–4]	(United States) Keshav Chopra (United States) Andres Martin	(Chile) Daniel Antonio Núñez (Barbados) Darian King	(Canada) Justin Boulais (United States) Tyler Stice (United States) Jake van Emburgh (Canada) Joshua Lapadat
June 19	Štore, Slovenia; Clay; M15; Singles and Doubles Draws	(Ecuador) Álvaro Guillén Meza; 6–4, 6–0	(Czech Republic) Dominik Kellovský	(Slovenia) Bor Artnak (New Zealand) Alexander Klintcharov	(Poland) Paweł Ciaś (Czech Republic) Martin Krumich (Italy) Andrea Guerrieri (Germany) Luca Wiedenmann
June 19	Štore, Slovenia; Clay; M15; Singles and Doubles Draws	(Czech Republic) Matthew William Donald (Czech Republic) Jakub Nicod; 6–2, 6–2	(Bulgaria) Alexander Donski (Czech Republic) Dominik Kellovský	(Slovenia) Bor Artnak (New Zealand) Alexander Klintcharov	(Poland) Paweł Ciaś (Czech Republic) Martin Krumich (Italy) Andrea Guerrieri (Germany) Luca Wiedenmann
June 19	Los Angeles, United States; Hard; M15; Singles and Doubles Draws	(United States) Omni Kumar; 6–4, 6–1	(United States) Quinn Vandecasteele	(United States) Ryan Seggerman (United States) Alafia Ayeni	(United States) Stefan Dostanic (United States) Kareem Al Allaf (Sweden) Arvid Nordquist (Sweden) Jonas Eriksson Ziverts
June 19	Los Angeles, United States; Hard; M15; Singles and Doubles Draws	(United States) Eduardo Nava (United States) Nathan Ponwith; 6–4, 6–3	(Italy) Lorenzo Claverie (United States) Nicholas Godsick	(United States) Ryan Seggerman (United States) Alafia Ayeni	(United States) Stefan Dostanic (United States) Kareem Al Allaf (Sweden) Arvid Nordquist (Sweden) Jonas Eriksson Ziverts
June 19	South Bend, United States; Hard; M15; Singles and Doubles Draws	(United States) James Tracy; 6–1, 6–2	(United States) Strong Kirchheimer	(Jamaica) Blaise Bicknell (United States) Axel Nefve	(United States) Colton Smith (United States) Aidan Kim (United States) Ryan Fishback (Australia) Edward Winter
June 19	South Bend, United States; Hard; M15; Singles and Doubles Draws	(Colombia) Andrei Duarte (United States) Ryan Fishback; 6–4, 6–2	(Jamaica) Blaise Bicknell (Jamaica) John Chin	(Jamaica) Blaise Bicknell (United States) Axel Nefve	(United States) Colton Smith (United States) Aidan Kim (United States) Ryan Fishback (Australia) Edward Winter
June 19	Jakarta, Indonesia; Hard; M15; Singles and Doubles Draws	(Japan) Sora Fukuda; 6–4, 6–3	(Ukraine) Yurii Dzhavakian	(Australia) Omar Jasika (Indonesia) Muhammad Rifqi Fitriadi	(Australia) Cehin Akay (Japan) Koki Matsuda (Japan) Shuichi Sekiguchi (India) Sidharth Rawat
June 19	Jakarta, Indonesia; Hard; M15; Singles and Doubles Draws	(Indonesia) Justin Barki (Netherlands) Thiemo de Bakker; 6–4, 6–3	(India) Siddhant Banthia (India) Nitin Kumar Sinha	(Australia) Omar Jasika (Indonesia) Muhammad Rifqi Fitriadi	(Australia) Cehin Akay (Japan) Koki Matsuda (Japan) Shuichi Sekiguchi (India) Sidharth Rawat
June 19	Casablanca, Morocco; Clay; M15; Singles and Doubles Draws	(Morocco) Yassine Dlimi; 7–5, 7–6^{(7–1)}	(Spain) Jorge Martínez Martínez	(Spain) Alejandro Manzanera Pertusa (France) Corentin Denolly	(Morocco) Walid Ahouda (Italy) Stefano Reitano (Uruguay) Franco Roncadelli (India) Manas Dhamne
June 19	Casablanca, Morocco; Clay; M15; Singles and Doubles Draws	(Spain) Carles Hernández (Spain) Alejandro Manzanera Pertusa; 6–4, 6–2	(Spain) Max Alcalá Gurri (Spain) Jorge Martínez Martínez	(Spain) Alejandro Manzanera Pertusa (France) Corentin Denolly	(Morocco) Walid Ahouda (Italy) Stefano Reitano (Uruguay) Franco Roncadelli (India) Manas Dhamne
June 19	Tianjin, China; Hard; M15; Singles and Doubles Draws	(China) Bai Yan; 7–5, 6–3	(China) Mo Yecong	(China) Xiao Linang (New Zealand) Isaac Becroft	(Chinese Taipei) Lee Kuan-yi (China) Wang Chukang (China) Wang Aoran (Germany) Jimmy Yang
June 19	Tianjin, China; Hard; M15; Singles and Doubles Draws	(Switzerland) Luca Castelnuovo (China) Wang Aoran; 7–6^{(7–2)}, 6–3	(China) Yu Bingyu (China) Zheng Zhan	(China) Xiao Linang (New Zealand) Isaac Becroft	(Chinese Taipei) Lee Kuan-yi (China) Wang Chukang (China) Wang Aoran (Germany) Jimmy Yang
June 19	Cluj-Napoca, Romania; Clay; M15; Singles and Doubles Draws	(Romania) Radu Mihai Papoe; 2–6, 7–6^{(7–4)}, 6–4	(Luxembourg) Chris Rodesch	(Germany) Marvin Möller (Romania) Gabi Adrian Boitan	(Italy) Valerio Perruzza (Romania) Vlad Andrei Dancu (Italy) Simone Roncalli (Germany) Johannes Härteis
June 19	Cluj-Napoca, Romania; Clay; M15; Singles and Doubles Draws	(Romania) Radu Mihai Papoe (Romania) Dan Alexandru Tomescu; 6–3, 6–2	(Romania) Bogdan Pavel (Romania) Gabi Adrian Boitan	(Germany) Marvin Möller (Romania) Gabi Adrian Boitan	(Italy) Valerio Perruzza (Romania) Vlad Andrei Dancu (Italy) Simone Roncalli (Germany) Johannes Härteis
June 19	Kuršumlijska Banja, Serbia; Clay; M15; Singles and Doubles Draws	Andrey Chepelev; 1–6, 6–4, 6–3	(Argentina) Leonardo Aboian	(Argentina) Federico Agustín Gómez (Bosnia and Herzegovina) Andrej Nedić	(France) Luka Pavlovic (Argentina) Lautaro Midón (Hungary) Zsombor Velcz (Serbia) Stefan Popović
June 19	Kuršumlijska Banja, Serbia; Clay; M15; Singles and Doubles Draws	(United States) William Grant (United States) Tyler Zink; 6–7^{(3–7)}, 6–4, [14–12]	(Czech Republic) Hynek Bartoň (Switzerland) Patrick Schön	(Argentina) Federico Agustín Gómez (Bosnia and Herzegovina) Andrej Nedić	(France) Luka Pavlovic (Argentina) Lautaro Midón (Hungary) Zsombor Velcz (Serbia) Stefan Popović
June 19	Saarlouis, Germany; Clay; M15; Singles and Doubles Draws	(Netherlands) Sander Jong; 6–1, 6–0	(Switzerland) Jeffrey von der Schulenburg	(Brazil) João Fonseca (Germany) Liam Gavrielides	(Syria) Hazem Naw (Netherlands) Lodewijk Weststrate (Australia) Matthew Dellavedova (Poland) Marcel Zieliński
June 19	Saarlouis, Germany; Clay; M15; Singles and Doubles Draws	(France) Robin Catry (Switzerland) Luca Stäheli; 6–1, 6–2	(Switzerland) Dylan Dietrich (Brazil) João Fonseca	(Brazil) João Fonseca (Germany) Liam Gavrielides	(Syria) Hazem Naw (Netherlands) Lodewijk Weststrate (Australia) Matthew Dellavedova (Poland) Marcel Zieliński
June 19	Monastir, Tunisia; Hard; M15; Singles and Doubles Draws	(Hong Kong) Coleman Wong; 6–3, 5–7, 6–1	(Italy) Luca Giacomini	(Australia) Thomas Braithwaite (Brazil) Gilbert Klier Júnior	(Greece) Alexandros Skorilas (Romania) Vladislav Melnic (France) Nicolas Tepmahc (France) Antoine Ghibaudo
June 19	Monastir, Tunisia; Hard; M15; Singles and Doubles Draws	(Italy) Luca Giacomini (Greece) Alexandros Skorilas; 6–3, 7–6^{(7–3)}	(United Kingdom) Billy Blaydes (United Kingdom) Freddy Blaydes	(Australia) Thomas Braithwaite (Brazil) Gilbert Klier Júnior	(Greece) Alexandros Skorilas (Romania) Vladislav Melnic (France) Nicolas Tepmahc (France) Antoine Ghibaudo
June 26	Bakio, Spain; Hard; M25; Singles and Doubles Draws	(Portugal) Henrique Rocha; 6–2, 6–2	(France) Lucas Poullain	(Spain) Alejandro García (Greece) Stefanos Sakellaridis	(Ivory Coast) Eliakim Coulibaly (Switzerland) Noah Lopez (Spain) Pedro Vives Marcos (Spain) Antonio Prat
June 26	Bakio, Spain; Hard; M25; Singles and Doubles Draws	(Spain) John Echeverría (China) Sun Fajing; 6–3, 6–2	(France) Robin Bertrand (Switzerland) Noah Lopez	(Spain) Alejandro García (Greece) Stefanos Sakellaridis	(Ivory Coast) Eliakim Coulibaly (Switzerland) Noah Lopez (Spain) Pedro Vives Marcos (Spain) Antonio Prat
June 26	Arlon, Belgium; Clay; M25; Singles and Doubles Draws	(Belgium) Tibo Colson; 6–2, 6–2	(Austria) Sandro Kopp	(France) Valentin Royer (France) Maxime Mora	(Spain) David Jordà Sanchis (Germany) Louis Wessels (Luxembourg) Alex Knaff (Germany) Henri Squire
June 26	Arlon, Belgium; Clay; M25; Singles and Doubles Draws	(Ukraine) Vladyslav Orlov (Brazil) Gabriel Roveri Sidney; 0–6, 7–5, [10–5]	(Belgium) Alessio Basile (Belgium) Alexander Blockx	(France) Valentin Royer (France) Maxime Mora	(Spain) David Jordà Sanchis (Germany) Louis Wessels (Luxembourg) Alex Knaff (Germany) Henri Squire
June 26	Bourg-en-Bresse, France; Clay; M25; Singles and Doubles Draws	(Monaco) Valentin Vacherot; 6–1, 2–6, 7–5	(France) Tristan Lamasine	(France) Matteo Martineau (Spain) Martín Landaluce	(France) Ugo Blanchet (France) Maxime Chazal (United Kingdom) Anton Matusevich (France) Tom Paris
June 26	Bourg-en-Bresse, France; Clay; M25; Singles and Doubles Draws	(Austria) David Pichler (India) Parikshit Somani; 6–2, 7–6^{(7–3)}	(France) Maxence Beaugé (France) Lucas Bouquet	(France) Matteo Martineau (Spain) Martín Landaluce	(France) Ugo Blanchet (France) Maxime Chazal (United Kingdom) Anton Matusevich (France) Tom Paris
June 26	Netanya, Israel; Hard; M25; Singles and Doubles Draws	(Israel) Yshai Oliel; 1–6, 7–6^{(7–5)}, 6–2	(Poland) Filip Peliwo	(Israel) Edan Leshem (Israel) Ofek Shimanov	(Israel) Jordan Hasson (Israel) Orel Kimhi (Israel) Aaron Cohen (Israel) Ron Ellouck
June 26	Netanya, Israel; Hard; M25; Singles and Doubles Draws	(United States) Trey Hilderbrand (United States) Noah Schachter; Walkover	(Israel) Daniel Cukierman (Israel) Edan Leshem	(Israel) Edan Leshem (Israel) Ofek Shimanov	(Israel) Jordan Hasson (Israel) Orel Kimhi (Israel) Aaron Cohen (Israel) Ron Ellouck
June 26	Santo Domingo, Dominican Republic; Hard; M25; Singles and Doubles Draws	(United States) Martin Damm; 7–6^{(7–5)}, 6–4	(Canada) Liam Draxl	(Australia) Bernard Tomic (United States) Nick Chappell	(Dominican Republic) Roberto Cid Subervi (United States) Tauheed Browning (United States) James Tracy (Barbados) Darian King
June 26	Santo Domingo, Dominican Republic; Hard; M25; Singles and Doubles Draws	(Dominican Republic) Peter Bertran (Japan) Seita Watanabe; 6–7^{(3–7)}, 6–1, [10–5]	(United States) Nick Chappell (Republic of Ireland) Osgar O'Hoisin	(Australia) Bernard Tomic (United States) Nick Chappell	(Dominican Republic) Roberto Cid Subervi (United States) Tauheed Browning (United States) James Tracy (Barbados) Darian King
June 26	Rosario-Santa Fe, Argentina; Clay; M25; Singles and Doubles Draws	(Argentina) Juan Ignacio Londero; 6–3, 6–2	(Paraguay) Daniel Vallejo	(Argentina) Tomás Farjat (Argentina) Alejo Lorenzo Lingua Lavallén	(Monaco) Lucas Catarina (Argentina) Guido Iván Justo (Chile) Ignacio Antonio Becerra Otarola (Argentina) Lorenzo Joaquín Rodríguez
June 26	Rosario-Santa Fe, Argentina; Clay; M25; Singles and Doubles Draws	(Argentina) Lorenzo Joaquín Rodríguez (Argentina) Fermín Tenti; 7–5, 6–3	(Chile) Ignacio Antonio Becerra Otarola (Chile) Nicolás Villalón	(Argentina) Tomás Farjat (Argentina) Alejo Lorenzo Lingua Lavallén	(Monaco) Lucas Catarina (Argentina) Guido Iván Justo (Chile) Ignacio Antonio Becerra Otarola (Argentina) Lorenzo Joaquín Rodríguez
June 26	Irvine, United States; Hard; M15; Singles and Doubles Draws	(United States) Learner Tien; 7–5, 6–2	(United States) Quinn Vandecasteele	(Australia) Edward Winter (United States) Isaiah Strode	(Netherlands) Daniel de Jonge (Italy) Lorenzo Claverie (United States) Tristan Boyer (United States) Warren Wood
June 26	Irvine, United States; Hard; M15; Singles and Doubles Draws	(United States) Bryce Nakashima (United States) Learner Tien; 6–4, 6–2	(United Kingdom) Joshua Goodger (United Kingdom) Matthew Summers	(Australia) Edward Winter (United States) Isaiah Strode	(Netherlands) Daniel de Jonge (Italy) Lorenzo Claverie (United States) Tristan Boyer (United States) Warren Wood
June 26	Jakarta, Indonesia; Hard; M15; Singles and Doubles Draws	(Indonesia) Muhammad Rifqi Fitriadi; 6–3, 6–4	(Thailand) Palaphoom Kovapitukted	(India) S D Prajwal Dev (India) Siddhant Banthia	(Japan) Yuta Kawahashi (Ukraine) Yurii Dzhavakian (Netherlands) Thiemo de Bakker (Australia) Moerani Bouzige
June 26	Jakarta, Indonesia; Hard; M15; Singles and Doubles Draws	(India) S D Prajwal Dev (India) Nitin Kumar Sinha; 6–1, 6–2	(Japan) Kazuma Kawachi (Japan) Shuichi Sekiguchi	(India) S D Prajwal Dev (India) Siddhant Banthia	(Japan) Yuta Kawahashi (Ukraine) Yurii Dzhavakian (Netherlands) Thiemo de Bakker (Australia) Moerani Bouzige
June 26	Wrocław, Poland; Clay; M15; Singles and Doubles Draws	(Portugal) Gonçalo Oliveira; 6–2, 6–4	(Czech Republic) Jiří Barnat	Kirill Kivattsev (Uzbekistan) Sergey Fomin	(United States) Tyler Zink (Poland) Michał Mikuła (Slovakia) Peter Benjamín Privara (Republic of Ireland) Michael Agwi
June 26	Wrocław, Poland; Clay; M15; Singles and Doubles Draws	(Poland) Szymon Kielan; Kirill Kivattsev; 6–1, 6–3	(Czech Republic) Daniel Pátý (Czech Republic) David Poljak	Kirill Kivattsev (Uzbekistan) Sergey Fomin	(United States) Tyler Zink (Poland) Michał Mikuła (Slovakia) Peter Benjamín Privara (Republic of Ireland) Michael Agwi
June 26	Tianjin, China; Hard; M15; Singles and Doubles Draws	(China) Bai Yan; 6–2, ret	(China) Wang Aoran	(Australia) Jacob Bradshaw (China) Mo Yecong	(Chinese Taipei) Huang Tsung-hao (Switzerland) Luca Castelnuovo (China) Wang Chukang (Chinese Taipei) Ray Ho
June 26	Tianjin, China; Hard; M15; Singles and Doubles Draws	(Switzerland) Luca Castelnuovo (China) Wang Aoran; 7–6^{(7–5)}, 6–0	(China) Sun Qian (China) Xiao Linang	(Australia) Jacob Bradshaw (China) Mo Yecong	(Chinese Taipei) Huang Tsung-hao (Switzerland) Luca Castelnuovo (China) Wang Chukang (Chinese Taipei) Ray Ho
June 26	Casablanca, Morocco; Clay; M15; Singles and Doubles Draws	(Spain) Mario González Fernández; 6–3, 6–3	(Uruguay) Franco Roncadelli	(Morocco) Yassine Dlimi (Argentina) Juan Estevez	(Sweden) Leo Borg (Morocco) Adam Moundir (Italy) Gabriele Pennaforti (Ecuador) Cayetano March
June 26	Casablanca, Morocco; Clay; M15; Singles and Doubles Draws	(Chile) Nicolás Bruna (Uruguay) Franco Roncadelli; Walkover	(France) Sven Corbinais (Chile) Diego Fernández Flores	(Morocco) Yassine Dlimi (Argentina) Juan Estevez	(Sweden) Leo Borg (Morocco) Adam Moundir (Italy) Gabriele Pennaforti (Ecuador) Cayetano March
June 26	Alkmaar, Netherlands; Clay; M15; Singles and Doubles Draws	(Netherlands) Sander Jong; 6–4, 6–3	(Denmark) Elmer Møller	(Switzerland) Jeffrey von der Schulenburg (United Kingdom) Luke Simkiss	(Sweden) Karl Friberg (Netherlands) Brian Bozemoj (Netherlands) Alec Deckers (Netherlands) Ryan Nijboer
June 26	Alkmaar, Netherlands; Clay; M15; Singles and Doubles Draws	(Netherlands) Sander Jong (Netherlands) Ryan Nijboer; 6–7^{(2–7)}, 6–0, [10–8]	(Germany) Lewie Lane (Netherlands) Stijn Pel	(Switzerland) Jeffrey von der Schulenburg (United Kingdom) Luke Simkiss	(Sweden) Karl Friberg (Netherlands) Brian Bozemoj (Netherlands) Alec Deckers (Netherlands) Ryan Nijboer
June 26	Belgrade, Serbia; Clay; M15; Singles and Doubles Draws	(Turkey) Ergi Kırkın; 3–6, 7–5, 6–3	(Serbia) Miljan Zekić	Andrey Chepelev (Argentina) Leonardo Aboian	Marat Sharipov (Switzerland) Patrick Schön (Slovakia) Lukáš Palovič (France) Luka Pavlovic
June 26	Belgrade, Serbia; Clay; M15; Singles and Doubles Draws	(Argentina) Leonardo Aboian (Argentina) Federico Agustín Gómez; 7–6^{(7–5)}, 7–6^{(7–1)}	(Norway) Andreja Petrovic (France) Loris Pourroy	Andrey Chepelev (Argentina) Leonardo Aboian	Marat Sharipov (Switzerland) Patrick Schön (Slovakia) Lukáš Palovič (France) Luka Pavlovic
June 26	Kamen, Germany; Clay; M15; Singles and Doubles Draws	Svyatoslav Gulin; 2–6, 6–4, 6–2	(Czech Republic) Hynek Bartoň	(Netherlands) Niels Visker (Germany) Tom Gentzsch	(Syria) Hazem Naw (France) Arthur Reymond (France) François Musitelli (Germany) Mariano Dedura Palomero
June 26	Kamen, Germany; Clay; M15; Singles and Doubles Draws	(Bulgaria) Anthony Genov; Svyatoslav Gulin; Walkover	(Ukraine) Illya Beloborodko (Georgia (country)) Aleksandre Metreveli	(Netherlands) Niels Visker (Germany) Tom Gentzsch	(Syria) Hazem Naw (France) Arthur Reymond (France) François Musitelli (Germany) Mariano Dedura Palomero
June 26	Bergamo, Italy; Clay; M15; Singles and Doubles Draws	(Spain) Iñaki Montes de la Torre; 6–3, 4–6, 7–5	(Argentina) Mariano Kestelboim	(Argentina) Valerio Aboian (Italy) Federico Iannaccone	(Italy) Alessandro Ragazzi (Italy) Gabriele Maria Noce (Switzerland) Nicolás Parizzia (Italy) Carlo Alberto Fossati
June 26	Bergamo, Italy; Clay; M15; Singles and Doubles Draws	(Italy) Leonardo Rossi (Italy) Luigi Sorrentino; 2–6, 7–6^{(7–5)}, [10–8]	(Italy) Filiberto Fumagalli (Italy) Samuel Vincent Ruggeri	(Argentina) Valerio Aboian (Italy) Federico Iannaccone	(Italy) Alessandro Ragazzi (Italy) Gabriele Maria Noce (Switzerland) Nicolás Parizzia (Italy) Carlo Alberto Fossati
June 26	Celje, Slovenia; Clay; M15; Singles and Doubles Draws	(Italy) Enrico Dalla Valle; 6–0, 6–1	(Poland) Paweł Ciaś	(Slovenia) Bor Artnak (Austria) Sebastian Sorger	(Croatia) Matej Dodig (Slovenia) Blaž Rola (Croatia) Vito Tonejc (Belgium) Buvaysar Gadamauri
June 26	Celje, Slovenia; Clay; M15; Singles and Doubles Draws	(Belgium) Buvaysar Gadamauri (Czech Republic) Jakub Nicod; 6–2, 6–3	(Bulgaria) Alexander Donski (Australia) Zaharije-Zak Talic	(Slovenia) Bor Artnak (Austria) Sebastian Sorger	(Croatia) Matej Dodig (Slovenia) Blaž Rola (Croatia) Vito Tonejc (Belgium) Buvaysar Gadamauri
June 26	Monastir, Tunisia; Hard; M15; Singles and Doubles Draws	(United Kingdom) Oliver Tarvet; 6–1, 6–1	Igor Kudriashov	(France) Alexis Gautier (Brazil) Gilbert Klier Júnior	(Greece) Alexandros Skorilas (France) Loann Massard (Italy) Luca Giacomini (United Kingdom) James Connel
June 26	Monastir, Tunisia; Hard; M15; Singles and Doubles Draws	(Portugal) Fábio Coelho (Tunisia) Aziz Ouakaa; 3–6, 6–4, [10–4]	(Estonia) Johannes Seeman (Estonia) Siim Troost	(France) Alexis Gautier (Brazil) Gilbert Klier Júnior	(Greece) Alexandros Skorilas (France) Loann Massard (Italy) Luca Giacomini (United Kingdom) James Connel
