= 2023 AON Open Challenger =

- Date: 4–10 September
- Edition: 19th
- Surface: Clay
- Location: Genoa, Italy

Champions

Singles
- (Brazil) Thiago Seyboth Wild

Doubles
- (Italy) Giovanni Oradini / (Italy) Lorenzo Rottoli
← 2022 ·	AON Open Challenger	· 2024 →

The 2023 AON Open Challenger was a professional tennis tournament played on clay courts. It was the 19th edition of the tournament which was part of the 2023 ATP Challenger Tour. It took place in Genoa, Italy between 4 and 10 September 2023.

== Singles main-draw entrants ==
=== Seeds ===
Country	Player	Rank^{1}	Seed
	Alexander Shevchenko	83	1
ARG	Federico Coria	91	2
BRA	Thiago Seyboth Wild	106	3
HUN	Zsombor Piros	112	4
BRA	Thiago Monteiro	118	5
FRA	Benoît Paire	125	6
ITA	Fabio Fognini	146	7
ITA	Andrea Vavassori	163	8

- ^{1} Rankings are as of 28 August 2023.

=== Other entrants ===
The following players received wildcards into the singles main draw:

- (Italy) Enrico Dalla Valle
- (Italy) Giovanni Fonio
- (Italy) Marcello Serafini

The following players received entry from the qualifying draw:

- (Lebanon) Hady Habib
- (Italy) Federico Iannaccone
- (Italy) Giovanni Oradini
- (Italy) Andrea Picchione
- (Italy) Lorenzo Rottoli
- (Chinese Taipei) Tseng Chun-hsin

The following player received entry as a lucky loser:

- (Serbia) Miljan Zekić

== Champions ==
=== Singles ===
- (Brazil) Thiago Seyboth Wild def. (Italy) Fabio Fognini 6–2, 7–6^{(7–3)}.

=== Doubles ===
- (Italy) Giovanni Oradini / (Italy) Lorenzo Rottoli def. (Serbia) Ivan Sabanov / (Serbia) Matej Sabanov 6–4, 6–3.
