= Lorenzo Rottoli =

Italian tennis player (born 2002)

- Country (sports): Italy
- Born: 19 February 2002 (age 24) Como, Italy
- Plays: Right-handed (two-handed backhand)
- Coach: Fabrizio Rottoli
- Prize money: US $91,846

Singles
- Career record: 0–0
- Career titles: 3 Futures
- Highest ranking: No. 403 (18 September 2023)
- Current ranking: No. 796 (9 November 2026)

Doubles
- Career record: 0–0
- Career titles: 1 Challenger
- Highest ranking: No. 245 (24 June 2024)
- Current ranking: No. 496 (9 November 2026)
- Last updated on: 9 November 2026.

Lorenzo Rottoli (born 19 February 2002) is an Italian tennis player. He has a career high ATP singles ranking of No. 403 achieved on 18 September 2023 and a career high doubles ranking of No. 245 achieved on 24 June 2024.

Rottoli has won 1 ATP Challenger doubles title at the 2023 AON Open Challenger with Giovanni Oradini.
