= Giovanni Oradini =

Italian tennis player (born 1997)

- Country (sports): Italy
- Born: 14 September 1997 (age 29) Rovereto, Italy
- Height: 1.88 m (6 ft 2 in)
- Plays: Left-handed
- College: Mississippi State
- Prize money: US $153,293

Singles
- Career record: 0–0
- Career titles: 3 Futures
- Highest ranking: No. 352 (9 January 2023)
- Current ranking: No. 590 (9 November 2026)

Doubles
- Career record: 0–0
- Career titles: 1 Challenger, 2 Futures
- Highest ranking: No. 232 (19 August 2024)
- Current ranking: No. 444 (9 November 2026)
- Last updated on: 9 November 2026.

Giovanni Oradini (born 14 September 1997) is an Italian tennis player. Oradini has a career high ATP singles ranking of No. 352 achieved on 9 January 2023 and a career high doubles ranking of No. 232 achieved on 19 August 2024.

Oradini has won 1 ATP Challenger doubles title at the 2023 AON Open Challenger with Lorenzo Rottoli.

Oradini played college tennis at Mississippi State.
