= 2018 Fairfield Challenger – Singles =

Singles
- 2018 Fairfield Challenger

Final
- Champion: (United States) Bjorn Fratangelo
- Runner-up: (Australia) Alex Bolt
- Score: 6–4, 6–3

Events
Singles	Doubles
← 2017 ·	Fairfield Challenger	· 2019 →

Mackenzie McDonald was the defending champion but chose not to defend his title.

Bjorn Fratangelo won the title after defeating Alex Bolt 6–4, 6–3 in the final.

== Seeds ==
1. (Australia) Jordan Thompson (quarterfinals)
2. (South Africa) Lloyd Harris (quarterfinals)
3. (United States) Noah Rubin (second round)
4. (United States) Reilly Opelka (first round)
5. (Spain) Adrián Menéndez Maceiras (semifinals, retired)
6. (Norway) Casper Ruud (semifinals)
7. (Croatia) Ivo Karlović (first round)
8. (Australia) Alex Bolt (final)

== Draw ==
=== Key ===
- Q = Qualifier
- WC = Wild card
- LL = Lucky loser
- Alt = Alternate
- SE = Special exempt
- PR = Protected ranking
- ITF = ITF entry
- JE = Junior exempt
- w/o = Walkover
- r = Retired
- d = Defaulted
- SR = Special ranking

=== Finals ===
Semifinals
(United States) Bjorn Fratangelo	6	6
6	(Norway) Casper Ruud	2	2
5	(Spain) Adrián Menéndez Maceiras	5	6^{r}
8	(Australia) Alex Bolt	7	6

Final
(United States) Bjorn Fratangelo	6	6
8	(Australia) Alex Bolt	4	3

=== Top half ===
First round
1	(Australia) J Thompson	7^{7}	6
(United Kingdom) J Clarke	6^{3}	1
WC	(United States) A Rybakov	6^{8}	3
SE	(France) M Janvier	7^{10}	6
(United States) B Fratangelo	3	6	6
(Australia) J-P Smith	6	2	4
(Germany) D Köpfer	6	6
7	(Croatia) I Karlović	4	4
4	(United States) R Opelka	6^{2}	6^{5}
(Austria) L Miedler	7^{7}	7^{7}
Q	(Germany) S Fanselow	6	5	6
(Turkey) C İlkel	2	7	0
(Australia) M Polmans	4	7^{9}	3
(United States) JC Aragone	6	6^{7}	6
Q	(United States) K King	3	4
6	(Norway) C Ruud	6	6

Second round
1	(Australia) J Thompson	6^{5}	6	6
SE	(France) M Janvier	7^{7}	3	0
(United States) B Fratangelo	7	6
(Germany) D Köpfer	5	3
(Austria) L Miedler	4	1
Q	(Germany) S Fanselow	6	6
(United States) JC Aragone	1	6^{4}
6	(Norway) C Ruud	6	7^{7}

Quarterfinals
1	(Australia) J Thompson	1	4
(United States) B Fratangelo	6	6
Q	(Germany) S Fanselow	1	0
6	(Norway) C Ruud	6	6

Semifinals
(United States) B Fratangelo	6	6
6	(Norway) C Ruud	2	2

=== Bottom half ===
First round
5	(Spain) A Menéndez Maceiras	7^{7}	3	6
LL	(United States) M Krueger	6^{5}	6	1
(Switzerland) H Laaksonen	6	4	1
(Netherlands) T de Bakker	4	6	6
Q	(United States) E King	6	1	4
WC	(United States) J. J. Wolf	2	6	6
WC	(Argentina) A Geller	3	4
3	(United States) N Rubin	6	6
8	(Australia) A Bolt	7	3	6
(Australia) T Kokkinakis	5	6	4
WC	(United States) C Altamirano	7^{7}	0
(United Kingdom) D Evans	6^{2}	0^{r}
Q	(United States) T Paul	6	6
Alt	(Barbados) D King	2	2
(United States) D Young	6^{12}	6	5
2	(South Africa) L Harris	7^{14}	4	7

Second round
5	(Spain) A Menéndez Maceiras	6	6
(Netherlands) T de Bakker	4	3
WC	(United States) J. J. Wolf	6	6
3	(United States) N Rubin	3	2
8	(Australia) A Bolt	7^{8}	6^{3}	7^{7}
WC	(United States) C Altamirano	6^{6}	7^{7}	6^{5}
Q	(United States) T Paul	6	5	5
2	(South Africa) L Harris	4	7	7

Quarterfinals
5	(Spain) A Menéndez Maceiras	6	6
WC	(United States) J. J. Wolf	0	4
8	(Australia) A Bolt	6	6
2	(South Africa) L Harris	3	4

Semifinals
5	(Spain) A Menéndez Maceiras	5	6^{r}
8	(Australia) A Bolt	7	6
