= 2022 Fairfield Challenger – Singles =

Singles
- 2022 Fairfield Challenger

Final
- Champion: (United States) Michael Mmoh
- Runner-up: (Canada) Gabriel Diallo
- Score: 6–3, 6–2

Events
Singles	Doubles
← 2019 ·	Fairfield Challenger	· 2023 →

Christopher O'Connell was the defending champion but chose not to defend his title.

Michael Mmoh won the title after defeating Gabriel Diallo 6–3, 6–2 in the final.

== Seeds ==
1. (United States) Denis Kudla (withdrew)
2. (United States) Stefan Kozlov (first round)
3. (United States) Michael Mmoh (champion)
4. (United States) Ben Shelton (second round)
5. (France) Enzo Couacaud (quarterfinals)
6. (United States) Ernesto Escobedo (first round)
7. (China) Shang Juncheng (quarterfinals)
8. (United States) Mitchell Krueger (first round)

== Draw ==
Key

- Q = Qualifier
- WC = Wild card
- LL = Lucky loser
- Alt = Alternate
- ITF = ITF entry
- PR = Protected ranking
- SR = Special ranking
- SE = Special exempt
- JE = Junior exempt
- JR = Junior Accelerator Programme entrant
- CO = College Accelerator Programme entrant
- NG = Next Gen Accelerator Program entrant
- w/o = Walkover
- r = Retired
- d = Defaulted

=== Finals ===
Semifinals
Q	(United States) Alafia Ayeni	3	1
(Canada) Gabriel Diallo	6	6
3	(United States) Michael Mmoh	6	6
Q	(United States) Sam Riffice	4	4

Final
(Canada) Gabriel Diallo	3	2
3	(United States) Michael Mmoh	6	6

=== Top half ===
First round
Q	(United States) A Ayeni	6	7
(Greece) M Pervolarakis	3	5
SE	(United States) Z Svajda	6	1	0
Q	(Denmark) A Holmgren	3	6	6
(Germany) S Fanselow	4	6^{7}
Q	(United States) T Sandgren	6	7^{9}
Alt	(Italy) G Oradini	2	6	6
6	(United States) E Escobedo	6	4	4
4	(United States) B Shelton	6	6
WC	(United States) A Mayo	3	3
(Canada) G Diallo	2	6	6
(Switzerland) L Riedi	6	4	2
LL	(Tunisia) M Jaziri	2	2
Q	(United States) A Perez	6	6
(Ecuador) R Quiroz	6^{1}	6	1
5	(France) E Couacaud	7^{7}	4	6

Second round
Q	(United States) A Ayeni	6	6
Q	(Denmark) A Holmgren	3	4
Q	(United States) T Sandgren	6^{5}	6	6
Alt	(Italy) G Oradini	7^{7}	4	0
4	(United States) B Shelton	7	6^{5}	3
(Canada) G Diallo	5	7^{7}	6
Q	(United States) A Perez	4	5
5	(France) E Couacaud	6	7

Quarterfinals
Q	(United States) A Ayeni	6	7^{9}
Q	(United States) T Sandgren	4	6^{7}
(Canada) G Diallo	7^{8}	7
5	(France) E Couacaud	6^{6}	5

Semifinals
Q	(United States) A Ayeni	3	1
(Canada) G Diallo	6	6

=== Bottom half ===
First round
7	(China) J Shang	7	4	6
(United Kingdom) C Broom	5	6	3
(Monaco) V Vacherot	7^{7}	7^{7}
WC	(United Kingdom) J Fearnley	6^{2}	6^{5}
(Colombia) N Mejía	6	2	3
Q	(Moldova) A Cozbinov	3	6	6
(United Kingdom) P Jubb	2	0^{r}
3	(United States) M Mmoh	6	0
8	(United States) M Krueger	6^{5}	7^{7}	6^{1}
(Canada) A Galarneau	7^{7}	6^{4}	7^{7}
(United States) E Zhu	6	6
(Zimbabwe) B Lock	3	4
(United States) G Nanda	4	4
WC	(United States) Christian Langmo	6	6
Q	(United States) S Riffice	3	6	6
2	(United States) S Kozlov	6	2	3

Second round
7	(China) J Shang	6	6
(Monaco) V Vacherot	4	3
Q	(Moldova) A Cozbinov	2	2
3	(United States) M Mmoh	6	6
(Canada) A Galarneau	6	6
(United States) E Zhu	1	4
WC	(United States) C Langmo	7^{7}	3	4
Q	(United States) S Riffice	6^{5}	6	6

Quarterfinals
7	(China) J Shang	3	1
3	(United States) M Mmoh	6	6
(Canada) A Galarneau	4	6^{3}
Q	(United States) S Riffice	6	7^{7}

Semifinals
3	(United States) M Mmoh	6	6
Q	(United States) S Riffice	4	4
