= 2025 Fairfield Challenger – Singles =

Singles
- 2025 Fairfield Challenger

Final
- Champion: (Japan) Jay Dylan Friend
- Runner-up: (Australia) Edward Winter
- Score: 6–7^{(3–7)}, 6–3, 6–2

Events
Singles	Doubles
← 2024 ·	Fairfield Challenger	· 2026 →

Learner Tien was the defending champion but chose not to defend his title.

Jay Dylan Friend won the title after defeating Edward Winter 6–7^{(3–7)}, 6–3, 6–2 in the final.

== Seeds ==
1. (Lebanon) Benjamin Hassan (second round)
2. (Kazakhstan) Dmitry Popko (second round)
3. (Czech Republic) Marek Gengel (second round)
4. (United States) Garrett Johns (semifinals)
5. (Jordan) Abdullah Shelbayh (quarterfinals)
6. (Germany) Mats Rosenkranz (quarterfinals)
7. (Australia) Moerani Bouzige (first round)
8. (United States) Michael Mmoh (second round)

== Draw ==
Key

- Q = Qualifier
- WC = Wild card
- LL = Lucky loser
- Alt = Alternate
- ITF = ITF entry
- PR = Protected ranking
- SR = Special ranking
- SE = Special exempt
- JE = Junior exempt
- JR = Junior Accelerator Programme entrant
- CO = College Accelerator Programme entrant
- NG = Next Gen Accelerator Program entrant
- w/o = Walkover
- r = Retired
- d = Defaulted

=== Finals ===
Semifinals
(United States) Andre Ilagan	3	2
Q	(Australia) Edward Winter	6	6
4	(United States) Garrett Johns	3	3
Q	(Japan) Jay Dylan Friend	6	6

Final
Q	(Australia) Edward Winter	7^{7}	3	2
Q	(Japan) Jay Dylan Friend	6^{3}	6	6

=== Top half ===
First round
1	(Lebanon) B Hassan	6	3	6
(Belgium) T Colson	4	6	1
(United States) Andre Ilagan	4	6	6
JR	(United States) K Bigun	6	4	3
WC	(United States) Dominique Rolland	6	6
(United States) Maxwell McKennon	2	0
(United States) T Zink	6	6
7	(Australia) M Bouzige	3	1
3	(Czech Republic) M Gengel	6	6
Q	(United States) Evan Bynoe	4	1
(Sweden) O Wallin	3	4
Q	(Australia) E Winter	6	6
WC	(United States) Emon van Loben Sels	7	2	5
Q	(Spain) Roger Pascual Ferrà	5	6	7
(Slovenia) B Artnak	1	5
5	(Jordan) A Shelbayh	6	7

Second round
1	(Lebanon) B Hassan	4	7	4
(United States) A Ilagan	6	5	6
WC	(United States) D Rolland	6	6
(United States) T Zink	4	2
3	(Czech Republic) M Gengel	4	6^{9}
Q	(Australia) E Winter	6	7^{11}
Q	(Spain) R Pascual Ferrà	2	4
5	(Jordan) A Shelbayh	6	6

Quarterfinals
(United States) A Ilagan	7^{7}	7^{7}
WC	(United States) D Rolland	6^{5}	6^{1}
Q	(Australia) E Winter	4	6	6
5	(Jordan) A Shelbayh	6	4	2

Semifinals
(United States) A Ilagan	3	2
Q	(Australia) E Winter	6	6

=== Bottom half ===
First round
6	(Germany) M Rosenkranz	6	6
(United States) Tristan McCormick	0	2
PR	(United States) Micah Braswell	4	6	6
(United Kingdom) O Tarvet	6	2	1
Alt	(United States) C Kingsley	7^{7}	4	4
WC	(United States) A Fenty	6^{5}	6	6
(Australia) P Sekulic	4	4
4	(United States) G Johns	6	6
8	(United States) M Mmoh	7^{7}	6
Q	(United States) Q Vandecasteele	6^{5}	3
(India) Aryan Shah	2	6	2
Q	(Japan) JD Friend	6	3	6
(United States) D Milavsky	6	6
Q	(Barbados) D King	3	1
(Germany) M Wiskandt	3	5
2	(Kazakhstan) D Popko	6	7

Second round
6	(Germany) M Rosenkranz	6	6
PR	(United States) M Braswell	2	3
WC	(United States) A Fenty	1	4
4	(United States) G Johns	6	6
8	(United States) M Mmoh	2	6^{4}
Q	(Japan) JD Friend	6	7^{7}
(United States) D Milavsky	4	6	6
2	(Kazakhstan) D Popko	6	3	4

Quarterfinals
6	(Germany) M Rosenkranz	7^{9}	2	3
4	(United States) G Johns	6^{7}	6	6
Q	(Japan) JD Friend	7^{7}	6
(United States) D Milavsky	6^{5}	0

Semifinals
4	(United States) G Johns	3	3
Q	(Japan) JD Friend	6	6
