= 2018 Fairfield Challenger – Doubles =

Doubles
- 2018 Fairfield Challenger

Final
- Champions: (Thailand) Sanchai Ratiwatana (Indonesia) Christopher Rungkat
- Runners-up: (Finland) Harri Heliövaara (Switzerland) Henri Laaksonen
- Score: 6–0, 7–6^{(11–9)}

Events
Singles	Doubles
← 2017 ·	Fairfield Challenger	· 2019 →

Luke Bambridge and David O'Hare were the defending champions but chose not to defend their title.

Sanchai Ratiwatana and Christopher Rungkat won the title after defeating Harri Heliövaara and Henri Laaksonen 6–0, 7–6^{(11–9)} in the final.

== Seeds ==
1. (Thailand) Sanchai Ratiwatana / (Indonesia) Christopher Rungkat (champions)
2. (South Africa) Ruan Roelofse / (Australia) John-Patrick Smith (quarterfinals)
3. (United States) Evan King / (United States) Nathan Pasha (first round)
4. (Japan) Toshihide Matsui / (Denmark) Frederik Nielsen (first round)

== Draw ==
=== Key ===
- Q = Qualifier
- WC = Wild card
- LL = Lucky loser
- Alt = Alternate
- SE = Special exempt
- PR = Protected ranking
- ITF = ITF entry
- JE = Junior exempt
- w/o = Walkover
- r = Retired
- d = Defaulted
- SR = Special ranking

First round
1	(Thailand) Sa Ratiwatana (Indonesia) C Rungkat	6	6
(Australia) T Kokkinakis (Australia) M Reid	3	4
Q	(Sweden) A Göransson (Sweden) A Siljeström	6	2	[6]
WC	(United States) H Johnson (United States) Y Johnson	4	6	[10]
3	(United States) E King (United States) N Pasha	3	5
WC	(United States) JC Aragone (United States) M Krueger	6	7
(Switzerland) M-A Hüsler (Netherlands) S Verbeek	6	6
(Mexico) H Hach Verdugo (Spain) A Menéndez Maceiras	4	4
PR	(South Africa) L Harris (South Africa) D O'Brien	5	4
(United States) R Galloway (Venezuela) R Maytín	7	6
(United States) A Lawson (United States) H Reese	6	7^{7}
4	(Japan) T Matsui (Denmark) F Nielsen	3	6^{3}
(Finland) H Heliövaara (Switzerland) H Laaksonen	7^{7}	7^{7}
(Philippines) R Gonzales (United States) N Lammons	6^{2}	6^{2}
WC	(United States) D Nguyen (United States) M Seeberger	7^{7}	3	[5]
2	(South Africa) R Roelofse (Australia) J-P Smith	6^{4}	6	[10]

Quarterfinals
1	(Thailand) Sa Ratiwatana (Indonesia) C Rungkat	6	5	[10]
WC	(United States) H Johnson (United States) Y Johnson	4	7	[6]
WC	(United States) JC Aragone (United States) M Krueger	2	4
(Switzerland) M-A Hüsler (Netherlands) S Verbeek	6	6
(United States) R Galloway (Venezuela) R Maytín	w/o
(United States) A Lawson (United States) H Reese
(Finland) H Heliövaara (Switzerland) H Laaksonen	3	6	[10]
2	(South Africa) R Roelofse (Australia) J-P Smith	6	2	[7]

Semifinals
1	(Thailand) Sa Ratiwatana (Indonesia) C Rungkat	6	6
(Switzerland) M-A Hüsler (Netherlands) S Verbeek	4	4
(United States) R Galloway (Venezuela) R Maytín	5	4
(Finland) H Heliövaara (Switzerland) H Laaksonen	7	6

Final
1	(Thailand) Sa Ratiwatana (Indonesia) C Rungkat	6	7^{11}
(Finland) H Heliövaara (Switzerland) H Laaksonen	0	6^{9}
