= 2023 Fairfield Challenger – Doubles =

Doubles
- 2023 Fairfield Challenger

Final
- Champions: (United States) Evan King (United States) Reese Stalder
- Runners-up: (United States) Vasil Kirkov (United States) Denis Kudla
- Score: 7–5, 6–3

Events
Singles	Doubles
← 2022 ·	Fairfield Challenger	· 2024 →

Julian Cash and Henry Patten were the defending champions but chose not to defend their title.

Evan King and Reese Stalder won the title after defeating Vasil Kirkov and Denis Kudla 7–5, 6–3 in the final.

== Seeds ==
1. (United States) Evan King / (United States) Reese Stalder (champions)
2. (United States) William Blumberg / (Venezuela) Luis David Martínez (semifinals)
3. (United Kingdom) Luke Johnson / (Tunisia) Skander Mansouri (first round)
4. (Mexico) Hans Hach Verdugo / (New Zealand) Artem Sitak (first round)

== Draw ==
=== Key ===
- Q = Qualifier
- WC = Wild card
- LL = Lucky loser
- Alt = Alternate
- SE = Special exempt
- PR = Protected ranking
- ITF = ITF entry
- JE = Junior exempt
- w/o = Walkover
- r = Retired
- d = Defaulted
- SR = Special ranking

First round
1	(United States) E King (United States) R Stalder	6	6^{6}	[10]
(United States) A Lawson (Australia) C Puttergill	4	7^{8}	[8]
(United States) T-S Kwiatkowski (Switzerland) A Ritschard	6	6
(Philippines) R Gonzales (United States) N Moreno de Alboran	4	4
4	(Mexico) H Hach Verdugo (New Zealand) A Sitak	4	4
(Argentina) FA Gómez (Canada) K Stevenson	6	6
WC	(United States) Alexander Chang (United States) Ryder Jackson	6^{5}	3
(United States) M Kiger (Canada) B Sigouin	7^{7}	6
(United States) V Kirkov (United States) D Kudla	7	6
WC	(United States) E Spizzirri (United States) T Zink	5	2
(United States) G Goldhoff (United States) A Perez	7^{7}	7^{10}
3	(United Kingdom) L Johnson (Tunisia) S Mansouri	6^{4}	6^{8}
(Moldova) A Cozbinov (Denmark) A Holmgren	7	6
(South Africa) Kris van Wyk (United Kingdom) M Whitehouse	5	1
(United States) C Kingsley (United States) Christian Langmo	4	2
2	(United States) W Blumberg (Venezuela) LD Martínez	6	6

Quarterfinals
1	(United States) E King (United States) R Stalder	7	7^{7}
(United States) T-S Kwiatkowski (Switzerland) A Ritschard	5	6^{3}
(Argentina) FA Gómez (Canada) K Stevenson	6	6
(United States) M Kiger (Canada) B Sigouin	4	4
(United States) V Kirkov (United States) D Kudla	6	7^{7}
(United States) G Goldhoff (United States) A Perez	2	6^{1}
(Moldova) A Cozbinov (Denmark) A Holmgren	6^{1}	3
2	(United States) W Blumberg (Venezuela) LD Martínez	7^{7}	6

Semifinals
1	(United States) E King (United States) R Stalder	6	6
(Argentina) FA Gómez (Canada) K Stevenson	3	2
(United States) V Kirkov (United States) D Kudla	7^{8}	7
2	(United States) W Blumberg (Venezuela) LD Martínez	6^{6}	5

Final
1	(United States) E King (United States) R Stalder	7	6
(United States) V Kirkov (United States) D Kudla	5	3
