= 2017 Fairfield Challenger – Singles =

Singles
- 2017 Fairfield Challenger

Final
- Champion: (United States) Mackenzie McDonald
- Runner-up: (United States) Bradley Klahn
- Score: 6–4, 6–2

Events
Singles	Doubles
- Fairfield Challenger

Santiago Giraldo was the defending champion but chose not to defend his title.

Mackenzie McDonald won the title after defeating Bradley Klahn 6–4, 6–2 in the final.

== Seeds ==
1. (United States) Ernesto Escobedo (second round)
2. (United States) Tennys Sandgren (quarterfinals)
3. (United States) Bjorn Fratangelo (quarterfinals)
4. (Germany) Maximilian Marterer (semifinals)
5. (United Kingdom) Cameron Norrie (withdrew)
6. (United States) Stefan Kozlov (first round)
7. (India) Ramkumar Ramanathan (first round)
8. (Serbia) Nikola Milojević (quarterfinals)
9. (United States) Michael Mmoh (second round)

== Draw ==
Key

- Q = Qualifier
- WC = Wild card
- LL = Lucky loser
- Alt = Alternate
- ITF = ITF entry
- PR = Protected ranking
- SR = Special ranking
- SE = Special exempt
- JE = Junior exempt
- JR = Junior Accelerator Programme entrant
- CO = College Accelerator Programme entrant
- NG = Next Gen Accelerator Program entrant
- w/o = Walkover
- r = Retired
- d = Defaulted

=== Finals ===
Semifinals
SE	(United States) Bradley Klahn	6	6
4	(Germany) Maximilian Marterer	1	3
Q	(Australia) Christopher O'Connell	4	5
(United States) Mackenzie McDonald	6	7

Final
SE	(United States) Bradley Klahn	4	2
(United States) Mackenzie McDonald	6	6

=== Top half ===
First round
1	(United States) E Escobedo	5	6	6
WC	(United States) A Sarkissian	7	0	2
SE	(United States) B Klahn	1	6	6
SE	(United States) K King	6	1	1
(Canada) F Auger-Aliassime	4	6	6
Q	(Czech Republic) J Šátral	6	3	4
(Canada) B Schnur	1	5
8	(Serbia) N Milojević	6	7
4	(Germany) M Marterer	6	7^{7}
(United Kingdom) B Klein	4	6^{2}
Q	(South Africa) R Roelofse	4	4
LL	(United States) S Bangoura	6	6
WC	(Argentina) A Geller	2	4
Q	(Germany) S Fanselow	6	6
WC	(United States) E King	1	6	6^{5}
9	(United States) M Mmoh	6	4	7^{7}

Second round
1	(United States) E Escobedo	4	7^{9}	3
SE	(United States) B Klahn	6	6^{7}	6
(Canada) F Auger-Aliassime	2	4
8	(Serbia) N Milojević	6	6
4	(Germany) M Marterer	6	6
LL	(United States) S Bangoura	3	2
Q	(Germany) S Fanselow	7^{7}	7^{7}
9	(United States) M Mmoh	6^{2}	6^{5}

Quarterfinals
SE	(United States) B Klahn	4	6	6
8	(Serbia) N Milojević	6	3	4
4	(Germany) M Marterer	6	7
Q	(Germany) S Fanselow	4	5

Semifinals
SE	(United States) B Klahn	6	6
4	(Germany) M Marterer	1	3

=== Bottom half ===
First round
7	(India) R Ramanathan	4	6	4
(Germany) T Kamke	6	4	6
(United States) D Kudla	5	3
Q	(Australia) C O'Connell	7	6
LL	(Colombia) A González	6	6
(Australia) J-P Smith	1	4
LL	(United Kingdom) A Ward	6	6^{5}	4
3	(United States) B Fratangelo	3	7^{7}	6
6	(United States) S Kozlov	4	7	1
(United States) M McDonald	6	5	6
PR	(Canada) F Dancevic	4	4
(Barbados) D King	6	6
(Australia) S Groth	4	6	5
(United States) N Rubin	6	3	7
(United States) M Krueger	3	7^{7}	6^{5}
2	(United States) T Sandgren	6	6^{2}	7^{7}

Second round
(Germany) T Kamke	6	3	4
Q	(Australia) C O'Connell	0	6	6
LL	(Colombia) A González	6^{5}	6^{5}
3	(United States) B Fratangelo	7^{7}	7^{7}
(United States) M McDonald	6	6
(Barbados) D King	3	1
(United States) N Rubin	6^{1}	3
2	(United States) T Sandgren	7^{7}	6

Quarterfinals
Q	(Australia) C O'Connell	7^{7}	5	6
3	(United States) B Fratangelo	6^{5}	7	4
(United States) M McDonald	7^{7}	6
2	(United States) T Sandgren	6^{3}	2

Semifinals
Q	(Australia) C O'Connell	4	5
(United States) M McDonald	6	7
