= 2018 Fairfield Challenger =

- Date: 8–14 October
- Edition: 4th
- Surface: Hard
- Location: Fairfield, California, United States

Champions

Singles
- (United States) Bjorn Fratangelo

Doubles
- (Thailand) Sanchai Ratiwatana / (Indonesia) Christopher Rungkat
← 2017 ·	Fairfield Challenger	· 2019 →

The 2018 Fairfield Challenger was a professional tennis tournament played on hard courts. It was the fourth edition of the tournament which was part of the 2018 ATP Challenger Tour. It took place in Fairfield, California, United States between October 8 and October 14, 2018.

== Singles main-draw entrants ==
=== Seeds ===
Country	Player	Rank^{1}	Seed
AUS	Jordan Thompson	106	1
RSA	Lloyd Harris	121	2
USA	Noah Rubin	127	3
USA	Reilly Opelka	129	4
ESP	Adrián Menéndez Maceiras	130	5
NOR	Casper Ruud	135	6
CRO	Ivo Karlović	137	7
AUS	Alex Bolt	158	8

- ^{1} Rankings are as of October 1, 2018.

=== Other entrants ===
The following players received wildcards into the singles main draw:

- (United States) Collin Altamirano
- (Argentina) Axel Geller
- (United States) Alex Rybakov
- (United States) J. J. Wolf

The following player received entry into the singles main draw as a special exempt:

- (France) Maxime Janvier

The following player received entry into the singles main draw as an alternate:

- (Barbados) Darian King

The following players received entry from the qualifying draw:

- (Germany) Sebastian Fanselow
- (United States) Evan King
- (United States) Kevin King
- (United States) Tommy Paul

The following player received entry as a lucky loser:

- (United States) Mitchell Krueger

== Champions ==
=== Singles ===
- (United States) Bjorn Fratangelo def. (Australia) Alex Bolt 6–4, 6–3.

=== Doubles ===
- (Thailand) Sanchai Ratiwatana / (Indonesia) Christopher Rungkat def. (Finland) Harri Heliövaara / (Switzerland) Henri Laaksonen 6–0, 7–6^{(11–9)}.
