= 2023 Fairfield Challenger =

- Date: 9–15 October
- Edition: 7th
- Surface: Hard
- Location: Fairfield, California, United States

Champions

Singles
- (United States) Zachary Svajda

Doubles
- (United States) Evan King / (United States) Reese Stalder
← 2022 ·	Fairfield Challenger	· 2024 →

The 2023 Fairfield Pro Tennis Championship was a professional tennis tournament played on hardcourts. It was the seventh edition of the tournament which was part of the 2023 ATP Challenger Tour. It took place in Fairfield, California, United States between October 9 and October 15, 2023.

== Singles main-draw entrants ==
=== Seeds ===
Country	Player	Rank^{1}	Seed
USA	Alex Michelsen	110	1
USA	Nicolas Moreno de Alboran	152	2
USA	Denis Kudla	165	3
USA	Zachary Svajda	170	4
CAN	Alexis Galarneau	174	5
AUS	Adam Walton	199	6
USA	Tennys Sandgren	204	7
SUI	Alexander Ritschard	209	8

- ^{1} Rankings are as of September 25, 2023.

=== Other entrants ===
The following players received wildcards into the singles main draw:

- (United States) Ozan Baris
- (United States) Thai-Son Kwiatkowski
- (United States) Aidan Mayo

The following players received entry into the singles main draw using protected rankings:

- (United States) Christian Harrison
- (Canada) ~~Brayden Schnur~~

The following players received entry into the singles main draw as alternates:

- (United States) Christian Langmo
- (Tunisia) Skander Mansouri

The following players received entry from the qualifying draw:

- (United States) Stefan Dostanic
- (Denmark) August Holmgren
- (United States) Strong Kirchheimer
- (United States) Alfredo Perez
- (United States) Keegan Smith
- (United States) Learner Tien

The following player received entry as a lucky loser:

- (Argentina) Federico Agustín Gómez

== Champions ==
=== Singles ===
- (United States) Zachary Svajda def. (United States) Nishesh Basavareddy 6–4, 6–1.

=== Doubles ===
- (United States) Evan King / (United States) Reese Stalder def. (United States) Vasil Kirkov / (United States) Denis Kudla 7–5, 6–3.
