= 2023 Fairfield Challenger – Singles =

Singles
- 2023 Fairfield Challenger

Final
- Champion: (United States) Zachary Svajda
- Runner-up: (United States) Nishesh Basavareddy
- Score: 6–4, 6–1

Events
Singles	Doubles
← 2022 ·	Fairfield Challenger	· 2024 →

Michael Mmoh was the defending champion but chose not to defend his title.

Zachary Svajda won the title after defeating Nishesh Basavareddy 6–4, 6–1 in the final.

== Seeds ==
1. (United States) Alex Michelsen (quarterfinals)
2. (United States) Nicolas Moreno de Alboran (first round)
3. (United States) Denis Kudla (first round)
4. (United States) Zachary Svajda (champion)
5. (Canada) Alexis Galarneau (first round)
6. (Australia) Adam Walton (first round)
7. (United States) Tennys Sandgren (second round)
8. (Switzerland) Alexander Ritschard (semifinals)

== Draw ==
=== Key ===
- Q = Qualifier
- WC = Wild card
- LL = Lucky loser
- Alt = Alternate
- ITF = ITF entry
- PR = Protected ranking
- SR = Special ranking
- SE = Special exempt
- JE = Junior exempt
- JR = Junior Accelerator Programme entrant
- CO = College Accelerator Programme entrant
- NG = Next Gen Accelerator Program entrant
- w/o = Walkover
- r = Retired
- d = Defaulted

=== Finals ===
Semifinals
(United States) Nishesh Basavareddy	3	7	6
(United States) Steve Johnson	6	5	3
4	(United States) Zachary Svajda	6	6
8	(Switzerland) Alexander Ritschard	3	1

Final
(United States) Nishesh Basavareddy	4	1
4	(United States) Zachary Svajda	6	6

=== Top half ===
First round
1	(United States) A Michelsen	2	7^{7}	6
(Tunisia) A Dougaz	6	6^{5}	0
WC	(United States) T-S Kwiatkowski	6	6
WC	(United States) O Baris	4	4
(United States) E Spizzirri	6	3	3
LL	(Argentina) FA Gómez	3	6	6
(United States) N Basavareddy	6	7
6	(Australia) A Walton	3	5
3	(United States) D Kudla	3	4
(Australia) T Schoolkate	6	6
(Australia) B Tomic	3	6	1
(United States) S Johnson	6	1	6
PR	(United States) C Harrison	6	6
Q	(Denmark) A Holmgren	4	4
(Estonia) M Lajal	6	6^{4}	1
7	(United States) T Sandgren	1	7^{7}	6

Second round
1	(United States) A Michelsen	6	6
WC	(United States) T-S Kwiatkowski	3	4
LL	(Argentina) FA Gómez	0	0^{r}
(United States) N Basavareddy	6	1
(Australia) T Schoolkate	6^{4}	3
(United States) S Johnson	7^{7}	6
PR	(United States) C Harrison	5	6	6
7	(United States) T Sandgren	7	0	3

Quarterfinals
1	(United States) A Michelsen	3	3
(United States) N Basavareddy	6	6
(United States) S Johnson	6	6
PR	(United States) C Harrison	1	2

Semifinals
(United States) N Basavareddy	3	7	6
(United States) S Johnson	6	5	3

=== Bottom half ===
First round
5	(Canada) A Galarneau	6^{9}	0
(United States) B Holt	7^{11}	6
Alt	(United States) Christian Langmo	6	6
Q	(United States) S Kirchheimer	4	4
Alt	(Tunisia) S Mansouri	1	6	6
(Canada) V Pospisil	6	1	3
Q	(United States) S Dostanic	3	7	6^{4}
4	(United States) Z Svajda	6	5	7^{7}
8	(Switzerland) A Ritschard	7^{7}	7^{7}
Q	(United States) K Smith	6^{3}	6^{4}
(United States) P Kypson	6	6^{3}	6^{4}
WC	(United States) A Mayo	3	7^{7}	7^{7}
(United States) M Krueger	7^{8}	6
Q	(United States) A Perez	6^{6}	2
Q	(United States) L Tien	6	6^{9}	6
2	(United States) N Moreno de Alboran	2	7^{11}	4

Second round
(United States) B Holt	6	5	7^{7}
Alt	(United States) C Langmo	3	7	6^{3}
Alt	(Tunisia) S Mansouri	5	6	2
4	(United States) Z Svajda	7	0	6
8	(Switzerland) A Ritschard	7	6
WC	(United States) A Mayo	5	3
(United States) M Krueger	6	6
Q	(United States) L Tien	4	3

Quarterfinals
(United States) B Holt	4	2
4	(United States) Z Svajda	6	6
8	(Switzerland) A Ritschard	6	6
(United States) M Krueger	3	3

Semifinals
4	(United States) Z Svajda	6	6
8	(Switzerland) A Ritschard	3	1
