= 2025 Fairfield Challenger – Doubles =

Doubles
- 2025 Fairfield Challenger

Final
- Champions: (Germany) Mats Rosenkranz (Germany) Max Wiskandt
- Runners-up: (United States) Spencer Johnson (United States) Wally Thayne
- Score: 3–6, 7–5, [10–6]

Events
Singles	Doubles
- Fairfield Challenger

Ryan Seggerman and Patrik Trhac were the defending champions but chose not to defend their title.

Mats Rosenkranz and Max Wiskandt won the title after defeating Spencer Johnson and Wally Thayne 3–6, 7–5, [10–6] in the final.

== Seeds ==
1. (India) Siddhant Banthia / (India) Ramkumar Ramanathan (first round)
2. (Philippines) Francis Alcantara / (Netherlands) Thijmen Loof (quarterfinals)
3. (United States) Pranav Kumar / (Australia) Kody Pearson (first round)
4. (United Kingdom) Scott Duncan / (United Kingdom) Tom Hands (first round)

== Draw ==
Key

- Q = Qualifier
- WC = Wild card
- LL = Lucky loser
- Alt = Alternate
- ITF = ITF entry
- PR = Protected ranking
- SR = Special ranking
- SE = Special exempt
- JE = Junior exempt
- JR = Junior Accelerator Programme entrant
- CO = College Accelerator Programme entrant
- NG = Next Gen Accelerator Program entrant
- w/o = Walkover
- r = Retired
- d = Defaulted

=== Draw ===
First round
1	(India) S Banthia (India) R Ramanathan	2	1
(Australia) P Harper (United States) Q Vandecasteele	6	6
(Venezuela) Juan José Bianchi (United States) Zachary Fuchs	7^{9}	6^{4}	[10]
(United States) Maxwell McKennon (United States) Jamie Vance	6^{7}	7^{7}	[6]
4	(United Kingdom) S Duncan (United Kingdom) T Hands	6^{3}	7^{8}	[7]
WC	(United States) Alex Chang (United States) Hudson Rivera	7^{7}	6^{6}	[10]
(United States) Andre Ilagan (Antigua and Barbuda) J Maginley	6^{5}	2
(United States) Spencer Johnson (United States) Wally Thayne	7^{7}	6
WC	(United States) N Godsick (United States) Emon van Loben Sels	4	6	[8]
(Kazakhstan) D Popko (Sweden) O Wallin	6	4	[10]
(United States) A Fenty (United States) D Milavsky	6	3	[10]
3	(United States) P Kumar (Australia) K Pearson	3	6	[7]
(Germany) M Rosenkranz (Germany) M Wiskandt	6^{9}	6	[10]
(Lebanon) B Hassan (Jordan) A Shelbayh	7^{11}	4	[2]
Alt	(Poland) Fryderyk Lechno-Wasiutyński (Switzerland) Timofey Stepanov	7	4	[6]
2	(Philippines) FC Alcantara (Netherlands) T Loof	5	6	[10]

Quarterfinals
(Australia) P Harper (United States) Q Vandecasteele	4	6	[10]
(Venezuela) JJ Bianchi (United States) Z Fuchs	6	4	[8]
WC	(United States) A Chang (United States) H Rivera	6^{5}	6	[8]
(United States) S Johnson (United States) W Thayne	7^{7}	4	[10]
(Kazakhstan) D Popko (Sweden) O Wallin	7^{7}	1	[10]
(United States) A Fenty (United States) D Milavsky	6^{5}	6	[7]
(Germany) M Rosenkranz (Germany) M Wiskandt	6	6
2	(Philippines) FC Alcantara (Netherlands) T Loof	3	2

Semifinals
(Australia) P Harper (United States) Q Vandecasteele	4	6^{4}
(United States) S Johnson (United States) W Thayne	6	7^{7}
(Kazakhstan) D Popko (Sweden) O Wallin	1	6	[2]
(Germany) M Rosenkranz (Germany) M Wiskandt	6	3	[10]

Final
(United States) S Johnson (United States) W Thayne	6	5	[6]
(Germany) M Rosenkranz (Germany) M Wiskandt	3	7	[10]
