= 2016 Fairfield Challenger – Singles =

Singles
- 2016 Fairfield Challenger

Final
- Champion: (Colombia) Santiago Giraldo
- Runner-up: (France) Quentin Halys
- Score: 4–6, 6–4, 6–2

Events
Singles	Doubles
- Fairfield Challenger

Taylor Fritz was the defending champion but chose not to defend his title.

Santiago Giraldo won the title after defeating Quentin Halys 4–6, 6–4, 6–2 in the final.

== Seeds ==
1. (United States) Frances Tiafoe (second round)
2. (Colombia) Santiago Giraldo (champion)
3. (United States) Tim Smyczek (second round)
4. (Barbados) Darian King (first round)
5. (Italy) Alessandro Giannessi (quarterfinals)
6. (United States) Dennis Novikov (first round)
7. (Slovenia) Grega Žemlja (quarterfinals)
8. (Germany) Maximilian Marterer (quarterfinals, retired)

== Draw ==
Key

- Q = Qualifier
- WC = Wild card
- LL = Lucky loser
- Alt = Alternate
- ITF = ITF entry
- PR = Protected ranking
- SR = Special ranking
- SE = Special exempt
- JE = Junior exempt
- JR = Junior Accelerator Programme entrant
- CO = College Accelerator Programme entrant
- NG = Next Gen Accelerator Program entrant
- w/o = Walkover
- r = Retired
- d = Defaulted

=== Finals ===
Semifinals
(France) Quentin Halys	6	6
Q	(United Kingdom) Brydan Klein	2	4
(Belgium) Joris De Loore	3	4
2	(Colombia) Santiago Giraldo	6	6

Final
(France) Quentin Halys	6	4	2
2	(Colombia) Santiago Giraldo	4	6	6

=== Top half ===
First round
1	(United States) F Tiafoe	7^{8}	6
(Slovenia) B Rola	6^{6}	3
(United States) D Nguyen	7	4	2
(France) Q Halys	5	6	6
WC	(United States) R Opelka	6	6
Q	(Chile) H Podlipnik	3	1
(United Kingdom) L Broady	5	4
8	(Germany) M Marterer	7	6
4	(Barbados) D King	7	5	6^{4}
(Belgium) R Bemelmans	5	7	7^{7}
Q	(United Kingdom) B Klein	4	7	7
(United States) T Sandgren	6	5	5
WC	(United States) T Fawcett	4	1
Q	(United Kingdom) C Norrie	6	6
(United States) T Paul	6	6
6	(United States) D Novikov	4	4

Second round
1	(United States) F Tiafoe	2	6	5
(France) Q Halys	6	4	7
WC	(United States) R Opelka	6	6^{4}	5
8	(Germany) M Marterer	3	7^{7}	7
(Belgium) R Bemelmans	3	7	6^{4}
Q	(United Kingdom) B Klein	6	5	7^{7}
Q	(United Kingdom) C Norrie	6	3	4
(United States) T Paul	1	6	6

Quarterfinals
(France) Q Halys	6	0
8	(Germany) M Marterer	0	0^{r}
Q	(United Kingdom) B Klein	7^{7}	3	6
(United States) T Paul	6^{5}	6	1

Semifinals
(France) Q Halys	6	6
Q	(United Kingdom) B Klein	2	4

=== Bottom half ===
First round
5	(Italy) A Giannessi	6^{2}	7^{8}	6
(Republic of Ireland) J McGee	7^{7}	6^{6}	3
(Italy) L Sonego	6	6
(Canada) F Dancevic	3	0
WC	(United States) K Smith	6^{2}	3
(Belgium) J De Loore	7^{7}	6
(Canada) D Shapovalov	2	4
3	(United States) T Smyczek	6	6
7	(Slovenia) G Žemlja	7^{7}	7^{7}
(United States) N Rubin	6^{2}	6^{4}
Q	(United States) Dennis Nevolo	6	7^{7}
(United States) S Bangoura	4	6^{5}
SE	(United States) M McDonald	3	4
WC	(United States) B Baker	6	6
SE	(United States) M Mmoh	3	5
2	(Colombia) S Giraldo	6	7

Second round
5	(Italy) A Giannessi	6	6
(Italy) L Sonego	2	4
(Belgium) J De Loore	6	7^{7}
3	(United States) T Smyczek	4	6^{5}
7	(Slovenia) G Žemlja	6	6
Q	(United States) D Nevolo	2	3
WC	(United States) B Baker	4	7	4
2	(Colombia) S Giraldo	6	5	6

Quarterfinals
5	(Italy) A Giannessi	4	1
(Belgium) J De Loore	6	6
7	(Slovenia) G Žemlja	1	4
2	(Colombia) S Giraldo	6	6

Semifinals
(Belgium) J De Loore	3	4
2	(Colombia) S Giraldo	6	6
