= 2024 Fairfield Challenger – Singles =

Singles
- 2024 Fairfield Challenger

Final
- Champion: (United States) Learner Tien
- Runner-up: (Australia) Bernard Tomic
- Score: 6–0, 6–1

Events
Singles	Doubles
- Fairfield Challenger

Zachary Svajda was the defending champion but chose not to defend his title.

Learner Tien won the title after defeating Bernard Tomic 6–0, 6–1 in the final. At 39 minutes, it was the shortest completed final in the history of challengers.

== Seeds ==
1. (United States) Learner Tien (champion)
2. (Australia) Tristan Schoolkate (semifinals)
3. (United States) J. J. Wolf (first round)
4. (Kazakhstan) Dmitry Popko (quarterfinals)
5. (United States) Patrick Kypson (quarterfinals)
6. (United States) Brandon Holt (semifinals)
7. (Australia) Bernard Tomic (final)
8. (United States) Ethan Quinn (quarterfinals)

== Draw ==
Key

- Q = Qualifier
- WC = Wild card
- LL = Lucky loser
- Alt = Alternate
- ITF = ITF entry
- PR = Protected ranking
- SR = Special ranking
- SE = Special exempt
- JE = Junior exempt
- JR = Junior Accelerator Programme entrant
- CO = College Accelerator Programme entrant
- NG = Next Gen Accelerator Program entrant
- w/o = Walkover
- r = Retired
- d = Defaulted

=== Finals ===
Semifinals
1	(United States) Learner Tien	6	5	6
6	(United States) Brandon Holt	0	7	4
7	(Australia) Bernard Tomic	6	6
2	(Australia) Tristan Schoolkate	3	3

Final
1	(United States) Learner Tien	6	6
7	(Australia) Bernard Tomic	0	1

=== Top half ===
First round
1	(United States) L Tien	6	6
(Venezuela) G Oliveira	2	2
(United States) T Kodat	6	2	6
(Colombia) N Mejía	4	6	2
(Switzerland) R Bertola	3	2
(Lithuania) E Butvilas	6	6
(Slovenia) B Artnak	1	3
5	(United States) P Kypson	6	6
4	(Kazakhstan) D Popko	6	3	6
(United States) A Mayo	3	6	4
(Romania) GA Boitan	5	5
WC	(United States) R Seggerman	7	7
WC	(United States) E Spizzirri	6	3
Q	(United States) T Hilderbrand	3	1^{r}
Q	(United States) M Cassone	6^{5}	5
6	(United States) B Holt	7^{7}	7

Second round
1	(United States) L Tien	7	6
(United States) T Kodat	5	4
(Lithuania) E Butvilas	3	4
5	(United States) P Kypson	6	6
4	(Kazakhstan) D Popko	7	6
WC	(United States) R Seggerman	5	1
WC	(United States) E Spizzirri	5	5
6	(United States) B Holt	7	7

Quarterfinals
1	(United States) L Tien	1	6	6
5	(United States) P Kypson	6	3	0
4	(Kazakhstan) D Popko	2	4
6	(United States) B Holt	6	6

Semifinals
1	(United States) L Tien	6	5	6
6	(United States) B Holt	0	7	4

=== Bottom half ===
First round
7	(Australia) B Tomic	7^{8}	7^{7}
Q	(Germany) M Wiskandt	6^{6}	6^{5}
Q	(United Kingdom) M Basing	6	1	6
(United Kingdom) J Pinnington Jones	2	6	3
(France) Antoine Cornut-Chauvinc	1	4
Alt	(New Zealand) K Pannu	6	6
(Canada) A Galarneau	7^{7}	6
3	(United States) JJ Wolf	6^{2}	4
8	(United States) E Quinn	6	6
WC	(Denmark) CE Overbeck	3	0
(Netherlands) G den Ouden	6	3	4
Q	(United States) Rudy Quan	3	6	6
A Zakharov	6	6
Q	(United States) Micah Braswell	3	2
Alt	(United States) B Kuzuhara	3	4
2	(Australia) T Schoolkate	6	6

Second round
7	(Australia) B Tomic	4	7^{7}	6
Q	(United Kingdom) M Basing	6	6^{1}	1
Alt	(New Zealand) K Pannu	4	1
(Canada) A Galarneau	6	6
8	(United States) E Quinn	6	2	6
Q	(United States) R Quan	3	6	2
A Zakharov	3	4
2	(Australia) T Schoolkate	6	6

Quarterfinals
7	(Australia) B Tomic	7^{8}	1	7^{8}
(Canada) A Galarneau	6^{6}	6	6^{6}
8	(United States) E Quinn	0	7^{7}	6^{3}
2	(Australia) T Schoolkate	6	6^{3}	7^{7}

Semifinals
7	(Australia) B Tomic	6	6
2	(Australia) T Schoolkate	3	3
