= 2016 Fairfield Challenger – Doubles =

Doubles
- 2016 Fairfield Challenger

Final
- Champions: (United States) Brian Baker (United States) Mackenzie McDonald
- Runners-up: (United States) Sekou Bangoura (United States) Eric Quigley
- Score: 6–3, 6–4

Events
Singles	Doubles
- Fairfield Challenger

Johan Brunström and Frederik Nielsen were the defending champions but chose not to defend their title.

Brian Baker and Mackenzie McDonald won the title after defeating Sekou Bangoura and Eric Quigley 6–3, 6–4 in the final.

== Seeds ==
1. (Argentina) Andrés Molteni / (Chile) Hans Podlipnik (quarterfinals)
2. (Mexico) Miguel Ángel Reyes-Varela / (United States) Max Schnur (quarterfinals)
3. (South Africa) Dean O'Brien / (South Africa) Ruan Roelofse (quarterfinals)
4. (Australia) Steven de Waard / (United Kingdom) Brydan Klein (quarterfinals)

== Draw ==
Key

- Q = Qualifier
- WC = Wild card
- LL = Lucky loser
- Alt = Alternate
- ITF = ITF entry
- PR = Protected ranking
- SR = Special ranking
- SE = Special exempt
- JE = Junior exempt
- JR = Junior Accelerator Programme entrant
- CO = College Accelerator Programme entrant
- NG = Next Gen Accelerator Program entrant
- w/o = Walkover
- r = Retired
- d = Defaulted

First round
1	(Argentina) A Molteni (Chile) H Podlipnik	3	7^{9}	[10]
(United States) D Novikov (United States) T Sandgren	6	6^{7}	[6]
Q	(Australia) Michael Kwong (United States) M Seeberger	6	5	[8]
(Barbados) D King (United States) F Tiafoe	4	7	[10]
3	(South Africa) D O'Brien (South Africa) R Roelofse	6	7^{7}
WC	(United States) Connor Farren (United States) M Giron	2	6^{1}
(Italy) S Caruso (Italy) A Giannessi	6	5	[4]
(United States) S Bangoura (United States) E Quigley	3	7	[10]
(Belgium) R Bemelmans (Germany) K Krawietz	6	6
(Republic of Ireland) D O'Hare (United Kingdom) J Salisbury	3	3
(United Kingdom) L Broady (United Kingdom) L Glasspool	3	7^{8}	[4]
4	(Australia) S de Waard (United Kingdom) B Klein	6	6^{6}	[10]
WC	(United States) B Baker (United States) M McDonald	6	6
WC	(United States) Darrin Cohen (United States) Ryan Sablan	1	0
(United States) R Opelka (United States) T Paul	4	6^{13}
2	(Mexico) MÁ Reyes-Varela (United States) M Schnur	6	7^{15}

Quarterfinals
1	(Argentina) A Molteni (Chile) H Podlipnik	3	3
(Barbados) D King (United States) F Tiafoe	6	6
3	(South Africa) D O'Brien (South Africa) R Roelofse	3	3
(United States) S Bangoura (United States) E Quigley	6	6
(Belgium) R Bemelmans (Germany) K Krawietz	6	3	[10]
4	(Australia) S de Waard (United Kingdom) B Klein	4	6	[8]
WC	(United States) B Baker (United States) M McDonald	6	7
2	(Mexico) MÁ Reyes-Varela (United States) M Schnur	1	5

Semifinals
(Barbados) D King (United States) F Tiafoe	6^{5}	0
(United States) S Bangoura (United States) E Quigley	7^{7}	6
(Belgium) R Bemelmans (Germany) K Krawietz	2	7^{7}	[7]
WC	(United States) B Baker (United States) M McDonald	6	6^{5}	[10]

Final
(United States) S Bangoura (United States) E Quigley	3	4
WC	(United States) B Baker (United States) M McDonald	6	6
