= 2022 Fairfield Challenger =

- Date: 10–16 October
- Edition: 6th
- Surface: Hard
- Location: Fairfield, California, United States

Champions

Singles
- (United States) Michael Mmoh

Doubles
- (United Kingdom) Julian Cash / (United Kingdom) Henry Patten
| ← 2019 · | Fairfield Challenger | · 2023 → |

The 2022 Fairfield Pro Tennis Championship was a professional tennis tournament played on hardcourts. It was the sixth edition of the tournament which was part of the 2022 ATP Challenger Tour. It took place in Fairfield, California, United States between October 10 and October 16, 2022.

== Singles main-draw entrants ==
=== Seeds ===
| Country | Player | Rank^{1} | Seed |
|---|---|---|---|
| ~~USA~~ | ~~Denis Kudla~~ | ~~100~~ | ~~1~~ |
| USA | Stefan Kozlov | 130 | 2 |
| USA | Michael Mmoh | 132 | 3 |
| USA | Ben Shelton | 177 | 4 |
| FRA | Enzo Couacaud | 188 | 5 |
| USA | Ernesto Escobedo | 200 | 6 |
| CHN | Shang Juncheng | 203 | 7 |
| USA | Mitchell Krueger | 208 | 8 |

- ^{1} Rankings are as of October 3, 2022.

=== Other entrants ===
The following players received wildcards into the singles main draw:

- (United Kingdom) Jacob Fearnley
- (United States) Christian Langmo
- (United States) Aidan Mayo

The following player received entry into the singles main draw as a special exempt:

- (United States) Zachary Svajda

The following player received entry into the singles main draw as an alternate:

- (Italy) Giovanni Oradini

The following players received entry from the qualifying draw:

- (United States) Alafia Ayeni
- (Moldova) Alexander Cozbinov
- (Denmark) August Holmgren
- (United States) Alfredo Perez
- (United States) Sam Riffice
- (United States) Tennys Sandgren

The following player received entry as a lucky loser:

- (Tunisia) Malek Jaziri

== Champions ==
=== Singles ===
- (United States) Michael Mmoh def. (Canada) Gabriel Diallo 6–3, 6–2.

=== Doubles ===
- (United Kingdom) Julian Cash / (United Kingdom) Henry Patten def. (India) Anirudh Chandrasekar / (India) Vijay Sundar Prashanth 6–3, 6–1.
