= 2019 Fairfield Challenger =

- Date: 7–13 October
- Edition: 5th
- Surface: Hard
- Location: Fairfield, California, United States

Champions

Singles
- (Australia) Christopher O'Connell

Doubles
- (Barbados) Darian King / (Canada) Peter Polansky
← 2018 ·	Fairfield Challenger	· 2022 →

The 2019 Northbay Healthcare Men's Pro Championship was a professional tennis tournament played on hard courts. It was the fifth edition of the tournament which was part of the 2019 ATP Challenger Tour. It took place in Fairfield, California, United States between October 7 and October 13, 2019.

== Singles main-draw entrants ==
=== Seeds ===
Country	Player	Rank^{1}	Seed
USA	Steve Johnson	98	1
USA	Denis Kudla	106	2
~~USA~~	~~Marcos Giron~~	~~123~~	~~3~~
JPN	Taro Daniel	127	4
SLO	Blaž Rola	128	5
AUS	James Duckworth	149	6
ECU	Emilio Gómez	151	7
CAN	Peter Polansky	168	8
BAR	Darian King	169	9
ESP	Nicola Kuhn	178	10
~~USA~~	~~Thai-Son Kwiatkowski~~	~~188~~	~~11~~
AUS	Christopher O'Connell	193	12
USA	Mitchell Krueger	196	13
USA	Jack Sock	210	14
USA	Ernesto Escobedo	216	15
USA	Maxime Cressy	219	16
USA	Donald Young	238	17

- ^{1} Rankings are as of September 30, 2019.

=== Other entrants ===
The following players received wildcards into the singles main draw:

- (United States) Brandon Holt
- (United States) Steve Johnson
- (United States) Brandon Nakashima
- (United States) Alex Rybakov
- (United States) Zachary Svajda

The following player received entry into the singles main draw as an alternate:

- (United States) Strong Kirchheimer

The following players received entry from the qualifying draw:

- (United States) Felix Corwin
- (Netherlands) Sem Verbeek

The following player received entry as a lucky loser:

- (United States) Dennis Novikov

== Champions ==
=== Singles ===
- (Australia) Christopher O'Connell def. (United States) Steve Johnson 6–4, 6–4.

=== Doubles ===
- (Barbados) Darian King / (Canada) Peter Polansky def. (Sweden) André Göransson / (Netherlands) Sem Verbeek 6–4, 3–6, [12–10].
