= 2025 Fairfield Challenger =

- Date: 6–12 October
- Edition: 9th
- Surface: Hard
- Location: Fairfield, California, United States

Champions

Singles
- (Japan) Jay Dylan Friend

Doubles
- (Germany) Mats Rosenkranz / (Germany) Max Wiskandt
← 2024 ·	Fairfield Challenger	· 2026 →

The 2025 Fairfield Challenger was a professional tennis tournament played on hardcourts. It was the ninth edition of the tournament which was part of the 2025 ATP Challenger Tour. It took place in Fairfield, California, United States between October 6 and October 12, 2025.

== Singles main-draw entrants ==
=== Seeds ===
Country	Player	Rank^{1}	Seed
LBN	Benjamin Hassan	187	1
KAZ	Dmitry Popko	214	2
CZE	Marek Gengel	245	3
USA	Garrett Johns	294	4
JOR	Abdullah Shelbayh	302	5
GER	Mats Rosenkranz	315	6
AUS	Moerani Bouzige	320	7
USA	Michael Mmoh	321	8

- ^{1} Rankings are as of September 29, 2025.

=== Other entrants ===
The following players received wildcards into the singles main draw:

- (United States) Andrew Fenty
- (United States) Dominique Rolland
- (United States) Emon van Loben Sels

The following player received entry into the singles main draw using a protected ranking:

- (United States) Micah Braswell

The following player received entry into the singles main draw through the Junior Accelerator programme:

- (United States) Kaylan Bigun

The following player received entry into the singles main draw as an alternate:

- (United States) Cannon Kingsley

The following players received entry from the qualifying draw:

- (United States) Evan Bynoe
- (Japan) Jay Dylan Friend
- (Barbados) Darian King
- (Spain) Roger Pascual Ferrà
- (United States) Quinn Vandecasteele
- (Australia) Edward Winter

== Champions ==
=== Singles ===
- (Japan) Jay Dylan Friend def. (Australia) Edward Winter 6–7^{(3–7)}, 6–3, 6–2.

=== Doubles ===
- (Germany) Mats Rosenkranz / (Germany) Max Wiskandt def. (United States) Spencer Johnson / (United States) Wally Thayne 3–6, 7–5, [10–6].
