= 2015 Fairfield Challenger – Doubles =

Doubles
- 2015 Fairfield Challenger

Final
- Champions: (Sweden) Johan Brunström (Denmark) Frederik Nielsen
- Runners-up: (Australia) Carsten Ball (Germany) Dustin Brown
- Score: 6–3, 5–7, [10–5]

Events
Singles	Doubles
- Fairfield Challenger

This was the first edition of the tournament, Johan Brunström and Frederik Nielsen won the title defeating Carsten Ball and Dustin Brown in the final 6–3, 5–7, [10–5].

== Seeds ==
1. (Australia) Carsten Ball / (Germany) Dustin Brown (final)
2. (Sweden) Johan Brunström / (Denmark) Frederik Nielsen (champion)
3. (South Africa) Dean O'Brien / (South Africa) Ruan Roelofse (semifinals)
4. (United States) Mitchell Krueger / (United States) Tennys Sandgren (semifinals)

== Draw ==
Key

- Q = Qualifier
- WC = Wild card
- LL = Lucky loser
- Alt = Alternate
- ITF = ITF entry
- PR = Protected ranking
- SR = Special ranking
- SE = Special exempt
- JE = Junior exempt
- JR = Junior Accelerator Programme entrant
- CO = College Accelerator Programme entrant
- NG = Next Gen Accelerator Program entrant
- w/o = Walkover
- r = Retired
- d = Defaulted

First round
1	(Australia) C Ball (Germany) D Brown	6	6
(Slovenia) B Kavčič (Slovenia) G Žemlja	2	1
(Canada) F Dancevic (Switzerland) H Laaksonen	6	6
WC	(United States) Jean-Yves Aubone (United States) T Fritz	4	2
4	(United States) M Krueger (United States) T Sandgren	7	6
(Colombia) N Barrientos (Barbados) D King	5	4
WC	(United States) M Giron (United States) T Paul	3	2
PR	(Canada) P Polansky (Canada) P Bester	6	6
LL	(United States) Andrew Carter (Australia) Michael Kwong	3	4
(Uruguay) A Behar (Philippines) R Gonzales	6	6
WC	(United States) Jeremy Hunter Nicholas (United States) M Seeberger	3	4
3	(South Africa) D O'Brien (South Africa) R Roelofse	6	6
Q	(South Africa) Damon Gooch (New Zealand) B McLachlan	5	4
(United States) S Bangoura (New Zealand) J Statham	7	6
(Chinese Taipei) J Jung (United States) Connor Smith	4	2
2	(Sweden) J Brunström (Denmark) F Nielsen	6	6

Quarterfinals
1	(Australia) C Ball (Germany) D Brown	6	3	[10]
(Canada) F Dancevic (Switzerland) H Laaksonen	3	6	[6]
4	(United States) M Krueger (United States) T Sandgren	3	6	[11]
PR	(Canada) P Polansky (Canada) P Bester	6	4	[9]
(Uruguay) A Behar (Philippines) R Gonzales	6	3	[6]
3	(South Africa) D O'Brien (South Africa) R Roelofse	4	6	[10]
(United States) S Bangoura (New Zealand) J Statham	3	2
2	(Sweden) J Brunström (Denmark) F Nielsen	6	6

Semifinals
1	(Australia) C Ball (Germany) D Brown	3	6	[10]
4	(United States) M Krueger (United States) T Sandgren	6	3	[8]
3	(South Africa) D O'Brien (South Africa) R Roelofse	7^{9}	6^{5}	[4]
2	(Sweden) J Brunström (Denmark) F Nielsen	6^{7}	7^{7}	[10]

Final
1	(Australia) C Ball (Germany) D Brown	3	7	[5]
2	(Sweden) J Brunström (Denmark) F Nielsen	6	5	[10]
