= 2015 Fairfield Challenger – Singles =

Singles
- 2015 Fairfield Challenger

Final
- Champion: (United States) Taylor Fritz
- Runner-up: (Germany) Dustin Brown
- Score: 6–3, 6–4

Events
Singles	Doubles
- Fairfield Challenger

This was the first edition of the tournament, Taylor Fritz won the title beating Dustin Brown in the final 6–3, 6–4.

== Seeds ==
1. (United States) Tim Smyczek (second round)
2. (United States) Ryan Harrison (first round)
3. (Germany) Dustin Brown (final)
4. (Slovenia) Blaž Rola (semifinals)
5. (United States) Jared Donaldson (quarterfinals)
6. (Slovenia) Blaž Kavčič (quarterfinals)
7. (Germany) Daniel Brands (quarterfinals)
8. (Republic of Ireland) James McGee (second round)

== Draw ==
Key

- Q = Qualifier
- WC = Wild card
- LL = Lucky loser
- Alt = Alternate
- ITF = ITF entry
- PR = Protected ranking
- SR = Special ranking
- SE = Special exempt
- JE = Junior exempt
- JR = Junior Accelerator Programme entrant
- CO = College Accelerator Programme entrant
- NG = Next Gen Accelerator Program entrant
- w/o = Walkover
- r = Retired
- d = Defaulted

=== Finals ===
Semifinals
SE	(United States) Taylor Fritz	6	6
4	(Slovenia) Blaž Rola	3	3
3	(Germany) Dustin Brown	7	3	6
(United States) Frances Tiafoe	5	6	2

Final
SE	(United States) Taylor Fritz	6	6
3	(Germany) Dustin Brown	3	4

=== Top half ===
First round
1	(United States) T Smyczek	6^{5}	6	6
(United States) M Krueger	7^{7}	2	3
SE	(United States) T Fritz	6	6
Q	(Switzerland) H Laaksonen	2	3
Q	(United States) S Bangoura	4	6^{3}
(Chinese Taipei) J Jung	6	7^{7}
WC	(United States) Connor Hance	0	1
6	(Slovenia) B Kavčič	6	6
4	(Slovenia) B Rola	4	6	6
(United States) A Sarkissian	6	3	0
(United Kingdom) L Broady	6	6
(Slovenia) G Žemlja	4	1
(Canada) F Dancevic	4	7^{7}	7^{7}
WC	(United States) M Giron	6	6^{2}	6^{2}
(Canada) P Bester	2	3
5	(United States) J Donaldson	6	6

Second round
1	(United States) T Smyczek	2	3
SE	(United States) T Fritz	6	6
(Chinese Taipei) J Jung	5	3
6	(Slovenia) B Kavčič	7	6
4	(Slovenia) B Rola	6	3	6
(United Kingdom) L Broady	1	6	3
(Canada) F Dancevic	6	2	3
5	(United States) J Donaldson	2	6	6

Quarterfinals
SE	(United States) T Fritz	6	6
6	(Slovenia) B Kavčič	4	1
4	(Slovenia) B Rola	6	6
5	(United States) J Donaldson	1	2

Semifinals
SE	(United States) T Fritz	6	6
4	(Slovenia) B Rola	3	3

=== Bottom half ===
First round
7	(Germany) D Brands	6	6
WC	(Netherlands) S Verbeek	4	0
Q	(United States) A Kuznetsov	6	7^{8}
(Colombia) N Barrientos	4	6^{6}
(France) Q Halys	4	6^{5}
WC	(United States) T Paul	6	7^{7}
(United States) Connor Smith	0	5
3	(Germany) D Brown	6	7
8	(Republic of Ireland) J McGee	7^{7}	6
Alt	(Denmark) F Nielsen	6^{4}	3
(United States) F Tiafoe	6	6
Alt	(Czech Republic) M Michalička	2	3
Q	(Canada) P Polansky	6	6
(United States) T Sandgren	4	1
(Barbados) D King	6	7
2	(United States) R Harrison	4	5

Second round
7	(Germany) D Brands	7	6^{4}	7^{9}
Q	(United States) A Kuznetsov	5	7^{7}	6^{7}
WC	(United States) T Paul	2	6^{5}
3	(Germany) D Brown	6	7^{7}
8	(Republic of Ireland) J McGee	3	5
(United States) F Tiafoe	6	7
Q	(Canada) P Polansky	6	3	2
(Barbados) D King	2	6	6

Quarterfinals
7	(Germany) D Brands	6^{5}	6	1
3	(Germany) D Brown	7^{7}	3	6
(United States) F Tiafoe	6	6^{6}	6
(Barbados) D King	4	7^{8}	4

Semifinals
3	(Germany) D Brown	7	3	6
(United States) F Tiafoe	5	6	2
