= 2019 Fairfield Challenger – Singles =

Singles
- 2019 Fairfield Challenger

Final
- Champion: (Australia) Christopher O'Connell
- Runner-up: (United States) Steve Johnson
- Score: 6–4, 6–4

Events
Singles	Doubles
- Fairfield Challenger

Bjorn Fratangelo was the defending champion but chose not to defend his title.

Christopher O'Connell won the title after defeating Steve Johnson 6–4, 6–4 in the final.

== Seeds ==
All seeds receive a bye into the second round.

1. (United States) Steve Johnson (final)
2. (United States) Denis Kudla (third round)
3. (United States) Marcos Giron (withdrew)
4. (Japan) Taro Daniel (quarterfinals)
5. (Slovenia) Blaž Rola (third round)
6. (Australia) James Duckworth (third round)
7. (Ecuador) Emilio Gómez (third round)
8. (Canada) Peter Polansky (quarterfinals)
9. (Barbados) Darian King (quarterfinals)
10. (Spain) Nicola Kuhn (third round)
11. (United States) Thai-Son Kwiatkowski (withdrew)
12. (Australia) Christopher O'Connell (champion)
13. (United States) Mitchell Krueger (second round)
14. (United States) Jack Sock (second round)
15. (United States) Ernesto Escobedo (second round)
16. (United States) Maxime Cressy (third round)
17. (United States) Donald Young (third round)

== Draw ==
Key

- Q = Qualifier
- WC = Wild card
- LL = Lucky loser
- Alt = Alternate
- ITF = ITF entry
- PR = Protected ranking
- SR = Special ranking
- SE = Special exempt
- JE = Junior exempt
- JR = Junior Accelerator Programme entrant
- CO = College Accelerator Programme entrant
- NG = Next Gen Accelerator Program entrant
- w/o = Walkover
- r = Retired
- d = Defaulted

=== Finals ===
Quarterfinals
1/WC	(United States) Steve Johnson	6	6
9	(Barbados) Darian King	1	1
4	(Japan) Taro Daniel	6^{5}	6^{5}
WC	(United States) Brandon Nakashima	7^{7}	7^{7}
12	(Australia) Christopher O'Connell	6	6
(United Kingdom) Jack Draper	2	3
8	(Canada) Peter Polansky	3	6^{10}
(United States) Kevin King	6	7^{12}

Semifinals
1/WC	(United States) Steve Johnson	3	6	6
WC	(United States) Brandon Nakashima	6	1	2
12	(Australia) Christopher O'Connell	6	7^{7}
(United States) Kevin King	3	6^{2}

Final
1/WC	(United States) Steve Johnson	4	4
12	(Australia) Christopher O'Connell	6	6

=== Top half ===
==== Section 1 ====
First round
(United States) M Mmoh	6	6
(United States) E Zhu	4	3
(United States) E King	6^{5}	6	6
Alt	(United States) S Kirchheimer	7^{7}	3	4
(United States) S Korda	6	7^{7}
(Germany) S Fanselow	4	6^{4}
(Northern Mariana Islands) C Sinclair	7^{8}	6^{4}	4
(Argentina) A Velotti	6^{6}	7^{7}	6

Second round
1/WC	(United States) S Johnson	7^{7}	6
(United States) M Mmoh	6^{4}	4
(United States) E King	7	5	7^{7}
13	(United States) M Krueger	5	7	6^{4}
9	(Barbados) D King	5	6	7
(United States) S Korda	7	0	5
(Argentina) A Velotti	1	4
5	(Slovenia) B Rola	6	6

Third round
1/WC	(United States) S Johnson	6	6
(United States) E King	3	2
9	(Barbados) D King	6	6
5	(Slovenia) B Rola	4	2

Quarterfinals
1/WC	(United States) S Johnson	6	6
9	(Barbados) D King	1	1

==== Section 2 ====
First round
WC	(United States) B Holt	6	6
(United States) C Altamirano	2	2
(United States) Roy Smith	6^{4}	4
(United States) JC Aragone	7^{7}	6
WC	(United States) B Nakashima	6	6
(United States) U Blanch	2	4
Q	(United States) Felix Corwin	6	6
(Canada) F Peliwo	1	3

Second round
4	(Japan) T Daniel	6	6
WC	(United States) B Holt	1	4
(United States) JC Aragone	6^{4}	2
16	(United States) M Cressy	7^{7}	6
LL	(United States) D Novikov	2	4
WC	(United States) B Nakashima	6	6
Q	(United States) F Corwin	7^{7}	5	0
6	(Australia) J Duckworth	6^{5}	7	6

Third round
4	(Japan) T Daniel	1	7^{7}	6
16	(United States) M Cressy	6	6^{2}	3
WC	(United States) B Nakashima	7^{7}	7
6	(Australia) J Duckworth	6^{5}	5

Quarterfinals
4	(Japan) T Daniel	6^{5}	6^{5}
WC	(United States) B Nakashima	7^{7}	7^{7}

=== Bottom half ===
==== Section 3 ====
First round
(Colombia) N Mejía	2	6	6
(Israel) E Leshem	6	1	4
(Ecuador) R Quiroz	6	6
(Germany) Lucas Gerch	3	3
(United Kingdom) J Draper	6	2	7
WC	(United States) A Rybakov	1	6	5
(United Kingdom) R Peniston	2	3
(United States) A Sarkissian	6	6

Second round
7	(Ecuador) E Gómez	6	6
(Colombia) N Mejía	4	3
(Ecuador) R Quiroz	3	4
12	(Australia) C O'Connell	6	6
14	(United States) J Sock	6	6^{2}	3
(United Kingdom) J Draper	3	7^{7}	6
(United States) A Sarkissian	6	4	0
17	(United States) D Young	2	6	6

Third round
7	(Ecuador) E Gómez	1	2
12	(Australia) C O'Connell	6	6
(United Kingdom) J Draper	6	7^{7}
17	(United States) D Young	3	6^{1}

Quarterfinals
12	(Australia) C O'Connell	6	6
(United Kingdom) J Draper	2	3

==== Section 4 ====
First round
(United States) A Ritschard	6	6
(United States) S Bangoura	4	4
Q	(Netherlands) S Verbeek	3	3
(Greece) M Pervolarakis	6	6
(United States) K King	6	6
(Turkey) A Çelikbilek	4	3
WC	(United States) Z Svajda	7^{7}	6
(United States) Mi Redlicki	6^{5}	2

Second round
8	(Canada) P Polansky	6	5	6
(United States) A Ritschard	3	7	4
(Greece) M Pervolarakis	4	6	0
10	(Spain) N Kuhn	6	2	6
15	(United States) E Escobedo	5	4
(United States) K King	7	6
WC	(United States) Z Svajda	1	6	4
2	(United States) D Kudla	6	3	6

Third round
8	(Canada) P Polansky	6	6
10	(Spain) N Kuhn	4	4
(United States) K King	6	6
2	(United States) D Kudla	2	3

Quarterfinals
8	(Canada) P Polansky	3	6^{10}
(United States) K King	6	7^{12}
