= 2015 Fairfield Challenger =

- Date: 12–18 October
- Edition: 1st
- Surface: Hard
- Location: Fairfield, California, United States

Champions

Singles
- (United States) Taylor Fritz

Doubles
- (Sweden) Johan Brunström / (Denmark) Frederik Nielsen
- Fairfield Challenger

The 2015 Fairfield Challenger was a professional tennis tournament played on hard courts. It was the first edition of the tournament which was part of the 2015 ATP Challenger Tour. It took place in Fairfield, California, United States between October 12 and October 18, 2015.

== Singles main-draw entrants ==
=== Seeds ===
Country	Player	Rank^{1}	Seed
USA	Tim Smyczek	98	1
USA	Ryan Harrison	104	2
GER	Dustin Brown	108	4
SLO	Blaž Rola	137	4
USA	Jared Donaldson	153	5
SLO	Blaž Kavčič	162	6
GER	Daniel Brands	177	7
IRL	James McGee	186	8

- ^{1} Rankings are as of October 5, 2015.

=== Other entrants ===
The following players received wildcards into the singles main draw:

- (United States) Connor Hance
- (United States) Marcos Giron
- (Netherlands) Sem Verbeek
- (United States) Tommy Paul

The following player received entry using a special exemption:

- (United States) Taylor Fritz

The following players received entry into the singles main draw as alternates:

- (Denmark) Frederik Nielsen
- (Czech Republic) Marek Michalička

The following players received entry from the qualifying draw:

- (Switzerland) Henri Laaksonen
- (United States) Sekou Bangoura
- (United States) Alex Kuznetsov
- (Canada) Peter Polansky

== Champions ==
=== Singles ===
- (United States) Taylor Fritz def. (Germany) Dustin Brown, 6–3, 6–4.

=== Doubles ===
- (Sweden) Johan Brunström / (Denmark) Frederik Nielsen def. (Australia) Carsten Ball / (Germany) Dustin Brown, 6–3, 5–7, [10–5].
