= 2017 Fairfield Challenger – Doubles =

Doubles
- 2017 Fairfield Challenger

Final
- Champions: (United Kingdom) Luke Bambridge (Republic of Ireland) David O'Hare
- Runners-up: (Egypt) Akram El Sallaly (Brazil) Bernardo Oliveira
- Score: 6–4, 6–2

Events
Singles	Doubles
- Fairfield Challenger

Brian Baker and Mackenzie McDonald were the defending champions but only McDonald chose to defend his title, partnering Miķelis Lībietis. McDonald lost in the semifinals to Akram El Sallaly and Bernardo Oliveira.

Luke Bambridge and David O'Hare won the title after defeating El Sallaly and Oliveira 6–4, 6–2 in the final.

== Seeds ==
1. (United Kingdom) Neal Skupski / (Australia) John-Patrick Smith (quarterfinals)
2. (United Kingdom) Luke Bambridge / (Republic of Ireland) David O'Hare (champions)
3. (Australia) Steven de Waard / (South Africa) Ruan Roelofse (first round)
4. (United Kingdom) Brydan Klein / (United Kingdom) Joe Salisbury (quarterfinals)

== Draw ==
Key

- Q = Qualifier
- WC = Wild card
- LL = Lucky loser
- Alt = Alternate
- ITF = ITF entry
- PR = Protected ranking
- SR = Special ranking
- SE = Special exempt
- JE = Junior exempt
- JR = Junior Accelerator Programme entrant
- CO = College Accelerator Programme entrant
- NG = Next Gen Accelerator Program entrant
- w/o = Walkover
- r = Retired
- d = Defaulted

First round
1	(United Kingdom) N Skupski (Australia) J-P Smith	6	6
(United States) S Bangoura (United States) E King	4	3
(Canada) F Auger-Aliassime (Canada) B Schnur
(Latvia) M Lībietis (United States) M McDonald	w/o
3	(Australia) S de Waard (South Africa) R Roelofse	6	3	[5]
Q	(United Kingdom) L Broady (United Kingdom) J Clarke	4	6	[10]
WC	(United States) Mousheg Hovhannisyan (United States) Mark Stewart Meyer	6^{5}	3
WC	(Egypt) Akram El Sallaly (Brazil) Bernardo Oliveira	7^{7}	6
(United States) B Fratangelo (Australia) S Groth	6	3	[10]
PR	(Canada) F Dancevic (Serbia) N Milojević	3	6	[4]
(Mexico) H Hach Verdugo (India) R Ramanathan	2	5
4	(United Kingdom) B Klein (United Kingdom) J Salisbury	6	7
WC	(United States) T Fawcett (United States) Timothy Sah	7^{7}	3	[5]
(Australia) Jarryd Chaplin (United States) T Sandgren	6^{5}	6	[10]
(United States) B Klahn (United States) J Withrow	6^{3}	6	[7]
2	(United Kingdom) L Bambridge (Republic of Ireland) D O'Hare	7^{7}	4	[10]

Quarterfinals
1	(United Kingdom) N Skupski (Australia) J-P Smith	6^{3}	5
(Latvia) M Lībietis (United States) M McDonald	7^{7}	7
Q	(United Kingdom) L Broady (United Kingdom) J Clarke	3	3
WC	(Egypt) A El Sallaly (Brazil) B Oliveira	6	6
(United States) B Fratangelo (Australia) S Groth	4	6	[11]
4	(United Kingdom) B Klein (United Kingdom) J Salisbury	6	2	[9]
(Australia) J Chaplin (United States) T Sandgren	3	6	[7]
2	(United Kingdom) L Bambridge (Republic of Ireland) D O'Hare	6	1	[10]

Semifinals
(Latvia) M Lībietis (United States) M McDonald	6^{5}	6	[8]
WC	(Egypt) A El Sallaly (Brazil) B Oliveira	7^{7}	4	[10]
(United States) B Fratangelo (Australia) S Groth	6	5	[4]
2	(United Kingdom) L Bambridge (Republic of Ireland) D O'Hare	2	7	[10]

Final
WC	(Egypt) A El Sallaly (Brazil) B Oliveira	4	2
2	(United Kingdom) L Bambridge (Republic of Ireland) D O'Hare	6	6
