= 2022 Fairfield Challenger – Doubles =

Doubles
- 2022 Fairfield Challenger

Final
- Champions: (United Kingdom) Julian Cash (United Kingdom) Henry Patten
- Runners-up: (India) Anirudh Chandrasekar (India) Vijay Sundar Prashanth
- Score: 6–3, 6–1

Events
Singles	Doubles
- Fairfield Challenger

Darian King and Peter Polansky were the defending champions but chose not to defend their title.

Julian Cash and Henry Patten won the title after defeating Anirudh Chandrasekar and Vijay Sundar Prashanth 6–3, 6–1 in the final.

== Seeds ==
1. (United Kingdom) Julian Cash / (United Kingdom) Henry Patten (champions)
2. (Australia) Andrew Harris / (Australia) Luke Saville (quarterfinals)
3. (France) Enzo Couacaud / (United States) Reese Stalder (first round)
4. (Tunisia) Malek Jaziri / (Greece) Michail Pervolarakis (quarterfinals)

== Draw ==
Key

- Q = Qualifier
- WC = Wild card
- LL = Lucky loser
- Alt = Alternate
- ITF = ITF entry
- PR = Protected ranking
- SR = Special ranking
- SE = Special exempt
- JE = Junior exempt
- JR = Junior Accelerator Programme entrant
- CO = College Accelerator Programme entrant
- NG = Next Gen Accelerator Program entrant
- w/o = Walkover
- r = Retired
- d = Defaulted

First round
1	(United Kingdom) J Cash (United Kingdom) H Patten	6	6
(United States) E King (United States) M Krueger	3	4
WC	(Japan) Yuta Kikuchi (Denmark) CE Overbeck	4	2
(United Kingdom) C Broom (Germany) C Frantzen	6	6
3	(France) E Couacaud (United States) R Stalder	6^{5}	5
PR	(Republic of Ireland) S Carr (Moldova) A Cozbinov	7^{7}	7
(United States) A Ayeni (Canada) G Diallo	6^{5}	3
(United States) M Damm (United States) Christian Langmo	7^{7}	6
(India) A Chandrasekar (India) VS Prashanth	7	6
(Estonia) D Glinka (Estonia) Karl Kiur Saar	5	3
(Zimbabwe) B Lock (Zimbabwe) CJ Lock	5	2
4	(Tunisia) M Jaziri (Greece) M Pervolarakis	7	6
(Switzerland) L Riedi (Monaco) V Vacherot	4	3
(United States) Ezekiel Clark (United States) A Perez	6	6
(Germany) S Fanselow (Israel) E Leshem	4	4
2	(Australia) A Harris (Australia) L Saville	6	6

Quarterfinals
1	(United Kingdom) J Cash (United Kingdom) H Patten	6	7
(United Kingdom) C Broom (Germany) C Frantzen	1	5
PR	(Republic of Ireland) S Carr (Moldova) A Cozbinov	2	3
(United States) M Damm (United States) C Langmo	6	6
(India) A Chandrasekar (India) VS Prashanth	6	7
4	(Tunisia) M Jaziri (Greece) M Pervolarakis	4	5
(United States) E Clark (United States) A Perez	7^{7}	3	[10]
2	(Australia) A Harris (Australia) L Saville	6^{0}	6	[2]

Semifinals
1	(United Kingdom) J Cash (United Kingdom) H Patten	6	3	[10]
(United States) M Damm (United States) C Langmo	4	6	[6]
(India) A Chandrasekar (India) VS Prashanth	6	7
(United States) E Clark (United States) A Perez	1	5

Final
1	(United Kingdom) J Cash (United Kingdom) H Patten	6	6
(India) A Chandrasekar (India) VS Prashanth	3	1
