= 2017 Fairfield Challenger =

- Date: 9–15 October
- Edition: 3rd
- Surface: Hard
- Location: Fairfield, California, United States

Champions

Singles
- (United States) Mackenzie McDonald

Doubles
- (United Kingdom) Luke Bambridge / (Republic of Ireland) David O'Hare
- Fairfield Challenger

The 2017 Fairfield Challenger was a professional tennis tournament played on hard courts. It was the third edition of the tournament which was part of the 2017 ATP Challenger Tour. It took place in Fairfield, California, United States between October 9 and October 15, 2017.

== Singles main-draw entrants ==
=== Seeds ===
Country	Player	Rank^{1}	Seed
USA	Ernesto Escobedo	93	1
USA	Tennys Sandgren	97	2
USA	Bjorn Fratangelo	117	3
GER	Maximilian Marterer	132	4
~~GBR~~	~~Cameron Norrie~~	~~136~~	~~5~~
USA	Stefan Kozlov	144	6
IND	Ramkumar Ramanathan	149	7
SRB	Nikola Milojević	150	8
USA	Michael Mmoh	156	9

- ^{1} Rankings are as of October 2, 2017.

=== Other entrants ===
The following players received wildcards into the singles main draw:

- (Argentina) Axel Geller
- (United States) Evan King
- (United States) Alexander Sarkissian

The following player received entry into the singles main draw using a protected ranking:

- (Canada) Frank Dancevic

The following players received entry into the singles main draw as special exempts:

- (United States) Kevin King
- (United States) Bradley Klahn

The following players received entry from the qualifying draw:

- (Germany) Sebastian Fanselow
- (Australia) Christopher O'Connell
- (South Africa) Ruan Roelofse
- (Czech Republic) Jan Šátral

The following players received entry as lucky losers:

- (United States) Sekou Bangoura
- (Colombia) Alejandro González
- (United Kingdom) Alexander Ward

== Champions ==
=== Singles ===
- (United States) Mackenzie McDonald def. (United States) Bradley Klahn 6–4, 6–2.

=== Doubles ===
- (United Kingdom) Luke Bambridge / (Republic of Ireland) David O'Hare def. (Egypt) Akram El Sallaly / (Brazil) Bernardo Oliveira 6–4, 6–2.
