= 2024 Fairfield Challenger – Doubles =

Doubles
- 2024 Fairfield Challenger

Final
- Champions: (United States) Ryan Seggerman (United States) Patrik Trhac
- Runners-up: (Romania) Gabi Adrian Boitan (United States) Bruno Kuzuhara
- Score: 6–2, 3–6, [10–5]

Events
Singles	Doubles
- Fairfield Challenger

Evan King and Reese Stalder were the defending champions but chose not to defend their title.

Ryan Seggerman and Patrik Trhac won the title after defeating Gabi Adrian Boitan and Bruno Kuzuhara 6–2, 3–6, [10–5] in the final.

== Seeds ==
1. (United States) Ryan Seggerman / (United States) Patrik Trhac (champions)
2. (Australia) Calum Puttergill / (Australia) Luke Saville (first round)
3. (United States) Trey Hilderbrand / (United States) Alex Lawson (semifinals)
4. (New Zealand) Marcus Daniell / (Mexico) Hans Hach Verdugo (quarterfinals)

== Draw ==
Key

- Q = Qualifier
- WC = Wild card
- LL = Lucky loser
- Alt = Alternate
- ITF = ITF entry
- PR = Protected ranking
- SR = Special ranking
- SE = Special exempt
- JE = Junior exempt
- JR = Junior Accelerator Programme entrant
- CO = College Accelerator Programme entrant
- NG = Next Gen Accelerator Program entrant
- w/o = Walkover
- r = Retired
- d = Defaulted

=== Draw ===
First round
1	(United States) R Seggerman (United States) P Trhac	6	6
(United States) T Kodat (United States) A Martin	2	2
WC	(United Kingdom) M Basing (United States) Harsh Parikh	2	4
(Kazakhstan) D Popko; A Zakharov	6	6
3	(United States) T Hilderbrand (United States) A Lawson	6	6
(Brazil) Gabriel Roveri Sidney (United States) Tennyson Whiting	1	1
WC	(United States) Zachary Fuchs (United States) Wally Thayne	6	7^{7}
(Australia) P Harper (United States) M Kiger	3	6^{5}
(Venezuela) G Oliveira (Canada) K Stevenson	7^{7}	5	[12]
(Australia) K Pearson (United States) J Sheehy	6^{5}	7	[10]
(United States) R Cash (United States) JJ Tracy	3	4
4	(New Zealand) M Daniell (Mexico) H Hach Verdugo	6	6
(United States) Christian Langmo (Australia) B Tomic	3	3
(Romania) GA Boitan (United States) B Kuzuhara	6	6
(New Zealand) K Pannu (United States) K Smith	6	7
2	(Australia) C Puttergill (Australia) L Saville	4	5

Quarterfinals
1	(United States) R Seggerman (United States) P Trhac	1	7^{7}	[10]
(Kazakhstan) D Popko; A Zakharov	6	6^{5}	[5]
3	(United States) T Hilderbrand (United States) A Lawson	6	6
WC	(United States) Z Fuchs (United States) W Thayne	1	1
(Venezuela) G Oliveira (Canada) K Stevenson	6	6
4	(New Zealand) M Daniell (Mexico) H Hach Verdugo	3	4
(Romania) GA Boitan (United States) B Kuzuhara	2	6	[12]
(New Zealand) K Pannu (United States) K Smith	6	4	[10]

Semifinals
1	(United States) R Seggerman (United States) P Trhac	6	7^{7}
3	(United States) T Hilderbrand (United States) A Lawson	4	6^{3}
(Venezuela) G Oliveira (Canada) K Stevenson	2	5
(Romania) GA Boitan (United States) B Kuzuhara	6	7

Final
1	(United States) R Seggerman (United States) P Trhac	6	3	[10]
(Romania) GA Boitan (United States) B Kuzuhara	2	6	[5]
