= 2016 Fairfield Challenger =

- Date: 10–16 October
- Edition: 2nd
- Surface: Hard
- Location: Fairfield, California, United States

Champions

Singles
- (Colombia) Santiago Giraldo

Doubles
- (United States) Brian Baker / (United States) Mackenzie McDonald
- Fairfield Challenger

The 2016 Fairfield Challenger was a professional tennis tournament played on hard courts. It was the second edition of the tournament which was part of the 2016 ATP Challenger Tour. It took place in Fairfield, California, United States between October 10 and October 16, 2016.

== Singles main-draw entrants ==
=== Seeds ===
| Country | Player | Rank^{1} | Seed |
|---|---|---|---|
| USA | Frances Tiafoe | 117 | 1 |
| COL | Santiago Giraldo | 127 | 2 |
| USA | Tim Smyczek | 134 | 4 |
| BAR | Darian King | 135 | 4 |
| ITA | Alessandro Giannessi | 144 | 5 |
| USA | Dennis Novikov | 147 | 6 |
| SLO | Grega Žemlja | 162 | 7 |
| GER | Maximilian Marterer | 167 | 8 |

- ^{1} Rankings are as of October 3, 2016.

=== Other entrants ===
The following players received wildcards into the singles main draw:

- (United States) Reilly Opelka
- (United States) Tom Fawcett
- (United States) Keegan Smith
- (United States) Brian Baker

The following players received entry using special exemptions:

- (United States) Michael Mmoh
- (United States) Mackenzie McDonald

The following players received entry from the qualifying draw:

- (United Kingdom) Brydan Klein
- (Chile) Hans Podlipnik
- (United States) Dennis Nevolo
- (United Kingdom) Cameron Norrie

== Champions ==
=== Singles ===
- (Colombia) Santiago Giraldo def. (France) Quentin Halys, 4–6, 6–4, 6–2.

=== Doubles ===
- (United States) Brian Baker / (United States) Mackenzie McDonald def. (United States) Sekou Bangoura / (United States) Eric Quigley, 6–3, 6–4.
