= 2019 Fairfield Challenger – Doubles =

Doubles
- 2019 Fairfield Challenger

Final
- Champions: (Barbados) Darian King (Canada) Peter Polansky
- Runners-up: (Sweden) André Göransson (Netherlands) Sem Verbeek
- Score: 6–4, 3–6, [12–10]

Events
Singles	Doubles
- Fairfield Challenger

Sanchai Ratiwatana and Christopher Rungkat were the defending champions but chose not to defend their title.

Darian King and Peter Polansky won the title after defeating André Göransson and Sem Verbeek 6–4, 3–6, [12–10] in the final.

== Seeds ==
1. (United States) Robert Galloway / (Venezuela) Roberto Maytín (first round)
2. (United States) Evan King / (United States) Hunter Reese (quarterfinals)
3. (Mexico) Santiago González / (Philippines) Treat Huey (quarterfinals, withdrew)
4. (Sweden) André Göransson / (Netherlands) Sem Verbeek (final)

== Draw ==
Key

- Q = Qualifier
- WC = Wild card
- LL = Lucky loser
- Alt = Alternate
- ITF = ITF entry
- PR = Protected ranking
- SR = Special ranking
- SE = Special exempt
- JE = Junior exempt
- JR = Junior Accelerator Programme entrant
- CO = College Accelerator Programme entrant
- NG = Next Gen Accelerator Program entrant
- w/o = Walkover
- r = Retired
- d = Defaulted

First round
1	(United States) R Galloway (Venezuela) R Maytín	6	4	[3]
(United States) J Cerretani (United States) K Lovett	2	6	[10]
WC	(United States) S Bangoura (United States) M Mmoh	6	6^{4}	[7]
WC	(United States) D Baughman (United States) B Holt	4	7^{7}	[10]
4	(Sweden) A Göransson (Netherlands) S Verbeek	6	6
(United States) D Kudla (Ecuador) R Quiroz	0	4
(United States) JC Aragone (United States) D Young	6	4	[10]
(United States) N Pasha (United States) M Schnur	3	6	[12]
(Barbados) D King (Canada) P Polansky	7^{7}	6
WC	(United States) B Nakashima (United States) A Ritschard	6^{4}	4
(United States) M Krueger (United States) A Lawson	3	4
3	(Mexico) S González (Philippines) T Huey	6	6
(Mexico) H Hach Verdugo (United States) D Novikov	6	7^{7}
(United States) JP Fruttero (Slovenia) B Rola	1	6^{4}
(United States) Ma Redlicki (United States) J Withrow	6^{8}	4
2	(United States) E King (United States) H Reese	7^{10}	6

Quarterfinals
(United States) J Cerretani (United States) K Lovett	2	6	[6]
WC	(United States) D Baughman (United States) B Holt	6	4	[10]
4	(Sweden) A Göransson (Netherlands) S Verbeek	3	6	[10]
(United States) N Pasha (United States) M Schnur	6	4	[6]
(Barbados) D King (Canada) P Polansky	w/o
3	(Mexico) S González (Philippines) T Huey
(Mexico) H Hach Verdugo (United States) D Novikov	7^{7}	6^{2}	[10]
2	(United States) E King (United States) H Reese	6^{4}	7^{7}	[4]

Semifinals
WC	(United States) D Baughman (United States) B Holt	6^{2}	3
4	(Sweden) A Göransson (Netherlands) S Verbeek	7^{7}	6
(Barbados) D King (Canada) P Polansky	2	6	[10]
(Mexico) H Hach Verdugo (United States) D Novikov	6	4	[4]

Final
4	(Sweden) A Göransson (Netherlands) S Verbeek	4	6	[10]
(Barbados) D King (Canada) P Polansky	6	3	[12]
