= 2024 Fairfield Challenger =

- Date: 6–13 October
- Edition: 8th
- Surface: Hard
- Location: Fairfield, California, United States

Champions

Singles
- (United States) Learner Tien

Doubles
- (United States) Ryan Seggerman / (United States) Patrik Trhac
- Fairfield Challenger

The 2024 Fairfield Pro Tennis Championship was a professional tennis tournament played on hardcourts. It was the eighth edition of the tournament which was part of the 2024 ATP Challenger Tour. It took place in Fairfield, California, United States between October 6 and October 13, 2024.

== Singles main-draw entrants ==
=== Seeds ===
Country	Player	Rank^{1}	Seed
USA	Learner Tien	148	1
AUS	Tristan Schoolkate	169	2
USA	J. J. Wolf	171	3
KAZ	Dmitry Popko	175	4
USA	Patrick Kypson	184	5
USA	Brandon Holt	206	6
AUS	Bernard Tomic	233	7
USA	Ethan Quinn	235	8

- ^{1} Rankings are as of September 30, 2024.

=== Other entrants ===
The following players received wildcards into the singles main draw:

- (Denmark) Carl Emil Overbeck
- (United States) Ryan Seggerman
- (United States) Eliot Spizzirri

The following players received entry into the singles main draw as alternates:

- (United States) Bruno Kuzuhara
- (New Zealand) Kiranpal Pannu

The following players received entry from the qualifying draw:

- (United Kingdom) Max Basing
- (United States) Micah Braswell
- (United States) Murphy Cassone
- (United States) Trey Hilderbrand
- (United States) Rudy Quan
- (Germany) Max Wiskandt

== Champions ==
=== Singles ===
- (United States) Learner Tien def. (Australia) Bernard Tomic 6–0, 6–1.

=== Doubles ===
- (United States) Ryan Seggerman / (United States) Patrik Trhac def. (Romania) Gabi Adrian Boitan / (United States) Bruno Kuzuhara 6–2, 3–6, [10–5].
