= Christopher O'Connell =

Australian tennis player (born 1994)

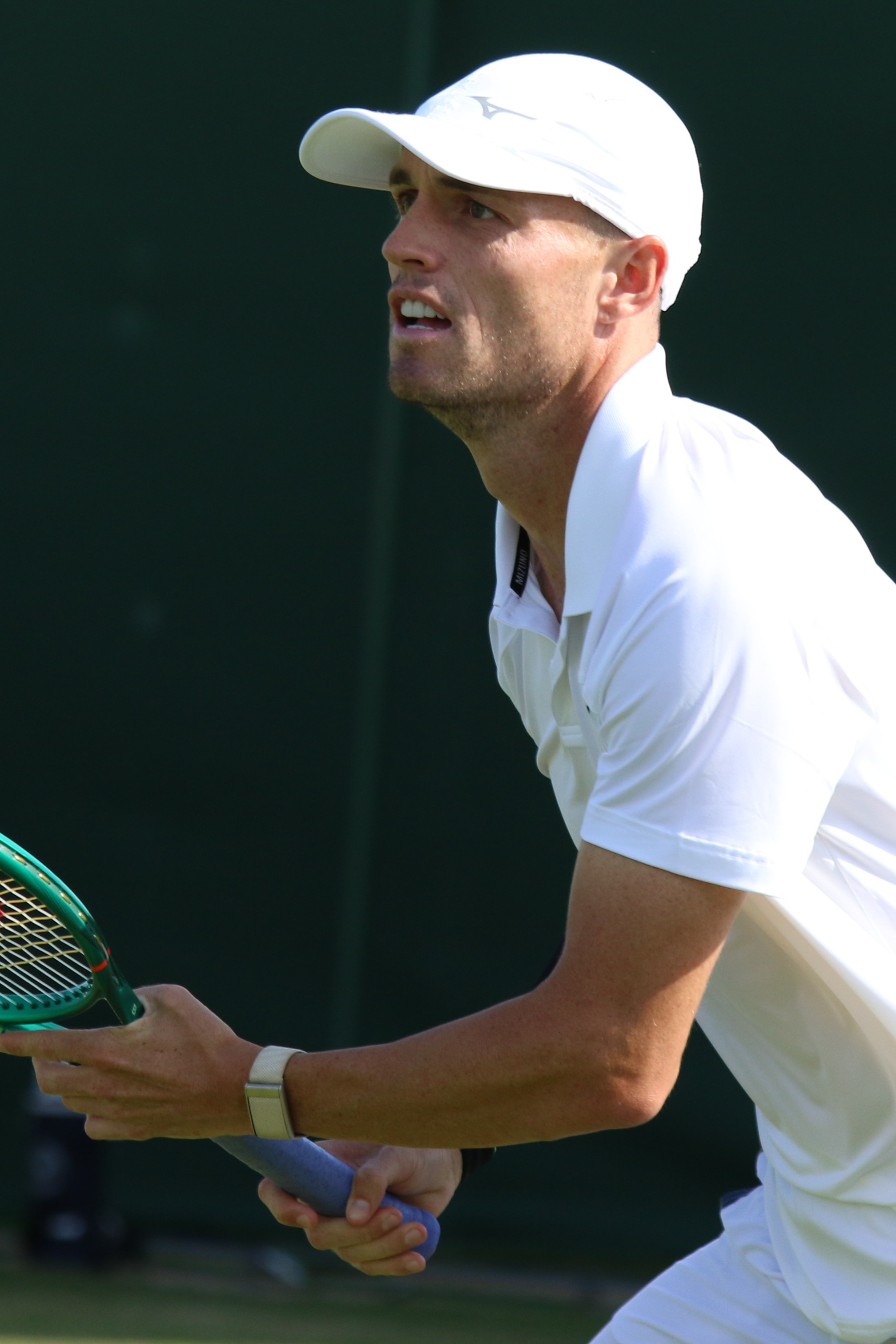
- O'Connell at the 2026 Wimbledon Championships
- Country (sports): Australia
- Residence: Sydney, Australia
- Born: 3 June 1994 (age 32) Sydney, Australia
- Height: 1.83 m (6 ft 0 in)
- Turned pro: 2011
- Plays: Right-handed (one-handed backhand)
- Coach: Ian O'Connell, Jordan Thompson (Jul 2026–)
- Prize money: US $4,449,437

Singles
- Career record: 63–98
- Career titles: 0
- Highest ranking: No. 53 (11 September 2023)
- Current ranking: No. 129 (10 August 2026)

Grand Slam singles results
- Australian Open: 3R (2022)
- French Open: 1R (2021, 2022, 2023, 2025)
- Wimbledon: 3R (2023)
- US Open: 3R (2024)

Doubles
- Career record: 3–13
- Career titles: 0
- Highest ranking: No. 460 (21 March 2022)

Grand Slam doubles results
- Australian Open: 3R (2022)
- Wimbledon: 1R (2023)
- US Open: 1R (2023)
- Last updated on: 20 August 2026.

Christopher O'Connell (born 3 June 1994) is an Australian professional tennis player. He has a career-high ATP singles ranking of world No. 53, achieved on 11 September 2023 and a doubles ranking of No. 460, reached on 21 March 2022.

== Early life and background ==
O'Connell grew up on the Northern Beaches of Sydney where he made his ATP Tour debut in January 2017 at the Sydney International.

== Career ==
=== 2011–16: Professional career beginnings ===
O'Connell played his first ITF Men's Circuit match in October 2011, where he defeated Robert Howe in the Australia F8 before being defeated in the second round. O'Connell ended 2011 with a ranking of 1745. In 2012, O'Connell lost in the first round of qualifying for the Caloundra Challenger while attending the Australian Institute of Sport on a tennis scholarship. He played two more ITF tournaments in Asia before having an 22-month hiatus from professional tennis.

In 2014, O'Connell was given a wild card into the qualifying rounds of the 2014 McDonald's Burnie International, where he qualified and made the quarter-final. He then played a series of ITF tournaments across Australia before travelling to Europe. In June 2014, he played in and won his first ITF Men's Circuit final in Bol, Croatia. He returned to Australia and played in the Latrobe City Traralgon ATP Challenger. He ended 2014 with a ranking of 487. In 2015, O'Connell played sporadically on the ITF and Challenger circuits across Australia and Asia, without a title. His best result was a quarter-final result at Gimcheon Challenger. Also in 2015, O'Connell worked in his hometown of Sydney, Australia to save money. He ended 2015 the year with a ranking of 567.

In 2016, O'Connell won five ITF Futures titles across Australia and Europe. In December 2016, O'Connell said; "I decided this year just to play a lot of matches. I think I've played over 80 matches this year and I've predominantly been in Europe – I was there for about seven months just playing week-in and week-out on the clay so I've got a lot match fitness and experience." Massively improving his ranking in 2016, O'Connell finished the year ranked 237.

=== 2017–18: ATP debut, injuries, rankings drop ===
In January 2017, O'Connell made his ATP World Tour debut after qualifying for the Sydney International in his hometown. He was defeated in the first round by Portugal's Gastão Elias. O'Connell then received a wildcard for the 2017 Australian Open where he lost his first round match in straight sets to (then) world number 15 Grigor Dimitrov in his Grand Slam debut. O'Connell then competed in the Burnie and Launceston challengers, before competing on the ATP Challenger Tour across Asia, Europe and North America with limited success. In October, O'Connell qualified for and reached the semi-final of the Fairfield Challenger. O'Connell finished 2017 with a singles ranking of 393.

The 2018 season was interrupted by a knee injury for O'Connell where he was only able to play 24 matches across the Futures, Challenger and ATP World Tours finishing the year with a singles ranking of 1185.

=== 2019: Injury return, Challenger title ===
O'Connell began the year receiving wildcards into qualifying for both the 2019 Brisbane International and 2019 Sydney International, losing to Cristian Garín and Guido Andreozzi respectively.

After the restructuring of the ITF/ATP points system and the launch of the ITF World Tour, O'Connell returned to the Futures circuit to start his 2019 season. Playing on clay, he made consecutive finals in Mornington before travelling to Europe to play in tournaments in Turkey and Bosnia and Herzegovina, winning titles in Antalya and Doboj while improving his ATP singles ranking to No. 559 and his ITF World Tour singles ranking to No. 52 by mid-May. "I had a fair bit of time off, so after coming back it takes longer to get into the swing of things," O'Connell, said. "I finally feel like I'm starting to find a bit of form and get more comfortable on the court."

Reaching an ITF World Tour singles ranking of No. 5 and leading the Tour in Finals made with 10, O'Connell returned to the ATP Challenger Tour in July recording wins in San Benedetto, Sopot and Tampere, most notably defeating former world number 5 Tommy Robredo in straight sets in their second round clash at the 2019 BNP Paribas Sopot Open. Adjusting back to the Challenger Tour quickly, O'Connell made a breakthrough at the 2019 Internazionali di Tennis del Friuli Venezia Giulia in Cordenons, Italy, claiming his first Challenger Tour title with a straight sets victory over German Jeremy Jahn in the final. With his maiden title, O'Connell's ATP Tour ranking improved from 313 to 220 in men's singles. In September, O'Connell reached the final of Sibiu Challenger, which saw his ranking inside the top 200 for the first time.

In October, O'Connell defeated American Steve Johnson in straight sets to claim his second Challenger title of the year to at the 2019 Fairfield Challenger in Fairfield, California. Speaking of O'Connell's performance, four time ATP champion and former world No. 21 Johnson said: "I thought he played some of the best tennis of his life. Too good. And when that happens, you say ‘too good’ and move on." O'Connell then followed his title with a series of strong results on the Challenger Tour, making semi-finals in Las Vegas and Houston & a final in Knoxville where he was defeated by Michael Mmoh in straight sets.

He finished 2019 with a singles ranking of No. 119, a career-high.

=== 2020: First Grand Slam match win ===
In January, O'Connell reached the quarterfinals of the 2020 Bendigo Challenger. O'Connell was awarded a wildcard into the 2020 Australian Open, where he lost in four sets to 17th seed Andrey Rublev. In February, O'Connell reached the semifinals of the 2020 Challenger Banque Nationale de Drummondville, before the COVID-19 shutdown.

Upon recommencement, O'Connell won his first Grand Slam match, defeating Laslo Djere at the 2020 US Open. O'Connell finished 2020 with a singles ranking of No. 120.

=== 2021: First ATP quarterfinal, Masters debut ===
O'Connell commenced 2021 at the 2021 Great Ocean Road Open, where he reached the second round.

The following week having been awarded a third wildcard at the Australian Open, O'Connell achieved an upset first round victory against Jan-Lennard Struff before falling to Moldovan Radu Albot in the second round.

He made his Masters debut at the 2021 Miami Open with a direct entry into the main draw.

In his first participation in his career in the main draw at the French Open as a wildcard, O'Connell lost in the first round to Tommy Paul in a tight five sets match. In June, he also qualified for the first time in his career for the Wimbledon main draw, where he lost in the first round to No. 13 seed Gaël Monfils.

In July, O'Connell qualified for and won his fourth and fifth career ATP main draw matches at the Atlanta Open. In Atlanta, O'Connell reached his first ATP quarterfinal and registered his first win over a top 30 player, defeating Jannik Sinner in the second round. He would end up losing to John Isner in the quarterfinals. Following the US Open, O'Connell reached the final of the Saint-Tropez Challenger. O'Connell finished 2021 with a singles ranking of No. 175.

=== 2022: Australian Open 3rd round, top 100 ===
O'Connell was awarded a fourth wildcard into the 2022 Australian Open. He defeated Hugo Gaston in the first round. He reached the third round of a Grand Slam for the first time in his career defeating thirteenth seed and world No. 13 Diego Schwartzman in straight sets. He would lose to American Maxime Cressy in the third round. As a result, he returned to the top 150 at world No. 147 on 31 January 2022. O'Connell qualified for Dubai, where he lost to Andy Murray in the first round, despite winning the first set.

O'Connell won his 12th challenger title in Split, after Zsombor Piros retired in the final trailing 0–2 in the second set after O'Connell won the first. He also upset Albert Ramos Viñolas after qualifying for Geneva before losing to 4th seed Reilly Opelka in the second round. He received a second consecutive wildcard for the 2022 French Open in May. He made his top 100 debut on 18 July 2022 following the 2022 Wimbledon Championships where he did not participate.

He reached his first ATP semifinal at the 2022 San Diego Open defeating compatriot Jason Kubler by retirement, eight seed J. J. Wolf and second seed Jenson Brooksby.

O'Connell finished 2022 with an ATP singles ranking of No. 79.

=== 2023: Major third round and ATP semifinal ===
O'Connell started his 2023 season in Adelaide. At the first tournament, he lost in the first round to Miomir Kecmanović. At the second tournament, he fell in the final round of qualifying to compatriot John Millman. However, due to the withdrawal of Sebastian Korda, he earned a spot as a lucky loser into the main draw. He was defeated in the first round by eighth seed Tommy Paul. At the Australian Open, he lost in the first round to American Jenson Brooksby in four sets. In February, O'Connell played at the 2023 Bahrain Ministry of Interior Challenger. Seeded third, he lost in the second round to Jan-Lennard Struff.

In April, in Munich, Bavaria he reached his second ATP semifinal defeating third seed and world No. 16 Alexander Zverev en route, his first top-20 win of the season.

In July, at the 2023 Wimbledon Championships he reached the third round of Grand Slam for a second time but lost to Christopher Eubanks. Following reaching the second round at the US Open and winning his fifth Challenger title, the Road to Rolex Shanghai Masters, he reached the top 55 at world No. 53 in the rankings on 11 September 2023.

=== 2024: US Open third round ===
In January, at the Australian Open he defeated Cristian Garin in five sets.

In March, at the 2024 BNP Paribas Open he reached the second round defeating Jack Draper. At the 2024 Miami Open he reached the fourth round of a Masters for the first time in his career, having never been past the second round at this level, defeating qualifier Vít Kopřiva, 21st seed Francis Tiafoe and wildcard Martin Damm Jr.. He lost to eventual champion Jannik Sinner.

At the 2024 US Open, he reached his third Grand Slam third round with wins over 26th seed Nicolas Jarry and Mattia Bellucci.

== Personal life ==
O'Connell told in interviews his tennis idol is former French Open champion Gastón Gaudio. His father, Ian, is Irish.

== Performance timelines ==
Key
W	F	SF	QF	#R	RR	Q#	P#	DNQ	A	Z#	PO	G	S	B	NMS	NTI	P	NH

(W) winner; (F) finalist; (SF) semifinalist; (QF) quarterfinalist; (#R) rounds 4, 3, 2, 1; (RR) round-robin stage; (Q#) qualification round; (P#) preliminary round; (DNQ) did not qualify; (A) absent; (Z#) Davis/Fed Cup Zonal Group (with number indication) or (PO) play-off; (G) gold, (S) silver or (B) bronze Olympic/Paralympic medal; (NMS) not a Masters tournament; (NTI) not a Tier I tournament; (P) postponed; (NH) not held; (SR) strike rate (events won / competed); (W–L) win–loss record.
To avoid confusion and double counting, these charts are updated at the conclusion of a tournament or when the player's participation has ended.

=== Singles ===
Current through to 2026 Wimbledon Championships.

Tournament	2017	2018	2019	2020	2021	2022	2023	2024	2025	2026	SR	W–L	Win %
Grand Slam tournaments
Australian Open	1R	A	A	1R	2R	3R	1R	2R	1R	1R	0 / 8	4–8	33%
French Open	A	A	A	Q1	1R	1R	1R	A	1R	Q1	0 / 4	0–4	0%
Wimbledon	A	A	A	NH	1R	A	3R	1R	1R	Q3	0 / 4	2–4	33%
US Open	A	A	A	2R	Q2	1R	2R	3R	1R		0 / 5	4–5	44%
Win–loss	0–1	0–0	0–0	1–2	1–3	2–3	3–4	3–3	0–4	0–1	0 / 21	10–21	32%
ATP 1000 tournaments
Indian Wells Open	A	A	A	NH	A	Q2	Q1	2R	2R	1R	0 / 2	2–2	50%
Miami Open	A	A	A	NH	1R	A	1R	4R	1R	1R	0 / 5	3–5	38%
Monte-Carlo Masters	A	A	A	NH	A	A	A	1R	A	A	0 / 1	0–1	0%
Madrid Open	A	A	A	NH	A	A	2R	1R	2R	Q1	0 / 3	2–3	40%
Italian Open	A	A	A	A	A	A	1R	1R	1R	Q1	0 / 3	0–3	0%
Canadian Open	A	A	A	NH	A	A	Q2	Q2	3R	1R	0 / 2	2–1	67%
Cincinnati Open	A	A	A	A	A	Q1	Q1	A	A	4R	0 / 1	2–1	67%
Shanghai Masters	A	A	A	NH			1R	1R	2R		0 / 3	1–3	25%
Paris Masters	A	A	A	A	A	A	Q2	1R	A		0 / 1	0–1	0%
Win–loss	0–0	0–0	0–0	0–0	0–1	0–0	1–4	4–7	5–5	2–4	0 / 22	12–21	36%
Career Statistics
Overall win–loss	0–2	0–0	0–0	1–2	4–9	6–12	19–23	17–22	7–14	4–8	Career Total: 64–98		
Win %	0%	–	–	33%	31%	33%	45%	44%	33%	33%	Career Total: 40%		
Year-end ranking	393	–	119	120	175	79	68	64	115		Career High: 53		

=== Doubles ===
Tournament	2020	2021	2022	2023	2024	2025	SR	W–L	Win %
Grand Slam tournaments
Australian Open	1R	A	3R	A	1R	1R	0 / 4	2–4	33%
French Open	A	A	A	A	A	A	0 / 0	0–0	–
Wimbledon	NH	A	A	1R	A	A	0 / 1	0–1	0%
US Open	A	A	A	1R	A		0 / 1	0–1	0%
Win–loss	0–1	0–0	2–1	0–2	0–1	0–1	0 / 6	2–6	25%
Year-end ranking	699	1170	563T	883	1262				

== ATP Challenger and ITF Tour finals ==
=== Singles: 28 (16–12) ===
Legend ATP Challenger (7–4) ITF Futures/WTT (9–8)	Finals by surface Hard (7–4) Clay (8–8) Grass (1–0)

Result	W–L	Date	Tournament	Tier	Surface	Opponent	Score
Win	1–0	Aug 2019	Cordenons International, Italy	Challenger	Clay	(Germany) Jeremy Jahn	7–5, 6–2
Loss	1–1	Sep 2019	Sibiu Open, Romania	Challenger	Clay	(Serbia) Danilo Petrović	4–6, 2–6
Win	2–1	Oct 2019	Fairfield Challenger, US	Challenger	Hard	(United States) Steve Johnson	6–4, 6–4
Loss	2–2	Nov 2019	Knoxville Challenger, US	Challenger	Hard (i)	(United States) Michael Mmoh	4–6, 4–6
Loss	2–3	Aug 2021	Saint-Tropez Open, France	Challenger	Hard	(France) Benjamin Bonzi	7–6^{(12–10)}, 1–6, 0–0 ret.
Win	3–3	Apr 2022	Split Open, Croatia	Challenger	Clay	(Hungary) Zsombor Piros	6–3, 2-0 ret.
Loss	3–4	Jul 2022	Porto Challenger, Portugal	Challenger	Hard	(Turkey) Altuğ Çelikbilek	6–7^{(5–7)}, 1–3 ret.
Win	4–4	Oct 2022	Keio Challenger, Japan	Challenger	Hard	(Japan) Yosuke Watanuki	6–1, 6–7^{(5–7)}, 6–3
Win	5–4	Sep 2023	Shanghai Challenger, China	Challenger	Hard	(Japan) Yosuke Watanuki	6–3, 7–5
Win	6–4	Sep 2024	Guangzhou International, China	Challenger	Hard	(Japan) Sho Shimabukuro	1–6, 7–5, 7–6^{(7–5)}
Win	7–4	Jun 2026	Nottingham Open, UK	Challenger	Grass	(Finland) Otto Virtanen	7–6^{(7–3)}, 7–6^{(8–6)}
Win	1–0	Jun 2014	F12 Bol, Croatia	Futures	Clay	(Argentina) Gastón-Arturo Grimilizzi	7–6 ^{(7–4)}, 3–6, 7–6 ^{(7–1)}
Win	2–0	Feb 2016	F1 Port Pirie, Australia	Futures	Hard	(Australia) Blake Mott	7–6 ^{(8–6)}, 3–6, 6–2
Loss	2–1	Mar 2016	F4 Mornington, Australia	Futures	Hard	(Australia) Andrew Whittington	5–7, 3–6
Win	3–1	Jul 2016	F1 Belgrade, Serbia	Futures	Clay	(Bosnia and Herzegovina) Nerman Fatić	6–4, 6–1
Win	4–1	Aug 2016	F4 Novi Sad, Serbia	Futures	Clay	(Italy) Stefano Travaglia	7–6 ^{(8–6)}, 6–4
Win	5–1	Oct 2016	F8 Cairns, Australia	Futures	Hard	(Australia) Blake Mott	0–6, 6–2, 6–4
Win	6–1	Nov 2016	F10 Blacktown, Australia	Futures	Hard	(Australia) Max Purcell	6–2, 6–2
Loss	6–2	Mar 2019	M15 Mornington, Australia	WTT	Clay	(Australia) Harry Bourchier	4–6, 4–6
Loss	6–3	Mar 2019	M15 Mornington, Australia	WTT	Clay	(Australia) Harry Bourchier	4–6, 6–4, 3–6
Loss	6–4	Apr 2019	M15 Antalya, Turkey	WTT	Clay	(Russia) Ronald Slobodchikov	6–7 ^{(5–7)}, 6–3, 1–6
Loss	6–5	Apr 2019	M15 Antalya, Turkey	WTT	Clay	(Belgium) Christopher Heyman	6–4, 3–6, 6–7 ^{(0–7)}
Win	7–5	Apr 2019	M15 Antalya, Turkey	WTT	Clay	(Czech Republic) Jonáš Forejtek	2–6, 6–4, 6–1
Win	8–5	May 2019	M25 Doboj, Bosnia and Herzegovina	WTT	Clay	(Netherlands) Botic van de Zandschulp	6–4, 7–6 ^{(7–1)}
Loss	8–6	May 2019	M15 Brčko, Bosnia and Herzegovina	WTT	Clay	(Argentina) Juan Pablo Ficovich	4–6, 4–6
Loss	8–7	Jun 2019	M25 Kiseljak, Bosnia and Herzegovina	WTT	Clay	(Argentina) Francisco Cerúndolo	6–3, 4–6, 4–6
Win	9–7	Jun 2019	M15 Balatonalmádi, Hungary	WTT	Clay	(Hungary) Gergely Madarász	6–3, 6–1
Loss	9–8	Jul 2019	M25 Casinalbo, Italy	WTT	Clay	(Sweden) Christian Lindell	6–7^{(5–7)}, 7–5, 3–6

=== Doubles: 1 (title) ===
Legend ITF Futures (1–0)

Result	W–L	Date	Tournament	Category	Surface	Partner	Opponents	Score
Win	1–0	Sep 2014	F17 Bol, Croatia	Futures	Clay	(United Kingdom) Jonny O'Mara	(Slovenia) Blaž Bizjak (Slovakia) Peter Mick	6–2, 6–4
