= Jay Friend =

Japanese tennis player (born 2003)

Jay Dylan Friend
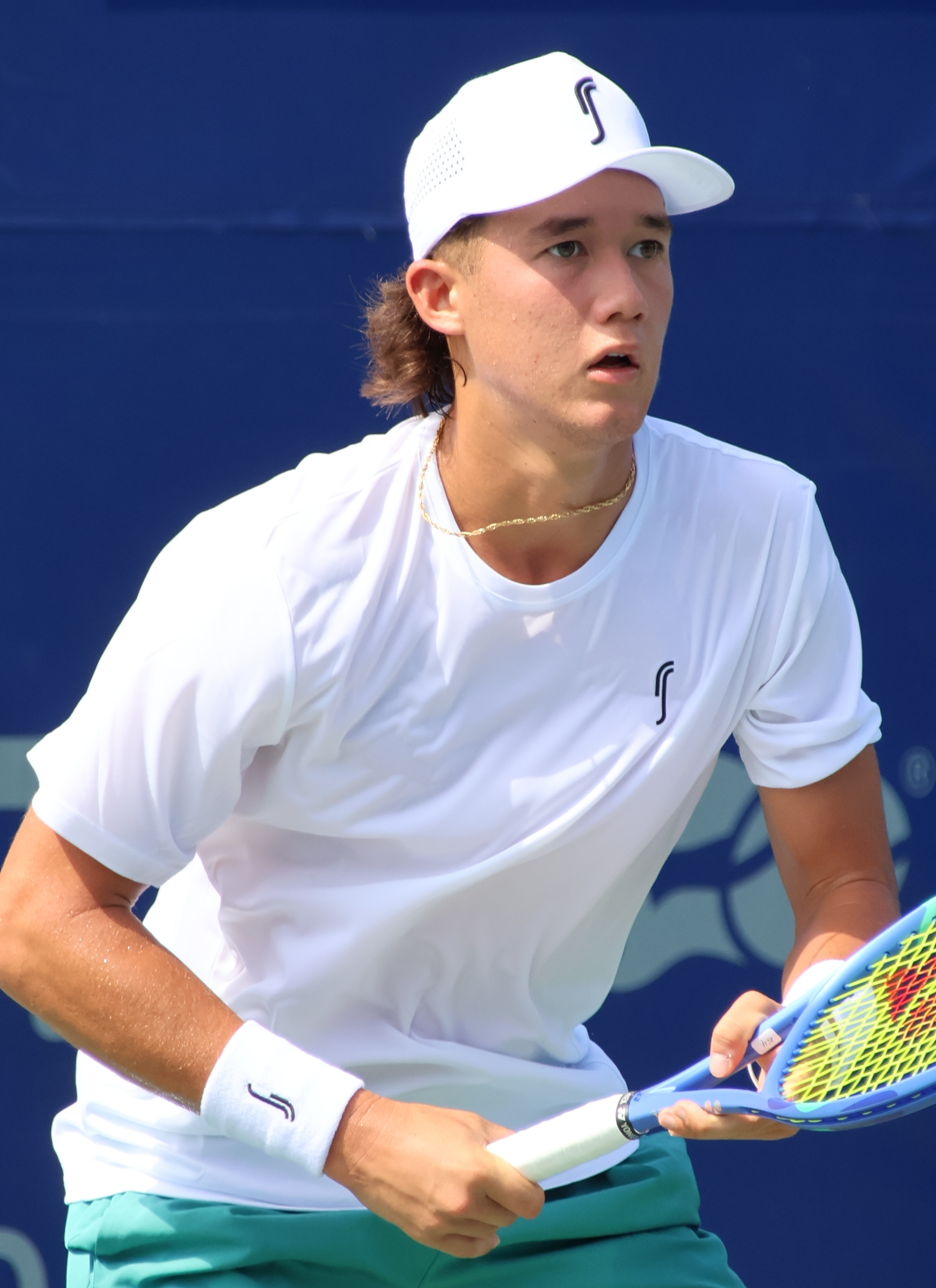
- Friend in 2026
- Full name: Jay Dylan Hara Friend
- Country (sports): Japan
- Born: 22 December 2003 (age 22) Tokyo, Japan
- Height: 1.85 m (6 ft 1 in)
- Plays: Right-handed (two-handed backhand)
- College: Arizona
- Prize money: US $97,286

Singles
- Career record: 0–0 (at ATP Tour level, Grand Slam level, and in Davis Cup)
- Career titles: 1 Challenger
- Highest ranking: No. 250 (16 November 2026)
- Current ranking: No. 250 (16 November 2026)

Doubles
- Career record: 0–0 (at ATP Tour level, Grand Slam level, and in Davis Cup)
- Career titles: 1 ITF
- Highest ranking: No. 342 (16 November 2026)
- Current ranking: No. 342 (16 November 2026)
Medal record
Men's tennis
Representing Japan
Asian Games
| Gold medal – first place | 2026 Aichi–Nagoya | Mixed doubles |
- Last updated on: 16 November 2026.

Jay Dylan Hara Friend (born 22 December 2003) is a Japanese tennis player. Friend has a career-high ATP singles ranking of No. 250 and a career-high ATP doubles ranking of No. 342, both achieved on 16 November 2026.

Friend played college tennis at the University of Arizona.

== Career ==
Friend won his maiden ATP Challenger singles title at the 2025 Fairfield Challenger after qualifying for the main draw.
