= Max Wiskandt =

German tennis player (born 2002)

- Country (sports): Germany
- Born: 1 February 2002 (age 24) Marbella, Spain
- Height: 1.91 m (6 ft 3 in)
- Plays: Right-handed
- Prize money: US $110,515

Singles
- Career record: 0–0 (at ATP Tour level, Grand Slam level, and in Davis Cup)
- Career titles: 1 ITF
- Highest ranking: No. 365 (27 July 2026)
- Current ranking: No. 382 (28 September 2026)

Doubles
- Career record: 0–0 (at ATP Tour level, Grand Slam level, and in Davis Cup)
- Career titles: 1 Challenger, 1 ITF
- Highest ranking: No. 457 (28 September 2026)
- Current ranking: No. 457 (28 September 2026)
- Last updated on: 29 September 2026.

Max Wiskandt (born 1 February 2002) is a Spanish-born German tennis player. Wiskandt has a career high ATP singles ranking of world No. 365 achieved on 27 July 2026 and a career high doubles ranking of No. 457 achieved on 28 September 2026.

Wiskandt has won one ATP Challenger doubles title at the 2025 Fairfield Challenger.

== ATP Challenger Tour finals ==
=== Singles: 1 (1 runner-up) ===
Finals by surface
Hard (0–0)
Clay (0–1)

Result	W–L	Date	Tournament	Surface	Opponent	Score
Loss	0–1	Apr 2025	San Luis Open, Mexico	Clay	(Australia) James Duckworth	1–6, 1–6

=== Doubles: 3 (2 titles, 1 runner-up) ===
Finals by surface
Hard (1–0)
Clay (1–0)

Result	W–L	Date	Tournament	Surface	Partner	Opponents	Score
Win	1–0	Oct 2025	Fairfield Challenger, United States	Hard	(Germany) Mats Rosenkranz	(United States) Spencer Johnson (United States) Wally Thayne	3–6, 7–5, [10–6]
Win	2–0	Apr 2026	Shymkent Challenger, Kazakhstan	Clay	(Germany) Max Hans Rehberg	(United States) Dali Blanch; Svyatoslav Gulin	6–1, 5–7, [10–6]
Loss	2–1	Oct 2026	Internazionali di Sicilia, Italy	Clay	(Czech Republic) Jonáš Forejtek	(Ukraine) Oleksandr Ovcharenko (Germany) Kai Wehnelt	5–7, 2–6

== ITF World Tennis Tour finals ==
=== Singles: 7 (4 titles, 3 runner-ups) ===
Result	W–L	Date	Tournament	Surface	Opponent	Score
Loss	0–1	Nov 2023	M15 Monastir, Tunisia	Hard	Egor Agafonov	4–6, 6–4, 6–7^{(7–9)}
Loss	0–2	May 2024	M15 Monastir, Tunisia	Hard	(United Kingdom) Stuart Parker	5–7, 2–6
Win	1–2	May 2024	M15 Monastir, Tunisia	Hard	(Ukraine) Vladyslav Orlov	6–0, 3–0 ret.
Win	2–2	May 2026	M15 Kuršumlijska Banja, Serbia	Clay	(Germany) Christian Djonov	6–3, 6–0
Win	3–2	Jun 2026	M25 Marburg, Germany	Clay	(Czech Republic) Daniel Siniakov	6–1, 6–4
Win	4–2	Jul 2026	M25 Kassel, Germany	Clay	(Czech Republic) Matthew William Donald	7–5, 6–3
Loss	4–3	Jul 2026	M25 Kramsach, Austria	Clay	(Ukraine) Vladyslav Orlov	7–5, 3–6, 2–6

=== Doubles: 5 (1 title, 4 runner-ups) ===
Result	W–L	Date	Tournament	Surface	Partner	Opponents	Score
Loss	0–1	Sep 2023	M15 Monastir, Tunisia	Hard	(Australia) Thomas Braithwaite	(United States) Keshav Chopra (United States) Andres Martin	1–6, 4–6
Loss	0–2	Oct 2023	M15 Monastir, Tunisia	Hard	(Australia) Thomas Braithwaite	Aleksandr Lobanov; Alexey Nesterov	walkover
Loss	0–3	Oct 2023	M15 Monastir, Tunisia	Hard	(Poland) Olaf Pieczkowski	(Algeria) Samir Hamza Reguig (France) Cyril Vandermeersch	4–6, 6–3, [8–10]
Loss	0–4	Jan 2024	M15 Monastir, Tunisia	Hard	(Germany) Liam Gavrielides	(Netherlands) Michiel de Krom (Netherlands) Ryan Nijboer	5–7, 4–6
Win	1–4	May 2024	M15 Monastir, Tunisia	Hard	(Germany) Niklas Schell	(United Kingdom) James Davis (United Kingdom) Matthew Summers	7–6^{(7–4)}, 6–2
