= Axel Geller =

Argentine tennis player

- Country (sports): Argentina
- Born: 1 April 1999 (age 27) Buenos Aires, Argentina
- Height: 1.93 m (6 ft 4 in)
- Retired: 2022
- Plays: Right-handed
- Prize money: US $21,675

Singles
- Career record: 0–0 (at ATP Tour level, Grand Slam level, and in Davis Cup)
- Career titles: 0
- Highest ranking: No. 539 (5 August 2019)

Doubles
- Career record: 0–0 (at ATP Tour level, Grand Slam level, and in Davis Cup)
- Career titles: 0
- Highest ranking: No. 622 (17 February 2020)

Axel Geller (born 1 April 1999) is an Argentine former tennis player. He was ranked as high as No. 539 in singles, which he achieved in August 2019, by the Association of Tennis Professionals (ATP), and had claimed six singles and doubles titles on the ITF Men's Tour between 2018 and 2019.

In 2017, he became the No. 1-ranked junior after winning the doubles title at Wimbledon and placing runner-up in both singles finals at Wimbledon and the US Open. Geller later attended Stanford University, where he played for the men's tennis team. Following his graduation from Stanford in 2022, he announced his retirement from tennis in order to pursue a career in finance.

== ITF Tour finals ==
=== Singles: 3 (3 titles) ===
| Legend ITF Futures/WTT (3–0) | Finals by surface Hard (3–0) Clay (–) |

| Result | W–L | Date | Tournament | Tier | Surface | Opponent | Score |
|---|---|---|---|---|---|---|---|
| Win | 1–0 | Aug 2018 | US F22, Edwardsville | Futures | Hard | (United States) Sebastian Korda | 6–2, 4–6, 7–6^{(7–0)} |
| Win | 2–0 | Jun 2019 | M15 Cancún, Mexico | WTT | Hard | (United States) Nick Chappell | 6–3, 7–6^{(7–4)} |
| Win | 3–0 | Sep 2019 | M15 Champaign, US | WTT | Hard | (Australia) Adam Walton | 6–3, 4–6, 6–3 |

=== Doubles: 3 (3 titles) ===
| Legend ITF WTT (3–0) | Finals by surface Hard (3–0) Clay (–) |

| Result | W–L | Date | Tournament | Tier | Surface | Partner | Opponents | Score |
|---|---|---|---|---|---|---|---|---|
| Win | 1–0 | Jun 2019 | M15 Cancún, Mexico | WTT | Hard | (Colombia) Nicolás Mejía | (Antigua and Barbuda) Jody Maginley (The Bahamas) Justin Roberts | 6–7^{(5–7)}, 6–1, [10–6] |
| Win | 2–0 | Jul 2019 | M25 Champaign, US | WTT | Hard | (Bolivia) Juan Carlos Aguilar | (Venezuela) Ricardo Rodríguez (United States) Keenan Mayo | 6–4, 6–3 |
| Win | 3–0 | Jul 2019 | M25 Dallas, US | WTT | Hard | (Bolivia) Juan Carlos Aguilar | (Argentina) Alan Kohen (Argentina) Santiago Rodríguez Taverna | 6–1, 6–3 |

== Junior Grand Slam finals ==
=== Singles: 2 (2 runner-ups) ===
| Result | Year | Tournament | Surface | Opponent | Score |
|---|---|---|---|---|---|
| Loss | 2017 | Wimbledon | Grass | (Spain) Alejandro Davidovich Fokina | 6–7^{(2–7)}, 3–6 |
| Loss | 2017 | US Open | Hard | (China) Wu Yibing | 4–6, 4–6 |

=== Doubles: 1 (title) ===
| Result | Year | Tournament | Surface | Partner | Opponents | Score |
|---|---|---|---|---|---|---|
| Win | 2017 | Wimbledon | Grass | (Chinese Taipei) Hsu Yu-hsiou | (Austria) Jurij Rodionov (Czech Republic) Michael Vrbenský | 6–4, 6–4 |

Awards and achievements
| Preceded by (Serbia) Miomir Kecmanović | ITF Junior World Champion; 2017 | Succeeded by (Chinese Taipei) Tseng Chun-hsin |
