= Zachary Svajda =

American tennis player (born 2002)

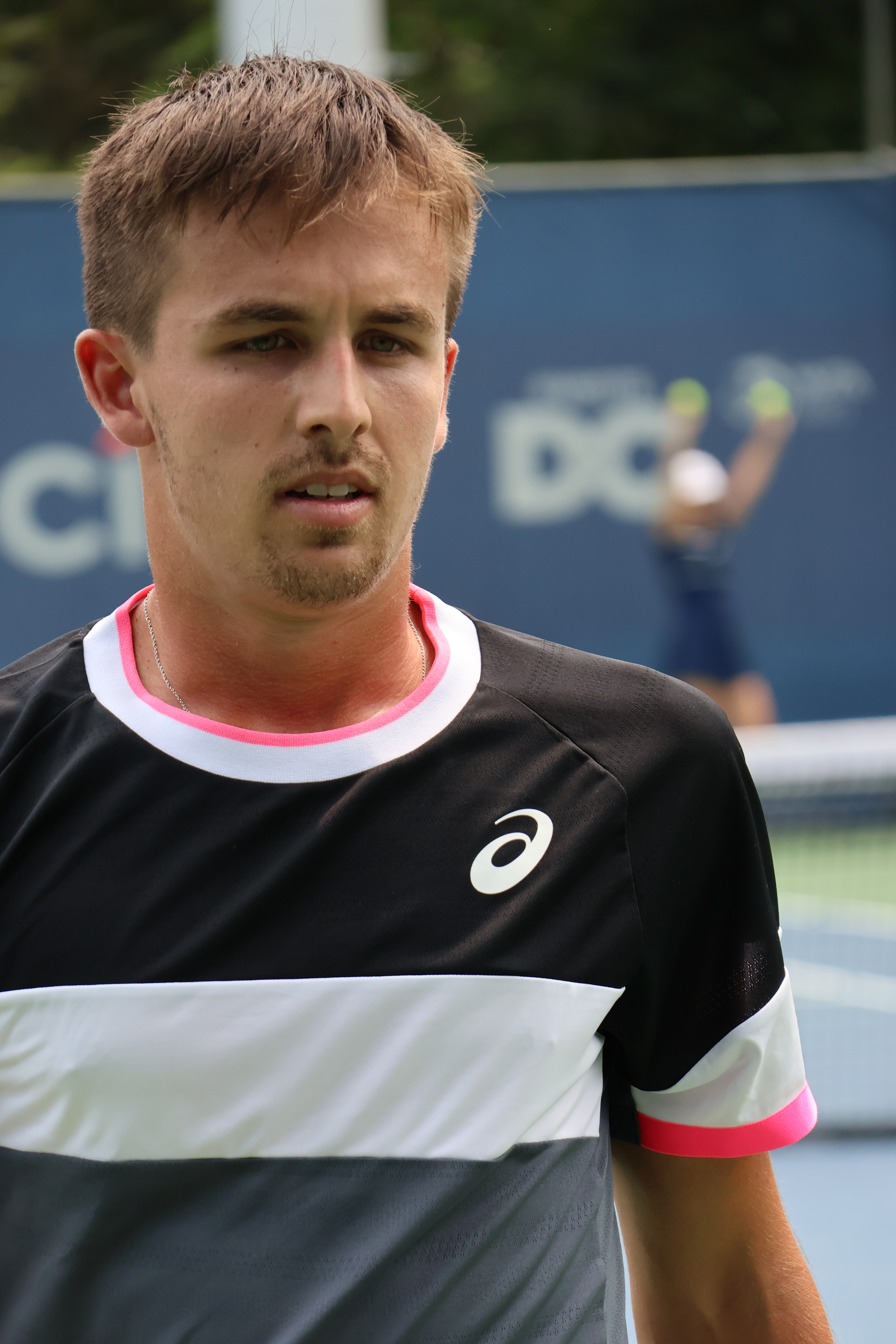
- Svajda at the 2023 Washington Open
- Country (sports): United States
- Residence: San Diego, California, US
- Born: November 29, 2002 (age 23) La Jolla, California, US
- Height: 5 ft 9 in (1.75 m)
- Turned pro: 2019
- Plays: Right-handed (two-handed backhand)
- Coach: David Nainkin, Rhyne Williams, Raymond Sarmiento
- Prize money: US $2,242,367

Singles
- Career record: 17–32 (Note: In ATP Tour and Grand Slam main draw matches, Summer Olympics, Davis Cup, United Cup, Laver Cup)
- Career titles: 0
- Highest ranking: No. 62 (June 8, 2026)
- Current ranking: No. 78 (November 9, 2026)

Grand Slam singles results
- Australian Open: 1R (2026)
- French Open: 4R (2026)
- Wimbledon: 3R (2026)
- US Open: 2R (2021, 2025, 2026)

Doubles
- Career record: 0–2
- Career titles: 0
- Highest ranking: No. 664 (August 8, 2022)
- Current ranking: No. 1,343 (August 31, 2026)
- Last updated on: August 31, 2026.

Zachary Svajda (/ˈsvaɪ.də/ SVY-duh; born November 29, 2002) is an American professional tennis player. He has a career-high ATP singles ranking of world No. 62 achieved on June 8, 2026 and a doubles ranking of No. 664 reached on August 8, 2022.

== Early life and background ==
A native of San Diego, California, Svajda took up tennis at the age of 2, initially coached by Matt Hanlin. He is of Czech descent. He has a younger brother Trevor who is also a tennis player, and studied at Southern Methodist University.

== Career ==
=== 2018: Pro beginnings ===
Svajda earned his first ATP World Tour ranking point at the age of 15, defeating top-seeded João Lucas Reis da Silva 6–3, 6–4 at the 2018 Claremont Club Pro USTA Tennis Classic as a local main-draw wildcard.

=== 2019-20: ATP and Grand Slam debut ===
On August 11, 2019, Svajda defeated Govind Nanda 6–7^{(3–7)}, 7–5, 6–3, 6–1 to win the USTA Boys 18s National Championship. This victory earned the 16-year-old a wildcard into the main draw of the 2019 US Open, making him the youngest player to play in the men's US Open since Donald Young in 2005. He lost in the first round to Paolo Lorenzi in five sets.

=== 2021: First Major win at the US Open ===
After defeating Ben Shelton 6–1, 6–4, 6–1 to defend his Boys 18s National Championship title, Svajda was given a wildcard into the US Open, losing in the second round to Jannik Sinner.

=== 2022: First Challenger title ===
Svajda won his first title at the 2022 Tiburon Challenger defeating compatriot Ben Shelton.

=== 2023: Three Challenger titles, ATP 500 win, top 150 ===
Svajda recorded his first ATP win outside a Major and first at an ATP 500 tournament at the 2023 Citi Open in Washington over Max Purcell. In August, Svajda entered the main draw of the US Open as a qualifier. He won the 2023 Cary Challenger II. Two weeks later, he won the 2023 Tiburon Challenger.

=== 2024-25: US Open wildcard & Challenger 125 title ===
In August 2024, Svajda received a wildcard for the main draw of the 2024 US Open.

In July 2025, Svajda won his first Challenger 125 title at the 2025 Hall of Fame Open.

=== 2026: Australian Open, French Open, & Wimbledon debuts, top 100 ===
Svajda began 2026 by making his Australian Open main draw debut as a qualifier and winning his seventh Challenger trophy at the 2026 San Diego Open. At the 2026 Delray Beach Open, he reached the round of 16 and then made his debut in the top 100 in the ATP singles rankings on 23 February 2026.

At the 2026 French Open, Svajda reached the fourth round on his debut including wins over Alexei Popyrin and Adam Walton. He upset 25th seed Francisco Cerúndolo in five sets, to reach a Grand Slam fourth round for the first time in his career.

Svadja was one of 15 Americans to reach the third round of Wimbledon where he won matches against Pablo Llamas Ruiz and Kamil Majchrzak in his Wimbledon main draw debut before eventually falling to 5th seed Alex de Minaur in four sets.

== Performance timeline ==
Key
| W | F | SF | QF | #R | RR | Q# | DNQ | A | NH |

(W) winner; (F) finalist; (SF) semifinalist; (QF) quarterfinalist; (#R) rounds 4, 3, 2, 1; (RR) round-robin stage; (Q#) qualification round; (DNQ) did not qualify; (A) absent; (NH) not held; (SR) strike rate (events won / competed); (W–L) win–loss record.
To avoid confusion and double counting, these charts are updated at the conclusion of a tournament or when the player's participation has ended.

=== Singles ===
| Tournament | 2019 | 2020 | 2021 | 2022 | 2023 | 2024 | 2025 | 2026 | W–L | SR | Win % |
|---|---|---|---|---|---|---|---|---|---|---|---|
Grand Slam tournaments
| Australian Open | A | A | A | A | A | Q2 | Q2 | 1R | 0 / 1 | 0–1 | 0% |
| French Open | A | A | A | A | Q1 | Q2 | Q2 | 4R | 0 / 1 | 3–1 | 75% |
| Wimbledon | A | NH | A | A | Q2 | Q2 | Q2 | 3R | 0 / 1 | 2–1 | 67% |
| US Open | 1R | A | 2R | Q2 | 1R | 1R | 2R | 2R | 0 / 6 | 3–6 | 33% |
| Win–loss | 0–1 | 0–0 | 1–1 | 0–0 | 0–1 | 0–1 | 1–1 | 6–4 | 0 / 9 | 8–9 | 47% |
ATP Masters 1000
| Indian Wells Masters | A | NH | 1R | A | Q2 | Q2 | Q1 | 2R | 0 / 2 | 1–2 | 33% |
| Miami Open | A | NH | A | A | A | Q1 | A | 1R | 0 / 1 | 0–1 | 0% |
| Monte Carlo Masters | A | NH | A | A | A | A | A | A | 0 / 0 | 0–0 | – |
| Madrid Open | A | NH | A | A | A | Q1 | A | Q1 | 0 / 0 | 0–0 | – |
| Italian Open | A | A | A | A | A | A | A | 2R | 0 / 1 | 1–1 | 50% |
| Canadian Open | A | NH | A | A | A | A | A | 2R | 0 / 1 | 1–1 | 50% |
| Cincinnati Masters | A | A | A | A | A | Q2 | Q1 | 1R | 0 / 1 | 0–1 | 0% |
| Shanghai Masters | A | NH | | | A | 2R | A | 2R | 0 / 2 | 2–2 | 50% |
| Paris Masters | A | A | A | A | A | A | A | Q1 | 0 / 0 | 0–0 | – |
| Win–loss | 0–0 | 0–0 | 0–1 | 0–0 | 0–0 | 1–1 | 0–0 | 4–6 | 0 / 8 | 5–8 | 38% |

== ATP Challenger and ITF Tour finals ==
=== Singles: 11 (10 titles, 1 runner-up) ===
| Legend ATP Challenger Tour (7–1) ITF WTT (3–0) | Finals by surface Hard (9–1) Clay (–) Grass (1–0) |

| Result | W–L | Date | Tournament | Tier | Surface | Opponent | Score |
|---|---|---|---|---|---|---|---|
| Win | 1–0 | Oct 2022 | Tiburon Challenger, US | Challenger | Hard | (United States) Ben Shelton | 2–6, 6–2, 6–4 |
| Win | 2–0 | Sep 2023 | Cary Challenger, US | Challenger | Hard | (Australia) Rinky Hijikata | 7–6^{(7–3)}, 4–6, 6–1 |
| Win | 3–0 | Oct 2023 | Tiburon Challenger, US (2) | Challenger | Hard | (Australia) Adam Walton | 6–2, 6–2 |
| Win | 4–0 | Oct 2023 | Fairfield Challenger, US | Challenger | Hard | (United States) Nishesh Basavareddy | 6–4, 6–1 |
| Loss | 4–1 | Jan 2024 | Southern California Open, US | Challenger | Hard | (Jamaica) Blaise Bicknell | 3–6, 2–6 |
| Win | 5–1 | Jul 2025 | Hall of Fame Open, US | Challenger | Grass | (France) Adrian Mannarino | 7–5, 6–3 |
| Win | 6–1 | Jul 2025 | Lexington Open, US | Challenger | Hard | (Australia) Bernard Tomic | 2–6, 6–3, 6–2 |
| Win | 7–1 | Jan 2026 | San Diego Open, US | Challenger | Hard | (United States) Sebastian Korda | 6–4, 7–6^{(7–5)} |

| Result | W–L | Date | Tournament | Tier | Surface | Opponent | Score |
|---|---|---|---|---|---|---|---|
| Win | 1–0 | Mar 2021 | M25 Austin, US | WTT | Hard | (United States) Eduardo Nava | 6–4, 4–6, 6–4 |
| Win | 2–0 | Jun 2022 | M15 Los Angeles, US | WTT | Hard | (United States) Brandon Holt | 7–5, 6–4 |
| Win | 3–0 | Jul 2022 | M15 Fountain Valley, US | WTT | Hard | (United States) Sekou Bangoura | 6–3, 6–1 |
