= Fairfield Challenger =

- 2025 Fairfield Challenger

ATP Challenger Tour
- Event name: Solano Challenger
- Location: Fairfield, California, United States
- Venue: Solano Community College
- Category: ATP Challenger Tour
- Surface: Hard
- Draw: 32S/32Q/16D
- Prize money: $60,000 (2025), $100,000
- Website: website

The Solano Challenger (previously Fairfield Pro Tennis Championship, Northbay Healthcare Men's Pro Championship) is a professional tennis tournament played on hardcourts. It is currently part of the ATP Challenger Tour. It is held annually in Fairfield, California, a suburb of San Francisco, since 2015.

== Past finals ==
=== Singles ===
Year	Champion	Runner-up	Score
2025	(Japan) Jay Dylan Friend	(Australia) Edward Winter	6–7^{(3–7)}, 6–3, 6–2
2024	(United States) Learner Tien	(Australia) Bernard Tomic	6–0, 6–1
2023	(United States) Zachary Svajda	(United States) Nishesh Basavareddy	6–4, 6–1
2022	(United States) Michael Mmoh	(Canada) Gabriel Diallo	6–3, 6–2
2020–2021	Not held		
2019	(Australia) Christopher O'Connell	(United States) Steve Johnson	6–4, 6–4
2018	(United States) Bjorn Fratangelo	(Australia) Alex Bolt	6–4, 6–3
2017	(United States) Mackenzie McDonald	(United States) Bradley Klahn	6–4, 6–2
2016	(Colombia) Santiago Giraldo	(France) Quentin Halys	4–6, 6–4, 6–2
2015	(United States) Taylor Fritz	(Germany) Dustin Brown	6–3, 6–4

=== Doubles ===
Year	Champions	Runners-up	Score
2025	(Germany) Mats Rosenkranz (Germany) Max Wiskandt	(United States) Spencer Johnson (United States) Wally Thayne	3–6, 7–5, [10–6]
2024	(United States) Ryan Seggerman (United States) Patrik Trhac	(Romania) Gabi Adrian Boitan (United States) Bruno Kuzuhara	6–2, 3–6, [10–5]
2023	(United States) Evan King (United States) Reese Stalder	(United States) Vasil Kirkov (United States) Denis Kudla	7–5, 6–3
2022	(United Kingdom) Julian Cash (United Kingdom) Henry Patten	(India) Anirudh Chandrasekar (India) Vijay Sundar Prashanth	6–3, 6–1
2020–2021	Not held		
2019	(Barbados) Darian King (Canada) Peter Polansky	(Sweden) André Göransson (Netherlands) Sem Verbeek	6–4, 3–6, [12–10]
2018	(Thailand) Sanchai Ratiwatana (Indonesia) Christopher Rungkat	(Finland) Harri Heliövaara (Switzerland) Henri Laaksonen	6–0, 7–6^{(11–9)}
2017	(United Kingdom) Luke Bambridge (Republic of Ireland) David O'Hare	(Egypt) Akram El Sallaly (Brazil) Bernardo Oliveira	6–4, 6–2
2016	(United States) Brian Baker (United States) Mackenzie McDonald	(United States) Sekou Bangoura (United States) Eric Quigley	6–3, 6–4
2015	(Sweden) Johan Brunström (Denmark) Frederik Nielsen	(Australia) Carsten Ball (Germany) Dustin Brown	6–3, 5–7, [10–5]
