= 2024 Southern California Open – Singles =

Singles
- 2024 Southern California Open

Final
- Champion: (United States) Mitchell Krueger
- Runner-up: (United States) Brandon Holt
- Score: 4–6, 6–3, 6–4

Events
Singles	Doubles
Southern California Open	· 2024 →

This was the first edition of the tournament.

Mitchell Krueger won the title after defeating Brandon Holt 4–6, 6–3, 6–4 in the final.

== Seeds ==
1. (Italy) Federico Gaio (first round)
2. (Argentina) Marco Trungelliti (quarterfinals)
3. (United States) Brandon Holt (final)
4. (United States) Mitchell Krueger (champion)
5. (United States) Aidan Mayo (first round)
6. (United States) Thai-Son Kwiatkowski (semifinals)
7. (France) Gabriel Debru (first round)
8. (Germany) Sebastian Fanselow (first round)

== Draw ==
=== Key ===
- Q = Qualifier
- WC = Wild card
- LL = Lucky loser
- Alt = Alternate
- SE = Special exempt
- PR = Protected ranking
- ITF = ITF entry
- JE = Junior exempt
- w/o = Walkover
- r = Retired
- d = Defaulted
- SR = Special ranking

=== Finals ===
Semifinals
PR	(United Kingdom) Paul Jubb	4	4
4	(United States) Mitchell Krueger	6	6
3/WC	(United States) Brandon Holt	6	5	7^{7}
6	(United States) Thai-Son Kwiatkowski	2	7	6^{3}

Final
4	(United States) Mitchell Krueger	4	6	6
3/WC	(United States) Brandon Holt	6	3	4

=== Top half ===
First round
1	(Italy) F Gaio	3	2
(United States) O Kumar	6	6
(United States) N Basavareddy	6	6
WC	(United States) M Cassone	2	2
PR	(United Kingdom) P Jubb	6	6
Q	(United Kingdom) Patrick Brady	3	0
Q	(United States) S Kozlov	6	3	6
7	(France) G Debru	1	6	2
4	(United States) M Krueger	6	7^{7}
Q	(Chile) M Soto	4	6^{3}
(Zimbabwe) B Lock	6	6
(Germany) Lucas Gerch	3	1
Q	(United States) Maxwell McKennon	2	6	0
(United States) L Tien	6	3	6
(Italy) G Oradini	6	7^{7}
8	(Germany) S Fanselow	3	6^{1}

Second round
(United States) O Kumar	4	6	6
(United States) N Basavareddy	6	4	2
PR	(United Kingdom) P Jubb	4	6	6
Q	(United States) S Kozlov	6	3	3
4	(United States) M Krueger	6	6
(Zimbabwe) B Lock	4	4
(United States) L Tien	6	7^{7}
(Italy) G Oradini	2	6^{1}

Quarterfinals
(United States) O Kumar	7^{8}	4	1
PR	(United Kingdom) P Jubb	6^{6}	6	6
4	(United States) M Krueger	6	7^{8}
(United States) L Tien	4	6^{6}

Semifinals
PR	(United Kingdom) P Jubb	4	4
4	(United States) M Krueger	6	6

=== Bottom half ===
First round
5	(United States) A Mayo	6^{5}	2
(Japan) J Trotter	7^{7}	6
(Canada) V Pospisil	6	1	4
(Israel) D Cukierman	3	6	6
(United States) S Kirchheimer	6	5
Q	(New Zealand) A Rai	2	2^{d}
(Jamaica) B Bicknell	2	7	2
3/WC	(United States) B Holt	6	5	6
6	(United States) T-S Kwiatkowski	6	7^{8}
(United States) B Kuzuhara	3	6^{6}
Q	(United States) J Tracy	3	4
(Germany) T Handel	6	6
(United States) E Zhu	5	2
WC	(United States) R Seggerman	7	6
(Israel) Y Oliel	3	1
2	(Argentina) M Trungelliti	6	6

Second round
(Japan) J Trotter	4	4
(Israel) D Cukierman	6	6
(United States) S Kirchheimer	3	3
3/WC	(United States) B Holt	6	6
6	(United States) T-S Kwiatkowski	6	7^{8}
(Germany) T Handel	3	6^{6}
WC	(United States) R Seggerman	5	6	6^{4}
2	(Argentina) M Trungelliti	7	3	7^{7}

Quarterfinals
(Israel) D Cukierman	2	6	0
3/WC	(United States) B Holt	6	3	6
6	(United States) T-S Kwiatkowski	7	6
2	(Argentina) M Trungelliti	5	3

Semifinals
3/WC	(United States) B Holt	6	5	7^{7}
6	(United States) T-S Kwiatkowski	2	7	6^{3}
