= 2024 Southern California Open II – Singles =

Singles
- 2024 Southern California Open II

Final
- Champion: (Jamaica) Blaise Bicknell
- Runner-up: (United States) Zachary Svajda
- Score: 6–3, 6–2

Events
Singles	Doubles
- Southern California Open

Mitchell Krueger was the defending champion but lost in the second round to Bor Artnak.

Blaise Bicknell won the title after defeating Zachary Svajda 6–3, 6–2 in the final.

== Seeds ==
1. (United States) Zachary Svajda (final)
2. (Italy) Federico Gaio (first round)
3. (Argentina) Marco Trungelliti (second round)
4. (United States) Brandon Holt (quarterfinals, retired)
5. (United States) Tennys Sandgren (first round)
6. (United States) Mitchell Krueger (second round)
7. (United States) Aidan Mayo (first round)
8. (United States) Thai-Son Kwiatkowski (quarterfinals)

== Draw ==
Key

- Q = Qualifier
- WC = Wild card
- LL = Lucky loser
- Alt = Alternate
- ITF = ITF entry
- PR = Protected ranking
- SR = Special ranking
- SE = Special exempt
- JE = Junior exempt
- JR = Junior Accelerator Programme entrant
- CO = College Accelerator Programme entrant
- NG = Next Gen Accelerator Program entrant
- w/o = Walkover
- r = Retired
- d = Defaulted

=== Finals ===
Semifinals
1/WC	(United States) Zachary Svajda	6	6
(Germany) Sebastian Fanselow	2	4
(Jamaica) Blaise Bicknell	7^{7}	6
Q	(United States) Andre Ilagan	6^{5}	4

Final
1/WC	(United States) Zachary Svajda	3	2
(Jamaica) Blaise Bicknell	6	6

=== Top half ===
First round
1/WC	(United States) Z Svajda	6	6
(France) G Debru	4	1
(United States) E Zhu	4	4
(United States) S Kirchheimer	6	6
Q	(Slovenia) B Artnak	6	7
Alt	(Japan) J Trotter	3	5
(United States) O Kumar	6^{2}	3
6	(United States) M Krueger	7^{7}	6
3	(Argentina) M Trungelliti	6	6
(Germany) Lucas Gerch	2	3
(Italy) G Oradini	2	3
Alt	(United States) L Tien	6	6
(Germany) S Fanselow	6	7
Alt	(Canada) V Pospisil	2	5
WC	(United States) T Svajda	0	7^{7}	7^{7}
5	(United States) T Sandgren	6	6^{4}	6^{3}

Second round
1/WC	(United States) Z Svajda	6	6
(United States) S Kirchheimer	2	1
Q	(Slovenia) B Artnak	6	6
6	(United States) M Krueger	2	3
3	(Argentina) M Trungelliti	2	0
Alt	(United States) L Tien	6	6
(Germany) S Fanselow	6	6
WC	(United States) T Svajda	4	4

Quarterfinals
1/WC	(United States) Z Svajda	6	3	6
Q	(Slovenia) B Artnak	2	6	0
Alt	(United States) L Tien	6^{4}	7	4
(Germany) S Fanselow	7^{7}	5	6

Semifinals
1/WC	(United States) Z Svajda	6	6
(Germany) S Fanselow	2	4

=== Bottom half ===
First round
7	(United States) A Mayo	3	4
(Jamaica) B Bicknell	6	6
(Zimbabwe) B Lock	6	6^{3}	0
(Israel) Y Oliel	3	7^{7}	6
Q	(United States) B Kuzuhara	7^{7}	0	6
(Croatia) M Pecotić	6^{5}	6	2
WC	(United States) R Seggerman	3	4
4	(United States) B Holt	6	6
8	(United States) T-S Kwiatkowski	6	6
Q	(United States) Maxwell McKennon	4	3
PR	(United Kingdom) P Jubb	7^{7}	6
Q	(United States) O Baris	6^{1}	2
(Germany) T Handel	6	6
Q	(Chile) M Soto	4	4
Q	(United States) Andre Ilagan	6	7
2	(Italy) F Gaio	2	5

Second round
(Jamaica) B Bicknell	7	6
(Israel) Y Oliel	5	3
Q	(United States) B Kuzuhara	3	1
4	(United States) B Holt	6	6
8	(United States) T-S Kwiatkowski	7	4	6
PR	(United Kingdom) P Jubb	5	6	3
(Germany) T Handel	4	4
Q	(United States) A Ilagan	6	6

Quarterfinals
(Jamaica) B Bicknell	6	2
4	(United States) B Holt	3	2^{r}
8	(United States) T-S Kwiatkowski	6	6^{5}	3
Q	(United States) A Ilagan	1	7^{7}	6

Semifinals
(Jamaica) B Bicknell	7^{7}	6
Q	(United States) A Ilagan	6^{5}	4
