= 2024 Winston-Salem Open – Singles =

Singles
- 2024 Winston-Salem Open

Final
- Champion: (Italy) Lorenzo Sonego
- Runner-up: (United States) Alex Michelsen
- Score: 6–0, 6–3

Details
- Draw: 48 (4 Q / 4 WC )
- Seeds: 16

Events
Singles	Doubles
← 2023 ·	Winston-Salem Open	· 2025 →

Lorenzo Sonego won the singles title at the 2024 Winston-Salem Open, defeating Alex Michelsen in the final, 6–0, 6–3. He did not drop a set and did drop serve once en route to his fourth ATP Tour title, and first since 2022.

Sebastián Báez was the defending champion, but lost to Borna Ćorić in the second round.

== Seeds ==
All seeds received a bye into the second round.

1. (Argentina) Sebastián Báez (second round)
2. (United Kingdom) Jack Draper (withdrew)
3. (Argentina) Francisco Cerúndolo (second round)
4. (France) Adrian Mannarino (second round)
5. (Italy) Luciano Darderi (second round)
6. (Argentina) Tomás Martín Etcheverry (second round)
7. (Argentina) Mariano Navone (second round)
8. (Portugal) Nuno Borges (second round)
9. (Hungary) Fábián Marozsán (second round)
10. (Italy) Lorenzo Sonego (champion)
11. (United States) Alex Michelsen (final)
12. (France) Arthur Rinderknech (third round)
13. (Kazakhstan) Alexander Shevchenko (second round)
14. (France) Hugo Gaston (second round)
15. Pavel Kotov (quarterfinals)
16. (Australia) Rinky Hijikata (quarterfinals)
17. Roman Safiullin (third round)

Click on the seed number of a player to go to their draw section.

== Draw ==
=== Key ===
- Q = Qualifier
- WC = Wild card
- LL = Lucky loser
- Alt = Alternate
- ITF = ITF entry
- PR = Protected ranking
- SR = Special ranking
- SE = Special exempt
- JE = Junior exempt
- JR = Junior Accelerator Programme entrant
- CO = College Accelerator Programme entrant
- NG = Next Gen Accelerator Program entrant
- w/o = Walkover
- r = Retired
- d = Defaulted

=== Finals ===
Quarterfinals
16	(Australia) Rinky Hijikata	1	3
(Belgium) David Goffin	6	6
15	Pavel Kotov	3	5
10	(Italy) Lorenzo Sonego	6	7
Q	(United States) Learner Tien	4	2
WC	(Spain) Pablo Carreño Busta	6	6
11	(United States) Alex Michelsen	7	6^{6}	7^{7}
WC	(United States) Christopher Eubanks	5	7^{8}	6^{5}

Semifinals
(Belgium) David Goffin	3	2
10	(Italy) Lorenzo Sonego	6	6
WC	(Spain) Pablo Carreño Busta	6^{5}	1^{r}
11	(United States) Alex Michelsen	7^{7}	2

Final
10	(Italy) Lorenzo Sonego	6	6
11	(United States) Alex Michelsen	0	3

=== Top half ===
==== Section 1 ====
First round
(Croatia) B Ćorić	6	6
(India) S Nagal	4	2
(Netherlands) B van de Zandschulp	1	6^{3}
(France) A Cazaux	6	7^{7}
(Australia) C O'Connell	7	6
Q	(United States) S Kirchheimer	5	4
(Belgium) D Goffin	7	4	6
(Spain) J Munar	5	6	3

Second round
1	(Argentina) S Báez	3	4
(Croatia) B Ćorić	6	6
(France) A Cazaux	6	3	6^{4}
16	(Australia) R Hijikata	4	6	7^{7}
12	(France) A Rinderknech	6	6
(Australia) C O'Connell	3	4
(Belgium) D Goffin	6	6
5	(Italy) L Darderi	2	4

Third round
(Croatia) B Ćorić	6	3	5
16	(Australia) R Hijikata	3	6	7
12	(France) A Rinderknech	3	3
(Belgium) D Goffin	6	6

Quarterfinals
16	(Australia) R Hijikata	1	3
(Belgium) D Goffin	6	6

==== Section 2 ====
First round
(Serbia) L Djere	4	1
LL	(United States) Z Svajda	6	6
Alt	(France) A Müller	6	6
(France) C Lestienne	3	2
(Argentina) F Coria	5	2
PR	(Switzerland) D Stricker	7	6
(Argentina) F Comesaña	2	1
(China) J Shang	6	6

Second round
3/WC	(Argentina) F Cerúndolo	4	4
LL	(United States) Z Svajda	6	6
Alt	(France) A Müller	4	7	2
15	P Kotov	6	5	6
10	(Italy) L Sonego	6	6
PR	(Switzerland) D Stricker	4	1
(China) J Shang	7	6
7	(Argentina) M Navone	5	3

Third round
LL	(United States) Z Svajda	6	3	4
15	P Kotov	3	6	6
10	(Italy) L Sonego	w/o
(China) J Shang

Quarterfinals
15	P Kotov	3	5
10	(Italy) L Sonego	6	7

=== Bottom half ===
==== Section 3 ====
First round
(Brazil) T Seyboth Wild	3	6	6
(Australia) J Duckworth	6	3	4
Q	(United States) L Tien	3	6	6
Q	(Australia) T Schoolkate	6	2	3
Q	(United States) O Kumar	2	0
WC	(Spain) P Carreño Busta	6	6
(United Kingdom) D Evans	6	4	1
(Australia) A Vukic	2	6	6

Second round
8	(Portugal) N Borges	6^{2}	2
(Brazil) T Seyboth Wild	7^{7}	6
Q	(United States) L Tien	6	6^{1}	7^{7}
9	(Hungary) F Marozsán	2	7^{7}	6^{2}
13	(Kazakhstan) A Shevchenko	2	2
WC	(Spain) P Carreño Busta	6	6
(Australia) A Vukic	7^{7}	2	6
4	(France) A Mannarino	6^{5}	6	1

Third round
(Brazil) T Seyboth Wild	4	3
Q	(United States) L Tien	6	6
WC	(Spain) P Carreño Busta	6	4	6
(Australia) A Vukic	3	6	3

Quarterfinals
Q	(United States) L Tien	4	2
WC	(Spain) P Carreño Busta	6	6

==== Section 4 ====
First round
(Belgium) Z Bergs	6	3	7^{7}
WC	(United States) R Opelka	4	6	6^{1}
(Japan) T Daniel	6	1	2
(Hungary) M Fucsovics	4	6	6
WC	(United States) C Eubanks	2	7	6
(Australia) A Walton	6	5	4
LL	(Colombia) N Mejía	6^{5}	1
(France) C Moutet	7^{7}	6

Second round
6	(Argentina) TM Etcheverry	6	5	3
(Belgium) Z Bergs	4	7	6
(Hungary) M Fucsovics	6^{3}	4
11	(United States) A Michelsen	7^{7}	6
14	(France) H Gaston	1	4
WC	(United States) C Eubanks	6	6
(France) C Moutet	1	5
17	R Safiullin	6	7

Third round
(Belgium) Z Bergs	1	2
11	(United States) A Michelsen	6	6
WC	(United States) C Eubanks	6	1	7^{10}
17	R Safiullin	3	6	6^{8}

Quarterfinals
11	(United States) A Michelsen	7	6^{6}	7^{7}
WC	(United States) C Eubanks	5	7^{8}	6^{5}

== Qualifying ==
=== Seeds ===
1. (France) Alexandre Müller (moved to main draw)
2. (United States) Zachary Svajda (qualifying competition, lucky loser)
3. (Australia) Tristan Schoolkate (qualified)
4. (United States) Learner Tien (qualified)
5. (Colombia) Nicolás Mejía (qualifying competition, lucky loser)
6. (United States) Thai-Son Kwiatkowski (qualifying competition)
7. Alexey Zakharov (first round)
8. (United States) Ryan Seggerman (first round)

=== Qualifiers ===
1. (United States) Strong Kirchheimer
2. (United States) Omni Kumar
3. (Australia) Tristan Schoolkate
4. (United States) Learner Tien

=== Lucky losers ===
1. (United States) Zachary Svajda
2. (Colombia) Nicolás Mejía

=== Draw ===
==== First qualifier ====
First round
Alt	(United States) Ryan Fishback	1	5
Alt	(United States) Strong Kirchheimer	6	7
Alt	(Tunisia) Skander Mansouri	6^{7}	6	6^{5}
6	(United States) Thai-Son Kwiatkowski	7^{9}	4	7^{7}

Qualifying competition
Alt	(United States) Strong Kirchheimer	6	6
6	(United States) Thai-Son Kwiatkowski	3	4

==== Second qualifier ====
First round
2	(United States) Zachary Svajda	6	6
Alt	Martin Borisiouk	1	1
(United States) Omni Kumar	6	6
8	(United States) Ryan Seggerman	1	4

Qualifying competition
2	(United States) Zachary Svajda	2	4
(United States) Omni Kumar	6	6

==== Third qualifier ====
First round
3	(Australia) Tristan Schoolkate	6	6
WC	(United Kingdom) Luca Pow	0	1
Alt	(New Zealand) Kiranpal Pannu	1	1
5	(Colombia) Nicolás Mejía	6	6

Qualifying competition
3	(Australia) Tristan Schoolkate	7^{9}	7^{8}
5	(Colombia) Nicolás Mejía	6^{7}	6^{6}

==== Fourth qualifier ====
First round
4	(United States) Learner Tien	7^{7}	6
Alt	(United States) Andres Martin	6^{2}	3
WC	(India) Dhakshineswar Suresh	7^{7}	6
7	Alexey Zakharov	6^{5}	2

Qualifying competition
4	(United States) Learner Tien	6	6
WC	(India) Dhakshineswar Suresh	3	4
