= 2022 Winston-Salem Open =

- Date: August 21–27
- Edition: 53rd
- Category: ATP Tour 250 Series
- Draw: 48S / 16D
- Surface: Hard / outdoor
- Location: Winston-Salem, North Carolina, U.S.
- Venue: Wake Forest University

Champions

Singles
- (France) Adrian Mannarino

Doubles
- (Australia) Matthew Ebden / (United Kingdom) Jamie Murray
← 2021 ·	Winston-Salem Open	· 2023 →

The 2022 Winston-Salem Open was a men's tennis tournament play on outdoor hard courts. It was the 53rd edition of the Winston-Salem Open (as successor to previous tournaments in New Haven and Long Island), and part of the ATP Tour 250 Series of the 2022 ATP Tour. It took place at Wake Forest University in Winston-Salem, North Carolina, United States, from August 21 through August 27, 2022. It was the last event on the 2022 US Open Series before the 2022 US Open.

== Champions ==
=== Singles ===
- (France) Adrian Mannarino def. (Serbia) Laslo Đere, 7–6^{(7–1)}, 6–4

=== Doubles ===
- (Australia) Matthew Ebden / (United Kingdom) Jamie Murray def. (Monaco) Hugo Nys / (Poland) Jan Zieliński, 6–4, 6–2

== Points & prize money ==
=== Point distribution ===
Event	W	F	SF	QF	Round of 16	Round of 32	Round of 48	Q	Q2	Q1
Singles	250	150	90	45	20	10	0	5	3	0
Doubles	250	150	90	45	0	—	—	—	—	—

=== Prize money ===
Event	W	F	SF	QF	Round of 16	Round of 32	Round of 48	Q2	Q1
Singles	$100,475	$57,660	$33,115	$19,125	$10,925	$6,420	$3,905	$2,070	$1,145
Doubles*	$39,530	$20,700	$11,690	$6,780	$4,000	—	—	—	—

_{*per team}

== Singles main-draw entrants ==
=== Seeds ===
Country	Player	Rank^{†}	Seed
BUL	Grigor Dimitrov	18	1
NED	Botic van de Zandschulp	24	2
~~DEN~~	~~Holger Rune~~	~~29~~	~~3~~
USA	Maxime Cressy	32	4
ITA	Lorenzo Musetti	33	5
GEO	Nikoloz Basilashvili	34	6
~~ARG~~	~~Sebastián Báez~~	~~35~~	~~7~~
ESP	Albert Ramos Viñolas	40	8
FIN	Emil Ruusuvuori	44	9
FRA	Benjamin Bonzi	48	10
	Ilya Ivashka	49	11
ESP	Pedro Martínez	53	12
GBR	Jack Draper	55	13
ITA	Lorenzo Sonego	56	14
ESP	Jaume Munar	57	15
POR	João Sousa	59	16

^{†} Rankings are as of 15 August 2022.

=== Other entrants ===
The following players received wildcard entry into the singles main draw:

- (Bulgaria) Grigor Dimitrov
- (Austria) Dominic Thiem
- (United States) J. J. Wolf
- (Sweden) Mikael Ymer

The following players received entry using a protected ranking:

- (United Kingdom) Kyle Edmund

The following players received entry from the qualifying draw:

- (Switzerland) Marc-Andrea Hüsler
- (Australia) Jason Kubler
- (United States) Emilio Nava
- (Australia) Christopher O'Connell

The following players received entry as lucky losers:

- (Japan) Taro Daniel
- (Hungary) Márton Fucsovics
- (Netherlands) Tallon Griekspoor
- (Japan) Shintaro Mochizuki
- (Greece) Michail Pervolarakis

=== Withdrawals ===
Before the tournament

- (Argentina) Sebastián Báez → replaced by (Hungary) Márton Fucsovics
- (Kazakhstan) Alexander Bublik → replaced by (France) Adrian Mannarino
- (Spain) Pablo Carreño Busta → replaced by (Japan) Taro Daniel
- (Bolivia) Hugo Dellien → replaced by (Japan) Shintaro Mochizuki
- (Argentina) Tomás Martín Etcheverry → replaced by (Greece) Michail Pervolarakis
- (United States) Marcos Giron → replaced by (Germany) Peter Gojowczyk
- (France) Quentin Halys → replaced by (United States) Denis Kudla
- (Slovakia) Alex Molčan → replaced by (Australia) John Millman
- (United States) Brandon Nakashima → replaced by (United Kingdom) Jack Draper
- (Germany) Oscar Otte → replaced by (France) Richard Gasquet
- (United States) Tommy Paul → replaced by (Serbia) Dušan Lajović
- (Denmark) Holger Rune → replaced by (Netherlands) Tallon Griekspoor
- (United States) Frances Tiafoe → replaced by (United States) Steve Johnson

== Doubles main-draw entrants ==
=== Seeds ===
Country	Player	Country	Player	Rank^{†}	Seed
CRO	Nikola Mektić	CRO	Mate Pavić	23	1
CRO	Ivan Dodig	USA	Austin Krajicek	31	2
AUS	Matthew Ebden	GBR	Jamie Murray	54	3
GBR	Lloyd Glasspool	FIN	Harri Heliövaara	56	4

^{†} Rankings are as of 15 August 2022.

=== Other entrants ===
The following pairs received wildcard entry into the doubles main draw :

- (United States) Robert Galloway / (United States) Alex Lawson
- (Tunisia) Skander Mansouri / (United States) Matthew Thomson

=== Withdrawals ===
- (El Salvador) Marcelo Arévalo / (Netherlands) Jean-Julien Rojer → replaced by (Monaco) Hugo Nys / (Poland) Jan Zieliński
- (Australia) Matthew Ebden / (Australia) Max Purcell → replaced by (Australia) Matthew Ebden / (United Kingdom) Jamie Murray
- (Mexico) Santiago González / (Argentina) Andrés Molteni → replaced by (Kazakhstan) Aleksandr Nedovyesov / (Pakistan) Aisam-ul-Haq Qureshi
- (Netherlands) Wesley Koolhof / (United Kingdom) Neal Skupski → replaced by (France) Fabrice Martin / (United Kingdom) Jonny O'Mara
- (Germany) Kevin Krawietz / (Germany) Andreas Mies → replaced by (Belgium) Sander Gillé / (Belgium) Joran Vliegen
- (United Kingdom) Jamie Murray / (Brazil) Bruno Soares → replaced by (United States) Nathaniel Lammons / (United States) Jackson Withrow
