= 2024 Southern California Open II – Doubles =

Doubles
- 2024 Southern California Open II

Final
- Champions: (United States) Ryan Seggerman (United States) Patrik Trhac
- Runners-up: (Australia) Thomas Fancutt (New Zealand) Ajeet Rai
- Score: 6–4, 3–6, [10–3]

Events
Singles	Doubles
← 2024 ·	Southern California Open	· 2025 →

Ryan Seggerman and Patrik Trhac were the defending champions and successfully defended their title, defeating Thomas Fancutt and Ajeet Rai 6–4, 3–6, [10–3] in the final.

== Seeds ==
1. (United States) Ryan Seggerman / (United States) Patrik Trhac (champions)
2. (Philippines) Ruben Gonzales / (United States) Mitchell Krueger (first round)
3. (United Kingdom) Scott Duncan / (United States) Hunter Reese (quarterfinals)
4. (Greece) Markos Kalovelonis / (Zimbabwe) Benjamin Lock (first round)

== Draw ==
Key

- Q = Qualifier
- WC = Wild card
- LL = Lucky loser
- Alt = Alternate
- ITF = ITF entry
- PR = Protected ranking
- SR = Special ranking
- SE = Special exempt
- JE = Junior exempt
- JR = Junior Accelerator Programme entrant
- CO = College Accelerator Programme entrant
- NG = Next Gen Accelerator Program entrant
- w/o = Walkover
- r = Retired
- d = Defaulted

First round
1	(United States) R Seggerman (United States) P Trhac	7^{7}	6
WC	(United States) K Smith (United States) E Zhu	6^{2}	4
(Israel) D Cukierman (Israel) R Stepanov	3	2
(United States) T-S Kwiatkowski (United States) A Lawson	6	6
4	(Greece) M Kalovelonis (Zimbabwe) B Lock	3	3
(Italy) G Oradini (Chile) M Soto	6	6
(Germany) T Handel (United States) Tennyson Whiting	6^{2}	6	[10]
(United States) Ezekiel Clark (France) G Debru	7^{7}	4	[8]
(Germany) S Fanselow (Germany) Lucas Gerch	5	6	[10]
WC	(United States) T Svajda (United States) Z Svajda	7	4	[7]
(Mexico) H Hach Verdugo (United States) T Sandgren	6	6^{6}	[9]
3	(United Kingdom) S Duncan (United States) H Reese	3	7^{8}	[11]
(United States) M Kiger (Canada) B Sigouin	4	6	[6]
(Australia) T Fancutt (New Zealand) A Rai	6	3	[10]
(United States) G Goldhoff (Japan) J Trotter	6	6
2	(Philippines) R Gonzales (United States) M Krueger	4	2

Quarterfinals
1	(United States) R Seggerman (United States) P Trhac	3	7^{8}	[10]
(United States) T-S Kwiatkowski (United States) A Lawson	6	6^{6}	[7]
(Italy) G Oradini (Chile) M Soto	7^{7}	6
(Germany) T Handel (United States) T Whiting	6^{2}	1
(Germany) S Fanselow (Germany) L Gerch	6	6
3	(United Kingdom) S Duncan (United States) H Reese	1	4
(Australia) T Fancutt (New Zealand) A Rai	7	7
(United States) G Goldhoff (Japan) J Trotter	5	5

Semifinals
1	(United States) R Seggerman (United States) P Trhac	7^{7}	6
(Italy) G Oradini (Chile) M Soto	6^{4}	3
(Germany) S Fanselow (Germany) L Gerch	3	3
(Australia) T Fancutt (New Zealand) A Rai	6	6

Final
1	(United States) R Seggerman (United States) P Trhac	6	3	[10]
(Australia) T Fancutt (New Zealand) A Rai	4	6	[3]
