= 2024 Southern California Open – Doubles =

Doubles
- 2024 Southern California Open

Final
- Champions: (United States) Ryan Seggerman (United States) Patrik Trhac
- Runners-up: (United States) Thai-Son Kwiatkowski (United States) Alex Lawson
- Score: 6–2, 7–6^{(7–3)}

Events
Singles	Doubles
Southern California Open	· 2024 →

This was the first edition of the tournament.

Ryan Seggerman and Patrik Trhac won the title after defeating Thai-Son Kwiatkowski and Alex Lawson 6–2, 7–6^{(7–3)} in the final.

== Seeds ==
1. (United States) Ryan Seggerman / (United States) Patrik Trhac (champions)
2. (Philippines) Ruben Gonzales / (United States) Mitchell Krueger (first round)
3. (Greece) Markos Kalovelonis / (Zimbabwe) Benjamin Lock (semifinals)
4. (United States) Mac Kiger / (Canada) Benjamin Sigouin (quarterfinals)

== Draw ==
Key

- Q = Qualifier
- WC = Wild card
- LL = Lucky loser
- Alt = Alternate
- ITF = ITF entry
- PR = Protected ranking
- SR = Special ranking
- SE = Special exempt
- JE = Junior exempt
- JR = Junior Accelerator Programme entrant
- CO = College Accelerator Programme entrant
- NG = Next Gen Accelerator Program entrant
- w/o = Walkover
- r = Retired
- d = Defaulted

First round
1	(United States) R Seggerman (United States) P Trhac	6	3	[10]
(Chile) G Lama (Argentina) M Trungelliti	4	6	[7]
(Israel) Y Oliel (Chile) M Soto	7^{7}	6
(United States) Ezekiel Clark (France) G Debru	6^{5}	1
3	(Greece) M Kalovelonis (Zimbabwe) B Lock	7^{7}	6
(Italy) F Gaio (Italy) G Oradini	6^{5}	3
Alt	(Germany) T Handel (United States) Tennyson Whiting	6	6
(Germany) S Fanselow (Germany) Lucas Gerch	3	1
Alt	(Barbados) D King (United States) H Reese	6	6
WC	(United States) K Smith (United States) E Zhu	1	1
Alt	(United Kingdom) Patrick Brady (Israel) E Leshem	6^{3}	2
4	(United States) M Kiger (Canada) B Sigouin	7^{7}	6
(United States) G Goldhoff (Japan) J Trotter	6	3	[6]
(United States) T-S Kwiatkowski (United States) A Lawson	3	6	[10]
(Israel) D Cukierman (Israel) R Stepanov	7^{7}	6
2	(Philippines) R Gonzales (United States) M Krueger	6^{5}	4

Quarterfinals
1	(United States) R Seggerman (United States) P Trhac	7^{7}	6^{4}	[10]
(Israel) Y Oliel (Chile) M Soto	6^{0}	7^{7}	[7]
3	(Greece) M Kalovelonis (Zimbabwe) B Lock	6	6
Alt	(Germany) T Handel (United States) T Whiting	2	2
Alt	(Barbados) D King (United States) H Reese	6	6
4	(United States) M Kiger (Canada) B Sigouin	4	4
(United States) T-S Kwiatkowski (United States) A Lawson	6	6
(Israel) D Cukierman (Israel) R Stepanov	4	4

Semifinals
1	(United States) R Seggerman (United States) P Trhac	7^{7}	4	[10]
3	(Greece) M Kalovelonis (Zimbabwe) B Lock	6^{4}	6	[3]
Alt	(Barbados) D King (United States) H Reese	4	6	[5]
(United States) T-S Kwiatkowski (United States) A Lawson	6	1	[10]

Final
1	(United States) R Seggerman (United States) P Trhac	6	7^{7}
(United States) T-S Kwiatkowski (United States) A Lawson	2	6^{3}
