= 2023 Winston-Salem Open – Singles =

Singles
- 2023 Winston-Salem Open

Final
- Champion: (Argentina) Sebastián Báez
- Runner-up: (Czech Republic) Jiří Lehečka
- Score: 6–4, 6–3

Details
- Draw: 48 (4 Q / 4 WC )
- Seeds: 16

Events
Singles	Doubles
← 2022 ·	Winston-Salem Open	· 2024 →

Sebastián Báez defeated Jiří Lehečka in the final, 6–4, 6–3 to win the singles title at the 2023 Winston-Salem Open.

Adrian Mannarino was the reigning champion, but withdrew before the tournament began.

== Seeds ==
All seeds received a bye into the second round.

1. (Croatia) Borna Ćorić (semifinals)
2. (Netherlands) Tallon Griekspoor (third round)
3. (United States) Sebastian Korda (semifinals, withdrew)
4. (Serbia) Laslo Djere (quarterfinals)
5. (Czech Republic) Jiří Lehečka (final)
6. (Argentina) Sebastián Báez (champion)
7. (France) Arthur Fils (second round)
8. (Netherlands) Botic van de Zandschulp (second round)
9. (Australia) Aleksandar Vukic (third round)
10. (Germany) Yannick Hanfmann (second round)
11. (Germany) Daniel Altmaier (withdrew)
12. (France) Richard Gasquet (quarterfinals)
13. (United States) Marcos Giron (second round)
14. (Hungary) Márton Fucsovics (third round)
15. (Austria) Sebastian Ofner (second round)
16. (Finland) Emil Ruusuvuori (withdrew)

Click on the seed number of a player to go to their draw section.

== Draw ==
=== Key ===
- Q = Qualifier
- WC = Wild card
- LL = Lucky loser
- Alt = Alternate
- ITF = ITF entry
- PR = Protected ranking
- SR = Special ranking
- SE = Special exempt
- JE = Junior exempt
- JR = Junior Accelerator Programme entrant
- CO = College Accelerator Programme entrant
- NG = Next Gen Accelerator Program entrant
- w/o = Walkover
- r = Retired
- d = Defaulted

=== Finals ===
Quarterfinals
1	(Croatia) Borna Ćorić	6	6
Alt	(Argentina) Juan Manuel Cerúndolo	3	1
4	(Serbia) Laslo Djere	3	0
6	(Argentina) Sebastián Báez	6	6
12	(France) Richard Gasquet	6	1	6^{7}
3/WC	(United States) Sebastian Korda	4	6	7^{9}
5	(Czech Republic) Jiří Lehečka	7^{7}	6
(Australia) Max Purcell	6^{4}	4

Semifinals
1	(Croatia) Borna Ćorić	3	7^{7}	6^{2}
6	(Argentina) Sebastián Báez	6	6^{4}	7^{7}
3/WC	(United States) Sebastian Korda
5	(Czech Republic) Jiří Lehečka	w/o

Final
6	(Argentina) Sebastián Báez	6	6
5	(Czech Republic) Jiří Lehečka	4	3

=== Top half ===
==== Section 1 ====
First round
Q	(Ukraine) I Marchenko	6	3	2
Alt	(Australia) R Hijikata	4	6	6
WC	(United States) M Mmoh	6	3	6
Q	(Barbados) D King	2	6	3
R Safiullin	6^{5}	6	3
Alt	(Argentina) JM Cerúndolo	7^{7}	3	6
(France) A Rinderknech	3	6^{3}
LL	(United States) O Kumar	6	7^{7}

Second round
1	(Croatia) B Ćorić	6	7^{7}
Alt	(Australia) R Hijikata	2	6^{2}
WC	(United States) M Mmoh	6	6
13	(United States) M Giron	3	4
10	(Germany) Y Hanfmann	6^{3}	7	6^{4}
Alt	(Argentina) JM Cerúndolo	7^{7}	5	7^{7}
LL	(United States) O Kumar	6	7
8	(Netherlands) B van de Zandschulp	3	5

Third round
1	(Croatia) B Ćorić	6	6^{3}	6
WC	(United States) M Mmoh	4	7^{7}	3
Alt	(Argentina) JM Cerúndolo	7	6
LL	(United States) O Kumar	5	3

Quarterfinals
1	(Croatia) B Ćorić	6	6
Alt	(Argentina) JM Cerúndolo	3	1

==== Section 2 ====
First round
(Argentina) F Díaz Acosta	4	6	6
(France) Q Halys	6	2	4
WC	(United States) A Michelsen	6	6^{3}	6
(Peru) JP Varillas	3	7^{7}	0
(France) L Van Assche	3	6	6
Q	(United States) T-S Kwiatkowski	6	3	2
(Moldova) R Albot	1	5
(Colombia) DE Galán	6	7

Second round
4	(Serbia) L Djere	6	6
(Argentina) F Díaz Acosta	3	3
WC	(United States) A Michelsen	7^{7}	7
15	(Austria) S Ofner	6^{4}	5
9	(Australia) A Vukic	6	6^{5}	6
(France) L Van Assche	3	7^{7}	3
(Colombia) DE Galán	6	4	4
6	(Argentina) S Báez	3	6	6

Third round
4	(Serbia) L Djere	6	6
WC	(United States) A Michelsen	4	4
9	(Australia) A Vukic	4	6	4
6	(Argentina) S Báez	6	4	6

Quarterfinals
4	(Serbia) L Djere	3	0
6	(Argentina) S Báez	6	6

=== Bottom half ===
==== Section 3 ====
First round
(United States) B Nakashima	6	3	7^{7}
(Australia) J Kubler	1	6	6^{3}
A Shevchenko	3	6	0^{r}
(Switzerland) M-A Hüsler	6	4	4
(China) Z Zhang	4	7^{9}	6
I Ivashka	6	6^{7}	2
(France) A Müller	4	4
(France) B Bonzi	6	6

Second round
7	(France) A Fils	7^{7}	6^{5}	2
(United States) B Nakashima	6^{5}	7^{7}	6
(Switzerland) M-A Hüsler	4	4
12	(France) R Gasquet	6	6
14	(Hungary) M Fucsovics	6	6
(China) Z Zhang	4	2
(France) B Bonzi	2	3
3/WC	(United States) S Korda	6	6

Third round
(United States) B Nakashima	6	4	4
12	(France) R Gasquet	2	6	6
14	(Hungary) M Fucsovics	6^{5}	3
3/WC	(United States) S Korda	7^{7}	6

Quarterfinals
12	(France) R Gasquet	6	1	6^{7}
3/WC	(United States) S Korda	4	6	7^{9}

==== Section 4 ====
First round
P Kotov	3	4
Q	(United States) M Krueger	6	6
(Germany) D Koepfer	6	3	7^{10}
(France) C Lestienne	4	6	6^{8}
(Australia) M Purcell	6	6
(Italy) M Cecchinato	4	1
(Portugal) N Borges	3	1
(United Kingdom) J Draper	6	6

Second round
5	(Czech Republic) J Lehečka	2	6	6
Q	(United States) M Krueger	6	2	3
(Germany) D Koepfer	6	6
LL	(United States) S Kirchheimer	3	2
LL	A Kuznetsov	4	1
(Australia) M Purcell	6	6
(United Kingdom) J Draper	6^{8}	0^{r}
2	(Netherlands) T Griekspoor	7^{10}	0

Third round
5	(Czech Republic) J Lehečka	6	3	6
(Germany) D Koepfer	3	6	4
(Australia) M Purcell	7^{7}	7^{7}
2	(Netherlands) T Griekspoor	6^{4}	6^{2}

Quarterfinals
5	(Czech Republic) J Lehečka	7^{7}	6
(Australia) M Purcell	6^{4}	4

== Qualifying ==
=== Seeds ===
1. (Australia) Adam Walton (first round)
2. (Ukraine) Illya Marchenko (qualified)
3. (United States) Mitchell Krueger (qualified)
4. (Dominican Republic) Nick Hardt (first round)
5. (United States) Nick Chappell (first round)
6. (United States) Omni Kumar (qualifying competition, lucky loser)
7. (United States) Ulises Blanch (first round)
8. (United States) Stefan Kozlov (first round)

=== Qualifiers ===
1. (Barbados) Darian King
2. (Ukraine) Illya Marchenko
3. (United States) Mitchell Krueger
4. (United States) Thai-Son Kwiatkowski

=== Lucky losers ===
1. (United States) Strong Kirchheimer
2. (United States) Omni Kumar
3. Andrey Kuznetsov

=== Draw ===
==== First qualifier ====
First round
1	(Australia) Adam Walton	5	3
Alt	(United States) Strong Kirchheimer	7	6
Alt	(Barbados) Darian King	2	6	6
7/Alt	(United States) Ulises Blanch	6	4	3

Qualifying competition
Alt	(United States) Strong Kirchheimer	6	4	6^{1}
Alt	(Barbados) Darian King	2	6	7^{7}

==== Second qualifier ====
First round
2	(Ukraine) Illya Marchenko	6	6
WC	(Italy) Filippo Moroni	3	4
WC	(Netherlands) Robin Haase	1	6	5
6	(United States) Omni Kumar	6	1	7

Qualifying competition
2	(Ukraine) Illya Marchenko	6	6
6	(United States) Omni Kumar	4	4

==== Third qualifier ====
First round
3	(United States) Mitchell Krueger	6	6
Alt	Alexey Zakharov	4	2
Alt	(Spain) Iñaki Montes de la Torre	3	6	6
8	(United States) Stefan Kozlov	6	1	3

Qualifying competition
3	(United States) Mitchell Krueger	6	6
Alt	(Spain) Iñaki Montes de la Torre	2	3

==== Fourth qualifier ====
First round
4	(Dominican Republic) Nick Hardt	6^{5}	3
PR	(United States) Thai-Son Kwiatkowski	7^{7}	6
PR	Andrey Kuznetsov	7	6
5	(United States) Nick Chappell	5	1

Qualifying competition
PR	(United States) Thai-Son Kwiatkowski	6	6
PR	Andrey Kuznetsov	1	0
