= 2023 Winston-Salem Open =

- Date: 20–26 August
- Edition: 54th
- Category: ATP Tour 250 Series
- Draw: 48S / 16D
- Surface: Hard / outdoor
- Location: Winston-Salem, North Carolina, U.S.
- Venue: Wake Forest University

Champions

Singles
- (Argentina) Sebastián Báez

Doubles
- (United States) Nathaniel Lammons / (United States) Jackson Withrow
- Winston-Salem Open

The 2023 Winston-Salem Open was a men's tennis tournament played on outdoor hard courts. It was the 54th edition of the Winston-Salem Open (as successor to previous tournaments in New Haven and Long Island), and part of the ATP Tour 250 Series of the 2023 ATP Tour. It took place at Wake Forest University in Winston-Salem, North Carolina, United States, from August 21 to August 27, 2023.

== Champions ==
=== Singles ===
- (Argentina) Sebastián Báez def. (Czech Republic) Jiří Lehečka, 6–4, 6–3

=== Doubles ===
- (United States) Nathaniel Lammons / (United States) Jackson Withrow def. (United Kingdom) Lloyd Glasspool / (United Kingdom) Neal Skupski, 6–3, 6–4

== Points & prize money ==
=== Point distribution ===
Event	W	F	SF	QF	Round of 16	Round of 32	Round of 48	Q	Q2	Q1
Singles	250	150	90	45	20	10	0	5	3	0
Doubles	250	150	90	45	0	—N/a	—N/a	—N/a	—N/a	—N/a

=== Prize money ===
Event	W	F	SF	QF	Round of 16	Round of 32	Round of 48	Q2	Q1
Singles	$104,460	$59,945	$34,430	$19,885	$11,355	$6,675	$4,060	$2,150	$1,190
Doubles*	$41,100	$21,520	$12,160	$7,060	$4,150	—N/a	—N/a	—N/a	—N/a

_{*per team}

== Singles main draw entrants ==
=== Seeds ===
Country	Player	Rank^{†}	Seed
CRO	Borna Ćorić	16	1
NED	Tallon Griekspoor	25	2
USA	Sebastian Korda	30	3
SRB	Laslo Djere	34	4
CZE	Jiří Lehečka	35	5
ARG	Sebastián Báez	42	6
FRA	Arthur Fils	45	7
NED	Botic van de Zandschulp	47	8
AUS	Aleksandar Vukic	48	9
GER	Yannick Hanfmann	50	10
~~GER~~	~~Daniel Altmaier~~	~~52~~	~~11~~
FRA	Richard Gasquet	53	12
USA	Marcos Giron	54	13
HUN	Márton Fucsovics	56	14
AUT	Sebastian Ofner	59	15
~~FIN~~	~~Emil Ruusuvuori~~	~~60~~	~~16~~

^{†} Rankings are as of 14 August 2023.

=== Other entrants ===
The following players received wildcard entry into the singles main draw:

- (United States) Sebastian Korda
- (United States) Alex Michelsen
- (United States) Michael Mmoh

The following players received entry as alternates:

- (Argentina) Juan Manuel Cerúndolo
- (Australia) Rinky Hijikata
- ~~(Austria) Dominic Thiem~~

The following players received entry from the qualifying draw:

- (Barbados) Darian King
- (United States) Mitchell Krueger
- (United States) Thai-Son Kwiatkowski
- (Ukraine) Illya Marchenko

The following players received entry as lucky losers:

- (United States) Strong Kirchheimer
- (United States) Omni Kumar
- Andrey Kuznetsov

=== Withdrawals ===
- (Germany) Daniel Altmaier → replaced by (United States) Strong Kirchheimer
- (Spain) Roberto Bautista Agut → replaced by Ilya Ivashka
- (Spain) Roberto Carballés Baena → replaced by (Argentina) Juan Manuel Cerúndolo
- (Spain) Pablo Carreño Busta → replaced by (Germany) Dominik Koepfer
- (United Kingdom) Dan Evans → replaced by (Argentina) Facundo Díaz Acosta
- (France) Adrian Mannarino → replaced by (France) Benjamin Bonzi
- (Japan) Yoshihito Nishioka → replaced by (Italy) Marco Cecchinato
- (Argentina) Guido Pella → replaced by Pavel Kotov
- (Finland) Emil Ruusuvuori → replaced by Andrey Kuznetsov
- (Germany) Jan-Lennard Struff → replaced by (France) Constant Lestienne
- (Austria) Dominic Thiem → replaced by (United States) Omni Kumar
- (Spain) Bernabé Zapata Miralles → replaced by Alexander Shevchenko

== Doubles main draw entrants ==
=== Seeds ===
Country	Player	Country	Player	Rank^{†}	Seed
USA	Rajeev Ram	GBR	Joe Salisbury	9	1
GBR	Lloyd Glasspool	GBR	Neal Skupski	24	2
MON	Hugo Nys	POL	Jan Zieliński	35	3
~~GBR~~	~~Jamie Murray~~	~~NZL~~	~~Michael Venus~~	~~55~~	~~4~~

^{†} Rankings are as of 14 August 2023.

=== Other entrants ===
The following pairs received wildcard entry into the doubles main draw :

- (Australia) Matthew Ebden / (Australia) John-Patrick Smith
- (Italy) Filippo Moroni / (United States) Matthew Thomson

The following pairs received entry as alternates:

- (India) Anirudh Chandrasekar / (India) Vijay Sundar Prashanth
- (United States) Evan King / (United States) Reese Stalder

=== Withdrawals ===
- (El Salvador) Marcelo Arévalo / (Netherlands) Jean-Julien Rojer → replaced by (Brazil) Marcelo Demoliner / (Netherlands) Matwé Middelkoop
- (India) Rohan Bopanna / (Australia) Matthew Ebden → replaced by (Monaco) Romain Arneodo / (Uruguay) Ariel Behar
- (France) Sadio Doumbia / (France) Fabien Reboul → replaced by (India) Anirudh Chandrasekar / (India) Vijay Sundar Prashanth
- (United Kingdom) Lloyd Glasspool / (Finland) Harri Heliövaara → replaced by (United Kingdom) Lloyd Glasspool / (United Kingdom) Neal Skupski
- (Argentina) Máximo González / (Argentina) Andrés Molteni → replaced by (Ecuador) Gonzalo Escobar / (Kazakhstan) Aleksandr Nedovyesov
- (Mexico) Santiago González / (France) Édouard Roger-Vasselin → replaced by (Portugal) Francisco Cabral / (Brazil) Rafael Matos
- (Brazil) Marcelo Melo / (Australia) John Peers → replaced by (Austria) Sebastian Ofner / (Australia) Max Purcell
- (United Kingdom) Jamie Murray / (New Zealand) Michael Venus → replaced by (United States) Evan King / (United States) Reese Stalder
