= 2022 Winston-Salem Open – Singles =

Singles
- 2022 Winston-Salem Open

Final
- Champion: (France) Adrian Mannarino
- Runner-up: (Serbia) Laslo Đere
- Score: 7–6^{(7–1)}, 6–4

Details
- Draw: 48 (4 Q / 4 WC )
- Seeds: 16

Events
Singles	Doubles
← 2021 ·	Winston-Salem Open	· 2023 →

Adrian Mannarino defeated Laslo Đere in the final, 7–6^{(7–1)}, 6–4 to win the singles tennis title at the 2022 Winston-Salem Open. Mannarino saved four match points en route to the title, in his first-round match against Christopher O'Connell.

Ilya Ivashka was the defending champion, but lost in the third round to Marc-Andrea Hüsler.

== Seeds ==
All seeds receive a bye into the second round.

1. (Bulgaria) Grigor Dimitrov (second round, retired)
2. (Netherlands) Botic van de Zandschulp (semifinals)
3. (Denmark) Holger Rune (withdrew)
4. (United States) Maxime Cressy (quarterfinals)
5. (Italy) Lorenzo Musetti (second round)
6. (Georgia (country)) Nikoloz Basilashvili (second round)
7. (Argentina) Sebastián Báez (withdrew)
8. (Spain) Albert Ramos Viñolas (third round)

9. (Finland) Emil Ruusuvuori (second round)
10. (France) Benjamin Bonzi (quarterfinals)
11. Ilya Ivashka (third round)
12. (Spain) Pedro Martínez (second round)
13. (United Kingdom) Jack Draper (quarterfinals)
14. (Italy) Lorenzo Sonego (third round)
15. (Spain) Jaume Munar (third round)
16. (Portugal) João Sousa (second round)

Click on the seed number of a player to go to their draw section.

== Draw ==
=== Key ===
- Q = Qualifier
- WC = Wild card
- LL = Lucky loser
- Alt = Alternate
- SE = Special exempt
- PR = Protected ranking
- ITF = ITF entry
- JE = Junior exempt
- w/o = Walkover
- r = Retired
- d = Defaulted
- SR = Special ranking

=== Finals ===
Quarterfinals
13	(United Kingdom) Jack Draper	4	4
Q	(Switzerland) Marc-Andrea Hüsler	6	6
(Serbia) Laslo Đere	6	3	7^{8}
(France) Richard Gasquet	4	6	6^{6}
(France) Adrian Mannarino	6	7^{7}
4	(United States) Maxime Cressy	4	6^{3}
10	(France) Benjamin Bonzi	6^{6}	6^{1}
2	(Netherlands) Botic van de Zandschulp	7^{8}	7^{7}

Semifinals
Q	(Switzerland) Marc-Andrea Hüsler	6^{3}	6^{5}
(Serbia) Laslo Đere	7^{7}	7^{7}
(France) Adrian Mannarino	6	6
2	(Netherlands) Botic van de Zandschulp	0	4

Final
(Serbia) Laslo Đere	6^{1}	4
(France) Adrian Mannarino	7^{7}	6

=== Top half ===
==== Section 1 ====
First round
WC	(Austria) D Thiem	6^{5}	7	7^{8}
WC	(United States) J. J. Wolf	7^{7}	5	6^{6}
(Italy) F Fognini	7	7
(Serbia) D Lajović	5	5
(Czech Republic) J Lehečka	4	3
(Germany) P Gojowczyk	6	6
WC	(Sweden) M Ymer	6	6
(Argentina) F Coria	2	3

Second round
1/WC	(Bulgaria) G Dimitrov	6	2^{r}
WC	(Austria) D Thiem	0	4
(Italy) F Fognini	2	6	1
13	(United Kingdom) J Draper	6	4	6
11	I Ivashka	6	6
(Germany) P Gojowczyk	4	2
WC	(Sweden) M Ymer	4	4
Q	(Switzerland) M-A Hüsler	6	6

Third round
WC	(Austria) D Thiem	1	4
13	(United Kingdom) J Draper	6	6
11	I Ivashka	6^{2}	6	6^{3}
Q	(Switzerland) M-A Hüsler	7^{7}	3	7^{7}

Quarterfinals
13	(United Kingdom) J Draper	4	4
Q	(Switzerland) M-A Hüsler	6	6

==== Section 2 ====
First round
(South Korea) S-w Kwon	6	6
(Germany) D Altmaier	1	4
(Serbia) L Đere	6	3	6
(Belgium) D Goffin	3	6	3
Q	(United States) E Nava	3	2
(United States) S Johnson	6	6
(France) R Gasquet	6^{5}	6	1
(Poland) K Majchrzak	7^{7}	2	0^{r}

Second round
Q	(Australia) J Kubler	7	6
(South Korea) S-w Kwon	5	2
(Serbia) L Đere	4	6	7^{7}
16	(Portugal) J Sousa	6	3	6^{5}
12	(Spain) P Martínez	6^{2}	2
(United States) S Johnson	7^{7}	6
(France) R Gasquet	7^{7}	4	6
5	(Italy) L Musetti	6^{5}	6	1

Third round
Q	(Australia) J Kubler	6^{4}	7^{11}	3
(Serbia) L Đere	7^{7}	6^{9}	6
(United States) S Johnson	7^{7}	4	3
(France) R Gasquet	6^{3}	6	6

Quarterfinals
(Serbia) L Đere	6	3	7^{8}
(France) R Gasquet	4	6	6^{6}

=== Bottom half ===
==== Section 3 ====
First round
(Australia) J Millman	6	6
(France) H Gaston	2	3
Q	(Australia) C O'Connell	6^{4}	7^{7}	6^{3}
(France) A Mannarino	7^{7}	6^{3}	7^{7}
LL	(Japan) S Mochizuki	6	2	4
(Chile) A Tabilo	4	6	6
(Australia) T Kokkinakis	6	3	6^{5}
(Australia) J Duckworth	4	6	7^{7}

Second round
8	(Spain) A Ramos Viñolas	6	6
(Australia) J Millman	4	4
(France) A Mannarino	6	6
9	(Finland) E Ruusuvuori	4	1
14	(Italy) L Sonego	7	6
(Chile) A Tabilo	5	1
(Australia) J Duckworth	3	3
4	(United States) M Cressy	6	6

Third round
8	(Spain) A Ramos Viñolas	3	3
(France) A Mannarino	6	6
14	(Italy) L Sonego	7^{7}	2	6^{3}
4	(United States) M Cressy	6^{4}	6	7^{7}

Quarterfinals
(France) A Mannarino	6	7^{7}
4	(United States) M Cressy	4	6^{3}

==== Section 4 ====
First round
(United States) D Kudla	6^{1}	5
(Brazil) T Monteiro	7^{7}	7
LL	(Greece) M Pervolarakis	2	5
PR	(United Kingdom) K Edmund	6	7
LL	(Hungary) M Fucsovics	1	6	3
(Chinese Taipei) C-h Tseng	6	1	6
LL	(Netherlands) T Griekspoor	7^{7}	6
LL	(Japan) T Daniel	6^{3}	3

Second round
6	(Georgia (country)) N Basilashvili	4	1
(Brazil) T Monteiro	6	6
PR	(United Kingdom) K Edmund	4	6^{5}
10	(France) B Bonzi	6	7^{7}
15	(Spain) J Munar	6	6
(Chinese Taipei) C-h Tseng	3	4
LL	(Netherlands) T Griekspoor	6^{5}	3
2	(Netherlands) B van de Zandschulp	7^{7}	6

Third round
(Brazil) T Monteiro	5	2
10	(France) B Bonzi	7	6
15	(Spain) J Munar	3	3
2	(Netherlands) B van de Zandschulp	6	6

Quarterfinals
10	(France) B Bonzi	6^{6}	6^{1}
2	(Netherlands) B van de Zandschulp	7^{8}	7^{7}

== Qualifying ==
=== Seeds ===
1. (Netherlands) Tallon Griekspoor (qualifying competition, lucky loser)
2. (Hungary) Márton Fucsovics (qualifying competition, lucky loser)
3. (Japan) Taro Daniel (qualifying competition, lucky loser)
4. (Switzerland) Marc-Andrea Hüsler (qualified)
5. (Australia) Jason Kubler (qualified)
6. (Australia) Christopher O'Connell (qualified)
7. (United States) Emilio Nava (qualified)
8. (Japan) Shintaro Mochizuki (qualifying competition, lucky loser)

=== Qualifiers ===
1. (Australia) Christopher O'Connell
2. (Australia) Jason Kubler
3. (United States) Emilio Nava
4. (Switzerland) Marc-Andrea Hüsler

=== Lucky losers ===
1. (Netherlands) Tallon Griekspoor
2. (Hungary) Márton Fucsovics
3. (Japan) Shintaro Mochizuki
4. (Japan) Taro Daniel
5. (Greece) Michail Pervolarakis

=== Qualifying draw ===
==== First qualifier ====
First round
1	(Netherlands) Tallon Griekspoor	3	6	6
(Greece) Michail Pervolarakis	6	4	3
WC	(United States) Eduardo Nava	2	4
6	(Australia) Christopher O'Connell	6	6

Qualifying competition
1	(Netherlands) Tallon Griekspoor	6^{4}	6^{4}
6	(Australia) Christopher O'Connell	7^{7}	7^{7}

==== Second qualifier ====
First round
2	(Hungary) Márton Fucsovics	6	6
(United States) Andres Martin	3	3
(Spain) Iñaki Montes de la Torre	5	3
5	(Australia) Jason Kubler	7	6

Qualifying competition
2	(Hungary) Márton Fucsovics	4	0
5	(Australia) Jason Kubler	6	6

==== Third qualifier ====
First round
3	(Japan) Taro Daniel	6	6
PR	(Croatia) Matija Pecotić	1	1
Alt	(United States) Donald Young	2	2
7	(United States) Emilio Nava	6	6

Qualifying competition
3	(Japan) Taro Daniel	4	6	5
7	(United States) Emilio Nava	6	3	7

==== Fourth qualifier ====
First round
4	(Switzerland) Marc-Andrea Hüsler	6	6
Alt	(Australia) Matthew Ebden	4	3
WC	(Cyprus) Menelaos Efstathiou	3	4
8	(Japan) Shintaro Mochizuki	6	6

Qualifying competition
4	(Switzerland) Marc-Andrea Hüsler	6	6
8	(Japan) Shintaro Mochizuki	2	4
