= 2022 Winston-Salem Open – Doubles =

Doubles
- 2022 Winston-Salem Open

Final
- Champions: (Australia) Matthew Ebden (United Kingdom) Jamie Murray
- Runners-up: (Monaco) Hugo Nys (Poland) Jan Zieliński
- Score: 6–4, 6–2

Events
Singles	Doubles
- Winston-Salem Open

Matthew Ebden and Jamie Murray defeated Hugo Nys and Jan Zieliński in the final, 6–4, 6–2 to win the doubles tennis title at the 2022 Winston-Salem Open.

Marcelo Arévalo and Matwé Middelkoop were the reigning champions, but chose not to participate.

== Seeds ==
1. (Croatia) Nikola Mektić / (Croatia) Mate Pavić (quarterfinals)
2. (Croatia) Ivan Dodig / (United States) Austin Krajicek (first round)
3. (Australia) Matthew Ebden / (United Kingdom) Jamie Murray (champions)
4. (United Kingdom) Lloyd Glasspool / (Finland) Harri Heliövaara (semifinals)

== Draw ==
Key

- Q = Qualifier
- WC = Wild card
- LL = Lucky loser
- Alt = Alternate
- ITF = ITF entry
- PR = Protected ranking
- SR = Special ranking
- SE = Special exempt
- JE = Junior exempt
- JR = Junior Accelerator Programme entrant
- CO = College Accelerator Programme entrant
- NG = Next Gen Accelerator Program entrant
- w/o = Walkover
- r = Retired
- d = Defaulted

=== Draw ===
First round
1	(Croatia) N Mektić (Croatia) M Pavić	6	6
(Kazakhstan) A Nedovyesov (Pakistan) A-u-H Qureshi	4	3
(Brazil) R Matos (Spain) D Vega Hernández	3	4
(Monaco) H Nys (Poland) J Zieliński	6	6
4	(United Kingdom) L Glasspool (Finland) H Heliövaara	4	6	[10]
WC	(Tunisia) S Mansouri (United States) M Thomson	6	3	[5]
PR	(Portugal) F Cabral (Croatia) F Škugor	4	7^{7}	[10]
(Bosnia and Herzegovina) T Brkić (Argentina) M González	6	6^{5}	[8]
WC	(United States) R Galloway (United States) A Lawson	6	5	[10]
(United States) N Lammons (United States) J Withrow	3	7	[6]
(Belgium) S Gillé (Belgium) J Vliegen	6^{5}	4
3	(Australia) M Ebden (United Kingdom) J Murray	7^{7}	6
(Uruguay) A Behar (Ecuador) G Escobar	6	1	[10]
(France) F Martin (United Kingdom) J O'Mara	4	6	[7]
(Italy) S Bolelli (Brazil) M Melo	6	7^{7}
2	(Croatia) I Dodig (United States) A Krajicek	4	6^{3}

Quarterfinals
1	(Croatia) N Mektić (Croatia) M Pavić	7^{7}	6^{5}	[7]
(Monaco) H Nys (Poland) J Zieliński	6^{3}	7^{7}	[10]
4	(United Kingdom) L Glasspool (Finland) H Heliövaara	6	6
PR	(Portugal) F Cabral (Croatia) F Škugor	4	3
WC	(United States) R Galloway (United States) A Lawson	4	6	[6]
3	(Australia) M Ebden (United Kingdom) J Murray	6	3	[10]
(Uruguay) A Behar (Ecuador) G Escobar	5	5
(Italy) S Bolelli (Brazil) M Melo	7	7

Semifinals
(Monaco) H Nys (Poland) J Zieliński	6	7^{7}
4	(United Kingdom) L Glasspool (Finland) H Heliövaara	4	6^{4}
3	(Australia) M Ebden (United Kingdom) J Murray	7^{7}	6
(Italy) S Bolelli (Brazil) M Melo	6^{2}	2

Final
(Monaco) H Nys (Poland) J Zieliński	4	2
3	(Australia) M Ebden (United Kingdom) J Murray	6	6
