= 2024 Southern California Open =

- Date: 15 – 21 January
- Edition: 1st
- Surface: Hard
- Location: Indian Wells, California, United States

Champions

Singles
- (United States) Mitchell Krueger

Doubles
- (United States) Ryan Seggerman / (United States) Patrik Trhac
Southern California Open	· 2024 →

The 2024 Southern California Open was a professional tennis tournament played on hard courts. It was the 1st edition of the tournament which was part of the 2024 ATP Challenger Tour. It took place in Indian Wells, California, United States from January 15 to January 21, 2024.

== Singles main-draw entrants ==
=== Seeds ===
Country	Player	Rank^{1}	Seed
ITA	Federico Gaio	199	1
ARG	Marco Trungelliti	226	2
USA	Brandon Holt	253	3
USA	Mitchell Krueger	284	4
USA	Aidan Mayo	293	5
USA	Thai-Son Kwiatkowski	315	6
FRA	Gabriel Debru	321	7
GER	Sebastian Fanselow	324	8

- ^{1} Rankings are as of 8 January 2024.

=== Other entrants ===
The following players received wildcards into the singles main draw:

- (United States) Murphy Cassone
- (United States) Brandon Holt
- (United States) Ryan Seggerman

The following player received entry into the singles main draw using a protected ranking:

- (United Kingdom) Paul Jubb

The following players received entry from the qualifying draw:

- (United Kingdom) Patrick Brady
- (United States) Stefan Kozlov
- (United States) Maxwell McKennon
- (New Zealand) Ajeet Rai
- (Chile) Matías Soto
- (United States) James Tracy

== Champions ==
=== Singles ===
- (United States) Mitchell Krueger def. (United States) Brandon Holt 4–6, 6–3, 6–4.

=== Doubles ===
- (United States) Ryan Seggerman / (United States) Patrik Trhac def. (United States) Thai-Son Kwiatkowski / (United States) Alex Lawson 6–2, 7–6^{(7–3)}.
