= 2024 Winston-Salem Open – Doubles =

Doubles
- 2024 Winston-Salem Open

Final
- Champions: (United States) Nathaniel Lammons (United States) Jackson Withrow
- Runners-up: (United Kingdom) Julian Cash (United States) Robert Galloway
- Score: 6–4, 6–3

Events
Singles	Doubles
- Winston-Salem Open

Defending champions Nathaniel Lammons and Jackson Withrow won the doubles title at the 2024 Winston-Salem Open, defeating Julian Cash and Robert Galloway in the final, 6–4, 6–3.

== Seeds ==
1. (United Kingdom) Neal Skupski / (New Zealand) Michael Venus (first round)
2. (Netherlands) Wesley Koolhof / (Croatia) Nikola Mektić (first round)
3. (United States) Austin Krajicek / (Netherlands) Jean-Julien Rojer (first round)
4. (United States) Nathaniel Lammons / (United States) Jackson Withrow (champions)
5. (Croatia) Ivan Dodig / (Czech Republic) Adam Pavlásek (first round)
6. (Uruguay) Ariel Behar / (Argentina) Andrés Molteni (first round)
7. (Brazil) Rafael Matos / (Brazil) Marcelo Melo (quarterfinals)
8. (France) Sadio Doumbia / (United Kingdom) Lloyd Glasspool (first round)

== Draw ==
Key

- Q = Qualifier
- WC = Wild card
- LL = Lucky loser
- Alt = Alternate
- ITF = ITF entry
- PR = Protected ranking
- SR = Special ranking
- SE = Special exempt
- JE = Junior exempt
- JR = Junior Accelerator Programme entrant
- CO = College Accelerator Programme entrant
- NG = Next Gen Accelerator Program entrant
- w/o = Walkover
- r = Retired
- d = Defaulted

=== Draw ===
First round
1	(United Kingdom) N Skupski (New Zealand) M Venus	6	3	[7]
WC	(Colombia) N Barrientos (Tunisia) S Mansouri	4	6	[10]
(United Kingdom) J Murray (Australia) J Peers	6	6
5	(Croatia) I Dodig (Czech Republic) A Pavlásek	4	4
3	(United States) A Krajicek (Netherlands) J-J Rojer	6^{7}	7^{7}	[3]
(Germany) C Frantzen (Germany) H Jebens	7^{9}	6^{5}	[10]
(United Kingdom) J Cash (United States) R Galloway	6	6
8	(France) S Doumbia (United Kingdom) L Glasspool	3	4
7	(Brazil) R Matos (Brazil) M Melo	7	6
(Austria) A Erler (Netherlands) R Haase	5	4
(Portugal) N Borges (Italy) L Darderi	1	7^{7}	[7]
4	(United States) N Lammons (United States) J Withrow	6	6^{4}	[10]
6	(Uruguay) A Behar (Argentina) A Molteni	4	7	[8]
WC	(United Kingdom) L Pow (India) D Suresh	6	5	[10]
Alt	(Ecuador) G Escobar (Kazakhstan) A Nedovyesov	7^{7}	6^{4}	[11]
2	(Netherlands) W Koolhof (Croatia) N Mektić	6^{1}	7^{7}	[9]

Quarterfinals
WC	(Colombia) N Barrientos (Tunisia) S Mansouri	6^{6}	3
(United Kingdom) J Murray (Australia) J Peers	7^{8}	6
(Germany) C Frantzen (Germany) H Jebens	3	4
(United Kingdom) J Cash (United States) R Galloway	6	6
7	(Brazil) R Matos (Brazil) M Melo	6^{1}	7^{7}	[9]
4	(United States) N Lammons (United States) J Withrow	7^{7}	6^{4}	[11]
WC	(United Kingdom) L Pow (India) D Suresh	6	4	[10]
Alt	(Ecuador) G Escobar (Kazakhstan) A Nedovyesov	1	6	[8]

Semifinals
(United Kingdom) J Murray (Australia) J Peers	7	5	[8]
(United Kingdom) J Cash (United States) R Galloway	5	7	[10]
4	(United States) N Lammons (United States) J Withrow	6	6
WC	(United Kingdom) L Pow (India) D Suresh	4	2

Final
(United Kingdom) J Cash (United States) R Galloway	4	3
4	(United States) N Lammons (United States) J Withrow	6	6
