= 2024 Southern California Open II =

- Date: 22 – 28 January
- Edition: 2nd
- Surface: Hard
- Location: Indian Wells, California, United States

Champions

Singles
- (Jamaica) Blaise Bicknell

Doubles
- (United States) Ryan Seggerman / (United States) Patrik Trhac
← 2024 ·	Southern California Open	· 2025 →

The 2024 Southern California Open II was a professional tennis tournament played on hard courts. It was the second edition of the tournament which was part of the 2024 ATP Challenger Tour. It took place in Indian Wells, California, United States from January 22 to January 28, 2024.

== Singles main-draw entrants ==
=== Seeds ===
Country	Player	Rank^{1}	Seed
USA	Zachary Svajda	143	1
ITA	Federico Gaio	198	2
ARG	Marco Trungelliti	224	3
USA	Brandon Holt	244	4
USA	Tennys Sandgren	266	5
USA	Mitchell Krueger	286	6
USA	Aidan Mayo	298	7
USA	Thai-Son Kwiatkowski	316	8

- ^{1} Rankings are as of 15 January 2024.

=== Other entrants ===
The following players received wildcards into the singles main draw:

- (United States) Ryan Seggerman
- (United States) Trevor Svajda
- (United States) Zachary Svajda

The following player received entry into the singles main draw using a protected ranking:

- (United Kingdom) Paul Jubb

The following players received entry into the singles main draw as alternates:

- (Canada) Vasek Pospisil
- (United States) Learner Tien
- (Japan) James Trotter

The following players received entry from the qualifying draw:

- (Slovenia) Bor Artnak
- (United States) Ozan Baris
- (United States) Andre Ilagan
- (United States) Bruno Kuzuhara
- (United States) Maxwell McKennon
- (Chile) Matías Soto

== Champions ==
=== Singles ===
- (Jamaica) Blaise Bicknell def. (United States) Zachary Svajda 6–3, 6–2.

=== Doubles ===
- (United States) Ryan Seggerman / (United States) Patrik Trhac def. (Australia) Thomas Fancutt / (New Zealand) Ajeet Rai 6–4, 3–6, [10–3].
