= 2023 Winston-Salem Open – Doubles =

Doubles
- 2023 Winston-Salem Open

Final
- Champions: (United States) Nathaniel Lammons (United States) Jackson Withrow
- Runners-up: (United Kingdom) Lloyd Glasspool (United Kingdom) Neal Skupski
- Score: 6–3, 6–4

Events
Singles	Doubles
- Winston-Salem Open

Nathaniel Lammons and Jackson Withrow defeated Lloyd Glasspool and Neal Skupski in the final, 6–3, 6–4 to win the doubles title at the 2023 Winston-Salem Open.

Matthew Ebden and Jamie Murray were the reigning champions, but chose not to participate together. Ebden partnered John-Patrick Smith, but lost in the quarterfinals to Glasspool and Skupski. Murray was scheduled to partner Michael Venus, but they withdrew before their first round match.

Skupski became the sole holder of the ATP No. 1 doubles ranking at the end of the tournament, after he won three matches without his co-number one and regular partner Wesley Koolhof.

== Seeds ==
1. (United States) Rajeev Ram / (United Kingdom) Joe Salisbury (first round)
2. (United Kingdom) Lloyd Glasspool / (United Kingdom) Neal Skupski (final)
3. (Monaco) Hugo Nys / (Poland) Jan Zieliński (semifinals)
4. (United Kingdom) Jamie Murray / (New Zealand) Michael Venus (withdrew)

== Draw ==
Key

- Q = Qualifier
- WC = Wild card
- LL = Lucky loser
- Alt = Alternate
- ITF = ITF entry
- PR = Protected ranking
- SR = Special ranking
- SE = Special exempt
- JE = Junior exempt
- JR = Junior Accelerator Programme entrant
- CO = College Accelerator Programme entrant
- NG = Next Gen Accelerator Program entrant
- w/o = Walkover
- r = Retired
- d = Defaulted

=== Draw ===
First round
1	(United States) R Ram (United Kingdom) J Salisbury	6^{0}	6^{4}
(United States) N Lammons (United States) J Withrow	7^{7}	7^{7}
(Portugal) F Cabral (Brazil) R Matos	6^{8}	6^{6}
(Italy) S Bolelli (Croatia) M Pavić	7^{10}	7^{8}
3	(Monaco) H Nys (Poland) J Zieliński	6	6
(Austria) A Erler (Austria) L Miedler	2	4
(Ecuador) G Escobar (Kazakhstan) A Nedovyesov	6	6
(Austria) S Ofner (Australia) M Purcell	2	1
(Brazil) M Demoliner (Netherlands) M Middelkoop	6	7^{7}
(Netherlands) R Haase (Croatia) N Mektić	4	6^{4}
(Monaco) R Arneodo (Uruguay) A Behar	4	6	[10]
Alt	(United States) E King (United States) R Stalder	6	4	[7]
Alt	(India) A Chandrasekar (India) VS Prashanth	4	0
WC	(Australia) M Ebden (Australia) J-P Smith	6	6
WC	(Italy) F Moroni (United States) M Thomson	6^{4}	2
2	(United Kingdom) L Glasspool (United Kingdom) N Skupski	7^{7}	6

Quarterfinals
(United States) N Lammons (United States) J Withrow	6	6
(Italy) S Bolelli (Croatia) M Pavić	3	4
3	(Monaco) H Nys (Poland) J Zieliński	6	6
(Ecuador) G Escobar (Kazakhstan) A Nedovyesov	3	3
(Brazil) M Demoliner (Netherlands) M Middelkoop	6	7
(Monaco) R Arneodo (Uruguay) A Behar	2	5
WC	(Australia) M Ebden (Australia) J-P Smith	5	6	[9]
2	(United Kingdom) L Glasspool (United Kingdom) N Skupski	7	4	[11]

Semifinals
(United States) N Lammons (United States) J Withrow	7^{7}	6
3	(Monaco) H Nys (Poland) J Zieliński	6^{4}	4
(Brazil) M Demoliner (Netherlands) M Middelkoop	7^{7}	2	[8]
2	(United Kingdom) L Glasspool (United Kingdom) N Skupski	6^{5}	6	[10]

Final
(United States) N Lammons (United States) J Withrow	6	6
2	(United Kingdom) L Glasspool (United Kingdom) N Skupski	3	4
