= 2021 Winston-Salem Open – Doubles =

Doubles
- 2021 Winston-Salem Open

Final
- Champions: (El Salvador) Marcelo Arévalo (Netherlands) Matwé Middelkoop
- Runners-up: (Croatia) Ivan Dodig (United States) Austin Krajicek
- Score: 6–7^{(5–7)}, 7–5, [10–6]

Events
Singles	Doubles
- Winston-Salem Open

Łukasz Kubot and Marcelo Melo were the reigning champions from when the tournament was last held in 2019, but lost in the semifinals to Ivan Dodig and Austin Krajicek.

Marcelo Arévalo and Matwé Middelkoop won the title, defeating Dodig and Krajicek in the final, 6–7^{(5–7)}, 7–5, [10–6].

== Seeds ==
1. (Poland) Łukasz Kubot / (Brazil) Marcelo Melo (semifinals)
2. (France) Nicolas Mahut / (France) Fabrice Martin (quarterfinals, withdrew)
3. (South Africa) Raven Klaasen / (Japan) Ben McLachlan (first round)
4. (Italy) Simone Bolelli / (Argentina) Máximo González (first round)

== Draw ==
Key

- Q = Qualifier
- WC = Wild card
- LL = Lucky loser
- Alt = Alternate
- ITF = ITF entry
- PR = Protected ranking
- SR = Special ranking
- SE = Special exempt
- JE = Junior exempt
- JR = Junior Accelerator Programme entrant
- CO = College Accelerator Programme entrant
- NG = Next Gen Accelerator Program entrant
- w/o = Walkover
- r = Retired
- d = Defaulted

=== Draw ===
First round
1	(Poland) Ł Kubot (Brazil) M Melo	6	6
WC	(India) S Banthia (United States) M Thomson	2	4
(Uruguay) A Behar (Ecuador) G Escobar	6	6^{5}	[5]
(United Kingdom) K Skupski (United Kingdom) N Skupski	4	7^{7}	[10]
3	(South Africa) R Klaasen (Japan) B McLachlan	3	6	[4]
(New Zealand) M Daniell (Brazil) M Demoliner	6	4	[10]
(Croatia) I Dodig (United States) A Krajicek	7^{7}	6
WC	(United States) N Monroe (United States) J Withrow	6^{4}	4
(Kazakhstan) A Golubev (Germany) A Mies	2	7	[9]
(El Salvador) M Arévalo (Netherlands) M Middelkoop	6	5	[11]
(Australia) L Saville (Australia) J-P Smith	6	6
4	(Italy) S Bolelli (Argentina) M González	3	4
(Austria) O Marach (Austria) P Oswald	7^{7}	5	[10]
(Belgium) S Gillé (Belgium) J Vliegen	6^{4}	7	[4]
(Bosnia and Herzegovina) T Brkić (Serbia) N Ćaćić	4	1
2	(France) N Mahut (France) F Martin	6	6

Quarterfinals
1	(Poland) Ł Kubot (Brazil) M Melo	1	6	[10]
(United Kingdom) K Skupski (United Kingdom) N Skupski	6	2	[7]
(New Zealand) M Daniell (Brazil) M Demoliner	6^{8}	2
(Croatia) I Dodig (United States) A Krajicek	7^{10}	6
(El Salvador) M Arévalo (Netherlands) M Middelkoop	3	7^{8}	[10]
(Australia) L Saville (Australia) J-P Smith	6	6^{6}	[7]
(Austria) O Marach (Austria) P Oswald	w/o
2	(France) N Mahut (France) F Martin

Semifinals
1	(Poland) Ł Kubot (Brazil) M Melo	3	4
(Croatia) I Dodig (United States) A Krajicek	6	6
(El Salvador) M Arévalo (Netherlands) M Middelkoop	6	6
(Austria) O Marach (Austria) P Oswald	3	3

Final
(Croatia) I Dodig (United States) A Krajicek	7^{7}	5	[6]
(El Salvador) M Arévalo (Netherlands) M Middelkoop	6^{5}	7	[10]
