= 2021 Winston-Salem Open – Singles =

Singles
- 2021 Winston-Salem Open

Final
- Champion: (Belarus) Ilya Ivashka
- Runner-up: (Sweden) Mikael Ymer
- Score: 6–0, 6–2

Details
- Draw: 48 (4 Q / 4 WC )
- Seeds: 16

Events
Singles	Doubles
- Winston-Salem Open

Hubert Hurkacz was the reigning champion from when the tournament was last held in 2019, but chose not to participate this year.

Ilya Ivashka won his maiden ATP Tour title, defeating Mikael Ymer in the final, 6–0, 6–2. Ivashka became the first Belarusian man to win an ATP singles title since Max Mirnyi in 2003, while Ymer became the first Swedish man to reach an ATP singles final since Robin Söderling in 2011.

== Seeds ==
All seeds receive a bye into the second round.

1. (Spain) Pablo Carreño Busta (quarterfinals)
2. (Belgium) David Goffin (withdrew)
3. (United Kingdom) Dan Evans (third round)
4. (Hungary) Márton Fucsovics (third round)
5. (Kazakhstan) Alexander Bublik (second round)
6. (Croatia) Marin Čilić (second round)
7. (Georgia (country)) Nikoloz Basilashvili (withdrew)
8. (Australia) John Millman (withdrew)

9. (Germany) Jan-Lennard Struff (third round)
10. (Argentina) Federico Delbonis (second round)
11. (Spain) Albert Ramos Viñolas (second round)
12. (France) Benoît Paire (third round)
13. (United States) Frances Tiafoe (quarterfinals)
14. (France) Richard Gasquet (quarterfinals)
15. (Spain) Carlos Alcaraz (semifinals)
16. (Germany) Dominik Koepfer (third round)

Click on the seed number of a player to go to their draw section.

== Draw ==
Key

- Q = Qualifier
- WC = Wild card
- LL = Lucky loser
- Alt = Alternate
- ITF = ITF entry
- PR = Protected ranking
- SR = Special ranking
- SE = Special exempt
- JE = Junior exempt
- JR = Junior Accelerator Programme entrant
- CO = College Accelerator Programme entrant
- NG = Next Gen Accelerator Program entrant
- w/o = Walkover
- r = Retired
- d = Defaulted

=== Finals ===
Quarterfinals
1/WC	(Spain) Pablo Carreño Busta	6^{2}	3
(Belarus) Ilya Ivashka	7^{7}	6
14	(France) Richard Gasquet	6^{5}	1
(Finland) Emil Ruusuvuori	7^{7}	6
(United States) Marcos Giron	6^{2}	2
15	(Spain) Carlos Alcaraz	7^{7}	6
(Sweden) Mikael Ymer	6^{2}	6	6
13	(United States) Frances Tiafoe	7^{7}	2	3

Semifinals
(Belarus) Ilya Ivashka	6	6
(Finland) Emil Ruusuvuori	2	1
15	(Spain) Carlos Alcaraz	5	3
(Sweden) Mikael Ymer	7	6

Final
(Belarus) Ilya Ivashka	6	6
(Sweden) Mikael Ymer	0	2

=== Top half ===
==== Section 1 ====
First round
(Moldova) R Albot	2	5
(South Korea) S-w Kwon	6	7
(United States) T Sandgren	4	4
(Italy) M Cecchinato	6	6
Q	(Chinese Taipei) T-l Wu	6^{5}	3
(Italy) G Mager	7^{7}	6
(Italy) A Seppi	4	4
(Belarus) I Ivashka	6	6

Second round
1/WC	(Spain) P Carreño Busta	6	3	6
(South Korea) S-w Kwon	3	6	4
(Italy) M Cecchinato	7	4	4
16	(Germany) D Koepfer	5	6	6
9	(Germany) J-L Struff	6	6
(Italy) G Mager	2	2
(Belarus) I Ivashka	4	7	6
6	(Croatia) M Čilić	6	5	4

Third round
1/WC	(Spain) P Carreño Busta	6	6
16	(Germany) D Koepfer	2	3
9	(Germany) J-L Struff	2	1
(Belarus) I Ivashka	6	6

Quarterfinals
1/WC	(Spain) P Carreño Busta	6^{2}	3
(Belarus) I Ivashka	7^{7}	6

==== Section 2 ====
First round
Q	(France) L Pouille	6	6
(Spain) F López	1	4
(Belarus) E Gerasimov	7^{8}	3	6
(Slovakia) N Gombos	6^{6}	6	2
(France) A Rinderknech	5	3
PR	(France) G Simon	7	6
(Finland) E Ruusuvuori	6	6
Q	(United States) D Kudla	3	4

Second round
3/WC	(United Kingdom) D Evans	3	6	6
Q	(France) L Pouille	6	4	1
(Belarus) E Gerasimov	6^{4}	6^{6}
14	(France) R Gasquet	7^{7}	7^{8}
12	(France) B Paire	6	6
PR	(France) G Simon	3	3
(Finland) E Ruusuvuori	6	7^{7}
5	(Kazakhstan) A Bublik	2	6^{5}

Third round
3/WC	(United Kingdom) D Evans	4	6^{4}
14	(France) R Gasquet	6	7^{7}
12	(France) B Paire	4	6	1
(Finland) E Ruusuvuori	6	4	6

Quarterfinals
14	(France) R Gasquet	6^{5}	1
(Finland) E Ruusuvuori	7^{7}	6

=== Bottom half ===
==== Section 3 ====
First round
(Argentina) F Coria	6	4	6
(Italy) L Musetti	4	6	4
(United States) M Giron	7	6
(Argentina) F Bagnis	5	4
(United States) S Johnson	5	4
Q	(Australia) A Popyrin	7	6
(Spain) J Munar	6	3	0
LL	(Japan) Y Watanuki	3	6	6

Second round
LL	(France) P-H Herbert	6	6
(Argentina) F Coria	4	2
(United States) M Giron	6	6
10	(Argentina) F Delbonis	3	4
15	(Spain) C Alcaraz	6^{9}	6	7^{7}
Q	(Australia) A Popyrin	7^{11}	1	6^{1}
LL	(Japan) Y Watanuki	5	1
4	(Hungary) M Fucsovics	7	6

Third round
LL	(France) P-H Herbert	6	3	3
(United States) M Giron	4	6	6
15	(Spain) C Alcaraz	6	0	6
4	(Hungary) M Fucsovics	3	6	2

Quarterfinals
(United States) M Giron	6^{2}	2
15	(Spain) C Alcaraz	7^{7}	6

==== Section 4 ====
First round
(Australia) J Thompson	6	1	6
(Argentina) G Pella	1	6	3
(Sweden) M Ymer	6	1	6
(Italy) S Travaglia	2	6	2
LL	(United States) N Rubin	2	0
WC	(United Kingdom) A Murray	6	6
(Brazil) T Monteiro	6	4	7^{7}
(Australia) J Duckworth	4	6	6^{5}

Second round
LL	(Australia) M Purcell	7	6
(Australia) J Thompson	5	4
(Sweden) M Ymer	6	6
11	(Spain) A Ramos Viñolas	3	1
13	(United States) F Tiafoe	7^{7}	6
WC	(United Kingdom) A Murray	6^{4}	3
(Brazil) T Monteiro	7	6
LL	(United States) Ed Nava	5	1

Third round
LL	(Australia) M Purcell	5	2
(Sweden) M Ymer	7	6
13	(United States) F Tiafoe	7	7^{7}
(Brazil) T Monteiro	5	6^{2}

Quarterfinals
(Sweden) M Ymer	6^{2}	6	6
13	(United States) F Tiafoe	7^{7}	2	3

== Qualifying ==
=== Seeds ===
1. (Australia) Alexei Popyrin (qualified)
2. (United States) Denis Kudla (qualified)
3. (France) Pierre-Hugues Herbert (qualifying competition, lucky loser)
4. (France) Lucas Pouille (qualified)
5. (Australia) Max Purcell (qualifying competition, lucky loser)
6. (Japan) Yosuke Watanuki (qualifying competition, lucky loser)
7. (Chinese Taipei) Wu Tung-lin (qualified)
8. (United States) Noah Rubin (qualifying competition, lucky loser)

=== Qualifiers ===
1. (Australia) Alexei Popyrin
2. (United States) Denis Kudla
3. (Chinese Taipei) Wu Tung-lin
4. (France) Lucas Pouille

=== Lucky losers ===
1. (Japan) Yosuke Watanuki
2. (United States) Noah Rubin
3. (France) Pierre-Hugues Herbert
4. (Australia) Max Purcell
5. (United States) Eduardo Nava

=== Qualifying draw ===
==== First qualifier ====
First round
1	(Australia) Alexei Popyrin	6	7^{8}
(India) Mukund Sasikumar	1	6^{6}
Alt	(South Korea) Chung Yun-seong	3	6^{3}
6	(Japan) Yosuke Watanuki	6	7^{7}

Qualifying competition
1	(Australia) Alexei Popyrin	6	4	6
6	(Japan) Yosuke Watanuki	2	6	1

==== Second qualifier ====
First round
2	(United States) Denis Kudla	6	6
Alt	(United States) Sekou Bangoura	2	3
(Australia) John-Patrick Smith	6	1	4
5/Alt	(Australia) Max Purcell	3	6	6

Qualifying competition
2	(United States) Denis Kudla	6	5	6
5/Alt	(Australia) Max Purcell	4	7	2

==== Third qualifier ====
First round
3	(France) Pierre-Hugues Herbert	6^{4}	6	6
WC	(United States) Eduardo Nava	7^{7}	3	0
WC	(United States) Donald Young	0	0
7	(Chinese Taipei) Wu Tung-lin	6	6

Qualifying competition
3	(France) Pierre-Hugues Herbert	4	3
7	(Chinese Taipei) Wu Tung-lin	6	6

==== Fourth qualifier ====
First round
4	(France) Lucas Pouille	6^{6}	6	6
(Barbados) Darian King	7^{8}	4	4
(United States) JC Aragone	6^{3}	6	4
8	(United States) Noah Rubin	7^{7}	1	6

Qualifying competition
4	(France) Lucas Pouille	4	7^{7}	6
8	(United States) Noah Rubin	6	6^{5}	2
