= 2021 Winston-Salem Open =

- Date: August 21–28
- Edition: 52nd
- Category: ATP Tour 250 Series
- Draw: 48S / 16D
- Surface: Hard / outdoor
- Location: Winston-Salem, North Carolina, U.S.
- Venue: Wake Forest University

Champions

Singles
- (Belarus) Ilya Ivashka

Doubles
- (El Salvador) Marcelo Arévalo / (Netherlands) Matwé Middelkoop
- Winston-Salem Open

The 2021 Winston-Salem Open was a men's tennis tournament played on outdoor hard courts. It was the 52nd edition of the Winston-Salem Open (as successor to previous tournaments in New Haven and Long Island), and part of the ATP Tour 250 Series of the 2021 ATP Tour. It took place at Wake Forest University in Winston-Salem, North Carolina, United States, from August 21 through August 28, 2021. It was the last event on the 2021 US Open Series before the 2021 US Open.

== Champions ==
=== Singles ===
- (Belarus) Ilya Ivashka def. (Sweden) Mikael Ymer, 6–0, 6–2

=== Doubles ===
- (El Salvador) Marcelo Arévalo / (Netherlands) Matwé Middelkoop def. (Croatia) Ivan Dodig / (United States) Austin Krajicek, 6–7^{(5–7)}, 7–5, [10–6]

== Points and prize money ==
=== Point distribution ===
Event	W	F	SF	QF	Round of 16	Round of 32	Round of 48	Q	Q2	Q1
Singles	250	150	90	45	20	10	0	5	3	0
Doubles	250	150	90	45	0	—N/a	—N/a	—N/a	—N/a	—N/a

=== Prize money ===
Event	W	F	SF	QF	Round of 16	Round of 32	Round of 48	Q2	Q1
Singles	$96,505	$56,000	$32,350	$18,740	$10,740	$6,500	$3,950	$1,840	$920
Doubles*	$40,600	$20,800	$11,280	$6,450	$3,780	—N/a	—N/a	—N/a	—N/a

_{*per team}

== Singles main-draw entrants ==
=== Seeds ===
Country	Player	Rank^{1}	Seed
ESP	Pablo Carreño Busta	12	1
~~BEL~~	~~David Goffin~~	~~19~~	~~2~~
GBR	Dan Evans	28	3
HUN	Márton Fucsovics	37	4
KAZ	Alexander Bublik	38	5
CRO	Marin Čilić	39	6
~~GEO~~	~~Nikoloz Basilashvili~~	~~40~~	~~7~~
~~AUS~~	~~John Millman~~	~~44~~	~~8~~
GER	Jan-Lennard Struff	47	9
ARG	Federico Delbonis	48	10
ESP	Albert Ramos Viñolas	49	11
FRA	Benoît Paire	50	12
USA	Frances Tiafoe	51	13
FRA	Richard Gasquet	53	14
ESP	Carlos Alcaraz	55	15
GER	Dominik Koepfer	59	16

^{1} Rankings are as of August 16, 2021

=== Other entrants ===
The following players received wildcards into the singles main draw:

- (Spain) Pablo Carreño Busta
- ~~(Belgium) David Goffin~~
- (United Kingdom) Dan Evans
- (United Kingdom) Andy Murray

The following player received entry using a protected ranking into the singles main draw:

- (France) Gilles Simon

The following players received entry from the qualifying draw:

- (United States) Denis Kudla
- (Australia) Alexei Popyrin
- (France) Lucas Pouille
- (Chinese Taipei) Wu Tung-lin

The following players received entry as lucky losers:

- (France) Pierre-Hugues Herbert
- (United States) Eduardo Nava
- (Australia) Max Purcell
- (United States) Noah Rubin
- (Japan) Yosuke Watanuki

=== Withdrawals ===
Before the tournament

- (South Africa) Kevin Anderson → replaced by (France) Arthur Rinderknech
- (Spain) Pablo Andújar → replaced by (Italy) Marco Cecchinato
- (Georgia (country)) Nikoloz Basilashvili → replaced by (France) Pierre-Hugues Herbert
- (Slovenia) Aljaž Bedene → replaced by (United States) Tennys Sandgren
- (Serbia) Laslo Đere → replaced by (Sweden) Mikael Ymer
- (Belgium) David Goffin → replaced by (United States) Eduardo Nava
- (South Africa) Lloyd Harris → replaced by (Slovakia) Norbert Gombos
- (Australia) Nick Kyrgios → replaced by (United States) Noah Rubin
- (France) Adrian Mannarino → replaced by (Brazil) Thiago Monteiro
- (Australia) John Millman → replaced by (Australia) Max Purcell
- (Japan) Yoshihito Nishioka → replaced by (Argentina) Facundo Bagnis
- (Serbia) Miomir Kecmanović → replaced by (Moldova) Radu Albot
- (United States) Tommy Paul → replaced by (Italy) Andreas Seppi
- (Italy) Lorenzo Sonego → replaced by (Japan) Yosuke Watanuki

== Doubles main-draw entrants ==
=== Seeds ===
Country	Player	Country	Player	Rank^{1}	Seed
POL	Łukasz Kubot	BRA	Marcelo Melo	37	1
FRA	Nicolas Mahut	FRA	Fabrice Martin	40	2
RSA	Raven Klaasen	JPN	Ben McLachlan	52	3
ITA	Simone Bolelli	ARG	Máximo González	60	4

^{1} Rankings are as of August 16, 2021

=== Other entrants ===
The following pairs received wildcards into the doubles main draw:

- (India) Siddhant Banthia / (United States) Matthew Thomson
- (United States) Nicholas Monroe / (United States) Jackson Withrow

=== Withdrawals ===
Before the tournament

- (Croatia) Ivan Dodig / (United Kingdom) Jamie Murray → replaced by (Croatia) Ivan Dodig / (United States) Austin Krajicek
- (Spain) Marcel Granollers / (Argentina) Horacio Zeballos → replaced by (Austria) Oliver Marach / (Austria) Philipp Oswald
- (Netherlands) Wesley Koolhof / (Netherlands) Jean-Julien Rojer → replaced by (Uruguay) Ariel Behar / (Ecuador) Gonzalo Escobar
- (Germany) Kevin Krawietz / (Romania) Horia Tecău → replaced by (Bosnia and Herzegovina) Tomislav Brkić / (Serbia) Nikola Ćaćić
- (Australia) John Peers / (Slovakia) Filip Polášek → replaced by (New Zealand) Marcus Daniell / (Brazil) Marcelo Demoliner
- (Germany) Tim Pütz / (New Zealand) Michael Venus → replaced by (Australia) Luke Saville / (Australia) John-Patrick Smith
- (United States) Rajeev Ram / (United Kingdom) Joe Salisbury → replaced by (El Salvador) Marcelo Arévalo / (Netherlands) Matwé Middelkoop
