= 2024 Winston-Salem Open =

- Date: 18–24 August
- Edition: 55th
- Category: ATP Tour 250 Series
- Draw: 48S / 16D
- Surface: Hard / outdoor
- Location: Winston-Salem, North Carolina, United States
- Venue: Wake Forest University

Champions

Singles
- (Italy) Lorenzo Sonego

Doubles
- (United States) Nathaniel Lammons / (United States) Jackson Withrow
- Winston-Salem Open

The 2024 Winston-Salem Open was a men's tennis tournament played on outdoor hard courts. It was the 55th edition of the Winston-Salem Open (as successor to previous tournaments in New Haven and Long Island), and part of the ATP Tour 250 Series of the 2024 ATP Tour. It took place at Wake Forest University in Winston-Salem, North Carolina, United States, from August 18 to August 24, 2024.

== Champions ==
=== Singles ===
- (Italy) Lorenzo Sonego def. (United States) Alex Michelsen, 6–0, 6–3

=== Doubles ===
- (United States) Nathaniel Lammons / (United States) Jackson Withrow def. (United Kingdom) Julian Cash / (United States) Robert Galloway, 6–4, 6–3

== Singles main draw entrants ==
=== Seeds ===
Country	Player	Rank^{†}	Seed
ARG	Sebastián Báez	20	1
~~GBR~~	~~Jack Draper~~	~~28~~	~~2~~
ARG	Francisco Cerúndolo	29	3
FRA	Adrian Mannarino	33	4
ITA	Luciano Darderi	34	5
ARG	Tomás Martín Etcheverry	37	6
ARG	Mariano Navone	38	7
POR	Nuno Borges	39	8
HUN	Fábián Marozsán	50	9
ITA	Lorenzo Sonego	56	10
USA	Alex Michelsen	57	11
FRA	Arthur Rinderknech	59	12
KAZ	Alexander Shevchenko	60	13
FRA	Hugo Gaston	61	14
	Pavel Kotov	63	15
AUS	Rinky Hijikata	65	16
	Roman Safiullin	66	17

^{†} Rankings are as of 12 August 2024.

=== Other entrants ===
The following players received wildcards into the singles main draw:

- (Spain) Pablo Carreño Busta
- (United States) Christopher Eubanks
- (United States) Reilly Opelka

The following player received entry using a protected ranking:

- (Switzerland) Dominic Stricker

The following player received entry as an alternate:

- (France) Alexandre Müller

The following players received entry from the qualifying draw:

- (United States) Strong Kirchheimer
- (United States) Omni Kumar
- (Australia) Tristan Schoolkate
- (United States) Learner Tien

The following players received entry as lucky losers:

- (Colombia) Nicolás Mejía
- (United States) Zachary Svajda

=== Withdrawals ===
- (Spain) Roberto Bautista Agut → replaced by (India) Sumit Nagal
- (Italy) Matteo Berrettini → replaced by (France) Hugo Gaston
- (Italy) Flavio Cobolli → replaced by (Australia) Christopher O'Connell
- (Spain) Alejandro Davidovich Fokina → replaced by (China) Shang Juncheng
- (United Kingdom) Jack Draper → replaced by (United States) Zachary Svajda
- (France) Arthur Fils → replaced by (Australia) Adam Walton
- (Italy) Fabio Fognini → replaced by (Hungary) Márton Fucsovics
- (United States) Marcos Giron → replaced by (Netherlands) Botic van de Zandschulp
- (Germany) Dominik Koepfer → replaced by (Croatia) Borna Ćorić
- (Spain) Pedro Martínez → replaced by (Australia) Rinky Hijikata
- (United States) Mackenzie McDonald → replaced by (Colombia) Nicolás Mejía
- (France) Giovanni Mpetshi Perricard → replaced by (Japan) Taro Daniel
- (United States) Brandon Nakashima → replaced by (France) Constant Lestienne
- (Austria) Sebastian Ofner → replaced by (Australia) James Duckworth
- (Australia) Max Purcell → replaced by (Switzerland) Dominic Stricker
- (Finland) Emil Ruusuvuori → replaced by (France) Alexandre Müller

== Doubles main draw entrants ==
=== Seeds ===
Country	Player	Country	Player	Rank^{†}	Seed
GBR	Neal Skupski	NZL	Michael Venus	36	1
NED	Wesley Koolhof	CRO	Nikola Mektić	43	2
USA	Austin Krajicek	NED	Jean-Julien Rojer	53	3
USA	Nathaniel Lammons	USA	Jackson Withrow	56	4
CRO	Ivan Dodig	CZE	Adam Pavlásek	62	5
URU	Ariel Behar	ARG	Andrés Molteni	63	6
BRA	Rafael Matos	BRA	Marcelo Melo	71	7
FRA	Sadio Doumbia	GBR	Lloyd Glasspool	74	8

^{†} Rankings are as of 12 August 2024.

=== Other entrants ===
The following pairs received wildcard entry into the doubles main draw :

- (Colombia) Nicolás Barrientos / (Tunisia) Skander Mansouri
- (United Kingdom) Luca Pow / (India) Dhakshineswar Suresh

The following pair received entry as alternates:

- (Ecuador) Gonzalo Escobar / (Kazakhstan) Aleksandr Nedovyesov

=== Withdrawals ===
- (El Salvador) Marcelo Arévalo / (Croatia) Mate Pavić → replaced by (Germany) Constantin Frantzen / (Germany) Hendrik Jebens
- (Finland) Harri Heliövaara / (United Kingdom) Henry Patten → replaced by (United Kingdom) Jamie Murray / (Australia) John Peers
- (Australia) Rinky Hijikata / (Australia) Max Purcell → replaced by (Ecuador) Gonzalo Escobar / (Kazakhstan) Aleksandr Nedovyesov
- (Germany) Kevin Krawietz / (Germany) Tim Pütz → replaced by (Austria) Alexander Erler / (Netherlands) Robin Haase
- (United States) Rajeev Ram / (United Kingdom) Joe Salisbury → replaced by (United Kingdom) Julian Cash / (United States) Robert Galloway
