= Luca Pow =

British tennis player (born 2005)

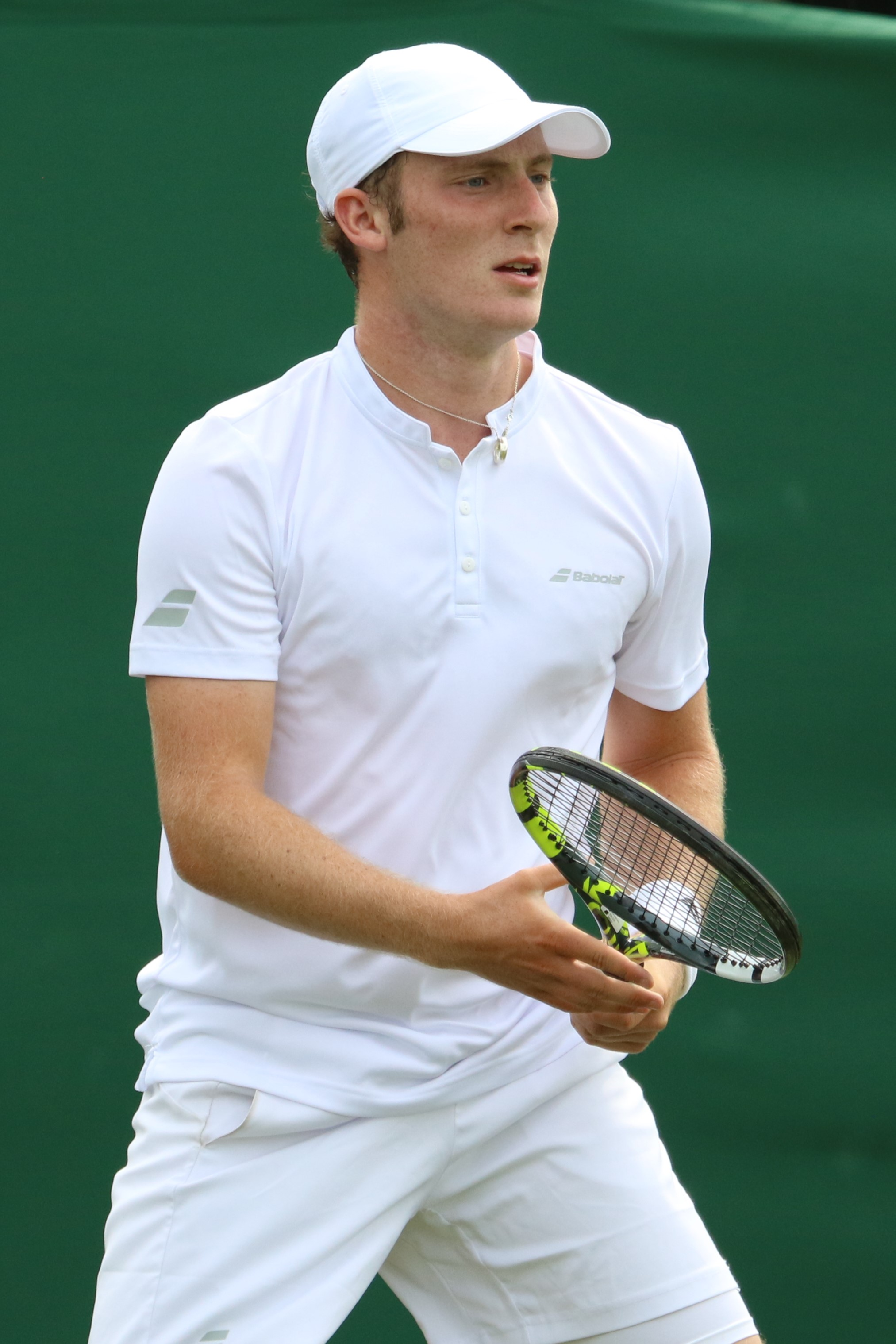
- Pow in 2023 Wimbledon Qualification
- Country (sports): United Kingdom
- Born: 1 February 2005 (age 21) Solihull, England
- Height: 1.75 m (5 ft 9 in)
- Plays: Left-handed (two-handed backhand)
- Prize money: US $60,635

Singles
- Career record: 0–0 (at ATP Tour level, Grand Slam level, and in Davis Cup)
- Highest ranking: No. 838 (13 October 2025)
- Current ranking: No. 1,094 (9 November 2026)

Grand Slam singles results
- Wimbledon: Q1 (2022, 2023)

Doubles
- Career record: 2–2 (at ATP Tour level, Grand Slam level, and in Davis Cup)
- Highest ranking: No. 443 (4 August 2025)
- Current ranking: No. 1,368 (9 November 2026)
- Last updated on: 9 November 2026.

Luca Pow (born 1 February 2005) is a British tennis player. He has a career high singles ranking of world No. 838 achieved on 13 October 2025 and a career high doubles ranking of world No. 443 achieved on 4 August 2025.

== College ==
Pow is attending Wake Forest University since 2023 studying for a Business degree. He reached the final of the 2026 NCAA Championships, where he faced teammate Dominick Mosejczuk.

== Professional career ==
In April 2022 Pow won the British national junior tennis title to ensure a wildcard into the 2022 Wimbledon Championship qualifying draw. In the qualifying he lost in the first round to the 26th seed, American Mitchell Krueger.

In 2023 he successfully defended his national U18 title. In the qualifying for the 2023 Wimbledon Championship he lost in the first round to Dutchman Gijs Brouwer.

He made his main draw ATP debut in doubles at the 2024 Winston-Salem Open playing alongside Dhakshineswar Suresh. In the first round the pair defeated sixth seeds Andrés Molteni and Ariel Behar. The pair also returned for the 2025 edition as wildcards.
