= Eduardo Nava (tennis) =

American tennis player

- Country (sports): United States
- Born: March 11, 1997 (age 29) Northridge, United States
- Height: 1.80 m (5 ft 11 in)
- Plays: Right-handed (two-handed backhand)
- College: TCU; Wake Forest
- Coach: Xóchitl Escobedo, Tony Bresky
- Prize money: US $18,279

Singles
- Career record: 0–1 (at ATP Tour level, Grand Slam level, and in Davis Cup)
- Career titles: 0
- Highest ranking: No. 792 (August 15, 2022)

Doubles
- Career record: 0–0 (at ATP Tour level, Grand Slam level, and in Davis Cup)
- Career titles: 0
- Highest ranking: No. 670 (July 3, 2023)

Eduardo Nava (born March 11, 1997) is an American tennis player. Nava has a career high ATP singles ranking of No. 792 achieved on August 15, 2022 and a career high ATP doubles ranking of No. 670 achieved on July 3, 2023.

Nava made his ATP main draw debut at the 2021 Winston-Salem Open after entering the singles main draw as a lucky loser. He lost to Thiago Monteiro 5–7, 1–6.

Nava played college tennis at TCU and Wake Forest University.

Nava comes from a family of athletes. He is the son of sprinter Eduardo Nava and tennis player Xóchitl Escobedo. His brother, Emilio Nava, and cousin, Ernesto Escobedo are both professional tennis players.

== ITF World Tennis Tour finals ==
=== Singles: 1 (1 runner-up) ===
Legend ITF WTT (0–1)

Result	W–L	Date	Tournament	Tier	Surface	Opponent	Score
Loss	0–1	Mar 2021	M25 Austin, USA	WTT	Hard	(United States) Zachary Svajda	4–6, 6–4, 4–6

=== Doubles: 6 (4 titles, 2 runner-ups) ===
Legend ITF WTT (4–2)

Result	W–L	Date	Tournament	Tier	Surface	Partner	Opponents	Score
Win	1–1	Sep 2020	M15 Sintra, Portugal	WTT	Hard	(United States) Emilio Nava	(Germany) Sebastian Fanselow (Germany) Maik Steiner	6–3, 6–4
Loss	1–1	Sep 2020	M15 Castelo Branco, Portugal	WTT	Hard	(United States) Emilio Nava	(Brazil) Mateus Alves (Brazil) Igor Marcondes	6–7^{(4–7)}, 7–5, [8–10]
Loss	1–2	Oct 2021	M15 Ithaca, USA	WTT	Hard	(United States) Nathan Ponwith	(United Kingdom) Henry Patten (United Kingdom) Charles Broom	6–7^{(6–8)}, 3–6
Win	2–2	Jul 2022	M15 Lakewood, USA	WTT	Hard	(United States) Nathan Ponwith	(United States) Bjorn Swenson (United States) Bryce Nakashima	6–3, 2–6, [10–4]
Win	3–2	Nov 2022	M25 Columbus, USA	WTT	Hard (i)	(United States) John McNally	(Australia) Joshua Charlton (United States) Quinn Vandecasteele	6–4, 6–4
Win	4–2	Jun 2023	M15 Los Angeles, USA	WTT	Hard	(United States) Nathan Ponwith	(Italy) Lorenzo Claverie (United States) Nicholas Godsick	6–4, 6–3
