= Strong Kirchheimer =

American tennis player (born 1995)

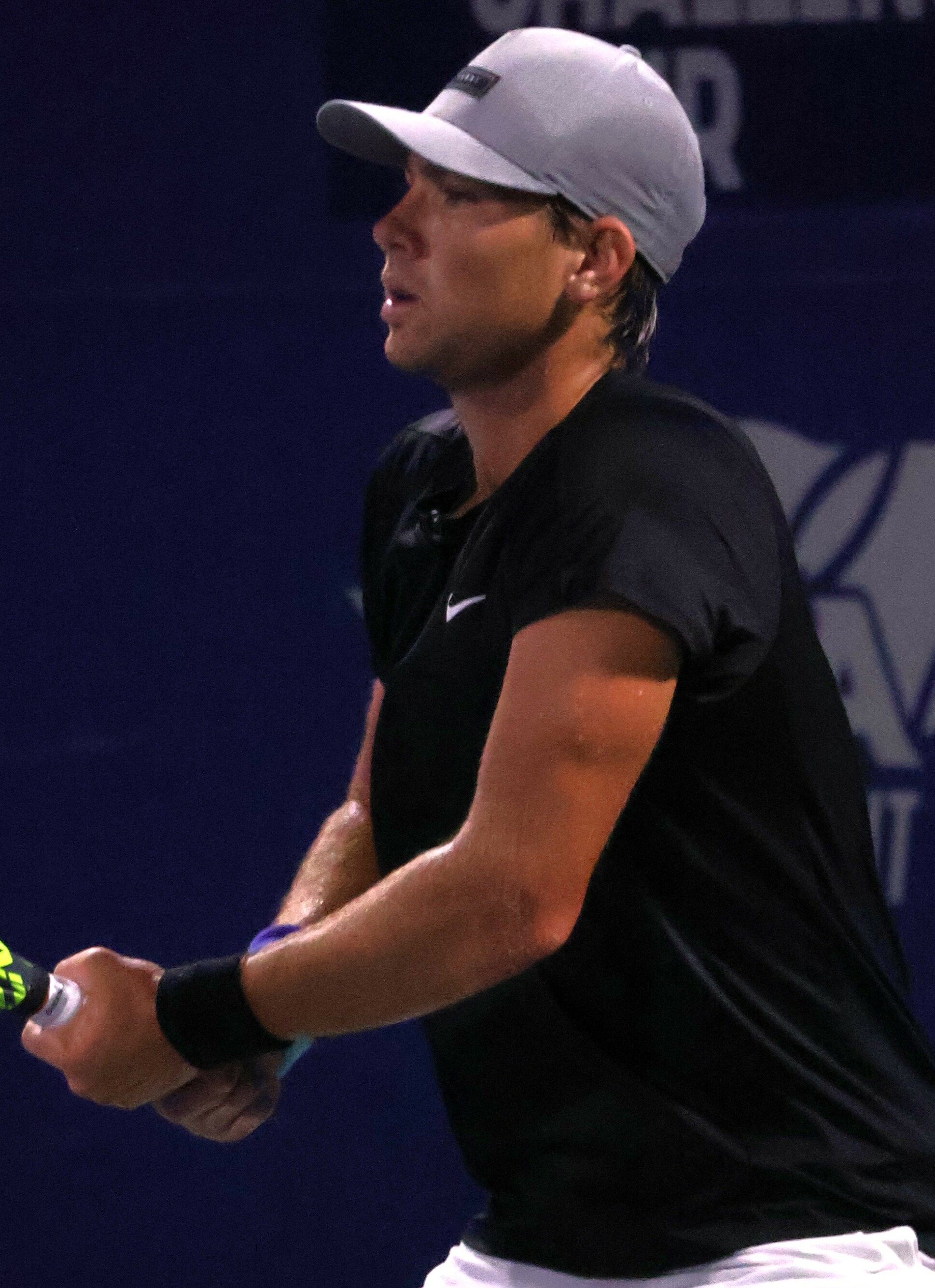
- Kirchheimer at the 2023 Cary Challenger II
- Country (sports): United States
- Born: 26 April 1995 (age 31) Highland Park, Illinois, United States
- Height: 6 ft 1 in (1.85 m)
- Plays: Right-handed (two-handed backhand)
- College: Northwestern
- Coach: Robert Kirchheimer, Arvid Swan
- Prize money: US $153,845

Singles
- Career record: 0–2 (at ATP Tour level, Grand Slam level, and in Davis Cup)
- Career titles: 0
- Highest ranking: No. 375 (November 6, 2023)
- Current ranking: No. 690 (August 31, 2026)

Doubles
- Career record: 0–0 (at ATP Tour level, Grand Slam level, and in Davis Cup)
- Career titles: 0
- Highest ranking: No. 491 (September 20, 2021)
- Current ranking: No. 1,210 (August 31, 2026)
- Last updated on: September 1, 2026.

Strong Kirchheimer (born 26 April 1995) is an American tennis player. Kirchheimer has a career high ATP singles ranking of world No. 375 achieved on November 6, 2023 and a career high ATP doubles ranking of No. 491 achieved on September 20, 2021.

== Professional career ==
Kirchheimer made his ATP main draw debut at the 2023 Winston-Salem Open after entering the singles main draw as a lucky loser directly into the second round after the withdrawal of 11th seed Daniel Altmaier.

For a second year in a row, ranked No. 495, he entered the main draw of the 2024 Winston-Salem Open after qualifying as an alternate, with wins over another alternate player Ryan Fishback and sixth qualifying seed Thai-Son Kwiatkowski.

== College career ==
Kirchheimer played college tennis at Northwestern University.

== Challenger and World Tennis Tour finals ==
=== Singles: 10 (1–9) ===
Legend (singles) ATP Challenger Tour (0–0) ITF World Tennis Tour (1–9)	Finals by surface Hard (1–6) Clay (0–3) Grass (0–0) Carpet (0–0)

Result	W–L	Date	Tournament	Tier	Surface	Opponent	Score
Loss	0–1	Mar 2018	Canada F1, Gatineau	Futures	Hard	(France) Ugo Humbert	4–6, 0–6
Loss	0–2	Nov 2018	USA F29, Birmingham	Futures	Clay	(Venezuela) Ricardo Rodríguez-Pace	6–7^{(6–8)}, 4–6
Loss	0–3	Nov 2018	USA F30, Niceville	Futures	Clay	(Colombia) Nicolás Mejía	4–6, 4–6
Loss	0–4	Jun 2019	M15 Champaign, USA	World Tennis Tour	Hard	(United States) Nathan Ponwith	6–7^{(2–7)}, 4–6
Loss	0–5	Jun 2019	M15 Rochester, USA	World Tennis Tour	Clay	(Ecuador) Diego Hidalgo	6–7^{(8–10)}, 6–7^{(2–7)}
Win	1–5	Feb 2020	M15 Cancún, Mexico	World Tennis Tour	Hard	(United States) Dusty Boyer	6–4, 6–4
Loss	1–6	Sep 2020	M15 Castelo Branco, Portugal	World Tennis Tour	Hard	(Monaco) Lucas Catarina	3–6, 6–2, 6–7^{(11–13)}
Loss	1–7	Jul 2021	M15 Edwardsville, USA	World Tennis Tour	Hard	(Australia) Rinky Hijikata	3–6, 1–6
Loss	1–8	Mar 2023	M25 Montreal, Canada	World Tennis Tour	Hard	(France) Jules Marie	5–7, 0–6
Loss	1–9	Jun 2023	M15 South Bend, USA	World Tennis Tour	Hard	(United States) James Tracy	1–6, 2–6

=== Doubles: 5 (4–1) ===
Legend (doubles) ATP Challenger Tour (0–0) ITF World Tennis Tour (4–1)	Finals by surface Hard (3–1) Clay (1–0) Grass (0–0) Carpet (0–0)

Result	W–L	Date	Tournament	Tier	Surface	Partner	Opponents	Score
Win	1–0	Jan 2019	M15 Naples, USA	World Tennis Tour	Clay	(Republic of Ireland) Julian Bradley	(Chile) Gonzalo Lama (Chile) Alejandro Tabilo	6–4, 6–2
Loss	1–1	Feb 2019	M15 Tucson, USA	World Tennis Tour	Hard	(Republic of Ireland) Julian Bradley	(United States) Martin Redlicki (Brazil) Karue Sell	4–6, 1–6
Win	2–1	Dec 2019	M15 Tallahassee, USA	World Tennis Tour	Hard	(United States) Dennis Novikov	(United Kingdom) Jack Findel-Hawkins (United Kingdom) Ryan Peniston	7–5, 6–3
Win	3–1	Sep 2020	M25+H Plaisir, France	World Tennis Tour	Hard	(Belgium) Michael Geerts	(Brazil) Guilherme Clezar (Brazil) Pedro Sakamoto	6–2, 6–7^{(4–7)}, [10–4]
Win	4–1	Jun 2021	M25 Tulsa, USA	World Tennis Tour	Hard	(Greece) Michail Pervolarakis	(United States) JC Aragone (Colombia) Nicolás Barrientos	6–1, 4–6, [10–7]
