= Omni Kumar =

American tennis player

- Full name: Omni Le Kumar
- Country (sports): United States
- Born: 10 October 2001 (age 24) Mountain View, CA, United States
- Height: 5 ft 8 in (1.73 m)
- Turned pro: 2020
- Retired: December 2025
- Plays: Left-handed (one-handed backhand)
- College: Duke
- Coach: Brandon Lam
- Prize money: US $104,873

Singles
- Career record: 2–3 (at ATP Tour level, Grand Slam level, and in Davis Cup)
- Career titles: 0
- Highest ranking: No. 348 (March 18, 2024)

Doubles
- Career record: 0–0 (at ATP Tour level, Grand Slam level, and in Davis Cup)
- Career titles: 0
- Highest ranking: No. 1,134 (February 27, 2023)

Omni Kumar (born 10 October 2001) is a former American tennis player. He has a career high ATP singles ranking of world No. 348 achieved on March 18, 2024 and a doubles ranking of No. 1,134 achieved on February 27, 2023.

== Professional career ==
Kumar made his ATP main draw debut at the 2023 Los Cabos Open after defeating Renzo Olivo and Jason Jung to qualify for the singles main draw.

He won his first ATP match a few months later as a lucky loser in Winston-Salem against top 100 player Arthur Rinderknech. He then upset eight seed Botic van de Zandschulp to reach the Round of 16 before losing to Juan Manuel Cerúndolo.

In back to back appearances, ranked No. 429, he entered the main draw of the 2024 Winston-Salem Open after qualifying, with straight-sets wins over eight qualifying seed Ryan Seggerman and second qualifying seed Zachary Svajda.

== College career ==
Kumar played college tennis at Duke University for his freshman year.

== Challenger and Futures/World Tennis Tour Finals ==
=== Singles: 15 (8–7) ===
Legend (singles) ATP Challenger Tour (0–0) ITF Futures/World Tennis Tour (8–7)	Titles by surface Hard (8–7) Clay (0–0) Grass (0–0) Carpet (0–0)

Result	W–L	Date	Tournament	Tier	Surface	Opponent	Score
Win	1–0	Jul 2021	M15 Monastir, Tunisia	World Tennis Tour	Hard	(Italy) Luciano Darderi	7–6^{(8–6)}, 6–3
Loss	1–1	Jul 2021	M15 Monastir, Tunisia	World Tennis Tour	Hard	(Monaco) Valentin Vacherot	4–6, 4–6
Win	2–1	Dec 2021	M15 Monastir, Tunisia	World Tennis Tour	Hard	(Colombia) Adrià Soriano Barrera	7–5, 6–4
Loss	2–2	Dec 2021	M15 Monastir, Tunisia	World Tennis Tour	Hard	(France) Martin Breysach	4–6, 6–4, 6–7^{(5–7)}
Loss	2–3	Apr 2022	M15 Monastir, Tunisia	World Tennis Tour	Hard	(Italy) Mattia Bellucci	1–6, 4–6
Loss	2–4	Nov 2022	M25 Monastir, Tunisia	World Tennis Tour	Hard	(Tunisia) Skander Mansouri	3–6, 4–6
Loss	2–5	Dec 2022	M15 Monastir, Tunisia	World Tennis Tour	Hard	(Croatia) Dino Prižmić	3–6, 5–7
Win	3–5	Dec 2022	M15 Monastir, Tunisia	World Tennis Tour	Hard	(France) Robin Bertrand	6–1, 6–2
Win	4–5	Apr 2023	M15 Monastir, Tunisia	World Tennis Tour	Hard	Bogdan Bobrov	7–6^{(7–4)}, 2–6, 6–1
Loss	4–6	May 2023	M15 Monastir, Tunisia	World Tennis Tour	Hard	(Tunisia) Skander Mansouri	3–6, 4–6
Win	5–6	Jun 2023	M15 Los Angeles, USA	World Tennis Tour	Hard	(United States) Quinn Vandecasteele	6–4, 6–1
Win	6–6	Dec 2023	M15 Monastir, Tunisia	World Tennis Tour	Hard	(Germany) Christoph Negritu	6–1, 6–1
Win	7–6	Dec 2023	M15 Monastir, Tunisia	World Tennis Tour	Hard	(Moldova) Alexandr Cozbinov	6–4, 7–5
Win	8–6	Sep 2024	M15 Monastir, Tunisia	World Tennis Tour	Hard	(France) Louis Dussin	6–3, 6–7^{(4-7)}, 6–1
Loss	8-7	Oct 2024	M15 Monastir, Tunisia	World Tennis Tour	Hard	(Belgium) Kimmer Coppejans	3–6, 2–6
