= Southern California Open Challenger =

Southern California Open

ATP Challenger Tour
- Event name: Southern California Open
- Location: Indian Wells, California, United States
- Category: ATP Challenger Tour
- Surface: Hard
- Website: Website

The Southern California Open was a professional tennis tournament played on hard courts. It was part of the ATP Challenger Tour and was held in Indian Wells, California, United States in 2024.

== Past finals ==
=== Singles ===
Year	Champion	Runner-up	Score
2024 (2)	(Jamaica) Blaise Bicknell	(United States) Zachary Svajda	6–3, 6–2
2024 (1)	(United States) Mitchell Krueger	(United States) Brandon Holt	4–6, 6–3, 6–4

=== Doubles ===
Year	Champions	Runners-up	Score
2024 (2)	(United States) Ryan Seggerman (United States) Patrik Trhac	(Australia) Thomas Fancutt (New Zealand) Ajeet Rai	6–4, 3–6, [10–3]
2024 (1)	(United States) Ryan Seggerman (United States) Patrik Trhac	(United States) Thai-Son Kwiatkowski (United States) Alex Lawson	6–2, 7–6^{(7–3)}
