= Tim Handel =

German tennis player (born 1996)

- Country (sports): Germany
- Residence: Reutlingen, Germany
- Born: 18 October 1996 (age 29) Reutlingen
- Height: 1.88 m (6 ft 2 in)
- Turned pro: 2019
- Plays: Left-handed (two-handed backhand)
- College: Northern Arizona University
- Coach: Marek Kimla, Bastian Suwanprateep
- Prize money: US $107,405

Singles
- Career record: 0–0
- Career titles: 2 ITF
- Highest ranking: No. 362 (20 May 2024)
- Current ranking: No. 668 (14 September 2026)

Doubles
- Career record: 0–0
- Career titles: 4 ITF
- Highest ranking: No. 414 (25 August 2025)
- Current ranking: No. 1,160 (14 September 2026)
- Last updated on: 16 September 2026.

Tim Handel (born 18 October 1996) is a German tennis player. He has a career high ATP singles ranking of world No. 362 achieved on 20 May 2024 and has a career-high doubles ranking of No. 414 achieved on 25 August 2025.

Handel won his first ITF title at the Luxoil Open in Trier in August 2021.

== Collegiate career ==
Handel played four years at the Northern Arizona University in Flagstaff, Arizona. He won three Big Sky Conference MVP Honors and qualified for the NCAA singles tournament in his last year. He became just the fourth men's tennis player in Big Sky history to win three MVP awards since it was first given out in 1983.

Handel was the first Big Sky player to play in the NCAA Singles tournament since 2006 and just the 11th Big Sky conference player ever dating back to 1980.

== ITF World Tennis Tour finals ==
=== Singles: 7 (2 titles, 5 runner-ups) ===
| Result | W–L | Date | Tournament | Surface | Opponent | Score |
|---|---|---|---|---|---|---|
| Win | 1–0 | Aug 2021 | M25 Trier, Germany | Clay | (Germany) Louis Wessels | 6–2, 6–4 |
| Loss | 1–1 | May 2023 | M15 Warmbad Villach, Austria | Clay | (Argentina) Alex Barrena | 6–2, 4–6, 3–6 |
| Loss | 1–2 | Jun 2023 | M25 Jablonec nad Nisou, Czech Republic | Clay | (Austria) Lukas Neumayer | 2–6, 6–3, 1–6 |
| Loss | 1–3 | Aug 2023 | M25 Lesa, Italy | Clay | (France) Clement Tabur | 6–3, 4–6, 1–6 |
| Win | 2–3 | Nov 2023 | M25 Antalya, Turkey | Clay | (Italy) Alexander Weis | 6–3, 1–6, 6–3 |
| Loss | 2–4 | Aug 2024 | M25 Lesa, Italy | Clay | (Italy) Andrea Picchione | 6–7^{(2–7)}, 6–7^{(3–7)} |
| Loss | 2–5 | Nov 2025 | M25 Antalya, Turkey | Clay | (Bosnia and Herzegovina) Andrej Nedić | 6–4, 0–6, 2–6 |

=== Doubles: 12 (5 titles, 7 runner-ups) ===
| Result | W–L | Date | Tournament | Surface | Partner | Opponents | Score |
|---|---|---|---|---|---|---|---|
| Loss | 0–1 | Jul 2021 | M25 Marburg, Germany | Clay | (Switzerland) Yannik Steinegger | (Netherlands) Daniel de Jonge (Netherlands) Guy den Ouden | 6–2, 4–6, [9–11] |
| Loss | 0–2 | Aug 2021 | M25 Ueberlingen, Germany | Clay | (Germany) Fabian Fallert | (Germany) Hendrik Jebens (Germany) Niklas Schell | 4–6, 5–7 |
| Win | 1–2 | Dec 2021 | M15 Cancún, Mexico | Hard | (Switzerland) Yannik Steinegger | (Canada) Liam Draxl (Canada) Cleeve Harper | 7–6^{(7–5)}, 6–3 |
| Loss | 1–3 | Mar 2022 | M25 Trento, Italy | Hard (i) | (Switzerland) Yannik Steinegger | (France) Dan Added (Czech Republic) Andrew Paulson | 4–6, 6–3, [8–10] |
| Loss | 1–4 | Aug 2022 | M25 Ueberlingen, Germany | Clay | (Germany) Peter Heller | (Czech Republic) Adam Jurajda (Czech Republic) Daniel Siniakov | 4–6, 5–7 |
| Loss | 1–5 | Oct 2022 | M15 Antalya, Turkey | Clay | (Germany) Peter Heller | Igor Kudriashov (United Kingdom) Maxim Shin | w/o |
| Loss | 1–6 | Dec 2022 | M15 Madrid, Spain | Hard | (Switzerland) Yannik Steinegger | (Finland) Eero Vasa (United Kingdom) Mark Whitehouse | 6–7^{(6–8)}, 3–6 |
| Win | 2–6 | Feb 2023 | M15 Monastir, Tunisia | Hard | (Switzerland) Yannik Steinegger | (Japan) Ryuki Matsuda (Japan) Naoki Tajima | 6–4, 6–1 |
| Win | 3–6 | Mar 2024 | M25 Saint-Dizier, Tunisia | Hard (i) | (Switzerland) Yannik Steinegger | (Germany) Daniel Masur; Alexey Vatutin | 6–2, 6–3 |
| Loss | 3–7 | Nov 2024 | M15 Antalya, Turkey | Clay | (Serbia) Stefan Popovic | (Romania) Gabi Adrian Boitan (Romania) Alexandru Cristian Dumitru | 6–0, 5–7, [7–10] |
| Win | 4–7 | Nov 2024 | M15 Antalya, Turkey | Clay | (Serbia) Stefan Popovic | (Bulgaria) Yanaki Milev (Bulgaria) Petr Nesterov | 6–3, 6–2 |
| Win | 5–7 | May 2025 | M25 Vic, Spain | Clay | (Germany) Lucas Gerch | (Spain) Imanol López Morillo (United States) Richard Zusman | 7–5, 6–3 |
