= Matthew Thomson (tennis) =

American tennis player

- Country (sports): United States
- Residence: Winston-Salem, United States
- Born: May 28, 2000 (age 26) Durham, North Carolina, US
- Height: 6 ft 3 in (1.91 m)
- Plays: Right-handed (two-handed backhand)
- College: Wake Forest
- Prize money: US $20,251

Singles
- Career record: 0–0 (at ATP Tour level, Grand Slam level, and in Davis Cup)
- Career titles: 0
- Highest ranking: No. 970 (September 28, 2026)
- Current ranking: No. 978 (November 9, 2026)

Doubles
- Career record: 0–3 (at ATP Tour level, Grand Slam level, and in Davis Cup)
- Career titles: 0
- Highest ranking: No. 872 (November 17, 2025)
- Current ranking: No. 1,310 (November 9, 2026)
- Last updated on: November 9, 2026.

Matthew Thomson (born May 28, 2000) is an American tennis player. He has a career high singles ranking of No. 970 achieved on September 28, 2026 and a doubles ranking of No. 872 achieved on November 17, 2025.

Thomson made his ATP main draw debut at the 2021 Winston-Salem Open after receiving a wildcard into the doubles main draw.

Thomson plays college tennis at Wake Forest University.
