= Thai-Son Kwiatkowski =

American tennis player (1995-)

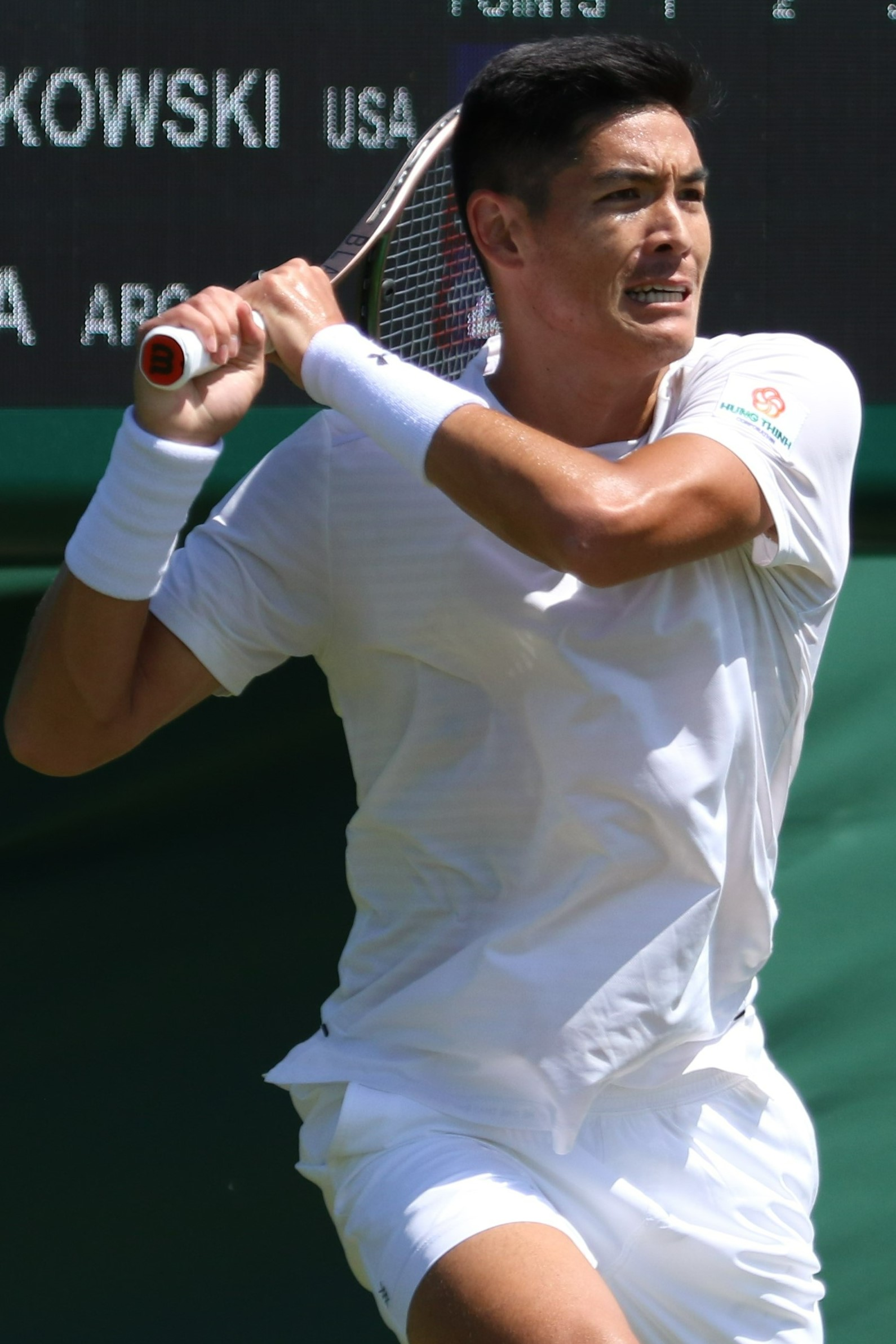
- Kwiatkowski at the 2022 Wimbledon Championships
- Country (sports): United States
- Residence: Charlottesville, Virginia
- Born: February 13, 1995 (age 31) Charlotte, North Carolina
- Height: 6 ft 2 in (1.88 m)
- Turned pro: 2017
- Retired: N/A
- Plays: Right-handed (two-handed backhand)
- College: University of Virginia
- Prize money: $ 538,880

Singles
- Career record: 0–7 (Grand Slam, ATP Tour level, and Davis Cup)
- Career titles: 0
- Highest ranking: No. 181 (February 3, 2020)

Grand Slam singles results
- Australian Open: Q1 (2020, 2021)
- French Open: Q2 (2021)
- Wimbledon: Q1 (2021, 2022)
- US Open: 1R (2017, 2020)

Doubles
- Career record: 0–3
- Career titles: 0
- Highest ranking: No. 232 (July 29, 2019)

Grand Slam doubles results
- US Open: 1R (2019)

Grand Slam mixed doubles results
- US Open: 2R (2024)
- Last updated on: 1 September 2025.

Thai-Son Kwiatkowski (born February 13, 1995) is a Vietnamese American tennis player. He played collegiately for the Virginia Cavaliers. On 29 May 2017, Kwiatkowski won the NCAA Men's Singles Championship.

== College career ==
Coming out of high school, he was the nation's top recruit. Kwiatkowski was on three national championship teams during his time at Virginia. As a sophomore, he tied the school's single season wins record, going 44-8 during the season. On September 11, 2016, Kwiatkowski won the American Collegiate Invitational, which earned him a wild card into the qualifying tournament for the 2017 US Open. After his senior season, he was named first-team all-ACC. Kwiatkowski won the singles title at the 2017 NCAA Men's Singles Championship, defeating William Blumberg in the final.

Other notable college achievements:

- 2018 NCAA Top 10 Award winner
- ACC Men's Tennis Scholar-Athlete of the Year (second straight year)
- Was also named the Virginia Athletic Department's Scholar Athlete of the Year for the second straight year
- Singles All-American, his third time earning the honor
- All-ACC First Team, his fourth all-conference honor but his first time being voted to the first team
- ITA Atlantic Region Senior Player of the Year
- NCAA All-Tournament Team at No. 2 Doubles
- ITA Indoors All-Tournament Team (No. 2 Singles and No. 2 Doubles)
- ITA Scholar-Athlete
- Repeated as the VaSID State Player of the Year
- Four-time member of the All-ACC Academic Team
- ACC Player of the Week (April 18)

== Professional career ==
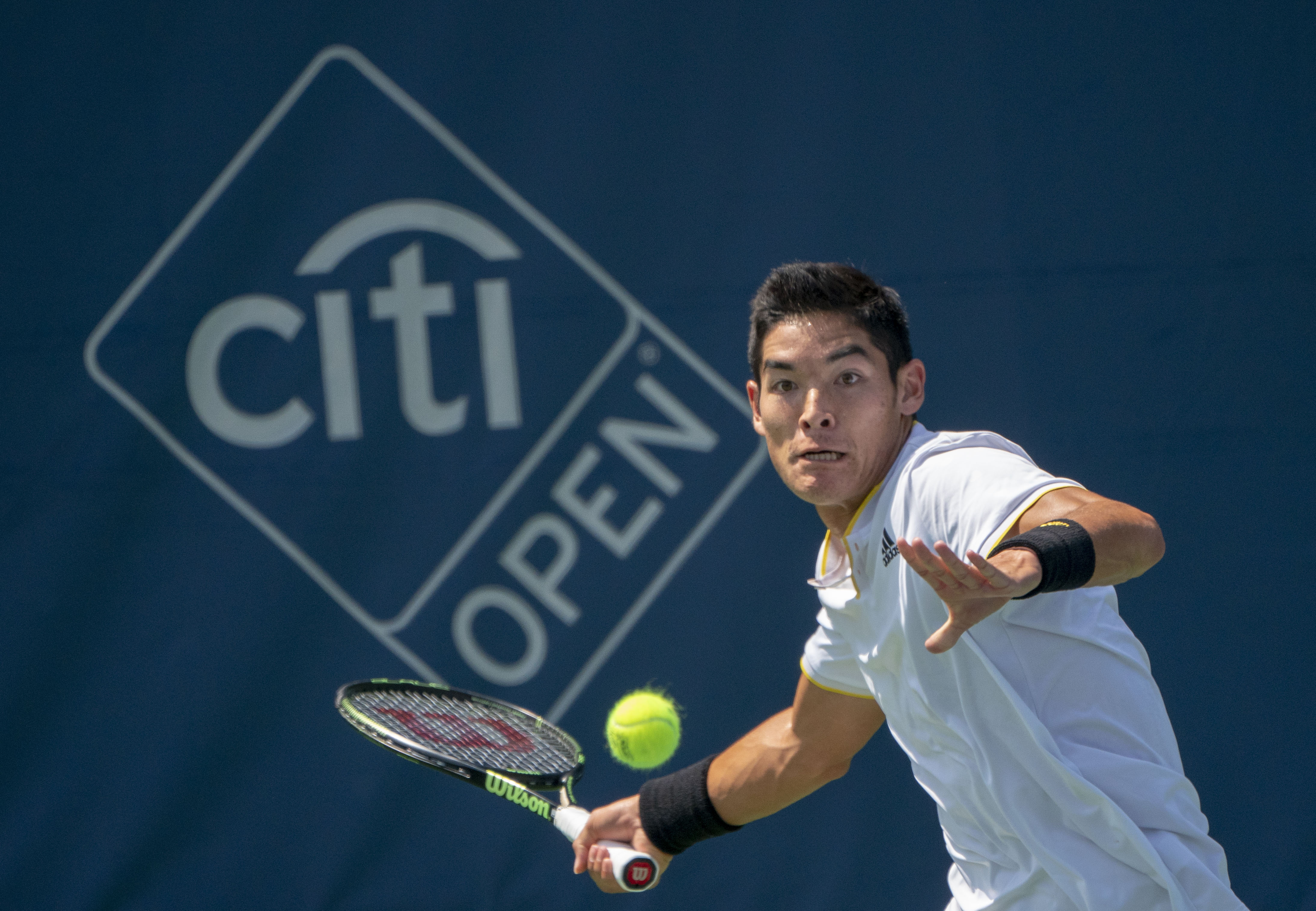
Kwiatkowski in 2018

After winning the NCAA singles championship, Kwiatkowski was awarded a wildcard into the main draw of the 2017 US Open. He faced the 23rd seed Mischa Zverev in the first round, losing in five sets.

He won his maiden Challenger title in Newport Beach in 2020. He was also awarded a wildcard into the main draw of the 2020 US Open, where he lost in the first round to Kwon Soon-woo in four sets.

In August 2024, he announced his retirement after playing his last singles match at the 2024 Winston-Salem Open but in August 2025, he was accepted into the tournament to play in the qualifying competition using protected ranking.

== Personal life ==
Thai-Son's parents are Wendi Le and Tim Kwiatkowski. He has a younger brother named Liem. His parents are both University of Virginia alumni. Kwiatkowski is of Vietnamese and Polish descent. Kwiatkowski majored in commerce.

On 23 February 2021, Thai-Son Kwiatkowski successfully obtained Vietnamese citizenship in order to play for Vietnam's national tennis team in upcoming tournaments. He immediately became the most accomplished tennis player to represent Vietnam after he obtained the citizenship and planned to represent the country in international competition. He is playing for Hung Thinh – Ho Chi Minh City team since October 2019.

Thai-Son is not the first foreign-born tennis player to be recruited by a Vietnamese domestic tennis team. Daniel Nguyen a Vietnamese American tennis player is playing for the Hai Dang - Tay Ninh team and obtained Vietnamese citizenship in 2019.

== ATP Challenger and ITF Tour finals ==
=== Singles: 9 (8 titles, 1 runner-up) ===
Legend (singles) ATP Challenger Tour (1–0) Futures/ITF World Tennis Tour (7–1)	Finals by surface Hard (7–1) Clay (1–0)

Result	W–L	Date	Tournament	Tier	Surface	Opponent	Score
Win	1–0	Dec 2016	Puerto Rico F1, Mayagüez	Futures	Hard	(United States) Alexios Halebian	6–1, 6–4
Win	2–0	Oct 2017	USA F33, Houston	Futures	Hard	(United States) Sebastian Korda	6–2, 6–2
Win	3–0	May 2018	Singapore F1, Singapore	Futures	Hard	(Japan) Soichiro Moritani	6–2, 6–2
Win	4–0	Jun 2018	Canada F3, Calgary	Futures	Hard	(United States) Paul Oosterbaan	6–4, 6–3
Win	5–0	Feb 2020	Newport Beach, USA	Challenger	Hard	(Colombia) Daniel Elahi Galán	6–4, 6–1
Win	6–0	Apr 2023	M15 Sunrise, USA	World Tennis Tour	Clay	(United States) Tristan McCormick	6–4, 7–6^{(7–5)}
Loss	6–1	Oct 2023	M15 Las Vegas, USA	World Tennis Tour	Hard	(Australia) Bernard Tomic	1–6, 6–4, 2–6
Win	7–1	Mar 2024	M25 Santo Domingo, Dominican Republic	World Tennis Tour	Hard	(Dominican Republic) Nick Hardt	6–4, 6–4
Win	8–1	Mar 2024	M25 Santo Domingo, Dominican Republic	World Tennis Tour	Hard	(Ecuador) Andrés Andrade	6–4, 7–6^{(7–3)}

=== Doubles: 14 (5 titles, 9 runner-ups) ===
Legend (doubles) ATP Challenger Tour (1–4) Futures/ITF World Tennis Tour (4–5)	Finals by surface Hard (5–6) Clay (0–3)

Result	W–L	Date	Tournament	Tier	Surface	Partner	Opponents	Score
Win	1–0	Jun 2016	USA F17, Charlottesville	Futures	Hard	(United States) Mac Styslinger	(Australia) Greg Jones (New Zealand) José Statham	6–4, 6–1
Win	2–0	Jun 2016	USA F18, Winston-Salem	Futures	Hard	(United States) Jared Hiltzik	(United States) Austin Smith (United States) Dennis Uspensky	6–4, 6–2
Loss	2–1	Aug 2016	Finland F1, Kaarina	Futures	Clay	(New Zealand) José Statham	(Finland) Herkko Pöllänen (Denmark) Mikael Torpegaard	7–6^{(7–4)}, 3–6, [6–10]
Loss	2–2	Dec 2016	Puerto Rico F1, Mayagüez	Futures	Hard	(United States) Quinton Vega	(Serbia) Nebojša Perić (Serbia) Ilija Vučić	1–6, 3–6
Win	3–2	Mar 2017	France F5, Toulouse	Futures	Hard (i)	(France) Fabien Reboul	(Belgium) Niels Desein (France) Yannick Jankovits	6–3, 7–6^{(7–4)}
Loss	3–3	Jun 2017	USA F20, Rochester	Futures	Clay	(United States) Luca Corinteli	(Canada) Hugo Di Feo (Denmark) Mikael Torpegaard	6–7^{(5–7)}, 4–6
Loss	3–4	Oct 2017	USA F33, Houston	Futures	Hard	(United States) Austin Krajicek	(United States) Aron Hiltzik (United States) Dennis Nevolo	6–7^{(3–7)}, 3–6
Loss	3–5	Dec 2017	Mexico F7, Metepec	Futures	Hard	(United States) John Paul Fruttero	(Ecuador) Gonzalo Escobar (Mexico) Manuel Sánchez	3–6, 3–6
Win	4–5	Jul 2018	Canada F4, Kelowna	Futures	Hard	(Republic of Ireland) Julian Bradley	(United States) Charlie Emhardt (United States) Samuel Shropshire	7–6^{(7–5)}, 7–5
Loss	4–6	Apr 2019	Tallahassee, USA	Challenger	Clay	(United States) Noah Rubin	(Venezuela) Roberto Maytín (Brazil) Fernando Romboli	2–6, 6–4, [7–10]
Loss	4–7	Jul 2019	Winnetka, USA	Challenger	Hard	(United States) Christopher Eubanks	(United States) JC Aragone (United States) Bradley Klahn	5–7, 4–6
Win	5–7	Mar 2020	Indian Wells, USA	Challenger	Hard	(United States) Denis Kudla	(United States) Sebastian Korda (United States) Mitchell Krueger	6–3, 2–6, [10–6]
Loss	5–8	Oct 2023	Charlottesville, USA	Challenger	Hard (i)	(United States) Denis Kudla	(Australia) John-Patrick Smith (Netherlands) Sem Verbeek	6–3, 3–6, [5–10]
Loss	5–9	Jan 2024	Indian Wells, USA	Challenger	Hard	(United States) Alex Lawson	(United States) Ryan Seggerman (United States) Patrik Trhac	2–6, 6–7^{(3–7)}
