= 2024 ITF Men's World Tennis Tour (April–June) =

The 2024 ITF Men's World Tennis Tour is the 2024 edition of the second-tier tour for men's professional tennis. It is organised by the International Tennis Federation and is a tier below the ATP Challenger Tour. The ITF Men's World Tennis Tour includes tournaments with prize money ranging from $15,000 to $25,000.

Since 2022, following the Russian invasion of Ukraine the ITF announced that players from Belarus and Russia could still play on the tour but would not be allowed to play under the flag of Belarus or Russia.

== Month ==
Key
M25 tournaments
M15 tournaments

=== April ===
Week of	Tournament	Winner	Runners-up	Semifinalists	Quarterfinalists
April 1	Sharm El Sheikh, Egypt; Hard; M25; Singles and doubles draws	(Poland) Kamil Majchrzak; 6–3, 6–2	(Egypt) Karim-Mohamed Maamoun	(Czech Republic) Marek Gengel (France) Robin Bertrand	(United Kingdom) Millen Hurrion (Bulgaria) Petr Nesterov (Ukraine) Illya Beloborodko (Uzbekistan) Khumoyun Sultanov
April 1	Sharm El Sheikh, Egypt; Hard; M25; Singles and doubles draws	(United Kingdom) Ben Jones (Switzerland) Jakub Paul; 6–2, 6–2	(Kazakhstan) Grigoriy Lomakin; Ilia Simakin	(Czech Republic) Marek Gengel (France) Robin Bertrand	(United Kingdom) Millen Hurrion (Bulgaria) Petr Nesterov (Ukraine) Illya Beloborodko (Uzbekistan) Khumoyun Sultanov
April 1	Santa Margherita di Pula, Italy; Clay; M25; Singles and doubles draws	(Denmark) Elmer Møller; 6–2, 6–3	(Italy) Tommaso Compagnucci	(Poland) Daniel Michalski (Italy) Samuele Pieri	(Italy) Michele Ribecai (Israel) Yshai Oliel (Italy) Gianmarco Ferrari (Turkey) Ergi Kırkın
April 1	Santa Margherita di Pula, Italy; Clay; M25; Singles and doubles draws	(Italy) Niccolò Catini (Italy) Tommaso Compagnucci; 4–6, 6–3, [10–6]	(Italy) Stefano D'Agostino (Italy) Christian Fellin	(Poland) Daniel Michalski (Italy) Samuele Pieri	(Italy) Michele Ribecai (Israel) Yshai Oliel (Italy) Gianmarco Ferrari (Turkey) Ergi Kırkın
April 1	Reus, Spain; Clay; M25; Singles and doubles draws	(Germany) Nicola Kuhn; 5–7, 7–6^{(7–2)}, 6–3	(United Kingdom) Anton Matusevich	(Slovakia) Peter Benjamín Privara (Switzerland) Rémy Bertola	(Argentina) Hernán Casanova (Spain) Alejandro Manzanera Pertusa (Argentina) Julio César Porras (Chile) Diego Fernández Flores
April 1	Reus, Spain; Clay; M25; Singles and doubles draws	(Bulgaria) Anthony Genov (Spain) Bruno Pujol Navarro; 3–6, 6–3, [10–8]	(Switzerland) Rémy Bertola (Italy) Augusto Virgili	(Slovakia) Peter Benjamín Privara (Switzerland) Rémy Bertola	(Argentina) Hernán Casanova (Spain) Alejandro Manzanera Pertusa (Argentina) Julio César Porras (Chile) Diego Fernández Flores
April 1	Hammamet, Tunisia; Clay; M25; Singles and doubles draws	(France) Manuel Guinard; 6–0, 6–3	(Ukraine) Oleksandr Ovcharenko	(Italy) Gianluca Cadenasso (France) Constantin Bittoun Kouzmine	(France) Maxence Bertimon (Italy) Gabriele Maria Noce (Italy) Daniel Bagnolini (Italy) Noah Perfetti
April 1	Hammamet, Tunisia; Clay; M25; Singles and doubles draws	(France) Constantin Bittoun Kouzmine (United Kingdom) Jay Clarke; 6–3, 6–4	Aleksandr Lobanov (Tunisia) Aziz Ouakaa	(Italy) Gianluca Cadenasso (France) Constantin Bittoun Kouzmine	(France) Maxence Bertimon (Italy) Gabriele Maria Noce (Italy) Daniel Bagnolini (Italy) Noah Perfetti
April 1	Bragado, Argentina; Clay; M15; Singles and doubles draws	(Argentina) Alejo Lorenzo Lingua Lavallén; 6–2, 6–1	(Argentina) Bautista Vilicich	(Uruguay) Joaquín Aguilar Cardozo (Argentina) Lautaro Midón	(Argentina) Lautaro Agustín Falabella (United States) Alexander Stater (Argentina) Matías Franco Descotte (Argentina) Luciano Emanuel Ambrogi
April 1	Bragado, Argentina; Clay; M15; Singles and doubles draws	(Argentina) Thiago Cigarrán (Argentina) Alejo Lorenzo Lingua Lavallén; 6–2, 6–2	(Argentina) Juan Estévez (Argentina) Ezequiel Monferrer	(Uruguay) Joaquín Aguilar Cardozo (Argentina) Lautaro Midón	(Argentina) Lautaro Agustín Falabella (United States) Alexander Stater (Argentina) Matías Franco Descotte (Argentina) Luciano Emanuel Ambrogi
April 1	Lons-le-Saunier, France; Hard (i); M15; Singles and doubles draws	(France) Axel Garcian; 7–6^{(7–4)}, 7–5	(France) Arthur Bouquier	(France) Loann Massard (France) Maé Malige	(France) Louis Dussin (France) Thomas Deschamps; Alexey Vatutin (Germany) Max Stenzer
April 1	Lons-le-Saunier, France; Hard (i); M15; Singles and doubles draws	(France) Axel Garcian (France) Arthur Nagel; 6–4, 6–2	(France) Louis Dussin (France) Cyril Vandermeersch	(France) Loann Massard (France) Maé Malige	(France) Louis Dussin (France) Thomas Deschamps; Alexey Vatutin (Germany) Max Stenzer
April 1	Kashiwa, Japan; Hard; M15; Singles and doubles draws	(Chinese Taipei) Hsu Yu-hsiou; 3–6, 7–5, 6–4	(Japan) Masamichi Imamura	(Japan) Ryotaro Taguchi (Japan) Sora Fukuda	(Japan) Keisuke Saitoh (Chinese Taipei) Ray Ho (Australia) Jake Delaney (Japan) Shintaro Imai
April 1	Kashiwa, Japan; Hard; M15; Singles and doubles draws	(Japan) Masamichi Imamura (Japan) Takeru Yuzuki; 4–6, 6–2, [10–8]	(Chinese Taipei) Ray Ho (South Korea) Nam Ji-sung	(Japan) Ryotaro Taguchi (Japan) Sora Fukuda	(Japan) Keisuke Saitoh (Chinese Taipei) Ray Ho (Australia) Jake Delaney (Japan) Shintaro Imai
April 1	Monastir, Tunisia; Hard; M15; Singles and doubles draws	(United Kingdom) Giles Hussey; 0–6, 6–4, 6–4	(Slovakia) Lukáš Pokorný	(United States) William Grant; Egor Agafonov	(Italy) Federico Cinà (Australia) Moerani Bouzige (Portugal) Tiago Pereira (Ivory Coast) Eliakim Coulibaly
April 1	Monastir, Tunisia; Hard; M15; Singles and doubles draws	(Bulgaria) Alexander Donski (Portugal) Tiago Pereira; 6–4, 6–2	(United States) Jordan Chiu (Sweden) Fred Simonsson	(United States) William Grant; Egor Agafonov	(Italy) Federico Cinà (Australia) Moerani Bouzige (Portugal) Tiago Pereira (Ivory Coast) Eliakim Coulibaly
April 1	Antalya, Turkey; Clay; M15; Singles and doubles draws	Evgenii Tiurnev; 6–0, 2–6, 6–0	(Germany) Liam Gavrielides	(Italy) Giuseppe La Vela (Brazil) João Eduardo Schiessl	(Netherlands) Niels Visker (Germany) David Fix; Maxim Zhukov (Germany) Marlon Vankan
April 1	Antalya, Turkey; Clay; M15; Singles and doubles draws	(Germany) John Sperle (Germany) Marlon Vankan; 7–6^{(7–5)}, 6–1	(Uzbekistan) Sergey Fomin; Pavel Verbin	(Italy) Giuseppe La Vela (Brazil) João Eduardo Schiessl	(Netherlands) Niels Visker (Germany) David Fix; Maxim Zhukov (Germany) Marlon Vankan
April 8	Sharm El Sheikh, Egypt; Hard; M25; Singles and doubles draws	(Egypt) Mohamed Safwat; 3–6, 6–2, 6–2	(France) Robin Bertrand	(Egypt) Amr Elsayed (Ukraine) Vadym Ursu	(Uzbekistan) Khumoyun Sultanov (South Africa) Kris van Wyk (Australia) Matt Hulme (Czech Republic) Matěj Vocel
April 8	Sharm El Sheikh, Egypt; Hard; M25; Singles and doubles draws	(United Kingdom) Ben Jones (Switzerland) Jakub Paul; 2–6, 6–4, [10–8]	(United Kingdom) Hamish Stewart (United Kingdom) Harry Wendelken	(Egypt) Amr Elsayed (Ukraine) Vadym Ursu	(Uzbekistan) Khumoyun Sultanov (South Africa) Kris van Wyk (Australia) Matt Hulme (Czech Republic) Matěj Vocel
April 8	Santa Margherita di Pula, Italy; Clay; M25; Singles and doubles draws	(Netherlands) Jelle Sels; 6–3, 6–2	(Italy) Marcello Serafini	(Italy) Andrea Guerrieri (Israel) Yshai Oliel	Kirill Kivattsev (Italy) Luca Potenza (Australia) Matthew Dellavedova (Poland) Daniel Michalski
April 8	Santa Margherita di Pula, Italy; Clay; M25; Singles and doubles draws	(Belgium) Buvaysar Gadamauri (Netherlands) Jelle Sels; 6–4, 6–1	(Italy) Luca Potenza (Italy) Marcello Serafini	(Italy) Andrea Guerrieri (Israel) Yshai Oliel	Kirill Kivattsev (Italy) Luca Potenza (Australia) Matthew Dellavedova (Poland) Daniel Michalski
April 8	Hammamet, Tunisia; Clay; M25; Singles and doubles draws	(Tunisia) Aziz Dougaz; 7–6^{(8–6)}, 6–2	(Austria) Sandro Kopp	(Lithuania) Edas Butvilas (Poland) Paweł Juszczak	(Switzerland) Jérôme Kym (Germany) Peter Heller (Ukraine) Oleksandr Ovcharenko (France) Arthur Bonnaud
April 8	Hammamet, Tunisia; Clay; M25; Singles and doubles draws	(Belgium) Raphaël Collignon (Switzerland) Jérôme Kym; 6–4, 7–5	(Italy) Luca Giacomini (Italy) Giuseppe Tresca	(Lithuania) Edas Butvilas (Poland) Paweł Juszczak	(Switzerland) Jérôme Kym (Germany) Peter Heller (Ukraine) Oleksandr Ovcharenko (France) Arthur Bonnaud
April 8	Quillota, Chile; Clay; M15; Singles and doubles draws	(Japan) Kaichi Uchida; 6–3, 6–4	(Chile) Ignacio Antonio Becerra Otárola	(Uruguay) Franco Roncadelli (Argentina) Fernando Cavallo	(Argentina) Juan Estévez (Chile) Daniel Antonio Núñez (Argentina) Juan Bautista Otegui (Argentina) Ignacio Monzón
April 8	Quillota, Chile; Clay; M15; Singles and doubles draws	(Argentina) Juan Bautista Otegui (Venezuela) Brandon Pérez; 6–2, 6–4	(Uruguay) Franco Roncadelli (Brazil) Paulo André Saraiva dos Santos	(Uruguay) Franco Roncadelli (Argentina) Fernando Cavallo	(Argentina) Juan Estévez (Chile) Daniel Antonio Núñez (Argentina) Juan Bautista Otegui (Argentina) Ignacio Monzón
April 8	Telde, Spain; Clay; M15; Singles and doubles draws	(Spain) Alejandro Manzanera Pertusa; 6–7^{(6–8)}, 6–3, 6–0	(Spain) Tomás Currás Abasolo	(United States) Dali Blanch (Bulgaria) Iliyan Radulov	(Denmark) Kane Bonsach Ganley (Hungary) Péter Fajta (Spain) Diego Augusto Barreto Sánchez (Brazil) Oscar José Gutierrez
April 8	Telde, Spain; Clay; M15; Singles and doubles draws	(Spain) Diego Augusto Barreto Sánchez (Spain) Alejandro Manzanera Pertusa; 6–1, 5–7, [10–5]	(Italy) Marco Miceli (Spain) Bruno Pujol Navarro	(United States) Dali Blanch (Bulgaria) Iliyan Radulov	(Denmark) Kane Bonsach Ganley (Hungary) Péter Fajta (Spain) Diego Augusto Barreto Sánchez (Brazil) Oscar José Gutierrez
April 8	Monastir, Tunisia; Hard; M15; Singles and doubles draws	(Slovakia) Lukáš Pokorný; 7–5, 6–1	(United Kingdom) Stuart Parker	(United Kingdom) Giles Hussey (Australia) Moerani Bouzige	(Luxembourg) Alex Knaff; Evgeny Karlovskiy (Germany) Max Wiskandt (Estonia) Kristjan Tamm
April 8	Monastir, Tunisia; Hard; M15; Singles and doubles draws	(Uzbekistan) Denis Istomin; Evgeny Karlovskiy; Walkover	(United Kingdom) James Davis (United Kingdom) Giles Hussey	(United Kingdom) Giles Hussey (Australia) Moerani Bouzige	(Luxembourg) Alex Knaff; Evgeny Karlovskiy (Germany) Max Wiskandt (Estonia) Kristjan Tamm
April 8	Antalya, Turkey; Clay; M15; Singles and doubles draws	(Italy) Facundo Juárez; 3–6, 7–6^{(7–2)}, 6–4	(Ukraine) Oleg Prihodko	Evgenii Tiurnev (Estonia) Markus Mölder	(Romania) Ștefan Paloși (Ukraine) Viacheslav Bielinskyi (Serbia) Nikola Milojević (Germany) John Sperle
April 8	Antalya, Turkey; Clay; M15; Singles and doubles draws	(Ukraine) Viacheslav Bielinskyi (Ukraine) Vladyslav Orlov; 6–1, 6–3	(Switzerland) Dario Huber (Germany) Jacob Kahoun	Evgenii Tiurnev (Estonia) Markus Mölder	(Romania) Ștefan Paloși (Ukraine) Viacheslav Bielinskyi (Serbia) Nikola Milojević (Germany) John Sperle
April 15	Santa Margherita di Pula, Italy; Clay; M25; Singles and doubles draws	(Italy) Gabriele Piraino; 7–5, 6–4	Kirill Kivattsev	(France) Clément Chidekh (United States) Omni Kumar	(Spain) Carlos López Montagud (Italy) Massimo Giunta (Italy) Noah Perfetti (Italy) Michele Ribecai
April 15	Santa Margherita di Pula, Italy; Clay; M25; Singles and doubles draws	(Italy) Luca Potenza (Italy) Giorgio Ricca; 6–4, 6–3	(Italy) Giovanni Oradini (Italy) Marcello Serafini	(France) Clément Chidekh (United States) Omni Kumar	(Spain) Carlos López Montagud (Italy) Massimo Giunta (Italy) Noah Perfetti (Italy) Michele Ribecai
April 15	Hammamet, Tunisia; Clay; M25; Singles and doubles draws	(Belgium) Raphaël Collignon; 4–6, 6–1, 6–1	(Tunisia) Aziz Dougaz	(Germany) Nicola Kuhn (Austria) Sandro Kopp	(Poland) Paweł Juszczak (Netherlands) Ryan Nijboer (Lithuania) Edas Butvilas (France) Florent Bax
April 15	Hammamet, Tunisia; Clay; M25; Singles and doubles draws	Aleksandr Lobanov (Tunisia) Aziz Ouakaa; 6–3, 6–4	(Netherlands) Michiel de Krom (Netherlands) Ryan Nijboer	(Germany) Nicola Kuhn (Austria) Sandro Kopp	(Poland) Paweł Juszczak (Netherlands) Ryan Nijboer (Lithuania) Edas Butvilas (France) Florent Bax
April 15	Santiago, Chile; Clay; M15; Singles and doubles draws	(Argentina) Facundo Mena; 6–2, 6–3	(Argentina) Fermín Tenti	(United States) Thomas Brown (Chile) Daniel Antonio Núñez	(Brazil) Paulo André Saraiva dos Santos (Chile) Ignacio Antonio Becerra Otárola (Argentina) Franco Ribero (Brazil) Gabriel Décamps
April 15	Santiago, Chile; Clay; M15; Singles and doubles draws	(Brazil) Joaquim Almeida (Brazil) Rafael Tosetto; 6–4, 6–3	(Chile) Alejandro Bancalari (Chile) Benjamín Ignacio Torres Fernández	(United States) Thomas Brown (Chile) Daniel Antonio Núñez	(Brazil) Paulo André Saraiva dos Santos (Chile) Ignacio Antonio Becerra Otárola (Argentina) Franco Ribero (Brazil) Gabriel Décamps
April 15	Dubrovnik, Croatia; Clay; M15; Singles and doubles draws	(France) Maxime Chazal; 6–2, 6–4	(Austria) Neil Oberleitner	(Bosnia and Herzegovina) Mirza Bašić (Slovakia) Miloš Karol	(Italy) Valerio Perruzza (Argentina) Sean Hess (Italy) Carlo Alberto Caniato (Italy) Pietro Marino
April 15	Dubrovnik, Croatia; Clay; M15; Singles and doubles draws	(Austria) Neil Oberleitner (Germany) Adrian Oetzbach; 7–6^{(7–2)}, 6–3	(Austria) David Pichler (Czech Republic) Michael Vrbenský	(Bosnia and Herzegovina) Mirza Bašić (Slovakia) Miloš Karol	(Italy) Valerio Perruzza (Argentina) Sean Hess (Italy) Carlo Alberto Caniato (Italy) Pietro Marino
April 15	Azay-le-Rideau, France; Hard (i); M15; Singles and doubles draws	(France) Arthur Bouquier; 6–1, 6–1	(France) Alexandre Reco	(France) Gleb Sakharov (United Kingdom) Emile Hudd	(France) Yanis Ghazouani Durand (France) Samuel Brosset (France) Louis Dussin (France) Kenny de Schepper
April 15	Azay-le-Rideau, France; Hard (i); M15; Singles and doubles draws	(Australia) Mitchell Harper (Italy) Filippo Romano; 2–6, 6–4, [10–7]	(France) Axel Garcian (France) Arthur Nagel	(France) Gleb Sakharov (United Kingdom) Emile Hudd	(France) Yanis Ghazouani Durand (France) Samuel Brosset (France) Louis Dussin (France) Kenny de Schepper
April 15	Shymkent, Kazakhstan; Clay; M15; Singles and doubles draws	(Uzbekistan) Sergey Fomin; 7–6^{(7–4)}, 6–2	Bekhan Atlangeriev	(India) Karan Singh; Evgenii Tiurnev	(Ukraine) Eric Vanshelboim; Denis Klok; Savva Polukhin (India) Dev Javia
April 15	Shymkent, Kazakhstan; Clay; M15; Singles and doubles draws	(Kazakhstan) Grigoriy Lomakin; Pavel Verbin; 7–6^{(7–1)}, 6–3	(Georgia (country)) Aleksandre Bakshi (Germany) Niklas Schell	(India) Karan Singh; Evgenii Tiurnev	(Ukraine) Eric Vanshelboim; Denis Klok; Savva Polukhin (India) Dev Javia
April 15	Kuršumlijska Banja, Serbia; Clay; M15; Singles and doubles draws	(Serbia) Stefan Popović; 6–4, 6–1	(Moldova) Ilya Snițari	(Bulgaria) Simon Anthony Ivanov (France) Luka Pavlovic	(Serbia) Viktor Jović (Romania) Dan Alexandru Tomescu (Morocco) Elliot Benchetrit (Serbia) Zoran Ludoški
April 15	Kuršumlijska Banja, Serbia; Clay; M15; Singles and doubles draws	(Serbia) Viktor Jović (Serbia) Kristijan Juhas; 6–1, 7–6^{(7–3)}	(Romania) Dragoș Nicolae Cazacu (Japan) Yamato Sueoka	(Bulgaria) Simon Anthony Ivanov (France) Luka Pavlovic	(Serbia) Viktor Jović (Romania) Dan Alexandru Tomescu (Morocco) Elliot Benchetrit (Serbia) Zoran Ludoški
April 15	Telde, Spain; Clay; M15; Singles and doubles draws	(Slovakia) Martin Kližan; 3–6, 6–3, 7–5	(Spain) Diego Augusto Barreto Sánchez	(United States) Darwin Blanch (Chile) Diego Fernández Flores	(Spain) Albert Pedrico Kravtsov (Spain) Alejandro Manzanera Pertusa (France) Benjamin Pietri (Bulgaria) Iliyan Radulov
April 15	Telde, Spain; Clay; M15; Singles and doubles draws	(France) Benjamin Pietri (Spain) Bruno Pujol Navarro; 6–3, 6–4	(Spain) Diego Augusto Barreto Sánchez (United States) Dali Blanch	(United States) Darwin Blanch (Chile) Diego Fernández Flores	(Spain) Albert Pedrico Kravtsov (Spain) Alejandro Manzanera Pertusa (France) Benjamin Pietri (Bulgaria) Iliyan Radulov
April 15	Monastir, Tunisia; Hard; M15; Singles and doubles draws	(France) Robin Bertrand; 7–6^{(7–3)}, 6–3	(Ivory Coast) Eliakim Coulibaly	(United States) Joshua Sheehy (Germany) Max Wiskandt	(Estonia) Kristjan Tamm (Luxembourg) Alex Knaff (United Kingdom) Stuart Parker (Australia) Moerani Bouzige
April 15	Monastir, Tunisia; Hard; M15; Singles and doubles draws	Egor Agafonov; Aliaksandr Liaonenka; 6–1, 4–6, [10–6]	(Antigua and Barbuda) Jody Maginley (United States) Joshua Sheehy	(United States) Joshua Sheehy (Germany) Max Wiskandt	(Estonia) Kristjan Tamm (Luxembourg) Alex Knaff (United Kingdom) Stuart Parker (Australia) Moerani Bouzige
April 15	Antalya, Turkey; Clay; M15; Singles and doubles draws	(Italy) Facundo Juárez; 6–2, 6–3	(South Africa) Philip Henning	(Italy) Andrea Picchione (Georgia (country)) Aleksandre Metreveli	(Italy) Giuseppe La Vela (Argentina) Juan Pablo Paz (Turkey) Mert Naci Türker (Japan) Kokoro Isomura
April 15	Antalya, Turkey; Clay; M15; Singles and doubles draws	(Czech Republic) Jiří Barnat (Slovakia) Tomáš Lánik; 7–6^{(7–5)}, 6–2	(United Kingdom) Felix Mischker (Argentina) Juan Pablo Paz	(Italy) Andrea Picchione (Georgia (country)) Aleksandre Metreveli	(Italy) Giuseppe La Vela (Argentina) Juan Pablo Paz (Turkey) Mert Naci Türker (Japan) Kokoro Isomura
April 22	Mosquera, Colombia; Clay; M25; Singles and doubles draws	(Colombia) Juan Sebastián Gómez; 6–3, 6–4	(United States) Harrison Adams	(Zimbabwe) Benjamin Lock (Netherlands) Thijmen Loof	(Brazil) Mateo Barreiros Reyes (Colombia) Miguel Tobón (Argentina) Juan Estévez (Colombia) Juan Sebastián Osorio
April 22	Mosquera, Colombia; Clay; M25; Singles and doubles draws	(Zimbabwe) Benjamin Lock (Zimbabwe) Courtney John Lock; 7–6^{(7–3)}, 7–5	(Dominican Republic) Peter Bertran (Netherlands) Thijmen Loof	(Zimbabwe) Benjamin Lock (Netherlands) Thijmen Loof	(Brazil) Mateo Barreiros Reyes (Colombia) Miguel Tobón (Argentina) Juan Estévez (Colombia) Juan Sebastián Osorio
April 22	Angers, France; Clay (i); M25; Singles and doubles draws	(Belgium) Raphaël Collignon; 6–2, 6–4	(Tunisia) Aziz Dougaz	(France) Lucas Bouquet (France) Lilian Marmousez	(France) Constantin Bittoun Kouzmine (France) Thomas Setodji; Alexey Vatutin (France) Mathys Erhard
April 22	Angers, France; Clay (i); M25; Singles and doubles draws	(France) Dan Added (France) Constantin Bittoun Kouzmine; 6–4, 5–7, [11–9]	(France) Arthur Nagel (Italy) Filippo Romano	(France) Lucas Bouquet (France) Lilian Marmousez	(France) Constantin Bittoun Kouzmine (France) Thomas Setodji; Alexey Vatutin (France) Mathys Erhard
April 22	Santa Margherita di Pula, Italy; Clay; M25; Singles and doubles draws	(Italy) Andrea Picchione; 6–0, 6–2	(Italy) Federico Iannaccone	(Spain) Carlos Sánchez Jover (Spain) Carlos López Montagud	(France) Valentin Royer (Italy) Luca Potenza (United States) Omni Kumar (Italy) Gabriele Maria Noce
April 22	Santa Margherita di Pula, Italy; Clay; M25; Singles and doubles draws	(Italy) Luca Potenza (Italy) Stefano Reitano; 6–2, 6–4	(Italy) Lorenzo Lorusso (Italy) Samuele Pieri	(Spain) Carlos Sánchez Jover (Spain) Carlos López Montagud	(France) Valentin Royer (Italy) Luca Potenza (United States) Omni Kumar (Italy) Gabriele Maria Noce
April 22	Nottingham, United Kingdom; Hard; M25; Singles and doubles draws	(United Kingdom) Paul Jubb; 3–6, 6–2, 6–3	(United Kingdom) Charles Broom	(Australia) Blake Mott (United Kingdom) Giles Hussey	(United Kingdom) Ewen Lumsden (Poland) Filip Peliwo (France) Robin Bertrand (United Kingdom) Finn Bass
April 22	Nottingham, United Kingdom; Hard; M25; Singles and doubles draws	(United Kingdom) Charles Broom (United Kingdom) Daniel Little; 5–7, 7–5, [10–6]	(United Kingdom) James Davis (United Kingdom) Matthew Summers	(Australia) Blake Mott (United Kingdom) Giles Hussey	(United Kingdom) Ewen Lumsden (Poland) Filip Peliwo (France) Robin Bertrand (United Kingdom) Finn Bass
April 22	Split, Croatia; Clay; M15; Singles and doubles draws	(Czech Republic) Michael Vrbenský; 7–5, 7–6^{(7–3)}	(Croatia) Luka Mikrut	(Austria) Neil Oberleitner (Croatia) Matej Dodig	(Ukraine) Viacheslav Bielinskyi (France) Maxime Chazal (France) Émilien Voisin (Italy) Valerio Perruzza
April 22	Split, Croatia; Clay; M15; Singles and doubles draws	(Ukraine) Viacheslav Bielinskyi (Poland) Jasza Szajrych; 6–4, 6–2	(Sweden) Adam Heinonen (Croatia) Marino Jakić	(Austria) Neil Oberleitner (Croatia) Matej Dodig	(Ukraine) Viacheslav Bielinskyi (France) Maxime Chazal (France) Émilien Voisin (Italy) Valerio Perruzza
April 22	Meerbusch, Germany; Clay; M15; Singles and doubles draws	(Republic of Ireland) Michael Agwi; 6–4, 6–2	(Germany) John Sperle	(Netherlands) Alec Deckers (Germany) Adrian Oetzbach	(Serbia) Dušan Obradović (Ukraine) Aleksandr Braynin (Czech Republic) Jan Hrazdil (Germany) Patrick Zahraj
April 22	Meerbusch, Germany; Clay; M15; Singles and doubles draws	(Netherlands) Sander Jong (Netherlands) Rik Muller; 6–3, 7–5	(Germany) Florian Broska (Austria) Gregor Ramskogler	(Netherlands) Alec Deckers (Germany) Adrian Oetzbach	(Serbia) Dušan Obradović (Ukraine) Aleksandr Braynin (Czech Republic) Jan Hrazdil (Germany) Patrick Zahraj
April 22	Shymkent, Kazakhstan; Clay; M15; Singles and doubles draws	Savva Polukhin; 6–2, 6–3	(Ukraine) Vladyslav Orlov	(Uzbekistan) Maxim Shin (Spain) Jordi García Mestre	(India) Dev Javia (Italy) Federico Campana; Maxim Zhukov (Italy) Nicola Rispoli
April 22	Shymkent, Kazakhstan; Clay; M15; Singles and doubles draws	(Kazakhstan) Grigoriy Lomakin; Pavel Verbin; 7–6^{(11–9)}, 6–3	(India) S D Prajwal Dev (India) Sai Karteek Reddy Ganta	(Uzbekistan) Maxim Shin (Spain) Jordi García Mestre	(India) Dev Javia (Italy) Federico Campana; Maxim Zhukov (Italy) Nicola Rispoli
April 22	Kuršumlijska Banja, Serbia; Clay; M15; Singles and doubles draws	(Serbia) Stefan Popović; 6–4, 6–2	(Italy) Mariano Tammaro	(Serbia) Nikola Milojević (Belgium) Jack Logé	(Germany) Stefan Peter Hampe (Belgium) Émilien Demanet (Serbia) Boris Butulija (Serbia) Lazar Vojinović
April 22	Kuršumlijska Banja, Serbia; Clay; M15; Singles and doubles draws	(Netherlands) Brian Bozemoj (Netherlands) Tom Clavel; 6–4, 6–0	(Nigeria) Christopher Bulus (Serbia) Tadija Radovanović	(Serbia) Nikola Milojević (Belgium) Jack Logé	(Germany) Stefan Peter Hampe (Belgium) Émilien Demanet (Serbia) Boris Butulija (Serbia) Lazar Vojinović
April 22	Sanxenxo, Spain; Hard; M15; Singles and doubles draws	(Argentina) Julio César Porras; 6–2, 6–1	(Chile) Diego Fernández Flores	(Portugal) Tiago Pereira; Svyatoslav Gulin	(Germany) Maik Steiner (Australia) Moerani Bouzige (Spain) Diego Augusto Barreto Sánchez (Denmark) Philip Hjorth
April 22	Sanxenxo, Spain; Hard; M15; Singles and doubles draws	(Portugal) Rodrigo Fernandes (Portugal) Gonçalo Marques; 3–6, 7–6^{(7–2)}, [10–7]	(Spain) Rafael Izquierdo Luque (Portugal) Tiago Pereira	(Portugal) Tiago Pereira; Svyatoslav Gulin	(Germany) Maik Steiner (Australia) Moerani Bouzige (Spain) Diego Augusto Barreto Sánchez (Denmark) Philip Hjorth
April 22	Monastir, Tunisia; Hard; M15; Singles and doubles draws	(Portugal) Pedro Araújo; 2–6, 6–2, 6–3	(Japan) Takuya Kumasaka	(South Africa) Kris van Wyk (Cyprus) Menelaos Efstathiou	(Greece) Demetris Azoides (Algeria) Nazim Makhlouf (Germany) Max Wiskandt (Ivory Coast) Eliakim Coulibaly
April 22	Monastir, Tunisia; Hard; M15; Singles and doubles draws	Aleksandr Lobanov; Alexey Nesterov; 6–3, 6–1	(Ghana) Abraham Asaba (Canada) Dan Martin	(South Africa) Kris van Wyk (Cyprus) Menelaos Efstathiou	(Greece) Demetris Azoides (Algeria) Nazim Makhlouf (Germany) Max Wiskandt (Ivory Coast) Eliakim Coulibaly
April 22	Antalya, Turkey; Clay; M15; Singles and doubles draws	(Switzerland) Jérôme Kym; 7–5, 6–2	(Bulgaria) Yanaki Milev	(Netherlands) Deney Wassermann (Netherlands) Stijn Slump	(Turkey) Kuzey Çekirge (Italy) Alexandr Binda (Japan) Kokoro Isomura (Italy) Gian Marco Ortenzi
April 22	Antalya, Turkey; Clay; M15; Singles and doubles draws	(Czech Republic) Jiří Barnat (Slovakia) Tomáš Lánik; 6–4, 6–1	(Bulgaria) Dinko Dinev (Austria) Matthias Ujvary	(Netherlands) Deney Wassermann (Netherlands) Stijn Slump	(Turkey) Kuzey Çekirge (Italy) Alexandr Binda (Japan) Kokoro Isomura (Italy) Gian Marco Ortenzi
April 22	Vero Beach, United States; Clay; M15; Singles and doubles draws	(United States) Garrett Johns; 7–6^{(7–1)}, 6–2	(United States) Victor Lilov	(United States) Miles Jones (United States) William Grant	(Bulgaria) Dian Nedev (France) Étienne Donnet (United States) Chad Kissell (United States) Rudy Quan
April 22	Vero Beach, United States; Clay; M15; Singles and doubles draws	(United States) Alexander Razeghi (United States) Cooper Woestendick; 6–4, 4–6, [10–3]	(United States) Alex Jones (United States) Miles Jones	(United States) Miles Jones (United States) William Grant	(Bulgaria) Dian Nedev (France) Étienne Donnet (United States) Chad Kissell (United States) Rudy Quan
April 29	Anapoima, Colombia; Clay; M25; Singles and doubles draws	(Colombia) Nicolás Mejía; 6–2, 6–2	(New Zealand) Kiranpal Pannu	(United States) Harrison Adams (Zimbabwe) Benjamin Lock	(Japan) Leo Vithoontien (Brazil) Mateo Barreiros Reyes (Dominican Republic) Peter Bertran (Colombia) Juan Sebastián Gómez
April 29	Anapoima, Colombia; Clay; M25; Singles and doubles draws	Ivan Denisov (Chile) Daniel Antonio Núñez; 6–4, 6–2	(Zimbabwe) Benjamin Lock (Zimbabwe) Courtney John Lock	(United States) Harrison Adams (Zimbabwe) Benjamin Lock	(Japan) Leo Vithoontien (Brazil) Mateo Barreiros Reyes (Dominican Republic) Peter Bertran (Colombia) Juan Sebastián Gómez
April 29	Santa Margherita di Pula, Italy; Clay; M25; Singles and doubles draws	(United Kingdom) Jay Clarke; 7–6^{(7–4)}, 3–6, 6–4	(Spain) Carlos Sánchez Jover	(Argentina) Juan Bautista Otegui (Italy) Alexander Weis	(Italy) Gianmarco Ferrari (United States) Omni Kumar (Denmark) Elmer Møller (Switzerland) Damien Wenger
April 29	Santa Margherita di Pula, Italy; Clay; M25; Singles and doubles draws	(Argentina) Mariano Kestelboim (Brazil) Gabriel Roveri Sidney; Walkover	(Germany) Kai Wehnelt (Germany) Patrick Zahraj	(Argentina) Juan Bautista Otegui (Italy) Alexander Weis	(Italy) Gianmarco Ferrari (United States) Omni Kumar (Denmark) Elmer Møller (Switzerland) Damien Wenger
April 29	Xalapa, Mexico; Hard; M25; Singles and doubles draws	(Mexico) Rodrigo Pacheco Méndez; 6–7^{(1–7)}, 7–5, 6–4	(Australia) Bernard Tomic	(Mexico) Ernesto Escobedo (United Kingdom) Aidan McHugh	(United States) Andre Ilagan (United States) Ezekiel Clark (Mexico) Alan Fernando Rubio Fierros (Australia) Oliver Anderson
April 29	Xalapa, Mexico; Hard; M25; Singles and doubles draws	(Mexico) Alan Fernando Rubio Fierros (United States) Noah Schachter; 7–6^{(7–0)}, 6–3	(Antigua and Barbuda) Jody Maginley (United States) Evan Zhu	(Mexico) Ernesto Escobedo (United Kingdom) Aidan McHugh	(United States) Andre Ilagan (United States) Ezekiel Clark (Mexico) Alan Fernando Rubio Fierros (Australia) Oliver Anderson
April 29	Sabadell, Spain; Clay; M25; Singles and doubles draws	(Spain) Nikolás Sánchez Izquierdo; 6–4, 4–6, 6–3	(Spain) Miguel Damas	(Argentina) Andrea Collarini (Spain) Daniel Rincón	(Spain) Oriol Roca Batalla (Ukraine) Eric Vanshelboim (Romania) Nicholas David Ionel (France) Florent Bax
April 29	Sabadell, Spain; Clay; M25; Singles and doubles draws	(Spain) Daniel Rincón (Spain) Alejandro Turriziani Álvarez; 6–4, 6–4	(Spain) David Pérez Sanz (Ukraine) Eric Vanshelboim	(Argentina) Andrea Collarini (Spain) Daniel Rincón	(Spain) Oriol Roca Batalla (Ukraine) Eric Vanshelboim (Romania) Nicholas David Ionel (France) Florent Bax
April 29	Nottingham, United Kingdom; Hard; M25; Singles and doubles draws	(United Kingdom) Charles Broom; 6–3, 6–3	(United Kingdom) Henry Searle	(United Kingdom) Emile Hudd (Australia) Blake Mott	(United Kingdom) Daniel Cox (United Kingdom) Paul Jubb (United Kingdom) Giles Hussey (Latvia) Robert Strombachs
April 29	Nottingham, United Kingdom; Hard; M25; Singles and doubles draws	(Australia) Joshua Charlton (United Kingdom) Emile Hudd; 6–1, 7–5	(Japan) Masamichi Imamura (Japan) Ryuki Matsuda	(United Kingdom) Emile Hudd (Australia) Blake Mott	(United Kingdom) Daniel Cox (United Kingdom) Paul Jubb (United Kingdom) Giles Hussey (Latvia) Robert Strombachs
April 29	Osijek, Croatia; Clay; M15; Singles and doubles draws	(Ukraine) Viacheslav Bielinskyi; 6–2, 6–0	(Croatia) Mili Poljičak	(Uzbekistan) Khumoyun Sultanov (Austria) Neil Oberleitner	(Croatia) Josip Šimundža (Croatia) Marino Jakić (Austria) Sebastian Sorger (Croatia) Luka Mikrut
April 29	Osijek, Croatia; Clay; M15; Singles and doubles draws	(Germany) Kai Lemstra (Italy) Filippo Romano; 7–6^{(7–3)}, 7–5	(Germany) Dominique Graf (Czech Republic) Daniel Pátý	(Uzbekistan) Khumoyun Sultanov (Austria) Neil Oberleitner	(Croatia) Josip Šimundža (Croatia) Marino Jakić (Austria) Sebastian Sorger (Croatia) Luka Mikrut
April 29	Kuršumlijska Banja, Serbia; Clay; M15; Singles and doubles draws	(France) Sascha Gueymard Wayenburg; 6–3, 7–5	(Belgium) Émilien Demanet	(Japan) Koki Matsuda (Germany) Tom Gentzsch	(Serbia) Marko Maksimović (Serbia) Branko Đurić (Germany) Liam Gavrielides (Italy) Peter Buldorini
April 29	Kuršumlijska Banja, Serbia; Clay; M15; Singles and doubles draws	(Italy) Peter Buldorini (Italy) Andrea Meduri; 6–4, 6–2	(Belgium) Émilien Demanet (Belgium) Jack Logé	(Japan) Koki Matsuda (Germany) Tom Gentzsch	(Serbia) Marko Maksimović (Serbia) Branko Đurić (Germany) Liam Gavrielides (Italy) Peter Buldorini
April 29	Monastir, Tunisia; Hard; M15; Singles and doubles draws	(United Kingdom) Stuart Parker; 7–5, 6–2	(Germany) Max Wiskandt	(South Africa) Kris van Wyk (India) Karan Singh	(France) Cyril Vandermeersch (Japan) Takuya Kumasaka (Portugal) Pedro Araújo (Japan) Jumpei Yamasaki
April 29	Monastir, Tunisia; Hard; M15; Singles and doubles draws	(Italy) Elio José Ribeiro Lago (Brazil) Paulo André Saraiava dos Santos; 6–4, 7–6^{(7–5)}	(United States) Zachary Fuchs (United States) Wally Thayne	(South Africa) Kris van Wyk (India) Karan Singh	(France) Cyril Vandermeersch (Japan) Takuya Kumasaka (Portugal) Pedro Araújo (Japan) Jumpei Yamasaki
April 29	Antalya, Turkey; Clay; M15; Singles and doubles draws	(Republic of Ireland) Michael Agwi; 6–3, 3–0, ret.	(Netherlands) Stijn Slump	(Romania) Filip Cristian Jianu (Spain) Max Alcalá Gurri	(Switzerland) Mika Brunold (Switzerland) Andrin Casanova (France) Arthur Reymond (Thailand) Wishaya Trongcharoenchaikul
April 29	Antalya, Turkey; Clay; M15; Singles and doubles draws	(Republic of Ireland) Michael Agwi (United Kingdom) Felix Mischker; 7–5, 6–7^{(4–7)}, [10–5]	(Belgium) Simon Beaupain (Czech Republic) Matěj Vocel	(Romania) Filip Cristian Jianu (Spain) Max Alcalá Gurri	(Switzerland) Mika Brunold (Switzerland) Andrin Casanova (France) Arthur Reymond (Thailand) Wishaya Trongcharoenchaikul
April 29	Orange Park, United States; Clay; M15; Singles and doubles draws	(France) Corentin Denolly; 6–3, 7–5	(Portugal) Duarte Vale	(United States) Patrick Maloney (United States) Rudy Quan	(Sweden) Arvid Nordquist (United States) Axel Nefve (United States) Cooper Woestendick (Ecuador) Andrés Andrade
April 29	Orange Park, United States; Clay; M15; Singles and doubles draws	(France) Corentin Denolly (Portugal) Duarte Vale; 4–6, 7–5, [10–8]	(United States) Sekou Bangoura (United States) Boris Kozlov	(United States) Patrick Maloney (United States) Rudy Quan	(Sweden) Arvid Nordquist (United States) Axel Nefve (United States) Cooper Woestendick (Ecuador) Andrés Andrade

=== May ===
Week of	Tournament	Winner	Runners-up	Semifinalists	Quarterfinalists
May 6	Trelew, Argentina; Hard (i); M25; Singles and doubles draws	(Japan) Kaichi Uchida; 4–6, 6–1, 6–0	(Chile) Matías Soto	(Brazil) Mateo Barreiros Reyes (Argentina) Tomás Farjat	(Chile) Daniel Antonio Núñez (Argentina) Matías Franco Descotte (Argentina) Ezequiel Monferrer (United States) Preston Brown
May 6	Trelew, Argentina; Hard (i); M25; Singles and doubles draws	(Brazil) Joaquim Almeida (Argentina) Thiago Cigarrán; 6–3, 6–1	(Argentina) Fernando Cavallo (Argentina) Manuel Mouilleron Salvo	(Brazil) Mateo Barreiros Reyes (Argentina) Tomás Farjat	(Chile) Daniel Antonio Núñez (Argentina) Matías Franco Descotte (Argentina) Ezequiel Monferrer (United States) Preston Brown
May 6	Kuršumlijska Banja, Serbia; Clay; M25; Singles and doubles draws	(Tunisia) Aziz Dougaz; 6–1, 6–1	(Serbia) Stefan Popović	(Italy) Fabrizio Andaloro (Germany) Liam Gavrielides	(Serbia) Branko Đurić (Serbia) Nikola Milojević (France) Antoine Ghibaudo (Italy) Peter Buldorini
May 6	Kuršumlijska Banja, Serbia; Clay; M25; Singles and doubles draws	(Bulgaria) Gabriel Donev (Serbia) Kristijan Juhas; 6–4, 6–2	(Serbia) Stefan Popović; Marat Sharipov	(Italy) Fabrizio Andaloro (Germany) Liam Gavrielides	(Serbia) Branko Đurić (Serbia) Nikola Milojević (France) Antoine Ghibaudo (Italy) Peter Buldorini
May 6	Valldoreix, Spain; Clay; M25; Singles and doubles draws	(Slovakia) Martin Kližan; 3–6, 6–0, 6–3	(Germany) Nicola Kuhn	(Spain) Pol Martín Tiffon (Argentina) Andrea Collarini	(Portugal) João Domingues (Italy) Gianmarco Ferrari (Spain) Miguel Damas (Spain) Daniel Mérida
May 6	Valldoreix, Spain; Clay; M25; Singles and doubles draws	(Brazil) Oscar José Gutierrez (Brazil) Gabriel Roveri Sidney; 7–5, 6–1	(Italy) Gianmarco Ferrari (Italy) Augusto Virgili	(Spain) Pol Martín Tiffon (Argentina) Andrea Collarini	(Portugal) João Domingues (Italy) Gianmarco Ferrari (Spain) Miguel Damas (Spain) Daniel Mérida
May 6	Värnamo, Sweden; Clay; M25; Singles and doubles draws	(Italy) Edoardo Lavagno; 6–2, 3–6, 6–3	(Germany) Marvin Möller	(Denmark) Philip Hjorth (Romania) Filip Cristian Jianu	(Monaco) Lucas Catarina (Italy) Giovanni Calvano (Germany) Tom Gentzsch (Norway) Viktor Durasovic
May 6	Värnamo, Sweden; Clay; M25; Singles and doubles draws	(Norway) Viktor Durasovic (Norway) Lukas Hellum Lilleengen; 7–5, 6–3	(Sweden) Henrik Bladelius (Sweden) Filip Gustafsson	(Denmark) Philip Hjorth (Romania) Filip Cristian Jianu	(Monaco) Lucas Catarina (Italy) Giovanni Calvano (Germany) Tom Gentzsch (Norway) Viktor Durasovic
May 6	Doboj, Bosnia and Herzegovina; Clay; M15; Singles and doubles draws	(France) Lilian Marmousez; 7–6^{(7–2)}, 6–4	(Croatia) Mili Poljičak	(Serbia) Dušan Obradović (Slovakia) Miloš Karol	(Croatia) Jerko Brkić (France) Axel Garcian (Bosnia and Herzegovina) Andrej Nedić (Bosnia and Herzegovina) Aldin Šetkić
May 6	Doboj, Bosnia and Herzegovina; Clay; M15; Singles and doubles draws	(Croatia) Marino Jakić (Croatia) Mili Poljičak; 6–3, 6–4	(Japan) Koki Matsuda (Japan) Yamato Sueoka	(Serbia) Dušan Obradović (Slovakia) Miloš Karol	(Croatia) Jerko Brkić (France) Axel Garcian (Bosnia and Herzegovina) Andrej Nedić (Bosnia and Herzegovina) Aldin Šetkić
May 6	Tbilisi, Georgia; Hard; M15; Singles and doubles draws	Ilia Simakin; 6–3, 6–3	Erik Arutiunian	(Czech Republic) Marek Gengel (Israel) Amit Vales	Petr Bar Biryukov; Bekhan Atlangeriev (Israel) Aaron Cohen (Israel) Orel Kimhi
May 6	Tbilisi, Georgia; Hard; M15; Singles and doubles draws	(Czech Republic) Marek Gengel (Kazakhstan) Grigoriy Lomakin; 2–6, 7–6^{(7–3)}, [10–8]	(Georgia (country)) Aleksandre Bakshi (Georgia (country)) Zura Tkemaladze	(Czech Republic) Marek Gengel (Israel) Amit Vales	Petr Bar Biryukov; Bekhan Atlangeriev (Israel) Aaron Cohen (Israel) Orel Kimhi
May 6	Villahermosa, Mexico; Hard (i); M15; Singles and doubles draws	(Mexico) Ernesto Escobedo; 6–3, 7–5	(Mexico) Rodrigo Pacheco Méndez	(Mexico) Alan Fernando Rubio Fierros (United States) Andre Ilagan	(Venezuela) Ricardo Rodríguez-Pace (Republic of Ireland) Osgar O'Hoisin (United States) Noah Schachter (United States) Nick Chappell
May 6	Villahermosa, Mexico; Hard (i); M15; Singles and doubles draws	(Antigua and Barbuda) Jody Maginley (United States) Noah Schachter; 6–4, 6–4	(Mexico) Alex Hernández (Mexico) Rodrigo Pacheco Méndez	(Mexico) Alan Fernando Rubio Fierros (United States) Andre Ilagan	(Venezuela) Ricardo Rodríguez-Pace (Republic of Ireland) Osgar O'Hoisin (United States) Noah Schachter (United States) Nick Chappell
May 6	Bucharest, Romania; Clay; M15; Singles and doubles draws	(Bulgaria) Petr Nesterov; 6–3, 4–6, 7–6^{(8–6)}	(Netherlands) Niels Lootsma	(Italy) Carlo Alberto Caniato (Romania) Sebastian Gima	(Moldova) Ilya Snițari (Argentina) Juan Bautista Otegui (Netherlands) Niels Visker (Romania) Ioan Alexandru Chiriță
May 6	Bucharest, Romania; Clay; M15; Singles and doubles draws	(Bulgaria) Petr Nesterov (Moldova) Ilya Snițari; 6–7^{(5–7)}, 6–4, [10–7]	(Argentina) Tomás Lipovšek Puches (Argentina) Juan Bautista Otegui	(Italy) Carlo Alberto Caniato (Romania) Sebastian Gima	(Moldova) Ilya Snițari (Argentina) Juan Bautista Otegui (Netherlands) Niels Visker (Romania) Ioan Alexandru Chiriță
May 6	Monastir, Tunisia; Hard; M15; Singles and doubles draws	(Germany) Max Wiskandt; 6–0, 3–0, ret.	(Ukraine) Vladyslav Orlov	(South Africa) Kris van Wyk (Italy) Leonardo Rossi	(India) Karan Singh (Japan) Takuya Kumasaka (France) Enzo Wallart (Belgium) Nicolas Ifi
May 6	Monastir, Tunisia; Hard; M15; Singles and doubles draws	Aleksandr Lobanov; Alexey Nesterov; 6–2, 6–4	(Algeria) Nazim Makhlouf (Morocco) Imran Sibille	(South Africa) Kris van Wyk (Italy) Leonardo Rossi	(India) Karan Singh (Japan) Takuya Kumasaka (France) Enzo Wallart (Belgium) Nicolas Ifi
May 6	Antalya, Turkey; Clay; M15; Singles and doubles draws	(Switzerland) Mika Brunold; 5–7, 6–4, 6–0	(Germany) Marlon Vankan	Daniil Ostapenkov (Germany) John Sperle	Teymuraz Gabashvili (Turkey) Mert Naci Türker (Switzerland) Andrin Casanova (Turkey) Koray Kırcı
May 6	Antalya, Turkey; Clay; M15; Singles and doubles draws	(China) Jin Yuquan (China) Li Zekai; 6–4, 6–4	(Turkey) Umut Akkoyun (Turkey) S Mert Özdemir	Daniil Ostapenkov (Germany) John Sperle	Teymuraz Gabashvili (Turkey) Mert Naci Türker (Switzerland) Andrin Casanova (Turkey) Koray Kırcı
May 13	Jin'an Open; Lu'an, China; Hard; M25; Singles and doubles draws	(China) Sun Fajing; 6–3, 6–1	(China) Yecong Mo	(China) Bai Yan (Japan) Takuya Kumasaka	(China) Zhou Yi (South Korea) Lee Duck-hee (China) Tang Sheng (Japan) Yuki Mochizuki
May 13	Jin'an Open; Lu'an, China; Hard; M25; Singles and doubles draws	(New Zealand) Ajeet Rai (China) Sun Fajing; 6–2, 6–2	(China) Cui Jie (South Korea) Lee Duck-hee	(China) Bai Yan (Japan) Takuya Kumasaka	(China) Zhou Yi (South Korea) Lee Duck-hee (China) Tang Sheng (Japan) Yuki Mochizuki
May 13	Kachreti, Georgia; Hard; M25; Singles and doubles draws	Evgenii Tiurnev; 3–6, 6–2, 6–2	(Israel) Yshai Oliel	(Georgia (country)) Aleksandre Bakshi (Estonia) Daniil Glinka	Evgeny Karlovskiy (Dominican Republic) Roberto Cid Subervi (United States) Ulises Blanch (Turkey) Yankı Erel
May 13	Kachreti, Georgia; Hard; M25; Singles and doubles draws	(United Kingdom) Charles Broom (United Kingdom) Hamish Stewart; 6–4, 6–4	(Uzbekistan) Denis Istomin; Evgeny Karlovskiy	(Georgia (country)) Aleksandre Bakshi (Estonia) Daniil Glinka	Evgeny Karlovskiy (Dominican Republic) Roberto Cid Subervi (United States) Ulises Blanch (Turkey) Yankı Erel
May 13	Reggio Emilia, Italy; Clay; M25; Singles and doubles draws	(Slovakia) Martin Kližan; 6–4, 6–4	(Netherlands) Jelle Sels	(Italy) Enrico Dalla Valle (Italy) Giovanni Fonio	(Italy) Giuseppe La Vela; Alexey Vatutin (Italy) Lorenzo Rottoli (Italy) Andrea Picchione
May 13	Reggio Emilia, Italy; Clay; M25; Singles and doubles draws	(United Kingdom) Jay Clarke (Germany) Kai Wehnelt; 5–7, 6–2, [10–8]	(Italy) Andrea Arnaboldi (Italy) Federico Arnaboldi	(Italy) Enrico Dalla Valle (Italy) Giovanni Fonio	(Italy) Giuseppe La Vela; Alexey Vatutin (Italy) Lorenzo Rottoli (Italy) Andrea Picchione
May 13	Vic, Spain; Clay; M25; Singles and doubles draws	(Peru) Ignacio Buse; 6–3, 6–2	(Spain) Albert Pedrico Kravtsov	(Netherlands) Michiel de Krom (Spain) Daniel Mérida	(Spain) Carlos López Montagud (Spain) Max Alcalá Gurri (Germany) Marvin Möller (Spain) Rafael Jódar
May 13	Vic, Spain; Clay; M25; Singles and doubles draws	(United Kingdom) Liam Hignett (United Kingdom) James MacKinlay; 7–5, 7–6^{(7–1)}	(Spain) Imanol López Morillo (United States) Richard Zusman	(Netherlands) Michiel de Krom (Spain) Daniel Mérida	(Spain) Carlos López Montagud (Spain) Max Alcalá Gurri (Germany) Marvin Möller (Spain) Rafael Jódar
May 13	Pensacola, United States; Clay; M25; Singles and doubles draws	(Ecuador) Andrés Andrade; 7–6^{(7–5)}, 7–5	(Lebanon) Hady Habib	(Australia) Bernard Tomic (United States) Bruno Kuzuhara	(United States) Axel Nefve (United States) Harrison Adams (United States) Nathan Ponwith (United States) Christian Langmo
May 13	Pensacola, United States; Clay; M25; Singles and doubles draws	(United States) Ty Gentry (Mexico) Daniel Moreno; 6–2, 6–4	(United States) Lucas Horve (United Kingdom) Oliver Okonkwo	(Australia) Bernard Tomic (United States) Bruno Kuzuhara	(United States) Axel Nefve (United States) Harrison Adams (United States) Nathan Ponwith (United States) Christian Langmo
May 13	Neuquén, Argentina; Clay; M15; Singles and doubles draws	(Argentina) Alejo Lorenzo Lingua Lavallén; 6–3, 7–6^{(7–2)}	(Argentina) Mariano Kestelboim	(Argentina) Thiago Cigarrán (Argentina) Guido Iván Justo	(Argentina) Leonardo Aboian (Argentina) Matías Franco Descotte (Argentina) Valentín Basel (Argentina) Juan Estévez
May 13	Neuquén, Argentina; Clay; M15; Singles and doubles draws	(Chile) Daniel Antonio Núñez (Chile) Amador Salazar; 6–2, 7–5	(Argentina) Tomás Farjat (Argentina) Alejo Lorenzo Lingua Lavallén	(Argentina) Thiago Cigarrán (Argentina) Guido Iván Justo	(Argentina) Leonardo Aboian (Argentina) Matías Franco Descotte (Argentina) Valentín Basel (Argentina) Juan Estévez
May 13	Villach, Austria; Clay; M15; Singles and doubles draws	(Germany) Justin Engel; 6–3, 3–6, 6–3	(Switzerland) Jérôme Kym	(Germany) Tom Gentzsch (Czech Republic) Daniel Pátý	(Germany) Patrick Zahraj (Italy) Luca Giacomini (Slovakia) Samuel Puškár (Slovenia) Matic Križnik
May 13	Villach, Austria; Clay; M15; Singles and doubles draws	(Austria) Nico Hipfl (Switzerland) Jérôme Kym; 6–4, 6–3	(Slovakia) Miloš Karol (Germany) Adrian Oetzbach	(Germany) Tom Gentzsch (Czech Republic) Daniel Pátý	(Germany) Patrick Zahraj (Italy) Luca Giacomini (Slovakia) Samuel Puškár (Slovenia) Matic Križnik
May 13	Prijedor, Bosnia and Herzegovina; Clay; M15; Singles and doubles draws	(Netherlands) Sander Jong; 6–1, 5–7, 6–3	(Poland) Pawel Juszczak	(Bosnia and Herzegovina) Andrej Nedić (Austria) Sebastian Sorger	(Bosnia and Herzegovina) Mirza Bašić; Denis Klok (France) Lilian Marmousez (Serbia) Saša Marković
May 13	Prijedor, Bosnia and Herzegovina; Clay; M15; Singles and doubles draws	(Netherlands) Sander Jong (Netherlands) Rik Müller; 6–3, 6–2	(Bosnia and Herzegovina) Mirza Bašić (Bosnia and Herzegovina) Vladan Tadić	(Bosnia and Herzegovina) Andrej Nedić (Austria) Sebastian Sorger	(Bosnia and Herzegovina) Mirza Bašić; Denis Klok (France) Lilian Marmousez (Serbia) Saša Marković
May 13	Addis Ababa, Ethiopia; Clay; M15; Singles and doubles draws	(Zimbabwe) Benjamin Lock; 7–6^{(7–2)}, 6–4	(Italy) Luca Fantini	(South Africa) Philip Henning (Germany) Edison Ambarzumjan	(Germany) Maik Steiner (India) Ishaque Eqbal (India) S D Prajwal Dev (Ivory Coast) Eliakim Coulibaly
May 13	Addis Ababa, Ethiopia; Clay; M15; Singles and doubles draws	(Zimbabwe) Benjamin Lock (Zimbabwe) Courtney John Lock; 6–3, 7–6^{(7–4)}	(India) Chirag Duhan (Germany) Maik Steiner	(South Africa) Philip Henning (Germany) Edison Ambarzumjan	(Germany) Maik Steiner (India) Ishaque Eqbal (India) S D Prajwal Dev (Ivory Coast) Eliakim Coulibaly
May 13	Kingston, Jamaica; Hard; M15; Singles and doubles draws	(New Zealand) Kiranpal Pannu; 6–1, 6–1	(India) Aryan Shah	(United States) Ryan Fishback (United States) Ezekiel Clark	(Venezuela) Ricardo Rodríguez-Pace (Greece) Aristotelis Thanos (Canada) Dan Martin (Jamaica) John Chin
May 13	Kingston, Jamaica; Hard; M15; Singles and doubles draws	(Antigua and Barbuda) Jody Maginley (United States) Joshua Sheehy; 4–6, 7–5, [10–2]	(Sweden) Leo Borg (India) Aryan Shah	(United States) Ryan Fishback (United States) Ezekiel Clark	(Venezuela) Ricardo Rodríguez-Pace (Greece) Aristotelis Thanos (Canada) Dan Martin (Jamaica) John Chin
May 13	Bucharest, Romania; Clay; M15; Singles and doubles draws	(Romania) Gabi Adrian Boitan; 6–7^{(5–7)}, 6–0, 6–2	(Romania) Ioan Alexandru Chiriță	(Morocco) Elliot Benchetrit (Romania) Nicholas David Ionel	(Spain) Sergi Pérez Contri (Germany) Diego Dedura-Palomero (Romania) Dan Alexandru Tomescu (Argentina) Lautaro Agustín Falabella
May 13	Bucharest, Romania; Clay; M15; Singles and doubles draws	(France) Florent Bax (Belgium) Simon Beaupain; 6–2, 6–4	(Romania) Alexandru Cristian Dumitru (Romania) Mihai Răzvan Marinescu	(Morocco) Elliot Benchetrit (Romania) Nicholas David Ionel	(Spain) Sergi Pérez Contri (Germany) Diego Dedura-Palomero (Romania) Dan Alexandru Tomescu (Argentina) Lautaro Agustín Falabella
May 13	Kuršumlijska Banja, Serbia; Clay; M15; Singles and doubles draws	(Lithuania) Edas Butvilas; 6–4, 6–0	(Australia) Matthew Dellavedova	(France) Antoine Ghibaudo (Italy) Fabrizio Andaloro	(Bulgaria) Gabriel Donev (Bulgaria) Simon Anthony Ivanov (Japan) Keisuke Saitoh (Serbia) Stefan Popović
May 13	Kuršumlijska Banja, Serbia; Clay; M15; Singles and doubles draws	(Japan) Keisuke Saitoh (Japan) Daisuke Sumizawa; 6–4, 6–0	(Bulgaria) Gabriel Donev (Bulgaria) Simon Anthony Ivanov	(France) Antoine Ghibaudo (Italy) Fabrizio Andaloro	(Bulgaria) Gabriel Donev (Bulgaria) Simon Anthony Ivanov (Japan) Keisuke Saitoh (Serbia) Stefan Popović
May 13	Kalmar, Sweden; Clay; M15; Singles and doubles draws	(France) Lucas Bouquet; 6–1, 7–5	(Finland) Eero Vasa	(Germany) Mats Rosenkranz (Austria) Jonas Trinker	(Monaco) Lucas Catarina (Switzerland) Nicolás Parizzia (France) Alexandre Aubriot (Finland) Patrick Kaukovalta
May 13	Kalmar, Sweden; Clay; M15; Singles and doubles draws	(Finland) Patrick Kaukovalta (Finland) Eero Vasa; 6–4, 6–4	(Sweden) Erik Grevelius (Sweden) Adam Heinonen	(Germany) Mats Rosenkranz (Austria) Jonas Trinker	(Monaco) Lucas Catarina (Switzerland) Nicolás Parizzia (France) Alexandre Aubriot (Finland) Patrick Kaukovalta
May 13	Monastir, Tunisia; Hard; M15; Singles and doubles draws	(France) Maxence Rivet; 6–4, 6–1	(France) Arthur Bouquier	(Italy) Leonardo Rossi (Australia) Jacob Bradshaw	(Costa Rica) Jesse Flores (France) Enzo Wallart (Germany) Max Wiskandt (Italy) Andrea Paolini
May 13	Monastir, Tunisia; Hard; M15; Singles and doubles draws	(Germany) Niklas Schell (Germany) Max Wiskandt; 7–6^{(7–4)}, 6–2	(United Kingdom) James Davis (United Kingdom) Matthew Summers	(Italy) Leonardo Rossi (Australia) Jacob Bradshaw	(Costa Rica) Jesse Flores (France) Enzo Wallart (Germany) Max Wiskandt (Italy) Andrea Paolini
May 13	Antalya, Turkey; Clay; M15; Singles and doubles draws	(Norway) Nicolai Budkov Kjær; 6–1, 6–0	(Bulgaria) Yanaki Milev	(France) Pierre Delage (Republic of Ireland) Michael Agwi	(Turkey) Gökberk Sarıtaş (Italy) Alberto Bronzetti (Italy) Giovanni Calvano (Germany) John Sperle
May 13	Antalya, Turkey; Clay; M15; Singles and doubles draws	(Italy) Federico Campana (Italy) Matteo De Vincentis; 7–6^{(7–2)}, 6–7^{(6–8)}, [11–9]	(Czech Republic) Vít Kalina (Czech Republic) Matthew William Donald	(France) Pierre Delage (Republic of Ireland) Michael Agwi	(Turkey) Gökberk Sarıtaş (Italy) Alberto Bronzetti (Italy) Giovanni Calvano (Germany) John Sperle
May 20	Kunming Open; Anning, China; Clay; M25; Singles and doubles draws	(China) Cui Jie; 6–3, 6–4	(China) Bai Yan	(Germany) Nico Hornitschek (China) Sun Fajing	(Australia) Chase Ferguson (Japan) Takuya Kumasaka (Japan) Yuki Mochizuki (Thailand) Wishaya Trongcharoenchaikul
May 20	Kunming Open; Anning, China; Clay; M25; Singles and doubles draws	(Chinese Taipei) Jeffrey Chuan En-hsu (South Korea) Shin Woo-bin; 2–6, 6–3, [10–5]	(China) Cui Jie (China) Sun Fajing	(Germany) Nico Hornitschek (China) Sun Fajing	(Australia) Chase Ferguson (Japan) Takuya Kumasaka (Japan) Yuki Mochizuki (Thailand) Wishaya Trongcharoenchaikul
May 20	Addis Ababa, Ethiopia; Clay; M25; Singles and doubles draws	(South Africa) Philip Henning; 6–2, 6–2	(India) Siddharth Vishwakarma	(Zimbabwe) Benjamin Lock (Ivory Coast) Eliakim Coulibaly	(India) Ishaque Eqbal (India) Kabir Hans (Germany) Maik Steiner (India) Adil Kalyanpur
May 20	Addis Ababa, Ethiopia; Clay; M25; Singles and doubles draws	(Zimbabwe) Benjamin Lock (Zimbabwe) Courtney John Lock; 3–6, 6–3, [10–8]	(India) S D Prajwal Dev (India) Adil Kalyanpur	(Zimbabwe) Benjamin Lock (Ivory Coast) Eliakim Coulibaly	(India) Ishaque Eqbal (India) Kabir Hans (Germany) Maik Steiner (India) Adil Kalyanpur
May 20	Deauville, France; Clay; M25; Singles and doubles draws	Alexey Vatutin; 6–3, 6–4	(Belgium) Raphaël Collignon	(France) Lucas Poullain (Netherlands) Sander Jong	(Belgium) Simon Beaupain (Ukraine) Eric Vanshelboim (France) Louis Dussin (France) Corentin Denolly
May 20	Deauville, France; Clay; M25; Singles and doubles draws	(Netherlands) Sander Jong (Netherlands) Fons van Sambeek; 6–3, 6–2	Alexey Vatutin; Alexander Zgirovsky	(France) Lucas Poullain (Netherlands) Sander Jong	(Belgium) Simon Beaupain (Ukraine) Eric Vanshelboim (France) Louis Dussin (France) Corentin Denolly
May 20	Mataró, Spain; Clay; M25; Singles and doubles draws	(Netherlands) Guy den Ouden; 6–1, 5–7, 6–0	(Italy) Lorenzo Giustino	(Peru) Ignacio Buse (Spain) Àlex Martí Pujolràs	(Germany) Nicola Kuhn (Spain) Pol Martín Tiffon (France) Laurent Lokoli (Spain) David Pérez Sanz
May 20	Mataró, Spain; Clay; M25; Singles and doubles draws	(Italy) Giorgio Ricca (Italy) Augusto Virgili; 6–3, 6–4	(Bulgaria) Anthony Genov (Spain) Bruno Pujol Navarro	(Peru) Ignacio Buse (Spain) Àlex Martí Pujolràs	(Germany) Nicola Kuhn (Spain) Pol Martín Tiffon (France) Laurent Lokoli (Spain) David Pérez Sanz
May 20	Brčko, Bosnia and Herzegovina; Clay; M15; Singles and doubles draws	(Serbia) Miljan Zekić; 2–6, 6–2, 5–1, ret.	(Poland) Paweł Juszczak	(Serbia) Saša Marković (Italy) Gabriele Bosio	(Serbia) Viktor Jović (Ukraine) Vladyslav Orlov (Serbia) Dušan Obradović (Italy) Federico Campana
May 20	Brčko, Bosnia and Herzegovina; Clay; M15; Singles and doubles draws	(Ukraine) Vladyslav Orlov (Germany) Tim Rühl; 6–2, 6–1	(United States) Kabeer Kapasi (Serbia) Miljan Zekić	(Serbia) Saša Marković (Italy) Gabriele Bosio	(Serbia) Viktor Jović (Ukraine) Vladyslav Orlov (Serbia) Dušan Obradović (Italy) Federico Campana
May 20	Bol, Croatia; Clay; M15; Singles and doubles draws	(Ukraine) Viacheslav Bielinskyi; 6–1, 6–2	(Italy) Gabriele Pennaforti	(Croatia) Mili Poljičak (Portugal) Duarte Vale	(Poland) Jasza Szajrych (Brazil) Gabriel Décamps (Austria) Sebastian Sorger (Germany) Florian Broska
May 20	Bol, Croatia; Clay; M15; Singles and doubles draws	(Croatia) Mili Poljičak (Croatia) Josip Šimundža; 6–3, 6–2	(Argentina) Nikos Lehmann (Switzerland) Nicolás Parizzia	(Croatia) Mili Poljičak (Portugal) Duarte Vale	(Poland) Jasza Szajrych (Brazil) Gabriel Décamps (Austria) Sebastian Sorger (Germany) Florian Broska
May 20	Cervia, Italy; Clay; M15; Singles and doubles draws	(Italy) Alessandro Pecci; 7–5, 4–6, 6–3	(Italy) Peter Buldorini	(Italy) Niccolò Baroni (Japan) Rei Sakamoto	(Italy) Samuele Pieri (Italy) Federico Bondioli (Italy) Luciano Carraro (Argentina) Juan Bautista Otegui
May 20	Cervia, Italy; Clay; M15; Singles and doubles draws	(Italy) Jacopo Bilardo (Italy) Gianluca Cadenasso; Walkover	(Italy) Federico Bondioli (Japan) Rei Sakamoto	(Italy) Niccolò Baroni (Japan) Rei Sakamoto	(Italy) Samuele Pieri (Italy) Federico Bondioli (Italy) Luciano Carraro (Argentina) Juan Bautista Otegui
May 20	Kingston, Jamaica; Hard; M15; Singles and doubles draws	(Sweden) Leo Borg; 3–6, 6–4, 6–4	(United States) Corey Craig	(United States) Adhithya Ganesan (New Zealand) Kiranpal Pannu	(Canada) Dan Martin (United States) Miles Jones (India) Aryan Shah (United States) Gabrielius Guzauskas
May 20	Kingston, Jamaica; Hard; M15; Singles and doubles draws	(United States) Adhithya Ganesan (India) Aryan Shah; 6–1, 6–4	(United Kingdom) Max Benaim (United Kingdom) Daniel Vishnick	(United States) Adhithya Ganesan (New Zealand) Kiranpal Pannu	(Canada) Dan Martin (United States) Miles Jones (India) Aryan Shah (United States) Gabrielius Guzauskas
May 20	Bucharest, Romania; Clay; M15; Singles and doubles draws	(Bulgaria) Pyotr Nesterov; 6–1, 6–2	(Morocco) Elliot Benchetrit	(Ukraine) Illya Beloborodko (Romania) Gabi Adrian Boitan	(Netherlands) Guy den Heijer (Spain) Mario González Fernández (Romania) Ioan Alexandru Chiriță (France) Florent Bax
May 20	Bucharest, Romania; Clay; M15; Singles and doubles draws	(Bulgaria) Pyotr Nesterov (Moldova) Ilya Snițari; 7–6^{(7–4)}, 6–2	(Italy) Simone Agostini (Italy) Matteo De Vincentis	(Ukraine) Illya Beloborodko (Romania) Gabi Adrian Boitan	(Netherlands) Guy den Heijer (Spain) Mario González Fernández (Romania) Ioan Alexandru Chiriță (France) Florent Bax
May 20	Kuršumlijska Banja, Serbia; Clay; M15; Singles and doubles draws	Marat Sharipov; 6–1, 0–6, 6–4	(Japan) Hayato Matsuoka	(Spain) Diego Augusto Barreto Sánchez (United States) Dali Blanch	(Bulgaria) Gabriel Donev (Argentina) Fermín Tenti (Senegal) Seydina André (Ukraine) Oleg Prihodko
May 20	Kuršumlijska Banja, Serbia; Clay; M15; Singles and doubles draws	(Serbia) Kristijan Juhas; Marat Sharipov; 6–4, 6–3	(Spain) Diego Augusto Barreto Sánchez (United States) Dali Blanch	(Spain) Diego Augusto Barreto Sánchez (United States) Dali Blanch	(Bulgaria) Gabriel Donev (Argentina) Fermín Tenti (Senegal) Seydina André (Ukraine) Oleg Prihodko
May 20	Celje, Slovenia; Clay; M15; Singles and doubles draws	(Brazil) João Eduardo Schiessl; 4–6, 7–6^{(7–4)}, 6–1	(Slovenia) Blaž Rola	(United Kingdom) Emile Hudd (Czech Republic) Daniel Pátý	(Czech Republic) Jiří Barnat (Poland) Karol Filar (Italy) Mariano Tammaro (Italy) Luigi Sorrentino
May 20	Celje, Slovenia; Clay; M15; Singles and doubles draws	(Italy) Filippo Romano (Germany) Kai Wehnelt; 4–6, 6–4, [10–4]	(Czech Republic) Jiří Barnat (Czech Republic) Jan Hrazdil	(United Kingdom) Emile Hudd (Czech Republic) Daniel Pátý	(Czech Republic) Jiří Barnat (Poland) Karol Filar (Italy) Mariano Tammaro (Italy) Luigi Sorrentino
May 20	Monastir, Tunisia; Hard; M15; Singles and doubles draws	(Portugal) Tiago Pereira; 7–6^{(7–1)}, 6–2	(France) Arthur Bouquier	(United Kingdom) Stuart Parker (France) Luc Fomba	(United Kingdom) William Jansen (France) Maxence Rivet (United Kingdom) Daniel Little; Mikhail Gorokhov
May 20	Monastir, Tunisia; Hard; M15; Singles and doubles draws	(Costa Rica) Jesse Flores (Italy) Elio José Ribeiro Lago; 2–6, 6–4, [13–11]	(Jordan) Mohammad Alkotop (Jordan) Mousa Alkotop	(United Kingdom) Stuart Parker (France) Luc Fomba	(United Kingdom) William Jansen (France) Maxence Rivet (United Kingdom) Daniel Little; Mikhail Gorokhov
May 27	Kiseljak, Bosnia and Herzegovina; Clay; M25; Singles and doubles draws	(Poland) Maks Kaśnikowski; 6–2, 6–2	(United Kingdom) Jay Clarke	(Brazil) Daniel Dutra da Silva; Marat Sharipov	(Australia) Matthew Dellavedova (Switzerland) Jakub Paul (Chile) Matías Soto (Turkey) Koray Kırcı
May 27	Kiseljak, Bosnia and Herzegovina; Clay; M25; Singles and doubles draws	(Japan) Rio Noguchi (Japan) Koki Matsuda; 2–6, 7–6^{(7–5)}, [11–9]	(Czech Republic) Matěj Vocel (Switzerland) Jakub Paul	(Brazil) Daniel Dutra da Silva; Marat Sharipov	(Australia) Matthew Dellavedova (Switzerland) Jakub Paul (Chile) Matías Soto (Turkey) Koray Kırcı
May 27	Baotou, China; Clay (i); M25; Singles and doubles draws	(China) Te Rigele; 6–2, 6–4	(China) Sun Fajing	(China) Mo Yecong (China) Jin Yuquan	(China) Dong Zhenxiong (Thailand) Wishaya Trongcharoenchaikul (Japan) Yuki Mochizuki (New Zealand) Ajeet Rai
May 27	Baotou, China; Clay (i); M25; Singles and doubles draws	(China) Te Rigele (United States) Evan Zhu; 6–3, 2–6, [10–6]	(China) Sun Fajing (China) Cui Jie	(China) Mo Yecong (China) Jin Yuquan	(China) Dong Zhenxiong (Thailand) Wishaya Trongcharoenchaikul (Japan) Yuki Mochizuki (New Zealand) Ajeet Rai
May 27	Carnac, France; Clay; M25; Singles and doubles draws	(Argentina) Federico Agustín Gómez; 6–4, 6–0	(France) Maxime Chazal	(Paraguay) Daniel Vallejo (France) Lucas Bouquet	(New Zealand) Alexander Klintcharov (France) Théo Papamalamis (France) Maé Malige (France) Antoine Ghibaudo
May 27	Carnac, France; Clay; M25; Singles and doubles draws	(Argentina) Federico Agustín Gómez (Paraguay) Daniel Vallejo; 6–3, 7–5	(Peru) Alexander Merino (Germany) Christoph Negritu	(Paraguay) Daniel Vallejo (France) Lucas Bouquet	(New Zealand) Alexander Klintcharov (France) Théo Papamalamis (France) Maé Malige (France) Antoine Ghibaudo
May 27	La Nucia, Spain; Clay; M25; Singles and doubles draws	(Germany) Nicola Kuhn; 7–6^{(7–3)}, 6–1	(Lithuania) Edas Butvilas	(Portugal) João Domingues (Japan) Rei Sakamoto	(Spain) Carlos Gimeno Valero (Israel) Yshai Oliel (Italy) Gianmarco Ferrari (Switzerland) Damien Wenger
May 27	La Nucia, Spain; Clay; M25; Singles and doubles draws	(India) Siddhant Banthia (Ukraine) Eric Vanshelboim; 7–5, 7–6^{(8–6)}	(Spain) Íñigo Cervantes (Spain) Sergi Pérez Contri	(Portugal) João Domingues (Japan) Rei Sakamoto	(Spain) Carlos Gimeno Valero (Israel) Yshai Oliel (Italy) Gianmarco Ferrari (Switzerland) Damien Wenger
May 27	Bol, Croatia; Clay; M15; Singles and doubles draws	(Croatia) Luka Mikrut; 6–3, 6–3	(France) Sascha Gueymard Wayenburg	(Croatia) Mili Poljičak (Ukraine) Nikita Mashtakov	(Sweden) Sebastian Eriksson (Republic of Ireland) Conor Gannon (Ukraine) Viacheslav Bielinskyi (Portugal) Duarte Vale
May 27	Bol, Croatia; Clay; M15; Singles and doubles draws	(Bosnia and Herzegovina) Mirza Bašić (Ukraine) Nikita Mashtakov; 7–5, 6–2	(Ukraine) Igor Dudun (Ukraine) Ivan Kremenchutskyi	(Croatia) Mili Poljičak (Ukraine) Nikita Mashtakov	(Sweden) Sebastian Eriksson (Republic of Ireland) Conor Gannon (Ukraine) Viacheslav Bielinskyi (Portugal) Duarte Vale
May 27	Gyula, Hungary; Clay; M15; Singles and doubles draws	(Hungary) Péter Fajta; 6–1, 6–2	(Czech Republic) Matyáš Černý	(Hungary) Gergely Madarász (Italy) Gian Marco Ortenzi	(Colombia) Daniel Salazar (Slovakia) Miloš Karol (Poland) Karol Filar (Poland) Paweł Juszczak
May 27	Gyula, Hungary; Clay; M15; Singles and doubles draws	(Slovakia) Miloš Karol (Germany) Tim Rühl; 6–0, 7–6^{(7–2)}	(Czech Republic) Matyáš Černý (Czech Republic) Filip Apltauer	(Hungary) Gergely Madarász (Italy) Gian Marco Ortenzi	(Colombia) Daniel Salazar (Slovakia) Miloš Karol (Poland) Karol Filar (Poland) Paweł Juszczak
May 27	Kingston, Jamaica; Hard; M15; Singles and doubles draws	(India) Aryan Shah; 6–2, 6–2	(Canada) Dan Martin	(Japan) Kosuke Ogura (United States) William Grant	(United States) Drew Van Orderlain (United States) Joshua Sheehy (Greece) Aristotelis Thanos (United States) Corey Craig
May 27	Kingston, Jamaica; Hard; M15; Singles and doubles draws	(Antigua and Barbuda) Jody Maginley (United States) Joshua Sheehy; 6–2, 6–3	(Ghana) Abraham Asaba (United States) Ryan Fishback	(Japan) Kosuke Ogura (United States) William Grant	(United States) Drew Van Orderlain (United States) Joshua Sheehy (Greece) Aristotelis Thanos (United States) Corey Craig
May 27	Karuizawa, Japan; Clay; M15; Singles and doubles draws	(Japan) Kaichi Uchida; 6–7^{(4–7)}, 7–5, 6–2	(Japan) Sora Fukuda	(Japan) Tomohiro Masabayashi (Japan) Yusaku Sugaya	(Japan) Ryotaro Matsumura (Japan) Masamichi Imamura (South Korea) Shin Woo-bin (Japan) Ryota Tanuma
May 27	Karuizawa, Japan; Clay; M15; Singles and doubles draws	(Japan) Yusuke Kusuhara (Japan) Shunsuke Nakagawa; 6–4, 3–6, [11–9]	(Australia) Jake Delaney (Australia) Jesse Delaney	(Japan) Tomohiro Masabayashi (Japan) Yusaku Sugaya	(Japan) Ryotaro Matsumura (Japan) Masamichi Imamura (South Korea) Shin Woo-bin (Japan) Ryota Tanuma
May 27	Constanța, Romania; Clay; M15; Singles and doubles draws	(Romania) Gabi Adrian Boitan; 6–2, 6–4	(Moldova) Ilya Snițari	(Italy) Francesco Ferrari (Romania) Nicholas David Ionel	(Romania) Vlad Andrei Dancu (Bulgaria) Pyotr Nesterov (Romania) Mihai Răzvan Marinescu (France) Florent Bax
May 27	Constanța, Romania; Clay; M15; Singles and doubles draws	(United Kingdom) Finn Bass (Romania) Bogdan Pavel; 6–1, 6–1	(Germany) Dominic Ducariu (Romania) Eric David Verdeș	(Italy) Francesco Ferrari (Romania) Nicholas David Ionel	(Romania) Vlad Andrei Dancu (Bulgaria) Pyotr Nesterov (Romania) Mihai Răzvan Marinescu (France) Florent Bax
May 27	Kuršumlijska Banja, Serbia; Clay; M15; Singles and doubles draws	(Bulgaria) Yanaki Milev; 7–6^{(7–4)}, 6–3	(Ukraine) Oleg Prihodko	(Uzbekistan) Khumoyun Sultanov; Svyatoslav Gulin	(Serbia) Viktor Jović (North Macedonia) Gorazd Srbljak (Serbia) Vuk Rađenović (Argentina) Fermín Tenti
May 27	Kuršumlijska Banja, Serbia; Clay; M15; Singles and doubles draws	(Serbia) Viktor Jović (Serbia) Kristijan Juhas; 7–5, 6–4	(Uzbekistan) Khumoyun Sultanov (Georgia (country)) Saba Purtseladze	(Uzbekistan) Khumoyun Sultanov; Svyatoslav Gulin	(Serbia) Viktor Jović (North Macedonia) Gorazd Srbljak (Serbia) Vuk Rađenović (Argentina) Fermín Tenti
May 27	Vrhnika, Slovenia; Clay; M15; Singles and doubles draws	(Brazil) João Eduardo Schiessl; 6–7^{(4–7)}, 6–0, 6–0	(Slovenia) Bor Artnak	(Italy) Luigi Sorrentino (United Kingdom) Anton Matusevich	(Germany) Kai Wehnelt (Czech Republic) Jan Hrazdil (Argentina) Mariano Kestelboim (Austria) Neil Oberleitner
May 27	Vrhnika, Slovenia; Clay; M15; Singles and doubles draws	(Germany) Kai Wehnelt (Germany) Patrick Zahraj; 6–4, 6–3	(Argentina) Mariano Kestelboim (Argentina) Ignacio Monzón	(Italy) Luigi Sorrentino (United Kingdom) Anton Matusevich	(Germany) Kai Wehnelt (Czech Republic) Jan Hrazdil (Argentina) Mariano Kestelboim (Austria) Neil Oberleitner
May 27	Monastir, Tunisia; Hard; M15; Singles and doubles draws	(Portugal) Pedro Araújo; 6–4, 6–3	Mikhail Gorokhov	(Costa Rica) Jesse Flores; Daniel Khazime	(Portugal) Diogo Marques (Morocco) Yassine Dlimi (Switzerland) Patrick Schön (Tunisia) Aziz Ouakaa
May 27	Monastir, Tunisia; Hard; M15; Singles and doubles draws	(Kazakhstan) Grigoriy Lomakin; Ilia Simakin; 6–1, 7–5	(Portugal) Pedro Araújo (Portugal) Diogo Marques	(Costa Rica) Jesse Flores; Daniel Khazime	(Portugal) Diogo Marques (Morocco) Yassine Dlimi (Switzerland) Patrick Schön (Tunisia) Aziz Ouakaa
May 27	San Diego, United States; Hard; M15; Singles and doubles draws	(United States) Learner Tien; 6–7^{(6–8)}, 6–2, 6–2	(Brazil) Karue Sell	(Luxembourg) Alex Knaff (Mexico) Alan Fernando Rubio Fierros	(United States) Nathan Ponwith (United States) Jacob Brumm (United States) Noah Zamora (Croatia) Vito Tonejc
May 27	San Diego, United States; Hard; M15; Singles and doubles draws	(United States) Sebastian Gorzny (United States) Learner Tien; 1–6, 6–3, [10–1]	(France) Robin Catry (United States) Braden Shick	(Luxembourg) Alex Knaff (Mexico) Alan Fernando Rubio Fierros	(United States) Nathan Ponwith (United States) Jacob Brumm (United States) Noah Zamora (Croatia) Vito Tonejc

=== June ===
Week of	Tournament	Winner	Runners-up	Semifinalists	Quarterfinalists
June 3	Sarajevo, Bosnia and Herzegovina; Clay; M25; Singles and doubles draws	(Bosnia and Herzegovina) Mirza Bašić; 6–1, 7–5	(Switzerland) Jakub Paul	(Serbia) Saša Marković (United Kingdom) Jay Clarke	(Turkey) Ergi Kırkın (Australia) Matthew Dellavedova (Belgium) Buvaysar Gadamauri (Germany) Adrian Oetzbach
June 3	Sarajevo, Bosnia and Herzegovina; Clay; M25; Singles and doubles draws	(Switzerland) Jakub Paul (Czech Republic) Matěj Vocel; 6–0, 6–4	(New Zealand) Finn Reynolds (Australia) Adam Taylor	(Serbia) Saša Marković (United Kingdom) Jay Clarke	(Turkey) Ergi Kırkın (Australia) Matthew Dellavedova (Belgium) Buvaysar Gadamauri (Germany) Adrian Oetzbach
June 3	Grasse, France; Clay; M25; Singles and doubles draws	(France) Maxime Chazal; 4–6, 6–4, 6–2	(Italy) Federico Gaio	(Italy) Andrea Picchione (Switzerland) Damien Wenger	Alexander Zgirovsky (France) Lucas Bouquet; Nikolay Vylegzhanin (Uruguay) Franco Roncadelli
June 3	Grasse, France; Clay; M25; Singles and doubles draws	(Argentina) Mariano Kestelboim (Uruguay) Franco Roncadelli; 6–3, 7–5	(France) Corentin Denolly (Switzerland) Damien Wenger	(Italy) Andrea Picchione (Switzerland) Damien Wenger	Alexander Zgirovsky (France) Lucas Bouquet; Nikolay Vylegzhanin (Uruguay) Franco Roncadelli
June 3	Setúbal, Portugal; Hard; M25; Singles and doubles draws	(France) Antoine Escoffier; 3–6, 7–6^{(8–6)}, 6–2	(Switzerland) Antoine Bellier	(Spain) Alberto Barroso Campos (France) Robin Bertrand	(Turkey) Altuğ Çelikbilek (Portugal) Diogo Marques (Portugal) Tiago Pereira (Israel) Orel Kimhi
June 3	Setúbal, Portugal; Hard; M25; Singles and doubles draws	(Spain) Alberto Barroso Campos (Spain) Rafael Izquierdo Luque; 6–3, 6–2	(Portugal) Francisco Rocha (Portugal) Tiago Silva	(Spain) Alberto Barroso Campos (France) Robin Bertrand	(Turkey) Altuğ Çelikbilek (Portugal) Diogo Marques (Portugal) Tiago Pereira (Israel) Orel Kimhi
June 3	Kuršumlijska Banja, Serbia; Clay; M25; Singles and doubles draws	(France) Luka Pavlovic; 6–3, 6–2	(Sweden) Adam Heinonen	(Serbia) Miljan Zekić (Georgia (country)) Saba Purtseladze	(Romania) Filip Cristian Jianu (Poland) Martyn Pawelski (Czech Republic) Dominik Kellovský (Serbia) Branko Đurić
June 3	Kuršumlijska Banja, Serbia; Clay; M25; Singles and doubles draws	(Sweden) Erik Grevelius (Sweden) Adam Heinonen; Walkover	(Serbia) Viktor Jović; Marat Sharipov	(Serbia) Miljan Zekić (Georgia (country)) Saba Purtseladze	(Romania) Filip Cristian Jianu (Poland) Martyn Pawelski (Czech Republic) Dominik Kellovský (Serbia) Branko Đurić
June 3	Córdoba, Spain; Clay; M25; Singles and doubles draws	(Germany) Nicola Kuhn; 7–6^{(7–3)}, 6–3	(Spain) Pedro Vives Marcos	(Spain) Àlex Martí Pujolràs (Spain) Pol Martín Tiffon	(Italy) Raúl Brancaccio (Netherlands) Ryan Nijboer (Italy) Andrea Guerrieri (Bulgaria) Iliyan Radulov
June 3	Córdoba, Spain; Clay; M25; Singles and doubles draws	(Australia) Blake Bayldon (Netherlands) Mats Hermans; 7–6^{(7–3)}, 6–3	(India) Siddhant Banthia (United States) Tennyson Whiting	(Spain) Àlex Martí Pujolràs (Spain) Pol Martín Tiffon	(Italy) Raúl Brancaccio (Netherlands) Ryan Nijboer (Italy) Andrea Guerrieri (Bulgaria) Iliyan Radulov
June 3	Santo Domingo, Dominican Republic; Hard; M15; Singles and doubles draws	(Canada) Taha Baadi; 7–5, 6–4	(Dominican Republic) Peter Bertran	(United States) Mwendwa Mbithi (Sweden) Arvid Nordquist	(Dominican Republic) Roberto Cid Subervi (United States) Ryan Fishback (Australia) Oliver Anderson (United States) Miles Jones
June 3	Santo Domingo, Dominican Republic; Hard; M15; Singles and doubles draws	(United States) Cassius Chinlund (United States) Andrew Delgado; 3–6, 7–6^{(7–4)}, [11–9]	(Brazil) Lucca C. Pignaton (Italy) Lorenzo Claverie	(United States) Mwendwa Mbithi (Sweden) Arvid Nordquist	(Dominican Republic) Roberto Cid Subervi (United States) Ryan Fishback (Australia) Oliver Anderson (United States) Miles Jones
June 3	Harmon, Guam; Hard; M15; Singles and doubles draws	(Australia) Jake Delaney; 6–7^{(4–7)}, 7–5, 6–3	(Japan) Ryuki Matsuda	(Japan) Sora Fukuda (Japan) Kokoro Isomura	(Japan) Tomohiro Masabayashi (Japan) Naoki Tajima (Australia) Jesse Delaney (Japan) Kenta Miyoshi
June 3	Harmon, Guam; Hard; M15; Singles and doubles draws	(Japan) Kazuma Kawachi (Japan) Ryuki Matsuda; 6–1, 6–3	(Japan) Tatsuma Ito (Japan) Yuhei Kono	(Japan) Sora Fukuda (Japan) Kokoro Isomura	(Japan) Tomohiro Masabayashi (Japan) Naoki Tajima (Australia) Jesse Delaney (Japan) Kenta Miyoshi
June 3	Caltanissetta, Italy; Clay; M15; Singles and doubles draws	(France) Lilian Marmousez; 6–4, 6–2	(Italy) Gianmarco Ferrari	(Italy) Alessandro Coccioli (Italy) Luca Potenza	(Italy) Salvatore Caruso (Italy) Antonio Caruso (Italy) Gian Matias Di Natale (Italy) Gabriele Piraino
June 3	Caltanissetta, Italy; Clay; M15; Singles and doubles draws	(Italy) Andrea Bacaloni (Italy) Andrea Gola; 7–6^{(8–6)}, 7–6^{(7–4)}	(Italy) Antonio Caruso (Italy) Pietro Marino	(Italy) Alessandro Coccioli (Italy) Luca Potenza	(Italy) Salvatore Caruso (Italy) Antonio Caruso (Italy) Gian Matias Di Natale (Italy) Gabriele Piraino
June 3	Grodzisk Mazowiecki, Poland; Clay; M15; Singles and doubles draws	(Ukraine) Oleg Prihodko; 6–2, 6–4	(Argentina) Ignacio Monzón	(Ukraine) Vladyslav Orlov (Poland) Paweł Juszczak	(Germany) Maik Steiner (Poland) Szymon Kielan (Poland) Piotr Siekanowicz (Poland) Filip Pieczonka
June 3	Grodzisk Mazowiecki, Poland; Clay; M15; Singles and doubles draws	(Ukraine) Vladyslav Orlov (Czech Republic) Daniel Pátý; 6–0, 7–6^{(7–1)}	(Poland) Adam Bajurko (Poland) Paweł Juszczak	(Ukraine) Vladyslav Orlov (Poland) Paweł Juszczak	(Germany) Maik Steiner (Poland) Szymon Kielan (Poland) Piotr Siekanowicz (Poland) Filip Pieczonka
June 3	Daegu, South Korea; Hard; M15; Singles and doubles draws	(Australia) Edward Winter; 6–3, 3–6, 7–5	(United States) Ezekiel Clark	(Latvia) Kārlis Ozoliņš (South Korea) Lee Duck-hee	(Japan) Kaichi Uchida (South Korea) Lee Jea-moon (South Korea) Lee Jeong-heon (South Korea) Oh Chan-yeong
June 3	Daegu, South Korea; Hard; M15; Singles and doubles draws	(South Korea) Lee Jea-moon (South Korea) Song Min-kyu; 6–1, 6–1	(South Korea) Kwon Soon-woo (South Korea) Park Seung-min	(Latvia) Kārlis Ozoliņš (South Korea) Lee Duck-hee	(Japan) Kaichi Uchida (South Korea) Lee Jea-moon (South Korea) Lee Jeong-heon (South Korea) Oh Chan-yeong
June 3	Hrastnik, Slovenia; Clay; M15; Singles and doubles draws	(Germany) Luca Wiedenmann; 6–4, 1–6, 6–4	(Switzerland) Mika Brunold	(Slovenia) Bor Artnak (Austria) Sebastian Sorger	(Netherlands) Alec Deckers (Italy) Lorenzo Rottoli (Italy) Luca Castagnola (Austria) Gregor Ramskogler
June 3	Hrastnik, Slovenia; Clay; M15; Singles and doubles draws	(Slovenia) Nik Razboršek (Slovenia) Žiga Šeško; 7–6^{(7–4)}, 6–4	(Croatia) Nikola Bašić (Slovenia) Jan Kupčič	(Slovenia) Bor Artnak (Austria) Sebastian Sorger	(Netherlands) Alec Deckers (Italy) Lorenzo Rottoli (Italy) Luca Castagnola (Austria) Gregor Ramskogler
June 3	Monastir, Tunisia; Hard; M15; Singles and doubles draws	(Turkey) Cengiz Aksu; 6–3, 6–2	Mikhail Gorokhov	(New Zealand) Jack Loutit (India) Manish Sureshkumar	(United Kingdom) Marcus Walters (France) Louis Tessa (Kazakhstan) Grigoriy Lomakin (Belgium) Nicolas Ifi
June 3	Monastir, Tunisia; Hard; M15; Singles and doubles draws	(Kazakhstan) Grigoriy Lomakin (Brazil) Paulo André Saraiva dos Santos; 4–6, 6–2, [10–8]	(Germany) Niklas Schell (United Kingdom) Marcus Walters	(New Zealand) Jack Loutit (India) Manish Sureshkumar	(United Kingdom) Marcus Walters (France) Louis Tessa (Kazakhstan) Grigoriy Lomakin (Belgium) Nicolas Ifi
June 3	San Diego, United States; Hard; M15; Singles and doubles draws	(United States) Learner Tien; 6–4, 6–7^{(5–7)}, 6–4	(United States) Alafia Ayeni	(United States) Noah Schachter (Mexico) Alan Fernando Rubio Fierros	(New Zealand) Isaac Becroft (Luxembourg) Alex Knaff (United States) Collin Altamirano (Australia) Joshua Charlton
June 3	San Diego, United States; Hard; M15; Singles and doubles draws	(United States) Jacob Bullard (United States) Maxwell McKennon; 6–2, 6–3	(Australia) Jeremy Jin (United Kingdom) Lui Maxted	(United States) Noah Schachter (Mexico) Alan Fernando Rubio Fierros	(New Zealand) Isaac Becroft (Luxembourg) Alex Knaff (United States) Collin Altamirano (Australia) Joshua Charlton
June 10	Aarhus, Denmark; Clay; M25; Singles and doubles draws	(Denmark) Elmer Møller; 6–3, 6–0	(Denmark) August Holmgren	(United Kingdom) Toby Martin (Germany) Lucas Gerch	(Ukraine) Eric Vanshelboim (Germany) Adrian Oetzbach (Belgium) Buvaysar Gadamauri (Sweden) Adam Heinonen
June 10	Aarhus, Denmark; Clay; M25; Singles and doubles draws	(Denmark) Carl Emil Overbeck (Denmark) Oskar Brostrøm Poulsen; 6–4, 3–6, [10–5]	(Denmark) August Holmgren (Denmark) Christian Sigsgaard	(United Kingdom) Toby Martin (Germany) Lucas Gerch	(Ukraine) Eric Vanshelboim (Germany) Adrian Oetzbach (Belgium) Buvaysar Gadamauri (Sweden) Adam Heinonen
June 10	Villeneuve-Loubet, France; Clay; M25+H; Singles and doubles draws	(Switzerland) Rémy Bertola; 3–6, 6–4, 6–3	(Israel) Yshai Oliel	Alexey Vatutin (France) Corentin Denolly	(France) Timo Legout (Egypt) Mohamed Safwat (France) Evan Furness (France) Laurent Lokoli
June 10	Villeneuve-Loubet, France; Clay; M25+H; Singles and doubles draws	(Switzerland) Rémy Bertola (Switzerland) Jakub Paul; 3–6, 7–6^{(7–3)}, [14–12]	(France) Dan Added (France) Arthur Reymond	Alexey Vatutin (France) Corentin Denolly	(France) Timo Legout (Egypt) Mohamed Safwat (France) Evan Furness (France) Laurent Lokoli
June 10	Rabat, Morocco; Clay; M25; Singles and doubles draws	(Spain) Max Alcalá Gurri; 6–2, 6–3	(Spain) Carlos López Montagud	(Belgium) Tibo Colson (Spain) Àlex Martí Pujolràs	(France) Maxence Bertimon (Lithuania) Edas Butvilas (France) Constantin Bittoun Kouzmine (Morocco) Elliot Benchetrit
June 10	Rabat, Morocco; Clay; M25; Singles and doubles draws	(France) Maxence Bertimon (Morocco) Younes Lalami Laaroussi; 6–3, 6–2	(Morocco) Mehdi Benchakroun (Morocco) Yassine Dlimi	(Belgium) Tibo Colson (Spain) Àlex Martí Pujolràs	(France) Maxence Bertimon (Lithuania) Edas Butvilas (France) Constantin Bittoun Kouzmine (Morocco) Elliot Benchetrit
June 10	Elvas, Portugal; Hard; M25; Singles and doubles draws	(France) Antoine Escoffier; 6–3, 6–2	(Portugal) Duarte Vale	(Turkey) Altuğ Çelikbilek (Czech Republic) Marek Gengel	(Israel) Orel Kimhi (Portugal) Tiago Pereira (Portugal) Frederico Ferreira Silva (France) Jules Marie
June 10	Elvas, Portugal; Hard; M25; Singles and doubles draws	(Portugal) Illia Stoliar (Portugal) João Graça; 6–4, 6–4	(Portugal) Pedro Araújo (Portugal) João Domingues	(Turkey) Altuğ Çelikbilek (Czech Republic) Marek Gengel	(Israel) Orel Kimhi (Portugal) Tiago Pereira (Portugal) Frederico Ferreira Silva (France) Jules Marie
June 10	Martos, Spain; Hard; M25; Singles and doubles draws	(Belgium) Michael Geerts; 6–4, ret.	(France) Arthur Bouquier	(Spain) Miguel Damas (Spain) Pedro Vives Marcos	(France) Robin Bertrand (Spain) Alberto Barroso Campos (Spain) Alejo Sánchez Quílez (Italy) Andrea Guerrieri
June 10	Martos, Spain; Hard; M25; Singles and doubles draws	(France) Robin Bertrand (France) Arthur Bouquier; 6–3, 7–5	(Ecuador) Patricio Alvarado (Spain) Iván Marrero Curbelo	(Spain) Miguel Damas (Spain) Pedro Vives Marcos	(France) Robin Bertrand (Spain) Alberto Barroso Campos (Spain) Alejo Sánchez Quílez (Italy) Andrea Guerrieri
June 10	Wichita, United States; Hard; M25; Singles and doubles draws	(United States) Micah Braswell; 6–4, 6–3	(United States) Eliot Spizzirri	(United States) Sebastian Gorzny (United States) Ethan Quinn	(United Kingdom) Lui Maxted (Canada) Liam Draxl (Poland) Filip Peliwo (United States) Alexander Kotzen
June 10	Wichita, United States; Hard; M25; Singles and doubles draws	(United States) Pranav Kumar (United States) Joshua Sheehy; 6–7^{(4–7)}, 6–3, 10–8	(Canada) Cleeve Harper (United States) Eliot Spizzirri	(United States) Sebastian Gorzny (United States) Ethan Quinn	(United Kingdom) Lui Maxted (Canada) Liam Draxl (Poland) Filip Peliwo (United States) Alexander Kotzen
June 10	Santo Domingo, Dominican Republic; Hard; M15; Singles and doubles draws	(New Zealand) Kiranpal Pannu; 6–4, 5–7, 7–6^{(7–2)}	(China) Fnu Nidunjianzan	(Canada) Juan Carlos Aguilar (Dominican Republic) Peter Bertran	(Sweden) Arvid Nordquist (Italy) Lorenzo Claverie (Colombia) Johan Alexander Rodríguez (United States) Adit Sinha
June 10	Santo Domingo, Dominican Republic; Hard; M15; Singles and doubles draws	(United States) Keshav Chopra (United States) Adam Neff; 4–6, 6–3, [10–4]	(Canada) Juan Carlos Aguilar (Canada) Nicaise Muamba	(Canada) Juan Carlos Aguilar (Dominican Republic) Peter Bertran	(Sweden) Arvid Nordquist (Italy) Lorenzo Claverie (Colombia) Johan Alexander Rodríguez (United States) Adit Sinha
June 10	Hong Kong, Hong Kong; Hard; M15; Singles and doubles draws	Evgenii Tiurnev; 6–4, 6–2	(New Zealand) Ajeet Rai	(Japan) Taiyo Yamanaka (India) S D Prajwal Dev	(Japan) Ryotaro Taguchi (United Kingdom) William Jansen (Japan) Ryota Tanuma (Japan) Tomohiro Masabayashi
June 10	Hong Kong, Hong Kong; Hard; M15; Singles and doubles draws	(Japan) Tomohiro Masabayashi (Thailand) Thantub Suksumrarn; 6–3, 7–5	(New Zealand) Ajeet Rai (India) Rishi Reddy	(Japan) Taiyo Yamanaka (India) S D Prajwal Dev	(Japan) Ryotaro Taguchi (United Kingdom) William Jansen (Japan) Ryota Tanuma (Japan) Tomohiro Masabayashi
June 10	Nyíregyháza, Hungary; Clay; M15; Singles and doubles draws	(Uruguay) Franco Roncadelli; 6–2, 1–6, 7–5	(Czech Republic) Dominik Kellovský	(Italy) Gianluca Cadenasso (Hungary) Péter Fajta	(Finland) Eero Vasa (Italy) Gabriele Bosio (Argentina) Juan Estévez; Aleksander Chayka
June 10	Nyíregyháza, Hungary; Clay; M15; Singles and doubles draws	(Finland) Eero Vasa (Finland) Iiro Vasa; 2–6, 6–2, [10–3]	(Netherlands) Abel Forger (Netherlands) Thijmen Loof	(Italy) Gianluca Cadenasso (Hungary) Péter Fajta	(Finland) Eero Vasa (Italy) Gabriele Bosio (Argentina) Juan Estévez; Aleksander Chayka
June 10	Chieti, Italy; Clay; M15; Singles and doubles draws	(Ukraine) Oleksandr Ovcharenko; Walkover	(France) Lilian Marmousez	(Italy) Michele Ribecai (Italy) Gabriele Maria Noce	(Italy) Samuele Pieri (Italy) Gabriele Vulpitta (Italy) Luigi Sorrentino (Italy) Francesco Forti
June 10	Chieti, Italy; Clay; M15; Singles and doubles draws	(Italy) Lorenzo Rottoli (Italy) Luigi Sorrentino; 6–3, 7–6^{(7–4)}	(Italy) Giorgio Ricca (Italy) Augusto Virgili	(Italy) Michele Ribecai (Italy) Gabriele Maria Noce	(Italy) Samuele Pieri (Italy) Gabriele Vulpitta (Italy) Luigi Sorrentino (Italy) Francesco Forti
June 10	Koszalin, Poland; Clay; M15; Singles and doubles draws	(Ukraine) Viacheslav Bielinskyi; 7–6^{(7–3)}, 6–2	(Poland) Paweł Juszczak	(Georgia (country)) Zura Tkemaladze (Austria) Sebastian Sorger	(Germany) Patrick Zahraj (Switzerland) Tanguy Genier (Italy) Daniele Rapagnetta (Netherlands) Daniel de Jonge
June 10	Koszalin, Poland; Clay; M15; Singles and doubles draws	(Switzerland) Luca Stäheli (Switzerland) Timofey Stepanov; 6–3, 6–2	(Czech Republic) Štěpán Baum (Czech Republic) Daniel Pátý	(Georgia (country)) Zura Tkemaladze (Austria) Sebastian Sorger	(Germany) Patrick Zahraj (Switzerland) Tanguy Genier (Italy) Daniele Rapagnetta (Netherlands) Daniel de Jonge
June 10	Oradea, Romania; Clay; M15; Singles and doubles draws	(Romania) Cezar Creţu; 7–6^{(7–4)}, 6–4	(Romania) Gabi Adrian Boitan	(Romania) Ștefan Paloși (Romania) Nicholas David Ionel	(Germany) Maik Steiner (Romania) Vlad Andrei Dancu (Netherlands) Michiel de Krom (Romania) Dan Alexandru Tomescu
June 10	Oradea, Romania; Clay; M15; Singles and doubles draws	(United Kingdom) Finn Bass (Romania) Bogdan Pavel; 7–5, 6–3	(Spain) Mateo Luis Álvarez Sarmiento (Latvia) Mārtiņš Rocēns	(Romania) Ștefan Paloși (Romania) Nicholas David Ionel	(Germany) Maik Steiner (Romania) Vlad Andrei Dancu (Netherlands) Michiel de Krom (Romania) Dan Alexandru Tomescu
June 10	Kuršumlijska Banja, Serbia; Clay; M15; Singles and doubles draws	(Montenegro) Petar Jovanović; 6–4, 2–0, ret.	(France) Luka Pavlovic	(Serbia) Dušan Obradović; Marat Sharipov	Savva Polukhin (France) Sascha Gueymard Wayenburg (Bulgaria) Dinko Dinev (Germany) Benito Sanchez Martinez
June 10	Kuršumlijska Banja, Serbia; Clay; M15; Singles and doubles draws	(Serbia) Kristijan Juhas; Marat Sharipov; 2–6, 6–2, [10–1]	(Serbia) Stefan Latinović (France) Luka Pavlovic	(Serbia) Dušan Obradović; Marat Sharipov	Savva Polukhin (France) Sascha Gueymard Wayenburg (Bulgaria) Dinko Dinev (Germany) Benito Sanchez Martinez
June 10	Anseong, South Korea; Hard; M15; Singles and doubles draws	(Latvia) Kārlis Ozoliņš; 7–6^{(7–4)}, 6–0	(South Korea) Shin San-hui	(South Korea) Jang Yun-seok (Australia) Chase Ferguson	(Japan) Kenta Miyoshi (Japan) Kokoro Isomura (Japan) Masamichi Imamura (South Korea) Shin Woo-bin
June 10	Anseong, South Korea; Hard; M15; Singles and doubles draws	(Japan) Kenta Miyoshi (Australia) Edward Winter; 6–3, 5–7, [10–6]	(Australia) Ethan Cook (Japan) Naoki Tajima	(South Korea) Jang Yun-seok (Australia) Chase Ferguson	(Japan) Kenta Miyoshi (Japan) Kokoro Isomura (Japan) Masamichi Imamura (South Korea) Shin Woo-bin
June 10	Monastir, Tunisia; Hard; M15; Singles and doubles draws	(South Africa) Kris van Wyk; 6–1, 7–5	Egor Agafonov	(India) Manish Sureshkumar (France) Etienne Donnet	(Brazil) Paulo André Saraiva dos Santos (France) Alexandre Reco (Brazil) Natan Rodrigues (United Kingdom) Peter Alam
June 10	Monastir, Tunisia; Hard; M15; Singles and doubles draws	Egor Agafonov (Kazakhstan) Grigoriy Lomakin; 6–3, 6–3	(Brazil) Paulo André Saraiva dos Santos (South Africa) Kris van Wyk	(India) Manish Sureshkumar (France) Etienne Donnet	(Brazil) Paulo André Saraiva dos Santos (France) Alexandre Reco (Brazil) Natan Rodrigues (United Kingdom) Peter Alam
June 10	San Diego, United States; Hard; M15; Singles and doubles draws	(United Kingdom) Oliver Tarvet; 4–6, 6–3, 6–4	(United States) Nathan Ponwith	(United States) Patrick Maloney (United States) Strong Kirchheimer	(Australia) Derek Pham (United States) Alafia Ayeni (Japan) Jay Dylan Hara Friend (United States) Collin Altamirano
June 10	San Diego, United States; Hard; M15; Singles and doubles draws	(United States) Nathan Ponwith (United States) James Tracy; 7–6^{(7–2)}, 6–2	(Estonia) Johannes Seeman (United States) Wally Thayne	(United States) Patrick Maloney (United States) Strong Kirchheimer	(Australia) Derek Pham (United States) Alafia Ayeni (Japan) Jay Dylan Hara Friend (United States) Collin Altamirano
June 17	Duffel, Belgium; Clay; M25; Singles and doubles draws	(Austria) Sandro Kopp; 6–4, 6–3	(Uzbekistan) Khumoyun Sultanov	(Belgium) Gauthier Onclin (Finland) Eero Vasa	(Netherlands) Max Houkes (Germany) Marlon Vankan (France) Raphaël Pérot (Belgium) Gilles-Arnaud Bailly
June 17	Duffel, Belgium; Clay; M25; Singles and doubles draws	(Austria) Sandro Kopp (Germany) Kai Wehnelt; 6–3, 6–3	(Germany) Marcel Hornung (United States) Lucas Hammond	(Belgium) Gauthier Onclin (Finland) Eero Vasa	(Netherlands) Max Houkes (Germany) Marlon Vankan (France) Raphaël Pérot (Belgium) Gilles-Arnaud Bailly
June 17	Luzhou, China; Hard; M25; Singles and doubles draws	(China) Bai Yan; 7–6^{(7–4)}, 7–6^{(8–6)}	(China) Zhou Yi	(China) Lu Pengyu (China) Wang Aoran	(China) Zhang Yu (China) Sun Qian (China) Yu Bingyu (China) Tang Sheng
June 17	Luzhou, China; Hard; M25; Singles and doubles draws	(China) Tang Sheng (China) Zheng Zhan; 3–6, 6–3, [13–11]	(Chinese Taipei) Ray Ho (China) Yu Bingyu	(China) Lu Pengyu (China) Wang Aoran	(China) Zhang Yu (China) Sun Qian (China) Yu Bingyu (China) Tang Sheng
June 17	Montauban, France; Clay; M25; Singles and doubles draws	(France) Maxime Chazal; 6–4, 6–2	(France) Arthur Reymond	(France) Benjamin Pietri (Switzerland) Johan Nikles	(France) Leo Raquillet (France) Dan Added (France) Laurent Lokoli (France) Thomas Gerbaud
June 17	Montauban, France; Clay; M25; Singles and doubles draws	(Switzerland) Johan Nikles (Switzerland) Damien Wenger; 7–6^{(7–1)}, 7–6^{(7–3)}	(France) Dan Added (France) Arthur Reymond	(France) Benjamin Pietri (Switzerland) Johan Nikles	(France) Leo Raquillet (France) Dan Added (France) Laurent Lokoli (France) Thomas Gerbaud
June 17	Cattolica, Italy; Clay; M25; Singles and doubles draws	(Italy) Giovanni Oradini; 7–6^{(7–4)}, 3–6, 7–5	(Italy) Andrea Picchione	(Italy) Gabriele Pennaforti (Spain) Carlos López Montagud	(Italy) Alessandro Pecci (Italy) Stefano D'Agostino (Germany) Tim Handel (Bulgaria) Yanaki Milev
June 17	Cattolica, Italy; Clay; M25; Singles and doubles draws	(Italy) Francesco Forti (Italy) Andrea Picchione; 7–6^{(7–2)}, 6–3	(Italy) Pietro Pampanin (Brazil) João Eduardo Schiessl	(Italy) Gabriele Pennaforti (Spain) Carlos López Montagud	(Italy) Alessandro Pecci (Italy) Stefano D'Agostino (Germany) Tim Handel (Bulgaria) Yanaki Milev
June 17	Changwon, South Korea; Hard; M25; Singles and doubles draws	(Japan) Kaichi Uchida; 6–2, 5–7, 6–3	(Japan) Masamichi Imamura	(Japan) Naoki Nakagawa (Australia) Edward Winter	(South Korea) Oh Chan-yeong (South Korea) Shin San-hui (Japan) Kenta Miyoshi (South Korea) Jeong Yeong-seok
June 17	Changwon, South Korea; Hard; M25; Singles and doubles draws	(South Korea) Chung Hong (South Korea) Son Ji-hoon; 7–5, 4–6, [11–9]	(Japan) Masamichi Imamura (South Korea) Shin Woo-bin	(Japan) Naoki Nakagawa (Australia) Edward Winter	(South Korea) Oh Chan-yeong (South Korea) Shin San-hui (Japan) Kenta Miyoshi (South Korea) Jeong Yeong-seok
June 17	Mungia-Laukariz, Spain; Clay (i); M25; Singles and doubles draws	(Netherlands) Michiel de Krom; 6–4, 6–4	(Netherlands) Ryan Nijboer	(Spain) Alberto Barroso Campos (Portugal) Frederico Ferreira Silva	(Spain) Benjamín Winter López (Ukraine) Eric Vanshelboim (Bulgaria) Iliyan Radulov; Svyatoslav Gulin
June 17	Mungia-Laukariz, Spain; Clay (i); M25; Singles and doubles draws	(Netherlands) Michiel de Krom (Netherlands) Ryan Nijboer; 7–6^{(7–0)}, 2–6, [10–7]	(Spain) Alejandro García (Spain) Mario Mansilla Díez	(Spain) Alberto Barroso Campos (Portugal) Frederico Ferreira Silva	(Spain) Benjamín Winter López (Ukraine) Eric Vanshelboim (Bulgaria) Iliyan Radulov; Svyatoslav Gulin
June 17	Tulsa, United States; Hard; M25; Singles and doubles draws	(United States) Eliot Spizzirri; 6–4, 3–6, 7–6^{(7–3)}	(Australia) Bernard Tomic	(United States) Nicolas Ian Kotzen (United States) Alexander Kotzen	(United States) Mitchell Krueger (United States) Micah Braswell (United States) Andre Ilagan (United States) Govind Nanda
June 17	Tulsa, United States; Hard; M25; Singles and doubles draws	(United States) Aidan Kim (United States) Cannon Kingsley; 6–3, 5–7, [10–7]	(Canada) Cleeve Harper (United States) Govind Nanda	(United States) Nicolas Ian Kotzen (United States) Alexander Kotzen	(United States) Mitchell Krueger (United States) Micah Braswell (United States) Andre Ilagan (United States) Govind Nanda
June 17	Saarlouis, Germany; Clay; M15; Singles and doubles draws	(Czech Republic) Michael Vrbenský; 6–3, 7–6^{(7–3)}	(Germany) Lucas Gerch	(Netherlands) Niels Visker (Germany) Mika Lipp	(Germany) Luca Wiedenmann; Bogdan Bobrov (Uzbekistan) Sergey Fomin (Germany) Liam Gavrielides
June 17	Saarlouis, Germany; Clay; M15; Singles and doubles draws	(Netherlands) Sidané Pontjodikromo (Netherlands) Niels Visker; 4–6, 6–0, [10–7]	(Germany) Lars Johann (Germany) Milan Welte	(Netherlands) Niels Visker (Germany) Mika Lipp	(Germany) Luca Wiedenmann; Bogdan Bobrov (Uzbekistan) Sergey Fomin (Germany) Liam Gavrielides
June 17	Hong Kong, Hong Kong; Hard; M15; Singles and doubles draws	(Japan) Shintaro Imai; 6–4, 6–4	(Australia) Jake Delaney	(Japan) Tomohiro Masabayashi (Thailand) Thanapet Chanta	(Hong Kong) Jack Cheng (New Zealand) Ajeet Rai (Thailand) Kasidit Samrej (India) S D Prajwal Dev
June 17	Hong Kong, Hong Kong; Hard; M15; Singles and doubles draws	(Thailand) Siwanat Auytayakul (Thailand) Kasidit Samrej; 6–4, 3–6, [10–6]	(Japan) Yuichiro Inui (Japan) Kazuki Nishiwaki	(Japan) Tomohiro Masabayashi (Thailand) Thanapet Chanta	(Hong Kong) Jack Cheng (New Zealand) Ajeet Rai (Thailand) Kasidit Samrej (India) S D Prajwal Dev
June 17	Nyíregyháza, Hungary; Clay; M15; Singles and doubles draws	(Uruguay) Franco Roncadelli; 7–6^{(7–3)}, 6–1	(Romania) Dan Alexandru Tomescu	(Hungary) Gábor Hornung (Slovakia) Lukáš Pokorný	(Slovakia) Tomáš Lánik (Czech Republic) Dominik Kellovský (Hungary) Péter Fajta (Hungary) Attila Boros
June 17	Nyíregyháza, Hungary; Clay; M15; Singles and doubles draws	(Slovakia) Miloš Karol (United Kingdom) Michael Shaw; 6–3, 6–3	(Hungary) Attila Boros (Hungary) Botond Kisantal	(Hungary) Gábor Hornung (Slovakia) Lukáš Pokorný	(Slovakia) Tomáš Lánik (Czech Republic) Dominik Kellovský (Hungary) Péter Fajta (Hungary) Attila Boros
June 17	Casablanca, Morocco; Clay; M15; Singles and doubles draws	(Netherlands) Stijn Slump; 6–3, 7–6^{(7–3)}	(Spain) Mario González Fernández	(Morocco) Yassine Dlimi (Morocco) Karim Bennani	(France) Constantin Bittoun Kouzmine (Morocco) Reda Bennani (Argentina) Matías Franco Descotte (Spain) Àlex Martí Pujolràs
June 17	Casablanca, Morocco; Clay; M15; Singles and doubles draws	(Japan) Hayato Matsuoka (Germany) Lasse Pörtner; 6–7^{(8–10)}, 6–2, [10–8]	(Morocco) Mehdi Benchakroun (Morocco) Yassine Dlimi	(Morocco) Yassine Dlimi (Morocco) Karim Bennani	(France) Constantin Bittoun Kouzmine (Morocco) Reda Bennani (Argentina) Matías Franco Descotte (Spain) Àlex Martí Pujolràs
June 17	Koszalin, Poland; Clay; M15; Singles and doubles draws	(Sweden) John Hallquist Lithen; 6–7^{(0–7)}, 7–5, 6–0	(Switzerland) Luca Stäheli	(Italy) Daniele Rapagnetta (Poland) Paweł Juszczak	(Poland) Alan Bojarski (Germany) Tim Rühl (Austria) Sebastian Sorger (Germany) Max Wiskandt
June 17	Koszalin, Poland; Clay; M15; Singles and doubles draws	(Sweden) Henrik Bladelius (Sweden) Jack Karlsson Wistrand; 6–4, 6–3	(Poland) Paweł Juszczak (Poland) Bruno Kokot	(Italy) Daniele Rapagnetta (Poland) Paweł Juszczak	(Poland) Alan Bojarski (Germany) Tim Rühl (Austria) Sebastian Sorger (Germany) Max Wiskandt
June 17	Cluj-Napoca, Romania; Clay; M15; Singles and doubles draws	(Romania) Bogdan Pavel; 6–3, 2–6, 6–3	(Italy) Mariano Tammaro	(Romania) Radu Mihai Papoe (Romania) Ioan Alexandru Chiriţă	(Czech Republic) Filip Apltauer (Italy) Massimo Giunta (Argentina) Juan Pablo Paz (Romania) Cezar Gabriel Papoe
June 17	Cluj-Napoca, Romania; Clay; M15; Singles and doubles draws	(Argentina) Tomás Lipovšek Puches (Argentina) Juan Pablo Paz; Walkover	(Romania) Ștefan Paloși (Romania) Radu Mihai Papoe	(Romania) Radu Mihai Papoe (Romania) Ioan Alexandru Chiriţă	(Czech Republic) Filip Apltauer (Italy) Massimo Giunta (Argentina) Juan Pablo Paz (Romania) Cezar Gabriel Papoe
June 17	Kuršumlijska Banja, Serbia; Clay; M15; Singles and doubles draws	(Italy) Tommaso Compagnucci; 6–4, 6–4	(Bosnia and Herzegovina) Andrej Nedić	(Bulgaria) Simon Anthony Ivanov (France) Luka Pavlovic	Andrey Chepelev (Bulgaria) Gabriel Donev; Savva Polukhin (Spain) Carlos Giraldi
June 17	Kuršumlijska Banja, Serbia; Clay; M15; Singles and doubles draws	(Serbia) Stefan Latinović (North Macedonia) Obrad Markovski; 1–6, 7–6^{(7–4)}, [10–7]	(Czech Republic) Jan Hrazdil (Czech Republic) Václav Šafránek	(Bulgaria) Simon Anthony Ivanov (France) Luka Pavlovic	Andrey Chepelev (Bulgaria) Gabriel Donev; Savva Polukhin (Spain) Carlos Giraldi
June 17	Hillcrest, South Africa; Hard; M15; Singles and doubles draws	(South Africa) Philip Henning; 6–4, 6–4	(Namibia) Connor Henry van Schalkwyk	(South Africa) Devin Badenhorst (South Africa) Alec Beckley	(United Kingdom) Luc Koenig (Costa Rica) Jesse Flores (India) Aryan Shah (Bulgaria) Alexander Donski
June 17	Hillcrest, South Africa; Hard; M15; Singles and doubles draws	(South Africa) Alec Beckley (Bulgaria) Alexander Donski; 7–6^{(7–5)}, 6–4	(South Africa) Vasilios Caripi (Costa Rica) Jesse Flores	(South Africa) Devin Badenhorst (South Africa) Alec Beckley	(United Kingdom) Luc Koenig (Costa Rica) Jesse Flores (India) Aryan Shah (Bulgaria) Alexander Donski
June 17	Monastir, Tunisia; Hard; M15; Singles and doubles draws	(Portugal) Tiago Pereira; 6–2, 6–0	(New Zealand) Jack Loutit	Egor Agafonov (France) Étienne Donnet	(United States) Michael Zhu (Cyprus) Photos Photiades (Brazil) Paulo André Saraiva dos Santos (France) Fabien Salle
June 17	Monastir, Tunisia; Hard; M15; Singles and doubles draws	(Argentina) Mateo Matulovich (Brazil) Paulo André Saraiva dos Santos; 7–5, 4–6, [10–8]	Egor Agafonov (Kazakhstan) Grigoriy Lomakin	Egor Agafonov (France) Étienne Donnet	(United States) Michael Zhu (Cyprus) Photos Photiades (Brazil) Paulo André Saraiva dos Santos (France) Fabien Salle
June 17	Rancho Santa Fe, United States; Hard; M15; Singles and doubles draws	(United States) Learner Tien; 6–3, 6–1	(United Kingdom) Matthew Summers	(United States) Trevor Svajda (Japan) Jay Dylan Hara Friend	(United States) Jacob Brumm (Japan) Leo Vithoontien (United States) Collin Altamirano (United States) Aadarsh Tripathi
June 17	Rancho Santa Fe, United States; Hard; M15; Singles and doubles draws	(Australia) Joshua Charlton (United States) Patrick Maloney; 7–6^{(7–5)}, 6–4	(United States) Adam Neff (United States) Trevor Svajda	(United States) Trevor Svajda (Japan) Jay Dylan Hara Friend	(United States) Jacob Brumm (Japan) Leo Vithoontien (United States) Collin Altamirano (United States) Aadarsh Tripathi
June 24	Brussels, Belgium; Clay; M25; Singles and doubles draws	(Netherlands) Max Houkes; 5–7, 6–1, 6–1	(Uzbekistan) Khumoyun Sultanov	(Turkey) Ergi Kırkın (Netherlands) Guy den Ouden	(Germany) Mats Rosenkranz (Norway) Viktor Durasovic (Belgium) Martin van der Meerschen (Netherlands) Jelle Sels
June 24	Brussels, Belgium; Clay; M25; Singles and doubles draws	(Belgium) Simon Beaupain (Norway) Viktor Durasovic; 6–4, 6–2	(Germany) John Sperle (Germany) Marlon Vankan	(Turkey) Ergi Kırkın (Netherlands) Guy den Ouden	(Germany) Mats Rosenkranz (Norway) Viktor Durasovic (Belgium) Martin van der Meerschen (Netherlands) Jelle Sels
June 24	Bourg-en-Bresse, France; Clay; M25; Singles and doubles draws	Marat Sharipov; 6–2, 6–3	(Italy) Lorenzo Giustino	(France) Lilian Marmousez (Italy) Gianmarco Ferrari	Alexey Vatutin (France) Florent Bax (France) Dan Added (Spain) Pol Martín Tiffon
June 24	Bourg-en-Bresse, France; Clay; M25; Singles and doubles draws	(France) Maxence Beaugé (France) Lucas Bouquet; 7–5, 5–7, [10–4]	(Uzbekistan) Denis Istomin; Evgeny Karlovskiy	(France) Lilian Marmousez (Italy) Gianmarco Ferrari	Alexey Vatutin (France) Florent Bax (France) Dan Added (Spain) Pol Martín Tiffon
June 24	Satu Mare, Romania; Clay; M25; Singles and doubles draws	(Romania) Cezar Crețu; 6–2, 3–0, ret.	(Czech Republic) Martin Krumich	(Romania) Ștefan Paloși (Romania) Nicholas David Ionel	(Romania) Radu Mihai Papoe (Ukraine) Eric Vanshelboim (Slovakia) Radovan Michalik (Italy) Francesco Ferrari
June 24	Satu Mare, Romania; Clay; M25; Singles and doubles draws	(Bulgaria) Petr Nesterov (Ukraine) Vladyslav Orlov; 6–4, 6–2	(Slovakia) Miloš Karol (United Kingdom) Michael Shaw	(Romania) Ștefan Paloși (Romania) Nicholas David Ionel	(Romania) Radu Mihai Papoe (Ukraine) Eric Vanshelboim (Slovakia) Radovan Michalik (Italy) Francesco Ferrari
June 24	Hillcrest, South Africa; Hard; M25; Singles and doubles draws	(South Africa) Khololwam Montsi; 6–4, 6–2	(South Africa) Devin Badenhorst	(Costa Rica) Jesse Flores (India) Aryan Shah	(South Africa) Leo Matthysen (India) Ishaque Eqbal (Italy) Luca Fantini (South Africa) Alec Beckley
June 24	Hillcrest, South Africa; Hard; M25; Singles and doubles draws	(Egypt) Akram El Sallaly (South Africa) Khololwam Montsi; 6–2, 6–4	(South Africa) Vasilios Caripi (Costa Rica) Jesse Flores	(Costa Rica) Jesse Flores (India) Aryan Shah	(South Africa) Leo Matthysen (India) Ishaque Eqbal (Italy) Luca Fantini (South Africa) Alec Beckley
June 24	Bakio, Spain; Hard; M25; Singles and doubles draws	(France) Clément Chidekh; 7–6^{(7–3)}, 6–3	(France) Robin Bertrand	(France) Lucas Poullain (Spain) Alex Martínez	(China) Cui Jie (United Kingdom) Alastair Gray (China) Sun Fajing (Spain) Miguel Damas
June 24	Bakio, Spain; Hard; M25; Singles and doubles draws	(France) Robin Bertrand (Spain) John Echevarría; 6–2, 6–4	(Spain) Alejo Sánchez Quílez (Spain) Benjamín Winter López	(France) Lucas Poullain (Spain) Alex Martínez	(China) Cui Jie (United Kingdom) Alastair Gray (China) Sun Fajing (Spain) Miguel Damas
June 24	Klosters, Switzerland; Clay; M25; Singles and doubles draws	(Switzerland) Rémy Bertola; 6–2, 6–1	(Germany) Patrick Zahraj	(Australia) Matthew Dellavedova (Zimbabwe) Benjamin Lock	(Germany) Tim Handel (Switzerland) Dylan Dietrich (Switzerland) Mika Brunold (Switzerland) Johan Nikles
June 24	Klosters, Switzerland; Clay; M25; Singles and doubles draws	(Switzerland) Rémy Bertola (Switzerland) Jakub Paul; 6–4, 7–5	(Zimbabwe) Benjamin Lock (Zimbabwe) Courtney John Lock	(Australia) Matthew Dellavedova (Zimbabwe) Benjamin Lock	(Germany) Tim Handel (Switzerland) Dylan Dietrich (Switzerland) Mika Brunold (Switzerland) Johan Nikles
June 24	Tianjin, China; Hard; M15; Singles and doubles draws	(India) Mukund Sasikumar; 6–3, 6–3	(Thailand) Wishaya Trongcharoenchaikul	(China) Dong Zhenxiong; Valentin Kopeikin	(Chinese Taipei) Huang Tsung-hao (Philippines) Alberto Lim Jr. (Australia) Zachary Viiala (China) Mo Yecong
June 24	Tianjin, China; Hard; M15; Singles and doubles draws	(Chinese Taipei) Ray Ho (China) Yang Zijiang; 6–3, 6–3	(China) Jin Yuquan (China) Li Zekai	(China) Dong Zhenxiong; Valentin Kopeikin	(Chinese Taipei) Huang Tsung-hao (Philippines) Alberto Lim Jr. (Australia) Zachary Viiala (China) Mo Yecong
June 24	Kamen, Germany; Clay; M15; Singles and doubles draws	Svyatoslav Gulin; 6–2, 7–5	(Germany) Mariano Dedura-Palomero	(Germany) Liam Gavrielides (Germany) Diego Dedura-Palomero	(Spain) Rafael Izquierdo Luque (Germany) Justin Engel (Germany) Tom Gentzsch (Slovakia) Tomáš Lánik
June 24	Kamen, Germany; Clay; M15; Singles and doubles draws	(Germany) Taym Al Azmeh (Syria) Hazem Naw; 1–6, 7–5, [10–5]	(Germany) Jasper Camehn (Germany) Moritz Kudernatsch	(Germany) Liam Gavrielides (Germany) Diego Dedura-Palomero	(Spain) Rafael Izquierdo Luque (Germany) Justin Engel (Germany) Tom Gentzsch (Slovakia) Tomáš Lánik
June 24	Bergamo, Italy; Clay; M15; Singles and doubles draws	(Slovakia) Andrej Martin; 6–3, 6–3	(Italy) Gianluca Cadenasso	(Argentina) Juan Pablo Paz (Italy) Alessandro Pecci	(Argentina) Lucio Carnevalle (Italy) Stefano D'Agostino (Italy) Juan Cruz Martin Manzano (Italy) Carlo Alberto Caniato
June 24	Bergamo, Italy; Clay; M15; Singles and doubles draws	(Italy) Niccolo Catini (Italy) Noah Perfetti; 6–4, 3–6, [10–5]	(Italy) Carlo Alberto Caniato (Italy) Leonardo Malgaroli	(Argentina) Juan Pablo Paz (Italy) Alessandro Pecci	(Argentina) Lucio Carnevalle (Italy) Stefano D'Agostino (Italy) Juan Cruz Martin Manzano (Italy) Carlo Alberto Caniato
June 24	Ust-Kamenogorsk, Kazakhstan; Hard; M15; Singles and doubles draws	Petr Bar Biryukov; 6–4, 6–3	Martin Borisiouk	Saveliy Ivanov; Savriyan Danilov	Daniel Khazime; Maxim Zhukov (Israel) Eyal Shumilov (Uzbekistan) Sergey Fomin
June 24	Ust-Kamenogorsk, Kazakhstan; Hard; M15; Singles and doubles draws	(Japan) Shinji Hazawa (Japan) Kazuma Kawachi; 6–2, 6–2	Daniel Khazime; Maxim Zhukov	Saveliy Ivanov; Savriyan Danilov	Daniel Khazime; Maxim Zhukov (Israel) Eyal Shumilov (Uzbekistan) Sergey Fomin
June 24	Tangier, Morocco; Clay; M15; Singles and doubles draws	(Argentina) Juan Estévez; 0–6, 6–3, 6–3	(Spain) Mario González Fernández	(Italy) Massimo Giunta (Netherlands) Stijn Slump	(Morocco) Reda Bennani (Japan) Hayato Matsuoka (France) Pablo Trochu (France) Maxence Rivet
June 24	Tangier, Morocco; Clay; M15; Singles and doubles draws	(Morocco) Walid Ahouda (Morocco) Hamza El Amine; 6–3, 7–5	(Morocco) Reda Bennani (Italy) Federico Bondioli	(Italy) Massimo Giunta (Netherlands) Stijn Slump	(Morocco) Reda Bennani (Japan) Hayato Matsuoka (France) Pablo Trochu (France) Maxence Rivet
June 24	Alkmaar, Netherlands; Clay; M15; Singles and doubles draws	(Netherlands) Deney Wassermann; 7–6^{(10–8)}, 6–4	(Luxembourg) Chris Rodesch	(Germany) Adrian Oetzbach (Netherlands) Michiel de Krom	(Denmark) Christian Sigsgaard (Netherlands) Alec Deckers (Netherlands) Niels Lootsma (Germany) Mika Lipp
June 24	Alkmaar, Netherlands; Clay; M15; Singles and doubles draws	(Netherlands) Niels Lootsma (Netherlands) Niels Visker; 4–6, 7–6^{(7–5)}, [10–2]	(Netherlands) Stian Klaassen (Netherlands) Fons van Sambeek	(Germany) Adrian Oetzbach (Netherlands) Michiel de Krom	(Denmark) Christian Sigsgaard (Netherlands) Alec Deckers (Netherlands) Niels Lootsma (Germany) Mika Lipp
June 24	Wrocław, Poland; Clay; M15; Singles and doubles draws	(Poland) Paweł Juszczak; 6–1, 7–5	(Republic of Ireland) Michael Agwi	(Switzerland) Henri Laaksonen (Ukraine) Yurii Dzhavakian	(Poland) Karol Drzewiecki (France) Arthur Bonnaud (Norway) Herman Høyeraal (Poland) Kacper Żuk
June 24	Wrocław, Poland; Clay; M15; Singles and doubles draws	(Ukraine) Nikita Mashtakov (Latvia) Robert Strombachs; 7–6^{(7–5)}, 7–5	(Poland) Szymon Walków (Poland) Kacper Żuk	(Switzerland) Henri Laaksonen (Ukraine) Yurii Dzhavakian	(Poland) Karol Drzewiecki (France) Arthur Bonnaud (Norway) Herman Høyeraal (Poland) Kacper Żuk
June 24	Belgrade, Serbia; Clay; M15; Singles and doubles draws	(Serbia) Vuk Rađenović; 5–7, 6–4, 6–1	(Greece) Ioannis Xilas	(Serbia) Dušan Obradović (Serbia) Viktor Jović	(Czech Republic) Jan Hrazdil (Argentina) Lautaro Agustin Falabella (Slovakia) Lukáš Pokorný (Bosnia and Herzegovina) Andrej Nedić
June 24	Belgrade, Serbia; Clay; M15; Singles and doubles draws	(Serbia) Aleksandar Ljubojević (Serbia) Dušan Obradović; 6–7^{(2–7)}, 7–5, [10–7]	(Chile) Alejandro Bancalari (Chile) Nicolás Villalón	(Serbia) Dušan Obradović (Serbia) Viktor Jović	(Czech Republic) Jan Hrazdil (Argentina) Lautaro Agustin Falabella (Slovakia) Lukáš Pokorný (Bosnia and Herzegovina) Andrej Nedić
June 24	Monastir, Tunisia; Hard; M15; Singles and doubles draws	(Croatia) Mili Poljičak; 7–5, 6–1	(Switzerland) Patrick Schön	(United States) Jackson Ross (Italy) Pietro Marino	(Greece) Demetris Azoides (Portugal) João Graça (Egypt) Amr Elsayed (Mexico) Alan Magadán
June 24	Monastir, Tunisia; Hard; M15; Singles and doubles draws	(Portugal) Tiago Pereira (Switzerland) Patrick Schön; 6–1, 6–7^{(6–8)}, [10–7]	(Mexico) Alan Magadán (Portugal) Tomás Pinho	(United States) Jackson Ross (Italy) Pietro Marino	(Greece) Demetris Azoides (Portugal) João Graça (Egypt) Amr Elsayed (Mexico) Alan Magadán
June 24	Los Angeles, United States; Hard; M15; Singles and doubles draws	(United States) Patrick Maloney; 6–3, 1–6, 6–3	(United States) Colton Smith	(Luxembourg) Alex Knaff (Japan) Jay Dylan Hara Friend	(United States) Thai-Son Kwiatkowski (United States) Jack Anthrop (United States) Keegan Smith (United States) Spencer Johnson
June 24	Los Angeles, United States; Hard; M15; Singles and doubles draws	(Australia) Joshua Charlton (United States) Patrick Maloney; 7–6^{(7–5)}, 7–5^{(8–6)}	(United States) Jack Anthrop (United States) Bryce Nakashima	(Luxembourg) Alex Knaff (Japan) Jay Dylan Hara Friend	(United States) Thai-Son Kwiatkowski (United States) Jack Anthrop (United States) Keegan Smith (United States) Spencer Johnson
