= Felix Mischker =

British tennis player (born 2003)

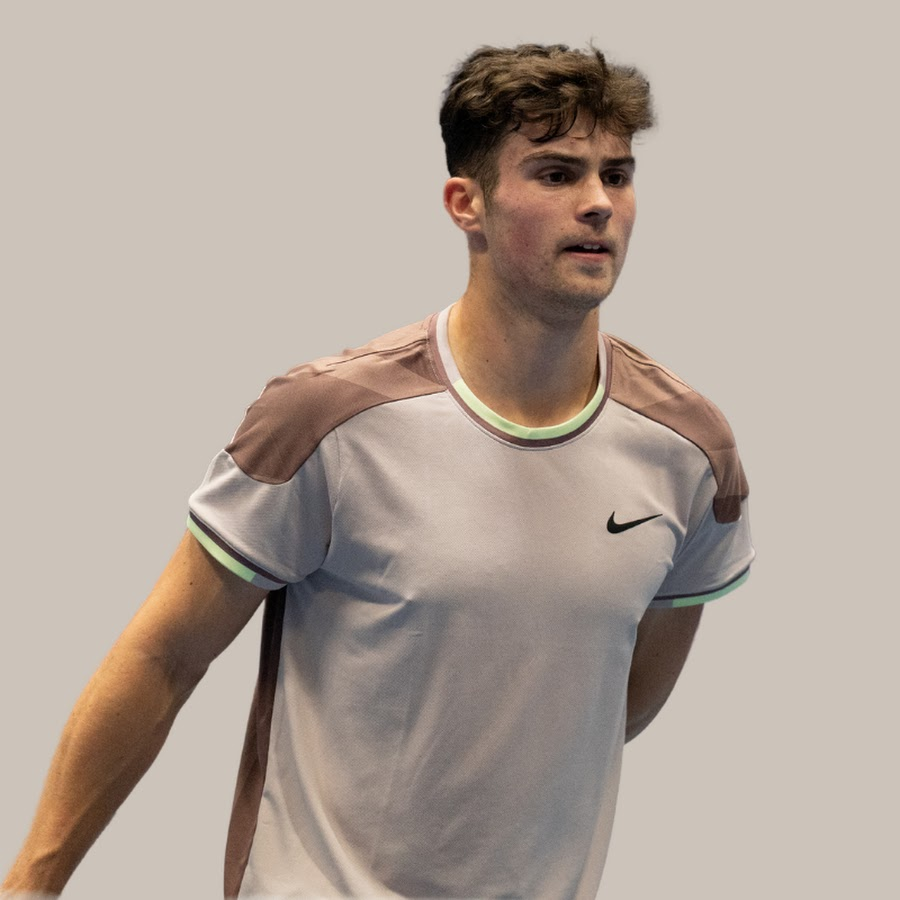
- Full name: Felix Sebastian Michael Mischker
- Country (sports): (United Kingdom) Great Britain
- Born: 27 June 2003 (age 23) London, England
- Height: 1.83 m (6 ft 0 in)
- Prize money: US $10,392

Singles
- Career record: 0–0 (at ATP Tour level, Grand Slam level, and in Davis Cup)
- Career titles: 0
- Highest ranking: No. 1747 (4 December 2023)

Doubles
- Career record: 0–0 (at ATP Tour level, Grand Slam level, and in Davis Cup)
- Career titles: 2 ITF
- Highest ranking: No. 760 (21 October 2024)
- Current ranking: No. 1023 (22 June 2026)
- Last updated on: 22 June 2026.

Felix Mischker (born 27 June 2003) is a British tennis player.

== Early life ==
He developed an interest in tennis from a young age and began producing tennis-related videos while still at school. During his teenage years, he built an online audience through content documenting his training and competitive experiences as a junior player.

According to an ATP Tour interview, Mischker chose to pursue a professional tennis career rather than attend university, funding much of his career through revenue generated from YouTube and sponsorships.

== Career ==
Mischker competes on the ITF World Tennis Tour and has documented his progress through professional tennis alongside his online career. His long-running project, Road to One ATP Point, followed his attempt to earn his first ATP singles ranking point.

His early professional career was disrupted by injuries, including elbow surgery, delaying his progress on the ITF circuit. In 2023, he earned his first ATP singles ranking point at an ITF tournament in Monastir, Tunisia, achieving the goal that had inspired his video series.

Mischker has also participated in practice sessions and media activities involving ATP Tour events and players, including practice opportunities with Stefanos Tsitsipas, Hamad Medjedovic and Rafael Jodar during ATP events.

== YouTube channel ==
Mischker is the creator of the YouTube channel Tennis Brothers, which documents his experiences as an aspiring professional tennis player and provides behind-the-scenes coverage of life on the professional tennis circuit.

The channel gained prominence through its Road to One ATP Point series, chronicling Mischker's attempt to earn an ATP ranking point while balancing the financial and competitive demands of professional tennis. The content includes tournament vlogs, training sessions, match analysis and collaborations with professional players and coaches.

Revenue from YouTube advertising and sponsorships has contributed to funding Mischker's playing career, while the channel has provided opportunities to create content at ATP Tour events and feature interactions with professional players.

== ITF Circuit finals ==
=== Doubles: 5 (2 titles, 3 runners-up) ===
Result	W–L	Date	Tournament	Tier	Surface	Partner	Opponents	Score
Loss	0–1	Aug 2023	M15 Antalya, Turkey	ITF WTT	Clay	(United Kingdom) Raffaello Papajcik	(Spain) Jorge Plans (United Kingdom) Giacomo Revelli	7–6^{(4)}, 6^{(7)}–7, [5–10]
Win	1–1	Feb 2024	M25 Antalya, Turkey	ITF WTT	Clay	(Republic of Ireland) Michael Agwi	(Turkey) Mert Alkaya (Turkey) S Mert Ozdemir	6–3, 6–2
Loss	1–2	April 2024	M15 Antalya, Turkey	ITF WTT	Clay	(Argentina) Juan Pablo Paz	(Czech Republic) Jiri Barnat (Slovakia) Tomas Lanik	7–6^{(5)}, 6–2
Win	2–2	Jan 2026	M25 Antalya, Turkey	ITF WTT	Clay	(Belgium) Martin Van Der Meerschen	(Bulgaria) Yanaki Milev (Serbia) Stefan Popovic	6–1, 2–6, [10–8]
Loss	2–3	Jul 2026	M15 Dublin, Ireland	ITF WTT	Carpet	(Republic of Ireland) Michael Agwi	(Spain) Pablo Perez Ramos (Republic of Ireland) Michael Wright	1–6, 5–7
