= 2025 ITF Men's World Tennis Tour (July–September) =

The 2025 ITF Men's World Tennis Tour is the 2025 edition of the second-tier tour for men's professional tennis. It is organised by the International Tennis Federation and is a tier below the ATP Challenger Tour. The ITF Men's World Tennis Tour includes tournaments with prize money ranging from $15,000 to $25,000.

Since 2022, following the Russian invasion of Ukraine the ITF announced that players from Belarus and Russia could still play on the tour but would not be allowed to play under the flag of Belarus or Russia.

== Key ==
M25 tournaments
M15 tournaments

== Month ==
=== July ===
Week of	Tournament	Winner	Runners-up	Semifinalists	Quarterfinalists
July 7	Bastia-Lucciana, France; Clay; M25+H; Singles and doubles draws	(Switzerland) Kilian Feldbausch; 6–3, 3–6, 6–4	(Austria) Joel Schwärzler	(Italy) Gianluca Cadenasso (Italy) Facundo Juárez	(France) Sascha Gueymard Wayenburg (France) Thomas Faurel (France) Tristan Lamasine (France) Arthur Bonnaud
July 7	Bastia-Lucciana, France; Clay; M25+H; Singles and doubles draws	(Switzerland) Tanguy Genier (Switzerland) Johan Nikles; 6–1, 1–6, [10–8]	(India) S D Prajwal Dev (India) Nitin Kumar Sinha	(Italy) Gianluca Cadenasso (Italy) Facundo Juárez	(France) Sascha Gueymard Wayenburg (France) Thomas Faurel (France) Tristan Lamasine (France) Arthur Bonnaud
July 7	Kassel, Germany; Clay; M25+H; Singles and doubles draws	(Czech Republic) Jonáš Forejtek; 6–2, 6–3	(Spain) Carlos Sánchez Jover	(Czech Republic) Daniel Siniakov (Germany) Elmar Ejupovic	(Uzbekistan) Sergey Fomin (Dominican Republic) Nick Hardt; Alexey Vatutin (Slovakia) Andrej Martin
July 7	Kassel, Germany; Clay; M25+H; Singles and doubles draws	(France) Max Westphal (United States) Theodore Winegar; 7–6^{(7–2)}, 6–3	(Bulgaria) Petr Nesterov (Ukraine) Oleksandr Ovcharenko	(Czech Republic) Daniel Siniakov (Germany) Elmar Ejupovic	(Uzbekistan) Sergey Fomin (Dominican Republic) Nick Hardt; Alexey Vatutin (Slovakia) Andrej Martin
July 7	Roda de Berà, Spain; Hard; M25; Singles and doubles draws	(Colombia) Adrià Soriano Barrera; 7–6^{(15–13)}, 6–3	(Spain) Roger Pascual Ferrà	(Spain) Albert Pedrico Kravtsov (Spain) John Echeverria	Ilia Simakin (United States) Richard Zusman (China) Sun Fajing (France) Clément Chidekh
July 7	Roda de Berà, Spain; Hard; M25; Singles and doubles draws	(Spain) Alberto Barroso Campos (Spain) Iñaki Montes de la Torre; 6–4, 3–1 ret.	(Spain) Mario Mansilla Díez (Spain) Bruno Pujol Navarro	(Spain) Albert Pedrico Kravtsov (Spain) John Echeverria	Ilia Simakin (United States) Richard Zusman (China) Sun Fajing (France) Clément Chidekh
July 7	The Hague, Netherlands; Clay; M25; Singles and doubles draws	Ivan Gakhov; 3–6, 6–4, 7–5	(Netherlands) Ryan Nijboer	(Japan) Jay Dylan Hara Friend (Netherlands) Alec Deckers	(Ukraine) Eric Vanshelboim (Netherlands) Niels Visker (Belgium) Romain Faucon (Belgium) Michael Geerts
July 7	The Hague, Netherlands; Clay; M25; Singles and doubles draws	(Netherlands) Jarno Jans (Netherlands) Niels Visker; 4–6, 7–6^{(7–1)}, [10–7]	(Netherlands) Stian Klaassen (Netherlands) Stijn Paardekooper	(Japan) Jay Dylan Hara Friend (Netherlands) Alec Deckers	(Ukraine) Eric Vanshelboim (Netherlands) Niels Visker (Belgium) Romain Faucon (Belgium) Michael Geerts
July 7	Villavicencio, Colombia; Clay; M25; Singles and doubles draws	(Colombia) Samuel Alejandro Linde Palacios; 6–1, 6–4	(Brazil) Paulo André Saraiva dos Santos	(Colombia) Salvador Price (Dominican Republic) Peter Bertran	(Colombia) Samuel Heredia (Brazil) José Pereira (Colombia) Johan Alexander Rodríguez (Colombia) Miguel Tobón
July 7	Villavicencio, Colombia; Clay; M25; Singles and doubles draws	(Brazil) José Pereira (Brazil) Paulo André Saraiva dos Santos; 6–3, 7–6^{(7–5)}	(Brazil) João Victor Couto Loureiro (Brazil) Eduardo Ribeiro	(Colombia) Salvador Price (Dominican Republic) Peter Bertran	(Colombia) Samuel Heredia (Brazil) José Pereira (Colombia) Johan Alexander Rodríguez (Colombia) Miguel Tobón
July 7	Dallas, United States; Hard (i); M25; Singles and doubles draws	(United States) Samir Banerjee; 5–7, 6–1, 6–4	(United States) Alex Rybakov	(India) Dhakshineswar Suresh (United States) Aidan Kim	(Mexico) Alan Magadán (Japan) Leo Vithoontien (United States) Trevor Svajda (United Kingdom) Aidan McHugh
July 7	Dallas, United States; Hard (i); M25; Singles and doubles draws	(United States) Samir Banerjee (United States) Bruno Kuzuhara; 6–4, 6–3	(Japan) Kosuke Ogura (Japan) Leo Vithoontien	(India) Dhakshineswar Suresh (United States) Aidan Kim	(Mexico) Alan Magadán (Japan) Leo Vithoontien (United States) Trevor Svajda (United Kingdom) Aidan McHugh
July 7	Tokyo, Japan; Hard; M15; Singles and doubles draws	(Japan) Renta Tokuda; 6–3, 6–2	(Japan) Shintaro Imai	(South Korea) Shin Woobin (Japan) Kokoro Isomura	(Japan) Yusuke Kusuhara (Australia) Jake Delaney (Turkey) Koray Kırcı (Northern Mariana Islands) Colin Sinclair
July 7	Tokyo, Japan; Hard; M15; Singles and doubles draws	(Japan) Sho Katayama (Japan) Yuhei Kono; 7–6^{(7–3)}, 6–3	(United States) Kyle Seelig (Northern Mariana Islands) Colin Sinclair	(South Korea) Shin Woobin (Japan) Kokoro Isomura	(Japan) Yusuke Kusuhara (Australia) Jake Delaney (Turkey) Koray Kırcı (Northern Mariana Islands) Colin Sinclair
July 7	Ma'anshan, China; Hard (i); M15; Singles and doubles draws	(Australia) Akira Santillan; 3–6, 6–3, 7–6^{(7–5)}	(Thailand) Kasidit Samrej	(Latvia) Kārlis Ozoliņš (South Korea) Shin Sanhui	(China) Wang Aoran (China) Xiao Linang (Japan) Koki Matsuda (Thailand) Thanapet Chanta
July 7	Ma'anshan, China; Hard (i); M15; Singles and doubles draws	(Australia) Akira Santillan (China) Yang Mingyuan; 6–2, 6–3	(China) Wang Aoran (China) Zhang Changli	(Latvia) Kārlis Ozoliņš (South Korea) Shin Sanhui	(China) Wang Aoran (China) Xiao Linang (Japan) Koki Matsuda (Thailand) Thanapet Chanta
July 7	Łódź, Poland; Clay; M15; Singles and doubles draws	(Finland) Eero Vasa; 6–2, 6–2	(Poland) Tomasz Berkieta	(Belgium) Tibo Colson (France) Adrien Gobat	(Poland) Kacper Szymkowiak (Czech Republic) Matyáš Černý (Poland) Kacper Knitter (Ukraine) Nikita Mashtakov
July 7	Łódź, Poland; Clay; M15; Singles and doubles draws	(Brazil) Igor Marcondes (Sweden) Nikola Slavic; 6–3, 6–4	(Italy) Niccolò Catini (Ukraine) Nikita Mashtakov	(Belgium) Tibo Colson (France) Adrien Gobat	(Poland) Kacper Szymkowiak (Czech Republic) Matyáš Černý (Poland) Kacper Knitter (Ukraine) Nikita Mashtakov
July 7	Telfs, Austria; Clay; M15; Singles and doubles draws	(Austria) Sebastian Sorger; 6–4, 4–6, 6–3	(Italy) Giovanni Oradini	(Czech Republic) Matthew William Donald (Italy) Stefano D'Agostino	(Austria) Dennis Novak (Luxembourg) Louis Van Herck (Sweden) Karl Friberg (Czech Republic) Ondřej Horák
July 7	Telfs, Austria; Clay; M15; Singles and doubles draws	(Austria) Gregor Ramskogler (Germany) Kai Wehnelt; 7–5, 6–4	(Czech Republic) Ondřej Horák (Czech Republic) Štěpán Pecák	(Czech Republic) Matthew William Donald (Italy) Stefano D'Agostino	(Austria) Dennis Novak (Luxembourg) Louis Van Herck (Sweden) Karl Friberg (Czech Republic) Ondřej Horák
July 7	Litija, Slovenia; Clay; M15; Singles and doubles draws	(France) Lilian Marmousez; 2–6, 6–3, 6–1	(Italy) Michele Ribecai	(United Kingdom) Millen Hurrion (Belgium) Jack Logé	(Argentina) Lautaro Agustín Falabella (France) Felix Balshaw (Belgium) Émilien Demanet (Slovenia) Bor Artnak
July 7	Litija, Slovenia; Clay; M15; Singles and doubles draws	(Italy) Gabriele Bosio (Greece) Dimitris Sakellaridis; 7–5, 7–6^{(7–3)}	(Argentina) Lautaro Agustín Falabella (Italy) Michele Ribecai	(United Kingdom) Millen Hurrion (Belgium) Jack Logé	(Argentina) Lautaro Agustín Falabella (France) Felix Balshaw (Belgium) Émilien Demanet (Slovenia) Bor Artnak
July 7	Kuršumlijska Banja, Serbia; Clay; M15; Singles and doubles draws	(Greece) Ioannis Xilas; 6–4, 6–4	(Serbia) Ognjen Milić	(Bulgaria) Yanaki Milev (Serbia) Kristijan Juhas	(Italy) Andrea Fiorentini; Denis Klok (Argentina) Franco Ribero (Italy) Pietro Romeo Scomparin
July 7	Kuršumlijska Banja, Serbia; Clay; M15; Singles and doubles draws	Mikalai Haliak; Aleksandr Lobanov; 5–7, 6–4, [10–7]	(Bulgaria) Georgi Georgiev (Bulgaria) Viktor Markov	(Bulgaria) Yanaki Milev (Serbia) Kristijan Juhas	(Italy) Andrea Fiorentini; Denis Klok (Argentina) Franco Ribero (Italy) Pietro Romeo Scomparin
July 7	Monastir, Tunisia; Hard; M15; Singles and doubles draws	(India) Karan Singh; 6–0, 6–2	(Algeria) Toufik Sahtali	(Nicaragua) Joaquin Guilleme (United States) Cooper Williams	(France) Maxence Bertimon (Turkey) Yankı Erel (France) Cyril Vandermeersch (New Zealand) Isaac Becroft
July 7	Monastir, Tunisia; Hard; M15; Singles and doubles draws	(United Kingdom) Matthew Rankin (United States) Cooper Williams; 6–3, 5–7, [10–5]	Daniil Bogatov; Evgenii Tiurnev	(Nicaragua) Joaquin Guilleme (United States) Cooper Williams	(France) Maxence Bertimon (Turkey) Yankı Erel (France) Cyril Vandermeersch (New Zealand) Isaac Becroft
July 7	Hillcrest, South Africa; Hard; M15; Singles and doubles draws	(South Africa) Philip Henning; 4–6, 6–4, 6–2	(Poland) Filip Peliwo	(South Africa) Thando Longwe-Smit (Turkey) Ergi Kırkın	(India) Digvijaypratap Singh (United Kingdom) Luc Koenig (Cyprus) Melios Efstathiou (South Africa) Marc van der Merwe
July 7	Hillcrest, South Africa; Hard; M15; Singles and doubles draws	(South Africa) Devin Badenhorst (United Kingdom) Luc Koenig; 7–6^{(7–4)}, 7–6^{(8–6)}	(Egypt) Akram El Sallaly (South Africa) Khololwam Montsi	(South Africa) Thando Longwe-Smit (Turkey) Ergi Kırkın	(India) Digvijaypratap Singh (United Kingdom) Luc Koenig (Cyprus) Melios Efstathiou (South Africa) Marc van der Merwe
July 7	Salta, Argentina; Clay; M15; Singles and doubles draws	(Argentina) Santiago de la Fuente; Walkover	(Argentina) Guido Iván Justo	(Brazil) Gustavo Ribeiro de Almeida (Argentina) Máximo Zeitune	(Brazil) Igor Gimenez (Argentina) Tomás Martinez (Argentina) Tomás Farjat (Argentina) Lorenzo Joaquín Rodríguez
July 7	Salta, Argentina; Clay; M15; Singles and doubles draws	(Argentina) Thiago Cigarrán (Argentina) Tomás Farjat; 6–3, 6–2	(Argentina) Santiago de la Fuente (Argentina) Nicolas Hollender	(Brazil) Gustavo Ribeiro de Almeida (Argentina) Máximo Zeitune	(Brazil) Igor Gimenez (Argentina) Tomás Martinez (Argentina) Tomás Farjat (Argentina) Lorenzo Joaquín Rodríguez
July 7	San Diego, United States; Hard; M15; Singles and doubles draws	(Australia) Dane Sweeny; 1–6, 6–3, 6–2	(United States) Keegan Smith	(United States) Gianluca Brunkow (United States) Spencer Johnson	(United States) Kaylan Bigun (United States) Kyle Kang; Savriyan Danilov (United States) Rohan Murali
July 7	San Diego, United States; Hard; M15; Singles and doubles draws	(United States) Rudy Quan (United States) Emon van Loben Sels; 6–4, 6–3	(United States) Jayson Blando (United States) Michael Blando	(United States) Gianluca Brunkow (United States) Spencer Johnson	(United States) Kaylan Bigun (United States) Kyle Kang; Savriyan Danilov (United States) Rohan Murali
July 14	Castelo Branco, Portugal; Hard; M25; Singles and doubles draws	(United Kingdom) Charles Broom; 6–2, 6–2	(United States) Maxwell McKennon	(France) Lucas Poullain (Australia) Marc Polmans	(Sweden) Leo Borg (Senegal) Seydina André (Portugal) Tiago Silva (Spain) Iván Marrero Curbelo
July 14	Castelo Branco, Portugal; Hard; M25; Singles and doubles draws	(Portugal) Francisco Rocha (Portugal) Tiago Silva; 3–6, 7–6^{(7–2)}, [10–1]	(United Kingdom) Luca Pow (United Kingdom) Charlie Robertson	(France) Lucas Poullain (Australia) Marc Polmans	(Sweden) Leo Borg (Senegal) Seydina André (Portugal) Tiago Silva (Spain) Iván Marrero Curbelo
July 14	Gandia, Spain; Clay; M25; Singles and doubles draws	(Spain) Carlos López Montagud; 6–4, 6–7^{(10–12)}, 7–6^{(7–4)}	(United States) Tristan McCormick	(Spain) Sergi Pérez Contri (Spain) Lucca Helguera Casado	(Italy) Jacopo Berrettini (Bulgaria) Anas Mazdrashki (Spain) Diego Augusto Barreto Sánchez (Spain) Andrés Santamarta Roig
July 14	Gandia, Spain; Clay; M25; Singles and doubles draws	(Spain) Diego Augusto Barreto Sánchez (Spain) Alejandro Manzanera Pertusa; 6–2, 6–2	(Switzerland) Adrien Burdet (Bulgaria) Yanaki Milev	(Spain) Sergi Pérez Contri (Spain) Lucca Helguera Casado	(Italy) Jacopo Berrettini (Bulgaria) Anas Mazdrashki (Spain) Diego Augusto Barreto Sánchez (Spain) Andrés Santamarta Roig
July 14	Uriage-les-Bains, France; Clay; M25; Singles and doubles draws	(Belgium) Gilles-Arnaud Bailly; 6–4, 7–6^{(7–1)}	Marat Sharipov	(France) Tristan Lamasine; Nikolay Vylegzhanin	(Switzerland) Johan Nikles (France) Damien Clerc (France) Arthur Bellegy (France) Lucas Bouquet
July 14	Uriage-les-Bains, France; Clay; M25; Singles and doubles draws	(France) Lenny Couturier (France) Timeo Trufelli; 6–3, 3–6, [10–8]	(Norway) Lukas Hellum Lilleengen (France) Max Westphal	(France) Tristan Lamasine; Nikolay Vylegzhanin	(Switzerland) Johan Nikles (France) Damien Clerc (France) Arthur Bellegy (France) Lucas Bouquet
July 14	Kramsach, Austria; Clay; M25; Singles and doubles draws	(Ukraine) Vladyslav Orlov; 5–7, 6–1, 6–1	(Bosnia and Herzegovina) Andrej Nedić	(Austria) Dennis Novak (Germany) Henri Squire	(Switzerland) Gian Luca Tanner (Austria) Sandro Kopp (Austria) Maximilian Neuchrist (Austria) Niklas Waldner
July 14	Kramsach, Austria; Clay; M25; Singles and doubles draws	(Ukraine) Vladyslav Orlov (Ukraine) Oleksandr Ovcharenko; 4–6, 7–6^{(8–6)}, [10–5]	(Germany) Henri Squire (Switzerland) Jeffrey von der Schulenburg	(Austria) Dennis Novak (Germany) Henri Squire	(Switzerland) Gian Luca Tanner (Austria) Sandro Kopp (Austria) Maximilian Neuchrist (Austria) Niklas Waldner
July 14	Louisville, United States; Hard; M25; Singles and doubles draws	(South Korea) Roh Ho-young; 6–1, 6–4	(United States) Nicolas Ian Kotzen	(United States) Matthew Thomson (United States) Vignesh Gogineni	(United States) Kelly Giese (United Kingdom) Aidan McHugh (United States) Bruno Kuzuhara (United States) Samir Banerjee
July 14	Louisville, United States; Hard; M25; Singles and doubles draws	(United States) Nicolas Ian Kotzen (India) Dhakshineswar Suresh; 6–3, 6–2	(United States) Sekou Bangoura (United States) Benjamin Kittay	(United States) Matthew Thomson (United States) Vignesh Gogineni	(United States) Kelly Giese (United Kingdom) Aidan McHugh (United States) Bruno Kuzuhara (United States) Samir Banerjee
July 14	Nakhon Pathom, Thailand; Hard; M15; Singles and doubles draws	(Czech Republic) Dominik Palán; 6–2, 6–4	(Japan) Takuya Kumasaka	(Japan) Hikaru Shiraishi (Thailand) Thantub Suksumrarn	(Australia) Jesse Delaney (Japan) Yuki Mochizuki (Israel) Orel Kimhi (India) Sidharth Rawat
July 14	Nakhon Pathom, Thailand; Hard; M15; Singles and doubles draws	(South Korea) Park Ui-sung (Thailand) Wishaya Trongcharoenchaikul; 7–6^{(7–5)}, 2–6, [10–6]	(Australia) Jake Delaney (Japan) Ryotaro Taguchi	(Japan) Hikaru Shiraishi (Thailand) Thantub Suksumrarn	(Australia) Jesse Delaney (Japan) Yuki Mochizuki (Israel) Orel Kimhi (India) Sidharth Rawat
July 14	Uslar, Germany; Clay; M15; Singles and doubles draws	(Italy) Iannis Miletich; 6–2, 6–2	(Czech Republic) Tadeáš Paroulek	(Germany) Adrian Oetzbach (Germany) Mika Lipp	(Poland) Marcel Zieliński (Germany) Aaron Funk; Mikalai Haliak (Germany) Michel Hopp
July 14	Uslar, Germany; Clay; M15; Singles and doubles draws	(Germany) Adrian Oetzbach (Czech Republic) Tadeáš Paroulek; 6–2, 6–2	(Netherlands) Daniel de Jonge (Sweden) John Hallquist Lithén	(Germany) Adrian Oetzbach (Germany) Mika Lipp	(Poland) Marcel Zieliński (Germany) Aaron Funk; Mikalai Haliak (Germany) Michel Hopp
July 14	Gubbio, Italy; Clay; M15; Singles and doubles draws	(Italy) Gabriele Piraino; 6–4, 6–1	(Italy) Andrea Meduri	(Italy) Gian Marco Ortenzi (Italy) Samuele Pieri	(Italy) Gabriele Pennaforti (Italy) Gabriele Maria Noce (United States) William Grant (Italy) Michele Ribecai
July 14	Gubbio, Italy; Clay; M15; Singles and doubles draws	(Italy) Jacopo Bilardo (Italy) Niccolò Ciavarella; 6–0, 6–4	(Italy) Alessandro Coccioli (Italy) Lorenzo Lorusso	(Italy) Gian Marco Ortenzi (Italy) Samuele Pieri	(Italy) Gabriele Pennaforti (Italy) Gabriele Maria Noce (United States) William Grant (Italy) Michele Ribecai
July 14	Nova Gorica, Slovenia; Clay; M15; Singles and doubles draws	(Belgium) Émilien Demanet; 6–4, 6–3	(Iran) Kasra Rahmani	(Czech Republic) Zdeněk Kolář (France) Felix Balshaw	(Croatia) Nikola Bašić (Belgium) Jack Logé; Kirill Kivattsev (Switzerland) Timofey Stepanov
July 14	Nova Gorica, Slovenia; Clay; M15; Singles and doubles draws	(Croatia) Admir Kalender (Croatia) Nino Serdarušić; 6–1, 6–4	(Netherlands) Stijn Pel (United States) Oren Vasser	(Czech Republic) Zdeněk Kolář (France) Felix Balshaw	(Croatia) Nikola Bašić (Belgium) Jack Logé; Kirill Kivattsev (Switzerland) Timofey Stepanov
July 14	Poprad, Slovakia; Clay; M15; Singles and doubles draws	(Hungary) Attila Boros; 6–4, 7–6^{(7–3)}	(France) Adrien Gobat	(Czech Republic) Dominik Kellovský (Slovakia) Michal Novanský	(Estonia) Kristjan Tamm (Hungary) Gergely Madarász (Ukraine) Aleksandr Braynin (Finland) Peetu Pohjola
July 14	Poprad, Slovakia; Clay; M15; Singles and doubles draws	(Hungary) Gábor Hornung (Hungary) Péter Sallay; 6–4, 6–4	(Slovakia) Norbert Marošík (Slovakia) Jakub Medved	(Czech Republic) Dominik Kellovský (Slovakia) Michal Novanský	(Estonia) Kristjan Tamm (Hungary) Gergely Madarász (Ukraine) Aleksandr Braynin (Finland) Peetu Pohjola
July 14	Slobozia, Romania; Clay; M15; Singles and doubles draws	(Moldova) Ilya Snițari; 6–2, 2–6, 6–4	(Romania) Radu David Țurcanu	(United Kingdom) Jeremy Gschwendtner (Romania) Rareș Teodor Pieleanu	(Ukraine) Tymur Bieldiugin (Argentina) Franco Ribero (Romania) Robert Guna (Romania) Luca Preda
July 14	Slobozia, Romania; Clay; M15; Singles and doubles draws	(Argentina) Valentín Basel (Argentina) Franco Ribero; 7–5, 3–6, [10–8]	(Italy) Lorenzo Angelini (Italy) Leonardo Cattaneo	(United Kingdom) Jeremy Gschwendtner (Romania) Rareș Teodor Pieleanu	(Ukraine) Tymur Bieldiugin (Argentina) Franco Ribero (Romania) Robert Guna (Romania) Luca Preda
July 14	Kuršumlijska Banja, Serbia; Clay; M15; Singles and doubles draws	(Ukraine) Nikita Bilozertsev; 4–6, 6–1, 6–4	(Serbia) Vlado Jankanj	(Italy) Marcello Serafini (Greece) Ioannis Xilas	(Romania) Ștefan Horia Haita (Israel) Amit Vales (Italy) Antonio Caruso (Cyprus) Andreas Timini
July 14	Kuršumlijska Banja, Serbia; Clay; M15; Singles and doubles draws	(Denmark) Sebastian Grundtvig Jørgensen (Denmark) Carl Emil Overbeck; 7–6^{(7–3)}, 6–2	(Cyprus) Eleftherios Neos; Semen Pankin	(Italy) Marcello Serafini (Greece) Ioannis Xilas	(Romania) Ștefan Horia Haita (Israel) Amit Vales (Italy) Antonio Caruso (Cyprus) Andreas Timini
July 14	Monastir, Tunisia; Hard; M15; Singles and doubles draws	(Tunisia) Aziz Dougaz; 2–6, 6–0, 6–4	(France) Cyril Vandermeersch	(Turkey) Yankı Erel (Spain) Roger Pascual Ferrà	(Tunisia) Wissam Abderrahman (France) Loan Lestir (United Kingdom) Billy Blaydes (Spain) Bernardo Munk Mesa
July 14	Monastir, Tunisia; Hard; M15; Singles and doubles draws	(United States) James Hopper (United Kingdom) Ben Jones; 6–7^{(5–7)}, 6–4, [10–4]	(United Kingdom) Billy Blaydes (United Kingdom) Freddy Blaydes	(Turkey) Yankı Erel (Spain) Roger Pascual Ferrà	(Tunisia) Wissam Abderrahman (France) Loan Lestir (United Kingdom) Billy Blaydes (Spain) Bernardo Munk Mesa
July 14	Hillcrest, South Africa; Hard; M15; Singles and doubles draws	(South Africa) Philip Henning; 6–3, 6–3	(South Africa) Marc van der Merwe	(South Africa) Devin Badenhorst (Poland) Filip Peliwo	(Armenia) Daniil Sarksian (United Kingdom) Luc Koenig (South Africa) Connor Doig (Cyprus) Melios Efstathiou
July 14	Hillcrest, South Africa; Hard; M15; Singles and doubles draws	(South Africa) Devin Badenhorst (United Kingdom) Luc Koenig; 6–1, 6–4	(South Africa) Gerard Henning (South Africa) Philip Henning	(South Africa) Devin Badenhorst (Poland) Filip Peliwo	(Armenia) Daniil Sarksian (United Kingdom) Luc Koenig (South Africa) Connor Doig (Cyprus) Melios Efstathiou
July 14	Bucaramanga, Colombia; Clay; M15; Singles and doubles draws	(Colombia) Johan Alexander Rodríguez; 6–4, 4–6, 6–4	(Brazil) Eduardo Ribeiro	(Chile) Nicolás Villalón (Colombia) Miguel Tobón	(Brazil) João Vítor Scramin do Lago (Colombia) Mateo Castañeda (Colombia) Juan Sebastián Gómez (Colombia) Samuel Heredia
July 14	Bucaramanga, Colombia; Clay; M15; Singles and doubles draws	(Colombia) Miguel Tobón (Greece) Pavlos Tsitsipas; 6–2, 6–3	(Brazil) Breno Braga (Brazil) Victor Braga	(Chile) Nicolás Villalón (Colombia) Miguel Tobón	(Brazil) João Vítor Scramin do Lago (Colombia) Mateo Castañeda (Colombia) Juan Sebastián Gómez (Colombia) Samuel Heredia
July 14	Santa Tecla, El Salvador; Hard; M15; Singles and doubles draws	(Italy) Pietro Orlando Fellin; 6–1, 6–0	(Mexico) Alan Fernando Rubio Fierros	(United States) Daniel Milavsky (Brazil) José Pereira	(France) Guillaume Dalmasso (Venezuela) Ricardo Rodríguez-Pace (United States) Victor Lilov (El Salvador) Cesar Cruz
July 14	Santa Tecla, El Salvador; Hard; M15; Singles and doubles draws	(Venezuela) Juan José Bianchi (United States) Daniel Milavsky; 5–7, 6–4, [10–4]	(El Salvador) Cesar Cruz (El Salvador) Diego Duran	(United States) Daniel Milavsky (Brazil) José Pereira	(France) Guillaume Dalmasso (Venezuela) Ricardo Rodríguez-Pace (United States) Victor Lilov (El Salvador) Cesar Cruz
July 14	Rochester, United States; Clay; M15; Singles and doubles draws	(United States) Andrew Delgado; 6–3, 1–6, 6–4	(United States) Alexander Bernard	(United Kingdom) Blu Baker (United States) Ryan Dickerson	(United States) Michael Antonius (Canada) Benjamin Thomas George (United States) Alexander Razeghi (United States) Liam Krall
July 14	Rochester, United States; Clay; M15; Singles and doubles draws	(United States) Ryan Dickerson (Brazil) João Vítor Gonçalves Ceolin; 6–2, 7–6^{(7–2)}	(United States) Nathan Cox (United States) Cyrus Mahjoob	(United Kingdom) Blu Baker (United States) Ryan Dickerson	(United States) Michael Antonius (Canada) Benjamin Thomas George (United States) Alexander Razeghi (United States) Liam Krall
July 21	Porto, Portugal; Hard; M25; Singles and doubles draws	(Portugal) Gastão Elias; 7–5, 6–7^{(5–7)}, 6–0	(France) Lucas Poullain	(France) Laurent Lokoli (Italy) Luca Potenza	(Italy) Filippo Moroni (Italy) Fabrizio Andaloro (Portugal) Tiago Torres (France) Maé Malige
July 21	Porto, Portugal; Hard; M25; Singles and doubles draws	(Spain) Ignasi Forcano (Italy) Leonardo Rossi; 6–3, 6–7^{(9–11)}, [10–7]	(Portugal) Francisco Rocha (Portugal) Tiago Silva	(France) Laurent Lokoli (Italy) Luca Potenza	(Italy) Filippo Moroni (Italy) Fabrizio Andaloro (Portugal) Tiago Torres (France) Maé Malige
July 21	Dénia, Spain; Clay; M25; Singles and doubles draws	(Spain) Javier Barranco Cosano; 6–0, 5–7, 6–3	(Spain) Pablo Martínez Gómez	(Spain) Miguel Damas (Spain) Carles Hernández	(Bulgaria) Anas Mazdrashki (Spain) Max Alcalá Gurri (Morocco) Reda Bennani (Spain) Nikolás Sánchez Izquierdo
July 21	Dénia, Spain; Clay; M25; Singles and doubles draws	(India) S D Prajwal Dev (India) Nitin Kumar Sinha; 6–3, 6–4	(Spain) Mario Mansilla Díez (Netherlands) Mark Vervoort	(Spain) Miguel Damas (Spain) Carles Hernández	(Bulgaria) Anas Mazdrashki (Spain) Max Alcalá Gurri (Morocco) Reda Bennani (Spain) Nikolás Sánchez Izquierdo
July 21	Metzingen, Germany; Clay; M25; Singles and doubles draws	(Belgium) Jack Logé; 7–6^{(7–4)}, 6–7^{(6–8)}, 6–4	(Brazil) Pedro Boscardin Dias	(Czech Republic) Daniel Siniakov (Brazil) Daniel Dutra da Silva	(Argentina) Juan Bautista Torres (Germany) Adrian Oetzbach (Poland) Maks Kaśnikowski (United Kingdom) Anton Matusevich
July 21	Metzingen, Germany; Clay; M25; Singles and doubles draws	(Brazil) Pedro Boscardin Dias (Brazil) Daniel Dutra da Silva; Walkover	(Germany) Adrian Oetzbach (Czech Republic) Daniel Siniakov	(Czech Republic) Daniel Siniakov (Brazil) Daniel Dutra da Silva	(Argentina) Juan Bautista Torres (Germany) Adrian Oetzbach (Poland) Maks Kaśnikowski (United Kingdom) Anton Matusevich
July 21	Ollersbach, Austria; Clay; M25; Singles and doubles draws	(Ukraine) Viacheslav Bielinskyi; 7–6^{(8–6)}, 7–6^{(7–3)}	(Czech Republic) Jonáš Forejtek	(Germany) Tom Gentzsch (Germany) Elmar Ejupovic	(Slovenia) Filip Jeff Planinšek (Spain) David Jordà Sanchis (France) Amaury Raynel (Austria) Sebastian Sorger
July 21	Ollersbach, Austria; Clay; M25; Singles and doubles draws	(Netherlands) Brian Bozemoj (Netherlands) Daniel de Jonge; 6–7^{(6–8)}, 6–3, [11–9]	(Slovakia) Xavier Jakubovic (Czech Republic) Dominik Kellovský	(Germany) Tom Gentzsch (Germany) Elmar Ejupovic	(Slovenia) Filip Jeff Planinšek (Spain) David Jordà Sanchis (France) Amaury Raynel (Austria) Sebastian Sorger
July 21	Bacău, Romania; Clay; M25+H; Singles and doubles draws	(Italy) Carlo Alberto Caniato; 6–3, 6–2	(Uruguay) Franco Roncadelli	(Brazil) Igor Marcondes (Romania) Radu Mihai Papoe	(Romania) Filip Cristian Jianu (United States) Alexander Frusina (Ukraine) Oleksandr Ovcharenko (Spain) Àlex Martí Pujolras
July 21	Bacău, Romania; Clay; M25+H; Singles and doubles draws	(Uruguay) Franco Roncadelli (Moldova) Ilya Snițari; 5–7, 6–4, [10–5]	(Ukraine) Oleksandr Ovcharenko (Argentina) Juan Pablo Paz	(Brazil) Igor Marcondes (Romania) Radu Mihai Papoe	(Romania) Filip Cristian Jianu (United States) Alexander Frusina (Ukraine) Oleksandr Ovcharenko (Spain) Àlex Martí Pujolras
July 21	São Paulo, Brazil; Clay; M25; Singles and doubles draws	(Brazil) Lucas Andrade da Silva; 4–6, 6–2, 6–2	(Brazil) Gustavo Ribeiro de Almeida	(Brazil) João Eduardo Schiessl (Brazil) Igor Gimenez	(Mexico) Alex Hernández (Brazil) João Victor Couto Loureiro (Mexico) Luis Carlos Álvarez (Greece) Pavlos Tsitsipas
July 21	São Paulo, Brazil; Clay; M25; Singles and doubles draws	(Brazil) Luís Felipe Miguel (Brazil) Luis Guto Miguel; 6–1, 6–2	(Argentina) Tadeo Meneo (Argentina) Bautista Vilicich	(Brazil) João Eduardo Schiessl (Brazil) Igor Gimenez	(Mexico) Alex Hernández (Brazil) João Victor Couto Loureiro (Mexico) Luis Carlos Álvarez (Greece) Pavlos Tsitsipas
July 21	Champaign, United States; Hard; M25; Singles and doubles draws	(United Kingdom) Paul Jubb; 6–1, 7–6^{(7–4)}	(Jamaica) Blaise Bicknell	(United States) Ryan Dickerson (United States) Quinn Vandecasteele	(United States) Kyle Kang (United States) Matthew Forbes (United States) Bruno Kuzuhara (India) Dhakshineswar Suresh
July 21	Champaign, United States; Hard; M25; Singles and doubles draws	(United States) Zachary Fuchs (United States) Wally Thayne; 6–3, 2–6, [10–5]	(United States) Hunter Heck (Japan) Kenta Miyoshi	(United States) Ryan Dickerson (United States) Quinn Vandecasteele	(United States) Kyle Kang (United States) Matthew Forbes (United States) Bruno Kuzuhara (India) Dhakshineswar Suresh
July 21	Wuning, China; Hard; M15; Singles and doubles draws	(South Korea) Shin Sanhui; 6–4, 6–0	(Japan) Daisuke Sumizawa	(South Korea) Lee Duck-hee (China) Fnu Nidunjianzan	(China) Lu Pengyu (China) Zeng Yaojie (Australia) Chase Ferguson (Japan) Taketo Takamisawa
July 21	Wuning, China; Hard; M15; Singles and doubles draws	(China) Jin Yuquan (China) Li Zekai; 7–5, 7–5	(China) Chen Xianfeng (Chinese Taipei) Hsieh Cheng-peng	(South Korea) Lee Duck-hee (China) Fnu Nidunjianzan	(China) Lu Pengyu (China) Zeng Yaojie (Australia) Chase Ferguson (Japan) Taketo Takamisawa
July 21	Nakhon Pathom, Thailand; Hard; M15; Singles and doubles draws	(Australia) Jake Delaney; 6–2, 6–2	(Japan) Takuya Kumasaka	(Japan) Yuki Mochizuki (South Korea) Park Ui-sung	(Thailand) Kasidit Samrej (South Korea) Kwon Soon-woo (Thailand) Siwanat Auytayakul (Japan) Ryotaro Taguchi
July 21	Nakhon Pathom, Thailand; Hard; M15; Singles and doubles draws	(South Korea) Chung Yun-seong (South Korea) Kwon Soon-woo; 6–3, 6–3	(India) Sai Karteek Reddy Ganta (Japan) Tomohiro Masabayashi	(Japan) Yuki Mochizuki (South Korea) Park Ui-sung	(Thailand) Kasidit Samrej (South Korea) Kwon Soon-woo (Thailand) Siwanat Auytayakul (Japan) Ryotaro Taguchi
July 21	Segrate, Italy; Clay; M15; Singles and doubles draws	(Italy) Alexander Weis; 6–4, 6–7^{(6–8)}, 6–1	(Czech Republic) Jan Kumstát	(Italy) Manuel Mazza (Italy) Lorenzo Carboni	(France) Lilian Marmousez (Italy) Stefano D'Agostino (Italy) Federico Iannaccone (Italy) Gabriele Crivellaro
July 21	Segrate, Italy; Clay; M15; Singles and doubles draws	(Italy) Jacopo Bilardo (Italy) Niccolò Ciavarella; 5–7, 7–6^{(7–4)}, [11–9]	(Italy) Riccardo Perin (Italy) Lorenzo Sciahbasi	(Italy) Manuel Mazza (Italy) Lorenzo Carboni	(France) Lilian Marmousez (Italy) Stefano D'Agostino (Italy) Federico Iannaccone (Italy) Gabriele Crivellaro
July 21	Kuršumlijska Banja, Serbia; Clay; M15; Singles and doubles draws	(Bosnia and Herzegovina) Mirza Bašić; 6–4, 6–2	(Italy) Tommaso Compagnucci	(Ukraine) Nikita Bilozertsev; Andrey Chepelev	(Italy) Marcello Serafini (Belgium) Nicolas Ifi (Israel) Amit Vales (Cyprus) Andreas Timini
July 21	Kuršumlijska Banja, Serbia; Clay; M15; Singles and doubles draws	(Bosnia and Herzegovina) Mirza Bašić (Bosnia and Herzegovina) Vladan Tadić; 7–6^{(9–7)}, 7–6^{(8–6)}	(Cyprus) Eleftherios Neos; Semen Pankin	(Ukraine) Nikita Bilozertsev; Andrey Chepelev	(Italy) Marcello Serafini (Belgium) Nicolas Ifi (Israel) Amit Vales (Cyprus) Andreas Timini
July 21	Monastir, Tunisia; Hard; M15; Singles and doubles draws	(United States) Mwendwa Mbithi; 5–7, 6–1, 6–2	(Japan) Ryo Tabata	(Estonia) Markus Mölder (United States) James Hopper	(Spain) Albert Pedrico Kravtsov (Spain) Julian Alonso (Morocco) Yassine Dlimi (Tunisia) Aziz Ouakaa
July 21	Monastir, Tunisia; Hard; M15; Singles and doubles draws	(Estonia) Markus Mölder (Estonia) Siim Troost; 7–5, 6–4	Igor Kudriashov; Dmitrii Vasilev	(Estonia) Markus Mölder (United States) James Hopper	(Spain) Albert Pedrico Kravtsov (Spain) Julian Alonso (Morocco) Yassine Dlimi (Tunisia) Aziz Ouakaa
July 21	Santa Tecla, El Salvador; Hard; M15; Singles and doubles draws	(Italy) Pietro Orlando Fellin; 7–6^{(7–5)}, 6–2	(France) Guillaume Dalmasso	(United States) Daniel Milavsky (Venezuela) Ricardo Rodríguez-Pace	(Mexico) Alan Fernando Rubio Fierros (United States) Victor Lilov (United States) Noah Schachter (Brazil) Paulo André Saraiva dos Santos
July 21	Santa Tecla, El Salvador; Hard; M15; Singles and doubles draws	(Venezuela) Juan José Bianchi (United States) Daniel Milavsky; 6–4, 6–2	(El Salvador) Cesar Cruz (El Salvador) Diego Duran	(United States) Daniel Milavsky (Venezuela) Ricardo Rodríguez-Pace	(Mexico) Alan Fernando Rubio Fierros (United States) Victor Lilov (United States) Noah Schachter (Brazil) Paulo André Saraiva dos Santos
July 21	Santiago, Chile; Clay; M15; Singles and doubles draws	(Argentina) Guido Iván Justo; 6–0, 6–4	(Argentina) Lucio Ratti	(Chile) Daniel Antonio Núñez (Argentina) Carlos María Zárate	(Argentina) Fernando Cavallo (Argentina) Nicolás García Longo (Uruguay) Joaquín Aguilar Cardozo (Chile) Ignacio Antonio Becerra Otárola
July 21	Santiago, Chile; Clay; M15; Singles and doubles draws	(Uruguay) Joaquín Aguilar Cardozo (Argentina) Máximo Zeitune; 6–4, 7–6^{(7–3)}	(Chile) Nicolás Bruna (Argentina) Manuel Mouilleron Salvo	(Chile) Daniel Antonio Núñez (Argentina) Carlos María Zárate	(Argentina) Fernando Cavallo (Argentina) Nicolás García Longo (Uruguay) Joaquín Aguilar Cardozo (Chile) Ignacio Antonio Becerra Otárola
July 28	Bolzano, Italy; Clay; M25; Singles and doubles draws	(Italy) Andrea Picchione; 7–6^{(7–2)}, 6–3	(Italy) Gabriele Pennaforti	(Austria) Sandro Kopp (Italy) Alexander Weis	(Slovenia) Filip Jeff Planinšek (Turkey) Ergi Kırkın (France) Lilian Marmousez (Italy) Giovanni Oradini
July 28	Bolzano, Italy; Clay; M25; Singles and doubles draws	(Netherlands) Jarno Jans (Turkey) Ergi Kırkın; 7–6^{(7–5)}, 6–0	(Italy) Lorenzo Lorusso (Italy) Giulio Perego	(Austria) Sandro Kopp (Italy) Alexander Weis	(Slovenia) Filip Jeff Planinšek (Turkey) Ergi Kırkın (France) Lilian Marmousez (Italy) Giovanni Oradini
July 28	Wetzlar, Germany; Clay; M25; Singles and doubles draws	(Italy) Gabriele Piraino; 2–6, 6–2, 7–6^{(10–8)}	(France) Raphael Perot	(Romania) Cezar Crețu (Czech Republic) Daniel Siniakov	(Brazil) Daniel Dutra da Silva (Spain) Imanol López Morillo (Italy) Fabrizio Andaloro (Netherlands) Jelle Sels
July 28	Wetzlar, Germany; Clay; M25; Singles and doubles draws	(Romania) Cezar Crețu (Czech Republic) Štěpán Pecák; 6–4, 6–4	(Germany) Jannik Opitz (Germany) Tom Zeuch	(Romania) Cezar Crețu (Czech Republic) Daniel Siniakov	(Brazil) Daniel Dutra da Silva (Spain) Imanol López Morillo (Italy) Fabrizio Andaloro (Netherlands) Jelle Sels
July 28	Gentofte, Denmark; Clay; M25; Singles and doubles draws	(Greece) Aristotelis Thanos; 4–6, 6–4, 6–3	(Argentina) Hernán Casanova	(United Kingdom) Toby Samuel (Dominican Republic) Nick Hardt	(Netherlands) Michiel de Krom (France) Maxime Janvier (Denmark) Christian Sigsgaard (Ukraine) Eric Vanshelboim
July 28	Gentofte, Denmark; Clay; M25; Singles and doubles draws	(Denmark) Christian Sigsgaard (Denmark) Gustav Theilgaard; 6–4, 6–3	(Denmark) Benjamin Hannestad (Denmark) Sebastian Grundtvig Jørgensen	(United Kingdom) Toby Samuel (Dominican Republic) Nick Hardt	(Netherlands) Michiel de Krom (France) Maxime Janvier (Denmark) Christian Sigsgaard (Ukraine) Eric Vanshelboim
July 28	Koszalin, Poland; Clay; M25; Singles and doubles draws	(Poland) Maks Kaśnikowski; 6–1, 4–6, 6–4	(Poland) Tomasz Berkieta	Alexey Vatutin (Germany) Rudolf Molleker	(Poland) Paweł Juszczak (Italy) Federico Bondioli (Czech Republic) Zdeněk Kolář (South Africa) Alec Beckley
July 28	Koszalin, Poland; Clay; M25; Singles and doubles draws	(South Africa) Alec Beckley (Ukraine) Nikita Mashtakov; 6–4, 6–2	(United Kingdom) Joel Pierleoni (United Kingdom) Harry Rock	Alexey Vatutin (Germany) Rudolf Molleker	(Poland) Paweł Juszczak (Italy) Federico Bondioli (Czech Republic) Zdeněk Kolář (South Africa) Alec Beckley
July 28	Pitești, Romania; Clay; M25; Singles and doubles draws	(Romania) Gabi Adrian Boitan; 7–6^{(7–1)}, 6–3	(Uruguay) Franco Roncadelli	(Ukraine) Oleksandr Ovcharenko (Romania) Radu Mihai Papoe	(Italy) Carlo Alberto Caniato (Romania) Mihai Răzvan Marinescu (Romania) Ioan Alexandru Chiriță (Italy) Gianluca Cadenasso
July 28	Pitești, Romania; Clay; M25; Singles and doubles draws	(Uruguay) Franco Roncadelli (Moldova) Ilya Snițari; 6–4, 6–4	(Italy) Gianluca Cadenasso (Italy) Niccolò Catini	(Ukraine) Oleksandr Ovcharenko (Romania) Radu Mihai Papoe	(Italy) Carlo Alberto Caniato (Romania) Mihai Răzvan Marinescu (Romania) Ioan Alexandru Chiriță (Italy) Gianluca Cadenasso
July 28	Brazzaville, Congo; Clay; M25; Singles and doubles draws	(France) Florent Bax; 6–3, 6–3	(Slovenia) Bor Artnak	(India) Dev Javia (Tunisia) Aziz Ouakaa	(India) Digvijaypratap Singh (Morocco) Reda Bennani (Lithuania) Matas Vasiliauskas (France) Nicolas Jadoun
July 28	Brazzaville, Congo; Clay; M25; Singles and doubles draws	(France) Florent Bax (France) Paul Inchauspé; 6–2, 6–1	(Senegal) Seydina André (France) Nicolas Jadoun	(India) Dev Javia (Tunisia) Aziz Ouakaa	(India) Digvijaypratap Singh (Morocco) Reda Bennani (Lithuania) Matas Vasiliauskas (France) Nicolas Jadoun
July 28	Edwardsville, United States; Hard; M25; Singles and doubles draws	(United States) Kyle Kang; 3–6, 6–1, 6–1	(United Kingdom) Aidan McHugh	(United States) Aidan Kim (Serbia) Marko Miladinović	(United States) Tyler Zink (United States) Nicolas Ian Kotzen (South Africa) Siphosothando Montsi (United States) Evan Bynoe
July 28	Edwardsville, United States; Hard; M25; Singles and doubles draws	(United States) Kyle Kang (United States) Alexander Razeghi; 6–7^{(6–8)}, 7–5, [10–8]	(United States) Spencer Johnson (United States) Nicolas Ian Kotzen	(United States) Aidan Kim (Serbia) Marko Miladinović	(United States) Tyler Zink (United States) Nicolas Ian Kotzen (South Africa) Siphosothando Montsi (United States) Evan Bynoe
July 28	Wuning, China; Hard; M15; Singles and doubles draws	(South Korea) Lee Duck-hee; 6–3, 6–3	(Japan) Yuta Kikuchi	(Japan) Daisuke Sumizawa (Chinese Taipei) Lee Kuan-yi	(China) Zhang Tianhui; Timofei Derepasko (China) Jin Yuquan (China) Lu Pengyu
July 28	Wuning, China; Hard; M15; Singles and doubles draws	(China) Yang Zijiang (China) Zeng Yaojie; 6–3, 6–3	(Chinese Taipei) Hou Chun-chien (Chinese Taipei) Lee Kuan-yi	(Japan) Daisuke Sumizawa (Chinese Taipei) Lee Kuan-yi	(China) Zhang Tianhui; Timofei Derepasko (China) Jin Yuquan (China) Lu Pengyu
July 28	Nakhon Pathom, Thailand; Hard; M15; Singles and doubles draws	(South Korea) Kwon Soon-woo; 6–2, 6–2	(Japan) Kaichi Uchida	(Thailand) Kasidit Samrej (Australia) Jake Delaney	(Thailand) Pawit Sornlaksup (Thailand) Thantub Suksumrarn (India) Sidharth Rawat (Thailand) Congsup Congcar
July 28	Nakhon Pathom, Thailand; Hard; M15; Singles and doubles draws	(South Korea) Chung Yun-seong (South Korea) Kwon Soon-woo; 6–4, 6–4	(Thailand) Siwanat Auytayakul (Thailand) Thantub Suksumrarn	(Thailand) Kasidit Samrej (Australia) Jake Delaney	(Thailand) Pawit Sornlaksup (Thailand) Thantub Suksumrarn (India) Sidharth Rawat (Thailand) Congsup Congcar
July 28	Bali, Indonesia; Hard; M15; Singles and doubles draws	(United Kingdom) Max Basing; 6–0, 7–5	(Australia) Matthew Dellavedova	(Australia) Philip Sekulic (United States) Azuma Visaya	(United States) Michael Zhu (New Zealand) Alexander Klintcharov (Japan) Koki Matsuda (Japan) Yuto Oki
July 28	Bali, Indonesia; Hard; M15; Singles and doubles draws	(Japan) Koki Matsuda (Japan) Issei Okamura; 6–4, 7–6^{(7–5)}	(Indonesia) Renaldi Aqila Salim (Indonesia) Gunawan Trismuwantara	(Australia) Philip Sekulic (United States) Azuma Visaya	(United States) Michael Zhu (New Zealand) Alexander Klintcharov (Japan) Koki Matsuda (Japan) Yuto Oki
July 28	Kuršumlijska Banja, Serbia; Clay; M15; Singles and doubles draws	(Italy) Tommaso Compagnucci; 6–2, 6–4	Svyatoslav Gulin	(France) Alexandre Aubriot (Argentina) Lorenzo Gagliardo	(North Macedonia) Kalin Ivanovski; Denis Klok (Serbia) Branko Đurić; Andrey Chepelev
July 28	Kuršumlijska Banja, Serbia; Clay; M15; Singles and doubles draws	Semen Pankin (Serbia) Aleksa Pisarić; 6–3, 6–2	(France) Marko Maric (Serbia) Novak Novaković	(France) Alexandre Aubriot (Argentina) Lorenzo Gagliardo	(North Macedonia) Kalin Ivanovski; Denis Klok (Serbia) Branko Đurić; Andrey Chepelev
July 28	Wels, Austria; Clay; M15; Singles and doubles draws	(Italy) Michele Ribecai; 4–6, 6–3, 6–2	(Netherlands) Stijn Slump	(Italy) Lorenzo Sciahbasi (Germany) Marlon Vankan	(France) Sean Cuenin (Germany) Michel Hopp (France) Amaury Raynel (Ukraine) Glib Sekachov
July 28	Wels, Austria; Clay; M15; Singles and doubles draws	(Italy) Jacopo Bilardo (Italy) Lorenzo Sciahbasi; 6–0, 6–2	(Mexico) Rodrigo Alujas (France) Lucas Marionneau	(Italy) Lorenzo Sciahbasi (Germany) Marlon Vankan	(France) Sean Cuenin (Germany) Michel Hopp (France) Amaury Raynel (Ukraine) Glib Sekachov
July 28	Dublin, Ireland; Carpet; M15; Singles and doubles draws	(United Kingdom) Alastair Gray; 2–6, 6–4, 7–5	(Republic of Ireland) Michael Agwi	(United Kingdom) James Story (United Kingdom) Hamish Stewart	(United Kingdom) Oscar Weightman (United Kingdom) William Jansen (Greece) Pavlos Tsitsipas (Netherlands) Brian Bozemoj
July 28	Dublin, Ireland; Carpet; M15; Singles and doubles draws	(United Kingdom) Finn Bass (United Kingdom) Ben Jones; 6–4, 7–6^{(8–6)}	(United Kingdom) Alastair Gray (United Kingdom) Hamish Stewart	(United Kingdom) James Story (United Kingdom) Hamish Stewart	(United Kingdom) Oscar Weightman (United Kingdom) William Jansen (Greece) Pavlos Tsitsipas (Netherlands) Brian Bozemoj
July 28	Xàtiva, Spain; Clay; M15; Singles and doubles draws	(Spain) Alejandro Manzanera Pertusa; 6–4, 6–4	(Spain) Pablo Martínez Gómez	(Spain) Mario Martínez Serrano (Spain) Pedro Ródenas	(United States) Tristan McCormick (Spain) Alejandro Juan Mano (Spain) Diego Augusto Barreto Sánchez (Spain) Oscar Jose Gutierrez
July 28	Xàtiva, Spain; Clay; M15; Singles and doubles draws	(Latvia) Artūrs Žagars (Kazakhstan) Damir Zhalgasbay; 6–2, 6–1	(Switzerland) Adrien Burdet (Mexico) Alan Raúl Sau Franco	(Spain) Mario Martínez Serrano (Spain) Pedro Ródenas	(United States) Tristan McCormick (Spain) Alejandro Juan Mano (Spain) Diego Augusto Barreto Sánchez (Spain) Oscar Jose Gutierrez
July 28	Monastir, Tunisia; Hard; M15; Singles and doubles draws	(France) Maxence Bertimon; 3–6, 6–3, 6–2	Igor Kudriashov	(France) Yanis Ghazouani Durand (Spain) Albert Pedrico Kravtsov	(Algeria) Samir Hamza Reguig (France) Nicolas Tepmahc (United States) Mwendwa Mbithi (France) Enzo Wallart
July 28	Monastir, Tunisia; Hard; M15; Singles and doubles draws	(Spain) Alejandro Melero Kretzer (Spain) Albert Pedrico Kravtsov; 5–7, 6–3, [10–7]	(Tunisia) Adam Nagoudi (Algeria) Toufik Sahtali	(France) Yanis Ghazouani Durand (Spain) Albert Pedrico Kravtsov	(Algeria) Samir Hamza Reguig (France) Nicolas Tepmahc (United States) Mwendwa Mbithi (France) Enzo Wallart
July 28	Joinville, Brazil; Clay (i); M15; Singles and doubles draws	(Brazil) Igor Gimenez; 6–3, 7–5	(Brazil) Luís Felipe Miguel	(Mexico) Luis Carlos Álvarez (Brazil) Enzo Kohlmann de Freitas	(Brazil) Bruno Fernandez (Brazil) Gustavo Ribeiro de Almeida (Brazil) João Victor Couto Loureiro (Brazil) José Pereira
July 28	Joinville, Brazil; Clay (i); M15; Singles and doubles draws	(Brazil) Luís Felipe Miguel (Brazil) Luis Guto Miguel; 6–2, 6–4	(Brazil) Ryan Augusto dos Santos (Brazil) Natan Rodrigues	(Mexico) Luis Carlos Álvarez (Brazil) Enzo Kohlmann de Freitas	(Brazil) Bruno Fernandez (Brazil) Gustavo Ribeiro de Almeida (Brazil) João Victor Couto Loureiro (Brazil) José Pereira
July 28	Santiago, Chile; Clay; M15; Singles and doubles draws	(Argentina) Lorenzo Joaquín Rodríguez; 7–5, 6–1	(Argentina) Máximo Zeitune	(Argentina) Fernando Cavallo (Uruguay) Joaquín Aguilar Cardozo	(Chile) Benjamín Torrealba (Argentina) Ignacio Monzón (Argentina) Leonardo Aboian (Argentina) Lucio Ratti
July 28	Santiago, Chile; Clay; M15; Singles and doubles draws	(Argentina) Leonardo Aboian (Argentina) Ignacio Monzón; 7–6^{(7–4)}, 7–5	(Argentina) Tomás Martinez (Argentina) Mateo Matulovich	(Argentina) Fernando Cavallo (Uruguay) Joaquín Aguilar Cardozo	(Chile) Benjamín Torrealba (Argentina) Ignacio Monzón (Argentina) Leonardo Aboian (Argentina) Lucio Ratti

=== August ===
Week of	Tournament	Winner	Runners-up	Semifinalists	Quarterfinalists
August 4	Bali, Indonesia; Hard; M25; Singles and doubles draws	(France) Arthur Géa; 6–3, 3–6, 7–5	(Turkey) Yankı Erel	(Australia) Philip Sekulic (India) Mukund Sasikumar	(Japan) Yusuke Takahashi (Sweden) Leo Borg (Ukraine) Yurii Dzhavakian (United States) Alexander Chang
August 4	Bali, Indonesia; Hard; M25; Singles and doubles draws	(Japan) Yusuke Kusuhara (Japan) Shunsuke Nakagawa; 6–3, 6–0	(Ecuador) Patricio Alvarado (Japan) Koki Matsuda	(Australia) Philip Sekulic (India) Mukund Sasikumar	(Japan) Yusuke Takahashi (Sweden) Leo Borg (Ukraine) Yurii Dzhavakian (United States) Alexander Chang
August 4	Roehampton, United Kingdom; Hard; M25; Singles and doubles draws	(United Kingdom) Oliver Tarvet; 4–6, 7–5, 6–1	(United Kingdom) Paul Jubb	(United Kingdom) Henry Searle (United Kingdom) James Story	(Australia) Blake Mott (United Kingdom) Harry Wendelken (United Kingdom) Oscar Weightman (United Kingdom) Ben Jones
August 4	Roehampton, United Kingdom; Hard; M25; Singles and doubles draws	(United Kingdom) James MacKinlay (United Kingdom) Connor Thomson; 7–5, 5–7, [10–7]	(United Kingdom) James Story (United Kingdom) Matthew Summers	(United Kingdom) Henry Searle (United Kingdom) James Story	(Australia) Blake Mott (United Kingdom) Harry Wendelken (United Kingdom) Oscar Weightman (United Kingdom) Ben Jones
August 4	Tauste, Spain; Hard; M25+H; Singles and doubles draws	(Spain) Sergio Callejón Hernando; 7–5, 2–6, 6–1	Pavel Lagutin	(Spain) Mario González Fernández (Spain) Albert Pedrico Kravtsov	(United States) Maxwell McKennon (China) Te Rigele (France) Yanis Ghazouani Durand; Nikolay Vylegzhanin
August 4	Tauste, Spain; Hard; M25+H; Singles and doubles draws	(Venezuela) Juan José Bianchi (United States) Daniel Milavsky; 7–5, 6–1	(United States) Tristan McCormick (United States) Maxwell McKennon	(Spain) Mario González Fernández (Spain) Albert Pedrico Kravtsov	(United States) Maxwell McKennon (China) Te Rigele (France) Yanis Ghazouani Durand; Nikolay Vylegzhanin
August 4	Montesilvano, Italy; Clay; M25; Singles and doubles draws	(Italy) Andrea Picchione; 6–0, 7–5	(Turkey) Ergi Kırkın	(Italy) Leonardo Primucci (Italy) Facundo Juárez	(Italy) Daniel Bagnolini (Italy) Gabriele Vulpitta (Italy) Daniele Rapagnetta (Italy) Lorenzo Sciahbasi
August 4	Montesilvano, Italy; Clay; M25; Singles and doubles draws	(Italy) Fausto Tabacco (Italy) Giorgio Tabacco; 6–1, 6–4	(Italy) Facundo Juárez (Italy) Lorenzo Lorusso	(Italy) Leonardo Primucci (Italy) Facundo Juárez	(Italy) Daniel Bagnolini (Italy) Gabriele Vulpitta (Italy) Daniele Rapagnetta (Italy) Lorenzo Sciahbasi
August 4	Monastir, Tunisia; Hard; M25; Singles and doubles draws	(Tunisia) Moez Echargui; 6–3, 6–4	(France) Dan Added	(Slovakia) Lukáš Pokorný (France) Robin Bertrand	Igor Kudriashov; Daniil Ostapenkov (France) Maxence Bertimon (India) Manas Dhamne
August 4	Monastir, Tunisia; Hard; M25; Singles and doubles draws	(France) Dan Added (Slovakia) Lukáš Pokorný; 6–2, 7–5	(United States) Sekou Bangoura (Ghana) Isaac Nortey	(Slovakia) Lukáš Pokorný (France) Robin Bertrand	Igor Kudriashov; Daniil Ostapenkov (France) Maxence Bertimon (India) Manas Dhamne
August 4	Brazzaville, Congo; Clay; M25; Singles and doubles draws	(France) Florent Bax; 6–3, 6–7^{(5–7)}, 7–6^{(8–6)}	(Slovenia) Bor Artnak	(Morocco) Reda Bennani (Poland) Kacper Szymkowiak	(France) Nicolas Jadoun (Tunisia) Aziz Ouakaa (Netherlands) Laurence Teunissen (India) Digvijaypratap Singh
August 4	Brazzaville, Congo; Clay; M25; Singles and doubles draws	(France) Constantin Bittoun Kouzmine (Tunisia) Aziz Ouakaa; 6–7^{(6–8)}, 7–6^{(9–7)}, [10–5]	(Poland) Kacper Szymkowiak (Poland) Jan Wygona	(Morocco) Reda Bennani (Poland) Kacper Szymkowiak	(France) Nicolas Jadoun (Tunisia) Aziz Ouakaa (Netherlands) Laurence Teunissen (India) Digvijaypratap Singh
August 4	Southaven, United States; Hard; M25; Singles and doubles draws	(United States) Emon van Loben Sels; 6–4, 6–3	(United States) Ryan Fishback	(United States) Strong Kirchheimer (United States) Kaylan Bigun	(Canada) Benjamin Thomas George (United States) Nicolas Ian Kotzen (France) Mathis Bondaz (United States) Ryan Dickerson
August 4	Southaven, United States; Hard; M25; Singles and doubles draws	(Mexico) Alan Magadán (United States) Karl Poling; 6–0, 6–4	(United States) Jack Anthrop (United States) Alafia Ayeni	(United States) Strong Kirchheimer (United States) Kaylan Bigun	(Canada) Benjamin Thomas George (United States) Nicolas Ian Kotzen (France) Mathis Bondaz (United States) Ryan Dickerson
August 4	Brisbane, Australia; Hard; M15; Singles and doubles draws	(Australia) Dane Sweeny; Walkover	(Australia) Derek Pham	(Japan) Hikaru Shiraishi (Australia) Jeremy Jin	(Australia) Pavle Marinkov (Australia) Enzo Aguiard (Australia) Tai Sach (Australia) Jesse Delaney
August 4	Brisbane, Australia; Hard; M15; Singles and doubles draws	(Australia) Zachary Viiala (Australia) Hugh Winter; 6–3, 6–4	(Australia) Ethan Cook (Australia) Tai Sach	(Japan) Hikaru Shiraishi (Australia) Jeremy Jin	(Australia) Pavle Marinkov (Australia) Enzo Aguiard (Australia) Tai Sach (Australia) Jesse Delaney
August 4	Singapore, Singapore; Hard (i); M15; Singles and doubles draws	(Thailand) Kasidit Samrej; 6–1, 5–7, 6–2	(Japan) Sora Fukuda	(Japan) Keisuke Saitoh (Japan) Shu Matsuoka	(Greece) Markos Kalovelonis (United Kingdom) Ali Habib (Japan) Shintaro Imai (Poland) Filip Peliwo
August 4	Singapore, Singapore; Hard (i); M15; Singles and doubles draws	(Japan) Sora Fukuda (Japan) Yuhei Kono; 7–6^{(7–2)}, 7–6^{(7–1)}	(Thailand) Yuttana Charoenphon (Thailand) Kasidit Samrej	(Japan) Keisuke Saitoh (Japan) Shu Matsuoka	(Greece) Markos Kalovelonis (United Kingdom) Ali Habib (Japan) Shintaro Imai (Poland) Filip Peliwo
August 4	Wuning, China; Hard; M15; Singles and doubles draws	(Japan) Yuta Kikuchi; 6–1, 6–4	(China) Sun Qian	(China) Mo Yecong (Australia) Edward Winter	(South Korea) Shin Sanhui (China) Pan Weiwen (Chinese Taipei) Lee Kuan-yi (China) Wang Xiaofei
August 4	Wuning, China; Hard; M15; Singles and doubles draws	(Australia) Chase Ferguson (China) Yang Mingyuan; 6–7^{(6–8)}, 7–6^{(7–1)}, [10–6]	(Japan) Yuichiro Inui (Japan) Makoto Ochi	(China) Mo Yecong (Australia) Edward Winter	(South Korea) Shin Sanhui (China) Pan Weiwen (Chinese Taipei) Lee Kuan-yi (China) Wang Xiaofei
August 4	Astana, Kazakhstan; Hard; M15; Singles and doubles draws	Petr Bar Biryukov; 6–4, 7–6^{(9–7)}	Egor Gerasimov	Martin Borisiouk; Erik Arutiunian	(Georgia (country)) Saba Purtseladze (Turkey) Mert Alkaya; Maxim Zhukov (Malaysia) Mitsuki Wei Kang Leong
August 4	Astana, Kazakhstan; Hard; M15; Singles and doubles draws	(Malaysia) Mitsuki Wei Kang Leong (Czech Republic) Dominik Palán; 6–0, 6–2	(Uzbekistan) Damir Abdusamadov (Uzbekistan) Amir Milushev	Martin Borisiouk; Erik Arutiunian	(Georgia (country)) Saba Purtseladze (Turkey) Mert Alkaya; Maxim Zhukov (Malaysia) Mitsuki Wei Kang Leong
August 4	Eupen, Belgium; Clay; M15; Singles and doubles draws	(Belgium) Émilien Demanet; 7–5, 7–5	(Poland) Marcel Zieliński	(Belgium) Niels Ratiu (Belgium) Simon Beaupain	(France) Arthur Nagel (Lebanon) Fadi Bidan (France) Adrien Gobat (Netherlands) Niels Visker
August 4	Eupen, Belgium; Clay; M15; Singles and doubles draws	(Belgium) Émilien Demanet (Belgium) Niels Ratiu; 6–2, 3–6, [18–16]	(Netherlands) Dax Donders (Netherlands) Niels Visker	(Belgium) Niels Ratiu (Belgium) Simon Beaupain	(France) Arthur Nagel (Lebanon) Fadi Bidan (France) Adrien Gobat (Netherlands) Niels Visker
August 4	Frankfurt, Germany; Clay; M15; Singles and doubles draws	(France) Lilian Marmousez; 4–6, 6–2, 6–4	(Germany) Adrian Oetzbach	(Ukraine) Vladyslav Orlov (Czech Republic) Dominik Reček	(France) Adan Freire da Silva (Germany) Neo Niedner (Germany) Vincent Marysko (Germany) Nikolai Barsukov
August 4	Frankfurt, Germany; Clay; M15; Singles and doubles draws	(Netherlands) Abel Forger (Netherlands) Elgin Khoeblal; 7–6^{(7–5)}, 6–4	(France) Sven Corbinais (France) Adan Freire da Silva	(Ukraine) Vladyslav Orlov (Czech Republic) Dominik Reček	(France) Adan Freire da Silva (Germany) Neo Niedner (Germany) Vincent Marysko (Germany) Nikolai Barsukov
August 4	Slovenska Bistrica, Slovenia; Clay; M15; Singles and doubles draws	(Italy) Juan Cruz Martin Manzano; 6–4, 6–7^{(3–7)}, 4–1 ret.	(Czech Republic) Jan Kumstát	(Italy) Andrea Fiorentini (Greece) Dimitris Sakellaridis	(Slovakia) Radovan Michalik (Germany) Marlon Vankan (Austria) Gregor Ramskogler (Hungary) Attila Boros
August 4	Slovenska Bistrica, Slovenia; Clay; M15; Singles and doubles draws	(Luxembourg) Louis Van Herck (Germany) Marlon Vankan; 0–6, 6–3, [10–3]	(Chinese Taipei) Jeffrey Hsu (Greece) Dimitris Sakellaridis	(Italy) Andrea Fiorentini (Greece) Dimitris Sakellaridis	(Slovakia) Radovan Michalik (Germany) Marlon Vankan (Austria) Gregor Ramskogler (Hungary) Attila Boros
August 4	Kuršumlijska Banja, Serbia; Clay; M15; Singles and doubles draws	Andrey Chepelev; 6–1, 6–4	(Serbia) Dušan Obradović	(Morocco) Younes Lalami Laaroussi (Serbia) Zoran Ludoški	(Serbia) Branko Đurić (Iran) Ali Yazdani (Serbia) Kristijan Juhas; Denis Klok
August 4	Kuršumlijska Banja, Serbia; Clay; M15; Singles and doubles draws	(Croatia) Admir Kalender; Pavel Verbin; 6–3, 6–4	(Serbia) Zoran Ludoški (Serbia) Novak Novaković	(Morocco) Younes Lalami Laaroussi (Serbia) Zoran Ludoški	(Serbia) Branko Đurić (Iran) Ali Yazdani (Serbia) Kristijan Juhas; Denis Klok
August 4	Curtea de Argeș, Romania; Clay; M15; Singles and doubles draws	(Romania) Radu David Țurcanu; 6–4, 4–6, 6–1	(Romania) Radu Mihai Papoe	(Romania) Ștefan Paloși (Italy) Edoardo Cherie Ligniere	(Romania) Nicholas David Ionel (Italy) Giannicola Misasi (Italy) Samuele Pieri (Italy) Lorenzo Rottoli
August 4	Curtea de Argeș, Romania; Clay; M15; Singles and doubles draws	(Romania) Dragoș Nicolae Cazacu (Romania) Alexandru Cristian Dumitru; 4–6, 6–4, [10–7]	(United Kingdom) Jeremy Gschwendtner (Italy) Alessandro Spadola	(Romania) Ștefan Paloși (Italy) Edoardo Cherie Ligniere	(Romania) Nicholas David Ionel (Italy) Giannicola Misasi (Italy) Samuele Pieri (Italy) Lorenzo Rottoli
August 4	Sofia, Bulgaria; Clay; M15; Singles and doubles draws	(France) Thomas Faurel; 7–5, 6–0	(Bulgaria) Alexander Vasilev	(Italy) Michele Ribecai (Ukraine) Nikita Mashtakov	(France) Alexandre Aubriot (France) Benjamin Pietri (Bulgaria) Anas Mazdrashki (France) Sean Cuenin
August 4	Sofia, Bulgaria; Clay; M15; Singles and doubles draws	(Italy) Jacopo Bilardo (Italy) Niccolò Ciavarella; 6–4, 6–4	(Bulgaria) Viktor Markov (Bulgaria) Plamen Milushev	(Italy) Michele Ribecai (Ukraine) Nikita Mashtakov	(France) Alexandre Aubriot (France) Benjamin Pietri (Bulgaria) Anas Mazdrashki (France) Sean Cuenin
August 11	Bali, Indonesia; Hard; M25; Singles and doubles draws	(France) Arthur Géa; 6–1, 6–2	(Australia) Philip Sekulic	(India) Sidharth Rawat (Japan) Renta Tokuda	(Australia) Matthew Dellavedova (Turkey) Yankı Erel (Japan) Yusuke Takahashi (India) Mukund Sasikumar
August 11	Bali, Indonesia; Hard; M25; Singles and doubles draws	(Japan) Kokoro Isomura (Japan) Shunsuke Nakagawa; 6–2, 6–2	(New Zealand) Alexander Klintcharov (New Zealand) Ajeet Rai	(India) Sidharth Rawat (Japan) Renta Tokuda	(Australia) Matthew Dellavedova (Turkey) Yankı Erel (Japan) Yusuke Takahashi (India) Mukund Sasikumar
August 11	Yinchuan, China; Hard; M25; Singles and doubles draws	(Australia) Akira Santillan; 7–5, 6–3	(China) Zhang Tianhui	(South Korea) Shin Sanhui (South Korea) Shin Woobin	(China) Mo Yecong (China) Yang Xiaoyin (Japan) Takuya Kumasaka (China) Fnu Nidunjianzan
August 11	Yinchuan, China; Hard; M25; Singles and doubles draws	(China) Yang Zijiang (China) Zeng Yaojie; 7–6^{(7–5)}, 3–6, [10–3]	(Australia) Chase Ferguson (Japan) Shinji Hazawa	(South Korea) Shin Sanhui (South Korea) Shin Woobin	(China) Mo Yecong (China) Yang Xiaoyin (Japan) Takuya Kumasaka (China) Fnu Nidunjianzan
August 11	Idanha-a-Nova, Portugal; Hard; M25; Singles and doubles draws	(United States) Daniel Milavsky; 7–6^{(7–4)}, 6–4	(United States) Tristan McCormick	(Spain) Alberto Barroso Campos (United States) Andrew Fenty	(Australia) Marc Polmans (Portugal) Pedro Araújo (Belgium) Joris De Loore (United Kingdom) Hamish Stewart
August 11	Idanha-a-Nova, Portugal; Hard; M25; Singles and doubles draws	(Spain) Rafael Izquierdo Luque (Spain) Iván Marrero Curbelo; 6–0, 6–3	(Spain) Alberto Barroso Campos (Brazil) Bruno Oliveira	(Spain) Alberto Barroso Campos (United States) Andrew Fenty	(Australia) Marc Polmans (Portugal) Pedro Araújo (Belgium) Joris De Loore (United Kingdom) Hamish Stewart
August 11	Gijón, Spain; Clay; M25; Singles and doubles draws	(Italy) Lorenzo Giustino; 6–1, 7–5	(Spain) Pedro Vives Marcos	(Spain) Miguel Damas (Netherlands) Ryan Nijboer	(Spain) Sergi Pérez Contri (Netherlands) Michiel de Krom (Spain) Oscar Jose Gutierrez (Spain) Alejandro Moro Cañas
August 11	Gijón, Spain; Clay; M25; Singles and doubles draws	(Spain) Carles Córdoba (Spain) Andrés Santamarta Roig; 7–5, 3–6, [10–7]	(Spain) Pedro Vives Marcos (Spain) Benjamín Winter López	(Spain) Miguel Damas (Netherlands) Ryan Nijboer	(Spain) Sergi Pérez Contri (Netherlands) Michiel de Krom (Spain) Oscar Jose Gutierrez (Spain) Alejandro Moro Cañas
August 11	Aldershot, United Kingdom; Hard; M25; Singles and doubles draws	(United Kingdom) Paul Jubb; 7–6^{(7–4)}, 7–5	(United Kingdom) Toby Samuel	(United Kingdom) James Story (United Kingdom) Henry Searle	(United Kingdom) Lui Maxted (United Kingdom) Charles Broom (United Kingdom) Patrick Brady (United States) Nicholas Godsick
August 11	Aldershot, United Kingdom; Hard; M25; Singles and doubles draws	(United Kingdom) Lui Maxted (United Kingdom) Finn Murgett; 6–4, 7–6^{(8–6)}	(United Kingdom) James MacKinlay (United Kingdom) Connor Thomson	(United Kingdom) James Story (United Kingdom) Henry Searle	(United Kingdom) Lui Maxted (United Kingdom) Charles Broom (United Kingdom) Patrick Brady (United States) Nicholas Godsick
August 11	Koksijde, Belgium; Clay; M25; Singles and doubles draws	(France) Lilian Marmousez; 2–6, 6–2, 6–3	(Belgium) Gilles-Arnaud Bailly	(Czech Republic) Jonáš Forejtek (Germany) Henri Squire	(Belgium) Romain Faucon (Austria) Maximilian Neuchrist (Belgium) Jack Logé (Germany) Marvin Möller
August 11	Koksijde, Belgium; Clay; M25; Singles and doubles draws	(Netherlands) Elgin Khoeblal (Ukraine) Volodymyr Uzhylovskyi; 6–4, 2–6, [10–5]	(France) César Bouchelaghem (France) Pierre Antoine Tailleu	(Czech Republic) Jonáš Forejtek (Germany) Henri Squire	(Belgium) Romain Faucon (Austria) Maximilian Neuchrist (Belgium) Jack Logé (Germany) Marvin Möller
August 11	Monastir, Tunisia; Hard; M25; Singles and doubles draws	(France) Étienne Donnet; 6–3, 6–1	(Egypt) Fares Zakaria	(France) Cyril Vandermeersch; Daniil Ostapenkov	(India) Manas Dhamne (France) Robin Bertrand (Egypt) Michael Bassem Sobhy (Ivory Coast) Eliakim Coulibaly
August 11	Monastir, Tunisia; Hard; M25; Singles and doubles draws	(France) Étienne Donnet (France) Cyril Vandermeersch; 6–3, 6–7^{(7–9)}, [18–16]	(United States) Sekou Bangoura (France) Robin Bertrand	(France) Cyril Vandermeersch; Daniil Ostapenkov	(India) Manas Dhamne (France) Robin Bertrand (Egypt) Michael Bassem Sobhy (Ivory Coast) Eliakim Coulibaly
August 11	Brisbane, Australia; Hard; M15; Singles and doubles draws	(Australia) Dane Sweeny; 6–2, 6–2	(Australia) Jesse Delaney	(Australia) Pavle Marinkov (Australia) Hayden Jones	(Australia) Enzo Aguiard (Japan) Taiyo Yamanaka (Australia) Jack Bruce-Smith (Australia) Scott Jones
August 11	Brisbane, Australia; Hard; M15; Singles and doubles draws	(Australia) Ethan Cook (Australia) Tai Sach; 5–7, 6–2, [11–9]	(Australia) Cruz Hewitt (Turkey) Mustafa Ege Sik	(Australia) Pavle Marinkov (Australia) Hayden Jones	(Australia) Enzo Aguiard (Japan) Taiyo Yamanaka (Australia) Jack Bruce-Smith (Australia) Scott Jones
August 11	Singapore, Singapore; Hard (i); M15; Singles and doubles draws	(Thailand) Kasidit Samrej; 2–6, 7–5, 7–5	(Japan) Koki Matsuda	(Australia) Chen Dong (Poland) Filip Peliwo	(Poland) Marcel Kamrowski (Japan) Sora Fukuda (Japan) Kosuke Ogura (Italy) Niccolò Catini
August 11	Singapore, Singapore; Hard (i); M15; Singles and doubles draws	(South Korea) Kim Dong-ju (South Korea) Oh Chan-yeong; 6–3, 6–2	(Japan) Sora Fukuda (Japan) Yamato Sueoka	(Australia) Chen Dong (Poland) Filip Peliwo	(Poland) Marcel Kamrowski (Japan) Sora Fukuda (Japan) Kosuke Ogura (Italy) Niccolò Catini
August 11	Trier, Germany; Clay; M15; Singles and doubles draws	(Republic of Ireland) Michael Agwi; 7–5, 2–6, 6–3	(Germany) Adrian Oetzbach	(Germany) Tim Handel (Germany) Oscar Otte	(Brazil) Pedro Sakamoto (Germany) Kai Wehnelt (Germany) Sebastian Fanselow (Spain) Imanol López Morillo
August 11	Trier, Germany; Clay; M15; Singles and doubles draws	(Netherlands) Pieter De Lange (Netherlands) Abel Forger; 6–2, 6–3	(Germany) Vincent Marysko (United States) Christopher Papa	(Germany) Tim Handel (Germany) Oscar Otte	(Brazil) Pedro Sakamoto (Germany) Kai Wehnelt (Germany) Sebastian Fanselow (Spain) Imanol López Morillo
August 11	Ystad, Sweden; Clay; M15; Singles and doubles draws	(Germany) Tom Gentzsch; 6–3, 6–4	(Italy) Alexander Weis	(Germany) Marlon Vankan (Sweden) Nikola Slavic	(Italy) Lorenzo Bocchi (Sweden) John Hallquist Lithén (France) Felix Balshaw (Switzerland) Luca Staeheli
August 11	Ystad, Sweden; Clay; M15; Singles and doubles draws	(Sweden) Oliver Johansson (New Zealand) Anton Shepp; 6–0, 6–2	(Sweden) Nikola Slavic (Switzerland) Luca Staeheli	(Germany) Marlon Vankan (Sweden) Nikola Slavic	(Italy) Lorenzo Bocchi (Sweden) John Hallquist Lithén (France) Felix Balshaw (Switzerland) Luca Staeheli
August 11	Turku, Finland; Hard; M15; Singles and doubles draws	(United Kingdom) Oscar Weightman; 6–4, 3–6, 6–3	(Turkey) Mert Alkaya	(France) Louis Larue (United Kingdom) Finn Bass	(Germany) Louis Wessels (Norway) Andreja Petrovic (Ukraine) Glib Sekachov (Norway) Baltazar Wiger Nordas
August 11	Turku, Finland; Hard; M15; Singles and doubles draws	(United Kingdom) Emile Hudd (United Kingdom) Ben Jones; 7–6^{(7–1)}, 6–7^{(4–7)}, [10–7]	(United Kingdom) Finn Bass (United States) Oren Vasser	(France) Louis Larue (United Kingdom) Finn Bass	(Germany) Louis Wessels (Norway) Andreja Petrovic (Ukraine) Glib Sekachov (Norway) Baltazar Wiger Nordas
August 11	Bielsko-Biała, Poland; Clay; M15; Singles and doubles draws	(Ukraine) Viacheslav Bielinskyi; 6–2, 6–1	(Hungary) Péter Fajta	(South Africa) Alec Beckley (Ukraine) Vladyslav Orlov	(France) Antoni Fabre (Hungary) Máté Valkusz (Czech Republic) Jakub Filip (Brazil) Igor Gimenez
August 11	Bielsko-Biała, Poland; Clay; M15; Singles and doubles draws	(Poland) Karol Filar (Poland) Mikołaj Migdalski; 7–5, 4–6, [10–6]	(Poland) Jakub Jędrzejczak (Ukraine) Vladyslav Orlov	(South Africa) Alec Beckley (Ukraine) Vladyslav Orlov	(France) Antoni Fabre (Hungary) Máté Valkusz (Czech Republic) Jakub Filip (Brazil) Igor Gimenez
August 11	Târgu Jiu, Romania; Clay; M15; Singles and doubles draws	(Romania) Cezar Crețu; 6–2, 7–5	(Italy) Samuele Pieri	(Romania) Radu Mihai Papoe (Romania) Dan Alexandru Tomescu	(Italy) Vito dell'Elba (Romania) Ștefan Paloși (Romania) Cezar Gabriel Papoe (Italy) Denis Constantin Spiridon
August 11	Târgu Jiu, Romania; Clay; M15; Singles and doubles draws	(United Kingdom) Jeremy Gschwendtner (Italy) Alessandro Spadola; 4–6, 6–3, [10–7]	(Italy) Francesco Ferrari (Italy) Federico Valle	(Romania) Radu Mihai Papoe (Romania) Dan Alexandru Tomescu	(Italy) Vito dell'Elba (Romania) Ștefan Paloși (Romania) Cezar Gabriel Papoe (Italy) Denis Constantin Spiridon
August 11	Pirot, Serbia; Clay; M15; Singles and doubles draws	(Argentina) Juan Estévez; 6–3, 7–6^{(7–1)}	(Iran) Ali Yazdani	Denis Klok; Andrey Chepelev	(Lithuania) Pijus Vaitiekūnas (Italy) Samuele Seghetti (Italy) Giannicola Misasi (Serbia) Ognjen Milić
August 11	Pirot, Serbia; Clay; M15; Singles and doubles draws	(United Kingdom) James Hopper (United States) Aadarsh Tripathi; 6–4, 3–6, [13–11]	(United States) Evan Burnett (United States) Theodore Dean	Denis Klok; Andrey Chepelev	(Lithuania) Pijus Vaitiekūnas (Italy) Samuele Seghetti (Italy) Giannicola Misasi (Serbia) Ognjen Milić
August 11	Huntsville, United States; Clay; M15; Singles and doubles draws	(United Kingdom) Blu Baker; 6–7^{(3–7)}, 6–3, 6–4	(Serbia) Aleksa Ćirić	(United States) Evan Bynoe; Amirkhamza Nasridinov	(United States) William Grant (Argentina) Alexis Gurmendi (United States) Rudy Quan (United States) Ryan Dickerson
August 11	Huntsville, United States; Clay; M15; Singles and doubles draws	(United States) Braden Shick (United States) Matthew Thomson; 7–6^{(7–5)}, 7–6^{(7–5)}	(New Zealand) Reese Falck (New Zealand) Matthew Shearer	(United States) Evan Bynoe; Amirkhamza Nasridinov	(United States) William Grant (Argentina) Alexis Gurmendi (United States) Rudy Quan (United States) Ryan Dickerson
August 18	Taipei, Taiwan; Hard; M25; Singles and doubles draws	(Australia) Dane Sweeny; 6–2, 3–0 ret.	(South Korea) Kwon Soon-woo	(Japan) Renta Tokuda (Japan) Masamichi Imamura	(Chinese Taipei) Huang Tsung-hao (South Korea) Shin Woobin (Australia) Matthew Dellavedova (New Zealand) Ajeet Rai
August 18	Taipei, Taiwan; Hard; M25; Singles and doubles draws	(Chinese Taipei) Huang Tsung-hao (Japan) Taisei Ichikawa; 7–6^{(8–6)}, 4–6, [10–7]	(South Korea) Chung Yun-seong (South Korea) Kwon Soon-woo	(Japan) Renta Tokuda (Japan) Masamichi Imamura	(Chinese Taipei) Huang Tsung-hao (South Korea) Shin Woobin (Australia) Matthew Dellavedova (New Zealand) Ajeet Rai
August 18	Idanha-a-Nova, Portugal; Hard; M25; Singles and doubles draws	(France) Tom Paris; 6–3, 6–4	(United States) Andrew Fenty	(Belgium) Joris De Loore (Portugal) Tiago Cação	(Portugal) Pedro Araújo (Netherlands) Mees Röttgering (Portugal) Rodrigo Fernandes (Portugal) Hugo Maia
August 18	Idanha-a-Nova, Portugal; Hard; M25; Singles and doubles draws	(Portugal) Pedro Araújo (Portugal) Diogo Marques; 6–7^{(5–7)}, 6–3, [10–6]	(Spain) Alberto Barroso Campos (Brazil) Bruno Oliveira	(Belgium) Joris De Loore (Portugal) Tiago Cação	(Portugal) Pedro Araújo (Netherlands) Mees Röttgering (Portugal) Rodrigo Fernandes (Portugal) Hugo Maia
August 18	Santander, Spain; Clay; M25; Singles and doubles draws	(Spain) Javier Barranco Cosano; 6–3, 4–0 ret.	(Italy) Lorenzo Giustino	(Spain) Benjamín Winter López (Spain) Alejandro Moro Cañas	(Spain) Carlos Sánchez Jover (Spain) Sergi Pérez Contri (Netherlands) Ryan Nijboer (Spain) Andrés Santamarta Roig
August 18	Santander, Spain; Clay; M25; Singles and doubles draws	(Spain) Sergi Fita Juan (Spain) Carlos López Montagud; 2–6, 6–4, [10–8]	(Spain) Carlos Sánchez Jover (Spain) Pedro Vives Marcos	(Spain) Benjamín Winter López (Spain) Alejandro Moro Cañas	(Spain) Carlos Sánchez Jover (Spain) Sergi Pérez Contri (Netherlands) Ryan Nijboer (Spain) Andrés Santamarta Roig
August 18	Überlingen, Germany; Clay; M25; Singles and doubles draws	(Germany) Tom Gentzsch; 7–5, 6–4	(Netherlands) Max Houkes	(Czech Republic) Jonáš Forejtek (Germany) Oscar Otte	(Republic of Ireland) Michael Agwi (France) Arthur Nagel (Germany) Niklas Schell (Germany) Louis Wessels
August 18	Überlingen, Germany; Clay; M25; Singles and doubles draws	(Germany) Jannik Maute (Germany) Sydney Zick; 7–6^{(7–3)}, 6–7^{(4–7)}, [10–8]	(Germany) Niklas Schell (Germany) Louis Wessels	(Czech Republic) Jonáš Forejtek (Germany) Oscar Otte	(Republic of Ireland) Michael Agwi (France) Arthur Nagel (Germany) Niklas Schell (Germany) Louis Wessels
August 18	Muttenz, Switzerland; Clay; M25; Singles and doubles draws	(Switzerland) Henry Bernet; 7–5, 6–4	(Switzerland) Jeffrey von der Schulenburg	(Italy) Michele Ribecai (Switzerland) Johan Nikles	(France) Maxime Janvier (Germany) Kai Wehnelt (Italy) Carlo Alberto Caniato (Germany) Lucas Gerch
August 18	Muttenz, Switzerland; Clay; M25; Singles and doubles draws	(Republic of Ireland) Charles Barry (Germany) Lucas Gerch; 6–0, 6–4	(Switzerland) Adrien Burdet (Switzerland) Jeffrey von der Schulenburg	(Italy) Michele Ribecai (Switzerland) Johan Nikles	(France) Maxime Janvier (Germany) Kai Wehnelt (Italy) Carlo Alberto Caniato (Germany) Lucas Gerch
August 18	Lesa, Italy; Clay; M25; Singles and doubles draws	(Italy) Lorenzo Carboni; 6–3, 6–7^{(2–7)}, 6–2	(Switzerland) Rémy Bertola	(Ukraine) Oleksandr Ovcharenko (Argentina) Luciano Emanuel Ambrogi	(Italy) Giovanni Fonio (Italy) Juan Cruz Martin Manzano (Switzerland) Kilian Feldbausch (Italy) Francesco Forti
August 18	Lesa, Italy; Clay; M25; Singles and doubles draws	(Italy) Gianluca Cadenasso (Ukraine) Oleksandr Ovcharenko; 6–7^{(6–8)}, 6–3, [10–5]	(Italy) Francesco Forti (Italy) Giovanni Oradini	(Ukraine) Oleksandr Ovcharenko (Argentina) Luciano Emanuel Ambrogi	(Italy) Giovanni Fonio (Italy) Juan Cruz Martin Manzano (Switzerland) Kilian Feldbausch (Italy) Francesco Forti
August 18	Maribor, Slovenia; Clay; M25; Singles and doubles draws	(France) Sean Cuenin; 1–6, 6–2, 6–0	(Ukraine) Viacheslav Bielinskyi	(Austria) Sebastian Sorger (Bosnia and Herzegovina) Mirza Bašić	(Slovenia) Filip Jeff Planinšek (Slovenia) Bor Artnak (Serbia) Branko Đurić (Finland) Eero Vasa
August 18	Maribor, Slovenia; Clay; M25; Singles and doubles draws	(Finland) Patrick Kaukovalta (Finland) Eero Vasa; 7–5, 6–4	(Bosnia and Herzegovina) Mirza Bašić (Slovenia) Jan Kupčič	(Austria) Sebastian Sorger (Bosnia and Herzegovina) Mirza Bašić	(Slovenia) Filip Jeff Planinšek (Slovenia) Bor Artnak (Serbia) Branko Đurić (Finland) Eero Vasa
August 18	Ma'anshan, China; Hard (i); M15; Singles and doubles draws	Maxim Zhukov; 6–3, 6–4	(China) Wang Xiaofei	(South Korea) Shin Sanhui (Canada) Alvin Nicholas Tudorica	(China) Mo Yecong (China) Xiao Linang (South Korea) Cho Seong-woo (Italy) Niccolò Catini
August 18	Ma'anshan, China; Hard (i); M15; Singles and doubles draws	(South Korea) Nam Ji-sung (South Korea) Park Ui-sung; 6–3, 4–6, [10–7]	(South Korea) Cho Seong-woo (China) Yang Zijiang	(South Korea) Shin Sanhui (Canada) Alvin Nicholas Tudorica	(China) Mo Yecong (China) Xiao Linang (South Korea) Cho Seong-woo (Italy) Niccolò Catini
August 18	Nakhon Pathom, Thailand; Hard; M15; Singles and doubles draws	(India) Sidharth Rawat; 6–4, 6–2	(Thailand) Markus Malaszszak	(Thailand) Thantub Suksumrarn (New Zealand) Isaac Becroft	(Thailand) Yuttana Charoenphon (South Korea) Kim Dong-ju (United Kingdom) Max Basing (South Africa) Thando Longwe-Smit
August 18	Nakhon Pathom, Thailand; Hard; M15; Singles and doubles draws	(Thailand) Siwanat Auytayakul (Thailand) Markus Malaszszak; 6–4, 6–2	(Indonesia) Muhammad Rifqi Fitriadi (South Korea) Lee Jun-hyeon	(Thailand) Thantub Suksumrarn (New Zealand) Isaac Becroft	(Thailand) Yuttana Charoenphon (South Korea) Kim Dong-ju (United Kingdom) Max Basing (South Africa) Thando Longwe-Smit
August 18	Huy, Belgium; Clay; M15; Singles and doubles draws	(Belgium) Jack Logé; 6–3, 7–6^{(7–5)}	(Netherlands) Stijn Slump	(Belgium) Harold Huens (Germany) Vincent Marysko	(Belgium) Alessio Basile (Netherlands) Mac Visser (Belgium) Simon Beaupain (France) Matisse Bobichon
August 18	Huy, Belgium; Clay; M15; Singles and doubles draws	(France) César Bouchelaghem (Belgium) Romain Faucon; 2–6, 7–5, [10–5]	(Netherlands) Mac Visser (Netherlands) Lars Wagenaar	(Belgium) Harold Huens (Germany) Vincent Marysko	(Belgium) Alessio Basile (Netherlands) Mac Visser (Belgium) Simon Beaupain (France) Matisse Bobichon
August 18	Mistelbach, Austria; Clay; M15; Singles and doubles draws	(Austria) Sandro Kopp; 6–2, 6–3	(Poland) Marcel Zieliński	(Hungary) Attila Boros (Greece) Dimitris Sakellaridis	(Italy) Lorenzo Angelini; Egor Pleshivtsev (Argentina) Bautista Vilicich (Austria) Neil Oberleitner
August 18	Mistelbach, Austria; Clay; M15; Singles and doubles draws	(Hungary) Attila Boros (Hungary) Matyas Fuele; 7–6^{(7–3)}, 5–7, [10–7]	(Austria) Nico Hipfl (Czech Republic) Denis Peták	(Hungary) Attila Boros (Greece) Dimitris Sakellaridis	(Italy) Lorenzo Angelini; Egor Pleshivtsev (Argentina) Bautista Vilicich (Austria) Neil Oberleitner
August 18	Kraków, Poland; Clay; M15; Singles and doubles draws	(Poland) Karol Filar; 7–6^{(11–9)}, 6–4	(Ukraine) Vladyslav Orlov	(Czech Republic) Jakub Filip (South Africa) Alec Beckley	(Poland) Martyn Pawelski (Spain) Mario González Fernández (Latvia) Kārlis Ozoliņš (Ukraine) Nikita Mashtakov
August 18	Kraków, Poland; Clay; M15; Singles and doubles draws	(Germany) Jannik Opitz (Germany) Tom Zeuch; 3–6, 6–2, [10–7]	(Ukraine) Nikita Mashtakov (Latvia) Kārlis Ozoliņš	(Czech Republic) Jakub Filip (South Africa) Alec Beckley	(Poland) Martyn Pawelski (Spain) Mario González Fernández (Latvia) Kārlis Ozoliņš (Ukraine) Nikita Mashtakov
August 18	Båstad, Sweden; Clay; M15; Singles and doubles draws	(France) Felix Balshaw; 4–6, 6–1, 6–1	(Sweden) Nikola Slavic	(Sweden) Filip Gustafsson (France) Axel Garcian	(Italy) Daniele Rapagnetta (Sweden) Max Dahlin (Germany) Marlon Vankan (Sweden) Isac Stroemberg
August 18	Båstad, Sweden; Clay; M15; Singles and doubles draws	(Sweden) Oliver Johansson (New Zealand) Anton Shepp; 6–4, 6–4	(Sweden) John Hallquist Lithén (Sweden) Nikola Slavic	(Sweden) Filip Gustafsson (France) Axel Garcian	(Italy) Daniele Rapagnetta (Sweden) Max Dahlin (Germany) Marlon Vankan (Sweden) Isac Stroemberg
August 18	Arad, Romania; Clay; M15; Singles and doubles draws	(Romania) Cezar Crețu; 6–0, 6–1	(Romania) Ștefan Adrian Andreescu	(Romania) Ștefan Paloși (Argentina) Tomás Farjat	(Argentina) Fermín Tenti; Ivan Denisov (Romania) Rareș Teodor Pieleanu (Chile) Diego Fernández Flores
August 18	Arad, Romania; Clay; M15; Singles and doubles draws	(Romania) Ștefan Adrian Andreescu (Romania) Gheorghe Claudiu Schinteie; 6–4, 7–5	(United Kingdom) Jeremy Gschwendtner (Italy) Federico Valle	(Romania) Ștefan Paloși (Argentina) Tomás Farjat	(Argentina) Fermín Tenti; Ivan Denisov (Romania) Rareș Teodor Pieleanu (Chile) Diego Fernández Flores
August 18	Pirot, Serbia; Clay; M15; Singles and doubles draws	Andrey Chepelev; 1–6, 6–3, 6–4	(Italy) Giuseppe La Vela	(Colombia) Frazier Rengifo (Argentina) Juan Estévez	Denis Klok (Serbia) Nikola Jović (Serbia) Ognjen Milić (Italy) Andrea Fiorentini
August 18	Pirot, Serbia; Clay; M15; Singles and doubles draws	Vardan Manukyan (Serbia) Tadija Radovanović; 7–6^{(7–2)}, 7–5	Egor Khotchenkov; Dmitrii Shirokii	(Colombia) Frazier Rengifo (Argentina) Juan Estévez	Denis Klok (Serbia) Nikola Jović (Serbia) Ognjen Milić (Italy) Andrea Fiorentini
August 18	Monastir, Tunisia; Hard; M15; Singles and doubles draws	(United Kingdom) Lui Maxted; 6–2, 7–6^{(8–6)}	(Morocco) Yassine Dlimi	(Morocco) Karim Bennani (Spain) Jorge Plans	(France) Étienne Donnet (France) Cyril Vandermeersch (Egypt) Michael Bassem Sobhy; Daniil Ostapenkov
August 18	Monastir, Tunisia; Hard; M15; Singles and doubles draws	(United Kingdom) Lui Maxted (United Kingdom) William Nolan; 6–7^{(7–9)}, 6–2, [10–8]	(France) Étienne Donnet (United Kingdom) Finn Murgett	(Morocco) Karim Bennani (Spain) Jorge Plans	(France) Étienne Donnet (France) Cyril Vandermeersch (Egypt) Michael Bassem Sobhy; Daniil Ostapenkov
August 25	Taipei, Taiwan; Hard; M25; Singles and doubles draws	(Turkey) Yankı Erel; 6–2, 6–4	(Japan) Yuki Mochizuki	(South Korea) Kwon Soon-woo (Japan) Ryuki Matsuda	(Australia) Matthew Dellavedova (Australia) Dane Sweeny (Chinese Taipei) Chen Yan-cheng (United Kingdom) Charles Broom
August 25	Taipei, Taiwan; Hard; M25; Singles and doubles draws	(Japan) Taisei Ichikawa (Japan) Ryuki Matsuda; 6–3, 6–4	(United States) Alafia Ayeni (Australia) Ethan Cook	(South Korea) Kwon Soon-woo (Japan) Ryuki Matsuda	(Australia) Matthew Dellavedova (Australia) Dane Sweeny (Chinese Taipei) Chen Yan-cheng (United Kingdom) Charles Broom
August 25	Oviedo, Spain; Clay; M25; Singles and doubles draws	(Spain) Miguel Damas; 6–3, 4–6, 6–3	(Spain) Pedro Vives Marcos	(Italy) Lorenzo Giustino (Spain) Javier Barranco Cosano	(Spain) Iván Marrero Curbelo (South Korea) Gerard Campaña Lee (Netherlands) Michiel de Krom (Spain) Carlos López Montagud
August 25	Oviedo, Spain; Clay; M25; Singles and doubles draws	(Spain) Pedro Vives Marcos (Spain) Benjamín Winter López; 6–4, 6–3	(Spain) Rafael Izquierdo Luque (Spain) Iván Marrero Curbelo	(Italy) Lorenzo Giustino (Spain) Javier Barranco Cosano	(Spain) Iván Marrero Curbelo (South Korea) Gerard Campaña Lee (Netherlands) Michiel de Krom (Spain) Carlos López Montagud
August 25	Oldenzaal, Netherlands; Clay; M25; Singles and doubles draws	(Germany) Florian Broska; 6–4, 7–5	(France) Lilian Marmousez	(Belgium) Buvaysar Gadamauri (Ukraine) Eric Vanshelboim	(Netherlands) Niels Visker (Netherlands) Deney Wassermann (United States) Adhithya Ganesan (Netherlands) Alec Deckers
August 25	Oldenzaal, Netherlands; Clay; M25; Singles and doubles draws	(Netherlands) Jarno Jans (Netherlands) Niels Visker; 6–4, 6–1	(Netherlands) Elgin Khoeblal (Netherlands) Deney Wassermann	(Belgium) Buvaysar Gadamauri (Ukraine) Eric Vanshelboim	(Netherlands) Niels Visker (Netherlands) Deney Wassermann (United States) Adhithya Ganesan (Netherlands) Alec Deckers
August 25	Sion, Switzerland; Clay; M25; Singles and doubles draws	(Switzerland) Rémy Bertola; 7–6^{(7–3)}, 6–2	(Germany) Patrick Zahraj	(Italy) Alexander Weis (Switzerland) Damien Wenger	(Switzerland) Luca Staeheli (Switzerland) Henry Bernet (Switzerland) Johan Nikles (Germany) Lucas Gerch
August 25	Sion, Switzerland; Clay; M25; Singles and doubles draws	(Switzerland) Andrin Casanova (Switzerland) Nicolás Parizzia; 6–3, 6–2	(Greece) Dimitris Sakellaridis (Germany) Kai Wehnelt	(Italy) Alexander Weis (Switzerland) Damien Wenger	(Switzerland) Luca Staeheli (Switzerland) Henry Bernet (Switzerland) Johan Nikles (Germany) Lucas Gerch
August 25	Poznań, Poland; Clay; M25; Singles and doubles draws	(Poland) Fryderyk Lechno-Wasiutyński; 4–6, 6–2, 7–5	(France) Mathys Erhard	Alexey Vatutin (Czech Republic) Matthew William Donald	Kirill Kivattsev (Poland) Karol Filar (Poland) Maks Kaśnikowski (France) Corentin Denolly
August 25	Poznań, Poland; Clay; M25; Singles and doubles draws	(Chinese Taipei) Jeffrey Hsu (Latvia) Kārlis Ozoliņš; 2–6, 6–4, [10–5]	(Republic of Ireland) Conor Gannon (United Kingdom) Harry Rock	Alexey Vatutin (Czech Republic) Matthew William Donald	Kirill Kivattsev (Poland) Karol Filar (Poland) Maks Kaśnikowski (France) Corentin Denolly
August 25	Maribor, Slovenia; Clay; M25; Singles and doubles draws	(Hungary) Máté Valkusz; 6–2, 3–6, 6–1	(Bosnia and Herzegovina) Mirza Bašić	(Austria) Dennis Novak (Czech Republic) Martin Krumich	(Serbia) Stefan Popović (Slovenia) Filip Jeff Planinšek (France) Sean Cuenin (Bosnia and Herzegovina) Andrej Nedić
August 25	Maribor, Slovenia; Clay; M25; Singles and doubles draws	(Croatia) Admir Kalender; Pavel Verbin; 6–4, 7–5	(Serbia) Marko Maksimović (Serbia) Dušan Obradović	(Austria) Dennis Novak (Czech Republic) Martin Krumich	(Serbia) Stefan Popović (Slovenia) Filip Jeff Planinšek (France) Sean Cuenin (Bosnia and Herzegovina) Andrej Nedić
August 25	Trelew, Argentina; Hard (i); M25; Singles and doubles draws	(United States) Samir Banerjee; 6–1, 6–2	(Argentina) Gonzalo Villanueva	(Argentina) Hernán Casanova (Argentina) Juan Manuel La Serna	(Chile) Nicolás Villalón (Argentina) Lautaro Agustín Falabella (Argentina) Santiago de la Fuente (Argentina) Fernando Cavallo
August 25	Trelew, Argentina; Hard (i); M25; Singles and doubles draws	(United States) Samir Banerjee (United States) Noah Schachter; 6–4, 6–4	(Argentina) Valentín Basel (Argentina) Franco Ribero	(Argentina) Hernán Casanova (Argentina) Juan Manuel La Serna	(Chile) Nicolás Villalón (Argentina) Lautaro Agustín Falabella (Argentina) Santiago de la Fuente (Argentina) Fernando Cavallo
August 25	Hong Kong, Hong Kong; Hard; M15; Singles and doubles draws	(France) Arthur Weber; 6–2, 6–3	(Australia) Sam Ryan Ziegann	(Japan) Yuta Kawahashi (South Korea) Lee Duck-hee	Bekkhan Atlangeriev (United States) Michael Zhu (Italy) Niccolò Catini (South Korea) Oh Chan-yeong
August 25	Hong Kong, Hong Kong; Hard; M15; Singles and doubles draws	(Japan) Shinji Hazawa (Japan) Yuta Kawahashi; 6–2, 6–2	(Japan) Makoto Ochi (Japan) Kosuke Shibano	(Japan) Yuta Kawahashi (South Korea) Lee Duck-hee	Bekkhan Atlangeriev (United States) Michael Zhu (Italy) Niccolò Catini (South Korea) Oh Chan-yeong
August 25	Ma'anshan, China; Hard (i); M15; Singles and doubles draws	Egor Agafonov; 7–6^{(7–2)}, 6–4	Artur Kukasian	(Philippines) Alberto Lim Jr. Maxim Zhukov	(China) Liu Shaoyun (South Korea) Sim Sung-been (China) Kong Weiyi (India) Vishnu Vardhan
August 25	Ma'anshan, China; Hard (i); M15; Singles and doubles draws	(South Korea) Cho Seong-woo (China) Yang Zijiang; 6–3, 6–4	(South Korea) Han Seon-yong (India) Vishnu Vardhan	(Philippines) Alberto Lim Jr. Maxim Zhukov	(China) Liu Shaoyun (South Korea) Sim Sung-been (China) Kong Weiyi (India) Vishnu Vardhan
August 25	Nakhon Pathom, Thailand; Hard; M15; Singles and doubles draws	(United Kingdom) Max Basing; 7–6^{(8–6)}, 6–2	(Czech Republic) Dominik Palán	(India) Mukund Sasikumar (Indonesia) Muhammad Rifqi Fitriadi	(Thailand) Pawit Sornlaksup (Thailand) Jirat Navasirisomboon (India) Sidharth Rawat (Japan) Leo Vithoontien
August 25	Nakhon Pathom, Thailand; Hard; M15; Singles and doubles draws	(India) Sai Karteek Reddy Ganta (Thailand) Thantub Suksumrarn; 7–6^{(7–0)}, 6–3	(India) Atharva Sharma (Japan) Yuta Tomida	(India) Mukund Sasikumar (Indonesia) Muhammad Rifqi Fitriadi	(Thailand) Pawit Sornlaksup (Thailand) Jirat Navasirisomboon (India) Sidharth Rawat (Japan) Leo Vithoontien
August 25	Cap d'Agde, France; Clay; M15; Singles and doubles draws	(France) Maxime Chazal; 5–7, 6–2, 6–2	(France) Florent Bax	(France) Mathieu Scaglia (France) Constantin Bittoun Kouzmine	(France) Axel Garcian (France) Maxence Beaugé (France) Lucas Bouquet (France) Damien Salvestre
August 25	Cap d'Agde, France; Clay; M15; Singles and doubles draws	(France) Maxence Beaugé (France) Lucas Bouquet; 6–2, 6–1	(France) Benjamin Pietri (France) Mathieu Scaglia	(France) Mathieu Scaglia (France) Constantin Bittoun Kouzmine	(France) Axel Garcian (France) Maxence Beaugé (France) Lucas Bouquet (France) Damien Salvestre
August 25	Allershausen, Germany; Clay; M15; Singles and doubles draws	(Spain) Imanol López Morillo; 6–2, 6–2	(Republic of Ireland) Peter Buldorini	(Republic of Ireland) Michael Agwi (Germany) Adrian Oetzbach	(Germany) Vincent Marysko (Czech Republic) Jonáš Kučera (Germany) Mika Lipp (Syria) Hazem Naw
August 25	Allershausen, Germany; Clay; M15; Singles and doubles draws	(Germany) Maximilian Homberg (United States) Christopher Papa; 6–2, 6–4	(Germany) Bengt Johan Reinhard (Germany) Tom Sickenberger	(Republic of Ireland) Michael Agwi (Germany) Adrian Oetzbach	(Germany) Vincent Marysko (Czech Republic) Jonáš Kučera (Germany) Mika Lipp (Syria) Hazem Naw
August 25	Forlì, Italy; Clay; M15; Singles and doubles draws	(Italy) Samuele Pieri; 6–1, 6–7^{(0–7)}, 6–1	(Italy) Giovanni Oradini	(Italy) Lorenzo Beraldo (Iran) Kasra Rahmani	(Italy) Jacopo Bilardo (Italy) Daniele Rapagnetta (Italy) Pietro Romeo Scomparin (Italy) Nicola Rispoli
August 25	Forlì, Italy; Clay; M15; Singles and doubles draws	(Italy) Jacopo Bilardo (Italy) Niccolò Ciavarella; 7–6^{(7–4)}, 6–4	(Iran) Kasra Rahmani (Italy) Daniele Rapagnetta	(Italy) Lorenzo Beraldo (Iran) Kasra Rahmani	(Italy) Jacopo Bilardo (Italy) Daniele Rapagnetta (Italy) Pietro Romeo Scomparin (Italy) Nicola Rispoli
August 25	Vienna, Austria; Clay; M15; Singles and doubles draws	(Croatia) Josip Šimundža; 6–4, 2–6, 7–5	(Austria) Neil Oberleitner	(Sweden) Karl Friberg (Germany) Noel Larwig	(Slovakia) Radovan Michalik; Aleksander Chayka (Austria) Alexander Wagner (Germany) Alen Mujakić
August 25	Vienna, Austria; Clay; M15; Singles and doubles draws	(Austria) Nico Hipfl (Austria) Gregor Ramskogler; 6–7^{(0–7)}, 6–4, [10–7]	(United States) Theodore Dean (United States) Aadarsh Tripathi	(Sweden) Karl Friberg (Germany) Noel Larwig	(Slovakia) Radovan Michalik; Aleksander Chayka (Austria) Alexander Wagner (Germany) Alen Mujakić
August 25	Budapest, Hungary; Hard; M15; Singles and doubles draws	(United Kingdom) Liam Broady; 2–6, 6–0, 6–0	(Hungary) Matyas Fuele	(France) Guillaume Dalmasso (United Kingdom) Matthew Summers	(Hungary) Attila Boros (United Kingdom) Benjamin Gusic Wan (Hungary) Péter Makk (Hungary) Gábor Hornung
August 25	Budapest, Hungary; Hard; M15; Singles and doubles draws	(Hungary) Mark Kéki (Hungary) Mate Voros; 6–3, 6–4	(Cyprus) Melios Efstathiou (Cyprus) Eleftherios Neos	(France) Guillaume Dalmasso (United Kingdom) Matthew Summers	(Hungary) Attila Boros (United Kingdom) Benjamin Gusic Wan (Hungary) Péter Makk (Hungary) Gábor Hornung
August 25	Bucharest, Romania; Clay; M15; Singles and doubles draws	(Romania) Cezar Crețu; 7–6^{(7–4)}, 6–4	(Romania) Radu David Țurcanu	(Ukraine) Oleksandr Ovcharenko (Romania) Rareș Teodor Pieleanu	(Romania) Radu Mihai Papoe (Bulgaria) Petr Nesterov (Romania) Ștefan Paloși (Romania) Ștefan Adrian Andreescu
August 25	Bucharest, Romania; Clay; M15; Singles and doubles draws	(Romania) Gabriel Ghețu (Romania) Radu David Țurcanu; 4–6, 6–4, [10–7]	(Romania) Ștefan Adrian Andreescu (Romania) Dragoș Nicolae Cazacu	(Ukraine) Oleksandr Ovcharenko (Romania) Rareș Teodor Pieleanu	(Romania) Radu Mihai Papoe (Bulgaria) Petr Nesterov (Romania) Ștefan Paloși (Romania) Ștefan Adrian Andreescu
August 25	Monastir, Tunisia; Hard; M15; Singles and doubles draws	(Spain) Jorge Plans; 6–2, 6–4	(United Kingdom) Finn Murgett	(United Kingdom) Lui Maxted (Algeria) Samir Hamza Reguig	(Algeria) Toufik Sahtali (United Kingdom) Joe Leather (France) Maxence Rivet (France) Nicolas Jadoun
August 25	Monastir, Tunisia; Hard; M15; Singles and doubles draws	(Spain) Ignasi Forcano (United Kingdom) Finn Murgett; 6–4, 6–4	(United Kingdom) Joe Leather (United States) Tyler Stice	(United Kingdom) Lui Maxted (Algeria) Samir Hamza Reguig	(Algeria) Toufik Sahtali (United Kingdom) Joe Leather (France) Maxence Rivet (France) Nicolas Jadoun

=== September ===
Week of	Tournament	Winner	Runners-up	Semifinalists	Quarterfinalists
September 1	Bali, Indonesia; Hard; M25; Singles and doubles draws	(United Kingdom) Max Basing; 4–6, 5–2 ret.	(Turkey) Yankı Erel	(Japan) Koki Matsuda (Indonesia) Muhammad Rifqi Fitriadi	(India) S D Prajwal Dev (New Zealand) Alexander Klintcharov (Malaysia) Mitsuki Wei Kang Leong (United States) Alexander Chang
September 1	Bali, Indonesia; Hard; M25; Singles and doubles draws	(United Kingdom) Max Basing (Japan) Koki Matsuda; 6–2, 6–2	(Indonesia) Lucky Candra Kurniawan (Indonesia) Tegar Abdi Satrio Wibowo	(Japan) Koki Matsuda (Indonesia) Muhammad Rifqi Fitriadi	(India) S D Prajwal Dev (New Zealand) Alexander Klintcharov (Malaysia) Mitsuki Wei Kang Leong (United States) Alexander Chang
September 1	Nakhon Pathom, Thailand; Hard; M25; Singles and doubles draws	(Czech Republic) Dominik Palán; 6–4, 6–2	(India) Mukund Sasikumar	(South Korea) Kim Dong-ju (Thailand) James Van Herzeele	(Japan) Leo Vithoontien (Thailand) Pawit Sornlaksup (New Zealand) Isaac Becroft (South Korea) Chu Seok-hyeon
September 1	Nakhon Pathom, Thailand; Hard; M25; Singles and doubles draws	(Japan) Tomohiro Masabayashi (Thailand) Thantub Suksumrarn; 7–6^{(7–2)}, 6–4	(Australia) Jesse Delaney (Japan) Leo Vithoontien	(South Korea) Kim Dong-ju (Thailand) James Van Herzeele	(Japan) Leo Vithoontien (Thailand) Pawit Sornlaksup (New Zealand) Isaac Becroft (South Korea) Chu Seok-hyeon
September 1	Sapporo, Japan; Hard; M25; Singles and doubles draws	(United Kingdom) Charles Broom; 7–6^{(7–4)}, 7–5	(Japan) Kaichi Uchida	(Japan) Takuya Kumasaka (Japan) Hikaru Shiraishi	(Japan) Naoki Nakagawa (Japan) Yusuke Takahashi (Japan) Ryota Tanuma (Australia) Matthew Dellavedova
September 1	Sapporo, Japan; Hard; M25; Singles and doubles draws	(Japan) Yusuke Kusuhara (Japan) Shunsuke Nakagawa; 3–6, 7–6^{(7–3)}, [11–9]	(Japan) Shinji Hazawa (Japan) Yuki Mochizuki	(Japan) Takuya Kumasaka (Japan) Hikaru Shiraishi	(Japan) Naoki Nakagawa (Japan) Yusuke Takahashi (Japan) Ryota Tanuma (Australia) Matthew Dellavedova
September 1	Bagnères-de-Bigorre, France; Hard; M25+H; Singles and doubles draws	(France) Alexis Gautier; 6–4, 6–4	(France) Maxence Beaugé	(United Kingdom) James Story (France) Axel Garcian	(United Kingdom) Finn Bass (Spain) Sergio Callejón Hernando (France) Pierre Delage (Estonia) Kristjan Tamm
September 1	Bagnères-de-Bigorre, France; Hard; M25+H; Singles and doubles draws	(United Kingdom) Finn Bass (United Kingdom) Ben Jones; 4–6, 7–6^{(8–6)}, [12–10]	(France) Maxence Beaugé (France) Axel Garcian	(United Kingdom) James Story (France) Axel Garcian	(United Kingdom) Finn Bass (Spain) Sergio Callejón Hernando (France) Pierre Delage (Estonia) Kristjan Tamm
September 1	Meerbusch, Germany; Clay; M25; Singles and doubles draws	(Belgium) Gilles-Arnaud Bailly; 6–4, 3–6, 7–6^{(7–5)}	(Netherlands) Max Houkes	(Czech Republic) Daniel Siniakov (Germany) Justin Schlageter	(Germany) Richard Antoni (Germany) Marvin Möller (Germany) Niklas Schell (Germany) Vincent Marysko
September 1	Meerbusch, Germany; Clay; M25; Singles and doubles draws	(Germany) Christian Djonov (Germany) Vincent Marysko; 7–5, 6–1	(Germany) Finn Bischof (Germany) Sydney Zick	(Czech Republic) Daniel Siniakov (Germany) Justin Schlageter	(Germany) Richard Antoni (Germany) Marvin Möller (Germany) Niklas Schell (Germany) Vincent Marysko
September 1	Lausanne, Switzerland; Clay; M25; Singles and doubles draws	(Switzerland) Henry Bernet; 6–4, 6–4	(Germany) Lucas Gerch	(Greece) Ioannis Xilas (Switzerland) Johan Nikles	(France) Leo Lagarrigue (Switzerland) Luca Staeheli (France) Thomas Faurel (Switzerland) Damien Wenger
September 1	Lausanne, Switzerland; Clay; M25; Singles and doubles draws	(Republic of Ireland) Charles Barry (France) Max Westphal; 6–3, 7–6^{(7–5)}	(Chinese Taipei) Jeffrey Hsu (Greece) Dimitris Sakellaridis	(Greece) Ioannis Xilas (Switzerland) Johan Nikles	(France) Leo Lagarrigue (Switzerland) Luca Staeheli (France) Thomas Faurel (Switzerland) Damien Wenger
September 1	Mar del Plata, Argentina; Clay; M25; Singles and doubles draws	(Paraguay) Daniel Vallejo; 7–6^{(7–4)}, 6–3	(Argentina) Lautaro Midón	(Peru) Juan Pablo Varillas (Argentina) Nicolás Kicker	(Argentina) Fernando Cavallo (Brazil) Daniel Dutra da Silva (Brazil) Pedro Sakamoto (Argentina) Guido Iván Justo
September 1	Mar del Plata, Argentina; Clay; M25; Singles and doubles draws	(Argentina) Santiago de la Fuente (Argentina) Lautaro Agustín Falabella; 6–4, 3–6, [10–6]	(Argentina) Valentín Basel (Argentina) Franco Ribero	(Peru) Juan Pablo Varillas (Argentina) Nicolás Kicker	(Argentina) Fernando Cavallo (Brazil) Daniel Dutra da Silva (Brazil) Pedro Sakamoto (Argentina) Guido Iván Justo
September 1	Hong Kong, Hong Kong; Hard; M15; Singles and doubles draws	(France) Arthur Weber; 6–2, 6–3	(Japan) Yuta Kawahashi	(China) Chen Xingdao (United States) Alafia Ayeni	(Japan) Makoto Ochi (Italy) Niccolò Catini (Japan) Sora Fukuda (South Korea) Oh Chan-yeong
September 1	Hong Kong, Hong Kong; Hard; M15; Singles and doubles draws	(South Korea) Lee Duck-hee (South Korea) Oh Chan-yeong; 7–5, 6–1	(Australia) Pham Hien (Hong Kong) Wong Tsz-fu	(China) Chen Xingdao (United States) Alafia Ayeni	(Japan) Makoto Ochi (Italy) Niccolò Catini (Japan) Sora Fukuda (South Korea) Oh Chan-yeong
September 1	Ma'anshan, China; Hard (i); M15; Singles and doubles draws	Maxim Zhukov; 7–5, 3–0 ret.	Egor Agafonov	(Japan) Akira Santillan (South Korea) Sim Sung-been	(Australia) Chase Ferguson (China) Chen Ye (Japan) Yuta Kikuchi (Japan) Taiyo Yamanaka
September 1	Ma'anshan, China; Hard (i); M15; Singles and doubles draws	(South Korea) Cho Seong-woo (China) Yang Zijiang; 6–3, 6–1	Egor Agafonov; Maxim Zhukov	(Japan) Akira Santillan (South Korea) Sim Sung-been	(Australia) Chase Ferguson (China) Chen Ye (Japan) Yuta Kikuchi (Japan) Taiyo Yamanaka
September 1	Madrid, Spain; Clay; M15; Singles and doubles draws	(Argentina) Julio César Porras; 6–4, 3–6, 7–6^{(7–2)}	(Spain) Alejandro Manzanera Pertusa	(Spain) Tomás Currás Abasolo (Spain) Pedro Ródenas	(Spain) Enrique Carrascosa Diaz (Spain) Diego Augusto Barreto Sánchez (Bulgaria) Anas Mazdrashki (Greece) Pavlos Tsitsipas
September 1	Madrid, Spain; Clay; M15; Singles and doubles draws	Kirill Mishkin; Vitali Shvets; 6–3, 6–3	Pavel Petrov (Spain) Pedro Ródenas	(Spain) Tomás Currás Abasolo (Spain) Pedro Ródenas	(Spain) Enrique Carrascosa Diaz (Spain) Diego Augusto Barreto Sánchez (Bulgaria) Anas Mazdrashki (Greece) Pavlos Tsitsipas
September 1	Haren, Netherlands; Clay; M15; Singles and doubles draws	(Germany) Mika Petkovic; 6–4, 4–6, 6–4	(Netherlands) Stijn Paardekooper	(United States) Adhithya Ganesan (Netherlands) Brian Bozemoj	(France) Amaury Raynel (Netherlands) Stijn Slump (Netherlands) Mac Visser (Germany) Adrian Oetzbach
September 1	Haren, Netherlands; Clay; M15; Singles and doubles draws	(Netherlands) Jarno Jans (Netherlands) Niels Visker; 6–3, 6–3	(Netherlands) Brian Bozemoj (Netherlands) Stijn Pel	(United States) Adhithya Ganesan (Netherlands) Brian Bozemoj	(France) Amaury Raynel (Netherlands) Stijn Slump (Netherlands) Mac Visser (Germany) Adrian Oetzbach
September 1	Bologna, Italy; Clay; M15; Singles and doubles draws	(Italy) Giorgio Tabacco; 6–1, 6–0	(Italy) Juan Cruz Martin Manzano	(Italy) Leonardo Malgaroli (Iran) Kasra Rahmani	(Italy) Giulio Perego (Italy) Pietro Romeo Scomparin (Italy) Daniele Rapagnetta (Lithuania) Ainius Sabaliauskas
September 1	Bologna, Italy; Clay; M15; Singles and doubles draws	(Italy) Giulio Perego (Italy) Lorenzo Sciahbasi; 3–6, 6–4, [10–5]	(Iran) Kasra Rahmani (Italy) Daniele Rapagnetta	(Italy) Leonardo Malgaroli (Iran) Kasra Rahmani	(Italy) Giulio Perego (Italy) Pietro Romeo Scomparin (Italy) Daniele Rapagnetta (Lithuania) Ainius Sabaliauskas
September 1	Szczawno-Zdrój, Poland; Clay; M15; Singles and doubles draws	(Ukraine) Vladyslav Orlov; 7–5, 6–7^{(5–7)}, 6–3	(Poland) Marcel Zieliński	(Czech Republic) Jakub Filip (Brazil) Igor Gimenez	(Czech Republic) Tadeáš Paroulek (Germany) Tom Zeuch (Poland) Jasza Szajrych (Germany) Jonas Pelle Hartenstein
September 1	Szczawno-Zdrój, Poland; Clay; M15; Singles and doubles draws	(Poland) Alan Bojarski (Poland) Aleksander Orlikowski; 7–5, 2–6, [10–8]	(Republic of Ireland) Conor Gannon (United Kingdom) Harry Rock	(Czech Republic) Jakub Filip (Brazil) Igor Gimenez	(Czech Republic) Tadeáš Paroulek (Germany) Tom Zeuch (Poland) Jasza Szajrych (Germany) Jonas Pelle Hartenstein
September 1	Buzău, Romania; Clay; M15; Singles and doubles draws	(Romania) Ștefan Paloși; 7–5, 6–7^{(4–7)}, 6–1	(Romania) Dan Alexandru Tomescu	(Romania) Mihai Alexandru Coman (Romania) Ștefan Adrian Andreescu	(France) Édouard Villoslada (United Kingdom) Jeremy Gschwendtner (Romania) Matei Florin Breazu (Romania) Dragoș Nicolae Cazacu
September 1	Buzău, Romania; Clay; M15; Singles and doubles draws	(Romania) Dragoș Nicolae Cazacu (United Kingdom) Jeremy Gschwendtner; 2–6, 6–3, [10–4]	(Romania) Alexandru Cristian Dumitru; Uladzimir Ignatik	(Romania) Mihai Alexandru Coman (Romania) Ștefan Adrian Andreescu	(France) Édouard Villoslada (United Kingdom) Jeremy Gschwendtner (Romania) Matei Florin Breazu (Romania) Dragoș Nicolae Cazacu
September 1	Kuršumlijska Banja, Serbia; Clay; M15; Singles and doubles draws	(Serbia) Ognjen Milić; 7–6^{(14–12)}, 6–2	Andrey Chepelev	(Germany) Marlon Vankan (United Kingdom) Felix Gill	(Serbia) Stefan Popović (Argentina) Fermín Tenti (Italy) Giuseppe La Vela (Serbia) Kristijan Juhas
September 1	Kuršumlijska Banja, Serbia; Clay; M15; Singles and doubles draws	(Argentina) Fermín Tenti (Germany) Marlon Vankan; 6–4, 3–6, [10–5]	(Italy) Antonio Caruso (Norway) Fredrik Krogh Solheim	(Germany) Marlon Vankan (United Kingdom) Felix Gill	(Serbia) Stefan Popović (Argentina) Fermín Tenti (Italy) Giuseppe La Vela (Serbia) Kristijan Juhas
September 1	Hurghada, Egypt; Hard; M15; Singles and doubles draws	(Egypt) Michael Bassem Sobhy; 6–3, 6–3	(South Africa) Kris van Wyk	(Germany) Edison Ambarzumjan; Ivan Gretskiy	(France) Hugo Pierre (Germany) David Eichenseher (United Kingdom) Viktor Frydrych (Estonia) Oliver Ojakäär
September 1	Hurghada, Egypt; Hard; M15; Singles and doubles draws	(Egypt) Karim Ibrahim (Estonia) Oliver Ojakäär; 6–2, 6–7^{(6–8)}, [11–9]	(Italy) Lorenzo Lorusso (South Africa) Kris van Wyk	(Germany) Edison Ambarzumjan; Ivan Gretskiy	(France) Hugo Pierre (Germany) David Eichenseher (United Kingdom) Viktor Frydrych (Estonia) Oliver Ojakäär
September 1	Monastir, Tunisia; Hard; M15; Singles and doubles draws	(Australia) Jacob Bradshaw; 6–1, 6–4	(Algeria) Samir Hamza Reguig	(Algeria) Toufik Sahtali (France) César Bouchelaghem	(Tunisia) Aziz Ouakaa (France) Arthur Nagel (France) Remy Dugardin (France) Maxence Bertimon
September 1	Monastir, Tunisia; Hard; M15; Singles and doubles draws	(Spain) Ignasi Forcano (Tunisia) Adam Nagoudi; 6–3, 6–4	(Tunisia) Anas Bennour Dit Sahli (Tunisia) Aziz Ouakaa	(Algeria) Toufik Sahtali (France) César Bouchelaghem	(Tunisia) Aziz Ouakaa (France) Arthur Nagel (France) Remy Dugardin (France) Maxence Bertimon
September 8	Tamworth, Australia; Hard; M25; Singles and doubles draws	(Australia) Dane Sweeny; 2–6, 6–4, 6–3	(Australia) Marc Polmans	(Poland) Filip Peliwo (Turkey) Mustafa Ege Sik	(Australia) Pavle Marinkov (Australia) Tai Sach (Australia) Enzo Aguiard (Northern Mariana Islands) Colin Sinclair
September 8	Tamworth, Australia; Hard; M25; Singles and doubles draws	(Australia) Joshua Charlton (Australia) Calum Puttergill; 6–1, 6–7^{(5–7)}, [11–9]	(Australia) Jake Delaney (Australia) Jesse Delaney	(Poland) Filip Peliwo (Turkey) Mustafa Ege Sik	(Australia) Pavle Marinkov (Australia) Tai Sach (Australia) Enzo Aguiard (Northern Mariana Islands) Colin Sinclair
September 8	Bali, Indonesia; Hard; M25; Singles and doubles draws	(United Kingdom) Max Basing; 6–0, 6–2	(France) Arthur Weber	(India) S D Prajwal Dev (Italy) Niccolò Catini	(New Zealand) Alexander Klintcharov (Japan) Koki Matsuda (Malaysia) Mitsuki Wei Kang Leong (Japan) Kazuki Nishiwaki
September 8	Bali, Indonesia; Hard; M25; Singles and doubles draws	(Indonesia) Muhammad Rifqi Fitriadi (Indonesia) Christopher Rungkat; 6–0, 2–6, [10–7]	(Malaysia) Mitsuki Wei Kang Leong (Japan) Koki Matsuda	(India) S D Prajwal Dev (Italy) Niccolò Catini	(New Zealand) Alexander Klintcharov (Japan) Koki Matsuda (Malaysia) Mitsuki Wei Kang Leong (Japan) Kazuki Nishiwaki
September 8	Sapporo, Japan; Hard; M25; Singles and doubles draws	(Japan) Renta Tokuda; 6–3, 1–6, 6–4	(Japan) Kaichi Uchida	(Japan) Naoki Nakagawa (United Kingdom) Charles Broom	(United Kingdom) Mark Whitehouse (Japan) Shunsuke Nakagawa (Japan) Masamichi Imamura (Australia) Matthew Dellavedova
September 8	Sapporo, Japan; Hard; M25; Singles and doubles draws	(Japan) Yuki Mochizuki (Japan) Masakatsu Noguchi; 6–3, 6–3	(Japan) Keisuke Saitoh (Japan) Daisuke Sumizawa	(Japan) Naoki Nakagawa (United Kingdom) Charles Broom	(United Kingdom) Mark Whitehouse (Japan) Shunsuke Nakagawa (Japan) Masamichi Imamura (Australia) Matthew Dellavedova
September 8	Plaisir, France; Hard (i); M25+H; Singles and doubles draws	(Germany) Mats Rosenkranz; 6–3, 6–3	(United Kingdom) Hamish Stewart	(France) Simon Reveniau (United Kingdom) Harry Wendelken	(Belgium) Nicolas Ifi (France) Pierre Delage (France) Martin Sabas (United Kingdom) James Story
September 8	Plaisir, France; Hard (i); M25+H; Singles and doubles draws	(France) Axel Garcian (France) Yanis Ghazouani Durand; 3–6, 7–5, [10–5]	(United Kingdom) Finn Bass (United Kingdom) James MacKinlay	(France) Simon Reveniau (United Kingdom) Harry Wendelken	(Belgium) Nicolas Ifi (France) Pierre Delage (France) Martin Sabas (United Kingdom) James Story
September 8	Pozzuoli, Italy; Hard; M25; Singles and doubles draws	(Switzerland) Rémy Bertola; 7–6^{(7–5)}, 7–5	(United Kingdom) Ryan Peniston	(Spain) Carles Hernández (Italy) Luca Potenza	(Italy) Marcello Serafini (United Kingdom) Aidan McHugh (Italy) Fabrizio Andaloro (France) Étienne Donnet
September 8	Pozzuoli, Italy; Hard; M25; Singles and doubles draws	(Italy) Gabriele Crivellaro (Italy) Michele Mecarelli; 6–3, 6–3	(Italy) Fabrizio Andaloro (Italy) Daniele Augenti	(Spain) Carles Hernández (Italy) Luca Potenza	(Italy) Marcello Serafini (United Kingdom) Aidan McHugh (Italy) Fabrizio Andaloro (France) Étienne Donnet
September 8	Cuiabá, Brazil; Clay; M25; Singles and doubles draws	(Brazil) Mateus Alves; 4–6, 6–1, 6–3	(Brazil) Igor Marcondes	(United States) Bruno Kuzuhara (Brazil) Pedro Sakamoto	(Bolivia) Juan Carlos Prado Ángelo (Brazil) Pedro Boscardin Dias (Brazil) Paulo André Saraiva dos Santos (Brazil) Gustavo Heide
September 8	Cuiabá, Brazil; Clay; M25; Singles and doubles draws	(Brazil) Pedro Boscardin Dias (Brazil) Igor Marcondes; 6–2, 6–3	(Brazil) Victor Hugo Remondy Pagotto (Brazil) João Vítor Scramin do Lago	(United States) Bruno Kuzuhara (Brazil) Pedro Sakamoto	(Bolivia) Juan Carlos Prado Ángelo (Brazil) Pedro Boscardin Dias (Brazil) Paulo André Saraiva dos Santos (Brazil) Gustavo Heide
September 8	Ma'anshan, China; Hard (i); M15; Singles and doubles draws	(Chinese Taipei) Lee Kuan-yi; 3–6, 6–2, 6–1	Egor Agafonov	(Japan) Akira Santillan (South Korea) Choe Jae-sung	(Australia) Chase Ferguson (China) Wang Xiaofei; Artur Kukasian (Japan) Taiyo Yamanaka
September 8	Ma'anshan, China; Hard (i); M15; Singles and doubles draws	(South Korea) Cho Seong-woo (South Korea) Lee Duck-hee; 6–0, 6–4	(Japan) Akira Santillan (China) Wang Yukun	(Japan) Akira Santillan (South Korea) Choe Jae-sung	(Australia) Chase Ferguson (China) Wang Xiaofei; Artur Kukasian (Japan) Taiyo Yamanaka
September 8	Madrid, Spain; Hard; M15; Singles and doubles draws	(United Kingdom) Giles Hussey; 6–3, 6–0	(France) Matisse Bobichon	(France) Guillaume Dalmasso (Netherlands) Daniel de Jonge	(Brazil) João Victor Couto Loureiro (Norway) Leyton Rivera (Switzerland) Gian Luca Tanner (Spain) Mikel Martinez
September 8	Madrid, Spain; Hard; M15; Singles and doubles draws	(Venezuela) Brandon Pérez (Mexico) Manuel Sánchez; 4–6, 6–1, [10–8]	(Brazil) João Victor Couto Loureiro (Venezuela) Ricardo Rodríguez-Pace	(France) Guillaume Dalmasso (Netherlands) Daniel de Jonge	(Brazil) João Victor Couto Loureiro (Norway) Leyton Rivera (Switzerland) Gian Luca Tanner (Spain) Mikel Martinez
September 8	Kuršumlijska Banja, Serbia; Clay; M15; Singles and doubles draws	(Italy) Giuseppe La Vela; 6–3, 6–1	(Serbia) Ognjen Milić	(United Kingdom) Jeremy Gschwendtner (Serbia) Marko Maksimović	(Bulgaria) George Lazarov; Semen Pankin (Argentina) Juan Bautista Otegui (Serbia) Kristijan Juhas
September 8	Kuršumlijska Banja, Serbia; Clay; M15; Singles and doubles draws	(Argentina) Fermín Tenti (Germany) Marlon Vankan; 6–3, 7–5	(Argentina) Valentin Guadagno (Norway) Fredrik Krogh Solheim	(United Kingdom) Jeremy Gschwendtner (Serbia) Marko Maksimović	(Bulgaria) George Lazarov; Semen Pankin (Argentina) Juan Bautista Otegui (Serbia) Kristijan Juhas
September 8	Hurghada, Egypt; Hard; M15; Singles and doubles draws	(United Kingdom) Toby Samuel; 7–6^{(7–4)}, 6–1	(Hungary) Péter Makk	Timofei Derepasko (United Kingdom) Liam Broady	(United Kingdom) Viktor Frydrych (Germany) Edison Ambarzumjan (Greece) Dimitris Azoidis (Egypt) Karim Ibrahim
September 8	Hurghada, Egypt; Hard; M15; Singles and doubles draws	(Ukraine) Volodymyr Iakubenko (Hungary) Péter Makk; 6–4, 4–6, [10–6]	(Egypt) Karim Ibrahim; Saveliy Ivanov	Timofei Derepasko (United Kingdom) Liam Broady	(United Kingdom) Viktor Frydrych (Germany) Edison Ambarzumjan (Greece) Dimitris Azoidis (Egypt) Karim Ibrahim
September 8	Monastir, Tunisia; Hard; M15; Singles and doubles draws	(India) Manas Dhamne; 6–2, 6–0	(France) César Bouchelaghem	(Sweden) John Hallquist Lithén (Algeria) Toufik Sahtali	(Algeria) Mohamed Nazim Makhlouf (Germany) Luca Wiedenmann (United States) Ezekiel Clark (Denmark) Oskar Brostrøm Poulsen
September 8	Monastir, Tunisia; Hard; M15; Singles and doubles draws	(Denmark) Oskar Brostrøm Poulsen (Sweden) Nikola Slavic; 6–7^{(3–7)}, 6–2, [10–7]	(France) Alexandre Aubriot (France) Mathieu Scaglia	(Sweden) John Hallquist Lithén (Algeria) Toufik Sahtali	(Algeria) Mohamed Nazim Makhlouf (Germany) Luca Wiedenmann (United States) Ezekiel Clark (Denmark) Oskar Brostrøm Poulsen
September 15	Tamworth, Australia; Hard; M25; Singles and doubles draws	(Australia) Dane Sweeny; 6–2, 6–1	(Australia) Matthew Dellavedova	(Australia) Marc Polmans (Australia) Jake Delaney	(Australia) Scott Jones (Poland) Filip Peliwo (Australia) Pavle Marinkov (Northern Mariana Islands) Colin Sinclair
September 15	Tamworth, Australia; Hard; M25; Singles and doubles draws	(Australia) Jesse Delaney (Australia) Cruz Hewitt; 3–6, 6–3, [10–4]	(Australia) Ethan Cook (Australia) Tai Sach	(Australia) Marc Polmans (Australia) Jake Delaney	(Australia) Scott Jones (Poland) Filip Peliwo (Australia) Pavle Marinkov (Northern Mariana Islands) Colin Sinclair
September 15	Guiyang, China; Hard; M25; Singles and doubles draws	(Switzerland) Luca Castelnuovo; 6–4, 6–4	Petr Bar Biryukov	(Australia) Omar Jasika (Japan) Akira Santillan	(China) Wang Xiaofei (Kazakhstan) Denis Yevseyev (Australia) Chase Ferguson; Marat Sharipov
September 15	Guiyang, China; Hard; M25; Singles and doubles draws	(Chinese Taipei) Huang Tsung-hao (Japan) Seita Watanabe; 6–2, 6–3	(Australia) Chase Ferguson (China) Yang Mingyuan	(Australia) Omar Jasika (Japan) Akira Santillan	(China) Wang Xiaofei (Kazakhstan) Denis Yevseyev (Australia) Chase Ferguson; Marat Sharipov
September 15	Takasaki, Japan; Hard; M25; Singles and doubles draws	(Japan) Kaichi Uchida; 6–4, 6–3	(Japan) Hikaru Shiraishi	(Japan) Takuya Kumasaka (South Korea) Shin San-hui	(Japan) Jumpei Yamasaki (Japan) Kokoro Isomura (Japan) Yusuke Takahashi (Japan) Sora Fukuda
September 15	Takasaki, Japan; Hard; M25; Singles and doubles draws	(Japan) Keisuke Saitoh (Japan) Taiyo Yamanaka; 7–6^{(7–4)}, 4–6, [10–8]	(Japan) Yuto Oki (Japan) Leo Vithoontien	(Japan) Takuya Kumasaka (South Korea) Shin San-hui	(Japan) Jumpei Yamasaki (Japan) Kokoro Isomura (Japan) Yusuke Takahashi (Japan) Sora Fukuda
September 15	Setúbal, Portugal; Hard; M25; Singles and doubles draws	(Netherlands) Alec Deckers; 3–6, 6–4, 6–3	(Spain) Mario González Fernández	(United Kingdom) Ryan Peniston (Spain) Rafael Izquierdo Luque	(Mexico) Alex Hernández (United States) Dali Blanch (Greece) Aristotelis Thanos (United Kingdom) Henry Searle
September 15	Setúbal, Portugal; Hard; M25; Singles and doubles draws	(United Kingdom) Lui Maxted (United Kingdom) Connor Thomson; 6–3, 6–4	(Spain) Rafael Izquierdo Luque (Portugal) Francisco Rocha	(United Kingdom) Ryan Peniston (Spain) Rafael Izquierdo Luque	(Mexico) Alex Hernández (United States) Dali Blanch (Greece) Aristotelis Thanos (United Kingdom) Henry Searle
September 15	Nevers, France; Hard (i); M25; Singles and doubles draws	(Estonia) Daniil Glinka; 6–2, 6–4	(France) Maxence Beaugé	(France) Loann Massard (France) Cyril Vandermeersch	(Netherlands) Niels Visker (France) Simon Reveniau (Sweden) Karl Friberg (France) Louis Larue
September 15	Nevers, France; Hard (i); M25; Singles and doubles draws	(France) Maxence Beaugé (France) Axel Garcian; 5–7, 6–4, [10–7]	(United Kingdom) Liam Hignett (United Kingdom) James Story	(France) Loann Massard (France) Cyril Vandermeersch	(Netherlands) Niels Visker (France) Simon Reveniau (Sweden) Karl Friberg (France) Louis Larue
September 15	Santa Margherita di Pula, Italy; Clay; M25; Singles and doubles draws	(Italy) Lorenzo Sciahbasi; 6–4, 7–5	(Italy) Michele Ribecai	(Belgium) Gilles-Arnaud Bailly (Italy) Gianmarco Ferrari	(Germany) Mika Petkovic (Italy) Federico Iannaccone (Italy) Alexander Weis (Spain) Pol Martín Tiffon
September 15	Santa Margherita di Pula, Italy; Clay; M25; Singles and doubles draws	(Germany) Mika Petkovic (Italy) Alexander Weis; 6–2, 6–4	(Italy) Federico Iannaccone (Italy) Giorgio Tabacco	(Belgium) Gilles-Arnaud Bailly (Italy) Gianmarco Ferrari	(Germany) Mika Petkovic (Italy) Federico Iannaccone (Italy) Alexander Weis (Spain) Pol Martín Tiffon
September 15	Londrina, Brazil; Clay; M25; Singles and doubles draws	(Paraguay) Daniel Vallejo; 6–4, 4–6, 6–3	(Brazil) Gustavo Heide	(Brazil) Pedro Sakamoto (Brazil) Igor Gimemez	(Colombia) Salvador Price (Argentina) Juan Estévez (United States) Bruno Kuzuhara (Brazil) Matheus Pucinelli de Almeida
September 15	Londrina, Brazil; Clay; M25; Singles and doubles draws	(Brazil) José Pereira (Brazil) Paulo André Saraiva dos Santos; 6–2, 6–4	(Brazil) Enzo Kohlmann de Freitas (Brazil) Gabriel Roveri Sidney	(Brazil) Pedro Sakamoto (Brazil) Igor Gimemez	(Colombia) Salvador Price (Argentina) Juan Estévez (United States) Bruno Kuzuhara (Brazil) Matheus Pucinelli de Almeida
September 15	Melilla, Spain; Clay; M15; Singles and doubles draws	(Spain) Pedro Vives Marcos; 6–2, 6–3	(Brazil) João Victor Couto Loureiro	(Spain) Alejandro Turriziani Álvarez (Turkey) Toprak Avcıbaşı	Ivan Gakhov (Switzerland) Jeffrey von der Schulenburg (Italy) Maximilian Figl (Poland) Jasza Szajrych
September 15	Melilla, Spain; Clay; M15; Singles and doubles draws	(Spain) Pedro Vives Marcos (Switzerland) Jeffrey von der Schulenburg; 6–3, 6–2	(Spain) Alvaro Bueno Gil (Spain) Jordi García Mestre	(Spain) Alejandro Turriziani Álvarez (Turkey) Toprak Avcıbaşı	Ivan Gakhov (Switzerland) Jeffrey von der Schulenburg (Italy) Maximilian Figl (Poland) Jasza Szajrych
September 15	Kuršumlijska Banja, Serbia; Clay; M15; Singles and doubles draws	(United Kingdom) Felix Gill; 3–6, 6–3, 6–4	(Hungary) Máté Valkusz	(Serbia) Branko Đurić; Andrey Chepelev	(Germany) Michel Hopp (Germany) Marlon Vankan (Serbia) Marko Maksimović (Italy) Andrea Fiorentini
September 15	Kuršumlijska Banja, Serbia; Clay; M15; Singles and doubles draws	Anton Arzhankin (Canada) Benjamin Thomas George; 6–3, 6–2	(Argentina) Fermín Tenti (Germany) Marlon Vankan	(Serbia) Branko Đurić; Andrey Chepelev	(Germany) Michel Hopp (Germany) Marlon Vankan (Serbia) Marko Maksimović (Italy) Andrea Fiorentini
September 15	Kayseri, Turkiye; Hard; M15; Singles and doubles draws	(Spain) Iván Marrero Curbelo; 5–7, 6–4, 6–2	(France) Constantin Bittoun Kouzmine	(United Kingdom) Matthew Summers; Semen Pankin	(Germany) Max Wiskandt (France) Nicolas Tepmahc (Netherlands) Daniel de Jonge (United States) Maxwell Exsted
September 15	Kayseri, Turkiye; Hard; M15; Singles and doubles draws	(United States) Maxwell Exsted (Spain) Iván Marrero Curbelo; 6–2, 4–6, [10–7]	(France) Constantin Bittoun Kouzmine; Semen Pankin	(United Kingdom) Matthew Summers; Semen Pankin	(Germany) Max Wiskandt (France) Nicolas Tepmahc (Netherlands) Daniel de Jonge (United States) Maxwell Exsted
September 15	Hurghada, Egypt; Hard; M15; Singles and doubles draws	(United Kingdom) Toby Samuel; 6–1, 6–2	(United Kingdom) Liam Broady	(Egypt) Karim Ibrahim (South Africa) Kris Van Wyk	(Turkey) Ergi Kırkın (Turkey) Emirhan Bulut (Germany) David Eichenseher; Timofei Derepasko
September 15	Hurghada, Egypt; Hard; M15; Singles and doubles draws	Timofei Derepasko (United Kingdom) Viktor Frydrych; 6–3, 6–3	(Germany) David Eichenseher (Austria) Michael Glöckler	(Egypt) Karim Ibrahim (South Africa) Kris Van Wyk	(Turkey) Ergi Kırkın (Turkey) Emirhan Bulut (Germany) David Eichenseher; Timofei Derepasko
September 15	Monastir, Tunisia; Hard; M15; Singles and doubles draws	(Turkey) Mert Alkaya; 6–0, 1–0 ret.	(Spain) Sergio Callejon Hernando	(Sweden) John Hallquist Lithen (France) Benjamin Pietri	(Algeria) Samir Hamza Reguig (Spain) John Echevarria (Germany) Luca Wiedenmann (Algeria) Toufik Sahtali
September 15	Monastir, Tunisia; Hard; M15; Singles and doubles draws	(Denmark) Oskar Brostrøm Poulsen (Sweden) Nikola Slavic; 6–4, 3–6, [10–6]	(Sweden) Oliver Johansson (New Zealand) Anton Shepp	(Sweden) John Hallquist Lithen (France) Benjamin Pietri	(Algeria) Samir Hamza Reguig (Spain) John Echevarria (Germany) Luca Wiedenmann (Algeria) Toufik Sahtali
September 15	Fayetteville, United States; Hard; M15; Singles and doubles draws	(Mexico) Luis Carlos Álvarez; 6–3, 4–6, 6–3	(United States) Keegan Smith	(France) Raphael Perot (Sweden) Sebastian Eriksson	(United States) Andrew Fenty (United States) Andrew Kotzen (South Africa) Khololwam Montsi (Spain) Albert Pedrico Kravtsov
September 15	Fayetteville, United States; Hard; M15; Singles and doubles draws	(United Kingdom) James Hopper (United States) Braden Shick; 6–2, 3–6, [11–9]	(Romania) Ioan Alexandru Chiriță (Mexico) Alan Magadán	(France) Raphael Perot (Sweden) Sebastian Eriksson	(United States) Andrew Fenty (United States) Andrew Kotzen (South Africa) Khololwam Montsi (Spain) Albert Pedrico Kravtsov
September 22	Sabadell, Spain; Clay; M25; Singles and doubles draws	(Dominican Republic) Nick Hardt; 6–4, 3–6, 6–2	(Italy) Lorenzo Giustino	(Spain) Nicolás Álvarez Varona; Ivan Gakhov	(Netherlands) Michiel de Krom (Spain) Pedro Vives Marcos (Spain) Carlos Sánchez Jover (Spain) Noah Lopez Cherubino
September 22	Sabadell, Spain; Clay; M25; Singles and doubles draws	(Spain) Pedro Vives Marcos (Spain) Benjamín Winter López; 2–6, 6–4, [10–1]	(Belgium) Buvaysar Gadamauri (Germany) John Sperle	(Spain) Nicolás Álvarez Varona; Ivan Gakhov	(Netherlands) Michiel de Krom (Spain) Pedro Vives Marcos (Spain) Carlos Sánchez Jover (Spain) Noah Lopez Cherubino
September 22	Santa Margherita di Pula, Italy; Clay; M25; Singles and doubles draws	(Italy) Jacopo Berrettini; 6–1, 7–5	(Poland) Daniel Michalski	(Ukraine) Oleksii Krutykh (Italy) Tommaso Compagnucci	(Italy) Federico Iannaccone (Italy) Jacopo Bilardo (Italy) Giovanni Oradini (Italy) Michele Ribecai
September 22	Santa Margherita di Pula, Italy; Clay; M25; Singles and doubles draws	(Italy) Federico Iannaccone (Italy) Giorgio Tabacco; Walkover	(Italy) Filippo Romano (Italy) Alexander Weis	(Ukraine) Oleksii Krutykh (Italy) Tommaso Compagnucci	(Italy) Federico Iannaccone (Italy) Jacopo Bilardo (Italy) Giovanni Oradini (Italy) Michele Ribecai
September 22	Pardubice, Czech Republic; Clay; M25; Singles and doubles draws	(Czech Republic) Martin Krumich; 6–2, 6–4	(Czech Republic) Maxim Mrva	(Czech Republic) Tadeáš Paroulek (Czech Republic) Jan Kumstát	(Czech Republic) Dominik Reček (Czech Republic) Stepan Baum (Czech Republic) Matthew William Donald (Germany) Marvin Möller
September 22	Pardubice, Czech Republic; Clay; M25; Singles and doubles draws	(Czech Republic) Dominik Reček (Czech Republic) Daniel Siniakov; 6–2, 1–6, [12–10]	(Czech Republic) Matthew William Donald (Czech Republic) Tadeáš Paroulek	(Czech Republic) Tadeáš Paroulek (Czech Republic) Jan Kumstát	(Czech Republic) Dominik Reček (Czech Republic) Stepan Baum (Czech Republic) Matthew William Donald (Germany) Marvin Möller
September 22	Falun, Sweden; Hard (i); M25; Singles and doubles draws	(United Kingdom) George Loffhagen; 6–3, 6–3	(Finland) Eero Vasa	(Sweden) Nikola Slavic (Denmark) Carl Emil Overbeck	(Netherlands) Mees Röttgering (Sweden) Patrik Munkhammar (United Kingdom) Aidan McHugh (Spain) Iñaki Montes de la Torre
September 22	Falun, Sweden; Hard (i); M25; Singles and doubles draws	(Denmark) Benjamin Hannestad (Denmark) Carl Emil Overbeck; 4–6, 7–6^{(10–8)}, [10–7]	(Norway) Herman Hoeyeraal (Spain) Iñaki Montes de la Torre	(Sweden) Nikola Slavic (Denmark) Carl Emil Overbeck	(Netherlands) Mees Röttgering (Sweden) Patrik Munkhammar (United Kingdom) Aidan McHugh (Spain) Iñaki Montes de la Torre
September 22	Zlatibor, Serbia; Clay; M25; Singles and doubles draws	(Bosnia and Herzegovina) Nerman Fatić; 7–5, 6–3	(Serbia) Dušan Obradović	Andrey Chepelev (Serbia) Stefan Popović	(United Kingdom) Felix Gill (Serbia) Marko Maksimović (Ukraine) Vladyslav Orlov (Bosnia and Herzegovina) Andrej Nedić
September 22	Zlatibor, Serbia; Clay; M25; Singles and doubles draws	(Bosnia and Herzegovina) Andrej Nedić (Bosnia and Herzegovina) Vladan Tadić; 6–3, 2–6, [10–8]	(Argentina) Tomás Farjat (Argentina) Fermín Tenti	Andrey Chepelev (Serbia) Stefan Popović	(United Kingdom) Felix Gill (Serbia) Marko Maksimović (Ukraine) Vladyslav Orlov (Bosnia and Herzegovina) Andrej Nedić
September 22	Sharm El Sheikh, Egypt; Hard; M25; Singles and doubles draws	(Italy) Fabrizio Andaloro; 4–6, 6–3, 6–4	(France) Robin Bertrand	(India) Mukund Sasikumar (Georgia (country)) Aleksandre Bakshi	(Ukraine) Vadym Ursu (Egypt) Michael Bassem Sobhy (Ukraine) Yurii Dzhavakian; Daniil Ostapenkov
September 22	Sharm El Sheikh, Egypt; Hard; M25; Singles and doubles draws	(United Kingdom) James MacKinlay (United Kingdom) Connor Thomson; 6–1, 6–2	(Italy) Alessandro Coccioli (Italy) Lorenzo Lorusso	(India) Mukund Sasikumar (Georgia (country)) Aleksandre Bakshi	(Ukraine) Vadym Ursu (Egypt) Michael Bassem Sobhy (Ukraine) Yurii Dzhavakian; Daniil Ostapenkov
September 22	Barueri, Brazil; Hard; M25; Singles and doubles draws	(Ecuador) Andrés Andrade; 6–4, 6–3	(Brazil) Gustavo Heide	(Brazil) João Eduardo Schiessl (Argentina) Facundo Mena	(United States) Bruno Kuzuhara (Brazil) Pedro Sakamoto (Brazil) Natan Rodrigues (Brazil) Igor Gimemez
September 22	Barueri, Brazil; Hard; M25; Singles and doubles draws	(Brazil) Igor Marcondes (Brazil) Gabriel Roveri Sidney; 6–4, 7–6^{(7–2)}	(Brazil) Ryan Augusto dos Santos (Brazil) João Eduardo Schiessl	(Brazil) João Eduardo Schiessl (Argentina) Facundo Mena	(United States) Bruno Kuzuhara (Brazil) Pedro Sakamoto (Brazil) Natan Rodrigues (Brazil) Igor Gimemez
September 22	Forbach, France; Carpet (i); M15; Singles and doubles draws	(Germany) Calvin Müller; 5–7, 7–6^{(8–6)}, 6–4	(Germany) Tom Zeuch	(Italy) Andrea Guerrieri (France) Alexis Gautier	(France) Arthur Nagel (Germany) Noah Thurner (France) Adrien Gobat (Germany) Sydney Zick
September 22	Forbach, France; Carpet (i); M15; Singles and doubles draws	(France) Axel Garcian (France) Arthur Nagel; 6–7^{(3–7)}, 6–1, [10–8]	(Germany) Kai Wehnelt (Germany) Tom Zeuch	(Italy) Andrea Guerrieri (France) Alexis Gautier	(France) Arthur Nagel (Germany) Noah Thurner (France) Adrien Gobat (Germany) Sydney Zick
September 22	Slovenj Gradec, Slovenia; Clay; M15; Singles and doubles draws	Kirill Kivattsev; 7–5, 6–4	(Belgium) Martin van der Meerschen	(Austria) Piet Luis Pinter (Italy) Juan Cruz Martin Manzano	(Germany) Maximilian Homberg (Italy) Samuele Pieri (Italy) Giuseppe La Vela (Italy) Gabriele Bosio
September 22	Slovenj Gradec, Slovenia; Clay; M15; Singles and doubles draws	(Germany) Maximilian Homberg (Belgium) Martin van der Meerschen; 7–6^{(7–4)}, 6–4	(Luxembourg) Aaron Gil Garcia (Croatia) Antonio Voljavec	(Austria) Piet Luis Pinter (Italy) Juan Cruz Martin Manzano	(Germany) Maximilian Homberg (Italy) Samuele Pieri (Italy) Giuseppe La Vela (Italy) Gabriele Bosio
September 22	Budapest, Hungary; Hard; M15; Singles and doubles draws	(United Kingdom) Liam Broady; 6–2, 6–1	(Hungary) Matyas Fuele	(Ukraine) Nikita Bilozertsev (Spain) Sergio Callejón Hernando	(Ukraine) Georgii Kravchenko (United States) Tyler Stice (France) Guillaume Dalmasso (United States) Michael Zhu
September 22	Budapest, Hungary; Hard; M15; Singles and doubles draws	(Bulgaria) Anthony Genov (United States) Enzo Wallart; 7–5, 4–6, [10–5]	(Hungary) Matyas Fuele (Venezuela) Brandon Pérez	(Ukraine) Nikita Bilozertsev (Spain) Sergio Callejón Hernando	(Ukraine) Georgii Kravchenko (United States) Tyler Stice (France) Guillaume Dalmasso (United States) Michael Zhu
September 22	Otopeni, Romania; Clay; M15; Singles and doubles draws	(Romania) Ștefan Paloși; 6–4, 0–6, 6–4	(Netherlands) Stijn Paardekooper	(Romania) Filip Cristian Jianu (Italy) Niccolò Catini	(Romania) Ștefan Adrian Andreescu (Germany) Niklas Guttau (Romania) Dan Alexandru Tomescu (Romania) Gabi Adrian Boitan
September 22	Otopeni, Romania; Clay; M15; Singles and doubles draws	(Italy) Niccolò Catini (Italy) Noah Perfetti; 6–2, 7–6^{(7–4)}	Uladzimir Ignatik (Romania) Rareș Teodor Pieleanu	(Romania) Filip Cristian Jianu (Italy) Niccolò Catini	(Romania) Ștefan Adrian Andreescu (Germany) Niklas Guttau (Romania) Dan Alexandru Tomescu (Romania) Gabi Adrian Boitan
September 22	Kayseri, Turkiye; Hard; M15; Singles and doubles draws	(Spain) Iván Marrero Curbelo; 7–6^{(7–3)}, 6–3	(United Kingdom) Matthew Summers	(United States) Phillip Jordan (France) Constantin Bittoun Kouzmine	Roman Kharlamov (France) Nicolas Tepmahc; Semen Pankin (Ukraine) Aleksandre Braynin
September 22	Kayseri, Turkiye; Hard; M15; Singles and doubles draws	(United States) Phillip Jordan (United Kingdom) Joe Tyler; 6–4, 3–6, [11–9]	(France) Constantin Bittoun Kouzmine (Spain) Iván Marrero Curbelo	(United States) Phillip Jordan (France) Constantin Bittoun Kouzmine	Roman Kharlamov (France) Nicolas Tepmahc; Semen Pankin (Ukraine) Aleksandre Braynin
September 22	Heraklion, Greece; Hard; M15; Singles and doubles draws	(Greece) Ioannis Xilas; 6–2, 6–3	(Germany) Nino Ehrenschneider	(United States) Miles Jones (Slovenia) Filip Jeff Planinšek	(United Kingdom) Ryan James Storrie (Greece) Dimitris Sakellaridis (Australia) Jacob Bradshaw (United Kingdom) Finn Murgett
September 22	Heraklion, Greece; Hard; M15; Singles and doubles draws	(United Kingdom) Finn Murgett (United Kingdom) Marcus Walters; 6–1, 6–4	(United Kingdom) Matthew Howse (United Kingdom) Joel Pierleoni	(United States) Miles Jones (Slovenia) Filip Jeff Planinšek	(United Kingdom) Ryan James Storrie (Greece) Dimitris Sakellaridis (Australia) Jacob Bradshaw (United Kingdom) Finn Murgett
September 22	Monastir, Tunisia; Hard; M15; Singles and doubles draws	(Turkey) Mert Alkaya; 6–1, 6–4	(Italy) Massimo Giunta	(Sweden) John Hallquist Lithen (Germany) Luca Wiedenmann	(Algeria) Samir Hamza Reguig (Senegal) Seydina André (Syria) Hazem Naw (Kazakhstan) Amir Omarkhanov
September 22	Monastir, Tunisia; Hard; M15; Singles and doubles draws	(Germany) Nikolai Barsukov (Germany) Max Schönhaus; 7–6^{(9–7)}, 3–6, [10–3]	(Lithuania) Ainius Sabaliauskas (Italy) Samuele Seghetti	(Sweden) John Hallquist Lithen (Germany) Luca Wiedenmann	(Algeria) Samir Hamza Reguig (Senegal) Seydina André (Syria) Hazem Naw (Kazakhstan) Amir Omarkhanov
September 22	Ann Arbor, United States; Hard; M15; Singles and doubles draws	(France) Raphael Perot; 6–2, 6–1	(United Kingdom) Oliver Okonkwo	(United States) Alexander Kotzen (Sweden) Max Dahlin	(United States) Keegan Smith (Spain) Matias Ponce de Leon Gomila (United States) Evan Bynoe (United States) Jack Satterfield
September 22	Ann Arbor, United States; Hard; M15; Singles and doubles draws	(Sweden) Max Dahlin (United States) Bjorn Swenson; 6–3, 6–4	(United States) Arnav Bhandari (Turkey) Mert Oral	(United States) Alexander Kotzen (Sweden) Max Dahlin	(United States) Keegan Smith (Spain) Matias Ponce de Leon Gomila (United States) Evan Bynoe (United States) Jack Satterfield
September 29	Perth, Australia; Hard; M25; Singles and doubles draws	(Australia) Dane Sweeny; 6–1, 6–3	(Australia) Scott Jones	(Australia) Pavle Marinkov (United Kingdom) Emile Hudd	(Australia) Enzo Aguiard (Northern Mariana Islands) Colin Sinclair (Australia) Tai Sach (Japan) Shinji Hazawa
September 29	Perth, Australia; Hard; M25; Singles and doubles draws	(Australia) Calum Puttergill (Australia) Dane Sweeny; 6–4, 6–7^{(6–8)}, [10–1]	(Australia) Chen Dong (Poland) Filip Peliwo	(Australia) Pavle Marinkov (United Kingdom) Emile Hudd	(Australia) Enzo Aguiard (Northern Mariana Islands) Colin Sinclair (Australia) Tai Sach (Japan) Shinji Hazawa
September 29	Zaragoza, Spain; Clay; M25; Singles and doubles draws	(Italy) Lorenzo Giustino; 6–4, 1–6, 6–3	(Spain) Pedro Vives Marcos	(Czech Republic) Martin Krumich; Ivan Gakhov	(South Korea) Gerard Campaña Lee (Spain) Miguel Damas (Romania) Yannick Theodor Alexandrescou (Netherlands) Ryan Nijboer
September 29	Zaragoza, Spain; Clay; M25; Singles and doubles draws	(Spain) Álvaro Bueno Gil (Bulgaria) Yanaki Milev; 6–4, 6–4	(Spain) Alvaro Jimenez (Spain) Keoni Puig McCallan	(Czech Republic) Martin Krumich; Ivan Gakhov	(South Korea) Gerard Campaña Lee (Spain) Miguel Damas (Romania) Yannick Theodor Alexandrescou (Netherlands) Ryan Nijboer
September 29	Santa Margherita di Pula, Italy; Clay; M25; Singles and doubles draws	(Poland) Daniel Michalski; 6–3, 7–5	(Italy) Michele Ribecai	(Italy) Gianluca Cadenasso (Italy) Gabriele Piraino	(Italy) Jacopo Berrettini (Slovakia) Andrej Martin (Italy) Alexander Weis (Italy) Tommaso Compagnucci
September 29	Santa Margherita di Pula, Italy; Clay; M25; Singles and doubles draws	(Italy) Gabriele Crivellaro (Italy) Giovanni Oradini; 7–6^{(7–5)}, 6–4	(United Kingdom) Harry Rock (United Kingdom) Mark Whitehouse	(Italy) Gianluca Cadenasso (Italy) Gabriele Piraino	(Italy) Jacopo Berrettini (Slovakia) Andrej Martin (Italy) Alexander Weis (Italy) Tommaso Compagnucci
September 29	Sharm El Sheikh, Egypt; Hard; M25; Singles and doubles draws	(Egypt) Amr Elsayed; 4–6, 6–2, 7–6^{(7–5)}	(Italy) Fabrizio Andaloro	Daniil Ostapenkov (Turkey) Koray Kırcı	(Romania) Tudor Batin (Sweden) Leo Borg (India) Mukund Sasikumar (Georgia (country)) Aleksandre Bakshi
September 29	Sharm El Sheikh, Egypt; Hard; M25; Singles and doubles draws	(United Kingdom) James MacKinlay (United Kingdom) Connor Thomson; 6–7^{(4–7)}, 6–4, [10–8]	Sergey Betov; Daniil Ostapenkov	Daniil Ostapenkov (Turkey) Koray Kırcı	(Romania) Tudor Batin (Sweden) Leo Borg (India) Mukund Sasikumar (Georgia (country)) Aleksandre Bakshi
September 29	Salvador, Brazil; Hard; M25; Singles and doubles draws	(Ecuador) Andrés Andrade; 6–1, 6–1	(Morocco) Taha Baadi	(Brazil) Pedro Sakamoto (Brazil) João Eduardo Schiessl	(Brazil) Natan Rodrigues (Mexico) Alan Fernando Rubio Fierros (Brazil) Gustavo Albieri (Brazil) Wilson Leite
September 29	Salvador, Brazil; Hard; M25; Singles and doubles draws	(Brazil) Natan Rodrigues (Brazil) Gabriel Roveri Sidney; 7–6^{(7–4)}, 7–5	(Brazil) Rafael Tosetto (Brazil) Nicolas Zanellato	(Brazil) Pedro Sakamoto (Brazil) João Eduardo Schiessl	(Brazil) Natan Rodrigues (Mexico) Alan Fernando Rubio Fierros (Brazil) Gustavo Albieri (Brazil) Wilson Leite
September 29	Kayseri, Turkiye; Hard; M15; Singles and doubles draws	(France) Constantin Bittoun Kouzmine; 6–4, 6–3	(Germany) Kai Wehnelt	(Ukraine) Aleksandr Braynin; Semen Pankin	(Republic of Ireland) Peter Buldorini (United Kingdom) Matthew Summers (Saudi Arabia) Ammar Alhogbani (Guatemala) Juan Sebastian Dominguez Collado
September 29	Kayseri, Turkiye; Hard; M15; Singles and doubles draws	(Kazakhstan) Grigoriy Lomakin (Germany) Kai Wehnelt; 6–0, 3–2 ret.	(France) Constantin Bittoun Kouzmine (United Kingdom) Stefan Cooper	(Ukraine) Aleksandr Braynin; Semen Pankin	(Republic of Ireland) Peter Buldorini (United Kingdom) Matthew Summers (Saudi Arabia) Ammar Alhogbani (Guatemala) Juan Sebastian Dominguez Collado
September 29	Heraklion, Greece; Hard; M15; Singles and doubles draws	(Greece) Ioannis Xilas; 3–6, 6–2, 6–4	(Germany) Nino Ehrenschneider	(Slovenia) Žiga Šeško (Switzerland) Luca Staeheli	(Japan) Yuta Kawahashi (United Kingdom) Marcus Walters (Colombia) Daniel Salazar (Slovenia) Filip Jeff Planinšek
September 29	Heraklion, Greece; Hard; M15; Singles and doubles draws	(France) Felix Balshaw (United States) Jeffrey Fradkin; 6–1, 6–4	(United Kingdom) Matthew Howse (United Kingdom) Joel Pierleoni	(Slovenia) Žiga Šeško (Switzerland) Luca Staeheli	(Japan) Yuta Kawahashi (United Kingdom) Marcus Walters (Colombia) Daniel Salazar (Slovenia) Filip Jeff Planinšek
September 29	Monastir, Tunisia; Hard; M15; Singles and doubles draws	(Germany) Max Schönhaus; 7–6^{(7–0)}, 6–3	(France) Yanis Ghazouani Durand	(Italy) Massimo Giunta (Netherlands) Pieter De Lange	(Czech Republic) Jakub Nicod (Switzerland) Patrick Schoen (France) Adan Freire da Silva (Estonia) Markus Mölder
September 29	Monastir, Tunisia; Hard; M15; Singles and doubles draws	(Czech Republic) Jan Kumstát (Poland) Piotr Pawlak; 7–5, 6–3	(France) Adan Freire da Silva (France) Yanis Ghazouani Durand	(Italy) Massimo Giunta (Netherlands) Pieter De Lange	(Czech Republic) Jakub Nicod (Switzerland) Patrick Schoen (France) Adan Freire da Silva (Estonia) Markus Mölder
September 29	Winston-Salem, United States; Hard; M15; Singles and doubles draws	(India) Dhakshineswar Suresh; 6–0, 6–3	(Japan) Shunsuke Mitsui	(United Kingdom) Luca Pow; Martin Borisiouk	(China) Xu Kuangqing (France) Romain Gales (Dominican Republic) Peter Bertran (Brazil) Pedro Rodrigues
September 29	Winston-Salem, United States; Hard; M15; Singles and doubles draws	(United States) Andrew Delgado (India) Dhakshineswar Suresh; 6–7^{(3–7)}, 6–2, [10–6]	(Brazil) Lucas Andrade da Silva (France) Paul Barbier Gazeu	(United Kingdom) Luca Pow; Martin Borisiouk	(China) Xu Kuangqing (France) Romain Gales (Dominican Republic) Peter Bertran (Brazil) Pedro Rodrigues
