= 2026 ITF Men's World Tennis Tour (July–September) =

The 2026 Men's World Tennis Tour is the 2026 edition of the third-tier tour for men's professional tennis. It is organised by World Tennis (known as the International Tennis Federation until June 2026) and is a tier below the ATP Challenger Tour. The Men's World Tennis Tour includes tournaments with prize money ranging from $15,000 to $25,000.

Since 2022, following the Russian invasion of Ukraine World Tennis announced that players from Belarus and Russia could still play on the tour but would not be allowed to play under the flag of Belarus or Russia.

== Key ==
M25 tournaments
M15 tournaments

== Month ==
=== July ===
Week of	Tournament	Winner	Runners-up	Semifinalists	Quarterfinalists
July 6	Roda de Berà, Spain; Hard; M25; Singles and doubles draws	(Turkey) Yankı Erel; 6–0, 6–2	(United Kingdom) Oliver Crawford	(Turkey) Aren Baybars (France) Dan Added	(Italy) Ludovico Vaccari (Bulgaria) Iliyan Radulov (New Zealand) Isaac Becroft (France) Robin Bertrand
July 6	Roda de Berà, Spain; Hard; M25; Singles and doubles draws	(Spain) Albert Pedrico Kravtsov (Bulgaria) Iliyan Radulov; 6–3, 4–6, [10–6]	(Spain) Manel Lazaro Juncadella (Spain) Iker Urribarrens Ramírez	(Turkey) Aren Baybars (France) Dan Added	(Italy) Ludovico Vaccari (Bulgaria) Iliyan Radulov (New Zealand) Isaac Becroft (France) Robin Bertrand
July 6	Bastia-Lucciana, France; Clay; M25+H; Singles and doubles draws	(France) Laurent Lokoli; 6–3, 6–1	(France) Yanis Ghazouani Durand	(France) Florent Bax (Italy) Alexander Weis	(France) Nicolas Jadoun (Mexico) Rodrigo Alujas (France) Cosme Rolland de Ravel (Italy) Denis Spiridon
July 6	Bastia-Lucciana, France; Clay; M25+H; Singles and doubles draws	(Italy) Simone Agostini (Italy) Leonardo Taddia; 7–6^{(7–1)}, 3–6, [10–8]	(France) Axel Garcian (France) Yanis Ghazouani Durand	(France) Florent Bax (Italy) Alexander Weis	(France) Nicolas Jadoun (Mexico) Rodrigo Alujas (France) Cosme Rolland de Ravel (Italy) Denis Spiridon
July 6	The Hague, Netherlands; Clay; M25; Singles and doubles draws	(Germany) Louis Wessels; 6–1, 6–2	(Spain) Alejandro Juan Mano	(Germany) Yannik Kelm (Czech Republic) Jakub Nicod	(Netherlands) Stijn Paardekooper (Netherlands) Abel Forger (Netherlands) Pieter de Lange (Netherlands) Sander Jong
July 6	The Hague, Netherlands; Clay; M25; Singles and doubles draws	(Netherlands) Mac Visser (Netherlands) Lars Wagenaar; 7–5, 6–2	(Netherlands) Brian Bozemoj (Netherlands) Stijn Pel	(Germany) Yannik Kelm (Czech Republic) Jakub Nicod	(Netherlands) Stijn Paardekooper (Netherlands) Abel Forger (Netherlands) Pieter de Lange (Netherlands) Sander Jong
July 6	Kassel, Germany; Clay; M25+H; Singles and doubles draws	(Germany) Max Wiskandt; 7–5, 6–3	(Czech Republic) Matthew William Donald	(Germany) Adrian Oetzbach (Czech Republic) Dominik Reček	(Greece) Ioannis Xilas (Czech Republic) Daniel Siniakov (Italy) Giorgio Tabacco (United Kingdom) Anton Matusevich
July 6	Kassel, Germany; Clay; M25+H; Singles and doubles draws	(Czech Republic) Dominik Reček (Czech Republic) Daniel Siniakov; 6–4, 6–3	(India) Sai Karteek Reddy Ganta (India) Aryan Shah	(Germany) Adrian Oetzbach (Czech Republic) Dominik Reček	(Greece) Ioannis Xilas (Czech Republic) Daniel Siniakov (Italy) Giorgio Tabacco (United Kingdom) Anton Matusevich
July 6	Laval, Canada; Hard; M25; Singles and doubles draws	(Japan) Kenta Miyoshi; 2–6, 7–5, 6–2	(Canada) Keegan Rice	(Japan) Jay Friend (France) Timo Legout	(Canada) Liam Draxl (United States) Strong Kirchheimer (United States) Karl Poling (Canada) Mikael Arseneault
July 6	Laval, Canada; Hard; M25; Singles and doubles draws	(Japan) Jay Friend (Canada) Alexander Rozin; 7–6^{(7–2)}, 6–7^{(4–7)}, [10–4]	(Canada) Duncan Chan (Canada) Keegan Rice	(Japan) Jay Friend (France) Timo Legout	(Canada) Liam Draxl (United States) Strong Kirchheimer (United States) Karl Poling (Canada) Mikael Arseneault
July 6	Dallas, United States; Hard (i); M25; Singles and doubles draws	(United States) Trevor Svajda; 6–3, 6–2	(United States) Aidan Kim	(United States) Gavin Young (United States) Evan Zhu	(United States) Mitchell Krueger (United States) Bruno Kuzuhara (United States) Matthew Forbes (United States) Landon Ardila
July 6	Dallas, United States; Hard (i); M25; Singles and doubles draws	(France) Jules Leroux (United States) William Manning; 6–4, 6–2	(United States) Nathan Cox (Mexico) Eugenio González Fitzmaurice	(United States) Gavin Young (United States) Evan Zhu	(United States) Mitchell Krueger (United States) Bruno Kuzuhara (United States) Matthew Forbes (United States) Landon Ardila
July 6	Tokyo, Japan; Hard; M15; Singles and doubles draws	(Australia) Omar Jasika; 4–6, 6–0, 6–1	(Japan) Koki Matsuda	(Australia) Matthew Dellavedova (Japan) Naoki Nakagawa	(Japan) Taiyo Yamanaka (Japan) Yuki Mochizuki (Japan) Shintaro Imai (Japan) Makoto Ochi
July 6	Tokyo, Japan; Hard; M15; Singles and doubles draws	(Japan) Taisei Ichikawa (Japan) Masakatsu Noguchi; 6–1, 7–6^{(7–4)}	(Japan) Yusuke Kusuhara (Japan) Shunsuke Nakagawa	(Australia) Matthew Dellavedova (Japan) Naoki Nakagawa	(Japan) Taiyo Yamanaka (Japan) Yuki Mochizuki (Japan) Shintaro Imai (Japan) Makoto Ochi
July 6	Wuning, China; Hard; M15; Singles and doubles draws	Martin Borisiouk; 2–6, 6–4, 6–1	(Sweden) Arvid Nordquist	(South Korea) Roh Ho-young (Japan) Noritaka Koizumi	(China) Liu Hanyi (Armenia) Daniil Sarksian (Indonesia) Muhammad Rifqi Fitriadi (Thailand) James van Herzeele
July 6	Wuning, China; Hard; M15; Singles and doubles draws	(China) Yang Zijiang (China) Zeng Yaojie; 6–4, 7–6^{(7–5)}	(Indonesia) Muhammad Rifqi Fitriadi (South Korea) Lee Duck-hee	(South Korea) Roh Ho-young (Japan) Noritaka Koizumi	(China) Liu Hanyi (Armenia) Daniil Sarksian (Indonesia) Muhammad Rifqi Fitriadi (Thailand) James van Herzeele
July 6	Łódź, Poland; Clay; M15; Singles and doubles draws	(Finland) Linus Lagerbohm; 6–3, 7–6^{(7–5)}	(Spain) Imanol López Morillo	(Ukraine) Vladyslav Orlov (Norway) Leyton Rivera	(Greece) Petros Tsitsipas (Italy) Lorenzo Balducci (Italy) Leonardo Rossi (Poland) Jakub Jędrzejczak
July 6	Łódź, Poland; Clay; M15; Singles and doubles draws	(Poland) Tomasz Berkieta (Poland) Alan Bojarski; 7–6^{(7–4)}, 4–6, [10–6]	(Finland) Linus Lagerbohm (Poland) Jan Wygona	(Ukraine) Vladyslav Orlov (Norway) Leyton Rivera	(Greece) Petros Tsitsipas (Italy) Lorenzo Balducci (Italy) Leonardo Rossi (Poland) Jakub Jędrzejczak
July 6	Bucharest, Romania; Clay; M15; Singles and doubles draws	(Moldova) Ilya Snițari; 6–4, 6–4	(Romania) Cezar Gabriel Papoe	(Slovenia) Luka Talan Lopatić (Italy) Filippo Mazzola	(Italy) William Mirarchi (Slovenia) Aljaž Jeran (Italy) Niccolò Catini (Romania) Matei Florin Breazu
July 6	Bucharest, Romania; Clay; M15; Singles and doubles draws	(Ukraine) Oleksandr Ovcharenko (Italy) Riccardo Perin; 6–4, 4–6, [10–5]	(Romania) Ștefan Adrian Andreescu (Romania) Gheorghe Claudiu Schinteie	(Slovenia) Luka Talan Lopatić (Italy) Filippo Mazzola	(Italy) William Mirarchi (Slovenia) Aljaž Jeran (Italy) Niccolò Catini (Romania) Matei Florin Breazu
July 6	Kuršumlijska Banja, Serbia; Clay; M15; Singles and doubles	(Serbia) Ognjen Milić; 6–3, 2–6, 6–4	Anton Arzhankin	(Serbia) Niksa Arsić (France) Antoni Fabre	(France) Pierre Delage (Spain) Pedro Vives Marcos (Serbia) Marko Milosavljević (Italy) Sebastiano Cocola
July 6	Kuršumlijska Banja, Serbia; Clay; M15; Singles and doubles	Anton Arzhankin; Semen Pankin; 7–6^{(7–5)}, 5–7, [10–1]	(Serbia) Novak Novaković (Serbia) Tadija Radovanović	(Serbia) Niksa Arsić (France) Antoni Fabre	(France) Pierre Delage (Spain) Pedro Vives Marcos (Serbia) Marko Milosavljević (Italy) Sebastiano Cocola
July 6	Hillcrest, South Africa; Hard; M15; Singles and doubles draws	(South Africa) Khololwam Montsi; 6–3, 6–4	(Israel) Ofek Shimanov	(India) Kriish Tyagi (United Kingdom) Charlie Robertson	(United Kingdom) James Beaven (Hungary) Zsombor Velcz; Alexander Zgirovsky (Netherlands) Alec Deckers
July 6	Hillcrest, South Africa; Hard; M15; Singles and doubles draws	(South Africa) Devin Badenhorst (South Africa) Luc Koenig; 4–6, 6–3, [10–5]	(Italy) Giulio Perego (Monaco) Rocco Piatti	(India) Kriish Tyagi (United Kingdom) Charlie Robertson	(United Kingdom) James Beaven (Hungary) Zsombor Velcz; Alexander Zgirovsky (Netherlands) Alec Deckers
July 6	Monastir, Tunisia; Hard; M15; Singles and doubles draws	(Tunisia) Aziz Dougaz; 7–6^{(7–3)}, 6–2	(Turkey) Tuncay Duran	(France) Paul Barbier Gazeu (France) Nicolas Robert	(United States) Logan Zapp (United Kingdom) Roan Jones (Italy) Felipe Virgili Berini (Sweden) Jonas Eriksson Ziverts
July 6	Monastir, Tunisia; Hard; M15; Singles and doubles draws	Nikita Ianin (Egypt) Karim Mabrouk; 5–7, 6–2, [10–8]	(United Kingdom) Roan Jones (Bulgaria) Viktor Markov	(France) Paul Barbier Gazeu (France) Nicolas Robert	(United States) Logan Zapp (United Kingdom) Roan Jones (Italy) Felipe Virgili Berini (Sweden) Jonas Eriksson Ziverts
July 6	Rancho Santa Fe, United States; Hard; M15; Singles and doubles draws	(United States) Spencer Johnson; 7–6^{(7–2)}, 7–5	(United States) Noah Zamora	(Netherlands) Stian Klaassen (United States) Emon van Loben Sels	(United States) Ronald Hohmann (United States) Jack Anthrop (New Zealand) Reece Falck (United States) Noah Johnston
July 6	Rancho Santa Fe, United States; Hard; M15; Singles and doubles draws	(United States) Alexander Chang (Netherlands) Stian Klaassen; 6–3, 3–6, [10–7]	(United States) Noah Johnston (United States) James Weber	(Netherlands) Stian Klaassen (United States) Emon van Loben Sels	(United States) Ronald Hohmann (United States) Jack Anthrop (New Zealand) Reece Falck (United States) Noah Johnston
July 6	San Salvador de Jujuy, Argentina; Clay; M15; Singles and doubles draws	(Argentina) Carlos Maria Zárate; 6–1, 6–4	(Argentina) Juan Estévez	(Uruguay) Joaquín Aguilar Cardozo (Argentina) Thiago Cigarrán	(Argentina) Felipe de Dios (Chile) Bastián Malla (Brazil) Enzo Kohlmann de Freitas (Argentina) Lorenzo Gagliardo
July 6	San Salvador de Jujuy, Argentina; Clay; M15; Singles and doubles draws	(Brazil) Enzo Kohlmann de Freitas (Argentina) Carlos Maria Zárate; 6–3, 6–2	(Uruguay) Federico Aguilar Cardozo (Uruguay) Joaquín Aguilar Cardozo	(Uruguay) Joaquín Aguilar Cardozo (Argentina) Thiago Cigarrán	(Argentina) Felipe de Dios (Chile) Bastián Malla (Brazil) Enzo Kohlmann de Freitas (Argentina) Lorenzo Gagliardo
July 13	Brisbane, Australia; Hard; M25; Singles and doubles draws	(Australia) Matt Hulme; 7–6^{(7–5)}, 2–6, 7–6^{(11–9)}	(Australia) Jake Delaney	(Australia) Zachary Viiala (Australia) Benjamin O'Connell	(Australia) Jeremy Beale (Northern Mariana Islands) Colin Sinclair (France) Matisse Bobichon (Australia) Chase Ferguson
July 13	Brisbane, Australia; Hard; M25; Singles and doubles draws	(Australia) Joshua Charlton (Australia) Matt Hulme; 6–4, 6–4	(Australia) Charlie Camus (New Zealand) Matthew Shearer	(Australia) Zachary Viiala (Australia) Benjamin O'Connell	(Australia) Jeremy Beale (Northern Mariana Islands) Colin Sinclair (France) Matisse Bobichon (Australia) Chase Ferguson
July 13	Gandía, Spain; Clay; M25; Singles and doubles draws	(Ukraine) Eric Vanshelboim; 6–4, 7–6^{(7–3)}	(Spain) Javier Barranco Cosano	(Spain) Pablo Martínez Gómez (Morocco) Reda Bennani	(Spain) Sergi Fita Juan (Spain) Sergi Pérez Contri (Slovenia) Luka Talan Lopatić (Bulgaria) Anas Mazdrashki
July 13	Gandía, Spain; Clay; M25; Singles and doubles draws	(Switzerland) Adrien Burdet (France) Matthieu Chambonniere; 6–3, 4–6, [10–2]	(Australia) Andy Allen (Spain) Joseph Puig McCallan	(Spain) Pablo Martínez Gómez (Morocco) Reda Bennani	(Spain) Sergi Fita Juan (Spain) Sergi Pérez Contri (Slovenia) Luka Talan Lopatić (Bulgaria) Anas Mazdrashki
July 13	Uriage, France; Clay; M25; Singles and doubles draws	(France) Sean Cuenin; 4–6, 6–2, 7–5	(Italy) Alexander Weis	(France) Geoffrey Blancaneaux (France) Daniel Jade	(France) Florent Bax (France) Yanis Ghazouani Durand (Norway) Viktor Durasovic (Germany) Luca Wiedenmann
July 13	Uriage, France; Clay; M25; Singles and doubles draws	(France) Geoffrey Blancaneaux (France) Yanis Ghazouani Durand; 6–4, 6–1	(France) Alexandre Aubriot (France) Sean Cuenin	(France) Geoffrey Blancaneaux (France) Daniel Jade	(France) Florent Bax (France) Yanis Ghazouani Durand (Norway) Viktor Durasovic (Germany) Luca Wiedenmann
July 13	Kramsach, Austria; Clay; M25; Singles and doubles draws	(Ukraine) Vladyslav Orlov; 5–7, 6–3, 6–2	(Germany) Max Wiskandt	(Finland) Oskari Paldanius (Germany) Lambert Ruland	(France) Théo Papamalamis (Austria) Alexander Wagner (Switzerland) Luca Staeheli (Switzerland) Flynn Thomas
July 13	Kramsach, Austria; Clay; M25; Singles and doubles draws	(Finland) Oskari Paldanius (Greece) Petros Tsitsipas; 6–4, 6–2	(Austria) Leo Gutjahr (Austria) Felix Raser	(Finland) Oskari Paldanius (Germany) Lambert Ruland	(France) Théo Papamalamis (Austria) Alexander Wagner (Switzerland) Luca Staeheli (Switzerland) Flynn Thomas
July 13	Hillcrest, South Africa; Hard; M25; Singles and doubles draws	(Israel) Orel Kimhi; 6–1, 6–3	(Hungary) Zsombor Velcz	(Israel) Jordan Hasson (Italy) Giulio Perego	(United Kingdom) Charlie Robertson (Israel) Ofek Shimanov (South Africa) Connor Doig (Cyprus) Andreas Timini
July 13	Hillcrest, South Africa; Hard; M25; Singles and doubles draws	(South Africa) Khololwam Montsi (Hungary) Zsombor Velcz; 7–6^{(8–6)}, 6–3	(United Kingdom) James Beaven (Germany) Tom Zeuch	(Israel) Jordan Hasson (Italy) Giulio Perego	(United Kingdom) Charlie Robertson (Israel) Ofek Shimanov (South Africa) Connor Doig (Cyprus) Andreas Timini
July 13	Louisville, United States; Hard; M25; Singles and doubles draws	(United States) Ozan Baris; 6–3, 6–2	(Netherlands) Mees Röttgering	(France) Timo Legout (Serbia) Aleksa Ćirić	(United States) Evan Bynoe (United States) Alexander Frusina (United States) Maximus Dussault (United Kingdom) Millen Hurrion
July 13	Louisville, United States; Hard; M25; Singles and doubles draws	(United States) J.J. Mercer (United States) Eli Stephenson; 6–2, 6–7^{(4–7)}, [10–6]	(Canada) Adam Farag Cao (Canada) Joshua Peck	(France) Timo Legout (Serbia) Aleksa Ćirić	(United States) Evan Bynoe (United States) Alexander Frusina (United States) Maximus Dussault (United Kingdom) Millen Hurrion
July 13	Wuning, China; Hard; M15; Singles and doubles draws	(Indonesia) Muhammad Rifqi Fitriadi; 6–4, 6–3	(South Korea) Roh Ho-young	(Japan) Asahi Harazaki (South Korea) Kim Jang-jun	(China) Jin Yuquan (Japan) Shu Muto (Thailand) Wishaya Trongcharoenchaikul (Japan) Noritaka Koizumi
July 13	Wuning, China; Hard; M15; Singles and doubles draws	(Indonesia) Muhammad Rifqi Fitriadi (Armenia) Daniil Sarksian; 6–7^{(3–7)}, 7–6^{(7–5)}, [12–10]	(Chinese Taipei) Hsieh Cheng-peng (Chinese Taipei) Lai Chin-kuan	(Japan) Asahi Harazaki (South Korea) Kim Jang-jun	(China) Jin Yuquan (Japan) Shu Muto (Thailand) Wishaya Trongcharoenchaikul (Japan) Noritaka Koizumi
July 13	Castelo Branco, Portugal; Hard; M15; Singles and doubles draws	(Portugal) Tiago Cação; 3–6, 6–2, 7–6^{(7–5)}	(Spain) Pablo Perez Ramos	(United States) Maxwell McKennon (Portugal) Gonçalo Marques	(Greece) Pavlos Tsitsipas (Spain) Rafael Izquierdo Luque (Portugal) Francisco Rocha (Spain) Iker Urribarrens Ramírez
July 13	Castelo Branco, Portugal; Hard; M15; Singles and doubles draws	(Spain) Pablo Perez Ramos (Republic of Ireland) Michael Wright; 6–7^{(2–7)}, 6–3, [10–4]	(Portugal) Rodrigo Leal (Portugal) Salvador Monteiro	(United States) Maxwell McKennon (Portugal) Gonçalo Marques	(Greece) Pavlos Tsitsipas (Spain) Rafael Izquierdo Luque (Portugal) Francisco Rocha (Spain) Iker Urribarrens Ramírez
July 13	Uslar, Germany; Clay; M15; Singles and doubles draws	(Germany) Adrian Oetzbach; 6–4, 7–5	(Ukraine) Oleksii Krutykh	(Poland) Tomasz Berkieta (Germany) Vincent Marysko	(Germany) Nikolai Barsukov (Germany) Ruben Hartig (Germany) Yannic Nittmann (Germany) Lasse Poertner
July 13	Uslar, Germany; Clay; M15; Singles and doubles draws	(Netherlands) Kjell de Hek (Netherlands) Herman Knoop; 6–2, 6–4	(Germany) Arian Barbic (Germany) Lenn Stueckrath	(Poland) Tomasz Berkieta (Germany) Vincent Marysko	(Germany) Nikolai Barsukov (Germany) Ruben Hartig (Germany) Yannic Nittmann (Germany) Lasse Poertner
July 13	Gubbio, Italy; Clay; M15; Singles and doubles draws	(Italy) Pierluigi Basile; 6–4, 5–7, 6–2	(Italy) Daniele Rapagnetta	(France) Pierre Antoine Tailleu (Italy) Pietro Marino	(Italy) Lorenzo Beraldo (Italy) Stefano D'Agostino (Germany) Maximilian Homberg (Italy) Gabriele Maria Noce
July 13	Gubbio, Italy; Clay; M15; Singles and doubles draws	(Italy) Lorenzo Beraldo (Italy) Matteo Sciahbasi; 6–2, 6–4	(Italy) Alessandro Ingarao (Italy) Pietro Marino	(France) Pierre Antoine Tailleu (Italy) Pietro Marino	(Italy) Lorenzo Beraldo (Italy) Stefano D'Agostino (Germany) Maximilian Homberg (Italy) Gabriele Maria Noce
July 13	Nova Gorica, Slovenia; Clay; M15; Singles and doubles draws	(Greece) Dimitris Sakellaridis; 6–1, 6–1	(Italy) Luca Castagnola	(Italy) Lorenzo Bocchi (Italy) Gabriele Bosio	(Italy) Filiberto Fumagalli (Slovakia) Radovan Michalík (Slovakia) Tomáš Lánik (Cyprus) Melios Efstathiou
July 13	Nova Gorica, Slovenia; Clay; M15; Singles and doubles draws	(Czech Republic) Jan Hrazdil (Slovakia) Tomáš Lánik; 6–4, 6–4	(Italy) Daniel Amarandei (Italy) Lorenzo Balducci	(Italy) Lorenzo Bocchi (Italy) Gabriele Bosio	(Italy) Filiberto Fumagalli (Slovakia) Radovan Michalík (Slovakia) Tomáš Lánik (Cyprus) Melios Efstathiou
July 13	Slobozia, Romania; Clay; M15; Singles and doubles draws	(Romania) Radu David Țurcanu; 6–1, 6–1	(Ukraine) Oleksandr Ovcharenko	(Ukraine) Semen Aginskiy (Moldova) Ilya Snițari	Uladzimir Ignatik (Romania) Dragoș Nicolae Cazacu (Romania) Cezar Gabriel Papoe (Romania) Mihai Răzvan Marinescu
July 13	Slobozia, Romania; Clay; M15; Singles and doubles draws	(Romania) Matei Florin Breazu (Romania) Vlad Cristian Breazu; 6–3, 6–4	(Romania) Tudor Batin (Romania) Adrian Constantin	(Ukraine) Semen Aginskiy (Moldova) Ilya Snițari	Uladzimir Ignatik (Romania) Dragoș Nicolae Cazacu (Romania) Cezar Gabriel Papoe (Romania) Mihai Răzvan Marinescu
July 13	Kuršumlijska Banja, Serbia; Clay; M15; Singles and doubles draws	(Italy) Davide Tortora; 6–2, 6–3	(France) Pierre Delage	(Italy) Guglielmo Verdese (Netherlands) Elgin Khoeblal	(Italy) Sebastiano Cocola; Timofei Derepasko (Uzbekistan) Nikita Belozertsev (Bulgaria) Dinko Dinev
July 13	Kuršumlijska Banja, Serbia; Clay; M15; Singles and doubles draws	Timofei Derepasko (Spain) Pedro Vives Marcos; 6–3, 6–2	(Bulgaria) Dinko Dinev (Austria) Matthias Ujvary	(Italy) Guglielmo Verdese (Netherlands) Elgin Khoeblal	(Italy) Sebastiano Cocola; Timofei Derepasko (Uzbekistan) Nikita Belozertsev (Bulgaria) Dinko Dinev
July 13	Monastir, Tunisia; Hard; M15; Singles and doubles draws	(France) Nicolas Robert; 6–4, 6–3	(France) Charles Bertimon	(Algeria) Toufik Sahtali (United Kingdom) Roan Jones	(United States) Dominick Mosejczuk (Kazakhstan) Amir Omarkhanov (France) Paul Barbier Gazeu (Tunisia) Alaa Trifi
July 13	Monastir, Tunisia; Hard; M15; Singles and doubles draws	(United Kingdom) Rahul Dhokia (Australia) Lachlan Vickery; 6–1, 6–2	(Italy) Enrico Rosellini (Italy) Giulio Stella	(Algeria) Toufik Sahtali (United Kingdom) Roan Jones	(United States) Dominick Mosejczuk (Kazakhstan) Amir Omarkhanov (France) Paul Barbier Gazeu (Tunisia) Alaa Trifi
July 13	Rochester, United States; Clay; M15; Singles and doubles draws	(United States) Michael Antonius; 6–1, 3–6, 6–2	(United States) Tristan McCormick	(United States) Jerrid Gaines Jr. (United States) Ilyas Milad Fahim	(United States) Benjamin Willwerth (United States) Axel Nefve (United States) Dakotah Bobo (United States) Alexander Bernard
July 13	Rochester, United States; Clay; M15; Singles and doubles draws	(United States) Andrew Delgado (New Zealand) Reece Falck; 6–2, 6–3	(United States) Alexander Bernard (United States) Ilija Palavestra	(United States) Jerrid Gaines Jr. (United States) Ilyas Milad Fahim	(United States) Benjamin Willwerth (United States) Axel Nefve (United States) Dakotah Bobo (United States) Alexander Bernard
July 13	Villa Constitución, Argentina; Clay; M15; Singles and doubles draws	(Uruguay) Joaquín Aguilar Cardozo; 6–4, 6–0	(Argentina) Lorenzo Joaquín Rodríguez	(Argentina) Thiago Cigarrán (Argentina) Máximo Zeitune	(Bolivia) Murkel Dellien (Argentina) Fermín Tenti (Argentina) Carlos María Zárate (Argentina) Juan Estévez
July 13	Villa Constitución, Argentina; Clay; M15; Singles and doubles draws	(Bolivia) Murkel Dellien (Argentina) Lorenzo Joaquín Rodríguez; 7–6^{(7–1)}, 6–2	(Argentina) Segundo Goity Zapico (Argentina) Tadeo Meneo	(Argentina) Thiago Cigarrán (Argentina) Máximo Zeitune	(Bolivia) Murkel Dellien (Argentina) Fermín Tenti (Argentina) Carlos María Zárate (Argentina) Juan Estévez
July 20	Dénia, Spain; Clay; M25; Singles and doubles draws	Pavel Lagutin; 6–2, 7–6^{(7–5)}	(Spain) Pedro Ródenas	(Spain) Carlos López Montagud (Morocco) Reda Bennani	(Argentina) Hernán Casanova (Italy) Lorenzo Angelini (Spain) Oscar José Gutierrez (Spain) Javier Barranco Cosano
July 20	Dénia, Spain; Clay; M25; Singles and doubles draws	(Netherlands) Brian Bozemoj (Netherlands) Stijn Pel; 6–3, 3–6, [10–8]	(Argentina) Hernán Casanova (Ukraine) Eric Vanshelboim	(Spain) Carlos López Montagud (Morocco) Reda Bennani	(Argentina) Hernán Casanova (Italy) Lorenzo Angelini (Spain) Oscar José Gutierrez (Spain) Javier Barranco Cosano
July 20	Metzingen, Germany; Clay; M25; Singles and doubles draws	(France) Raphael Perot; 5–7, 6–4, 6–4	(Germany) Patrick Zahraj	(Germany) Yannik Kelm (Germany) Adrian Oetzbach	(Netherlands) Max Houkes (Switzerland) Johan Nikles (Norway) Viktor Durasovic (Czech Republic) Daniel Siniakov
July 20	Metzingen, Germany; Clay; M25; Singles and doubles draws	(Czech Republic) Dominik Reček (Czech Republic) Daniel Siniakov; 7–5, 3–6, [10–7]	(Poland) Tomasz Berkieta (Germany) Jamie Mackenzie	(Germany) Yannik Kelm (Germany) Adrian Oetzbach	(Netherlands) Max Houkes (Switzerland) Johan Nikles (Norway) Viktor Durasovic (Czech Republic) Daniel Siniakov
July 20	Ollersbach, Austria; Clay; M25; Singles and doubles draws	(Slovenia) Filip Jeff Planinšek; 2–6, 7–5, 6–3	(France) Mathys Erhard	(Italy) Tommaso Compagnucci (Slovakia) Andrej Martin	(Slovenia) Bor Artnak (Austria) Sebastian Sorger; Marat Sharipov (Czech Republic) Jan Kumstát
July 20	Ollersbach, Austria; Clay; M25; Singles and doubles draws	(Czech Republic) Jan Kumstát (Czech Republic) Štěpán Pecák; 7–5, 7–6^{(7–4)}	Marat Sharipov (Greece) Petros Tsitsipas	(Italy) Tommaso Compagnucci (Slovakia) Andrej Martin	(Slovenia) Bor Artnak (Austria) Sebastian Sorger; Marat Sharipov (Czech Republic) Jan Kumstát
July 20	Bacău, Romania; Clay; M25+H; Singles and doubles draws	(Romania) Radu Mihai Papoe; 6–0, 6–0	(Romania) Dragoș Nicolae Cazacu	(Romania) Robert Guna (Romania) Tudor Batin	(Romania) Ștefan Adrian Andreescu (France) Yannick Theodor Alexandrescou (Romania) Radu David Țurcanu (Romania) Matei Florin Breazu
July 20	Bacău, Romania; Clay; M25+H; Singles and doubles draws	(Ukraine) Oleksandr Ovcharenko (Italy) Riccardo Perin; 6–3, 2–6, [10–5]	(United States) Kabeer Kapasi (United States) Petro Kuzmenok	(Romania) Robert Guna (Romania) Tudor Batin	(Romania) Ștefan Adrian Andreescu (France) Yannick Theodor Alexandrescou (Romania) Radu David Țurcanu (Romania) Matei Florin Breazu
July 20	Champaign, United States; Hard; M25; Singles and doubles draws	(United States) Evan Bynoe; 6–2, 7–6^{(7–5)}	(Japan) Naoya Honda	(United Kingdom) William Jansen (United States) Mitchell Sheldon	(Morocco) Karim Bennani (United States) Nikita Samuel Filin (United States) William Mroz (United States) Eli Stephenson
July 20	Champaign, United States; Hard; M25; Singles and doubles draws	(United States) Tyler Bowers (United States) Nikita Samuel Filin; 4–6, 6–3, [10–7]	(United States) Vignesh Gogineni (United States) Billy Suarez	(United Kingdom) William Jansen (United States) Mitchell Sheldon	(Morocco) Karim Bennani (United States) Nikita Samuel Filin (United States) William Mroz (United States) Eli Stephenson
July 20	São Paulo, Brazil; Clay; M25; Singles and doubles draws	(Brazil) Felipe Meligeni Alves; 6–4, 6–3	(Brazil) Paulo André Saraiva dos Santos	(Brazil) Lucas Andrade da Silva (Argentina) Lorenzo Joaquín Rodríguez	(Chile) Matías Soto (Argentina) Juan Estévez (Argentina) Carlos María Zárate (Brazil) José Pereira
July 20	São Paulo, Brazil; Clay; M25; Singles and doubles draws	(Brazil) João Victor Couto Loureiro (Peru) Conner Huertas del Pino; 6–2, 6–0	(Brazil) Enzo Kohlmann de Freitas (Brazil) Nicolas Oliveira	(Brazil) Lucas Andrade da Silva (Argentina) Lorenzo Joaquín Rodríguez	(Chile) Matías Soto (Argentina) Juan Estévez (Argentina) Carlos María Zárate (Brazil) José Pereira
July 20	Brisbane, Australia; Hard; M15; Singles and doubles draws	(Australia) Jake Delaney; 7–5, 6–3	(Australia) Matthew Dellavedova	(Australia) Matt Hulme (Australia) Duje Markovina	(Australia) Daniel Jovanovski (Australia) Moerani Bouzige (Australia) Chase Ferguson (Australia) Taiki Takizawa
July 20	Brisbane, Australia; Hard; M15; Singles and doubles draws	(Japan) Kazuma Kawachi (Japan) Yuki Mochizuki; Walkover	(Australia) Matt Hulme (United Kingdom) Brandon Walkin	(Australia) Matt Hulme (Australia) Duje Markovina	(Australia) Daniel Jovanovski (Australia) Moerani Bouzige (Australia) Chase Ferguson (Australia) Taiki Takizawa
July 20	Bali, Indonesia; Hard; M15; Singles and doubles draws	(Thailand) Thanaphat Boosarawongse; 4–6, 6–3, 7–5	(Japan) Ryuki Matsuda	(United States) Alexander Chang (Japan) Ryotaro Taguchi	(South Korea) Shin San-hui (Australia) Sam Ryan Ziegann (Japan) Taisei Ichikawa (New Zealand) Isaac Becroft
July 20	Bali, Indonesia; Hard; M15; Singles and doubles draws	(United States) Alexander Chang (Thailand) Tanapatt Nirundorn; 6–3, 7–5	(Japan) Taisei Ichikawa (Japan) Hikaru Shiraishi	(United States) Alexander Chang (Japan) Ryotaro Taguchi	(South Korea) Shin San-hui (Australia) Sam Ryan Ziegann (Japan) Taisei Ichikawa (New Zealand) Isaac Becroft
July 20	Rognac, France; Hard; M15; Singles and doubles draws	(Argentina) Julio César Porras; 7–5, 7–6^{(7–4)}	(France) Clément Lemire	(France) Hugo Car (France) Alexandre Reco	(United Kingdom) Lui Maxted (France) Lucas Marionneau (France) Loan Lestir (France) Mathieu Scaglia
July 20	Rognac, France; Hard; M15; Singles and doubles draws	(France) Mikail Alimli (France) Antoine Walch; 4–6, 6–3, [10–4]	(Spain) Valentín González-Galiño (Argentina) Julio César Porras	(France) Hugo Car (France) Alexandre Reco	(United Kingdom) Lui Maxted (France) Lucas Marionneau (France) Loan Lestir (France) Mathieu Scaglia
July 20	Segrate, Italy; Clay; M15; Singles and doubles draws	(Italy) Juan Cruz Martin Manzano; 6–3, 6–4	(Switzerland) Nicolás Parizzia	(Belgium) Martin van der Meerschen (France) Yanis Ghazouani Durand	(Italy) Raffaele Ciurnelli (Italy) Michele Mecarelli (Italy) Gabriele Bosio (Bulgaria) Adrian Andreev
July 20	Segrate, Italy; Clay; M15; Singles and doubles draws	(Italy) Marco Furlanetto (Switzerland) Nicolás Parizzia; 7–6^{(7–5)}, 6–3	(Italy) Matteo Gribaldo (Italy) Simone Massellani	(Belgium) Martin van der Meerschen (France) Yanis Ghazouani Durand	(Italy) Raffaele Ciurnelli (Italy) Michele Mecarelli (Italy) Gabriele Bosio (Bulgaria) Adrian Andreev
July 20	Kuršumlijska Banja, Serbia; Clay; M15; Singles and doubles draws	(Spain) Pedro Vives Marcos; 6–4, 6–2	(Serbia) Branko Đurić	(Netherlands) Elgin Khoeblal (Italy) Lorenzo Comino	(Serbia) Dušan Obradović (Uzbekistan) Nikita Belozertsev (Bulgaria) Yanaki Milev (Serbia) Kristijan Juhas
July 20	Kuršumlijska Banja, Serbia; Clay; M15; Singles and doubles draws	(North Macedonia) Obrad Markovski (Serbia) Marko Milosavljević; 7–5, 6–2	(Uzbekistan) Nikita Belozertsev; Ivan Gretskiy	(Netherlands) Elgin Khoeblal (Italy) Lorenzo Comino	(Serbia) Dušan Obradović (Uzbekistan) Nikita Belozertsev (Bulgaria) Yanaki Milev (Serbia) Kristijan Juhas
July 20	Huamantla, Mexico; Hard; M15; Singles and doubles draws	(United States) Matthew Thomson; 6–7^{(2–7)}, 6–2, 6–4	(Canada) Alvin Nicholas Tudorica	(United States) Preston Brown (United States) Mwendwa Mbithi	(Czech Republic) Oliver Sanders (Nicaragua) Joaquín Guilleme (United States) Keshav Chopra (Mexico) Emiliano Aguilera Guerrero
July 20	Huamantla, Mexico; Hard; M15; Singles and doubles draws	(Mexico) Eugenio González Fitzmaurice (United States) Elijah Strode; 6–3, 6–2	(Canada) Volodymyr Gurenko (Colombia) Andrés Urrea	(United States) Preston Brown (United States) Mwendwa Mbithi	(Czech Republic) Oliver Sanders (Nicaragua) Joaquín Guilleme (United States) Keshav Chopra (Mexico) Emiliano Aguilera Guerrero
July 27	Aldershot, United Kingdom; Hard; M25; Singles and doubles draws	(United Kingdom) Oliver Tarvet; 6–1, 6–3	(United Kingdom) Emile Hudd	(United Kingdom) Billy Blaydes (United States) Ronald Hohmann	(Portugal) Tiago Cação (United Kingdom) Patrick Brady (United Kingdom) Hugo Coquelin (United Kingdom) Rahul Dhokia
July 27	Aldershot, United Kingdom; Hard; M25; Singles and doubles draws	(United Kingdom) Tom Hands (United Kingdom) Matthew Summers; 6–1, 6–4	(Slovenia) Sebastian Dominko (United States) Nicholas Godsick	(United Kingdom) Billy Blaydes (United States) Ronald Hohmann	(Portugal) Tiago Cação (United Kingdom) Patrick Brady (United Kingdom) Hugo Coquelin (United Kingdom) Rahul Dhokia
July 27	Wetzlar, Germany; Clay; M25; Singles and doubles draws	(France) Geoffrey Blancaneaux; 6–1, 6–2	(Germany) Filip Krolo	(Belgium) Jack Logé (Germany) Tom Sickenberger	(Bolivia) Murkel Dellien (Germany) Vincent Marysko (Germany) Yannik Kelm (Germany) Nikolai Barsukov
July 27	Wetzlar, Germany; Clay; M25; Singles and doubles draws	(Bolivia) Murkel Dellien (Argentina) Tomás Farjat; 6–2, 6–4	(Germany) Edison Ambarzumjan (India) Madhwin Kamath	(Belgium) Jack Logé (Germany) Tom Sickenberger	(Bolivia) Murkel Dellien (Germany) Vincent Marysko (Germany) Yannik Kelm (Germany) Nikolai Barsukov
July 27	Bolzano, Italy; Clay; M25; Singles and doubles draws	(Austria) Sebastian Sorger; 7–6^{(8–6)}, 6–3	(Austria) Sandro Kopp	(Bulgaria) Adrian Andreev (Italy) Alexander Weis	(Italy) Federico Arnaboldi (Italy) Gabriele Crivellaro (Norway) Viktor Durasovic (Ukraine) Vladyslav Orlov
July 27	Bolzano, Italy; Clay; M25; Singles and doubles draws	(Italy) Alessio De Bernardis (Italy) Denis Spiridon; 6–3, 7–6^{(7–5)}	(Italy) Stefano D'Agostino (Italy) Manuel Plunger	(Bulgaria) Adrian Andreev (Italy) Alexander Weis	(Italy) Federico Arnaboldi (Italy) Gabriele Crivellaro (Norway) Viktor Durasovic (Ukraine) Vladyslav Orlov
July 27	Gentofte, Denmark; Clay; M25; Singles and doubles draws	(Bulgaria) Petr Nesterov; 3–6, 6–3, 6–1	(Denmark) Carl Emil Overbeck	(Bulgaria) Ivan Ivanov (Finland) Eero Vasa	(Sweden) Jonas Eriksson Ziverts (Sweden) Patrik Munkhammar (Greece) Aristotelis Thanos (Sweden) Karl Friberg
July 27	Gentofte, Denmark; Clay; M25; Singles and doubles draws	(Denmark) Carl Emil Overbeck (Denmark) Oskar Brostrøm Poulsen; 7–5, 6–2	(Denmark) Valdemar Frederik Pape (Denmark) Gustav Theilgaard	(Bulgaria) Ivan Ivanov (Finland) Eero Vasa	(Sweden) Jonas Eriksson Ziverts (Sweden) Patrik Munkhammar (Greece) Aristotelis Thanos (Sweden) Karl Friberg
July 27	Koszalin, Poland; Clay; M25; Singles and doubles draws	(Portugal) Tiago Pereira; 6–1, 7–5	(North Macedonia) Oleg Prihodko	(Poland) Daniel Michalski (Germany) Niklas Guttau	(Poland) Marcel Zieliński (Spain) Imanol López Morillo (Poland) Alan Ważny (Germany) Tom Zeuch
July 27	Koszalin, Poland; Clay; M25; Singles and doubles draws	(Poland) Oskar Grzegorzewski (Portugal) Tiago Pereira; 6–4, 6–3	(Czech Republic) Jan Hrazdil (Czech Republic) Štěpán Pecák	(Poland) Daniel Michalski (Germany) Niklas Guttau	(Poland) Marcel Zieliński (Spain) Imanol López Morillo (Poland) Alan Ważny (Germany) Tom Zeuch
July 27	Pitești, Romania; Clay; M25; Singles and doubles draws	(Romania) Radu Mihai Papoe; 6–3, 6–2	(Romania) Ștefan Adrian Andreescu	(Italy) Francesco Ferrari (Slovenia) Bor Artnak	(Romania) Ștefan Horia Haita (Romania) Gabriel Ghețu (France) Yannick Theodor Alexandrescou (Romania) Cezar Gabriel Papoe
July 27	Pitești, Romania; Clay; M25; Singles and doubles draws	(Romania) Ștefan Horia Haita (Romania) Radu David Țurcanu; 2–6, 6–2, [10–5]	(Ukraine) Oleksandr Ovcharenko (Italy) Riccardo Perin	(Italy) Francesco Ferrari (Slovenia) Bor Artnak	(Romania) Ștefan Horia Haita (Romania) Gabriel Ghețu (France) Yannick Theodor Alexandrescou (Romania) Cezar Gabriel Papoe
July 27	Edwardsville, United States; Hard; M25; Singles and doubles draws	(United States) Vignesh Gogineni; 6–4, 6–2	(United States) Ozan Baris	(United Kingdom) Johannus Monday (United States) Bruno Kuzuhara	(Norway) Andreja Petrovic (United States) Maxwell Exsted (United States) Jack Anthrop (Morocco) Karim Bennani
July 27	Edwardsville, United States; Hard; M25; Singles and doubles draws	(United States) Maxwell Exsted (United States) Cooper Woestendick; 6–1, 6–1	(United States) Jack Anthrop (United States) Noah Zamora	(United Kingdom) Johannus Monday (United States) Bruno Kuzuhara	(Norway) Andreja Petrovic (United States) Maxwell Exsted (United States) Jack Anthrop (Morocco) Karim Bennani
July 27	Brisbane, Australia; Hard; M15; Singles and doubles draws	(Australia) Omar Jasika; 7–6^{(9–7)}, 6–3	(Australia) Moerani Bouzige	(Australia) Matthew Dellavedova (Australia) Jake Delaney	(Australia) Mustafa Ege Şık (Australia) Ymerali Ibraimi (Japan) Shinji Hazawa (Australia) Scott Jones
July 27	Brisbane, Australia; Hard; M15; Singles and doubles draws	(Australia) Joshua Charlton (Australia) Scott Jones; 6–2, 6–4	(Australia) Casey Hoole (Australia) Derek Pham	(Australia) Matthew Dellavedova (Australia) Jake Delaney	(Australia) Mustafa Ege Şık (Australia) Ymerali Ibraimi (Japan) Shinji Hazawa (Australia) Scott Jones
July 27	Bali, Indonesia; Hard; M15; Singles and doubles draws	(New Zealand) Isaac Becroft; 7–6^{(7–4)}, 6–7^{(4–7)}, 6–1	(Australia) Sam Ryan Ziegann	(Japan) Keisuke Saitoh (Japan) Asahi Harazaki	(South Korea) Shin San-hui (Thailand) Tanapatt Nirundorn (Japan) Ryuki Matsuda (Japan) Yusuke Takahashi
July 27	Bali, Indonesia; Hard; M15; Singles and doubles draws	(Japan) Taisei Ichikawa (Japan) Hikaru Shiraishi; 6–1, 7–6^{(7–5)}	(New Zealand) Isaac Becroft (Japan) Daisuke Sumizawa	(Japan) Keisuke Saitoh (Japan) Asahi Harazaki	(South Korea) Shin San-hui (Thailand) Tanapatt Nirundorn (Japan) Ryuki Matsuda (Japan) Yusuke Takahashi
July 27	Astana, Kazakhstan; Hard; M15; Singles and doubles draws	Petr Bar Biryukov; 3–6, 6–2, 6–4	Grigory Shebekin	(Kazakhstan) Damir Zhalgasbay (Kazakhstan) Zangar Nurlanuly	(Japan) Shunsuke Mitsui (Kazakhstan) Amir Omarkhanov (Israel) Dan Brand (Japan) Sora Fukuda
July 27	Astana, Kazakhstan; Hard; M15; Singles and doubles draws	(Japan) Sora Fukuda (Japan) Shunsuke Mitsui; 6–2, 6–3	(Kazakhstan) Danial Rakhmatullayev (Kazakhstan) Damir Zhalgasbay	(Kazakhstan) Damir Zhalgasbay (Kazakhstan) Zangar Nurlanuly	(Japan) Shunsuke Mitsui (Kazakhstan) Amir Omarkhanov (Israel) Dan Brand (Japan) Sora Fukuda
July 27	Dublin, Ireland; Carpet; M15; Singles and doubles draws	(Republic of Ireland) Conor Gannon; 7–6^{(7–5)}, 6–7^{(3–7)}, 6–4	(Estonia) Markus Mölder	(France) Robin Catry (Netherlands) Daniel de Jonge	(France) Lucas Marionneau (Republic of Ireland) Michael Agwi (France) Matt Ponchet (United Kingdom) Roan Jones
July 27	Dublin, Ireland; Carpet; M15; Singles and doubles draws	(Spain) Pablo Perez Ramos (Republic of Ireland) Michael Wright; 6–1, 7–5	(Republic of Ireland) Michael Agwi (United Kingdom) Felix Mischker	(France) Robin Catry (Netherlands) Daniel de Jonge	(France) Lucas Marionneau (Republic of Ireland) Michael Agwi (France) Matt Ponchet (United Kingdom) Roan Jones
July 27	Xàtiva, Spain; Clay; M15; Singles and doubles draws	Pavel Lagutin; 6–2, 7–5	(Spain) Carlos López Montagud	(Ukraine) Eric Vanshelboim (Spain) Carles Hernández	(Norway) Herman Hoeyeraal (Venezuela) Ignacio Parisca Romera (Spain) Miguel Angel Machado (Spain) Pedro Ródenas
July 27	Xàtiva, Spain; Clay; M15; Singles and doubles draws	(Hungary) Mátyás Füle (Norway) Herman Hoeyeraal; 6–4, 6–2	(Netherlands) Brian Bozemoj (Netherlands) Stijn Pel	(Ukraine) Eric Vanshelboim (Spain) Carles Hernández	(Norway) Herman Hoeyeraal (Venezuela) Ignacio Parisca Romera (Spain) Miguel Angel Machado (Spain) Pedro Ródenas
July 27	Strasbourg, France; Clay; M15; Singles and doubles draws	(France) Pierre Delage; 6–4, 6–1	(France) Théo Papamalamis	(France) Arthur Nagel (France) Maxime Chazal	(France) Tristan Berard (France) Amaury Raynel (France) Maxence Bertimon (Belgium) Nicolas Ifi
July 27	Strasbourg, France; Clay; M15; Singles and doubles draws	(France) Axel Garcian (France) Arthur Nagel; 7–6^{(7–1)}, 4–6, [10–8]	(France) Adan Freire da Silva (Belgium) Nicolas Ifi	(France) Arthur Nagel (France) Maxime Chazal	(France) Tristan Berard (France) Amaury Raynel (France) Maxence Bertimon (Belgium) Nicolas Ifi
July 27	Wels, Austria; Clay; M15; Singles and doubles draws	(Slovenia) Žiga Šeško; 7–6^{(7–4)}, 6–4	(Germany) Erik Schiessl	(Germany) Marlon Vankan (Sweden) John Hallquist Lithen	(Switzerland) Facundo Yunis (Hungary) Adam Jilly (Austria) Matthias Ujvary (Finland) Iiro Vasa
July 27	Wels, Austria; Clay; M15; Singles and doubles draws	(Germany) David Eichenseher (Germany) Erik Schiessl; 6–4, 6–4	(Hungary) David Bakonyi (Hungary) Adam Jilly	(Germany) Marlon Vankan (Sweden) John Hallquist Lithen	(Switzerland) Facundo Yunis (Hungary) Adam Jilly (Austria) Matthias Ujvary (Finland) Iiro Vasa
July 27	Kuršumlijska Banja, Serbia; Clay; M15; Singles and doubles draws	(Italy) Andrea de Marchi; 6–4, 6–3	(Serbia) Veljko Krstić	(Italy) Gabriele Maria Noce (Serbia) Niksa Arsić	(Serbia) Vlado Jankanj (Italy) Alessandro Bellifemine (Italy) Lorenzo Comino (Serbia) Marko Maksimović
July 27	Kuršumlijska Banja, Serbia; Clay; M15; Singles and doubles draws	(Italy) Leonardo Cattaneo (Italy) Lorenzo Comino; 6–3, 7–6^{(7–3)}	(Japan) Makoto Ochi (Latvia) Artūrs Žagars	(Italy) Gabriele Maria Noce (Serbia) Niksa Arsić	(Serbia) Vlado Jankanj (Italy) Alessandro Bellifemine (Italy) Lorenzo Comino (Serbia) Marko Maksimović
July 27	Huamantla, Mexico; Hard; M15; Singles and doubles draws	(Canada) Alvin Nicholas Tudorica; 6–2, 6–4	(United States) Elijah Strode	(United States) Matthew Thomson (Canada) Niels Peter van Noord	(India) Aditya Balsekar (United States) Matt Kuhar (United States) Keshav Chopra (Peru) Mauricio Echazú
July 27	Huamantla, Mexico; Hard; M15; Singles and doubles draws	(Canada) Volodymyr Gurenko (Canada) Niels Peter van Noord; 6–4, 6–4	(Mexico) Eugenio González Fitzmaurice (United States) Elijah Strode	(United States) Matthew Thomson (Canada) Niels Peter van Noord	(India) Aditya Balsekar (United States) Matt Kuhar (United States) Keshav Chopra (Peru) Mauricio Echazú
July 27	São Paulo, Brazil; Clay; M15; Singles and doubles draws	(Brazil) Mateus Alves; 6–3, 7–5	(Brazil) Gustavo Ribeiro de Almeida	(Chile) Bastián Malla (Brazil) Wilson Leite	(Brazil) Enzo Lima (Brazil) Nicolas Zanellato (Chile) Benjamín Torrealba (Brazil) Paulo André Saraiva dos Santos
July 27	São Paulo, Brazil; Clay; M15; Singles and doubles draws	(Paraguay) Martín Antonio Vergara del Puerto (Argentina) Máximo Zeitune; 6–3, 5–7, [10–8]	(Brazil) Rafael Tosetto (Brazil) Nicolas Zanellato	(Chile) Bastián Malla (Brazil) Wilson Leite	(Brazil) Enzo Lima (Brazil) Nicolas Zanellato (Chile) Benjamín Torrealba (Brazil) Paulo André Saraiva dos Santos

=== August ===
Week of	Tournament	Winner	Runners-up	Semifinalists	Quarterfinalists
August 3	Roehampton, United Kingdom; Hard; M25; Singles and doubles draws	(United Kingdom) Charles Broom; 6–3, 6–2	(United Kingdom) Oliver Tarvet	(United Kingdom) Lui Maxted (United Kingdom) Anton Matusevich	(United Kingdom) Oscar Brown (United Kingdom) Mark Ceban (United States) Alex Rybakov (United Kingdom) Emile Hudd
August 3	Roehampton, United Kingdom; Hard; M25; Singles and doubles draws	(Slovenia) Sebastian Dominko (United States) Nicholas Godsick; 6–3, 6–4	(Australia) Stefan Vujic (United Kingdom) Marcus Walters	(United Kingdom) Lui Maxted (United Kingdom) Anton Matusevich	(United Kingdom) Oscar Brown (United Kingdom) Mark Ceban (United States) Alex Rybakov (United Kingdom) Emile Hudd
August 3	Tauste, Spain; Hard; M25+H; Singles and doubles draws	(Spain) Alejo Sánchez Quílez; 6–4, 6–4	(Spain) Izan Almazán Valiente	(France) Benjamin Pietri (India) Aryan Shah	(Spain) Sergio Callejón Hernando (Greece) Pavlos Tsitsipas (Spain) Mario González Fernández (Italy) Andrea Colombo
August 3	Tauste, Spain; Hard; M25+H; Singles and doubles draws	(Italy) Andrea Colombo (Spain) Rafael Izquierdo Luque; 6–1, 3–6, [10–6]	(United States) Jeffrey Fradkin (United States) Tristan McCormick	(France) Benjamin Pietri (India) Aryan Shah	(Spain) Sergio Callejón Hernando (Greece) Pavlos Tsitsipas (Spain) Mario González Fernández (Italy) Andrea Colombo
August 3	Fano, Italy; Clay; M25; Singles and doubles draws	(Denmark) Carl Emil Overbeck; 7–6^{(7–5)}, 7–6^{(9–7)}	(Italy) Marcello Serafini	(Italy) Leonardo Primucci (Italy) Massimo Giunta	(Italy) Stefano D'Agostino (Italy) Niccolò Catini (Italy) Gabriele Crivellaro (Italy) Giorgio Tabacco
August 3	Fano, Italy; Clay; M25; Singles and doubles draws	(Italy) Alessandro Spadola (Finland) Iiro Vasa; 6–3, 7–5	(Italy) Daniel Amarandei (Italy) Lorenzo Berto	(Italy) Leonardo Primucci (Italy) Massimo Giunta	(Italy) Stefano D'Agostino (Italy) Niccolò Catini (Italy) Gabriele Crivellaro (Italy) Giorgio Tabacco
August 3	Kuršumlijska Banja, Serbia; Clay; M25; Singles and doubles draws	(Morocco) Walid Ahouda; 4–6, 6–3, 6–3	(Slovenia) Bor Artnak	(Iran) Ali Yazdani (Italy) Lorenzo Comino	(Serbia) Aleksa Pisarić; Ruslan Tiukaev (Serbia) Dušan Obradović (Serbia) Veljko Krstić
August 3	Kuršumlijska Banja, Serbia; Clay; M25; Singles and doubles draws	(Serbia) Aleksa Pisarić (Serbia) Vuk Radjenovic; 6–4, 6–7^{(3–7)}, [10–8]	(Greece) Nikolaos Chatziavraam (Greece) Ioannis Kountourakis	(Iran) Ali Yazdani (Italy) Lorenzo Comino	(Serbia) Aleksa Pisarić; Ruslan Tiukaev (Serbia) Dušan Obradović (Serbia) Veljko Krstić
August 3	Southaven, United States; Hard; M25; Singles and doubles draws	(France) Timo Legout; 6–2, 6–4	(United States) Evan Zhu	(France) Clément Chidekh (United States) Maximus Dussault	(Australia) Cruz Hewitt (United States) Jack Anthrop (United States) Kaylan Bigun (United States) Patrick Maloney
August 3	Southaven, United States; Hard; M25; Singles and doubles draws	(United States) Kelly Giese (United States) Sam Landau; 1–6, 6–3, [10–8]	(United States) Maxwell Exsted (United States) Cooper Woestendick	(France) Clément Chidekh (United States) Maximus Dussault	(Australia) Cruz Hewitt (United States) Jack Anthrop (United States) Kaylan Bigun (United States) Patrick Maloney
August 3	Londrina, Brazil; Clay; M25; Singles and doubles draws	(Brazil) Felipe Meligeni Alves; 6–3, 7–5	(Brazil) Paulo André Saraiva dos Santos	(Argentina) Máximo Zeitune (Argentina) Carlos Maria Zárate	(Colombia) Juan Sebastián Osorio (Brazil) João Eduardo Schiessl (Colombia) Salvador Price (Brazil) Gustavo Ribeiro de Almeida
August 3	Londrina, Brazil; Clay; M25; Singles and doubles draws	(Brazil) Victor Pagotto (Brazil) João Eduardo Schiessl; 6–4, 6–2	(Brazil) Wilson Leite (Brazil) Paulo André Saraiva dos Santos	(Argentina) Máximo Zeitune (Argentina) Carlos Maria Zárate	(Colombia) Juan Sebastián Osorio (Brazil) João Eduardo Schiessl (Colombia) Salvador Price (Brazil) Gustavo Ribeiro de Almeida
August 3	Tianjin, China; Hard; M15; Singles and doubles draws	(Australia) Matthew Dellavedova; 6–3, 3–6, 6–0	(Japan) Yuki Mochizuki	(New Zealand) Isaac Becroft (South Korea) Hwang Dong-hyun	(South Korea) Ann Suk (China) Lu Hanlei (Chinese Taipei) Huang Tsung-hao (South Korea) Han Seon-yong
August 3	Tianjin, China; Hard; M15; Singles and doubles draws	(Chinese Taipei) Lai Chin-kuan (Armenia) Daniil Sarksian; 7–6^{(7–4)}, 3–6, [10–6]	(South Korea) Chung Yun-seong (South Korea) Han Seon-yong	(New Zealand) Isaac Becroft (South Korea) Hwang Dong-hyun	(South Korea) Ann Suk (China) Lu Hanlei (Chinese Taipei) Huang Tsung-hao (South Korea) Han Seon-yong
August 3	Astana, Kazakhstan; Hard; M15; Singles and doubles draws	(Japan) Shunsuke Mitsui; 7–5, 6–2	(Kazakhstan) Damir Zhalgasbay	Egor Pleshivtsev (India) Mukund Sasikumar	(India) Arnav Paparkar (Japan) Shintaro Imai (India) Maan Kesharwani (Thailand) Pawit Sornlaksup
August 3	Astana, Kazakhstan; Hard; M15; Singles and doubles draws	Martin Borisiouk (India) Karan Singh; 6–3, 6–2	(Kazakhstan) Danial Rakhmatullayev (Kazakhstan) Damir Zhalgasbay	Egor Pleshivtsev (India) Mukund Sasikumar	(India) Arnav Paparkar (Japan) Shintaro Imai (India) Maan Kesharwani (Thailand) Pawit Sornlaksup
August 3	Eupen, Belgium; Clay; M15; Singles and doubles draws	(Belgium) Martin van der Meerschen; 4–6, 6–4, 7–6^{(7–2)}	(France) Théo Papamalamis	(Netherlands) Abel Forger (Belgium) Benoit Torcq	(France) Arthur Nagel (Germany) Noah Schlagenhauf (Belgium) Alessio Basile (Belgium) Nicolas Ifi
August 3	Eupen, Belgium; Clay; M15; Singles and doubles draws	(Netherlands) Abel Forger (Netherlands) Elgin Khoeblal; 7–6^{(9–7)}, 6–7^{(6–8)}, [10–8]	(Netherlands) Wilco Geenen (Netherlands) Deney Wassermann	(Netherlands) Abel Forger (Belgium) Benoit Torcq	(France) Arthur Nagel (Germany) Noah Schlagenhauf (Belgium) Alessio Basile (Belgium) Nicolas Ifi
August 3	Frankfurt, Germany; Clay; M15; Singles and doubles draws	(France) Maxime Chazal; 6–2, 6–0	(Germany) Vincent Dullinger	(Germany) David Fix (Germany) Julien Penzlin	(Slovenia) Žiga Šeško (Germany) Aaron Funk (Germany) Arian Barbic; Kirill Kivattsev
August 3	Frankfurt, Germany; Clay; M15; Singles and doubles draws	(Argentina) Giovanni Branchetti (Bosnia and Herzegovina) Justin Ilić; 6–3, 6–3	(Germany) Henri Haupt (Germany) Jannik Maute	(Germany) David Fix (Germany) Julien Penzlin	(Slovenia) Žiga Šeško (Germany) Aaron Funk (Germany) Arian Barbic; Kirill Kivattsev
August 3	Bielsko-Biała, Poland; Clay; M15; Singles and doubles draws	(Poland) Marcel Zieliński; 3–6, 6–3, 7–6^{(7–3)}	(Colombia) Daniel Salazar	(Ukraine) Vladyslav Orlov (South Africa) Alec Beckley	(Poland) Wojciech Marek (United States) Michael Savano (Finland) Linus Lagerbohm (Austria) Gregor Hausberger
August 3	Bielsko-Biała, Poland; Clay; M15; Singles and doubles draws	(Italy) Matteo Fondriest (Bulgaria) Nikola Keremedchiev; 4–6, 6–1, [10–4]	(South Africa) Alec Beckley (Poland) Milosz Szczypka	(Ukraine) Vladyslav Orlov (South Africa) Alec Beckley	(Poland) Wojciech Marek (United States) Michael Savano (Finland) Linus Lagerbohm (Austria) Gregor Hausberger
August 3	Poprad, Slovakia; Clay; M15; Singles and doubles draws	(Hungary) Péter Makk; 6–3, 6–3	(Austria) Matthias Ujvary	(Sweden) John Hallquist Lithen (Poland) Karol Filar	(Austria) Nico Hipfl (United States) Sebastian Sec (Italy) Massimo Pizzigoni (Norway) Leyton Rivera
August 3	Poprad, Slovakia; Clay; M15; Singles and doubles draws	(Slovakia) Tomáš Lánik (Slovakia) Michal Novanský; 7–6^{(7–4)}, 6–3	(Hungary) David Bakonyi (Hungary) Botond Kisantal	(Sweden) John Hallquist Lithen (Poland) Karol Filar	(Austria) Nico Hipfl (United States) Sebastian Sec (Italy) Massimo Pizzigoni (Norway) Leyton Rivera
August 3	Curtea de Argeș, Romania; Clay; M15; Singles and doubles draws	(Romania) Rareș Teodor Pieleanu; 6–2, 6–1	(Italy) Giannicola Misasi	(Romania) Ștefan Adrian Andreescu (Romania) Gabriel Ghețu	(Romania) Robert Guna (Argentina) Fermín Tenti (France) Nicolas Robert (Italy) Filiberto Fumagalli
August 3	Curtea de Argeș, Romania; Clay; M15; Singles and doubles draws	(Italy) Filippo Francesco Garbero (Italy) Matteo Sciahbasi; 4–6, 6–1, [10–8]	(Italy) Gabriele Bosio (Argentina) Fermín Tenti	(Romania) Ștefan Adrian Andreescu (Romania) Gabriel Ghețu	(Romania) Robert Guna (Argentina) Fermín Tenti (France) Nicolas Robert (Italy) Filiberto Fumagalli
August 10	Idanha-a-Nova, Portugal; Hard; M25; Singles and doubles draws	(South Africa) Philip Henning; 6–4, 6–3	(France) Dan Added	(Portugal) Gonçalo Marques (United States) Tristan McCormick	(Spain) Pablo Perez Navarro (France) Robin Bertrand (Portugal) Tiago Pereira; Pavel Lagutin
August 10	Idanha-a-Nova, Portugal; Hard; M25; Singles and doubles draws	(South Africa) Philip Henning (Zimbabwe) Courtney John Lock; 6–3, 6–2	(Spain) Alberto Barroso Campos (France) Mathieu Scaglia	(Portugal) Gonçalo Marques (United States) Tristan McCormick	(Spain) Pablo Perez Navarro (France) Robin Bertrand (Portugal) Tiago Pereira; Pavel Lagutin
August 10	Koksijde, Belgium; Clay; M25; Singles and doubles draws	(France) Raphael Perot; 6–1, 6–1	(Belgium) Lars Goran Verwerft	(Belgium) Gilles-Arnaud Bailly (Belgium) Michael Geerts	(Lebanon) Fadi Bidan (Belgium) Jack Logé (France) Mickael Kaouk (France) Geoffrey Blancaneaux
August 10	Koksijde, Belgium; Clay; M25; Singles and doubles draws	(Netherlands) Abel Forger (Netherlands) Elgin Khoeblal; 2–6, 6–2, [11–9]	(Netherlands) Mats Hermans (Netherlands) Rik Muller	(Belgium) Gilles-Arnaud Bailly (Belgium) Michael Geerts	(Lebanon) Fadi Bidan (Belgium) Jack Logé (France) Mickael Kaouk (France) Geoffrey Blancaneaux
August 10	Muttenz, Switzerland; Clay; M25; Singles and doubles draws	(Switzerland) Luca Staeheli; 6–4, 5–7, 7–5	(Germany) Louis Wessels	(Switzerland) Jeffrey von der Schulenburg (Czech Republic) Matthew William Donald	(Austria) Nico Hipfl (Switzerland) Andrin Casanova (Greece) Dimitris Sakellaridis (Germany) Kai Wehnelt
August 10	Muttenz, Switzerland; Clay; M25; Singles and doubles draws	(Switzerland) Andrin Casanova (Switzerland) Nicolás Parizzia; 6–4, 6–7^{(2–7)}, [10–6]	(Austria) Nico Hipfl (Germany) Calvin Müller	(Switzerland) Jeffrey von der Schulenburg (Czech Republic) Matthew William Donald	(Austria) Nico Hipfl (Switzerland) Andrin Casanova (Greece) Dimitris Sakellaridis (Germany) Kai Wehnelt
August 10	Kuršumlijska Banja, Serbia; Clay; M25; Singles and doubles draws	(France) Sean Cuenin; 2–6, 7–6^{(7–2)}, 7–6^{(8–6)}	(Romania) Ștefan Horia Haita	Marat Sharipov; Andrey Chepelev	(Serbia) Dušan Obradović (Bulgaria) Alexander Vasilev (Slovenia) Bor Artnak (Serbia) Vuk Radjenovic
August 10	Kuršumlijska Banja, Serbia; Clay; M25; Singles and doubles draws	(Serbia) Kristijan Juhas (Serbia) Stefan Popović; 7–6^{(7–5)}, 6–1	(Serbia) Vlado Jankanj (Serbia) Vuk Radjenovic	Marat Sharipov; Andrey Chepelev	(Serbia) Dušan Obradović (Bulgaria) Alexander Vasilev (Slovenia) Bor Artnak (Serbia) Vuk Radjenovic
August 10	East Lansing, United States; Hard; M25; Singles and doubles draws	(United States) Karl Poling; 5–7, 7–6^{(8–6)}, 6–4	(Mexico) Luis Carlos Álvarez Valdés	(United States) Max Sheldon (United States) Nikita Samuel Filin	(United States) Tyler Bowers (United Kingdom) Alexander Okonkwo (United States) Ozan Baris (United States) Axel Nefve
August 10	East Lansing, United States; Hard; M25; Singles and doubles draws	(Mexico) Luis Carlos Álvarez Valdés (Mexico) Alan Magadán; 4–6, 6–4, [11–9]	(United Kingdom) Alexander Okonkwo (United Kingdom) Oliver Okonkwo	(United States) Max Sheldon (United States) Nikita Samuel Filin	(United States) Tyler Bowers (United Kingdom) Alexander Okonkwo (United States) Ozan Baris (United States) Axel Nefve
August 10	Tianjin, China; Hard; M15; Singles and doubles draws	(Australia) Omar Jasika; 7–6^{(7–3)}, 6–2	(Japan) Kosuke Ogura	(Australia) Matthew Dellavedova (South Korea) Chung Yun-seong	(Japan) Shinji Hazawa (South Korea) Lee Duck-hee (China) Meng Fanming (United States) Miles Jones
August 10	Tianjin, China; Hard; M15; Singles and doubles draws	(South Korea) Chung Yun-seong (Chinese Taipei) Hsieh Cheng-peng; 6–4, 6–4	(Australia) Omar Jasika (South Korea) Lee Duck-hee	(Australia) Matthew Dellavedova (South Korea) Chung Yun-seong	(Japan) Shinji Hazawa (South Korea) Lee Duck-hee (China) Meng Fanming (United States) Miles Jones
August 10	Trier, Germany; Clay; M15; Singles and doubles draws	(Republic of Ireland) Michael Agwi; 6–2, 6–1	(Slovenia) Žiga Šeško	(Germany) Liam Gavrielides (Poland) Marcel Zieliński	(Germany) Niklas Schell (Germany) Adrian Oetzbach (Germany) Oliver Majdandžić (Germany) Marlon Vankan
August 10	Trier, Germany; Clay; M15; Singles and doubles draws	(Germany) John Sperle (Germany) Marlon Vankan; 6–3, 6–7^{(2–7)}, [10–4]	(Germany) Adrian Oetzbach (Germany) Niklas Schell	(Germany) Liam Gavrielides (Poland) Marcel Zieliński	(Germany) Niklas Schell (Germany) Adrian Oetzbach (Germany) Oliver Majdandžić (Germany) Marlon Vankan
August 10	Warsaw, Poland; Hard; M15; Singles and doubles draws	(Latvia) Robert Strombachs; 7–6^{(7–2)}, 6–4	(Germany) Vincent Reisach	(Netherlands) Daniel de Jonge (Egypt) Fares Zakaria	(Italy) Leonardo Rossi (Italy) Filippo Moroni (France) Luc Fomba (Poland) Jakub Solarski
August 10	Warsaw, Poland; Hard; M15; Singles and doubles draws	(Poland) Jan Chłodnicki (Germany) Vincent Reisach; 6–4, 6–2	(Australia) Andy Allen (South Africa) Ethan Terblanche	(Netherlands) Daniel de Jonge (Egypt) Fares Zakaria	(Italy) Leonardo Rossi (Italy) Filippo Moroni (France) Luc Fomba (Poland) Jakub Solarski
August 10	Malmö, Sweden; Clay; M15; Singles and doubles draws	(Sweden) Karl Friberg; 6–3, 6–1	(Sweden) John Hallquist Lithen	(Sweden) Nikola Slavic (Germany) Nino Ehrenschneider	(Sweden) Victor Ryden (Sweden) Didrik Liljekvist (Netherlands) Brian Bozemoj (France) Maxence Bertimon
August 10	Malmö, Sweden; Clay; M15; Singles and doubles draws	(Sweden) Karl Friberg (Sweden) William Rejchtman Vinciguerra; 6–0, 6–2	(Sweden) Eric Ahren Moonga (Sweden) Jonathan Mridha	(Sweden) Nikola Slavic (Germany) Nino Ehrenschneider	(Sweden) Victor Ryden (Sweden) Didrik Liljekvist (Netherlands) Brian Bozemoj (France) Maxence Bertimon
August 10	Turku, Finland; Hard; M15; Singles and doubles draws	(Finland) Oskari Paldanius; 3–6, 7–5, 6–4	(Israel) Amit Vales	(Sweden) Arvid Nordquist (United Kingdom) Oscar Weightman	(Estonia) Markus Mölder (Greece) Dimitris Azoidis (Estonia) Kristjan Tamm (Italy) Andrea Bacaloni
August 10	Turku, Finland; Hard; M15; Singles and doubles draws	(Netherlands) Stian Klaassen (Finland) Iiro Vasa; 4–6, 6–2, [10–5]	(Finland) Felix Alopaeus (Finland) Otso Martikainen	(Sweden) Arvid Nordquist (United Kingdom) Oscar Weightman	(Estonia) Markus Mölder (Greece) Dimitris Azoidis (Estonia) Kristjan Tamm (Italy) Andrea Bacaloni
August 10	Târgu Jiu, Romania; Clay; M15; Singles and doubles draws	(Romania) Vlad Cristian Breazu; 2–6, 6–3, 6–2	(Romania) Rareș Teodor Pieleanu	(Sweden) Dragoș Nicolae Mădăraș (Romania) Gabriel Ghețu	(Italy) Andrea Paolini (Greece) Odysseus Geladaris (Italy) Iannis Miletich (Argentina) Fermín Tenti
August 10	Târgu Jiu, Romania; Clay; M15; Singles and doubles draws	(Italy) Francesco Ferrari (Italy) Federico Valle; 7–6^{(7–5)}, 3–6, [10–3]	(Argentina) Ignacio Monzón (Argentina) Fermín Tenti	(Sweden) Dragoș Nicolae Mădăraș (Romania) Gabriel Ghețu	(Italy) Andrea Paolini (Greece) Odysseus Geladaris (Italy) Iannis Miletich (Argentina) Fermín Tenti
August 10	Asunción, Paraguay; Clay; M15; Singles and doubles draws	(Uruguay) Joaquín Aguilar Cardozo; 6–3, 7–6^{(7–5)}	(Argentina) Gonzalo Villanueva	(Argentina) Santiago de la Fuente (Brazil) Rafael Tosetto	(Uruguay) Federico Aguilar Cardozo (United States) Dakotah Bobo (United States) Maxwell Exsted (Brazil) Nicolas Zanellato
August 10	Asunción, Paraguay; Clay; M15; Singles and doubles draws	(Uruguay) Joaquín Aguilar Cardozo (Argentina) Santiago de la Fuente; 5–7, 6–4, [10–2]	(Argentina) Santiago Giamichelle (Paraguay) Martín Antonio Vergara del Puerto	(Argentina) Santiago de la Fuente (Brazil) Rafael Tosetto	(Uruguay) Federico Aguilar Cardozo (United States) Dakotah Bobo (United States) Maxwell Exsted (Brazil) Nicolas Zanellato
August 17	Taipei, Taiwan; Hard; M25; Singles and doubles draws	(Chinese Taipei) Hsu Yu-hsiou; 6–3, 6–2	(Australia) Matthew Dellavedova	(Japan) Masamichi Imamura (Japan) Shunsuke Mitsui	(Japan) Ryuki Matsuda (South Korea) Chung Hyeon (Chinese Taipei) Wu Tung-lin (Australia) Tai Sach
August 17	Taipei, Taiwan; Hard; M25; Singles and doubles draws	(Japan) Taisei Ichikawa (Japan) Masamichi Imamura; 6–4, 6–1	(Kazakhstan) Grigoriy Lomakin (Estonia) Kristjan Tamm	(Japan) Masamichi Imamura (Japan) Shunsuke Mitsui	(Japan) Ryuki Matsuda (South Korea) Chung Hyeon (Chinese Taipei) Wu Tung-lin (Australia) Tai Sach
August 17	Idanha-a-Nova, Portugal; Hard; M25; Singles and doubles draws	Pavel Lagutin; 6–3, 6–1	(Portugal) Gonçalo Marques	(Portugal) Rodrigo Fernandes (Italy) Andrea Colombo	(South Africa) Philip Henning (France) Mathieu Scaglia (United States) Tristan McCormick (Spain) Alberto Barroso Campos
August 17	Idanha-a-Nova, Portugal; Hard; M25; Singles and doubles draws	(Portugal) Gonçalo Marques (Portugal) João Silva; Walkover	(Italy) Fabrizio Andaloro (Italy) Andrea Colombo	(Portugal) Rodrigo Fernandes (Italy) Andrea Colombo	(South Africa) Philip Henning (France) Mathieu Scaglia (United States) Tristan McCormick (Spain) Alberto Barroso Campos
August 17	Santander, Spain; Clay; M25; Singles and doubles draws	(Spain) Carlos Sánchez Jover; 6–3, 4–0 ret.	(Switzerland) Alexander Ritschard	(Spain) Alejandro Juan Mano (Spain) Sergi Pérez Contri	(Spain) Imanol López Morillo (Spain) Sergi Fita Juan (Venezuela) Ignacio Parisca Romera (Spain) Carlos López Montagud
August 17	Santander, Spain; Clay; M25; Singles and doubles draws	(Spain) Carlos Sánchez Jover (Spain) Pedro Vives Marcos; 6–4, 6–3	(Spain) Alex Blanchar (Spain) Jordi García Mestre	(Spain) Alejandro Juan Mano (Spain) Sergi Pérez Contri	(Spain) Imanol López Morillo (Spain) Sergi Fita Juan (Venezuela) Ignacio Parisca Romera (Spain) Carlos López Montagud
August 17	Überlingen, Germany; Clay; M25; Singles and doubles draws	(France) Arthur Nagel; 6–3, 7–6^{(7–1)}	(Germany) Tim Handel	(Ukraine) Tymur Bieldiugin (Germany) Daniel Masur	(Switzerland) Nicola Senn (Germany) Mika Petkovic (Germany) Jannik Maute (Germany) Maximilian Marterer
August 17	Überlingen, Germany; Clay; M25; Singles and doubles draws	(Italy) Matteo Covato (United States) Gray Voelzke; 6–3, 6–4	(Germany) Liam Gavrielides (Germany) Tim Loosen	(Ukraine) Tymur Bieldiugin (Germany) Daniel Masur	(Switzerland) Nicola Senn (Germany) Mika Petkovic (Germany) Jannik Maute (Germany) Maximilian Marterer
August 17	Lesa, Italy; Clay; M25; Singles and doubles draws	(France) Laurent Lokoli; 3–6, 6–3, 6–0	(Italy) Pierluigi Basile	(Italy) Alexander Weis (Italy) Samuele Seghetti	(Austria) Nico Hipfl (Italy) Giovanni Oradini (Italy) Daniele Rapagnetta (Italy) Andrea De Marchi
August 17	Lesa, Italy; Clay; M25; Singles and doubles draws	(Italy) Gabriele Bosio (Italy) Juan Cruz Martin Manzano; 6–2, 1–6, [11–9]	(Austria) Nico Hipfl (Italy) Giovanni Oradini	(Italy) Alexander Weis (Italy) Samuele Seghetti	(Austria) Nico Hipfl (Italy) Giovanni Oradini (Italy) Daniele Rapagnetta (Italy) Andrea De Marchi
August 17	Slovenj Gradec, Slovenia; Clay; M25; Singles and doubles draws	(Austria) Sebastian Sorger; 6–2, 6–2	(Austria) Jonas Gundacker	(Slovenia) Sebastian Dominko (Slovenia) Filip Jeff Planinšek	(Italy) Giuseppe La Vela (Italy) Luca Castagnola (Argentina) Valerio Aboian (Germany) Frederic Schlossmann
August 17	Slovenj Gradec, Slovenia; Clay; M25; Singles and doubles draws	(United Kingdom) Henry Best (Bosnia and Herzegovina) Ivan Biletić; 6–2, 6–4	(Croatia) Karlo Kajin (Slovenia) Jan Kupčič	(Slovenia) Sebastian Dominko (Slovenia) Filip Jeff Planinšek	(Italy) Giuseppe La Vela (Italy) Luca Castagnola (Argentina) Valerio Aboian (Germany) Frederic Schlossmann
August 17	Ma'anshan, China; Hard (i); M15; Singles and doubles draws	(Indonesia) Muhammad Rifqi Fitriadi; 7–5, 6–3	(Japan) Kokoro Isomura	Petr Bar Biryukov (South Korea) Chung Yun-seong	(China) Zhang Tianhui (Japan) Yusuke Takahashi (South Korea) Kang Ku-keon (New Zealand) Isaac Becroft
August 17	Ma'anshan, China; Hard (i); M15; Singles and doubles draws	(South Korea) Chung Yun-seong (South Korea) Kim Dong-ju; 3–6, 7–5, [10–8]	(Indonesia) Muhammad Rifqi Fitriadi (Armenia) Daniil Sarksian	Petr Bar Biryukov (South Korea) Chung Yun-seong	(China) Zhang Tianhui (Japan) Yusuke Takahashi (South Korea) Kang Ku-keon (New Zealand) Isaac Becroft
August 17	Lambermont, Belgium; Clay; M15; Singles and doubles draws	(Belgium) Romain Faucon; 6–4, 1–6, 7–5	(Belgium) Jack Logé	(Germany) Marlon Vankan (Belgium) Martin van der Meerschen	(Netherlands) Stijn Paardekooper (Germany) Marc Majdandzic (Germany) Rafael Giotis (Netherlands) Deney Wassermann
August 17	Lambermont, Belgium; Clay; M15; Singles and doubles draws	(Netherlands) Stijn Paardekooper (Netherlands) Fons van Sambeek; 6–4, 6–2	(Netherlands) Stian Klaassen (Luxembourg) Louis van Herck	(Germany) Marlon Vankan (Belgium) Martin van der Meerschen	(Netherlands) Stijn Paardekooper (Germany) Marc Majdandzic (Germany) Rafael Giotis (Netherlands) Deney Wassermann
August 17	Mistelbach, Austria; Clay; M15; Singles and doubles draws	(Ukraine) Nikita Mashtakov; 2–6, 6–3, 6–4	(Austria) Thilo Behrmann	(Italy) Gabriele Maria Noce (Poland) Marcel Zieliński	(Austria) David Wallechner (Switzerland) Facundo Yunis (Austria) Alexander Wagner (United States) Theodore Dean
August 17	Mistelbach, Austria; Clay; M15; Singles and doubles draws	(United States) Theodore Dean (United States) Aadarsh Tripathi; 2–6, 7–6^{(7–4)}, [10–4]	(Slovakia) Tomáš Lánik (Slovakia) Radovan Michalík	(Italy) Gabriele Maria Noce (Poland) Marcel Zieliński	(Austria) David Wallechner (Switzerland) Facundo Yunis (Austria) Alexander Wagner (United States) Theodore Dean
August 17	Båstad, Sweden; Clay; M15; Singles and doubles draws	(Germany) Niklas Guttau; 4–6, 6–2, 6–3	(Sweden) Leo Borg	(Sweden) John Hallquist Lithen (Sweden) Jan Simonsson	(Germany) Stefan Seifert (Italy) Davide Tortora (Sweden) Jonathan Mridha (Sweden) Kevin Edengren
August 17	Båstad, Sweden; Clay; M15; Singles and doubles draws	(United States) Jayson Blando (United States) Oren Vasser; 5–7, 6–4, [10–8]	(Sweden) Karl Friberg (Sweden) William Rejchtman Vinciguerra	(Sweden) John Hallquist Lithen (Sweden) Jan Simonsson	(Germany) Stefan Seifert (Italy) Davide Tortora (Sweden) Jonathan Mridha (Sweden) Kevin Edengren
August 17	Kraków, Poland; Clay; M15; Singles and doubles draws	(Poland) Daniel Michalski; 6–2, 3–0 ret.	(Republic of Ireland) Michael Agwi	(Poland) Jan Sadzik (Poland) Pawel Juszczak	(Germany) Tom Zeuch (Hungary) Achilles Belkovics (Hungary) Máté Valkusz (Poland) Wojciech Marek
August 17	Kraków, Poland; Clay; M15; Singles and doubles draws	(Poland) Oskar Grzegorzewski (Poland) Jan Sadzik; 6–4, 6–4	(Poland) Jakub Januchowski (Poland) Karol Romer	(Poland) Jan Sadzik (Poland) Pawel Juszczak	(Germany) Tom Zeuch (Hungary) Achilles Belkovics (Hungary) Máté Valkusz (Poland) Wojciech Marek
August 17	Arad, Romania; Clay; M15; Singles and doubles draws	(Italy) Matteo Sciahbasi; 6–3, 7–6^{(7–0)}	(Italy) Iannis Miletich	(Sweden) Dragoș Nicolae Mădăraș (Romania) Robert Guna	(Romania) Tudor Batin (Italy) Giannicola Misasi (Argentina) Ignacio Monzón (Argentina) Fermín Tenti
August 17	Arad, Romania; Clay; M15; Singles and doubles draws	(United States) Preston Brown (Italy) Iannis Miletich; 6–3, 6–7^{(1–7)}, [11–9]	(Romania) Ștefan Adrian Andreescu (Romania) Gheorghe Claudiu Schinteie	(Sweden) Dragoș Nicolae Mădăraș (Romania) Robert Guna	(Romania) Tudor Batin (Italy) Giannicola Misasi (Argentina) Ignacio Monzón (Argentina) Fermín Tenti
August 17	Kuršumlijska Banja, Serbia; Clay; M15; Singles and doubles draws	(Bulgaria) Dimitar Kisimov; 1–6, 6–4, 7–5	(Serbia) Kristijan Juhas	Semen Pankin; Anton Arzhankin	(Romania) Ștefan Horia Haita; Timofei Derepasko; Ruslan Tiukaev (Kazakhstan) Dmitry Popko
August 17	Kuršumlijska Banja, Serbia; Clay; M15; Singles and doubles draws	Anton Arzhankin; Egor Khotchenkov; 2–6, 6–1, [10–8]	(Spain) Mario Arce Fernandez (Spain) Esteban Talavera Cortes	Semen Pankin; Anton Arzhankin	(Romania) Ștefan Horia Haita; Timofei Derepasko; Ruslan Tiukaev (Kazakhstan) Dmitry Popko
August 17	Asunción, Paraguay; Clay; M15; Singles and doubles draws	(Uruguay) Joaquín Aguilar Cardozo; 6–3, 6–1	(Argentina) Gonzalo Villanueva	(United States) Dakotah Bobo (United States) Maxwell Exsted	(Chile) Bastián Malla (Argentina) Julián Cúndom (Argentina) Santiago de la Fuente (Mexico) Rodrigo Alujas
August 17	Asunción, Paraguay; Clay; M15; Singles and doubles draws	(Argentina) Santiago Giamichelle (Paraguay) Martín Antonio Vergara del Puerto; 3–6, 6–3, [11–9]	(Paraguay) Alvaro Ariel Frutos Alonso (Paraguay) Alex Santino Nuñez Vera	(United States) Dakotah Bobo (United States) Maxwell Exsted	(Chile) Bastián Malla (Argentina) Julián Cúndom (Argentina) Santiago de la Fuente (Mexico) Rodrigo Alujas
August 24	Taipei, Taiwan; Hard; M25; Singles and doubles draws	(Chinese Taipei) Chen Kuan-shou; 6–4, 4–6, 6–4	(Australia) Matthew Dellavedova	(Switzerland) Luca Castelnuovo (Thailand) Kasidit Samrej	(Turkey) Yankı Erel (South Korea) Chung Hyeon (Estonia) Kristjan Tamm (Chinese Taipei) Chen Yan-cheng
August 24	Taipei, Taiwan; Hard; M25; Singles and doubles draws	(India) Nitin Kumar Sinha (India) Manish Sureshkumar; 6–3, 6–4	(Japan) Shinji Hazawa (Japan) Taisei Ichikawa	(Switzerland) Luca Castelnuovo (Thailand) Kasidit Samrej	(Turkey) Yankı Erel (South Korea) Chung Hyeon (Estonia) Kristjan Tamm (Chinese Taipei) Chen Yan-cheng
August 24	Oviedo, Spain; Clay; M25; Singles and doubles draws	(Switzerland) Alexander Ritschard; 7–6^{(7–4)}, 7–6^{(7–4)}	(Spain) Sergi Pérez Contri	Ivan Gakhov (Spain) Pedro Ródenas	Yaroslav Demin (Bulgaria) Yanaki Milev (Spain) Carles Hernández (Spain) Pedro Vives Marcos
August 24	Oviedo, Spain; Clay; M25; Singles and doubles draws	(Spain) Alejandro García Carbajal (Spain) Mario Mansilla Díez; 6–2, 7–5	(Spain) Pablo Aunion (Spain) Xavi Palomar	Ivan Gakhov (Spain) Pedro Ródenas	Yaroslav Demin (Bulgaria) Yanaki Milev (Spain) Carles Hernández (Spain) Pedro Vives Marcos
August 24	Oldenzaal, Netherlands; Clay; M25; Singles and doubles draws	(Germany) Louis Wessels; 7–5, 6–1	(Ukraine) Eric Vanshelboim	(Germany) Luca Wiedenmann (Netherlands) Daniel Verbeek	(Netherlands) Sander Jong (Belgium) Émilien Demanet (Italy) Lorenzo Angelini (Netherlands) Pieter de Lange
August 24	Oldenzaal, Netherlands; Clay; M25; Singles and doubles draws	(Netherlands) Stijn Paardekooper (Netherlands) Fons van Sambeek; 7–5, 6–4	(Germany) Karim Al-Amin (Germany) Louis Wessels	(Germany) Luca Wiedenmann (Netherlands) Daniel Verbeek	(Netherlands) Sander Jong (Belgium) Émilien Demanet (Italy) Lorenzo Angelini (Netherlands) Pieter de Lange
August 24	Lausanne, Switzerland; Clay; M25; Singles and doubles draws	(Switzerland) Henry Bernet; 6–4, 6–2	Andrey Chepelev	(Italy) Lorenzo Carboni (Switzerland) Adrien Burdet	(Germany) Nino Ehrenschneider (Switzerland) Noah Karma (Ukraine) Oleksandr Ovcharenko (France) Florent Lagarrigue
August 24	Lausanne, Switzerland; Clay; M25; Singles and doubles draws	(Switzerland) Adrien Burdet (Switzerland) Johan Nikles; 6–4, 5–7, [11–9]	(France) Marko Maric (Serbia) Tadija Radovanović	(Italy) Lorenzo Carboni (Switzerland) Adrien Burdet	(Germany) Nino Ehrenschneider (Switzerland) Noah Karma (Ukraine) Oleksandr Ovcharenko (France) Florent Lagarrigue
August 24	Poznań, Poland; Clay; M25; Singles and doubles draws	(Poland) Daniel Michalski; 6–2, 6–1	(United States) Michael Savano	(Ukraine) Nikita Mashtakov (Poland) Filip Pieczonka	(Czech Republic) Matyáš Černý (Ukraine) Vladyslav Orlov (South Korea) Gerard Campaña Lee (Germany) Niklas Guttau
August 24	Poznań, Poland; Clay; M25; Singles and doubles draws	(Poland) Piotr Matuszewski (Poland) Jan Werbliński; 6–4, 1–6, [10–8]	(Argentina) Valentín Basel (Argentina) Franco Ribero	(Ukraine) Nikita Mashtakov (Poland) Filip Pieczonka	(Czech Republic) Matyáš Černý (Ukraine) Vladyslav Orlov (South Korea) Gerard Campaña Lee (Germany) Niklas Guttau
August 24	Maribor, Slovenia; Clay; M25; Singles and doubles draws	(Slovenia) Sebastian Dominko; 4–6, 6–3, 6–4	(Italy) Samuele Pieri	(Austria) Sebastian Sorger (Slovenia) Filip Jeff Planinšek	(Italy) Andrea de Marchi (Italy) Giuseppe La Vela (Argentina) Valerio Aboian (Bulgaria) Dimitar Kuzmanov
August 24	Maribor, Slovenia; Clay; M25; Singles and doubles draws	(Slovenia) Sebastian Dominko (Slovenia) Filip Jeff Planinšek; 7–5, 6–2	(United States) Theodore Dean (United States) Aadarsh Tripathi	(Austria) Sebastian Sorger (Slovenia) Filip Jeff Planinšek	(Italy) Andrea de Marchi (Italy) Giuseppe La Vela (Argentina) Valerio Aboian (Bulgaria) Dimitar Kuzmanov
August 24	Ma'anshan, China; Hard (i); M15; Singles and doubles draws	(China) Te Rigele; 5–7, 6–2, 6–4	(China) Zhang Tianhui	(Australia) Enzo Aguiard (Australia) Chase Ferguson	(China) Zhao Lingxi (Japan) Yusuke Takahashi (Australia) Joshua Charlton (China) Jiang Fumin
August 24	Ma'anshan, China; Hard (i); M15; Singles and doubles draws	(China) Jin Yuquan (China) Sun Qian; 3–6, 6–2, [13–11]	Petr Bar Biryukov (Uzbekistan) Sergey Fomin	(Australia) Enzo Aguiard (Australia) Chase Ferguson	(China) Zhao Lingxi (Japan) Yusuke Takahashi (Australia) Joshua Charlton (China) Jiang Fumin
August 24	Cap d'Agde, France; Clay; M15; Singles and doubles draws	(France) Maxime Chazal; 6–2, 6–4	(France) Kenny de Schepper	(France) Pierre Antoine Tailleu (France) Pierre Delage	(France) Liam Branger (France) Ferdinand Livet Novkirichka (France) Lenny Couturier (France) Mathieu Scaglia
August 24	Cap d'Agde, France; Clay; M15; Singles and doubles draws	(Morocco) Samy Iraqi (Latvia) Artūrs Žagars; 6–4, 6–3	(Japan) Yuto Hisano (Canada) Filip Malis	(France) Pierre Antoine Tailleu (France) Pierre Delage	(France) Liam Branger (France) Ferdinand Livet Novkirichka (France) Lenny Couturier (France) Mathieu Scaglia
August 24	Allershausen, Germany; Clay; M15; Singles and doubles draws	(Germany) Jannik Maute; 6–2, 7–6^{(7–4)}	(Germany) Calvin Müller	(Argentina) Thiago Cigarrán (Czech Republic) Jakub Filip	(Germany) Jaron Held (Sweden) William Rejchtman Vinciguerra (Germany) Nikolai Barsukov (Syria) Hazem Naw
August 24	Allershausen, Germany; Clay; M15; Singles and doubles draws	(Czech Republic) Adam Duda (Czech Republic) Max Frohlich; 6–1, 6–4	(Germany) David Eichenseher (Germany) Maximilian Alessandro Erhardt	(Argentina) Thiago Cigarrán (Czech Republic) Jakub Filip	(Germany) Jaron Held (Sweden) William Rejchtman Vinciguerra (Germany) Nikolai Barsukov (Syria) Hazem Naw
August 24	Vienna, Austria; Clay; M15; Singles and doubles draws	(Slovakia) Andrej Martin; 6–0, 6–1	(Italy) Manuel Plunger	(Italy) Giovanni Oradini (Ukraine) Heorhii Shylov	(Italy) Lorenzo Rottoli (Greece) Pavlos Tsitsipas (Poland) Marcel Zieliński (Argentina) Juan Ignacio Gallego
August 24	Vienna, Austria; Clay; M15; Singles and doubles draws	(Ukraine) Aleksandr Braynin (Norway) Leyton Rivera; 7–6^{(7–4)}, 7–6^{(7–5)}	(France) Corentin Denolly (Greece) Pavlos Tsitsipas	(Italy) Giovanni Oradini (Ukraine) Heorhii Shylov	(Italy) Lorenzo Rottoli (Greece) Pavlos Tsitsipas (Poland) Marcel Zieliński (Argentina) Juan Ignacio Gallego
August 24	Pécs, Hungary; Clay; M15; Singles and doubles draws	(Germany) John Sperle; 4–6, 6–2, 6–3	(Argentina) Ignacio Monzón	(Czech Republic) Štěpán Baum (Sweden) John Hallquist Lithen	(Italy) Lorenzo Bocchi (Slovakia) Filip Drab (Hungary) Trisztan Gubi (Italy) Andrea Paolini
August 24	Pécs, Hungary; Clay; M15; Singles and doubles draws	(Czech Republic) Jan Hrazdil (Slovakia) Tomáš Lánik; 6–3, 6–3	(United Kingdom) Jeremy Gschwendtner (Argentina) Fermín Tenti	(Czech Republic) Štěpán Baum (Sweden) John Hallquist Lithen	(Italy) Lorenzo Bocchi (Slovakia) Filip Drab (Hungary) Trisztan Gubi (Italy) Andrea Paolini
August 24	Bucharest, Romania; Clay; M15; Singles and doubles draws	(Romania) Radu David Țurcanu; 6–2, 6–3	(Romania) Gabriel Ghețu	(Romania) Vlad Cristian Breazu (Bulgaria) Anas Mazdrashki	(Romania) Robert Guna (Sweden) Dragoș Nicolae Mădăraș (Romania) Ștefan Adrian Andreescu (Romania) Sebastian Gima
August 24	Bucharest, Romania; Clay; M15; Singles and doubles draws	(Romania) Gabriel Ghețu (Romania) Vladislav Melnic; 6–3, 1–6, [10–7]	(Romania) Cezar Stefan Bentzel (Romania) Stefan Ilie Bogdan Petre	(Romania) Vlad Cristian Breazu (Bulgaria) Anas Mazdrashki	(Romania) Robert Guna (Sweden) Dragoș Nicolae Mădăraș (Romania) Ștefan Adrian Andreescu (Romania) Sebastian Gima
August 24	Kuršumlijska Banja, Serbia; Clay; M15; Singles and doubles draws	(Serbia) Branko Đurić; 6–2, 6–7^{(4–7)}, 6–3	(Kazakhstan) Dmitry Popko	(Italy) Andrea Motta (Serbia) Kristijan Juhas	(Bulgaria) George Lazarov (France) Antoni Fabre; Anton Arzhankin (Italy) Stefano D'Agostino
August 24	Kuršumlijska Banja, Serbia; Clay; M15; Singles and doubles draws	(Italy) Filiberto Fumagalli (Italy) Matteo Liusso; 7–6^{(7–4)}, 4–6, [10–2]	(Serbia) Aleksa Oparnica (India) Caheer Warik	(Italy) Andrea Motta (Serbia) Kristijan Juhas	(Bulgaria) George Lazarov (France) Antoni Fabre; Anton Arzhankin (Italy) Stefano D'Agostino
August 24	Hurghada, Egypt; Hard; M15; Singles and doubles draws	(India) Dev Javia; 6–2, 6–3	(Germany) Aaron Funk	(Morocco) Yassine Smiej (Georgia (country)) Aleksandre Bakshi	(Slovakia) Michal Krajčí; Nikita Ianin; Dmitry Bessonov (Italy) Lorenzo Lorusso
August 24	Hurghada, Egypt; Hard; M15; Singles and doubles draws	(India) Chirag Duhan (India) Dev Javia; 6–4, 6–3	(Egypt) Amr Elsayed (Egypt) Karim Ibrahim	(Morocco) Yassine Smiej (Georgia (country)) Aleksandre Bakshi	(Slovakia) Michal Krajčí; Nikita Ianin; Dmitry Bessonov (Italy) Lorenzo Lorusso
August 24	Monastir, Tunisia; Hard; M15; Singles and doubles draws	(France) Nicolas Jadoun; 3–6, 6–2, 3–0 ret.	(France) Daniel Jade	(France) Mathys Domenc (Algeria) Toufik Sahtali	(France) Robin Bertrand (United Kingdom) Roan Jones (Kazakhstan) Amir Omarkhanov (France) Louis Larue
August 24	Monastir, Tunisia; Hard; M15; Singles and doubles draws	(Zimbabwe) Benjamin Lock (Algeria) Toufik Sahtali; 7–5, 6–0	(United Kingdom) Rahul Dhokia (United Kingdom) Roan Jones	(France) Mathys Domenc (Algeria) Toufik Sahtali	(France) Robin Bertrand (United Kingdom) Roan Jones (Kazakhstan) Amir Omarkhanov (France) Louis Larue
August 24	Champaign, United States; Hard; M15; Singles and doubles draws	(United States) Bryce Nakashima; 6–2, 7–6^{(8–6)}	(Czech Republic) Jakub Vrba	(United Kingdom) Oliver Okonkwo (United States) Preston Stearns	(Israel) Ofek Shimanov (United States) Felix Corwin (United States) Jack Anthrop (United States) Marko Mesarovic
August 24	Champaign, United States; Hard; M15; Singles and doubles draws	(Costa Rica) Jesse Flores (Monaco) Rocco Piatti; 4–6, 6–4, [10–8]	(Canada) Adam Farag Cao (Canada) Joshua Peck	(United Kingdom) Oliver Okonkwo (United States) Preston Stearns	(Israel) Ofek Shimanov (United States) Felix Corwin (United States) Jack Anthrop (United States) Marko Mesarovic
August 24	Mar del Plata, Argentina; Clay; M15; Singles and doubles draws	(Uruguay) Joaquín Aguilar Cardozo; 6–2, 6–2	(Argentina) Carlos María Zárate	(Argentina) Gonzalo Villanueva (Chile) Bastián Malla	(Argentina) Santiago de la Fuente (Argentina) Lorenzo Gagliardo (Argentina) Máximo Zeitune (Argentina) Tomas Martinez
August 24	Mar del Plata, Argentina; Clay; M15; Singles and doubles draws	(Argentina) Lorenzo Gagliardo (Argentina) Rocco Valente; 6–2, 6–4	(Argentina) Santiago de la Fuente (Argentina) Sean Hess	(Argentina) Gonzalo Villanueva (Chile) Bastián Malla	(Argentina) Santiago de la Fuente (Argentina) Lorenzo Gagliardo (Argentina) Máximo Zeitune (Argentina) Tomas Martinez
August 31	Urayasu, Japan; Hard; M25; Singles and doubles draws	(Japan) Naoki Nakagawa; 6–3, 7–6^{(7–5)}	(Japan) Ryuki Matsuda	(Turkey) Yankı Erel (Chinese Taipei) Lee Kuan-yi	(Japan) Keisuke Saitoh (Japan) Shunsuke Mitsui (Japan) Ryota Tanuma (Japan) Sora Fukuda
August 31	Urayasu, Japan; Hard; M25; Singles and doubles draws	(Japan) Yusuke Kusuhara (Japan) Shunsuke Nakagawa; 6–4, 6–4	(Japan) Shunsuke Mitsui (Japan) Naoki Nakagawa	(Turkey) Yankı Erel (Chinese Taipei) Lee Kuan-yi	(Japan) Keisuke Saitoh (Japan) Shunsuke Mitsui (Japan) Ryota Tanuma (Japan) Sora Fukuda
August 31	Bagnères-de-Bigorre, France; Hard; M25+H; Singles and doubles draws	(France) Raphael Perot; 4–6, 6–2, 6–3	(France) Robin Bertrand	(Spain) John Echeverría (Luxembourg) Alex Knaff	(France) Dan Added (France) Matisse Bobichon (Egypt) Fares Zakaria (France) Alexandre Reco
August 31	Bagnères-de-Bigorre, France; Hard; M25+H; Singles and doubles draws	(France) Guillaume Dalmasso (France) Benjamin Pietri; 6–2, 6–4	(France) Adan Freire da Silva (France) Axel Garcian	(Spain) John Echeverría (Luxembourg) Alex Knaff	(France) Dan Added (France) Matisse Bobichon (Egypt) Fares Zakaria (France) Alexandre Reco
August 31	Meerbusch, Germany; Clay; M25; Singles and doubles draws	(Germany) Adrian Oetzbach; 6–3, 6–0	(Finland) Eero Vasa	(Brazil) Bruno Fernandez (Belgium) Romain Faucon	(Argentina) Lucio Ratti (Greece) Dimitris Sakellaridis (United States) Amar Tahirovic (Germany) Nino Ehrenschneider
August 31	Meerbusch, Germany; Clay; M25; Singles and doubles draws	(Finland) Eero Vasa (Finland) Iiro Vasa; 6–3, 6–1	(Brazil) Bruno Fernandez (Argentina) Lucio Ratti	(Brazil) Bruno Fernandez (Belgium) Romain Faucon	(Argentina) Lucio Ratti (Greece) Dimitris Sakellaridis (United States) Amar Tahirovic (Germany) Nino Ehrenschneider
August 31	Casablanca, Morocco; Clay; M25; Singles and doubles draws	(Netherlands) Max Houkes; 6–7^{(5–7)}, 6–3, 7–6^{(7–4)}	(Morocco) Karim Bennani	(Belgium) Jack Logé (Morocco) Yassine Dlimi	(France) Pierre Delage; Yaroslav Demin (Argentina) Thiago Cigarrán (France) Arthur Nagel
August 31	Casablanca, Morocco; Clay; M25; Singles and doubles draws	(Germany) Niklas Schell (Greece) Petros Tsitsipas; 7–5, 7–5	(Argentina) Thiago Cigarrán (Italy) Noah Perfetti	(Belgium) Jack Logé (Morocco) Yassine Dlimi	(France) Pierre Delage; Yaroslav Demin (Argentina) Thiago Cigarrán (France) Arthur Nagel
August 31	Bali, Indonesia; Hard; M15; Singles and doubles draws	(India) Karan Singh; 7–5, 7–6^{(7–3)}	(New Zealand) Isaac Becroft	(Japan) Ryotaro Taguchi (Sweden) Leo Borg	(Australia) Hayden Jones (Indonesia) Nathan Anthony Barki (Australia) Sam Ryan Ziegann (India) Digvijaypratap Singh
August 31	Bali, Indonesia; Hard; M15; Singles and doubles draws	(United States) Alexander Chang (Spain) Pablo Perez Ramos; 6–3, 7–6^{(7–1)}	(Indonesia) Rafalentino Ali Da Costa (Indonesia) Ethan David Zapp	(Japan) Ryotaro Taguchi (Sweden) Leo Borg	(Australia) Hayden Jones (Indonesia) Nathan Anthony Barki (Australia) Sam Ryan Ziegann (India) Digvijaypratap Singh
August 31	Nonthaburi, Thailand; Hard; M15; Singles and doubles draws	(France) Arthur Weber; 7–5, 7–6^{(7–5)}	(Australia) Moerani Bouzige	(France) Florent Bax (Thailand) Thantub Suksumrarn	(India) Manish Sureshkumar (France) Julien De Cuyper (India) Mukund Sasikumar (Thailand) Thanapet Chanta
August 31	Nonthaburi, Thailand; Hard; M15; Singles and doubles draws	(Philippines) Francis Alcantara (Thailand) Pawit Sornlaksup; 7–6^{(7–4)}, 5–7, [10–8]	(India) Maan Kesharwani (India) Manish Sureshkumar	(France) Florent Bax (Thailand) Thantub Suksumrarn	(India) Manish Sureshkumar (France) Julien De Cuyper (India) Mukund Sasikumar (Thailand) Thanapet Chanta
August 31	Wuning, China; Hard; M15; Singles and doubles draws	(Japan) Yuta Tomida; 6–2, 6–3	(China) Sun Qian	(Northern Mariana Islands) Colin Sinclair (South Korea) Kim Geun-jun	(China) Yang Zijiang (United States) Miles Jones (Estonia) Kristjan Tamm (Australia) Harrison Satara
August 31	Wuning, China; Hard; M15; Singles and doubles draws	(China) Jin Yuquan (China) Sun Qian; 6–4, 3–6, [10–3]	(South Korea) Choe Jae-sung (South Korea) Kim Geun-jun	(Northern Mariana Islands) Colin Sinclair (South Korea) Kim Geun-jun	(China) Yang Zijiang (United States) Miles Jones (Estonia) Kristjan Tamm (Australia) Harrison Satara
August 31	Madrid, Spain; Clay; M15; Singles and doubles draws	(Netherlands) Ryan Nijboer; 6–4, 7–6^{(7–4)}	(Belgium) Martin van der Meerschen	(Spain) Alejandro Manzanera Pertusa (Spain) Pedro Ródenas	(Spain) Bernardo Munk Mesa (Spain) Enrique Carrascosa Díaz (Spain) Alejandro García Carbajal (Netherlands) Michiel de Krom
August 31	Madrid, Spain; Clay; M15; Singles and doubles draws	(United States) Theodore Dean (United States) Aadarsh Tripathi; 6–2, 7–6^{(7–2)}	(Spain) Sergi Fita Juan (Spain) Bernardo Munk Mesa	(Spain) Alejandro Manzanera Pertusa (Spain) Pedro Ródenas	(Spain) Bernardo Munk Mesa (Spain) Enrique Carrascosa Díaz (Spain) Alejandro García Carbajal (Netherlands) Michiel de Krom
August 31	Haren, Netherlands; Clay; M15; Singles and doubles draws	(Netherlands) Sander Jong; 6–4, 6–1	(Netherlands) Deney Wassermann	(Brazil) João Victor Couto Loureiro (Netherlands) Pieter de Lange	(Netherlands) Dax Donders (Netherlands) Elgin Khoeblal (Netherlands) Stijn Paardekooper (Netherlands) Fons van Sambeek
August 31	Haren, Netherlands; Clay; M15; Singles and doubles draws	(Netherlands) Mac Visser (Netherlands) Lars Wagenaar; 6–4, 6–4	(Netherlands) Sander Jong (Netherlands) Rik Muller	(Brazil) João Victor Couto Loureiro (Netherlands) Pieter de Lange	(Netherlands) Dax Donders (Netherlands) Elgin Khoeblal (Netherlands) Stijn Paardekooper (Netherlands) Fons van Sambeek
August 31	Bologna, Italy; Clay; M15; Singles and doubles draws	(Italy) Manuel Mazza; 5–7, 6–4, 6–3	(Italy) Gabriele Bosio	(Italy) Lorenzo Berto (Italy) Gabriele Crivellaro	(Italy) Tobia Costanzo Baragiola (United Kingdom) Blu Baker (Italy) Gabriele Maria Noce (Italy) Leonardo Primucci
August 31	Bologna, Italy; Clay; M15; Singles and doubles draws	(Italy) Enrico Baldisserri (Italy) Jacopo Bilardo; 6–3, 6–1	(Italy) Alessandro Dragoni (Italy) Tommaso Filippi	(Italy) Lorenzo Berto (Italy) Gabriele Crivellaro	(Italy) Tobia Costanzo Baragiola (United Kingdom) Blu Baker (Italy) Gabriele Maria Noce (Italy) Leonardo Primucci
August 31	Szczawno-Zdrój, Poland; Clay; M15; Singles and doubles draws	(Sweden) John Hallquist Lithen; 6–4, 6–4	(Finland) Linus Lagerbohm	(Republic of Ireland) Michael Agwi (Poland) Pawel Juszczak	(Poland) Jan Chłodnicki (Colombia) Daniel Salazar (Germany) Calvin Müller (Germany) David Eichenseher
August 31	Szczawno-Zdrój, Poland; Clay; M15; Singles and doubles draws	(Sweden) John Hallquist Lithen (Finland) Linus Lagerbohm; 6–4, 6–2	(Czech Republic) Daniel Blažka (Czech Republic) Patrik Homola	(Republic of Ireland) Michael Agwi (Poland) Pawel Juszczak	(Poland) Jan Chłodnicki (Colombia) Daniel Salazar (Germany) Calvin Müller (Germany) David Eichenseher
August 31	Buzău, Romania; Clay; M15; Singles and doubles draws	(Sweden) Dragoș Nicolae Mădăraș; 6–3, 1–6, 6–4	(Italy) Nicola Rispoli	(Romania) Ștefan Adrian Andreescu (United Kingdom) Jeremy Gschwendtner	(Romania) Matei Florin Breazu (Romania) Rareș Teodor Pieleanu (Italy) Pietro Marino (Romania) Tudor Batin
August 31	Buzău, Romania; Clay; M15; Singles and doubles draws	(Italy) Francesco Ferrari (United Kingdom) Jeremy Gschwendtner; 6–3, 6–1	(Romania) Eduard Gabriel Coreisa (Romania) Andrei-Cristian Jinga	(Romania) Ștefan Adrian Andreescu (United Kingdom) Jeremy Gschwendtner	(Romania) Matei Florin Breazu (Romania) Rareș Teodor Pieleanu (Italy) Pietro Marino (Romania) Tudor Batin
August 31	Kuršumlijska Banja, Serbia; Clay; M15; Singles and doubles draws	(Serbia) Branko Đurić; 6–7^{(3–7)}, 6–2, 6–4	(Kazakhstan) Dmitry Popko	(Uzbekistan) Nikita Belozertsev (France) Alexandre Aubriot	(France) Antoni Fabre (Bosnia and Herzegovina) Dražen Petrović (Italy) Stefano D'Agostino (Serbia) Boris Butulija
August 31	Kuršumlijska Banja, Serbia; Clay; M15; Singles and doubles draws	(Uzbekistan) Nikita Belozertsev (Turkey) Cem Christopher Kucukhuseyin; 6–7^{(4–7)}, 7–5, [10–7]	(Italy) Stefano D'Agostino (Serbia) Vuk Radjenovic	(Uzbekistan) Nikita Belozertsev (France) Alexandre Aubriot	(France) Antoni Fabre (Bosnia and Herzegovina) Dražen Petrović (Italy) Stefano D'Agostino (Serbia) Boris Butulija
August 31	Hurghada, Egypt; Hard; M15; Singles and doubles draws	(India) Dev Javia; 4–6, 7–6^{(7–2)}, 6–0	(India) Chirag Duhan	(Republic of Ireland) Conor Gannon (United States) Jake Fellows	(Netherlands) Thijs Boogaard (Slovakia) Michal Krajčí (India) Aditya Balsekar; Marat Salbiev
August 31	Hurghada, Egypt; Hard; M15; Singles and doubles draws	(India) Rohan Mehra (Kuwait) Essa Qabazard; 7–6^{(11–9)}, 6–3	(India) Aryan Lakshmanan (Italy) Lorenzo Lorusso	(Republic of Ireland) Conor Gannon (United States) Jake Fellows	(Netherlands) Thijs Boogaard (Slovakia) Michal Krajčí (India) Aditya Balsekar; Marat Salbiev
August 31	Monastir, Tunisia; Hard; M15; Singles and doubles draws	(Tunisia) Aziz Dougaz; 6–3, 6–2	(France) César Bouchelaghem	(United Kingdom) Roan Jones (Spain) Jorge Plans	(France) Hugo Car (France) Valentin Lapalu (Tunisia) Aziz Ouakaa (France) Nicolas Jadoun
August 31	Monastir, Tunisia; Hard; M15; Singles and doubles draws	(Republic of Ireland) Ammar Elamin (Tunisia) Adam Nagoudi; 5–7, 7–5, [10–6]	(United Kingdom) Rahul Dhokia (United Kingdom) Roan Jones	(United Kingdom) Roan Jones (Spain) Jorge Plans	(France) Hugo Car (France) Valentin Lapalu (Tunisia) Aziz Ouakaa (France) Nicolas Jadoun
August 31	Porto Velho, Brazil; Hard; M15; Singles and doubles draws	(Brazil) Victor Pagotto; 7–6^{(7–4)}, 7–5	(Brazil) Mateus Alves	(Brazil) Rafael Tosetto (Brazil) João Eduardo Schiessl	(Brazil) Gabriel Schenekenberg (Brazil) Enzo Crevelaro (Chile) Daniel Antonio Núñez (Brazil) Luiz Felipe Silva
August 31	Porto Velho, Brazil; Hard; M15; Singles and doubles draws	(Brazil) Kaue Noatto (Brazil) Kaua Lorenzo Santos Gava; 7–6^{(7–3)}, 7–6^{(7–1)}	(Brazil) Enzo Lima (Brazil) Andre Souza	(Brazil) Rafael Tosetto (Brazil) João Eduardo Schiessl	(Brazil) Gabriel Schenekenberg (Brazil) Enzo Crevelaro (Chile) Daniel Antonio Núñez (Brazil) Luiz Felipe Silva
August 31	Trelew, Argentina; Hard (i); M15; Singles and doubles draws	(Argentina) Carlos María Zárate; 6–3, 6–4	(Argentina) Lorenzo Gagliardo	(United States) Felix Corwin (Uruguay) Federico Aguilar Cardozo	(Argentina) Valentino Grippo (Argentina) Tomas Martinez (Argentina) Ivan Dreycopp (Argentina) Julián Cúndom
August 31	Trelew, Argentina; Hard (i); M15; Singles and doubles draws	(Uruguay) Federico Aguilar Cardozo (Argentina) Mateo del Pino; 6–2, 2–6, [13–11]	(United States) Felix Corwin (United States) Noah Schachter	(United States) Felix Corwin (Uruguay) Federico Aguilar Cardozo	(Argentina) Valentino Grippo (Argentina) Tomas Martinez (Argentina) Ivan Dreycopp (Argentina) Julián Cúndom

=== September ===
Week of	Tournament	Winner	Runners-up	Semifinalists	Quarterfinalists
September 7	Sapporo, Japan; Hard; M25; Singles and doubles draws	(Japan) Keisuke Saitoh; 1–6, 6–3, 6–3	(United States) Jerry Roddick	(Australia) Chase Ferguson (South Korea) Hong Seong-chan	(South Korea) Chung Yun-seong (South Korea) Shin San-hui (Chinese Taipei) Lee Kuan-yi (Japan) Hikaru Shiraishi
September 7	Sapporo, Japan; Hard; M25; Singles and doubles draws	(South Korea) Cho Seong-woo (South Korea) Chung Yun-seong; 7–6^{(7–2)}, 3–6, [10–7]	(Japan) Yu Tanaka (Japan) Saki Tange	(Australia) Chase Ferguson (South Korea) Hong Seong-chan	(South Korea) Chung Yun-seong (South Korea) Shin San-hui (Chinese Taipei) Lee Kuan-yi (Japan) Hikaru Shiraishi
September 7	Sintra, Portugal; Hard; M25; Singles and doubles draws	(Switzerland) Patrick Schoen; 6–4, 7–6^{(7–5)}	(Portugal) Gonçalo Marques	(United States) Jack Anthrop (Italy) Fausto Tabacco	(Portugal) Miguel Semedo (Portugal) Francisco Rocha (United Kingdom) Finn Murgett (Portugal) Tiago Cação
September 7	Sintra, Portugal; Hard; M25; Singles and doubles draws	(United Kingdom) James MacKinlay (United Kingdom) Finn Murgett; 6–2, 3–6, [10–4]	(Portugal) Guilherme Valdoleiros (Republic of Ireland) Michael Wright	(United States) Jack Anthrop (Italy) Fausto Tabacco	(Portugal) Miguel Semedo (Portugal) Francisco Rocha (United Kingdom) Finn Murgett (Portugal) Tiago Cação
September 7	Gijón, Spain; Clay; M25; Singles and doubles draws	(Netherlands) Ryan Nijboer; 6–3, 6–1	(Netherlands) Sander Jong	(Bulgaria) Anas Mazdrashki (Spain) Roberto Perez Socas	(Venezuela) Ignacio Parisca (Spain) Xavi Palomar (Argentina) Juan Ignacio Gallego (United States) Richard Zusman
September 7	Gijón, Spain; Clay; M25; Singles and doubles draws	(United States) Theodore Dean (United States) Aadarsh Tripathi; 6–2, 6–3	(Spain) Vicente Alcaraz Galbis (Spain) Nikola Djukic Valera	(Bulgaria) Anas Mazdrashki (Spain) Roberto Perez Socas	(Venezuela) Ignacio Parisca (Spain) Xavi Palomar (Argentina) Juan Ignacio Gallego (United States) Richard Zusman
September 7	Plaisir, France; Hard (i); M25+H; Singles and doubles draws	(France) Clément Chidekh; 7–6^{(7–5)}, 6–1	(United States) Samir Banerjee	(Slovenia) Sebastian Dominko (Germany) Patrick Zahraj	(Bulgaria) Alexander Vasilev (Sweden) Nikola Slavic (United Kingdom) Toby Martin (France) Mickael Kaouk
September 7	Plaisir, France; Hard (i); M25+H; Singles and doubles draws	(France) Adan Freire da Silva (France) Matt Ponchet; 7–6^{(7–2)}, 4–6, [10–7]	(United States) Samir Banerjee (Poland) Piotr Pawlak	(Slovenia) Sebastian Dominko (Germany) Patrick Zahraj	(Bulgaria) Alexander Vasilev (Sweden) Nikola Slavic (United Kingdom) Toby Martin (France) Mickael Kaouk
September 7	Pozzuoli, Italy; Hard; M25; Singles and doubles draws	(Cyprus) Melios Efstathiou; 6–2, 7–6^{(7–3)}	(Italy) Leonardo Rossi	(United Kingdom) Aidan McHugh (Italy) Filippo Moroni	(Germany) David Eichenseher (Greece) Dimitris Sakellaridis (Italy) Fabrizio Andaloro (Italy) Filippo Mazzola
September 7	Pozzuoli, Italy; Hard; M25; Singles and doubles draws	(United Kingdom) Emile Hudd (United Kingdom) Aidan McHugh; 6–3, 6–1	(Cyprus) Melios Efstathiou (Cyprus) Eleftherios Neos	(United Kingdom) Aidan McHugh (Italy) Filippo Moroni	(Germany) David Eichenseher (Greece) Dimitris Sakellaridis (Italy) Fabrizio Andaloro (Italy) Filippo Mazzola
September 7	Rabat, Morocco; Clay; M25; Singles and doubles draws	(Netherlands) Max Houkes; 6–2, 6–4	(Morocco) Walid Ahouda	(Greece) Ioannis Xilas (France) Pierre Delage	(Switzerland) Jeffrey von der Schulenburg (Belgium) Jack Logé (Italy) Iannis Miletich (Italy) Maximilian Figl
September 7	Rabat, Morocco; Clay; M25; Singles and doubles draws	(Portugal) Vasco Leote Prata (Portugal) Diogo Morais; 6–4, 6–4	(Morocco) Amine Jamji (Morocco) Younes Lalami	(Greece) Ioannis Xilas (France) Pierre Delage	(Switzerland) Jeffrey von der Schulenburg (Belgium) Jack Logé (Italy) Iannis Miletich (Italy) Maximilian Figl
September 7	Bali, Indonesia; Hard; M15; Singles and doubles draws	(India) Karan Singh; 7–6^{(7–5)}, 7–5	(United States) Alexander Chang	(Indonesia) Nathan Anthony Barki (India) Digvijaypratap Singh	(New Zealand) Isaac Becroft (Spain) Pablo Perez Ramos (Chinese Taipei) Chen Yan-cheng (Australia) Hayden Jones
September 7	Bali, Indonesia; Hard; M15; Singles and doubles draws	(United States) Alexander Chang (Spain) Pablo Perez Ramos; 3–6, 6–3, [12–10]	(New Zealand) Isaac Becroft (New Zealand) Reece Falck	(Indonesia) Nathan Anthony Barki (India) Digvijaypratap Singh	(New Zealand) Isaac Becroft (Spain) Pablo Perez Ramos (Chinese Taipei) Chen Yan-cheng (Australia) Hayden Jones
September 7	Nonthaburi, Thailand; Hard; M15; Singles and doubles draws	(Thailand) Thanapet Chanta; 6–3, 6–2	(Thailand) Markus Malaszszak	(France) Julien De Cuyper (Thailand) Pawit Sornlaksup	(India) Maan Kesharwani (Dominican Republic) Peter Bertran (Thailand) Thantub Suksumrarn (Japan) Shintaro Imai
September 7	Nonthaburi, Thailand; Hard; M15; Singles and doubles draws	(Japan) Tomohiro Masabayashi (Thailand) Thantub Suksumrarn; 6–3, 6–4	(Thailand) Thanapet Chanta (Thailand) Yuttana Charoenphon	(France) Julien De Cuyper (Thailand) Pawit Sornlaksup	(India) Maan Kesharwani (Dominican Republic) Peter Bertran (Thailand) Thantub Suksumrarn (Japan) Shintaro Imai
September 7	Wuning, China; Hard; M15; Singles and doubles draws	(Japan) Hiromasa Koyama; 6–1, 6–3	(China) Zhao Zhao	(South Korea) Kim Geun-jun (South Korea) Choe Jae-sung	(China) Zhang Boxiong (China) Jin Yuquan (Japan) Yuta Tomida (Thailand) Wishaya Trongcharoenchaikul
September 7	Wuning, China; Hard; M15; Singles and doubles draws	(China) Jin Yuquan (China) Sun Qian; 6–2, 6–4	(China) Dong Zhenxiong (China) Wang Yukun	(South Korea) Kim Geun-jun (South Korea) Choe Jae-sung	(China) Zhang Boxiong (China) Jin Yuquan (Japan) Yuta Tomida (Thailand) Wishaya Trongcharoenchaikul
September 7	Tsaghkadzor, Armenia; Clay; M15; Singles and doubles draws	(Kazakhstan) Dmitry Popko; 6–3, 6–4	(Argentina) Ignacio Monzón	(France) Corentin Denolly; Grigory Shebekin	(Germany) Niklas Guttau; Egor Pleshivtsev; Ruslan Tiukaev; Roman Kharlamov
September 7	Tsaghkadzor, Armenia; Clay; M15; Singles and doubles draws	Roman Kharlamov; Grigory Shebekin; 7–6^{(8–6)}, 6–4	(France) Corentin Denolly (Armenia) Daniil Sarksian	(France) Corentin Denolly; Grigory Shebekin	(Germany) Niklas Guttau; Egor Pleshivtsev; Ruslan Tiukaev; Roman Kharlamov
September 7	Budapest, Hungary; Clay; M15; Singles and doubles draws	(Hungary) Máté Valkusz; 6–1, 4–6, 7–5	(France) Lilian Marmousez	(Germany) John Sperle (Slovenia) Jan Kupčič	(Israel) Orel Kimhi (Italy) Gabriele Maria Noce (Brazil) Bruno Fernandez (Italy) Tobia Costanzo Baragiola
September 7	Budapest, Hungary; Clay; M15; Singles and doubles draws	(Hungary) Attila Balázs (Hungary) Vincent Selmeczi; 6–3, 6–4	(Brazil) Bruno Fernandez (Germany) John Sperle	(Germany) John Sperle (Slovenia) Jan Kupčič	(Israel) Orel Kimhi (Italy) Gabriele Maria Noce (Brazil) Bruno Fernandez (Italy) Tobia Costanzo Baragiola
September 7	Hurghada, Egypt; Hard; M15; Singles and doubles draws	(United Kingdom) Millen Hurrion; 6–3, 6–2	(India) Aradhya Kshitij	Sergey Petrov (Italy) Lorenzo Lorusso	(Germany) Aaron Funk (Slovakia) Michal Krajčí (Republic of Ireland) Conor Gannon (France) Charles Bertimon
September 7	Hurghada, Egypt; Hard; M15; Singles and doubles draws	(Italy) Gabriele Thomas Brancatelli (Italy) Lorenzo Lorusso; 6–4, 6–2	(India) Pranav Karthik (Kuwait) Essa Qabazard	Sergey Petrov (Italy) Lorenzo Lorusso	(Germany) Aaron Funk (Slovakia) Michal Krajčí (Republic of Ireland) Conor Gannon (France) Charles Bertimon
September 7	Monastir, Tunisia; Hard; M15; Singles and doubles draws	(France) César Bouchelaghem; 6–3, 6–1	(United Kingdom) Oscar Brown	(Iran) Kasra Rahmani (Syria) Hazem Naw	(United Kingdom) Roan Jones (Algeria) Mohamed Nazim Makhlouf (United Kingdom) Matthew Carroll (United States) Lucca Liu
September 7	Monastir, Tunisia; Hard; M15; Singles and doubles draws	(Syria) Taym Al Azmeh (Syria) Hazem Naw; 7–6^{(7–4)}, 6–4	(France) Maxence Bertimon (France) Leo Deflandre	(Iran) Kasra Rahmani (Syria) Hazem Naw	(United Kingdom) Roan Jones (Algeria) Mohamed Nazim Makhlouf (United Kingdom) Matthew Carroll (United States) Lucca Liu
September 7	Leme, Brazil; Clay; M15; Singles and doubles draws	(Brazil) Mateus Alves; 6–3, 6–2	(Brazil) Pedro Sakamoto	(Brazil) Rafael Tosetto (Brazil) Victor Pagotto	(Brazil) Eduardo Lage (Brazil) João Vítor Gonçalves Ceolin (Brazil) Gabriel Schenekenberg (Brazil) Nicolas Zanellato
September 7	Leme, Brazil; Clay; M15; Singles and doubles draws	(Brazil) Mateus Napoli da Silveira (Brazil) João Eduardo Schiessl; 4–6, 7–6^{(7–4)}, [10–4]	(Brazil) Rafael Tosetto (Brazil) Nicolas Zanellato	(Brazil) Rafael Tosetto (Brazil) Victor Pagotto	(Brazil) Eduardo Lage (Brazil) João Vítor Gonçalves Ceolin (Brazil) Gabriel Schenekenberg (Brazil) Nicolas Zanellato
September 14	Guiyang, China; Hard; M25; Singles and doubles draws	Alibek Kachmazov; 6–3, 6–4	(South Korea) Chung Yun-seong	(Australia) Chase Ferguson (Germany) Nikolai Barsukov	(Sweden) Leo Borg (China) Tang Sheng (Germany) Nino Ehrenschneider (France) Robin Catry
September 14	Guiyang, China; Hard; M25; Singles and doubles draws	(China) Chen Xianfeng (South Korea) Chung Yun-seong; 3–6, 6–3, [10–3]	(Germany) Nikolai Barsukov (Germany) Nino Ehrenschneider	(Australia) Chase Ferguson (Germany) Nikolai Barsukov	(Sweden) Leo Borg (China) Tang Sheng (Germany) Nino Ehrenschneider (France) Robin Catry
September 14	Sintra, Portugal; Hard; M25; Singles and doubles draws	(Switzerland) Patrick Schoen; 6–2, 6–2	(Italy) Fausto Tabacco	(Italy) Giorgio Tabacco (Portugal) Tiago Cação	(Spain) John Echeverría (United Kingdom) Lui Maxted (France) Robin Bertrand (Netherlands) Alec Deckers
September 14	Sintra, Portugal; Hard; M25; Singles and doubles draws	(Italy) Fabrizio Andaloro (Italy) Giulio Perego; 3–6, 7–5, [13–11]	(France) Benjamin Pietri (Mexico) Alan Sau Franco	(Italy) Giorgio Tabacco (Portugal) Tiago Cação	(Spain) John Echeverría (United Kingdom) Lui Maxted (France) Robin Bertrand (Netherlands) Alec Deckers
September 14	Nevers, France; Hard (i); M25; Singles and doubles draws	(United Kingdom) Aidan McHugh; 6–4, 6–4	(United States) Samir Banerjee	(Norway) Andreja Petrovic (France) Alexandre Reco	(France) Thomas Faurel (France) Loann Massard (Italy) Leonardo Rossi (France) Étienne Donnet
September 14	Nevers, France; Hard (i); M25; Singles and doubles draws	(France) Liam Branger (France) Hugo Car; 7–5, 7–6^{(7–2)}	(Poland) Piotr Pawlak (Finland) Iiro Vasa	(Norway) Andreja Petrovic (France) Alexandre Reco	(France) Thomas Faurel (France) Loann Massard (Italy) Leonardo Rossi (France) Étienne Donnet
September 14	Santa Margherita di Pula, Italy; Clay; M25; Singles and doubles draws	(Germany) Max Hans Rehberg; 6–0, 6–1	Andrey Chepelev	(Ukraine) Eric Vanshelboim (Italy) Andrea De Marchi	(Italy) Alexander Weis (Italy) Sebastiano Cocola (United States) Garrett Johns (Italy) Lorenzo Comino
September 14	Santa Margherita di Pula, Italy; Clay; M25; Singles and doubles draws	(Italy) Riccardo Perin (Italy) Lorenzo Rottoli; 6–0, 6–4	(Italy) Alessandro Mondazzi (Italy) Matteo Sciahbasi	(Ukraine) Eric Vanshelboim (Italy) Andrea De Marchi	(Italy) Alexander Weis (Italy) Sebastiano Cocola (United States) Garrett Johns (Italy) Lorenzo Comino
September 14	Zlatibor, Serbia; Clay; M25; Singles and doubles draws	(Germany) Marko Topo; 7–6^{(7–3)}, 7–5	(Serbia) Kristijan Juhas	(France) Alexandre Aubriot (North Macedonia) Oleg Prihodko	(Serbia) Stefan Popović (Bulgaria) George Lazarov (Romania) Sebastian Gima (Bulgaria) Adrian Andreev
September 14	Zlatibor, Serbia; Clay; M25; Singles and doubles draws	(France) Marko Maric (Serbia) Tadija Radovanović; 6–7^{(4–7)}, 7–6^{(7–4)}, [10–8]	(Bulgaria) Alex Ganchev (Bulgaria) Anthony Genov	(France) Alexandre Aubriot (North Macedonia) Oleg Prihodko	(Serbia) Stefan Popović (Bulgaria) George Lazarov (Romania) Sebastian Gima (Bulgaria) Adrian Andreev
September 14	Tsaghkadzor, Armenia; Clay; M15; Singles and doubles draws	(Kazakhstan) Dmitry Popko; 6–3, 6–2	Dmitry Bessonov	(Switzerland) Arthur Laborde (France) Florent Lagarrigue	Egor Pleshivtsev; Ruslan Tiukaev (Argentina) Ignacio Monzón (Belgium) Martin van der Meerschen
September 14	Tsaghkadzor, Armenia; Clay; M15; Singles and doubles draws	(Italy) Lorenzo Ferri (Italy) Matteo Vavassori; 2–6, 6–3, [10–1]	Egor Khotchenkov; Ruslan Tiukaev	(Switzerland) Arthur Laborde (France) Florent Lagarrigue	Egor Pleshivtsev; Ruslan Tiukaev (Argentina) Ignacio Monzón (Belgium) Martin van der Meerschen
September 14	Melilla, Spain; Clay; M15; Singles and doubles draws	(Italy) Daniele Rapagnetta; 6–3, 6–4	(Italy) Pietro Marino	(Spain) Alejandro Turriziani Álvarez (Spain) Carles Córdoba	(Bulgaria) Leonid Sheyngezikht (France) Antoni Fabre (Spain) Carles Rojas (Italy) Maximilian Figl
September 14	Melilla, Spain; Clay; M15; Singles and doubles draws	(United States) Matias Reyniak (Spain) Carles Rojas; 6–1, 6–1	(France) Victor Paganetti (Bulgaria) Leonid Sheyngezikht	(Spain) Alejandro Turriziani Álvarez (Spain) Carles Córdoba	(Bulgaria) Leonid Sheyngezikht (France) Antoni Fabre (Spain) Carles Rojas (Italy) Maximilian Figl
September 14	Hurghada, Egypt; Hard; M15; Singles and doubles draws	(United Kingdom) Paul Jubb; 6–1, 6–4	(France) Charles Bertimon	Saveliy Ivanov (United Kingdom) Millen Hurrion	(United Kingdom) Viktor Frydrych (Italy) Gabriele Thomas Brancatelli; Ivan Gretskiy (India) Chirag Duhan
September 14	Hurghada, Egypt; Hard; M15; Singles and doubles draws	(United States) Keshav Chopra (Turkey) S Mert Özdemir; 6–2, 6–3	Sergey Betov (India) Chirag Duhan	Saveliy Ivanov (United Kingdom) Millen Hurrion	(United Kingdom) Viktor Frydrych (Italy) Gabriele Thomas Brancatelli; Ivan Gretskiy (India) Chirag Duhan
September 14	Monastir, Tunisia; Hard; M15; Singles and doubles draws	(United States) Benjamin Willwerth; 6–1, 6–4	(Iran) Kasra Rahmani	(Italy) Jacopo Bilardo (United Kingdom) Ewen Lumsden	(France) Damien Salvestre (Italy) Samuel Vincent Ruggeri (Algeria) Mohamed Nazim Makhlouf (Turkey) Ergi Kırkın
September 14	Monastir, Tunisia; Hard; M15; Singles and doubles draws	(Italy) Jacopo Bilardo (Italy) Samuel Vincent Ruggeri; Walkover	(United Kingdom) James Connel (Republic of Ireland) Ammar Elamin	(Italy) Jacopo Bilardo (United Kingdom) Ewen Lumsden	(France) Damien Salvestre (Italy) Samuel Vincent Ruggeri (Algeria) Mohamed Nazim Makhlouf (Turkey) Ergi Kırkın
September 14	Belém, Brazil; Hard; M15; Singles and doubles draws	(Brazil) Paulo André Saraiva dos Santos; 6–4, 7–5	(Brazil) Nicolas Zanellato	(Brazil) Livas Eduardo de Carvalho Damazio (Colombia) Juan Sebastián Osorio	(Brazil) Gabriel Schenekenberg (Brazil) Victor Bini (Brazil) Lorenzo Sverzut Corsini (Brazil) Pedro Sakamoto
September 14	Belém, Brazil; Hard; M15; Singles and doubles draws	(Brazil) Victor Braga (Argentina) Manuel Mouilleron Salvo; 6–3, 6–4	(Brazil) Breno Braga (Brazil) Rafael Tosetto	(Brazil) Livas Eduardo de Carvalho Damazio (Colombia) Juan Sebastián Osorio	(Brazil) Gabriel Schenekenberg (Brazil) Victor Bini (Brazil) Lorenzo Sverzut Corsini (Brazil) Pedro Sakamoto
September 21	Yinchuan, China; Hard; M25; Singles and doubles draws	Alibek Kachmazov; 6–3, 6–4	(Chinese Taipei) Chen Kuan-shou	(India) Mukund Sasikumar (Italy) Alexander Binda	(China) Tang Sheng (South Korea) Oh Chan-yeong (Poland) Filip Peliwo (Costa Rica) Jesse Flores
September 21	Yinchuan, China; Hard; M25; Singles and doubles draws	(Germany) Nikolai Barsukov (Germany) Nino Ehrenschneider; 6–7^{(15–17)}, 6–4, [10–8]	Alibek Kachmazov (Czech Republic) Dominik Palán	(India) Mukund Sasikumar (Italy) Alexander Binda	(China) Tang Sheng (South Korea) Oh Chan-yeong (Poland) Filip Peliwo (Costa Rica) Jesse Flores
September 21	Setúbal, Portugal; Hard; M25; Singles and doubles draws	(Netherlands) Alec Deckers; 5–7, 6–4, 6–3	(Spain) Iñaki Montes de la Torre	(Republic of Ireland) Michael Agwi (South Africa) Philip Henning	(United Kingdom) Lui Maxted (United Kingdom) Finn Murgett (Portugal) Diogo Morais (France) Robin Bertrand
September 21	Setúbal, Portugal; Hard; M25; Singles and doubles draws	(United Kingdom) Finn Murgett (United States) Tyler Stice; Walkover	(Spain) Alberto Barroso Campos (Spain) Rafael Izquierdo Luque	(Republic of Ireland) Michael Agwi (South Africa) Philip Henning	(United Kingdom) Lui Maxted (United Kingdom) Finn Murgett (Portugal) Diogo Morais (France) Robin Bertrand
September 21	Sabadell, Spain; Clay; M25; Singles and doubles draws	(South Korea) Gerard Campaña Lee; 6–3, 6–2	(Netherlands) Sander Jong	Ivan Gakhov (France) Lilian Marmousez	(Italy) Lorenzo Giustino (Venezuela) Ignacio Parisca (Slovenia) Luka Talan Lopatić (Greece) Ioannis Xilas
September 21	Sabadell, Spain; Clay; M25; Singles and doubles draws	(Spain) Alejandro García Carbajal (Spain) Pedro Vives Marcos; 6–3, 6–4	(Spain) Valentín González-Galiño (Argentina) Julio César Porras	Ivan Gakhov (France) Lilian Marmousez	(Italy) Lorenzo Giustino (Venezuela) Ignacio Parisca (Slovenia) Luka Talan Lopatić (Greece) Ioannis Xilas
September 21	Santa Margherita di Pula, Italy; Clay; M25; Singles and doubles draws	(Poland) Daniel Michalski; 7–6^{(7–5)}, 6–2	(France) Laurent Lokoli	(Ukraine) Eric Vanshelboim (Italy) Daniele Rapagnetta	(Italy) Lorenzo Carboni (Italy) Gianmarco Ferrari (Italy) Matteo Sciahbasi (Italy) Andrea De Marchi
September 21	Santa Margherita di Pula, Italy; Clay; M25; Singles and doubles draws	(Italy) Lorenzo Angelini (Italy) Lorenzo Carboni; 6–2, 6–3	(Italy) Niccolò Catini (Italy) Gabriele Crivellaro	(Ukraine) Eric Vanshelboim (Italy) Daniele Rapagnetta	(Italy) Lorenzo Carboni (Italy) Gianmarco Ferrari (Italy) Matteo Sciahbasi (Italy) Andrea De Marchi
September 21	Pardubice, Czech Republic; Clay; M25; Singles and doubles draws	(Slovenia) Sebastian Dominko; 6–4, 6–3	(Czech Republic) Štěpán Baum	(Slovakia) Lukáš Pokorný (Czech Republic) Jiří Čížek	(Czech Republic) Dominik Reček (Czech Republic) Matyáš Černý (Germany) Claus Piening (Germany) Rudolf Molleker
September 21	Pardubice, Czech Republic; Clay; M25; Singles and doubles draws	(Slovakia) Lukáš Pokorný (Greece) Petros Tsitsipas; 6–3, 7–6^{(7–5)}	(Czech Republic) Štěpán Baum (Czech Republic) Matyáš Černý	(Slovakia) Lukáš Pokorný (Czech Republic) Jiří Čížek	(Czech Republic) Dominik Reček (Czech Republic) Matyáš Černý (Germany) Claus Piening (Germany) Rudolf Molleker
September 21	Falun, Sweden; Hard (i); M25; Singles and doubles draws	(Switzerland) Henry Bernet; 7–6^{(7–3)}, 6–4	(United States) Samir Banerjee	(Finland) Eero Vasa (Norway) Andreja Petrovic	(Poland) Wojciech Marek (Denmark) Oskar Brostrøm Poulsen (Sweden) Karl Friberg (Sweden) Lucas Renard
September 21	Falun, Sweden; Hard (i); M25; Singles and doubles draws	(Denmark) Oskar Brostrøm Poulsen (Sweden) Nikola Slavic; 2–6, 7–6^{(8–6)}, [14–12]	(Finland) Eero Vasa (Finland) Iiro Vasa	(Finland) Eero Vasa (Norway) Andreja Petrovic	(Poland) Wojciech Marek (Denmark) Oskar Brostrøm Poulsen (Sweden) Karl Friberg (Sweden) Lucas Renard
September 21	Sharm El Sheikh, Egypt; Hard; M25; Singles and doubles draws	(Latvia) Robert Strombachs; 3–6, 7–6^{(7–5)}, 6–4	(India) Karan Singh	(Serbia) Branko Đurić (United Kingdom) Paul Jubb	(Egypt) Fares Zakaria (India) Chirag Duhan (Belgium) Romain Faucon (Italy) Pietro Fellin
September 21	Sharm El Sheikh, Egypt; Hard; M25; Singles and doubles draws	(Belgium) Romain Faucon (United States) Leonardo Vega; 3–6, 7–5, [11–9]	(Algeria) Samir Hamza Reguig (Tunisia) Aziz Ouakaa	(Serbia) Branko Đurić (United Kingdom) Paul Jubb	(Egypt) Fares Zakaria (India) Chirag Duhan (Belgium) Romain Faucon (Italy) Pietro Fellin
September 21	Baku, Azerbaijan; Hard; M15; Singles and doubles draws	(Sweden) Arvid Nordquist; 7–6^{(7–5)}, 7–6^{(7–5)}	(India) Digvijaypratap Singh	(United Kingdom) Oscar Brown; Dmitry Dolzhenkov	(Turkey) Koray Kırcı (Poland) Karol Filar (Germany) Marc Majdandzic (United Kingdom) Millen Hurrion
September 21	Baku, Azerbaijan; Hard; M15; Singles and doubles draws	Egor Agafonov; Dmitry Dolzhenkov; 6–0, 6–2	Oleg Kolninov; Pavel Savelov	(United Kingdom) Oscar Brown; Dmitry Dolzhenkov	(Turkey) Koray Kırcı (Poland) Karol Filar (Germany) Marc Majdandzic (United Kingdom) Millen Hurrion
September 21	Telavi, Georgia; Clay; M15; Singles and doubles draws	(Kazakhstan) Dmitry Popko; 6–0, 6–1	(Italy) Michele Mecarelli	(Sweden) Dragoș Nicolae Mădăraș (Italy) Francesco Ferrari	(Italy) Filiberto Fumagalli (Italy) Edoardo Cherie Ligniere (Netherlands) Stijn Paardekooper (Argentina) Ignacio Monzón
September 21	Telavi, Georgia; Clay; M15; Singles and doubles draws	Timofei Derepasko (Netherlands) Stijn Paardekooper; 6–2, 3–0 ret.	(Italy) Filiberto Fumagalli (United Kingdom) Jeremy Gschwendtner	(Sweden) Dragoș Nicolae Mădăraș (Italy) Francesco Ferrari	(Italy) Filiberto Fumagalli (Italy) Edoardo Cherie Ligniere (Netherlands) Stijn Paardekooper (Argentina) Ignacio Monzón
September 21	Forbach, France; Carpet (i); M15; Singles and doubles draws	(Switzerland) Flynn Thomas; 3–6, 6–3, 6–2	(Germany) Stefan Seifert	(France) Arthur Nagel (France) Noah Boutleux	(France) Timéo Trufelli (France) Theo Herrmann (Germany) Christian Djonov (Netherlands) Daniel de Jonge
September 21	Forbach, France; Carpet (i); M15; Singles and doubles draws	(France) Axel Garcian (France) Arthur Nagel; 7–6^{(9–7)}, 6–3	(Germany) Moritz Hoffmann (France) Paul Theate	(France) Arthur Nagel (France) Noah Boutleux	(France) Timéo Trufelli (France) Theo Herrmann (Germany) Christian Djonov (Netherlands) Daniel de Jonge
September 21	Monastir, Tunisia; Hard; M15; Singles and doubles draws	(France) Étienne Donnet; 7–6^{(7–3)}, 4–6, 6–4	(France) Paul Colin	(Italy) Samuel Vincent Ruggeri (United Kingdom) Toby Martin	(France) Liam Branger (Italy) Andrea Colombo (Angola) Daniel Domingos (United Kingdom) Ewen Lumsden
September 21	Monastir, Tunisia; Hard; M15; Singles and doubles draws	(France) Sven Corbinais (Hungary) Péter Makk; 3–6, 7–5, [10–8]	(United Kingdom) Billy Blaydes (United Kingdom) William Nolan	(Italy) Samuel Vincent Ruggeri (United Kingdom) Toby Martin	(France) Liam Branger (Italy) Andrea Colombo (Angola) Daniel Domingos (United Kingdom) Ewen Lumsden
September 21	Columbia, United States; Hard; M15; Singles and doubles draws	(United Kingdom) Oliver Bonding; 6–2, 3–6, 6–3	(United States) Sean Daryabeigi	(United States) Gabe Avram (United Kingdom) William Jansen	(United Kingdom) Charlie Swaine (France) Antonin Witz (United States) Evan Bynoe (Spain) Tito Chávez
September 21	Columbia, United States; Hard; M15; Singles and doubles draws	(United States) Dakotah Bobo (United States) Nathan Cox; 6–3, 6–1	(Senegal) Seydina André (Brazil) Luís Felipe Miguel	(United States) Gabe Avram (United Kingdom) William Jansen	(United Kingdom) Charlie Swaine (France) Antonin Witz (United States) Evan Bynoe (Spain) Tito Chávez
September 21	Curitiba, Brazil; Clay; M15; Singles and doubles draws	(Brazil) Mateus Alves; 6–4, 6–2	(Brazil) Pedro Sakamoto	(Brazil) Wilson Leite (Brazil) Nicolas Zanellato	(Brazil) João Victor Couto Loureiro (Brazil) José Pereira (Brazil) João Eduardo Schiessl (Colombia) Juan Sebastián Osorio
September 21	Curitiba, Brazil; Clay; M15; Singles and doubles draws	(Brazil) Rafael Tosetto (Brazil) Nicolas Zanellato; 6–4, 6–3	(The Bahamas) Justin Roberts (Brazil) Gabriel Roveri Sidney	(Brazil) Wilson Leite (Brazil) Nicolas Zanellato	(Brazil) João Victor Couto Loureiro (Brazil) José Pereira (Brazil) João Eduardo Schiessl (Colombia) Juan Sebastián Osorio
September 28	Darwin, Australia; Hard; M25; Singles and doubles draws	(Australia) Casey Hoole; 7–6^{(7–5)}, 7–5	(Australia) Hayden Jones	(Norway) Herman Hoeyeraal (Australia) Derek Pham	(Australia) Philip Sekulic (Northern Mariana Islands) Colin Sinclair (Australia) Scott Jones (Australia) Jake Delaney
September 28	Darwin, Australia; Hard; M25; Singles and doubles draws	(Norway) Herman Hoeyeraal (Australia) Eric Padgham; 6–7^{(6–8)}, 7–6^{(9–7)}, [10–2]	(Australia) Jeremy Beale (Australia) Stefan Vujic	(Norway) Herman Hoeyeraal (Australia) Derek Pham	(Australia) Philip Sekulic (Northern Mariana Islands) Colin Sinclair (Australia) Scott Jones (Australia) Jake Delaney
September 28	Zaragoza, Spain; Clay; M25; Singles and doubles draws	(Switzerland) Alexander Ritschard; 6–3, 6–2	(Spain) Alejandro Moro Cañas	(Netherlands) Sander Jong (Netherlands) Ryan Nijboer	(Spain) Pedro Vives Marcos (Italy) Lorenzo Carboni (Belgium) Nicolas Ifi (Spain) Miguel Damas
September 28	Zaragoza, Spain; Clay; M25; Singles and doubles draws	(Belgium) Nicolas Ifi (Germany) Cedric Stanke; 2–6, 7–6^{(8–6)}, [10–8]	(Spain) Ivan López Martos (Spain) Xavi Palomar	(Netherlands) Sander Jong (Netherlands) Ryan Nijboer	(Spain) Pedro Vives Marcos (Italy) Lorenzo Carboni (Belgium) Nicolas Ifi (Spain) Miguel Damas
September 28	Slobozia, Romania; Clay; M25; Singles and doubles draws	(Romania) Sebastian Gima; 6–3, 6–4	(Romania) Adrian Boitan	(Romania) Radu David Țurcanu (Poland) Borys Zgoła	(Romania) Filip Cristian Jianu (Germany) Jannik Opitz (Germany) Florian Broska (Romania) Radu Mihai Papoe
September 28	Slobozia, Romania; Clay; M25; Singles and doubles draws	(Germany) Jannik Opitz (Germany) Louis Wessels; 6–3, 6–1	(Romania) Ștefan Adrian Andreescu (Romania) Gheorghe Claudiu Schinteie	(Romania) Radu David Țurcanu (Poland) Borys Zgoła	(Romania) Filip Cristian Jianu (Germany) Jannik Opitz (Germany) Florian Broska (Romania) Radu Mihai Papoe
September 28	Kigali, Rwanda; Clay; M25; Singles and doubles draws	(France) Calvin Hemery; 6–3, 6–3	(Zimbabwe) Benjamin Lock	(Netherlands) Max Houkes (France) Florent Bax	(South Africa) Alec Beckley (Italy) Manuel Plunger (India) Dev Javia (Israel) Yshai Oliel
September 28	Kigali, Rwanda; Clay; M25; Singles and doubles draws	(United States) Axel Nefve (United States) Noah Schachter; 6–2, 6–3	(Burundi) Allan Gatoto (Kenya) Kael Shalin Shah	(Netherlands) Max Houkes (France) Florent Bax	(South Africa) Alec Beckley (Italy) Manuel Plunger (India) Dev Javia (Israel) Yshai Oliel
September 28	Lu'an, China; Hard; M15; Singles and doubles draws	(Germany) Nino Ehrenschneider; 6–3, 3–6, 6–3	(New Zealand) Isaac Becroft	(Japan) Ryuki Matsuda (Australia) Max Purcell	(Japan) Taisei Ichikawa (Japan) Kosuke Ogura (Japan) Taiyo Yamanaka (Chinese Taipei) Wang Kai-i
September 28	Lu'an, China; Hard; M15; Singles and doubles draws	(Chinese Taipei) Lin Nan-hsun (China) Yang Zijiang; 1–6, 7–5, [11–9]	(Japan) Taisei Ichikawa (South Korea) Jeong Yeong-seok	(Japan) Ryuki Matsuda (Australia) Max Purcell	(Japan) Taisei Ichikawa (Japan) Kosuke Ogura (Japan) Taiyo Yamanaka (Chinese Taipei) Wang Kai-i
September 28	Baku, Azerbaijan; Hard; M15; Singles and doubles draws	(India) Digvijaypratap Singh; 6–4, 6–4	(United Kingdom) Millen Hurrion	(Turkey) Kerem Yılmaz (United Kingdom) Marcus Walters	(France) Louis Larue (Ukraine) Volodymyr Iakubenko (United Kingdom) James Connel (Turkey) Arda Azkara
September 28	Baku, Azerbaijan; Hard; M15; Singles and doubles draws	(United Kingdom) James Connel (United Kingdom) Marcus Walters; 6–4, 6–2	(Malta) Liam Delicata (Greece) Ioannis Stamatopoulos	(Turkey) Kerem Yılmaz (United Kingdom) Marcus Walters	(France) Louis Larue (Ukraine) Volodymyr Iakubenko (United Kingdom) James Connel (Turkey) Arda Azkara
September 28	Telavi, Georgia; Clay; M15; Singles and doubles draws	(Netherlands) Stijn Paardekooper; 6–4, 6–3	(Kazakhstan) Dmitry Popko	(Sweden) Dragoș Nicolae Mădăraș (Slovenia) Matic Dimic	(Italy) Michele Mecarelli (Italy) Gabriele Bosio (Italy) Nicola Rispoli (Belgium) Alessio Basile
September 28	Telavi, Georgia; Clay; M15; Singles and doubles draws	(Italy) Mattia Nannelli; Bogdan Seleznev; 6–3, 4–6, [11–9]	Kirill Mishkin; Vitali Shvets	(Sweden) Dragoș Nicolae Mădăraș (Slovenia) Matic Dimic	(Italy) Michele Mecarelli (Italy) Gabriele Bosio (Italy) Nicola Rispoli (Belgium) Alessio Basile
September 28	Šibenik, Croatia; Clay; M15; Singles and doubles draws	(Ukraine) Nikita Mashtakov; 6–0, 6–4	(Switzerland) Noah Lopez	(France) Charles Bertimon (Belgium) Martin van der Meerschen	(Switzerland) Jeffrey von der Schulenburg (Czech Republic) Jakub Nicod (Germany) Filip Krolo (Slovenia) Mak Mikovič
September 28	Šibenik, Croatia; Clay; M15; Singles and doubles draws	(Bosnia and Herzegovina) Ivan Biletić (Croatia) Karlo Kajin; 6–3, 6–3	(Slovenia) Aljaž Jeran (Slovenia) Jan Kupčič	(France) Charles Bertimon (Belgium) Martin van der Meerschen	(Switzerland) Jeffrey von der Schulenburg (Czech Republic) Jakub Nicod (Germany) Filip Krolo (Slovenia) Mak Mikovič
September 28	Sharm El Sheikh, Egypt; Hard; M15; Singles and doubles draws	(United Kingdom) Paul Jubb; 2–6, 6–4, 6–3	(Egypt) Fares Zakaria	(Latvia) Robert Strombachs (India) Karan Singh	(Slovakia) Michal Krajčí (Egypt) Amr Elsayed (Belgium) Romain Faucon; Anton Arzhankin
September 28	Sharm El Sheikh, Egypt; Hard; M15; Singles and doubles draws	(Italy) Lorenzo Lorusso (Switzerland) Nicola Senn; 6–4, 6–4	Anton Arzhankin; Andrei Kunitsyn	(Latvia) Robert Strombachs (India) Karan Singh	(Slovakia) Michal Krajčí (Egypt) Amr Elsayed (Belgium) Romain Faucon; Anton Arzhankin
September 28	Monastir, Tunisia; Hard; M15; Singles and doubles draws	(Turkey) Tuncay Duran; 6–0, 1–6, 6–3	(South Africa) Kris van Wyk	(Belgium) Lars Goran Verwerft (Belgium) Émilien Demanet	(France) Liam Branger (Spain) Carles Hernández (Tunisia) Aziz Ouakaa (Belgium) Jack Logé
September 28	Monastir, Tunisia; Hard; M15; Singles and doubles draws	(Tunisia) Adam Nagoudi (Monaco) Rocco Piatti; 6–4, 7–6^{(9–7)}	(France) Liam Branger (France) Remy Dugardin	(Belgium) Lars Goran Verwerft (Belgium) Émilien Demanet	(France) Liam Branger (Spain) Carles Hernández (Tunisia) Aziz Ouakaa (Belgium) Jack Logé
September 28	Ann Arbor, United States; Hard; M15; Singles and doubles draws	(Sweden) Max Dahlin; 6–4, 6–4	(United Kingdom) Oliver Bonding	(Japan) Naoto Tomizawa (United Kingdom) Hugo Coquelin	(Sweden) John Hallquist Lithen (Kazakhstan) Damir Zhalgasbay (Poland) Olaf Pieczkowski (Switzerland) Nikola Djosic
September 28	Ann Arbor, United States; Hard; M15; Singles and doubles draws	(United States) Max Sheldon (United States) Bjorn Swenson; 4–6, 6–1, [10–3]	(United States) Jeffrey Fradkin (United States) Matt Kuhar	(Japan) Naoto Tomizawa (United Kingdom) Hugo Coquelin	(Sweden) John Hallquist Lithen (Kazakhstan) Damir Zhalgasbay (Poland) Olaf Pieczkowski (Switzerland) Nikola Djosic
September 28	Fayetteville, United States; Hard; M15; Singles and doubles draws	(United States) Dominick Mosejczuk; 6–3, 6–3	(France) Théo Papamalamis	(Canada) Alexander Rozin (United States) Jonah Braswell	(India) Aryan Shah (South Korea) Roh Ho-young (Colombia) Johan Alexander Rodríguez (Canada) Alvin Nicholas Tudorica
September 28	Fayetteville, United States; Hard; M15; Singles and doubles draws	(United States) Jerry Roddick (Turkey) Togan Tokaç; 7–5, 6–3	(Colombia) Alejandro Arcila (Canada) Alexander Rozin	(Canada) Alexander Rozin (United States) Jonah Braswell	(India) Aryan Shah (South Korea) Roh Ho-young (Colombia) Johan Alexander Rodríguez (Canada) Alvin Nicholas Tudorica
