= 2026 ITF Men's World Tennis Tour (January–March) =

The 2026 ITF Men's World Tennis Tour is the 2026 edition of the second-tier tour for men's professional tennis. It is organised by the International Tennis Federation and is a tier below the ATP Challenger Tour. The ITF Men's World Tennis Tour includes tournaments with prize money ranging from $15,000 to $25,000.

Since 2022, following the Russian invasion of Ukraine the ITF announced that players from Belarus and Russia could still play on the tour but would not be allowed to play under the flag of Belarus or Russia.

== Key ==
M25 tournaments
M15 tournaments

== Month ==
=== January ===
Week of	Tournament	Winner	Runners-up	Semifinalists	Quarterfinalists
January 5	Hazebrouck, France; Hard (i); M25; Singles and doubles draws	(France) Moïse Kouamé; 7–6^{(7–5)}, 6–1	(France) Théo Papamalamis	(France) Cyril Vandermeersch (France) Lucas Poullain	(Belgium) Pierre-Yves Bailly (France) Robin Catry (France) Arthur Nagel (France) Cosme Rolland de Ravel
January 5	Hazebrouck, France; Hard (i); M25; Singles and doubles draws	(Republic of Ireland) Charles Barry (Germany) Niklas Schell; 3–6, 7–6^{(7–5)}, [10–2]	(France) Maxence Bertimon; Mikalai Haliak	(France) Cyril Vandermeersch (France) Lucas Poullain	(Belgium) Pierre-Yves Bailly (France) Robin Catry (France) Arthur Nagel (France) Cosme Rolland de Ravel
January 5	Antalya, Turkiye; Clay; M25; Singles and doubles draws	(United Kingdom) Felix Gill; 6–2, 1–6, 6–2	(Romania) Filip Cristian Jianu	(Germany) Rudolf Molleker (Serbia) Dušan Obradović	(Italy) Federico Bondioli; Evgenii Tiurnev (Italy) Raúl Brancaccio (Spain) Carlos Sánchez Jover
January 5	Antalya, Turkiye; Clay; M25; Singles and doubles draws	(Italy) Federico Bondioli (Italy) Raúl Brancaccio; 6–3, 5–7, [10–7]	(Bulgaria) Yanaki Milev (Serbia) Stefan Popović	(Germany) Rudolf Molleker (Serbia) Dušan Obradović	(Italy) Federico Bondioli; Evgenii Tiurnev (Italy) Raúl Brancaccio (Spain) Carlos Sánchez Jover
January 5	Monastir, Tunisia; Hard; M25; Singles and doubles draws	(Germany) Florian Broska; 4–6, 6–1, 6–1	(Sweden) Olle Wallin	(Sweden) John Hallquist Lithen (Turkey) Mert Alkaya	(Tunisia) Alaa Trifi (Slovakia) Lukáš Pokorný (Italy) Stefano D'Agostino (Turkey) Ergi Kırkın
January 5	Monastir, Tunisia; Hard; M25; Singles and doubles draws	(United States) Garrett Johns (Slovakia) Lukáš Pokorný; 6–7^{(6–8)}, 6–2, [12–10]	(Turkey) Mert Alkaya (Sweden) Oliver Johansson	(Sweden) John Hallquist Lithen (Turkey) Mert Alkaya	(Tunisia) Alaa Trifi (Slovakia) Lukáš Pokorný (Italy) Stefano D'Agostino (Turkey) Ergi Kırkın
January 5	Winston-Salem, United States; Hard (i); M25; Singles and doubles draws	(United States) Keegan Smith; 7–6^{(7–5)}, 6–7^{(4–7)}, 6–3	(Japan) Shunsuke Mitsui	(United States) Jack Kennedy (United Kingdom) Luca Pow	(Japan) Jay Dylan Friend (United States) Stefan Dostanic (United States) Daniel Milavsky (Slovenia) Bor Artnak
January 5	Winston-Salem, United States; Hard (i); M25; Singles and doubles draws	(United States) Daniel Milavsky (United States) Braden Shick; 6–4, 7–6^{(7–3)}	(United States) Ryan Colby (United States) Noah Zamora	(United States) Jack Kennedy (United Kingdom) Luca Pow	(Japan) Jay Dylan Friend (United States) Stefan Dostanic (United States) Daniel Milavsky (Slovenia) Bor Artnak
January 5	Manacor, Spain; Hard; M15; Singles and doubles draws	Yaroslav Demin; 6–2, 6–0	(Bulgaria) Ivan Ivanov	Pavel Lagutin (Spain) Imanol López Morillo	(Spain) Julian Alonso (Kazakhstan) Amir Omarkhanov (Croatia) Josip Šimundža (Australia) Duje Markovina
January 5	Manacor, Spain; Hard; M15; Singles and doubles draws	(Germany) Sebastian Fanselow (Germany) Liam Gavrielides; 7–6^{(9–7)}, 6–1	(Spain) Ivan López Martos (Spain) Imanol López Morillo	Pavel Lagutin (Spain) Imanol López Morillo	(Spain) Julian Alonso (Kazakhstan) Amir Omarkhanov (Croatia) Josip Šimundža (Australia) Duje Markovina
January 5	Oslo, Norway; Hard (i); M15; Singles and doubles draws	(Germany) Max Hans Rehberg; 6–2, 4–6, 6–3	(Luxembourg) Alex Knaff	(Denmark) Oskar Brostrøm Poulsen (Sweden) Karl Friberg	(Finland) Linus Lagerbohm (Sweden) Nikola Slavic (France) Matt Ponchet (Norway) Andreja Petrovic
January 5	Oslo, Norway; Hard (i); M15; Singles and doubles draws	(Denmark) Oskar Brostrøm Poulsen (Sweden) Nikola Slavic; 6–1, 6–4	(Netherlands) Daniel de Jonge (United States) Billy Suarez	(Denmark) Oskar Brostrøm Poulsen (Sweden) Karl Friberg	(Finland) Linus Lagerbohm (Sweden) Nikola Slavic (France) Matt Ponchet (Norway) Andreja Petrovic
January 5	Hurghada, Egypt; Hard; M15; Singles and doubles draws	(Serbia) Marko Miladinović; 7–5, 7–5	(Switzerland) Nikola Djosic	(Georgia (country)) Aleksandre Bakshi (Georgia (country)) Zura Tkemaladze	(France) Benjamin Pietri; Daniil Ostapenkov (United States) Maxwell McKennon (Austria) Maximilian Neuchrist
January 5	Hurghada, Egypt; Hard; M15; Singles and doubles draws	(Turkey) S Mert Özdemir (Turkey) Mert Naci Türker; 3–6, 7–6^{(10–8)}, [10–4]	Egor Gerasimov; Daniil Ostapenkov	(Georgia (country)) Aleksandre Bakshi (Georgia (country)) Zura Tkemaladze	(France) Benjamin Pietri; Daniil Ostapenkov (United States) Maxwell McKennon (Austria) Maximilian Neuchrist
January 12	Chennai, India; Hard; M25; Singles and doubles draws	(Netherlands) Max Houkes; 6–3, 6–7^{(5–7)}, 6–3	(Netherlands) Niels Visker	(Czech Republic) Jonáš Forejtek; Ilia Simakin	(India) S D Prajwal Dev (Tunisia) Aziz Ouakaa (India) Sidharth Rawat (Czech Republic) Dominik Palán
January 12	Chennai, India; Hard; M25; Singles and doubles draws	(India) Jeevan Nedunchezhiyan (India) Ramkumar Ramanathan; 4–6, 6–3, [10–8]	(India) S D Prajwal Dev (India) Nitin Kumar Sinha	(Czech Republic) Jonáš Forejtek; Ilia Simakin	(India) S D Prajwal Dev (Tunisia) Aziz Ouakaa (India) Sidharth Rawat (Czech Republic) Dominik Palán
January 12	Antalya, Turkiye; Clay; M25; Singles and doubles draws	(Romania) Filip Cristian Jianu; 6–1, 6–1	(Serbia) Dušan Obradović	(Spain) Carlos Sánchez Jover (Spain) Àlex Martí Pujolràs	(Japan) Makoto Ochi (Ukraine) Oleksii Krutykh (Hungary) Máté Valkusz (Bulgaria) Yanaki Milev
January 12	Antalya, Turkiye; Clay; M25; Singles and doubles draws	(Romania) Gabriel Ghețu (Romania) Radu David Țurcanu; 6–4, 6–1	(Romania) Alexandru Cristian Dumitru (Cyprus) Eleftherios Neos	(Spain) Carlos Sánchez Jover (Spain) Àlex Martí Pujolràs	(Japan) Makoto Ochi (Ukraine) Oleksii Krutykh (Hungary) Máté Valkusz (Bulgaria) Yanaki Milev
January 12	Monastir, Tunisia; Hard; M25; Singles and doubles draws	(Slovakia) Lukáš Pokorný; 6–3, 6–4	(Germany) Florian Broska	(Japan) Keisuke Saitoh (Turkey) Mert Alkaya	(United States) Garrett Johns (Greece) Dimitris Sakellaridis (France) Alexandre Aubriot (France) Thomas Faurel
January 12	Monastir, Tunisia; Hard; M25; Singles and doubles draws	(Luxembourg) Louis Van Herck (Germany) Marlon Vankan; 6–4, 5–7, [10–6]	Egor Agafonov (Slovakia) Lukáš Pokorný	(Japan) Keisuke Saitoh (Turkey) Mert Alkaya	(United States) Garrett Johns (Greece) Dimitris Sakellaridis (France) Alexandre Aubriot (France) Thomas Faurel
January 12	Winston-Salem, United States; Hard (i); M25; Singles and doubles draws	(United States) Braden Shick; 4–6, 6–1, 6–4	(United States) Quinn Vandecasteele	(United States) William Grant (United States) Keegan Smith	(United States) Karl Poling (Netherlands) Mees Röttgering (United States) Stefan Dostanic (United States) Alexander Kotzen
January 12	Winston-Salem, United States; Hard (i); M25; Singles and doubles draws	(United States) Daniel Milavsky (United States) Braden Shick; 6–4, 6–3	(United States) Dominick Mosejczuk (Poland) Kacper Szymkowiak	(United States) William Grant (United States) Keegan Smith	(United States) Karl Poling (Netherlands) Mees Röttgering (United States) Stefan Dostanic (United States) Alexander Kotzen
January 12	Santiago, Chile; Clay; M25; Singles and doubles draws	(Argentina) Facundo Mena; 6–4, 6–4	(Chile) Matías Soto	(United States) Kaylan Bigun (France) Sean Cuenin	(Mexico) Alan Fernando Rubio Fierros (Brazil) Paulo André Saraiva dos Santos (Poland) Marcel Zieliński (Chile) Benjamín Torrealba
January 12	Santiago, Chile; Clay; M25; Singles and doubles draws	(Chile) Ignacio António Becerra Otarola (Chile) Amador Salazar; 1–6, 6–3, [10–8]	(Brazil) Gabriel Roveri Sidney (Brazil) Paulo André Saraiva dos Santos	(United States) Kaylan Bigun (France) Sean Cuenin	(Mexico) Alan Fernando Rubio Fierros (Brazil) Paulo André Saraiva dos Santos (Poland) Marcel Zieliński (Chile) Benjamín Torrealba
January 12	Manacor, Spain; Hard; M15; Singles and doubles draws	(United Kingdom) Max Basing; 2–6, 6–4, 6–3	(Belgium) Jack Logé	(Spain) Sergio Callejón Hernando; Egor Pleshivtsev	(Cyprus) Melios Efstathiou (Spain) Imanol López Morillo (Germany) Liam Gavrielides (United States) Gavin Young
January 12	Manacor, Spain; Hard; M15; Singles and doubles draws	Yaroslav Demin (Spain) Daniel Rincón; 6–3, 6–3	(Republic of Ireland) Conor Gannon (United Kingdom) Joe Leather	(Spain) Sergio Callejón Hernando; Egor Pleshivtsev	(Cyprus) Melios Efstathiou (Spain) Imanol López Morillo (Germany) Liam Gavrielides (United States) Gavin Young
January 12	Bressuire, France; Hard (i); M15; Singles and doubles draws	(France) Moïse Kouamé; 6–1, 6–4	(Belgium) Pierre-Yves Bailly	(United States) Cannon Kingsley; Mikalai Haliak	(France) Adrien Gobat (France) Amaury Raynel (France) Kenny de Schepper (France) Robin Catry
January 12	Bressuire, France; Hard (i); M15; Singles and doubles draws	(United Kingdom) Finn Murgett (France) Arthur Nagel; 6–4, 7–5	(France) Maxence Beauge (France) Yanis Ghazouani Durand	(United States) Cannon Kingsley; Mikalai Haliak	(France) Adrien Gobat (France) Amaury Raynel (France) Kenny de Schepper (France) Robin Catry
January 12	Cadolzburg, Germany; Carpet (i); M15; Singles and doubles draws	(Netherlands) Daniel de Jonge; 7–6^{(7–5)}, 6–3	(Germany) Sydney Zick	(Poland) Karol Filar (Denmark) Oskar Brostrøm Poulsen	(Germany) Vincent Reisach (Sweden) Nikola Slavic (France) Loann Massard (Germany) Max Schönhaus
January 12	Cadolzburg, Germany; Carpet (i); M15; Singles and doubles draws	(Latvia) Kārlis Ozoliņš (Poland) Piotr Pawlak; 2–6, 7–6^{(8–6)}, [11–9]	(Netherlands) Daniel de Jonge (United States) Billy Suarez	(Poland) Karol Filar (Denmark) Oskar Brostrøm Poulsen	(Germany) Vincent Reisach (Sweden) Nikola Slavic (France) Loann Massard (Germany) Max Schönhaus
January 12	Hurghada, Egypt; Hard; M15; Singles and doubles draws	(Georgia (country)) Saba Purtseladze; 6–4, 7–6^{(7–0)}	(Italy) Alexandr Binda	(Serbia) Marko Miladinović; Daniil Ostapenkov	(Egypt) Fares Zakaria (Italy) Stefano Napolitano (Czech Republic) Dominik Kellovský (United States) Maxwell McKennon
January 12	Hurghada, Egypt; Hard; M15; Singles and doubles draws	(Turkey) S Mert Özdemir (Turkey) Mert Naci Türker; 7–6^{(7–5)}, 7–5	Sergey Betov; Daniil Ostapenkov	(Serbia) Marko Miladinović; Daniil Ostapenkov	(Egypt) Fares Zakaria (Italy) Stefano Napolitano (Czech Republic) Dominik Kellovský (United States) Maxwell McKennon
January 19	Antalya, Turkiye; Clay; M25; Singles and doubles draws	Singles and doubles competition was cancelled due to ongoing poor weather			
January 19	Santiago, Chile; Clay; M25; Singles and doubles draws	(France) Sean Cuenin; 6–1, 7–6^{(7–4)}	(Chile) Matías Soto	(Argentina) Facundo Mena (Argentina) Luciano Emanuel Ambrogi	(Romania) Sebastian Gima (Mexico) Alan Fernando Rubio Fierros (Italy) Lorenzo Bocchi (Uruguay) Joaquín Aguilar Cardozo
January 19	Santiago, Chile; Clay; M25; Singles and doubles draws	(Argentina) Luciano Emanuel Ambrogi (Argentina) Mateo del Pino; 6–4, 6–3	(Argentina) Valentín Basel (Argentina) Franco Ribero	(Argentina) Facundo Mena (Argentina) Luciano Emanuel Ambrogi	(Romania) Sebastian Gima (Mexico) Alan Fernando Rubio Fierros (Italy) Lorenzo Bocchi (Uruguay) Joaquín Aguilar Cardozo
January 19	Hyderabad, India; Hard; M15; Singles and doubles draws	(India) Karan Singh; 6–4, 6–4	(Netherlands) Max Houkes	Timofei Derepasko (United States) Keshav Chopra	(Thailand) Thanapet Chanta (India) Manish Sureshkumar (Switzerland) Jeffrey von der Schulenburg (Tunisia) Aziz Ouakaa
January 19	Hyderabad, India; Hard; M15; Singles and doubles draws	(India) Ishaque Eqbal (Kazakhstan) Grigoriy Lomakin; 6–2, 6–3	(Ukraine) Eric Vanshelboim (Switzerland) Jeffrey von der Schulenburg	Timofei Derepasko (United States) Keshav Chopra	(Thailand) Thanapet Chanta (India) Manish Sureshkumar (Switzerland) Jeffrey von der Schulenburg (Tunisia) Aziz Ouakaa
January 19	Manacor, Spain; Hard; M15; Singles and doubles draws	Yaroslav Demin; 6–1, 6–4	(Bulgaria) Ivan Ivanov	Pavel Lagutin (Belgium) Jack Logé	(United States) Gavin Young (Greece) Dimitris Azoidis (Cyprus) Melios Efstathiou (United Kingdom) Max Basing
January 19	Manacor, Spain; Hard; M15; Singles and doubles draws	(Kazakhstan) Amir Omarkhanov (United States) Gavin Young; 5–7, 6–3, [10–8]	(Australia) Ty Host; Egor Pleshivtsev	Pavel Lagutin (Belgium) Jack Logé	(United States) Gavin Young (Greece) Dimitris Azoidis (Cyprus) Melios Efstathiou (United Kingdom) Max Basing
January 19	Bagnoles-de-l'Orne, France; Clay (i); M15+H; Singles and doubles draws	(Czech Republic) Matyáš Černý; 6–1, 6–2	(France) Arthur Nagel	(France) Pierre Delage (Italy) Filippo Romano	(France) Leo Raquillet (France) Maxence Bertimon (France) Adrien Gobat (Czech Republic) Jonáš Kučera
January 19	Bagnoles-de-l'Orne, France; Clay (i); M15+H; Singles and doubles draws	(France) Marc Antoine Gaillard (France) Benjamin Jeanne-Grandinot; 6–3, 1–6, [10–8]	(Czech Republic) Matyáš Černý (Czech Republic) Jonáš Kučera	(France) Pierre Delage (Italy) Filippo Romano	(France) Leo Raquillet (France) Maxence Bertimon (France) Adrien Gobat (Czech Republic) Jonáš Kučera
January 19	Monastir, Tunisia; Hard; M15; Singles and doubles draws	(Germany) Marlon Vankan; 7–5, 6–3	(Greece) Dimitris Sakellaridis	(Ukraine) Oleksandr Ovcharenko (United States) Gianluca Brunkow	(Algeria) Toufik Sahtali (Japan) Yuto Oki (Czech Republic) Jan Kumstát (Italy) Giuseppe La Vela
January 19	Monastir, Tunisia; Hard; M15; Singles and doubles draws	(Czech Republic) Jan Kumstát (Czech Republic) Jakub Nicod; 6–3, 6–7^{(5–7)}, [11–9]	(Netherlands) Pieter De Lange (Armenia) Daniil Sarksian	(Ukraine) Oleksandr Ovcharenko (United States) Gianluca Brunkow	(Algeria) Toufik Sahtali (Japan) Yuto Oki (Czech Republic) Jan Kumstát (Italy) Giuseppe La Vela
January 26	Glasgow, United Kingdom; Hard (i); M25; Singles and doubles draws	(United Kingdom) Charles Broom; 6–4, 6–1	(United Kingdom) Lui Maxted	(United Kingdom) Giles Hussey (United Kingdom) James Story	(United Kingdom) Henry Searle (Italy) Pierluigi Basile (United Kingdom) Paul Jubb (United Kingdom) Harry Wendelken
January 26	Glasgow, United Kingdom; Hard (i); M25; Singles and doubles draws	(United Kingdom) Charles Broom (United Kingdom) Giles Hussey; 3–6, 6–3, [10–8]	(United Kingdom) Tom Hands (United Kingdom) Harry Wendelken	(United Kingdom) Giles Hussey (United Kingdom) James Story	(United Kingdom) Henry Searle (Italy) Pierluigi Basile (United Kingdom) Paul Jubb (United Kingdom) Harry Wendelken
January 26	Nußloch, Germany; Carpet (i); M25; Singles and doubles draws	(Germany) Daniel Masur; 6–4, 4–6, 6–1	(Latvia) Kārlis Ozoliņš	(Germany) Tom Gentzsch (Ukraine) Oleg Prihodko	(Germany) Nino Ehrenschneider (Denmark) Carl Emil Overbeck (Czech Republic) Matthew William Donald (Switzerland) Dominic Stricker
January 26	Nußloch, Germany; Carpet (i); M25; Singles and doubles draws	(Belgium) Tibo Colson (Germany) Daniel Masur; 6–4, 7–6^{(7–4)}	(Czech Republic) Jan Jermář (Czech Republic) Dominik Reček	(Germany) Tom Gentzsch (Ukraine) Oleg Prihodko	(Germany) Nino Ehrenschneider (Denmark) Carl Emil Overbeck (Czech Republic) Matthew William Donald (Switzerland) Dominic Stricker
January 26	Hyderabad, India; Hard; M15; Singles and doubles draws	(Thailand) Pawit Sornlaksup; 6–3, 6–1	(India) Manish Sureshkumar	(United States) Keshav Chopra; Timofei Derepasko	(India) Aditya Balsekar (Israel) Amit Vales (India) Vishnu Vardhan (India) Mukund Sasikumar
January 26	Hyderabad, India; Hard; M15; Singles and doubles draws	(India) Sai Karteek Reddy Ganta (India) Vishnu Vardhan; 6–1, 6–4	(India) Ishaque Eqbal (India) Dev Javia	(United States) Keshav Chopra; Timofei Derepasko	(India) Aditya Balsekar (Israel) Amit Vales (India) Vishnu Vardhan (India) Mukund Sasikumar
January 26	Zahra, Kuwait; Hard; M15; Singles and doubles draws	(Uzbekistan) Khumoyun Sultanov; 6–4, 6–2	(Switzerland) Luca Staeheli	Evgeny Karlovskiy (France) Constantin Bittoun Kouzmine	(Romania) Robert Guna (Turkey) Melih Anavatan (France) Valentin Lapalu (Armenia) Daniil Sarksian
January 26	Zahra, Kuwait; Hard; M15; Singles and doubles draws	(Turkey) S Mert Özdemir (Turkey) Mert Naci Türker; 5–7, 6–4, [10–6]	(France) Constantin Bittoun Kouzmine (Uzbekistan) Khumoyun Sultanov	Evgeny Karlovskiy (France) Constantin Bittoun Kouzmine	(Romania) Robert Guna (Turkey) Melih Anavatan (France) Valentin Lapalu (Armenia) Daniil Sarksian
January 26	Antalya, Turkiye; Clay; M15; Singles and doubles draws	(Serbia) Stefan Popović; 7–6^{(7–1)}, 6–2	(Bulgaria) Iliyan Radulov	(Serbia) Dušan Obradović (Spain) Max Alcalá Gurri	(Italy) Gianluca Cadenasso (Venezuela) Ignacio Parisca Romera (Hungary) Attila Boros (Netherlands) Ryan Nijboer
January 26	Antalya, Turkiye; Clay; M15; Singles and doubles draws	(Italy) Niccolò Ciavarella (Italy) Daniele Minighini; 7–6^{(7–3)}, 6–4	(Japan) Shu Muto; Denis Vishenchuk Vishenko	(Serbia) Dušan Obradović (Spain) Max Alcalá Gurri	(Italy) Gianluca Cadenasso (Venezuela) Ignacio Parisca Romera (Hungary) Attila Boros (Netherlands) Ryan Nijboer
January 26	Sharm El Sheikh, Egypt; Hard; M15; Singles and doubles draws	(Italy) Samuel Vincent Ruggeri; 6–2, 6–4	Semen Pankin	Kirill Kivattsev (Hungary) Péter Makk	(United Kingdom) Luke Hooper (Ukraine) Aleksandr Braynin (Ukraine) Georgii Kravchenko (Belgium) Romain Faucon
January 26	Sharm El Sheikh, Egypt; Hard; M15; Singles and doubles draws	(Ukraine) Aleksandr Braynin (Ukraine) Georgii Kravchenko; 7–6^{(7–2)}, 7–5	(Australia) Adrian Arcon (Australia) Stefan Storch	Kirill Kivattsev (Hungary) Péter Makk	(United Kingdom) Luke Hooper (Ukraine) Aleksandr Braynin (Ukraine) Georgii Kravchenko (Belgium) Romain Faucon
January 26	Monastir, Tunisia; Hard; M15; Singles and doubles draws	(Bulgaria) Petr Nesterov; 6–4, 6–4	(Poland) Tomasz Berkieta	(Ukraine) Oleksandr Ovcharenko; Egor Agafonov	(Japan) Keisuke Saitoh (Spain) Sergi Pérez Contri (Tunisia) Alaa Trifi (Senegal) Seydina André
January 26	Monastir, Tunisia; Hard; M15; Singles and doubles draws	(South Korea) Cho Seung-woo (South Korea) Kim Geun-jun; 6–7^{(4–7)}, 6–2, [10–8]	(China) Chen Xianfeng (China) Zhang Tianhui	(Ukraine) Oleksandr Ovcharenko; Egor Agafonov	(Japan) Keisuke Saitoh (Spain) Sergi Pérez Contri (Tunisia) Alaa Trifi (Senegal) Seydina André
January 26	Naples, United States; Clay; M15; Singles and doubles draws	(United States) William Grant; 6–2, 6–3	(Portugal) Duarte Vale	(United States) Ryan Colby (Italy) Tommaso Compagnucci	(United States) Andrew Johnson (United States) Ronit Karki (United States) Matthew Segura (Morocco) Taha Baadi
January 26	Naples, United States; Clay; M15; Singles and doubles draws	(United States) Tristan McCormick (United States) Jesse Witten; 6–4, 1–6, [10–5]	(United States) Ezekiel Clark (United States) Hunter Heck	(United States) Ryan Colby (Italy) Tommaso Compagnucci	(United States) Andrew Johnson (United States) Ronit Karki (United States) Matthew Segura (Morocco) Taha Baadi
January 26	Huamantla, Mexico; Hard; M15; Singles and doubles draws	(United States) Braden Shick; 6–1, 6–2	(United States) Gage Brymer	(Canada) Benjamin Thomas George (Sweden) Melvin Kumar	(United States) Alex Kobelt (France) Guillaume Dalmasso (Italy) Matteo Covato (Brazil) Natan Rodrigues
January 26	Huamantla, Mexico; Hard; M15; Singles and doubles draws	(Italy) Matteo Covato (Colombia) Juan Sebastián Gómez; 5–7, 6–3, [10–7]	(Brazil) Lucca Pinto (Brazil) Natan Rodrigues	(Canada) Benjamin Thomas George (Sweden) Melvin Kumar	(United States) Alex Kobelt (France) Guillaume Dalmasso (Italy) Matteo Covato (Brazil) Natan Rodrigues

=== February ===
Week of	Tournament	Winner	Runners-up	Semifinalists	Quarterfinalists
February 2	Sheffield, United Kingdom; Hard (i); M25; Singles and doubles draws	(United Kingdom) Harry Wendelken; 6–7^{(5–7)}, 6–3, 6–2	(United Kingdom) Paul Jubb	(Romania) Vladislav Melnic (United Kingdom) Emile Hudd	(United Kingdom) Henry Searle (United Kingdom) Anton Matusevich (United Kingdom) Toby Martin (Sweden) Nikola Slavic
February 2	Sheffield, United Kingdom; Hard (i); M25; Singles and doubles draws	(United Kingdom) Emile Hudd (United Kingdom) Anton Matusevich; 7–6^{(7–4)}, 6–3	(United Kingdom) Lui Maxted (United Kingdom) Finn Murgett	(Romania) Vladislav Melnic (United Kingdom) Emile Hudd	(United Kingdom) Henry Searle (United Kingdom) Anton Matusevich (United Kingdom) Toby Martin (Sweden) Nikola Slavic
February 2	Monastir, Tunisia; Hard; M25; Singles and doubles draws	(France) Maxime Chazal; 7–6^{(7–2)}, 6–2	(Italy) Massimo Giunta	(China) Te Rigele (Spain) John Echeverría	(France) Nicolas Robert (Poland) Tomasz Berkieta (Spain) Mario González Fernández; Egor Agafonov
February 2	Monastir, Tunisia; Hard; M25; Singles and doubles draws	(Poland) Tomasz Berkieta (United States) Christopher Papa; 7–6^{(7–5)}, 7–5	(Bulgaria) Anthony Genov (United Kingdom) Ewen Lumsden	(China) Te Rigele (Spain) John Echeverría	(France) Nicolas Robert (Poland) Tomasz Berkieta (Spain) Mario González Fernández; Egor Agafonov
February 2	Zahra, Kuwait; Hard; M15; Singles and doubles draws	(India) Manas Dhamne; 7–5, 6–3	(Monaco) Rocco Piatti	(Switzerland) Luca Staeheli (United States) Tristan Stringer	Evgeny Karlovskiy (France) Valentin Lapalu (Germany) Noah Thurner (France) Constantin Bittoun Kouzmine
February 2	Zahra, Kuwait; Hard; M15; Singles and doubles draws	(France) Constantin Bittoun Kouzmine (Switzerland) Luca Staeheli; 6–3, 6–4	(Kuwait) Bader Alabdullah (Kuwait) Essa Qabazard	(Switzerland) Luca Staeheli (United States) Tristan Stringer	Evgeny Karlovskiy (France) Valentin Lapalu (Germany) Noah Thurner (France) Constantin Bittoun Kouzmine
February 2	Jávea, Spain; Clay; M15; Singles and doubles draws	(Spain) Carles Córdoba; 6–4, 6–7^{(6–8)}, 6–1	(Italy) Gabriele Maria Noce	(Italy) Manuel Mazza (Spain) Sergi Pérez Contri	(Venezuela) Ignacio Parisca Romera (Spain) Javier Molino (Spain) Eudald González (Spain) Carles Hernández
February 2	Jávea, Spain; Clay; M15; Singles and doubles draws	(France) Maxence Bertimon (France) Arthur Nagel; 6–1, 6–4	(Italy) Manuel Mazza (Italy) Gabriele Maria Noce	(Italy) Manuel Mazza (Spain) Sergi Pérez Contri	(Venezuela) Ignacio Parisca Romera (Spain) Javier Molino (Spain) Eudald González (Spain) Carles Hernández
February 2	Antalya, Turkiye; Clay; M15; Singles and doubles draws	(Romania) Filip Cristian Jianu; 6–3, 2–0 ret.	(Japan) Akira Santillan	(Netherlands) Ryan Nijboer; Denis Klok	(Romania) Radu Mihai Papoe (Norway) Johan Oscar Lien (Japan) Makoto Ochi (Poland) Alan Ważny
February 2	Antalya, Turkiye; Clay; M15; Singles and doubles draws	(Romania) Mihai Răzvan Marinescu (Italy) Samuele Pieri; 6–3, 6–4	(Romania) Calin Apostol (Romania) Dan Alexandru Tomescu	(Netherlands) Ryan Nijboer; Denis Klok	(Romania) Radu Mihai Papoe (Norway) Johan Oscar Lien (Japan) Makoto Ochi (Poland) Alan Ważny
February 2	Sharm El Sheikh, Egypt; Hard; M15; Singles and doubles draws	(Italy) Samuel Vincent Ruggeri; 6–4, 7–6^{(9–7)}	(Italy) Alessandro Pecci	(South Korea) Kim Dong-ju (Ukraine) Georgii Kravchenko	Egor Pleshivtsev (Hungary) Péter Makk (Ukraine) Aleksandr Braynin (Austria) Maximilian Neuchrist
February 2	Sharm El Sheikh, Egypt; Hard; M15; Singles and doubles draws	(Croatia) Mili Poljičak (United States) Billy Suarez; 7–6^{(8–6)}, 6–4	(Ukraine) Aleksandr Braynin (Ukraine) Georgii Kravchenko	(South Korea) Kim Dong-ju (Ukraine) Georgii Kravchenko	Egor Pleshivtsev (Hungary) Péter Makk (Ukraine) Aleksandr Braynin (Austria) Maximilian Neuchrist
February 2	Monastir, Tunisia; Hard; M15; Singles and doubles draws	(France) Nicolas Tepmahc; 6–1, 4–6, 6–0	(Algeria) Toufik Sahtali	(South Korea) Gerard Campaña Lee (Kazakhstan) Amir Omarkhanov	(South Korea) Cho Seung-woo (France) César Bouchelaghem (Spain) Jorge Plans (France) Louis Larue
February 2	Monastir, Tunisia; Hard; M15; Singles and doubles draws	(France) Theo Herrmann (Algeria) Toufik Sahtali; 6–1, 6–3	(Italy) Andrea De Marchi (Sweden) William Rejchtman Vinciguerra	(South Korea) Gerard Campaña Lee (Kazakhstan) Amir Omarkhanov	(South Korea) Cho Seung-woo (France) César Bouchelaghem (Spain) Jorge Plans (France) Louis Larue
February 2	Palm Coast, United States; Clay; M15; Singles and doubles draws	(Italy) Tommaso Compagnucci; 6–3, 7–6^{(7–3)}	(United States) Ryan Colby	(Brazil) João Vítor Gonçalves Ceolin (Argentina) Fermín Tenti	(United States) Andrew Fenty (Serbia) Aleksa Ćirić (United States) Jerrid Gaines Jr. (Argentina) Ignacio Monzón
February 2	Palm Coast, United States; Clay; M15; Singles and doubles draws	(Argentina) Ignacio Monzón (Argentina) Fermín Tenti; 7–6^{(7–4)}, 6–4	(Italy) Tommaso Compagnucci (Argentina) Manuel Mouilleron Salvo	(Brazil) João Vítor Gonçalves Ceolin (Argentina) Fermín Tenti	(United States) Andrew Fenty (Serbia) Aleksa Ćirić (United States) Jerrid Gaines Jr. (Argentina) Ignacio Monzón
February 2	Huamantla, Mexico; Hard; M15; Singles and doubles draws	(United States) Braden Shick; 6–3, 6–0	(United States) Alafia Ayeni	(United Kingdom) Stefan Cooper (Brazil) Natan Rodrigues	(United States) Axel Nefve (Argentina) Nicolas Hollender (United States) Nathan Ponwith (United States) Alex Kuperstein
February 2	Huamantla, Mexico; Hard; M15; Singles and doubles draws	(Brazil) Lucca Pinto (Brazil) Natan Rodrigues; 6–4, 6–4	(United States) Alafia Ayeni (Colombia) Andrés Urrea	(United Kingdom) Stefan Cooper (Brazil) Natan Rodrigues	(United States) Axel Nefve (Argentina) Nicolas Hollender (United States) Nathan Ponwith (United States) Alex Kuperstein
February 9	Vila Real de Santo António, Portugal; Hard; M25; Singles and doubles draws	(United Kingdom) Max Basing; 6–1, 2–6, 6–4	(Colombia) Adrià Soriano Barrera	(Belgium) Gauthier Onclin (United Kingdom) Liam Broady	(Japan) Kaichi Uchida (Portugal) Gastão Elias (Sweden) Olle Wallin (Portugal) João Domingues
February 9	Vila Real de Santo António, Portugal; Hard; M25; Singles and doubles draws	(Netherlands) Brian Bozemoj (Netherlands) Stijn Pel; 4–6, 6–3, [10–7]	(United Kingdom) Lui Maxted (United Kingdom) Finn Murgett	(Belgium) Gauthier Onclin (United Kingdom) Liam Broady	(Japan) Kaichi Uchida (Portugal) Gastão Elias (Sweden) Olle Wallin (Portugal) João Domingues
February 9	Antalya, Turkiye; Clay; M25; Singles and doubles draws	(Romania) Gabi Adrian Boitan; 6–4, 7–6^{(7–1)}	(Spain) Max Alcalá Gurri	(Italy) Samuele Pieri (Japan) Akira Santillan	(Spain) Oriol Roca Batalla; Andrey Chepelev (Slovakia) Andrej Martin (Belgium) Martin van der Meerschen
February 9	Antalya, Turkiye; Clay; M25; Singles and doubles draws	(United Kingdom) Felix Mischker (Belgium) Martin van der Meerschen; 6–1, 2–6, [10–8]	(Bulgaria) Yanaki Milev (Serbia) Stefan Popović	(Italy) Samuele Pieri (Japan) Akira Santillan	(Spain) Oriol Roca Batalla; Andrey Chepelev (Slovakia) Andrej Martin (Belgium) Martin van der Meerschen
February 9	Monastir, Tunisia; Hard; M25; Singles and doubles draws	(Ivory Coast) Eliakim Coulibaly; 6–3, 6–3	(France) Thomas Faurel	(Switzerland) Johan Nikles (France) Mickael Kaouk	(Algeria) Toufik Sahtali (Germany) Marlon Vankan (Turkey) Ergi Kırkın (Italy) Federico Iannaccone
February 9	Monastir, Tunisia; Hard; M25; Singles and doubles draws	(Italy) Alessandro Mondazzi (Italy) Matteo Sciahbasi; 6–2, 7–6^{(7–4)}	(France) Liam Branger (France) Leo Deflandre	(Switzerland) Johan Nikles (France) Mickael Kaouk	(Algeria) Toufik Sahtali (Germany) Marlon Vankan (Turkey) Ergi Kırkın (Italy) Federico Iannaccone
February 9	Almoradi, Spain; Clay; M15; Singles and doubles draws	(Spain) Sergi Pérez Contri; 6–4, 7–5	(Spain) Alejandro Juan Mano	(Hungary) Matyas Fuele (Venezuela) Ignacio Parisca Romera	(France) Maxence Bertimon (Spain) Diego Augusto Barreto Sánchez (Spain) Lucca Helguera Casado (Netherlands) Ryan Nijboer
February 9	Almoradi, Spain; Clay; M15; Singles and doubles draws	(Hungary) Matyas Fuele (Norway) Herman Hoeyeraal; 6–4, 3–6, [10–7]	(Morocco) Younes Lalami (Spain) David Naharro	(Hungary) Matyas Fuele (Venezuela) Ignacio Parisca Romera	(France) Maxence Bertimon (Spain) Diego Augusto Barreto Sánchez (Spain) Lucca Helguera Casado (Netherlands) Ryan Nijboer
February 9	Oberhaching, Germany; Hard (i); M15; Singles and doubles draws	(United Kingdom) Paul Jubb; 6–2, 6–0	(Germany) Marvin Möller	(Switzerland) Mika Brunold (Italy) Stefano Napolitano	(Germany) Niels McDonald (France) Maé Malige (Germany) Daniel Masur; Yaroslav Demin
February 9	Oberhaching, Germany; Hard (i); M15; Singles and doubles draws	(Czech Republic) Štěpán Pecák (Czech Republic) Denis Peták; 6–4, 6–3	(Germany) Daniel Masur (Germany) Vincent Reisach	(Switzerland) Mika Brunold (Italy) Stefano Napolitano	(Germany) Niels McDonald (France) Maé Malige (Germany) Daniel Masur; Yaroslav Demin
February 9	Sharm El Sheikh, Egypt; Hard; M15; Singles and doubles draws	(Georgia (country)) Saba Purtseladze; 6–2, 3–6, 7–6^{(9–7)}	(Belgium) Romain Faucon	Evgenii Tiurnev (Croatia) Mili Poljičak	(Italy) Alessandro Pecci (Australia) Jacob Bradshaw (Italy) Samuel Vincent Ruggeri; Sergey Petrov
February 9	Sharm El Sheikh, Egypt; Hard; M15; Singles and doubles draws	(Denmark) Oskar Brostrøm Poulsen (Sweden) Nikola Slavic; 6–1, 7–6^{(7–3)}	(Czech Republic) Jan Hrazdil (Egypt) Karim Ibrahim	Evgenii Tiurnev (Croatia) Mili Poljičak	(Italy) Alessandro Pecci (Australia) Jacob Bradshaw (Italy) Samuel Vincent Ruggeri; Sergey Petrov
February 9	Monastir, Tunisia; Hard; M15; Singles and doubles draws	(Turkey) Yankı Erel; 1–6, 6–0, 6–4	(Italy) Daniele Rapagnetta	(France) Nicolas Tepmahc (Poland) Tomasz Berkieta	(France) Theo Herrmann (Italy) Gabriele Bosio (United States) Enzo Wallart (Croatia) Josip Šimundža
February 9	Monastir, Tunisia; Hard; M15; Singles and doubles draws	(South Korea) Cho Seung-woo (South Korea) Kim Geun-jun; 6–1, 6–1	(France) Mateo Bivol (France) Victor Paganetti	(France) Nicolas Tepmahc (Poland) Tomasz Berkieta	(France) Theo Herrmann (Italy) Gabriele Bosio (United States) Enzo Wallart (Croatia) Josip Šimundža
February 9	Sunrise, United States; Clay; M15; Singles and doubles draws	(United States) Andrew Johnson; 4–6, 6–4, 6–0	(Romania) Dragoș Nicolae Cazacu	(Argentina) Ignacio Monzón (United States) Bruno Kuzuhara	(France) Charles Bertimon (Italy) Tommaso Compagnucci (United States) Axel Nefve (Argentina) Fermin Tenti
February 9	Sunrise, United States; Clay; M15; Singles and doubles draws	(Germany) John Sperle (France) Louis Tessa; 6–4, 6–1	(Brazil) João Victor Couto Loureiro (Hong Kong) Wong Tsz-fu	(Argentina) Ignacio Monzón (United States) Bruno Kuzuhara	(France) Charles Bertimon (Italy) Tommaso Compagnucci (United States) Axel Nefve (Argentina) Fermin Tenti
February 16	Vila Real de Santo António, Portugal; Hard; M25; Singles and doubles draws	(Belgium) Gauthier Onclin; 6–3, 6–2	(United Kingdom) Lui Maxted	(United Kingdom) Max Basing (Italy) Raúl Brancaccio	(United Kingdom) Ryan Peniston (Portugal) Tiago Pereira (Portugal) Gastão Elias (Japan) Kaichi Uchida
February 16	Vila Real de Santo António, Portugal; Hard; M25; Singles and doubles draws	(United Kingdom) Lui Maxted (United Kingdom) Finn Murgett; 2–6, 6–3, [10–5]	(Denmark) Benjamin Hannestad (Denmark) Carl Emil Overbeck	(United Kingdom) Max Basing (Italy) Raúl Brancaccio	(United Kingdom) Ryan Peniston (Portugal) Tiago Pereira (Portugal) Gastão Elias (Japan) Kaichi Uchida
February 16	Trento, Italy; Hard (i); M25; Singles and doubles draws	(Italy) Andrea Guerrieri; 7–6^{(7–3)}, 7–6^{(7–4)}	(Italy) Jacopo Vasamì	(Germany) Marko Topo (Italy) Francesco Forti	(Italy) Filippo Romano (Germany) Marvin Möller (Bosnia and Herzegovina) Mirza Bašić (Germany) Daniel Masur
February 16	Trento, Italy; Hard (i); M25; Singles and doubles draws	(Italy) Francesco Forti (Italy) Filippo Romano; 6–3, 6–3	(United Kingdom) Tom Hands (United Kingdom) Harry Wendelken	(Germany) Marko Topo (Italy) Francesco Forti	(Italy) Filippo Romano (Germany) Marvin Möller (Bosnia and Herzegovina) Mirza Bašić (Germany) Daniel Masur
February 16	San José, Costa Rica; Hard (i); M25; Singles and doubles draws	(United States) Gavin Young; 3–6, 7–6^{(7–4)}, 7–6^{(7–4)}	(United States) Daniel Milavsky	(Italy) Giuseppe La Vela (Latvia) Kārlis Ozoliņš	(Brazil) Gustavo Ribeiro de Almeida (Dominican Republic) Peter Bertran (United States) Andrew Fenty (Germany) Robert Strombachs
February 16	San José, Costa Rica; Hard (i); M25; Singles and doubles draws	(Brazil) Gustavo Ribeiro de Almeida (United States) Alex Kuperstein; 6–4, 6–3	(United States) Jayson Blando (United States) Michael Blando	(Italy) Giuseppe La Vela (Latvia) Kārlis Ozoliņš	(Brazil) Gustavo Ribeiro de Almeida (Dominican Republic) Peter Bertran (United States) Andrew Fenty (Germany) Robert Strombachs
February 16	Villena, Spain; Hard; M15; Singles and doubles draws	(Hungary) Péter Makk; 6–3, 6–4	(Spain) Alejo Sánchez Quílez	(United States) Dali Blanch (Spain) Sergio Callejón Hernando	(Spain) Carles Hernández (Switzerland) Luca Staeheli (South Korea) Gerard Campaña Lee (France) Maxime Chazal
February 16	Villena, Spain; Hard; M15; Singles and doubles draws	(Switzerland) Adrien Burdet (Spain) Oscar José Gutierrez; 3–6, 6–2, [10–8]	(Norway) Herman Hoeyeraal (Norway) Andreja Petrovic	(United States) Dali Blanch (Spain) Sergio Callejón Hernando	(Spain) Carles Hernández (Switzerland) Luca Staeheli (South Korea) Gerard Campaña Lee (France) Maxime Chazal
February 16	Lannion, France; Hard (i); M15; Singles and doubles draws	(France) Robin Catry; 7–5, 6–4	(Belgium) Tibo Colson	(France) Yanis Ghazouani Durand (France) Adrien Gobat	(France) Lucas Poullain (France) Leo Lagarrigue (France) Maxence Bertimon (France) Arthur Nagel
February 16	Lannion, France; Hard (i); M15; Singles and doubles draws	(France) Constantin Bittoun Kouzmine (United Kingdom) Marcus Walters; 6–0, 2–6, [10–6]	(France) Adan Freire da Silva (France) Yanis Ghazouani Durand	(France) Yanis Ghazouani Durand (France) Adrien Gobat	(France) Lucas Poullain (France) Leo Lagarrigue (France) Maxence Bertimon (France) Arthur Nagel
February 16	The Hague, Netherlands; Hard (i); M15; Singles and doubles draws	(United Kingdom) Anton Matusevich; 3–6, 6–4, 6–4	(Germany) Mika Petkovic	(Finland) Oskari Paldanius (Netherlands) Thijs Boogaard	(Luxembourg) Alex Knaff (Netherlands) Alec Deckers; Yaroslav Demin (Netherlands) Niels Visker
February 16	The Hague, Netherlands; Hard (i); M15; Singles and doubles draws	(Netherlands) Jarno Jans (Netherlands) Niels Visker; 7–5, 6–4	(Netherlands) Stijn Paardekooper (Netherlands) Fons van Sambeek	(Finland) Oskari Paldanius (Netherlands) Thijs Boogaard	(Luxembourg) Alex Knaff (Netherlands) Alec Deckers; Yaroslav Demin (Netherlands) Niels Visker
February 16	Antalya, Turkiye; Clay; M15; Singles and doubles draws	(Romania) Cezar Crețu; 6–2, 6–3	(Bulgaria) Iliyan Radulov	(Spain) Max Alcalá Gurri (Ukraine) Viacheslav Bielinskyi	(Romania) Daniel Uță (Bulgaria) Yanaki Milev (France) Antoni Fabre (Iran) Ali Yazdani
February 16	Antalya, Turkiye; Clay; M15; Singles and doubles draws	(Croatia) Admir Kalender (Serbia) Stefan Popović; 6–3, 6–4	(Romania) Daniel Uță (Iran) Ali Yazdani	(Spain) Max Alcalá Gurri (Ukraine) Viacheslav Bielinskyi	(Romania) Daniel Uță (Bulgaria) Yanaki Milev (France) Antoni Fabre (Iran) Ali Yazdani
February 16	Sharm El Sheikh, Egypt; Hard; M15; Singles and doubles draws	(Denmark) Oskar Brostrøm Poulsen; 3–6, 7–6^{(7–4)}, 6–2	Semen Pankin	(Australia) Jacob Bradshaw vs (Italy) Leonardo Rossi	(Belgium) Romain Faucon (Egypt) Amr Elsayed (Switzerland) Noah Lopez (Egypt) Michael Bassem Sobhy
February 16	Sharm El Sheikh, Egypt; Hard; M15; Singles and doubles draws	(Denmark) Oskar Brostrøm Poulsen (Sweden) Nikola Slavic; 6–4, 4–1 ret.	(Egypt) Karim Ibrahim (Ukraine) Volodymyr Uzhylovskyi	(Australia) Jacob Bradshaw vs (Italy) Leonardo Rossi	(Belgium) Romain Faucon (Egypt) Amr Elsayed (Switzerland) Noah Lopez (Egypt) Michael Bassem Sobhy
February 16	Monastir, Tunisia; Hard; M15; Singles and doubles draws	(France) César Bouchelaghem; 7–5, 6–1	(Belgium) Jack Logé	Maxim Zhukov (France) Thomas Faurel	(Turkey) Yankı Erel (Chinese Taipei) Lee Kuan-yi (Sweden) Leo Borg (Turkey) Ergi Kırkın
February 16	Monastir, Tunisia; Hard; M15; Singles and doubles draws	(Kazakhstan) Amir Omarkhanov (Italy) Matteo Sciahbasi; 6–4, 6–3	(France) Alexandre Aubriot (France) César Bouchelaghem	Maxim Zhukov (France) Thomas Faurel	(Turkey) Yankı Erel (Chinese Taipei) Lee Kuan-yi (Sweden) Leo Borg (Turkey) Ergi Kırkın
February 16	Naples, United States; Clay; M15; Singles and doubles draws	(Italy) Tommaso Compagnucci; 6–4, 6–3	(United States) Hunter Heck	(Italy) Davide Tortora (Germany) Louis Wessels	(United States) Evan Bynoe (United States) Michael Antonius (United States) Teodor Davidov (United States) Mwendwa Mbithi
February 16	Naples, United States; Clay; M15; Singles and doubles draws	(United States) Dakotah Bobo (Sweden) Oliver Johansson; 6–0, 6–1	(Brazil) João Victor Couto Loureiro (Hong Kong) Wong Tsz-fu	(Italy) Davide Tortora (Germany) Louis Wessels	(United States) Evan Bynoe (United States) Michael Antonius (United States) Teodor Davidov (United States) Mwendwa Mbithi
February 23	Burnie, Australia; Hard; M25; Singles and doubles draws	(Australia) Enzo Aguiard; 6–3, 6–4	(Australia) Li Tu	(Australia) Moerani Bouzige (Australia) Omar Jasika	(Japan) Keisuke Saitoh (Japan) Shinji Hazawa (New Zealand) Ajeet Rai (Australia) Pavle Marinkov
February 23	Burnie, Australia; Hard; M25; Singles and doubles draws	(Australia) Ethan Cook (Australia) Tai Sach; 6–3, 6–2	(Japan) Keisuke Saitoh (Japan) Taiyo Yamanaka	(Australia) Moerani Bouzige (Australia) Omar Jasika	(Japan) Keisuke Saitoh (Japan) Shinji Hazawa (New Zealand) Ajeet Rai (Australia) Pavle Marinkov
February 23	Vale do Lobo, Portugal; Hard; M25; Singles and doubles draws	(United Kingdom) Toby Samuel; 6–3, 6–4	(United Kingdom) Giles Hussey	(Spain) Mario González Fernández (Portugal) Tiago Pereira	(Austria) Lukas Neumayer (United Kingdom) Henry Searle (Belgium) Gauthier Onclin (Ukraine) Georgii Kravchenko
February 23	Vale do Lobo, Portugal; Hard; M25; Singles and doubles draws	(Canada) Justin Boulais (Portugal) Tiago Pereira; 6–2, 6–3	(Portugal) João Domingues (Portugal) Diogo Marques	(Spain) Mario González Fernández (Portugal) Tiago Pereira	(Austria) Lukas Neumayer (United Kingdom) Henry Searle (Belgium) Gauthier Onclin (Ukraine) Georgii Kravchenko
February 23	Pszczyna, Poland; Hard (i); M25; Singles and doubles draws	(Austria) Sebastian Sorger; 6–2, 6–1	(France) Maé Malige	(United Kingdom) Harry Wendelken (Sweden) Olle Wallin	(Czech Republic) Jan Kumstát (Germany) Daniel Masur (Ukraine) Vadym Ursu (Netherlands) Jelle Sels
February 23	Pszczyna, Poland; Hard (i); M25; Singles and doubles draws	(Germany) Daniel Masur (Sweden) Olle Wallin; 7–5, 6–3	(United Kingdom) Tom Hands (United Kingdom) Harry Wendelken	(United Kingdom) Harry Wendelken (Sweden) Olle Wallin	(Czech Republic) Jan Kumstát (Germany) Daniel Masur (Ukraine) Vadym Ursu (Netherlands) Jelle Sels
February 23	Villena, Spain; Hard; M15; Singles and doubles draws	(Netherlands) Sander Jong; 6–3, 6–7^{(3–7)}, 6–3	(Spain) Alejo Sánchez Quílez	(United Kingdom) Paul Jubb (Spain) Alejandro Juan Mano	(Colombia) Samuel Heredia (United Kingdom) Emile Hudd (Germany) Luca Wiedenmann (Spain) Enrique Carrascosa Díaz
February 23	Villena, Spain; Hard; M15; Singles and doubles draws	(Lebanon) Peter Alam (Finland) Iiro Vasa; 6–4, 6–1	(Switzerland) Adrien Burdet (Spain) Oscar José Gutierrez	(United Kingdom) Paul Jubb (Spain) Alejandro Juan Mano	(Colombia) Samuel Heredia (United Kingdom) Emile Hudd (Germany) Luca Wiedenmann (Spain) Enrique Carrascosa Díaz
February 23	Antalya, Turkiye; Clay; M15; Singles and doubles draws	Andrey Chepelev; 1–6, 6–4, 6–1	(Spain) Max Alcalá Gurri	(Austria) Sandro Kopp (Italy) Juan Cruz Martin Manzano	(Serbia) Stefan Popović (Romania) Ștefan Adrian Andreescu (Venezuela) Ignacio Parisca Romera (Spain) Carles Córdoba
February 23	Antalya, Turkiye; Clay; M15; Singles and doubles draws	(Croatia) Admir Kalender (Serbia) Stefan Popović; 6–2, 3–6, [10–8]	(Italy) Gabriele Maria Noce (Italy) Noah Perfetti	(Austria) Sandro Kopp (Italy) Juan Cruz Martin Manzano	(Serbia) Stefan Popović (Romania) Ștefan Adrian Andreescu (Venezuela) Ignacio Parisca Romera (Spain) Carles Córdoba
February 23	Sharm El Sheikh, Egypt; Hard; M15; Singles and doubles draws	(Serbia) Ognjen Milić; 6–1, 6–4	(Egypt) Fares Zakaria	(Australia) Jacob Bradshaw; Semen Pankin	Anton Arzhankin (Turkey) Melih Anavatan (Hungary) Achilles Belkovics (Bulgaria) Anas Mazdrashki
February 23	Sharm El Sheikh, Egypt; Hard; M15; Singles and doubles draws	(Egypt) Michael Bassem Sobhy (Egypt) Fares Zakaria; 7–6^{(7–5)}, 6–4	(Turkey) Tuncay Duran (Ukraine) Volodymyr Uzhylovskyi	(Australia) Jacob Bradshaw; Semen Pankin	Anton Arzhankin (Turkey) Melih Anavatan (Hungary) Achilles Belkovics (Bulgaria) Anas Mazdrashki
February 23	Monastir, Tunisia; Hard; M15; Singles and doubles draws	(Germany) Nikolai Barsukov; 6–2, 6–3	(Italy) Andrea De Marchi	(Algeria) Toufik Sahtali (Tunisia) Alaa Trifi	(Slovenia) Mak Mikovič (Italy) Luca Castagnola; Kirill Kivattsev (New Zealand) Anton Shepp
February 23	Monastir, Tunisia; Hard; M15; Singles and doubles draws	(New Zealand) Isaac Becroft (New Zealand) Anton Shepp; 6–7^{(3–7)}, 6–4, [10–7]	(Republic of Ireland) Conor Gannon (South Africa) Thando Longwe-Smit	(Algeria) Toufik Sahtali (Tunisia) Alaa Trifi	(Slovenia) Mak Mikovič (Italy) Luca Castagnola; Kirill Kivattsev (New Zealand) Anton Shepp
February 23	Naples, United States; Clay; M15; Singles and doubles draws	(United States) J. J. Wolf; 6–2, 6–4	(Colombia) Miguel Tobón	(Sweden) John Hallquist Lithén (United States) Maxwell Exsted	(United States) Gianluca Brunkow (Germany) Louis Wessels (United States) Evan Bynoe (United States) Kaylan Bigun
February 23	Naples, United States; Clay; M15; Singles and doubles draws	(United Kingdom) Adam Jones (United Kingdom) Toby Martin; 6–4, 6–2	(United States) Maxwell Exsted (Colombia) Miguel Tobón	(Sweden) John Hallquist Lithén (United States) Maxwell Exsted	(United States) Gianluca Brunkow (Germany) Louis Wessels (United States) Evan Bynoe (United States) Kaylan Bigun
February 23	San José, Costa Rica; Hard; M15; Singles and doubles draws	(Jamaica) Blaise Bicknell; 6–2, 6–4	(Dominican Republic) Nick Hardt	(Mexico) Alan Fernando Rubio Fierros (France) Guillaume Dalmasso	(Germany) Robert Strombachs (Italy) Giuseppe La Vela (Italy) Pietro Fellin (United States) Andrew Fenty
February 23	San José, Costa Rica; Hard; M15; Singles and doubles draws	(Estonia) Johannes Seeman (Germany) Robert Strombachs; 6–4, 4–6, [10–8]	(Colombia) Juan Miguel Bolívar Idárraga (El Salvador) Juan Carlos Fuentes Vásquez	(Mexico) Alan Fernando Rubio Fierros (France) Guillaume Dalmasso	(Germany) Robert Strombachs (Italy) Giuseppe La Vela (Italy) Pietro Fellin (United States) Andrew Fenty

=== March ===
Week of	Tournament	Winner	Runners-up	Semifinalists	Quarterfinalists
March 2	Launceston, Australia; Hard; M25; Singles and doubles draws	(Chinese Taipei) Hsu Yu-hsiou; 6–2, 6–3	(Japan) Hiroki Moriya	(Australia) Matthew Dellavedova (Australia) Omar Jasika	(Australia) Duje Markovina (Australia) Moerani Bouzige (Australia) Scott Jones (Australia) Li Tu
March 2	Launceston, Australia; Hard; M25; Singles and doubles draws	(Japan) Yamato Sueoka (Japan) Ryotaro Taguchi; 6–3, 7–5	(Australia) Joshua Charlton (Northern Mariana Islands) Colin Sinclair	(Australia) Matthew Dellavedova (Australia) Omar Jasika	(Australia) Duje Markovina (Australia) Moerani Bouzige (Australia) Scott Jones (Australia) Li Tu
March 2	Faro, Portugal; Hard; M25; Singles and doubles draws	(Canada) Justin Boulais; 7–5, 6–4	(Portugal) João Domingues	(United Kingdom) Liam Broady (Italy) Michele Ribecai	(Switzerland) Johan Nikles (Portugal) Tiago Torres (Portugal) Tiago Cação (Italy) Federico Arnaboldi
March 2	Faro, Portugal; Hard; M25; Singles and doubles draws	(Canada) Justin Boulais (Portugal) Francisco Rocha; 5–7, 6–2, [10–3]	(Portugal) Hugo Maia (Portugal) Guilherme Valdoleiros	(United Kingdom) Liam Broady (Italy) Michele Ribecai	(Switzerland) Johan Nikles (Portugal) Tiago Torres (Portugal) Tiago Cação (Italy) Federico Arnaboldi
March 2	Trimbach, Switzerland; Carpet (i); M25; Singles and doubles draws	(Switzerland) Dominic Stricker; 6–7^{(5–7)}, 6–3, 6–4	(Germany) Daniel Masur	(United Kingdom) Hamish Stewart (Switzerland) Mika Brunold	(Italy) Filippo Romano (Germany) Max Hans Rehberg (Germany) Mika Petkovic (Italy) Andrea Guerrieri
March 2	Trimbach, Switzerland; Carpet (i); M25; Singles and doubles draws	(Germany) Daniel Masur (United Kingdom) Hamish Stewart; 6–4, 7–6^{(7–3)}	(Switzerland) Gian Gruenig (Switzerland) Jeffrey von der Schulenburg	(United Kingdom) Hamish Stewart (Switzerland) Mika Brunold	(Italy) Filippo Romano (Germany) Max Hans Rehberg (Germany) Mika Petkovic (Italy) Andrea Guerrieri
March 2	Yerba Buena, Argentina; Clay; M25; Singles and doubles draws	(Germany) Diego Dedura; 6–3, 7–6^{(7–3)}	(Argentina) Luciano Emanuel Ambrogi	(Argentina) Lorenzo Joaquín Rodríguez (Argentina) Máximo Zeitune	(Argentina) Santiago Rodríguez Taverna (Chile) Bastián Malla (Argentina) Juan Estévez (Argentina) Carlos María Zárate
March 2	Yerba Buena, Argentina; Clay; M25; Singles and doubles draws	(Argentina) Tomás Martinez (Argentina) Tadeo Meneo; 6–2, 6–4	(Brazil) Bruno Fernandez (Argentina) Máximo Zeitune	(Argentina) Lorenzo Joaquín Rodríguez (Argentina) Máximo Zeitune	(Argentina) Santiago Rodríguez Taverna (Chile) Bastián Malla (Argentina) Juan Estévez (Argentina) Carlos María Zárate
March 2	Maanshan, China; Hard (i); M15; Singles and doubles draws	(Japan) Koki Matsuda; 7–6^{(7–5)}, 6–2	(United States) Andre Ilagan	(Thailand) Pawit Sornlaksup (Indonesia) Muhammad Rifqi Fitriadi	(Japan) Akira Santillan (Thailand) Kasidit Samrej (Chinese Taipei) Wang Kai-i (Germany) Jeremy Schifris
March 2	Maanshan, China; Hard (i); M15; Singles and doubles draws	(United States) Andre Ilagan (United States) Evan Zhu; 6–3, 6–3	(Chinese Taipei) Hsieh Cheng-peng (South Korea) Park Ui-sung	(Thailand) Pawit Sornlaksup (Indonesia) Muhammad Rifqi Fitriadi	(Japan) Akira Santillan (Thailand) Kasidit Samrej (Chinese Taipei) Wang Kai-i (Germany) Jeremy Schifris
March 2	Torelló, Spain; Hard; M15; Singles and doubles draws	(Spain) John Echeverría; 3–6, 6–3, 6–4	(United Kingdom) Emile Hudd	(Bulgaria) Leonid Sheyngezikht (United Kingdom) Millen Hurrion	(Czech Republic) Dominik Palán (Norway) Johan Oscar Lien (Morocco) Younes Lalami (Turkey) Kuzey Çekirge
March 2	Torelló, Spain; Hard; M15; Singles and doubles draws	(Spain) Samuel de Felipe Garcia (Spain) John Echeverría; Walkover	(Italy) Alessandro Battiston (Italy) Andrea Colombo	(Bulgaria) Leonid Sheyngezikht (United Kingdom) Millen Hurrion	(Czech Republic) Dominik Palán (Norway) Johan Oscar Lien (Morocco) Younes Lalami (Turkey) Kuzey Çekirge
March 2	Poitiers, France; Hard (i); M15; Singles and doubles draws	(United Kingdom) Anton Matusevich; 7–6^{(10–8)}, 6–3	(Italy) Leonardo Rossi	(France) Yanis Ghazouani Durand (France) Maxence Beauge	(France) Raphael Perot (France) Ferdinand Livet Novkirichka (France) Liam Branger (France) Mathys Domenc
March 2	Poitiers, France; Hard (i); M15; Singles and doubles draws	(France) Marko Maric (Serbia) Tadija Radovanović; 3–6, 7–6^{(7–3)}, [10–6]	(France) Romain Andres (France) Mickael Kaouk	(France) Yanis Ghazouani Durand (France) Maxence Beauge	(France) Raphael Perot (France) Ferdinand Livet Novkirichka (France) Liam Branger (France) Mathys Domenc
March 2	Heraklion, Greece; Hard; M15; Singles and doubles draws	(Italy) Lorenzo Angelini; 6–2, 6–1	(Poland) Tomasz Berkieta	(United States) Matt Kuhar (United States) Ryan Colby	(Greece) Dimitris Sakellaridis (Switzerland) Luca Staeheli (Czech Republic) Daniel Siniakov (Italy) Federico Iannaccone
March 2	Heraklion, Greece; Hard; M15; Singles and doubles draws	(Spain) Izan Almazán Valiente (Italy) Lorenzo Angelini; 4–6, 6–2, [10–7]	(United States) Ryan Colby (Sweden) William Rejchtman Vinciguerra	(United States) Matt Kuhar (United States) Ryan Colby	(Greece) Dimitris Sakellaridis (Switzerland) Luca Staeheli (Czech Republic) Daniel Siniakov (Italy) Federico Iannaccone
March 2	Sharm El Sheikh, Egypt; Hard; M15; Singles and doubles draws	(Egypt) Fares Zakaria; 0–6, 6–3, 7–5	Semen Pankin	(Slovakia) Michal Krajčí (Ukraine) Yurii Dzhavakian	(Italy) Federico Bondioli (Turkey) Tuncay Duran (Egypt) Michael Bassem Sobhy (Serbia) Ognjen Milić
March 2	Sharm El Sheikh, Egypt; Hard; M15; Singles and doubles draws	(Italy) Enrico Baldisserri (Italy) Gabriele Volpi; 6–3, 7–5	(United Kingdom) James Markiewicz (Germany) Tom Zeuch	(Slovakia) Michal Krajčí (Ukraine) Yurii Dzhavakian	(Italy) Federico Bondioli (Turkey) Tuncay Duran (Egypt) Michael Bassem Sobhy (Serbia) Ognjen Milić
March 2	Monastir, Tunisia; Hard; M15; Singles and doubles draws	(Slovakia) Miloš Karol; 6–3, 7–5	(France) Leo Raquillet	(Morocco) Karim Bennani (Slovenia) Filip Jeff Planinšek	(France) Alexandre Aubriot (Italy) Michele Mecarelli (Czech Republic) Jakub Nicod (Germany) Yannik Kelm
March 2	Monastir, Tunisia; Hard; M15; Singles and doubles draws	(New Zealand) Isaac Becroft (New Zealand) Anton Shepp; 6–3, 3–6, [11–9]	(Chinese Taipei) Lu Chen-yu (United States) Avi Shugar	(Morocco) Karim Bennani (Slovenia) Filip Jeff Planinšek	(France) Alexandre Aubriot (Italy) Michele Mecarelli (Czech Republic) Jakub Nicod (Germany) Yannik Kelm
March 2	Sherbrooke, Canada; Hard (i); M15; Singles and doubles draws	(Netherlands) Daniel de Jonge; 7–6^{(7–5)}, 6–3	(United States) Gavin Young	(United States) Quinn Vandecasteele (United States) Daniil Kakhniuk	(United States) Drew Van Orderlain (Morocco) Taha Baadi (United Kingdom) Oliver Okonkwo (United States) Strong Kirchheimer
March 2	Sherbrooke, Canada; Hard (i); M15; Singles and doubles draws	(United Kingdom) Oliver Okonkwo (United States) Gavin Young; 6–3, 7–5	(New Zealand) Reece Falck (Canada) Nicaise Muamba	(United States) Quinn Vandecasteele (United States) Daniil Kakhniuk	(United States) Drew Van Orderlain (Morocco) Taha Baadi (United Kingdom) Oliver Okonkwo (United States) Strong Kirchheimer
March 9	Timaru, New Zealand; Hard; M25; Singles and doubles draws	(Australia) Enzo Aguiard; 6–3, 6–7^{(5–7)}, 6–0	(Australia) Tai Sach	(Germany) Jamie Mackenzie (Chinese Taipei) Hsu Yu-hsiou	(Australia) Jason Kubler (Australia) Omar Jasika (Australia) Moerani Bouzige (Australia) Stefan Vujic
March 9	Timaru, New Zealand; Hard; M25; Singles and doubles draws	(Australia) Ethan Cook (Australia) Tai Sach; 3–6, 6–3, [10–6]	(Australia) Jesse Delaney (Japan) Yamato Sueoka	(Germany) Jamie Mackenzie (Chinese Taipei) Hsu Yu-hsiou	(Australia) Jason Kubler (Australia) Omar Jasika (Australia) Moerani Bouzige (Australia) Stefan Vujic
March 9	Kolkata, India; Hard; M25; Singles and doubles draws	(Australia) Philip Sekulic; 6–1, 7–6^{(7–1)}	(India) Karan Singh	(Sweden) Leo Borg (India) Sidharth Rawat	(Switzerland) Luca Castelnuovo (India) Manish Sureshkumar (India) Abhinav Sanjeev Shanmugam (Ukraine) Yurii Dzhavakian
March 9	Kolkata, India; Hard; M25; Singles and doubles draws	(India) Madhwin Kamath (India) Atharva Sharma; 6–4, 6–4	(India) Kabir Hans (India) Maan Kesharwani	(Sweden) Leo Borg (India) Sidharth Rawat	(Switzerland) Luca Castelnuovo (India) Manish Sureshkumar (India) Abhinav Sanjeev Shanmugam (Ukraine) Yurii Dzhavakian
March 9	Créteil, France; Hard (i); M25; Singles and doubles draws	(Germany) Marvin Möller; 6–3, 6–2	(United Kingdom) Charles Broom	(United Kingdom) Anton Matusevich (France) Arthur Nagel	(France) Maé Malige (Syria) Hazem Naw (United Kingdom) Hamish Stewart (Switzerland) Dominic Stricker
March 9	Créteil, France; Hard (i); M25; Singles and doubles draws	(United Kingdom) Charles Broom (Germany) Daniel Masur; 6–2, 6–4	(Germany) Tim Rühl (Germany) Kai Wehnelt	(United Kingdom) Anton Matusevich (France) Arthur Nagel	(France) Maé Malige (Syria) Hazem Naw (United Kingdom) Hamish Stewart (Switzerland) Dominic Stricker
March 9	Maanshan, China; Hard (i); M15; Singles and doubles draws	(China) Cui Jie; 6–7^{(4–7)}, 6–2, 6–4	(United States) Andre Ilagan	(China) Xiao Linang (Australia) Matthew Dellavedova	(France) Dorian Tremblay; Maxim Zhukov (Thailand) Kasidit Samrej (Poland) Filip Peliwo
March 9	Maanshan, China; Hard (i); M15; Singles and doubles draws	Egor Agafonov; Maxim Zhukov; 6–4, 6–2	(China) Sun Qian (China) Tang Sheng	(China) Xiao Linang (Australia) Matthew Dellavedova	(France) Dorian Tremblay; Maxim Zhukov (Thailand) Kasidit Samrej (Poland) Filip Peliwo
March 9	Hinode, Japan; Hard; M15; Singles and doubles draws	(United States) Hunter Heck; 6–3, 6–4	(United States) Noah Zamora	(Japan) Masamichi Imamura (Japan) Yuta Kikuchi	(Japan) Koki Matsuda (Chinese Taipei) Lee Kuan-yi (Japan) Leo Vithoontien (Japan) Ryo Tabata
March 9	Hinode, Japan; Hard; M15; Singles and doubles draws	(Chinese Taipei) Jason Jung (Japan) Kaito Uesugi; 5–7, 7–5, [10–7]	(Japan) Shinji Hazawa (Japan) Masamichi Imamura	(Japan) Masamichi Imamura (Japan) Yuta Kikuchi	(Japan) Koki Matsuda (Chinese Taipei) Lee Kuan-yi (Japan) Leo Vithoontien (Japan) Ryo Tabata
March 9	Poreč, Croatia; Clay; M15; Singles and doubles draws	(Croatia) Mili Poljičak; 6–3, 6–4	(Italy) Tommaso Compagnucci	(Switzerland) Gian Luca Tanner (Ukraine) Viacheslav Bielinskyi	(Serbia) Kristijan Juhas (Italy) Iannis Miletich (France) Maxime Chazal (Italy) Lorenzo Berto
March 9	Poreč, Croatia; Clay; M15; Singles and doubles draws	(Germany) Marc Majdandzic (Croatia) Josip Šimundža; 6–3, 6–4	(Bosnia and Herzegovina) Andrej Nedić (Serbia) Stefan Popović	(Switzerland) Gian Luca Tanner (Ukraine) Viacheslav Bielinskyi	(Serbia) Kristijan Juhas (Italy) Iannis Miletich (France) Maxime Chazal (Italy) Lorenzo Berto
March 9	Heraklion, Greece; Hard; M15; Singles and doubles draws	(Romania) Radu Mihai Papoe; 6–2, 6–3	(Israel) Amit Vales	(Netherlands) Fons van Sambeek; Svyatoslav Gulin	(Italy) Giulio Perego (Sweden) William Rejchtman Vinciguerra (Spain) Izan Almazán Valiente (Ukraine) Volodymyr Iakubenko
March 9	Heraklion, Greece; Hard; M15; Singles and doubles draws	(United States) Alex Jones (United States) Miles Jones; 7–6^{(7–5)}, 6–3	(Czech Republic) Dominik Reček (Czech Republic) Daniel Siniakov	(Netherlands) Fons van Sambeek; Svyatoslav Gulin	(Italy) Giulio Perego (Sweden) William Rejchtman Vinciguerra (Spain) Izan Almazán Valiente (Ukraine) Volodymyr Iakubenko
March 9	Sharm El Sheikh, Egypt; Hard; M15; Singles and doubles draws	(Italy) Federico Bondioli; 6–2, 6–4	(Slovakia) Michal Krajčí	Semen Pankin (Italy) Alessandro Pecci	(Senegal) Seydina André (Italy) Filippo Mazzola (Italy) Samuel Vincent Ruggeri (Ukraine) Nikita Bilozertsev
March 9	Sharm El Sheikh, Egypt; Hard; M15; Singles and doubles draws	(Thailand) Wishaya Trongcharoenchaikul (South Africa) Kris van Wyk; 6–7^{(0–7)}, 6–3, [10–8]	(Egypt) Karim Ibrahim (Ukraine) Volodymyr Uzhylovskyi	Semen Pankin (Italy) Alessandro Pecci	(Senegal) Seydina André (Italy) Filippo Mazzola (Italy) Samuel Vincent Ruggeri (Ukraine) Nikita Bilozertsev
March 9	Monastir, Tunisia; Hard; M15; Singles and doubles draws	(New Zealand) Anton Shepp; 6–3, 7–6^{(9–7)}	(Kazakhstan) Amir Omarkhanov	(Slovakia) Miloš Karol (Germany) Luca Wiedenmann	(Switzerland) Patrick Schoen (Sweden) Nikola Slavic (Iran) Kasra Rahmani (New Zealand) Isaac Becroft
March 9	Monastir, Tunisia; Hard; M15; Singles and doubles draws	(New Zealand) Isaac Becroft (New Zealand) Anton Shepp; 6–4, 6–2	(Morocco) Younes Lalami (Belgium) Martin van der Meerschen	(Slovakia) Miloš Karol (Germany) Luca Wiedenmann	(Switzerland) Patrick Schoen (Sweden) Nikola Slavic (Iran) Kasra Rahmani (New Zealand) Isaac Becroft
March 9	Montreal, Canada; Hard (i); M15; Singles and doubles draws	(Netherlands) Mees Röttgering; 6–7^{(3–7)}, 6–1, 6–4	(United States) Andrew Fenty	(Netherlands) Daniel de Jonge (Poland) Kacper Szymkowiak	(United States) Tyler Zink (Canada) Alvin Nicholas Tudorica (United States) Strong Kirchheimer (Canada) Dan Martin
March 9	Montreal, Canada; Hard (i); M15; Singles and doubles draws	(New Zealand) Reece Falck (United States) Billy Suarez; 7–5, 7–5	(United States) Reid Jarvis (United States) Jamie Vance	(Netherlands) Daniel de Jonge (Poland) Kacper Szymkowiak	(United States) Tyler Zink (Canada) Alvin Nicholas Tudorica (United States) Strong Kirchheimer (Canada) Dan Martin
March 9	La Plata, Argentina; Clay; M15; Singles and doubles draws	(Argentina) Juan Estévez; 7–5, 6–4	(Brazil) Bruno Fernandez	(Argentina) Lucio Ratti (Argentina) Lorenzo Joaquín Rodríguez	(Argentina) Santiago de la Fuente (Argentina) Máximo Zeitune (Argentina) Carlos María Zárate (Argentina) Valerio Aboian
March 9	La Plata, Argentina; Clay; M15; Singles and doubles draws	(Argentina) Tadeo Meneo (Argentina) Manuel Mouilleron Salvo; 6–7^{(7–9)}, 6–4, [10–6]	(Argentina) Julián Cúndom (Argentina) Alejo Lorenzo Lingua Lavallén	(Argentina) Lucio Ratti (Argentina) Lorenzo Joaquín Rodríguez	(Argentina) Santiago de la Fuente (Argentina) Máximo Zeitune (Argentina) Carlos María Zárate (Argentina) Valerio Aboian
March 16	Mumbai, India; Hard; M25; Singles and doubles draws	(Australia) Philip Sekulic; 6–1, 6–2	(India) Sidharth Rawat	(France) Florent Bax (Sweden) Leo Borg	(India) Mukund Sasikumar (Italy) Alexandr Binda; Timofei Derepasko (Switzerland) Luca Castelnuovo
March 16	Mumbai, India; Hard; M25; Singles and doubles draws	(India) Jeevan Nedunchezhiyan (India) Ramkumar Ramanathan; 6–3, 6–4	(Sweden) Leo Borg (Ukraine) Yurii Dzhavakian	(France) Florent Bax (Sweden) Leo Borg	(India) Mukund Sasikumar (Italy) Alexandr Binda; Timofei Derepasko (Switzerland) Luca Castelnuovo
March 16	Badalona, Spain; Clay; M25; Singles and doubles draws	(Spain) Iñaki Montes de la Torre; 6–4, 6–2	(Italy) Jacopo Vasamì	(Switzerland) Kilian Feldbausch (Poland) Maks Kaśnikowski	(France) Mathys Erhard (Morocco) Younes Lalami (Spain) Oriol Roca Batalla (Spain) Carles Córdoba
March 16	Badalona, Spain; Clay; M25; Singles and doubles draws	(Netherlands) Michiel de Krom (Netherlands) Ryan Nijboer; 7–6^{(8–6)}, 6–4	Yaroslav Demin (Bulgaria) Iliyan Radulov	(Switzerland) Kilian Feldbausch (Poland) Maks Kaśnikowski	(France) Mathys Erhard (Morocco) Younes Lalami (Spain) Oriol Roca Batalla (Spain) Carles Córdoba
March 16	Toulouse–Balma, France; Hard (i); M25; Singles and doubles draws	(Belgium) Gauthier Onclin; 6–3, 6–2	(Norway) Viktor Durasovic	(France) Matteo Martineau (France) Raphael Perot	(France) Antoine Ghibaudo (Switzerland) Mika Brunold (France) Tom Paris (France) Yanis Ghazouani Durand
March 16	Toulouse–Balma, France; Hard (i); M25; Singles and doubles draws	(France) Maxence Beauge (France) Arthur Nagel; 6–2, 6–2	(United States) Zachary Fuchs (United Kingdom) James Hopper	(France) Matteo Martineau (France) Raphael Perot	(France) Antoine Ghibaudo (Switzerland) Mika Brunold (France) Tom Paris (France) Yanis Ghazouani Durand
March 16	Heraklion, Greece; Hard; M25; Singles and doubles draws	(United States) Stefan Dostanic; 6–3, 3–6, [10–6]	(Belgium) Buvaysar Gadamauri	(United Kingdom) Henry Searle (Bulgaria) Petr Nesterov	(France) Robin Bertrand (Italy) Federico Iannaccone (United Kingdom) Giles Hussey (South Africa) Philip Henning
March 16	Heraklion, Greece; Hard; M25; Singles and doubles draws	Doubles final between (Cyprus) Eleftherios Neos / (Greece) Petros Tsitsipas and (Belgium) Buvaysar Gadamauri / (United Kingdom) Ewen Lumsden was cancelled due to ongoing poor weather		(United Kingdom) Henry Searle (Bulgaria) Petr Nesterov	(France) Robin Bertrand (Italy) Federico Iannaccone (United Kingdom) Giles Hussey (South Africa) Philip Henning
March 16	Bakersfield, United States; Hard; M25; Singles and doubles draws	(United States) Michael Antonius; 7–6^{(7–3)}, 6–2	(United States) Andrew Fenty	(United States) Gianluca Brunkow (Poland) Olaf Pieczkowski	(United States) Daniil Kakhniuk (Serbia) Aleksa Ćirić (Serbia) Branko Đurić (United States) Dominique Rolland
March 16	Bakersfield, United States; Hard; M25; Singles and doubles draws	(United States) Michael Antonius (United States) Gus Grumet; Walkover	(Germany) Maximilian Homberg (United States) Christopher Papa	(United States) Gianluca Brunkow (Poland) Olaf Pieczkowski	(United States) Daniil Kakhniuk (Serbia) Aleksa Ćirić (Serbia) Branko Đurić (United States) Dominique Rolland
March 16	Wodonga, Australia; Grass; M15; Singles and doubles draws	(Northern Mariana Islands) Colin Sinclair; 6–3, 6–2	(Australia) Cruz Hewitt	(Australia) James McCabe (Australia) Pavle Marinkov	(Australia) Joshua Charlton (Australia) Jesse Delaney (Australia) Scott Jones (Australia) Arjun Mehrotra
March 16	Wodonga, Australia; Grass; M15; Singles and doubles draws	(Australia) Ty Host (Australia) Stefan Vujic; 4–6, 6–3, [10–8]	(Australia) Ymerali Ibraimi (Australia) Daniel Jovanovski	(Australia) James McCabe (Australia) Pavle Marinkov	(Australia) Joshua Charlton (Australia) Jesse Delaney (Australia) Scott Jones (Australia) Arjun Mehrotra
March 16	Nishitokyo, Japan; Hard; M15; Singles and doubles draws	(Denmark) Carl Emil Overbeck; 6–3, 6–2	(United States) Hunter Heck	(United Kingdom) Emile Hudd (Japan) James Trotter	(Japan) Ryo Tabata (Japan) Naoki Nakagawa (Japan) Taisei Ichikawa (Japan) Sora Fukuda
March 16	Nishitokyo, Japan; Hard; M15; Singles and doubles draws	(Japan) Ryuki Matsuda (Japan) Hikaru Shiraishi; 6–2, 1–6, [10–5]	(Japan) Shinji Hazawa (Japan) Naoki Tajima	(United Kingdom) Emile Hudd (Japan) James Trotter	(Japan) Ryo Tabata (Japan) Naoki Nakagawa (Japan) Taisei Ichikawa (Japan) Sora Fukuda
March 16	Maanshan, China; Hard (i); M15; Singles and doubles draws	(Latvia) Kārlis Ozoliņš; 6–3, 6–1	Maxim Zhukov	Evgeny Philippov (China) Te Rigele	(Australia) Chase Ferguson (Indonesia) Muhammad Rifqi Fitriadi (Poland) Filip Peliwo (China) Zhang Tianhui
March 16	Maanshan, China; Hard (i); M15; Singles and doubles draws	(Australia) Chase Ferguson (Chinese Taipei) Hsieh Cheng-peng; 6–1, 6–4	(Thailand) Thantub Suksumrarn (United States) Michael Zhu	Evgeny Philippov (China) Te Rigele	(Australia) Chase Ferguson (Indonesia) Muhammad Rifqi Fitriadi (Poland) Filip Peliwo (China) Zhang Tianhui
March 16	Foggia, Italy; Clay; M15; Singles and doubles draws	(Czech Republic) Hynek Bartoň; 6–7^{(11–13)}, 6–4, 6–4	(Italy) Francesco Forti	(Italy) Carlo Alberto Caniato (Republic of Ireland) Peter Buldorini	(Italy) Denis Constantin Spiridon (Germany) Stefan Seifert (Italy) Lorenzo Rottoli (Italy) Pietro Marino
March 16	Foggia, Italy; Clay; M15; Singles and doubles draws	(Italy) Jacopo Bilardo (Italy) Alessandro Ingarao; 7–6^{(7–4)}, 6–4	(Italy) Riccardo Perin (Italy) Lorenzo Rottoli	(Italy) Carlo Alberto Caniato (Republic of Ireland) Peter Buldorini	(Italy) Denis Constantin Spiridon (Germany) Stefan Seifert (Italy) Lorenzo Rottoli (Italy) Pietro Marino
March 16	Rovinj, Croatia; Clay; M15; Singles and doubles draws	Kirill Kivattsev; 6–2, 6–3	(Italy) Tommaso Compagnucci	(Netherlands) Elgin Khoeblal (Italy) Juan Cruz Martin Manzano	(Germany) Tom Gentzsch (Italy) Giovanni Oradini (Italy) Pietro Scomparin (Ukraine) Viacheslav Bielinskyi
March 16	Rovinj, Croatia; Clay; M15; Singles and doubles draws	(Italy) Tommaso Compagnucci (Germany) Adrian Oetzbach; 7–6^{(7–4)}, 4–6, [10–6]	(Croatia) Karlo Kajin (Croatia) Deni Žmak	(Netherlands) Elgin Khoeblal (Italy) Juan Cruz Martin Manzano	(Germany) Tom Gentzsch (Italy) Giovanni Oradini (Italy) Pietro Scomparin (Ukraine) Viacheslav Bielinskyi
March 16	Sharm El Sheikh, Egypt; Hard; M15; Singles and doubles draws	(Italy) Alessandro Pecci; 6–1, 6–3	(Egypt) Fares Zakaria	(Italy) Samuel Vincent Ruggeri (Egypt) Michael Bassem Sobhy	(Latvia) Robert Strombachs; Saveliy Ivanov (Georgia (country)) Aleksandre Bakshi (Netherlands) Pieter De Lange
March 16	Sharm El Sheikh, Egypt; Hard; M15; Singles and doubles draws	(Lithuania) Justas Trainauskas (Lithuania) Pijus Vaitiekūnas; 4–6, 6–2, [10–2]	(Latvia) Robert Strombachs (Ukraine) Volodymyr Uzhylovskyi	(Italy) Samuel Vincent Ruggeri (Egypt) Michael Bassem Sobhy	(Latvia) Robert Strombachs; Saveliy Ivanov (Georgia (country)) Aleksandre Bakshi (Netherlands) Pieter De Lange
March 16	Monastir, Tunisia; Hard; M15; Singles and doubles draws	(Kazakhstan) Amir Omarkhanov; 7–5, 1–6, 7–5	(Turkey) Mert Alkaya	(Iran) Kasra Rahmani (Germany) Luca Wiedenmann	(United Kingdom) Millen Hurrion (Spain) John Echeverría (Portugal) Tiago Torres (United Kingdom) Marcus Walters
March 16	Monastir, Tunisia; Hard; M15; Singles and doubles draws	(Denmark) Oskar Brostrøm Poulsen (Sweden) Nikola Slavic; 6–1, 6–7^{(3–7)}, [10–8]	(Luxembourg) Louis Van Herck (Germany) Marlon Vankan	(Iran) Kasra Rahmani (Germany) Luca Wiedenmann	(United Kingdom) Millen Hurrion (Spain) John Echeverría (Portugal) Tiago Torres (United Kingdom) Marcus Walters
March 16	Punta del Este, Uruguay; Clay; M15; Singles and doubles draws	(Argentina) Lucio Ratti; 4–6, 6–4, 6–1	(Argentina) Ignacio Monzón	(Argentina) Fernando Cavallo (Brazil) Nicolas Zanellato	(Argentina) Juan Ignacio Gallego (Brazil) Lucca Pinto (Argentina) Tomas Martinez (United States) Ryan Fishback
March 16	Punta del Este, Uruguay; Clay; M15; Singles and doubles draws	(Argentina) Juan Bautista Otegui (Argentina) Fermín Tenti; 6–4, 7–5	(Argentina) Mateo Berta (Argentina) Lucio Ratti	(Argentina) Fernando Cavallo (Brazil) Nicolas Zanellato	(Argentina) Juan Ignacio Gallego (Brazil) Lucca Pinto (Argentina) Tomas Martinez (United States) Ryan Fishback
March 23	Tarragona, Spain; Clay; M25; Singles and doubles draw	(Bulgaria) Ivan Ivanov; 6–3, 6–2	(Spain) Àlex Martí Pujolràs	(Poland) Marcel Zieliński; Pavel Lagutin	(Germany) Max Schönhaus (Spain) Oriol Roca Batalla (France) César Bouchelaghem (Spain) Oscar José Gutiérrez
March 23	Tarragona, Spain; Clay; M25; Singles and doubles draw	(Spain) Sergio Callejón Hernando (Spain) Pedro Vives Marcos; 6–3, 6–3	(France) Sean Cuenin (France) Mathys Erhard	(Poland) Marcel Zieliński; Pavel Lagutin	(Germany) Max Schönhaus (Spain) Oriol Roca Batalla (France) César Bouchelaghem (Spain) Oscar José Gutiérrez
March 23	Saint-Dizier, France; Hard (i); M25; Singles and doubles draws	(Switzerland) Dominic Stricker; 6–3, 7–6^{(7–2)}	(Austria) Sebastian Sorger	(Belgium) Gauthier Onclin (France) Loann Massard	(Norway) Viktor Durasovic (France) Yanis Ghazouani Durand (Germany) Marvin Möller (France) Leo Lagarrigue
March 23	Saint-Dizier, France; Hard (i); M25; Singles and doubles draws	(United Kingdom) James Beaven (Italy) Gabriele Volpi; 7–6^{(13–11)}, 6–4	(France) Pierre Antoine Faut (France) Elijah Sanogo	(Belgium) Gauthier Onclin (France) Loann Massard	(Norway) Viktor Durasovic (France) Yanis Ghazouani Durand (Germany) Marvin Möller (France) Leo Lagarrigue
March 23	Las Vegas, United States; Hard; M25; Singles and doubles draws	(Jamaica) Blaise Bicknell; 6–3, 6–2	(United States) Ronit Karki	(United States) Tanishk Konduri (Slovenia) Bor Artnak	(United States) Andrew Johnson (United States) Kaylan Bigun (United States) Aidan Mayo (United States) Daniel Milavsky
March 23	Las Vegas, United States; Hard; M25; Singles and doubles draws	(United Kingdom) Oliver Okonkwo (United States) Billy Suarez; 6–4, 6–3	(United States) Daniel Milavsky (United States) Jack Vance	(United States) Tanishk Konduri (Slovenia) Bor Artnak	(United States) Andrew Johnson (United States) Kaylan Bigun (United States) Aidan Mayo (United States) Daniel Milavsky
March 23	Swan Hill, Australia; Grass; M15; Singles and doubles draws	(Australia) Pavle Marinkov; 7–6^{(7–2)}, 6–2	(Northern Mariana Islands) Colin Sinclair	(Australia) Cruz Hewitt (Australia) Scott Jones	(Australia) Harrison Satara (Australia) Joshua Charlton (Australia) Oliver Anderson (Australia) Matt Hulme
March 23	Swan Hill, Australia; Grass; M15; Singles and doubles draws	(Australia) Jesse Delaney (Australia) Matt Hulme; 6–4, 7–6^{(7–4)}	(Australia) Joshua Charlton (Northern Mariana Islands) Colin Sinclair	(Australia) Cruz Hewitt (Australia) Scott Jones	(Australia) Harrison Satara (Australia) Joshua Charlton (Australia) Oliver Anderson (Australia) Matt Hulme
March 23	Tsukuba, Japan; Hard; M15; Singles and doubles draws	(United Kingdom) Emile Hudd; 6–4, 4–6, 6–0	(Japan) Shinji Hazawa	(United States) Evan Zhu (Malaysia) Mitsuki Wei Kang Leong	(Japan) Hikaru Shiraishi (United States) Noah Zamora (Japan) Yuta Tomida (United States) Hunter Heck
March 23	Tsukuba, Japan; Hard; M15; Singles and doubles draws	(Japan) Sora Fukuda (Japan) Leo Vithoontien; 2–6, 6–3, [10–8]	(Japan) Taisei Ichikawa (Japan) Ryotaro Taguchi	(United States) Evan Zhu (Malaysia) Mitsuki Wei Kang Leong	(Japan) Hikaru Shiraishi (United States) Noah Zamora (Japan) Yuta Tomida (United States) Hunter Heck
March 23	Maanshan, China; Hard (i); M15; Singles and doubles draws	(Australia) Matthew Dellavedova; 6–1, 6–4	Maxim Zhukov	Egor Pleshivtsev (Indonesia) Muhammad Rifqi Fitriadi	(China) Sun Qian (Armenia) Daniil Sarksian (China) Liu Hanyi (France) Julien De Cuyper
March 23	Maanshan, China; Hard (i); M15; Singles and doubles draws	(Uzbekistan) Sergey Fomin (Uzbekistan) Maxim Shin; 5–7, 6–4, [10–5]	(China) Chen Xianfeng (China) Wang Aoran	Egor Pleshivtsev (Indonesia) Muhammad Rifqi Fitriadi	(China) Sun Qian (Armenia) Daniil Sarksian (China) Liu Hanyi (France) Julien De Cuyper
March 23	Ahmedabad, India; Hard; M15; Singles and doubles draws	(Sweden) Leo Borg; 7–6^{(11–9)}, 6–1	(India) Sidharth Rawat	(Italy) Alexandr Binda (India) Arjun Rathi	(Kazakhstan) Grigoriy Lomakin (India) Digvijaypratap Singh (India) Manish Sureshkumar (India) Mukund Sasikumar
March 23	Ahmedabad, India; Hard; M15; Singles and doubles draws	(India) Abhinav Sanjeev Shanmugam (India) Manish Sureshkumar; 6–2, 6–3	(India) Kabir Hans (India) Maan Kesharwani	(Italy) Alexandr Binda (India) Arjun Rathi	(Kazakhstan) Grigoriy Lomakin (India) Digvijaypratap Singh (India) Manish Sureshkumar (India) Mukund Sasikumar
March 23	Altamura, Italy; Hard (i); M15; Singles and doubles draws	(France) Arthur Nagel; 6–3, 6–2	(Czech Republic) Matthew William Donald	(Italy) Leonardo Rossi (Italy) Lorenzo Bocchi	(Italy) Alessandro Pecci (Italy) Massimo Giunta (Switzerland) Nicolás Parizzia (Italy) Michele Mecarelli
March 23	Altamura, Italy; Hard (i); M15; Singles and doubles draws	(United Kingdom) James Markiewicz (Germany) Tom Zeuch; 6–7^{(4–7)}, 6–4, [12–10]	(Switzerland) Nicolás Parizzia (Switzerland) Flynn Thomas	(Italy) Leonardo Rossi (Italy) Lorenzo Bocchi	(Italy) Alessandro Pecci (Italy) Massimo Giunta (Switzerland) Nicolás Parizzia (Italy) Michele Mecarelli
March 23	Opatija, Croatia; Clay; M15; Singles and doubles draws	(Ukraine) Viacheslav Bielinskyi; 7–5, 6–4	(Italy) Gabriele Bosio	(Slovenia) Aljaz Jeran (Italy) Andrea Fiorentini	(Portugal) Francisco Rocha (Croatia) Karlo Kajin (France) Pierre Delage (Hungary) Matyas Fuele
March 23	Opatija, Croatia; Clay; M15; Singles and doubles draws	(Bosnia and Herzegovina) Ivan Biletić (Croatia) Karlo Kajin; 6–1, 7–6^{(7–5)}	(Serbia) Kristijan Juhas (Serbia) Marko Miladinović	(Slovenia) Aljaz Jeran (Italy) Andrea Fiorentini	(Portugal) Francisco Rocha (Croatia) Karlo Kajin (France) Pierre Delage (Hungary) Matyas Fuele
March 23	Heraklion, Greece; Hard; M15; Singles and doubles draws	(United Kingdom) Henry Searle; 6–2, 6–2	(Czech Republic) Jan Kumstát	(France) Robin Bertrand (Switzerland) Luca Staeheli	(Czech Republic) Jakub Filip (Italy) Fausto Tabacco (Greece) Ioannis Kountourakis (United States) Miles Jones
March 23	Heraklion, Greece; Hard; M15; Singles and doubles draws	(Czech Republic) Jan Kumstát (Czech Republic) Štěpán Pecák; 3–6, 7–5, [10–7]	(United States) Alex Jones (United States) Miles Jones	(France) Robin Bertrand (Switzerland) Luca Staeheli	(Czech Republic) Jakub Filip (Italy) Fausto Tabacco (Greece) Ioannis Kountourakis (United States) Miles Jones
March 23	Sharm El Sheikh, Egypt; Hard; M15; Singles and doubles draws	(Czech Republic) Marek Gengel; 6–4, 6–7^{(4–7)}, 6–2	(Egypt) Amr Elsayed	(Ukraine) Yurii Dzhavakian (Latvia) Robert Strombachs	(Germany) Sydney Zick (Australia) Jacob Bradshaw (Turkey) Kerem Yılmaz (Netherlands) Pieter De Lange
March 23	Sharm El Sheikh, Egypt; Hard; M15; Singles and doubles draws	(Netherlands) Pieter De Lange (Germany) Sydney Zick; 6–3, 2–6, [10–8]	(Latvia) Robert Strombachs (Ukraine) Volodymyr Uzhylovskyi	(Ukraine) Yurii Dzhavakian (Latvia) Robert Strombachs	(Germany) Sydney Zick (Australia) Jacob Bradshaw (Turkey) Kerem Yılmaz (Netherlands) Pieter De Lange
March 23	Monastir, Tunisia; Hard; M15; Singles and doubles draws	(United Kingdom) Millen Hurrion; 2–6, 6–3, 6–2	(Hungary) Péter Makk	(Spain) John Echeverría (Switzerland) Patrick Schoen	(Turkey) Mert Alkaya (Denmark) Oskar Brostrøm Poulsen (Iran) Kasra Rahmani (France) Cyril Vandermeersch
March 23	Monastir, Tunisia; Hard; M15; Singles and doubles draws	(Denmark) Oskar Brostrøm Poulsen (Sweden) Nikola Slavic; 6–3, 7–6^{(8–6)}	(Spain) Jose Dominguez Alonso (Switzerland) Patrick Schoen	(Spain) John Echeverría (Switzerland) Patrick Schoen	(Turkey) Mert Alkaya (Denmark) Oskar Brostrøm Poulsen (Iran) Kasra Rahmani (France) Cyril Vandermeersch
March 23	Punta del Este, Uruguay; Clay; M15; Singles and doubles draws	Singles final between (Chile) Bastián Malla / (Argentina) Rocco Valente was cancelled due to poor weather		(Argentina) Tomás Martínez (Argentina) Ignacio Monzón	(Argentina) Santiago De la Fuente (Argentina) Valentino Grippo (Argentina) Fantino Alberca de las Casas (Argentina) Santiago Pesino
March 23	Punta del Este, Uruguay; Clay; M15; Singles and doubles draws	(Argentina) Tomás Martínez (Argentina) Ezequiel Monferrer; 6–3, 7–5	(Brazil) Victor Hugo Remondy Pagotto (Brazil) Gabriel Schenekenberg	(Argentina) Tomás Martínez (Argentina) Ignacio Monzón	(Argentina) Santiago De la Fuente (Argentina) Valentino Grippo (Argentina) Fantino Alberca de las Casas (Argentina) Santiago Pesino
March 30	Maanshan, China; Hard (i); M25; Singles and doubles draws	(United Kingdom) Alastair Gray; 6–2, 6–3	(Chinese Taipei) Lee Kuan-yi	(Uzbekistan) Sergey Fomin (Australia) James McCabe	Ilia Simakin (United Kingdom) Charles Broom (Australia) Enzo Aguiard (Northern Mariana Islands) Colin Sinclair
March 30	Maanshan, China; Hard (i); M25; Singles and doubles draws	(Republic of Ireland) Charles Barry (United Kingdom) Charles Broom; 6–4, 6–4	(Japan) Tomohiro Masabayashi (Japan) Yamato Sueoka	(Uzbekistan) Sergey Fomin (Australia) James McCabe	Ilia Simakin (United Kingdom) Charles Broom (Australia) Enzo Aguiard (Northern Mariana Islands) Colin Sinclair
March 30	Reus, Spain; Clay; M25; Singles and doubles draws	(Spain) Àlex Martí Pujolràs; 2–6, 7–5, 6–4	(Spain) Max Alcalá Gurri	(Portugal) João Domingues (Venezuela) Ignacio Parisca Romera	(France) Florent Bax (Spain) Sergi Fita Juan (Spain) Sergi Pérez Contri (France) Geoffrey Blancaneaux
March 30	Reus, Spain; Clay; M25; Singles and doubles draws	(United States) Zachary Fuchs (United Kingdom) James Hopper; 6–1, 6–4	(United States) Dakotah Bobo (Venezuela) Brandon Pérez	(Portugal) João Domingues (Venezuela) Ignacio Parisca Romera	(France) Florent Bax (Spain) Sergi Fita Juan (Spain) Sergi Pérez Contri (France) Geoffrey Blancaneaux
March 30	Santa Margherita di Pula, Italy; Clay; M25; Singles and doubles draws	(Italy) Giuseppe La Vela; 7–5, 4–6, 7–6^{(10–8)}	(South Africa) Philip Henning	(Netherlands) Max Houkes (Romania) Nicholas David Ionel	(Turkey) Ergi Kırkın (Italy) Niccolò Catini (Italy) Gabriele Maria Noce (Italy) Giovanni Oradini
March 30	Santa Margherita di Pula, Italy; Clay; M25; Singles and doubles draws	(Turkey) Ergi Kırkın (Germany) Niels McDonald; 6–1, 6–3	(South Africa) Philip Henning (Bulgaria) Yanaki Milev	(Netherlands) Max Houkes (Romania) Nicholas David Ionel	(Turkey) Ergi Kırkın (Italy) Niccolò Catini (Italy) Gabriele Maria Noce (Italy) Giovanni Oradini
March 30	Heraklion, Greece; Hard; M25; Singles and doubles draws	(Belgium) Michael Geerts; 6–4, 7–6^{(7–2)}	(United Kingdom) Henry Searle	(Ivory Coast) Eliakim Coulibaly (France) Robin Bertrand	(Spain) Imanol López Morillo (Netherlands) Thijs Boogaard (Greece) Ioannis Xilas (Czech Republic) Jakub Nicod
March 30	Heraklion, Greece; Hard; M25; Singles and doubles draws	(United Kingdom) Scott Duncan (United Kingdom) Hamish Stewart; 6–4, 6–2	(United States) Alex Jones (United States) Miles Jones	(Ivory Coast) Eliakim Coulibaly (France) Robin Bertrand	(Spain) Imanol López Morillo (Netherlands) Thijs Boogaard (Greece) Ioannis Xilas (Czech Republic) Jakub Nicod
March 30	Kashiwa, Japan; Hard; M15; Singles and doubles draws	(Australia) Moerani Bouzige; 6–3, 6–3	(Japan) Hikaru Shiraishi	(United Kingdom) Emile Hudd (Australia) Chase Ferguson	(Japan) Leo Vithoontien (Japan) Yuta Kawahashi (Japan) Shintaro Imai (Japan) Hyu Kawanishi
March 30	Kashiwa, Japan; Hard; M15; Singles and doubles draws	(Japan) Keisuke Saitoh (Japan) Hikaru Shiraishi; 6–3, 6–4	(Japan) Yuta Kawahashi (Japan) Jumpei Yamasaki	(United Kingdom) Emile Hudd (Australia) Chase Ferguson	(Japan) Leo Vithoontien (Japan) Yuta Kawahashi (Japan) Shintaro Imai (Japan) Hyu Kawanishi
March 30	Sharm El Sheikh, Egypt; Hard; M15; Singles and doubles draws	(Czech Republic) Marek Gengel; 7–6^{(7–5)}, 7–6^{(8–6)}	(Latvia) Robert Strombachs	(Czech Republic) Daniel Siniakov (Ukraine) Yurii Dzhavakian	(Turkey) Kerem Yılmaz (France) Constantin Bittoun Kouzmine; Andrei Kunitsyn (Egypt) Karim Ibrahim
March 30	Sharm El Sheikh, Egypt; Hard; M15; Singles and doubles draws	Timofei Derepasko (Czech Republic) Daniel Siniakov; 6–4, 7–6^{(7–5)}	(France) Constantin Bittoun Kouzmine (Latvia) Robert Strombachs	(Czech Republic) Daniel Siniakov (Ukraine) Yurii Dzhavakian	(Turkey) Kerem Yılmaz (France) Constantin Bittoun Kouzmine; Andrei Kunitsyn (Egypt) Karim Ibrahim
March 30	Monastir, Tunisia; Hard; M15; Singles and doubles draws	(Turkey) Mert Alkaya; 6–4, 6–4	(Portugal) Tiago Torres	(Tunisia) Alaa Trifi (Iran) Kasra Rahmani	(New Zealand) Anton Shepp (Germany) Nikolai Barsukov (United Kingdom) Millen Hurrion (Germany) Yannik Kelm
March 30	Monastir, Tunisia; Hard; M15; Singles and doubles draws	(New Zealand) Isaac Becroft (New Zealand) Anton Shepp; 7–6^{(10–8)}, 3–6, [10–3]	(Turkey) S Mert Özdemir (Turkey) Mert Naci Türker	(Tunisia) Alaa Trifi (Iran) Kasra Rahmani	(New Zealand) Anton Shepp (Germany) Nikolai Barsukov (United Kingdom) Millen Hurrion (Germany) Yannik Kelm
