= 2026 Istanbul Challenger =

- Date: 7–13 September
- Edition: 40th
- Surface: Hard
- Location: Istanbul, Turkey

Champions

Singles
- (United Kingdom) Max Basing

Doubles
- (United States) Alafia Ayeni / (United States) Keshav Chopra
- Istanbul Challenger

The 2026 Istanbul Challenger was a professional tennis tournament played on hardcourts. It was the 40th edition of the tournament which was part of the 2026 ATP Challenger Tour. It took place in Istanbul, Turkey between 7 and 13 September 2026.

== Singles main-draw entrants ==
=== Seeds ===
| Country | Player | Rank^{1} | Seed |
|---|---|---|---|
| ITA | Francesco Maestrelli | 168 | 1 |
| LTU | Edas Butvilas | 195 | 2 |
| KAZ | Timofey Skatov | 205 | 3 |
| ROU | Cezar Crețu | 230 | 4 |
| DEN | August Holmgren | 247 | 5 |
| POL | Maks Kaśnikowski | 258 | 6 |
| GBR | Max Basing | 259 | 7 |
| ITA | Michele Ribecai | 264 | 8 |

- ^{1} Rankings are as of 31 August 2026.

=== Other entrants ===
The following players received wildcards into the singles main draw:

- (Turkey) Emirhan Bulut
- (Turkey) Atakan Karahan
- (Turkey) Koray Kırcı

The following player received entry into the singles main draw through the Next Gen Accelerator programme:

- (Colombia) Miguel Tobón

The following players received entry into the singles main draw as alternates:

- (United States) Alafia Ayeni
- (United States) Christian Langmo

The following players received entry from the qualifying draw:

- (Moldova) Radu Albot
- (Romania) Adrian Boitan
- (Romania) Gabriel Ghețu
- (Algeria) Samir Hamza Reguig
- (Mexico) Alex Hernández
- (Egypt) Fares Zakaria

== Champions ==
=== Singles ===
- (United Kingdom) Max Basing def. (Japan) Jay Friend 6–3, 1–6, 6–0.

=== Doubles ===
- (United States) Alafia Ayeni / (United States) Keshav Chopra def. (Denmark) August Holmgren / (Denmark) Carl Emil Overbeck 6–3, 6–7^{(5–7)}, [10–7].
