= 2026 Istanbul Challenger – Singles =

Singles
- 2026 Istanbul Challenger

Final
- Champion: (United Kingdom) Max Basing
- Runner-up: (Japan) Jay Friend
- Score: 6–3, 1–6, 6–0

Events
Singles	Doubles
- Istanbul Challenger

Alex Molčan was the defending champion but chose not to defend his title.

Max Basing won the title after defeating Jay Friend 6–3, 1–6, 6–0 in the final.

== Seeds ==
1. (Italy) Francesco Maestrelli (quarterfinals)
2. (Lithuania) Edas Butvilas (quarterfinals)
3. (Kazakhstan) Timofey Skatov (first round)
4. (Romania) Cezar Crețu (first round)
5. (Denmark) August Holmgren (first round)
6. (Poland) Maks Kaśnikowski (semifinals)
7. (United Kingdom) Max Basing (champion)
8. (Italy) Michele Ribecai (first round)

== Draw ==
Key

- Q = Qualifier
- WC = Wild card
- LL = Lucky loser
- Alt = Alternate
- ITF = ITF entry
- PR = Protected ranking
- SR = Special ranking
- SE = Special exempt
- JE = Junior exempt
- JR = Junior Accelerator Programme entrant
- CO = College Accelerator Programme entrant
- NG = Next Gen Accelerator Program entrant
- w/o = Walkover
- r = Retired
- d = Defaulted

=== Finals ===
Semifinals
6	(Poland) Maks Kaśnikowski	6^{4}	4
(Japan) Jay Friend	7^{7}	6
(France) Harold Mayot	1	3
7	(United Kingdom) Max Basing	6	6

Final
(Japan) Jay Friend	3	6	0
7	(United Kingdom) Max Basing	6	1	6

=== Top half ===
First round
1	(Italy) F Maestrelli	6	6
(Argentina) JP Ficovich	2	2
Alt	(United States) A Ayeni	6	7
(Denmark) CE Overbeck	2	5
(Czech Republic) M Gengel	6^{5}	4
Alt	(United States) Christian Langmo	7^{7}	6
(Spain) Iván Marrero Curbelo	6	5	0
6	(Poland) M Kaśnikowski	4	7	6
3	(Kazakhstan) T Skatov	6^{2}	4
(Turkey) Y Erel	7^{7}	6
Q	(Moldova) R Albot	6	7
(Ukraine) G Kravchenko	4	5
WC	(Turkey) Emirhan Bulut	4	2
Q	(Algeria) Samir Hamza Reguig	6	6
(Japan) J Friend	2	6	6
8	(Italy) M Ribecai	6	4	4

Second round
1	(Italy) F Maestrelli	6^{2}	6	6
Alt	(United States) A Ayeni	7^{7}	1	4
Alt	(United States) C Langmo	3	6^{1}
6	(Poland) M Kaśnikowski	6	7^{7}
(Turkey) Y Erel	6	6
Q	(Moldova) R Albot	4	2
Q	(Algeria) S Hamza Reguig	2	1
(Japan) J Friend	6	6

Quarterfinals
1	(Italy) F Maestrelli	0	6	1
6	(Poland) M Kaśnikowski	6	2	6
(Turkey) Y Erel	6	4	3
(Japan) J Friend	3	6	6

Semifinals
6	(Poland) M Kaśnikowski	6^{4}	4
(Japan) J Friend	7^{7}	6

=== Bottom half ===
First round
5	(Denmark) A Holmgren	4	5
(Ukraine) Vadym Ursu	6	7
Q	(Egypt) Fares Zakaria	1	3
(Bulgaria) D Kuzmanov	6	6
Q	(Romania) A Boitan	7^{7}	6
Q	(Mexico) A Hernández	6^{2}	4
(France) H Mayot	6	6
4	(Romania) C Crețu	2	4
7	(United Kingdom) M Basing	6	6
WC	(Turkey) Atakan Karahan	1	0
(Turkey) Mert Alkaya	6	4	6
(Portugal) T Torres	3	6	2
NG	(Colombia) Miguel Tobón	6	6
WC	(Turkey) K Kırcı	3	3
Q	(Romania) Gabriel Ghețu	5	2
2	(Lithuania) E Butvilas	7	6

Second round
(Ukraine) V Ursu	4	5
(Bulgaria) D Kuzmanov	6	7
Q	(Romania) A Boitan	7^{7}	3	2
(France) H Mayot	6^{2}	6	6
7	(United Kingdom) M Basing	6	7
(Turkey) M Alkaya	4	5
NG	(Colombia) M Tobón	6^{1}	1
2	(Lithuania) E Butvilas	7^{7}	6

Quarterfinals
(Bulgaria) D Kuzmanov	4	2
(France) H Mayot	6	6
7	(United Kingdom) M Basing	6	6
2	(Lithuania) E Butvilas	3	4

Semifinals
(France) H Mayot	1	3
7	(United Kingdom) M Basing	6	6
