= 2026 Istanbul Challenger – Doubles =

Doubles
- 2026 Istanbul Challenger

Final
- Champions: (United States) Alafia Ayeni (United States) Keshav Chopra
- Runners-up: (Denmark) August Holmgren (Denmark) Carl Emil Overbeck
- Score: 6–3, 6–7^{(5–7)}, [10–7]

Events
Singles	Doubles
- Istanbul Challenger

Miloš Karol and Daniel Masur were the defending champions but chose not to defend their title.

Alafia Ayeni and Keshav Chopra won the title after defeating August Holmgren and Carl Emil Overbeck 6–3, 6–7^{(5–7)}, [10–7] in the final.

== Seeds ==
1. (Denmark) Johannes Ingildsen / (Denmark) Oskar Brostrøm Poulsen (first round)
2. (Republic of Ireland) Charles Barry / (United Kingdom) Mark Whitehouse (first round)
3. Sergey Betov / (India) Jeevan Nedunchezhiyan (first round)
4. (Mexico) Alex Hernández / (Spain) Iván Marrero Curbelo (quarterfinals)

== Draw ==
Key

- Q = Qualifier
- WC = Wild card
- LL = Lucky loser
- Alt = Alternate
- ITF = ITF entry
- PR = Protected ranking
- SR = Special ranking
- SE = Special exempt
- JE = Junior exempt
- JR = Junior Accelerator Programme entrant
- CO = College Accelerator Programme entrant
- NG = Next Gen Accelerator Program entrant
- w/o = Walkover
- r = Retired
- d = Defaulted

First round
1	(Denmark) J Ingildsen (Denmark) OB Poulsen	4	6	[2]
(Denmark) A Holmgren (Denmark) CE Overbeck	6	3	[10]
WC	(Turkey) Atakan Karahan (Turkey) Togan Tokaç	5	7^{8}	[8]
(Lithuania) E Butvilas (Italy) F Maestrelli	7	6^{6}	[10]
3	S Betov (India) J Nedunchezhiyan	7^{7}	5	[5]
(Turkey) A Azkara (Turkey) Y Erel	6^{5}	7	[10]
WC	(Turkey) Kaya Arınç (Turkey) K Kırcı	1^{r}
Alt	(Turkey) Mert Alkaya (Turkey) T Duran	4
(United States) A Ayeni (United States) K Chopra	7	6
(Ukraine) Aleksandr Braynin (Ukraine) Vadym Ursu	5	4
(Bulgaria) D Kuzmanov (Germany) L Wessels	4	4
4	(Mexico) A Hernández (Spain) Iván Marrero Curbelo	6	6
(Ukraine) G Kravchenko (Italy) M Ribecai	7	6^{1}	[8]
(Turkey) S Mert Özdemir (Turkey) MN Türker	5	7^{7}	[10]
(Japan) Y Kusuhara (Japan) S Nakagawa	7^{7}	6^{10}	[10]
2	(Republic of Ireland) C Barry (United Kingdom) M Whitehouse	6^{4}	7^{12}	[8]

Quarterfinals
(Denmark) A Holmgren (Denmark) CE Overbeck	w/o
(Lithuania) E Butvilas (Italy) F Maestrelli
(Turkey) A Azkara (Turkey) Y Erel	7	6^{5}	[8]
Alt	(Turkey) M Alkaya (Turkey) T Duran	5	7^{7}	[10]
(United States) A Ayeni (United States) K Chopra	4	7^{7}	[10]
4	(Mexico) A Hernández (Spain) I Marrero Curbelo	6	6^{1}	[8]
(Turkey) SM Özdemir (Turkey) MN Türker	6^{4}	7^{8}	[6]
(Japan) Y Kusuhara (Japan) S Nakagawa	7^{7}	6^{6}	[10]

Semifinals
(Denmark) A Holmgren (Denmark) CE Overbeck	6	6
Alt	(Turkey) M Alkaya (Turkey) T Duran	4	2
(United States) A Ayeni (United States) K Chopra	2	7^{7}	[10]
(Japan) Y Kusuhara (Japan) S Nakagawa	6	6^{4}	[8]

Final
(Denmark) A Holmgren (Denmark) CE Overbeck	3	7^{7}	[7]
(United States) A Ayeni (United States) K Chopra	6	6^{5}	[10]
