= 2022 ATP Cup =

Tennis competition

- Date: 1–9 January
- Edition: 3rd
- Category: ATP Cup
- Draw: 16 teams
- Prize money: $10,000,000
- Surface: Hard
- Location: Sydney, Australia
- Venue: Ken Rosewall Arena, Sydney Super Dome

Champions
- Canada
- ATP Cup

The 2022 ATP Cup was the third and final edition of the ATP Cup. It was an international outdoor hard court men's team tennis tournament held by the Association of Tennis Professionals (ATP). The tournament was part of the 2022 ATP Tour.

Due to the uncertainties with the ongoing COVID-19 pandemic, it was held at the Ken Rosewall Arena and the Sydney Super Dome, from 1 to 9 January 2022 with 16 teams. Canada won the tournament, defeating Spain 2–0 in the final.

On 7 August 2022, as a result of all three editions being very poorly attended and riddled with logistical issues, along with heavy financial losses and the event being deeply unpopular with fans, players - particularly women's players - and officials, Tennis Australia announced that the ATP Cup would be shut down, to be replaced by a mixed-gender United Cup from 2023.

== ATP ranking points ==
Type	Player ranked	Round	Points per win vs. opponent ranked						
Type	Player ranked	Round	No. 1–10	No. 11–20	No. 21–30	No. 31–50	No. 51–100	No. 101–250	No. 251+
Singles	No. 1–250	Final	280	220	160	120	90	60	40
Singles	No. 1–250	Semifinals	200	160	120	90	60	40	30
Singles	No. 1–250	Group stage	90	80	60	45	30	25	20
Singles	No. 251+	Final	85					55	40
Singles	No. 251+	Semifinals	55					40	30
Singles	No. 251+	Group stage	30					20	15
Doubles	Any	Final	90						
Doubles	Any	Semifinals	75						
Doubles	Any	Group stage	45						

- Maximum 750 points for undefeated singles player, 250 points for doubles.

== Entries ==
Fifteen countries qualified for the ATP Cup, based on the ATP ranking of its No. 1 singles player at the entry deadline on 2 December 2021, while host country Australia received a wild card.

=== Withdrawals ===
In November, Switzerland withdrew after world number 16 Roger Federer withdrew from the event due to his recovery from a knee injury.

On 1 December, Spanish world number six Rafael Nadal declined to take part in the Cup, though Spain qualified with their next best singles player.

Austria initially qualified with world number 15 Dominic Thiem: however, Thiem declined to participate, while Dennis Novak withdrew due to being unable to travel to Australia on 29 December. Austria were withdrawn from the competition by ATP Cup officials, as the Cup rules require at least one player from each country to be ranked inside the top 250, whereas their next three players were not. Austria were replaced with France.

Serbian world number 1 Novak Djokovic withdrew on 29 December 2021 due to travel and logisitical issues, but Serbia remained at the ATP Cup as their next best ranked player Dušan Lajović met the entry criteria.

Russia were originally to be represented by Andrey Rublev and Aslan Karatsev, but both withdrew on 29 December 2021.

#	Nation	No. 1 player	Rank	No. 2 player	Rank	No. 3 player	No. 4 player	No. 5 player	Captain
1	Serbia	Dušan Lajović	33	Filip Krajinović	42	Nikola Ćaćić	Matej Sabanov	—	Ivan Sabanov
2	Russia	Daniil Medvedev	2	Roman Safiullin	167	Evgeny Karlovskiy	Alexander Shevchenko	—	Gilles Cervara
3	Germany	Alexander Zverev	3	Jan-Lennard Struff	51	Yannick Hanfmann	Kevin Krawietz	Tim Pütz	Michael Kohlmann
4	Greece	Stefanos Tsitsipas	4	Michail Pervolarakis	399	Petros Tsitsipas	Markos Kalovelonis	Aristotelis Thanos	Apostolos Tsitsipas
5	Italy	Matteo Berrettini	7	Jannik Sinner	10	Lorenzo Sonego	Simone Bolelli	Fabio Fognini	Vincenzo Santopadre
6	Norway	Casper Ruud	8	Viktor Durasovic	345	Lukas Hellum Lilleengen	Leyton Rivera	Andreja Petrovic	Christian Ruud
7	Poland	Hubert Hurkacz	9	Kamil Majchrzak	117	Kacper Żuk	Jan Zieliński	Szymon Walków	Marcin Matkowski
8	Canada	Félix Auger-Aliassime	11	Denis Shapovalov	14	Brayden Schnur	Steven Diez	—	Félix Auger-Aliassime
9	Great Britain	Cameron Norrie	12	Dan Evans	25	Liam Broady	Joe Salisbury	Jamie Murray	Liam Broady
10	Argentina	Diego Schwartzman	13	Federico Delbonis	44	Federico Coria	Máximo González	Andrés Molteni	Alejandro Fabbri
11	Chile	Cristian Garín	17	Alejandro Tabilo	139	Tomás Barrios Vera	—	—	Jorge Aguilar
12	Spain	Roberto Bautista Agut	19	Pablo Carreño Busta	20	Albert Ramos Viñolas	A. Davidovich Fokina	Pedro Martínez	Tomás Carbonell
13	Georgia	Nikoloz Basilashvili	22	Aleksandre Metreveli	571	Aleksandre Bakshi	Zura Tkemaladze	Saba Purtseladze	David Kvernadze
14	United States	Taylor Fritz	23	John Isner	24	Brandon Nakashima	Rajeev Ram	—	Michael Russell
15 (WC)	Australia	Alex de Minaur	34	James Duckworth	49	Max Purcell	John Peers	Luke Saville	Lleyton Hewitt
16	France	Ugo Humbert	35	Arthur Rinderknech	58	Édouard Roger-Vasselin	Fabrice Martin	—	Nicolas Copin

- Rankings are as of 27 December 2021.

== Group stage ==
The 16 teams were divided into four groups of four teams each in a round-robin format. The winners of each group will qualify for the semifinals.

Qualified for the knockout stage
Eliminated

=== Overview ===
G = Group, T = Ties, M = Matches, S = Sets

G	Winner				Second place				Third place				Fourth place			
G	Nation	T	M	S	Nation	T	M	S	Nation	T	M	S	Nation	T	M	S
A	Spain	3–0	8–1	17–3	Chile	2–1	4–5	10–12	Serbia	1–2	4–5	9–12	Norway	0–3	2–7	5–14
B	Russia	3–0	7–2	15–8	Australia	2–1	4–5	9–12	Italy	1–2	5–4	12–9	France	0–3	2–7	8–15
C^{*}	Canada	2–1	4–5	9–12	Great Britain	2–1	5–4	11–9	Germany	1–2	4–5	10–11	United States	1–2	5–4	12–10
D	Poland	3–0	8–1	17–4	Argentina	2–1	6–3	12–8	Greece	1–2	3–6	9–13	Georgia	0–3	1–8	4–17

- Two-way ties between teams in Group C broken by head-to-head records

=== Group A ===
Pos.	Country	Ties	Matches	Sets	Sets %	Games	Games %
1	Spain	3–0	8–1	17–3	85.0%	108–71	60.3%
2	Chile	2–1	4–5	10–12	45.5%	86–88	49.4%
3	Serbia	1–2	4–5	9–12	42.9%	85–89	48.9%
4	Norway	0–3	2–7	5–14	26.3%	75–106	41.4%

==== Chile vs. Spain ====
Chile
0
Ken Rosewall Arena
1 January 2022

Spain
3

			1	2	3
1	(Chile) (Spain)	Alejandro Tabilo; Pablo Carreño Busta	4; 6	6^{4} 7^{7}
2	(Chile) (Spain)	Cristian Garín; Roberto Bautista Agut	0; 6	3; 6
3	(Chile) (Spain)	Tomás Barrios Vera / Alejandro Tabilo; Alejandro Davidovich Fokina / Pedro Martínez	6^{3} 7^{7}	6; 4	7; 10

==== Serbia vs. Norway ====
Serbia
2
Ken Rosewall Arena
1 January 2022

Norway
1

			1	2	3
1	(Serbia) (Norway)	Filip Krajinović; Viktor Durasovic	6; 2	7; 5
2	(Serbia) (Norway)	Dušan Lajović; Casper Ruud	3; 6	5; 7
3	(Serbia) (Norway)	Nikola Ćaćić / Filip Krajinović; Viktor Durasovic / Casper Ruud	7^{7} 6^{3}	6; 3

==== Norway vs. Spain ====
Norway
0
Sydney Super Dome
3 January 2022

Spain
3

			1	2	3
1	(Norway) (Spain)	Viktor Durasovic; Pablo Carreño Busta	3; 6	3; 6
2	(Norway) (Spain)	Casper Ruud; Roberto Bautista Agut	4; 6	6^{4} 7^{7}
3	(Norway) (Spain)	Lukas Hellum Lilleengen / Andreja Petrovic; Alejandro Davidovich Fokina / Pedro Martínez	4; 6	1; 6

==== Serbia vs. Chile ====
Serbia
1
Sydney Super Dome
3 January 2022

Chile
2

			1	2	3
1	(Serbia) (Chile)	Filip Krajinović; Alejandro Tabilo	6; 4	3; 6	7^{7} 6^{5}
2	(Serbia) (Chile)	Dušan Lajović; Cristian Garín	6; 4	4; 6	0; 3	retired
3	(Serbia) (Chile)	Nikola Ćaćić / Matej Sabanov; Tomás Barrios Vera / Alejandro Tabilo	4; 6	6; 3	7; 10

Note: By ATP Cup rules a retired match counts as a straight-set win or loss, but not into percentage of games.

==== Norway vs. Chile ====
Norway
1
Ken Rosewall Arena
5 January 2022

Chile
2

			1	2	3
1	(Norway) (Chile)	Viktor Durasovic; Alejandro Tabilo	1; 6	7^{7} 6^{5}	1; 6
2	(Norway) (Chile)	Casper Ruud; Cristian Garín	6; 4	6; 1
3	(Norway) (Chile)	Andreja Petrovic / Leyton Rivera; Tomás Barrios Vera / Alejandro Tabilo	0; 6	4; 6

==== Serbia vs. Spain ====
Serbia
1
Ken Rosewall Arena
5 January 2022

Spain
2

			1	2	3
1	(Serbia) (Spain)	Filip Krajinović; Pablo Carreño Busta	3; 6	4; 6
2	(Serbia) (Spain)	Dušan Lajović; Roberto Bautista Agut	1; 6	4; 6
3	(Serbia) (Spain)	Nikola Ćaćić / Matej Sabanov; Pedro Martínez / Albert Ramos Viñolas	6^{5} 7^{7}	6; 3	10; 5

=== Group B ===
Pos.	Country	Ties	Matches	Sets	Sets %	Games	Games %
1	Russia	3–0	7–2	15–8	65.2%	120–107	52.9%
2	Australia	2–1	4–5	9–12	42.9%	96–100	49.0%
3	Italy	1–2	5–4	12–9	57.1%	105–98	51.7%
4	France	0–3	2–7	8–15	34.8%	106–122	46.5%

==== Russia vs. France ====
Russia
2
Ken Rosewall Arena
2 January 2022

France
1

			1	2	3
1	(Russia) (France)	Roman Safiullin; Arthur Rinderknech	2; 6	7; 5	6; 3
2	(Russia) (France)	Daniil Medvedev; Ugo Humbert	7^{7} 6^{5}	5; 7	6^{2} 7^{7}
3	(Russia) (France)	Daniil Medvedev / Roman Safiullin; Fabrice Martin / Édouard Roger-Vasselin	6; 4	6; 4

==== Italy vs Australia ====
Italy
1
Ken Rosewall Arena
2 January 2022

Australia
2

			1	2	3
1	(Italy) (Australia)	Jannik Sinner; Max Purcell	6; 1	6; 3
2	(Italy) (Australia)	Matteo Berrettini; Alex de Minaur	3; 6	6^{4} 7^{7}
3	(Italy) (Australia)	Matteo Berrettini / Simone Bolelli; John Peers / Luke Saville	3; 6	5; 7

==== Italy vs. France ====
Italy
3
Sydney Super Dome
4 January 2022

France
0

			1	2	3
1	(Italy) (France)	Jannik Sinner; Arthur Rinderknech	6; 3	7^{7} 6^{3}
2	(Italy) (France)	Matteo Berrettini; Ugo Humbert	6; 4	7^{8} 6^{6}
3	(Italy) (France)	Matteo Berrettini / Jannik Sinner; Fabrice Martin / Édouard Roger-Vasselin	6; 3	6^{7} 7^{9}	10; 8

==== Russia vs Australia ====
Russia
3
Sydney Super Dome
4 January 2022

Australia
0

			1	2	3
1	(Russia) (Australia)	Roman Safiullin; James Duckworth	7^{8} 6^{6}	6; 4
2	(Russia) (Australia)	Daniil Medvedev; Alex de Minaur	6; 4	6; 2
3	(Russia) (Australia)	Daniil Medvedev / Roman Safiullin; John Peers / Luke Saville	7^{9} 6^{7}	3; 6	10; 6

==== Russia vs. Italy ====
Russia
2
Ken Rosewall Arena
6 January 2022

Italy
1

			1	2	3
1	(Russia) (Italy)	Roman Safiullin; Jannik Sinner	6^{6} 7^{8}	3; 6
2	(Russia) (Italy)	Daniil Medvedev; Matteo Berrettini	6; 2	6^{5} 7^{7}	6; 4
3	(Russia) (Italy)	Daniil Medvedev / Roman Safiullin; Matteo Berrettini / Jannik Sinner	5; 7	6; 4	10; 5

==== Australia vs. France ====
Australia
2
Ken Rosewall Arena
6 January 2022

France
1

			1	2	3
1	(Australia) (France)	James Duckworth; Arthur Rinderknech	4; 6	6^{6} 7^{8}
2	(Australia) (France)	Alex de Minaur; Ugo Humbert	3; 6	7^{7} 6^{2}	6; 1
3	(Australia) (France)	John Peers / Luke Saville; Fabrice Martin / Édouard Roger-Vasselin	6; 2	5; 7	11; 9

=== Group C ===
Pos.^{*}	Country	Ties	Matches	Sets	Sets %	Games	Games %
1	Canada	2–1	4–5	9–12	42.9%	100–108	48.1%
2	Great Britain	2–1	5–4	11–9	55.0%	97–94	50.8%
3	Germany	1–2	4–5	10–11	47.6%	96–108	47.1%
4	United States	1–2	5–4	12–10	54.5%	117–100	53.9%

- Two-way ties between teams broken by head-to-head records.

==== Canada vs. United States ====
Canada
0
Sydney Super Dome
2 January 2022

United States
3

			1	2	3
1	(Canada) (United States)	Brayden Schnur; John Isner	1; 6	3; 6
2	(Canada) (United States)	Félix Auger-Aliassime; Taylor Fritz	7^{8} 6^{6}	4; 6	4; 6
3	(Canada) (United States)	Félix Auger-Aliassime / Denis Shapovalov; Taylor Fritz / John Isner	4; 6	4; 6

==== Germany vs. Great Britain ====
Germany
1
Sydney Super Dome
2 January 2022

Great Britain
2

			1	2	3
1	(Germany) (United Kingdom)	Jan-Lennard Struff; Dan Evans	1; 6	2; 6
2	(Germany) (United Kingdom)	Alexander Zverev; Cameron Norrie	7^{7} 6^{2}	6; 1
3	(Germany) (United Kingdom)	Kevin Krawietz / Alexander Zverev; Dan Evans / Jamie Murray	3; 6	4; 6

==== Germany vs. United States ====
Germany
2
Ken Rosewall Arena
4 January 2022

United States
1

			1	2	3
1	(Germany) (United States)	Jan-Lennard Struff; John Isner	7^{9} 6^{7}	4; 6	7; 5
2	(Germany) (United States)	Alexander Zverev; Taylor Fritz	6; 4	6; 4
3	(Germany) (United States)	Kevin Krawietz / Tim Pütz; Taylor Fritz / John Isner	0; 6	3; 6

==== Canada vs. Great Britain ====
Canada
2
Ken Rosewall Arena
4 January 2022

Great Britain
1

			1	2	3
1	(Canada) (United Kingdom)	Denis Shapovalov; Dan Evans	4; 6	4; 6
2	(Canada) (United Kingdom)	Félix Auger-Aliassime; Cameron Norrie	7^{7} 6^{4}	6; 3
3	(Canada) (United Kingdom)	Félix Auger-Aliassime / Denis Shapovalov; Jamie Murray / Joe Salisbury	6; 4	6; 1

==== Great Britain vs. United States ====
Great Britain
2
Sydney Super Dome
6 January 2022

United States
1

			1	2	3
1	(United Kingdom) (United States)	Dan Evans; John Isner	6; 4	7^{7} 6^{3}
2	(United Kingdom) (United States)	Cameron Norrie; Taylor Fritz	6^{4} 7^{7}	6; 3	1; 6
3	(United Kingdom) (United States)	Dan Evans / Jamie Murray; Taylor Fritz / John Isner	6^{3} 7^{7}	7; 5	10; 8

==== Germany vs. Canada ====
Germany
1
Sydney Super Dome
6 January 2022

Canada
2

			1	2	3
1	(Germany) (Canada)	Jan-Lennard Struff; Denis Shapovalov	6^{5} 7^{7}	6; 4	3; 6
2	(Germany) (Canada)	Alexander Zverev; Félix Auger-Aliassime	4; 6	6; 4	3; 6
3	(Germany) (Canada)	Kevin Krawietz / Tim Pütz; Steven Diez / Brayden Schnur	6; 3	6; 4

=== Group D ===
Pos.	Country	Ties	Matches	Sets	Sets %	Games	Games %
1	Poland	3–0	8–1	17–4	81.0%	117–68	63.2%
2	Argentina	2–1	6–3	12–8	60.0%	104–77	57.5%
3	Greece	1–2	3–6	9–13	40.9%	70–93	42.9%
4	Georgia	0–3	1–8	4–17	19.0%	47–100	32.0%

==== Argentina vs. Georgia ====
Argentina
3
Sydney Super Dome
1 January 2022

Georgia
0

			1	2	3
1	(Argentina) (Georgia (country))	Federico Delbonis; Aleksandre Metreveli	6; 1	6; 2
2	(Argentina) (Georgia (country))	Diego Schwartzman; Nikoloz Basilashvili	6; 1	6; 2
3	(Argentina) (Georgia (country))	Máximo González / Andrés Molteni; Saba Purtseladze / Zura Tkemaladze	6; 1	6; 2

==== Greece vs. Poland ====
Greece
1
Sydney Super Dome
1 January 2022

Poland
2

			1	2	3
1	(Greece) (Poland)	Michail Pervolarakis; Kamil Majchrzak	1; 6	4; 6
2	(Greece) (Poland)	Aristotelis Thanos; Hubert Hurkacz	1; 6	2; 6
3	(Greece) (Poland)	Michail Pervolarakis / Stefanos Tsitsipas; Hubert Hurkacz / Jan Zieliński	6; 4	5; 7	10; 8

==== Poland vs. Georgia ====
Poland
3
Ken Rosewall Arena
3 January 2022

Georgia
0

			1	2	3
1	(Poland) (Georgia (country))	Kamil Majchrzak; Aleksandre Bakshi	6; 1	6; 1
2	(Poland) (Georgia (country))	Hubert Hurkacz; Aleksandre Metreveli	6^{5} 7^{7}	6; 3	6; 1
3	(Poland) (Georgia (country))	Szymon Walków / Jan Zieliński; Aleksandre Bakshi / Zura Tkemaladze	6^{2} 7^{7}	6; 2	10; 6

==== Greece vs. Argentina ====
Greece
0
Ken Rosewall Arena
3 January 2022

Argentina
3

			1	2	3
1	(Greece) (Argentina)	Michail Pervolarakis; Federico Delbonis	6^{5} 7^{7}	1; 6
2	(Greece) (Argentina)	Stefanos Tsitsipas; Diego Schwartzman	7^{7} 6^{5}	3; 6	3; 6
3	(Greece) (Argentina)	Markos Kalovelonis / Petros Tsitsipas; Máximo González / Andrés Molteni	3; 6	6; 4	9; 11

==== Poland vs. Argentina ====
Poland
3
Sydney Super Dome
5 January 2022

Argentina
0

			1	2	3
1	(Poland) (Argentina)	Kamil Majchrzak; Federico Delbonis	6; 3	7^{7} 6^{3}
2	(Poland) (Argentina)	Hubert Hurkacz; Diego Schwartzman	6; 1	6; 4
3	(Poland) (Argentina)	Szymon Walków / Jan Zieliński; Máximo González / Andrés Molteni	7^{7} 6^{4}	7^{7} 6^{5}

==== Greece vs. Georgia ====
Greece
2
Sydney Super Dome
5 January 2022

Georgia
1

			1	2	3
1	(Greece) (Georgia (country))	Michail Pervolarakis; Aleksandre Metreveli	6; 3	6; 2
2	(Greece) (Georgia (country))	Stefanos Tsitsipas; Nikoloz Basilashvili	4; 1			retired
3	(Greece) (Georgia (country))	Michail Pervolarakis / Stefanos Tsitsipas; Aleksandre Bakshi / Aleksandre Metreveli	6; 4	3; 6	14; 16

Note: By ATP Cup rules a retired match counts as a straight-set win or loss, but not into percentage of games.

== Knockout stage ==
=== Bracket ===
Semifinals
12	Spain	2
7	Poland	1
8	Canada	2
2	Russia	1

Final
12	Spain	0
8	Canada	2

=== Semifinals ===
==== Spain vs. Poland ====
Spain
2
Ken Rosewall Arena
7 January 2022

Poland
1

			1	2	3
1	(Spain) (Poland)	Pablo Carreño Busta; Jan Zieliński	6; 2	6; 1
2	(Spain) (Poland)	Roberto Bautista Agut; Hubert Hurkacz	7^{8} 6^{6}	2; 6	7^{7} 6^{5}
3	(Spain) (Poland)	Pedro Martínez / Albert Ramos Viñolas; Szymon Walków / Jan Zieliński	6; 4	3; 6	6; 10

==== Canada vs. Russia ====
Canada
2
Ken Rosewall Arena
8 January 2022

Russia
1

			1	2	3
1	(Canada) (Russia)	Denis Shapovalov; Roman Safiullin	6; 4	5; 7	6; 4
2	(Canada) (Russia)	Félix Auger-Aliassime; Daniil Medvedev	4; 6	0; 6
3	(Canada) (Russia)	Félix Auger-Aliassime / Denis Shapovalov; Daniil Medvedev / Roman Safiullin	4; 6	7; 5	10; 7

=== Final ===
==== Spain vs. Canada ====
Spain
0
Ken Rosewall Arena
9 January 2022

Canada
2

			1	2	3
1	(Spain) (Canada)	Pablo Carreño Busta; Denis Shapovalov	4; 6	3; 6
2	(Spain) (Canada)	Roberto Bautista Agut; Félix Auger-Aliassime	6^{3} 7^{7}	3; 6
3	(Spain) (Canada)	Alejandro Davidovich Fokina / Pedro Martínez; Félix Auger-Aliassime / Denis Shapovalov				not played
