= Carl Emil Overbeck =

Danish tennis player (born 2001)

- Country (sports): Denmark
- Born: 11 August 2001 (age 25) Copenhagen, Denmark
- Height: 1.93 m (6 ft 4 in)
- Plays: Right-handed (two-handed backhand)
- College: California
- Coach: Krzysztof Kwinta, Jacob Holst
- Prize money: US $60,409

Singles
- Career record: 0–0 (at ATP Tour level, Grand Slam level, and in Davis Cup)
- Career titles: 4 ITF
- Highest ranking: No. 289 (14 September 2026)
- Current ranking: No. 290 (28 September 2026)

Doubles
- Career record: 0–1 (at ATP Tour level, Grand Slam level, and in Davis Cup)
- Career titles: 1 Challenger, 8 ITF
- Highest ranking: No. 331 (28 September 2026)
- Current ranking: No. 331 (28 September 2026)
- Last updated on: 29 September 2026.

Carl Emil Overbeck (born 11 August 2001) is a Danish tennis player. He has a career high ATP singles ranking of No. 289 and a career high ATP doubles ranking of No. 331 achieved on 28 September 2026.

Overbeck represents Denmark at the Davis Cup, where he has a win/loss record of 0–1. He has played in the 2026 Davis Cup with Oskar Brostrøm Poulsen against Croatia.

Overbeck played college tennis at California.

== Career ==
In between June and July 2026, Overbeck made it to 3 ITF finals in a row in Porto, Figueira da Foz and Gentofte, winning the first two against Hunter Heck and Mert Alkaya, while losing the final one to Petr Nesterov.

In August, he won another ITF tournament in Fano, where he beat Marcello Serafini.

In September 2026, Overbeck made it to one ATP Challenger doubles final at the 2026 Istanbul Challenger with August Holmgren, where this lost to Alafia Ayeni and Keshav Chopra.

== ATP Challenger and ITF World Tennis Tour finals ==
=== Singles: 4 (4 titles, 4 runner-ups) ===
Legend (singles) ATP Challenger Tour (0–0) ITF World Tennis Tour (4–4)	Finals by surface Hard (3–1) Clay (1–3) Grass (0–0)

Result	W–L	Date	Tournament	Tier	Surface	Opponent	Score
Loss	0–1	Jul 2024	M15 Kuršumlijska Banja, Serbia	WTT	Clay	(Italy) Federico Bondioli	3–6, 7–5, 6–7^{(1–7)}
Loss	0–2	Jun 2025	M15 Alkmaar, Netherlands	WTT	Clay	(France) Lilian Marmousez	3–6, 0–6
Loss	0–3	Oct 2025	M25 Brisbane, Australia	WTT	Hard	(Australia) Dane Sweeny	7–6^{(7–5)}, 3–6, 2–6
Win	1–3	Mar 2026	M15 Nishitokyo, Japan	WTT	Hard	(United States) Hunter Heck	6–3, 6–2
Win	2–3	Jun 2026	M25 Porto, Portugal	WTT	Hard	(Turkey) Mert Alkaya	6–3, 6–2
Win	3–3	Jun 2026	M25 Figueira da Foz, Portugal	WTT	Hard	(Switzerland) Patrick Schoen	6–1, 3–6, 6–3
Loss	3–4	Jul 2026	M25 Gentofte, Denmark	WTT	Clay	(Bulgaria) Petr Nesterov	6–3, 3–6, 1–6
Win	4–4	Aug 2026	M25 Fano, Italy	WTT	Clay	(Italy) Marcello Serafini	7–6^{(7–5)}, 7–6^{(9–7)}

=== Doubles: 12 (4 titles, 4 runner-ups) ===
Legend (singles) ATP Challenger Tour (0–1) ITF World Tennis Tour (6–5)	Finals by surface Hard (3–3) Clay (3–3) Grass (0–0)

Result	W–L	Date	Tournament	Tier	Surface	Partner	Opponents	Score
Win	1–0	Jul 2021	M15 Vejle, Denmark	WTT	Clay	(Denmark) Benjamin Hannestad	(Denmark) Johannes Ingildsen (Denmark) Christian Sigsgaard	7–6^{(8–6)}, 4–6, [10–8]
Win	2–0	Jul 2022	M15 Vejle, Denmark	WTT	Clay	(Denmark) Benjamin Hannestad	(Denmark) Anders Grinderslev (Denmark) Elmer Møller	7–5, 6–7^{(9–11)}, [14–12]
Loss	2–1	Aug 2022	M15 Frederiksberg, Denmark	WTT	Clay	(Denmark) Benjamin Hannestad	(Denmark) Johannes Ingildsen (Denmark) Christian Sigsgaard	7–6^{(11–9)}, 6–4
Loss	2–2	Jul 2023	M15 Vejle, Denmark	WTT	Clay	(Denmark) Oskar Brostrøm Poulsen	(Sweden) Simon Freund (Denmark) Johannes Ingildsen	2–6, 3–6
Win	3–2	Jun 2024	M25 Aarhus, Denmark	WTT	Clay	(Denmark) Oskar Brostrøm Poulsen	(Denmark) August Holmgren (Denmark) Christian Sigsgaard	6–4, 3–6, [10–5]
Loss	3–3	Jul 2024	M15 Kuršumlijska Banja, Serbia	WTT	Clay	(Sweden) Olle Sonesson Lidholt	(Italy) Simone Agostini (Argentina) Juan Pablo Paz	4–6, 5–7
Win	4–3	Jun 2025	M15 Amstelveen, Netherlands	WTT	Clay	(Japan) Jay Friend	(Netherlands) Brian Bozemoj (Netherlands) Stijn Pel	6–4, 3–6, [15–13]
Win	5–3	Jul 2025	M15 Kuršumlijska Banja, Serbia	WTT	Clay	(Denmark) Sebastian Grundtvig Jørgensen	(Cyprus) Eleftherios Neos; Semen Pankin	7–6^{(7–3)}, 6–2
Win	6–3	Sep 2025	M15 Falun, Sweden	WTT	Clay	(Denmark) Benjamin Hannestad	(Norway) Herman Hoeyeraal (Spain) Iñaki Montes de la Torre	4–6, 7–6^{(10–8)}, [10–7]
Loss	6–4	Oct 2025	M25 Brisbane, Australia	WTT	Hard	(Japan) Yuichiro Inui	(Australia) Joshua Charlton (United Kingdom) Emile Hudd	3–6, 1–6
Loss	6–5	Feb 2026	M25 Vila Real de Santo António, Portugal	WTT	Hard	(Denmark) Benjamin Hannestad	(United Kingdom) Lui Maxted (United Kingdom) Finn Murgett	6–2, 3–6, [5–10]
Win	7–5	Jun 2026	M15 Figueira da Foz, Portugal	WTT	Hard	(Denmark) Oskar Brostrøm Poulsen	(United Kingdom) Tom Hands (United Kingdom) Matthew Summers	3–6, 6–3, [11–9]
Win	8–5	Jul 2026	M25 Gentofte, Portugal	WTT	Clay	(Denmark) Oskar Brostrøm Poulsen	(Denmark) Valdemar Frederik Pape (Denmark) Gustav Theilgaard	7–5, 6–2
Loss	8–6	Sep 2026	Istanbul, Turkey	Challenger	Clay	(Denmark) August Holmgren	(United States) Alafia Ayeni (United States) Keshav Chopra	6–3, 6–7^{(5–7)}, [10–7].
