= Leyton Rivera =

Norwegian tennis player

- Country (sports): Norway
- Born: 28 October 2001 (age 25) Kristianstad, Sweden
- Height: 1.83 m (6 ft 0 in)
- Turned pro: 2019
- Plays: Right-handed (two-handed backhand)
- Coach: Claudio Rivera
- Prize money: US $47,115

Singles
- Career record: 0–0
- Career titles: 0
- Highest ranking: No. 1,012 (14 September 2026)
- Current ranking: No. 1,038 (9 November 2026)

Doubles
- Career record: 0–1
- Career titles: 0
- Highest ranking: No. 804 (14 September 2026)
- Current ranking: No. 854 (9 November 2026)
- Last updated on: 9 November 2026.

Leyton Rivera (born 28 October 2001) is a Swedish-born Norwegian professional tennis player. He has a career-high ATP singles ranking of No. 1,012 and a doubles ranking of No. 804, both achieved on 14 September 2026.

Rivera represents Norway at international events, like the Davis Cup. He made his ATP Tour debut at the 2022 ATP Cup, as one of the five members of the Norwegian team.
