= Andreja Petrovic =

Norwegian tennis player

- Country (sports): Norway
- Born: 1 February 2000 (age 26) Stavanger, Norway
- Height: 1.88 m (6 ft 2 in)
- Plays: Right-handed (two-handed backhand)
- College: Florida State
- Coach: Chris Doerr
- Prize money: US $31,925

Singles
- Career record: 0–1 (at ATP Tour level, Grand Slam level, and in Davis Cup)
- Career titles: 0
- Highest ranking: No. 604 (19 October 2026)
- Current ranking: No. 604 (19 October 2026)

Doubles
- Career record: 0–2 (at ATP Tour level, Grand Slam level, and in Davis Cup)
- Career titles: 0
- Highest ranking: No. 953 (10 August 2026)
- Current ranking: No. 1,004 (19 October 2026)
- Last updated on: 19 October 2026.

Andreja Petrovic (born 1 February 2000) is a Norwegian tennis player. Petrovic has a career-high ATP singles ranking of No. 604 achieved on 19 October 2026 and a doubles ranking of No. 953 achieved on 10 August 2026.

Petrovic made his ATP main draw debut at the 2022 ATP Cup as one of the five members of the Norwegian team. The following two years he was selected again as a member of the United Cup Norwegian team in 2023 and in 2024.

Petrovic plays college tennis at Florida State University after transferring from the University of North Dakota.

== ITF World Tennis Tour finals ==
=== Singles: 3 (3 runner-ups) ===
Legend (singles) ITF World Tennis Tour (0–3)	Finals by surface Hard (0–1) Clay (0–2)

Result	W–L	Date	Tournament	Tier	Surface	Opponent	Score
Loss	0–1	Nov 2025	M25 Austin, United States	World Tennis Tour	Hard	(United Kingdom) Lui Maxted	2–6, 3–6
Loss	0–2	Apr 2026	M15 Boca Raton, United States	World Tennis Tour	Clay	(United States) Jack Kennedy	3–6, 4–6
Loss	0–3	May 2026	M15 Orange Park, United States	World Tennis Tour	Clay	(Dominican Republic) Nick Hardt	6–1, 1–6, 4–6

=== Doubles: 3 (1 title, 2 runner-ups) ===
Legend (Doubles) ITF World Tennis Tour (1–2)	Finals by surface Hard (0–1) Clay (1–1)

Result	W–L	Date	Tournament	Tier	Surface	Partner	Opponents	Score
Loss	0–1	Jul 2023	M15 Belgrade, Serbia	World Tennis Tour	Clay	(France) Loris Pourroy	(Argentina) Leonardo Aboian (Argentina) Federico Agustín Gómez	6–7^{(5–7)}, 6–7^{(1–7)}
Loss	0–2	Feb 2026	M15 Villena, Spain	World Tennis Tour	Hard	(Norway) Herman Hoeyeraal	(Switzerland) Adrien Burdet (Spain) Oscar José Gutierrez	6–3, 2–6, [8–10]
Win	1–2	Apr 2026	M15 Boca Raton, United States	World Tennis Tour	Clay	(United States) Alexander Kotzen	(United States) Jeffrey Fradkin (United States) William Grant	3–6, 6–3, [10–2]
