= Max Basing =

British tennis player (born 2002)

- Basing at the 2026 Wimbledon Championships
- Country (sports): Great Britain
- Born: 2 October 2002 (age 24) Oxshott, United Kingdom
- Height: 1.80 m (5 ft 11 in)
- Plays: Right-handed (two-handed backhand)
- College: Stanford
- Prize money: US $182,348

Singles
- Career record: 0–1
- Career titles: 7 ITF
- Highest ranking: No. 219 (14 September 2026)
- Current ranking: No. 219 (14 September 2026)

Grand Slam singles results
- Wimbledon: 1R (2026)

Doubles
- Career record: 0–0
- Career titles: 1 ITF
- Highest ranking: No. 756 (10 November 2025)
- Current ranking: No. 1,077 (14 September 2026)
- Last updated on: 14 September 2026.

Max Basing (born 2 October 2002) is a British tennis player. He has a career-high ATP singles ranking of world No. 219 achieved on 14 September 2026 and a doubles ranking of No. 756, reached on 10 November 2025.

Basing played college tennis at Stanford University.

== Career ==
Basing made his Grand Slam debut at the 2026 Wimbledon Championships after he qualified for the main draw. He lost to fellow qualifier Shintaro Mochizuki in the first round. Basing won his first ATP Challenger singles title at the 2026 Istanbul Challenger, defeating Jay Friend in the final.
