= Keshav Chopra =

American tennis player

- Country (sports): United States
- Born: 24 October 2001 (age 25) Marietta, Georgia, US
- Height: 6 ft 0 in (1.83 m)
- Plays: Right-handed (two-handed backhand)
- College: Georgia Tech
- Coach: Alberto De Meo
- Prize money: US $57,908

Singles
- Career record: 0–0
- Career titles: 0
- Highest ranking: No. 652 (November 16, 2026)
- Current ranking: No. 652 (November 16, 2026)

Doubles
- Career record: 0–2
- Career titles: 0
- Highest ranking: No. 240 (October 13, 2025)
- Current ranking: No. 293 (November 16, 2026)
- Last updated on: November 16, 2026.

Keshav Chopra (born 24 October 2001) is an American tennis player. He has a career-high singles ranking of No. 652 achieved on November 16, 2026 and a doubles ranking of No. 240 achieved on October 13, 2025.

== Personal life ==
From Marietta, Georgia, he attended IMG Academy and won the IMG Academy 2019 Student Male Athlete of the Year Award prior to becoming a student at Georgia Tech.

== Career ==
He made his ATP tour debut as a wildcard at the 2021 Atlanta Open – Doubles playing alongside Andres Martin in the first round. Alongside Martin he reached the men’s doubles final at the M25 Southaven tournament in the United States in August 2024, losing against the pairing Michael Zheng and Lui Maxted in straight sets in the final.
