= 2024 ITF Men's World Tennis Tour (October–December) =

The 2024 ITF Men's World Tennis Tour is the 2024 edition of the second-tier tour for men's professional tennis. It is organised by the International Tennis Federation and is a tier below the ATP Challenger Tour. The ITF Men's World Tennis Tour includes tournaments with prize money ranging from $15,000 to $25,000.

Since 2022, following the Russian invasion of Ukraine the ITF announced that players from Belarus and Russia could still play on the tour but would not be allowed to play under the flag of Belarus or Russia.

== Key ==
M25 tournaments
M15 tournaments

== Month ==
=== October ===
Week of	Tournament	Winner	Runners-up	Semifinalists	Quarterfinalists
October 7	Cairns, Australia; Hard; M25; Singles and doubles draws	(Australia) Omar Jasika; 6–3, 6–4	(Australia) Marc Polmans	(Australia) Philip Sekulic (Australia) Blake Ellis	(Australia) Jacob Bradshaw (Australia) Edward Winter (Northern Mariana Islands) Colin Sinclair (Australia) Moerani Bouzige
October 7	Cairns, Australia; Hard; M25; Singles and doubles draws	(Belgium) Tibo Colson (Netherlands) Thijmen Loof; 6–3, 6–2	(Australia) Jake Delaney (Australia) Jesse Delaney	(Australia) Philip Sekulic (Australia) Blake Ellis	(Australia) Jacob Bradshaw (Australia) Edward Winter (Northern Mariana Islands) Colin Sinclair (Australia) Moerani Bouzige
October 7	Edmonton, Canada; Hard (i); M25; Singles and doubles draws	(Canada) Liam Draxl; 6–4, 6–1	(United States) Patrick Maloney	(Canada) Taha Baadi (United States) Adhithya Ganesan	(Tunisia) Aziz Dougaz (Canada) Cleeve Harper (United States) Andre Ilagan (Canada) Alvin Nicholas Tudorica
October 7	Edmonton, Canada; Hard (i); M25; Singles and doubles draws	(Canada) Liam Draxl (Canada) Cleeve Harper; 6–4, 6–4	(Canada) Benjamin Thomas George (Canada) Alvin Nicholas Tudorica	(Canada) Taha Baadi (United States) Adhithya Ganesan	(Tunisia) Aziz Dougaz (Canada) Cleeve Harper (United States) Andre Ilagan (Canada) Alvin Nicholas Tudorica
October 7	Santa Margherita di Pula, Italy; Clay; M25; Singles and doubles draws	(United Kingdom) Jay Clarke; 6–3, 0–0 ret.	(Italy) Gianluca Mager	(Italy) Francesco Maestrelli (Bosnia and Herzegovina) Nerman Fatić	(Germany) Sebastian Fanselow (Bulgaria) Dimitar Kuzmanov (Italy) Lorenzo Giustino (Spain) Nikolás Sánchez Izquierdo
October 7	Santa Margherita di Pula, Italy; Clay; M25; Singles and doubles draws	(Bulgaria) Yanaki Milev (Bulgaria) Petr Nesterov; 7–6^{(7–4)}, 6–3	(Italy) Alessandro Spadola (Italy) Matteo Vavassori	(Italy) Francesco Maestrelli (Bosnia and Herzegovina) Nerman Fatić	(Germany) Sebastian Fanselow (Bulgaria) Dimitar Kuzmanov (Italy) Lorenzo Giustino (Spain) Nikolás Sánchez Izquierdo
October 7	Sintra, Portugal; Hard; M25; Singles and doubles draws	Evgeny Karlovskiy; 6–4, 6–2	(Belgium) Gauthier Onclin	(Portugal) Duarte Vale (France) Mathias Bourgue	(Spain) Mario González Fernández (Portugal) Pedro Araujo (Portugal) Frederico Ferreira Silva (United States) Michael Zhu
October 7	Sintra, Portugal; Hard; M25; Singles and doubles draws	(India) Siddhant Banthia (India) Divij Sharan; 6–1, 6–3	(Portugal) Diogo Marques (Spain) Alejandro Turriziani Álvarez	(Portugal) Duarte Vale (France) Mathias Bourgue	(Spain) Mario González Fernández (Portugal) Pedro Araujo (Portugal) Frederico Ferreira Silva (United States) Michael Zhu
October 7	Kampala, Uganda; Clay; M25; Singles and doubles draws	(France) Corentin Denolly; 6–3, 6–4	(Austria) Maximilian Neuchrist	(Germany) Maik Steiner (France) Paul Barbier Gazeu	(India) Dev Javia (Austria) Gregor Ramskogler (Tunisia) Aziz Ouakaa (Burundi) Guy Orly Iradukunda
October 7	Kampala, Uganda; Clay; M25; Singles and doubles draws	(Burundi) Guy Orly Iradukunda (Tunisia) Aziz Ouakaa; 3–6, 6–4, [10–7]	(United States) Noah Schachter (India) Nitin Kumar Sinha	(Germany) Maik Steiner (France) Paul Barbier Gazeu	(India) Dev Javia (Austria) Gregor Ramskogler (Tunisia) Aziz Ouakaa (Burundi) Guy Orly Iradukunda
October 7	Louisville, United States; Hard; M25; Singles and doubles draws	(United Kingdom) Johannus Monday; 6–2, 6–3	(United States) Tyler Zink	(United Kingdom) Aidan McHugh (United States) Alex Rybakov	(Portugal) Tiago Torres (United States) Keshav Chopra (United States) Aidan Kim (United States) Garrett Johns
October 7	Louisville, United States; Hard; M25; Singles and doubles draws	(United States) JJ Mercer (United Kingdom) Johannus Monday; 7–5, 6–4	(Antigua and Barbuda) Jody Maginley (United States) Evan Zhu	(United Kingdom) Aidan McHugh (United States) Alex Rybakov	(Portugal) Tiago Torres (United States) Keshav Chopra (United States) Aidan Kim (United States) Garrett Johns
October 7	Sharm El Sheikh, Egypt; Hard; M15; Singles and doubles draws	(Czech Republic) Marek Gengel; 6–4, 7–6^{(7–0)}	(Latvia) Robert Strombachs	(Ukraine) Yurii Dzhavakian (Thailand) Maximus Jones	Ilia Simakin (Egypt) Amr Elsayed (Italy) Alexandr Binda (Dominican Republic) Peter Bertran
October 7	Sharm El Sheikh, Egypt; Hard; M15; Singles and doubles draws	Egor Agafonov; Ilia Simakin; Walkover	(Serbia) Boris Butulija (Egypt) Karim Ibrahim	(Ukraine) Yurii Dzhavakian (Thailand) Maximus Jones	Ilia Simakin (Egypt) Amr Elsayed (Italy) Alexandr Binda (Dominican Republic) Peter Bertran
October 7	Grodzisk Mazowiecki, Poland; Hard (i); M15; Singles and doubles draws	(Czech Republic) Zdeněk Kolář; 6–3, 6–4	(Poland) Jasza Szajrych	(Netherlands) Deney Wassermann (Republic of Ireland) Michael Agwi	(Ukraine) Georgii Kravchenko (United Kingdom) Henry Searle (Poland) Martyn Pawelski (Luxembourg) Alex Knaff
October 7	Grodzisk Mazowiecki, Poland; Hard (i); M15; Singles and doubles draws	(Netherlands) Pepijn Bastiaansen (Netherlands) Deney Wassermann; 6–3, 2–6, [11–9]	(Czech Republic) Jan Jermář (Slovakia) Igor Zelenay	(Netherlands) Deney Wassermann (Republic of Ireland) Michael Agwi	(Ukraine) Georgii Kravchenko (United Kingdom) Henry Searle (Poland) Martyn Pawelski (Luxembourg) Alex Knaff
October 7	Pontevedra, Spain; Hard; M15; Singles and doubles draws	(Australia) Matthew Dellavedova; 6–3, 1–6, 6–1	Yaroslav Demin	(Syria) Hazem Naw (Spain) Iñaki Montes de la Torre	(Switzerland) Johan Nikles (Spain) Sergi Pérez Contri (France) Adrien Gobat (United Kingdom) Emile Hudd
October 7	Pontevedra, Spain; Hard; M15; Singles and doubles draws	(Spain) Rafael Izquierdo Luque (Spain) Iván Marrero Curbelo; 6–3, 3–6, [10–6]	Yaroslav Demin (Bulgaria) Iliyan Radulov	(Syria) Hazem Naw (Spain) Iñaki Montes de la Torre	(Switzerland) Johan Nikles (Spain) Sergi Pérez Contri (France) Adrien Gobat (United Kingdom) Emile Hudd
October 7	Monastir, Tunisia; Hard; M15; Singles and doubles draws	(Belgium) Kimmer Coppejans; 6–3, 6–2	(United States) Omni Kumar	(France) Alexandre Reco (Luxembourg) Chris Rodesch	Mikhail Gorokhov (Germany) Luca Wiedenmann (United States) Miles Jones (France) Nicolas Jadoun
October 7	Monastir, Tunisia; Hard; M15; Singles and doubles draws	(United Kingdom) Ewen Lumsden (France) Loris Pourroy; Walkover	(Luxembourg) Chris Rodesch (United States) William Woodall	(France) Alexandre Reco (Luxembourg) Chris Rodesch	Mikhail Gorokhov (Germany) Luca Wiedenmann (United States) Miles Jones (France) Nicolas Jadoun
October 14	Sharm El Sheikh, Egypt; Hard; M25; Singles and doubles draws	Ilia Simakin; 7–5, 6–3	(Czech Republic) Marek Gengel	(Latvia) Robert Strombachs (Egypt) Mohamed Safwat	(Germany) Nino Ehrenschneider (Egypt) Amr Elsayed; Egor Agafonov (Ukraine) Yurii Dzhavakian
October 14	Sharm El Sheikh, Egypt; Hard; M25; Singles and doubles draws	(Denmark) Benjamin Hannestad (Japan) Yuta Kikuchi; 1–6, 7–6^{(7–3)}, [10–2]	(Netherlands) Brian Bozemoj (Italy) Filiberto Fumagalli	(Latvia) Robert Strombachs (Egypt) Mohamed Safwat	(Germany) Nino Ehrenschneider (Egypt) Amr Elsayed; Egor Agafonov (Ukraine) Yurii Dzhavakian
October 14	Santa Margherita di Pula, Italy; Clay; M25; Singles and doubles draws	(Spain) Pol Martín Tiffon; 6–2, 7–6^{(7–5)}	(Bulgaria) Petr Nesterov	(Slovakia) Andrej Martin (Italy) Tommaso Compagnucci	(Italy) Iannis Miletich; Kirill Kivattsev (Germany) Sebastian Fanselow (Italy) Mariano Tammaro
October 14	Santa Margherita di Pula, Italy; Clay; M25; Singles and doubles draws	(Bulgaria) Yanaki Milev (Bulgaria) Petr Nesterov; 6–3, 6–3	(Italy) Massimo Giunta (Italy) Mariano Tammaro	(Slovakia) Andrej Martin (Italy) Tommaso Compagnucci	(Italy) Iannis Miletich; Kirill Kivattsev (Germany) Sebastian Fanselow (Italy) Mariano Tammaro
October 14	Sintra, Portugal; Hard; M25; Singles and doubles draws	(Portugal) Frederico Ferreira Silva; 7–5, 6–4	(Belgium) Gauthier Onclin	(United States) Alafia Ayeni (Portugal) Pedro Araújo	(Portugal) João Domingues (Portugal) Francisco Rocha (Spain) John Echevarría (Portugal) Duarte Vale
October 14	Sintra, Portugal; Hard; M25; Singles and doubles draws	(Portugal) Duarte Vale (Portugal) Tiago Pereira; 6–3, 6–3	(India) Siddhant Banthia (India) Divij Sharan	(United States) Alafia Ayeni (Portugal) Pedro Araújo	(Portugal) João Domingues (Portugal) Francisco Rocha (Spain) John Echevarría (Portugal) Duarte Vale
October 14	Edgbaston, United Kingdom; Hard (i); M25; Singles and doubles draws	(United Kingdom) Anton Matusevich; 6–2, 3–6, 7–5	(Italy) Federico Bondioli	(United Kingdom) Henry Searle (United Kingdom) Harry Wendelken	(United Kingdom) Charles Broom (Netherlands) Niels Visker (United Kingdom) Hamish Stewart (United Kingdom) James Story
October 14	Edgbaston, United Kingdom; Hard (i); M25; Singles and doubles draws	(Italy) Federico Bondioli (Germany) Daniel Masur; 6–2, 6–2	(United Kingdom) Joe Tyler (United States) Phillip Jordan	(United Kingdom) Henry Searle (United Kingdom) Harry Wendelken	(United Kingdom) Charles Broom (Netherlands) Niels Visker (United Kingdom) Hamish Stewart (United Kingdom) James Story
October 14	Harlingen, United States; Hard; M25; Singles and doubles draws	(United Kingdom) Johannus Monday; 6–0, 6–1	(Czech Republic) Tadeas Paroulek	(United States) Aidan Kim (United States) Stefan Dostanic	(United States) Toby Kodat (United States) Garrett Johns (United States) Keshav Chopra (Belgium) Pierre-Yves Bailly
October 14	Harlingen, United States; Hard; M25; Singles and doubles draws	(United States) Maxwell Benson (United States) Keshav Chopra; 4–6, 6–3, [10–6]	(United States) Strong Kirchheimer (United States) Toby Kodat	(United States) Aidan Kim (United States) Stefan Dostanic	(United States) Toby Kodat (United States) Garrett Johns (United States) Keshav Chopra (Belgium) Pierre-Yves Bailly
October 14	Tsaghkadzor, Armenia; Clay; M15; Singles and doubles draws	(Argentina) Juan Pablo Paz; 6–3, 6–4	(Hungary) Gergely Madarász	(Belgium) Martin van der Meerschen (Romania) Mihai Răzvan Marinescu	Saveliy Ivanov; Artur Kukasian; Daniil Sarksian (Czech Republic) Yvo Panak
October 14	Tsaghkadzor, Armenia; Clay; M15; Singles and doubles draws	(Spain) Álvaro Bueno Gil (Bulgaria) Dinko Dinev; 6–1, 6–4	Roman Kharlamov; Daniil Sarksian	(Belgium) Martin van der Meerschen (Romania) Mihai Răzvan Marinescu	Saveliy Ivanov; Artur Kukasian; Daniil Sarksian (Czech Republic) Yvo Panak
October 14	Bol, Croatia; Clay; M15; Singles and doubles draws	(Bosnia and Herzegovina) Andrej Nedić; 6–3, 7–6^{(7–2)}	(Ukraine) Viacheslav Bielinskyi	(Croatia) Luka Mikrut (Serbia) Miljan Zekić	(Italy) Giuseppe La Vela (Italy) Pierluigi Basile (Bosnia and Herzegovina) Mirza Bašić (Italy) Samuele Pieri
October 14	Bol, Croatia; Clay; M15; Singles and doubles draws	(Czech Republic) Jiří Čížek (Slovakia) Norbert Marošík; 6–7^{(6–8)}, 7–6^{(7–3)}, [10–4]	(Croatia) Jerko Brkić (Croatia) Karlo Kajin	(Croatia) Luka Mikrut (Serbia) Miljan Zekić	(Italy) Giuseppe La Vela (Italy) Pierluigi Basile (Bosnia and Herzegovina) Mirza Bašić (Italy) Samuele Pieri
October 14	Villers-lès-Nancy, France; Hard (i); M15; Singles and doubles draws	(France) Loann Massard; 6–1, 6–1	(France) Amaury Raynel	(France) Maxence Beauge (Luxembourg) Alex Knaff	(France) Adrien Gobat (France) Pierre Delage (France) Théo Papamalamis (France) Samuel Brosset
October 14	Villers-lès-Nancy, France; Hard (i); M15; Singles and doubles draws	(France) Yanis Ghazouani Durand (France) Loann Massard; 7–5, 6–3	(France) Samuel Brosset (France) Martin Sabas	(France) Maxence Beauge (Luxembourg) Alex Knaff	(France) Adrien Gobat (France) Pierre Delage (France) Théo Papamalamis (France) Samuel Brosset
October 14	Offenbach am Main, Germany; Hard (i); M15; Singles and doubles draws	(Germany) Mats Rosenkranz; 6–3, 7–5	(Czech Republic) Matthew William Donald	(Czech Republic) Jakub Filip (Germany) Elmar Ejupovic	(Germany) Aaron Funk (Germany) Filip Krolo (Poland) Filip Pieczonka (Germany) Vincent Marysko
October 14	Offenbach am Main, Germany; Hard (i); M15; Singles and doubles draws	(Germany) Tim Rühl (Poland) Filip Pieczonka; 5–7, 6–3, [10–4]	(Ukraine) Volodymyr Uzhylovskyi (Germany) Niklas Schell	(Czech Republic) Jakub Filip (Germany) Elmar Ejupovic	(Germany) Aaron Funk (Germany) Filip Krolo (Poland) Filip Pieczonka (Germany) Vincent Marysko
October 14	Heraklion, Greece; Hard; M15; Singles and doubles draws	(United States) Cannon Kingsley; 6–3, 7–6^{(7–4)}	(Switzerland) Adrian Bodmer	(France) Felix Balshaw (Switzerland) Johan Nikles	(Israel) Yshai Oliel (France) Nicolas Jadoun (Belgium) Jack Loge (Greece) Demetris Azoides
October 14	Heraklion, Greece; Hard; M15; Singles and doubles draws	(Switzerland) Johan Nikles (Switzerland) Adrian Bodmer; 6–2, 6–1	(Greece) Christos Antonopoulos (Greece) Michalis Sakellaridis	(France) Felix Balshaw (Switzerland) Johan Nikles	(Israel) Yshai Oliel (France) Nicolas Jadoun (Belgium) Jack Loge (Greece) Demetris Azoides
October 14	Castellón, Spain; Clay; M15; Singles and doubles draws	(Argentina) Julio César Porras; 6–4, 6–4	(Netherlands) Stijn Slump	(Switzerland) Kilian Feldbausch (Spain) Diego Augusto Barreto Sanchez	(Spain) Albert Pedrico Kravtsov (Spain) Sergi Pérez Contri (Spain) Imanol López Morillo (Spain) Max Alcalá Gurri
October 14	Castellón, Spain; Clay; M15; Singles and doubles draws	(Morocco) Younes Lalami Laaroussi (Netherlands) Stijn Paardekooper; 7–6^{(8–6)}, 7–6^{(7–3)}	(Spain) Albert Pedrico Kravtsov (Spain) Alejandro Melero Kretzer	(Switzerland) Kilian Feldbausch (Spain) Diego Augusto Barreto Sanchez	(Spain) Albert Pedrico Kravtsov (Spain) Sergi Pérez Contri (Spain) Imanol López Morillo (Spain) Max Alcalá Gurri
October 14	Monastir, Tunisia; Hard; M15; Singles and doubles draws	(Belgium) Kimmer Coppejans; 7–6^{(7–4)}, 6–2	(Italy) Fausto Tabacco	(Spain) Iñaki Montes de la Torre (Italy) Peter Buldorini	(Czech Republic) Jakub Nicod (United Kingdom) Ewen Lumsden (Germany) Sebastian Prechtel; Bogdan Bobrov
October 14	Monastir, Tunisia; Hard; M15; Singles and doubles draws	(Spain) Iñaki Montes de la Torre (Czech Republic) Jakub Nicod; 6–4, 6–3	(Poland) Olaf Pieczkowski (France) Maxence Rivet	(Spain) Iñaki Montes de la Torre (Italy) Peter Buldorini	(Czech Republic) Jakub Nicod (United Kingdom) Ewen Lumsden (Germany) Sebastian Prechtel; Bogdan Bobrov
October 14	Kayseri, Turkey; Hard; M15; Singles and doubles draws	(United States) Maxwell McKennon; 6–3, 6–2	(Colombia) Johan Alexander Rodríguez	(Netherlands) Abel Forger (Ukraine) Aleksandr Braynin	(Turkey) Cengiz Aksu (Turkey) Sarp Ağabigün (Hungary) Péter Fajta (Switzerland) Luca Castelnuovo
October 14	Kayseri, Turkey; Hard; M15; Singles and doubles draws	(Turkey) Yankı Erel (Turkey) Tuncay Duran; 3–6, 7–6^{(7–3)}, [10–7]	(Colombia) Samuel Heredia (Colombia) Johan Alexander Rodríguez	(Netherlands) Abel Forger (Ukraine) Aleksandr Braynin	(Turkey) Cengiz Aksu (Turkey) Sarp Ağabigün (Hungary) Péter Fajta (Switzerland) Luca Castelnuovo
October 14	Kampala, Uganda; Clay; M15; Singles and doubles draws	(Austria) Maximilian Neuchrist; 6–3, 6–2	(Germany) Maik Steiner	(Tunisia) Aziz Ouakaa (Burundi) Guy Orly Iradukunda	(Austria) Gregor Ramskogler (Italy) Manuel Plunger (India) Pranav Karthik (India) Dev Javia
October 14	Kampala, Uganda; Clay; M15; Singles and doubles draws	(France) Paul Barbier Gazeu (Austria) Gregor Ramskogler; 6–1, 6–1	(India) Dev Javia (India) Nitin Kumar Sinha	(Tunisia) Aziz Ouakaa (Burundi) Guy Orly Iradukunda	(Austria) Gregor Ramskogler (Italy) Manuel Plunger (India) Pranav Karthik (India) Dev Javia
October 14	Winston-Salem, United States; Hard; M15; Singles and doubles draws	(India) Dhakshineswar Suresh; 6–3, 6–7^{(4–7)}, 7–5	(United Kingdom) Luca Pow	(United States) Victor Lilov (Spain) Pedro Rodenas	(United States) Daniel Milavsky (United States) Cooper Williams (Serbia) Aleksa Ćirić (United States) Matthew Thomson
October 14	Winston-Salem, United States; Hard; M15; Singles and doubles draws	(United States) Daniel Milavsky (United States) Cooper Williams; 6–1, 6–1	(United States) Ryan Fishback (United States) Henry Lieberman	(United States) Victor Lilov (Spain) Pedro Rodenas	(United States) Daniel Milavsky (United States) Cooper Williams (Serbia) Aleksa Ćirić (United States) Matthew Thomson
October 21	Huzhou, China; Hard; M25; Singles and doubles draws	(China) Bai Yan; 6–3, 4–6, 6–2	(China) Sun Fajing	Mikalai Haliak (Japan) Ryotaro Taguchi	(Morocco) Elliot Benchetrit (China) Cui Jie (China) Xiao Linang (China) Tang Sheng
October 21	Huzhou, China; Hard; M25; Singles and doubles draws	(South Korea) Park Ui-sung (South Korea) Jeong Yeong-seok; 7–6^{(9–7)}, 6–1	(China) Li Zekai (China) Jin Yuquan	Mikalai Haliak (Japan) Ryotaro Taguchi	(Morocco) Elliot Benchetrit (China) Cui Jie (China) Xiao Linang (China) Tang Sheng
October 21	Sharm El Sheikh, Egypt; Hard; M25; Singles and doubles draws	Petr Bar Biryukov; 6–3, 5–7, 6–4	(Czech Republic) Marek Gengel	(Uzbekistan) Khumoyun Sultanov (Latvia) Robert Strombachs	(Italy) Alexandr Binda (Dominican Republic) Peter Bertran; Ilia Simakin (Egypt) Fares Zakaria
October 21	Sharm El Sheikh, Egypt; Hard; M25; Singles and doubles draws	(Serbia) Stefan Latinović; Pavel Verbin; 7–6^{(7–5)}, 7–5	(United Kingdom) Ben Jones (United Kingdom) Mark Whitehouse	(Uzbekistan) Khumoyun Sultanov (Latvia) Robert Strombachs	(Italy) Alexandr Binda (Dominican Republic) Peter Bertran; Ilia Simakin (Egypt) Fares Zakaria
October 21	Sarreguemines, France; Carpet (i); M25; Singles and doubles draws	(Belgium) Michael Geerts; 6–4, 7–5	(Ukraine) Oleg Prihodko	(France) Arthur Bouquier (Italy) Andrea Guerrieri	(France) Yanis Ghazouani Durand (France) Tom Paris (Germany) Lucas Gerch (France) Dan Added
October 21	Sarreguemines, France; Carpet (i); M25; Singles and doubles draws	(France) Axel Garcian (France) Arthur Bouquier; 6–2, 6–3	(France) Arthur Nagel (France) Dan Added	(France) Arthur Bouquier (Italy) Andrea Guerrieri	(France) Yanis Ghazouani Durand (France) Tom Paris (Germany) Lucas Gerch (France) Dan Added
October 21	Heraklion, Greece; Hard; M25; Singles and doubles draws	(Germany) Marko Topo; 7–6^{(8–6)}, 7–6^{(7–4)}	(Israel) Orel Kimhi	(United States) Cannon Kingsley (Netherlands) Niels Visker	(Sweden) Adam Heinonen (Italy) Pietro Orlando Fellin (Italy) Andrea Picchione (Greece) Pavlos Tsitsipas
October 21	Heraklion, Greece; Hard; M25; Singles and doubles draws	(Sweden) Erik Grevelius (Sweden) Adam Heinonen; 6–2, 6–4	(Poland) Filip Pieczonka (Poland) Szymon Kielan	(United States) Cannon Kingsley (Netherlands) Niels Visker	(Sweden) Adam Heinonen (Italy) Pietro Orlando Fellin (Italy) Andrea Picchione (Greece) Pavlos Tsitsipas
October 21	Santa Margherita di Pula, Italy; Clay; M25; Singles and doubles draws	(Spain) Daniel Rincón; 6–2, 6–7^{(5–7)}, 6–3	(Germany) Diego Dedura-Palomero	(Spain) Pol Martín Tiffon (Austria) Lukas Neumayer	(Bulgaria) Yanaki Milev (Spain) Carlos Sánchez Jover (Italy) Franco Agamenone (Uruguay) Joaquín Aguilar Cardozo
October 21	Santa Margherita di Pula, Italy; Clay; M25; Singles and doubles draws	(Italy) Simone Agostini (Italy) Gianluca Cadenasso; 3–6, 6–3, [10–3]	(Italy) Giorgio Ricca (Italy) Augusto Virgili	(Spain) Pol Martín Tiffon (Austria) Lukas Neumayer	(Bulgaria) Yanaki Milev (Spain) Carlos Sánchez Jover (Italy) Franco Agamenone (Uruguay) Joaquín Aguilar Cardozo
October 21	Trnava, Slovakia; Hard (i); M25; Singles and doubles draws	(Slovakia) Miloš Karol; 6–2, 6–4	(Austria) Dennis Novak	(Ukraine) Vitaliy Sachko (France) Robin Bertrand	(Ukraine) Georgii Kravchenko (Switzerland) Rémy Bertola (Czech Republic) Zdeněk Kolář; Evgeny Karlovskiy
October 21	Trnava, Slovakia; Hard (i); M25; Singles and doubles draws	(Switzerland) Rémy Bertola (Italy) Filippo Romano; 6–3, 6–3	(Slovakia) Miloš Karol (Ukraine) Vitaliy Sachko	(Ukraine) Vitaliy Sachko (France) Robin Bertrand	(Ukraine) Georgii Kravchenko (Switzerland) Rémy Bertola (Czech Republic) Zdeněk Kolář; Evgeny Karlovskiy
October 21	Glasgow, United Kingdom; Hard (i); M25; Singles and doubles draws	(Denmark) Christian Sigsgaard; 6–2, 7–6^{(7–5)}	(United Kingdom) Anton Matusevich	(United Kingdom) Harry Wendelken (Germany) Daniel Masur	(Belgium) Romain Faucon (Norway) Viktor Durasovic (France) Loic Namigandet Tenguere (United Kingdom) Liam Broady
October 21	Glasgow, United Kingdom; Hard (i); M25; Singles and doubles draws	(Norway) Lukas Hellum Lilleengen (Norway) Viktor Durasovic; 6–7^{(5–7)}, 6–2, [10–7]	(United Kingdom) Marcus Walters (United Kingdom) Alexis Canter	(United Kingdom) Harry Wendelken (Germany) Daniel Masur	(Belgium) Romain Faucon (Norway) Viktor Durasovic (France) Loic Namigandet Tenguere (United Kingdom) Liam Broady
October 21	Norman, United States; Hard (i); M25; Singles and doubles draws	(United Kingdom) Johannus Monday; 6–1, 6–3	(Canada) Juan Carlos Aguilar	(United States) Tyler Zink (United States) Stefan Dostanic	(United States) Quinn Vandecasteele (Spain) Àlex Martínez (Slovenia) Sebastian Dominko (New Zealand) Isaac Becroft
October 21	Norman, United States; Hard (i); M25; Singles and doubles draws	(Guadeloupe) Oscar Lacides (Mozambique) Bruno Nhavene; 7–6^{(7–4)}, 6–1	(Spain) Àlex Martínez (Mexico) Alan Magadán	(United States) Tyler Zink (United States) Stefan Dostanic	(United States) Quinn Vandecasteele (Spain) Àlex Martínez (Slovenia) Sebastian Dominko (New Zealand) Isaac Becroft
October 21	Tsaghkadzor, Armenia; Clay; M15; Singles and doubles draws	(Romania) Nicholas David Ionel; 6–7^{(13–15)}, 6–1, 6–2	(Hungary) Gergely Madarász	Daniil Sarksian; Artur Kukasian	Semen Pankin; Aristarkh Safonov (Romania) Mihai Răzvan Marinescu (Argentina) Juan Pablo Paz
October 21	Tsaghkadzor, Armenia; Clay; M15; Singles and doubles draws	Roman Kharlamov; Daniil Sarksian; 6–2, 6–7^{(3–7)}, [9–11]	(Argentina) Juan Pablo Paz (Germany) Marlon Vankan	Daniil Sarksian; Artur Kukasian	Semen Pankin; Aristarkh Safonov (Romania) Mihai Răzvan Marinescu (Argentina) Juan Pablo Paz
October 21	Tanagura, Japan; Hard; M15; Singles and doubles draws	(South Korea) Shin Woo-bin; 7–6^{(7–5)}, 6–3	(Japan) Ryotaro Matsumura	(Japan) Taiyo Yamanaka (Japan) Issei Okamura	(Japan) Yuta Tomida (Japan) Koki Matsuda (Japan) Daisuke Sumizawa (Japan) Yuichiro Inui
October 21	Tanagura, Japan; Hard; M15; Singles and doubles draws	(Japan) Yuichiro Inui (Japan) Yuta Kikuchi; 6–1, 6–1	(Japan) Daisuke Sumizawa (Japan) Taiyo Yamanaka	(Japan) Taiyo Yamanaka (Japan) Issei Okamura	(Japan) Yuta Tomida (Japan) Koki Matsuda (Japan) Daisuke Sumizawa (Japan) Yuichiro Inui
October 21	Monastir, Tunisia; Hard; M15; Singles and doubles draws	(Spain) Iñaki Montes de la Torre; 6–2, 1–6, 6–4	(Turkey) Altuğ Çelikbilek	(Poland) Olaf Pieczkowski (Italy) Federico Cinà	Bogdan Bobrov (France) Nicolas Jadoun (Tunisia) Anas Bennour Dit Sahli (Germany) Sebastian Prechtel
October 21	Monastir, Tunisia; Hard; M15; Singles and doubles draws	(Spain) Iñaki Montes de la Torre (France) Lucas Poullain; 5–7, 6–2, [10–5]	(Germany) John Sperle (Turkey) Altuğ Çelikbilek	(Poland) Olaf Pieczkowski (Italy) Federico Cinà	Bogdan Bobrov (France) Nicolas Jadoun (Tunisia) Anas Bennour Dit Sahli (Germany) Sebastian Prechtel
October 21	Kayseri, Turkey; Hard; M15; Singles and doubles draws	(Germany) Tom Gentzsch; 6–2, 6–4	(Bosnia and Herzegovina) Mirza Bašić	(Ukraine) Aleksandr Braynin (Turkey) Cengiz Aksu	Evgenii Tiurnev (Turkey) Yankı Erel; Valentin Kopeikin (Colombia) Johan Alexander Rodríguez
October 21	Kayseri, Turkey; Hard; M15; Singles and doubles draws	Boris Pokotilov; Evgenii Tiurnev; 3–6, 7–5, [10–3]	(Turkey) Gökberk Sarıtaş (Turkey) Mert Naci Türker	(Ukraine) Aleksandr Braynin (Turkey) Cengiz Aksu	Evgenii Tiurnev (Turkey) Yankı Erel; Valentin Kopeikin (Colombia) Johan Alexander Rodríguez
October 28	Lajeado, Brazil; Clay; M25; Singles and doubles draws	(Brazil) Matheus Pucinelli de Almeida; 6–2, 7–5	(Brazil) Daniel Dutra da Silva	(Argentina) Bautista Vilicich (Chile) Matías Soto	(Brazil) João Lucas Reis da Silva (Argentina) Tomás Farjat (Argentina) Juan Estévez (Argentina) Lautaro Midón
October 28	Lajeado, Brazil; Clay; M25; Singles and doubles draws	(Argentina) Juan Manuel La Serna (Argentina) Lautaro Midón; 2–6, 6–4, [10–3]	(Argentina) Juan Bautista Otegui (Argentina) Lorenzo Joaquin Rodriguez	(Argentina) Bautista Vilicich (Chile) Matías Soto	(Brazil) João Lucas Reis da Silva (Argentina) Tomás Farjat (Argentina) Juan Estévez (Argentina) Lautaro Midón
October 28	Qiandaohu, China; Hard; M25; Singles and doubles draws	(Morocco) Elliot Benchetrit; 6–3, 6–2	(China) Sun Fajing	(Chinese Taipei) Huang Tsung-hao; Aliaksandr Liaonenka	(China) Xiao Linang (China) Mo Yecong (China) Pang Renlong (Chinese Taipei) Lee Kuan-yi
October 28	Qiandaohu, China; Hard; M25; Singles and doubles draws	(China) Sun Fajing (China) Te Rigele; 6–3, 3–6, [10–3]	(China) Zheng Baoluo (Chinese Taipei) Hsieh Cheng-peng	(Chinese Taipei) Huang Tsung-hao; Aliaksandr Liaonenka	(China) Xiao Linang (China) Mo Yecong (China) Pang Renlong (Chinese Taipei) Lee Kuan-yi
October 28	Heraklion, Greece; Hard; M25; Singles and doubles draws	(United Kingdom) Ryan Peniston; 6–4, 6–1	(France) Louis Dussin	(Switzerland) Dominic Stricker (Israel) Orel Kimhi	(Norway) Nicolai Budkov Kjær (Israel) Amit Vales (Ukraine) Oleksandr Ovcharenko (Germany) Marko Topo
October 28	Heraklion, Greece; Hard; M25; Singles and doubles draws	(Sweden) Erik Grevelius (Sweden) Adam Heinonen; 7–6^{(7–2)}, 2–6, [10–7]	(Romania) Cezar Crețu (Romania) Bogdan Pavel	(Switzerland) Dominic Stricker (Israel) Orel Kimhi	(Norway) Nicolai Budkov Kjær (Israel) Amit Vales (Ukraine) Oleksandr Ovcharenko (Germany) Marko Topo
October 28	Monastir, Tunisia; Hard; M25; Singles and doubles draws	(Belgium) Kimmer Coppejans; 7–5, 6–2	(Italy) Francesco Maestrelli	Nikolay Vylegzhanin (Portugal) Frederico Ferreira Silva	(Poland) Kacper Szymkowiak (France) Clément Tabur (Czech Republic) Jakub Nicod (France) Sascha Gueymard Wayenburg
October 28	Monastir, Tunisia; Hard; M25; Singles and doubles draws	(United Kingdom) Finn Bass (Czech Republic) Jakub Nicod; 3–6, 6–1, [10–8]	(United States) Gabriel Evans (United States) Jackson Ross	Nikolay Vylegzhanin (Portugal) Frederico Ferreira Silva	(Poland) Kacper Szymkowiak (France) Clément Tabur (Czech Republic) Jakub Nicod (France) Sascha Gueymard Wayenburg
October 28	Norwich, United Kingdom; Hard (i); M25; Singles and doubles draws	(France) Clément Chidekh; 6–3, 7–6^{(8–6)}	(United Kingdom) Stuart Parker	(France) Dan Added (United Kingdom) Charles Broom	(United Kingdom) Tom Hands (United Kingdom) Ewen Lumsden (Belgium) Michael Geerts (United Kingdom) James Story
October 28	Norwich, United Kingdom; Hard (i); M25; Singles and doubles draws	(Belgium) Michael Geerts (Estonia) Johannes Seeman; 6–3, 6–4	(United Kingdom) Conor Brady (United Kingdom) Luke Hooper	(France) Dan Added (United Kingdom) Charles Broom	(United Kingdom) Tom Hands (United Kingdom) Ewen Lumsden (Belgium) Michael Geerts (United Kingdom) James Story
October 28	Sharm El Sheikh, Egypt; Hard; M15; Singles and doubles draws	Petr Bar Biryukov; 7–5, 6–4	(Sweden) Leo Borg	(Egypt) Michael Bassem Sobhy (Ukraine) Yurii Dzhavakian	Evgeny Philippov; Yaraslav Shyla (Italy) Alexandr Binda (United States) Michael Zhu
October 28	Sharm El Sheikh, Egypt; Hard; M15; Singles and doubles draws	Evgenii Tiurnev; Daniil Golubev; Walkover	(Dominican Republic) Peter Bertran (United States) Mwendwa Mbithi	(Egypt) Michael Bassem Sobhy (Ukraine) Yurii Dzhavakian	Evgeny Philippov; Yaraslav Shyla (Italy) Alexandr Binda (United States) Michael Zhu
October 28	Szabolcsveresmart, Hungary; Hard (i); M15; Singles and doubles draws	(Hungary) Péter Fajta; 7–6^{(7–5)}, 6–3	(Austria) Neil Oberleitner	(France) Maé Malige (Romania) Rareș Teodor Pieleanu	(Czech Republic) Zdeněk Kolář (Czech Republic) Dominik Kellovský (Sweden) Nikola Slavic (Poland) Kacper Żuk
October 28	Szabolcsveresmart, Hungary; Hard (i); M15; Singles and doubles draws	(Ukraine) Illya Beloborodko (Czech Republic) Jan Jermář; 1–6, 7–6^{(7–5)}, [10–7]	(Finland) Vesa Ahti (Finland) Peetu Pohjola	(France) Maé Malige (Romania) Rareș Teodor Pieleanu	(Czech Republic) Zdeněk Kolář (Czech Republic) Dominik Kellovský (Sweden) Nikola Slavic (Poland) Kacper Żuk
October 28	Sëlva Gardena, Italy; Hard (i); M15; Singles and doubles draws	(Italy) Giovanni Oradini; 2–6, 6–3, 7–6^{(9–7)}	(Italy) Andrea Guerrieri	(Italy) Luca Castagnola (Italy) Michele Ribecai	(Italy) Pietro Orlando Fellin (Finland) Oskari Paldanius (Italy) Niccolò Catini (Italy) Alberto Morolli
October 28	Sëlva Gardena, Italy; Hard (i); M15; Singles and doubles draws	(Italy) Pietro Orlando Fellin (Italy) Christian Fellin; 6–4, 4–6, [10–7]	(Finland) Oskari Paldanius (Italy) Leonardo Cattaneo	(Italy) Luca Castagnola (Italy) Michele Ribecai	(Italy) Pietro Orlando Fellin (Finland) Oskari Paldanius (Italy) Niccolò Catini (Italy) Alberto Morolli
October 28	Yanagawa, Japan; Hard; M15; Singles and doubles draws	(South Africa) Philip Henning; 7–6^{(7–1)}, 6–1	(Japan) Yuta Kikuchi	(Japan) Yuta Kawahashi (South Korea) Oh Chan-yeong	(Japan) Shion Itsusaki (Japan) Taiyo Yamanaka (Japan) Kosuke Shibano (Japan) Shinji Hazawa
October 28	Yanagawa, Japan; Hard; M15; Singles and doubles draws	(Japan) Sho Katayama (Japan) Yuhei Kono; 6–4, 6–2	(Japan) Kazuma Kawachi (Japan) Koki Matsuda	(Japan) Yuta Kawahashi (South Korea) Oh Chan-yeong	(Japan) Shion Itsusaki (Japan) Taiyo Yamanaka (Japan) Kosuke Shibano (Japan) Shinji Hazawa
October 28	Monastir, Tunisia; Hard; M15; Singles and doubles draws	(France) Lucas Poullain; 6–1, 6–3	(France) Sean Cuenin	(France) Lilian Marmousez (Turkey) Altuğ Çelikbilek	(France) Alexandre Reco; Svyatoslav Gulin (Germany) Lasse Pörtner (Italy) Federico Bondioli
October 28	Monastir, Tunisia; Hard; M15; Singles and doubles draws	(France) Maxence Beaugé (France) Mathieu Scaglia; 6–1, 4–6, [11–9]	(Germany) Mika Petkovic (Germany) Lasse Pörtner	(France) Lilian Marmousez (Turkey) Altuğ Çelikbilek	(France) Alexandre Reco; Svyatoslav Gulin (Germany) Lasse Pörtner (Italy) Federico Bondioli
October 28	Kayseri, Turkey; Hard; M15; Singles and doubles draws	(Ukraine) Aleksandr Braynin; 3–6, 6–0, 7–6^{(7–2)}	Semen Pankin	(Germany) Kai Wehnelt (United Kingdom) Matthew Summers	(Germany) Tom Gentzsch (United States) Tristan Stringer (Colombia) Johan Alexander Rodríguez (Colombia) Salvador Price
October 28	Kayseri, Turkey; Hard; M15; Singles and doubles draws	(Turkey) Gökberk Sarıtaş (Turkey) Mert Naci Türker; 6–2, 7–6^{(11–9)}	(Ukraine) Aleksandr Braynin (Ukraine) Mykyta Riepkin	(Germany) Kai Wehnelt (United Kingdom) Matthew Summers	(Germany) Tom Gentzsch (United States) Tristan Stringer (Colombia) Johan Alexander Rodríguez (Colombia) Salvador Price

=== November ===
Week of	Tournament	Winner	Runners-up	Semifinalists	Quarterfinalists
November 4	Saint-Augustin-de-Desmaures, Canada; Hard (i); M25; Singles and doubles draws	(Canada) Liam Draxl; 6–1, 6–3	(Canada) Alexis Galarneau	(Canada) Jaden Weekes (Germany) Mats Rosenkranz	(Canada) Juan Carlos Aguilar (Czech Republic) Filip Duda (Belgium) Michael Geerts (United States) Felix Corwin
November 4	Saint-Augustin-de-Desmaures, Canada; Hard (i); M25; Singles and doubles draws	(Czech Republic) Filip Duda (Czech Republic) David Poljak; 6–4, 6–7^{(4–7)}, [11–9]	(United States) Alfredo Perez (United States) Jamie Vance	(Canada) Jaden Weekes (Germany) Mats Rosenkranz	(Canada) Juan Carlos Aguilar (Czech Republic) Filip Duda (Belgium) Michael Geerts (United States) Felix Corwin
November 4	Heraklion, Greece; Hard; M25; Singles and doubles draws	(France) Gabriel Debru; 3–6, 6–4, 6–2	(Switzerland) Rémy Bertola	(Belgium) Gauthier Onclin; Ilia Simakin	(Ukraine) Oleksandr Ovcharenko (Colombia) Adrià Soriano Barrera (Romania) Cezar Crețu (Ukraine) Oleksii Krutykh
November 4	Heraklion, Greece; Hard; M25; Singles and doubles draws	(Poland) Szymon Kielan (Poland) Filip Pieczonka; 4–6, 6–3, [10–7]	(Luxembourg) Alex Knaff; Ilia Simakin	(Belgium) Gauthier Onclin; Ilia Simakin	(Ukraine) Oleksandr Ovcharenko (Colombia) Adrià Soriano Barrera (Romania) Cezar Crețu (Ukraine) Oleksii Krutykh
November 4	Bhubaneswar, India; Hard; M25; Singles and doubles draws	(Czech Republic) Dalibor Svrčina; 6–2, 6–0	(United States) Nick Chappell	(India) Aryan Shah; Bogdan Bobrov	(India) Dev Javia (India) Rethin Pranav Senthil Kumar (India) Karan Singh (India) S D Prajwal Dev
November 4	Bhubaneswar, India; Hard; M25; Singles and doubles draws	Egor Agafonov; Bogdan Bobrov; 6–4, 6–3	(India) Rishab Agarwal (India) Kabir Hans	(India) Aryan Shah; Bogdan Bobrov	(India) Dev Javia (India) Rethin Pranav Senthil Kumar (India) Karan Singh (India) S D Prajwal Dev
November 4	Maputo, Mozambique; Hard; M25; Singles and doubles draws	(Ivory Coast) Eliakim Coulibaly; 5–7, 6–3, 6–4	(Czech Republic) Dominik Palán	(Poland) Olaf Pieczkowski (South Africa) Alec Beckley	(Australia) Oliver Anderson (South Africa) Dylan Salton (Switzerland) Luca Castelnuovo (Tunisia) Aziz Ouakaa
November 4	Maputo, Mozambique; Hard; M25; Singles and doubles draws	(South Africa) Alec Beckley (South Africa) Vasilios Caripi; 6–3, 6–4	(Ghana) Abraham Asaba (Ghana) Isaac Nortey	(Poland) Olaf Pieczkowski (South Africa) Alec Beckley	(Australia) Oliver Anderson (South Africa) Dylan Salton (Switzerland) Luca Castelnuovo (Tunisia) Aziz Ouakaa
November 4	Monastir, Tunisia; Hard; M25; Singles and doubles draws	(Belgium) Kimmer Coppejans; 7–5, 5–7, 6–2	(Turkey) Altuğ Çelikbilek	(France) Kenny de Schepper (Algeria) Toufik Sahtali	Nikolay Vylegzhanin (Italy) Francesco Maestrelli (Portugal) Tiago Pereira (Italy) Pietro Pampanin
November 4	Monastir, Tunisia; Hard; M25; Singles and doubles draws	(France) Kenny de Schepper (Portugal) Tiago Pereira; 6–2, 6–1	(United States) Dali Blanch (United States) Keshav Chopra	(France) Kenny de Schepper (Algeria) Toufik Sahtali	Nikolay Vylegzhanin (Italy) Francesco Maestrelli (Portugal) Tiago Pereira (Italy) Pietro Pampanin
November 4	Recife, Brazil; Clay (i); M15; Singles and doubles draws	(Chile) Matías Soto; 6–4, 6–2	(Brazil) Eduardo Ribeiro	(Brazil) Enzo Kohlmann de Freitas (Argentina) Bautista Vilicich	(Argentina) Juan Estévez (Argentina) Juan Manuel La Serna (Argentina) Guido Iván Justo (Brazil) Gustavo Ribeiro de Almeida
November 4	Recife, Brazil; Clay (i); M15; Singles and doubles draws	(Brazil) João Victor Couto Loureiro (Brazil) Gilbert Soares Klier Júnior; 6–3, 6–4	(Brazil) Kaue Noatto (Brazil) Eduardo Ribeiro	(Brazil) Enzo Kohlmann de Freitas (Argentina) Bautista Vilicich	(Argentina) Juan Estévez (Argentina) Juan Manuel La Serna (Argentina) Guido Iván Justo (Brazil) Gustavo Ribeiro de Almeida
November 4	Sharm El Sheikh, Egypt; Hard; M15; Singles and doubles draws	(Italy) Alexandr Binda; 6–3, 7–6^{(7–4)}	(Ukraine) Yurii Dzhavakian	Ivan Nedelko (Poland) Marcel Kamrowski	(Germany) Oscar Moraing (Germany) Niklas Schell (Egypt) Amr Elsayed (Estonia) Kristjan Tamm
November 4	Sharm El Sheikh, Egypt; Hard; M15; Singles and doubles draws	Artur Kukasian; Ruslan Tiukaev; 7–5, 6–3	(Germany) Oscar Moraing (Germany) Niklas Schell	Ivan Nedelko (Poland) Marcel Kamrowski	(Germany) Oscar Moraing (Germany) Niklas Schell (Egypt) Amr Elsayed (Estonia) Kristjan Tamm
November 4	Guatemala City, Guatemala; Hard; M15; Singles and doubles draws	(United States) Evan Zhu; 6–3, 4–6, 6–4	(Mexico) Rodrigo Pacheco Méndez	(France) Leo Raquin (Colombia) Miguel Tobón	(United States) Andrew Fenty (Japan) Leo Vithoontien (Japan) Kosuke Ogura (United States) Tristan McCormick
November 4	Guatemala City, Guatemala; Hard; M15; Singles and doubles draws	(United States) Andrew Fenty (United States) Tristan McCormick; 6–2, 6–3	(Chile) Benjamín Torrealba (Chile) Nicolás Villalón	(France) Leo Raquin (Colombia) Miguel Tobón	(United States) Andrew Fenty (Japan) Leo Vithoontien (Japan) Kosuke Ogura (United States) Tristan McCormick
November 4	Szabolcsveresmart, Hungary; Hard (i); M15; Singles and doubles draws	(France) Tom Paris; 6–3, 6–1	(Sweden) Olle Wallin	(Bosnia and Herzegovina) Andrej Nedić (Austria) Neil Oberleitner	(Slovenia) Filip Jeff Planinšek (Hungary) Gábor Humong (Hungary) Rafael Kis Balázs (Hungary) Péter Fajta
November 4	Szabolcsveresmart, Hungary; Hard (i); M15; Singles and doubles draws	(Ukraine) Illya Beloborodko (Czech Republic) Jan Jermář; 6–3, 6–4	(Ukraine) Nikita Mashtakov (France) Matt Ponchet	(Bosnia and Herzegovina) Andrej Nedić (Austria) Neil Oberleitner	(Slovenia) Filip Jeff Planinšek (Hungary) Gábor Humong (Hungary) Rafael Kis Balázs (Hungary) Péter Fajta
November 4	San Gregorio di Catania, Italy; Clay; M15; Singles and doubles draws	(Italy) Gianluca Cadenasso; 6–4, 7–5	(Italy) Gabriele Piraino	(Italy) Gabriele Pennaforti; Kirill Kivattsev	(Czech Republic) Petr Brunclík (Italy) Carlo Alberto Caniato (Italy) Mariano Tammaro (Italy) Lorenzo Giustino
November 4	San Gregorio di Catania, Italy; Clay; M15; Singles and doubles draws	(Italy) Carlo Alberto Caniato (Italy) Fabio De Michele; 6–4, 6–7^{(3–7)}, [10–4]	(Italy) Niccolò Catini (Italy) Giuseppe La Vela	(Italy) Gabriele Pennaforti; Kirill Kivattsev	(Czech Republic) Petr Brunclík (Italy) Carlo Alberto Caniato (Italy) Mariano Tammaro (Italy) Lorenzo Giustino
November 4	Monastir, Tunisia; Hard; M15; Singles and doubles draws	(France) Maxence Beauge; 6–4, 6–3	(Czech Republic) Matthew William Donald	(Germany) Sebastian Prechtel (France) Maxence Rivet	(France) Luc Fomba (France) Charles Bertimon (Netherlands) Jarno Jans (Italy) Stefano D'Agostino
November 4	Monastir, Tunisia; Hard; M15; Singles and doubles draws	Svyatoslav Gulin (Slovakia) Lukáš Pokorný; 6–3, 6–4	(Senegal) Seydina André (France) Luc Fomba	(Germany) Sebastian Prechtel (France) Maxence Rivet	(France) Luc Fomba (France) Charles Bertimon (Netherlands) Jarno Jans (Italy) Stefano D'Agostino
November 4	Antalya, Turkey; Clay; M15; Singles and doubles draws	Evgenii Tiurnev; 6–1, 6–7^{(4–7)}, 7–5	(Romania) Filip Cristian Jianu	(Romania) Nicholas David Ionel (Romania) Gabi Adrian Boitan	(Moldova) Ilya Snițari (Serbia) Stefan Popović (Morocco) Reda Bennani (Turkey) Kuzey Çekirge
November 4	Antalya, Turkey; Clay; M15; Singles and doubles draws	(Romania) Gabi Adrian Boitan (Romania) Alexandru Cristian Dumitru; 0–6, 7–5, [10–7]	(Germany) Tim Handel (Serbia) Stefan Popović	(Romania) Nicholas David Ionel (Romania) Gabi Adrian Boitan	(Moldova) Ilya Snițari (Serbia) Stefan Popović (Morocco) Reda Bennani (Turkey) Kuzey Çekirge
November 11	Brisbane QTC Tennis International; Brisbane, Australia; Hard; M25; Singles and doubles draws	(Australia) Blake Ellis; 6–1, 6–3	(Australia) Blake Mott	(United States) Christian Langmo (Australia) Jason Kubler	(United States) Joshua Sheehy (Australia) Jake Delaney (New Zealand) Alexander Klintcharov (Australia) Matthew Dellavedova
November 11	Brisbane QTC Tennis International; Brisbane, Australia; Hard; M25; Singles and doubles draws	(Northern Mariana Islands) Colin Sinclair (Australia) Brandon Walkin; 7–6^{(7–3)}, 6–3	(Australia) Joshua Charlton (United Kingdom) Emile Hudd	(United States) Christian Langmo (Australia) Jason Kubler	(United States) Joshua Sheehy (Australia) Jake Delaney (New Zealand) Alexander Klintcharov (Australia) Matthew Dellavedova
November 11	São Paulo, Brazil; Clay; M25; Singles and doubles draws	(France) Mathys Erhard; 6–3, 6–3	(Chile) Matías Soto	(Peru) Gonzalo Bueno (Brazil) Eduardo Ribeiro	(Argentina) Valentín Basel (Brazil) João Eduardo Schiessl (Argentina) Guido Iván Justo (Chile) Daniel Antonio Núñez
November 11	São Paulo, Brazil; Clay; M25; Singles and doubles draws	(Argentina) Valentín Basel (Argentina) Lautaro Agustin Falabella; 6–3, 6–2	(Argentina) Bautista Vilicich (Argentina) Ignacio Monzón	(Peru) Gonzalo Bueno (Brazil) Eduardo Ribeiro	(Argentina) Valentín Basel (Brazil) João Eduardo Schiessl (Argentina) Guido Iván Justo (Chile) Daniel Antonio Núñez
November 11	Mumbai, India; Hard; M25; Singles and doubles draws	(Czech Republic) Dalibor Svrčina; 3–6, 6–1, 6–2	(Uzbekistan) Khumoyun Sultanov	Bogdan Bobrov (India) Karan Singh	(United States) Adhithya Ganesan (India) Nitin Kumar Sinha (India) Vishnu Vardhan; Egor Agafonov
November 11	Mumbai, India; Hard; M25; Singles and doubles draws	(India) S D Prajwal Dev (India) Adil Kalyanpur; 6–4, 4–6, [10–7]	(United States) Adhithya Ganesan (India) Aryan Shah	Bogdan Bobrov (India) Karan Singh	(United States) Adhithya Ganesan (India) Nitin Kumar Sinha (India) Vishnu Vardhan; Egor Agafonov
November 11	Vale do Lobo, Portugal; Hard; M25; Singles and doubles draws	(Portugal) Frederico Ferreira Silva; 6–4, 6–2	(Portugal) Pedro Araújo	(Norway) Viktor Durasovic (Switzerland) Andrin Casanova	(Spain) Andrés Fernández Cánovas (Portugal) Francisco Rocha (Portugal) Diogo Marques (Belgium) Gauthier Onclin
November 11	Vale do Lobo, Portugal; Hard; M25; Singles and doubles draws	(Spain) Iván Marrero Curbelo (United Kingdom) Mark Whitehouse; 7–5, 6–3	(Portugal) Pedro Araújo (United Kingdom) Finn Bass	(Norway) Viktor Durasovic (Switzerland) Andrin Casanova	(Spain) Andrés Fernández Cánovas (Portugal) Francisco Rocha (Portugal) Diogo Marques (Belgium) Gauthier Onclin
November 11	Columbus, United States; Hard (i); M25; Singles and doubles draws	(United States) Aidan Kim; 7–5, 6–1	(Greece) Aristotelis Thanos	(Australia) Derek Pham (United States) Samir Banerjee	(United States) Bryce Nakashima (United States) Jack Anthrop (United Kingdom) William Jansen (Switzerland) Jeffrey von der Schulenburg
November 11	Columbus, United States; Hard (i); M25; Singles and doubles draws	(United States) Jack Anthrop (United States) Bryce Nakashima; 6–3, 6–2	(United Kingdom) Adam Jones (United States) Jake Van Emburgh	(Australia) Derek Pham (United States) Samir Banerjee	(United States) Bryce Nakashima (United States) Jack Anthrop (United Kingdom) William Jansen (Switzerland) Jeffrey von der Schulenburg
November 11	Sharm El Sheikh, Egypt; Hard; M15; Singles and doubles draws	(Egypt) Mohamed Safwat; 6–3, 6–2	(Serbia) Nikola Milojević	Evgeny Philippov (Ukraine) Yurii Dzhavakian	(Czech Republic) Marek Gengel (Italy) Filippo Speziali (France) Cyril Vandermeersch (Serbia) Stefan Latinović
November 11	Sharm El Sheikh, Egypt; Hard; M15; Singles and doubles draws	(Czech Republic) Jan Hrazdil (Czech Republic) Denis Peták; 6–7^{(4–7)}, 6–3, [10–3]	(Serbia) Stefan Latinović (Chinese Taipei) Lo Yi-jui	Evgeny Philippov (Ukraine) Yurii Dzhavakian	(Czech Republic) Marek Gengel (Italy) Filippo Speziali (France) Cyril Vandermeersch (Serbia) Stefan Latinović
November 11	Heraklion, Greece; Hard; M15; Singles and doubles draws	(Colombia) Adrià Soriano Barrera; 7–5, 5–7, 6–3	(Ukraine) Oleksii Krutykh	(France) Guillaume Dalmasso (Italy) Lorenzo Carboni	Ilia Simakin (Netherlands) Niels Lootsma (Belgium) Emilien Demanet (France) François Musitelli
November 11	Heraklion, Greece; Hard; M15; Singles and doubles draws	(France) Felix Balshaw (Italy) Lorenzo Carboni; 4–6, 6–2, [10–8]	(Luxembourg) Alex Knaff; Ilia Simakin	(France) Guillaume Dalmasso (Italy) Lorenzo Carboni	Ilia Simakin (Netherlands) Niels Lootsma (Belgium) Emilien Demanet (France) François Musitelli
November 11	Guatemala City, Guatemala; Hard; M15; Singles and doubles draws	(United States) Evan Zhu; 7–6^{(10–8)}, 6–4	(United States) Tristan McCormick	(Brazil) Paulo André Saraiva dos Santos (Canada) Joshua Peck	(Venezuela) Ricardo Rodríguez-Pace (France) Leo Raquin (Venezuela) Brandon Pérez (United States) Alexander Stater
November 11	Guatemala City, Guatemala; Hard; M15; Singles and doubles draws	(Venezuela) Juan José Bianchi (Venezuela) Brandon Pérez; 2–6, 7–6^{(7–4)}, [10–8]	(France) Leo Raquin (Czech Republic) Ondřej Horák	(Brazil) Paulo André Saraiva dos Santos (Canada) Joshua Peck	(Venezuela) Ricardo Rodríguez-Pace (France) Leo Raquin (Venezuela) Brandon Pérez (United States) Alexander Stater
November 11	San Gregorio di Catania, Italy; Clay; M15; Singles and doubles draws	(Spain) Àlex Martí Pujolràs; Walkover	(Italy) Gabriele Pennaforti	(Italy) Fausto Tabacco (Italy) Federico Iannaccone	(Italy) Luca Potenza (Italy) Carlo Alberto Caniato (Italy) Edoardo Zanada (Italy) Alexander Weis
November 11	San Gregorio di Catania, Italy; Clay; M15; Singles and doubles draws	(Italy) Niccolò Catini (Italy) Noah Perfetti; Walkover	(Czech Republic) Petr Brunclík (Hungary) Gergely Madarász	(Italy) Fausto Tabacco (Italy) Federico Iannaccone	(Italy) Luca Potenza (Italy) Carlo Alberto Caniato (Italy) Edoardo Zanada (Italy) Alexander Weis
November 11	Morelia, Mexico; Hard; M15; Singles and doubles draws	(Mexico) Rodrigo Pacheco Méndez; 7–5, 6–1	(United States) Jacob Brumm	(United States) Maxwell McKennon (France) Antoine Berger	(Colombia) Juan Sebastián Osorio (Mexico) Rodrigo Alujas (Turkey) Arda Azkara (Netherlands) Jim Hendrikx
November 11	Morelia, Mexico; Hard; M15; Singles and doubles draws	(Mexico) Daniel Moreno (Mexico) Alan Fernando Rubio Fierros; 7–5, 3–6, [11–9]	(Turkey) Arda Azkara (United States) Isaiah Strode	(United States) Maxwell McKennon (France) Antoine Berger	(Colombia) Juan Sebastián Osorio (Mexico) Rodrigo Alujas (Turkey) Arda Azkara (Netherlands) Jim Hendrikx
November 11	Valencia, Spain; Clay; M15; Singles and doubles draws	(Spain) Pol Martín Tiffon; 6–2, 6–2	(Spain) Max Alcalá Gurri	(Spain) Miguel Damas (Spain) Nikolás Sánchez Izquierdo	(Bulgaria) Alexander Donski (Spain) Sergi Pérez Contri (Spain) Alejandro Manzanera Pertusa (Spain) Alejo Sánchez Quílez
November 11	Valencia, Spain; Clay; M15; Singles and doubles draws	(Bulgaria) Alexander Donski (Spain) Bruno Pujol Navarro; 6–4, 6–2	(Chile) Diego Fernández Flores (Spain) Mario Mansilla Díez	(Spain) Miguel Damas (Spain) Nikolás Sánchez Izquierdo	(Bulgaria) Alexander Donski (Spain) Sergi Pérez Contri (Spain) Alejandro Manzanera Pertusa (Spain) Alejo Sánchez Quílez
November 11	Monastir, Tunisia; Hard; M15; Singles and doubles draws	(Turkey) Ergi Kırkın; 5–7, 6–4, 6–2	(Germany) Lasse Pörtner	(France) Kenny de Schepper (Germany) Tom Gentzsch	Mikalai Haliak (France) Maxence Bertimon (United States) Sekou Bangoura (United Kingdom) Jeremy Gschwendtner
November 11	Monastir, Tunisia; Hard; M15; Singles and doubles draws	Igor Kudriashov (Italy) Daniele Rapagnetta; 7–6^{(7–5)}, 2–6, [10–7]	(United States) Keshav Chopra (France) Luc Fomba	(France) Kenny de Schepper (Germany) Tom Gentzsch	Mikalai Haliak (France) Maxence Bertimon (United States) Sekou Bangoura (United Kingdom) Jeremy Gschwendtner
November 11	Antalya, Turkey; Clay; M15; Singles and doubles draws	(Romania) Nicholas David Ionel; 6–1, 7–5	(Belgium) Martin van der Meerschen	(Germany) John Sperle (Romania) Dan Alexandru Tomescu	(Germany) Tim Handel (Turkey) Kuzey Çekirge (Romania) Gabi Adrian Boitan (Serbia) Stefan Popović
November 11	Antalya, Turkey; Clay; M15; Singles and doubles draws	(Germany) Tim Handel (Serbia) Stefan Popović; 6–3, 6–2	(Bulgaria) Yanaki Milev (Bulgaria) Petr Nesterov	(Germany) John Sperle (Romania) Dan Alexandru Tomescu	(Germany) Tim Handel (Turkey) Kuzey Çekirge (Romania) Gabi Adrian Boitan (Serbia) Stefan Popović
November 11	Boca Raton, United States; Clay; M15; Singles and doubles draws	(United States) Stefan Dostanic; 6–4, 6–2	Ilgiz Valiev	(United States) Benjamin Willwerth (United States) William Grant	(Dominican Republic) Peter Bertran (United States) Miles Jones (United States) Mwendwa Mbithi (Sweden) Arvid Nordquist
November 11	Boca Raton, United States; Clay; M15; Singles and doubles draws	(Argentina) Jeremías Rocco (Argentina) Santiago Villarruel; 4–6, 7–5, [10–6]	(United States) Alex Jones (United States) Miles Jones	(United States) Benjamin Willwerth (United States) William Grant	(Dominican Republic) Peter Bertran (United States) Miles Jones (United States) Mwendwa Mbithi (Sweden) Arvid Nordquist
November 18	Caloundra, Australia; Hard; M25; Singles and doubles draws	(United States) Christian Langmo; 7–6^{(7–4)}, 1–6, 6–4	(New Zealand) Ajeet Rai	(Japan) Yuki Mochizuki (Australia) Matthew Dellavedova	(Australia) Blake Ellis (Australia) Kody Pearson (Australia) Hayden Jones (Australia) Edward Winter
November 18	Caloundra, Australia; Hard; M25; Singles and doubles draws	(Australia) Jake Delaney (Australia) Jesse Delaney; 6–3, 6–3	(Australia) Joshua Charlton (United Kingdom) Emile Hudd	(Japan) Yuki Mochizuki (Australia) Matthew Dellavedova	(Australia) Blake Ellis (Australia) Kody Pearson (Australia) Hayden Jones (Australia) Edward Winter
November 18	Kalaburagi, India; Hard; M25; Singles and doubles draws	(Uzbekistan) Khumoyun Sultanov; 6–2, 6–1	Bogdan Bobrov	(India) Dev Javia (United States) Nick Chappell	Maxim Zhukov (India) Sidharth Rawat (India) Karan Singh (India) Aryan Shah
November 18	Kalaburagi, India; Hard; M25; Singles and doubles draws	Egor Agafonov; Bogdan Bobrov; 7–5, 6–2	(United States) Nick Chappell (India) Nitin Kumar Sinha	(India) Dev Javia (United States) Nick Chappell	Maxim Zhukov (India) Sidharth Rawat (India) Karan Singh (India) Aryan Shah
November 18	Austin, United States; Hard; M25; Singles and doubles draws	(United States) Stefan Dostanic; 6–3, 7–6^{(7–4)}	(Belgium) Pierre Yves Bailly	(United Kingdom) Alastair Gray (Portugal) Duarte Vale	(United States) Evan Burnett (France) Romain Gales (United States) Patrick Maloney (United Kingdom) Max Basing
November 18	Austin, United States; Hard; M25; Singles and doubles draws	(Belgium) Pierre Yves Bailly (United States) Stefan Dostanic; 7–5, 6–3	(Canada) Cleeve Harper (Australia) Patrick Harper	(United Kingdom) Alastair Gray (Portugal) Duarte Vale	(United States) Evan Burnett (France) Romain Gales (United States) Patrick Maloney (United Kingdom) Max Basing
November 18	Antalya, Turkey; Clay; M25; Singles and doubles draws	(Bosnia and Herzegovina) Nerman Fatić; 7–5, 6–4	(Italy) Manuel Mazza	(Romania) Nicholas David Ionel (Romania) Dan Alexandru Tomescu	(Italy) Franco Agamenone; Andrey Chepelev (Bulgaria) Petr Nesterov (Germany) Tim Handel
November 18	Antalya, Turkey; Clay; M25; Singles and doubles draws	(Poland) Szymon Kielan (Poland) Filip Pieczonka; 7–6^{(10–8)}, 6–3	(Turkey) Tuncay Duran (Turkey) Gökberk Sarıtaş	(Romania) Nicholas David Ionel (Romania) Dan Alexandru Tomescu	(Italy) Franco Agamenone; Andrey Chepelev (Bulgaria) Petr Nesterov (Germany) Tim Handel
November 18	Vale do Lobo, Portugal; Hard; M25; Singles and doubles draws	(Belgium) Gauthier Onclin; 7–5, 6–1	(Portugal) Frederico Ferreira Silva	(Portugal) Pedro Araújo (Spain) John Echeverría	(Spain) Mario González Fernández (Norway) Viktor Durasovic (Portugal) Tiago Pereira (Romania) Ștefan Paloși
November 18	Vale do Lobo, Portugal; Hard; M25; Singles and doubles draws	(Portugal) Pedro Araújo (United Kingdom) Finn Bass; 6–4, 3–6, [10–4]	(United Kingdom) Tom Hands (United Kingdom) Harry Wendelken	(Portugal) Pedro Araújo (Spain) John Echeverría	(Spain) Mario González Fernández (Norway) Viktor Durasovic (Portugal) Tiago Pereira (Romania) Ștefan Paloși
November 18	Monastir, Tunisia; Hard; M25; Singles and doubles draws	(United Kingdom) Ryan Peniston; 6–0, 6–1	(Italy) Federico Iannaccone	Marat Sharipov (Turkey) Yankı Erel	(Turkey) Ergi Kırkın; Nikolay Vylegzhanin (France) Leo Deflandre (Slovakia) Martin Kližan
November 18	Monastir, Tunisia; Hard; M25; Singles and doubles draws	(Slovakia) Lukáš Pokorný; Marat Sharipov; Walkover	(Turkey) Yankı Erel (Croatia) Admir Kalender	Marat Sharipov (Turkey) Yankı Erel	(Turkey) Ergi Kırkın; Nikolay Vylegzhanin (France) Leo Deflandre (Slovakia) Martin Kližan
November 18	Luanda, Angola; Hard; M15; Singles and doubles draws	(Australia) Oliver Anderson; 6–4, 3–6, 7–6^{(7–5)}	(Latvia) Robert Strombachs	(Poland) Alan Bojarski (India) Chirag Duhan	(Italy) Matteo Covato (Senegal) Seydina André (Austria) Gregor Ramskogler (Czech Republic) Dominik Palán
November 18	Luanda, Angola; Hard; M15; Singles and doubles draws	(Latvia) Robert Strombachs (Germany) Kai Wehnelt; 6–3, 6–7^{(5–7)}, [10–7]	(Austria) Gregor Ramskogler (Poland) Jasza Szajrych	(Poland) Alan Bojarski (India) Chirag Duhan	(Italy) Matteo Covato (Senegal) Seydina André (Austria) Gregor Ramskogler (Czech Republic) Dominik Palán
November 18	Santo Domingo, Dominican Republic; Hard; M15; Singles and doubles draws	(Dominican Republic) Roberto Cid Subervi; 7–5, 6–3	(Canada) Juan Carlos Aguilar	(United States) Miles Jones (United States) Alexander Stater	(United States) Andrew Fenty (Canada) Benjamin Thomas George (Netherlands) Brian Bozemoj (United States) Ronald Hohmann
November 18	Santo Domingo, Dominican Republic; Hard; M15; Singles and doubles draws	(Netherlands) Brian Bozemoj (United States) Billy Suarez; 6–3, 6–4	(United States) Ronald Hohmann (United States) Oren Vasser	(United States) Miles Jones (United States) Alexander Stater	(United States) Andrew Fenty (Canada) Benjamin Thomas George (Netherlands) Brian Bozemoj (United States) Ronald Hohmann
November 18	Sharm El Sheikh, Egypt; Hard; M15; Singles and doubles draws	(Egypt) Fares Zakaria; 7–6^{(7–5)}, 3–6, 6–4	(Czech Republic) Marek Gengel	(Italy) Alexandr Binda (Ukraine) Vadym Ursu	(Poland) Filip Peliwo (Estonia) Oliver Ojakäär (Japan) Yuta Kikuchi; Evgeny Philippov
November 18	Sharm El Sheikh, Egypt; Hard; M15; Singles and doubles draws	(Serbia) Stefan Latinović (Chinese Taipei) Lo Yi-jui; 4–6, 6–3, [10–4]	(Czech Republic) Marek Gengel (Czech Republic) Daniel Blažka	(Italy) Alexandr Binda (Ukraine) Vadym Ursu	(Poland) Filip Peliwo (Estonia) Oliver Ojakäär (Japan) Yuta Kikuchi; Evgeny Philippov
November 18	Heraklion, Greece; Hard; M15; Singles and doubles draws	(Colombia) Adrià Soriano Barrera; 2–6, 6–3, 6–0	(Ukraine) Vladyslav Orlov	(Cyprus) Menelaos Efstathiou (Ukraine) Oleksii Krutykh	(France) Pablo Trochu (Belgium) Émilien Demanet (Greece) Pavlos Tsitsipas (Romania) Luca Preda
November 18	Heraklion, Greece; Hard; M15; Singles and doubles draws	(Greece) Christos Antonopoulos (Greece) Petros Tsitsipas; 6–2, 6–1	(Cyprus) Menelaos Efstathiou (Cyprus) Eleftherios Neos	(Cyprus) Menelaos Efstathiou (Ukraine) Oleksii Krutykh	(France) Pablo Trochu (Belgium) Émilien Demanet (Greece) Pavlos Tsitsipas (Romania) Luca Preda
November 18	Huamantla, Mexico; Hard; M15; Singles and doubles draws	(Zimbabwe) Benjamin Lock; 6–4, 6–4	(Turkey) Arda Azkara	(United States) Drew Van Orderlain (United States) Isaiah Strode	(Canada) Alvin Nicholas Tudorica (United States) Jacob Brumm (Japan) Kosuke Ogura (Mexico) Alan Fernando Rubio Fierros
November 18	Huamantla, Mexico; Hard; M15; Singles and doubles draws	(United States) Elijah Strode (United States) Isaiah Strode; 6–7^{(5–7)}, 6–2, [13–11]	(Turkey) Arda Azkara (Canada) Alvin Nicholas Tudorica	(United States) Drew Van Orderlain (United States) Isaiah Strode	(Canada) Alvin Nicholas Tudorica (United States) Jacob Brumm (Japan) Kosuke Ogura (Mexico) Alan Fernando Rubio Fierros
November 18	Alcalá de Henares, Spain; Hard; M15; Singles and doubles draws	(France) Tom Paris; 6–3, 7–5	(Italy) Pierluigi Basile	(Denmark) Kane Bonsach Ganley (Spain) Diego Augusto Barreto Sánchez	(China) Charles Chen (Spain) Iván Marrero Curbelo (France) Pierre Delage (Spain) Sergi Pérez Contri
November 18	Alcalá de Henares, Spain; Hard; M15; Singles and doubles draws	(Ukraine) Illya Beloborodko (Czech Republic) Jan Jermář; 5–7, 6–3, [10–8]	(Spain) Alejandro García Carbajal (Spain) Mario Mansilla Díez	(Denmark) Kane Bonsach Ganley (Spain) Diego Augusto Barreto Sánchez	(China) Charles Chen (Spain) Iván Marrero Curbelo (France) Pierre Delage (Spain) Sergi Pérez Contri
November 18	Azul, Argentina; Clay; M15; Singles and doubles draws	(Argentina) Lorenzo Joaquín Rodríguez; 6–3, 6–3	(Argentina) Alex Barrena	(Argentina) Juan Estévez (United States) Alex Kuperstein	(Argentina) Guido Iván Justo (Argentina) Ignacio Monzón (Brazil) Gustavo Ribeiro de Almeida (Argentina) Ezequiel Monferrer
November 18	Azul, Argentina; Clay; M15; Singles and doubles draws	(Argentina) Mateo del Pino (United States) Alex Kuperstein; 4–6, 7–6^{(7–4)}, [10–8]	(Argentina) Santiago de la Fuente (Argentina) Lautaro Agustin Falabella	(Argentina) Juan Estévez (United States) Alex Kuperstein	(Argentina) Guido Iván Justo (Argentina) Ignacio Monzón (Brazil) Gustavo Ribeiro de Almeida (Argentina) Ezequiel Monferrer
November 18	Monastir, Tunisia; Hard; M15; Singles and doubles draws	(Italy) Federico Bondioli; 7–6^{(7–2)}, 3–6, 6–4	(United Kingdom) Ewen Lumsden	(Slovenia) Filip Jeff Planinšek (Netherlands) Elgin Khoeblal	(France) Maxence Rivet (Japan) Taiyo Yamanaka (France) Antoine Vincent (Germany) Max Schönhaus
November 18	Monastir, Tunisia; Hard; M15; Singles and doubles draws	(Belgium) Louis Herman (Belgium) Nicolas Ifi; 6–1, 7–5	(Italy) Gregorio Biondolillo (Italy) Alessio Demichelis	(Slovenia) Filip Jeff Planinšek (Netherlands) Elgin Khoeblal	(France) Maxence Rivet (Japan) Taiyo Yamanaka (France) Antoine Vincent (Germany) Max Schönhaus
November 18	Tallahassee, United States; Clay; M15; Singles and doubles draws	(United States) Daniel Milavsky; 6–3, 6–2	(United States) Jack Anthrop	(Japan) Leo Vithoontien (United States) William Grant	(United States) Roberto Ferrer Guimaraes (France) Robin Catry (United States) Jelani Sarr (United States) Tristan McCormick
November 18	Tallahassee, United States; Clay; M15; Singles and doubles draws	(Germany) Tim Rühl (Germany) Patrick Zahraj; 6–2, 5–7, [10–8]	(United States) Tristan McCormick (Sweden) Fred Simonsson	(Japan) Leo Vithoontien (United States) William Grant	(United States) Roberto Ferrer Guimaraes (France) Robin Catry (United States) Jelani Sarr (United States) Tristan McCormick
November 25	Gold Coast Tennis International; Carrara, Australia; Hard; M25; Singles and doubles draws	(Australia) Matthew Dellavedova; 3–6, 6–3, 6–2	(Australia) Jason Kubler	(Australia) Moerani Bouzige (United Kingdom) Emile Hudd	(Australia) Thomas Braithwaite (Australia) Jake Delaney (United States) Christian Langmo (Australia) Hayden Jones
November 25	Gold Coast Tennis International; Carrara, Australia; Hard; M25; Singles and doubles draws	(Australia) Joshua Charlton (United Kingdom) Emile Hudd; 7–6^{(7–5)}, 6–3	(Japan) Daisuke Sumizawa (Japan) Issei Okamura	(Australia) Moerani Bouzige (United Kingdom) Emile Hudd	(Australia) Thomas Braithwaite (Australia) Jake Delaney (United States) Christian Langmo (Australia) Hayden Jones
November 25	Monastir, Tunisia; Hard; M25; Singles and doubles draws	(Belgium) Gauthier Onclin; 6–4, 2–6, 7–5	(Italy) Lorenzo Giustino	(Slovakia) Martin Kližan (France) Robin Bertrand	(Slovakia) Lukáš Pokorný (Italy) Federico Iannaccone (United Kingdom) Ryan Peniston (Ivory Coast) Eliakim Coulibaly
November 25	Monastir, Tunisia; Hard; M25; Singles and doubles draws	(Bulgaria) Alexander Donski (Spain) Bruno Pujol Navarro; 7–6^{(7–4)}, 4–6, [10–5]	(Tunisia) Aziz Ouakaa (Slovakia) Lukáš Pokorný	(Slovakia) Martin Kližan (France) Robin Bertrand	(Slovakia) Lukáš Pokorný (Italy) Federico Iannaccone (United Kingdom) Ryan Peniston (Ivory Coast) Eliakim Coulibaly
November 25	Antalya, Turkey; Clay; M25; Singles and doubles draws	(Switzerland) Mika Brunold; 6–2, 7–6^{(9–7)}	(Norway) Nicolai Budkov Kjær	(Italy) Facundo Juárez; Svyatoslav Gulin	(Romania) Cezar Crețu (Czech Republic) Zdeněk Kolář (Romania) Dan Alexandru Tomescu (Netherlands) Stijn Slump
November 25	Antalya, Turkey; Clay; M25; Singles and doubles draws	(Italy) Franco Agamenone (Italy) Facundo Juárez; 7–6^{(7–3)}, 6–1	(Bulgaria) Georgi Georgiev; Ivan Gretskiy	(Italy) Facundo Juárez; Svyatoslav Gulin	(Romania) Cezar Crețu (Czech Republic) Zdeněk Kolář (Romania) Dan Alexandru Tomescu (Netherlands) Stijn Slump
November 25	Luanda, Angola; Hard; M15; Singles and doubles draws	(Latvia) Robert Strombachs; 6–3, 6–2	(Czech Republic) Dominik Palán	(Germany) Kai Wehnelt (Austria) Gregor Ramskogler	(India) Chirag Duhan (Germany) Yannik Kelm (Poland) Jasza Szajrych (Poland) Alan Bojarski
November 25	Luanda, Angola; Hard; M15; Singles and doubles draws	(Latvia) Robert Strombachs (Germany) Kai Wehnelt; 6–1, 6–1	(Austria) Gregor Ramskogler (Poland) Jasza Szajrych	(Germany) Kai Wehnelt (Austria) Gregor Ramskogler	(India) Chirag Duhan (Germany) Yannik Kelm (Poland) Jasza Szajrych (Poland) Alan Bojarski
November 25	Santiago, Chile; Clay; M15; Singles and doubles draws	(Argentina) Alex Barrena; 3–6, 6–2, 6–0	(Peru) Christopher Li	(Argentina) Lautaro Agustin Falabella (Argentina) Juan Estévez	(Chile) Nicolás Bruna (Chile) Daniel Antonio Núñez (Chile) Ignacio Antonio Becerra Otarola (Chile) Nicolás Villalón
November 25	Santiago, Chile; Clay; M15; Singles and doubles draws	(Argentina) Leonardo Aboian (Argentina) Ignacio Monzón; 6–4, 6–2	(Chile) Miguel Ángel Cabrera (Brazil) Enzo Kohlmann de Freitas	(Argentina) Lautaro Agustin Falabella (Argentina) Juan Estévez	(Chile) Nicolás Bruna (Chile) Daniel Antonio Núñez (Chile) Ignacio Antonio Becerra Otarola (Chile) Nicolás Villalón
November 25	Santo Domingo, Dominican Republic; Hard; M15; Singles and doubles draws	(Canada) Juan Carlos Aguilar; 6–4, 4–6, 6–4	(Dominican Republic) Roberto Cid Subervi	(Italy) Andrea Fiorentini (United States) Miles Jones	(United States) Adhithya Ganesan (United States) Alexander Stater (Canada) Taha Baadi (Spain) Ignasi Forcano
November 25	Santo Domingo, Dominican Republic; Hard; M15; Singles and doubles draws	(United States) Billy Suarez (Greece) Ioannis Xilas; 2–6, 7–5, [10–7]	(Italy) Andrea Fiorentini (Italy) Massimo Ocera	(Italy) Andrea Fiorentini (United States) Miles Jones	(United States) Adhithya Ganesan (United States) Alexander Stater (Canada) Taha Baadi (Spain) Ignasi Forcano
November 25	Sharm El Sheikh, Egypt; Hard; M15; Singles and doubles draws	(Czech Republic) Marek Gengel; 3–6, 6–4, 6–3	(Ukraine) Vadym Ursu	(Italy) Leonardo Rossi; Evgeny Philippov	Aristarkh Safonov; Daniil Ostapenkov (Serbia) Stefan Latinović (Hungary) Péter Fajta
November 25	Sharm El Sheikh, Egypt; Hard; M15; Singles and doubles draws	(Japan) Yuta Kikuchi (Japan) Yamato Sueoka; 6–2, 6–3	(Estonia) Markus Mölder (Estonia) Oliver Ojakäär	(Italy) Leonardo Rossi; Evgeny Philippov	Aristarkh Safonov; Daniil Ostapenkov (Serbia) Stefan Latinović (Hungary) Péter Fajta
November 25	Huamantla, Mexico; Hard; M15; Singles and doubles draws	(Canada) Alvin Nicholas Tudorica; 7–6^{(7–4)}, 6–4	(United States) Isaiah Strode	(United States) Elijah Strode (United States) Jacob Brumm	(Norway) Leyton Rivera (Colombia) Nicolás Buitrago (United States) Ezekiel Clark (Ukraine) Aleksandr Braynin
November 25	Huamantla, Mexico; Hard; M15; Singles and doubles draws	(Venezuela) Juan José Bianchi (Venezuela) Brandon Pérez; 6–1, 7–6^{(7–4)}	(United States) Alexander Brown (United States) Ezekiel Clark	(United States) Elijah Strode (United States) Jacob Brumm	(Norway) Leyton Rivera (Colombia) Nicolás Buitrago (United States) Ezekiel Clark (Ukraine) Aleksandr Braynin
November 25	Luján, Argentina; Clay; M15; Singles and doubles draws	(Argentina) Hernán Casanova; 6–3, 6–1	(Brazil) Gustavo Ribeiro de Almeida	(Italy) Andres Gabriel Ciurletti (Argentina) Juan Manuel La Serna	(Argentina) Mateo Del Pino (Uruguay) Joaquín Aguilar Cardozo (Argentina) Dante Pagani (Argentina) Thiago Cigarrán
November 25	Luján, Argentina; Clay; M15; Singles and doubles draws	(Uruguay) Federico Aguilar Cardozo (Uruguay) Joaquín Aguilar Cardozo; 6–2, 6–3	(Argentina) Mateo del Pino (Argentina) Juan Manuel La Serna	(Italy) Andres Gabriel Ciurletti (Argentina) Juan Manuel La Serna	(Argentina) Mateo Del Pino (Uruguay) Joaquín Aguilar Cardozo (Argentina) Dante Pagani (Argentina) Thiago Cigarrán
November 25	Madrid, Spain; Hard; M15; Singles and doubles draws	(Bulgaria) Iliyan Radulov; 6–4, 7–5	(United States) Darwin Blanch	(France) Adan Freire Da Silva (Argentina) Julio César Porras	(Spain) Sergi Pérez Contri (Italy) Andrea Guerrieri (Ukraine) Georgii Kravchenko (Germany) Marko Topo
November 25	Madrid, Spain; Hard; M15; Singles and doubles draws	(Ukraine) Illya Beloborodko (Czech Republic) Jan Jermář; 6–1, 6–1	(France) Adan Freire Da Silva (France) Yanis Ghazouani Durand	(France) Adan Freire Da Silva (Argentina) Julio César Porras	(Spain) Sergi Pérez Contri (Italy) Andrea Guerrieri (Ukraine) Georgii Kravchenko (Germany) Marko Topo
November 25	Monastir, Tunisia; Hard; M15; Singles and doubles draws	(Turkey) Yankı Erel; 6–0, 6–4	(Italy) Luca Potenza	(Turkey) Altuğ Çelikbilek (United Kingdom) Ewen Lumsden	(Italy) Pietro Marino (Japan) Taiyo Yamanaka (France) Cyril Vandermeersch (France) Dan Added
November 25	Monastir, Tunisia; Hard; M15; Singles and doubles draws	(Czech Republic) Matyáš Černý (Czech Republic) Jonáš Kučera; 6–2, 2–6, [11–9]	(Croatia) Nikola Bašić (Croatia) Admir Kalender	(Turkey) Altuğ Çelikbilek (United Kingdom) Ewen Lumsden	(Italy) Pietro Marino (Japan) Taiyo Yamanaka (France) Cyril Vandermeersch (France) Dan Added

=== December ===
Week of	Tournament	Winner	Runners-up	Semifinalists	Quarterfinalists
December 2	Santiago, Chile; Clay; M15; Singles and doubles draws	(Argentina) Guido Iván Justo; 0–6, 7–6^{(7–3)}, 6–0	(Chile) Matías Soto	(Argentina) Santiago de la Fuente (Greece) Stefanos Sakellaridis	(Germany) Diego Dedura-Palomero (Argentina) Alex Barrena (Argentina) Ignacio Monzón (Argentina) Juan Estévez
December 2	Santiago, Chile; Clay; M15; Singles and doubles draws	(Chile) Ignacio Antonio Becerra Otárola (Chile) Daniel Antonio Núñez; 6–2, 6–2	(Chile) Miguel Ángel Cabrera (Argentina) Thiago Cigarrán	(Argentina) Santiago de la Fuente (Greece) Stefanos Sakellaridis	(Germany) Diego Dedura-Palomero (Argentina) Alex Barrena (Argentina) Ignacio Monzón (Argentina) Juan Estévez
December 2	Sharm El Sheikh, Egypt; Hard; M15; Singles and doubles draws	(Czech Republic) Marek Gengel; 6–4, 6–0	Ilia Simakin	(Italy) Alexandr Binda (Ukraine) Vadym Ursu	(Poland) Filip Peliwo; Evgeny Philippov (Ukraine) Yurii Dzhavakian (Egypt) Mohamed Safwat
December 2	Sharm El Sheikh, Egypt; Hard; M15; Singles and doubles draws	Daniil Ostapenkov; Erik Arutiunian; 6–1, 6–2	(Italy) Alexandr Binda; Evgeny Philippov	(Italy) Alexandr Binda (Ukraine) Vadym Ursu	(Poland) Filip Peliwo; Evgeny Philippov (Ukraine) Yurii Dzhavakian (Egypt) Mohamed Safwat
December 2	Huamantla, Mexico; Hard; M15; Singles and doubles draws	(Canada) Liam Draxl; 6–4, 6–1	(Ukraine) Aleksandr Braynin	(United States) Keegan Smith (Germany) Elmar Ejupovic	(Japan) Kosuke Ogura (United States) Evan Zhu (United States) Adhithya Ganesan (Canada) Alvin Nicholas Tudorica
December 2	Huamantla, Mexico; Hard; M15; Singles and doubles draws	(United Kingdom) Stefan Cooper (United States) Noah Schachter; 6–3, 7–6^{(7–5)}	(United States) Andrew Fenty (United States) Garrett Johns	(United States) Keegan Smith (Germany) Elmar Ejupovic	(Japan) Kosuke Ogura (United States) Evan Zhu (United States) Adhithya Ganesan (Canada) Alvin Nicholas Tudorica
December 2	Stellenbosch, South Africa; Hard; M15; Singles and doubles draws	(South Africa) Philip Henning; 6–4, 6–1	(Germany) Nino Ehrenschneider	(Netherlands) Niels Visker (South Africa) Kris van Wyk	(Venezuela) Gonzalo Oliveira (South Africa) Alec Beckley (Australia) Oliver Anderson (South Africa) Dylan Salton
December 2	Stellenbosch, South Africa; Hard; M15; Singles and doubles draws	(Netherlands) Niels Lootsma (Netherlands) Niels Visker; 2–6, 6–3, [12–10]	(Germany) Nino Ehrenschneider (Japan) Yuta Kikuchi	(Netherlands) Niels Visker (South Africa) Kris van Wyk	(Venezuela) Gonzalo Oliveira (South Africa) Alec Beckley (Australia) Oliver Anderson (South Africa) Dylan Salton
December 2	Madrid, Spain; Clay; M15; Singles and doubles draws	(Netherlands) Michiel De Krom; 7–6^{(7–4)}, 6–3	(Bulgaria) Iliyan Radulov	(Spain) Sergi Pérez Contri (Spain) Tomás Currás Abasolo	(France) Maxime Janvier (Netherlands) Ryan Nijboer (Italy) Iannis Miletich (Spain) Pablo Masjuan Ginel
December 2	Madrid, Spain; Clay; M15; Singles and doubles draws	(Spain) Alvaro Bueno Gil (Italy) Iannis Miletich; 6–4, 6–4	(Spain) Alejandro Melero Kretzer (Spain) Sergio Planella Hernández	(Spain) Sergi Pérez Contri (Spain) Tomás Currás Abasolo	(France) Maxime Janvier (Netherlands) Ryan Nijboer (Italy) Iannis Miletich (Spain) Pablo Masjuan Ginel
December 2	Antalya, Turkey; Clay; M15; Singles and doubles draws	(Switzerland) Kilian Feldbausch; 6–3, 6–4	Evgenii Tiurnev	(Bosnia and Herzegovina) Andrej Nedić; Svyatoslav Gulin	(Czech Republic) Vít Kalina (Romania) Ștefan Adrian Andreescu (Ukraine) Oleksii Krutykh (Romania) Nicholas David Ionel
December 2	Antalya, Turkey; Clay; M15; Singles and doubles draws	(Italy) Niccolò Catini (Italy) Fabio De Michele; 7–5, 6–4	Daniil Golubev; Evgenii Tiurnev	(Bosnia and Herzegovina) Andrej Nedić; Svyatoslav Gulin	(Czech Republic) Vít Kalina (Romania) Ștefan Adrian Andreescu (Ukraine) Oleksii Krutykh (Romania) Nicholas David Ionel
December 9	Sharm El Sheikh, Egypt; Hard; M15; Singles and doubles draws	(Czech Republic) Marek Gengel; 6–1, 6–1	Ilia Simakin	(Egypt) Mohamed Safwat (Italy) Alexandr Binda	(Greece) Dimitris Sakellaridis (Greece) Ioannis Kountourakis (China) Zhao Lingxi (United Kingdom) Stuart Parker
December 9	Sharm El Sheikh, Egypt; Hard; M15; Singles and doubles draws	Ilia Simakin (Canada) Kelsey Stevenson; 7–5, 6–4	(Czech Republic) Jan Hrazdil (Czech Republic) David Poljak	(Egypt) Mohamed Safwat (Italy) Alexandr Binda	(Greece) Dimitris Sakellaridis (Greece) Ioannis Kountourakis (China) Zhao Lingxi (United Kingdom) Stuart Parker
December 9	Wellington, New Zealand; Hard; M15; Singles and doubles draws	(New Zealand) Ajeet Rai; 6–4, 6–2	(Australia) Tai Sach	(United States) Matt Kuhar (Australia) Moerani Bouzige	(Australia) Ethan Cook (New Zealand) Jack Loutit (United States) Ryan Fishback (Japan) Jay Dylan Hara Friend
December 9	Wellington, New Zealand; Hard; M15; Singles and doubles draws	(New Zealand) Isaac Becroft (New Zealand) Ajeet Rai; 6–1, 6–3	(Australia) Tai Sach (New Zealand) Anton Shepp	(United States) Matt Kuhar (Australia) Moerani Bouzige	(Australia) Ethan Cook (New Zealand) Jack Loutit (United States) Ryan Fishback (Japan) Jay Dylan Hara Friend
December 9	Huamantla, Mexico; Hard; M15; Singles and doubles draws	(United States) Alafia Ayeni; 7–6^{(7–3)}, 6–3	(Dominican Republic) Peter Bertran	(United States) Keegan Smith (United States) Garrett Johns	(United States) Noah Schachter (United States) Adhithya Ganesan (United States) Elijah Strode (United States) Evan Zhu
December 9	Huamantla, Mexico; Hard; M15; Singles and doubles draws	(Dominican Republic) Peter Bertran (United States) Mwendwa Mbithi; 7–6^{(8–6)}, 6–3	(United States) Elijah Strode (United States) Isaiah Strode	(United States) Keegan Smith (United States) Garrett Johns	(United States) Noah Schachter (United States) Adhithya Ganesan (United States) Elijah Strode (United States) Evan Zhu
December 9	Doha, Qatar; Hard; M15; Singles and doubles draws	(France) Arthur Géa; 7–5, 6–3	(Italy) Giovanni Fonio	(Serbia) Nikola Milojević (United Kingdom) Ryan Peniston	(Belgium) Tibo Colson (Finland) Eero Vasa (Greece) Pavlos Tsitsipas; Savriyan Danilov
December 9	Doha, Qatar; Hard; M15; Singles and doubles draws	(Denmark) Philip Hjorth (Denmark) Christian Sigsgaard; 5–7, 7–5, [10–4]	(Germany) Adrian Oetzbach (Finland) Eero Vasa	(Serbia) Nikola Milojević (United Kingdom) Ryan Peniston	(Belgium) Tibo Colson (Finland) Eero Vasa (Greece) Pavlos Tsitsipas; Savriyan Danilov
December 9	Stellenbosch, South Africa; Hard; M15; Singles and doubles draws	(South Africa) Philip Henning; 6–4, 6–4	(South Africa) Kris Van Wyk	(Japan) Yuta Kikuchi (South Africa) Alec Beckley	(Australia) Oliver Anderson (Netherlands) Niels Visker (France) Hugo Pierre (Netherlands) Niels Lootsma
December 9	Stellenbosch, South Africa; Hard; M15; Singles and doubles draws	(Ghana) Abraham Asaba (Italy) Lorenzo Lorusso; 6–4, 6–3	(South Africa) Alec Beckley (South Africa) Vasilios Caripi	(Japan) Yuta Kikuchi (South Africa) Alec Beckley	(Australia) Oliver Anderson (Netherlands) Niels Visker (France) Hugo Pierre (Netherlands) Niels Lootsma
December 9	Antalya, Turkey; Clay; M15; Singles and doubles draws	Svyatoslav Gulin; 7–6^{(7–3)}, 6–4	(Ukraine) Oleksii Krutykh	(Italy) Franco Agamenone (Italy) Tommaso Compagnucci	(Italy) Lorenzo Angelini (France) Lucas Bouquet (Moldova) Ilya Snițari (Italy) Facundo Juárez
December 9	Antalya, Turkey; Clay; M15; Singles and doubles draws	(Italy) Niccolò Ciavarella (Italy) Fabio de Michele; 5–7, 7–5, [10–5]	(Italy) Niccolò Catini (Italy) Tommaso Compagnucci	(Italy) Franco Agamenone (Italy) Tommaso Compagnucci	(Italy) Lorenzo Angelini (France) Lucas Bouquet (Moldova) Ilya Snițari (Italy) Facundo Juárez
December 9	Ceuta, Spain; Hard; M15; Singles and doubles draws	(Latvia) Robert Strombachs; 6–2, 6–3	(France) Mathias Bourgue	(Portugal) Tiago Pereira (Spain) Mario González Fernández	(Canada) Steven Diez (Ukraine) Vladyslav Orlov (Spain) Iván Marrero Curbelo (Spain) John Echeverría
December 9	Ceuta, Spain; Hard; M15; Singles and doubles draws	(Spain) Carlos Divar (Spain) Mario González Fernández; 2–6, 6–4, [10–6]	(Spain) John Echeverría (Portugal) Tiago Pereira	(Portugal) Tiago Pereira (Spain) Mario González Fernández	(Canada) Steven Diez (Ukraine) Vladyslav Orlov (Spain) Iván Marrero Curbelo (Spain) John Echeverría
December 16	Bali, Indonesia; Hard; M15; Singles and doubles draws	(Japan) Renta Tokuda; 7–6^{(8–6)}, 6–3	(France) Arthur Weber	(South Korea) Lee Duck-hee (Australia) Chen Dong	(Switzerland) Luca Castelnuovo (Indonesia) Muhammad Rifqi Fitriadi (Greece) Stefanos Sakellaridis (China) Chen Xing Dao
December 16	Bali, Indonesia; Hard; M15; Singles and doubles draws	(Chinese Taipei) Hsieh Cheng-peng (China) Yang Zijiang; 1–6, 6–3, [10–5]	(Australia) Joshua Charlton (Chinese Taipei) Lo Yi-jui	(South Korea) Lee Duck-hee (Australia) Chen Dong	(Switzerland) Luca Castelnuovo (Indonesia) Muhammad Rifqi Fitriadi (Greece) Stefanos Sakellaridis (China) Chen Xing Dao
December 16	Tauranga, New Zealand; Hard; M15; Singles and doubles draws	(Australia) Moerani Bouzige; 7–5, 6–4	(Japan) Jay Dylan Hara Friend	(Australia) Matthew Dellavedova (New Zealand) Isaac Becroft	(New Zealand) Alexander Klintcharov (New Zealand) Jack Loutit (Australia) Jake Delaney (Australia) Casey Hoole
December 16	Tauranga, New Zealand; Hard; M15; Singles and doubles draws	(New Zealand) Corban Crowther (New Zealand) Alexander Klintcharov; 6–4, 6–3	(Australia) Ethan Cook (Australia) Jesse Delaney	(Australia) Matthew Dellavedova (New Zealand) Isaac Becroft	(New Zealand) Alexander Klintcharov (New Zealand) Jack Loutit (Australia) Jake Delaney (Australia) Casey Hoole
December 16	Doha, Qatar; Hard; M15; Singles and doubles draws	(France) Arthur Géa; 6–4, 6–0	Savriyan Danilov	(Denmark) Philip Hjorth (United Kingdom) Ryan Peniston	(Denmark) Christian Sigsgaard (France) Arthur Bonnaud (United Kingdom) Matthew Summers (Luxembourg) Alex Knaff
December 16	Doha, Qatar; Hard; M15; Singles and doubles draws	(United Kingdom) Tom Hands (United Kingdom) Matthew Summers; 6–2, 6–2	(France) Arthur Bonnaud (France) Paul Valsecchi	(Denmark) Philip Hjorth (United Kingdom) Ryan Peniston	(Denmark) Christian Sigsgaard (France) Arthur Bonnaud (United Kingdom) Matthew Summers (Luxembourg) Alex Knaff
December 16	Antalya, Turkey; Clay; M15; Singles and doubles draws	(Italy) Franco Agamenone; 6–2, 6–4	(France) Arthur Reymond	(Serbia) Simeon Stanković (Ukraine) Nikita Mashtakov	(Serbia) Branko Đurić (Italy) Tommaso Compagnucci (Romania) Dragoș Nicolae Cazacu (France) Lucas Bouquet
December 16	Antalya, Turkey; Clay; M15; Singles and doubles draws	(Italy) Enrico Baldisserri (Italy) Manuel Mazza; 6–1, 6–3	(Italy) Giannicola Misasi (Colombia) Daniel Salazar	(Serbia) Simeon Stanković (Ukraine) Nikita Mashtakov	(Serbia) Branko Đurić (Italy) Tommaso Compagnucci (Romania) Dragoș Nicolae Cazacu (France) Lucas Bouquet
December 23	Denpasar, Indonesia; Hard; M15; Singles and doubles draws	(Japan) Hayato Matsuoka; 6–4, 5–7, 6–2	(France) Arthur Weber	(Australia) Joshua Charlton (Switzerland) Luca Castelnuovo	(Malaysia) Mitsuki Wei Kang Leong (Estonia) Kristjan Tamm (United Kingdom) Emile Hudd (Japan) Shunsuke Nakagawa
December 23	Denpasar, Indonesia; Hard; M15; Singles and doubles draws	(Japan) Yusuke Kusuhara (Japan) Shunsuke Nakagawa; 6–2, 0–1 ret.	(Switzerland) Luca Castelnuovo (China) Wang Aoran	(Australia) Joshua Charlton (Switzerland) Luca Castelnuovo	(Malaysia) Mitsuki Wei Kang Leong (Estonia) Kristjan Tamm (United Kingdom) Emile Hudd (Japan) Shunsuke Nakagawa
December 23	Antalya, Turkey; Clay; M15; Singles and doubles draws	Singles and doubles competition was cancelled due to ongoing poor weather			
