= Alexander Frusina =

American tennis player (born 2005)

- Country (sports): United States
- Born: December 17, 2005 (age 20) Houston, Texas, US
- Height: 1.80 m (5 ft 11 in)
- Plays: Right-handed (two-handed backhand)
- Prize money: US $23,471

Singles
- Career record: 0–0 (at ATP Tour level, Grand Slam level, and in Davis Cup)
- Career titles: 0
- Highest ranking: No. 1,125 (July 27, 2026)
- Current ranking: No. 1,261 (November 9, 2026)

Doubles
- Career record: 0–1 (at ATP Tour level, Grand Slam level, and in Davis Cup)
- Career titles: 0
- Highest ranking: No. 980 (November 9, 2026)
- Current ranking: No. 980 (November 9, 2026)

Grand Slam doubles results
- US Open: 1R (2023)
- Last updated on: November 9, 2026.

Alexander Robert Frusina (born December 17, 2005) is an American tennis player. He has a career-high ATP singles ranking of No. 1,125 achieved on July 27, 2026 and a doubles ranking of No. 980 achieved on November 9, 2026.

== Professional career ==
Frusina made his Slam major debut at the 2023 US Open. He received a wildcard into the men's doubles main draw with Adhithya Ganesan, after they won the USTA boys' doubles national championship.
