= 2023 US Open – Men's doubles =

Men's doubles
- 2023 US Open

Final
- Champions: (United States) Rajeev Ram (United Kingdom) Joe Salisbury
- Runners-up: (India) Rohan Bopanna (Australia) Matthew Ebden
- Score: 2–6, 6–3, 6–4

Details
- Draw: 64
- Seeds: 16

Events
Singles	men	women		boys	girls
Doubles	men	women	mixed	boys	girls
WC Singles	men	women	quad	boys	girls
WC Doubles	men	women	quad	boys	girls
- US Open

Two-time defending champions Rajeev Ram and Joe Salisbury defeated Rohan Bopanna and Matthew Ebden in the final, 2–6, 6–3, 6–4 to win the men's doubles tennis title at the 2023 US Open. They became the first team to win three consecutive US Open titles in the Open Era.

At 43 years and six months, Bopanna was the oldest men's doubles major finalist in the Open Era, surpassing Daniel Nestor's record of 43 years and four months from the 2016 Australian Open.

Austin Krajicek regained the world No. 1 doubles ranking at the end of the tournament after Neal Skupski lost in the third round.

This marked the last professional appearance of former world No. 1 players and multiple-time major champions Robert Farah and Juan Sebastián Cabal; they lost in the second round. It was also the last professional appearance Olympic gold medalist and four-time major doubles champion Jack Sock, who lost in the first round.

== Seeds ==
1. (Netherlands) Wesley Koolhof / (United Kingdom) Neal Skupski (third round)
2. (Croatia) Ivan Dodig / (United States) Austin Krajicek (semifinals)
3. (United States) Rajeev Ram / (United Kingdom) Joe Salisbury (champions)
4. (El Salvador) Marcelo Arévalo / (Netherlands) Jean-Julien Rojer (third round)
5. (Argentina) Máximo González / (Argentina) Andrés Molteni (quarterfinals)
6. (India) Rohan Bopanna / (Australia) Matthew Ebden (final)
7. (Mexico) Santiago González / (France) Édouard Roger-Vasselin (third round)
8. (Spain) Marcel Granollers / (Argentina) Horacio Zeballos (third round)
9. (Monaco) Hugo Nys / (Poland) Jan Zieliński (quarterfinals)
10. (Germany) Kevin Krawietz / (Germany) Tim Pütz (first round)
11. (Belgium) Sander Gillé / (Belgium) Joran Vliegen (first round)
12. (United Kingdom) Jamie Murray / (New Zealand) Michael Venus (second round)
13. (United Kingdom) Lloyd Glasspool / (Finland) Harri Heliövaara (second round)
14. (Netherlands) Matwé Middelkoop / (Croatia) Mate Pavić (second round)
15. (United States) Nathaniel Lammons / (United States) Jackson Withrow (quarterfinals)
16. (Netherlands) Robin Haase / (Croatia) Nikola Mektić (second round)

Click on the seed number of a player to go to their draw section.

== Draw ==
Key

- Q = Qualifier
- WC = Wild card
- LL = Lucky loser
- Alt = Alternate
- ITF = ITF entry
- PR = Protected ranking
- SR = Special ranking
- SE = Special exempt
- JE = Junior exempt
- JR = Junior Accelerator Programme entrant
- CO = College Accelerator Programme entrant
- NG = Next Gen Accelerator Program entrant
- w/o = Walkover
- r = Retired
- d = Defaulted

=== Finals ===
Quarterfinals
15	(United States) Nathaniel Lammons (United States) Jackson Withrow	6^{10}	1
6	(India) Rohan Bopanna (Australia) Matthew Ebden	7^{12}	6
(United States) Robert Galloway (France) Albano Olivetti	5	4
PR	(France) Pierre-Hugues Herbert (France) Nicolas Mahut	7	6
5	(Argentina) Máximo González (Argentina) Andrés Molteni	4	3
3	(United States) Rajeev Ram (United Kingdom) Joe Salisbury	6	6
9	(Monaco) Hugo Nys (Poland) Jan Zieliński	4	6	3
2	(Croatia) Ivan Dodig (United States) Austin Krajicek	6	2	6

Semifinals
6	(India) Rohan Bopanna (Australia) Matthew Ebden	7^{7}	6
PR	(France) Pierre-Hugues Herbert (France) Nicolas Mahut	6^{3}	2
3	(United States) Rajeev Ram (United Kingdom) Joe Salisbury	7	3	6
2	(Croatia) Ivan Dodig (United States) Austin Krajicek	5	6	3

Final
6	(India) Rohan Bopanna (Australia) Matthew Ebden	6	3	4
3	(United States) Rajeev Ram (United Kingdom) Joe Salisbury	2	6	6

=== Top half ===
==== Section 1 ====
First round
1	(Netherlands) W Koolhof (United Kingdom) N Skupski	7	7^{7}
(United States) C Eubanks (United States) B Shelton	5	6^{5}
(Colombia) JS Cabal (Colombia) R Farah	6	2	6
WC	(United States) N Godsick (United States) E Quinn	4	6	3
(Uruguay) A Behar (Czech Republic) A Pavlásek	6	6^{5}	7^{10}
(Austria) P Oswald (Netherlands) B van de Zandschulp	3	7^{7}	6^{8}
(Argentina) G Durán (Argentina) TM Etcheverry	4	4
15	(United States) N Lammons (United States) J Withrow	6	6
10	(Germany) K Krawietz (Germany) T Pütz	3	6	6^{6}
(France) G Barrère (France) Q Halys	6	3	7^{10}
WC	(United States) W Blumberg (United States) S Johnson	5	1
(United Kingdom) J Cash (United Kingdom) H Patten	7	6
(Kazakhstan) A Golubev; R Safiullin	6	6
WC	(United States) A Kovacevic (United States) N Moreno de Alboran	4	3
(Australia) C O'Connell (Australia) A Vukic	4	2
6	(India) R Bopanna (Australia) M Ebden	6	6

Second round
1	(Netherlands) W Koolhof (United Kingdom) N Skupski	7^{7}	1	6
(Colombia) JS Cabal (Colombia) R Farah	6^{2}	6	3
(Uruguay) A Behar (Czech Republic) A Pavlásek	6^{3}	4
15	(United States) N Lammons (United States) J Withrow	7^{7}	6
(France) G Barrère (France) Q Halys	6^{3}	3
(United Kingdom) J Cash (United Kingdom) H Patten	7^{7}	6
(Kazakhstan) A Golubev; R Safiullin	3	3
6	(India) R Bopanna (Australia) M Ebden	6	6

Third round
1	(Netherlands) W Koolhof (United Kingdom) N Skupski	6^{2}	3
15	(United States) N Lammons (United States) J Withrow	7^{7}	6
(United Kingdom) J Cash (United Kingdom) H Patten	4	7^{7}	6^{6}
6	(India) R Bopanna (Australia) M Ebden	6	6^{5}	7^{10}

Quarterfinals
15	(United States) N Lammons (United States) J Withrow	6^{10}	1
6	(India) R Bopanna (Australia) M Ebden	7^{12}	6

==== Section 2 ====
First round
4	(El Salvador) M Arévalo (Netherlands) J-J Rojer	6	6
Alt	(Ukraine) D Molchanov (Netherlands) D Pel	1	2
(Argentina) S Báez (Venezuela) LD Martínez	4	6^{3}
(Italy) M Arnaldi (Netherlands) B Stevens	6	7^{7}
(United States) R Galloway (France) A Olivetti	6	3	7^{10}
WC	(United States) J Isner (United States) J Sock	2	6	6^{3}
(Brazil) M Melo (Australia) J Peers	4	6^{4}
13	(United Kingdom) L Glasspool (Finland) H Heliövaara	6	7^{7}
12	(United Kingdom) J Murray (New Zealand) M Venus	7^{7}	7^{7}
(Ecuador) G Escobar (Kazakhstan) A Nedovyesov	6^{3}	6^{3}
PR	(France) P-H Herbert (France) N Mahut	6	6
(Hungary) M Fucsovics (Australia) A Popyrin	3	2
(Australia) M Purcell (Australia) J Thompson	4	6	3
PR	(South Africa) L Harris (Serbia) M Kecmanović	6	3	6
(Colombia) DE Galán (China) Z Zhang	4	4
8	(Spain) M Granollers (Argentina) H Zeballos	6	6

Second round
4	(El Salvador) M Arévalo (Netherlands) J-J Rojer	6	6
(Italy) M Arnaldi (Netherlands) B Stevens	2	3
(United States) R Galloway (France) A Olivetti	7^{9}	7^{7}
13	(United Kingdom) L Glasspool (Finland) H Heliövaara	6^{7}	6^{4}
12	(United Kingdom) J Murray (New Zealand) M Venus	4	4
PR	(France) P-H Herbert (France) N Mahut	6	6
PR	(South Africa) L Harris (Serbia) M Kecmanović	5	4
8	(Spain) M Granollers (Argentina) H Zeballos	7	6

Third round
4	(El Salvador) M Arévalo (Netherlands) J-J Rojer	6	4	3
(United States) R Galloway (France) A Olivetti	3	6	6
PR	(France) P-H Herbert (France) N Mahut	7^{7}	4	6
8	(Spain) M Granollers (Argentina) H Zeballos	6^{0}	6	4

Quarterfinals
(United States) R Galloway (France) A Olivetti	5	4
PR	(France) P-H Herbert (France) N Mahut	7	6

=== Bottom half ===
==== Section 3 ====
First round
5	(Argentina) M González (Argentina) A Molteni	6	6
(Argentina) P Cachin (Peru) JP Varillas	4	2
(France) A Mannarino (France) A Rinderknech	6	7
WC	(United States) E Spizzirri (United States) T Zink	3	5
(Netherlands) T Griekspoor (Australia) T Kokkinakis	6	6
WC	(United States) A Frusina (United States) A Ganesan	4	4
(Portugal) F Cabral (Brazil) R Matos	3	7^{7}	6
11	(Belgium) S Gillé (Belgium) J Vliegen	6	6^{4}	4
16	(Netherlands) R Haase (Croatia) N Mektić	6	6^{5}	7^{10}
(Serbia) N Ćaćić (Romania) VV Cornea	3	7^{7}	6^{6}
(United States) M McDonald (Germany) A Mies	7^{7}	6
(France) A Fils (France) L Van Assche	6^{4}	1
(Japan) B McLachlan (Japan) Y Nishioka	6^{5}	6	6
(Austria) A Erler (Austria) L Miedler	7^{7}	4	4
(Italy) S Bolelli (Italy) A Vavassori	3	6^{2}
3	(United States) R Ram (United Kingdom) J Salisbury	6	7^{7}

Second round
5	(Argentina) M González (Argentina) A Molteni	6	6
(France) A Mannarino (France) A Rinderknech	2	1
(Netherlands) T Griekspoor (Australia) T Kokkinakis	4	6	6
(Portugal) F Cabral (Brazil) R Matos	6	4	4
16	(Netherlands) R Haase (Croatia) N Mektić	4	3
(United States) M McDonald (Germany) A Mies	6	6
(Japan) B McLachlan (Japan) Y Nishioka	3	6^{4}
3	(United States) R Ram (United Kingdom) J Salisbury	6	7^{7}

Third round
5	(Argentina) M González (Argentina) A Molteni	7^{7}	6^{2}	6
(Netherlands) T Griekspoor (Australia) T Kokkinakis	6^{4}	7^{7}	3
(United States) M McDonald (Germany) A Mies	3	6	2
3	(United States) R Ram (United Kingdom) J Salisbury	6	3	6

Quarterfinals
5	(Argentina) M González (Argentina) A Molteni	4	3
3	(United States) R Ram (United Kingdom) J Salisbury	6	6

==== Section 4 ====
First round
7	(Mexico) S González (France) É Roger-Vasselin	6	4	6
(United States) M Cressy (France) F Martin	4	6	0
(Colombia) N Barrientos (Sweden) A Göransson	7^{7}	6
(Monaco) R Arneodo (Austria) S Weissborn	6^{5}	4
Alt	A Karatsev (India) S Myneni	7^{7}	3	2
(Serbia) L Djere (Switzerland) M-A Hüsler	6^{4}	6	6
(India) Y Bhambri (Brazil) M Demoliner	3	5
9	(Monaco) H Nys (Poland) J Zieliński	6	7
14	(Netherlands) M Middelkoop (Croatia) M Pavić	6	6^{4}	6
(France) S Doumbia (France) F Reboul	2	7^{7}	3
(France) A Müller (Austria) S Ofner	5	1
WC	(United States) V Kirkov (United States) D Kudla	7	6
(Greece) Pe Tsitsipas (Greece) S Tsitsipas	7^{7}	6
(Mexico) MÁ Reyes-Varela (Spain) D Vega Hernández	6^{2}	4
(Spain) R Carballés Baena (Spain) B Zapata Miralles	7	3	4
2	(Croatia) I Dodig (United States) A Krajicek	5	6	6

Second round
7	(Mexico) S González (France) É Roger-Vasselin	5	7^{7}	7^{11}
(Colombia) N Barrientos (Sweden) A Göransson	7	6^{1}	6^{9}
(Serbia) L Djere (Switzerland) M-A Hüsler	3	6^{4}
9	(Monaco) H Nys (Poland) J Zieliński	6	7^{7}
14	(Netherlands) M Middelkoop (Croatia) M Pavić	3	6	4
WC	(United States) V Kirkov (United States) D Kudla	6	4	6
(Greece) Pe Tsitsipas (Greece) S Tsitsipas	5	7^{7}	4
2	(Croatia) I Dodig (United States) A Krajicek	7	6^{5}	6

Third round
7	(Mexico) S González (France) É Roger-Vasselin	7^{7}	4	2
9	(Monaco) H Nys (Poland) J Zieliński	6^{3}	6	6
WC	(United States) V Kirkov (United States) D Kudla	7	4	5
2	(Croatia) I Dodig (United States) A Krajicek	5	6	7

Quarterfinals
9	(Monaco) H Nys (Poland) J Zieliński	4	6	3
2	(Croatia) I Dodig (United States) A Krajicek	6	2	6

== Seeded teams ==
The following are the seeded teams. Seedings are based on ATP rankings as of August 21, 2023.

Country	Player	Country	Player	Rank	Seed
NED	Wesley Koolhof	GBR	Neal Skupski	2	1
CRO	Ivan Dodig	USA	Austin Krajicek	7	2
USA	Rajeev Ram	GBR	Joe Salisbury	11	3
ESA	Marcelo Arévalo	NED	Jean-Julien Rojer	16	4
ARG	Máximo González	ARG	Andrés Molteni	19	5
IND	Rohan Bopanna	AUS	Matthew Ebden	24	6
MEX	Santiago González	FRA	Édouard Roger-Vasselin	26	7
ESP	Marcel Granollers	ARG	Horacio Zeballos	34	8
MON	Hugo Nys	POL	Jan Zieliński	36	9
GER	Kevin Krawietz	GER	Tim Pütz	38	10
BEL	Sander Gillé	BEL	Joran Vliegen	42	11
GBR	Jamie Murray	NZL	Michael Venus	51	12
GBR	Lloyd Glasspool	FIN	Harri Heliövaara	54	13
NED	Matwé Middelkoop	CRO	Mate Pavić	58	14
USA	Nathaniel Lammons	USA	Jackson Withrow	61	15
NED	Robin Haase	CRO	Nikola Mektić	65	16

== Other entry information ==
=== Wild card entries ===
- (United States) William Blumberg / (United States) Steve Johnson
- (United States) Alexander Frusina / (United States) Adhithya Ganesan
- (United States) Nicholas Godsick / (United States) Ethan Quinn
- (United States) John Isner / (United States) Jack Sock
- (United States) Vasil Kirkov / (United States) Denis Kudla
- (United States) Aleksandar Kovacevic / (United States) Nicolas Moreno de Alboran
- (United States) Eliot Spizzirri / (United States) Tyler Zink

=== Protected ranking ===
- (South Africa) Lloyd Harris / (Serbia) Miomir Kecmanović
- (France) Pierre-Hugues Herbert / (France) Nicolas Mahut

=== Alternates ===
- Aslan Karatsev / (India) Saketh Myneni
- (Ukraine) Denys Molchanov / (Netherlands) David Pel

=== Withdrawals ===
- (Argentina) Guido Andreozzi / (Argentina) Francisco Cerúndolo → replaced by (Ukraine) Denys Molchanov / (Netherlands) David Pel
- (Kazakhstan) Alexander Bublik / Alexander Shevchenko → replaced by Aslan Karatsev / (India) Saketh Myneni
