= Iliyan Radulov =

Bulgarian tennis player (born 2005)

- Native name: Илиян Радулов
- Country (sports): Bulgaria
- Born: 11 June 2005 (age 21) Plovdiv, Bulgaria
- Plays: Right-handed (two-handed backhand)
- Coach: Hristo Boyanov, Eduard Esteve
- Prize money: US $59,015

Singles
- Career record: 1–3 (at ATP Tour level, Grand Slam level, and in Davis Cup)
- Career titles: 0
- Highest ranking: No. 432 (30 June 2025)
- Current ranking: No. 570 (19 October 2026)

Doubles
- Career record: 0–0 (at ATP Tour level, Grand Slam level, and in Davis Cup)
- Career titles: 0
- Highest ranking: No. 965 (19 October 2026)
- Current ranking: No. 965 (19 October 2026)
- Last updated on: 19 October 2026.

Iliyan Radulov (Bulgarian: Илиян Радулов, born 11 June 2005) is a Bulgarian tennis player. He has a career-high ATP singles ranking of No. 432 achieved on 27 July 2026 and a doubles ranking of No. 965 achieved on 19 October 2026. Radulov reached an ITF junior combined ranking of No. 4 achieved on 17 April 2023.

Radulov represents Bulgaria at the Davis Cup, where he has a win/loss record of 2–3.

== Junior career ==
In January 2023, Radulov made it to the quarterfinals at the 2023 Australian Open. In July, he made another quarterfinal at the 2023 Wimbledon Championships, beating Nicolai Budkov Kjær along the way.

In October 2023, Radulov made it to the semifinals of the World Tennis Tour Junior Finals, where he lost to Joel Schwärzler.

== Professional career ==
In 2023, Radulov won his first ITF title at Pazardzhik, Bulgaria.

In July 2026, Radulov won his first doubles title at Roda de Berà, Spain with Albert Pedrico Kravtsov.

At the 2026 Davis Cup, Radulov lost to Holger Rune and Elmer Møller, resulting in Bulgaria losing to Denmark in the tie 3-2.

== ITF World Tennis Tour finals ==
=== Singles: 7 (4 titles, 3 runner-ups) ===
Finals by surface
Hard (1–0)
Clay (3–3)
Grass (0–0)

Result	W–L	Date	Tournament	Tier	Surface	Opponent	Score
Win	1–0	May 2023	M15 Pazardzhik, Bulgaria	WTT	Clay	(Italy) Simone Roncalli	6–4, 6–1
Win	2–0	Nov 2024	M15 Madrid, Spain	WTT	Hard	(United States) Darwin Blanch	6–4, 7–5
Loss	2–1	Dec 2024	M15 Madrid, Spain	WTT	Clay	(Netherlands) Michiel de Krom	6–7^{(4–7)}, 3–6
Win	3–1	May 2025	M15 La Nucia, Spain	WTT	Clay	(Spain) Alejo Sánchez Quílez	6–1, 2–6, 7–6^{(7–5)}
Loss	3–2	Jan 2026	M15 Antalya, Turkey	WTT	Clay	(Serbia) Stefan Popović	6–7^{(1–7)}, 6–2
Loss	3–3	Feb 2026	M15 Antalya, Turkey	WTT	Clay	(Romania) Cezar Crețu	2–6, 3–6
Win	4–3	May 2026	M25 Sabadell, Spain	WTT	Clay	(Spain) Oriol Roca Batalla	7–6^{(7–4)}, 6–2

=== Doubles: 3 (1 title, 2 runner-ups) ===
Finals by surface
Hard (1–1)
Clay (0–3)
Grass (0–0)

Result	W–L	Date	Tournament	Tier	Surface	Partner	Opponents	Score
Loss	0–1	Oct 2024	M15 Pontevedra, Spain	WTT	Hard	Yaroslav Demin	(Spain) Rafael Izquierdo Luque (Spain) Iván Marrero Curbelo	3–6, 6–3, [6–10]
Loss	0–2	Mar 2026	M25 Badalona, Spain	WTT	Clay	Yaroslav Demin	(Netherlands) Michiel de Krom (Netherlands) Ryan Nijboer	6–7^{(6–8)}, 4–6
Win	1–2	Jul 2026	M25 Roda de Berà, Spain	WTT	Hard	(Spain) Albert Pedrico Kravtsov	(Spain) Manel Lazaro Juncadella (Spain) Iker Urribarrens Ramírez	6–3, 4–6, [10–6]
