= Adhithya Ganesan =

American tennis player (born 2005)

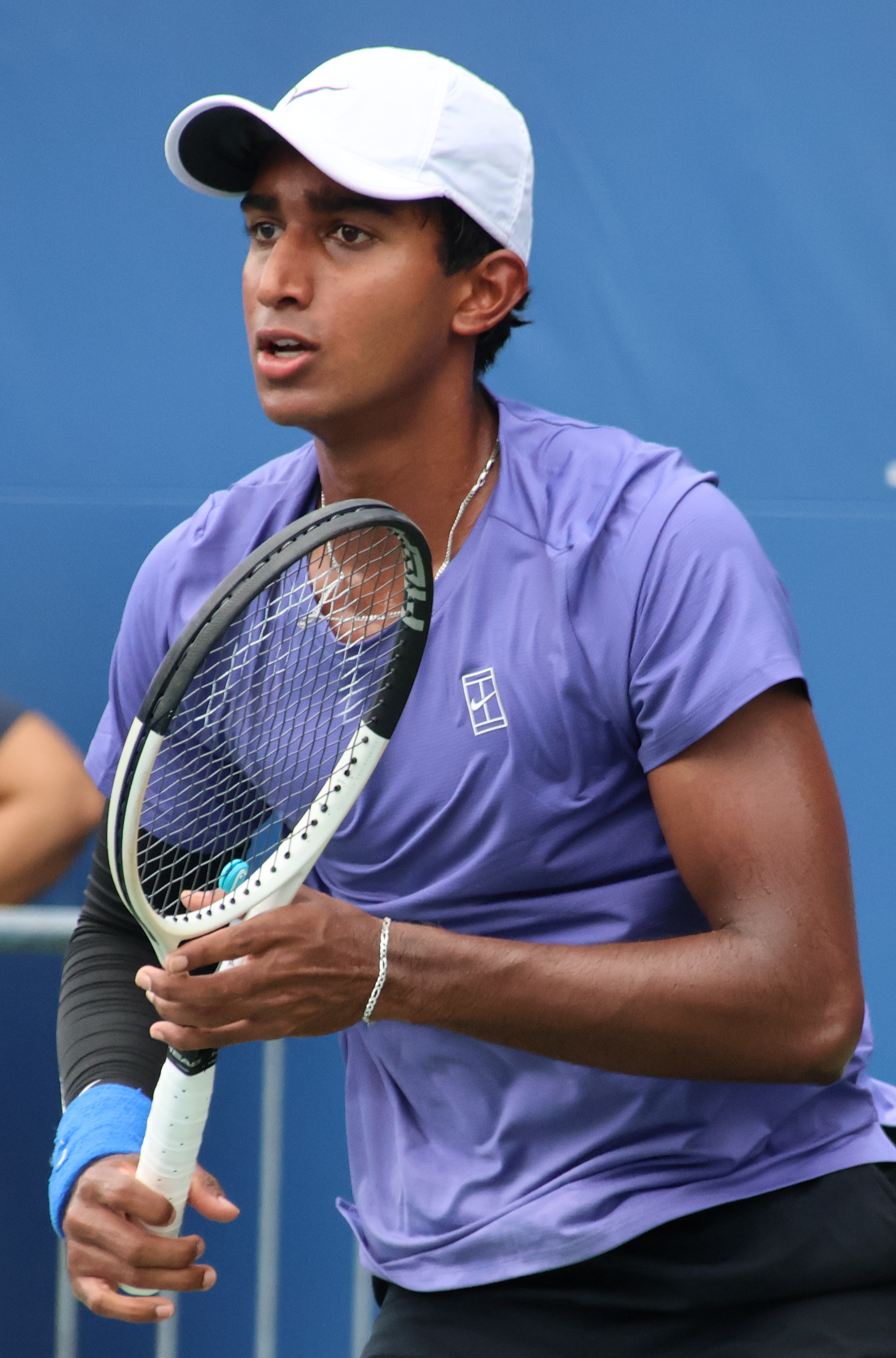
- Ganesan at the 2025 Washington Open
- Country (sports): United States
- Born: October 24, 2005 (age 21) West Lafayette, Indiana, US
- Height: 6 ft 4 in (1.93 m)
- Plays: Right-handed (two-handed backhand)
- College: University of Florida
- Prize money: US $56,337

Singles
- Career record: 0–0 (at ATP Tour level, Grand Slam level, and in Davis Cup)
- Career titles: 0
- Highest ranking: No. 544 (September 22, 2025)
- Current ranking: No. 827 (November 9, 2026)

Doubles
- Career record: 0–1 (at ATP Tour level, Grand Slam level, and in Davis Cup)
- Career titles: 0
- Highest ranking: No. 837 (February 10, 2025)
- Current ranking: No. 1,122 (November 9, 2026)

Grand Slam doubles results
- US Open: 1R (2023)
- Last updated on: November 9, 2026.

Adhithya Ganesan (born October 24, 2005) is an American professional tennis player. He has a career-high ATP singles ranking of No. 544 achieved on September 22, 2025 and a best doubles ranking of No. 837, reached on February 10, 2025.

Ganesan plays mostly on ITF Men's Tour.

== Junior career ==
Ganesan was as a blue-chip recruit of Tennis Recruiting Program by the USTA, that recognized him as one of the top American junior talents.

The American had mixed results on ITF junior circuit, maintaining a 95–50 singles win-loss record. He reached an ITF junior combined ranking of No. 24 on November 27, 2023.

== Professional career ==
Ganesan made his Slam major debut at the 2023 US Open. He received a wildcard into the men's doubles main draw with Alexander Frusina, after they won the USTA boys' doubles national championship.

== Personal life ==
Ganesan currently competes for the University of Florida's collegiate tennis team.

== ITF World Tennis Tour finals ==
=== Singles: 2 (2 runner-ups) ===
Legend ITF WTT (0–2)

Result	W–L	Date	Tournament	Tier	Surface	Opponent	Score
Loss	0–1	May 2025	M25 Orlando, US	WTT	Clay	(Argentina) Renzo Olivo	6–3, 4–6, 3–6
Loss	0–2	Jun 2025	M25 Hillcrest, South Africa	WTT	Hard	(South Africa) Philip Henning	2–6, 7–5, 1–6
