= 2026 ATP Challenger Tour =

Secondary tennis circuit season

Details
- Duration: 5 January – 20 December
- Edition: 49th (18th under this name)
- Tournaments: 263
- Categories: Challenger 175 (6); Challenger 125 (39); Challenger 100 (33); Challenger 75 (104); Challenger 50 (81)

Achievements (singles)
- Most titles: (Argentina) Facundo Díaz Acosta (6)
- Most finals: (Brazil) Thiago Seyboth Wild (8)

The Association of Tennis Professionals (ATP) Challenger Tour in 2026 is the secondary professional tennis circuit organized by the ATP. The 2026 ATP Challenger Tour calendar comprises 263 tournaments, with prize money ranging from $63,000 up to $300,000. It is the 49th edition of Challenger tournaments cycle, and 18th under the name of Challenger Tour.

== Schedule ==
This is the complete schedule of events on the 2026 calendar, with player progression documented from the quarterfinals stage.

=== January ===
Week of	Tournament	Champions	Runners-up	Semifinalists	Quarterfinalists
January 5	Bengaluru Open; Bengaluru, India; Hard – Challenger 125 – 32S/24Q/16D; Singles – Doubles	(Spain) Pedro Martínez; 7–6^{(7–5)}, 6–3	(Kazakhstan) Timofey Skatov	(France) Matteo Martineau (France) Harold Mayot	(Germany) Cedrik-Marcel Stebe (India) Manas Dhamne (Czech Republic) Jonáš Forejtek (India) Dhakshineswar Suresh
January 5	Bengaluru Open; Bengaluru, India; Hard – Challenger 125 – 32S/24Q/16D; Singles – Doubles	(Colombia) Nicolás Barrientos (United States) Benjamin Kittay; 7–6^{(11–9)}, 7–5	(France) Arthur Reymond (France) Luca Sanchez	(France) Matteo Martineau (France) Harold Mayot	(Germany) Cedrik-Marcel Stebe (India) Manas Dhamne (Czech Republic) Jonáš Forejtek (India) Dhakshineswar Suresh
January 5	Canberra Tennis International; Canberra, Australia; Hard – Challenger 125 – 32S/24Q/16D; Singles – Doubles	(Belgium) Alexander Blockx; 6–4, 6–4	(Spain) Rafael Jódar	(Australia) James McCabe (France) Kyrian Jacquet	(Czech Republic) Vít Kopřiva (Chile) Tomás Barrios Vera (Serbia) Dušan Lajović (Japan) Sho Shimabukuro
January 5	Canberra Tennis International; Canberra, Australia; Hard – Challenger 125 – 32S/24Q/16D; Singles – Doubles	(United States) Mac Kiger (United States) Reese Stalder; 7–6^{(7–3)}, 6–3	(Australia) Blake Bayldon (Australia) Patrick Harper	(Australia) James McCabe (France) Kyrian Jacquet	(Czech Republic) Vít Kopřiva (Chile) Tomás Barrios Vera (Serbia) Dušan Lajović (Japan) Sho Shimabukuro
January 5	BNC Tennis Open; Nouméa, New Caledonia; Hard – Challenger 75 – 32S/24Q/16D; Singles – Doubles	(France) Arthur Géa; 6–3, 4–6, 7–5	(Austria) Jurij Rodionov	(Australia) Blake Ellis (United States) Michael Zheng	(Australia) Jordan Thompson (Australia) Bernard Tomic (France) Clément Tabur (Canada) Liam Draxl
January 5	BNC Tennis Open; Nouméa, New Caledonia; Hard – Challenger 75 – 32S/24Q/16D; Singles – Doubles	(Japan) Yusuke Kusuhara (Japan) Shunsuke Nakagawa; 7–5, 6–3	(Australia) Jake Delaney (Australia) Calum Puttergill	(Australia) Blake Ellis (United States) Michael Zheng	(Australia) Jordan Thompson (Australia) Bernard Tomic (France) Clément Tabur (Canada) Liam Draxl
January 5	Nonthaburi Challenger; Nonthaburi, Thailand; Hard – Challenger 50 – 32S/24Q/16D; Singles – Doubles	(Japan) Rio Noguchi; 6–3, 6–4	(Czech Republic) Marek Gengel	(Czech Republic) Zdeněk Kolář (Austria) Joel Schwärzler	(Belgium) Tibo Colson (Uzbekistan) Sergey Fomin; Marat Sharipov (Italy) Lorenzo Giustino
January 5	Nonthaburi Challenger; Nonthaburi, Thailand; Hard – Challenger 50 – 32S/24Q/16D; Singles – Doubles	(Israel) Daniel Cukierman (Austria) Joel Schwärzler; 6–3, 6–1	(Chinese Taipei) Hsieh Cheng-peng (Chinese Taipei) Huang Tsung-hao	(Czech Republic) Zdeněk Kolář (Austria) Joel Schwärzler	(Belgium) Tibo Colson (Uzbekistan) Sergey Fomin; Marat Sharipov (Italy) Lorenzo Giustino
January 5	Lexus Nottingham Challenger; Nottingham, United Kingdom; Hard (i) – Challenger 50 – 32S/24Q/16D; Singles – Doubles	(France) Clément Chidekh; 5–7, 6–2, 7–6^{(7–5)}	(United Kingdom) Johannus Monday	(Kazakhstan) Mikhail Kukushkin (United Kingdom) Toby Samuel	(Germany) Tom Gentzsch (United States) Cannon Kingsley (United States) Stefan Kozlov (United Kingdom) Charles Broom
January 5	Lexus Nottingham Challenger; Nottingham, United Kingdom; Hard (i) – Challenger 50 – 32S/24Q/16D; Singles – Doubles	(United Kingdom) Charles Broom (United Kingdom) David Stevenson; 6–2, 7–6^{(7–5)}	(Slovakia) Miloš Karol (Germany) Daniel Masur	(Kazakhstan) Mikhail Kukushkin (United Kingdom) Toby Samuel	(Germany) Tom Gentzsch (United States) Cannon Kingsley (United States) Stefan Kozlov (United Kingdom) Charles Broom
January 12	Nonthaburi Challenger II; Nonthaburi, Thailand; Hard – Challenger 75 – 32S/24Q/16D; Singles – Doubles	(Spain) Pol Martín Tiffon; 6–4, 3–6, 6–4	(Thailand) Maximus Jones	(Japan) Rio Noguchi (Kazakhstan) Timofey Skatov	(Czech Republic) Marek Gengel (China) Zhou Yi; Marat Sharipov (France) Florent Bax
January 12	Nonthaburi Challenger II; Nonthaburi, Thailand; Hard – Challenger 75 – 32S/24Q/16D; Singles – Doubles	(India) Sriram Balaji (Austria) Neil Oberleitner; 6–3, 7–6^{(8–6)}	(India) Anirudh Chandrasekar (Japan) Takeru Yuzuki	(Japan) Rio Noguchi (Kazakhstan) Timofey Skatov	(Czech Republic) Marek Gengel (China) Zhou Yi; Marat Sharipov (France) Florent Bax
January 12	Challenger AAT; Buenos Aires, Argentina; Clay – Challenger 50 – 32S/24Q/16D; Singles – Doubles	(Italy) Franco Agamenone; 3–6, 6–4, 6–2	(Argentina) Andrea Collarini	(Bolivia) Murkel Dellien (Peru) Juan Pablo Varillas	(Argentina) Juan Manuel La Serna (Spain) Nikolás Sánchez Izquierdo (Brazil) Pedro Boscardin Dias (Argentina) Lautaro Midón
January 12	Challenger AAT; Buenos Aires, Argentina; Clay – Challenger 50 – 32S/24Q/16D; Singles – Doubles	(Argentina) Mariano Kestelboim (Brazil) Marcelo Zormann; 6–3, 6–4	(Romania) Alexandru Jecan (Romania) Bogdan Pavel	(Bolivia) Murkel Dellien (Peru) Juan Pablo Varillas	(Argentina) Juan Manuel La Serna (Spain) Nikolás Sánchez Izquierdo (Brazil) Pedro Boscardin Dias (Argentina) Lautaro Midón
January 12	Glasgow Challenger; Glasgow, United Kingdom; Hard (i) – Challenger 50 – 32S/24Q/16D; Singles – Doubles	(France) Clément Chidekh; 5–7, 6–1, 4–0 ret.	(Kazakhstan) Mikhail Kukushkin	(Czech Republic) Hynek Bartoň (Slovakia) Norbert Gombos	(United Kingdom) Johannus Monday (Germany) Tom Gentzsch (United Kingdom) Liam Broady (United Kingdom) Charles Broom
January 12	Glasgow Challenger; Glasgow, United Kingdom; Hard (i) – Challenger 50 – 32S/24Q/16D; Singles – Doubles	(Germany) Christoph Negritu (Colombia) Adrià Soriano Barrera; 2–6, 6–2, [10–4]	(United Kingdom) Charles Broom (United Kingdom) Ben Jones	(Czech Republic) Hynek Bartoň (Slovakia) Norbert Gombos	(United Kingdom) Johannus Monday (Germany) Tom Gentzsch (United Kingdom) Liam Broady (United Kingdom) Charles Broom
January 19	Oeiras Indoors; Oeiras, Portugal; Hard (i) – Challenger 100 – 32S/24Q/16D; Singles – Doubles	(Luxembourg) Chris Rodesch; 6–4, 4–6, 6–2	(Hungary) Zsombor Piros	(Lithuania) Vilius Gaubas (Estonia) Daniil Glinka	(Germany) Mats Rosenkranz (Kazakhstan) Mikhail Kukushkin (Italy) Francesco Passaro (Switzerland) Leandro Riedi
January 19	Oeiras Indoors; Oeiras, Portugal; Hard (i) – Challenger 100 – 32S/24Q/16D; Singles – Doubles	(Canada) Cleeve Harper (United Kingdom) David Stevenson; 6–3, 3–6, [12–10]	(Portugal) Francisco Rocha (Portugal) Tiago Torres	(Lithuania) Vilius Gaubas (Estonia) Daniil Glinka	(Germany) Mats Rosenkranz (Kazakhstan) Mikhail Kukushkin (Italy) Francesco Passaro (Switzerland) Leandro Riedi
January 19	Itajaí Open; Itajaí, Brazil; Clay – Challenger 75 – 32S/24Q/16D; Singles – Doubles	(Paraguay) Daniel Vallejo; 7–5, 4–6, 6–2	(Brazil) Thiago Seyboth Wild	(Argentina) Alex Barrena (Spain) Nikolás Sánchez Izquierdo	(Brazil) Igor Marcondes (Peru) Gonzalo Bueno (Romania) Ștefan Paloși (Brazil) Thiago Monteiro
January 19	Itajaí Open; Itajaí, Brazil; Clay – Challenger 75 – 32S/24Q/16D; Singles – Doubles	(Brazil) Igor Marcondes (Brazil) Eduardo Ribeiro; 6–4, 6–4	(Brazil) Bruno Oliveira (Brazil) Matheus Pucinelli de Almeida	(Argentina) Alex Barrena (Spain) Nikolás Sánchez Izquierdo	(Brazil) Igor Marcondes (Peru) Gonzalo Bueno (Romania) Ștefan Paloși (Brazil) Thiago Monteiro
January 19	Soma Bay Open; Soma Bay, Egypt; Hard – Challenger 75 – 32S/24Q/16D; Singles – Doubles	(South Africa) Lloyd Harris; 6–1, 5–2 ret.	(United Kingdom) Jack Pinnington Jones	(Lithuania) Edas Butvilas (Croatia) Borna Gojo	(Mexico) Rodrigo Pacheco Méndez (Czech Republic) Maxim Mrva (Germany) Patrick Zahraj (Austria) Lukas Neumayer
January 19	Soma Bay Open; Soma Bay, Egypt; Hard – Challenger 75 – 32S/24Q/16D; Singles – Doubles	(Sweden) Erik Grevelius (Sweden) Adam Heinonen; 6–2, 6–3	(Mexico) Alex Hernández (Mexico) Rodrigo Pacheco Méndez	(Lithuania) Edas Butvilas (Croatia) Borna Gojo	(Mexico) Rodrigo Pacheco Méndez (Czech Republic) Maxim Mrva (Germany) Patrick Zahraj (Austria) Lukas Neumayer
January 19	Phan Thiết Challenger; Phan Thiết, Vietnam; Hard – Challenger 50 – 32S/24Q/16D; Singles – Doubles	(South Korea) Kwon Soon-woo; 6–2, 7–6^{(7–5)}	Ilia Simakin	(Poland) Daniel Michalski (France) Lilian Marmousez	(France) Robin Bertrand (United States) Darwin Blanch; Petr Bar Biryukov (Germany) Max Hans Rehberg
January 19	Phan Thiết Challenger; Phan Thiết, Vietnam; Hard – Challenger 50 – 32S/24Q/16D; Singles – Doubles	(Japan) James Trotter (Japan) Kaito Uesugi; 6–3, 5–7, [10–4]	(United States) George Goldhoff (United States) Reese Stalder	(Poland) Daniel Michalski (France) Lilian Marmousez	(France) Robin Bertrand (United States) Darwin Blanch; Petr Bar Biryukov (Germany) Max Hans Rehberg
January 26	Bahrain Ministry of Interior Tennis Challenger; Manama, Bahrain; Hard – Challenger 125 – 32S/24Q/16D; Singles – Doubles	(France) Kyrian Jacquet; 7–5, 3–6, 6–4	(Italy) Luca Nardi	(Finland) Otto Virtanen (Italy) Mattia Bellucci	(France) Ugo Blanchet (Italy) Stefano Travaglia (United Kingdom) Jacob Fearnley (Argentina) Thiago Agustín Tirante
January 26	Bahrain Ministry of Interior Tennis Challenger; Manama, Bahrain; Hard – Challenger 125 – 32S/24Q/16D; Singles – Doubles	(India) Sriram Balaji (Austria) Neil Oberleitner; 7–6^{(7–1)}, 6–4	(United States) Vasil Kirkov (Netherlands) Bart Stevens	(Finland) Otto Virtanen (Italy) Mattia Bellucci	(France) Ugo Blanchet (Italy) Stefano Travaglia (United Kingdom) Jacob Fearnley (Argentina) Thiago Agustín Tirante
January 26	Open Quimper Bretagne; Quimper, France; Hard (i) – Challenger 125 – 32S/24Q/16D; Singles – Doubles	(France) Luca Van Assche; 3–6, 6–1, 7–5	(Switzerland) Rémy Bertola	(France) Sascha Gueymard Wayenburg (Switzerland) Marc-Andrea Hüsler	(France) Titouan Droguet (France) Benjamin Bonzi (France) Thomas Faurel (United States) Mackenzie McDonald
January 26	Open Quimper Bretagne; Quimper, France; Hard (i) – Challenger 125 – 32S/24Q/16D; Singles – Doubles	(France) Arthur Reymond (France) Luca Sanchez; 7–6^{(9–7)}, 3–6, [10–3]	(France) Dan Added (France) Arthur Bouquier	(France) Sascha Gueymard Wayenburg (Switzerland) Marc-Andrea Hüsler	(France) Titouan Droguet (France) Benjamin Bonzi (France) Thomas Faurel (United States) Mackenzie McDonald
January 26	Challenger Concepción; Concepción, Chile; Clay – Challenger 100 – 32S/24Q/16D; Singles – Doubles	(Paraguay) Daniel Vallejo; 6–2, 1–6, 6–1	(Chile) Alejandro Tabilo	(Italy) Marco Cecchinato (Chile) Tomás Barrios Vera	(Argentina) Lautaro Midón (Chinese Taipei) Tseng Chun-hsin (Brazil) João Lucas Reis da Silva (Argentina) Guido Iván Justo
January 26	Challenger Concepción; Concepción, Chile; Clay – Challenger 100 – 32S/24Q/16D; Singles – Doubles	(Ecuador) Gonzalo Escobar (Brazil) Eduardo Ribeiro; 7–6^{(7–4)}, 6–4	(Argentina) Mariano Kestelboim (Brazil) Marcelo Zormann	(Italy) Marco Cecchinato (Chile) Tomás Barrios Vera	(Argentina) Lautaro Midón (Chinese Taipei) Tseng Chun-hsin (Brazil) João Lucas Reis da Silva (Argentina) Guido Iván Justo
January 26	San Diego Open; San Diego, United States; Hard – Challenger 100 – 32S/24Q/16D; Singles – Doubles	(United States) Zachary Svajda; 6–4, 7–6^{(7–5)}	(United States) Sebastian Korda	(United States) Patrick Kypson (Japan) Sho Shimabukuro	(Canada) Liam Draxl (United States) Colton Smith (United States) Mitchell Krueger (Australia) Rinky Hijikata
January 26	San Diego Open; San Diego, United States; Hard – Challenger 100 – 32S/24Q/16D; Singles – Doubles	(United States) Trey Hilderbrand (United States) Mac Kiger; 6–3, 6–4	(United States) Garrett Johns (United States) Karl Poling	(United States) Patrick Kypson (Japan) Sho Shimabukuro	(Canada) Liam Draxl (United States) Colton Smith (United States) Mitchell Krueger (Australia) Rinky Hijikata
January 26	Oeiras Indoors II; Oeiras, Portugal; Hard (i) – Challenger 75 – 32S/24Q/16D; Singles – Doubles	(Luxembourg) Chris Rodesch; 6–3, 7–5	(Estonia) Daniil Glinka	(Canada) Alexis Galarneau (Portugal) Frederico Ferreira Silva	(Spain) Iñaki Montes de la Torre (Portugal) Jaime Faria (Spain) Pablo Llamas Ruiz; Ivan Gakhov
January 26	Oeiras Indoors II; Oeiras, Portugal; Hard (i) – Challenger 75 – 32S/24Q/16D; Singles – Doubles	(Czech Republic) Filip Duda (Czech Republic) Zdeněk Kolář; 6–3, 6–4	(Sweden) Erik Grevelius (Sweden) Adam Heinonen	(Canada) Alexis Galarneau (Portugal) Frederico Ferreira Silva	(Spain) Iñaki Montes de la Torre (Portugal) Jaime Faria (Spain) Pablo Llamas Ruiz; Ivan Gakhov
January 26	Phan Thiết Challenger II; Phan Thiết, Vietnam; Hard – Challenger 50 – 32S/24Q/16D; Singles – Doubles	Ilia Simakin; 7–5, 6–4	(China) Zhou Yi	(Greece) Stefanos Sakellaridis (Poland) Daniel Michalski	(Germany) Nikolai Barsukov (Spain) Pol Martín Tiffon (Chinese Taipei) Hsu Yu-hsiou (France) Florent Bax
January 26	Phan Thiết Challenger II; Phan Thiết, Vietnam; Hard – Challenger 50 – 32S/24Q/16D; Singles – Doubles	(South Korea) Nam Ji-sung (South Korea) Park Ui-sung; 6–4, 6–3	(Australia) Joshua Charlton (Spain) Iván Marrero Curbelo	(Greece) Stefanos Sakellaridis (Poland) Daniel Michalski	(Germany) Nikolai Barsukov (Spain) Pol Martín Tiffon (Chinese Taipei) Hsu Yu-hsiou (France) Florent Bax

=== February ===
Week of	Tournament	Champions	Runners-up	Semifinalists	Quarterfinalists
February 2	Rosario Challenger; Rosario, Argentina; Clay – Challenger 125 – 32S/24Q/16D; Singles – Doubles	(Argentina) Camilo Ugo Carabelli; 6–2, 6–3	(Argentina) Román Andrés Burruchaga	(Argentina) Juan Manuel Cerúndolo (Chinese Taipei) Tseng Chun-hsin	(Bolivia) Hugo Dellien (Italy) Andrea Pellegrino (Argentina) Valerio Aboian (Brazil) Pedro Boscardin Dias
February 2	Rosario Challenger; Rosario, Argentina; Clay – Challenger 125 – 32S/24Q/16D; Singles – Doubles	(Uruguay) Ignacio Carou (Argentina) Facundo Mena; 6–1, 6–4	(Mexico) Miguel Ángel Reyes-Varela (Brazil) Fernando Romboli	(Argentina) Juan Manuel Cerúndolo (Chinese Taipei) Tseng Chun-hsin	(Bolivia) Hugo Dellien (Italy) Andrea Pellegrino (Argentina) Valerio Aboian (Brazil) Pedro Boscardin Dias
February 2	Queensland International; Brisbane, Australia; Hard – Challenger 75 – 32S/24Q/16D; Singles – Doubles	(Australia) Dane Sweeny; 3–6, 7–6^{(7–5)}, 7–6^{(7–4)}	(Australia) Tristan Schoolkate	(Japan) Yasutaka Uchiyama (Australia) Blake Ellis	(Australia) Cruz Hewitt (Australia) Alex Bolt (Australia) James McCabe (Japan) Rei Sakamoto
February 2	Queensland International; Brisbane, Australia; Hard – Challenger 75 – 32S/24Q/16D; Singles – Doubles	(Australia) Blake Bayldon (Australia) Marc Polmans; 6–4, 6–4	(Australia) Jake Delaney (Australia) Dane Sweeny	(Japan) Yasutaka Uchiyama (Australia) Blake Ellis	(Australia) Cruz Hewitt (Australia) Alex Bolt (Australia) James McCabe (Japan) Rei Sakamoto
February 2	Cleveland Open; Cleveland, United States; Hard (i) – Challenger 75 – 32S/24Q/16D; Singles – Doubles	(United States) Colton Smith; 6–4, 7–5	(Croatia) Borna Gojo	(United States) Joshua Sheehy (United States) Keegan Smith	(United States) Daniel Milavsky (United States) Quinn Vandecasteele (United States) Stefan Kozlov (United States) Stefan Dostanic
February 2	Cleveland Open; Cleveland, United States; Hard (i) – Challenger 75 – 32S/24Q/16D; Singles – Doubles	(United States) Cannon Kingsley (Antigua and Barbuda) Jody Maginley; 6–3, 6–4	(United States) George Goldhoff (Australia) Calum Puttergill	(United States) Joshua Sheehy (United States) Keegan Smith	(United States) Daniel Milavsky (United States) Quinn Vandecasteele (United States) Stefan Kozlov (United States) Stefan Dostanic
February 2	Tenerife Challenger; Tenerife, Spain; Hard – Challenger 75 – 32S/24Q/16D; Singles – Doubles	(Spain) Daniel Mérida; 6–2, 6–4	(Italy) Francesco Maestrelli	(Spain) Pol Martín Tiffon (Italy) Stefano Travaglia	(United Kingdom) George Loffhagen (Italy) Lorenzo Giustino (Spain) Javier Barranco Cosano (Spain) Alejandro Moro Cañas
February 2	Tenerife Challenger; Tenerife, Spain; Hard – Challenger 75 – 32S/24Q/16D; Singles – Doubles	(Jordan) Abdullah Shelbayh (Spain) David Vega Hernández; 6–2, 6–4	(Spain) Pablo Llamas Ruiz (Spain) Benjamín Winter López	(Spain) Pol Martín Tiffon (Italy) Stefano Travaglia	(United Kingdom) George Loffhagen (Italy) Lorenzo Giustino (Spain) Javier Barranco Cosano (Spain) Alejandro Moro Cañas
February 2	Trofeo Città di Cesenatico; Cesenatico, Italy; Hard (i) – Challenger 50 – 32S/24Q/16D; Singles – Doubles	(Ukraine) Oleg Prihodko; 6–7^{(8–10)}, 6–4, 6–4	(Italy) Raúl Brancaccio	Ivan Gakhov (Italy) Filippo Romano	(Italy) Federico Iannaccone (Czech Republic) Petr Brunclík (Italy) Pietro Fellin (Italy) Enrico Dalla Valle
February 2	Trofeo Città di Cesenatico; Cesenatico, Italy; Hard (i) – Challenger 50 – 32S/24Q/16D; Singles – Doubles	(Netherlands) Jarno Jans (Netherlands) Niels Visker; 7–6^{(9–7)}, 6–3	(Italy) Francesco Forti (Italy) Filippo Romano	Ivan Gakhov (Italy) Filippo Romano	(Italy) Federico Iannaccone (Czech Republic) Petr Brunclík (Italy) Pietro Fellin (Italy) Enrico Dalla Valle
February 2	Koblenz Open; Koblenz, Germany; Hard (i) – Challenger 50 – 32S/24Q/16D; Singles – Doubles	Pavel Kotov; 6–4, 1–6, 7–6^{(10–8)}	(Germany) Tom Gentzsch	(Germany) Max Schönhaus (Germany) Christoph Negritu	(Germany) Max Hans Rehberg (Japan) Kaichi Uchida (Germany) Florian Broska (France) Dan Added
February 2	Koblenz Open; Koblenz, Germany; Hard (i) – Challenger 50 – 32S/24Q/16D; Singles – Doubles	(Belgium) Tibo Colson (Netherlands) Thijmen Loof; 7–6^{(7–1)}, 3–6, [10–6]	(Czech Republic) Filip Duda (Serbia) Stefan Latinović	(Germany) Max Schönhaus (Germany) Christoph Negritu	(Germany) Max Hans Rehberg (Japan) Kaichi Uchida (Germany) Florian Broska (France) Dan Added
February 9	Teréga Open Pau–Pyrénées; Pau, France; Hard (i) – Challenger 125 – 32S/24Q/16D; Singles – Doubles	(Belgium) Raphaël Collignon; 7–6^{(7–5)}, 6–1	(France) Benjamin Bonzi	(France) Clément Tabur (Germany) Henri Squire	(France) Luca Van Assche (Tunisia) Moez Echargui (France) Arthur Bouquier (Kazakhstan) Alexander Shevchenko
February 9	Teréga Open Pau–Pyrénées; Pau, France; Hard (i) – Challenger 125 – 32S/24Q/16D; Singles – Doubles	(India) Sriram Balaji (Austria) Neil Oberleitner; 1–6, 6–3, [13–11]	(Switzerland) Jakub Paul (Czech Republic) Matěj Vocel	(France) Clément Tabur (Germany) Henri Squire	(France) Luca Van Assche (Tunisia) Moez Echargui (France) Arthur Bouquier (Kazakhstan) Alexander Shevchenko
February 9	Queensland International II; Brisbane, Australia; Hard – Challenger 75 – 32S/24Q/16D; Singles – Doubles	(China) Zhang Zhizhen; 6–2, 6–4	(Australia) Alex Bolt	(Japan) Rei Sakamoto (Japan) Hiroki Moriya	(Japan) Hayato Matsuoka (Australia) Li Tu (United States) Darwin Blanch (Australia) Dane Sweeny
February 9	Queensland International II; Brisbane, Australia; Hard – Challenger 75 – 32S/24Q/16D; Singles – Doubles	(Australia) Jake Delaney (Australia) Marc Polmans; 6–2, 6–3	(Australia) Matt Hulme (Australia) Kody Pearson	(Japan) Rei Sakamoto (Japan) Hiroki Moriya	(Japan) Hayato Matsuoka (Australia) Li Tu (United States) Darwin Blanch (Australia) Dane Sweeny
February 9	Tenerife Challenger II; Tenerife, Spain; Hard – Challenger 75 – 32S/24Q/16D; Singles – Doubles	(South Africa) Lloyd Harris; 7–5, 7–5	(Spain) Alejandro Moro Cañas	(Spain) Daniel Mérida (Spain) Pablo Llamas Ruiz	(Germany) Tom Gentzsch (Italy) Stefano Travaglia (Croatia) Luka Mikrut (Spain) Pol Martín Tiffon
February 9	Tenerife Challenger II; Tenerife, Spain; Hard – Challenger 75 – 32S/24Q/16D; Singles – Doubles	(Czech Republic) Filip Duda (Czech Republic) David Poljak; 7–6^{(7–0)}, 6–3	(Croatia) Luka Mikrut (Portugal) Tiago Pereira	(Spain) Daniel Mérida (Spain) Pablo Llamas Ruiz	(Germany) Tom Gentzsch (Italy) Stefano Travaglia (Croatia) Luka Mikrut (Spain) Pol Martín Tiffon
February 9	Baton Rouge Challenger; Baton Rouge, United States; Hard (i) – Challenger 50 – 32S/24Q/16D; Singles – Doubles	(United States) Stefan Dostanic; 6–4, 6–1	(Canada) Alexis Galarneau	(United States) Andre Ilagan (Ecuador) Andrés Andrade	(United States) Daniel Milavsky (United States) Cannon Kingsley (Poland) Olaf Pieczkowski (United States) Braden Shick
February 9	Baton Rouge Challenger; Baton Rouge, United States; Hard (i) – Challenger 50 – 32S/24Q/16D; Singles – Doubles	(United States) Alafia Ayeni (United States) Keegan Smith; 5–7, 6–3, [10–7]	(United States) Ronald Hohmann (United States) Andres Martin	(United States) Andre Ilagan (Ecuador) Andrés Andrade	(United States) Daniel Milavsky (United States) Cannon Kingsley (Poland) Olaf Pieczkowski (United States) Braden Shick
February 9	Chennai Open Challenger; Chennai, India; Hard – Challenger 50 – 32S/24Q/16D; Singles – Doubles	(Portugal) Frederico Ferreira Silva; 6–4, 6–7^{(10–12)}, 6–4	(Argentina) Federico Agustín Gómez	Ilia Simakin (Poland) Maks Kaśnikowski	(Greece) Ioannis Xilas; Petr Bar Biryukov (Switzerland) Luca Castelnuovo (Kazakhstan) Denis Yevseyev
February 9	Chennai Open Challenger; Chennai, India; Hard – Challenger 50 – 32S/24Q/16D; Singles – Doubles	(Thailand) Pruchya Isaro (India) Niki Kaliyanda Poonacha; 6–4, 6–4	(United Kingdom) Jay Clarke (India) Mukund Sasikumar	Ilia Simakin (Poland) Maks Kaśnikowski	(Greece) Ioannis Xilas; Petr Bar Biryukov (Switzerland) Luca Castelnuovo (Kazakhstan) Denis Yevseyev
February 16	Play In Challenger; Lille, France; Hard (i) – Challenger 125 – 32S/24Q/16D; Singles – Doubles	(France) Luca Van Assche; 6–2, 6–4	(Belgium) Alexander Blockx	(Switzerland) Jérôme Kym (France) Moïse Kouamé	(France) Titouan Droguet (France) Benjamin Bonzi (United States) Nishesh Basavareddy (France) Clément Chidekh
February 16	Play In Challenger; Lille, France; Hard (i) – Challenger 125 – 32S/24Q/16D; Singles – Doubles	Ivan Liutarevich (Poland) Filip Pieczonka; 6–4, 3–6, [10–8]	(Switzerland) Jakub Paul (Czech Republic) Matěj Vocel	(Switzerland) Jérôme Kym (France) Moïse Kouamé	(France) Titouan Droguet (France) Benjamin Bonzi (United States) Nishesh Basavareddy (France) Clément Chidekh
February 16	Metepec Open; Metepec, Mexico; Hard – Challenger 75 – 32S/24Q/16D; Singles – Doubles	(Croatia) Borna Gojo; 6–1, 6–4	(Canada) Alexis Galarneau	(Ecuador) Andrés Andrade (Mexico) Rodrigo Pacheco Méndez	(Argentina) Juan Pablo Ficovich (Australia) Edward Winter (United States) Stefan Kozlov (Australia) Bernard Tomic
February 16	Metepec Open; Metepec, Mexico; Hard – Challenger 75 – 32S/24Q/16D; Singles – Doubles	(United States) Pranav Kumar (United States) Karl Poling; 6–2, 6–3	(United Kingdom) Scott Duncan (United Kingdom) Ben Jones	(Ecuador) Andrés Andrade (Mexico) Rodrigo Pacheco Méndez	(Argentina) Juan Pablo Ficovich (Australia) Edward Winter (United States) Stefan Kozlov (Australia) Bernard Tomic
February 16	Delhi Open; New Delhi, India; Hard – Challenger 75 – 32S/24Q/16D; Singles – Doubles	(Greece) Stefanos Sakellaridis; 7–5, 4–6, 7–6^{(8–6)}	(United Kingdom) Oliver Crawford	(United Kingdom) Felix Gill (Japan) Rei Sakamoto	(Japan) Rio Noguchi (Belgium) Michael Geerts (United Kingdom) Jay Clarke (Italy) Federico Cinà
February 16	Delhi Open; New Delhi, India; Hard – Challenger 75 – 32S/24Q/16D; Singles – Doubles	(India) Siddhant Banthia (Bulgaria) Alexander Donski; 4–6, 6–4, [12–10]	(Thailand) Pruchya Isaro (India) Niki Kaliyanda Poonacha	(United Kingdom) Felix Gill (Japan) Rei Sakamoto	(Japan) Rio Noguchi (Belgium) Michael Geerts (United Kingdom) Jay Clarke (Italy) Federico Cinà
February 16	Challenger de Tigre; Tigre, Argentina; Clay – Challenger 50 – 32S/24Q/16D; Singles – Doubles	(Argentina) Guido Iván Justo; 4–6, 6–3, 6–0	(Argentina) Lautaro Midón	(Spain) Carlos Sánchez Jover (Peru) Gonzalo Bueno	(Argentina) Juan Manuel La Serna (Argentina) Gonzalo Villanueva (Brazil) Bruno Fernandez (Argentina) Andrea Collarini
February 16	Challenger de Tigre; Tigre, Argentina; Clay – Challenger 50 – 32S/24Q/16D; Singles – Doubles	(Argentina) Mariano Kestelboim (Bolivia) Juan Carlos Prado Ángelo; 6–4, 5–7, [10–7]	(Argentina) Santiago Rodríguez Taverna (Argentina) Gonzalo Villanueva	(Spain) Carlos Sánchez Jover (Peru) Gonzalo Bueno	(Argentina) Juan Manuel La Serna (Argentina) Gonzalo Villanueva (Brazil) Bruno Fernandez (Argentina) Andrea Collarini
February 23	Open Saint-Brieuc; Saint-Brieuc, France; Hard (i) – Challenger 100 – 32S/24Q/16D; Singles – Doubles	(Austria) Sebastian Ofner; 6–4, 7–6^{(7–4)}	(France) Pierre-Hugues Herbert	(France) Clément Chidekh (France) Hugo Gaston	(France) Laurent Lokoli (France) Matteo Martineau (France) Titouan Droguet (France) Ugo Blanchet
February 23	Open Saint-Brieuc; Saint-Brieuc, France; Hard (i) – Challenger 100 – 32S/24Q/16D; Singles – Doubles	(Switzerland) Jakub Paul (Czech Republic) Matěj Vocel; 6–7^{(4–7)}, 7–6^{(7–2)}, [10–5]	(France) Arthur Reymond (France) Luca Sanchez	(France) Clément Chidekh (France) Hugo Gaston	(France) Laurent Lokoli (France) Matteo Martineau (France) Titouan Droguet (France) Ugo Blanchet
February 23	Challenger Città di Lugano; Lugano, Switzerland; Hard (i) – Challenger 75 – 32S/24Q/16D; Singles – Doubles	(Hungary) Zsombor Piros; 7–5, 4–6, 6–3	(Austria) Joel Schwärzler	(Croatia) Matej Dodig (Switzerland) Mika Brunold	(Norway) Nicolai Budkov Kjær (Switzerland) Dominic Stricker (Czech Republic) Maxim Mrva (Switzerland) Marc-Andrea Hüsler
February 23	Challenger Città di Lugano; Lugano, Switzerland; Hard (i) – Challenger 75 – 32S/24Q/16D; Singles – Doubles	(Serbia) Stefan Latinović (Ukraine) Vitaliy Sachko; 6–3, 6–4	(Bosnia and Herzegovina) Mirza Bašić (Bosnia and Herzegovina) Nerman Fatić	(Croatia) Matej Dodig (Switzerland) Mika Brunold	(Norway) Nicolai Budkov Kjær (Switzerland) Dominic Stricker (Czech Republic) Maxim Mrva (Switzerland) Marc-Andrea Hüsler
February 23	Pune Challenger; Pune, India; Hard – Challenger 75 – 32S/24Q/16D; Singles – Doubles	(Italy) Federico Cinà; 6–3, 5–7, 7–6^{(7–1)}	(United Kingdom) Felix Gill	(Croatia) Duje Ajduković (Lithuania) Edas Butvilas	(India) Manas Dhamne (United Kingdom) Alastair Gray (Poland) Maks Kaśnikowski (Japan) Masamichi Imamura
February 23	Pune Challenger; Pune, India; Hard – Challenger 75 – 32S/24Q/16D; Singles – Doubles	(South Korea) Nam Ji-sung (Finland) Patrik Niklas-Salminen; 6–4, 6–7^{(1–7)}, [10–7]	(Thailand) Pruchya Isaro (India) Niki Kaliyanda Poonacha	(Croatia) Duje Ajduković (Lithuania) Edas Butvilas	(India) Manas Dhamne (United Kingdom) Alastair Gray (Poland) Maks Kaśnikowski (Japan) Masamichi Imamura
February 23	Challenger de Tigre II; Tigre, Argentina; Clay – Challenger 50 – 32S/24Q/16D; Singles – Doubles	(Argentina) Facundo Díaz Acosta; 1–6, 6–3, 6–0	(Spain) Miguel Damas	(Germany) Diego Dedura (Ecuador) Álvaro Guillén Meza	(Peru) Juan Pablo Varillas (Italy) Gianluca Cadenasso (Argentina) Juan Bautista Torres (Romania) Ștefan Paloși
February 23	Challenger de Tigre II; Tigre, Argentina; Clay – Challenger 50 – 32S/24Q/16D; Singles – Doubles	(Uruguay) Ignacio Carou (Argentina) Mariano Kestelboim; 7–6^{(7–4)}, 6–4	(Argentina) Valentín Basel (Argentina) Franco Ribero	(Germany) Diego Dedura (Ecuador) Álvaro Guillén Meza	(Peru) Juan Pablo Varillas (Italy) Gianluca Cadenasso (Argentina) Juan Bautista Torres (Romania) Ștefan Paloși

=== March ===
Week of	Tournament	Champions	Runners-up	Semifinalists	Quarterfinalists
March 2	Thionville Open; Thionville, France; Hard (i) – Challenger 100 – 32S/24Q/16D; Singles – Doubles	(Austria) Sebastian Ofner; 6–7^{(5–7)}, 6–3, 7–6^{(9–7)}	(Norway) Nicolai Budkov Kjær	(France) Hugo Gaston (Finland) Otto Virtanen	(France) Moïse Kouamé (Austria) Jurij Rodionov (France) Ugo Blanchet (United Kingdom) Jan Choinski
March 2	Thionville Open; Thionville, France; Hard (i) – Challenger 100 – 32S/24Q/16D; Singles – Doubles	Ivan Liutarevich (Poland) Filip Pieczonka; 7–6^{(13–11)}, 7–6^{(7–5)}	(United Kingdom) Joshua Paris (France) Luca Sanchez	(France) Hugo Gaston (Finland) Otto Virtanen	(France) Moïse Kouamé (Austria) Jurij Rodionov (France) Ugo Blanchet (United Kingdom) Jan Choinski
March 2	Brasília Tennis Open; Brasília, Brazil; Clay – Challenger 75 – 32S/24Q/16D; Singles – Doubles	(Portugal) Henrique Rocha; 6–4, 6–4	(Paraguay) Daniel Vallejo	(Brazil) Eduardo Ribeiro (Brazil) Thiago Monteiro	(Argentina) Facundo Díaz Acosta (Brazil) Gustavo Heide (Bolivia) Juan Carlos Prado Ángelo (Brazil) Pedro Boscardin Dias
March 2	Brasília Tennis Open; Brasília, Brazil; Clay – Challenger 75 – 32S/24Q/16D; Singles – Doubles	(Portugal) Jaime Faria (Portugal) Henrique Rocha; 6–3, 6–2	(Argentina) Mariano Kestelboim (Brazil) Marcelo Zormann	(Brazil) Eduardo Ribeiro (Brazil) Thiago Monteiro	(Argentina) Facundo Díaz Acosta (Brazil) Gustavo Heide (Bolivia) Juan Carlos Prado Ángelo (Brazil) Pedro Boscardin Dias
March 2	Rwanda Challenger; Kigali, Rwanda; Clay – Challenger 75 – 32S/24Q/16D; Singles – Doubles	(Austria) Joel Schwärzler; 7–6^{(7–5)}, 7–6^{(8–6)}	(Italy) Stefano Napolitano	(Italy) Marco Cecchinato (France) Arthur Géa	(Argentina) Marco Trungelliti (Switzerland) Jérôme Kym (France) Luka Pavlovic (France) Calvin Hemery
March 2	Rwanda Challenger; Kigali, Rwanda; Clay – Challenger 75 – 32S/24Q/16D; Singles – Doubles	(United Kingdom) Jay Clarke (Netherlands) Max Houkes; 6–4, 6–7^{(6–8)}, [12–10]	(India) Siddhant Banthia (Bulgaria) Alexander Donski	(Italy) Marco Cecchinato (France) Arthur Géa	(Argentina) Marco Trungelliti (Switzerland) Jérôme Kym (France) Luka Pavlovic (France) Calvin Hemery
March 2	Crete Challenger; Hersonissos, Greece; Hard – Challenger 50 – 32S/24Q/16D; Singles – Doubles	(United Kingdom) Toby Samuel; 6–3, 6–0	(United Kingdom) Harry Wendelken	(Bulgaria) Dimitar Kuzmanov (Greece) Stefanos Sakellaridis	(Italy) Lorenzo Giustino (Austria) Lukas Neumayer (Jordan) Abdullah Shelbayh (Greece) Ioannis Xilas
March 2	Crete Challenger; Hersonissos, Greece; Hard – Challenger 50 – 32S/24Q/16D; Singles – Doubles	(Italy) Jacopo Berrettini (Belgium) Kimmer Coppejans; 3–6, 6–1, [10–3]	(United Kingdom) Finn Bass (Bulgaria) Anthony Genov	(Bulgaria) Dimitar Kuzmanov (Greece) Stefanos Sakellaridis	(Italy) Lorenzo Giustino (Austria) Lukas Neumayer (Jordan) Abdullah Shelbayh (Greece) Ioannis Xilas
March 9	Arizona Tennis Classic; Phoenix, United States; Hard – Challenger 175 – 28S/16Q/16D; Singles – Doubles	(United States) Ethan Quinn; 7–6^{(7–1)}, 4–6, 7–5	(United States) Marcos Giron	(France) Corentin Moutet (United Kingdom) Billy Harris	(Georgia (country)) Nikoloz Basilashvili (Portugal) Nuno Borges (France) Adrian Mannarino (France) Benjamin Bonzi
March 9	Arizona Tennis Classic; Phoenix, United States; Hard – Challenger 175 – 28S/16Q/16D; Singles – Doubles	(Ecuador) Diego Hidalgo (United States) Patrik Trhac; 6–7^{(6–8)}, 6–3, [10–4]	(Monaco) Hugo Nys (France) Édouard Roger-Vasselin	(France) Corentin Moutet (United Kingdom) Billy Harris	(Georgia (country)) Nikoloz Basilashvili (Portugal) Nuno Borges (France) Adrian Mannarino (France) Benjamin Bonzi
March 9	Copa Cap Cana; Punta Cana, Dominican Republic; Hard – Challenger 175 – 28S/16Q/16D; Singles – Doubles	(Argentina) Mariano Navone; 7–5, 6–4	(Italy) Mattia Bellucci	(Australia) Adam Walton (Belgium) Alexander Blockx	(Serbia) Miomir Kecmanović (Belgium) Raphaël Collignon (Hong Kong) Coleman Wong (France) Valentin Royer
March 9	Copa Cap Cana; Punta Cana, Dominican Republic; Hard – Challenger 175 – 28S/16Q/16D; Singles – Doubles	(Monaco) Romain Arneodo (Brazil) Marcelo Demoliner; 7–6^{(7–2)}, 3–6, [10–6]	(Israel) Daniel Cukierman (United States) Trey Hilderbrand	(Australia) Adam Walton (Belgium) Alexander Blockx	(Serbia) Miomir Kecmanović (Belgium) Raphaël Collignon (Hong Kong) Coleman Wong (France) Valentin Royer
March 9	Rwanda Challenger II; Kigali, Rwanda; Clay – Challenger 100 – 32S/24Q/16D; Singles – Doubles	(Argentina) Marco Trungelliti; 4–6, 6–0, 6–3	(Italy) Marco Cecchinato	(Czech Republic) Zdeněk Kolář (France) Arthur Géa	(Netherlands) Max Houkes (Romania) Filip Cristian Jianu (Slovakia) Andrej Martin (Italy) Stefano Napolitano
March 9	Rwanda Challenger II; Kigali, Rwanda; Clay – Challenger 100 – 32S/24Q/16D; Singles – Doubles	(Serbia) Stefan Latinović (France) Luka Pavlovic; 7–6^{(7–5)}, 7–6^{(7–2)}	(India) Siddhant Banthia (Bulgaria) Alexander Donski	(Czech Republic) Zdeněk Kolář (France) Arthur Géa	(Netherlands) Max Houkes (Romania) Filip Cristian Jianu (Slovakia) Andrej Martin (Italy) Stefano Napolitano
March 9	Challenger La Manche; Cherbourg-en-Cotentin, France; Hard (i) – Challenger 75 – 32S/24Q/16D; Singles – Doubles	Pavel Kotov; 6–2, 7–5	(Italy) Filippo Romano	(Croatia) Borna Gojo (Austria) Jurij Rodionov	(Switzerland) Rémy Bertola (United States) Murphy Cassone (Belgium) Gauthier Onclin (France) Clément Tabur
March 9	Challenger La Manche; Cherbourg-en-Cotentin, France; Hard (i) – Challenger 75 – 32S/24Q/16D; Singles – Doubles	(Canada) Cleeve Harper (United Kingdom) David Stevenson; 4–6, 6–3, [10–8]	(Poland) Karol Drzewiecki (Poland) Szymon Walków	(Croatia) Borna Gojo (Austria) Jurij Rodionov	(Switzerland) Rémy Bertola (United States) Murphy Cassone (Belgium) Gauthier Onclin (France) Clément Tabur
March 9	Challenger de Santiago; Santiago, Chile; Clay – Challenger 75 – 32S/24Q/16D; Singles – Doubles	(Argentina) Genaro Alberto Olivieri; 6–4, 6–4	(Portugal) Henrique Rocha	(Brazil) Thiago Monteiro (Brazil) Pedro Boscardin Dias	(Paraguay) Daniel Vallejo (United States) Nicolas Moreno de Alboran (Spain) Nikolás Sánchez Izquierdo (Peru) Gonzalo Bueno
March 9	Challenger de Santiago; Santiago, Chile; Clay – Challenger 75 – 32S/24Q/16D; Singles – Doubles	(Italy) Gianluca Cadenasso (Brazil) Paulo André Saraiva dos Santos; 6–3, 7–5	(Mexico) Miguel Ángel Reyes-Varela (Bolivia) Federico Zeballos	(Brazil) Thiago Monteiro (Brazil) Pedro Boscardin Dias	(Paraguay) Daniel Vallejo (United States) Nicolas Moreno de Alboran (Spain) Nikolás Sánchez Izquierdo (Peru) Gonzalo Bueno
March 9	Crete Challenger II; Hersonissos, Greece; Hard – Challenger 50 – 32S/24Q/16D; Singles – Doubles	(United Kingdom) Toby Samuel; 6–2, 6–3	(Czech Republic) Maxim Mrva	(United Kingdom) Paul Jubb (United States) Stefan Dostanic	(Italy) Lorenzo Giustino (Bulgaria) Petr Nesterov (Belgium) Kimmer Coppejans (France) Robin Bertrand
March 9	Crete Challenger II; Hersonissos, Greece; Hard – Challenger 50 – 32S/24Q/16D; Singles – Doubles	(Belgium) Michael Geerts (Portugal) Tiago Pereira; 3–6, 6–4, [10–5]	(Bulgaria) Petr Nesterov (Ukraine) Oleksandr Ovcharenko	(United Kingdom) Paul Jubb (United States) Stefan Dostanic	(Italy) Lorenzo Giustino (Bulgaria) Petr Nesterov (Belgium) Kimmer Coppejans (France) Robin Bertrand
March 16	Paraguay Open; Asunción, Paraguay; Clay – Challenger 75 – 32S/24Q/16D; Singles – Doubles	(Italy) Gianluca Cadenasso; 7–6^{(7–5)}, 6–0	(Uruguay) Franco Roncadelli	(Peru) Juan Pablo Varillas (Argentina) Lautaro Midón	(Brazil) João Lucas Reis da Silva (Argentina) Alex Barrena (Brazil) Pedro Boscardin Dias (Portugal) Jaime Faria
March 16	Paraguay Open; Asunción, Paraguay; Clay – Challenger 75 – 32S/24Q/16D; Singles – Doubles	(Argentina) Mariano Kestelboim (Brazil) Marcelo Zormann; 6–4, 7–5	(United States) Mac Kiger (United States) Reese Stalder	(Peru) Juan Pablo Varillas (Argentina) Lautaro Midón	(Brazil) João Lucas Reis da Silva (Argentina) Alex Barrena (Brazil) Pedro Boscardin Dias (Portugal) Jaime Faria
March 16	Morelos Open; Cuernavaca, Mexico; Hard – Challenger 75 – 32S/24Q/16D; Singles – Doubles	(United States) Michael Mmoh; 4–6, 6–4, 6–3	(Japan) Taro Daniel	(United States) Andres Martin (United States) Tyler Zink	(Argentina) Facundo Mena (United States) Alafia Ayeni (Mexico) Rodrigo Pacheco Méndez (Switzerland) Marc-Andrea Hüsler
March 16	Morelos Open; Cuernavaca, Mexico; Hard – Challenger 75 – 32S/24Q/16D; Singles – Doubles	(Ecuador) Andrés Andrade (Argentina) Federico Agustín Gómez; 6–3, 7–6^{(7–4)}	(India) Rithvik Choudary Bollipalli (India) Arjun Kadhe	(United States) Andres Martin (United States) Tyler Zink	(Argentina) Facundo Mena (United States) Alafia Ayeni (Mexico) Rodrigo Pacheco Méndez (Switzerland) Marc-Andrea Hüsler
March 16	Murcia Open; Murcia, Spain; Clay – Challenger 75 – 32S/24Q/16D; Singles – Doubles	(Spain) Pablo Carreño Busta; 6–4, 6–3	(Spain) Roberto Carballés Baena	(Netherlands) Jesper de Jong (Belgium) Kimmer Coppejans	(Spain) Pablo Llamas Ruiz (Austria) Sebastian Ofner (Italy) Andrea Pellegrino (Belgium) Gilles-Arnaud Bailly
March 16	Murcia Open; Murcia, Spain; Clay – Challenger 75 – 32S/24Q/16D; Singles – Doubles	(Lebanon) Benjamin Hassan (Austria) Sebastian Ofner; 6–3, 6–4	(Poland) Karol Drzewiecki (Poland) Piotr Matuszewski	(Netherlands) Jesper de Jong (Belgium) Kimmer Coppejans	(Spain) Pablo Llamas Ruiz (Austria) Sebastian Ofner (Italy) Andrea Pellegrino (Belgium) Gilles-Arnaud Bailly
March 16	Zadar Open; Zadar, Croatia; Clay – Challenger 75 – 32S/24Q/16D; Singles – Doubles	(Italy) Stefano Travaglia; 2–1 ret.	(France) Arthur Géa	(Croatia) Matej Dodig (France) Kyrian Jacquet	(Croatia) Duje Ajduković (Slovakia) Alex Molčan (Austria) Lukas Neumayer (Czech Republic) Jonáš Forejtek
March 16	Zadar Open; Zadar, Croatia; Clay – Challenger 75 – 32S/24Q/16D; Singles – Doubles	(Ecuador) Gonzalo Escobar (Croatia) Nino Serdarušić; 6–1, 6–2	(Italy) Simone Agostini (Czech Republic) Jonáš Forejtek	(Croatia) Matej Dodig (France) Kyrian Jacquet	(Croatia) Duje Ajduković (Slovakia) Alex Molčan (Austria) Lukas Neumayer (Czech Republic) Jonáš Forejtek
March 23	Morelia Open; Morelia, Mexico; Hard – Challenger 125 – 32S/24Q/16D; Singles – Doubles	(Croatia) Borna Gojo; 7–6^{(7–5)}, 6–2	(Argentina) Juan Pablo Ficovich	(Colombia) Nicolás Mejía (France) Luka Pavlovic	(Mexico) Rodrigo Pacheco Méndez (Luxembourg) Chris Rodesch (Australia) Tristan Schoolkate (Canada) Alexis Galarneau
March 23	Morelia Open; Morelia, Mexico; Hard – Challenger 125 – 32S/24Q/16D; Singles – Doubles	(Ecuador) Diego Hidalgo (United States) Patrik Trhac; 7–6^{(7–5)}, 7–6^{(7–4)}	(United States) Nathaniel Lammons (United States) Jackson Withrow	(Colombia) Nicolás Mejía (France) Luka Pavlovic	(Mexico) Rodrigo Pacheco Méndez (Luxembourg) Chris Rodesch (Australia) Tristan Schoolkate (Canada) Alexis Galarneau
March 23	Napoli Tennis Cup; Naples, Italy; Clay – Challenger 125 – 32S/24Q/16D; Singles – Doubles	(Serbia) Hamad Medjedovic; 6–2, 6–4	(Germany) Daniel Altmaier	(Italy) Federico Bondioli (Ukraine) Vitaliy Sachko	(Italy) Enrico Dalla Valle (Italy) Michele Ribecai (France) Alexandre Müller (Italy) Federico Cinà
March 23	Napoli Tennis Cup; Naples, Italy; Clay – Challenger 125 – 32S/24Q/16D; Singles – Doubles	(Switzerland) Jakub Paul (Czech Republic) Matěj Vocel; 6–2, 6–4	(Germany) Tim Rühl (Netherlands) Mick Veldheer	(Italy) Federico Bondioli (Ukraine) Vitaliy Sachko	(Italy) Enrico Dalla Valle (Italy) Michele Ribecai (France) Alexandre Müller (Italy) Federico Cinà
March 23	Montemar Challenger; Alicante, Spain; Clay – Challenger 100 – 32S/24Q/16D; Singles – Doubles	(Spain) Pablo Llamas Ruiz; 6–4, 6–2	(Spain) Pablo Carreño Busta	(Austria) Sebastian Ofner; Roman Safiullin	(Italy) Marco Cecchinato (Spain) Pedro Martínez (Netherlands) Max Houkes (Lithuania) Edas Butvilas
March 23	Montemar Challenger; Alicante, Spain; Clay – Challenger 100 – 32S/24Q/16D; Singles – Doubles	(Poland) Szymon Kielan (Portugal) Tiago Pereira; 4–6, 6–3, [15–13]	(Colombia) Nicolás Barrientos (Uruguay) Ariel Behar	(Austria) Sebastian Ofner; Roman Safiullin	(Italy) Marco Cecchinato (Spain) Pedro Martínez (Netherlands) Max Houkes (Lithuania) Edas Butvilas
March 23	Latin America Open; São Paulo, Brazil; Clay – Challenger 100 – 32S/24Q/16D; Singles – Doubles	(Argentina) Román Andrés Burruchaga; 6–7^{(5–7)}, 6–4, 6–4	(Portugal) Jaime Faria	(Bolivia) Hugo Dellien (Bolivia) Juan Carlos Prado Ángelo	(United States) Emilio Nava (Chile) Tomás Barrios Vera (Argentina) Alex Barrena (Peru) Gonzalo Bueno
March 23	Latin America Open; São Paulo, Brazil; Clay – Challenger 100 – 32S/24Q/16D; Singles – Doubles	(Brazil) Gustavo Heide (Brazil) Guto Miguel; 6–4, 6–2	(Brazil) Felipe Meligeni Alves (Brazil) João Lucas Reis da Silva	(Bolivia) Hugo Dellien (Bolivia) Juan Carlos Prado Ángelo	(United States) Emilio Nava (Chile) Tomás Barrios Vera (Argentina) Alex Barrena (Peru) Gonzalo Bueno
March 23	Kia Open Bucaramanga; Bucaramanga, Colombia; Clay – Challenger 50 – 32S/24Q/16D; Singles – Doubles	(Chile) Matias Soto; 6–3, 6–3	(Argentina) Guido Iván Justo	(Uruguay) Franco Roncadelli (Chile) Nicolás Villalón	(Switzerland) Johan Nikles (Argentina) Lorenzo Joaquín Rodríguez (Argentina) Juan Manuel La Serna (Colombia) Daniel Salazar
March 23	Kia Open Bucaramanga; Bucaramanga, Colombia; Clay – Challenger 50 – 32S/24Q/16D; Singles – Doubles	(Colombia) Juan Sebastián Gómez (Chile) Matías Soto; 6–2, 6–4	(Ukraine) Vladyslav Orlov (Colombia) Adrià Soriano Barrera	(Uruguay) Franco Roncadelli (Chile) Nicolás Villalón	(Switzerland) Johan Nikles (Argentina) Lorenzo Joaquín Rodríguez (Argentina) Juan Manuel La Serna (Colombia) Daniel Salazar
March 23	Split Open; Split, Croatia; Clay – Challenger 50 – 32S/24Q/16D; Singles – Doubles	(Croatia) Mili Poljičak; 6–4, 6–4	(Germany) Tom Gentzsch	(Belgium) Kimmer Coppejans (France) Sascha Gueymard Wayenburg	(Croatia) Matej Dodig (Austria) Lukas Neumayer (Bosnia and Herzegovina) Andrej Nedić (Bulgaria) Alexander Vasilev
March 23	Split Open; Split, Croatia; Clay – Challenger 50 – 32S/24Q/16D; Singles – Doubles	(Slovakia) Miloš Karol (Croatia) Mili Poljičak; 6–2, 6–2	(Bosnia and Herzegovina) Mirza Bašić (Bosnia and Herzegovina) Andrej Nedić	(Belgium) Kimmer Coppejans (France) Sascha Gueymard Wayenburg	(Croatia) Matej Dodig (Austria) Lukas Neumayer (Bosnia and Herzegovina) Andrej Nedić (Bulgaria) Alexander Vasilev
March 23	Yokkaichi Challenger; Yokkaichi, Japan; Hard – Challenger 50 – 32S/24Q/16D; Singles – Doubles	(Japan) Rio Noguchi; 5–7, 7–6^{(7–5)}, 6–3	(Japan) Yasutaka Uchiyama	(United Kingdom) Harry Wendelken (Japan) Hayato Matsuoka	(United Kingdom) Liam Broady (Japan) Yuta Shimizu (China) Sun Fajing (South Korea) Kwon Soon-woo
March 23	Yokkaichi Challenger; Yokkaichi, Japan; Hard – Challenger 50 – 32S/24Q/16D; Singles – Doubles	(China) Sun Fajing (Chinese Taipei) Wu Tung-lin; 7–6^{(8–6)}, 6–3	(Australia) Ethan Cook (Australia) Tai Sach	(United Kingdom) Harry Wendelken (Japan) Hayato Matsuoka	(United Kingdom) Liam Broady (Japan) Yuta Shimizu (China) Sun Fajing (South Korea) Kwon Soon-woo
March 30	Open Menorca; Menorca, Spain; Clay – Challenger 100 – 32S/24Q/16D; Singles – Doubles	(Italy) Raúl Brancaccio; 6–1, 6–4	(Spain) Àlex Martínez	(Spain) Daniel Rincón (United States) Dali Blanch	(Spain) Pol Martín Tiffon (Spain) Sergio Callejón Hernando (Czech Republic) Jonáš Forejtek (Spain) Alejo Sánchez Quílez
March 30	Open Menorca; Menorca, Spain; Clay – Challenger 100 – 32S/24Q/16D; Singles – Doubles	(Thailand) Pruchya Isaro (India) Niki Kaliyanda Poonacha; 6–3, 7–6^{(7–3)}	(India) Siddhant Banthia (Bulgaria) Alexander Donski	(Spain) Daniel Rincón (United States) Dali Blanch	(Spain) Pol Martín Tiffon (Spain) Sergio Callejón Hernando (Czech Republic) Jonáš Forejtek (Spain) Alejo Sánchez Quílez
March 30	Open Città della Disfida; Barletta, Italy; Clay – Challenger 75 – 32S/24Q/16D; Singles – Doubles	(Austria) Lukas Neumayer; 2–6, 6–3, 6–3	(Italy) Michele Ribecai	(Ukraine) Vitaliy Sachko (United Kingdom) Felix Gill	(Croatia) Mili Poljičak (Belgium) Kimmer Coppejans (Italy) Enrico Dalla Valle (Czech Republic) Martin Krumich
March 30	Open Città della Disfida; Barletta, Italy; Clay – Challenger 75 – 32S/24Q/16D; Singles – Doubles	(Czech Republic) Filip Duda (Serbia) Stefan Latinović; 7–6^{(7–4)}, 6–7^{(6–8)}, [13–11]	(Slovakia) Miloš Karol (Ukraine) Vitaliy Sachko	(Ukraine) Vitaliy Sachko (United Kingdom) Felix Gill	(Croatia) Mili Poljičak (Belgium) Kimmer Coppejans (Italy) Enrico Dalla Valle (Czech Republic) Martin Krumich
March 30	Banorte Tennis Open; San Luis Potosí, Mexico; Clay – Challenger 75 – 32S/24Q/16D; Singles – Doubles	(Colombia) Nicolás Mejía; 7–6^{(8–6)}, 6–2	(Australia) James Duckworth	(Mexico) Rodrigo Pacheco Méndez (Australia) Tristan Schoolkate	(Kazakhstan) Beibit Zhukayev (Argentina) Juan Pablo Ficovich (Chile) Matías Soto (Argentina) Facundo Mena
March 30	Banorte Tennis Open; San Luis Potosí, Mexico; Clay – Challenger 75 – 32S/24Q/16D; Singles – Doubles	(Australia) Jake Delaney (Australia) Tristan Schoolkate; 6–4, 7–6^{(7–2)}	(Argentina) Facundo Mena (Mexico) Rodrigo Pacheco Méndez	(Mexico) Rodrigo Pacheco Méndez (Australia) Tristan Schoolkate	(Kazakhstan) Beibit Zhukayev (Argentina) Juan Pablo Ficovich (Chile) Matías Soto (Argentina) Facundo Mena
March 30	São Léo Open; São Leopoldo, Brazil; Clay – Challenger 75 – 32S/24Q/16D; Singles – Doubles	(Argentina) Facundo Díaz Acosta; 5–7, 6–2, 6–4	(Bolivia) Hugo Dellien	(Brazil) Paulo André Saraiva dos Santos (Brazil) Gustavo Heide	(Bolivia) Murkel Dellien (Peru) Conner Huertas del Pino (Argentina) Juan Manuel La Serna (Argentina) Lautaro Midón
March 30	São Léo Open; São Leopoldo, Brazil; Clay – Challenger 75 – 32S/24Q/16D; Singles – Doubles	(Bolivia) Boris Arias (Denmark) Johannes Ingildsen; 6–3, 4–6, [10–8]	(Spain) Nicolás Álvarez Varona (Spain) Mario Mansilla Díez	(Brazil) Paulo André Saraiva dos Santos (Brazil) Gustavo Heide	(Bolivia) Murkel Dellien (Peru) Conner Huertas del Pino (Argentina) Juan Manuel La Serna (Argentina) Lautaro Midón
March 30	Miyazaki Challenger; Miyazaki, Japan; Hard – Challenger 50 – 32S/24Q/16D; Singles – Doubles	(United Kingdom) Liam Broady; 3–6, 6–2, 6–2	(United Kingdom) Harry Wendelken	(Australia) Blake Ellis (Chinese Taipei) Wu Tung-lin	(United States) Andre Ilagan (Serbia) Ognjen Milić (Chinese Taipei) Hsu Yu-hsiou (Japan) Hiroki Moriya
March 30	Miyazaki Challenger; Miyazaki, Japan; Hard – Challenger 50 – 32S/24Q/16D; Singles – Doubles	(South Korea) Nam Ji-sung (Finland) Patrik Niklas-Salminen; 7–5, 6–3	(Japan) Yuta Shimizu (Japan) James Trotter	(Australia) Blake Ellis (Chinese Taipei) Wu Tung-lin	(United States) Andre Ilagan (Serbia) Ognjen Milić (Chinese Taipei) Hsu Yu-hsiou (Japan) Hiroki Moriya

=== April ===
Week of	Tournament	Champions	Runners-up	Semifinalists	Quarterfinalists
April 6	Mexico City Open; Mexico City, Mexico; Clay – Challenger 125 – 32S/24Q/16D; Singles – Doubles	(Australia) James Duckworth; 6–7^{(7–9)}, 7–6^{(7–3)}, 6–2	(Italy) Stefano Napolitano	(Belgium) Tibo Colson (France) Luka Pavlovic	(Kazakhstan) Beibit Zhukayev (Mexico) Alex Hernández (Mexico) Rodrigo Pacheco Méndez (Australia) Tristan Schoolkate
April 6	Mexico City Open; Mexico City, Mexico; Clay – Challenger 125 – 32S/24Q/16D; Singles – Doubles	(Mexico) Santiago González (United States) Ryan Seggerman; 6–4, 4–6, [10–8]	(Ecuador) Diego Hidalgo (United States) Patrik Trhac	(Belgium) Tibo Colson (France) Luka Pavlovic	(Kazakhstan) Beibit Zhukayev (Mexico) Alex Hernández (Mexico) Rodrigo Pacheco Méndez (Australia) Tristan Schoolkate
April 6	Monza Open; Monza, Italy; Clay – Challenger 125 – 32S/24Q/16D; Singles – Doubles	(Belgium) Raphaël Collignon; 7–6^{(7–2)}, 6–3	(Croatia) Dino Prižmić	(Spain) Martín Landaluce (Italy) Mattia Bellucci	(France) Luca Van Assche (France) Hugo Gaston (Italy) Stefano Travaglia (France) Valentin Royer
April 6	Monza Open; Monza, Italy; Clay – Challenger 125 – 32S/24Q/16D; Singles – Doubles	(Belgium) Sander Gillé (Netherlands) Sem Verbeek; 4–6, 7–6^{(7–3)}, [10–8]	(Switzerland) Jakub Paul (Czech Republic) Matěj Vocel	(Spain) Martín Landaluce (Italy) Mattia Bellucci	(France) Luca Van Assche (France) Hugo Gaston (Italy) Stefano Travaglia (France) Valentin Royer
April 6	Campeonato Internacional de Tênis de Campinas; Campinas, Brazil; Clay – Challenger 75 – 32S/24Q/16D; Singles – Doubles	(Brazil) Gustavo Heide; 6–2, 7–5	(Peru) Gonzalo Bueno	(Argentina) Lautaro Midón (Brazil) Pedro Boscardin Dias	(Argentina) Hernán Casanova (Peru) Juan Pablo Varillas (Argentina) Guido Iván Justo (Ecuador) Álvaro Guillén Meza
April 6	Campeonato Internacional de Tênis de Campinas; Campinas, Brazil; Clay – Challenger 75 – 32S/24Q/16D; Singles – Doubles	(Spain) Nicolás Álvarez Varona (Spain) Mario Mansilla Díez; 3–6, 6–1, [10–8]	(Argentina) Mariano Kestelboim (Brazil) Marcelo Zormann	(Argentina) Lautaro Midón (Brazil) Pedro Boscardin Dias	(Argentina) Hernán Casanova (Peru) Juan Pablo Varillas (Argentina) Guido Iván Justo (Ecuador) Álvaro Guillén Meza
April 6	Open Comunidad de Madrid; Madrid, Spain; Clay – Challenger 75 – 32S/24Q/16D; Singles – Doubles	(Hungary) Zsombor Piros; 7–5, 6–2	(Austria) Jurij Rodionov	(United Kingdom) Toby Samuel (Chile) Nicolás Jarry	(Austria) Joel Schwärzler (Spain) Alejandro Moro Cañas (Bosnia and Herzegovina) Nerman Fatić (Spain) Nikolás Sánchez Izquierdo
April 6	Open Comunidad de Madrid; Madrid, Spain; Clay – Challenger 75 – 32S/24Q/16D; Singles – Doubles	(Czech Republic) Andrew Paulson (Czech Republic) Michael Vrbenský; 2–6, 6–4, [10–8]	(United States) George Goldhoff (United States) Trey Hilderbrand	(United Kingdom) Toby Samuel (Chile) Nicolás Jarry	(Austria) Joel Schwärzler (Spain) Alejandro Moro Cañas (Bosnia and Herzegovina) Nerman Fatić (Spain) Nikolás Sánchez Izquierdo
April 6	Sarasota Open; Sarasota, United States; Clay – Challenger 75 – 32S/24Q/16D; Singles – Doubles	(China) Wu Yibing; 6–1, 4–6, 6–3	(United States) Stefan Dostanic	(United States) Darwin Blanch (Ecuador) Andy Andrade	(Brazil) Daniel Dutra da Silva (Bolivia) Hugo Dellien (Estonia) Daniil Glinka (United States) Nishesh Basavareddy
April 6	Sarasota Open; Sarasota, United States; Clay – Challenger 75 – 32S/24Q/16D; Singles – Doubles	(Czech Republic) Hynek Bartoň (United States) Martin Damm; 6–2, 6–1	(United States) Garrett Johns (United States) Theodore Winegar	(United States) Darwin Blanch (Ecuador) Andy Andrade	(Brazil) Daniel Dutra da Silva (Bolivia) Hugo Dellien (Estonia) Daniil Glinka (United States) Nishesh Basavareddy
April 6	Wuning Challenger; Wuning, China; Hard – Challenger 50 – 32S/24Q/16D; Singles – Doubles	Pavel Kotov; 4–6, 6–3, 6–4	(United Kingdom) Harry Wendelken	(Australia) Li Tu (China) Sun Fajing	(France) Clément Chidekh (Australia) Kody Pearson (Canada) Justin Boulais; Ilia Simakin
April 6	Wuning Challenger; Wuning, China; Hard – Challenger 50 – 32S/24Q/16D; Singles – Doubles	(Australia) Joshua Charlton (United Kingdom) Ben Jones; 6–4, 6–2	(Belgium) Buvaysar Gadamauri (United Kingdom) Giles Hussey	(Australia) Li Tu (China) Sun Fajing	(France) Clément Chidekh (Australia) Kody Pearson (Canada) Justin Boulais; Ilia Simakin
April 13	Busan Open; Busan, South Korea; Hard – Challenger 125 – 32S/24Q/16D; Singles – Doubles	(Switzerland) Leandro Riedi; 3–6, 6–3, 6–2	(China) Bu Yunchaokete	(United Kingdom) Liam Broady (Australia) Alex Bolt	(Denmark) August Holmgren (Japan) Sho Shimabukuro (Japan) Rio Noguchi (Australia) Adam Walton
April 13	Busan Open; Busan, South Korea; Hard – Challenger 125 – 32S/24Q/16D; Singles – Doubles	(India) Anirudh Chandrasekar (Japan) Takeru Yuzuki; 4–6, 6–3, [10–7]	(Netherlands) Jean-Julien Rojer (United States) Theodore Winegar	(United Kingdom) Liam Broady (Australia) Alex Bolt	(Denmark) August Holmgren (Japan) Sho Shimabukuro (Japan) Rio Noguchi (Australia) Adam Walton
April 13	Open de Oeiras; Oeiras, Portugal; Clay – Challenger 125 – 32S/24Q/16D; Singles – Doubles	Roman Safiullin; 6–1, 6–2	(France) Valentin Royer	(Netherlands) Max Houkes (Portugal) Henrique Rocha	(Austria) Joel Schwärzler (Portugal) Frederico Ferreira Silva (Portugal) Jaime Faria (Spain) Pablo Llamas Ruiz
April 13	Open de Oeiras; Oeiras, Portugal; Clay – Challenger 125 – 32S/24Q/16D; Singles – Doubles	(India) Sriram Balaji (Austria) Neil Oberleitner; 6–7^{(7–9)}, 6–4, [11–9]	(Colombia) Nicolás Barrientos (Uruguay) Ariel Behar	(Netherlands) Max Houkes (Portugal) Henrique Rocha	(Austria) Joel Schwärzler (Portugal) Frederico Ferreira Silva (Portugal) Jaime Faria (Spain) Pablo Llamas Ruiz
April 13	Santa Cruz Challenger; Santa Cruz de la Sierra, Bolivia; Clay – Challenger 75 – 32S/24Q/16D; Singles – Doubles	(Bolivia) Hugo Dellien; 6–4, 7–5	(Bolivia) Juan Carlos Prado Ángelo	(Argentina) Valerio Aboian (Chile) Matías Soto	(Argentina) Santiago Rodríguez Taverna (Brazil) Thiago Seyboth Wild (Peru) Gonzalo Bueno (Argentina) Juan Bautista Torres
April 13	Santa Cruz Challenger; Santa Cruz de la Sierra, Bolivia; Clay – Challenger 75 – 32S/24Q/16D; Singles – Doubles	(Argentina) Hernán Casanova (Argentina) Santiago Rodríguez Taverna; 7–5, 6–4	(Argentina) Mariano Kestelboim (Bolivia) Federico Zeballos	(Argentina) Valerio Aboian (Chile) Matías Soto	(Argentina) Santiago Rodríguez Taverna (Brazil) Thiago Seyboth Wild (Peru) Gonzalo Bueno (Argentina) Juan Bautista Torres
April 13	Tallahassee Tennis Challenger; Tallahassee, United States; Clay – Challenger 75 – 32S/24Q/16D; Singles – Doubles	(France) Clément Tabur; 6–4, 1–0 ret.	(Brazil) João Lucas Reis da Silva	(United States) Jack Kennedy (United States) Michael Mmoh	(Brazil) Pedro Boscardin Dias (Estonia) Daniil Glinka (United States) Tyler Zink (Czech Republic) Hynek Bartoň
April 13	Tallahassee Tennis Challenger; Tallahassee, United States; Clay – Challenger 75 – 32S/24Q/16D; Singles – Doubles	(United States) Stefan Dostanic (United States) Alex Rybakov; 6–4, 6–2	(Canada) Cleeve Harper (United Kingdom) David Stevenson	(United States) Jack Kennedy (United States) Michael Mmoh	(Brazil) Pedro Boscardin Dias (Estonia) Daniil Glinka (United States) Tyler Zink (Czech Republic) Hynek Bartoň
April 13	Wuning Challenger II; Wuning, China; Hard – Challenger 50 – 32S/24Q/16D; Singles – Doubles	(China) Sun Fajing; 5–7, 6–4, 7–5	(Australia) Li Tu	(Uzbekistan) Sergey Fomin (United Kingdom) Charles Broom	(South Korea) Shin San-hui (United Kingdom) Giles Hussey (Australia) Blake Ellis (Belgium) Buvaysar Gadamauri
April 13	Wuning Challenger II; Wuning, China; Hard – Challenger 50 – 32S/24Q/16D; Singles – Doubles	(Chinese Taipei) Jason Jung (Japan) Kaito Uesugi; 6–7^{(3–7)}, 6–3, [10–6]	(United States) Keegan Smith (China) Zheng Baoluo	(Uzbekistan) Sergey Fomin (United Kingdom) Charles Broom	(South Korea) Shin San-hui (United Kingdom) Giles Hussey (Australia) Blake Ellis (Belgium) Buvaysar Gadamauri
April 20	Gwangju Open; Gwangju, South Korea; Hard – Challenger 75 – 32S/24Q/16D; Singles – Doubles	(South Korea) Kwon Soon-woo; 6–4, 7–5	(Denmark) August Holmgren	(Switzerland) Leandro Riedi (Chinese Taipei) Hsu Yu-hsiou	(Japan) Yuta Shimizu (Australia) James McCabe (South Korea) Chung Hyeon (Australia) Tristan Schoolkate
April 20	Gwangju Open; Gwangju, South Korea; Hard – Challenger 75 – 32S/24Q/16D; Singles – Doubles	(United States) Mac Kiger (United States) Reese Stalder; 6–4, 6–7^{(7–9)}, [10–8]	(India) Anirudh Chandrasekar (Japan) Takeru Yuzuki	(Switzerland) Leandro Riedi (Chinese Taipei) Hsu Yu-hsiou	(Japan) Yuta Shimizu (Australia) James McCabe (South Korea) Chung Hyeon (Australia) Tristan Schoolkate
April 20	Garden Open; Rome, Italy; Clay – Challenger 75 – 32S/24Q/16D; Singles – Doubles	(Italy) Andrea Guerrieri; 6–4, 2–6, 6–1	(Czech Republic) Dalibor Svrčina	(Italy) Jacopo Vasamì (Spain) Pol Martín Tiffon	(Romania) Cezar Crețu (Greece) Stefanos Sakellaridis (Romania) Filip Cristian Jianu (Italy) Andrea Vavassori
April 20	Garden Open; Rome, Italy; Clay – Challenger 75 – 32S/24Q/16D; Singles – Doubles	(Colombia) Nicolás Barrientos (Uruguay) Ariel Behar; 7–6^{(7–4)}, 4–6, [10–7]	(Slovakia) Miloš Karol (Czech Republic) Andrew Paulson	(Italy) Jacopo Vasamì (Spain) Pol Martín Tiffon	(Romania) Cezar Crețu (Greece) Stefanos Sakellaridis (Romania) Filip Cristian Jianu (Italy) Andrea Vavassori
April 20	Savannah Challenger; Savannah, United States; Clay – Challenger 75 – 32S/24Q/16D; Singles – Doubles	(United States) Nishesh Basavareddy; 6–3, 6–0	(United States) Jack Kennedy	(Switzerland) Kilian Feldbausch (Colombia) Daniel Elahi Galán	(France) Clément Tabur (Dominican Republic) Nick Hardt (United States) Mitchell Krueger (Ecuador) Andy Andrade
April 20	Savannah Challenger; Savannah, United States; Clay – Challenger 75 – 32S/24Q/16D; Singles – Doubles	(Canada) Cleeve Harper (United Kingdom) David Stevenson; 7–6^{(7–4)}, 6–2	(Venezuela) Luis David Martínez (Colombia) Cristian Rodríguez	(Switzerland) Kilian Feldbausch (Colombia) Daniel Elahi Galán	(France) Clément Tabur (Dominican Republic) Nick Hardt (United States) Mitchell Krueger (Ecuador) Andy Andrade
April 20	Côte d'Ivoire Open; Abidjan, Ivory Coast; Hard – Challenger 50 – 32S/24Q/16D; Singles – Doubles	(Belgium) Gauthier Onclin; 7–6^{(7–5)}, 7–6^{(7–2)}	(United Kingdom) Hamish Stewart	(France) Calvin Hemery (France) Maxime Chazal	(Turkey) Mert Alkaya (France) Florent Bax (Morocco) Karim Bennani (Turkey) Yankı Erel
April 20	Côte d'Ivoire Open; Abidjan, Ivory Coast; Hard – Challenger 50 – 32S/24Q/16D; Singles – Doubles	(Belgium) Michael Geerts (Netherlands) Niels Visker; 6–3, 7–6^{(7–4)}	(Ivory Coast) Eliakim Coulibaly (France) Calvin Hemery	(France) Calvin Hemery (France) Maxime Chazal	(Turkey) Mert Alkaya (France) Florent Bax (Morocco) Karim Bennani (Turkey) Yankı Erel
April 20	Shymkent Challenger; Shymkent, Kazakhstan; Clay – Challenger 50 – 32S/24Q/16D; Singles – Doubles	(Uzbekistan) Sergey Fomin; 6–3, 7–5	(Kazakhstan) Timofey Skatov	(France) Antoine Ghibaudo (Bosnia and Herzegovina) Andrej Nedić	Daniil Ostapenkov (Netherlands) Jelle Sels (United States) Dali Blanch (Germany) Max Wiskandt
April 20	Shymkent Challenger; Shymkent, Kazakhstan; Clay – Challenger 50 – 32S/24Q/16D; Singles – Doubles	(Germany) Max Hans Rehberg (Germany) Max Wiskandt; 6–1, 5–7, [10–6]	(United States) Dali Blanch; Svyatoslav Gulin	(France) Antoine Ghibaudo (Bosnia and Herzegovina) Andrej Nedić	Daniil Ostapenkov (Netherlands) Jelle Sels (United States) Dali Blanch (Germany) Max Wiskandt
April 27	Open Aix Provence; Aix-en-Provence, France; Clay – Challenger 175 – 28S/16Q/16D; Singles – Doubles	(Chile) Alejandro Tabilo; 6–4, 4–6, 6–3	(Belgium) Zizou Bergs	(Spain) Pol Martín Tiffon (United States) Ethan Quinn	(Belgium) Kimmer Coppejans (Australia) Rinky Hijikata (China) Wu Yibing (Peru) Ignacio Buse
April 27	Open Aix Provence; Aix-en-Provence, France; Clay – Challenger 175 – 28S/16Q/16D; Singles – Doubles	(United States) Robert Cash (United States) JJ Tracy; 5–7, 6–4, [10–4]	(United States) Vasil Kirkov (Netherlands) Bart Stevens	(Spain) Pol Martín Tiffon (United States) Ethan Quinn	(Belgium) Kimmer Coppejans (Australia) Rinky Hijikata (China) Wu Yibing (Peru) Ignacio Buse
April 27	Sardegna Open; Cagliari, Italy; Clay – Challenger 175 – 28S/16Q/16D; Singles – Doubles	(Italy) Matteo Arnaldi; 6–4, 6–4	(Poland) Hubert Hurkacz	(Argentina) Román Andrés Burruchaga (Italy) Gianluca Cadenasso	(Italy) Matteo Berrettini (United States) Marcos Giron (Portugal) Nuno Borges (Netherlands) Jesper de Jong
April 27	Sardegna Open; Cagliari, Italy; Clay – Challenger 175 – 28S/16Q/16D; Singles – Doubles	(Belgium) Sander Gillé (Netherlands) Sem Verbeek; 4–6, 6–3, [10–4]	(Czech Republic) Petr Nouza (Austria) Neil Oberleitner	(Argentina) Román Andrés Burruchaga (Italy) Gianluca Cadenasso	(Italy) Matteo Berrettini (United States) Marcos Giron (Portugal) Nuno Borges (Netherlands) Jesper de Jong
April 27	Upper Austria Open; Mauthausen, Austria; Clay – Challenger 100 – 32S/24Q/16D; Singles – Doubles	Roman Safiullin; 4–6, 6–4, 7–6^{(7–4)}	(Portugal) Jaime Faria	(United States) Darwin Blanch (Austria) Lukas Neumayer	(Spain) Miguel Damas (Czech Republic) Matthew William Donald (Serbia) Laslo Djere (Spain) David Jordà Sanchis
April 27	Upper Austria Open; Mauthausen, Austria; Clay – Challenger 100 – 32S/24Q/16D; Singles – Doubles	Ivan Liutarevich (Poland) Filip Pieczonka; 6–3, 3–6, [12–10]	(Spain) Àlex Martínez (Spain) Bruno Pujol Navarro	(United States) Darwin Blanch (Austria) Lukas Neumayer	(Spain) Miguel Damas (Czech Republic) Matthew William Donald (Serbia) Laslo Djere (Spain) David Jordà Sanchis
April 27	Jiujiang Challenger; Jiujiang, China; Hard – Challenger 75 – 32S/24Q/16D; Singles – Doubles	(Hong Kong) Coleman Wong; 7–5, 7–6^{(7–4)}	(Australia) Adam Walton	(Australia) Alex Bolt (China) Sun Fajing	(United States) Keegan Smith (Canada) Alexis Galarneau (China) Bu Yunchaokete (Estonia) Mark Lajal
April 27	Jiujiang Challenger; Jiujiang, China; Hard – Challenger 75 – 32S/24Q/16D; Singles – Doubles	(South Korea) Nam Ji-sung (Finland) Patrik Niklas-Salminen; 6–4, 6–4	(Chinese Taipei) Hsu Yu-hsiou (Japan) Seita Watanabe	(Australia) Alex Bolt (China) Sun Fajing	(United States) Keegan Smith (Canada) Alexis Galarneau (China) Bu Yunchaokete (Estonia) Mark Lajal
April 27	Ostra Group Open; Ostrava, Czech Republic; Clay – Challenger 75 – 32S/24Q/16D; Singles – Doubles	(Spain) Nikolás Sánchez Izquierdo; 6–4, 7–6^{(7–4)}	(Czech Republic) Zdeněk Kolář	(Germany) Tom Gentzsch (Italy) Raúl Brancaccio	(Czech Republic) Dalibor Svrčina (Germany) Rudolf Molleker (Italy) Marco Cecchinato (Bosnia and Herzegovina) Nerman Fatić
April 27	Ostra Group Open; Ostrava, Czech Republic; Clay – Challenger 75 – 32S/24Q/16D; Singles – Doubles	(Spain) Sergio Martos Gornés (Poland) Szymon Walków; 6–7^{(3–7)}, 7–5, [10–8]	(Poland) Karol Drzewiecki (Poland) Piotr Matuszewski	(Germany) Tom Gentzsch (Italy) Raúl Brancaccio	(Czech Republic) Dalibor Svrčina (Germany) Rudolf Molleker (Italy) Marco Cecchinato (Bosnia and Herzegovina) Nerman Fatić
April 27	Côte d'Ivoire Open II; Abidjan, Ivory Coast; Hard – Challenger 75 – 32S/24Q/16D; Singles – Doubles	(Belgium) Gauthier Onclin; 6–3, 6–4	(United States) Michael Mmoh	(Ivory Coast) Eliakim Coulibaly (Netherlands) Niels Visker	(Turkey) Mert Alkaya (United Kingdom) Hamish Stewart (France) Florent Bax (France) Calvin Hemery
April 27	Côte d'Ivoire Open II; Abidjan, Ivory Coast; Hard – Challenger 75 – 32S/24Q/16D; Singles – Doubles	(Denmark) Oskar Brostrøm Poulsen (United States) Billy Suarez; 7–6^{(7–0)}, 6–0	(France) Constantin Bittoun Kouzmine (Latvia) Robert Strombachs	(Ivory Coast) Eliakim Coulibaly (Netherlands) Niels Visker	(Turkey) Mert Alkaya (United Kingdom) Hamish Stewart (France) Florent Bax (France) Calvin Hemery
April 27	Shymkent Challenger II; Shymkent, Kazakhstan; Clay – Challenger 50 – 32S/24Q/16D; Singles – Doubles	(Belgium) Buvaysar Gadamauri; 7–6^{(8–6)}, 6–4	(India) Manas Dhamne	(Lithuania) Edas Butvilas (France) Antoine Ghibaudo	(Germany) Max Hans Rehberg (Croatia) Mili Poljičak (Bosnia and Herzegovina) Andrej Nedić (Italy) Alexander Binda
April 27	Shymkent Challenger II; Shymkent, Kazakhstan; Clay – Challenger 50 – 32S/24Q/16D; Singles – Doubles	(Croatia) Admir Kalender (Croatia) Mili Poljičak; 6–2, 6–7^{(7–9)}, [10–5]	(Norway) Viktor Durasovic (Germany) Kai Wehnelt	(Lithuania) Edas Butvilas (France) Antoine Ghibaudo	(Germany) Max Hans Rehberg (Croatia) Mili Poljičak (Bosnia and Herzegovina) Andrej Nedić (Italy) Alexander Binda

=== May ===
Week of	Tournament	Champions	Runners-up	Semifinalists	Quarterfinalists
May 4	Wuxi Open; Wuxi, China; Hard – Challenger 100 – 32S/24Q/16D; Singles – Doubles	(South Korea) Kwon Soon-woo; 6–2, 7–6^{(7–2)}	(China) Bu Yunchaokete	(China) Cui Jie (Estonia) Mark Lajal	(Australia) Adam Walton (Japan) Rio Noguchi (Australia) Dane Sweeny (Japan) Akira Santillan
May 4	Wuxi Open; Wuxi, China; Hard – Challenger 100 – 32S/24Q/16D; Singles – Doubles	(Netherlands) Jean-Julien Rojer (United States) Theodore Winegar; 6–3, 7–6^{(8–6)}	(South Korea) Nam Ji-sung (Finland) Patrik Niklas-Salminen	(China) Cui Jie (Estonia) Mark Lajal	(Australia) Adam Walton (Japan) Rio Noguchi (Australia) Dane Sweeny (Japan) Akira Santillan
May 4	Abruzzo Open; Francavilla al Mare, Italy; Clay – Challenger 75 – 32S/24Q/16D; Singles – Doubles	(Argentina) Facundo Díaz Acosta; 5–7, 6–1, 6–2	(Brazil) Gustavo Heide	(Denmark) August Holmgren (United States) Ryan Seggerman	(Czech Republic) Martin Krumich (Germany) Max Schönhaus (United Kingdom) Jay Clarke (Chinese Taipei) Tseng Chun-hsin
May 4	Abruzzo Open; Francavilla al Mare, Italy; Clay – Challenger 75 – 32S/24Q/16D; Singles – Doubles	(United States) Benjamin Kittay (United States) Ryan Seggerman; 6–4, 7–6^{(7–3)}	(France) Arthur Reymond (France) Luca Sanchez	(Denmark) August Holmgren (United States) Ryan Seggerman	(Czech Republic) Martin Krumich (Germany) Max Schönhaus (United Kingdom) Jay Clarke (Chinese Taipei) Tseng Chun-hsin
May 4	Brazzaville Challenger; Brazzaville, Republic of the Congo; Clay – Challenger 50 – 32S/24Q/16D; Singles – Doubles	(France) Calvin Hemery; 7–5, 3–6, 7–6^{(7–2)}	(France) Florent Bax	(Argentina) Franco Ribero (Spain) Iván Marrero Curbelo	(France) Mathys Erhard (Finland) Iiro Vasa (Jamaica) Blaise Bicknell (India) Karan Singh
May 4	Brazzaville Challenger; Brazzaville, Republic of the Congo; Clay – Challenger 50 – 32S/24Q/16D; Singles – Doubles	(Venezuela) Brandon Pérez (Argentina) Franco Ribero; 6–3, 6–4	(Belgium) Michael Geerts (Tunisia) Skander Mansouri	(Argentina) Franco Ribero (Spain) Iván Marrero Curbelo	(France) Mathys Erhard (Finland) Iiro Vasa (Jamaica) Blaise Bicknell (India) Karan Singh
May 4	Santos Brasil Tennis Cup; Santos, Brazil; Clay – Challenger 50 – 32S/24Q/16D; Singles – Doubles	(Uruguay) Franco Roncadelli; 6–3, 6–2	(Argentina) Hernán Casanova	(Brazil) Guto Miguel (Brazil) Matheus Pucinelli de Almeida	(Argentina) Lorenzo Joaquín Rodríguez (Bolivia) Murkel Dellien (Colombia) Miguel Tobón (Brazil) João Eduardo Schiessl
May 4	Santos Brasil Tennis Cup; Santos, Brazil; Clay – Challenger 50 – 32S/24Q/16D; Singles – Doubles	(Brazil) Guto Miguel (Brazil) Luís Felipe Miguel; 6–3, 6–4	(Brazil) Mateus Alves (Brazil) Pedro Sakamoto	(Brazil) Guto Miguel (Brazil) Matheus Pucinelli de Almeida	(Argentina) Lorenzo Joaquín Rodríguez (Bolivia) Murkel Dellien (Colombia) Miguel Tobón (Brazil) João Eduardo Schiessl
May 11	BNP Paribas Primrose Bordeaux; Bordeaux, France; Clay – Challenger 175 – 28S/16Q/16D; Singles – Doubles	(Argentina) Juan Manuel Cerúndolo; 5–7, 6–1, 7–6^{(7–4)}	(Belgium) Raphaël Collignon	(France) Quentin Halys (Netherlands) Tallon Griekspoor	(United States) Martin Damm (France) Giovanni Mpetshi Perricard (France) Titouan Droguet (Slovakia) Alex Molčan
May 11	BNP Paribas Primrose Bordeaux; Bordeaux, France; Clay – Challenger 175 – 28S/16Q/16D; Singles – Doubles	(Czech Republic) Petr Nouza (Austria) Neil Oberleitner; 7–6^{(7–3)}, 6–7^{(3–7)}, [10–6]	(France) Arthur Reymond (France) Luca Sanchez	(France) Quentin Halys (Netherlands) Tallon Griekspoor	(United States) Martin Damm (France) Giovanni Mpetshi Perricard (France) Titouan Droguet (Slovakia) Alex Molčan
May 11	Copa Faulconbridge; Valencia, Spain; Clay – Challenger 175 – 28S/16Q/16D; Singles – Doubles	(Serbia) Miomir Kecmanović; 6–2, 3–6, 6–2	(Paraguay) Daniel Vallejo	(Chile) Alejandro Tabilo (Spain) Jaume Munar	(Serbia) Dušan Lajović (Argentina) Camilo Ugo Carabelli (Belgium) Zizou Bergs (Spain) Pablo Carreño Busta
May 11	Copa Faulconbridge; Valencia, Spain; Clay – Challenger 175 – 28S/16Q/16D; Singles – Doubles	(Germany) Constantin Frantzen (Netherlands) Robin Haase; 6–4, 6–7^{(5–7)}, [11–9]	(Netherlands) Sander Arends (Netherlands) David Pel	(Chile) Alejandro Tabilo (Spain) Jaume Munar	(Serbia) Dušan Lajović (Argentina) Camilo Ugo Carabelli (Belgium) Zizou Bergs (Spain) Pablo Carreño Busta
May 11	Open de Oeiras II; Oeiras, Portugal; Clay – Challenger 100 – 32S/24Q/16D; Singles – Doubles	(Serbia) Laslo Djere; 6–3, 6–4	(United States) Emilio Nava	(Bolivia) Hugo Dellien (Portugal) Jaime Faria	(Lebanon) Benjamin Hassan (United States) Colton Smith (Czech Republic) Petr Brunclík (Chile) Tomás Barrios Vera
May 11	Open de Oeiras II; Oeiras, Portugal; Clay – Challenger 100 – 32S/24Q/16D; Singles – Doubles	(India) Siddhant Banthia (Bulgaria) Alexander Donski; 6–3, 6–2	(Portugal) Tiago Pereira (Spain) David Vega Hernández	(Bolivia) Hugo Dellien (Portugal) Jaime Faria	(Lebanon) Benjamin Hassan (United States) Colton Smith (Czech Republic) Petr Brunclík (Chile) Tomás Barrios Vera
May 11	Tunis Open; Tunis, Tunisia; Clay – Challenger 75 – 32S/24Q/16D; Singles – Doubles	(United States) Tristan Boyer; 6–1, 6–0	(United States) Dali Blanch	(Spain) Iñaki Montes de la Torre (Belgium) Kimmer Coppejans	(France) Laurent Lokoli (Italy) Federico Cinà (Belgium) Gilles-Arnaud Bailly (United Kingdom) Jay Clarke
May 11	Tunis Open; Tunis, Tunisia; Clay – Challenger 75 – 32S/24Q/16D; Singles – Doubles	(Spain) Sergio Martos Gornés (Poland) Szymon Walków; 1–6, 7–5, [10–8]	(Czech Republic) Hynek Bartoň (Czech Republic) Michael Vrbenský	(Spain) Iñaki Montes de la Torre (Belgium) Kimmer Coppejans	(France) Laurent Lokoli (Italy) Federico Cinà (Belgium) Gilles-Arnaud Bailly (United Kingdom) Jay Clarke
May 11	Zagreb Open; Zagreb, Croatia; Clay – Challenger 75 – 32S/24Q/16D; Singles – Doubles	(United Kingdom) Jan Choinski; 7–6^{(7–5)}, 7–6^{(7–2)}	(Hungary) Zsombor Piros	(United Kingdom) Arthur Fery (Denmark) Elmer Møller	(Luxembourg) Chris Rodesch (France) Yannick Theodor Alexandrescou (Ecuador) Andy Andrade (Austria) Lukas Neumayer
May 11	Zagreb Open; Zagreb, Croatia; Clay – Challenger 75 – 32S/24Q/16D; Singles – Doubles	(United Kingdom) Finn Bass (Bulgaria) Anthony Genov; 4–6, 6–3, [10–8]	(United States) George Goldhoff (Denmark) Johannes Ingildsen	(United Kingdom) Arthur Fery (Denmark) Elmer Møller	(Luxembourg) Chris Rodesch (France) Yannick Theodor Alexandrescou (Ecuador) Andy Andrade (Austria) Lukas Neumayer
May 11	Bengaluru Open II; Bengaluru, India; Hard – Challenger 50 – 32S/24Q/16D; Singles – Doubles	(United States) Keegan Smith; 6–2, 7–5	(Australia) Philip Sekulic	Ilya Ivashka (India) Kriish Tyagi	(Serbia) Ognjen Milić (India) Manish Sureshkumar (Thailand) Maximus Jones (United Kingdom) Hamish Stewart
May 11	Bengaluru Open II; Bengaluru, India; Hard – Challenger 50 – 32S/24Q/16D; Singles – Doubles	(India) Niki Kaliyanda Poonacha (India) Saketh Myneni; 6–2, 6–3	Petr Bar Biryukov (Kazakhstan) Grigoriy Lomakin	Ilya Ivashka (India) Kriish Tyagi	(Serbia) Ognjen Milić (India) Manish Sureshkumar (Thailand) Maximus Jones (United Kingdom) Hamish Stewart
May 11	Challenger Córdoba; Córdoba, Argentina; Clay – Challenger 50 – 32S/24Q/16D; Singles – Doubles	(Argentina) Juan Manuel La Serna; 7–5, 2–6, 6–3	(Uruguay) Franco Roncadelli	(Argentina) Guido Iván Justo (Argentina) Juan Bautista Torres	(Brazil) Eduardo Ribeiro (Argentina) Nicolás Kicker (Argentina) Valerio Aboian (Colombia) Miguel Tobón
May 11	Challenger Córdoba; Córdoba, Argentina; Clay – Challenger 50 – 32S/24Q/16D; Singles – Doubles	(Peru) Arklon Huertas del Pino (Peru) Conner Huertas del Pino; 6–3, 6–4	(Argentina) Ignacio Monzón (Chile) Nicolás Villalón	(Argentina) Guido Iván Justo (Argentina) Juan Bautista Torres	(Brazil) Eduardo Ribeiro (Argentina) Nicolás Kicker (Argentina) Valerio Aboian (Colombia) Miguel Tobón
May 18	Bosphorus Challenger Cup; Istanbul, Turkey; Clay – Challenger 75 – 32S/24Q/16D; Singles – Doubles	(Spain) David Jordà Sanchis; 6–4, 6–4	(Bosnia and Herzegovina) Andrej Nedić	(Italy) Franco Agamenone (Czech Republic) Hynek Bartoň	(Brazil) Thiago Monteiro (Croatia) Mili Poljičak (Poland) Daniel Michalski (Spain) Nikolás Sánchez Izquierdo
May 18	Bosphorus Challenger Cup; Istanbul, Turkey; Clay – Challenger 75 – 32S/24Q/16D; Singles – Doubles	(United States) George Goldhoff (United States) Theodore Winegar; 7–5, 6–2	(Czech Republic) Filip Duda (Serbia) Stefan Latinović	(Italy) Franco Agamenone (Czech Republic) Hynek Bartoň	(Brazil) Thiago Monteiro (Croatia) Mili Poljičak (Poland) Daniel Michalski (Spain) Nikolás Sánchez Izquierdo
May 18	Bengaluru Open III; Bengaluru, India; Hard – Challenger 50 – 32S/24Q/16D; Singles – Doubles	Petr Bar Biryukov; 7–6^{(7–0)}, 4–6, 6–4	Ilya Ivashka	(United Kingdom) Hamish Stewart (United Kingdom) Alastair Gray	(Mexico) Alex Hernández (Serbia) Ognjen Milić (Malaysia) Mitsuki Wei Kang Leong (India) Mukund Sasikumar
May 18	Bengaluru Open III; Bengaluru, India; Hard – Challenger 50 – 32S/24Q/16D; Singles – Doubles	(India) Adil Kalyanpur (India) Mukund Sasikumar; 6–7^{(3–7)}, 6–4, [10–3]	Petr Bar Biryukov (Kazakhstan) Grigoriy Lomakin	(United Kingdom) Hamish Stewart (United Kingdom) Alastair Gray	(Mexico) Alex Hernández (Serbia) Ognjen Milić (Malaysia) Mitsuki Wei Kang Leong (India) Mukund Sasikumar
May 18	Challenger Città di Cervia; Cervia, Italy; Clay – Challenger 50 – 32S/24Q/16D; Singles – Doubles	(Spain) Max Alcalá Gurri; 2–6, 6–1, 6–1	(Belgium) Buvaysar Gadamauri	(Italy) Andrea Guerrieri (Italy) Tommaso Compagnucci	(Italy) Carlo Alberto Caniato (Italy) Juan Cruz Martin Manzano (Bulgaria) Petr Nesterov (Italy) Enrico Dalla Valle
May 18	Challenger Città di Cervia; Cervia, Italy; Clay – Challenger 50 – 32S/24Q/16D; Singles – Doubles	(Italy) Francesco Forti (Italy) Filippo Romano; 6–3, 6–4	(Argentina) Santiago Rodríguez Taverna (Spain) David Vega Hernández	(Italy) Andrea Guerrieri (Italy) Tommaso Compagnucci	(Italy) Carlo Alberto Caniato (Italy) Juan Cruz Martin Manzano (Bulgaria) Petr Nesterov (Italy) Enrico Dalla Valle
May 25	Moldova Open; Chișinău, Moldova; Clay – Challenger 100 – 32S/24Q/16D; Singles – Doubles	(Greece) Stefanos Sakellaridis; 6–7^{(1–7)}, 6–3, 6–3	(Romania) Cezar Crețu	(Moldova) Radu Albot (Argentina) Genaro Alberto Olivieri	(Italy) Franco Agamenone (United Kingdom) Liam Broady (Italy) Luca Nardi (India) Sumit Nagal
May 25	Moldova Open; Chișinău, Moldova; Clay – Challenger 100 – 32S/24Q/16D; Singles – Doubles	(United States) George Goldhoff (United States) Theodore Winegar; 6–1, 6–4	(United States) Nathaniel Lammons (United States) Jackson Withrow	(Moldova) Radu Albot (Argentina) Genaro Alberto Olivieri	(Italy) Franco Agamenone (United Kingdom) Liam Broady (Italy) Luca Nardi (India) Sumit Nagal
May 25	Little Rock Challenger; Little Rock, United States; Hard – Challenger 75 – 32S/24Q/16D; Singles – Doubles	(United States) Colton Smith; 6–2, 6–4	(United States) Michael Mmoh	(United States) Andre Ilagan (Canada) Justin Boulais	(United States) Aidan Mayo (United States) Tyler Zink (Australia) Bernard Tomic (Japan) Jay Friend
May 25	Little Rock Challenger; Little Rock, United States; Hard – Challenger 75 – 32S/24Q/16D; Singles – Doubles	(United States) Pranav Kumar (United States) Karl Poling; 6–4, 6–1	(Australia) Eric Padgham (Czech Republic) Jakub Vrba	(United States) Andre Ilagan (Canada) Justin Boulais	(United States) Aidan Mayo (United States) Tyler Zink (Australia) Bernard Tomic (Japan) Jay Friend
May 25	Internazionali di Tennis Città di Vicenza; Vicenza, Italy; Clay – Challenger 75 – 32S/24Q/16D; Singles – Doubles	(Austria) Lukas Neumayer; 6–2, 6–2	(Italy) Jacopo Vasamì	(Italy) Stefano Travaglia (Chinese Taipei) Tseng Chun-hsin	(Germany) Diego Dedura (Chinese Taipei) Hsu Yu-hsiou (Spain) Pol Martín Tiffon (Switzerland) Rémy Bertola
May 25	Internazionali di Tennis Città di Vicenza; Vicenza, Italy; Clay – Challenger 75 – 32S/24Q/16D; Singles – Doubles	(Sweden) Erik Grevelius (Sweden) Adam Heinonen; 7–6^{(7–1)}, 7–6^{(7–5)}	(Switzerland) Rémy Bertola (Italy) Francesco Forti	(Italy) Stefano Travaglia (Chinese Taipei) Tseng Chun-hsin	(Germany) Diego Dedura (Chinese Taipei) Hsu Yu-hsiou (Spain) Pol Martín Tiffon (Switzerland) Rémy Bertola
May 25	Centurion Challenger; Centurion, South Africa; Hard – Challenger 50 – 32S/24Q/16D; Singles – Doubles	(United Kingdom) Giles Hussey; 6–3, 6–3	(Australia) Edward Winter	(Ivory Coast) Eliakim Coulibaly (Italy) Stefano Napolitano	Semen Pankin (Israel) Orel Kimhi (Latvia) Robert Strombachs (South Africa) Philip Henning
May 25	Centurion Challenger; Centurion, South Africa; Hard – Challenger 50 – 32S/24Q/16D; Singles – Doubles	(France) Constantin Bittoun Kouzmine (Latvia) Robert Strombachs; 6–4, 6–4	(Turkey) Mert Alkaya (Turkey) Arda Azkara	(Ivory Coast) Eliakim Coulibaly (Italy) Stefano Napolitano	Semen Pankin (Israel) Orel Kimhi (Latvia) Robert Strombachs (South Africa) Philip Henning
May 25	Košice Open; Košice, Slovakia; Clay – Challenger 50 – 32S/24Q/16D; Singles – Doubles	(Switzerland) Kilian Feldbausch; 6–0, 4–6, 6–4	(Czech Republic) Martin Krumich	(France) Mathys Erhard (United States) Dali Blanch	(Slovakia) Andrej Martin (Japan) Taro Daniel (Hungary) Péter Fajta (Czech Republic) Hynek Bartoň
May 25	Košice Open; Košice, Slovakia; Clay – Challenger 50 – 32S/24Q/16D; Singles – Doubles	(Slovakia) Miloš Karol (Croatia) Nino Serdarušić; 5–7, 7–6^{(7–4)}, [10–5]	(Slovakia) Lukáš Pokorný (Czech Republic) David Poljak	(France) Mathys Erhard (United States) Dali Blanch	(Slovakia) Andrej Martin (Japan) Taro Daniel (Hungary) Péter Fajta (Czech Republic) Hynek Bartoň

=== June ===
Week of	Tournament	Champions	Runners-up	Semifinalists	Quarterfinalists
June 1	Birmingham Open; Birmingham, United Kingdom; Grass – Challenger 125 – 32S/24Q/16D; Singles – Doubles	(China) Bu Yunchaokete; 2–6, 7–6^{(7–3)}, 6–3	(Finland) Otto Virtanen	(United Kingdom) Arthur Fery (Poland) Kamil Majchrzak	(Australia) Rinky Hijikata (Estonia) Mark Lajal (Italy) Filippo Romano (Japan) Sho Shimabukuro
June 1	Birmingham Open; Birmingham, United Kingdom; Grass – Challenger 125 – 32S/24Q/16D; Singles – Doubles	(United Kingdom) Ben Jones (United Kingdom) Joshua Paris; 6–4, 7–6^{(7–4)}	(India) Anirudh Chandrasekar (Japan) Takeru Yuzuki	(United Kingdom) Arthur Fery (Poland) Kamil Majchrzak	(Australia) Rinky Hijikata (Estonia) Mark Lajal (Italy) Filippo Romano (Japan) Sho Shimabukuro
June 1	Internazionali di Tennis Città di Perugia; Perugia, Italy; Clay – Challenger 125 – 32S/24Q/16D; Singles – Doubles	(Portugal) Henrique Rocha; 7–6^{(7–5)}, 6–3	(Spain) Daniel Mérida	(Kazakhstan) Timofey Skatov (Italy) Andrea Pellegrino	(Italy) Marco Cecchinato (Switzerland) Rémy Bertola (Spain) Pablo Llamas Ruiz (Italy) Pierluigi Basile
June 1	Internazionali di Tennis Città di Perugia; Perugia, Italy; Clay – Challenger 125 – 32S/24Q/16D; Singles – Doubles	(Belgium) Sander Gillé (Netherlands) Sem Verbeek; 7–6^{(7–3)}, 4–6, [10–6]	(United States) Ryan Seggerman (United States) Theodore Winegar	(Kazakhstan) Timofey Skatov (Italy) Andrea Pellegrino	(Italy) Marco Cecchinato (Switzerland) Rémy Bertola (Spain) Pablo Llamas Ruiz (Italy) Pierluigi Basile
June 1	Neckarcup 2.0; Bad Rappenau, Germany; Clay – Challenger 100 – 32S/24Q/16D; Singles – Doubles	(United States) Emilio Nava; Walkover	(Croatia) Luka Mikrut	(Germany) Diego Dedura (Germany) Henri Squire	(Argentina) Marco Trungelliti (Germany) Marvin Möller (Spain) Alejandro Moro Cañas (Netherlands) Guy den Ouden
June 1	Neckarcup 2.0; Bad Rappenau, Germany; Clay – Challenger 100 – 32S/24Q/16D; Singles – Doubles	(Chinese Taipei) Jason Jung (Japan) Kaito Uesugi; 7–6^{(7–4)}, 2–6, [12–10]	(Germany) Tim Rühl (Netherlands) Mick Veldheer	(Germany) Diego Dedura (Germany) Henri Squire	(Argentina) Marco Trungelliti (Germany) Marvin Möller (Spain) Alejandro Moro Cañas (Netherlands) Guy den Ouden
June 1	UniCredit Czech Open; Prostějov, Czech Republic; Clay – Challenger 100 – 32S/24Q/16D; Singles – Doubles	(Argentina) Sebastián Báez; 6–4, 6–2	(Slovakia) Alex Molčan	(Spain) Nikolás Sánchez Izquierdo (Czech Republic) Hynek Bartoň	(Czech Republic) Maxim Mrva (Argentina) Lautaro Midón (Japan) Taro Daniel (Ukraine) Vitaliy Sachko
June 1	UniCredit Czech Open; Prostějov, Czech Republic; Clay – Challenger 100 – 32S/24Q/16D; Singles – Doubles	(Slovakia) Miloš Karol (Czech Republic) Andrew Paulson; 6–3, 6–3	Ivan Liutarevich (Poland) Filip Pieczonka	(Spain) Nikolás Sánchez Izquierdo (Czech Republic) Hynek Bartoň	(Czech Republic) Maxim Mrva (Argentina) Lautaro Midón (Japan) Taro Daniel (Ukraine) Vitaliy Sachko
June 1	Tyler Tennis Championships; Tyler, United States; Hard – Challenger 75 – 32S/24Q/16D; Singles – Doubles	(Australia) Adam Walton; 7–5, 6–1	(United States) Andre Ilagan	(Canada) Liam Draxl (United States) Karl Poling	(France) Timo Legout (United States) Braden Shick (United Kingdom) Henry Searle (Japan) Yuta Shimizu
June 1	Tyler Tennis Championships; Tyler, United States; Hard – Challenger 75 – 32S/24Q/16D; Singles – Doubles	(India) Rithvik Choudary Bollipalli (India) Ramkumar Ramanathan; 7–6^{(7–2)}, 7–6^{(7–4)}	(United States) Zachary Fuchs (United States) Wally Thayne	(Canada) Liam Draxl (United States) Karl Poling	(France) Timo Legout (United States) Braden Shick (United Kingdom) Henry Searle (Japan) Yuta Shimizu
June 1	Centurion Challenger II; Centurion, South Africa; Hard – Challenger 50 – 32S/24Q/16D; Singles – Doubles	(South Africa) Philip Henning; 6–2, 3–6, 7–6^{(8–6)}	(Bulgaria) Alexander Donski	(France) Harold Mayot (South Africa) Khololwam Montsi	(Ivory Coast) Eliakim Coulibaly (United Kingdom) Giles Hussey (Turkey) Arda Azkara (Turkey) Tuncay Duran
June 1	Centurion Challenger II; Centurion, South Africa; Hard – Challenger 50 – 32S/24Q/16D; Singles – Doubles	(Turkey) Arda Azkara (Turkey) Tuncay Duran; 6–2, 6–7^{(4–7)}, [10–7]	(South Africa) Devin Badenhorst (South Africa) Luc Koenig	(France) Harold Mayot (South Africa) Khololwam Montsi	(Ivory Coast) Eliakim Coulibaly (United Kingdom) Giles Hussey (Turkey) Arda Azkara (Turkey) Tuncay Duran
June 8	Ilkley Open; Ilkley, United Kingdom; Grass – Challenger 125 – 32S/24Q/16D; Singles – Doubles	(China) Bu Yunchaokete; 6–3, 7–6^{(7–1)}	(United Kingdom) Jacob Fearnley	(Italy) Filippo Romano (Australia) Dane Sweeny	(United States) Darwin Blanch (United Kingdom) Oliver Tarvet (United Kingdom) Toby Samuel (Estonia) Mark Lajal
June 8	Ilkley Open; Ilkley, United Kingdom; Grass – Challenger 125 – 32S/24Q/16D; Singles – Doubles	(United Kingdom) David Stevenson (United Kingdom) Marcus Willis; 7–6^{(7–5)}, 6–3	(India) Rithvik Choudary Bollipalli (United States) Trey Hilderbrand	(Italy) Filippo Romano (Australia) Dane Sweeny	(United States) Darwin Blanch (United Kingdom) Oliver Tarvet (United Kingdom) Toby Samuel (Estonia) Mark Lajal
June 8	Bratislava Open; Bratislava, Slovakia; Clay – Challenger 100 – 32S/24Q/16D; Singles – Doubles	(Japan) Taro Daniel; 3–6, 6–0, 7–6^{(7–2)}	(Kazakhstan) Alexander Shevchenko	(Ukraine) Vitaliy Sachko (Italy) Federico Cinà	(Czech Republic) Maxim Mrva (Czech Republic) Petr Brunclík (Czech Republic) Zdeněk Kolář (Hungary) Zsombor Piros
June 8	Bratislava Open; Bratislava, Slovakia; Clay – Challenger 100 – 32S/24Q/16D; Singles – Doubles	(Poland) Karol Drzewiecki (Poland) Piotr Matuszewski; 6–4, 7–5	(Slovakia) Lukáš Pokorný (Ukraine) Vitaliy Sachko	(Ukraine) Vitaliy Sachko (Italy) Federico Cinà	(Czech Republic) Maxim Mrva (Czech Republic) Petr Brunclík (Czech Republic) Zdeněk Kolář (Hungary) Zsombor Piros
June 8	Open Sopra Steria de Lyon; Lyon, France; Clay – Challenger 100 – 32S/24Q/16D; Singles – Doubles	(Spain) David Jordà Sanchis; 6–4, 7–6^{(7–4)}	(France) Felix Balshaw	(Colombia) Daniel Elahi Galán (United States) Tristan Boyer	(Belgium) Kimmer Coppejans (France) Clément Tabur (United States) Dali Blanch (Spain) Nikolás Sánchez Izquierdo
June 8	Open Sopra Steria de Lyon; Lyon, France; Clay – Challenger 100 – 32S/24Q/16D; Singles – Doubles	(Thailand) Pruchya Isaro (India) Niki Kaliyanda Poonacha; 6–0, 6–1	(Tunisia) Skander Mansouri (Austria) Maximilian Neuchrist	(Colombia) Daniel Elahi Galán (United States) Tristan Boyer	(Belgium) Kimmer Coppejans (France) Clément Tabur (United States) Dali Blanch (Spain) Nikolás Sánchez Izquierdo
June 8	Cattolica Challenger; Cattolica, Italy; Clay – Challenger 75 – 32S/24Q/16D; Singles – Doubles	(Netherlands) Jesper de Jong; 6–3, 6–2	(Spain) Roberto Carballés Baena	(Italy) Enrico Dalla Valle (Italy) Francesco Forti	(Italy) Marco Cecchinato (Spain) Oriol Roca Batalla (Italy) Raúl Brancaccio (Italy) Andrea Guerrieri
June 8	Cattolica Challenger; Cattolica, Italy; Clay – Challenger 75 – 32S/24Q/16D; Singles – Doubles	(Romania) Alexandru Jecan (Romania) Bogdan Pavel; 7–6^{(12–10)}, 6–4	(Sweden) Erik Grevelius (Sweden) Adam Heinonen	(Italy) Enrico Dalla Valle (Italy) Francesco Forti	(Italy) Marco Cecchinato (Spain) Oriol Roca Batalla (Italy) Raúl Brancaccio (Italy) Andrea Guerrieri
June 8	Challenger Tucumán; San Miguel de Tucumán, Argentina; Clay – Challenger 50 – 32S/24Q/16D; Singles – Doubles	(Argentina) Luciano Emanuel Ambrogi; 6–2, 6–3	(Colombia) Johan Alexander Rodríguez	(Argentina) Guido Iván Justo (Argentina) Nicolás Kicker	(Argentina) Thiago Cigarrán (Argentina) Carlos María Zárate (Brazil) Matheus Pucinelli de Almeida (Argentina) Federico Coria
June 8	Challenger Tucumán; San Miguel de Tucumán, Argentina; Clay – Challenger 50 – 32S/24Q/16D; Singles – Doubles	(Argentina) Hernán Casanova (Argentina) Santiago Rodríguez Taverna; 3–6, 6–3, [10–7]	(Argentina) Mateo del Pino (United States) Ryan Dickerson	(Argentina) Guido Iván Justo (Argentina) Nicolás Kicker	(Argentina) Thiago Cigarrán (Argentina) Carlos María Zárate (Brazil) Matheus Pucinelli de Almeida (Argentina) Federico Coria
June 15	Nottingham Open; Nottingham, United Kingdom; Grass – Challenger 125 – 32S/24Q/16D; Singles – Doubles	(Australia) Christopher O'Connell; 7–6^{(7–3)}, 7–6^{(8–6)}	(Finland) Otto Virtanen	(China) Zhang Zhizhen (Switzerland) Rémy Bertola	Roman Safiullin (United Kingdom) Billy Harris (Japan) Shintaro Mochizuki (France) Benjamin Bonzi
June 15	Nottingham Open; Nottingham, United Kingdom; Grass – Challenger 125 – 32S/24Q/16D; Singles – Doubles	(Brazil) Fernando Romboli (United States) Theodore Winegar; 6–3, 6–4	(United States) Mac Kiger (United States) Reese Stalder	(China) Zhang Zhizhen (Switzerland) Rémy Bertola	Roman Safiullin (United Kingdom) Billy Harris (Japan) Shintaro Mochizuki (France) Benjamin Bonzi
June 15	Emilia-Romagna Open; Parma, Italy; Clay – Challenger 125 – 32S/24Q/16D; Singles – Doubles	(France) Luca Van Assche; 2–6, 6–2, 6–3	(Austria) Sebastian Ofner	(Serbia) Laslo Djere (Spain) Daniel Rincón	(Chinese Taipei) Tseng Chun-hsin (Spain) Roberto Carballés Baena (Belgium) Buvaysar Gadamauri (Italy) Marco Cecchinato
June 15	Emilia-Romagna Open; Parma, Italy; Clay – Challenger 125 – 32S/24Q/16D; Singles – Doubles	(Switzerland) Jakub Paul (United States) Ryan Seggerman; 6–2, 7–6^{(7–5)}	(Thailand) Pruchya Isaro (India) Niki Kaliyanda Poonacha	(Serbia) Laslo Djere (Spain) Daniel Rincón	(Chinese Taipei) Tseng Chun-hsin (Spain) Roberto Carballés Baena (Belgium) Buvaysar Gadamauri (Italy) Marco Cecchinato
June 15	Poznań Open; Poznań, Poland; Clay – Challenger 100 – 32S/24Q/16D; Singles – Doubles	(Brazil) Gustavo Heide; 6–2, 6–2	(Argentina) Facundo Díaz Acosta	(Italy) Michele Ribecai (Czech Republic) Dalibor Svrčina	(Brazil) João Lucas Reis da Silva (Germany) Florian Broska (Peru) Gonzalo Bueno (United Kingdom) Jan Choinski
June 15	Poznań Open; Poznań, Poland; Clay – Challenger 100 – 32S/24Q/16D; Singles – Doubles	(Spain) Sergio Martos Gornés (Poland) Szymon Walków; 6–3, 7–5	(Poland) Karol Drzewiecki (Poland) Piotr Matuszewski	(Italy) Michele Ribecai (Czech Republic) Dalibor Svrčina	(Brazil) João Lucas Reis da Silva (Germany) Florian Broska (Peru) Gonzalo Bueno (United Kingdom) Jan Choinski
June 15	Dublin Challenger; Dublin, Ireland; Grass – Challenger 75 – 32S/24Q/16D; Singles – Doubles	(United Kingdom) Henry Searle; 6–4, 6–2	(Austria) Jurij Rodionov	(France) Titouan Droguet (France) Kyrian Jacquet	(Greece) Stefanos Sakellaridis (China) Zhou Yi (Bulgaria) Grigor Dimitrov (Canada) Alexis Galarneau
June 15	Dublin Challenger; Dublin, Ireland; Grass – Challenger 75 – 32S/24Q/16D; Singles – Doubles	(Netherlands) Jarno Jans (Netherlands) Niels Visker; 6–4, 6–4	(United Kingdom) James MacKinlay (United Kingdom) Mark Whitehouse	(France) Titouan Droguet (France) Kyrian Jacquet	(Greece) Stefanos Sakellaridis (China) Zhou Yi (Bulgaria) Grigor Dimitrov (Canada) Alexis Galarneau
June 15	CIT Open; Asunción, Paraguay; Clay – Challenger 50 – 32S/24Q/16D; Singles – Doubles	(Dominican Republic) Nick Hardt; 7–6^{(7–0)}, 4–6, 6–2	(Argentina) Juan Estévez	(Argentina) Guido Iván Justo (Peru) Conner Huertas del Pino	(Argentina) Luciano Emanuel Ambrogi (Chile) Matías Soto (Argentina) Juan Manuel La Serna (Argentina) Gonzalo Villanueva
June 15	CIT Open; Asunción, Paraguay; Clay – Challenger 50 – 32S/24Q/16D; Singles – Doubles	(Uruguay) Joaquín Aguilar Cardozo (Argentina) Santiago de la Fuente; 7–6^{(7–4)}, 6–3	(Peru) Arklon Huertas del Pino (Peru) Conner Huertas del Pino	(Argentina) Guido Iván Justo (Peru) Conner Huertas del Pino	(Argentina) Luciano Emanuel Ambrogi (Chile) Matías Soto (Argentina) Juan Manuel La Serna (Argentina) Gonzalo Villanueva
June 15	Royan Atlantique Open; Royan, France; Clay – Challenger 50 – 32S/24Q/16D; Singles – Doubles	(Spain) Max Alcalá Gurri; 7–6^{(7–4)}, 6–1	(France) Cosme Rolland de Ravel	(Argentina) Lucio Ratti (Switzerland) Kilian Feldbausch	(France) Raphael Perot (South Korea) Gerard Campaña Lee (France) Leo Raquillet (Spain) Carlos Sánchez Jover
June 15	Royan Atlantique Open; Royan, France; Clay – Challenger 50 – 32S/24Q/16D; Singles – Doubles	(Netherlands) Daniel de Jonge (Germany) Jannik Opitz; 6–4, 6–4	(Spain) Ignasi Forcano (Netherlands) Mark Vervoort	(Argentina) Lucio Ratti (Switzerland) Kilian Feldbausch	(France) Raphael Perot (South Korea) Gerard Campaña Lee (France) Leo Raquillet (Spain) Carlos Sánchez Jover
June 22	INTARO Open; Târgu Mureș, Romania; Clay – Challenger 75 – 32S/24Q/16D; Singles – Doubles	(India) Sumit Nagal; 6–3, 7–5	(France) Felix Balshaw	(Bosnia and Herzegovina) Andrej Nedić (Romania) Cezar Crețu	(Czech Republic) Martin Krumich (Spain) Max Alcalá Gurri (Croatia) Duje Ajduković (Germany) Niels McDonald
June 22	INTARO Open; Târgu Mureș, Romania; Clay – Challenger 75 – 32S/24Q/16D; Singles – Doubles	(Netherlands) Thijmen Loof (Japan) Kaito Uesugi; 2–6, 7–6^{(7–0)}, [10–6]	(Serbia) Stefan Latinović (Czech Republic) Michael Vrbenský	(Bosnia and Herzegovina) Andrej Nedić (Romania) Cezar Crețu	(Czech Republic) Martin Krumich (Spain) Max Alcalá Gurri (Croatia) Duje Ajduković (Germany) Niels McDonald
June 22	Piracicaba Challenger; Piracicaba, Brazil; Clay – Challenger 50 – 32S/24Q/16D; Singles – Doubles	(Brazil) Thiago Seyboth Wild; 6–2, 6–2	(Argentina) Gonzalo Villanueva	(Brazil) Matheus Pucinelli de Almeida (Argentina) Juan Manuel La Serna	(Uruguay) Joaquín Aguilar Cardozo (Argentina) Valerio Aboian (Argentina) Nicolás Kicker (Dominican Republic) Nick Hardt
June 22	Piracicaba Challenger; Piracicaba, Brazil; Clay – Challenger 50 – 32S/24Q/16D; Singles – Doubles	(Brazil) Luís Felipe Miguel (Brazil) Paulo André Saraiva dos Santos; 6–3, 7–6^{(7–0)}	(Peru) Arklon Huertas del Pino (Peru) Conner Huertas del Pino	(Brazil) Matheus Pucinelli de Almeida (Argentina) Juan Manuel La Serna	(Uruguay) Joaquín Aguilar Cardozo (Argentina) Valerio Aboian (Argentina) Nicolás Kicker (Dominican Republic) Nick Hardt
June 22	Plovdiv Challenger; Plovdiv, Bulgaria; Clay – Challenger 50 – 32S/24Q/16D; Singles – Doubles	(Spain) Iñaki Montes de la Torre; 7–6^{(7–5)}, 3–6, 7–6^{(10–8)}	(Austria) Sandro Kopp	(Spain) Andrés Santamarta Roig (Bulgaria) Petr Nesterov	(Serbia) Ognjen Milić (Poland) Daniel Michalski (United States) Dali Blanch (Italy) Tommaso Compagnucci
June 22	Plovdiv Challenger; Plovdiv, Bulgaria; Clay – Challenger 50 – 32S/24Q/16D; Singles – Doubles	(Netherlands) Jarno Jans (Netherlands) Niels Visker; 6–4, 7–5	(Australia) Thomas Fancutt (New Zealand) Ajeet Rai	(Spain) Andrés Santamarta Roig (Bulgaria) Petr Nesterov	(Serbia) Ognjen Milić (Poland) Daniel Michalski (United States) Dali Blanch (Italy) Tommaso Compagnucci
June 29	Ion Țiriac Challenger; Brașov, Romania; Clay – Challenger 75 – 32S/24Q/16D; Singles – Doubles	(Hungary) Zsombor Piros; 6–4, 6–4	(United States) Keegan Smith	(Argentina) Guido Iván Justo (Poland) Maks Kaśnikowski	(Sweden) Olle Wallin (Bosnia and Herzegovina) Andrej Nedić (France) Sascha Gueymard Wayenburg (Bulgaria) Dimitar Kuzmanov
June 29	Ion Țiriac Challenger; Brașov, Romania; Clay – Challenger 75 – 32S/24Q/16D; Singles – Doubles	(Austria) Maximilian Neuchrist (Czech Republic) Michael Vrbenský; 6–3, 3–6, [10–4]	(Spain) Íñigo Cervantes (Ukraine) Denys Molchanov	(Argentina) Guido Iván Justo (Poland) Maks Kaśnikowski	(Sweden) Olle Wallin (Bosnia and Herzegovina) Andrej Nedić (France) Sascha Gueymard Wayenburg (Bulgaria) Dimitar Kuzmanov
June 29	Cary Tennis Classic; Cary, United States; Hard – Challenger 75 – 32S/24Q/16D; Singles – Doubles	(United States) Braden Shick; 4–6, 7–5, 6–3	(France) Timo Legout	(Australia) Edward Winter (Japan) Yosuke Watanuki	(United States) Ozan Baris (United States) William Manning (United States) Jack Kennedy (Japan) Jay Friend
June 29	Cary Tennis Classic; Cary, United States; Hard – Challenger 75 – 32S/24Q/16D; Singles – Doubles	(South Korea) Nam Ji-sung (Finland) Patrik Niklas-Salminen; 5–7, 7–5, [10–8]	(New Zealand) Finn Reynolds (New Zealand) James Watt	(Australia) Edward Winter (Japan) Yosuke Watanuki	(United States) Ozan Baris (United States) William Manning (United States) Jack Kennedy (Japan) Jay Friend
June 29	Aspria Tennis Cup; Milan, Italy; Clay – Challenger 75 – 32S/24Q/16D; Singles – Doubles	(Argentina) Facundo Díaz Acosta; 6–7^{(0–7)}, 7–6^{(7–5)}, 7–6^{(7–5)}	(Italy) Marco Cecchinato	(Spain) Daniel Rincón (Brazil) Gustavo Heide	(Argentina) Francisco Comesaña (Italy) Juan Cruz Martin Manzano (Italy) Enrico Dalla Valle (Italy) Pierluigi Basile
June 29	Aspria Tennis Cup; Milan, Italy; Clay – Challenger 75 – 32S/24Q/16D; Singles – Doubles	(Italy) Francesco Forti (Italy) Filippo Romano; 6–3, 7–6^{(7–5)}	(India) Siddhant Banthia (India) Arjun Kadhe	(Spain) Daniel Rincón (Brazil) Gustavo Heide	(Argentina) Francisco Comesaña (Italy) Juan Cruz Martin Manzano (Italy) Enrico Dalla Valle (Italy) Pierluigi Basile
June 29	Quito Challenger; Quito, Ecuador; Clay – Challenger 50 – 32S/24Q/16D; Singles – Doubles	(Brazil) Matheus Pucinelli de Almeida; 5–7, 6–3, 6–2	(Argentina) Hernán Casanova	(Colombia) Samuel Heredia (Brazil) Felipe Meligeni Alves	(Argentina) Ignacio Monzón (Mexico) Alan Magadán (Mexico) Rodrigo Pacheco Méndez (Colombia) Juan Sebastián Osorio
June 29	Quito Challenger; Quito, Ecuador; Clay – Challenger 50 – 32S/24Q/16D; Singles – Doubles	(Chile) Matías Soto (Bolivia) Federico Zeballos; 6–1, 6–4	(Argentina) Hernán Casanova (Brazil) Pedro Sakamoto	(Colombia) Samuel Heredia (Brazil) Felipe Meligeni Alves	(Argentina) Ignacio Monzón (Mexico) Alan Magadán (Mexico) Rodrigo Pacheco Méndez (Colombia) Juan Sebastián Osorio
June 29	Internationaux de Tennis de Troyes; Troyes, France; Clay – Challenger 50 – 32S/24Q/16D; Singles – Doubles	(Germany) Marvin Möller; 7–6^{(7–5)}, 6–3	(Switzerland) Kilian Feldbausch	(Italy) Lorenzo Giustino (France) Calvin Hemery	(Brazil) Igor Marcondes (Spain) Iñaki Montes de la Torre (Ivory Coast) Eliakim Coulibaly; Marat Sharipov
June 29	Internationaux de Tennis de Troyes; Troyes, France; Clay – Challenger 50 – 32S/24Q/16D; Singles – Doubles	(Netherlands) Mats Hermans (Brazil) Igor Marcondes; 6–3, 3–6, [10–7]	(Bulgaria) Anthony Genov (Germany) Kai Wehnelt	(Italy) Lorenzo Giustino (France) Calvin Hemery	(Brazil) Igor Marcondes (Spain) Iñaki Montes de la Torre (Ivory Coast) Eliakim Coulibaly; Marat Sharipov

=== July ===
Week of	Tournament	Champions	Runners-up	Semifinalists	Quarterfinalists
July 6	Brawo Open; Braunschweig, Germany; Clay – Challenger 125 – 32S/24Q/16D; Singles – Doubles	(United Kingdom) Jan Choinski; 4–6, 6–0, 6–4	(France) Hugo Gaston	(Spain) Daniel Rincón (Argentina) Facundo Díaz Acosta	(Serbia) Laslo Djere (Germany) Diego Dedura (Germany) Niels McDonald (Germany) Marvin Möller
July 6	Brawo Open; Braunschweig, Germany; Clay – Challenger 125 – 32S/24Q/16D; Singles – Doubles	(Brazil) Orlando Luz (Brazil) Rafael Matos; 7–5, 6–2	(France) Arthur Reymond (France) Luca Sanchez	(Spain) Daniel Rincón (Argentina) Facundo Díaz Acosta	(Serbia) Laslo Djere (Germany) Diego Dedura (Germany) Niels McDonald (Germany) Marvin Möller
July 6	Hall of Fame Open; Newport, United States; Grass – Challenger 125 – 32S/24Q/16D; Singles – Doubles	(United Kingdom) Jacob Fearnley; 5–7, 7–6^{(10–8)}, 6–4	(Australia) Adam Walton	(Canada) Alexis Galarneau (United States) Alex Michelsen	(United States) Daniel Milavsky (United States) Darwin Blanch (France) Arthur Géa (United Kingdom) Liam Broady
July 6	Hall of Fame Open; Newport, United States; Grass – Challenger 125 – 32S/24Q/16D; Singles – Doubles	(New Zealand) Finn Reynolds (New Zealand) James Watt; 6–1, 6–7^{(2–7)}, [10–6]	(Brazil) Fernando Romboli (Australia) John-Patrick Smith	(Canada) Alexis Galarneau (United States) Alex Michelsen	(United States) Daniel Milavsky (United States) Darwin Blanch (France) Arthur Géa (United Kingdom) Liam Broady
July 6	Iași Open; Iași, Romania; Clay – Challenger 100 – 32S/24Q/16D; Singles – Doubles	(Hungary) Zsombor Piros; 6–1, 7–6^{(7–2)}	(France) Titouan Droguet	(France) Valentin Royer (Switzerland) Jérôme Kym	(Japan) Taro Daniel (Brazil) Gustavo Heide (Argentina) Lautaro Midón (Poland) Maks Kaśnikowski
July 6	Iași Open; Iași, Romania; Clay – Challenger 100 – 32S/24Q/16D; Singles – Doubles	(Sweden) Erik Grevelius (Sweden) Adam Heinonen; 6–4, 6–2	(Serbia) Ivan Sabanov (Serbia) Matej Sabanov	(France) Valentin Royer (Switzerland) Jérôme Kym	(Japan) Taro Daniel (Brazil) Gustavo Heide (Argentina) Lautaro Midón (Poland) Maks Kaśnikowski
July 6	Open Bogotá; Bogotá, Colombia; Clay – Challenger 75 – 32S/24Q/16D; Singles – Doubles	(Colombia) Nicolás Mejía; 6–1, 7–5	(Chile) Matías Soto	(Peru) Juan Pablo Varillas (Italy) Lorenzo Claverie	(Argentina) Hernán Casanova (Brazil) Matheus Pucinelli de Almeida (Brazil) Lucas Andrade da Silva (Argentina) Facundo Mena
July 6	Open Bogotá; Bogotá, Colombia; Clay – Challenger 75 – 32S/24Q/16D; Singles – Doubles	(Chile) Matías Soto (Bolivia) Federico Zeballos; 6–4, 2–6, [11–9]	(Ecuador) Gonzalo Escobar (Argentina) Facundo Mena	(Peru) Juan Pablo Varillas (Italy) Lorenzo Claverie	(Argentina) Hernán Casanova (Brazil) Matheus Pucinelli de Almeida (Brazil) Lucas Andrade da Silva (Argentina) Facundo Mena
July 6	Internazionali di Tennis Città di Trieste; Trieste, Italy; Clay – Challenger 75 – 32S/24Q/16D; Singles – Doubles	(Bolivia) Hugo Dellien; 5–7, 6–4, 6–2	(Croatia) Matej Dodig	(Germany) Henri Squire (Switzerland) Henry Bernet	(Italy) Raúl Brancaccio (Austria) Lukas Neumayer (Italy) Federico Bondioli (Spain) Nikolás Sánchez Izquierdo
July 6	Internazionali di Tennis Città di Trieste; Trieste, Italy; Clay – Challenger 75 – 32S/24Q/16D; Singles – Doubles	(Croatia) Admir Kalender (Croatia) Nino Serdarušić; 7–6^{(7–4)}, 6–4	(Netherlands) Jarno Jans (United Kingdom) Mark Whitehouse	(Germany) Henri Squire (Switzerland) Henry Bernet	(Italy) Raúl Brancaccio (Austria) Lukas Neumayer (Italy) Federico Bondioli (Spain) Nikolás Sánchez Izquierdo
July 6	Ethias Province Open; Liège, Belgium; Clay – Challenger 50 – 32S/24Q/16D; Singles – Doubles	(Germany) Florian Broska; 6–7^{(4–7)}, 6–4, 6–1	(Italy) Lorenzo Giustino	(Belgium) Kimmer Coppejans (Spain) Miguel Damas	(France) Felix Balshaw (Netherlands) Guy den Ouden (Belgium) Jack Logé (India) Manas Dhamne
July 6	Ethias Province Open; Liège, Belgium; Clay – Challenger 50 – 32S/24Q/16D; Singles – Doubles	Sergey Betov (Chinese Taipei) Jeffrey Hsu; 7–6^{(7–3)}, 5–7, [13–11]	(Belgium) Émilien Demanet (Belgium) Niels Ratiu	(Belgium) Kimmer Coppejans (Spain) Miguel Damas	(France) Felix Balshaw (Netherlands) Guy den Ouden (Belgium) Jack Logé (India) Manas Dhamne
July 6	Lexus Nottingham Challenger II; Nottingham, United Kingdom; Grass – Challenger 50 – 32S/24Q/16D; Singles – Doubles	(United Kingdom) Henry Searle; 6–4, 6–4	(France) Clément Chidekh	(United Kingdom) Alastair Gray (United Kingdom) Max Basing	(Bulgaria) Ivan Ivanov (China) Zhou Yi (United Kingdom) Johannus Monday (United Kingdom) Felix Gill
July 6	Lexus Nottingham Challenger II; Nottingham, United Kingdom; Grass – Challenger 50 – 32S/24Q/16D; Singles – Doubles	(United Kingdom) Tom Hands (United Kingdom) Matthew Summers; 6–4, 4–6, [12–10]	(Turkey) Arda Azkara (Turkey) S Mert Özdemir	(United Kingdom) Alastair Gray (United Kingdom) Max Basing	(Bulgaria) Ivan Ivanov (China) Zhou Yi (United Kingdom) Johannus Monday (United Kingdom) Felix Gill
July 13	Dutch Open; Bunschoten, Netherlands; Clay – Challenger 75 – 32S/24Q/16D; Singles – Doubles	(Netherlands) Guy den Ouden; 6–4, 4–6, 6–0	(Germany) Tom Gentzsch	(Belgium) Kimmer Coppejans (Czech Republic) Jan Kumstát	(Netherlands) Ryan Nijboer (Colombia) Daniel Elahi Galán (Netherlands) Max Houkes (Netherlands) Thijs Boogaard
July 13	Dutch Open; Bunschoten, Netherlands; Clay – Challenger 75 – 32S/24Q/16D; Singles – Doubles	(Czech Republic) Andrew Paulson (Belgium) Joran Vliegen; 7–6^{(7–5)}, 6–2	(Romania) Victor Vlad Cornea (Israel) Daniel Cukierman	(Belgium) Kimmer Coppejans (Czech Republic) Jan Kumstát	(Netherlands) Ryan Nijboer (Colombia) Daniel Elahi Galán (Netherlands) Max Houkes (Netherlands) Thijs Boogaard
July 13	Internazionali di Tennis del Friuli Venezia Giulia; Cordenons, Italy; Clay – Challenger 75 – 32S/24Q/16D; Singles – Doubles	(Spain) Max Alcalá Gurri; 6–2, 6–0	(Italy) Federico Bondioli	(Hungary) Mátyás Füle (Argentina) Gonzalo Villanueva	(Bolivia) Hugo Dellien (India) Sumit Nagal (Uruguay) Franco Roncadelli (Italy) Stefano Napolitano
July 13	Internazionali di Tennis del Friuli Venezia Giulia; Cordenons, Italy; Clay – Challenger 75 – 32S/24Q/16D; Singles – Doubles	(Romania) Alexandru Jecan (Czech Republic) David Poljak; 4–6, 7–6^{(7–4)}, [10–3]	(Republic of Ireland) Charles Barry (Bulgaria) Anthony Genov	(Hungary) Mátyás Füle (Argentina) Gonzalo Villanueva	(Bolivia) Hugo Dellien (India) Sumit Nagal (Uruguay) Franco Roncadelli (Italy) Stefano Napolitano
July 13	Championnats Banque Nationale de Granby; Granby, Canada; Hard – Challenger 75 – 32S/24Q/16D; Singles – Doubles	(Australia) Aleksandar Vukic; 6–4, 1–6, 6–1	(France) Arthur Géa	(Denmark) August Holmgren (United States) Murphy Cassone	(Canada) Alexis Galarneau (Canada) Justin Boulais (Australia) Philip Sekulic (Canada) Liam Draxl
July 13	Championnats Banque Nationale de Granby; Granby, Canada; Hard – Challenger 75 – 32S/24Q/16D; Singles – Doubles	(New Zealand) Finn Reynolds (New Zealand) James Watt; 6–3, 6–4	(France) Guillaume Dalmasso (United States) Matt Kuhar	(Denmark) August Holmgren (United States) Murphy Cassone	(Canada) Alexis Galarneau (Canada) Justin Boulais (Australia) Philip Sekulic (Canada) Liam Draxl
July 13	Lincoln Challenger; Lincoln, United States; Hard – Challenger 75 – 32S/24Q/16D; Singles – Doubles	(Australia) Bernard Tomic; 4–6, 7–6^{(7–4)}, 7–6^{(7–3)}	(Estonia) Mark Lajal	(United States) Spencer Johnson (China) Bu Yunchaokete	(United States) Matthew Forbes (Hong Kong) Coleman Wong (Japan) Rio Noguchi (United States) Colton Smith
July 13	Lincoln Challenger; Lincoln, United States; Hard – Challenger 75 – 32S/24Q/16D; Singles – Doubles	(United States) Nathaniel Lammons (United States) Jackson Withrow; 6–3, 6–3	(United States) George Goldhoff (Canada) Cleeve Harper	(United States) Spencer Johnson (China) Bu Yunchaokete	(United States) Matthew Forbes (Hong Kong) Coleman Wong (Japan) Rio Noguchi (United States) Colton Smith
July 13	Open de Tenis Ciudad de Pozoblanco; Pozoblanco, Spain; Hard – Challenger 75 – 32S/24Q/16D; Singles – Doubles	(Luxembourg) Chris Rodesch; 6–4, 2–6, 7–6^{(7–5)}	Ilya Ivashka	(Japan) Akira Santillan (Portugal) Tiago Pereira	(United Kingdom) Oliver Crawford (Spain) Izan Almazán Valiente (Spain) Alejo Sánchez Quílez (France) Dan Added
July 13	Open de Tenis Ciudad de Pozoblanco; Pozoblanco, Spain; Hard – Challenger 75 – 32S/24Q/16D; Singles – Doubles	(Spain) Alejo Sánchez Quílez (Spain) Benjamín Winter López; 6–2, 7–5	(Turkey) Arda Azkara (Turkey) Yankı Erel	(Japan) Akira Santillan (Portugal) Tiago Pereira	(United Kingdom) Oliver Crawford (Spain) Izan Almazán Valiente (Spain) Alejo Sánchez Quílez (France) Dan Added
July 20	Zug Open; Zug, Switzerland; Clay – Challenger 125 – 32S/24Q/16D; Singles – Doubles	(Brazil) Thiago Seyboth Wild; 6–4, 6–3	(Switzerland) Marc-Andrea Hüsler	(Germany) Max Hans Rehberg (Switzerland) Dylan Dietrich	(United Kingdom) Anton Matusevich (Switzerland) Dominic Stricker (South Africa) Philip Henning (France) Harold Mayot
July 20	Zug Open; Zug, Switzerland; Clay – Challenger 125 – 32S/24Q/16D; Singles – Doubles	(Netherlands) Thijmen Loof (Japan) Kaito Uesugi; 6–4, 6–2	(Czech Republic) Andrew Paulson (Czech Republic) David Poljak	(Germany) Max Hans Rehberg (Switzerland) Dylan Dietrich	(United Kingdom) Anton Matusevich (Switzerland) Dominic Stricker (South Africa) Philip Henning (France) Harold Mayot
July 20	Cranbrook Tennis Classic; Bloomfield Hills, United States; Hard – Challenger 125 – 32S/24Q/16D; Singles – Doubles	(United States) Alex Michelsen; 7–6^{(7–4)}, 6–3	(United Kingdom) Jacob Fearnley	(India) Dhakshineswar Suresh (United States) Michael Zheng	(Estonia) Mark Lajal (United States) Andres Martin (United States) J. J. Wolf (Australia) Adam Walton
July 20	Cranbrook Tennis Classic; Bloomfield Hills, United States; Hard – Challenger 125 – 32S/24Q/16D; Singles – Doubles	(United States) Trey Hilderbrand (United States) JJ Tracy; 6–3, 7–6^{(7–2)}	(Thailand) Pruchya Isaro (India) Niki Kaliyanda Poonacha	(India) Dhakshineswar Suresh (United States) Michael Zheng	(Estonia) Mark Lajal (United States) Andres Martin (United States) J. J. Wolf (Australia) Adam Walton
July 20	Open Castilla y León; Segovia, Spain; Hard – Challenger 75 – 32S/24Q/16D; Singles – Doubles	(France) Luka Pavlovic; 6–4, 3–6, 6–1	(France) Matteo Martineau	(United Kingdom) Oliver Crawford (United States) Keegan Smith	(Turkey) Yankı Erel (Spain) Alejandro Moro Cañas (Turkey) Mert Alkaya (France) Paul Inchauspé
July 20	Open Castilla y León; Segovia, Spain; Hard – Challenger 75 – 32S/24Q/16D; Singles – Doubles	(Spain) Alejo Sánchez Quílez (Spain) Benjamín Winter López; 2–6, 7–6^{(7–2)}, [10–7]	(Turkey) Arda Azkara (Turkey) Yankı Erel	(United Kingdom) Oliver Crawford (United States) Keegan Smith	(Turkey) Yankı Erel (Spain) Alejandro Moro Cañas (Turkey) Mert Alkaya (France) Paul Inchauspé
July 20	Tampere Open; Tampere, Finland; Clay – Challenger 75 – 32S/24Q/16D; Singles – Doubles	(Germany) Diego Dedura; 6–3, 6–7^{(3–7)}, 6–3	(Finland) Otto Virtanen	(Belgium) Gauthier Onclin (Poland) Maks Kaśnikowski	(Brazil) Igor Marcondes (Germany) Tom Gentzsch (Czech Republic) Hynek Bartoň (Germany) Henri Squire
July 20	Tampere Open; Tampere, Finland; Clay – Challenger 75 – 32S/24Q/16D; Singles – Doubles	(Netherlands) Jarno Jans (Netherlands) Niels Visker; 6–2, 6–1	(France) Matt Ponchet (Denmark) Oskar Brostrøm Poulsen	(Belgium) Gauthier Onclin (Poland) Maks Kaśnikowski	(Brazil) Igor Marcondes (Germany) Tom Gentzsch (Czech Republic) Hynek Bartoň (Germany) Henri Squire
July 20	Winnipeg National Bank Challenger; Winnipeg, Canada; Hard – Challenger 75 – 32S/24Q/16D; Singles – Doubles	(United Kingdom) Toby Samuel; 6–4, 6–2	(Canada) Liam Draxl	(Japan) Shintaro Mochizuki (United Kingdom) Charles Broom	(United Kingdom) Johannus Monday (France) Clément Chidekh (Japan) Rio Noguchi (Chinese Taipei) Hsu Yu-hsiou
July 20	Winnipeg National Bank Challenger; Winnipeg, Canada; Hard – Challenger 75 – 32S/24Q/16D; Singles – Doubles	(United States) Daniel Milavsky (United States) Braden Shick; 6–3, 3–6, [10–7]	(United States) Joshua Sheehy (United States) Tyler Zink	(Japan) Shintaro Mochizuki (United Kingdom) Charles Broom	(United Kingdom) Johannus Monday (France) Clément Chidekh (Japan) Rio Noguchi (Chinese Taipei) Hsu Yu-hsiou
July 27	San Marino Open; San Marino, San Marino; Clay – Challenger 125 – 32S/24Q/16D; Singles – Doubles	(Argentina) Facundo Díaz Acosta; 6–1, 6–4	(Croatia) Mili Poljičak	(Lithuania) Vilius Gaubas (Peru) Juan Pablo Varillas	(Bolivia) Juan Carlos Prado Ángelo (Brazil) Thiago Monteiro (France) Alexandre Müller (Kazakhstan) Timofey Skatov
July 27	San Marino Open; San Marino, San Marino; Clay – Challenger 125 – 32S/24Q/16D; Singles – Doubles	(Serbia) Stefan Latinović (Croatia) Mili Poljičak; 7–6^{(7–5)}, 6–3	(France) Arthur Reymond (France) Luca Sanchez	(Lithuania) Vilius Gaubas (Peru) Juan Pablo Varillas	(Bolivia) Juan Carlos Prado Ángelo (Brazil) Thiago Monteiro (France) Alexandre Müller (Kazakhstan) Timofey Skatov
July 27	Odlum Brown Vancouver Open; Vancouver, Canada; Hard – Challenger 125 – 32S/24Q/16D; Singles – Doubles	(United States) J. J. Wolf; 7–5, 6–1	(Estonia) Mark Lajal	(Japan) Jay Friend (Canada) Keegan Rice	(France) Benjamin Bonzi (Japan) Hayato Matsuoka (United States) Daniel Milavsky (United States) Braden Shick
July 27	Odlum Brown Vancouver Open; Vancouver, Canada; Hard – Challenger 125 – 32S/24Q/16D; Singles – Doubles	(United States) Nathaniel Lammons (United States) Jackson Withrow; 7–6^{(9–7)}, 7–6^{(7–1)}	(United States) Daniel Milavsky (United States) Braden Shick	(Japan) Jay Friend (Canada) Keegan Rice	(France) Benjamin Bonzi (Japan) Hayato Matsuoka (United States) Daniel Milavsky (United States) Braden Shick
July 27	Bonn Open; Bonn, Germany; Clay – Challenger 75 – 32S/24Q/16D; Singles – Doubles	(United Kingdom) Jan Choinski; 6–3, 6–2	(Germany) Jamie Mackenzie	(Argentina) Federico Agustín Gómez (Sweden) Max Dahlin	(Sweden) Olle Wallin (Brazil) Matheus Pucinelli de Almeida (Austria) Jurij Rodionov (Colombia) Daniel Elahi Galán
July 27	Bonn Open; Bonn, Germany; Clay – Challenger 75 – 32S/24Q/16D; Singles – Doubles	(India) Vijay Sundar Prashanth (India) Ramkumar Ramanathan; 7–6^{(7–4)}, 6–3	(United Kingdom) Scott Duncan (Sweden) Adam Heinonen	(Argentina) Federico Agustín Gómez (Sweden) Max Dahlin	(Sweden) Olle Wallin (Brazil) Matheus Pucinelli de Almeida (Austria) Jurij Rodionov (Colombia) Daniel Elahi Galán
July 27	Svijany Open; Liberec, Czech Republic; Clay – Challenger 75 – 32S/24Q/16D; Singles – Doubles	(Czech Republic) Jan Kumstát; 6–3, 6–1	(Peru) Gonzalo Bueno	(India) Sumit Nagal (Slovakia) Norbert Gombos	(Portugal) Frederico Ferreira Silva (Czech Republic) Martin Krumich (Switzerland) Kilian Feldbausch (Argentina) Juan Bautista Torres
July 27	Svijany Open; Liberec, Czech Republic; Clay – Challenger 75 – 32S/24Q/16D; Singles – Doubles	(Spain) Íñigo Cervantes (Ukraine) Denys Molchanov; 7–6^{(9–7)}, 6–3	(Austria) Maximilian Neuchrist (Czech Republic) David Poljak	(India) Sumit Nagal (Slovakia) Norbert Gombos	(Portugal) Frederico Ferreira Silva (Czech Republic) Martin Krumich (Switzerland) Kilian Feldbausch (Argentina) Juan Bautista Torres
July 27	Samsun Open; Samsun, Turkey; Hard – Challenger 50 – 32S/24Q/16D; Singles – Doubles	(France) Gabriel Debru; 3–6, 7–5, 6–4	(France) Constantin Bittoun Kouzmine	(Japan) Kenta Miyoshi (France) Paul Inchauspé	(Ukraine) Vadym Ursu (India) Manas Dhamne (Turkey) Yankı Erel (Japan) Koki Matsuda
July 27	Samsun Open; Samsun, Turkey; Hard – Challenger 50 – 32S/24Q/16D; Singles – Doubles	(United States) Christopher Papa (China) Zheng Baoluo; 6–4, 6–7^{(2–7)}, [13–11]	(France) Dan Added (France) Gabriel Debru	(Japan) Kenta Miyoshi (France) Paul Inchauspé	(Ukraine) Vadym Ursu (India) Manas Dhamne (Turkey) Yankı Erel (Japan) Koki Matsuda

=== August ===
Week of	Tournament	Champions	Runners-up	Semifinalists	Quarterfinalists
August 3	Platzmann Open; Hagen, Germany; Clay – Challenger 100 – 32S/24Q/16D; Singles – Doubles	(Germany) Tom Gentzsch; 6–4, 7–6^{(7–4)}	(Switzerland) Jérôme Kym	(Hungary) Zsombor Piros (Denmark) Elmer Møller	(Germany) Henri Squire (Netherlands) Guy den Ouden (Italy) Lorenzo Giustino (Spain) Carlos Taberner
August 3	Platzmann Open; Hagen, Germany; Clay – Challenger 100 – 32S/24Q/16D; Singles – Doubles	(Croatia) Admir Kalender (Croatia) Nino Serdarušić; 6–4, 3–6, [13–11]	(United Kingdom) Finn Bass (Netherlands) Jarno Jans	(Hungary) Zsombor Piros (Denmark) Elmer Møller	(Germany) Henri Squire (Netherlands) Guy den Ouden (Italy) Lorenzo Giustino (Spain) Carlos Taberner
August 3	Mazovia Open; Grodzisk Mazowiecki, Poland; Hard – Challenger 75 – 32S/24Q/16D; Singles – Doubles	(Austria) Joel Schwärzler; 7–6^{(7–4)}, 6–1	(Italy) Andrea Guerrieri	(France) Mathys Erhard (Estonia) Daniil Glinka	(Spain) Iván Marrero Curbelo; Ilya Ivashka (Italy) Michele Ribecai (Bulgaria) Alexander Donski
August 3	Mazovia Open; Grodzisk Mazowiecki, Poland; Hard – Challenger 75 – 32S/24Q/16D; Singles – Doubles	(Morocco) Younes Lalami (Poland) Filip Pieczonka; 6–0, 6–4	(Spain) Íñigo Cervantes (Ukraine) Denys Molchanov	(France) Mathys Erhard (Estonia) Daniil Glinka	(Spain) Iván Marrero Curbelo; Ilya Ivashka (Italy) Michele Ribecai (Bulgaria) Alexander Donski
August 3	Lexington Open; Lexington, United States; Hard – Challenger 75 – 32S/24Q/16D; Singles – Doubles	(Lithuania) Edas Butvilas; 6–2, 1–6, 7–6^{(8–6)}	(United States) Andre Ilagan	(United States) Spencer Johnson (Serbia) Dušan Lajović	(United States) Andres Martin (United States) Sebastian Gorzny (Japan) Rei Sakamoto (Jordan) Abdullah Shelbayh
August 3	Lexington Open; Lexington, United States; Hard – Challenger 75 – 32S/24Q/16D; Singles – Doubles	(Ecuador) Gonzalo Escobar (India) Niki Kaliyanda Poonacha; 6–7^{(1–7)}, 6–3, [11–9]	(United States) Andre Ilagan (United States) Karl Poling	(United States) Spencer Johnson (Serbia) Dušan Lajović	(United States) Andres Martin (United States) Sebastian Gorzny (Japan) Rei Sakamoto (Jordan) Abdullah Shelbayh
August 3	ENKA Open; Istanbul, Turkey; Hard – Challenger 50 – 32S/24Q/16D; Singles – Doubles	(France) Lucas Poullain; 5–7, 6–2, 6–3	Ilia Simakin	(Netherlands) Gijs Brouwer (France) Antoine Ghibaudo	(Japan) Kenta Miyoshi (Japan) Koki Matsuda (United Kingdom) Max Basing (France) Florent Bax
August 3	ENKA Open; Istanbul, Turkey; Hard – Challenger 50 – 32S/24Q/16D; Singles – Doubles	(Turkey) Arda Azkara (United Kingdom) James MacKinlay; 6–3, 6–1	Sergey Betov; Ilia Simakin	(Netherlands) Gijs Brouwer (France) Antoine Ghibaudo	(Japan) Kenta Miyoshi (Japan) Koki Matsuda (United Kingdom) Max Basing (France) Florent Bax
August 3	Plovdiv Challenger II; Plovdiv, Bulgaria; Clay – Challenger 50 – 32S/24Q/16D; Singles – Doubles	(Italy) Gabriele Piraino; 6–1, 7–6^{(7–5)}	(Bulgaria) Petr Nesterov	(Spain) Carlos Sánchez Jover (Romania) Radu Mihai Papoe	(South Korea) Gerard Campaña Lee (Bulgaria) George Lazarov (Bulgaria) Adrian Andreev (France) Yannick Theodor Alexandrescou
August 3	Plovdiv Challenger II; Plovdiv, Bulgaria; Clay – Challenger 50 – 32S/24Q/16D; Singles – Doubles	(Brazil) João Victor Couto Loureiro (Brazil) Eduardo Ribeiro; 6–4, 6–2	(Serbia) Tadija Radovanović (France) Cosme Rolland de Ravel	(Spain) Carlos Sánchez Jover (Romania) Radu Mihai Papoe	(South Korea) Gerard Campaña Lee (Bulgaria) George Lazarov (Bulgaria) Adrian Andreev (France) Yannick Theodor Alexandrescou
August 10	Indiana Hardcourt Championships; Brownsburg, United States; Hard – Challenger 75 – 32S/24Q/16D; Singles – Doubles	(South Africa) Lloyd Harris; 6–2, 7–6^{(8–6)}	(United States) Andre Ilagan	(United Kingdom) Jack Pinnington Jones (United States) Daniel Milavsky	(Australia) Tristan Schoolkate (Ecuador) Andy Andrade (Japan) Rei Sakamoto (United Kingdom) Harry Wendelken
August 10	Indiana Hardcourt Championships; Brownsburg, United States; Hard – Challenger 75 – 32S/24Q/16D; Singles – Doubles	(Ecuador) Gonzalo Escobar (India) Niki Kaliyanda Poonacha; 6–4, 6–1	(United States) Robert Cash (Netherlands) Bart Stevens	(United Kingdom) Jack Pinnington Jones (United States) Daniel Milavsky	(Australia) Tristan Schoolkate (Ecuador) Andy Andrade (Japan) Rei Sakamoto (United Kingdom) Harry Wendelken
August 10	Hamburg Ladies & Gents Cup; Hamburg, Germany; Clay – Challenger 75 – 32S/24Q/16D; Singles – Doubles	(Czech Republic) Jan Kumstát; 4–6, 7–6^{(7–5)}, 7–5	(Germany) Marvin Möller	(Brazil) Matheus Pucinelli de Almeida (Croatia) Matej Dodig	(Switzerland) Dylan Dietrich (Spain) Carlos Taberner (Georgia (country)) Saba Purtseladze (Germany) Niels McDonald
August 10	Hamburg Ladies & Gents Cup; Hamburg, Germany; Clay – Challenger 75 – 32S/24Q/16D; Singles – Doubles	(Croatia) Admir Kalender (Croatia) Nino Serdarušić; 6–3, 6–4	(Germany) Niels McDonald (Germany) Jannik Opitz	(Brazil) Matheus Pucinelli de Almeida (Croatia) Matej Dodig	(Switzerland) Dylan Dietrich (Spain) Carlos Taberner (Georgia (country)) Saba Purtseladze (Germany) Niels McDonald
August 10	Internazionali di Tennis Città di Todi; Todi, Italy; Clay – Challenger 75 – 32S/24Q/16D; Singles – Doubles	(Czech Republic) Maxim Mrva; 6–2, 6–2	(Argentina) Nicolás Kicker	(Italy) Marco Cecchinato (Argentina) Alex Barrena	(Italy) Francesco Passaro (Argentina) Juan Bautista Torres (Argentina) Federico Agustín Gómez (Austria) Lukas Neumayer
August 10	Internazionali di Tennis Città di Todi; Todi, Italy; Clay – Challenger 75 – 32S/24Q/16D; Singles – Doubles	(France) Arthur Reymond (France) Luca Sanchez; 6–2, 6–4	(Spain) Mario Mansilla Díez (Spain) Benjamín Winter López	(Italy) Marco Cecchinato (Argentina) Alex Barrena	(Italy) Francesco Passaro (Argentina) Juan Bautista Torres (Argentina) Federico Agustín Gómez (Austria) Lukas Neumayer
August 10	President's Cup; Astana, Kazakhstan; Hard – Challenger 50 – 32S/24Q/16D; Singles – Doubles	(Japan) Hayato Matsuoka; 0–6, 6–1, 7–6^{(7–5)}	(Tunisia) Aziz Dougaz	(Uzbekistan) Sergey Fomin (Uzbekistan) Khumoyun Sultanov	(China) Cui Jie (Japan) Masamichi Imamura (China) Sun Fajing (Turkey) Mert Alkaya
August 10	President's Cup; Astana, Kazakhstan; Hard – Challenger 50 – 32S/24Q/16D; Singles – Doubles	(Japan) Taisei Ichikawa (Japan) Masamichi Imamura; 3–6, 7–6^{(7–4)}, [10–5]	Petr Bar Biryukov (Kazakhstan) Grigoriy Lomakin	(Uzbekistan) Sergey Fomin (Uzbekistan) Khumoyun Sultanov	(China) Cui Jie (Japan) Masamichi Imamura (China) Sun Fajing (Turkey) Mert Alkaya
August 17 (Note: The Advantage Cars Prague Open was originally due to take place 4–10 May but was rescheduled due to renovations at the site for the 2026 Prague Open.)	Cancún Country Open; Cancún, Mexico; Hard – Challenger 125 – 28S/16Q/16D; Singles – Doubles	(Poland) Hubert Hurkacz; 4–6, 6–0, 6–3	(Argentina) Sebastián Báez	(South Africa) Lloyd Harris (Tunisia) Moez Echargui	(Hong Kong) Coleman Wong (Czech Republic) Vít Kopřiva; Roman Safiullin (France) Moïse Kouamé
August 17	Cancún Country Open; Cancún, Mexico; Hard – Challenger 125 – 28S/16Q/16D; Singles – Doubles	(India) Sriram Balaji (India) Anirudh Chandrasekar; 6–3, 7–6^{(7–4)}	Ivan Liutarevich (Mexico) Miguel Ángel Reyes-Varela	(South Africa) Lloyd Harris (Tunisia) Moez Echargui	(Hong Kong) Coleman Wong (Czech Republic) Vít Kopřiva; Roman Safiullin (France) Moïse Kouamé
August 17	Challenger Banque Nationale de Québec; Quebec City, Canada; Hard – Challenger 125 – 28S/16Q/16D; Singles – Doubles	(France) Luca Van Assche; 6–1, 6–4	(Greece) Stefanos Sakellaridis	(Japan) Taro Daniel (France) Hugo Gaston	(Belgium) Zizou Bergs (United Kingdom) Jacob Fearnley (Netherlands) Jesper de Jong (France) Benjamin Bonzi
August 17	Challenger Banque Nationale de Québec; Quebec City, Canada; Hard – Challenger 125 – 28S/16Q/16D; Singles – Doubles	(Bulgaria) Alexander Donski (New Zealand) Ajeet Rai; 6–3, 4–6, [10–3]	(Canada) Justin Boulais (Canada) Duncan Chan	(Japan) Taro Daniel (France) Hugo Gaston	(Belgium) Zizou Bergs (United Kingdom) Jacob Fearnley (Netherlands) Jesper de Jong (France) Benjamin Bonzi
August 17	Kingston Open; Kingston, Jamaica; Hard – Challenger 75 – 32S/24Q/16D; Singles – Doubles	(France) Valentin Royer; 6–4, 6–2	(Spain) Pedro Martínez	(France) Clément Chidekh (Estonia) Daniil Glinka	(Peru) Gonzalo Bueno (Argentina) Lautaro Midón (Bolivia) Juan Carlos Prado Ángelo (France) Harold Mayot
August 17	Kingston Open; Kingston, Jamaica; Hard – Challenger 75 – 32S/24Q/16D; Singles – Doubles	(France) Arthur Reymond (France) Luca Sanchez; 6–4, 2–6, [12–10]	(Slovenia) Blaž Kavčič (Australia) Max Purcell	(France) Clément Chidekh (Estonia) Daniil Glinka	(Peru) Gonzalo Bueno (Argentina) Lautaro Midón (Bolivia) Juan Carlos Prado Ángelo (France) Harold Mayot
August 17	Advantage Cars Prague Open; Prague, Czech Republic; Clay – Challenger 75 – 32S/24Q/16D; Singles – Doubles	(Czech Republic) Jan Kumstát; 5–7, 6–3, 6–0	(Chinese Taipei) Tseng Chun-hsin	(Slovakia) Norbert Gombos (Romania) Filip Cristian Jianu	(Ukraine) Oleksii Krutykh (Romania) Radu Mihai Papoe (Czech Republic) Maxim Mrva (Germany) Max Hans Rehberg
August 17	Advantage Cars Prague Open; Prague, Czech Republic; Clay – Challenger 75 – 32S/24Q/16D; Singles – Doubles	(Czech Republic) Andrew Paulson (Belgium) Joran Vliegen; 6–4, 6–3	(Sweden) Erik Grevelius (Sweden) Adam Heinonen	(Slovakia) Norbert Gombos (Romania) Filip Cristian Jianu	(Ukraine) Oleksii Krutykh (Romania) Radu Mihai Papoe (Czech Republic) Maxim Mrva (Germany) Max Hans Rehberg
August 17	Roehampton Challenger; Roehampton, United Kingdom; Hard – Challenger 50 – 32S/24Q/16D; Singles – Doubles	(United Kingdom) Oliver Tarvet; 6–3, 6–2	(France) Lucas Poullain	(United Kingdom) Anton Matusevich (United Kingdom) Lui Maxted	(United Kingdom) Mark Ceban (United Kingdom) Charles Broom (Romania) Adrian Boitan (Belgium) Michael Geerts
August 17	Roehampton Challenger; Roehampton, United Kingdom; Hard – Challenger 50 – 32S/24Q/16D; Singles – Doubles	(United Kingdom) Tom Hands (United Kingdom) Matthew Summers; 6–2, 7–6^{(8–6)}	(United States) Alafia Ayeni (France) Lucas Poullain	(United Kingdom) Anton Matusevich (United Kingdom) Lui Maxted	(United Kingdom) Mark Ceban (United Kingdom) Charles Broom (Romania) Adrian Boitan (Belgium) Michael Geerts
August 17	Open de Sion; Sion, Switzerland; Clay – Challenger 50 – 32S/24Q/16D; Singles – Doubles	(Switzerland) Dominic Stricker; 6–1, 2–6, 6–2	(Lebanon) Benjamin Hassan	(Italy) Lorenzo Giustino (Italy) Tommaso Compagnucci	(Bulgaria) Dimitar Kuzmanov (France) Geoffrey Blancaneaux (Switzerland) Mika Brunold (Argentina) Juan Manuel La Serna
August 17	Open de Sion; Sion, Switzerland; Clay – Challenger 50 – 32S/24Q/16D; Singles – Doubles	(Austria) Maximilian Neuchrist (Czech Republic) David Poljak; 6–4, 6–4	(Bolivia) Murkel Dellien (Argentina) Facundo Mena	(Italy) Lorenzo Giustino (Italy) Tommaso Compagnucci	(Bulgaria) Dimitar Kuzmanov (France) Geoffrey Blancaneaux (Switzerland) Mika Brunold (Argentina) Juan Manuel La Serna
August 24	Kingston Open II; Kingston, Jamaica; Hard – Challenger 75 – 32S/24Q/16D; Singles – Doubles	(United States) Aidan Mayo; 6–3, 7–6^{(9–7)}	(Ecuador) Andy Andrade	(Brazil) Guto Miguel (Mexico) Rodrigo Pacheco Méndez	(United States) Andres Martin (United States) Andrew Fenty (Colombia) Miguel Tobón (Australia) Max Purcell
August 24	Kingston Open II; Kingston, Jamaica; Hard – Challenger 75 – 32S/24Q/16D; Singles – Doubles	(France) Arthur Reymond (France) Luca Sanchez; 6–2, 6–4	(Bulgaria) Alexander Donski (Canada) Dan Martin	(Brazil) Guto Miguel (Mexico) Rodrigo Pacheco Méndez	(United States) Andres Martin (United States) Andrew Fenty (Colombia) Miguel Tobón (Australia) Max Purcell
August 24	Schwaben Open; Augsburg, Germany; Clay – Challenger 50 – 32S/24Q/16D; Singles – Doubles	(Romania) Cezar Crețu; 6–2, 6–0	(Argentina) Facundo Mena	(Germany) Benito Sanchez Martinez (Austria) Sandro Kopp	(Czech Republic) Hynek Bartoň (Germany) Daniel Masur (Germany) Marvin Möller (Czech Republic) Martin Krumich
August 24	Schwaben Open; Augsburg, Germany; Clay – Challenger 50 – 32S/24Q/16D; Singles – Doubles	(Czech Republic) Dominik Reček (Czech Republic) Daniel Siniakov; 6–2, 6–3	(Argentina) Juan Manuel La Serna (Brazil) Eduardo Ribeiro	(Germany) Benito Sanchez Martinez (Austria) Sandro Kopp	(Czech Republic) Hynek Bartoň (Germany) Daniel Masur (Germany) Marvin Möller (Czech Republic) Martin Krumich
August 24	Roehampton Challenger II; Roehampton, United Kingdom; Hard – Challenger 50 – 32S/24Q/16D; Singles – Doubles	(United Kingdom) George Loffhagen; 7–5, 6–3	(United Kingdom) Charles Broom	(United Kingdom) Oliver Tarvet (Italy) Michele Ribecai	(United Kingdom) Max Basing (United Kingdom) Emile Hudd (Spain) Iñaki Montes de la Torre (United Kingdom) Johannus Monday
August 24	Roehampton Challenger II; Roehampton, United Kingdom; Hard – Challenger 50 – 32S/24Q/16D; Singles – Doubles	(United Kingdom) Tom Hands (United Kingdom) Matthew Summers; 6–4, 6–3	(United Kingdom) Alastair Gray (United States) Alex Rybakov	(United Kingdom) Oliver Tarvet (Italy) Michele Ribecai	(United Kingdom) Max Basing (United Kingdom) Emile Hudd (Spain) Iñaki Montes de la Torre (United Kingdom) Johannus Monday
August 31	Como Lake Challenger; Como, Italy; Clay – Challenger 75 – 32S/24Q/16D; Singles – Doubles	(Croatia) Matej Dodig; 6–3, 7–6^{(7–5)}	(Peru) Juan Pablo Varillas	(Switzerland) Johan Nikles (United Kingdom) Jay Clarke	(Bosnia and Herzegovina) Andrej Nedić (Germany) Max Schönhaus (Brazil) Thiago Seyboth Wild (Croatia) Duje Ajduković
August 31	Como Lake Challenger; Como, Italy; Clay – Challenger 75 – 32S/24Q/16D; Singles – Doubles	(Croatia) Admir Kalender (Croatia) Nino Serdarušić; 6–3, 6–4	(Poland) Karol Drzewiecki (Poland) Piotr Matuszewski	(Switzerland) Johan Nikles (United Kingdom) Jay Clarke	(Bosnia and Herzegovina) Andrej Nedić (Germany) Max Schönhaus (Brazil) Thiago Seyboth Wild (Croatia) Duje Ajduković
August 31	Rafa Nadal Open; Manacor, Spain; Hard – Challenger 75 – 32S/24Q/16D; Singles – Doubles	(France) Felix Balshaw; 3–6, 6–2, 6–3	(Spain) Iñaki Montes de la Torre	(Italy) Luca Potenza (Estonia) Mark Lajal	(Lithuania) Edas Butvilas (United Kingdom) Jack Pinnington Jones (Spain) Alejo Sánchez Quílez (United Kingdom) Billy Harris
August 31	Rafa Nadal Open; Manacor, Spain; Hard – Challenger 75 – 32S/24Q/16D; Singles – Doubles	(Spain) Alberto Barroso Campos (Spain) David Vega Hernández; 7–5, 7–6^{(7–5)}	(Denmark) Johannes Ingildsen (Denmark) Oskar Brostrøm Poulsen	(Italy) Luca Potenza (Estonia) Mark Lajal	(Lithuania) Edas Butvilas (United Kingdom) Jack Pinnington Jones (Spain) Alejo Sánchez Quílez (United Kingdom) Billy Harris
August 31	CT Porto Cup; Porto, Portugal; Clay – Challenger 75 – 32S/24Q/16D; Singles – Doubles	(Argentina) Facundo Mena; 7–6^{(7–4)}, 6–4	(Bolivia) Hugo Dellien	(Brazil) Gustavo Heide (Spain) Pedro Vives Marcos	(Brazil) Thiago Monteiro (Spain) Oriol Roca Batalla (Spain) Alejandro Moro Cañas (Spain) Miguel Damas
August 31	CT Porto Cup; Porto, Portugal; Clay – Challenger 75 – 32S/24Q/16D; Singles – Doubles	(Spain) Sergio Martos Gornés (Poland) Szymon Walków; 6–4, 4–6, [10–5]	(Spain) Pedro Vives Marcos (Spain) Benjamín Winter López	(Brazil) Gustavo Heide (Spain) Pedro Vives Marcos	(Brazil) Thiago Monteiro (Spain) Oriol Roca Batalla (Spain) Alejandro Moro Cañas (Spain) Miguel Damas
August 31	International Challenger Zhangjiagang; Zhangjiagang, China; Hard – Challenger 75 – 32S/24Q/16D; Singles – Doubles	Ilia Simakin; 6–3, 6–1	(Thailand) Kasidit Samrej	(Chinese Taipei) Tseng Chun-hsin (Malaysia) Mitsuki Wei Kang Leong	(Australia) Enzo Aguiard (China) Sun Fajing; Ilya Ivashka (Japan) James Trotter
August 31	International Challenger Zhangjiagang; Zhangjiagang, China; Hard – Challenger 75 – 32S/24Q/16D; Singles – Doubles	(South Korea) Nam Ji-sung (South Korea) Park Ui-sung; 6–3, 4–6, [13–11]	(Australia) Joshua Charlton (China) Wang Aoran	(Chinese Taipei) Tseng Chun-hsin (Malaysia) Mitsuki Wei Kang Leong	(Australia) Enzo Aguiard (China) Sun Fajing; Ilya Ivashka (Japan) James Trotter
August 31	Plovdiv Challenger III; Plovdiv, Bulgaria; Clay – Challenger 50 – 32S/24Q/16D; Singles – Doubles	(Ukraine) Georgii Kravchenko; 6–0, 6–2	(Bulgaria) Yanaki Milev	(Serbia) Dušan Obradović (Argentina) Valerio Aboian	(Ukraine) Oleksandr Ovcharenko (France) Thomas Faurel (Argentina) Juan Manuel La Serna (Italy) Federico Iannaccone
August 31	Plovdiv Challenger III; Plovdiv, Bulgaria; Clay – Challenger 50 – 32S/24Q/16D; Singles – Doubles	(Argentina) Valerio Aboian (Argentina) Juan Manuel La Serna; 4–6, 7–5, [10–8]	(Bulgaria) Anthony Genov (Ukraine) Oleksandr Ovcharenko	(Serbia) Dušan Obradović (Argentina) Valerio Aboian	(Ukraine) Oleksandr Ovcharenko (France) Thomas Faurel (Argentina) Juan Manuel La Serna (Italy) Federico Iannaccone

=== September ===
Week of	Tournament	Champions	Runners-up	Semifinalists	Quarterfinalists
September 7	AON Open Challenger; Genoa, Italy; Clay – Challenger 125 – 32S/24Q/16D; Singles – Doubles	(Brazil) Thiago Seyboth Wild; 6–4, 6–2	(Spain) Pedro Martínez	(Croatia) Matej Dodig (Serbia) Laslo Djere	(Peru) Juan Pablo Varillas (Italy) Enrico Dalla Valle (Greece) Stefanos Sakellaridis (Argentina) Valerio Aboian
September 7	AON Open Challenger; Genoa, Italy; Clay – Challenger 125 – 32S/24Q/16D; Singles – Doubles	(Serbia) Stefan Latinović (Croatia) Mili Poljičak; 7–6^{(7–1)}, 6–7^{(3–7)}, [10–6]	(Croatia) Admir Kalender (Croatia) Nino Serdarušić	(Croatia) Matej Dodig (Serbia) Laslo Djere	(Peru) Juan Pablo Varillas (Italy) Enrico Dalla Valle (Greece) Stefanos Sakellaridis (Argentina) Valerio Aboian
September 7	Copa Sevilla; Seville, Spain; Clay – Challenger 125 – 32S/24Q/16D; Singles – Doubles	(Argentina) Facundo Díaz Acosta; 6–2, 6–1	(Serbia) Dušan Lajović	(Spain) Jaume Munar (Spain) Max Alcalá Gurri	(Italy) Raúl Brancaccio (Austria) Sebastian Ofner (Argentina) Genaro Alberto Olivieri (Portugal) Henrique Rocha
September 7	Copa Sevilla; Seville, Spain; Clay – Challenger 125 – 32S/24Q/16D; Singles – Doubles	(Colombia) Nicolás Barrientos (Argentina) Mariano Kestelboim; 7–6^{(7–3)}, 6–3	(Spain) Íñigo Cervantes (Ukraine) Denys Molchanov	(Spain) Jaume Munar (Spain) Max Alcalá Gurri	(Italy) Raúl Brancaccio (Austria) Sebastian Ofner (Argentina) Genaro Alberto Olivieri (Portugal) Henrique Rocha
September 7	Shanghai Challenger; Shanghai, China; Hard – Challenger 100 – 32S/24Q/16D; Singles – Doubles	Ilya Ivashka; 6–4, 3–6, 7–6^{(9–7)}	Marat Sharipov	(Switzerland) Luca Castelnuovo; Pavel Kotov	(South Korea) Nam Ji-sung (China) Zhou Yi (Canada) Alexis Galarneau (Australia) Omar Jasika
September 7	Shanghai Challenger; Shanghai, China; Hard – Challenger 100 – 32S/24Q/16D; Singles – Doubles	(Australia) Jake Delaney (Australia) Jesse Delaney; 6–4, 7–6^{(7–2)}	Petr Bar Biryukov (Italy) Alexander Binda	(Switzerland) Luca Castelnuovo; Pavel Kotov	(South Korea) Nam Ji-sung (China) Zhou Yi (Canada) Alexis Galarneau (Australia) Omar Jasika
September 7	NÖ Open; Tulln, Austria; Clay – Challenger 100 – 32S/24Q/16D; Singles – Doubles	(Switzerland) Mika Brunold; 6–4, 6–3	(Brazil) João Lucas Reis da Silva	(Argentina) Alex Barrena (Ukraine) Vitaliy Sachko	(Austria) Lukas Neumayer (Czech Republic) Zdeněk Kolář (Chile) Matías Soto (Brazil) Gustavo Heide
September 7	NÖ Open; Tulln, Austria; Clay – Challenger 100 – 32S/24Q/16D; Singles – Doubles	(Slovakia) Miloš Karol (Czech Republic) Andrew Paulson; 6–3, 3–6, [10–7]	(Romania) Victor Vlad Cornea (Austria) Maximilian Neuchrist	(Argentina) Alex Barrena (Ukraine) Vitaliy Sachko	(Austria) Lukas Neumayer (Czech Republic) Zdeněk Kolář (Chile) Matías Soto (Brazil) Gustavo Heide
September 7	Cassis Open Provence; Cassis, France; Hard – Challenger 75 – 32S/24Q/16D; Singles – Doubles	(France) Titouan Droguet; 6–4, 7–6^{(7–3)}	(Estonia) Mark Lajal	(Norway) Nicolai Budkov Kjær (Germany) Daniel Masur	(Estonia) Daniil Glinka (Tunisia) Moez Echargui (France) Robin Bertrand (France) Ugo Blanchet
September 7	Cassis Open Provence; Cassis, France; Hard – Challenger 75 – 32S/24Q/16D; Singles – Doubles	(France) Dan Added (Germany) Daniel Masur; 6–4, 6–2	(United Kingdom) Tom Hands (United Kingdom) Matthew Summers	(Norway) Nicolai Budkov Kjær (Germany) Daniel Masur	(Estonia) Daniil Glinka (Tunisia) Moez Echargui (France) Robin Bertrand (France) Ugo Blanchet
September 7	Istanbul Challenger; Istanbul, Turkey; Hard – Challenger 75 – 32S/24Q/16D; Singles – Doubles	(United Kingdom) Max Basing; 6–3, 1–6, 6–0	(Japan) Jay Friend	(Poland) Maks Kaśnikowski (France) Harold Mayot	(Italy) Francesco Maestrelli (Turkey) Yankı Erel (Bulgaria) Dimitar Kuzmanov (Lithuania) Edas Butvilas
September 7	Istanbul Challenger; Istanbul, Turkey; Hard – Challenger 75 – 32S/24Q/16D; Singles – Doubles	(United States) Alafia Ayeni (United States) Keshav Chopra; 6–3, 6–7^{(5–7)}, [10–7]	(Denmark) August Holmgren (Denmark) Carl Emil Overbeck	(Poland) Maks Kaśnikowski (France) Harold Mayot	(Italy) Francesco Maestrelli (Turkey) Yankı Erel (Bulgaria) Dimitar Kuzmanov (Lithuania) Edas Butvilas
September 7	Phan Thiết Challenger III; Phan Thiết, Vietnam; Hard – Challenger 50 – 32S/24Q/16D; Singles – Doubles	Ilia Simakin; 6–4, 7–6^{(7–5)}	(France) Arthur Weber	(Japan) Yuta Shimizu (Australia) Max Purcell	(Poland) Filip Peliwo (Japan) Hiroki Moriya (Australia) Philip Sekulic (Australia) Cruz Hewitt
September 7	Phan Thiết Challenger III; Phan Thiết, Vietnam; Hard – Challenger 50 – 32S/24Q/16D; Singles – Doubles	(France) Constantin Bittoun Kouzmine (India) S D Prajwal Dev; 6–1, 7–6^{(7–0)}	(Japan) Yamato Sueoka (Japan) Naoki Tajima	(Japan) Yuta Shimizu (Australia) Max Purcell	(Poland) Filip Peliwo (Japan) Hiroki Moriya (Australia) Philip Sekulic (Australia) Cruz Hewitt
September 14	Szczecin Open; Szczecin, Poland; Clay – Challenger 125 – 32S/24Q/16D; Singles – Doubles	(Spain) Nikolás Sánchez Izquierdo; 4–6, 6–3, 7–6^{(8–6)}	(Brazil) Thiago Monteiro	(Croatia) Luka Mikrut (Argentina) Marco Trungelliti	(Czech Republic) Zdeněk Kolář (Germany) Tom Gentzsch (Germany) Diego Dedura (Italy) Marco Cecchinato
September 14	Szczecin Open; Szczecin, Poland; Clay – Challenger 125 – 32S/24Q/16D; Singles – Doubles	(Czech Republic) Andrew Paulson (Portugal) Tiago Pereira; 6–2, 6–0	(Spain) Íñigo Cervantes (Ukraine) Denys Molchanov	(Croatia) Luka Mikrut (Argentina) Marco Trungelliti	(Czech Republic) Zdeněk Kolář (Germany) Tom Gentzsch (Germany) Diego Dedura (Italy) Marco Cecchinato
September 14	Tiburon Challenger; Tiburon, United States; Hard – Challenger 125 – 32S/24Q/16D; Singles – Doubles	(United States) Darwin Blanch; 3–6, 6–4, 6–2	(United States) Michael Mmoh	(United States) Michael Zheng (United States) J. J. Wolf	(United States) Mitchell Krueger (United States) Bryce Nakashima (Jordan) Abdullah Shelbayh (United States) Sebastian Gorzny
September 14	Tiburon Challenger; Tiburon, United States; Hard – Challenger 125 – 32S/24Q/16D; Singles – Doubles	(Mexico) Hans Hach Verdugo (United States) JJ Tracy; 7–6^{(9–7)}, 6–4	(United States) Nathaniel Lammons (United States) Jackson Withrow	(United States) Michael Zheng (United States) J. J. Wolf	(United States) Mitchell Krueger (United States) Bryce Nakashima (Jordan) Abdullah Shelbayh (United States) Sebastian Gorzny
September 14	Guangzhou Huangpu International Tennis Open; Guangzhou, China; Hard – Challenger 100 – 32S/24Q/16D; Singles – Doubles	Marat Sharipov; 6–0, 6–3	Pavel Kotov	(Australia) Bernard Tomic; Petr Bar Biryukov	(Japan) Rio Noguchi (Italy) Alexander Binda (Sweden) Elias Ymer (Malaysia) Mitsuki Wei Kang Leong
September 14	Guangzhou Huangpu International Tennis Open; Guangzhou, China; Hard – Challenger 100 – 32S/24Q/16D; Singles – Doubles	(Australia) Blake Bayldon (India) Arjun Kadhe; 7–5, 3–6, [10–7]	(Mexico) Miguel Ángel Reyes-Varela (United States) Reese Stalder	(Australia) Bernard Tomic; Petr Bar Biryukov	(Japan) Rio Noguchi (Italy) Alexander Binda (Sweden) Elias Ymer (Malaysia) Mitsuki Wei Kang Leong
September 14	Open de Rennes; Rennes, France; Hard (i) – Challenger 100 – 32S/24Q/16D; Singles – Doubles	(France) Sascha Gueymard Wayenburg; 4–6, 6–3, 7–5	(France) Harold Mayot	(Australia) Tristan Schoolkate (France) Titouan Droguet	(France) Matisse Bobichon (France) Clément Chidekh (Italy) Francesco Maestrelli (Croatia) Borna Gojo
September 14	Open de Rennes; Rennes, France; Hard (i) – Challenger 100 – 32S/24Q/16D; Singles – Doubles	(Netherlands) Sander Arends (Netherlands) Bart Stevens; 6–1, 6–1	Ivan Liutarevich (United Kingdom) Joshua Paris	(Australia) Tristan Schoolkate (France) Titouan Droguet	(France) Matisse Bobichon (France) Clément Chidekh (Italy) Francesco Maestrelli (Croatia) Borna Gojo
September 14	Città di Biella; Biella, Italy; Clay – Challenger 50 – 32S/24Q/16D; Singles – Doubles	(Italy) Carlo Alberto Caniato; 7–6^{(7–1)}, 6–4	(Spain) Alejandro Moro Cañas	(Argentina) Alex Barrena (United Kingdom) Jay Clarke	(Switzerland) Mika Brunold (Italy) Juan Cruz Martin Manzano (Spain) Oriol Roca Batalla (United Kingdom) Felix Gill
September 14	Città di Biella; Biella, Italy; Clay – Challenger 50 – 32S/24Q/16D; Singles – Doubles	(Italy) Francesco Forti (Italy) Filippo Romano; 4–6, 7–5, [10–8]	(Italy) Franco Agamenone (Argentina) Máximo Zeitune	(Argentina) Alex Barrena (United Kingdom) Jay Clarke	(Switzerland) Mika Brunold (Italy) Juan Cruz Martin Manzano (Spain) Oriol Roca Batalla (United Kingdom) Felix Gill
September 14	Phan Thiết Challenger IV; Phan Thiết, Vietnam; Hard – Challenger 50 – 32S/24Q/16D; Singles – Doubles	Ilia Simakin; 6–7^{(4–7)}, 6–4, 6–3	(Mexico) Rodrigo Pacheco Méndez	(France) Moïse Kouamé (United States) Hunter Heck	(France) Florent Bax (Australia) Philip Sekulic (Australia) Cruz Hewitt (Australia) Matthew Dellavedova
September 14	Phan Thiết Challenger IV; Phan Thiết, Vietnam; Hard – Challenger 50 – 32S/24Q/16D; Singles – Doubles	(France) Constantin Bittoun Kouzmine (India) S D Prajwal Dev; 6–4, 7–6^{(7–1)}	(Australia) Joshua Charlton (Japan) Yuta Shimizu	(France) Moïse Kouamé (United States) Hunter Heck	(France) Florent Bax (Australia) Philip Sekulic (Australia) Cruz Hewitt (Australia) Matthew Dellavedova
September 21	Saint-Tropez Open; Saint-Tropez, France; Hard – Challenger 125 – 32S/24Q/16D; Singles – Doubles	(France) Titouan Droguet; 6–3, 7–5	(France) Harold Mayot	(Croatia) Dino Prižmić (United States) Murphy Cassone	(Estonia) Mark Lajal (Estonia) Daniil Glinka (Netherlands) Jesper de Jong (Germany) Daniel Masur
September 21	Saint-Tropez Open; Saint-Tropez, France; Hard – Challenger 125 – 32S/24Q/16D; Singles – Doubles	(Switzerland) Jakub Paul (Czech Republic) Matěj Vocel; 6–4, 6–3	(France) Constantin Bittoun Kouzmine (Germany) Daniel Masur	(Croatia) Dino Prižmić (United States) Murphy Cassone	(Estonia) Mark Lajal (Estonia) Daniil Glinka (Netherlands) Jesper de Jong (Germany) Daniel Masur
September 21	Challenger de Buenos Aires; Buenos Aires, Argentina; Clay – Challenger 75 – 32S/24Q/16D; Singles – Doubles	(Argentina) Alex Barrena; 6–4, 6–0	(Argentina) Facundo Mena	(Uruguay) Joaquín Aguilar Cardozo (Brazil) Pedro Boscardin Dias	(Peru) Juan Pablo Varillas (Bolivia) Juan Carlos Prado Ángelo (Brazil) Eduardo Ribeiro (Argentina) Nicolás Kicker
September 21	Challenger de Buenos Aires; Buenos Aires, Argentina; Clay – Challenger 75 – 32S/24Q/16D; Singles – Doubles	(Argentina) Mariano Kestelboim (Argentina) Santiago Rodríguez Taverna; 6–4, 4–6, [10–5]	(Bolivia) Murkel Dellien (Bolivia) Federico Zeballos	(Uruguay) Joaquín Aguilar Cardozo (Brazil) Pedro Boscardin Dias	(Peru) Juan Pablo Varillas (Bolivia) Juan Carlos Prado Ángelo (Brazil) Eduardo Ribeiro (Argentina) Nicolás Kicker
September 21	De Wave Open Challenger; Genoa, Italy; Clay – Challenger 75 – 32S/24Q/16D; Singles – Doubles	(Croatia) Luka Mikrut; 6–4, 7–5	(Italy) Carlo Alberto Caniato	(Germany) Marvin Möller (Italy) Francesco Forti	(United States) Dali Blanch (Austria) Lukas Neumayer (Germany) Mika Petkovic (United Kingdom) Jay Clarke
September 21	De Wave Open Challenger; Genoa, Italy; Clay – Challenger 75 – 32S/24Q/16D; Singles – Doubles	(Spain) Íñigo Cervantes (Ukraine) Denys Molchanov; 6–2, 6–7^{(6–8)}, [10–7]	(Finland) Patrik Niklas-Salminen (Czech Republic) Michael Vrbenský	(Germany) Marvin Möller (Italy) Francesco Forti	(United States) Dali Blanch (Austria) Lukas Neumayer (Germany) Mika Petkovic (United Kingdom) Jay Clarke
September 21	Plovdiv Challenger IV; Plovdiv, Bulgaria; Clay – Challenger 75 – 32S/24Q/16D; Singles – Doubles	(Spain) Max Alcalá Gurri; 6–4, 6–2	(Czech Republic) Jonáš Forejtek	(Spain) Carlos Taberner (Bulgaria) Adrian Andreev	(Spain) Pol Martín Tiffon (France) Calvin Hemery (Spain) Izan Almazán Valiente (United Kingdom) Felix Gill
September 21	Plovdiv Challenger IV; Plovdiv, Bulgaria; Clay – Challenger 75 – 32S/24Q/16D; Singles – Doubles	(Slovakia) Miloš Karol (Czech Republic) Andrew Paulson; 6–3, 6–4	(Romania) Bogdan Pavel (Spain) Benjamín Winter López	(Spain) Carlos Taberner (Bulgaria) Adrian Andreev	(Spain) Pol Martín Tiffon (France) Calvin Hemery (Spain) Izan Almazán Valiente (United Kingdom) Felix Gill
September 21	San Diego Challenger; San Diego, United States; Hard – Challenger 75 – 32S/24Q/16D; Singles – Doubles	(United States) Nishesh Basavareddy; 7–5, 6–4	(Brazil) Igor Marcondes	(Switzerland) Dylan Dietrich (France) Timo Legout	(Ecuador) Andy Andrade (United Kingdom) Henry Searle (United States) Tristan Boyer (Argentina) Federico Agustín Gómez
September 21	San Diego Challenger; San Diego, United States; Hard – Challenger 75 – 32S/24Q/16D; Singles – Doubles	(Netherlands) Stian Klaassen (United States) Christopher Papa; 7–6^{(8–6)}, 5–7, [10–3]	(United States) Vignesh Gogineni (United States) Noah Zamora	(Switzerland) Dylan Dietrich (France) Timo Legout	(Ecuador) Andy Andrade (United Kingdom) Henry Searle (United States) Tristan Boyer (Argentina) Federico Agustín Gómez
September 28	Porto Open; Porto, Portugal; Hard – Challenger 125 – 32S/24Q/16D; Singles – Doubles	(Portugal) Henrique Rocha; 2–6, 6–4, 6–4	(Spain) Iñaki Montes de la Torre	(Switzerland) Jérôme Kym (Spain) David Jordà Sanchis	(Denmark) August Holmgren (Lithuania) Edas Butvilas (Spain) Daniel Rincón (France) Hugo Grenier
September 28	Porto Open; Porto, Portugal; Hard – Challenger 125 – 32S/24Q/16D; Singles – Doubles	(Serbia) Stefan Latinović (Croatia) Mili Poljičak; 6–3, 6–4	(Bulgaria) Alexander Donski (Poland) Filip Pieczonka	(Switzerland) Jérôme Kym (Spain) David Jordà Sanchis	(Denmark) August Holmgren (Lithuania) Edas Butvilas (Spain) Daniel Rincón (France) Hugo Grenier
September 28	Jingshan Tennis Open; Jingshan, China; Hard – Challenger 100 – 32S/24Q/16D; Singles – Doubles	(South Africa) Lloyd Harris; 1–6, 6–3, 7–6^{(7–4)}	(Italy) Mattia Bellucci	(Turkey) Yankı Erel (Australia) Alex Bolt	(Italy) Federico Cinà (Australia) Bernard Tomic (United States) Andre Ilagan (Australia) Dane Sweeny
September 28	Jingshan Tennis Open; Jingshan, China; Hard – Challenger 100 – 32S/24Q/16D; Singles – Doubles	(Ecuador) Gonzalo Escobar (India) Niki Kaliyanda Poonacha; 7–5, 6–2	(Mexico) Miguel Ángel Reyes-Varela (United States) Reese Stalder	(Turkey) Yankı Erel (Australia) Alex Bolt	(Italy) Federico Cinà (Australia) Bernard Tomic (United States) Andre Ilagan (Australia) Dane Sweeny
September 28	Columbus Challenger; Columbus, United States; Hard (i) – Challenger 75 – 32S/24Q/16D; Singles – Doubles	(Switzerland) Dylan Dietrich; 6–3, 6–2	(Jordan) Abdullah Shelbayh	(Ecuador) Andy Andrade (United States) Mitchell Krueger	(United States) Darwin Blanch (Netherlands) Mees Röttgering (United States) Aidan Mayo (United States) Keegan Smith
September 28	Columbus Challenger; Columbus, United States; Hard (i) – Challenger 75 – 32S/24Q/16D; Singles – Doubles	(United States) Brandon Carpico (United States) Nikita Samuel Filin; 7–6^{(7–3)}, 2–6, [10–4]	(United States) Daniel Milavsky (United States) Braden Shick	(Ecuador) Andy Andrade (United States) Mitchell Krueger	(United States) Darwin Blanch (Netherlands) Mees Röttgering (United States) Aidan Mayo (United States) Keegan Smith
September 28	Curitiba Challenger; Curitiba, Brazil; Clay – Challenger 75 – 32S/24Q/16D; Singles – Doubles	(Argentina) Guido Iván Justo; 6–1, 6–4	(Brazil) Gustavo Heide	(Brazil) Pedro Boscardin Dias (Chile) Tomás Barrios Vera	(Argentina) Lautaro Midón (Brazil) Guto Miguel (Argentina) Gonzalo Villanueva (Brazil) Matheus Pucinelli de Almeida
September 28	Curitiba Challenger; Curitiba, Brazil; Clay – Challenger 75 – 32S/24Q/16D; Singles – Doubles	(Argentina) Mariano Kestelboim (Brazil) Marcelo Zormann; 5–7, 7–6^{(7–3)}, [10–7]	(Brazil) Guto Miguel (Brazil) Eduardo Ribeiro	(Brazil) Pedro Boscardin Dias (Chile) Tomás Barrios Vera	(Argentina) Lautaro Midón (Brazil) Guto Miguel (Argentina) Gonzalo Villanueva (Brazil) Matheus Pucinelli de Almeida
September 28	Open de Vendée; Mouilleron-le-Captif, France; Hard (i) – Challenger 75 – 32S/24Q/16D; Singles – Doubles	(France) Clément Chidekh; 6–2, 6–0	(France) Sascha Gueymard Wayenburg	(Austria) Joel Schwärzler (Switzerland) Henry Bernet	(France) Lucas Poullain (France) Clément Tabur (France) Harold Mayot (France) Felix Balshaw
September 28	Open de Vendée; Mouilleron-le-Captif, France; Hard (i) – Challenger 75 – 32S/24Q/16D; Singles – Doubles	(United States) Karl Poling (United States) Joshua Sheehy; 7–6^{(7–4)}, 4–6, [10–3]	(United Kingdom) Finn Bass (United Kingdom) Scott Duncan	(Austria) Joel Schwärzler (Switzerland) Henry Bernet	(France) Lucas Poullain (France) Clément Tabur (France) Harold Mayot (France) Felix Balshaw
September 28	Levante Open; Bari, Italy; Clay – Challenger 50 – 32S/24Q/16D; Singles – Doubles	(Italy) Samuele Pieri; 6–4, 6–1	(Italy) Juan Cruz Martin Manzano	(Czech Republic) Matthew William Donald (Ukraine) Vitaliy Sachko	(Italy) Enrico Dalla Valle (Czech Republic) Martin Krumich (Italy) Gianluca Cadenasso (Spain) Carlos Taberner
September 28	Levante Open; Bari, Italy; Clay – Challenger 50 – 32S/24Q/16D; Singles – Doubles	(Ukraine) Oleksandr Ovcharenko (Germany) Kai Wehnelt; 6–1, 6–3	(Mexico) Luis Carlos Álvarez (Germany) Adrian Oetzbach	(Czech Republic) Matthew William Donald (Ukraine) Vitaliy Sachko	(Italy) Enrico Dalla Valle (Czech Republic) Martin Krumich (Italy) Gianluca Cadenasso (Spain) Carlos Taberner

=== October ===
Week of	Tournament	Champions	Runners-up	Semifinalists	Quarterfinalists
October 5	Ferrero Challenger; Villena, Spain; Hard – Challenger 100 – 32S/24Q/16D; Singles – Doubles	(Serbia) Laslo Djere; 6–4, 6–4	(Estonia) Daniil Glinka	(United Kingdom) Jack Pinnington Jones (Spain) Pedro Martínez	(Croatia) Borna Gojo (Jordan) Abdullah Shelbayh (Spain) Pablo Llamas Ruiz (Czech Republic) Hynek Bartoň
October 5	Ferrero Challenger; Villena, Spain; Hard – Challenger 100 – 32S/24Q/16D; Singles – Doubles	(United States) Benjamin Kittay (Japan) Takeru Yuzuki; 6–4, 5–7, [10–7]	(Israel) Daniel Cukierman (Brazil) Fernando Romboli	(United Kingdom) Jack Pinnington Jones (Spain) Pedro Martínez	(Croatia) Borna Gojo (Jordan) Abdullah Shelbayh (Spain) Pablo Llamas Ruiz (Czech Republic) Hynek Bartoň
October 5	Antofagasta Challenger; Antofagasta, Chile; Clay – Challenger 75 – 32S/24Q/16D; Singles – Doubles	(Brazil) João Lucas Reis da Silva; 7–6^{(7–2)}, 1–6, 6–2	(Brazil) Thiago Seyboth Wild	(Argentina) Lautaro Midón (Bolivia) Juan Carlos Prado Ángelo	(Brazil) Eduardo Ribeiro (Brazil) Felipe Meligeni Alves (Colombia) Miguel Tobón (Brazil) Matheus Pucinelli de Almeida
October 5	Antofagasta Challenger; Antofagasta, Chile; Clay – Challenger 75 – 32S/24Q/16D; Singles – Doubles	(Brazil) Eduardo Ribeiro (Brazil) Marcelo Zormann; 6–1, 6–3	(Mexico) Alan Magadán (Peru) Alexander Merino	(Argentina) Lautaro Midón (Bolivia) Juan Carlos Prado Ángelo	(Brazil) Eduardo Ribeiro (Brazil) Felipe Meligeni Alves (Colombia) Miguel Tobón (Brazil) Matheus Pucinelli de Almeida
October 5	Braga Open; Braga, Portugal; Clay – Challenger 75 – 32S/24Q/16D; Singles – Doubles	(Croatia) Matej Dodig; 3–6, 6–3, 6–2	(Denmark) Elmer Møller	(Lithuania) Vilius Gaubas (Austria) Lukas Neumayer	(Portugal) Tiago Pereira (Croatia) Luka Mikrut (Germany) Marvin Möller (Spain) Max Alcalá Gurri
October 5	Braga Open; Braga, Portugal; Clay – Challenger 75 – 32S/24Q/16D; Singles – Doubles	(Morocco) Younes Lalami (Spain) Mario Mansilla Díez; 6–3, 2–6, [16–14]	(Poland) Karol Drzewiecki (Croatia) Admir Kalender	(Lithuania) Vilius Gaubas (Austria) Lukas Neumayer	(Portugal) Tiago Pereira (Croatia) Luka Mikrut (Germany) Marvin Möller (Spain) Max Alcalá Gurri
October 5	Internazionali di Sicilia; Palermo, Italy; Clay – Challenger 50 – 32S/24Q/16D; Singles – Doubles	(Italy) Francesco Passaro; 6–3, 6–7^{(2–7)}, 7–6^{(7–4)}	(Czech Republic) Jonáš Forejtek	(Spain) Alejandro Moro Cañas (Bulgaria) Yanaki Milev	(Italy) Michele Ribecai (Italy) Massimo Giunta (Italy) Enrico Dalla Valle (Spain) Carlos Sánchez Jover
October 5	Internazionali di Sicilia; Palermo, Italy; Clay – Challenger 50 – 32S/24Q/16D; Singles – Doubles	(Ukraine) Oleksandr Ovcharenko (Germany) Kai Wehnelt; 7–5, 6–2	(Czech Republic) Jonáš Forejtek (Germany) Max Wiskandt	(Spain) Alejandro Moro Cañas (Bulgaria) Yanaki Milev	(Italy) Michele Ribecai (Italy) Massimo Giunta (Italy) Enrico Dalla Valle (Spain) Carlos Sánchez Jover
October 5	Wuning Challenger III; Wuning, China; Hard – Challenger 50 – 32S/24Q/16D; Singles – Doubles	Alibek Kachmazov; 4–6, 7–6^{(9–7)}, 7–6^{(8–6)}	(Japan) Jay Friend	(Japan) Keisuke Saitoh (Australia) Omar Jasika	(Japan) Akira Santillan (United States) Ryan Seggerman (China) Sun Fajing; Timofei Derepasko
October 5	Wuning Challenger III; Wuning, China; Hard – Challenger 50 – 32S/24Q/16D; Singles – Doubles	(Japan) Akira Santillan (China) Zheng Baoluo; 3–6, 6–3, [10-4]	Yaroslav Demin; Timofei Derepasko	(Japan) Keisuke Saitoh (Australia) Omar Jasika	(Japan) Akira Santillan (United States) Ryan Seggerman (China) Sun Fajing; Timofei Derepasko
October 12	Jinan Open; Jinan, China; Hard – Challenger 125 – 32S/24Q/16D; Singles – Doubles	(Italy) Mattia Bellucci; 6–2, 4–6, 6–3	(Spain) Martín Landaluce	(Japan) Shintaro Mochizuki (Canada) Liam Draxl	(Kazakhstan) Alexander Shevchenko (Japan) Yosuke Watanuki (United States) Keegan Smith (Czech Republic) Tomáš Macháč
October 12	Jinan Open; Jinan, China; Hard – Challenger 125 – 32S/24Q/16D; Singles – Doubles	(Japan) Jay Friend (Chinese Taipei) Ray Ho; 2–6, 7–6^{(7–5)}, [10–4]	(Netherlands) Thijmen Loof (Japan) Kaito Uesugi	(Japan) Shintaro Mochizuki (Canada) Liam Draxl	(Kazakhstan) Alexander Shevchenko (Japan) Yosuke Watanuki (United States) Keegan Smith (Czech Republic) Tomáš Macháč
October 12	Olbia Challenger; Olbia, Italy; Hard – Challenger 125 – 32S/24Q/16D; Singles – Doubles	(Bosnia and Herzegovina) Damir Džumhur; 7–6^{(7–4)}, 6–3	(United Kingdom) Jacob Fearnley	(Italy) Luca Nardi (Poland) Maks Kaśnikowski	(Czech Republic) Maxim Mrva (United States) Michael Mmoh (Italy) Stefano Travaglia (Germany) Tom Gentzsch
October 12	Olbia Challenger; Olbia, Italy; Hard – Challenger 125 – 32S/24Q/16D; Singles – Doubles	(Netherlands) Jarno Jans (Belgium) Joran Vliegen; 6–3, 6–4	(Israel) Daniel Cukierman (Brazil) Fernando Romboli	(Italy) Luca Nardi (Poland) Maks Kaśnikowski	(Czech Republic) Maxim Mrva (United States) Michael Mmoh (Italy) Stefano Travaglia (Germany) Tom Gentzsch
October 12	Maia Challenger; Maia, Portugal; Clay (i) – Challenger 100 – 32S/24Q/16D; Singles – Doubles	(Italy) Francesco Passaro; 4–6, 6–3, 6–2	(Hungary) Zsombor Piros	(Croatia) Matej Dodig (Spain) Alejo Sánchez Quílez	(Argentina) Marco Trungelliti (United States) Tristan Boyer (Italy) Lorenzo Giustino (Croatia) Luka Mikrut
October 12	Maia Challenger; Maia, Portugal; Clay (i) – Challenger 100 – 32S/24Q/16D; Singles – Doubles	(Slovakia) Miloš Karol (Czech Republic) Andrew Paulson; 4–6, 6–1, [11–9]	(Portugal) Tiago Pereira (Spain) Benjamín Winter López	(Croatia) Matej Dodig (Spain) Alejo Sánchez Quílez	(Argentina) Marco Trungelliti (United States) Tristan Boyer (Italy) Lorenzo Giustino (Croatia) Luka Mikrut
October 12	Open de Roanne; Roanne, France; Hard (i) – Challenger 100 – 32S/24Q/16D; Singles – Doubles	(Switzerland) Mika Brunold; 2–6, 7–6^{(7–5)}, 6–1	(France) Matteo Martineau	(Norway) Nicolai Budkov Kjær (Switzerland) Jérôme Kym	(France) Hugo Gaston (France) Sascha Gueymard Wayenburg (Switzerland) Dominic Stricker (France) Felix Balshaw
October 12	Open de Roanne; Roanne, France; Hard (i) – Challenger 100 – 32S/24Q/16D; Singles – Doubles	(Monaco) Romain Arneodo (Germany) Hendrik Jebens; 6–4, 6–4	(United Kingdom) David Stevenson (United Kingdom) Marcus Willis	(Norway) Nicolai Budkov Kjær (Switzerland) Jérôme Kym	(France) Hugo Gaston (France) Sascha Gueymard Wayenburg (Switzerland) Dominic Stricker (France) Felix Balshaw
October 12	Santa Cruz Challenger II; Santa Cruz de la Sierra, Bolivia; Clay – Challenger 75 – 32S/24Q/16D; Singles – Doubles	(Brazil) Thiago Seyboth Wild; 6–4, 6–3	(Bolivia) Hugo Dellien	(Argentina) Francisco Comesaña (Argentina) Juan Manuel La Serna	(Argentina) Genaro Alberto Olivieri (Argentina) Nicolás Kicker (Uruguay) Franco Roncadelli (Brazil) Guto Miguel
October 12	Santa Cruz Challenger II; Santa Cruz de la Sierra, Bolivia; Clay – Challenger 75 – 32S/24Q/16D; Singles – Doubles	(Ecuador) Diego Hidalgo (Argentina) Mariano Kestelboim; 1–6, 6–4, [10–8]	(Brazil) Guto Miguel (Brazil) Eduardo Ribeiro	(Argentina) Francisco Comesaña (Argentina) Juan Manuel La Serna	(Argentina) Genaro Alberto Olivieri (Argentina) Nicolás Kicker (Uruguay) Franco Roncadelli (Brazil) Guto Miguel
October 12	Trofeo Città di San Gregorio; Catania, Italy; Clay – Challenger 50 – 32S/24Q/16D; Singles – Doubles	(Italy) Gianluca Cadenasso; 6–4, 3–6, 6–4	(Romania) Radu Mihai Papoe	(Italy) Massimo Giunta (United Kingdom) Felix Gill	(Germany) Max Wiskandt (Germany) Marvin Möller (Belgium) Buvaysar Gadamauri (Czech Republic) Zdeněk Kolář
October 12	Trofeo Città di San Gregorio; Catania, Italy; Clay – Challenger 50 – 32S/24Q/16D; Singles – Doubles	(Ukraine) Oleksandr Ovcharenko (Germany) Kai Wehnelt; 6–4, 6–2	(Spain) Ignasi Forcano (Morocco) Younes Lalami	(Italy) Massimo Giunta (United Kingdom) Felix Gill	(Germany) Max Wiskandt (Germany) Marvin Möller (Belgium) Buvaysar Gadamauri (Czech Republic) Zdeněk Kolář
October 19	Lisboa Belém Open; Lisbon, Portugal; Clay – Challenger 100 – 32S/24Q/16D; Singles – Doubles	(Switzerland) Alexander Ritschard; 6–2, 6–1	Svyatoslav Gulin	(Argentina) Marco Trungelliti (Denmark) Elmer Møller	(Croatia) Matej Dodig (India) Sumit Nagal (Italy) Andrea Pellegrino (Portugal) Henrique Rocha
October 19	Lisboa Belém Open; Lisbon, Portugal; Clay – Challenger 100 – 32S/24Q/16D; Singles – Doubles	(Portugal) Tiago Pereira (Spain) Benjamín Winter López; 4–6, 6–3, [10–5]	(Poland) Karol Drzewiecki (Poland) Piotr Matuszewski	(Argentina) Marco Trungelliti (Denmark) Elmer Møller	(Croatia) Matej Dodig (India) Sumit Nagal (Italy) Andrea Pellegrino (Portugal) Henrique Rocha
October 19	Cali Open; Cali, Colombia; Clay – Challenger 75 – 32S/24Q/16D; Singles – Doubles	(Brazil) Matheus Pucinelli de Almeida; 7–6^{(7–1)}, 6–3	(Argentina) Valerio Aboian	(Brazil) Gustavo Heide (Brazil) Felipe Meligeni Alves	(Argentina) Santiago Rodríguez Taverna (Argentina) Juan Manuel La Serna (Argentina) Carlos María Zárate (Colombia) Miguel Tobón
October 19	Cali Open; Cali, Colombia; Clay – Challenger 75 – 32S/24Q/16D; Singles – Doubles	(Bolivia) Federico Zeballos (Brazil) Marcelo Zormann; 5–5 ret.	(Mexico) Alan Magadán (Mexico) Rodrigo Pacheco Méndez	(Brazil) Gustavo Heide (Brazil) Felipe Meligeni Alves	(Argentina) Santiago Rodríguez Taverna (Argentina) Juan Manuel La Serna (Argentina) Carlos María Zárate (Colombia) Miguel Tobón
October 19	Fort Worth Challenger; Fort Worth, United States; Hard – Challenger 75 – 32S/24Q/16D; Singles – Doubles	(United States) Jenson Brooksby; 6–1, 6–4	(United States) Darwin Blanch	(France) Gabriel Debru (Netherlands) Sander Jong	(United States) Patrick Maloney; Erik Arutiunian (United States) Aidan Mayo (Netherlands) Mees Röttgering
October 19	Fort Worth Challenger; Fort Worth, United States; Hard – Challenger 75 – 32S/24Q/16D; Singles – Doubles	(Spain) Albert Pedrico Kravtsov (United States) Cooper Woestendick; Walkover	(United Kingdom) James Hopper (Japan) Shunsuke Mitsui	(France) Gabriel Debru (Netherlands) Sander Jong	(United States) Patrick Maloney; Erik Arutiunian (United States) Aidan Mayo (Netherlands) Mees Röttgering
October 19	Guangzhou International Challenger; Nansha, China; Hard – Challenger 75 – 32S/24Q/16D; Singles – Doubles	(Australia) Tristan Schoolkate; 4–6, 7–6^{(7–3)}, 6–4	(Hong Kong) Coleman Wong	(China) Zhou Yi (China) Cui Jie	(Japan) Jay Friend (United States) Andre Ilagan (United States) Keegan Smith (Japan) Akira Santillan
October 19	Guangzhou International Challenger; Nansha, China; Hard – Challenger 75 – 32S/24Q/16D; Singles – Doubles	(Netherlands) Thijmen Loof (Japan) Kaito Uesugi; 6–2, 6–2	(Chinese Taipei) Hsu Yu-hsiou (China) Sun Fajing	(China) Zhou Yi (China) Cui Jie	(Japan) Jay Friend (United States) Andre Ilagan (United States) Keegan Smith (Japan) Akira Santillan
October 19	Florence Challenger; Florence, Italy; Clay – Challenger 50 – 32S/24Q/16D; Singles – Doubles	(Italy) Filippo Romano; 6–3, 4–6, 6–2	(Italy) Michele Ribecai	(Spain) Oriol Roca Batalla (Austria) Sandro Kopp	(Italy) Francesco Forti (Austria) Filip Misolic (Spain) Àlex Martí Pujolràs (Czech Republic) Matthew William Donald
October 19	Florence Challenger; Florence, Italy; Clay – Challenger 50 – 32S/24Q/16D; Singles – Doubles	(Netherlands) Mats Hermans (Netherlands) Max Houkes; 7–5, 4–6, [10–8]	(Italy) Jacopo Bilardo (Italy) Giorgio Ricca	(Spain) Oriol Roca Batalla (Austria) Sandro Kopp	(Italy) Francesco Forti (Austria) Filip Misolic (Spain) Àlex Martí Pujolràs (Czech Republic) Matthew William Donald
October 26	Seoul Open Challenger; Seoul, South Korea; Hard – Challenger 125 – 32S/24Q/16D; Singles – Doubles	(France) Térence Atmane; 7–6^{(7–3)}, 3–6, 7–6^{(11–9)}	(Hong Kong) Coleman Wong	(United Kingdom) Billy Harris (Australia) Omar Jasika	(Japan) Rei Sakamoto (South Korea) Hong Seong-chan (Japan) Sho Shimabukuro (South Korea) Chung Yun-seong
October 26	Seoul Open Challenger; Seoul, South Korea; Hard – Challenger 125 – 32S/24Q/16D; Singles – Doubles	(New Zealand) Finn Reynolds (New Zealand) James Watt; 6–3, 3–6, [10–5]	(Australia) Blake Bayldon (Australia) Thomas Fancutt	(United Kingdom) Billy Harris (Australia) Omar Jasika	(Japan) Rei Sakamoto (South Korea) Hong Seong-chan (Japan) Sho Shimabukuro (South Korea) Chung Yun-seong
October 26	Brest Challenger; Brest, France; Hard (i) – Challenger 100 – 32S/24Q/16D; Singles – Doubles	(France) Moïse Kouamé; 6–4, 6–7^{(5–7)}, 7–6^{(7–4)}	(United States) Martin Damm	(Finland) Otto Virtanen (Croatia) Dino Prižmić	(Italy) Francesco Maestrelli (Italy) Stefano Travaglia (France) Clément Tabur (Italy) Federico Cinà
October 26	Brest Challenger; Brest, France; Hard (i) – Challenger 100 – 32S/24Q/16D; Singles – Doubles	(Ecuador) Gonzalo Escobar (India) Niki Kaliyanda Poonacha; 7–6^{(7–4)}, 6–7^{(4–7)}, [10–7]	(India) Sriram Balaji (United States) Evan King	(Finland) Otto Virtanen (Croatia) Dino Prižmić	(Italy) Francesco Maestrelli (Italy) Stefano Travaglia (France) Clément Tabur (Italy) Federico Cinà
October 26	Sioux Falls Challenger; Sioux Falls, United States; Hard (i) – Challenger 100 – 32S/24Q/16D; Singles – Doubles	(Switzerland) Dylan Dietrich; 1–6, 6–3, 6–4	(Canada) Liam Draxl	(United States) Aidan Mayo (Slovenia) Sebastian Dominko	(United States) J. J. Wolf (Netherlands) Mees Röttgering (United States) Darwin Blanch (Germany) Max Hans Rehberg
October 26	Sioux Falls Challenger; Sioux Falls, United States; Hard (i) – Challenger 100 – 32S/24Q/16D; Singles – Doubles	(Netherlands) Jarno Jans (Belgium) Joran Vliegen; 6–4, 7–6^{(9–7)}	(Mexico) Miguel Ángel Reyes-Varela (United States) Reese Stalder	(United States) Aidan Mayo (Slovenia) Sebastian Dominko	(United States) J. J. Wolf (Netherlands) Mees Röttgering (United States) Darwin Blanch (Germany) Max Hans Rehberg
October 26	Challenger Ciudad de Guayaquil; Guayaquil, Ecuador; Clay – Challenger 75 – 32S/24Q/16D; Singles – Doubles	(Bolivia) Hugo Dellien; 7–5, 1–0 ret.	(Uruguay) Joaquín Aguilar Cardozo	(Brazil) João Lucas Reis da Silva (Argentina) Valerio Aboian	(Argentina) Camilo Ugo Carabelli (Argentina) Lautaro Midón (Dominican Republic) Nick Hardt (Argentina) Carlos Maria Zárate
October 26	Challenger Ciudad de Guayaquil; Guayaquil, Ecuador; Clay – Challenger 75 – 32S/24Q/16D; Singles – Doubles	(Ecuador) Diego Hidalgo (Argentina) Mariano Kestelboim; 7–5, 6–7^{(4–7)}, [10–7]	(Poland) Karol Drzewiecki (Poland) Piotr Matuszewski	(Brazil) João Lucas Reis da Silva (Argentina) Valerio Aboian	(Argentina) Camilo Ugo Carabelli (Argentina) Lautaro Midón (Dominican Republic) Nick Hardt (Argentina) Carlos Maria Zárate
October 26	Ningbo Challenger; Ningbo, China; Hard – Challenger 75 – 32S/24Q/16D; Singles – Doubles	Yaroslav Demin; 5–7, 6–2, 7–6^{(8–6)}	Petr Bar Biryukov	(United Kingdom) Liam Broady (Chinese Taipei) Hsu Yu-hsiou	(China) Cui Jie (Australia) Jake Delaney (France) Harold Mayot (Turkey) Mert Alkaya
October 26	Ningbo Challenger; Ningbo, China; Hard – Challenger 75 – 32S/24Q/16D; Singles – Doubles	(Japan) Akira Santillan (China) Zheng Baoluo; 6–3, 7–5	(Chinese Taipei) Hsieh Cheng-peng (Japan) Kaichi Uchida	(United Kingdom) Liam Broady (Chinese Taipei) Hsu Yu-hsiou	(China) Cui Jie (Australia) Jake Delaney (France) Harold Mayot (Turkey) Mert Alkaya

=== November ===
Week of	Tournament	Champions	Runners-up	Semifinalists	Quarterfinalists
November 2	Costa do Sauípe Open; Sauipe, Brazil; Clay – Challenger 125 – 32S/24Q/16D; Singles – Doubles	(Argentina) Camilo Ugo Carabelli; 6–2, 7–5	(Brazil) Thiago Seyboth Wild	(Argentina) Facundo Díaz Acosta (Peru) Gonzalo Bueno	(Italy) Marco Cecchinato (Brazil) João Lucas Reis da Silva (Argentina) Lautaro Midón (Bolivia) Juan Carlos Prado Ángelo
November 2	Costa do Sauípe Open; Sauipe, Brazil; Clay – Challenger 125 – 32S/24Q/16D; Singles – Doubles	(Czech Republic) Zdeněk Kolář (Argentina) Santiago Rodríguez Taverna; 6–4, 6–4	(Ecuador) Diego Hidalgo (Argentina) Andrés Molteni	(Argentina) Facundo Díaz Acosta (Peru) Gonzalo Bueno	(Italy) Marco Cecchinato (Brazil) João Lucas Reis da Silva (Argentina) Lautaro Midón (Bolivia) Juan Carlos Prado Ángelo
November 2	Slovak Open; Bratislava, Slovakia; Hard (i) – Challenger 100 – 32S/24Q/16D; Singles – Doubles	(Austria) Jurij Rodionov; 6–2, 6–1	(Switzerland) Jérôme Kym	(Croatia) Matej Dodig (Czech Republic) Dalibor Svrčina	(United States) Nishesh Basavareddy (Serbia) Laslo Djere (Hungary) Zsombor Piros (Belgium) Kimmer Coppejans
November 2	Slovak Open; Bratislava, Slovakia; Hard (i) – Challenger 100 – 32S/24Q/16D; Singles – Doubles	(Slovakia) Miloš Karol (Czech Republic) Andrew Paulson; 7–6^{(7–3)}, 6–3	(Netherlands) Jean-Julien Rojer (United States) Theodore Winegar	(Croatia) Matej Dodig (Czech Republic) Dalibor Svrčina	(United States) Nishesh Basavareddy (Serbia) Laslo Djere (Hungary) Zsombor Piros (Belgium) Kimmer Coppejans
November 2	Santaizi ATP Challenger; Taipei, Taiwan; Hard – Challenger 100 – 32S/24Q/16D; Singles – Doubles	(Japan) Yosuke Watanuki; 7–6^{(7–2)}, 7–5	(Czech Republic) Jan Kumstát	(Hong Kong) Coleman Wong (Japan) Yuta Shimizu	(Thailand) Kasidit Samrej (France) Alexandre Müller (Australia) Omar Jasika (France) Harold Mayot
November 2	Santaizi ATP Challenger; Taipei, Taiwan; Hard – Challenger 100 – 32S/24Q/16D; Singles – Doubles	(New Zealand) Finn Reynolds (New Zealand) James Watt; 6–3, 6–2	(India) Anirudh Chandrasekar (New Zealand) Ajeet Rai	(Hong Kong) Coleman Wong (Japan) Yuta Shimizu	(Thailand) Kasidit Samrej (France) Alexandre Müller (Australia) Omar Jasika (France) Harold Mayot
November 2	Charlottesville Men's Pro Challenger; Charlottesville, United States; Hard (i) – Challenger 75 – 32S/24Q/16D; Singles – Doubles	(United States) Stefan Kozlov; 7–5, 2–6, 7–6^{(7–3)}	(United States) Aidan Mayo	(France) Clément Chidekh (Ecuador) Andy Andrade	(United States) Marcos Giron (United States) Braden Shick (Germany) Max Hans Rehberg (Poland) Maks Kaśnikowski
November 2	Charlottesville Men's Pro Challenger; Charlottesville, United States; Hard (i) – Challenger 75 – 32S/24Q/16D; Singles – Doubles	(Netherlands) Jarno Jans (Belgium) Joran Vliegen; 6–4, 6–4	(United States) Daniel Milavsky (United States) Braden Shick	(France) Clément Chidekh (Ecuador) Andy Andrade	(United States) Marcos Giron (United States) Braden Shick (Germany) Max Hans Rehberg (Poland) Maks Kaśnikowski
November 2	Taranto Tennis Cup; Taranto, Italy; Hard – Challenger 50 – 32S/24Q/16D; Singles – Doubles	(France) Matteo Martineau; 6–3, 6–2	(Switzerland) Kilian Feldbausch	(Italy) Carlo Alberto Caniato (United Kingdom) Felix Gill	(Italy) Francesco Maestrelli (India) Sumit Nagal (United Kingdom) Jay Clarke (Czech Republic) Maxim Mrva
November 2	Taranto Tennis Cup; Taranto, Italy; Hard – Challenger 50 – 32S/24Q/16D; Singles – Doubles	(Tunisia) Skander Mansouri (Austria) Maximilian Neuchrist; 6–4, 7–5	(Spain) Ignasi Forcano (Spain) Rafael Izquierdo Luque	(Italy) Carlo Alberto Caniato (United Kingdom) Felix Gill	(Italy) Francesco Maestrelli (India) Sumit Nagal (United Kingdom) Jay Clarke (Czech Republic) Maxim Mrva
November 2	Challenger de Villa María; Villa María, Argentina; Clay – Challenger 50 – 32S/24Q/16D; Singles – Doubles	(Argentina) Juan Manuel La Serna; 6–2, 6–3	(Argentina) Genaro Alberto Olivieri	(Argentina) Nicolás Kicker (Argentina) Federico Coria	(Argentina) Carlos María Zárate (Spain) Oriol Roca Batalla (Argentina) Juan Pablo Ficovich (Argentina) Juan Bautista Torres
November 2	Challenger de Villa María; Villa María, Argentina; Clay – Challenger 50 – 32S/24Q/16D; Singles – Doubles	(Argentina) Facundo Bagnis (Argentina) Gonzalo Villanueva; Walkover	(Netherlands) Ryan Nijboer (Spain) Oriol Roca Batalla	(Argentina) Nicolás Kicker (Argentina) Federico Coria	(Argentina) Carlos María Zárate (Spain) Oriol Roca Batalla (Argentina) Juan Pablo Ficovich (Argentina) Juan Bautista Torres
November 9	Orléans Open; Orléans, France; Hard (i) – Challenger 125 – 32S/24Q/16D; Singles – Doubles	(Finland) Otto Virtanen; 6–2, 6–3	(United States) Nishesh Basavareddy	(Spain) Pedro Martínez (Germany) Daniel Altmaier	(France) Calvin Hemery (France) Sascha Gueymard Wayenburg (Germany) Tom Gentzsch (Hungary) Zsombor Piros
November 9	Orléans Open; Orléans, France; Hard (i) – Challenger 125 – 32S/24Q/16D; Singles – Doubles	(Switzerland) Jakub Paul (Czech Republic) Matěj Vocel; 7–6^{(7–4)}, 7–6^{(7–5)}	Ivan Liutarevich (Poland) Filip Pieczonka	(Spain) Pedro Martínez (Germany) Daniel Altmaier	(France) Calvin Hemery (France) Sascha Gueymard Wayenburg (Germany) Tom Gentzsch (Hungary) Zsombor Piros
November 9	Knoxville Challenger; Knoxville, United States; Hard (i) – Challenger 75 – 32S/24Q/16D; Singles – Doubles	(France) Clément Chidekh; 6–1, 2–0 ret.	(Jordan) Abdullah Shelbayh	(United States) Daniel Milavsky (United States) Michael Zheng	(United Kingdom) Alastair Gray (Germany) Max Hans Rehberg (Canada) Liam Draxl (United States) Stefan Kozlov
November 9	Knoxville Challenger; Knoxville, United States; Hard (i) – Challenger 75 – 32S/24Q/16D; Singles – Doubles	(Netherlands) Jarno Jans (Belgium) Joran Vliegen; 7–5, 6–3	(Ecuador) Andy Andrade (Denmark) Johannes Ingildsen	(United States) Daniel Milavsky (United States) Michael Zheng	(United Kingdom) Alastair Gray (Germany) Max Hans Rehberg (Canada) Liam Draxl (United States) Stefan Kozlov
November 9	Matsuyama Challenger; Matsuyama, Japan; Hard – Challenger 75 – 32S/24Q/16D; Singles – Doubles	(United Kingdom) Billy Harris; 3–6, 6–1, 7–6^{(8–6)}	(Chinese Taipei) Hsu Yu-hsiou	(Japan) Rei Sakamoto (Japan) Rio Noguchi	(Serbia) Ognjen Milić (Japan) Kaichi Uchida (Japan) Taro Daniel (Japan) Jay Friend
November 9	Matsuyama Challenger; Matsuyama, Japan; Hard – Challenger 75 – 32S/24Q/16D; Singles – Doubles	(New Zealand) Finn Reynolds (New Zealand) James Watt; 6–3, 6–3	(Thailand) Pruchya Isaro (Japan) Yuta Shimizu	(Japan) Rei Sakamoto (Japan) Rio Noguchi	(Serbia) Ognjen Milić (Japan) Kaichi Uchida (Japan) Taro Daniel (Japan) Jay Friend
November 9	Lima Challenger; Lima, Peru; Clay – Challenger 75 – 32S/24Q/16D; Singles – Doubles	(Spain) Nikolás Sánchez Izquierdo; 7–6^{(7–4)}, 7–5	(Uruguay) Franco Roncadelli	(Spain) Max Alcalá Gurri (Brazil) João Lucas Reis da Silva	(Mexico) Alan Magadán (United States) Tristan Boyer (Argentina) Genaro Alberto Olivieri (Colombia) Miguel Tobón
November 9	Lima Challenger; Lima, Peru; Clay – Challenger 75 – 32S/24Q/16D; Singles – Doubles	(Argentina) Facundo Bagnis (Argentina) Facundo Mena; 4–6, 6–4, [10–3]	(Poland) Karol Drzewiecki (Poland) Piotr Matuszewski	(Spain) Max Alcalá Gurri (Brazil) João Lucas Reis da Silva	(Mexico) Alan Magadán (United States) Tristan Boyer (Argentina) Genaro Alberto Olivieri (Colombia) Miguel Tobón
November 9	River City Challenger; Brisbane, Australia; Hard – Challenger 75 – 32S/24Q/16D; Singles – Doubles	(Denmark) August Holmgren; 7–6^{(7–5)}, 6–2	(United States) Christian Langmo	(China) Shang Juncheng (United States) Sebastian Gorzny	(Australia) Dane Sweeny (Japan) Akira Santillan (Australia) Alex Bolt (Australia) Bernard Tomic
November 9	River City Challenger; Brisbane, Australia; Hard – Challenger 75 – 32S/24Q/16D; Singles – Doubles	(Australia) Blake Ellis (Australia) Li Tu; 6–7^{(4–7)}, 6–4, [12–10]	(United States) Alafia Ayeni (Japan) Kokoro Isomura	(China) Shang Juncheng (United States) Sebastian Gorzny	(Australia) Dane Sweeny (Japan) Akira Santillan (Australia) Alex Bolt (Australia) Bernard Tomic
November 9	Crete Challenger III; Hersonissos, Greece; Hard – Challenger 50 – 32S/24Q/16D; Singles – Doubles	(Italy) Michele Ribecai; 4–6, 6–2, 6–0	(South Africa) Philip Henning	(Italy) Francesco Maestrelli (United Kingdom) Henry Searle	(India) Sumit Nagal (Italy) Lorenzo Carboni (Bulgaria) Adrian Andreev (Italy) Massimo Giunta
November 9	Crete Challenger III; Hersonissos, Greece; Hard – Challenger 50 – 32S/24Q/16D; Singles – Doubles	(Greece) Pavlos Tsitsipas (Greece) Petros Tsitsipas; 7–5, 7–6^{(7–4)}	(Bulgaria) Alex Ganchev (Luxembourg) Sacha Maes	(Italy) Francesco Maestrelli (United Kingdom) Henry Searle	(India) Sumit Nagal (Italy) Lorenzo Carboni (Bulgaria) Adrian Andreev (Italy) Massimo Giunta
November 9	Monastir Open; Monastir, Tunisia; Hard – Challenger 50 – 32S/24Q/16D; Singles – Doubles	(Switzerland) Kilian Feldbausch; 6–1, 6–2	(Germany) Marvin Möller	(Czech Republic) Jonáš Forejtek (Spain) Pedro Vives Marcos	(Croatia) Luka Mikrut (Italy) Lorenzo Giustino (Spain) Alejandro Moro Cañas (Germany) Mika Petkovic
November 9	Monastir Open; Monastir, Tunisia; Hard – Challenger 50 – 32S/24Q/16D; Singles – Doubles	(Czech Republic) Filip Duda (Portugal) Tiago Pereira; 7–6^{(7–1)}, 7–6^{(7–2)}	(United Kingdom) James MacKinlay (India) Jeevan Nedunchezhiyan	(Czech Republic) Jonáš Forejtek (Spain) Pedro Vives Marcos	(Croatia) Luka Mikrut (Italy) Lorenzo Giustino (Spain) Alejandro Moro Cañas (Germany) Mika Petkovic
November 16	HPP Open; Helsinki, Finland; Hard (i) – Challenger 125 – 32S/24Q/16D; Singles – Doubles	(United Kingdom) Toby Samuel; 7–6^{(7–3)}, 6–2	(Finland) Otto Virtanen	(United States) Nishesh Basavareddy (Serbia) Laslo Djere	(Lithuania) Edas Butvilas (Czech Republic) Dalibor Svrčina; Svyatoslav Gulin (Norway) Nicolai Budkov Kjær
November 16	HPP Open; Helsinki, Finland; Hard (i) – Challenger 125 – 32S/24Q/16D; Singles – Doubles	(Netherlands) Jean-Julien Rojer (United States) Theodore Winegar; 7–6^{(7–5)}, 6–1	(United Kingdom) Luke Johnson (New Zealand) Michael Venus	(United States) Nishesh Basavareddy (Serbia) Laslo Djere	(Lithuania) Edas Butvilas (Czech Republic) Dalibor Svrčina; Svyatoslav Gulin (Norway) Nicolai Budkov Kjær
November 16	Open Metz–Grand Est; Metz, France; Hard (i) – Challenger 125 – 32S/24Q/16D; Singles – Doubles	(Italy) Francesco Passaro; 6–3, 7–6^{(7–2)}	(South Korea) Kwon Soon-woo	(France) Harold Mayot (France) Sascha Gueymard Wayenburg	(Spain) Iñaki Montes de la Torre (France) Pierre-Hugues Herbert (Croatia) Dino Prižmić (Italy) Luca Nardi
November 16	Open Metz–Grand Est; Metz, France; Hard (i) – Challenger 125 – 32S/24Q/16D; Singles – Doubles	(Spain) Íñigo Cervantes (Spain) Pedro Martínez; 6–4, 6–4	(Ecuador) Gonzalo Escobar (India) Niki Kaliyanda Poonacha	(France) Harold Mayot (France) Sascha Gueymard Wayenburg	(Spain) Iñaki Montes de la Torre (France) Pierre-Hugues Herbert (Croatia) Dino Prižmić (Italy) Luca Nardi
November 16	Uruguay Open; Montevideo, Uruguay; Clay – Challenger 75 – 32S/24Q/16D; Singles – Doubles	(Brazil) Thiago Seyboth Wild; 6–3, 6–4	(Brazil) Matheus Pucinelli de Almeida	(Argentina) Guido Iván Justo (Denmark) Elmer Møller	(Brazil) Felipe Meligeni Alves (Uruguay) Franco Roncadelli (United States) Tristan Boyer (Spain) Oriol Roca Batalla
November 16	Uruguay Open; Montevideo, Uruguay; Clay – Challenger 75 – 32S/24Q/16D; Singles – Doubles	(Colombia) Nicolás Barrientos (Argentina) Mariano Kestelboim; 6–3, 6–2	(Poland) Karol Drzewiecki (Poland) Piotr Matuszewski	(Argentina) Guido Iván Justo (Denmark) Elmer Møller	(Brazil) Felipe Meligeni Alves (Uruguay) Franco Roncadelli (United States) Tristan Boyer (Spain) Oriol Roca Batalla
November 16	Kobe Challenger; Kobe, Japan; Hard (i) – Challenger 75 – 32S/24Q/16D; Singles – Doubles	(Japan) Yosuke Watanuki; 6–3, 6–4	(United Kingdom) Liam Broady	(Japan) Jay Friend (Lebanon) Benjamin Hassan	(Thailand) Kasidit Samrej (China) Zhou Yi (United Kingdom) Billy Harris (Japan) Taro Daniel
November 16	Kobe Challenger; Kobe, Japan; Hard (i) – Challenger 75 – 32S/24Q/16D; Singles – Doubles	(New Zealand) Finn Reynolds (New Zealand) James Watt; 4–6, 7–6^{(7–5)}, [10–6]	(Netherlands) Thijmen Loof (Japan) Kaito Uesugi	(Japan) Jay Friend (Lebanon) Benjamin Hassan	(Thailand) Kasidit Samrej (China) Zhou Yi (United Kingdom) Billy Harris (Japan) Taro Daniel
November 16	Challenger Banque Nationale de Drummondville; Drummondville, Canada; Hard (i) – Challenger 75 – 32S/24Q/16D; Singles – Doubles	(Switzerland) Dylan Dietrich; 6–1, 6–2	(Canada) Liam Draxl	(Japan) James Trotter (France) Clément Chidekh	(United States) Aidan Mayo (United States) Darwin Blanch (Canada) Duncan Chan (United States) Stefan Kozlov
November 16	Challenger Banque Nationale de Drummondville; Drummondville, Canada; Hard (i) – Challenger 75 – 32S/24Q/16D; Singles – Doubles	(Mexico) Miguel Ángel Reyes-Varela (United States) Reese Stalder; 6–3, 6–7^{(4–7)}, [10–7]	(United States) Nathaniel Lammons (Australia) John-Patrick Smith	(Japan) James Trotter (France) Clément Chidekh	(United States) Aidan Mayo (United States) Darwin Blanch (Canada) Duncan Chan (United States) Stefan Kozlov
November 16	NSW Open; Sydney, Australia; Hard – Challenger 75 – 32S/24Q/16D; Singles – Doubles	(United States) Sebastian Gorzny; 6–4, 6–3	(Australia) Omar Jasika	(Australia) Li Tu (Australia) Philip Sekulic	(United States) Christian Langmo (Australia) Tristan Schoolkate (Japan) Hiroki Moriya (Australia) Enzo Aguiard
November 16	NSW Open; Sydney, Australia; Hard – Challenger 75 – 32S/24Q/16D; Singles – Doubles	(Chinese Taipei) Jason Jung (New Zealand) Ajeet Rai; 6–2, 6–2	(Norway) Herman Høyeraal (Australia) Eric Padgham	(Australia) Li Tu (Australia) Philip Sekulic	(United States) Christian Langmo (Australia) Tristan Schoolkate (Japan) Hiroki Moriya (Australia) Enzo Aguiard
November 16	Champaign Challenger; Champaign, United States; Hard (i) – Challenger 50 – 32S/24Q/16D; Singles – Doubles	(United Kingdom) Oliver Tarvet; 6–1, 6–3	(Japan) Shunsuke Mitsui	(United States) Jordan Lee (Slovenia) Bor Artnak	(United Kingdom) Harry Wendelken (United States) Spencer Johnson (United States) Gavin Young (United Kingdom) Lui Maxted
November 16	Champaign Challenger; Champaign, United States; Hard (i) – Challenger 50 – 32S/24Q/16D; Singles – Doubles	(United Kingdom) Tom Hands (United Kingdom) Matthew Summers; 7–6^{(7–4)}, 2–6, [10–5]	(United States) Hunter Heck (Japan) Kenta Miyoshi	(United States) Jordan Lee (Slovenia) Bor Artnak	(United Kingdom) Harry Wendelken (United States) Spencer Johnson (United States) Gavin Young (United Kingdom) Lui Maxted
November 23	Engie Open Florianópolis; Florianópolis, Brazil; Clay – Challenger 75 – 32S/24Q/16D; Singles – Doubles	vs		vs vs	vs vs vs vs
November 23	Engie Open Florianópolis; Florianópolis, Brazil; Clay – Challenger 75 – 32S/24Q/16D; Singles – Doubles	/ vs /		vs vs	vs vs vs vs
November 23	City of Playford Tennis International; Playford, Australia; Hard – Challenger 75 – 32S/24Q/16D; Singles – Doubles	vs		vs vs	vs vs vs vs
November 23	City of Playford Tennis International; Playford, Australia; Hard – Challenger 75 – 32S/24Q/16D; Singles – Doubles	/ vs /		vs vs	vs vs vs vs
November 23	Keio Challenger; Yokohama, Japan; Hard – Challenger 75 – 32S/24Q/16D; Singles – Doubles	vs		vs vs	vs vs vs vs
November 23	Keio Challenger; Yokohama, Japan; Hard – Challenger 75 – 32S/24Q/16D; Singles – Doubles	/ vs /		vs vs	vs vs vs vs
November 23	Ankara Challenger; Ankara, Turkey; Hard (i) – Challenger 50 – 32S/24Q/16D; Singles – Doubles	vs		vs vs	vs vs vs (Turkey) vs
November 23	Ankara Challenger; Ankara, Turkey; Hard (i) – Challenger 50 – 32S/24Q/16D; Singles – Doubles	/ vs /		vs vs	vs vs vs (Turkey) vs
November 23	Crete Challenger IV; Hersonissos, Greece; Hard – Challenger 50 – 32S/24Q/16D; Singles – Doubles	vs		vs vs	vs vs vs vs
November 23	Crete Challenger IV; Hersonissos, Greece; Hard – Challenger 50 – 32S/24Q/16D; Singles – Doubles	/ vs /		vs vs	vs vs vs vs
November 23	Monastir Open II; Monastir, Tunisia; Hard – Challenger 50 – 32S/24Q/16D; Singles – Doubles	vs		vs vs	vs vs vs vs
November 23	Monastir Open II; Monastir, Tunisia; Hard – Challenger 50 – 32S/24Q/16D; Singles – Doubles	/ vs /		vs vs	vs vs vs vs
November 23	El Salvador Open; San Salvador, El Salvador; Hard – Challenger 50 – 32S/24Q/16D; Singles – Doubles	vs		vs vs	vs vs vs vs
November 23	El Salvador Open; San Salvador, El Salvador; Hard – Challenger 50 – 32S/24Q/16D; Singles – Doubles	/ vs /		vs vs	vs vs vs vs
November 30	Challenger Seguros del Estado; Bogotá, Colombia; Clay – Challenger 75 – 32S/24Q/16D; Singles – Doubles	vs		vs vs	vs vs vs vs
November 30	Challenger Seguros del Estado; Bogotá, Colombia; Clay – Challenger 75 – 32S/24Q/16D; Singles – Doubles	/ vs /		vs vs	vs vs vs vs
November 30	Challenger Temuco; Temuco, Chile; Hard – Challenger 75 – 32S/24Q/16D; Singles – Doubles	vs		vs vs	vs vs vs vs
November 30	Challenger Temuco; Temuco, Chile; Hard – Challenger 75 – 32S/24Q/16D; Singles – Doubles	/ vs /		vs vs	vs vs vs vs
November 30	Satul German Open; Chișinău, Moldova; Hard (i) – Challenger 50 – 32S/24Q/16D; Singles – Doubles	vs		vs vs	vs vs vs vs
November 30	Satul German Open; Chișinău, Moldova; Hard (i) – Challenger 50 – 32S/24Q/16D; Singles – Doubles	/ vs /		vs vs	vs vs vs vs
November 30	Crete Challenger V Hersonissos, Greece; Hard – Challenger 50 – 32S/24Q/16D; Singles – Doubles	vs		vs vs	vs vs vs vs
November 30	Crete Challenger V Hersonissos, Greece; Hard – Challenger 50 – 32S/24Q/16D; Singles – Doubles	/ vs /		vs vs	vs vs vs vs
November 30	Soma Bay Open II; Soma Bay, Egypt; Hard – Challenger 50 – 32S/24Q/16D; Singles – Doubles	vs		vs vs	vs vs vs vs
November 30	Soma Bay Open II; Soma Bay, Egypt; Hard – Challenger 50 – 32S/24Q/16D; Singles – Doubles	/ vs /		vs vs	vs vs vs vs
November 30	Trnava Challenger; Trnava, Slovakia; Hard (i) – Challenger 50 – 32S/24Q/16D; Singles – Doubles	vs		vs vs	vs vs vs vs
November 30	Trnava Challenger; Trnava, Slovakia; Hard (i) – Challenger 50 – 32S/24Q/16D; Singles – Doubles	/ vs /		vs vs	vs vs vs vs

=== December ===
Week of	Tournament	Champions	Runners-up	Semifinalists	Quarterfinalists
December 7	Kjøbenhavn Open; Copenhagen, Denmark; Hard (i) – Challenger 50 – 32S/24Q/16D; Singles – Doubles	vs		vs vs	vs vs vs vs
December 7	Kjøbenhavn Open; Copenhagen, Denmark; Hard (i) – Challenger 50 – 32S/24Q/16D; Singles – Doubles	/ vs /		vs vs	vs vs vs vs
December 7	La Paz Open; La Paz, Bolivia; Clay – Challenger 50 – 32S/24Q/16D; Singles – Doubles	vs		vs vs	vs vs vs vs
December 7	La Paz Open; La Paz, Bolivia; Clay – Challenger 50 – 32S/24Q/16D; Singles – Doubles	/ vs /		vs vs	vs vs vs vs
December 7	Monastir Open III; Monastir, Tunisia; Hard – Challenger 50 – 32S/24Q/16D; Singles – Doubles	vs		vs vs	vs vs vs vs
December 7	Monastir Open III; Monastir, Tunisia; Hard – Challenger 50 – 32S/24Q/16D; Singles – Doubles	/ vs /		vs vs	vs vs vs vs
December 7	Nonthaburi Challenger III; Nonthaburi, Thailand; Hard – Challenger 50 – 32S/24Q/16D; Singles – Doubles	vs		vs vs	vs vs vs vs
December 7	Nonthaburi Challenger III; Nonthaburi, Thailand; Hard – Challenger 50 – 32S/24Q/16D; Singles – Doubles	/ vs /		vs vs	vs vs vs vs
December 7	Corcovado Tennis Open; Rio de Janeiro, Brazil; Clay – Challenger 50 – 32S/24Q/16D; Singles – Doubles	vs		vs vs	vs vs vs vs
December 7	Corcovado Tennis Open; Rio de Janeiro, Brazil; Clay – Challenger 50 – 32S/24Q/16D; Singles – Doubles	/ vs /		vs vs	vs vs vs vs
December 7	Trnava Challenger II; Trnava, Slovakia; Hard (i) – Challenger 50 – 32S/24Q/16D; Singles – Doubles	vs		vs vs	vs vs vs vs
December 7	Trnava Challenger II; Trnava, Slovakia; Hard (i) – Challenger 50 – 32S/24Q/16D; Singles – Doubles	/ vs /		vs vs	vs vs vs vs
December 14	Blumenau Challenger; Blumenau, Brazil; Clay – Challenger 50 – 32S/24Q/16D; Singles – Doubles	vs		vs vs	vs vs vs vs
December 14	Blumenau Challenger; Blumenau, Brazil; Clay – Challenger 50 – 32S/24Q/16D; Singles – Doubles	/ vs /		vs vs	vs vs vs vs
December 14	A-Rete Park Challenger; Guanzate, Italy; Hard (i) – Challenger 50 – 32S/24Q/16D; Singles – Doubles	vs		vs vs	vs vs vs vs
December 14	A-Rete Park Challenger; Guanzate, Italy; Hard (i) – Challenger 50 – 32S/24Q/16D; Singles – Doubles	/ vs /		vs vs	vs vs vs vs
December 14	La Paz Open II; La Paz, Bolivia; Clay – Challenger 50 – 32S/24Q/16D; Singles – Doubles	vs		vs vs	vs vs vs vs
December 14	La Paz Open II; La Paz, Bolivia; Clay – Challenger 50 – 32S/24Q/16D; Singles – Doubles	/ vs /		vs vs	vs vs vs vs
December 14	Nonthaburi Challenger IV; Nonthaburi, Thailand; Hard – Challenger 50 – 32S/24Q/16D; Singles – Doubles	vs		vs vs	vs vs vs vs
December 14	Nonthaburi Challenger IV; Nonthaburi, Thailand; Hard – Challenger 50 – 32S/24Q/16D; Singles – Doubles	/ vs /		vs vs	vs vs vs vs

== Cancelled tournaments ==
The following tournaments were formally announced by the ATP before being cancelled.

Week of	Tournament
March 2	Fujairah Open; Fujairah, United Arab Emirates; Hard – Challenger 50
March 9	Fujairah Open II; Fujairah, United Arab Emirates; Hard – Challenger 50
March 23	Girona Challenger; Girona, Spain; Clay – Challenger 100
April 13	Yucatán Open; Mérida, Mexico; Clay – Challenger 75
June 22	Durham Challenger; Durham, United States; Hard – Challenger 50
July 27	Centurion Challenger III; Centurion, South Africa; Hard – Challenger 50
August 3	Centurion Challenger IV; Centurion, South Africa; Hard – Challenger 75
August 17	Tashkent Challenger; Tashkent, Uzbekistan; Hard – Challenger 50
August 31	Manta Open; Manta, Ecuador; Hard – Challenger 75
October 19	Torrevieja Challenger; Alicante, Spain; Hard – Challenger 75
October 26	Gaborone Challenger; Gaborone, Botswana; Hard – Challenger 50
December 14	Nova Lima Tennis Open; Nova Lima, Brazil; Clay – Challenger 50

== Statistical information ==
These tables present the number of singles (S) and doubles (D) titles won by each player and each nation during the season. The players/nations are sorted by: 1) total number of titles (a doubles title won by two players representing the same nation counts as only one win for the nation); 2) a singles > doubles hierarchy; 3) alphabetical order (by family names for players).

The ATP announced in March 2022 that players representing Russia or Belarus would not be able to compete under their respective country's flag due to the 2022 Russian invasion of Ukraine. These players competed under no nationality, and any titles won by these players weren't counted towards a country's tally of total titles.

=== Titles won by player ===
Total	Player	S	D	S	D
10	Mariano Kestelboim (ARG)		● ● ● ● ● ● ● ● ● ●	0	10
9	Andrew Paulson (CZE)		● ● ● ● ● ● ● ● ●	0	9
8	Jarno Jans (NED)		● ● ● ● ● ● ● ●	0	8
8	Niki Kaliyanda Poonacha (IND)		● ● ● ● ● ● ● ●	0	8
7	Miloš Karol (SVK)		● ● ● ● ● ● ●	0	7
6	Facundo Díaz Acosta (ARG)	● ● ● ● ● ●		6	0
6	Mili Poljičak (CRO)	●	● ● ● ● ●	1	5
6	Gonzalo Escobar (ECU)		● ● ● ● ● ●	0	6
6	Stefan Latinović (SRB)		● ● ● ● ● ●	0	6
6	Nam Ji-sung (KOR)		● ● ● ● ● ●	0	6
6	Finn Reynolds (NZL)		● ● ● ● ● ●	0	6
6	Nino Serdarušić (CRO)		● ● ● ● ● ●	0	6
6	Kaito Uesugi (JPN)		● ● ● ● ● ●	0	6
6	Joran Vliegen (BEL)		● ● ● ● ● ●	0	6
6	James Watt (NZL)		● ● ● ● ● ●	0	6
5	Thiago Seyboth Wild (BRA)	● ● ● ● ●		5	0
5	Sriram Balaji (IND)		● ● ● ● ●	0	5
5	Admir Kalender (CRO)		● ● ● ● ●	0	5
5	Neil Oberleitner (AUT)		● ● ● ● ●	0	5
5	Jakub Paul (SUI)		● ● ● ● ●	0	5
5	Tiago Pereira (POR)		● ● ● ● ●	0	5
5	David Stevenson (GBR)		● ● ● ● ●	0	5
5	Niels Visker (NED)		● ● ● ● ●	0	5
5	Theodore Winegar (USA)		● ● ● ● ●	0	5
5	Marcelo Zormann (BRA)		● ● ● ● ●	0	5
4	Max Alcalá Gurri (ESP)	● ● ● ●		4	0
4	Clément Chidekh (FRA)	● ● ● ●		4	0
4	Lloyd Harris (RSA)	● ● ● ●		4	0
4	Zsombor Piros (HUN)	● ● ● ●		4	0
4	Toby Samuel (GBR)	● ● ● ●		4	0
4	Ilia Simakin	● ● ● ●		4	0
4	Luca Van Assche (FRA)	● ● ● ●		4	0
4	Henrique Rocha (POR)	● ● ●	●	3	1
4	Filippo Romano (ITA)	●	● ● ●	1	3
4	Matías Soto (CHI)	●	● ● ●	1	3
4	Nicolás Barrientos (COL)		● ● ● ●	0	4
4	Filip Duda (CZE)		● ● ● ●	0	4
4	Tom Hands (GBR)		● ● ● ●	0	4
4	Diego Hidalgo (ECU)		● ● ● ●	0	4
4	Thijmen Loof (NED)		● ● ● ●	0	4
4	Sergio Martos Gornés (ESP)		● ● ● ●	0	4
4	Patrik Niklas-Salminen (FIN)		● ● ● ●	0	4
4	Filip Pieczonka (POL)		● ● ● ●	0	4
4	Arthur Reymond (FRA)		● ● ● ●	0	4
4	Eduardo Ribeiro (BRA)		● ● ● ●	0	4
4	Santiago Rodríguez Taverna (ARG)		● ● ● ●	0	4
4	Luca Sanchez (FRA)		● ● ● ●	0	4
4	Matthew Summers (GBR)		● ● ● ●	0	4
4	Matěj Vocel (CZE)		● ● ● ●	0	4
4	Szymon Walków (POL)		● ● ● ●	0	4
3	Jan Choinski (GBR)	● ● ●		3	0
3	Hugo Dellien (BOL)	● ● ●		3	0
3	Dylan Dietrich (SUI)	● ● ●		3	0
3	Pavel Kotov	● ● ●		3	0
3	Jan Kumstát (CZE)	● ● ●		3	0
3	Kwon Soon-woo (KOR)	● ● ●		3	0
3	Francesco Passaro (ITA)	● ● ●		3	0
3	Chris Rodesch (LUX)	● ● ●		3	0
3	Nikolás Sánchez Izquierdo (ESP)	● ● ●		3	0
3	Gianluca Cadenasso (ITA)	● ●	●	2	1
3	Gustavo Heide (BRA)	● ●	●	2	1
3	Juan Manuel La Serna (ARG)	● ●	●	2	1
3	Sebastian Ofner (AUT)	● ●	●	2	1
3	Joel Schwärzler (AUT)	● ●	●	2	1
3	Facundo Mena (ARG)	●	● ●	1	2
3	Constantin Bittoun Kouzmine (FRA)		● ● ●	0	3
3	Íñigo Cervantes (ESP)		● ● ●	0	3
3	Jake Delaney (AUS)		● ● ●	0	3
3	Alexander Donski (BUL)		● ● ●	0	3
3	Francesco Forti (ITA)		● ● ●	0	3
3	Sander Gillé (BEL)		● ● ●	0	3
3	Erik Grevelius (SWE)		● ● ●	0	3
3	Cleeve Harper (CAN)		● ● ●	0	3
3	Adam Heinonen (SWE)		● ● ●	0	3
3	Pruchya Isaro (THA)		● ● ●	0	3
3	Jason Jung (TPE)		● ● ●	0	3
3	Mac Kiger (USA)		● ● ●	0	3
3	Benjamin Kittay (USA)		● ● ●	0	3
3	Ivan Liutarevich		● ● ●	0	3
3	Maximilian Neuchrist (AUT)		● ● ●	0	3
3	Oleksandr Ovcharenko (UKR)		● ● ●	0	3
3	Karl Poling (USA)		● ● ●	0	3
3	David Poljak (CZE)		● ● ●	0	3
3	Ryan Seggerman (USA)		● ● ●	0	3
3	Reese Stalder (USA)		● ● ●	0	3
3	JJ Tracy (USA)		● ● ●	0	3
3	Sem Verbeek (NED)		● ● ●	0	3
3	Kai Wehnelt (GER)		● ● ●	0	3
3	Benjamín Winter López (ESP)		● ● ●	0	3
3	Federico Zeballos (BOL)		● ● ●	0	3
3	Zheng Baoluo (CHN)		● ● ●	0	3
2	Nishesh Basavareddy (USA)	● ●		2	0
2	Mika Brunold (SUI)	● ●		2	0
2	Bu Yunchaokete (CHN)	● ●		2	0
2	Raphaël Collignon (BEL)	● ●		2	0
2	Laslo Djere (SRB)	● ●		2	0
2	Matej Dodig (CRO)	● ●		2	0
2	Titouan Droguet (FRA)	● ●		2	0
2	Kilian Feldbausch (SUI)	● ●		2	0
2	Borna Gojo (CRO)	● ●		2	0
2	David Jordà Sanchis (ESP)	● ●		2	0
2	Guido Iván Justo (ARG)	● ●		2	0
2	Nicolás Mejía (COL)	● ●		2	0
2	Lukas Neumayer (AUT)	● ●		2	0
2	Rio Noguchi (JPN)	● ●		2	0
2	Gauthier Onclin (BEL)	● ●		2	0
2	Matheus Pucinelli de Almeida (BRA)	● ●		2	0
2	Roman Safiullin	● ●		2	0
2	Stefanos Sakellaridis (GRE)	● ●		2	0
2	Henry Searle (GBR)	● ●		2	0
2	Colton Smith (USA)	● ●		2	0
2	Oliver Tarvet (GBR)	● ●		2	0
2	Camilo Ugo Carabelli (ARG)	● ●		2	0
2	Daniel Vallejo (PAR)	● ●		2	0
2	Yosuke Watanuki (JPN)	● ●		2	0
2	Stefan Dostanic (USA)	●	●	1	1
2	Pedro Martínez (ESP)	●	●	1	1
2	Luka Pavlovic (FRA)	●	●	1	1
2	Tristan Schoolkate (AUS)	●	●	1	1
2	Braden Shick (USA)	●	●	1	1
2	Keegan Smith (USA)	●	●	1	1
2	Sun Fajing (CHN)	●	●	1	1
2	Romain Arneodo (MON)		● ●	0	2
2	Alafia Ayeni (USA)		● ●	0	2
2	Arda Azkara (TUR)		● ●	0	2
2	Facundo Bagnis (ARG)		● ●	0	2
2	Siddhant Banthia (IND)		● ●	0	2
2	Blake Bayldon (AUS)		● ●	0	2
2	Ignacio Carou (URU)		● ●	0	2
2	Hernán Casanova (ARG)		● ●	0	2
2	Anirudh Chandrasekar (IND)		● ●	0	2
2	S D Prajwal Dev (IND)		● ●	0	2
2	Michael Geerts (BEL)		● ●	0	2
2	George Goldhoff (USA)		● ●	0	2
2	Mats Hermans (NED)		● ●	0	2
2	Trey Hilderbrand (USA)		● ●	0	2
2	Max Houkes (NED)		● ●	0	2
2	Alexandru Jecan (ROU)		● ●	0	2
2	Ben Jones (GBR)		● ●	0	2
2	Zdeněk Kolář (CZE)		● ●	0	2
2	Pranav Kumar (USA)		● ●	0	2
2	Younes Lalami (MAR)		● ●	0	2
2	Nathaniel Lammons (USA)		● ●	0	2
2	Mario Mansilla Díez (ESP)		● ●	0	2
2	Igor Marcondes (BRA)		● ●	0	2
2	Guto Miguel (BRA)		● ●	0	2
2	Luís Felipe Miguel (BRA)		● ●	0	2
2	Denys Molchanov (UKR)		● ●	0	2
2	Christopher Papa (USA)		● ●	0	2
2	Park Ui-sung (KOR)		● ●	0	2
2	Marc Polmans (AUS)		● ●	0	2
2	Ajeet Rai (NZL)		● ●	0	2
2	Ramkumar Ramanathan (IND)		● ●	0	2
2	Jean-Julien Rojer (NED)		● ●	0	2
2	Alejo Sánchez Quílez (ESP)		● ●	0	2
2	Akira Santillan (JPN)		● ●	0	2
2	Paulo André Saraiva dos Santos (BRA)		● ●	0	2
2	Patrik Trhac (USA)		● ●	0	2
2	David Vega Hernández (ESP)		● ●	0	2
2	Michael Vrbenský (CZE)		● ●	0	2
2	Jackson Withrow (USA)		● ●	0	2
2	Takeru Yuzuki (JPN)		● ●	0	2
1	Franco Agamenone (ITA)	●		1	0
1	Luciano Emanuel Ambrogi (ARG)	●		1	0
1	Matteo Arnaldi (ITA)	●		1	0
1	Térence Atmane (FRA)	●		1	0
1	Sebastián Báez (ARG)	●		1	0
1	Felix Balshaw (FRA)	●		1	0
1	Petr Bar Biryukov	●		1	0
1	Alex Barrena (ARG)	●		1	0
1	Max Basing (GBR)	●		1	0
1	Mattia Bellucci (ITA)	●		1	0
1	Darwin Blanch (USA)	●		1	0
1	Alexander Blockx (BEL)	●		1	0
1	Tristan Boyer (USA)	●		1	0
1	Raúl Brancaccio (ITA)	●		1	0
1	Liam Broady (GBR)	●		1	0
1	Jenson Brooksby (USA)	●		1	0
1	Florian Broska (GER)	●		1	0
1	Román Andrés Burruchaga (ARG)	●		1	0
1	Edas Butvilas (LTU)	●		1	0
1	Carlo Alberto Caniato (ITA)	●		1	0
1	Pablo Carreño Busta (ESP)	●		1	0
1	Juan Manuel Cerúndolo (ARG)	●		1	0
1	Federico Cinà (ITA)	●		1	0
1	Cezar Crețu (ROU)	●		1	0
1	Taro Daniel (JPN)	●		1	0
1	Jesper de Jong (NED)	●		1	0
1	Gabriel Debru (FRA)	●		1	0
1	Diego Dedura (GER)	●		1	0
1	Yaroslav Demin	●		1	0
1	Guy den Ouden (NED)	●		1	0
1	James Duckworth (AUS)	●		1	0
1	Damir Džumhur (BIH)	●		1	0
1	Jacob Fearnley (GBR)	●		1	0
1	Frederico Ferreira Silva (POR)	●		1	0
1	Sergey Fomin (UZB)	●		1	0
1	Buvaysar Gadamauri (BEL)	●		1	0
1	Arthur Géa (FRA)	●		1	0
1	Tom Gentzsch (GER)	●		1	0
1	Sebastian Gorzny (USA)	●		1	0
1	Andrea Guerrieri (ITA)	●		1	0
1	Sascha Gueymard Wayenburg (FRA)	●		1	0
1	Nick Hardt (DOM)	●		1	0
1	Billy Harris (GBR)	●		1	0
1	Calvin Hemery (FRA)	●		1	0
1	Philip Henning (RSA)	●		1	0
1	August Holmgren (DEN)	●		1	0
1	Hubert Hurkacz (POL)	●		1	0
1	Giles Hussey (GBR)	●		1	0
1	Ilya Ivashka	●		1	0
1	Kyrian Jacquet (FRA)	●		1	0
1	Alibek Kachmazov	●		1	0
1	Miomir Kecmanović (SRB)	●		1	0
1	Moïse Kouamé (FRA)	●		1	0
1	Stefan Kozlov (USA)	●		1	0
1	Georgii Kravchenko (UKR)	●		1	0
1	Pablo Llamas Ruiz (ESP)	●		1	0
1	George Loffhagen (GBR)	●		1	0
1	Pol Martín Tiffon (ESP)	●		1	0
1	Matteo Martineau (FRA)	●		1	0
1	Hayato Matsuoka (JPN)	●		1	0
1	Aidan Mayo (USA)	●		1	0
1	Hamad Medjedovic (SRB)	●		1	0
1	Daniel Mérida (ESP)	●		1	0
1	Alex Michelsen (USA)	●		1	0
1	Luka Mikrut (CRO)	●		1	0
1	Michael Mmoh (USA)	●		1	0
1	Marvin Möller (GER)	●		1	0
1	Iñaki Montes de la Torre (ESP)	●		1	0
1	Maxim Mrva (CZE)	●		1	0
1	Sumit Nagal (IND)	●		1	0
1	Emilio Nava (USA)	●		1	0
1	Mariano Navone (ARG)	●		1	0
1	Christopher O'Connell (AUS)	●		1	0
1	Genaro Alberto Olivieri (ARG)	●		1	0
1	Samuele Pieri (ITA)	●		1	0
1	Gabriele Piraino (ITA)	●		1	0
1	Lucas Poullain (FRA)	●		1	0
1	Oleg Prihodko (UKR)	●		1	0
1	Ethan Quinn (USA)	●		1	0
1	João Lucas Reis da Silva (BRA)	●		1	0
1	Michele Ribecai (ITA)	●		1	0
1	Leandro Riedi (SUI)	●		1	0
1	Alexander Ritschard (SUI)	●		1	0
1	Jurij Rodionov (AUT)	●		1	0
1	Franco Roncadelli (URU)	●		1	0
1	Valentin Royer (FRA)	●		1	0
1	Marat Sharipov	●		1	0
1	Dominic Stricker (SUI)	●		1	0
1	Zachary Svajda (USA)	●		1	0
1	Dane Sweeny (AUS)	●		1	0
1	Alejandro Tabilo (CHI)	●		1	0
1	Clément Tabur (FRA)	●		1	0
1	Bernard Tomic (AUS)	●		1	0
1	Stefano Travaglia (ITA)	●		1	0
1	Marco Trungelliti (ARG)	●		1	0
1	Otto Virtanen (FIN)	●		1	0
1	Aleksandar Vukic (AUS)	●		1	0
1	Adam Walton (AUS)	●		1	0
1	J. J. Wolf (USA)	●		1	0
1	Coleman Wong (HKG)	●		1	0
1	Wu Yibing (CHN)	●		1	0
1	Zhang Zhizhen (CHN)	●		1	0
1	Valerio Aboian (ARG)		●	0	1
1	Dan Added (FRA)		●	0	1
1	Joaquín Aguilar Cardozo (URU)		●	0	1
1	Nicolás Álvarez Varona (ESP)		●	0	1
1	Andy Andrade (ECU)		●	0	1
1	Sander Arends (NED)		●	0	1
1	Boris Arias (BOL)		●	0	1
1	Alberto Barroso Campos (ESP)		●	0	1
1	Hynek Bartoň (CZE)		●	0	1
1	Finn Bass (GBR)		●	0	1
1	Ariel Behar (URU)		●	0	1
1	Jacopo Berrettini (ITA)		●	0	1
1	Sergey Betov		●	0	1
1	Rithvik Choudary Bollipalli (IND)		●	0	1
1	Charles Broom (GBR)		●	0	1
1	Brandon Carpico (USA)		●	0	1
1	Robert Cash (USA)		●	0	1
1	Joshua Charlton (AUS)		●	0	1
1	Keshav Chopra (USA)		●	0	1
1	Jay Clarke (GBR)		●	0	1
1	Tibo Colson (BEL)		●	0	1
1	Kimmer Coppejans (BEL)		●	0	1
1	Daniel Cukierman (ISR)		●	0	1
1	Martin Damm (USA)		●	0	1
1	Daniel de Jonge (NED)		●	0	1
1	Santiago de la Fuente (ARG)		●	0	1
1	Jesse Delaney (AUS)		●	0	1
1	Marcelo Demoliner (BRA)		●	0	1
1	Karol Drzewiecki (POL)		●	0	1
1	Tuncay Duran (TUR)		●	0	1
1	Blake Ellis (AUS)		●	0	1
1	Jaime Faria (POR)		●	0	1
1	Nikita Samuel Filin (USA)		●	0	1
1	Constantin Frantzen (GER)		●	0	1
1	Jay Friend (JPN)		●	0	1
1	Anthony Genov (BUL)		●	0	1
1	Federico Agustín Gómez (ARG)		●	0	1
1	Juan Sebastián Gómez (COL)		●	0	1
1	Santiago González (MEX)		●	0	1
1	Robin Haase (NED)		●	0	1
1	Hans Hach Verdugo (MEX)		●	0	1
1	Benjamin Hassan (LBN)		●	0	1
1	Ray Ho (TPE)		●	0	1
1	Jeffrey Hsu (TPE)		●	0	1
1	Arklon Huertas del Pino (PER)		●	0	1
1	Conner Huertas del Pino (PER)		●	0	1
1	Taisei Ichikawa (JPN)		●	0	1
1	Masamichi Imamura (JPN)		●	0	1
1	Johannes Ingildsen (DEN)		●	0	1
1	Hendrik Jebens (GER)		●	0	1
1	Arjun Kadhe (IND)		●	0	1
1	Adil Kalyanpur (IND)		●	0	1
1	Szymon Kielan (POL)		●	0	1
1	Cannon Kingsley (USA)		●	0	1
1	Stian Klaassen (NED)		●	0	1
1	Yusuke Kusuhara (JPN)		●	0	1
1	João Victor Couto Loureiro (BRA)		●	0	1
1	Orlando Luz (BRA)		●	0	1
1	James MacKinlay (GBR)		●	0	1
1	Jody Maginley (ATG)		●	0	1
1	Skander Mansouri (TUN)		●	0	1
1	Daniel Masur (GER)		●	0	1
1	Rafael Matos (BRA)		●	0	1
1	Piotr Matuszewski (POL)		●	0	1
1	Daniel Milavsky (USA)		●	0	1
1	Saketh Myneni (IND)		●	0	1
1	Shunsuke Nakagawa (JPN)		●	0	1
1	Christoph Negritu (GER)		●	0	1
1	Petr Nouza (CZE)		●	0	1
1	Jannik Opitz (GER)		●	0	1
1	Joshua Paris (GBR)		●	0	1
1	Bogdan Pavel (ROU)		●	0	1
1	Albert Pedrico Kravtsov (ESP)		●	0	1
1	Brandon Pérez (VEN)		●	0	1
1	Oskar Brostrøm Poulsen (DEN)		●	0	1
1	Juan Carlos Prado Ángelo (BOL)		●	0	1
1	Vijay Sundar Prashanth (IND)		●	0	1
1	Dominik Reček (CZE)		●	0	1
1	Max Hans Rehberg (GER)		●	0	1
1	Miguel Ángel Reyes-Varela (MEX)		●	0	1
1	Franco Ribero (ARG)		●	0	1
1	Fernando Romboli (BRA)		●	0	1
1	Alex Rybakov (USA)		●	0	1
1	Vitaliy Sachko (UKR)		●	0	1
1	Mukund Sasikumar (IND)		●	0	1
1	Joshua Sheehy (USA)		●	0	1
1	Abdullah Shelbayh (JOR)		●	0	1
1	Daniel Siniakov (CZE)		●	0	1
1	Adrià Soriano Barrera (COL)		●	0	1
1	Bart Stevens (NED)		●	0	1
1	Robert Strombachs (LAT)		●	0	1
1	Billy Suarez (USA)		●	0	1
1	James Trotter (JPN)		●	0	1
1	Pavlos Tsitsipas (GRE)		●	0	1
1	Petros Tsitsipas (GRE)		●	0	1
1	Li Tu (AUS)		●	0	1
1	Gonzalo Villanueva (ARG)		●	0	1
1	Marcus Willis (GBR)		●	0	1
1	Max Wiskandt (GER)		●	0	1
1	Cooper Woestendick (USA)		●	0	1
1	Wu Tung-lin (TPE)		●	0	1

=== Titles won by nation ===
Total	Nation	S	D
54	United States (USA)	19	35
41	Argentina (ARG)	21	20
32	France (FRA)	23	9
31	Great Britain (GBR)	17	14
30	Spain (ESP)	15	15
28	Czech Republic (CZE)	4	24
27	Netherlands (NED)	2	25
25	Brazil (BRA)	10	15
23	India (IND)	1	22
22	Italy (ITA)	17	5
19	Belgium (BEL)	6	13
19	Japan (JPN)	6	13
17	Austria (AUT)	7	10
17	Croatia (CRO)	6	11
15	Switzerland (SUI)	10	5
14	Australia (AUS)	7	7
13	Germany (GER)	4	9
11	Poland (POL)	1	10
11	Ecuador (ECU)	0	11
10	Portugal (POR)	4	6
10	Serbia (SRB)	4	6
9	China (CHN)	5	4
9	South Korea (KOR)	3	6
8	Bolivia (BOL)	3	5
8	Colombia (COL)	2	6
8	Ukraine (UKR)	2	6
8	New Zealand (NZL)	0	8
7	Slovakia (SVK)	0	7
6	Chinese Taipei (TPE)	0	6
5	South Africa (RSA)	5	0
5	Chile (CHI)	2	3
5	Finland (FIN)	1	4
5	Uruguay (URU)	1	4
4	Hungary (HUN)	4	0
4	Bulgaria (BUL)	0	4
3	Luxembourg (LUX)	3	0
3	Greece (GRE)	2	1
3	Denmark (DEN)	1	2
3	Romania (ROU)	1	2
3	Canada (CAN)	0	3
3	Mexico (MEX)	0	3
3	Sweden (SWE)	0	3
3	Thailand (THA)	0	3
2	Paraguay (PAR)	2	0
2	Monaco (MON)	0	2
2	Morocco (MAR)	0	2
2	Turkey (TUR)	0	2
1	Bosnia and Herzegovina (BIH)	1	0
1	Dominican Republic (DOM)	1	0
1	Hong Kong (HKG)	1	0
1	Lithuania (LTU)	1	0
1	Uzbekistan (UZB)	1	0
1	Antigua and Barbuda (ATG)	0	1
1	Israel (ISR)	0	1
1	Jordan (JOR)	0	1
1	Latvia (LAT)	0	1
1	Lebanon (LBN)	0	1
1	Peru (PER)	0	1
1	Tunisia (TUN)	0	1
1	Venezuela (VEN)	0	1

== Point distribution ==
Points are awarded as follows:

Tournament category	Singles									Doubles				
Tournament category	W	F	SF	QF	R16	R32	Q	Q2	Q1	W	F	SF	QF	R16
Challenger 175	175	90	50	25	13	0	6	3	0	175	100	60	32	0
Challenger 125	125	64	35	16	8	0	5	3	0	125	75	45	25	0
Challenger 100	100	50	25	14	7	0	4	2	0	100	60	36	20	0
Challenger 75	75	44	22	12	6	0	4	2	0	75	50	30	16	0
Challenger 50	50	25	14	8	4	0	3	1	0	50	30	17	9	0
