= 2026 Phan Thiết Challenger – Doubles =

Doubles
- 2026 Phan Thiết Challenger

Final
- Champions: (Japan) James Trotter (Japan) Kaito Uesugi
- Runners-up: (United States) George Goldhoff (United States) Reese Stalder
- Score: 6–3, 5–7, [10–4]

Events
Singles	Doubles
- Phan Thiết Challenger

This was the first edition of the tournament.

James Trotter and Kaito Uesugi won the title after defeating George Goldhoff and Reese Stalder 6–3, 5–7, [10–4] in the final.

== Seeds ==
1. (United States) George Goldhoff / (United States) Reese Stalder (final)
2. (India) Jeevan Nedunchezhiyan / (India) Ramkumar Ramanathan (first round)
3. (South Korea) Nam Ji-sung / (South Korea) Park Ui-sung (quarterfinals)
4. (Australia) Joshua Charlton / (Australia) Jake Delaney (semifinals)

== Draw ==
Key

- Q = Qualifier
- WC = Wild card
- LL = Lucky loser
- Alt = Alternate
- ITF = ITF entry
- PR = Protected ranking
- SR = Special ranking
- SE = Special exempt
- JE = Junior exempt
- JR = Junior Accelerator Programme entrant
- CO = College Accelerator Programme entrant
- NG = Next Gen Accelerator Program entrant
- w/o = Walkover
- r = Retired
- d = Defaulted

First round
1	(United States) G Goldhoff (United States) R Stalder	7	7
(Australia) Ethan Cook (Australia) K Pearson	5	5
(France) G Jacq (Tunisia) S Mansouri	6	3	[6]
(Japan) M Imamura (Japan) N Tajima	3	6	[10]
4	(Australia) J Charlton (Australia) Ja Delaney	6^{4}	6	[12]
Alt	P Bar Biryukov; I Simakin	7^{7}	3	[10]
(Netherlands) T Loof; M Sharipov	4	6	[7]
(India) A Kalyanpur (China) F Sun	6	3	[10]
Alt	(France) C Denolly (Ukraine) V Orlov	3	3
(Japan) J Trotter (Japan) K Uesugi	6	6
WC	(Vietnam) Nguyễn Minh Phát (Vietnam) Trần Quốc Cường	2	0
3	(South Korea) J-s Nam (South Korea) U-s Park	6	6
(France) L Pavlovic (Greece) S Sakellaridis	5	0^{r}
(Philippines) FC Alcantara (Zimbabwe) CJ Lock	7	0
(China) A Wang (China) Y Zhou	1	6	[10]
2	(India) J Nedunchezhiyan (India) R Ramanathan	6	4	[7]

Quarterfinals
1	(United States) G Goldhoff (United States) R Stalder	6^{3}	7	[10]
(Japan) M Imamura (Japan) N Tajima	7^{7}	5	[8]
4	(Australia) J Charlton (Australia) Ja Delaney	6	6
(India) A Kalyanpur (China) F Sun	3	4
(Japan) J Trotter (Japan) K Uesugi	6^{4}	6	[10]
3	(South Korea) J-s Nam (South Korea) U-s Park	7^{7}	4	[4]
(Philippines) FC Alcantara (Zimbabwe) CJ Lock	7^{8}	4	[3]
(China) A Wang (China) Y Zhou	6^{6}	6	[10]

Semifinals
1	(United States) G Goldhoff (United States) R Stalder	6^{7}	6	[10]
4	(Australia) J Charlton (Australia) Ja Delaney	7^{9}	4	[7]
(Japan) J Trotter (Japan) K Uesugi	6	6
(China) A Wang (China) Y Zhou	3	4

Final
1	(United States) G Goldhoff (United States) R Stalder	3	7	[4]
(Japan) J Trotter (Japan) K Uesugi	6	5	[10]
