= 2026 Phan Thiết Challenger III – Doubles =

Doubles
- 2026 Phan Thiết Challenger III

Final
- Champions: (France) Constantin Bittoun Kouzmine (India) S D Prajwal Dev
- Runners-up: (Japan) Yamato Sueoka (Japan) Naoki Tajima
- Score: 6–1, 7–6^{(7–0)}

Events
Singles	Doubles
- Phan Thiết Challenger

Nam Ji-sung and Park Ui-sung were the defending champions but chose not to defend their title.

Constantin Bittoun Kouzmine and S D Prajwal Dev won the title after defeating Yamato Sueoka and Naoki Tajima 6–1, 7–6^{(7–0)} in the final.

== Seeds ==
1. (France) Constantin Bittoun Kouzmine / (India) S D Prajwal Dev (champions)
2. (Australia) Ethan Cook / (Australia) Tai Sach (first round)
3. (Chinese Taipei) Jeffrey Hsu / (China) Zheng Baoluo (quarterfinals)
4. (Japan) Yamato Sueoka / (Japan) Naoki Tajima (final)

== Draw ==
Key

- Q = Qualifier
- WC = Wild card
- LL = Lucky loser
- Alt = Alternate
- ITF = ITF entry
- PR = Protected ranking
- SR = Special ranking
- SE = Special exempt
- JE = Junior exempt
- JR = Junior Accelerator Programme entrant
- CO = College Accelerator Programme entrant
- NG = Next Gen Accelerator Program entrant
- w/o = Walkover
- r = Retired
- d = Defaulted

First round
1	(France) C Bittoun Kouzmine (India) SDP Dev	6	4	[10]
Alt	Martin Borisiouk; Timofei Derepasko	2	6	[5]
(Australia) B Ellis (Japan) Y Shimizu	6	6
WC	(Vietnam) Trần Quốc Cường (Vietnam) Trương Thành Minh	0	0
3	(Chinese Taipei) J Hsu (China) B Zheng	7^{7}	6
(Philippines) FC Alcantara (United States) C Papa	6^{3}	3
(France) F Bax (France) A Weber	7^{7}	6^{2}	[4]
PR	(Japan) T Ichikawa (South Korea) Jeong Yeong-seok	6^{2}	7^{7}	[10]
WC	(Vietnam) Nguyễn Minh Phát (Australia) M Purcell	3	5
(Japan) Kenta Miyoshi (Mexico) R Pacheco Méndez	6	7
(Spain) Sergio Callejón Hernando (Thailand) M Jones	3	3
4	(Japan) Yamato Sueoka (Japan) N Tajima	6	6
Alt	(Australia) Benjamin O'Connell (Australia) Sam Ryan Ziegann	7^{7}	3	[10]
(Kazakhstan) G Lomakin (Estonia) K Tamm	6^{3}	6	[5]
Nikita Ianin (India) Atharva Sharma	6	6
2	(Australia) Ethan Cook (Australia) Tai Sach	4	2

Quarterfinals
1	(France) C Bittoun Kouzmine (India) SDP Dev	6	6
(Australia) B Ellis (Japan) Y Shimizu	4	3
3	(Chinese Taipei) J Hsu (China) B Zheng	4	4
PR	(Japan) T Ichikawa (South Korea) Y-s Jeong	6	6
(Japan) K Miyoshi (Mexico) R Pacheco Méndez	4	4
4	(Japan) Y Sueoka (Japan) N Tajima	6	6
Alt	(Australia) B O'Connell (Australia) S Ryan Ziegann	4	4
N Ianin (India) A Sharma	6	6

Semifinals
1	(France) C Bittoun Kouzmine (India) SDP Dev	7	4	[13]
PR	(Japan) T Ichikawa (South Korea) Y-s Jeong	5	6	[11]
4	(Japan) Y Sueoka (Japan) N Tajima	4	7^{8}	[10]
N Ianin (India) A Sharma	6	6^{6}	[6]

Final
1	(France) C Bittoun Kouzmine (India) SDP Dev	6	7^{7}
4	(Japan) Y Sueoka (Japan) N Tajima	1	6^{0}
