= 2026 Wuning Challenger – Doubles =

Doubles
- 2026 Wuning Challenger

Final
- Champions: (Australia) Joshua Charlton (United Kingdom) Ben Jones
- Runners-up: (Belgium) Buvaysar Gadamauri (United Kingdom) Giles Hussey
- Score: 6–4, 6–2

Events
Singles	Doubles
- Wuning Challenger

This was the first edition of the tournament.

Joshua Charlton and Ben Jones won the title after defeating Buvaysar Gadamauri and Giles Hussey 6–4, 6–2 in the final.

== Seeds ==
1. (South Korea) Park Ui-sung / (Australia) Kody Pearson (semifinals)
2. (Australia) Joshua Charlton / (United Kingdom) Ben Jones (champions)
3. (Australia) Ethan Cook / (Australia) Tai Sach (quarterfinals)
4. (Canada) Justin Boulais / (United Kingdom) Harry Wendelken (first round)

== Draw ==
Key

- Q = Qualifier
- WC = Wild card
- LL = Lucky loser
- Alt = Alternate
- ITF = ITF entry
- PR = Protected ranking
- SR = Special ranking
- SE = Special exempt
- JE = Junior exempt
- JR = Junior Accelerator Programme entrant
- CO = College Accelerator Programme entrant
- NG = Next Gen Accelerator Program entrant
- w/o = Walkover
- r = Retired
- d = Defaulted

First round
1	(South Korea) U-s Park (Australia) K Pearson	3	6	[10]
Alt	(Japan) Yuki Mochizuki (Japan) Y Takahashi	6	3	[4]
(Philippines) FC Alcantara (Thailand) M Jones	6	6
WC	(China) Chen Xianfeng (China) Zhao Zhao	4	4
4	(Canada) J Boulais (United Kingdom) H Wendelken	4	4
(Belgium) B Gadamauri (United Kingdom) G Hussey	6	6
(United States) B Shick (United States) K Smith	4	6	[1]
(Australia) O Jasika (Australia) L Tu	6	2	[10]
S Betov; D Ostapenkov	6	5	[10]
(Japan) N Tajima (Japan) K Uchida	1	7	[2]
WC	(China) J Cui (China) Sun Qian	4	6^{5}
3	(Australia) Ethan Cook (Australia) Tai Sach	6	7^{7}
(Italy) A Binda; I Simakin	6	3	[8]
(Chinese Taipei) C-p Hsieh (China) F Sun	3	6	[10]
(Uzbekistan) S Fomin (Japan) Ryuki Matsuda	6^{7}	0
2	(Australia) J Charlton (United Kingdom) B Jones	7^{9}	6

Quarterfinals
1	(South Korea) U-s Park (Australia) K Pearson	3	7^{7}	[10]
(Philippines) FC Alcantara (Thailand) M Jones	6	6^{5}	[6]
(Belgium) B Gadamauri (United Kingdom) G Hussey	6	6
(Australia) O Jasika (Australia) L Tu	4	3
S Betov; D Ostapenkov	6	6
3	(Australia) E Cook (Australia) T Sach	3	3
(Chinese Taipei) C-p Hsieh (China) F Sun	2	3
2	(Australia) J Charlton (United Kingdom) B Jones	6	6

Semifinals
1	(South Korea) U-s Park (Australia) K Pearson	3	2
(Belgium) B Gadamauri (United Kingdom) G Hussey	6	6
S Betov; D Ostapenkov	4	6	[7]
2	(Australia) J Charlton (United Kingdom) B Jones	6	3	[10]

Final
(Belgium) B Gadamauri (United Kingdom) G Hussey	4	2
2	(Australia) J Charlton (United Kingdom) B Jones	6	6
