= 2026 Wuning Challenger =

- Date: 6 – 12 April
- Edition: 1st
- Surface: Hard
- Location: Wuning, China

Champions

Singles
- Pavel Kotov

Doubles
- (Australia) Joshua Charlton / (United Kingdom) Ben Jones
- Wuning Challenger

The 2026 Wuning Open was a professional tennis tournament played on hardcourts. It was the first edition of the tournament which was part of the 2026 ATP Challenger Tour. It took place in Wuning, China between 6 and 12 April 2026.

== Singles main-draw entrants ==
=== Seeds ===
Country	Player	Rank^{1}	Seed
FRA	Clément Chidekh	181	1
	Ilia Simakin	220	2
CHN	Zhou Yi	223	3
JPN	Kaichi Uchida	235	4
CHN	Sun Fajing	252	5
GBR	Harry Wendelken	259	6
JPN	Yasutaka Uchiyama	276	7
	Pavel Kotov	298	8

- ^{1} Rankings are as of 30 March 2026.

=== Other entrants ===
The following players received wildcards into the singles main draw:

- (China) Sun Qian
- (China) ~~Te Rigele~~
- (China) Zhao Zhao

The following player received entry into the singles main draw as an alternate:

- (Poland) Filip Peliwo

The following players received entry from the qualifying draw:

- (Australia) Ethan Cook
- (Denmark) August Holmgren
- (Australia) Pavle Marinkov
- Daniil Ostapenkov
- (Australia) Kody Pearson
- (Australia) Philip Sekulic

The following player received entry as a lucky loser:

- (Japan) Yuki Mochizuki

== Champions ==
=== Singles ===
- Pavel Kotov def. (United Kingdom) Harry Wendelken 4–6, 6–3, 6–4.

=== Doubles ===
- (Australia) Joshua Charlton / (United Kingdom) Ben Jones def. (Belgium) Buvaysar Gadamauri / (United Kingdom) Giles Hussey 6–4, 6–2.
