= 2026 Wuning Challenger II – Doubles =

Doubles
- 2026 Wuning Challenger II

Final
- Champions: (Chinese Taipei) Jason Jung (Japan) Kaito Uesugi
- Runners-up: (United States) Keegan Smith (China) Zheng Baoluo
- Score: 6–7^{(3–7)}, 6–3, [10–6]

Events
Singles	Doubles
- Wuning Challenger

Joshua Charlton and Ben Jones were the defending champions but only Charlton chose to defend his title, partnering Alastair Gray. They lost in the first round to Hsieh Cheng-peng and Sun Fajing.

Jason Jung and Kaito Uesugi won the title after defeating Keegan Smith and Zheng Baoluo 6–7^{(3–7)}, 6–3, [10–6] in the final.

== Seeds ==
1. (Chinese Taipei) Jason Jung / (Japan) Kaito Uesugi (champions)
2. (India) S D Prajwal Dev / (China) Wang Aoran (first round)
3. (Japan) Yusuke Kusuhara / (Japan) Shunsuke Nakagawa (first round)
4. (Australia) Ethan Cook / (Australia) Tai Sach (semifinals)

== Draw ==
Key

- Q = Qualifier
- WC = Wild card
- LL = Lucky loser
- Alt = Alternate
- ITF = ITF entry
- PR = Protected ranking
- SR = Special ranking
- SE = Special exempt
- JE = Junior exempt
- JR = Junior Accelerator Programme entrant
- CO = College Accelerator Programme entrant
- NG = Next Gen Accelerator Program entrant
- w/o = Walkover
- r = Retired
- d = Defaulted

First round
1	(Chinese Taipei) J Jung (Japan) K Uesugi	6	6
WC	(China) J Cui (China) Sun Qian	4	4
(Chinese Taipei) C-p Hsieh (China) F Sun	7^{9}	4	[10]
(Australia) J Charlton (United Kingdom) A Gray	6^{7}	6	[7]
4	(Australia) Ethan Cook (Australia) Tai Sach	6	7
(Japan) K Isomura (Japan) Ryuki Matsuda	4	5
(Belgium) B Gadamauri (United Kingdom) G Hussey	7	6
(Philippines) FC Alcantara (Thailand) M Jones	5	3
(Japan) Sora Fukuda (Japan) Leo Vithoontien	6	6
(Japan) M Imamura (Japan) N Tajima	4	3
(Republic of Ireland) C Barry (United Kingdom) C Broom	6	6
3	(Japan) Y Kusuhara (Japan) S Nakagawa	3	4
WC	(China) Pan Weiwen (China) Zhao Zhao	6^{5}	6	[6]
(United States) K Smith (China) B Zheng	7^{7}	4	[10]
S Betov; D Ostapenkov	7^{7}	4	[10]
2	(India) SDP Dev (China) A Wang	6^{5}	6	[4]

Quarterfinals
1	(Chinese Taipei) J Jung (Japan) K Uesugi	6	7
(Chinese Taipei) C-p Hsieh (China) F Sun	3	5
4	(Australia) E Cook (Australia) T Sach	w/o
(Belgium) B Gadamauri (United Kingdom) G Hussey
(Japan) S Fukuda (Japan) L Vithoontien	w/o
(Republic of Ireland) C Barry (United Kingdom) C Broom
(United States) K Smith (China) B Zheng	6	6
S Betov; D Ostapenkov	2	4

Semifinals
1	(Chinese Taipei) J Jung (Japan) K Uesugi	7	6
4	(Australia) E Cook (Australia) T Sach	5	3
(Japan) S Fukuda (Japan) L Vithoontien	4	6^{3}
(United States) K Smith (China) B Zheng	6	7^{7}

Final
1	(Chinese Taipei) J Jung (Japan) K Uesugi	6^{3}	6	[10]
(United States) K Smith (China) B Zheng	7^{7}	3	[6]
