= 2026 Wuning Challenger III – Doubles =

Doubles
- 2026 Wuning Challenger III

Final
- Champions: (Japan) Akira Santillan (China) Zheng Baoluo
- Runners-up: Yaroslav Demin; Timofei Derepasko
- Score: 3–6, 6–3, [10–4]

Events
Singles	Doubles
- Wuning Challenger

Jason Jung and Kaito Uesugi were the defending champions but chose not to defend their title.

Akira Santillan and Zheng Baoluo won the title after defeating Yaroslav Demin and Timofei Derepasko 3–6, 6–3, [10–4] in the final.

== Seeds ==
1. (India) Siddhant Banthia / (New Zealand) Ajeet Rai (quarterfinals)
2. (Australia) Blake Bayldon / (Australia) Calum Puttergill (first round)
3. Sergey Betov / (Chinese Taipei) Hsieh Cheng-peng (quarterfinals)
4. (Japan) Masamichi Imamura / (Japan) Naoki Tajima (first round)

== Draw ==
Key

- Q = Qualifier
- WC = Wild card
- LL = Lucky loser
- Alt = Alternate
- ITF = ITF entry
- PR = Protected ranking
- SR = Special ranking
- SE = Special exempt
- JE = Junior exempt
- JR = Junior Accelerator Programme entrant
- CO = College Accelerator Programme entrant
- NG = Next Gen Accelerator Program entrant
- w/o = Walkover
- r = Retired
- d = Defaulted

First round
1	(India) S Banthia (New Zealand) A Rai	6	7
(Malaysia) Mitsuki Wei Kang Leong (Japan) Hikaru Shiraishi	4	5
(Japan) J Friend (Japan) Yamato Sueoka	6	6^{5}	[10]
(Japan) T Ichikawa (Japan) Ryuki Matsuda	4	7^{7}	[5]
4	(Japan) M Imamura (Japan) N Tajima	5	6^{5}
Y Demin; Timofei Derepasko	7	7^{7}
(Uzbekistan) S Fomin (Kazakhstan) G Lomakin	6	6
Semen Pankin (Kazakhstan) B Zhukayev	3	2
WC	(United States) R Seggerman (China) Wang Zicong	w/o
(Australia) O Jasika (Australia) M Purcell
(Japan) Kosuke Ogura (Japan) Keisuke Saitoh	3	4
3	S Betov (Chinese Taipei) C-p Hsieh	6	6
(Switzerland) L Castelnuovo (Chinese Taipei) J Hsu
(Estonia) K Tamm (China) A Wang	w/o
(Japan) A Santillan (China) B Zheng	6^{4}	6	[10]
2	(Australia) B Bayldon (Australia) C Puttergill	7^{7}	4	[5]

Quarterfinals
1	(India) S Banthia (New Zealand) A Rai	3	4
(Japan) J Friend (Japan) Y Sueoka	6	6
Y Demin; T Derepasko	6	7^{7}
(Uzbekistan) S Fomin (Kazakhstan) G Lomakin	4	6^{3}
WC	(United States) R Seggerman (China) Z Wang	6	6
3	S Betov (Chinese Taipei) C-p Hsieh	3	4
(Estonia) K Tamm (China) A Wang	6^{5}	6	[7]
(Japan) A Santillan (China) B Zheng	7^{7}	3	[10]

Semifinals
(Japan) J Friend (Japan) Y Sueoka	4	4
Y Demin; T Derepasko	6	6
WC	(United States) R Seggerman (China) Z Wang	6^{3}	5
(Japan) A Santillan (China) B Zheng	7^{7}	7

Final
Y Demin; T Derepasko	6	3	[4]
(Japan) A Santillan (China) B Zheng	3	6	[10]
