= 2026 Phan Thiết Challenger – Singles =

Singles
- 2026 Phan Thiết Challenger

Final
- Champion: (South Korea) Kwon Soon-woo
- Runner-up: Ilia Simakin
- Score: 6–2, 7–6^{(7–5)}

Events
Singles	Doubles
- Phan Thiết Challenger

This is the first edition of the tournament.

Kwon Soon-woo won the title after defeating Ilia Simakin 6–2, 7–6^{(7–5)} in the final.

== Seeds ==
1. (Japan) Yosuke Watanuki (first round)
2. (Croatia) Luka Mikrut (first round)
3. (Kazakhstan) Timofey Skatov (second round)
4. (United Kingdom) Oliver Crawford (first round)
5. (Belgium) Gilles-Arnaud Bailly (first round)
6. (France) Luka Pavlovic (first round)
7. (United Kingdom) Ryan Peniston (first round)
8. (Chinese Taipei) Hsu Yu-hsiou (first round)

== Draw ==
Key

- Q = Qualifier
- WC = Wild card
- LL = Lucky loser
- Alt = Alternate
- ITF = ITF entry
- PR = Protected ranking
- SR = Special ranking
- SE = Special exempt
- JE = Junior exempt
- JR = Junior Accelerator Programme entrant
- CO = College Accelerator Programme entrant
- NG = Next Gen Accelerator Program entrant
- w/o = Walkover
- r = Retired
- d = Defaulted

=== Finals ===
Semifinals
Ilia Simakin	6^{6}	6	6
(Poland) Daniel Michalski	7^{8}	1	3
WC	(France) Lilian Marmousez	0	1^{r}
Q	(South Korea) Kwon Soon-woo	6	2

Final
Ilia Simakin	2	6^{5}
Q	(South Korea) Kwon Soon-woo	6	7^{7}

=== Top half ===
First round
1	(Japan) Y Watanuki	6	3	5
(Australia) O Jasika	2	6	7
(Spain) P Martín Tiffon	6	3	5
I Simakin	2	6	7
(France) R Bertrand	7	5
(Croatia) M Dodig	5	2^{r}
Q	(South Korea) H Chung	6	6
7	(United Kingdom) R Peniston	4	4
4	(United Kingdom) O Crawford	4	3
(Italy) F Cinà	6	6
(Japan) K Uchida	6	3	3
(Poland) D Michalski	3	6	6
(Greece) S Sakellaridis	6^{9}	3
Q	(Italy) M Ribecai	7^{11}	6
(United States) Dar Blanch	6	3	6
8	(Chinese Taipei) Y-h Hsu	2	6	2

Second round
(Australia) O Jasika	3	0
I Simakin	6	6
(France) R Bertrand	6^{4}	7^{7}	6
Q	(South Korea) H Chung	7^{7}	6^{3}	2
(Italy) F Cinà	2	4
(Poland) D Michalski	6	6
Q	(Italy) M Ribecai	4	7^{11}	1
(United States) Dar Blanch	6	6^{9}	6

Quarterfinals
I Simakin	7^{7}	5	6
(France) R Bertrand	6^{3}	7	4
(Poland) D Michalski	5	7^{7}	6
(United States) Dar Blanch	7	6^{3}	3

Semifinals
I Simakin	6^{6}	6	6
(Poland) D Michalski	7^{8}	1	3

=== Bottom half ===
First round
6	(France) L Pavlovic	2	2
Q	(Czech Republic) M Gengel	6	6
P Bar Biryukov	6	6
(China) F Sun	4	3
WC	(France) Lilian Marmousez	7^{7}	6^{3}	6
(Japan) J Trotter	6^{5}	7^{7}	4
M Sharipov	7^{9}	6^{5}	4^{r}
3	(Kazakhstan) T Skatov	6^{7}	7^{7}	4
5	(Belgium) GA Bailly	6	1	4
Q	(Germany) MH Rehberg	3	6	6
Q	(France) A Weber	6	6
WC	(Vietnam) Vũ Hà Minh Đức	0	0
Q	(South Korea) S-w Kwon	6	6
(China) Y Zhou	2	2
WC	(Germany) Nikolai Barsukov	3	6	7^{7}
2	(Croatia) L Mikrut	6	2	6^{4}

Second round
Q	(Czech Republic) M Gengel	4	6	5
P Bar Biryukov	6	3	7
WC	(France) L Marmousez	6	6
3	(Kazakhstan) T Skatov	4	4
Q	(Germany) MH Rehberg	6	6
Q	(France) A Weber	3	1
Q	(South Korea) S-w Kwon	6	6
WC	(Germany) N Barsukov	1	1

Quarterfinals
P Bar Biryukov	3	1
WC	(France) L Marmousez	6	6
Q	(Germany) MH Rehberg	2	6^{2}
Q	(South Korea) S-w Kwon	6	7^{7}

Semifinals
WC	(France) L Marmousez	0	1^{r}
Q	(South Korea) S-w Kwon	6	2
