= 2026 Phan Thiết Challenger IV – Doubles =

Doubles
- 2026 Phan Thiết Challenger IV

Final
- Champions: (France) Constantin Bittoun Kouzmine (India) S D Prajwal Dev
- Runners-up: (Australia) Joshua Charlton (Japan) Yuta Shimizu
- Score: 6–4, 7–6^{(7–1)}

Events
| Singles | Doubles |
- Phan Thiết Challenger

Constantin Bittoun Kouzmine and S D Prajwal Dev were the defending champions and successfully defended their title after defeating Joshua Charlton and Yuta Shimizu 6–4, 7–6^{(7–1)} in the final.

== Seeds ==
1. (Australia) Joshua Charlton / (Japan) Yuta Shimizu (final)
2. (France) Constantin Bittoun Kouzmine / (India) S D Prajwal Dev (champions)
3. (Australia) Ethan Cook / (Australia) Tai Sach (first round)
4. (Japan) Taisei Ichikawa / (Japan) Masamichi Imamura (semifinals)

== Draw ==
Key

- Q = Qualifier
- WC = Wild card
- LL = Lucky loser
- Alt = Alternate
- ITF = ITF entry
- PR = Protected ranking
- SR = Special ranking
- SE = Special exempt
- JE = Junior exempt
- JR = Junior Accelerator Programme entrant
- CO = College Accelerator Programme entrant
- NG = Next Gen Accelerator Program entrant
- w/o = Walkover
- r = Retired
- d = Defaulted

First round
1 | (Australia) J Charlton (Japan) Y Shimizu | 6 | 6
WC | (Vietnam) Nguyễn Minh Phát (Vietnam) Trần Quốc Cường | 0 | 1
(Japan) Tomohiro Masabayashi (Thailand) T Suksumrarn | 6 | 6
WC | (Vietnam) Trương Thành Minh (Vietnam) Vũ Hà Minh Đức | 1 | 3
4 | (Japan) T Ichikawa (Japan) M Imamura | 6 | 6
(Ukraine) Yurii Dzhavakian (India) Aditya Vishal Balsekar | 2 | 1
(Philippines) FC Alcantara (United States) C Papa | 4 | 3
(United States) Hunter Heck (Japan) Kenta Miyoshi | 6 | 6
E Agafonov; I Simakin | 6 | 3 | [5]
Alt | Martin Borisiouk; Nikita Ianin | 3 | 6 | [10]
PR | (South Korea) Jeong Yeong-seok (Japan) Koki Matsuda | 6 | 6^{11} | [10]
3 | (Australia) Ethan Cook (Australia) Tai Sach | 4 | 7^{13} | [6]
Timofei Derepasko (Kazakhstan) G Lomakin | 3 | 3
(Japan) Ryuki Matsuda (India) Atharva Sharma | 6 | 6
(Japan) Yamato Sueoka (Japan) N Tajima | 3 | 4
2 | (France) C Bittoun Kouzmine (India) SDP Dev | 6 | 6

Quarterfinals
1 | (Australia) J Charlton (Japan) Y Shimizu | 6 | 6
(Japan) T Masabayashi (Thailand) T Suksumrarn | 3 | 2
4 | (Japan) T Ichikawa (Japan) M Imamura | 7^{7} | 4 | [10]
(United States) H Heck (Japan) K Miyoshi | 6^{4} | 6 | [5]
Alt | M Borisiouk; N Ianin | 6^{3} | 3
PR | (South Korea) Y-s Jeong (Japan) K Matsuda | 7^{7} | 6
(Japan) R Matsuda (India) A Sharma | 4 | 2
2 | (France) C Bittoun Kouzmine (India) SDP Dev | 6 | 6

Semifinals
1 | (Australia) J Charlton (Japan) Y Shimizu | 7 | 6
4 | (Japan) T Ichikawa (Japan) M Imamura | 5 | 2
PR | (South Korea) Y-s Jeong (Japan) K Matsuda | 3 | 1
2 | (France) C Bittoun Kouzmine (India) SDP Dev | 6 | 6

Final
1 | (Australia) J Charlton (Japan) Y Shimizu | 4 | 6^{1}
2 | (France) C Bittoun Kouzmine (India) SDP Dev | 6 | 7^{7}
