= 2026 Wuning Challenger – Singles =

Singles
- 2026 Wuning Challenger

Final
- Champion: Pavel Kotov
- Runner-up: (United Kingdom) Harry Wendelken
- Score: 4–6, 6–3, 6–4

Events
Singles	Doubles
- Wuning Challenger

This was the first edition of the tournament.

Pavel Kotov won the title after defeating Harry Wendelken 4–6, 6–3, 6–4 in the final.

== Seeds ==
1. (France) Clément Chidekh (quarterfinals)
2. Ilia Simakin (quarterfinals)
3. (China) Zhou Yi (second round)
4. (Japan) Kaichi Uchida (second round)
5. (China) Sun Fajing (semifinals)
6. (United Kingdom) Harry Wendelken (final)
7. (Japan) Yasutaka Uchiyama (first round, retired)
8. Pavel Kotov (champion)

== Draw ==
Key

- Q = Qualifier
- WC = Wild card
- LL = Lucky loser
- Alt = Alternate
- ITF = ITF entry
- PR = Protected ranking
- SR = Special ranking
- SE = Special exempt
- JE = Junior exempt
- JR = Junior Accelerator Programme entrant
- CO = College Accelerator Programme entrant
- NG = Next Gen Accelerator Program entrant
- w/o = Walkover
- r = Retired
- d = Defaulted

=== Finals ===
Semifinals
6	(United Kingdom) Harry Wendelken	6	6
(Australia) Li Tu	2	2
5	(China) Sun Fajing	6^{9}	6	3
8	Pavel Kotov	7^{11}	3	6

Final
6	(United Kingdom) Harry Wendelken	6	3	4
8	Pavel Kotov	4	6	6

=== Top half ===
First round
1	(France) C Chidekh	6	6
LL	(Japan) Yuki Mochizuki	4	1
(Belgium) B Gadamauri	6	6
(Australia) O Jasika	3	3
(Uzbekistan) S Fomin	6	1	7^{7}
(Australia) M Bouzige	4	6	6^{3}
Alt	(Poland) F Peliwo	3	6^{8}
6	(United Kingdom) H Wendelken	6	7^{10}
3	(China) Y Zhou	6	6
(United Kingdom) G Hussey	3	4
Q	(Australia) K Pearson	6^{7}	6	6
WC	(China) Zhao Zhao	7^{9}	4	4
Q	(Australia) Pavle Marinkov	2	3
(Australia) L Tu	6	6
(United Kingdom) A Gray	6	4
7	(Japan) Y Uchiyama	3	3^{r}

Second round
1	(France) C Chidekh	6	6
(Belgium) B Gadamauri	4	1
(Uzbekistan) S Fomin	5	2
6	(United Kingdom) H Wendelken	7	6
3	(China) Y Zhou	4	4
Q	(Australia) K Pearson	6	6
(Australia) L Tu	6	6
(United Kingdom) A Gray	4	4

Quarterfinals
1	(France) C Chidekh	4	4
6	(United Kingdom) H Wendelken	6	6
Q	(Australia) K Pearson	6^{2}	4
(Australia) L Tu	7^{7}	6

Semifinals
6	(United Kingdom) H Wendelken	6	6
(Australia) L Tu	2	2

=== Bottom half ===
First round
5	(China) F Sun	7	6
Q	(Australia) Ethan Cook	5	4
(Thailand) M Jones	2	7^{8}	6^{5}
Q	(Australia) P Sekulic	6	6^{6}	7^{7}
(Australia) B Ellis	6^{5}	2^{r}
(Canada) J Boulais	7^{7}	2
(Italy) A Binda	2	6^{5}
4	(Japan) K Uchida	6	7^{7}
8	P Kotov	6	6
(United States) K Smith	4	4
(China) J Cui	6^{3}	6^{3}
Q	(Denmark) A Holmgren	7^{7}	7^{7}
Q	D Ostapenkov	7^{7}	6
WC	(China) Sun Qian	6^{3}	4
(France) T Paris	7^{7}	3	4
2	I Simakin	6^{3}	6	6

Second round
5	(China) F Sun	7^{7}	6
Q	(Australia) P Sekulic	6^{2}	3
(Canada) J Boulais	6	6
4	(Japan) K Uchida	3	4
8	P Kotov	6	7^{8}
Q	(Denmark) A Holmgren	4	6^{6}
Q	D Ostapenkov	3	3
2	I Simakin	6	6

Quarterfinals
5	(China) F Sun	6	6
(Canada) J Boulais	1	1
8	P Kotov	2	7^{7}	6
2	I Simakin	6	6^{5}	3

Semifinals
5	(China) F Sun	6^{9}	6	3
8	P Kotov	7^{11}	3	6
