= 2026 Phan Thiết Challenger IV – Singles =

Singles
- 2026 Phan Thiết Challenger IV

Final
- Champion: Ilia Simakin
- Runner-up: (Mexico) Rodrigo Pacheco Méndez
- Score: 6–7^{(4–7)}, 6–4, 6–3

Events
Singles	Doubles
- Phan Thiết Challenger

Ilia Simakin was the two-time defending champion and successfully defended his title after defeating Rodrigo Pacheco Méndez 6–7^{(4–7)}, 6–4, 6–3 in the final.

== Seeds ==
1. (France) Moïse Kouamé (semifinals)
2. (France) Luka Pavlovic (second round)
3. (Mexico) Rodrigo Pacheco Méndez (final)
4. Ilia Simakin (champion)
5. (Australia) Matthew Dellavedova (quarterfinals)
6. (France) Florent Bax (quarterfinals)
7. (Australia) Philip Sekulic (quarterfinals)
8. (Australia) Cruz Hewitt (quarterfinals)

== Draw ==
Key

- Q = Qualifier
- WC = Wild card
- LL = Lucky loser
- Alt = Alternate
- ITF = ITF entry
- PR = Protected ranking
- SR = Special ranking
- SE = Special exempt
- JE = Junior exempt
- JR = Junior Accelerator Programme entrant
- CO = College Accelerator Programme entrant
- NG = Next Gen Accelerator Program entrant
- w/o = Walkover
- r = Retired
- d = Defaulted

=== Finals ===
Semifinals
1	(France) Moïse Kouamé	6	3	4
3	(Mexico) Rodrigo Pacheco Méndez	2	6	6
4	Ilia Simakin	6^{7}	7	6
Q	(United States) Hunter Heck	7^{9}	5	2

Final
3	(Mexico) Rodrigo Pacheco Méndez	7^{7}	4	3
4	Ilia Simakin	6^{4}	6	6

=== Top half ===
First round
1	(France) M Kouamé	6	6
Q	(Japan) Ryuki Matsuda	1	3
Q	(Poland) F Peliwo	1	6	6
(Australia) Tai Sach	6	3	4
(Czech Republic) D Palán	7	2	5
Q	Martin Borisiouk	5	6	7
WC	(Vietnam) Trương Thành Minh	4	3
6	(France) F Bax	6	6
3	(Mexico) R Pacheco Méndez	6	7
(Spain) Sergio Callejón Hernando	3	5
(France) A Weber	6	6
(Japan) Koki Matsuda	1	2
(Australia) M Bouzige	4	4
(Japan) Kenta Miyoshi	6	6
(Japan) Y Shimizu	2	6	5
7	(Australia) P Sekulic	6	2	7

Second round
1	(France) M Kouamé	6	4
Q	(Poland) F Peliwo	1	2^{r}
Q	M Borisiouk	3	6^{3}
6	(France) F Bax	6	7^{7}
3	(Mexico) R Pacheco Méndez	6	6
(France) A Weber	4	2
(Japan) K Miyoshi	7^{7}	6^{5}	3
7	(Australia) P Sekulic	6^{5}	7^{7}	6

Quarterfinals
1	(France) M Kouamé	6	6
6	(France) F Bax	4	2
3	(Mexico) R Pacheco Méndez	6	6
7	(Australia) P Sekulic	4	4

Semifinals
1	(France) M Kouamé	6	3	4
3	(Mexico) R Pacheco Méndez	2	6	6

=== Bottom half ===
First round
8	(Australia) C Hewitt	7	6
(India) Digvijaypratap Singh	5	4
(France) C Bittoun Kouzmine	6	6
WC	(Australia) Benjamin O'Connell	2	4
(Australia) B Ellis	6	5	6
(Japan) H Moriya	4	7	3
Q	Timofei Derepasko	4	3
4	I Simakin	6	6
5	(Australia) Matthew Dellavedova	4	6	6
Q	(Kazakhstan) G Lomakin	6	3	3
(Japan) M Imamura	3	2
(Australia) Enzo Aguiard	6	6
(Uzbekistan) K Sultanov	3	2
Q	(United States) Hunter Heck	6	6
WC	(Vietnam) Vũ Hà Minh Đức	5	3
2	(France) L Pavlovic	7	6

Second round
8	(Australia) C Hewitt	7	6
(France) C Bittoun Kouzmine	5	2
(Australia) B Ellis	4	2
4	I Simakin	6	6
5	(Australia) M Dellavedova	6	6
(Australia) E Aguiard	3	1
Q	(United States) H Heck	3	6	7^{8}
2	(France) L Pavlovic	6	1	6^{6}

Quarterfinals
8	(Australia) C Hewitt	3	1
4	I Simakin	6	6
5	(Australia) M Dellavedova	4	2
Q	(United States) H Heck	6	6

Semifinals
4	I Simakin	6^{7}	7	6
Q	(United States) H Heck	7^{9}	5	2
