= 2026 ENKA Open – Singles =

Singles
- 2026 ENKA Open

Final
- Champion: (France) Lucas Poullain
- Runner-up: Ilia Simakin
- Score: 5–7, 6–2, 6–3

Events
Singles	Doubles
- ENKA Open

This was the first edition of the tournament.

Lucas Poullain won the title after defeating Ilia Simakin 5–7, 6–2, 6–3 in the final.

== Seeds ==
1. (France) Dan Added (first round)
2. (France) Florent Bax (quarterfinals)
3. (United Kingdom) Max Basing (quarterfinals, retired)
4. Petr Bar Biryukov (first round, retired)
5. (Turkey) Yankı Erel (second round, retired)
6. (Japan) Akira Santillan (second round)
7. Ilia Simakin (final)
8. (Turkey) Mert Alkaya (second round)

== Draw ==
Key

- Q = Qualifier
- WC = Wild card
- LL = Lucky loser
- Alt = Alternate
- ITF = ITF entry
- PR = Protected ranking
- SR = Special ranking
- SE = Special exempt
- JE = Junior exempt
- JR = Junior Accelerator Programme entrant
- CO = College Accelerator Programme entrant
- NG = Next Gen Accelerator Program entrant
- w/o = Walkover
- r = Retired
- d = Defaulted

=== Finals ===
Semifinals
(France) Lucas Poullain	6	6
PR	(Netherlands) Gijs Brouwer	1	0
(France) Antoine Ghibaudo	6^{5}	6^{2}
7	Ilia Simakin	7^{7}	7^{7}

Final
(France) Lucas Poullain	5	6	6
7	Ilia Simakin	7	2	3

=== Top half ===
First round
1	(France) D Added	4	1
(France) L Poullain	6	6
Q	(Italy) A Binda	7^{7}	6
WC	(Turkey) MN Türker	6^{5}	2
Q	(Japan) Kenta Miyoshi	6	7^{7}
WC	(Turkey) A Azkara	3	6^{0}
Q	(Georgia (country)) S Purtseladze	6^{2}	4
8	(Turkey) Mert Alkaya	7^{7}	6
4	P Bar Biryukov	6^{4}	1^{r}
CO	(France) Paul Inchauspé	7^{7}	0
Q	(Japan) Koki Matsuda	3	6	7^{7}
Q	(Turkey) Kerem Yılmaz	6	3	6^{4}
PR	(Netherlands) G Brouwer	4	6	6
(India) M Dhamne	6	0	4
Alt	(Kazakhstan) D Yevseyev	4	6	1
5	(Turkey) Y Erel	6	4	6

Second round
(France) L Poullain	7	7
Q	(Italy) A Binda	5	5
Q	(Japan) K Miyoshi	6	6
8	(Turkey) M Alkaya	3	2
CO	(France) P Inchauspé	4	6	4
Q	(Japan) K Matsuda	6	4	6
PR	(Netherlands) G Brouwer	4
5	(Turkey) Y Erel	1^{r}

Quarterfinals
(France) L Poullain	6^{3}	6	6
Q	(Japan) K Miyoshi	7^{7}	1	4
Q	(Japan) K Matsuda	4	6	2
PR	(Netherlands) G Brouwer	6	1	6

Semifinals
(France) L Poullain	6	6
PR	(Netherlands) G Brouwer	1	0

=== Bottom half ===
First round
6	(Japan) A Santillan	6	1	6
Q	(India) Digvijaypratap Singh	4	6	4
WC	(Turkey) T Duran	5	6^{4}
(France) A Ghibaudo	7	7^{7}
(Ukraine) Vadym Ursu	6	3	4
(Portugal) T Pereira	3	6	6
(Argentina) Lucio Ratti	6^{5}	1
3	(United Kingdom) M Basing	7^{7}	6
7	I Simakin	5	6	6
(Romania) A Boitan	7	3	4
(China) F Sun	6	6
Semen Pankin	4	1
SE	(France) C Bittoun Kouzmine	6	3	6^{1}
LL	D Ostapenkov	3	6	7^{7}
(France) A Weber	3	4
2	(France) F Bax	6	6

Second round
6	(Japan) A Santillan	4	1
(France) A Ghibaudo	6	6
(Portugal) T Pereira	3	1
3	(United Kingdom) M Basing	6	6
7	I Simakin	6	7^{7}
(China) F Sun	3	6^{4}
LL	D Ostapenkov	7^{7}	6^{6}	1
2	(France) F Bax	6^{4}	7^{8}	6

Quarterfinals
(France) A Ghibaudo	6	0
3	(United Kingdom) M Basing	2	0^{r}
7	I Simakin	6	6^{7}	6
2	(France) F Bax	0	7^{9}	4

Semifinals
(France) A Ghibaudo	6^{5}	6^{2}
7	I Simakin	7^{7}	7^{7}
