= 2026 Wuning Challenger III – Singles =

Singles
- 2026 Wuning Challenger III

Final
- Champion: Alibek Kachmazov
- Runner-up: (Japan) Jay Friend
- Score: 4–6, 7–6^{(9–7)}, 7–6^{(8–6)}

Events
Singles	Doubles
- Wuning Challenger

Sun Fajing was the defending champion but lost in the quarterfinals to Alibek Kachmazov.

Kachmazov won the title after defeating Jay Friend 4–6, 7–6^{(9–7)}, 7–6^{(8–6)} in the final.

== Seeds ==
1. (United States) Keegan Smith (first round)
2. Marat Sharipov (second round, retired)
3. (Japan) Jay Friend (final)
4. (United Kingdom) Charles Broom (first round)
5. (Uzbekistan) Sergey Fomin (first round)
6. (China) Sun Fajing (quarterfinals)
7. (Japan) Akira Santillan (quarterfinals)
8. (Japan) Kaichi Uchida (second round)

== Draw ==
Key

- Q = Qualifier
- WC = Wild card
- LL = Lucky loser
- Alt = Alternate
- ITF = ITF entry
- PR = Protected ranking
- SR = Special ranking
- SE = Special exempt
- JE = Junior exempt
- JR = Junior Accelerator Programme entrant
- CO = College Accelerator Programme entrant
- NG = Next Gen Accelerator Program entrant
- w/o = Walkover
- r = Retired
- d = Defaulted

=== Finals ===
Semifinals
Q	(Japan) Keisuke Saitoh	2	1
3	(Japan) Jay Friend	6	6
Q	Alibek Kachmazov	7^{7}	6
(Australia) Omar Jasika	6^{4}	3

Final
3	(Japan) Jay Friend	6	6^{7}	6^{6}
Q	Alibek Kachmazov	4	7^{9}	7^{8}

=== Top half ===
First round
1	(United States) K Smith	6	6^{5}	3
(Japan) H Moriya	3	7^{7}	6
Q	(Japan) Keisuke Saitoh	7^{7}	6
(Czech Republic) D Palán	6^{4}	4
(Kazakhstan) B Zhukayev	4	4
Y Demin	6	6
(Switzerland) L Castelnuovo	3	6	6^{5}
7	(Japan) A Santillan	6	3	7^{7}
3	(Japan) J Friend	6	6
Q	(Japan) Yuta Kikuchi	1	4
(Malaysia) Mitsuki Wei Kang Leong	6	4	6
Alt	(India) Sidharth Rawat	3	6	1
Q	(United States) R Seggerman	7^{7}	6^{6}	7^{7}
(Japan) Hikaru Shiraishi	6^{4}	7^{8}	6^{2}
(Japan) M Imamura	6^{8}	2
8	(Japan) K Uchida	7^{10}	6

Second round
(Japan) H Moriya	2	3
Q	(Japan) K Saitoh	6	6
Y Demin	3	3
7	(Japan) A Santillan	6	6
3	(Japan) J Friend	6	6
(Malaysia) MWK Leong	3	3
Q	(United States) R Seggerman	4	7	6
8	(Japan) K Uchida	6	5	4

Quarterfinals
Q	(Japan) K Saitoh	6^{3}	6	6
7	(Japan) A Santillan	7^{7}	1	4
3	(Japan) J Friend	7^{7}	6
Q	(United States) R Seggerman	6^{5}	2

Semifinals
Q	(Japan) K Saitoh	2	1
3	(Japan) J Friend	6	6

=== Bottom half ===
First round
6	(China) F Sun	6	1
WC	(China) A Wang	3	0^{r}
(Thailand) K Samrej	6	6
(Australia) Enzo Aguiard	1	3
(United States) E Zhu	6	6
(Japan) Koki Matsuda	3	3
Q	A Kachmazov	4	7^{7}	6
4	(United Kingdom) C Broom	6	6^{5}	4
5	(Uzbekistan) S Fomin	2	6^{4}
Alt	Timofei Derepasko	6	7^{7}
Q	(Australia) M Purcell	6^{5}	1
Alt	(Poland) F Peliwo	7^{7}	6
(Australia) O Jasika	4	6	7
Q	Martin Borisiouk	6	3	5
Semen Pankin	5	4
2	M Sharipov	7	6

Second round
6	(China) F Sun	6	7
(Thailand) K Samrej	4	5
(United States) E Zhu	6^{6}	6^{5}
Q	A Kachmazov	7^{8}	7^{7}
Alt	T Derepasko	6	7^{12}
Alt	(Poland) F Peliwo	3	6^{10}
(Australia) O Jasika	6	3
2	M Sharipov	3	0^{r}

Quarterfinals
6	(China) F Sun	3	4
Q	A Kachmazov	6	6
Alt	T Derepasko	3	2
(Australia) O Jasika	6	6

Semifinals
Q	A Kachmazov	7^{7}	6
(Australia) O Jasika	6^{4}	3
