= 2026 Phan Thiết Challenger II =

- Date: 26 January – 1 February
- Edition: 2nd
- Surface: Hard
- Location: Phan Thiết, Vietnam

Champions

Singles
- Ilia Simakin

Doubles
- (South Korea) Nam Ji-sung / (South Korea) Park Ui-sung
- Phan Thiết Challenger

The 2026 NovaWorld Phan Thiết Challenger II was a professional tennis tournament played on hard courts. It was the second edition of the tournament which was part of the 2026 ATP Challenger Tour. It took place in Phan Thiết, Vietnam between 26 January and 1 February 2026.

== Singles main draw entrants ==
=== Seeds ===
Country	Player	Rank^{1}	Seed
ARG	Federico Agustín Gómez	192	1
GBR	Oliver Crawford	204	2
BEL	Gilles-Arnaud Bailly	208	3
TPE	Hsu Yu-hsiou	220	4
ITA	Federico Cinà	237	5
CHN	Zhou Yi	238	6
POL	Daniel Michalski	257	7
ESP	Pol Martín Tiffon	264	8

- ^{1} Rankings as of 19 January 2026.

=== Other entrants ===
The following players received wildcards into the singles main draw:

- (Germany) Nikolai Barsukov
- (Germany) Tim Handel
- (Vietnam) Vũ Hà Minh Đức

The following player received entry into the singles main draw as a special exempt:

- (South Korea) Kwon Soon-woo

The following players received entry from the qualifying draw:

- Petr Bar Biryukov
- (Australia) Chase Ferguson
- (Czech Republic) Marek Gengel
- (Spain) David Jordà Sanchis
- (Japan) Hayato Matsuoka
- (Italy) Michele Ribecai

== Champions ==
=== Singles ===
- Ilia Simakin def. (China) Zhou Yi 7–5, 6–4.

=== Doubles ===
- (South Korea) Nam Ji-sung / (South Korea) Park Ui-sung def. (Australia) Joshua Charlton / (Spain) Iván Marrero Curbelo 6–4, 6–3.
