= 2026 Wuning Challenger III =

- Date: 5 – 11 October
- Edition: 3rd
- Surface: Hard
- Location: Wuning, China

Champions

Singles
- Alibek Kachmazov

Doubles
- (Japan) Akira Santillan / (China) Zheng Baoluo
- Wuning Challenger

The 2026 Wuning Challenger III was a professional tennis tournament played on hard courts. It was the third edition of the tournament which was part of the 2026 ATP Challenger Tour. It took place in Wuning, China between 5 and 11 October 2026.

== Singles main-draw entrants ==
=== Seeds ===
Country	Player	Rank^{1}	Seed
USA	Keegan Smith	199	1
	Marat Sharipov	238	2
JPN	Jay Friend	255	3
GBR	Charles Broom	261	4
UZB	Sergey Fomin	289	5
CHN	Sun Fajing	299	6
JPN	Akira Santillan	317	7
JPN	Kaichi Uchida	379	8

- ^{1} Rankings are as of 28 September 2026.

=== Other entrants ===
The following player received a wildcard into the singles main draw:

- (China) Wang Aoran

The following players received entry into the singles main draw as alternates:

- Timofei Derepasko
- (Poland) Filip Peliwo
- (India) Sidharth Rawat

The following players received entry from the qualifying draw:

- Martin Borisiouk
- Alibek Kachmazov
- (Japan) Yuta Kikuchi
- (Australia) Max Purcell
- (Japan) Keisuke Saitoh
- (United States) Ryan Seggerman

== Champions ==
=== Singles ===
- Alibek Kachmazov def. (Japan) Jay Friend 4–6, 7–6^{(9–7)}, 7–6^{(8–6)}.

=== Doubles ===
- (Japan) Akira Santillan / (China) Zheng Baoluo def. Yaroslav Demin / Timofei Derepasko 3–6, 6–3, [10–4].
