= 2026 Wuning Challenger II =

- Date: 13 – 19 April
- Edition: 2nd
- Surface: Hard
- Location: Wuning, China

Champions

Singles
- (China) Sun Fajing

Doubles
- (Chinese Taipei) Jason Jung / (Japan) Kaito Uesugi
- Wuning Challenger

The 2026 Wuning Open II was a professional tennis tournament played on hard courts. It was the second edition of the tournament which was part of the 2026 ATP Challenger Tour. It took place in Wuning, China between 13 and 19 April 2026.

== Singles main-draw entrants ==
=== Seeds ===
| Country | Player | Rank^{1} | Seed |
|---|---|---|---|
| ~~GBR~~ | ~~Harry Wendelken~~ | ~~237~~ | ~~1~~ |
| GBR | Charles Broom | 246 | 2 |
| CHN | Sun Fajing | 251 | 3 |
| KAZ | Mikhail Kukushkin | 278 | 4 |
| USA | Keegan Smith | 301 | 5 |
| THA | Maximus Jones | 323 | 6 |
| GBR | Giles Hussey | 326 | 7 |
| BEL | Buvaysar Gadamauri | 361 | 8 |

- ^{1} Rankings are as of 6 April 2026.

=== Other entrants ===
The following players received wildcards into the singles main draw:

- (China) Wang Aoran
- (China) Xiao Linang
- (China) Zeng Yaojie

The following players received entry from the qualifying draw:

- (Australia) Enzo Aguiard
- (Japan) Masamichi Imamura
- (Malaysia) Mitsuki Wei Kang Leong
- Daniil Ostapenkov
- (Uzbekistan) Khumoyun Sultanov
- (Japan) Leo Vithoontien

The following player received entry as a lucky loser:

- (Australia) Tai Sach

== Champions ==
=== Singles ===
- (China) Sun Fajing def. (Australia) Li Tu 5–7, 6–4, 7–5.

=== Doubles ===
- (Chinese Taipei) Jason Jung / (Japan) Kaito Uesugi def. (United States) Keegan Smith / (China) Zheng Baoluo 6–7^{(3–7)}, 6–3, [10–6].
