= 2026 Phan Thiết Challenger =

- Date: 19–25 January
- Edition: 1st
- Surface: Hard
- Location: Phan Thiết, Vietnam

Champions

Singles
- (South Korea) Kwon Soon-woo

Doubles
- (Japan) James Trotter / (Japan) Kaito Uesugi
- Phan Thiết Challenger

The 2026 NovaWorld Phan Thiết Challenger was a professional tennis tournament played on hardcourts. It was the first edition of the tournament which was part of the 2026 ATP Challenger Tour. It took place in Phan Thiết, Vietnam between 19 and 25 January 2026.

== Singles main draw entrants ==
=== Seeds ===
Country	Player	Rank^{1}	Seed
JPN	Yosuke Watanuki	162	1
CRO	Luka Mikrut	163	2
KAZ	Timofey Skatov	195	3
GBR	Oliver Crawford	203	4
BEL	Gilles-Arnaud Bailly	207	5
FRA	Luka Pavlovic	217	6
GBR	Ryan Peniston	219	7
TPE	Hsu Yu-hsiou	220	8

- ^{1} Rankings as of 12 January 2026.

=== Other entrants ===
The following players received wildcards into the singles main draw:

- (Germany) Nikolai Barsukov
- (France) Lilian Marmousez
- (Vietnam) Vũ Hà Minh Đức

The following players received entry from the qualifying draw:

- (South Korea) Chung Hyeon
- (Czech Republic) Marek Gengel
- (South Korea) Kwon Soon-woo
- (Germany) Max Hans Rehberg
- (Italy) Michele Ribecai
- (France) Arthur Weber

== Champions ==
=== Singles ===
- (South Korea) Kwon Soon-woo def. Ilia Simakin 6–2, 7–6^{(7–5)}.

=== Doubles ===
- (Japan) James Trotter / (Japan) Kaito Uesugi def. (United States) George Goldhoff / (United States) Reese Stalder 6–3, 5–7, [10–4].
