= 2026 Phan Thiết Challenger II – Doubles =

Doubles
- 2026 Phan Thiết Challenger II

Final
- Champions: (South Korea) Nam Ji-sung (South Korea) Park Ui-sung
- Runners-up: (Australia) Joshua Charlton (Spain) Iván Marrero Curbelo
- Score: 6–4, 6–3

Events
Singles	Doubles
- Phan Thiết Challenger

James Trotter and Kaito Uesugi were the defending champions but only Uesugi chose to defend his title, partnering Jason Jung. He lost in the semifinals to Joshua Charlton and Iván Marrero Curbelo.

Nam Ji-sung and Park Ui-sung won the title after defeating Charlton and Marrero Curbelo 6–4, 6–3 in the final.

== Seeds ==
1. (South Korea) Nam Ji-sung / (South Korea) Park Ui-sung (champions)
2. (Argentina) Federico Agustín Gómez / (New Zealand) Ajeet Rai (first round)
3. (Chinese Taipei) Jason Jung / (Japan) Kaito Uesugi (semifinals)
4. (Australia) Ethan Cook / (Australia) Kody Pearson (semifinals)

== Draw ==
Key

- Q = Qualifier
- WC = Wild card
- LL = Lucky loser
- Alt = Alternate
- ITF = ITF entry
- PR = Protected ranking
- SR = Special ranking
- SE = Special exempt
- JE = Junior exempt
- JR = Junior Accelerator Programme entrant
- CO = College Accelerator Programme entrant
- NG = Next Gen Accelerator Program entrant
- w/o = Walkover
- r = Retired
- d = Defaulted

First round
1	(South Korea) J-s Nam (South Korea) U-s Park	6	6
WC	(Vietnam) Nguyễn Minh Phát (Vietnam) Trần Quốc Cường	2	2
(France) C Denolly (Ukraine) V Orlov	3	2
P Bar Biryukov; I Simakin	6	6
4	(Australia) Ethan Cook (Australia) K Pearson	1	6	[11]
WC	(Australia) Chase Ferguson (Australia) Lachlan McFadzean	6	3	[9]
(Switzerland) L Castelnuovo (China) A Wang	6	7
(Netherlands) T Loof; M Sharipov	4	5
PR	(France) G Jacq (Tunisia) S Mansouri	6	6
(France) F Bax (France) R Bertrand	2	4
(India) A Kalyanpur (China) F Sun	3	1
3	(Chinese Taipei) J Jung (Japan) K Uesugi	6	6
(Australia) J Charlton (Spain) Iván Marrero Curbelo	6	6
(Philippines) FC Alcantara (Zimbabwe) CJ Lock	3	3
Alt	(Japan) K Isomura (Thailand) M Jones	7^{7}	2	[10]
2	(Argentina) FA Gómez (New Zealand) A Rai	6^{4}	6	[8]

Quarterfinals
1	(South Korea) J-s Nam (South Korea) U-s Park	6	6
P Bar Biryukov; I Simakin	2	4
4	(Australia) E Cook (Australia) K Pearson	6	3	[10]
(Switzerland) L Castelnuovo (China) A Wang	3	6	[4]
PR	(France) G Jacq (Tunisia) S Mansouri	6	3	[7]
3	(Chinese Taipei) J Jung (Japan) K Uesugi	4	6	[10]
(Australia) J Charlton (Spain) I Marrero Curbelo	6	6
Alt	(Japan) K Isomura (Thailand) M Jones	3	3

Semifinals
1	(South Korea) J-s Nam (South Korea) U-s Park	7^{7}	6
4	(Australia) E Cook (Australia) K Pearson	6^{1}	1
3	(Chinese Taipei) J Jung (Japan) K Uesugi	2	7^{7}	[7]
(Australia) J Charlton (Spain) I Marrero Curbelo	6	6^{3}	[10]

Final
1	(South Korea) J-s Nam (South Korea) U-s Park	6	6
(Australia) J Charlton (Spain) I Marrero Curbelo	4	3
