= 2026 Wuning Challenger II – Singles =

Singles
- 2026 Wuning Challenger II

Final
- Champion: (China) Sun Fajing
- Runner-up: (Australia) Li Tu
- Score: 5–7, 6–4, 7–5

Events
Singles	Doubles
- Wuning Challenger

Pavel Kotov was the defending champion but chose not to defend his title.

Sun Fajing won the title after defeating Li Tu 5–7, 6–4, 7–5 in the final.

== Seeds ==
1. (United Kingdom) Harry Wendelken (withdrew)
2. (United Kingdom) Charles Broom (semifinals)
3. (China) Sun Fajing (champion)
4. (Kazakhstan) Mikhail Kukushkin (second round)
5. (United States) Keegan Smith (second round)
6. (Thailand) Maximus Jones (second round)
7. (United Kingdom) Giles Hussey (quarterfinals)
8. (Belgium) Buvaysar Gadamauri (quarterfinals)

== Draw ==
Key

- Q = Qualifier
- WC = Wild card
- LL = Lucky loser
- Alt = Alternate
- ITF = ITF entry
- PR = Protected ranking
- SR = Special ranking
- SE = Special exempt
- JE = Junior exempt
- JR = Junior Accelerator Programme entrant
- CO = College Accelerator Programme entrant
- NG = Next Gen Accelerator Program entrant
- w/o = Walkover
- r = Retired
- d = Defaulted

=== Finals ===
Semifinals
(Uzbekistan) Sergey Fomin	4	4
3	(China) Sun Fajing	6	6
(Australia) Li Tu	6	1	7^{8}
2	(United Kingdom) Charles Broom	3	6	6^{6}

Final
3	(China) Sun Fajing	5	6	7
(Australia) Li Tu	7	4	5

=== Top half ===
First round
Q	D Ostapenkov	3	4
(Uzbekistan) S Fomin	6	6
Q	(Japan) M Imamura	4	5
(Australia) M Bouzige	6	7
Q	(Malaysia) Mitsuki Wei Kang Leong	2	2
(South Korea) Shin San-hui	6	6
(Australia) O Jasika	4	7	2
6	(Thailand) M Jones	6	5	6
3	(China) F Sun	6	6
LL	(Australia) Tai Sach	2	1
WC	(China) A Wang	3	6^{4}
Q	(Uzbekistan) K Sultanov	6	7^{7}
(Canada) J Boulais	4	7^{7}	6
(Australia) P Sekulic	6	6^{2}	4
(France) A Weber	2	2
7	(United Kingdom) G Hussey	6	6

Second round
(Uzbekistan) S Fomin	1	7^{11}	6
(Australia) M Bouzige	6	6^{9}	4
(South Korea) S-h Shin	6	6
6	(Thailand) M Jones	3	3
3	(China) F Sun	6	6
Q	(Uzbekistan) K Sultanov	4	2
(Canada) J Boulais	4	4
7	(United Kingdom) G Hussey	6	6

Quarterfinals
(Uzbekistan) S Fomin	6	5	6
(South Korea) S-h Shin	3	7	3
3	(China) F Sun	6	3	6
7	(United Kingdom) G Hussey	2	6	2

Semifinals
(Uzbekistan) S Fomin	4	4
3	(China) F Sun	6	6

=== Bottom half ===
First round
5	(United States) K Smith	6	6
Q	(Australia) Enzo Aguiard	4	4
(Japan) H Matsuoka	3	6^{5}
(Australia) L Tu	6	7^{7}
WC	(China) Xiao Linang	6	6^{6}	4
(Australia) B Ellis	4	7^{8}	6
(China) J Cui	6	4	1
4	(Kazakhstan) M Kukushkin	4	6	6
8	(Belgium) B Gadamauri	6	6
(United States) B Shick	4	2
Q	(Japan) Leo Vithoontien	6	6^{5}	6
WC	(China) Zeng Yaojie	4	7^{7}	1
(United Kingdom) A Gray	4	2
(Italy) A Binda	6	6
(Japan) H Moriya	2	1
2	(United Kingdom) C Broom	6	6

Second round
5	(United States) K Smith	6	5	6^{9}
(Australia) L Tu	3	7	7^{11}
(Australia) B Ellis	6	7^{7}
4	(Kazakhstan) M Kukushkin	3	6^{5}
8	(Belgium) B Gadamauri	6	6
Q	(Japan) L Vithoontien	4	2
(Italy) A Binda	2	2
2	(United Kingdom) C Broom	6	6

Quarterfinals
(Australia) L Tu	6	6
(Australia) B Ellis	3	3
8	(Belgium) B Gadamauri	6^{3}	7^{7}	6^{4}
2	(United Kingdom) C Broom	7^{7}	6^{4}	7^{7}

Semifinals
(Australia) L Tu	6	1	7^{8}
2	(United Kingdom) C Broom	3	6	6^{6}
