= 2026 ENKA Open – Doubles =

Doubles
- 2026 ENKA Open

Final
- Champions: (Turkey) Arda Azkara (United Kingdom) James MacKinlay
- Runners-up: Sergey Betov; Ilia Simakin
- Score: 6–3, 6–1

Events
Singles	Doubles
- ENKA Open

This was the first edition of the tournament.

Arda Azkara and James MacKinlay won the title after defeating Sergey Betov and Ilia Simakin 6–3, 6–1 in the final.

== Seeds ==
1. (Turkey) Arda Azkara / (United Kingdom) James MacKinlay (champions)
2. Daniil Ostapenkov / (Portugal) Tiago Pereira (quarterfinals)
3. (Japan) Yusuke Kusuhara / (Japan) Shunsuke Nakagawa (first round)
4. (Brazil) Luís Britto / (Brazil) Natan Rodrigues (first round)

== Draw ==
Key

- Q = Qualifier
- WC = Wild card
- LL = Lucky loser
- Alt = Alternate
- ITF = ITF entry
- PR = Protected ranking
- SR = Special ranking
- SE = Special exempt
- JE = Junior exempt
- JR = Junior Accelerator Programme entrant
- CO = College Accelerator Programme entrant
- NG = Next Gen Accelerator Program entrant
- w/o = Walkover
- r = Retired
- d = Defaulted

First round
1	(Turkey) A Azkara (United Kingdom) J MacKinlay	1
Alt	(Turkey) Mert Alkaya (Turkey) T Duran	0^{r}
(Romania) A Boitan (Argentina) Lucio Ratti	6	6
Alt	(India) M Dhamne (India) Digvijaypratap Singh	3	4
4	(Brazil) L Britto (Brazil) Natan Rodrigues	7^{7}	6^{5}	[5]
(India) J Nedunchezhiyan (China) A Wang	6^{5}	7^{7}	[10]
WC	(Turkey) S Mert Özdemir (Turkey) MN Türker	4	6	[7]
(France) C Bittoun Kouzmine (Tunisia) A Ouakaa	6	2	[10]
(China) F Sun (Kazakhstan) D Yevseyev	6	6
(Kazakhstan) G Lomakin (Northern Mariana Islands) C Sinclair	2	4
S Betov; I Simakin	7	2	[10]
3	(Japan) Y Kusuhara (Japan) S Nakagawa	5	6	[7]
WC	(Turkey) T Altuna; Mikhail Fufygin	2	1
P Bar Biryukov (Italy) A Binda	6	6
(Cyprus) E Neos; Semen Pankin	4	6^{3}
2	D Ostapenkov (Portugal) T Pereira	6	7^{7}

Quarterfinals
1	(Turkey) A Azkara (United Kingdom) J MacKinlay	7^{7}	7^{7}
(Romania) A Boitan (Argentina) L Ratti	6^{3}	6^{4}
(India) J Nedunchezhiyan (China) A Wang	6	6
(France) C Bittoun Kouzmine (Tunisia) A Ouakaa	3	4
(China) F Sun (Kazakhstan) D Yevseyev	4	6	[7]
S Betov; I Simakin	6	3	[10]
P Bar Biryukov (Italy) A Binda	2	6	[11]
2	D Ostapenkov (Portugal) T Pereira	6	3	[9]

Semifinals
1	(Turkey) A Azkara (United Kingdom) J MacKinlay	7	6
(India) J Nedunchezhiyan (China) A Wang	5	4
S Betov; I Simakin	4	6	[10]
P Bar Biryukov (Italy) A Binda	6	3	[8]

Final
1	(Turkey) A Azkara (United Kingdom) J MacKinlay	6	6
S Betov; I Simakin	3	1
