= 2026 Phan Thiết Challenger II – Singles =

Singles
- 2026 Phan Thiết Challenger II

Final
- Champion: Ilia Simakin
- Runner-up: (China) Zhou Yi
- Score: 7–5, 6–4

Events
Singles	Doubles
- Phan Thiết Challenger

Kwon Soon-woo was the defending champion but lost in the first round to Stefanos Sakellaridis.

Ilia Simakin won the title after defeating Zhou Yi 7–5, 6–4 in the final.

== Seeds ==
1. (Argentina) Federico Agustín Gómez (first round)
2. (United Kingdom) Oliver Crawford (first round)
3. (Belgium) Gilles-Arnaud Bailly (second round)
4. (Chinese Taipei) Hsu Yu-hsiou (quarterfinals)
5. (Italy) Federico Cinà (first round)
6. (China) Zhou Yi (final)
7. (Poland) Daniel Michalski (semifinals, retired)
8. (Spain) Pol Martín Tiffon (quarterfinals)

== Draw ==
Key

- Q = Qualifier
- WC = Wild card
- LL = Lucky loser
- Alt = Alternate
- ITF = ITF entry
- PR = Protected ranking
- SR = Special ranking
- SE = Special exempt
- JE = Junior exempt
- JR = Junior Accelerator Programme entrant
- CO = College Accelerator Programme entrant
- NG = Next Gen Accelerator Program entrant
- w/o = Walkover
- r = Retired
- d = Defaulted

=== Finals ===
Semifinals
Ilia Simakin	3	6	6
(Greece) Stefanos Sakellaridis	6	4	3
6	(China) Zhou Yi	7^{7}	0
7	(Poland) Daniel Michalski	6^{3}	0^{r}

Final
Ilia Simakin	7	6
6	(China) Zhou Yi	5	4

=== Top half ===
First round
1	(Argentina) FA Gómez	6^{3}	5
WC	(Germany) Nikolai Barsukov	7^{7}	7
Q	(Spain) D Jordà Sanchis	3	6	1^{r}
(South Korea) Shin San-hui	6	3	2
Q	P Bar Biryukov	6	6
Q	(Italy) M Ribecai	4	2
I Simakin	6	3	6
5	(Italy) F Cinà	3	6	3
3	(Belgium) GA Bailly	6	6
Q	(Japan) H Matsuoka	1	3
SE	(South Korea) S-w Kwon	2	3
(Greece) S Sakellaridis	6	6
(Thailand) M Jones	6	7^{7}
M Sharipov	3	6^{4}
WC	(Vietnam) Vũ Hà Minh Đức	1	2
8	(Spain) P Martín Tiffon	6	6

Second round
WC	(Germany) N Barsukov	6	6
(South Korea) S-h Shin	1	3
Q	P Bar Biryukov	6	4	2
I Simakin	4	6	6
3	(Belgium) GA Bailly	3	2
(Greece) S Sakellaridis	6	6
(Thailand) M Jones	2	2
8	(Spain) P Martín Tiffon	6	6

Quarterfinals
WC	(Germany) N Barsukov	6^{2}	5
I Simakin	7^{7}	7
(Greece) S Sakellaridis	6	6
8	(Spain) P Martín Tiffon	2	3

Semifinals
I Simakin	3	6	6
(Greece) S Sakellaridis	6	4	3

=== Bottom half ===
First round
6	(China) Y Zhou	6	7^{7}
(China) J Cui	3	6^{4}
(France) C Denolly	6	6
(South Korea) H Chung	2	4
(United States) Dar Blanch	6	6
Q	(Australia) Chase Ferguson	0	1
(France) R Bertrand	5	6^{5}
4	(Chinese Taipei) Y-h Hsu	7	7^{7}
7	(Poland) D Michalski	7	6
WC	(Germany) T Handel	5	1
(France) Lilian Marmousez	4^{r}
(Australia) O Jasika	3
(France) F Bax	2	6	6
(China) F Sun	6	3	4
Q	(Czech Republic) M Gengel	1	6	6
2	(United Kingdom) O Crawford	6	1	1

Second round
6	(China) Y Zhou	6	7^{7}
(France) C Denolly	1	6^{2}
(United States) Dar Blanch	0	6	3
4	(Chinese Taipei) Y-h Hsu	6	3	6
7	(Poland) D Michalski	6	1	6
(Australia) O Jasika	4	6	1
(France) F Bax	6	1
Q	(Czech Republic) M Gengel	2	0^{r}

Quarterfinals
6	(China) Y Zhou	7^{7}	6
4	(Chinese Taipei) Y-h Hsu	6^{4}	3
7	(Poland) D Michalski	6	6
(France) F Bax	2	4

Semifinals
6	(China) Y Zhou	7^{7}	0
7	(Poland) D Michalski	6^{3}	0^{r}
