= ENKA Open =

ENKA Open may refer to:

- ENKA Open, a women's professional tennis tournament on the WTA 125 Tour
- ENKA Open, a men's professional tennis tournament on the ATP Challenger Tour
