= 2026 Phan Thiết Challenger III – Singles =

Singles
- 2026 Phan Thiết Challenger III

Final
- Champion: Ilia Simakin
- Runner-up: (France) Arthur Weber
- Score: 6–4, 7–6^{(7–5)}

Events
Singles	Doubles
- Phan Thiết Challenger

Ilia Simakin was the defending championand successfully defended his title after defeating Arthur Weber 6–4, 7–6^{(7–5)} in the final.

== Seeds ==
1. (France) Moïse Kouamé (first round)
2. (Mexico) Rodrigo Pacheco Méndez (first round)
3. Ilia Simakin (champion)
4. (France) Florent Bax (first round)
5. (Australia) Philip Sekulic (quarterfinals)
6. (Australia) Cruz Hewitt (quarterfinals)
7. (Japan) Yuta Shimizu (semifinals)
8. (France) Arthur Weber (final)

== Draw ==
Key

- Q = Qualifier
- WC = Wild card
- LL = Lucky loser
- Alt = Alternate
- ITF = ITF entry
- PR = Protected ranking
- SR = Special ranking
- SE = Special exempt
- JE = Junior exempt
- JR = Junior Accelerator Programme entrant
- CO = College Accelerator Programme entrant
- NG = Next Gen Accelerator Program entrant
- w/o = Walkover
- r = Retired
- d = Defaulted

=== Finals ===
Semifinals
8	(France) Arthur Weber	6	6
7	(Japan) Yuta Shimizu	4	4
3	Ilia Simakin	6	2	6
WC	(Australia) Max Purcell	3	6	2

Final
8	(France) Arthur Weber	4	6^{5}
3	Ilia Simakin	6	7^{7}

=== Top half ===
First round
1	(France) M Kouamé	6	4	5
(Japan) Kenta Miyoshi	4	6	7
Q	(Kazakhstan) G Lomakin	1	6	6^{6}
(Poland) F Peliwo	6	4	7^{8}
(Australia) Tai Sach	6	6
WC	(Vietnam) Trương Thành Minh	1	3
WC	(Vietnam) Trần Quốc Cường	0	0
8	(France) A Weber	6	6
4	(France) F Bax	0	6	6^{4}
(Thailand) M Jones	6	3	7^{7}
(Japan) H Moriya	4	6	6
(Czech Republic) D Palán	6	1	2
(Thailand) K Samrej	6	6^{6}	6
(India) Sidharth Rawat	2	7^{8}	2
Q	(India) Aditya Vishal Balsekar	1	1
7	(Japan) Y Shimizu	6	6

Second round
(Japan) K Miyoshi	6^{2}	3
(Poland) F Peliwo	7^{7}	6
(Australia) T Sach	0	0
8	(France) A Weber	6	6
(Thailand) M Jones	3	6^{4}
(Japan) H Moriya	6	7^{7}
(Thailand) K Samrej	4	4
7	(Japan) Y Shimizu	6	6

Quarterfinals
(Poland) F Peliwo	6^{5}	2
8	(France) A Weber	7^{7}	6
(Japan) H Moriya	7	5	6^{3}
7	(Japan) Y Shimizu	5	7	7^{7}

Semifinals
8	(France) A Weber	6	6
7	(Japan) Y Shimizu	4	4

=== Bottom half ===
First round
5	(Australia) P Sekulic	6	1
(Australia) M Bouzige	3	0^{r}
Q	Martin Borisiouk	5	6^{4}
(Japan) Koki Matsuda	7	7^{7}
(Australia) Enzo Aguiard	2	6	7^{7}
(Uzbekistan) K Sultanov	6	3	6^{4}
(Spain) Sergio Callejón Hernando	6^{7}	6	2
3	I Simakin	7^{9}	2	6
6	(Australia) C Hewitt	6	7
(France) C Bittoun Kouzmine	4	5
Q	Timofei Derepasko	6	4	6
Q	(Australia) Sam Ryan Ziegann	3	6	4
Q	(Australia) Benjamin O'Connell	6^{6}	3
(Australia) B Ellis	7^{8}	6
WC	(Australia) M Purcell	6	6
2	(Mexico) R Pacheco Méndez	3	4

Second round
5	(Australia) P Sekulic	6	4	7
(Japan) K Matsuda	2	6	5
(Australia) E Aguiard	2	0
3	I Simakin	6	6
6	(Australia) C Hewitt	6	6
Q	T Derepasko	3	2
(Australia) B Ellis	4	4
WC	(Australia) M Purcell	6	6

Quarterfinals
5	(Australia) P Sekulic	4	3
3	I Simakin	6	6
6	(Australia) C Hewitt	5	3
WC	(Australia) M Purcell	7	6

Semifinals
3	I Simakin	6	2	6
WC	(Australia) M Purcell	3	6	2
