= 2026 Phan Thiết Challenger IV =

- Date: 14–20 September
- Edition: 4th
- Surface: Hard
- Location: Phan Thiết, Vietnam

Champions

Singles
- Ilia Simakin

Doubles
- (France) Constantin Bittoun Kouzmine / (India) S D Prajwal Dev
- Phan Thiết Challenger

The 2026 Sport Festival Phan Thiết Challenger IV was a professional tennis tournament played on hard courts. It was the fourth edition of the tournament which was part of the 2026 ATP Challenger Tour. It took place in Phan Thiết, Vietnam between 14 and 20 September 2026.

== Singles main draw entrants ==
=== Seeds ===
Country	Player	Rank^{1}	Seed
FRA	Moïse Kouamé	200	1
FRA	Luka Pavlovic	203	2
MEX	Rodrigo Pacheco Méndez	272	3
	Ilia Simakin	275	4
AUS	Matthew Dellavedova	293	5
FRA	Florent Bax	303	6
AUS	Philip Sekulic	353	7
AUS	Cruz Hewitt	354	8

- ^{1} Rankings as of 31 August 2026.

=== Other entrants ===
The following players received wildcards into the singles main draw:

- (Australia) Benjamin O'Connell
- (Vietnam) Trương Thành Minh
- (Vietnam) Vũ Hà Minh Đức

The following players received entry from the qualifying draw:

- Martin Borisiouk
- Timofei Derepasko
- (United States) Hunter Heck
- (Kazakhstan) Grigoriy Lomakin
- (Japan) Ryuki Matsuda
- (Poland) Filip Peliwo

== Champions ==
=== Singles ===
- Ilia Simakin def. (Mexico) Rodrigo Pacheco Méndez 6–7^{(4–7)}, 6–4, 6–3.

=== Doubles ===
- (France) Constantin Bittoun Kouzmine / (India) S D Prajwal Dev def. (Australia) Joshua Charlton / (Japan) Yuta Shimizu 6–4, 7–6^{(7–1)}.
