= 2026 Phan Thiết Challenger III =

- Date: 7–13 September
- Edition: 3rd
- Surface: Hard
- Location: Phan Thiết, Vietnam

Champions

Singles
- Ilia Simakin

Doubles
- (France) Constantin Bittoun Kouzmine / (India) S D Prajwal Dev
- Phan Thiết Challenger

The 2026 Sport Festival Phan Thiết Challenger III was a professional tennis tournament played on hard courts. It was the third edition of the tournament which was part of the 2026 ATP Challenger Tour. It took place in Phan Thiết, Vietnam between 7 and 13 September 2026.

== Singles main draw entrants ==
=== Seeds ===
Country	Player	Rank^{1}	Seed
FRA	Moïse Kouamé	200	1
MEX	Rodrigo Pacheco Méndez	272	2
	Ilia Simakin	275	3
FRA	Florent Bax	303	4
AUS	Philip Sekulic	353	5
AUS	Cruz Hewitt	354	6
JPN	Yuta Shimizu	396	7
FRA	Arthur Weber	405	8

- ^{1} Rankings as of 31 August 2026.

=== Other entrants ===
The following players received wildcards into the singles main draw:

- (Australia) Max Purcell
- (Vietnam) Trần Quốc Cường
- (Vietnam) Trương Thành Minh

The following players received entry from the qualifying draw:

- Martin Borisiouk
- Timofei Derepasko
- (Kazakhstan) Grigoriy Lomakin
- (Australia) Benjamin O'Connell
- (Australia) Sam Ryan Ziegann
- (India) Aditya Vishal Balsekar

== Champions ==
=== Singles ===
- Ilia Simakin def. (France) Arthur Weber 6–4, 7–6^{(7–5)}.

=== Doubles ===
- (France) Constantin Bittoun Kouzmine / (India) S D Prajwal Dev def. (Japan) Yamato Sueoka / (Japan) Naoki Tajima 6–1, 7–6^{(7–0)}.
