= Yangzhou Township =

Yangzhou Township 杨洲乡
- Township
- Location in Jiangxi Yangzhou Township (China)
- Coordinates: 29°9′42″N 115°22′54″E
- Country: People's Republic of China
- Province: Jiangxi
- Prefecture-level city: Jiujiang
- County: Wuning County
- Time zone: UTC+8 (China Standard)

Yangzhou Township (simplified Chinese: 杨洲乡; traditional Chinese: 楊洲鄉; pinyin: Yángzhōu Xiāng) is a township under the administration of Wuning County, Jiangxi, China. As of 2018, it has 6 villages under its administration.
