= 2026 ENKA Open =

- Date: 3 – 9 August
- Edition: 1st
- Surface: Hard
- Location: Istanbul, Turkey

Champions

Singles
- (France) Lucas Poullain

Doubles
- (Turkey) Arda Azkara / (United Kingdom) James MacKinlay
- ENKA Open

The 2026 ENKA Open was a professional tennis tournament played on hardcourts. It was the first edition of the tournament which was part of the 2026 ATP Challenger Tour. It took place in Istanbul, Turkey between 3 and 9 August 2026.

== Singles main draw entrants ==
=== Seeds ===
Country	Player	Rank^{1}	Seed
FRA	Dan Added	224	1
FRA	Florent Bax	247	2
GBR	Max Basing	257	3
	Petr Bar Biryukov	281	4
TUR	Yankı Erel	287	5
JPN	Akira Santillan	288	6
	Ilia Simakin	294	7
TUR	Mert Alkaya	298	8

- ^{1} Rankings as of 27 July 2026.

=== Other entrants ===
The following players received wildcards into the singles main draw:

- (Turkey) Arda Azkara
- (Turkey) Tuncay Duran
- (Turkey) Mert Naci Türker

The following players received entry into the singles main draw using protected rankings:

- (Netherlands) Gijs Brouwer
- (France) ~~Gabriel Debru~~

The following player received entry into the singles main draw as a special exempt:

- (France) Constantin Bittoun Kouzmine

The following player received entry into the singles main draw through the College Accelerator programme:

- (France) Paul Inchauspé

The following player received entry into the singles main draw as an alternate:

- (Kazakhstan) Denis Yevseyev

The following players received entry from the qualifying draw:

- (Italy) Alexander Binda
- (Japan) Koki Matsuda
- (Japan) Kenta Miyoshi
- (Georgia (country)) Saba Purtseladze
- (India) Digvijaypratap Singh
- (Turkey) Kerem Yılmaz

The following player received entry as a lucky loser:

- Daniil Ostapenkov

== Champions ==
=== Singles ===
- (France) Lucas Poullain def. Ilia Simakin 5–7, 6–2, 6–3.

=== Doubles ===
- (Turkey) Arda Azkara / (United Kingdom) James MacKinlay def. Sergey Betov / Ilia Simakin 6–3, 6–1.
