= Yaroslav Demin =

Russian tennis player (born 2005)

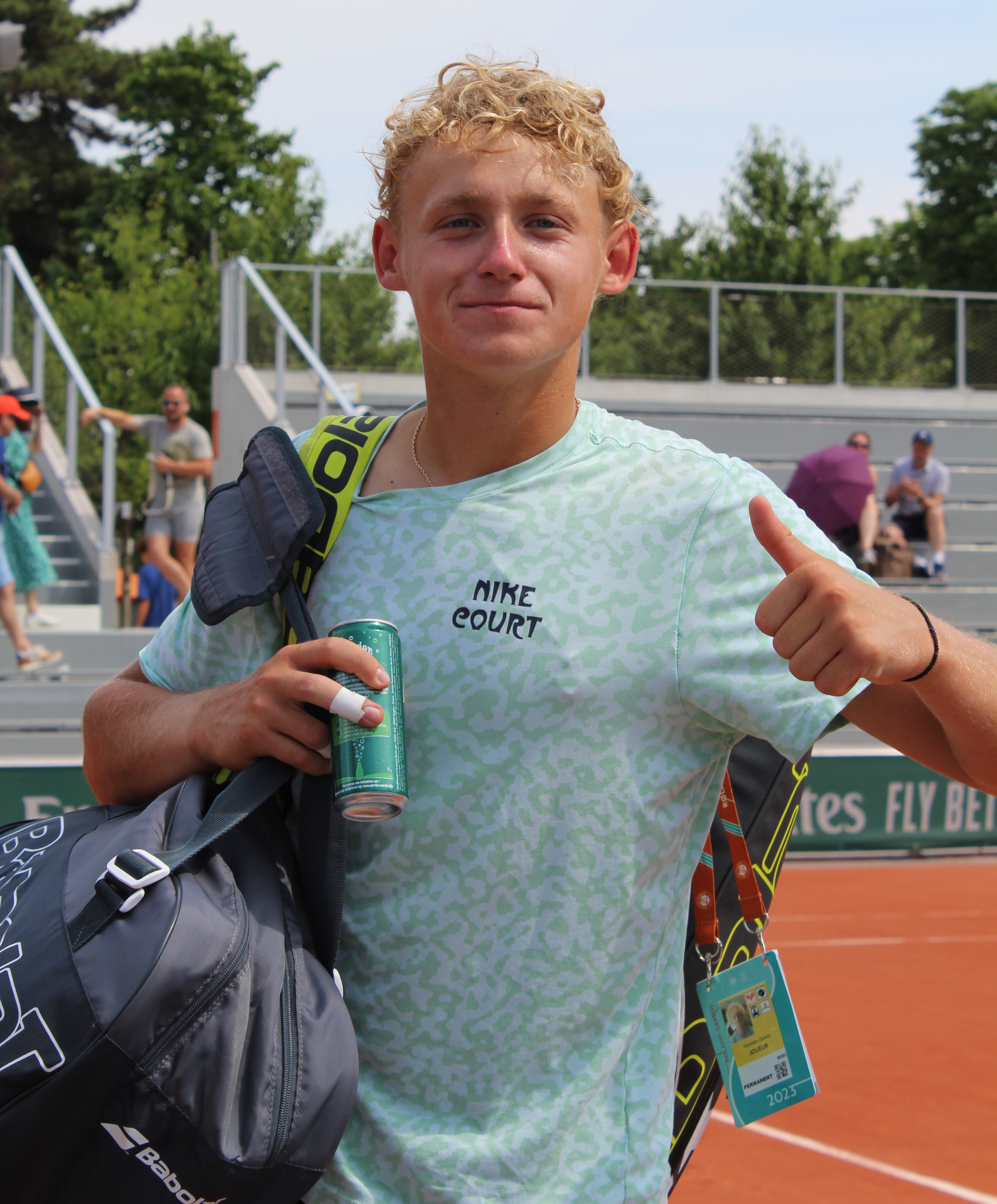
- Demin at the 2023 French Open
- Country (sports): Russia
- Born: 30 August 2005 (age 21) Moscow, Russia
- Height: 1.85 m (6 ft 1 in)
- Plays: Right-handed (two-handed backhand)
- Prize money: US $73,600

Singles
- Career record: 0–0 (at ATP Tour level, Grand Slam level, and in Davis Cup)
- Career titles: 0
- Highest ranking: No. 358 (2 November 2026)
- Current ranking: No. 361 (9 November 2026)

Doubles
- Career record: 0–0 (at ATP Tour level, Grand Slam level, and in Davis Cup)
- Career titles: 0
- Highest ranking: No. 625 (2 November 2026)
- Current ranking: No. 627 (9 November 2026)
- Last updated on: 9 November 2026.

Yaroslav Aleksandrovich Demin (Russian: Ярослав Александрович Дёмин, born 30 August 2005) is a Russian professional tennis player. He has a career-high ATP singles ranking of No. 358 and a doubles ranking of No. 625, both achieved on 2 November 2026. Demin plays mostly on the ITF Tour.

== Junior career ==
In March 2023, Demin won the Banana Bowl, a top junior-level event hosted in Criciúma, Brazil. He defeated Brazilian João Fonseca in the final.

A few months later, Demin earned his biggest title at junior-level: A major in the boys' doubles category at the 2023 French Open, playing with Mexican Rodrigo Pacheco Méndez. He also was a runner-up in singles at 2023 Wimbledon, losing to local player Henry Searle in straight sets.

Demin had good results in Juniors, maintaining a 104–53 singles win-loss record and reached an ITF junior combined ranking of world No. 1 on 17 July 2023.

== ATP Challenger Tour finals ==
=== Singles: 1 (title) ===
Legend ATP Challenger Tour (1–0)

Result	W–L	Date	Tournament	Tier	Surface	Opponent	Score
Win	1–0	October 2026	Ningbo Challenger, China	Challenger	Hard	Petr Bar Biryukov	7–5, 2–6, 7–6^{(8–6)}

=== Doubles: 1 (runner-up) ===
Legend ATP Challenger Tour (0–1)

Result	W–L	Date	Tournament	Tier	Surface	Partner	Opponents	Score
Loss	0–1	Oct 2026	Wuning Challenger III, China	Challenger	Hard	Timofei Derepasko	(Japan) Akira Santillan (China) Zheng Baoluo	6–3, 3–6, [4–10]

== ITF World Tennis Tour finals ==
=== Singles: 5 (4 titles, 1 runner-up) ===
Legend ITF WTT (4–1)	Finals by surface Hard (4–1) Clay (–)

Result	W–L	Date	Tournament	Tier	Surface	Opponent	Score
Win	1–0	Jan 2024	M15 Manacor, Spain	WTT	Hard	(Croatia) Luka Mikrut	6–3, 5–7, 6–3
Win	2–0	Aug 2024	M15 Monastir, Tunisia	WTT	Hard	(Turkey) Altuğ Çelikbilek	6–4, ret.
Loss	2–1	Oct 2024	M15 Pontevedra, Spain	WTT	Hard	(Australia) Matthew Dellavedova	3–6, 6–1, 1–6
Win	3–1	Jan 2026	M15 Manacor, Spain	WTT	Hard	(Bulgaria) Ivan Ivanov	6–2, 6–0
Win	4–1	Jan 2026	M15 Manacor, Spain	WTT	Hard	(Bulgaria) Ivan Ivanov	6–1, 6–4

=== Doubles: 5 (3 titles, 2 runner-ups) ===
Legend ITF WTT (3–2)	Finals by surface Hard (3–2) Clay (–)

Result	W–L	Date	Tournament	Tier	Surface	Partner	Opponents	Score
Loss	0–1	Jan 2024	M15 Manacor, Spain	WTT	Hard	(Hong Kong) Coleman Wong	(Spain) Carlos López Montagud (Lithuania) Edas Butvilas	2–6, 6–7^{(6–8)}
Loss	0–2	Oct 2024	M15 Pontevedra, Spain	WTT	Hard	(Bulgaria) Iliyan Radulov	(Spain) Rafael Izquierdo Luque (Spain) Iván Marrero Curbelo	3–6, 6–3, [6–10]
Win	1–2	Jan 2025	M15 Manacor, Spain	WTT	Hard	Daniil Sarksian	(Spain) Ignasi Forcano (Morocco) Younes Lalami Laaroussi	4–6, 6–4, [10–8]
Win	2–2	Apr 2025	M25 Sharm El Sheikh, Egypt	WTT	Hard	(United Kingdom) Ryan Peniston	(Czech Republic) David Poljak (United Kingdom) Hamish Stewart	6–2, 3–6, [11–9]
Win	3–2	Jan 2026	M15 Manacor, Spain	WTT	Hard	(Spain) Daniel Rincón	(United Kingdom) Joe Leather (Republic of Ireland) Conor Gannon	6–3, 6–3

== Junior Grand Slam finals ==
=== Singles: 1 (runner-up) ===
Result	Year	Tournament	Surface	Opponent	Score
Loss	2023	Wimbledon	Grass	(United Kingdom) Henry Searle	4–6, 4–6

=== Doubles: 1 (title) ===
Result	Year	Tournament	Surface	Partner	Opponents	Score
Win	2023	French Open	Clay	(Mexico) Rodrigo Pacheco Méndez	(Italy) Lorenzo Sciahbasi (Italy) Gabriele Vulpitta	6–2, 6–3
