= ENKA Open Challenger =

ENKA Open
- 2026 ENKA Open

ATP Challenger Tour
- Location: İstinye, Istanbul, Turkey
- Venue: Enka Spor Kulübü
- Category: ATP Challenger Tour
- Surface: Hard
- Website: Website

The ENKA Open is a professional tennis tournament played on hardcourts. It is currently part of the ATP Challenger Tour. It was first held in Istanbul, Turkey in 2026.

== Past finals ==
=== Singles ===
Year	Champion	Runner-up	Score
2026	(France) Lucas Poullain	Ilia Simakin	5–7, 6–2, 6–3

=== Doubles ===
Year	Champions	Runners-up	Score
2026	(Turkey) Arda Azkara (United Kingdom) James MacKinlay	Sergey Betov; Ilia Simakin	6–3, 6–1

== See also ==
- ENKA Open - WTA 125 event also held at the ENKA Sports Club in July
- Istanbul Challenger – ATP Challenger tournament
- İstanbul Open - WTA 125 event also held in İstinye, Istanbul, in May
- Istanbul Open - ATP Tour event (2015–2018)
