= Park Ui-sung =

South Korean tennis player (born 2000)

Park Ui-sung 박의성
- Country (sports): South Korea
- Born: 27 September 2000 (age 26) Seoul, South Korea
- Plays: Right-handed (two-handed backhand)
- Prize money: $66,879

Singles
- Career record: 0–0 (at ATP Tour level, Grand Slam level, and in Davis Cup)
- Career titles: 0
- Highest ranking: No. 546 (26 June 2023)
- Current ranking: No. 712 (30 March 2026)

Grand Slam singles results
- Australian Open Junior: 1R (2018)
- French Open Junior: 2R (2017)
- Wimbledon Junior: 1R (2017)
- US Open Junior: 3R (2017)

Doubles
- Career record: 1–1 (at ATP Tour level, Grand Slam level, and in Davis Cup)
- Career titles: 0
- Highest ranking: No. 212 (30 March 2026)
- Current ranking: No. 212 (30 March 2026)

Grand Slam doubles results
- French Open Junior: 2R (2017)
- Wimbledon Junior: 2R (2017)
- US Open Junior: 1R (2017)
Medal record
Men's tennis
Representing South Korea
Asian Games
| Silver medal – second place | 2026 Aichi–Nagoya | Doubles |
- Last updated on: 2 October 2026.

- Park Ui-sung
- Hangul: 박의성
- RR: Bak Uiseong
- MR: Pak Ŭisŏng

Park Ui-sung (Korean: 박의성; born 27 September 2000) is a South Korean tennis player. He has a career-high ranking of No. 546 achieved on 26 June 2023 and a doubles ranking of No. 212 achieved on 30 March 2026.

Park has a career high ITF junior combined ranking of No. 3 achieved on 1 January 2018.

== Challenger and World Tennis Tour Finals ==
=== Singles: 6 (3-3) ===
| Legend (singles) ATP Challenger Tour (0-0) ITF World Tennis Tour (3-3) | Titles by surface Hard (3–3) Clay (0-0) Grass (0–0) Carpet (0–0) |

| Result | W–L | Date | Tournament | Tier | Surface | Opponent | Score |
|---|---|---|---|---|---|---|---|
| Loss | 0–1 | Mar 2022 | M15 Sharm El Sheikh, Egypt | World Tennis Tour | Hard | (Georgia (country)) Saba Purtseladze | 4–6, 4–6 |
| Win | 1–1 | Sep 2022 | M15 Daegu, South Korea | World Tennis Tour | Hard | (South Korea) Kim Cheong-Eui | 6–3, 6–4 |
| Win | 2–1 | Jun 2023 | M25 Daegu, South Korea | World Tennis Tour | Hard | (South Korea) Lee Jea-moon | 6–3, 7–5 |
| Loss | 2–2 | May 2025 | M15 Daegu, South Korea | World Tennis Tour | Hard | (South Korea) Nam Ji-sung | 1–6, 2–6 |
| Win | 3–2 | May 2026 | M15 Wuning, China | World Tennis Tour | Hard | (Japan) Taisei Ichikawa | 6–2, 6–3 |
| Loss | 3–3 | May 2026 | M15 Wuning, China | World Tennis Tour | Hard | (Australia) Jake Delaney | 5–7, 4–6 |

=== Doubles: 27 (13–13) ===
| Legend (singles) ATP Challenger Tour (2–2) ITF World Tennis Tour (11–12) | Titles by surface Hard (12–10) Clay (1–4) Grass (0–0) Carpet (0–0) |

| Result | W–L | Date | Tournament | Tier | Surface | Partner | Opponents | Score |
|---|---|---|---|---|---|---|---|---|
| Loss | 0–1 | Dec 2018 | Turkey F38, Antalya | Futures | Clay | (South Korea) Jeong Yeong-Seok | (Brazil) Wilson Leite (Belgium) Jeroen Vanneste | 2-6, 2–6 |
| Loss | 0–2 | May 2019 | M15 Cairo, Egypt | World Tennis Tour | Clay | (South Korea) Jeong Yeong-Seok | (Russia) Alexander Igoshin (Portugal) Bernardo Saraiva | 6-4, 2–6, [4–10] |
| Loss | 0–3 | Jun 2019 | M15 Anseong, South Korea | World Tennis Tour | Clay | (South Korea) Jeong Yeong-Seok | (Japan) Haru Inoue (Japan) Ryota Tanuma | (W/O) |
| Win | 1–3 | Jun 2021 | M15 Monastir, Tunisia | World Tennis Tour | Hard | (India) Siddhant Banthia | (Australia) Jeremy Beale (New Zealand) Ajeet Rai | (W/O) |
| Loss | 1–4 | Nov 2021 | M15 Heraklion, Greece | World Tennis Tour | Hard | (United Kingdom) Harry Wendelken | (Sweden) Filip Bergevi (Germany) Kai Wehnelt | 6–7^{(8–10)}, 6–4, [7–10] |
| Loss | 1–5 | Mar 2022 | M15 Sharm El Sheikh, Egypt | World Tennis Tour | Hard | (Uzbekistan) Sergey Fomin | (Czech Republic) Jiri Barnat (Czech Republic) Filip Duda | 3–6, 2–6 |
| Loss | 1–6 | Jun 2022 | M15 Tay Ninh, Vietnam | World Tennis Tour | Hard | (South Korea) Son Ji Hoon | (Philippines) Francis Casey Alcantara (Vietnam) Lý Hoàng Nam | 3–6, 1–6 |
| Win | 2–6 | Nov 2022 | M25 Sharm El Sheikh, Egypt | World Tennis Tour | Hard | (South Korea) Jeong Yeong-Seok | (Italy) Jacopo Berrettini (Italy) Francesco Forti | 6–1, 7–6^{(11–9)} |
| Win | 3–6 | Jun 2023 | M25 Daegu, South Korea | World Tennis Tour | Hard | (South Korea) Jeong Yeong-Seok | (South Korea) Cho Seung Woo (South Korea) Kim Dong Ju | 2–6, 6–0, [10–5] |
| Win | 4–6 | Oct 2024 | M25 Huzhou, China | World Tennis Tour | Hard | (South Korea) Jeong Yeong-seok | (China) Li Zekai (China) Jin Yuquan | 7–6^{(9–7)}, 6–1 |
| Loss | 4–7 | Jan 2025 | M25 Bhopal, India | World Tennis Tour | Hard | (South Korea) Jeong Yeong-seok | (India) Chirag Duhan (India) Dev Javia | 6–4, 1–6, [2–10] |
| Win | 5–7 | Mar 2025 | M15 Nonthaburi, Thailand | World Tennis Tour | Hard | (South Korea) Jeong Yeong-seok | (Thailand) Thanapet Chanta (Thailand) Yuttana Charoenphon | 2–6, 6–2, [10–4] |
| Win | 6–7 | Apr 2025 | M15 Lu'an, China | World Tennis Tour | Hard | (South Korea) Jeong Yeong-seok | (Chinese Taipei) Hsieh Cheng-peng (China) Yang Mingyuan | 6–4, 3–6, [10–8] |
| Win | 7–7 | May 2025 | M25 Baotou, China | World Tennis Tour | Clay (i) | (South Korea) Jeong Yeong-seok | (China) Jin Yuquan (China) Li Zekai | 6–4, 7–6^{(7–4)} |
| Win | 8–7 | May 2025 | M15 Lu'an, China | World Tennis Tour | Hard | (Chinese Taipei) Huang Tsung-hao | (China) Liu Shaoyun (China) Lu Pengyu | 6–1, 7–5 |
| Loss | 8–8 | May 2025 | M15 Daegu, South Korea | World Tennis Tour | Hard | (South Korea) Kwon Soon-woo | (Japan) Yusuke Kusuhara (Japan) Shunsuke Nakagawa | 3–6, 4–6 |
| Loss | 8–9 | Jun 2025 | M25 Changwon, South Korea | World Tennis Tour | Hard | (South Korea) Jeong Yeong-seok | (South Korea) Chung Hong (South Korea) Son Ji-hoon | 4–6, 2–6 |
| Loss | 8–10 | Jun 2025 | M25 Luzhou, China | World Tennis Tour | Hard | (South Korea) Jeong Yeong-seok | (Switzerland) Luca Castelnuovo (China) Zheng Baoluo | 6–3, 6–7^{(3–7)}, [4–10] |
| Win | 9–10 | Jul 2025 | M15 Nakhon Pathom, Thailand | World Tennis Tour | Hard | (Thailand) Wishaya Trongcharoenchaikul | (Australia) Jake Delaney (Japan) Ryotaro Taguchi | 7–6^{(7–5)}, 2–6, [10–6] |
| Loss | 9–11 | Jul 2025 | Astana, Kazakhstan | Challenger | Hard | (Philippines) Francis Alcantara | (Japan) Taisei Ichikawa (Japan) Kokoro Isomura | 5–7, 6–2, [5–10] |
| Win | 10–11 | Aug 2025 | M15 Ma'anshan, China | World Tennis Tour | Hard (i) | (South Korea) Nam Ji-sung | (South Korea) Cho Seong-woo (China) Yang Zijiang | 6–3, 4–6, [10–7] |
| Loss | 10–12 | Sep 2025 | Jingshan, China | Challenger | Clay | (Chinese Taipei) Huang Tsung-hao | (India) Anirudh Chandrasekar (United States) Reese Stalder | 2–6, 6–2, [7–10] |
| Win | 11–12 | Jan 2026 | Phan Thiết, Vietnam | Challenger | Hard | (South Korea) Nam Ji-sung | (Australia) Joshua Charlton (Spain) Iván Marrero Curbelo | 6–4, 6–3 |
| Loss | 11–13 | Mar 2026 | M15 Ma'anshan, China | World Tennis Tour | Hard (i) | (Chinese Taipei) Hsieh Cheng-peng | (United States) Andre Ilagan (United States) Evan Zhu | 3–6, 3–6 |
| Win | 12–13 | May 2026 | M15 Wuning, China | World Tennis Tour | Hard | (South Korea) Choe Jae-sung | (Australia) Lachlan McFadzean (Australia) Ashton McLeod | 6–3, 6–3 |
| Loss | 12–14 | May 2026 | M15 Wuning, China | World Tennis Tour | Hard | (South Korea) Choe Jae-sung | (Australia) Jake Delaney (Australia) Jesse Delaney | 2–6, 7–6(7–4), [7–10] |
| Win | 13–14 | Aug 2026 | Zhangjiagang, China | Challenger | Hard | (South Korea) Nam Ji-sung | (Australia) Joshua Charlton (China) Wang Aoran | 6–3, 4–6, [13–11] |
