= Wuning Challenger =

Wuning Open
- 2026 Wuning Challenger

ATP Challenger Tour
- Event name: Wuning Open
- Location: Wuning, China
- Category: ATP Challenger Tour
- Surface: Hard

The Wuning Open is a professional tennis tournament played on hardcourts. It is currently part of the ATP Challenger Tour. It was first held in Wuning, China in 2026 in three editions.

== Past finals ==
=== Singles ===
Year	Champion	Runner-up	Score
2026 (3)	Alibek Kachmazov	(Japan) Jay Friend	4–6, 7–6^{(9–7)}, 7–6^{(8–6)}
2026 (2)	(China) Sun Fajing	(Australia) Li Tu	5–7, 6–4, 7–5
2026 (1)	Pavel Kotov	(United Kingdom) Harry Wendelken	4–6, 6–3, 6–4

=== Doubles ===
Year	Champions	Runners-up	Score
2026 (3)	(Japan) Akira Santillan (China) Zheng Baoluo	Yaroslav Demin; Timofei Derepasko	3–6, 6–3, [10–4]
2026 (2)	(Chinese Taipei) Jason Jung (Japan) Kaito Uesugi	(United States) Keegan Smith (China) Zheng Baoluo	6–7^{(3–7)}, 6–3, [10–6]
2026 (1)	(Australia) Joshua Charlton (United Kingdom) Ben Jones	(Belgium) Buvaysar Gadamauri (United Kingdom) Giles Hussey	6–4, 6–2
