= Phan Thiết Challenger =

- 2026 Phan Thiết Challenger

ATP Challenger Tour
- Location: Phan Thiết, Vietnam
- Venue: NovaWorld International Tennis Complex
- Category: ATP Challenger Tour
- Surface: Hard

The Phan Thiết Challenger is a professional tennis tournament played on hardcourts. It is currently part of the ATP Challenger Tour. It was first held in Phan Thiết, Vietnam in 2026 in four editions.

== Past finals ==
=== Singles ===
Year	Champion	Runner-up	Score
2026 (4)	Ilia Simakin	(Mexico) Rodrigo Pacheco Méndez	6–7^{(4–7)}, 6–4, 6–3
2026 (3)	Ilia Simakin	(France) Arthur Weber	6–4, 7–6^{(7–5)}
2026 (2)	Ilia Simakin	(China) Zhou Yi	7–5, 6–4
2026 (1)	(South Korea) Kwon Soon-woo	Ilia Simakin	6–2, 7–6^{(7–5)}

=== Doubles ===
Year	Champions	Runners-up	Score
2026 (4)	(France) Constantin Bittoun Kouzmine (India) S D Prajwal Dev	(Australia) Joshua Charlton (Japan) Yuta Shimizu	6–4, 7–6^{(7–1)}
2026 (3)	(France) Constantin Bittoun Kouzmine (India) S D Prajwal Dev	(Japan) Yamato Sueoka (Japan) Naoki Tajima	6–1, 7–6^{(7–0)}
2026 (2)	(South Korea) Nam Ji-sung (South Korea) Park Ui-sung	(Australia) Joshua Charlton (Spain) Iván Marrero Curbelo	6–4, 6–3
2026 (1)	(Japan) James Trotter (Japan) Kaito Uesugi	(United States) George Goldhoff (United States) Reese Stalder	6–3, 5–7, [10–4]
