= Zhou Yi (tennis) =

Chinese tennis player (born 2005)

- Zhou at the 2026 Wimbledon Championships
- Country (sports): China
- Born: 14 March 2005 (age 21) Beijing, China
- Height: 1.93 m (6 ft 4 in)
- Plays: Right-handed (two-handed backhand)
- Coach: Philip Bester
- Prize money: US $595,590

Singles
- Career record: 9–11 (at ATP Tour level, Grand Slam level, and in Davis Cup)
- Career titles: 0
- Highest ranking: No. 217 (25 May 2026)
- Current ranking: No. 280 (19 October 2026)

Grand Slam singles results
- French Open: Q1 (2026)
- Wimbledon: Q3 (2026)

Doubles
- Career record: 6–9 (at ATP Tour level, Grand Slam level, and in Davis Cup)
- Career titles: 0
- Highest ranking: No. 284 (19 October 2026)
- Current ranking: No. 284 (19 October 2026)
- Last updated on: 19 October 2026.

Zhou Yi (born 14 March 2005) is a Chinese tennis player. He has a career-high ATP singles ranking of No. 217 achieved on 25 May 2026 and a doubles ranking of No. 284 achieved on 19 October 2026.

Zhou reached an ITF junior combined ranking of world No. 3 on 29 May 2023.

== Early life ==
Zhou was born in Beijing and began playing tennis at the age of 10; he had played badminton before picking up tennis. He also goes by the English name Justin.

== Career ==
Zhou made his ATP main draw debut at the 2023 Zhuhai Championships after receiving a wildcard for the singles main draw. He also received singles and doubles main draw wildcards for the 2023 China Open, and the 2024 Chengdu Open where he recorded his first ATP singles win over Tseng Chun-hsin. As a result, he moved close to a 100 positions up in the top 450, having had a ranking of No. 531 at the start of the tournament.

He received wildcards for the main draw in singles and doubles for the 2024 China Open, and the 2024 Shanghai Masters for his debut at this tournament and at the ATP 1000-level. Ranked No. 440, he advanced to the second round after his opponent, Yoshihito Nishioka retired due to injury, recording his first Masters 1000 win. As a result, he climbed 60 positions up in the rankings into the top 380 on 14 October 2024. He lost to 13th seed Frances Tiafoe.

Ranked No. 304, Zhou received a wildcard for the 2025 Chengdu Open and defeated fifth seed and world No. 34 Cameron Norrie in the first round. It was his highest-ranked win at the time.

In October 2026, Zhou, ranked world No. 277, defeated world No. 25 Lorenzo Musetti in the second round of the 2026 Shanghai Masters, recording his highest-ranked win. He became the third-lowest-ranked player to reach the third round in the tournament's history, after Wu Yibing (No. 560) and Yosuke Watanuki (No. 336), both in 2024.

== National representation ==
Zhou represents China at the Davis Cup, where he has a W/L record of 2–1. He helped lead China to victory over Slovenia to reach World Group II finals in 2024.

== Performance timeline ==
Key
W	F	SF	QF	#R	RR	Q#	DNQ	A	NH

(W) winner; (F) finalist; (SF) semifinalist; (QF) quarterfinalist; (#R) rounds 4, 3, 2, 1; (RR) round-robin stage; (Q#) qualification round; (DNQ) did not qualify; (A) absent; (NH) not held; (SR) strike rate (events won / competed); (W–L) win–loss record.

=== Singles ===
Tournament	2023	2024	2025	2026	SR	W–L	Win%
Grand Slam tournaments
Australian Open	A	A	A	A	0 / 0	0–0	–
French Open	A	A	A	Q1	0 / 0	0–0	–
Wimbledon	A	A	A	Q3	0 / 0	0–0	–
US Open	A	A	A	A	0 / 0	0–0	–
Win–loss	0–0	0–0	0–0	0–0	0 / 0	0–0	–
ATP Masters 1000
Indian Wells Masters	A	A	A	A	0 / 0	0–0	–
Miami Open	A	A	A	A	0 / 0	0–0	–
Monte Carlo Masters	A	A	A	A	0 / 0	0–0	–
Madrid Open	A	A	A	A	0 / 0	0-0	–
Italian Open	A	A	A	A	0 / 0	0–0	–
Canadian Open	A	A	A	A	0 / 0	0–0	–
Cincinnati Masters	A	A	A	A	0 / 0	0–0	–
Shanghai Masters	Q1	2R	1R	3R	0 / 2	3–3	50%
Paris Masters	A	A	A		0 / 0	0–0	–
Win–loss	0–0	0–0	1–2	0–0	0 / 2	1–2	33%

== ATP Challenger Tour finals ==
=== Singles: 3 (3 runner-ups) ===
Legend ATP Challenger Tour (0–3)

Result	W–L	Date	Tournament	Tier	Surface	Opponent	Score
Loss	0–1	Jun 2025	Tyler Championships, US	Challenger	Hard	(China) Wu Yibing	4–6, 6–3, 3–6
Loss	0–2	Oct 2025	Shenzhen Futian Open, China	Challenger	Hard	(France) Kyrian Jacquet	3–6, 3–6
Loss	0–3	Jan 2026	Phan Thiết Challenger II, Vietnam	Challenger	Hard	Ilia Simakin	5–7, 4–6

=== Doubles: 1 (runner-up) ===
Legend ATP Challenger Tour (0–1)

Result	W–L	Date	Tournament	Tier	Surface	Partner	Opponents	Score
Loss	0–1	Apr 2024	Shenzhen Luohu Challenger, China	Challenger	Hard	(China) Wang Aoran	(Japan) Yuta Shimizu (Japan) James Trotter	6–7^{(5–7)}, 6–7^{(4–7)}

== ITF World Tennis Tour finals ==
=== Singles: 3 (2 titles, 1 runner-up) ===
Legend ITF WTT (2–1)

Result	W–L	Date	Tournament	Tier	Surface	Opponent	Score
Loss	0–1	Jun 2024	M25 Luzhou, China	WTT	Hard	(China) Bai Yan	6–7^{(4–7)}, 6–7^{(6–8)}
Win	1–1	Jul 2024	M15 Tianjin, China	WTT	Hard	Evgeny Donskoy	6–3, 6–4
Win	2–1	Jul 2024	M25 Tianjin, China	WTT	Hard	(China) Sun Fajing	4–6, 6–3, 7–5
