= Wuning County =

Wuning County 武宁县
- County
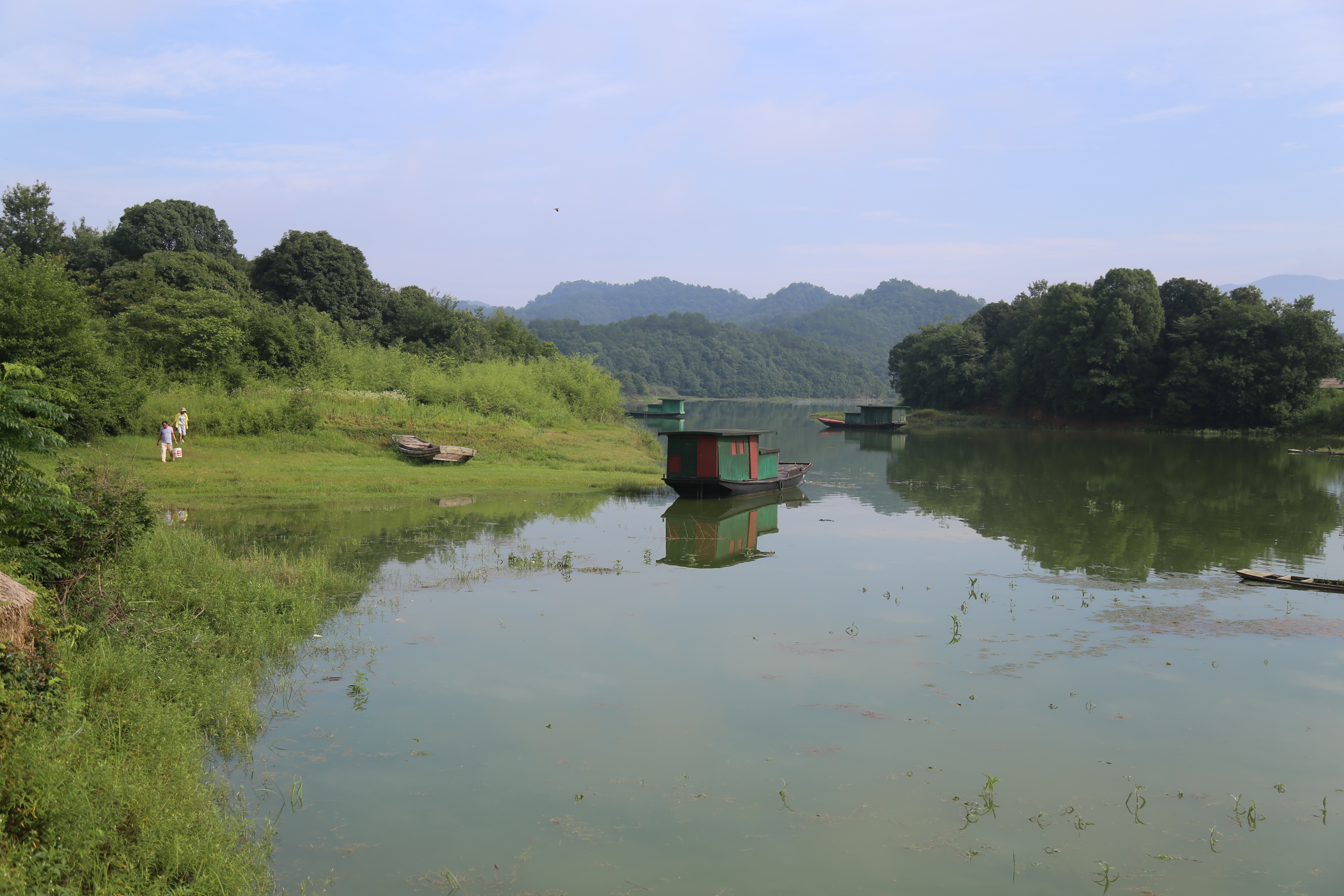

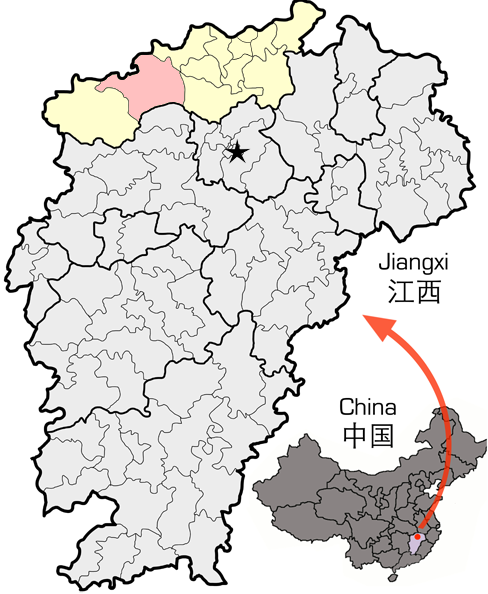
- Location of Wuning County (red) within Jiujiang City (yellow) and Jiangxi
- Coordinates: 29°14′49″N 115°05′35″E
- Country: People's Republic of China
- Province: Jiangxi
- Prefecture-level city: Jiujiang

Area
  - Total: 3,507 km^{2} (1,354 sq mi)

Population (2018)
  - Total: 408,300
  - Density: 116.4/km^{2} (301.5/sq mi)
- Time zone: UTC+8 (China Standard)
- Postal code: 332300

Wuning County (simplified Chinese: 武宁县; traditional Chinese: 武寧縣; pinyin: Wǔníng Xiàn) is a county in the northwest of Jiangxi Province, China, bordering Hubei Province to the north. It is under the administration of the prefecture-level city of Jiujiang.

== Administrative divisions ==
Wuning County has one subdistrict, 8 towns and 11 townships.

1 subdistrict

- Yuning (豫宁街道)

8 towns

- Xinning (新宁镇)
- Quankou (泉口镇)
- Luxi (鲁溪镇)
- Chuantan (穿滩镇)
- Lixi (澧溪镇)
- Luoping (罗坪镇)
- Shimenlou (石门楼镇)
- Songxi (宋溪镇)

11 townships

- Dadong (大洞乡)
- Henglu (横路乡)
- Gonglian (宫莲乡)
- Jinkou (巾口乡)
- Donglin (东林乡)
- Shangtang (上汤乡)
- Futian (甫田乡)
- Qingjiang (清江乡)
- Shidu (石渡乡)
- Yangzhou (杨洲乡)
- Luoxi (罗溪乡)

== Climate ==
Climate data for Wuning, elevation 116 m (381 ft), (1991–2020 normals, extremes 1981–present)
Month	Jan	Feb	Mar	Apr	May	Jun	Jul	Aug	Sep	Oct	Nov	Dec	Year
Record high °C (°F)	24.3 (75.7)	27.6 (81.7)	33.3 (91.9)	34.0 (93.2)	37.5 (99.5)	37.9 (100.2)	40.8 (105.4)	41.7 (107.1)	39.7 (103.5)	35.9 (96.6)	30.0 (86.0)	22.6 (72.7)	41.7 (107.1)
Mean daily maximum °C (°F)	9.0 (48.2)	11.7 (53.1)	16.1 (61.0)	22.6 (72.7)	27.1 (80.8)	29.8 (85.6)	33.5 (92.3)	33.2 (91.8)	29.3 (84.7)	24.1 (75.4)	17.9 (64.2)	11.8 (53.2)	22.2 (71.9)
Daily mean °C (°F)	5.1 (41.2)	7.4 (45.3)	11.3 (52.3)	17.3 (63.1)	22.1 (71.8)	25.3 (77.5)	28.5 (83.3)	28.1 (82.6)	24.4 (75.9)	18.9 (66.0)	12.9 (55.2)	7.3 (45.1)	17.4 (63.3)
Mean daily minimum °C (°F)	2.2 (36.0)	4.2 (39.6)	7.9 (46.2)	13.4 (56.1)	18.3 (64.9)	22.0 (71.6)	24.9 (76.8)	24.6 (76.3)	20.8 (69.4)	15.1 (59.2)	9.2 (48.6)	3.9 (39.0)	13.9 (57.0)
Record low °C (°F)	−6.4 (20.5)	−5.1 (22.8)	−1.9 (28.6)	0.8 (33.4)	8.9 (48.0)	13.6 (56.5)	18.5 (65.3)	18.6 (65.5)	11.6 (52.9)	1.6 (34.9)	−1.1 (30.0)	−8.7 (16.3)	−8.7 (16.3)
Average precipitation mm (inches)	80.3 (3.16)	93.9 (3.70)	155.5 (6.12)	190.0 (7.48)	207.3 (8.16)	248.6 (9.79)	185.8 (7.31)	117.9 (4.64)	78.8 (3.10)	63.0 (2.48)	71.4 (2.81)	47.2 (1.86)	1,539.7 (60.61)
Average precipitation days (≥ 0.1 mm)	13.1	12.5	16.3	15.7	15.3	15.3	12.8	11.8	8.4	8.4	10.1	9.7	149.4
Average snowy days	3.8	2.4	0.5	0	0	0	0	0	0	0	0.2	1.4	8.3
Average relative humidity (%)	78	78	79	78	79	83	79	78	76	74	76	74	78
Mean monthly sunshine hours	78.1	80.9	97.6	122.4	137.5	122.0	191.7	184.9	151.2	142.0	120.2	113.5	1,542
Percentage possible sunshine	24	25	26	32	33	29	45	46	41	40	38	36	35
Source: China Meteorological Administration
