= Phan Thiết =

Ward in Lâm Đồng, Vietnam

- Ward
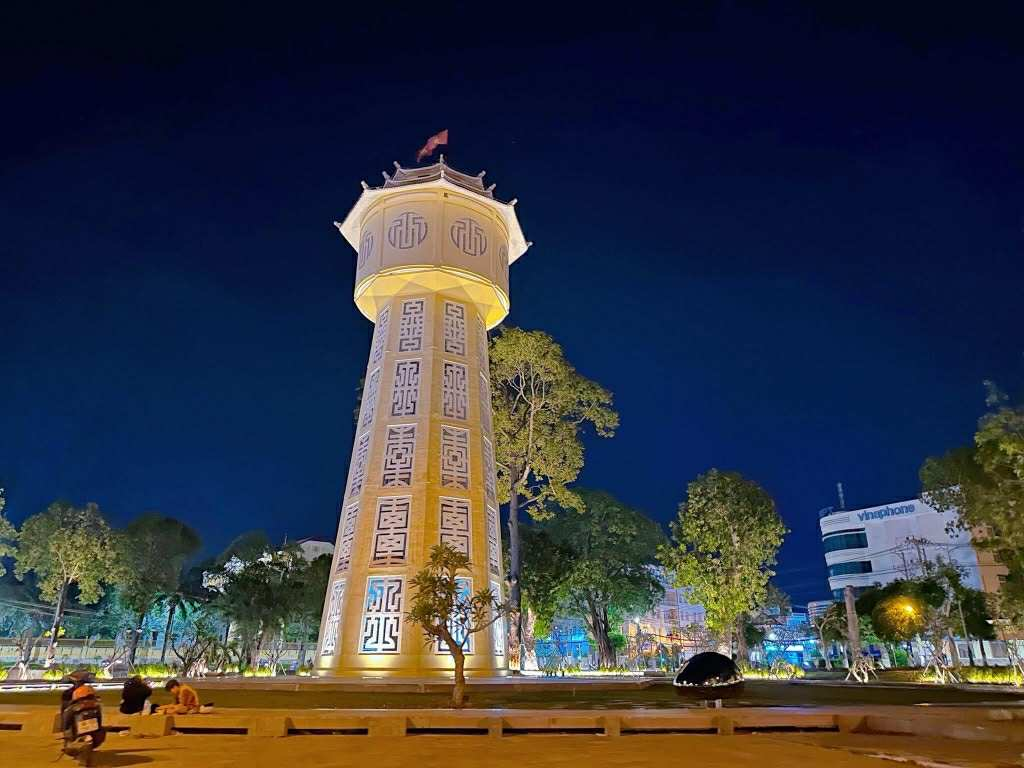
- Phan Thiết water tower at night
- Interactive map of Phan Thiết
- Coordinates: 10°55′42″N 108°06′13″E
- Country: Vietnam
- Province: Lâm Đồng

Area
  - Total: 1.72 sq mi (4.46 km^{2})

Population
  - Total: 85.493
  - Density: 49.64/sq mi (19.168/km^{2})
- Time zone: UTC+07:00 (UTC + 7)
- Area code: 22945
- Website: phanthiet.lamdong.gov.vn

Phan Thiết is a ward of Lâm Đồng province, Vietnam. It is one of the 124 new wards, communes and special zones of the province following the reorganization in 2025.

On June 16, 2025, the Standing Committee of the National Assembly issued Resolution No. 1671/NQ-UBTVQH15 on the reorganization of commune-level administrative units in Lâm Đồng Province in 2025 (effective from June 16, 2025). Accordingly, the entire natural area and population of Phú Trinh, Lạc Đạo and Bình Hưng wards of the Phan Thiết city were consolidated into a new ward named Phan Thiết ward.
