= Naoki Tajima =

Japanese tennis player (born 2000)

- Country (sports): Japan
- Born: 21 September 2000 (age 25) Kumamoto, Japan
- Plays: Right-handed (two-handed backhand)
- Prize money: $77,503

Singles
- Career record: 0–0
- Career titles: 0
- Highest ranking: No. 603 (20 January 2020)
- Current ranking: No. 1,419 (16 February 2026)

Grand Slam singles results
- Australian Open Junior: 1R (2018)
- French Open Junior: 2R (2018)
- Wimbledon Junior: 1R (2018)
- US Open Junior: QF (2017)

Doubles
- Career record: 0–0
- Career titles: 0
- Highest ranking: No. 245 (16 February 2026)
- Current ranking: No. 245 (16 February 2026)

Grand Slam doubles results
- Australian Open Junior: QF (2018)
- French Open Junior: W (2018)
- Wimbledon Junior: SF (2018)
- Last updated on: 16 February 2026.

Naoki Tajima (田島 尚輝, Tajima Naoki; born 21 September 2000) is a Japanese tennis player.

Tajima has a career high ATP singles ranking of No. 603 achieved on 20 January 2021 and a doubles rankings of No. 245 achieved on 16 February 2026.

Tajima won the 2018 French Open – Boys' doubles title.

== ATP Challenger and ITF Futures finals ==
=== Singles: 2 (0–2) ===
Legend ATP Challenger (0–0) ITF Futures (0–2)	Finals by surface Hard (0–1) Clay (0–1) Grass (0–0) Carpet (0–0)

Result	W–L	Date	Tournament	Tier	Surface	Opponent	Score
Loss	0–1	Jan 2019	M15 Anning, China	World Tennis Tour	Clay	(Argentina) Agustín Velotti	6–4, 3–6, 5–7
Loss	0–2	May 2021	M15 Kouvola, Finland	World Tennis Tour	Hard	(United Kingdom) Anton Matusevich	1–6, 6–4, 0–6

=== Doubles: 30 (8–22) ===
Legend ATP Challenger (1–1) World Tennis Tour (7–21)	Finals by surface Hard (7–17) Clay (1–5) Grass (0–0) Carpet (0–0)

Result	W–L	Date	Tournament	Tier	Surface	Partner	Opponents	Score
Win	1–0	Jan 2019	M15 Anning, China	World Tennis Tour	Clay	(Japan) Kento Takeuchi	(Italy) Francesco Bessire (Argentina) Agustín Velotti	4–6, 7–5, [10–7]
Win	2–0	Apr 2019	M25 Matsuyama, Japan	World Tennis Tour	Hard	(Japan) Shinji Hazawa	(South Korea) Cheong-Eui Kim (South Korea) Ji Sung Nam	4–6, 6–1, [10–7]
Loss	2–1	Jan 2021	M15 Cairo, Egypt	World Tennis Tour	Clay	(Spain) Jose Francisco Vidal Azorin	(Italy) Franco Agamenone (Poland) Piotr Matuszewski	6–4, 6–7^{(5–7)}, [7–10]
Loss	2–2	Apr 2021	M15 St. Petersburg, Russia	World Tennis Tour	Hard	(Russia) Alexey Zakharov	(Moldova) Alexandr Cozbinov (Sweden) Simon Freund	4–6, 5–7
Loss	2–3	Apr 2021	M15 St. Petersburg, Russia	World Tennis Tour	Hard	(Russia) Alexey Zakharov	(Moldova) Alexandr Cozbinov (Sweden) Simon Freund	6–7^{5–7}, 6–2, [6–10]
Loss	2–4	Oct 2021	M15 Cancún, Mexico	World Tennis Tour	Hard	(Japan) Sho Shimabukuro	(India) Siddhant Banthia (Japan) Seita Watanabe	6–1, 4–6, [3–10]
Win	3–4	Oct 2021	M15 Cancún, Mexico	World Tennis Tour	Hard	(Japan) Sho Shimabukuro	(Dominican Republic) Peter Bertran (United States) Mwendwa Mbithi	7–6^{(7–5)}, 6–4
Win	4–4	Jan 2022	M15 Monastir, Tunesia	World Tennis Tour	Hard	(Japan) Kaito Uesugi	(Belgium) Loic Cloes (Ukraine) Marat Deviatiarov	(W/O)
Win	5–4	Jan 2022	M15 Monastir, Tunesia	World Tennis Tour	Hard	(Japan) Kaito Uesugi	(France) Martin Breysach (France) Arthur Bouquier	6–2 7–6^{(7–5)}
Loss	5–5	Feb 2022	M25 Canberra, Australia	World Tennis Tour	Hard	(Australia) Calum Puttergill	(New Zealand) Rubin Statham (Australia) Akira Santillan	4–6 3–6
Loss	5–6	May 2022	M15 Antalya, Turkey	World Tennis Tour	Clay	(Japan) Yuta Shimizu	(Spain) Juan Pablo Canas Garcia (Spain) Pablo Llamas Ruiz	4–6 5–7
Loss	5–7	Sep 2022	M25 Sapporo, Japan	World Tennis Tour	Hard	(Japan) Rimpei Kawakami	(Japan) Takuto Niki (Japan) Takeru Yuzuki	6–3, 4–6, [8–10]
Loss	5–8	Oct 2022	M25 Kashiwa, Japan	World Tennis Tour	Hard	(Japan) Seita Watanabe	(Japan) Toshihide Matsui (Japan) Kaito Uesugi	3–6, 6–4, [5–10]
Loss	5–9	Jan 2023	M15 Jakarta, Indonesia	World Tennis Tour	Hard	(Japan) Keisuke Saitoh	(India) Rivik Choudary Bollipalli (India) Niki Kaliyanda Poonacha	1–6, 3–6
Loss	5–10	Feb 2023	M15 Monastir, Tunesia	World Tennis Tour	Hard	(Japan) Ryuki Matsuda	(Germany) Tim Handel (Switzerland) Yannik Steinegger	4–6, 1–6
Loss	5–11	Jun 2023	M25 Anseong, South Korea	World Tennis Tour	Clay	(Japan) Shunsuke Mitsui	(South Korea) Chung Yun-seong (Japan) Takeru Yuzuki	6–7^{(3–7)}, 4–6
Win	6–11	Jul 2023	M15 Caloundra, Australia	World Tennis Tour	Hard	(Japan) Keisuke Saitoh	(Australia) Jesse Delaney (Australia) Dayne Kelly	6–3, 6–1
Win	6–12	Oct 2023	M15 Cairns, Australia	World Tennis Tour	Hard	(Japan) Kokoro Isomura	(Australia) Kody Pearson (United States) Henrik Wiersholm	2–6, 1–6
Win	7–12	Jan 2024	M15 Doha, Qatar	World Tennis Tour	Hard	(Japan) Masamichi Imamura	(Morocco) Elliot Benchetrit (France) Antoine Ghibaudo	6–2, 6–3
Loss	7–13	Jan 2024	M15 Doha, Qatar	World Tennis Tour	Hard	(Japan) Masamichi Imamura	(Turkey) Yanki Erel (Turkey) Ergi Kirkin	6–4, 3–6, [2–10]
Loss	7–14	Jun 2024	M15 Anseong, South Korea	World Tennis Tour	Hard	(Australia) Ethan Cook	(Japan) Kenta Miyoshi (Australia) Edward Winter	3–6, 7–5, [6–10]
Loss	7–15	Aug 2024	M25 Aldershot, United Kingdom	World Tennis Tour	Hard	(Japan) Masamichi Imamura	(United Kingdom) James Davis (United Kingdom) Matthew Summers	6–4, 3–6, [10–12]
Loss	7–16	Sep 2024	M25 Takasaki, Japan	World Tennis Tour	Hard	(Japan) Keisuke Saitoh	(Japan) Yuta Kawahashi (Japan) Ryuki Matsuda	6–7^{(8–10)}, 7–6^{(7–5)}, [6–10]
Loss	7–17	Jan 2025	M25 Doha, Qatar	World Tennis Tour	Hard	(Japan) Yuta Kikuchi	(Belgium) Tibo Colson (Netherlands) Thijmen Loof	6–7^{(5–7)}, 4–6
Loss	7–18	Apr 2025	M25 Santa Margherita di Pula, Italy	World Tennis Tour	Clay	(Japan) Ryuki Matsuda	(Italy) Raúl Brancaccio (Spain) Àlex Martínez	3–6, 5–7
Loss	7–19	Apr 2025	M25 Santa Margherita di Pula, Italy	World Tennis Tour	Clay	(Japan) Ryuki Matsuda	(Italy) Giovanni Oradini (Italy) Marcello Serafini	6–4, 6–7^{(6–8)}, [6–10]
Win	8–19	May 2025	Tbilisi, Georgia	Challenger	Hard	(Japan) Masamichi Imamura	(India) Siddhant Banthia (India) Ramkumar Ramanathan	1–6, 6–3, [10–5]
Loss	8–20	Oct 2025	M25 Perth, Australia	World Tennis Tour	Hard	(Japan) Masamichi Imamura	(United Kingdom) Finn Bass (New Zealand) Ajeet Rai	1–6, 6–7^{(3–7)}
Loss	8–21	Mar 2027	M15 Nishitokyo, Japan	World Tennis Tour	Hard	(Japan) Shinji Hazawa	(Japan) Ryuki Matsuda (Japan) Hikaru Shiraishi	2–6, 6–1, [5–10]
Loss	8–22	Sep 2026	Phan Thiết, Vietnam	Challenger	Hard	(Japan) Yamato Sueoka	(France) Constantin Bittoun Kouzmine (India) S D Prajwal Dev	1–6, 6–7^{(0–7)}

== Junior Grand Slam finals ==
=== Doubles: 1 (1 title) ===
Result	Year	Tournament	Surface	Partner	Opponents	Score
Win	2018	(France) French Open	Clay	(Czech Republic) Ondřej Štyler	(Chinese Taipei) Ray Ho (Chinese Taipei) Tseng Chun-hsin	6–4, 6–4
