= Arthur Weber (tennis) =

French tennis player

- Country (sports): France
- Born: 9 May 1992 (age 34) Montpellier, France
- Height: 1.85 m (6 ft 1 in)
- Plays: Left-handed (two-handed backhand)
- Prize money: US $122,735

Singles
- Career record: 0–0
- Career titles: 1 Challenger, 9 Futures
- Highest ranking: No. 303 (16 October 2023)
- Current ranking: No. 433 (9 November 2026)

Doubles
- Career record: 0–0
- Career titles: 0
- Highest ranking: No. 588 (30 October 2023)
- Current ranking: No. 1,884 (9 November 2026)
- Last updated on: 9 November 2026.

Arthur Weber (born 9 May 1992) is a French tennis player who plays mainly on the ITF Futures Tour and the ATP Challenger Tour. Weber has a career high ATP singles ranking of No. 303 achieved on 16 October 2023 and a career high doubles ranking of No. 588 achieved on 30 October 2023.

Weber has won one Challenger title and achieved most of his career milestones after the age of 30.

== Professional career ==
=== 2022: First ITF title ===
In October, Weber won his first ITF title in Jakarta, Indonesia, defeating Thomas Fancutt in the final.

=== 2023: Maiden Challenger title ===
In August, Weber won his maiden Challenger title at the 2023 Zhuhai Challenger, defeating second seed Jason Jung in the final. At 31 years and 8 months, he became the oldest player to win in his debut Challenger tournament and also the fourth oldest player to win his maiden Challenger title.

=== 2026: Second Challenger final ===
In September, Weber reached his second Challenger final at the Phan Thiết Challenger III, losing to Ilia Simakin in the final.

== ATP Challenger and ITF Futures/World Tennis Tour finals ==
=== Singles: 19 (10 titles, 9 runner-ups) ===
Legend ATP Challenger (1–1) ITF Futures (9–8)	Finals by surface Hard (10–9) Clay (0–0) Grass (0–0)

Result	W–L	Date	Tournament	Tier	Surface	Opponent	Score
Win	1–0	Oct 2022	M25 Jakarta, Indonesia	World Tennis Tour	Hard	(Australia) Thomas Fancutt	7–6^{(11–9)}, 7–6^{(11–9)}
Loss	1–1	Oct 2022	M25 Jakarta, Indonesia	World Tennis Tour	Hard	(Chinese Taipei) Huang Tsung-hao	6–7^{(9–11)}, 4–6
Win	2–1	Jan 2023	M15 Jakarta, Indonesia	World Tennis Tour	Hard	(India) Sidharth Rawat	6–4, 3–6, 6–3
Loss	2–2	Apr 2023	M15 Singapore, Singapore	World Tennis Tour	Hard	(Australia) Dayne Kelly	5–7, 6–2, 6–7^{(6–8)}
Win	3–2	Jul 2023	M15 Nakhon Si Thammarat, Thailand	World Tennis Tour	Hard	(Thailand) Maximus Jones	6–2, 6–1
Win	4–2	Aug 2023	M25 Jakarta, Indonesia	World Tennis Tour	Hard	(Sweden) Leo Borg	4–6, 7–5, 7–5
Win	5–2	Aug 2023	Zhuhai, China	Challenger	Hard	(Chinese Taipei) Jason Jung	6–3, 5–7, 6–3
Loss	5–3	Dec 2024	M15 Bali, Indonesia	World Tennis Tour	Hard	(Japan) Renta Tokuda	6–7^{(6–8)}, 3–6
Loss	5–4	Dec 2024	M15 Bali, Indonesia	World Tennis Tour	Hard	(Japan) Hayato Matsuoka	4–6, 7–5, 2–6
Win	6–4	Aug 2025	M15 Hong Kong, Hong Kong	World Tennis Tour	Hard	(Australia) Sam Ryan Ziegann	6–2, 6–3
Win	7–4	Sep 2025	M15 Hong Kong, Hong Kong	World Tennis Tour	Hard	(Japan) Yuta Kawahashi	6–2, 6–3
Loss	7–5	Sep 2025	M25 Bali, Indonesia	World Tennis Tour	Hard	(United Kingdom) Max Basing	0–6, 2–6
Loss	7–6	Oct 2025	M15 Hua Hin, Thailand	World Tennis Tour	Hard	(Brazil) Igor Marcondes	5–7, 5–7
Loss	7–7	Oct 2025	M15 Hua Hin, Thailand	World Tennis Tour	Hard	(Brazil) Igor Marcondes	1–6, 1–6
Loss	7–8	Nov 2025	M15 Kuala Lumpur, Malaysia	World Tennis Tour	Hard	(Japan) Yuta Kawahashi	5–7, 4–6
Win	8–8	Nov 2025	M15 Phan Thiet, Vietnam	World Tennis Tour	Hard	(Thailand) Thanapet Chanta	6–0, 6–3
Win	9–8	Dec 2025	M15 Phan Thiet, Vietnam	World Tennis Tour	Hard	(United States) Braden Shick	6–4, 6–4
Win	10–8	Aug 2026	M15 Nonthaburi, Thailand	World Tennis Tour	Hard	(Australia) Moerani Bouzige	7–5, 7–6^{(7–5)}
Loss	10–9	Sep 2026	Phan Thiết III, Vietnam	Challenger	Hard	Ilia Simakin	4–6, 6–7^{(5-7)}

=== Doubles: 3 (0–3) ===
Legend ATP Challenger (0–0) ITF Futures (0–3)	Finals by surface Hard (0–0) Clay (0–3) Grass (0–0)

Result	W–L	Date	Tournament	Tier	Surface	Partner	Opponents	Score
Loss	0-1	Mar 2022	M15 Marrakesh, Morocco	World Tennis Tour	Clay	(France) Florent Bax	(Austria) Philip Bachmayer (Russia) Ilya Rudiukov	7–5, 6–7^{(2–7)}, [10-12]
Loss	0-2	Mar 2022	M15 Frascati, Italy	World Tennis Tour	Clay	(France) Emilien Voisin	(Italy) Alessandro Cortegiani (Italy) Tommaso Compagnucci	3–6, 4–6
Loss	0-3	May 2026	M15 Monastir, Tunisia	World Tennis Tour	Hard	(France) César Bouchelaghem	(Netherlands) Daniel de Jonge (United Kingdom) Finn Murgett	3–6, 2–6
