= Ilia Simakin =

Russian tennis player (born 2003)

- Country (sports): Russia
- Born: 27 October 2003 (age 22) Kazan, Russia
- Height: 1.93 m (6 ft 4 in)
- Plays: Right-handed (two-handed backhand)
- Prize money: US $260,164

Singles
- Career record: 0–1
- Career titles: 4 Challenger
- Highest ranking: No. 143 (19 October 2026)
- Current ranking: No. 143 (19 October 2026)

Grand Slam singles results
- French Open: Q1 (2026)

Doubles
- Career record: 0–0
- Career titles: 1 Challenger
- Highest ranking: No. 230 (19 May 2025)
- Current ranking: No. 387 (19 October 2026)
Medal record
Representing Individual Neutral Athletes
World University Games
Gold medal – first place	2025 Rhine-Ruhr	Doubles
- Last updated on: 19 October 2026.

Ilia Viktorovich Simakin (born 27 October 2003) is a Russian professional tennis player. He has a career-high ATP singles ranking of No. 143 achieved on 19 October 2026 and a best doubles ranking of No. 230 achieved on 19 May 2025.

== Career ==
In the summer of 2026, Simakin won 19 of his past 20 matches, including Challenger title runs in Zhangjiagang and back to back titles in Phan Thiet, Vietnam. As a result he reached a career-high No. 151 in the ATP rankings on 21 September 2026.

Simakin made his ATP debut at the 2026 Rolex Shanghai Masters as a qualifier where he was defeated by Camilo Ugo Carabelli.

== ATP Challenger Tour Finals ==
=== Singles: 8 (4 titles, 4 runner-ups) ===
Legend ATP Challenger Tour (4–4)	Finals by surface Hard (4–4)

Result	W–L	Date	Tournament	Tier	Surface	Opponent	Score
Loss	0–1	May 2025	Moldova Open, Moldova	Challenger	Hard	(France) Clément Chidekh	6–7^{(6–8)}, 5–7
Loss	0–2	Nov 2025	Manama Challenger, Bahrain	Challenger	Hard	(United Kingdom) Toby Samuel	0–6, 2–6
Loss	0–3	Jan 2026	Phan Thiết Challenger, Vietnam	Challenger	Hard	(South Korea) Kwon Soon-woo	2–6, 6–7^{(5–7)}
Win	1–3	Jan 2026	Phan Thiết Challenger II, Vietnam	Challenger	Hard	(China) Zhou Yi	7–5, 6–4
Loss	1–4	Aug 2026	ENKA Open, Turkey	Challenger	Hard	(France) Lucas Poullain	7–5, 2–6, 3–6
Win	2–4	Aug 2026	International Challenger Zhangjiagang, China	Challenger	Hard	(Thailand) Kasidit Samrej	6–3, 6–1
Win	3–4	Sep 2026	Phan Thiết Challenger III, Vietnam	Challenger	Hard	(France) Arthur Weber	6–4, 7–6^{(7–5)}
Win	4–4	Sep 2026	Phan Thiết Challenger IV, Vietnam	Challenger	Hard	(Mexico) Rodrigo Pacheco Méndez	6–7^{(4–7)}, 6–4, 6–3

=== Doubles: 5 (1 title, 4 runner-ups) ===
Legend ATP Challenger Tour (1–4)	Finals by surface Hard (1–4)

Result	W–L	Date	Tournament	Tier	Surface	Partner	Opponents	Score
Win	1–0	Jul 2024	President's Cup, Kazakhstan	Challenger	Hard	Egor Agafonov	(Uzbekistan) Denis Istomin; Evgeny Karlovskiy	6–4, 6–3
Loss	1–1	Mar 2025	Crete Challenger II, Greece	Challenger	Hard	(Canada) Kelsey Stevenson	(Greece) Stefanos Sakellaridis (Greece) Petros Tsitsipas	2–6, 2–6
Loss	1–2	May 2025	Moldova Open, Moldova	Challenger	Hard	(Slovakia) Lukáš Pokorný	(Poland) Szymon Kielan (Poland) Filip Pieczonka	4–6, 0–6
Loss	1–3	Nov 2025	Manama Challenger, Bahrain	Challenger	Hard	Egor Agafonov	Petr Bar Biryukov (Italy) Alexandr Binda	5–7, 1–6
Loss	1–4	Aug 2026	ENKA Open, Turkey	Challenger	Hard	Sergey Betov	(Turkey) Arda Azkara (United Kingdom) James MacKinlay	3–6, 1–6

== ITF World Tennis Tour finals ==
=== Singles: 10 (6 titles, 4 runner-ups) ===
Legend ITF WTT (6–4)	Finals by surface Hard (6–4) Clay (–)

Result	W–L	Date	Tournament	Tier	Surface	Opponent	Score
Win	1–0	Oct 2022	M15 Sharm El-Sheikh, Egypt	WTT	Hard	(Slovakia) Lukáš Pokorný	7–6^{(7–2)}, 2–6, 6–3
Loss	1–1	Apr 2023	M15 Sharm El-Sheikh, Egypt	WTT	Hard	(Egypt) Mohamed Safwat	4–6, 0–6
Loss	1–2	Sep 2023	M25 Monastir, Tunisia	WTT	Hard	(United States) Ryan Seggerman	5–7, 4–6
Win	2–2	Mar 2024	M15 Aktobe, Kazakhstan	WTT	Hard	Egor Agafonov	6–1, 6–1
Win	3–2	May 2024	M15 Tbilisi, Georgia	WTT	Hard	Erik Arutiunian	6–3, 6–3
Win	4–2	Jul 2024	M15 Monastir, Tunisia	WTT	Clay	(Croatia) Mili Poljičak	6–7^{(4–7)}, 6–1, 6–3
Win	5–2	Aug 2024	M15 Nakhon Si Thammarat, Thailand	WTT	Hard	(Thailand) Kasidit Samrej	6–3, 6–4
Win	6–2	Oct 2024	M15 Sharm El Sheikh, Egypt	WTT	Hard	(Czech Republic) Marek Gengel	7–5, 6–3
Loss	6–3	Dec 2024	M15 Sharm El Sheikh, Egypt	WTT	Hard	(Czech Republic) Marek Gengel	4–6, 0–6
Loss	6–4	Dec 2024	M15 Sharm El Sheikh, Egypt	WTT	Hard	(Czech Republic) Marek Gengel	1–6, 1–6
