= Zheng Baoluo =

Chinese tennis player (born 2001)

- Country (sports): China
- Born: 28 April 2001 (age 25) Tangshan, China
- Height: 1.85 m (6 ft 1 in)
- Plays: Right-handed (two-handed backhand)
- Prize money: US $26,638

Singles
- Career record: 0–0 (at ATP Tour level, Grand Slam level, and in Davis Cup)
- Career titles: 0
- Highest ranking: No. 1,706 (12 June 2023)

Doubles
- Career record: 0–0 (at ATP Tour level, Grand Slam level, and in Davis Cup)
- Career titles: 1 Challenger, 6 ITF
- Highest ranking: No. 202 (9 November 2026)
- Current ranking: No. 202 (9 November 2026)
- Last updated on: 9 November 2026.

Zheng Baoluo (born 28 April 2001) is a Chinese tennis player. He has a career high ATP singles ranking of No. 1,706 achieved on 12 June 2023 and a career high ATP doubles ranking of No. 202 achieved on 9 November 2026.

Zheng has won one ATP Challenger doubles title at the 2026 Samsun Open.
