= 2025 Manama Challenger – Singles =

Singles
- 2025 Manama Challenger

Final
- Champion: (United Kingdom) Toby Samuel
- Runner-up: Ilia Simakin
- Score: 6–0, 6–2

Events
Singles	Doubles
- Manama Challenger

This was the first edition of the tournament.

Toby Samuel won the title after defeating Ilia Simakin 6–0, 6–2 in the final.

== Seeds ==
1. (Belgium) Kimmer Coppejans (withdrew)
2. Ilia Simakin (final)
3. Petr Bar Biryukov (first round, retired)
4. (France) Mathys Erhard (second round)
5. (Croatia) Duje Ajduković (withdrew)
6. (Czech Republic) Petr Brunclík (semifinals)
7. (Netherlands) Jelle Sels (withdrew)
8. (Uzbekistan) Sergey Fomin (quarterfinals)
9. (Italy) Alexandr Binda (first round)

== Draw ==
Key

- Q = Qualifier
- WC = Wild card
- LL = Lucky loser
- Alt = Alternate
- ITF = ITF entry
- PR = Protected ranking
- SR = Special ranking
- SE = Special exempt
- JE = Junior exempt
- JR = Junior Accelerator Programme entrant
- CO = College Accelerator Programme entrant
- NG = Next Gen Accelerator Program entrant
- w/o = Walkover
- r = Retired
- d = Defaulted

=== Finals ===
Semifinals
(United Kingdom) Toby Samuel	6	6
Q	(France) Matisse Bobichon	3	2
6	(Czech Republic) Petr Brunclík	6	6^{4}	3
2	Ilia Simakin	1	7^{7}	6

Final
(United Kingdom) Toby Samuel	6	6
2	Ilia Simakin	0	2

=== Top half ===
First round
LL	(Northern Mariana Islands) C Sinclair	3	0
(United Kingdom) T Samuel	6	6
Q	Semen Pankin	6	7^{7}
(Poland) Olaf Pieczkowski	4	6^{5}
Q	(Germany) Maximilian Homberg	6	7
Q	(Tunisia) A Ouakaa	2	5
(United States) Dali Blanch	7^{7}	6^{1}	3
8	(Uzbekistan) S Fomin	6^{2}	7^{7}	6
3	P Bar Biryukov	6	2	1^{r}
(Egypt) Fares Zakaria	4	6	3
Q	(France) M Bobichon	6	6
Alt	(Ukraine) Yurii Dzhavakian	1	4
(Switzerland) A Ritschard	6	6
(Moldova) R Albot	3	2
JR	(Poland) T Berkieta	6^{5}	4
LL	(Czech Republic) D Kellovský	7^{7}	6

Second round
(United Kingdom) T Samuel	6	6
Q	S Pankin	2	1
Q	(Germany) M Homberg	0	6^{4}
8	(Uzbekistan) S Fomin	6	7^{7}
(Egypt) F Zakaria	3	2
Q	(France) M Bobichon	6	6
(Switzerland) A Ritschard	3	6	7^{7}
LL	(Czech Republic) D Kellovský	6	1	6^{5}

Quarterfinals
(United Kingdom) T Samuel	6	6
8	(Uzbekistan) S Fomin	4	2
Q	(France) M Bobichon	2	6	6
(Switzerland) A Ritschard	6	4	2

Semifinals
(United Kingdom) T Samuel	6	6
Q	(France) M Bobichon	3	2

=== Bottom half ===
First round
6	(Czech Republic) Petr Brunclík	6^{7}	6	6
LL	(United Kingdom) M Summers	7^{9}	3	3
PR	(Syria) H Naw	4	4
(Greece) Ioannis Xilas	6	6
E Agafonov	4	1
(Bosnia and Herzegovina) M Bašić	6	6
Alt	(Germany) Nino Ehrenschneider	4	4
4	(France) Mathys Erhard	6	6
9	(Italy) A Binda	4	6	5
WC	(Romania) Vladislav Melnic	6	2	7
WC	(Republic of Ireland) Cian Maguire	0	2
Q	(Spain) Iván Marrero Curbelo	6	6
Q	(Finland) P Niklas-Salminen	2	6^{3}
(Finland) E Vasa	6	7^{7}
(Georgia (country)) A Bakshi	1	2
2	I Simakin	6	6

Second round
6	(Czech Republic) P Brunclík	6	6
(Greece) I Xilas	2	1
(Bosnia and Herzegovina) M Bašić	6	6
4	(France) M Erhard	4	3
WC	(Romania) V Melnic	6	6^{6}	1
Q	(Spain) I Marrero Curbelo	3	7^{8}	6
(Finland) E Vasa	4	1
2	I Simakin	6	6

Quarterfinals
6	(Czech Republic) P Brunclík	6	6
(Bosnia and Herzegovina) M Bašić	1	3
Q	(Spain) I Marrero Curbelo	3	6	1
2	I Simakin	6	3	6

Semifinals
6	(Czech Republic) P Brunclík	6	6^{4}	3
2	I Simakin	1	7^{7}	6
