= 2024 ITF Men's World Tennis Tour (January–March) =

Second-tier men's professional tennis tour

The 2024 ITF Men's World Tennis Tour is the 2024 edition of the second-tier tour for men's professional tennis. It is organised by the International Tennis Federation and is a tier below the ATP Challenger Tour. The ITF Men's World Tennis Tour includes tournaments with prize money ranging from $15,000 to $25,000.

Since 2022, following the Russian invasion of Ukraine the ITF announced that players from Belarus and Russia could still play on the tour but would not be allowed to play under the flag of Belarus or Russia.

== Key ==
M25 tournaments
M15 tournaments

== Month ==
=== January ===
Week of	Tournament	Winner	Runners-up	Semifinalists	Quarterfinalists
January 1	Esch-sur-Alzette, Luxembourg; Hard (i); M25; Singles and Doubles Draws	(United Kingdom) Jacob Fearnley; 6–4, 6–4	(Czech Republic) Jonáš Forejtek	(Turkey) Yankı Erel (France) Clément Chidekh	(United Kingdom) Ryan James Storrie (Belgium) Kylian Collignon (Belgium) Raphaël Collignon (Latvia) Robert Strombachs
January 1	Esch-sur-Alzette, Luxembourg; Hard (i); M25; Singles and Doubles Draws	(United Kingdom) Jacob Fearnley (United States) Alex Rybakov; 6–3, 6–3	(Luxembourg) Raphael Calzi (France) Amaury Raynel	(Turkey) Yankı Erel (France) Clément Chidekh	(United Kingdom) Ryan James Storrie (Belgium) Kylian Collignon (Belgium) Raphaël Collignon (Latvia) Robert Strombachs
January 1	Kish Island, Iran; Clay; M15; Singles and Doubles Draws	(Ukraine) Oleg Prihodko; 6–3, 6–7^{(7–9)}, 6–0	(Italy) Lorenzo Bocchi	(Hungary) Mátyás Füle; Denis Klok	(Syria) Hazem Naw (Iran) Hamidreza Nadaf (Hungary) Gergely Madarász (Italy) Giovanni Calvano
January 1	Kish Island, Iran; Clay; M15; Singles and Doubles Draws	(Hungary) Mátyás Füle (Hungary) Gergely Madarász; 6–4, 7–5	(Iran) Samyar Elyasi (Iran) Hamidreza Nadaf	(Hungary) Mátyás Füle; Denis Klok	(Syria) Hazem Naw (Iran) Hamidreza Nadaf (Hungary) Gergely Madarász (Italy) Giovanni Calvano
January 1	Monastir, Tunisia; Hard; M15; Singles and Doubles Draws	(Poland) Kamil Majchrzak; 6–1, 6–1	(Japan) Ryuki Matsuda	(China) Mu Tao (France) Maxence Bertimon	(France) Constantin Bittoun Kouzmine; Ilia Simakin (Japan) Ryotaro Taguchi (France) Florent Bax
January 1	Monastir, Tunisia; Hard; M15; Singles and Doubles Draws	Petr Bar Biryukov; Ilia Simakin; 7–6^{(7–5)}, 7–6^{(7–3)}	(France) Florent Bax (France) Maxence Beaugé	(China) Mu Tao (France) Maxence Bertimon	(France) Constantin Bittoun Kouzmine; Ilia Simakin (Japan) Ryotaro Taguchi (France) Florent Bax
January 8	Mandya, India; Hard; M25; Singles and Doubles Draws	(Israel) Orel Kimhi; 6–2, 6–4	(Netherlands) Jelle Sels	(India) Karan Singh (India) Siddharth Vishwakarma	(South Africa) Kris van Wyk (Netherlands) Thijmen Loof (India) Madhwin Kamath (Vietnam) Lý Hoàng Nam
January 8	Mandya, India; Hard; M25; Singles and Doubles Draws	(India) Parikshit Somani (India) Manish Sureshkumar; 4–6, 6–1, [10–8]	(South Korea) Shin Woo-bin (India) Karan Singh	(India) Karan Singh (India) Siddharth Vishwakarma	(South Africa) Kris van Wyk (Netherlands) Thijmen Loof (India) Madhwin Kamath (Vietnam) Lý Hoàng Nam
January 8	Loughborough, United Kingdom; Hard (i); M25; Singles and Doubles Draws	(United Kingdom) Kyle Edmund; 6–4, 6–4	(Poland) Martyn Pawelski	(United Kingdom) Charles Broom (United States) Cannon Kingsley	(Norway) Viktor Durasovic (Italy) Fausto Tabacco (United Kingdom) Anton Matusevich (United Kingdom) Henry Searle
January 8	Loughborough, United Kingdom; Hard (i); M25; Singles and Doubles Draws	(United Kingdom) Charles Broom (United Kingdom) George Houghton; 7–5, 6–3	(United Kingdom) Jay Clarke (United Kingdom) Millen Hurrion	(United Kingdom) Charles Broom (United States) Cannon Kingsley	(Norway) Viktor Durasovic (Italy) Fausto Tabacco (United Kingdom) Anton Matusevich (United Kingdom) Henry Searle
January 8	Kish Island, Iran; Clay; M15; Singles and Doubles Draws	(Syria) Hazem Naw; 6–0, 6–4	(Ukraine) Oleg Prihodko	(Hungary) Gergely Madarász; Denis Klok	(Italy) Alessandro Cortegiani (Italy) Lorenzo Bocchi (Italy) Gianluca Cadenasso (Iran) Sina Moghimi
January 8	Kish Island, Iran; Clay; M15; Singles and Doubles Draws	(Iran) Samyar Elyasi (Iran) Ali Yazdani; 7–6^{(8–6)}, 6–4	(Italy) Simone Agostini (Italy) Gianluca Cadenasso	(Hungary) Gergely Madarász; Denis Klok	(Italy) Alessandro Cortegiani (Italy) Lorenzo Bocchi (Italy) Gianluca Cadenasso (Iran) Sina Moghimi
January 8	Doha, Qatar; Hard; M15; Singles and Doubles Draws	(Uzbekistan) Khumoyun Sultanov; 7–6^{(7–3)}, 6–4	(Turkey) Yankı Erel	(Georgia (country)) Saba Purtseladze (Ukraine) Viacheslav Bielinskyi	(Poland) Olaf Pieczkowski (France) Antoine Ghibaudo; Alexey Zakharov (United Kingdom) Ali Habib
January 8	Doha, Qatar; Hard; M15; Singles and Doubles Draws	(Japan) Masamichi Imamura (Japan) Naoki Tajima; 6–2, 6–3	(Morocco) Elliot Benchetrit (France) Antoine Ghibaudo	(Georgia (country)) Saba Purtseladze (Ukraine) Viacheslav Bielinskyi	(Poland) Olaf Pieczkowski (France) Antoine Ghibaudo; Alexey Zakharov (United Kingdom) Ali Habib
January 8	Manacor, Spain; Hard; M15; Singles and Doubles Draws	(Switzerland) Jérôme Kym; 6–4, 6–2	(Spain) Pol Martín Tiffon	(Spain) Imanol López Morillo (Netherlands) Ryan Nijboer	(United States) Alex Rybakov (Slovakia) Miloš Karol (Netherlands) Deney Wassermann (France) Nathan Trouvé
January 8	Manacor, Spain; Hard; M15; Singles and Doubles Draws	(Netherlands) Michiel de Krom (Netherlands) Ryan Nijboer; 7–5, 6–4	(Germany) Liam Gavrielides (Germany) Max Wiskandt	(Spain) Imanol López Morillo (Netherlands) Ryan Nijboer	(United States) Alex Rybakov (Slovakia) Miloš Karol (Netherlands) Deney Wassermann (France) Nathan Trouvé
January 8	Monastir, Tunisia; Hard; M15; Singles and Doubles Draws	(Czech Republic) Jakub Nicod; 6–4, 6–4	(Japan) Ryuki Matsuda	(Belgium) Émilien Demanet (Germany) Nicola Kuhn	(Netherlands) Stijn Slump (France) Maxence Beaugé (Poland) Kamil Majchrzak (Germany) Christoph Negritu
January 8	Monastir, Tunisia; Hard; M15; Singles and Doubles Draws	(Germany) Christoph Negritu (Tunisia) Aziz Ouakaa; 6–4, 6–7^{(5–7)}, [10–4]	(Germany) Nicola Kuhn (Spain) David Pérez Sanz	(Belgium) Émilien Demanet (Germany) Nicola Kuhn	(Netherlands) Stijn Slump (France) Maxence Beaugé (Poland) Kamil Majchrzak (Germany) Christoph Negritu
January 8	Antalya, Turkey; Clay; M15; Singles and Doubles Draws	(Romania) Filip Cristian Jianu; 7–6^{(7–5)}, 6–4	(Germany) Peter Heller	(Italy) Niccolò Catini (Spain) Carlos Gimeno Valero	(Turkey) Gökberk Sarıtaş (Czech Republic) Dominik Kellovský (Turkey) Cengiz Aksu (Germany) Paul Wörner
January 8	Antalya, Turkey; Clay; M15; Singles and Doubles Draws	(Germany) Peter Heller (Czech Republic) Dominik Kellovský; 6–2, 6–7^{(3–7)}, [10–3]	(Romania) Alexandru Cristian Dumitru (Romania) Călin Manda	(Italy) Niccolò Catini (Spain) Carlos Gimeno Valero	(Turkey) Gökberk Sarıtaş (Czech Republic) Dominik Kellovský (Turkey) Cengiz Aksu (Germany) Paul Wörner
January 15	Bhopal, India; Hard; M25; Singles and Doubles Draws	Bogdan Bobrov; Walkover	(United Kingdom) Oliver Crawford	(Ukraine) Eric Vanshelboim (Austria) David Pichler	(India) Aryan Shah (India) Siddharth Vishwakarma (India) Manish Sureshkumar (Czech Republic) Dominik Palán
January 15	Bhopal, India; Hard; M25; Singles and Doubles Draws	Bogdan Bobrov (Switzerland) Luca Castelnuovo; 6–4, 6–2	(India) Ishaque Eqbal (India) Faisal Qamar	(Ukraine) Eric Vanshelboim (Austria) David Pichler	(India) Aryan Shah (India) Siddharth Vishwakarma (India) Manish Sureshkumar (Czech Republic) Dominik Palán
January 15	Doha, Qatar; Hard; M25; Singles and Doubles Draws	(Turkey) Ergi Kırkın; 3–6, 6–1, 7–5	(Uzbekistan) Khumoyun Sultanov	(Austria) Sandro Kopp (United Kingdom) Ali Habib	(Japan) Naoki Tajima (France) Antoine Ghibaudo (Japan) Masamichi Imamura (Poland) Olaf Pieczkowski
January 15	Doha, Qatar; Hard; M25; Singles and Doubles Draws	(Turkey) Yankı Erel (Turkey) Ergi Kırkın; 4–6, 6–3, [10–2]	(Japan) Masamichi Imamura (Japan) Naoki Tajima	(Austria) Sandro Kopp (United Kingdom) Ali Habib	(Japan) Naoki Tajima (France) Antoine Ghibaudo (Japan) Masamichi Imamura (Poland) Olaf Pieczkowski
January 15	Sunderland, United Kingdom; Hard (i); M25; Singles and Doubles Draws	(United Kingdom) Kyle Edmund; 7–5, 3–6, 6–3	(United Kingdom) Hamish Stewart	(Czech Republic) Jonáš Forejtek (Italy) Marcello Serafini	(France) Dan Added (United Kingdom) Daniel Cox (United Kingdom) Millen Hurrion (United Kingdom) Ben Jones
January 15	Sunderland, United Kingdom; Hard (i); M25; Singles and Doubles Draws	(United Kingdom) David Stevenson (United Kingdom) Marcus Willis; 4–6, 7–6^{(8–6)}, [10–8]	(France) Dan Added (France) Clément Chidekh	(Czech Republic) Jonáš Forejtek (Italy) Marcello Serafini	(France) Dan Added (United Kingdom) Daniel Cox (United Kingdom) Millen Hurrion (United Kingdom) Ben Jones
January 15	Ithaca, United States; Hard (i); M25; Singles and Doubles Draws	(Brazil) Karue Sell; 6–3, 3–0, ret.	(United States) Tristan McCormick	(Romania) Radu Mihai Papoe (United States) Adit Sinha	(United States) Alexander Bernard (United States) Ozan Baris (United States) Noah Schachter (United States) Joshua Sheehy
January 15	Ithaca, United States; Hard (i); M25; Singles and Doubles Draws	(Sweden) Simon Freund (Denmark) Johannes Ingildsen; 6–4, 7–6^{(7–4)}	(United States) Joshua Sheehy (United States) Pranav Kumar	(Romania) Radu Mihai Papoe (United States) Adit Sinha	(United States) Alexander Bernard (United States) Ozan Baris (United States) Noah Schachter (United States) Joshua Sheehy
January 15	Bressuire, France; Hard (i); M15; Singles and Doubles Draws	(France) Maé Malige; 7–6^{(7–3)}, 6–4	(France) Arthur Bouquier	(Ivory Coast) Eliakim Coulibaly (France) Kenny de Schepper	(Italy) Alessandro Pecci (Italy) Andrea Picchione (Poland) Martyn Pawelski (France) Louis Dussin
January 15	Bressuire, France; Hard (i); M15; Singles and Doubles Draws	(Ivory Coast) Eliakim Coulibaly (Finland) Eero Vasa; 4–6, 7–6^{(8–6)}, [10–8]	(Slovakia) Lukáš Pokorný (Slovakia) Igor Zelenay	(Ivory Coast) Eliakim Coulibaly (France) Kenny de Schepper	(Italy) Alessandro Pecci (Italy) Andrea Picchione (Poland) Martyn Pawelski (France) Louis Dussin
January 15	Cadolzburg, Germany; Carpet (i); M15; Singles and Doubles Draws	(Germany) Daniel Masur; 6–3, 3–6, 6–4	(Republic of Ireland) Michael Agwi	(Germany) Max Hans Rehberg (Czech Republic) Jakub Filip	(Netherlands) Niels Visker (Germany) Tom Gentzsch (Germany) Milan Welte; Kirill Kivattsev
January 15	Cadolzburg, Germany; Carpet (i); M15; Singles and Doubles Draws	(Republic of Ireland) Simon Carr; Kirill Kivattsev; 6–4, 6–4	(Finland) Patrick Kaukovalta (Germany) Tim Rühl	(Germany) Max Hans Rehberg (Czech Republic) Jakub Filip	(Netherlands) Niels Visker (Germany) Tom Gentzsch (Germany) Milan Welte; Kirill Kivattsev
January 15	Manacor, Spain; Hard; M15; Singles and Doubles Draws	Yaroslav Demin; 6–3, 5–7, 6–3	(Croatia) Luka Mikrut	(Bulgaria) Nikolay Nedelchev (France) Enzo Wallart	(Netherlands) Michiel de Krom (Netherlands) Deney Wassermann (India) Manas Dhamne (Italy) Luca Giacomini
January 15	Manacor, Spain; Hard; M15; Singles and Doubles Draws	(Netherlands) Michiel de Krom (Netherlands) Ryan Nijboer; 6–4, 4–6, [11–9]	(Colombia) Adrià Soriano Barrera (Switzerland) Jérôme Kym	(Bulgaria) Nikolay Nedelchev (France) Enzo Wallart	(Netherlands) Michiel de Krom (Netherlands) Deney Wassermann (India) Manas Dhamne (Italy) Luca Giacomini
January 15	Monastir, Tunisia; Hard; M15; Singles and Doubles Draws	Nikolay Vylegzhanin; 6–2, 6–2	(Spain) David Pérez Sanz	(Germany) Luca Wiedenmann (Belgium) Émilien Demanet	(Serbia) Miljan Zekić (France) Louis Tessa (Czech Republic) Jakub Nicod (Germany) Nicola Kuhn
January 15	Monastir, Tunisia; Hard; M15; Singles and Doubles Draws	(France) Constantin Bittoun Kouzmine (Croatia) Mili Poljičak; 6–1, 0–6, [10–8]	(Germany) Nicola Kuhn (Spain) David Pérez Sanz	(Germany) Luca Wiedenmann (Belgium) Émilien Demanet	(Serbia) Miljan Zekić (France) Louis Tessa (Czech Republic) Jakub Nicod (Germany) Nicola Kuhn
January 15	Antalya, Turkey; Clay; M15; Singles and Doubles Draws	(Spain) Carlos Gimeno Valero; 6–3, 6–4	(Romania) Filip Cristian Jianu	(Italy) Niccolò Catini (Romania) Cezar Crețu	(Austria) Matthias Ujvary (Czech Republic) Dominik Kellovský (Italy) Federico Arnaboldi (France) Quentin Folliot
January 15	Antalya, Turkey; Clay; M15; Singles and Doubles Draws	(Turkey) Mert Alkaya (Turkey) Berk İlkel; 6–4, 6–4	(Romania) Cezar Crețu (Romania) Bogdan Pavel	(Italy) Niccolò Catini (Romania) Cezar Crețu	(Austria) Matthias Ujvary (Czech Republic) Dominik Kellovský (Italy) Federico Arnaboldi (France) Quentin Folliot
January 22	Nußloch, Germany; Carpet (i); M25; Singles and Doubles Draws	(Germany) Daniel Masur; 6–1, 6–3	(Germany) Tom Gentzsch	(United Kingdom) Alastair Gray (Syria) Hazem Naw	(Latvia) Robert Strombachs (Germany) Leopold Zima (United Kingdom) Millen️️ Hurrion (Germany) Max Hans Rehberg
January 22	Nußloch, Germany; Carpet (i); M25; Singles and Doubles Draws	(Germany) Daniel Masur (Germany) Kai Wehnelt; 6–1, 3–6, [10–8]	(Czech Republic) Patrik Rikl (Czech Republic) Matěj Vocel	(United Kingdom) Alastair Gray (Syria) Hazem Naw	(Latvia) Robert Strombachs (Germany) Leopold Zima (United Kingdom) Millen️️ Hurrion (Germany) Max Hans Rehberg
January 22	Chennai, India; Hard; M25; Singles and Doubles Draws	(Australia) Bernard Tomic; 6–4, 7–6^{(7–3)}	(India) Mukund Sasikumar	(Ukraine) Eric Vanshelboim (Netherlands) Jelle Sels	(Austria) Sandro Kopp (Indonesia) Muhammad Rifqi Fitriadi (France) Arthur Weber; Alexey Zakharov
January 22	Chennai, India; Hard; M25; Singles and Doubles Draws	(Philippines) Francis Alcantara (Indonesia) Christopher Rungkat; 6–4, 6–2	Bogdan Bobrov (India) Adil Kalyanpur	(Ukraine) Eric Vanshelboim (Netherlands) Jelle Sels	(Austria) Sandro Kopp (Indonesia) Muhammad Rifqi Fitriadi (France) Arthur Weber; Alexey Zakharov
January 22	Wesley Chapel, United States; Hard; M25; Singles and Doubles Draws	(Dominican Republic) Roberto Cid Subervi; 6–3, 6–2	(United States) Nick Chappell	(United States) Toby Kodat (United States) Axel Nefve	(United States) Harrison Adams (Ecuador) Andrés Andrade (Belgium) Gilles-Arnaud Bailly (United States) Noah Rubin
January 22	Wesley Chapel, United States; Hard; M25; Singles and Doubles Draws	(Sweden) Simon Freund (Denmark) Johannes Ingildsen; 6–4, 6–7^{(6–8)}, [10–4]	(Colombia) Nicolas Buitrago (United States) Victor Lilov	(United States) Toby Kodat (United States) Axel Nefve	(United States) Harrison Adams (Ecuador) Andrés Andrade (Belgium) Gilles-Arnaud Bailly (United States) Noah Rubin
January 22	Bagnoles-de-l'Orne, France; Clay (i); M15; Singles and Doubles Draws	Alexey Vatutin; 7–5, 2–6, 6–3	(Italy) Andrea Picchione	(France) Corentin Denolly (France) Quentin Folliot	(Hungary) Gergely Madarász (France) Nathan Seateun (Ukraine) Vladyslav Orlov (Italy) Alessandro Pecci
January 22	Bagnoles-de-l'Orne, France; Clay (i); M15; Singles and Doubles Draws	(Italy) Filippo Romano (Italy) Leonardo Taddia; 7–6^{(7–4)}, 6–3	(United Kingdom) James Markiewicz (United Kingdom) Michael Shaw	(France) Corentin Denolly (France) Quentin Folliot	(Hungary) Gergely Madarász (France) Nathan Seateun (Ukraine) Vladyslav Orlov (Italy) Alessandro Pecci
January 22	Manacor, Spain; Hard; M15; Singles and Doubles Draws	(Ukraine) Georgii Kravchenko; 7–5, 6–3	(Netherlands) Ryan Nijboer	(Sweden) Karl Friberg (Croatia) Matej Dodig	(Netherlands) Michiel de Krom (Spain) Martín Landaluce; Yaroslav Demin (Netherlands) Sidané Pontjodikromo
January 22	Manacor, Spain; Hard; M15; Singles and Doubles Draws	(Lithuania) Edas Butvilas (Spain) Carlos López Montagud; 6–2, 7–6^{(8–6)}	Yaroslav Demin (Hong Kong) Coleman Wong	(Sweden) Karl Friberg (Croatia) Matej Dodig	(Netherlands) Michiel de Krom (Spain) Martín Landaluce; Yaroslav Demin (Netherlands) Sidané Pontjodikromo
January 22	Monastir, Tunisia; Hard; M15; Singles and Doubles Draws	(Switzerland) Jakub Paul; 7–5, 6–3	Evgenii Tiurnev	(Germany) Nicola Kuhn (France) Adrien Gobat	(Spain) Andrés Fernández Cánovas (Bulgaria) Alexander Donski (Croatia) Mili Poljičak (Germany) Luca Wiedenmann
January 22	Monastir, Tunisia; Hard; M15; Singles and Doubles Draws	(Germany) Christoph Negritu (United States) Michael Zhu; 6–3, 2–6, [10–6]	(United Kingdom) Stuart Parker (Switzerland) Jakub Paul	(Germany) Nicola Kuhn (France) Adrien Gobat	(Spain) Andrés Fernández Cánovas (Bulgaria) Alexander Donski (Croatia) Mili Poljičak (Germany) Luca Wiedenmann
January 22	Antalya, Turkey; Clay; M15; Singles and Doubles Draws	(Romania) Nicholas David Ionel; 6–1, 6–1	(Romania) Cezar Crețu	(Italy) Daniele Minighini (Turkey) Ergi Kırkın	(Spain) Jorge Martínez Martínez (Moldova) Ilya Snițari (Spain) Carlos Gimeno Valero (Romania) Vlad Andrei Dancu
January 22	Antalya, Turkey; Clay; M15; Singles and Doubles Draws	(Romania) Cezar Crețu (Romania) Bogdan Pavel; 6–3, 6–2	(Czech Republic) Dominik Kellovský (Spain) Jorge Martínez Martínez	(Italy) Daniele Minighini (Turkey) Ergi Kırkın	(Spain) Jorge Martínez Martínez (Moldova) Ilya Snițari (Spain) Carlos Gimeno Valero (Romania) Vlad Andrei Dancu
January 29	Hammamet, Tunisia; Clay; M25; Singles and Doubles Draws	(Italy) Gian Marco Moroni; 6–3, 6–0	(France) Corentin Denolly	(Germany) Adrian Oetzbach; Denis Klok	(Italy) Noah Perfetti (Brazil) Oscar José Gutierrez (Ukraine) Oleksandr Ovcharenko (Switzerland) Johan Nikles
January 29	Hammamet, Tunisia; Clay; M25; Singles and Doubles Draws	(France) Corentin Denolly (Romania) Filip Cristian Jianu; 6–3, 4–6, [10–7]	(Germany) Adrian Oetzbach (Canada) Kelsey Stevenson	(Germany) Adrian Oetzbach; Denis Klok	(Italy) Noah Perfetti (Brazil) Oscar José Gutierrez (Ukraine) Oleksandr Ovcharenko (Switzerland) Johan Nikles
January 29	Antalya, Turkey; Clay; M25; Singles and Doubles Draws	(Spain) Javier Barranco Cosano; 6–2, 6–3	(Argentina) Bautista Vilicich	(France) Mathys Erhard (Spain) Daniel Mérida	(Serbia) Stefan Popović (France) Arthur Géa (Spain) Jorge Martínez Martínez (Ukraine) Nikita Mashtakov
January 29	Antalya, Turkey; Clay; M25; Singles and Doubles Draws	(Czech Republic) Dominik Kellovský (Romania) Bogdan Pavel; 6–3, 3–6, [10–8]	(India) Siddhant Banthia (India) Sai Karteek Reddy Ganta	(France) Mathys Erhard (Spain) Daniel Mérida	(Serbia) Stefan Popović (France) Arthur Géa (Spain) Jorge Martínez Martínez (Ukraine) Nikita Mashtakov
January 29	Sharm El Sheikh, Egypt; Hard; M15; Singles and Doubles Draws	(Czech Republic) Marek Gengel; 6–7^{(5–7)}, 6–3, 6–2	Aliaksandr Liaonenka	Marat Sharipov (Poland) Martyn Pawelski	(Netherlands) Niels Visker (Italy) Luca Giacomini; Sergei Pogosian (Poland) Jasza Szajrych
January 29	Sharm El Sheikh, Egypt; Hard; M15; Singles and Doubles Draws	Erik Arutiunian; Pavel Verbin; 3–6, 7–5, [10–5]	(Italy) Federico Bondioli (Italy) Carlo Alberto Caniato	Marat Sharipov (Poland) Martyn Pawelski	(Netherlands) Niels Visker (Italy) Luca Giacomini; Sergei Pogosian (Poland) Jasza Szajrych
January 29	Veigy-Foncenex, France; Carpet (i); M15; Singles and Doubles Draws	(France) Arthur Bouquier; 6–7^{(5–7)}, 6–4, 6–4	(France) Antoine Hoang	(Italy) Marcello Serafini (Italy) Filippo Romano	(Italy) Alessandro Pecci (Austria) Neil Oberleitner (France) Yanis Ghazouani Durand (France) Fabien Salle
January 29	Veigy-Foncenex, France; Carpet (i); M15; Singles and Doubles Draws	(United Kingdom) James Davis (United Kingdom) David Stevenson; 6–3, 7–6^{(7–5)}	(France) Adan Freire da Silva (France) Yanis Ghazouani Durand	(Italy) Marcello Serafini (Italy) Filippo Romano	(Italy) Alessandro Pecci (Austria) Neil Oberleitner (France) Yanis Ghazouani Durand (France) Fabien Salle
January 29	Monastir, Tunisia; Hard; M15; Singles and Doubles Draws	Evgenii Tiurnev; 6–1, 2–0 ret.	Egor Agafonov	(United Kingdom) Stuart Parker (United States) Michael Zhu	(Italy) Fausto Tabacco (Czech Republic) Denis Peták (Italy) Giorgio Tabacco (Italy) Federico Iannaccone
January 29	Monastir, Tunisia; Hard; M15; Singles and Doubles Draws	Aleksandr Lobanov; Evgenii Tiurnev; 6–7^{(5–7)}, 6–4, [10–8]	(Germany) Christoph Negritu (Switzerland) Jakub Paul	(United Kingdom) Stuart Parker (United States) Michael Zhu	(Italy) Fausto Tabacco (Czech Republic) Denis Peták (Italy) Giorgio Tabacco (Italy) Federico Iannaccone

=== February ===
Week of	Tournament	Winner	Runners-up	Semifinalists	Quarterfinalists
February 5	Hammamet, Tunisia; Clay; M25; Singles and Doubles Draws	(Poland) Kamil Majchrzak; 6–3, 7–5	(United Kingdom) Jay Clarke	(Romania) Nicholas David Ionel (Romania) Filip Cristian Jianu	(Brazil) Oscar José Gutierrez (Italy) Gian Marco Moroni (Italy) Daniel Bagnolini (France) Corentin Denolly
February 5	Hammamet, Tunisia; Clay; M25; Singles and Doubles Draws	(Italy) Simone Agostini (Italy) Gianluca Cadenasso; 6–2, 1–6, [10–7]	(Italy) Omar Brigida (Ukraine) Oleksandr Ovcharenko	(Romania) Nicholas David Ionel (Romania) Filip Cristian Jianu	(Brazil) Oscar José Gutierrez (Italy) Gian Marco Moroni (Italy) Daniel Bagnolini (France) Corentin Denolly
February 5	Antalya, Turkey; Clay; M25; Singles and Doubles Draws	(Dominican Republic) Nick Hardt; 6–1, 6–4	(France) Clément Tabur	(France) Mathys Erhard (Spain) Daniel Mérida	(Romania) Sebastian Gima (Austria) Gerald Melzer (Spain) Javier Barranco Cosano (Lebanon) Hady Habib
February 5	Antalya, Turkey; Clay; M25; Singles and Doubles Draws	(Argentina) Alejo Lorenzo Lingua Lavallén (Argentina) Juan Pablo Paz; 7–5, 6–4	(Dominican Republic) Nick Hardt (Brazil) Gabriel Roveri Sidney	(France) Mathys Erhard (Spain) Daniel Mérida	(Romania) Sebastian Gima (Austria) Gerald Melzer (Spain) Javier Barranco Cosano (Lebanon) Hady Habib
February 5	Punta del Este, Uruguay; Clay; M25; Singles and Doubles Draws	(Bolivia) Murkel Dellien; 6–4, 3–6, 7–5	(Peru) Gonzalo Bueno	(Paraguay) Daniel Vallejo (Argentina) Gonzalo Villanueva	(Argentina) Juan Bautista Torres (Ecuador) Álvaro Guillén Meza (Argentina) Guido Iván Justo (Uruguay) Federico Aguilar Cardozo
February 5	Punta del Este, Uruguay; Clay; M25; Singles and Doubles Draws	(Brazil) Daniel Dutra da Silva (Brazil) Eduardo Ribeiro; 7–5, 3–6, [11–9]	(Argentina) Juan Bautista Otegui (Switzerland) Nicolás Parizzia	(Paraguay) Daniel Vallejo (Argentina) Gonzalo Villanueva	(Argentina) Juan Bautista Torres (Ecuador) Álvaro Guillén Meza (Argentina) Guido Iván Justo (Uruguay) Federico Aguilar Cardozo
February 5	Sharm El Sheikh, Egypt; Hard; M15; Singles and Doubles Draws	(Czech Republic) Marek Gengel; 6–3, 6–3	(Estonia) Oliver Ojakäär	(Italy) Federico Bondioli (Egypt) Mohamed Safwat	(United Kingdom) Emile Hudd (Netherlands) Niels Visker (Georgia (country)) Saba Purtseladze (Germany) Kevin Hümpfner
February 5	Sharm El Sheikh, Egypt; Hard; M15; Singles and Doubles Draws	(United Kingdom) Emile Hudd (United Kingdom) David Stevenson; 6–2, 6–4	(Czech Republic) Marek Gengel (United Kingdom) Mark Whitehouse	(Italy) Federico Bondioli (Egypt) Mohamed Safwat	(United Kingdom) Emile Hudd (Netherlands) Niels Visker (Georgia (country)) Saba Purtseladze (Germany) Kevin Hümpfner
February 5	Grenoble, France; Hard (i); M15; Singles and Doubles Draws	(France) Clément Chidekh; 6–3, 2–6, 6–3	(France) Antoine Hoang	(Germany) Daniel Masur (Austria) Neil Oberleitner	(France) Arthur Bouquier (Ukraine) Georgii Kravchenko (France) Sascha Gueymard Wayenburg (France) Evan Furness
February 5	Grenoble, France; Hard (i); M15; Singles and Doubles Draws	(France) Clément Chidekh (Israel) Roy Stepanov; 6–0, 6–4	(Germany) Daniel Masur (Switzerland) Yannik Steinegger	(Germany) Daniel Masur (Austria) Neil Oberleitner	(France) Arthur Bouquier (Ukraine) Georgii Kravchenko (France) Sascha Gueymard Wayenburg (France) Evan Furness
February 5	Monastir, Tunisia; Hard; M15; Singles and Doubles Draws	(France) Robin Bertrand; 6–1, 6–3	(Italy) Federico Iannaccone	Ilia Simakin; Evgenii Tiurnev	(Spain) Alberto Barroso Campos (Italy) Lorenzo Carboni (Jordan) Mousa Alkotop (United States) Dali Blanch
February 5	Monastir, Tunisia; Hard; M15; Singles and Doubles Draws	(Switzerland) Adrien Berrut (Switzerland) Jakub Paul; 6–1, 6–2	(France) Robin Bertrand (France) Benjamin Pietri	Ilia Simakin; Evgenii Tiurnev	(Spain) Alberto Barroso Campos (Italy) Lorenzo Carboni (Jordan) Mousa Alkotop (United States) Dali Blanch
February 5	Sunrise, United States; Clay; M15; Singles and Doubles Draws	(Kazakhstan) Dmitry Popko; 7–5, 6–2	(United States) Alex Rybakov	(Colombia) Nicolás Mejía (Dominican Republic) Peter Bertran	(United States) Toby Kodat (Ecuador) Andrés Andrade (United States) Bruno Kuzuhara (United States) Axel Nefve
February 5	Sunrise, United States; Clay; M15; Singles and Doubles Draws	(Ecuador) Andrés Andrade (United States) Alex Rybakov; 6–3, 6–3	(United States) Harrison Adams (Peru) Alexander Merino	(Colombia) Nicolás Mejía (Dominican Republic) Peter Bertran	(United States) Toby Kodat (Ecuador) Andrés Andrade (United States) Bruno Kuzuhara (United States) Axel Nefve
February 12	Vila Real de Santo António, Portugal; Hard; M25; Singles and Doubles Draws	(Spain) Martín Landaluce; 6–0, 6–3	(Uzbekistan) Khumoyun Sultanov	(Brazil) Karue Sell (Portugal) Pedro Araújo	(Netherlands) Jelle Sels (Spain) Carlos López Montagud (Uzbekistan) Sergey Fomin (Spain) Alberto Barroso Campos
February 12	Vila Real de Santo António, Portugal; Hard; M25; Singles and Doubles Draws	(Argentina) Juan Pablo Ficovich (Brazil) João Eduardo Schiessl; 6–2, 4–6, [10–5]	(Portugal) Diogo Marques (Portugal) Martim Simões	(Brazil) Karue Sell (Portugal) Pedro Araújo	(Netherlands) Jelle Sels (Spain) Carlos López Montagud (Uzbekistan) Sergey Fomin (Spain) Alberto Barroso Campos
February 12	Hammamet, Tunisia; Clay; M25; Singles and Doubles Draws	(Spain) Pol Martín Tiffon; 6–3, 6–3	(Romania) Filip Cristian Jianu	(Ukraine) Oleksandr Ovcharenko (Switzerland) Johan Nikles	(Italy) Pietro Marino (Italy) Alessandro Ingarao (Switzerland) Damien Wenger (Spain) Carlos Sánchez Jover
February 12	Hammamet, Tunisia; Clay; M25; Singles and Doubles Draws	(United Kingdom) Jay Clarke (Austria) Sandro Kopp; 6–2, 7–5	(France) Corentin Denolly (Switzerland) Damien Wenger	(Ukraine) Oleksandr Ovcharenko (Switzerland) Johan Nikles	(Italy) Pietro Marino (Italy) Alessandro Ingarao (Switzerland) Damien Wenger (Spain) Carlos Sánchez Jover
February 12	Antalya, Turkey; Clay; M25; Singles and Doubles Draws	(Spain) Daniel Mérida; 4–6, 7–5, 6–3	(Dominican Republic) Nick Hardt	(Romania) Cezar Crețu (Lithuania) Vilius Gaubas	(France) Clément Tabur (Romania) Sebastian Gima (Lebanon) Hady Habib (Austria) Lukas Neumayer
February 12	Antalya, Turkey; Clay; M25; Singles and Doubles Draws	(Turkey) Gökberk Sarıtaş (Turkey) Mert Naci Türker; 4–6, 6–3, [10–7]	(Bulgaria) Anthony Genov (Ukraine) Nikita Mashtakov	(Romania) Cezar Crețu (Lithuania) Vilius Gaubas	(France) Clément Tabur (Romania) Sebastian Gima (Lebanon) Hady Habib (Austria) Lukas Neumayer
February 12	Punta del Este, Uruguay; Clay; M25; Singles and Doubles Draws	(Bolivia) Murkel Dellien; 6–1, 6–0	(Ecuador) Álvaro Guillén Meza	(Spain) Àlex Martí Pujolràs (Argentina) Hernán Casanova	(Uruguay) Joaquín Aguilar Cardozo (Argentina) Juan Bautista Otegui (Argentina) Facundo Mena (Argentina) Gonzalo Villanueva
February 12	Punta del Este, Uruguay; Clay; M25; Singles and Doubles Draws	(Uruguay) Franco Roncadelli (Brazil) Paulo André Saraiva dos Santos; 4–6, 6–3, [10–5]	(Chile) Nicolás Bruna (Argentina) Juan Bautista Otegui	(Spain) Àlex Martí Pujolràs (Argentina) Hernán Casanova	(Uruguay) Joaquín Aguilar Cardozo (Argentina) Juan Bautista Otegui (Argentina) Facundo Mena (Argentina) Gonzalo Villanueva
February 12	Sharm El Sheikh, Egypt; Hard; M15; Singles and Doubles Draws	(Czech Republic) Marek Gengel; 6–2, 6–2	(Netherlands) Niels Visker	(United Kingdom) Emile Hudd (Ukraine) Oleg Prihodko	(Georgia (country)) Saba Purtseladze (Egypt) Amr Elsayed (Japan) Rei Sakamoto (Georgia (country)) Zura Tkemaladze
February 12	Sharm El Sheikh, Egypt; Hard; M15; Singles and Doubles Draws	(Czech Republic) Jan Hrazdil (Japan) Rei Sakamoto; 6–3, 6–7^{(8–10)}, [11–9]	(United Kingdom) Emile Hudd (United Kingdom) David Stevenson	(United Kingdom) Emile Hudd (Ukraine) Oleg Prihodko	(Georgia (country)) Saba Purtseladze (Egypt) Amr Elsayed (Japan) Rei Sakamoto (Georgia (country)) Zura Tkemaladze
February 12	Oberhaching, Germany; Hard (i); M15; Singles and Doubles Draws	(Republic of Ireland) Michael Agwi; 7–6^{(7–3)}, 6–1	(Germany) Max Hans Rehberg	(Germany) Tom Gentzsch (Slovakia) Miloš Karol	(Croatia) Mili Poljičak (Switzerland) Yannik Steinegger (France) Sascha Gueymard Wayenburg (France) Fabien Salle
February 12	Oberhaching, Germany; Hard (i); M15; Singles and Doubles Draws	(Germany) Daniel Masur (Croatia) Mili Poljičak; 5–7, 6–3, [10–8]	(Italy) Giovanni Oradini (Czech Republic) Matěj Vocel	(Germany) Tom Gentzsch (Slovakia) Miloš Karol	(Croatia) Mili Poljičak (Switzerland) Yannik Steinegger (France) Sascha Gueymard Wayenburg (France) Fabien Salle
February 12	Nakhon Si Thammarat, Thailand; Hard; M15; Singles and Doubles Drawa	(Brazil) Gabriel Décamps; 6–2, 6–4	(China) Cui Jie	(Netherlands) Sander Jong (Greece) Stefanos Sakellaridis	(Chinese Taipei) Huang Tsung-hao (Indonesia) Muhammad Rifqi Fitriadi (Thailand) Maximus Jones (Switzerland) Luca Castelnuovo
February 12	Nakhon Si Thammarat, Thailand; Hard; M15; Singles and Doubles Drawa	(Chinese Taipei) Huang Tsung-hao (South Korea) Jeong Yeong-seok; 6–0, 7–6^{(7–3)}	(Malaysia) Mitsuki Wei Kang Leong (India) Nitin Kumar Sinha	(Netherlands) Sander Jong (Greece) Stefanos Sakellaridis	(Chinese Taipei) Huang Tsung-hao (Indonesia) Muhammad Rifqi Fitriadi (Thailand) Maximus Jones (Switzerland) Luca Castelnuovo
February 12	Monastir, Tunisia; Hard; M15; Singles and Doubles Draws	(United States) Ulises Blanch; 0–6, 6–3, 6–4	(Croatia) Matej Dodig	(Italy) Luca Castagnola (Italy) Fausto Tabacco	(France) Louis Dussin (Italy) Carlo Alberto Caniato (Morocco) Elliot Benchetrit (United States) Ezekiel Clark
February 12	Monastir, Tunisia; Hard; M15; Singles and Doubles Draws	Igor Kudriashov; Aleksandr Lobanov; 6–3, 0–6, [14–12]	(Costa Rica) Jesse Flores (Italy) Luca Potenza	(Italy) Luca Castagnola (Italy) Fausto Tabacco	(France) Louis Dussin (Italy) Carlo Alberto Caniato (Morocco) Elliot Benchetrit (United States) Ezekiel Clark
February 12	Palm Coast, United States; Clay; M15; Singles and Doubles Draws	(Kazakhstan) Dmitry Popko; 7–5, 1–6, 7–5	(Ecuador) Andrés Andrade	(United States) Alex Rybakov (Romania) Gabi Adrian Boitan	(United States) Toby Kodat (Dominican Republic) Roberto Cid Subervi (United States) Bruno Kuzuhara (United States) Axel Nefwe
February 12	Palm Coast, United States; Clay; M15; Singles and Doubles Draws	(Ecuador) Andrés Andrade (United States) Alex Rybakov; 6–1, 6–3	(Colombia) Juan Sebastián Gómez (New Zealand) Finn Reynolds	(United States) Alex Rybakov (Romania) Gabi Adrian Boitan	(United States) Toby Kodat (Dominican Republic) Roberto Cid Subervi (United States) Bruno Kuzuhara (United States) Axel Nefwe
February 19	Traralgon, Australia; Hard; M25; Singles and Doubles Draws	(Australia) Omar Jasika; 7–6^{(7–1)}, 6–2	(Australia) Li Tu	(Australia) Alex Bolt (Australia) James McCabe	(United States) Christian Langmo (Australia) Blake Ellis (Japan) Hiroki Moriya (Australia) Luke Saville
February 19	Traralgon, Australia; Hard; M25; Singles and Doubles Draws	(Australia) Matt Hulme (New Zealand) James Watt; 6–3, 7–6^{(7–4)}	(Australia) Joshua Charlton (Australia) Blake Ellis	(Australia) Alex Bolt (Australia) James McCabe	(United States) Christian Langmo (Australia) Blake Ellis (Japan) Hiroki Moriya (Australia) Luke Saville
February 19	Trento, Italy; Hard; M25; Singles and Doubles Draws	(Germany) Daniel Masur; 7–6^{(7–5)}, 6–3	(Italy) Giovanni Oradini	(France) Sascha Gueymard Wayenburg (Estonia) Daniil Glinka	(Georgia (country)) Nikoloz Basilashvili (France) Antoine Hoang (Belgium) Tibo Colson (Switzerland) Jérôme Kym
February 19	Trento, Italy; Hard; M25; Singles and Doubles Draws	(Germany) Daniel Masur (Austria) Neil Oberleitner; 6–2, 6–4	(Italy) Giorgio Ricca (Italy) Augusto Virgili	(France) Sascha Gueymard Wayenburg (Estonia) Daniil Glinka	(Georgia (country)) Nikoloz Basilashvili (France) Antoine Hoang (Belgium) Tibo Colson (Switzerland) Jérôme Kym
February 19	Vila Real de Santo António, Portugal; Hard; M25; Singles and Doubles Draws	(Portugal) Jaime Faria; 6–3, 6–0	(Netherlands) Jelle Sels	(United States) Nathan Ponwith (Norway) Viktor Durasovic	(Spain) John Echeverría (Denmark) Elmer Møller (Argentina) Julio César Porras; Yaroslav Demin
February 19	Vila Real de Santo António, Portugal; Hard; M25; Singles and Doubles Draws	(Portugal) Jaime Faria (Portugal) João Domingues; 7–6^{(7–2)}, 7–6^{(7–2)}	(Australia) Thomas Fancutt (United States) Hunter Reese	(United States) Nathan Ponwith (Norway) Viktor Durasovic	(Spain) John Echeverría (Denmark) Elmer Møller (Argentina) Julio César Porras; Yaroslav Demin
February 19	Hammamet, Tunisia; Clay; M25; Singles and Doubles Draws	(United Kingdom) Jay Clarke; 4–6, 6–2, 6–3	(Austria) Sandro Kopp	(Romania) Sebastian Gima (Spain) Carlos Sánchez Jover	(Turkey) Aziz Ouakaa (Germany) Peter Heller (Spain) Pol Martín Tiffon (Czech Republic) Dominik Kellovský
February 19	Hammamet, Tunisia; Clay; M25; Singles and Doubles Draws	(Germany) Peter Heller (Czech Republic) Dominik Kellovský; 6–4, 6–4	(Italy) Niccolò Catini (Italy) Gabriele Maria Noce	(Romania) Sebastian Gima (Spain) Carlos Sánchez Jover	(Turkey) Aziz Ouakaa (Germany) Peter Heller (Spain) Pol Martín Tiffon (Czech Republic) Dominik Kellovský
February 19	Antalya, Turkey; Clay; M25; Singles and Doubles Draws	(Spain) Carlos Gimeno Valero; 1–6, 7–6^{(7–1)}, 7–5	(Lithuania) Vilius Gaubas	(Romania) Cezar Crețu (Germany) Tim Handel	(France) Maxime Chazal (Netherlands) Max Houkes (Germany) Lucas Gerch (Croatia) Nino Serdarušić
February 19	Antalya, Turkey; Clay; M25; Singles and Doubles Draws	(Turkey) Umut Akkoyun (Turkey) Süleyman Mert Özdemir; 7–6^{(7–1)}, 7–6^{(7–4)}	(Turkey) Cengiz Aksu (Turkey) Mert Naci Türker	(Romania) Cezar Crețu (Germany) Tim Handel	(France) Maxime Chazal (Netherlands) Max Houkes (Germany) Lucas Gerch (Croatia) Nino Serdarušić
February 19	Naples, United States; Clay; M25; Singles and Doubles Draws	(Kazakhstan) Dmitry Popko; 3–6, 7–6^{(7–4)}, 6–4	(Ecuador) Andrés Andrade	(United States) Tristan McCormick (Dominican Republic) Roberto Cid Subervi	(United States) Alex Rybakov (United States) Felix Corwin (Romania) Adrian Boitan (United States) Toby Kodat
February 19	Naples, United States; Clay; M25; Singles and Doubles Draws	(United States) Mac Kiger (Canada) Benjamin Sigouin; 6–2, 6–7^{(7–9)}, [10–6]	(United States) Hunter Heck (Japan) Kenta Miyoshi	(United States) Tristan McCormick (Dominican Republic) Roberto Cid Subervi	(United States) Alex Rybakov (United States) Felix Corwin (Romania) Adrian Boitan (United States) Toby Kodat
February 19	Villa María, Argentina; Clay; M15; Singles and Doubles Draws	(Argentina) Mariano Kestelboim; 6–3, 6–0	(Argentina) Facundo Mena	(Spain) Àlex Martí Pujolràs (Argentina) Alejo Lorenzo Lingua Lavallén	(Ecuador) Álvaro Guillén Meza (Argentina) Luciano Emanuel Ambrogi (Brazil) Pedro Boscardin Dias (Argentina) Juan Bautista Otegui
February 19	Villa María, Argentina; Clay; M15; Singles and Doubles Draws	(Argentina) Mateo del Pino (Argentina) Juan Manuel La Serna; 6–2, 6–1	(Argentina) Luciano Emanuel Ambrogi (Argentina) Alejo Lorenzo Lingua Lavallén	(Spain) Àlex Martí Pujolràs (Argentina) Alejo Lorenzo Lingua Lavallén	(Ecuador) Álvaro Guillén Meza (Argentina) Luciano Emanuel Ambrogi (Brazil) Pedro Boscardin Dias (Argentina) Juan Bautista Otegui
February 19	Sharm El Sheikh, Egypt; Hard; M15; Singles and Doubles Draws	(South Africa) Philip Henning; 6–3, 6–3	(Netherlands) Mees Röttgering	(France) Antoine Ghibaudo (Germany) Patrick Zahraj	(Poland) Tomasz Berkieta (Egypt) Michael Bassem Sobhy (France) Amaury Raynel (Estonia) Kristjan Tamm
February 19	Sharm El Sheikh, Egypt; Hard; M15; Singles and Doubles Draws	(Georgia (country)) Aleksandre Bakshi (Spain) David Pérez Sanz; 4–6, 6–2, [10–4]	(South Africa) Philip Henning (United Kingdom) Ben Jones	(France) Antoine Ghibaudo (Germany) Patrick Zahraj	(Poland) Tomasz Berkieta (Egypt) Michael Bassem Sobhy (France) Amaury Raynel (Estonia) Kristjan Tamm
February 19	Villena, Spain; Hard; M15; Singles and Doubles Draws	(Spain) Alejo Sánchez Quílez; 6–4, 4–6, 6–2	(Chile) Diego Fernández Flores	(Bulgaria) Nikolay Nedelchev (France) Lilian Marmousez	(Colombia) Adrià Soriano Barrera (Germany) Tom Gentzsch (Spain) Daniel Mérida (Sweden) Adam Heinonen
February 19	Villena, Spain; Hard; M15; Singles and Doubles Draws	(Germany) Liam Gavrielides (Spain) Alejo Sánchez Quílez; 6–2, 6–4	(Luxembourg) Alex Knaff (Colombia) Adrià Soriano Barrera	(Bulgaria) Nikolay Nedelchev (France) Lilian Marmousez	(Colombia) Adrià Soriano Barrera (Germany) Tom Gentzsch (Spain) Daniel Mérida (Sweden) Adam Heinonen
February 19	Nakhon Si Thammarat, Thailand; Hard; M15; Singles and Doubles Draws	(Vietnam) Lý Hoàng Nam; 6–7^{(4–7)}, 7–6^{(7–2)}, 6–4	(Netherlands) Sander Jong	(Germany) Maik Steiner (Israel) Orel Kimhi	(China) Bai Yan (Greece) Stefanos Sakellaridis (Brazil) Gabriel Décamps (Thailand) Maximus Jones
February 19	Nakhon Si Thammarat, Thailand; Hard; M15; Singles and Doubles Draws	(Thailand) Pruchya Isaro (Indonesia) Christopher Rungkat; 6–4, 4–6, [10–8]	(Chinese Taipei) Huang Tsung-hao (South Korea) Jeong Yeong-seok	(Germany) Maik Steiner (Israel) Orel Kimhi	(China) Bai Yan (Greece) Stefanos Sakellaridis (Brazil) Gabriel Décamps (Thailand) Maximus Jones
February 19	Monastir, Tunisia; Hard; M15; Singles and Doubles Draws	(Croatia) Matej Dodig; 3–6, 6–3, 6–0	(Italy) Federico Cinà	(France) Adrien Gobat (Switzerland) Mika Brunold	(Switzerland) Jakub Paul (United States) Ezekiel Clark (Austria) Joel Schwärzler (Czech Republic) Matthew William Donald
February 19	Monastir, Tunisia; Hard; M15; Singles and Doubles Draws	(Peru) Alexander Merino (Germany) Christoph Negritu; 6–3, 6–3	(Slovakia) Miloš Karol (Switzerland) Jakub Paul	(France) Adrien Gobat (Switzerland) Mika Brunold	(Switzerland) Jakub Paul (United States) Ezekiel Clark (Austria) Joel Schwärzler (Czech Republic) Matthew William Donald
February 26
February 26	Tucumán, Argentina; Clay; M25; Singles and Doubles Draws	Match between (Brazil) Pedro Sakamoto and (Kazakhstan) Dmitry Popko was cancelled due to ongoing poor weather		(Canada) Liam Draxl (Argentina) Federico Juan Aguilar	(Uruguay) Joaquín Aguilar Cardozo (Brazil) Nicolas Zanellato (Bolivia) Juan Carlos Prado Ángelo (Ecuador) Álvaro Guillén Meza
February 26	Tucumán, Argentina; Clay; M25; Singles and Doubles Draws	(Uruguay) Federico Aguilar Cardozo (Uruguay) Joaquín Aguilar Cardozo; 6–4, 6–3	(Argentina) Luciano Ambrogi (Argentina) Franco Ribero	(Canada) Liam Draxl (Argentina) Federico Juan Aguilar	(Uruguay) Joaquín Aguilar Cardozo (Brazil) Nicolas Zanellato (Bolivia) Juan Carlos Prado Ángelo (Ecuador) Álvaro Guillén Meza
February 26	Traralgon, Australia; Hard; M25; Singles and Doubles Draws	(Australia) Li Tu; 6–4, 6–2	(Australia) Alex Bolt	(Australia) Luke Saville (Japan) Hiroki Moriya	(United States) Andre Ilagan (China) Liu Hanyi (Australia) Blake Ellis (Australia) Omar Jasika
February 26	Traralgon, Australia; Hard; M25; Singles and Doubles Draws	(Australia) Joshua Charlton (Australia) Blake Ellis; 6–1, 6–3	(Australia) Jesse Delaney (New Zealand) Ajeet Rai	(Australia) Luke Saville (Japan) Hiroki Moriya	(United States) Andre Ilagan (China) Liu Hanyi (Australia) Blake Ellis (Australia) Omar Jasika
February 26	Faro, Portugal; Hard; M25; Singles and Doubles Draws	(Portugal) Jaime Faria; 6–1, 6–3	(Lithuania) Vilius Gaubas	(Czech Republic) Michael Vrbenský (Australia) Matthew Dellavedova	(France) Evan Furness (Czech Republic) Hynek Bartoň (Turkey) Altuğ Çelikbilek (United States) Keegan Smith
February 26	Faro, Portugal; Hard; M25; Singles and Doubles Draws	(Bulgaria) Alexander Donski (Portugal) Tiago Pereira; 6–4, 3–6, [10–7]	(Sweden) Simon Freund (Denmark) Johannes Ingildsen	(Czech Republic) Michael Vrbenský (Australia) Matthew Dellavedova	(France) Evan Furness (Czech Republic) Hynek Bartoň (Turkey) Altuğ Çelikbilek (United States) Keegan Smith
February 26	Sharm El Sheikh, Egypt; Hard; M15; Singles and Doubles Draws	(South Africa) Philip Henning; 6–3, 6–3	(Egypt) Fares Zakaria	(Poland) Tomasz Berkieta (Germany) Adrian Oetzbach	(Georgia (country)) Aleksandre Bakshi (United Kingdom) Ben Jones (Slovakia) Michal Krajčí (Poland) Szymon Kielan
February 26	Sharm El Sheikh, Egypt; Hard; M15; Singles and Doubles Draws	(Germany) Tim Rühl (Germany) Patrick Zahraj; 6–7^{(5–7)}, 6–3, [10–2]	(Germany) Adrian Oetzbach (United Kingdom) Joe Tyler	(Poland) Tomasz Berkieta (Germany) Adrian Oetzbach	(Georgia (country)) Aleksandre Bakshi (United Kingdom) Ben Jones (Slovakia) Michal Krajčí (Poland) Szymon Kielan
February 26	Lannion, France; Hard (i); M15; Singles and Doubles Draws	(France) Maé Malige; 6–1, 6–3	(France) Yanis Ghazouani Durand	(France) Alexandre Aubriot (France) Théo Papamalamis	(Estonia) Oliver Ojakäär (Germany) Jimmy Yang (France) Antoine Hoang; Kirill Kivattsev
February 26	Lannion, France; Hard (i); M15; Singles and Doubles Draws	(Italy) Federico Bondioli (Italy) Filippo Romano; 6–4, 4–6, [11–9]	(France) Yanis Ghazouani Durand (France) Loann Massard	(France) Alexandre Aubriot (France) Théo Papamalamis	(Estonia) Oliver Ojakäär (Germany) Jimmy Yang (France) Antoine Hoang; Kirill Kivattsev
February 26	Kish Island, Iran; Clay; M15; Singles and Doubles Draws	(Romania) Filip Cristian Jianu; 7−5, 6−4	(Serbia) Branko Đurić	(Romania) Dan Alexandru Tomescu; Saveliy Ivanov	Maxim Zhukov (Lebanon) Fadi Bidan (Hungary) Mátyás Füle; Denis Klok
February 26	Kish Island, Iran; Clay; M15; Singles and Doubles Draws	(Hungary) Mátyás Füle (Hungary) Gergely Madarász; 5–7, 6–4, [10–6]	(India) Ishaque Eqbal (India) Adil Kalyanpur	(Romania) Dan Alexandru Tomescu; Saveliy Ivanov	Maxim Zhukov (Lebanon) Fadi Bidan (Hungary) Mátyás Füle; Denis Klok
February 26	Villena, Spain; Hard; M15; Singles and Doubles Draws	(Italy) Giorgio Tabacco; 4–6, 6–4, 6–2	(Germany) Liam Gavrielides	(Norway) Nicolai Budkov Kjær (Italy) Fausto Tabacco	(Luxembourg) Alex Knaff (Spain) Alejo Sánchez Quílez (Spain) Miguel Damas (Spain) Sergio Callejón Hernando
February 26	Villena, Spain; Hard; M15; Singles and Doubles Draws	(United Kingdom) James Davis (United Kingdom) Matthew Summers; 6–1, 6–2	(Italy) Marco Berti (Italy) Federico Iannaccone	(Norway) Nicolai Budkov Kjær (Italy) Fausto Tabacco	(Luxembourg) Alex Knaff (Spain) Alejo Sánchez Quílez (Spain) Miguel Damas (Spain) Sergio Callejón Hernando
February 26	Nakhon Si Thammarat, Thailand; Hard; M15; Singles and Doubles Draws	(China) Cui Jie; 6–4, 3–6, 6–3	(Greece) Stefanos Sakellaridis	(Germany) Maik Steiner (Israel) Orel Kimhi	(Thailand) Credit Chaiyarin (Thailand) Maximus Jones (Netherlands) Sander Jong (Thailand) Kasidit Samrej
February 26	Nakhon Si Thammarat, Thailand; Hard; M15; Singles and Doubles Draws	(China) Zhao Zhao (China) Zheng Zhan; 6–3, 6–4	(Chinese Taipei) Huang Tsung-hao (South Korea) Jeong Yeong-seok	(Germany) Maik Steiner (Israel) Orel Kimhi	(Thailand) Credit Chaiyarin (Thailand) Maximus Jones (Netherlands) Sander Jong (Thailand) Kasidit Samrej
February 26	Monastir, Tunisia; Hard; M15; Singles and Doubles Draws	(Czech Republic) Jakub Nicod; 6–3, 6–4	(Belgium) Simon Beaupain	(Germany) Max Wiskandt (Slovakia) Miloš Karol	(Italy) Lorenzo Carboni; Mikhail Gorokhov (Sweden) Fred Simonsson (France) Thomas Deschamps
February 26	Monastir, Tunisia; Hard; M15; Singles and Doubles Draws	(Peru) Alexander Merino (Germany) Christoph Negritu; 7–6^{(7–3)}, 6–3	(Slovakia) Miloš Karol (Sweden) Fred Simonsson	(Germany) Max Wiskandt (Slovakia) Miloš Karol	(Italy) Lorenzo Carboni; Mikhail Gorokhov (Sweden) Fred Simonsson (France) Thomas Deschamps
February 26	Antalya, Turkey; Clay; M15; Singles and Doubles Draws	(Bulgaria) Yanaki Milev; 6–3, 6–1	(Italy) Giuseppe La Vela	Svyatoslav Gulin (Czech Republic) Dominik Kellovský	(Czech Republic) Martin Krumich (Romania) Ștefan Adrian Andreescu (Romania) Vlad Andrei Dancu (Germany) Lucas Gerch
February 26	Antalya, Turkey; Clay; M15; Singles and Doubles Draws	(Bulgaria) Anthony Genov; Svyatoslav Gulin; 6–3, 7–6^{(7–4)}	(Czech Republic) Dominik Kellovský (Romania) Bogdan Pavel	Svyatoslav Gulin (Czech Republic) Dominik Kellovský	(Czech Republic) Martin Krumich (Romania) Ștefan Adrian Andreescu (Romania) Vlad Andrei Dancu (Germany) Lucas Gerch

=== March ===
Week of	Tournament	Winner	Runners-up	Semifinalists	Quarterfinalists
March 4
March 4	Recife, Brazil; Clay (i); M25; Singles and Doubles Draws	(Argentina) Juan Pablo Ficovich; 6–4, 6–7^{(4–7)}, 6–3	(Kazakhstan) Dmitry Popko	(Brazil) Eduardo Ribeiro (Brazil) Mateus Alves	(Brazil) Daniel Dutra da Silva (Brazil) João Menezes (Argentina) Leonardo Aboian (France) Paul Valsecchi
March 4	Recife, Brazil; Clay (i); M25; Singles and Doubles Draws	(Brazil) Daniel Dutra da Silva (Kazakhstan) Dmitry Popko; 6–3, 6–4	(Brazil) Luís Britto (Brazil) Paulo André Saraiva dos Santos	(Brazil) Eduardo Ribeiro (Brazil) Mateus Alves	(Brazil) Daniel Dutra da Silva (Brazil) João Menezes (Argentina) Leonardo Aboian (France) Paul Valsecchi
March 4	Santo Domingo, Dominican Republic; Hard; M25; Singles and Doubles Draws	(United States) Thai-Son Kwiatkowski; 6–4, 6–4	(Dominican Republic) Nick Hardt	(United States) Omni Kumar (New Zealand) Kiranpal Pannu	(United States) Andrew Fenty (Colombia) Nicolás Mejía (United Kingdom) Charles Broom (Spain) Iván Marrero Curbelo
March 4	Santo Domingo, Dominican Republic; Hard; M25; Singles and Doubles Draws	(Colombia) Nicolás Mejía (Colombia) Andrés Urrea; 7–6^{(7–2)}, 3–6, [10–7]	(United Kingdom) Charles Broom (United Kingdom) David Stevenson	(United States) Omni Kumar (New Zealand) Kiranpal Pannu	(United States) Andrew Fenty (Colombia) Nicolás Mejía (United Kingdom) Charles Broom (Spain) Iván Marrero Curbelo
March 4	Quinta do Lago, Portugal; Hard; M25; Singles and Doubles Draws	(Portugal) Jaime Faria; 6–7^{(6–8)}, 7–6^{(7–3)}, 6–1	(Lebanon) Hady Habib	(Portugal) Henrique Rocha (Norway) Viktor Durasovic	(United Kingdom) George Loffhagen (United States) Keegan Smith (Portugal) Duarte Vale (Portugal) Gastão Elias
March 4	Quinta do Lago, Portugal; Hard; M25; Singles and Doubles Draws	(Brazil) Gabriel Décamps (Finland) Eero Vasa; 6–2, 6–7^{(3–7)}, [10–7]	(Bulgaria) Alexander Donski (Portugal) Tiago Pereira	(Portugal) Henrique Rocha (Norway) Viktor Durasovic	(United Kingdom) George Loffhagen (United States) Keegan Smith (Portugal) Duarte Vale (Portugal) Gastão Elias
March 4	Poreč, Croatia; Clay; M15; Singles and Doubles Draws	(Austria) Sandro Kopp; 6–3, 6–2	(France) Luka Pavlovic	(Italy) Federico Arnaboldi (United Kingdom) Jay Clarke	(Germany) Timo Stodder (Italy) Michele Ribecai (Serbia) Stefan Popović (Italy) Tommaso Compagnucci
March 4	Poreč, Croatia; Clay; M15; Singles and Doubles Draws	(Croatia) Alen Bill (Croatia) Luka Mikrut; 6–1, 7–5	(Croatia) Nikola Bašić (Croatia) Mili Poljičak	(Italy) Federico Arnaboldi (United Kingdom) Jay Clarke	(Germany) Timo Stodder (Italy) Michele Ribecai (Serbia) Stefan Popović (Italy) Tommaso Compagnucci
March 4	Sharm El Sheikh, Egypt; Hard; M15; Singles and Doubles Draws	(Georgia (country)) Saba Purtseladze; 3–6, 6–3, 7–6^{(10–8)}	(Poland) Martyn Pawelski	(Egypt) Amr Elsayed; Petr Bar Biryukov	(China) Pang Renlong (Egypt) Michael Bassem Sobhy (South Africa) Philip Henning; Valentin Kopeikin
March 4	Sharm El Sheikh, Egypt; Hard; M15; Singles and Doubles Draws	Petr Bar Biryukov (Egypt) Amr Elsayed; 6–3, 6–4	(Poland) Szymon Kielan (Ukraine) Volodymyr Uzhylovskyi	(Egypt) Amr Elsayed; Petr Bar Biryukov	(China) Pang Renlong (Egypt) Michael Bassem Sobhy (South Africa) Philip Henning; Valentin Kopeikin
March 4	Poitiers, France; Hard (i); M15; Singles and Doubles Draws	(France) Fabien Salle; 6–7^{(7–9)}, 6–4, 6–2	(France) Théo Papamalamis	(France) Sascha Gueymard Wayenburg (Estonia) Daniil Glinka	(United Kingdom) Aidan McHugh (France) Cyril Vandermeersch (United Kingdom) Hamish Stewart (Estonia) Oliver Ojakäär
March 4	Poitiers, France; Hard (i); M15; Singles and Doubles Draws	(France) Yanis Ghazouani Durand (France) Loann Massard; 6–2, 7–6^{(7–4)}	(Belgium) Buvaysar Gadamauri (United Kingdom) Aidan McHugh	(France) Sascha Gueymard Wayenburg (Estonia) Daniil Glinka	(United Kingdom) Aidan McHugh (France) Cyril Vandermeersch (United Kingdom) Hamish Stewart (Estonia) Oliver Ojakäär
March 4	Heraklion, Greece; Hard; M15; Singles and Doubles Draws	(Switzerland) Adrian Bodmer; 6–3, 7–6^{(7–4)}	(Australia) Jacob Bradshaw	(United States) Drew Van Orderlain (Greece) Ioannis Xilas	(Japan) Ryuki Matsuda (Greece) Alexandros Skorilas (Italy) Samuele Pieri (Israel) Amit Vales
March 4	Heraklion, Greece; Hard; M15; Singles and Doubles Draws	(Cyprus) Sergis Kyratzis (Greece) Ioannis Xilas; 4–6, 6–3, [10–3]	(Greece) Dimitris Sakellaridis (Greece) Michalis Sakellaridis	(United States) Drew Van Orderlain (Greece) Ioannis Xilas	(Japan) Ryuki Matsuda (Greece) Alexandros Skorilas (Italy) Samuele Pieri (Israel) Amit Vales
March 4	Kish Island, Iran; Clay; M15; Singles and Doubles Draws	(Romania) Filip Cristian Jianu; 6–2, 6–3	(Hungary) Gergely Madarász	(Romania) Dan Alexandru Tomescu (Italy) Andrea Bacaloni	(Algeria) Samir Hamza Reguig (Bulgaria) Gabriel Donev (Argentina) Fernando Cavallo (India) Adil Kalyanpur
March 4	Kish Island, Iran; Clay; M15; Singles and Doubles Draws	(Hungary) Mátyás Füle (Hungary) Gergely Madarász; 6–4, 3–6, [10–6]	(India) Ishaque Eqbal (India) Adil Kalyanpur	(Romania) Dan Alexandru Tomescu (Italy) Andrea Bacaloni	(Algeria) Samir Hamza Reguig (Bulgaria) Gabriel Donev (Argentina) Fernando Cavallo (India) Adil Kalyanpur
March 4	Aktobe, Kazakhstan; Hard (i); M15; Singles and Doubles Draws	Evgeny Karlovskiy; 6–7^{(1–7)}, 6–1, 6–2	(Bulgaria) Petr Nesterov	(Netherlands) Niels Visker; Artur Kukasian	Erik Arutiunian; Ilia Simakin; Pavel Verbin; Egor Agafonov
March 4	Aktobe, Kazakhstan; Hard (i); M15; Singles and Doubles Draws	Pavel Verbin (Netherlands) Niels Visker; 7–6^{(10–8)}, 6–3	Aliaksandr Liaonenka; Alexander Zgirovsky	(Netherlands) Niels Visker; Artur Kukasian	Erik Arutiunian; Ilia Simakin; Pavel Verbin; Egor Agafonov
March 4	Torelló, Spain; Hard; M15; Singles and Doubles Draws	(Turkey) Ergi Kırkın; 7–6^{(10–8)}, 2–6, 7–5	(Colombia) Adrià Soriano Barrera	(United States) Darwin Blanch (United Kingdom) Giles Hussey	(Spain) Alejo Sánchez Quílez (France) Robin Bertrand (Georgia (country)) Nikoloz Basilashvili (Italy) Federico Iannaccone
March 4	Torelló, Spain; Hard; M15; Singles and Doubles Draws	(United Kingdom) James Davis (United Kingdom) Giles Hussey; 6–1, 6–2	(Luxembourg) Alex Knaff (Germany) Niklas Schell	(United States) Darwin Blanch (United Kingdom) Giles Hussey	(Spain) Alejo Sánchez Quílez (France) Robin Bertrand (Georgia (country)) Nikoloz Basilashvili (Italy) Federico Iannaccone
March 4	Monastir, Tunisia; Hard; M15; Singles and Doubles Draws	(Czech Republic) Jakub Nicod; 6–3, 6–2	(Italy) Luca Potenza	(Italy) Luca Castagnola (Italy) Luca Giacomini	(France) Thomas Deschamps (France) Benjamin Pietri (Germany) Christoph Negritu (Italy) Peter Buldorini
March 4	Monastir, Tunisia; Hard; M15; Singles and Doubles Draws	(Peru) Alexander Merino (Germany) Christoph Negritu; 7–6^{(7–4)}, 4–6, [10–8]	Igor Kudriashov; Aleksandr Lobanov	(Italy) Luca Castagnola (Italy) Luca Giacomini	(France) Thomas Deschamps (France) Benjamin Pietri (Germany) Christoph Negritu (Italy) Peter Buldorini
March 4	Antalya, Turkey; Clay; M15; Singles and Doubles Draws	(Netherlands) Stijn Slump; 6–4, 3–6, 6–4	(Bulgaria) Yanaki Milev	(Romania) Ștefan Paloși (Spain) Max Alcalá Gurri	(Bulgaria) Anthony Genov (Italy) Giuseppe La Vela (Italy) Gian Marco Moroni (Germany) Peter Heller
March 4	Antalya, Turkey; Clay; M15; Singles and Doubles Draws	(United States) Felix Corwin (Bulgaria) Anthony Genov; 6–2, 6–2	(Italy) Andrea Gola (Italy) Giuseppe La Vela	(Romania) Ștefan Paloși (Spain) Max Alcalá Gurri	(Bulgaria) Anthony Genov (Italy) Giuseppe La Vela (Italy) Gian Marco Moroni (Germany) Peter Heller
March 11
March 11	Mildura, Australia; Grass; M25; Singles and Doubles Draws	(Australia) Alex Bolt; 6–2, 6–2	(Australia) Luke Saville	(Australia) Blake Ellis (Australia) James McCabe	(Australia) Matt Hulme (Australia) Hayden Jones (China) Liu Hanyi (Australia) Joshua Charlton
March 11	Mildura, Australia; Grass; M25; Singles and Doubles Draws	(Australia) Joshua Charlton (Australia) Blake Ellis; 6–4, 6–7^{(4–7)}, [10–4]	(Australia) Matt Hulme (New Zealand) James Watt	(Australia) Blake Ellis (Australia) James McCabe	(Australia) Matt Hulme (Australia) Hayden Jones (China) Liu Hanyi (Australia) Joshua Charlton
March 11	Feira de Santana, Brazil; Hard; M25; Singles and Doubles Draws	(Kazakhstan) Dmitry Popko; 6–4, 6–4	(United States) Harrison Adams	(Germany) Louis Wessels (Brazil) Mateus Alves	(Brazil) Igor Gimenez (France) Rayane Oumaouche (Brazil) Daniel Dutra da Silva (Brazil) Joaquim Almeida
March 11	Feira de Santana, Brazil; Hard; M25; Singles and Doubles Draws	(United States) Harrison Adams (France) Quentin Folliot; 6–1, 6–3	(Brazil) José Pereira (Brazil) Gabriel Roveri Sidney	(Germany) Louis Wessels (Brazil) Mateus Alves	(Brazil) Igor Gimenez (France) Rayane Oumaouche (Brazil) Daniel Dutra da Silva (Brazil) Joaquim Almeida
March 11	Santo Domingo, Dominican Republic; Hard; M25; Singles and Doubles Draws	(United States) Thai-Son Kwiatkowski; 6–4, 7–6^{(7–3)}	(Ecuador) Andrés Andrade	(Dominican Republic) Peter Bertran (France) Jaimee Floyd Angele	(Croatia) Matija Pecotić (Dominican Republic) Roberto Cid Subervi (United States) Omni Kumar (United States) Trey Hilderbrand
March 11	Santo Domingo, Dominican Republic; Hard; M25; Singles and Doubles Draws	(Colombia) Nicolás Mejía (Colombia) Andrés Urrea; 6–7^{(5–7)}, 6–4, [10–5]	(United States) Trey Hilderbrand (United States) Pranav Kumar	(Dominican Republic) Peter Bertran (France) Jaimee Floyd Angele	(Croatia) Matija Pecotić (Dominican Republic) Roberto Cid Subervi (United States) Omni Kumar (United States) Trey Hilderbrand
March 11	Créteil, France; Hard (i); M25; Singles and Doubles Draws	(France) Alexis Gautier; 6–1, 4–6, 6–4	Alexey Vatutin	Nikolay Vylegzhanin (China) Sun Fajing	(France) Maxime Janvier (France) Yanis Ghazouani Durand (Belgium) Gauthier Onclin (France) Lucas Poullain
March 11	Créteil, France; Hard (i); M25; Singles and Doubles Draws	(Czech Republic) David Poljak (Czech Republic) Matěj Vocel; 6–3, 6–4	Alexey Vatutin; Nikolay Vylegzhanin	Nikolay Vylegzhanin (China) Sun Fajing	(France) Maxime Janvier (France) Yanis Ghazouani Durand (Belgium) Gauthier Onclin (France) Lucas Poullain
March 11	New Delhi, India; Hard; M25; Singles and Doubles Draws	(India) Ramkumar Ramanathan; 6–2, 6–2	(India) Karan Singh	Evgeny Donskoy (Vietnam) Lý Hoàng Nam	(France) Florent Bax (Thailand) Wishaya Trongcharoenchaikul (India) Siddharth Vishwakarma (India) Manish Sureshkumar
March 11	New Delhi, India; Hard; M25; Singles and Doubles Draws	(India) Siddhant Banthia (India) Vishnu Vardhan; 6–4, 6–1	(India) Parikshit Somani (India) Manish Sureshkumar	Evgeny Donskoy (Vietnam) Lý Hoàng Nam	(France) Florent Bax (Thailand) Wishaya Trongcharoenchaikul (India) Siddharth Vishwakarma (India) Manish Sureshkumar
March 11	Vale do Lobo, Portugal; Hard; M25; Singles and Doubles Draws	(Portugal) Jaime Faria; 6–2, 3–1, ret.	(Czech Republic) Hynek Bartoň	(Spain) Daniel Mérida (Spain) Mario González Fernández	(Italy) Federico Iannaccone (Portugal) Frederico Ferreira Silva (Portugal) Duarte Vale (Spain) Alberto Barroso Campos
March 11	Vale do Lobo, Portugal; Hard; M25; Singles and Doubles Draws	(Bulgaria) Alexander Donski (Portugal) Tiago Pereira; 6–4, 4–6, [10–8]	(Spain) Alberto Barroso Campos (Spain) Imanol López Morillo	(Spain) Daniel Mérida (Spain) Mario González Fernández	(Italy) Federico Iannaccone (Portugal) Frederico Ferreira Silva (Portugal) Duarte Vale (Spain) Alberto Barroso Campos
March 11	Trimbach, Switzerland; Carpet (i); M25; Singles and Doubles Draws	(Germany) Mats Rosenkranz; 6–1, 6–4	(France) Antoine Hoang	(Estonia) Daniil Glinka (Italy) Marcello Serafini	(United Kingdom) Aidan McHugh (Switzerland) Mika Brunold (United Kingdom) Anton Matusevich (Germany) Daniel Masur
March 11	Trimbach, Switzerland; Carpet (i); M25; Singles and Doubles Draws	(Germany) Niklas Schell (United Kingdom) Mark Whitehouse; 6–4, 6–4	(Germany) Mats Rosenkranz (Germany) Tom Schönenberg	(Estonia) Daniil Glinka (Italy) Marcello Serafini	(United Kingdom) Aidan McHugh (Switzerland) Mika Brunold (United Kingdom) Anton Matusevich (Germany) Daniel Masur
March 11	Bakersfield, United States; Hard; M25; Singles and Doubles Draws	(United States) Brandon Holt; 6–4, 6–4	(France) Timo Legout	(Chinese Taipei) Wu Tung-lin (Mexico) Ernesto Escobedo	(United States) Cash Hanzlik (Brazil) Karue Sell (United States) Elijah Strode (Denmark) August Holmgren
March 11	Bakersfield, United States; Hard; M25; Singles and Doubles Draws	(Denmark) August Holmgren (United States) Nathan Ponwith; 6–1, 7–6^{(7–4)}	(Australia) Patrick Harper (United Kingdom) Emile Hudd	(Chinese Taipei) Wu Tung-lin (Mexico) Ernesto Escobedo	(United States) Cash Hanzlik (Brazil) Karue Sell (United States) Elijah Strode (Denmark) August Holmgren
March 11	Rovinj, Croatia; Clay; M15; Singles and Doubles Draws	(Croatia) Matej Dodig; 7–6^{(7–4)}, 6–4	(United Kingdom) Jay Clarke	(Croatia) Mili Poljičak (Italy) Jacopo Berrettini	(Ukraine) Viacheslav Bielinskyi (Serbia) Stefan Popović (Italy) Federico Arnaboldi (Austria) Sandro Kopp
March 11	Rovinj, Croatia; Clay; M15; Singles and Doubles Draws	(Croatia) Luka Mikrut (Croatia) Mili Poljičak; 6–7^{(5–7)}, 7–5, [10–7]	(Italy) Leonardo Rossi (Italy) Luigi Sorrentino	(Croatia) Mili Poljičak (Italy) Jacopo Berrettini	(Ukraine) Viacheslav Bielinskyi (Serbia) Stefan Popović (Italy) Federico Arnaboldi (Austria) Sandro Kopp
March 11	Alaminos, Cyprus; Clay; M15; Singles and Doubles Draws	(Romania) Dan Alexandru Tomescu; 6–3, 6–4	(Germany) Lucas Gerch	(Israel) Yshai Oliel (Romania) Vlad Andrei Dancu	(Italy) Daniele Rapagnetta (Italy) Gianluca Cadenasso (France) Lilian Marmousez (Serbia) Miljan Zekić
March 11	Alaminos, Cyprus; Clay; M15; Singles and Doubles Draws	(Greece) Demetris Azoides (Cyprus) Menelaos Efstathiou; 6–3, 2–6, [10–8]	(Germany) Dominic Ducariu (Romania) Dan Alexandru Tomescu	(Israel) Yshai Oliel (Romania) Vlad Andrei Dancu	(Italy) Daniele Rapagnetta (Italy) Gianluca Cadenasso (France) Lilian Marmousez (Serbia) Miljan Zekić
March 11	Sharm El Sheikh, Egypt; Hard; M15; Singles and Doubles Draws	(Ukraine) Vadym Ursu; 7–5, 6–3	(South Africa) Kris van Wyk	(Egypt) Amr Elsayed (Ukraine) Yurii Dzhavakian	(Poland) Martyn Pawelski (United States) Joshua Sheehy (China) Jin Yuquan (Czech Republic) Marek Gengel
March 11	Sharm El Sheikh, Egypt; Hard; M15; Singles and Doubles Draws	(Poland) Szymon Kielan (United States) Joshua Sheehy; 7–5, 6–4	(Egypt) Amr Elsayed (South Africa) Kris van Wyk	(Egypt) Amr Elsayed (Ukraine) Yurii Dzhavakian	(Poland) Martyn Pawelski (United States) Joshua Sheehy (China) Jin Yuquan (Czech Republic) Marek Gengel
March 11	Heraklion, Greece; Hard; M15; Singles and Doubles Draws	(United States) Henrik Wiersholm; 6–4, 6–3	(Ukraine) Oleg Prihodko	(Greece) Alexandros Skorilas (Italy) Andrea Guerrieri	(Israel) Ron Ellouck (Australia) Jacob Bradshaw (Sweden) Adam Heinonen (New Zealand) Corban Crowther
March 11	Heraklion, Greece; Hard; M15; Singles and Doubles Draws	(Slovakia) Tomáš Lánik (Slovakia) Samuel Puškár; 7–6^{(7–2)}, 6–2	(Greece) Alexandros Skorilas (Greece) Aristotelis Thanos	(Greece) Alexandros Skorilas (Italy) Andrea Guerrieri	(Israel) Ron Ellouck (Australia) Jacob Bradshaw (Sweden) Adam Heinonen (New Zealand) Corban Crowther
March 11	Hinode, Japan; Hard; M15; Singles and Doubles Draws	(China) Bai Yan; 6–2, 6–4	(Greece) Stefanos Sakellaridis	(Japan) Ryotaro Taguchi (Japan) Hikaru Shiraishi	(China) Xiao Linang (China) Zhou Yi (Japan) Yuki Mochizuki (Japan) Kosuke Ogura
March 11	Hinode, Japan; Hard; M15; Singles and Doubles Draws	(South Korea) Lee Jea-moon (South Korea) Song Min-kyu; 6–4, 7–5	(Japan) Masamichi Imamura (Japan) Kaito Uesugi	(Japan) Ryotaro Taguchi (Japan) Hikaru Shiraishi	(China) Xiao Linang (China) Zhou Yi (Japan) Yuki Mochizuki (Japan) Kosuke Ogura
March 11	Aktobe, Kazahstan; Hard (i); M15; Singles and Doubles Draws	Ilia Simakin; 6–1, 6–1	Egor Agafonov	(Uzbekistan) Sergey Fomin; Daniil Ostapenkov	Evgeny Philippov (Kazakhstan) Arslanbek Aitkulov (Bulgaria) Petr Nesterov; Artur Kukasian
March 11	Aktobe, Kazahstan; Hard (i); M15; Singles and Doubles Draws	Egor Agafonov; Ilia Simakin; 6–3, 6–4	Aliaksandr Liaonenka; Alexander Zgirovsky	(Uzbekistan) Sergey Fomin; Daniil Ostapenkov	Evgeny Philippov (Kazakhstan) Arslanbek Aitkulov (Bulgaria) Petr Nesterov; Artur Kukasian
March 11	Les Franqueses del Vallès, Spain; Hard; M15; Singles and Doubles Draws	(United Kingdom) Giles Hussey; 4–6, 6–3, 6–1	(Colombia) Adrià Soriano Barrera	(Brazil) Gabriel Décamps (Georgia (country)) Nikoloz Basilashvili	(Spain) Nikolás Sánchez Izquierdo (Spain) Alejandro Melero Kretzer (Luxembourg) Alex Knaff (Turkey) Kuzey Çekirge
March 11	Les Franqueses del Vallès, Spain; Hard; M15; Singles and Doubles Draws	(Ukraine) Georgii Kravchenko (Bulgaria) Nikolay Nedelchev; 6–3, 6–2	(United Kingdom) Stefan Cooper (Netherlands) Ronetto van Tilburg	(Brazil) Gabriel Décamps (Georgia (country)) Nikoloz Basilashvili	(Spain) Nikolás Sánchez Izquierdo (Spain) Alejandro Melero Kretzer (Luxembourg) Alex Knaff (Turkey) Kuzey Çekirge
March 11	Monastir, Tunisia; Hard; M15; Singles and Doubles Draws	(Germany) Florian Broska; 7–6^{(7–2)}, 6–3	(Germany) Christoph Negritu	(France) Constantin Bittoun Kouzmine (Italy) Luca Castagnola	(Italy) Massimo Giunta (Italy) Andrea Bolla (Italy) Luca Potenza (Italy) Federico Cinà
March 11	Monastir, Tunisia; Hard; M15; Singles and Doubles Draws	(Germany) Florian Broska (Austria) Gregor Ramskogler; 7–5, 2–6, [10–8]	(Italy) Federico Cinà (Italy) Fabio De Michele	(France) Constantin Bittoun Kouzmine (Italy) Luca Castagnola	(Italy) Massimo Giunta (Italy) Andrea Bolla (Italy) Luca Potenza (Italy) Federico Cinà
March 11	Antalya, Turkey; Clay; M15; Singles and Doubles Draws	(Spain) Max Alcalá Gurri; 7–6^{(7–3)}, 7–6^{(7–5)}	(Czech Republic) Dominik Kellovský	(Italy) Francesco Ferrari (United Kingdom) Henry Searle	(Romania) Sebastian Gima (Austria) Joel Schwärzler (Italy) Giuseppe La Vela (Chinese Taipei) Lee Kuan-yi
March 11	Antalya, Turkey; Clay; M15; Singles and Doubles Draws	(Czech Republic) Jan Hrazdil (Austria) Joel Schwärzler; 6–1, 6–0	(Turkey) Mert Alkaya (Turkey) S Mert Özdemir	(Italy) Francesco Ferrari (United Kingdom) Henry Searle	(Romania) Sebastian Gima (Austria) Joel Schwärzler (Italy) Giuseppe La Vela (Chinese Taipei) Lee Kuan-yi
March 11	Punta del Este, Uruguay; Clay; M15; Singles and Doubles Draws	(Argentina) Juan Manuel La Serna; 6–3, 6–4	(Uruguay) Joaquín Aguilar Cardozo	(Argentina) Nikos Lehmann (Argentina) Franco Ribero	(Argentina) Lautaro Agustín Falabella (Argentina) Fermín Tenti (Uruguay) Ignacio Carou (Brazil) Bruno Fernandez
March 11	Punta del Este, Uruguay; Clay; M15; Singles and Doubles Draws	(Argentina) Mateo del Pino (Argentina) Juan Manuel La Serna; 4–6, 7–6^{(7–2)}, [10–5]	(Uruguay) Federico Aguilar Cardozo (Uruguay) Joaquín Aguilar Cardozo	(Argentina) Nikos Lehmann (Argentina) Franco Ribero	(Argentina) Lautaro Agustín Falabella (Argentina) Fermín Tenti (Uruguay) Ignacio Carou (Brazil) Bruno Fernandez
March 18	Swan Hill, Australia; Grass; M25; Singles and doubles draws	(Australia) Alex Bolt; 6–1, 6–2	(Japan) Rio Noguchi	(Australia) Blake Ellis (Japan) Shintaro Imai	(Australia) Kody Pearson (Australia) Thomas Braithwaite (Japan) Makoto Ochi (Australia) Luke Saville
March 18	Swan Hill, Australia; Grass; M25; Singles and doubles draws	(Australia) Hayden Jones (New Zealand) Ajeet Rai; 6–4, 6–4	(Australia) Jesse Delaney (Australia) Luke Saville	(Australia) Blake Ellis (Japan) Shintaro Imai	(Australia) Kody Pearson (Australia) Thomas Braithwaite (Japan) Makoto Ochi (Australia) Luke Saville
March 18	Maceió, Brazil; Clay (i); M25; Singles and doubles draws	(Brazil) Daniel Dutra da Silva; 4–6, 7–5, 6–3	(Brazil) Mateus Alves	(France) Quentin Folliot (Brazil) Igor Gimenez	(United States) Harrison Adams (Brazil) José Pereira (Brazil) Rafael Tosetto (Brazil) Paulo André Saraiva dos Santos
March 18	Maceió, Brazil; Clay (i); M25; Singles and doubles draws	(Brazil) Luís Britto (Brazil) Paulo André Saraiva dos Santos; 6–3, 7–6^{(7–3)}	(Brazil) Gabriel Roveri Sidney (Colombia) Andrés Urrea	(France) Quentin Folliot (Brazil) Igor Gimenez	(United States) Harrison Adams (Brazil) José Pereira (Brazil) Rafael Tosetto (Brazil) Paulo André Saraiva dos Santos
March 18	Toulouse-Balma, France; Hard (i); M25; Singles and doubles draws	(France) Clément Chidekh; 6–3, 6–2	(France) Maxime Janvier	(France) Antoine Escoffier (Belgium) Raphaël Collignon	(France) Alexis Gautier (United Kingdom) Arthur Fery (Belgium) Gauthier Onclin (Switzerland) Rémy Bertola
March 18	Toulouse-Balma, France; Hard (i); M25; Singles and doubles draws	(Switzerland) Rémy Bertola (France) Arthur Bouquier; 7–6^{(8–6)}, 5–7, [10–6]	(Czech Republic) David Poljak (Czech Republic) Matěj Vocel	(France) Antoine Escoffier (Belgium) Raphaël Collignon	(France) Alexis Gautier (United Kingdom) Arthur Fery (Belgium) Gauthier Onclin (Switzerland) Rémy Bertola
March 18	Loulé, Portugal; Hard; M25; Singles and doubles draws	(Colombia) Adrià Soriano Barrera; 6–3, 6–2	(France) Jules Marie	(Portugal) Pedro Araújo (Portugal) Duarte Vale	(South Africa) Alec Beckley (Spain) Rafael Izquierdo Luque (Germany) Sebastian Fanselow (Lebanon) Hady Habib
March 18	Loulé, Portugal; Hard; M25; Singles and doubles draws	(Bulgaria) Alexander Donski (Portugal) Tiago Pereira; 7–6^{(8–6)}, 2–6, [10–1]	(France) Dan Added (Czech Republic) Jakub Nicod	(Portugal) Pedro Araújo (Portugal) Duarte Vale	(South Africa) Alec Beckley (Spain) Rafael Izquierdo Luque (Germany) Sebastian Fanselow (Lebanon) Hady Habib
March 18	Badalona, Spain; Clay; M25; Singles and doubles draws	(Italy) Lorenzo Giustino; 3–6, 6–4, 6–3	(Spain) Àlex Martí Pujolràs	(Argentina) Hernán Casanova (United Kingdom) Jay Clarke	(Spain) Pol Martín Tiffon (Turkey) Kuzey Çekirge (Spain) Max Alcalá Gurri (Slovakia) Peter Benjamín Privara
March 18	Badalona, Spain; Clay; M25; Singles and doubles draws	(United Kingdom) Jay Clarke (Italy) Augusto Virgili; 6–3, 4–6, [11–9]	(Netherlands) Ryan Nijboer (Spain) Alejo Sánchez Quílez	(Argentina) Hernán Casanova (United Kingdom) Jay Clarke	(Spain) Pol Martín Tiffon (Turkey) Kuzey Çekirge (Spain) Max Alcalá Gurri (Slovakia) Peter Benjamín Privara
March 18	Calabasas, United States; Hard; M25; Singles and doubles draws	(United States) Trevor Svajda; 6–4, 6–1	(United States) Nishesh Basavareddy	(United States) Samir Banerjee (United Kingdom) Charles Broom	(Brazil) Karue Sell (Spain) Pablo Masjuan Ginel (United States) Brandon Holt (United States) Kyle Kang
March 18	Calabasas, United States; Hard; M25; Singles and doubles draws	(New Zealand) Finn Reynolds (Canada) Benjamin Sigouin; 4–6, 6–2, [13–11]	(United States) Kyle Kang (United States) Neel Rajesh	(United States) Samir Banerjee (United Kingdom) Charles Broom	(Brazil) Karue Sell (Spain) Pablo Masjuan Ginel (United States) Brandon Holt (United States) Kyle Kang
March 18	Opatija, Croatia; Clay; M15; Singles and doubles draws	(Ukraine) Oleksandr Ovcharenko; 6–1, 6–0	(Italy) Federico Arnaboldi	(Croatia) Mili Poljičak (Austria) Sebastian Sorger	(Italy) Giovanni Oradini (Serbia) Vuk Rađenović (Italy) Tommaso Compagnucci (Italy) Alessandro Pecci
March 18	Opatija, Croatia; Clay; M15; Singles and doubles draws	(Croatia) Luka Mikrut (Croatia) Mili Poljičak; 6–4, 6–2	(Italy) Tommaso Compagnucci (Italy) Luigi Sorrentino	(Croatia) Mili Poljičak (Austria) Sebastian Sorger	(Italy) Giovanni Oradini (Serbia) Vuk Rađenović (Italy) Tommaso Compagnucci (Italy) Alessandro Pecci
March 18	Alaminos, Cyprus; Clay; M15; Singles and doubles draws	(Germany) Lucas Gerch; 7–6^{(7–1)}, 7–6^{(7–5)}	(Romania) Ștefan Paloși	(Israel) Yshai Oliel (Romania) Dan Alexandru Tomescu	(France) Lilian Marmousez (Italy) Iannis Miletich (Netherlands) Brian Bozemoj (Romania) Vlad Andrei Dancu
March 18	Alaminos, Cyprus; Clay; M15; Singles and doubles draws	(Greece) Christos Antonopoulos (Cyprus) Eleftherios Neos; 6–4, 1–6, [10–5]	(Italy) Gianluca Cadenasso (Italy) Noah Perfetti	(Israel) Yshai Oliel (Romania) Dan Alexandru Tomescu	(France) Lilian Marmousez (Italy) Iannis Miletich (Netherlands) Brian Bozemoj (Romania) Vlad Andrei Dancu
March 18	Sharm El Sheikh, Egypt; Hard; M15; Singles and doubles draws	(Ukraine) Vadym Ursu; 6–0, 6–0	(South Africa) Kris van Wyk	(Poland) Olaf Pieczkowski (Ukraine) Yurii Dzhavakian	(Czech Republic) Marek Gengel (Poland) Martyn Pawelski (Italy) Federico Bondioli (Netherlands) Sander Jong
March 18	Sharm El Sheikh, Egypt; Hard; M15; Singles and doubles draws	(Ukraine) Illya Beloborodko (Ukraine) Yurii Dzhavakian; 6–4, 7–6^{(8–6)}	(Italy) Federico Bondioli (United Kingdom) George Houghton	(Poland) Olaf Pieczkowski (Ukraine) Yurii Dzhavakian	(Czech Republic) Marek Gengel (Poland) Martyn Pawelski (Italy) Federico Bondioli (Netherlands) Sander Jong
March 18	Heraklion, Greece; Hard; M15; Singles and doubles draws	(Slovakia) Martin Kližan; 6–4, 6–3	(Lithuania) Edas Butvilas	(Greece) Aristotelis Thanos (Italy) Andrea Guerrieri	(Greece) Ioannis Xilas (Georgia (country)) Zura Tkemaladze (Germany) Milan Welte (Brazil) Gabriel Décamps
March 18	Heraklion, Greece; Hard; M15; Singles and doubles draws	(Georgia (country)) Aleksandre Bakshi (Georgia (country)) Zura Tkemaladze; 6–2, 6–3	(Senegal) Seydina André (France) Nicolas Jadoun	(Greece) Aristotelis Thanos (Italy) Andrea Guerrieri	(Greece) Ioannis Xilas (Georgia (country)) Zura Tkemaladze (Germany) Milan Welte (Brazil) Gabriel Décamps
March 18	Chandigarh, India; Hard; M15; Singles and doubles draws	(Uzbekistan) Khumoyun Sultanov; 6–4, 6–2	(India) Ramkumar Ramanathan	(India) Sasikumar Mukund (Vietnam) Lý Hoàng Nam	(India) Siddharth Vishwakarma (Chinese Taipei) Yin Bang-shuo (Thailand) Thanapet Chanta (India) Chirag Duhan
March 18	Chandigarh, India; Hard; M15; Singles and doubles draws	(South Korea) Jang Yun-seok (South Korea) Shin Woo-bin; 6–4, 7–6^{(13–11)}	(India) Siddhant Banthia (India) Karan Singh	(India) Sasikumar Mukund (Vietnam) Lý Hoàng Nam	(India) Siddharth Vishwakarma (Chinese Taipei) Yin Bang-shuo (Thailand) Thanapet Chanta (India) Chirag Duhan
March 18	Nishitokyo, Japan; Hard; M15; Singles and doubles draws	(Japan) Hikaru Shiraishi; 6–4, 7–6^{(9–7)}	(South Korea) Lee Duck-hee	(Japan) Ryotaro Taguchi (Greece) Stefanos Sakellaridis	(China) Bai Yan (China) Cui Jie (Japan) Leo Vithoontien (South Korea) Chung Yun-seong
March 18	Nishitokyo, Japan; Hard; M15; Singles and doubles draws	(Japan) Yusuke Kusuhara (Japan) Yuki Mochizuki; 7–6^{(11–9)}, 7–5	(Japan) Yuhei Kono (Japan) Kazuki Nishiwaki	(Japan) Ryotaro Taguchi (Greece) Stefanos Sakellaridis	(China) Bai Yan (China) Cui Jie (Japan) Leo Vithoontien (South Korea) Chung Yun-seong
March 18	Monastir, Tunisia; Hard; M15; Singles and doubles draws	(Italy) Fabrizio Andaloro; 6–4, 3–6, 7–6^{(7–0)}	(Italy) Luca Potenza	(France) Cyril Vandermeersch (Germany) Florian Broska	(United States) Tauheed Browning (Belgium) Jack Logé (Italy) Massimo Giunta (France) Constantin Bittoun Kouzmine
March 18	Monastir, Tunisia; Hard; M15; Singles and doubles draws	Igor Kudriashov; Aleksandr Lobanov; 6–4, 6–1	(Belgium) Kylian Collignon (Slovenia) Matic Križnik	(France) Cyril Vandermeersch (Germany) Florian Broska	(United States) Tauheed Browning (Belgium) Jack Logé (Italy) Massimo Giunta (France) Constantin Bittoun Kouzmine
March 18	Antalya, Turkey; Clay; M15; Singles and doubles draws	(Romania) Filip Cristian Jianu; 6–1, 6–2	(Austria) Joel Schwärzler	(Italy) Mariano Tammaro (Romania) Sebastian Gima	(Romania) Bogdan Pavel (France) Louis Tessa (Germany) Justin Engel (Italy) Marco Miceli
March 18	Antalya, Turkey; Clay; M15; Singles and doubles draws	(Czech Republic) Jan Hrazdil (Czech Republic) Václav Šafránek; 7–6^{(7–4)}, 1–6, [10–7]	(Germany) John Sperle (Germany) Marlon Vankan	(Italy) Mariano Tammaro (Romania) Sebastian Gima	(Romania) Bogdan Pavel (France) Louis Tessa (Germany) Justin Engel (Italy) Marco Miceli
March 18	Punta del Este, Uruguay; Clay; M15; Singles and doubles draws	(Argentina) Lautaro Midón; 1–6, 7–5, 6–2	(Argentina) Ezequiel Simonit	(Argentina) Franco Ribero (Argentina) Leonardo Aboian	(Argentina) Juan Manuel La Serna (Colombia) Alejandro Hoyos (Argentina) Lautaro Agustín Falabella (United States) Alexander Stater
March 18	Punta del Este, Uruguay; Clay; M15; Singles and doubles draws	(Argentina) Thiago Cigarrán (Switzerland) Nicolás Parizzia; 6–2, 3–6, [11–9]	(Argentina) Leonardo Aboian (Argentina) Santiago de la Fuente	(Argentina) Franco Ribero (Argentina) Leonardo Aboian	(Argentina) Juan Manuel La Serna (Colombia) Alejandro Hoyos (Argentina) Lautaro Agustín Falabella (United States) Alexander Stater
March 25	Saint-Dizier, France; Hard (i); M25; Singles and doubles draws	(Belgium) Gauthier Onclin; 3–6, 7–6^{(7–3)}, 7–5	Alibek Kachmazov	(Belgium) Raphaël Collignon (Belgium) Buvaysar Gadamauri	(Germany) Tim Handel (France) Alexis Gautier (Syria) Hazem Naw (France) Sascha Gueymard Wayenburg
March 25	Saint-Dizier, France; Hard (i); M25; Singles and doubles draws	(Germany) Tim Handel (Switzerland) Yannik Steinegger; 6–2, 6–3	(Germany) Daniel Masur; Alexey Vatutin	(Belgium) Raphaël Collignon (Belgium) Buvaysar Gadamauri	(Germany) Tim Handel (France) Alexis Gautier (Syria) Hazem Naw (France) Sascha Gueymard Wayenburg
March 25	Santa Margherita di Pula, Italy; Clay; M25; Singles and doubles draws	(France) Valentin Royer; 6–3, 6–3	(Croatia) Nino Serdarušić	(Italy) Marcello Serafini (Netherlands) Max Houkes	(Romania) Nicholas David Ionel (Turkey) Ergi Kırkın (Italy) Gabriele Pennaforti (Italy) Gabriele Piraino
March 25	Santa Margherita di Pula, Italy; Clay; M25; Singles and doubles draws	(Italy) Giuseppe Tresca (Italy) Augusto Virgili; 7–6^{(7–3)}, 6–1	(Italy) Giorgio Ricca (Italy) Marcello Serafini	(Italy) Marcello Serafini (Netherlands) Max Houkes	(Romania) Nicholas David Ionel (Turkey) Ergi Kırkın (Italy) Gabriele Pennaforti (Italy) Gabriele Piraino
March 25	Trnava, Slovakia; Hard (i); M25; Singles and doubles draws	(Czech Republic) Jakub Nicod; 6–3, 6–1	(Germany) Sebastian Fanselow	(Germany) Henri Squire (Germany) Max Hans Rehberg	(France) Robin Bertrand (Bosnia and Herzegovina) Mirza Bašić; Mikalai Haliak (Poland) Martyn Pawelski
March 25	Trnava, Slovakia; Hard (i); M25; Singles and doubles draws	(Austria) Neil Oberleitner (Switzerland) Jakub Paul; 7–5, 6–0	(Czech Republic) David Poljak (Czech Republic) Matěj Vocel	(Germany) Henri Squire (Germany) Max Hans Rehberg	(France) Robin Bertrand (Bosnia and Herzegovina) Mirza Bašić; Mikalai Haliak (Poland) Martyn Pawelski
March 25	Tarragona, Spain; Clay; M25; Singles and doubles draws	(Germany) Marko Topo; 6–3, 2–6, 6–2	(Peru) Ignacio Buse	(Spain) Daniel Mérida (Italy) Lorenzo Giustino	(Netherlands) Michiel de Krom (Czech Republic) Martin Krumich (Spain) Miguel Damas; Svyatoslav Gulin
March 25	Tarragona, Spain; Clay; M25; Singles and doubles draws	(Netherlands) Michiel de Krom (Netherlands) Ryan Nijboer; 7–6^{(7–5)}, 6–4	(Argentina) Hernán Casanova (Switzerland) Damien Wenger	(Spain) Daniel Mérida (Italy) Lorenzo Giustino	(Netherlands) Michiel de Krom (Czech Republic) Martin Krumich (Spain) Miguel Damas; Svyatoslav Gulin
March 25	Bragado, Argentina; Clay; M15; Singles and doubles draws	(Argentina) Lautaro Midón; 7–6^{(7–4)}, 6–1	(Argentina) Luciano Emanuel Ambrogi	(Argentina) Tomás Farjat (Argentina) Ignacio Monzón	(Argentina) Valerio Aboian (Argentina) Sean Hess (Argentina) Juan Bautista Otegui (Italy) Luciano Carraro
March 25	Bragado, Argentina; Clay; M15; Singles and doubles draws	(Argentina) Mateo del Pino (Argentina) Juan Manuel La Serna; 6–7^{(4–7)}, 6–2, [10–5]	(Argentina) Alejo Lorenzo Lingua Lavallén (Argentina) Fermín Tenti	(Argentina) Tomás Farjat (Argentina) Ignacio Monzón	(Argentina) Valerio Aboian (Argentina) Sean Hess (Argentina) Juan Bautista Otegui (Italy) Luciano Carraro
March 25	Sharm El Sheikh, Egypt; Hard; M15; Singles and doubles draws	(United Kingdom) Giles Hussey; 6–2, 6–4	(Ukraine) Vadym Ursu	(Egypt) Amr Elsayed (Czech Republic) Marek Gengel	(Italy) Alexandr Binda (Turkey) Koray Kırcı (Italy) Lorenzo Lorusso (United Kingdom) Millen Hurrion
March 25	Sharm El Sheikh, Egypt; Hard; M15; Singles and doubles draws	(United Kingdom) George Houghton (United Kingdom) Daniel Little; 7–5, 5–7, [10–6]	(Italy) Alexandr Binda; Evgeny Philippov	(Egypt) Amr Elsayed (Czech Republic) Marek Gengel	(Italy) Alexandr Binda (Turkey) Koray Kırcı (Italy) Lorenzo Lorusso (United Kingdom) Millen Hurrion
March 25	Heraklion, Greece; Hard; M15; Singles and doubles draws	(Australia) Jacob Bradshaw; 7–6^{(7–3)}, 6–1	(Lithuania) Edas Butvilas	(Japan) Ryuki Matsuda (Slovakia) Martin Kližan	(Greece) Ioannis Xilas (Greece) Demetris Azoides (Georgia (country)) Aleksandre Bakshi (Poland) Filip Peliwo
March 25	Heraklion, Greece; Hard; M15; Singles and doubles draws	(Greece) Christos Antonopoulos (Cyprus) Eleftherios Neos; 6–4, 6–3	(Japan) Ryuki Matsuda (United Kingdom) Harry Wendelken	(Japan) Ryuki Matsuda (Slovakia) Martin Kližan	(Greece) Ioannis Xilas (Greece) Demetris Azoides (Georgia (country)) Aleksandre Bakshi (Poland) Filip Peliwo
March 25	Tsukuba, Japan; Hard; M15; Singles and doubles draws	(Japan) Hikaru Shiraishi; 6–1, 6–3	(Japan) Kokoro Isomura	(China) Zhou Yi (Japan) Ryotaro Matsumura	(South Korea) Chung Yun-seong (South Korea) Lee Jea-moon (South Korea) Shin San-hui (Greece) Stefanos Sakellaridis
March 25	Tsukuba, Japan; Hard; M15; Singles and doubles draws	(Japan) Yusuke Kusuhara (Japan) Shunsuke Nakagawa; 7–5, 7–6^{(7–4)}	(Chinese Taipei) Ray Ho (South Korea) Nam Ji-sung	(China) Zhou Yi (Japan) Ryotaro Matsumura	(South Korea) Chung Yun-seong (South Korea) Lee Jea-moon (South Korea) Shin San-hui (Greece) Stefanos Sakellaridis
March 25	Monastir, Tunisia; Hard; M15; Singles and doubles draws	(France) Constantin Bittoun Kouzmine; 6–2, 6–3	(France) Alexandre Aubriot	(United States) Tauheed Browning (France) Cyril Vandermeersch	(France) Sven Corbinais (Belgium) Nicolas Ifi (Italy) Massimo Giunta (Belgium) Simon Beaupain
March 25	Monastir, Tunisia; Hard; M15; Singles and doubles draws	(France) Luc Fomba (United Kingdom) Ewen Lumsden; 5–7, 7–6^{(7–2)}, [13–11]	(United States) Jordan Chiu (Netherlands) Daniel de Jonge	(United States) Tauheed Browning (France) Cyril Vandermeersch	(France) Sven Corbinais (Belgium) Nicolas Ifi (Italy) Massimo Giunta (Belgium) Simon Beaupain
March 25	Antalya, Turkey; Clay; M15; Singles and doubles draws	(Norway) Nicolai Budkov Kjær; 6–4, 6–3	(Netherlands) Niels Visker	(Netherlands) Stijn Slump (Finland) Eero Vasa	(Czech Republic) Jiří Barnat (Turkey) Atakan Karahan; Evgenii Tiurnev (Netherlands) Deney Wassermann
March 25	Antalya, Turkey; Clay; M15; Singles and doubles draws	(Czech Republic) Jiří Barnat (Poland) Jasza Szajrych; 4–6, 6–3, [10–4]	(Romania) Ioan Alexandru Chiriță (Romania) Alexandru Jecan	(Netherlands) Stijn Slump (Finland) Eero Vasa	(Czech Republic) Jiří Barnat (Turkey) Atakan Karahan; Evgenii Tiurnev (Netherlands) Deney Wassermann
