= 2026 Shanghai Challenger – Singles =

Singles
- 2026 Shanghai Challenger

Final
- Champion: Ilya Ivashka
- Runner-up: Marat Sharipov
- Score: 6–4, 3–6, 7–6^{(9–7)}

Events
Singles	Doubles
- Shanghai Challenger

Giulio Zeppieri was the defending champion but chose not to defend his title.

Ilya Ivashka won the title after defeating Marat Sharipov 6–4, 3–6, 7–6^{(9–7)} in the final.

== Seeds ==
1. (Japan) Rei Sakamoto (first round)
2. (Japan) Taro Daniel (second round)
3. (Australia) Bernard Tomic (second round)
4. (Canada) Alexis Galarneau (quarterfinals)
5. (Sweden) Elias Ymer (first round)
6. (Japan) Rio Noguchi (second round)
7. (Chinese Taipei) Tseng Chun-hsin (first round)
8. (China) Zhou Yi (quarterfinals)

== Draw ==
Key

- Q = Qualifier
- WC = Wild card
- LL = Lucky loser
- Alt = Alternate
- ITF = ITF entry
- PR = Protected ranking
- SR = Special ranking
- SE = Special exempt
- JE = Junior exempt
- JR = Junior Accelerator Programme entrant
- CO = College Accelerator Programme entrant
- NG = Next Gen Accelerator Program entrant
- w/o = Walkover
- r = Retired
- d = Defaulted

=== Finals ===
Semifinals
Q	(Switzerland) Luca Castelnuovo	3	4
Ilya Ivashka	6	6
Pavel Kotov	3	5
Marat Sharipov	6	7

Final
Ilya Ivashka	6	3	7^{9}
Marat Sharipov	4	6	6^{7}

=== Top half ===
First round
1	(Japan) R Sakamoto	6^{3}	4
Q	(South Korea) J-s Nam	7^{7}	6
P Bar Biryukov	6^{6}	7^{7}	2
Q	(Kazakhstan) D Yevseyev	7^{8}	6^{1}	6
Q	(Italy) A Binda	6^{4}	2
(Chinese Taipei) T-l Wu	7^{7}	6
Q	(Switzerland) L Castelnuovo	3	7^{9}	6
7	(Chinese Taipei) C-h Tseng	6	6^{7}	2
3	(Australia) B Tomic	6	6
(Japan) A Santillan	4	4
I Ivashka	6	6
(Chinese Taipei) Y-h Hsu	3	3
WC	(China) J Cui	7	6
(China) F Sun	5	4
(Uzbekistan) S Fomin	6^{1}	5
8	(China) Y Zhou	7^{7}	7

Second round
Q	(South Korea) J-s Nam	6	6
Q	(Kazakhstan) D Yevseyev	2	2
(Chinese Taipei) T-l Wu	5	4
Q	(Switzerland) L Castelnuovo	7	6
3	(Australia) B Tomic	4	6	2
I Ivashka	6	4	6
WC	(China) J Cui	6^{3}	4
8	(China) Y Zhou	7^{7}	6

Quarterfinals
Q	(South Korea) J-s Nam	4	4
Q	(Switzerland) L Castelnuovo	6	6
I Ivashka	6	6
8	(China) Y Zhou	3	3

Semifinals
Q	(Switzerland) L Castelnuovo	3	4
I Ivashka	6	6

=== Bottom half ===
First round
5	(Sweden) E Ymer	6	3	6^{9}
P Kotov	3	6	7^{11}
(Japan) H Matsuoka	6	6^{5}	6^{6}
(Australia) Ja Delaney	2	7^{7}	7^{8}
WC	(China) Xiao Linang	6	7
(Japan) K Uchida	3	5
Alt	Semen Pankin	6^{5}	4
4	(Canada) A Galarneau	7^{7}	6
6	(Japan) R Noguchi	7^{7}	6
WC	(China) R Te	6^{5}	2
Q	(Australia) O Jasika	6	6
Q	(Malaysia) Mitsuki Wei Kang Leong	2	1
(Japan) Y Watanuki	7^{10}	5	2
M Sharipov	6^{8}	7	6
(Australia) Matthew Dellavedova	3	1
2	(Japan) T Daniel	6	6

Second round
P Kotov	7^{7}	7^{9}
(Australia) Ja Delaney	6^{5}	6^{7}
WC	(China) L Xiao	3	4
4	(Canada) A Galarneau	6	6
6	(Japan) R Noguchi	2	5
Q	(Australia) O Jasika	6	7
M Sharipov	7	7^{7}
2	(Japan) T Daniel	5	6^{5}

Quarterfinals
P Kotov	3	6	6
4	(Canada) A Galarneau	6	1	1
Q	(Australia) O Jasika	4	4
M Sharipov	6	6

Semifinals
P Kotov	3	5
M Sharipov	6	7
