= 2026 Bengaluru Open III – Doubles =

Doubles
- 2026 Bengaluru Open III

Final
- Champions: (India) Adil Kalyanpur (India) Mukund Sasikumar
- Runners-up: Petr Bar Biryukov (Kazakhstan) Grigoriy Lomakin
- Score: 6–7^{(3–7)}, 6–4, [10–3]

Events
Singles	Doubles
- Bengaluru Open

Niki Kaliyanda Poonacha and Saketh Myneni were the defending champions but lost in the semifinals to Petr Bar Biryukov and Grigoriy Lomakin.

Adil Kalyanpur and Mukund Sasikumar won the title after defeating Bar Biryukov and Lomakin 6–7^{(3–7)}, 6–4, [10–3] in the final.

== Seeds ==
1. (India) S D Prajwal Dev / (India) Nitin Kumar Sinha (first round)
2. (Republic of Ireland) Charles Barry / (Australia) Joshua Charlton (semifinals)
3. Sergey Betov / (India) Jeevan Nedunchezhiyan (first round)
4. (Japan) Kokoro Isomura / (Japan) Ryuki Matsuda (quarterfinals)

== Draw ==
Key

- Q = Qualifier
- WC = Wild card
- LL = Lucky loser
- Alt = Alternate
- ITF = ITF entry
- PR = Protected ranking
- SR = Special ranking
- SE = Special exempt
- JE = Junior exempt
- JR = Junior Accelerator Programme entrant
- CO = College Accelerator Programme entrant
- NG = Next Gen Accelerator Program entrant
- w/o = Walkover
- r = Retired
- d = Defaulted

First round
1	(India) SDP Dev (India) Nitin Kumar Sinha	3	2
(Japan) Tomohiro Masabayashi (Japan) Leo Vithoontien	6	6
(Philippines) FC Alcantara (Thailand) M Jones	2	3
(India) N Kaliyanda Poonacha (India) S Myneni	6	6
3	S Betov (India) J Nedunchezhiyan	5	3
P Bar Biryukov (Kazakhstan) G Lomakin	7	6
(United Kingdom) A Gray (United Kingdom) H Stewart	4^{r}
(Mexico) A Hernández (Japan) Takuya Kumasaka	3
Alt	(Czech Republic) D Palán (India) Digvijaypratap Singh	3	5
(India) A Kalyanpur (India) M Sasikumar	6	7
WC	(India) Parth Aggarwal (India) Aradhya Kshitij	2	2
4	(Japan) K Isomura (Japan) Ryuki Matsuda	6	6
(India) Sai Karteek Reddy Ganta (Japan) Yamato Sueoka	3	6^{4}
(Chinese Taipei) J Hsu (United States) C Papa	6	7^{7}
WC	(India) Rethin Pranav Senthil Kumar (India) Kriish Tyagi	6^{8}	7^{7}	[9]
2	(Republic of Ireland) C Barry (Australia) J Charlton	7^{10}	6^{5}	[11]

Quarterfinals
(Japan) T Masabayashi (Japan) L Vithoontien	6^{5}	4
(India) N Kaliyanda Poonacha (India) S Myneni	7^{7}	6
P Bar Biryukov (Kazakhstan) G Lomakin	4	6	[11]
(Mexico) A Hernández (Japan) T Kumasaka	6	3	[9]
(India) A Kalyanpur (India) M Sasikumar	6	7^{7}
4	(Japan) K Isomura (Japan) R Matsuda	3	6^{4}
(Chinese Taipei) J Hsu (United States) C Papa	5	5
2	(Republic of Ireland) C Barry (Australia) J Charlton	7	7

Semifinals
(India) N Kaliyanda Poonacha (India) S Myneni	3	4
P Bar Biryukov (Kazakhstan) G Lomakin	6	6
(India) A Kalyanpur (India) M Sasikumar	6	6
2	(Republic of Ireland) C Barry (Australia) J Charlton	4	3

Final
P Bar Biryukov (Kazakhstan) G Lomakin	7^{7}	4	[3]
(India) A Kalyanpur (India) M Sasikumar	6^{3}	6	[10]
