= Manama Challenger =

- 2025 Manama Challenger

ATP Challenger Tour
- Location: Manama, Bahrain
- Venue: Public Security Officers Club, Gudaibiya
- Category: ATP Challenger Tour
- Surface: Hard
- Prize money: $60,000

The Manama Challenger is a professional tennis tournament played on hardcourts. It is currently part of the ATP Challenger Tour. It was first held in Manama, Bahrain in November 2025.

== Past finals ==
=== Singles ===
Year	Champion	Runner-up	Score
2025	(United Kingdom) Toby Samuel	Ilia Simakin	6–0, 6–2

=== Doubles ===
Year	Champions	Runners-up	Score
2025	Petr Bar Biryukov (Italy) Alexandr Binda	Egor Agafonov; Ilia Simakin	7–5, 6–1
