= 2025 Manama Challenger – Doubles =

Doubles
- 2025 Manama Challenger

Final
- Champions: Petr Bar Biryukov (Italy) Alexandr Binda
- Runners-up: Egor Agafonov; Ilia Simakin
- Score: 7–5, 6–1

Events
| Singles | Doubles |
- Manama Challenger

This was the first edition of the tournament.

Petr Bar Biryukov and Alexandr Binda won the title after defeating Egor Agafonov and Ilia Simakin 7–5, 6–1 in the final.

== Seeds ==
1. (Finland) Patrik Niklas-Salminen / (Finland) Eero Vasa (semifinals)
2. (India) Adil Kalyanpur / (Tunisia) Aziz Ouakaa (quarterfinals)
3. Daniil Golubev / (Poland) Szymon Walków (first round)
4. (Spain) Iván Marrero Curbelo / (Canada) Kelsey Stevenson (quarterfinals)

== Draw ==
Key

- Q = Qualifier
- WC = Wild card
- LL = Lucky loser
- Alt = Alternate
- ITF = ITF entry
- PR = Protected ranking
- SR = Special ranking
- SE = Special exempt
- JE = Junior exempt
- JR = Junior Accelerator Programme entrant
- CO = College Accelerator Programme entrant
- NG = Next Gen Accelerator Program entrant
- w/o = Walkover
- r = Retired
- d = Defaulted

First round
1 | (Finland) P Niklas-Salminen (Finland) E Vasa | 6 | 7^{8}
Semen Pankin (Greece) Ioannis Xilas | 4 | 6^{6}
(United Kingdom) B Jones (United Kingdom) M Summers | 6 | 6
WC | (Kuwait) Essa Qabazard (Bahrain) Y Qaed | 4 | 4
4 | (Spain) Iván Marrero Curbelo (Canada) K Stevenson | 3 | 6 | [10]
Alt | I Nedelko (United States) Michael Zhu | 6 | 3 | [6]
Alt | (Egypt) Michael Bassem Sobhy (Egypt) Fares Zakaria | 3 | 2
P Bar Biryukov (Italy) A Binda | 6 | 6
(France) M Bobichon (Algeria) Samir Hamza Reguig | 4 | 3
(Bosnia and Herzegovina) M Bašić; S Betov | 6 | 6
(Germany) Maximilian Homberg (United States) Oren Vasser | 6 | 7^{8}
3 | D Golubev (Poland) S Walków | 3 | 6^{6}
(Romania) Vladislav Melnic (Northern Mariana Islands) C Sinclair | 3 | 7^{7} | [9]
2 | (India) A Kalyanpur (Tunisia) A Ouakaa | 6 | 6^{4} | [11]

Quarterfinals
1 | (Finland) P Niklas-Salminen (Finland) E Vasa | 3 | 7^{7} | [10]
(United Kingdom) B Jones (United Kingdom) M Summers | 6 | 6^{5} | [8]
4 | (Spain) I Marrero Curbelo (Canada) K Stevenson | 3 | 4
P Bar Biryukov (Italy) A Binda | 6 | 6
(Bosnia and Herzegovina) M Bašić; S Betov | 5 | 5
(Germany) M Homberg (United States) O Vasser | 7 | 7
E Agafonov; I Simakin | 7^{7} | 7^{7}
2 | (India) A Kalyanpur (Tunisia) A Ouakaa | 6^{5} | 6^{4}

Semifinals
1 | (Finland) P Niklas-Salminen (Finland) E Vasa | 3 | 4
P Bar Biryukov (Italy) A Binda | 6 | 6
(Germany) M Homberg (United States) O Vasser | 3 | 6 | [8]
E Agafonov; I Simakin | 6 | 4 | [10]

Final
P Bar Biryukov (Italy) A Binda | 7 | 6
E Agafonov; I Simakin | 5 | 1
