= 2025 Manama Challenger =

- Date: 24 – 30 November
- Edition: 1st
- Surface: Hard
- Location: Manama, Bahrain

Champions

Singles
- (United Kingdom) Toby Samuel

Doubles
- Petr Bar Biryukov / (Italy) Alexandr Binda
- Manama Challenger

The 2025 Manama Challenger was a professional tennis tournament played on hardcourts. It was the first edition of the tournament which was part of the 2025 ATP Challenger Tour. It took place in Manama, Bahrain between 24 and 30 November 2025.

== Singles main-draw entrants ==
=== Seeds ===
Country	Player	Rank^{1}	Seed
~~BEL~~	~~Kimmer Coppejans~~	~~223~~	~~1~~
	Ilia Simakin	277	2
	Petr Bar Biryukov	315	3
FRA	Mathys Erhard	316	4
~~CRO~~	~~Duje Ajduković~~	~~321~~	~~5~~
CZE	Petr Brunclík	331	6
~~NED~~	~~Jelle Sels~~	~~352~~	~~7~~
UZB	Sergey Fomin	405	8
ITA	Alexandr Binda	434	9

- ^{1} Rankings are as of 17 November 2025.

=== Other entrants ===
The following players received wildcards into the singles main draw:

- (Republic of Ireland) Cian Maguire
- (Romania) Vladislav Melnic
- (Australia) ~~Benjamin O'Connell~~

The following player received entry into the singles main draw using a protected ranking:

- (Syria) Hazem Naw

The following player received entry into the singles main draw through the Junior Accelerator programme:

- (Poland) Tomasz Berkieta

The following players received entry into the singles main draw as alternates:

- (Ukraine) Yurii Dzhavakian
- (Germany) Nino Ehrenschneider

The following players received entry from the qualifying draw:

- (France) Matisse Bobichon
- (Germany) Maximilian Homberg
- (Spain) Iván Marrero Curbelo
- (Finland) Patrik Niklas-Salminen
- (Tunisia) Aziz Ouakaa
- Semen Pankin

The following players received entry as lucky losers:

- (Czech Republic) Dominik Kellovský
- (Northern Mariana Islands) Colin Sinclair
- (United Kingdom) Matthew Summers

== Champions ==
=== Singles ===
- (United Kingdom) Toby Samuel def. Ilia Simakin 6–0, 6–2.

=== Doubles ===
- Petr Bar Biryukov / (Italy) Alexandr Binda def. Egor Agafonov / Ilia Simakin 7–5, 6–1.
