= 2026 Bengaluru Open III – Singles =

Singles
- 2026 Bengaluru Open III

Final
- Champion: Petr Bar Biryukov
- Runner-up: Ilya Ivashka
- Score: 7–6^{(7–0)}, 4–6, 6–4

Events
| Singles | Doubles |
- Bengaluru Open

Keegan Smith was the defending champion but lost in the first round to Manish Sureshkumar.

Petr Bar Biryukov won the title after defeating Ilya Ivashka 7–6^{(7–0)}, 4–6, 6–4 in the final.

== Seeds ==
1. (United States) Keegan Smith (first round)
2. (United Kingdom) Alastair Gray (semifinals)
3. (United Kingdom) Hamish Stewart (semifinals)
4. Petr Bar Biryukov (champion)
5. (Australia) Philip Sekulic (withdrew)
6. (Serbia) Ognjen Milić (quarterfinals)
7. (India) Karan Singh (first round)
8. (Thailand) Maximus Jones (first round)

== Draw ==
Key

- Q = Qualifier
- WC = Wild card
- LL = Lucky loser
- Alt = Alternate
- ITF = ITF entry
- PR = Protected ranking
- SR = Special ranking
- SE = Special exempt
- JE = Junior exempt
- JR = Junior Accelerator Programme entrant
- CO = College Accelerator Programme entrant
- NG = Next Gen Accelerator Program entrant
- w/o = Walkover
- r = Retired
- d = Defaulted

=== Finals ===
Semifinals
Ilya Ivashka | 6 | 3 | 6
3 | (United Kingdom) Hamish Stewart | 3 | 6 | 2
4 | Petr Bar Biryukov | 3 | 6 | 7^{7}
2 | (United Kingdom) Alastair Gray | 6 | 4 | 6^{5}

Final
Ilya Ivashka | 6^{0} | 6 | 4
4 | Petr Bar Biryukov | 7^{7} | 4 | 6

=== Top half ===
First round
1 | (United States) K Smith | 4 | 6 | 2
WC | (India) Manish Sureshkumar | 6 | 2 | 6
(India) SDP Dev | 3 | 2
I Ivashka | 6 | 6
Q | (Kazakhstan) G Lomakin | 4 | 6^{6}
(Mexico) A Hernández | 6 | 7^{8}
Q | (Japan) Naoya Honda | 6 | 6
LL | (India) Nitin Kumar Sinha | 4 | 1
3 | (United Kingdom) H Stewart | 6 | 6^{2} | 6
WC | (India) Aditya Vishal Balsekar | 4 | 7^{7} | 4
(Chinese Taipei) K-y Lee | 6^{8} | 6^{4}
WC | (India) Kriish Tyagi | 7^{10} | 7^{7}
(Australia) O Jasika | 6^{4} | 2
(India) Sidharth Rawat | 7^{7} | 6
Q | (Thailand) Thanapet Chanta | 4 | 4
6 | (Serbia) O Milić | 6 | 6

Second round
WC | (India) M Sureshkumar | 1 | 1
I Ivashka | 6 | 6
(Mexico) A Hernández | 5 | 7 | 6
Q | (Japan) N Honda | 7 | 5 | 4
3 | (United Kingdom) H Stewart | 4 | 6 | 6
WC | (India) K Tyagi | 6 | 4 | 3
(India) S Rawat | 3 | 1
6 | (Serbia) O Milić | 6 | 6

Quarterfinals
I Ivashka | 6 | 6
(Mexico) A Hernández | 1 | 2
3 | (United Kingdom) H Stewart | 6 | 6
6 | (Serbia) O Milić | 2 | 1

Semifinals
I Ivashka | 6 | 3 | 6
3 | (United Kingdom) H Stewart | 3 | 6 | 2

=== Bottom half ===
First round
7 | (India) K Singh | 7 | 3 | 2
(Malaysia) Mitsuki Wei Kang Leong | 5 | 6 | 6
(Japan) Ryuki Matsuda | 4 | 2
(Japan) Y Takahashi | 6 | 6
(India) Digvijaypratap Singh | 3 | 4
(Japan) Leo Vithoontien | 6 | 6
Q | (United States) C Papa | 2 | 2
4 | P Bar Biryukov | 6 | 6
8 | (Thailand) M Jones | 6^{5} | 6^{5}
(India) M Sasikumar | 7^{7} | 7^{7}
(Japan) Takuya Kumasaka | 6^{4} | 6 | 6^{5}
Q | (Japan) Taiyo Yamanaka | 7^{7} | 4 | 7^{7}
(Czech Republic) D Palán | 6 | 3 | 6
(Japan) K Isomura | 4 | 6 | 3
Q | (India) Aradhya Kshitij | 1 | 2
2 | (United Kingdom) A Gray | 6 | 6

Second round
(Malaysia) MWK Leong | 6 | 6
(Japan) Y Takahashi | 3 | 2
(Japan) L Vithoontien | 6^{2} | 4
4 | P Bar Biryukov | 7^{7} | 6
(India) M Sasikumar | 6 | 7^{7}
Q | (Japan) T Yamanaka | 4 | 6^{1}
(Czech Republic) D Palán | 3 | 6^{2}
2 | (United Kingdom) A Gray | 6 | 7^{7}

Quarterfinals
(Malaysia) MWK Leong | 2 | 7 | 3
4 | P Bar Biryukov | 6 | 5 | 6
(India) M Sasikumar | 2 | 7 | 6^{3}
2 | (United Kingdom) A Gray | 6 | 5 | 7^{7}

Semifinals
4 | P Bar Biryukov | 3 | 6 | 7^{7}
2 | (United Kingdom) A Gray | 6 | 4 | 6^{5}
