= 2026 Shanghai Challenger – Doubles =

Doubles
- 2026 Shanghai Challenger

Final
- Champions: (Australia) Jake Delaney (Australia) Jesse Delaney
- Runners-up: Petr Bar Biryukov (Italy) Alexander Binda
- Score: 6–4, 7–6^{(7–2)}

Events
Singles	Doubles
- Shanghai Challenger

Pruchya Isaro and Niki Kaliyanda Poonacha were the defending champions but only Isaro chose to defend his title, partnering Hsieh Cheng-peng. They lost in the first round to Ray Ho and Reese Stalder.

Jake and Jesse Delaney won the title after defeating Petr Bar Biryukov and Alexander Binda 6–4, 7–6^{(7–2)} in the final.

== Seeds ==
1. (Chinese Taipei) Ray Ho / (United States) Reese Stalder (semifinals)
2. (Netherlands) Thijmen Loof / (Japan) Kaito Uesugi (first round)
3. (Australia) Blake Bayldon / (Australia) Joshua Charlton (quarterfinals)
4. (Chinese Taipei) Huang Tsung-hao / (India) Arjun Kadhe (first round)

== Draw ==
Key

- Q = Qualifier
- WC = Wild card
- LL = Lucky loser
- Alt = Alternate
- ITF = ITF entry
- PR = Protected ranking
- SR = Special ranking
- SE = Special exempt
- JE = Junior exempt
- JR = Junior Accelerator Programme entrant
- CO = College Accelerator Programme entrant
- NG = Next Gen Accelerator Program entrant
- w/o = Walkover
- r = Retired
- d = Defaulted

First round
1	(Chinese Taipei) R Ho (United States) R Stalder	2	6	[10]
(Chinese Taipei) C-p Hsieh (Thailand) P Isaro	6	3	[8]
(Chinese Taipei) Y-h Hsu (China) F Sun	3	6	[9]
Semen Pankin (Sweden) E Ymer	6	3	[11]
4	(Chinese Taipei) T-h Huang (India) A Kadhe	6^{5}	4
P Bar Biryukov (Italy) A Binda	7^{7}	6
(Australia) O Jasika (Australia) B Tomic	4	0
(Japan) R Noguchi (China) A Wang	6	6
WC	(China) Xiao Linang (China) Zeng Yaojie	6^{5}	7	[8]
(Australia) Ja Delaney (Australia) Je Delaney	7^{7}	5	[10]
(Canada) A Galarneau (Antigua and Barbuda) J Maginley	6^{6}	6	[11]
3	(Australia) B Bayldon (Australia) J Charlton	7^{8}	4	[13]
WC	(China) J Cui (China) R Te	2	5
(Japan) K Uchida (Japan) T Yuzuki	6	7
(South Korea) J-s Nam (South Korea) U-s Park	2	7^{7}	[10]
2	(Netherlands) T Loof (Japan) K Uesugi	6	6^{2}	[7]

Quarterfinals
1	(Chinese Taipei) R Ho (United States) R Stalder	7^{7}	6
S Pankin (Sweden) E Ymer	6^{5}	2
P Bar Biryukov (Italy) A Binda	4	7	[10]
(Japan) R Noguchi (China) A Wang	6	5	[3]
(Australia) Ja Delaney (Australia) Je Delaney	6	6
3	(Australia) B Bayldon (Australia) J Charlton	1	3
(Japan) K Uchida (Japan) T Yuzuki	6^{4}	4
(South Korea) J-s Nam (South Korea) U-s Park	7^{7}	6

Semifinals
1	(Chinese Taipei) R Ho (United States) R Stalder	6	3	[5]
P Bar Biryukov (Italy) A Binda	3	6	[10]
(Australia) Ja Delaney (Australia) Je Delaney	6	6
(South Korea) J-s Nam (South Korea) U-s Park	4	2

Final
P Bar Biryukov (Italy) A Binda	4	6^{2}
(Australia) Ja Delaney (Australia) Je Delaney	6	7^{7}
