= 2026 Bengaluru Open III =

- Date: 18 – 23 May
- Edition: 12th
- Surface: Hard
- Location: Bangalore, India

Champions

Singles
- Petr Bar Biryukov

Doubles
- (India) Adil Kalyanpur / (India) Mukund Sasikumar
- Bengaluru Open

The 2026 Bengaluru Open III was a professional tennis tournament played on hard courts. It was the 12th edition of the tournament which was part of the 2026 ATP Challenger Tour. It took place in Bangalore, India from 18 to 23 May 2026.

== Singles main-draw entrants ==
=== Seeds ===
Country	Player	Rank^{1}	Seed
USA	Keegan Smith	289	1
GBR	Alastair Gray	293	2
GBR	Hamish Stewart	328	3
	Petr Bar Biryukov	337	4
~~AUS~~	~~Philip Sekulic~~	~~357~~	~~5~~
SRB	Ognjen Milić	395	6
IND	Karan Singh	413	7
THA	Maximus Jones	442	8

- ^{1} Rankings are as of 4 May 2026.

=== Other entrants ===
The following players received wildcards into the singles main draw:

- (India) Manish Sureshkumar
- (India) Kriish Tyagi
- (India) Aditya Vishal Balsekar

The following players received entry from the qualifying draw:

- (Thailand) Thanapet Chanta
- (Japan) Naoya Honda
- (India) Aradhya Kshitij
- (Kazakhstan) Grigoriy Lomakin
- (United States) Christopher Papa
- (Japan) Taiyo Yamanaka

The following player received entry as a lucky loser:

- (India) Nitin Kumar Sinha

== Champions ==
=== Singles ===
- Petr Bar Biryukov def. Ilya Ivashka 7–6^{(7–0)}, 4–6, 6–4.

=== Doubles ===
- (India) Adil Kalyanpur / (India) Mukund Sasikumar def. Petr Bar Biryukov / (Kazakhstan) Grigoriy Lomakin 6–7^{(3–7)}, 6–4, [10–3].
