= Egor Agafonov =

Russian tennis player (born 2002)

- Country (sports): Russia
- Born: 5 September 2002 (age 24) Tula, Russia
- Height: 1.85 m (6 ft 1 in)
- Plays: Right-handed (two-handed backhand)
- Coach: Vladimir Valchkov
- Prize money: US $82,560

Singles
- Career record: 0–0
- Career titles: 0
- Highest ranking: No. 465 (17 March 2025)
- Current ranking: No. 1,021 (19 October 2026)

Doubles
- Career record: 0–0
- Career titles: 0; 1 Challenger
- Highest ranking: No. 238 (10 February 2025)
- Current ranking: No. 477 (19 October 2026)
Medal record
Representing Individual Neutral Athletes
World University Games
Gold medal – first place	2025 Rhine-Ruhr	Doubles
- Last updated on: 19 October 2026.

Egor Agafonov (born 5 September 2002) is a Russian professional tennis player. He has a career-high ATP singles ranking of No. 465 achieved on 17 March 2025 and a best doubles ranking of No. 238 achieved on 10 February 2025.

Agafonov plays mostly on ATP Challenger Tour, where he has won one doubles title at the 2024 President's Cup, with countryman Ilia Simakin.

== ATP Challenger Tour Finals ==
=== Doubles: 2 (1 title, 1 runner-up) ===
Legend ATP Challenger Tour (1–1)

Result	W–L	Date	Tournament	Tier	Surface	Partner	Opponents	Score
Win	1–0	Jul 2024	President's Cup, Kazakhstan	Challenger	Hard	Ilia Simakin	(Uzbekistan) Denis Istomin; Evgeny Karlovskiy	6–4, 6–3
Loss	1–1	Nov 2025	Manama Challenger, Bahrain	Challenger	Hard	Ilia Simakin	Petr Bar Biryukov (Italy) Alexandr Binda	5–7, 1–6
