= Alexander Binda =

Italian tennis player (born 2001)

- Country (sports): Russia (–2023); Italy (2023–)
- Born: 22 September 2001 (age 25) Lecco, Italy
- Height: 1.80 m (5 ft 11 in)
- Plays: Right-handed (two-handed backhand)
- Coach: Jens Brauwers
- Prize money: US $103,461

Singles
- Career record: 0–0
- Career titles: 0
- Highest ranking: No. 368 (4 August 2025)
- Current ranking: No. 465 (19 October 2026)

Doubles
- Career record: 0–0
- Career titles: 0; 1 Challenger
- Highest ranking: No. 314 (6 April 2026)
- Current ranking: No. 329 (19 October 2026)
- Last updated on: 19 October 2026.

Alexander Binda (born 22 September 2001) is an Italian professional tennis player. He has a career-high ATP singles ranking of No. 368 achieved on 4 August 2025 and a best doubles ranking of No. 314 achieved on 6 April 2026.

== Career ==
Binda plays mostly on ATP Challenger Tour, where he has won one doubles title at 2025 Manama Challenger, partnering with Petr Bar Biryukov.

== ATP Challenger Tour finals ==
=== Singles: 1 (runner-up) ===
Legend ATP Challenger Tour (0–1)

Result	W–L	Date	Tournament	Tier	Surface	Opponent	Score
Loss	0–1	Jul 2025	President's Cup, Kazakhstan	Challenger	Hard	(Norway) Nicolai Budkov Kjær	4–6, 3–6

=== Doubles: 3 (1 title, 2 runner-ups) ===
Legend ATP Challenger Tour (1–2)

Result	W–L	Date	Tournament	Tier	Surface	Partner	Opponents	Score
Loss	0–1	Aug 2025	Zhangjiagang Challenger, China	Challenger	Hard	Petr Bar Biryukov	(Switzerland) Luca Castelnuovo (Australia) Akira Santillan	3–6, 7–6^{(10–8)}, [3–10]
Win	1–1	Nov 2025	Manama Challenger, Bahrain	Challenger	Hard	Petr Bar Biryukov	Egor Agafonov; Ilia Simakin	7–5, 6–1
Loss	1–2	Sep 2026	Shanghai Challenger, China	Challenger	Hard	Petr Bar Biryukov	(Australia) Jake Delaney (Australia) Jesse Delaney	4–6, 6–7^{(2–7)}
