= Petr Bar Biryukov =

Russian tennis player (born 2002)

- Country (sports): Russia
- Born: 28 February 2002 (age 24) Saint Petersburg, Russia
- Height: 1.96 m (6 ft 5 in)
- Plays: Left-handed (two-handed backhand)
- Prize money: US $174,620

Singles
- Career record: 0–0
- Career titles: 0; 1 Challenger
- Highest ranking: No. 267 (27 October 2025)
- Current ranking: No. 272 (16 November 2026)

Doubles
- Career record: 0–1
- Career titles: 0; 1 Challenger
- Highest ranking: No. 227 (26 October 2026)
- Current ranking: No. 236 (16 November 2026)
- Last updated on: 26 November 2026.

Petr Bar Biryukov (born 28 February 2002) is a Russian professional tennis player. He has a career-high ATP singles ranking of No. 267 achieved on 27 October 2025 and a best doubles ranking of No. 227 achieved on 26 October 2026. Bar Biryukov plays mostly on ATP Challenger Tour, where he has won one singles and one doubles titles.

== Career ==
He won his first singles title at the 2026 Bengaluru Open III, and his first doubles title at the 2025 Manama Challenger, partnering with Alexander Binda.

== ATP Challenger Tour finals ==
=== Singles: 2 (1 title, 1 runner-up) ===
Legend ATP Challenger Tour (1–1)

Result	W–L	Date	Tournament	Tier	Surface	Opponent	Score
Win	1–0	May 2026	Bengaluru Open III, India	Challenger	Clay	Ilya Ivashka	7–6^{(7–0)}, 4–6, 6–4
Loss	1–1	Oct 2026	Ningbo Challenger, China	Challenger	Hard	Yaroslav Demin	5–7, 6–2, 6–7^{(6–8)}

=== Doubles: 5 (1 title, 4 runner-up) ===
Legend ATP Challenger Tour (1–4)

Result	W–L	Date	Tournament	Tier	Surface	Partner	Opponents	Score
Loss	0–1	Aug 2025	Zhangjiagang Challenger, China	Challenger	Hard	(Italy) Alexander Binda	(Switzerland) Luca Castelnuovo (Australia) Akira Santillan	3–6, 7–6^{(10–8)}, [3–10]
Win	1–1	Nov 2025	Manama Challenger, Bahrain	Challenger	Hard	(Italy) Alexander Binda	Egor Agafonov; Ilia Simakin	7–5, 6–1
Loss	1–2	May 2026	Bengaluru Open II, India	Challenger	Hard	(Kazakhstan) Grigoriy Lomakin	(India) Niki Kaliyanda Poonacha (India) Saketh Myneni	2–6, 3–6
Loss	1–3	Aug 2026	President's Cup, Kazakhstan	Challenger	Hard	(Kazakhstan) Grigoriy Lomakin	(Japan) Taisei Ichikawa (Japan) Masamichi Imamura	6–3, 6–7^{(4–7)}, [5–10]
Loss	1–4	Sep 2026	Shanghai Challenger, China	Challenger	Hard	(Italy) Alexander Binda	(Australia) Jake Delaney (Australia) Jesse Delaney	4–6, 6–7^{(2–7)}
