= 2024 Tenerife Challenger II – Singles =

Singles
- 2024 Tenerife Challenger II

Final
- Champion: (Italy) Matteo Gigante
- Runner-up: (Italy) Stefano Travaglia
- Score: 6–2, 6–4

Events
Singles	Doubles
← 2024 ·	Tenerife Challenger	· 2024 →

Brandon Nakashima was the defending champion but chose not to defend his title.

Matteo Gigante won the title after defeating Stefano Travaglia 6–2, 6–4 in the final.

== Seeds ==
1. (Hungary) Zsombor Piros (first round)
2. (Netherlands) Jesper de Jong (second round)
3. (Spain) Pablo Llamas Ruiz (first round)
4. (Austria) Filip Misolic (first round)
5. (Italy) Matteo Gigante (champion)
6. Ilya Ivashka (withdrew)
7. (Argentina) Santiago Rodríguez Taverna (second round)
8. (Italy) Franco Agamenone (second round)

== Draw ==
=== Key ===
- Q = Qualifier
- WC = Wild card
- LL = Lucky loser
- Alt = Alternate
- SE = Special exempt
- PR = Protected ranking
- ITF = ITF entry
- JE = Junior exempt
- w/o = Walkover
- r = Retired
- d = Defaulted
- SR = Special ranking

=== Finals ===
Semifinals
(France) Jules Marie	2	3
(Italy) Stefano Travaglia	6	6
(Italy) Francesco Maestrelli	0	4
5	(Italy) Matteo Gigante	6	6

Final
(Italy) Stefano Travaglia	2	4
5	(Italy) Matteo Gigante	6	6

=== Top half ===
First round
1	(Hungary) Z Piros	6^{2}	1
(France) Jules Marie	7^{7}	6
(Canada) A Galarneau	6	5	4
(Austria) D Novak	3	7	6
Alt	(Portugal) H Rocha	3	7^{7}	6
(Spain) D Rincón	6	6^{2}	3
Q	(Canada) S Diez	5	6	2
8	(Italy) F Agamenone	7	3	6
4	(Austria) F Misolic	3	6^{3}
(Bulgaria) D Kuzmanov	6	7^{7}
(Slovakia) J Kovalík	7^{7}	6
WC	(United States) Richard Zusman	6^{5}	4
(Italy) R Bonadio	1	6	2
(Italy) S Travaglia	6	3	6
(Austria) L Neumayer	6	3	5
Q	(Italy) R Brancaccio	3	6	7

Second round
(France) J Marie	6	6
(Austria) D Novak	3	3
Alt	(Portugal) H Rocha	6	6
8	(Italy) F Agamenone	3	3
(Bulgaria) D Kuzmanov	6	6^{4}	5
(Slovakia) J Kovalík	4	7^{7}	7
(Italy) S Travaglia	6	6
Q	(Italy) R Brancaccio	1	4

Quarterfinals
(France) J Marie	6	7
Alt	(Portugal) H Rocha	3	5
(Slovakia) J Kovalík	5	6	0^{r}
(Italy) S Travaglia	7	3	3

Semifinals
(France) J Marie	2	3
(Italy) S Travaglia	6	6

=== Bottom half ===
First round
7	(Argentina) S Rodríguez Taverna	7	2	7^{13}
WC	(Spain) M Landaluce	5	6	6^{11}
(Italy) F Maestrelli	6	6
Q	(Spain) D Jordà Sanchis	3	4
LL	(Poland) D Michalski	5	6^{3}
(United States) M Damm	7	7^{7}
(Spain) A Moro Cañas	7	5	6
3	(Spain) P Llamas Ruiz	5	7	1
5	(Italy) M Gigante	6	6
(Italy) A Giannessi	2	3
Q	(Bulgaria) A Andreev	4	6	7
Q	(Italy) G Fonio	6	3	5
LL	(Italy) S Caruso	6	4	7
Alt	(United States) M Krueger	4	6	5
Q	(Denmark) A Holmgren	6	4	3
2	(Netherlands) J de Jong	2	6	6

Second round
7	(Argentina) S Rodríguez Taverna	2	4
(Italy) F Maestrelli	6	6
(United States) M Damm	2	6	6
(Spain) A Moro Cañas	6	3	2
5	(Italy) M Gigante	6	6
Q	(Bulgaria) A Andreev	4	3
LL	(Italy) S Caruso	6	1	6
2	(Netherlands) J de Jong	4	6	3

Quarterfinals
(Italy) F Maestrelli	7^{7}	6
(United States) M Damm	6^{4}	2
5	(Italy) M Gigante	6	1	6
LL	(Italy) S Caruso	3	6	2

Semifinals
(Italy) F Maestrelli	0	4
5	(Italy) M Gigante	6	6
