= 2025 Tenerife Challenger II – Doubles =

Doubles
- 2025 Tenerife Challenger II

Final
- Champions: (Peru) Alexander Merino (Germany) Christoph Negritu
- Runners-up: (Israel) Daniel Cukierman (United Kingdom) Joshua Paris
- Score: 2–6, 6–3, [10–8]

Events
Singles	Doubles
← 2025 ·	Tenerife Challenger	· 2026 →

Íñigo Cervantes and Daniel Rincón were the defending champions but lost in the semifinals to Alexander Merino and Christoph Negritu.

Merino and Negritu won the title after defeating Daniel Cukierman and Joshua Paris 2–6, 6–3, [10–8] in the final.

== Seeds ==
1. (Switzerland) Jakub Paul / (Netherlands) Mick Veldheer (semifinals)
2. (Italy) Marco Bortolotti / (Venezuela) Luis David Martínez (quarterfinals)
3. (Canada) Cleeve Harper / (United Kingdom) David Stevenson (first round)
4. (Israel) Daniel Cukierman / (United Kingdom) Joshua Paris (final)

== Draw ==
=== Key ===
- Q = Qualifier
- WC = Wild card
- LL = Lucky loser
- Alt = Alternate
- ITF = ITF entry
- PR = Protected ranking
- SR = Special ranking
- SE = Special exempt
- JE = Junior exempt
- JR = Junior Accelerator Programme entrant
- CO = College Accelerator Programme entrant
- NG = Next Gen Accelerator Program entrant
- w/o = Walkover
- r = Retired
- d = Defaulted

=== Draw ===
First round
1	(Switzerland) J Paul (Netherlands) M Veldheer	6	6
WC	(Spain) D Marrero (United States) Dhruva Mulye	0	1
(Austria) D Pichler (Italy) G Ricca	6	6
Alt	(United Kingdom) J Monday (United Kingdom) R Peniston	4	4
4	(Israel) D Cukierman (United Kingdom) J Paris	7^{7}	7^{7}
(United States) M Kiger (United States) E Spizzirri	6^{4}	6^{2}
(Spain) J Barranco Cosano (Spain) B Pujol Navarro	6	4	[8]
WC	D Golubev (Spain) I Montes de la Torre	3	6	[10]
(United Kingdom) S Duncan (Romania) A Jecan	2	3
(Serbia) I Sabanov (Serbia) M Sabanov	6	6
(Spain) Í Cervantes (Spain) D Rincón	6	4	[10]
3	(Canada) C Harper (United Kingdom) D Stevenson	4	6	[7]
(Peru) A Merino (Germany) C Negritu	6	6
(Lebanon) B Hassan (Spain) D Vega Hernández	3	2
(China) J Cui (France) A Escoffier
2	(Italy) M Bortolotti (Venezuela) LD Martínez	w/o

Quarterfinals
1	(Switzerland) J Paul (Netherlands) M Veldheer	6	6
(Austria) D Pichler (Italy) G Ricca	1	3
4	(Israel) D Cukierman (United Kingdom) J Paris	6	6
WC	D Golubev (Spain) I Montes de la Torre	3	0
(Serbia) I Sabanov (Serbia) M Sabanov	3	5
(Spain) Í Cervantes (Spain) D Rincón	6	7
(Peru) A Merino (Germany) C Negritu	4	6	[10]
2	(Italy) M Bortolotti (Venezuela) LD Martínez	6	2	[8]

Semifinals
1	(Switzerland) J Paul (Netherlands) M Veldheer	4	1
4	(Israel) D Cukierman (United Kingdom) J Paris	6	6
(Spain) Í Cervantes (Spain) D Rincón	6^{5}	4
(Peru) A Merino (Germany) C Negritu	7^{7}	6

Final
4	(Israel) D Cukierman (United Kingdom) J Paris	6	3	[8]
(Peru) A Merino (Germany) C Negritu	2	6	[10]
