= 2026 Tenerife Challenger II – Singles =

Singles
- 2026 Tenerife Challenger II

Final
- Champion: (South Africa) Lloyd Harris
- Runner-up: (Spain) Alejandro Moro Cañas
- Score: 7–5, 7–5

Events
Singles	Doubles
- Tenerife Challenger

Daniel Mérida was the defending champion but lost in the semifinals to Alejandro Moro Cañas.

Lloyd Harris won the title after defeating Moro Cañas 7–5, 7–5 in the final.

== Seeds ==
1. (Italy) Francesco Maestrelli (second round)
2. (Austria) Sebastian Ofner (first round)
3. (Croatia) Luka Mikrut (quarterfinals)
4. (Italy) Stefano Travaglia (quarterfinals)
5. (Spain) Daniel Mérida (semifinals)
6. (South Africa) Lloyd Harris (champion)
7. (Spain) Pablo Llamas Ruiz (semifinals)
8. (United Kingdom) George Loffhagen (first round, retired)

== Draw ==
Key

- Q = Qualifier
- WC = Wild card
- LL = Lucky loser
- Alt = Alternate
- ITF = ITF entry
- PR = Protected ranking
- SR = Special ranking
- SE = Special exempt
- JE = Junior exempt
- JR = Junior Accelerator Programme entrant
- CO = College Accelerator Programme entrant
- NG = Next Gen Accelerator Program entrant
- w/o = Walkover
- r = Retired
- d = Defaulted

=== Finals ===
Semifinals
5	(Spain) Daniel Mérida	2	6	5
WC	(Spain) Alejandro Moro Cañas	6	3	7
7	(Spain) Pablo Llamas Ruiz	4	6^{5}
6	(South Africa) Lloyd Harris	6	7^{7}

Final
WC	(Spain) Alejandro Moro Cañas	5	5
6	(South Africa) Lloyd Harris	7	7

=== Top half ===
First round
1	(Italy) F Maestrelli	4	6	6
Q	(Spain) Sergio Callejón Hernando	6	2	4
SE	(Germany) T Gentzsch	2	6	7^{7}
JR	(United States) Benjamin Willwerth	6	0	6^{1}
(Spain) D Rincón	5	0
(United Kingdom) T Samuel	7	6
(Italy) L Giustino	4	0^{r}
5	(Spain) D Mérida	6	2
4	(Italy) S Travaglia	6	5	7
Q	(Jordan) A Shelbayh	3	7	5
LL	(Czech Republic) H Bartoň	7^{10}	4	6
(United Kingdom) R Peniston	6^{8}	6	3
(France) S Gueymard Wayenburg	6^{6}	4
(Lebanon) B Hassan	7^{8}	6
WC	(Spain) A Moro Cañas	4	6	2
8	(United Kingdom) G Loffhagen	6	2	0^{r}

Second round
1	(Italy) F Maestrelli	4	4
SE	(Germany) T Gentzsch	6	6
(United Kingdom) T Samuel	6^{4}	3
5	(Spain) D Mérida	7^{7}	6
4	(Italy) S Travaglia	6	6
LL	(Czech Republic) H Bartoň	1	3
(Lebanon) B Hassan	1	4
WC	(Spain) A Moro Cañas	6	6

Quarterfinals
SE	(Germany) T Gentzsch	1	4
5	(Spain) D Mérida	6	6
4	(Italy) S Travaglia	4	2
WC	(Spain) A Moro Cañas	6	6

Semifinals
5	(Spain) D Mérida	2	6	5
WC	(Spain) A Moro Cañas	6	3	7

=== Bottom half ===
First round
7	(Spain) P Llamas Ruiz	6	7
WC	(Spain) J Barranco Cosano	4	5
WC	(Italy) J Berrettini	6	6
JR	(Italy) J Vasamì	3	3
(Croatia) M Dodig	3	1
Q	(United Kingdom) G Hussey	6	6
Q	(Spain) Izan Almazán Valiente	1	6	3
3	(Croatia) L Mikrut	6	2	6
6	(South Africa) L Harris	6	6
Q	(Italy) G Piraino	3	4
Q	(Spain) M Damas	7	6
Alt	(Portugal) T Pereira	5	3
Alt	(Spain) P Martín Tiffon	7^{7}	6
SE	(Italy) R Brancaccio	6^{2}	3
(Switzerland) M-A Hüsler	6	6^{6}	6
2	(Austria) S Ofner	3	7^{8}	3

Second round
7	(Spain) P Llamas Ruiz	6	6
WC	(Italy) J Berrettini	2	2
Q	(United Kingdom) G Hussey	4	6	1
3	(Croatia) L Mikrut	6	4	6
6	(South Africa) L Harris	6^{0}	6	6
Q	(Spain) M Damas	7^{7}	3	1
Alt	(Spain) P Martín Tiffon	6	4	6
(Switzerland) M-A Hüsler	2	6	3

Quarterfinals
7	(Spain) P Llamas Ruiz	3	7	6
3	(Croatia) L Mikrut	6	5	2
6	(South Africa) L Harris	6^{6}	6	6
Alt	(Spain) P Martín Tiffon	7^{8}	4	4

Semifinals
7	(Spain) P Llamas Ruiz	4	6^{5}
6	(South Africa) L Harris	6	7^{7}
