= 2026 Tenerife Challenger II – Doubles =

Doubles
- 2026 Tenerife Challenger II

Final
- Champions: (Czech Republic) Filip Duda (Czech Republic) David Poljak
- Runners-up: (Croatia) Luka Mikrut (Portugal) Tiago Pereira
- Score: 7–6^{(7–0)}, 6–3

Events
Singles	Doubles
- Tenerife Challenger

Abdullah Shelbayh and David Vega Hernández were the defending champions but only Vega Hernández chose to defend his title, partnering Alberto Barroso Campos. They withdrew before their first round match.

Filip Duda and David Poljak won the title after defeating Luka Mikrut and Tiago Pereira 7–6^{(7–0)}, 6–3 in the final.

== Seeds ==
1. (Peru) Alexander Merino / (Germany) Christoph Negritu (withdrew)
2. Ivan Liutarevich / (Germany) Tim Rühl (quarterfinals)
3. (Romania) Victor Vlad Cornea / (Poland) Szymon Walków (quarterfinals, withdrew)
4. (Spain) Mario Mansilla Díez / (Spain) Bruno Pujol Navarro (quarterfinals)
5. (Poland) Szymon Kielan / (United Kingdom) Mark Whitehouse (quarterfinals)

== Draw ==
Key

- Q = Qualifier
- WC = Wild card
- LL = Lucky loser
- Alt = Alternate
- ITF = ITF entry
- PR = Protected ranking
- SR = Special ranking
- SE = Special exempt
- JE = Junior exempt
- JR = Junior Accelerator Programme entrant
- CO = College Accelerator Programme entrant
- NG = Next Gen Accelerator Program entrant
- w/o = Walkover
- r = Retired
- d = Defaulted

First round
5	(Poland) S Kielan (United Kingdom) M Whitehouse	6	6
WC	(Spain) Rodrigo Ledesma Sosa (Spain) Saúl Pacheco	0	1
Alt	(Spain) Izan Almazán Valiente (Spain) Sergio Callejón Hernando	7^{7}	1	[10]
(France) M Westphal (United States) T Winegar	6^{2}	6	[8]
4	(Spain) M Mansilla Díez (Spain) B Pujol Navarro	6	6
(Uzbekistan) S Fomin; D Golubev	0	4
(Czech Republic) F Duda (Czech Republic) D Poljak	6	6
WC	(Spain) Samuel García Hernández (Spain) Joel Toral Ocaña	0	4
(Switzerland) M-A Hüsler (Italy) S Travaglia	4	6	[11]
(Spain) P Llamas Ruiz (Spain) B Winter López	6	3	[13]
(Spain) Ignasi Forcano (Spain) Iván Marrero Curbelo	6^{6}	7^{7}	[3]
3	(Romania) V Cornea (Poland) S Walków	7^{8}	6^{3}	[10]
(Croatia) M Dodig (Croatia) A Kalender	2	6^{4}
Alt	(Croatia) L Mikrut (Portugal) T Pereira	6	7^{7}
(Italy) F Bondioli (Italy) G Ricca	1	6^{1}
2	I Liutarevich (Germany) T Rühl	6	7^{7}

Quarterfinals
5	(Poland) S Kielan (United Kingdom) M Whitehouse	3	7	[8]
Alt	(Spain) I Almazán Valiente (Spain) S Callejón Hernando	6	5	[10]
4	(Spain) M Mansilla Díez (Spain) B Pujol Navarro	3	4
(Czech Republic) F Duda (Czech Republic) D Poljak	6	6
(Spain) P Llamas Ruiz (Spain) B Winter López	w/o
3	(Romania) V Cornea (Poland) S Walków
Alt	(Croatia) L Mikrut (Portugal) T Pereira	6	4	[10]
2	I Liutarevich (Germany) T Rühl	3	6	[8]

Semifinals
Alt	(Spain) I Almazán Valiente (Spain) S Callejón Hernando	4	6	[8]
(Czech Republic) F Duda (Czech Republic) D Poljak	6	3	[10]
(Spain) P Llamas Ruiz (Spain) B Winter López	3	4
Alt	(Croatia) L Mikrut (Portugal) T Pereira	6	6

Final
(Czech Republic) F Duda (Czech Republic) D Poljak	7^{7}	6
Alt	(Croatia) L Mikrut (Portugal) T Pereira	6^{0}	3
