= 2024 Tenerife Challenger III – Doubles =

Doubles
- 2024 Tenerife Challenger III

Final
- Champions: (Netherlands) Sander Arends (Netherlands) Sem Verbeek
- Runners-up: (Italy) Marco Bortolotti (Spain) Sergio Martos Gornés
- Score: 6–4, 6–4

Events
Singles	Doubles
← 2024 ·	Tenerife Challenger	· 2025 →

Petr Nouza and Patrik Rikl were the defending champions but lost in the quarterfinals to Sander Arends and Sem Verbeek.

Arends and Verbeek won the title after defeating Marco Bortolotti and Sergio Martos Gornés 6–4, 6–4 in the final.

== Seeds ==
1. (Netherlands) Sander Arends / (Netherlands) Sem Verbeek (champions)
2. (Italy) Marco Bortolotti / (Spain) Sergio Martos Gornés (final)
3. (Czech Republic) Roman Jebavý / (Spain) David Vega Hernández (first round)
4. (Serbia) Ivan Sabanov / (Serbia) Matej Sabanov (quarterfinals)

== Draw ==
Key

- Q = Qualifier
- WC = Wild card
- LL = Lucky loser
- Alt = Alternate
- ITF = ITF entry
- PR = Protected ranking
- SR = Special ranking
- SE = Special exempt
- JE = Junior exempt
- JR = Junior Accelerator Programme entrant
- CO = College Accelerator Programme entrant
- NG = Next Gen Accelerator Program entrant
- w/o = Walkover
- r = Retired
- d = Defaulted

First round
1	(Netherlands) S Arends (Netherlands) S Verbeek	6	6
Alt	(Spain) Carlos López Montagud (Spain) D Mérida	4	1
(Italy) F Maestrelli (Spain) O Roca Batalla	1	3
(Czech Republic) P Nouza (Czech Republic) P Rikl	6	6
4	(Serbia) I Sabanov (Serbia) M Sabanov	7^{7}	6
(United States) R Seggerman (United States) P Trhac	6^{5}	2
(Spain) D Jordà Sanchis (Argentina) S Rodríguez Taverna	6	6
WC	(Spain) D Marrero (United States) Dhruva Mulye	2	3
Alt	(Italy) R Brancaccio (Spain) A Moro Cañas	7^{7}	6
WC	(Spain) Imanol López Morillo (United States) Richard Zusman	6^{4}	3
(United States) M Kiger (United States) M Krueger	3	6	[10]
3	(Czech Republic) R Jebavý (Spain) D Vega Hernández	6	4	[8]
(Austria) L Neumayer (Austria) D Novak	4	6	[6]
(United Kingdom) S Duncan (Denmark) A Holmgren	6	4	[10]
(Romania) A Jecan (Greece) M Kalovelonis	7	3	[5]
2	(Italy) M Bortolotti (Spain) S Martos Gornés	5	6	[10]

Quarterfinals
1	(Netherlands) S Arends (Netherlands) S Verbeek	7^{7}	6^{5}	[10]
(Czech Republic) P Nouza (Czech Republic) P Rikl	6^{4}	7^{7}	[8]
4	(Serbia) I Sabanov (Serbia) M Sabanov	4	6	[7]
(Spain) D Jordà Sanchis (Argentina) S Rodríguez Taverna	6	3	[10]
Alt	(Italy) R Brancaccio (Spain) A Moro Cañas
(United States) M Kiger (United States) M Krueger	w/o
(United Kingdom) S Duncan (Denmark) A Holmgren	4	5
2	(Italy) M Bortolotti (Spain) S Martos Gornés	6	7

Semifinals
1	(Netherlands) S Arends (Netherlands) S Verbeek	6	6
(Spain) D Jordà Sanchis (Argentina) S Rodríguez Taverna	1	0
(United States) M Kiger (United States) M Krueger	2	4
2	(Italy) M Bortolotti (Spain) S Martos Gornés	6	6

Final
1	(Netherlands) S Arends (Netherlands) S Verbeek	6	6
2	(Italy) M Bortolotti (Spain) S Martos Gornés	4	4
