= 2026 Tenerife Challenger – Singles =

Singles
- 2026 Tenerife Challenger

Final
- Champion: (Spain) Daniel Mérida
- Runner-up: (Italy) Francesco Maestrelli
- Score: 6–2, 6–4

Events
Singles	Doubles
- Tenerife Challenger

Pablo Carreño Busta was the defending champion but chose not to defend his title.

Daniel Mérida won the title after defeating Francesco Maestrelli 6–2, 6–4 in the final.

== Seeds ==
1. (Italy) Francesco Maestrelli (final)
2. (Spain) Daniel Mérida (champion)
3. (Italy) Stefano Travaglia (semifinals)
4. (Italy) Lorenzo Giustino (quarterfinals)
5. (United Kingdom) George Loffhagen (quarterfinals)
6. (Spain) Pablo Llamas Ruiz (second round)
7. (United States) Michael Mmoh (second round, retired)
8. (Spain) Alejandro Moro Cañas (quarterfinals)

== Draw ==
Key

- Q = Qualifier
- WC = Wild card
- LL = Lucky loser
- Alt = Alternate
- ITF = ITF entry
- PR = Protected ranking
- SR = Special ranking
- SE = Special exempt
- JE = Junior exempt
- JR = Junior Accelerator Programme entrant
- CO = College Accelerator Programme entrant
- NG = Next Gen Accelerator Program entrant
- w/o = Walkover
- r = Retired
- d = Defaulted

=== Finals ===
Semifinals
1	(Italy) Francesco Maestrelli	6	6
WC	(Spain) Pol Martín Tiffon	4	3
3	(Italy) Stefano Travaglia	1	6	5
2	(Spain) Daniel Mérida	6	3	7

Final
1	(Italy) Francesco Maestrelli	2	4
2	(Spain) Daniel Mérida	6	6

=== Top half ===
First round
1	(Italy) F Maestrelli	6	7^{7}
(France) Mathys Erhard	3	6^{4}
(Italy) J Berrettini	3	2
(Jordan) A Shelbayh	6	6
Q	(United States) Dali Blanch	6^{5}	6	6^{5}
WC	(Italy) J Vasamì	7^{7}	3	7^{7}
(Belgium) G Onclin	4	2
5	(United Kingdom) G Loffhagen	6	6
4	(Italy) L Giustino	7^{7}	7
Q	(Spain) Izan Almazán Valiente	6^{2}	5
(Spain) M Damas	6	6
Q	(France) T Faurel	3	4
WC	(Spain) Sergio Callejón Hernando	3	1
WC	(Spain) P Martín Tiffon	6	6
JR	(United States) Benjamin Willwerth	2	2
6	(Spain) P Llamas Ruiz	6	6

Second round
1	(Italy) F Maestrelli	6	6
(Jordan) A Shelbayh	3	1
WC	(Italy) J Vasamì	5	3
5	(United Kingdom) G Loffhagen	7	6
4	(Italy) L Giustino	6	6
(Spain) M Damas	2	4
WC	(Spain) P Martín Tiffon	5	6	6
6	(Spain) P Llamas Ruiz	7	1	0

Quarterfinals
1	(Italy) F Maestrelli	6	6
5	(United Kingdom) G Loffhagen	4	4
4	(Italy) L Giustino	4	6^{4}
WC	(Spain) P Martín Tiffon	6	7^{7}

Semifinals
1	(Italy) F Maestrelli	6	6
WC	(Spain) P Martín Tiffon	4	3

=== Bottom half ===
First round
7	(United States) M Mmoh	7	7^{9}
(Kazakhstan) M Kukushkin	5	6^{7}
Q	(Italy) Andrea Colombo	3	1
Alt	(Spain) J Barranco Cosano	6	6
Alt	A Kachmazov	6^{2}	7^{7}	2
Alt	(Italy) G Piraino	7^{7}	6^{3}	6
Alt	(Uzbekistan) S Fomin	3	0
3	(Italy) S Travaglia	6	6
8	(Spain) A Moro Cañas	3	6	7
Q	(Finland) Iiro Vasa	6	3	5
(Switzerland) M-A Hüsler	6^{6}	5
(Spain) D Rincón	7^{8}	7
Q	(Spain) A Sánchez Quílez	1	7^{9}	6
(Belgium) K Coppejans	6	6^{7}	4
(United Kingdom) T Samuel	2	4
2	(Spain) D Mérida	6	6

Second round
7	(United States) M Mmoh	6^{1}	3^{r}
Alt	(Spain) J Barranco Cosano	7^{7}	3
Alt	(Italy) G Piraino	3	3
3	(Italy) S Travaglia	6	6
8	(Spain) A Moro Cañas	6	7^{7}
(Spain) D Rincón	3	6^{3}
Q	(Spain) A Sánchez Quílez	5	3
2	(Spain) D Mérida	7	6

Quarterfinals
Alt	(Spain) J Barranco Cosano	2	1
3	(Italy) S Travaglia	6	6
8	(Spain) A Moro Cañas	0	2
2	(Spain) D Mérida	6	6

Semifinals
3	(Italy) S Travaglia	1	6	5
2	(Spain) D Mérida	6	3	7
