= 2023 Tenerife Challenger III – Singles =

Singles
- 2023 Tenerife Challenger III

Final
- Champion: (Italy) Matteo Gigante
- Runner-up: (Italy) Stefano Travaglia
- Score: 6–3, 6–2

Events
Singles	Doubles
← 2023 ·	Tenerife Challenger	· 2024 →

Matteo Arnaldi was the defending champion but chose not to defend his title.

Matteo Gigante won the title after defeating Stefano Travaglia 6–3, 6–2 in the final.

== Seeds ==
1. (Italy) Francesco Passaro (second round)
2. Alexander Shevchenko (first round)
3. (Austria) Filip Misolic (first round, retired)
4. (Italy) Raúl Brancaccio (second round)
5. (United Kingdom) Ryan Peniston (semifinals)
6. (Ukraine) Oleksii Krutykh (first round)
7. (Spain) Carlos Taberner (first round, retired)
8. (Italy) Francesco Maestrelli (quarterfinals)

== Draw ==
=== Key ===
- Q = Qualifier
- WC = Wild card
- LL = Lucky loser
- Alt = Alternate
- SE = Special exempt
- PR = Protected ranking
- ITF = ITF entry
- JE = Junior exempt
- w/o = Walkover
- r = Retired
- d = Defaulted
- SR = Special ranking

=== Finals ===
Semifinals
LL	(Italy) Matteo Gigante	5	7^{7}	6
(Italy) Riccardo Bonadio	7	6^{3}	3
WC	(Italy) Stefano Travaglia	7^{7}	2	6
5	(United Kingdom) Ryan Peniston	6^{4}	6	2

Final
LL	(Italy) Matteo Gigante	6	6
WC	(Italy) Stefano Travaglia	3	2

=== Top half ===
First round
1	(Italy) F Passaro	6	6
Q	(Japan) S Mochizuki	3	4
LL	(Italy) M Gigante	6	6
WC	(Spain) D Rincón	4	2
(Spain) M Landaluce	3	6	6^{4}
(Argentina) S Rodríguez Taverna	6	2	7^{7}
WC	(Spain) P Llamas Ruiz	3
7	(Spain) C Taberner	0^{r}
3	(Austria) F Misolic	6^{2}	0^{r}
(Italy) R Bonadio	7^{7}	4
(Belgium) K Coppejans	6	3	5
(United States) N Moreno de Alboran	3	6	7
LL	(Italy) GM Moroni	3	2
Alt	(Italy) G Mager	6	6
(Czech Republic) L Rosol	3	1
8	(Italy) F Maestrelli	6	6

Second round
1	(Italy) F Passaro	7	2	2
LL	(Italy) M Gigante	5	6	6
(Argentina) S Rodríguez Taverna	2	1^{r}
WC	(Spain) P Llamas Ruiz	6	3
(Italy) R Bonadio	6	7^{7}
(United States) N Moreno de Alboran	3	6^{5}
Alt	(Italy) G Mager	7^{11}	3	4
8	(Italy) F Maestrelli	6^{9}	6	6

Quarterfinals
LL	(Italy) M Gigante	6	6
WC	(Spain) P Llamas Ruiz	2	4
(Italy) R Bonadio	7	6
8	(Italy) F Maestrelli	5	2

Semifinals
LL	(Italy) M Gigante	5	7^{7}	6
(Italy) R Bonadio	7	6^{3}	3

=== Bottom half ===
First round
6	(Ukraine) O Krutykh	2	2
WC	(Italy) S Travaglia	6	6
LL	(Brazil) Oscar José Gutierrez	1	6	6
Alt	(Czech Republic) M Gengel	6	0	3
(Italy) A Giannessi	6	0	6
(Kazakhstan) M Kukushkin	4	6	3
Y Demin	1	2
4	(Italy) R Brancaccio	6	6
5	(United Kingdom) R Peniston	7	7
(Czech Republic) D Svrčina	5	5
Q	(Jordan) A Shelbayh	6	6
Q	(Italy) S Caruso	4	3
Q	(United States) C Harrison	5	4
Q	(Italy) G Fonio	7	6
Q	(China) Y Bu	3	6	7^{7}
2	A Shevchenko	6	1	6^{2}

Second round
WC	(Italy) S Travaglia	6	6
LL	(Brazil) OJ Gutierrez	0	0
(Italy) A Giannessi	6	6
4	(Italy) R Brancaccio	3	2
5	(United Kingdom) R Peniston	6	6
Q	(Jordan) A Shelbayh	1	2
Q	(Italy) G Fonio	7^{7}	6
Q	(China) Y Bu	6^{5}	4

Quarterfinals
WC	(Italy) S Travaglia	6	6
(Italy) A Giannessi	3	4
5	(United Kingdom) R Peniston	7	6
Q	(Italy) G Fonio	5	2

Semifinals
WC	(Italy) S Travaglia	7^{7}	2	6
5	(United Kingdom) R Peniston	6^{4}	6	2
