= 2023 Tenerife Challenger III – Doubles =

Doubles
- 2023 Tenerife Challenger III

Final
- Champions: (Australia) Andrew Harris (United States) Christian Harrison
- Runners-up: (United Kingdom) Luke Johnson (Netherlands) Sem Verbeek
- Score: 7–6^{(8–6)}, 6–7^{(4–7)}, [10–8]

Events
Singles	Doubles
← 2023 ·	Tenerife Challenger	· 2024 →

Christian Harrison and Shintaro Mochizuki were the defending champions but only Harrison chose to defend his title, partnering Andrew Harris. Harrison successfully defended his title, defeating Luke Johnson and Sem Verbeek 7–6^{(8–6)}, 6–7^{(4–7)}, [10–8] in the final.

== Seeds ==
1. (Italy) Marco Bortolotti / (Spain) Sergio Martos Gornés (quarterfinals)
2. (Philippines) Ruben Gonzales / (Brazil) Fernando Romboli (semifinals)
3. (United Kingdom) Luke Johnson / (Netherlands) Sem Verbeek (final)
4. (Australia) Andrew Harris / (United States) Christian Harrison (champions)

== Draw ==
=== Key ===
- Q = Qualifier
- WC = Wild card
- LL = Lucky loser
- Alt = Alternate
- SE = Special exempt
- PR = Protected ranking
- ITF = ITF entry
- JE = Junior exempt
- w/o = Walkover
- r = Retired
- d = Defaulted
- SR = Special ranking

First round
1	(Italy) M Bortolotti (Spain) S Martos Gornés	6	6
(India) A Chandrasekar (India) VS Prashanth	4	3
(Ukraine) O Krutykh (Hungary) F Marozsán	4	5
(Latvia) M Lībietis (Switzerland) L Margaroli	6	7
3	(United Kingdom) L Johnson (Netherlands) S Verbeek	6	6
(Italy) R Brancaccio (Croatia) F Škugor	3	2
WC	(Spain) D Marrero (United States) Dhruva Mulye	4	5
(Italy) R Bonadio (Italy) S Travaglia	6	7
Yan Bondarevskiy; A Shevchenko	6	6
(Canada) S Diez (Argentina) S Rodríguez Taverna	2	4
(Germany) C Frantzen (Germany) T Sandkaulen	4	2
4	(Australia) A Harris (United States) C Harrison	6	6
WC	(Spain) Miguel García (United States) H Rousseau	3	4
Alt	(Italy) GM Moroni (Czech Republic) L Rosol	6	6
(Sweden) F Bergevi (Kazakhstan) G Lomakin	4	6	[8]
2	(Philippines) R Gonzales (Brazil) F Romboli	6	4	[10]

Quarterfinals
1	(Italy) M Bortolotti (Spain) S Martos Gornés	3	4
(Latvia) M Lībietis (Switzerland) L Margaroli	6	6
3	(United Kingdom) L Johnson (Netherlands) S Verbeek	6	7^{7}
(Italy) R Bonadio (Italy) S Travaglia	4	6^{3}
Y Bondarevskiy; A Shevchenko	3	0
4	(Australia) A Harris (United States) C Harrison	6	6
Alt	(Italy) GM Moroni (Czech Republic) L Rosol	6^{5}	6	[5]
2	(Philippines) R Gonzales (Brazil) F Romboli	7^{7}	4	[10]

Semifinals
(Latvia) M Lībietis (Switzerland) L Margaroli	6	1	[5]
3	(United Kingdom) L Johnson (Netherlands) S Verbeek	4	6	[10]
4	(Australia) A Harris (United States) C Harrison	6	6
2	(Philippines) R Gonzales (Brazil) F Romboli	2	4

Final
3	(United Kingdom) L Johnson (Netherlands) S Verbeek	6^{6}	7^{7}	[8]
4	(Australia) A Harris (United States) C Harrison	7^{8}	6^{4}	[10]
