= 2024 Tenerife Challenger III – Singles =

Singles
- 2024 Tenerife Challenger III

Final
- Champion: (Kazakhstan) Mikhail Kukushkin
- Runner-up: (Italy) Matteo Gigante
- Score: 6–2, 2–0 ret.

Events
Singles	Doubles
- Tenerife Challenger

Matteo Gigante was the defending champion but had to retire in the final.

Mikhail Kukushkin won the title after Gigante retired trailing 2–6, 0–2 in the final.

== Seeds ==
1. (Hungary) Zsombor Piros (first round)
2. (Netherlands) Jesper de Jong (withdrew)
3. (Spain) Pablo Llamas Ruiz (first round, retired)
4. (Austria) Filip Misolic (second round)
5. (China) Bu Yunchaokete (semifinals)
6. (Italy) Matteo Gigante (final, retired)
7. (Germany) Rudolf Molleker (first round)
8. Ilya Ivashka (first round)
9. (Spain) Oriol Roca Batalla (first round)

== Draw ==
Key

- Q = Qualifier
- WC = Wild card
- LL = Lucky loser
- Alt = Alternate
- ITF = ITF entry
- PR = Protected ranking
- SR = Special ranking
- SE = Special exempt
- JE = Junior exempt
- JR = Junior Accelerator Programme entrant
- CO = College Accelerator Programme entrant
- NG = Next Gen Accelerator Program entrant
- w/o = Walkover
- r = Retired
- d = Defaulted

=== Finals ===
Semifinals
Q	(Kazakhstan) Mikhail Kukushkin	2	6	7^{7}
WC	(Spain) Martín Landaluce	6	2	6^{4}
5	(China) Bu Yunchaokete	6	6^{0}	6^{7}
6	(Italy) Matteo Gigante	1	7^{7}	7^{9}

Final
Q	(Kazakhstan) Mikhail Kukushkin	6	2
6	(Italy) Matteo Gigante	2	0^{r}

=== Top half ===
First round
1	(Hungary) Z Piros	6	2	3
Q	(Italy) R Brancaccio	1	6	6
WC	(Spain) D Mérida	6	6
Y Demin	1	0
(Italy) F Agamenone	6^{3}	3
Q	(Kazakhstan) M Kukushkin	7^{7}	6
(Bulgaria) D Kuzmanov	6	4	6
7	(Germany) R Molleker	4	6	3
3	(Spain) P Llamas Ruiz	6^{6}	0^{r}
WC	(Spain) M Landaluce	7^{8}	1
Q	(Spain) Carlos López Montagud	6	1
(Italy) A Giannessi	3	0^{r}
(Italy) S Travaglia	3	2
(Austria) L Neumayer	6	6
Q	(Denmark) A Holmgren	6	7
8	I Ivashka	3	5

Second round
Q	(Italy) R Brancaccio	6	1	6^{2}
WC	(Spain) D Mérida	3	6	7^{7}
Q	(Kazakhstan) M Kukushkin	6	7
(Bulgaria) D Kuzmanov	4	5
WC	(Spain) M Landaluce	6	4
Q	(Spain) C López Montagud	2	1^{r}
(Austria) L Neumayer	6	6^{5}	6
Q	(Denmark) A Holmgren	3	7^{7}	4

Quarterfinals
WC	(Spain) D Mérida	3	4
Q	(Kazakhstan) M Kukushkin	6	6
WC	(Spain) M Landaluce	6	6
(Austria) L Neumayer	3	3

Semifinals
Q	(Kazakhstan) M Kukushkin	2	6	7^{7}
WC	(Spain) M Landaluce	6	2	6^{4}

=== Bottom half ===
First round
5	(China) Y Bu	6	2	6
Q	(Lebanon) H Habib	4	6	3
Alt	(Slovakia) J Kovalík	7	6
(Bulgaria) I Radulov	5	2
Alt	(Italy) R Bonadio	6^{5}	6^{5}
(United States) M Damm	7^{7}	7^{7}
WC	(United States) Richard Zusman	2	3
4	(Austria) F Misolic	6	6
6	(Italy) M Gigante	6	6
(Austria) D Novak	1	3
(Spain) D Rincón	7^{7}	4	6^{7}
LL	(United States) M Krueger	6^{5}	6	7^{9}
(France) Jules Marie	6	7^{7}
(Argentina) S Rodríguez Taverna	2	6^{4}
Q	(Spain) A Moro Cañas	7	6
9	(Spain) O Roca Batalla	5	4

Second round
5	(China) Y Bu	6	6
Alt	(Slovakia) J Kovalík	4	4
(United States) M Damm	4	6	7
4	(Austria) F Misolic	6	3	5
6	(Italy) M Gigante	4	6	7^{7}
LL	(United States) M Krueger	6	3	6^{4}
(France) J Marie	4	7^{7}	3
Q	(Spain) A Moro Cañas	6	6^{5}	6

Quarterfinals
5	(China) Y Bu	7^{9}	7^{7}
(United States) M Damm	6^{7}	6^{1}
6	(Italy) M Gigante	7^{7}	7
Q	(Spain) A Moro Cañas	6^{3}	5

Semifinals
5	(China) Y Bu	6	6^{0}	6^{7}
6	(Italy) M Gigante	1	7^{7}	7^{9}
