= 2025 Tenerife Challenger II – Singles =

Singles
- 2025 Tenerife Challenger II

Final
- Champion: (Spain) Pablo Carreño Busta
- Runner-up: (Austria) Filip Misolic
- Score: 6–3, 6–2

Events
Singles	Doubles
- Tenerife Challenger

Pablo Carreño Busta was the defending champion and successfully defended his title after defeating Filip Misolic 6–3, 6–2 in the final.

== Seeds ==
1. (Germany) Dominik Koepfer (quarterfinals)
2. (Finland) Emil Ruusuvuori (second round)
3. (Spain) Pablo Carreño Busta (champion)
4. (Portugal) Henrique Rocha (first round, retired)
5. (Spain) Alejandro Moro Cañas (second round)
6. (Spain) Carlos Taberner (first round)
7. (United States) Eliot Spizzirri (first round)
8. (Lithuania) Vilius Gaubas (first round)

== Draw ==
Key

- Q = Qualifier
- WC = Wild card
- LL = Lucky loser
- Alt = Alternate
- ITF = ITF entry
- PR = Protected ranking
- SR = Special ranking
- SE = Special exempt
- JE = Junior exempt
- JR = Junior Accelerator Programme entrant
- CO = College Accelerator Programme entrant
- NG = Next Gen Accelerator Program entrant
- w/o = Walkover
- r = Retired
- d = Defaulted

=== Finals ===
Semifinals
Q	(Austria) Filip Misolic	6	6
Alt	(Spain) Daniel Rincón	3	2
3	(Spain) Pablo Carreño Busta	6	6
(Lebanon) Benjamin Hassan	3	2

Final
Q	(Austria) Filip Misolic	3	2
3	(Spain) Pablo Carreño Busta	6	6

=== Top half ===
First round
1	(Germany) D Koepfer	6	4	6
Q	(Italy) G Fonio	3	6	2
Q	(Luxembourg) C Rodesch	7^{7}	6
(United Kingdom) J Monday	6^{2}	3
(Peru) I Buse	3	1
Q	(Switzerland) J Paul	6	6
Q	(Austria) F Misolic	4	6	6
6	(Spain) C Taberner	6	1	3
4	(Portugal) H Rocha	2	0^{r}
Q	(Argentina) P Cachin	6	0
Alt	(Spain) D Rincón	7^{12}	6
(Netherlands) M Röttgering	6^{10}	2
Q	(Canada) S Diez	6	6
WC	(Spain) P Llamas Ruiz	4	3
WC	(Spain) N Álvarez Varona	7	6
7	(United States) E Spizzirri	5	0

Second round
1	(Germany) D Koepfer	7	6
Q	(Luxembourg) C Rodesch	5	3
Q	(Switzerland) J Paul	4	4
Q	(Austria) F Misolic	6	6
Q	(Argentina) P Cachin	1	6^{5}
Alt	(Spain) D Rincón	6	7^{7}
Q	(Canada) S Diez	2^{r}
WC	(Spain) N Álvarez Varona	2

Quarterfinals
1	(Germany) D Koepfer	2	6	6^{4}
Q	(Austria) F Misolic	6	2	7^{7}
Alt	(Spain) D Rincón	7^{7}	5	6
WC	(Spain) N Álvarez Varona	6^{4}	7	1

Semifinals
Q	(Austria) F Misolic	6	6
Alt	(Spain) D Rincón	3	2

=== Bottom half ===
First round
8	(Lithuania) V Gaubas	6	4	5
(Jordan) A Shelbayh	4	6	7
WC	(Spain) I Montes de la Torre	6^{6}	0
(Ecuador) A Andrade	7^{8}	6
(France) A Escoffier	6	3	6
Alt	(Lithuania) E Butvilas	2	6	0
Alt	(China) J Cui	3	4
3	(Spain) P Carreño Busta	6	6
5	(Spain) A Moro Cañas	6	6
Alt	(Spain) P Martín Tiffon	4	2
(Lebanon) B Hassan	4	6	7
(Austria) L Neumayer	6	1	5
(Spain) J Barranco Cosano	6	6
(Italy) F Arnaboldi	2	2
(United Kingdom) J Choinski	3	1
2	(Finland) E Ruusuvuori	6	6

Second round
(Jordan) A Shelbayh	7^{7}	2	6
(Ecuador) A Andrade	6^{5}	6	4
(France) A Escoffier
3	(Spain) P Carreño Busta	w/o
5	(Spain) A Moro Cañas	3	6	2
(Lebanon) B Hassan	6	1	6
(Spain) J Barranco Cosano	7	1	6
2	(Finland) E Ruusuvuori	5	6	3

Quarterfinals
(Jordan) A Shelbayh	2	1^{r}
3	(Spain) P Carreño Busta	6	2
(Lebanon) B Hassan	5
(Spain) J Barranco Cosano	4^{r}

Semifinals
3	(Spain) P Carreño Busta	6	6
(Lebanon) B Hassan	3	2
