= 2024 Tenerife Challenger II =

- Date: 19 – 25 February
- Edition: 6th
- Surface: Hard
- Location: Tenerife, Spain

Champions

Singles
- (Italy) Matteo Gigante

Doubles
- (Czech Republic) Petr Nouza / (Czech Republic) Patrik Rikl
- Tenerife Challenger

The 2024 Tenerife Challenger II was a professional tennis tournament played on hardcourts. It was the sixth edition of the tournament which was part of the 2024 ATP Challenger Tour. It took place in Tenerife, Spain between 19 and 25 February 2024.

== Singles main-draw entrants ==
=== Seeds ===
Country	Player	Rank^{1}	Seed
HUN	Zsombor Piros	128	1
NED	Jesper de Jong	141	2
ESP	Pablo Llamas Ruiz	147	3
AUT	Filip Misolic	162	4
ITA	Matteo Gigante	183	5
	~~Ilya Ivashka~~	~~186~~	~~6~~
ARG	Santiago Rodríguez Taverna	196	7
ITA	Franco Agamenone	205	8

- ^{1} Rankings are as of 12 February 2024.

=== Other entrants ===
The following players received wildcards into the singles main draw:

- (Spain) Martín Landaluce
- ~~(Spain) Nikolás Sánchez Izquierdo~~
- (United States) Richard Zusman

The following players received entry into the singles main draw as alternates:

- (United States) Mitchell Krueger
- (Portugal) Henrique Rocha

The following players received entry from the qualifying draw:

- (Bulgaria) Adrian Andreev
- (Italy) Raúl Brancaccio
- (Canada) Steven Diez
- (Italy) Giovanni Fonio
- (Denmark) August Holmgren
- (Spain) David Jordà Sanchis

The following players received entry as lucky losers:

- (Italy) Salvatore Caruso
- (Poland) Daniel Michalski

== Champions ==
=== Singles ===
- (Italy) Matteo Gigante def. (Italy) Stefano Travaglia 6–2, 6–4.

=== Doubles ===
- (Czech Republic) Petr Nouza / (Czech Republic) Patrik Rikl def. (Netherlands) Sander Arends / (Netherlands) Sem Verbeek 6–4, 4–6, [11–9].
