= 2024 Tenerife Challenger – Doubles =

Doubles
- 2024 Tenerife Challenger

Final
- Champions: (United States) Vasil Kirkov (Venezuela) Luis David Martínez
- Runners-up: (Poland) Karol Drzewiecki (Poland) Piotr Matuszewski
- Score: 3–6, 6–4, [10–3]

Events
Singles	Doubles
← 2023 ·	Tenerife Challenger	· 2024 →

Andrew Harris and Christian Harrison were the defending champions but chose not to defend their title.

Vasil Kirkov and Luis David Martínez won the title after defeating Karol Drzewiecki and Piotr Matuszewski 3–6, 6–4, [10–3] in the final.

== Seeds ==
1. (France) Théo Arribagé / (France) Luca Sanchez (quarterfinals)
2. (India) Arjun Kadhe / (India) Jeevan Nedunchezhiyan (quarterfinals)
3. (Czech Republic) Roman Jebavý / (Austria) Philipp Oswald (quarterfinals)
4. (Netherlands) Sander Arends / (Netherlands) Sem Verbeek (quarterfinals)

== Draw ==
Key

- Q = Qualifier
- WC = Wild card
- LL = Lucky loser
- Alt = Alternate
- ITF = ITF entry
- PR = Protected ranking
- SR = Special ranking
- SE = Special exempt
- JE = Junior exempt
- JR = Junior Accelerator Programme entrant
- CO = College Accelerator Programme entrant
- NG = Next Gen Accelerator Program entrant
- w/o = Walkover
- r = Retired
- d = Defaulted

First round
1	(France) T Arribagé (France) L Sanchez	6	6
(Serbia) I Sabanov (Serbia) M Sabanov	3	2
(Latvia) M Lībietis (Finland) P Niklas-Salminen	6	4	[10]
Alt	(France) G Blancaneaux (France) B Paire	2	6	[7]
3	(Czech Republic) R Jebavý (Austria) P Oswald	6	0	[12]
(Belgium) M Geerts (Spain) S Martos Gornés	1	6	[10]
(Poland) K Drzewiecki (Poland) P Matuszewski	7	6
WC	(India) Sathi Reddy Chirala (Italy) F Fognini	5	3
(United States) V Kirkov (Venezuela) LD Martínez	6	6
(Romania) A Jecan (Croatia) N Serdarušić	4	3
(Spain) Í Cervantes (Spain) D Vega Hernández	2	3
4	(Netherlands) S Arends (Netherlands) S Verbeek	6	6
(Ukraine) V Manafov (Poland) S Walków	3	5
(Sweden) F Bergevi (Netherlands) M Veldheer	6	7
WC	(Spain) D Marrero (United States) Dhruva Mulye	2	1
2	(India) A Kadhe (India) J Nedunchezhiyan	6	6

Quarterfinals
1	(France) T Arribagé (France) L Sanchez	6	4	[8]
(Latvia) M Lībietis (Finland) P Niklas-Salminen	4	6	[10]
3	(Czech Republic) R Jebavý (Austria) P Oswald	3	3
(Poland) K Drzewiecki (Poland) P Matuszewski	6	6
(United States) V Kirkov (Venezuela) LD Martínez	7^{7}	3	[10]
4	(Netherlands) S Arends (Netherlands) S Verbeek	6^{3}	6	[8]
(Sweden) F Bergevi (Netherlands) M Veldheer	6^{4}	6	[10]
2	(India) A Kadhe (India) J Nedunchezhiyan	7^{7}	4	[8]

Semifinals
(Latvia) M Lībietis (Finland) P Niklas-Salminen	6^{3}	6	[4]
(Poland) K Drzewiecki (Poland) P Matuszewski	7^{7}	1	[10]
(United States) V Kirkov (Venezuela) LD Martínez	6	7^{7}
(Sweden) F Bergevi (Netherlands) M Veldheer	4	6^{3}

Final
(Poland) K Drzewiecki (Poland) P Matuszewski	6	4	[3]
(United States) V Kirkov (Venezuela) LD Martínez	3	6	[10]
