= 2023 Tenerife Challenger II – Doubles =

Doubles
- 2023 Tenerife Challenger II

Final
- Champions: (United States) Christian Harrison (Japan) Shintaro Mochizuki
- Runners-up: (Italy) Matteo Gigante (Italy) Francesco Passaro
- Score: 6–4, 6–3

Events
Singles	Doubles
← 2023 ·	Tenerife Challenger	· 2023 →

Victor Vlad Cornea and Sergio Martos Gornés were the defending champions but only Martos Gornés chose to defend his title, partnering Marco Bortolotti. Martos Gornés lost in the semifinals to Matteo Gigante and Francesco Passaro.

Christian Harrison and Shintaro Mochizuki won the title after defeating Gigante and Passaro 6–4, 6–3 in the final.

== Seeds ==
1. (France) Sadio Doumbia / (France) Fabien Reboul (withdrew)
2. (Italy) Marco Bortolotti / (Spain) Sergio Martos Gornés (semifinals)
3. (United Kingdom) Luke Johnson / (Netherlands) Sem Verbeek (quarterfinals)
4. (Belgium) Michael Geerts / (Switzerland) Luca Margaroli (first round)

== Draw ==
=== Key ===
- Q = Qualifier
- WC = Wild card
- LL = Lucky loser
- Alt = Alternate
- SE = Special exempt
- PR = Protected ranking
- ITF = ITF entry
- JE = Junior exempt
- w/o = Walkover
- r = Retired
- d = Defaulted
- SR = Special ranking

First round
Alt	(Italy) G Mager (Italy) S Travaglia	6	1	[10]
Alt	(Ukraine) O Krutykh (Czech Republic) L Rosol	2	6	[8]
(Canada) S Diez (Serbia) N Milojević	1	1
Alt	(United States) C Harrison (Japan) S Mochizuki	6	6
3	(United Kingdom) L Johnson (Netherlands) S Verbeek	6	7^{7}
(Argentina) S Rodríguez Taverna (Brazil) F Romboli	2	6^{3}
(Croatia) Z Babić (Poland) P Matuszewski	1	0
Alt	(Italy) S Caruso (Italy) A Giannessi	6	6
(Italy) R Brancaccio (Croatia) F Škugor	6	6^{4}	[1]
(Italy) M Gigante (Italy) F Passaro	4	7^{7}	[10]
(Italy) R Bonadio (Italy) F Maestrelli	7	6
4	(Belgium) M Geerts (Switzerland) L Margaroli	5	4
PR	(Italy) R Marcora (France) B Paire	6	6
WC	(Spain) D Marrero (United States) Dhruva Mulye	4	1
I Liutarevich (Kazakhstan) G Lomakin	2	5
2	(Italy) M Bortolotti (Spain) S Martos Gornés	6	7

Quarterfinals
Alt	(Italy) G Mager (Italy) S Travaglia	4	0
Alt	(United States) C Harrison (Japan) S Mochizuki	6	6
3	(United Kingdom) L Johnson (Netherlands) S Verbeek	6	6^{2}	[5]
Alt	(Italy) S Caruso (Italy) A Giannessi	3	7^{7}	[10]
(Italy) M Gigante (Italy) F Passaro	6	7^{7}
(Italy) R Bonadio (Italy) F Maestrelli	4	6^{3}
PR	(Italy) R Marcora (France) B Paire	3	2
2	(Italy) M Bortolotti (Spain) S Martos Gornés	6	6

Semifinals
Alt	(United States) C Harrison (Japan) S Mochizuki	6	7
Alt	(Italy) S Caruso (Italy) A Giannessi	3	5
(Italy) M Gigante (Italy) F Passaro	6	6
2	(Italy) M Bortolotti (Spain) S Martos Gornés	3	4

Final
Alt	(United States) C Harrison (Japan) S Mochizuki	6	6
(Italy) M Gigante (Italy) F Passaro	4	3
