= 2021 Tenerife Challenger – Doubles =

Doubles
- 2021 Tenerife Challenger

Final
- Champions: (Portugal) Nuno Borges (Portugal) Francisco Cabral
- Runners-up: (India) Jeevan Nedunchezhiyan (India) Purav Raja
- Score: 6–3, 6–4

Events
Singles	Doubles
Tenerife Challenger	· 2023 →

This was the first edition of the tournament.

Nuno Borges and Francisco Cabral won the title after defeating Jeevan Nedunchezhiyan and Purav Raja 6–3, 6–4 in the final.

== Seeds ==
1. (France) Sadio Doumbia / (France) Fabien Reboul (quarterfinals)
2. (India) Jeevan Nedunchezhiyan / (India) Purav Raja (final)
3. (Portugal) Nuno Borges / (Portugal) Francisco Cabral (champions)
4. (Tunisia) Aziz Dougaz / (France) Manuel Guinard (quarterfinals)

== Draw ==
=== Key ===
- Q = Qualifier
- WC = Wild card
- LL = Lucky loser
- Alt = Alternate
- SE = Special exempt
- PR = Protected ranking
- ITF = ITF entry
- JE = Junior exempt
- w/o = Walkover
- r = Retired
- d = Defaulted
- SR = Special ranking

First round
1	(France) S Doumbia (France) F Reboul	6	6
PR	(Belgium) K Coppejans (Belgium) J De Loore	1	4
(Switzerland) J Paul (France) A Reymond	5	4
(Turkey) A Çelikbilek (Turkey) E Kırkın	7	6
3	(Portugal) N Borges (Portugal) F Cabral	6	6
WC	(Spain) Jorge Carlos Camara (Spain) Miguel García	1	2
WC	(United States) Dhruva Mulye (Spain) D Vega Hernández	3	3
PR	(Zimbabwe) CJ Lock (Chinese Taipei) C-h Tseng	6	6
(Belgium) M Geerts (Ecuador) E Gómez	3	4
(Spain) F López (Spain) F Verdasco	6	6
(Netherlands) T Griekspoor (France) Q Halys	6^{3}	6^{5}
4	(Tunisia) A Dougaz (France) M Guinard	7^{7}	7^{7}
WC	(Spain) Iván Marrero Curbelo (Haiti) H Rousseau	w/o
(Morocco) E Benchetrit (Ukraine) V Orlov
(Italy) T Fabbiano (Portugal) F Ferreira Silva	1	4
2	(India) J Nedunchezhiyan (India) P Raja	6	6

Quarterfinals
1	(France) S Doumbia (France) F Reboul	6	4	[7]
(Turkey) A Çelikbilek (Turkey) E Kırkın	4	6	[10]
3	(Portugal) N Borges (Portugal) F Cabral	6	6
PR	(Zimbabwe) CJ Lock (Chinese Taipei) C-h Tseng	2	0
(Spain) F López (Spain) F Verdasco	7^{7}	7^{7}
4	(Tunisia) A Dougaz (France) M Guinard	6^{3}	6^{5}
WC	(Spain) I Marrero Curbelo (Haiti) H Rousseau	6	5	[6]
2	(India) J Nedunchezhiyan (India) P Raja	3	7	[10]

Semifinals
(Turkey) A Çelikbilek (Turkey) E Kırkın	1	4
3	(Portugal) N Borges (Portugal) F Cabral	6	6
(Spain) F López (Spain) F Verdasco
2	(India) J Nedunchezhiyan (India) P Raja	w/o

Final
3	(Portugal) N Borges (Portugal) F Cabral	6	6
2	(India) J Nedunchezhiyan (India) P Raja	3	4
