= 2023 Tenerife Challenger – Doubles =

Doubles
- 2023 Tenerife Challenger

Final
- Champions: (Romania) Victor Vlad Cornea (Spain) Sergio Martos Gornés
- Runners-up: (Finland) Patrik Niklas-Salminen (Netherlands) Bart Stevens
- Score: 6–3, 6–4

Events
| Singles | Doubles |
| ← 2021 · | Tenerife Challenger | · 2023 → |

Nuno Borges and Francisco Cabral were the defending champions but chose not to defend their title.

Victor Vlad Cornea and Sergio Martos Gornés won the title after defeating Patrik Niklas-Salminen and Bart Stevens 6–3, 6–4 in the final.

== Seeds ==
1. (Netherlands) Sander Arends / (Netherlands) David Pel (first round)
2. (United Kingdom) Jonny O'Mara / (Poland) Szymon Walków (quarterfinals)
3. (Italy) Marco Bortolotti / (Germany) Fabian Fallert (first round)
4. (Monaco) Romain Arneodo / (Austria) Sam Weissborn (first round)

== Draw ==
=== Key ===
- Q = Qualifier
- WC = Wild card
- LL = Lucky loser
- Alt = Alternate
- SE = Special exempt
- PR = Protected ranking
- ITF = ITF entry
- JE = Junior exempt
- w/o = Walkover
- r = Retired
- d = Defaulted
- SR = Special ranking

First round
1 | (Netherlands) S Arends (Netherlands) D Pel | 4 | 6 | [5]
(Italy) F Cobolli (Italy) F Passaro | 6 | 4 | [10]
(Kazakhstan) G Lomakin; A Shevchenko | 6 | 6
WC | (Spain) D Marrero (United States) Dhruva Mulye | 4 | 3
4 | (Monaco) R Arneodo (Austria) S Weissborn | 5 | 7^{7} | [11]
(Finland) P Niklas-Salminen (Netherlands) B Stevens | 7 | 6^{3} | [13]
WC | (Spain) Iván Marrero Curbelo (United States) H Rousseau | 1 | 2
(India) A Kadhe (Brazil) F Romboli | 6 | 6
Alt | (Belgium) Y Mertens (Argentina) S Rodríguez Taverna | 0
(United States) A Lawson (New Zealand) A Sitak | 0^{r}
I Liutarevich (Ukraine) V Manafov | 6^{4} | 7^{7} | [12]
3 | (Italy) M Bortolotti (Germany) F Fallert | 7^{7} | 6^{5} | [10]
(Romania) VV Cornea (Spain) S Martos Gornés | 6 | 6
(Germany) C Frantzen (United States) R Stalder | 4 | 3
(Germany) H Jebens (Ukraine) D Molchanov | 6^{3} | 2
2 | (United Kingdom) J O'Mara (Poland) S Walków | 7^{7} | 6

Quarterfinals
(Italy) F Cobolli (Italy) F Passaro | 6 | 4 | [10]
(Kazakhstan) G Lomakin; A Shevchenko | 3 | 6 | [5]
(Finland) P Niklas-Salminen (Netherlands) B Stevens | 6 | 6
(India) A Kadhe (Brazil) F Romboli | 3 | 1
Alt | (Belgium) Y Mertens (Argentina) S Rodríguez Taverna | 3 | 4
I Liutarevich (Ukraine) V Manafov | 6 | 6
(Romania) VV Cornea (Spain) S Martos Gornés | 7^{7} | 1 | [10]
2 | (United Kingdom) J O'Mara (Poland) S Walków | 6^{5} | 6 | [7]

Semifinals
(Italy) F Cobolli (Italy) F Passaro | 4 | 2
(Finland) P Niklas-Salminen (Netherlands) B Stevens | 6 | 6
I Liutarevich (Ukraine) V Manafov | 7^{8} | 4 | [8]
(Romania) VV Cornea (Spain) S Martos Gornés | 6^{6} | 6 | [10]

Final
(Finland) P Niklas-Salminen (Netherlands) B Stevens | 3 | 4
(Romania) VV Cornea (Spain) S Martos Gornés | 6 | 6
