= 2023 Tenerife Challenger – Singles =

Singles
- 2023 Tenerife Challenger

Final
- Champion: Alexander Shevchenko
- Runner-up: (Austria) Sebastian Ofner
- Score: 7–5, 6–2

Events
Singles	Doubles
← 2021 ·	Tenerife Challenger	· 2023 →

Tallon Griekspoor was the defending champion but chose not to defend his title.

Alexander Shevchenko won the title after defeating Sebastian Ofner 7–5, 6–2 in the final.

== Seeds ==
1. (Moldova) Radu Albot (first round)
2. (Italy) Francesco Passaro (quarterfinals)
3. (Croatia) Borna Gojo (first round)
4. (France) Manuel Guinard (first round)
5. Alexander Shevchenko (champion)
6. (Italy) Luca Nardi (first round)
7. (Italy) Flavio Cobolli (second round)
8. (Spain) Carlos Taberner (first round)

== Draw ==
=== Key ===
- Q = Qualifier
- WC = Wild card
- LL = Lucky loser
- Alt = Alternate
- SE = Special exempt
- PR = Protected ranking
- ITF = ITF entry
- JE = Junior exempt
- w/o = Walkover
- r = Retired
- d = Defaulted
- SR = Special ranking

=== Finals ===
Semifinals
(Italy) Francesco Maestrelli	4	3
5	Alexander Shevchenko	6	6
(Austria) Sebastian Ofner	6	6
Q	(Hungary) Máté Valkusz	3	4

Final
5	Alexander Shevchenko	7	6
(Austria) Sebastian Ofner	5	2

=== Top half ===
First round
1	(Moldova) R Albot	3	4
(United States) N Moreno de Alboran	6	6
Q	(United States) U Blanch	2	3
WC	(Italy) M Gigante	6	6
(Italy) F Maestrelli	4	7	7^{8}
Q	(Germany) Lucas Gerch	6	5	6^{6}
(Serbia) N Milojević	1	2
7	(Italy) F Cobolli	6	6
3	(Croatia) B Gojo	3	2
(Belgium) K Coppejans	6	6
(United States) S Kozlov	6^{2}	6	1^{r}
Q	(Italy) L Giustino	7^{7}	2	4
(Argentina) S Rodríguez Taverna	2	6^{5}
(Dominican Republic) N Hardt	6	7^{7}
Q	(Latvia) E Gulbis	4	3
5	A Shevchenko	6	6

Second round
(United States) N Moreno de Alboran	6^{4}	5
WC	(Italy) M Gigante	7^{7}	7
(Italy) F Maestrelli	6	7
7	(Italy) F Cobolli	3	5
(Belgium) K Coppejans	3	3
Q	(Italy) L Giustino	6	6
(Dominican Republic) N Hardt	4	4
5	A Shevchenko	6	6

Quarterfinals
WC	(Italy) M Gigante	6	1	3
(Italy) F Maestrelli	1	6	6
Q	(Italy) L Giustino	4	5
5	A Shevchenko	6	7

Semifinals
(Italy) F Maestrelli	4	3
5	A Shevchenko	6	6

=== Bottom half ===
First round
6	(Italy) L Nardi	6^{9}	7^{7}	4
(Austria) S Ofner	7^{11}	6^{1}	6
(Hungary) F Marozsán	7^{11}	3	6
WC	(Spain) A Moro Cañas	6^{9}	6	4
(Italy) G Mager	6	6
(Czech Republic) L Rosol	2	3
(Italy) R Bonadio	3	6	6
4	(France) M Guinard	6	4	4
8	(Spain) C Taberner	6^{5}	3
Q	(Hungary) M Valkusz	7^{7}	6
(Argentina) M Trungelliti	7^{7}	2	7
Q	(Austria) L Neumayer	6^{3}	6	5
(Japan) K Uchida	7^{7}	3	6
(France) B Paire	6^{5}	6	3
WC	(Spain) N Sánchez Izquierdo	1	4
2	(Italy) F Passaro	6	6

Second round
(Austria) S Ofner	6	6
(Hungary) F Marozsán	4	4
(Italy) G Mager	2	4
(Italy) R Bonadio	6	6
Q	(Hungary) M Valkusz	6	6
(Argentina) M Trungelliti	1	4
(Japan) K Uchida	3	1
2	(Italy) F Passaro	6	6

Quarterfinals
(Austria) S Ofner	6	6
(Italy) R Bonadio	4	2
Q	(Hungary) M Valkusz	6	6
2	(Italy) F Passaro	4	3

Semifinals
(Austria) S Ofner	6	6
Q	(Hungary) M Valkusz	3	4
