= 2026 Tenerife Challenger – Doubles =

Doubles
- 2026 Tenerife Challenger

Final
- Champions: (Jordan) Abdullah Shelbayh (Spain) David Vega Hernández
- Runners-up: (Spain) Pablo Llamas Ruiz (Spain) Benjamín Winter López
- Score: 6–2, 6–4

Events
Singles	Doubles
- Tenerife Challenger

Alexander Merino and Christoph Negritu were the defending champions but chose not to defend their title.

Abdullah Shelbayh and David Vega Hernández won the title after defeating Pablo Llamas Ruiz and Benjamín Winter López 6–2, 6–4 in the final.

== Seeds ==
1. (Spain) Sergio Martos Gornés / (India) Vijay Sundar Prashanth (semifinals)
2. (Poland) Szymon Kielan / (Poland) Filip Pieczonka (withdrew)
3. (Spain) Mario Mansilla Díez / (Spain) Bruno Pujol Navarro (first round)
4. (France) Max Westphal / (United States) Theodore Winegar (quarterfinals)

== Draw ==
Key

- Q = Qualifier
- WC = Wild card
- LL = Lucky loser
- Alt = Alternate
- ITF = ITF entry
- PR = Protected ranking
- SR = Special ranking
- SE = Special exempt
- JE = Junior exempt
- JR = Junior Accelerator Programme entrant
- CO = College Accelerator Programme entrant
- NG = Next Gen Accelerator Program entrant
- w/o = Walkover
- r = Retired
- d = Defaulted

First round
1	(Spain) S Martos Gornés (India) VS Prashanth	2	6	[12]
(Spain) A Moro Cañas (Spain) D Rincón	6	2	[10]
(Italy) J Berrettini (Italy) F Maestrelli	2	6	[10]
(Spain) Iván Marrero Curbelo (Spain) P Martín Tiffon	6	4	[7]
4	(France) M Westphal (United States) T Winegar	6	7
WC	(Uzbekistan) S Fomin; D Golubev	0	5
WC	(Spain) Rodrigo Ledesma Sosa (Spain) Saúl Pacheco	2	0
(Jordan) A Shelbayh (Spain) D Vega Hernández	6	6
(United States) Dali Blanch (Poland) F Peliwo	4	2
(Switzerland) M-A Hüsler (Italy) S Travaglia	6	6
(Belgium) K Coppejans (Belgium) G Onclin	7	6
3	(Spain) M Mansilla Díez (Spain) B Pujol Navarro	5	4
A Kachmazov (Greece) Pe Tsitsipas	4	3
(Spain) P Llamas Ruiz (Spain) B Winter López	6	6
(Spain) Izan Almazán Valiente (Spain) Sergio Callejón Hernando	5	7^{7}	[10]
Alt	(Spain) A Sánchez Quílez (Finland) Iiro Vasa	7	6^{3}	[5]

Quarterfinals
1	(Spain) S Martos Gornés (India) VS Prashanth	7^{7}	6
(Italy) J Berrettini (Italy) F Maestrelli	6^{3}	4
4	(France) M Westphal (United States) T Winegar	2	7^{7}	[3]
(Jordan) A Shelbayh (Spain) D Vega Hernández	6	6^{3}	[10]
(Switzerland) M-A Hüsler (Italy) S Travaglia	6	6
(Belgium) K Coppejans (Belgium) G Onclin	4	4
(Spain) P Llamas Ruiz (Spain) B Winter López	7	6
(Spain) I Almazán Valiente (Spain) S Callejón Hernando	5	1

Semifinals
1	(Spain) S Martos Gornés (India) VS Prashanth	3	3
(Jordan) A Shelbayh (Spain) D Vega Hernández	6	6
(Switzerland) M-A Hüsler (Italy) S Travaglia	4	5
(Spain) P Llamas Ruiz (Spain) B Winter López	6	7

Final
(Jordan) A Shelbayh (Spain) D Vega Hernández	6	6
(Spain) P Llamas Ruiz (Spain) B Winter López	2	4
