= 2026 Tenerife Challenger II =

- Date: 9 – 15 February
- Edition: 11th
- Surface: Hard
- Location: Tenerife, Spain

Champions

Singles
- (South Africa) Lloyd Harris

Doubles
- (Czech Republic) Filip Duda / (Czech Republic) David Poljak
- Tenerife Challenger

The 2026 Tenerife Challenger II was a professional tennis tournament played on hardcourts. It was the 11th edition of the tournament which was part of the 2026 ATP Challenger Tour. It took place in Tenerife, Spain between 9 and 15 February 2026.

== Singles main-draw entrants ==
=== Seeds ===
Country	Player	Rank^{1}	Seed
ITA	Francesco Maestrelli	117	1
AUT	Sebastian Ofner	135	2
CRO	Luka Mikrut	164	3
ITA	Stefano Travaglia	178	4
ESP	Daniel Mérida	183	5
RSA	Lloyd Harris	185	6
ESP	Pablo Llamas Ruiz	204	7
GBR	George Loffhagen	205	8

- ^{1} Rankings are as of 2 February 2026.

=== Other entrants ===
The following players received wildcards into the singles main draw:

- (Spain) Javier Barranco Cosano
- (Italy) Jacopo Berrettini
- (Spain) Alejandro Moro Cañas

The following players received entry into the singles main draw as special exempts:

- (Italy) Raúl Brancaccio
- (Germany) Tom Gentzsch

The following players received entry into the singles main draw through the Junior Accelerator programme:

- (Italy) Jacopo Vasamì
- (United States) Benjamin Willwerth

The following players received entry into the singles main draw as alternates:

- (Spain) Pol Martín Tiffon
- (Portugal) Tiago Pereira

The following players received entry from the qualifying draw:

- (Spain) Izan Almazán Valiente
- (Spain) Sergio Callejón Hernando
- (Spain) Miguel Damas
- (United Kingdom) Giles Hussey
- (Italy) Gabriele Piraino
- (Jordan) Abdullah Shelbayh

The following player received entry as a lucky loser:

- (Czech Republic) Hynek Bartoň

== Champions ==
=== Singles ===
- (South Africa) Lloyd Harris def. (Spain) Alejandro Moro Cañas 7–5, 7–5.

=== Doubles ===
- (Czech Republic) Filip Duda / (Czech Republic) David Poljak def. (Croatia) Luka Mikrut / (Portugal) Tiago Pereira 7–6^{(7–0)}, 6–3.
