= 2025 Tenerife Challenger – Singles =

Singles
- 2025 Tenerife Challenger

Final
- Champion: (Spain) Pablo Carreño Busta
- Runner-up: (Spain) Alejandro Moro Cañas
- Score: 6–3, 6–2

Events
Singles	Doubles
- Tenerife Challenger

Mikhail Kukushkin was the defending champion but chose not to defend his title.

Pablo Carreño Busta won the title after defeating Alejandro Moro Cañas 6–3, 6–2 in the final.

== Seeds ==
1. (Germany) Dominik Koepfer (second round)
2. (Finland) Emil Ruusuvuori (first round)
3. (Spain) Pablo Carreño Busta (champion)
4. (Portugal) Henrique Rocha (semifinals)
5. (Spain) Alejandro Moro Cañas (final)
6. (Lithuania) Vilius Gaubas (quarterfinals)
7. (United Kingdom) Jan Choinski (first round)
8. (Austria) Lukas Neumayer (first round)

== Draw ==
Key

- Q = Qualifier
- WC = Wild card
- LL = Lucky loser
- Alt = Alternate
- ITF = ITF entry
- PR = Protected ranking
- SR = Special ranking
- SE = Special exempt
- JE = Junior exempt
- JR = Junior Accelerator Programme entrant
- CO = College Accelerator Programme entrant
- NG = Next Gen Accelerator Program entrant
- w/o = Walkover
- r = Retired
- d = Defaulted

=== Finals ===
Semifinals
(Spain) Pol Martín Tiffon	4	0
3	(Spain) Pablo Carreño Busta	6	6
4	(Portugal) Henrique Rocha	2	7^{8}	0
5	(Spain) Alejandro Moro Cañas	6	6^{6}	6

Final
3	(Spain) Pablo Carreño Busta	6	6
5	(Spain) Alejandro Moro Cañas	3	2

=== Top half ===
First round
1	(Germany) D Koepfer	6	6
WC	(Spain) B Zapata Miralles	2	2
(United Kingdom) J Monday	6	6
(United States) E Spizzirri	2	4
(Spain) P Martín Tiffon	2	6	6
Q	(Argentina) P Cachin	6	4	2
(Spain) J Barranco Cosano	1	6	6
8	(Austria) L Neumayer	6	4	4
3	(Spain) P Carreño Busta	6	7^{7}
(Italy) F Arnaboldi	0	6^{2}
Q	(Italy) G Fonio	4	6	6
Q	(France) A Reymond	6	1	2
(Spain) D Rincón	2	4
Q	(Spain) N Álvarez Varona	6	6
(Italy) G Zeppieri
6	(Lithuania) V Gaubas	w/o

Second round
1	(Germany) D Koepfer	6	6^{4}	6^{4}
(United Kingdom) J Monday	3	7^{7}	7^{7}
(Spain) P Martín Tiffon	6	6
(Spain) J Barranco Cosano	2	4
3	(Spain) P Carreño Busta	6	6
Q	(Italy) G Fonio	1	2
Q	(Spain) N Álvarez Varona	6	4	6^{4}
6	(Lithuania) V Gaubas	4	6	7^{7}

Quarterfinals
(United Kingdom) J Monday	5	2
(Spain) P Martín Tiffon	7	6
3	(Spain) P Carreño Busta	4	6	7^{7}
6	(Lithuania) V Gaubas	6	3	6^{3}

Semifinals
(Spain) P Martín Tiffon	4	0
3	(Spain) P Carreño Busta	6	6

=== Bottom half ===
First round
7	(United Kingdom) J Choinski	4	4
Q	(Slovakia) L Pokorný	6	6
(Peru) I Buse	7^{7}	2	5
(Jordan) A Shelbayh	6^{5}	6	7
(Italy) F Maestrelli	4	2
(Lithuania) E Butvilas	6	6
Q	(Germany) C Negritu	4	1
4	(Portugal) H Rocha	6	6
5	(Spain) A Moro Cañas	6	4	6
(Kazakhstan) D Yevseyev	1	6	3
(Ecuador) A Andrade	3	6	4
WC	(Spain) P Llamas Ruiz	6	3	6
(Lebanon) B Hassan	4	6	6
(Japan) R Sakamoto	6	2	4
WC	(Spain) I Montes de la Torre	7	6
2	(Finland) E Ruusuvuori	5	3

Second round
Q	(Slovakia) L Pokorný	4	1
(Jordan) A Shelbayh	6	6
(Lithuania) E Butvilas	4	5
4	(Portugal) H Rocha	6	7
5	(Spain) A Moro Cañas	7^{7}	6
WC	(Spain) P Llamas Ruiz	6^{4}	4
(Lebanon) B Hassan	6	7
WC	(Spain) I Montes de la Torre	2	5

Quarterfinals
(Jordan) A Shelbayh	6	6^{2}	4
4	(Portugal) H Rocha	4	7^{7}	6
5	(Spain) A Moro Cañas	6	3	6
(Lebanon) B Hassan	4	6	3

Semifinals
4	(Portugal) H Rocha	2	7^{8}	0
5	(Spain) A Moro Cañas	6	6^{6}	6
