= 2024 Tenerife Challenger III =

- Date: 26 February – 3 March
- Edition: 7th
- Surface: Hard
- Location: Tenerife, Spain

Champions

Singles
- (Kazakhstan) Mikhail Kukushkin

Doubles
- (Netherlands) Sander Arends / (Netherlands) Sem Verbeek
- Tenerife Challenger

The 2024 Tenerife Challenger III was a professional tennis tournament played on hardcourts. It was the seventh edition of the tournament which was part of the 2024 ATP Challenger Tour. It took place in Tenerife, Spain between 26 February and 3 March 2024.

== Singles main-draw entrants ==
=== Seeds ===
Country	Player	Rank^{1}	Seed
HUN	Zsombor Piros	110	1
~~NED~~	~~Jesper de Jong~~	~~143~~	~~2~~
ESP	Pablo Llamas Ruiz	148	3
AUT	Filip Misolic	159	4
CHN	Bu Yunchaokete	180	5
ITA	Matteo Gigante	183	6
GER	Rudolf Molleker	185	7
	Ilya Ivashka	187	8
ESP	Oriol Roca Batalla	195	9

- ^{1} Rankings are as of 19 February 2024.

=== Other entrants ===
The following players received wildcards into the singles main draw:

- (Spain) Martín Landaluce
- (Spain) Daniel Mérida
- (United States) Richard Zusman

The following players received entry into the singles main draw as alternates:

- (Italy) Riccardo Bonadio
- (Slovakia) Jozef Kovalík

The following players received entry from the qualifying draw:

- (Italy) Raúl Brancaccio
- (Lebanon) Hady Habib
- (Denmark) August Holmgren
- (Kazakhstan) Mikhail Kukushkin
- (Spain) Carlos López Montagud
- (Spain) Alejandro Moro Cañas

The following player received entry as a lucky loser:

- (United States) Mitchell Krueger

== Champions ==
=== Singles ===
- (Kazakhstan) Mikhail Kukushkin def. (Italy) Matteo Gigante 6–2, 2–0 retired.

=== Doubles ===
- (Netherlands) Sander Arends / (Netherlands) Sem Verbeek def. (Italy) Marco Bortolotti / (Spain) Sergio Martos Gornés 6–4, 6–4.
