= 2024 Tenerife Challenger II – Doubles =

Doubles
- 2024 Tenerife Challenger II

Final
- Champions: (Czech Republic) Petr Nouza (Czech Republic) Patrik Rikl
- Runners-up: (Netherlands) Sander Arends (Netherlands) Sem Verbeek
- Score: 6–4, 4–6, [11–9]

Events
Singles	Doubles
- Tenerife Challenger

Vasil Kirkov and Luis David Martínez were the defending champions but chose not to defend their title.

Petr Nouza and Patrik Rikl won the title after defeating Sander Arends and Sem Verbeek 6–4, 4–6, [11–9] in the final.

== Seeds ==
1. (Netherlands) Sander Arends / (Netherlands) Sem Verbeek (final)
2. (Czech Republic) Roman Jebavý / (Spain) David Vega Hernández (semifinals)
3. (United Kingdom) Scott Duncan / (United Kingdom) Marcus Willis (first round)
4. (United States) Ryan Seggerman / (United States) Patrik Trhac (first round)

== Draw ==
Key

- Q = Qualifier
- WC = Wild card
- LL = Lucky loser
- Alt = Alternate
- ITF = ITF entry
- PR = Protected ranking
- SR = Special ranking
- SE = Special exempt
- JE = Junior exempt
- JR = Junior Accelerator Programme entrant
- CO = College Accelerator Programme entrant
- NG = Next Gen Accelerator Program entrant
- w/o = Walkover
- r = Retired
- d = Defaulted

First round
1	(Netherlands) S Arends (Netherlands) S Verbeek	7^{7}	6
WC	(Italy) R Brancaccio (United States) Richard Zusman	6^{3}	2
(South Korea) J-s Nam (Canada) K Stevenson	7^{7}	7
(Italy) A Giannessi (Argentina) S Rodríguez Taverna	6^{3}	5
3	(United Kingdom) S Duncan (United Kingdom) M Willis	4	6^{8}
(Netherlands) J de Jong (Serbia) I Sabanov	6	7^{10}
(Slovakia) J Kovalík (Hungary) Z Piros	6	6
WC	(Spain) Miguel García (Spain) Kenay Ortiz González	3	2
(Italy) F Agamenone (Italy) F Maestrelli	3	7^{11}	[10]
(Romania) A Jecan (Greece) M Kalovelonis	6	6^{9}	[2]
(Czech Republic) P Nouza (Czech Republic) P Rikl	7^{8}	1	[10]
4	(United States) R Seggerman (United States) P Trhac	6^{6}	6	[7]
(Spain) A Barroso Campos (Spain) P Llamas Ruiz	6	7^{7}
(United States) M Damm (Spain) D Rincón	3	6^{4}
(Italy) M Gigante (Italy) S Travaglia	4	4
2	(Czech Republic) R Jebavý (Spain) D Vega Hernández	6	6

Quarterfinals
1	(Netherlands) S Arends (Netherlands) S Verbeek	6	6
(South Korea) J-s Nam (Canada) K Stevenson	3	2
(Netherlands) J de Jong (Serbia) I Sabanov	w/o
(Slovakia) J Kovalík (Hungary) Z Piros
(Italy) F Agamenone (Italy) F Maestrelli	3	3
(Czech Republic) P Nouza (Czech Republic) P Rikl	6	6
(Spain) A Barroso Campos (Spain) P Llamas Ruiz	3	6	[7]
2	(Czech Republic) R Jebavý (Spain) D Vega Hernández	6	2	[10]

Semifinals
1	(Netherlands) S Arends (Netherlands) S Verbeek	6	1
(Netherlands) J de Jong (Serbia) I Sabanov	4	0^{r}
(Czech Republic) P Nouza (Czech Republic) P Rikl	6	6
2	(Czech Republic) R Jebavý (Spain) D Vega Hernández	4	3

Final
1	(Netherlands) S Arends (Netherlands) S Verbeek	4	6	[9]
(Czech Republic) P Nouza (Czech Republic) P Rikl	6	4	[11]
