= 2025 Tenerife Challenger =

- Date: 3 – 9 February
- Edition: 8th
- Surface: Hard
- Location: Tenerife, Spain

Champions

Singles
- (Spain) Pablo Carreño Busta

Doubles
- (Spain) Íñigo Cervantes / (Spain) Daniel Rincón
- Tenerife Challenger

The 2025 Tenerife Challenger was a professional tennis tournament played on hardcourts. It was the eighth edition of the tournament which was part of the 2025 ATP Challenger Tour. It took place in Tenerife, Spain between 3 and 9 February 2025.

== Singles main-draw entrants ==
=== Seeds ===
Country	Player	Rank^{1}	Seed
GER	Dominik Koepfer	118	1
FIN	Emil Ruusuvuori	141	2
ESP	Pablo Carreño Busta	151	3
POR	Henrique Rocha	161	4
ESP	Alejandro Moro Cañas	163	5
LTU	Vilius Gaubas	192	6
GBR	Jan Choinski	195	7
AUT	Lukas Neumayer	219	8

- ^{1} Rankings are as of 27 January 2025.

=== Other entrants ===
The following players received wildcards into the singles main draw:

- (Spain) Pablo Llamas Ruiz
- (Spain) Iñaki Montes de la Torre
- (Spain) Bernabé Zapata Miralles

The following players received entry from the qualifying draw:

- (Spain) Nicolás Álvarez Varona
- (Argentina) Pedro Cachin
- (Italy) Giovanni Fonio
- (Germany) Christoph Negritu
- (Slovakia) Lukáš Pokorný
- (France) Arthur Reymond

== Champions ==
=== Singles ===
- (Spain) Pablo Carreño Busta def. (Spain) Alejandro Moro Cañas 6–3, 6–2.

=== Doubles ===
- (Spain) Íñigo Cervantes / (Spain) Daniel Rincón def. (Spain) Nicolás Álvarez Varona / (Spain) Iñaki Montes de la Torre 6–2, 6–4.
