= 2025 Tenerife Challenger II =

- Date: 10 – 16 February
- Edition: 9th
- Surface: Hard
- Location: Tenerife, Spain

Champions

Singles
- (Spain) Pablo Carreño Busta

Doubles
- (Peru) Alexander Merino / (Germany) Christoph Negritu
- Tenerife Challenger

The 2025 Tenerife Challenger II was a professional tennis tournament played on hardcourts. It was the ninth edition of the tournament which was part of the 2025 ATP Challenger Tour. It took place in Tenerife, Spain between 10 and 16 February 2025.

== Singles main-draw entrants ==
=== Seeds ===
Country	Player	Rank^{1}	Seed
GER	Dominik Koepfer	113	1
FIN	Emil Ruusuvuori	142	2
ESP	Pablo Carreño Busta	149	3
POR	Henrique Rocha	162	4
ESP	Alejandro Moro Cañas	164	5
ESP	Carlos Taberner	175	6
USA	Eliot Spizzirri	192	7
LTU	Vilius Gaubas	195	8

- ^{1} Rankings are as of 3 February 2025.

=== Other entrants ===
The following players received wildcards into the singles main draw:

- (Spain) Nicolás Álvarez Varona
- (Spain) Pablo Llamas Ruiz
- (Spain) Iñaki Montes de la Torre

The following players received entry into the singles main draw as alternates:

- (Lithuania) Edas Butvilas
- (China) Cui Jie
- (Spain) Pol Martín Tiffon
- (Spain) Daniel Rincón

The following players received entry from the qualifying draw:

- (Argentina) Pedro Cachin
- (Canada) Steven Diez
- (Italy) Giovanni Fonio
- (Austria) Filip Misolic
- (Switzerland) Jakub Paul
- (Luxembourg) Chris Rodesch

== Champions ==
=== Singles ===
- (Spain) Pablo Carreño Busta def. (Austria) Filip Misolic 6–3, 6–2.

=== Doubles ===
- (Peru) Alexander Merino / (Germany) Christoph Negritu def. (Israel) Daniel Cukierman / (United Kingdom) Joshua Paris 2–6, 6–3, [10–8].
