= 2026 Tenerife Challenger =

- Date: 2 – 8 February
- Edition: 10th
- Surface: Hard
- Location: Tenerife, Spain

Champions

Singles
- (Spain) Daniel Mérida

Doubles
- (Jordan) Abdullah Shelbayh / (Spain) David Vega Hernández
- Tenerife Challenger

The 2026 Tenerife Challenger was a professional tennis tournament played on hardcourts. It was the 10th edition of the tournament which was part of the 2026 ATP Challenger Tour. It took place in Tenerife, Spain between 2 and 8 February 2026.

== Singles main-draw entrants ==
=== Seeds ===
Country	Player	Rank^{1}	Seed
ITA	Francesco Maestrelli	141	1
ESP	Daniel Mérida	164	2
ITA	Stefano Travaglia	191	3
ITA	Lorenzo Giustino	211	4
GBR	George Loffhagen	212	5
ESP	Pablo Llamas Ruiz	213	6
USA	Michael Mmoh	228	7
ESP	Alejandro Moro Cañas	246	8

- ^{1} Rankings are as of 19 January 2026.

=== Other entrants ===
The following players received wildcards into the singles main draw:

- (Spain) Sergio Callejón Hernando
- (Spain) Pol Martín Tiffon
- (Italy) Jacopo Vasamì

The following player received entry into the singles main draw through the Junior Accelerator programme:

- (United States) Benjamin Willwerth

The following players received entry into the singles main draw as alternates:

- (Spain) Javier Barranco Cosano
- (Uzbekistan) Sergey Fomin
- Alibek Kachmazov
- (Italy) Gabriele Piraino

The following players received entry from the qualifying draw:

- (Spain) Izan Almazán Valiente
- (United States) Dali Blanch
- (Italy) Andrea Colombo
- (France) Thomas Faurel
- (Spain) Alejo Sánchez Quílez
- (Finland) Iiro Vasa

== Champions ==
=== Singles ===
- (Spain) Daniel Mérida def. (Italy) Francesco Maestrelli 6–2, 6–4.

=== Doubles ===
- (Jordan) Abdullah Shelbayh / (Spain) David Vega Hernández def. (Spain) Pablo Llamas Ruiz / (Spain) Benjamín Winter López 6–2, 6–4.
