= 2023 Tenerife Challenger III =

- Date: 6 – 12 February
- Edition: 4th
- Surface: Hard
- Location: Tenerife, Spain

Champions

Singles
- (Italy) Matteo Gigante

Doubles
- (Australia) Andrew Harris / (United States) Christian Harrison
- Tenerife Challenger

The 2023 Tenerife Challenger III was a professional tennis tournament played on hardcourts. It was the fourth edition of the Tenerife Challenger tournament which was part of the 2023 ATP Challenger Tour. It took place in Tenerife, Spain between 6 and 12 February 2023.

== Singles main-draw entrants ==
=== Seeds ===
Country	Player	Rank^{1}	Seed
ITA	Francesco Passaro	111	1
	Alexander Shevchenko	117	2
AUT	Filip Misolic	145	3
ITA	Raúl Brancaccio	147	4
GBR	Ryan Peniston	154	5
UKR	Oleksii Krutykh	176	6
ESP	Carlos Taberner	177	7
ITA	Francesco Maestrelli	183	8

- ^{1} Rankings are as of 30 January 2023.

=== Other entrants ===
The following players received wildcards into the singles main draw:

- (Spain) Pablo Llamas Ruiz
- (Spain) Daniel Rincón
- (Italy) Stefano Travaglia

The following players received entry into the singles main draw as alternates:

- (Czech Republic) Marek Gengel
- (Italy) Gianluca Mager

The following players received entry from the qualifying draw:

- (Italy) Salvatore Caruso
- (Italy) Giovanni Fonio
- (United States) Christian Harrison
- (Japan) Shintaro Mochizuki
- (Jordan) Abedallah Shelbayh
- (China) Bu Yunchaokete

The following players received entry as lucky losers:

- (Italy) Matteo Gigante
- (Brazil) Oscar José Gutierrez
- (Italy) Gian Marco Moroni

== Champions ==
=== Singles ===
- (Italy) Matteo Gigante def. (Italy) Stefano Travaglia 6–3, 6–2.

=== Doubles ===
- (Australia) Andrew Harris / (United States) Christian Harrison def. (United Kingdom) Luke Johnson / (Netherlands) Sem Verbeek 7–6^{(8–6)}, 6–7^{(4–7)}, [10–8].
