= 2024 Tenerife Challenger =

- Date: 15 – 21 January
- Edition: 5th
- Surface: Hard
- Location: Tenerife, Spain

Champions

Singles
- (United States) Brandon Nakashima

Doubles
- (United States) Vasil Kirkov / (Venezuela) Luis David Martínez
- Tenerife Challenger

The 2024 Tenerife Challenger was a professional tennis tournament played on hardcourts. It was the fifth edition of the tournament which was part of the 2024 ATP Challenger Tour. It took place in Tenerife, Spain between 15 and 21 January 2024.

== Singles main-draw entrants ==
=== Seeds ===
Country	Player	Rank^{1}	Seed
ITA	Fabio Fognini	105	1
ESP	Pedro Martínez	114	2
FRA	Benoît Paire	117	3
USA	Brandon Nakashima	128	4
BRA	Felipe Meligeni Alves	153	5
ESP	Pablo Llamas Ruiz	162	6
FIN	Otto Virtanen	168	7
FRA	Antoine Escoffier	170	8

- ^{1} Rankings are as of 8 January 2024.

=== Other entrants ===
The following players received wildcards into the singles main draw:

- (Italy) Fabio Fognini
- (Spain) Martín Landaluce
- (Spain) Pol Martín Tiffon

The following players received entry from the qualifying draw:

- (Spain) Javier Barranco Cosano
- (Netherlands) Guy den Ouden
- (Belgium) Michael Geerts
- (France) Valentin Royer
- (Italy) Samuel Vincent Ruggeri
- (Kazakhstan) Denis Yevseyev

== Champions ==
=== Singles ===
- (United States) Brandon Nakashima def. (Spain) Pedro Martínez 6–3, 6–4.

=== Doubles ===
- (United States) Vasil Kirkov / (Venezuela) Luis David Martínez def. (Poland) Karol Drzewiecki / (Poland) Piotr Matuszewski 3–6, 6–4, [10–3].
