= 2023 Tenerife Challenger II – Singles =

Singles
- 2023 Tenerife Challenger II

Final
- Champion: (Italy) Matteo Arnaldi
- Runner-up: (Italy) Raúl Brancaccio
- Score: 6–1, 6–2

Events
Singles	Doubles
← 2023 ·	Tenerife Challenger	· 2023 →

Alexander Shevchenko was the defending champion but withdrew before his first round match.

Matteo Arnaldi won the title after defeating Raúl Brancaccio 6–1, 6–2 in the final.

== Seeds ==
1. (Italy) Francesco Passaro (second round)
2. (Italy) Matteo Arnaldi (champion)
3. (Italy) Raúl Brancaccio (final)
4. (Austria) Filip Misolic (second round)
5. (United Kingdom) Ryan Peniston (second round)
6. Alexander Shevchenko (withdrew)
7. (Spain) Carlos Taberner (quarterfinals)
8. (France) Benoît Paire (first round)

== Draw ==
=== Key ===
- Q = Qualifier
- WC = Wild card
- LL = Lucky loser
- Alt = Alternate
- SE = Special exempt
- PR = Protected ranking
- ITF = ITF entry
- JE = Junior exempt
- w/o = Walkover
- r = Retired
- d = Defaulted
- SR = Special ranking

=== Finals ===
Semifinals
(South Africa) Lloyd Harris
3	(Italy) Raúl Brancaccio	w/o
WC	(Spain) Nicolás Álvarez Varona	3	4
2	(Italy) Matteo Arnaldi	6	6

Final
3	(Italy) Raúl Brancaccio	1	2
2	(Italy) Matteo Arnaldi	6	6

=== Top half ===
First round
1	(Italy) F Passaro	2	6	6
Y Demin	6	3	4
I Gakhov	0	4
(South Africa) L Harris	6	6
PR	(Italy) R Marcora	7^{7}	6
(Serbia) M Zekić	6^{3}	4
(Argentina) S Rodríguez Taverna	6	6
8	(France) B Paire	2	4
3	(Italy) R Brancaccio	0	7	6
(Serbia) N Milojević	6	5	2
Q	(United Kingdom) D Cox	7^{7}	3	6
(Italy) G Mager	6^{3}	6	2
WC	(Spain) M Landaluce	5	4
(Italy) R Bonadio	7	6
Q	(Italy) GM Moroni	5	3
7	(Spain) C Taberner	7	6

Second round
1	(Italy) F Passaro	6	4	5
(South Africa) L Harris	3	6	7
PR	(Italy) R Marcora	1	7	6
(Argentina) S Rodríguez Taverna	6	5	3
3	(Italy) R Brancaccio	6	6
Q	(United Kingdom) D Cox	3	3
(Italy) R Bonadio	4	0
7	(Spain) C Taberner	6	6

Quarterfinals
(South Africa) L Harris	7^{7}	6
PR	(Italy) R Marcora	6^{4}	3
3	(Italy) R Brancaccio	6	6^{6}	6
7	(Spain) C Taberner	3	7^{8}	0

Semifinals
(South Africa) L Harris
3	(Italy) R Brancaccio	w/o

=== Bottom half ===
First round
5	(United Kingdom) R Peniston	3	7	7^{7}
(United Kingdom) J Clarke	6	5	6^{5}
WC	(Spain) N Álvarez Varona	6	7
WC	(Italy) S Caruso	3	5
Q	(Spain) A Moro Cañas	7	6
(Italy) F Maestrelli	5	1
(Germany) C-M Stebe	1	1
4	(Austria) F Misolic	6	6
LL	(Italy) L Giustino	2	0
(Ukraine) O Krutykh	6	6
(Czech Republic) L Rosol	1	7	6^{3}
Q	(France) V Royer	6	5	7^{7}
Q	(Italy) M Gigante	4	6	1
Q	(Japan) S Mochizuki	6	2	6
Alt	(Italy) A Giannessi	3	7^{7}	3
2	(Italy) M Arnaldi	6	6^{5}	6

Second round
5	(United Kingdom) R Peniston	7	2	1
WC	(Spain) N Álvarez Varona	5	6	6
Q	(Spain) A Moro Cañas	7	7
4	(Austria) F Misolic	5	5
(Ukraine) O Krutykh	6	6^{5}	6
Q	(France) V Royer	4	7^{7}	3
Q	(Japan) S Mochizuki	0	6	3
2	(Italy) M Arnaldi	6	2	6

Quarterfinals
WC	(Spain) N Álvarez Varona	1	6	6
Q	(Spain) A Moro Cañas	6	2	3
(Ukraine) O Krutykh	4	1
2	(Italy) M Arnaldi	6	6

Semifinals
WC	(Spain) N Álvarez Varona	3	4
2	(Italy) M Arnaldi	6	6
