= 2024 Tenerife Challenger – Singles =

Singles
- 2024 Tenerife Challenger

Final
- Champion: (United States) Brandon Nakashima
- Runner-up: (Spain) Pedro Martínez
- Score: 6–3, 6–4

Events
Singles	Doubles
- Tenerife Challenger

Matteo Gigante was the defending champion but chose not to defend his title.

Brandon Nakashima won the title after defeating Pedro Martínez 6–3, 6–4 in the final.

== Seeds ==
1. (Italy) Fabio Fognini (second round)
2. (Spain) Pedro Martínez (final)
3. (France) Benoît Paire (first round)
4. (United States) Brandon Nakashima (champion)
5. (Brazil) Felipe Meligeni Alves (second round)
6. (Spain) Pablo Llamas Ruiz (quarterfinals)
7. (Finland) Otto Virtanen (second round)
8. (France) Antoine Escoffier (first round)

== Draw ==
Key

- Q = Qualifier
- WC = Wild card
- LL = Lucky loser
- Alt = Alternate
- ITF = ITF entry
- PR = Protected ranking
- SR = Special ranking
- SE = Special exempt
- JE = Junior exempt
- JR = Junior Accelerator Programme entrant
- CO = College Accelerator Programme entrant
- NG = Next Gen Accelerator Program entrant
- w/o = Walkover
- r = Retired
- d = Defaulted

=== Finals ===
Semifinals
Q	(Kazakhstan) Denis Yevseyev	6^{6}	2
4	(United States) Brandon Nakashima	7^{8}	6
Q	(Spain) Javier Barranco Cosano	1	1
2	(Spain) Pedro Martínez	6	6

Final
4	(United States) Brandon Nakashima	6	6
2	(Spain) Pedro Martínez	3	4

=== Top half ===
First round
1/WC	(Italy) F Fognini	6^{7}	6	6
(France) M Martineau	7^{9}	3	1
Q	(Kazakhstan) D Yevseyev	6	4
(Switzerland) L Riedi	4	1^{r}
Q	(Italy) Samuel Vincent Ruggeri	6	6
(France) M Janvier	3	3
Q	(Netherlands) G den Ouden	6	6
8	(France) A Escoffier	3	3
4	(United States) B Nakashima	6	2	7^{7}
WC	(Spain) M Landaluce	2	6	6^{1}
WC	(Spain) P Martín Tiffon	6^{3}	5
(Spain) A Moro Cañas	7^{7}	7
(Spain) D Rincón	3	4
(Italy) F Maestrelli	6	6
(Jordan) A Shelbayh	4	6^{6}
7	(Finland) O Virtanen	6	7^{8}

Second round
1/WC	(Italy) F Fognini	3	6	3
Q	(Kazakhstan) D Yevseyev	6	1	6
Q	(Italy) S Vincent Ruggeri	6	6^{5}	6
Q	(Netherlands) G den Ouden	0	7^{7}	2
4	(United States) B Nakashima	6	6
(Spain) A Moro Cañas	3	1
(Italy) F Maestrelli	6	6
7	(Finland) O Virtanen	4	1

Quarterfinals
Q	(Kazakhstan) D Yevseyev	6	6
Q	(Italy) S Vincent Ruggeri	3	4
4	(United States) B Nakashima	6	7^{7}
(Italy) F Maestrelli	4	6^{5}

Semifinals
Q	(Kazakhstan) D Yevseyev	6^{6}	2
4	(United States) B Nakashima	7^{8}	6

=== Bottom half ===
First round
5	(Brazil) F Meligeni Alves	3	6	6
(Bulgaria) D Kuzmanov	6	3	2
(Italy) R Brancaccio	6^{4}	1^{r}
Q	(Spain) J Barranco Cosano	7^{7}	3
(United States) M Damm	4	6^{2}
(Kazakhstan) M Kukushkin	6	7^{7}
(France) G Blancaneaux	6	5	6
3	(France) B Paire	3	7	2
6	(Spain) P Llamas Ruiz	7^{7}	6
A Kachmazov	6^{5}	4
(Bulgaria) A Andreev	6	6
Q	(France) V Royer	1	1
(Lithuania) R Berankis	6	6
(Italy) F Agamenone	2	2
Q	(Belgium) M Geerts	6^{3}	6^{5}
2	(Spain) P Martínez	7^{7}	7^{7}

Second round
5	(Brazil) F Meligeni Alves	3	7^{7}	3
Q	(Spain) J Barranco Cosano	6	6^{5}	6
(Kazakhstan) M Kukushkin	7^{7}	7^{7}
(France) G Blancaneaux	6^{4}	6^{5}
6	(Spain) P Llamas Ruiz	6	6
(Bulgaria) A Andreev	1	4
(Lithuania) R Berankis	2	2
2	(Spain) P Martínez	6	6

Quarterfinals
Q	(Spain) J Barranco Cosano	6	6
(Kazakhstan) M Kukushkin	1	1
6	(Spain) P Llamas Ruiz	4	2
2	(Spain) P Martínez	6	6

Semifinals
Q	(Spain) J Barranco Cosano	1	1
2	(Spain) P Martínez	6	6
