= 2021 Tenerife Challenger =

- Date: 1–7 November
- Edition: 1st
- Surface: Hard
- Location: Tenerife, Spain

Champions

Singles
- (Netherlands) Tallon Griekspoor

Doubles
- (Portugal) Nuno Borges / (Portugal) Francisco Cabral
- Tenerife Challenger

The 2021 Tenerife Challenger was a professional tennis tournament played on hard courts. It was the first edition of the tournament which was part of the 2021 ATP Challenger Tour. It took place in Tenerife, Spain between 1 and 7 November 2021.

== Singles main-draw entrants ==
=== Seeds ===
Country	Player	Rank^{1}	Seed
NED	Tallon Griekspoor	89	1
ESP	Feliciano López	109	2
ESP	Fernando Verdasco	144	3
FRA	Quentin Halys	148	4
ECU	Emilio Gómez	149	5
TUR	Altuğ Çelikbilek	164	6
SWE	Elias Ymer	168	7
POR	João Sousa	173	8

- ^{1} Rankings are as of 25 October 2021.

=== Other entrants ===
The following players received wildcards into the singles main draw:

- (Spain) Feliciano López
- (Spain) Daniel Rincón
- (Spain) Fernando Verdasco

The following player received entry into the singles main draw using a protected ranking:

- (Belgium) Joris De Loore

The following players received entry from the qualifying draw:

- (Russia) Yan Bondarevskiy
- (Romania) David Ionel
- (Ukraine) Vladyslav Orlov
- (Russia) Alexander Shevchenko

The following player received entry as a lucky loser:

- (Romania) Filip Jianu

== Champions ==
=== Singles ===
- (Netherlands) Tallon Griekspoor def. (Spain) Feliciano López 6–4, 6–4.

=== Doubles ===
- (Portugal) Nuno Borges / (Portugal) Francisco Cabral def. (India) Jeevan Nedunchezhiyan / (India) Purav Raja 6–3, 6–4.
