= 2023 Tenerife Challenger II =

- Date: 30 January – 5 February
- Edition: 3rd
- Surface: Hard
- Location: Tenerife, Spain

Champions

Singles
- (Italy) Matteo Arnaldi

Doubles
- (United States) Christian Harrison / (Japan) Shintaro Mochizuki
- Tenerife Challenger

The 2023 Tenerife Challenger II was a professional tennis tournament played on hardcourts. It was the third edition of the tournament which was part of the 2023 ATP Challenger Tour. It took place in Tenerife, Spain between 30 January and 5 February 2023.

== Singles main-draw entrants ==
=== Seeds ===
| Country | Player | Rank^{1} | Seed |
|---|---|---|---|
| ITA | Francesco Passaro | 120 | 1 |
| ITA | Matteo Arnaldi | 134 | 2 |
| ITA | Raúl Brancaccio | 145 | 3 |
| AUT | Filip Misolic | 148 | 4 |
| GBR | Ryan Peniston | 149 | 5 |
| | ~~Alexander Shevchenko~~ | ~~157~~ | ~~6~~ |
| ESP | Carlos Taberner | 170 | 7 |
| FRA | Benoît Paire | 172 | 8 |

- ^{1} Rankings are as of 16 January 2023.

=== Other entrants ===
The following players received wildcards into the singles main draw:

- (Spain) Nicolás Álvarez Varona
- (Italy) Salvatore Caruso
- (Spain) Martín Landaluce

The following player received entry into the singles main draw using a protected ranking:

- (Italy) Roberto Marcora

The following player received entry into the singles main draw as an alternate:

- (Italy) Alessandro Giannessi

The following players received entry from the qualifying draw:

- (United Kingdom) Daniel Cox
- (Italy) Matteo Gigante
- (Japan) Shintaro Mochizuki
- (Spain) Alejandro Moro Cañas
- (Italy) Gian Marco Moroni
- (France) Valentin Royer

The following player received entry as a lucky loser:

- (Italy) Lorenzo Giustino

== Champions ==
=== Singles ===
- (Italy) Matteo Arnaldi def. (Italy) Raúl Brancaccio 6–1, 6–2.

=== Doubles ===
- (United States) Christian Harrison / (Japan) Shintaro Mochizuki def. (Italy) Matteo Gigante / (Italy) Francesco Passaro 6–4, 6–3.
