= 2021 Tenerife Challenger – Singles =

Singles
- 2021 Tenerife Challenger

Final
- Champion: (Netherlands) Tallon Griekspoor
- Runner-up: (Spain) Feliciano López
- Score: 6–4, 6–4

Events
Singles	Doubles
- Tenerife Challenger

This was the first edition of the tournament.

Tallon Griekspoor won the title after defeating Feliciano López 6–4, 6–4 in the final.

== Seeds ==
1. (Netherlands) Tallon Griekspoor (champion)
2. (Spain) Feliciano López (final)
3. (Spain) Fernando Verdasco (semifinals)
4. (France) Quentin Halys (second round)
5. (Ecuador) Emilio Gómez (first round)
6. (Turkey) Altuğ Çelikbilek (quarterfinals)
7. (Sweden) Elias Ymer (second round)
8. (Portugal) João Sousa (quarterfinals)

== Draw ==
Key

- Q = Qualifier
- WC = Wild card
- LL = Lucky loser
- Alt = Alternate
- ITF = ITF entry
- PR = Protected ranking
- SR = Special ranking
- SE = Special exempt
- JE = Junior exempt
- JR = Junior Accelerator Programme entrant
- CO = College Accelerator Programme entrant
- NG = Next Gen Accelerator Program entrant
- w/o = Walkover
- r = Retired
- d = Defaulted

=== Finals ===
Semifinals
1	(Netherlands) Tallon Griekspoor	7^{7}	6^{7}	6
3/WC	(Spain) Fernando Verdasco	6^{5}	7^{9}	3
(Russia) Andrey Kuznetsov	1	6^{3}
2/WC	(Spain) Feliciano López	6	7^{7}

Final
1	(Netherlands) Tallon Griekspoor	6	6
2/WC	(Spain) Feliciano López	4	4

=== Top half ===
First round
1	(Netherlands) T Griekspoor	6	6
(Turkey) E Kırkın	2	2
(Australia) M Polmans	7	3	0
Q	(Russia) Yan Bondarevskiy	5	6	6
(United Kingdom) J Clarke	2	6^{5}
(Chinese Taipei) C-h Tseng	6	7^{7}
(Kazakhstan) T Skatov	3	0
6	(Turkey) A Çelikbilek	6	6
3/WC	(Spain) F Verdasco	6	5	6
(Italy) GM Moroni	1	7	2
WC	(Spain) D Rincón	3	5
(Italy) L Giustino	6	7
(Portugal) N Borges	1	6	6
(Belgium) K Coppejans	6	2	2
(Japan) H Moriya	6^{4}	4
7	(Sweden) E Ymer	7^{7}	6

Second round
1	(Netherlands) T Griekspoor	6	6
Q	(Russia) Y Bondarevskiy	4	4
(Chinese Taipei) C-h Tseng	7	3	6^{3}
6	(Turkey) A Çelikbilek	5	6	7^{7}
3/WC	(Spain) F Verdasco	6	6
(Italy) L Giustino	2	2
(Portugal) N Borges	7	6
7	(Sweden) E Ymer	5	4

Quarterfinals
1	(Netherlands) T Griekspoor	6	7
6	(Turkey) A Çelikbilek	3	5
3/WC	(Spain) F Verdasco	6	7^{7}
(Portugal) N Borges	3	6^{3}

Semifinals
1	(Netherlands) T Griekspoor	7^{7}	6^{7}	6
3/WC	(Spain) F Verdasco	6^{5}	7^{9}	3

=== Bottom half ===
First round
8	(Portugal) J Sousa	5	6	7^{7}
Q	(Ukraine) V Orlov	7	3	6^{1}
(Italy) T Fabbiano	2	6	4
(France) M Guinard	6	3	6
(Russia) A Kuznetsov	6	6
LL	(Romania) FC Jianu	4	2
Q	(Russia) A Shevchenko	7^{7}	4	2
4	(France) Q Halys	6^{4}	6	6
5	(Ecuador) E Gómez	5	4
(Belgium) M Geerts	7	6
(United Kingdom) R Peniston	5	6	6
PR	(Belgium) J De Loore	7	3	3
(Portugal) F Ferreira Silva	6	6
Q	(Romania) ND Ionel	1	0
(Czech Republic) D Svrčina	4	6	4
2/WC	(Spain) F López	6	1	6

Second round
8	(Portugal) J Sousa	7	6
(France) M Guinard	5	0
(Russia) A Kuznetsov	6	7^{8}
4	(France) Q Halys	3	6^{6}
(Belgium) M Geerts	5	6	6^{3}
(United Kingdom) R Peniston	7	4	7^{7}
(Portugal) F Ferreira Silva	6^{3}	3
2/WC	(Spain) F López	7^{7}	6

Quarterfinals
8	(Portugal) J Sousa	6^{6}	3
(Russia) A Kuznetsov	7^{8}	6
(United Kingdom) R Peniston	2	7^{7}	1
2/WC	(Spain) F López	6	6^{5}	6

Semifinals
(Russia) A Kuznetsov	1	6^{3}
2/WC	(Spain) F López	6	7^{7}
