= 2025 Tenerife Challenger – Doubles =

Doubles
- 2025 Tenerife Challenger

Final
- Champions: (Spain) Íñigo Cervantes (Spain) Daniel Rincón
- Runners-up: (Spain) Nicolás Álvarez Varona (Spain) Iñaki Montes de la Torre
- Score: 6–2, 6–4

Events
Singles	Doubles
- Tenerife Challenger

Sander Arends and Sem Verbeek were the defending champions but chose not to defend their title.

Íñigo Cervantes and Daniel Rincón won the title after defeating Nicolás Álvarez Varona and Iñaki Montes de la Torre 6–2, 6–4 in the final.

== Seeds ==
1. (Italy) Marco Bortolotti / (Venezuela) Luis David Martínez (semifinals)
2. (Serbia) Ivan Sabanov / (Serbia) Matej Sabanov (first round)
3. (Lebanon) Benjamin Hassan / (Spain) David Vega Hernández (quarterfinals)
4. (Spain) Íñigo Cervantes / (Spain) Daniel Rincón (champions)

== Draw ==
Key

- Q = Qualifier
- WC = Wild card
- LL = Lucky loser
- Alt = Alternate
- ITF = ITF entry
- PR = Protected ranking
- SR = Special ranking
- SE = Special exempt
- JE = Junior exempt
- JR = Junior Accelerator Programme entrant
- CO = College Accelerator Programme entrant
- NG = Next Gen Accelerator Program entrant
- w/o = Walkover
- r = Retired
- d = Defaulted

=== Draw ===
First round
1	(Italy) M Bortolotti (Venezuela) LD Martínez	6	6
(Spain) J Barranco Cosano (Italy) Augusto Virgili	4	2
(United Kingdom) J Choinski (Austria) L Neumayer	6	1	[5]
(Ecuador) A Andrade (Jordan) A Shelbayh	3	6	[10]
4	(Spain) Í Cervantes (Spain) D Rincón	7^{7}	3	[10]
(Peru) I Buse (Portugal) H Rocha	6^{2}	6	[8]
(Spain) P Martín Tiffon (Italy) G Ricca	6	7
WC	(Spain) D Marrero (United States) Dhruva Mulye	3	5
WC	(Spain) N Álvarez Varona (Spain) I Montes de la Torre	6	5	[10]
I Liutarevich (France) L Sanchez	4	7	[8]
(Spain) P Carreño Busta (Spain) P Llamas Ruiz
3	(Lebanon) B Hassan (Spain) D Vega Hernández	w/o
(Peru) A Merino (Germany) C Negritu	6	6
(Lithuania) E Butvilas (Lithuania) V Gaubas	4	4
(United Kingdom) S Duncan (Romania) A Jecan	6	3	[10]
2	(Serbia) I Sabanov (Serbia) M Sabanov	3	6	[5]

Quarterfinals
1	(Italy) M Bortolotti (Venezuela) LD Martínez	6	6^{1}	[10]
(Ecuador) A Andrade (Jordan) A Shelbayh	3	7^{7}	[7]
4	(Spain) Í Cervantes (Spain) D Rincón	w/o
(Spain) P Martín Tiffon (Italy) G Ricca
WC	(Spain) N Álvarez Varona (Spain) I Montes de la Torre	6	2	[11]
3	(Lebanon) B Hassan (Spain) D Vega Hernández	4	6	[9]
(Peru) A Merino (Germany) C Negritu	5	2
(United Kingdom) S Duncan (Romania) A Jecan	7	6

Semifinals
1	(Italy) M Bortolotti (Venezuela) LD Martínez	4	3
4	(Spain) Í Cervantes (Spain) D Rincón	6	6
WC	(Spain) N Álvarez Varona (Spain) I Montes de la Torre	4	6	[10]
(United Kingdom) S Duncan (Romania) A Jecan	6	4	[6]

Final
4	(Spain) Í Cervantes (Spain) D Rincón	6	6
WC	(Spain) N Álvarez Varona (Spain) I Montes de la Torre	2	4
