= 2023 Tenerife Challenger =

- Date: 16–22 January
- Edition: 2nd
- Surface: Hard
- Location: Tenerife, Spain

Champions

Singles
- Alexander Shevchenko

Doubles
- (Romania) Victor Vlad Cornea / (Spain) Sergio Martos Gornés
- Tenerife Challenger

The 2023 Tenerife Challenger was a professional tennis tournament played on hardcourts. It was the second edition of the tournament which was part of the 2023 ATP Challenger Tour. It took place in Tenerife, Spain between 16 and 22 January 2023.

== Singles main-draw entrants ==
=== Seeds ===
Country	Player	Rank^{1}	Seed
MDA	Radu Albot	100	1
ITA	Francesco Passaro	120	2
CRO	Borna Gojo	124	3
FRA	Manuel Guinard	151	4
	Alexander Shevchenko	158	5
ITA	Luca Nardi	160	6
ITA	Flavio Cobolli	164	7
ESP	Carlos Taberner	170	8

- ^{1} Rankings are as of 9 January 2023.

=== Other entrants ===
The following players received wildcards into the singles main draw:

- (Italy) Matteo Gigante
- (Spain) Alejandro Moro Cañas
- (Spain) Nikolás Sánchez Izquierdo

The following players received entry from the qualifying draw:

- (United States) Ulises Blanch
- (Germany) Lucas Gerch
- (Italy) Lorenzo Giustino
- (Latvia) Ernests Gulbis
- (Austria) Lukas Neumayer
- (Hungary) Máté Valkusz

== Champions ==
=== Singles ===
- Alexander Shevchenko def. (Austria) Sebastian Ofner 7–5, 6–2.

=== Doubles ===
- (Romania) Victor Vlad Cornea / (Spain) Sergio Martos Gornés def. (Finland) Patrik Niklas-Salminen / (Netherlands) Bart Stevens 6–3, 6–4.
