= Hillel Rousseau =

Haitian-American tennis player

- Country (sports): Haiti (–2022); United States (2022–present)
- Born: 16 June 1995 (age 30); Miami, United States
- Height: 1.80 m (5 ft 11 in)
- Plays: Right-handed (one-handed backhand)
- Prize money: $4,070

Singles
- Career record: 0–4 (at ATP Tour level, Grand Slam level, and in Davis Cup)
- Career titles: 0
- Highest ranking: No. 1485 (23 May 2022)
- Current ranking: No. 1485 (23 May 2022)

Doubles
- Career record: 0–0 (at ATP Tour level, Grand Slam level, and in Davis Cup)
- Career titles: 0
- Highest ranking: No. 1097 (9 May 2022)
- Current ranking: No. 1102 (23 May 2022)
- Last updated on: 23 May 2022.

Hans Hillel Rousseau (born 16 June 1995) is a Haitian-American tennis player.

Rousseau has a career high ATP singles ranking of 1485 achieved on 23 May 2022. He also has a career high ATP doubles ranking of 1097 achieved on 9 May 2022.

Rousseau represented Haiti at the Davis Cup, where he has a W/L record of 0–4. Rousseau also survived the 2010 Haiti earthquake and helped lead Felix Varela Senior High School to success.
