= Stefano Travaglia =

Italian tennis player (born 1991)

- Travaglia at the 2026 Wimbledon Championships
- Country (sports): Italy
- Residence: Foligno, Italy
- Born: 18 December 1991 (age 34) Ascoli Piceno, Italy
- Height: 1.85 m (6 ft 1 in)
- Turned pro: 2008
- Plays: Right-handed (two–handed backhand)
- Coach: Francesco Aldi, Giuseppe Fischietti, Giulio Rubini
- Prize money: US $2,833,512

Singles
- Career record: 32–57 (at ATP Tour level, Grand Slam level, and in Davis Cup)
- Career titles: 0
- Highest ranking: No. 60 (8 February 2021)
- Current ranking: No. 147 (31 August 2026)

Grand Slam singles results
- Australian Open: 2R (2019)
- French Open: 3R (2020)
- Wimbledon: 1R (2017, 2018, 2021)
- US Open: 2R (2017)

Doubles
- Career record: 9–21 (at ATP Tour level, Grand Slam level, and in Davis Cup)
- Career titles: 0
- Highest ranking: No. 224 (31 January 2022)
- Current ranking: No. 676 (31 August 2026)

Grand Slam doubles results
- Australian Open: 2R (2021)
- French Open: 1R (2020, 2021)
- Wimbledon: 2R (2021)
- US Open: 1R (2021)
- Last updated on: 31 August 2026.

Stefano Travaglia (born 18 December 1991) is an Italian tennis player who currently competes on the ATP Challenger Tour. He has a career-high ATP singles ranking of No. 60, which he reached on 8 February 2021 and a career-high ATP doubles ranking of No. 224 achieved on 31 January 2022.

== Career ==
=== 2014: ATP debut, First Challenger title ===
Travaglia made his ATP main-draw debut at the 2014 Internazionali BNL d'Italia, where he qualified for the main draw by defeating Albert Montañés and Blaž Rola in the qualifying rounds. In the main draw, he put up a good fight against fellow Italian Simone Bolelli in the first round.

Travaglia won his first Challenger title in the doubles event at the 2014 Morocco Tennis Tour – Meknes, partnering Hans Podlipnik-Castillo, defeating Gerard Granollers and Jordi Samper Montaña in the final.

=== 2020: French Open third round ===
Travaglia reached the third round of a Grand Slam at the 2020 French Open for the first time in his career.

=== 2021: First ATP final, Top 60 ===
He reached his first ATP final at the Melbourne tune-up tournament 2021 Great Ocean Road Open to the Australian Open in February 2021. As a result he reached a career-high ranking of World No. 60 on 8 February 2021.

=== 2025: First title in four years ===
Travaglia won his sixth challenger title in Modena, and his first since winning the 2021 Sibiu Open, four years before.

== Performance timelines ==
Key
W	F	SF	QF	#R	RR	Q#	DNQ	A	NH

(W) winner; (F) finalist; (SF) semifinalist; (QF) quarterfinalist; (#R) rounds 4, 3, 2, 1; (RR) round-robin stage; (Q#) qualification round; (DNQ) did not qualify; (A) absent; (NH) not held; (SR) strike rate (events won / competed); (W–L) win–loss record.
To avoid confusion and double counting, these charts are updated at the conclusion of a tournament or when the player's participation has ended.

=== Singles ===
Current through the 2022 Marrakesh.

Tournament	2014	2015	2016	2017	2018	2019	2020	2021	2022	SR	W–L
Grand Slam tournaments
Australian Open	A	Q1	A	A	Q2	2R	1R	1R	1R	0 / 4	1–4
French Open	A	A	A	Q1	Q2	1R	3R	1R	A	0 / 3	2–3
Wimbledon	A	A	A	1R	1R	Q1	NH	1R	Q1	0 / 3	0–3
US Open	Q1	A	A	2R	1R	Q1	1R	1R	Q2	0 / 4	1–4
Win–loss	0–0	0–0	0–0	1–2	0–2	1–2	2–3	0–4	0–1	0 / 14	4–14
National representation
Davis Cup	A	A	A	A	A	A	QF			0 / 1	1–0
ATP Masters 1000
Indian Wells Masters	A	A	A	A	A	A	NH	A		0 / 0	0–0
Miami Open	A	A	A	A	A	A	NH	1R		0 / 1	0–1
Monte-Carlo Masters	A	A	A	A	Q1	A	NH	1R	Q1	0 / 1	0–1
Madrid Open	A	A	A	A	Q1	A	NH	Q2		0 / 0	0–0
Italian Open	1R	A	A	A	A	A	3R	2R		0 / 3	3–3
Canadian Open	A	A	A	A	Q2	A	NH	A		0 / 0	0–0
Cincinnati Masters	A	A	A	A	A	A	Q1	A		0 / 0	0–0
Shanghai Masters	A	A	A	A	A	A	NH			0 / 0	0–0
Paris Masters	A	A	A	A	A	A	1R	Q1		0 / 1	0–1
Win–loss	0–1	0–0	0–0	0–0	0–0	0–0	2–2	1–3	0–0	0 / 6	3–6
Career statistics	2014	2015	2016	2017	2018	2019	2020	2021	2022	SR	W–L
Tournaments	1	0	0	3	7	7	9	20	6	53	
Titles	0	0	0	0	0	0	0	0	0	0	
Finals	0	0	0	0	0	0	0	1	0	1	
Overall win–loss	0–1	0–0	0–0	1–3	3–7	5–7	7–10	11–20	3–6	30–54	
Year-end ranking	198	457	326	134	133	84	74	78	314	36%	

== ATP career finals ==
=== Singles: 1 (1 runner-up) ===
Legend Grand Slam (0–0) ATP Masters 1000 (0–0) ATP 500 series (0–0) ATP 250 series (0–1)	Titles by surface Hard (0–1) Clay (0–0) Grass (0–0)	Titles by setting Outdoor (0–1) Indoor (0–0)

Result	W–L	Date	Tournament	Tier	Surface	Opponent	Score
Loss	0–1	Feb 2021	Great Ocean Road Open, Australia	250 Series	Hard	(Italy) Jannik Sinner	6–7^{(4–7)}, 4–6

== ATP Challenger and ITF Tour finals ==
=== Singles: 41 (26 titles, 15 runner–ups) ===
Legend (singles) ATP Challenger Tour (7–5) ITF Futures Tour (19–10)	Titles by surface Hard (0–3) Clay (26–12)

Result	W–L	Date	Tournament	Tier	Surface	Opponent	Score
Loss	0–1	Aug 2010	Argentina F17, Salta	Futures	Clay	(Argentina) Joaquín-Jesús Monteferrario	6–7^{(3–7)}, 6–3, 6–7^{(12–14)}
Win	1–1	Nov 2010	Chile F6, Rancagua	Futures	Clay	(Chile) Cristóbal Saavedra Corvalán	6–4, 6–1
Loss	1–2	Dec 2010	Chile F9, Concepción	Futures	Clay	(Chile) Cristóbal Saavedra Corvalán	6–7^{(3–7)}, 1–6
Win	2–2	Apr 2011	Chile F1, Viña del Mar	Futures	Clay	(Chile) Guillermo Rivera Aránguiz	6–2, 6–4
Loss	2–3	Apr 2011	Argentina F3, Bell Ville	Futures	Clay	(Argentina) Andrés Molteni	4–6, 4–6
Win	3–3	Jun 2011	Italy F12, Bergamo	Futures	Clay	(Sweden) Christian Lindell	6–2, 6–2
Win	4–3	Oct 2012	Chile F9, Santiago	Futures	Clay	(Chile) Gonzalo Lama	6–3, 6–2
Loss	4–4	Oct 2012	Chile F10, Villa Alemana	Futures	Clay	(Argentina) Patricio Heras	6–2, 4–6, 4–6
Loss	4–5	Sep 2013	Argentina F17, La Rioja	Futures	Clay	(Argentina) Gabriel Alejandro Hidalgo	6–3, 2–6, 5–7
Win	5–5	Feb 2014	Egypt F3, Sharm El Sheikh	Futures	Clay	(Australia) Jason Kubler	6–0, 6–0
Win	6–5	Feb 2014	Egypt F4, Sharm El Sheikh	Futures	Clay	(Brazil) José Pereira	6–2, 6–4
Loss	6–6	Mar 2014	Egypt F8, Sharm El Sheikh	Futures	Clay	(Chile) Hans Podlipnik Castillo	4–6, 6–4, 4–6
Win	7–6	Apr 2014	Italy F9, Santa Margherita di Pula	Futures	Clay	(Spain) Oriol Roca Batalla	7–6^{(7–4)}, 6–3
Win	8–6	Jun 2014	Italy F20, Busto Arsizio	Futures	Clay	(Italy) Roberto Marcora	6–2, 4–6, 6–4
Win	9–6	Sep 2014	Tunisia F5, Carthage	Futures	Clay	(France) Maxime Hamou	6–4, 4–6, 6–3
Win	10–6	Sep 2015	Italy F28, Santa Margherita di Pula	Futures	Clay	(Italy) Filippo Leonardi	7–5, 6–2
Win	11–6	Nov 2015	Morocco F4, Casablanca	Futures	Clay	(France) Maxime Chazal	6–4, 6–4
Win	12–6	Nov 2015	Morocco F5, Casablanca	Futures	Clay	(Portugal) André Gaspar Murta	6–4, 6–3
Loss	12–7	Aug 2016	Serbia F4, Novi Sad	Futures	Clay	(Australia) Christopher O'Connell	6–7^{(6–8)}, 4–6
Win	13–7	Sep 2016	Italy F28, Reggio Emilia	Futures	Clay	(Italy) Matteo Berrettini	w/o
Win	14–7	Sep 2016	Italy F30, Santa Margherita di Pula	Futures	Clay	(Italy) Nicola Ghedin	6–2, 6–3
Loss	14–8	Oct 2016	Italy F32, Santa Margherita di Pula	Futures	Clay	(Germany) Yannick Maden	6–2, 4–6, 3–6
Win	15–8	Oct 2016	Italy F33, Santa Margherita di Pula	Futures	Clay	(Germany) Daniel Altmaier	6–4, 2–6, 6–1
Win	16–8	Nov 2016	Italy F36, Santa Margherita di Pula	Futures	Clay	(Italy) Salvatore Caruso	4–6, 6–2, 6–3
Win	17–8	Feb 2017	Spain F3, Paguera	Futures	Clay	(Spain) Pedro Martínez	7–5, 6–1
Win	18–8	Feb 2017	Tunisia F7, Hammamet	Futures	Clay	(Bosnia and Herzegovina) Tomislav Brkić	6–7^{(7–9)}, 6–3, 6–3
Loss	18–9	Mar 2017	Tunisia F10, Hammamet	Futures	Clay	(Spain) Oriol Roca Batalla	6–7^{(3–7)}, 6–1, 0–6
Win	19–9	Apr 2017	Spain F9, Madrid	Futures	Clay	(Germany) Yannick Maden	6–1, 6–2
Win	20–9	May 2017	Ostrava, Czech Republic	Challenger	Clay	(Italy) Marco Cecchinato	6–2, 3–6, 6–4
Win	21–9	Mar 2018	Marbella, Spain	Challenger	Clay	(Argentina) Guido Andreozzi	6–3, 6–3
Win	22–9	Apr 2019	Francavilla, Italy	Challenger	Clay	(Germany) Oscar Otte	6–3, 6–7^{(3–7)}, 6–3
Loss	22–10	Jun 2019	Shymkent, Kazakhstan	Challenger	Clay	(Slovakia) Andrej Martin	4–6, 4–6
Win	23–10	Aug 2019	Sopot, Poland	Challenger	Clay	(Slovakia) Filip Horanský	6–4, 2–6, 6–2
Loss	23–11	Jan 2020	Bendigo, Australia	Challenger	Hard	(United States) Steve Johnson	6–7^{(2–7)}, 6–7^{(3–7)}
Win	24–11	Oct 2021	Sibiu, Romania	Challenger	Clay	(Australia) Thanasi Kokkinakis	7–6^{(7–4)}, 6–2
Loss	24–12	Feb 2023	Tenerife, Spain	Challenger	Hard	(Italy) Matteo Gigante	3–6, 2–6
Loss	24–13	Mar 2023	M25 Palmanova, Spain	World Tour	Clay	(Netherlands) Max Houkes	6–4, 1–6, 2–6
Loss	24–14	Feb 2024	Tenerife, Spain	Challenger	Hard	(Italy) Matteo Gigante	2–6, 4–6
Win	25–14	Jun 2025	Modena, Italy	Challenger	Clay	(Brazil) Thiago Seyboth Wild	6–4, 6–3
Loss	25–15	Aug 2025	Todi, Italy	Challenger	Clay	(Kazakhstan) Timofey Skatov	7–6^{(7–4)}, 0–6, 6–2
Win	26–15	Mar 2026	Zadar, Croatia	Challenger	Clay	(France) Arthur Géa	2–1, retired

=== Doubles: 19 (12 titles, 7 runner–ups) ===
Legend (doubles) ATP Challenger Tour (2–2) ITF Futures Tour (9–5) World Tennis Tour (1–0)	Titles by surface Hard (0–1) Clay (12–6) Grass (0–0) Carpet (0–0)

Result	W–L	Date	Tournament	Tier	Surface	Partner	Opponents	Score
Win	1–0	Apr 2011	Chile F1, Viña del Mar	Futures	Clay	(Argentina) Renzo Olivo	(Chile) Guillermo Rivera Aránguiz (Chile) Cristóbal Saavedra Corvalán	5–7, 6–3, [10–1]
Loss	1–1	Jul 2011	San Benedetto, Italy	Challenger	Clay	(Italy) Daniele Giorgini	(Italy) Alessio di Mauro (Italy) Alessandro Motti	6–7^{(5–7)}, 6–4, [7–10]
Loss	1–2	Jul 2011	Italy F18, Modena	Futures	Clay	(Italy) Federico Torresi	(Austria) Nikolaus Moser (Austria) Max Raditschnigg	3–6, 4–6
Win	2–2	Aug 2013	Italy F22, Este	Futures	Clay	(Croatia) Mate Delić	(Chile) Jorge Aguilar (Chile) Guillermo Hormazábal	6–0, 6–1
Loss	2–3	Sep 2013	Argentina F17, La Rioja	Futures	Clay	(Argentina) Eduardo Agustín Torre	(Brazil) Daniel Dutra da Silva (Sweden) Christian Lindell	2–6, 6–4, [7–10]
Win	3–3	Sep 2013	Argentina F18, Neuquén	Futures	Clay	(Argentina) Facundo Mena	(Colombia) Juan Manuel Benítez Chavarriaga (Argentina) Juan Pablo Ficovich	6–7^{(5–7)}, 6–1, [10–8]
Loss	3–4	Jan 2014	Egypt F2, Sharm El Sheikh	Futures	Clay	(Italy) Lorenzo Frigerio	(Brazil) José Pereira (France) Tak Khunn Wang	6–1, 3–6, [8–10]
Win	4–4	Feb 2014	Egypt F3, Sharm El Sheikh	Futures	Clay	(Brazil) José Pereira	(Serbia) Miljan Zekić (Serbia) Arsenije Zlatanović	2–6, 6–3, [10–8]
Win	5–4	Apr 2014	Italy F9, Santa Margherita di Pula	Futures	Clay	(Italy) Francesco Borgo	(Spain) Oriol Roca Batalla (Spain) David Vega Hernández	6–4, 7–6^{(7–5)}
Win	6–4	Jul 2014	Italy F23, Modena	Futures	Clay	(Italy) Pietro Rondoni	(Italy) Omar Giacalone (Italy) Gianluca Naso	6–2, 6–4
Win	7–4	Sep 2014	Tunisia F4, Carthage	Futures	Clay	(Italy) Claudio Grassi	(Belgium) Sander Gillé (Greece) Alexandros Jakupovic	6–2, 6–3
Win	8–4	Sep 2014	Meknes, Morocco	Challenger	Clay	(Chile) Hans Podlipnik Castillo	(Spain) Gerard Granollers Pujol (Spain) Jordi Samper Montaña	6–2, 6–7^{(4–7)}, [10–7]
Loss	8–5	Feb 2015	Egypt F4, Sharm El Sheikh	Futures	Hard	(Chinese Taipei) Chen Ti	(Serbia) Ivan Bjelica (Croatia) Matija Pecotić	3–6, 2–6
Win	9–5	Oct 2015	Italy F33, Santa Margherita di Pula	Futures	Clay	(Italy) Francesco Borgo	(Italy) Erik Crepaldi (Italy) Daniele Pepe	6–2, 7–6^{(7–3)}
Win	10–5	Jan 2017	Spain F2, Manacor	Futures	Clay	(Italy) Filippo Leonardi	(Romania) Andrei Ștefan Apostol (Romania) Bogdan Borza	6–3, 6–2
Loss	10–6	Feb 2017	Spain F3, Paguera	Futures	Clay	(Italy) Filippo Leonardi	(Spain) Gerard Granollers Pujol (Spain) Pedro Martínez	1–6, 3–6
Win	11–6	Mar 2023	M25 Palmanova, Spain	WTT	Clay	(Italy) Alexander Weis	(Netherlands) Thiemo de Bakker (Netherlands) Mats Hermans	7–5, 6–3
Loss	11–7	Sep 2023	Braga, Portugal	Challenger	Clay	(Italy) Alexander Weis	(Italy) Marco Bortolotti (Romania) Alexandru Jecan	5–7, 5–7
Win	12–7	May 2025	Vicenza, Italy	Challenger	Clay	(Italy) Federico Bondioli	(Denmark) August Holmgren (Denmark) Johannes Ingildsen	6–2, 6–1

== Top 10 wins ==
- He has a 1–3 (25.0%) record against players who were, at the time the match was played, ranked in the top 10.

Season	2019	Total
Wins	1	1

#	Player	Rank	Event	Surface	Rd	Score	STR
2019
1.	(Italy) Fabio Fognini	No. 9	Croatia Open, Umag	Clay	2R	6–1, 2–1 ret.	No. 105

== Record against top 10 players ==
Travaglia's record against players who have been ranked in the top 10, with those who are active in boldface. Only ATP Tour main draw matches are considered:

Player	Record	Win %	Hard	Clay	Grass	Last match
Number 1 ranked players						
(Spain) **Rafael Nadal**	0–1	0%	–	0–1	–	Lost (1–6, 4–6, 0–6) at 2020 French Open
Number 3 ranked players						
(Spain) David Ferrer	0–1	0%	0–1	–	–	Lost (6–4, 4–6, 6–7^{(3–7)}) at 2017 Antwerp
Number 4 ranked players						
(Japan) **Kei Nishikori**	1–0	100%	–	1–0	–	Won (6–4, 2–6, 7–6^{(9–7)}, 4–6, 6–2) at 2020 French Open
(Czech Republic) Tomas Berdych	0–1	0%	0–1	–	–	Lost (7–5, 6–7^{(4–7)}, 3–6) at 2018 Marseille
(Italy) **Jannik Sinner**	0–1	0%	0–1	–	–	Lost (6–7^{(4–7)}, 4–6) at 2021 Melbourne 1
Number 5 ranked players						
(United States) **Taylor Fritz**	2–0	100%	1–0	1–0	–	Won (6–4, 7–6^{(7–4)}) at 2020 Rome Masters
(Russia) **Andrey Rublev**	0–1	0%	–	–	0–1	Lost (7–6^{(7–3)}, 3–6, 5–7, 6–1, 5–7) at 2017 Wimbledon Championships
Number 6 ranked players						
(Canada) **Félix Auger-Aliassime**	0–1	0%	0–1	–	–	Lost (7–6^{(7–3)}, 6–7^{(6–8)}, 3–6) at 2020 Marseille
(France) Gilles Simon	0–1	0%	–	0–1	–	Lost (6–1, 3–6, 4–6) at 2021 Cagliari
(Italy) **Matteo Berrettini**	0–2	0%	–	0–1	0–1	Lost (6–7^{(5–7)}, 6–7^{(4–7)}) at 2021 London
Number 7 ranked players						
(Belgium) **David Goffin**	0–1	0%	0–1	–	–	Lost (3–6, 2–6) at 2021 Antalya
(Denmark) **Holger Rune**	0–1	0%	–	0–1	–	Lost (3–6, 4–6) at 2021 Kitzbühel
Number 8 ranked players						
(Russia) **Karen Khachanov**	0–1	0%	0–1	–	–	Lost (5–7, 3–6) at 2020 ATP Cup
Number 9 ranked players						
(Italy) **Fabio Fognini**	2–1	67%	1–1	1–0	–	Lost (5–7, 2–6) at 2021 Acapulco
(Poland) **Hubert Hurkacz**	1–1	50%	1–1	–	–	Won (3–6, 6–3, 7–5) at 2021 Melbourne 1
(Spain) **Roberto Bautista Agut**	0–2	0%	0–1	–	0–1	Lost (6–7^{(2–7)}, 4–6, 7–5, 1–6) at 2022 Australian Open
Number 10 ranked players						
(Spain) **Pablo Carreno Busta**	0–1	0%	–	0–1	–	Lost (5–7, 6–7^{(4–7)}) at 2021 Monte Carlo Masters
(Canada) **Denis Shapovalov**	0–1	0%	–	0–1	–	Lost (6–7^{(2–7)}, 3–6) at 2021 Rome Masters
**Total**	**6–18**	**25%**	**3–9** **(25%)**	**3–6** **(33%)**	**0–3** **(0%)**	*** Statistics correct as of 27 March 2022**
