= Pablo Llamas Ruiz =

Spanish tennis player (born 2002)

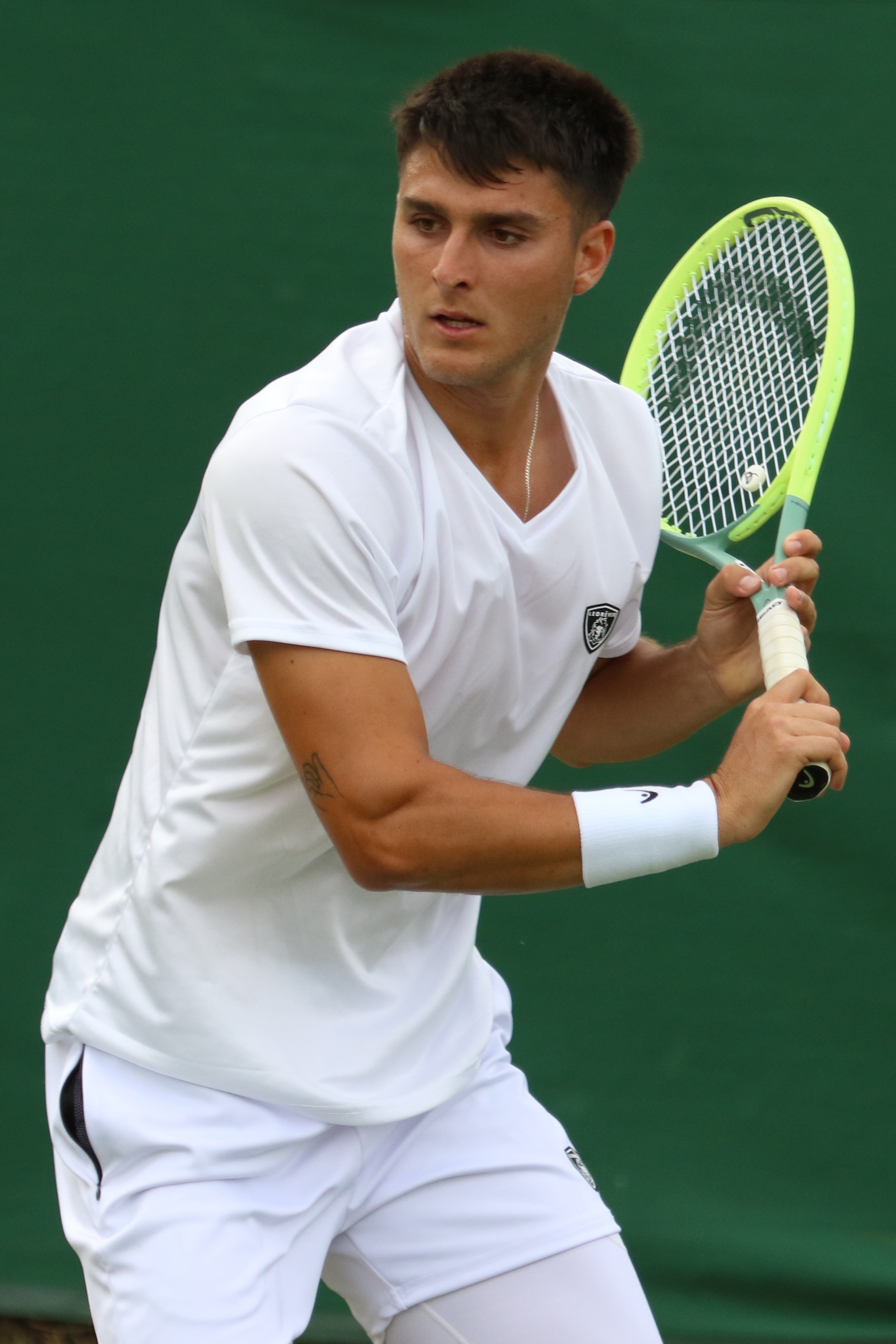
- Llamas Ruiz at the 2023 Wimbledon Championships
- Country (sports): Spain
- Born: 13 October 2002 (age 24) Jerez de la Frontera, Spain
- Height: 1.88 m (6 ft 2 in)
- Plays: Right-handed (two-handed backhand)
- Coach: Juan Pablo Cañas
- Prize money: US $994,402

Singles
- Career record: 8–10
- Career titles: 0
- Highest ranking: No. 116 (13 July 2026)
- Current ranking: No. 129 (27 July 2026)

Grand Slam singles results
- Australian Open: Q2 (2026)
- French Open: 1R (2025, 2026)
- Wimbledon: 1R (2026)
- US Open: 1R (2025)

Doubles
- Career record: 1–1
- Career titles: 0
- Highest ranking: No. 208 (4 May 2026)
- Current ranking: No. 210 (27 July 2026)
- Last updated on: 27 July 2026.

Pablo Llamas Ruiz (born 13 October 2002) is a Spanish tennis player. Llamas Ruiz has a career-high ATP singles ranking of No. 116 achieved on 13 July 2026 and a doubles ranking of No. 208 achieved on 4 May 2026.

== Career ==
=== 2023: ATP debut & first win, Challenger title, top 150 ===
In May, Llamas Ruiz made his ATP Tour debut in Lyon after qualifying for the main draw. He won his first ATP match over Max Purcell. He lost to top seed Félix Auger-Aliassime in straight sets in the second round.

In July, he won his maiden Challenger title at the 2023 Open Castilla y León, defeating Antoine Escoffier in the final.

=== 2024: ATP quarterfinal, Masters debut, hiatus ===
In January, ranked No. 156, Llamas Ruiz qualified in Montpellier and recorded his second ATP win and his first on a hardcourt over Richard Gasquet. He lost to top seed Holger Rune in the second round.

In April, Llamas Ruiz qualified for the 2024 Estoril Open and defeated eighth seed Dominik Koepfer and lucky loser David Jordà Sanchis to reach his first ATP career quarterfinal, where he lost to eventual champion and second seed Hubert Hurkacz. Later that month, he entered the qualifying competition at the 2024 Mutua Madrid Open as an alternate and qualified for his first Masters 1000 main draw with wins over Quentin Halys and second seed Federico Coria.

=== 2025: French & US Open debuts, back to top 250 ===
In May, ranked No. 887, Llamas Ruiz entered the qualifying rounds at the 2025 French Open using his protected ranking and made his Grand Slam tournament main draw debut. He lost to 29th seed Alejandro Davidovich Fokina in the first round.

In July, Llamas Ruiz reached his second quarterfinal on the ATP Tour as a qualifier at the Croatia Open, by defeating seventh seed Kamil Majchrzak in the first round and Térence Atmane in the second round. He returned to the top 250 on 15 September 2025 following his third Challenger final at the 2025 Szczecin Open.

=== 2026: Masters third round, Wimbledon & top 125 debuts ===
At the 2026 Italian Open Llamas Ruiz qualified for the main draw and reached the third round of a Masters 1000 for the first time, with a win over 28th seed Corentin Moutet.

He made his debut at the 2026 Wimbledon Championships as a lucky loser, replacing Mattia Bellucci but lost to Zachary Svajda.

== Performance timeline ==
Key
| W | F | SF | QF | #R | RR | Q# | DNQ | A | NH |

(W) winner; (F) finalist; (SF) semifinalist; (QF) quarterfinalist; (#R) rounds 4, 3, 2, 1; (RR) round-robin stage; (Q#) qualification round; (DNQ) did not qualify; (A) absent; (NH) not held; (SR) strike rate (events won / competed); (W–L) win–loss record.
To avoid confusion and double counting, these charts are updated at the conclusion of a tournament or when the player's participation has ended.

Current through the 2026 Australian Open.

| Tournament | 2023 | 2024 | 2025 | 2026 | SR | W–L | Win% |
|---|---|---|---|---|---|---|---|
Grand Slam tournaments
| Australian Open | A | Q1 | A | Q2 | 0 / 0 | 0–0 | – |
| French Open | A | Q1 | 1R | 1R | 0 / 2 | 0–2 | 0% |
| Wimbledon | Q2 | A | Q1 | 1R | 0 / 1 | 0–1 | 0% |
| US Open | Q2 | A | 1R | | 0 / 1 | 0–1 | – |
| Win–loss | 0–0 | 0–0 | 0–2 | 0–2 | 0 / 4 | 0–4 | 0% |
ATP Masters 1000
| Indian Wells Open | | | | | 0 / 0 | 0–0 | – |
| Miami Open | | | | | 0 / 0 | 0–0 | – |
| Monte-Carlo Masters | | | | | 0 / 0 | 0–0 | – |
| Madrid Open | | 1R | | Q2 | 0 / 1 | 0–1 | 0% |
| Italian Open | | | | 3R | 0 / 1 | 2–1 | 67% |

== ATP Challenger Tour finals ==
=== Singles: 4 (2 titles, 2 runner-ups) ===
Finals by surface
Hard (1–0)
Clay (1–2)

| Result | W–L | Date | Tournament | Surface | Opponent | Score |
|---|---|---|---|---|---|---|
| Loss | 0–1 | Jun 2023 | Vicenza International, Italy | Clay | (Argentina) Francisco Comesaña | 6–3, 2–6, 2–6 |
| Win | 1–1 | Jul 2023 | Open Castilla y León, Spain | Hard | (France) Antoine Escoffier | 7–6^{(11–9)}, 7–6^{(7–5)} |
| Loss | 1–2 | Sep 2025 | Szczecin Open, Poland | Clay | (Argentina) Thiago Agustín Tirante | 3–6, 2–6 |
| Win | 2–2 | Mar 2026 | Montemar Ene Construcción, Spain | Clay | (Spain) Pablo Carreño Busta | 6–4, 6–2 |

=== Doubles: 2 (1 title, 1 runner-up) ===
Finals by surface
Hard (0–1)
Clay (1–0)

| Result | W–L | Date | Tournament | Surface | Partner | Opponents | Score |
|---|---|---|---|---|---|---|---|
| Win | 1–0 | Sep 2025 | Lisboa Belém Open, Portugal | Clay | (Spain) Sergio Martos Gornés | (Romania) Alexandru Jecan (Romania) Bogdan Pavel | 7–6^{(7–5)}, 6–4 |
| Loss | 1–1 | Feb 2026 | Tenerife Challenger, Spain | Hard | (Spain) Benjamín Winter López | (Jordan) Abdullah Shelbayh (Spain) David Vega Hernández | 2–6, 4–6 |
