= Tenerife Challenger =

- 2026 Tenerife Challenger II

ATP Challenger Tour
- Event name: Tenerife Challenger
- Location: Guía de Isora, Tenerife, Spain
- Venue: Abama Tennis Academy
- Category: ATP Challenger Tour
- Surface: Hard
- Draw: 32S/32Q/16D
- Website: Website

The Tenerife Challenger is a professional tennis tournament played on hardcourts. It is currently part of the ATP Challenger Tour. It is held annually in Tenerife, Spain since 2021.

== Past finals ==
=== Singles ===
Year	Champion	Runner-up	Score
2026 (2)	(South Africa) Lloyd Harris	(Spain) Alejandro Moro Cañas	7–5, 7–5
2026 (1)	(Spain) Daniel Mérida	(Italy) Francesco Maestrelli	6–2, 6–4
2025 (2)	(Spain) Pablo Carreño Busta	(Austria) Filip Misolic	6–3, 6–2
2025 (1)	(Spain) Pablo Carreño Busta	(Spain) Alejandro Moro Cañas	6–3, 6–2
2024 (3)	(Kazakhstan) Mikhail Kukushkin	(Italy) Matteo Gigante	6–2, 2–0 ret.
2024 (2)	(Italy) Matteo Gigante	(Italy) Stefano Travaglia	6–2, 6–4
2024 (1)	(United States) Brandon Nakashima	(Spain) Pedro Martínez	6–3, 6–4
2023 (3)	(Italy) Matteo Gigante	(Italy) Stefano Travaglia	6–3, 6–2
2023 (2)	(Italy) Matteo Arnaldi	(Italy) Raúl Brancaccio	6–1, 6–2
2023 (1)	Alexander Shevchenko	(Austria) Sebastian Ofner	7–5, 6–2
2022	Not held		
2021	(Netherlands) Tallon Griekspoor	(Spain) Feliciano López	6–4, 6–4

=== Doubles ===
Year	Champions	Runners-up	Score
2026 (2)	(Czech Republic) Filip Duda (Czech Republic) David Poljak	(Croatia) Luka Mikrut (Portugal) Tiago Pereira	7–6^{(7–0)}, 6–3
2026 (1)	(Jordan) Abdullah Shelbayh (Spain) David Vega Hernández	(Spain) Pablo Llamas Ruiz (Spain) Benjamín Winter López	6–2, 6–4
2025 (2)	(Peru) Alexander Merino (Germany) Christoph Negritu	(Israel) Daniel Cukierman (United Kingdom) Joshua Paris	2–6, 6–3, [10–8]
2025 (1)	(Spain) Íñigo Cervantes (Spain) Daniel Rincón	(Spain) Nicolás Álvarez Varona (Spain) Iñaki Montes de la Torre	6–2, 6–4
2024 (3)	(Netherlands) Sander Arends (Netherlands) Sem Verbeek	(Italy) Marco Bortolotti (Spain) Sergio Martos Gornés	6–4, 6–4
2024 (2)	(Czech Republic) Petr Nouza (Czech Republic) Patrik Rikl	(Netherlands) Sander Arends (Netherlands) Sem Verbeek	6–4, 4–6, [11–9]
2024 (1)	(United States) Vasil Kirkov (Venezuela) Luis David Martínez	(Poland) Karol Drzewiecki (Poland) Piotr Matuszewski	3–6, 6–4, [10–3]
2023 (3)	(Australia) Andrew Harris (United States) Christian Harrison	(United Kingdom) Luke Johnson (Netherlands) Sem Verbeek	7–6^{(8–6)}, 6–7^{(4–7)}, [10–8]
2023 (2)	(United States) Christian Harrison (Japan) Shintaro Mochizuki	(Italy) Matteo Gigante (Italy) Francesco Passaro	6–4, 6–3
2023 (1)	(Romania) Victor Vlad Cornea (Spain) Sergio Martos Gornés	(Finland) Patrik Niklas-Salminen (Netherlands) Bart Stevens	6–3, 6–4
2022	Not held		
2021	(Portugal) Nuno Borges (Portugal) Francisco Cabral	(India) Jeevan Nedunchezhiyan (India) Purav Raja	6–3, 6–4
