= 2026 Open Menorca – Singles =

Singles
- 2026 Open Menorca

Final
- Champion: (Italy) Raúl Brancaccio
- Runner-up: (Spain) Àlex Martínez
- Score: 6–1, 6–4

Events
Singles	Doubles
- Open Menorca

Vilius Gaubas was the defending champion but chose not to defend his title.

Raúl Brancaccio won the title after defeating Àlex Martínez 6–1, 6–4 in the final.

== Seeds ==
1. (France) Valentin Royer (second round)
2. (Austria) Sebastian Ofner (first round, retired)
3. (Spain) Roberto Carballés Baena (second round)
4. (Czech Republic) Zdeněk Kolář (first round)
5. (Germany) Justin Engel (second round)
6. (Portugal) Frederico Ferreira Silva (first round)
7. (Spain) Alejandro Moro Cañas (second round)
8. Ivan Gakhov (second round)

== Draw ==
Key

- Q = Qualifier
- WC = Wild card
- LL = Lucky loser
- Alt = Alternate
- ITF = ITF entry
- PR = Protected ranking
- SR = Special ranking
- SE = Special exempt
- JE = Junior exempt
- JR = Junior Accelerator Programme entrant
- CO = College Accelerator Programme entrant
- NG = Next Gen Accelerator Program entrant
- w/o = Walkover
- r = Retired
- d = Defaulted

=== Finals ===
Semifinals
Q	(Spain) Àlex Martínez	7	7
(Spain) Daniel Rincón	5	5
Q	(United States) Dali Blanch	3	6	6^{2}
Alt	(Italy) Raúl Brancaccio	6	0	7^{7}

Final
Q	(Spain) Àlex Martínez	1	4
Alt	(Italy) Raúl Brancaccio	6	6

=== Top half ===
First round
1	(France) V Royer	6	7
(Lithuania) E Butvilas	3	5
Q	(Spain) Àlex Martínez	7^{7}	6
(Portugal) T Pereira	6^{3}	3
(Spain) N Sánchez Izquierdo	1	3
(Spain) P Martín Tiffon	6	6
(Slovakia) N Gombos	6	2	1
8	I Gakhov	3	6	6
4	(Czech Republic) Z Kolář	7	6^{5}	1
Q	(Spain) Sergio Callejón Hernando	5	7^{7}	6
(Italy) Fabrizio Andaloro	6	4	4
Q	(Czech Republic) A Paulson	3	6	6
(Spain) M Damas	3	6	6
(Jordan) A Shelbayh	6	3	1
(Spain) D Rincón	7^{7}	6
6	(Portugal) F Ferreira Silva	6^{2}	1

Second round
1	(France) V Royer	7^{9}	4	3
Q	(Spain) À Martínez	6^{7}	6	6
(Spain) P Martín Tiffon	6	7
8	I Gakhov	1	5
Q	(Spain) S Callejón Hernando	6	6
Q	(Czech Republic) A Paulson	2	1
(Spain) M Damas	2	6	2
(Spain) D Rincón	6	4	6

Quarterfinals
Q	(Spain) À Martínez	7^{7}	6
(Spain) P Martín Tiffon	6^{5}	1
Q	(Spain) S Callejón Hernando	6	2	5
(Spain) D Rincón	3	6	7

Semifinals
Q	(Spain) À Martínez	7	7
(Spain) D Rincón	5	5

=== Bottom half ===
First round
7	(Spain) A Moro Cañas	6	7^{9}
(Italy) F Agamenone	3	6^{7}
Q	(United States) Dali Blanch	6	0
(France) C Hemery	0	0^{r}
Q	Y Demin	1	6^{2}
Alt	(Czech Republic) J Forejtek	6	7^{7}
WC	(Italy) Felipe Virgili	2	1
3	(Spain) R Carballés Baena	6	6
5	(Germany) J Engel	7	1	6
Q	(Spain) I Montes de la Torre	5	6	3
(Austria) S Kopp	7	4	2
WC	(Spain) A Sánchez Quílez	5	6	6
(France) M Martineau	2
WC	(Spain) P Vives Marcos	4^{r}
Alt	(Italy) R Brancaccio	6	1
2	(Austria) S Ofner	3	0^{r}

Second round
7	(Spain) A Moro Cañas	6^{2}	2
Q	(United States) Dal Blanch	7^{7}	6
Alt	(Czech Republic) J Forejtek	2	6	6
3	(Spain) R Carballés Baena	6	1	3
5	(Germany) J Engel	0	5
WC	(Spain) A Sánchez Quílez	6	7
(France) M Martineau	0	7	1
Alt	(Italy) R Brancaccio	6	5	6

Quarterfinals
Q	(United States) Dal Blanch	6	6
Alt	(Czech Republic) J Forejtek	2	3
WC	(Spain) A Sánchez Quílez	6	1	3
Alt	(Italy) R Brancaccio	1	6	6

Semifinals
Q	(United States) Dal Blanch	3	6	6^{2}
Alt	(Italy) R Brancaccio	6	0	7^{7}
