= 2024 Aspria Tennis Cup – Doubles =

Doubles
- 2024 Aspria Tennis Cup

Final
- Champions: (Germany) Andre Begemann (France) Jonathan Eysseric
- Runners-up: (Czech Republic) Petr Nouza (Czech Republic) Patrik Rikl
- Score: 2–6, 6–4, [10–6]

Events
Singles	Doubles
← 2023 ·	Aspria Tennis Cup	· 2025 →

Jonathan Eysseric and Denys Molchanov were the defending champions but chose to defend their title with different partners. Eysseric partnered Andre Begemann and successfully defended his title after defeating Petr Nouza and Patrik Rikl in the final. Molchanov partnered Théo Arribagé but lost in the semifinals to Nouza and Rikl.

Begemann and Eysseric won the title after defeating Nouza and Rikl 2–6, 6–4, [10–6] in the final.

== Seeds ==
1. (France) Théo Arribagé / (Ukraine) Denys Molchanov (semifinals)
2. (Bolivia) Boris Arias / (Bolivia) Federico Zeballos (first round)
3. (Germany) Andre Begemann / (France) Jonathan Eysseric (champions)
4. (Australia) Matthew Romios / (United States) Reese Stalder (first round)

== Draw ==
=== Key ===
- Q = Qualifier
- WC = Wild card
- LL = Lucky loser
- Alt = Alternate
- SE = Special exempt
- PR = Protected ranking
- ITF = ITF entry
- JE = Junior exempt
- w/o = Walkover
- r = Retired
- d = Defaulted
- SR = Special ranking

=== Draw ===
First round
1	(France) T Arribagé (Ukraine) D Molchanov	7^{7}	6
(United States) G Goldhoff (Romania) A Jecan	6^{3}	4
(Japan) T Matsui (Japan) K Uesugi	w/o
(Peru) G Bueno (Argentina) FA Gómez
4	(Australia) MC Romios (United States) R Stalder	3	7	[14]
(Czech Republic) P Nouza (Czech Republic) P Rikl	6	5	[16]
(Australia) T Fancutt (New Zealand) R Statham	6	5	[10]
WC	(Italy) G Ricca (Italy) Alexander Weis	4	7	[6]
(Brazil) O Luz (Brazil) M Zormann	6	6
(Greece) M Kalovelonis (Canada) K Stevenson	3	2
(India) RC Bollipalli (India) N Kaliyanda Poonacha	2	6	[6]
3	(Germany) A Begemann (France) J Eysseric	6	4	[10]
(United Kingdom) S Duncan (United States) H Reese	2	6^{3}
(Serbia) I Sabanov (Serbia) M Sabanov	6	7^{7}
WC	(Italy) F Cinà (Italy) F Gaio	4	6	[10]
2	(Bolivia) B Arias (Bolivia) F Zeballos	6	3	[8]

Quarterfinals
1	(France) T Arribagé (Ukraine) D Molchanov	6	6
(Japan) T Matsui (Japan) K Uesugi	2	3
(Czech Republic) P Nouza (Czech Republic) P Rikl	7^{7}	7^{7}
(Australia) T Fancutt (New Zealand) R Statham	6^{1}	6^{4}
(Brazil) O Luz (Brazil) M Zormann	6^{5}	3
3	(Germany) A Begemann (France) J Eysseric	7^{7}	6
(Serbia) I Sabanov (Serbia) M Sabanov	6^{4}	6	[10]
WC	(Italy) F Cinà (Italy) F Gaio	7^{7}	3	[6]

Semifinals
1	(France) T Arribagé (Ukraine) D Molchanov	5	6^{6}
(Czech Republic) P Nouza (Czech Republic) P Rikl	7	7^{8}
3	(Germany) A Begemann (France) J Eysseric	7	6
(Serbia) I Sabanov (Serbia) M Sabanov	5	4

Final
(Czech Republic) P Nouza (Czech Republic) P Rikl	6	4	[6]
3	(Germany) A Begemann (France) J Eysseric	2	6	[10]
