= 2026 Open Menorca – Doubles =

Doubles
- 2026 Open Menorca

Final
- Champions: (Thailand) Pruchya Isaro (India) Niki Kaliyanda Poonacha
- Runners-up: (India) Siddhant Banthia (Bulgaria) Alexander Donski
- Score: 6–3, 7–6^{(7–3)}

Events
Singles	Doubles
- Open Menorca

Benjamin Hassan and Sebastian Ofner were the defending champions but chose not to defend their title.

Pruchya Isaro and Niki Kaliyanda Poonacha won the title after defeating Siddhant Banthia and Alexander Donski 6–3, 7–6^{(7–3)} in the final.

== Seeds ==
1. (Poland) Szymon Kielan / (India) Vijay SP Natarajan (first round)
2. (India) Siddhant Banthia / (Bulgaria) Alexander Donski (final)
3. (United States) George Goldhoff / (France) Grégoire Jacq (first round)
4. (Czech Republic) Andrew Paulson / (Czech Republic) Michael Vrbenský (quarterfinals)

== Draw ==
Key

- Q = Qualifier
- WC = Wild card
- LL = Lucky loser
- Alt = Alternate
- ITF = ITF entry
- PR = Protected ranking
- SR = Special ranking
- SE = Special exempt
- JE = Junior exempt
- JR = Junior Accelerator Programme entrant
- CO = College Accelerator Programme entrant
- NG = Next Gen Accelerator Program entrant
- w/o = Walkover
- r = Retired
- d = Defaulted

First round
1	(Poland) S Kielan (India) VSP Natarajan	2	4
(Thailand) P Isaro (India) N Kaliyanda Poonacha	6	6
(Spain) M Damas (Spain) A Moro Cañas	7^{7}	7^{7}
(Italy) F Agamenone (Spain) N Sánchez Izquierdo	6^{4}	6^{4}
4	(Czech Republic) A Paulson (Czech Republic) M Vrbenský	7^{8}	6
I Liutarevich (Spain) B Pujol Navarro	6^{6}	0
(Ukraine) D Molchanov (Japan) S Watanabe	6	6
WC	(Italy) Alessandro Coccioli (Italy) Felipe Virgili	3	2
(Czech Republic) Z Kolář (Spain) S Martos Gornés	3	6	[10]
(Finland) E Vasa (United Kingdom) M Whitehouse	6	4	[2]
(Lithuania) E Butvilas (Portugal) T Pereira	7	6
3	(United States) G Goldhoff (France) G Jacq	5	4
WC	(Spain) Izan Corretja (Spain) P Martín Tiffon	1	2
(Spain) D Vega Hernández (Spain) B Winter López	6	6
(Peru) A Merino (Germany) C Negritu	5	6	[10]
2	(India) S Banthia (Bulgaria) A Donski	7	3	[12]

Quarterfinals
(Thailand) P Isaro (India) N Kaliyanda Poonacha	6	6
(Spain) M Damas (Spain) A Moro Cañas	3	3
4	(Czech Republic) A Paulson (Czech Republic) M Vrbenský	4	6	[3]
(Ukraine) D Molchanov (Japan) S Watanabe	6	4	[10]
(Czech Republic) Z Kolář (Spain) S Martos Gornés	6^{0}	6^{4}
(Lithuania) E Butvilas (Portugal) T Pereira	7^{7}	7^{7}
(Spain) D Vega Hernández (Spain) B Winter López	2	6	[7]
2	(India) S Banthia (Bulgaria) A Donski	6	4	[10]

Semifinals
(Thailand) P Isaro (India) N Kaliyanda Poonacha	6	6
(Ukraine) D Molchanov (Japan) S Watanabe	3	1
(Lithuania) E Butvilas (Portugal) T Pereira	4	1
2	(India) S Banthia (Bulgaria) A Donski	6	6

Final
(Thailand) P Isaro (India) N Kaliyanda Poonacha	6	7^{7}
2	(India) S Banthia (Bulgaria) A Donski	3	6^{3}
