= 2024 Aspria Tennis Cup – Singles =

Singles
- 2024 Aspria Tennis Cup

Final
- Champion: (Argentina) Federico Agustín Gómez
- Runner-up: (Romania) Filip Cristian Jianu
- Score: 6–3, 6–4

Events
Singles	Doubles
← 2023 ·	Aspria Tennis Cup	· 2025 →

Federico Agustín Gómez defeated Filip Cristian Jianu in the final, 6–3, 6–4, to win the men's singles title at the 2024 Aspria Tennis Cup.

Facundo Díaz Acosta was the defending champion but chose not to defend his title.

== Seeds ==
1. (Spain) Albert Ramos Viñolas (second round)
2. (Peru) Juan Pablo Varillas (second round)
3. (Chinese Taipei) Tseng Chun-hsin (quarterfinals)
4. (Poland) Maks Kaśnikowski (first round)
5. (Italy) Enrico Dalla Valle (semifinals)
6. (Spain) Javier Barranco Cosano (first round)
7. (Belgium) Gauthier Onclin (first round)
8. (Spain) Nikolás Sánchez Izquierdo (second round)

== Draw ==
=== Key ===
- Q = Qualifier
- WC = Wild card
- LL = Lucky loser
- Alt = Alternate
- SE = Special exempt
- PR = Protected ranking
- ITF = ITF entry
- JE = Junior exempt
- w/o = Walkover
- r = Retired
- d = Defaulted
- SR = Special ranking

=== Finals ===
Semifinals
(Italy) Samuel Vincent Ruggeri	6	3	3
Q	(Argentina) Federico Agustín Gómez	3	6	6
5	(Italy) Enrico Dalla Valle	3	6	5
(Romania) Filip Cristian Jianu	6	0	7

Final
Q	(Argentina) Federico Agustín Gómez	6	6
(Romania) Filip Cristian Jianu	3	4

=== Top half ===
First round
1	(Spain) A Ramos Viñolas	4	6	7^{7}
(Peru) G Bueno	6	0	6^{3}
(Italy) Samuel Vincent Ruggeri	6^{3}	6	6
Alt	(Czech Republic) M Vrbenský	7^{7}	4	1
Q	(Italy) F Gaio	6	1	6
E Gerasimov	3	6	3
I Gakhov	6	6
7	(Belgium) G Onclin	2	2
4	(Poland) M Kaśnikowski	4	6^{5}
PR	(Spain) N Álvarez Varona	6	7^{7}
Y Demin	1	0
(Lithuania) V Gaubas	6	6
Q	(Argentina) FA Gómez	6	6
Q	(Italy) F Arnaboldi	2	4
WC	(Italy) Andrea Picchione	3	6	1
8	(Spain) N Sánchez Izquierdo	6	1	6

Second round
1	(Spain) A Ramos Viñolas	2	4
(Italy) S Vincent Ruggeri	6	6
Q	(Italy) F Gaio	6^{5}	3
I Gakhov	7^{7}	6
PR	(Spain) N Álvarez Varona	6	3	4
(Lithuania) V Gaubas	4	6	6
Q	(Argentina) FA Gómez	4	6	6
8	(Spain) N Sánchez Izquierdo	6	4	1

Quarterfinals
(Italy) S Vincent Ruggeri	7^{7}	6
I Gakhov	6^{5}	4
(Lithuania) V Gaubas	1	4
Q	(Argentina) FA Gómez	6	6

Semifinals
(Italy) S Vincent Ruggeri	6	3	3
Q	(Argentina) FA Gómez	3	6	6

=== Bottom half ===
First round
5	(Italy) E Dalla Valle	6	1	6
Q	(Peru) I Buse	4	6	2
(France) M Bourgue	2	6	6^{8}
Alt	(Italy) G Fonio	6	3	7^{10}
(Mexico) R Pacheco Méndez	1	6	3
(Italy) G Mager	6	3	6
Q	(Spain) C Taberner	5	6	4
3	(Chinese Taipei) C-h Tseng	7	3	6
6	(Spain) J Barranco Cosano	3	6^{7}
(Romania) FC Jianu	6	7^{9}
WC	(Italy) F Cinà	2	6^{4}
WC	(Italy) M Cecchinato	6	7^{7}
(France) T Lamasine	6^{4}	6^{3}
(Denmark) E Møller	7^{7}	7^{7}
Q	(France) G Debru	4	6	3
2	(Peru) JP Varillas	6	4	6

Second round
5	(Italy) E Dalla Valle	7^{7}	6
Alt	(Italy) G Fonio	6^{5}	5^{r}
(Italy) G Mager	5	5
3	(Chinese Taipei) C-h Tseng	7	7
(Romania) FC Jianu	6	7
WC	(Italy) M Cecchinato	1	5
(Denmark) E Møller	6	6
2	(Peru) JP Varillas	3	1

Quarterfinals
5	(Italy) E Dalla Valle	6	6
3	(Chinese Taipei) C-h Tseng	0	4
(Romania) FC Jianu	2	6	0
(Denmark) E Møller	6	2	0^{r}

Semifinals
5	(Italy) E Dalla Valle	3	6	5
(Romania) FC Jianu	6	0	7
