= 2025 Open Menorca – Doubles =

Doubles
- 2025 Open Menorca

Final
- Champions: (Lebanon) Benjamin Hassan (Austria) Sebastian Ofner
- Runners-up: (Italy) Andrea Vavassori (Italy) Matteo Vavassori
- Score: 7–5, 6–3

Events
Singles	Doubles
- Open Menorca

This was the first edition of the tournament.

Benjamin Hassan and Sebastian Ofner won the title after defeating Andrea and Matteo Vavassori 7–5, 6–3 in the final.

== Seeds ==
1. (India) Jeevan Nedunchezhiyan / (India) Vijay Sundar Prashanth (first round)
2. (Denmark) Johannes Ingildsen / (United Kingdom) David Stevenson (quarterfinals)
3. (Israel) Daniel Cukierman / (United Kingdom) Joshua Paris (semifinals)
4. (India) Niki Kaliyanda Poonacha / (Spain) Sergio Martos Gornés (quarterfinals)

== Draw ==
Key

- Q = Qualifier
- WC = Wild card
- LL = Lucky loser
- Alt = Alternate
- ITF = ITF entry
- PR = Protected ranking
- SR = Special ranking
- SE = Special exempt
- JE = Junior exempt
- JR = Junior Accelerator Programme entrant
- CO = College Accelerator Programme entrant
- NG = Next Gen Accelerator Program entrant
- w/o = Walkover
- r = Retired
- d = Defaulted

=== Draw ===
First round
1	(India) J Nedunchezhiyan (India) VS Prashanth	2	0
WC	(Italy) A Vavassori (Italy) Matteo Vavassori	6	6
(Czech Republic) Jiří Barnat (Czech Republic) F Duda	6	6
(Czech Republic) M Vocel (Poland) S Walków	1	4
3	(Israel) D Cukierman (United Kingdom) J Paris	7^{7}	5	[10]
(India) A Chandrasekar (Spain) D Vega Hernández	6^{4}	7	[5]
(India) S Myneni (India) R Ramanathan	6	6
WC	(Argentina) P Cachin (Spain) Izan Corretja	1	2
(Italy) M Bortolotti (Italy) G Ricca	6	4	[8]
(Lebanon) B Hassan (Austria) S Ofner	3	6	[10]
(Spain) N Álvarez Varona (Spain) C Taberner	3	3
4	(India) N Kaliyanda Poonacha (Spain) S Martos Gornés	6	6
(Spain) D Rincón (Spain) O Roca Batalla	6	6
(Germany) D Masur (France) L Sanchez	1	4
PR	(Belgium) K Coppejans (Hungary) Z Piros	2	2
2	(Denmark) J Ingildsen (United Kingdom) D Stevenson	6	6

Quarterfinals
WC	(Italy) A Vavassori (Italy) M Vavassori	6	6
(Czech Republic) J Barnat (Czech Republic) F Duda	4	1
3	(Israel) D Cukierman (United Kingdom) J Paris	7	6^{2}	[10]
(India) S Myneni (India) R Ramanathan	5	7^{7}	[4]
(Lebanon) B Hassan (Austria) S Ofner	6	5	[10]
4	(India) N Kaliyanda Poonacha (Spain) S Martos Gornés	4	7	[5]
(Spain) D Rincón (Spain) O Roca Batalla	6	7^{7}
2	(Denmark) J Ingildsen (United Kingdom) D Stevenson	3	6^{5}

Semifinals
WC	(Italy) A Vavassori (Italy) M Vavassori	6	6
3	(Israel) D Cukierman (United Kingdom) J Paris	3	3
(Lebanon) B Hassan (Austria) S Ofner	6	6
(Spain) D Rincón (Spain) O Roca Batalla	1	4

Final
WC	(Italy) A Vavassori (Italy) M Vavassori	5	3
(Lebanon) B Hassan (Austria) S Ofner	7	6
