= 2024 Garden Open – Doubles =

Doubles
- 2024 Garden Open

Final
- Champions: (United Kingdom) Luke Johnson (Tunisia) Skander Mansouri
- Runners-up: (Italy) Lorenzo Rottoli (Italy) Samuel Vincent Ruggeri
- Score: 6–2, 6–4

Events
Singles	Doubles
← 2023 ·	Garden Open	· 2025 →

Nicolás Barrientos and Francisco Cabral were the defending champions but chose not to defend their title.

Luke Johnson and Skander Mansouri won the title after defeating Lorenzo Rottoli and Samuel Vincent Ruggeri 6–2, 6–4 in the final.

== Seeds ==
1. (United Kingdom) Julian Cash / (United States) Robert Galloway (quarterfinals)
2. (Germany) Constantin Frantzen / (Germany) Hendrik Jebens (first round)
3. (Bolivia) Boris Arias / (Bolivia) Federico Zeballos (first round)
4. (Ecuador) Diego Hidalgo / (Colombia) Cristian Rodríguez (quarterfinals)

== Draw ==
=== Key ===
- Q = Qualifier
- WC = Wild card
- LL = Lucky loser
- Alt = Alternate
- ITF = ITF entry
- PR = Protected ranking
- SR = Special ranking
- SE = Special exempt
- JE = Junior exempt
- JR = Junior Accelerator Programme entrant
- CO = College Accelerator Programme entrant
- NG = Next Gen Accelerator Program entrant
- w/o = Walkover
- r = Retired
- d = Defaulted

=== Draw ===
First round
1	(United Kingdom) J Cash (United States) R Galloway	6	6
(Brazil) F Romboli (Brazil) M Zormann	4	4
I Liutarevich (Ukraine) V Manafov	4	6	[4]
WC	(Italy) L Rottoli (Italy) Samuel Vincent Ruggeri	6	2	[10]
4	(Ecuador) D Hidalgo (Colombia) C Rodríguez	5	7	[10]
(Italy) M Bortolotti (Spain) O Roca Batalla	7	5	[6]
(Switzerland) L Margaroli (Spain) D Vega Hernández	6	6
WC	(Italy) Alessio Balestrieri (Italy) R Brancaccio	3	3
(India) S Balaji (Germany) A Begemann	6	6
(Serbia) N Ćaćić (Netherlands) B Stevens	3	4
(United Kingdom) L Johnson (Tunisia) S Mansouri	4	6	[10]
3	(Bolivia) B Arias (Bolivia) F Zeballos	6	3	[5]
(Spain) S Martos Gornés (Greece) Pe Tsitsipas	3	3
(Brazil) M Demoliner (Sweden) A Göransson	6	6
(France) J Eysseric (Italy) A Pellegrino	7^{11}	6
2	(Germany) C Frantzen (Germany) H Jebens	6^{9}	4

Quarterfinals
1	(United Kingdom) J Cash (United States) R Galloway	4	4
WC	(Italy) L Rottoli (Italy) S Vincent Ruggeri	6	6
4	(Ecuador) D Hidalgo (Colombia) C Rodríguez	6	6^{2}	[7]
(Switzerland) L Margaroli (Spain) D Vega Hernández	3	7^{7}	[10]
(India) S Balaji (Germany) A Begemann	6^{6}	7^{8}	[3]
(United Kingdom) L Johnson (Tunisia) S Mansouri	7^{8}	6^{6}	[10]
(Brazil) M Demoliner (Sweden) A Göransson	1	0
(France) J Eysseric (Italy) A Pellegrino	6	6

Semifinals
WC	(Italy) L Rottoli (Italy) S Vincent Ruggeri	2	6	[11]
(Switzerland) L Margaroli (Spain) D Vega Hernández	6	3	[9]
(United Kingdom) L Johnson (Tunisia) S Mansouri	6	6
(France) J Eysseric (Italy) A Pellegrino	3	3

Final
WC	(Italy) L Rottoli (Italy) S Vincent Ruggeri	2	4
(United Kingdom) L Johnson (Tunisia) S Mansouri	6	6
