= 2024 Garden Open =

- Date: 22 – 28 April
- Edition: 16th
- Surface: Clay
- Location: Rome, Italy

Champions

Singles
- (Spain) Alejandro Moro Cañas

Doubles
- (United Kingdom) Luke Johnson / (Tunisia) Skander Mansouri
← 2023 ·	Garden Open	· 2025 →

The 2024 Garden Open was a professional tennis tournament played on clay courts. It was the 16th edition of the tournament which was part of the 2024 ATP Challenger Tour. It took place in Rome, Italy between 22 and 28 April 2024.

== Singles main-draw entrants ==
=== Seeds ===
Country	Player	Rank^{1}	Seed
HUN	Zsombor Piros	122	1
USA	Nicolas Moreno de Alboran	140	2
ARG	Juan Manuel Cerúndolo	153	3
SVK	Jozef Kovalík	155	4
NED	Jesper de Jong	158	5
FRA	Hugo Grenier	159	6
ITA	Andrea Pellegrino	165	7
BOL	Hugo Dellien	178	8

- ^{1} Rankings as of 15 April 2024.

=== Other entrants ===
The following players received wildcards into the singles main draw:

- (Italy) Raúl Brancaccio
- (Italy) Gabriele Pennaforti
- (Italy) Samuel Vincent Ruggeri

The following players received entry into the singles main draw as alternates:

- (Bulgaria) Adrian Andreev
- (Italy) Edoardo Lavagno
- (Spain) Alejandro Moro Cañas
- (Spain) Nikolás Sánchez Izquierdo

The following players received entry from the qualifying draw:

- (Peru) Ignacio Buse
- (Lithuania) Vilius Gaubas
- (Netherlands) Ryan Nijboer
- (Italy) Giovanni Oradini
- (Italy) Marcello Serafini
- (Spain) Carlos Taberner

== Champions ==
=== Singles ===
- (Spain) Alejandro Moro Cañas def. (Lithuania) Vilius Gaubas 7–5, 6–3.

=== Doubles ===
- (United Kingdom) Luke Johnson / (Tunisia) Skander Mansouri def. (Italy) Lorenzo Rottoli / (Italy) Samuel Vincent Ruggeri 6–2, 6–4.
