= 2025 Lisboa Belém Open – Men's doubles =

Men's doubles
- 2025 Lisboa Belém Open

Final
- Champions: (Spain) Pablo Llamas Ruiz (Spain) Sergio Martos Gornés
- Runners-up: (Romania) Alexandru Jecan (Romania) Bogdan Pavel
- Score: 7–6^{(7–5)}, 6–4

Events
Singles	men	women
Doubles	men	women
← 2024 ·	Lisboa Belém Open	· 2026 →

Romain Arneodo and Théo Arribagé were the defending champions but chose not to defend their title.

Pablo Llamas Ruiz and Sergio Martos Gornés won the title after defeating Alexandru Jecan and Bogdan Pavel 7–6^{(7–5)}, 6–4 in the final.

== Seeds ==
1. (Brazil) Marcelo Demoliner / (Brazil) Orlando Luz (semifinals)
2. (Poland) Karol Drzewiecki / (Poland) Piotr Matuszewski (first round, retired)
3. (Peru) Alexander Merino / (Germany) Christoph Negritu (first round)
4. (Spain) Íñigo Cervantes / (Israel) Daniel Cukierman (quarterfinals)

== Draw ==
Key

- Q = Qualifier
- WC = Wild card
- LL = Lucky loser
- Alt = Alternate
- ITF = ITF entry
- PR = Protected ranking
- SR = Special ranking
- SE = Special exempt
- JE = Junior exempt
- JR = Junior Accelerator Programme entrant
- CO = College Accelerator Programme entrant
- NG = Next Gen Accelerator Program entrant
- w/o = Walkover
- r = Retired
- d = Defaulted

=== Draw ===
First round
1	(Brazil) M Demoliner (Brazil) O Luz	6	7^{8}
(Austria) D Pichler (Croatia) N Serdarušić	3	6^{6}
(Bulgaria) A Donski (Serbia) S Latinović	7^{7}	5	[9]
WC	(Portugal) Francisco Rocha (Portugal) H Rocha	6^{3}	7	[11]
4	(Spain) Í Cervantes (Israel) D Cukierman	6	6
WC	(Portugal) Pedro Araújo (Portugal) Diogo Marques	4	2
PR	(Spain) P Llamas Ruiz (Spain) S Martos Gornés	6	6
(Denmark) J Ingildsen (Portugal) T Pereira	4	2
(Italy) G Ricca (Spain) D Vega Hernández	2	4
(Spain) M Mansilla Díez (Spain) B Pujol Navarro	6	6
(Romania) V Cornea (Italy) A Pellegrino	6	6^{5}	[11]
3	(Peru) A Merino (Germany) C Negritu	4	7^{7}	[9]
Alt	(Italy) M Cecchinato (Italy) S Travaglia	3	2
(Romania) A Jecan (Romania) B Pavel	6	6
(Ukraine) D Molchanov (Czech Republic) M Vrbenský	6	1
2	(Poland) K Drzewiecki (Poland) P Matuszewski	2	0^{r}

Quarterfinals
1	(Brazil) M Demoliner (Brazil) O Luz	7^{7}	6
WC	(Portugal) F Rocha (Portugal) H Rocha	6^{2}	4
4	(Spain) Í Cervantes (Israel) D Cukierman	2	4
PR	(Spain) P Llamas Ruiz (Spain) S Martos Gornés	6	6
(Spain) M Mansilla Díez (Spain) B Pujol Navarro	3	2
(Romania) V Cornea (Italy) A Pellegrino	6	6
(Romania) A Jecan (Romania) B Pavel	7^{7}	7^{11}
(Ukraine) D Molchanov (Czech Republic) M Vrbenský	6^{1}	6^{9}

Semifinals
1	(Brazil) M Demoliner (Brazil) O Luz	6	6^{4}	[10]
PR	(Spain) P Llamas Ruiz (Spain) S Martos Gornés	1	7^{7}	[12]
(Romania) V Cornea (Italy) A Pellegrino	2	6	[8]
(Romania) A Jecan (Romania) B Pavel	6	4	[10]

Final
PR	(Spain) P Llamas Ruiz (Spain) S Martos Gornés	7^{7}	6
(Romania) A Jecan (Romania) B Pavel	6^{5}	4
