= 2024 Garden Open – Singles =

Singles
- 2024 Garden Open

Final
- Champion: (Spain) Alejandro Moro Cañas
- Runner-up: (Lithuania) Vilius Gaubas
- Score: 7–5, 6–3

Events
Singles	Doubles
← 2023 ·	Garden Open	· 2025 →

Sumit Nagal was the defending champion but chose not to defend his title.

Alejandro Moro Cañas won the title after defeating Vilius Gaubas 7–5, 6–3 in the final.

== Seeds ==
1. (Hungary) Zsombor Piros (first round)
2. (United States) Nicolas Moreno de Alboran (quarterfinals)
3. (Argentina) Juan Manuel Cerúndolo (second round)
4. (Slovakia) Jozef Kovalík (second round)
5. (Netherlands) Jesper de Jong (quarterfinals)
6. (France) Hugo Grenier (first round)
7. (Italy) Andrea Pellegrino (first round)
8. (Bolivia) Hugo Dellien (semifinals)

== Draw ==
=== Key ===
- Q = Qualifier
- WC = Wild card
- LL = Lucky loser
- Alt = Alternate
- SE = Special exempt
- PR = Protected ranking
- ITF = ITF entry
- JE = Junior exempt
- w/o = Walkover
- r = Retired
- d = Defaulted
- SR = Special ranking

=== Finals ===
Semifinals
Alt	(Spain) Alejandro Moro Cañas	6	6^{4}	6
(Italy) Stefano Travaglia	3	7^{7}	2
8	(Bolivia) Hugo Dellien	4	5
Q	(Lithuania) Vilius Gaubas	6	7

Final
Alt	(Spain) Alejandro Moro Cañas	7	6
Q	(Lithuania) Vilius Gaubas	5	3

=== Top half ===
First round
1	(Hungary) Z Piros	4	3
Alt	(Spain) A Moro Cañas	6	6
Q	(Netherlands) Ryan Nijboer	6	3	6
(Italy) F Passaro	2	6	2
Q	(Italy) Marcello Serafini	3	7^{7}	6
WC	(Italy) R Brancaccio	6	6^{2}	4
(Bosnia and Herzegovina) N Fatić	6	6^{6}	1^{r}
5	(Netherlands) J de Jong	3	7^{8}	4
3	(Argentina) JM Cerúndolo	6	6
(Spain) O Roca Batalla	3	2
(Italy) S Travaglia	6	6
Q	(Italy) G Oradini	2	4
Q	(Spain) C Taberner	6	7^{8}
Q	(Peru) I Buse	1	6^{6}
(Italy) F Maestrelli	6	6
6	(France) H Grenier	0	4

Second round
Alt	(Spain) A Moro Cañas	6^{1}	6	6
Q	(Netherlands) R Nijboer	7^{7}	4	3
Q	(Italy) M Serafini	3	3
5	(Netherlands) J de Jong	6	6
3	(Argentina) JM Cerúndolo	6	5	2
(Italy) S Travaglia	4	7	6
Q	(Spain) C Taberner	4	5
(Italy) F Maestrelli	6	7

Quarterfinals
Alt	(Spain) A Moro Cañas	7^{7}	6
5	(Netherlands) J de Jong	6^{1}	4
(Italy) S Travaglia	7^{11}	7
(Italy) F Maestrelli	6^{9}	5

Semifinals
Alt	(Spain) A Moro Cañas	6	6^{4}	6
(Italy) S Travaglia	3	7^{7}	2

=== Bottom half ===
First round
8	(Bolivia) H Dellien	4	6	6
WC	(Italy) Samuel Vincent Ruggeri	6	1	4
I Gakhov	6	4	6
(Italy) M Cecchinato	3	6	2
(United Kingdom) B Harris	3	6	6
Alt	(Bulgaria) A Andreev	6	3	4
Alt	(Spain) N Sánchez Izquierdo	6	6^{4}	2
4	(Slovakia) J Kovalík	4	7^{7}	6
7	(Italy) A Pellegrino	4	1
Q	(Lithuania) V Gaubas	6	6
(France) M Martineau	3	6	6
(France) G Blancaneaux	6	3	2
WC	(Italy) Gabriele Pennaforti	7^{7}	3	3
(Italy) F Agamenone	6^{4}	6	6
Alt	(Italy) Edoardo Lavagno	6^{1}	3
2	(United States) N Moreno de Alboran	7^{7}	6

Second round
8	(Bolivia) H Dellien	6	6
I Gakhov	3	4
(United Kingdom) B Harris	6	6
4	(Slovakia) J Kovalík	3	4
Q	(Lithuania) V Gaubas	7	4	6
(France) M Martineau	5	6	4
(Italy) F Agamenone	6	3	1
2	(United States) N Moreno de Alboran	4	6	6

Quarterfinals
8	(Bolivia) H Dellien	2	6	6
(United Kingdom) B Harris	6	3	4
Q	(Lithuania) V Gaubas	6	6
2	(United States) N Moreno de Alboran	3	4

Semifinals
8	(Bolivia) H Dellien	4	5
Q	(Lithuania) V Gaubas	6	7
