= 2025 Open Menorca – Singles =

Singles
- 2025 Open Menorca

Final
- Champion: (Lithuania) Vilius Gaubas
- Runner-up: (Spain) Pol Martín Tiffon
- Score: 6–0, 6–4

Events
Singles	Doubles
- Open Menorca

This was the first edition of the tournament.

Vilius Gaubas won the title after defeating Pol Martín Tiffon 6–0, 6–4 in the final.

== Seeds ==
1. (United Kingdom) Billy Harris (first round)
2. (Austria) Sebastian Ofner (quarterfinals)
3. (Croatia) Marin Čilić (first round)
4. (Denmark) Elmer Møller (quarterfinals)
5. (Spain) Carlos Taberner (quarterfinals)
6. (United Kingdom) Jan Choinski (second round)
7. (Lithuania) Vilius Gaubas (champion)
8. (Lithuania) Edas Butvilas (first round)

== Draw ==
Key

- Q = Qualifier
- WC = Wild card
- LL = Lucky loser
- Alt = Alternate
- ITF = ITF entry
- PR = Protected ranking
- SR = Special ranking
- SE = Special exempt
- JE = Junior exempt
- JR = Junior Accelerator Programme entrant
- CO = College Accelerator Programme entrant
- NG = Next Gen Accelerator Program entrant
- w/o = Walkover
- r = Retired
- d = Defaulted

=== Finals ===
Semifinals
(Spain) Pol Martín Tiffon	6	4	6
(Austria) Lukas Neumayer	3	6	3
(Peru) Ignacio Buse	4	6	4
7	(Lithuania) Vilius Gaubas	6	4	6

Final
(Spain) Pol Martín Tiffon	0	4
7	(Lithuania) Vilius Gaubas	6	6

=== Top half ===
First round
1	(United Kingdom) B Harris	2	6	4
(Spain) A Ramos Viñolas	6	4	6
(Germany) J Engel	4	6	3
(Spain) P Martín Tiffon	6	3	6
Q	(Spain) D Mérida	6^{3}	6	6
(Dominican Republic) N Hardt	7^{7}	4	2
Alt	(Kazakhstan) D Yevseyev	2	6	1
5	(Spain) C Taberner	6	4	6
4/SE	(Denmark) E Møller	6	6
Q	(Spain) M Alcalá Gurri	3	3
WC	(Spain) N Álvarez Varona	6^{1}	3
(Lebanon) B Hassan	7^{7}	6
WC	(Italy) Felipe Virgili	3	4
(Austria) L Neumayer	6	6
WC	(Argentina) P Cachin	6	6
8	(Lithuania) E Butvilas	2	3

Second round
(Spain) A Ramos Viñolas	1	4
(Spain) P Martín Tiffon	6	6
Q	(Spain) D Mérida	6	5	0
5	(Spain) C Taberner	3	7	6
4/SE	(Denmark) E Møller	7^{9}	6
(Lebanon) B Hassan	6^{7}	0
(Austria) L Neumayer	7^{7}	6
WC	(Argentina) P Cachin	6^{2}	0

Quarterfinals
(Spain) P Martín Tiffon	4	6	6
5	(Spain) C Taberner	6	4	3
4/SE	(Denmark) E Møller	3	4
(Austria) L Neumayer	6	6

Semifinals
(Spain) P Martín Tiffon	6	4	6
(Austria) L Neumayer	3	6	3

=== Bottom half ===
First round
6	(United Kingdom) J Choinski	7^{7}	7
(Spain) O Roca Batalla	6^{4}	5
Q	(Hungary) Z Piros	5	6	6
(Italy) A Vavassori	7	3	1
(Spain) D Rincón	6^{3}	6	6
Q	(Belgium) K Coppejans	7^{7}	4	2
(Peru) I Buse	6	6
3	(Croatia) M Čilić	2	1
7	(Lithuania) V Gaubas	6	7^{7}
(Germany) H Squire	0	6^{5}
(France) A Géa	6	4	6
Q	(South Korea) G Campaña Lee	3	6	0
Q	(Switzerland) K Feldbausch	2	6	4
(Spain) J Barranco Cosano	6	3	6
(Bulgaria) A Andreev	2	0^{r}
2	(Austria) S Ofner	6	2

Second round
6	(United Kingdom) J Choinski	4	4
Q	(Hungary) Z Piros	6	6
(Spain) D Rincón	0	1
(Peru) I Buse	6	6
7	(Lithuania) V Gaubas	7	6
(France) A Géa	5	3
(Spain) J Barranco Cosano	1	6^{0}
2	(Austria) S Ofner	6	7^{7}

Quarterfinals
Q	(Hungary) Z Piros	6^{4}	3
(Peru) I Buse	7^{7}	6
7	(Lithuania) V Gaubas	7^{7}	6
2	(Austria) S Ofner	6^{2}	2

Semifinals
(Peru) I Buse	4	6	4
7	(Lithuania) V Gaubas	6	4	6
