= 2024 Aspria Tennis Cup =

- Date: 24–29 June
- Edition: 18th
- Surface: Clay
- Location: Milan, Italy

Champions

Singles
- (Argentina) Federico Agustín Gómez

Doubles
- (Germany) Andre Begemann / (France) Jonathan Eysseric
← 2023 ·	Aspria Tennis Cup	· 2025 →

The 2024 Aspria Tennis Cup was a professional tennis tournament played on clay courts. It was the 18th edition of the tournament which was part of the 2024 ATP Challenger Tour. It took place in Milan, Italy between 24 and 29 June 2024.

== Singles main-draw entrants ==
=== Seeds ===
Country	Player	Rank^{1}	Seed
ESP	Albert Ramos Viñolas	108	1
PER	Juan Pablo Varillas	164	2
TPE	Tseng Chun-hsin	170	3
POL	Maks Kaśnikowski	230	4
ITA	Enrico Dalla Valle	247	5
ESP	Javier Barranco Cosano	252	6
BEL	Gauthier Onclin	260	7
ESP	Nikolás Sánchez Izquierdo	263	8

- ^{1} Rankings are as of 17 June 2024.

=== Other entrants ===
The following players received wildcards into the singles main draw:

- (Italy) Marco Cecchinato
- (Italy) Federico Cinà
- (Italy) Andrea Picchione

The following player received entry into the singles main draw using a protected ranking:

- (Spain) Nicolás Álvarez Varona

The following players received entry into the singles main draw as alternates:

- (Italy) Giovanni Fonio
- (Czech Republic) Michael Vrbenský

The following players received entry from the qualifying draw:

- (Italy) Federico Arnaboldi
- (Peru) Ignacio Buse
- (France) Gabriel Debru
- (Italy) Federico Gaio
- (Argentina) Federico Agustín Gómez
- (Spain) Carlos Taberner

== Champions ==
=== Singles ===
- (Argentina) Federico Agustín Gómez def. (Romania) Filip Cristian Jianu 6–3, 6–4.

=== Doubles ===
- (Germany) Andre Begemann / (France) Jonathan Eysseric def. (Czech Republic) Petr Nouza / (Czech Republic) Patrik Rikl 2–6, 6–4, [10–6].
