= 2025 Aspria Tennis Cup – Doubles =

Doubles
- 2025 Aspria Tennis Cup

Final
- Champions: (Australia) Matthew Romios (United States) Ryan Seggerman
- Runners-up: (United States) George Goldhoff (Chinese Taipei) Ray Ho
- Score: 3–6, 7–5, [10–8]

Events
Singles	Doubles
- Aspria Tennis Cup

Andre Begemann and Jonathan Eysseric were the defending champions but chose not to defend their title.

Matthew Romios and Ryan Seggerman won the title after defeating George Goldhoff and Ray Ho 3–6, 7–5, [10–8] in the final.

== Seeds ==
1. (Australia) Matthew Romios / (United States) Ryan Seggerman (champions)
2. (Ecuador) Gonzalo Escobar / (Brazil) Marcelo Zormann (semifinals)
3. (United States) George Goldhoff / (Chinese Taipei) Ray Ho (final)
4. (Ukraine) Denys Molchanov / (Czech Republic) Matěj Vocel (first round)

== Draw ==
Key

- Q = Qualifier
- WC = Wild card
- LL = Lucky loser
- Alt = Alternate
- ITF = ITF entry
- PR = Protected ranking
- SR = Special ranking
- SE = Special exempt
- JE = Junior exempt
- JR = Junior Accelerator Programme entrant
- CO = College Accelerator Programme entrant
- NG = Next Gen Accelerator Program entrant
- w/o = Walkover
- r = Retired
- d = Defaulted

=== Draw ===
First round
1	(Australia) MC Romios (United States) R Seggerman	6	6^{5}	[10]
(United States) T Hilderbrand (United States) M Kiger	3	7^{7}	[6]
(France) L Sanchez (Japan) S Watanabe	6^{5}	6^{4}
I Liutarevich (Netherlands) M Veldheer	7^{7}	7^{7}
4	(Ukraine) D Molchanov (Czech Republic) M Vocel	4	6^{4}
(Australia) B Bayldon (Netherlands) M Hermans	6	7^{7}
WC	(Italy) F Bondioli (Italy) S Travaglia	0	1
(Peru) A Merino (Germany) C Negritu	6	6
(Italy) M Bortolotti (Italy) G Ricca	5	2
WC	(Italy) J Berrettini (Italy) G Fonio	7	6
(India) A Chandrasekar (India) R Ramanathan	6^{3}	1
3	(United States) G Goldhoff (Chinese Taipei) R Ho	7^{7}	6
(Israel) D Cukierman (Chile) M Soto	6	3	[10]
(Spain) Í Cervantes (Argentina) G Durán	3	6	[7]
(Venezuela) LD Martínez (Austria) D Pichler	1	6^{4}
2	(Ecuador) G Escobar (Brazil) M Zormann	6	7^{7}

Quarterfinals
1	(Australia) MC Romios (United States) R Seggerman	6	6^{4}	[10]
I Liutarevich (Netherlands) M Veldheer	4	7^{7}	[8]
(Australia) B Bayldon (Netherlands) M Hermans	7	6
(Peru) A Merino (Germany) C Negritu	5	4
WC	(Italy) J Berrettini (Italy) G Fonio	3	7^{7}	[8]
3	(United States) G Goldhoff (Chinese Taipei) R Ho	6	6^{4}	[10]
(Israel) D Cukierman (Chile) M Soto	6^{5}	7^{7}	[5]
2	(Ecuador) G Escobar (Brazil) M Zormann	7^{7}	6^{4}	[10]

Semifinals
1	(Australia) MC Romios (United States) R Seggerman	6	6
(Australia) B Bayldon (Netherlands) M Hermans	4	4
3	(United States) G Goldhoff (Chinese Taipei) R Ho	6	4	[10]
2	(Ecuador) G Escobar (Brazil) M Zormann	4	6	[5]

Final
1	(Australia) MC Romios (United States) R Seggerman	3	7	[10]
3	(United States) G Goldhoff (Chinese Taipei) R Ho	6	5	[8]
