= 2023 Aspria Tennis Cup – Doubles =

Doubles
- 2023 Aspria Tennis Cup

Final
- Champions: (France) Jonathan Eysseric (Ukraine) Denys Molchanov
- Runners-up: (France) Théo Arribagé (France) Luca Sanchez
- Score: 6–2, 6–4

Events
Singles	Doubles
- Aspria Tennis Cup

Luciano Darderi and Fernando Romboli were the defending champions but only Darderi chose to defend his title, partnering Thiago Agustín Tirante. Darderi lost in the first round to Rémy Bertola and Gianmarco Ferrari.

Jonathan Eysseric and Denys Molchanov won the title after defeating Théo Arribagé and Luca Sanchez 6–2, 6–4 in the final.

== Seeds ==
1. (France) Jonathan Eysseric / (Ukraine) Denys Molchanov (champions)
2. (Ecuador) Diego Hidalgo / (Spain) Sergio Martos Gornés (semifinals)
3. (France) Théo Arribagé / (France) Luca Sanchez (final)
4. (Philippines) Ruben Gonzales / (Australia) Jason Taylor (first round)

== Draw ==
Key

- Q = Qualifier
- WC = Wild card
- LL = Lucky loser
- Alt = Alternate
- ITF = ITF entry
- PR = Protected ranking
- SR = Special ranking
- SE = Special exempt
- JE = Junior exempt
- JR = Junior Accelerator Programme entrant
- CO = College Accelerator Programme entrant
- NG = Next Gen Accelerator Program entrant
- w/o = Walkover
- r = Retired
- d = Defaulted

First round
1	(France) J Eysseric (Ukraine) D Molchanov	2	7^{7}	[10]
Alt	(Italy) G Oradini (Italy) Alexander Weis	6	6^{3}	[5]
(Italy) M Gigante (Italy) F Maestrelli	7^{7}	6
WC	(Italy) Marco Berti (Italy) Matteo Volante	6^{4}	3
4	(Philippines) R Gonzales (Australia) J Taylor	6^{5}	2
PR	(Romania) A Jecan (Greece) M Kalovelonis	7^{7}	6
(Kazakhstan) D Popko (Spain) C Taberner	6	6
WC	(Italy) G Piraino (Italy) L Rottoli	2	3
(Croatia) Z Babić (Netherlands) M Veldheer	6	3	[11]
Alt	(Peru) G Bueno (Argentina) L Midón	1	6	[9]
PR	(Germany) A Begemann (India) R Ramanathan	4	6^{3}
3	(France) T Arribagé (France) L Sanchez	6	7^{7}
(Switzerland) R Bertola (Italy) G Ferrari	6	6
(Italy) L Darderi (Argentina) TA Tirante	4	1
(Latvia) R Strombachs (Australia) A Taylor	3	4
2	(Ecuador) D Hidalgo (Spain) S Martos Gornés	6	6

Quarterfinals
1	(France) J Eysseric (Ukraine) D Molchanov	4	6	[10]
(Italy) M Gigante (Italy) F Maestrelli	6	2	[8]
PR	(Romania) A Jecan (Greece) M Kalovelonis	6	6
(Kazakhstan) D Popko (Spain) C Taberner	2	3
(Croatia) Z Babić (Netherlands) M Veldheer	4	4
3	(France) T Arribagé (France) L Sanchez	6	6
(Switzerland) R Bertola (Italy) G Ferrari	3	3
2	(Ecuador) D Hidalgo (Spain) S Martos Gornés	6	6

Semifinals
1	(France) J Eysseric (Ukraine) D Molchanov	6	6
PR	(Romania) A Jecan (Greece) M Kalovelonis	3	1
3	(France) T Arribagé (France) L Sanchez	6	3	[10]
2	(Ecuador) D Hidalgo (Spain) S Martos Gornés	4	6	[7]

Final
1	(France) J Eysseric (Ukraine) D Molchanov	6	6
3	(France) T Arribagé (France) L Sanchez	2	4
