= 2023 Aspria Tennis Cup – Singles =

Singles
- 2023 Aspria Tennis Cup

Final
- Champion: (Argentina) Facundo Díaz Acosta
- Runner-up: (Italy) Matteo Gigante
- Score: 6–3, 6–3

Events
| Singles | Doubles |
| ← 2022 · | Aspria Tennis Cup | · 2024 → |

Federico Coria was the defending champion but chose not to defend his title.

Facundo Díaz Acosta won the title after defeating Matteo Gigante 6–3, 6–3 in the final.

== Seeds ==
1. (Argentina) Facundo Díaz Acosta (champion)
2. (Chile) Cristian Garín (first round)
3. (France) Hugo Grenier (first round)
4. (Argentina) Thiago Agustín Tirante (quarterfinals)
5. (Italy) Raúl Brancaccio (first round)
6. (Italy) Francesco Passaro (first round)
7. (Italy) Francesco Maestrelli (first round)
8. (Italy) Flavio Cobolli (semifinals)

== Draw ==
=== Key ===
- Q = Qualifier
- WC = Wild card
- LL = Lucky loser
- Alt = Alternate
- SE = Special exempt
- PR = Protected ranking
- ITF = ITF entry
- JE = Junior exempt
- w/o = Walkover
- r = Retired
- d = Defaulted
- SR = Special ranking

=== Finals ===
Semifinals
1 | (Argentina) Facundo Díaz Acosta | 6 | 4 | 6
8 | (Italy) Flavio Cobolli | 0 | 6 | 3
(Italy) Matteo Gigante | 6 | 3 | 7
(Italy) Luciano Darderi | 4 | 6 | 5

Final
1 | (Argentina) Facundo Díaz Acosta | 6 | 6
(Italy) Matteo Gigante | 3 | 3

=== Top half ===
First round
1 | (Argentina) F Díaz Acosta | 6 | 6
WC | (Italy) G Ferrari | 0 | 2
(Italy) S Travaglia | 3 | 6 | 4
PR | (Uruguay) P Cuevas | 6 | 2 | 6
WC | (Italy) Edoardo Lavagno | 6 | 3 | 4
(Belgium) G Onclin | 1 | 6 | 6
(Italy) A Giannessi | 6 | 3 | 6
7 | (Italy) F Maestrelli | 3 | 6 | 1
4 | (Argentina) TA Tirante | 6 | 7^{7}
(Italy) M Bellucci | 3 | 6^{2}
Q | (Italy) Federico Iannaccone | 6 | 4
(Argentina) R Olivo | 1 | 0^{r}
(Austria) M Neuchrist | 2 | 4
(Italy) F Gaio | 6 | 6
Q | (Czech Republic) M Vrbenský | 4 | 0
8 | (Italy) F Cobolli | 6 | 6

Second round
1 | (Argentina) F Díaz Acosta | 6 | 6
PR | (Uruguay) P Cuevas | 3 | 1
(Belgium) G Onclin | 6 | 6
(Italy) A Giannessi | 4 | 1
4 | (Argentina) TA Tirante | 6 | 6
Q | (Italy) F Iannaccone | 3 | 0
(Italy) F Gaio | 3 | 0
8 | (Italy) F Cobolli | 6 | 6

Quarterfinals
1 | (Argentina) F Díaz Acosta | 6 | 6
(Belgium) G Onclin | 4 | 3
4 | (Argentina) TA Tirante | 4 | 6 | 3
8 | (Italy) F Cobolli | 6 | 3 | 6

Semifinals
1 | (Argentina) F Díaz Acosta | 6 | 4 | 6
8 | (Italy) F Cobolli | 0 | 6 | 3

=== Bottom half ===
First round
6 | (Italy) F Passaro | 5 | 4
(Italy) M Gigante | 7 | 6
Q | (Italy) G Oradini | 6 | 1 | 6
(Ukraine) O Krutykh | 2 | 6 | 3
Q | (Italy) Marcello Serafini | 6 | 4 | 3
(Italy) L Nardi | 4 | 6 | 6
Q | (Italy) Alexander Weis | 6 | 6
3 | (France) H Grenier | 2 | 3
5 | (Italy) R Brancaccio | 1 | 7 | 0
(Argentina) L Midón | 6 | 5 | 6
Q | (Italy) F Forti | 6 | 3
(Italy) R Bonadio | 3 | 0^{r}
WC | (Italy) E Dalla Valle | 2 | 2^{r}
(Peru) G Bueno | 6 | 4
(Italy) L Darderi | 6 | 7
2 | (Chile) C Garín | 3 | 5

Second round
(Italy) M Gigante | 6 | 6
Q | (Italy) G Oradini | 1 | 2
(Italy) L Nardi | 1 | 7^{8} | 6
Q | (Italy) A Weis | 6 | 6^{6} | 2
(Argentina) L Midón | 6 | 4 | 6
Q | (Italy) F Forti | 3 | 6 | 4
(Peru) G Bueno | 6^{1} | 1
(Italy) L Darderi | 7^{7} | 6

Quarterfinals
(Italy) M Gigante | 4 | 7^{9} | 6
(Italy) L Nardi | 6 | 6^{7} | 4
(Argentina) L Midón | 2 | 0
(Italy) L Darderi | 6 | 6

Semifinals
(Italy) M Gigante | 6 | 3 | 7
(Italy) L Darderi | 4 | 6 | 5
