= 2025 Lisboa Belém Open – Women's doubles =

Women's doubles
- 2025 Lisboa Belém Open

Final
- Champions: (Portugal) Matilde Jorge (Switzerland) Naïma Karamoko
- Runners-up: (Slovenia) Dalila Jakupović (Slovenia) Nika Radišić
- Score: 6–2, 6–3

Events
Singles	men	women
Doubles	men	women
← 2024 ·	Lisboa Belém Open	· 2026 →

Francisca and Matilde Jorge were the defending champions but Francisca chose not to participate.

Matilde Jorge successfully defended her title with Naïma Karamoko, defeating Dalila Jakupović and Nika Radišić in the final, 6–2, 6–3.

== Seeds ==
1. (Italy) Angelica Moratelli / (Italy) Camilla Rosatello (quarterfinals)
2. Amina Anshba / (United Kingdom) Madeleine Brooks (semifinals)
3. (Portugal) Matilde Jorge / (Switzerland) Naïma Karamoko (champions)
4. (Slovenia) Dalila Jakupović / (Slovenia) Nika Radišić (final)

== Draw ==
Key

- Q = Qualifier
- WC = Wild card
- LL = Lucky loser
- Alt = Alternate
- ITF = ITF entry
- PR = Protected ranking
- SR = Special ranking
- SE = Special exempt
- JE = Junior exempt
- JR = Junior Accelerator Programme entrant
- CO = College Accelerator Programme entrant
- NG = Next Gen Accelerator Program entrant
- w/o = Walkover
- r = Retired
- d = Defaulted

First round
1	(Italy) A Moratelli (Italy) C Rosatello	6	6
(Portugal) S Lança (Ukraine) M Nozdrachova	0	1
E Ovcharenko (United Kingdom) E Webley-Smith	6	6
(Burundi) S Nahimana (France) A Robbe	3	4
4	(Slovenia) D Jakupović (Slovenia) N Radišić	6	1	'[10]
(Germany) T Morderger (Germany) Y Morderger	2	6	[2]
(Czech Republic) M Bayerlová (Algeria) I Ibbou	5	6	[10]
(Ukraine) M Kolb (Ukraine) N Kolb	7	2	[7]
(Spain) Y Cavallé Reimers (Georgia (country)) E Gorgodze	6	4	[10]
(Spain) M Martínez Vaquero (Spain) A Rey García	3	6	[7]
(Germany) L Böhner (Germany) G Dittmann	4	0
3	(Portugal) M Jorge (Switzerland) N Karamoko	6	6
(Portugal) T Franco Dias (Italy) V Losciale	5	7	[8]
(Portugal) AF Santos (Portugal) A Voloshchuk	7	5	[10]
(Spain) G Maristany (Spain) L Romero Gormaz	1^{r}
2	A Anshba (United Kingdom) M Brooks	2

Quarterfinals
1	(Italy) A Moratelli (Italy) C Rosatello	6	6^{7}	[6]
E Ovcharenko (United Kingdom) E Webley-Smith	3	7^{9}	[10]
4	(Slovenia) D Jakupović (Slovenia) N Radišić	6	6
(Czech Republic) M Bayerlová (Algeria) I Ibbou	4	2
(Spain) Y Cavallé Reimers (Georgia (country)) E Gorgodze	2	7^{7}	[8]
3	(Portugal) M Jorge (Switzerland) N Karamoko	6	6^{1}	[10]
(Portugal) AF Santos (Portugal) A Voloshchuk	0	3
2	A Anshba (United Kingdom) M Brooks	6	6

Semifinals
E Ovcharenko (United Kingdom) E Webley-Smith	4	4
4	(Slovenia) D Jakupović (Slovenia) N Radišić	6	6
3	(Portugal) M Jorge (Switzerland) N Karamoko	6	6
2	A Anshba (United Kingdom) M Brooks	2	3

Final
4	(Slovenia) D Jakupović (Slovenia) N Radišić	2	3
3	(Portugal) M Jorge (Switzerland) N Karamoko	6	6
