= 2023 Aspria Tennis Cup =

- Date: 3–9 July
- Edition: 17th
- Surface: Clay
- Location: Milan, Italy

Champions

Singles
- (Argentina) Facundo Díaz Acosta

Doubles
- (France) Jonathan Eysseric / (Ukraine) Denys Molchanov
← 2022 ·	Aspria Tennis Cup	· 2024 →

The 2023 Aspria Tennis Cup was a professional tennis tournament played on clay courts. It was the seventeenth edition of the tournament which was part of the 2023 ATP Challenger Tour. It took place in Milan, Italy between 3 and 9 July 2023.

== Singles main-draw entrants ==
=== Seeds ===
Country	Player	Rank^{1}	Seed
ARG	Facundo Díaz Acosta	114	1
CHI	Cristian Garín	124	2
FRA	Hugo Grenier	129	3
ARG	Thiago Agustín Tirante	132	4
ITA	Raúl Brancaccio	135	5
ITA	Francesco Passaro	148	6
ITA	Francesco Maestrelli	149	7
ITA	Flavio Cobolli	150	8

- ^{1} Rankings are as of 26 June 2023.

=== Other entrants ===
The following players received wildcards into the singles main draw:

- (Italy) Enrico Dalla Valle
- (Italy) Gianmarco Ferrari
- (Italy) Edoardo Lavagno

The following player received entry into the singles main draw using a protected ranking:

- (Uruguay) Pablo Cuevas

The following players received entry from the qualifying draw:

- (Italy) Francesco Forti
- (Italy) Federico Iannaccone
- (Italy) Giovanni Oradini
- (Italy) Marcello Serafini
- (Czech Republic) Michael Vrbenský
- (Italy) Alexander Weis

== Champions ==
=== Singles ===
- (Argentina) Facundo Díaz Acosta def. (Italy) Matteo Gigante 6–3, 6–3.

=== Doubles ===
- (France) Jonathan Eysseric / (Ukraine) Denys Molchanov def. (France) Théo Arribagé / (France) Luca Sanchez 6–2, 6–4.
