= 2025 Lisboa Belém Open – Women's singles =

Women's singles
- 2025 Lisboa Belém Open

Final
- Champion: (Switzerland) Simona Waltert
- Runner-up: (Latvia) Darja Semeņistaja
- Score: 6–2, 6–1

Events
Singles	men	women
Doubles	men	women
← 2024 ·	Lisboa Belém Open	· 2026 →

Victoria Jiménez Kasintseva was the defending champion but chose to compete in Beijing instead.

Simona Waltert won the title, defeating Darja Semeņistaja 6–2, 6–1 in the final.

== Seeds ==
1. (Latvia) Darja Semeņistaja (final)
2. (Switzerland) Simona Waltert (champion)
3. (Austria) Julia Grabher (semifinals)
4. Oksana Selekhmeteva (semifinals)
5. (Spain) Leyre Romero Gormaz (first round)
6. (Slovenia) Tamara Zidanšek (quarterfinals)
7. (Belgium) Hanne Vandewinkel (quarterfinals)
8. (Spain) Guiomar Maristany (quarterfinals)

== Draw ==
Key

- Q = Qualifier
- WC = Wild card
- LL = Lucky loser
- Alt = Alternate
- ITF = ITF entry
- PR = Protected ranking
- SR = Special ranking
- SE = Special exempt
- JE = Junior exempt
- JR = Junior Accelerator Programme entrant
- CO = College Accelerator Programme entrant
- NG = Next Gen Accelerator Program entrant
- w/o = Walkover
- r = Retired
- d = Defaulted

=== Finals ===
Semifinals
1	(Latvia) Darja Semeņistaja	6	6
3	(Austria) Julia Grabher	2	2
4	Oksana Selekhmeteva	3	3
2	(Switzerland) Simona Waltert	6	6

Final
1	(Latvia) Darja Semeņistaja	2	1
2	(Switzerland) Simona Waltert	6	6

=== Top half ===
First round
1	(Latvia) D Semeņistaja	6	6
(Italy) V Meliss	3	2
(Malta) F Curmi	6	2	6
(France) A Ramé	0	6	2
Q	(Germany) C Raschdorf	6	3	1
WC	(Portugal) AF Santos	4	6	6
(Georgia (country)) E Gorgodze	1	4
8	(Spain) G Maristany	6	6
3	(Austria) J Grabher	6	4
Q	(Poland) G Feistel	0	2^{r}
WC	(Portugal) T Franco Dias	3	1
(France) A Robbe	6	6
WC	(Portugal) S Lança	2	6^{6}
Q	A Anshba	6	7^{8}
(Germany) M Hodzic	4	5
6	(Slovenia) T Zidanšek	6	7

Second round
1	(Latvia) D Semeņistaja	6	6
(Malta) F Curmi	0	4
WC	(Portugal) AF Santos	1	0
8	(Spain) G Maristany	6	6
3	(Austria) J Grabher	6	6
(France) A Robbe	1	1
Q	A Anshba	2	5
6	(Slovenia) T Zidanšek	6	7

Quarterfinals
1	(Latvia) D Semeņistaja	6	6
8	(Spain) G Maristany	3	2
3	(Austria) J Grabher	6^{4}	6	6
6	(Slovenia) T Zidanšek	7^{7}	3	2

Semifinals
1	(Latvia) D Semeņistaja	6	6
3	(Austria) J Grabher	2	2

=== Bottom half ===
First round
5	(Spain) L Romero Gormaz	4	6	2
(France) M Lollia	6	3	6
Q	(Ukraine) N Kolb	6^{2}	7	0
(Italy) C Rosatello	7^{7}	5	6
(Slovenia) D Jakupović	7^{10}	2	6
E Ovcharenko	6^{8}	6	0
Q	(Germany) T Morderger	2	2
4	O Selekhmeteva	6	6
7	(Belgium) H Vandewinkel	6	6
(Burundi) S Nahimana	4	4
(Portugal) M Jorge	5	1
Q	(France) A Lim	7	6
Q	(Germany) G Dittmann	4	7^{7}	2
WC	(Portugal) A Voloshchuk	6	6^{5}	6
Q	(Spain) M Martínez Vaquero	2	3
2	(Switzerland) S Waltert	6	6

Second round
(France) M Lollia	2	3
(Italy) C Rosatello	6	6
(Slovenia) D Jakupović	1	4
4	O Selekhmeteva	6	6
7	(Belgium) H Vandewinkel	6	3
Q	(France) A Lim	3	2^{r}
WC	(Portugal) A Voloshchuk	1	5
2	(Switzerland) S Waltert	6	7

Quarterfinals
(Italy) C Rosatello	3	5
4	O Selekhmeteva	6	7
7	(Belgium) H Vandewinkel	0	5
2	(Switzerland) S Waltert	6	7

Semifinals
4	O Selekhmeteva	3	3
2	(Switzerland) S Waltert	6	6
