= 2025 Lisboa Belém Open – Men's singles =

Men's singles
- 2025 Lisboa Belém Open

Final
- Champion: (Lithuania) Vilius Gaubas
- Runner-up: (Portugal) Henrique Rocha
- Score: 6–7^{(3–7)}, 6–3, 6–4

Events
Singles	men	women
Doubles	men	women
← 2024 ·	Lisboa Belém Open	· 2026 →

Alexander Ritschard was the defending champion but lost in the quarterfinals to Stefano Travaglia.

Vilius Gaubas won the title after defeating Henrique Rocha 6–7^{(3–7)}, 6–3, 6–4 in the final.

== Seeds ==
1. (Czech Republic) Vít Kopřiva (second round)
2. (Spain) Carlos Taberner (first round)
3. (Spain) Roberto Carballés Baena (second round, retired)
4. (Peru) Ignacio Buse (semifinals)
5. (Denmark) Elmer Møller (first round)
6. (Portugal) Jaime Faria (second round)
7. (Colombia) Daniel Elahi Galán (first round)
8. (Italy) Andrea Pellegrino (first round)

== Draw ==
Key

- Q = Qualifier
- WC = Wild card
- LL = Lucky loser
- Alt = Alternate
- ITF = ITF entry
- PR = Protected ranking
- SR = Special ranking
- SE = Special exempt
- JE = Junior exempt
- JR = Junior Accelerator Programme entrant
- CO = College Accelerator Programme entrant
- NG = Next Gen Accelerator Program entrant
- w/o = Walkover
- r = Retired
- d = Defaulted

=== Finals ===
Semifinals
Alt	(Italy) Stefano Travaglia	6	4	6^{3}
(Portugal) Henrique Rocha	4	6	7^{7}
4	(Peru) Ignacio Buse	5	6^{4}
(Lithuania) Vilius Gaubas	7	7^{7}

Final
(Portugal) Henrique Rocha	7^{7}	3	4
(Lithuania) Vilius Gaubas	6^{3}	6	6

=== Top half ===
First round
1	(Czech Republic) V Kopřiva	6	6
(France) L Pavlovic	3	4
Q	(Switzerland) A Ritschard	6	6
NG	(Austria) J Schwärzler	2	1
Alt	(Italy) S Travaglia	6	6
NG	(Croatia) M Dodig	3	3
Q	(Germany) C Negritu	4	6	2
6	(Portugal) J Faria	6	4	6
3	(Spain) R Carballés Baena	6	6
(Brazil) T Seyboth Wild	3	2
Q	(Spain) P Llamas Ruiz	6	7^{7}
Q	(Spain) A Moro Cañas	4	6^{5}
WC	(Portugal) Pedro Araújo	4	3
(Portugal) H Rocha	6	6
(United Kingdom) J Choinski	6	3	6
8	(Italy) A Pellegrino	2	6	1

Second round
1	(Czech Republic) V Kopřiva	4	2
Q	(Switzerland) A Ritschard	6	6
Alt	(Italy) S Travaglia	6	5	6
6	(Portugal) J Faria	1	7	4
3	(Spain) R Carballés Baena	4	0^{r}
Q	(Spain) P Llamas Ruiz	6	3
(Portugal) H Rocha	6	6
(United Kingdom) J Choinski	1	4

Quarterfinals
Q	(Switzerland) A Ritschard	2	6	6^{5}
Alt	(Italy) S Travaglia	6	1	7^{7}
Q	(Spain) P Llamas Ruiz	3	4
(Portugal) H Rocha	6	6

Semifinals
Alt	(Italy) S Travaglia	6	4	6^{3}
(Portugal) H Rocha	4	6	7^{7}

=== Bottom half ===
First round
7	(Colombia) DE Galán	2	6^{3}
(Argentina) M Trungelliti	6	7^{7}
(Netherlands) G den Ouden	7	6
Alt	(Sweden) E Ymer	5	3
Q	(Italy) M Cecchinato	6^{1}	6^{2}
(Brazil) T Monteiro	7^{7}	7^{7}
Q	(Portugal) Francisco Rocha	3	0
4	(Peru) I Buse	6	6
5	(Denmark) E Møller	5	5
WC	(Portugal) T Pereira	7	7
(Spain) D Mérida	6	4	6
(Switzerland) J Kym	2	6	4
WC	(Portugal) F Ferreira Silva	6	1	6
(United Kingdom) J Clarke	3	6	1
(Lithuania) V Gaubas	6	6
2	(Spain) C Taberner	1	4

Second round
(Argentina) M Trungelliti	6	6
(Netherlands) G den Ouden	1	2
(Brazil) T Monteiro	6^{7}	4
4	(Peru) I Buse	7^{9}	6
WC	(Portugal) T Pereira	2	3
(Spain) D Mérida	6	6
WC	(Portugal) F Ferreira Silva	5	6^{5}
(Lithuania) V Gaubas	7	7^{7}

Quarterfinals
(Argentina) M Trungelliti	4	6	3
4	(Peru) I Buse	6	3	6
(Spain) D Mérida	1	4
(Lithuania) V Gaubas	6	6

Semifinals
4	(Peru) I Buse	5	6^{4}
(Lithuania) V Gaubas	7	7^{7}
