= 2025 Garden Open =

- Date: 21 – 27 April
- Edition: 17th
- Surface: Clay
- Location: Rome, Italy

Champions

Singles
- (Italy) Matteo Gigante

Doubles
- (Sweden) Erik Grevelius / (Sweden) Adam Heinonen
- Garden Open

The 2025 Roma Garden Open was a professional tennis tournament played on clay courts. It was the 17th edition of the tournament which was part of the 2025 ATP Challenger Tour. It took place in Rome, Italy between 21 and 27 April 2025.

== Singles main-draw entrants ==
=== Seeds ===
Country	Player	Rank^{1}	Seed
LTU	Vilius Gaubas	144	1
CRO	Duje Ajduković	170	2
LIB	Hady Habib	178	3
KAZ	Timofey Skatov	179	4
AUT	Lukas Neumayer	195	5
FRA	Arthur Bouquier	199	6
ITA	Matteo Gigante	200	7
ITA	Federico Arnaboldi	204	8

- ^{1} Rankings as of 21 April 2025.

=== Other entrants ===
The following players received wildcards into the singles main draw:

- (Italy) Lorenzo Carboni
- (Italy) Gabriele Pennaforti
- (Italy) Jacopo Vasamì

The following players received entry into the singles main draw as alternates:

- (Switzerland) Rémy Bertola
- (Italy) Francesco Maestrelli
- (Croatia) Mili Poljičak

The following players received entry from the qualifying draw:

- (Switzerland) Mika Brunold
- (Belgium) Kimmer Coppejans
- (Austria) Sandro Kopp
- (Slovakia) Lukáš Pokorný
- (Ukraine) Oleg Prihodko
- (Italy) Stefano Travaglia

== Champions ==
=== Singles ===
- (Italy) Matteo Gigante def. (Lithuania) Vilius Gaubas 6–2, 3–6, 6–4.

=== Doubles ===
- (Sweden) Erik Grevelius / (Sweden) Adam Heinonen def. (Italy) Marco Bortolotti / (Italy) Giorgio Ricca 7–6^{(7–2)}, 7–5.
