= 2025 Garden Open – Singles =

Singles
- 2025 Garden Open

Final
- Champion: (Italy) Matteo Gigante
- Runner-up: (Lithuania) Vilius Gaubas
- Score: 6–2, 3–6, 6–4

Events
| Singles | Doubles |
- Garden Open

Alejandro Moro Cañas was the defending champion but chose not to defend his title.

Matteo Gigante won the title after defeating Vilius Gaubas 6–2, 3–6, 6–4 in the final.

== Seeds ==
1. (Lithuania) Vilius Gaubas (final)
2. (Croatia) Duje Ajduković (first round)
3. (Lebanon) Hady Habib (second round)
4. (Kazakhstan) Timofey Skatov (quarterfinals)
5. (Austria) Lukas Neumayer (semifinals)
6. (France) Arthur Bouquier (first round)
7. (Italy) Matteo Gigante (champion)
8. (Italy) Federico Arnaboldi (quarterfinals)

== Draw ==
Key

- Q = Qualifier
- WC = Wild card
- LL = Lucky loser
- Alt = Alternate
- ITF = ITF entry
- PR = Protected ranking
- SR = Special ranking
- SE = Special exempt
- JE = Junior exempt
- JR = Junior Accelerator Programme entrant
- CO = College Accelerator Programme entrant
- NG = Next Gen Accelerator Program entrant
- w/o = Walkover
- r = Retired
- d = Defaulted

=== Finals ===
Semifinals
1 | (Lithuania) Vilius Gaubas | 4 | 6 | 6
5 | (Austria) Lukas Neumayer | 6 | 3 | 1
Q | (Austria) Sandro Kopp
7 | (Italy) Matteo Gigante | w/o

Final
1 | (Lithuania) Vilius Gaubas | 2 | 6 | 4
7 | (Italy) Matteo Gigante | 6 | 3 | 6

=== Top half ===
First round
1 | (Lithuania) V Gaubas | 3 | 6 | 6
(Uzbekistan) K Sultanov | 6 | 4 | 2
(Spain) O Roca Batalla | 7 | 6^{6} | 3
Q | (Ukraine) O Prihodko | 5 | 7^{8} | 6
(Italy) A Pellegrino | 5 | 6 | 6
WC | (Italy) J Vasamì | 7 | 4 | 4
Alt | (Switzerland) R Bertola | 7^{7} | 6
6 | (France) A Bouquier | 6^{5} | 1
4 | (Kazakhstan) T Skatov | 7^{7} | 6
(France) Antoine Cornut-Chauvinc | 6^{1} | 4
(United Kingdom) P Jubb | 4 | 2
Q | (Italy) S Travaglia | 6 | 6
(Dominican Republic) N Hardt | 4 | 3
Q | (Slovakia) L Pokorný | 6 | 6
Alt | (Croatia) M Poljičak | 4 | 4
5 | (Austria) L Neumayer | 6 | 6

Second round
1 | (Lithuania) V Gaubas | 6 | 6
Q | (Ukraine) O Prihodko | 2 | 2
(Italy) A Pellegrino | 1 | 6 | 6
Alt | (Switzerland) R Bertola | 6 | 3 | 4
4 | (Kazakhstan) T Skatov | w/o
Q | (Italy) S Travaglia
Q | (Slovakia) L Pokorný | 2 | 1
5 | (Austria) L Neumayer | 6 | 6

Quarterfinals
1 | (Lithuania) V Gaubas | 6 | 4 | 6
(Italy) A Pellegrino | 3 | 6 | 4
4 | (Kazakhstan) T Skatov | 3 | 6^{3}
5 | (Austria) L Neumayer | 6 | 7^{7}

Semifinals
1 | (Lithuania) V Gaubas | 4 | 6 | 6
5 | (Austria) L Neumayer | 6 | 3 | 1

=== Bottom half ===
First round
8 | (Italy) F Arnaboldi | 6 | 5 | 6
WC | (Italy) Gabriele Pennaforti | 3 | 7 | 2
(Jordan) A Shelbayh | 4 | 2
(Bulgaria) D Kuzmanov | 6 | 6
Q | (Austria) S Kopp | 6 | 6
(Kazakhstan) D Yevseyev | 4 | 4
Q | (Switzerland) M Brunold | 4 | 5
3 | (Lebanon) H Habib | 6 | 7
7 | (Italy) M Gigante | 3 | 6 | 6
(Italy) L Giustino | 6 | 1 | 2
Q | (Belgium) K Coppejans | 6 | 6
(Switzerland) D Stricker | 2 | 2
Alt | (Italy) F Maestrelli | 7 | 2 | 7^{7}
(Germany) H Squire | 5 | 6 | 6^{3}
WC | (Italy) Lorenzo Carboni | 3 | 6 | 6
2 | (Croatia) D Ajduković | 6 | 1 | 4

Second round
8 | (Italy) F Arnaboldi | 6 | 2 | 6
(Bulgaria) D Kuzmanov | 3 | 6 | 2
Q | (Austria) S Kopp | 7 | 7^{7}
3 | (Lebanon) H Habib | 5 | 6^{3}
7 | (Italy) M Gigante | 5 | 6 | 6
Q | (Belgium) K Coppejans | 7 | 4 | 1
Alt | (Italy) F Maestrelli | 3 | 6 | 6
WC | (Italy) L Carboni | 6 | 4 | 2

Quarterfinals
8 | (Italy) F Arnaboldi | 2 | 4
Q | (Austria) S Kopp | 6 | 6
7 | (Italy) M Gigante | 6^{6} | 6 | 6
Alt | (Italy) F Maestrelli | 7^{8} | 1 | 3

Semifinals
Q | (Austria) S Kopp
7 | (Italy) M Gigante | w/o
