= 2025 Lisboa Belém Open =

- Date: 22–28 September
- Edition: 9th (men); 5th (women)
- Category: ATP Challenger Tour 100; ITF Women's World Tennis Tour
- Surface: Clay / Outdoor
- Location: Lisbon, Portugal

Champions

Men's singles
- (Lithuania) Vilius Gaubas

Women's singles
- (Switzerland) Simona Waltert

Men's doubles
- (Spain) Pablo Llamas Ruiz / (Spain) Sergio Martos Gornés

Women's doubles
- (Portugal) Matilde Jorge / (Switzerland) Naïma Karamoko
- Lisboa Belém Open

The 2025 Del Monte Lisboa Belém Open was a professional tennis tournament played on outdoor clay courts. It was the ninth and fifth editions (for men and women, respectively) of the tournament, which was part of the 2025 ATP Challenger Tour and the 2025 ITF Women's World Tennis Tour. It took place in Lisbon, Portugal, between 22 and 28 September 2025.

== Champions ==
=== Men's singles ===
- (Lithuania) Vilius Gaubas def. (Portugal) Henrique Rocha 6–7^{(3–7)}, 6–3, 6–4.

=== Women's singles ===
- (Switzerland) Simona Waltert def. (Latvia) Darja Semeņistaja, 6–2, 6–1

=== Men's doubles ===
- (Spain) Pablo Llamas Ruiz / (Spain) Sergio Martos Gornés def. (Romania) Alexandru Jecan / (Romania) Bogdan Pavel 7–6^{(7–5)}, 6–4.

=== Women's doubles ===
- (Portugal) Matilde Jorge / (Switzerland) Naïma Karamoko def. (Slovenia) Dalila Jakupović / (Slovenia) Nika Radišić, 6–2, 6–3

== Men's singles main draw entrants ==
=== Seeds ===
Country	Player	Rank^{1}	Seed
CZE	Vít Kopřiva	102	1
ESP	Carlos Taberner	104	2
ESP	Roberto Carballés Baena	110	3
PER	Ignacio Buse	113	4
DEN	Elmer Møller	115	5
POR	Jaime Faria	118	6
COL	Daniel Elahi Galán	130	7
ITA	Andrea Pellegrino	135	8

- ^{1} Rankings are as of 15 September 2025.

=== Other entrants ===
The following players received wildcards into the singles main draw:

- (Portugal) Pedro Araújo
- (Portugal) Frederico Ferreira Silva
- (Portugal) Tiago Pereira

The following players received entry into the singles main draw through the Next Gen Accelerator programme:

- (Croatia) Matej Dodig
- (Austria) Joel Schwärzler

The following players received entry into the singles main draw as alternates:

- (Italy) Stefano Travaglia
- (Sweden) Elias Ymer

The following players received entry from the qualifying draw:

- (Italy) Marco Cecchinato
- (Spain) Pablo Llamas Ruiz
- (Spain) Alejandro Moro Cañas
- (Germany) Christoph Negritu
- (Switzerland) Alexander Ritschard
- (Portugal) Francisco Rocha

== Women's singles main draw entrants ==
=== Seeds ===
Country	Player	Rank	Seed
LAT	Darja Semeņistaja	106	1
SUI	Simona Waltert	117	2
AUT	Julia Grabher	122	3
	Oksana Selekhmeteva	126	4
ESP	Leyre Romero Gormaz	127	5
SLO	Tamara Zidanšek	152	6
BEL	Hanne Vandewinkel	162	7
ESP	Guiomar Maristany	183	8

- Rankings are as of 15 September 2025.

=== Other entrants ===
The following players received wildcards into the singles main draw:

- (Portugal) Teresa Franco Dias
- (Portugal) Sara Lança
- (Portugal) Ana Filipa Santos
- (Portugal) Angelina Voloshchuk

The following players received entry from the qualifying draw:

- Amina Anshba
- (Germany) Gina Marie Dittmann
- (Poland) Gina Feistel
- (Ukraine) Nadiia Kolb
- (France) Alizé Lim
- (Spain) María Martínez Vaquero
- (Germany) Tayisiya Morderger
- (Germany) Carolin Raschdorf
