= 2025 Aspria Tennis Cup – Singles =

Singles
- 2025 Aspria Tennis Cup

Final
- Champion: (Italy) Marco Cecchinato
- Runner-up: (Croatia) Dino Prižmić
- Score: 6–2, 6–3

Events
Singles	Doubles
- Aspria Tennis Cup

Federico Agustín Gómez was the defending champion but chose to compete in Wimbledon qualifying.

Marco Cecchinato won the title after defeating Dino Prižmić 6–2, 6–3 in the final.

== Seeds ==
1. (Croatia) Dino Prižmić (final)
2. (Belgium) Kimmer Coppejans (first round)
3. (Netherlands) Max Houkes (quarterfinals)
4. (Chile) Matías Soto (first round)
5. (Mexico) Rodrigo Pacheco Méndez (first round)
6. (Portugal) Frederico Ferreira Silva (second round)
7. (Croatia) Mili Poljičak (second round)
8. Ivan Gakhov (second round)

== Draw ==
Key

- Q = Qualifier
- WC = Wild card
- LL = Lucky loser
- Alt = Alternate
- ITF = ITF entry
- PR = Protected ranking
- SR = Special ranking
- SE = Special exempt
- JE = Junior exempt
- JR = Junior Accelerator Programme entrant
- CO = College Accelerator Programme entrant
- NG = Next Gen Accelerator Program entrant
- w/o = Walkover
- r = Retired
- d = Defaulted

=== Finals ===
Semifinals
1	(Croatia) Dino Prižmić	3	6	6
JR	(Spain) Rafael Jódar	6	3	2
WC	(Italy) Marco Cecchinato	6	6
WC	(Italy) Jacopo Vasamì	3	3

Final
1	(Croatia) Dino Prižmić	2	3
WC	(Italy) Marco Cecchinato	6	6

=== Top half ===
First round
1	(Croatia) D Prižmić	6	6
WC	(Italy) G Piraino	1	4
Q	(Italy) J Berrettini	7^{7}	0
(Germany) H Squire	6^{5}	0^{r}
(France) Mathys Erhard	6	6^{7}	4
(Germany) C Negritu	2	7^{9}	6
(Slovakia) A Martin	6	1	6^{3}
8	I Gakhov	3	6	7^{7}
4	(Chile) M Soto	3	6	3
LL	(Portugal) T Pereira	6	4	6
JR	(Spain) R Jódar	6	6
(Italy) L Giustino	0	2
NG	(Germany) D Dedura	6^{4}	1
(France) A Géa	7^{7}	6
Alt	(Spain) O Roca Batalla	4	6	6
5	(Mexico) R Pacheco Méndez	6	4	1

Second round
1	(Croatia) D Prižmić	6	6
Q	(Italy) J Berrettini	1	2
(Germany) C Negritu	6	6
8	I Gakhov	3	4
LL	(Portugal) T Pereira	6	5	1
JR	(Spain) R Jódar	4	7	6
(France) A Géa	6	1	6
Alt	(Spain) O Roca Batalla	4	6	3

Quarterfinals
1	(Croatia) D Prižmić	6	6
(Germany) C Negritu	4	3
JR	(Spain) R Jódar	6	2	6
(France) A Géa	0	6	3

Semifinals
1	(Croatia) D Prižmić	3	6	6
JR	(Spain) R Jódar	6	3	2

=== Bottom half ===
First round
6	(Portugal) F Ferreira Silva	6	1
A Vatutin	3	1^{r}
WC	(Italy) M Cecchinato	6	6
Q	(Spain) M Alcalá Gurri	4	1
Q	(France) T Faurel	6	2	6
Q	(Italy) F Bondioli	3	6	2
Q	(Italy) G Fonio	6	3	6^{5}
3	(Netherlands) M Houkes	3	6	7^{7}
7	(Croatia) M Poljičak	6	5	6
(Italy) S Travaglia	2	7	2
Q	(Spain) A Santamarta Roig	3	5
WC	(Italy) J Vasamì	6	7
Alt	(Ukraine) O Prihodko	6	6
(Moldova) R Albot	3	4
(Croatia) L Mikrut	6	6
2	(Belgium) K Coppejans	4	4

Second round
6	(Portugal) F Ferreira Silva	3	0
WC	(Italy) M Cecchinato	6	6
Q	(France) T Faurel	6	0	2
3	(Netherlands) M Houkes	2	6	6
7	(Croatia) M Poljičak	6	1	5
WC	(Italy) J Vasamì	3	6	7
Alt	(Ukraine) O Prihodko	3	1
(Croatia) L Mikrut	6	6

Quarterfinals
WC	(Italy) M Cecchinato	6	6
3	(Netherlands) M Houkes	4	2
WC	(Italy) J Vasamì	3	7^{7}	6
(Croatia) L Mikrut	6	6^{4}	2

Semifinals
WC	(Italy) M Cecchinato	6	6
WC	(Italy) J Vasamì	3	3
