= 2025 Open Menorca =

- Date: 31 March – 6 April
- Edition: 1st
- Surface: Clay
- Location: Menorca, Spain

Champions

Singles
- (Lithuania) Vilius Gaubas

Doubles
- (Lebanon) Benjamin Hassan / (Austria) Sebastian Ofner
- Open Menorca

The 2025 Open Menorca was a professional tennis tournament played on clay courts. It was the first edition of the tournament which was part of the 2025 ATP Challenger Tour. It took place at the Club Tenis Ciutadella in Menorca, Spain between 31 March and 6 April 2025.

== Singles main-draw entrants ==
=== Seeds ===
Country	Player	Rank^{1}	Seed
GBR	Billy Harris	107	1
AUT	Sebastian Ofner	131	2
CRO	Marin Čilić	143	3
DEN	Elmer Møller	156	4
ESP	Carlos Taberner	170	5
GBR	Jan Choinski	178	6
LTU	Vilius Gaubas	194	7
LTU	Edas Butvilas	201	8

- ^{1} Rankings are as of 17 March 2025.

=== Other entrants ===
The following players received wildcards into the singles main draw:

- (Spain) Nicolás Álvarez Varona
- (Argentina) Pedro Cachin
- (Italy) Felipe Virgili

The following player received entry into the singles main draw as a special exempt:

- (Denmark) Elmer Møller

The following player received entry into the singles main draw as an alternate:

- (Kazakhstan) Denis Yevseyev

The following players received entry from the qualifying draw:

- (Spain) Max Alcalá Gurri
- (South Korea) Gerard Campaña Lee
- (Belgium) Kimmer Coppejans
- (Switzerland) Kilian Feldbausch
- (Spain) Daniel Mérida
- (Hungary) Zsombor Piros

== Champions ==
=== Singles ===
- (Lithuania) Vilius Gaubas def. (Spain) Pol Martín Tiffon 6–0, 6–4.

=== Doubles ===
- (Lebanon) Benjamin Hassan / (Austria) Sebastian Ofner def. (Italy) Andrea Vavassori / (Italy) Matteo Vavassori 7–5, 6–3.
