= 2026 Open Menorca =

- Date: 30 March – 5 April
- Edition: 2nd
- Surface: Clay
- Location: Menorca, Spain

Champions

Singles
- (Italy) Raúl Brancaccio

Doubles
- (Thailand) Pruchya Isaro / (India) Niki Kaliyanda Poonacha
- Open Menorca

The 2026 Open Menorca was a professional tennis tournament played on clay courts. It was the second edition of the tournament which was part of the 2026 ATP Challenger Tour. It took place at the Club Tenis Ciutadella in Menorca, Spain between 30 March and 5 April 2026.

== Singles main-draw entrants ==
=== Seeds ===
Country	Player	Rank^{1}	Seed
FRA	Valentin Royer	69	1
AUT	Sebastian Ofner	86	2
ESP	Martín Landaluce	151	3
ITA	Giulio Zeppieri	160	4
ESP	Roberto Carballés Baena	165	5
CZE	Zdeněk Kolář	183	6
GER	Justin Engel	190	7
POR	Frederico Ferreira Silva	238	8

- ^{1} Rankings are as of 16 March 2026.

=== Other entrants ===
The following players received wildcards into the singles main draw:

- (Spain) Alejo Sánchez Quílez
- (Italy) Felipe Virgili
- (Spain) Pedro Vives Marcos

The following players received entry into the singles main draw as alternates:

- (Italy) Raúl Brancaccio
- (Czech Republic) Jonáš Forejtek

The following players received entry from the qualifying draw:

- (United States) Dali Blanch
- (Spain) Sergio Callejón Hernando
- Yaroslav Demin
- (Spain) Àlex Martínez
- (Spain) Iñaki Montes de la Torre
- (Czech Republic) Andrew Paulson

== Champions ==
=== Singles ===
- (Italy) Raúl Brancaccio def. (Spain) Àlex Martínez 6–1, 6–4.

=== Doubles ===
- (Thailand) Pruchya Isaro / (India) Niki Kaliyanda Poonacha def. (India) Siddhant Banthia / (Bulgaria) Alexander Donski 6–3, 7–6^{(7–3)}.
