= 2023 Garden Open – Doubles =

Doubles
- 2023 Garden Open

Final
- Champions: (Colombia) Nicolás Barrientos (Portugal) Francisco Cabral
- Runners-up: (Kazakhstan) Andrey Golubev (Ukraine) Denys Molchanov
- Score: 6–3, 6–1

Events
Singles	Doubles
← 2022 ·	Garden Open	· 2024 →

Jesper de Jong and Bart Stevens were the defending champions but chose not to defend their title.

Nicolás Barrientos and Francisco Cabral won the title after defeating Andrey Golubev and Denys Molchanov 6–3, 6–1 in the final.

== Seeds ==
1. (France) Sadio Doumbia / (France) Fabien Reboul (semifinals, withdrew)
2. (Colombia) Nicolás Barrientos / (Portugal) Francisco Cabral (champions)
3. (India) Yuki Bhambri / (India) Saketh Myneni (quarterfinals)
4. (Ecuador) Diego Hidalgo / (Finland) Patrik Niklas-Salminen (quarterfinals)

== Draw ==
=== Key ===
- Q = Qualifier
- WC = Wild card
- LL = Lucky loser
- Alt = Alternate
- SE = Special exempt
- PR = Protected ranking
- ITF = ITF entry
- JE = Junior exempt
- w/o = Walkover
- r = Retired
- d = Defaulted
- SR = Special ranking

First round
1	(France) S Doumbia (France) F Reboul	6	6
(Poland) P Matuszewski (New Zealand) A Sitak	1	2
4	(Ecuador) D Hidalgo (Finland) P Niklas-Salminen	6	7^{7}
(Belgium) J De Loore (Belgium) M Geerts	4	6^{4}
WC	(Italy) Alessio Balestrieri (Italy) Giammarco Gandolfi	0	1
(Kazakhstan) A Golubev (Ukraine) D Molchanov	6	6
Alt	(Uzbekistan) D Istomin; E Karlovskiy	7^{7}	5	[2]
(Norway) V Durasovic (Brazil) F Romboli	6^{4}	7	[10]
(Italy) F Forti (Italy) F Maestrelli
3	(India) Y Bhambri (India) S Myneni	w/o
(France) J Eysseric (Pakistan) A-u-H Qureshi	6	7^{7}
(Australia) A Taylor (Australia) J Taylor	3	6^{3}
(Germany) C Frantzen (Germany) H Jebens	4	7^{8}	[7]
2	(Colombia) N Barrientos (Portugal) F Cabral	6	6^{6}	[10]

Quarterfinals
1	(France) S Doumbia (France) F Reboul	7^{7}	6
(Spain) Í Cervantes (Spain) O Roca Batalla	6^{2}	3
4	(Ecuador) D Hidalgo (Finland) P Niklas-Salminen	3	6	[4]
(Kazakhstan) A Golubev (Ukraine) D Molchanov	6	2	[10]
(Norway) V Durasovic (Brazil) F Romboli	7^{7}	4	[10]
3	(India) Y Bhambri (India) S Myneni	6^{3}	6	[8]
(France) J Eysseric (Pakistan) A-u-H Qureshi	6^{5}	6	[8]
2	(Colombia) N Barrientos (Portugal) F Cabral	7^{7}	4	[10]

Semifinals
1	(France) S Doumbia (France) F Reboul
(Kazakhstan) A Golubev (Ukraine) D Molchanov	w/o
(Norway) V Durasovic (Brazil) F Romboli	6^{5}	0
2	(Colombia) N Barrientos (Portugal) F Cabral	7^{7}	6

Final
(Kazakhstan) A Golubev (Ukraine) D Molchanov	3	1
2	(Colombia) N Barrientos (Portugal) F Cabral	6	6
