= Luigi Sorrentino =

Italian footballer

Personal information
- Full name: Luigi Sorrentino
- Date of birth: January 30, 1991 (age 35)
- Place of birth: Naples, Italy
- Height: 1.85 m (6 ft 1 in)
- Position: Goalkeeper

Team information
- Current team: ASCD SAVIANO 1960

Youth career
- Napoli

Senior career*
Years	Team	Apps	(Gls)
2009–2011	Napoli	0	(0)
2009–2010	→ Nardò (loan)	30	(0)
2010–2011	→ Pomigliano (loan)	31	(0)
2011–2013	Monza	0	(0)
2011–2012	→ Giulianova (loan)	8	(0)
2013–2014	Olbia	13	(0)
2014–2015	US Palmese 1914	30	(0)
2015–2017	Sarnese	65	(0)
2017–2018	Portici 1906	19	(0)
2018	Gragnano	13	(0)
2018–2019	Pomigliano	16	(0)
2019–	Scafatese		
- * Club domestic league appearances and goals as of 14:28, 8 February 2020 (UTC)

Luigi Sorrentino (born 30 January 1991 in Naples) is an Italian goalkeeper who currently plays for ASCD SAVIANO 1960.

== Career ==
=== Scafatese ===
In September 2019 it was confirmed, that Sorrentino had joined Italian club S.S. Scafatese Calcio 1922.
