= 2025 Garden Open – Doubles =

Doubles
- 2025 Garden Open

Final
- Champions: (Sweden) Erik Grevelius (Sweden) Adam Heinonen
- Runners-up: (Italy) Marco Bortolotti (Italy) Giorgio Ricca
- Score: 7–6^{(7–2)}, 7–5

Events
| Singles | Doubles |
- Garden Open

Luke Johnson and Skander Mansouri were the defending champions but chose not to defend their title.

Erik Grevelius and Adam Heinonen won the title after defeating Marco Bortolotti and Giorgio Ricca 7–6^{(7–2)}, 7–5 in the final.

== Seeds ==
1. (Italy) Marco Bortolotti / (Italy) Giorgio Ricca (final)
2. (India) Siddhant Banthia / (Bulgaria) Alexander Donski (quarterfinals)
3. (Netherlands) Mats Hermans / (Portugal) Tiago Pereira (quarterfinals)
4. (New Zealand) Finn Reynolds / (New Zealand) James Watt (quarterfinals)

== Draw ==
Key

- Q = Qualifier
- WC = Wild card
- LL = Lucky loser
- Alt = Alternate
- ITF = ITF entry
- PR = Protected ranking
- SR = Special ranking
- SE = Special exempt
- JE = Junior exempt
- JR = Junior Accelerator Programme entrant
- CO = College Accelerator Programme entrant
- NG = Next Gen Accelerator Program entrant
- w/o = Walkover
- r = Retired
- d = Defaulted

=== Draw ===
First round
1 | (Italy) M Bortolotti (Italy) G Ricca | 4 | 6 | [18]
(Jordan) A Shelbayh (Kazakhstan) D Yevseyev | 6 | 0 | [16]
WC | (Italy) J Berrettini (Italy) R Brancaccio | 6 | 7^{9}
(Czech Republic) J Jermář (Germany) T Rühl | 0 | 6^{7}
4 | (New Zealand) F Reynolds (New Zealand) J Watt | 7^{7} | 4 | [10]
(France) J Eysseric (Italy) A Pellegrino | 6^{5} | 6 | [5]
(Uzbekistan) K Sultanov (Ukraine) V Uzhylovskyi | 5 | 1
(Slovakia) L Pokorný (Spain) O Roca Batalla | 7 | 6
(United Kingdom) Liam Hignett (United Kingdom) J MacKinlay | 5 | 2
(Sweden) E Grevelius (Sweden) A Heinonen | 7 | 6
(Italy) F Maestrelli (Italy) Gabriele Pennaforti | 6^{5} | 4
3 | (Netherlands) M Hermans (Portugal) T Pereira | 7^{7} | 6
(Italy) Simone Agostini (Canada) K Stevenson | 6 | 6
WC | (Italy) Jacopo Bilardo (Italy) J Vasamì | 4 | 3
(Italy) F Arnaboldi (Switzerland) R Bertola | 3 | 4
2 | (India) S Banthia (Bulgaria) A Donski | 6 | 6

Quarterfinals
1 | (Italy) M Bortolotti (Italy) G Ricca | 6 | 6
WC | (Italy) J Berrettini (Italy) R Brancaccio | 4 | 4
4 | (New Zealand) F Reynolds (New Zealand) J Watt | 6^{5} | 5
(Slovakia) L Pokorný (Spain) O Roca Batalla | 7^{7} | 7
(Sweden) E Grevelius (Sweden) A Heinonen | 6 | 7^{9}
3 | (Netherlands) M Hermans (Portugal) T Pereira | 4 | 6^{7}
(Italy) S Agostini (Canada) K Stevenson | 6 | 3 | [11]
2 | (India) S Banthia (Bulgaria) A Donski | 4 | 6 | [9]

Semifinals
1 | (Italy) M Bortolotti (Italy) G Ricca | 7^{8} | 7
(Slovakia) L Pokorný (Spain) O Roca Batalla | 6^{6} | 5
(Sweden) E Grevelius (Sweden) A Heinonen | 6 | 7^{12}
(Italy) S Agostini (Canada) K Stevenson | 4 | 6^{10}

Final
1 | (Italy) M Bortolotti (Italy) G Ricca | 6^{2} | 5
(Sweden) E Grevelius (Sweden) A Heinonen | 7^{7} | 7
