= Matteo Gigante =

Italian tennis player (born 2002)

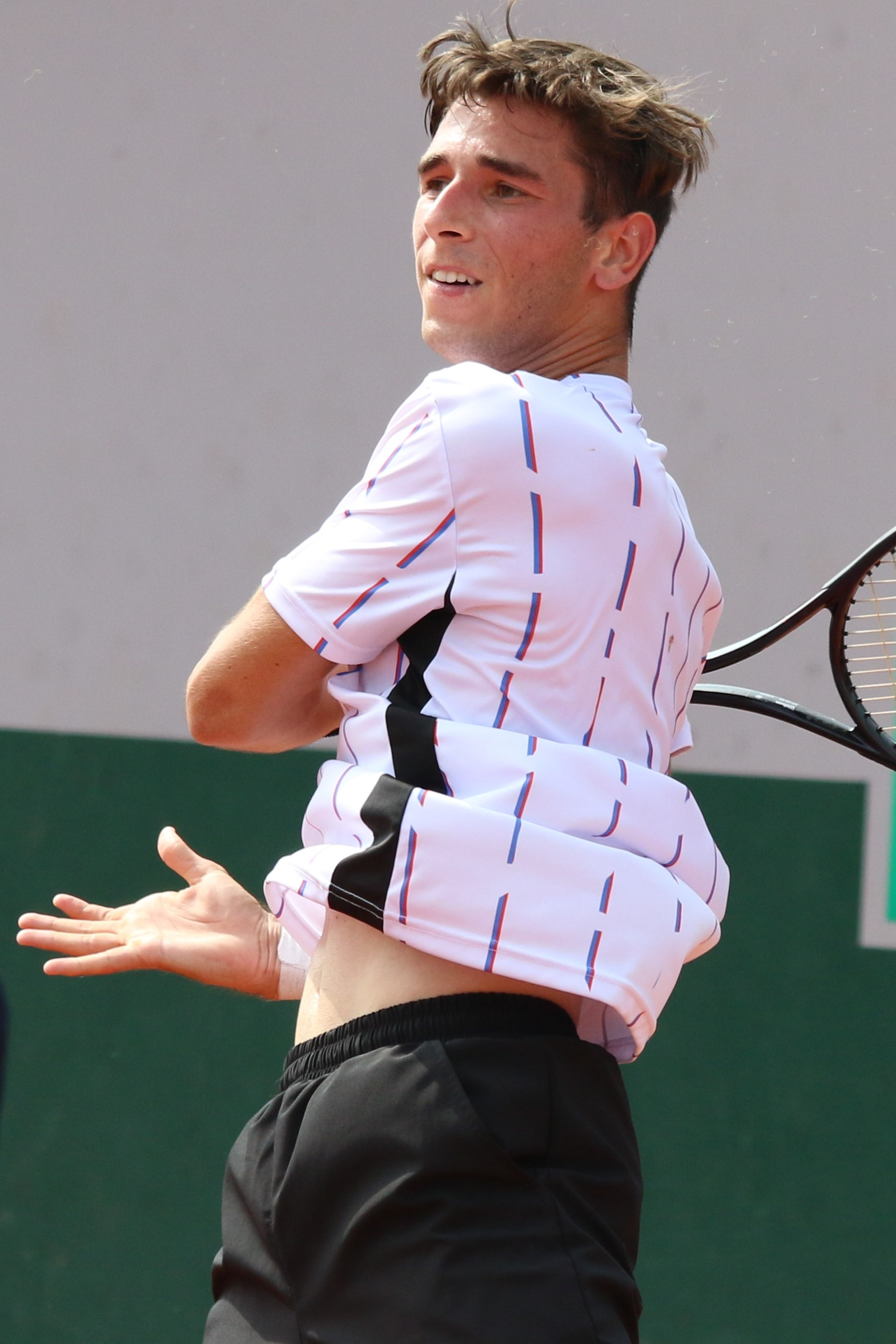
- Gigante at the 2023 French Open
- Country (sports): Italy
- Born: 4 January 2002 (age 24) Rome, Italy
- Height: 1.80 m (5 ft 11 in)
- Plays: Left-handed (two-handed backhand)
- Coach: Marco Gulisano
- Prize money: US $982,468

Singles
- Career record: 6–7
- Career titles: 0
- Highest ranking: No. 125 (28 July 2025)

Grand Slam singles results
- Australian Open: 1R (2025)
- French Open: 3R (2025)
- Wimbledon: Q3 (2023)
- US Open: Q2 (2025)

Doubles
- Career record: 0–0
- Career titles: 0
- Highest ranking: No. 334 (6 February 2023)

Matteo Gigante (Italian pronunciation: [matˈtɛːo dʒiˈɡante]; born 4 January 2002) is an Italian inactive tennis player. He has a career high ATP singles ranking of world No. 125, achieved on 28 July 2025 and a career high doubles ranking of No. 334 achieved on 6 February 2023.

== Professional career ==
=== 2019-2021: ITF & ATP Challenger debuts ===
In 2019, Gigante made his debut at the ITF tour. In 2020, he made his debut on Challenger level in Bergamo after receiving a wildcard.

=== 2022: First ITF title, rise in the rankings ===
In 2022, Gigante won his first ITF title in Sharm El Sheikh. Later during the year, he made two semifinals on the Challenger tour. He started the season ranked outside the top 800 and finished the year inside the top 250.

=== 2023: First & second Challenger titles, top 200 debut ===
In 2023, he won his first Challenger title in Tenerife as a lucky loser making him only the 16th player to accomplish this feat. In July, he made his top 200 debut following his second career Challenger final in Milan. In August, he won his second Challenger title in Cordenons.

=== 2024: Challenger titles, Top 150, ATP, Masters debuts and first win ===
He reached the top 150 at world No. 148 on 4 March 2024, following a Challenger title in Nonthaburi, Thailand and then another title and a final both in Tenerife, Spain.

Ranked No. 145, at the 2024 Grand Prix Hassan II Gigante entered the main draw making his ATP debut after qualifying but retired in the second set of the match against the defending champion and eventual runner-up Roberto Carballés Baena.

Gigante made his debut at his home Masters tournament in Rome after receiving a wildcard for the main draw and defeated fellow wildcard player and compatriot Giulio Zeppieri recording his first ATP and also first Masters win.

=== 2025: Major debut and third round, top 125 ===
Gigante made his Grand Slam tournament debut at the Australian Open after qualifying into the main draw. He lost to Ugo Humbert in the first round.

Ranked No. 217, Gigante qualified at the 2025 Indian Wells making his main draw debut at the tournament and defeated Sebastian Baez, recording only his second ATP tour-level and also second Masters 1000-level win, and first on hardcourts.

Seeded seventh at his home tournament in Rome, Gigante won his fifth Challenger title beating top seed Vilius Gaubas in three sets.

Gigante qualified for a second Grand Slam in a row at the French Open and claimed his first main draw major wins defeating first-time major qualifier Benjamin Hassan, and then 2021 Roland Garros finalist, 20th seed Stefanos Tsitsipas, his first top-20 win. Following the 2025 Wimbledon Championships, he reached the top 125 on 28 July 2025.

== Performance timeline ==
Key
W	F	SF	QF	#R	RR	Q#	P#	DNQ	A	Z#	PO	G	S	B	NMS	NTI	P	NH

(W) winner; (F) finalist; (SF) semifinalist; (QF) quarterfinalist; (#R) rounds 4, 3, 2, 1; (RR) round-robin stage; (Q#) qualification round; (P#) preliminary round; (DNQ) did not qualify; (A) absent; (Z#) Davis/Fed Cup Zonal Group (with number indication) or (PO) play-off; (G) gold, (S) silver or (B) bronze Olympic/Paralympic medal; (NMS) not a Masters tournament; (NTI) not a Tier I tournament; (P) postponed; (NH) not held; (SR) strike rate (events won / competed); (W–L) win–loss record.
To avoid confusion and double counting, these charts are updated at the conclusion of a tournament or when the player's participation has ended.

=== Singles ===
Tournament	2020	2021	2022	2023	2024	2025	SR	W–L	Win %
Grand Slams
Australian Open	A	A	A	A	Q1	1R	0 / 1	0–1	0%
French Open	A	A	A	Q2	Q3	3R	0 / 1	2–1	67%
Wimbledon	NH	A	A	Q3	Q2	Q1	0 / 0	0–0	–
US Open	A	A	A	Q1	Q1	Q2	0 / 0	0–0	–
Win–loss	0–0	0–0	0–0	0–0	0–0	2–2	0 / 2	2–2	50%
Masters 1000
Indian Wells	NH	A	A	A	A	2R	0 / 1	1–1	50%
Miami Open	NH	A	A	A	A	A	0 / 0	0–0	–
Monte Carlo Masters	NH	A	A	A	A	A	0 / 0	0–0	–
Madrid Open	NH	A	A	A	Q1	A	0 / 0	0–0	–
Rome Masters	Q1	A	A	Q1	2R	2R	0 / 2	2–2	50%
Canada Masters	NH	A	A	A	A	2R	0 / 1	1–1	50%
Cincinnati Open	A	A	A	A	A	Q1	0 / 0	0–0	–
Shanghai Masters	NH			A	A	A	0 / 0	0–0	–
Paris Masters	A	A	A	A	A		0 / 0	0–0	–
Win–loss	0–0	0–0	0–0	0–0	1–1	3–3	0 / 4	4–4	50%
Year-end ranking									
Career Win–loss	0–0	0–0	0–0	0–0	1–2	5–5	0 / 6	6–7	46%

== ATP Challenger and ITF Tour finals ==
=== Singles: 10 (6 titles, 4 runner-ups) ===
Legend ATP Challenger Tour (5–3) ITF WTT (1–1)	Finals by Surface Hard (4–3) Clay (2–1)

Result	W–L	Date	Tournament	Tier	Surface	Opponent	Score
Loss	0–1	Feb 2022	M15 Sharm El Sheikh, Egypt	WTT	Hard	(Romania) Nicholas David Ionel	3–6, 6–4, 1–6
Win	1–1	Mar 2022	M15 Sharm El Sheikh, Egypt	WTT	Hard	(Italy) Samuel Vincent Ruggeri	6–2, 6–2
Win	2–1	Feb 2023	Tenerife, Spain	Challenger	Hard	(Italy) Stefano Travaglia	6–3, 6–2
Loss	2–2	July 2023	Milan, Italy	Challenger	Clay	(Argentina) Facundo Diaz Acosta	6–3, 6–3
Win	3–2	Aug 2023	Cordenons, Italy	Challenger	Clay	(Austria) Lukas Neumayer	6–0, 6–2
Win	4–2	Jan 2024	Nonthaburi, Thailand	Challenger	Hard	(South Korea) Seong Chan Hong	6–4, 6–1
Win	5–2	Feb 2024	Tenerife, Spain	Challenger	Hard	(Italy) Stefano Travaglia	6–2, 6–4
Loss	5–3	Feb 2024	Tenerife, Spain	Challenger	Hard	(Kazakhstan) Mikhail Kukushkin	2–6, 0–2 ret.
Loss	5–4	Aug 2024	Manacor, Spain	Challenger	Hard	(Croatia) Duje Ajduković	6–4, 3–6, 4–6
Win	6–4	Apr 2025	Rome, Italy	Challenger	Clay	(Lithuania) Vilius Gaubas	6–2, 3–6, 6–4

=== Doubles: 5 (5 runner-ups) ===
Legend ATP Challenger Tour (0–3) ITF WTT (0–2)	Finals by Surface Hard (0–2) Clay (0–3)

Result	W–L	Date	Tournament	Tier	Surface	Partner	Opponents	Score
Loss	0–1	Feb 2022	M15 Sharm El Sheikh, Egypt	WTT	Hard	(Italy) Marco Miceli	(Italy) Mattia Bellucci (Italy) Federico Iannaccone	2–6, 2–6
Loss	0–2	Apr 2022	Sanremo, Italy	Challenger	Clay	(Italy) Flavio Cobolli	(France) Geoffrey Blancaneaux (France) Alexandre Müller	6–4, 3–6, [9–11]
Loss	0–3	Apr 2022	M25 Santa Margherita di Pula, Italy	WTT	Clay	(Italy) Francesco Maestrelli	(Italy) Omar Giacalone (Italy) Alexander Weis	1–6, 6–3, [6–10]
Loss	0–4	May 2022	Vicenza, Italy	Challenger	Clay	(Italy) Francesco Passaro	(Argentina) Francisco Comesaña (Italy) Luciano Darderi	3–6, 6–7^{(4–7)}
Loss	0–5	Feb 2023	Tenerife, Spain	Challenger	Hard	(Italy) Francesco Passaro	(United States) Christian Harrison (Japan) Shintaro Mochizuki	4–6, 3–6
