= Open Menorca =

- 2025 Open Menorca

ATP Challenger Tour
- Location: Menorca, Spain
- Venue: Club Tenis Ciutadella
- Category: ATP Challenger Tour 100
- Surface: Clay
- Prize money: €145,250
- Website: Website

The Open Menorca is a professional tennis tournament played on clay courts. It is currently part of the ATP Challenger Tour. It was first held in Menorca, Spain in 2025.

== Past finals ==
=== Singles ===
Year	Champion	Runner-up	Score
2026	(Italy) Raúl Brancaccio	(Spain) Àlex Martínez	6–1, 6–4
2025	(Lithuania) Vilius Gaubas	(Spain) Pol Martín Tiffon	6–0, 6–4

=== Doubles ===
Year	Champions	Runners-up	Score
2026	(Thailand) Pruchya Isaro (India) Niki Kaliyanda Poonacha	(India) Siddhant Banthia (Bulgaria) Alexander Donski	6–3, 7–6^{(7–3)}
2025	(Lebanon) Benjamin Hassan (Austria) Sebastian Ofner	(Italy) Andrea Vavassori (Italy) Matteo Vavassori	7–5, 6–3
