= Pol Martín Tiffon =

Spanish tennis player (born 1999)

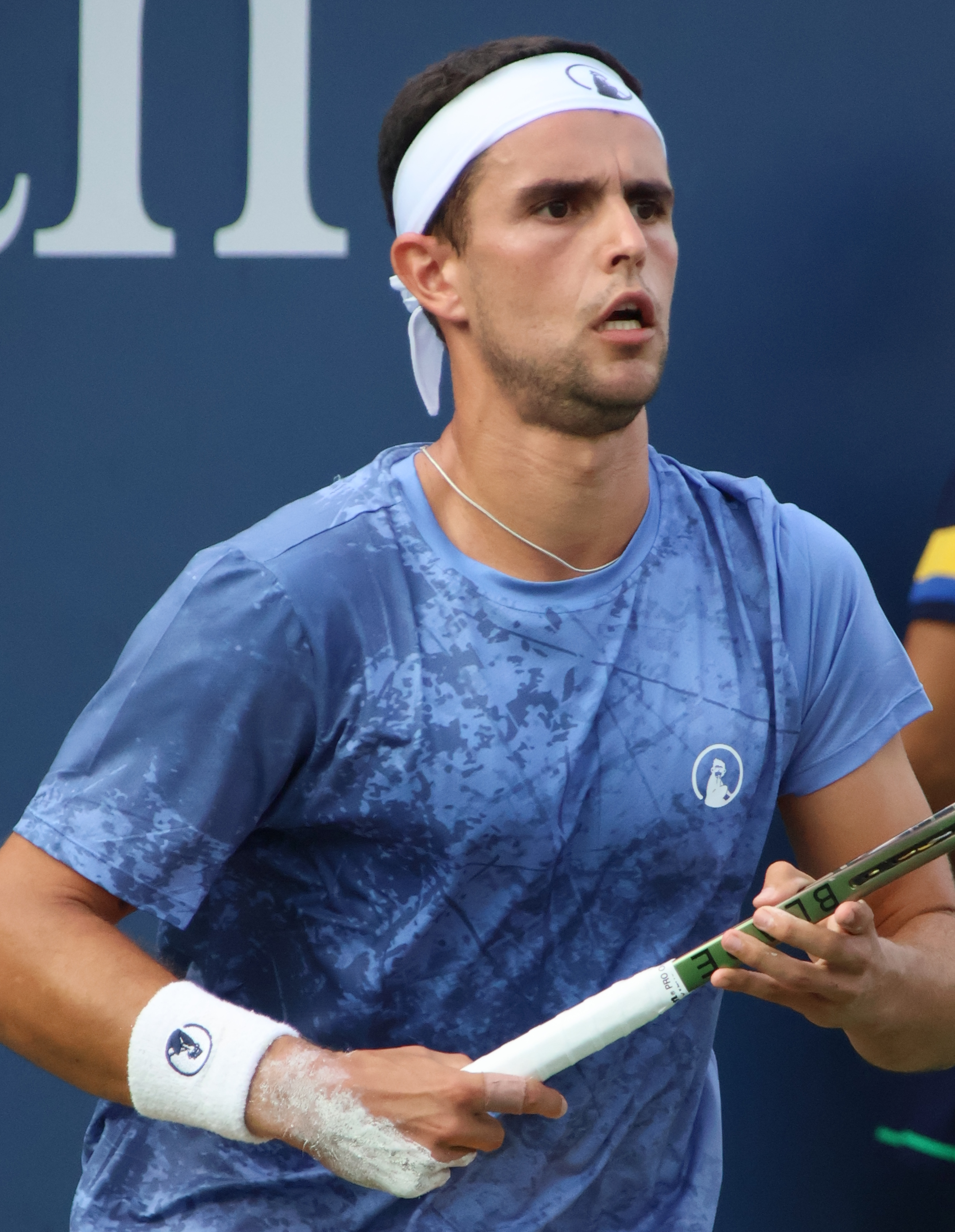
- Martín Tiffon at the 2026 US Open
- Country (sports): Spain
- Born: 30 July 1999 (age 27) Barcelona, Spain
- Height: 1.83 m (6 ft 0 in)
- Plays: Right-handed (two-handed backhand)
- Coach: Jose Maria Arenas
- Prize money: US $404,611

Singles
- Career record: 0–0 (at ATP Tour level, Grand Slam level, and in Davis Cup)
- Career titles: 1 Challenger, 12 ITF
- Highest ranking: No. 197 (9 June 2025)
- Current ranking: No. 210 (31 August 2026)

Grand Slam singles results
- French Open: Q2 (2025)
- Wimbledon: Q2 (2026)
- US Open: Q1 (2025, 2026)

Doubles
- Career record: 0–0 (at ATP Tour level, Grand Slam level, and in Davis Cup)
- Career titles: 1 ITF
- Highest ranking: No. 728 (25 July 2022)
- Last updated on: 1 September 2026.

Pol Martín Tiffon (born 30 July 1999) is a Spanish tennis player. He has a career high ATP singles ranking of No. 197 achieved on 9 June 2025 and a career high ATP doubles ranking of No. 728 achieved on 25 July 2022.

Martín Tiffon has won one ATP Challenger singles title at the 2026 Nonthaburi Challenger II.

== ATP Challenger Tour finals ==
=== Singles: 2 (1 title, 1 runner-up) ===
Legend ATP Challenger Tour (1–1)	Finals by surface Hard (1–0) Clay (0–1)

Result	W–L	Date	Tournament	Tier	Surface	Opponent	Score
Loss	0–1	Mar 2025	Menorca Open, Spain	Challenger	Clay	(Lithuania) Vilius Gaubas	0–6, 4–6
Win	1–1	Jan 2026	Nonthaburi Challenger II, Thailand	Challenger	Hard	(Thailand) Maximus Jones	6–4, 3–6, 6–4
