= 2025 Aspria Tennis Cup =

- Date: 23–28 June
- Edition: 19th
- Surface: Clay
- Location: Milan, Italy

Champions

Singles
- (Italy) Marco Cecchinato

Doubles
- (Australia) Matthew Romios / (United States) Ryan Seggerman
- Aspria Tennis Cup

The 2025 Aspria Tennis Cup Trofeo BCS was a professional tennis tournament played on clay courts. It was the 19th edition of the tournament which was part of the 2025 ATP Challenger Tour. It took place in Milan, Italy between 23 and 28 June 2025.

== Singles main-draw entrants ==
=== Seeds ===
Country	Player	Rank^{1}	Seed
CRO	Dino Prižmić	175	1
BEL	Kimmer Coppejans	237	2
NED	Max Houkes	256	3
CHI	Matías Soto	257	4
MEX	Rodrigo Pacheco Méndez	259	5
POR	Frederico Ferreira Silva	261	6
CRO	Mili Poljičak	265	7
	Ivan Gakhov	268	8

- ^{1} Rankings are as of 16 June 2025.

=== Other entrants ===
The following players received wildcards into the singles main draw:

- (Italy) Marco Cecchinato
- (Italy) Gabriele Piraino
- (Italy) Jacopo Vasamì

The following player received entry into the singles main draw using a protected ranking:

- (Italy) ~~Francesco Forti~~

The following player received entry into the singles main draw through the Junior Accelerator programme:

- (Spain) Rafael Jódar

The following player received entry into the singles main draw through the Next Gen Accelerator programme:

- (Germany) Diego Dedura

The following players received entry into the singles main draw as alternates:

- (Ukraine) Oleg Prihodko
- (Spain) Oriol Roca Batalla

The following players received entry from the qualifying draw:

- (Spain) Max Alcalá Gurri
- (Italy) Jacopo Berrettini
- (Italy) Federico Bondioli
- (France) Thomas Faurel
- (Italy) Giovanni Fonio
- (Spain) Andrés Santamarta Roig

The following player received entry as a lucky loser:

- (Portugal) Tiago Pereira

== Champions ==
=== Singles ===
- (Italy) Marco Cecchinato def. (Croatia) Dino Prižmić 6–2, 6–3.

=== Doubles ===
- (Australia) Matthew Romios / (United States) Ryan Seggerman def. (United States) George Goldhoff / (Chinese Taipei) Ray Ho 3–6, 7–5, [10–8].
