= Vilius Gaubas =

Lithuanian tennis player (born 2004)

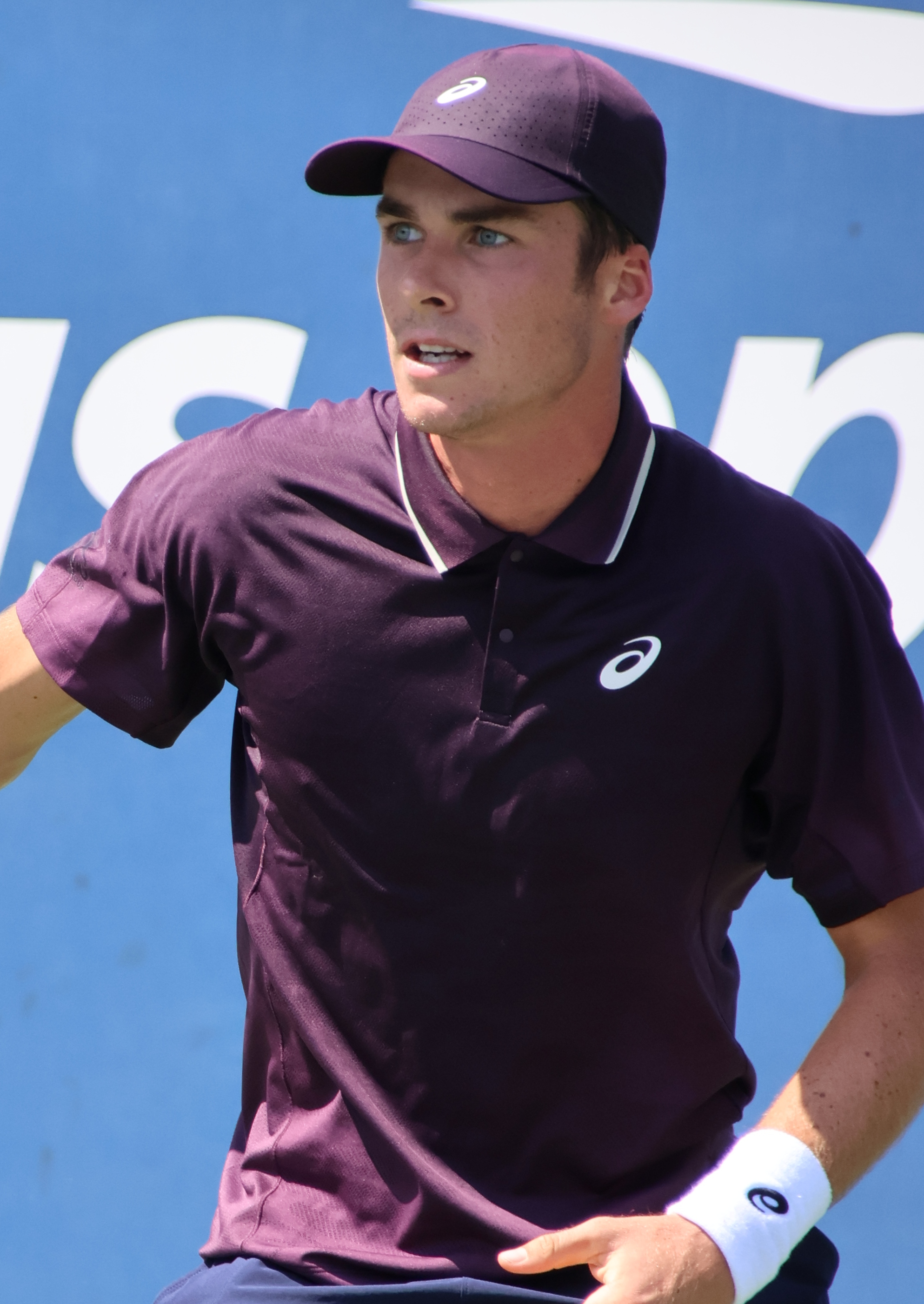
- Gaubas at the 2026 US Open
- Country (sports): Lithuania
- Born: 29 December 2004 (age 21) Šiauliai, Lithuania
- Height: 1.78 m (5 ft 10 in)
- Plays: Right-handed (two-handed backhand)
- Coach: Guillermo García López
- Prize money: US $897,535

Singles
- Career record: 11–16 (at ATP Tour level, Grand Slam level, and in Davis Cup)
- Career titles: 0
- Highest ranking: No. 101 (2 March 2026)
- Current ranking: No. 141 (28 September 2026)

Grand Slam singles results
- Australian Open: Q2 (2026)
- French Open: 1R (2026)
- Wimbledon: 1R (2026)
- US Open: Q3 (2024, 2026)

Doubles
- Career record: 2–3 (at ATP Tour level, Grand Slam level, and in Davis Cup)
- Career titles: 0
- Highest ranking: No. 1,000 (30 March 2026)
- Current ranking: No. 1,012 (22 June 2026)

Grand Slam doubles results
- US Open Junior: 2R (2021)

Team competitions
- Davis Cup: 7–10
- Last updated on: 30 September 2026.

Vilius Gaubas (born 29 December 2004) is a Lithuanian professional tennis player. He has a career-high ATP singles ranking of No. 101 achieved on 2 March 2026 and a career-high doubles ranking of No. 1,000 achieved on 30 March 2026. He is currently the No. 1 men's singles player from Lithuania.

Gaubas represents Lithuania at the Davis Cup, where he has a W–L record of 7–10 record in singles and in doubles.

== Career ==
=== 2024: Maiden Challenger title, top 200 debut ===
In 2024, following two ATP Challenger finals and his maiden Challenger title in Cordenons, Italy, where he was the youngest of three Lithuanian champions in Challenger history (since 1978), he reached a new career-high ranking of No. 186 on 12 August 2024.

=== 2025-2026: ATP, Major, Masters debuts & historic third round ===
Following his second Challenger title at the newly established 2025 Open Menorca, he reached the top 150 at world No. 149 on 7 April 2025.

Ranked No. 154, Gaubas made his ATP and Masters 1000 main draw debut in Rome at the 2025 Italian Open after qualifying for the main draw and defeated Damir Džumhur, recording his first Masters and also top 100 win. Next he upset 27th seed Denis Shapovalov in straight sets, his first top 50 and top 30 win, to reach the third round of an ATP tournament for the first time in his career. He became the first Lithuanian male player to reach that stage at a Masters 1000.

Gaubas reached the top 105 at world No. 101 on 2 March 2026. Two months later, he made his Grand Slam debut as a lucky loser at the 2026 French Open, following the withdrawal of Patrick Kypson but lost to Luca Van Assche.

== ATP Challenger Tour finals ==
=== Singles: 7 (3 titles, 4 runner-ups) ===
Legend ATP Challenger Tour (3–4)	Finals by surface Hard (–) Clay (3–4)

Result	W–L	Date	Tournament	Tier	Surface	Opponent	Score
Loss	0–1	Apr 2024	Garden Open, Italy	Challenger	Clay	(Spain) Alejandro Moro Cañas	5–7, 3–6
Loss	0–2	Jul 2024	Internazionali Città di Verona, Italy	Challenger	Clay	(Italy) Federico Arnaboldi	2–6, 2–6
Win	1–2	Aug 2024	Serena Wines 1881, Cordenons, Italy	Challenger	Clay	(Spain) Carlos Taberner	2–6, 6–2, 6–4
Win	2–2	Mar 2025	Menorca Open, Spain	Challenger	Clay	(Spain) Pol Martín Tiffon	6–0, 6–4
Loss	2–3	Apr 2025	Garden Open, Italy	Challenger	Clay	(Italy) Matteo Gigante	2–6, 6–3, 4–6
Win	3–3	Sep 2025	Lisboa Belém Open, Portugal	Challenger	Clay	(Portugal) Henrique Rocha	6–7^{(3–7)}, 6–3, 6–4
Loss	3–4	Sep 2025	Braga Open, Portugal	Challenger	Clay	(Croatia) Luka Mikrut	3–6, 4–6

== ITF World Tennis Tour finals ==
=== Singles: 8 (4 titles, 4 runner-ups) ===
Legend ITF WTT (4–4)	Finals by surface Hard (0–1) Clay (4–3)

Result	W–L	Date	Tournament	Tier	Surface	Opponent	Score
Win	1–0	Jul 2022	M15 Velenje, Slovenia	WTT	Clay	(Croatia) Duje Kekez	6–3, 6–4
Win	2–0	Apr 2023	M25 Reus, Spain	WTT	Clay	(Spain) Miguel Damas	6–4, 6–4
Win	3–0	Apr 2023	M15 Telde, Spain	WTT	Clay	(Spain) Diego Augusto Barreto Sánchez	7–6^{(7–4)}, 6–2
Loss	3–1	Aug 2023	M15 Xàtiva, Spain	WTT	Clay	(Spain) Carlos López Montagud	4–6, 6–7^{(7–9)}
Loss	3–2	Aug 2023	M25 Santander, Spain	WTT	Clay	Svyatoslav Gulin	7–6^{(7–5)}, 4–6, 4–6
Win	4–2	Sep 2023	M25 Sabadell, Spain	WTT	Clay	(United Kingdom) Felix Gill	6–4, 6–4
Loss	4–3	Feb 2024	M25 Antalya, Turkey	WTT	Clay	(Spain) Carlos Gimeno Valero	6–1, 6–7^{(1–7)}, 5–7
Loss	4–4	Mar 2024	M25 Faro, Portugal	WTT	Hard	(Portugal) Jaime Faria	1–6, 3–6

=== Doubles: 1 (title) ===
Legend ITF WTT (1–0)

Result	W–L	Date	Tournament	Tier	Surface	Partner	Opponents	Score
Win	1–0	Nov 2023	M25 Benicarló, Spain	WTT	Clay	(France) Kenny de Schepper	(Bulgaria) Anthony Genov (Spain) Iker Urribarrens Ramírez	7–6 ^{(7–2)}, 3–6, [10–8]
