= Giorgio Ricca =

Italian tennis player

- Country (sports): Italy
- Born: 27 February 1995 (age 31) Monselice, Italy
- Height: 1.91 m (6 ft 3 in)
- Plays: Right-handed (one-handed backhand)
- Prize money: US $104,343

Singles
- Career record: 0–0 (at ATP Tour level, Grand Slam level, and in Davis Cup)
- Career titles: 0; 0 Challenger, 0 Futures
- Highest ranking: No. 633 (25 November 2019)

Doubles
- Career record: 0–1 (at ATP Tour level, Grand Slam level, and in Davis Cup)
- Career titles: 0; 0 Challenger, 16 Futures
- Highest ranking: No. 160 (28 July 2025)
- Current ranking: No. 221 (22 June 2026)
- Last updated on: 22 June 2026.

Giorgio Ricca (born 27 February 1995) is an Italian tennis player. Ricca has a career high ATP singles ranking of No. 633 achieved on 25 November 2019 and a career high ATP doubles ranking of No. 160 achieved on 28 July 2025.

Ricca made his ATP main draw debut at the 2024 Italian Open, receiving a wildcard into the doubles main draw with Jacopo Bilardo after winning a wildcard tournament.

== ATP Challenger and ITF Tour finals ==
=== Singles: 1 (0–1) ===
Legend (singles) ATP Challenger Tour (0–0) Futures/ITF World Tennis Tour (0–1)	Finals by surface Hard (0–1) Clay (0–0) Grass (0–0)

Result	W–L	Date	Tournament	Tier	Surface	Opponent	Score
Loss	0–1	Sep 2019	M15 Sajur, Israel	World Tennis Tour	Hard	(Israel) Yshai Oliel	1–6, 6–7^{(6–8)}

=== Doubles: 27 (16–11) ===
Legend (doubles) ATP Challenger Tour (0–3) Futures/ITF World Tennis Tour (16–8)	Finals by surface Hard (3–5) Clay (13–6) Grass (0–0)

Result	W–L	Date	Tournament	Tier	Surface	Partner	Opponents	Score
Win	1–0	Dec 2018	Tunisia F42, Monastir	ITF Tour	Hard	(Italy) Erik Crepaldi	(Argentina) Franco Emanuel Egea (Germany) Jakob Sude	2–6, 6–3, [10–5]
Loss	1–1	Sep 2019	M15 Sajur, Israel	World Tennis Tour	Hard	(Switzerland) Riccardo Maiga	(Russia) Timur Kiyamov (Russia) Yan Sabanin	6–7^{(1–7)}, 7–6^{(7–4)}, [3–10]
Loss	1–2	Oct 2019	M15 Sharm El Sheikh, Egypt	World Tennis Tour	Hard	(Morocco) Adam Moundir	(Czech Republic) Marek Gengel (Tunisia) Anis Ghorbel	6–7^{(4–7)}, 3–6
Win	2–2	Jun 2021	M15 Genova, Italy	World Tennis Tour	Clay	(Switzerland) Remy Bertola	(Argentina) Juan Ignacio Galarza (Argentina) Juan Pablo Paz	6–3, 7–5
Loss	2–3	Sep 2021	M15 Monastir, Tunisia	World Tennis Tour	Hard	(Australia) Ajeet Rai	(Burundi) Guy Orly Iradukunda (Russia) Marat Sharipov	3–6, 6–4, [6–10]
Win	3–3	Apr 2022	M25 Santa Margherita di Pula, Italy	World Tennis Tour	Clay	(Italy) Edoardo Lavagno	(Italy) Federico Arnaboldi (Italy) Gianmarco Ferrari	7–6^{(7–3)}, 6–4
Win	4–3	Sep 2022	M15 Pescara, Italy	World Tennis Tour	Clay	(Italy) Marcello Serafini	(Argentina) Juan Bautista Otegui (Greece) Stefanos Sakellaridis	6–3, 6–1
Win	5–3	Jun 2023	M15 Chieti, Italy	World Tennis Tour	Clay	(Italy) Andrea Picchione	(Italy) Alexandr Binda (Italy) Matteo De Vincentis	3–6, 7–5, [10–7]
Loss	5–4	Jun 2023	M25 Cattolica, Italy	World Tennis Tour	Clay	(Italy) Augusto Virgili	(Italy) Gabriele Piraino (Italy) Filippo Romano	4–6, 4–6
Win	6–4	Jul 2023	M15 Gubbio, Italy	World Tennis Tour	Clay	(Italy) Jacopo Bilardo	(Italy) Gabriele Maria Noce (Italy) Luigi Sorrentino	7–6^{(8–6)}, 6–1
Win	7–4	Jul 2023	M15 Perugia, Italy	World Tennis Tour	Clay	(Italy) Andrea Picchione	(Italy) Federico Bertuccioli (Italy) Luca Tomasetto	6–2, 5–7, [10–3]
Win	8–4	Aug 2023	M15 Pescara, Italy	World Tennis Tour	Clay	(Italy) Andrea Picchione	(Italy) Carlo Alberto Caniato (Italy) Gabriele Vulpitta	6–7^{(3–7)}, 6–3, [10–8]
Win	9–4	Sep 2023	M25 Pozzuoli, Italy	World Tennis Tour	Hard	(Italy) Francesco Forti	(Italy) Fabio De Michele (Italy) Gabriele Vulpitta	6–2, 6–3
Win	10–4	Oct 2023	M25 Santa Margherita di Pula, Italy	World Tennis Tour	Clay	(Italy) Luca Potenza	(Japan) Ryuki Matsuda (Italy) Augusto Virgili	6–2, 6–1
Win	11–4	Dec 2023	M25 Monastir, Tunisia	World Tennis Tour	Hard	(Switzerland) Remy Bertola	(Croatia) Matej Dodig (Germany) Sebastian Prechtel	6–3, 6–0
Loss	11–5	Feb 2024	M25 Trento, Italy	World Tennis Tour	Hard	(Italy) Augusto Virgili	(Germany) Daniel Masur (Austria) Neil Oberleitner	2–6, 4–6
Loss	11–6	Mar 2024	M25 Santa Margherita di Pula, Italy	World Tennis Tour	Clay	(Italy) Marcello Serafini	(Italy) Giuseppe Tresca (Italy) Augusto Virgili	6–7^{(3–7)}, 1–6
Win	12–6	Apr 2024	M25 Santa Margherita di Pula, Italy	World Tennis Tour	Clay	(Italy) Luca Potenza]	(Italy) Giovanni Oradini (Italy) Marcello Serafini	6–4, 6–3
Win	13–6	May 2024	M25 Mataro, Spain	World Tennis Tour	Clay	(Italy) Augusto Virgili	(Bulgaria) Anthony Genov (Spain) Bruno Pujol Navarro	6–3, 6–4
Loss	13–7	Jun 2024	M15 Chieti, Italy	World Tennis Tour	Clay	(Italy) Augusto Virgili	(Italy) Lorenzo Rottoli (Italy) Luigi Sorrentino	3–6, 6–7^{(3–7)}
Win	14–7	Aug 2024	M25 Lesa, Italy	World Tennis Tour	Clay	(Italy) Alexander Weis	(India) Siddhant Banthia (United States) Tennyson Whiting	6–2, 6–1
Loss	14–8	Oct 2024	M25 Santa Margherita di Pula, Italy	World Tennis Tour	Clay	(Italy) Augusto Virgili	(Italy) Simone Agostini (Italy) Gianluca Cadenasso	6–3, 3–6, [3–10]
Loss	14–9	Mar 2025	Cherbourg, France	Challenger	Hard	(Slovakia) Lukas Pokorny	(Ukraine) Oleg Prihodko (Ukraine) Vitaliy Sachko	2–6, 2–6
Loss	14–10	Apr 2025	Rome, Italy	Challenger	Clay	(Italy) Marco Bortolotti	(Sweden) Erik Grevelius (Sweden) Adam Heinonen	6–7^{(2–7)}, 5–7
Win	15–10	Oct 2025	M25 Santa Margherita di Pula, Italy	World Tennis Tour	Clay	(Italy) Luca Potenza	(Italy) Federico Iannaccone (Italy) Giorgio Tabacco	walkover
Win	16–10	Jun 2026	M25 Milan, Italy	World Tennis Tour	Clay	(Italy) Jacopo Bilardo	(Italy) Riccardo Perin (Italy) Luca Potenza	7–6^{(7–5)}, 7–6^{(7–4)}
Loss	16–11	Oct 2026	Florence, Italy	Challenger	Clay	(Italy) Jacopo Bilardo	(Netherlands) Mats Hermans (Netherlands) Max Houkes	5–7, 6–4, [8–10]
