= 2019 Lisboa Belém Open – Singles =

Singles
- 2019 Lisboa Belém Open

Final
- Champion: (Spain) Roberto Carballés Baena
- Runner-up: (Argentina) Facundo Bagnis
- Score: 2–6, 7–6^{(7–5)}, 6–1

Events
| Singles | Doubles |
| ← 2018 · | Lisboa Belém Open | · 2020 → |

Tommy Robredo was the defending champion but retired in the first round against Maxime Janvier.

Roberto Carballés Baena won the title after defeating Facundo Bagnis 2–6, 7–6^{(7–5)}, 6–1 in the final.

== Seeds ==
All seeds receive a bye into the second round.

1. (France) Adrian Mannarino (second round)
2. (Spain) Roberto Carballés Baena (champion)
3. (Argentina) Guido Andreozzi (quarterfinals)
4. (Portugal) Pedro Sousa (withdrew)
5. (Australia) Alexei Popyrin (third round)
6. (United States) Bjorn Fratangelo (third round)
7. (Spain) Pedro Martínez (semifinals)
8. (Australia) James Duckworth (second round)
9. (United States) Marcos Giron (second round)
10. (Argentina) Facundo Bagnis (final)
11. (Italy) Lorenzo Giustino (semifinals, retired)
12. (Italy) Alessandro Giannessi (second round, retired)
13. (United States) Mitchell Krueger (second round)
14. (Spain) Enrique López Pérez (third round, retired)
15. (Portugal) João Domingues (second round)
16. (Australia) Marc Polmans (second round)

== Draw ==
=== Key ===
- Q = Qualifier
- WC = Wild card
- LL = Lucky loser
- Alt = Alternate
- SE = Special exempt
- PR = Protected ranking
- ITF = ITF entry
- JE = Junior exempt
- w/o = Walkover
- r = Retired
- d = Defaulted
- SR = Special ranking

=== Finals ===
Quarterfinals
ITF | (Switzerland) Sandro Ehrat | 5 | 6 | 2
11 | (Italy) Lorenzo Giustino | 7 | 3 | 6
(Spain) Mario Vilella Martínez | 2 | 3
10 | (Argentina) Facundo Bagnis | 6 | 6
7 | (Spain) Pedro Martínez | 4 | 6 | 6
3 | (Argentina) Guido Andreozzi | 6 | 2 | 3
(France) Elliot Benchetrit | 3 | 0
2/WC | (Spain) Roberto Carballés Baena | 6 | 6

Semifinals
11 | (Italy) Lorenzo Giustino | 4 | 3^{r}
10 | (Argentina) Facundo Bagnis | 6 | 4
7 | (Spain) Pedro Martínez | 3 | 1
2/WC | (Spain) Roberto Carballés Baena | 6 | 6

Final
10 | (Argentina) Facundo Bagnis | 6 | 6^{5} | 1
2/WC | (Spain) Roberto Carballés Baena | 2 | 7^{7} | 6

=== Top half ===
==== Section 1 ====
First round
(Belgium) S Darcis | 6 | 7
Q | (Spain) N Kuhn | 1 | 5
ITF | (Switzerland) S Ehrat | 7^{8} | 6
(United States) JC Aragone | 6^{6} | 2
(Czech Republic) Z Kolář | 6 | 4 | 6
(Argentina) P Cachin | 3 | 6 | 3
(Spain) T Robredo | 1^{r}
(France) M Janvier | 5

Second round
1/WC | (France) A Mannarino | 7 | 0 | 1
(Belgium) S Darcis | 5 | 6 | 6
ITF | (Switzerland) S Ehrat | 6 | 7^{7}
13 | (United States) M Krueger | 4 | 6^{2}
11 | (Italy) L Giustino | 6 | 6
(Czech Republic) Z Kolář | 4 | 2
(France) M Janvier | 7^{7} | 4 | 4
6 | (United States) B Fratangelo | 6^{5} | 6 | 6

Third round
(Belgium) S Darcis | 2 | 4
ITF | (Switzerland) S Ehrat | 6 | 6
11 | (Italy) L Giustino | 6 | 2 | 6
6 | (United States) B Fratangelo | 4 | 6 | 2

Quarterfinals
ITF | (Switzerland) S Ehrat | 5 | 6 | 2
11 | (Italy) L Giustino | 7 | 3 | 6

==== Section 2 ====
First round
(Italy) R Marcora | 4 | 7 | 6
(France) J Tatlot | 6 | 5 | 3
(Spain) M Vilella Martínez | 6 | 0
(Italy) GM Moroni | 2 | 0^{r}
(Egypt) M Safwat | 7 | 6
ITF | (France) G Jacq | 5 | 3
(France) K de Schepper | 5 | 1
(Ecuador) R Quiroz | 7 | 6

Second round
LL | (Portugal) Luís Faria | 1 | 2
(Italy) R Marcora | 6 | 6
(Spain) M Vilella Martínez | 6 | 6
15 | (Portugal) J Domingues | 3 | 4
10 | (Argentina) F Bagnis | 6 | 6
(Egypt) M Safwat | 2 | 2
(Ecuador) R Quiroz | 7^{8} | 7
8 | (Australia) J Duckworth | 6^{6} | 5

Third round
(Italy) R Marcora | 2 | 4
(Spain) M Vilella Martínez | 6 | 6
10 | (Argentina) F Bagnis | 6 | 6
(Ecuador) R Quiroz | 3 | 2

Quarterfinals
(Spain) M Vilella Martínez | 2 | 3
10 | (Argentina) F Bagnis | 6 | 6

=== Bottom half ===
==== Section 3 ====
First round
WC | (Portugal) F Ferreira Silva | 7^{7} | 6
Q | (Canada) S Diez | 6^{3} | 3
ITF | (Italy) R Brancaccio | 3 | 6 | 3
(Italy) A Arnaboldi | 6 | 1 | 6
WC | (Portugal) T Cação | 2 | 6 | 6
(Argentina) F Argüello | 6 | 2 | 1
(Italy) F Gaio | 4 | 6^{3}
WC | (Portugal) G Elias | 6 | 7^{7}

Second round
7 | (Spain) P Martínez | 6 | 6
WC | (Portugal) F Ferreira Silva | 3 | 4
(Italy) A Arnaboldi | 6 | 1
12 | (Italy) A Giannessi | 4 | 0^{r}
14 | (Spain) E López Pérez | 7^{7} | 6
WC | (Portugal) T Cação | 6^{5} | 4
WC | (Portugal) G Elias | 1 | 6 | 1^{r}
3 | (Argentina) G Andreozzi | 6 | 4 | 0

Third round
7 | (Spain) P Martínez | 4
(Italy) A Arnaboldi | 1^{r}
14 | (Spain) E López Pérez | 1^{r}
3 | (Argentina) G Andreozzi | 4

Quarterfinals
7 | (Spain) P Martínez | 4 | 6 | 6
3 | (Argentina) G Andreozzi | 6 | 2 | 3

==== Section 4 ====
First round
(Slovakia) N Gombos | 6 | 7
ITF | (Spain) J Barranco Cosano | 2 | 5
(Spain) D Gimeno Traver | 6 | 4 | 4
(France) E Benchetrit | 4 | 6 | 6
(Denmark) M Torpegaard | 3 | 2
(Spain) B Zapata Miralles | 6 | 6
ITF | (Italy) R Bonadio | 0 | 3
(Russia) E Karlovskiy | 6 | 6

Second round
5 | (Australia) A Popyrin | 6^{4} | 6 | 6
(Slovakia) N Gombos | 7^{7} | 4 | 2
(France) E Benchetrit | 7^{7} | 6
9 | (United States) M Giron | 6^{5} | 3
16 | (Australia) M Polmans | 3 | 7 | 4
(Spain) B Zapata Miralles | 6 | 5 | 6
(Russia) E Karlovskiy | 6 | 5 | 4
2/WC | (Spain) R Carballés Baena | 3 | 7 | 6

Third round
5 | (Australia) A Popyrin | 4 | 2
(France) E Benchetrit | 6 | 6
(Spain) B Zapata Miralles | 4 | 2
2/WC | (Spain) R Carballés Baena | 6 | 6

Quarterfinals
(France) E Benchetrit | 3 | 0
2/WC | (Spain) R Carballés Baena | 6 | 6
