= 2024 Lisboa Belém Open – Men's doubles =

Men's doubles
- 2024 Lisboa Belém Open

Final
- Champions: (Monaco) Romain Arneodo (France) Théo Arribagé
- Runners-up: (United States) George Goldhoff (Brazil) Fernando Romboli
- Score: 6–2, 6–3

Events
Singles	men	women
Doubles	men	women
← 2023 ·	Lisboa Belém Open	· 2025 →

Karol Drzewiecki and Zdeněk Kolář were the defending champions but only Drzewiecki chose to defend his title, partnering Piotr Matuszewski. They lost in the semifinals to Romain Arneodo and Théo Arribagé.

Arneodo and Arribagé won the title after defeating George Goldhoff and Fernando Romboli 6–2, 6–3 in the final.

== Seeds ==
1. (Monaco) Romain Arneodo / (France) Théo Arribagé (champions)
2. (Romania) Victor Vlad Cornea / (Ukraine) Denys Molchanov (first round)
3. (Italy) Marco Bortolotti / (United States) Ryan Seggerman (first round)
4. (Czech Republic) Petr Nouza / (Czech Republic) Patrik Rikl (quarterfinals)

== Draw ==
=== Key ===
- Q = Qualifier
- WC = Wild card
- LL = Lucky loser
- Alt = Alternate
- SE = Special exempt
- PR = Protected ranking
- ITF = ITF entry
- JE = Junior exempt
- w/o = Walkover
- r = Retired
- d = Defaulted
- SR = Special ranking

=== Draw ===
First round
1	(Monaco) R Arneodo (France) T Arribagé	6	7^{7}
WC	(Portugal) G Elias (Portugal) Gonçalo Falcão	1	6^{2}
(Venezuela) LD Martínez (Spain) D Vega Hernández	6	7^{7}
(Portugal) J Faria (Portugal) H Rocha	2	6^{5}
4	(Czech Republic) P Nouza (Czech Republic) P Rikl	6	6
(Israel) D Cukierman (Serbia) I Sabanov	2	3
(Poland) K Drzewiecki (Poland) P Matuszewski	5	7^{7}	[10]
(Bulgaria) A Donski (Austria) N Oberleitner	7	6^{4}	[7]
(Romania) A Jecan; I Liutarevich	7^{7}	7^{7}
WC	(Portugal) F Ferreira Silva (Portugal) D Vale	6^{4}	6^{5}
(Spain) Í Cervantes (Spain) D Rincón	7^{8}	6
3	(Italy) M Bortolotti (United States) R Seggerman	6^{6}	4
(Spain) S Martos Gornés (Poland) S Walków	6^{4}	3
(United States) G Goldhoff (Brazil) F Romboli	7^{7}	6
(Portugal) F Cabral (Italy) A Pellegrino	7	6
2	(Romania) V Cornea (Ukraine) D Molchanov	5	3

Quarterfinals
1	(Monaco) R Arneodo (France) T Arribagé	6	6
(Venezuela) LD Martínez (Spain) D Vega Hernández	4	3
4	(Czech Republic) P Nouza (Czech Republic) P Rikl	6^{4}	7^{10}	[5]
(Poland) K Drzewiecki (Poland) P Matuszewski	7^{7}	6^{8}	[10]
(Romania) A Jecan; I Liutarevich	3	4
(Spain) Í Cervantes (Spain) D Rincón	6	6
(United States) G Goldhoff (Brazil) F Romboli	6	6
(Portugal) F Cabral (Italy) A Pellegrino	4	4

Semifinals
1	(Monaco) R Arneodo (France) T Arribagé	4	7	[10]
(Poland) K Drzewiecki (Poland) P Matuszewski	6	5	[7]
(Spain) Í Cervantes (Spain) D Rincón
(United States) G Goldhoff (Brazil) F Romboli	w/o

Final
1	(Monaco) R Arneodo (France) T Arribagé	6	6
(United States) G Goldhoff (Brazil) F Romboli	2	3
