= 2026 Lisboa Belém Open – Men's doubles =

Men's doubles
- 2026 Lisboa Belém Open

Final
- Champions: (Portugal) Tiago Pereira (Spain) Benjamín Winter López
- Runners-up: (Poland) Karol Drzewiecki (Poland) Piotr Matuszewski
- Score: 4–6, 6–3, [10–5]

Events
Singles	men	women
Doubles	men	women
- Lisboa Belém Open

Pablo Llamas Ruiz and Sergio Martos Gornés were the defending champions but only Martos Gornés chose to defend his title, partnering Szymon Walków. They lost in the first round to Vasco Leote Prata and Diogo Morais.

Tiago Pereira and Benjamín Winter López won the title after defeating Karol Drzewiecki and Piotr Matuszewski 4–6, 6–3, [10–5] in the final.

== Seeds ==
1. (Spain) Íñigo Cervantes / (Ukraine) Denys Molchanov (first round)
2. (Portugal) Tiago Pereira / (Spain) Benjamín Winter López (champions)
3. (Croatia) Admir Kalender / (Slovakia) Miloš Karol (first round)
4. (Poland) Karol Drzewiecki / (Poland) Piotr Matuszewski (final)

== Draw ==
Key

- Q = Qualifier
- WC = Wild card
- LL = Lucky loser
- Alt = Alternate
- ITF = ITF entry
- PR = Protected ranking
- SR = Special ranking
- SE = Special exempt
- JE = Junior exempt
- JR = Junior Accelerator Programme entrant
- CO = College Accelerator Programme entrant
- NG = Next Gen Accelerator Program entrant
- w/o = Walkover
- r = Retired
- d = Defaulted

First round
1	(Spain) Í Cervantes (Ukraine) D Molchanov	2	7^{7}	[5]
(Romania) V Cornea (Germany) K Wehnelt	6	6^{3}	[10]
WC	(Portugal) Vasco Leote Prata (Portugal) Diogo Morais	6	6^{5}	[10]
(Spain) S Martos Gornés (Poland) S Walków	4	7^{7}	[6]
4	(Poland) K Drzewiecki (Poland) P Matuszewski	6	7
WC	(Portugal) J Domingues (Portugal) T Torres	3	5
(Morocco) Y Lalami (Spain) M Mansilla Díez	4	6	[6]
(Spain) M Alcalá Gurri (Spain) N Sánchez Izquierdo	6	3	[10]
(Italy) R Brancaccio (Italy) M Cecchinato	1	4
(Spain) D Vega Hernández (Japan) T Yuzuki	6	6
(Romania) A Jecan (Poland) S Kielan	6	6
3	(Croatia) A Kalender (Slovakia) M Karol	2	4
(Ecuador) A Andrade (Jordan) A Shelbayh
(Tunisia) S Mansouri (Austria) M Neuchrist	w/o
(Portugal) T Cação (Portugal) Francisco Rocha	5	3
2	(Portugal) T Pereira (Spain) B Winter López	7	6

Quarterfinals
(Romania) V Cornea (Germany) K Wehnelt	4	6	[10]
WC	(Portugal) V Leote Prata (Portugal) D Morais	6	1	[8]
4	(Poland) K Drzewiecki (Poland) P Matuszewski	1	6	[13]
(Spain) M Alcalá Gurri (Spain) N Sánchez Izquierdo	6	3	[11]
(Spain) D Vega Hernández (Japan) T Yuzuki	3	7^{7}	[7]
(Romania) A Jecan (Poland) S Kielan	6	6^{2}	[10]
(Tunisia) S Mansouri (Austria) M Neuchrist	6^{1}	2
2	(Portugal) T Pereira (Spain) B Winter López	7^{7}	6

Semifinals
(Romania) V Cornea (Germany) K Wehnelt	6^{3}	0
4	(Poland) K Drzewiecki (Poland) P Matuszewski	7^{7}	6
(Romania) A Jecan (Poland) S Kielan	7	3	[8]
2	(Portugal) T Pereira (Spain) B Winter López	5	6	[10]

Final
4	(Poland) K Drzewiecki (Poland) P Matuszewski	6	3	[5]
2	(Portugal) T Pereira (Spain) B Winter López	4	6	[10]
