= 2021 Lisboa Belém Open – Men's singles =

Tennis tournament

Men's singles
- 2021 Lisboa Belém Open

Final
- Champion: (Kazakhstan) Dmitry Popko
- Runner-up: (Italy) Andrea Pellegrino
- Score: 6–2, 6–4

Events
Singles	men	women
Doubles	men	women
- Lisboa Belém Open

Jaume Munar was the defending champion but chose not to defend his title.

Dmitry Popko won the title after defeating Andrea Pellegrino 6–2, 6–4 in the final.

== Seeds ==
1. (Brazil) Thiago Monteiro (second round)
2. (Japan) Taro Daniel (first round)
3. (France) Hugo Gaston (semifinals)
4. (Slovakia) Andrej Martin (semifinals, retired)
5. (Serbia) Nikola Milojević (quarterfinals)
6. (Germany) Cedrik-Marcel Stebe (quarterfinals, retired)
7. (Italy) Alessandro Giannessi (withdrew)
8. (Kazakhstan) Dmitry Popko (champion)

== Draw ==
Key

- Q = Qualifier
- WC = Wild card
- LL = Lucky loser
- Alt = Alternate
- ITF = ITF entry
- PR = Protected ranking
- SR = Special ranking
- SE = Special exempt
- JE = Junior exempt
- JR = Junior Accelerator Programme entrant
- CO = College Accelerator Programme entrant
- NG = Next Gen Accelerator Program entrant
- w/o = Walkover
- r = Retired
- d = Defaulted

=== Finals ===
Semifinals
(Italy) Andrea Pellegrino	7^{7}	1
4	(Slovakia) Andrej Martin	6^{5}	0^{r}
3	(France) Hugo Gaston	3	4
8	(Kazakhstan) Dmitry Popko	6	6

Final
(Italy) Andrea Pellegrino	2	4
8	(Kazakhstan) Dmitry Popko	6	6

=== Top half ===
First round
1	(Brazil) T Monteiro	6	6
(France) A Müller	4	4
(Netherlands) I Sijsling	0	4
(Italy) A Pellegrino	6	6
(Portugal) F Ferreira Silva	6	6
(France) T Lamasine	3	4
(Italy) G Zeppieri	4	6	6
Q	(Argentina) S Rodríguez Taverna	6	3	4
4	(Slovakia) A Martin	4	6	6
(Dominican Republic) R Cid Subervi	6	4	0
WC	(Portugal) G Oliveira	7^{7}	6
WC	(Portugal) Pedro Araújo	6^{4}	4
PR	(Morocco) E Benchetrit	2	2
(France) C Lestienne	6	6
Q	(Germany) S Fanselow	4	4
5	(Serbia) N Milojević	6	6

Second round
1	(Brazil) T Monteiro	3	6^{8}
(Italy) A Pellegrino	6	7^{10}
(Portugal) F Ferreira Silva	6^{3}	6	6
(Italy) G Zeppieri	7^{7}	4	0
4	(Slovakia) A Martin	2	6	6
WC	(Portugal) G Oliveira	6	4	3
(France) C Lestienne	5	4
5	(Serbia) N Milojević	7	6

Quarterfinals
(Italy) A Pellegrino	6	6
(Portugal) F Ferreira Silva	3	1
4	(Slovakia) A Martin	6	6
5	(Serbia) N Milojević	4	4

Semifinals
(Italy) A Pellegrino	7^{7}	1
4	(Slovakia) A Martin	6^{5}	0^{r}

=== Bottom half ===
First round
6	(Germany) C-M Stebe	6	6
LL	(Italy) J Berrettini	0	1
(Belgium) M Geerts	6	3	4
(Portugal) N Borges	4	6	6
(Netherlands) R Haase	6	4	6
(Italy) F Baldi	4	6	4
(Italy) F Forti	3	1
3	(France) H Gaston	6	6
8	(Kazakhstan) D Popko	1	6	4
(Italy) L Giustino	6	3	1^{r}
(Italy) A Arnaboldi	2	6	6^{8}
Q	(Germany) B Hassan	6	3	7^{10}
(Portugal) J Domingues	6	6
WC	(Portugal) T Cação	4	4
Q	(Poland) D Michalski	7^{7}	5	6
2	(Japan) T Daniel	6^{4}	7	2

Second round
6	(Germany) C-M Stebe	4	7^{7}	6
(Portugal) N Borges	6	6^{4}	4
(Netherlands) R Haase	6	6^{5}	3
3	(France) H Gaston	4	7^{7}	6
8	(Kazakhstan) D Popko	6	6
Q	(Germany) B Hassan	2	4
(Portugal) J Domingues	6	6
Q	(Poland) D Michalski	2	2

Quarterfinals
6	(Germany) C-M Stebe	6^{3}	3^{r}
3	(France) H Gaston	7^{7}	4
8	(Kazakhstan) D Popko	6^{4}	7	6
(Portugal) J Domingues	7^{7}	5	0

Semifinals
3	(France) H Gaston	3	4
8	(Kazakhstan) D Popko	6	6
