= 2020 Lisboa Belém Open – Doubles =

Doubles
- 2020 Lisboa Belém Open

Final
- Champions: (Dominican Republic) Roberto Cid Subervi (Portugal) Gonçalo Oliveira
- Runners-up: (Finland) Harri Heliövaara (Czech Republic) Zdeněk Kolář
- Score: 7–6^{(7–5)}, 4–6, [10–4]

Events
Singles	Doubles
- Lisboa Belém Open

Philipp Oswald and Filip Polášek were the defending champions but chose not to defend their title.

Roberto Cid Subervi and Gonçalo Oliveira won the title after defeating Harri Heliövaara and Zdeněk Kolář 7–6^{(7–5)}, 4–6, [10–4] in the final.

== Seeds ==
1. (Monaco) Romain Arneodo / (Brazil) Fernando Romboli (first round)
2. (Philippines) Treat Huey / (United States) Nathaniel Lammons (withdrew)
3. (United States) Robert Galloway / (Ukraine) Denys Molchanov (quarterfinals)
4. (United States) James Cerretani / (Austria) Tristan-Samuel Weissborn (first round)

== Draw ==
Key

- Q = Qualifier
- WC = Wild card
- LL = Lucky loser
- Alt = Alternate
- ITF = ITF entry
- PR = Protected ranking
- SR = Special ranking
- SE = Special exempt
- JE = Junior exempt
- JR = Junior Accelerator Programme entrant
- CO = College Accelerator Programme entrant
- NG = Next Gen Accelerator Program entrant
- w/o = Walkover
- r = Retired
- d = Defaulted

First round
1	(Monaco) R Arneodo (Brazil) F Romboli	6^{5}	2
(Brazil) O Luz (Brazil) J Menezes	7^{7}	6
(Kazakhstan) D Popko (Chinese Taipei) T-h Yang	2	1
WC	(Portugal) N Borges (Portugal) F Cabral	6	6
3	(United States) R Galloway (Ukraine) D Molchanov	6	6
(Croatia) I Sabanov (Croatia) M Sabanov	3	4
(Portugal) J Domingues (Portugal) P Sousa	1	6	[7]
(Dominican Republic) R Cid Subervi (Portugal) G Oliveira	6	4	[10]
WC	(Portugal) Gonçalo Falcão (Portugal) Luís Faria	4	3
(United Kingdom) L Glasspool (United States) A Lawson	6	6
(Finland) H Heliövaara (Czech Republic) Z Kolář	6	6
4	(United States) J Cerretani (Austria) T-S Weissborn	1	4
(Bosnia and Herzegovina) D Džumhur (Serbia) P Krstin	6	4	[2]^{r}
WC	(Portugal) T Cação (Portugal) João Monteiro	2	6	[4]
(Peru) S Galdós (Brazil) R Matos	6	4	[4]
Alt	(Chinese Taipei) C-h Tseng (Poland) K Żuk	3	6	[10]

Quarterfinals
(Brazil) O Luz (Brazil) J Menezes	6	5	[5]
WC	(Portugal) N Borges (Portugal) F Cabral	2	7	[10]
3	(United States) R Galloway (Ukraine) D Molchanov	6	3	[4]
(Dominican Republic) R Cid Subervi (Portugal) G Oliveira	1	6	[10]
(United Kingdom) L Glasspool (United States) A Lawson	7^{7}	4	[5]
(Finland) H Heliövaara (Czech Republic) Z Kolář	6^{4}	6	[10]
WC	(Portugal) T Cação (Portugal) J Monteiro	4	4
Alt	(Chinese Taipei) C-h Tseng (Poland) K Żuk	6	6

Semifinals
WC	(Portugal) N Borges (Portugal) F Cabral	6	3	[8]
(Dominican Republic) R Cid Subervi (Portugal) G Oliveira	3	6	[10]
(Finland) H Heliövaara (Czech Republic) Z Kolář	4	6	[10]
Alt	(Chinese Taipei) C-h Tseng (Poland) K Żuk	6	1	[7]

Final
(Dominican Republic) R Cid Subervi (Portugal) G Oliveira	7^{7}	4	[10]
(Finland) H Heliövaara (Czech Republic) Z Kolář	6^{5}	6	[4]
