= 2018 Lisboa Belém Open – Doubles =

Doubles
- 2018 Lisboa Belém Open

Final
- Champions: (El Salvador) Marcelo Arévalo (Mexico) Miguel Ángel Reyes-Varela
- Runners-up: (Poland) Tomasz Bednarek (United States) Hunter Reese
- Score: 6–3, 3–6, [10–1]

Events
| Singles | Doubles |
- Lisboa Belém Open

Ruan Roelofse and Christopher Rungkat were the defending champions but chose not to defend their title.

Marcelo Arévalo and Miguel Ángel Reyes-Varela won the title after defeating Tomasz Bednarek and Hunter Reese 6–3, 3–6, [10–1] in the final.

== Seeds ==
1. (Netherlands) Sander Arends / (Canada) Adil Shamasdin (semifinals)
2. (El Salvador) Marcelo Arévalo / (Mexico) Miguel Ángel Reyes-Varela (champions)
3. (Peru) Sergio Galdós / (Brazil) Fabrício Neis (quarterfinals)
4. (Croatia) Marin Draganja / (Croatia) Tomislav Draganja (semifinals)

== Draw ==
Key

- Q = Qualifier
- WC = Wild card
- LL = Lucky loser
- Alt = Alternate
- ITF = ITF entry
- PR = Protected ranking
- SR = Special ranking
- SE = Special exempt
- JE = Junior exempt
- JR = Junior Accelerator Programme entrant
- CO = College Accelerator Programme entrant
- NG = Next Gen Accelerator Program entrant
- w/o = Walkover
- r = Retired
- d = Defaulted

First round
1 | (Netherlands) S Arends (Canada) A Shamasdin | 2 | 7^{7} | [10]
(Spain) G Granollers (Spain) J Munar | 6 | 6^{2} | [8]
(United States) E King (United States) N Pasha | 6 | 6
WC | (Portugal) Luís Faria (Portugal) Martim Leote Prata | 1 | 2
3 | (Peru) S Galdós (Brazil) F Neis | 6 | 6
WC | (Portugal) T Cação (Portugal) P Sousa | 4 | 2
(Poland) T Bednarek (United States) H Reese | 6 | 6
(United Kingdom) L Broady (United Kingdom) S Clayton | 2 | 3
WC | (Portugal) Francisco Dias (Portugal) Gonçalo Falcão | 5 | 6 | [10]
(United States) N Lammons (Portugal) G Oliveira | 7 | 3 | [6]
(United States) R Galloway (Sweden) A Siljeström | 6^{0} | 4
4 | (Croatia) M Draganja (Croatia) T Draganja | 7^{7} | 6
(Spain) T Robredo (Spain) D Vega Hernández | 6 | 6
(Australia) A de Minaur (Australia) M Reid | 3 | 3
(Portugal) F Gil (France) S Robert | 1 | 4
2 | (El Salvador) M Arévalo (Mexico) MÁ Reyes-Varela | 6 | 6

Quarterfinals
1 | (Netherlands) S Arends (Canada) A Shamasdin | 7^{9} | 6
(United States) E King (United States) N Pasha | 6^{7} | 1
3 | (Peru) S Galdós (Brazil) F Neis | 4 | 1
(Poland) T Bednarek (United States) H Reese | 6 | 6
WC | (Portugal) F Dias (Portugal) G Falcão | 0 | 2
4 | (Croatia) M Draganja (Croatia) T Draganja | 6 | 6
(Spain) T Robredo (Spain) D Vega Hernández | 6 | 1 | [6]
2 | (El Salvador) M Arévalo (Mexico) MÁ Reyes-Varela | 2 | 6 | [10]

Semifinals
1 | (Netherlands) S Arends (Canada) A Shamasdin | 4 | 6 | [8]
(Poland) T Bednarek (United States) H Reese | 6 | 2 | [10]
4 | (Croatia) M Draganja (Croatia) T Draganja | 7 | 6^{6} | [9]
2 | (El Salvador) M Arévalo (Mexico) MÁ Reyes-Varela | 5 | 7^{8} | [11]

Final
(Poland) T Bednarek (United States) H Reese | 3 | 6 | [1]
2 | (El Salvador) M Arévalo (Mexico) MÁ Reyes-Varela | 6 | 3 | [10]
