= 2022 Lisboa Belém Open – Men's doubles =

Men's doubles
- 2022 Lisboa Belém Open

Final
- Champions: (Czech Republic) Zdeněk Kolář (Portugal) Gonçalo Oliveira
- Runners-up: (Ukraine) Vladyslav Manafov (Ukraine) Oleg Prihodko
- Score: 6–1, 7–6^{(7–4)}

Events
Singles	men	women
Doubles	men	women
- Lisboa Belém Open

Jeevan Nedunchezhiyan and Purav Raja were the defending champions but only Nedunchezhiyan chose to defend his title, partnering Christopher Rungkat. Nedunchezhiyan lost in the semifinals to Vladyslav Manafov and Oleg Prihodko.

Zdeněk Kolář and Gonçalo Oliveira won the title after defeating Manafov and Prihodko 6–1, 7–6^{(7–4)} in the final.

== Seeds ==
1. (France) Manuel Guinard / (Venezuela) Luis David Martínez (semifinals)
2. (Ukraine) Vladyslav Manafov / (Ukraine) Oleg Prihodko (final)
3. (Czech Republic) Zdeněk Kolář / (Portugal) Gonçalo Oliveira (champions)
4. (India) Jeevan Nedunchezhiyan / (Indonesia) Christopher Rungkat (semifinals)

== Draw ==
Key

- Q = Qualifier
- WC = Wild card
- LL = Lucky loser
- Alt = Alternate
- ITF = ITF entry
- PR = Protected ranking
- SR = Special ranking
- SE = Special exempt
- JE = Junior exempt
- JR = Junior Accelerator Programme entrant
- CO = College Accelerator Programme entrant
- NG = Next Gen Accelerator Program entrant
- w/o = Walkover
- r = Retired
- d = Defaulted

First round
1	(France) M Guinard (Venezuela) LD Martínez	6	6
WC	(Portugal) Fábio Coelho (Portugal) J Faria	2	2
PR	(Germany) Jeremy Jahn (Poland) D Michalski	4	4
(Poland) P Matuszewski (Czech Republic) P Nouza	6	6
3	(Czech Republic) Z Kolář (Portugal) G Oliveira	6	7^{7}
Alt	(Czech Republic) V Kopřiva (Czech Republic) J Pospíšil	3	6^{4}
(Italy) F Agamenone (Italy) G Zeppieri	4	3
(Dominican Republic) N Hardt (Australia) J Taylor	6	6
(Australia) A Santillan (Australia) B Walkin	5	5
Alt	(Portugal) Pedro Araújo (Portugal) D Vale	7	7
WC	(Portugal) Gonçalo Falcão (Portugal) P Sousa	5	0
4	(India) J Nedunchezhiyan (Indonesia) C Rungkat	7	6
Alt	(Switzerland) R Bertola (Germany) Lucas Gerch	6	3	[10]
(Spain) Í Cervantes (Spain) O Roca Batalla	4	6	[7]
(India) A Chandrasekar (India) VS Prashanth	1	6	[10]
2	(Ukraine) V Manafov (Ukraine) O Prihodko	6	3	[12]

Quarterfinals
1	(France) M Guinard (Venezuela) LD Martínez	4	6	[10]
(Poland) P Matuszewski (Czech Republic) P Nouza	6	3	[8]
3	(Czech Republic) Z Kolář (Portugal) G Oliveira	6	6
(Dominican Republic) N Hardt (Australia) J Taylor	2	2
Alt	(Portugal) P Araújo (Portugal) D Vale	4	1
4	(India) J Nedunchezhiyan (Indonesia) C Rungkat	6	6
Alt	(Switzerland) R Bertola (Germany) L Gerch
2	(Ukraine) V Manafov (Ukraine) O Prihodko	w/o

Semifinals
1	(France) M Guinard (Venezuela) LD Martínez	1	2
3	(Czech Republic) Z Kolář (Portugal) G Oliveira	6	6
4	(India) J Nedunchezhiyan (Indonesia) C Rungkat	4	2
2	(Ukraine) V Manafov (Ukraine) O Prihodko	6	6

Final
3	(Czech Republic) Z Kolář (Portugal) G Oliveira	6	7^{7}
2	(Ukraine) V Manafov (Ukraine) O Prihodko	1	6^{4}
