= 2019 Lisboa Belém Open – Doubles =

Doubles
- 2019 Lisboa Belém Open

Final
- Champions: (Austria) Philipp Oswald (Slovakia) Filip Polášek
- Runners-up: (Argentina) Guido Andreozzi (Argentina) Guillermo Durán
- Score: 7–5, 6–2

Events
Singles	Doubles
- Lisboa Belém Open

Marcelo Arévalo and Miguel Ángel Reyes-Varela were the defending champions but chose not to defend their title.

Philipp Oswald and Filip Polášek won the title after defeating Guido Andreozzi and Guillermo Durán 7–5, 6–2 in the final.

== Seeds ==
1. (China) Gong Maoxin / (China) Zhang Ze (quarterfinals)
2. (United States) James Cerretani / (United States) Nicholas Monroe (first round)
3. (Argentina) Guido Andreozzi / (Argentina) Guillermo Durán (final)
4. (Austria) Philipp Oswald / (Slovakia) Filip Polášek (champions)

== Draw ==
Key

- Q = Qualifier
- WC = Wild card
- LL = Lucky loser
- Alt = Alternate
- ITF = ITF entry
- PR = Protected ranking
- SR = Special ranking
- SE = Special exempt
- JE = Junior exempt
- JR = Junior Accelerator Programme entrant
- CO = College Accelerator Programme entrant
- NG = Next Gen Accelerator Program entrant
- w/o = Walkover
- r = Retired
- d = Defaulted

First round
1	(China) M Gong (China) Ze Zhang	6	7
(Venezuela) LD Martínez (Brazil) F Romboli	3	5
(Brazil) F Neis (Spain) D Vega Hernández	6	6^{3}	[10]
(United Kingdom) S Clayton (United Kingdom) J O'Mara	2	7^{7}	[6]
4	(Austria) P Oswald (Slovakia) F Polášek	6	6
PR	(United States) N Lammons (United States) M Schnur	3	1
WC	(Portugal) F Cabral (Portugal) Gonçalo Falcão	6	7
WC	(Portugal) T Cação (Portugal) Luís Faria	1	5
ITF	(Spain) J Barranco Cosano (Italy) R Brancaccio	6	1	[4]
WC	(Portugal) F Gil (Portugal) B Saraiva	2	6	[10]
(France) J Eysseric (Croatia) A Šančić	2	0^{r}
3	(Argentina) G Andreozzi (Argentina) G Durán	6	0
(Uruguay) A Behar (Ecuador) G Escobar	6	6
ITF	(Italy) R Bonadio (France) G Jacq	4	3
(Spain) G Granollers (Spain) D Marrero	6	3	[10]
2	(United States) J Cerretani (United States) N Monroe	4	6	[7]

Quarterfinals
1	(China) M Gong (China) Ze Zhang	4	2
(Brazil) F Neis (Spain) D Vega Hernández	6	6
4	(Austria) P Oswald (Slovakia) F Polášek	6	6
WC	(Portugal) F Cabral (Portugal) G Falcão	3	4
WC	(Portugal) F Gil (Portugal) B Saraiva	2	4
3	(Argentina) G Andreozzi (Argentina) G Durán	6	6
(Uruguay) A Behar (Ecuador) G Escobar	6	3	[10]
(Spain) G Granollers (Spain) D Marrero	2	6	[12]

Semifinals
(Brazil) F Neis (Spain) D Vega Hernández	3	1
4	(Austria) P Oswald (Slovakia) F Polášek	6	6
3	(Argentina) G Andreozzi (Argentina) G Durán	6	2	[10]
(Spain) G Granollers (Spain) D Marrero	3	6	[8]

Final
4	(Austria) P Oswald (Slovakia) F Polášek	7	6
3	(Argentina) G Andreozzi (Argentina) G Durán	5	2
