= 2017 Lisboa Belém Open – Doubles =

Doubles
- 2017 Lisboa Belém Open

Final
- Champions: (South Africa) Ruan Roelofse (Indonesia) Christopher Rungkat
- Runners-up: (Portugal) Fred Gil (Portugal) Gonçalo Oliveira
- Score: 7–6^{(9–7)}, 6–1

Events
Singles	Doubles
- Lisboa Belém Open

This was the first edition of the tournament.

Ruan Roelofse and Christopher Rungkat won the title after defeating Fred Gil and Gonçalo Oliveira 7–6^{(9–7)}, 6–1 in the final.

== Seeds ==
1. (Germany) Kevin Krawietz / (Croatia) Antonio Šančić (quarterfinals)
2. (Australia) Steven de Waard / (New Zealand) Ben McLachlan (first round)
3. (United States) Sekou Bangoura / (Switzerland) Luca Margaroli (first round)
4. (Germany) Andreas Mies / (Germany) Oscar Otte (first round)

== Draw ==
Key

- Q = Qualifier
- WC = Wild card
- LL = Lucky loser
- Alt = Alternate
- ITF = ITF entry
- PR = Protected ranking
- SR = Special ranking
- SE = Special exempt
- JE = Junior exempt
- JR = Junior Accelerator Programme entrant
- CO = College Accelerator Programme entrant
- NG = Next Gen Accelerator Program entrant
- w/o = Walkover
- r = Retired
- d = Defaulted

First round
1	(Germany) K Krawietz (Croatia) A Šančić	6	7^{7}
(Japan) T Daniel (Spain) C Taberner	2	6^{2}
(South Africa) R Roelofse (Indonesia) C Rungkat	6	2	[10]
(Portugal) G Elias (Portugal) P Sousa	4	6	[7]
4	(Germany) A Mies (Germany) O Otte	4	7^{8}	[7]
(Poland) T Bednarek (Serbia) D Petrović	6	6^{6}	[10]
(Spain) R Carballés Baena (Argentina) F Coria	2	7^{7}	[10]
WC	(Portugal) F Cunha e Silva (Portugal) João Monteiro	6	6^{3}	[3]
(Hungary) A Balázs (Hungary) G Borsos	6	6
(Serbia) N Milojević (Kazakhstan) D Popko	2	2
(Poland) M Kowalczyk (Poland) G Panfil	7	5	[10]
3	(United States) S Bangoura (Switzerland) L Margaroli	5	7	[3]
WC	(Portugal) F Gil (Portugal) G Oliveira	6	6
PR	(Spain) D Muñoz de la Nava (Spain) R Ramírez Hidalgo	0	4
WC	(Portugal) J Domingues (Portugal) F Ferreira Silva	4	6	[10]
2	(Australia) S de Waard (New Zealand) B McLachlan	6	4	[5]

Quarterfinals
1	(Germany) K Krawietz (Croatia) A Šančić	4	6	[5]
(South Africa) R Roelofse (Indonesia) C Rungkat	6	4	[10]
(Poland) T Bednarek (Serbia) D Petrović	6	5	[8]
(Spain) R Carballés Baena (Argentina) F Coria	4	7	[10]
(Hungary) A Balázs (Hungary) G Borsos	4	6	[10]
(Poland) M Kowalczyk (Poland) G Panfil	6	4	[6]
WC	(Portugal) F Gil (Portugal) G Oliveira	6	6
WC	(Portugal) J Domingues (Portugal) F Ferreira Silva	4	3

Semifinals
(South Africa) R Roelofse (Indonesia) C Rungkat	6	6
(Spain) R Carballés Baena (Argentina) F Coria	2	0
(Hungary) A Balázs (Hungary) G Borsos	7^{7}	5	[6]
WC	(Portugal) F Gil (Portugal) G Oliveira	6^{5}	7	[10]

Final
(South Africa) R Roelofse (Indonesia) C Rungkat	7^{9}	6
WC	(Portugal) F Gil (Portugal) G Oliveira	6^{7}	1
