= 2017 Lisboa Belém Open – Singles =

Singles
- 2017 Lisboa Belém Open

Final
- Champion: (Germany) Oscar Otte
- Runner-up: (Japan) Taro Daniel
- Score: 4–6, 6–1, 6–3

Events
| Singles | Doubles |
- Lisboa Belém Open

This was the first edition of the tournament.

Oscar Otte won the title after defeating Taro Daniel 4–6, 6–1, 6–3 in the final.

== Seeds ==
1. (Bosnia and Herzegovina) Damir Džumhur (first round)
2. (Czech Republic) Adam Pavlásek (first round)
3. (Japan) Taro Daniel (final)
4. (Colombia) Santiago Giraldo (first round)
5. (Portugal) Gastão Elias (first round)
6. (Spain) Roberto Carballés Baena (second round)
7. (Portugal) Pedro Sousa (quarterfinals)
8. (Spain) Rubén Ramírez Hidalgo (first round)

== Draw ==
Key

- Q = Qualifier
- WC = Wild card
- LL = Lucky loser
- Alt = Alternate
- ITF = ITF entry
- PR = Protected ranking
- SR = Special ranking
- SE = Special exempt
- JE = Junior exempt
- JR = Junior Accelerator Programme entrant
- CO = College Accelerator Programme entrant
- NG = Next Gen Accelerator Program entrant
- w/o = Walkover
- r = Retired
- d = Defaulted

=== Finals ===
Semifinals
(Germany) Oscar Otte | 7^{7} | 6
(Hungary) Attila Balázs | 6^{3} | 2
3 | (Japan) Taro Daniel | 7^{7} | 7^{7}
(Italy) Gianluigi Quinzi | 6^{5} | 6^{5}

Final
(Germany) Oscar Otte | 4 | 6 | 6
3 | (Japan) Taro Daniel | 6 | 1 | 3

=== Top half ===
First round
1 | (Bosnia and Herzegovina) D Džumhur | 6 | 3 | 4
Q | (Spain) D Muñoz de la Nava | 3 | 6 | 6
(Czech Republic) Petr Michnev | 6 | 3 | 3
(Italy) M Donati | 2 | 6 | 6
(Germany) O Otte | 7 | 4 | 6
(Spain) R Ojeda Lara | 5 | 6 | 1
WC | (Portugal) A Gaspar Murta | 7 | 2 | 2
6 | (Spain) R Carballés Baena | 5 | 6 | 6
4 | (Colombia) S Giraldo | 3 | 3
(Hungary) A Balázs | 6 | 6
(India) P Gunneswaran | 5 | 4
(Portugal) J Domingues | 7 | 6
WC | (Portugal) F Ferreira Silva | 6 | 6
(Brazil) G Clezar | 2 | 4
(Belgium) J De Loore | 7^{7} | 6
5 | (Portugal) G Elias | 6^{2} | 4

Second round
Q | (Spain) D Muñoz de la Nava | 7^{8} | 3 | 6
(Italy) M Donati | 6^{6} | 6 | 4
(Germany) O Otte | 6 | 7^{7}
6 | (Spain) R Carballés Baena | 3 | 6^{1}
(Hungary) A Balázs | 6 | 6
(Portugal) J Domingues | 4 | 2
WC | (Portugal) F Ferreira Silva | 5 | 1
(Belgium) J De Loore | 7 | 6

Quarterfinals
Q | (Spain) D Muñoz de la Nava | 3 | 1
(Germany) O Otte | 6 | 6
(Hungary) A Balázs | 7^{7} | 6
(Belgium) J De Loore | 6^{5} | 3

Semifinals
(Germany) O Otte | 7^{7} | 6
(Hungary) A Balázs | 6^{3} | 2

=== Bottom half ===
First round
8 | (Spain) R Ramírez Hidalgo | 3 | 4
(France) G Sakharov | 6 | 6
WC | (Portugal) G Oliveira | 1 | 6 | 7^{7}
Q | (Ecuador) G Escobar | 6 | 3 | 6^{5}
(Australia) C O'Connell | 4 | 2
Q | (Romania) D Dima | 6 | 6
WC | (Portugal) João Monteiro | 3 | 6 | 2
3 | (Japan) T Daniel | 6 | 4 | 6
7 | (Portugal) P Sousa | 6 | 6
(Serbia) N Milojević | 1 | 1
(Argentina) F Coria | 6 | 6
(Kazakhstan) D Popko | 3 | 2
(South Africa) L Harris | 6 | 7^{7}
Q | (Poland) H Hurkacz | 4 | 6^{5}
(Italy) G Quinzi | 6 | 6
2 | (Czech Republic) A Pavlásek | 1 | 3

Second round
(France) G Sakharov | 6 | 5 | 6
WC | (Portugal) G Oliveira | 3 | 7 | 4
Q | (Romania) D Dima | 6^{2} | 3
3 | (Japan) T Daniel | 7^{7} | 6
7 | (Portugal) P Sousa | 2 | 7^{7} | 6
(Argentina) F Coria | 6 | 6^{5} | 0
(South Africa) L Harris | 1 | 4
(Italy) G Quinzi | 6 | 6

Quarterfinals
(France) G Sakharov | 2 | 1
3 | (Japan) T Daniel | 6 | 6
7 | (Portugal) P Sousa | 6 | 6^{5} | 2
(Italy) G Quinzi | 3 | 7^{7} | 6

Semifinals
3 | (Japan) T Daniel | 7^{7} | 7^{7}
(Italy) G Quinzi | 6^{5} | 6^{5}
