= 2023 Lisboa Belém Open – Men's singles =

Men's singles
- 2023 Lisboa Belém Open

Final
- Champion: (Italy) Flavio Cobolli
- Runner-up: (Lebanon) Benjamin Hassan
- Score: 7–5, 7–5

Events
Singles	men	women
Doubles	men	women
- Lisboa Belém Open

Marco Cecchinato was the defending champion but chose not to defend his title.

Flavio Cobolli won the title after defeating Benjamin Hassan 7–5, 7–5 in the final.

== Seeds ==
1. (Spain) Albert Ramos Viñolas (semifinals)
2. (Italy) Flavio Cobolli (champion)
3. (Kazakhstan) Timofey Skatov (first round)
4. (Spain) Pablo Llamas Ruiz (second round)
5. Ivan Gakhov (second round)
6. (France) Titouan Droguet (first round)
7. (Czech Republic) Zdeněk Kolář (first round)
8. (Italy) Matteo Gigante (first round)

== Draw ==
Key

- Q = Qualifier
- WC = Wild card
- LL = Lucky loser
- Alt = Alternate
- ITF = ITF entry
- PR = Protected ranking
- SR = Special ranking
- SE = Special exempt
- JE = Junior exempt
- JR = Junior Accelerator Programme entrant
- CO = College Accelerator Programme entrant
- NG = Next Gen Accelerator Program entrant
- w/o = Walkover
- r = Retired
- d = Defaulted

=== Finals ===
Semifinals
1	(Spain) Albert Ramos Viñolas	3	3
(Lebanon) Benjamin Hassan	6	6
(Italy) Franco Agamenone	4	1
2	(Italy) Flavio Cobolli	6	6

Final
(Lebanon) Benjamin Hassan	5	5
2	(Italy) Flavio Cobolli	7	7

=== Top half ===
First round
1	(Spain) A Ramos Viñolas	6	3	6
LL	(Switzerland) H Laaksonen	4	6	2
WC	(Portugal) G Elias	6	6
(Bosnia and Herzegovina) N Fatić	2	2
WC	(Portugal) J Sousa	6	7
LL	(Portugal) H Rocha	2	5
WC	(Portugal) P Sousa	6	6
6	(France) T Droguet	4	4
4	(Spain) P Llamas Ruiz	6	6
(Italy) A Giannessi	3	1
Q	(Spain) J Barranco Cosano	3	4
SE	(Spain) O Roca Batalla	6	6
Q	(Italy) F Forti	6	1	3
(Lebanon) B Hassan	3	6	6
(France) G Blancaneaux	4	2
5	I Gakhov	6	6

Second round
1	(Spain) A Ramos Viñolas	7^{9}	6
WC	(Portugal) G Elias	6^{7}	4
WC	(Portugal) J Sousa	6	6
WC	(Portugal) P Sousa	2	3
4	(Spain) P Llamas Ruiz	4	6^{2}
SE	(Spain) O Roca Batalla	6	7^{7}
(Lebanon) B Hassan	7	6
5	I Gakhov	5	1

Quarterfinals
1	(Spain) A Ramos Viñolas	6	6
WC	(Portugal) J Sousa	4	2
SE	(Spain) O Roca Batalla	6^{1}	4
(Lebanon) B Hassan	7^{7}	6

Semifinals
1	(Spain) A Ramos Viñolas	3	3
(Lebanon) B Hassan	6	6

=== Bottom half ===
First round
8	(Italy) M Gigante	4	6^{4}
(Italy) F Agamenone	6	7^{7}
(Italy) S Travaglia	6	2	6^{1}
Q	(Croatia) L Mikrut	1	6	7^{7}
(Hungary) M Valkusz	6	6^{4}	0^{r}
(Italy) Edoardo Lavagno	3	7^{7}	0
(Italy) R Bonadio	6	6
3	(Kazakhstan) T Skatov	4	3
7	(Czech Republic) Z Kolář	4	3
(Belgium) G-A Bailly	6	6
Q	(Italy) Alexander Weis	1	3
(France) C Hemery	6	6
Q	(Ukraine) O Krutykh	5	6	6
(South Korea) G Campaña Lee	7	2	3
Q	(Italy) E Dalla Valle	4	7	0
2	(Italy) F Cobolli	6	5	6

Second round
(Italy) F Agamenone	7^{7}	6
Q	(Croatia) L Mikrut	6^{4}	3
(Italy) E Lavagno	6	3	2
(Italy) R Bonadio	3	6	6
(Belgium) G-A Bailly	5	7^{7}	1
(France) C Hemery	7	6^{4}	6
Q	(Ukraine) O Krutykh	6^{2}	3
2	(Italy) F Cobolli	7^{7}	6

Quarterfinals
(Italy) F Agamenone	7^{7}	7
(Italy) R Bonadio	6^{5}	5
(France) C Hemery	4	3
2	(Italy) F Cobolli	6	6

Semifinals
(Italy) F Agamenone	4	1
2	(Italy) F Cobolli	6	6
