= 2026 Lisboa Belém Open – Men's singles =

Men's singles
- 2026 Lisboa Belém Open

Final
- Champion: (Switzerland) Alexander Ritschard
- Runner-up: Svyatoslav Gulin
- Score: 6–2, 6–1

Events
Singles	men	women
Doubles	men	women
- Lisboa Belém Open

Vilius Gaubas was the defending champion but lost in the first round to Marco Cecchinato.

Alexander Ritschard won the title after defeating Svyatoslav Gulin 6–2, 6–1 in the final.

== Seeds ==
1. (Argentina) Marco Trungelliti (semifinals)
2. (Portugal) Henrique Rocha (quarterfinals)
3. (Hungary) Zsombor Piros (withdrew)
4. (Spain) Pedro Martínez (withdrew)
5. (Spain) Max Alcalá Gurri (second round)
6. (Lithuania) Vilius Gaubas (first round)
7. (Italy) Andrea Pellegrino (quarterfinals)
8. (Spain) Nikolás Sánchez Izquierdo (first round)

== Draw ==
Key

- Q = Qualifier
- WC = Wild card
- LL = Lucky loser
- Alt = Alternate
- ITF = ITF entry
- PR = Protected ranking
- SR = Special ranking
- SE = Special exempt
- JE = Junior exempt
- JR = Junior Accelerator Programme entrant
- CO = College Accelerator Programme entrant
- NG = Next Gen Accelerator Program entrant
- w/o = Walkover
- r = Retired
- d = Defaulted

=== Finals ===
Semifinals
1	(Argentina) Marco Trungelliti	1	4
Q	(Switzerland) Alexander Ritschard	6	6
LL	Svyatoslav Gulin	4	7	7
(Denmark) Elmer Møller	6	5	5

Final
Q	(Switzerland) Alexander Ritschard	6	6
LL	Svyatoslav Gulin	2	1

=== Top half ===
First round
1	(Argentina) M Trungelliti	7^{7}	4	6
Alt	(Portugal) T Pereira	6^{5}	6	1
WC	(Portugal) Diogo Morais	0	3
(Italy) CA Caniato	6	6
(Croatia) M Dodig	6	6
Q	(Portugal) J Domingues	1	3
(Italy) M Cecchinato	6	6
6	(Lithuania) V Gaubas	4	3
Q	(Spain) C Taberner	1	5
Q	(Switzerland) A Ritschard	6	7
(Italy) R Brancaccio	6	6
(France) C Hemery	1	4
(India) S Nagal	6	6
Q	(Spain) A Sánchez Quílez	4	2
Q	(Lebanon) B Hassan	6	1	6
8	(Spain) N Sánchez Izquierdo	3	6	3

Second round
1	(Argentina) M Trungelliti	4	7^{7}	6
(Italy) CA Caniato	6	6^{3}	3
(Croatia) M Dodig	6	4	6
(Italy) M Cecchinato	1	6	2
Q	(Switzerland) A Ritschard	6	4	6
(Italy) R Brancaccio	4	6	4
(India) S Nagal	7^{7}	2
Q	(Lebanon) B Hassan	6^{5}	0^{r}

Quarterfinals
1	(Argentina) M Trungelliti	6	6
(Croatia) M Dodig	4	2
Q	(Switzerland) A Ritschard	7	6
(India) S Nagal	5	2

Semifinals
1	(Argentina) M Trungelliti	1	4
Q	(Switzerland) A Ritschard	6	6

=== Bottom half ===
First round
7	(Italy) A Pellegrino	1
(Spain) P Martín Tiffon	3^{r}
(Italy) F Passaro	6	6
WC	(Portugal) G Elias	2	2
WC	(Portugal) T Torres	3	3
LL	(Slovakia) A Martin	6	6
Q	(Switzerland) Patrick Schön	1	1
LL	Svyatoslav Gulin	6	6
5	(Spain) M Alcalá Gurri	6	6
(Ecuador) A Andrade	4	2
(United States) T Boyer	5	2
(Denmark) E Møller	7	6
(Brazil) T Monteiro	6	7^{7}
(Spain) A Moro Cañas	3	6^{4}
Alt	(United States) Dali Blanch	4	5
2	(Portugal) H Rocha	6	7

Second round
7	(Italy) A Pellegrino	w/o
(Italy) F Passaro
LL	(Slovakia) A Martin	6	0	2
LL	S Gulin	1	6	6
5	(Spain) M Alcalá Gurri	4	6	3
(Denmark) E Møller	6	2	6
(Brazil) T Monteiro	4	6	3
2	(Portugal) H Rocha	6	3	6

Quarterfinals
7	(Italy) A Pellegrino	5	0
LL	S Gulin	7	6
(Denmark) E Møller	6	6
2	(Portugal) H Rocha	2	4

Semifinals
LL	S Gulin	4	7	7
(Denmark) E Møller	6	5	5
