= 2024 Lisboa Belém Open – Women's singles =

Women's singles
- 2024 Lisboa Belém Open

Final
- Champion: (Andorra) Victoria Jiménez Kasintseva
- Runner-up: (Spain) Guiomar Maristany
- Score: 6–4, 6–2

Events
Singles	men	women
Doubles	men	women
← 2023 ·	Lisboa Belém Open	· 2025 →

Katarina Zavatska was the defending champion but chose not to participate.

Victoria Jiménez Kasintseva won the title, defeating Guiomar Maristany in the final; 6–4, 6–2.

== Seeds ==
1. (Netherlands) Arantxa Rus (quarterfinals)
2. (Serbia) Olga Danilović (first round)
3. (France) Chloé Paquet (second round)
4. (Spain) Marina Bassols Ribera (second round)
5. (Croatia) Lea Bošković (first round)
6. (United Kingdom) Francesca Jones (quarterfinals)
7. Anastasia Zakharova (second round)
8. (Spain) Leyre Romero Gormaz (first round)

== Draw ==
=== Key ===
- Q = Qualifier
- WC = Wild card
- LL = Lucky loser
- Alt = Alternate
- SE = Special exempt
- PR = Protected ranking
- ITF = ITF entry
- JE = Junior exempt
- w/o = Walkover
- r = Retired
- d = Defaulted
- SR = Special ranking

=== Finals ===
Semifinals
(Spain) Guiomar Maristany	6	4	6
Q	(Switzerland) Ylena In-Albon	0	6	0
(Andorra) Victoria Jiménez Kasintseva	6	6
Q	(Spain) Ángela Fita Boluda	1	4

Final
(Spain) Guiomar Maristany	4	2
(Andorra) Victoria Jiménez Kasintseva	6	6

=== Top half ===
First round
1	(Netherlands) A Rus	6	6
(France) H Tan	3	0
(France) A Hesse	6	6
Q	(France) A Ramé	3	3
WC	(Portugal) T Franco Dias	2	4
WC	(Portugal) S Lança	6	6
(Spain) G Maristany	7^{7}	6
5	(Croatia) L Bošković	6^{1}	3
3	(France) C Paquet	1	6	6
Q	(Brazil) G Cé	6	1	4
Q	(Switzerland) Y In-Albon	6	2	6
Q	(Netherlands) A Koevermans	4	6	2
Q	(Ukraine) O Oliynykova	3	6	6^{3}
(Switzerland) S Waltert	6	4	7^{7}
(Greece) D Papamichail	5	2
7	A Zakharova	7	6

Second round
1	(Netherlands) A Rus	2	6	5
(France) A Hesse	6	3	0^{r}
WC	(Portugal) S Lança	2	1
(Spain) G Maristany	6	6
3	(France) C Paquet	2	5
Q	(Switzerland) Y In-Albon	6	7
(Switzerland) S Waltert	6	6
7	A Zakharova	2	2

Quarterfinals
1	(Netherlands) A Rus	3	4
(Spain) G Maristany	6	6
Q	(Switzerland) Y In-Albon	7^{8}	2	7^{7}
(Switzerland) S Waltert	6^{6}	6	6^{3}

Semifinals
(Spain) G Maristany	6	4	6
Q	(Switzerland) Y In-Albon	0	6	0

=== Bottom half ===
First round
8	(Spain) L Romero Gormaz	0	4
(France) C Monnet	6	6
WC	(Portugal) F Laúndes	0	1
Q	(Italy) D Chiesa	6	6
(Portugal) F Jorge	2	4
(Andorra) V Jiménez Kasintseva	6	6
SR	(Germany) N Schunk	6	3	1
4	(Spain) M Bassols Ribera	4	6	6
6	(United Kingdom) F Jones	6	6
LL	(Czech Republic) J Malečková	2	1
Q	(Burundi) S Nahimana	6	6
WC	(Portugal) MdC Parreira	0	2
(France) K Mladenovic	6	2	4
Q	(Spain) Á Fita Boluda	3	6	6
(Romania) M Bulgaru	7	6
2	(Serbia) O Danilović	5	0

Second round
(France) C Monnet	6	6
Q	(Italy) D Chiesa	2	2
(Andorra) V Jiménez Kasintseva	6	6
4	(Spain) M Bassols Ribera	0	4
6	(United Kingdom) F Jones	6	6
Q	(Burundi) S Nahimana	1	1
Q	(Spain) Á Fita Boluda	6	1
(Romania) M Bulgaru	4	0^{r}

Quarterfinals
(France) C Monnet	6	6^{3}	3
(Andorra) V Jiménez Kasintseva	0	7^{7}	6
6	(United Kingdom) F Jones	2	5
Q	(Spain) Á Fita Boluda	6	7

Semifinals
(Andorra) V Jiménez Kasintseva	6	6
Q	(Spain) Á Fita Boluda	1	4
