= 2022 Lisboa Belém Open – Men's singles =

Men's singles
- 2022 Lisboa Belém Open

Final
- Champion: (Italy) Marco Cecchinato
- Runner-up: (France) Luca Van Assche
- Score: 6–3, 6–3

Events
Singles	men	women
Doubles	men	women
- Lisboa Belém Open

Dmitry Popko was the defending champion but chose not to defend his title.

Marco Cecchinato won the title after defeating Luca Van Assche 6–3, 6–3 in the final.

== Seeds ==
1. (Argentina) Pedro Cachin (first round)
2. (Spain) Carlos Taberner (quarterfinals)
3. (Italy) Francesco Passaro (second round)
4. (Austria) Filip Misolic (semifinals, retired)
5. (Italy) Marco Cecchinato (champion)
6. (Italy) Franco Agamenone (second round)
7. (France) Alexandre Müller (quarterfinals)
8. (France) Manuel Guinard (first round)

== Draw ==
Key

- Q = Qualifier
- WC = Wild card
- LL = Lucky loser
- Alt = Alternate
- ITF = ITF entry
- PR = Protected ranking
- SR = Special ranking
- SE = Special exempt
- JE = Junior exempt
- JR = Junior Accelerator Programme entrant
- CO = College Accelerator Programme entrant
- NG = Next Gen Accelerator Program entrant
- w/o = Walkover
- r = Retired
- d = Defaulted

=== Finals ===
Semifinals
Q	(France) Luca Van Assche	6	0
4	(Austria) Filip Misolic	1	0^{r}
Alt	(Kazakhstan) Timofey Skatov	5	6^{2}
5	(Italy) Marco Cecchinato	7	7^{7}

Final
Q	(France) Luca Van Assche	3	3
5	(Italy) Marco Cecchinato	6	6

=== Top half ===
First round
1	(Argentina) P Cachin	2	7^{7}	6^{4}
(Portugal) G Elias	6	6^{3}	7^{7}
(Italy) R Bonadio	6	1	6^{4}
Q	(France) L Van Assche	4	6	7^{7}
(Czech Republic) Z Kolář	1	6	3
Q	(Croatia) D Ajduković	6	4	6
WC	(Portugal) J Domingues	7^{7}	2	3
7	(France) A Müller	6^{5}	6	6
4	(Austria) F Misolic	7	6
(Italy) A Pellegrino	5	2
WC	(Portugal) P Sousa	6	4	1
(Czech Republic) V Kopřiva	4	6	6
Q	(Germany) Jeremy Jahn	5	4
(Italy) G Zeppieri	7	6
SE	(United States) N Moreno de Alboran	4	5
6	(Italy) F Agamenone	6	7

Second round
(Portugal) G Elias	3	2
Q	(France) L Van Assche	6	6
Q	(Croatia) D Ajduković	1	3
7	(France) A Müller	6	6
4	(Austria) F Misolic	2	6	6
(Czech Republic) V Kopřiva	6	2	3
(Italy) G Zeppieri	4	6	6
6	(Italy) F Agamenone	6	0	1

Quarterfinals
Q	(France) L Van Assche	6	7
7	(France) A Müller	4	5
4	(Austria) F Misolic	6	6
(Italy) G Zeppieri	4	4

Semifinals
Q	(France) L Van Assche	6	0
4	(Austria) F Misolic	1	0^{r}

=== Bottom half ===
First round
8	(France) M Guinard	3	6^{4}
(Italy) GM Moroni	6	7^{7}
(France) B Paire	7	6
Q	(Portugal) G Oliveira	5	4
Q	(Spain) O Roca Batalla	6^{8}	6^{5}
Alt	(Kazakhstan) T Skatov	7^{10}	7^{7}
WC	(Portugal) F Ferreira Silva	4	6	1
3	(Italy) F Passaro	6	3	6
5	(Italy) M Cecchinato	6	6
LL	(Poland) D Michalski	1	2
Alt	(Serbia) M Zekić	4	4
(Italy) G Mager	6	6
Q	(Spain) J Barranco Cosano	4	2
(Serbia) N Milojević	6	6
(Germany) C-M Stebe	4	4
2	(Spain) C Taberner	6	6

Second round
(Italy) GM Moroni	4	3^{r}
(France) B Paire	6	4
Alt	(Kazakhstan) T Skatov	6	5	6
3	(Italy) F Passaro	1	7	1
5	(Italy) M Cecchinato	6	7^{7}
(Italy) G Mager	1	6^{2}
(Serbia) N Milojević	0	7^{8}	6^{5}
2	(Spain) C Taberner	6	6^{6}	7^{7}

Quarterfinals
(France) B Paire	4	6	5
Alt	(Kazakhstan) T Skatov	6	2	7
5	(Italy) M Cecchinato	7^{7}	6
2	(Spain) C Taberner	6^{2}	4

Semifinals
Alt	(Kazakhstan) T Skatov	5	6^{2}
5	(Italy) M Cecchinato	7	7^{7}
