= 2024 Lisboa Belém Open – Men's singles =

Men's singles
- 2024 Lisboa Belém Open

Final
- Champion: (Switzerland) Alexander Ritschard
- Runner-up: (Belgium) Raphaël Collignon
- Score: 6–3, 6–7^{(3–7)}, 6–3

Events
Singles	men	women
Doubles	men	women
- Lisboa Belém Open

Flavio Cobolli was the defending champion but chose not to defend his title.

Alexander Ritschard won the title after defeating Raphaël Collignon 6–3, 6–7^{(3–7)}, 6–3 in the final.

== Seeds ==
1. (Brazil) Thiago Monteiro (withdrew)
2. (Germany) Daniel Altmaier (first round)
3. (Brazil) Thiago Seyboth Wild (first round)
4. (Argentina) Thiago Agustín Tirante (quarterfinals)
5. (Slovakia) Jozef Kovalík (second round)
6. (Serbia) Laslo Djere (withdrew)
7. (Switzerland) Alexander Ritschard (champion)
8. (Colombia) Daniel Elahi Galán (first round)
9. (Italy) Andrea Pellegrino (first round)

== Draw ==
Key

- Q = Qualifier
- WC = Wild card
- LL = Lucky loser
- Alt = Alternate
- ITF = ITF entry
- PR = Protected ranking
- SR = Special ranking
- SE = Special exempt
- JE = Junior exempt
- JR = Junior Accelerator Programme entrant
- CO = College Accelerator Programme entrant
- NG = Next Gen Accelerator Program entrant
- w/o = Walkover
- r = Retired
- d = Defaulted

=== Finals ===
Semifinals
(Belgium) Raphaël Collignon	6^{2}	6	6
LL	(Denmark) Elmer Møller	7^{7}	2	4
(United States) Emilio Nava	6^{3}	0
7	(Switzerland) Alexander Ritschard	7^{7}	6

Final
(Belgium) Raphaël Collignon	3	7^{7}	3
7	(Switzerland) Alexander Ritschard	6	6^{3}	6

=== Top half ===
First round
LL	(Austria) S Kopp	3	3
(Croatia) M Dodig	6	6
Q	(Spain) D Rincón	6^{2}	4
(Hungary) Z Piros	7^{7}	6
(Belgium) R Collignon	7	6
WC	(Portugal) G Elias	5	3
Q	(Slovakia) M Kližan	3	6^{6}
5	(Slovakia) J Kovalík	6	7^{8}
4	(Argentina) TA Tirante	6	7^{7}
Q	(Italy) E Dalla Valle	4	6^{4}
WC	(Portugal) F Ferreira Silva	4	6	6
(Kazakhstan) T Skatov	6	2	2
(Spain) O Roca Batalla	7	6
(Portugal) J Faria	5	2
LL	(Denmark) E Møller	6	6
9	(Italy) A Pellegrino	3	1

Second round
(Croatia) M Dodig	6	2	1
(Hungary) Z Piros	3	6	6
(Belgium) R Collignon	6	6
5	(Slovakia) J Kovalík	3	3
4	(Argentina) TA Tirante	6	6
WC	(Portugal) F Ferreira Silva	3	1
(Spain) O Roca Batalla	3	0^{r}
LL	(Denmark) E Møller	6	1

Quarterfinals
(Hungary) Z Piros	1	0
(Belgium) R Collignon	6	6
4	(Argentina) TA Tirante	4	6	3
LL	(Denmark) E Møller	6	4	6

Semifinals
(Belgium) R Collignon	6^{2}	6	6
LL	(Denmark) E Møller	7^{7}	2	4

=== Bottom half ===
First round
8	(Colombia) DE Galán	6^{2}	6	6^{4}
Q	(Italy) G Fonio	7^{7}	4	7^{7}
(United States) E Nava	6	6
(Lithuania) V Gaubas	4	3
Alt	(Italy) F Arnaboldi	7^{7}	6
WC	(Portugal) D Vale	6^{5}	1
(Portugal) H Rocha	7^{7}	6
3	(Brazil) T Seyboth Wild	6^{4}	3
7	(Switzerland) A Ritschard	7	4	6
(France) A Géa	5	6	4
Q	(Austria) D Novak	6^{4}	6	3
SE	(France) L Pavlovic	7^{7}	3	6
LL	(Bulgaria) A Andreev	6	3	4
Q	(France) C Tabur	3	6	6
(Chile) T Barrios Vera	4	6	7^{7}
2	(Germany) D Altmaier	6	4	6^{5}

Second round
Q	(Italy) G Fonio	3	3
(United States) E Nava	6	6
Alt	(Italy) F Arnaboldi	2	6	0
(Portugal) H Rocha	6	2	6
7	(Switzerland) A Ritschard	6	6
SE	(France) L Pavlovic	1	1
Q	(France) C Tabur	3	2
(Chile) T Barrios Vera	6	6

Quarterfinals
(United States) E Nava	6	6
(Portugal) H Rocha	1	2
7	(Switzerland) A Ritschard	6	4	6
(Chile) T Barrios Vera	3	6	2

Semifinals
(United States) E Nava	6^{3}	0
7	(Switzerland) A Ritschard	7^{7}	6
