= 2019 Lisboa Belém Open =

- Date: 13–19 May
- Edition: 3rd
- Surface: Clay
- Location: Lisbon, Portugal

Champions

Singles
- (Spain) Roberto Carballés Baena

Doubles
- (Austria) Philipp Oswald / (Slovakia) Filip Polášek
← 2018 ·	Lisboa Belém Open	· 2020 →

The 2019 Lisboa Belém Open was a professional tennis tournament played on clay courts. It was the third edition of the tournament which was part of the 2019 ATP Challenger Tour. It took place in Lisbon, Portugal between 13 and 19 May 2019.

== Singles main-draw entrants ==
=== Seeds ===
Country	Player	Rank^{1}	Seed
FRA	Adrian Mannarino	56	1
ESP	Roberto Carballés Baena	91	2
ARG	Guido Andreozzi	92	3
~~POR~~	~~Pedro Sousa~~	~~105~~	~~4~~
AUS	Alexei Popyrin	111	5
USA	Bjorn Fratangelo	141	6
ESP	Pedro Martínez	146	7
AUS	James Duckworth	154	8
USA	Marcos Giron	157	9
ARG	Facundo Bagnis	159	10
ITA	Lorenzo Giustino	161	11
ITA	Alessandro Giannessi	164	12
USA	Mitchell Krueger	170	13
ESP	Enrique López Pérez	172	14
POR	João Domingues	185	15
AUS	Marc Polmans	188	16

- ^{1} Rankings are as of 6 May 2019.

=== Other entrants ===
The following players received wildcards into the singles main draw:

- (Portugal) Tiago Cação
- (Spain) Roberto Carballés Baena
- (Portugal) Gastão Elias
- (Portugal) Frederico Ferreira Silva
- (France) Adrian Mannarino

The following players received entry into the singles main draw using their ITF World Tennis Ranking:

- (Spain) Javier Barranco Cosano
- (Italy) Riccardo Bonadio
- (Italy) Raúl Brancaccio
- (Switzerland) Sandro Ehrat
- (France) Grégoire Jacq

The following players received entry from the qualifying draw:

- (Canada) Steven Diez
- (Spain) Nicola Kuhn

The following player received entry as a lucky loser:

- (Portugal) Luís Faria

== Champions ==
=== Singles ===
- (Spain) Roberto Carballés Baena def. (Argentina) Facundo Bagnis 2–6, 7–6^{(7–5)}, 6–1.

=== Doubles ===
- (Austria) Philipp Oswald / (Slovakia) Filip Polášek def. (Argentina) Guido Andreozzi / (Argentina) Guillermo Durán 7–5, 6–2.
