= 2018 Lisboa Belém Open =

- Date: 14–20 May
- Edition: 2nd
- Surface: Clay
- Location: Lisbon, Portugal

Champions

Singles
- (Spain) Tommy Robredo

Doubles
- (El Salvador) Marcelo Arévalo / (Mexico) Miguel Ángel Reyes-Varela
← 2017 ·	Lisboa Belém Open	· 2019 →

The 2018 Lisboa Belém Open was a professional tennis tournament played on clay courts. It was the second edition of the tournament which was part of the 2018 ATP Challenger Tour. It took place in Lisbon, Portugal between 14 and 20 May 2018.

== Singles main-draw entrants ==
=== Seeds ===
Country	Player	Rank^{1}	Seed
JPN	Taro Daniel	82	1
AUS	Alex de Minaur	109	2
~~POR~~	~~Gastão Elias~~	~~112~~	~~3~~
POR	Pedro Sousa	144	4
ESA	Marcelo Arévalo	147	5
AUT	Sebastian Ofner	148	6
GBR	Liam Broady	163	7
ESP	Jaume Munar	164	8

- ^{1} Rankings are as of 7 May 2018.

=== Other entrants ===
The following players received wildcards into the singles main draw:

- (Portugal) Tiago Cação
- (Japan) Taro Daniel
- (Portugal) Fred Gil
- (Portugal) João Monteiro

The following players received entry from the qualifying draw:

- (Spain) Alejandro Davidovich Fokina
- (Belgium) Joris De Loore
- (Italy) Edoardo Eremin
- (Argentina) Juan Pablo Ficovich

The following player received entry as a lucky loser:

- (Italy) Federico Gaio

== Champions ==
=== Singles ===
- (Spain) Tommy Robredo def. (Chile) Christian Garín 3–6, 6–3, 6–2.

=== Doubles ===
- (El Salvador) Marcelo Arévalo / (Mexico) Miguel Ángel Reyes-Varela def. (Poland) Tomasz Bednarek / (United States) Hunter Reese 6–3, 3–6, [10–1].
