= 2021 Lisboa Belém Open – Men's doubles =

Tennis Tournament

Men's doubles
- 2021 Lisboa Belém Open

Final
- Champions: (India) Jeevan Nedunchezhiyan (India) Purav Raja
- Runners-up: (Portugal) Nuno Borges (Portugal) Francisco Cabral
- Score: 7–6^{(7–5)}, 6–3

Events
Singles	men	women
Doubles	men	women
- Lisboa Belém Open

Roberto Cid Subervi and Gonçalo Oliveira were the defending champions but only Oliveira chose to defend his title, partnering Andrej Martin. Oliveira withdrew before the start of the tournament due to an injury.

Jeevan Nedunchezhiyan and Purav Raja won the title after defeating Nuno Borges and Francisco Cabral 7–6^{(7–5)}, 6–3 in the final.

== Seeds ==
1. (India) Jeevan Nedunchezhiyan / (India) Purav Raja (champions)
2. (Italy) Marco Bortolotti / (Italy) Andrea Pellegrino (quarterfinals)
3. (Slovakia) Andrej Martin / (Portugal) Gonçalo Oliveira (withdrew)
4. (France) Sadio Doumbia / (France) Hugo Gaston (withdrew)

== Draw ==
Key

- Q = Qualifier
- WC = Wild card
- LL = Lucky loser
- Alt = Alternate
- ITF = ITF entry
- PR = Protected ranking
- SR = Special ranking
- SE = Special exempt
- JE = Junior exempt
- JR = Junior Accelerator Programme entrant
- CO = College Accelerator Programme entrant
- NG = Next Gen Accelerator Program entrant
- w/o = Walkover
- r = Retired
- d = Defaulted

First round
1	(India) J Nedunchezhiyan (India) P Raja	6	6
WC	(Portugal) T Cação (Portugal) Gonçalo Falcão	3	2
(Mexico) L Patiño (Argentina) S Rodríguez Taverna	4	3
(Italy) F Forti (Italy) G Zeppieri	6	6
WC	(Portugal) J Faria (Portugal) Luís Faria	6	6
(Netherlands) I Sijsling (Netherlands) G Smits	4	3
WC	(Portugal) Miguel Gomes (Portugal) H Rocha	3	3
(Portugal) N Borges (Portugal) F Cabral	6	6
(Belgium) M Geerts (Netherlands) M Vervoort	3	2
Alt	(Germany) S Fanselow (Germany) Lucas Gerch	6	6
(France) T Lamasine (France) A Müller	6^{11}	2
(Germany) F Fallert (Germany) Peter Heller	7^{13}	6
(Russia) B Bobrov (Japan) K Uchida	6^{4}	4
2	(Italy) M Bortolotti (Italy) A Pellegrino	7^{7}	6

Quarterfinals
1	(India) J Nedunchezhiyan (India) P Raja	6	6
(Italy) F Forti (Italy) G Zeppieri	3	4
WC	(Portugal) J Faria (Portugal) L Faria
(Portugal) N Borges (Portugal) F Cabral	6	6
Alt	(Germany) S Fanselow (Germany) L Gerch	4	4
(Germany) F Fallert (Germany) P Heller	6	6
2	(Italy) M Bortolotti (Italy) A Pellegrino	1	2

Semifinals
1	(India) J Nedunchezhiyan (India) P Raja	4	6	[10]
WC	(Portugal) J Faria (Portugal) L Faria	6	3	[5]
(Portugal) N Borges (Portugal) F Cabral	6	6
(Germany) F Fallert (Germany) P Heller	2	2

Final
1	(India) J Nedunchezhiyan (India) P Raja	7^{7}	6
(Portugal) N Borges (Portugal) F Cabral	6^{5}	3
