= 2024 Lisboa Belém Open – Women's doubles =

Women's doubles
- 2024 Lisboa Belém Open

Final
- Champions: (Portugal) Francisca Jorge (Portugal) Matilde Jorge
- Runners-up: (Spain) Yvonne Cavallé Reimers (Spain) Ángela Fita Boluda
- Score: 7–6^{(7–5)}, 6–4

Events
| Singles | men | women |
| Doubles | men | women |
| ← 2023 · | Lisboa Belém Open | · 2025 → |

Andrea Gámiz and Eva Vedder were the defending champions but chose not to participate.

Francisca Jorge and Matilde Jorge won the title, defeating Yvonne Cavallé Reimers and Ángela Fita Boluda in the final, 7–6^{(7–5)}, 6–4.

== Seeds ==
1. (Czech Republic) Anastasia Dețiuc / (France) Elixane Lechemia (quarterfinals)
2. (Portugal) Francisca Jorge / (Portugal) Matilde Jorge (champions)
3. (Czech Republic) Jesika Malečková / (Czech Republic) Miriam Škoch (first round)
4. (France) Estelle Cascino / (France) Carole Monnet (first round)

== Draw ==
=== Key ===
- Q = Qualifier
- WC = Wild card
- LL = Lucky loser
- Alt = Alternate
- SE = Special exempt
- PR = Protected ranking
- ITF = ITF entry
- JE = Junior exempt
- w/o = Walkover
- r = Retired
- d = Defaulted
- SR = Special ranking

First round
1 | (Czech Republic) A Dețiuc (France) E Lechemia | 6 | 6
(Portugal) S Lança (Portugal) A Suciu | 1 | 1
(Portugal) T Franco Dias (Portugal) A Freitas | 2 | 2
(Spain) Y Cavallé Reimers (Spain) Á Fita Boluda | 6 | 6
4 | (France) E Cascino (France) C Monnet | 2 | 7 | [3]
(Mexico) M Portillo Ramírez (Netherlands) A Rus | 6 | 5 | [10]
(Algeria) I Ibbou (Switzerland) N Karamoko | 6 | 6
(Portugal) F Laúndes (Portugal) MdC Parreira | 1 | 0
(Latvia) D Marcinkēviča (Hungary) A Tóth
(Switzerland) Y In-Albon (Burundi) S Nahimana | w/o
(Greece) D Papamichail (Switzerland) S Waltert | 4 | 7^{7} | [10]
3 | (Czech Republic) J Malečková (Czech Republic) M Škoch | 6 | 6^{3} | [8]
(Portugal) L Couto (Portugal) M Pinto | 1 | 2
(Lithuania) I Dapkutė (Georgia (country)) S Shapatava | 6 | 6
(Germany) T Morderger (Germany) Y Morderger | 4 | 2
2 | (Portugal) F Jorge (Portugal) M Jorge | 6 | 6

Quarterfinals
1 | (Czech Republic) A Dețiuc (France) E Lechemia | 3 | 2
(Spain) Y Cavallé Reimers (Spain) Á Fita Boluda | 6 | 6
(Mexico) M Portillo Ramírez (Netherlands) A Rus | 2 | 6^{5}
(Algeria) I Ibbou (Switzerland) N Karamoko | 6 | 7^{7}
(Switzerland) Y In-Albon (Burundi) S Nahimana | 2 | 3
(Greece) D Papamichail (Switzerland) S Waltert | 6 | 6
(Lithuania) I Dapkutė (Georgia (country)) S Shapatava | 1 | 4
2 | (Portugal) F Jorge (Portugal) M Jorge | 6 | 6

Semifinals
(Spain) Y Cavallé Reimers (Spain) Á Fita Boluda | 6 | 6
(Algeria) I Ibbou (Switzerland) N Karamoko | 3 | 1
(Greece) D Papamichail (Switzerland) S Waltert | 1 | 5
2 | (Portugal) F Jorge (Portugal) M Jorge | 6 | 7

Final
(Spain) Y Cavallé Reimers (Spain) Á Fita Boluda | 6^{5} | 4
2 | (Portugal) F Jorge (Portugal) M Jorge | 7^{7} | 6
