= 2026 Lisboa Belém Open =

- Date: 12–18 October (women); 19–25 October (men)
- Edition: 10th (men); 6th (women)
- Category: ATP Challenger Tour 100; WTA 125
- Draw: 32S/16D
- Prize money: €160,680 (men) €100,000 (women)
- Surface: Clay / Outdoor
- Location: Lisbon, Portugal

Champions

Men's singles
- (Switzerland) Alexander Ritschard

Women's singles
- (France) Clara Burel

Men's doubles
- (Portugal) Tiago Pereira / (Spain) Benjamín Winter López

Women's doubles
- (Slovenia) Dalila Jakupović / (Slovenia) Nika Radišić
- Lisboa Belém Open

The 2026 Del Monte Lisboa Belém Open was a professional tennis tournament played on outdoor clay courts. It was the tenth edition of the men's tournament which was also part of the 2026 ATP Challenger Tour and sixth edition of the tournament for the women, which was also part of the 2026 WTA 125 Circuit, after being upgraded from ITF Women's World Tennis Tour. It took place at the Club Internacional de Foot-ball (CIF) in Lisbon, Portugal, between 12 and 25 October 2026.

== Men's singles main draw entrants ==
=== Seeds ===
Country	Player	Rank^{1}	Seed
ARG	Marco Trungelliti	90	1
POR	Henrique Rocha	106	2
~~HUN~~	~~Zsombor Piros~~	~~114~~	~~3~~
~~ESP~~	~~Pedro Martínez~~	~~130~~	~~4~~
ESP	Max Alcalá Gurri	138	5
LTU	Vilius Gaubas	141	6
ITA	Andrea Pellegrino	145	7
ESP	Nikolás Sánchez Izquierdo	157	8

- ^{1} Rankings are as of 5 October 2026.

=== Other entrants ===
The following players received wildcards into the singles main draw:

- (Portugal) Gastão Elias
- (Portugal) Diogo Morais
- (Portugal) Tiago Torres

The following players received entry into the singles main draw as alternates:

- (United States) Dali Blanch
- (Portugal) Tiago Pereira

The following players received entry from the qualifying draw:

- (Portugal) João Domingues
- (Lebanon) Benjamin Hassan
- (Switzerland) Alexander Ritschard
- (Spain) Alejo Sánchez Quílez
- (Switzerland) Patrick Schön
- (Spain) Carlos Taberner

The following players received entry as lucky losers:

- Svyatoslav Gulin
- (Slovakia) Andrej Martin

== Women's singles main draw entrants ==
=== Seeds ===
Country	Player	Rank	Seed
ESP	Jéssica Bouzas Maneiro	96	1
GBR	Francesca Jones	105	2
FRA	Fiona Ferro	108	3
LAT	Darja Semeņistaja	124	4
ESP	Guiomar Maristany	145	5
ESP	Leyre Romero Gormaz	146	6
HUN	Dalma Gálfi	150	7
ARG	Jazmín Ortenzi	158	8

- Rankings are as of 28 September 2026.

=== Other entrants ===
The following players received wildcards into the singles main draw:

- (Portugal) Beatriz Castro
- (Portugal) Analu Freitas
- (Portugal) Milana Ivantsiv
- (Portugal) Madalena Matias

The following players received entry from the qualifying draw:

- (Poland) Gina Feistel
- (France) Mathilde Lollia
- (Hungary) Adrienn Nagy
- (Cyprus) Raluca Șerban

=== Withdrawals ===
Before the tournament

- (Armenia) Elina Avanesyan → replaced by (North Macedonia) Lina Gjorcheska
- (Slovenia) Veronika Erjavec → replaced by (Italy) Martina Colmegna
- (France) Léolia Jeanjean → replaced by (France) Clara Burel

== Women's doubles entrants ==
=== Seeds ===
Country	Player	Country	Player	Rank	Seed
SLO	Dalila Jakupović	SLO	Nika Radišić	157	1
POR	Francisca Jorge	POR	Matilde Jorge	252	2
KAZ	Zhibek Kulambayeva	LAT	Darja Semeņistaja	304	3
AUS	Tenika McGiffin	HUN	Adrienn Nagy	355	4

- Rankings as of 5 October 2026.

=== Other entrants ===
The following pair received a wildcard into the doubles main draw:

- (Portugal) Beatriz Castro / (Portugal) Milana Ivantsiv

== Champions ==
=== Men's singles ===
- (Switzerland) Alexander Ritschard def. Svyatoslav Gulin 6–2, 6–1.

=== Women's singles ===
- (France) Clara Burel def. (Spain) Leyre Romero Gormaz 6–4, 6–3

=== Men's doubles ===
- (Portugal) Tiago Pereira / (Spain) Benjamín Winter López def. (Poland) Karol Drzewiecki / (Poland) Piotr Matuszewski 4–6, 6–3, [10–5].

=== Women's doubles ===
- (Slovenia) Dalila Jakupović / (Slovenia) Nika Radišić def. (Poland) Gina Feistel / (Cyprus) Raluca Șerban 6–3, 6–1
