= 2023 Lisboa Belém Open – Men's doubles =

Men's doubles
- 2023 Lisboa Belém Open

Final
- Champions: (Poland) Karol Drzewiecki (Czech Republic) Zdeněk Kolář
- Runners-up: (Portugal) Jaime Faria (Portugal) Henrique Rocha
- Score: 6–2, 7–6^{(7–5)}

Events
Singles	men	women
Doubles	men	women
- Lisboa Belém Open

Zdeněk Kolář and Gonçalo Oliveira were the defending champions but only Kolář chose to defend his title, partnering Karol Drzewiecki. Kolář successfully defended his title after defeating Jaime Faria and Henrique Rocha 6–2, 7–6^{(7–5)} in the final.

== Seeds ==
1. (France) Théo Arribagé / (France) Luca Sanchez (first round)
2. (Poland) Karol Drzewiecki / (Czech Republic) Zdeněk Kolář (champions)
3. (Serbia) Ivan Sabanov / (Serbia) Matej Sabanov (semifinals)
4. (Italy) Marco Bortolotti / (Romania) Alexandru Jecan (quarterfinals)

== Draw ==
Key

- Q = Qualifier
- WC = Wild card
- LL = Lucky loser
- Alt = Alternate
- ITF = ITF entry
- PR = Protected ranking
- SR = Special ranking
- SE = Special exempt
- JE = Junior exempt
- JR = Junior Accelerator Programme entrant
- CO = College Accelerator Programme entrant
- NG = Next Gen Accelerator Program entrant
- w/o = Walkover
- r = Retired
- d = Defaulted

First round
1	(France) T Arribagé (France) L Sanchez	6^{3}	4
(United Kingdom) S Duncan (United Kingdom) M Willis	7^{7}	6
(Sweden) F Bergevi (Netherlands) M Veldheer	1	6	[7]
(Spain) O Roca Batalla (Germany) Timo Stodder	6	2	[10]
4	(Italy) M Bortolotti (Romania) A Jecan	6	6
(Portugal) G Elias (Portugal) P Sousa	3	4
(Portugal) J Faria (Portugal) H Rocha	6	6
(India) Parikshit Somani (United Kingdom) C Thomson	4	0
WC	(Portugal) J Domingues (Portugal) Gonçalo Falcão	0	7^{7}	[8]
3	(Serbia) I Sabanov (Serbia) M Sabanov	6	6^{4}	[10]
(Portugal) T Pereira (Portugal) D Vale	6^{4}	7	[7]
(Lebanon) B Hassan (Germany) H Squire	7^{7}	5	[10]
(Italy) E Dalla Valle (Italy) F Forti	1	2
2	(Poland) K Drzewiecki (Czech Republic) Z Kolář	6	6

Quarterfinals
(United Kingdom) S Duncan (United Kingdom) M Willis	3	4
(Spain) O Roca Batalla (Germany) T Stodder	6	6
4	(Italy) M Bortolotti (Romania) A Jecan	3	2
(Portugal) J Faria (Portugal) H Rocha	6	6
WC	(Portugal) Pedro Araújo (Portugal) Fábio Coelho	1	3
3	(Serbia) I Sabanov (Serbia) M Sabanov	6	6
(Lebanon) B Hassan (Germany) H Squire
2	(Poland) K Drzewiecki (Czech Republic) Z Kolář	w/o

Semifinals
(Spain) O Roca Batalla (Germany) T Stodder	4	4
(Portugal) J Faria (Portugal) H Rocha	6	6
3	(Serbia) I Sabanov (Serbia) M Sabanov	4	4
2	(Poland) K Drzewiecki (Czech Republic) Z Kolář	6	6

Final
(Portugal) J Faria (Portugal) H Rocha	2	6^{5}
2	(Poland) K Drzewiecki (Czech Republic) Z Kolář	6	7^{7}
