= 2020 Lisboa Belém Open – Singles =

Singles
- 2020 Lisboa Belém Open

Final
- Champion: (Spain) Jaume Munar
- Runner-up: (Portugal) Pedro Sousa
- Score: 7–6^{(7–3)}, 6–2

Events
Singles	Doubles
- Lisboa Belém Open

Roberto Carballés Baena was the defending champion but chose not to defend his title.

Jaume Munar won the title after defeating Pedro Sousa 7–6^{(7–3)}, 6–2 in the final.

== Seeds ==
1. (Spain) Jaume Munar (champion)
2. (Portugal) Pedro Sousa (final)
3. (Bosnia and Herzegovina) Damir Džumhur (first round)
4. (Italy) Paolo Lorenzi (second round)
5. (Italy) Federico Gaio (semifinals)
6. (Netherlands) Tallon Griekspoor (second round, retired)
7. (Slovenia) Blaž Rola (first round)
8. (Portugal) João Domingues (first round)

== Draw ==
Key

- Q = Qualifier
- WC = Wild card
- LL = Lucky loser
- Alt = Alternate
- ITF = ITF entry
- PR = Protected ranking
- SR = Special ranking
- SE = Special exempt
- JE = Junior exempt
- JR = Junior Accelerator Programme entrant
- CO = College Accelerator Programme entrant
- NG = Next Gen Accelerator Program entrant
- w/o = Walkover
- r = Retired
- d = Defaulted

=== Finals ===
Semifinals
1	(Spain) Jaume Munar	6	6
5	(Italy) Federico Gaio	3	0
(Italy) Alessandro Giannessi	4	4
2	(Portugal) Pedro Sousa	6	6

Final
1	(Spain) Jaume Munar	7^{7}	6
2	(Portugal) Pedro Sousa	6^{3}	2

=== Top half ===
First round
1	(Spain) J Munar	6	6
Q	(Austria) S Ofner	4	2
(France) Q Halys	2	4
Q	(Croatia) B Gojo	6	6
(United Kingdom) J Clarke	1	6	3
(France) A Müller	6	3	6
(France) C Lestienne	5	6	3
6	(Netherlands) T Griekspoor	7	2	6
3/SE	(Bosnia and Herzegovina) D Džumhur	6^{8}	1
WC	(Portugal) N Borges	7^{10}	6
(France) M Janvier	6^{8}	2
Q	(Brazil) G Clezar	7^{10}	6
(France) E Benchetrit	6	7^{9}
(Argentina) R Olivo	3	6^{7}
(Czech Republic) Z Kolář	3	3
5	(Italy) F Gaio	6	6

Second round
1	(Spain) J Munar	6	7^{7}
Q	(Croatia) B Gojo	1	6^{5}
(France) A Müller	6	0
6	(Netherlands) T Griekspoor	1	1^{r}
WC	(Portugal) N Borges	3	6^{5}
Q	(Brazil) G Clezar	6	7^{7}
(France) E Benchetrit	4	5
5	(Italy) F Gaio	6	7

Quarterfinals
1	(Spain) J Munar	6	6
(France) A Müller	2	2
Q	(Brazil) G Clezar	7	4	6^{4}
5	(Italy) F Gaio	5	6	7^{7}

Semifinals
1	(Spain) J Munar	6	6
5	(Italy) F Gaio	3	0

=== Bottom half ===
First round
8	(Portugal) J Domingues	3	0
(France) B Bonzi	6	6
(Portugal) F Ferreira Silva	5	3
Q	(Bulgaria) D Kuzmanov	7	6
(Italy) A Giannessi	6	5	6
(Dominican Republic) R Cid Subervi	3	7	2
(United States) U Blanch	2	3
4	(Italy) P Lorenzi	6	6
7	(Slovenia) B Rola	6	6^{2}	5
WC	(Portugal) G Oliveira	1	7^{7}	7
(Brazil) J Menezes	3	4
(Kazakhstan) D Popko	6	6
(France) H Grenier	5	6	6
(France) M Bourgue	7	0	1
WC	(Portugal) G Elias	7^{7}	1	3
2	(Portugal) P Sousa	6^{5}	6	6

Second round
(France) B Bonzi	5	2
Q	(Bulgaria) D Kuzmanov	7	6
(Italy) A Giannessi	7	6
4	(Italy) P Lorenzi	5	3
WC	(Portugal) G Oliveira	2	2
(Kazakhstan) D Popko	6	6
(France) H Grenier	5	0
2	(Portugal) P Sousa	7	6

Quarterfinals
Q	(Bulgaria) D Kuzmanov	4	3
(Italy) A Giannessi	6	6
(Kazakhstan) D Popko	5	2
2	(Portugal) P Sousa	7	6

Semifinals
(Italy) A Giannessi	4	4
2	(Portugal) P Sousa	6	6
