= 2026 Lisboa Belém Open – Women's singles =

Women's singles
- 2026 Lisboa Belém Open

Final
- Champion: (France) Clara Burel
- Runner-up: (Spain) Leyre Romero Gormaz
- Score: 6–4, 6–3

Details
- Draw: 32 (4Q / 4WC)
- Seeds: 8

Events
Singles	men	women
Doubles	men	women
- Lisboa Belém Open

Clara Burel won the title, defeating Leyre Romero Gormaz 6–4, 6–3 in the final.

Simona Waltert was the reigning champion, but chose not to compete.

== Seeds ==
1. (Spain) Jéssica Bouzas Maneiro (semifinals)
2. (United Kingdom) Francesca Jones (quarterfinals)
3. (France) Fiona Ferro (quarterfinals)
4. (Latvia) Darja Semeņistaja (first round)
5. (Spain) Guiomar Maristany (quarterfinals)
6. (Spain) Leyre Romero Gormaz (final)
7. (Hungary) Dalma Gálfi (semifinals)
8. (Argentina) Jazmín Ortenzi (second round)

== Draw ==
Key

- Q = Qualifier
- WC = Wild card
- LL = Lucky loser
- Alt = Alternate
- ITF = ITF entry
- PR = Protected ranking
- SR = Special ranking
- SE = Special exempt
- JE = Junior exempt
- JR = Junior Accelerator Programme entrant
- CO = College Accelerator Programme entrant
- NG = Next Gen Accelerator Program entrant
- w/o = Walkover
- r = Retired
- d = Defaulted

=== Finals ===
Semifinals
1	(Spain) Jéssica Bouzas Maneiro	4	4
(France) Clara Burel	6	6
6	(Spain) Leyre Romero Gormaz	6	6
7	(Hungary) Dalma Gálfi	2	3

Final
(France) Clara Burel	6	6
6	(Spain) Leyre Romero Gormaz	4	3

=== Top half ===
First round
1	(Spain) J Bouzas Maneiro	6	6
WC	(Portugal) M Ivantsiv	2	1
(Spain) I Burillo	6	6
(Slovakia) V Morvayová	0	3
WC	(Portugal) M Matias	0	0
(Slovenia) P Hercog	6	6
(Czech Republic) B Palicová	4	6^{1}
8	(Argentina) J Ortenzi	6	7^{7}
4	(Latvia) D Semeņistaja	6^{5}	7	2
Q	(France) M Lollia	7^{7}	5	6
(France) C Burel	6	6
(North Macedonia) L Gjorcheska	1	3
(Greece) M Matoula	6	6
(Italy) G Pedone	3	4
Q	(Poland) G Feistel	2	3
5	(Spain) G Maristany	6	6

Second round
1	(Spain) J Bouzas Maneiro	6	3	7
(Spain) I Burillo	3	6	5
(Slovenia) P Hercog	6	3	6
8	(Argentina) J Ortenzi	3	6	3
Q	(France) M Lollia	0	1
(France) C Burel	6	6
(Greece) M Matoula	0	6^{4}
5	(Spain) G Maristany	6	7^{7}

Quarterfinals
1	(Spain) J Bouzas Maneiro	4	6	6
(Slovenia) P Hercog	6	1	4
(France) C Burel	6	6
5	(Spain) G Maristany	4	4

Semifinals
1	(Spain) J Bouzas Maneiro	4	4
(France) C Burel	6	6

=== Bottom half ===
First round
6	(Spain) L Romero Gormaz	4	6	7
(France) A Ramé	6	2	5
WC	(Portugal) A Freitas	1	1
Q	(Cyprus) R Șerban	6	6
Q	(Hungary) A Nagy	3	4
(France) S Janicijevic	6	6
(Italy) A Zantedeschi	3	4
3	(France) F Ferro	6	6
7	(Hungary) D Gálfi	6	6
WC	(Portugal) B Castro	0	1
(Sweden) L Zaar	1	5
(Portugal) M Jorge	6	7
(Kazakhstan) Z Kulambayeva	6	2	3
(Portugal) F Jorge	4	6	6
(Italy) M Colmegna	5	1
2	(United Kingdom) F Jones	7	6

Second round
6	(Spain) L Romero Gormaz	6	6
Q	(Cyprus) R Șerban	1	2
(France) S Janicijevic	5	1
3	(France) F Ferro	7	6
7	(Hungary) D Gálfi	3	7^{12}	7
(Portugal) M Jorge	6	6^{10}	5
(Portugal) F Jorge	3	4
2	(United Kingdom) F Jones	6	6

Quarterfinals
6	(Spain) L Romero Gormaz	6	6
3	(France) F Ferro	2	2
7	(Hungary) D Gálfi	6	6
2	(United Kingdom) F Jones	2	4

Semifinals
6	(Spain) L Romero Gormaz	6	6
7	(Hungary) D Gálfi	2	3

== Qualifying ==
=== Seeds ===
1. (Poland) Gina Feistel (qualified)
2. (Portugal) Angelina Voloshchuk (first round)
3. (United Kingdom) Hannah Klugman (withdrew)
4. (Cyprus) Raluca Șerban (qualified)
5. (Netherlands) Loes Ebeling Koning (qualifying competition)
6. (Croatia) Tena Lukas (qualifying competition)
7. (Switzerland) Katerina Tsygourova (first round)
8. (Croatia) Iva Primorac Pavičić (qualifying competition)

=== Qualifiers ===
1. (Poland) Gina Feistel
2. (Hungary) Adrienn Nagy
3. (France) Mathilde Lollia
4. (Cyprus) Raluca Șerban

=== Draw ===
==== First qualifier ====
First round
1	(Poland) Gina Feistel	6	6
Elina Nepliy	3	3
WC	(Portugal) Ana Filipa Santos	2	2
6	(Croatia) Tena Lukas	6	6

Qualifying competition
1	(Poland) Gina Feistel	3	6	6
6	(Croatia) Tena Lukas	6	1	3

==== Second qualifier ====
First round
2	(Portugal) Angelina Voloshchuk	3	7^{7}	3
(Hungary) Adrienn Nagy	6	6^{2}	6
WC	(Portugal) Teresa Franco Dias	2	3
8	(Croatia) Iva Primorac Pavičić	6	6

Qualifying competition
(Hungary) Adrienn Nagy	6	6
8	(Croatia) Iva Primorac Pavičić	3	3

==== Third qualifier ====
First round
Alt	(France) Mathilde Lollia	3	6	6
(Spain) María Martínez Vaquero	6	4	2
(Slovenia) Pia Lovrič	5	5
5	(Netherlands) Loes Ebeling Koning	7	7

Qualifying competition
Alt	(France) Mathilde Lollia	7	4	7^{7}
5	(Netherlands) Loes Ebeling Koning	5	6	6^{2}

==== Fourth qualifier ====
First round
4	(Cyprus) Raluca Șerban	6	4	6
(Netherlands) Sarah van Emst	2	6	4
(France) Sara Cakarevic	4	6	6
7	(Switzerland) Katerina Tsygourova	6	3	4

Qualifying competition
4	(Cyprus) Raluca Șerban	7	6
(France) Sara Cakarevic	5	1
