= 2021 Lisboa Belém Open =

Tennis tournament

- Date: 27 September–3 October 2021
- Edition: 5th (men); 1st (women)
- Category: ATP Challenger Tour; ITF Women's World Tennis Tour
- Prize money: €44,820 (men) $25,000 (women)
- Surface: Clay
- Location: Lisbon, Portugal

Champions

Men's singles
- (Kazakhstan) Dmitry Popko

Women's singles
- (Spain) Irene Burillo Escorihuela

Men's doubles
- (India) Jeevan Nedunchezhiyan / (India) Purav Raja

Women's doubles
- (Spain) Yvonne Cavallé Reimers / (Spain) Ángela Fita Boluda
- Lisboa Belém Open

The 2021 Lisboa Belém Open was a professional tennis tournament played on outdoor clay courts. It was the fifth (men) and first (women) editions of the tournament which were part of the 2021 ATP Challenger Tour and the 2021 ITF Women's World Tennis Tour. It took place in Lisbon, Portugal between 27 September and 3 October 2021.

== Men's singles main-draw entrants ==
=== Seeds ===
Country	Player	Rank^{1}	Seed
BRA	Thiago Monteiro	90	1
JPN	Taro Daniel	111	2
FRA	Hugo Gaston	115	3
SVK	Andrej Martin	122	4
SRB	Nikola Milojević	148	5
GER	Cedrik-Marcel Stebe	170	6
~~ITA~~	~~Alessandro Giannessi~~	~~182~~	~~7~~
KAZ	Dmitry Popko	188	8

- ^{1} Rankings are as of 20 September 2021.

=== Other entrants ===
The following players received wildcards into the singles main draw:

- (Portugal) Pedro Araújo
- (Portugal) Tiago Cação
- (Portugal) Gonçalo Oliveira

The following player received entry into the singles main draw using a protected ranking:

- (Morocco) Elliot Benchetrit

The following players received entry from the qualifying draw:

- (Germany) Sebastian Fanselow
- (Germany) Benjamin Hassan
- (Poland) Daniel Michalski
- (Argentina) Santiago Rodríguez Taverna

The following player received entry as a lucky loser:

- (Italy) Jacopo Berrettini

== Women's singles main-draw entrants ==
=== Seeds ===
Country	Player	Rank^{1}	Seed
GER	Tatjana Maria	198	1
FRA	Diane Parry	200	2
ARG	Paula Ormaechea	220	3
AUS	Ellen Perez	227	4
BUL	Isabella Shinikova	235	5
ESP	Andrea Lázaro García	236	6
SRB	Natalija Stevanović	239	7
ESP	Irene Burillo Escorihuela	243	8

- ^{1} Rankings are as of 20 September 2021.

=== Other entrants ===
The following players received wildcards into the singles main draw:

- (Portugal) Carolina Azadinho
- (Portugal) Matilde Morais
- (Portugal) Sofia Pinto
- (Portugal) Ana Filipa Santos

The following players received entry from the qualifying draw:

- (Italy) Nuria Brancaccio
- (Spain) Ángela Fita Boluda
- (Italy) Nicole Fossa Huergo
- (Norway) Malene Helgø
- (South Korea) Ku Yeon-woo
- (Turkey) İpek Öz
- (Ukraine) Ganna Poznikhirenko
- (Romania) Andreea Prisăcariu

== Champions ==
=== Men's singles ===
- (Kazakhstan) Dmitry Popko def. (Italy) Andrea Pellegrino 6–2, 6–4.

=== Women's singles ===
- (Spain) Irene Burillo Escorihuela def. (Turkey) İpek Öz, 6–4, 6–0

=== Men's doubles ===
- (India) Jeevan Nedunchezhiyan / (India) Purav Raja def. (Portugal) Nuno Borges / (Portugal) Francisco Cabral 7–6^{(7–5)}, 6–3.

=== Women's doubles ===
- (Spain) Yvonne Cavallé Reimers / (Spain) Ángela Fita Boluda def. (Argentina) Paula Ormaechea / (Serbia) Natalija Stevanović, 3–6, 6–3, [10–4]
