= 2018 Lisboa Belém Open – Singles =

Singles
- 2018 Lisboa Belém Open

Final
- Champion: (Spain) Tommy Robredo
- Runner-up: (Chile) Cristian Garín
- Score: 3–6, 6–3, 6–2

Events
Singles	Doubles
- Lisboa Belém Open

Oscar Otte was the defending champion but chose not to defend his title.

Tommy Robredo won the title after defeating Cristian Garín 3–6, 6–3, 6–2 in the final.

== Seeds ==
1. (Japan) Taro Daniel (quarterfinals)
2. (Australia) Alex de Minaur (first round)
3. (Portugal) Gastão Elias (withdrew)
4. (Portugal) Pedro Sousa (semifinals)
5. (El Salvador) Marcelo Arévalo (first round)
6. (Austria) Sebastian Ofner (semifinals)
7. (United Kingdom) Liam Broady (second round)
8. (Spain) Jaume Munar (second round)

== Draw ==
Key

- Q = Qualifier
- WC = Wild card
- LL = Lucky loser
- Alt = Alternate
- ITF = ITF entry
- PR = Protected ranking
- SR = Special ranking
- SE = Special exempt
- JE = Junior exempt
- JR = Junior Accelerator Programme entrant
- CO = College Accelerator Programme entrant
- NG = Next Gen Accelerator Program entrant
- w/o = Walkover
- r = Retired
- d = Defaulted

=== Finals ===
Semifinals
(Chile) Cristian Garín	5	7	6
4	(Portugal) Pedro Sousa	7	5	4
6	(Austria) Sebastian Ofner	6	4	1
(Spain) Tommy Robredo	3	6	6

Final
(Chile) Cristian Garín	6	3	2
(Spain) Tommy Robredo	3	6	6

=== Top half ===
First round
1/WC	(Japan) T Daniel	7^{7}	7^{7}
WC	(Portugal) João Monteiro	6^{4}	6^{2}
Q	(Italy) Edoardo Eremin	5	6	4
(Czech Republic) L Rosol	7	3	6
Q	(Argentina) JP Ficovich	3	5
(Chile) C Garín	6	7
(Argentina) R Olivo	1	1^{r}
8	(Spain) J Munar	6	4
4	(Portugal) P Sousa	6	7
WC	(Portugal) F Gil	2	5
(Italy) L Giustino	7	1	7^{9}
Q	(Belgium) J De Loore	5	6	6^{7}
(Portugal) G Oliveira	3	5
(Canada) F Auger-Aliassime	6	7
(Portugal) J Domingues	6	6
5	(El Salvador) M Arévalo	2	2

Second round
1/WC	(Japan) T Daniel	6	3	7^{7}
(Czech Republic) L Rosol	1	6	6^{4}
(Chile) C Garín	6	7^{7}
8	(Spain) J Munar	4	6^{4}
4	(Portugal) P Sousa	6	6
(Italy) L Giustino	2	0
(Canada) F Auger-Aliassime	6	7
(Portugal) J Domingues	4	5

Quarterfinals
1/WC	(Japan) T Daniel	6	1	0
(Chile) C Garín	4	6	6
4	(Portugal) P Sousa	6	6
(Canada) F Auger-Aliassime	3	1

Semifinals
(Chile) C Garín	5	7	6
4	(Portugal) P Sousa	7	5	4

=== Bottom half ===
First round
6	(Austria) S Ofner	6	6
WC	(Portugal) T Cação	0	3
(United States) E King	3	0
(United States) M Krueger	6	6
(Serbia) M Kecmanović	6	7^{7}
(Brazil) T Bellucci	3	6^{4}
(Austria) D Novak	6^{5}	1
LL	(Italy) F Gaio	7^{7}	6
7	(United Kingdom) L Broady	7^{7}	6
(France) S Robert	6^{3}	4
(Spain) T Robredo	6	6
(Spain) R Ojeda Lara	2	2
(United States) C Harrison	6	6
(France) G Sakharov	0	4
Q	(Spain) A Davidovich Fokina	7^{7}	6
2	(Australia) A de Minaur	6^{5}	4

Second round
6	(Austria) S Ofner	6	6
(United States) M Krueger	3	4
(Serbia) M Kecmanović	6	6
LL	(Italy) F Gaio	4	2
7	(United Kingdom) L Broady	3	6	3
(Spain) T Robredo	6	4	6
(United States) C Harrison	5	7^{10}	6
Q	(Spain) A Davidovich Fokina	7	6^{8}	1

Quarterfinals
6	(Austria) S Ofner	6	7
(Serbia) M Kecmanović	4	5
(Spain) T Robredo	7	6
(United States) C Harrison	5	1

Semifinals
6	(Austria) S Ofner	6	4	1
(Spain) T Robredo	3	6	6
