= 2026 Lisboa Belém Open – Women's doubles =

Women's doubles
- 2026 Lisboa Belém Open

Final
- Champions: (Slovenia) Dalila Jakupović (Slovenia) Nika Radišić
- Runners-up: (Poland) Gina Feistel (Cyprus) Raluka Șerban
- Score: 6–3, 6–1

Events
Singles	men	women
Doubles	men	women
- Lisboa Belém Open

Dalila Jakupović and Nika Radišić won the title, after defeating Gina Feistel and Raluka Șerban 6–3, 6–1 in the final.

Matilde Jorge and Naïma Karamoko were the reigning champions but Karamoko did not participate this year. Jorge partnered with Francisca Jorge, but they lost in the semifinals to Feistel and Șerban.

== Seeds ==
1. (Slovenia) Dalila Jakupović / (Slovenia) Nika Radišić (champions)
2. (Portugal) Francisca Jorge / (Portugal) Matilde Jorge (semifinals)
3. (Kazakhstan) Zhibek Kulambayeva / (Latvia) Darja Semeņistaja (first round)
4. (Australia) Tenika McGiffin / (Hungary) Adrienn Nagy (first round)

== Draw ==
Key

- Q = Qualifier
- WC = Wild card
- LL = Lucky loser
- Alt = Alternate
- ITF = ITF entry
- PR = Protected ranking
- SR = Special ranking
- SE = Special exempt
- JE = Junior exempt
- JR = Junior Accelerator Programme entrant
- CO = College Accelerator Programme entrant
- NG = Next Gen Accelerator Program entrant
- w/o = Walkover
- r = Retired
- d = Defaulted

=== Draw ===
First round
1	(Slovenia) D Jakupović (Slovenia) N Radišić	6	7
E Nepliy (India) V Shinde	0	5
(Netherlands) S van Emst (Sweden) L Zaar	6	7^{7}
(Spain) C Cerviño Ruiz (Portugal) A Voloshchuk	0	6^{4}
4	(Australia) T McGiffin (Hungary) A Nagy	3	6	[6]
(France) S Cakarevic (Croatia) T Lukas	6	3	[10]
WC	(Portugal) B Castro (Portugal) M Ivantsiv	3	2
(Spain) I Burillo (Italy) A Zantedeschi	6	6
(Poland) G Feistel (Cyprus) R Șerban	6	6
(Portugal) C Tomai (India) S Vig	1	1
(Greece) M Matoula (Italy) G Pedone	6	0	[10]
3	(Kazakhstan) Z Kulambayeva (Latvia) D Semeņistaja	4	6	[7]
(Slovenia) P Lovrič (Croatia) I Primorac Pavičić	2	6^{6}
(Netherlands) L Ebeling Koning (Switzerland) K Tsygourova	6	7^{8}
(Italy) M Colmegna (China) M Liu	2	1
2	(Portugal) F Jorge (Portugal) M Jorge	6	6

Quarterfinals
1	(Slovenia) D Jakupović (Slovenia) N Radišić	6	4	[10]
(Netherlands) S van Emst (Sweden) L Zaar	3	6	[6]
(France) S Cakarevic (Croatia) T Lukas	4	2
(Spain) I Burillo (Italy) A Zantedeschi	6	6
(Poland) G Feistel (Cyprus) R Șerban	7^{7}	4	[10]
(Greece) M Matoula (Italy) G Pedone	6^{5}	6	[6]
(Netherlands) L Ebeling Koning (Switzerland) K Tsygourova	6^{5}	4
2	(Portugal) F Jorge (Portugal) M Jorge	7^{7}	6

Semifinals
1	(Slovenia) D Jakupović (Slovenia) N Radišić	4	6	[10]
(Spain) I Burillo (Italy) A Zantedeschi	6	4	[6]
(Poland) G Feistel (Cyprus) R Șerban	6	6
2	(Portugal) F Jorge (Portugal) M Jorge	2	1

Final
1	(Slovenia) D Jakupović (Slovenia) N Radišić	6	6
(Poland) G Feistel (Cyprus) R Șerban	3	1
