= 2023 Lisboa Belém Open =

- Date: 2–8 October
- Edition: 7th (men); 3rd (women)
- Category: ATP Challenger Tour; ITF Women's World Tennis Tour
- Surface: Clay
- Location: Lisbon, Portugal

Champions

Men's singles
- (Italy) Flavio Cobolli

Women's singles
- (Ukraine) Katarina Zavatska

Men's doubles
- (Poland) Karol Drzewiecki / (Czech Republic) Zdeněk Kolář

Women's doubles
- (Venezuela) Andrea Gámiz / (Netherlands) Eva Vedder
← 2022 ·	Lisboa Belém Open	· 2024 →

The 2023 Lisboa Belém Open was a professional tennis tournament played on outdoor clay courts. It was the seventh (men) and third (women) editions of the tournament which were part of the 2023 ATP Challenger Tour and the 2023 ITF Women's World Tennis Tour. It took place in Lisbon, Portugal between 2 and 8 October 2023. It was Pedro Sousa last professional event before he retired.

== Men's singles main draw entrants ==
=== Seeds ===
Country	Player	Rank^{1}	Seed
ESP	Albert Ramos Viñolas	95	1
ITA	Flavio Cobolli	122	2
KAZ	Timofey Skatov	130	3
ESP	Pablo Llamas Ruiz	139	4
	Ivan Gakhov	165	5
FRA	Titouan Droguet	170	6
CZE	Zdeněk Kolář	172	7
ITA	Matteo Gigante	185	8

- ^{1} Rankings are as of 25 September 2023.

=== Other entrants ===
The following players received wildcards into the singles main draw:

- (Portugal) Gastão Elias
- (Portugal) João Sousa
- (Portugal) Pedro Sousa

The following player received entry into the singles main draw as a special exempt:

- (Spain) Oriol Roca Batalla

The following players received entry from the qualifying draw:

- (Spain) Javier Barranco Cosano
- (Italy) Enrico Dalla Valle
- (Italy) Francesco Forti
- (Ukraine) Oleksii Krutykh
- (Croatia) Luka Mikrut
- (Italy) Alexander Weis

The following players received entry as lucky losers:

- (Switzerland) Henri Laaksonen
- (Portugal) Henrique Rocha

== Women's singles main draw entrants ==
=== Seeds ===
Country	Player	Rank^{1}	Seed
~~AUS~~	~~Astra Sharma~~	~~161~~	~~1~~
UKR	Katarina Zavatska	188	2
ROU	Irina Bara	193	3
TUR	İpek Öz	205	4
ESP	Carlota Martínez Círez	233	5
NED	Suzan Lamens	240	6
	Ekaterina Makarova	241	7
ESP	Irene Burillo Escorihuela	242	8

- ^{1} Rankings are as of 25 September 2023.

=== Other entrants ===
The following players received wildcards into the singles main draw:

- (United States) Baylen Brown
- (Portugal) Carolina Mesquita
- (Brazil) Giulia Pereira De Aguiar
- (Portugal) Carla Tomai

The following players received entry from the qualifying draw:

- (Romania) Ilinca Amariei
- (Spain) Claudia Hoste Ferrer
- (Slovenia) Živa Falkner
- (Spain) Andrea Lázaro García
- (Serbia) Katarina Jokić
- (Czech Republic) Aneta Kučmová
- (France) Yasmine Mansouri
- (Spain) Guiomar Maristany

The following players received entry as lucky losers:

- (France) Alice Ramé

== Champions ==
=== Men's singles ===
- (Italy) Flavio Cobolli def. (Lebanon) Benjamin Hassan 7–5, 7–5.

=== Women's singles ===
- (Ukraine) Katarina Zavatska def. (Bulgaria) Gergana Topalova 6–3, 2–6, 7–5.

=== Men's doubles ===
- (Poland) Karol Drzewiecki / (Czech Republic) Zdeněk Kolář def. (Portugal) Jaime Faria / (Portugal) Henrique Rocha 6–2, 7–6^{(7–5)}.

=== Women's doubles ===
- (Venezuela) Andrea Gámiz / (Netherlands) Eva Vedder def. (Germany) Tayisiya Morderger / (Germany) Yana Morderger 6–1, 6–2.
