= 2024 Lisboa Belém Open =

Tennis tournament

- Date: 23–29 September 2024
- Edition: 8th (men); 4th (women)
- Category: ATP Challenger Tour 100; ITF Women's World Tennis Tour
- Prize money: €120,950 (men) $60,000 (women)
- Surface: Clay / Outdoor
- Location: Lisbon, Portugal

Champions

Men's singles
- (Switzerland) Alexander Ritschard

Women's singles
- (Andorra) Victoria Jiménez Kasintseva

Men's doubles
- (Monaco) Romain Arneodo / (France) Théo Arribagé

Women's doubles
- (Portugal) Francisca Jorge / (Portugal) Matilde Jorge
- Lisboa Belém Open

The 2024 Lisboa Belém Open was a professional tennis tournament played on outdoor clay courts. It was the eighth and fourth editions (for men and women, respectively) of the tournament, which was part of the 2024 ATP Challenger Tour and the 2024 ITF Women's World Tennis Tour. It took place in Lisbon, Portugal, between 23 and 29 September 2024.

== Champions ==
=== Men's singles ===
- (Switzerland) Alexander Ritschard def. (Belgium) Raphaël Collignon 6–3, 6–7^{(3–7)}, 6–3.

=== Women's singles ===
- (Andorra) Victoria Jiménez Kasintseva def. (Spain) Guiomar Maristany, 6–4, 6–2.

=== Men's doubles ===
- (Monaco) Romain Arneodo / (France) Théo Arribagé def. (United States) George Goldhoff / (Brazil) Fernando Romboli 6–2, 6–3.

=== Women's doubles ===
- (Portugal) Francisca Jorge / (Portugal) Matilde Jorge def. (Spain) Yvonne Cavallé Reimers / (Spain) Ángela Fita Boluda, 7–6^{(7–5)}, 6–4

== Men's singles main draw entrants ==
=== Seeds ===
Country	Player	Rank^{1}	Seed
~~BRA~~	~~Thiago Monteiro~~	~~76~~	~~1~~
GER	Daniel Altmaier	83	2
BRA	Thiago Seyboth Wild	96	3
ARG	Thiago Agustín Tirante	99	4
SVK	Jozef Kovalík	117	5
~~SRB~~	~~Laslo Djere~~	~~119~~	~~6~~
SUI	Alexander Ritschard	123	7
COL	Daniel Elahi Galán	130	8
ITA	Andrea Pellegrino	144	9

- ^{1} Rankings are as of 16 September 2024.

=== Other entrants ===
The following players received wildcards into the singles main draw:

- (Portugal) Gastão Elias
- (Portugal) Frederico Ferreira Silva
- (Portugal) Duarte Vale

The following player received entry into the singles main draw as a special exempt:

- (France) Luka Pavlovic

The following player received entry into the singles main draw as an alternate:

- (Italy) Federico Arnaboldi

The following players received entry from the qualifying draw:

- (Italy) Enrico Dalla Valle
- (Italy) Giovanni Fonio
- (Slovakia) Martin Kližan
- (Austria) Dennis Novak
- (Spain) Daniel Rincón
- (France) Clément Tabur

The following players received entry as lucky losers:

- (Bulgaria) Adrian Andreev
- (Austria) Sandro Kopp
- (Denmark) Elmer Møller

== Women's singles main draw entrants ==
=== Seeds ===
Country	Player	Rank	Seed
NED	Arantxa Rus	84	1
SRB	Olga Danilović	104	2
FRA	Chloé Paquet	110	3
ESP	Marina Bassols Ribera	156	4
CRO	Lea Bošković	161	5
GBR	Francesca Jones	162	6
	Anastasia Zakharova	165	7
ESP	Leyre Romero Gormaz	173	8

- Rankings are as of 16 September 2024.

=== Other entrants ===
The following players received wildcards into the singles main draw:

- (Portugal) Teresa Franco Dias
- (Portugal) Sara Lança
- (Portugal) Francisca Laúndes
- (Portugal) Matilde do Canto Parreira

The following players received entry into the singles main draw using a special ranking:

- (Germany) Nastasja Schunk

The following players received entry from the qualifying draw:

- (Brazil) Gabriela Cé
- (Italy) Deborah Chiesa
- (Spain) Ángela Fita Boluda
- (Switzerland) Ylena In-Albon
- (Netherlands) Anouk Koevermans
- (Burundi) Sada Nahimana
- (Ukraine) Oleksandra Oliynykova
- (France) Alice Ramé

The following players received entry as a lucky loser:

- (Czech Republic) Jesika Malečková
