= 2022 Lisboa Belém Open =

Tennis tournament

- Date: 26 September–2 October
- Edition: 6th (men); 2nd (women)
- Category: ATP Challenger Tour; ITF Women's World Tennis Tour
- Surface: Clay
- Location: Lisbon, Portugal

Champions

Men's singles
- (Italy) Marco Cecchinato

Women's singles
- (France) Carole Monnet

Men's doubles
- (Czech Republic) Zdeněk Kolář / (Portugal) Gonçalo Oliveira

Women's doubles
- (Portugal) Francisca Jorge / (Portugal) Matilde Jorge
- Lisboa Belém Open

The 2022 Lisboa Belém Open was a professional tennis tournament played on outdoor clay courts. It was the sixth (men) and second (women) editions of the tournament which were part of the 2022 ATP Challenger Tour and the 2022 ITF Women's World Tennis Tour. It took place in Lisbon, Portugal between 26 September and 2 October 2022.

== Men's singles main draw entrants ==
=== Seeds ===
| Country | Player | Rank^{1} | Seed |
|---|---|---|---|
| ARG | Pedro Cachin | 57 | 1 |
| ESP | Carlos Taberner | 121 | 2 |
| ITA | Francesco Passaro | 127 | 3 |
| AUT | Filip Misolic | 145 | 4 |
| ITA | Marco Cecchinato | 147 | 5 |
| ITA | Franco Agamenone | 148 | 6 |
| FRA | Alexandre Müller | 149 | 7 |
| FRA | Manuel Guinard | 152 | 8 |

- ^{1} Rankings are as of 19 September 2022.

=== Other entrants ===
The following players received wildcards into the singles main draw:

- (Portugal) João Domingues
- (Portugal) Frederico Ferreira Silva
- (Portugal) Pedro Sousa

The following player received entry into the singles main draw as a special exempt:

- (United States) Nicolas Moreno de Alboran

The following players received entry into the singles main draw as alternates:

- (Kazakhstan) Timofey Skatov
- (Serbia) Miljan Zekić

The following players received entry from the qualifying draw:

- (Croatia) Duje Ajduković
- (Spain) Javier Barranco Cosano
- (Germany) Jeremy Jahn
- (Portugal) Gonçalo Oliveira
- (Spain) Oriol Roca Batalla
- (France) Luca Van Assche

The following player received entry as a lucky loser:

- (Poland) Daniel Michalski

== Women's singles main draw entrants ==
=== Seeds ===
| Country | Player | Rank^{1} | Seed |
|---|---|---|---|
| SUI | Joanne Züger | 170 | 1 |
| FRA | Séléna Janicijevic | 191 | 2 |
| ESP | Andrea Lázaro García | 232 | 3 |
| ESP | Irene Burillo Escorihuela | 258 | 4 |
| USA | Francesca Di Lorenzo | 261 | 5 |
| FRA | Carole Monnet | 264 | 6 |
| POR | Francisca Jorge | 302 | 7 |
| TUR | Çağla Büyükakçay | 310 | 8 |

- ^{1} Rankings are as of 19 September 2022.

=== Other entrants ===
The following players received wildcards into the singles main draw:

- (Portugal) Francisca Jorge
- (Portugal) Matilde Jorge
- (Portugal) Sara Lança
- (Portugal) Ana Filipa Santos

The following players received entry from the qualifying draw:

- (Italy) Enola Chiesa
- (Spain) Marta González Encinas
- Ksenia Laskutova
- (Italy) Giorgia Pinto
- (France) Caroline Roméo
- (Italy) Gaia Squarcialupi
- (Uzbekistan) Sevil Yuldasheva
- (Poland) Aleksandra Zuchańska

== Champions ==
=== Men's singles ===
- (Italy) Marco Cecchinato def. (France) Luca Van Assche 6–3, 6–3.

=== Women's singles ===
- (France) Carole Monnet def. (Switzerland) Joanne Züger 1–6, 6–3, 6–2

=== Men's doubles ===
- (Czech Republic) Zdeněk Kolář / (Portugal) Gonçalo Oliveira def. (Ukraine) Vladyslav Manafov / (Ukraine) Oleg Prihodko 6–1, 7–6^{(7–4)}.

=== Women's doubles ===
- (Portugal) Francisca Jorge / (Portugal) Matilde Jorge def. (Spain) Irene Burillo Escorihuela / (Spain) Andrea Lázaro García, 6–2, 6–2
