= 2017 Lisboa Belém Open =

- Date: 12–18 June
- Edition: 1st
- Surface: Clay
- Location: Lisbon, Portugal

Champions

Singles
- (Germany) Oscar Otte

Doubles
- (South Africa) Ruan Roelofse / (Indonesia) Christopher Rungkat
- Lisboa Belém Open

The 2017 Lisboa Belém Open was a professional tennis tournament played on clay courts. It was the first edition of the tournament which was part of the 2017 ATP Challenger Tour. It took place in Lisbon, Portugal between 12 and 18 June 2017.

== Singles main-draw entrants ==
=== Seeds ===
Country	Player	Rank^{1}	Seed
BIH	Damir Džumhur	96	1
CZE	Adam Pavlásek	97	2
JPN	Taro Daniel	102	3
COL	Santiago Giraldo	107	4
POR	Gastão Elias	108	5
ESP	Roberto Carballés Baena	134	6
POR	Pedro Sousa	155	7
ESP	Rubén Ramírez Hidalgo	168	8

- ^{1} Rankings are as of 29 May 2017.

=== Other entrants ===
The following players received wildcards into the singles main draw:

- (Portugal) Frederico Ferreira Silva
- (Portugal) André Gaspar Murta
- (Portugal) João Monteiro
- (Portugal) Gonçalo Oliveira

The following players received entry from the qualifying draw:

- (Romania) Dragoș Dima
- (Ecuador) Gonzalo Escobar
- (Poland) Hubert Hurkacz
- (Spain) Daniel Muñoz de la Nava

== Champions ==
=== Singles ===
- (Germany) Oscar Otte def. (Japan) Taro Daniel 4–6, 6–1, 6–3.

=== Doubles ===
- (South Africa) Ruan Roelofse / (Indonesia) Christopher Rungkat def. (Portugal) Fred Gil / (Portugal) Gonçalo Oliveira 7–6^{(9–7)}, 6–1.
