= 2020 Lisboa Belém Open =

- Date: 12–18 October
- Edition: 4th
- Surface: Clay
- Location: Lisbon, Portugal

Champions

Singles
- (Spain) Jaume Munar

Doubles
- (Dominican Republic) Roberto Cid Subervi / (Portugal) Gonçalo Oliveira
- Lisboa Belém Open

The 2020 Lisboa Belém Open was a professional tennis tournament played on clay courts. It was the fourth edition of the tournament which was part of the 2020 ATP Challenger Tour. It took place in Lisbon, Portugal between 12 and 18 October 2020.

== Singles main-draw entrants ==
=== Seeds ===
Country	Player	Rank^{1}	Seed
ESP	Jaume Munar	109	1
POR	Pedro Sousa	113	2
BIH	Damir Džumhur	114	3
ITA	Paolo Lorenzi	130	4
ITA	Federico Gaio	132	5
NED	Tallon Griekspoor	139	6
SLO	Blaž Rola	148	7
POR	João Domingues	161	8

- ^{1} Rankings are as of 28 September 2020.

=== Other entrants ===
The following players received wildcards into the singles main draw:

- (Portugal) Nuno Borges
- (Portugal) Gastão Elias
- (Portugal) Gonçalo Oliveira

The following player received entry into the singles main draw as a special exempt:

- (Bosnia and Herzegovina) Damir Džumhur

The following players received entry from the qualifying draw:

- (Brazil) Guilherme Clezar
- (Croatia) Borna Gojo
- (Bulgaria) Dimitar Kuzmanov
- (Austria) Sebastian Ofner

== Champions ==
=== Singles ===
- (Spain) Jaume Munar def. (Portugal) Pedro Sousa 7–6^{(7–3)}, 6–2.

=== Doubles ===
- (Dominican Republic) Roberto Cid Subervi / (Portugal) Gonçalo Oliveira def. (Finland) Harri Heliövaara / (Czech Republic) Zdeněk Kolář 7–6^{(7–5)}, 4–6, [10–4].
