= Lisboa Belém Open =

- 2026 Lisboa Belém Open

Tournament information
- Event name: Lisboa Belém Open
- Location: Lisbon, Portugal
- Venue: Club Internacional de Foot-ball
- Surface: Clay
- Website: website

Current champions (2026)
- Men's singles: (Lithuania) Vilius Gaubas
- Women's singles: (France) Clara Burel
- Men's doubles: (Spain) Pablo Llamas Ruiz (Spain) Sergio Martos Gornés
- Women's doubles: (Slovenia) Dalila Jakupović (Slovenia) Nika Radišić
ATP Tour
- Category: Challenger 100
- Draw: 32S/32Q/16D
- Prize money: €160,680 (2026)
WTA Tour
- Category: WTA 125
- Draw: 32S/16Q/16D
- Prize money: €100,000 (2026)

The Lisboa Belém Open is a tennis tournament played on clay courts. It is currently part of the ATP Challenger Tour and the WTA 125 Circuit. Until 2025, the tournament was a part of the ITF Women's World Tennis Tour for the women. It has been held in Lisbon, Portugal since 2017 (women since 2021).

== Past finals ==
=== Men's singles ===
Year	Champion	Runner-up	Score
2026	(Switzerland) Alexander Ritschard	Svyatoslav Gulin	6–2, 6–1
2025	(Lithuania) Vilius Gaubas	(Portugal) Henrique Rocha	6–7^{(3–7)}, 6–3, 6–4
2024	(Switzerland) Alexander Ritschard	(Belgium) Raphaël Collignon	6–3, 6–7^{(3–7)}, 6–3
2023	(Italy) Flavio Cobolli	(Lebanon) Benjamin Hassan	7–5, 7–5
2022	(Italy) Marco Cecchinato	(France) Luca Van Assche	6–3, 6–3
2021	(Kazakhstan) Dmitry Popko	(Italy) Andrea Pellegrino	6–2, 6–4
2020	(Spain) Jaume Munar	(Portugal) Pedro Sousa	7–6^{(7–3)}, 6–2
2019	(Spain) Roberto Carballés Baena	(Argentina) Facundo Bagnis	2–6, 7–6^{(7–5)}, 6–1
2018	(Spain) Tommy Robredo	(Chile) Christian Garín	3–6, 6–3, 6–2
2017	(Germany) Oscar Otte	(Japan) Taro Daniel	4–6, 6–1, 6–3

=== Women's singles ===
Year	Champion	Runner-up	Score
2026	(France) Clara Burel	(Spain) Leyre Romero Gormaz	6–4, 6–3
↑ WTA 125 event ↑
2025	(Switzerland) Simona Waltert	(Latvia) Darja Semeņistaja	6–2, 6–1
2024	(Andorra) Victoria Jiménez Kasintseva	(Spain) Guiomar Maristany	6–4, 6–2
2023	(Ukraine) Katarina Zavatska	(Bulgaria) Gergana Topalova	6–3, 2–6, 7–5
2022	(France) Carole Monnet	(Switzerland) Joanne Züger	1–6, 6–3, 6–2
2021	(Spain) Irene Burillo	(Turkey) İpek Öz	6–4, 6–0

=== Men's doubles ===
Year	Champions	Runners-up	Score
2026	(Portugal) Tiago Pereira (Spain) Benjamín Winter López	(Poland) Karol Drzewiecki (Poland) Piotr Matuszewski	4–6, 6–3, [10–5]
2025	(Spain) Pablo Llamas Ruiz (Spain) Sergio Martos Gornés	(Romania) Alexandru Jecan (Romania) Bogdan Pavel	7–6^{(7–5)}, 6–4
2024	(Monaco) Romain Arneodo (France) Théo Arribagé	(United States) George Goldhoff (Brazil) Fernando Romboli	6–2, 6–3
2023	(Poland) Karol Drzewiecki (Czech Republic) Zdeněk Kolář (2)	(Portugal) Jaime Faria (Portugal) Henrique Rocha	6–2, 7–6^{(7–5)}
2022	(Czech Republic) Zdeněk Kolář (Portugal) Gonçalo Oliveira (2)	(Ukraine) Vladyslav Manafov (Ukraine) Oleg Prihodko	6–1, 7–6^{(7–4)}
2021	(India) Jeevan Nedunchezhiyan (India) Purav Raja	(Portugal) Nuno Borges (Portugal) Francisco Cabral	7–6^{(7–5)}, 6–3
2020	(Dominican Republic) Roberto Cid Subervi (Portugal) Gonçalo Oliveira	(Finland) Harri Heliövaara (Czech Republic) Zdeněk Kolář	7–6^{(7–5)}, 4–6, [10–4]
2019	(Austria) Philipp Oswald (Slovakia) Filip Polášek	(Argentina) Guido Andreozzi (Argentina) Guillermo Durán	7–5, 6–2
2018	(El Salvador) Marcelo Arévalo (Mexico) Miguel Ángel Reyes-Varela	(Poland) Tomasz Bednarek (United States) Hunter Reese	6–3, 3–6, [10–1]
2017	(South Africa) Ruan Roelofse (Indonesia) Christopher Rungkat	(Portugal) Fred Gil (Portugal) Gonçalo Oliveira	7–6^{(9–7)}, 6–1

=== Women's doubles ===
Year	Champions	Runners-up	Score
2026	(Slovenia) Dalila Jakupović (Slovenia) Nika Radišić	(Poland) Gina Feistel (Cyprus) Raluca Șerban	6–3, 6–1
↑ WTA 125 event ↑
2025	(Portugal) Matilde Jorge (3) (Switzerland) Naïma Karamoko	(Slovenia) Dalila Jakupović (Slovenia) Nika Radišić	6–2, 6–3
2024	(Portugal) Francisca Jorge (2) (Portugal) Matilde Jorge (2)	(Spain) Yvonne Cavallé Reimers (Spain) Ángela Fita Boluda	7–6^{(7–5)}, 6–4
2023	(Venezuela) Andrea Gámiz (Netherlands) Eva Vedder	(Germany) Tayisiya Morderger (Germany) Yana Morderger	6–1, 6–2
2022	(Portugal) Francisca Jorge (Portugal) Matilde Jorge	(Spain) Irene Burillo (Spain) Andrea Lázaro García	6–2, 6–2
2021	(Spain) Yvonne Cavallé Reimers (Spain) Ángela Fita Boluda	(Argentina) Paula Ormaechea (Serbia) Natalija Stevanović	3–6, 6–3, [10–4]
