= 2026 CT Porto Cup – Singles =

Singles
- 2026 CT Porto Cup

Final
- Champion: (Argentina) Facundo Mena
- Runner-up: (Bolivia) Hugo Dellien
- Score: 7–6^{(7–4)}, 6–4

Events
Singles	Doubles
- CT Porto Cup

Guy den Ouden was the defending champion but chose not to defend his title.

Facundo Mena won the title after defeating Hugo Dellien 7–6^{(7–4)}, 6–4 in the final.

== Seeds ==
1. (Brazil) Gustavo Heide (semifinals)
2. (Bolivia) Hugo Dellien (final)
3. (Italy) Marco Cecchinato (second round)
4. (Czech Republic) Zdeněk Kolář (first round)
5. (Spain) Max Alcalá Gurri (second round)
6. (Belgium) Kimmer Coppejans (first round)
7. (Spain) Nikolás Sánchez Izquierdo (first round)
8. (Argentina) Genaro Alberto Olivieri (first round)

== Draw ==
Key

- Q = Qualifier
- WC = Wild card
- LL = Lucky loser
- Alt = Alternate
- ITF = ITF entry
- PR = Protected ranking
- SR = Special ranking
- SE = Special exempt
- JE = Junior exempt
- JR = Junior Accelerator Programme entrant
- CO = College Accelerator Programme entrant
- NG = Next Gen Accelerator Program entrant
- w/o = Walkover
- r = Retired
- d = Defaulted

=== Finals ===
Semifinals
1	(Brazil) Gustavo Heide	6^{5}	6	3
(Argentina) Facundo Mena	7^{7}	3	6
Q	(Spain) Pedro Vives Marcos	4	1
2	(Bolivia) Hugo Dellien	6	6

Final
(Argentina) Facundo Mena	7^{7}	6
2	(Bolivia) Hugo Dellien	6^{4}	4

=== Top half ===
First round
1	(Brazil) G Heide	6	6
WC	(Portugal) Gonçalo Marques	4	3
WC	(Portugal) Francisco Rocha	4	5
WC	(Portugal) T Pereira	6	7
NG	(Germany) Mika Petkovic	4	7	7
Alt	(Portugal) T Torres	6	5	5
(Brazil) T Monteiro	6	6
6	(Belgium) K Coppejans	4	2
4	(Czech Republic) Z Kolář	1	1
Alt	(Spain) O Roca Batalla	6	6
JR	(Germany) N McDonald	3	4
(Italy) E Dalla Valle	6	6
Q	(Switzerland) Patrick Schön	4	2
(Argentina) F Mena	6	6
(France) Sean Cuenin	6	4	0^{r}
5	(Spain) M Alcalá Gurri	4	6	3

Second round
1	(Brazil) G Heide	7	7
WC	(Portugal) T Pereira	5	5
NG	(Germany) M Petkovic	1	6	2
(Brazil) T Monteiro	6	4	6
Alt	(Spain) O Roca Batalla	7^{7}	6
(Italy) E Dalla Valle	6^{2}	2
(Argentina) F Mena	0	6	6
5	(Spain) M Alcalá Gurri	6	0	2

Quarterfinals
1	(Brazil) G Heide	6	6
(Brazil) T Monteiro	4	3
Alt	(Spain) O Roca Batalla	4	4
(Argentina) F Mena	6	6

Semifinals
1	(Brazil) G Heide	6^{5}	6	3
(Argentina) F Mena	7^{7}	3	6

=== Bottom half ===
First round
8	(Argentina) GA Olivieri	6^{3}	7^{8}	6^{2}
Q	(Netherlands) N Visker	7^{7}	6^{6}	7^{7}
Q	(Spain) P Vives Marcos	7^{7}	6
Q	(Brazil) E Ribeiro	6^{3}	4
Q	(Portugal) T Cação	6	1	4
(Spain) A Moro Cañas	3	6	6
(Dominican Republic) N Hardt	6	0	3
3	(Italy) M Cecchinato	4	6	6
7	(Spain) N Sánchez Izquierdo	5	6	5
(Spain) M Damas	7	1	7
Q	(Bulgaria) D Kuzmanov	6	1	6
LL	(United States) A Ayeni	2	6	3
(Belgium) GA Bailly	7^{7}	6
(Argentina) A Barrena	6^{3}	3
(Portugal) F Ferreira Silva	3	3
2	(Bolivia) H Dellien	6	6

Second round
Q	(Netherlands) N Visker	6	6^{1}	4
Q	(Spain) P Vives Marcos	4	7^{7}	6
(Spain) A Moro Cañas	6	6
3	(Italy) M Cecchinato	3	4
(Spain) M Damas	7	3	7^{7}
Q	(Bulgaria) D Kuzmanov	5	6	6^{3}
(Belgium) GA Bailly	4	0
2	(Bolivia) H Dellien	6	6

Quarterfinals
Q	(Spain) P Vives Marcos	6	5	7^{7}
(Spain) A Moro Cañas	3	7	6^{4}
(Spain) M Damas	2	4
2	(Bolivia) H Dellien	6	6

Semifinals
Q	(Spain) P Vives Marcos	4	1
2	(Bolivia) H Dellien	6	6
