= 2025 Clube Tenis Porto Challenger – Singles =

Singles
- 2025 Clube Tenis Porto Challenger

Final
- Champion: (Netherlands) Guy den Ouden
- Runner-up: (Belgium) Gilles-Arnaud Bailly
- Score: 6–4, 6–2

Events
Singles	Doubles
- Clube Tenis Porto Challenger

Adrian Andreev was the defending champion but chose not to defend his title.

Guy den Ouden won the title after defeating Gilles-Arnaud Bailly 6–4, 6–2 in the final.

== Seeds ==
1. (Brazil) Thiago Seyboth Wild (first round)
2. (Netherlands) Guy den Ouden (champion)
3. (Portugal) Henrique Rocha (first round)
4. (Argentina) Alex Barrena (second round)
5. (Sweden) Elias Ymer (first round)
6. (Kazakhstan) Dmitry Popko (first round)
7. (Argentina) Genaro Alberto Olivieri (second round)
8. (Portugal) Frederico Ferreira Silva (semifinals)

== Draw ==
Key

- Q = Qualifier
- WC = Wild card
- LL = Lucky loser
- Alt = Alternate
- ITF = ITF entry
- PR = Protected ranking
- SR = Special ranking
- SE = Special exempt
- JE = Junior exempt
- JR = Junior Accelerator Programme entrant
- CO = College Accelerator Programme entrant
- NG = Next Gen Accelerator Program entrant
- w/o = Walkover
- r = Retired
- d = Defaulted

=== Finals ===
Semifinals
(Spain) Alejandro Moro Cañas	4	6	3
NG	(Belgium) Gilles-Arnaud Bailly	6	1	6
8	(Portugal) Frederico Ferreira Silva	3	3
2	(Netherlands) Guy den Ouden	6	6

Final
NG	(Belgium) Gilles-Arnaud Bailly	4	2
2	(Netherlands) Guy den Ouden	6	6

=== Top half ===
First round
1	(Brazil) T Seyboth Wild	2	4
(Spain) N Sánchez Izquierdo	6	6
(Portugal) T Pereira	6	4	4
(Croatia) M Dodig	2	6	6
Q	(Sweden) O Wallin	3	4
(Spain) A Moro Cañas	6	6
Alt	(Mexico) A Hernández	4	2
7	(Argentina) GA Olivieri	6	6
4	(Argentina) A Barrena	6	6
(Germany) C Negritu	4	4
(Spain) N Álvarez Varona	6	6
Alt	(Latvia) R Strombachs	0	2
NG	(Belgium) G-A Bailly	6	6
Alt	(Czech Republic) M Mrva	1	2
WC	(Portugal) Pedro Araújo	5	6	7
5	(Sweden) E Ymer	7	4	5

Second round
(Spain) N Sánchez Izquierdo	6	6
(Croatia) M Dodig	3	2
(Spain) A Moro Cañas	7	2	6
7	(Argentina) GA Olivieri	5	6	1
4	(Argentina) A Barrena	4	4
(Spain) N Álvarez Varona	6	6
NG	(Belgium) G-A Bailly	6	6
WC	(Portugal) P Araújo	0	1

Quarterfinals
(Spain) N Sánchez Izquierdo	6^{6}	4
(Spain) A Moro Cañas	7^{8}	6
(Spain) N Álvarez Varona	2	6	4
NG	(Belgium) G-A Bailly	6	3	6

Semifinals
(Spain) A Moro Cañas	4	6	3
NG	(Belgium) G-A Bailly	6	1	6

=== Bottom half ===
First round
8	(Portugal) F Ferreira Silva	6	4	6
Q	(Spain) M Alcalá Gurri	3	6	2
Q	(Portugal) T Torres	6	1	6
(Czech Republic) H Bartoň	3	6	4
Q	(Spain) D Jordà Sanchis	6	6
Q	(Poland) F Pieczonka	2	1
(Switzerland) M Brunold	7^{7}	6
3/WC	(Portugal) H Rocha	6^{4}	0
6	(Kazakhstan) D Popko	3	4
(Bulgaria) D Kuzmanov	6	6
(Poland) D Michalski	6	7^{8}
(Spain) C Sánchez Jover	4	6^{6}
WC	(Portugal) Francisco Rocha	4
Q	(United States) Maxwell McKennon	2^{r}
(Croatia) M Poljičak	3	6	2
2	(Netherlands) G den Ouden	6	1	6

Second round
8	(Portugal) F Ferreira Silva	6	6
Q	(Portugal) T Torres	3	3
Q	(Spain) D Jordà Sanchis	6	3	6
(Switzerland) M Brunold	3	6	4
(Bulgaria) D Kuzmanov	6	5	5
(Poland) D Michalski	4	7	7
WC	(Portugal) F Rocha	3	4
2	(Netherlands) G den Ouden	6	6

Quarterfinals
8	(Portugal) F Ferreira Silva	7	6
Q	(Spain) D Jordà Sanchis	5	4
(Poland) D Michalski	6	4	4
2	(Netherlands) G den Ouden	4	6	6

Semifinals
8	(Portugal) F Ferreira Silva	3	3
2	(Netherlands) G den Ouden	6	6
