= 2024 Clube Tenis Porto Challenger – Doubles =

Doubles
- 2024 Clube Tenis Porto Challenger

Final
- Champions: (Israel) Daniel Cukierman (Poland) Piotr Matuszewski
- Runners-up: (Monaco) Romain Arneodo (France) Théo Arribagé
- Score: 6–4, 6–0

Events
Singles	Doubles
- Clube Tenis Porto Challenger

This was the first edition of the tournament.

Daniel Cukierman and Piotr Matuszewski won the title after defeating Romain Arneodo and Théo Arribagé 6–4, 6–0 in the final.

== Seeds ==
1. (Monaco) Romain Arneodo / (France) Théo Arribagé (final)
2. (Israel) Daniel Cukierman / (Poland) Piotr Matuszewski (champions)
3. (Spain) Íñigo Cervantes / (Spain) Oriol Roca Batalla (first round)
4. (Bulgaria) Alexander Donski / (Portugal) Tiago Pereira (first round)

== Draw ==
Key

- Q = Qualifier
- WC = Wild card
- LL = Lucky loser
- Alt = Alternate
- ITF = ITF entry
- PR = Protected ranking
- SR = Special ranking
- SE = Special exempt
- JE = Junior exempt
- JR = Junior Accelerator Programme entrant
- CO = College Accelerator Programme entrant
- NG = Next Gen Accelerator Program entrant
- w/o = Walkover
- r = Retired
- d = Defaulted

=== Draw ===
First round
1	(Monaco) R Arneodo (France) T Arribagé	6	7
WC	(Portugal) Pedro Araújo (Portugal) Diogo Marques	0	5
(Portugal) J Domingues (Portugal) F Ferreira Silva	6^{7}	6^{3}
WC	(Portugal) Rodrigo Cruz (Portugal) Francisco Rocha	7^{9}	7^{7}
4	(Bulgaria) A Donski (Portugal) T Pereira	2	4
(India) S Banthia (United States) Tennyson Whiting	6	6
(Germany) D Masur (Germany) M Möller	7	6
(Germany) S Fanselow (Brazil) P Sakamoto	5	1
(Netherlands) M Hermans (Spain) B Pujol Navarro	6	6
(United States) William Grant (Portugal) D Vale	3	2
(Italy) F Agamenone (Argentina) S Rodríguez Taverna	6	6^{1}	[10]
3	(Spain) Í Cervantes (Spain) O Roca Batalla	4	7^{7}	[2]
(Bulgaria) A Andreev (Spain) N Sánchez Izquierdo	5	6	[10]
(Spain) D Jordà Sanchis (Turkey) E Kırkın	7	3	[2]
(United Kingdom) James Davis (United Kingdom) S Duncan	3	6^{3}
2	(Israel) D Cukierman (Poland) P Matuszewski	6	7^{7}

Quarterfinals
1	(Monaco) R Arneodo (France) T Arribagé	6	6
WC	(Portugal) R Cruz (Portugal) F Rocha	2	1
(India) S Banthia (United States) T Whiting	3	6	[10]
(Germany) D Masur (Germany) M Möller	6	3	[7]
(Netherlands) M Hermans (Spain) B Pujol Navarro	4	2
(Italy) F Agamenone (Argentina) S Rodríguez Taverna	6	6
(Bulgaria) A Andreev (Spain) N Sánchez Izquierdo	2	3
2	(Israel) D Cukierman (Poland) P Matuszewski	6	6

Semifinals
1	(Monaco) R Arneodo (France) T Arribagé	6	7^{7}
(India) S Banthia (United States) T Whiting	2	6^{5}
(Italy) F Agamenone (Argentina) S Rodríguez Taverna	6^{5}	3
2	(Israel) D Cukierman (Poland) P Matuszewski	7^{7}	6

Final
1	(Monaco) R Arneodo (France) T Arribagé	4	0
2	(Israel) D Cukierman (Poland) P Matuszewski	6	6
