= 2026 CT Porto Cup =

- Date: 31 August – 6 September
- Edition: 3rd
- Surface: Clay
- Location: Porto, Portugal

Champions

Singles
- (Argentina) Facundo Mena

Doubles
- (Spain) Sergio Martos Gornés / (Poland) Szymon Walków
- CT Porto Cup

The 2026 CT Porto Cup was a professional tennis tournament played on clay courts. It was the third edition of the tournament which was part of the 2026 ATP Challenger Tour. It took place in Porto, Portugal between 31 August and 6 September 2026.

== Singles main-draw entrants ==
=== Seeds ===
Country	Player	Rank^{1}	Seed
BRA	Gustavo Heide	128	1
BOL	Hugo Dellien	140	2
ITA	Marco Cecchinato	166	3
CZE	Zdeněk Kolář	175	4
ESP	Max Alcalá Gurri	177	5
BEL	Kimmer Coppejans	216	6
ESP	Nikolás Sánchez Izquierdo	219	7
ARG	Genaro Alberto Olivieri	222	8

- ^{1} Rankings are as of 24 August 2026.

=== Other entrants ===
The following players received wildcards into the singles main draw:

- (Portugal) Gonçalo Marques
- (Portugal) Tiago Pereira
- (Portugal) Francisco Rocha

The following player received entry into the singles main draw through the Junior Accelerator programme:

- (Germany) Niels McDonald

The following player received entry into the singles main draw through the Next Gen Accelerator programme:

- (Germany) Mika Petkovic

The following players received entry into the singles main draw as alternates:

- (Spain) Oriol Roca Batalla
- (Portugal) Tiago Torres

The following players received entry from the qualifying draw:

- (Portugal) Tiago Cação
- (Bulgaria) Dimitar Kuzmanov
- (Brazil) Eduardo Ribeiro
- (Switzerland) Patrick Schön
- (Netherlands) Niels Visker
- (Spain) Pedro Vives Marcos

The following player received entry as a lucky loser:

- (United States) Alafia Ayeni

== Champions ==
=== Singles ===
- (Argentina) Facundo Mena def. (Bolivia) Hugo Dellien 7–6^{(7–4)}, 6–4.

=== Doubles ===
- (Spain) Sergio Martos Gornés / (Poland) Szymon Walków def. (Spain) Pedro Vives Marcos / (Spain) Benjamín Winter López 6–4, 4–6, [10–5].
