= 2026 CT Porto Cup – Doubles =

Doubles
- 2026 CT Porto Cup

Final
- Champions: (Spain) Sergio Martos Gornés (Poland) Szymon Walków
- Runners-up: (Spain) Pedro Vives Marcos (Spain) Benjamín Winter López
- Score: 6–4, 4–6, [10–5]

Events
Singles	Doubles
- CT Porto Cup

Szymon Kielan and Filip Pieczonka were the defending champions but only Kielan chose to defend his title, partnering Joran Vliegen. They lost in the quarterfinals to Pedro Vives Marcos and Benjamín Winter López.

Sergio Martos Gornés and Szymon Walków won the title after defeating Vives Marcos and Winter López 6–4, 4–6, [10–5] in the final.

== Seeds ==
1. (Spain) Íñigo Cervantes / (Ukraine) Denys Molchanov (first round)
2. (Spain) Sergio Martos Gornés / (Poland) Szymon Walków (champions)
3. (Colombia) Nicolás Barrientos / (Argentina) Facundo Mena (first round)
4. (Netherlands) Jarno Jans / (Netherlands) Niels Visker (first round)

== Draw ==
Key

- Q = Qualifier
- WC = Wild card
- LL = Lucky loser
- Alt = Alternate
- ITF = ITF entry
- PR = Protected ranking
- SR = Special ranking
- SE = Special exempt
- JE = Junior exempt
- JR = Junior Accelerator Programme entrant
- CO = College Accelerator Programme entrant
- NG = Next Gen Accelerator Program entrant
- w/o = Walkover
- r = Retired
- d = Defaulted

First round
1	(Spain) Í Cervantes (Ukraine) D Molchanov	3	6^{4}
(Poland) S Kielan (Belgium) J Vliegen	6	7^{7}
(Spain) P Vives Marcos (Spain) B Winter López	6	6
(Bolivia) B Arias (Uruguay) I Carou	1	2
3	(Colombia) N Barrientos (Argentina) F Mena	6	4	[4]
(Czech Republic) Z Kolář (Czech Republic) D Poljak	1	6	[10]
WC	(Portugal) José Freitas (Portugal) Guilherme Valdoleiros	3	1
(Spain) M Damas (Spain) A Moro Cañas	6	6
WC	(Portugal) Gonçalo Marques (Portugal) João Silva	6^{6}	0
(Spain) Rafael Izquierdo Luque (Portugal) Francisco Rocha	7^{8}	6
(Spain) M Mansilla Díez (Brazil) E Ribeiro	6	7^{7}
4	(Netherlands) J Jans (Netherlands) N Visker	4	6^{4}
(Portugal) T Pereira (Spain) B Pujol Navarro	6^{4}	5
(United States) A Ayeni (Slovakia) L Pokorný	7^{7}	7
(Spain) M Alcalá Gurri (Spain) O Roca Batalla	2	2
2	(Spain) S Martos Gornés (Poland) S Walków	6	6

Quarterfinals
(Poland) S Kielan (Belgium) J Vliegen	3	6^{10}
(Spain) P Vives Marcos (Spain) B Winter López	6	7^{12}
(Czech Republic) Z Kolář (Czech Republic) D Poljak	w/o
(Spain) M Damas (Spain) A Moro Cañas
(Spain) R Izquierdo Luque (Portugal) F Rocha	6	2	[10]
(Spain) M Mansilla Díez (Brazil) E Ribeiro	4	6	[3]
(United States) A Ayeni (Slovakia) L Pokorný	4	4
2	(Spain) S Martos Gornés (Poland) S Walków	6	6

Semifinals
(Spain) P Vives Marcos (Spain) B Winter López	6	6
(Czech Republic) Z Kolář (Czech Republic) D Poljak	4	4
(Spain) R Izquierdo Luque (Portugal) F Rocha	1	6	[4]
2	(Spain) S Martos Gornés (Poland) S Walków	6	3	[10]

Final
(Spain) P Vives Marcos (Spain) B Winter López	4	6	[5]
2	(Spain) S Martos Gornés (Poland) S Walków	6	4	[10]
