= 2025 Clube Tenis Porto Challenger – Doubles =

Doubles
- 2025 Clube Tenis Porto Challenger

Final
- Champions: (Poland) Szymon Kielan (Poland) Filip Pieczonka
- Runners-up: (Serbia) Ivan Sabanov (Serbia) Matej Sabanov
- Score: 6–2, 6–4

Events
Singles	Doubles
- Clube Tenis Porto Challenger

Daniel Cukierman and Piotr Matuszewski were the defending champions but chose not to defend their title.

Szymon Kielan and Filip Pieczonka won the title after defeating Ivan and Matej Sabanov 6–2, 6–4 in the final.

== Seeds ==
1. (Peru) Alexander Merino / (Germany) Christoph Negritu (quarterfinals)
2. (Poland) Szymon Kielan / (Poland) Filip Pieczonka (champions)
3. (Spain) Mario Mansilla Díez / (Spain) Bruno Pujol Navarro (first round)
4. (Serbia) Ivan Sabanov / (Serbia) Matej Sabanov (final)

== Draw ==
Key

- Q = Qualifier
- WC = Wild card
- LL = Lucky loser
- Alt = Alternate
- ITF = ITF entry
- PR = Protected ranking
- SR = Special ranking
- SE = Special exempt
- JE = Junior exempt
- JR = Junior Accelerator Programme entrant
- CO = College Accelerator Programme entrant
- NG = Next Gen Accelerator Program entrant
- w/o = Walkover
- r = Retired
- d = Defaulted

=== Draw ===
First round
1	(Peru) A Merino (Germany) C Negritu	6	6
(Czech Republic) J Jermář (Poland) D Michalski	4	4
(Portugal) Francisco Rocha (Portugal) H Rocha	w/o
(Argentina) A Barrena (Spain) C Sánchez Jover
4	(Serbia) I Sabanov (Serbia) M Sabanov	6^{3}	6	[10]
(Spain) N Álvarez Varona (Spain) N Sánchez Izquierdo	7^{7}	3	[4]
(United Kingdom) S Duncan (United Kingdom) T Hands	6	6
WC	(Portugal) Hugo Maia (Portugal) Guilherme Valdoleiros	2	4
(Spain) Àlex Martínez (United States) Jamie Vance	1	1
(Sweden) E Grevelius (Sweden) A Heinonen	6	6
(United States) S Bangoura (Spain) D Vega Hernández	7^{7}	6
3	(Spain) M Mansilla Díez (Spain) B Pujol Navarro	6^{3}	4
WC	(Portugal) Tomás Serrano Luís (Portugal) T Torres	3	5
(Netherlands) M Hermans (Croatia) M Poljičak	6	7
(Mexico) A Hernández (Canada) D Martin	0	3
2	(Poland) S Kielan (Poland) F Pieczonka	6	6

Quarterfinals
1	(Peru) A Merino (Germany) C Negritu	1	5
(Portugal) F Rocha (Portugal) H Rocha	6	7
4	(Serbia) I Sabanov (Serbia) M Sabanov	6	6
(United Kingdom) S Duncan (United Kingdom) T Hands	3	3
(Sweden) E Grevelius (Sweden) A Heinonen	6	6
(United States) S Bangoura (Spain) D Vega Hernández	2	3
(Netherlands) M Hermans (Croatia) M Poljičak	3	0
2	(Poland) S Kielan (Poland) F Pieczonka	6	6

Semifinals
(Portugal) F Rocha (Portugal) H Rocha	6^{3}	3
4	(Serbia) I Sabanov (Serbia) M Sabanov	7^{7}	6
(Sweden) E Grevelius (Sweden) A Heinonen	3	6^{1}
2	(Poland) S Kielan (Poland) F Pieczonka	6	7^{7}

Final
4	(Serbia) I Sabanov (Serbia) M Sabanov	2	4
2	(Poland) S Kielan (Poland) F Pieczonka	6	6
