= 2026 Challenger La Manche – Singles =

Singles
- 2026 Challenger La Manche

Final
- Champion: Pavel Kotov
- Runner-up: (Italy) Filippo Romano
- Score: 6–2, 7–5

Events
Singles	Doubles
- Challenger La Manche

Pierre-Hugues Herbert was the defending champion but lost in the first round to Patrick Brady.

Pavel Kotov won the title after defeating Filippo Romano 6–2, 7–5 in the final.

== Seeds ==
1. (Norway) Nicolai Budkov Kjær (first round)
2. (France) Pierre-Hugues Herbert (first round)
3. (Japan) Yosuke Watanuki (withdrew)
4. (Estonia) Daniil Glinka (first round)
5. (Austria) Jurij Rodionov (semifinals)
6. (France) Clément Chidekh (first round)
7. (France) Clément Tabur (quarterfinals)
8. (Croatia) Borna Gojo (semifinals)

== Draw ==
Key

- Q = Qualifier
- WC = Wild card
- LL = Lucky loser
- Alt = Alternate
- ITF = ITF entry
- PR = Protected ranking
- SR = Special ranking
- SE = Special exempt
- JE = Junior exempt
- JR = Junior Accelerator Programme entrant
- CO = College Accelerator Programme entrant
- NG = Next Gen Accelerator Program entrant
- w/o = Walkover
- r = Retired
- d = Defaulted

=== Finals ===
Semifinals
8	(Croatia) Borna Gojo	4	6	3
Pavel Kotov	6	3	6
5	(Austria) Jurij Rodionov	6^{5}	6	4
Q	(Italy) Filippo Romano	7^{7}	2	6

Final
Pavel Kotov	6	7
Q	(Italy) Filippo Romano	2	5

=== Top half ===
First round
1	(Norway) N Budkov Kjær	5	1
(Switzerland) R Bertola	7	6
(Denmark) A Holmgren	6	4	6
WC	(France) T Faurel	1	6	4
(Netherlands) J Sels	5	3
(France) G Blancaneaux	7	6
WC	(France) L Lokoli	3	3
8	(Croatia) B Gojo	6	6
4	(Estonia) D Glinka	7	1	4
(France) D Added	5	6	6
(Czech Republic) M Krumich	2	5
(United States) M Cassone	6	7
(United States) K Smith	6	6^{7}	2
(France) M Martineau	3	7^{9}	6
P Kotov	1	6	7^{7}
6	(France) C Chidekh	6	1	6^{4}

Second round
(Switzerland) R Bertola	7^{7}	7^{7}
(Denmark) A Holmgren	6^{5}	6^{3}
(France) G Blancaneaux	5	7^{7}	4
8	(Croatia) B Gojo	7	6^{4}	6
(France) D Added	2	3
(United States) M Cassone	6	6
(France) M Martineau	4	7^{7}	6^{3}
P Kotov	6	6^{1}	7^{7}

Quarterfinals
(Switzerland) R Bertola	4	6^{6}
8	(Croatia) B Gojo	6	7^{8}
(United States) M Cassone	1	1
P Kotov	6	6

Semifinals
8	(Croatia) B Gojo	4	6	3
P Kotov	6	3	6

=== Bottom half ===
First round
5	(Austria) J Rodionov	4	6	6
Q	(France) M Janvier	6	1	4
LL	(Luxembourg) A Knaff	6	6
Q	(Netherlands) N Visker	4	1
(Belgium) G Onclin	6	7^{7}
WC	(France) S Gueymard Wayenburg	0	6^{4}
(France) T Paris	4	6^{4}
Q	(France) L Poullain	6	7^{7}
7	(France) C Tabur	7^{7}	6
(Japan) K Nishikori	6^{5}	4
Q	(France) A Ghibaudo	6	3	6
(Belgium) GA Bailly	3	6	3
Alt	(France) Raphael Perot	3	6	3
Q	(Italy) F Romano	6	4	6
Q	(United Kingdom) Patrick Brady	7^{7}	4	6
2	(France) P-H Herbert	6^{5}	6	4

Second round
5	(Austria) J Rodionov	6	6
LL	(Luxembourg) A Knaff	1	4
(Belgium) G Onclin	6	6
Q	(France) L Poullain	4	4
7	(France) C Tabur	6	6
Q	(France) A Ghibaudo	2	2
Q	(Italy) F Romano	6^{5}	7^{7}	6
Q	(United Kingdom) P Brady	7^{7}	6^{2}	4

Quarterfinals
5	(Austria) J Rodionov	6	6
(Belgium) G Onclin	4	2
7	(France) C Tabur	3	6	3
Q	(Italy) F Romano	6	3	6

Semifinals
5	(Austria) J Rodionov	6^{5}	6	4
Q	(Italy) F Romano	7^{7}	2	6
