= 2024 Clube Tenis Porto Challenger – Singles =

Singles
- 2024 Clube Tenis Porto Challenger

Final
- Champion: (Bulgaria) Adrian Andreev
- Runner-up: (Spain) Carlos Taberner
- Score: 6–3, 6–0

Events
Singles	Doubles
- Clube Tenis Porto Challenger

This was the first edition of the tournament.

Adrian Andreev won the title after defeating Carlos Taberner 6–3, 6–0 in the final.

== Seeds ==
1. (Spain) Oriol Roca Batalla (first round)
2. (Portugal) Jaime Faria (second round)
3. (Portugal) Henrique Rocha (second round)
4. (Spain) Carlos Taberner (final)
5. (Argentina) Santiago Rodríguez Taverna (semifinals)
6. (Bulgaria) Adrian Andreev (champion)
7. (Italy) Gianluca Mager (second round, retired)
8. (Turkey) Ergi Kırkın (first round)

== Draw ==
Key

- Q = Qualifier
- WC = Wild card
- LL = Lucky loser
- Alt = Alternate
- ITF = ITF entry
- PR = Protected ranking
- SR = Special ranking
- SE = Special exempt
- JE = Junior exempt
- JR = Junior Accelerator Programme entrant
- CO = College Accelerator Programme entrant
- NG = Next Gen Accelerator Program entrant
- w/o = Walkover
- r = Retired
- d = Defaulted

=== Finals ===
Semifinals
6	(Bulgaria) Adrian Andreev	6	6
(Spain) Nikolás Sánchez Izquierdo	4	1
4	(Spain) Carlos Taberner	5	6	6
5	(Argentina) Santiago Rodríguez Taverna	7	0	0

Final
6	(Bulgaria) Adrian Andreev	6	6
4	(Spain) Carlos Taberner	3	0

=== Top half ===
First round
1	(Spain) O Roca Batalla	2	6	5
(Czech Republic) J Forejtek	6	4	7
WC	(Portugal) F Ferreira Silva	6^{4}	6^{5}
Q	(Israel) D Cukierman	7^{7}	7^{7}
(Germany) M Möller	2	4
Q	(Hungary) M Valkusz	6	6
Alt	(Spain) D Jordà Sanchis	4	4
6	(Bulgaria) A Andreev	6	6
3	(Portugal) H Rocha	6	6
Alt	(Israel) Y Oliel	1	2
(Brazil) P Sakamoto	2	6	2
(Germany) D Masur	6	2	6
I Gakhov	2	2
Q	(Czech Republic) H Bartoň	6	6
(Spain) N Sánchez Izquierdo	6	6
8	(Turkey) E Kırkın	3	0

Second round
(Czech Republic) J Forejtek	6	4	0
Q	(Israel) D Cukierman	3	6	6
Q	(Hungary) M Valkusz	4	2
6	(Bulgaria) A Andreev	6	6
3	(Portugal) H Rocha	6	1	4
(Germany) D Masur	4	6	6
Q	(Czech Republic) H Bartoň	3	4
(Spain) N Sánchez Izquierdo	6	6

Quarterfinals
Q	(Israel) D Cukierman	6^{7}	4
6	(Bulgaria) A Andreev	7^{9}	6
(Germany) D Masur	6^{7}	4
(Spain) N Sánchez Izquierdo	7^{9}	6

Semifinals
6	(Bulgaria) A Andreev	6	6
(Spain) N Sánchez Izquierdo	4	1

=== Bottom half ===
First round
7	(Italy) G Mager	6	7^{7}
LL	(Ukraine) O Krutykh	4	6^{4}
(Portugal) G Elias	4	5
(Croatia) D Prižmić	6	7
Q	(South Korea) G Campaña Lee	7^{7}	4	3
Q	(Tunisia) M Echargui	6^{4}	6	6
(Italy) F Agamenone	5	4
4	(Spain) C Taberner	7	6
5	(Argentina) S Rodríguez Taverna	6	2	7^{7}
Q	(Belgium) B Gadamauri	3	6	6^{4}
(Germany) S Fanselow	6	2	1
(Austria) L Neumayer	4	6	6
(Lebanon) H Habib	6^{5}	3
(Italy) E Dalla Valle	7^{7}	6
(Italy) L Giustino	1	6^{7}
2/WC	(Portugal) J Faria	6	7^{9}

Second round
7	(Italy) G Mager	0^{r}
(Croatia) D Prižmić	2
Q	(Tunisia) M Echargui	3	3
4	(Spain) C Taberner	6	6
5	(Argentina) S Rodríguez Taverna	6	6
(Austria) L Neumayer	3	4
(Italy) E Dalla Valle	6	3	7^{7}
2/WC	(Portugal) J Faria	1	6	6^{5}

Quarterfinals
(Croatia) D Prižmić	3	6	3
4	(Spain) C Taberner	6	1	6
5	(Argentina) S Rodríguez Taverna	7	7
(Italy) E Dalla Valle	5	5

Semifinals
4	(Spain) C Taberner	5	6	6
5	(Argentina) S Rodríguez Taverna	7	0	0
