= 2026 Challenger La Manche – Doubles =

Doubles
- 2026 Challenger La Manche

Final
- Champions: (Canada) Cleeve Harper (United Kingdom) David Stevenson
- Runners-up: (Poland) Karol Drzewiecki (Poland) Szymon Walków
- Score: 4–6, 6–3, [10–8]

Events
Singles	Doubles
- Challenger La Manche

Oleg Prihodko and Vitaliy Sachko were the defending champions but chose not to defend their title.

Cleeve Harper and David Stevenson won the title after defeating Karol Drzewiecki and Szymon Walków 4–6, 6–3, [10–8] in the final.

== Seeds ==
1. (Canada) Cleeve Harper / (United Kingdom) David Stevenson (champions)
2. (Poland) Szymon Kielan / (Romania) Bogdan Pavel (first round)
3. (Poland) Karol Drzewiecki / (Poland) Szymon Walków (final)
4. (Netherlands) Mats Hermans / (Netherlands) Mick Veldheer (quarterfinals)

== Draw ==
Key

- Q = Qualifier
- WC = Wild card
- LL = Lucky loser
- Alt = Alternate
- ITF = ITF entry
- PR = Protected ranking
- SR = Special ranking
- SE = Special exempt
- JE = Junior exempt
- JR = Junior Accelerator Programme entrant
- CO = College Accelerator Programme entrant
- NG = Next Gen Accelerator Program entrant
- w/o = Walkover
- r = Retired
- d = Defaulted

First round
1	(Canada) C Harper (United Kingdom) D Stevenson	6	4	[10]
(Italy) G Ricca (Italy) F Romano	3	6	[5]
(Switzerland) R Bertola (France) G Blancaneaux	3	7	[8]
(United Kingdom) B Jones (Czech Republic) D Poljak	6	5	[10]
4	(Netherlands) M Hermans (Netherlands) M Veldheer	6	6
(United Kingdom) S Duncan (United Kingdom) J MacKinlay	3	4
(France) Maxence Beaugé (France) M Martineau	4	4
(Sweden) E Grevelius (Sweden) A Heinonen	6	6
(Netherlands) J Jans (Netherlands) N Visker	6	6
WC	(France) K de Schepper (France) Pierre Antoine Faut	3	4
(France) M Janvier (France) Cyril Vandermeersch	3	4
3	(Poland) K Drzewiecki (Poland) S Walków	6	6
WC	(France) Marc Antoine Gaillard (France) Raphael Perot	6^{5}	4
(Spain) D Vega Hernández (Spain) B Winter López	7^{7}	6
(Netherlands) J Sels (United States) K Smith	6	6
2	(Poland) S Kielan (Romania) B Pavel	3	4

Quarterfinals
1	(Canada) C Harper (United Kingdom) D Stevenson	6	6
(United Kingdom) B Jones (Czech Republic) D Poljak	3	3
4	(Netherlands) M Hermans (Netherlands) M Veldheer	6	2	[2]
(Sweden) E Grevelius (Sweden) A Heinonen	3	6	[10]
(Netherlands) J Jans (Netherlands) N Visker	7^{9}	4	[8]
3	(Poland) K Drzewiecki (Poland) S Walków	6^{7}	6	[10]
(Spain) D Vega Hernández (Spain) B Winter López	3	4
(Netherlands) J Sels (United States) K Smith	6	6

Semifinals
1	(Canada) C Harper (United Kingdom) D Stevenson	5	6	[10]
(Sweden) E Grevelius (Sweden) A Heinonen	7	3	[8]
3	(Poland) K Drzewiecki (Poland) S Walków	6^{5}	6	[10]
(Netherlands) J Sels (United States) K Smith	7^{7}	3	[8]

Final
1	(Canada) C Harper (United Kingdom) D Stevenson	4	6	[10]
3	(Poland) K Drzewiecki (Poland) S Walków	6	3	[8]
