= 2026 Tunis Open – Singles =

Singles
- 2026 Tunis Open

Final
- Champion: (United States) Tristan Boyer
- Runner-up: (United States) Dali Blanch
- Score: 6–1, 6–0

Events
Singles	Doubles
- Tunis Open

Zsombor Piros was the defending champion but chose not to defend his title.

Tristan Boyer won the title after defeating Dali Blanch 6–1, 6–0 in the final.

== Seeds ==
1. (Czech Republic) Dalibor Svrčina (second round)
2. (Tunisia) Moez Echargui (first round)
3. (Austria) Joel Schwärzler (second round)
4. (Estonia) Daniil Glinka (second round)
5. (Argentina) Federico Agustín Gómez (second round)
6. (Argentina) Alex Barrena (first round, retired)
7. (Australia) Bernard Tomic (second round)
8. (Netherlands) Guy den Ouden (second round)

== Draw ==
Key

- Q = Qualifier
- WC = Wild card
- LL = Lucky loser
- Alt = Alternate
- ITF = ITF entry
- PR = Protected ranking
- SR = Special ranking
- SE = Special exempt
- JE = Junior exempt
- JR = Junior Accelerator Programme entrant
- CO = College Accelerator Programme entrant
- NG = Next Gen Accelerator Program entrant
- w/o = Walkover
- r = Retired
- d = Defaulted

=== Finals ===
Semifinals
Alt	(United States) Tristan Boyer	6	4	7
Q	(Spain) Iñaki Montes de la Torre	3	6	5
(Belgium) Kimmer Coppejans	1	7	6^{3}
Q	(United States) Dali Blanch	6	5	7^{7}

Final
Alt	(United States) Tristan Boyer	6	6
Q	(United States) Dali Blanch	1	0

=== Top half ===
First round
1	(Czech Republic) D Svrčina	6	6
JR	(Switzerland) H Bernet	1	2
Alt	(United States) T Boyer	7	4	4
WC	(Tunisia) A Dougaz	5	6	0^{r}
I Simakin	4	6	4
Q	(France) L Lokoli	6	4	6
WC	(Tunisia) S Mansouri	4	6^{5}
5	(Argentina) FA Gómez	6	7^{7}
3	(Austria) J Schwärzler	6^{2}	6	6
Q	(Italy) F Agamenone	7^{7}	3	1
NG	(Czech Republic) M Mrva	3	7^{7}	5
(Italy) F Cinà	6	6^{0}	7
Alt	(Japan) K Uchida	0	1
(Netherlands) M Houkes	6	6
Q	(Spain) I Montes de la Torre	1	7^{7}	4
6	(Argentina) A Barrena	6	6^{3}	0^{r}

Second round
1	(Czech Republic) D Svrčina	6	4	5
Alt	(United States) T Boyer	1	6	7
Q	(France) L Lokoli	6	6
5	(Argentina) FA Gómez	2	2
3	(Austria) J Schwärzler	4	1
(Italy) F Cinà	6	6
(Netherlands) M Houkes	0	2
Q	(Spain) I Montes de la Torre	6	6

Quarterfinals
Alt	(United States) T Boyer	6	4
Q	(France) L Lokoli	2	1^{r}
(Italy) F Cinà	2	2
Q	(Spain) I Montes de la Torre	6	6

Semifinals
Alt	(United States) T Boyer	6	4	7
Q	(Spain) I Montes de la Torre	3	6	5

=== Bottom half ===
First round
7	(Australia) B Tomic	6	6
WC	(Tunisia) A Ouakaa	3	2
(Belgium) K Coppejans	6	7^{7}
Q	(Lithuania) E Butvilas	4	6^{5}
(Belgium) GA Bailly	4	6	6
(France) H Mayot	6	0	1
JR	(Germany) N McDonald	2	5
4	(Estonia) D Glinka	6	7
8	(Netherlands) G den Ouden	6	6
(France) D Added	2	3
(China) Y Zhou	7^{7}	5	0
Q	(United States) Dali Blanch	6^{4}	7	6
Q	(Spain) P Martín Tiffon	6	6
(United Kingdom) C Broom	2	2
(United Kingdom) J Clarke	6	6
2	(Tunisia) M Echargui	0	3

Second round
7	(Australia) B Tomic	1	5
(Belgium) K Coppejans	6	7
(Belgium) GA Bailly	6	6
4	(Estonia) D Glinka	3	2
8	(Netherlands) G den Ouden	4	4
Q	(United States) Dal Blanch	6	6
Q	(Spain) P Martín Tiffon	5	1
(United Kingdom) J Clarke	7	6

Quarterfinals
(Belgium) K Coppejans	6	6
(Belgium) GA Bailly	4	3
Q	(United States) Dal Blanch	6	3	6
(United Kingdom) J Clarke	0	6	1

Semifinals
(Belgium) K Coppejans	1	7	6^{3}
Q	(United States) Dal Blanch	6	5	7^{7}
