= 2026 Internazionali di Tennis Città di Todi =

- Date: 10–16 August
- Edition: 20th
- Surface: Clay
- Location: Todi, Italy

Champions

Singles
- (Czech Republic) Maxim Mrva

Doubles
- (France) Arthur Reymond / (France) Luca Sanchez
- Internazionali di Tennis Città di Todi

The 2026 Internazionali di Tennis Città di Todi was a professional tennis tournament played on clay courts. It was the 20th edition of the tournament which was part of the 2026 ATP Challenger Tour. It took place in Todi, Italy between 10 and 16 August 2026.

== Singles main-draw entrants ==
=== Seeds ===
Country	Player	Rank^{1}	Seed
ITA	Stefano Travaglia	140	1
AUT	Lukas Neumayer	169	2
ITA	Marco Cecchinato	170	3
ARG	Federico Agustín Gómez	174	4
ESP	Nikolás Sánchez Izquierdo	214	5
ITA	Francesco Passaro	219	6
ARG	Alex Barrena	261	7
ARG	Juan Bautista Torres	266	8

- ^{1} Rankings are as of 3 August 2026.

=== Other entrants ===
The following players received wildcards into the singles main draw:

- (Italy) Pierluigi Basile
- (Italy) Francesco Forti
- (Italy) Massimo Giunta

The following player received entry into the singles main draw as a special exempt:

- (Italy) Gabriele Piraino

The following player received entry into the singles main draw as an alternate:

- (Argentina) Nicolás Kicker

The following players received entry from the qualifying draw:

- (Italy) Carlo Alberto Caniato
- (Italy) Lorenzo Carboni
- (Ukraine) Georgii Kravchenko
- (Ukraine) Nikita Mashtakov
- (Italy) Michele Mecarelli
- (Italy) Alexander Weis

The following player received entry as a lucky loser:

- (Italy) Juan Cruz Martin Manzano

== Champions ==
=== Singles ===
- (Czech Republic) Maxim Mrva def. (Argentina) Nicolás Kicker 6–2, 6–2.

=== Doubles ===
- (France) Arthur Reymond / (France) Luca Sanchez def. (Spain) Mario Mansilla Díez / (Spain) Benjamín Winter López 6–2, 6–4.
