= Szymon Walków =

Polish tennis player

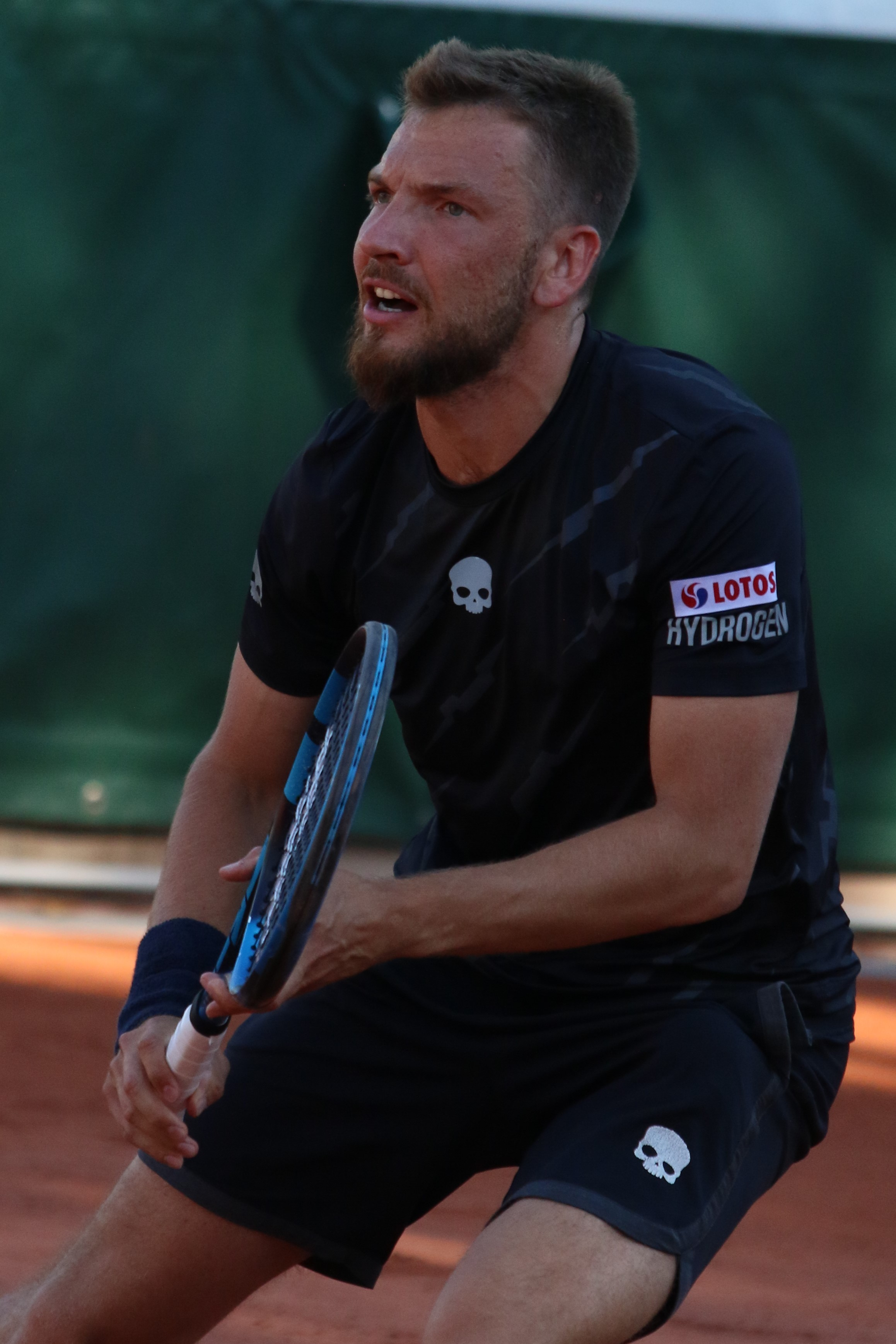
- Walków at the 2021 French Open
- Country (sports): Poland
- Residence: Wrocław, Poland
- Born: 22 September 1995 (age 30) Wrocław, Poland
- Height: 1.78 m (5 ft 10 in)
- Plays: Right-handed (two-handed backhand)
- Coach: Rafal Paluch
- Prize money: $319,825

Singles
- Career record: 0–0
- Career titles: 0; 1 Futures
- Highest ranking: No. 818 (3 December 2018)

Doubles
- Career record: 11–15
- Career titles: 0; 12 Challenger, 12 Futures
- Highest ranking: No. 86 (13 June 2022)
- Current ranking: No. 145 (15 September 2024)

Grand Slam doubles results
- French Open: 1R (2021, 2022)
- Wimbledon: 2R (2022)
- US Open: 2R (2021)
- Last updated on: 22 September 2025.

Szymon Walków (Polish pronunciation: [ˈʂɨmɔn ˈvalkuf]; born 22 September 1995) is a Polish tennis player who specializes in doubles. He has a career high ATP doubles ranking of World No. 86 achieved on 13 June 2022. He has reached one ATP doubles final. Walków has also reached 43 career doubles finals with a record of 24 wins and 19 losses, including a 12–9 record in ATP Challenger Tour finals. He also has a career high singles ranking of No. 818 achieved on 3 December 2018.

== Career ==
Walków reached one ITF singles final, winning the title at the Poland F4 futures tournament in Koszalin in 2018.

Walków reached his maiden ATP doubles final at the 2021 Swiss Open Gstaad partnering Jan Zieliński. In January 2022, he made his debut participating as part of the Polish team at the 2022 ATP Cup, where he played doubles with Zieliński and won against Georgia and Argentina. After Hurkacz's win over Diego Schwartzman sealed the victory for Poland over Argentina the Polish team advanced to the semifinals. The pair won again against Spain in doubles but the team did not advance to the finals.

In September 2025 he won the biggest title in his career at the Genoa Open Challenger 125, partnering Mick Veldheer.

== ATP career finals ==
=== Doubles: 1 (1 runner-up) ===
Legend Grand Slam tournaments (0–0) ATP World Tour Finals (0–0) ATP World Tour Masters 1000 (0–0) ATP World Tour 500 Series (0–0) ATP World Tour 250 Series (0–1)	Titles by surface Hard (0–0) Clay (0–1) Grass (0–0)	Titles by setting Outdoor (0–1) Indoor (0–0)

Result	W–L	Date	Tournament	Tier	Surface	Partner	Opponents	Score
Loss	0–1	Jul 2021	Swiss Open Gstaad, Switzerland	250 Series	Clay	(Poland) Jan Zieliński	(Switzerland) Marc-Andrea Hüsler (Switzerland) Dominic Stricker	1–6, 6–7^{(7–9)}

== ATP Challenger and ITF Tour finals ==
=== Singles: 1 (1–0) ===
Legend ATP Challenger (0–0) ITF Futures (1–0)	Finals by surface Hard (0–0) Clay (1–0) Carpet (0–0)

Result	W–L	Date	Tournament	Tier	Surface	Opponent	Score
Win	1–0	Aug 2018	Poland F6, Koszalin	Futures	Clay	(Poland) Maciej Rajski	4–6, 7–5, 6–1

=== Doubles: 48 (28–20) ===
Legend ATP Challenger (16–10) ITF Futures (12–10)	Finals by surface Hard (7–6) Clay (20–11) Carpet (1–3)

Result	W–L	Date	Tournament	Tier	Surface	Partner	Opponents	Score
Loss	0–1	May 2015	Czech Republic F1, Prague	Futures	Clay	(Poland) Kamil Gajewski	(Czech Republic) František Čermák (Czech Republic) Robin Stanek	3–6, 3–6
Loss	0–2	Sep 2015	Poland F4, Bytom	Futures	Clay	(Poland) Hubert Hurkacz	(Czech Republic) Jan Kuncik (Czech Republic) Petr Michnev	7–5, 5–7, [8–10]
Loss	0–3	May 2016	Czech Republic F3, Jablonec nad Nisou	Futures	Clay	(Poland) Hubert Hurkacz	(Germany) Jan Choinski (Germany) Tom Schonenberg	2–6, 6–7^{(7–9)}
Win	1–3	Jun 2016	Poland F2, Koszalin	Futures	Clay	(Poland) Kamil Gajewski	(Poland) Adam Majchrowicz (Poland) Grzegorz Panfil	6–2, 6–1
Loss	1–4	Aug 2016	Poland F6, Poznań	Futures	Clay	(Poland) Adam Majchrowicz	(Poland) Marcin Gawron (Poland) Andriej Kapaś	4–6, 5–7
Win	2–4	Oct 2016	Egypt F28, Sharm El Sheikh	Futures	Hard	(Poland) Kamil Gajewski	(Italy) Antonio Massara (Italy) Andrea Vavassori	7–6^{(8–6)}, 6–3
Loss	2–5	Nov 2016	Egypt F34, Sharm El Sheikh	Futures	Hard	(Poland) Kamil Gajewski	(Poland) P Matuszewski (Poland) Kacper Żuk	6–3, 2–6, [7–10]
Loss	2–6	Jul 2017	Poland F5, Mragowo	Futures	Clay	(Poland) Kamil Gajewski	(Argentina) M Pena Lopez (United Kingdom) Ewan Moore	2–6, 5–7
Win	3–6	Sep 2017	Poland F11, Koszalin	Futures	Clay	(Ecuador) Iván Endara	(Poland) Michal Dembek (Poland) Marcin Gawron	6–3, 2–6, [10–7]
Loss	3–7	Oct 2017	Czech Republic F7, Jablonec nad Nisou	Futures	Carpet	(Poland) Mateusz Kowalczyk	(Netherlands) Niels Lootsma (Czech Republic) David Poljak	6–2, 4–6, [6–10]
Loss	3–8	Nov 2017	Czech Republic F8, Opava	Futures	Carpet	(Poland) Mateusz Kowalczyk	(Poland) Maciej Smola (Poland) Karol Drzewiecki	6–7^{(4–7)}, 7–6^{(7–4)}, [8–10]
Win	4–8	Nov 2017	Czech Republic F9, Milovice	Futures	Hard	(Czech Republic) Marek Gengel	(Czech Republic) Michal Konecny (Czech Republic) Filip Duda	6–3, 6–7^{(4–7)}, [10–5]
Win	5–8	Nov 2017	Czech Republic F10, Říčany	Futures	Hard	(Poland) Karol Drzewiecki	(Czech Republic) Matěj Vocel (Czech Republic) Michael Vrbenský	3–6, 6–3, [10–8]
Loss	5–9	Dec 2017	Egypt F36, Cairo	Futures	Clay	(Poland) Karol Drzewiecki	(Brazil) Jordan Correia (Spain) Mario Vilella Martínez	6–7^{(11–13)}, 6–7^{(4–7)}
Win	6–9	Apr 2018	Italy F9, Santa Margherita Di Pula	Futures	Clay	(United States) Sekou Bangoura	(Romania) Vasile Antonescu (Romania) Patrick Grigoriu	6–4, 6–4
Win	7–9	May 2018	Poland F3, Ustroń	Futures	Clay	(United States) Sekou Bangoura	(Czech Republic) Vít Kopřiva (Czech Republic) David Poljak	0–6, 6–1, [10–4]
Win	8–9	Jun 2018	Poznań, Poland	Challenger	Clay	(Poland) Mateusz Kowalczyk	(Hungary) Attila Balázs (Italy) Andrea Vavassori	7–5, 6–7^{(8–10)}, [10–8]
Win	9–9	Aug 2018	Sopot, Poland	Challenger	Clay	(Poland) Mateusz Kowalczyk	(Philippines) Ruben Gonzales (United States) Nathaniel Lammons	7–6^{(8–6)}, 6–3
Win	10–9	Aug 2018	Poland F8, Poznań	Futures	Clay	(Poland) Tomasz Bednarek	(Poland) Mateusz Kowalczyk (Poland) Karol Drzewiecki	6–4, 6–3
Loss	10–10	Nov 2018	Czech Republic F8, Opava	Futures	Carpet	(Poland) Karol Drzewiecki	(Czech Republic) Jaroslav Pospíšil (Czech Republic) Vít Kopřiva	6–7^{(5–7)}, 4–6
Win	11–10	Nov 2018	Czech Republic F10, Milovice	Futures	Hard	(Poland) Karol Drzewiecki	(Czech Republic) D Langmajer (Czech Republic) Daniel Lustig	5–7, 7–6^{(9–7)}, [15–13]
Win	12–10	Nov 2018	Andria, Italy	Challenger	Hard	(Poland) Karol Drzewiecki	(Switzerland) Marc-Andrea Hüsler (Netherlands) David Pel	7–6^{(12–10)}, 2–6, [11–9]
Win	13–10	Jan 2019	M25 Nussloch, Germany	World Tennis Tour	Carpet	(Poland) Karol Drzewiecki	(Czech Republic) Marek Gengel (Ukraine) Danylo Kalenichenko	7–5, 6–3
Loss	13–11	Jul 2019	Perugia, Italy	Challenger	Clay	(Brazil) Rogério Dutra Silva	(Croatia) Ante Pavić (Bosnia and Herzegovina) Tomislav Brkić	4–6, 3–6
Loss	13–12	Sep 2019	Mallorca, Spain	Challenger	Hard	(Poland) Karol Drzewiecki	(Netherlands) Sander Arends (Netherlands) David Pel	5–7, 4–6
Loss	13–13	Oct 2019	Nur-Sultan, Kazakhstan	Challenger	Hard	(Poland) Karol Drzewiecki	(Ukraine) Illya Marchenko (Finland) Harri Heliövaara	4–6, 4–6
Win	14–13	Feb 2020	M25 Glasgow, United Kingdom	World Tennis Tour	Hard	(Poland) Jan Zieliński	(United Kingdom) Evan Hoyt (Sweden) Simon Freund	6–1, 6–1
Win	15–13	Mar 2020	M25 Sunderland, United Kingdom	World Tennis Tour	Hard	(Poland) Jan Zieliński	(Netherlands) Jesper De Jong (Netherlands) Bart Stevens	6–4, 6–4
Loss	15–14	Sep 2020	Ostrava, Czech Republic	Challenger	Clay	(Poland) Karol Drzewiecki	(Slovakia) Igor Zelenay (New Zealand) Artem Sitak	5–7, 4–6
Win	16–14	Oct 2020	Biella, Italy	Challenger	Clay	(Finland) Harri Heliövaara	(United Kingdom) Lloyd Glasspool (United States) Alex Lawson	7–5, 6-3
Win	17–14	Oct 2020	Barcelona, Spain	Challenger	Clay	(Austria) Tristan-Samuel Weissborn	(Finland) Harri Heliövaara (United States) Alex Lawson	6–1, 4–6, [10–8]
Loss	17–15	Feb 2021	Biella, Italy	Challenger	Hard	(Poland) Jan Zieliński	(Venezuela) Luis David Martinez (Spain) David Vega Hernández	4–6, 6–3, [8–10]
Loss	17–16	Apr 2021	Split, Croatia	Challenger	Clay	(Poland) Jan Zieliński	(Kazakhstan) Andrey Golubev (Kazakhstan) Aleksandr Nedovyesov	5–7, 7–6^{(7–5)}, [5–10]
Win	18–16	Apr 2021	Split II, Croatia	Challenger	Clay	(Poland) Jan Zieliński	(France) Grégoire Barrère (France) Albano Olivetti	6-2, 7-5
Win	19–16	Jul 2021	Sparkassen Open, Germany	Challenger	Clay	(Poland) Jan Zieliński	(Croatia) Ivan Sabanov (Croatia) Matej Sabanov	6–4, 4–6, [10–4]
Win	20–16	Aug 2021	Meerbusch, Germany	Challenger	Clay	(Poland) Jan Zieliński	(Germany) Dustin Brown (Netherlands) Robin Haase	6-3, 6-1
Loss	20–17	Apr 2022	Barletta, Italy	Challenger	Clay	(Japan) Ben McLachlan	Evgeny Karlovskiy; Evgenii Tiurnev	3-6, 4-6
Win	21–17	Apr 2022	Prague, Czech Republic	Challenger	Clay	(Portugal) Francisco Cabral	(France) Tristan Lamasine (France) Lucas Pouille	6–2, 7–6^{(14–12)}
Win	22–17	May 2022	Poznań, Poland	Challenger	Clay	(United States) Hunter Reese	(Czech Republic) Marek Gengel (Czech Republic) Adam Pavlásek	1–6, 6–3, [10–6]
Win	23–17	Aug 2022	Meerbusch, Germany	Challenger	Clay	(Netherlands) David Pel	(Austria) Neil Oberleitner (Austria) Philipp Oswald	7–5, 6–1
Loss	23–18	Nov 2022	Roanne, France	Challenger	Hard (i)	(Jamaica) Dustin Brown	(France) Sadio Doumbia (France) Fabien Reboul	6–7^{(5–7)}, 4–6
Loss	23–19	Sep 2024	Szczecin, Poland	Challenger	Clay	(United States) Ryan Seggerman	(Argentina) Guido Andreozzi (France) Théo Arribagé	2–6, 1–6
Win	24–19	Sep 2025	Genoa, Italy	Challenger	Clay	(Netherlands) Mick Veldheer	(Italy) Lorenzo Carboni (Italy) Gianluca Cadenasso	3–6, 6–3, [10–7]
Loss	24–20	Mar 2026	Cherbourg-en-Cotentin, France	Challenger	Hard (i)	(Poland) Karol Drzewiecki	(Canada) Cleeve Harper (United Kingdom) David Stevenson	6–4, 3–6, [8–10]
Win	25–20	Apr 2026	Ostrava, Czech Republic	Challenger	Clay	(Spain) Sergio Martos Gornés	(Poland) Karol Drzewiecki (Poland) Piotr Matuszewski	6–7^{(3–7)}, 7–5, [10–8]
Win	26–20	May 2026	Tunis, Tunisia	Challenger	Clay	(Spain) Sergio Martos Gornés	(Czech Republic) Hynek Bartoň (Czech Republic) Michael Vrbenský	1–6, 7–5, [10–8]
Win	27–20	Jun 2026	Poznań, Poland	Challenger	Clay	(Spain) Sergio Martos Gornés	(Poland) Karol Drzewiecki (Poland) Piotr Matuszewski	6–3, 7–5
Win	28–20	Aug 2026	Porto, Portugal	Challenger	Clay	(Spain) Sergio Martos Gornés	(Spain) Pedro Vives Marcos (Spain) Benjamín Winter López	6–4, 4–6, [10–5]
