= 2026 Tunis Open – Doubles =

Doubles
- 2026 Tunis Open

Final
- Champions: (Spain) Sergio Martos Gornés (Poland) Szymon Walków
- Runners-up: (Czech Republic) Hynek Bartoň (Czech Republic) Michael Vrbenský
- Score: 1–6, 7–5, [10–8]

Events
Singles	Doubles
- Tunis Open

Hynek Bartoň and Michael Vrbenský were the defending champions but lost in the final to Sergio Martos Gornés and Szymon Walków.

Martos Gornés and Walków won the title after defeating Bartoň and Vrbenský 1–6, 7–5, [10–8] in the final.

== Seeds ==
1. (Spain) Sergio Martos Gornés / (Poland) Szymon Walków (champions)
2. (Spain) Íñigo Cervantes / (Slovakia) Miloš Karol (semifinals)
3. (Czech Republic) Hynek Bartoň / (Czech Republic) Michael Vrbenský (final)
4. (Slovakia) Lukáš Pokorný / (Czech Republic) David Poljak (quarterfinals)

== Draw ==
Key

- Q = Qualifier
- WC = Wild card
- LL = Lucky loser
- Alt = Alternate
- ITF = ITF entry
- PR = Protected ranking
- SR = Special ranking
- SE = Special exempt
- JE = Junior exempt
- JR = Junior Accelerator Programme entrant
- CO = College Accelerator Programme entrant
- NG = Next Gen Accelerator Program entrant
- w/o = Walkover
- r = Retired
- d = Defaulted

First round
(Italy) Simone Agostini (Argentina) F Ribero	6	6
(Netherlands) J Jans (Tunisia) S Mansouri	4	2
4	(Slovakia) L Pokorný (Czech Republic) D Poljak	6	4	[10]
WC	(Tunisia) Rayen Hermassi (Tunisia) Adam Nagoudi	2	6	[8]
(United States) Dali Blanch (Spain) Carles Hernández	6	7^{7}
(Netherlands) T Loof (Ukraine) V Orlov	4	6^{4}
(Italy) F Agamenone (Italy) G Ricca	4	2
(United Kingdom) J Clarke (United Kingdom) B Jones	6	6
WC	(Tunisia) Mahmoud Chetouane (Tunisia) Skander Nsairi	1	2
3	(Czech Republic) H Bartoň (Czech Republic) M Vrbenský	6	6
(Tunisia) A Ouakaa; I Simakin	6	4	[10]
(Brazil) L Britto (Brazil) PA Saraiva dos Santos	4	6	[3]

Quarterfinals
1	(Spain) S Martos Gornés (Poland) S Walków	6	7
(Italy) S Agostini (Argentina) F Ribero	3	5
4	(Slovakia) L Pokorný (Czech Republic) D Poljak	6^{3}	6	[8]
(United States) Dal Blanch (Spain) C Hernández	7^{7}	1	[10]
(United Kingdom) J Clarke (United Kingdom) B Jones	3	3
3	(Czech Republic) H Bartoň (Czech Republic) M Vrbenský	6	6
(Tunisia) A Ouakaa; I Simakin	3	5
2	(Spain) Í Cervantes (Slovakia) M Karol	6	7

Semifinals
1	(Spain) S Martos Gornés (Poland) S Walków	7	6
(United States) Dal Blanch (Spain) C Hernández	5	1
3	(Czech Republic) H Bartoň (Czech Republic) M Vrbenský	6	6
2	(Spain) Í Cervantes (Slovakia) M Karol	2	4

Final
1	(Spain) S Martos Gornés (Poland) S Walków	1	7	[10]
3	(Czech Republic) H Bartoň (Czech Republic) M Vrbenský	6	5	[8]
