= 2024 Clube Tenis Porto Challenger =

- Date: 26 August – 1 September
- Edition: 1st
- Surface: Clay
- Location: Porto, Portugal

Champions

Singles
- (Bulgaria) Adrian Andreev

Doubles
- (Israel) Daniel Cukierman / (Poland) Piotr Matuszewski
- Clube Tenis Porto Challenger

The 2024 CT Porto Cup was a professional tennis tournament played on clay courts. It was the 1st edition of the tournament which was part of the 2024 ATP Challenger Tour. It took place in Porto, Portugal between 26 August and 1 September 2024.

== Singles main-draw entrants ==
=== Seeds ===
Country	Player	Rank^{1}	Seed
ESP	Oriol Roca Batalla	150	1
POR	Jaime Faria	157	2
POR	Henrique Rocha	165	3
ESP	Carlos Taberner	204	4
ARG	Santiago Rodríguez Taverna	239	5
BUL	Adrian Andreev	258	6
ITA	Gianluca Mager	263	7
TUR	Ergi Kırkın	266	8

- ^{1} Rankings are as of 19 August 2024.

=== Other entrants ===
The following players received wildcards into the singles main draw:

- (Portugal) Jaime Faria
- (Portugal) Frederico Ferreira Silva
- ~~(Portugal) Duarte Vale~~

The following players received entry into the singles main draw as alternates:

- (Spain) David Jordà Sanchis
- (Israel) Yshai Oliel

The following players received entry from the qualifying draw:

- (Czech Republic) Hynek Bartoň
- (South Korea) Gerard Campaña Lee
- (Israel) Daniel Cukierman
- (Tunisia) Moez Echargui
- (Belgium) Buvaysar Gadamauri
- (Hungary) Máté Valkusz

The following player received entry as a lucky loser:

- (Ukraine) Oleksii Krutykh

== Champions ==
=== Singles ===
- (Bulgaria) Adrian Andreev def. (Spain) Carlos Taberner 6–3, 6–0.

=== Doubles ===
- (Israel) Daniel Cukierman / (Poland) Piotr Matuszewski def. (Monaco) Romain Arneodo / (France) Théo Arribagé 6–4, 6–0.
