= 2026 Internazionali di Tennis Città di Todi – Doubles =

Doubles
- 2026 Internazionali di Tennis Città di Todi

Final
- Champions: (France) Arthur Reymond (France) Luca Sanchez
- Runners-up: (Spain) Mario Mansilla Díez (Spain) Benjamín Winter López
- Score: 6–2, 6–4

Events
Singles	Doubles
- Internazionali di Tennis Città di Todi

Filippo Romano and Jacopo Vasamì were the defending champions but only Romano chose to defend his title, partnering Francesco Forti. They lost in the semifinals to Arthur Reymond and Luca Sanchez.

Reymond and Sanchez won the title after defeating Mario Mansilla Díez and Benjamín Winter López 6–2, 6–4 in the final.

== Seeds ==
1. (France) Arthur Reymond / (France) Luca Sanchez (champions)
2. (Romania) Victor Vlad Cornea / (Israel) Daniel Cukierman (first round)
3. (Spain) Mario Mansilla Díez / (Spain) Benjamín Winter López (final)
4. (Uruguay) Ignacio Carou / (Colombia) Cristian Rodríguez (first round)

== Draw ==
Key

- Q = Qualifier
- WC = Wild card
- LL = Lucky loser
- Alt = Alternate
- ITF = ITF entry
- PR = Protected ranking
- SR = Special ranking
- SE = Special exempt
- JE = Junior exempt
- JR = Junior Accelerator Programme entrant
- CO = College Accelerator Programme entrant
- NG = Next Gen Accelerator Program entrant
- w/o = Walkover
- r = Retired
- d = Defaulted

First round
1	(France) A Reymond (France) L Sanchez	6	7^{8}
(United Kingdom) S Duncan (United Kingdom) M Whitehouse	3	6^{6}
WC	(Italy) Gabriele Crivellaro (Italy) Michele Mecarelli	4	6^{6}
(Argentina) A Barrena (Argentina) N Kicker	6	7^{8}
4	(Uruguay) I Carou (Colombia) C Rodríguez	1	1
(Italy) F Forti (Italy) F Romano	6	6
(Argentina) V Aboian (Argentina) JB Torres
(Bolivia) M Dellien (Argentina) F Mena	w/o
(Serbia) I Sabanov (Serbia) M Sabanov	6^{7}	3
(Argentina) Valentín Basel (Argentina) F Ribero	7^{9}	6
(Italy) Simone Agostini (Australia) Je Delaney	5	6	[8]
3	(Spain) M Mansilla Díez (Spain) B Winter López	7	4	[10]
(Poland) D Michalski (Spain) O Roca Batalla	7^{7}	6
WC	(Italy) Alessio De Bernardis (Italy) F Passaro	6^{5}	4
(Italy) Tommaso Compagnucci (Italy) G Ricca	7^{7}	7
2	(Romania) V Cornea (Israel) D Cukierman	6^{2}	5

Quarterfinals
1	(France) A Reymond (France) L Sanchez	6^{4}	6	[10]
(Argentina) A Barrena (Argentina) N Kicker	7^{7}	4	[3]
(Italy) F Forti (Italy) F Romano	6	4	[10]
(Bolivia) M Dellien (Argentina) F Mena	2	6	[6]
(Argentina) V Basel (Argentina) F Ribero	1	2
3	(Spain) M Mansilla Díez (Spain) B Winter López	6	6
(Poland) D Michalski (Spain) O Roca Batalla	6	3	[10]
(Italy) T Compagnucci (Italy) G Ricca	4	6	[8]

Semifinals
1	(France) A Reymond (France) L Sanchez	6	6
(Italy) F Forti (Italy) F Romano	3	4
3	(Spain) M Mansilla Díez (Spain) B Winter López	6	2	[10]
(Poland) D Michalski (Spain) O Roca Batalla	3	6	[7]

Final
1	(France) A Reymond (France) L Sanchez	6	6
3	(Spain) M Mansilla Díez (Spain) B Winter López	2	4
