= 2026 Tunis Open =

- Date: 11–16 May
- Edition: 16th
- Surface: Clay
- Location: Tunis, Tunisia

Champions

Singles
- (United States) Tristan Boyer

Doubles
- (Spain) Sergio Martos Gornés / (Poland) Szymon Walków
- Tunis Open

The 2026 Tunis Open, known as the Kia Tunis Open, was a professional tennis tournament played on clay courts. It was the 16th edition of the tournament which was part of the 2026 ATP Challenger Tour. It took place in Tunis, Tunisia between 11 and 16 May 2026.

== Singles main-draw entrants ==
=== Seeds ===
| Country | Player | Rank^{1} | Seed |
|---|---|---|---|
| CZE | Dalibor Svrčina | 116 | 1 |
| TUN | Moez Echargui | 140 | 2 |
| AUT | Joel Schwärzler | 172 | 3 |
| EST | Daniil Glinka | 178 | 4 |
| ARG | Federico Agustín Gómez | 186 | 5 |
| ARG | Alex Barrena | 189 | 6 |
| AUS | Bernard Tomic | 194 | 7 |
| NED | Guy den Ouden | 195 | 8 |

- ^{1} Rankings are as of 4 May 2026.

=== Other entrants ===
The following players received wildcards into the singles main draw:

- (Tunisia) Aziz Dougaz
- (Tunisia) Skander Mansouri
- (Tunisia) Aziz Ouakaa

The following players received entry into the singles main draw through the Junior Accelerator programme:

- (Switzerland) Henry Bernet
- (Germany) Niels McDonald

The following player received entry into the singles main draw through the Next Gen Accelerator programme:

- (Czech Republic) Maxim Mrva

The following players received entry into the singles main draw as alternates:

- (United States) Tristan Boyer
- (Japan) Kaichi Uchida

The following players received entry from the qualifying draw:

- (Italy) Franco Agamenone
- (United States) Dali Blanch
- (Lithuania) Edas Butvilas
- (France) Laurent Lokoli
- (Spain) Pol Martín Tiffon
- (Spain) Iñaki Montes de la Torre

== Champions ==
=== Singles ===
- (United States) Tristan Boyer def. (United States) Dali Blanch 6–1, 6–0.

=== Doubles ===
- (Spain) Sergio Martos Gornés / (Poland) Szymon Walków def. (Czech Republic) Hynek Bartoň / (Czech Republic) Michael Vrbenský 1–6, 7–5, [10–8].
