= 2026 Challenger La Manche =

- Date: 9–15 March
- Edition: 33rd
- Surface: Hard (indoor)
- Location: Cherbourg-en-Cotentin, France

Champions

Singles
- Pavel Kotov

Doubles
- (Canada) Cleeve Harper / (United Kingdom) David Stevenson
- Challenger La Manche

The 2026 Challenger La Manche was a professional tennis tournament played on indoor hard courts. It was the 33rd edition of the tournament which was part of the 2026 ATP Challenger Tour. It took place in Cherbourg, France between 9 and 15 March 2026.

== Singles main-draw entrants ==
=== Seeds ===
Country	Player	Rank^{1}	Seed
NOR	Nicolai Budkov Kjær	150	1
FRA	Pierre-Hugues Herbert	157	2
~~JPN~~	~~Yosuke Watanuki~~	~~175~~	~~3~~
EST	Daniil Glinka	176	4
AUT	Jurij Rodionov	177	5
FRA	Clément Chidekh	187	6
FRA	Clément Tabur	190	7
CRO	Borna Gojo	194	8

- ^{1} Rankings are as of 2 March 2026.

=== Other entrants ===
The following players received wildcards into the singles main draw:

- (France) Thomas Faurel
- (France) Sascha Gueymard Wayenburg
- (France) Laurent Lokoli

The following player received entry into the singles main draw as an alternate:

- (France) Raphael Perot

The following players received entry from the qualifying draw:

- (United Kingdom) Patrick Brady
- (France) Antoine Ghibaudo
- (France) Maxime Janvier
- (France) Lucas Poullain
- (Italy) Filippo Romano
- (Netherlands) Niels Visker

The following player received entry as a lucky loser:

- (Luxembourg) Alex Knaff

== Champions ==
=== Singles ===
- Pavel Kotov def. (Italy) Filippo Romano 6–2, 7–5.

=== Doubles ===
- (Canada) Cleeve Harper / (United Kingdom) David Stevenson def. (Poland) Karol Drzewiecki / (Poland) Szymon Walków 4–6, 6–3, [10–8].
