= 2026 Internazionali di Tennis Città di Todi – Singles =

Singles
- 2026 Internazionali di Tennis Città di Todi

Final
- Champion: (Czech Republic) Maxim Mrva
- Runner-up: (Argentina) Nicolás Kicker
- Score: 6–2, 6–2

Events
Singles	Doubles
- Internazionali di Tennis Città di Todi

Timofey Skatov was the defending champion but chose not to defend his title.

Maxim Mrva won the title after defeating Nicolás Kicker 6–2, 6–2 in the final.

== Seeds ==
1. (Italy) Stefano Travaglia (first round, retired)
2. (Austria) Lukas Neumayer (quarterfinals, retired)
3. (Italy) Marco Cecchinato (semifinals)
4. (Argentina) Federico Agustín Gómez (quarterfinals, retired)
5. (Spain) Nikolás Sánchez Izquierdo (second round)
6. (Italy) Francesco Passaro (quarterfinals)
7. (Argentina) Alex Barrena (semifinals)
8. (Argentina) Juan Bautista Torres (quarterfinals)

== Draw ==
Key

- Q = Qualifier
- WC = Wild card
- LL = Lucky loser
- Alt = Alternate
- ITF = ITF entry
- PR = Protected ranking
- SR = Special ranking
- SE = Special exempt
- JE = Junior exempt
- JR = Junior Accelerator Programme entrant
- CO = College Accelerator Programme entrant
- NG = Next Gen Accelerator Program entrant
- w/o = Walkover
- r = Retired
- d = Defaulted

=== Finals ===
Semifinals
Alt	(Argentina) Nicolás Kicker	6	4	6
3	(Italy) Marco Cecchinato	4	6	2
(Czech Republic) Maxim Mrva	6	6
7	(Argentina) Alex Barrena	3	2

Final
Alt	(Argentina) Nicolás Kicker	2	2
(Czech Republic) Maxim Mrva	6	6

=== Top half ===
First round
1	(Italy) S Travaglia	6	4	0^{r}
Alt	(Argentina) N Kicker	0	6	4
(Argentina) F Mena	6^{2}	2
(France) T Faurel	7^{7}	6
(Spain) O Roca Batalla	6	6
Q	(Ukraine) N Mashtakov	2	4
Q	(Italy) CA Caniato	6	4	4
6	(Italy) F Passaro	4	6	6
3	(Italy) M Cecchinato	6	7
(Dominican Republic) N Hardt	3	5
WC	(Italy) F Forti	3	6	6
Q	(Italy) Michele Mecarelli	6	2	4
(Italy) F Romano	6	6
WC	(Italy) Massimo Giunta	2	2
(Italy) E Dalla Valle	6^{2}	0^{r}
8	(Argentina) JB Torres	7^{7}	4

Second round
Alt	(Argentina) N Kicker	6	6
(France) T Faurel	4	4
(Spain) O Roca Batalla	4	1
6	(Italy) F Passaro	6	6
3	(Italy) M Cecchinato	6	6
WC	(Italy) F Forti	1	3
(Italy) F Romano	2	6	6^{3}
8	(Argentina) JB Torres	6	2	7^{7}

Quarterfinals
Alt	(Argentina) N Kicker	6	6
6	(Italy) F Passaro	4	1
3	(Italy) M Cecchinato	6	6
8	(Argentina) JB Torres	4	4

Semifinals
Alt	(Argentina) N Kicker	6	4	6
3	(Italy) M Cecchinato	4	6	2

=== Bottom half ===
First round
5	(Spain) N Sánchez Izquierdo	6	6
SE	(Italy) G Piraino	2	2
(Czech Republic) M Mrva	6	1	7
WC	(Italy) Pierluigi Basile	4	6	5
(Bolivia) M Dellien	4	2
(Colombia) DE Galán	6	6
LL	(Italy) Juan Cruz Martin Manzano	1	4
4	(Argentina) FA Gómez	6	6
7	(Argentina) A Barrena	6	6
Q	(Ukraine) G Kravchenko	4	4
(Argentina) LE Ambrogi	3	7^{7}	6
(Croatia) D Ajduković	6	6^{3}	2
(Poland) D Michalski	6	6
Q	(Italy) Lorenzo Carboni	0	3
Q	(Italy) Alexander Weis	2	4
2	(Austria) L Neumayer	6	6

Second round
5	(Spain) N Sánchez Izquierdo	6	4	4
(Czech Republic) M Mrva	3	6	6
(Colombia) DE Galán	5	4
4	(Argentina) FA Gómez	7	6
7	(Argentina) A Barrena	6	6
(Argentina) LE Ambrogi	2	3
(Poland) D Michalski	6	5	0
2	(Austria) L Neumayer	4	7	6

Quarterfinals
(Czech Republic) M Mrva	6	4
4	(Argentina) FA Gómez	2	2^{r}
7	(Argentina) A Barrena	5
2	(Austria) L Neumayer	1^{r}

Semifinals
(Czech Republic) M Mrva	6	6
7	(Argentina) A Barrena	3	2
