= 2025 Clube Tenis Porto Challenger =

- Date: 25 August – 1 September
- Edition: 2nd
- Surface: Clay
- Location: Porto, Portugal

Champions

Singles
- (Netherlands) Guy den Ouden

Doubles
- (Poland) Szymon Kielan / (Poland) Filip Pieczonka
- Clube Tenis Porto Challenger

The 2025 CT Porto Cup was a professional tennis tournament played on clay courts. It was the second edition of the tournament which was part of the 2025 ATP Challenger Tour. It took place in Porto, Portugal between 25 August and 1 September 2025.

== Singles main-draw entrants ==
=== Seeds ===
Country	Player	Rank^{1}	Seed
BRA	Thiago Seyboth Wild	140	1
NED	Guy den Ouden	157	2
POR	Henrique Rocha	168	3
ARG	Alex Barrena	229	4
SWE	Elias Ymer	233	5
KAZ	Dmitry Popko	239	6
ARG	Genaro Alberto Olivieri	259	7
POR	Frederico Ferreira Silva	262	8

- ^{1} Rankings are as of 18 August 2025.

=== Other entrants ===
The following players received wildcards into the singles main draw:

- (Portugal) Pedro Araújo
- (Portugal) Francisco Rocha
- (Portugal) Henrique Rocha

The following player received entry into the singles main draw through the Next Gen Accelerator programme:

- (Belgium) Gilles-Arnaud Bailly

The following players received entry into the singles main draw as alternates:

- (Mexico) Alex Hernández
- (Czech Republic) Maxim Mrva
- (Latvia) Robert Strombachs

The following players received entry from the qualifying draw:

- (Spain) Max Alcalá Gurri
- (Spain) David Jordà Sanchis
- (United States) Maxwell McKennon
- (Poland) Filip Pieczonka
- (Portugal) Tiago Torres
- (Sweden) Olle Wallin

== Champions ==
=== Singles ===
- (Netherlands) Guy den Ouden def. (Belgium) Gilles-Arnaud Bailly 6–4, 6–2.

=== Doubles ===
- (Poland) Szymon Kielan / (Poland) Filip Pieczonka def. (Serbia) Ivan Sabanov / (Serbia) Matej Sabanov 6–2, 6–4.
