= CT Porto Cup =

- 2026 CT Porto Cup

ATP Challenger Tour
- Location: Porto, Portugal
- Venue: Clube de Ténis do Porto
- Category: ATP Challenger Tour
- Surface: Clay
- Prize money: €91,250 (2025), €74,825 (2024)
- Website: Website

The CT Porto Cup (also known as the CT Porto Challenger) is a professional tennis tournament played on clay courts. It is currently part of the ATP Challenger Tour. It was first held in Porto, Portugal in 2024.

== Past finals ==
=== Singles ===
Year	Champion	Runner-up	Score
2026	(Argentina) Facundo Mena	(Bolivia) Hugo Dellien	7–6^{(7–4)}, 6–4
2025	(Netherlands) Guy den Ouden	(Belgium) Gilles-Arnaud Bailly	6–4, 6–2
2024	(Bulgaria) Adrian Andreev	(Spain) Carlos Taberner	6–3, 6–0

=== Doubles ===
Year	Champions	Runners-up	Score
2026	(Spain) Sergio Martos Gornés (Poland) Szymon Walków	(Spain) Pedro Vives Marcos (Spain) Benjamín Winter López	6–4, 4–6, [10–5]
2025	(Poland) Szymon Kielan (Poland) Filip Pieczonka	(Serbia) Ivan Sabanov (Serbia) Matej Sabanov	6–2, 6–4
2024	(Israel) Daniel Cukierman (Poland) Piotr Matuszewski	(Monaco) Romain Arneodo (France) Théo Arribagé	6–4, 6–0
