= Benjamín Winter López =

Spanish tennis player (born 1998)

- Country (sports): Spain
- Born: 27 May 1998 (age 28) Edinburgh, Scotland
- Height: 1.80 m (5 ft 11 in)
- Plays: Right-handed (two-handed backhand)
- Prize money: US $133,471

Singles
- Career record: 0–0 (at ATP Tour level, Grand Slam level, and in Davis Cup)
- Career titles: 0
- Highest ranking: No. 619 (1 August 2022)
- Current ranking: No. 1,428 (26 October 2026)

Doubles
- Career record: 1–1 (at ATP Tour level, Grand Slam level, and in Davis Cup)
- Career titles: 0
- Highest ranking: No. 111 (26 October 2026)
- Current ranking: No. 111 (26 October 2026)
- Last updated on: 26 October 2026.

Benjamín Winter López (born 27 May 1998) is a Scottish-born Spanish tennis player. Winter López has a career high ATP singles ranking of No. 619 achieved on 1 August 2022 and a career high ATP doubles ranking of No. 111 achieved on 26 October 2026.

In April 2026, Winter López received a wildcard into the Mutua Madrid Open, where he recorded his first ATP Tour-level win.

== ATP Challenger Tour finals ==
=== Doubles: 8 (3 titles, 5 runner-up) ===
Legend ATP Challenger Tour (3–5)	Finals by surface Hard (2–1) Clay (1–4)

Result	W–L	Date	Tournament	Tier	Surface	Partner	Opponents	Score
Loss	0–1	Feb 2026	Tenerife Challenger, Spain	Challenger	Hard	(Spain) Pablo Llamas Ruiz	(Jordan) Abdullah Shelbayh (Spain) David Vega Hernández	2–6, 4–6
Win	1–1	Jul 2026	Open de Tenis Ciudad de Pozoblanco, Spain	Challenger	Hard	(Spain) Alejo Sánchez Quílez	(Turkey) Arda Azkara (Turkey) Yankı Erel	6–2, 7–5
Win	2–1	Jul 2026	Open Castilla y León, Spain	Challenger	Hard	(Spain) Alejo Sánchez Quílez	(Turkey) Arda Azkara (Turkey) Yankı Erel	2–6, 7–6^{(7–2)}, [10–7]
Loss	2–2	Aug 2026	Internazionali di Tennis Città di Todi, Italy	Challenger	Clay	(Spain) Mario Mansilla Díez	(France) Arthur Reymond (France) Luca Sanchez	2–6, 4–6
Loss	2–3	Aug 2026	CT Porto Cup, Portugal	Challenger	Clay	(Spain) Pedro Vives Marcos	(Spain) Sergio Martos Gornés (Poland) Szymon Walków	4–6, 6–4, [5–10]
Loss	2–4	Sep 2026	Plovdiv Challenger, Bulgaria	Challenger	Clay	(Romania) Bogdan Pavel	(Slovakia) Miloš Karol (Czech Republic) Andrew Paulson	3–6, 4–6
Loss	2–5	Oct 2026	Maia Challenger, Portugal	Challenger	Clay (i)	(Portugal) Tiago Pereira	(Slovakia) Miloš Karol (Czech Republic) Andrew Paulson	6–4, 1–6, [9–11]
Win	3–5	Oct 2026	Lisboa Belém Open, Portugal	Challenger	Clay	(Portugal) Tiago Pereira	(Poland) Karol Drzewiecki (Poland) Piotr Matuszewski	4–6, 6–3, [10–5]
