= Adrian Andreev =

Bulgarian tennis player (born 2001)

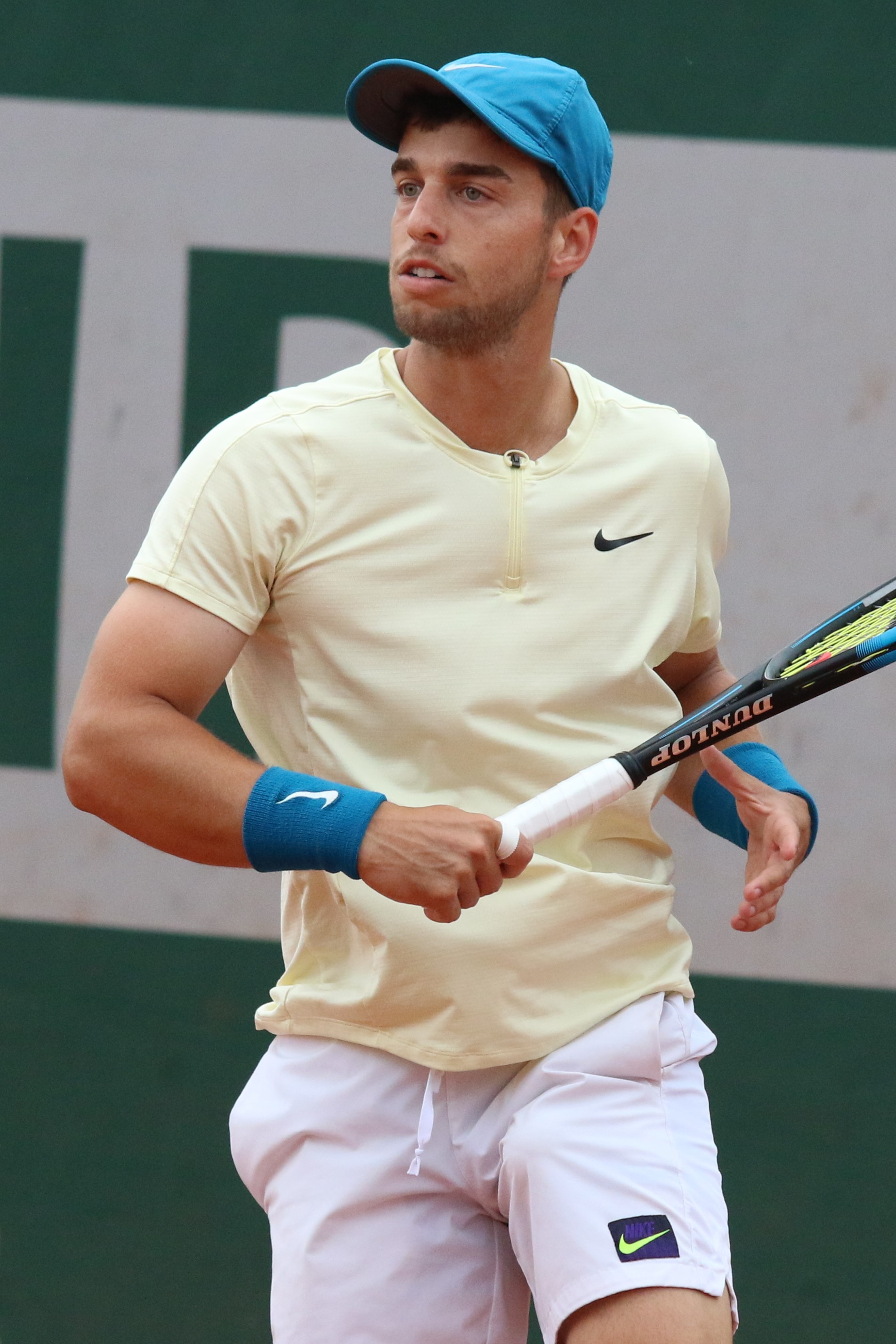
- Andreev at the 2023 French Open
- Country (sports): Bulgaria
- Born: 12 May 2001 (age 25) Sofia, Bulgaria
- Height: 1.80 m (5 ft 11 in)
- Turned pro: 2016
- Plays: Right-handed (two-handed backhand)
- Prize money: US $568,489

Singles
- Career record: 3–7 (at ATP Tour level, Grand Slam level, and in Davis Cup)
- Career titles: 0
- Highest ranking: No. 183 (18 September 2023)
- Current ranking: No. 545 (16 November 2026)

Grand Slam singles results
- Australian Open: Q3 (2023)
- French Open: Q3 (2023)
- Wimbledon: Q1 (2023, 2024)
- US Open: Q2 (2023)

Doubles
- Career record: 0–3 (at ATP Tour level, Grand Slam level, and in Davis Cup)
- Career titles: 0
- Highest ranking: No. 584 (12 September 2022)
- Current ranking: No. 2,442 (19 October 2026)

Grand Slam doubles results
- US Open Junior: W (2018)
Medal record
Men's tennis
Representing Bulgaria
Summer Youth Olympics
Silver medal – second place	2018 Buenos Aires	Doubles
- Last updated on: 15 November 2026.

Adrian Andreev (Bulgarian: Адриан Андреев, born 12 May 2001) is a Bulgarian professional tennis player, who competes mainly on the ATP Challenger Tour. He has a career-high ATP singles ranking of World No. 183 achieved on 18 September 2023 and a doubles ranking of No. 584 achieved on 12 September 2022. He won the 2018 US Open Junior doubles title with Anton Matusevich. He reached a career-high ITF Junior singles ranking of world No. 2 on 31 December 2018.

== Junior career ==
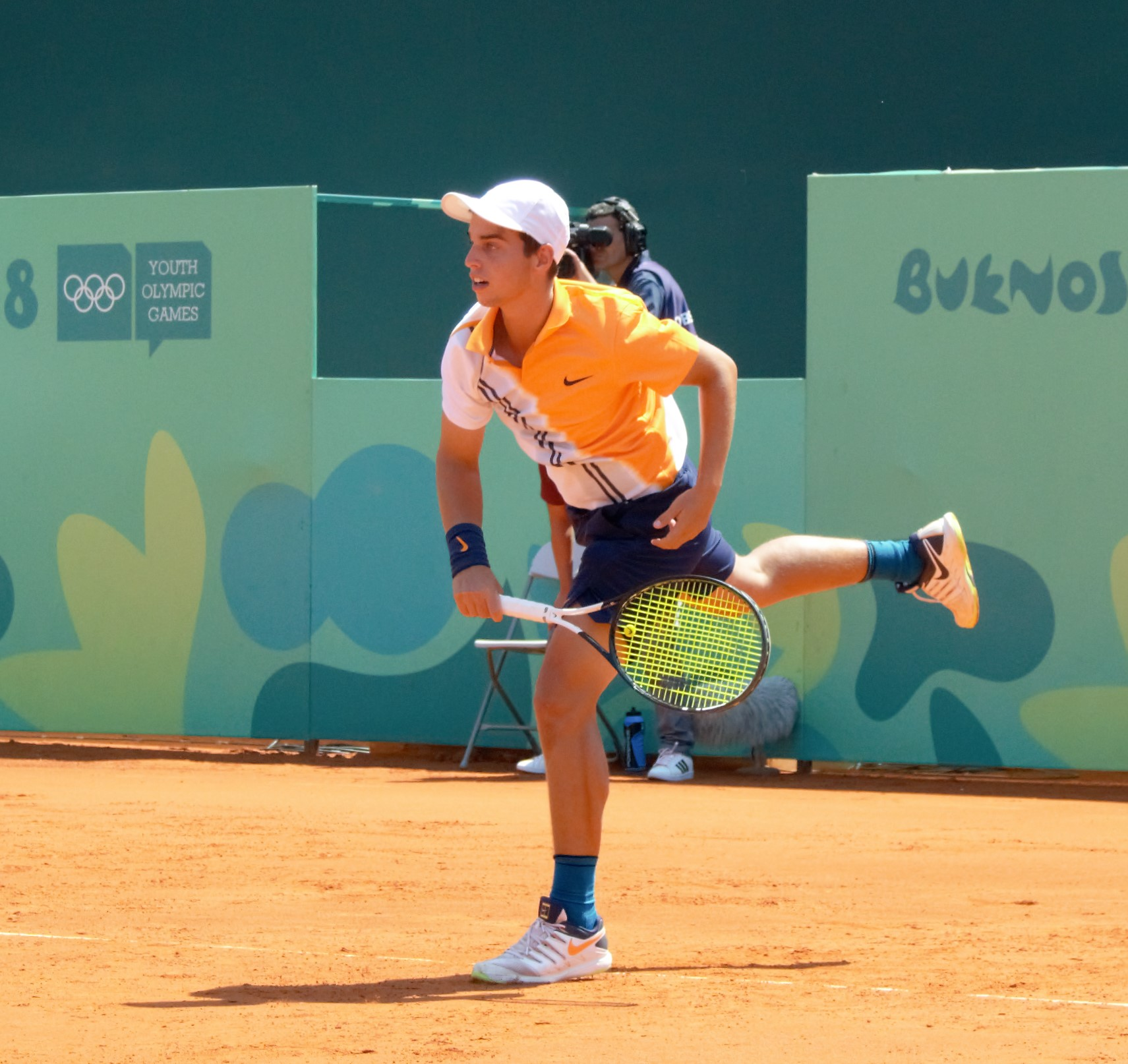
Andreev at the doubles final of the 2018 Summer Youth Olympics.

Andreev won the 2017 Eddie Herr Junior Championships ITF tournament both in singles and in doubles.

In 2018, Andreev won the Junior title at the US Open in doubles with Anton Matusevich, becoming the second Bulgarian to win the US Open after Grigor Dimitrov in 2008 Singles. In October 2018, Andreev reached the semifinals in singles at the 2018 Summer Youth Olympics and the final in doubles winning the silver, teaming with Australia's Rinky Hijikata.

In 2018, Andreev also won the bronze medal of the end-of-year junior competition, the ITF Junior Masters.

== Professional career ==
=== 2016–2020: Turning Pro, ATP debut ===
Andreev made his debut at ATP level at the age of 15, when he received a wildcard for the qualifications of the 2016 Moselle Open, where he lost to Michael Berrer.

Andreev played as a wildcard at the 2017 Sofia Open in his homeland for the first time, losing in two sets to Maximilian Marterer in the qualifications.

The following year, Andreev received another wildcard, this time for the main draw of the 2018 Sofia Open event, but lost to Denis Istomin. The 17-year old Bulgarian became the first player born in 2001 to play in the main draw of the ATP World Tour.

In the 2019 Sofia Open, Andreev was granted another wildcard for the main draw. The Bulgarian pushed world No. 45 Matthew Ebden to three sets, but ultimately lost in the third set tie-break.

A year later Andreev received another wildcard for the main draw at the 2020 Sofia Open, but could not go past world No. 38 and sixth seed John Millman.

=== 2021: First ATP win, top 400 debut ===
At the beginning of the season, Andreev qualified for the main draw of the Antalya Open and managed to record his first ATP win defeating Marsel İlhan in straight sets before he lost to the eventual champion Alex de Minaur in the second round. Andreev recorded his first Top 100 win at the Singapore Open, where he defeated world No. 82 Lloyd Harris before losing out to the eventual champion Alexei Popyrin in the second round. As a result, Andreev climbed to a high-career No. 382 in the ATP rankings.

At the 2021 Sofia Open Andreev lost to world No. 62 Miomir Kecmanović after receiving a fourth consecutive year wildcard into the main draw.

=== 2022: Three Challenger semifinals, Top 200, Bulgarian No. 2 ===
In January, Andreev reached his first Challenger semifinal as a qualifier at the 2022 Città di Forlì II where he lost to third seed Jay Clarke. In April, he also reached the quarterfinals at the 2022 Sarasota Open but retired against fifth seed and eventual champion Daniel Elahi Galán.

In the following months he also reached the round of 16 in four Challengers in Coquimbo, Colombia in May, and as a qualifier in Orlando, Florida in June, in Amersfoot, Netherlands in July and in Meerbusch, Germany in August where he lost to third seed Andrea Collarini, third seed Christopher Eubanks, second seed & eventual runner-up world No. 81 Roberto Carballés Baena and Damir Džumhur respectively.

In August, Andreev reached his first Challenger final in doubles at the IBG Prague Open, playing alongside Murkel Dellien, but the Bulgarian-Bolivian duo lost in the title match to Victor Vlad Cornea and Andrew Paulson.

The Bulgarian's third Challenger quarterfinal showing came at the Open de Rennes tournament in September, where in the round of 16 Andreev scored his second Top 100 win, overcoming the world No. 95 and third seed Hugo Grenier after a third set tiebreak. In the quarterfinals, he faced the 2020 US Open champion and former world No. 3 Dominic Thiem, but failed to score another upset, losing out in three sets to the Austrian.

Ranked No. 309 at the AON Open Challenger in Genoa, he entered the main draw as an alternate and started his campaign with a win over former top-100 player Salvatore Caruso. In the second round, Andreev scored a big upset over world No. 64 and third seed Corentin Moutet, saving three match points for his third Top 100 win of his career to reach his fourth quarterfinal of the season. With his next straight sets win over Raúl Brancaccio, he reached his second Challenger semifinal and the top 250, climbing more than 60 positions in the rankings. There he lost to second seed and eventual champion Thiago Monteiro. Thanks to his successful run in Genoa, he rose to a new career-high of No. 247 on 26 September 2022.

He received a special exemption for his next Challenger, the 2022 Open d'Orléans, where he reached again the quarterfinals, for the fifth time in the season, defeating Ramkumar Ramanathan and again Corentin Moutet, who this time was the top seed, in three tight sets in a three hours match. Next he defeated world No. 98 and sixth seed Norbert Gombos, his fourth top-100 win in a month, to reach his third Challenger semifinal. He lost to fourth seed Quentin Halys. As a result, Andreev climbed close to 40 positions in the rankings to world No. 211 on 3 October 2022. The following week at the 2022 Saint-Tropez Open he entered as a lucky loser but lost in the first round to Stefano Travaglia.

At the 2022 HPP Open in Helsinki, he reached the quarterfinals as an alternate defeating Jay Clarke and Mattia Bellucci. As a result, he moved 13 positions up to a new year-end career-high of No. 207 on 21 November 2022. The next day he further reached the top 200 with a round of 16 showing at the Challenger 2022 Copa Faulcombridge in Valencia with a win over sixth seed Timofey Skatov. The day after he was confirmed as a participant at the 2023 United Cup as part of the Bulgarian team. He reached another quarterfinal defeating Ivan Gakhov. He lost to Serbian Nikola Milojevic in a close three set match despite winning the first set with a bagel at 6–0. He reached a new career-high singles ranking of No. 197 moving 10 positions up on 28 November 2022 making him the Bulgarian male player No. 2 in the rankings ahead of Dimitar Kuzmanov. He reached another quarterfinal at the 2022 Maspalomas Challenger but he withdrew from the match due to injury against another Serbian Dušan Lajović. He moved to No. 193 in the singles rankings ending his season on 2 December 2022.

=== 2023: United Cup debut, First Grand Slam qualifications ===
He made his 2023 United Cup debut in the mixed doubles match alongside Gergana Topalova where they lost to the top seeded team of Maria Sakkari and Stefanos Tsitsipas. At the 2023 Australian Open qualifications, he defeated Francesco Maestrelli, and 15th seed Jurij Rodionov but fell to 20th seed Zizou Bergs in the final round. He regained the Bulgarian No. 2 ranking on 20 February 2023.

He reached also the third round of qualifying at the 2023 French Open but lost to Major debutant Genaro Alberto Olivieri. He lost in the first round and second rounds of qualifying at Wimbledon and at the US Open falling to Michael Mmoh and Borna Gojo respectively.

=== 2024–2026: Maiden ATP Challenger title, hiatus, back to Tour ===
At the 2024 Zadar Open, Andreev reached his maiden Challenger final defeating Manuel Guinard, wildcard Matej Dodig, Enrico Dalla Valle and Timofey Skatov. He lost to Jozef Kovalík in the final. As a result, he returned to the top 230 in the rankings on 8 April 2024.

In August 2024, Andreev won his maiden title at the CT Porto Challenger, defeating fourth seed Carlos Taberner in the final. He became the sixth Bulgarian to win a challenger title. As a result, he returned to the top 205 in the rankings on 9 September 2024.

== Grand Slam performance timeline ==
Key
W	F	SF	QF	#R	RR	Q#	P#	DNQ	A	Z#	PO	G	S	B	NMS	NTI	P	NH

(W) winner; (F) finalist; (SF) semifinalist; (QF) quarterfinalist; (#R) rounds 4, 3, 2, 1; (RR) round-robin stage; (Q#) qualification round; (P#) preliminary round; (DNQ) did not qualify; (A) absent; (Z#) Davis/Fed Cup Zonal Group (with number indication) or (PO) play-off; (G) gold, (S) silver or (B) bronze Olympic/Paralympic medal; (NMS) not a Masters tournament; (NTI) not a Tier I tournament; (P) postponed; (NH) not held; (SR) strike rate (events won / competed); (W–L) win–loss record.
To avoid confusion and double counting, these charts are updated at the conclusion of a tournament or when the player's participation has ended.

=== Singles ===
Tournament	2020	2021	2022	2023	2024	2025	W–L
Australian Open	A	A	A	Q3	A	Q1	0–0
French Open	A	A	A	Q3	Q2	A	0–0
Wimbledon	NH	A	A	Q1	Q1	A	0–0
US Open	A	A	A	Q2	A	A	0–0
Win–loss	0–0	0–0	0–0	0–0	0–0		0–0

== Year-end ATP ranking ==
Year	2016	2017	2018	2019	2020	2021	2022	2023	2024	2025	2026
Singles	1759	1766	-	658	561	365	189	265	217	867	545
Doubles	-	-	-	1611	1680	970	609	833	808	-	

== ATP Challenger and ITF Tour finals ==
=== Singles: 8 (3 titles, 5 runner-ups) ===
Legend ATP Challenger Tour (1–1) ITF WTT (2–4)	Finals by surface Hard (1–2) Clay (2–3) Grass (0–0) Carpet (0–0)

Result	W–L	Date	Tournament	Tier	Surface	Opponent	Score
Loss	0–1	Sep 2019	M25 Harlingen, USA	WTT	Hard	(United States) Govind Nanda	4–6, 4–6
Loss	0–2	Nov 2020	M15 Heraklion, Greece	WTT	Hard	(Brazil) Mateus Alves	6–7^{(6–8)}, 4–6
Win	1–2	Nov 2020	M15 Heraklion, Greece	WTT	Hard	(Czech Republic) Jiří Lehečka	6–3, 6–4
Win	2–2	Jan 2021	M15 Antalya, Turkey	WTT	Clay	(Russia) Alexander Shevchenko	6–1, 7–6^{(7–1)}
Loss	2–3	May 2021	M15 Antalya, Turkey	WTT	Clay	(Austria) Alexander Erler	4–6, 1–6
Loss	2–4	May 2021	M25 Pensacola, USA	WTT	Clay	(Argentina) Nicolás Kicker	7–6^{(7–4)}, 3–6, 2–6
Loss	2–5	Mar 2024	Zadar, Croatia	Challenger	Clay	(Slovenia) Jozef Kovalík	4–6, 2–6
Win	3–5	Sep 2024	Porto, Portugal	Challenger	Clay	(Spain) Carlos Taberner	6–3, 6–0

=== Doubles: 1 (1 runner-up) ===
Legend ATP Challenger Tour (0–1)

Result	W–L	Date	Tournament	Tier	Surface	Partner	Opponents	Score
Loss	0–1	Aug 2022	Prague, Czech Republic	Challenger	Clay	(Bolivia) Murkel Dellien	(Romania) Victor Vlad Cornea (Czech Republic) Andrew Paulson	3–6, 1–6

== National participation ==
=== Davis Cup (3 wins, 2 losses) ===
Adrian Andreev debuted for the Bulgaria Davis Cup team in 2018. Since then he has 5 nominations with 5 ties played, his singles W/L record is 2–1 and doubles W/L record is 1–1 (3–2 overall).

Group membership World Group (0–0) WG Play-off (0–0) Group I (1–0) Group II (0–2) Group III (2–0) Group IV (0–0)	Matches by surface Hard (1–2) Clay (2–0) Grass (0–0) Carpet (0–0)	Matches by type Singles (2–1) Doubles (1–1)

- ▲ ▼ indicates the result of the Davis Cup match followed by the score, date, place of event, the zonal classification and its phase, and the court surface.

Rubber result	No.	Rubber	Match type (partner if any)	Opponent nation	Opponent player(s)	Score
▲3–0; 4 April 2018; Tennis Club Lokomotiv, Plovdiv, Bulgaria; Group III Europe round robin; Clay surface
Victory	1	I	Singles	Albania	Mario Zili	6–1, 6–0
▲3–0; 6 April 2018; Tennis Club Lokomotiv, Plovdiv, Bulgaria; Group III Europe round robin; Clay surface
Victory	2	III	Doubles (with Vasko Mladenov)	(North Macedonia) Macedonia	Stefan Micov / Gorazd Srbljak	6–4, 6–3
▲4–1; 6–7 March 2020; Costa Rica Country Club, San José, Costa Rica; World Group II Play-Off; Hard surface
Defeat	3	III	Doubles (with Alexandar Lazarov)	Costa Rica	Jesse Flores / Pablo Núñez	6–7^{(9–11)}, 6–4, 6–7^{(10–12)}
▼1–3; 5–6 March 2021; Sport Hall Sofia, Sofia, Bulgaria; World Group II; Hard (i)surface
Defeat	4	II	Singles	Mexico	Miguel Ángel Reyes-Varela	6–3, 1–6, 2–6
▲3–1; 31 January–1 February 2025; Polyvalent Hall, Craiova, Romania; World Group I Play-Off; Hard (i) surface
Victory	5	IV	Singles	Romania	Filip Cristian Jianu	6–3, 3–6, 6–3

=== United Cup (0 wins, 1 loss) ===
Matches by type
Singles (0–0)
Doubles (0–1)

Result	No.	Rubber	Match type (partner if any)	Opponent nation	Opponent player(s)	Score
▼1–4; 29–30 December 2022; Perth Arena, Perth, Australia; Group stage; Hard surface
Defeat	1	V	Doubles (with Gergana Topalova)	Greece	Stefanos Tsitsipas / Maria Sakkari	4–6, 4–6

== Junior Grand Slam finals ==
=== Doubles: 1 (1 title) ===
Result	Year	Tournament	Surface	Partner	Opponents	Score
Win	2018	US Open	Hard	(United Kingdom) Anton Matusevich	(United States) Emilio Nava (United States) Axel Nefve	6–2, 2–6, [10–8]
