= Gilles-Arnaud Bailly =

Belgian tennis player (born 2005)

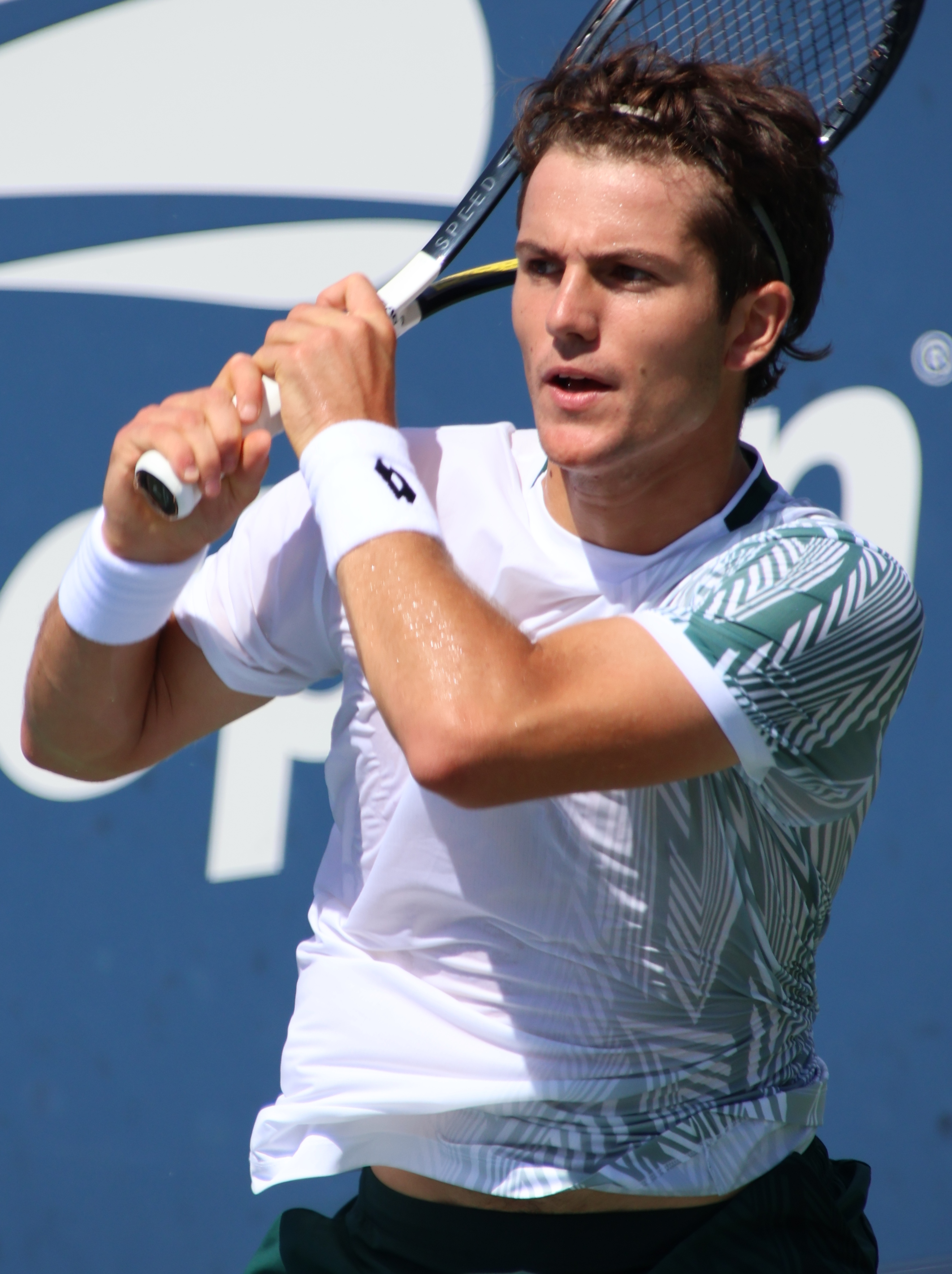
- Bailly at the 2026 US Open
- Country (sports): Belgium
- Born: 19 September 2005 (age 20) Hasselt, Belgium
- Height: 1.80 m (5 ft 11 in)
- Plays: Right-handed (two-handed backhand)
- Coach: Dries Beerden
- Prize money: US $291,947

Singles
- Career record: 1–3 (at ATP Tour level, Grand Slam level, and in Davis Cup)
- Career titles: 7 ITF
- Highest ranking: No. 201 (10 November 2025)
- Current ranking: No. 317 (14 September 2026)

Grand Slam singles results
- Australian Open: Q3 (2026)
- French Open: Q1 (2026)
- Wimbledon: Q1 (2026)
- US Open: Q1 (2026)

Doubles
- Career record: 0–0 (at ATP Tour level, Grand Slam level, and in Davis Cup)
- Career titles: 0
- Highest ranking: No. 1,723 (27 February 2023)
- Last updated on: 16 September 2026.

Gilles-Arnaud Bailly (born 19 September 2005) is a Belgian professional tennis player. He has a career-high ATP singles ranking of No. 201 achieved on 10 November 2025 and a doubles ranking of No. 1,723, reached on 27 February 2023.

== Junior career ==
Bailly was a runner-up at the 2022 French Open and at the 2022 US Open in the boys' singles category. He reached an ITF junior combined ranking of world No. 1 on 28 November 2022. He became the first Junior player from Belgium to be crowned a world junior champion by the ITF. He had notable results on ITF junior circuit, maintaining a 97–40 singles win-loss record.

== Professional career ==
=== 2022: ATP Tour debut ===
Bailly made his debut at the 2022 European Open where he received a main draw wildcard but lost in the first round to compatriot David Goffin despite playing for more than three hours and winning the second set.

=== 2023-25: First Challenger final and ATP win, top 205 ===
Bailly received another invitation at European Open, for the qualies. The following year, he qualified to the main draw of his home tournament but lost to German Daniel Altmaier.

Ranked No. 247, Bailly qualified again for his home event, that edition hosted in Brussels, and recorded his first ATP Tour win, over the same player, Altmaier, who defeated him the previous year. He lost to third seed Jiří Lehečka in the second round. As a result, he moved into the top 235 in the singles rankings and entered the qualification zone of the NextGen Finals. He eventually made it as a first alternate, having been ranked 11th in the race, following the withdrawal of the two top players.

Bailly finished that year at No. 204 in singles, having reached a career-high of world No. 201 the week before. It was the third-largest rankings climb for the 2025 season - behind Rafael Jódar and Petr Brunclík - raising close to 600 positions.

== Performance timeline ==
Key
W	F	SF	QF	#R	RR	Q#	DNQ	A	NH

(W) winner; (F) finalist; (SF) semifinalist; (QF) quarterfinalist; (#R) rounds 4, 3, 2, 1; (RR) round-robin stage; (Q#) qualification round; (DNQ) did not qualify; (A) absent; (NH) not held; (SR) strike rate (events won / competed); (W–L) win–loss record.

=== Singles ===
Current through the 2026 Australian Open.

Tournament	2026	SR	W–L	Win%
Grand Slam tournaments
Australian Open	Q3	0 / 0	0–0	–
French Open		0 / 0	0–0	–
Wimbledon		0 / 0	0–0	–
US Open		0 / 0	0–0	–
Win–loss	0–0	0 / 0	0–0	–

== ATP Challenger Tour finals ==
Challenger

=== Singles: 1 (runner-up) ===
Result	W–L	Date	Tournament	Surface	Opponent	Score
Loss	0–1	Aug 2025	CT Porto Cup, Portugal	Clay	(Netherlands) Guy den Ouden	4–6, 2–6

== ITF World Tennis Tour finals ==
World Tennis

=== Singles: 12 (7 titles, 5 runner-ups) ===
Finals by surface
Hard (2–2)
Clay (5–3)

Result	W–L	Date	Tournament	Surface	Opponent	Score
Loss	0–1	Mar 2023	M15 Antalya, Turkey	Clay	(Sweden) Dragoș Nicolae Mădăraș	3–6, 1–6
Win	1–1	Mar 2023	M15 Antalya, Turkey	Clay	(Germany) Peter Heller	6–3, 4–6, 7–5
Win	2–1	Sep 2023	M15 Santa Margherita di Pula, Italy	Clay	(Italy) Enrico Dalla Valle	6–1, 6–2
Loss	2–2	Jan 2025	M15 Monastir, Tunisia	Hard	(Tunisia) Moez Echargui	6–3, 4–6, 5–7
Win	3–2	Feb 2025	M15 Monastir, Tunisia	Hard	(Serbia) Branko Djurić	6–4, 6–2
Loss	3–3	Apr 2025	M15 Antalya, Turkey	Clay	(Slovakia) Alex Molčan	0–6, 2–6
Win	4–3	Apr 2025	M15 Oegstgeest, Netherlands	Clay	(Spain) David Jordà Sanchis	7–6^{(7–5)}, 6–2
Win	5–3	Jul 2025	M25 Uriage-les-Bains, France	Clay	Marat Sharipov	6–4, 7–6^{(7–1)}
Loss	5–4	Aug 2025	M25 Koksijde, Belgium	Clay	(France) Lilian Marmousez	6–2, 2–6, 3–6
Win	6–4	Sep 2025	M25 Meerbusch, Germany	Clay	(Netherlands) Max Houkes	6–4, 3–6, 7–6^{(7–5)}
Win	7–4	Oct 2025	M25 Sintra, Portugal	Hard	(Colombia) Adrià Soriano Barrera	3–6, 7–6^{(9–7)}, 6–1
Loss	7–5	Oct 2025	M25 Sintra, Portugal	Hard	(Italy) Carlo Alberto Caniato	5–7, 2–6

== Junior Grand Slam finals ==
=== Singles: 2 (2 runner-ups) ===
Result	Year	Tournament	Surface	Opponent	Score
Loss	2022	French Open	Clay	(France) Gabriel Debru	6–7^{(5–7)}, 3–6
Loss	2022	US Open	Hard	(Spain) Martín Landaluce	6–7^{(3–7)}, 7–5, 2–6

== Awards ==
2022

- ITF Junior World Champion

Awards and achievements
Preceded by (China) Shang Juncheng	ITF Junior World Champion; 2022	Succeeded by (Brazil) João Fonseca
