= Pedro Vives Marcos =

Spanish tennis player

- Country (sports): Spain
- Born: 13 April 2001 (age 25) Palma de Mallorca, Spain
- Height: 1.78 m (5 ft 10 in)
- Plays: Right-handed (two-handed backhand)
- College: TCU
- Coach: Angel Inocencio
- Prize money: US $88,640

Singles
- Career record: 0–0 (at ATP Tour level, Grand Slam level, and in Davis Cup)
- Career titles: 2 ITF
- Highest ranking: No. 463 (10 November 2025)
- Current ranking: No. 542 (5 October 2026)

Doubles
- Career record: 0–1 (at ATP Tour level, Grand Slam level, and in Davis Cup)
- Career titles: 7 ITF
- Highest ranking: No. 345 (5 October 2026)
- Current ranking: No. 345 (5 October 2026)
- Last updated on: 6 October 2026.

Pedro Vives Marcos (born 13 April 2001) is a Spanish tennis player. He has a career-high ATP singles ranking of No. 463 achieved on 10 November 2025, and a doubles ranking of No. 345 achieved on 5 October 2026.

Vives Marcos made his ATP main draw debut at the 2026 Mallorca Championships, after receiving a wildcard for the doubles main draw, partnering with Abdullah Shelbayh.
