= 2022 ITF Men's World Tennis Tour (April–June) =

The 2022 ITF Men's World Tennis Tour is the 2022 edition of the second-tier tour for men's professional tennis. It is organised by the International Tennis Federation and is a tier below the ATP Challenger Tour. The ITF Men's World Tennis Tour includes tournaments with prize money ranging from $15,000 to $25,000.

== Key ==
M25 tournaments
M15 tournaments

== Month ==
=== April ===
Week of	Tournament	Winner	Runners-up	Semifinalists	Quarterfinalists
April 4	Rosario, Argentina; Clay; M25; Singles and Doubles Draws	(Argentina) Gonzalo Villanueva; 3–6, 6–4, 6–1	(Argentina) Franco Emanuel Egea	(Argentina) Román Andrés Burruchaga (Argentina) Alejo Lorenzo Lingua Lavallén	(Argentina) Santiago Rodríguez Taverna (Argentina) Tomás Farjat (Argentina) Leonardo Aboian (Brazil) Eduardo Ribeiro
April 4	Rosario, Argentina; Clay; M25; Singles and Doubles Draws	(Bolivia) Murkel Dellien (Peru) Arklon Huertas del Pino; 6–3, 7–5	(Argentina) Román Andrés Burruchaga (Argentina) Juan Ignacio Galarza	(Argentina) Román Andrés Burruchaga (Argentina) Alejo Lorenzo Lingua Lavallén	(Argentina) Santiago Rodríguez Taverna (Argentina) Tomás Farjat (Argentina) Leonardo Aboian (Brazil) Eduardo Ribeiro
April 4	Reus, Spain; Clay; M25; Singles and Doubles Draws	(Spain) Àlex Martí Pujolràs; 3–6, 6–2, 7–6^{(7–3)}	(France) Ugo Blanchet	(Italy) Filippo Baldi (Spain) Ignasi de Rueda de Genover	(Spain) Iñaki Cabrera Bello (Austria) Lukas Neumayer; Andrey Chepelev (Germany) Peter Heller
April 4	Reus, Spain; Clay; M25; Singles and Doubles Draws	(Germany) Peter Heller (Netherlands) Mark Vervoort; Walkover	(United States) Dali Blanch (Spain) Alejandro Manzanera Pertusa	(Italy) Filippo Baldi (Spain) Ignasi de Rueda de Genover	(Spain) Iñaki Cabrera Bello (Austria) Lukas Neumayer; Andrey Chepelev (Germany) Peter Heller
April 4	Dubrovnik, Croatia; Clay; M15; Singles and Doubles Draws	(Hungary) Gergely Madarász; 6–2, 6–0	(Croatia) Dino Prižmić	(France) Arthur Reymond (Italy) Andrea Guerrieri	Savriyan Danilov (France) Luka Pavlovic (North Macedonia) Gorazd Srbljak (Serbia) Marko Topo
April 4	Dubrovnik, Croatia; Clay; M15; Singles and Doubles Draws	(Croatia) Božo Barun (Croatia) Alen Rogić Hadžalić; 6–4, 5–7, [10–7]	(Bulgaria) Gabriel Donev (Bulgaria) Simon Anthony Ivanov	(France) Arthur Reymond (Italy) Andrea Guerrieri	Savriyan Danilov (France) Luka Pavlovic (North Macedonia) Gorazd Srbljak (Serbia) Marko Topo
April 4	Sharm El Sheikh, Egypt; Hard; M15; Singles and Doubles Draws	Alibek Kachmazov; 6–2, 6–4	(Italy) Samuel Vincent Ruggeri	(Slovakia) Lukáš Pokorný (Sweden) Filip Bergevi	(Germany) Dominik Böhler (Northern Mariana Islands) Colin Sinclair (Georgia (country)) Saba Purtseladze (Egypt) Karim-Mohamed Maamoun
April 4	Sharm El Sheikh, Egypt; Hard; M15; Singles and Doubles Draws	(Italy) Francesco Vilardo (Italy) Samuel Vincent Ruggeri; 6–4, 5–7, [10–8]	(Sweden) Filip Bergevi (Finland) Patrik Niklas-Salminen	(Slovakia) Lukáš Pokorný (Sweden) Filip Bergevi	(Germany) Dominik Böhler (Northern Mariana Islands) Colin Sinclair (Georgia (country)) Saba Purtseladze (Egypt) Karim-Mohamed Maamoun
April 4	Chiang Rai, Thailand; Hard; M15; Singles and Doubles Draws	(South Korea) Nam Ji-sung; 6–2, 6–4	(China) Bai Yan	(South Korea) Hong Seong-chan; Konstantin Kravchuk	(Thailand) Kasidit Samrej (Japan) Taisei Ichikawa (New Zealand) Ajeet Rai (Thailand) Tanapatt Nirundorn
April 4	Chiang Rai, Thailand; Hard; M15; Singles and Doubles Draws	(South Korea) Hong Seong-chan (South Korea) Kim Cheong-eui; 4–6, 7–6^{(7–2)}, [10–8]	(South Korea) Nam Ji-sung (South Korea) Song Min-kyu	(South Korea) Hong Seong-chan; Konstantin Kravchuk	(Thailand) Kasidit Samrej (Japan) Taisei Ichikawa (New Zealand) Ajeet Rai (Thailand) Tanapatt Nirundorn
April 4	Monastir, Tunisia; Hard; M15; Singles and Doubles Draws	(Belgium) Joris De Loore; 6–4, 6–3	(Poland) Szymon Kielan	(France) Maxence Beaugé (France) Térence Atmane	(United Kingdom) Charles Broom (China) Li Zhe (France) Martin Breysach (France) Arthur Bouquier
April 4	Monastir, Tunisia; Hard; M15; Singles and Doubles Draws	(United Kingdom) Charles Broom (Germany) Constantin Frantzen; 7–5, 2–6, [10–8]	(China) Li Zhe (China) Bu Yunchaokete	(France) Maxence Beaugé (France) Térence Atmane	(United Kingdom) Charles Broom (China) Li Zhe (France) Martin Breysach (France) Arthur Bouquier
April 4	Antalya, Turkey; Clay; M15; Singles and Doubles Draws	(Serbia) Hamad Međedović; 6–3, 6–2	(France) Valentin Royer	(Romania) Nicolae Frunză (Japan) Rimpei Kawakami	(Germany) Timo Stodder (Netherlands) Max Houkes (France) Mathys Erhard (Czech Republic) Martin Krumich
April 4	Antalya, Turkey; Clay; M15; Singles and Doubles Draws	(Japan) Rimpei Kawakami (Japan) Gengo Kikuchi; 1–6, 7–6^{(8–6)}, [10–3]	(Japan) Yuki Mochizuki (Japan) Kaito Uesugi	(Romania) Nicolae Frunză (Japan) Rimpei Kawakami	(Germany) Timo Stodder (Netherlands) Max Houkes (France) Mathys Erhard (Czech Republic) Martin Krumich
April 11	Santa Margherita di Pula, Italy; Clay; M25; Singles and Doubles Draws	(France) Laurent Lokoli; 7–5, 6–3	(United Kingdom) Felix Gill	(United Kingdom) Jack Pinnington Jones (Italy) Francesco Maestrelli	(France) Théo Arribagé (France) Dan Added (Italy) Omar Giacalone (Germany) Louis Wessels
April 11	Santa Margherita di Pula, Italy; Clay; M25; Singles and Doubles Draws	(Italy) Omar Giacalone (Italy) Alexander Weis; 6–1, 3–6, [10–6]	(Italy) Matteo Gigante (Italy) Francesco Maestrelli	(United Kingdom) Jack Pinnington Jones (Italy) Francesco Maestrelli	(France) Théo Arribagé (France) Dan Added (Italy) Omar Giacalone (Germany) Louis Wessels
April 11	Nottingham, United Kingdom; Hard; M25; Singles and Doubles Draws	(Japan) Hiroki Moriya; 3–6, 6–0, 6–2	(France) Antoine Escoffier	(Belgium) Ruben Bemelmans (United Kingdom) Billy Harris	(United Kingdom) Henry Patten (United Kingdom) Charles Broom (United Kingdom) Alastair Gray (Poland) Filip Peliwo
April 11	Nottingham, United Kingdom; Hard; M25; Singles and Doubles Draws	(Belgium) Ruben Bemelmans (Belgium) Joris De Loore; 7–5, 7–5	(India) Anirudh Chandrasekar (India) Vijay Sundar Prashanth	(Belgium) Ruben Bemelmans (United Kingdom) Billy Harris	(United Kingdom) Henry Patten (United Kingdom) Charles Broom (United Kingdom) Alastair Gray (Poland) Filip Peliwo
April 11	Cairo, Egypt; Clay; M15; Singles and Doubles Draws	(Argentina) Valerio Aboian; 4–6, 7–6^{(8–6)}, 6–2	(Romania) Cezar Crețu	(Argentina) Lorenzo Joaquín Rodríguez (Lithuania) Vilius Gaubas	(Switzerland) Rémy Bertola (Chile) Amador Salazar (Italy) Simone Roncalli (Sweden) Leo Borg
April 11	Cairo, Egypt; Clay; M15; Singles and Doubles Draws	(Germany) Kai Lemstra (Austria) Neil Oberleitner; 7–6^{(10–8)}, 6–4	(Romania) Cezar Crețu (Ukraine) Volodymyr Uzhylovskyi	(Argentina) Lorenzo Joaquín Rodríguez (Lithuania) Vilius Gaubas	(Switzerland) Rémy Bertola (Chile) Amador Salazar (Italy) Simone Roncalli (Sweden) Leo Borg
April 11	Chiang Rai, Thailand; Hard; M15; Singles and Doubles Draws	(South Korea) Hong Seong-chan; 6–3, 3–6, 7–5	(Vietnam) Lý Hoàng Nam	(New Zealand) Ajeet Rai (South Korea) Nam Ji-sung	(Japan) Shinji Hazawa (Thailand) Kasidit Samrej (India) Sidharth Rawat (Australia) Dayne Kelly
April 11	Chiang Rai, Thailand; Hard; M15; Singles and Doubles Draws	(South Korea) Nam Ji-sung (South Korea) Song Min-kyu; 6–1, 6–4	(Japan) Shinji Hazawa (Japan) Takuto Niki	(New Zealand) Ajeet Rai (South Korea) Nam Ji-sung	(Japan) Shinji Hazawa (Thailand) Kasidit Samrej (India) Sidharth Rawat (Australia) Dayne Kelly
April 11	Monastir, Tunisia; Hard; M15; Singles and Doubles Draws	(Italy) Mattia Bellucci; 7–6^{(7–4)}, 6–3	(Austria) Maximilian Neuchrist	(United States) Kalman Boyd (China) Bu Yunchaokete	(Estonia) Mark Lajal (China) Li Zhe (United States) Gage Brymer (Argentina) Federico Agustín Gómez
April 11	Monastir, Tunisia; Hard; M15; Singles and Doubles Draws	(France) Arthur Bouquier (France) Martin Breysach; 6–2, 6–3	(Argentina) Federico Agustín Gómez; Kirill Kivattsev	(United States) Kalman Boyd (China) Bu Yunchaokete	(Estonia) Mark Lajal (China) Li Zhe (United States) Gage Brymer (Argentina) Federico Agustín Gómez
April 11	Antalya, Turkey; Clay; M15; Singles and Doubles Draws	(France) Mathys Erhard; 6–4, 6–1	(Moldova) Ilya Snițari	(Turkey) Yankı Erel (Ukraine) Oleg Prihodko	(Italy) Davide Galoppini (France) Gabriel Debru (Switzerland) Damien Wenger (Romania) David Ionel
April 11	Antalya, Turkey; Clay; M15; Singles and Doubles Draws	(Japan) Yuki Mochizuki (Japan) Kaito Uesugi; 6–4, 6–4	(Switzerland) Nicolás Parizzia (Switzerland) Damien Wenger	(Turkey) Yankı Erel (Ukraine) Oleg Prihodko	(Italy) Davide Galoppini (France) Gabriel Debru (Switzerland) Damien Wenger (Romania) David Ionel
April 11	Sunrise, United States; Clay; M15; Singles and Doubles Draws	(United States) Sekou Bangoura; 6–4, 6–2	(United States) Evan Zhu	(United States) Kyle Kang (Brazil) José Pereira	(United States) Bruno Kuzuhara (United States) Nathan Ponwith (Ecuador) Antonio Cayetano March (Dominican Republic) Peter Bertran
April 11	Sunrise, United States; Clay; M15; Singles and Doubles Draws	(Moldova) Alexander Cozbinov (South Africa) Ruan Roelofse; 6–4, 6–4	(Netherlands) Alec Deckers (Luxembourg) Alex Knaff	(United States) Kyle Kang (Brazil) José Pereira	(United States) Bruno Kuzuhara (United States) Nathan Ponwith (Ecuador) Antonio Cayetano March (Dominican Republic) Peter Bertran
April 18	Angers, France; Clay (indoor); M25; Singles and Doubles Draws	(France) Titouan Droguet; 6–1, 6–1	(Monaco) Lucas Catarina	(France) Sascha Gueymard Wayenburg (France) Jurgen Briand	(Republic of Ireland) Simon Carr (France) Paul Inchauspé (Brazil) Oscar José Gutierrez (Spain) Álvaro López San Martín
April 18	Angers, France; Clay (indoor); M25; Singles and Doubles Draws	(France) Titouan Droguet (France) Sascha Gueymard Wayenburg; 6–3, 4–6, [10–3]	(France) Lucas Bouquet (France) Alexis Musialek	(France) Sascha Gueymard Wayenburg (France) Jurgen Briand	(Republic of Ireland) Simon Carr (France) Paul Inchauspé (Brazil) Oscar José Gutierrez (Spain) Álvaro López San Martín
April 18	Santa Margherita di Pula, Italy; Clay; M25; Singles and Doubles Draws	(Italy) Francesco Maestrelli; 6–1, 6–3	(Italy) Edoardo Lavagno	(Italy) Alexander Weis (Italy) Gabriele Piraino	(Ukraine) Oleksandr Ovcharenko (Italy) Filippo Baldi (United Kingdom) Felix Gill (Italy) Stefano Napolitano
April 18	Santa Margherita di Pula, Italy; Clay; M25; Singles and Doubles Draws	(Italy) Edoardo Lavagno (Italy) Giorgio Ricca; 7–6^{(7–3)}, 6–4	(Italy) Federico Arnaboldi (Italy) Gianmarco Ferrari	(Italy) Alexander Weis (Italy) Gabriele Piraino	(Ukraine) Oleksandr Ovcharenko (Italy) Filippo Baldi (United Kingdom) Felix Gill (Italy) Stefano Napolitano
April 18	Nottingham, United Kingdom; Hard; M25; Singles and Doubles Draws	(United States) Brandon Holt; 7–6^{(7–2)}, 7–5	(United Kingdom) Henry Patten	(Poland) Filip Peliwo (United Kingdom) Oscar Weightman	(Japan) Hiroki Moriya (Italy) Luca Potenza (United Kingdom) Stuart Parker (Austria) Maximilian Neuchrist
April 18	Nottingham, United Kingdom; Hard; M25; Singles and Doubles Draws	(United Kingdom) Julian Cash (United Kingdom) Henry Patten; 6–1, 6–4	(India) Anirudh Chandrasekar (India) Vijay Sundar Prashanth	(Poland) Filip Peliwo (United Kingdom) Oscar Weightman	(Japan) Hiroki Moriya (Italy) Luca Potenza (United Kingdom) Stuart Parker (Austria) Maximilian Neuchrist
April 18	Cairo, Egypt; Clay; M15; Singles and Doubles Draws	Andrey Chepelev; 6–4, 7–6^{(8–6)}	(Switzerland) Rémy Bertola	(Austria) Neil Oberleitner (Italy) Simone Roncalli	(Australia) Li Tu (Argentina) Valerio Aboian (Northern Mariana Islands) Colin Sinclair (France) Matthieu Perchicot
April 18	Cairo, Egypt; Clay; M15; Singles and Doubles Draws	(Argentina) Lorenzo Joaquín Rodríguez; Ilya Rudiukov; 7–5, 6–4	(Philippines) Francis Alcantara (Northern Mariana Islands) Colin Sinclair	(Austria) Neil Oberleitner (Italy) Simone Roncalli	(Australia) Li Tu (Argentina) Valerio Aboian (Northern Mariana Islands) Colin Sinclair (France) Matthieu Perchicot
April 18	Shymkent, Kazakhstan; Clay; M15; Singles and Doubles Draws	Ivan Gakhov; 6–3, 6–4	(Ukraine) Eric Vanshelboim	Alibek Kachmazov; Yan Bondarevskiy	(Switzerland) Mirko Martinez (France) Sean Cuenin (Poland) Maks Kaśnikowski (Uzbekistan) Sergey Fomin
April 18	Shymkent, Kazakhstan; Clay; M15; Singles and Doubles Draws	Alibek Kachmazov; Marat Sharipov; 6–2, 6–3	(Georgia (country)) Aleksandre Bakshi; Yan Bondarevskiy	Alibek Kachmazov; Yan Bondarevskiy	(Switzerland) Mirko Martinez (France) Sean Cuenin (Poland) Maks Kaśnikowski (Uzbekistan) Sergey Fomin
April 18	Chiang Rai, Thailand; Hard; M15; Singles and Doubles Draws	(Australia) Omar Jasika; 6–1, 7–6^{(7–1)}	(Australia) Dayne Kelly	(New Zealand) Ajeet Rai (Japan) Yuta Shimizu	(New Zealand) Rubin Statham; Konstantin Kravchuk (Japan) Ryota Tanuma (Thailand) Kasidit Samrej
April 18	Chiang Rai, Thailand; Hard; M15; Singles and Doubles Draws	(South Korea) Nam Ji-sung (South Korea) Song Min-kyu; 6–2, 6–4	(China) Bai Yan (South Korea) Kim Cheong-eui	(New Zealand) Ajeet Rai (Japan) Yuta Shimizu	(New Zealand) Rubin Statham; Konstantin Kravchuk (Japan) Ryota Tanuma (Thailand) Kasidit Samrej
April 18	Monastir, Tunisia; Hard; M15; Singles and Doubles Draws	(China) Bu Yunchaokete; 6–4, 6–2	(Italy) Mattia Bellucci	(Estonia) Mark Lajal (China) Li Zhe	(Italy) Giovanni Oradini (Ivory Coast) Eliakim Coulibaly (Kazakhstan) Beibit Zhukayev (United States) Omni Kumar
April 18	Monastir, Tunisia; Hard; M15; Singles and Doubles Draws	(France) Arthur Bouquier (France) Martin Breysach; 6–3, 6–4	(Italy) Giovanni Oradini (Spain) Adrià Soriano Barrera	(Estonia) Mark Lajal (China) Li Zhe	(Italy) Giovanni Oradini (Ivory Coast) Eliakim Coulibaly (Kazakhstan) Beibit Zhukayev (United States) Omni Kumar
April 18	Antalya, Turkey; Clay; M15; Singles and Doubles Draws	(Sweden) Dragoș Nicolae Mădăraș; 6–4, 6–2	(Ukraine) Oleg Prihodko	(Switzerland) Damien Wenger (Italy) Lorenzo Claverie	(Romania) Ștefan Paloși (Japan) Yuki Mochizuki (Germany) Robert Strombachs (China) Li Hanwen
April 18	Antalya, Turkey; Clay; M15; Singles and Doubles Draws	(Germany) Robert Strombachs (Germany) Kai Wehnelt; 6–2, 6–4	(Romania) Vladimir Filip (Sweden) Dragoș Nicolae Mădăraș	(Switzerland) Damien Wenger (Italy) Lorenzo Claverie	(Romania) Ștefan Paloși (Japan) Yuki Mochizuki (Germany) Robert Strombachs (China) Li Hanwen
April 18	Orange Park, United States; Clay; M15; Singles and Doubles Draws	(China) Wu Yibing; 7–6^{(7–4)}, 7–5	(United States) Michael Zheng	(United States) Learner Tien (Brazil) Wilson Leite	(United States) Govind Nanda (Paraguay) Daniel Vallejo (China) Fnu Nidunjianzan (United States) Felix Corwin
April 18	Orange Park, United States; Clay; M15; Singles and Doubles Draws	(Ghana) Abraham Asaba (United States) Sekou Bangoura; 7–6^{(7–2)}, 3–6, [11–9]	(United States) Aidan Mayo (United States) Govind Nanda	(United States) Learner Tien (Brazil) Wilson Leite	(United States) Govind Nanda (Paraguay) Daniel Vallejo (China) Fnu Nidunjianzan (United States) Felix Corwin
April 25	Split, Croatia; Clay; M25; Singles and Doubles Draws	(Ukraine) Viacheslav Bielinskyi; 6–2, 6–3	(Germany) Rudolf Molleker	(Uzbekistan) Khumoyun Sultanov (Bosnia and Herzegovina) Aldin Šetkić	(Croatia) Duje Ajduković (Belgium) Christopher Heyman (Germany) Tim Sandkaulen (Croatia) Mili Poljičak
April 25	Split, Croatia; Clay; M25; Singles and Doubles Draws	(Croatia) Luka Mikrut (Croatia) Mili Poljičak; 2–6, 6–4, [10–8]	(France) Théo Arribagé (France) Luca Sanchez	(Uzbekistan) Khumoyun Sultanov (Bosnia and Herzegovina) Aldin Šetkić	(Croatia) Duje Ajduković (Belgium) Christopher Heyman (Germany) Tim Sandkaulen (Croatia) Mili Poljičak
April 25	Cairo, Egypt; Clay; M25; Singles and Doubles Draws	(Australia) Li Tu; 6–4, 3–6, 6–3	(Northern Mariana Islands) Colin Sinclair	(Switzerland) Rémy Bertola (Italy) Marco Miceli	(Argentina) Ignacio Monzón (Argentina) Leonardo Aboian; Andrey Chepelev (France) Matthieu Perchicot
April 25	Cairo, Egypt; Clay; M25; Singles and Doubles Draws	(Philippines) Francis Alcantara (Northern Mariana Islands) Colin Sinclair; 6–3, 6–3	Denis Klok; Ilya Rudiukov	(Switzerland) Rémy Bertola (Italy) Marco Miceli	(Argentina) Ignacio Monzón (Argentina) Leonardo Aboian; Andrey Chepelev (France) Matthieu Perchicot
April 25	Santa Margherita di Pula, Italy; Clay; M25; Singles and Doubles Draws	(France) Laurent Lokoli; 6–2, 5–7, 6–4	(Serbia) Miljan Zekić	(Austria) Lukas Neumayer (Italy) Fausto Tabacco	(Italy) Davide Galoppini (Germany) Louis Wessels (Italy) Edoardo Lavagno (Italy) Gianmarco Ferrari
April 25	Santa Margherita di Pula, Italy; Clay; M25; Singles and Doubles Draws	(Poland) Michał Dembek; Mikalai Haliak; 6–1, 6–2	(Italy) Marcello Serafini (Italy) Fausto Tabacco	(Austria) Lukas Neumayer (Italy) Fausto Tabacco	(Italy) Davide Galoppini (Germany) Louis Wessels (Italy) Edoardo Lavagno (Italy) Gianmarco Ferrari
April 25	Shymkent, Kazakhstan; Clay; M15; Singles and Doubles Draws	(France) Sean Cuenin; 6–3, 7–6^{(7–3)}	Alibek Kachmazov	(France) Giovanni Mpetshi Perricard (Ukraine) Eric Vanshelboim	Egor Agafonov; Yan Bondarevskiy (Italy) Andrea Gola; Ivan Gakhov
April 25	Shymkent, Kazakhstan; Clay; M15; Singles and Doubles Draws	(Uzbekistan) Sergey Fomin (Ukraine) Eric Vanshelboim; 6–3, 6–4	Erik Arutiunian (Georgia (country)) Saba Purtseladze	(France) Giovanni Mpetshi Perricard (Ukraine) Eric Vanshelboim	Egor Agafonov; Yan Bondarevskiy (Italy) Andrea Gola; Ivan Gakhov
April 25	Chiang Rai, Thailand; Hard; M15; Singles and Doubles Draws	(Japan) Makoto Ochi; 6–4, 6–4	(New Zealand) Rubin Statham	(India) S D Prajwal Dev (Japan) Takuto Niki	(Japan) Yuta Shimizu (Thailand) Yuttana Charoenphon (Australia) Omar Jasika (Japan) Ryota Tanuma
April 25	Chiang Rai, Thailand; Hard; M15; Singles and Doubles Draws	(Japan) Shinji Hazawa (Japan) Yuta Shimizu; 7–6^{(7–2)}, 6–1	(Thailand) Pruchya Isaro (Thailand) Thantub Suksumrarn	(India) S D Prajwal Dev (Japan) Takuto Niki	(Japan) Yuta Shimizu (Thailand) Yuttana Charoenphon (Australia) Omar Jasika (Japan) Ryota Tanuma
April 25	Monastir, Tunisia; Hard; M15; Singles and Doubles Draws	(Italy) Mattia Bellucci; 6–1, 6–4	(United States) Omni Kumar	(Spain) Adrià Soriano Barrera (Kazakhstan) Beibit Zhukayev	(Monaco) Lucas Catarina (Japan) Yusuke Takahashi (Italy) Federico Iannaccone; Kirill Kivattsev
April 25	Monastir, Tunisia; Hard; M15; Singles and Doubles Draws	(Italy) Mattia Bellucci (Italy) Federico Iannaccone; 6–2, 6–4	(Estonia) Daniil Glinka (Estonia) Karl Kiur Saar	(Spain) Adrià Soriano Barrera (Kazakhstan) Beibit Zhukayev	(Monaco) Lucas Catarina (Japan) Yusuke Takahashi (Italy) Federico Iannaccone; Kirill Kivattsev
April 25	Antalya, Turkey; Clay; M15; Singles and Doubles Draws	(Ukraine) Oleg Prihodko; 6–2, 6–4	(Spain) Pablo Llamas Ruiz	(Sweden) Dragoș Nicolae Mădăraș (Belgium) Raphaël Collignon	(Netherlands) Deney Wassermann (Ukraine) Illya Beloborodko (Netherlands) Ryan Nijboer (Germany) Peter Heller
April 25	Antalya, Turkey; Clay; M15; Singles and Doubles Draws	(Ukraine) Oleg Prihodko (Moldova) Ilya Snițari; 6–3, 6–3	(Czech Republic) Jiří Barnat (Czech Republic) Filip Duda	(Sweden) Dragoș Nicolae Mădăraș (Belgium) Raphaël Collignon	(Netherlands) Deney Wassermann (Ukraine) Illya Beloborodko (Netherlands) Ryan Nijboer (Germany) Peter Heller
April 25	Vero Beach, United States; Clay; M15; Singles and Doubles Draws	(United States) Sekou Bangoura; 6–4, 6–3	(United States) Ethan Quinn	(Canada) Liam Draxl (United States) John McNally	(United Kingdom) Millen Hurrion (South Africa) Khololwam Montsi (United States) Jakub Wojcik (United States) Emil Reinberg
April 25	Vero Beach, United States; Clay; M15; Singles and Doubles Draws	(United States) Nishesh Basavareddy (Venezuela) Ricardo Rodríguez-Pace; 6–4, 6–3	(Canada) Liam Draxl (United Kingdom) Millen Hurrion	(Canada) Liam Draxl (United States) John McNally	(United Kingdom) Millen Hurrion (South Africa) Khololwam Montsi (United States) Jakub Wojcik (United States) Emil Reinberg

=== May ===
Week of	Tournament	Winner	Runners-up	Semifinalists	Quarterfinalists
May 2	Santa Margherita di Pula, Italy; Clay; M25; Singles and Doubles Draws	(United Kingdom) Jack Pinnington Jones; 7–5, 6–2	(Italy) Giorgio Tabacco	(Germany) Timo Stodder (Spain) Carlos López Montagud	(United States) Oliver Crawford (Belgium) Joris De Loore (Italy) Alexander Weis (Italy) Davide Galoppini
May 2	Santa Margherita di Pula, Italy; Clay; M25; Singles and Doubles Draws	(France) Théo Arribagé (France) Luca Sanchez; 6–3, 6–4	(Italy) Leonardo Malgaroli (Italy) Marcello Serafini	(Germany) Timo Stodder (Spain) Carlos López Montagud	(United States) Oliver Crawford (Belgium) Joris De Loore (Italy) Alexander Weis (Italy) Davide Galoppini
May 2	Ulcinj, Montenegro; Clay; M25; Singles and Doubles Draws	(Serbia) Hamad Međedović; 6–1, 6–2	(Spain) Àlex Martí Pujolràs	(Serbia) Stefan Popović (Argentina) Mariano Kestelboim	(Israel) Daniel Cukierman (North Macedonia) Obrad Markovski (Italy) Samuel Vincent Ruggeri (Argentina) Juan Pablo Paz
May 2	Ulcinj, Montenegro; Clay; M25; Singles and Doubles Draws	(Romania) Cezar Crețu (Israel) Daniel Cukierman; 6–4, 6–1	(Croatia) Mili Poljičak (Serbia) Stefan Popović	(Serbia) Stefan Popović (Argentina) Mariano Kestelboim	(Israel) Daniel Cukierman (North Macedonia) Obrad Markovski (Italy) Samuel Vincent Ruggeri (Argentina) Juan Pablo Paz
May 2	Nottingham, United Kingdom; Hard; M25; Singles and Doubles Draws	(Switzerland) Leandro Riedi; 6–1, 6–7^{(11–13)}, 6–1	(United Kingdom) Stuart Parker	(United Kingdom) Billy Harris (United Kingdom) Alastair Gray	(United Kingdom) Brandon Murphy (United Kingdom) Aidan McHugh (United Kingdom) Giles Hussey (United Kingdom) Oscar Weightman
May 2	Nottingham, United Kingdom; Hard; M25; Singles and Doubles Draws	(United Kingdom) Julian Cash (United Kingdom) Henry Patten; 7–6^{(7–5)}, 6–2	(United Kingdom) Charles Broom (United Kingdom) Jan Choinski	(United Kingdom) Billy Harris (United Kingdom) Alastair Gray	(United Kingdom) Brandon Murphy (United Kingdom) Aidan McHugh (United Kingdom) Giles Hussey (United Kingdom) Oscar Weightman
May 2	Cairo, Egypt; Clay; M15; Singles and Doubles Draws	(Argentina) Ignacio Monzón; 6–1, 6–1	(Australia) Tristan Schoolkate	(Romania) Vlad Andrei Dancu (Argentina) Fermín Tenti	(Japan) Rio Noguchi (Italy) Marco Miceli (Uruguay) Francisco Llanes (Argentina) Valerio Aboian
May 2	Cairo, Egypt; Clay; M15; Singles and Doubles Draws	(Australia) Tristan Schoolkate (Northern Mariana Islands) Colin Sinclair; 6–1, 7–5	(Austria) David Pichler (Ukraine) Volodymyr Uzhylovskyi	(Romania) Vlad Andrei Dancu (Argentina) Fermín Tenti	(Japan) Rio Noguchi (Italy) Marco Miceli (Uruguay) Francisco Llanes (Argentina) Valerio Aboian
May 2	Meerbusch, Germany; Clay; M15; Singles and Doubles Draws	(Belgium) Gauthier Onclin; 6–3, 6–1	(Germany) Max Hans Rehberg	(Sweden) Karl Friberg (Sweden) Jonathan Mridha	(Germany) Louis Wessels (Belgium) Simon Beaupain (Poland) Olaf Pieczkowski (France) Robin Bertrand
May 2	Meerbusch, Germany; Clay; M15; Singles and Doubles Draws	(Germany) Constantin Frantzen (Germany) Tim Sandkaulen; 7–6^{(7–5)}, 6–4	(Chile) Miguel Fernando Pereira (Brazil) Gabriel Roveri Sidney	(Sweden) Karl Friberg (Sweden) Jonathan Mridha	(Germany) Louis Wessels (Belgium) Simon Beaupain (Poland) Olaf Pieczkowski (France) Robin Bertrand
May 2	Monastir, Tunisia; Hard; M15; Singles and Doubles Draws	(Tunisia) Skander Mansouri; 6–4, 6–2	(Australia) Li Tu	(France) Maxence Beaugé (United States) Omni Kumar	(Japan) Yusuke Takahashi (Germany) Philip Florig (Serbia) Boris Butulija (China) Li Zhe
May 2	Monastir, Tunisia; Hard; M15; Singles and Doubles Draws	(Tunisia) Skander Mansouri (Australia) Akira Santillan; 6–3, 6–0	(China) Gao Xin (China) Li Zhe	(France) Maxence Beaugé (United States) Omni Kumar	(Japan) Yusuke Takahashi (Germany) Philip Florig (Serbia) Boris Butulija (China) Li Zhe
May 2	Antalya, Turkey; Clay; M15; Singles and Doubles Draws	(Japan) Yuta Shimizu; 2–6, 6–4, 6–3	(Spain) Pablo Llamas Ruiz	(China) Li Hanwen (United States) Bruno Kuzuhara	(Ukraine) Illya Beloborodko (Romania) Mateo Bejenaru (Turkey) Mert Naci Türker (France) Corentin Denolly
May 2	Antalya, Turkey; Clay; M15; Singles and Doubles Draws	(Spain) Juan Pablo Cañas García (Spain) Pablo Llamas Ruiz; 6–4, 7–5	(Japan) Yuta Shimizu (Japan) Naoki Tajima	(China) Li Hanwen (United States) Bruno Kuzuhara	(Ukraine) Illya Beloborodko (Romania) Mateo Bejenaru (Turkey) Mert Naci Türker (France) Corentin Denolly
May 9	Prague, Czech Republic; Clay; M25; Singles and Doubles Draws	(Czech Republic) Martin Krumich; 7–6^{(7–3)}, 6–0	(France) Jurgen Briand	(Czech Republic) Andrew Paulson (Austria) Lukas Neumayer	(United States) Martin Damm (Egypt) Mohamed Safwat (Czech Republic) Antonín Bolardt (Spain) Eduard Esteve Lobato
May 9	Prague, Czech Republic; Clay; M25; Singles and Doubles Draws	(Israel) Daniel Cukierman (Australia) Andrew Harris; 6–0, 6–3	(Czech Republic) Filip Duda (Germany) Peter Heller	(Czech Republic) Andrew Paulson (Austria) Lukas Neumayer	(United States) Martin Damm (Egypt) Mohamed Safwat (Czech Republic) Antonín Bolardt (Spain) Eduard Esteve Lobato
May 9	Santa Margherita di Pula, Italy; Clay; M25; Singles and Doubles Draws	(Belgium) Michael Geerts; 6–3, 3–6, 6–1	(Italy) Alexander Weis	(Italy) Francesco Maestrelli (Australia) Tristan Schoolkate	(Italy) Matteo Gigante (Italy) Mattia Bellucci (Italy) Daniel Bagnolini (United States) Oliver Crawford
May 9	Santa Margherita di Pula, Italy; Clay; M25; Singles and Doubles Draws	(Zimbabwe) Benjamin Lock (Zimbabwe) Courtney John Lock; 6–4, 3–6, [10–8]	(Australia) Adam Taylor (Australia) Jason Taylor	(Italy) Francesco Maestrelli (Australia) Tristan Schoolkate	(Italy) Matteo Gigante (Italy) Mattia Bellucci (Italy) Daniel Bagnolini (United States) Oliver Crawford
May 9	Kalmar, Sweden; Clay; M25; Singles and Doubles Draws	(Germany) Louis Wessels; 6–2, 6–3	(Italy) Daniele Capecchi	(Denmark) Elmer Møller (Sweden) Leo Borg	(Sweden) Arslanbek Temirhanov (Sweden) Karl Friberg (Sweden) Michael Minasyan (Germany) Adrian Oetzbach
May 9	Kalmar, Sweden; Clay; M25; Singles and Doubles Draws	(Sweden) Simon Freund (Denmark) Johannes Ingildsen; 6–1, 6–1	(Sweden) Timothy Carlsson Seger (Sweden) Isac Strömberg	(Denmark) Elmer Møller (Sweden) Leo Borg	(Sweden) Arslanbek Temirhanov (Sweden) Karl Friberg (Sweden) Michael Minasyan (Germany) Adrian Oetzbach
May 9	Monastir, Tunisia; Hard; M25; Singles and Doubles Draws	(Australia) Li Tu; 6–7^{(3–7)}, 6–4, 7–6^{(7–4)}	(Tunisia) Skander Mansouri	(United States) Christian Langmo (Tunisia) Aziz Dougaz	(Italy) Raúl Brancaccio (China) Li Hanwen (Australia) Akira Santillan (Italy) Lorenzo Lorusso
May 9	Monastir, Tunisia; Hard; M25; Singles and Doubles Draws	(Tunisia) Aziz Dougaz (Australia) Akira Santillan; 7–6^{(7–1)}, 7–6^{(7–3)}	(France) Théo Arribagé (France) Luca Sanchez	(United States) Christian Langmo (Tunisia) Aziz Dougaz	(Italy) Raúl Brancaccio (China) Li Hanwen (Australia) Akira Santillan (Italy) Lorenzo Lorusso
May 9	Nottingham, United Kingdom; Hard; M25; Singles and Doubles Draws	(United Kingdom) Billy Harris; 6–4, 6–3	(Israel) Edan Leshem	(United Kingdom) Charles Broom (Switzerland) Leandro Riedi	(United States) Christian Harrison (United Kingdom) Alastair Gray (United Kingdom) Stuart Parker (Japan) Yasutaka Uchiyama
May 9	Nottingham, United Kingdom; Hard; M25; Singles and Doubles Draws	(United Kingdom) Julian Cash (United Kingdom) Henry Patten; 6–3, 5–7, [10–2]	(Australia) Omar Jasika (Israel) Edan Leshem	(United Kingdom) Charles Broom (Switzerland) Leandro Riedi	(United States) Christian Harrison (United Kingdom) Alastair Gray (United Kingdom) Stuart Parker (Japan) Yasutaka Uchiyama
May 9	Doboj, Bosnia and Herzegovina; Clay; M15; Singles and Doubles Draws	(Hungary) Gergely Madarász; 6–3, 7–5	(Japan) Rimpei Kawakami	(Romania) Sebastian Gima (Portugal) Henrique Rocha	(Italy) Lorenzo Rottoli (Bosnia and Herzegovina) Andrej Nedić (Italy) Gian Marco Ortenzi (France) Luka Pavlovic
May 9	Doboj, Bosnia and Herzegovina; Clay; M15; Singles and Doubles Draws	(Ukraine) Oleksandr Bielinskyi (Japan) Rimpei Kawakami; 3–6, 7–6^{(7–3)}, [10–6]	(Slovakia) Miloš Karol (Slovakia) Lukáš Pokorný	(Romania) Sebastian Gima (Portugal) Henrique Rocha	(Italy) Lorenzo Rottoli (Bosnia and Herzegovina) Andrej Nedić (Italy) Gian Marco Ortenzi (France) Luka Pavlovic
May 9	Cairo, Egypt; Clay; M15; Singles and Doubles Draws	(Germany) Sebastian Prechtel; 3–6, 6–3, 6–3	(Italy) Marco Miceli	(Argentina) Valerio Aboian (Italy) Manuel Mazza	(Egypt) Amr Elsayed; Denis Klok (Algeria) Samir Hamza Reguig (Argentina) Fermín Tenti
May 9	Cairo, Egypt; Clay; M15; Singles and Doubles Draws	(Argentina) Leonardo Aboian (Argentina) Valerio Aboian; 6–2, 6–4	(Japan) Makoto Ochi (Japan) Seita Watanabe	(Argentina) Valerio Aboian (Italy) Manuel Mazza	(Egypt) Amr Elsayed; Denis Klok (Algeria) Samir Hamza Reguig (Argentina) Fermín Tenti
May 9	Heraklion, Greece; Hard; M15; Singles and Doubles Draws	(Estonia) Mark Lajal; 6–4, 6–3	(Czech Republic) Dominik Palán	(United States) Colin Markes (Switzerland) Adrian Bodmer	(Japan) Shuichi Sekiguchi (Hong Kong) Wong Hong-kit (France) Florent Bax (Belgium) Yannick Mertens
May 9	Heraklion, Greece; Hard; M15; Singles and Doubles Draws	(Australia) Aaron Addison (Canada) Kelsey Stevenson; 7–6^{(7–3)}, 7–6^{(7–4)}	(Bulgaria) Gabriel Donev (Bulgaria) Simon Anthony Ivanov	(United States) Colin Markes (Switzerland) Adrian Bodmer	(Japan) Shuichi Sekiguchi (Hong Kong) Wong Hong-kit (France) Florent Bax (Belgium) Yannick Mertens
May 9	Cancún, Mexico; Hard; M15; Singles and Doubles Draws	(Dominican Republic) Peter Bertran; 6–3, 6–1	(United States) Joshua Sheehy	(United States) Isaiah Strode (United States) Ezekiel Clark	(Jamaica) Rowland Phillips (Colombia) Juan Sebastián Gómez (Jamaica) Blaise Bicknell (United States) Alexander Bernard
May 9	Cancún, Mexico; Hard; M15; Singles and Doubles Draws	(Bolivia) Boris Arias (Bolivia) Federico Zeballos; 6–4, 6–3	(Dominican Republic) Peter Bertran (Bolivia) Alejandro Mendoza	(United States) Isaiah Strode (United States) Ezekiel Clark	(Jamaica) Rowland Phillips (Colombia) Juan Sebastián Gómez (Jamaica) Blaise Bicknell (United States) Alexander Bernard
May 9	Ulcinj, Montenegro; Clay; M15; Singles and Doubles Draws	(France) Valentin Royer; 6–2, 6–2	(Italy) Samuel Vincent Ruggeri	(Serbia) Branko Đurić (Japan) Taisei Ichikawa	(Argentina) Juan Pablo Paz (Hungary) André Biró (Japan) Keisuke Saitoh (Ukraine) Georgii Kravchenko
May 9	Ulcinj, Montenegro; Clay; M15; Singles and Doubles Draws	(Italy) Stefano Reitano (Italy) Alessio Zanotti; 4–6, 7–6^{(7–0)}, [10–8]	(Japan) Keisuke Saitoh (Japan) Daisuke Sumizawa	(Serbia) Branko Đurić (Japan) Taisei Ichikawa	(Argentina) Juan Pablo Paz (Hungary) André Biró (Japan) Keisuke Saitoh (Ukraine) Georgii Kravchenko
May 9	Valldoreix, Spain; Clay; M15; Singles and Doubles Draws	(Spain) Daniel Mérida; 2–6, 7–5, 6–2	(Spain) Oriol Roca Batalla	(Spain) Daniel Rincón (Spain) David Jordà Sanchis	(Portugal) Tiago Cação (Spain) Imanol López Morillo (Syria) Hazem Naw (Australia) James McCabe
May 9	Valldoreix, Spain; Clay; M15; Singles and Doubles Draws	(Spain) Álvaro López San Martín (Spain) Daniel Rincón; 6–3, 6–2	(Argentina) Franco Emanuel Egea (Syria) Hazem Naw	(Spain) Daniel Rincón (Spain) David Jordà Sanchis	(Portugal) Tiago Cação (Spain) Imanol López Morillo (Syria) Hazem Naw (Australia) James McCabe
May 9	Monastir, Tunisia; Hard; M15; Singles and Doubles Draws	(China) Bu Yunchaokete; 6–4, 7–5	(Chinese Taipei) Ray Ho	(France) Mathieu Scaglia (Spain) Alberto Barroso Campos	(United States) Gage Brymer (Italy) Marco Brugnerotto (Germany) Niklas Schell (China) Wang Xiaofei
May 9	Monastir, Tunisia; Hard; M15; Singles and Doubles Draws	(Spain) Alberto Barroso Campos (Chinese Taipei) Ray Ho; 6–3, 4–6, [10–5]	(China) Wang Aoran (China) Bu Yunchaokete	(France) Mathieu Scaglia (Spain) Alberto Barroso Campos	(United States) Gage Brymer (Italy) Marco Brugnerotto (Germany) Niklas Schell (China) Wang Xiaofei
May 9	Antalya, Turkey; Clay; M15; Singles and Doubles Draws	(Romania) Nicolae Frunză; 4–6, 6–4, 6–2	(Netherlands) Deney Wassermann	(United States) Bruno Kuzuhara (France) Mathys Erhard	(Japan) Yuta Shimizu (Poland) Maciej Rajski (Germany) Paul Wörner (Switzerland) Jérôme Kym
May 9	Antalya, Turkey; Clay; M15; Singles and Doubles Draws	(United States) Bruno Kuzuhara (United States) Victor Lilov; Walkover	(Poland) Maks Kaśnikowski (Switzerland) Jérôme Kym	(United States) Bruno Kuzuhara (France) Mathys Erhard	(Japan) Yuta Shimizu (Poland) Maciej Rajski (Germany) Paul Wörner (Switzerland) Jérôme Kym
May 16	Osijek, Croatia; Clay; M25; Singles and Doubles Draws	(Ukraine) Vladyslav Orlov; 6–1, 6–2	(Hungary) Mátyás Füle	(France) Timo Legout (Republic of Ireland) Simon Carr	(Hungary) Péter Fajta (Austria) David Pichler (Ukraine) Viacheslav Bielinskyi (Serbia) Dušan Obradović
May 16	Osijek, Croatia; Clay; M25; Singles and Doubles Draws	(India) Dev Javia (Slovakia) Lukáš Pokorný; 7–6^{(7–3)}, 3–6, [10–8]	(Croatia) Luka Mikrut (Croatia) Mili Poljičak	(France) Timo Legout (Republic of Ireland) Simon Carr	(Hungary) Péter Fajta (Austria) David Pichler (Ukraine) Viacheslav Bielinskyi (Serbia) Dušan Obradović
May 16	Most, Czech Republic; Clay; M25; Singles and Doubles Draws	(Czech Republic) Andrew Paulson; 6–3, 6–3	(Austria) Maximilian Neuchrist	(Germany) Rudolf Molleker (Czech Republic) Jakub Menšík	(Czech Republic) Pavel Nejedlý (Czech Republic) Marek Gengel (Egypt) Mohamed Safwat (Czech Republic) David Poljak
May 16	Most, Czech Republic; Clay; M25; Singles and Doubles Draws	(Germany) Constantin Frantzen (Germany) Tim Sandkaulen; 6–3, 4–6, [10–7]	(Czech Republic) Marek Gengel (Czech Republic) David Poljak	(Germany) Rudolf Molleker (Czech Republic) Jakub Menšík	(Czech Republic) Pavel Nejedlý (Czech Republic) Marek Gengel (Egypt) Mohamed Safwat (Czech Republic) David Poljak
May 16	Ulcinj, Montenegro; Clay; M25; Singles and Doubles Draws	(Italy) Samuel Vincent Ruggeri; 6–7^{(2–7)}, 6–1, 7–5	(France) Valentin Royer	(United States) Oliver Crawford (Argentina) Mariano Navone	(Belgium) Tibo Colson (Argentina) Juan Pablo Paz (Romania) Cezar Crețu (North Macedonia) Gorazd Srbljak
May 16	Ulcinj, Montenegro; Clay; M25; Singles and Doubles Draws	Ivan Liutarevich (Italy) Marcello Serafini; 4–6, 6–1, [10–6]	(Romania) Cezar Crețu (France) Valentin Royer	(United States) Oliver Crawford (Argentina) Mariano Navone	(Belgium) Tibo Colson (Argentina) Juan Pablo Paz (Romania) Cezar Crețu (North Macedonia) Gorazd Srbljak
May 16	Vic, Spain; Clay; M25; Singles and Doubles Draws	(Spain) Alejandro Moros Cañas; 7–6^{(7–4)}, 5–7, 6–1	(Spain) Pol Martín Tiffon	(France) Kyrian Jacquet (France) Kenny de Schepper	(Spain) Pablo Llamas Ruiz (Spain) Benjamín Winter López (Brazil) Marcelo Zormann (Spain) Imanol López Morillo
May 16	Vic, Spain; Clay; M25; Singles and Doubles Draws	(Brazil) Oscar José Gutierrez (Brazil) Marcelo Zormann; 6–1, 6–4	(Portugal) Tiago Cação (Spain) Benjamín Winter López	(France) Kyrian Jacquet (France) Kenny de Schepper	(Spain) Pablo Llamas Ruiz (Spain) Benjamín Winter López (Brazil) Marcelo Zormann (Spain) Imanol López Morillo
May 16	Monastir, Tunisia; Hard; M25; Singles and Doubles Draws	(Japan) Yasutaka Uchiyama; 7–6^{(7–3)}, 6–7^{(5–7)}, 6–3	(Australia) Akira Santillan	(China) Sun Fajing (Chinese Taipei) Hsu Yu-hsiou	(Australia) Dane Sweeny (France) Lucas Poullain (France) Arthur Bouquier (United Kingdom) Aidan McHugh
May 16	Monastir, Tunisia; Hard; M25; Singles and Doubles Draws	(Chinese Taipei) Hsu Yu-hsiou (China) Sun Fajing; 7–6^{(7–4)}, 6–3	(Australia) Jayden Court (Australia) Dane Sweeny	(China) Sun Fajing (Chinese Taipei) Hsu Yu-hsiou	(Australia) Dane Sweeny (France) Lucas Poullain (France) Arthur Bouquier (United Kingdom) Aidan McHugh
May 16	Oran, Algeria; Clay; M15; Singles and Doubles Draws	(Switzerland) Mirko Martinez; 6–3, 4–6, 6–2	(Tunisia) Aziz Dougaz	(France) Robin Bertrand (Sweden) Leo Borg	(India) Ishaque Eqbal (India) Digvijay Pratap Singh (Algeria) Rayan Ghedjemis (Zimbabwe) Benjamin Lock
May 16	Oran, Algeria; Clay; M15; Singles and Doubles Draws	(France) Robin Bertrand (Switzerland) Mirko Martinez; 1–6, 6–4, [10–6]	(Zimbabwe) Benjamin Lock (Zimbabwe) Courtney John Lock	(France) Robin Bertrand (Sweden) Leo Borg	(India) Ishaque Eqbal (India) Digvijay Pratap Singh (Algeria) Rayan Ghedjemis (Zimbabwe) Benjamin Lock
May 16	Warmbad-Villach, Austria; Clay; M15; Singles and Doubles Draws	(Italy) Giovanni Oradini; 7–5, 7–5	(Germany) Sebastian Prechtel	(Austria) Sandro Kopp (Switzerland) Jérôme Kym	(Italy) Tommaso Compagnucci (Italy) Giacomo Dambrosi (Austria) Sebastian Sorger (Austria) Lukas Krainer
May 16	Warmbad-Villach, Austria; Clay; M15; Singles and Doubles Draws	(Austria) Sandro Kopp (Germany) Kai Lemstra; 7–6^{(7–1)}, 7–6^{(7–3)}	(Georgia (country)) Aleksandre Bakshi (Italy) Giovanni Oradini	(Austria) Sandro Kopp (Switzerland) Jérôme Kym	(Italy) Tommaso Compagnucci (Italy) Giacomo Dambrosi (Austria) Sebastian Sorger (Austria) Lukas Krainer
May 16	Prijedor, Bosnia and Herzegovina; Clay; M15; Singles and Doubles Draws	(Japan) Rimpei Kawakami; 6–2, 6–2	(Ukraine) Oleksandr Ovcharenko	(France) Lilian Marmousez (Bosnia and Herzegovina) Aziz Kijametović	(Uruguay) Franco Roncadelli (North Macedonia) Kalin Ivanovski; Marat Sharipov (Portugal) Jaime Faria
May 16	Prijedor, Bosnia and Herzegovina; Clay; M15; Singles and Doubles Draws	(Belgium) Raphaël Collignon (Belgium) Gauthier Onclin; 6–3, 1–6, [10–2]	(Portugal) Jaime Faria (North Macedonia) Kalin Ivanovski	(France) Lilian Marmousez (Bosnia and Herzegovina) Aziz Kijametović	(Uruguay) Franco Roncadelli (North Macedonia) Kalin Ivanovski; Marat Sharipov (Portugal) Jaime Faria
May 16	Cairo, Egypt; Clay; M15; Singles and Doubles Draws	(Italy) Manuel Mazza; 6–3, 6–1	(Argentina) Ignacio Monzón	(Italy) Lorenzo Bocchi (Spain) Bruno Pujol Navarro	(Japan) Rio Noguchi (Argentina) Leonardo Aboian (Uruguay) Francisco Llanes (Argentina) Valerio Aboian
May 16	Cairo, Egypt; Clay; M15; Singles and Doubles Draws	(Argentina) Ignacio Monzón (Argentina) Fermín Tenti; 6–2, 4–6, [10–6]	(Italy) Alessandro Bellifemine (Italy) Gabriele Maria Noce	(Italy) Lorenzo Bocchi (Spain) Bruno Pujol Navarro	(Japan) Rio Noguchi (Argentina) Leonardo Aboian (Uruguay) Francisco Llanes (Argentina) Valerio Aboian
May 16	Kouvola, Finland; Hard; M15; Singles and Doubles Draws	Ivan Nedelko; 4–6, 6–3, 6–4	(Finland) Otto Virtanen	(Finland) Aleksi Löfman (United Kingdom) Oscar Weightman	Bekhan Atlangeriev (Finland) Patrik Niklas-Salminen (Sweden) Karl Friberg (Denmark) Christian Sigsgaard
May 16	Kouvola, Finland; Hard; M15; Singles and Doubles Draws	(Finland) Patrik Niklas-Salminen (Denmark) Christian Sigsgaard; 6–3, 6–2	Ivan Denisov (Bulgaria) Leonid Sheyngezikht	(Finland) Aleksi Löfman (United Kingdom) Oscar Weightman	Bekhan Atlangeriev (Finland) Patrik Niklas-Salminen (Sweden) Karl Friberg (Denmark) Christian Sigsgaard
May 16	Heraklion, Greece; Hard; M15; Singles and Doubles Draws	(Australia) Omar Jasika; 7–5, 6–3	(United Kingdom) Charles Broom	(Japan) Shinji Hazawa (Japan) Shuichi Sekiguchi	(Australia) Matthew Dellavedova (United Kingdom) Mark Whitehouse (France) Hugo Pontico (Estonia) Mark Lajal
May 16	Heraklion, Greece; Hard; M15; Singles and Doubles Draws	(United Kingdom) Charles Broom (United Kingdom) Julian Cash; 7–5, 6–4	(Italy) Gabriele Bosio (United Kingdom) Mark Whitehouse	(Japan) Shinji Hazawa (Japan) Shuichi Sekiguchi	(Australia) Matthew Dellavedova (United Kingdom) Mark Whitehouse (France) Hugo Pontico (Estonia) Mark Lajal
May 16	Akko, Israel; Hard; M15; Singles and Doubles Draws	(Israel) Daniel Cukierman; 7–5, 6–2	(Israel) Ben Patael	(Israel) Orel Kimhi (United Kingdom) Giles Hussey	(Japan) Seita Watanabe (Israel) Edan Leshem (Israel) Sahar Simon (United States) Kyle Seelig
May 16	Akko, Israel; Hard; M15; Singles and Doubles Draws	(Israel) Daniel Cukierman (Israel) Edan Leshem; 6–3, 6–4	(United Kingdom) Giles Hussey (United Kingdom) Daniel Little	(Israel) Orel Kimhi (United Kingdom) Giles Hussey	(Japan) Seita Watanabe (Israel) Edan Leshem (Israel) Sahar Simon (United States) Kyle Seelig
May 16	Cancún, Mexico; Hard; M15; Singles and Doubles Draws	(Greece) Michail Pervolarakis; 6–3, 6–4	(China) Huang Haoyuan	(Jamaica) Blaise Bicknell (Costa Rica) Jesse Flores	(Bolivia) Federico Zeballos (Mexico) César Ramírez (Japan) Hiroyasu Ehara (United States) Elijah Strode
May 16	Cancún, Mexico; Hard; M15; Singles and Doubles Draws	(Colombia) Juan Sebastián Gómez (United States) Bryce Nakashima; 6–3, 6–4	(United States) Jake Bhangdia (India) Dhruv Sunish	(Jamaica) Blaise Bicknell (Costa Rica) Jesse Flores	(Bolivia) Federico Zeballos (Mexico) César Ramírez (Japan) Hiroyasu Ehara (United States) Elijah Strode
May 16	Monastir, Tunisia; Hard; M15; Singles and Doubles Draws	(China) Bu Yunchaokete; 6–1, 6–7^{(4–7)}, 6–3	(Spain) Alberto Barroso Campos	(Germany) Philip Florig (Germany) Niklas Schell	(China) Wang Xiaofei (Germany) Maik Steiner (China) Cui Jie (United States) Gage Brymer
May 16	Monastir, Tunisia; Hard; M15; Singles and Doubles Draws	(Spain) Alberto Barroso Campos (Germany) Niklas Schell; 6–3, 6–1	(Australia) Alexander Crnokrak (Australia) Jordan Smith	(Germany) Philip Florig (Germany) Niklas Schell	(China) Wang Xiaofei (Germany) Maik Steiner (China) Cui Jie (United States) Gage Brymer
May 16	Antalya, Turkey; Clay; M15; Singles and Doubles Draws	(France) Mathys Erhard; 2–6, 6–3, 6–3	(China) Te Rigele	(Spain) Daniel Rincón (Romania) Nicolae Frunză	(Italy) Federico Arnaboldi (Germany) Paul Wörner (Uruguay) Ignacio Carou; Evgeny Philippov
May 16	Antalya, Turkey; Clay; M15; Singles and Doubles Draws	(Italy) Federico Arnaboldi (Italy) Gianmarco Ferrari; 5–7, 6–2, [10–6]	(Uruguay) Ignacio Carou (Spain) Daniel Rincón	(Spain) Daniel Rincón (Romania) Nicolae Frunză	(Italy) Federico Arnaboldi (Germany) Paul Wörner (Uruguay) Ignacio Carou; Evgeny Philippov
May 23	Jablonec nad Nisou, Czech Republic; Clay; M25; Singles and Doubles Draws	(Uzbekistan) Khumoyun Sultanov; 6–7^{(10–12)}, 7–6^{(7–5)}, 6–3	(United States) Martin Damm	(France) Calvin Hemery (Switzerland) Damien Wenger	(Czech Republic) Michael Vrbenský (Czech Republic) Andrew Paulson (France) Harold Mayot (Ukraine) Eric Vanshelboim
May 23	Jablonec nad Nisou, Czech Republic; Clay; M25; Singles and Doubles Draws	(France) Calvin Hemery (Switzerland) Damien Wenger; 6–4, 6–4	(Czech Republic) Jiří Barnat (Czech Republic) Filip Duda	(France) Calvin Hemery (Switzerland) Damien Wenger	(Czech Republic) Michael Vrbenský (Czech Republic) Andrew Paulson (France) Harold Mayot (Ukraine) Eric Vanshelboim
May 23	Netanya, Israel; Hard; M25; Singles and Doubles Draws	(Israel) Daniel Cukierman; 6–1, 6–2	(United States) Kyle Seelig	(Japan) Kaichi Uchida (Israel) Edan Leshem	(Australia) Calum Puttergill (Turkey) Yankı Erel (France) Dan Added (South Africa) Alec Beckley
May 23	Netanya, Israel; Hard; M25; Singles and Doubles Draws	(Australia) Aaron Addison (Australia) Calum Puttergill; 6–3, 3–6, [10–7]	(United Kingdom) Giles Hussey (United Kingdom) Daniel Little	(Japan) Kaichi Uchida (Israel) Edan Leshem	(Australia) Calum Puttergill (Turkey) Yankı Erel (France) Dan Added (South Africa) Alec Beckley
May 23	Mataró, Spain; Clay; M25; Singles and Doubles Draws	(Spain) Pol Martín Tiffon; 2–6, 6–3, 6–2	(Spain) Pablo Llamas Ruiz	(Italy) Raúl Brancaccio (Spain) Oriol Roca Batalla	(Brazil) Oscar José Gutierrez (Dominican Republic) Nick Hardt; Alexey Vatutin (Spain) Carlos Sánchez Jover
May 23	Mataró, Spain; Clay; M25; Singles and Doubles Draws	(Italy) Raúl Brancaccio (Spain) Carlos López Montagud; 6–4, 6–4	(Spain) Àlex Martínez (Spain) Jordi Mas de Ugarte	(Italy) Raúl Brancaccio (Spain) Oriol Roca Batalla	(Brazil) Oscar José Gutierrez (Dominican Republic) Nick Hardt; Alexey Vatutin (Spain) Carlos Sánchez Jover
May 23	Monastir, Tunisia; Hard; M25; Singles and Doubles Draws	(Australia) Akira Santillan; 2–6, 7–6^{(7–3)}, 6–2	(China) Li Zhe	(United States) Omni Kumar (China) Li Hanwen	(Brazil) Matheus Cury Bueres (Australia) Jordan Smith (Chinese Taipei) Ray Ho (Tunisia) Skander Mansouri
May 23	Monastir, Tunisia; Hard; M25; Singles and Doubles Draws	(Chinese Taipei) Hsu Yu-hsiou (China) Sun Fajing; 6–4, 7–6^{(7–2)}	(Australia) Blake Bayldon (Australia) Jordan Smith	(United States) Omni Kumar (China) Li Hanwen	(Brazil) Matheus Cury Bueres (Australia) Jordan Smith (Chinese Taipei) Ray Ho (Tunisia) Skander Mansouri
May 23	Oran, Algeria; Clay; M15; Singles and Doubles Draws	(France) Robin Bertrand; 5–7, 6–4, 6–1	(Algeria) Rayan Ghedjemis	(Zimbabwe) Benjamin Lock (Tunisia) Aziz Dougaz	(France) Mehdi Sadaoui (India) Digvijay Pratap Singh (India) Ishaque Eqbal (Switzerland) Mirko Martinez
May 23	Oran, Algeria; Clay; M15; Singles and Doubles Draws	(Zimbabwe) Benjamin Lock (Zimbabwe) Courtney John Lock; 6–1, 6–7^{(4–7)}, [10–3]	(France) Robin Bertrand (Switzerland) Mirko Martinez	(Zimbabwe) Benjamin Lock (Tunisia) Aziz Dougaz	(France) Mehdi Sadaoui (India) Digvijay Pratap Singh (India) Ishaque Eqbal (Switzerland) Mirko Martinez
May 23	Brčko, Bosnia and Herzegovina; Clay; M15; Singles and Doubles Draws	(Belgium) Gauthier Onclin; 5–7, 6–2, 6–3	(Belgium) Raphaël Collignon	(Italy) Alexander Weis (Japan) Rimpei Kawakami	(Italy) Luigi Sorrentino (Ukraine) Oleksandr Ovcharenko (Morocco) Adam Moundir; Marat Sharipov
May 23	Brčko, Bosnia and Herzegovina; Clay; M15; Singles and Doubles Draws	(Morocco) Adam Moundir (Ukraine) Vladyslav Orlov; 5–7, 6–2, [12–10]	(Ukraine) Oleksandr Bielinskyi (Ukraine) Viacheslav Bielinskyi	(Italy) Alexander Weis (Japan) Rimpei Kawakami	(Italy) Luigi Sorrentino (Ukraine) Oleksandr Ovcharenko (Morocco) Adam Moundir; Marat Sharipov
May 23	Quito, Ecuador; Clay; M15; Singles and Doubles Draws	(Bolivia) Murkel Dellien; 7–6^{(7–1)}, 6–3	(Peru) Arklon Huertas del Pino	(Argentina) Juan Bautista Otegui (Brazil) Eduardo Ribeiro	(Argentina) Alejo Lorenzo Lingua Lavallén (Ecuador) Álvaro Guillén Meza (Chile) Daniel Antonio Núñez (Venezuela) Ricardo Rodríguez-Pace
May 23	Quito, Ecuador; Clay; M15; Singles and Doubles Draws	(Brazil) Igor Gimenez (Brazil) Nicolas Zanellato; 6–2, 7–6^{(7–5)}	(Bolivia) Murkel Dellien (Peru) Arklon Huertas del Pino	(Argentina) Juan Bautista Otegui (Brazil) Eduardo Ribeiro	(Argentina) Alejo Lorenzo Lingua Lavallén (Ecuador) Álvaro Guillén Meza (Chile) Daniel Antonio Núñez (Venezuela) Ricardo Rodríguez-Pace
May 23	Heraklion, Greece; Hard; M15; Singles and Doubles Draws	(Japan) Shuichi Sekiguchi; 6–3, 6–1	(Bulgaria) Simon Anthony Ivanov	(United Kingdom) Mark Whitehouse (Switzerland) Jérôme Kym	(Greece) Stefanos Sakellaridis (Australia) Matthew Dellavedova (United States) Emil Reinberg (Canada) Kelsey Stevenson
May 23	Heraklion, Greece; Hard; M15; Singles and Doubles Draws	(Japan) Shinji Hazawa (Japan) Shuichi Sekiguchi; 6–4, 4–6, [12–10]	(Bulgaria) Simon Anthony Ivanov (Hong Kong) Wong Hong-kit	(United Kingdom) Mark Whitehouse (Switzerland) Jérôme Kym	(Greece) Stefanos Sakellaridis (Australia) Matthew Dellavedova (United States) Emil Reinberg (Canada) Kelsey Stevenson
May 23	Cancún, Mexico; Hard; M15; Singles and Doubles Draws	(United States) Brandon Holt; 6–1, 6–2	(Luxembourg) Alex Knaff	(United States) Alexander Bernard (Bolivia) Federico Zeballos	(Brazil) Luís Britto (United States) Ezekiel Clark (Colombia) Juan Sebastián Gómez (China) Huang Haoyuan
May 23	Cancún, Mexico; Hard; M15; Singles and Doubles Draws	(United States) Nick Chappell (Republic of Ireland) Osgar O'Hoisin; 6–4, 6–1	(Mexico) Ivar José Aramburu Contreras (Colombia) Juan Sebastián Gómez	(United States) Alexander Bernard (Bolivia) Federico Zeballos	(Brazil) Luís Britto (United States) Ezekiel Clark (Colombia) Juan Sebastián Gómez (China) Huang Haoyuan
May 23	Ulcinj, Montenegro; Clay; M15; Singles and Doubles Draws	(Italy) Marcello Serafini; 6–1, 6–3	(Cyprus) Petros Chrysochos	(Belgium) Arnaud Bovy (Italy) Stefano Reitano	(United States) Oliver Crawford (Italy) Samuel Vincent Ruggeri; Ivan Liutarevich (Japan) Keisuke Saitoh
May 23	Ulcinj, Montenegro; Clay; M15; Singles and Doubles Draws	(Italy) Marcello Serafini (Italy) Samuel Vincent Ruggeri; 6–3, 6–4	(Cyprus) Petros Chrysochos (Montenegro) Rrezart Cungu	(Belgium) Arnaud Bovy (Italy) Stefano Reitano	(United States) Oliver Crawford (Italy) Samuel Vincent Ruggeri; Ivan Liutarevich (Japan) Keisuke Saitoh
May 23	Bucharest, Romania; Clay; M15; Singles and Doubles Draws	(Romania) Călin Manda; 6–3, 6–4	(Romania) Cezar Crețu	(Italy) Stefano Napolitano (Romania) David Ionel	(Sweden) Dragoș Nicolae Mădăraș (Poland) Aleksandar Orlikowski (Paraguay) Daniel Vallejo (Italy) Daniele Capecchi
May 23	Bucharest, Romania; Clay; M15; Singles and Doubles Draws	(United States) Trey Hilderbrand (Romania) Bogdan Pavel; 6–3, 6–7^{(8–10)}, [10–4]	(Italy) Daniele Capecchi (Germany) Kai Wehnelt	(Italy) Stefano Napolitano (Romania) David Ionel	(Sweden) Dragoș Nicolae Mădăraș (Poland) Aleksandar Orlikowski (Paraguay) Daniel Vallejo (Italy) Daniele Capecchi
May 23	Monastir, Tunisia; Hard; M15; Singles and Doubles Draws	(United States) Gage Brymer; 6–4, 6–0	(South Africa) Khololwam Montsi	(France) Quentin Folliot (Australia) Alexander Crnokrak	(United States) Dali Blanch (Chinese Taipei) Huang Tsung-hao (United States) Aman Sharma (China) Cui Jie
May 23	Monastir, Tunisia; Hard; M15; Singles and Doubles Draws	(China) Wang Aoran (China) Bu Yunchaokete; 6–2, 7–6^{(7–2)}	(Japan) Kazuma Kawachi (Japan) Ryuki Matsuda	(France) Quentin Folliot (Australia) Alexander Crnokrak	(United States) Dali Blanch (Chinese Taipei) Huang Tsung-hao (United States) Aman Sharma (China) Cui Jie
May 23	Antalya, Turkey; Clay; M15; Singles and Doubles Draws	(Italy) Gianmarco Ferrari; 6–2, 6–4	(France) Thomas Deschamps	(Uzbekistan) Maxim Shin (Uruguay) Ignacio Carou	(Poland) Jasza Szajrych (Germany) Robert Strombachs (Germany) Paul Wörner (Italy) Gabriele Piraino
May 23	Antalya, Turkey; Clay; M15; Singles and Doubles Draws	Vladimir Korolev; Maxim Ratniuk; 7–6^{(7–3)}, 4–6, [10–5]	(Australia) Matthew Romios (Australia) Brandon Walkin	(Uzbekistan) Maxim Shin (Uruguay) Ignacio Carou	(Poland) Jasza Szajrych (Germany) Robert Strombachs (Germany) Paul Wörner (Italy) Gabriele Piraino
May 30	Kiseljak, Bosnia and Herzegovina; Clay; M25; Singles and Doubles Draws	(Belgium) Joris De Loore; 6–4, 5–7, 6–3	(Lebanon) Hady Habib	(Switzerland) Jakub Paul (Belgium) Raphaël Collignon	(Ukraine) Viacheslav Bielinskyi (Czech Republic) Michael Vrbenský (Italy) Mattia Bellucci (Tunisia) Moez Echargui
May 30	Kiseljak, Bosnia and Herzegovina; Clay; M25; Singles and Doubles Draws	(Australia) Matthew Romios (Australia) Brandon Walkin; 3–6, 6–4, [10–6]	(Italy) Mattia Bellucci (Switzerland) Rémy Bertola	(Switzerland) Jakub Paul (Belgium) Raphaël Collignon	(Ukraine) Viacheslav Bielinskyi (Czech Republic) Michael Vrbenský (Italy) Mattia Bellucci (Tunisia) Moez Echargui
May 30	Harmon, Guam; Hard; M25; Singles and Doubles Draws	(South Korea) Hong Seong-chan; 6–3, 6–2	(Japan) Rio Noguchi	(Japan) Tatsuma Ito (South Korea) Kim Cheong-eui	(Japan) Takuto Niki (Japan) Takeru Yuzuki (Japan) Kaito Uesugi (South Korea) Nam Ji-sung
May 30	Harmon, Guam; Hard; M25; Singles and Doubles Draws	(Japan) Takuto Niki (Japan) Takeru Yuzuki; 6–1, 6–7^{(4–7)}, [11–9]	(South Korea) Hong Seong-chan (South Korea) Kim Cheong-eui	(Japan) Tatsuma Ito (South Korea) Kim Cheong-eui	(Japan) Takuto Niki (Japan) Takeru Yuzuki (Japan) Kaito Uesugi (South Korea) Nam Ji-sung
May 30	La Nucia, Spain; Clay; M25; Singles and Doubles Draws	(Dominican Republic) Nick Hardt; 6–0, 6–4	(France) Laurent Lokoli	(Spain) Daniel Rincón (Spain) Oriol Roca Batalla	(Spain) Jorge Martínez Martínez (United States) Alex Rybakov (Argentina) Facundo Juárez (United Kingdom) Anton Matusevich
May 30	La Nucia, Spain; Clay; M25; Singles and Doubles Draws	(Spain) Íñigo Cervantes (Spain) Oriol Roca Batalla; 6–2, 2–6, [13–11]	(Spain) Álvaro López San Martín (Spain) Àlex Martí Pujolràs	(Spain) Daniel Rincón (Spain) Oriol Roca Batalla	(Spain) Jorge Martínez Martínez (United States) Alex Rybakov (Argentina) Facundo Juárez (United Kingdom) Anton Matusevich
May 30	Chiang Rai, Thailand; Hard; M25; Singles and Doubles Draws	(Thailand) Kasidit Samrej; 6–3, 7–6^{(7–3)}	Konstantin Kravchuk	(Chinese Taipei) Hsu Yu-hsiou (Australia) Dayne Kelly	(Japan) Makoto Ochi (Japan) Shintaro Imai (New Zealand) Rubin Statham (China) Bu Yunchaokete
May 30	Chiang Rai, Thailand; Hard; M25; Singles and Doubles Draws	(Thailand) Congsup Congcar (Japan) Shintaro Imai; 6–4, 1–6, [10–8]	(Chinese Taipei) Hsu Yu-hsiou (China) Sun Fajing	(Chinese Taipei) Hsu Yu-hsiou (Australia) Dayne Kelly	(Japan) Makoto Ochi (Japan) Shintaro Imai (New Zealand) Rubin Statham (China) Bu Yunchaokete
May 30	Quito, Ecuador; Clay; M15; Singles and Doubles Draws	(Ecuador) Andrés Andrade; 6–3, 7–6^{(7–4)}	(Colombia) Nicolás Buitrago	(Argentina) Juan Bautista Otegui (New Zealand) Kiranpal Pannu	(Bolivia) Murkel Dellien (Peru) Jorge Panta (Brazil) Eduardo Ribeiro (Peru) Arklon Huertas del Pino
May 30	Quito, Ecuador; Clay; M15; Singles and Doubles Draws	(Bolivia) Murkel Dellien (Peru) Arklon Huertas del Pino; 6–3, 7–5	(Bolivia) Alejandro Mendoza (Peru) Jorge Panta	(Argentina) Juan Bautista Otegui (New Zealand) Kiranpal Pannu	(Bolivia) Murkel Dellien (Peru) Jorge Panta (Brazil) Eduardo Ribeiro (Peru) Arklon Huertas del Pino
May 30	Vaasa, Finland; Hard; M15; Singles and Doubles Draws	(Sweden) Karl Friberg; 4–6, 6–3, 6–1	Ivan Nedelko	(Finland) Aleksi Löfman (Estonia) Daniil Glinka	(Finland) Eero Vasa (Germany) Robert Strombachs (Switzerland) Luca Castelnuovo (Syria) Hazem Naw
May 30	Vaasa, Finland; Hard; M15; Singles and Doubles Draws	(Finland) Eero Vasa (Finland) Iiro Vasa; 6–3, 6–4	(Syria) Hazem Naw (Germany) Robert Strombachs	(Finland) Aleksi Löfman (Estonia) Daniil Glinka	(Finland) Eero Vasa (Germany) Robert Strombachs (Switzerland) Luca Castelnuovo (Syria) Hazem Naw
May 30	Heraklion, Greece; Hard; M15; Singles and Doubles Draws	(Australia) Omar Jasika; 6–2, 6–2	(Switzerland) Jérôme Kym	(Spain) Adrià Soriano Barrera (Georgia (country)) Aleksandre Bakshi	(Australia) Matthew Dellavedova (Germany) Oscar Moraing (Switzerland) Adrian Bodmer (Italy) Andrea Basso
May 30	Heraklion, Greece; Hard; M15; Singles and Doubles Draws	(Georgia (country)) Aleksandre Bakshi (Germany) Kai Lemstra; 7–6^{(7–3)}, 7–6^{(7–3)}	(Switzerland) Adrian Bodmer (Austria) Jonas Trinker	(Spain) Adrià Soriano Barrera (Georgia (country)) Aleksandre Bakshi	(Australia) Matthew Dellavedova (Germany) Oscar Moraing (Switzerland) Adrian Bodmer (Italy) Andrea Basso
May 30	Cancún, Mexico; Hard; M15; Singles and Doubles Draws	(United States) Ezekiel Clark; 6–3, 6–2	(Mexico) Luis Patiño	(China) Huang Haoyuan (United States) Alexander Bernard	(Luxembourg) Alex Knaff (Sweden) Arvid Nordquist (United States) Mwendwa Mbithi (India) Siddhant Banthia
May 30	Cancún, Mexico; Hard; M15; Singles and Doubles Draws	Doubles competition was abandoned due to ongoing poor weather		(China) Huang Haoyuan (United States) Alexander Bernard	(Luxembourg) Alex Knaff (Sweden) Arvid Nordquist (United States) Mwendwa Mbithi (India) Siddhant Banthia
May 30	Budva, Montenegro; Clay; M15; Singles and Doubles Draws	(Switzerland) Damien Wenger; 6–4, 6–4	(Bulgaria) Simon Anthony Ivanov	(France) Harold Mayot (Uzbekistan) Khumoyun Sultanov	(France) Timo Legout (Argentina) Mariano Navone (Australia) Tristan Schoolkate (Bulgaria) Gabriel Donev
May 30	Budva, Montenegro; Clay; M15; Singles and Doubles Draws	(Belgium) Simon Beaupain (Belgium) Loïc Cloes; 6–4, 6–7^{(3–7)}, [10–3]	(Bulgaria) Gabriel Donev (Bulgaria) Simon Anthony Ivanov	(France) Harold Mayot (Uzbekistan) Khumoyun Sultanov	(France) Timo Legout (Argentina) Mariano Navone (Australia) Tristan Schoolkate (Bulgaria) Gabriel Donev
May 30	Monastir, Tunisia; Hard; M15; Singles and Doubles Draws	(Tunisia) Aziz Dougaz; 6–4, 6–4	(Tunisia) Skander Mansouri	(France) Nicolas Tepmahc (Mexico) Alex Hernández	(China) Li Hanwen (Tunisia) Wissam Abderrahman (France) Sascha Gueymard Wayenburg (France) Arthur Bouquier
May 30	Monastir, Tunisia; Hard; M15; Singles and Doubles Draws	(United Kingdom) Luke Johnson (Tunisia) Skander Mansouri; 7–6^{(7–3)}, 6–3	(France) Arthur Bouquier (France) Martin Breysach	(France) Nicolas Tepmahc (Mexico) Alex Hernández	(China) Li Hanwen (Tunisia) Wissam Abderrahman (France) Sascha Gueymard Wayenburg (France) Arthur Bouquier
May 30	Rancho Santa Fe, United States; Hard; M15; Singles and Doubles Draws	(Denmark) August Holmgren; 6–4, 6–4	(United States) Gage Brymer	(Portugal) Duarte Vale (United States) Bjorn Swenson	(United States) Hudson Rivera (New Zealand) Ajeet Rai (Moldova) Alexander Cozbinov (Mexico) Lucas Gómez
May 30	Rancho Santa Fe, United States; Hard; M15; Singles and Doubles Draws	(Moldova) Alexander Cozbinov (Denmark) August Holmgren; 6–4, 6–7^{(3–7)}, [21–19]	(Ghana) Abraham Asaba (Australia) Mitchell Harper	(Portugal) Duarte Vale (United States) Bjorn Swenson	(United States) Hudson Rivera (New Zealand) Ajeet Rai (Moldova) Alexander Cozbinov (Mexico) Lucas Gómez
May 30	Tây Ninh, Vietnam; Hard; M15; Singles and Doubles Draws	(Vietnam) Lý Hoàng Nam; 6–3, 6–4	(Australia) Thomas Fancutt	(Japan) Ryota Tanuma (South Korea) Lee Jea-moon	(Japan) Shohei Chikami (Chinese Taipei) Huang Tsung-hao (Japan) Takuya Kumasaka (Chinese Taipei) Lo Chien-hsun
May 30	Tây Ninh, Vietnam; Hard; M15; Singles and Doubles Draws	(Japan) Kazuma Kawachi (Japan) Ryota Tanuma; 7–6^{(8–6)}, 6–2	(Vietnam) Phạm Minh Tuấn (Vietnam) Trịnh Linh Giang	(Japan) Ryota Tanuma (South Korea) Lee Jea-moon	(Japan) Shohei Chikami (Chinese Taipei) Huang Tsung-hao (Japan) Takuya Kumasaka (Chinese Taipei) Lo Chien-hsun

=== June ===
Week of	Tournament	Winner	Runners-up	Semifinalists	Quarterfinalists
June 6	Santo Domingo, Dominican Republic; Hard; M25; Singles and Doubles Draws	(Dominican Republic) Roberto Cid Subervi; 6–2, 6–3	(France) Dan Added	(Brazil) João Lucas Reis da Silva (Jamaica) John Chin	(United States) Alafia Ayeni (Portugal) Daniel Rodrigues (France) Raphaël Lambling (Colombia) Mateo Gómez
June 6	Santo Domingo, Dominican Republic; Hard; M25; Singles and Doubles Draws	(France) Dan Added (Brazil) João Lucas Reis da Silva; 6–4, 6–3	(United States) Jake Bhangdia (United States) Gabriel Evans	(Brazil) João Lucas Reis da Silva (Jamaica) John Chin	(United States) Alafia Ayeni (Portugal) Daniel Rodrigues (France) Raphaël Lambling (Colombia) Mateo Gómez
June 6	Harmon, Guam; Hard; M25; Singles and Doubles Draws	(Japan) Sho Shimabukuro; 3–6, 6–4, 6–1	(South Korea) Hong Seong-chan	(South Korea) Kim Cheong-eui (South Korea) Nam Ji-sung	(Japan) Kokoro Isomura (Japan) Rio Noguchi (Japan) Kaito Uesugi (Japan) Ko Suzuki
June 6	Harmon, Guam; Hard; M25; Singles and Doubles Draws	(Japan) Toshihide Matsui (Japan) Kaito Uesugi; 6–3, 0–6, [10–7]	(South Korea) Nam Ji-sung (South Korea) Song Min-kyu	(South Korea) Kim Cheong-eui (South Korea) Nam Ji-sung	(Japan) Kokoro Isomura (Japan) Rio Noguchi (Japan) Kaito Uesugi (Japan) Ko Suzuki
June 6	Skopje, North Macedonia; Clay; M25; Singles and Doubles Draws	(France) Laurent Lokoli; 6–2, 6–1	(Brazil) Orlando Luz	(Bulgaria) Petr Nesterov (Tunisia) Moez Echargui	(Uzbekistan) Khumoyun Sultanov (Belgium) Joris De Loore (Ukraine) Illya Beloborodko (Switzerland) Jakub Paul
June 6	Skopje, North Macedonia; Clay; M25; Singles and Doubles Draws	(Sweden) Simon Freund (Denmark) Johannes Ingildsen; 7–5, 6–3	(Sweden) Filip Bergevi (Tunisia) Moez Echargui	(Bulgaria) Petr Nesterov (Tunisia) Moez Echargui	(Uzbekistan) Khumoyun Sultanov (Belgium) Joris De Loore (Ukraine) Illya Beloborodko (Switzerland) Jakub Paul
June 6	Chiang Rai, Thailand; Hard; M25; Singles and Doubles Draws	(China) Bu Yunchaokete; 6–3, 7–5	(Japan) Shintaro Imai	(Turkey) Yankı Erel (Japan) Shinji Hazawa	(Chinese Taipei) Hsu Yu-hsiou; Konstantin Kravchuk (China) Sun Fajing (Japan) Yusuke Takahashi
June 6	Chiang Rai, Thailand; Hard; M25; Singles and Doubles Draws	(Japan) Yuki Mochizuki (Japan) Makoto Ochi; 6–2, 7–6^{(7–3)}	(Thailand) Yuttana Charoenphon (Thailand) Kasidit Samrej	(Turkey) Yankı Erel (Japan) Shinji Hazawa	(Chinese Taipei) Hsu Yu-hsiou; Konstantin Kravchuk (China) Sun Fajing (Japan) Yusuke Takahashi
June 6	East Lansing, United States; Hard; M25; Singles and Doubles Draws	(Canada) Gabriel Diallo; 6–3, 7–6^{(7–4)}	(United States) Andres Martin	(United States) Jacob Bickersteth (Japan) Shunsuke Mitsui	(United States) Noah Rubin (Canada) Liam Draxl (Canada) Joshua Lapadat (Japan) Naoki Nakagawa
June 6	East Lansing, United States; Hard; M25; Singles and Doubles Draws	(Japan) Shunsuke Mitsui (Japan) James Kent Trotter; 7–5, 6–3	(United States) Sekou Bangoura (United States) Noah Schachter	(United States) Jacob Bickersteth (Japan) Shunsuke Mitsui	(United States) Noah Rubin (Canada) Liam Draxl (Canada) Joshua Lapadat (Japan) Naoki Nakagawa
June 6	Sarajevo, Bosnia and Herzegovina; Clay; M15; Singles and Doubles Draws	(Slovenia) Bor Artnak; 6–1, 7–5	(Serbia) Stefan Popović	(Serbia) Dušan Obradović (Czech Republic) Michael Vrbenský	(Italy) Stefano Battaglino (Italy) Lorenzo Rottoli (Croatia) Domagoj Bilješko (Italy) Andrea Gola
June 6	Sarajevo, Bosnia and Herzegovina; Clay; M15; Singles and Doubles Draws	(Bulgaria) Alexander Donski (Austria) David Pichler; 5–7, 7–6^{(7–2)}, [12–10]	(France) Constantin Bittoun Kouzmine (Czech Republic) Michael Vrbenský	(Serbia) Dušan Obradović (Czech Republic) Michael Vrbenský	(Italy) Stefano Battaglino (Italy) Lorenzo Rottoli (Croatia) Domagoj Bilješko (Italy) Andrea Gola
June 6	Quito, Ecuador; Clay; M15; Singles and Doubles Draws	(Bolivia) Murkel Dellien; 6–3, 6–2	(Argentina) Juan Bautista Otegui	(Venezuela) Ricardo Rodríguez-Pace (Chile) Matías Soto	(Argentina) Matías Franco Descotte (Peru) Jorge Panta (Argentina) Tomás Farjat (Brazil) Eduardo Ribeiro
June 6	Quito, Ecuador; Clay; M15; Singles and Doubles Draws	(Colombia) Juan Sebastián Gómez (Colombia) Juan Sebastián Osorio; 7–6^{(7–5)}, 7–6^{(7–2)}	(Chile) Diego Fernández Flores (Chile) Matías Soto	(Venezuela) Ricardo Rodríguez-Pace (Chile) Matías Soto	(Argentina) Matías Franco Descotte (Peru) Jorge Panta (Argentina) Tomás Farjat (Brazil) Eduardo Ribeiro
June 6	Frascati, Italy; Clay; M15; Singles and Doubles Draws	(Brazil) José Pereira; 6–3, 6–0	(Italy) Manuel Mazza	(Zimbabwe) Benjamin Lock (Italy) Stefano Napolitano	(Italy) Davide Galoppini (Portugal) Jaime Faria (Georgia (country)) Aleksandre Metreveli (Argentina) Franco Emanuel Egea
June 6	Frascati, Italy; Clay; M15; Singles and Doubles Draws	(France) Alexandre Reco (France) Luca Sanchez; 6–0, 6–7^{(4–7)}, [10–7]	(Italy) Niccolò Ciavarella (Italy) Daniele Minighini	(Zimbabwe) Benjamin Lock (Italy) Stefano Napolitano	(Italy) Davide Galoppini (Portugal) Jaime Faria (Georgia (country)) Aleksandre Metreveli (Argentina) Franco Emanuel Egea
June 6	Budva, Montenegro; Clay; M15; Singles and Doubles Draws	(Belgium) Christopher Heyman; 4–6, 6–3, 6–1	(Switzerland) Damien Wenger	(Italy) Lorenzo Claverie (Romania) Ștefan Paloși	(Bulgaria) Gabriel Donev; Savriyan Danilov; Ivan Liutarevich (Montenegro) Rrezart Cungu
June 6	Budva, Montenegro; Clay; M15; Singles and Doubles Draws	(Switzerland) Louroi Martinez (Switzerland) Damien Wenger; 6–4, 6–3	Bogdan Bobrov; Ivan Liutarevich	(Italy) Lorenzo Claverie (Romania) Ștefan Paloși	(Bulgaria) Gabriel Donev; Savriyan Danilov; Ivan Liutarevich (Montenegro) Rrezart Cungu
June 6	Bytom, Poland; Clay; M15; Singles and Doubles Draws	(Germany) Timo Stodder; 2–6, 6–2, 7–5	(Ukraine) Georgii Kravchenko	(Czech Republic) David Poljak (Poland) Szymon Kielan	(Austria) Lukas Krainer (Poland) Aleksander Orlikowski (Czech Republic) Jakub Menšík (Republic of Ireland) Michael Agwi
June 6	Bytom, Poland; Clay; M15; Singles and Doubles Draws	(Czech Republic) Jakub Menšík (Poland) Olaf Pieczkowski; 7–6^{(7–3)}, 7–5	(Australia) Matthew Romios (Australia) Brandon Walkin	(Czech Republic) David Poljak (Poland) Szymon Kielan	(Austria) Lukas Krainer (Poland) Aleksander Orlikowski (Czech Republic) Jakub Menšík (Republic of Ireland) Michael Agwi
June 6	Córdoba, Spain; Clay; M15; Singles and Doubles Draws	(Spain) Carlos López Montagud; 6–2, 6–1	(Spain) Alberto Barroso Campos	(Ukraine) Eric Vanshelboim (Spain) Imanol López Morillo	(Peru) Ignacio Buse (France) Jules Marie; Svyatoslav Gulin (Spain) Bruno Pujol Navarro
June 6	Córdoba, Spain; Clay; M15; Singles and Doubles Draws	(Spain) Alejandro García (Spain) Mario Mansilla Díez; Walkover	(Uruguay) Francisco Llanes (Chile) Miguel Fernando Pereira	(Ukraine) Eric Vanshelboim (Spain) Imanol López Morillo	(Peru) Ignacio Buse (France) Jules Marie; Svyatoslav Gulin (Spain) Bruno Pujol Navarro
June 6	Monastir, Tunisia; Hard; M15; Singles and Doubles Draws	(Tunisia) Aziz Dougaz; 7–6^{(7–5)}, 6–0	(Tunisia) Skander Mansouri	(France) Jaimee Floyd Angele (China) Li Hanwen	Igor Kudriashov (France) Quentin Folliot (China) Zhang Ze (France) Arthur Bouquier
June 6	Monastir, Tunisia; Hard; M15; Singles and Doubles Draws	(China) Zhang Ze (China) Zheng Baoluo; 6–3, 6–4	(Burundi) Guy Orly Iradukunda (Tunisia) Aziz Ouakaa	(France) Jaimee Floyd Angele (China) Li Hanwen	Igor Kudriashov (France) Quentin Folliot (China) Zhang Ze (France) Arthur Bouquier
June 6	San Diego, United States; Hard; M15; Singles and Doubles Draws	(Portugal) Duarte Vale; 4–6, 7–6^{(9–7)}, 7–5	(United States) Nathan Ponwith	(United States) Ryan Seggerman (China) Li Zhe	(United States) Gage Brymer (United States) Learner Tien (Romania) Gabi Adrian Boitan (United States) Eric Hadigian
June 6	San Diego, United States; Hard; M15; Singles and Doubles Draws	(United States) Jacob Brumm (Czech Republic) Tadeáš Paroulek; 0–6, 6–2, [11–9]	(India) Siddhant Banthia (Japan) Yuta Kikuchi	(United States) Ryan Seggerman (China) Li Zhe	(United States) Gage Brymer (United States) Learner Tien (Romania) Gabi Adrian Boitan (United States) Eric Hadigian
June 6	Tây Ninh, Vietnam; Hard; M15; Singles and Doubles Draws	(Vietnam) Lý Hoàng Nam; 7–6^{(7–3)}, 6–2	(Czech Republic) Dominik Palán	(Australia) Aaron Addison (United States) Kyle Seelig	(India) S D Prajwal Dev (South Korea) Lee Jea-moon (Japan) Ryota Tanuma (South Korea) Park Ui-sung
June 6	Tây Ninh, Vietnam; Hard; M15; Singles and Doubles Draws	(Philippines) Francis Alcantara (Vietnam) Lý Hoàng Nam; 6–3, 6–1	(South Korea) Park Ui-sung (South Korea) Son Ji-hoon	(Australia) Aaron Addison (United States) Kyle Seelig	(India) S D Prajwal Dev (South Korea) Lee Jea-moon (Japan) Ryota Tanuma (South Korea) Park Ui-sung
June 13	Santo Domingo, Dominican Republic; Hard; M25; Singles and Doubles Draws	(United States) Martin Damm; 6–3, 6–3	(France) Dan Added	(United States) Aidan Mayo (Dominican Republic) Peter Bertran	(Republic of Ireland) Osgar O'Hoisin (United States) Nick Chappell (Mexico) Alan Fernando Rubio Fierros (South Korea) Chung Yun-seong
June 13	Santo Domingo, Dominican Republic; Hard; M25; Singles and Doubles Draws	(United States) William Bushamuka (China) Hua Runhao; 6–4, 6–4	(Dominican Republic) Peter Bertran (Antigua and Barbuda) Jody Maginley	(United States) Aidan Mayo (Dominican Republic) Peter Bertran	(Republic of Ireland) Osgar O'Hoisin (United States) Nick Chappell (Mexico) Alan Fernando Rubio Fierros (South Korea) Chung Yun-seong
June 13	Grasse, France; Clay; M25; Singles and Doubles Draws	(Spain) Pol Martín Tiffon; 7–6^{(7–5)}, 6–7^{(6–8)}, 7–5	(Italy) Mattia Bellucci	(France) Mathys Erhard (Israel) Yshai Oliel	(France) Mehdi Sadaoui (France) Émilien Voisin; Alexey Vatutin (France) Kyrian Jacquet
June 13	Grasse, France; Clay; M25; Singles and Doubles Draws	(Spain) Álvaro López San Martín (Spain) Pol Martín Tiffon; 7–5, 6–3	(Argentina) Mariano Kestelboim (Israel) Yshai Oliel	(France) Mathys Erhard (Israel) Yshai Oliel	(France) Mehdi Sadaoui (France) Émilien Voisin; Alexey Vatutin (France) Kyrian Jacquet
June 13	Martos, Spain; Hard; M25; Singles and Doubles Draws	(Spain) Alberto Barroso Campos; 6–4, 6–2	(France) Jules Marie	(Spain) Carlos Sánchez Jover (Spain) Daniel Mérida	(Poland) Paweł Ciaś (Australia) James McCabe (Spain) Pedro Ródenas (Spain) Benjamín Winter López
June 13	Martos, Spain; Hard; M25; Singles and Doubles Draws	(Australia) James Frawley (Australia) Akira Santillan; 6–7^{(7–9)}, 6–3, [10–6]	(Spain) Adrià Soriano Barrera (Spain) Benjamín Winter López	(Spain) Carlos Sánchez Jover (Spain) Daniel Mérida	(Poland) Paweł Ciaś (Australia) James McCabe (Spain) Pedro Ródenas (Spain) Benjamín Winter López
June 13	Wichita, United States; Hard; M25; Singles and Doubles Draws	(France) Clément Chidekh; 6–2, 6–2	(Canada) Liam Draxl	(Kazakhstan) Denis Yevseyev (Chinese Taipei) Hsu Yu-hsiou	(Kazakhstan) Beibit Zhukayev (New Zealand) Isaac Becroft (United States) Felix Corwin (Japan) Yuta Shimizu
June 13	Wichita, United States; Hard; M25; Singles and Doubles Draws	(Chinese Taipei) Hsu Yu-hsiou (Japan) Yuta Shimizu; 6–4, 2–6, [10–5]	(Ghana) Abraham Asaba (United States) Sekou Bangoura	(Kazakhstan) Denis Yevseyev (Chinese Taipei) Hsu Yu-hsiou	(Kazakhstan) Beibit Zhukayev (New Zealand) Isaac Becroft (United States) Felix Corwin (Japan) Yuta Shimizu
June 13	Duffel, Belgium; Clay; M15; Singles and Doubles Draws	(Belgium) Gauthier Onclin; 6–4, 6–3	(Luxembourg) Chris Rodesch	(Romania) Cezar Crețu (Australia) Philip Sekulic	(Republic of Ireland) Simon Carr (France) Amaury Raynel (Belgium) Christopher Heyman (Belgium) Buvaysar Gadamauri
June 13	Duffel, Belgium; Clay; M15; Singles and Doubles Draws	(Luxembourg) Alex Knaff (Luxembourg) Chris Rodesch; 6–1, 6–4	(Argentina) Franco Emanuel Egea (Brazil) Marcelo Zormann	(Romania) Cezar Crețu (Australia) Philip Sekulic	(Republic of Ireland) Simon Carr (France) Amaury Raynel (Belgium) Christopher Heyman (Belgium) Buvaysar Gadamauri
June 13	Quito, Ecuador; Clay; M15; Singles and Doubles Draws	(Chile) Matías Soto; 6–3, 7–6^{(7–3)}	(Chile) Diego Fernández Flores	(Venezuela) Ricardo Rodríguez-Pace (New Zealand) Kiranpal Pannu	(Argentina) Luciano Emanuel Ambrogi (Ecuador) Álvaro Guillén Meza (Bolivia) Alejandro Mendoza (Canada) Juan Carlos Aguilar
June 13	Quito, Ecuador; Clay; M15; Singles and Doubles Draws	(Brazil) João Victor Couto Loureiro (Brazil) Eduardo Ribeiro; 6–3, 6–2	(Venezuela) Brandon Pérez (Venezuela) Ricardo Rodríguez-Pace	(Venezuela) Ricardo Rodríguez-Pace (New Zealand) Kiranpal Pannu	(Argentina) Luciano Emanuel Ambrogi (Ecuador) Álvaro Guillén Meza (Bolivia) Alejandro Mendoza (Canada) Juan Carlos Aguilar
June 13	Ra'anana, Israel; Hard; M15; Singles and Doubles Draws	(Germany) Robert Strombachs; 7–6^{(7–4)}, 6–4	(Israel) Edan Leshem	(United Kingdom) Giles Hussey (Israel) Sahar Simon	(France) Nicolas Tepmahc (United States) Emil Reinberg (Switzerland) Luca Castelnuovo (Israel) Ben Patael
June 13	Ra'anana, Israel; Hard; M15; Singles and Doubles Draws	(Switzerland) Adrian Bodmer (Switzerland) Luca Castelnuovo; 6–4, 6–3	(Latvia) Kārlis Ozoliņš (Germany) Robert Strombachs	(United Kingdom) Giles Hussey (Israel) Sahar Simon	(France) Nicolas Tepmahc (United States) Emil Reinberg (Switzerland) Luca Castelnuovo (Israel) Ben Patael
June 13	Chieti, Italy; Clay; M15; Singles and Doubles Draws	(Italy) Riccardo Balzerani; 6–3, 1–6, 6–3	Andrey Chepelev	(Italy) Gianmarco Ferrari (Slovenia) Tomás Lipovšek Puches	(Germany) Sebastian Prechtel (Italy) Tommaso Compagnucci (Italy) Pietro Pampanin (Italy) Andrea Picchione
June 13	Chieti, Italy; Clay; M15; Singles and Doubles Draws	(Italy) Giorgio Tabacco (Italy) Francesco Vilardo; 6–3, 6–3	(Italy) Jacopo Bilardo (Italy) Gianmarco Gandolfi	(Italy) Gianmarco Ferrari (Slovenia) Tomás Lipovšek Puches	(Germany) Sebastian Prechtel (Italy) Tommaso Compagnucci (Italy) Pietro Pampanin (Italy) Andrea Picchione
June 13	Skopje, North Macedonia; Clay; M15; Singles and Doubles Draws	(Romania) Ștefan Paloși; 6–4, 1–6, 6–3	(Brazil) Orlando Luz	Bogdan Bobrov (Romania) Sebastian Gima	(Argentina) Juan Pablo Paz (Uzbekistan) Khumoyun Sultanov (Italy) Samuel Vincent Ruggeri (Tunisia) Moez Echargui
June 13	Skopje, North Macedonia; Clay; M15; Singles and Doubles Draws	(United States) Trey Hilderbrand (Romania) Bogdan Pavel; 7–6^{(8–6)}, 6–2	(Romania) Ștefan Paloși (Moldova) Ilya Snițari	Bogdan Bobrov (Romania) Sebastian Gima	(Argentina) Juan Pablo Paz (Uzbekistan) Khumoyun Sultanov (Italy) Samuel Vincent Ruggeri (Tunisia) Moez Echargui
June 13	Chiang Rai, Thailand; Hard; M15; Singles and Doubles Draws	(Japan) Shintaro Imai; 7–5, 6–4	(China) Bu Yunchaokete	(Thailand) Thantub Suksumrarn (China) Sun Fajing	(Thailand) Palaphoom Kovapitukted; Konstantin Kravchuk (New Zealand) Rubin Statham (Thailand) Thanapet Chanta
June 13	Chiang Rai, Thailand; Hard; M15; Singles and Doubles Draws	(Thailand) Pruchya Isaro (Thailand) Thantub Suksumrarn; 4–6, 6–3, [10–6]	(Japan) Yuki Mochizuki (Japan) Makoto Ochi	(Thailand) Thantub Suksumrarn (China) Sun Fajing	(Thailand) Palaphoom Kovapitukted; Konstantin Kravchuk (New Zealand) Rubin Statham (Thailand) Thanapet Chanta
June 13	Monastir, Tunisia; Hard; M15; Singles and Doubles Draws	(Tunisia) Aziz Dougaz; 7–6^{(7–4)}, 6–3	(Tunisia) Skander Mansouri	(China) Zhang Ze (France) Quentin Folliot	(Japan) Keisuke Saitoh (China) Te Rigele (Egypt) Karim-Mohamed Maamoun (France) Arthur Bouquier
June 13	Monastir, Tunisia; Hard; M15; Singles and Doubles Draws	(Tunisia) Skander Mansouri (Tunisia) Aziz Ouakaa; 7–6^{(7–1)}, 6–2	(China) Te Rigele (China) Zhang Ze	(China) Zhang Ze (France) Quentin Folliot	(Japan) Keisuke Saitoh (China) Te Rigele (Egypt) Karim-Mohamed Maamoun (France) Arthur Bouquier
June 13	San Diego, United States; Hard; M15; Singles and Doubles Draws	(United States) Ethan Quinn; 3–6, 7–6^{(9–7)}, 7–6^{(7–4)}	(Denmark) August Holmgren	(United States) Alex Michelsen (Japan) Yuta Kikuchi	(Czech Republic) Tadeáš Paroulek (Syria) Kareem Al Allaf (Portugal) Duarte Vale (United States) Siem Woldeab
June 13	San Diego, United States; Hard; M15; Singles and Doubles Draws	(China) Li Zhe (Chinese Taipei) Yang Tsung-hua; 6–4, 3–6, [10–8]	(United States) Ethan Quinn (United States) Siem Woldeab	(United States) Alex Michelsen (Japan) Yuta Kikuchi	(Czech Republic) Tadeáš Paroulek (Syria) Kareem Al Allaf (Portugal) Duarte Vale (United States) Siem Woldeab
June 13	Tây Ninh, Vietnam; Hard; M15; Singles and Doubles Draws	(Vietnam) Lý Hoàng Nam; 4–6, 7–5, 6–4	(India) Digvijay Pratap Singh	(Australia) Thomas Fancutt (Chinese Taipei) Huang Tsung-hao	(Japan) Takuya Kumasaka (South Korea) Lee Jea-moon (Vietnam) Vũ Hà Minh Đức (Vietnam) Nguyễn Văn Phương
June 13	Tây Ninh, Vietnam; Hard; M15; Singles and Doubles Draws	(Japan) Shohei Chikami (Japan) Masamichi Imamura; 7–5, 6–1	(Vietnam) Lê Quốc Khánh (Vietnam) Lý Hoàng Nam	(Australia) Thomas Fancutt (Chinese Taipei) Huang Tsung-hao	(Japan) Takuya Kumasaka (South Korea) Lee Jea-moon (Vietnam) Vũ Hà Minh Đức (Vietnam) Nguyễn Văn Phương
June 20	Arlon, Belgium; Clay; M25; Singles and Doubles Draws	(Belgium) Raphaël Collignon; 6–4, 6–1	(Belgium) Gauthier Onclin	(United States) Oliver Crawford (Belgium) Simon Beaupain	(Belgium) Buvaysar Gadamauri (Germany) Kai Wehnelt (France) Maxime Chazal (Belgium) Alexander Hoogmartens
June 20	Arlon, Belgium; Clay; M25; Singles and Doubles Draws	(India) Anirudh Chandrasekar (India) Vijay Sundar Prashanth; 7–6^{(7–5)}, 6–4	(Germany) Constantin Frantzen (Germany) Tim Sandkaulen	(United States) Oliver Crawford (Belgium) Simon Beaupain	(Belgium) Buvaysar Gadamauri (Germany) Kai Wehnelt (France) Maxime Chazal (Belgium) Alexander Hoogmartens
June 20	Montauban, France; Clay; M25; Singles and Doubles Draws	(France) Timo Legout; 6–3, 3–6, 6–4	(France) Giovanni Mpetshi Perricard	(France) Jurgen Briand; Mikalai Haliak	(France) Kenny de Schepper (France) Robin Bertrand (France) Ugo Blanchet (France) Harold Mayot
June 20	Montauban, France; Clay; M25; Singles and Doubles Draws	(France) Ugo Blanchet (France) Arthur Reymond; 6–3, 6–3	(Spain) Iñaki Cabrera Bello (United States) Bruno Kuzuhara	(France) Jurgen Briand; Mikalai Haliak	(France) Kenny de Schepper (France) Robin Bertrand (France) Ugo Blanchet (France) Harold Mayot
June 20	Mungia, Spain; Clay (indoor); M25; Singles and Doubles Draws	(Spain) Iñaki Montes de la Torre; 6–3, 7–5	(Australia) Akira Santillan	Syvatoslav Gulin (Spain) Benjamín Winter López	(France) Thomas Deschamps (Republic of Ireland) Simon Carr (United States) Garrett Johns (Australia) Philip Sekulic
June 20	Mungia, Spain; Clay (indoor); M25; Singles and Doubles Draws	(Spain) Àlex Martínez (Spain) Iñaki Montes de la Torre; 7–6^{(7–5)}, 3–6, [10–7]	(Spain) Jorge Martínez Martínez (Spain) David Pérez Sanz	Syvatoslav Gulin (Spain) Benjamín Winter López	(France) Thomas Deschamps (Republic of Ireland) Simon Carr (United States) Garrett Johns (Australia) Philip Sekulic
June 20	Klosters, Switzerland; Clay; M25; Singles and Doubles Draws	(Italy) Mattia Bellucci; 6–3, 6–2	(Austria) Lukas Neumayer	(Switzerland) Rémy Bertola (Romania) Ștefan Paloși	(Switzerland) Damien Wenger (Austria) Sandro Kopp (Germany) Nico Hornitschek (Switzerland) Jeffrey von der Schulenburg
June 20	Klosters, Switzerland; Clay; M25; Singles and Doubles Draws	(Switzerland) Rémy Bertola (Switzerland) Jakub Paul; 6–4, 7–5	(Austria) Lukas Neumayer (Italy) Alexander Weis	(Switzerland) Rémy Bertola (Romania) Ștefan Paloși	(Switzerland) Damien Wenger (Austria) Sandro Kopp (Germany) Nico Hornitschek (Switzerland) Jeffrey von der Schulenburg
June 20	Tulsa, United States; Hard; M25; Singles and Doubles Draws	(United States) Govind Nanda; 6–3, 7–5	(United States) Stefan Dostanic	(United States) Andres Martin (Japan) Sho Shimabukuro	(United States) Murphy Cassone (United States) Hunter Heck (United States) Omni Kumar (Australia) Dane Sweeny
June 20	Tulsa, United States; Hard; M25; Singles and Doubles Draws	(Chinese Taipei) Hsu Yu-hsiou (Australia) Dane Sweeny; 6–3, 6–2	(United States) Ezekiel Clark (United States) Nathan Ponwith	(United States) Andres Martin (Japan) Sho Shimabukuro	(United States) Murphy Cassone (United States) Hunter Heck (United States) Omni Kumar (Australia) Dane Sweeny
June 20	Kamen, Germany; Clay; M15; Singles and Doubles Draws	(Germany) Rudolf Molleker; 6–1, 6–4	(Austria) David Pichler	(Germany) Jeremy Jahn (Poland) Szymon Kielan	(Germany) Peter Heller (Germany) Sebastian Prechtel; Yan Sabanin (Austria) Lukas Krainer
June 20	Kamen, Germany; Clay; M15; Singles and Doubles Draws	(Ukraine) Illya Beloborodko (Ukraine) Volodymyr Uzhylovskyi; Walkover	(Argentina) Franco Emanuel Egea (Argentina) Gabriel Alejandro Hidalgo	(Germany) Jeremy Jahn (Poland) Szymon Kielan	(Germany) Peter Heller (Germany) Sebastian Prechtel; Yan Sabanin (Austria) Lukas Krainer
June 20	Ra'anana, Israel; Hard; M15; Singles and Doubles Draws	(Israel) Ben Patael; 3–6, 6–3, 6–1	(Israel) Orel Kimhi	(Israel) Edan Leshem (Switzerland) Adrian Bodmer	(United Kingdom) Brandon Murphy (Israel) Lior Goldenberg (United States) Samir Banerjee (Germany) Robert Strombachs
June 20	Ra'anana, Israel; Hard; M15; Singles and Doubles Draws	(United Kingdom) Giles Hussey (United Kingdom) Ben Jones; 6–4, 6–2	(France) Robin Catry (Australia) Timothy Gray	(Israel) Edan Leshem (Switzerland) Adrian Bodmer	(United Kingdom) Brandon Murphy (Israel) Lior Goldenberg (United States) Samir Banerjee (Germany) Robert Strombachs
June 20	Alkmaar, Netherlands; Clay; M15; Singles and Doubles Draws	(Spain) Daniel Rincón; 7–5, 6–1	(Italy) Jacopo Berrettini	(Netherlands) Michiel de Krom (Sweden) Karl Friberg	(France) Mathys Erhard (Italy) Luigi Sorrentino (Netherlands) Max Houkes (Spain) José Francisco Vidal Azorín
June 20	Alkmaar, Netherlands; Clay; M15; Singles and Doubles Draws	(Bulgaria) Alexander Donski (Sweden) Karl Friberg; 3–6, 3–3, ret.	(Czech Republic) Patrik Rikl (Czech Republic) Matěj Vocel	(Netherlands) Michiel de Krom (Sweden) Karl Friberg	(France) Mathys Erhard (Italy) Luigi Sorrentino (Netherlands) Max Houkes (Spain) José Francisco Vidal Azorín
June 20	Chiang Rai, Thailand; Hard; M15; Singles and Doubles Draws	(China) Bu Yunchaokete; 6–1, 6–4	(China) Cui Jie	(New Zealand) Rubin Statham (Thailand) Yuttana Charoenphon	(Thailand) Jirat Navasirisomboon (Thailand) Kasidit Samrej (Japan) Makoto Ochi (China) Sun Fajing
June 20	Chiang Rai, Thailand; Hard; M15; Singles and Doubles Draws	(Thailand) Pruchya Isaro (Thailand) Thantub Suksumrarn; 6–4, 6–4	(India) Rishi Reddy (India) Parikshit Somani	(New Zealand) Rubin Statham (Thailand) Yuttana Charoenphon	(Thailand) Jirat Navasirisomboon (Thailand) Kasidit Samrej (Japan) Makoto Ochi (China) Sun Fajing
June 20	Monastir, Tunisia; Hard; M15; Singles and Doubles Draws	(France) Térence Atmane; 6–3, 7–6^{(7–4)}	(France) Cyril Vandermeersch	(Tunisia) Aziz Dougaz (China) Wang Xiaofei	(China) Te Rigele (Chinese Taipei) Ray Ho (Canada) Dan Martin (Tunisia) Aziz Ouakaa
June 20	Monastir, Tunisia; Hard; M15; Singles and Doubles Draws	(China) Te Rigele (China) Zhang Ze; 5–7, 6–1, [11–9]	(Italy) Gabriele Bosio (Italy) Gabriele Maria Noce	(Tunisia) Aziz Dougaz (China) Wang Xiaofei	(China) Te Rigele (Chinese Taipei) Ray Ho (Canada) Dan Martin (Tunisia) Aziz Ouakaa
June 20	South Bend, United States; Hard; M15; Singles and Doubles Draws	(United Kingdom) Johannus Monday; 6–3, 7–5	(United States) Sekou Bangoura	(United States) James Tracy (United States) Ryan Shane	(United States) Patrick Kypson (United States) Strong Kirchheimer (United States) Perry Gregg (United States) Felix Corwin
June 20	South Bend, United States; Hard; M15; Singles and Doubles Draws	(India) Siddhant Banthia (Japan) James Kent Trotter; 6–2, 7–6^{(7–3)}	(United States) Felix Corwin (United States) Noah Schachter	(United States) James Tracy (United States) Ryan Shane	(United States) Patrick Kypson (United States) Strong Kirchheimer (United States) Perry Gregg (United States) Felix Corwin
June 27	Bourg-en-Bresse, France; Clay; M25; Singles and Doubles Draws	(France) Ugo Blanchet; 6–4, 7–6^{(7–4)}	(United States) Oliver Crawford	(France) Timo Legout (Germany) Kai Wehnelt	(United Kingdom) Anton Matusevich (Germany) Tim Handel (United States) Bruno Kuzuhara (Germany) Patrick Zahraj
June 27	Bourg-en-Bresse, France; Clay; M25; Singles and Doubles Draws	(Germany) Kai Wehnelt (Germany) Patrick Zahraj; 6–4, 6–4	(Chinese Taipei) Ray Ho (Ukraine) Eric Vanshelboim	(France) Timo Legout (Germany) Kai Wehnelt	(United Kingdom) Anton Matusevich (Germany) Tim Handel (United States) Bruno Kuzuhara (Germany) Patrick Zahraj
June 27	The Hague, Netherlands; Clay; M25; Singles and Doubles Draws	(Spain) Daniel Rincón; 7–6^{(8–6)}, 4–6, 6–1	(Netherlands) Jelle Sels	(Netherlands) Michiel de Krom (Netherlands) Deney Wassermann	(Belgium) Christopher Heyman (Netherlands) Dax Donders (Belgium) Buvaysar Gadamauri (Netherlands) Max Houkes
June 27	The Hague, Netherlands; Clay; M25; Singles and Doubles Draws	(Brazil) Orlando Luz (Brazil) Marcelo Zormann; 7–6^{(7–5)}, 2–6, [11–9]	(Australia) James Frawley (Australia) Akira Santillan	(Netherlands) Michiel de Krom (Netherlands) Deney Wassermann	(Belgium) Christopher Heyman (Netherlands) Dax Donders (Belgium) Buvaysar Gadamauri (Netherlands) Max Houkes
June 27	Poprad, Slovakia; Clay; M25; Singles and Doubles Draws	(Germany) Louis Wessels; 6–4, 6–3	(Romania) Ștefan Paloși	(Czech Republic) Patrik Rikl (Hungary) Gergely Madarász	(Denmark) Johannes Ingildsen (Romania) Vlad Andrei Dancu (Hungary) Mátyás Füle (Czech Republic) David Poljak
June 27	Poprad, Slovakia; Clay; M25; Singles and Doubles Draws	(Sweden) Simon Freund (Denmark) Johannes Ingildsen; 6–4, 6–2	(Slovakia) Miloš Karol (Slovakia) Lukáš Pokorný	(Czech Republic) Patrik Rikl (Hungary) Gergely Madarász	(Denmark) Johannes Ingildsen (Romania) Vlad Andrei Dancu (Hungary) Mátyás Füle (Czech Republic) David Poljak
June 27	Bakio, Spain; Hard; M25; Singles and Doubles Draws	(Czech Republic) Dominik Palán; 6–7^{(4–7)}, 6–4, 7–6^{(7–4)}	(Spain) Alejandro Moro Cañas	(Spain) Àlex Martínez (United States) Dali Blanch	(United Kingdom) Oscar Weightman (Spain) John Echeverría (Turkey) Kuzey Çekirge (Israel) Ben Patael
June 27	Bakio, Spain; Hard; M25; Singles and Doubles Draws	(United Kingdom) Luke Johnson (Tunisia) Skander Mansouri; 1–6, 6–2, [10–5]	(Israel) Aaron Cohen (Spain) Àlex Martínez	(Spain) Àlex Martínez (United States) Dali Blanch	(United Kingdom) Oscar Weightman (Spain) John Echeverría (Turkey) Kuzey Çekirge (Israel) Ben Patael
June 27	Dallas, United States; Hard; M25; Singles and Doubles Draws	(Chinese Taipei) Hsu Yu-hsiou; 7–5, 6–3	(Romania) Gabi Adrian Boitan	(Japan) Sho Shimabukuro (United States) Omni Kumar	(Australia) Li Tu (Australia) Dane Sweeny (United States) Ezekiel Clark (Japan) Shuichi Sekiguchi
June 27	Dallas, United States; Hard; M25; Singles and Doubles Draws	(United States) Govind Nanda (United States) Tyler Zink; 6–4, 6–4	(Chinese Taipei) Hsu Yu-hsiou (Australia) Dane Sweeny	(Japan) Sho Shimabukuro (United States) Omni Kumar	(Australia) Li Tu (Australia) Dane Sweeny (United States) Ezekiel Clark (Japan) Shuichi Sekiguchi
June 27	Bergamo, Italy; Clay; M15; Singles and Doubles Draws	(Ukraine) Oleksandr Ovcharenko; 6–3, 6–4	(Italy) Gianmarco Ferrari	(Argentina) Mariano Kestelboim (Italy) Andrea Picchione	(Italy) Andrea Basso (Italy) Riccardo Balzerani (Italy) Giovanni Oradini (Italy) Alexander Weis
June 27	Bergamo, Italy; Clay; M15; Singles and Doubles Draws	(Italy) Enrico Dalla Valle (Italy) Julian Ocleppo; 6–3, 7–6^{(7–3)}	(Argentina) Juan Ignacio Galarza (Slovenia) Tomás Lipovšek Puches	(Argentina) Mariano Kestelboim (Italy) Andrea Picchione	(Italy) Andrea Basso (Italy) Riccardo Balzerani (Italy) Giovanni Oradini (Italy) Alexander Weis
June 27	Wrocław, Poland; Clay; M15; Singles and Doubles Draws	(Poland) Maks Kaśnikowski; 6–4, 3–6, 6–4	(Czech Republic) Petr Nouza	(Czech Republic) Václav Šafránek (Poland) Maciej Rajski	(Sweden) Leo Borg (Spain) Max Alcalá Gurri (Poland) Szymon Kielan (Poland) Yann Wójcik
June 27	Wrocław, Poland; Clay; M15; Singles and Doubles Draws	(Spain) Max Alcalá Gurri (Spain) Bruno Pujol Navarro; 6–4, 7–5	(Czech Republic) Jiří Barnat (Czech Republic) Filip Duda	(Czech Republic) Václav Šafránek (Poland) Maciej Rajski	(Sweden) Leo Borg (Spain) Max Alcalá Gurri (Poland) Szymon Kielan (Poland) Yann Wójcik
June 27	Belgrade, Serbia; Clay; M15; Singles and Doubles Draws	(Croatia) Duje Kekez; 1–6, 6–2, 7–5	(Romania) Nicolae Frunză	(Georgia (country)) Aleksandre Metreveli (Montenegro) Rrezart Cungu	(Serbia) Dušan Obradović (Serbia) Stefan Popović (Georgia (country)) Aleksandre Bakshi (Romania) Călin Manda
June 27	Belgrade, Serbia; Clay; M15; Singles and Doubles Draws	Yan Bondarevskiy; Marat Sharipov; 6–1, 6–4	(Serbia) Viktor Jović (France) Luka Pavlovic	(Georgia (country)) Aleksandre Metreveli (Montenegro) Rrezart Cungu	(Serbia) Dušan Obradović (Serbia) Stefan Popović (Georgia (country)) Aleksandre Bakshi (Romania) Călin Manda
June 27	Bern, Switzerland; Clay; M15; Singles and Doubles Draws	(Czech Republic) Michael Vrbenský; 6–2, 6–3	(Germany) Sebastian Prechtel	(Switzerland) Mirko Martinez (Italy) Stefano Battaglino	(France) Maxime Chazal (Germany) Christoph Negritu (Germany) Niklas Schell (Germany) Liam Gavrielides
June 27	Bern, Switzerland; Clay; M15; Singles and Doubles Draws	(Canada) Juan Carlos Aguilar (Switzerland) Jeffrey von der Schulenburg; 6–4, 7–5	(Switzerland) Mirko Martinez (Switzerland) Luca Stäheli	(Switzerland) Mirko Martinez (Italy) Stefano Battaglino	(France) Maxime Chazal (Germany) Christoph Negritu (Germany) Niklas Schell (Germany) Liam Gavrielides
June 27	Monastir, Tunisia; Hard; M15; Singles and Doubles Draws	(France) Térence Atmane; 6–2, 6–2	(France) Cyril Vandermeersch	(France) Mathieu Scaglia (France) Enzo Wallart	(France) Robin Bertrand (Serbia) Boris Butulija (France) Gleb Sakharov (Poland) Paweł Ciaś
June 27	Monastir, Tunisia; Hard; M15; Singles and Doubles Draws	(China) Dong Bohua (China) Zhang Ze; 6–1, 6–4	(Thailand) Maximus Jones (China) Zheng Baoluo	(France) Mathieu Scaglia (France) Enzo Wallart	(France) Robin Bertrand (Serbia) Boris Butulija (France) Gleb Sakharov (Poland) Paweł Ciaś
June 27	Los Angeles, United States; Hard; M15; Singles and Doubles Draws	(United States) Zachary Svajda; 7–5, 6–4	(United States) Brandon Holt	(United States) Gage Brymer (China) Fnu Nidunjianzan	(France) Jaimee Floyd Angele (United States) Kyle Kang (United States) Alfredo Perez (South Africa) Khololwam Montsi
June 27	Los Angeles, United States; Hard; M15; Singles and Doubles Draws	(United States) Ethan Quinn (Paraguay) Daniel Vallejo; 7–5, 6–4	(United States) Aidan Mayo (United States) Keenan Mayo	(United States) Gage Brymer (China) Fnu Nidunjianzan	(France) Jaimee Floyd Angele (United States) Kyle Kang (United States) Alfredo Perez (South Africa) Khololwam Montsi
