= 2023 Stockholm Open – Singles =

Singles
- 2023 Stockholm Open

Final
- Champion: (France) Gaël Monfils
- Runner-up: Pavel Kotov
- Score: 4–6, 7–6^{(8–6)}, 6–3

Details
- Draw: 28 (4 Q / 3 WC)
- Seeds: 8

Events
| Singles | Doubles |
- Stockholm Open

Gaël Monfils defeated Pavel Kotov in the final, 4–6, 7–6^{(8–6)}, 6–3 to win the singles tennis title at the 2023 Stockholm Open. It was his 12th career ATP Tour singles title. At 37 years-old he became the oldest champion in the history of the tournament.

Holger Rune was the defending champion, but lost to Miomir Kecmanović in the second round.

== Seeds ==
The top four seeds received a bye into the second round.

1. (Denmark) Holger Rune (second round)
2. (France) Adrian Mannarino (quarterfinals)
3. (Netherlands) Tallon Griekspoor (quarterfinals)
4. (Spain) Alejandro Davidovich Fokina (withdrew)
5. (Argentina) Sebastián Báez (first round)
6. (Czech Republic) Jiří Lehečka (first round)
7. (United States) Christopher Eubanks (first round)
8. (United Kingdom) Dan Evans (first round)

== Draw ==
Key

- Q = Qualifier
- WC = Wild card
- LL = Lucky loser
- Alt = Alternate
- ITF = ITF entry
- PR = Protected ranking
- SR = Special ranking
- SE = Special exempt
- JE = Junior exempt
- JR = Junior Accelerator Programme entrant
- CO = College Accelerator Programme entrant
- NG = Next Gen Accelerator Program entrant
- w/o = Walkover
- r = Retired
- d = Defaulted

=== Finals ===
Semifinals
(Serbia) Miomir Kecmanović | 3 | 4
Q | Pavel Kotov | 6 | 6
(Serbia) Laslo Djere | 5 | 2
PR | (France) Gaël Monfils | 7 | 6

Final
Q | Pavel Kotov | 6 | 6^{6} | 3
PR | (France) Gaël Monfils | 4 | 7^{8} | 6

=== Top half ===
First round
(Serbia) M Kecmanović | 6 | 6
WC | (Sweden) K Friberg | 4 | 2
WC | (Sweden) E Ymer | 6 | 6
(Spain) R Bautista Agut | 4 | 4
Q | (Croatia) D Prižmić | 6 | 7
6 | (Czech Republic) J Lehečka | 3 | 5
(Finland) E Ruusuvuori | 6 | 6
Q | (Lebanon) B Hassan | 2 | 1
(Serbia) D Lajović | 6 | 3 | 4
(Italy) L Sonego | 4 | 6 | 6
Q | P Kotov | 6^{2} | 6 | 7^{7}
7 | (United States) C Eubanks | 7^{7} | 3 | 6^{5}

Second round
1 | (Denmark) H Rune | 6^{3} | 2
(Serbia) M Kecmanović | 7^{7} | 6
WC | (Sweden) E Ymer | 6 | 3 | 6
Q | (Croatia) D Prižmić | 3 | 6 | 2
3 | (Netherlands) T Griekspoor | 7^{7} | 6
(Finland) E Ruusuvuori | 6^{3} | 4
(Italy) L Sonego | 4 | 5
Q | P Kotov | 6 | 7

Quarterfinals
(Serbia) M Kecmanović | 6 | 3
WC | (Sweden) E Ymer | 0 | 2^{r}
3 | (Netherlands) T Griekspoor | 6^{4} | 2
Q | P Kotov | 7^{7} | 6

Semifinals
(Serbia) M Kecmanović | 3 | 4
Q | P Kotov | 6 | 6

=== Bottom half ===
First round
5 | (Argentina) S Báez | 6^{5} | 2
(United States) JJ Wolf | 7^{7} | 6
(Serbia) L Djere | 6 | 6
WC | (Sweden) L Borg | 3 | 3
(Croatia) B Gojo | 5 | 4
(Switzerland) S Wawrinka | 7 | 6
8 | (United Kingdom) D Evans | 4 | 6^{1}
Q | (Austria) F Misolic | 6 | 7^{7}
PR | (France) G Monfils | 2 | 6 | 7
(Hungary) M Fucsovics | 6 | 2 | 5
(Brazil) T Seyboth Wild | 3 | 2
R Safiullin | 6 | 6

Second round
(United States) JJ Wolf | 5 | 4
(Serbia) L Djere | 7 | 6
(Switzerland) S Wawrinka | 4 | 1
LL | (Czech Republic) T Macháč | 6 | 6
Q | (Austria) F Misolic | 4 | 3
PR | (France) G Monfils | 6 | 6
R Safiullin | 4 | 4
2 | (France) A Mannarino | 6 | 6

Quarterfinals
(Serbia) L Djere | 5 | 7^{7} | 6
LL | (Czech Republic) T Macháč | 7 | 6^{5} | 4
PR | (France) G Monfils | 7 | 7^{7}
2 | (France) A Mannarino | 5 | 6^{3}

Semifinals
(Serbia) L Djere | 5 | 2
PR | (France) G Monfils | 7 | 6

== Qualifying ==
=== Seeds ===
1. (Czech Republic) Tomáš Macháč (qualifying competition, lucky loser)
2. Pavel Kotov (qualified)
3. (United Kingdom) Liam Broady (qualifying competition)
4. (Moldova) Radu Albot (qualifying competition)
5. (Finland) Otto Virtanen (qualifying competition)
6. (Kazakhstan) Timofey Skatov (first round)
7. (Italy) Andrea Vavassori (first round)
8. (Switzerland) Leandro Riedi (first round)

=== Qualifiers ===
1. (Croatia) Dino Prižmić
2. Pavel Kotov
3. (Austria) Filip Misolic
4. (Lebanon) Benjamin Hassan

=== Lucky loser ===
1. (Czech Republic) Tomáš Macháč

=== Qualifying draw ===
==== First qualifier ====
First round
1 | (Czech Republic) Tomáš Macháč | 6 | 6
(Croatia) Duje Ajduković | 4 | 4
(Croatia) Dino Prižmić | 6 | 6
6 | (Kazakhstan) Timofey Skatov | 0 | 1

Qualifying competition
1 | (Czech Republic) Tomáš Macháč | 6^{4} | 7^{7} | 3
(Croatia) Dino Prižmić | 7^{7} | 6^{3} | 6

==== Second qualifier ====
First round
2 | Pavel Kotov | 6 | 7^{7}
(Ukraine) Vitaliy Sachko | 4 | 6^{4}
(Bosnia and Herzegovina) Damir Džumhur | 4 | 7^{7} | 6^{3}
5 | (Finland) Otto Virtanen | 6 | 6^{2} | 7^{7}

Qualifying competition
2 | Pavel Kotov | 6 | 6
5 | (Finland) Otto Virtanen | 4 | 4

==== Third qualifier ====
First round
3 | (United Kingdom) Liam Broady | 4 | 6 | 6
WC | (Sweden) Sebastian Eriksson | 6 | 3 | 4
(Austria) Filip Misolic | 7 | 6
8 | (Switzerland) Leandro Riedi | 5 | 3

Qualifying competition
3 | (United Kingdom) Liam Broady | 3 | 3
(Austria) Filip Misolic | 6 | 6

==== Fourth qualifier ====
First round
4 | (Moldova) Radu Albot | 6 | 6
WC | (Sweden) Jonathan Mridha | 4 | 2
Alt | (Lebanon) Benjamin Hassan | 6^{5} | 7^{7} | 7^{7}
7 | (Italy) Andrea Vavassori | 7^{7} | 6^{5} | 6^{5}

Qualifying competition
4 | (Moldova) Radu Albot | 6 | 4 | 3
Alt | (Lebanon) Benjamin Hassan | 3 | 6 | 6
