= 2023 Stockholm Open – Doubles =

Doubles
- 2023 Stockholm Open

Final
- Champions: (Kazakhstan) Andrey Golubev (Ukraine) Denys Molchanov
- Runners-up: (India) Yuki Bhambri (United Kingdom) Julian Cash
- Score: 7–6^{(10–8)}, 6–2

Events
Singles	Doubles
- Stockholm Open

Andrey Golubev and Denys Molchanov defeated Yuki Bhambri and Julian Cash in the final, 7–6^{(10–8)}, 6–2 to win the doubles tennis title at the 2023 Stockholm Open.

Marcelo Arévalo and Jean-Julien Rojer were the reigning champions, but chose to compete in Tokyo instead.

== Seeds ==
1. (Argentina) Máximo González / (Argentina) Andrés Molteni (first round)
2. (Serbia) Nikola Ćaćić / (Croatia) Mate Pavić (first round)
3. (France) Sadio Doumbia / (France) Fabien Reboul (first round, retired)
4. (United States) Robert Galloway / (France) Albano Olivetti (semifinals)

== Draw ==
Key

- Q = Qualifier
- WC = Wild card
- LL = Lucky loser
- Alt = Alternate
- ITF = ITF entry
- PR = Protected ranking
- SR = Special ranking
- SE = Special exempt
- JE = Junior exempt
- JR = Junior Accelerator Programme entrant
- CO = College Accelerator Programme entrant
- NG = Next Gen Accelerator Program entrant
- w/o = Walkover
- r = Retired
- d = Defaulted

=== Draw ===
First round
1	(Argentina) M González (Argentina) A Molteni	5	6	[7]
(Kazakhstan) A Golubev (Ukraine) D Molchanov	7	3	[10]
(Ecuador) G Escobar (Kazakhstan) A Nedovyesov	6^{3}	4
(Portugal) F Cabral (United Kingdom) H Patten	7^{7}	6
4	(United States) R Galloway (France) A Olivetti	7	6
WC	(Sweden) F Bergevi (Sweden) L Borg	5	3
(Italy) L Sonego (Italy) A Vavassori	6	6^{4}	[10]
(Colombia) N Barrientos (Sweden) A Göransson	4	7^{7}	[4]
WC	(Sweden) K Friberg (Sweden) J Mridha	6	4	[5]
(Argentina) S Báez (Brazil) T Seyboth Wild	4	6	[10]
(Netherlands) T Griekspoor (Netherlands) B Stevens	4	0
3	(France) S Doumbia (France) F Reboul	6	0^{r}
(Finland) H Heliövaara (Finland) P Niklas-Salminen	6	6
(Brazil) M Demoliner (Brazil) R Matos	3	4
(India) Y Bhambri (United Kingdom) J Cash	6	6
2	(Serbia) N Ćaćić (Croatia) M Pavić	4	3

Quarterfinals
(Kazakhstan) A Golubev (Ukraine) D Molchanov	7^{7}	6^{3}	[10]
(Portugal) F Cabral (United Kingdom) H Patten	6^{4}	7^{7}	[8]
4	(United States) R Galloway (France) A Olivetti	7^{7}	6
(Italy) L Sonego (Italy) A Vavassori	6^{4}	3
(Argentina) S Báez (Brazil) T Seyboth Wild
(Netherlands) T Griekspoor (Netherlands) B Stevens	w/o
(Finland) H Heliövaara (Finland) P Niklas-Salminen	1	3
(India) Y Bhambri (United Kingdom) J Cash	6	6

Semifinals
(Kazakhstan) A Golubev (Ukraine) D Molchanov	7	6
4	(United States) R Galloway (France) A Olivetti	5	2
(Netherlands) T Griekspoor (Netherlands) B Stevens	7^{10}	3	[3]
(India) Y Bhambri (United Kingdom) J Cash	6^{8}	6	[10]

Final
(Kazakhstan) A Golubev (Ukraine) D Molchanov	7^{10}	6
(India) Y Bhambri (United Kingdom) J Cash	6^{8}	2
