= 2023 Stockholm Open =

Men's tennis tournament

- Date: 16–22 October
- Edition: 54th
- Category: ATP Tour 250 series
- Draw: 28S / 16D
- Prize money: €673,630
- Surface: Hard (indoor)
- Location: Stockholm, Sweden
- Venue: Kungliga tennishallen

Champions

Singles
- (France) Gaël Monfils

Doubles
- (Kazakhstan) Andrey Golubev / (Ukraine) Denys Molchanov
- Stockholm Open

The 2023 BNP Paribas Nordic Open was a professional men's tennis tournament played on indoor hard courts. It was the 54th edition of the tournament, and part of the ATP Tour 250 series of the 2023 ATP Tour. It took place at the Kungliga tennishallen in Stockholm, Sweden from 16 to 22 October 2023.

== Champions ==
=== Singles ===
- (France) Gaël Monfils def. Pavel Kotov, 4–6, 7–6^{(8–6)}, 6–3

=== Doubles ===
- (Kazakhstan) Andrey Golubev / (Ukraine) Denys Molchanov def. (India) Yuki Bhambri / (United Kingdom) Julian Cash, 7–6^{(10–8)}, 6–2

== Singles main-draw entrants ==
=== Seeds ===
Country	Player	Rank^{1}	Seed
DEN	Holger Rune	5	1
FRA	Adrian Mannarino	23	2
NED	Tallon Griekspoor	24	3
~~ESP~~	~~Alejandro Davidovich Fokina~~	~~25~~	~~4~~
ARG	Sebastián Báez	29	5
CZE	Jiří Lehečka	30	6
USA	Christopher Eubanks	32	7
GBR	Dan Evans	33	8

- Rankings are as of 2 October 2023.

=== Other entrants ===
The following players received wildcards into the singles main draw:

- (Sweden) Leo Borg
- (Sweden) Karl Friberg
- (Sweden) Elias Ymer

The following player received entry using a protected ranking:

- (France) Gaël Monfils

The following players received entry from the qualifying draw:

- (Lebanon) Benjamin Hassan
- Pavel Kotov
- (Austria) Filip Misolic
- (Croatia) Dino Prižmić

The following player received entry as a lucky loser:

- (Czech Republic) Tomáš Macháč

=== Withdrawals ===
- (Spain) Alejandro Davidovich Fokina → replaced by (Czech Republic) Tomáš Macháč

== Doubles main-draw entrants ==
=== Seeds ===
Country	Player	Country	Player	Rank^{1}	Seed
ARG	Máximo González	ARG	Andrés Molteni	20	1
SRB	Nikola Ćaćić	CRO	Mate Pavić	85	2
FRA	Sadio Doumbia	FRA	Fabien Reboul	85	3
USA	Robert Galloway	FRA	Albano Olivetti	104	4

- Rankings are as of 2 October 2023

=== Other entrants ===
The following pairs received wildcards into the doubles main draw:

- (Sweden) Filip Bergevi / (Sweden) Leo Borg
- (Sweden) Karl Friberg / (Sweden) Jonathan Mridha

=== Withdrawals ===
- (Italy) Simone Bolelli / (Italy) Andrea Vavassori → replaced by (Italy) Lorenzo Sonego / (Italy) Andrea Vavassori
