= Karl Friberg =

Swedish tennis player

- Country (sports): Sweden
- Residence: Stockholm, Sweden
- Born: 25 March 1999 (age 27) Örebro, Sweden
- Height: 1.91 m (6 ft 3 in)
- Plays: Right-handed (two-handed backhand)
- Prize money: US $117,705

Singles
- Career record: 0–3 (at ATP Tour level, Grand Slam level, and in Davis Cup)
- Career titles: 0
- Highest ranking: No. 355 (19 June 2023)
- Current ranking: No. 814 (19 October 2026)

Doubles
- Career record: 0–2 (at ATP Tour level, Grand Slam level, and in Davis Cup)
- Career titles: 0
- Highest ranking: No. 690 (26 June 2023)
- Current ranking: No. 1,003 (19 October 2026)
- Last updated on: 19 October 2026.

Karl Friberg (born 25 March 1999) is a Swedish tennis player. Friberg has a career high ATP singles ranking of No. 355 achieved on 19 June 2023 and a doubles ranking of No. 690 achieved on 26 June 2023.

== Career ==
Friberg made his ATP main draw debut at the 2021 Stockholm Open after entering the doubles main draw as an alternate with Mohamed Safwat.

He received a wildcard for the 2023 Stockholm Open partnering Jonathan Mridha.

== ITF Futures Titles ==
=== Singles: (5) ===
No.	Date	Tournament	Tier	Surface	Opponent	Score
1.	Aug 2018	Helsinki, Finland F3	Futures	Clay	(Finland) Otto Virtanen	6–4, 6–1
2.	May 2022	M15 Vaasa, Finland	World Tennis Tour	Hard	Ivan Nedelko	4–6, 6–3, 6–1
3.	Aug 2022	M15 Frederiksberg, Denmark	World Tennis Tour	Clay	(France) Maxime Chazal	6–7^{(4–7)}, 6–3, 6–3
4.	Sep 2022	M15 Danderyd, Sweden	World Tennis Tour	Clay	(Croatia) Vito Tonejc	6–4, 7–6^{(10–8)}
5.	Jun 2023	M15 Vaasa, Finland	World Tennis Tour	Hard	(Finland) Patrick Kaukovalta	6–0, 6–4

=== Doubles: (2) ===
No.	Date	Tournament	Tier	Surface	Partner	Opponents	Score
1.	Aug 2019	M15 Ystad, Sweden	World Tennis Tour	Clay	(Sweden) Sam Taylor	(Sweden) Markus Eriksson (Sweden) Simon Freund	6–7^{(4–7)}, 7–5, [10–4]
2.	Jun 2022	M15 Alkmaar, Netherlands	World Tennis Tour	Clay	(Bulgaria) Alexander Donski	(Czech Republic) Patrik Rikl (Czech Republic) Matěj Vocel	3–6, 3–3, ret.
