= Leo Borg =

Swedish tennis player

- Full name: Leo Karl Borg
- Country (sports): Sweden
- Residence: Stockholm, Sweden
- Born: 15 May 2003 (age 23) Stockholm, Sweden
- Height: 1.83 m (6 ft 0 in)
- Plays: Right-handed (two-handed backhand)
- Coach: Rickard Billing, Patrik Eriksson
- Prize money: US $177,533

Singles
- Career record: 5–12
- Career titles: 0
- Highest ranking: No. 334 (11 September 2023)
- Current ranking: No. 599 (9 November 2026)

Doubles
- Career record: 0–7
- Career titles: 0
- Highest ranking: No. 1,033 (26 June 2023)
- Current ranking: No. 1,188 (9 November 2026)

Team competitions
- Davis Cup: RR (2023)
- Last updated on: 9 November 2026.

Leo Karl Borg (Swedish pronunciation: [ˈbɔrj]; born 15 May 2003) is a Swedish tennis player. He has a career-high singles ranking of world No. 334 achieved on 11 September 2023 and a doubles ranking of No. 1,033 achieved on 26 June 2023. He is the current No. 3 Swedish singles player.

== Personal info ==
He is the son of 11-time Grand Slam champion and former world No. 1, Björn Borg.

== Junior career ==
Borg excelled on the ITF Junior Circuit, defeating world No. 1 junior Bruno Kuzuhara in the final of the Porto Alegre in Brazil, one of the top junior tournaments, in March 2021. Borg also qualified for and played in the 2021 junior majors, including Wimbledon. His junior ranking peaked at world No. 12 on 15 March 2021.

== Professional career ==
=== 2021: ATP Tour debut ===
Borg received a number of wildcards in ATP Challenger events and ATP Tour qualifying and main events and competed regularly on the ITF World Tour. He made his ATP Tour main-draw debut at the 2021 Stockholm Open as a wildcard, where he lost in the first round to eventual champion Tommy Paul.

=== 2022: Maiden ITF Tour title ===
On September 11, 2022 he made his first professional final on the ITF Tour in Cairo, Egypt, after which his ATP ranking jumped to No. 581.

Ranked No. 577 at the 2022 Stockholm Open as a wildcard, he played world No. 31, Tommy Paul, again in the first round, this time losing in three sets, 7–5, 4–6, 1–6.

On October 30 2022, Borg won his first professional title on the ITF Tour in Sharm El Sheikh, Egypt.

Borg made the largest leap in the world tennis rankings of any professional player in the calendar year 2022, moving over 1500 spots and ending the year at world No. 507.

=== 2023-2024: First ATP Tour win ===
In July 2023, Borg received a wildcard at the Båstad Open, where he won his first match at ATP Tour level by defeating fellow Swede Elias Ymer in the first round, in straight sets.

He also received a wildcard for the singles draw of the 2023 Stockholm Open in singles and doubles.

In July 2024, Borg was given a wildcard entry into the 2024 Swedish Open in Båstad where he played Rafael Nadal in the first round, losing 6–3, 6–4.

=== 2025: First ATP win at home in Stockholm ===
In October, Borg recorded his second ATP Tour win and first win at home, over Sebastian Ofner, at the 2025 Stockholm Open, after receiving a wildcard for the main draw. It was his best career win by ranking thus far.

== Singles performance timeline ==
Key
W	F	SF	QF	#R	RR	Q#	P#	DNQ	A	Z#	PO	G	S	B	NMS	NTI	P	NH

(W) winner; (F) finalist; (SF) semifinalist; (QF) quarterfinalist; (#R) rounds 4, 3, 2, 1; (RR) round-robin stage; (Q#) qualification round; (DNQ) did not qualify; (A) absent; (NH) not held; (SR) strike rate (events won / competed); (W–L) win–loss record.
To avoid confusion and double counting, these charts are updated at the conclusion of a tournament or when the player's participation has ended.

Current through the 2026 Stockholm Open.

Tournament	2021	2022	2023	2024	2025	2026	SR	W–L
Grand Slam tournaments
Australian Open	A	A	A	A	A	A	0 / 0	0–0
French Open	A	A	A	A	A	A	0 / 0	0–0
Wimbledon	A	A	A	A	A	A	0 / 0	0–0
US Open	A	A	A	A	A	A	0 / 0	0–0
National representation
Davis Cup	A	A	RR	G1	G1	A	0 / 1	3–5
Career statistics
Tournaments	1	1	2	2	1	1	8	
Overall win–loss	0–1	0–1	1–5	1–2	3–3	0–1	5–13	
Year-end ranking	2216	513	396	546	549			

== ITF World Tour finals ==
=== Singles: 11 (7 titles, 4 runner-ups) ===
Finals by surface
Hard (7–2)
Clay (0–2)

Result	W–L	Date	Tournament	Surface	Opponent	Score
Loss	0–1	Sep 2022	M25 Cairo, Egypt	Clay	(Argentina) Leonardo Aboian	3–6, 4–6
Win	1–1	Oct 2022	M15 Sharm El Sheikh, Egypt	Hard	(Slovenia) Bor Artnak	3–6, 7–5, 6–4
Win	2–1	Apr 2023	M25 Jakarta, Indonesia	Hard	(South Korea) Lee Jea-moon	6–4, 6–4
Loss	2–2	Jun 2023	M25 Risskov, Denmark	Clay	(Denmark) Elmer Møller	3–6, 3–6
Loss	2–3	Aug 2023	M25 Jakarta, Indonesia	Hard	(France) Arthur Weber	6–4, 5–7, 5–7
Win	3–3	Aug 2023	M25 Jakarta, Indonesia	Hard	(Australia) Blake Mott	6–2, 6–0
Win	4–3	May 2024	M15 Kingston, Jamaica	Hard	(United States) Corey Craig	3–6, 6–4, 6–4
Win	5–3	Aug 2024	M25 Nakhon Si Thammarat, Thailand	Hard	(Japan) Taisei Ichikawa	6–4, 6–7^{(6–8)}, 6–3
Loss	5–4	Oct 2024	M15 Sharm El Sheikh, Egypt	Hard	Petr Bar Biryukov	5–7, 4–6
Win	6–4	Jan 2025	M15 Doha, Qatar	Hard	(Belgium) Tibo Colson	6–1, 3–6, 7–6^{(7–5)}
Win	7–4	Mar 2026	M15 Ahmedabad, India	Hard	(India) Sidharth Rawat	7–6^{(11–9)}, 6-1

=== Doubles: 1 (1 runner-up) ===
Result	W–L	Date	Tournament	Surface	Partner	Opponents	Score
Loss	0–1	May 2024	M15 Kingston, Jamaica	Hard	(India) Aryan Shah	(Antigua and Barbuda) Jody Maginley (United States) Joshua Sheehy	6–4, 5–7, [2–10]
