= Jonathan Mridha =

Swedish tennis player

- Country (sports): Sweden
- Residence: Stockholm, Sweden
- Born: 8 April 1995 (age 31) Stockholm, Sweden
- Height: 1.83 m (6 ft 0 in)
- Turned pro: Peter Carlsson
- Plays: Right-handed (two handed-backhand)
- Prize money: US $98,887

Singles
- Career record: 1–1 (at ATP Tour level, Grand Slam level, and in Davis Cup)
- Career titles: 0
- Highest ranking: No. 444 (7 March 2022)
- Current ranking: No. 1,134 (14 September 2026)

Doubles
- Career record: 1–2 (at ATP Tour level, Grand Slam level, and in Davis Cup)
- Career titles: 0
- Highest ranking: No. 508 (9 May 2016)
- Current ranking: No. 1,152 (14 September 2026)

Team competitions
- Davis Cup: 1–1
- Last updated on: 16 September 2026.

Jonathan Mridha (born 8 April 1995) is a Swedish tennis player of Bangladeshi descent. He has a career high ATP singles ranking of No. 444 achieved on 7 March 2022 and a career high ATP doubles ranking of No. 508 achieved on 9 May 2016.

== Career ==
Mridha made his ATP main draw doubles debut at the 2015 Swedish Open partnering Fred Simonsson where they reached the quarterfinals.

He received a wildcard for the 2023 Stockholm Open partnering Karl Friberg.

== National Representation ==
Mridha represents Sweden at the Davis Cup, where he has a W/L record of 1–1. He made his debut at the 2018 Davis Cup World Group play-offs against Switzerland. In his first match he lost against Henri Laaksonen. Two days later he played the decider match against Sandro Ehrat and won the match in four sets.

== Challenger and ITF Futures/World Tennis Tour finals ==
=== Singles: 5 (4–1) ===
Legend (singles) ATP Challenger Tour (0–0) ITF Futures/World Tennis Tour (4–1)	Titles by surface Hard (0–0) Clay (4–1) Grass (0–0) Carpet (0–0)

Result	W–L	Date	Tournament	Tier	Surface	Opponent	Score
Win	1–0	Jul 2017	Czech Republic F4, Ústí nad Orlicí	Futures	Clay	(Czech Republic) Marek Jaloviec	6–3, 6–4
Loss	1–1	Aug 2017	Finland F1, Kaarina	Futures	Clay	(France) Axel Michon	3–6, 6–4, 1–6
Win	2–1	Jun 2019	M15, Plovdiv, Bulgaria	World Tennis Tour	Clay	(Chile) Bastián Malla	6–3, 6–3
Win	3–1	Aug 2021	M15, Frederiksberg, Denmark	World Tennis Tour	Clay	(Sweden) Markus Eriksson	6–3, 7–6^{(7–5)}
Win	4–1	Feb 2022	M15, Naples, Florida, U.S.	World Tennis Tour	Clay	(United States) Evan Zhu	6-2, 7-6^{(7-4)}

=== Doubles 7 (5–2) ===
Legend (doubles) ATP Challenger Tour (0–0) ITF Futures Tour (5–2)	Titles by surface Hard (2–0) Clay (3–2) Grass (0–0) Carpet (0–0)

Result	W–L	Date	Tournament	Tier	Surface	Partner	Opponents	Score
Win	1–0	May 2015	Sweden F2, Båstad	Futures	Clay	(Sweden) Fred Simonsson	(Sweden) Daniel Appelgren (Sweden) Mikael Ymer	6–1, 6–7^{(5–7)}, [10–7]
Win	2–0	May 2015	Sweden F3, Båstad	Futures	Clay	(Sweden) Fred Simonsson	(Sweden) Serdar Bojadjieva (Romania) Dragoș Nicolae Mădăraș	7–6^{(7–4)}, 6–2
Loss	2–1	Jun 2015	Croatia F12, Bol	Futures	Clay	(Sweden) Fred Simonsson	(Australia) Maverick Banes (Australia) Gavin van Peperzeel	w/o
Loss	2–2	Sep 2019	Jounieh, Lebanon	M25	Clay	(Sweden) Eric Ahren Moonga	(France) Corentin Denolly (France) Jonathan Eysseric	7–6^{(7–4)}, 6–7^{(2–7)}, [7–10]
Win	3–2	Oct 2019	Antalya, Turkey	M15	Clay	(Sweden) Gustav Hansson	(Russia) Alexander Ovcharov (Russia) Alexander Shevchenko	6–3, 6–4
Win	4–2	Oct 2019	Meshref, Kuwait	M15	Hard	(Switzerland) Antoine Bellier	(Ukraine) Yurii Dzhavakian (Belarus) Mikalai Haliak	6–1, 6–4
Win	5–2	Dec 2019	Doha, Qatar	M15	Hard	(Sweden) Simon Freund	(Belgium) Zizou Bergs (Georgia (country)) Zura Tkemaladze	6–1, 6–0

== Davis Cup ==
=== Participations: (1–1) ===
Group membership World Group (0–0) Qualifying Round (0–0) WG Play-off (1–1) Group I (0–0) Group II (0–0) Group III (0–0) Group IV (0–0)	Matches by surface Hard (1–1) Clay (0–0) Grass (0–0) Carpet (0–0)	Matches by type Singles (1–1) Doubles (0–0)

- ▲ ▼ indicates the outcome of the Davis Cup match followed by the score, date, place of event, the zonal classification and its phase, and the court surface.

Rubber outcome	No.	Rubber	Match type (partner if any)	Opponent nation	Opponent player(s)	Score
▲3–2; 14–16 September 2018; Swiss Tennis Arena, Biel, Switzerland; World Group Play-off; Hard (i) surface
Defeat	1	II	Singles	Switzerland	Henri Laaksonen	6–7^{(5–7)}, 2–6, 3–6
Victory	2	V	Singles	Switzerland	Sandro Ehrat	4–6, 6–3, 6–4, 7–6^{(7–4)}

== See also ==
- List of Sweden Davis Cup team representatives
