= 2024 Kachreti Challenger – Doubles =

Doubles
- 2024 Kachreti Challenger

Final
- Champions: (United Kingdom) Charles Broom (United Kingdom) Ben Jones
- Runners-up: Evgeny Karlovskiy; Evgenii Tiurnev
- Score: 3–6, 6–1, [10–8]

Events
Singles	Doubles
Kachreti Challenger	· 2025 →

This was the first edition of the tournament.

Charles Broom and Ben Jones won the title after defeating Evgeny Karlovskiy and Evgenii Tiurnev 3–6, 6–1, [10–8] in the final.

== Seeds ==
1. (United Kingdom) Charles Broom / (United Kingdom) Ben Jones (champions)
2. (New Zealand) Finn Reynolds / (New Zealand) Rubin Statham (semifinals)
3. (Thailand) Pruchya Isaro / (Canada) Kelsey Stevenson (quarterfinals)
4. (Spain) Alberto Barroso Campos / (Dominican Republic) Roberto Cid Subervi (first round)

== Draw ==
=== Key ===
- Q = Qualifier
- WC = Wild card
- LL = Lucky loser
- Alt = Alternate
- ITF = ITF entry
- PR = Protected ranking
- SR = Special ranking
- SE = Special exempt
- JE = Junior exempt
- JR = Junior Accelerator Programme entrant
- CO = College Accelerator Programme entrant
- NG = Next Gen Accelerator Program entrant
- w/o = Walkover
- r = Retired
- d = Defaulted

=== Draw ===
First round
1	(United Kingdom) C Broom (United Kingdom) B Jones	6	7
(Poland) Martyn Pawelski (Latvia) R Strombachs	1	5
Alt	(Estonia) D Glinka (Estonia) Karl Kiur Saar	7^{7}	4	[5]
(United Kingdom) James Davis (United Kingdom) G Hussey	6^{4}	6	[10]
3	(Thailand) P Isaro (Canada) K Stevenson	6	6
(Kazakhstan) G Lomakin (Ukraine) Vadym Ursu	4	3
B Bobrov; Aleksandr Lobanov	3	2
(Turkey) Y Erel (India) R Ramanathan	6	6
E Karlovskiy; E Tiurnev	3	7^{7}	[10]
(France) R Bertrand (Japan) Ryuki Matsuda	6	6^{5}	[6]
E Agafonov; I Simakin	6	3	[10]
4	(Spain) A Barroso Campos (Dominican Republic) R Cid Subervi	4	6	[4]
WC	(Georgia (country)) S Purtseladze (Georgia (country)) Z Tkemaladze	4	3
WC	(Georgia (country)) A Bakshi (Georgia (country)) A Metreveli	6	6
(Turkey) A Çelikbilek (Turkey) C İlkel	5	2
2	(New Zealand) F Reynolds (New Zealand) R Statham	7	6

Quarterfinals
1	(United Kingdom) C Broom (United Kingdom) B Jones	6^{5}	7^{7}	[10]
(United Kingdom) J Davis (United Kingdom) G Hussey	7^{7}	6^{4}	[8]
3	(Thailand) P Isaro (Canada) K Stevenson	3	7^{14}	[7]
(Turkey) Y Erel (India) R Ramanathan	6	6^{12}	[10]
E Karlovskiy; E Tiurnev	6	6^{5}	[12]
E Agafonov; I Simakin	4	7^{7}	[10]
WC	(Georgia (country)) A Bakshi (Georgia (country)) A Metreveli	6	3	[5]
2	(New Zealand) F Reynolds (New Zealand) R Statham	4	6	[10]

Semifinals
1	(United Kingdom) C Broom (United Kingdom) B Jones	7	7^{8}
(Turkey) Y Erel (India) R Ramanathan	5	6^{6}
E Karlovskiy; E Tiurnev	6	6
2	(New Zealand) F Reynolds (New Zealand) R Statham	4	3

Final
1	(United Kingdom) C Broom (United Kingdom) B Jones	3	6	[10]
E Karlovskiy; E Tiurnev	6	1	[8]
