= 2025 Mziuri Cup – Doubles =

Doubles
- 2025 Mziuri Cup

Final
- Champions: (Japan) Masamichi Imamura (Japan) Naoki Tajima
- Runners-up: (India) Siddhant Banthia (India) Ramkumar Ramanathan
- Score: 1–6, 6–3, [10–5]

Events
Singles	Doubles
- Mziuri Cup

Charles Broom and Ben Jones were the defending champions but only Broom chose to defend his title, partnering Alastair Gray. They lost in the quarterfinals to Masamichi Imamura and Naoki Tajima.

Imamura and Tajima won the title after defeating Siddhant Banthia and Ramkumar Ramanathan 1–6, 6–3, [10–5] in the final.

== Seeds ==
1. (India) Siddhant Banthia / (India) Ramkumar Ramanathan (final)
2. (Thailand) Pruchya Isaro / (Japan) Kaichi Uchida (quarterfinals)
3. (Slovakia) Lukáš Pokorný / (China) Sun Fajing (quarterfinals, withdrew)
4. Egor Agafonov / Ilia Simakin (first round)

== Draw ==
Key

- Q = Qualifier
- WC = Wild card
- LL = Lucky loser
- Alt = Alternate
- ITF = ITF entry
- PR = Protected ranking
- SR = Special ranking
- SE = Special exempt
- JE = Junior exempt
- JR = Junior Accelerator Programme entrant
- CO = College Accelerator Programme entrant
- NG = Next Gen Accelerator Program entrant
- w/o = Walkover
- r = Retired
- d = Defaulted

=== Draw ===
First round
1	(India) S Banthia (India) R Ramanathan	7	6
(New Zealand) A Rai (Latvia) R Strombachs	5	4
(South Africa) P Henning (Zimbabwe) CJ Lock	4	6^{7}
WC	(Georgia (country)) A Bakshi; S Betov	6	7^{9}
3	(Slovakia) L Pokorný (China) F Sun	6	7^{7}
(Canada) K Stevenson (United Kingdom) H Wendelken	4	6^{1}
(Poland) S Kielan (Poland) F Pieczonka	6^{3}	4
(United Kingdom) T Hands (United Kingdom) M Whitehouse	7^{7}	6
(United Kingdom) C Broom (United Kingdom) A Gray	6	6
(Ivory Coast) E Coulibaly (South Africa) Kris van Wyk	3	4
(Japan) M Imamura (Japan) N Tajima	6	6^{6}	[10]
4	E Agafonov; I Simakin	2	7^{8}	[5]
WC	(Cyprus) E Neos (Georgia (country)) Z Tkemaladze	7^{7}	5	[4]
P Bar Biryukov (Georgia (country)) S Purtseladze	6^{5}	7	[10]
PR	(India) Sai Karteek Reddy Ganta (India) Parikshit Somani	4	2
2	(Thailand) P Isaro (Japan) K Uchida	6	6

Quarterfinals
1	(India) S Banthia (India) R Ramanathan	6	3	[10]
WC	(Georgia (country)) A Bakshi; S Betov	2	6	[6]
3	(Slovakia) L Pokorný (China) F Sun
(United Kingdom) T Hands (United Kingdom) M Whitehouse	w/o
(United Kingdom) C Broom (United Kingdom) A Gray	6^{2}	4
(Japan) M Imamura (Japan) N Tajima	7^{7}	6
P Bar Biryukov (Georgia (country)) S Purtseladze	6	6
2	(Thailand) P Isaro (Japan) K Uchida	4	2

Semifinals
1	(India) S Banthia (India) R Ramanathan	6	6
(United Kingdom) T Hands (United Kingdom) M Whitehouse	4	2
(Japan) M Imamura (Japan) N Tajima	6	7^{7}
P Bar Biryukov (Georgia (country)) S Purtseladze	1	6^{0}

Final
1	(India) S Banthia (India) R Ramanathan	6	3	[5]
(Japan) M Imamura (Japan) N Tajima	1	6	[10]
