= 2024 Kachreti Challenger – Singles =

Singles
- 2024 Kachreti Challenger

Final
- Champion: (France) Robin Bertrand
- Runner-up: (Georgia (country)) Aleksandre Bakshi
- Score: 6–1, 3–6, 7–5

Events
Singles	Doubles
Kachreti Challenger	· 2025 →

This was the first edition of the tournament.

Robin Bertrand won the title after defeating Aleksandre Bakshi 6–1, 3–6, 7–5 in the final.

== Seeds ==
1. (Australia) Philip Sekulic (semifinals)
2. (United Kingdom) Charles Broom (second round)
3. Egor Gerasimov (quarterfinals)
4. (Lithuania) Ričardas Berankis (first round)
5. (United Kingdom) Paul Jubb (semifinals)
6. (Ukraine) Vadym Ursu (second round)
7. (United Kingdom) Giles Hussey (second round)
8. (India) Ramkumar Ramanathan (quarterfinals)

== Draw ==
Key

- Q = Qualifier
- WC = Wild card
- LL = Lucky loser
- Alt = Alternate
- ITF = ITF entry
- PR = Protected ranking
- SR = Special ranking
- SE = Special exempt
- JE = Junior exempt
- JR = Junior Accelerator Programme entrant
- CO = College Accelerator Programme entrant
- NG = Next Gen Accelerator Program entrant
- w/o = Walkover
- r = Retired
- d = Defaulted

=== Finals ===
Semifinals
1	(Australia) Philip Sekulic	6^{3}	5
WC	(Georgia (country)) Aleksandre Bakshi	7^{7}	7
(France) Robin Bertrand	3	6	6
5	(United Kingdom) Paul Jubb	6	3	2

Final
WC	(Georgia (country)) Aleksandre Bakshi	1	6	5
(France) Robin Bertrand	6	3	7

=== Top half ===
First round
1	(Australia) P Sekulic	6	6
Q	(United Kingdom) H Stewart	3	4
(Latvia) R Strombachs	6	2	7
Q	(United States) A Ayeni	4	6	5
WC	(Georgia (country)) S Purtseladze	6^{4}	6^{5}
Q	(United States) U Blanch	7^{7}	7^{7}
(Israel) Y Oliel	3	5
8	(India) R Ramanathan	6	7
4	(Lithuania) R Berankis	3	5
(Australia) B Mott	6	7
Q	(Japan) Ryuki Matsuda	6^{4}	4
Q	E Karlovskiy	7^{7}	6
(Poland) Martyn Pawelski	2	4
WC	(Georgia (country)) A Bakshi	6	6
(Spain) A Barroso Campos	4	3
6	(Ukraine) Vadym Ursu	6	6

Second round
1	(Australia) P Sekulic	7^{8}	7^{8}
(Latvia) R Strombachs	6^{6}	6^{6}
Q	(United States) U Blanch	1	4
8	(India) R Ramanathan	6	6
(Australia) B Mott	6	2	7^{7}
Q	E Karlovskiy	4	6	6^{5}
WC	(Georgia (country)) A Bakshi	6	6
6	(Ukraine) V Ursu	2	4

Quarterfinals
1	(Australia) P Sekulic	7^{8}	4	7^{7}
8	(India) R Ramanathan	6^{6}	6	6^{0}
(Australia) B Mott	1	0
WC	(Georgia (country)) A Bakshi	6	6

Semifinals
1	(Australia) P Sekulic	6^{3}	5
WC	(Georgia (country)) A Bakshi	7^{7}	7

=== Bottom half ===
First round
7	(United Kingdom) G Hussey	6^{6}	7^{7}	6
Q	Nikolay Vylegzhanin	7^{8}	6^{4}	1
(France) R Bertrand	6	6
B Bobrov	2	0
(Chile) M Soto	6	6
WC	(Georgia (country)) Z Tkemaladze	1	2
(Cyprus) M Efstathiou	4	4
3	E Gerasimov	6	6
5	(United Kingdom) P Jubb	6	6
(Israel) Orel Kimhi	1	1
(Turkey) C İlkel	7^{7}	4	3
(Turkey) A Çelikbilek	6^{5}	6	6
(Turkey) Y Erel	2	6^{4}
(Estonia) D Glinka	6	7^{7}
(Dominican Republic) R Cid Subervi	3	4
2	(United Kingdom) C Broom	6	6

Second round
7	(United Kingdom) G Hussey	5	4
(France) R Bertrand	7	6
(Chile) M Soto	4	3
3	E Gerasimov	6	6
5	(United Kingdom) P Jubb	6	7
(Turkey) A Çelikbilek	4	5
(Estonia) D Glinka	6	6
2	(United Kingdom) C Broom	2	3

Quarterfinals
(France) R Bertrand	6	6
3	E Gerasimov	3	3
5	(United Kingdom) P Jubb	6	6
(Estonia) D Glinka	4	4

Semifinals
(France) R Bertrand	3	6	6
5	(United Kingdom) P Jubb	6	3	2
