= 2025 Mziuri Cup – Singles =

Singles
- 2025 Mziuri Cup

Final
- Champion: (Georgia (country)) Saba Purtseladze
- Runner-up: (Italy) Federico Cinà
- Score: 7–6^{(7–5)}, 6–4

Events
Singles	Doubles
- Mziuri Cup

Robin Bertrand was the defending champion but chose not to defend his title.

Saba Purtseladze won the title after defeating Federico Cinà 7–6^{(7–5)}, 6–4 in the final.

== Seeds ==
1. (United Kingdom) Johannus Monday (second round)
2. Ilia Simakin (second round)
3. (Ivory Coast) Eliakim Coulibaly (quarterfinals)
4. (Georgia (country)) Saba Purtseladze (champion)
5. (China) Sun Fajing (first round)
6. (Lithuania) Ričardas Berankis (first round)
7. (United Kingdom) Ryan Peniston (withdrew)
8. (Italy) Federico Cinà (final)
9. (Latvia) Robert Strombachs (second round)

== Draw ==
Key

- Q = Qualifier
- WC = Wild card
- LL = Lucky loser
- Alt = Alternate
- ITF = ITF entry
- PR = Protected ranking
- SR = Special ranking
- SE = Special exempt
- JE = Junior exempt
- JR = Junior Accelerator Programme entrant
- CO = College Accelerator Programme entrant
- NG = Next Gen Accelerator Program entrant
- w/o = Walkover
- r = Retired
- d = Defaulted

=== Finals ===
Semifinals
(United Kingdom) Charles Broom	2	7^{7}	6^{5}
8	(Italy) Federico Cinà	6	6^{5}	7^{7}
4	(Georgia (country)) Saba Purtseladze	7	6^{4}	7^{9}
Q	(United States) Martin Damm	5	7^{7}	6^{7}

Final
8	(Italy) Federico Cinà	6^{5}	4
4	(Georgia (country)) Saba Purtseladze	7^{7}	6

=== Top half ===
First round
1	(United Kingdom) J Monday	6	3	7
(South Africa) P Henning	4	6	5
Alt	(United Kingdom) A Gray	2	3
Q	(Slovakia) L Pokorný	6	6
Q	(France) C Chidekh	6	6
Alt	E Karlovskiy	1	3
(United Kingdom) C Broom	4	6	7^{7}
6	(Lithuania) R Berankis	6	4	6^{5}
3	(Ivory Coast) E Coulibaly	6	7^{8}
LL	(Thailand) M Jones	3	6^{6}
Alt	(France) F Bax	7^{7}	6
(Japan) K Uchida	6^{3}	4
(Japan) M Imamura	4	1
WC	(Moldova) I Snițari	6	6
P Bar Biryukov	4	4
8	(Italy) F Cinà	6	6

Second round
1	(United Kingdom) J Monday	6^{3}	4
Q	(Slovakia) L Pokorný	7^{7}	6
Q	(France) C Chidekh	3	6	4
(United Kingdom) C Broom	6	3	6
3	(Ivory Coast) E Coulibaly	6	6^{4}	7^{7}
Alt	(France) F Bax	2	7^{7}	6^{1}
WC	(Moldova) I Snițari	1	5
8	(Italy) F Cinà	6	7

Quarterfinals
Q	(Slovakia) L Pokorný	6	4	0
(United Kingdom) C Broom	3	6	6
3	(Ivory Coast) E Coulibaly	4	6^{4}
8	(Italy) F Cinà	6	7^{7}

Semifinals
(United Kingdom) C Broom	2	7^{7}	6^{5}
8	(Italy) F Cinà	6	6^{5}	7^{7}

=== Bottom half ===
First round
5	(China) F Sun	3	4
(Estonia) D Glinka	6	6
Q	(Italy) Fabrizio Andaloro	7^{7}	6^{2}	3
NG	(United Kingdom) H Searle	6^{4}	7^{7}	6
Q	(Uzbekistan) S Fomin	6	6^{5}	6
WC	(Georgia (country)) A Bakshi	3	7^{7}	1
Q	(United Kingdom) G Hussey	6	6^{2}	5
4	(Georgia (country)) S Purtseladze	2	7^{7}	7
9	(Latvia) R Strombachs	6	6
Alt	(Thailand) K Samrej	4	2
CO	(United Kingdom) T Samuel	7^{7}	6^{3}	3
Q	(United States) M Damm	6^{4}	7^{7}	6
WC	(Georgia (country)) Z Tkemaladze	2	1
(United Kingdom) G Loffhagen	6	6
(South Africa) Kris van Wyk	0	1
2	I Simakin	6	6

Second round
(Estonia) D Glinka	7^{7}	6
NG	(United Kingdom) H Searle	6^{4}	3
Q	(Uzbekistan) S Fomin	3	6^{4}
4	(Georgia (country)) S Purtseladze	6	7^{7}
9	(Latvia) R Strombachs	1	3
Q	(United States) M Damm	6	6
(United Kingdom) G Loffhagen	6	7
2	I Simakin	4	5

Quarterfinals
(Estonia) D Glinka	6^{5}	7	6^{10}
4	(Georgia (country)) S Purtseladze	7^{7}	5	7^{12}
Q	(United States) M Damm	w/o
(United Kingdom) G Loffhagen

Semifinals
4	(Georgia (country)) S Purtseladze	7	6^{4}	7^{9}
Q	(United States) M Damm	5	7^{7}	6^{7}
