= 2024 Kachreti Challenger =

- Date: 20–25 May
- Edition: 1st
- Location: Kachreti, Georgia

Champions

Singles
- (France) Robin Bertrand

Doubles
- (United Kingdom) Charles Broom / (United Kingdom) Ben Jones
| Kachreti Challenger | · 2025 → |

The 2024 Kachreti Challenger, known as the Ambassadori Kachreti Challenger, was a professional tennis tournament played on hardcourts. It was the first edition of the tournament which was part of the 2024 ATP Challenger Tour. It took place in Kachreti, Georgia between 20 and 25 May 2024.

== Singles main-draw entrants ==
=== Seeds ===
| Country | Player | Rank^{1} | Seed |
|---|---|---|---|
| AUS | Philip Sekulic | 257 | 1 |
| GBR | Charles Broom | 313 | 2 |
| | Egor Gerasimov | 321 | 3 |
| LTU | Ričardas Berankis | 324 | 4 |
| GBR | Paul Jubb | 332 | 5 |
| UKR | Vadym Ursu | 347 | 6 |
| GBR | Giles Hussey | 355 | 7 |
| IND | Ramkumar Ramanathan | 358 | 8 |

- ^{1} Rankings are as of 6 May 2024.

=== Other entrants ===
The following players received wildcards into the singles main draw:

- (Georgia (country)) Aleksandre Bakshi
- (Georgia (country)) Saba Purtseladze
- (Georgia (country)) Zura Tkemaladze

The following players received entry from the qualifying draw:

- (United States) Alafia Ayeni
- (United States) Ulises Blanch
- Evgeny Karlovskiy
- (Japan) Ryuki Matsuda
- (United Kingdom) Hamish Stewart
- Nikolay Vylegzhanin

== Champions ==
=== Singles ===
- (France) Robin Bertrand def. (Georgia (country)) Aleksandre Bakshi 6–1, 3–6, 7–5.

=== Doubles ===
- (United Kingdom) Charles Broom / (United Kingdom) Ben Jones def. Evgeny Karlovskiy / Evgenii Tiurnev 3–6, 6–1, [10–8].
