= 2022 ITF Men's World Tennis Tour (January–March) =

Men's World Tennis Tour

The 2022 ITF Men's World Tennis Tour is the 2021 edition of the second-tier tour for men's professional tennis. It is organised by the International Tennis Federation and is a tier below the ATP Challenger Tour. The ITF Men's World Tennis Tour includes tournaments with prize money ranging from $15,000 to $25,000.

From 1 March, following the Russian invasion of Ukraine the ITF announced that players from Belarus and Russia could still play on the tour but would not be allowed to play under the flag of Belarus or Russia.

== Key ==
M25 tournaments
M15 tournaments

== Month ==
=== January ===
Week of	Tournament	Winner	Runners-up	Semifinalists	Quarterfinalists
January 3	Monastir, Tunisia; Hard; M25; Singles and Doubles Draws	(Tunisia) Skander Mansouri; 6–4, 6–4	(Italy) Giovanni Oradini	(Tunisia) Aziz Dougaz (Italy) Riccardo Balzerani	(Russia) Vladislav Ivanov (China) Wang Xiaofei (France) Thomas Deschamps (Lithuania) Matas Vasiliauskas
January 3	Monastir, Tunisia; Hard; M25; Singles and Doubles Draws	(Serbia) Boris Butulija (Czech Republic) Petr Nouza; 6–4, 3–6, [10–7]	(Tunisia) Skander Mansouri (Tunisia) Aziz Ouakaa	(Tunisia) Aziz Dougaz (Italy) Riccardo Balzerani	(Russia) Vladislav Ivanov (China) Wang Xiaofei (France) Thomas Deschamps (Lithuania) Matas Vasiliauskas
January 3	Cairo, Egypt; Clay; M15; Singles and Doubles Draws	(Russia) Andrey Chepelev; 6–1, 6–2	(Italy) Edoardo Lavagno	(Russia) Denis Klok (Italy) Simone Roncalli	(Zimbabwe) Benjamin Lock (Kazakhstan) Grigoriy Lomakin (France) Maxence Beaugé (Romania) Bogdan Borza
January 3	Cairo, Egypt; Clay; M15; Singles and Doubles Draws	(Bulgaria) Anthony Genov (North Macedonia) Tomislav Jotovski; 6–3, 1–6, [10–7]	(Chinese Taipei) Ray Ho (Kazakhstan) Grigoriy Lomakin	(Russia) Denis Klok (Italy) Simone Roncalli	(Zimbabwe) Benjamin Lock (Kazakhstan) Grigoriy Lomakin (France) Maxence Beaugé (Romania) Bogdan Borza
January 3	Manacor, Spain; Hard; M15; Singles and Doubles Draws	(France) Ugo Blanchet; 6–3, 4–6, 7–6^{(7–2)}	(Switzerland) Antoine Bellier	(Spain) Pedro Ródenas (Denmark) Christian Sigsgaard	(Spain) Imanol López Morillo (Spain) Daniel Rincón (Belgium) Jeroen Vanneste (Germany) Leopold Zima
January 3	Manacor, Spain; Hard; M15; Singles and Doubles Draws	(Spain) Marc Othman Ktiri (Hong Kong) Coleman Wong; 6–2, 7–6^{(8–6)}	(Spain) Alberto Barroso Campos (Spain) Imanol López Morillo	(Spain) Pedro Ródenas (Denmark) Christian Sigsgaard	(Spain) Imanol López Morillo (Spain) Daniel Rincón (Belgium) Jeroen Vanneste (Germany) Leopold Zima
January 10	Manacor, Spain; Hard; M25; Singles and Doubles Draws	(Germany) Benjamin Hassan; 6–2, 2–6, 6–3	(Spain) Alberto Barroso Campos	(Germany) Johannes Härteis (Germany) Leopold Zima	(Spain) Daniel Mérida (Germany) Peter Heller (France) Enzo Wallart (Monaco) Lucas Catarina
January 10	Manacor, Spain; Hard; M25; Singles and Doubles Draws	(Spain) Alberto Barroso Campos (Spain) Imanol López Morillo; 7–6^{(7–3)}, 6–4	(Germany) Johannes Härteis (Germany) Benjamin Hassan	(Germany) Johannes Härteis (Germany) Leopold Zima	(Spain) Daniel Mérida (Germany) Peter Heller (France) Enzo Wallart (Monaco) Lucas Catarina
January 10	Monastir, Tunisia; Hard; M25; Singles and Doubles Draws	(Japan) Sho Shimabukuro; 6–1, 4–6, 6–1	(France) Clément Tabur	(Tunisia) Skander Mansouri (France) Dan Added	(Russia) Vladislav Ivanov (South Korea) Chung Yun-seong (Romania) David Ionel (France) Gleb Sakharov
January 10	Monastir, Tunisia; Hard; M25; Singles and Doubles Draws	(France) Théo Arribagé (Bulgaria) Alexander Donski; 6–2, 5–7, [10–7]	(France) Dan Added (France) Clément Tabur	(Tunisia) Skander Mansouri (France) Dan Added	(Russia) Vladislav Ivanov (South Korea) Chung Yun-seong (Romania) David Ionel (France) Gleb Sakharov
January 10	Bath, United Kingdom; Hard (indoor); M25; Singles and Doubles Draws	(United Kingdom) Daniel Cox; 6–4, 7–6^{(7–5)}	(United Kingdom) Charles Broom	(United Kingdom) Felix Gill (United Kingdom) Jan Choinski	(United Kingdom) Billy Harris (United Kingdom) Mark Whitehouse (United Kingdom) Daniel Little (United Kingdom) Alastair Gray
January 10	Bath, United Kingdom; Hard (indoor); M25; Singles and Doubles Draws	(United Kingdom) Charles Broom (United Kingdom) Alastair Gray; 6–2, 6–2	(Netherlands) Guy den Ouden (United Kingdom) Luke Johnson	(United Kingdom) Felix Gill (United Kingdom) Jan Choinski	(United Kingdom) Billy Harris (United Kingdom) Mark Whitehouse (United Kingdom) Daniel Little (United Kingdom) Alastair Gray
January 10	Cairo, Egypt; Clay; M15; Singles and Doubles Draws	(Poland) Daniel Michalski; 7–6^{(7–3)}, 6–2	(Russia) Andrey Chepelev	(Russia) Denis Klok (Italy) Edoardo Lavagno	(France) Maxence Beaugé (Hungary) Gergely Madarász (Chinese Taipei) Huang Tsung-hao (Zimbabwe) Benjamin Lock
January 10	Cairo, Egypt; Clay; M15; Singles and Doubles Draws	(Chinese Taipei) Ray Ho (Kazakhstan) Grigoriy Lomakin; 7–6^{(7–2)}, 7–6^{(7–3)}	(Zimbabwe) Benjamin Lock (Poland) Daniel Michalski	(Russia) Denis Klok (Italy) Edoardo Lavagno	(France) Maxence Beaugé (Hungary) Gergely Madarász (Chinese Taipei) Huang Tsung-hao (Zimbabwe) Benjamin Lock
January 10	Bagnoles-de-l'Orne, France; Clay (indoor); M15+H; Singles and Doubles Draws	(France) Luca Van Assche; 7–5, 6–3	(France) Corentin Denolly	(France) Matthieu Perchicot (France) Sascha Gueymard Wayenburg	(France) Hugo Pontico (France) Jurgen Briand (France) Maxence Brovillé (France) Alexis Musialek
January 10	Bagnoles-de-l'Orne, France; Clay (indoor); M15+H; Singles and Doubles Draws	(France) Corentin Denolly (France) Luca Van Assche; 6–3, 6–4	(France) Ronan Joncour (France) Mandresy Rakotomalala	(France) Matthieu Perchicot (France) Sascha Gueymard Wayenburg	(France) Hugo Pontico (France) Jurgen Briand (France) Maxence Brovillé (France) Alexis Musialek
January 10	Monastir, Tunisia; Hard; M15; Singles and Doubles Draws	(Syria) Hazem Naw; 5–7, 7–6^{(7–5)}, 7–6^{(9–7)}	(Romania) Sebastian Gima	(France) Térence Atmane (France) Valentin Vacherot	(China) Bu Yunchaokete (France) Robin Bertrand (Lithuania) Matas Vasiliauskas (China) Li Hanwen
January 10	Monastir, Tunisia; Hard; M15; Singles and Doubles Draws	(China) Li Hanwen (China) Bu Yunchaokete; 6–3, 6–2	(Russia) Kirill Mishkin (Russia) Vitali Shvets	(France) Térence Atmane (France) Valentin Vacherot	(China) Bu Yunchaokete (France) Robin Bertrand (Lithuania) Matas Vasiliauskas (China) Li Hanwen
January 10	Antalya, Turkey; Clay; M15; Singles and Doubles Draws	(Sweden) Dragoș Nicolae Mădăraș; 6–0, 6–0	(Romania) Bogdan Ionuț Apostol	(Spain) Benjamín Winter López (Spain) Jorge Martínez Martínez	(Ukraine) Oleksandr Ovcharenko (Spain) Gerard Planelles Ripoll (Italy) Davide Galoppini (Romania) Ștefan Paloși
January 10	Antalya, Turkey; Clay; M15; Singles and Doubles Draws	(Sweden) Dragoș Nicolae Mădăraș (Ukraine) Oleksandr Ovcharenko; 6–3, 6–3	(Spain) Carlos López Montagud (Spain) Benjamín Winter López	(Spain) Benjamín Winter López (Spain) Jorge Martínez Martínez	(Ukraine) Oleksandr Ovcharenko (Spain) Gerard Planelles Ripoll (Italy) Davide Galoppini (Romania) Ștefan Paloși
January 17	Vilnius, Lithuania; Hard (indoor); M25; Singles and Doubles Draws	(Kazakhstan) Denis Yevseyev; 5–7, 6–3, 7–6^{(7–4)}	(Finland) Otto Virtanen	(Brazil) Gabriel Décamps (Czech Republic) David Poljak	(Israel) Daniel Cukierman (Belarus) Ivan Liutarevich (Germany) Lucas Gerch (Germany) Henri Squire
January 17	Vilnius, Lithuania; Hard (indoor); M25; Singles and Doubles Draws	(Belarus) Ivan Liutarevich (Kazakhstan) Denis Yevseyev; 6–4, 7–6^{(7–4)}	(Hungary) Péter Fajta (Hungary) Fábián Marozsán	(Brazil) Gabriel Décamps (Czech Republic) David Poljak	(Israel) Daniel Cukierman (Belarus) Ivan Liutarevich (Germany) Lucas Gerch (Germany) Henri Squire
January 17	Monastir, Tunisia; Hard; M25; Singles and Doubles Draws	(France) Harold Mayot; 6–4, 0–6, 6–4	(South Korea) Chung Yun-seong	(France) Titouan Droguet (France) Calvin Hemery	(France) Gleb Sakharov (France) Clément Tabur (France) Laurent Lokoli (Tunisia) Moez Echargui
January 17	Monastir, Tunisia; Hard; M25; Singles and Doubles Draws	(France) Théo Arribagé (France) Titouan Droguet; 1–6, 6–4, [10–8]	(Croatia) Zvonimir Babić (Bulgaria) Alexander Donski	(France) Titouan Droguet (France) Calvin Hemery	(France) Gleb Sakharov (France) Clément Tabur (France) Laurent Lokoli (Tunisia) Moez Echargui
January 17	Cairo, Egypt; Clay; M15; Singles and Doubles Draws	(Poland) Daniel Michalski; 6–4, 6–3	(Austria) David Pichler	(Italy) Riccardo Bonadio (Hungary) Gergely Madarász	(Russia) Andrey Chepelev (Russia) Denis Klok (Italy) Edoardo Lavagno (Chinese Taipei) Hsu Yu-hsiou
January 17	Cairo, Egypt; Clay; M15; Singles and Doubles Draws	(Chinese Taipei) Hsu Yu-hsiou (Chinese Taipei) Huang Tsung-hao; 6–4, 7–6^{(8–6)}	(Italy) Riccardo Bonadio (Austria) David Pichler	(Italy) Riccardo Bonadio (Hungary) Gergely Madarász	(Russia) Andrey Chepelev (Russia) Denis Klok (Italy) Edoardo Lavagno (Chinese Taipei) Hsu Yu-hsiou
January 17	Cancún, Mexico; Hard; M15; Singles and Doubles Draws	(United States) Brandon Holt; 6–0, 6–3	(United States) Matt Kuhar	(United States) Isaiah Strode (Mexico) Alex Hernández	(United States) Emil Reinberg (Austria) Sandro Kopp (United States) Evan Zhu (United States) Ezekiel Clark
January 17	Cancún, Mexico; Hard; M15; Singles and Doubles Draws	(United States) Ezekiel Clark (United States) Evan Zhu; 7–5, 6–4	(Sweden) Filip Bergevi (Netherlands) Mick Veldheer	(United States) Isaiah Strode (Mexico) Alex Hernández	(United States) Emil Reinberg (Austria) Sandro Kopp (United States) Evan Zhu (United States) Ezekiel Clark
January 17	Kazan, Russia; Hard (indoor); M15; Singles and Doubles Draws	(Russia) Alibek Kachmazov; 6–3, 6–3	(Russia) Marat Sharipov	(Russia) Evgeny Philippov (Russia) Alexander Vasilenko	(Russia) Yan Sabanin (Bulgaria) Leonid Sheyngezikht (Belarus) Martin Borisiouk (Belarus) Aliaksandr Liaonenka
January 17	Kazan, Russia; Hard (indoor); M15; Singles and Doubles Draws	(Russia) Timur Kiyamov (Russia) Marat Sharipov; 7–5, 6–3	(Russia) Mikhail Fufygin (Russia) Maxim Ratniuk	(Russia) Evgeny Philippov (Russia) Alexander Vasilenko	(Russia) Yan Sabanin (Bulgaria) Leonid Sheyngezikht (Belarus) Martin Borisiouk (Belarus) Aliaksandr Liaonenka
January 17	Monastir, Tunisia; Hard; M15; Singles and Doubles Draws	(France) Valentin Vacherot; 6–3, 6–4	(Belgium) Raphaël Collignon	(Syria) Hazem Naw (Zimbabwe) Benjamin Lock	(Italy) Giovanni Oradini (Italy) Marco Brugnerotto (China) Bu Yunchaokete (Italy) Mattia Bellucci
January 17	Monastir, Tunisia; Hard; M15; Singles and Doubles Draws	(Japan) Naoki Tajima (Japan) Kaito Uesugi; Walkover	(Belgium) Loïc Cloes (Ukraine) Marat Deviatiarov	(Syria) Hazem Naw (Zimbabwe) Benjamin Lock	(Italy) Giovanni Oradini (Italy) Marco Brugnerotto (China) Bu Yunchaokete (Italy) Mattia Bellucci
January 17	Antalya, Turkey; Clay; M15; Singles and Doubles Draws	(Italy) Giovanni Fonio; 6–1, 6–4	(Romania) Cezar Crețu	(Israel) Ben Patael (Italy) Davide Galoppini	(Romania) Ștefan Paloși (Spain) Jorge Martínez Martínez (Germany) Paul Wörner (South Korea) Nam Ji-sung
January 17	Antalya, Turkey; Clay; M15; Singles and Doubles Draws	(South Korea) Hong Seong-chan (South Korea) Nam Ji-sung; 6–3, 6–3	(Sweden) Dragoș Nicolae Mădăraș (Ukraine) Oleksandr Ovcharenko	(Israel) Ben Patael (Italy) Davide Galoppini	(Romania) Ștefan Paloși (Spain) Jorge Martínez Martínez (Germany) Paul Wörner (South Korea) Nam Ji-sung
January 24	Cairo, Egypt; Clay; M25; Singles and Doubles Draws	(Spain) Oriol Roca Batalla; 6–2, 7–5	(Austria) Lukas Krainer	(Italy) Riccardo Bonadio (Spain) Pol Martín Tiffon	(Colombia) Juan Manuel Benítez Chavarriaga (Ukraine) Volodymyr Uzhylovskyi (Austria) Neil Oberleitner (Serbia) Miljan Zekić
January 24	Cairo, Egypt; Clay; M25; Singles and Doubles Draws	(Chinese Taipei) Hsu Yu-hsiou (Austria) Neil Oberleitner; 7–6^{(7–5)}, 6–4	(Greece) Markos Kalovelonis (Austria) David Pichler	(Italy) Riccardo Bonadio (Spain) Pol Martín Tiffon	(Colombia) Juan Manuel Benítez Chavarriaga (Ukraine) Volodymyr Uzhylovskyi (Austria) Neil Oberleitner (Serbia) Miljan Zekić
January 24	Monastir, Tunisia; Hard; M25; Singles and Doubles Draws	(Tunisia) Moez Echargui; 6–4, 7–5	(France) Laurent Lokoli	(Austria) Filip Misolic (Japan) Sho Shimabukuro	(Japan) Keisuke Saitoh (France) Valentin Royer (France) Dan Added (Serbia) Marko Topo
January 24	Monastir, Tunisia; Hard; M25; Singles and Doubles Draws	(Tunisia) Skander Mansouri (Serbia) Marko Topo; 6–4, 7–5	(France) Florent Bax (France) Robin Bertrand	(Austria) Filip Misolic (Japan) Sho Shimabukuro	(Japan) Keisuke Saitoh (France) Valentin Royer (France) Dan Added (Serbia) Marko Topo
January 24	Loughborough, United Kingdom; Hard (indoor); M25; Singles and Doubles Draws	(France) Antoine Escoffier; 6–4, 3–6, 6–3	(United Kingdom) Ryan Peniston	(United Kingdom) Aidan McHugh (United Kingdom) Jan Choinski	(United Kingdom) Billy Harris (United Kingdom) Ben Jones (United Kingdom) Paul Jubb (United Kingdom) Anton Matusevich
January 24	Loughborough, United Kingdom; Hard (indoor); M25; Singles and Doubles Draws	(United Kingdom) Julian Cash (Germany) Lucas Gerch; 6–4, 6–3	(United Kingdom) Anton Matusevich (United Kingdom) Joshua Paris	(United Kingdom) Aidan McHugh (United Kingdom) Jan Choinski	(United Kingdom) Billy Harris (United Kingdom) Ben Jones (United Kingdom) Paul Jubb (United Kingdom) Anton Matusevich
January 24	Weston, United States; Clay; M25; Singles and Doubles Draws	(Spain) Eduard Esteve Lobato; 6–3, 7–5	(Germany) Timo Stodder	(Switzerland) Leandro Riedi (United States) Noah Rubin	(Sweden) Jonathan Mridha (United Kingdom) Blu Baker (Germany) Louis Wessels (Argentina) Federico Agustín Gómez
January 24	Weston, United States; Clay; M25; Singles and Doubles Draws	(United States) Dennis Novikov (South Africa) Ruan Roelofse; 7–5, 3–6, [10–3]	(Ghana) Abraham Asaba (Burundi) Guy Orly Iradukunda	(Switzerland) Leandro Riedi (United States) Noah Rubin	(Sweden) Jonathan Mridha (United Kingdom) Blu Baker (Germany) Louis Wessels (Argentina) Federico Agustín Gómez
January 24	Cancún, Mexico; Hard; M15; Singles and Doubles Draws	(United States) Brandon Holt; 6–0, 6–3	(Mexico) Luis Patiño	(Mexico) Alex Hernández (United States) Emil Reinberg	(United States) Ezekiel Clark (Argentina) Maximiliano Estévez (The Bahamas) Justin Roberts (Colombia) Juan Sebastián Gómez
January 24	Cancún, Mexico; Hard; M15; Singles and Doubles Draws	(Sweden) Filip Bergevi (Netherlands) Mick Veldheer; 6–4, 6–4	(France) Constantin Bittoun Kouzmine (Mexico) Luis Patiño	(Mexico) Alex Hernández (United States) Emil Reinberg	(United States) Ezekiel Clark (Argentina) Maximiliano Estévez (The Bahamas) Justin Roberts (Colombia) Juan Sebastián Gómez
January 24	Monastir, Tunisia; Hard; M15; Singles and Doubles Draws	(Italy) Mattia Bellucci; 6–4, 7–5	(Italy) Francesco Passaro	(China) Li Hanwen (Serbia) Hamad Međedović	(Hungary) Péter Fajta (France) Arthur Bouquier (Italy) Omar Giacalone (Germany) Max Hans Rehberg
January 24	Monastir, Tunisia; Hard; M15; Singles and Doubles Draws	(Japan) Naoki Tajima (Japan) Kaito Uesugi; 6–2, 7–6^{(7–5)}	(France) Arthur Bouquier (France) Martin Breysach	(China) Li Hanwen (Serbia) Hamad Međedović	(Hungary) Péter Fajta (France) Arthur Bouquier (Italy) Omar Giacalone (Germany) Max Hans Rehberg
January 24	Antalya, Turkey; Clay; M15; Singles and Doubles Draws	(Sweden) Dragoș Nicolae Mădăraș; 7–6^{(7–5)}, 6–3	(France) Corentin Denolly	(Italy) Davide Galoppini (Turkey) Marsel İlhan	(Turkey) Ergi Kırkın (Italy) Giovanni Fonio (Uzbekistan) Khumoyun Sultanov (Romania) Alexandru Jecan
January 24	Antalya, Turkey; Clay; M15; Singles and Doubles Draws	Doubles competition was abandoned due to ongoing poor weather		(Italy) Davide Galoppini (Turkey) Marsel İlhan	(Turkey) Ergi Kırkın (Italy) Giovanni Fonio (Uzbekistan) Khumoyun Sultanov (Romania) Alexandru Jecan
January 31	Campos do Jordão, Brazil; Hard; M25; Singles and Doubles Draws	(Brazil) Mateus Alves; 6–1, 6–4	(Peru) Nicolás Álvarez	(Brazil) Fernando Yamacita (Brazil) Gustavo Heide	(Brazil) Gabriel Roveri Sidney (Brazil) Gabriel Pascotto Tumasonis (Brazil) Pedro Boscardin Dias (Brazil) José Pereira
January 31	Campos do Jordão, Brazil; Hard; M25; Singles and Doubles Draws	Doubles competition was abandoned due to ongoing poor weather		(Brazil) Fernando Yamacita (Brazil) Gustavo Heide	(Brazil) Gabriel Roveri Sidney (Brazil) Gabriel Pascotto Tumasonis (Brazil) Pedro Boscardin Dias (Brazil) José Pereira
January 31	Sharm El Sheikh, Egypt; Hard; M25; Singles and Doubles Draws	(Lebanon) Hady Habib; 6–4, 6–4	(Czech Republic) Lukáš Rosol	(Kazakhstan) Beibit Zhukayev (Czech Republic) Marek Gengel	(Belarus) Uladzimir Ignatik (Ukraine) Georgii Kravchenko (Russia) Alexander Shevchenko (Russia) Evgeny Karlovskiy
January 31	Sharm El Sheikh, Egypt; Hard; M25; Singles and Doubles Draws	(Russia) Alibek Kachmazov (Kazakhstan) Beibit Zhukayev; 1–6, 7–6^{(7–1)}, [10–5]	(Chinese Taipei) Hsu Yu-hsiou (Austria) Neil Oberleitner	(Kazakhstan) Beibit Zhukayev (Czech Republic) Marek Gengel	(Belarus) Uladzimir Ignatik (Ukraine) Georgii Kravchenko (Russia) Alexander Shevchenko (Russia) Evgeny Karlovskiy
January 31	Cancún, Mexico; Hard; M15; Singles and Doubles Draws	(United States) Brandon Holt; 7–5, 6–0	(United States) Emil Reinberg	(Mexico) Luis Patiño (France) Térence Atmane	(Argentina) Francisco Comesaña (France) Jaimee Floyd Angele (Mexico) Alex Hernández (United States) Gage Brymer
January 31	Cancún, Mexico; Hard; M15; Singles and Doubles Draws	(Peru) Arklon Huertas del Pino (Peru) Jorge Panta; 4–6, 6–3, [10–5]	(United States) Ryan Dickerson (Italy) Francesco Ferrari	(Mexico) Luis Patiño (France) Térence Atmane	(Argentina) Francisco Comesaña (France) Jaimee Floyd Angele (Mexico) Alex Hernández (United States) Gage Brymer
January 31	Villena, Spain; Hard; M15; Singles and Doubles Draws	(Spain) Nikolás Sánchez Izquierdo; 7–6^{(7–3)}, 6–3	(Spain) Alejandro Moro Cañas	(Germany) Johannes Härteis (Spain) John Echeverría	(France) Maxime Chazal (France) Thomas Deschamps (Denmark) Johannes Ingildsen (Brazil) Oscar José Gutierrez
January 31	Villena, Spain; Hard; M15; Singles and Doubles Draws	(Portugal) Pedro Araújo (Denmark) Johannes Ingildsen; 7–6^{(7–2)}, 7–6^{(9–7)}	(France) Maxime Chazal (Belgium) Buvaysar Gadamauri	(Germany) Johannes Härteis (Spain) John Echeverría	(France) Maxime Chazal (France) Thomas Deschamps (Denmark) Johannes Ingildsen (Brazil) Oscar José Gutierrez
January 31	Monastir, Tunisia; Hard; M15; Singles and Doubles Draws	(France) Laurent Lokoli; 6–0, 3–6, 7–5	(Bulgaria) Alexander Donski	(Monaco) Lucas Catarina (Italy) Federico Iannaccone	(Italy) Alexander Weis (France) Timo Legout (Italy) Mattia Bellucci (Northern Mariana Islands) Colin Sinclair
January 31	Monastir, Tunisia; Hard; M15; Singles and Doubles Draws	(Japan) Kaito Uesugi (Japan) Jumpei Yamasaki; 6–1, 6–1	(Netherlands) Sidané Pontjodikromo (Italy) Alexander Weis	(Monaco) Lucas Catarina (Italy) Federico Iannaccone	(Italy) Alexander Weis (France) Timo Legout (Italy) Mattia Bellucci (Northern Mariana Islands) Colin Sinclair
January 31	Antalya, Turkey; Clay; M15; Singles and Doubles Draws	(Russia) Evgenii Tiurnev; 7–6^{(9–7)}, 6–7^{(5–7)}, 7–5	(Romania) Cezar Crețu	(Serbia) Miljan Zekić (South Korea) Hong Seong-chan	(Italy) Marcello Serafini (France) Matthieu Perchicot (France) Maxime Hamou (Japan) Taiyo Yamanaka
January 31	Antalya, Turkey; Clay; M15; Singles and Doubles Draws	(South Korea) Hong Seong-chan (South Korea) Nam Ji-sung; 6–4, 6–4	(Turkey) Sarp Ağabigün (Romania) Alexandru Jecan	(Serbia) Miljan Zekić (South Korea) Hong Seong-chan	(Italy) Marcello Serafini (France) Matthieu Perchicot (France) Maxime Hamou (Japan) Taiyo Yamanaka

=== February ===
Week of	Tournament	Winner	Runners-up	Semifinalists	Quarterfinalists
February 7	Canberra, Australia; Hard; M25; Singles and Doubles Draws	(Australia) Dane Sweeny; 6–3, 4–6, 7–5	(Australia) Akira Santillan	(New Zealand) Rubin Statham (Australia) James McCabe	(Australia) Tristan Schoolkate (Australia) Aaron Addison (Australia) Matthew Romios (Australia) Omar Jasika
February 7	Canberra, Australia; Hard; M25; Singles and Doubles Draws	(Australia) Akira Santillan (New Zealand) Rubin Statham; 6–4, 6–3	(Australia) Calum Puttergill (Japan) Naoki Tajima	(New Zealand) Rubin Statham (Australia) James McCabe	(Australia) Tristan Schoolkate (Australia) Aaron Addison (Australia) Matthew Romios (Australia) Omar Jasika
February 7	Sharm El Sheikh, Egypt; Hard; M25; Singles and Doubles Draws	(Chinese Taipei) Hsu Yu-hsiou; 6–3, 6–2	(Czech Republic) Marek Gengel	(Czech Republic) Lukáš Rosol (Russia) Yan Bondarevskiy	(Uzbekistan) Sanjar Fayziev (Hungary) Fábián Marozsán (Germany) Robert Strombachs (Russia) Evgeny Karlovskiy
February 7	Sharm El Sheikh, Egypt; Hard; M25; Singles and Doubles Draws	(Czech Republic) Marek Gengel (Czech Republic) Lukáš Rosol; 6–4, 6–3	(Uzbekistan) Sanjar Fayziev (Uzbekistan) Sergey Fomin	(Czech Republic) Lukáš Rosol (Russia) Yan Bondarevskiy	(Uzbekistan) Sanjar Fayziev (Hungary) Fábián Marozsán (Germany) Robert Strombachs (Russia) Evgeny Karlovskiy
February 7	Cancún, Mexico; Hard; M25; Singles and Doubles Draws	(United States) JC Aragone; 6–1, 6–3	(Germany) Lucas Gerch	(Colombia) Alejandro González (Ecuador) Roberto Quiroz	(United States) Gage Brymer (United States) Dennis Novikov (Sweden) Filip Bergevi (United States) Donald Young
February 7	Cancún, Mexico; Hard; M25; Singles and Doubles Draws	(United States) JC Aragone (Canada) Peter Polansky; 6–2, 6–4	(Bolivia) Boris Arias (Bolivia) Federico Zeballos	(Colombia) Alejandro González (Ecuador) Roberto Quiroz	(United States) Gage Brymer (United States) Dennis Novikov (Sweden) Filip Bergevi (United States) Donald Young
February 7	Shrewsbury, United Kingdom; Hard (indoor); M25; Singles and Doubles Draws	(United Kingdom) Alastair Gray; 7–5, 6–1	(United Kingdom) Harry Wendelken	(United Kingdom) Stuart Parker (Germany) Henri Squire	(France) Antoine Escoffier (United Kingdom) Felix Gill (United Kingdom) Oliver Tarvet (United Kingdom) Jack Pinnington Jones
February 7	Shrewsbury, United Kingdom; Hard (indoor); M25; Singles and Doubles Draws	(United Kingdom) Anton Matusevich (United Kingdom) Joshua Paris; 6–4, 6–4	(United Kingdom) Oscar Weightman (United Kingdom) Harry Wendelken	(United Kingdom) Stuart Parker (Germany) Henri Squire	(France) Antoine Escoffier (United Kingdom) Felix Gill (United Kingdom) Oliver Tarvet (United Kingdom) Jack Pinnington Jones
February 7	Punta Cana, Dominican Republic; Clay; M15; Singles and Doubles Draws	(Argentina) Francisco Comesaña; 4–6, 7–5, 6–1	(Dominican Republic) Roberto Cid Subervi	(France) Jurgen Briand (United States) Alfredo Perez	(France) Quentin Folliot (Ukraine) Oleg Prihodko (Ecuador) Álvaro Guillén Meza (Hungary) Mátyás Füle
February 7	Punta Cana, Dominican Republic; Clay; M15; Singles and Doubles Draws	(Austria) David Pichler (Ukraine) Oleg Prihodko; 6–3, 6–3	(France) Jurgen Briand (France) Alexis Musialek	(France) Jurgen Briand (United States) Alfredo Perez	(France) Quentin Folliot (Ukraine) Oleg Prihodko (Ecuador) Álvaro Guillén Meza (Hungary) Mátyás Füle
February 7	Grenoble, France; Hard (indoor); M15; Singles and Doubles Draws	(Russia) Alexey Vatutin; 6–4, 6–1	(France) Sascha Gueymard Wayenburg	(Germany) Tim Handel (France) Tak Khunn Wang	(France) Émilien Voisin (Brazil) Oscar José Gutierrez (France) Baptiste Crepatte (Switzerland) Leandro Riedi
February 7	Grenoble, France; Hard (indoor); M15; Singles and Doubles Draws	(France) Arthur Bouquier (France) Martin Breysach; 6–2, 6–3	(Switzerland) Louroi Martinez (Switzerland) Leandro Riedi	(Germany) Tim Handel (France) Tak Khunn Wang	(France) Émilien Voisin (Brazil) Oscar José Gutierrez (France) Baptiste Crepatte (Switzerland) Leandro Riedi
February 7	Monastir, Tunisia; Hard; M15; Singles and Doubles Draws	(Netherlands) Guy den Ouden; 7–5, 5–7, 7–5	(Switzerland) Jakub Paul	(Ivory Coast) Eliakim Coulibaly (Serbia) Hamad Međedović	(Monaco) Lucas Catarina (Japan) Hikaru Shiraishi (Switzerland) Jérôme Kym (Czech Republic) Andrew Paulson
February 7	Monastir, Tunisia; Hard; M15; Singles and Doubles Draws	(Czech Republic) Antonín Bolardt (Czech Republic) Andrew Paulson; 6–0, 7–5	(Japan) Shinji Hazawa (Netherlands) Ryan Nijboer	(Ivory Coast) Eliakim Coulibaly (Serbia) Hamad Međedović	(Monaco) Lucas Catarina (Japan) Hikaru Shiraishi (Switzerland) Jérôme Kym (Czech Republic) Andrew Paulson
February 7	Antalya, Turkey; Clay; M15; Singles and Doubles Draws	(Austria) Lukas Neumayer; 6–2, 6–2	(Uruguay) Martín Cuevas	(Russia) Evgenii Tiurnev (Italy) Riccardo Bonadio	(Romania) Alexandru Jecan (Serbia) Miljan Zekić (Uzbekistan) Khumoyun Sultanov (France) Titouan Droguet
February 7	Antalya, Turkey; Clay; M15; Singles and Doubles Draws	(Uruguay) Martín Cuevas (Spain) Àlex Martí Pujolràs; 3–6, 6–3, [10–4]	(Morocco) Adam Moundir (Switzerland) Nicolás Parizzia	(Russia) Evgenii Tiurnev (Italy) Riccardo Bonadio	(Romania) Alexandru Jecan (Serbia) Miljan Zekić (Uzbekistan) Khumoyun Sultanov (France) Titouan Droguet
February 7	Naples, United States; Clay; M15; Singles and Doubles Draws	(Brazil) Pedro Boscardin Dias; 6–3, 7–6^{(7–5)}	(Bolivia) Murkel Dellien	(Brazil) José Pereira (United Kingdom) Blu Baker	(China) Shang Juncheng (France) Antoine Cornut-Chauvinc (Sweden) Jonathan Mridha (United States) Vasil Kirkov
February 7	Naples, United States; Clay; M15; Singles and Doubles Draws	(Brazil) Pedro Boscardin Dias (Brazil) José Pereira; 0–6, 6–2, [14–12]	(United States) Colin Markes (New Zealand) Kiranpal Pannu	(Brazil) José Pereira (United Kingdom) Blu Baker	(China) Shang Juncheng (France) Antoine Cornut-Chauvinc (Sweden) Jonathan Mridha (United States) Vasil Kirkov
February 14	Canberra, Australia; Hard; M25; Singles and Doubles Draws	(Australia) Dane Sweeny; 5–7, 7–6^{(8–6)}, 6–3	(Australia) James McCabe	(New Zealand) Rubin Statham (Australia) Aaron Addison	(Australia) Matthew Romios (Australia) Moerani Bouzige (Australia) Matthew Dellavedova (Australia) Philip Sekulic
February 14	Canberra, Australia; Hard; M25; Singles and Doubles Draws	(Australia) Dane Sweeny (Australia) Li Tu; 5–7, 7–5	(Australia) Jayden Court (Australia) David Hough	(New Zealand) Rubin Statham (Australia) Aaron Addison	(Australia) Matthew Romios (Australia) Moerani Bouzige (Australia) Matthew Dellavedova (Australia) Philip Sekulic
February 14	Cancún, Mexico; Hard; M25; Singles and Doubles Draws	(United States) Keegan Smith; 6–4, 6–1	(Germany) Lucas Gerch	(France) Jaimee Floyd Angele (United States) Nick Chappell	(France) Geoffrey Blancaneaux (Dominican Republic) Nick Hardt (Israel) Daniel Cukierman (United States) Emil Reinberg
February 14	Cancún, Mexico; Hard; M25; Singles and Doubles Draws	(France) Geoffrey Blancaneaux (Greece) Michail Pervolarakis; 6–2, 4–6, [11–9]	(Bolivia) Boris Arias (Bolivia) Federico Zeballos	(France) Jaimee Floyd Angele (United States) Nick Chappell	(France) Geoffrey Blancaneaux (Dominican Republic) Nick Hardt (Israel) Daniel Cukierman (United States) Emil Reinberg
February 14	Antalya, Turkey; Clay; M25; Singles and Doubles Draws	(Italy) Riccardo Bonadio; 6–3, 3–6, 7–5	(Uruguay) Martín Cuevas	(Poland) Daniel Michalski (Croatia) Duje Ajduković	(Romania) Ștefan Paloși (France) Titouan Droguet (Turkey) Ergi Kırkın (Serbia) Miljan Zekić
February 14	Antalya, Turkey; Clay; M25; Singles and Doubles Draws	(Romania) Alexandru Jecan (Romania) Ștefan Paloși; 6–1, 6–3	(Turkey) Tuna Altuna (Uzbekistan) Khumoyun Sultanov	(Poland) Daniel Michalski (Croatia) Duje Ajduković	(Romania) Ștefan Paloși (France) Titouan Droguet (Turkey) Ergi Kırkın (Serbia) Miljan Zekić
February 14	Glasgow, United Kingdom; Hard (indoor); M25; Singles and Doubles Draws	(United Kingdom) Alastair Gray; 6–3, 6–7^{(6–8)}, 7–6^{(7–4)}	(Germany) Henri Squire	(United Kingdom) Aidan McHugh (United Kingdom) Harry Wendelken	(United Kingdom) Billy Harris (United Kingdom) Henry Patten (United Kingdom) Anton Matusevich (United Kingdom) Stuart Parker
February 14	Glasgow, United Kingdom; Hard (indoor); M25; Singles and Doubles Draws	(Netherlands) Gijs Brouwer (United Kingdom) Aidan McHugh; 4–6, 7–6^{(7–1)}, [10–4]	(United Kingdom) Charles Broom (Germany) Constantin Frantzen	(United Kingdom) Aidan McHugh (United Kingdom) Harry Wendelken	(United Kingdom) Billy Harris (United Kingdom) Henry Patten (United Kingdom) Anton Matusevich (United Kingdom) Stuart Parker
February 14	Punta Cana, Dominican Republic; Clay; M15; Singles and Doubles Draws	(Italy) Edoardo Lavagno; 6–4, 6–3	(Hungary) Mátyás Füle	(France) Sean Cuenin (Argentina) Francisco Comesaña	(Ecuador) Álvaro Guillén Meza (Italy) Marco Brugnerotto (Austria) David Pichler (United States) Alfredo Perez
February 14	Punta Cana, Dominican Republic; Clay; M15; Singles and Doubles Draws	(Austria) David Pichler (Ukraine) Oleg Prihodko; 6–0, 6–2	(Peru) Conner Huertas del Pino (Peru) Jorge Panta	(France) Sean Cuenin (Argentina) Francisco Comesaña	(Ecuador) Álvaro Guillén Meza (Italy) Marco Brugnerotto (Austria) David Pichler (United States) Alfredo Perez
February 14	Sharm El Sheikh, Egypt; Hard; M15; Singles and Doubles Draws	(South Korea) Lee Duck-hee; 6–2, 1–6, 7–5	(Israel) Ben Patael	(Hungary) Péter Fajta (Hungary) Máté Valkusz	(Romania) David Ionel (Hong Kong) Coleman Wong (Italy) Daniele Capecchi (Chinese Taipei) Lee Kuan-yi
February 14	Sharm El Sheikh, Egypt; Hard; M15; Singles and Doubles Draws	(Romania) David Ionel (Italy) Samuel Vincent Ruggeri; 5–7, 7–6^{(7–4)}, [10–8]	(Italy) Daniele Capecchi (Italy) Luigi Sorrentino	(Hungary) Péter Fajta (Hungary) Máté Valkusz	(Romania) David Ionel (Hong Kong) Coleman Wong (Italy) Daniele Capecchi (Chinese Taipei) Lee Kuan-yi
February 14	Oberhaching, Germany; Hard (indoor); M15; Singles and Doubles Draws	(Germany) Marvin Möller; 6–3, 4–6, 7–5	(France) Sascha Gueymard Wayenburg	(Italy) Giovanni Oradini (France) Valentin Royer	(Luxembourg) Alex Knaff (France) Luca Van Assche (Austria) Sandro Kopp (Italy) Riccardo Balzerani
February 14	Oberhaching, Germany; Hard (indoor); M15; Singles and Doubles Draws	(Czech Republic) Petr Nouza (Italy) Giovanni Oradini; 3–6, 6–3, [13–11]	(Israel) Edan Leshem (Northern Mariana Islands) Colin Sinclair	(Italy) Giovanni Oradini (France) Valentin Royer	(Luxembourg) Alex Knaff (France) Luca Van Assche (Austria) Sandro Kopp (Italy) Riccardo Balzerani
February 14	Monastir, Tunisia; Hard; M15; Singles and Doubles Draws	(Spain) Alberto Barroso Campos; 6–2, 6–0	(Czech Republic) Andrew Paulson	(Netherlands) Guy den Ouden (Romania) Sebastian Gima	(Serbia) Viktor Jović (Slovenia) Matic Špec (Tunisia) Skander Mansouri (Spain) Imanol López Morillo
February 14	Monastir, Tunisia; Hard; M15; Singles and Doubles Draws	(Japan) Shinji Hazawa (Japan) Kaito Uesugi; 7–6^{(7–5)}, 6–4	(Spain) Alberto Barroso Campos (Spain) Imanol López Morillo	(Netherlands) Guy den Ouden (Romania) Sebastian Gima	(Serbia) Viktor Jović (Slovenia) Matic Špec (Tunisia) Skander Mansouri (Spain) Imanol López Morillo
February 14	Naples, United States; Clay; M15; Singles and Doubles Draws	(Sweden) Jonathan Mridha; 6–2, 7–6^{(7–4)}	(United States) Evan Zhu	(France) Corentin Denolly (South Africa) Khololwam Montsi	(New Zealand) Kiranpal Pannu (United States) Strong Kirchheimer (United States) Alexander Bernard (The Bahamas) Justin Roberts
February 14	Naples, United States; Clay; M15; Singles and Doubles Draws	(United Kingdom) Blu Baker (United States) Jesse Witten; 6–7^{(4–7)}, 6–4, [13–11]	(United States) Ezekiel Clark (United States) Evan Zhu	(France) Corentin Denolly (South Africa) Khololwam Montsi	(New Zealand) Kiranpal Pannu (United States) Strong Kirchheimer (United States) Alexander Bernard (The Bahamas) Justin Roberts
February 21	Santo Domingo, Dominican Republic; Hard; M25; Singles and Doubles Draws	(Chinese Taipei) Wu Tung-lin; 7–5, 6–3	(Dominican Republic) Nick Hardt	(Dominican Republic) Roberto Cid Subervi (United States) Alfredo Perez	(United States) Christian Langmo (Canada) Filip Peliwo (Brazil) Gilbert Klier Júnior (Australia) Rinky Hijikata
February 21	Santo Domingo, Dominican Republic; Hard; M25; Singles and Doubles Draws	(Australia) Rinky Hijikata (United Kingdom) Henry Patten; 2–6, 7–6^{(7–4)}, [10–3]	(Chinese Taipei) Hsu Yu-hsiou (Chinese Taipei) Wu Tung-lin	(Dominican Republic) Roberto Cid Subervi (United States) Alfredo Perez	(United States) Christian Langmo (Canada) Filip Peliwo (Brazil) Gilbert Klier Júnior (Australia) Rinky Hijikata
February 21	Nur-Sultan, Kazakhstan; Hard (indoor); M25; Singles and Doubles Draws	(Czech Republic) David Poljak; 6–5, ret.	(Russia) Konstantin Kravchuk	(Russia) Evgeny Karlovskiy (Kazakhstan) Denis Yevseyev	(Kazakhstan) Beibit Zhukayev (Poland) Michał Dembek (Russia) Bekhan Atlangeriev (Belarus) Ivan Liutarevich
February 21	Nur-Sultan, Kazakhstan; Hard (indoor); M25; Singles and Doubles Draws	(Belarus) Ivan Liutarevich (Ukraine) Vladyslav Manafov; 6–3, 6–7^{(1–7)}, [11–9]	(Russia) Petr Bar Biryukov (Russia) Evgeny Karlovskiy	(Russia) Evgeny Karlovskiy (Kazakhstan) Denis Yevseyev	(Kazakhstan) Beibit Zhukayev (Poland) Michał Dembek (Russia) Bekhan Atlangeriev (Belarus) Ivan Liutarevich
February 21	Vale do Lobo, Portugal; Hard; M25; Singles and Doubles Draws	(France) Laurent Lokoli; 6–2, 6–1	(Spain) Alejandro Moro Cañas	(Belgium) Christopher Heyman (Brazil) Gabriel Décamps	(Portugal) Gonçalo Oliveira (Israel) Edan Leshem (United Kingdom) Billy Harris (Spain) John Echeverría
February 21	Vale do Lobo, Portugal; Hard; M25; Singles and Doubles Draws	(Czech Republic) Dalibor Svrčina (Czech Republic) Michael Vrbenský; 3–6, 6–4, [10–7]	(Portugal) Francisco Cabral (Germany) Peter Heller	(Belgium) Christopher Heyman (Brazil) Gabriel Décamps	(Portugal) Gonçalo Oliveira (Israel) Edan Leshem (United Kingdom) Billy Harris (Spain) John Echeverría
February 21	Antalya, Turkey; Clay; M25; Singles and Doubles Draws	(Russia) Alexander Shevchenko; 6–2, 6–1	(Uruguay) Martín Cuevas	(France) Titouan Droguet (Poland) Daniel Michalski	(Canada) Steven Diez (Spain) Pol Martín Tiffon (Italy) Giovanni Fonio (Bosnia and Herzegovina) Nerman Fatić
February 21	Antalya, Turkey; Clay; M25; Singles and Doubles Draws	(Romania) Cezar Crețu (Romania) Alexandru Jecan; 4–6, 6–1, [11–9]	(Uruguay) Martín Cuevas (Spain) Àlex Martín Pujolràs	(France) Titouan Droguet (Poland) Daniel Michalski	(Canada) Steven Diez (Spain) Pol Martín Tiffon (Italy) Giovanni Fonio (Bosnia and Herzegovina) Nerman Fatić
February 21	Sharm El Sheikh, Egypt; Hard; M15; Singles and Doubles Draws	(Romania) David Ionel; 6–3, 4–6, 6–1	(Italy) Matteo Gigante	(South Korea) Lee Duck-hee (Colombia) Juan Manuel Benítez Chavarriaga	(Italy) Samuel Vincent Ruggeri (South Korea) Son Ji-hoon (Italy) Federico Iannaccone (Italy) Daniele Capecchi
February 21	Sharm El Sheikh, Egypt; Hard; M15; Singles and Doubles Draws	(Italy) Mattia Bellucci (Italy) Federico Iannaccone; 6–2, 6–2	(Italy) Matteo Gigante (Italy) Marco Miceli	(South Korea) Lee Duck-hee (Colombia) Juan Manuel Benítez Chavarriaga	(Italy) Samuel Vincent Ruggeri (South Korea) Son Ji-hoon (Italy) Federico Iannaccone (Italy) Daniele Capecchi
February 21	Monastir, Tunisia; Hard; M15; Singles and Doubles Draws	(Italy) Francesco Passaro; 7–6^{(7–3)}, 6–2	(France) Térence Atmane	(France) Maxence Beaugé (Ukraine) Oleksandr Ovcharenko	(Austria) Lukas Neumayer (Japan) Masamichi Imamura (Italy) Mauro de Maio (France) Alexandre Aubriot
February 21	Monastir, Tunisia; Hard; M15; Singles and Doubles Draws	(Belgium) Olivier Rojas (France) Mathieu Scaglia; 7–6^{(7–4)}, 6–0	(France) Martin Breysach (France) Timo Legout	(France) Maxence Beaugé (Ukraine) Oleksandr Ovcharenko	(Austria) Lukas Neumayer (Japan) Masamichi Imamura (Italy) Mauro de Maio (France) Alexandre Aubriot
February 21	Naples, United States; Clay; M15; Singles and Doubles Draws	(China) Shang Juncheng; 7–6^{(7–4)}, 7–6^{(7–1)}	(United States) Felix Corwin	(Germany) Timo Stodder (Brazil) Pedro Boscardin Dias	(Barbados) Darian King (Sweden) Jonathan Mridha (United States) Ryan Harrison (United States) Fletcher Scott
February 21	Naples, United States; Clay; M15; Singles and Doubles Draws	(United States) Ezekiel Clark (United States) Evan Zhu; 3–6, 6–3, [10–8]	(United Kingdom) Blu Baker (United States) Jesse Witten	(Germany) Timo Stodder (Brazil) Pedro Boscardin Dias	(Barbados) Darian King (Sweden) Jonathan Mridha (United States) Ryan Harrison (United States) Fletcher Scott
February 28	Bendigo, Australia; Hard; M25; Singles and Doubles Draws	(Australia) Li Tu; 6–3, 6–1	(Australia) Andrew Harris	(Australia) Thomas Fancutt (Australia) Philip Sekulic	(Australia) Tristan Schoolkate (Australia) Omar Jasika (Japan) Ryota Tanuma (Japan) Yusuke Takahashi
February 28	Bendigo, Australia; Hard; M25; Singles and Doubles Draws	(Australia) Calum Puttergill (Australia) Brandon Walkin; 6–2, 6–3	(Australia) Blake Ellis (Australia) Tristan Schoolkate	(Australia) Thomas Fancutt (Australia) Philip Sekulic	(Australia) Tristan Schoolkate (Australia) Omar Jasika (Japan) Ryota Tanuma (Japan) Yusuke Takahashi
February 28	Santo Domingo, Dominican Republic; Hard; M25; Singles and Doubles Draws	(France) Geoffrey Blancaneaux; 3–6, 6–2, 6–2	(Australia) Rinky Hijikata	(United States) Govind Nanda (United States) Brandon Holt	(Brazil) Gilbert Klier Júnior (United States) Oliver Crawford (United States) Aleksandar Kovacevic (United States) Keegan Smith
February 28	Santo Domingo, Dominican Republic; Hard; M25; Singles and Doubles Draws	(United Kingdom) Henry Patten (United Kingdom) Mark Whitehouse; 6–4, 6–4	(United States) Colin Markes (United States) Keegan Smith	(United States) Govind Nanda (United States) Brandon Holt	(Brazil) Gilbert Klier Júnior (United States) Oliver Crawford (United States) Aleksandar Kovacevic (United States) Keegan Smith
February 28	Trento, Italy; Hard (indoor); M25; Singles and Doubles Draws	(Germany) Marvin Möller; 6–3, 6–4	(Czech Republic) Petr Nouza	(Germany) Henri Squire (Czech Republic) Andrew Paulson	(France) Dan Added (France) Sascha Gueymard Wayenburg (Germany) Tim Handel (Italy) Federico Iannaccone
February 28	Trento, Italy; Hard (indoor); M25; Singles and Doubles Draws	(France) Dan Added (Czech Republic) Andrew Paulson; 6–4, 3–6, [10–8]	(Germany) Tim Handel (Switzerland) Yannik Steinegger	(Germany) Henri Squire (Czech Republic) Andrew Paulson	(France) Dan Added (France) Sascha Gueymard Wayenburg (Germany) Tim Handel (Italy) Federico Iannaccone
February 28	Nur-Sultan, Kazakhstan; Hard (indoor); M25; Singles and Doubles Draws	Alibek Kachmazov; 6–3, 6–7^{(5–7)}, 7–6^{(7–4)}	(Kazakhstan) Beibit Zhukayev	Aliaksandr Bulitski (Serbia) Hamad Međedović	Mikalai Haliak (Czech Republic) David Poljak; Marat Sharipov; Kirill Kivattsev
February 28	Nur-Sultan, Kazakhstan; Hard (indoor); M25; Singles and Doubles Draws	Ivan Liutarevich (Ukraine) Vladyslav Manafov; 6–4, 6–0	(Kazakhstan) Timur Khabibulin (Kazakhstan) Beibit Zhukayev	Aliaksandr Bulitski (Serbia) Hamad Međedović	Mikalai Haliak (Czech Republic) David Poljak; Marat Sharipov; Kirill Kivattsev
February 28	Faro, Portugal; Hard; M25; Singles and Doubles Draws	(France) Clément Tabur; 6–4, 6–2	(Czech Republic) Dalibor Svrčina	(France) Laurent Lokoli (Portugal) Pedro Araújo	(Spain) Sergi Pérez Contri (Japan) Jumpei Yamasaki (Spain) Alberto Barroso Campos (Portugal) Fábio Coelho
February 28	Faro, Portugal; Hard; M25; Singles and Doubles Draws	(Austria) Maximilian Neuchrist (Germany) Kai Wehnelt; 6–4, 6–4	(Japan) Makoto Ochi (Japan) Yuta Shimizu	(France) Laurent Lokoli (Portugal) Pedro Araújo	(Spain) Sergi Pérez Contri (Japan) Jumpei Yamasaki (Spain) Alberto Barroso Campos (Portugal) Fábio Coelho
February 28	Sharm El Sheikh, Egypt; Hard; M15; Singles and Doubles Draws	(Italy) Matteo Gigante; 6–2, 6–2	(Italy) Samuel Vincent Ruggeri	(Israel) Ben Patael (France) César Bourgois	(South Korea) Lee Duck-hee (Italy) Francesco Vilardo (Czech Republic) Jiří Barnat (Georgia (country)) Saba Purtseladze
February 28	Sharm El Sheikh, Egypt; Hard; M15; Singles and Doubles Draws	(Italy) Francesco Vilardo (Italy) Samuel Vincent Ruggeri; 2–6, 7–5, [10–3]	(Philippines) Francis Alcantara (Canada) Kelsey Stevenson	(Israel) Ben Patael (France) César Bourgois	(South Korea) Lee Duck-hee (Italy) Francesco Vilardo (Czech Republic) Jiří Barnat (Georgia (country)) Saba Purtseladze
February 28	Torelló, Spain; Hard; M15; Singles and Doubles Draws	(Spain) Imanol López Morillo; 6–4, 6–4	(United Kingdom) Daniel Cox	(Switzerland) Noah López (Switzerland) Leandro Riedi	(Poland) Yann Wójcik (Spain) David Jordà Sanchis (France) Enzo Wallart (Argentina) Franco Emanuel Egea
February 28	Torelló, Spain; Hard; M15; Singles and Doubles Draws	(France) Théo Arribagé (France) Luca Sanchez; 7–5, 5–7, [10–8]	(United Kingdom) Scott Duncan (Czech Republic) Dominik Kellovský	(Switzerland) Noah López (Switzerland) Leandro Riedi	(Poland) Yann Wójcik (Spain) David Jordà Sanchis (France) Enzo Wallart (Argentina) Franco Emanuel Egea
February 28	Monastir, Tunisia; Hard; M15; Singles and Doubles Draws	(Belgium) Raphaël Collignon; 7–6^{(7–2)}, 7–6^{(12–10)}	(France) Mathys Erhard	(Japan) Hikaru Shiraishi (France) Mathieu Scaglia	(Japan) Masamichi Imamura (Germany) Dominik Böhler (Italy) Omar Giacalone (Ukraine) Oleksandr Ovcharenko
February 28	Monastir, Tunisia; Hard; M15; Singles and Doubles Draws	(North Macedonia) Gorazd Srbljak (Germany) Paul Wörner; 1–6, 7–6^{(7–2)}, [10–8]	(China) Li Hanwen (China) Mu Tao	(Japan) Hikaru Shiraishi (France) Mathieu Scaglia	(Japan) Masamichi Imamura (Germany) Dominik Böhler (Italy) Omar Giacalone (Ukraine) Oleksandr Ovcharenko
February 28	Antalya, Turkey; Clay; M15; Singles and Doubles Draws	(Austria) Lukas Neumayer; 6–4, 1–6, 6–2	(Argentina) Román Andrés Burruchaga	(Japan) Taiyo Yamanaka; Andrey Chepelev	(Spain) Àlex Martí Pujolràs (United Kingdom) Felix Gill (Italy) Manuel Mazza (Romania) Cezar Crețu
February 28	Antalya, Turkey; Clay; M15; Singles and Doubles Draws	(Argentina) Román Andrés Burruchaga (United Kingdom) Felix Gill; 6–4, 6–3	(Turkey) Sarp Ağabigün (Croatia) Admir Kalender	(Japan) Taiyo Yamanaka; Andrey Chepelev	(Spain) Àlex Martí Pujolràs (United Kingdom) Felix Gill (Italy) Manuel Mazza (Romania) Cezar Crețu

=== March ===
Week of	Tournament	Winner	Runners-up	Semifinalists	Quarterfinalists
March 7	Bendigo, Australia; Hard; M25; Singles and Doubles Draws	(Australia) Omar Jasika; 6–1, 6–2	(Australia) James McCabe	(Australia) Tristan Schoolkate (Australia) Dane Sweeny	(Australia) Jason Kubler (Australia) Aaron Addison (Australia) Mitchell Harper (Australia) Akira Santillan
March 7	Bendigo, Australia; Hard; M25; Singles and Doubles Draws	(Australia) Akira Santillan (Australia) Philip Sekulic; 7–5, 6–7^{(7–9)}, [10–7]	(Australia) Dane Sweeny (Australia) Li Tu	(Australia) Tristan Schoolkate (Australia) Dane Sweeny	(Australia) Jason Kubler (Australia) Aaron Addison (Australia) Mitchell Harper (Australia) Akira Santillan
March 7	Poreč, Croatia; Clay; M25; Singles and Doubles Draws	(Austria) Filip Misolic; 3–6, 7–6^{(7–4)}, 6–2	(Spain) Oriol Roca Batalla	(Romania) Sebastian Gima (Sweden) Dragoș Nicolae Mădăraș	(Bulgaria) Alexandar Lazarov (France) Matthieu Perchicot (Croatia) Dino Prižmić (France) Titouan Droguet
March 7	Poreč, Croatia; Clay; M25; Singles and Doubles Draws	(Greece) Aristotelis Thanos (Greece) Petros Tsitsipas; 7–6^{(7–4)}, 4–6, [10–7]	(France) Titouan Droguet (Turkey) Ergi Kırkın	(Romania) Sebastian Gima (Sweden) Dragoș Nicolae Mădăraș	(Bulgaria) Alexandar Lazarov (France) Matthieu Perchicot (Croatia) Dino Prižmić (France) Titouan Droguet
March 7	Portimão, Portugal; Hard; M25; Singles and Doubles Draws	(Romania) Marius Copil; 7–5, 6–2	Alexey Vatutin	(Netherlands) Gijs Brouwer (Czech Republic) Jonáš Forejtek	(Brazil) Gabriel Décamps (Chinese Taipei) Hsu Yu-hsiou (United Kingdom) Anton Matusevich (France) Laurent Lokoli
March 7	Portimão, Portugal; Hard; M25; Singles and Doubles Draws	(Chinese Taipei) Hsu Yu-hsiou (Austria) Neil Oberleitner; 6–3, 3–6, [10–7]	(Austria) Maximilian Neuchrist (Germany) Kai Wehnelt	(Netherlands) Gijs Brouwer (Czech Republic) Jonáš Forejtek	(Brazil) Gabriel Décamps (Chinese Taipei) Hsu Yu-hsiou (United Kingdom) Anton Matusevich (France) Laurent Lokoli
March 7	Antalya, Turkey; Clay; M25; Singles and Doubles Draws	(Bosnia and Herzegovina) Nerman Fatić; 7–6^{(7–4)}, 6–4	(Ukraine) Oleksii Krutykh	(United Kingdom) Felix Gill (Japan) Yuki Mochizuki	(Austria) Lukas Neumayer (Italy) Alexander Weis (Germany) Rudolf Molleker; Alexander Shevchenko
March 7	Antalya, Turkey; Clay; M25; Singles and Doubles Draws	(Turkey) Sarp Ağabigün (Ukraine) Oleksii Krutykh; 6–4, 7–6^{(7–3)}	(Argentina) Román Andrés Burruchaga (Italy) Alexander Weis	(United Kingdom) Felix Gill (Japan) Yuki Mochizuki	(Austria) Lukas Neumayer (Italy) Alexander Weis (Germany) Rudolf Molleker; Alexander Shevchenko
March 7	Sharm El Sheikh, Egypt; Hard; M15; Singles and Doubles Draws	(Georgia (country)) Saba Purtseladze; 6–4, 6–4	(South Korea) Park Ui-sung	(Italy) Francesco Vilardo (Italy) Giovanni Oradini	(South Korea) Lee Duck-hee (Georgia (country)) Aleksandre Metreveli (Italy) Samuel Vincent Ruggeri (Greece) Michail Pervolarakis
March 7	Sharm El Sheikh, Egypt; Hard; M15; Singles and Doubles Draws	(Czech Republic) Jiří Barnat (Czech Republic) Filip Duda; 6–3, 6–2	(Uzbekistan) Sergey Fomin (South Korea) Park Ui-sung	(Italy) Francesco Vilardo (Italy) Giovanni Oradini	(South Korea) Lee Duck-hee (Georgia (country)) Aleksandre Metreveli (Italy) Samuel Vincent Ruggeri (Greece) Michail Pervolarakis
March 7	Créteil, France; Hard (indoor); M15; Singles and Doubles Draws	(France) Clément Tabur; 7–5, 6–1	(France) Axel Garcian	(France) Sean Cuenin (France) Martin Breysach	(Vietnam) Lý Hoàng Nam (Czech Republic) Andrew Paulson (France) Arthur Reymond (France) Arthur Bouquier
March 7	Créteil, France; Hard (indoor); M15; Singles and Doubles Draws	(France) Arthur Bouquier (France) Martin Breysach; 6–1, 3–6, [13–11]	(France) Théo Arribagé (France) Luca Sanchez	(France) Sean Cuenin (France) Martin Breysach	(Vietnam) Lý Hoàng Nam (Czech Republic) Andrew Paulson (France) Arthur Reymond (France) Arthur Bouquier
March 7	Bhopal, India; Hard; M15; Singles and Doubles Draws	(India) Arjun Kadhe; 7–6^{(7–2)}, 6–4	(India) Sidharth Rawat	(France) Nicolas Tepmahc (India) Manish Sureshkumar	(India) Ishaque Eqbal (India) Faisal Qamar (Germany) Robert Strombachs (United Kingdom) Julian Cash
March 7	Bhopal, India; Hard; M15; Singles and Doubles Draws	(India) Yuki Bhambri (India) Saketh Myneni; 6–4, 6–1	(India) Lohithaksha Bathrinath (India) Abhinav Sanjeev Shanmugam	(France) Nicolas Tepmahc (India) Manish Sureshkumar	(India) Ishaque Eqbal (India) Faisal Qamar (Germany) Robert Strombachs (United Kingdom) Julian Cash
March 7	Monastir, Tunisia; Hard; M15; Singles and Doubles Draws	(Monaco) Lucas Catarina; 6–4, 6–1	(France) Térence Atmane	(Ivory Coast) Eliakim Coulibaly (Belgium) Raphaël Collignon	(Italy) Andrea Basso (United States) Omni Kumar (Germany) Dominik Böhler (Germany) Max Hans Rehberg
March 7	Monastir, Tunisia; Hard; M15; Singles and Doubles Draws	(France) Robin Bertrand (Netherlands) Jarno Jans; 6–4, 1–6, [10–6]	(Ivory Coast) Eliakim Coulibaly (Turkey) Yankı Erel	(Ivory Coast) Eliakim Coulibaly (Belgium) Raphaël Collignon	(Italy) Andrea Basso (United States) Omni Kumar (Germany) Dominik Böhler (Germany) Max Hans Rehberg
March 14	Anapoima, Colombia; Clay; M25; Singles and Doubles Draws	(Argentina) Alejo Lorenzo Lingua Lavallén; 6–3, 6–0	(Ukraine) Oleg Prihodko	(Colombia) Nicolás Mejía (United States) Evan Zhu	(Colombia) Alejandro González (Colombia) Juan Manuel Benítez Chavarriaga (Peru) Conner Huertas del Pino (New Zealand) Rubin Statham
March 14	Anapoima, Colombia; Clay; M25; Singles and Doubles Draws	(Peru) Arklon Huertas del Pino (Peru) Conner Huertas del Pino; 6–3, 6–3	(Argentina) Valerio Aboian (Brazil) Pedro Boscardin Dias	(Colombia) Nicolás Mejía (United States) Evan Zhu	(Colombia) Alejandro González (Colombia) Juan Manuel Benítez Chavarriaga (Peru) Conner Huertas del Pino (New Zealand) Rubin Statham
March 14	Rovinj, Croatia; Clay; M25; Singles and Doubles Draws	(Spain) Javier Barranco Cosano; 6–1, 6–1	(Czech Republic) Dalibor Svrčina	(Romania) Cezar Crețu (Turkey) Ergi Kırkın	(Austria) Filip Misolic (Spain) Eduard Esteve Lobato (Spain) Oriol Roca Batalla (France) Arthur Cazaux
March 14	Rovinj, Croatia; Clay; M25; Singles and Doubles Draws	(Austria) David Pichler (Czech Republic) Dalibor Svrčina; 4–6, 6–2, [10–7]	(Italy) Giovanni Fonio (Bulgaria) Alexandar Lazarov	(Romania) Cezar Crețu (Turkey) Ergi Kırkın	(Austria) Filip Misolic (Spain) Eduard Esteve Lobato (Spain) Oriol Roca Batalla (France) Arthur Cazaux
March 14	Loulé, Portugal; Hard; M25; Singles and Doubles Draws	(Hungary) Fábián Marozsán; 6–7^{(6–8)}, 6–1, 6–3	(Austria) Lucas Miedler	(Japan) Kaichi Uchida (Spain) Alejandro Moro Cañas	(Portugal) Pedro Araújo (Belgium) Gauthier Onclin (Spain) Benjamín Winter López (United Kingdom) Anton Matusevich
March 14	Loulé, Portugal; Hard; M25; Singles and Doubles Draws	(Chinese Taipei) Hsu Yu-hsiou (Austria) Neil Oberleitner; 7–5, 7–5	(Portugal) Pedro Araújo (Netherlands) Guy den Ouden	(Japan) Kaichi Uchida (Spain) Alejandro Moro Cañas	(Portugal) Pedro Araújo (Belgium) Gauthier Onclin (Spain) Benjamín Winter López (United Kingdom) Anton Matusevich
March 14	Trimbach, Switzerland; Carpet (indoor); M25; Singles and Doubles Draws	(Switzerland) Leandro Riedi; 6–2, 6–2	(United Kingdom) Alastair Gray	(Germany) Daniel Masur (Germany) Johannes Härteis	(Czech Republic) Andrew Paulson (France) Dan Added (Switzerland) Kilian Feldbausch (Finland) Otto Virtanen
March 14	Trimbach, Switzerland; Carpet (indoor); M25; Singles and Doubles Draws	(Czech Republic) Petr Nouza (Czech Republic) Andrew Paulson; 6–4, 6–4	(Germany) Daniel Masur (Switzerland) Yannik Steinegger	(Germany) Daniel Masur (Germany) Johannes Härteis	(Czech Republic) Andrew Paulson (France) Dan Added (Switzerland) Kilian Feldbausch (Finland) Otto Virtanen
March 14	Antalya, Turkey; Clay; M25; Singles and Doubles Draws	(Ukraine) Oleksii Krutykh; 6–4, 4–6, 6–2	(United Kingdom) Billy Harris	(Tunisia) Moez Echargui (Ukraine) Viacheslav Bielinskyi	(Italy) Alexander Weis; Alexander Shevchenko (Japan) Yuki Mochizuki (Bosnia and Herzegovina) Nerman Fatić
March 14	Antalya, Turkey; Clay; M25; Singles and Doubles Draws	(Uzbekistan) Sanjar Fayziev (Greece) Markos Kalovelonis; 6–2, 6–4	(Tunisia) Moez Echargui (Italy) Alexander Weis	(Tunisia) Moez Echargui (Ukraine) Viacheslav Bielinskyi	(Italy) Alexander Weis; Alexander Shevchenko (Japan) Yuki Mochizuki (Bosnia and Herzegovina) Nerman Fatić
March 14	Bakersfield, United States; Hard; M25; Singles and Doubles Draws	(Australia) Rinky Hijikata; 6–1, 7–5	(United States) Keegan Smith	(Bulgaria) Adrian Andreev (United States) Ethan Quinn	(India) Prajnesh Gunneswaran (United States) Martin Damm (United States) Alex Michelsen (Germany) Julian Lenz
March 14	Bakersfield, United States; Hard; M25; Singles and Doubles Draws	(South Korea) Nam Ji-sung (South Korea) Song Min-kyu; 6–2, 6–0	(Israel) Daniel Cukierman (South Africa) Ruan Roelofse	(Bulgaria) Adrian Andreev (United States) Ethan Quinn	(India) Prajnesh Gunneswaran (United States) Martin Damm (United States) Alex Michelsen (Germany) Julian Lenz
March 14	Sharm El Sheikh, Egypt; Hard; M15; Singles and Doubles Draws	(Italy) Samuel Vincent Ruggeri; 7–5, 6–1	(Italy) Giovanni Oradini	(Uzbekistan) Sergey Fomin (Italy) Francesco Vilardo	(Greece) Michail Pervolarakis; Savriyan Danilov (Argentina) Federico Agustín Gómez; Kirill Kivattsev
March 14	Sharm El Sheikh, Egypt; Hard; M15; Singles and Doubles Draws	(Italy) Francesco Vilardo (Italy) Samuel Vincent Ruggeri; 4–6, 6–3, [10–8]	(Sweden) Filip Bergevi (Sweden) Simon Freund	(Uzbekistan) Sergey Fomin (Italy) Francesco Vilardo	(Greece) Michail Pervolarakis; Savriyan Danilov (Argentina) Federico Agustín Gómez; Kirill Kivattsev
March 14	Poitiers, France; Hard (indoor); M15; Singles and Doubles Draws	(Italy) Mattia Bellucci; 6–3, 6–7^{(6–8)}, 7–6^{(7–5)}	(France) Pierre Delage	(Vietnam) Lý Hoàng Nam (France) Kenny de Schepper	(France) Maxence Brovillé (France) Sascha Gueymard Wayenburg (United Kingdom) Daniel Little (France) Thomas Deschamps
March 14	Poitiers, France; Hard (indoor); M15; Singles and Doubles Draws	(France) Arthur Bouquier (France) Martin Breysach; 6–4, 6–4	(United Kingdom) Ben Jones (United Kingdom) Daniel Little	(Vietnam) Lý Hoàng Nam (France) Kenny de Schepper	(France) Maxence Brovillé (France) Sascha Gueymard Wayenburg (United Kingdom) Daniel Little (France) Thomas Deschamps
March 14	Bengaluru, India; Hard; M15; Singles and Doubles Draws	(India) Arjun Kadhe; 6–3, 3–6, 6–1	(India) Sidharth Rawat	(Poland) Maks Kaśnikowski (India) Manish Sureshkumar	(India) Mukund Sasikumar (India) Digvijay Pratap Singh (United Kingdom) Julian Cash (India) Niki Kaliyanda Poonacha
March 14	Bengaluru, India; Hard; M15; Singles and Doubles Draws	(United Kingdom) Julian Cash (India) Arjun Kadhe; 7–6^{(7–5)}, 3–6, [10–7]	(India) Mukund Sasikumar (India) Vishnu Vardhan	(Poland) Maks Kaśnikowski (India) Manish Sureshkumar	(India) Mukund Sasikumar (India) Digvijay Pratap Singh (United Kingdom) Julian Cash (India) Niki Kaliyanda Poonacha
March 14	Marrakesh, Morocco; Clay; M15; Singles and Doubles Draws	(Romania) David Ionel; 6–3, 6–2	(France) Alexis Musialek	(France) Titouan Droguet (Ecuador) Antonio Cayetano March	(France) Maxime Hamou (Argentina) Lorenzo Joaquín Rodríguez (Italy) Edoardo Lavagno (Morocco) Elliot Benchetrit
March 14	Marrakesh, Morocco; Clay; M15; Singles and Doubles Draws	(Argentina) Fermín Tenti (Netherlands) Mick Veldheer; 7–6^{(7–4)}, 6–1	(Italy) Stefano Battaglino (Italy) Edoardo Lavagno	(France) Titouan Droguet (Ecuador) Antonio Cayetano March	(France) Maxime Hamou (Argentina) Lorenzo Joaquín Rodríguez (Italy) Edoardo Lavagno (Morocco) Elliot Benchetrit
March 14	Palma Nova, Spain; Clay; M15; Singles and Doubles Draws	(Spain) Carlos López Montagud; 6–1, 7–5	(Brazil) Oscar José Gutierrez	(Spain) Carlos Sánchez Jover (Spain) Diego Augusto Barreto Sánchez	(Switzerland) Mirko Martinez (Romania) Ștefan Paloși (Italy) Luigi Sorrentino (Spain) Miguel Damas
March 14	Palma Nova, Spain; Clay; M15; Singles and Doubles Draws	(Romania) Ștefan Paloși (Italy) Andrea Picchione; 7–5, 6–3	(Switzerland) Louroi Martinez (Switzerland) Nicolás Parizzia	(Spain) Carlos Sánchez Jover (Spain) Diego Augusto Barreto Sánchez	(Switzerland) Mirko Martinez (Romania) Ștefan Paloși (Italy) Luigi Sorrentino (Spain) Miguel Damas
March 14	Monastir, Tunisia; Hard; M15; Singles and Doubles Draws	(Tunisia) Skander Mansouri; 7–5, 4–6, 6–0	(Belgium) Arnaud Bovy	(China) Li Hanwen (Turkey) Yankı Erel	(France) Térence Atmane (France) Valentin Vacherot (South Africa) Khololwam Montsi (Estonia) Mark Lajal
March 14	Monastir, Tunisia; Hard; M15; Singles and Doubles Draws	(China) Li Hanwen (Argentina) Mateo Nicolás Martínez; 6–1, 2–6, [10–8]	(Tunisia) Aziz Dougaz (Luxembourg) Alex Knaff	(China) Li Hanwen (Turkey) Yankı Erel	(France) Térence Atmane (France) Valentin Vacherot (South Africa) Khololwam Montsi (Estonia) Mark Lajal
March 21	Canberra, Australia; Clay; M25; Singles and Doubles Draws	(Australia) Jason Kubler; 7–6^{(7–3)}, 6–1	(Australia) Tristan Schoolkate	(Australia) Andrew Harris (Australia) James McCabe	(Australia) Li Tu (Ukraine) Eric Vanshelboim (Australia) Dayne Kelly (Australia) Dane Sweeny
March 21	Canberra, Australia; Clay; M25; Singles and Doubles Draws	(Australia) Dane Sweeny (Australia) Li Tu; 7–6^{(7–5)}, 3–6, [10–7]	(Australia) Matthew Romios (Ukraine) Eric Vanshelboim	(Australia) Andrew Harris (Australia) James McCabe	(Australia) Li Tu (Ukraine) Eric Vanshelboim (Australia) Dayne Kelly (Australia) Dane Sweeny
March 21	Medellín, Colombia; Clay; M25; Singles and Doubles Draws	(Zimbabwe) Benjamin Lock; 7–6^{(7–3)}, 4–6, 7–6^{(7–5)}	(United States) Oliver Crawford	(United States) Evan Zhu (United States) Kyle Seelig	(United States) Felix Corwin (Brazil) Mateus Alves (Colombia) Alejandro González (Argentina) Alejo Lorenzo Lingua Lavallén
March 21	Medellín, Colombia; Clay; M25; Singles and Doubles Draws	(Zimbabwe) Benjamin Lock (Zimbabwe) Courtney John Lock; 4–6, 6–4, [10–6]	(Australia) Akira Santillan (New Zealand) Rubin Statham	(United States) Evan Zhu (United States) Kyle Seelig	(United States) Felix Corwin (Brazil) Mateus Alves (Colombia) Alejandro González (Argentina) Alejo Lorenzo Lingua Lavallén
March 21	Opatija, Croatia; Clay; M25; Singles and Doubles Draws	(Hungary) Máté Valkusz; 4–6, 6–4, 6–2	(Italy) Riccardo Bonadio	(France) Kyrian Jacquet (Czech Republic) Michael Vrbenský	(Italy) Francesco Passaro (Poland) Paweł Ciaś (Spain) Oriol Roca Batalla (Croatia) Domagoj Bilješko
March 21	Opatija, Croatia; Clay; M25; Singles and Doubles Draws	(Croatia) Zvonimir Babić (Greece) Petros Tsitsipas; 6–3, 4–6, [10–8]	(Italy) Riccardo Bonadio (Czech Republic) Michael Vrbenský	(France) Kyrian Jacquet (Czech Republic) Michael Vrbenský	(Italy) Francesco Passaro (Poland) Paweł Ciaś (Spain) Oriol Roca Batalla (Croatia) Domagoj Bilješko
March 21	Toulouse-Balma, France; Hard (indoor); M25; Singles and Doubles Draws	(France) Kenny de Schepper; 6–3, 6–3	(Vietnam) Lý Hoàng Nam	(France) Harold Mayot (France) Jules Marie	(France) Maxence Brovillé (France) Ugo Blanchet (France) Arthur Bouquier (United States) Roy Smith
March 21	Toulouse-Balma, France; Hard (indoor); M25; Singles and Doubles Draws	(United Kingdom) Ben Jones (United Kingdom) Daniel Little; 7–5, 6–4	(France) Théo Arribagé (France) Luca Sanchez	(France) Harold Mayot (France) Jules Marie	(France) Maxence Brovillé (France) Ugo Blanchet (France) Arthur Bouquier (United States) Roy Smith
March 21	Quinta do Lago, Portugal; Hard; M25; Singles and Doubles Draws	(France) Valentin Vacherot; 6–4, 6–3	(Chinese Taipei) Hsu Yu-hsiou	(Netherlands) Alec Deckers (Lebanon) Hady Habib	(Japan) Makoto Ochi (United Kingdom) Anton Matusevich (Portugal) Pedro Araújo (Spain) Alejandro Moro Cañas
March 21	Quinta do Lago, Portugal; Hard; M25; Singles and Doubles Draws	(Chinese Taipei) Hsu Yu-hsiou (Austria) Neil Oberleitner; 7–5, 4–6, [10–8]	(Portugal) Fábio Coelho (Portugal) Gonçalo Falcão	(Netherlands) Alec Deckers (Lebanon) Hady Habib	(Japan) Makoto Ochi (United Kingdom) Anton Matusevich (Portugal) Pedro Araújo (Spain) Alejandro Moro Cañas
March 21	Calabasas, United States; Hard; M25; Singles and Doubles Draws	(Australia) Rinky Hijikata; 7–5, 6–2	(United Kingdom) Charles Broom	(United States) JC Aragone (Israel) Daniel Cukierman	(United States) Ezekiel Clark (South Korea) Nam Ji-sung (United States) Govind Nanda (United States) Victor Lilov
March 21	Calabasas, United States; Hard; M25; Singles and Doubles Draws	(South Korea) Nam Ji-sung (South Korea) Song Min-kyu; 6–3, 7–6^{(7–4)}	(United Kingdom) Charles Broom (United Kingdom) Henry Patten	(United States) JC Aragone (Israel) Daniel Cukierman	(United States) Ezekiel Clark (South Korea) Nam Ji-sung (United States) Govind Nanda (United States) Victor Lilov
March 21	Sharm El Sheikh, Egypt; Hard; M15; Singles and Doubles Draws	(Italy) Giovanni Oradini; 2–6, 6–3, 6–1	Kirill Kivattsev	(Argentina) Federico Agustín Gómez (Slovakia) Lukáš Pokorný	(Sweden) Filip Bergevi (South Korea) Son Ji-hoon (Italy) Lorenzo Rottoli (Belgium) Loïc Cloes
March 21	Sharm El Sheikh, Egypt; Hard; M15; Singles and Doubles Draws	Petr Bar Biryukov; Marat Sharipov; 6–7^{(6–8)}, 6–3, [10–8]	(Philippines) Francis Alcantara (Canada) Kelsey Stevenson	(Argentina) Federico Agustín Gómez (Slovakia) Lukáš Pokorný	(Sweden) Filip Bergevi (South Korea) Son Ji-hoon (Italy) Lorenzo Rottoli (Belgium) Loïc Cloes
March 21	New Delhi, India; Hard; M15; Singles and Doubles Draws	(India) Sidharth Rawat; 6–3, 6–2	(India) S D Prajwal Dev	(India) Siddharth Vishwakarma (India) Manish Sureshkumar	(France) Enzo Wallart (India) Nitin Kumar Sinha (India) Digvijay Pratap Singh (India) Dhakshineswar Suresh
March 21	New Delhi, India; Hard; M15; Singles and Doubles Draws	(India) Yuki Bhambri (India) Saketh Myneni; 6–4, 6–2	(India) Anirudh Chandrasekar (India) Vishnu Vardhan	(India) Siddharth Vishwakarma (India) Manish Sureshkumar	(France) Enzo Wallart (India) Nitin Kumar Sinha (India) Digvijay Pratap Singh (India) Dhakshineswar Suresh
March 21	Marrakesh, Morocco; Clay; M15; Singles and Doubles Draws	(Italy) Edoardo Lavagno; 6–4, 6–2	(Romania) David Ionel	(Morocco) Adam Moundir (France) Florent Bax	(Italy) Stefano Battaglino; Andrey Chepelev; Vladislav Ivanov (Italy) Marco Miceli
March 21	Marrakesh, Morocco; Clay; M15; Singles and Doubles Draws	(Austria) Philip Bachmaier; Ilya Rudiukov; 5–7, 7–6^{(7–2)}, [12–10]	(France) Florent Bax (France) Arthur Weber	(Morocco) Adam Moundir (France) Florent Bax	(Italy) Stefano Battaglino; Andrey Chepelev; Vladislav Ivanov (Italy) Marco Miceli
March 21	Palma Nova, Spain; Clay; M15; Singles and Doubles Draws	(Spain) Carlos López Montagud; 7–5, 3–6, 7–6^{(7–0)}	(Brazil) Oscar José Gutierrez	(Spain) Daniel Rincón (Spain) Miguel Damas	(Spain) Max Alcalá Gurri (Spain) Benjamín Winter López (Italy) Luigi Sorrentino (Spain) Àlex Martí Pujolràs
March 21	Palma Nova, Spain; Clay; M15; Singles and Doubles Draws	(Italy) Andrea Picchione (Italy) Gabriele Piraino; 7–5, 6–1	(Spain) Carlos López Montagud (Spain) Benjamín Winter López	(Spain) Daniel Rincón (Spain) Miguel Damas	(Spain) Max Alcalá Gurri (Spain) Benjamín Winter López (Italy) Luigi Sorrentino (Spain) Àlex Martí Pujolràs
March 21	Monastir, Tunisia; Hard; M15; Singles and Doubles Draws	(Bulgaria) Alexander Donski; 6–2, 5–7, 6–3	(France) Térence Atmane	(China) Li Hanwen (France) Clément Tabur	(Tunisia) Aziz Dougaz (Italy) Giorgio Tabacco (Ivory Coast) Eliakim Coulibaly (Germany) Maik Steiner
March 21	Monastir, Tunisia; Hard; M15; Singles and Doubles Draws	(Tunisia) Aziz Dougaz (Luxembourg) Alex Knaff; 6–2, 6–4	(Japan) Tomohiro Masabayashi (Japan) Ren Nakamura	(China) Li Hanwen (France) Clément Tabur	(Tunisia) Aziz Dougaz (Italy) Giorgio Tabacco (Ivory Coast) Eliakim Coulibaly (Germany) Maik Steiner
March 21	Antalya, Turkey; Clay; M15; Singles and Doubles Draws	(Japan) Yuki Mochizuki; 3–6, 6–1, 6–1	(Italy) Gianmarco Ferrari	(Netherlands) Max Houkes (Japan) Rimpei Kawakami	(Czech Republic) Daniel Siniakov; Ivan Gakhov (Moldova) Ilya Snițari (Italy) Alexander Weis
March 21	Antalya, Turkey; Clay; M15; Singles and Doubles Draws	Ivan Gakhov; Ivan Liutarevich; 6–4, 6–2	(Turkey) Umut Akkoyun (Turkey) Mert Naci Türker	(Netherlands) Max Houkes (Japan) Rimpei Kawakami	(Czech Republic) Daniel Siniakov; Ivan Gakhov (Moldova) Ilya Snițari (Italy) Alexander Weis
March 28	Rosario, Argentina; Clay; M25; Singles and Doubles Draws	(Argentina) Santiago Rodríguez Taverna; 4–6, 6–3, 6–3	(Argentina) Gonzalo Villanueva	(Bolivia) Murkel Dellien (United States) Oliver Crawford	(Argentina) Mariano Kestelboim (Argentina) Román Andrés Burruchaga (Argentina) Alejo Lorenzo Lingua Lavallén (Argentina) Mariano Navone
March 28	Rosario, Argentina; Clay; M25; Singles and Doubles Draws	(Bolivia) Murkel Dellien (Peru) Arklon Huertas del Pino; 6–3, 6–3	(Argentina) Tomás Farjat (Argentina) Ignacio Monzón	(Bolivia) Murkel Dellien (United States) Oliver Crawford	(Argentina) Mariano Kestelboim (Argentina) Román Andrés Burruchaga (Argentina) Alejo Lorenzo Lingua Lavallén (Argentina) Mariano Navone
March 28	Canberra, Australia; Clay; M25; Singles and Doubles Draws	(Australia) Jason Kubler; 1–6, 6–3, 7–6^{(7–4)}	(Australia) Omar Jasika	(Australia) Ken Cavrak (Australia) Li Tu	(Ukraine) Eric Vanshelboim (Australia) James McCabe (Australia) Philip Sekulic (Australia) Dayne Kelly
March 28	Canberra, Australia; Clay; M25; Singles and Doubles Draws	(Australia) Adam Taylor (Australia) Jason Taylor; 7–6^{(8–6)}, 4–6, [14–12]	(Australia) Matthew Romios (Ukraine) Eric Vanshelboim	(Australia) Ken Cavrak (Australia) Li Tu	(Ukraine) Eric Vanshelboim (Australia) James McCabe (Australia) Philip Sekulic (Australia) Dayne Kelly
March 28	Sharm El Sheikh, Egypt; Hard; M15; Singles and Doubles Draws	(Hungary) Péter Fajta; 7–6^{(7–5)}, 6–4	(Germany) Dominik Böhler	Alibek Kachmazov (Italy) Samuel Vincent Ruggeri	(Canada) Kelsey Stevenson (Egypt) Amr Elsayed (France) César Bourgois (Japan) Shuichi Sekiguchi
March 28	Sharm El Sheikh, Egypt; Hard; M15; Singles and Doubles Draws	(Italy) Francesco Vilardo (Italy) Samuel Vincent Ruggeri; 7–5, 6–4	Alibek Kachmazov; Marat Sharipov	Alibek Kachmazov (Italy) Samuel Vincent Ruggeri	(Canada) Kelsey Stevenson (Egypt) Amr Elsayed (France) César Bourgois (Japan) Shuichi Sekiguchi
March 28	Monastir, Tunisia; Hard; M15; Singles and Doubles Draws	(United Kingdom) Oscar Weightman; 6–2, 6–2	(Japan) Jumpei Yamasaki	(South Africa) Khololwam Montsi (China) Li Zhe	(Canada) Filip Peliwo (Argentina) Mateo Nicolás Martínez (China) Li Hanwen (Slovakia) Lukáš Palovič
March 28	Monastir, Tunisia; Hard; M15; Singles and Doubles Draws	(Poland) Szymon Kielan (Poland) Michał Mikuła; 7–6^{(7–4)}, 6–7^{(2–7)}, [10–2]	(Germany) Constantin Frantzen (Germany) Tim Sandkaulen	(South Africa) Khololwam Montsi (China) Li Zhe	(Canada) Filip Peliwo (Argentina) Mateo Nicolás Martínez (China) Li Hanwen (Slovakia) Lukáš Palovič
March 28	Antalya, Turkey; Clay; M15; Singles and Doubles Draws	(Serbia) Hamad Međedović; 6–0, 6–1	(Germany) Timo Stodder	(France) Valentin Royer (Turkey) Marsel İlhan	(Czech Republic) Michael Vrbenský (United Kingdom) Billy Harris; Ivan Gakhov (Romania) Sebastian Gima
March 28	Antalya, Turkey; Clay; M15; Singles and Doubles Draws	(Japan) Yuki Mochizuki (Japan) Kaito Uesugi; 6–4, 1–6, [10–8]	(United States) Fletcher Scott (Germany) Timo Stodder	(France) Valentin Royer (Turkey) Marsel İlhan	(Czech Republic) Michael Vrbenský (United Kingdom) Billy Harris; Ivan Gakhov (Romania) Sebastian Gima
