= 2025 Mziuri Cup =

- Date: 19–24 May
- Edition: 2nd
- Location: Tbilisi, Georgia

Champions

Singles
- (Georgia (country)) Saba Purtseladze

Doubles
- (Japan) Masamichi Imamura / (Japan) Naoki Tajima
- Mziuri Cup

The 2025 Mziuri Cup was a professional tennis tournament played on hardcourts. It was the second edition of the tournament which was part of the 2025 ATP Challenger Tour. It took place in Tbilisi, Georgia between 19 and 24 May 2025.

== Singles main-draw entrants ==
=== Seeds ===
Country	Player	Rank^{1}	Seed
GBR	Johannus Monday	250	1
	Ilia Simakin	264	2
CIV	Eliakim Coulibaly	271	3
GEO	Saba Purtseladze	288	4
CHN	Sun Fajing	289	5
LTU	Ričardas Berankis	294	6
~~GBR~~	~~Ryan Peniston~~	~~310~~	~~7~~
ITA	Federico Cinà	323	8
LAT	Robert Strombachs	333	9

- ^{1} Rankings are as of 5 May 2025.

=== Other entrants ===
The following players received wildcards into the singles main draw:

- (Georgia (country)) Aleksandre Bakshi
- (Moldova) Ilya Snițari
- (Georgia (country)) Zura Tkemaladze

The following player received entry into the singles main draw through the College Accelerator programme:

- (United Kingdom) Toby Samuel

The following player received entry into the singles main draw through the Junior Accelerator programme:

- (United Kingdom) ~~Charlie Robertson~~

The following player received entry into the singles main draw through the Next Gen Accelerator programme:

- (United Kingdom) Henry Searle

The following players received entry into the singles main draw as alternates:

- (France) Florent Bax
- (United Kingdom) Alastair Gray
- Evgeny Karlovskiy
- (Thailand) Kasidit Samrej

The following players received entry from the qualifying draw:

- (Italy) Fabrizio Andaloro
- (France) Clément Chidekh
- (United States) Martin Damm
- (Uzbekistan) Sergey Fomin
- (United Kingdom) Giles Hussey
- (Slovakia) Lukáš Pokorný

The following player received entry as a lucky loser:

- (Thailand) Maximus Jones

== Champions ==
=== Singles ===
- (Georgia (country)) Saba Purtseladze def. (Italy) Federico Cinà 7–6^{(7–5)}, 6–4.

=== Doubles ===
- (Japan) Masamichi Imamura / (Japan) Naoki Tajima def. (India) Siddhant Banthia / (India) Ramkumar Ramanathan 1–6, 6–3, [10–5].
