= Mziuri Cup =

- 2025 Mziuri Cup

ATP Challenger Tour
- Location: Tbilisi, Georgia
- Venue: Mziuri Park, Alex Metreveli Tennis Complex (2025), Ambassadori Academy (2024)
- Category: ATP Challenger Tour
- Surface: Hard
- Prize money: $60,000

The Mziuri Cup (formerly the Ambassadori Kachreti Challenger) is a professional tennis tournament played on hardcourts. It is currently part of the ATP Challenger Tour. It was first held in Kachreti, Georgia in 2024 at the Ambassadori Resort before being relocated to Tbilisi in 2025.

== Past finals ==
=== Singles ===
Year	Champion	Runner-up	Score
2025	(Georgia (country)) Saba Purtseladze	(Italy) Federico Cinà	7–6^{(7–5)}, 6–4
2024	(France) Robin Bertrand	(Georgia (country)) Aleksandre Bakshi	6–1, 3–6, 7–5

=== Doubles ===
Year	Champions	Runners-up	Score
2025	(Japan) Masamichi Imamura (Japan) Naoki Tajima	(India) Siddhant Banthia (India) Ramkumar Ramanathan	1–6, 6–3, [10–5]
2024	(United Kingdom) Charles Broom (United Kingdom) Ben Jones	Evgeny Karlovskiy; Evgenii Tiurnev	3–6, 6–1, [10–8]
