= Robin Bertrand =

French tennis player (born 2003)

- Country (sports): France
- Born: 15 March 2003 (age 23) Nîmes, France
- Height: 1.78 m (5 ft 10 in)
- Plays: Right-handed
- Prize money: US $274,356

Singles
- Career record: 0–0 (at ATP Tour level, Grand Slam level, and in Davis Cup)
- Career titles: 0; 1 Challenger
- Highest ranking: No. 260 (27 January 2025)
- Current ranking: No. 405 (9 November 2026)

Grand Slam singles results
- French Open: Q1 (2025, 2026)

Doubles
- Career record: 0–1 (at ATP Tour level, Grand Slam level, and in Davis Cup)
- Career titles: 0
- Highest ranking: No. 387 (12 January 2026)
- Current ranking: No. 741 (9 November 2026)
- Last updated on: 9 November 2026.

Robin Bertrand (born 15 March 2003) is a French tennis player. He has a career high ATP singles ranking of world No. 260 achieved on 27 January 2025 and a career high doubles ranking of No. 387 achieved on 12 January 2026.

== Professional career ==
=== 2022: ATP Tour doubles debut ===
Bertrand made his ATP main draw debut at the 2022 Open Sud de France after receiving a wildcard into the doubles main draw with Antoine Hoang. The pair lost in the first round.

=== 2024: Maiden Challenger title ===
In May, Bertrand won his maiden Challenger title in Kachreti, Georgia, defeating Aleksandre Bakshi in the final. He achieved his a new career-high ranking as a result of world No. 303 on 27 May 2024.

== Performance timeline ==
Key
W	F	SF	QF	#R	RR	Q#	DNQ	A	NH

(W) winner; (F) finalist; (SF) semifinalist; (QF) quarterfinalist; (#R) rounds 4, 3, 2, 1; (RR) round-robin stage; (Q#) qualification round; (DNQ) did not qualify; (A) absent; (NH) not held; (SR) strike rate (events won / competed); (W–L) win–loss record.

=== Singles ===
Tournament	2025	SR	W–L	Win%
Grand Slam tournaments
Australian Open	A	0 / 0	0–0	–
French Open	Q1	0 / 0	0–0	–
Wimbledon	A	0 / 0	0–0	–
US Open	A	0 / 0	0–0	–
Win–loss	0–0	0 / 0	0–0	–

== ATP Challenger Tour finals ==
=== Singles: 1 (1 title) ===
Legend ATP Challenger Tour (1–0)

Result	W–L	Date	Tournament	Tier	Surface	Opponent	Score
Win	1–0	May 2024	Kachreti, Georgia	Challenger	Hard	(Georgia (country)) Aleksandre Bakshi	6–1, 3–6, 7–5

== ITF World Tennis Tour finals ==
=== Singles: 16 (8 titles, 8 runner-ups) ===
Legend ITF WTT (8–8)	Finals by surface Hard (7–8) Clay (1–0) Grass (0–0) Carpet (0–0)

Result	W–L	Date	Tournament	Tier	Surface	Opponent	Score
Win	1–0	May 2022	M15 Oran, Algeria	WTT	Clay	(Algeria) Rayan Ghedjemis	5–7, 6–4, 6–1
Loss	1–1	Jul 2022	M15 Castelo Branco, Portugal	WTT	Hard	(Portugal) Jaime Faria	3–6, 6–7^{(6–8)}
Win	2–1	Sep 2022	M15 Monastir, Tunisia	WTT	Hard	Bekkhan Atlangeriev	6–7^{(10–12)}, 6–4, 6–0
Loss	2–2	Nov 2022	M15 Monastir, Tunisia	WTT	Hard	(Spain) Adrià Soriano Barrera	3–6, 3–6
Loss	2–3	Dec 2022	M15 Monastir, Tunisia	WTT	Hard	(United States) Omni Kumar	1–6, 2–6
Loss	2–4	Jan 2023	M15 Monastir, Tunisia	WTT	Hard	(Croatia) Mili Poljičak	1–6, 6–2, 4–6
Win	3–4	Sep 2023	M25 Monastir, Tunisia	WTT	Hard	(France) Ugo Blanchet	6–2, 2–6, 6–4
Win	4–4	Feb 2024	M15 Monastir, Tunisia	WTT	Hard	(Italy) Federico Iannaccone	6–1, 6–3
Loss	4–5	Apr 2024	M25 Sharm El Sheikh, Egypt	WTT	Hard	(Egypt) Mohamed Safwat	6–3, 2–6, 2–6
Win	5–5	Apr 2024	M15 Monastir, Tunisia	WTT	Hard	(Ivory Coast) Eliakim Coulibaly	7–6^{(7–3)}, 6–3
Loss	5–6	Jun 2024	M25 Bakio, Spain	WTT	Hard	(France) Clément Chidekh	6–7^{(3–7)}, 3–6
Win	6–6	Jun 2025	M25 Monastir, Tunisia	WTT	Hard	(Italy) Fabrizio Andaloro	6–3, 1–6, 6–3
Win	7–6	Jun 2025	M25 Monastir, Tunisia	WTT	Hard	(Ivory Coast) Eliakim Coulibaly	3–6, 6–3, 7–6^{(7–4)}
Loss	7–7	Sep 2025	M25 Sharm El Sheikh, Egypt	WTT	Hard	(Italy) Fabrizio Andaloro	6–4, 3–6, 4–6
Win	8–7	Dec 2025	M15 Monastir, Tunisia	WTT	Hard	(Greece) Dimitris Sakellaridis	6–2, 7–6^{(7–5)}
Loss	8–8	Apr 2025	M25 Monastir, Tunisia	WTT	Hard	(Turkey) Yanki Erel	1–6, 1–6
