= Aleksandre Bakshi =

Georgian tennis player

- Country (sports): Georgia
- Born: 23 July 1997 (age 29) Tbilisi, Georgia
- Height: 1.80 m (5 ft 11 in)
- Turned pro: 2019
- Plays: Left-handed (two-handed backhand)
- College: Texas A&M University (2015–2017); University of Oklahoma (2017–2019)
- Coach: Victor Bakshi
- Prize money: US $136,826

Singles
- Career record: 4–3 (at ATP Tour level, Grand Slam level, and in Davis Cup)
- Career titles: 0
- Highest ranking: No. 448 (19 May 2025)
- Current ranking: No. 675 (14 September 2026)

Grand Slam singles results
- Australian Open Junior: 1R (2015)

Doubles
- Career record: 5–5 (at ATP Tour level, Grand Slam level, and in Davis Cup)
- Career titles: 1 Challenger
- Highest ranking: No. 304 (23 June 2025)
- Current ranking: No. 1,392 (14 September 2026)

Grand Slam doubles results
- Australian Open Junior: 2R (2015)

Team competitions
- Davis Cup: 4–3
- Last updated on: 18 September 2026.

Aleksandre Bakshi (born 23 July 1997) is a Georgian tennis player. He has a career high ATP singles ranking of World No. 448 achieved on 19 May 2025 and a career high doubles ranking of No. 307 achieved on 23 September 2024. Bakshi has won six ITF doubles titles. He is currently the No. 2 Georgian player.

Bakshi represents Georgia at the Davis Cup, where he has a W/L record of 4–3.

== Career ==
He participated at the 2020 ATP Cup and at the 2022 ATP Cup as one of the five members of the Georgian team.

In May 2024, Bakshi reached his maiden Challenger final in Kachreti, Georgia, where he lost to Robin Bertrand.

== ATP Challenger and ITF Tour finals ==
=== Singles: 2 (0–2) ===
Legend (doubles) ATP Challenger Tour (0–1) ITF World Tennis Tour (0–1)	Titles by surface Hard (0–2) Clay (0–0)

Result	W–L	Date	Tournament	Tier	Surface	Opponent	Score
Loss	0–1	Dec 2019	M15 Doha, Qatar	World Tennis Tour	Hard	(Russia) Aslan Karatsev	6–3, 2–6, 2–6
Loss	0–2	May 2024	Kachreti, Georgia	Challenger	Hard	(France) Robin Bertrand	1–6, 6–3, 5–7

=== Doubles 16 (7–9) ===
Legend (doubles) ATP Challenger Tour (1–0) ITF Futures Tour (6–9)	Titles by surface Hard (6–4) Clay (1–5)

Result	W–L	Date	Tournament	Tier	Surface	Partner	Opponents	Score
Loss	0–1	Jul 2017	Georgia F1, Telavi	Futures	Clay	(Georgia (country)) George Tsivadze	(Bolivia) Boris Arias (Bolivia) Federico Zeballos	6–7^{(6–8)}, 6–7^{(5–7)}
Win	1–1	Jul 2018	Georgia F1, Telavi	Futures	Clay	(Georgia (country)) George Tsivadze	(Kazakhstan) Roman Khassanov (Ukraine) Vladyslav Orlov	7–6^{(7–4)}, 6–3
Loss	1–2	May 2021	M15 Tbilisi, Georgia	World Tennis Tour	Hard	(Georgia (country)) Zura Tkemaladze	(Uzbekistan) Sanjar Fayziev (Greece) Markos Kalovelonis	4–6, 6–3, [5–10]
Loss	1–3	Jul 2021	M25 Telavi, Georgia	World Tennis Tour	Clay	(Georgia (country)) Aleksandre Metreveli	(Belarus) Martin Borisiouk (Belarus) Aliaksandr Liaonenka	7–6^{(7–4)}, 2–6, [5–10]
Loss	1–4	Apr 2022	M15 Shymkent, Kazakhstan	World Tennis Tour	Clay	Yan Bondarevskiy	Alibek Kachmazov; Marat Sharipov	2–6, 3–6
Loss	1–5	May 2022	M15 Villach, Austria	World Tennis Tour	Clay	(Italy) Giovanni Oradini	(Austria) Sandro Kopp (Germany) Kai Lemstra	6–7^{(1–7)}, 6–7^{(3–7)}
Win	2–5	Jun 2022	M15 Heraklion, Greece	World Tennis Tour	Hard	(Germany) Kai Lemstra	(Switzerland) Adrian Bodmer (Austria) Jonas Trinker	7–6^{(7–3)}, 7–6^{(7–3)}
Win	3–5	Mar 2023	M15 Aktobe, Kazakhstan	World Tennis Tour	Hard	(Russia) Ivan Denisov	(Italy) Federico Bertuccioli (San Marino) Marco de Rossi	6–3, 6–7^{(5–7)}, [10–7]
Win	4–5	Mar 2023	M15 Heraklion, Greece	World Tennis Tour	Hard	(Germany) Kai Lemstra	(Republic of Ireland) Simon Carr (France) Francois Musitelli	6–3, 6–4
Loss	4–6	Nov 2023	M15 Zahra, Kuwait	World Tennis Tour	Hard	(Georgia (country)) Zura Tkemaladze	(Netherlands) Guy den Heijer (Netherlands) Sidane Pontjodikromo	3–6, 7–6^{(7–1)}, [7–10]
Loss	4–7	Dec 2023	M15 Zahra, Kuwait	World Tennis Tour	Hard	(Bulgaria) Petr Nesterov	(Netherlands) Dax Donders (Netherlands) Sidane Pontjodikromo	6–3, 6–7^{(3–7)}, [8–10]
Loss	4–8	Dec 2023	M15 Zahra, Kuwait	World Tennis Tour	Hard	(Georgia (country)) Zura Tkemaladze	(Ukraine) Aleksandr Braynin (Ukraine) Mykyta Riepkin	(W/O)
Win	5–8	Feb 2024	M15 Sharm El Sheikh, Egypt	World Tennis Tour	Hard	(Spain) David Perez Sanz	(South Africa) Philip Henning (United Kingdom) Ben Jones	4–6, 6–2, [10–4]
Win	6–8	Mar 2024	M15 Heraklion, Greece	World Tennis Tour	Hard	(Georgia (country)) Zura Tkemaladze	(Senegal) Seydina Andre (France) Nicolas Jadoun	6–2, 6–3
Win	6–9	Apr 2024	M15 Shymkent, Kazakhstan	World Tennis Tour	Clay	(Germany) Niklas Schell	(Kazakhstan) Grigoriy Lomakin (Russia) Pavel Verbin	6–7^{(1–7)}, 3–6
Win	10–9	Sep 2024	Istanbul, Turkey	Challenger	Hard	(Turkey) Yanki Erel	(Denmark) August Holmgren (Denmark) Johannes Ingildsen	7–6^{(7–4)}, 7–5

== Davis Cup ==
=== Participations: (4–3) ===
Group membership World Group (0–0) WG Play-off (0–0) Group I (0–0) Group II (0–1) Group III (4–2) Group IV (0–0)	Matches by surface Hard (2–2) Clay (2–1) Grass (0–0) Carpet (0–0)	Matches by type Singles (3–1) Doubles (1–2)

- ▲ ▼ indicates the outcome of the Davis Cup match followed by the score, date, place of event, the zonal classification and its phase, and the court surface.

Rubber outcome	No.	Rubber	Match type (partner if any)	Opponent nation	Opponent player(s)	Score
▲3–0; 8 May 2014; Gellért Leisure Center Szeged, Hungary; Europe Zone Group III Round Robin; Clay surface
Victory	1	I	Singles	Iceland	Raj-Kumar Bonifacius	6–2, 6–2
Victory	2	III	Doubles (with Giorgi Javakhishvili) (dead rubber)	Iceland	Raj-Kumar Bonifacius / Hinrik Helgason	6–0, 6–2
▼1–3; 13-14 September 2019; Njård Tennisklubb, Oslo, Norway; Europe/Africa Zone Group II First round; Clay surface
Defeat	3	III	Doubles (with Aleksandre Metreveli)	Norway	Viktor Durasovic / Casper Ruud	4–6, 3–6
▲3–0; 16 June 2021; Herodotou Tennis Academy, Larnaca, Cyprus; Europe Zone Group III Round robin; Hard surface
Victory	4	I	Singles	Iceland	Daniel Siddall	6–2, 6–2
▼0–3; 18 June 2021; Herodotou Tennis Academy, Larnaca, Cyprus; Europe Zone Group III Round robin; Hard surface
Defeat	5	I	Singles	Cyprus	Menelaos Efstathiou	3–6, 3–6
▼1–2; 19 June 2021; Herodotou Tennis Academy, Larnaca, Cyprus; Europe Zone Group III Promotional playoff; Hard surface
Victory	6	I	Singles	(Republic of Ireland) Ireland	Osgar O'Hoisin	6–4, 6–3
Defeat	7	III	Doubles (with Zura Tkemaladze)	(Republic of Ireland) Ireland	Simon Carr / David O'Hare	3–6, 1–6
