= Ben Jones (tennis) =

British tennis player

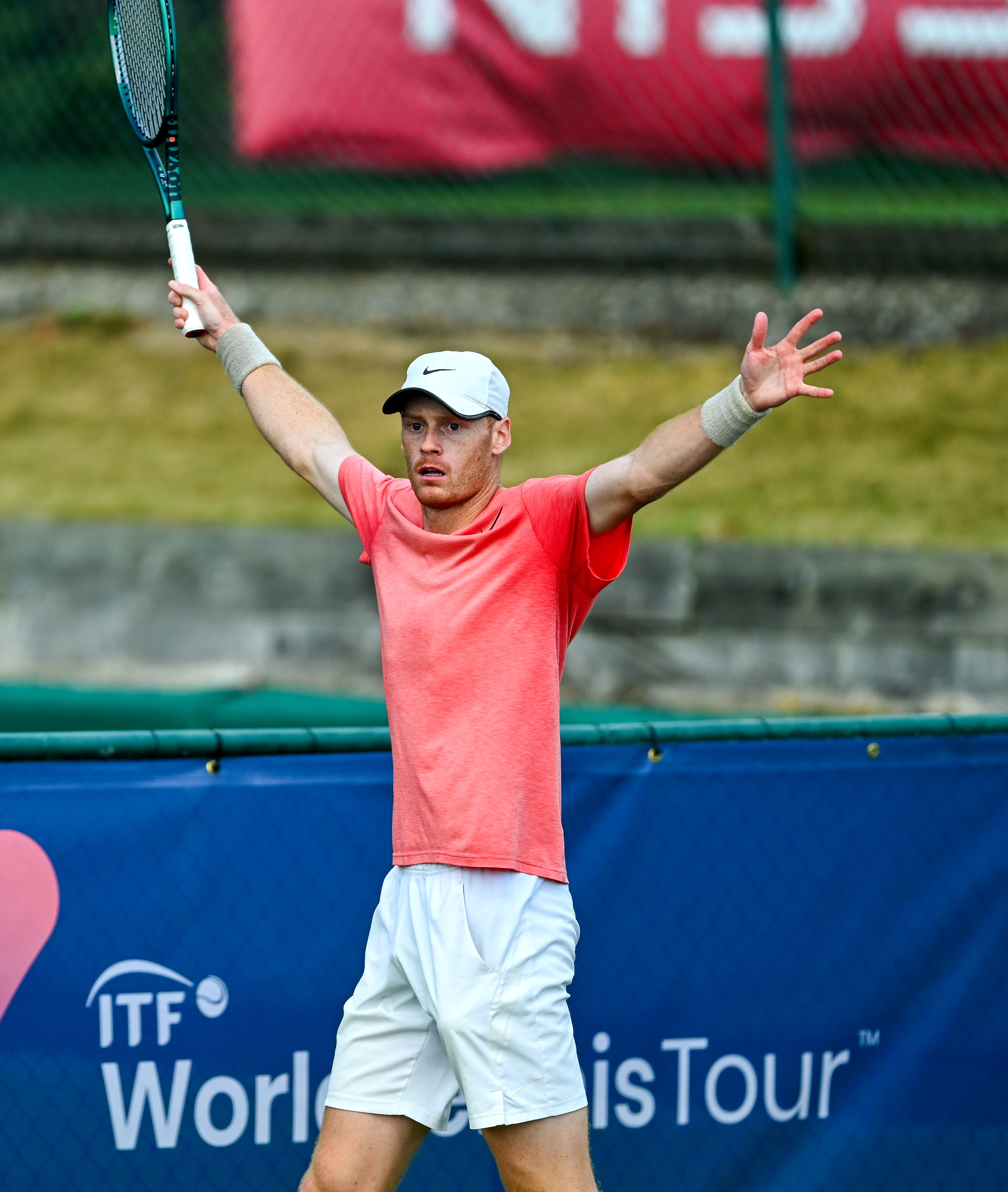
- Jones competing at the 2024 Irish Open.
- Full name: Ben Jones
- Country (sports): United Kingdom
- Born: 19 May 1998 (age 28) London
- Height: 1.93 m (6 ft 4 in)
- Plays: Right-handed, two handed backhand
- Prize money: US $119,989

Singles
- Highest ranking: No. 620 (19 May 2025)
- Current ranking: No. 741 (8 June 2026)

Doubles
- Career record: 0–0
- Career titles: 0
- Highest ranking: No. 149 (8 June 2026)
- Current ranking: No. 149 (8 June 2026)

Grand Slam doubles results
- Wimbledon: 1R (2026)

Grand Slam mixed doubles results
- Wimbledon: 2R (2026)
- Last updated on: 8 June 2026.

Ben Jones (born 19 May 1998) is a British tennis player who specializes in doubles. He has a career high doubles ranking of world No. 149 achieved on 8 June 2026. He has won two ATP Challenger Tour and 21 doubles ITF World Tennis Tour titles. He also has career-high singles ranking of No. 620 achieved on 19 May 2025.

== Career ==
In June 2019, Jones won his first professional doubles title at the $15k ITF World Tour event in Netanya, Israel, with Ukrainian partner Vladyslav Orlov defeating home pair Yannai Barkai and Jordan Hasson 7–6(4) 6–2 in the final.

In 2021, partnering Daniel Little, he won successive tournaments at M15 events in Sharm El Sheikh. He teamed up with Little again to win an M25 title in Toulouse in March 2022.

In August 2023, he won back-to-back doubles titles on the ITF tour in Israel alongside James Davis, defeating David Poljak and Hamish Stewart in the final of the second week at the M25 Herzlia event.

In May 2024, alongside Charles Broom, Jones won his first ATP Challenger title at the Kachreti Challenger in Georgia against Evgeny Karlovskiy and Evgenii Tiurnev 3–6, 6–1, 10–8. In August, Jones won his first professional singles title at the AIG Irish Open, an M15 event, defeating Polish player Filip Pieczonka in the final. At the same tournament, he also won the doubles event with Australian partner Joshua Charlton. In September, playing with Marvin Möller, Jones won the doubles title at the ITF M15 tournament in Växjö, Sweden.

== ATP Challenger Tour finals ==
=== Doubles: 7 (3 titles, 4 runner-ups) ===
Legend ATP Challenger Tour (3–4)

Result	W–L	Date	Tournament	Tier	Surface	Partner	Opponents	Score
Loss	0–1	Nov 2023	Calgary, Canada	Challenger	Hard (i)	(United Kingdom) Charles Broom	(Canada) Juan Carlos Aguilar (Canada) Justin Boulais	3–6, 2–6
Win	1–1	May 2024	Kachreti, Georgia	Challenger	Hard	(United Kingdom) Charles Broom	Evgeny Karlovskiy; Evgenii Tiurnev	3–6, 6–1, [10–8]
Loss	1–2	Jun 2025	Ilkley, United Kingdom	Challenger	Grass	(United Kingdom) Charles Broom	(Ecuador) Diego Hidalgo (United States) Patrik Trhac	3–6, 7–6^{(10–8)}, [7–10]
Loss	1–3	Jan 2026	Glasgow, United Kingdom	Challenger	Hard (i)	(United Kingdom) Charles Broom	(Germany) Christoph Negritu (Colombia) Adrià Soriano Barrera	6–2, 2–6, [4–10]
Loss	1–4	Feb 2026	Metepec, Mexico	Challenger	Hard	(United Kingdom) Scott Duncan	(United States) Pranav Kumar (United States) Karl Poling	2–6, 3–6
Win	2–4	Apr 2026	Wuning, China	Challenger	Hard	(Australia) Joshua Charlton	(Belgium) Buvaysar Gadamauri (United Kingdom) Giles Hussey	6–4, 6–2
Win	3–4	Jun 2026	Birmingham, United Kingdom	Challenger	Grass	(United Kingdom) Joshua Paris	(India) Anirudh Chandrasekar (Japan) Takeru Yuzuki	6–4, 7–6^{(7–4)}

== ITF World Tennis Tour finals ==
=== Singles: 1 (1 title) ===
Legend ITF WTT (1–0)

Result	W–L	Date	Tournament	Tier	Surface	Opponent	Score
Win	1–0	Aug 2024	Dublin	M15	Carpet	(Poland) Filip Pieczonka	6–4, 7-6(5)

== Personal life ==
From Suffolk, he helped the county win the national county title in 2018. He also attended the University of Bath where he studied Chemistry and won the Men's Doubles title at the BUCS Individual Championships alongside partner Tiarnan Brady in March 2018. While attending Bath, Jones represented the Great Britain students' team on three occasions (2018, 2019 and 2022) at the Master'U BNP Paribas event hosted in France - he played a pivotal role in securing a silver medal for the team in each of his three appearances. Ben also suffers from ulcerative colitis and has completed fundraisers to raise money for Crohn's and Colitis UK.
