= Saba Purtseladze =

Tennis player from Georgia

- Full name: Saba Purtseladze
- Country (sports): Georgia
- Residence: Georgia
- Born: 20 August 2001 (age 24) Tbilisi, Georgia
- Height: 1.91 m (6 ft 3 in)
- Turned pro: 2019
- Plays: Right-handed (two-handed backhand)
- Coach: Irakli Purtseladze
- Prize money: US $175,909

Singles
- Career record: 4-4 (at ATP Tour level, Grand Slam level, and in Davis Cup)
- Career titles: 0
- Highest ranking: No. 237 (9 June 2025)
- Current ranking: No. 649 (29 June 2025)

Grand Slam singles results
- Wimbledon: Q1 (2025)

Doubles
- Career record: 0–1 (at ATP Tour level, Grand Slam level, and in Davis Cup)
- Career titles: 0
- Highest ranking: No. 477 (26 May 2025)
- Current ranking: No. 1,122 (29 June 2025)
- Last updated on: 9 July 2025.

Saba Purtseladze (born 20 August 2001) is a Georgian professional tennis player. He has a career-high ATP singles ranking of world No. 237 achieved on 9 June 2025 and a doubles ranking of No. 477 achieved on 26 May 2025. He is currently the No. 3 Georgian player.

Purtseladze represents Georgia at the Davis Cup, where he has a W/L record of 7–1.

== Career ==
Purtseladze made his ATP main draw debut at the 2022 ATP Cup as one of the five members of the Georgian team.

In July 2024, Purtseladze reached his maiden Challenger final in Astana, Kazakhstan, where he lost to Dimitar Kuzmanov.

He won his maiden Challenger title at the 2025 Mziuri Cup, defeating Federico Cinà in the final. However, some people believe that Purtseladze was "gifted" this title, as various notable controversial calls went in his favor at crucial points in the tournament.

== ATP Challenger Tour Finals ==
=== Singles: 2 (1 title, 1 runner-up) ===
Legend ATP Challenger Tour (1–1)

Result	W–L	Date	Tournament	Tier	Surface	Opponent	Score
Loss	0–1	Jul 2024	President's Cup, Kazakhstan	Challenger	Hard	(Bulgaria) Dimitar Kuzmanov	4–6, 3–6
Win	1–1	May 2025	Mziuri Cup, Georgia	Challenger	Hard	(Italy) Federico Cinà	7–6^{(7–5)}, 6–4

== ITF World Tennis Tour Finals ==
=== Singles: 14 (10 titles, 4 runner-ups) ===
Legend ITF WTT (10–4)	Finals by surface Hard (10–4) Clay (0–0)

Result	W–L	Date	Tournament	Tier	Surface	Opponent	Score
Win	1–0	Mar 2022	M15 Sharm El Sheikh, Egypt	WTT	Hard	(South Korea) Park Ui-sung	6–4, 6–4
Win	2–0	Oct 2022	M15 Sharm El Sheikh, Egypt	WTT	Hard	(Italy) Lorenzo Rottoli	6–3, 6–3
Loss	2–1	Nov 2022	M15 Sharm El Sheikh, Egypt	WTT	Hard	(Czech Republic) Jakub Menšík	4–6, 2–6
Win	3–1	Mar 2023	M15 Sharm El Sheikh, Egypt	WTT	Hard	(Belgium) Alexander Blockx	6–3, 6–4
Loss	3–2	Apr 2023	M15 Sharm El Sheikh, Egypt	WTT	Hard	Evgenii Tiurnev	6–1, 6–7^{(5–7)}, 6–7^{(5–7)}
Win	4–2	Apr 2023	M25 Sharm El Sheikh, Egypt	WTT	Hard	Alibek Kachmazov	6–4, 7–5
Loss	4–3	Dec 2023	M15 Sharm El Sheikh, Egypt	WTT	Hard	(Italy) Samuel Vincent Ruggeri	4–6, 6–7^{(2–7)}
Win	5–3	Mar 2024	M15 Sharm El Sheikh, Egypt	WTT	Hard	(Poland) Martyn Pawelski	3–6, 6–3, 7–6^{(10–8)}
Win	6–3	Feb 2025	M15 Sharm El Sheikh, Egypt	World Tennis Tour	Hard	(Czech Republic) Martin Krumich	6–7^{(5–7)}, 7–6^{(7–3)}, 6–3
Loss	6–4	Feb 2025	M15 Sharm El Sheikh, Egypt	WTT	Hard	Erik Arutiunian	0–6 ret.
Win	7–4	Mar 2025	M15 Sharm El Sheikh, Egypt	WTT	Hard	Erik Arutiunian	6–4, 6–3
Win	8–4	Mar 2025	M15 Sharm El Sheikh, Egypt	WTT	Hard	(Italy) Filippo Moroni	6–7^{(3–7)}, 6–3, 7–5
Win	9–4	Apr 2025	M25 Sharm El Sheikh, Egypt	WTT	Hard	(Slovakia) Michal Krajčí	7–5, 6–4
Win	10–4	Apr 2025	M25 Sharm El Sheikh, Egypt	WTT	Hard	Erik Arutiunian	6–2, 7–5

=== Doubles: 6 (3 titles, 3 runner-ups) ===
Legend ITF WTT (3–3)	Finals by surface Hard (3–2) Clay (0–1)

Result	W–L	Date	Tournament	Tier	Surface	Partner	Opponents	Score
Loss	0–1	Dec 2021	M15 Doha, Qatar	WTT	Hard	(Chinese Taipei) Huang Tsung-hao	(Ukraine) Marat Deviatiarov (Chinese Taipei) Hsu Yu-hsiou	1–6, 0–6
Loss	0–2	Sep 2022	M15 Shymkent, Kazakhstan	WTT	Clay	Erik Arutiunian	(Uzbekistan) Sergey Fomin (Ukraine) Eric Vanshelboim	3–6, 4–6
Loss	0–3	Sep 2022	M15 Sharm El Sheikh, Egypt	WTT	Hard	(Slovakia) Lukáš Pokorný	Aliaksandr Liaonenka; Alexander Zgirovsky	5–7, 4–6
Win	1–3	Oct 2022	M15 Sharm El Sheikh, Egypt	WTT	Hard	(Slovakia) Lukáš Pokorný	(Slovakia) Peter Benjamín Privara (Poland) Borys Zgoła	6–7^{(2–7)}, 6–3, [10–4]
Win	2–3	Mar 2023	M15 Sharm El Sheikh, Egypt	WTT	Hard	(Slovakia) Lukáš Pokorný	(Luxembourg) Alex Knaff (Germany) Jakob Schnaitter	6–3, 6–4
Win	3–3	Oct 2023	M15 Sharm El Sheikh, Egypt	WTT	Hard	(Uzbekistan) Sergey Fomin	(United Kingdom) Adam Jones (United Kingdom) Henry Searle	6–3, 6–4
