= Zura Tkemaladze =

Georgian tennis player

- Country (sports): Georgia
- Residence: Tbilisi, Georgia
- Born: 4 June 2000 (age 25) Tbilisi, Georgia
- Plays: Right-handed (one-handed backhand)
- Prize money: $81,635

Singles
- Career record: 1–3 (at ATP Tour level, Grand Slam level, and in Davis Cup)
- Career titles: 1 ITF
- Highest ranking: No. 633 (17 July 2023)
- Current ranking: No. 791 (26 May 2025)

Doubles
- Career record: 1–2 (at ATP Tour level, Grand Slam level, and in Davis Cup)
- Career titles: 0
- Highest ranking: No. 540 (9 March 2020)
- Current ranking: No. 950 (26 May 2025)
- Last updated on: 31 May 2025.

Zura Tkemaladze (born 4 June 2000) is a Georgian tennis player. He has a career high ATP singles ranking of world No. 633, achieved on 17 July 2023 and a career high doubles ranking of No. 540, achieved on 9 March 2020.

Tkemaladze made his ATP main draw debut at the 2020 ATP Cup representing Georgia. He also participated in the 2022 ATP Cup as one of the five members of the Georgian team.

Tkemaladze represents Georgia at the Davis Cup, where he has a W/L record of 0–2.

== ATP Challenger and ITF World Tennis Tour finals ==
=== Singles: 1 (1–0) ===
Legend ATP Challenger Tour (0–0) ITF World Tennis Tour (1–0)	Finals by surface Hard (1–0) Clay (0–0)

Result	W–L	Date	Tournament	Tier	Surface	Opponent	Score
Win	1–0	Sep 2022	M15 Sharm El Sheikh, Egypt	World Tennis Tour	Hard	(Italy) Marcello Serafini	6–1, 6–4

=== Doubles: 9 (1–8) ===
Legend ATP Challenger Tour (0–0) ITF World Tennis Tour (1–8)	Finals by surface Hard (1–6) Clay (0–2)

Result	W–L	Date	Tournament	Tier	Surface	Partner	Opponent	Score
Loss	0–1	Sep 2019	M15 Cairo, Egypt	World Tennis Tour	Clay	(Russia) Roman Blokhin	(Slovenia) Tomás Lipovšek Puches (United States) Dennis Uspensky	1–6, 2–6
Loss	0–2	Dec 2019	M15 Doha, Qatar	World Tennis Tour	Hard	(Belgium) Zizou Bergs	(Sweden) Simon Freund (Sweden) Jonathan Mridha	1–6, 0–6
Loss	0–3	May 2021	M15 Tbilisi, Georgia	World Tennis Tour	Hard	(Georgia (country)) Aleksandre Bakshi	(Uzbekistan) Sanjar Fayziev (Greece) Markos Kalovelonis	4–6, 6–3, [5–10]
Loss	0–4	Jun 2023	M15 Duffel, Belgium	World Tennis Tour	Clay	(Belgium) Buvaysar Gadamauri	(Switzerland) Mika Brunold (Switzerland) Jakub Paul	2–6, 6–4, [3–10]
Loss	0–5	Oct 2023	M15 Telavi, Georgia	World Tennis Tour	Clay	(Kazakhstan) Grigoriy Lomakin	Teymuraz Gabashvili (Georgia (country)) Aleksandre Metreveli	4–6, 4–6
Loss	0–6	Nov 2023	M15 Zahra, Kuwait	World Tennis Tour	Hard	(Georgia (country)) Aleksandre Bakshi	(Netherlands) Guy den Heijer (Netherlands) Sidane Pontjodikromo	3–6, 7–6^{(7–1)}, [7–10]
Loss	0–7	Dec 2023	M15 Zahra, Kuwait	World Tennis Tour	Hard	(Georgia (country)) Aleksandre Bakshi	(Ukraine) Aleksandr Braynin (Ukraine) Mykyta Riepkin	(W/O)
Win	1–7	Mar 2024	M15 Heraklion, Greece	World Tennis Tour	Hard	(Georgia (country)) Aleksandre Bakshi	(Senegal) Seydina Andre (France) Nicolas Jadoun	6–2, 6–3
Loss	1–8	May 2024	M15 Tbilisi, Georgia	World Tennis Tour	Hard	(Georgia (country)) Aleksandre Bakshi	(Czech Republic) Marek Gengel (Kazakhstan) Grigoriy Lomakin	6–2, 6–7^{(3–7)}, [8–10]
