= 2026 Moldova Open – Doubles =

Doubles
- 2026 Moldova Open

Final
- Champions: (United States) George Goldhoff (United States) Theodore Winegar
- Runners-up: (United States) Nathaniel Lammons (United States) Jackson Withrow
- Score: 6–1, 6–4

Events
| Singles | Doubles |
- Moldova Open

Szymon Kielan and Filip Pieczonka were the defending champions but only Kielan chose to defend his title, partnering Siddhant Banthia. They lost in the semifinals to George Goldhoff and Theodore Winegar.

Goldhoff and Winegar won the title after defeating Nathaniel Lammons and Jackson Withrow 6–1, 6–4 in the final.

== Seeds ==
1. (Czech Republic) Andrew Paulson / (Australia) Matthew Romios (quarterfinals)
2. (United States) George Goldhoff / (United States) Theodore Winegar (champions)
3. (India) Siddhant Banthia / (Poland) Szymon Kielan (semifinals)
4. (Thailand) Pruchya Isaro / (India) Niki Kaliyanda Poonacha (first round)

== Draw ==
Key

- Q = Qualifier
- WC = Wild card
- LL = Lucky loser
- Alt = Alternate
- ITF = ITF entry
- PR = Protected ranking
- SR = Special ranking
- SE = Special exempt
- JE = Junior exempt
- JR = Junior Accelerator Programme entrant
- CO = College Accelerator Programme entrant
- NG = Next Gen Accelerator Program entrant
- w/o = Walkover
- r = Retired
- d = Defaulted

First round
1 | (Czech Republic) A Paulson (Australia) M Romios | 6 | 6
(Romania) V Cornea (Argentina) S Rodríguez Taverna | 3 | 1
(Moldova) R Albot (Kazakhstan) D Yevseyev | 6 | 5 | [10]
(United States) N Lammons (United States) J Withrow | 4 | 7 | [12]
4 | (Thailand) P Isaro (India) N Kaliyanda Poonacha | 1 | 4
(Romania) A Jecan (Romania) B Pavel | 6 | 6
(United Kingdom) L Broady (United Kingdom) M Whitehouse | 7 | 4 | [19]
(Poland) K Drzewiecki (Poland) P Matuszewski | 5 | 6 | [17]
PR | (Moldova) A Cozbinov (Moldova) I Snițari | 6 | 6
(Brazil) D Dutra da Silva (Ukraine) V Orlov | 3 | 4
(Australia) T Fancutt (New Zealand) A Rai | 6 | 5 | [6]
3 | (India) S Banthia (Poland) S Kielan | 3 | 7 | [10]
(Spain) Í Cervantes (Ukraine) D Molchanov | 3 | 6 | [6]
(India) A Kadhe (Brazil) M Zormann | 6 | 4 | [10]
(Czech Republic) F Duda (Serbia) S Latinović | 2 | 3
2 | (United States) G Goldhoff (United States) T Winegar | 6 | 6

Quarterfinals
1 | (Czech Republic) A Paulson (Australia) M Romios | 5 | 6 | [5]
(United States) N Lammons (United States) J Withrow | 7 | 3 | [10]
(Romania) A Jecan (Romania) B Pavel | 3 | 6 | [11]
(United Kingdom) L Broady (United Kingdom) M Whitehouse | 6 | 3 | [9]
PR | (Moldova) A Cozbinov (Moldova) I Snițari | 2 | 6^{4}
3 | (India) S Banthia (Poland) S Kielan | 6 | 7^{7}
(India) A Kadhe (Brazil) M Zormann | 0 | 4
2 | (United States) G Goldhoff (United States) T Winegar | 6 | 6

Semifinals
(United States) N Lammons (United States) J Withrow | 7^{7} | 6
(Romania) A Jecan (Romania) B Pavel | 6^{3} | 4
3 | (India) S Banthia (Poland) S Kielan | 7^{8} | 2 | [4]
2 | (United States) G Goldhoff (United States) T Winegar | 6^{6} | 6 | [10]

Final
(United States) N Lammons (United States) J Withrow | 1 | 4
2 | (United States) G Goldhoff (United States) T Winegar | 6 | 6
