= 2025 Moldova Open – Doubles =

Doubles
- 2025 Moldova Open

Final
- Champions: (Poland) Szymon Kielan (Poland) Filip Pieczonka
- Runners-up: (Slovakia) Lukáš Pokorný; Ilia Simakin
- Score: 6–4, 6–0

Events
| Singles | Doubles |
- Moldova Open

This was the first edition of the tournament.

Szymon Kielan and Filip Pieczonka won the title after defeating Lukáš Pokorný and Ilia Simakin 6–4, 6–0 in the final.

== Seeds ==
1. (India) Siddhant Banthia / (India) Ramkumar Ramanathan (semifinals)
2. (Slovakia) Lukáš Pokorný / Ilia Simakin (final)
3. (United Kingdom) Ben Jones / (Czech Republic) David Poljak (first round)
4. (Poland) Szymon Kielan / (Poland) Filip Pieczonka (champions)

== Draw ==
Key

- Q = Qualifier
- WC = Wild card
- LL = Lucky loser
- Alt = Alternate
- ITF = ITF entry
- PR = Protected ranking
- SR = Special ranking
- SE = Special exempt
- JE = Junior exempt
- JR = Junior Accelerator Programme entrant
- CO = College Accelerator Programme entrant
- NG = Next Gen Accelerator Program entrant
- w/o = Walkover
- r = Retired
- d = Defaulted

=== Draw ===
First round
1 | (India) S Banthia (India) R Ramanathan | 6 | 4 | [10]
(Japan) K Uchida (Kazakhstan) D Yevseyev | 4 | 6 | [8]
P Bar Biryukov (Georgia (country)) S Purtseladze | 4 | 6 | [10]
WC | (Latvia) Daniel Morozov (Moldova) I Snițari | 6 | 4 | [8]
4 | (Poland) S Kielan (Poland) F Pieczonka | 4 | 7^{7} | [10]
D Golubev (Austria) D Pichler | 6 | 6^{1} | [2]
(South Africa) P Henning (Zimbabwe) CJ Lock | 6 | 6
WC | (Cyprus) E Neos; Semen Pankin | 4 | 4
(Colombia) C Rodríguez (Colombia) A Urrea | 6^{5} | 4
(Georgia (country)) A Bakshi (Latvia) R Strombachs | 7^{7} | 6
PR | (India) Sai Karteek Reddy Ganta (India) Parikshit Somani | 6 | 3 | [10]
3 | (United Kingdom) B Jones (Czech Republic) D Poljak | 4 | 6 | [6]
(Canada) K Stevenson (United Kingdom) H Wendelken | 7^{7} | 7
(Bulgaria) A Genov (United Kingdom) T Hands | 6^{3} | 5
(Japan) M Imamura (Japan) N Tajima | 6 | 5 | [5]
2 | (Slovakia) L Pokorný; I Simakin | 4 | 7 | [10]

Quarterfinals
1 | (India) S Banthia (India) R Ramanathan | w/o
P Bar Biryukov (Georgia (country)) S Purtseladze
4 | (Poland) S Kielan (Poland) F Pieczonka | 6 | 4 | [10]
(South Africa) P Henning (Zimbabwe) CJ Lock | 3 | 6 | [4]
(Georgia (country)) A Bakshi (Latvia) R Strombachs | 6 | 6
PR | (India) SKR Ganta (India) P Somani | 1 | 2
(Canada) K Stevenson (United Kingdom) H Wendelken | 2 | 2
2 | (Slovakia) L Pokorný; I Simakin | 6 | 6

Semifinals
1 | (India) S Banthia (India) R Ramanathan | 2 | 6 | [3]
4 | (Poland) S Kielan (Poland) F Pieczonka | 6 | 1 | [10]
(Georgia (country)) A Bakshi (Latvia) R Strombachs | 6^{5} | 6^{8}
2 | (Slovakia) L Pokorný; I Simakin | 7^{7} | 7^{10}

Final
4 | (Poland) S Kielan (Poland) F Pieczonka | 6 | 6
2 | (Slovakia) L Pokorný; I Simakin | 4 | 0
