= 2023 ITF Men's World Tennis Tour (January–March) =

The 2023 ITF Men's World Tennis Tour is the 2023 edition of the second-tier tour for men's professional tennis. It is organised by the International Tennis Federation and is a tier below the ATP Challenger Tour. The ITF Men's World Tennis Tour includes tournaments with prize money ranging from $15,000 to $25,000.

Since 2022, following the Russian invasion of Ukraine the ITF announced that players from Belarus and Russia could still play on the tour but would not be allowed to play under the flag of Belarus or Russia.

== Key ==
M25 tournaments
M15 tournaments

== Month ==
=== January ===
Week of	Tournament	Winner	Runners-up	Semifinalists	Quarterfinalists
January 2	Malibu, United States; Hard; M25; Singles and Doubles Draws	(United Kingdom) Arthur Fery; 6–4, 2–6, 6–4	(United States) Alex Michelsen	(United States) Zachary Svajda (United States) Learner Tien	(Moldova) Alexander Cozbinov (United States) Garrett Johns (United States) Strong Kirchheimer (Romania) Gabi Adrian Boitan
January 2	Malibu, United States; Hard; M25; Singles and Doubles Draws	All doubles competition was cancelled due to poor weather		(United States) Zachary Svajda (United States) Learner Tien	(Moldova) Alexander Cozbinov (United States) Garrett Johns (United States) Strong Kirchheimer (Romania) Gabi Adrian Boitan
January 2	Monastir, Tunisia; Hard; M15; Singles and Doubles Draws	(Netherlands) Guy den Ouden; 7–5, 6–2	Bogdan Bobrov	(Bulgaria) Petr Nesterov (Switzerland) Kilian Feldbausch	(Spain) David Pérez Sanz (Monaco) Lucas Catarina (France) Maxence Beaugé (Hungary) Péter Fajta
January 2	Monastir, Tunisia; Hard; M15; Singles and Doubles Draws	Bogdan Bobrov (Spain) David Pérez Sanz; 6–2, 6–3	(France) Mathieu Scaglia (France) Louis Tessa	(Bulgaria) Petr Nesterov (Switzerland) Kilian Feldbausch	(Spain) David Pérez Sanz (Monaco) Lucas Catarina (France) Maxence Beaugé (Hungary) Péter Fajta
January 9	Loughborough, United Kingdom; Hard (i); M25; Singles and Doubles Draws	(France) Clément Chidekh; 6–4, 6–2	(United Kingdom) George Loffhagen	(United Kingdom) Harry Wendelken (France) Jules Marie	(United Kingdom) Patrick Brady (United Kingdom) Aidan McHugh (Bosnia and Herzegovina) Mirza Bašić (United Kingdom) Anton Matusevich
January 9	Loughborough, United Kingdom; Hard (i); M25; Singles and Doubles Draws	(United Kingdom) Tom Hands (United Kingdom) George Houghton; 6–0, 6–3	(United Kingdom) Ben Jones (United Kingdom) Mark Whitehouse	(United Kingdom) Harry Wendelken (France) Jules Marie	(United Kingdom) Patrick Brady (United Kingdom) Aidan McHugh (Bosnia and Herzegovina) Mirza Bašić (United Kingdom) Anton Matusevich
January 9	Veigy-Foncenex, France; Carpet (i); M25; Singles and Doubles Draws	(Austria) Neil Oberleitner; 6–4, 6–2	(Germany) Matthias Bachinger	(France) Matteo Martineau (United Kingdom) Giles Hussey	Nikolay Vylegzhanin; Kirill Kivattsev (Germany) Robert Strombachs; Mikalai Haliak
January 9	Veigy-Foncenex, France; Carpet (i); M25; Singles and Doubles Draws	(Croatia) Zvonimir Babić (Germany) Niklas Schell; 6–4, 6–7^{(5–7)}, [10–8]	(France) Tristan Lamasine (France) Matteo Martineau	(France) Matteo Martineau (United Kingdom) Giles Hussey	Nikolay Vylegzhanin; Kirill Kivattsev (Germany) Robert Strombachs; Mikalai Haliak
January 9	Manacor, Spain; Hard; M15; Singles and Doubles Draws	(Spain) Álvaro López San Martín; 6–4, 3–6, 7–5	(Spain) Daniel Rincón	(Jordan) Abedallah Shelbayh (Bulgaria) Nikolay Nedelchev	(Spain) Imanol López Morillo (Japan) Naoya Honda (Germany) Jakob Schnaitter (Paraguay) Daniel Vallejo
January 9	Manacor, Spain; Hard; M15; Singles and Doubles Draws	(Spain) Daniel Rincón (Paraguay) Daniel Vallejo; 6–4, 7–6^{(7–5)}	Svyatoslav Gulin (Moldova) Ilya Snițari	(Jordan) Abedallah Shelbayh (Bulgaria) Nikolay Nedelchev	(Spain) Imanol López Morillo (Japan) Naoya Honda (Germany) Jakob Schnaitter (Paraguay) Daniel Vallejo
January 9	Doha, Qatar; Hard; M15; Singles and Doubles Draws	(Estonia) Kristjan Tamm; 6–4, 7–6^{(7–5)}	(Australia) Bernard Tomic	(Uzbekistan) Khumoyun Sultanov (Turkey) Yankı Erel	(Romania) Marius Copil; Marat Sharipov (Netherlands) Deney Wassermann (Belgium) Tibo Colson
January 9	Doha, Qatar; Hard; M15; Singles and Doubles Draws	(India) Parikshit Somani (Uzbekistan) Khumoyun Sultanov; 7–6^{(7–3)}, 6–2	(Italy) Jacopo Berrettini (Estonia) Kristjan Tamm	(Uzbekistan) Khumoyun Sultanov (Turkey) Yankı Erel	(Romania) Marius Copil; Marat Sharipov (Netherlands) Deney Wassermann (Belgium) Tibo Colson
January 9	Antalya, Turkey; Clay; M15; Singles and Doubles Draws	(Sweden) Dragoș Nicolae Mădăraș; 6–3, 7–5	(Spain) Àlex Martí Pujolràs	(Israel) Yshai Oliel; Sergei Pogosian	(Germany) Tom Gentzsch (France) Arthur Reymond (Turkey) Sarp Ağabigün (France) Quentin Folliot
January 9	Antalya, Turkey; Clay; M15; Singles and Doubles Draws	Aleksandr Lobanov (Uzbekistan) Maxim Shin; 6–3, 6–4	(Germany) Tom Gentzsch (Germany) Adrian Oetzbach	(Israel) Yshai Oliel; Sergei Pogosian	(Germany) Tom Gentzsch (France) Arthur Reymond (Turkey) Sarp Ağabigün (France) Quentin Folliot
January 9	Monastir, Tunisia; Hard; M15; Singles and Doubles Draws	(France) Lilian Marmousez; 4–6, 6–1, 6–0	(Spain) David Pérez Sanz	(Italy) Federico Iannaccone (Croatia) Mili Poljičak	(Romania) Sebastian Gima (Australia) Tom Evans (Monaco) Lucas Catarina (Japan) Shohei Chikami
January 9	Monastir, Tunisia; Hard; M15; Singles and Doubles Draws	(Spain) David Pérez Sanz (Germany) Kai Wehnelt; 6–4, 6–4	(Japan) Shohei Chikami (Japan) Ryuki Matsuda	(Italy) Federico Iannaccone (Croatia) Mili Poljičak	(Romania) Sebastian Gima (Australia) Tom Evans (Monaco) Lucas Catarina (Japan) Shohei Chikami
January 16	Manacor, Spain; Hard; M25; Singles and Doubles Draws	(Spain) Daniel Rincón; 6–3, 6–3	(United Kingdom) Felix Gill	(Spain) Pol Martín Tiffon; Alexey Vatutin	(Jordan) Abedallah Shelbayh (Germany) Rudolf Molleker (Spain) Miguel Damas (Spain) Álvaro López San Martín
January 16	Manacor, Spain; Hard; M25; Singles and Doubles Draws	(Spain) Alberto Barroso Campos (Spain) Imanol López Morillo; 6–3, 6–0	(Germany) Sebastian Fanselow (Denmark) Christian Sigsgaard	(Spain) Pol Martín Tiffon; Alexey Vatutin	(Jordan) Abedallah Shelbayh (Germany) Rudolf Molleker (Spain) Miguel Damas (Spain) Álvaro López San Martín
January 16	Sheffield, United Kingdom; Hard (i); M25; Singles and Doubles Draws	(United Kingdom) Daniel Little; 6–3, 6–4	(United Kingdom) Charles Broom	(United Kingdom) Alastair Gray (France) Clément Chidekh	(United Kingdom) Aidan McHugh (France) Antoine Hoang (United Kingdom) Daniel Cox (France) Jules Marie
January 16	Sheffield, United Kingdom; Hard (i); M25; Singles and Doubles Draws	(United Kingdom) Scott Duncan (United Kingdom) Marcus Willis; 6–3, 6–4	(France) Corentin Denolly (Sweden) Simon Freund	(United Kingdom) Alastair Gray (France) Clément Chidekh	(United Kingdom) Aidan McHugh (France) Antoine Hoang (United Kingdom) Daniel Cox (France) Jules Marie
January 16	Doha, Qatar; Hard; M25; Singles and Doubles Draws	(Morocco) Elliot Benchetrit; 6–4, 6–3	Bogdan Bobrov	(Australia) Bernard Tomic (Georgia (country)) Aleksandre Bakshi	(Italy) Jacopo Berrettini (Uzbekistan) Khumoyun Sultanov (France) Jaimee Floyd Angele (France) Maxime Chazal
January 16	Doha, Qatar; Hard; M25; Singles and Doubles Draws	(Netherlands) Dax Donders (Netherlands) Sidané Pontjodikromo; 3–6, 7–5, [10–2]	(India) Parikshit Somani (Uzbekistan) Khumoyun Sultanov	(Australia) Bernard Tomic (Georgia (country)) Aleksandre Bakshi	(Italy) Jacopo Berrettini (Uzbekistan) Khumoyun Sultanov (France) Jaimee Floyd Angele (France) Maxime Chazal
January 16	Jakarta, Indonesia; Hard; M15; Singles and Doubles Draws	(France) Arthur Weber; 6–4, 3–6, 6–3	(India) Sidharth Rawat	(Australia) Thomas Fancutt (Chinese Taipei) Huang Tsung-hao	(South Korea) Shin San-hui (India) Niki Kaliyanda Poonacha (South Korea) Lee Jea-moon; Marat Sharipov
January 16	Jakarta, Indonesia; Hard; M15; Singles and Doubles Draws	(Indonesia) Nathan Anthony Barki (Indonesia) Christopher Rungkat; 6–2, 6–4	(Chinese Taipei) Huang Tsung-hao (South Korea) Lee Duck-hee	(Australia) Thomas Fancutt (Chinese Taipei) Huang Tsung-hao	(South Korea) Shin San-hui (India) Niki Kaliyanda Poonacha (South Korea) Lee Jea-moon; Marat Sharipov
January 16	Vilnius, Lithuania; Hard; M15; Singles and Doubles Draws	(Lithuania) Edas Butvilas; 6–1, 7–5	(Poland) Szymon Kielan	Kirill Kivattsev (Czech Republic) Jiří Barnat	(Netherlands) Mick Veldheer (Ukraine) Illya Beloborodko (Slovakia) Lukáš Pokorný (Slovakia) Miloš Karol
January 16	Vilnius, Lithuania; Hard; M15; Singles and Doubles Draws	(Ukraine) Illya Beloborodko (Ukraine) Viacheslav Bielinskyi; 6–1, 4–6, [10–3]	(Italy) Federico Bertuccioli; Kirill Kivattsev	Kirill Kivattsev (Czech Republic) Jiří Barnat	(Netherlands) Mick Veldheer (Ukraine) Illya Beloborodko (Slovakia) Lukáš Pokorný (Slovakia) Miloš Karol
January 16	Bressuire, France; Hard (i); M15; Singles and Doubles Draws	(Belgium) Gauthier Onclin; 7–5, 6–3	(France) Lucas Poullain	(France) Antoine Ghibaudo (France) Tristan Lamasine	(France) Adrien Gobat (France) Sean Cuenin (France) Émilien Voisin (Germany) Leopold Zima
January 16	Bressuire, France; Hard (i); M15; Singles and Doubles Draws	(France) Grégoire Jacq (France) Tristan Lamasine; 6–4, 7–5	(Switzerland) Luca Castelnuovo (Switzerland) Yannik Steinegger	(France) Antoine Ghibaudo (France) Tristan Lamasine	(France) Adrien Gobat (France) Sean Cuenin (France) Émilien Voisin (Germany) Leopold Zima
January 16	Ithaca, United States; Hard; M15; Singles and Doubles Draws	(Romania) Radu Mihai Papoe; 1–6, 6–4, 6–2	(Barbados) Darian King	(United States) Chad Kissell (United States) Mac Kiger	(United States) Kyle Seelig (United States) Joshua Sheehy (United States) Nick Chappell (United States) Strong Kirchheimer
January 16	Ithaca, United States; Hard; M15; Singles and Doubles Draws	(United States) Nick Chappell (United States) Nathan Ponwith; 6–2, 6–4	(United States) Mac Kiger (Canada) Benjamin Sigouin	(United States) Chad Kissell (United States) Mac Kiger	(United States) Kyle Seelig (United States) Joshua Sheehy (United States) Nick Chappell (United States) Strong Kirchheimer
January 16	Antalya, Turkey; Clay; M15; Singles and Doubles Draws	(Sweden) Dragoș Nicolae Mădăraș; 6–3, 6–2	(Bulgaria) Yanaki Milev	(Spain) Àlex Martí Pujolràs (France) Arthur Reymond	(Argentina) Alex Barrena (Hungary) Gergely Madarász (Turkey) Mert Alkaya (Italy) Antonio Massara
January 16	Antalya, Turkey; Clay; M15; Singles and Doubles Draws	(Bulgaria) Yanaki Milev (Austria) Matthias Ujvary; 3–6, 6–2, [10–6]	(France) Quentin Folliot (France) Arthur Reymond	(Spain) Àlex Martí Pujolràs (France) Arthur Reymond	(Argentina) Alex Barrena (Hungary) Gergely Madarász (Turkey) Mert Alkaya (Italy) Antonio Massara
January 16	Monastir, Tunisia; Hard; M15; Singles and Doubles Draws	(Croatia) Mili Poljičak; 6–1, 2–6, 6–4	(France) Robin Bertrand	(Portugal) Gonçalo Oliveira (Spain) John Echeverría	(North Macedonia) Kalin Ivanovski (Germany) Kai Wehnelt (Egypt) Yusuf Khamis (Italy) Fausto Tabacco
January 16	Monastir, Tunisia; Hard; M15; Singles and Doubles Draws	(Spain) David Pérez Sanz (Germany) Kai Wehnelt; 6–1, 6–0	(Spain) John Echeverría (France) Nicolas Tepmahc	(Portugal) Gonçalo Oliveira (Spain) John Echeverría	(North Macedonia) Kalin Ivanovski (Germany) Kai Wehnelt (Egypt) Yusuf Khamis (Italy) Fausto Tabacco
January 23	Al Zahra, Kuwait; Hard; M25; Singles and Doubles Draws	(India) Prajnesh Gunneswaran; 6–2, 7–6^{(7–5)}	(Uzbekistan) Khumoyun Sultanov	(Turkey) Yankı Erel (Lebanon) Benjamin Hassan	(Netherlands) Sidané Pontjodikromo (Morocco) Elliot Benchetrit (Czech Republic) Jakub Menšík (Senegal) Seydina André
January 23	Al Zahra, Kuwait; Hard; M25; Singles and Doubles Draws	(Netherlands) Dax Donders (Netherlands) Sidané Pontjodikromo; 6–2, 6–4	(Ukraine) Igor Dudun (Ukraine) Artem Podorozhnyi	(Turkey) Yankı Erel (Lebanon) Benjamin Hassan	(Netherlands) Sidané Pontjodikromo (Morocco) Elliot Benchetrit (Czech Republic) Jakub Menšík (Senegal) Seydina André
January 23	Nußloch, Germany; Carpet (i); M25; Singles and Doubles Draws	(Germany) Daniel Masur; 6–3, 2–6, 7–6^{(7–1)}	(France) Matteo Martineau	(United Kingdom) Jan Choinski (Syria) Hazem Naw	(Germany) Florian Broska (Germany) Peter Heller (Germany) Elmar Ejupovic (Germany) Jannik Opitz
January 23	Nußloch, Germany; Carpet (i); M25; Singles and Doubles Draws	(Germany) Johannes Härteis (Germany) Peter Heller; 3–6, 7–5, [10–6]	(France) Tristan Lamasine (France) Matteo Martineau	(United Kingdom) Jan Choinski (Syria) Hazem Naw	(Germany) Florian Broska (Germany) Peter Heller (Germany) Elmar Ejupovic (Germany) Jannik Opitz
January 23	Sunderland, United Kingdom; Hard (i); M25; Singles and Doubles Draws	(France) Clément Chidekh; Walkover	(United Kingdom) Anton Matusevich	(Italy) Gianmarco Ferrari (United States) Martin Damm	(Israel) Edan Leshem (France) Antoine Hoang (United States) Tristan McCormick (Israel) Daniel Cukierman
January 23	Sunderland, United Kingdom; Hard (i); M25; Singles and Doubles Draws	(Israel) Daniel Cukierman (Israel) Edan Leshem; 2–6, 6–1, [10–3]	(United Kingdom) Anton Matusevich (United Kingdom) Joshua Paris	(Italy) Gianmarco Ferrari (United States) Martin Damm	(Israel) Edan Leshem (France) Antoine Hoang (United States) Tristan McCormick (Israel) Daniel Cukierman
January 23	Manacor, Spain; Hard; M25; Singles and Doubles Draws	(Spain) Daniel Rincón; 7–6^{(7–0)}, 3–6, 7–6^{(11–9)}	(Jordan) Abedallah Shelbayh	(Spain) Martín Landaluce (Germany) Sebastian Fanselow	(Spain) Nikolás Sánchez Izquierdo (Ivory Coast) Eliakim Coulibaly (Spain) Álvaro López San Martín (Luxembourg) Alex Knaff
January 23	Manacor, Spain; Hard; M25; Singles and Doubles Draws	(Sweden) Filip Bergevi (Luxembourg) Alex Knaff; 3–6, 6–3, [16–14]	(Spain) Alberto Barroso Campos (Spain) Imanol López Morillo	(Spain) Martín Landaluce (Germany) Sebastian Fanselow	(Spain) Nikolás Sánchez Izquierdo (Ivory Coast) Eliakim Coulibaly (Spain) Álvaro López San Martín (Luxembourg) Alex Knaff
January 23	Wesley Chapel, United States; Hard; M25; Singles and Doubles Draws	(United States) Nathan Ponwith; 6–3, 6–2	(United States) Christian Langmo	(United States) Alfredo Perez (United States) Zachary Svajda	(Peru) Ignacio Buse (United States) Matthew Segura (Northern Mariana Islands) Colin Sinclair (Portugal) Duarte Vale
January 23	Wesley Chapel, United States; Hard; M25; Singles and Doubles Draws	(Dominican Republic) Roberto Cid Subervi (United States) Alfredo Perez; 6–3, 6–2	(United States) Sekou Bangoura (Canada) Roy Stepanov	(United States) Alfredo Perez (United States) Zachary Svajda	(Peru) Ignacio Buse (United States) Matthew Segura (Northern Mariana Islands) Colin Sinclair (Portugal) Duarte Vale
January 23	Bagnoles-de-l'Orne, France; Clay (i); M15; Singles and Doubles Draws	(France) Sean Cuenin; 6–3, 6–3	(Monaco) Lucas Catarina	(Italy) Riccardo Balzerani (France) Constantin Bittoun Kouzmine	(France) Émilien Voisin (France) Rayane Oumaouche (France) Maxime Mora (France) Adrien Gobat
January 23	Bagnoles-de-l'Orne, France; Clay (i); M15; Singles and Doubles Draws	(France) Lucas Bouquet (France) Quentin Folliot; 6–2, 7–6^{(7–3)}	(France) Mayeul Darras (France) Émilien Voisin	(Italy) Riccardo Balzerani (France) Constantin Bittoun Kouzmine	(France) Émilien Voisin (France) Rayane Oumaouche (France) Maxime Mora (France) Adrien Gobat
January 23	Jakarta, Indonesia; Hard; M15; Singles and Doubles Draws	(Romania) Nicholas David Ionel; 4–6, 6–1, 7–6^{(11–9)}	(India) Sidharth Rawat	(Japan) Keisuke Saitoh; Marat Sharipov	(Indonesia) M Rifqi Fitriadi (Malaysia) Mitsuki Wei Kang Leong (Thailand) Wishaya Trongcharoenchaikul (Australia) Moerani Bouzige
January 23	Jakarta, Indonesia; Hard; M15; Singles and Doubles Draws	(India) Rithvik Choudary Bollipalli (India) Niki Kaliyanda Poonacha; 6–1, 6–3	(Japan) Keisuke Saitoh (Japan) Naoki Tajima	(Japan) Keisuke Saitoh; Marat Sharipov	(Indonesia) M Rifqi Fitriadi (Malaysia) Mitsuki Wei Kang Leong (Thailand) Wishaya Trongcharoenchaikul (Australia) Moerani Bouzige
January 23	Edmond, United States; Hard (i); M15; Singles and Doubles Draws	(United States) Alex Michelsen; 6–7^{(5–7)}, 7–6^{(7–4)}, 6–1	(Sweden) Lucas Renard	(Romania) Gabi Adrian Boitan (United States) Chad Kissell	(United States) Kyle Seelig (United States) Jacob Brumm (United States) Warren Wood (United States) Joshua Sheehy
January 23	Edmond, United States; Hard (i); M15; Singles and Doubles Draws	(United States) Mac Kiger (Canada) Benjamin Sigouin; 7–6^{(9–7)}, 6–4	(United States) Collin Altamirano (Romania) Gabi Adrian Boitan	(Romania) Gabi Adrian Boitan (United States) Chad Kissell	(United States) Kyle Seelig (United States) Jacob Brumm (United States) Warren Wood (United States) Joshua Sheehy
January 23	Cairo, Egypt; Clay; M15; Singles and Doubles Draws	(Sweden) Dragoș Nicolae Mădăraș; 1–6, 6–3, 6–1	(Spain) José Francisco Vidal Azorín	(Austria) Lukas Krainer (Paraguay) Daniel Vallejo	(Italy) Lorenzo Bocchi (Egypt) Amr Elsayed (Egypt) Mohamed Safwat (Algeria) Samir Hamza Reguig
January 23	Cairo, Egypt; Clay; M15; Singles and Doubles Draws	(Italy) Niccolò Catini (Italy) Gabriele Maria Noce; 4–6, 7–6^{(7–3)}, [10–5]	(Egypt) Amr Elsayed (Egypt) Karim-Mohamed Maamoun	(Austria) Lukas Krainer (Paraguay) Daniel Vallejo	(Italy) Lorenzo Bocchi (Egypt) Amr Elsayed (Egypt) Mohamed Safwat (Algeria) Samir Hamza Reguig
January 23	Antalya, Turkey; Clay; M15; Singles and Doubles Draws	(Argentina) Alex Barrena; 6–3, 6–2	(Hungary) Gergely Madarász	(Israel) Yshai Oliel (Spain) Carlos Gimeno Valero	(Italy) Manuel Plunger (Italy) Davide Galoppini (Germany) Marcel Zielinski (Ukraine) Eric Vanshelboim
January 23	Antalya, Turkey; Clay; M15; Singles and Doubles Draws	(Turkey) Cengiz Aksu (Turkey) Gökberk Sarıtaş; 7–6^{(7–3)}, 2–6, [11–9]	(Italy) Matteo De Vincentis (Italy) Davide Galoppini	(Israel) Yshai Oliel (Spain) Carlos Gimeno Valero	(Italy) Manuel Plunger (Italy) Davide Galoppini (Germany) Marcel Zielinski (Ukraine) Eric Vanshelboim
January 23	Monastir, Tunisia; Hard; M15; Singles and Doubles Draws	(Tunisia) Moez Echargui; 3–6, 6–3, 7–6^{(7–5)}	(North Macedonia) Kalin Ivanovski	(Greece) Stefanos Sakellaridis (Italy) Francesco Forti	(United States) Colin Markes (Austria) Sebastian Sorger (Tunisia) Aziz Ouakaa (Netherlands) Guy den Ouden
January 23	Monastir, Tunisia; Hard; M15; Singles and Doubles Draws	(United States) Colin Markes (United States) Andrew Rogers; 7–5, 6–3	(Portugal) Tiago Pereira (Portugal) Daniel Rodrigues	(Greece) Stefanos Sakellaridis (Italy) Francesco Forti	(United States) Colin Markes (Austria) Sebastian Sorger (Tunisia) Aziz Ouakaa (Netherlands) Guy den Ouden
January 30	Antalya, Turkey; Clay; M25; Singles and Doubles Draws	(Sweden) Dragoș Nicolae Mădăraș; 3–6, 6–4, 6–2	(Italy) Edoardo Lavagno	(Spain) Pol Martín Tiffon (France) Mathys Erhard	(Argentina) Valerio Aboian; Andrey Chepelev (Bolivia) Murkel Dellien (Argentina) Alex Barrena
January 30	Antalya, Turkey; Clay; M25; Singles and Doubles Draws	Andrey Chepelev (Moldova) Ilya Snițari; 6–1, 7–5	(Turkey) Cengiz Aksu (Turkey) S Mert Özdemir	(Spain) Pol Martín Tiffon (France) Mathys Erhard	(Argentina) Valerio Aboian; Andrey Chepelev (Bolivia) Murkel Dellien (Argentina) Alex Barrena
January 30	Monastir, Tunisia; Hard; M25; Singles and Doubles Draws	(Italy) Francesco Forti; 6–3, 6–4	(Italy) Federico Gaio	(China) Sun Fajing (France) Dan Added	(Netherlands) Jesper de Jong (France) Mathias Bourgue (Italy) Samuel Vincent Ruggeri (United States) Omni Kumar
January 30	Monastir, Tunisia; Hard; M25; Singles and Doubles Draws	(France) Dan Added (France) Luca Sanchez; 6–4, 7–6^{(7–5)}	(Italy) Enrico Dalla Valle (Italy) Francesco Forti	(China) Sun Fajing (France) Dan Added	(Netherlands) Jesper de Jong (France) Mathias Bourgue (Italy) Samuel Vincent Ruggeri (United States) Omni Kumar
January 30	Sharm El Sheikh, Egypt; Hard; M15; Singles and Doubles Draws	(Czech Republic) Jiří Barnat; 6–3, 7–6^{(9–7)}	(Serbia) Boris Butulija	(Italy) Leonardo Rossi (Australia) Jacob Bradshaw	(Italy) Daniele Capecchi (Italy) Marco Miceli (Germany) Karlo Cubelic (Algeria) Samir Hamza Reguig
January 30	Sharm El Sheikh, Egypt; Hard; M15; Singles and Doubles Draws	(India) S D Prajwal Dev (France) Nathan Seateun; 6–3, 6–7^{(8–10)}, [10–7]	Egor Agafonov; Vladislav Ivanov	(Italy) Leonardo Rossi (Australia) Jacob Bradshaw	(Italy) Daniele Capecchi (Italy) Marco Miceli (Germany) Karlo Cubelic (Algeria) Samir Hamza Reguig
January 30	Monastir, Tunisia; Hard; M15; Singles and Doubles Draws	(Italy) Federico Iannaccone; 3–6, 6–3, 6–2	(Greece) Stefanos Sakellaridis	(North Macedonia) Kalin Ivanovski (Italy) Luca Giacomini	(France) Arthur Bouquier (China) Mu Tao (Japan) Shohei Chikami (China) Zhou Yi
January 30	Monastir, Tunisia; Hard; M15; Singles and Doubles Draws	(France) Florent Bax (France) Arthur Bouquier; 7–5, 6–3	(Italy) Manuel Mazza (Italy) Andrea Picchione	(North Macedonia) Kalin Ivanovski (Italy) Luca Giacomini	(France) Arthur Bouquier (China) Mu Tao (Japan) Shohei Chikami (China) Zhou Yi

=== February ===
Week of	Tournament	Winner	Runners-up	Semifinalists	Quarterfinalists
February 6	Burnie, Australia; Hard; M25; Singles and Doubles Draws	(Japan) Yuta Shimizu; 6–4, 6–4	(Australia) Alex Bolt	(Japan) Naoki Nakagawa (France) Maxime Chazal	(Japan) Shinji Hazawa (Australia) Adam Walton (Australia) Thomas Fancutt (Australia) Tristan Schoolkate
February 6	Burnie, Australia; Hard; M25; Singles and Doubles Draws	(Australia) Luke Saville (Australia) Tristan Schoolkate; 7–5, 6–4	(Australia) Calum Puttergill (Australia) Adam Walton	(Japan) Naoki Nakagawa (France) Maxime Chazal	(Japan) Shinji Hazawa (Australia) Adam Walton (Australia) Thomas Fancutt (Australia) Tristan Schoolkate
February 6	Bath, United Kingdom; Hard (i); M25; Singles and Doubles Draws	(Germany) Henri Squire; 6–3, 6–3	(France) Jules Marie	(United Kingdom) Daniel Cox (United Kingdom) George Loffhagen	(United Kingdom) Daniel Little (France) Matteo Martineau (United Kingdom) Hamish Stewart (United States) Oliver Crawford
February 6	Bath, United Kingdom; Hard (i); M25; Singles and Doubles Draws	(United Kingdom) Scott Duncan (United Kingdom) Marcus Willis; 6–3, 6–4	(United Kingdom) Ben Jones (United Kingdom) Daniel Little	(United Kingdom) Daniel Cox (United Kingdom) George Loffhagen	(United Kingdom) Daniel Little (France) Matteo Martineau (United Kingdom) Hamish Stewart (United States) Oliver Crawford
February 6	Antalya, Turkey; Clay; M25; Singles and Doubles Draws				
February 6	Antalya, Turkey; Clay; M25; Singles and Doubles Draws	Tournament was cancelled due to 2023 Turkey–Syria earthquakes			
February 6	Vila Real de Santo António, Portugal; Hard; M25; Singles and Doubles Draws	(France) Valentin Royer; 7–5, 4–6, 6–3	(Italy) Gabriele Piraino	(Czech Republic) Michael Vrbenský (Czech Republic) Matěj Vocel	(Spain) Sergi Pérez Contri (Portugal) Duarte Vale (Germany) Sebastian Fanselow (Ukraine) Georgii Kravchenko
February 6	Vila Real de Santo António, Portugal; Hard; M25; Singles and Doubles Draws	(Belgium) Simon Beaupain (Argentina) Juan Bautista Otegui; 6–2, 4–6, [10–8]	(Italy) Jacopo Berrettini (Italy) Federico Gaio	(Czech Republic) Michael Vrbenský (Czech Republic) Matěj Vocel	(Spain) Sergi Pérez Contri (Portugal) Duarte Vale (Germany) Sebastian Fanselow (Ukraine) Georgii Kravchenko
February 6	Monastir, Tunisia; Hard; M25; Singles and Doubles Draws	(Switzerland) Jakub Paul; 6–3, 7–5	(Italy) Enrico Dalla Valle	(Lebanon) Hady Habib (Tunisia) Aziz Dougaz	(Tunisia) Skander Mansouri (France) Arthur Bouquier (France) Clément Tabur (Italy) Luca Castagnola
February 6	Monastir, Tunisia; Hard; M25; Singles and Doubles Draws	Erik Arutiunian; Daniil Ostapenkov; 6–1, 6–7^{(3–7)}, [10–6]	(Austria) Neil Oberleitner (Ukraine) Oleksandr Ovcharenko	(Lebanon) Hady Habib (Tunisia) Aziz Dougaz	(Tunisia) Skander Mansouri (France) Arthur Bouquier (France) Clément Tabur (Italy) Luca Castagnola
February 6	Grenoble, France; Hard (i); M15; Singles and Doubles Draws	(France) Tristan Lamasine; 6–3, 6–4	(France) Timo Legout	Nikolay Vylegzhanin (France) Antoine Ghibaudo	(France) Paul Cayre (Germany) Jakob Schnaitter; Kirill Kivattsev (Belgium) Tibo Colson
February 6	Grenoble, France; Hard (i); M15; Singles and Doubles Draws	(France) Gabriel Debru (France) Paul Inchauspé; 6–2, 6–3	(France) Maxence Beaugé (France) Émilien Voisin	Nikolay Vylegzhanin (France) Antoine Ghibaudo	(France) Paul Cayre (Germany) Jakob Schnaitter; Kirill Kivattsev (Belgium) Tibo Colson
February 6	Palm Coast, United States; Clay; M15; Singles and Doubles Draws	(Romania) Gabi Adrian Boitan; 6–2, 4–6, 6–1	(Argentina) Ignacio Monzón	(Peru) Gonzalo Bueno (United States) Mac Kiger	(Argentina) Francisco Comesaña (United States) Toby Kodat (United States) Bruno Kuzuhara (United States) Isaiah Strode
February 6	Palm Coast, United States; Clay; M15; Singles and Doubles Draws	(United States) George Goldhoff (United States) Mac Kiger; 6–3, 6–4	(Argentina) Francisco Comesaña (Argentina) Ignacio Monzón	(Peru) Gonzalo Bueno (United States) Mac Kiger	(Argentina) Francisco Comesaña (United States) Toby Kodat (United States) Bruno Kuzuhara (United States) Isaiah Strode
February 6	Sharm El Sheikh, Egypt; Hard; M15; Singles and Doubles Draws	(Poland) Martyn Pawelski; 6–3, 6–4	Boris Pokotilov	(Italy) Leonardo Rossi (Netherlands) Guy den Ouden	(Italy) Luca Fantini (South Korea) Jeong Yeong-seok (Hungary) Péter Fajta (Italy) Daniele Capecchi
February 6	Sharm El Sheikh, Egypt; Hard; M15; Singles and Doubles Draws	(Czech Republic) Jiří Barnat (Czech Republic) Filip Duda; 6–4, 7–5	(Poland) Szymon Kielan (Ukraine) Volodymyr Uzhylovskyi	(Italy) Leonardo Rossi (Netherlands) Guy den Ouden	(Italy) Luca Fantini (South Korea) Jeong Yeong-seok (Hungary) Péter Fajta (Italy) Daniele Capecchi
February 6	Monastir, Tunisia; Hard; M15; Singles and Doubles Draws	(Netherlands) Ryan Nijboer; 6–2, 3–0 ret.	(North Macedonia) Kalin Ivanovski	(Poland) Olaf Pieczkowski (Italy) Fabrizio Andaloro	(France) Nicolas Tepmahc (Germany) Tim Handel (China) Mu Tao (Italy) Federico Iannaccone
February 6	Monastir, Tunisia; Hard; M15; Singles and Doubles Draws	(Greece) Stefanos Sakellaridis (South Africa) Kris van Wyk; Walkover	(Italy) Fabrizio Andaloro (Uruguay) Franco Roncadelli	(Poland) Olaf Pieczkowski (Italy) Fabrizio Andaloro	(France) Nicolas Tepmahc (Germany) Tim Handel (China) Mu Tao (Italy) Federico Iannaccone
February 13	Vila Real de Santo António, Portugal; Hard; M25; Singles and Doubles Draws	(Portugal) Henrique Rocha; 6–3, 6–1	(Italy) Federico Gaio	(Czech Republic) Michael Vrbenský (Spain) Pablo Llamas Ruiz	(Portugal) Gonçalo Oliveira (United Kingdom) Billy Harris (Denmark) Christian Sigsgaard (Monaco) Valentin Vacherot
February 13	Vila Real de Santo António, Portugal; Hard; M25; Singles and Doubles Draws	(Czech Republic) Matěj Vocel (Czech Republic) Michael Vrbenský; 6–4, 6–2	(Denmark) August Holmgren (Denmark) Christian Sigsgaard	(Czech Republic) Michael Vrbenský (Spain) Pablo Llamas Ruiz	(Portugal) Gonçalo Oliveira (United Kingdom) Billy Harris (Denmark) Christian Sigsgaard (Monaco) Valentin Vacherot
February 13	Santo Domingo, Dominican Republic; Hard; M25; Singles and Doubles Draws	(Brazil) Daniel Dutra da Silva; 7–6^{(7–4)}, 7–5	(United States) Kyle Seelig	(France) Jaimee Floyd Angele (Australia) Adam Walton	(Peru) Jorge Panta (Portugal) Daniel Rodrigues (United States) Aidan Mayo (Argentina) Gonzalo Villanueva
February 13	Santo Domingo, Dominican Republic; Hard; M25; Singles and Doubles Draws	(Peru) Arklon Huertas del Pino (Peru) Conner Huertas del Pino; 6–3, 6–2	(Spain) Miguel Damas (Spain) Bruno Pujol Navarro	(France) Jaimee Floyd Angele (Australia) Adam Walton	(Peru) Jorge Panta (Portugal) Daniel Rodrigues (United States) Aidan Mayo (Argentina) Gonzalo Villanueva
February 13	Monastir, Tunisia; Hard; M25; Singles and Doubles Draws	(United States) Oliver Crawford; 2–6, 6–4, 6–1	(Tunisia) Moez Echargui	(France) Robin Bertrand (France) Clément Tabur	Bogdan Bobrov (Tunisia) Aziz Ouakaa (France) Arthur Bouquier (France) Ugo Blanchet
February 13	Monastir, Tunisia; Hard; M25; Singles and Doubles Draws	(Italy) Luca Potenza (Italy) Samuel Vincent Ruggeri; 6–3, 6–3	(Peru) Alexander Merino (Switzerland) Jakub Paul	(France) Robin Bertrand (France) Clément Tabur	Bogdan Bobrov (Tunisia) Aziz Ouakaa (France) Arthur Bouquier (France) Ugo Blanchet
February 13	Oberhaching, Germany; Hard (i); M15; Singles and Doubles Draws	(Germany) Daniel Masur; 7–6^{(7–4)}, 7–6^{(7–3)}	(Germany) Rudolf Molleker	(Germany) Mats Rosenkranz (France) Sascha Gueymard Wayenburg	(Germany) Robert Strombachs (Netherlands) Mick Veldheer (Germany) Jakob Schnaitter (Germany) Luca Wiedenmann
February 13	Oberhaching, Germany; Hard (i); M15; Singles and Doubles Draws	(United Kingdom) Joshua Goodger (United Kingdom) Joe Tyler; 7–6^{(7–4)}, 1–6, [10–7]	(Germany) Johannes Härteis (Germany) Jakob Schnaitter	(Germany) Mats Rosenkranz (France) Sascha Gueymard Wayenburg	(Germany) Robert Strombachs (Netherlands) Mick Veldheer (Germany) Jakob Schnaitter (Germany) Luca Wiedenmann
February 13	Weston, United States; Clay; M15; Singles and Doubles Draws	(Romania) Gabi Adrian Boitan; 6–3, 6–4	(United States) Christian Langmo	(United States) Aidan Kim (Argentina) Federico Agustín Gómez	(Argentina) Francisco Comesaña (United States) Bruno Kuzuhara (Peru) Ignacio Buse (Estonia) Kristjan Tamm
February 13	Weston, United States; Clay; M15; Singles and Doubles Draws	(United States) Vasil Kirkov (United States) Bruno Kuzuhara; 6–2, 6–3	(Czech Republic) Jiří Jeníček (Czech Republic) Daniel Pátý	(United States) Aidan Kim (Argentina) Federico Agustín Gómez	(Argentina) Francisco Comesaña (United States) Bruno Kuzuhara (Peru) Ignacio Buse (Estonia) Kristjan Tamm
February 13	Sharm El Sheikh, Egypt; Hard; M15; Singles and Doubles Draws	(Hungary) Péter Fajta; 6–3, 6–2	(Poland) Szymon Kielan	(Georgia (country)) Saba Purtseladze (Italy) Simone Roncalli	(United States) Joshua Sheehy (Denmark) Elmer Møller (Denmark) Johannes Ingildsen (India) S D Prajwal Dev
February 13	Sharm El Sheikh, Egypt; Hard; M15; Singles and Doubles Draws	(India) S D Prajwal Dev (India) Sai Karteek Reddy Ganta; 5–7, 7–6^{(7–5)}, [10–8]	(Slovenia) Jan Kupčič (Slovenia) Maj Premzl	(Georgia (country)) Saba Purtseladze (Italy) Simone Roncalli	(United States) Joshua Sheehy (Denmark) Elmer Møller (Denmark) Johannes Ingildsen (India) S D Prajwal Dev
February 13	Monastir, Tunisia; Hard; M15; Singles and Doubles Draws	(Italy) Lorenzo Rottoli; 2–6, 6–4, 6–4	(Monaco) Lucas Catarina	(Poland) Filip Peliwo (Romania) Cezar Crețu	(France) Nicolas Tepmahc (Japan) Taiyo Yamanaka (South Africa) Kris van Wyk (Poland) Maks Kaśnikowski
February 13	Monastir, Tunisia; Hard; M15; Singles and Doubles Draws	(Germany) Tim Handel (Switzerland) Yannik Steinegger; 6–4, 6–1	(Japan) Ryuki Matsuda (Japan) Naoki Tajima	(Poland) Filip Peliwo (Romania) Cezar Crețu	(France) Nicolas Tepmahc (Japan) Taiyo Yamanaka (South Africa) Kris van Wyk (Poland) Maks Kaśnikowski
February 20	Swan Hill, Australia; Grass; M25; Singles and Doubles Draws	(Australia) Tristan Schoolkate; 4–6, 6–4, 6–3	(Australia) Philip Sekulic	(New Zealand) Ajeet Rai (Australia) Thomas Fancutt	(Australia) Matthew Dellavedova (New Zealand) Alexander Klintcharov (Australia) Luke Saville (Australia) Blake Ellis
February 20	Swan Hill, Australia; Grass; M25; Singles and Doubles Draws	(Australia) Luke Saville (Australia) Tristan Schoolkate; 6–3, 7–6^{(7–3)}	(Australia) Blake Bayldon (Australia) Edward Winter	(New Zealand) Ajeet Rai (Australia) Thomas Fancutt	(Australia) Matthew Dellavedova (New Zealand) Alexander Klintcharov (Australia) Luke Saville (Australia) Blake Ellis
February 20	Faro, Portugal; Hard; M25; Singles and Doubles Draws	(France) Lucas Poullain; 7–6^{(7–5)}, 6–2	(France) Timo Legout	(United States) Martin Damm (Czech Republic) Michael Vrbenský	(Portugal) Henrique Rocha (France) François Musitelli (Denmark) August Holmgren (Spain) Imanol López Morillo
February 20	Faro, Portugal; Hard; M25; Singles and Doubles Draws	(France) Antoine Hoang (France) Grégoire Jacq; 6–0, 6–1	(France) Lucas Poullain (France) Clément Tabur	(United States) Martin Damm (Czech Republic) Michael Vrbenský	(Portugal) Henrique Rocha (France) François Musitelli (Denmark) August Holmgren (Spain) Imanol López Morillo
February 20	Santo Domingo, Dominican Republic; Hard; M25; Singles and Doubles Draws	(Australia) Alex Bolt; 4–6, 6–1, 7–6^{(7–5)}	(Australia) Adam Walton	(The Bahamas) Justin Roberts (United States) Kyle Seelig	(Dominican Republic) Nick Hardt (Dominican Republic) Roberto Cid Subervi (Argentina) Gonzalo Villanueva (Brazil) Daniel Dutra da Silva
February 20	Santo Domingo, Dominican Republic; Hard; M25; Singles and Doubles Draws	(Peru) Arklon Huertas del Pino (Peru) Conner Huertas del Pino; 6–4, 6–3	(United States) Ezekiel Clark (Australia) Adam Walton	(The Bahamas) Justin Roberts (United States) Kyle Seelig	(Dominican Republic) Nick Hardt (Dominican Republic) Roberto Cid Subervi (Argentina) Gonzalo Villanueva (Brazil) Daniel Dutra da Silva
February 20	Monastir, Tunisia; Hard; M25; Singles and Doubles Draws	(Italy) Fausto Tabacco; 6–2, 6–3	(Tunisia) Moez Echargui	(Spain) Oriol Roca Batalla (Spain) Mario González Fernández	(Morocco) Elliot Benchetrit (Germany) Mischa Zverev (Lebanon) Hady Habib (Estonia) Mark Lajal
February 20	Monastir, Tunisia; Hard; M25; Singles and Doubles Draws	(Italy) Fausto Tabacco (Italy) Giorgio Tabacco; 6–3, 6–4	(China) Cui Jie (Chinese Taipei) Huang Tsung-hao	(Spain) Oriol Roca Batalla (Spain) Mario González Fernández	(Morocco) Elliot Benchetrit (Germany) Mischa Zverev (Lebanon) Hady Habib (Estonia) Mark Lajal
February 20	Tucumán, Argentina; Clay; M15; Singles and Doubles Draws	(Argentina) Genaro Alberto Olivieri; 3–6, 6–4, 6–4	(Argentina) Franco Emanuel Egea	(Uruguay) Martín Cuevas (Brazil) Pedro Boscardin Dias	(Argentina) Gabriel Alejandro Hidalgo (Argentina) Lautaro Midón (Argentina) Valerio Aboian (Argentina) Lorenzo Joaquín Rodríguez
February 20	Tucumán, Argentina; Clay; M15; Singles and Doubles Draws	(Brazil) Paulo André Saraiva dos Santos (Brazil) Fernando Yamacita; 6–4, 6–4	(Argentina) Franco Emanuel Egea (Argentina) Gabriel Alejandro Hidalgo	(Uruguay) Martín Cuevas (Brazil) Pedro Boscardin Dias	(Argentina) Gabriel Alejandro Hidalgo (Argentina) Lautaro Midón (Argentina) Valerio Aboian (Argentina) Lorenzo Joaquín Rodríguez
February 20	Naples, United States; Clay; M15; Singles and Doubles Draws	(Romania) Gabi Adrian Boitan; 6–3, 6–1	(United States) Kyle Kang	(United States) Bruno Kuzuhara (United States) Victor Lilov	(Japan) Rei Sakamoto (United States) Ozan Baris (Sweden) Lucas Renard (Argentina) Federico Agustín Gómez
February 20	Naples, United States; Clay; M15; Singles and Doubles Draws	(Czech Republic) Jiří Jeníček (Czech Republic) Daniel Pátý; 7–6^{(7–2)}, 6–4	(Ukraine) Viacheslav Bielinskyi (Ecuador) Álvaro Guillén Meza	(United States) Bruno Kuzuhara (United States) Victor Lilov	(Japan) Rei Sakamoto (United States) Ozan Baris (Sweden) Lucas Renard (Argentina) Federico Agustín Gómez
February 20	Sharm El Sheikh, Egypt; Hard; M15; Singles and Doubles Draws	Marat Sharipov; 3–6, 6–2, 6–3	(Germany) Robert Strombachs	(Uzbekistan) Sergey Fomin (Italy) Andrea Guerrieri	(Austria) Lukas Krainer (Bosnia and Herzegovina) Aldin Šetkić (Netherlands) Roland Stuurman (Egypt) Mohamed Safwat
February 20	Sharm El Sheikh, Egypt; Hard; M15; Singles and Doubles Draws	(Denmark) Johannes Ingildsen (Denmark) Elmer Møller; 6–3, 6–2	(Egypt) Akram El Sallaly (Egypt) Mohamed Safwat	(Uzbekistan) Sergey Fomin (Italy) Andrea Guerrieri	(Austria) Lukas Krainer (Bosnia and Herzegovina) Aldin Šetkić (Netherlands) Roland Stuurman (Egypt) Mohamed Safwat
February 20	Antalya, Turkey; Clay; M15; Singles and Doubles Draws	(Spain) Àlex Martí Pujolràs; 6–2, 6–3	(Switzerland) Damien Wenger	(Romania) Nicholas David Ionel; Denis Klok	Andrey Chepelev (Spain) Max Alcalá Gurri (Ukraine) Eric Vanshelboim (Brazil) Nicolas Zanellato
February 20	Antalya, Turkey; Clay; M15; Singles and Doubles Draws	(Spain) Max Alcalá Gurri (Spain) Àlex Martí Pujolràs; 6–4, 6–4	(Turkey) Tuna Altuna (France) Arthur Reymond	(Romania) Nicholas David Ionel; Denis Klok	Andrey Chepelev (Spain) Max Alcalá Gurri (Ukraine) Eric Vanshelboim (Brazil) Nicolas Zanellato
February 20	Monastir, Tunisia; Hard; M15; Singles and Doubles Draws	(Poland) Maks Kaśnikowski; 6–4, 6–0	(Monaco) Lucas Catarina	(France) Gabriel Debru (Italy) Andrea Picchione	(Italy) Federico Iannaccone (China) Mu Tao (Japan) Kokoro Isomura (Uruguay) Franco Roncadelli
February 20	Monastir, Tunisia; Hard; M15; Singles and Doubles Draws	(Chinese Taipei) Ray Ho (Germany) Christoph Negritu; 6–2, 6–2	(Japan) Kokoro Isomura (Japan) Ryuki Matsuda	(France) Gabriel Debru (Italy) Andrea Picchione	(Italy) Federico Iannaccone (China) Mu Tao (Japan) Kokoro Isomura (Uruguay) Franco Roncadelli
February 27	Torelló, Spain; Hard; M25; Singles and Doubles Draws	(Spain) John Echeverría; 5–7, 6–1, 7–6^{(7–5)}	(Spain) Oriol Roca Batalla	(Canada) Steven Diez (France) Maxime Chazal	(Spain) Daniel Mérida (Lithuania) Edas Butvilas (United Kingdom) Charles Broom (Spain) Nikolás Sánchez Izquierdo
February 27	Torelló, Spain; Hard; M25; Singles and Doubles Draws	(Spain) Íñigo Cervantes (Spain) Oriol Roca Batalla; 7–5, 6–4	(Spain) John Echeverría (Spain) Alejandro Moro Cañas	(Canada) Steven Diez (France) Maxime Chazal	(Spain) Daniel Mérida (Lithuania) Edas Butvilas (United Kingdom) Charles Broom (Spain) Nikolás Sánchez Izquierdo
February 27	Loulé, Portugal; Hard; M25; Singles and Doubles Draws	(Portugal) Gonçalo Oliveira; 6–3, 6–2	(France) Lucas Poullain	(Netherlands) Jesper de Jong (Italy) Giovanni Fonio	(Belgium) Michael Geerts (France) Clément Chidekh (Spain) Adrià Soriano Barrera (Czech Republic) Lukáš Rosol
February 27	Loulé, Portugal; Hard; M25; Singles and Doubles Draws	(Netherlands) Sidané Pontjodikromo (Netherlands) Niels Visker; 4–6, 6–2, [10–8]	(Netherlands) Jesper de Jong (United Kingdom) Aidan McHugh	(Netherlands) Jesper de Jong (Italy) Giovanni Fonio	(Belgium) Michael Geerts (France) Clément Chidekh (Spain) Adrià Soriano Barrera (Czech Republic) Lukáš Rosol
February 27	Tucumán, Argentina; Clay; M25; Singles and Doubles Draws	(Argentina) Francisco Comesaña; 7–5, 6–7^{(6–8)}, 6–3	(Argentina) Santiago Rodríguez Taverna	(Argentina) Thiago Agustín Tirante (Argentina) Lautaro Midón	(France) Térence Atmane (Spain) Pol Martín Tiffon (Argentina) Juan Bautista Torres (Brazil) Eduardo Ribeiro
February 27	Tucumán, Argentina; Clay; M25; Singles and Doubles Draws	(Argentina) Valerio Aboian (Bolivia) Murkel Dellien; 6–7^{(5–7)}, 7–5, [10–7]	(Argentina) Franco Emanuel Egea (Argentina) Gabriel Alejandro Hidalgo	(Argentina) Thiago Agustín Tirante (Argentina) Lautaro Midón	(France) Térence Atmane (Spain) Pol Martín Tiffon (Argentina) Juan Bautista Torres (Brazil) Eduardo Ribeiro
February 27	Swan Hill, Australia; Grass; M25; Singles and Doubles Draws	(Australia) Thomas Fancutt; 6–4, 6–7^{(3–7)}, 7–5	(Australia) Luke Saville	(Australia) Omar Jasika (Australia) Tristan Schoolkate	(Australia) Edward Winter (Australia) Matthew Dellavedova (New Zealand) Ajeet Rai (Australia) Blake Ellis
February 27	Swan Hill, Australia; Grass; M25; Singles and Doubles Draws	(Australia) Luke Saville (Australia) Tristan Schoolkate; 6–3, 6–4	(Australia) Blake Ellis (Australia) Matthew Romios	(Australia) Omar Jasika (Australia) Tristan Schoolkate	(Australia) Edward Winter (Australia) Matthew Dellavedova (New Zealand) Ajeet Rai (Australia) Blake Ellis
February 27	Aktobe, Kazakhstan; Hard (i); M15; Singles and Doubles Draws	(Spain) David Pérez Sanz; 6–3, 0–6, 6–2	Evgeny Philippov	Yan Bondarevskiy; Petr Bar Biryukov	(Kazakhstan) Arslanbek Aitkulov (Japan) Yusuke Takahashi (Japan) Kazuma Kawachi (Italy) Federico Bertuccioli
February 27	Aktobe, Kazakhstan; Hard (i); M15; Singles and Doubles Draws	Aliaksandr Liaonenka; Alexander Zgirovsky; 6–4, 6–3	Nikita Ianin; Evgeny Philippov	Yan Bondarevskiy; Petr Bar Biryukov	(Kazakhstan) Arslanbek Aitkulov (Japan) Yusuke Takahashi (Japan) Kazuma Kawachi (Italy) Federico Bertuccioli
February 27	Naples, United States; Clay; M15; Singles and Doubles Draws	(Argentina) Federico Agustín Gómez; 6–4, 6–0	(Argentina) Matías Franco Descotte	(Peru) Gonzalo Bueno (United States) Tristan McCormick	(Ukraine) Viacheslav Bielinskyi (United States) Isaiah Strode (Argentina) Ignacio Monzón (Czech Republic) Daniel Pátý
February 27	Naples, United States; Clay; M15; Singles and Doubles Draws	(Argentina) Federico Agustín Gómez (Argentina) Ignacio Monzón; 6–3, 6–2	(Peru) Gonzalo Bueno (Ecuador) Álvaro Guillén Meza	(Peru) Gonzalo Bueno (United States) Tristan McCormick	(Ukraine) Viacheslav Bielinskyi (United States) Isaiah Strode (Argentina) Ignacio Monzón (Czech Republic) Daniel Pátý
February 27	Sharm El Sheikh, Egypt; Hard; M15; Singles and Doubles Draws	(Georgia (country)) Saba Purtseladze; 6–3, 6–4	(Belgium) Alexander Blockx	Marat Sharipov (South Korea) Lee Duck-hee	(Egypt) Mohamed Safwat (Germany) Sebastian Prechtel (South Africa) Kris van Wyk (Germany) Robert Strombachs
February 27	Sharm El Sheikh, Egypt; Hard; M15; Singles and Doubles Draws	(Slovakia) Lukáš Pokorný (Georgia (country)) Saba Purtseladze; 6–3, 6–4	(Luxembourg) Alex Knaff (Germany) Jakob Schnaitter	Marat Sharipov (South Korea) Lee Duck-hee	(Egypt) Mohamed Safwat (Germany) Sebastian Prechtel (South Africa) Kris van Wyk (Germany) Robert Strombachs
February 27	Antalya, Turkey; Clay; M15; Singles and Doubles Draws	(Italy) Edoardo Lavagno; 6–4, 3–6, 7–6^{(7–5)}	(France) Arthur Reymond	(Ukraine) Eric Vanshelboim (Italy) Alexander Weis	(Montenegro) Rrezart Cungu (Bulgaria) Gabriel Donev; Denis Klok (Czech Republic) Dominik Kellovský
February 27	Antalya, Turkey; Clay; M15; Singles and Doubles Draws	(Italy) Matteo De Vincentis (France) Arthur Reymond; 7–6^{(7–5)}, 6–4	(Brazil) Igor Gimenez (Paraguay) Daniel Vallejo	(Ukraine) Eric Vanshelboim (Italy) Alexander Weis	(Montenegro) Rrezart Cungu (Bulgaria) Gabriel Donev; Denis Klok (Czech Republic) Dominik Kellovský
February 27	Monastir, Tunisia; Hard; M15; Singles and Doubles Draws	(Tunisia) Moez Echargui; 6–0, 7–6^{(7–3)}	(France) Adrien Gobat	(Japan) Renta Tokuda (Japan) Ryuki Matsuda	(Germany) Marvin Möller (Germany) Christoph Negritu (Japan) Hikaru Shiraishi (Italy) Leonardo Rossi
February 27	Monastir, Tunisia; Hard; M15; Singles and Doubles Draws	(Bulgaria) Alexander Donski (Chinese Taipei) Ray Ho; 7–5, 6–3	Bogdan Bobrov (Germany) Christoph Negritu	(Japan) Renta Tokuda (Japan) Ryuki Matsuda	(Germany) Marvin Möller (Germany) Christoph Negritu (Japan) Hikaru Shiraishi (Italy) Leonardo Rossi

=== March ===
Week of	Tournament	Winner	Runners-up	Semifinalists	Quarterfinalists
March 6	Quinta do Lago, Portugal; Hard; M25; Singles and Doubles Draws	(Netherlands) Jesper de Jong; 6–1, 5–7, 6–4	(Japan) Naoki Nakagawa	(Ivory Coast) Eliakim Coulibaly (Portugal) Henrique Rocha	(France) Kyrian Jacquet (United Kingdom) Aidan McHugh (Poland) Filip Peliwo (Chile) Diego Fernández Flores
March 6	Quinta do Lago, Portugal; Hard; M25; Singles and Doubles Draws	(Netherlands) Mats Hermans (Netherlands) Mick Veldheer; 6–4, 6–3	(Chile) Diego Fernández Flores (Spain) Adrià Soriano Barrera	(Ivory Coast) Eliakim Coulibaly (Portugal) Henrique Rocha	(France) Kyrian Jacquet (United Kingdom) Aidan McHugh (Poland) Filip Peliwo (Chile) Diego Fernández Flores
March 6	Río Cuarto, Argentina; Clay; M25; Singles and Doubles Draws	(Spain) Pol Martín Tiffon; 7–6^{(9–7)}, 3–6, 7–5	(Bolivia) Murkel Dellien	(Argentina) Francisco Comesaña (Brazil) Fernando Yamacita	(Argentina) Santiago Rodríguez Taverna (Italy) Facundo Juárez (Argentina) Juan Ignacio Galarza (France) Émilien Voisin
March 6	Río Cuarto, Argentina; Clay; M25; Singles and Doubles Draws	(Argentina) Franco Emanuel Egea (Argentina) Gabriel Alejandro Hidalgo; 6–4, 6–2	(Argentina) Luciano Emanuel Ambrogi (Argentina) Alejo Lorenzo Lingua Lavallén	(Argentina) Francisco Comesaña (Brazil) Fernando Yamacita	(Argentina) Santiago Rodríguez Taverna (Italy) Facundo Juárez (Argentina) Juan Ignacio Galarza (France) Émilien Voisin
March 6	Montreal, Canada; Hard (i); M25; Singles and Doubles Draws	(France) Jules Marie; 7–5, 6–0	(United States) Strong Kirchheimer	(Germany) Henri Squire (United Kingdom) Ben Jones	(United States) Alfredo Perez (Canada) Juan Carlos Aguilar (Austria) Sandro Kopp (Canada) Benjamin Sigouin
March 6	Montreal, Canada; Hard (i); M25; Singles and Doubles Draws	(Canada) Juan Carlos Aguilar (United Kingdom) Joe Tyler; 6–4, 5–7, [11–9]	(United Kingdom) Scott Duncan (United Kingdom) Marcus Willis	(Germany) Henri Squire (United Kingdom) Ben Jones	(United States) Alfredo Perez (Canada) Juan Carlos Aguilar (Austria) Sandro Kopp (Canada) Benjamin Sigouin
March 6	Aktobe, Kazakhstan; Hard (i); M15; Singles and Doubles Draws	Evgeny Philippov; 6–4, 4–6, 6–3	Alexandr Binda	Aliaksandr Liaonenka (Spain) David Pérez Sanz	(Japan) Kazuki Nishiwaki; Aleksandr Lobanov (Kazakhstan) Arslanbek Aitkulov (Ukraine) Aleksandr Braynin
March 6	Aktobe, Kazakhstan; Hard (i); M15; Singles and Doubles Draws	(Georgia (country)) Aleksandre Bakshi; Ivan Denisov; 6–3, 6–7^{(5–7)}, [10–7]	(Italy) Federico Bertuccioli (San Marino) Marco De Rossi	Aliaksandr Liaonenka (Spain) David Pérez Sanz	(Japan) Kazuki Nishiwaki; Aleksandr Lobanov (Kazakhstan) Arslanbek Aitkulov (Ukraine) Aleksandr Braynin
March 6	Kish Island, Iran; Clay; M15; Singles and Doubles Draws	(Romania) Dan Alexandru Tomescu; 7–6^{(8–6)}, 6–4	(Syria) Hazem Naw	(Hungary) Gergely Madarász (France) Maxence Brovillé	(Italy) Leonardo Catani (Hungary) Mátyás Füle; Egor Agafonov (India) Ishaque Eqbal
March 6	Kish Island, Iran; Clay; M15; Singles and Doubles Draws	(Hungary) Mátyás Füle (Hungary) Gergely Madarász; 6–3, 6–3	Egor Agafonov; Vladislav Ivanov	(Hungary) Gergely Madarász (France) Maxence Brovillé	(Italy) Leonardo Catani (Hungary) Mátyás Füle; Egor Agafonov (India) Ishaque Eqbal
March 6	Créteil, France; Hard (i); M15; Singles and Doubles Draws	(Germany) Marvin Möller; 6–2, 6–0	(France) Tristan Lamasine	(Monaco) Lucas Catarina (Italy) Andrea Guerrieri	(North Macedonia) Kalin Ivanovski (France) Antoine Ghibaudo (France) Arthur Bouquier (France) Constantin Bittoun Kouzmine
March 6	Créteil, France; Hard (i); M15; Singles and Doubles Draws	(France) Sascha Gueymard Wayenburg (France) Antoine Hoang; 7–5, 5–7, [10–5]	(France) Arthur Bouquier (France) Mathieu Scaglia	(Monaco) Lucas Catarina (Italy) Andrea Guerrieri	(North Macedonia) Kalin Ivanovski (France) Antoine Ghibaudo (France) Arthur Bouquier (France) Constantin Bittoun Kouzmine
March 6	Poreč, Croatia; Clay; M15; Singles and Doubles Draws	(Croatia) Dino Prižmić; 6–3, 6–2	(Switzerland) Mirko Martinez	(Italy) Daniele Capecchi (Italy) Riccardo Balzerani	(Germany) Sebastian Prechtel (Italy) Luca Castagnola (Italy) Tommaso Compagnucci (Switzerland) Damien Wenger
March 6	Poreč, Croatia; Clay; M15; Singles and Doubles Draws	(Croatia) Luka Mikrut (Italy) Gabriele Piraino; 6–4, 3–6, [10–7]	(Slovenia) Jan Kupčič (Slovenia) Maj Premzl	(Italy) Daniele Capecchi (Italy) Riccardo Balzerani	(Germany) Sebastian Prechtel (Italy) Luca Castagnola (Italy) Tommaso Compagnucci (Switzerland) Damien Wenger
March 6	Antalya, Turkey; Clay; M15; Singles and Doubles Draws	(Bulgaria) Yanaki Milev; 4–6, 6–2, 6–2	(France) Sean Cuenin	(Spain) Jorge Martínez Martínez (Montenegro) Rrezart Cungu	(Brazil) Nicolas Zanellato (France) Arthur Reymond (France) Arthur Géa (Romania) Ștefan Paloși
March 6	Antalya, Turkey; Clay; M15; Singles and Doubles Draws	(Spain) Jorge Martínez Martínez (Romania) Ștefan Paloși; 6–3, 7–5	(Italy) Matteo De Vincentis (Brazil) Igor Gimenez	(Spain) Jorge Martínez Martínez (Montenegro) Rrezart Cungu	(Brazil) Nicolas Zanellato (France) Arthur Reymond (France) Arthur Géa (Romania) Ștefan Paloși
March 6	Sharm El Sheikh, Egypt; Hard; M15; Singles and Doubles Draws	(Germany) Robert Strombachs; 6–2, 6–3	(Egypt) Mohamed Safwat	(Italy) Samuel Vincent Ruggeri (Slovakia) Lukáš Pokorný	(Sweden) Leo Borg (Georgia (country)) Saba Purtseladze (Luxembourg) Alex Knaff (Poland) Martyn Pawelski
March 6	Sharm El Sheikh, Egypt; Hard; M15; Singles and Doubles Draws	(Italy) Federico Bondioli (Italy) Gabriele Bosio; 7–5, 3–6, [10–7]	(Germany) Jakob Schnaitter (Germany) Luca Wiedenmann	(Italy) Samuel Vincent Ruggeri (Slovakia) Lukáš Pokorný	(Sweden) Leo Borg (Georgia (country)) Saba Purtseladze (Luxembourg) Alex Knaff (Poland) Martyn Pawelski
March 6	Monastir, Tunisia; Hard; M15; Singles and Doubles Draws	(France) Florent Bax; 6–2, 6–4	(China) Mu Tao	(Italy) Stefano Napolitano (Italy) Lorenzo Carboni	(Lebanon) Hady Habib (Japan) Hikaru Shiraishi (Chinese Taipei) Ray Ho (Italy) Luca Potenza
March 6	Monastir, Tunisia; Hard; M15; Singles and Doubles Draws	(China) Gao Xin (China) Wang Aoran; 6–2, 6–4	(Greece) Dimitris Sakellaridis (Greece) Stefanos Sakellaridis	(Italy) Stefano Napolitano (Italy) Lorenzo Carboni	(Lebanon) Hady Habib (Japan) Hikaru Shiraishi (Chinese Taipei) Ray Ho (Italy) Luca Potenza
March 13	Canberra, Australia; Clay; M25; Singles and Doubles Draws	(Australia) Marc Polmans; 6–0, 4–6, 6–4	(Japan) Tatsuma Ito	(Japan) Yuki Mochizuki (New Zealand) Ajeet Rai	(Australia) Dane Sweeny (Northern Mariana Islands) Colin Sinclair (Australia) Matthew Dellavedova (Australia) Dayne Kelly
March 13	Canberra, Australia; Clay; M25; Singles and Doubles Draws	(Northern Mariana Islands) Colin Sinclair (Australia) Zaharije-Zak Talic; 7–5, 6–3	(Australia) Blake Bayldon (Australia) Jordan Smith	(Japan) Yuki Mochizuki (New Zealand) Ajeet Rai	(Australia) Dane Sweeny (Northern Mariana Islands) Colin Sinclair (Australia) Matthew Dellavedova (Australia) Dayne Kelly
March 13	New Delhi, India; Hard; M25; Singles and Doubles Draws	Evgeny Donskoy; 6–1, 6–3	(Japan) Yusuke Takahashi	(South Korea) Jang Yun-seok (India) Niki Kaliyanda Poonacha	(Ukraine) Eric Vanshelboim (India) Siddharth Vishwakarma (Ukraine) Vladyslav Orlov (Australia) Jacob Bradshaw
March 13	New Delhi, India; Hard; M25; Singles and Doubles Draws	(Philippines) Francis Alcantara (Thailand) Pruchya Isaro; 6–2, 6–4	(India) Parikshit Somani (India) Manish Sureshkumar	(South Korea) Jang Yun-seok (India) Niki Kaliyanda Poonacha	(Ukraine) Eric Vanshelboim (India) Siddharth Vishwakarma (Ukraine) Vladyslav Orlov (Australia) Jacob Bradshaw
March 13	Portimão, Portugal; Hard; M25; Singles and Doubles Draws	(Portugal) Gonçalo Oliveira; 7–6^{(7–2)}, 6–4	(Australia) Akira Santillan	(United Kingdom) Aidan McHugh (Spain) Adrià Soriano Barrera	(Czech Republic) Lukáš Rosol (Portugal) Fábio Coelho (Ukraine) Georgii Kravchenko (Denmark) August Holmgren
March 13	Portimão, Portugal; Hard; M25; Singles and Doubles Draws	(Portugal) Gonçalo Oliveira (Australia) Jason Taylor; 6–2, 6–2	(United Kingdom) Billy Harris (Australia) Akira Santillan	(United Kingdom) Aidan McHugh (Spain) Adrià Soriano Barrera	(Czech Republic) Lukáš Rosol (Portugal) Fábio Coelho (Ukraine) Georgii Kravchenko (Denmark) August Holmgren
March 13	Palmanova, Spain; Clay; M25; Singles and Doubles Draws	(Spain) Pablo Llamas Ruiz; 6–3, 6–2	(Germany) Rudolf Molleker	(France) Kyrian Jacquet (Spain) Àlex Martí Pujolràs	(Spain) Javier Barranco Cosano (France) Maxime Chazal (Spain) Alejandro Melero Kretzer (Spain) Miguel Damas
March 13	Palmanova, Spain; Clay; M25; Singles and Doubles Draws	(Italy) Stefano Travaglia (Italy) Alexander Weis; 7–5, 6–3	(Netherlands) Thiemo de Bakker (Netherlands) Mats Hermans	(France) Kyrian Jacquet (Spain) Àlex Martí Pujolràs	(Spain) Javier Barranco Cosano (France) Maxime Chazal (Spain) Alejandro Melero Kretzer (Spain) Miguel Damas
March 13	Trimbach, Switzerland; Carpet (i); M25; Singles and Doubles Draws	(Poland) Kacper Żuk; 6–4, 6–4	(Kazakhstan) Beibit Zhukayev	(Austria) Maximilian Neuchrist (Germany) Daniel Masur	(Sweden) Karl Friberg; Yan Sabanin (France) Matteo Martineau (Austria) Neil Oberleitner
March 13	Trimbach, Switzerland; Carpet (i); M25; Singles and Doubles Draws	(Germany) Johannes Härteis (Germany) Daniel Masur; 7–6^{(7–3)}, 6–7^{(3–7)}, [10–5]	(United Kingdom) Charles Broom (United Kingdom) Anton Matusevich	(Austria) Maximilian Neuchrist (Germany) Daniel Masur	(Sweden) Karl Friberg; Yan Sabanin (France) Matteo Martineau (Austria) Neil Oberleitner
March 13	Montreal, Canada; Hard (i); M25; Singles and Doubles Draws	(Canada) Gabriel Diallo; 7–6^{(7–5)}, 6–3	(Germany) Henri Squire	(United States) Strong Kirchheimer (France) Jaimee Floyd Angele	(Belgium) Tibo Colson (United States) Alfredo Perez (France) Jules Marie (Republic of Ireland) Osgar O'Hoisin
March 13	Montreal, Canada; Hard (i); M25; Singles and Doubles Draws	(United States) Ezekiel Clark (United States) Alfredo Perez; 7–5, 7–6^{(7–4)}	(United States) Tristan McCormick (United States) Jakub Wojcik	(United States) Strong Kirchheimer (France) Jaimee Floyd Angele	(Belgium) Tibo Colson (United States) Alfredo Perez (France) Jules Marie (Republic of Ireland) Osgar O'Hoisin
March 13	Anapoima, Colombia; Clay; M25; Singles and Doubles Draws	(France) Térence Atmane; 6–3, 6–2	(France) Émilien Voisin	(Brazil) Eduardo Ribeiro (Colombia) Nicolás Mejía	(Argentina) Alex Barrena (Kazakhstan) Denis Yevseyev (Germany) Elmar Ejupovic (Colombia) Johan Alexander Rodríguez Rodríguez
March 13	Anapoima, Colombia; Clay; M25; Singles and Doubles Draws	(Italy) Lorenzo Claverie (Netherlands) Thijmen Loof; 6–7^{(5–7)}, 6–4, [10–8]	(Argentina) Matías Franco Descotte (Argentina) Matías Zukas	(Brazil) Eduardo Ribeiro (Colombia) Nicolás Mejía	(Argentina) Alex Barrena (Kazakhstan) Denis Yevseyev (Germany) Elmar Ejupovic (Colombia) Johan Alexander Rodríguez Rodríguez
March 13	Bakersfield, United States; Hard; M25; Singles and Doubles Draws	(Australia) Alex Bolt; 6–3, 7–6^{(7–3)}	(United States) Kyle Kang	(United States) Alex Michelsen (United States) Christian Langmo	(Japan) Naoki Nakagawa (United States) Aidan Mayo (United Kingdom) Adam Jones (Japan) Yuta Shimizu
March 13	Bakersfield, United States; Hard; M25; Singles and Doubles Draws	(United States) Vasil Kirkov (United States) Christian Langmo; 7–5, 7–6^{(7–2)}	(United Kingdom) Blu Baker (United States) Sekou Bangoura	(United States) Alex Michelsen (United States) Christian Langmo	(Japan) Naoki Nakagawa (United States) Aidan Mayo (United Kingdom) Adam Jones (Japan) Yuta Shimizu
March 13	Poitiers, France; Hard (i); M15; Singles and Doubles Draws	(France) Sascha Gueymard Wayenburg; 7–6^{(9–7)}, 6–4	(France) Antoine Ghibaudo	(France) Antoine Hoang (North Macedonia) Kalin Ivanovski	Mikalai Haliak (Italy) Lorenzo Sciahbasi (France) Tristan Lamasine (Belgium) Simon Beaupain
March 13	Poitiers, France; Hard (i); M15; Singles and Doubles Draws	(Belgium) Simon Beaupain (France) Antoine Hoang; 2–6, 6–3, [10–3]	(France) Paul Cayre (France) Axel Garcian	(France) Antoine Hoang (North Macedonia) Kalin Ivanovski	Mikalai Haliak (Italy) Lorenzo Sciahbasi (France) Tristan Lamasine (Belgium) Simon Beaupain
March 13	Heraklion, Greece; Hard; M15; Singles and Doubles Draws	(Monaco) Lucas Catarina; 6–3, 6–2	(France) François Musitelli	(Israel) Orel Kimhi (Ecuador) Andrés Andrade	(Netherlands) Sidané Pontjodikromo (Italy) Andrea Picchione (Germany) Kai Lemstra (Finland) Aleksi Löfman
March 13	Heraklion, Greece; Hard; M15; Singles and Doubles Draws	(Georgia (country)) Aleksandre Bakshi (Germany) Kai Lemstra; 6–3, 6–4	(Republic of Ireland) Simon Carr (France) François Musitelli	(Israel) Orel Kimhi (Ecuador) Andrés Andrade	(Netherlands) Sidané Pontjodikromo (Italy) Andrea Picchione (Germany) Kai Lemstra (Finland) Aleksi Löfman
March 13	Kish Island, Iran; Clay; M15; Singles and Doubles Draws	Denis Klok; 3–6, 6–1, 6–3	(Syria) Hazem Naw	(Italy) Andrea Bacaloni (India) S D Prajwal Dev	(France) Maxence Brovillé (France) Lilian Marmousez; Egor Agafonov (Czech Republic) Filip Apltauer
March 13	Kish Island, Iran; Clay; M15; Singles and Doubles Draws	Egor Agafonov; Vladislav Ivanov; 6–1, 7–6^{(9–7)}	(Italy) Leonardo Catani (Italy) Marco Miceli	(Italy) Andrea Bacaloni (India) S D Prajwal Dev	(France) Maxence Brovillé (France) Lilian Marmousez; Egor Agafonov (Czech Republic) Filip Apltauer
March 13	Rovinj, Croatia; Clay; M15; Singles and Doubles Draws	(Croatia) Matej Dodig; 6–0, 6–2	(Italy) Federico Arnaboldi	(Italy) Fausto Tabacco (Romania) Cezar Crețu	(Spain) Sergi Pérez Contri (Serbia) Vuk Rađenović (Czech Republic) Pavel Nejedlý (Ukraine) Oleksandr Ovcharenko
March 13	Rovinj, Croatia; Clay; M15; Singles and Doubles Draws	(Croatia) Luka Mikrut (Serbia) Stefan Popović; 6–3, 6–1	(Ukraine) Igor Dudun (Ukraine) Artem Podorozhnyi	(Italy) Fausto Tabacco (Romania) Cezar Crețu	(Spain) Sergi Pérez Contri (Serbia) Vuk Rađenović (Czech Republic) Pavel Nejedlý (Ukraine) Oleksandr Ovcharenko
March 13	Sharm El Sheikh, Egypt; Hard; M15; Singles and Doubles Draws	(United States) Joshua Sheehy; 7–6^{(8–6)}, 6–4	(Slovakia) Lukáš Pokorný	(Germany) Robert Strombachs (Bulgaria) Petr Nesterov	(Georgia (country)) Saba Purtseladze (Germany) Jakob Schnaitter (United States) Kareem Al Allaf (United Kingdom) Hamish Stewart
March 13	Sharm El Sheikh, Egypt; Hard; M15; Singles and Doubles Draws	(South Africa) Alec Beckley (Bulgaria) Petr Nesterov; 3–6, 6–3, [10–8]	(Luxembourg) Alex Knaff (Germany) Jakob Schnaitter	(Germany) Robert Strombachs (Bulgaria) Petr Nesterov	(Georgia (country)) Saba Purtseladze (Germany) Jakob Schnaitter (United States) Kareem Al Allaf (United Kingdom) Hamish Stewart
March 13	Antalya, Turkey; Clay; M15; Singles and Doubles Draws	(Sweden) Dragoș Nicolae Mădăraș; 6–3, 6–1	(Belgium) Gilles-Arnaud Bailly	(Austria) Joel Schwärzler (Italy) Luca Tomasetto	(Georgia (country)) Aleksandre Metreveli; Andrey Chepelev (France) Arthur Géa (Italy) Edoardo Lavagno
March 13	Antalya, Turkey; Clay; M15; Singles and Doubles Draws	(Brazil) Igor Gimenez (Brazil) Nicolas Zanellato; 1–6, 7–5, [10–6]	(Germany) Tom Gentzsch (Germany) Leopold Zima	(Austria) Joel Schwärzler (Italy) Luca Tomasetto	(Georgia (country)) Aleksandre Metreveli; Andrey Chepelev (France) Arthur Géa (Italy) Edoardo Lavagno
March 13	Monastir, Tunisia; Hard; M15; Singles and Doubles Draws	(Italy) Lorenzo Rottoli; 7–6^{(7–5)}, 6–3	(Poland) Olaf Pieczkowski	(Italy) Simone Roncalli (Chinese Taipei) Ray Ho	(Poland) Tomasz Berkieta (Poland) Szymon Kielan (Italy) Stefano Napolitano (Germany) Christoph Negritu
March 13	Monastir, Tunisia; Hard; M15; Singles and Doubles Draws	(Chinese Taipei) Ray Ho (Germany) Christoph Negritu; 6–1, 6–3	(Italy) Lorenzo Rottoli (Italy) Luigi Sorrentino	(Italy) Simone Roncalli (Chinese Taipei) Ray Ho	(Poland) Tomasz Berkieta (Poland) Szymon Kielan (Italy) Stefano Napolitano (Germany) Christoph Negritu
March 20	Palmanova, Spain; Clay; M25; Singles and Doubles Draws	(Netherlands) Max Houkes; 4–6, 6–1, 6–2	(Italy) Stefano Travaglia	(Argentina) Hernán Casanova (Italy) Gianmarco Ferrari	(Italy) Alexander Weis (Spain) Pablo Llamas Ruiz (Lithuania) Vilius Gaubas (Spain) Àlex Martí Pujolràs
March 20	Palmanova, Spain; Clay; M25; Singles and Doubles Draws	(Netherlands) Jesper de Jong (Netherlands) Max Houkes; 6–3, 6–4	(Romania) Alexandru Jecan (Germany) Kai Wehnelt	(Argentina) Hernán Casanova (Italy) Gianmarco Ferrari	(Italy) Alexander Weis (Spain) Pablo Llamas Ruiz (Lithuania) Vilius Gaubas (Spain) Àlex Martí Pujolràs
March 20	Canberra, Australia; Clay; M25; Singles and Doubles Draws	(Australia) Dane Sweeny; 6–7^{(1–7)}, 7–6^{(7–5)}, 6–4	(Australia) Marc Polmans	(Japan) Yuki Mochizuki (Australia) Tristan Schoolkate	(Japan) Tatsuma Ito (Australia) Dayne Kelly (Japan) Keisuke Saitoh (Australia) Matthew Dellavedova
March 20	Canberra, Australia; Clay; M25; Singles and Doubles Draws	(Japan) Taisei Ichikawa (Japan) Daisuke Sumizawa; 7–6^{(8–6)}, 5–7, [10–3]	(Australia) Matthew Romios (Australia) Brandon Walkin	(Japan) Yuki Mochizuki (Australia) Tristan Schoolkate	(Japan) Tatsuma Ito (Australia) Dayne Kelly (Japan) Keisuke Saitoh (Australia) Matthew Dellavedova
March 20	Toulouse-Balma, France; Hard (i); M25; Singles and Doubles Draws	Nikolay Vylegzhanin; 3–6, 6–1, 6–2	(United Kingdom) Harry Wendelken	(France) Tristan Lamasine (Ivory Coast) Eliakim Coulibaly	(France) Arthur Bouquier (Portugal) Gonçalo Oliveira (China) Te Rigele (Uzbekistan) Khumoyun Sultanov
March 20	Toulouse-Balma, France; Hard (i); M25; Singles and Doubles Draws	(Denmark) August Holmgren (Denmark) Christian Sigsgaard; 6–1, 6–2	(France) Adan Freire da Silva (France) Loann Massard	(France) Tristan Lamasine (Ivory Coast) Eliakim Coulibaly	(France) Arthur Bouquier (Portugal) Gonçalo Oliveira (China) Te Rigele (Uzbekistan) Khumoyun Sultanov
March 20	Lucknow, India; Hard; M25; Singles and Doubles Draws	Evgeny Donskoy; 6–2, 7–5	(Ukraine) Eric Vanshelboim	(Vietnam) Lý Hoàng Nam (India) Mukund Sasikumar	(India) Siddharth Vishwakarma (Ukraine) Vladyslav Orlov (India) Karan Singh (United States) Oliver Crawford
March 20	Lucknow, India; Hard; M25; Singles and Doubles Draws	(Australia) Blake Ellis (Japan) Shuichi Sekiguchi; 6–2, 6–7^{(4–7)}, [10–8]	(India) Parikshit Somani (India) Manish Sureshkumar	(Vietnam) Lý Hoàng Nam (India) Mukund Sasikumar	(India) Siddharth Vishwakarma (Ukraine) Vladyslav Orlov (India) Karan Singh (United States) Oliver Crawford
March 20	Mosquera, Colombia; Clay; M25; Singles and Doubles Draws	(Brazil) Mateus Alves; 6–2, 7–6^{(7–5)}	(Colombia) Johan Alexander Rodríguez Rodríguez	(Bolivia) Murkel Dellien (Colombia) Alejandro Hoyos Franco	(United Kingdom) Jan Choinski (Argentina) Valerio Aboian (Chile) Gonzalo Lama (United States) Victor Lilov
March 20	Mosquera, Colombia; Clay; M25; Singles and Doubles Draws	(Argentina) Tomás Farjat (Argentina) Ignacio Monzón; 3–6, 7–5, [11–9]	(Colombia) Juan Sebastián Gómez (Peru) Jorge Panta	(Bolivia) Murkel Dellien (Colombia) Alejandro Hoyos Franco	(United Kingdom) Jan Choinski (Argentina) Valerio Aboian (Chile) Gonzalo Lama (United States) Victor Lilov
March 20	Calabasas, United States; Hard; M25; Singles and Doubles Draws	(United States) Nathan Ponwith; 6–3, 6–7^{(5–7)}, 7–5	(United States) Alex Michelsen	(Australia) Luke Saville (United States) Toby Kodat	(South Africa) Kris van Wyk (Japan) Naoki Nakagawa (United States) Aidan Mayo (United States) Andrew Rogers
March 20	Calabasas, United States; Hard; M25; Singles and Doubles Draws	(United States) Cooper Williams (Australia) Edward Winter; 6–2, 6–3	(United States) Rohan Murali (United States) Elijah Strode	(Australia) Luke Saville (United States) Toby Kodat	(South Africa) Kris van Wyk (Japan) Naoki Nakagawa (United States) Aidan Mayo (United States) Andrew Rogers
March 20	Heraklion, Greece; Hard; M15; Singles and Doubles Draws	(Monaco) Lucas Catarina; 6–3, 6–2	(Romania) Sebastian Gima	(Denmark) Elmer Møller (Bulgaria) Nikolay Nedelchev	(Italy) Andrea Picchione (Ecuador) Andrés Andrade (Georgia (country)) Aleksandre Bakshi (France) François Musitelli
March 20	Heraklion, Greece; Hard; M15; Singles and Doubles Draws	(Ecuador) Andrés Andrade (Italy) Andrea Picchione; 6–3, 6–3	(Czech Republic) Matthew William Donald (Denmark) Elmer Møller	(Denmark) Elmer Møller (Bulgaria) Nikolay Nedelchev	(Italy) Andrea Picchione (Ecuador) Andrés Andrade (Georgia (country)) Aleksandre Bakshi (France) François Musitelli
March 20	Opatija, Croatia; Clay; M15; Singles and Doubles Draws	(Ukraine) Viacheslav Bielinskyi; 6–1, 2–6, 6–3	(Spain) Sergi Pérez Contri	(Germany) Timo Stodder (Croatia) Luka Mikrut	(Bosnia and Herzegovina) Andrej Nedić (Italy) Daniele Capecchi (Croatia) Matej Dodig (Switzerland) Rémy Bertola
March 20	Opatija, Croatia; Clay; M15; Singles and Doubles Draws	(Ukraine) Viacheslav Bielinskyi (Ukraine) Oleksandr Ovcharenko; 6–2, 6–4	(Croatia) Luka Mikrut (Serbia) Stefan Popović	(Germany) Timo Stodder (Croatia) Luka Mikrut	(Bosnia and Herzegovina) Andrej Nedić (Italy) Daniele Capecchi (Croatia) Matej Dodig (Switzerland) Rémy Bertola
March 20	Sharm El Sheikh, Egypt; Hard; M15; Singles and Doubles Draws	Marat Sharipov; 6–1, 6–1	(Egypt) Amr Elsayed	(Turkey) Tuncay Duran (Czech Republic) Jiří Barnat	(Turkey) Koray Kırcı (Poland) Paweł Ciaś (Moldova) Alexander Cozbinov (Israel) Yshai Oliel
March 20	Sharm El Sheikh, Egypt; Hard; M15; Singles and Doubles Draws	(Czech Republic) Jiří Barnat (Czech Republic) Matěj Vocel; 7–6^{(7–0)}, 6–4	(United Kingdom) Matthew Howse (United Kingdom) Joel Pierleoni	(Turkey) Tuncay Duran (Czech Republic) Jiří Barnat	(Turkey) Koray Kırcı (Poland) Paweł Ciaś (Moldova) Alexander Cozbinov (Israel) Yshai Oliel
March 20	Antalya, Turkey; Clay; M15; Singles and Doubles Draws	(Belgium) Gilles-Arnaud Bailly; 6–3, 4–6, 7–5	(Germany) Peter Heller	(South Korea) Gerard Campaña Lee (Romania) Călin Manda	(Argentina) Juan Bautista Otegui (Germany) Tom Gentzsch (Spain) Max Alcalá Gurri (Italy) Manuel Mazza
March 20	Antalya, Turkey; Clay; M15; Singles and Doubles Draws	(Brazil) Igor Gimenez (Italy) Elio José Ribeiro Lago; 6–7^{(4–7)}, 7–5, [10–8]	(Switzerland) Louroi Martinez (Morocco) Adam Moundir	(South Korea) Gerard Campaña Lee (Romania) Călin Manda	(Argentina) Juan Bautista Otegui (Germany) Tom Gentzsch (Spain) Max Alcalá Gurri (Italy) Manuel Mazza
March 20	Monastir, Tunisia; Hard; M15; Singles and Doubles Draws	(France) Alexandre Aubriot; 6–7^{(4–7)}, 6–2, 6–4	(France) Maxence Beaugé	(Italy) Lorenzo Rottoli (Chinese Taipei) Ray Ho	(China) Mu Tao (France) Nicolas Tepmahc (Germany) Christoph Negritu (Italy) Simone Roncalli
March 20	Monastir, Tunisia; Hard; M15; Singles and Doubles Draws	(China) Dong Bohua (China) Gao Xin; 7–6^{(7–5)}, 3–6, [10–5]	(Tunisia) Wissam Abderrahman (Portugal) Tiago Pereira	(Italy) Lorenzo Rottoli (Chinese Taipei) Ray Ho	(China) Mu Tao (France) Nicolas Tepmahc (Germany) Christoph Negritu (Italy) Simone Roncalli
March 27	Trnava, Slovakia; Hard (i); M25; Singles and Doubles Draws	(Czech Republic) Jakub Menšík; 7–6^{(8–6)}, 6–3	(Sweden) Karl Friberg	(Turkey) Yankı Erel (Belgium) Tibo Colson	(Turkey) Sarp Ağabigün (Slovakia) Lukáš Pokorný (Slovakia) Peter Benjamín Privara (Ivory Coast) Eliakim Coulibaly
March 27	Trnava, Slovakia; Hard (i); M25; Singles and Doubles Draws	(Czech Republic) Jiří Barnat (Czech Republic) Filip Duda; 1–6, 6–3, [10–7]	(Poland) Szymon Kielan (Austria) David Pichler	(Turkey) Yankı Erel (Belgium) Tibo Colson	(Turkey) Sarp Ağabigün (Slovakia) Lukáš Pokorný (Slovakia) Peter Benjamín Privara (Ivory Coast) Eliakim Coulibaly
March 27	Saint-Dizier, France; Hard (i); M25; Singles and Doubles Draws	(France) Clément Chidekh; 7–6^{(7–4)}, 6–1	(Uzbekistan) Khumoyun Sultanov	(France) Lucas Poullain (Switzerland) Yannik Steinegger	(France) Matteo Martineau (Germany) Florian Broska (Germany) Tim Handel (France) Alexis Gautier
March 27	Saint-Dizier, France; Hard (i); M25; Singles and Doubles Draws	(Denmark) August Holmgren (Denmark) Christian Sigsgaard; 6–2, 6–3	(Spain) David Jordà Sanchis (China) Te Rigele	(France) Lucas Poullain (Switzerland) Yannik Steinegger	(France) Matteo Martineau (Germany) Florian Broska (Germany) Tim Handel (France) Alexis Gautier
March 27	Trento, Italy; Hard (i); M25; Singles and Doubles Draws	(Switzerland) Jérôme Kym; 7–6^{(9–7)}, 6–2	(United Kingdom) Alastair Gray	(United Kingdom) Anton Matusevich (Italy) Enrico Dalla Valle	(Italy) Francesco Forti (Italy) Giovanni Oradini (Italy) Lorenzo Rottoli (United Kingdom) Charles Broom
March 27	Trento, Italy; Hard (i); M25; Singles and Doubles Draws	(United Kingdom) Daniel Little (United Kingdom) Mark Whitehouse; 7–6^{(8–6)}, 6–3	(United Kingdom) Giles Hussey (United Kingdom) Ben Jones	(United Kingdom) Anton Matusevich (Italy) Enrico Dalla Valle	(Italy) Francesco Forti (Italy) Giovanni Oradini (Italy) Lorenzo Rottoli (United Kingdom) Charles Broom
March 27	Tsukuba, Japan; Hard; M25; Singles and Doubles Draws	(Chinese Taipei) Hsu Yu-hsiou; 7–6^{(7–5)}, 6–4	(Japan) Sho Shimabukuro	(Japan) Renta Tokuda (Australia) Dane Sweeny	(Japan) Yusuke Takahashi (Japan) Yuki Mochizuki (Japan) Hiroki Moriya (Japan) Tatsuma Ito
March 27	Tsukuba, Japan; Hard; M25; Singles and Doubles Draws	(Chinese Taipei) Hsu Yu-hsiou (Chinese Taipei) Huang Tsung-hao; 7–6^{(8–6)}, 3–6, [10–5]	(Japan) Shinji Hazawa (Japan) Hikaru Shiraishi	(Japan) Renta Tokuda (Australia) Dane Sweeny	(Japan) Yusuke Takahashi (Japan) Yuki Mochizuki (Japan) Hiroki Moriya (Japan) Tatsuma Ito
March 27	Mysuru, India; Hard; M25; Singles and Doubles Draws	(United Kingdom) George Loffhagen; 4–6, 6–2, 7–6^{(7–4)}	(Australia) Blake Ellis	(India) S D Prajwal Dev (United States) Oliver Crawford	(India) Karan Singh (India) Mukund Sasikumar (Ukraine) Vladyslav Orlov (France) Florent Bax
March 27	Mysuru, India; Hard; M25; Singles and Doubles Draws	(India) Mukund Sasikumar (India) Vishnu Vardhan; 6–3, 6–4	(India) Rithvik Choudary Bollipalli (India) Niki Kaliyanda Poonacha	(India) S D Prajwal Dev (United States) Oliver Crawford	(India) Karan Singh (India) Mukund Sasikumar (Ukraine) Vladyslav Orlov (France) Florent Bax
March 27	Sharm El Sheikh, Egypt; Hard; M15; Singles and Doubles Draws	(Egypt) Mohamed Safwat; 6–4, 6–0	Ilia Simakin	(Georgia (country)) Zura Tkemaladze; Alexander Zgirovsky	(China) Wang Chukang (Italy) Gabriele Bosio (South Africa) Alec Beckley (Ukraine) Illya Beloborodko
March 27	Sharm El Sheikh, Egypt; Hard; M15; Singles and Doubles Draws	(United Kingdom) Matthew Howse (United Kingdom) Joel Pierleoni; 7–6^{(7–2)}, 6–1	(Turkey) Cengiz Aksu (Turkey) Tuncay Duran	(Georgia (country)) Zura Tkemaladze; Alexander Zgirovsky	(China) Wang Chukang (Italy) Gabriele Bosio (South Africa) Alec Beckley (Ukraine) Illya Beloborodko
March 27	Antalya, Turkey; Clay; M15 and Doubles Draws	(Romania) Cezar Crețu; 6–2, 1–6, 7–6^{(7–5)}	(Sweden) Dragoș Nicolae Mădăraș	(Argentina) Juan Pablo Paz (Germany) Peter Heller	(Spain) Max Alcalá Gurri (France) Arthur Géa (Switzerland) Mirko Martinez (Netherlands) Sidané Pontjodikromo
March 27	Antalya, Turkey; Clay; M15 and Doubles Draws	(Netherlands) Guy den Heijer (Netherlands) Sidané Pontjodikromo; 6–3, 3–6, [10–7]	(Brazil) Igor Gimenez (Italy) Elio José Ribeiro Lago	(Argentina) Juan Pablo Paz (Germany) Peter Heller	(Spain) Max Alcalá Gurri (France) Arthur Géa (Switzerland) Mirko Martinez (Netherlands) Sidané Pontjodikromo
March 27	Monastir, Tunisia; Hard; M15; Singles and Doubles Draws	(Germany) Luca Wiedenmann; 6–4, 6–3	(Belgium) Buvaysar Gadamauri	(France) Nicolas Tepmahc (Spain) Adrià Soriano Barrera	(Chinese Taipei) Ray Ho (China) Wang Xiaofei (France) Alexandre Reco (Tunisia) Wissam Abderrahman
March 27	Monastir, Tunisia; Hard; M15; Singles and Doubles Draws	(Chinese Taipei) Ray Ho (Germany) Christoph Negritu; 6–4, 6–1	(China) Wang Xiaofei (China) Zheng Zhan	(France) Nicolas Tepmahc (Spain) Adrià Soriano Barrera	(Chinese Taipei) Ray Ho (China) Wang Xiaofei (France) Alexandre Reco (Tunisia) Wissam Abderrahman
