= 2026 Moldova Open =

- Date: 25 – 31 May
- Edition: 2nd
- Surface: Clay
- Location: Chișinău, Moldova

Champions

Singles
- (Greece) Stefanos Sakellaridis

Doubles
- (United States) George Goldhoff / (United States) Theodore Winegar
- Moldova Open

The 2026 Moldova Open was a professional tennis tournament played on clay courts. It was the second edition of the tournament which was part of the 2026 ATP Challenger Tour. It took place in Chișinău, Moldova between 25 and 31 May 2026.

== Singles main-draw entrants ==
=== Seeds ===
| Country | Player | Rank^{1} | Seed |
|---|---|---|---|
| ITA | Francesco Maestrelli | 128 | 1 |
| CZE | Zdeněk Kolář | 162 | 2 |
| ITA | Luca Nardi | 163 | 3 |
| EST | Daniil Glinka | 174 | 4 |
| SWE | Elias Ymer | 179 | 5 |
| ARG | Federico Agustín Gómez | 181 | 6 |
| BEL | Gauthier Onclin | 184 | 7 |
| KAZ | Timofey Skatov | 191 | 8 |

- ^{1} Rankings are as of 18 May 2026.

=== Other entrants ===
The following players received wildcards into the singles main draw:

- (Moldova) Radu Albot
- (Georgia (country)) Saba Purtseladze
- (Moldova) Ilya Snițari

The following players received entry into the singles main draw as alternates:

- (Italy) Franco Agamenone
- (Serbia) Laslo Djere
- (India) Sumit Nagal

The following players received entry from the qualifying draw:

- (Romania) Cezar Crețu
- (Brazil) Daniel Dutra da Silva
- (Uzbekistan) Sergey Fomin
- (France) Maxime Janvier
- (Serbia) Stefan Latinović
- (Spain) Àlex Martínez

== Champions ==
=== Singles ===
- (Greece) Stefanos Sakellaridis def. (Romania) Cezar Crețu 6–7^{(1–7)}, 6–3, 6–3.

=== Doubles ===
- (United States) George Goldhoff / (United States) Theodore Winegar def. (United States) Nathaniel Lammons / (United States) Jackson Withrow 6–1, 6–4.
