= 2025 Moldova Open =

- Date: 26 May – 1 June
- Edition: 1st
- Surface: Hard
- Location: Chișinău, Moldova

Champions

Singles
- (France) Clément Chidekh

Doubles
- (Poland) Szymon Kielan / (Poland) Filip Pieczonka
- Moldova Open

The 2025 Moldova Open was a professional tennis tournament played on hardcourts. It was the first edition of the tournament which was part of the 2025 ATP Challenger Tour. It took place in Chișinău, Moldova between 26 May and 1 June 2025.

== Singles main-draw entrants ==
=== Seeds ===
Country	Player	Rank^{1}	Seed
	Ilia Simakin	247	1
GBR	Jay Clarke	250	2
KAZ	Denis Yevseyev	271	3
MDA	Radu Albot	278	4
GEO	Saba Purtseladze	286	5
FRA	Robin Bertrand	294	6
ITA	Lorenzo Giustino	299	7
FRA	Clément Chidekh	309	8

- ^{1} Rankings are as of 19 May 2025.

=== Other entrants ===
The following players received wildcards into the singles main draw:

- (Georgia (country)) Aleksandre Bakshi
- (Turkey) Cem İlkel
- (Moldova) Ilya Snițari

The following player received entry into the singles main draw through the College Accelerator programme:

- (United Kingdom) Toby Samuel

The following player received entry into the singles main draw through the Junior Accelerator programme:

- (United Kingdom) Charlie Robertson

The following players received entry from the qualifying draw:

- (United Kingdom) Giles Hussey
- (France) Lilian Marmousez
- (United Kingdom) Stuart Parker
- (Poland) Olaf Pieczkowski
- (India) Mukund Sasikumar
- (United Kingdom) Harry Wendelken

== Champions ==
=== Singles ===
- (France) Clément Chidekh def. Ilia Simakin 7–6^{(8–6)}, 7–5.

=== Doubles ===
- (Poland) Szymon Kielan / (Poland) Filip Pieczonka def. (Slovakia) Lukáš Pokorný / Ilia Simakin 6–4, 6–0.
