= 2025 Moldova Open – Singles =

Singles
- 2025 Moldova Open

Final
- Champion: (France) Clément Chidekh
- Runner-up: Ilia Simakin
- Score: 7–6^{(8–6)}, 7–5

Events
Singles	Doubles
- Moldova Open

This was the first edition of the tournament.

Clément Chidekh won the title after defeating Ilia Simakin 7–6^{(8–6)}, 7–5 in the final.

== Seeds ==
1. Ilia Simakin (final)
2. (United Kingdom) Jay Clarke (first round)
3. (Kazakhstan) Denis Yevseyev (second round)
4. (Moldova) Radu Albot (second round)
5. (Georgia (country)) Saba Purtseladze (first round)
6. (France) Robin Bertrand (first round)
7. (Italy) Lorenzo Giustino (second round)
8. (France) Clément Chidekh (champion)

== Draw ==
Key

- Q = Qualifier
- WC = Wild card
- LL = Lucky loser
- Alt = Alternate
- ITF = ITF entry
- PR = Protected ranking
- SR = Special ranking
- SE = Special exempt
- JE = Junior exempt
- JR = Junior Accelerator Programme entrant
- CO = College Accelerator Programme entrant
- NG = Next Gen Accelerator Program entrant
- w/o = Walkover
- r = Retired
- d = Defaulted

=== Finals ===
Semifinals
1	Ilia Simakin	7	6
Q	(United Kingdom) Giles Hussey	5	3
CO	(United Kingdom) Toby Samuel	4	1
8	(France) Clément Chidekh	6	6

Final
1	Ilia Simakin	6^{6}	5
8	(France) Clément Chidekh	7^{8}	7

=== Top half ===
First round
1	I Simakin	7	7^{8}
JR	(United Kingdom) Charlie Robertson	5	6^{6}
(South Africa) P Henning	2	7^{7}	7
(Estonia) D Glinka	6	6^{3}	5
Q	(India) M Sasikumar	4	3
WC	(Turkey) C İlkel	6	6
P Bar Biryukov	6	7^{7}
5	(Georgia (country)) S Purtseladze	4	6^{2}
3	(Kazakhstan) D Yevseyev	3	6	6
Q	(United Kingdom) H Wendelken	6	1	4
(United Kingdom) C Broom	6^{2}	7^{7}	6^{7}
(Japan) K Uchida	7^{7}	6^{3}	7^{9}
(Japan) M Imamura	6	7
(Thailand) K Samrej	4	5
Q	(United Kingdom) G Hussey	7	6
6	(France) R Bertrand	5	1

Second round
1	I Simakin	6	6
(South Africa) P Henning	4	1
WC	(Turkey) C İlkel	4	7^{7}	6^{7}
P Bar Biryukov	6	6^{5}	7^{9}
3	(Kazakhstan) D Yevseyev	6^{5}	6^{2}
(Japan) K Uchida	7^{7}	7^{7}
(Japan) M Imamura	5	3
Q	(United Kingdom) G Hussey	7	6

Quarterfinals
1	I Simakin	6	4	6
P Bar Biryukov	3	6	2
(Japan) K Uchida	4	6^{4}
Q	(United Kingdom) G Hussey	6	7^{7}

Semifinals
1	I Simakin	7	6
Q	(United Kingdom) G Hussey	5	3

=== Bottom half ===
First round
7	(Italy) L Giustino	6	4	7^{9}
(United Kingdom) A Gray	2	6	6^{7}
Q	(United Kingdom) S Parker	6	6
WC	(Moldova) I Snițari	2	1
CO	(United Kingdom) T Samuel	7	6
Q	(France) Lilian Marmousez	5	2
(Lithuania) R Berankis	6^{3}	6	6^{7}
4	(Moldova) R Albot	7^{7}	4	7^{9}
8	(France) C Chidekh	6	7
(Slovakia) L Pokorný	2	5
WC	(Georgia (country)) A Bakshi	6^{6}	0^{r}
Q	(Poland) Olaf Pieczkowski	7^{8}	2
E Gerasimov	4	4
E Karlovskiy	6	6
(Latvia) R Strombachs	6	6
2	(United Kingdom) J Clarke	3	4

Second round
7	(Italy) L Giustino	4	2
Q	(United Kingdom) S Parker	6	6
CO	(United Kingdom) T Samuel	6	6
4	(Moldova) R Albot	4	3
8	(France) C Chidekh	6	0	6
Q	(Poland) O Pieczkowski	4	6	1
E Karlovskiy	3	2
(Latvia) R Strombachs	6	6

Quarterfinals
Q	(United Kingdom) S Parker	6	3	4
CO	(United Kingdom) T Samuel	4	6	6
8	(France) C Chidekh	6	6
(Latvia) R Strombachs	4	0

Semifinals
CO	(United Kingdom) T Samuel	4	1
8	(France) C Chidekh	6	6
