= 2026 Moldova Open – Singles =

Singles
- 2026 Moldova Open

Final
- Champion: (Greece) Stefanos Sakellaridis
- Runner-up: (Romania) Cezar Crețu
- Score: 6–7^{(1–7)}, 6–3, 6–3

Events
Singles	Doubles
- Moldova Open

Clément Chidekh was the defending champion but chose not to defend his title.

Stefanos Sakellaridis won the title after defeating Cezar Crețu 6–7^{(1–7)}, 6–3, 6–3 in the final.

== Seeds ==
1. (Italy) Francesco Maestrelli (first round)
2. (Czech Republic) Zdeněk Kolář (second round)
3. (Italy) Luca Nardi (quarterfinals)
4. (Estonia) Daniil Glinka (second round)
5. (Sweden) Elias Ymer (second round)
6. (Argentina) Federico Agustín Gómez (first round)
7. (Belgium) Gauthier Onclin (first round)
8. (Kazakhstan) Timofey Skatov (second round)

== Draw ==
Key

- Q = Qualifier
- WC = Wild card
- LL = Lucky loser
- Alt = Alternate
- ITF = ITF entry
- PR = Protected ranking
- SR = Special ranking
- SE = Special exempt
- JE = Junior exempt
- JR = Junior Accelerator Programme entrant
- CO = College Accelerator Programme entrant
- NG = Next Gen Accelerator Program entrant
- w/o = Walkover
- r = Retired
- d = Defaulted

=== Finals ===
Semifinals
WC	(Moldova) Radu Albot	2	6	2
Q	(Romania) Cezar Crețu	6	4	6
(Argentina) Genaro Alberto Olivieri	3	4
(Greece) Stefanos Sakellaridis	6	6

Final
Q	(Romania) Cezar Crețu	7^{7}	3	3
(Greece) Stefanos Sakellaridis	6^{1}	6	6

=== Top half ===
First round
1	(Italy) F Maestrelli	7^{7}	2	4
(Belgium) K Coppejans	6^{4}	6	6
(Romania) FC Jianu	6	2	3
Alt	(Italy) F Agamenone	2	6	6
WC	(Moldova) R Albot	6	0
Q	(France) M Janvier	3	0^{r}
Alt	(Serbia) L Djere	4	3
8	(Kazakhstan) T Skatov	6	6
4	(Estonia) D Glinka	6	6
Q	(Serbia) S Latinović	3	3
Q	(Brazil) D Dutra da Silva	3	0
(United Kingdom) L Broady	6	6
Q	(Romania) C Crețu	6	6
(Japan) Y Watanuki	1	4
P Kotov	6	3	6
7	(Belgium) G Onclin	1	6	4

Second round
(Belgium) K Coppejans	2	3
Alt	(Italy) F Agamenone	6	6
WC	(Moldova) R Albot	1	6	6
8	(Kazakhstan) T Skatov	6	1	4
4	(Estonia) D Glinka	2	6	3
(United Kingdom) L Broady	6	4	6
Q	(Romania) C Crețu	1	6	6
P Kotov	6	1	2

Quarterfinals
Alt	(Italy) F Agamenone	5	6^{2}
WC	(Moldova) R Albot	7	7^{7}
(United Kingdom) L Broady	3	0
Q	(Romania) C Crețu	6	6

Semifinals
WC	(Moldova) R Albot	2	6	2
Q	(Romania) C Crețu	6	4	6

=== Bottom half ===
First round
5	(Sweden) E Ymer	7^{7}	6
WC	(Georgia (country)) S Purtseladze	6^{4}	2
(Bosnia and Herzegovina) A Nedić	4	6	5
(Argentina) GA Olivieri	6	4	7
(Germany) M Topo	4	7	2
(Italy) L Giustino	6	5	6
(France) H Grenier	4	3
3	(Italy) L Nardi	6	6
6	(Argentina) FA Gómez	3	5
(Greece) S Sakellaridis	6	7
(Colombia) DE Galán	6	3	6^{1}
Q	(Spain) Àlex Martínez	3	6	7^{7}
Alt	(India) S Nagal	6	6
Q	(Uzbekistan) S Fomin	4	2
WC	(Moldova) I Snițari	4	3
2	(Czech Republic) Z Kolář	6	6

Second round
5	(Sweden) E Ymer	2	6^{5}
(Argentina) GA Olivieri	6	7^{7}
(Italy) L Giustino	7^{7}	4	4
3	(Italy) L Nardi	6^{2}	6	6
(Greece) S Sakellaridis	7^{7}	2
Q	(Spain) À Martínez	6^{2}	0^{r}
Alt	(India) S Nagal	6	7^{7}
2	(Czech Republic) Z Kolář	4	6^{4}

Quarterfinals
(Argentina) GA Olivieri	6	3	7^{7}
3	(Italy) L Nardi	0	6	6^{4}
(Greece) S Sakellaridis	6	6
Alt	(India) S Nagal	1	4

Semifinals
(Argentina) GA Olivieri	3	4
(Greece) S Sakellaridis	6	6
