= Moldova Open =

- 2026 Moldova Open

ATP Challenger Tour
- Location: Chișinău, Moldova
- Venue: National Tennis Center
- Category: ATP Challenger 100 (2026-)
- Surface: Hard; Clay
- Prize money: €160,680 (2026)
- Website: website

The Moldova Open is a professional tennis tournament played on hardcourts. It is currently part of the ATP Challenger Tour. It was first held in Chișinău, Moldova in 2025 and was the first ATP Challenger to take place in Moldova. In 2026 it was upgraded to a Challenger 100 and moved to clay courts.

== Past finals ==
=== Singles ===
Year	Champion	Runner-up	Score
2026	(Greece) Stefanos Sakellaridis	(Romania) Cezar Crețu	6–7^{(1–7)}, 6–3, 6–3
2025	(France) Clément Chidekh	Ilia Simakin	7–6^{(8–6)}, 7–5

=== Doubles ===
Year	Champions	Runners-up	Score
2026	(United States) George Goldhoff (United States) Theodore Winegar	(United States) Nathaniel Lammons (United States) Jackson Withrow	6–1, 6–4
2025	(Poland) Szymon Kielan (Poland) Filip Pieczonka	(Slovakia) Lukáš Pokorný; Ilia Simakin	6–4, 6–0
