= Stefanos Sakellaridis =

Greek tennis player (born 2004)

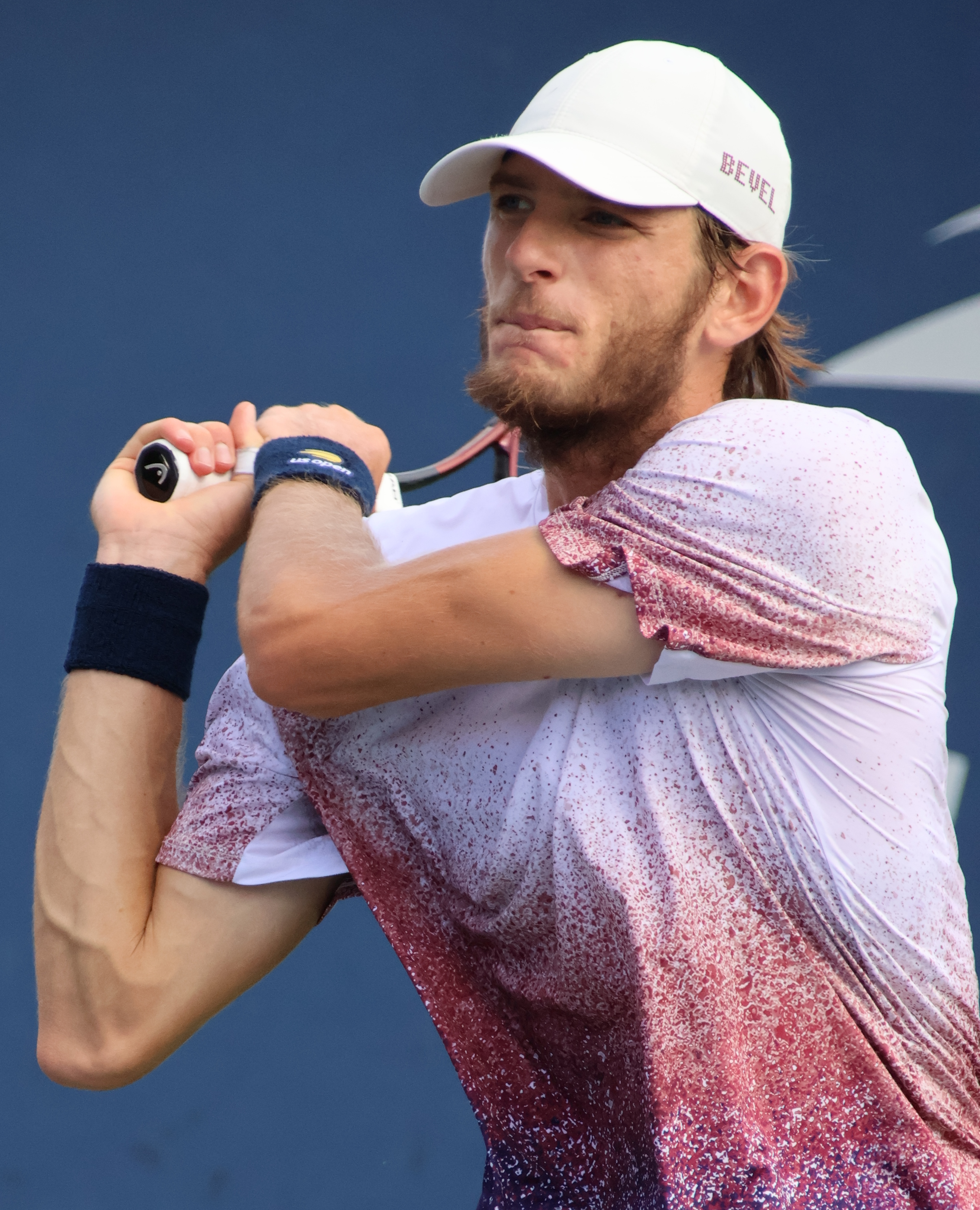
- Sakellaridis at the 2026 US Open
- Country (sports): Greece
- Born: 13 September 2004 (age 22) Athens, Greece
- Height: 1.98 m (6 ft 6 in)
- Plays: Right-handed (two-handed backhand)
- Prize money: US $510,758

Singles
- Career record: 4–10 (at ATP Tour level, Grand Slam tournament level, and in Davis Cup)
- Career titles: 0
- Highest ranking: No. 129 (2 November 2026)
- Current ranking: No. 129 (2 November 2026)

Grand Slam singles results
- French Open: Q2 (2026)
- Wimbledon: Q3 (2026)
- US Open: Q1 (2026)

Doubles
- Career record: 3–2 (ATP Tour-, major-level, and in Davis Cup)
- Career titles: 0
- Highest ranking: No. 285 (18 December 2023)
- Current ranking: No. 395 (2 November 2026)
- Last updated on: 2 November 2026.

Stefanos Sakellaridis (born 13 September 2004) is a Greek tennis player. Sakellaridis has a career-high ATP singles ranking of world No. 129 achieved on 2 November 2026 and a career-high ATP doubles ranking of No. 285 achieved on 18 December 2023. He is currently the No. 2 player from Greece.

== Career ==
=== 2023: ATP Tour debut ===
Sakellaridis made his ATP Tour main-draw debut at the 2023 United Cup representing Greece, where he won his first ATP Tour match ever against Belgian Zizou Bergs. As a result, he moved 130 positions up into the top 700.

=== 2025: Maiden Challenger doubles title, top 300 ===
In March, Sakellaridis won his Maiden Challenger doubles title at the Crete Challenger partnering with Petros Tsitsipas. The pair defeated Ilia Simakin and Kelsey Stevenson in the final.

=== 2026: Maiden Challenger singles title, top 250 ===
In February, Sakellaridis won his maiden Challenger title at the Delhi Open, defeating Oliver Crawford in the final. He reached a career high 220 in the ranking as a result. In May, Sakellaridis won his second Challenger title at the Moldova Open, defeating Cezar Crețu in the final.

== ATP Tour finals ==
=== Doubles: 1 (runner-up) ===
Legend Grand Slam (–) ATP 1000 (–) ATP 500 (–) ATP 250 (0–1)	Finals by surface Hard (–) Clay (–) Grass (0–1)	Finals by setting Outdoor (0–1) Indoor (–)

Result	W–L	Date	Tournament	Tier	Surface	Partner	Opponents	Score
Loss	0–1	Jun 2026	Stuttgart Open, Germany	ATP 250	Grass	(Estonia) Daniil Glinka	(Germany) Yannick Hanfmann (Germany) Jan-Lennard Struff	6–7^{(2–7)}, 6–3, [9–11]

== ATP Challenger Tour finals ==
=== Singles: 3 (2 titles, 1 runner-up) ===
Result	W–L	Date	Tournament	Tier	Surface	Opponent	Score
Win	1–0	Feb 2026	Delhi Open, India	Challenger	Hard	(United Kingdom) Oliver Crawford	7-5, 4–6, 7-6 ^{(8–6)}
Win	2–0	May 2026	Moldova Open, Moldova	Challenger	Hard	(Romania) Cezar Crețu	6–7^{(1–7)}, 6–3, 6–3
Loss	2–1	Aug 2026	Challenger de Québec, Canada	Challenger	Hard	(France) Luca Van Assche	1–6, 4–6

=== Doubles: 2 (1 title, 1 runner-up) ===
Result	W–L	Date	Tournament	Tier	Surface	Partner	Opponents	Score
Win	1–0	Mar 2025	Crete Challenger II, Greece	Challenger	Hard	(Greece) Petros Tsitsipas	Ilia Simakin (Canada) Kelsey Stevenson	6-2, 6–2
Loss	1–1	Sep 2025	Istanbul Challenger, Turkey	Challenger	Hard	(India) Karan Singh	(Slovakia) Miloš Karol (Germany) Daniel Masur	6-7^{(2–7)}, 1–6

== ITF Tour finals ==
=== Singles: 9 (3 titles, 6 runner-ups) ===
Result	W–L	Date	Tournament	Tier	Surface	Opponent	Score
Loss	0–1	Feb 2023	M15 Monastir, Tunisia	WTT	Hard	(Italy) Federico Iannaccone	6–3, 3–6, 2–6
Loss	0–2	May 2023	M25 Mataro, Spain	WTT	Hard	(Spain) Nikolás Sánchez Izquierdo	1–6, 4–6
Loss	0–3	Feb 2024	M15 Nakhon Si Thammarat, Thailand	WTT	Hard	(China) Cui Jie	4–6, 6–3, 3–6
Loss	0–4	Mar 2024	M15 Hinode, Japan	WTT	Hard	(China) Yan Bai	2–6, 4–6
Win	1–4	Feb 2025	M15 Monastir, Tunisia	WTT	Hard	(Italy) Fabrizio Andaloro	5–7, 7–6, 6–0
Win	2–4	Mar 2025	M15 Heraklion, Greece	WTT	Hard	(France) Pierre Delage	6–3, 6–3
Loss	2–5	Mar 2025	M15 Heraklion, Greece	WTT	Hard	(United Kingdom) Stuart Parker	2–6, 2–6
Win	3–5	Mar 2025	M15 Heraklion, Greece	WTT	Hard	(United Kingdom) Stuart Parker	2–6, 6–1, 6–4
Loss	3–6	Oct 2025	M15 Heraklion, Greece	WTT	Hard	(Switzerland) Luca Staeheli	4–6, 1–6

=== Doubles: 8 (1 title, 7 runner-ups) ===
Result	W–L	Date	Tournament	Tier	Surface	Partner	Opponents	Score
Win	1–0	Feb 2023	M15 Monastir, Tunisia	WTT	Hard	(South Africa) Chris van Wyk	(Uruguay) Franco Roncadelli (Italy) Fabrizio Antaloro	walkover
Loss	1–1	Mar 2023	M15 Monastir, Tunisia	WTT	Hard	(Greece) Dimitris Sakellaridis	(China) Gao Xin (China) Aoran Wang	2–6, 4–6
Loss	1–2	May 2023	M25 Gurb, Spain	WTT	Clay	(Greece) Dimitris Sakellaridis	(Israel) Daniel Cukierman (Argentina) Mariano Kestelboim	3–6, 3–6
Loss	1–3	May 2023	M25 La Nucia, Spain	WTT	Clay	(Greece) Dimitris Sakellaridis	(China) Fajing Sun (Egypt) Amr Elsayed	2–6, 3–6
Loss	1–4	Jul 2023	M25 Getxo, Spain	WTT	Clay	(Greece) Dimitris Sakellaridis	(Spain) Alex Martinez (Spain) Iñaki Montes de la Torre	6–7, 2–6
Loss	1–5	Jul 2023	M25 Esch/Alzette, Luxembourg	WTT	Clay	(Greece) Dimitris Sakellaridis	(Luxembourg) Alex Knaff (Luxembourg) Chris Rodesch	3–6, 4–6
Loss	1–6	Jul 2023	M25 Esch/Alzette, Luxembourg	WTT	Clay	(Greece) Dimitris Sakellaridis	(Luxembourg) Alex Knaff (Austria) David Pichler	6–1, 1–6, 7–10
Loss	1–7	Oct 2023	M15 Heraklion, Greece	WTT	Hard	(Greece) Dimitris Sakellaridis	(Switzerland) Dario Huber (Germany) Jacob Kahoun	2–6, 2–6
