= Cezar Crețu =

Romanian tennis player (born 2001)

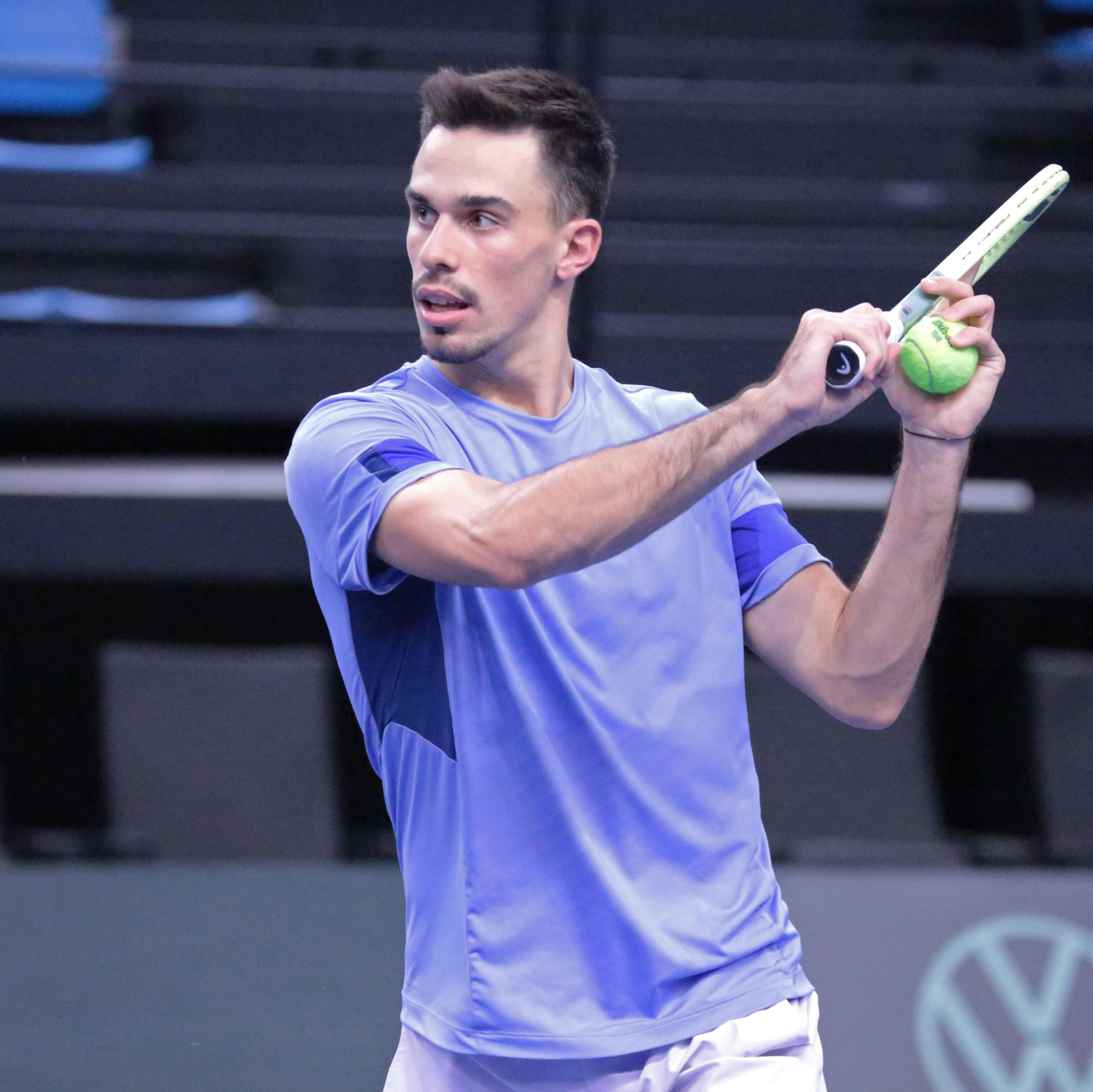
- Country (sports): Romania
- Residence: Bucharest, Romania
- Born: 24 April 2001 (age 25) Iași, Romania
- Height: 1.88 m (6 ft 2 in)
- Turned pro: 2020
- Plays: Right-handed (two-handed backhand)
- Coach: Victor Hănescu, Dave De Haan
- Prize money: US $214,037

Singles
- Career record: 5–0
- Career titles: 1 Challenger, 7 ITF
- Highest ranking: No. 230 (31 August 2026)
- Current ranking: No. 273 (9 November 2026)

Doubles
- Career record: 0–3
- Career titles: 1 Challenger, 10 ITF
- Highest ranking: No. 308 (11 November 2024)
- Current ranking: No. 751 (9 November 2026)
- Last updated on: 9 November 2026.

Cezar Crețu (born 24 April 2001) is a Romanian tennis player. He has a career high Association of Tennis Professionals (ATP) singles ranking of world No. 230 achieved on 31 August 2026 and a career high doubles ranking of world No. 308 achieved on 11 November 2024. He is currently the No. 3 Romanian player.

He represents Romania at the Davis Cup, where he has a W/L record of 4–1.

== Career ==
He made his ATP main draw debut at the 2024 Țiriac Open after receiving a wildcard into the singles qualifying draw and doubles main draw.

Crețu has won one ATP Challenger singles title at the 2026 Schwaben Open and one doubles title at the 2024 Iași Open with Bogdan Pavel.

== ATP Challenger Tour finals ==
=== Singles: 2 (1 title, 1 runner-up) ===
Legend ATP Challenger Tour (1–1)

Result	W–L	Date	Tournament	Tier	Surface	Opponent	Score
Loss	0–1	May 2026	Chișinău, Moldova	Challenger	Clay	(Greece) Stefanos Sakellaridis	7–6^{(7–1)}, 3–6, 3–6
Win	1–1	Aug 2026	Augsberg, Germany	Challenger	Clay	(Argentina) Facundo Mena	6–2, 6–0

=== Doubles: 1 (1 title) ===
Legend ATP Challenger Tour (1–0)

Result	W–L	Date	Tournament	Tier	Surface	Partner	Opponents	Score
Win	1–0	Jul 2024	Iași, Romania	Challenger	Clay	(Romania) Bogdan Pavel	(Poland) Karol Drzewiecki (Poland) Piotr Matuszewski	2–6, 6–2, [10–4]
