= Filip Pieczonka =

Polish tennis player (born 2004)

- Country (sports): Poland
- Born: 9 April 2004 (age 22) Gdańsk, Poland
- Height: 1.96 m (6 ft 5 in)
- Plays: Left-handed (two-handed backhand)
- College: Tennessee; Texas A&M
- Coach: Maciej Pieczonka
- Prize money: US $166,400

Singles
- Career record: 1–0 (at ATP Tour level, Grand Slam level, and in Davis Cup)
- Career titles: 0
- Highest ranking: No. 739 (9 June 2025)
- Current ranking: No. 872 (16 November)

Doubles
- Career record: 2–6 (at ATP Tour level, Grand Slam level, and in Davis Cup)
- Career titles: 4 Challenger, 7 ITF
- Highest ranking: No. 77 (16 November 2026)
- Current ranking: No. 77 (16 November 2026)

Grand Slam doubles results
- French Open: 1R (2026)
- Wimbledon: 2R (2026)
- US Open: 1R (2026)
- Last updated on: 16 November 2026.

Filip Pieczonka (born 9 April 2004) is a Polish tennis player. He has a career high ATP doubles ranking of world No. 77 achieved on 16 November 2026 and a singles ranking of No. 739 achieved on 9 June 2025.

Pieczonka played college tennis at Tennessee before transferring to Texas A&M.

== Career ==
Pieczonka has won one ATP Challenger doubles title at the 2025 Moldova Open.
