= Szymon Kielan =

Polish tennis player

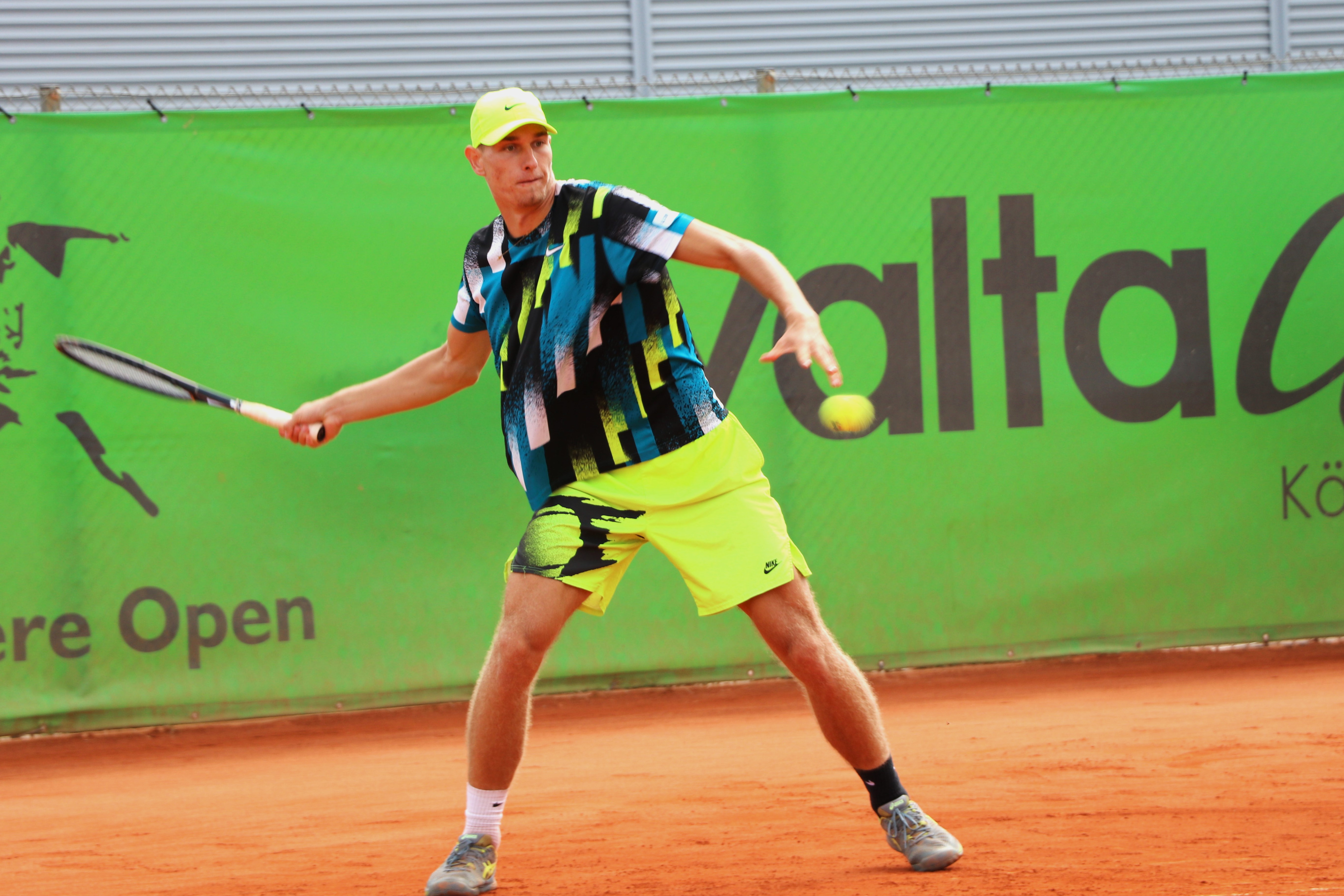
- Country (sports): Poland
- Born: 21 November 2002 (age 23) Łódź, Poland
- Height: 1.98 m (6 ft 6 in)
- Plays: Right-handed (two-handed backhand)
- Prize money: US $89,079

Singles
- Career record: 0–0
- Career titles: 0
- Highest ranking: No. 601 (27 February 2023)
- Current ranking: No. 1,283 (25 May 2026)

Doubles
- Career record: 0–0
- Career titles: 0
- Highest ranking: No. 113 (25 May 2026)
- Current ranking: No. 113 (25 May 2026)
- Last updated on: 25 May 2026.

Szymon Kielan (born 21 November 2002) is a Polish tennis player. He has a career high ATP doubles ranking of No. 113 achieved on 25 May 2026 and a singles ranking of No. 601 achieved on 27 February 2023. Kielan has won five ATP Challenger doubles titles.

== Career ==
He won his first Challenger title at the 2023 Tampere Open with Piotr Matuszewski.
