= 2026 Centurion Challenger – Doubles =

Doubles
- 2026 Centurion Challenger

Final
- Champions: (France) Constantin Bittoun Kouzmine (Latvia) Robert Strombachs
- Runners-up: (Turkey) Mert Alkaya (Turkey) Arda Azkara
- Score: 6–4, 6–4

Events
Singles	Doubles
- Centurion Challenger

This was the first edition of the tournament.

Constantin Bittoun Kouzmine and Robert Strombachs won the title after defeating Mert Alkaya and Arda Azkara 6–4, 6–4 in the final.

== Seeds ==
1. (France) Constantin Bittoun Kouzmine / (Latvia) Robert Strombachs (champions)
2. (United States) Keshav Chopra / (South Africa) Kris van Wyk (first round)
3. (Switzerland) Luca Castelnuovo / (Chinese Taipei) Jeffrey Hsu (first round)
4. (South Africa) Alec Beckley / (Bulgaria) Alexander Donski (quarterfinals)

== Draw ==
Key

- Q = Qualifier
- WC = Wild card
- LL = Lucky loser
- Alt = Alternate
- ITF = ITF entry
- PR = Protected ranking
- SR = Special ranking
- SE = Special exempt
- JE = Junior exempt
- JR = Junior Accelerator Programme entrant
- CO = College Accelerator Programme entrant
- NG = Next Gen Accelerator Program entrant
- w/o = Walkover
- r = Retired
- d = Defaulted

First round
1	(France) C Bittoun Kouzmine (Latvia) R Strombachs	6	6
(France) R Bertrand (Czech Republic) D Palán	2	4
(Australia) E Winter (Germany) P Zahraj	4	7^{7}	[4]
(United Kingdom) Millen Hurrion (United Kingdom) G Hussey	6	6^{5}	[10]
4	(South Africa) Alec Beckley (Bulgaria) A Donski	7	7^{7}
(Japan) A Santillan (China) B Zheng	5	6^{2}
(United Kingdom) T Hands (Poland) F Peliwo	3	1
(South Africa) P Henning (Zimbabwe) CJ Lock	6	6
(Cyprus) E Neos; Semen Pankin	6	7
(India) Atharva Sharma (India) K Singh	2	5
WC	(South Africa) Khololwam Montsi (Namibia) Connor Henry van Schalkwyk	7^{7}	5	[10]
3	(Switzerland) L Castelnuovo (Chinese Taipei) J Hsu	6^{5}	7	[5]
WC	(South Africa) Devin Badenhorst (South Africa) Luc Koenig	6^{5}	3
(Ivory Coast) E Coulibaly (France) C Hemery	7^{7}	6
(Turkey) Mert Alkaya (Turkey) A Azkara	4	6	[10]
2	(United States) K Chopra (South Africa) Kris van Wyk	6	3	[8]

Quarterfinals
1	(France) C Bittoun Kouzmine (Latvia) R Strombachs	0	6	[10]
(United Kingdom) M Hurrion (United Kingdom) G Hussey	6	4	[7]
4	(South Africa) A Beckley (Bulgaria) A Donski	5	5
(South Africa) P Henning (Zimbabwe) CJ Lock	7	7
(Cyprus) E Neos; S Pankin	6	6^{4}	[6]
WC	(South Africa) K Montsi (Namibia) CH van Schalkwyk	4	7^{7}	[10]
(Ivory Coast) E Coulibaly (France) C Hemery	3	4
(Turkey) M Alkaya (Turkey) A Azkara	6	6

Semifinals
1	(France) C Bittoun Kouzmine (Latvia) R Strombachs	6	6
(South Africa) P Henning (Zimbabwe) CJ Lock	2	4
WC	(South Africa) K Montsi (Namibia) CH van Schalkwyk	7	2	[6]
(Turkey) M Alkaya (Turkey) A Azkara	5	6	[10]

Final
1	(France) C Bittoun Kouzmine (Latvia) R Strombachs	6	6
(Turkey) M Alkaya (Turkey) A Azkara	4	4
