= 2026 Centurion Challenger II – Singles =

Singles
- 2026 Centurion Challenger II

Final
- Champion: (South Africa) Philip Henning
- Runner-up: (Bulgaria) Alexander Donski
- Score: 6–2, 3–6, 7–6^{(8–6)}

Events
Singles	Doubles
- Centurion Challenger

Giles Hussey was the defending champion but lost in the quarterfinals to Philip Henning.

Henning won the title after defeating Alexander Donski 6–2, 3–6, 7–6^{(8–6)} in the final.

== Seeds ==
1. (France) Harold Mayot (semifinals)
2. (Italy) Stefano Napolitano (first round, retired)
3. (France) Calvin Hemery (first round)
4. (France) Robin Bertrand (second round)
5. (Japan) Akira Santillan (first round)
6. (South Africa) Philip Henning (champion)
7. (Turkey) Mert Alkaya (first round)
8. (Ivory Coast) Eliakim Coulibaly (quarterfinals)

== Draw ==
Key

- Q = Qualifier
- WC = Wild card
- LL = Lucky loser
- Alt = Alternate
- ITF = ITF entry
- PR = Protected ranking
- SR = Special ranking
- SE = Special exempt
- JE = Junior exempt
- JR = Junior Accelerator Programme entrant
- CO = College Accelerator Programme entrant
- NG = Next Gen Accelerator Program entrant
- w/o = Walkover
- r = Retired
- d = Defaulted

=== Finals ===
Semifinals
1	(France) Harold Mayot	1	4
6	(South Africa) Philip Henning	6	6
WC	(South Africa) Khololwam Montsi	6	4	3
Q	(Bulgaria) Alexander Donski	4	6	6

Final
6	(South Africa) Philip Henning	6	3	7^{8}
Q	(Bulgaria) Alexander Donski	2	6	6^{6}

=== Top half ===
First round
1	(France) H Mayot	7^{7}	6^{8}	6
(Japan) Y Takahashi	6^{2}	7^{10}	0
WC	(South Africa) Luc Koenig	3	6	0
Semen Pankin	6	4	6
Q	(United Kingdom) Oscar Weightman	3	4
WC	(South Africa) Devin Badenhorst	6	6
(Poland) F Peliwo	3	1
8	(Ivory Coast) E Coulibaly	6	6
4	(France) R Bertrand	6	6
(Germany) P Zahraj	2	2
(India) M Sasikumar	5	2
(United Kingdom) G Hussey	7	6
(Latvia) R Strombachs	6^{5}	6	7^{7}
(United Kingdom) Millen Hurrion	7^{7}	3	6^{4}
Q	(Israel) Orel Kimhi	2	2
6	(South Africa) P Henning	6	6

Second round
1	(France) H Mayot	6	4	6
S Pankin	3	6	3
WC	(South Africa) D Badenhorst	7^{7}	3	2
8	(Ivory Coast) E Coulibaly	6^{2}	6	6
4	(France) R Bertrand	7	3	3
(United Kingdom) G Hussey	5	6	6
(Latvia) R Strombachs	2	3
6	(South Africa) P Henning	6	6

Quarterfinals
1	(France) H Mayot	7	6
8	(Ivory Coast) E Coulibaly	5	4
(United Kingdom) G Hussey	2	1
6	(South Africa) P Henning	6	6

Semifinals
1	(France) H Mayot	1	4
6	(South Africa) P Henning	6	6

=== Bottom half ===
First round
7	(Turkey) Mert Alkaya	6	3	2
(Turkey) A Azkara	4	6	6
Q	(France) Guillaume Dalmasso	6	6
(France) C Bittoun Kouzmine	4	3
(Switzerland) L Castelnuovo	4	2
(Spain) Mario González Fernández	6	6
WC	(South Africa) Khololwam Montsi	3	6	7
3	(France) C Hemery	6	3	5
5	(Japan) A Santillan	5	5
Q	(Bulgaria) A Donski	7	7
(India) Sidharth Rawat	3	2
(Australia) E Winter	6	6
(Czech Republic) D Palán	3	3
Q	(South Africa) Alec Beckley	6	6
Q	(Turkey) T Duran	6^{5}	7^{7}	3
2	(Italy) S Napolitano	7^{7}	6^{2}	0^{r}

Second round
(Turkey) A Azkara	7^{7}	6
Q	(France) G Dalmasso	6^{5}	2
(Spain) M González Fernández	1	3
WC	(South Africa) K Montsi	6	6
Q	(Bulgaria) A Donski	7^{7}	6^{4}	7
(Australia) E Winter	6^{2}	7^{7}	5
Q	(South Africa) A Beckley	3	4
Q	(Turkey) T Duran	6	6

Quarterfinals
(Turkey) A Azkara	1	4
WC	(South Africa) K Montsi	6	6
Q	(Bulgaria) A Donski	4	7^{8}	6
Q	(Turkey) T Duran	6	6^{6}	2

Semifinals
WC	(South Africa) K Montsi	6	4	3
Q	(Bulgaria) A Donski	4	6	6
