= 2026 Centurion Challenger II =

- Date: 1 – 7 June
- Edition: 2nd
- Surface: Hard
- Location: Centurion, South Africa

Champions

Singles
- (South Africa) Philip Henning

Doubles
- (Turkey) Arda Azkara / (Turkey) Tuncay Duran
- Centurion Challenger

The 2026 Centurion Challenger II, also known as the Rise Centurion Open (for sponsorship reasons), was a professional tennis tournament played on hardcourts. It was the second edition of the tournament which was part of the 2026 ATP Challenger Tour. It took place in Centurion, South Africa between 1 and 7 June 2026.

== Singles main-draw entrants ==
=== Seeds ===
Country	Player	Rank^{1}	Seed
FRA	Harold Mayot	214	1
ITA	Stefano Napolitano	246	2
FRA	Calvin Hemery	283	3
FRA	Robin Bertrand	286	4
JPN	Akira Santillan	307	5
RSA	Philip Henning	319	6
TUR	Mert Alkaya	321	7
CIV	Eliakim Coulibaly	330	8

- ^{1} Rankings are as of 25 May 2026.

=== Other entrants ===
The following players received wildcards into the singles main draw:

- (South Africa) Devin Badenhorst
- (South Africa) Luc Koenig
- (South Africa) Khololwam Montsi

The following players received entry from the qualifying draw:

- (South Africa) Alec Beckley
- (France) Guillaume Dalmasso
- (Bulgaria) Alexander Donski
- (Turkey) Tuncay Duran
- (Israel) Orel Kimhi
- (United Kingdom) Oscar Weightman

== Champions ==
=== Singles ===
- (South Africa) Philip Henning def. (Bulgaria) Alexander Donski 6–2, 3–6, 7–6^{(8–6)}.

=== Doubles ===
- (Turkey) Arda Azkara / (Turkey) Tuncay Duran def. (South Africa) Devin Badenhorst / (South Africa) Luc Koenig 6–2, 6–7^{(4–7)}, [10–7].
