= 2026 Centurion Challenger =

- Date: 25 – 31 May
- Edition: 1st
- Surface: Hard
- Location: Centurion, South Africa

Champions

Singles
- (United Kingdom) Giles Hussey

Doubles
- (France) Constantin Bittoun Kouzmine / (Latvia) Robert Strombachs
- Centurion Challenger

The 2026 Centurion Challenger, also known as the Rise Irene Open (for sponsorship reasons), was a professional tennis tournament played on hardcourts. It was the first edition of the tournament which was part of the 2026 ATP Challenger Tour. It took place in Centurion, South Africa between 25 and 31 May 2026.

== Singles main-draw entrants ==
=== Seeds ===
Country	Player	Rank^{1}	Seed
FRA	Harold Mayot	217	1
ITA	Stefano Napolitano	246	2
FRA	Calvin Hemery	276	3
FRA	Robin Bertrand	279	4
JPN	Akira Santillan	303	5
RSA	Philip Henning	315	6
CIV	Eliakim Coulibaly	319	7
TUR	Mert Alkaya	324	8

- ^{1} Rankings are as of 18 May 2026.

=== Other entrants ===
The following players received wildcards into the singles main draw:

- (South Africa) Devin Badenhorst
- (South Africa) Khololwam Montsi
- (Namibia) Connor Henry van Schalkwyk

The following players received entry from the qualifying draw:

- (South Africa) Alec Beckley
- (United States) Preston Brown
- (France) Guillaume Dalmasso
- (Israel) Orel Kimhi
- (South Africa) Luc Koenig
- (Australia) Stefan Vujic

== Champions ==
=== Singles ===
- (United Kingdom) Giles Hussey def. (Australia) Edward Winter 6–3, 6–3.

=== Doubles ===
- (France) Constantin Bittoun Kouzmine / (Latvia) Robert Strombachs def. (Turkey) Mert Alkaya / (Turkey) Arda Azkara 6–4, 6–4.
