= 2026 Centurion Challenger – Singles =

Singles
- 2026 Centurion Challenger

Final
- Champion: (United Kingdom) Giles Hussey
- Runner-up: (Australia) Edward Winter
- Score: 6–3, 6–3

Events
Singles	Doubles
- Centurion Challenger

This was the first edition of the tournament.

Giles Hussey won the title after defeating Edward Winter 6–3, 6–3 in the final.

== Seeds ==
1. (France) Harold Mayot (second round)
2. (Italy) Stefano Napolitano (semifinals)
3. (France) Calvin Hemery (second round)
4. (France) Robin Bertrand (first round)
5. (Japan) Akira Santillan (first round)
6. (South Africa) Philip Henning (quarterfinals)
7. (Ivory Coast) Eliakim Coulibaly (semifinals)
8. (Turkey) Mert Alkaya (first round)

== Draw ==
Key

- Q = Qualifier
- WC = Wild card
- LL = Lucky loser
- Alt = Alternate
- ITF = ITF entry
- PR = Protected ranking
- SR = Special ranking
- SE = Special exempt
- JE = Junior exempt
- JR = Junior Accelerator Programme entrant
- CO = College Accelerator Programme entrant
- NG = Next Gen Accelerator Program entrant
- w/o = Walkover
- r = Retired
- d = Defaulted

=== Finals ===
Semifinals
7	(Ivory Coast) Eliakim Coulibaly	6	4	5
(United Kingdom) Giles Hussey	2	6	7
(Australia) Edward Winter	6	1	7
2	(Italy) Stefano Napolitano	1	6	5

Final
(United Kingdom) Giles Hussey	6	6
(Australia) Edward Winter	3	3

=== Top half ===
First round
1	(France) H Mayot	6	6
(United Kingdom) Millen Hurrion	4	4
(Switzerland) L Castelnuovo	5	4
Semen Pankin	7	6
(Poland) F Peliwo	6	4	3
(Turkey) A Azkara	4	6	6
Q	(United States) Preston Brown	4	2
7	(Ivory Coast) E Coulibaly	6	6
3	(France) C Hemery	6	7^{7}
WC	(South Africa) Khololwam Montsi	4	6^{2}
(India) Sidharth Rawat	3	3
Q	(Israel) Orel Kimhi	6	6
(Germany) P Zahraj	2	7	4
(United Kingdom) G Hussey	6	5	6
WC	(South Africa) Devin Badenhorst	6	6
5	(Japan) A Santillan	3	1

Second round
1	(France) H Mayot	6	6^{3}	3
S Pankin	3	7^{7}	6
(Turkey) A Azkara	6^{4}	1
7	(Ivory Coast) E Coulibaly	7^{7}	6
3	(France) C Hemery	6^{5}	1
Q	(Israel) O Kimhi	7^{7}	6
(United Kingdom) G Hussey	7^{7}	7^{7}
WC	(South Africa) D Badenhorst	6^{3}	6^{1}

Quarterfinals
S Pankin	6	4	6^{2}
7	(Ivory Coast) E Coulibaly	3	6	7^{7}
Q	(Israel) O Kimhi	5	4
(United Kingdom) G Hussey	7	6

Semifinals
7	(Ivory Coast) E Coulibaly	6	4	5
(United Kingdom) G Hussey	2	6	7

=== Bottom half ===
First round
8	(Turkey) Mert Alkaya	3	6^{5}
(Japan) Y Takahashi	6	7^{7}
(India) M Sasikumar	4	0
(Australia) E Winter	6	6
(India) K Singh	6^{4}	1^{r}
Q	(France) Guillaume Dalmasso	7^{7}	4
(Latvia) R Strombachs	6	7
4	(France) R Bertrand	0	5
6	(South Africa) P Henning	6	6
WC	(Namibia) Connor Henry van Schalkwyk	3	3
Q	(South Africa) Luc Koenig	5	6	7
(Czech Republic) D Palán	7	3	5
Q	(South Africa) Alec Beckley	3	6	6
(France) C Bittoun Kouzmine	6	1	4
Q	(Australia) Stefan Vujic	2	4
2	(Italy) S Napolitano	6	6

Second round
(Japan) Y Takahashi	6	3	2
(Australia) E Winter	4	6	6
Q	(France) G Dalmasso	2	3
(Latvia) R Strombachs	6	6
6	(South Africa) P Henning	6	6
Q	(South Africa) L Koenig	2	2
Q	(South Africa) A Beckley	4	2
2	(Italy) S Napolitano	6	6

Quarterfinals
(Australia) E Winter	6	7^{7}
(Latvia) R Strombachs	1	6^{4}
6	(South Africa) P Henning	3	5
2	(Italy) S Napolitano	6	7

Semifinals
(Australia) E Winter	6	1	7
2	(Italy) S Napolitano	1	6	5
