= 2026 Centurion Challenger II – Doubles =

Doubles
- 2026 Centurion Challenger II

Final
- Champions: (Turkey) Arda Azkara (Turkey) Tuncay Duran
- Runners-up: (South Africa) Devin Badenhorst (South Africa) Luc Koenig
- Score: 6–2, 6–7^{(4–7)}, [10–7]

Events
Singles	Doubles
- Centurion Challenger

Constantin Bittoun Kouzmine and Robert Strombachs were the defending champions but lost in the semifinals to Devin Badenhorst and Luc Koenig.

Arda Azkara and Tuncay Duran won the title after defeating Badenhorst and Koenig 6–2, 6–7^{(4–7)}, [10–7] in the final.

== Seeds ==
1. (United Kingdom) Tom Hands / (Germany) Patrick Zahraj (first round)
2. (France) Constantin Bittoun Kouzmine / (Latvia) Robert Strombachs (semifinals)
3. (United States) Keshav Chopra / (South Africa) Kris van Wyk (first round)
4. (Switzerland) Luca Castelnuovo / (Chinese Taipei) Jeffrey Hsu (first round)

== Draw ==
Key

- Q = Qualifier
- WC = Wild card
- LL = Lucky loser
- Alt = Alternate
- ITF = ITF entry
- PR = Protected ranking
- SR = Special ranking
- SE = Special exempt
- JE = Junior exempt
- JR = Junior Accelerator Programme entrant
- CO = College Accelerator Programme entrant
- NG = Next Gen Accelerator Program entrant
- w/o = Walkover
- r = Retired
- d = Defaulted

First round
1	(United Kingdom) T Hands (Germany) P Zahraj	4	7	[7]
(Turkey) A Azkara (Turkey) T Duran	6	5	[10]
(Cyprus) E Neos; Semen Pankin	7	6
(South Africa) Vasilios Caripi (United Kingdom) G Hussey	5	3
4	(Switzerland) L Castelnuovo (Chinese Taipei) J Hsu	7	4	[6]
WC	(South Africa) Khololwam Montsi (Namibia) Connor Henry van Schalkwyk	5	6	[10]
(Poland) F Peliwo (United States) Michael Zhu	7	6
(India) Sidharth Rawat (India) Atharva Sharma	5	3
Alt	(South Africa) Thando Longwe-Smit (South Africa) Marc van der Merwe	3	6^{4}
(South Africa) P Henning (Zimbabwe) CJ Lock	6	7^{7}
WC	(South Africa) Devin Badenhorst (South Africa) Luc Koenig	6	5	[10]
3	(United States) K Chopra (South Africa) Kris van Wyk	1	7	[5]
(France) R Bertrand (France) Guillaume Dalmasso	6	7^{7}
(Japan) A Santillan (China) B Zheng	4	6^{4}
(South Africa) Alec Beckley (Bulgaria) A Donski	6^{0}	7^{7}	[3]
2	(France) C Bittoun Kouzmine (Latvia) R Strombachs	7^{7}	6^{4}	[10]

Quarterfinals
(Turkey) A Azkara (Turkey) T Duran	6	6
(Cyprus) E Neos; S Pankin	3	4
WC	(South Africa) K Montsi (Namibia) CH van Schalkwyk	7^{7}	6
(Poland) F Peliwo (United States) M Zhu	6^{4}	3
(South Africa) P Henning (Zimbabwe) CJ Lock	1	4
WC	(South Africa) D Badenhorst (South Africa) L Koenig	6	6
(France) R Bertrand (France) G Dalmasso	6^{2}	6^{5}
2	(France) C Bittoun Kouzmine (Latvia) R Strombachs	7^{7}	7^{7}

Semifinals
(Turkey) A Azkara (Turkey) T Duran	7^{7}	6
WC	(South Africa) K Montsi (Namibia) CH van Schalkwyk	6^{5}	4
WC	(South Africa) D Badenhorst (South Africa) L Koenig	6	7
2	(France) C Bittoun Kouzmine (Latvia) R Strombachs	3	5

Final
(Turkey) A Azkara (Turkey) T Duran	6	6^{4}	[10]
WC	(South Africa) D Badenhorst (South Africa) L Koenig	2	7^{7}	[7]
