= 2024 Istanbul Challenger – Singles =

Singles
- 2024 Istanbul Challenger

Final
- Champion: (Bosnia and Herzegovina) Damir Džumhur
- Runner-up: (Serbia) Hamad Medjedovic
- Score: 6–4, 6–2

Events
Singles	Doubles
- Istanbul Challenger

Damir Džumhur was the defending champion and successfully defended his title after defeating Hamad Medjedovic 6–4, 6–2 in the final.

== Seeds ==
1. (Bosnia and Herzegovina) Damir Džumhur (champion)
2. (Kazakhstan) Mikhail Kukushkin (first round)
3. (Netherlands) Jesper de Jong (semifinals)
4. (Croatia) Duje Ajduković (second round)
5. (Serbia) Hamad Medjedovic (final)
6. (Denmark) August Holmgren (first round)
7. (United States) Martin Damm (first round)
8. (Kazakhstan) Denis Yevseyev (first round, retired)

== Draw ==
Key

- Q = Qualifier
- WC = Wild card
- LL = Lucky loser
- Alt = Alternate
- ITF = ITF entry
- PR = Protected ranking
- SR = Special ranking
- SE = Special exempt
- JE = Junior exempt
- JR = Junior Accelerator Programme entrant
- CO = College Accelerator Programme entrant
- NG = Next Gen Accelerator Program entrant
- w/o = Walkover
- r = Retired
- d = Defaulted

=== Finals ===
Semifinals
1	(Bosnia and Herzegovina) Damir Džumhur	2	7	7^{9}
3	(Netherlands) Jesper de Jong	6	5	6^{7}
5	(Serbia) Hamad Medjedovic	6	6
(Spain) Martín Landaluce	4	2

Final
1	(Bosnia and Herzegovina) Damir Džumhur	6	6
5	(Serbia) Hamad Medjedovic	4	2

=== Top half ===
First round
1	(Bosnia and Herzegovina) D Džumhur	2
(Lithuania) R Berankis	2^{r}
Alt	(Croatia) D Prižmić	6^{2}	6	6
Q	(Turkey) C İlkel	7^{7}	3	2
(United Kingdom) J Pinnington Jones	4	6	6
(Tunisia) A Dougaz	6	3	0
Q	(Zimbabwe) B Lock	7^{7}	6
6	(Denmark) A Holmgren	6^{3}	1
3	(Netherlands) J de Jong	3	6	6
Alt	(Romania) GA Boitan	6	2	1
Q	E Agafonov	3	6	7^{7}
WC	(Turkey) Y Erel	6	3	6^{4}
Q	I Simakin	6	6
(Czech Republic) J Veselý	1	4
(Netherlands) G Brouwer	6	2
8	(Kazakhstan) D Yevseyev	4	1^{r}

Second round
1	(Bosnia and Herzegovina) D Džumhur	6	6
Alt	(Croatia) D Prižmić	2	2
(United Kingdom) J Pinnington Jones	4	6	6
Q	(Zimbabwe) B Lock	6	1	0
3	(Netherlands) J de Jong	4	6	6
Q	E Agafonov	6	1	4
Q	I Simakin	6	4	6
(Netherlands) G Brouwer	0	6	3

Quarterfinals
1	(Bosnia and Herzegovina) D Džumhur	6^{6}	6	4
(United Kingdom) J Pinnington Jones	7^{8}	1	0^{r}
3	(Netherlands) J de Jong	6^{3}	7	6
Q	I Simakin	7^{7}	5	3

Semifinals
1	(Bosnia and Herzegovina) D Džumhur	2	7	7^{9}
3	(Netherlands) J de Jong	6	5	6^{7}

=== Bottom half ===
First round
5	(Serbia) H Medjedovic	6	6
(Mexico) R Pacheco Méndez	2	4
(Romania) C Crețu	6^{5}	4
(Sweden) E Ymer	7^{7}	6
WC	(Turkey) T Duran	3	4
(Croatia) M Dodig	6	6
(India) R Ramanathan	4	3
4	(Croatia) D Ajduković	6	6
7	(United States) M Damm	3	1
Q	(Georgia (country)) S Purtseladze	6	6
Q	Maxim Zhukov	3	6	4
(Spain) M Landaluce	6	4	6
WC	(Turkey) K Kırcı	2	1
(Denmark) E Møller	6	6
(Belgium) M Geerts	4	6	7
2	(Kazakhstan) M Kukushkin	6	3	5

Second round
5	(Serbia) H Medjedovic	6	1
(Sweden) E Ymer	4	1^{r}
(Croatia) M Dodig	6	3	7^{7}
4	(Croatia) D Ajduković	3	6	6^{3}
Q	(Georgia (country)) S Purtseladze	4	3
(Spain) M Landaluce	6	6
(Denmark) E Møller	7^{8}	6
(Belgium) M Geerts	6^{6}	2

Quarterfinals
5	(Serbia) H Medjedovic	6	6
(Croatia) M Dodig	0	4
(Spain) M Landaluce	6	6
(Denmark) E Møller	2	4

Semifinals
5	(Serbia) H Medjedovic	6	6
(Spain) M Landaluce	4	2
