= 2026 Open Castilla y León – Doubles =

Doubles
- 2026 Open Castilla y León

Final
- Champions: (Spain) Alejo Sánchez Quílez (Spain) Benjamín Winter López
- Runners-up: (Turkey) Arda Azkara (Turkey) Yankı Erel
- Score: 2–6, 7–6^{(7–2)}, [10–7]

Events
Singles	Doubles
- Open Castilla y León

Matías Soto and Federico Zeballos were the defending champions but only Zeballos chose to defend his title, partnering Boris Arias. They lost in the first round to Arda Azkara and Yankı Erel.

Alejo Sánchez Quílez and Benjamín Winter López won the title after defeating Azkara and Erel 2–6, 7–6^{(7–2)}, [10–7] in the final.

== Seeds ==
1. (Bolivia) Boris Arias / (Bolivia) Federico Zeballos (first round)
2. (Spain) Bruno Pujol Navarro / (Spain) David Vega Hernández (semifinals)
3. (India) S D Prajwal Dev / (India) Nitin Kumar Sinha (first round)
4. (Spain) Alberto Barroso Campos / (Spain) Ignasi Forcano (first round)

== Draw ==
Key

- Q = Qualifier
- WC = Wild card
- LL = Lucky loser
- Alt = Alternate
- ITF = ITF entry
- PR = Protected ranking
- SR = Special ranking
- SE = Special exempt
- JE = Junior exempt
- JR = Junior Accelerator Programme entrant
- CO = College Accelerator Programme entrant
- NG = Next Gen Accelerator Program entrant
- w/o = Walkover
- r = Retired
- d = Defaulted

First round
1	(Bolivia) B Arias (Bolivia) F Zeballos	6	6^{2}	[4]
(Turkey) A Azkara (Turkey) Y Erel	4	7^{7}	[10]
(Uzbekistan) S Fomin (Spain) Iván Marrero Curbelo	7^{8}	6
WC	(Colombia) Samuel Heredia (Colombia) Miguel Tobón	6^{6}	3
3	(India) SDP Dev (India) Nitin Kumar Sinha	6^{5}	5
(India) A Kalyanpur (India) J Nedunchezhiyan	7^{7}	7
(France) C Bittoun Kouzmine (Tunisia) A Ouakaa	4	6	[14]
(Japan) Takuya Kumasaka (Japan) Koki Matsuda	6	4	[12]
WC	(Spain) Bernardo Munk Mesa (Republic of Ireland) Michael Wright	6^{4}	6	[10]
4	(Spain) A Barroso Campos (Spain) Ignasi Forcano	7^{7}	4	[8]
(Brazil) L Britto (Brazil) Natan Rodrigues	3	2
Alt	(Spain) John Echeverría (Italy) Massimo Giunta	6	6
(United States) K Smith (United States) Jamie Vance	3	6^{1}
2	(Spain) B Pujol Navarro (Spain) D Vega Hernández	6	7^{7}

Quarterfinals
(Turkey) A Azkara (Turkey) Y Erel	6	7^{7}
(Uzbekistan) S Fomin (Spain) I Marrero Curbelo	4	6^{3}
(India) A Kalyanpur (India) J Nedunchezhiyan	6	6
(France) C Bittoun Kouzmine (Tunisia) A Ouakaa	0	4
(Spain) A Sánchez Quílez (Spain) B Winter López	3	6	[12]
WC	(Spain) B Munk Mesa (Republic of Ireland) M Wright	6	2	[10]
Alt	(Spain) J Echeverría (Italy) M Giunta	4	4
2	(Spain) B Pujol Navarro (Spain) D Vega Hernández	6	6

Semifinals
(Turkey) A Azkara (Turkey) Y Erel	6	7
(India) A Kalyanpur (India) J Nedunchezhiyan	4	5
(Spain) A Sánchez Quílez (Spain) B Winter López	6^{0}	6	[10]
2	(Spain) B Pujol Navarro (Spain) D Vega Hernández	7^{7}	4	[7]

Final
(Turkey) A Azkara (Turkey) Y Erel	6	6^{2}	[7]
(Spain) A Sánchez Quílez (Spain) B Winter López	2	7^{7}	[10]
