= 2026 Open de Tenis Ciudad de Pozoblanco =

- Date: 13–19 July
- Edition: 20th
- Surface: Hard
- Location: Pozoblanco, Spain

Champions

Singles
- (Luxembourg) Chris Rodesch

Doubles
- (Spain) Alejo Sánchez Quílez / (Spain) Benjamín Winter López
- Open de Tenis Ciudad de Pozoblanco

The 2026 Open de Tenis Ciudad de Pozoblanco was a professional tennis tournament played on hardcourts. It was the 20th edition of the tournament, which was part of the 2026 ATP Challenger Tour. It took place in Pozoblanco, Spain between 13 and 19 July 2026.

== Singles main-draw entrants ==
=== Seeds ===
| Country | Player | Rank^{1} | Seed |
|---|---|---|---|
| LUX | Chris Rodesch | 173 | 1 |
| ARG | Juan Pablo Ficovich | 197 | 2 |
| FRA | Luka Pavlovic | 217 | 3 |
| FRA | Hugo Grenier | 223 | 4 |
| GBR | Oliver Crawford | 232 | 5 |
| FRA | Dan Added | 237 | 6 |
| CHN | Zhou Yi | 240 | 7 |
| GBR | Alastair Gray | 277 | 8 |

- ^{1} Rankings are as of 29 June 2026.

=== Other entrants ===
The following players received wildcards into the singles main draw:

- (Spain) Alejandro López Escribano
- (Spain) Pablo Pérez Navarro
- (Spain) Alejo Sánchez Quílez

The following player received entry into the singles main draw through the College Accelerator programme:

- (France) Paul Inchauspé

The following player received entry into the singles main draw through the Junior Accelerator programme:

- (Bulgaria) Ivan Ivanov

The following player received entry into the singles main draw through the Next Gen Accelerator programme:

- (Colombia) Miguel Tobón

The following players received entry into the singles main draw as alternates:

- (Thailand) Maximus Jones
- (Ukraine) Vadym Ursu
- (France) Cyril Vandermeersch

The following players received entry from the qualifying draw:

- (Spain) Izan Almazán Valiente
- Ilya Ivashka
- Pavel Lagutin
- (Malaysia) Mitsuki Wei Kang Leong
- (Tunisia) Aziz Ouakaa
- (Czech Republic) Dominik Palán

The following player received entry as a lucky loser:

- (Italy) Massimo Giunta

== Champions ==
=== Singles ===
- (Luxembourg) Chris Rodesch def. Ilya Ivashka 6–4, 2–6, 7–6^{(7–5)}.

=== Doubles ===
- (Spain) Alejo Sánchez Quílez / (Spain) Benjamín Winter López def. (Turkey) Arda Azkara / (Turkey) Yankı Erel 6–2, 7–5.
