= 2026 Open de Tenis Ciudad de Pozoblanco – Singles =

Singles
- 2026 Open de Tenis Ciudad de Pozoblanco

Final
- Champion: (Luxembourg) Chris Rodesch
- Runner-up: Ilya Ivashka
- Score: 6–4, 2–6, 7–6^{(7–5)}

Events
| Singles | Doubles |
- Open de Tenis Ciudad de Pozoblanco

Daniel Mérida was the defending champion but chose not to defend his title.

Chris Rodesch won the title after defeating Ilya Ivashka 6–4, 2–6, 7–6^{(7–5)} in the final.

== Seeds ==
1. (Luxembourg) Chris Rodesch (champion)
2. (Argentina) Juan Pablo Ficovich (first round)
3. (France) Luka Pavlovic (first round)
4. (France) Hugo Grenier (second round, retired)
5. (United Kingdom) Oliver Crawford (quarterfinals)
6. (France) Dan Added (quarterfinals)
7. (China) Zhou Yi (second round)
8. (United Kingdom) Alastair Gray (first round)

== Draw ==
Key

- Q = Qualifier
- WC = Wild card
- LL = Lucky loser
- Alt = Alternate
- ITF = ITF entry
- PR = Protected ranking
- SR = Special ranking
- SE = Special exempt
- JE = Junior exempt
- JR = Junior Accelerator Programme entrant
- CO = College Accelerator Programme entrant
- NG = Next Gen Accelerator Program entrant
- w/o = Walkover
- r = Retired
- d = Defaulted

=== Finals ===
Semifinals
1 | (Luxembourg) Chris Rodesch | 6 | 6
(Japan) Akira Santillan | 3 | 4
(Portugal) Tiago Pereira | 6^{5} | 6 | 6^{7}
Q | Ilya Ivashka | 7^{7} | 2 | 7^{9}

Final
1 | (Luxembourg) Chris Rodesch | 6 | 2 | 7^{7}
Q | Ilya Ivashka | 4 | 6 | 6^{5}

=== Top half ===
First round
1 | (Luxembourg) C Rodesch | 7^{11} | 4 | 6
(Turkey) Mert Alkaya | 6^{9} | 6 | 4
CO | (France) Paul Inchauspé | 3 | 6 | 6
(United Kingdom) H Stewart | 6 | 3 | 4
JR | (Bulgaria) I Ivanov | 7^{7} | 2 | 7
LL | (Italy) Massimo Giunta | 6^{5} | 6 | 5
WC | (Spain) Pablo Pérez Navarro | 4 | 3
5 | (United Kingdom) O Crawford | 6 | 6
4 | (France) H Grenier | 6 | 6
Alt | (France) Cyril Vandermeersch | 4 | 1
(Japan) A Santillan | 3 | 6 | 6
WC | (Spain) Alejandro López Escribano | 6 | 1 | 2
Alt | (Ukraine) Vadym Ursu | 4 | 5
Q | (Czech Republic) D Palán | 6 | 7
Q | (Spain) Izan Almazán Valiente | 7^{7} | 6
8 | (United Kingdom) A Gray | 6^{4} | 2

Second round
1 | (Luxembourg) C Rodesch | 6 | 7^{7}
CO | (France) P Inchauspé | 1 | 6^{4}
JR | (Bulgaria) I Ivanov | 0 | 6 | 5
5 | (United Kingdom) O Crawford | 6 | 4 | 7
4 | (France) H Grenier | 3 | 1^{r}
(Japan) A Santillan | 6 | 4
Q | (Czech Republic) D Palán | 5 | 3
Q | (Spain) I Almazán Valiente | 7 | 6

Quarterfinals
1 | (Luxembourg) C Rodesch | 5 | 7^{7} | 7
5 | (United Kingdom) O Crawford | 7 | 6^{3} | 5
(Japan) A Santillan | 7^{7} | 2 | 6
Q | (Spain) I Almazán Valiente | 6^{5} | 6 | 2

Semifinals
1 | (Luxembourg) C Rodesch | 6 | 6
(Japan) A Santillan | 3 | 4

=== Bottom half ===
First round
7 | (China) Y Zhou | 6 | 3 | 6
(United States) S Kozlov | 3 | 6 | 4
(Portugal) T Pereira | 6 | 6^{7} | 6
NG | (Colombia) Miguel Tobón | 4 | 7^{9} | 3
Q | Pavel Lagutin | 3 | 4
WC | (Spain) A Sánchez Quílez | 6 | 6
(Turkey) Y Erel | 7^{8} | 6
3 | (France) L Pavlovic | 6^{6} | 2
6 | (France) D Added | 6 | 7^{7}
Q | (Malaysia) Mitsuki Wei Kang Leong | 4 | 6^{5}
(Switzerland) L Castelnuovo | 5 | 4
(France) A Ghibaudo | 7 | 6
Alt | (Thailand) M Jones | 2 | 1^{r}
Q | I Ivashka | 6 | 3
Q | (Tunisia) A Ouakaa | 7^{7} | 4 | 6
2 | (Argentina) JP Ficovich | 6^{4} | 6 | 4

Second round
7 | (China) Y Zhou | 7 | 6^{5} | 3
(Portugal) T Pereira | 5 | 7^{7} | 6
WC | (Spain) A Sánchez Quílez | 6 | 6
(Turkey) Y Erel | 4 | 2
6 | (France) D Added | 7^{7} | 3 | 6
(France) A Ghibaudo | 6^{4} | 6 | 3
Q | I Ivashka | 6 | 6
Q | (Tunisia) A Ouakaa | 1 | 0

Quarterfinals
(Portugal) T Pereira | 6 | 7^{7}
WC | (Spain) A Sánchez Quílez | 4 | 6^{4}
6 | (France) D Added | 7^{7} | 1 | 3
Q | I Ivashka | 6^{4} | 6 | 6

Semifinals
(Portugal) T Pereira | 6^{5} | 6 | 6^{7}
Q | I Ivashka | 7^{7} | 2 | 7^{9}
