= 2026 Open de Tenis Ciudad de Pozoblanco – Doubles =

Doubles
- 2026 Open de Tenis Ciudad de Pozoblanco

Final
- Champions: (Spain) Alejo Sánchez Quílez (Spain) Benjamín Winter López
- Runners-up: (Turkey) Arda Azkara (Turkey) Yankı Erel
- Score: 6–2, 7–5

Events
Singles	Doubles
- Open de Tenis Ciudad de Pozoblanco

Iñaki Montes de la Torre and Sun Fajing were the defending champions but chose not to defend their title.

Alejo Sánchez Quílez and Benjamín Winter López won the title after defeating Arda Azkara and Yankı Erel 6–2, 7–5 in the final.

== Seeds ==
1. (Bolivia) Boris Arias / (Bolivia) Federico Zeballos (semifinals)
2. (Portugal) Tiago Pereira / (Spain) David Vega Hernández (quarterfinals)
3. (United Kingdom) Scott Duncan / (United Kingdom) James MacKinlay (first round)
4. (India) S D Prajwal Dev / (India) Nitin Kumar Sinha (quarterfinals)

== Draw ==
Key

- Q = Qualifier
- WC = Wild card
- LL = Lucky loser
- Alt = Alternate
- ITF = ITF entry
- PR = Protected ranking
- SR = Special ranking
- SE = Special exempt
- JE = Junior exempt
- JR = Junior Accelerator Programme entrant
- CO = College Accelerator Programme entrant
- NG = Next Gen Accelerator Program entrant
- w/o = Walkover
- r = Retired
- d = Defaulted

First round
1	(Bolivia) B Arias (Bolivia) F Zeballos	6	6
Alt	(Malaysia) Mitsuki Wei Kang Leong (France) NIcolas Tepmahc	2	4
(Spain) Sergio Callejón Hernando (Colombia) Miguel Tobón	6	3	[5]
WC	(Spain) Alejandro López Escribano (Spain) Pablo Pérez Navarro	2	6	[10]
3	(United Kingdom) S Duncan (United Kingdom) J MacKinlay	3	4
(Turkey) A Azkara (Turkey) Y Erel	6	6
Alt	(Colombia) Samuel Heredia (Colombia) Samuel Alejandro Linde Palacios	2	4
Alt	(Japan) Takuya Kumasaka (France) Cyril Vandermeersch	6	6
(Czech Republic) D Palán (Japan) A Santillan	2	4
(Spain) A Barroso Campos (Spain) Ignasi Forcano	6	6
Alt	(France) L Pavlovic (France) Paul Valsecchi	3	6^{4}
4	(India) SDP Dev (India) Nitin Kumar Sinha	6	7^{7}
(Switzerland) L Castelnuovo (Zimbabwe) CJ Lock	3	4
(Spain) A Sánchez Quílez (Spain) B Winter López	6	6
(France) C Bittoun Kouzmine (Tunisia) A Ouakaa	4	2
2	(Portugal) T Pereira (Spain) D Vega Hernández	6	6

Quarterfinals
1	(Bolivia) B Arias (Bolivia) F Zeballos	6	4	[10]
WC	(Spain) A López Escribano (Spain) P Pérez Navarro	1	6	[8]
(Turkey) A Azkara (Turkey) Y Erel	7^{11}	6
Alt	(Japan) T Kumasaka (France) C Vandermeersch	6^{9}	2
(Spain) A Barroso Campos (Spain) I Forcano	6	1	[10]
4	(India) SDP Dev (India) NK Sinha	4	6	[6]
(Spain) A Sánchez Quílez (Spain) B Winter López	6	4	[10]
2	(Portugal) T Pereira (Spain) D Vega Hernández	4	6	[5]

Semifinals
1	(Bolivia) B Arias (Bolivia) F Zeballos	3	4
(Turkey) A Azkara (Turkey) Y Erel	6	6
(Spain) A Barroso Campos (Spain) I Forcano	4	3
(Spain) A Sánchez Quílez (Spain) B Winter López	6	6

Final
(Turkey) A Azkara (Turkey) Y Erel	2	5
(Spain) A Sánchez Quílez (Spain) B Winter López	6	7
