= 2026 Open Castilla y León =

- Date: 20 – 26 July
- Edition: 40th
- Surface: Hard
- Location: Segovia, Spain

Champions

Singles
- (France) Luka Pavlovic

Doubles
- (Spain) Alejo Sánchez Quílez / (Spain) Benjamín Winter López
- Open Castilla y León

The 2026 Open Castilla y León Villa de El Espinar was a professional tennis tournament played on outdoor hard courts. It was the 40th edition of the tournament and part of the 2026 ATP Challenger Tour. It took place in El Espinar, Segovia, Spain between 20 and 26 July 2026.

== Singles main draw entrants ==
=== Seeds ===
Country	Player	Rank^{1}	Seed
~~LUX~~	~~Chris Rodesch~~	~~191~~	~~1~~
USA	Keegan Smith	204	2
GBR	Felix Gill	216	3
FRA	Hugo Grenier	221	4
ARG	Juan Pablo Ficovich	224	5
ESP	Alejandro Moro Cañas	227	6
GBR	Oliver Crawford	235	7
CHN	Zhou Yi	236	8

- ^{1} Rankings as of 13 July 2026.

=== Other entrants ===
The following players received wildcards into the singles main draw:

- (Spain) Mario González Fernández
- (Spain) Àlex Martí Pujolràs
- (Spain) Alejo Sánchez Quílez

The following player received entry into the singles main draw as a special exempt:

- Ilya Ivashka

The following player received entry into the singles main draw through the College Accelerator programme:

- (France) Paul Inchauspé

The following player received entry into the singles main draw through the Next Gen Accelerator programme:

- (Colombia) Miguel Tobón

The following player received entry into the singles main draw as an alternate:

- (Argentina) Gonzalo Villanueva

The following players received entry from the qualifying draw:

- (Italy) Massimo Giunta
- (Japan) Takuya Kumasaka
- (Spain) Iván Marrero Curbelo
- (Czech Republic) Dominik Palán
- (India) Digvijaypratap Singh
- (France) Cyril Vandermeersch

The following player received entry as a lucky loser:

- (France) Constantin Bittoun Kouzmine

== Champions ==
=== Singles ===
- (France) Luka Pavlovic def. (France) Matteo Martineau 6–4, 3–6, 6–1.

=== Doubles ===
- (Spain) Alejo Sánchez Quílez / (Spain) Benjamín Winter López def. (Turkey) Arda Azkara / (Turkey) Yankı Erel 2–6, 7–6^{(7–2)}, [10–7].
