= 2026 Open Castilla y León – Singles =

Singles
- 2026 Open Castilla y León

Final
- Champion: (France) Luka Pavlovic
- Runner-up: (France) Matteo Martineau
- Score: 6–4, 3–6, 6–1

Events
Singles	Doubles
- Open Castilla y León

George Loffhagen was the defending champion but chose not to defend his title.

Luka Pavlovic won the title after defeating Matteo Martineau 6–4, 3–6, 6–1 in the final.

== Seeds ==
1. (Luxembourg) Chris Rodesch (withdrew)
2. (United States) Keegan Smith (semifinals)
3. (Argentina) Juan Pablo Ficovich (first round)
4. (Spain) Alejandro Moro Cañas (quarterfinals)
5. (United Kingdom) Oliver Crawford (semifinals)
6. (China) Zhou Yi (second round)
7. (France) Dan Added (first round)
8. (United Kingdom) Max Basing (first round)

== Draw ==
Key

- Q = Qualifier
- WC = Wild card
- LL = Lucky loser
- Alt = Alternate
- ITF = ITF entry
- PR = Protected ranking
- SR = Special ranking
- SE = Special exempt
- JE = Junior exempt
- JR = Junior Accelerator Programme entrant
- CO = College Accelerator Programme entrant
- NG = Next Gen Accelerator Program entrant
- w/o = Walkover
- r = Retired
- d = Defaulted

=== Finals ===
Semifinals
(France) Matteo Martineau	6	5	7^{7}
5	(United Kingdom) Oliver Crawford	3	7	6^{4}
(France) Luka Pavlovic	6	7^{7}
2	(United States) Keegan Smith	2	6^{3}

Final
(France) Matteo Martineau	4	6	1
(France) Luka Pavlovic	6	3	6

=== Top half ===
First round
LL	(France) C Bittoun Kouzmine	4	3
(France) M Martineau	6	6
Alt	(Argentina) G Villanueva	6	6
SE	I Ivashka	3	3
(Turkey) Y Erel	6	3	7^{10}
(Uzbekistan) S Fomin	2	6	6^{8}
Q	(Czech Republic) D Palán	3	6	6
8	(United Kingdom) M Basing	6	3	4
4	(Spain) A Moro Cañas	7^{7}	5	6
Q	(Italy) Massimo Giunta	6^{4}	7	4
Q	(Spain) Iván Marrero Curbelo	6	6
(Argentina) F Mena	4	3
(France) A Ghibaudo	3	3
WC	(Spain) A Sánchez Quílez	6	6
WC	(Spain) Àlex Martí Pujolràs	3	4
5	(United Kingdom) O Crawford	6	6

Second round
(France) M Martineau	6	7^{8}
Alt	(Argentina) G Villanueva	3	6^{6}
(Turkey) Y Erel	3	7^{13}	6
Q	(Czech Republic) D Palán	6	6^{11}	2
4	(Spain) A Moro Cañas	6	6
Q	(Spain) I Marrero Curbelo	3	4
WC	(Spain) A Sánchez Quílez	4	6^{6}
5	(United Kingdom) O Crawford	6	7^{8}

Quarterfinals
(France) M Martineau	6	6
(Turkey) Y Erel	4	4
4	(Spain) A Moro Cañas	4	0
5	(United Kingdom) O Crawford	6	6

Semifinals
(France) M Martineau	6	5	7^{7}
5	(United Kingdom) O Crawford	3	7	6^{4}

=== Bottom half ===
First round
6	(China) Y Zhou	6	6
(Belgium) M Geerts	1	4
Q	(Japan) Takuya Kumasaka	6	1	2
(France) L Pavlovic	3	6	6
(United Kingdom) A Gray	6	2	3
(Japan) A Santillan	2	6	6
(Turkey) Mert Alkaya	6	6
3	(Argentina) JP Ficovich	3	4
7	(France) D Added	2	1
(France) F Bax	6	6
CO	(France) Paul Inchauspé	6	3
Q	(France) Cyril Vandermeersch	1	0^{r}
WC	(Spain) Mario González Fernández	6^{3}	6	7^{7}
NG	(Colombia) Miguel Tobón	7^{7}	3	6^{2}
Q	(India) Digvijaypratap Singh	6^{4}	4
2	(United States) K Smith	7^{7}	6

Second round
6	(China) Y Zhou	4	6^{6}
(France) L Pavlovic	6	7^{8}
(Japan) A Santillan	2	2
(Turkey) M Alkaya	6	6
(France) F Bax	5	3
CO	(France) P Inchauspé	7	6
WC	(Spain) M González Fernández	4	2
2	(United States) K Smith	6	6

Quarterfinals
(France) L Pavlovic	6	6
(Turkey) M Alkaya	1	2
CO	(France) P Inchauspé	7^{7}	6^{2}	6^{4}
2	(United States) K Smith	6^{4}	7^{7}	7^{7}

Semifinals
(France) L Pavlovic	6	7^{7}
2	(United States) K Smith	2	6^{3}
