= 2024 Istanbul Challenger =

- Date: 2–8 September
- Edition: 38th
- Surface: Hard
- Location: Istanbul, Turkey

Champions

Singles
- (Bosnia and Herzegovina) Damir Džumhur

Doubles
- (Georgia (country)) Aleksandre Bakshi / (Turkey) Yankı Erel
- Istanbul Challenger

The 2024 QNB Finansbank Istanbul Challenger 76. TED Open International Tennis Tournament was a professional tennis tournament played on hardcourts. It was the 38th edition of the tournament which was part of the 2024 ATP Challenger Tour. It took place in Istanbul, Turkey between 2 and 8 September 2024.

== Singles main-draw entrants ==
=== Seeds ===
Country	Player	Rank^{1}	Seed
BIH	Damir Džumhur	82	1
KAZ	Mikhail Kukushkin	117	2
NED	Jesper de Jong	128	3
CRO	Duje Ajduković	134	4
SRB	Hamad Medjedovic	137	5
DEN	August Holmgren	163	6
USA	Martin Damm	205	7
KAZ	Denis Yevseyev	207	8

- ^{1} Rankings are as of 26 August 2024.

=== Other entrants ===
The following players received wildcards into the singles main draw:

- (Turkey) Tuncay Duran
- (Turkey) Yankı Erel
- (Turkey) Koray Kırcı

The following players received entry into the singles main draw as alternates:

- (Romania) Gabi Adrian Boitan
- (Croatia) Dino Prižmić

The following players received entry from the qualifying draw:

- Egor Agafonov
- (Turkey) Cem İlkel
- (Zimbabwe) Benjamin Lock
- (Georgia (country)) Saba Purtseladze
- Ilia Simakin
- Maxim Zhukov

== Champions ==
=== Singles ===
- (Bosnia and Herzegovina) Damir Džumhur def. (Serbia) Hamad Medjedovic 6–4, 6–2.

=== Doubles ===
- (Georgia (country)) Aleksandre Bakshi / (Turkey) Yankı Erel def. (Denmark) August Holmgren / (Denmark) Johannes Ingildsen 7–6^{(7–4)}, 7–5.
