= 2024 Istanbul Challenger – Doubles =

Doubles
- 2024 Istanbul Challenger

Final
- Champions: (Georgia (country)) Aleksandre Bakshi (Turkey) Yankı Erel
- Runners-up: (Denmark) August Holmgren (Denmark) Johannes Ingildsen
- Score: 7–6^{(7–4)}, 7–5

Events
Singles	Doubles
- Istanbul Challenger

Luke Johnson and Skander Mansouri were the defending champions but chose not to defend their title.

Aleksandre Bakshi and Yankı Erel won the title after defeating August Holmgren and Johannes Ingildsen 7–6^{(7–4)}, 7–5 in the final.

== Seeds ==
1. (United States) Vasil Kirkov / (Greece) Petros Tsitsipas (first round)
2. (Mexico) Hans Hach Verdugo / (Mexico) Miguel Ángel Reyes-Varela (first round)
3. Ivan Liutarevich / (United Kingdom) Marcus Willis (semifinals)
4. (United Kingdom) Joshua Paris / (India) Ramkumar Ramanathan (first round)

== Draw ==
Key

- Q = Qualifier
- WC = Wild card
- LL = Lucky loser
- Alt = Alternate
- ITF = ITF entry
- PR = Protected ranking
- SR = Special ranking
- SE = Special exempt
- JE = Junior exempt
- JR = Junior Accelerator Programme entrant
- CO = College Accelerator Programme entrant
- NG = Next Gen Accelerator Program entrant
- w/o = Walkover
- r = Retired
- d = Defaulted

=== Draw ===
First round
1	(United States) V Kirkov (Greece) Pe Tsitsipas	5	3
(Denmark) A Holmgren (Denmark) J Ingildsen	7	6
Alt	Denis Klok (Moldova) I Snițari	3	6	[7]
PR	(Netherlands) G Brouwer (Netherlands) M Hermans	6	2	[10]
3	I Liutarevich (United Kingdom) M Willis	6	6
(Croatia) M Dodig (Mexico) R Pacheco Méndez	2	1
(United States) M Damm (Czech Republic) M Vocel	7^{8}	7
WC	(Turkey) C İlkel (Turkey) S Mert Özdemir	6^{6}	5
PR	(Belgium) M Geerts (India) D Sharan	6	6^{6}	[10]
(Romania) C Crețu (Romania) B Pavel	4	7^{8}	[5]
E Agafonov; I Simakin	6	6
4	(United Kingdom) J Paris (India) R Ramanathan	1	2
(Zimbabwe) B Lock (Zimbabwe) CJ Lock	4	6	[7]
(United States) A Ayeni (Georgia (country)) S Purtseladze	6	3	[10]
WC	(Georgia (country)) A Bakshi (Turkey) Y Erel	6	6
2	(Mexico) H Hach Verdugo (Mexico) MÁ Reyes-Varela	4	2

Quarterfinals
(Denmark) A Holmgren (Denmark) J Ingildsen	6	6
PR	(Netherlands) G Brouwer (Netherlands) M Hermans	4	3
3	I Liutarevich (United Kingdom) M Willis	7^{8}	6
(United States) M Damm (Czech Republic) M Vocel	6^{6}	3
PR	(Belgium) M Geerts (India) D Sharan	6^{5}	0
E Agafonov; I Simakin	7^{7}	6
(United States) A Ayeni (Georgia (country)) S Purtseladze	3	1
WC	(Georgia (country)) A Bakshi (Turkey) Y Erel	6	6

Semifinals
(Denmark) A Holmgren (Denmark) J Ingildsen	6	3	[11]
3	I Liutarevich (United Kingdom) M Willis	3	6	[9]
E Agafonov; I Simakin	6	4	[8]
WC	(Georgia (country)) A Bakshi (Turkey) Y Erel	3	6	[10]

Final
(Denmark) A Holmgren (Denmark) J Ingildsen	6^{4}	5
WC	(Georgia (country)) A Bakshi (Turkey) Y Erel	7^{7}	7
