= Centurion Challenger =

- 2026 Centurion Challenger

ATP Challenger Tour
- Location: Centurion, South Africa
- Venue: Irene Country Club
- Category: ATP Challenger Tour
- Surface: Hard

The Centurion Challenger is a professional tennis tournament played on hardcourts. It is currently part of the ATP Challenger Tour. It was first held in Centurion, South Africa in 2026, where it was originally scheduled to be held in four editions but was later decreased to two as the latter two editions of the tournament were canceled.

== Past finals ==
=== Singles ===
Year	Champion	Runner-up	Score
2026 (1)	(United Kingdom) Giles Hussey	(Australia) Edward Winter	6–3, 6–3
2026 (2)	(South Africa) Philip Henning	(Bulgaria) Alexander Donski	6–2, 3–6, 7–6^{(8–6)}

=== Doubles ===
Year	Champions	Runners-up	Score
2026 (1)	(France) Constantin Bittoun Kouzmine (Latvia) Robert Strombachs	(Turkey) Mert Alkaya (Turkey) Arda Azkara	6–4, 6–4
2026 (2)	(Turkey) Arda Azkara (Turkey) Tuncay Duran	(South Africa) Devin Badenhorst (South Africa) Luc Koenig	6–2, 6–7^{(4–7)}, [10–7]
