= Yankı Erel =

Turkish tennis player (born 2000)

- Country (sports): Turkey
- Born: 25 September 2000 (age 26) Tekirdağ, Turkey
- Height: 1.78 m (5 ft 10 in)
- Plays: Left-handed (two-handed backhand)
- Coach: Anıl Yüksel
- Prize money: US $177,546

Singles
- Career record: 3–3 (at ATP Tour level, Grand Slam level, and in Davis Cup)
- Career titles: 0
- Highest ranking: No. 280 (3 August 2026)
- Current ranking: No. 296 (9 November 2026)

Grand Slam singles results
- US Open Junior: 1R (2018)

Doubles
- Career record: 0–4 (at ATP Tour level, Grand Slam level, and in Davis Cup)
- Career titles: 1 Challenger
- Highest ranking: No. 405 (23 December 2024)
- Current ranking: No. 456 (9 November 2026)

Grand Slam doubles results
- Wimbledon Junior: W (2018)
- Last updated on: 9 November 2026.

Yankı Erel (born 25 September 2000) is a Turkish tennis player. He has a career high ATP singles ranking of world No. 280 achieved on 3 August 2026 and a doubles ranking of No. 405 achieved on 23 December 2024.

Erel won the 2018 Wimbledon Championships – Boys' doubles title. On the juniors tour, Erel has a career high ITF junior combined ranking of 16, achieved on 16 July 2018.

== Junior Grand Slam finals ==
=== Doubles: 1 (1 title) ===
Result	Year	Tournament	Surface	Partner	Opponents	Score
Win	2018	(United Kingdom) Wimbledon	Grass	(Finland) Otto Virtanen	(Colombia) Nicolás Mejía (Czech Republic) Ondřej Štyler	7–6^{(7–5)}, 6–4

== ATP Challenger and ITF Tour finals ==
=== Singles: 18 (13–5) ===
Legend (singles) ATP Challenger Tour (0–0) Futures/ITF World Tennis Tour (13–5)	Finals by surface Hard (13–5) Clay (0–0) Grass (0–0) Carpet (0–0)

Result	W–L	Date	Tournament	Tier	Surface	Opponent	Score
Win	1–0	Mar 2021	M15 Kazan, Russia	World Tennis Tour	Hard	(Russia) Alexey Zakharov	6–3, 3–0 ret.
Win	2–0	Apr 2021	M15 Saint Petersburg, Russia	World Tennis Tour	Hard	(Russia) Savriyan Danilov	6–1, 6–4
Win	3–0	May 2021	M15 Monastir, Tunisia	World Tennis Tour	Hard	(Argentina) Santiago Rodríguez Taverna	4–6, 6–1, 6–2
Win	4–0	Nov 2022	M15 Al Zahra, Kuwait	World Tennis Tour	Hard	(Estonia) Kristjan Tamm	6–3, 1–6, 6–3
Win	5–0	Apr 2023	M25 Jakarta, Indonesia	World Tennis Tour	Hard	(Australia) Brandon Walkin	6–3, 6–0
Win	6–0	Jun 2023	M25 Jakarta, Indonesia	World Tennis Tour	Hard	(Japan) Hiroki Moriya	6–3, 4–6, 6–2
Win	7–0	Dec 2023	M15 Al Zahra, Kuwait	World Tennis Tour	Hard	(Netherlands) Sidane Pontjodikromo	6–3, 6–2
Loss	7–1	Jan 2024	M15 Doha, Qatar	World Tennis Tour	Hard	(Uzbekistan) Khumoyun Sultanov	6–7^{(3–7)}, 4–6
Win	8–1	Dec 2024	M15 Monastir, Tunisia	World Tennis Tour	Hard	(Italy) Luca Potenza	6–0, 6–4
Loss	8–2	Jun 2025	M15 Monastir, Tunisia	World Tennis Tour	Hard	(Italy) Leonardo Rossi	6–2, 6–7^{(5–7)}, 1–6
Loss	8–3	Aug 2025	M25 Bali, Indonesia	World Tennis Tour	Hard	(France) Arthur Géa	3–6, 6–3, 5–7
Win	9–3	Aug 2025	M25 Taipei, Chinese Taipei	World Tennis Tour	Hard	(Japan) Yuki Mochizuki	6–2, 6–4
Loss	9–4	Sep 2025	M25 Bali, Indonesia	World Tennis Tour	Hard	(United Kingdom) Max Basing	6–4, 2–5 ret.
Loss	9–5	Oct 2025	M15 Monastir, Tunisia	World Tennis Tour	Hard	(Italy) Michele Ribecai	6–5 ret.
Win	10–5	Feb 2026	M15 Monastir, Tunisia	World Tennis Tour	Hard	(Italy) Daniele Rapagnetta	1–6, 6–0, 6–4
Win	11–5	Apr 2026	M25 Monastir, Tunisia	World Tennis Tour	Hard	(France) Robin Bertrand	6–1, 6–1
Win	12–5	May 2026	M15 Kutaisi, Georgia	World Tennis Tour	Hard	(Ukraine) Vadym Ursu	6–1, 6–4
Win	13–5	Jul 2026	M25 Roda de Berà, Spain	World Tennis Tour	Hard	(United Kingdom) Oliver Crawford	6–0, 6–2

=== Doubles: 9 (4 titles, 5 runner-ups) ===
Legend (doubles) ATP Challenger Tour (1–2) Futures/ITF World Tennis Tour (3–3)	Finals by surface Hard (4–4) Clay (0–1) Grass (0–0) Carpet (0–0)

Result	W–L	Date	Tournament	Tier	Surface	Partner	Opponents	Score
Win	1–0	Dec 2016	Turkey F51, Antalya	Futures	Hard	(Turkey) Cem İlkel	(Ukraine) Olexiy Kolisnyk (Ukraine) Oleg Prihodko	6–4, 6–3
Loss	1–1	Dec 2020	M15 Antalya, Turkey	World Tennis Tour	Clay	(Turkey) Cengiz Aksu	(Uzbekistan) Sanjar Fayziev (Uzbekistan) Sergey Fomin	3–6, 4–6
Loss	1–2	Mar 2022	M15 Monastir, Tunisia	World Tennis Tour	Hard	(Ivory Coast) Eliakim Coulibaly	(France) Robin Bertrand (Netherlands) Jarno Jans	4–6, 6–1, [6–10]
Win	2–2	Jan 2024	M25 Doha, Qatar	World Tennis Tour	Hard	(Turkey) Ergi Kırkın	(Japan) Masamichi Imamura (Japan) Naoki Tajima	4–6, 6–3, [10–2]
Win	3–2	Sep 2024	Istanbul, Turkey	Challenger	Hard	(Georgia (country)) Aleksandre Bakshi	(Denmark) August Holmgren (Denmark) Johannes Ingildsen	7–6^{(7–4)}, 7–5
Win	4–2	Oct 2024	M15 Kayseri, Turkey	World Tennis Tour	Hard	(Turkey) Tuncay Duran	(Colombia) Samuel Heredia (Colombia) Johan Alexander Rodríguez	3–6, 7–6^{(7–3)}, [10–7]
Loss	4–3	Nov 2024	M25 Monastir, Tunisia	World Tennis Tour	Hard	(Croatia) Admir Kalender	(Slovakia) Lukáš Pokorný; Marat Sharipov	Walkover
Loss	4–4	Jul 2026	Pozoblanco, Spain	Challenger	Hard	(Turkey) Arda Azkara	(Spain) Alejo Sánchez Quílez (Spain) Benjamín Winter López	2–6, 5–7
Loss	4–5	Jul 2026	Segovia, Spain	Challenger	Hard	(Turkey) Arda Azkara	(Spain) Alejo Sánchez Quílez (Spain) Benjamín Winter López	6–2, 6–7^{(2–7)}, [7–10]
