= Edward Winter (tennis) =

Australian tennis player (born 2004)

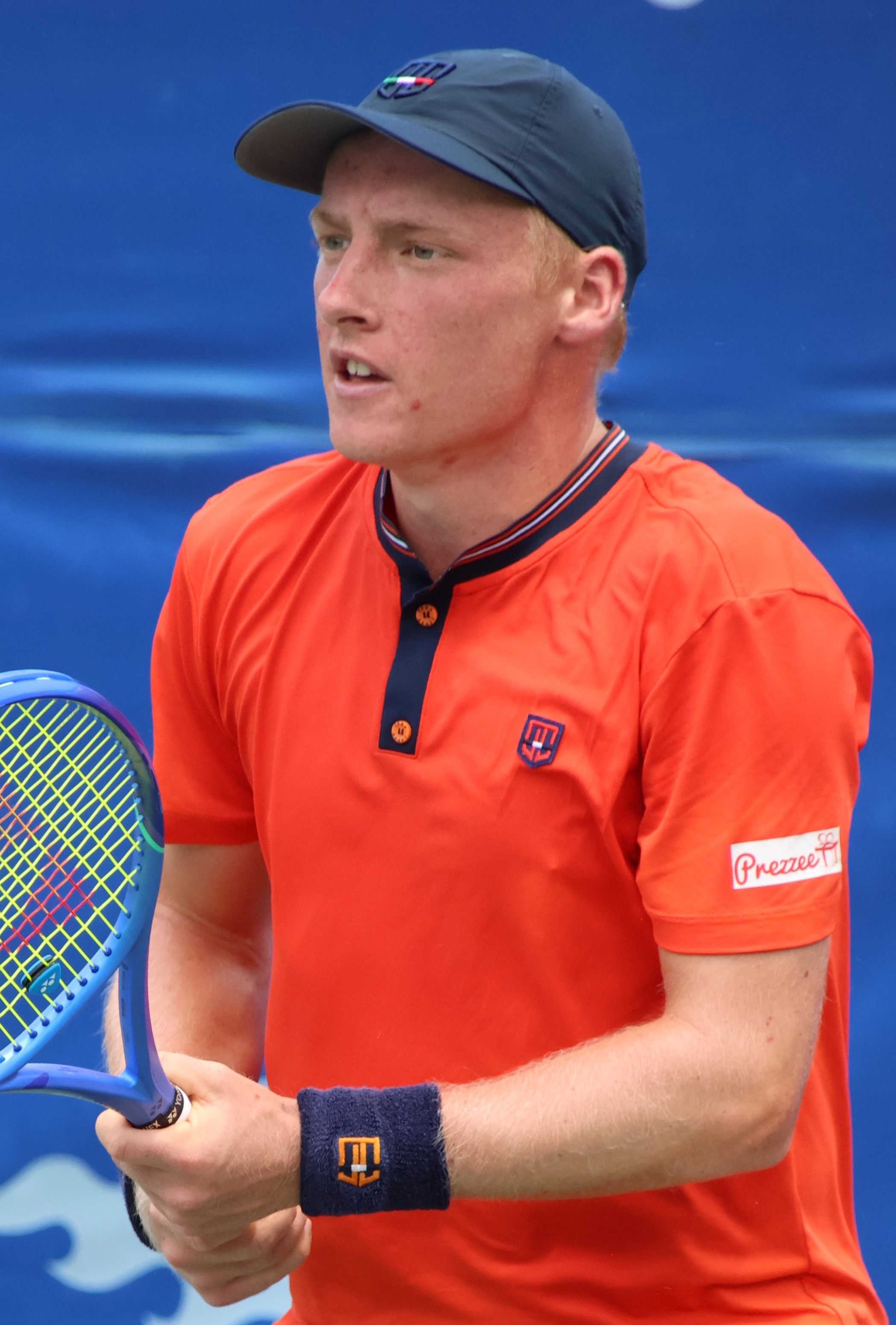
- Winter in 2026
- Country (sports): Australia
- Born: 15 September 2004 (age 22) Adelaide, Australia
- Height: 1.78 m (5 ft 10 in)
- Plays: Right-handed (two-handed backhand)
- Coach: Stephen Huss
- Prize money: US $249,903

Singles
- Career record: 1–1 (at ATP Tour level, Grand Slam level, and in Davis Cup)
- Career titles: 3 ITF
- Highest ranking: No. 338 (21 September 2026)
- Current ranking: No. 338 (21 September 2026)

Grand Slam singles results
- Australian Open: Q2 (2022, 2024)
- Australian Open Junior: 2R (2022)
- French Open Junior: Q2 (2022)
- Wimbledon Junior: 2R (2022)
- US Open Junior: 1R (2022)

Doubles
- Career record: 3–3 (at ATP Tour level, Grand Slam level, and in Davis Cup)
- Career titles: 6 ITF
- Highest ranking: No. 275 (29 January 2024)

Grand Slam doubles results
- Australian Open: 2R (2024)
- Australian Open Junior: 2R (2022)
- Wimbledon Junior: QF (2022)
- US Open Junior: 1R (2022)

Grand Slam mixed doubles results
- Australian Open: 1R (2025)
- Last updated on: 21 September 2026.

Edward Winter (born 15 September 2004) is an Australian tennis player. Winter has a career high ATP singles ranking of No. 338 achieved on 21 September 2026 and a career high ATP doubles ranking of No. 275 achieved on 29 January 2024.

Winter made his ATP main draw debut at the 2022 Adelaide International 1 after receiving a wildcard into the doubles main draw with Aleksandar Vukic.

== Career ==
=== 2021: ITF Debut ===
Winter made his debut at the M15 Monastir in November 2021, reaching the quarterfinals in doubles and the second round in singles. Winter ended 2021 with a singles rank of No. 1767 and a doubles ranking of No. 2188.

=== 2022: ATP doubles debut ===
In January 2022, Winter made his ATP main draw debut at the 2022 Adelaide International 1 after receiving a wildcard into the doubles main draw with Aleksandar Vukic. The duo reached the quarterfinals. The following week, Winter defeated Gilles Simon a former world No.6 and two-time Grand Slam quarterfinalist in three sets in the first round of Australian Open qualifying. Winter lost in the second round.

== Performance timeline ==
Key
W	F	SF	QF	#R	RR	Q#	DNQ	A	NH

(W) winner; (F) finalist; (SF) semifinalist; (QF) quarterfinalist; (#R) rounds 4, 3, 2, 1; (RR) round-robin stage; (Q#) qualification round; (DNQ) did not qualify; (A) absent; (NH) not held; (SR) strike rate (events won / competed); (W–L) win–loss record.

=== Singles ===
Tournament!	2022	2023	2024	2025	2026	SR	W–L	Win %
Grand Slam tournaments
Australian Open	Q2	Q1	Q2	Q1	Q1	0 / 0	0–0	–
French Open	A	A	A	A		0 / 0	0–0	–
Wimbledon	A	A	A	A		0 / 0	0–0	–
US Open	A	A	A	A		0 / 0	0–0	–
Win–loss	0–0	0–0	0–0	0–0	0–0	0 / 0	0–0	–
ATP Masters 1000
Indian Wells Masters	A	A	A	A		0 / 0	0–0	–
Miami Open	A	A	A	A		0 / 0	0–0	–
Monte Carlo Masters	A	A	A	A		0 / 0	0–0	–
Madrid Open	A	A	A	A		0 / 0	0-0	–
Italian Open	A	A	A	A		0 / 0	0–0	–
Canadian Open	A	A	A	A		0 / 0	0–0	–
Cincinnati Masters	A	A	A	A		0 / 0	0–0	–
Shanghai Masters	NH	A	A	A		0 / 0	0–0	–
Paris Masters	A	A	A	A		0 / 0	0–0	–
Win–loss	0–0	0–0	0–0	0–0	0–0	0 / 0	0–0	–

== ATP Challenger and ITF World Tennis Tour finals ==
=== Singles: 5 (3 titles, 2 runner-ups) ===
Legend ATP Challenger Tour (0–2) ITF World Tennis Tour (3–0)	Finals by surface Hard (3–2) Clay (0–0) Grass (0–0) Carpet (0–0)

Result	W–L	Date	Tournament	Tier	Surface	Opponent	Score
Loss	0–1	Oct 2025	Fairfield Challenger, US	Challenger	Hard	(Japan) Jay Dylan Friend	7–6^{(7–3)}, 3–6, 2–6
Loss	0–2	May 2026	Centurion Challenger, South Africa	Challenger	Hard	(United Kingdom) Giles Hussey	3–6, 3–6
Win	1–0	Nov 2022	M25 Traralgon, Australia	WTT	Hard	(Australia) Tristan Schoolkate	6–4, 6–2
Win	2–0	Jun 2024	M15 Daegu, South Korea	WTT	Hard	(United States) Ezekiel Clark	6–3, 3–6, 7–5
Win	3–0	May 2025	M15 Heraklion, Greece	WTT	Hard	(France) Antoine Ghibaudo	6–2, 6–2

=== Doubles: 9 (6 titles, 3 runner-ups) ===
Legend ATP Challenger Tour (0–1) ITF World Tennis Tour (6–2)	Finals by surface Hard (5–2) Clay (1–0) Grass (0–1) Carpet (0–0)

Result	W–L	Date	Tournament	Tier	Surface	Partner	Opponents	Score
Loss	0–1	Aug 2024	Jinan Open, China	Challenger	Hard	(Japan) Rio Noguchi	(South Korea) Chung Yun-seong (Japan) Yuta Shimizu	3–6, 7–6^{(7–5)}, [6–10]
Win	1–0	Sep 2022	M15 Champaign, US	WTT	Hard	(United States) Hunter Heck	(Canada) Peter Kuszynski (Germany) Jannik Opitz	6–1, 7–6^{(7–2)}
Loss	1–1	Feb 2023	M25 Swan Hill, Australia	WTT	Grass	(Australia) Blake Bayldon	(Australia) Luke Saville (Australia) Tristan Schoolkate	3–6, 6–7^{(3–7)}
Win	2–1	Mar 2023	M25 Calabasas, US	WTT	Hard	(United States) Cooper Williams	(United States) Rohan Murali (United States) Elijah Strode	6–2, 6–3
Win	3–1	Apr 2023	M15 Tacarigua, Trinidad and Tobago	WTT	Hard	(New Zealand) Finn Reynolds	(United States) Ezekiel Clark (Republic of Ireland) Osgar O'Hoisin	4–6, 7–6^{(7–4)}, [10–6]
Win	4–1	Nov 2023	M25 Austin, US	WTT	Hard	(United States) Learner Tien	(United States) Sebastian Gorzny (United States) Brayden Michna	4–6, 6–3, [10–2]
Win	5–1	Jun 2024	M15 Anseong, South Korea	WTT	Hard	(Japan) Kenta Miyoshi	(Australia) Ethan Cook (Japan) Naoki Tajima	6–3, 5–7, [10–6]
Win	6–1	Jul 2024	M15 Umag, Croatia	WTT	Clay	(Germany) Maximilian Homberg	(France) Lucas Bouquet (France) Corentin Denolly	7–6^{(7–4)}, 6–4
Loss	6–2	Jun 2025	M25 Heraklion, Greece	WTT	Hard	(Australia) Hugh Winter	(Australia) Ethan Cook (Portugal) Diogo Marques	2–6, 0–6
