= Tuncay Duran =

Turkish tennis player (born 2004)

- Country (sports): Turkey
- Born: 2 June 2004 (age 22) Istanbul, Turkey
- Height: 1.91 m (6 ft 3 in)
- Plays: Right-handed (one-handed backhand)
- Coach: Bulent Duran
- Prize money: US $44,933

Singles
- Career record: 0–0 (at ATP Tour level, Grand Slam level, and in Davis Cup)
- Career titles: 2 ITF
- Highest ranking: No. 540 (16 November 2026)
- Current ranking: No. 540 (16 November 2026)

Doubles
- Career record: 0–0 (at ATP Tour level, Grand Slam level, and in Davis Cup)
- Career titles: 1 Challenger, 3 ITF
- Highest ranking: No. 465 (19 October 2026)
- Current ranking: No. 467 (16 November 2026)
Medal record
Representing Turkey
World University Games
Silver medal – second place	2025 Rhine-Ruhr	Doubles
Bronze medal – third place	2025 Rhine-Ruhr	Team event
- Last updated on: 16 November 2026.

Tuncay Duran (born 2 June 2004) is a Turkish tennis player. Duran has a career high ATP singles ranking of No. 540 achieved on 16 November 2026 and a career high ATP doubles ranking of No. 465 achieved on 19 October 2026.

Duran has won one ATP Challenger doubles title at the 2026 Centurion Challenger II with Arda Azkara.
