= Philip Henning =

South African tennis player (born 2000)

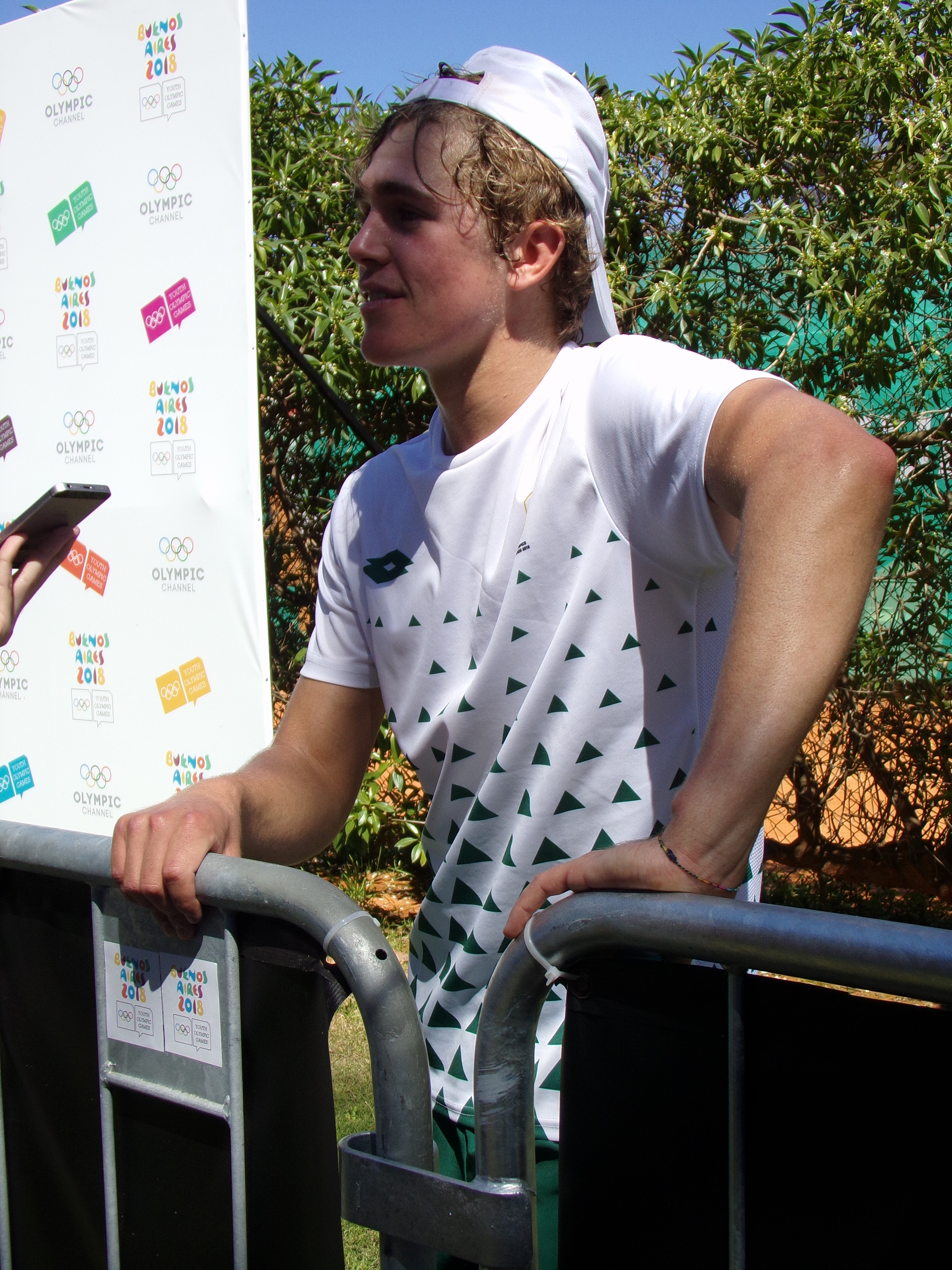
- Henning at the 2018 Summer Youth Olympics
- Full name: Philip Barry Henning
- Country (sports): South Africa
- Born: 10 November 2000 (age 26) Bloemfontein, South Africa
- Height: 1.83 m (6 ft 0 in)
- Plays: Right-handed (two-handed backhand)
- College: University of Georgia
- Coach: Stephan de Kock
- Prize money: US $129,674

Singles
- Career record: 7–6 (at ATP Tour level, Grand Slam level, and in Davis Cup)
- Career titles: 0
- Highest ranking: No. 233 (16 November 2026)
- Current ranking: No. 233 (16 November 2026)

Doubles
- Career record: 3–2 (at ATP Tour level, Grand Slam level, and in Davis Cup)
- Career titles: 0
- Highest ranking: No. 424 (19 October 2026)
- Current ranking: No. 431 (16 November 2026)
- Last updated on: 16 November 2026.

Philip Barry Henning (born 10 November 2000) is a South African tennis player. He has a career high ATP singles ranking of No. 233 achieved on 16 November 2026 and a doubles ranking of No. 424 achieved on 19 October 2026.

Henning represents South Africa at the Davis Cup, where he has a singles W/L record of 10/6.

== Career ==
=== Juniors ===
In May 2017, Henning won his first ITF junior singles title at the G4 in Windhoek, Namibia. Henning has won 6 ITF junior titles in 2017 and 3 in 2018. In October 2018, Henning represented South Africa at the Youth Olympic Games.

As a junior, Henning reached a career-high combined ranking of No. 35 in the ITF's world junior rankings.

As a junior, he compiled a singles win–loss record of 93–36.

Junior Grand Slam results - Singles:

Australian Open: 1R (2017), 3R (2018)
French Open: 1R (2018)
Wimbledon: 1R (2018)
US Open: 2R (2018)

Junior Grand Slam results - Doubles:

Australian Open: 1R (2017), QF (2018)
French Open: 1R (2018)
Wimbledon: 1R (2018)
US Open: 1R (2018)

=== Junior singles titles (9) ===
Legend (singles)
Grand Slam (0)
Grade A (0)
Grade B (1)
Grade 1–5 (8)

Outcome	No.	Date	Tournament	Surface	Opponent	Score
Winner	1.	6 May 2017	Windhoek, Namibia	Hard	(South Africa) Pierre Malan	6–3, 6–0
Winner	2.	13 May 2017	Windhoek, Namibia	Hard	(South Africa) Gerhardt Marius Becker	6–1, 6–0
Winner	3.	29 July 2017	Johannesburg, South Africa	Hard	(South Africa) Lleyton Cronje	6–2, 7–6
Winner	4.	5 August 2017	Pretoria, South Africa	Hard	(South Africa) Christiaan Worst	6–1, 6–3
Winner	5.	23 September 2017	Stellenbosch, South Africa	Hard	(Netherlands) Lodewijk Weststrate	6–3, 6–4
Winner	6.	30 September 2017	Stellenbosch, South Africa	Hard	(Netherlands) Lodewijk Weststrate	2-6, 6–2, 6–2
Winner	7.	3 March 2018	Pretoria, South Africa	Hard	(Hungary) Mate Voros	6–2, 6–3
Winner	8.	17 March 2018	Morocco	Clay	(Morocco) Yassir Kilani	6–1, 6–1
Winner	9.	28 July 2018	Pretoria, South Africa	Hard	(South Africa) Joubert Klopper	6–2, 3–6, 7–5

=== University ===
Philip enrolled at the University of Georgia in January 2019, joining the Bulldogs men's tennis team mid-season. He consistently ranked nationally in singles (peaking at Nr.8) and doubles throughout his college career, earning multiple All-SEC honors (First and Second Team) and was twice named SEC Player of the Week. In his final year, he earned ITA Southeast Regional Senior Player of the Year and reached the finals of the 2022 ITA All-American Championships in singles.

=== Senior ===
Philip mainly competes on the ITF Men's World Tennis Tour and the ATP Challenger Tour. His best result on the Challenger Tour was reaching the quarterfinal of the 2024 Jinan Open in Jinan, China in August 2024, where he lost to the first seed Yuta Shimizu. He also reached the quarterfinal stage of the 2025 Côte d'Ivoire Open in Abidjan, Ivory Coast in April 2025, where he lost to the first seed Aziz Dougaz.

Henning won his first ATP Challenger singles title at the 2026 Centurion Challenger II, defeating Alexander Donski in the final.

== ATP Challenger and ITF Tour finals ==
=== Singles: 21 (16–5) ===
Legend ATP Challenger (1-1) ITF World Tennis Tour (15–3)	Finals by surface Hard (15–2) Clay (1–2) Carpet (0–1)

Result	W–L	Date	Tournament	Tier	Surface	Opponent	Score
Win	1–0	Oct 2023	M15 Sharm El-Sheikh, Egypt	World Tennis Tour	Hard	(Ukraine) Vadym Ursu	6–3, 6–3
Loss	1–1	Oct 2023	M15 Sharm El-Sheikh, Egypt	World Tennis Tour	Hard	(Ukraine) Vadym Ursu	4–6, 7–6^{(7–3)}, 2–6
Win	2–1	Feb 2024	M15 Sharm El-Sheikh, Egypt	World Tennis Tour	Hard	(Netherlands) Mees Röttgering	6-3, 6–3
Win	3–1	Feb 2024	M15 Sharm El-Sheikh, Egypt	World Tennis Tour	Hard	(Egypt) Fares Zakaria	6-3, 6–3
Loss	3–2	Apr 2024	M15 Antalya, Turkiye	World Tennis Tour	Clay	(Italy) Facundo Juarez	2–6, 3–6
Win	4–2	May 2024	M25 Addis Ababa, Ethiopia	World Tennis Tour	Clay	(Egypt) Siddharth Vishwakarma	6-2, 6–2
Win	5–2	Jun 2024	M15 Hillcrest, South Africa	World Tennis Tour	Hard	(Namibia) Connor Henry Van Schalkwyk	6-4, 6–4
Win	6–2	Nov 2024	M15 Yanagawa City, Japan	World Tennis Tour	Hard	(Japan) Yuta Kikuchi	7–6^{(7–1)}, 6–1
Win	7–2	Dec 2024	M15 Stellenbosch, South Africa	World Tennis Tour	Hard	(Germany) Nino Ehrenschneider	6-4, 6–1
Win	8–2	Dec 2024	M15 Stellenbosch, South Africa	World Tennis Tour	Hard	(South Africa) Kris van Wyk	6-4, 6–4
Win	9–2	Jul 2025	M25 Hillcrest, South Africa	World Tennis Tour	Hard	(United States) Adhithya Ganesan	6-2, 5–7, 6–1
Win	10–2	Jul 2025	M15 Hillcrest, South Africa	World Tennis Tour	Hard	(Poland) Filip Peliwo	4-6, 6–4, 6–2
Win	11–2	Jul 2025	M15 Hillcrest, South Africa	World Tennis Tour	Hard	(South Africa) Marc Van Der Merwe	6-3, 6–3
Win	12–2	Nov 2025	M15 Heraklion, Greece	World Tennis Tour	Hard	(Romania) Gabriel Ghetu	6-2, 6–0
Win	13–2	Nov 2025	M25 Heraklion, Greece	World Tennis Tour	Hard	(Greece) Ioannis Xilas	6-4, 7–5
Win	14–2	Des 2025	M15 Sharm El-Sheikh, Egypt	World Tennis Tour	Hard	(Belgium) Pierre Yves Bailly	6-3, 6–3
Loss	14–3	Apr 2026	M25 Santa Margherita di Pula, Italy	World Tennis Tour	Clay	(Italy) Giuseppe La Vela	5–7, 6–4,6–7^{(6–8)}
Win	15–3	Jun 2026	Centurion Challenger II, South Africa	ATP Challenger Tour	Hard	(Bulgaria) Alexander Donski	6-2, 3-6, 7–6^{(8–6)}
Win	16–3	Aug 2026	M25 Idanha-a-Nova, Portugal	World Tennis Tour	Hard	(France) Dan Added	6–4, 6–3
Loss	16–4	Oct 2026	M25 Sarreguemines, France	World Tennis Tour	Carpet	(France) Arthur Nagel	6-4, 3–6, 3–6
Loss	16–5	Nov 2026	Crete Challenger, Greece	ATP Challenger Tour	Hard	(Italy) Michele Ribecai	6–4, 2–6, 0–6

=== Doubles: 8 (3-5) ===
Legend (doubles) ITF World Tennis Tour (2–1)	Titles by surface Hard (3–4) Clay (0–1)

Result	W–L	Date	Tournament	Tier	Surface	Partner	Opponents	Score
Loss	0–1	Nov 2021	M25 Austin, United States	World Tennis Tour	Hard	(South Africa) Joubert Klopper	(Portugal) Duarte Vale (United States) Alfredo Perez	6–7^{(1–7)}, 2–6
Win	1–1	Nov 2022	M25 Austin, United States	World Tennis Tour	Hard	(United States) Tyler Stewart	(France) Martin Breysach (Greece) Demetris Azoides	6–2, 6–4
Win	2–1	Oct 2023	M15 Sharm El-Sheikh, Egypt	World Tennis Tour	Hard	(South Africa) Dylan Salton	(Italy) Alexandr Binda; Ilia Simakin	4–6, 6–4, [10–8]
Loss	2–2	Feb 2024	M15 Sharm ElSheikh, Egypt	World Tennis Tour	Hard	(United Kingdom) Ben Jones	(Georgia (country)) Aleksandre Bakshi (Spain) David Perez Sanz	6-4, 2–6, [4-10]
Loss	2–3	Aug 2024	M25 Yinchuan, China	World Tennis Tour	Hard	(South Africa) Kris van Wyk	(New Zealand) Ajeet Rai (China) Aoran Wang	4–6, 4–6
Win	3–3	Feb 2025	M25 Roehampton, Great Britain	World Tennis Tour	Hard	(United Kingdom) Ben Jones	(United Kingdom) Tom Hands (United Kingdom) Harry Wendelken	6-4, 6–3
Loss	3–4	Jul 2025	M15 Hillcrest, South Africa	World Tennis Tour	Hard	(South Africa) Gerard Henning	(South Africa) Devin Badenhorst (South Africa) Luc Koenig	1–6, 4–6
Loss	3–5	Mar 2026	M25 Santa Margherita de Pula, Italy	World Tennis Tour	Clay	(Bulgaria) Yanaki Milev	(Turkey) Ergi Kirkin (Germany) Niels McDonald	1–6, 3–6
