= Arda Azkara =

Turkish tennis player (born 2003)

- Country (sports): Turkey
- Born: 14 March 2003 (age 23) İzmir, Turkey
- Height: 1.91 m (6 ft 3 in)
- Plays: Right-handed (two-handed backhand)
- College: New Mexico; Georgia
- Prize money: US $42,374

Singles
- Career record: 1–0 (at ATP Tour level, Grand Slam level, and in Davis Cup)
- Career titles: 2 ITF
- Highest ranking: No. 541 (17 November 2025)
- Current ranking: No. 801 (19 October 2026)

Doubles
- Career record: 1–1 (at ATP Tour level, Grand Slam level, and in Davis Cup)
- Career titles: 2 ATP Challenger, 2 ITF
- Highest ranking: No. 202 (19 October 2026)
- Current ranking: No. 202 (19 October 2026)
- Last updated on: 19 October 2026.

Arda Azkara (born 14 March 2003) is a Turkish tennis player. Azkara has a career high ATP singles ranking of No. 541 achieved on 17 November 2025 and a career high ATP doubles ranking of No. 202 achieved on 19 October 2026.

Azkara has won two ATP Challenger doubles titles, at the 2026 Centurion Challenger II with Tuncay Duran and the 2026 ENKA Open with James MacKinlay.

Azkara represents Turkey at the Davis Cup, where he has a win/loss record of 1–1.

Azkara played college tennis at New Mexico before transferring to Georgia.
